= List of minor planets: 321001–322000 =

The following is a partial list of minor planets, running from minor-planet number 321001 through 322000, inclusive. The primary data for this and other partial lists is based on JPL's "Small-Body Orbital Elements" and data available from the Minor Planet Center. Critical list information is also provided by the MPC, unless otherwise specified from Lowell Observatory. A detailed description of the table's columns and additional sources are given on the main page including a complete list of every page in this series, and a statistical break-up on the dynamical classification of minor planets.

Also see the summary list of all named bodies in numerical and alphabetical order, and the corresponding naming citations for the number range of this particular list. New namings may only be added to this list after official publication, as the preannouncement of names is condemned by the Working Group for Small Bodies Nomenclature of the International Astronomical Union.

| Near-Earth obj. | MBA (inner) | MBA (outer) | Centaur |
| Mars-crosser | MBA (middle) | Jupiter trojan | Trans-Neptunian obj. |
| Unclassified |

== 321001–321100 ==
| Designation | | | Discovery | | | Properties | | Ref |
| Permanent | Provisional | Named after | Date | Site | Discoverer(s) | Category | Diam. | Ref |
|---|---|---|---|---|---|---|---|---|
| 321001 | 2008 KQ_{13} | — | May 27, 2008 | Kitt Peak | Spacewatch | · | 2.9 km | MPC · JPL |
| 321002 | 2008 KU_{14} | — | May 27, 2008 | Kitt Peak | Spacewatch | · | 2.0 km | MPC · JPL |
| 321003 | 2008 KG_{17} | — | May 27, 2008 | Kitt Peak | Spacewatch | · | 3.0 km | MPC · JPL |
| 321004 | 2008 KR_{23} | — | May 28, 2008 | Kitt Peak | Spacewatch | HYG | 3.3 km | MPC · JPL |
| 321005 | 2008 KQ_{24} | — | May 28, 2008 | Kitt Peak | Spacewatch | · | 4.0 km | MPC · JPL |
| 321006 | 2008 KO_{26} | — | May 29, 2008 | Kitt Peak | Spacewatch | EOS | 1.9 km | MPC · JPL |
| 321007 | 2008 KR_{26} | — | May 29, 2008 | Kitt Peak | Spacewatch | · | 1.7 km | MPC · JPL |
| 321008 | 2008 KE_{27} | — | May 30, 2008 | Kitt Peak | Spacewatch | · | 1.8 km | MPC · JPL |
| 321009 | 2008 KX_{29} | — | May 29, 2008 | Kitt Peak | Spacewatch | · | 4.0 km | MPC · JPL |
| 321010 | 2008 KF_{33} | — | May 29, 2008 | Mount Lemmon | Mount Lemmon Survey | EOS | 1.8 km | MPC · JPL |
| 321011 | 2008 KX_{33} | — | May 29, 2008 | Kitt Peak | Spacewatch | · | 2.5 km | MPC · JPL |
| 321012 | 2008 KC_{40} | — | May 31, 2008 | Kitt Peak | Spacewatch | · | 2.1 km | MPC · JPL |
| 321013 | 2008 KZ_{40} | — | May 30, 2008 | Kitt Peak | Spacewatch | · | 2.1 km | MPC · JPL |
| 321014 | 2008 LB_{1} | — | June 1, 2008 | Mount Lemmon | Mount Lemmon Survey | · | 1.7 km | MPC · JPL |
| 321015 | 2008 LZ_{2} | — | June 1, 2008 | Kitt Peak | Spacewatch | · | 3.2 km | MPC · JPL |
| 321016 | 2008 LQ_{3} | — | June 2, 2008 | Kitt Peak | Spacewatch | · | 2.9 km | MPC · JPL |
| 321017 | 2008 LX_{11} | — | June 7, 2008 | Kitt Peak | Spacewatch | · | 2.1 km | MPC · JPL |
| 321018 | 2008 LX_{12} | — | June 5, 2008 | Mount Lemmon | Mount Lemmon Survey | GEF | 1.2 km | MPC · JPL |
| 321019 | 2008 LC_{15} | — | June 8, 2008 | Kitt Peak | Spacewatch | · | 2.8 km | MPC · JPL |
| 321020 | 2008 LY_{15} | — | June 10, 2008 | Kitt Peak | Spacewatch | · | 2.2 km | MPC · JPL |
| 321021 | 2008 LD_{16} | — | June 10, 2008 | Kitt Peak | Spacewatch | · | 1.8 km | MPC · JPL |
| 321022 | 2008 LA_{18} | — | June 15, 2008 | Siding Spring | SSS | · | 2.3 km | MPC · JPL |
| 321023 | 2008 MA | — | June 22, 2008 | Kitt Peak | Spacewatch | · | 3.6 km | MPC · JPL |
| 321024 Gijon | 2008 MD_{1} | Gijon | June 28, 2008 | La Cañada | Lacruz, J. | · | 2.9 km | MPC · JPL |
| 321025 | 2008 ME_{1} | — | June 28, 2008 | Siding Spring | SSS | · | 3.1 km | MPC · JPL |
| 321026 | 2008 MD_{2} | — | June 24, 2008 | Kitt Peak | Spacewatch | · | 2.2 km | MPC · JPL |
| 321027 | 2008 NR_{1} | — | July 6, 2008 | Pla D'Arguines | R. Ferrando | · | 5.8 km | MPC · JPL |
| 321028 | 2008 OV_{5} | — | July 28, 2008 | Dauban | Kugel, F. | · | 4.3 km | MPC · JPL |
| 321029 | 2008 OK_{17} | — | July 29, 2008 | Mount Lemmon | Mount Lemmon Survey | · | 1.5 km | MPC · JPL |
| 321030 | 2008 OC_{22} | — | July 30, 2008 | Kitt Peak | Spacewatch | HYG | 3.8 km | MPC · JPL |
| 321031 | 2008 OC_{23} | — | July 30, 2008 | Mount Lemmon | Mount Lemmon Survey | · | 1.7 km | MPC · JPL |
| 321032 | 2008 PL_{4} | — | August 5, 2008 | Hibiscus | S. F. Hönig, Teamo, N. | EOS | 2.5 km | MPC · JPL |
| 321033 | 2008 PL_{7} | — | August 5, 2008 | La Sagra | OAM | · | 2.7 km | MPC · JPL |
| 321034 | 2008 PH_{8} | — | August 6, 2008 | La Sagra | OAM | · | 3.1 km | MPC · JPL |
| 321035 | 2008 PZ_{16} | — | August 7, 2008 | Reedy Creek | J. Broughton | · | 3.7 km | MPC · JPL |
| 321036 | 2008 PT_{21} | — | August 12, 2008 | Socorro | LINEAR | · | 2.6 km | MPC · JPL |
| 321037 | 2008 QK_{3} | — | August 25, 2008 | Sandlot | G. Hug | VER | 2.9 km | MPC · JPL |
| 321038 | 2008 QY_{4} | — | August 22, 2008 | Kitt Peak | Spacewatch | EMA | 3.0 km | MPC · JPL |
| 321039 | 2008 QB_{10} | — | August 26, 2008 | Dauban | Kugel, F. | · | 3.1 km | MPC · JPL |
| 321040 | 2008 QW_{21} | — | August 26, 2008 | Socorro | LINEAR | · | 6.5 km | MPC · JPL |
| 321041 | 2008 QB_{24} | — | December 7, 2001 | Kitt Peak | Spacewatch | · | 1.3 km | MPC · JPL |
| 321042 | 2008 QY_{27} | — | August 30, 2008 | La Sagra | OAM | · | 3.4 km | MPC · JPL |
| 321043 | 2008 QF_{28} | — | August 30, 2008 | La Sagra | OAM | · | 6.0 km | MPC · JPL |
| 321044 | 2008 QB_{29} | — | August 30, 2008 | Socorro | LINEAR | · | 1.8 km | MPC · JPL |
| 321045 Kretinga | 2008 QY_{32} | Kretinga | August 31, 2008 | Moletai | K. Černis, E. Cernis | · | 1.4 km | MPC · JPL |
| 321046 Klushantsev | 2008 QL_{33} | Klushantsev | August 29, 2008 | Zelenchukskaya Stn | T. V. Krjačko | · | 3.3 km | MPC · JPL |
| 321047 | 2008 QR_{33} | — | August 26, 2008 | La Sagra | OAM | · | 2.2 km | MPC · JPL |
| 321048 | 2008 RS_{16} | — | September 4, 2008 | Kitt Peak | Spacewatch | · | 3.3 km | MPC · JPL |
| 321049 | 2008 RN_{23} | — | September 4, 2008 | Socorro | LINEAR | H | 650 m | MPC · JPL |
| 321050 | 2008 RY_{27} | — | September 1, 2008 | La Sagra | OAM | EOS | 2.5 km | MPC · JPL |
| 321051 | 2008 RM_{63} | — | September 4, 2008 | Kitt Peak | Spacewatch | · | 3.2 km | MPC · JPL |
| 321052 | 2008 RK_{64} | — | September 4, 2008 | Kitt Peak | Spacewatch | · | 1.2 km | MPC · JPL |
| 321053 | 2008 RO_{73} | — | October 28, 2005 | Mount Lemmon | Mount Lemmon Survey | NYS | 1.1 km | MPC · JPL |
| 321054 | 2008 RP_{96} | — | September 7, 2008 | Mount Lemmon | Mount Lemmon Survey | KOR | 1.6 km | MPC · JPL |
| 321055 | 2008 RH_{111} | — | September 4, 2008 | Kitt Peak | Spacewatch | · | 2.8 km | MPC · JPL |
| 321056 | 2008 RX_{116} | — | September 7, 2008 | Mount Lemmon | Mount Lemmon Survey | · | 1.9 km | MPC · JPL |
| 321057 | 2008 RL_{121} | — | September 2, 2008 | Kitt Peak | Spacewatch | · | 1.7 km | MPC · JPL |
| 321058 | 2008 RC_{133} | — | September 6, 2008 | Catalina | CSS | · | 740 m | MPC · JPL |
| 321059 | 2008 RE_{134} | — | September 6, 2008 | Catalina | CSS | RAF | 1.2 km | MPC · JPL |
| 321060 | 2008 RH_{138} | — | September 6, 2008 | Mount Lemmon | Mount Lemmon Survey | AGN | 1.4 km | MPC · JPL |
| 321061 | 2008 RS_{139} | — | September 7, 2008 | Catalina | CSS | MAS | 1.1 km | MPC · JPL |
| 321062 | 2008 SH_{19} | — | September 19, 2008 | Kitt Peak | Spacewatch | · | 3.7 km | MPC · JPL |
| 321063 | 2008 SK_{25} | — | September 12, 1998 | Kitt Peak | Spacewatch | · | 2.1 km | MPC · JPL |
| 321064 | 2008 SW_{40} | — | September 20, 2008 | Catalina | CSS | · | 2.6 km | MPC · JPL |
| 321065 | 2008 SS_{49} | — | August 24, 2008 | Kitt Peak | Spacewatch | URS | 2.9 km | MPC · JPL |
| 321066 | 2008 SF_{56} | — | September 20, 2008 | Kitt Peak | Spacewatch | · | 3.0 km | MPC · JPL |
| 321067 | 2008 SJ_{56} | — | September 20, 2008 | Mount Lemmon | Mount Lemmon Survey | L4 | 10 km | MPC · JPL |
| 321068 | 2008 SZ_{56} | — | September 20, 2008 | Kitt Peak | Spacewatch | slow | 2.6 km | MPC · JPL |
| 321069 | 2008 SB_{57} | — | September 20, 2008 | Kitt Peak | Spacewatch | · | 890 m | MPC · JPL |
| 321070 | 2008 SM_{58} | — | September 20, 2008 | Kitt Peak | Spacewatch | L4 | 9.1 km | MPC · JPL |
| 321071 | 2008 SN_{61} | — | September 21, 2008 | Kitt Peak | Spacewatch | · | 970 m | MPC · JPL |
| 321072 | 2008 SX_{63} | — | September 21, 2008 | Kitt Peak | Spacewatch | H | 620 m | MPC · JPL |
| 321073 | 2008 SR_{65} | — | September 21, 2008 | Mount Lemmon | Mount Lemmon Survey | · | 1.3 km | MPC · JPL |
| 321074 | 2008 SP_{67} | — | September 21, 2008 | Kitt Peak | Spacewatch | L4 | 13 km | MPC · JPL |
| 321075 | 2008 SJ_{72} | — | September 22, 2008 | Kitt Peak | Spacewatch | · | 840 m | MPC · JPL |
| 321076 | 2008 SB_{75} | — | September 23, 2008 | Mount Lemmon | Mount Lemmon Survey | · | 2.4 km | MPC · JPL |
| 321077 | 2008 SJ_{84} | — | September 27, 2008 | Sierra Stars | Tozzi, F. | · | 2.5 km | MPC · JPL |
| 321078 | 2008 SY_{91} | — | September 21, 2008 | Kitt Peak | Spacewatch | L4 | 11 km | MPC · JPL |
| 321079 | 2008 SW_{97} | — | September 21, 2008 | Kitt Peak | Spacewatch | · | 3.5 km | MPC · JPL |
| 321080 | 2008 SZ_{100} | — | September 21, 2008 | Kitt Peak | Spacewatch | · | 3.3 km | MPC · JPL |
| 321081 | 2008 SN_{105} | — | September 21, 2008 | Kitt Peak | Spacewatch | MRX | 1.4 km | MPC · JPL |
| 321082 | 2008 SM_{121} | — | September 22, 2008 | Mount Lemmon | Mount Lemmon Survey | L4 | 8.7 km | MPC · JPL |
| 321083 | 2008 SB_{133} | — | September 22, 2008 | Kitt Peak | Spacewatch | KOR | 1.6 km | MPC · JPL |
| 321084 | 2008 SE_{147} | — | September 24, 2008 | Goodricke-Pigott | R. A. Tucker | · | 3.1 km | MPC · JPL |
| 321085 | 2008 SV_{149} | — | September 29, 2008 | Dauban | Kugel, F. | · | 1.8 km | MPC · JPL |
| 321086 | 2008 SX_{165} | — | September 28, 2008 | Socorro | LINEAR | L4 | 9.6 km | MPC · JPL |
| 321087 | 2008 SL_{174} | — | September 22, 2008 | Catalina | CSS | · | 4.1 km | MPC · JPL |
| 321088 | 2008 SX_{195} | — | September 25, 2008 | Kitt Peak | Spacewatch | · | 1.3 km | MPC · JPL |
| 321089 | 2008 SF_{198} | — | September 25, 2008 | Kitt Peak | Spacewatch | · | 2.0 km | MPC · JPL |
| 321090 | 2008 SW_{208} | — | September 27, 2008 | Mount Lemmon | Mount Lemmon Survey | THM | 3.0 km | MPC · JPL |
| 321091 | 2008 SX_{224} | — | September 26, 2008 | Kitt Peak | Spacewatch | L4 | 8.3 km | MPC · JPL |
| 321092 | 2008 SB_{256} | — | September 20, 2008 | Kitt Peak | Spacewatch | · | 3.6 km | MPC · JPL |
| 321093 | 2008 SH_{261} | — | September 23, 2008 | Kitt Peak | Spacewatch | THM | 2.8 km | MPC · JPL |
| 321094 | 2008 SK_{266} | — | September 25, 2008 | Kitt Peak | Spacewatch | · | 2.0 km | MPC · JPL |
| 321095 | 2008 SA_{277} | — | September 3, 2008 | Kitt Peak | Spacewatch | L4 · ERY | 8.3 km | MPC · JPL |
| 321096 | 2008 ST_{279} | — | September 24, 2008 | Kitt Peak | Spacewatch | · | 710 m | MPC · JPL |
| 321097 | 2008 SP_{284} | — | September 24, 2008 | Kitt Peak | Spacewatch | NEM | 2.6 km | MPC · JPL |
| 321098 | 2008 SZ_{303} | — | September 24, 2008 | Catalina | CSS | MAR | 1.8 km | MPC · JPL |
| 321099 | 2008 SP_{305} | — | September 27, 2008 | Mount Lemmon | Mount Lemmon Survey | HYG | 3.6 km | MPC · JPL |
| 321100 | 2008 TV_{46} | — | October 1, 2008 | Kitt Peak | Spacewatch | · | 2.7 km | MPC · JPL |

== 321101–321200 ==
back to top

| Designation | | | Discovery | | | Properties | | Ref |
| Permanent | Provisional | Named after | Date | Site | Discoverer(s) | Category | Diam. | Ref |
|---|---|---|---|---|---|---|---|---|
| 321101 | 2008 TB_{49} | — | October 2, 2008 | Kitt Peak | Spacewatch | · | 2.4 km | MPC · JPL |
| 321102 | 2008 TA_{53} | — | October 2, 2008 | Kitt Peak | Spacewatch | · | 2.9 km | MPC · JPL |
| 321103 | 2008 TL_{57} | — | October 2, 2008 | Kitt Peak | Spacewatch | L4 | 6.7 km | MPC · JPL |
| 321104 | 2008 TT_{59} | — | October 2, 2008 | Kitt Peak | Spacewatch | · | 2.2 km | MPC · JPL |
| 321105 | 2008 TP_{63} | — | October 2, 2008 | Kitt Peak | Spacewatch | · | 820 m | MPC · JPL |
| 321106 | 2008 TD_{66} | — | October 2, 2008 | Kitt Peak | Spacewatch | (11882) | 1.9 km | MPC · JPL |
| 321107 | 2008 TL_{72} | — | November 26, 2003 | Kitt Peak | Spacewatch | HYG | 2.5 km | MPC · JPL |
| 321108 | 2008 TZ_{74} | — | October 2, 2008 | Kitt Peak | Spacewatch | · | 1.5 km | MPC · JPL |
| 321109 | 2008 TN_{87} | — | October 3, 2008 | Kitt Peak | Spacewatch | · | 1.8 km | MPC · JPL |
| 321110 | 2008 TF_{94} | — | October 5, 2008 | La Sagra | OAM | fast | 1.4 km | MPC · JPL |
| 321111 | 2008 TK_{108} | — | October 6, 2008 | Mount Lemmon | Mount Lemmon Survey | · | 1.9 km | MPC · JPL |
| 321112 | 2008 TV_{124} | — | October 8, 2008 | Mount Lemmon | Mount Lemmon Survey | L4 | 13 km | MPC · JPL |
| 321113 | 2008 TQ_{131} | — | October 8, 2008 | Mount Lemmon | Mount Lemmon Survey | L4 · ERY | 11 km | MPC · JPL |
| 321114 | 2008 TG_{133} | — | October 8, 2008 | Mount Lemmon | Mount Lemmon Survey | · | 1.8 km | MPC · JPL |
| 321115 | 2008 TB_{142} | — | October 9, 2008 | Mount Lemmon | Mount Lemmon Survey | L4 · (222861) | 11 km | MPC · JPL |
| 321116 | 2008 TS_{157} | — | October 4, 2008 | Catalina | CSS | H | 550 m | MPC · JPL |
| 321117 | 2008 TA_{165} | — | October 2, 2008 | Kitt Peak | Spacewatch | · | 3.3 km | MPC · JPL |
| 321118 | 2008 TW_{173} | — | October 1, 2008 | Mount Lemmon | Mount Lemmon Survey | · | 2.1 km | MPC · JPL |
| 321119 | 2008 TQ_{176} | — | October 9, 2008 | Catalina | CSS | EUN | 1.7 km | MPC · JPL |
| 321120 | 2008 UL_{11} | — | April 1, 2003 | Kitt Peak | Deep Ecliptic Survey | L4 | 8.9 km | MPC · JPL |
| 321121 | 2008 UY_{11} | — | October 17, 2008 | Kitt Peak | Spacewatch | · | 1.7 km | MPC · JPL |
| 321122 | 2008 UB_{14} | — | October 17, 2008 | Kitt Peak | Spacewatch | · | 4.0 km | MPC · JPL |
| 321123 | 2008 UU_{50} | — | October 20, 2008 | Mount Lemmon | Mount Lemmon Survey | · | 2.5 km | MPC · JPL |
| 321124 | 2008 UA_{52} | — | October 20, 2008 | Mount Lemmon | Mount Lemmon Survey | KOR | 1.4 km | MPC · JPL |
| 321125 | 2008 UE_{57} | — | October 21, 2008 | Kitt Peak | Spacewatch | KOR | 1.5 km | MPC · JPL |
| 321126 | 2008 UT_{60} | — | October 21, 2008 | Kitt Peak | Spacewatch | · | 1.6 km | MPC · JPL |
| 321127 | 2008 UJ_{78} | — | October 21, 2008 | Lulin | LUSS | · | 2.6 km | MPC · JPL |
| 321128 | 2008 UN_{79} | — | October 22, 2008 | Kitt Peak | Spacewatch | · | 2.1 km | MPC · JPL |
| 321129 | 2008 UC_{82} | — | October 22, 2008 | Kitt Peak | Spacewatch | · | 1.5 km | MPC · JPL |
| 321130 | 2008 UT_{86} | — | October 23, 2008 | Mount Lemmon | Mount Lemmon Survey | · | 880 m | MPC · JPL |
| 321131 Alishan | 2008 UO_{87} | Alishan | October 23, 2008 | Lulin | X. Y. Hsiao, Q. Ye | · | 2.1 km | MPC · JPL |
| 321132 | 2008 UL_{125} | — | October 22, 2008 | Kitt Peak | Spacewatch | H | 850 m | MPC · JPL |
| 321133 | 2008 UP_{138} | — | October 23, 2008 | Kitt Peak | Spacewatch | · | 2.0 km | MPC · JPL |
| 321134 | 2008 UZ_{138} | — | October 23, 2008 | Kitt Peak | Spacewatch | · | 1.6 km | MPC · JPL |
| 321135 | 2008 UV_{141} | — | October 23, 2008 | Kitt Peak | Spacewatch | · | 1.4 km | MPC · JPL |
| 321136 | 2008 UW_{147} | — | November 19, 2003 | Kitt Peak | Spacewatch | KOR | 1.7 km | MPC · JPL |
| 321137 | 2008 UY_{147} | — | October 23, 2008 | Kitt Peak | Spacewatch | KOR | 1.5 km | MPC · JPL |
| 321138 | 2008 UY_{152} | — | October 23, 2008 | Mount Lemmon | Mount Lemmon Survey | L4 | 10 km | MPC · JPL |
| 321139 | 2008 UQ_{157} | — | October 23, 2008 | Mount Lemmon | Mount Lemmon Survey | · | 2.0 km | MPC · JPL |
| 321140 | 2008 UT_{163} | — | October 24, 2008 | Kitt Peak | Spacewatch | · | 2.0 km | MPC · JPL |
| 321141 | 2008 UD_{176} | — | October 24, 2008 | Mount Lemmon | Mount Lemmon Survey | · | 2.2 km | MPC · JPL |
| 321142 | 2008 UV_{186} | — | October 24, 2008 | Kitt Peak | Spacewatch | · | 1.7 km | MPC · JPL |
| 321143 | 2008 UN_{197} | — | October 27, 2008 | Mount Lemmon | Mount Lemmon Survey | · | 1.9 km | MPC · JPL |
| 321144 | 2008 UE_{223} | — | October 25, 2008 | Kitt Peak | Spacewatch | · | 1.7 km | MPC · JPL |
| 321145 | 2008 UB_{226} | — | October 25, 2008 | Catalina | CSS | · | 1.8 km | MPC · JPL |
| 321146 | 2008 UZ_{255} | — | October 27, 2008 | Kitt Peak | Spacewatch | KOR | 1.5 km | MPC · JPL |
| 321147 | 2008 UW_{259} | — | October 27, 2008 | Kitt Peak | Spacewatch | KOR | 1.6 km | MPC · JPL |
| 321148 | 2008 UZ_{286} | — | October 28, 2008 | Mount Lemmon | Mount Lemmon Survey | CYB | 4.1 km | MPC · JPL |
| 321149 | 2008 UL_{294} | — | October 29, 2008 | Kitt Peak | Spacewatch | · | 2.1 km | MPC · JPL |
| 321150 | 2008 UW_{301} | — | September 29, 2008 | Mount Lemmon | Mount Lemmon Survey | L4 | 7.9 km | MPC · JPL |
| 321151 | 2008 UD_{303} | — | October 29, 2008 | Kitt Peak | Spacewatch | NYS | 1.3 km | MPC · JPL |
| 321152 | 2008 UX_{307} | — | October 30, 2008 | Catalina | CSS | · | 2.9 km | MPC · JPL |
| 321153 | 2008 UJ_{314} | — | October 30, 2008 | Kitt Peak | Spacewatch | · | 1.9 km | MPC · JPL |
| 321154 | 2008 UO_{315} | — | October 30, 2008 | Mount Lemmon | Mount Lemmon Survey | · | 1.1 km | MPC · JPL |
| 321155 | 2008 US_{330} | — | October 31, 2008 | Kitt Peak | Spacewatch | · | 2.1 km | MPC · JPL |
| 321156 | 2008 UX_{331} | — | October 31, 2008 | Mount Lemmon | Mount Lemmon Survey | · | 1.6 km | MPC · JPL |
| 321157 | 2008 UA_{341} | — | October 25, 2008 | Kitt Peak | Spacewatch | · | 2.4 km | MPC · JPL |
| 321158 | 2008 UJ_{345} | — | October 31, 2008 | Kitt Peak | Spacewatch | · | 2.1 km | MPC · JPL |
| 321159 | 2008 UK_{346} | — | October 25, 2008 | Catalina | CSS | · | 2.0 km | MPC · JPL |
| 321160 | 2008 UO_{353} | — | October 31, 2008 | Kitt Peak | Spacewatch | · | 890 m | MPC · JPL |
| 321161 | 2008 UV_{353} | — | October 20, 2008 | Kitt Peak | Spacewatch | · | 2.2 km | MPC · JPL |
| 321162 | 2008 UE_{354} | — | October 23, 2008 | Mount Lemmon | Mount Lemmon Survey | NYS | 1.5 km | MPC · JPL |
| 321163 | 2008 VH_{4} | — | November 4, 2008 | Bisei SG Center | BATTeRS | · | 3.4 km | MPC · JPL |
| 321164 | 2008 VU_{19} | — | November 1, 2008 | Mount Lemmon | Mount Lemmon Survey | KOR | 1.6 km | MPC · JPL |
| 321165 | 2008 VW_{19} | — | November 1, 2008 | Mount Lemmon | Mount Lemmon Survey | AGN | 1.3 km | MPC · JPL |
| 321166 | 2008 VG_{29} | — | November 2, 2008 | Kitt Peak | Spacewatch | · | 2.1 km | MPC · JPL |
| 321167 | 2008 VQ_{37} | — | November 2, 2008 | Mount Lemmon | Mount Lemmon Survey | · | 4.1 km | MPC · JPL |
| 321168 | 2008 VQ_{41} | — | November 3, 2008 | Catalina | CSS | · | 4.0 km | MPC · JPL |
| 321169 | 2008 VC_{47} | — | November 3, 2008 | Kitt Peak | Spacewatch | AGN | 1.2 km | MPC · JPL |
| 321170 | 2008 VL_{68} | — | November 8, 2008 | Mount Lemmon | Mount Lemmon Survey | · | 2.1 km | MPC · JPL |
| 321171 | 2008 VN_{72} | — | November 7, 2008 | Mount Lemmon | Mount Lemmon Survey | · | 1.6 km | MPC · JPL |
| 321172 | 2008 VD_{74} | — | November 7, 2008 | Mount Lemmon | Mount Lemmon Survey | KOR | 1.4 km | MPC · JPL |
| 321173 | 2008 VU_{75} | — | November 6, 2008 | Catalina | CSS | · | 2.8 km | MPC · JPL |
| 321174 | 2008 WT_{7} | — | November 17, 2008 | Kitt Peak | Spacewatch | · | 1.2 km | MPC · JPL |
| 321175 | 2008 WF_{8} | — | November 17, 2008 | Kitt Peak | Spacewatch | THM | 3.0 km | MPC · JPL |
| 321176 | 2008 WB_{17} | — | November 17, 2008 | Kitt Peak | Spacewatch | KOR | 1.3 km | MPC · JPL |
| 321177 | 2008 WY_{29} | — | November 19, 2008 | Mount Lemmon | Mount Lemmon Survey | · | 1.8 km | MPC · JPL |
| 321178 | 2008 WR_{34} | — | November 17, 2008 | Kitt Peak | Spacewatch | · | 5.0 km | MPC · JPL |
| 321179 | 2008 WE_{45} | — | November 17, 2008 | Kitt Peak | Spacewatch | KOR | 1.4 km | MPC · JPL |
| 321180 | 2008 WD_{49} | — | October 18, 2003 | Kitt Peak | Spacewatch | · | 3.1 km | MPC · JPL |
| 321181 | 2008 WW_{68} | — | November 18, 2008 | Kitt Peak | Spacewatch | · | 1.4 km | MPC · JPL |
| 321182 | 2008 WX_{70} | — | November 18, 2008 | Kitt Peak | Spacewatch | · | 1.6 km | MPC · JPL |
| 321183 | 2008 WL_{112} | — | November 30, 2008 | Kitt Peak | Spacewatch | · | 1.2 km | MPC · JPL |
| 321184 | 2008 WM_{114} | — | November 30, 2008 | Mount Lemmon | Mount Lemmon Survey | · | 2.2 km | MPC · JPL |
| 321185 | 2008 WC_{130} | — | November 19, 2008 | Kitt Peak | Spacewatch | · | 2.7 km | MPC · JPL |
| 321186 | 2008 WL_{133} | — | October 16, 2002 | Palomar | NEAT | · | 3.8 km | MPC · JPL |
| 321187 | 2008 WM_{137} | — | November 22, 2008 | Socorro | LINEAR | URS | 5.7 km | MPC · JPL |
| 321188 | 2008 WE_{138} | — | November 30, 2008 | Socorro | LINEAR | · | 1.4 km | MPC · JPL |
| 321189 | 2008 WE_{139} | — | November 30, 2008 | Socorro | LINEAR | · | 1.5 km | MPC · JPL |
| 321190 | 2008 XF_{16} | — | December 1, 2008 | Kitt Peak | Spacewatch | · | 2.3 km | MPC · JPL |
| 321191 | 2008 XG_{18} | — | December 1, 2008 | Kitt Peak | Spacewatch | · | 1.7 km | MPC · JPL |
| 321192 | 2008 XY_{48} | — | December 4, 2008 | Mount Lemmon | Mount Lemmon Survey | (194) | 2.0 km | MPC · JPL |
| 321193 | 2008 XC_{52} | — | December 4, 2008 | Mount Lemmon | Mount Lemmon Survey | · | 2.0 km | MPC · JPL |
| 321194 | 2008 XH_{52} | — | December 5, 2008 | Kitt Peak | Spacewatch | · | 1.6 km | MPC · JPL |
| 321195 | 2008 YJ_{5} | — | December 21, 2008 | Piszkéstető | K. Sárneczky | MAS | 850 m | MPC · JPL |
| 321196 | 2008 YD_{8} | — | December 23, 2008 | La Sagra | OAM | H | 800 m | MPC · JPL |
| 321197 Qingdao | 2008 YK_{8} | Qingdao | December 23, 2008 | Weihai | University, Shandong | · | 2.9 km | MPC · JPL |
| 321198 | 2008 YD_{11} | — | December 20, 2008 | Mount Lemmon | Mount Lemmon Survey | H | 810 m | MPC · JPL |
| 321199 | 2008 YT_{18} | — | December 21, 2008 | Kitt Peak | Spacewatch | · | 1.9 km | MPC · JPL |
| 321200 | 2008 YR_{19} | — | December 21, 2008 | Mount Lemmon | Mount Lemmon Survey | (5) | 1.6 km | MPC · JPL |

== 321201–321300 ==
back to top

| Designation | | | Discovery | | | Properties | | Ref |
| Permanent | Provisional | Named after | Date | Site | Discoverer(s) | Category | Diam. | Ref |
|---|---|---|---|---|---|---|---|---|
| 321201 | 2008 YK_{20} | — | December 21, 2008 | Mount Lemmon | Mount Lemmon Survey | · | 1.5 km | MPC · JPL |
| 321202 | 2008 YH_{23} | — | December 20, 2008 | La Sagra | OAM | EOS | 3.6 km | MPC · JPL |
| 321203 | 2008 YA_{25} | — | December 28, 2008 | Mayhill | Lowe, A. | · | 1.8 km | MPC · JPL |
| 321204 | 2008 YS_{35} | — | December 22, 2008 | Kitt Peak | Spacewatch | · | 2.5 km | MPC · JPL |
| 321205 | 2008 YE_{37} | — | December 22, 2008 | Kitt Peak | Spacewatch | MAS | 940 m | MPC · JPL |
| 321206 | 2008 YK_{40} | — | December 29, 2008 | Kitt Peak | Spacewatch | · | 1.4 km | MPC · JPL |
| 321207 | 2008 YZ_{40} | — | December 30, 2008 | Mount Lemmon | Mount Lemmon Survey | · | 5.3 km | MPC · JPL |
| 321208 | 2008 YG_{41} | — | December 30, 2008 | Kitt Peak | Spacewatch | · | 1.6 km | MPC · JPL |
| 321209 | 2008 YS_{48} | — | December 29, 2008 | Mount Lemmon | Mount Lemmon Survey | EUN | 1.7 km | MPC · JPL |
| 321210 | 2008 YK_{50} | — | December 29, 2008 | Mount Lemmon | Mount Lemmon Survey | · | 1.7 km | MPC · JPL |
| 321211 | 2008 YC_{56} | — | December 30, 2008 | Kitt Peak | Spacewatch | · | 1.6 km | MPC · JPL |
| 321212 | 2008 YV_{57} | — | December 30, 2008 | Kitt Peak | Spacewatch | · | 3.6 km | MPC · JPL |
| 321213 | 2008 YM_{88} | — | December 29, 2008 | Kitt Peak | Spacewatch | · | 2.0 km | MPC · JPL |
| 321214 | 2008 YA_{95} | — | December 29, 2008 | Kitt Peak | Spacewatch | CYB | 4.0 km | MPC · JPL |
| 321215 | 2008 YD_{97} | — | December 29, 2008 | Mount Lemmon | Mount Lemmon Survey | · | 1.5 km | MPC · JPL |
| 321216 | 2008 YE_{109} | — | December 29, 2008 | Kitt Peak | Spacewatch | · | 4.3 km | MPC · JPL |
| 321217 | 2008 YK_{114} | — | December 29, 2008 | Kitt Peak | Spacewatch | · | 2.2 km | MPC · JPL |
| 321218 | 2008 YV_{123} | — | December 30, 2008 | Kitt Peak | Spacewatch | · | 1.6 km | MPC · JPL |
| 321219 | 2008 YQ_{136} | — | December 30, 2008 | Kitt Peak | Spacewatch | · | 4.1 km | MPC · JPL |
| 321220 | 2008 YW_{136} | — | December 30, 2008 | Kitt Peak | Spacewatch | · | 2.3 km | MPC · JPL |
| 321221 | 2008 YM_{142} | — | December 30, 2008 | Kitt Peak | Spacewatch | THM | 2.2 km | MPC · JPL |
| 321222 | 2008 YF_{147} | — | December 31, 2008 | Kitt Peak | Spacewatch | · | 3.8 km | MPC · JPL |
| 321223 | 2008 YF_{153} | — | December 21, 2008 | Kitt Peak | Spacewatch | KOR | 2.0 km | MPC · JPL |
| 321224 | 2008 YW_{155} | — | December 22, 2008 | Kitt Peak | Spacewatch | · | 1.4 km | MPC · JPL |
| 321225 | 2008 YN_{167} | — | December 21, 2008 | Mount Lemmon | Mount Lemmon Survey | EOS | 2.8 km | MPC · JPL |
| 321226 | 2009 AT_{9} | — | January 2, 2009 | Mount Lemmon | Mount Lemmon Survey | (17392) | 1.6 km | MPC · JPL |
| 321227 | 2009 AY_{16} | — | January 1, 2009 | Mount Lemmon | Mount Lemmon Survey | · | 2.0 km | MPC · JPL |
| 321228 | 2009 AW_{25} | — | January 2, 2009 | Kitt Peak | Spacewatch | · | 2.4 km | MPC · JPL |
| 321229 | 2009 AE_{41} | — | January 15, 2009 | Kitt Peak | Spacewatch | · | 890 m | MPC · JPL |
| 321230 | 2009 AM_{47} | — | January 2, 2009 | Mount Lemmon | Mount Lemmon Survey | KOR | 1.3 km | MPC · JPL |
| 321231 | 2009 BL_{6} | — | January 18, 2009 | Socorro | LINEAR | H | 580 m | MPC · JPL |
| 321232 | 2009 BJ_{11} | — | January 19, 2009 | Socorro | LINEAR | PHO | 1.5 km | MPC · JPL |
| 321233 | 2009 BR_{24} | — | January 17, 2009 | Catalina | CSS | · | 2.6 km | MPC · JPL |
| 321234 | 2009 BE_{31} | — | January 16, 2009 | Kitt Peak | Spacewatch | KOR | 1.6 km | MPC · JPL |
| 321235 | 2009 BL_{44} | — | January 16, 2009 | Kitt Peak | Spacewatch | · | 2.3 km | MPC · JPL |
| 321236 | 2009 BL_{45} | — | January 16, 2009 | Kitt Peak | Spacewatch | · | 1.4 km | MPC · JPL |
| 321237 | 2009 BP_{63} | — | January 20, 2009 | Mount Lemmon | Mount Lemmon Survey | · | 2.0 km | MPC · JPL |
| 321238 | 2009 BY_{81} | — | January 31, 2009 | Socorro | LINEAR | H | 880 m | MPC · JPL |
| 321239 | 2009 BL_{86} | — | January 25, 2009 | Kitt Peak | Spacewatch | · | 2.6 km | MPC · JPL |
| 321240 | 2009 BK_{87} | — | January 25, 2009 | Kitt Peak | Spacewatch | KOR | 1.8 km | MPC · JPL |
| 321241 | 2009 BX_{91} | — | January 25, 2009 | Kitt Peak | Spacewatch | · | 1.1 km | MPC · JPL |
| 321242 | 2009 BR_{93} | — | January 25, 2009 | Kitt Peak | Spacewatch | · | 940 m | MPC · JPL |
| 321243 | 2009 BO_{103} | — | January 25, 2009 | Kitt Peak | Spacewatch | · | 3.5 km | MPC · JPL |
| 321244 | 2009 BQ_{106} | — | January 27, 2009 | Purple Mountain | PMO NEO Survey Program | · | 2.8 km | MPC · JPL |
| 321245 | 2009 BV_{107} | — | January 29, 2009 | Mount Lemmon | Mount Lemmon Survey | · | 2.7 km | MPC · JPL |
| 321246 | 2009 BT_{113} | — | January 26, 2009 | Mount Lemmon | Mount Lemmon Survey | · | 2.0 km | MPC · JPL |
| 321247 | 2009 BF_{139} | — | January 29, 2009 | Kitt Peak | Spacewatch | · | 1.6 km | MPC · JPL |
| 321248 | 2009 BU_{149} | — | January 31, 2009 | Kitt Peak | Spacewatch | · | 2.8 km | MPC · JPL |
| 321249 | 2009 BC_{150} | — | January 31, 2009 | Kitt Peak | Spacewatch | AGN | 1.3 km | MPC · JPL |
| 321250 | 2009 BE_{167} | — | January 31, 2009 | Mount Lemmon | Mount Lemmon Survey | · | 1.1 km | MPC · JPL |
| 321251 | 2009 BP_{177} | — | January 30, 2009 | Mount Lemmon | Mount Lemmon Survey | · | 3.5 km | MPC · JPL |
| 321252 | 2009 CV_{7} | — | February 1, 2009 | Mount Lemmon | Mount Lemmon Survey | · | 3.5 km | MPC · JPL |
| 321253 | 2009 CV_{57} | — | February 2, 2009 | Mount Lemmon | Mount Lemmon Survey | · | 4.4 km | MPC · JPL |
| 321254 | 2009 CE_{64} | — | February 2, 2009 | Kitt Peak | Spacewatch | · | 910 m | MPC · JPL |
| 321255 | 2009 DL_{12} | — | October 15, 2001 | Palomar | NEAT | EOS | 3.1 km | MPC · JPL |
| 321256 | 2009 DB_{13} | — | February 16, 2009 | Kitt Peak | Spacewatch | · | 740 m | MPC · JPL |
| 321257 | 2009 DV_{13} | — | February 16, 2009 | Kitt Peak | Spacewatch | · | 960 m | MPC · JPL |
| 321258 | 2009 DD_{14} | — | February 16, 2009 | Kitt Peak | Spacewatch | · | 2.8 km | MPC · JPL |
| 321259 | 2009 DK_{15} | — | February 16, 2009 | La Sagra | OAM | · | 920 m | MPC · JPL |
| 321260 | 2009 DS_{35} | — | February 20, 2009 | Kitt Peak | Spacewatch | MAS | 820 m | MPC · JPL |
| 321261 | 2009 DL_{42} | — | February 18, 2009 | La Sagra | OAM | · | 4.2 km | MPC · JPL |
| 321262 | 2009 DU_{44} | — | February 27, 2009 | Dauban | Kugel, F. | V | 890 m | MPC · JPL |
| 321263 | 2009 DD_{54} | — | February 22, 2009 | Kitt Peak | Spacewatch | · | 1.3 km | MPC · JPL |
| 321264 | 2009 DX_{83} | — | February 26, 2009 | Kitt Peak | Spacewatch | · | 1.9 km | MPC · JPL |
| 321265 | 2009 DA_{85} | — | February 26, 2009 | Kitt Peak | Spacewatch | · | 620 m | MPC · JPL |
| 321266 | 2009 DK_{87} | — | February 27, 2009 | Catalina | CSS | · | 2.7 km | MPC · JPL |
| 321267 | 2009 DL_{106} | — | February 27, 2009 | Catalina | CSS | · | 3.9 km | MPC · JPL |
| 321268 | 2009 DL_{122} | — | February 27, 2009 | Kitt Peak | Spacewatch | · | 970 m | MPC · JPL |
| 321269 | 2009 DY_{132} | — | February 26, 2009 | Kitt Peak | Spacewatch | · | 870 m | MPC · JPL |
| 321270 | 2009 DA_{133} | — | February 27, 2009 | Kitt Peak | Spacewatch | · | 710 m | MPC · JPL |
| 321271 | 2009 DK_{135} | — | February 20, 2009 | Catalina | CSS | · | 2.7 km | MPC · JPL |
| 321272 | 2009 DQ_{135} | — | October 14, 2007 | Catalina | CSS | · | 940 m | MPC · JPL |
| 321273 | 2009 DU_{138} | — | February 20, 2009 | Kitt Peak | Spacewatch | · | 1.5 km | MPC · JPL |
| 321274 | 2009 DW_{142} | — | February 19, 2009 | Kitt Peak | Spacewatch | · | 790 m | MPC · JPL |
| 321275 | 2009 EX_{1} | — | March 1, 2009 | Kitt Peak | Spacewatch | · | 860 m | MPC · JPL |
| 321276 | 2009 EV_{4} | — | March 13, 2009 | La Cañada | Lacruz, J. | · | 740 m | MPC · JPL |
| 321277 | 2009 EQ_{9} | — | March 1, 2009 | Kitt Peak | Spacewatch | · | 1.2 km | MPC · JPL |
| 321278 | 2009 EW_{15} | — | March 15, 2009 | Kitt Peak | Spacewatch | · | 3.1 km | MPC · JPL |
| 321279 | 2009 EX_{17} | — | March 15, 2009 | Kitt Peak | Spacewatch | · | 2.2 km | MPC · JPL |
| 321280 | 2009 EB_{21} | — | March 15, 2009 | La Sagra | OAM | · | 4.2 km | MPC · JPL |
| 321281 | 2009 EN_{21} | — | March 15, 2009 | Kitt Peak | Spacewatch | · | 560 m | MPC · JPL |
| 321282 | 2009 EU_{22} | — | March 3, 2009 | Kitt Peak | Spacewatch | · | 610 m | MPC · JPL |
| 321283 | 2009 EX_{25} | — | September 18, 2007 | Mount Lemmon | Mount Lemmon Survey | · | 780 m | MPC · JPL |
| 321284 | 2009 FL_{5} | — | February 19, 2009 | Kitt Peak | Spacewatch | · | 760 m | MPC · JPL |
| 321285 | 2009 FL_{9} | — | March 16, 2009 | Mount Lemmon | Mount Lemmon Survey | CYB | 4.5 km | MPC · JPL |
| 321286 | 2009 FL_{14} | — | March 19, 2009 | Heppenheim | Starkenburg | · | 2.0 km | MPC · JPL |
| 321287 | 2009 FK_{17} | — | March 16, 2009 | La Sagra | OAM | · | 680 m | MPC · JPL |
| 321288 | 2009 FE_{21} | — | March 21, 2009 | Catalina | CSS | · | 660 m | MPC · JPL |
| 321289 | 2009 FW_{21} | — | March 18, 2009 | Kitt Peak | Spacewatch | NYS | 1.0 km | MPC · JPL |
| 321290 | 2009 FE_{22} | — | March 18, 2009 | Mount Lemmon | Mount Lemmon Survey | THM | 3.1 km | MPC · JPL |
| 321291 | 2009 FX_{22} | — | March 19, 2009 | Kitt Peak | Spacewatch | · | 1.1 km | MPC · JPL |
| 321292 | 2009 FX_{37} | — | March 24, 2009 | Mount Lemmon | Mount Lemmon Survey | · | 870 m | MPC · JPL |
| 321293 | 2009 FZ_{39} | — | November 8, 2007 | Mount Lemmon | Mount Lemmon Survey | · | 940 m | MPC · JPL |
| 321294 | 2009 FX_{41} | — | March 26, 2009 | Mount Lemmon | Mount Lemmon Survey | · | 610 m | MPC · JPL |
| 321295 | 2009 FH_{45} | — | March 19, 2009 | Catalina | CSS | H | 610 m | MPC · JPL |
| 321296 | 2009 FD_{54} | — | March 29, 2009 | Mount Lemmon | Mount Lemmon Survey | · | 940 m | MPC · JPL |
| 321297 | 2009 FL_{54} | — | March 29, 2009 | Mount Lemmon | Mount Lemmon Survey | · | 2.9 km | MPC · JPL |
| 321298 | 2009 FC_{55} | — | March 31, 2009 | Kitt Peak | Spacewatch | · | 600 m | MPC · JPL |
| 321299 | 2009 FU_{60} | — | March 21, 2009 | Kitt Peak | Spacewatch | · | 1.0 km | MPC · JPL |
| 321300 | 2009 FO_{61} | — | March 28, 2009 | Kitt Peak | Spacewatch | L5 | 10 km | MPC · JPL |

== 321301–321400 ==
back to top

| Designation | | | Discovery | | | Properties | | Ref |
| Permanent | Provisional | Named after | Date | Site | Discoverer(s) | Category | Diam. | Ref |
|---|---|---|---|---|---|---|---|---|
| 321301 | 2009 FR_{65} | — | March 18, 2009 | Kitt Peak | Spacewatch | · | 640 m | MPC · JPL |
| 321302 | 2009 FQ_{67} | — | March 28, 2009 | Kitt Peak | Spacewatch | · | 610 m | MPC · JPL |
| 321303 | 2009 FT_{67} | — | March 21, 2009 | Kitt Peak | Spacewatch | · | 1.2 km | MPC · JPL |
| 321304 | 2009 GQ | — | March 10, 2005 | Kitt Peak | Spacewatch | MAS | 830 m | MPC · JPL |
| 321305 | 2009 GA_{6} | — | April 1, 2009 | Kitt Peak | Spacewatch | · | 930 m | MPC · JPL |
| 321306 | 2009 HU_{4} | — | April 17, 2009 | Kitt Peak | Spacewatch | · | 4.1 km | MPC · JPL |
| 321307 | 2009 HZ_{7} | — | April 17, 2009 | Kitt Peak | Spacewatch | · | 890 m | MPC · JPL |
| 321308 | 2009 HZ_{16} | — | April 18, 2009 | Kitt Peak | Spacewatch | · | 3.7 km | MPC · JPL |
| 321309 | 2009 HO_{20} | — | April 18, 2009 | Mount Lemmon | Mount Lemmon Survey | · | 840 m | MPC · JPL |
| 321310 | 2009 HD_{29} | — | April 19, 2009 | Kitt Peak | Spacewatch | · | 830 m | MPC · JPL |
| 321311 | 2009 HX_{35} | — | April 20, 2009 | Kitt Peak | Spacewatch | · | 860 m | MPC · JPL |
| 321312 | 2009 HS_{37} | — | December 22, 2003 | Kitt Peak | Spacewatch | · | 1.9 km | MPC · JPL |
| 321313 | 2009 HQ_{38} | — | April 18, 2009 | Kitt Peak | Spacewatch | · | 1.4 km | MPC · JPL |
| 321314 | 2009 HO_{39} | — | April 18, 2009 | Mount Lemmon | Mount Lemmon Survey | · | 810 m | MPC · JPL |
| 321315 | 2009 HN_{45} | — | April 21, 2009 | La Sagra | OAM | · | 830 m | MPC · JPL |
| 321316 | 2009 HF_{51} | — | April 21, 2009 | Kitt Peak | Spacewatch | · | 1.5 km | MPC · JPL |
| 321317 | 2009 HJ_{52} | — | April 17, 2009 | Catalina | CSS | · | 900 m | MPC · JPL |
| 321318 | 2009 HM_{53} | — | April 20, 2009 | Kitt Peak | Spacewatch | · | 1.6 km | MPC · JPL |
| 321319 | 2009 HZ_{56} | — | April 22, 2009 | Kitt Peak | Spacewatch | (5) | 1.6 km | MPC · JPL |
| 321320 | 2009 HX_{58} | — | April 17, 2009 | Catalina | CSS | TIR | 3.5 km | MPC · JPL |
| 321321 | 2009 HJ_{59} | — | April 17, 2009 | Kitt Peak | Spacewatch | ERI | 2.0 km | MPC · JPL |
| 321322 | 2009 HD_{61} | — | April 20, 2009 | Mount Lemmon | Mount Lemmon Survey | V | 700 m | MPC · JPL |
| 321323 | 2009 HX_{65} | — | April 23, 2009 | Kitt Peak | Spacewatch | · | 950 m | MPC · JPL |
| 321324 Vytautas | 2009 HJ_{68} | Vytautas | April 25, 2009 | Baldone | K. Černis, I. Eglītis | HYG | 3.2 km | MPC · JPL |
| 321325 | 2009 HW_{75} | — | September 21, 2003 | Kitt Peak | Spacewatch | · | 790 m | MPC · JPL |
| 321326 | 2009 HJ_{77} | — | April 29, 2009 | Mayhill | Lowe, A. | · | 800 m | MPC · JPL |
| 321327 | 2009 HS_{77} | — | April 23, 2009 | La Sagra | OAM | (2076) | 960 m | MPC · JPL |
| 321328 | 2009 HX_{77} | — | July 3, 2005 | Palomar | NEAT | 615 | 2.0 km | MPC · JPL |
| 321329 | 2009 HB_{79} | — | August 29, 2006 | Kitt Peak | Spacewatch | · | 1.2 km | MPC · JPL |
| 321330 | 2009 HE_{79} | — | April 26, 2009 | Kitt Peak | Spacewatch | · | 700 m | MPC · JPL |
| 321331 | 2009 HC_{80} | — | April 28, 2009 | Catalina | CSS | · | 1.5 km | MPC · JPL |
| 321332 | 2009 HF_{90} | — | April 19, 2009 | Mount Lemmon | Mount Lemmon Survey | · | 890 m | MPC · JPL |
| 321333 | 2009 HO_{95} | — | January 31, 2004 | Kitt Peak | Spacewatch | · | 1.8 km | MPC · JPL |
| 321334 | 2009 HE_{98} | — | April 20, 2009 | Mount Lemmon | Mount Lemmon Survey | V | 650 m | MPC · JPL |
| 321335 | 2009 HG_{101} | — | March 4, 2005 | Mount Lemmon | Mount Lemmon Survey | · | 940 m | MPC · JPL |
| 321336 | 2009 HY_{103} | — | April 20, 2009 | Kitt Peak | Spacewatch | · | 2.9 km | MPC · JPL |
| 321337 | 2009 HF_{106} | — | April 22, 2009 | Socorro | LINEAR | · | 1.2 km | MPC · JPL |
| 321338 | 2009 JF_{11} | — | May 14, 2009 | Siding Spring | SSS | · | 2.1 km | MPC · JPL |
| 321339 | 2009 JT_{12} | — | May 15, 2009 | Kitt Peak | Spacewatch | (5) | 1.7 km | MPC · JPL |
| 321340 | 2009 JK_{13} | — | May 1, 2009 | Cerro Burek | Burek, Cerro | · | 1.0 km | MPC · JPL |
| 321341 | 2009 JF_{14} | — | May 1, 2009 | Cerro Burek | Burek, Cerro | NYS | 940 m | MPC · JPL |
| 321342 | 2009 JO_{14} | — | May 1, 2009 | Cerro Burek | Burek, Cerro | · | 980 m | MPC · JPL |
| 321343 | 2009 JF_{16} | — | May 4, 2009 | Mount Lemmon | Mount Lemmon Survey | · | 960 m | MPC · JPL |
| 321344 | 2009 JC_{18} | — | May 15, 2009 | Kitt Peak | Spacewatch | · | 1.3 km | MPC · JPL |
| 321345 | 2009 KT_{1} | — | April 18, 2009 | Kitt Peak | Spacewatch | · | 730 m | MPC · JPL |
| 321346 | 2009 KK_{4} | — | May 24, 2009 | Mayhill | Lowe, A. | GEF | 1.5 km | MPC · JPL |
| 321347 | 2009 KJ_{12} | — | May 25, 2009 | Kitt Peak | Spacewatch | THM | 2.3 km | MPC · JPL |
| 321348 | 2009 KC_{13} | — | May 25, 2009 | Kitt Peak | Spacewatch | MAR | 1.4 km | MPC · JPL |
| 321349 | 2009 KX_{14} | — | May 26, 2009 | Catalina | CSS | · | 820 m | MPC · JPL |
| 321350 | 2009 KC_{20} | — | March 31, 2003 | Kitt Peak | Spacewatch | · | 2.7 km | MPC · JPL |
| 321351 | 2009 KE_{29} | — | May 28, 2009 | Mount Lemmon | Mount Lemmon Survey | · | 2.2 km | MPC · JPL |
| 321352 | 2009 KV_{35} | — | May 16, 2009 | Kitt Peak | Spacewatch | EUN | 3.0 km | MPC · JPL |
| 321353 | 2009 LR_{4} | — | June 12, 2009 | Kitt Peak | Spacewatch | TIR | 3.6 km | MPC · JPL |
| 321354 | 2009 LU_{4} | — | June 13, 2009 | Kitt Peak | Spacewatch | L5 | 10 km | MPC · JPL |
| 321355 | 2009 LJ_{6} | — | June 15, 2009 | Mount Lemmon | Mount Lemmon Survey | · | 1.0 km | MPC · JPL |
| 321356 | 2009 MF | — | June 15, 2009 | XuYi | PMO NEO Survey Program | · | 1.4 km | MPC · JPL |
| 321357 Mirzakhani | 2009 MM | Mirzakhani | September 3, 1994 | La Silla | E. W. Elst | · | 1.5 km | MPC · JPL |
| 321358 | 2009 MK_{2} | — | October 23, 2006 | Kitt Peak | Spacewatch | NYS | 1.2 km | MPC · JPL |
| 321359 | 2009 MG_{5} | — | June 21, 2009 | Kitt Peak | Spacewatch | MAS | 800 m | MPC · JPL |
| 321360 | 2009 MM_{7} | — | October 16, 2006 | Catalina | CSS | · | 3.0 km | MPC · JPL |
| 321361 | 2009 MX_{7} | — | June 12, 2009 | Catalina | CSS | · | 1.6 km | MPC · JPL |
| 321362 | 2009 MA_{8} | — | June 26, 2009 | La Sagra | OAM | · | 1.7 km | MPC · JPL |
| 321363 | 2009 MK_{8} | — | June 24, 2009 | Eskridge | G. Hug | · | 1.3 km | MPC · JPL |
| 321364 | 2009 NP | — | July 13, 2009 | La Sagra | OAM | · | 1.6 km | MPC · JPL |
| 321365 | 2009 OD_{1} | — | July 16, 2009 | La Sagra | OAM | · | 760 m | MPC · JPL |
| 321366 | 2009 OE_{2} | — | July 16, 2009 | La Sagra | OAM | ADE | 2.6 km | MPC · JPL |
| 321367 | 2009 OF_{2} | — | July 16, 2009 | La Sagra | OAM | · | 1.4 km | MPC · JPL |
| 321368 | 2009 OM_{2} | — | July 19, 2009 | La Sagra | OAM | · | 2.1 km | MPC · JPL |
| 321369 | 2009 OT_{4} | — | September 15, 2004 | Siding Spring | SSS | · | 5.7 km | MPC · JPL |
| 321370 | 2009 OA_{6} | — | July 18, 2009 | La Sagra | OAM | EUN | 1.5 km | MPC · JPL |
| 321371 | 2009 OF_{6} | — | July 19, 2009 | La Sagra | OAM | · | 2.9 km | MPC · JPL |
| 321372 | 2009 OB_{7} | — | July 27, 2009 | Calvin-Rehoboth | Calvin College | · | 2.7 km | MPC · JPL |
| 321373 | 2009 OK_{8} | — | July 29, 2009 | Črni Vrh | Zakrajšek, J. | · | 5.6 km | MPC · JPL |
| 321374 | 2009 OT_{8} | — | July 26, 2009 | La Sagra | OAM | · | 3.5 km | MPC · JPL |
| 321375 | 2009 OX_{8} | — | July 27, 2009 | La Sagra | OAM | EUN | 1.5 km | MPC · JPL |
| 321376 | 2009 OZ_{9} | — | March 26, 2007 | Mount Lemmon | Mount Lemmon Survey | · | 4.3 km | MPC · JPL |
| 321377 | 2009 OQ_{15} | — | July 27, 2009 | Kitt Peak | Spacewatch | L4 | 15 km | MPC · JPL |
| 321378 | 2009 OU_{16} | — | July 28, 2009 | Kitt Peak | Spacewatch | · | 1.8 km | MPC · JPL |
| 321379 | 2009 OY_{18} | — | August 25, 2004 | Kitt Peak | Spacewatch | · | 2.5 km | MPC · JPL |
| 321380 | 2009 OE_{19} | — | July 28, 2009 | Kitt Peak | Spacewatch | · | 4.1 km | MPC · JPL |
| 321381 | 2009 OJ_{21} | — | July 25, 2009 | La Sagra | OAM | · | 1.7 km | MPC · JPL |
| 321382 | 2009 OG_{24} | — | July 27, 2009 | Kitt Peak | Spacewatch | · | 2.5 km | MPC · JPL |
| 321383 | 2009 PX_{1} | — | August 15, 2009 | Altschwendt | W. Ries | · | 2.6 km | MPC · JPL |
| 321384 | 2009 PN_{2} | — | August 13, 2009 | La Sagra | OAM | ERI | 2.5 km | MPC · JPL |
| 321385 | 2009 PQ_{2} | — | August 2, 2009 | Hibiscus | Teamo, N. | · | 870 m | MPC · JPL |
| 321386 | 2009 PX_{4} | — | August 15, 2009 | La Sagra | OAM | · | 1.5 km | MPC · JPL |
| 321387 | 2009 PE_{5} | — | December 14, 2006 | Kitt Peak | Spacewatch | · | 3.2 km | MPC · JPL |
| 321388 | 2009 PM_{7} | — | August 15, 2009 | Kitt Peak | Spacewatch | THM | 2.6 km | MPC · JPL |
| 321389 | 2009 PR_{7} | — | August 15, 2009 | Catalina | CSS | · | 2.9 km | MPC · JPL |
| 321390 | 2009 PJ_{9} | — | August 15, 2009 | Kitt Peak | Spacewatch | · | 3.6 km | MPC · JPL |
| 321391 | 2009 PU_{12} | — | August 15, 2009 | Catalina | CSS | · | 1.9 km | MPC · JPL |
| 321392 | 2009 PA_{13} | — | August 15, 2009 | Kitt Peak | Spacewatch | · | 1.7 km | MPC · JPL |
| 321393 | 2009 PD_{14} | — | August 15, 2009 | Kitt Peak | Spacewatch | AGN | 1.5 km | MPC · JPL |
| 321394 | 2009 PQ_{15} | — | August 15, 2009 | Kitt Peak | Spacewatch | EUN | 1.3 km | MPC · JPL |
| 321395 | 2009 PS_{15} | — | August 15, 2009 | Kitt Peak | Spacewatch | EOS | 2.6 km | MPC · JPL |
| 321396 | 2009 PT_{15} | — | August 15, 2009 | Kitt Peak | Spacewatch | · | 3.1 km | MPC · JPL |
| 321397 | 2009 PF_{16} | — | August 15, 2009 | Kitt Peak | Spacewatch | · | 3.1 km | MPC · JPL |
| 321398 | 2009 PH_{16} | — | August 15, 2009 | Kitt Peak | Spacewatch | EOS | 2.3 km | MPC · JPL |
| 321399 | 2009 PK_{17} | — | August 15, 2009 | La Sagra | OAM | · | 2.4 km | MPC · JPL |
| 321400 | 2009 PM_{18} | — | August 15, 2009 | Kitt Peak | Spacewatch | · | 2.5 km | MPC · JPL |

== 321401–321500 ==
back to top

| Designation | | | Discovery | | | Properties | | Ref |
| Permanent | Provisional | Named after | Date | Site | Discoverer(s) | Category | Diam. | Ref |
|---|---|---|---|---|---|---|---|---|
| 321401 | 2009 PN_{18} | — | August 15, 2009 | Kitt Peak | Spacewatch | · | 4.8 km | MPC · JPL |
| 321402 | 2009 PH_{20} | — | August 15, 2009 | Kitt Peak | Spacewatch | · | 2.6 km | MPC · JPL |
| 321403 | 2009 QJ | — | August 16, 2009 | Altschwendt | W. Ries | · | 3.5 km | MPC · JPL |
| 321404 | 2009 QP | — | August 16, 2009 | Vicques | M. Ory | · | 2.4 km | MPC · JPL |
| 321405 Ingehorst | 2009 QZ | Ingehorst | August 16, 2009 | Taunus | R. Kling, Zimmer, U. | · | 4.9 km | MPC · JPL |
| 321406 | 2009 QA_{1} | — | August 17, 2009 | Kitt Peak | Spacewatch | L4 | 12 km | MPC · JPL |
| 321407 | 2009 QB_{4} | — | August 17, 2009 | Kitt Peak | Spacewatch | · | 4.1 km | MPC · JPL |
| 321408 | 2009 QJ_{4} | — | August 17, 2009 | Catalina | CSS | · | 3.2 km | MPC · JPL |
| 321409 | 2009 QF_{5} | — | August 17, 2009 | Hibiscus | Hibiscus | · | 1.5 km | MPC · JPL |
| 321410 | 2009 QD_{6} | — | August 18, 2009 | Vicques | M. Ory | · | 4.0 km | MPC · JPL |
| 321411 | 2009 QM_{6} | — | August 17, 2009 | Tiki | Teamo, N. | · | 1.9 km | MPC · JPL |
| 321412 | 2009 QU_{10} | — | August 22, 2009 | Dauban | Kugel, F. | · | 4.5 km | MPC · JPL |
| 321413 | 2009 QC_{12} | — | August 16, 2009 | Kitt Peak | Spacewatch | (31811) | 4.0 km | MPC · JPL |
| 321414 | 2009 QE_{15} | — | August 16, 2009 | Kitt Peak | Spacewatch | EOS | 2.4 km | MPC · JPL |
| 321415 | 2009 QP_{15} | — | August 16, 2009 | Kitt Peak | Spacewatch | · | 2.2 km | MPC · JPL |
| 321416 | 2009 QR_{15} | — | August 16, 2009 | Kitt Peak | Spacewatch | · | 1.8 km | MPC · JPL |
| 321417 | 2009 QL_{16} | — | August 16, 2009 | Kitt Peak | Spacewatch | EOS | 2.3 km | MPC · JPL |
| 321418 | 2009 QQ_{16} | — | August 16, 2009 | Kitt Peak | Spacewatch | · | 2.5 km | MPC · JPL |
| 321419 | 2009 QR_{18} | — | August 17, 2009 | Kitt Peak | Spacewatch | · | 3.0 km | MPC · JPL |
| 321420 | 2009 QY_{19} | — | August 19, 2009 | La Sagra | OAM | · | 3.4 km | MPC · JPL |
| 321421 | 2009 QB_{21} | — | August 19, 2009 | La Sagra | OAM | · | 1.7 km | MPC · JPL |
| 321422 | 2009 QJ_{21} | — | August 19, 2009 | La Sagra | OAM | · | 2.5 km | MPC · JPL |
| 321423 | 2009 QH_{23} | — | August 16, 2009 | La Sagra | OAM | · | 2.3 km | MPC · JPL |
| 321424 | 2009 QQ_{25} | — | August 17, 2009 | La Sagra | OAM | MAS | 850 m | MPC · JPL |
| 321425 | 2009 QY_{25} | — | August 18, 2009 | La Sagra | OAM | · | 2.1 km | MPC · JPL |
| 321426 | 2009 QF_{28} | — | August 20, 2009 | La Sagra | OAM | (5) | 1.9 km | MPC · JPL |
| 321427 | 2009 QM_{32} | — | August 26, 2009 | Catalina | CSS | · | 5.8 km | MPC · JPL |
| 321428 | 2009 QK_{33} | — | August 24, 2009 | La Sagra | OAM | · | 4.9 km | MPC · JPL |
| 321429 | 2009 QL_{34} | — | August 26, 2009 | Plana | Fratev, F. | (31811) | 3.3 km | MPC · JPL |
| 321430 | 2009 QN_{35} | — | August 29, 2009 | La Sagra | OAM | · | 3.8 km | MPC · JPL |
| 321431 | 2009 QQ_{35} | — | August 29, 2009 | La Sagra | OAM | · | 4.2 km | MPC · JPL |
| 321432 | 2009 QT_{39} | — | August 20, 2009 | Kitt Peak | Spacewatch | BRA | 2.0 km | MPC · JPL |
| 321433 | 2009 QM_{42} | — | August 26, 2009 | La Sagra | OAM | · | 2.6 km | MPC · JPL |
| 321434 | 2009 QN_{42} | — | August 26, 2009 | La Sagra | OAM | NYS | 1.3 km | MPC · JPL |
| 321435 | 2009 QM_{44} | — | April 1, 2003 | Apache Point | SDSS | L4 | 10 km | MPC · JPL |
| 321436 | 2009 QF_{45} | — | August 27, 2009 | La Sagra | OAM | EUN | 1.6 km | MPC · JPL |
| 321437 | 2009 QR_{45} | — | August 28, 2009 | Kitt Peak | Spacewatch | · | 2.7 km | MPC · JPL |
| 321438 | 2009 QC_{48} | — | August 28, 2009 | La Sagra | OAM | · | 4.9 km | MPC · JPL |
| 321439 | 2009 QW_{50} | — | August 29, 2009 | Kitt Peak | Spacewatch | EOS | 2.3 km | MPC · JPL |
| 321440 | 2009 QR_{52} | — | August 20, 2009 | Kitt Peak | Spacewatch | · | 2.3 km | MPC · JPL |
| 321441 | 2009 QS_{52} | — | August 20, 2009 | Kitt Peak | Spacewatch | · | 2.4 km | MPC · JPL |
| 321442 | 2009 QG_{56} | — | August 28, 2009 | Catalina | CSS | URS | 3.8 km | MPC · JPL |
| 321443 | 2009 QO_{56} | — | August 18, 2009 | Kitt Peak | Spacewatch | DOR | 3.5 km | MPC · JPL |
| 321444 | 2009 QZ_{57} | — | August 16, 2009 | Kitt Peak | Spacewatch | · | 3.7 km | MPC · JPL |
| 321445 | 2009 QA_{58} | — | August 16, 2009 | Kitt Peak | Spacewatch | · | 3.0 km | MPC · JPL |
| 321446 | 2009 QR_{58} | — | August 16, 2009 | Kitt Peak | Spacewatch | · | 1.3 km | MPC · JPL |
| 321447 | 2009 QJ_{60} | — | August 16, 2009 | Kitt Peak | Spacewatch | THM | 2.9 km | MPC · JPL |
| 321448 | 2009 QS_{60} | — | August 19, 2009 | Kitt Peak | Spacewatch | (11882) | 2.1 km | MPC · JPL |
| 321449 | 2009 QW_{60} | — | August 22, 2009 | La Sagra | OAM | LUT | 5.4 km | MPC · JPL |
| 321450 | 2009 QN_{63} | — | August 20, 2009 | La Sagra | OAM | · | 2.4 km | MPC · JPL |
| 321451 | 2009 RZ_{1} | — | March 20, 2002 | Kitt Peak | Spacewatch | · | 2.6 km | MPC · JPL |
| 321452 | 2009 RC_{2} | — | September 10, 2009 | Bisei SG Center | BATTeRS | · | 4.6 km | MPC · JPL |
| 321453 Alexmarieann | 2009 RM_{2} | Alexmarieann | September 10, 2009 | ESA OGS | Busch, M., Kresken, R. | T_{j} (2.95) | 4.8 km | MPC · JPL |
| 321454 | 2009 RZ_{6} | — | September 10, 2009 | Catalina | CSS | · | 3.0 km | MPC · JPL |
| 321455 | 2009 RX_{11} | — | September 12, 2009 | Kitt Peak | Spacewatch | · | 2.2 km | MPC · JPL |
| 321456 | 2009 RF_{12} | — | September 12, 2009 | Kitt Peak | Spacewatch | · | 1.4 km | MPC · JPL |
| 321457 | 2009 RJ_{22} | — | September 15, 2009 | Kitt Peak | Spacewatch | WIT | 1.2 km | MPC · JPL |
| 321458 | 2009 RL_{22} | — | August 14, 2009 | La Sagra | OAM | · | 5.5 km | MPC · JPL |
| 321459 | 2009 RG_{23} | — | September 15, 2009 | Kitt Peak | Spacewatch | · | 2.9 km | MPC · JPL |
| 321460 | 2009 RR_{27} | — | September 10, 2009 | Catalina | CSS | · | 5.7 km | MPC · JPL |
| 321461 | 2009 RG_{28} | — | September 11, 2009 | Catalina | CSS | · | 1.2 km | MPC · JPL |
| 321462 | 2009 RY_{36} | — | September 15, 2009 | Kitt Peak | Spacewatch | · | 2.0 km | MPC · JPL |
| 321463 | 2009 RT_{38} | — | September 15, 2009 | Kitt Peak | Spacewatch | · | 2.0 km | MPC · JPL |
| 321464 | 2009 RO_{41} | — | September 15, 2009 | Kitt Peak | Spacewatch | · | 3.1 km | MPC · JPL |
| 321465 | 2009 RB_{43} | — | September 15, 2009 | Kitt Peak | Spacewatch | · | 3.8 km | MPC · JPL |
| 321466 | 2009 RM_{43} | — | September 15, 2009 | Kitt Peak | Spacewatch | EOS | 2.5 km | MPC · JPL |
| 321467 | 2009 RP_{45} | — | September 15, 2009 | Kitt Peak | Spacewatch | · | 3.5 km | MPC · JPL |
| 321468 | 2009 RH_{48} | — | September 15, 2009 | Kitt Peak | Spacewatch | · | 4.4 km | MPC · JPL |
| 321469 | 2009 RO_{48} | — | September 15, 2009 | Kitt Peak | Spacewatch | DOR | 3.3 km | MPC · JPL |
| 321470 | 2009 RB_{49} | — | September 15, 2009 | Kitt Peak | Spacewatch | · | 4.0 km | MPC · JPL |
| 321471 | 2009 RZ_{49} | — | September 15, 2009 | Kitt Peak | Spacewatch | · | 1.4 km | MPC · JPL |
| 321472 | 2009 RJ_{53} | — | September 15, 2009 | Kitt Peak | Spacewatch | · | 4.9 km | MPC · JPL |
| 321473 | 2009 RB_{60} | — | August 16, 2009 | Catalina | CSS | · | 4.7 km | MPC · JPL |
| 321474 | 2009 RK_{61} | — | September 11, 2009 | La Sagra | OAM | TIR | 4.1 km | MPC · JPL |
| 321475 | 2009 RU_{62} | — | September 10, 2009 | Catalina | CSS | · | 3.8 km | MPC · JPL |
| 321476 | 2009 RJ_{65} | — | September 15, 2009 | Kitt Peak | Spacewatch | · | 3.3 km | MPC · JPL |
| 321477 | 2009 RO_{65} | — | September 15, 2009 | Siding Spring | SSS | · | 3.0 km | MPC · JPL |
| 321478 | 2009 RJ_{69} | — | September 15, 2009 | Mount Lemmon | Mount Lemmon Survey | MRX | 1.3 km | MPC · JPL |
| 321479 | 2009 RK_{69} | — | September 15, 2009 | Mount Lemmon | Mount Lemmon Survey | · | 3.6 km | MPC · JPL |
| 321480 Juanluiscano | 2009 RZ_{69} | Juanluiscano | September 10, 2009 | ESA OGS | ESA OGS | EOS | 2.5 km | MPC · JPL |
| 321481 | 2009 RC_{71} | — | September 15, 2009 | Kitt Peak | Spacewatch | THM | 2.4 km | MPC · JPL |
| 321482 | 2009 RU_{71} | — | September 15, 2009 | Kitt Peak | Spacewatch | · | 3.5 km | MPC · JPL |
| 321483 | 2009 SW_{4} | — | September 16, 2009 | Mount Lemmon | Mount Lemmon Survey | EOS | 2.6 km | MPC · JPL |
| 321484 Marsaalam | 2009 SZ_{13} | Marsaalam | September 17, 2009 | Zelenchukskaya Stn | T. V. Krjačko | · | 4.1 km | MPC · JPL |
| 321485 Cross | 2009 SK_{19} | Cross | September 18, 2009 | Saint-Sulpice | B. Christophe | MAS | 1.0 km | MPC · JPL |
| 321486 | 2009 SN_{25} | — | September 16, 2009 | Kitt Peak | Spacewatch | · | 4.5 km | MPC · JPL |
| 321487 | 2009 SZ_{38} | — | March 16, 2007 | Kitt Peak | Spacewatch | · | 3.1 km | MPC · JPL |
| 321488 | 2009 SW_{39} | — | September 16, 2009 | Kitt Peak | Spacewatch | · | 2.4 km | MPC · JPL |
| 321489 | 2009 SR_{44} | — | September 16, 2009 | Kitt Peak | Spacewatch | · | 2.7 km | MPC · JPL |
| 321490 | 2009 SH_{54} | — | September 17, 2009 | Mount Lemmon | Mount Lemmon Survey | · | 2.7 km | MPC · JPL |
| 321491 | 2009 SA_{61} | — | September 17, 2009 | Kitt Peak | Spacewatch | · | 2.1 km | MPC · JPL |
| 321492 | 2009 SD_{62} | — | September 17, 2009 | Mount Lemmon | Mount Lemmon Survey | · | 1.7 km | MPC · JPL |
| 321493 | 2009 SM_{66} | — | September 17, 2009 | Kitt Peak | Spacewatch | · | 4.7 km | MPC · JPL |
| 321494 | 2009 ST_{72} | — | April 13, 2004 | Kitt Peak | Spacewatch | · | 1.3 km | MPC · JPL |
| 321495 | 2009 SN_{73} | — | September 17, 2009 | Mount Lemmon | Mount Lemmon Survey | · | 3.6 km | MPC · JPL |
| 321496 | 2009 SO_{77} | — | September 17, 2009 | Kitt Peak | Spacewatch | · | 1.6 km | MPC · JPL |
| 321497 | 2009 SF_{78} | — | September 18, 2009 | Kitt Peak | Spacewatch | · | 2.0 km | MPC · JPL |
| 321498 | 2009 ST_{98} | — | September 22, 2009 | Dauban | Kugel, F. | · | 2.8 km | MPC · JPL |
| 321499 | 2009 SE_{120} | — | September 18, 2009 | Kitt Peak | Spacewatch | HYG | 3.1 km | MPC · JPL |
| 321500 | 2009 SC_{124} | — | September 18, 2009 | Kitt Peak | Spacewatch | · | 730 m | MPC · JPL |

== 321501–321600 ==
back to top

| Designation | | | Discovery | | | Properties | | Ref |
| Permanent | Provisional | Named after | Date | Site | Discoverer(s) | Category | Diam. | Ref |
|---|---|---|---|---|---|---|---|---|
| 321501 | 2009 SD_{129} | — | September 18, 2009 | Kitt Peak | Spacewatch | · | 2.9 km | MPC · JPL |
| 321502 | 2009 SY_{130} | — | September 18, 2009 | Kitt Peak | Spacewatch | · | 3.8 km | MPC · JPL |
| 321503 | 2009 SV_{150} | — | September 20, 2009 | Kitt Peak | Spacewatch | · | 2.8 km | MPC · JPL |
| 321504 | 2009 SU_{153} | — | September 20, 2009 | Kitt Peak | Spacewatch | · | 2.9 km | MPC · JPL |
| 321505 | 2009 SH_{165} | — | July 29, 2009 | Kitt Peak | Spacewatch | EUN | 1.6 km | MPC · JPL |
| 321506 | 2009 SZ_{167} | — | September 25, 2009 | Sierra Stars | R. Matson | LUT | 4.7 km | MPC · JPL |
| 321507 | 2009 SS_{169} | — | September 26, 2009 | Modra | Gajdoš, S., Világi, J. | · | 2.1 km | MPC · JPL |
| 321508 | 2009 SE_{170} | — | March 23, 2003 | Palomar | NEAT | · | 2.9 km | MPC · JPL |
| 321509 | 2009 SG_{172} | — | September 21, 2009 | Catalina | CSS | VER | 3.9 km | MPC · JPL |
| 321510 | 2009 SV_{180} | — | September 21, 2009 | Mount Lemmon | Mount Lemmon Survey | · | 3.3 km | MPC · JPL |
| 321511 | 2009 SW_{182} | — | October 6, 2005 | Mount Lemmon | Mount Lemmon Survey | · | 1.9 km | MPC · JPL |
| 321512 | 2009 SY_{189} | — | September 22, 2009 | Kitt Peak | Spacewatch | (194) | 2.5 km | MPC · JPL |
| 321513 | 2009 SG_{193} | — | April 22, 2004 | Kitt Peak | Spacewatch | L4 | 10 km | MPC · JPL |
| 321514 | 2009 SV_{200} | — | September 22, 2009 | Catalina | CSS | · | 4.0 km | MPC · JPL |
| 321515 | 2009 SK_{201} | — | December 13, 2006 | Mount Lemmon | Mount Lemmon Survey | · | 820 m | MPC · JPL |
| 321516 | 2009 SM_{203} | — | September 22, 2009 | Kitt Peak | Spacewatch | · | 3.4 km | MPC · JPL |
| 321517 | 2009 SW_{205} | — | September 22, 2009 | Kitt Peak | Spacewatch | · | 920 m | MPC · JPL |
| 321518 | 2009 SE_{208} | — | September 23, 2009 | Kitt Peak | Spacewatch | · | 2.3 km | MPC · JPL |
| 321519 | 2009 SC_{213} | — | September 23, 2009 | Kitt Peak | Spacewatch | (5) | 1.9 km | MPC · JPL |
| 321520 | 2009 SS_{217} | — | September 24, 2009 | Kitt Peak | Spacewatch | · | 3.9 km | MPC · JPL |
| 321521 | 2009 SO_{230} | — | August 26, 1998 | Kitt Peak | Spacewatch | EOS | 2.5 km | MPC · JPL |
| 321522 | 2009 SB_{231} | — | September 18, 2009 | Mount Lemmon | Mount Lemmon Survey | KOR | 1.6 km | MPC · JPL |
| 321523 | 2009 SS_{232} | — | September 19, 2009 | Catalina | CSS | · | 3.1 km | MPC · JPL |
| 321524 | 2009 SA_{233} | — | September 19, 2009 | Catalina | CSS | HYG | 3.7 km | MPC · JPL |
| 321525 | 2009 SD_{235} | — | September 18, 2009 | Mount Lemmon | Mount Lemmon Survey | · | 1.5 km | MPC · JPL |
| 321526 | 2009 ST_{235} | — | September 18, 2009 | Kitt Peak | Spacewatch | L4 | 9.9 km | MPC · JPL |
| 321527 | 2009 SM_{236} | — | December 13, 2004 | Catalina | CSS | · | 4.6 km | MPC · JPL |
| 321528 | 2009 SL_{238} | — | April 20, 2004 | Kitt Peak | Spacewatch | · | 2.0 km | MPC · JPL |
| 321529 | 2009 SQ_{242} | — | September 24, 2009 | Catalina | CSS | · | 3.2 km | MPC · JPL |
| 321530 | 2009 SR_{249} | — | September 18, 2009 | Kitt Peak | Spacewatch | · | 4.1 km | MPC · JPL |
| 321531 | 2009 SN_{258} | — | December 1, 1994 | Kitt Peak | Spacewatch | · | 2.6 km | MPC · JPL |
| 321532 | 2009 SZ_{258} | — | September 27, 2003 | Kitt Peak | Spacewatch | · | 4.2 km | MPC · JPL |
| 321533 | 2009 SS_{261} | — | January 25, 2006 | Kitt Peak | Spacewatch | · | 2.6 km | MPC · JPL |
| 321534 | 2009 SP_{264} | — | September 23, 2009 | Mount Lemmon | Mount Lemmon Survey | · | 2.9 km | MPC · JPL |
| 321535 | 2009 SC_{266} | — | September 23, 2009 | Mount Lemmon | Mount Lemmon Survey | EOS | 2.6 km | MPC · JPL |
| 321536 | 2009 SP_{270} | — | October 13, 1999 | Kitt Peak | Spacewatch | · | 2.7 km | MPC · JPL |
| 321537 | 2009 SF_{271} | — | September 24, 2009 | Kitt Peak | Spacewatch | EUN | 1.8 km | MPC · JPL |
| 321538 | 2009 SR_{272} | — | August 4, 2003 | Kitt Peak | Spacewatch | · | 5.1 km | MPC · JPL |
| 321539 | 2009 SO_{273} | — | September 25, 2009 | Kitt Peak | Spacewatch | · | 1.0 km | MPC · JPL |
| 321540 | 2009 SM_{275} | — | September 25, 2009 | Kitt Peak | Spacewatch | · | 3.9 km | MPC · JPL |
| 321541 | 2009 SW_{275} | — | September 25, 2009 | Kitt Peak | Spacewatch | · | 1.7 km | MPC · JPL |
| 321542 | 2009 SJ_{276} | — | September 25, 2009 | Kitt Peak | Spacewatch | KOR | 1.5 km | MPC · JPL |
| 321543 | 2009 SP_{276} | — | September 25, 2009 | Kitt Peak | Spacewatch | · | 950 m | MPC · JPL |
| 321544 | 2009 SQ_{276} | — | September 25, 2009 | Kitt Peak | Spacewatch | · | 2.1 km | MPC · JPL |
| 321545 | 2009 SY_{277} | — | September 25, 2009 | Kitt Peak | Spacewatch | · | 2.5 km | MPC · JPL |
| 321546 | 2009 SN_{279} | — | September 25, 2009 | Kitt Peak | Spacewatch | · | 4.0 km | MPC · JPL |
| 321547 | 2009 SJ_{281} | — | September 25, 2009 | Kitt Peak | Spacewatch | · | 2.2 km | MPC · JPL |
| 321548 | 2009 SV_{283} | — | September 25, 2009 | Kitt Peak | Spacewatch | · | 1.9 km | MPC · JPL |
| 321549 | 2009 SD_{290} | — | September 25, 2009 | Kitt Peak | Spacewatch | · | 1.9 km | MPC · JPL |
| 321550 | 2009 SL_{290} | — | September 25, 2009 | Kitt Peak | Spacewatch | · | 2.5 km | MPC · JPL |
| 321551 | 2009 SN_{290} | — | September 25, 2009 | Kitt Peak | Spacewatch | · | 4.2 km | MPC · JPL |
| 321552 | 2009 SP_{290} | — | September 25, 2009 | Kitt Peak | Spacewatch | · | 860 m | MPC · JPL |
| 321553 | 2009 SN_{316} | — | September 19, 2009 | Mount Lemmon | Mount Lemmon Survey | DOR | 2.6 km | MPC · JPL |
| 321554 | 2009 SN_{321} | — | September 21, 2009 | Kitt Peak | Spacewatch | · | 2.8 km | MPC · JPL |
| 321555 | 2009 SW_{328} | — | September 16, 2009 | Kitt Peak | Spacewatch | EUN | 1.9 km | MPC · JPL |
| 321556 | 2009 ST_{329} | — | September 17, 2009 | Catalina | CSS | · | 3.4 km | MPC · JPL |
| 321557 | 2009 SW_{334} | — | September 27, 2009 | Mount Lemmon | Mount Lemmon Survey | · | 3.2 km | MPC · JPL |
| 321558 | 2009 SX_{337} | — | September 28, 2009 | Catalina | CSS | EOS | 4.0 km | MPC · JPL |
| 321559 | 2009 SB_{338} | — | September 28, 2009 | Catalina | CSS | · | 3.6 km | MPC · JPL |
| 321560 | 2009 SJ_{339} | — | September 18, 2009 | Kitt Peak | Spacewatch | EOS | 2.7 km | MPC · JPL |
| 321561 | 2009 SX_{342} | — | September 17, 2009 | Kitt Peak | Spacewatch | · | 2.5 km | MPC · JPL |
| 321562 | 2009 SF_{349} | — | September 23, 2009 | Kitt Peak | Spacewatch | · | 2.3 km | MPC · JPL |
| 321563 | 2009 SL_{351} | — | September 17, 2009 | Mount Lemmon | Mount Lemmon Survey | · | 2.0 km | MPC · JPL |
| 321564 | 2009 SF_{354} | — | September 19, 2009 | Mount Lemmon | Mount Lemmon Survey | (18466) | 4.0 km | MPC · JPL |
| 321565 | 2009 SL_{355} | — | September 19, 2009 | Mount Lemmon | Mount Lemmon Survey | · | 1.4 km | MPC · JPL |
| 321566 | 2009 SM_{356} | — | September 17, 2009 | Kitt Peak | Spacewatch | · | 3.0 km | MPC · JPL |
| 321567 | 2009 ST_{356} | — | September 18, 2009 | Kitt Peak | Spacewatch | · | 3.8 km | MPC · JPL |
| 321568 | 2009 SN_{358} | — | September 17, 2009 | Kitt Peak | Spacewatch | · | 4.2 km | MPC · JPL |
| 321569 | 2009 SA_{359} | — | September 20, 2009 | Bisei SG Center | BATTeRS | · | 2.6 km | MPC · JPL |
| 321570 | 2009 SE_{361} | — | September 13, 1996 | La Silla | Uppsala-DLR Trojan Survey | L4 · HEK | 10 km | MPC · JPL |
| 321571 | 2009 SS_{362} | — | September 18, 2009 | Kitt Peak | Spacewatch | HYG | 3.2 km | MPC · JPL |
| 321572 | 2009 TG | — | October 1, 2009 | Kitt Peak | Spacewatch | · | 4.2 km | MPC · JPL |
| 321573 | 2009 TX_{8} | — | October 14, 2009 | Marly | P. Kocher | · | 3.3 km | MPC · JPL |
| 321574 | 2009 TQ_{12} | — | October 10, 2009 | Dauban | Kugel, F. | EOS | 2.0 km | MPC · JPL |
| 321575 | 2009 TZ_{14} | — | October 15, 2009 | Dauban | Kugel, F. | · | 2.7 km | MPC · JPL |
| 321576 | 2009 TY_{20} | — | October 11, 2009 | La Sagra | OAM | · | 3.6 km | MPC · JPL |
| 321577 Keanureeves | 2009 TA_{27} | Keanureeves | October 14, 2009 | Zelenchukskaya Stn | T. V. Krjačko | EOS | 3.2 km | MPC · JPL |
| 321578 | 2009 TT_{36} | — | October 15, 2009 | Catalina | CSS | · | 2.1 km | MPC · JPL |
| 321579 | 2009 TS_{44} | — | October 14, 2009 | Catalina | CSS | · | 2.8 km | MPC · JPL |
| 321580 | 2009 TF_{46} | — | October 11, 2009 | Mount Lemmon | Mount Lemmon Survey | L4 | 8.5 km | MPC · JPL |
| 321581 | 2009 TA_{48} | — | October 15, 2009 | Mount Lemmon | Mount Lemmon Survey | · | 2.0 km | MPC · JPL |
| 321582 | 2009 UV_{8} | — | October 16, 2009 | Mount Lemmon | Mount Lemmon Survey | · | 2.4 km | MPC · JPL |
| 321583 | 2009 UM_{9} | — | October 16, 2009 | Mount Lemmon | Mount Lemmon Survey | · | 2.3 km | MPC · JPL |
| 321584 | 2009 UG_{21} | — | October 24, 2009 | Catalina | CSS | L4 | 10 km | MPC · JPL |
| 321585 | 2009 UP_{25} | — | October 18, 2009 | La Sagra | OAM | · | 2.2 km | MPC · JPL |
| 321586 | 2009 UV_{28} | — | March 18, 2002 | Kitt Peak | Spacewatch | KOR | 1.5 km | MPC · JPL |
| 321587 | 2009 UF_{62} | — | October 17, 2009 | Mount Lemmon | Mount Lemmon Survey | EOS | 3.3 km | MPC · JPL |
| 321588 | 2009 UD_{66} | — | October 17, 2009 | Mount Lemmon | Mount Lemmon Survey | · | 2.1 km | MPC · JPL |
| 321589 | 2009 UU_{71} | — | October 22, 2009 | Catalina | CSS | · | 3.4 km | MPC · JPL |
| 321590 | 2009 UE_{72} | — | October 23, 2009 | Mount Lemmon | Mount Lemmon Survey | L4 | 13 km | MPC · JPL |
| 321591 | 2009 UC_{86} | — | October 24, 2009 | Mount Lemmon | Mount Lemmon Survey | · | 4.3 km | MPC · JPL |
| 321592 | 2009 UK_{94} | — | August 24, 2000 | Socorro | LINEAR | · | 1.8 km | MPC · JPL |
| 321593 | 2009 UQ_{97} | — | October 23, 2009 | Mount Lemmon | Mount Lemmon Survey | · | 3.6 km | MPC · JPL |
| 321594 | 2009 UC_{108} | — | October 23, 2009 | Kitt Peak | Spacewatch | · | 5.3 km | MPC · JPL |
| 321595 | 2009 UM_{116} | — | October 22, 2009 | Mount Lemmon | Mount Lemmon Survey | TEL | 2.0 km | MPC · JPL |
| 321596 | 2009 UY_{124} | — | September 17, 2003 | Kitt Peak | Spacewatch | · | 2.6 km | MPC · JPL |
| 321597 | 2009 UZ_{126} | — | October 22, 2009 | Catalina | CSS | L4 | 12 km | MPC · JPL |
| 321598 | 2009 UN_{137} | — | October 16, 2009 | Catalina | CSS | EOS | 2.7 km | MPC · JPL |
| 321599 | 2009 UJ_{140} | — | October 18, 2009 | Mount Lemmon | Mount Lemmon Survey | L4 | 7.2 km | MPC · JPL |
| 321600 | 2009 UP_{140} | — | October 26, 2009 | Kitt Peak | Spacewatch | · | 2.8 km | MPC · JPL |

== 321601–321700 ==
back to top

| Designation | | | Discovery | | | Properties | | Ref |
| Permanent | Provisional | Named after | Date | Site | Discoverer(s) | Category | Diam. | Ref |
|---|---|---|---|---|---|---|---|---|
| 321601 | 2009 UB_{146} | — | October 27, 2009 | Catalina | CSS | · | 4.4 km | MPC · JPL |
| 321602 | 2009 UZ_{147} | — | October 18, 2009 | Mount Lemmon | Mount Lemmon Survey | · | 2.5 km | MPC · JPL |
| 321603 | 2009 US_{148} | — | October 23, 2009 | Kitt Peak | Spacewatch | L4 | 9.5 km | MPC · JPL |
| 321604 | 2009 VV_{2} | — | August 23, 2007 | Kitt Peak | Spacewatch | L4 | 12 km | MPC · JPL |
| 321605 | 2009 VQ_{11} | — | November 8, 2009 | Mount Lemmon | Mount Lemmon Survey | 3:2 | 6.5 km | MPC · JPL |
| 321606 | 2009 VK_{21} | — | November 9, 2009 | Mount Lemmon | Mount Lemmon Survey | · | 2.5 km | MPC · JPL |
| 321607 | 2009 VN_{39} | — | November 10, 2009 | Mount Lemmon | Mount Lemmon Survey | · | 4.5 km | MPC · JPL |
| 321608 | 2009 VB_{45} | — | November 11, 2009 | Socorro | LINEAR | · | 1.3 km | MPC · JPL |
| 321609 | 2009 VV_{45} | — | November 8, 2009 | Kitt Peak | Spacewatch | · | 2.4 km | MPC · JPL |
| 321610 | 2009 VG_{50} | — | October 14, 2009 | Mount Lemmon | Mount Lemmon Survey | L4 | 10 km | MPC · JPL |
| 321611 | 2009 VG_{58} | — | October 23, 2009 | Mount Lemmon | Mount Lemmon Survey | L4 | 16 km | MPC · JPL |
| 321612 | 2009 VS_{82} | — | November 8, 2009 | Kitt Peak | Spacewatch | MAS | 880 m | MPC · JPL |
| 321613 | 2009 VA_{86} | — | November 10, 2009 | Kitt Peak | Spacewatch | L4 | 12 km | MPC · JPL |
| 321614 | 2009 VS_{92} | — | November 8, 2009 | Catalina | CSS | · | 2.2 km | MPC · JPL |
| 321615 | 2009 VG_{100} | — | November 10, 2009 | Kitt Peak | Spacewatch | · | 4.6 km | MPC · JPL |
| 321616 | 2009 VR_{107} | — | November 8, 2009 | Mount Lemmon | Mount Lemmon Survey | L4 | 10 km | MPC · JPL |
| 321617 | 2009 WT_{33} | — | November 11, 2004 | Kitt Peak | Spacewatch | KOR | 1.6 km | MPC · JPL |
| 321618 | 2009 WQ_{35} | — | November 17, 2009 | Kitt Peak | Spacewatch | CYB | 4.8 km | MPC · JPL |
| 321619 | 2009 WQ_{53} | — | October 20, 2006 | Mount Lemmon | Mount Lemmon Survey | · | 1.1 km | MPC · JPL |
| 321620 | 2009 WX_{62} | — | March 26, 2003 | Kitt Peak | Spacewatch | · | 2.1 km | MPC · JPL |
| 321621 | 2009 WC_{69} | — | November 17, 2009 | Mount Lemmon | Mount Lemmon Survey | V | 990 m | MPC · JPL |
| 321622 | 2009 WU_{72} | — | November 18, 2009 | Kitt Peak | Spacewatch | · | 4.5 km | MPC · JPL |
| 321623 | 2009 WF_{88} | — | November 19, 2009 | Vail-Jarnac | Jarnac | · | 2.2 km | MPC · JPL |
| 321624 | 2009 WF_{90} | — | November 19, 2009 | Kitt Peak | Spacewatch | V | 990 m | MPC · JPL |
| 321625 | 2009 WR_{99} | — | November 21, 2009 | Kitt Peak | Spacewatch | L4 | 9.3 km | MPC · JPL |
| 321626 | 2009 WC_{100} | — | November 21, 2009 | Kitt Peak | Spacewatch | THM | 2.8 km | MPC · JPL |
| 321627 | 2009 WB_{102} | — | October 2, 2008 | Kitt Peak | Spacewatch | L4 | 7.4 km | MPC · JPL |
| 321628 | 2009 WV_{107} | — | November 17, 2009 | Mount Lemmon | Mount Lemmon Survey | L4 | 7.9 km | MPC · JPL |
| 321629 | 2009 WO_{121} | — | November 20, 2009 | Kitt Peak | Spacewatch | · | 1.7 km | MPC · JPL |
| 321630 | 2009 WO_{150} | — | November 19, 2009 | Mount Lemmon | Mount Lemmon Survey | HIL · 3:2 | 8.1 km | MPC · JPL |
| 321631 | 2009 WU_{167} | — | October 8, 2008 | Kitt Peak | Spacewatch | L4 | 8.2 km | MPC · JPL |
| 321632 | 2009 WF_{195} | — | November 25, 2009 | La Sagra | OAM | · | 3.7 km | MPC · JPL |
| 321633 | 2009 WQ_{205} | — | February 21, 2001 | Kitt Peak | Spacewatch | · | 800 m | MPC · JPL |
| 321634 | 2009 WU_{211} | — | October 21, 1995 | Kitt Peak | Spacewatch | · | 2.2 km | MPC · JPL |
| 321635 | 2009 WD_{215} | — | November 22, 2009 | Kitt Peak | Spacewatch | · | 7.2 km | MPC · JPL |
| 321636 | 2009 WU_{220} | — | November 16, 2009 | Mount Lemmon | Mount Lemmon Survey | · | 2.1 km | MPC · JPL |
| 321637 | 2009 WP_{227} | — | October 10, 2004 | Kitt Peak | Spacewatch | KOR | 1.6 km | MPC · JPL |
| 321638 | 2009 WM_{249} | — | February 17, 2004 | Kitt Peak | Spacewatch | · | 700 m | MPC · JPL |
| 321639 | 2009 XF_{3} | — | July 15, 2002 | Palomar | NEAT | · | 4.8 km | MPC · JPL |
| 321640 | 2009 XW_{10} | — | December 10, 2009 | Mount Lemmon | Mount Lemmon Survey | · | 1.3 km | MPC · JPL |
| 321641 | 2010 AV_{5} | — | January 5, 2010 | Kitt Peak | Spacewatch | · | 1.5 km | MPC · JPL |
| 321642 | 2010 AG_{25} | — | November 4, 2004 | Kitt Peak | Spacewatch | · | 1.6 km | MPC · JPL |
| 321643 | 2010 AT_{26} | — | January 6, 2010 | Mount Lemmon | Mount Lemmon Survey | · | 2.7 km | MPC · JPL |
| 321644 | 2010 AD_{29} | — | February 1, 2005 | Kitt Peak | Spacewatch | · | 6.8 km | MPC · JPL |
| 321645 | 2010 AC_{56} | — | January 8, 2010 | Kitt Peak | Spacewatch | NAE | 4.1 km | MPC · JPL |
| 321646 | 2010 AA_{67} | — | January 11, 2010 | Kitt Peak | Spacewatch | EOS | 3.4 km | MPC · JPL |
| 321647 | 2010 AB_{75} | — | January 6, 2010 | Socorro | LINEAR | · | 2.6 km | MPC · JPL |
| 321648 | 2010 AC_{78} | — | January 12, 2010 | Mount Lemmon | Mount Lemmon Survey | · | 2.8 km | MPC · JPL |
| 321649 | 2010 AP_{84} | — | March 24, 2001 | Anderson Mesa | LONEOS | LIX | 6.4 km | MPC · JPL |
| 321650 | 2010 BH_{6} | — | January 21, 2010 | La Sagra | OAM | · | 2.2 km | MPC · JPL |
| 321651 | 2010 BY_{9} | — | February 14, 2002 | Kitt Peak | Spacewatch | L4 · ERY | 8.6 km | MPC · JPL |
| 321652 | 2010 BV_{47} | — | March 9, 2002 | Kitt Peak | Spacewatch | L4 | 14 km | MPC · JPL |
| 321653 | 2010 BP_{59} | — | October 27, 2009 | Mount Lemmon | Mount Lemmon Survey | L4 | 8.7 km | MPC · JPL |
| 321654 | 2010 BE_{60} | — | January 21, 2010 | WISE | WISE | · | 2.6 km | MPC · JPL |
| 321655 | 2010 BQ_{70} | — | January 22, 2010 | WISE | WISE | · | 5.5 km | MPC · JPL |
| 321656 | 2010 BM_{90} | — | October 2, 2009 | Mount Lemmon | Mount Lemmon Survey | L4 | 10 km | MPC · JPL |
| 321657 | 2010 BM_{117} | — | April 10, 2002 | Palomar | NEAT | L4 | 16 km | MPC · JPL |
| 321658 | 2010 CG_{12} | — | February 12, 2010 | Mayhill | Lowe, A. | · | 4.7 km | MPC · JPL |
| 321659 | 2010 CS_{20} | — | February 9, 2010 | Kitt Peak | Spacewatch | · | 2.1 km | MPC · JPL |
| 321660 | 2010 CN_{22} | — | February 9, 2010 | Kitt Peak | Spacewatch | · | 2.0 km | MPC · JPL |
| 321661 | 2010 CC_{40} | — | August 24, 2000 | Socorro | LINEAR | · | 1.5 km | MPC · JPL |
| 321662 | 2010 CJ_{57} | — | February 14, 2010 | Socorro | LINEAR | · | 3.5 km | MPC · JPL |
| 321663 | 2010 CP_{60} | — | February 14, 2010 | Socorro | LINEAR | · | 3.1 km | MPC · JPL |
| 321664 | 2010 CX_{74} | — | February 13, 2010 | Mount Lemmon | Mount Lemmon Survey | · | 2.5 km | MPC · JPL |
| 321665 | 2010 CT_{77} | — | February 13, 2010 | Mount Lemmon | Mount Lemmon Survey | THM | 2.5 km | MPC · JPL |
| 321666 | 2010 CG_{79} | — | February 13, 2010 | Mount Lemmon | Mount Lemmon Survey | · | 2.5 km | MPC · JPL |
| 321667 | 2010 CB_{81} | — | February 13, 2010 | Mount Lemmon | Mount Lemmon Survey | · | 1.2 km | MPC · JPL |
| 321668 | 2010 CH_{94} | — | February 14, 2010 | Kitt Peak | Spacewatch | · | 840 m | MPC · JPL |
| 321669 | 2010 CJ_{106} | — | August 28, 2000 | Socorro | LINEAR | · | 1.7 km | MPC · JPL |
| 321670 | 2010 CZ_{137} | — | February 9, 2010 | Kitt Peak | Spacewatch | · | 2.7 km | MPC · JPL |
| 321671 | 2010 CF_{162} | — | February 9, 2010 | Kitt Peak | Spacewatch | · | 2.8 km | MPC · JPL |
| 321672 | 2010 CC_{165} | — | June 17, 2006 | Kitt Peak | Spacewatch | (159) | 2.8 km | MPC · JPL |
| 321673 Huber | 2010 CO_{182} | Huber | February 16, 2010 | Mount Lemmon | Mount Lemmon Survey | · | 2.7 km | MPC · JPL |
| 321674 | 2010 CU_{240} | — | September 22, 2008 | Catalina | CSS | L4 | 11 km | MPC · JPL |
| 321675 | 2010 DF_{12} | — | December 29, 2000 | Kitt Peak | Spacewatch | EUN | 2.2 km | MPC · JPL |
| 321676 | 2010 DN_{30} | — | August 27, 2006 | Kitt Peak | Spacewatch | L4 | 13 km | MPC · JPL |
| 321677 | 2010 DS_{40} | — | February 16, 2010 | Mount Lemmon | Mount Lemmon Survey | · | 3.3 km | MPC · JPL |
| 321678 | 2010 DY_{42} | — | June 27, 2004 | Kitt Peak | Spacewatch | 3:2 | 6.3 km | MPC · JPL |
| 321679 | 2010 DB_{46} | — | February 17, 2010 | Kitt Peak | Spacewatch | NYS · | 1.8 km | MPC · JPL |
| 321680 | 2010 DF_{76} | — | February 19, 2010 | Kitt Peak | Spacewatch | · | 1.7 km | MPC · JPL |
| 321681 | 2010 EE_{41} | — | March 4, 2010 | Kitt Peak | Spacewatch | · | 1.5 km | MPC · JPL |
| 321682 | 2010 EV_{43} | — | September 15, 1998 | Kitt Peak | Spacewatch | · | 720 m | MPC · JPL |
| 321683 | 2010 EY_{75} | — | March 12, 2010 | Kitt Peak | Spacewatch | (21885) | 4.6 km | MPC · JPL |
| 321684 | 2010 EF_{84} | — | July 24, 1995 | Kitt Peak | Spacewatch | · | 3.4 km | MPC · JPL |
| 321685 | 2010 EN_{99} | — | September 15, 2007 | Kitt Peak | Spacewatch | · | 2.3 km | MPC · JPL |
| 321686 | 2010 EP_{102} | — | March 15, 2010 | Kitt Peak | Spacewatch | · | 1.6 km | MPC · JPL |
| 321687 | 2010 EX_{103} | — | March 15, 2010 | Mount Lemmon | Mount Lemmon Survey | · | 2.5 km | MPC · JPL |
| 321688 | 2010 EM_{104} | — | March 12, 2010 | Catalina | CSS | · | 1.1 km | MPC · JPL |
| 321689 | 2010 EF_{107} | — | March 12, 2010 | Kitt Peak | Spacewatch | · | 1.6 km | MPC · JPL |
| 321690 | 2010 EG_{108} | — | March 13, 2010 | Kitt Peak | Spacewatch | · | 2.9 km | MPC · JPL |
| 321691 | 2010 EW_{108} | — | March 14, 2010 | Kitt Peak | Spacewatch | AGN | 1.7 km | MPC · JPL |
| 321692 | 2010 EV_{110} | — | March 12, 2010 | Mount Lemmon | Mount Lemmon Survey | · | 3.0 km | MPC · JPL |
| 321693 | 2010 EY_{119} | — | March 13, 2010 | Kitt Peak | Spacewatch | · | 2.9 km | MPC · JPL |
| 321694 | 2010 EB_{121} | — | March 13, 2010 | Kitt Peak | Spacewatch | · | 1.9 km | MPC · JPL |
| 321695 | 2010 EQ_{123} | — | March 4, 2010 | Kitt Peak | Spacewatch | · | 2.9 km | MPC · JPL |
| 321696 | 2010 EA_{126} | — | March 13, 2010 | Catalina | CSS | TIR | 2.9 km | MPC · JPL |
| 321697 | 2010 EV_{136} | — | March 12, 2010 | Mount Lemmon | Mount Lemmon Survey | · | 3.3 km | MPC · JPL |
| 321698 | 2010 EZ_{136} | — | March 13, 2010 | Kitt Peak | Spacewatch | · | 2.2 km | MPC · JPL |
| 321699 | 2010 EO_{140} | — | March 10, 2010 | La Sagra | OAM | · | 2.9 km | MPC · JPL |
| 321700 | 2010 FO_{1} | — | September 13, 2007 | Anderson Mesa | LONEOS | · | 5.0 km | MPC · JPL |

== 321701–321800 ==
back to top

| Designation | | | Discovery | | | Properties | | Ref |
| Permanent | Provisional | Named after | Date | Site | Discoverer(s) | Category | Diam. | Ref |
|---|---|---|---|---|---|---|---|---|
| 321701 | 2010 FV_{10} | — | March 16, 2010 | Kitt Peak | Spacewatch | PAD | 3.0 km | MPC · JPL |
| 321702 | 2010 FX_{21} | — | March 18, 2010 | Mount Lemmon | Mount Lemmon Survey | · | 2.0 km | MPC · JPL |
| 321703 | 2010 FY_{90} | — | March 21, 2010 | Mount Lemmon | Mount Lemmon Survey | · | 1.6 km | MPC · JPL |
| 321704 | 2010 FP_{96} | — | April 5, 2000 | Kitt Peak | Spacewatch | KOR | 1.6 km | MPC · JPL |
| 321705 | 2010 FL_{100} | — | February 25, 2006 | Mount Lemmon | Mount Lemmon Survey | · | 2.0 km | MPC · JPL |
| 321706 | 2010 GA_{3} | — | November 1, 2005 | Kitt Peak | Spacewatch | L5 | 20 km | MPC · JPL |
| 321707 | 2010 GZ_{31} | — | April 6, 2010 | Kitt Peak | Spacewatch | · | 780 m | MPC · JPL |
| 321708 | 2010 GC_{98} | — | April 10, 2010 | Kitt Peak | Spacewatch | (8737) | 4.6 km | MPC · JPL |
| 321709 | 2010 GR_{113} | — | April 10, 2010 | Kitt Peak | Spacewatch | HOF | 2.8 km | MPC · JPL |
| 321710 | 2010 GD_{117} | — | April 10, 2010 | Mount Lemmon | Mount Lemmon Survey | MAS | 920 m | MPC · JPL |
| 321711 | 2010 GF_{122} | — | March 15, 2010 | Catalina | CSS | · | 1.9 km | MPC · JPL |
| 321712 | 2010 GN_{124} | — | February 2, 2009 | Mount Lemmon | Mount Lemmon Survey | · | 2.2 km | MPC · JPL |
| 321713 | 2010 GM_{133} | — | April 11, 2010 | Kitt Peak | Spacewatch | HYG | 5.1 km | MPC · JPL |
| 321714 | 2010 GZ_{139} | — | April 7, 2010 | Mount Lemmon | Mount Lemmon Survey | · | 2.5 km | MPC · JPL |
| 321715 | 2010 GY_{144} | — | January 26, 2006 | Kitt Peak | Spacewatch | V | 670 m | MPC · JPL |
| 321716 | 2010 HX_{21} | — | February 14, 2005 | Kitt Peak | Spacewatch | L5 | 12 km | MPC · JPL |
| 321717 | 2010 HT_{77} | — | December 18, 2004 | Mount Lemmon | Mount Lemmon Survey | · | 1.5 km | MPC · JPL |
| 321718 | 2010 HU_{86} | — | April 28, 2010 | WISE | WISE | · | 3.1 km | MPC · JPL |
| 321719 | 2010 JG_{84} | — | October 11, 2001 | Socorro | LINEAR | · | 3.5 km | MPC · JPL |
| 321720 | 2010 JA_{118} | — | May 8, 2010 | Mount Lemmon | Mount Lemmon Survey | · | 1.4 km | MPC · JPL |
| 321721 | 2010 JN_{147} | — | May 9, 2010 | Mount Lemmon | Mount Lemmon Survey | · | 3.6 km | MPC · JPL |
| 321722 | 2010 JH_{174} | — | January 29, 2009 | Mount Lemmon | Mount Lemmon Survey | · | 3.8 km | MPC · JPL |
| 321723 | 2010 KY_{44} | — | May 20, 2010 | WISE | WISE | · | 5.2 km | MPC · JPL |
| 321724 | 2010 KM_{45} | — | May 21, 2010 | WISE | WISE | · | 2.7 km | MPC · JPL |
| 321725 | 2010 KP_{47} | — | May 21, 2010 | WISE | WISE | · | 2.1 km | MPC · JPL |
| 321726 | 2010 KJ_{50} | — | May 22, 2010 | WISE | WISE | · | 2.2 km | MPC · JPL |
| 321727 | 2010 KN_{93} | — | May 27, 2010 | WISE | WISE | NYS · | 1.8 km | MPC · JPL |
| 321728 | 2010 KE_{127} | — | April 2, 1997 | Kitt Peak | Spacewatch | · | 830 m | MPC · JPL |
| 321729 | 2010 LJ_{1} | — | June 2, 2010 | Nogales | M. Schwartz, P. R. Holvorcem | V | 930 m | MPC · JPL |
| 321730 | 2010 LQ_{4} | — | June 1, 2010 | WISE | WISE | · | 3.8 km | MPC · JPL |
| 321731 | 2010 LQ_{50} | — | June 8, 2010 | WISE | WISE | · | 2.8 km | MPC · JPL |
| 321732 | 2010 LY_{55} | — | November 22, 2003 | Catalina | CSS | PHO | 2.8 km | MPC · JPL |
| 321733 | 2010 LR_{61} | — | February 4, 2003 | Anderson Mesa | LONEOS | EOS | 3.3 km | MPC · JPL |
| 321734 | 2010 LC_{81} | — | June 11, 2010 | WISE | WISE | · | 1.8 km | MPC · JPL |
| 321735 | 2010 LC_{99} | — | December 21, 2005 | Siding Spring | SSS | T_{j} (2.98) · EUP | 4.5 km | MPC · JPL |
| 321736 | 2010 LM_{134} | — | June 13, 2010 | Mount Lemmon | Mount Lemmon Survey | V | 1.1 km | MPC · JPL |
| 321737 | 2010 ML_{23} | — | June 18, 2010 | WISE | WISE | · | 1.4 km | MPC · JPL |
| 321738 | 2010 MB_{34} | — | February 9, 2008 | Kitt Peak | Spacewatch | · | 2.5 km | MPC · JPL |
| 321739 | 2010 MK_{39} | — | June 22, 2010 | WISE | WISE | · | 2.8 km | MPC · JPL |
| 321740 | 2010 MN_{43} | — | October 1, 2005 | Mount Lemmon | Mount Lemmon Survey | · | 3.7 km | MPC · JPL |
| 321741 | 2010 MW_{53} | — | June 16, 2010 | WISE | WISE | · | 1.9 km | MPC · JPL |
| 321742 | 2010 MH_{55} | — | June 16, 2010 | WISE | WISE | BAR | 1.9 km | MPC · JPL |
| 321743 | 2010 MA_{67} | — | June 25, 2010 | WISE | WISE | · | 3.4 km | MPC · JPL |
| 321744 | 2010 MM_{70} | — | June 25, 2010 | WISE | WISE | · | 2.7 km | MPC · JPL |
| 321745 | 2010 MG_{89} | — | January 10, 2003 | Socorro | LINEAR | · | 2.8 km | MPC · JPL |
| 321746 | 2010 MW_{105} | — | June 30, 2010 | WISE | WISE | DOR | 3.2 km | MPC · JPL |
| 321747 | 2010 MW_{106} | — | June 30, 2010 | WISE | WISE | · | 3.1 km | MPC · JPL |
| 321748 | 2010 NU_{3} | — | July 4, 2010 | Kitt Peak | Spacewatch | · | 740 m | MPC · JPL |
| 321749 | 2010 NB_{7} | — | July 25, 2003 | Palomar | NEAT | · | 1.1 km | MPC · JPL |
| 321750 | 2010 NE_{18} | — | April 28, 2004 | Kitt Peak | Spacewatch | · | 3.1 km | MPC · JPL |
| 321751 | 2010 NM_{18} | — | March 21, 1999 | Apache Point | SDSS | · | 2.9 km | MPC · JPL |
| 321752 | 2010 NK_{19} | — | December 15, 2006 | Socorro | LINEAR | EUN · | 2.4 km | MPC · JPL |
| 321753 | 2010 NY_{32} | — | November 18, 2001 | Kitt Peak | Spacewatch | AST | 3.4 km | MPC · JPL |
| 321754 | 2010 NS_{38} | — | July 8, 2010 | WISE | WISE | · | 3.5 km | MPC · JPL |
| 321755 | 2010 NY_{81} | — | July 7, 2010 | Mount Lemmon | Mount Lemmon Survey | · | 1.3 km | MPC · JPL |
| 321756 | 2010 NK_{85} | — | July 1, 2010 | WISE | WISE | EOS · | 4.9 km | MPC · JPL |
| 321757 | 2010 NZ_{97} | — | November 2, 2006 | Mount Lemmon | Mount Lemmon Survey | · | 2.6 km | MPC · JPL |
| 321758 | 2010 NT_{101} | — | September 5, 2000 | Socorro | LINEAR | · | 1.2 km | MPC · JPL |
| 321759 | 2010 NZ_{102} | — | July 12, 2010 | WISE | WISE | · | 3.1 km | MPC · JPL |
| 321760 | 2010 NY_{103} | — | July 12, 2010 | WISE | WISE | · | 2.6 km | MPC · JPL |
| 321761 | 2010 NG_{108} | — | October 18, 2001 | Kitt Peak | Spacewatch | · | 2.1 km | MPC · JPL |
| 321762 | 2010 NO_{109} | — | July 13, 2010 | WISE | WISE | · | 3.6 km | MPC · JPL |
| 321763 | 2010 NR_{116} | — | September 16, 2004 | Siding Spring | SSS | VER | 5.9 km | MPC · JPL |
| 321764 | 2010 OL_{10} | — | July 16, 2010 | WISE | WISE | · | 3.4 km | MPC · JPL |
| 321765 | 2010 OE_{19} | — | November 29, 2005 | Catalina | CSS | · | 3.0 km | MPC · JPL |
| 321766 | 2010 OR_{19} | — | May 15, 2009 | Kitt Peak | Spacewatch | · | 1.8 km | MPC · JPL |
| 321767 | 2010 OS_{19} | — | July 18, 2010 | WISE | WISE | · | 2.6 km | MPC · JPL |
| 321768 | 2010 OM_{30} | — | October 30, 2005 | Mount Lemmon | Mount Lemmon Survey | · | 4.4 km | MPC · JPL |
| 321769 | 2010 OR_{30} | — | July 26, 1996 | Haleakala | AMOS | · | 1.6 km | MPC · JPL |
| 321770 | 2010 OJ_{32} | — | July 20, 2010 | WISE | WISE | · | 2.0 km | MPC · JPL |
| 321771 | 2010 OC_{47} | — | October 4, 2002 | Socorro | LINEAR | 3:2 | 7.1 km | MPC · JPL |
| 321772 | 2010 OF_{53} | — | December 14, 2006 | Kitt Peak | Spacewatch | PAD | 2.2 km | MPC · JPL |
| 321773 | 2010 OG_{56} | — | August 30, 2005 | Kitt Peak | Spacewatch | · | 2.7 km | MPC · JPL |
| 321774 | 2010 OM_{61} | — | August 27, 2005 | Anderson Mesa | LONEOS | · | 3.4 km | MPC · JPL |
| 321775 | 2010 OZ_{74} | — | March 18, 2007 | Kitt Peak | Spacewatch | · | 3.1 km | MPC · JPL |
| 321776 | 2010 OA_{78} | — | July 25, 2010 | WISE | WISE | · | 3.3 km | MPC · JPL |
| 321777 | 2010 OT_{79} | — | July 26, 2010 | WISE | WISE | · | 4.0 km | MPC · JPL |
| 321778 | 2010 OQ_{81} | — | December 22, 2000 | Kitt Peak | Spacewatch | · | 3.2 km | MPC · JPL |
| 321779 | 2010 OT_{82} | — | July 26, 2010 | WISE | WISE | · | 4.3 km | MPC · JPL |
| 321780 | 2010 OM_{84} | — | July 26, 2010 | WISE | WISE | · | 3.3 km | MPC · JPL |
| 321781 | 2010 ON_{84} | — | May 7, 2005 | Kitt Peak | Spacewatch | · | 1.7 km | MPC · JPL |
| 321782 | 2010 OQ_{86} | — | July 27, 2010 | WISE | WISE | · | 4.1 km | MPC · JPL |
| 321783 | 2010 OR_{91} | — | April 4, 2008 | Kitt Peak | Spacewatch | · | 3.2 km | MPC · JPL |
| 321784 | 2010 OH_{96} | — | December 11, 2006 | Kitt Peak | Spacewatch | · | 2.3 km | MPC · JPL |
| 321785 | 2010 OJ_{97} | — | November 13, 2006 | Catalina | CSS | · | 2.3 km | MPC · JPL |
| 321786 | 2010 OZ_{97} | — | March 21, 1999 | Apache Point | SDSS | · | 3.9 km | MPC · JPL |
| 321787 | 2010 ON_{98} | — | March 29, 2008 | Kitt Peak | Spacewatch | · | 3.2 km | MPC · JPL |
| 321788 | 2010 OW_{105} | — | July 29, 2010 | WISE | WISE | · | 4.0 km | MPC · JPL |
| 321789 | 2010 OT_{106} | — | October 19, 2006 | Catalina | CSS | · | 2.2 km | MPC · JPL |
| 321790 | 2010 OT_{122} | — | August 31, 2005 | Kitt Peak | Spacewatch | · | 2.8 km | MPC · JPL |
| 321791 | 2010 OK_{125} | — | January 27, 2007 | Mount Lemmon | Mount Lemmon Survey | · | 2.6 km | MPC · JPL |
| 321792 | 2010 PS_{1} | — | January 11, 2008 | Mount Lemmon | Mount Lemmon Survey | · | 1.8 km | MPC · JPL |
| 321793 | 2010 PZ_{23} | — | December 6, 2008 | Mount Lemmon | Mount Lemmon Survey | H | 780 m | MPC · JPL |
| 321794 | 2010 PW_{32} | — | September 9, 2004 | Socorro | LINEAR | · | 4.9 km | MPC · JPL |
| 321795 | 2010 PN_{51} | — | June 10, 2005 | Kitt Peak | Spacewatch | (5) | 1.5 km | MPC · JPL |
| 321796 | 2010 PO_{54} | — | February 14, 2004 | Palomar | NEAT | · | 3.4 km | MPC · JPL |
| 321797 | 2010 PA_{58} | — | September 30, 2005 | Kitt Peak | Spacewatch | · | 1.9 km | MPC · JPL |
| 321798 | 2010 PY_{60} | — | August 10, 2010 | Kitt Peak | Spacewatch | · | 1.8 km | MPC · JPL |
| 321799 | 2010 PA_{61} | — | January 13, 1996 | Kitt Peak | Spacewatch | · | 1.1 km | MPC · JPL |
| 321800 | 2010 PG_{62} | — | August 10, 2010 | Kitt Peak | Spacewatch | · | 1.3 km | MPC · JPL |

== 321801–321900 ==
back to top

| Designation | | | Discovery | | | Properties | | Ref |
| Permanent | Provisional | Named after | Date | Site | Discoverer(s) | Category | Diam. | Ref |
|---|---|---|---|---|---|---|---|---|
| 321801 | 2010 PA_{67} | — | February 13, 2008 | Catalina | CSS | EUN | 2.0 km | MPC · JPL |
| 321802 Malaspina | 2010 PA_{71} | Malaspina | September 15, 1977 | Palomar | Colombini, E. | · | 5.2 km | MPC · JPL |
| 321803 | 2010 PZ_{71} | — | March 16, 2007 | Mount Lemmon | Mount Lemmon Survey | · | 3.4 km | MPC · JPL |
| 321804 | 2010 PM_{72} | — | November 6, 1999 | Catalina | CSS | · | 4.7 km | MPC · JPL |
| 321805 | 2010 PX_{72} | — | November 9, 1999 | Socorro | LINEAR | T_{j} (2.99) | 4.8 km | MPC · JPL |
| 321806 | 2010 PA_{76} | — | August 10, 2010 | Kitt Peak | Spacewatch | · | 740 m | MPC · JPL |
| 321807 | 2010 PG_{80} | — | August 13, 2010 | Kitt Peak | Spacewatch | · | 940 m | MPC · JPL |
| 321808 | 2010 RN_{3} | — | September 1, 2010 | Socorro | LINEAR | H | 720 m | MPC · JPL |
| 321809 | 2010 RP_{3} | — | November 17, 2000 | Kitt Peak | Spacewatch | · | 690 m | MPC · JPL |
| 321810 | 2010 RK_{4} | — | September 1, 2010 | ESA OGS | ESA OGS | MRX | 910 m | MPC · JPL |
| 321811 | 2010 RJ_{9} | — | September 2, 2010 | Socorro | LINEAR | · | 1.6 km | MPC · JPL |
| 321812 | 2010 RH_{11} | — | September 2, 2010 | Mount Lemmon | Mount Lemmon Survey | · | 1.3 km | MPC · JPL |
| 321813 | 2010 RD_{14} | — | September 1, 2010 | Socorro | LINEAR | NYS | 1.5 km | MPC · JPL |
| 321814 | 2010 RP_{14} | — | September 1, 2010 | Socorro | LINEAR | · | 1.3 km | MPC · JPL |
| 321815 | 2010 RS_{14} | — | March 31, 2003 | Anderson Mesa | LONEOS | GAL | 2.2 km | MPC · JPL |
| 321816 | 2010 RF_{33} | — | September 1, 2010 | Socorro | LINEAR | · | 3.7 km | MPC · JPL |
| 321817 | 2010 RJ_{36} | — | September 2, 2010 | Mount Lemmon | Mount Lemmon Survey | · | 1.3 km | MPC · JPL |
| 321818 | 2010 RB_{38} | — | October 23, 2006 | Mount Lemmon | Mount Lemmon Survey | · | 1.7 km | MPC · JPL |
| 321819 | 2010 RZ_{43} | — | March 18, 2009 | Kitt Peak | Spacewatch | NYS | 1.3 km | MPC · JPL |
| 321820 | 2010 RH_{46} | — | August 20, 2001 | Cerro Tololo | Deep Ecliptic Survey | · | 1.3 km | MPC · JPL |
| 321821 | 2010 RT_{46} | — | September 1, 2005 | Palomar | NEAT | H | 730 m | MPC · JPL |
| 321822 | 2010 RW_{46} | — | October 31, 2006 | Mount Lemmon | Mount Lemmon Survey | · | 2.6 km | MPC · JPL |
| 321823 | 2010 RZ_{46} | — | October 8, 1996 | Kitt Peak | Spacewatch | AGN | 1.5 km | MPC · JPL |
| 321824 | 2010 RE_{47} | — | October 4, 2006 | Mount Lemmon | Mount Lemmon Survey | · | 1.3 km | MPC · JPL |
| 321825 | 2010 RZ_{49} | — | September 16, 2003 | Kitt Peak | Spacewatch | · | 1.0 km | MPC · JPL |
| 321826 | 2010 RO_{59} | — | May 26, 2006 | Mount Lemmon | Mount Lemmon Survey | · | 800 m | MPC · JPL |
| 321827 | 2010 RN_{60} | — | October 27, 2006 | Catalina | CSS | · | 2.2 km | MPC · JPL |
| 321828 | 2010 RA_{66} | — | September 4, 2010 | Kitt Peak | Spacewatch | · | 1.3 km | MPC · JPL |
| 321829 | 2010 RB_{66} | — | October 2, 2006 | Mount Lemmon | Mount Lemmon Survey | (5) | 1.4 km | MPC · JPL |
| 321830 | 2010 RU_{71} | — | September 22, 2003 | Palomar | NEAT | V | 710 m | MPC · JPL |
| 321831 | 2010 RX_{71} | — | March 26, 2008 | Mount Lemmon | Mount Lemmon Survey | · | 1.9 km | MPC · JPL |
| 321832 | 2010 RB_{75} | — | September 5, 2010 | Wildberg | R. Apitzsch | · | 1.3 km | MPC · JPL |
| 321833 | 2010 RZ_{77} | — | November 17, 2006 | Catalina | CSS | · | 1.9 km | MPC · JPL |
| 321834 | 2010 RK_{78} | — | January 19, 2004 | Kitt Peak | Spacewatch | MAS | 880 m | MPC · JPL |
| 321835 | 2010 RS_{96} | — | September 20, 2001 | Kitt Peak | Spacewatch | · | 1.7 km | MPC · JPL |
| 321836 | 2010 RD_{98} | — | September 18, 2003 | Kitt Peak | Spacewatch | PHO | 1.1 km | MPC · JPL |
| 321837 | 2010 RO_{102} | — | October 22, 2003 | Kitt Peak | Spacewatch | · | 1.2 km | MPC · JPL |
| 321838 | 2010 RY_{103} | — | March 11, 2005 | Mount Lemmon | Mount Lemmon Survey | · | 1.2 km | MPC · JPL |
| 321839 | 2010 RN_{104} | — | December 21, 2006 | Kitt Peak | Spacewatch | · | 1.8 km | MPC · JPL |
| 321840 | 2010 RX_{104} | — | March 4, 2008 | Kitt Peak | Spacewatch | · | 1.9 km | MPC · JPL |
| 321841 | 2010 RP_{105} | — | April 9, 2008 | Kitt Peak | Spacewatch | · | 1.9 km | MPC · JPL |
| 321842 | 2010 RT_{105} | — | September 7, 1999 | Kitt Peak | Spacewatch | · | 2.4 km | MPC · JPL |
| 321843 | 2010 RY_{107} | — | March 6, 2008 | Mount Lemmon | Mount Lemmon Survey | HNS | 1.1 km | MPC · JPL |
| 321844 | 2010 RG_{110} | — | November 1, 2005 | Catalina | CSS | · | 2.8 km | MPC · JPL |
| 321845 | 2010 RX_{111} | — | September 11, 2010 | Kitt Peak | Spacewatch | · | 910 m | MPC · JPL |
| 321846 | 2010 RD_{113} | — | September 11, 2010 | Kitt Peak | Spacewatch | · | 1.8 km | MPC · JPL |
| 321847 | 2010 RN_{113} | — | November 18, 2007 | Mount Lemmon | Mount Lemmon Survey | · | 800 m | MPC · JPL |
| 321848 | 2010 RP_{116} | — | February 11, 2004 | Kitt Peak | Spacewatch | · | 1.4 km | MPC · JPL |
| 321849 | 2010 RG_{118} | — | June 28, 2005 | Kitt Peak | Spacewatch | · | 2.0 km | MPC · JPL |
| 321850 | 2010 RZ_{123} | — | September 19, 2006 | Catalina | CSS | · | 2.0 km | MPC · JPL |
| 321851 | 2010 RH_{124} | — | September 14, 1996 | Kitt Peak | Spacewatch | · | 2.2 km | MPC · JPL |
| 321852 | 2010 RR_{124} | — | August 19, 2006 | Kitt Peak | Spacewatch | · | 1.4 km | MPC · JPL |
| 321853 | 2010 RE_{128} | — | April 5, 2002 | Palomar | NEAT | V | 860 m | MPC · JPL |
| 321854 | 2010 RD_{129} | — | September 15, 2010 | Kitt Peak | Spacewatch | · | 2.2 km | MPC · JPL |
| 321855 | 2010 RZ_{129} | — | September 13, 2010 | La Sagra | OAM | · | 1.3 km | MPC · JPL |
| 321856 | 2010 RW_{134} | — | September 15, 2010 | Kitt Peak | Spacewatch | (5) | 1.2 km | MPC · JPL |
| 321857 | 2010 RX_{136} | — | October 17, 2001 | Kitt Peak | Spacewatch | · | 2.5 km | MPC · JPL |
| 321858 | 2010 RV_{140} | — | September 15, 2006 | Kitt Peak | Spacewatch | PHO | 1.2 km | MPC · JPL |
| 321859 | 2010 RR_{143} | — | September 7, 2004 | Kitt Peak | Spacewatch | · | 2.7 km | MPC · JPL |
| 321860 | 2010 RQ_{145} | — | March 15, 2004 | Kitt Peak | Spacewatch | · | 1.5 km | MPC · JPL |
| 321861 | 2010 RC_{149} | — | December 22, 2003 | Kitt Peak | Spacewatch | · | 1.6 km | MPC · JPL |
| 321862 | 2010 RS_{154} | — | December 9, 2006 | Kitt Peak | Spacewatch | AGN | 1.5 km | MPC · JPL |
| 321863 | 2010 RG_{155} | — | October 22, 2006 | Catalina | CSS | · | 1.2 km | MPC · JPL |
| 321864 | 2010 RN_{155} | — | May 23, 2006 | Mount Lemmon | Mount Lemmon Survey | · | 1.3 km | MPC · JPL |
| 321865 | 2010 RB_{157} | — | February 9, 2005 | Mount Lemmon | Mount Lemmon Survey | V | 530 m | MPC · JPL |
| 321866 | 2010 RH_{160} | — | November 4, 1999 | Socorro | LINEAR | NYS | 1.3 km | MPC · JPL |
| 321867 | 2010 RV_{164} | — | July 8, 2003 | Kitt Peak | Spacewatch | · | 1.0 km | MPC · JPL |
| 321868 | 2010 RG_{165} | — | August 17, 2006 | Palomar | NEAT | NYS | 1.5 km | MPC · JPL |
| 321869 | 2010 RA_{166} | — | March 29, 2008 | Mount Lemmon | Mount Lemmon Survey | · | 1.7 km | MPC · JPL |
| 321870 | 2010 RN_{167} | — | July 31, 2005 | Palomar | NEAT | · | 2.3 km | MPC · JPL |
| 321871 | 2010 RD_{170} | — | November 10, 2005 | Catalina | CSS | · | 2.7 km | MPC · JPL |
| 321872 | 2010 RP_{175} | — | October 15, 2001 | Apache Point | SDSS | · | 1.7 km | MPC · JPL |
| 321873 | 2010 RA_{177} | — | August 13, 2006 | Palomar | NEAT | · | 1.2 km | MPC · JPL |
| 321874 | 2010 RC_{179} | — | June 19, 2006 | Mount Lemmon | Mount Lemmon Survey | · | 1.2 km | MPC · JPL |
| 321875 | 2010 SC_{5} | — | August 4, 2003 | Kitt Peak | Spacewatch | · | 790 m | MPC · JPL |
| 321876 | 2010 SG_{7} | — | February 23, 2001 | Cerro Tololo | Deep Lens Survey | NYS | 1.3 km | MPC · JPL |
| 321877 | 2010 SR_{11} | — | July 21, 2001 | Haleakala | NEAT | · | 1.7 km | MPC · JPL |
| 321878 | 2010 SN_{13} | — | October 28, 1997 | Kitt Peak | Spacewatch | · | 1.7 km | MPC · JPL |
| 321879 | 2010 SW_{13} | — | November 6, 2007 | Kitt Peak | Spacewatch | · | 990 m | MPC · JPL |
| 321880 | 2010 SS_{19} | — | October 2, 2006 | Mount Lemmon | Mount Lemmon Survey | EUN | 1.2 km | MPC · JPL |
| 321881 | 2010 SM_{23} | — | August 6, 2005 | Palomar | NEAT | AGN | 1.5 km | MPC · JPL |
| 321882 | 2010 SP_{26} | — | August 23, 2003 | Palomar | NEAT | · | 870 m | MPC · JPL |
| 321883 | 2010 SR_{26} | — | October 16, 1995 | Kitt Peak | Spacewatch | · | 1.2 km | MPC · JPL |
| 321884 | 2010 SZ_{26} | — | October 28, 1995 | Kitt Peak | Spacewatch | · | 2.1 km | MPC · JPL |
| 321885 | 2010 SG_{28} | — | March 18, 2001 | Socorro | LINEAR | · | 1.4 km | MPC · JPL |
| 321886 | 2010 SR_{28} | — | September 19, 2001 | Socorro | LINEAR | WIT | 920 m | MPC · JPL |
| 321887 | 2010 SL_{30} | — | February 27, 2009 | Mount Lemmon | Mount Lemmon Survey | · | 880 m | MPC · JPL |
| 321888 | 2010 SO_{32} | — | February 2, 2008 | Mount Lemmon | Mount Lemmon Survey | · | 1.0 km | MPC · JPL |
| 321889 | 2010 SJ_{35} | — | April 12, 2002 | Socorro | LINEAR | · | 3.8 km | MPC · JPL |
| 321890 | 2010 SH_{36} | — | December 13, 2006 | Catalina | CSS | · | 2.0 km | MPC · JPL |
| 321891 | 2010 SO_{36} | — | February 9, 2008 | Mount Lemmon | Mount Lemmon Survey | · | 1.9 km | MPC · JPL |
| 321892 | 2010 SO_{37} | — | September 9, 2004 | Kitt Peak | Spacewatch | · | 3.2 km | MPC · JPL |
| 321893 | 2010 SO_{39} | — | October 23, 2006 | Catalina | CSS | · | 2.5 km | MPC · JPL |
| 321894 | 2010 TB_{2} | — | March 11, 2008 | Kitt Peak | Spacewatch | · | 2.3 km | MPC · JPL |
| 321895 | 2010 TY_{3} | — | March 10, 2007 | Mount Lemmon | Mount Lemmon Survey | · | 2.6 km | MPC · JPL |
| 321896 | 2010 TM_{6} | — | August 31, 2003 | Kitt Peak | Spacewatch | · | 690 m | MPC · JPL |
| 321897 | 2010 TV_{6} | — | October 2, 2010 | Kitt Peak | Spacewatch | · | 1.7 km | MPC · JPL |
| 321898 | 2010 TW_{6} | — | October 19, 2003 | Kitt Peak | Spacewatch | NYS | 1.2 km | MPC · JPL |
| 321899 | 2010 TC_{7} | — | August 20, 2004 | Catalina | CSS | · | 4.4 km | MPC · JPL |
| 321900 | 2010 TR_{8} | — | August 27, 2006 | Kitt Peak | Spacewatch | NYS | 990 m | MPC · JPL |

== 321901–322000 ==
back to top

| Designation | | | Discovery | | | Properties | | Ref |
| Permanent | Provisional | Named after | Date | Site | Discoverer(s) | Category | Diam. | Ref |
|---|---|---|---|---|---|---|---|---|
| 321901 | 2010 TM_{9} | — | August 28, 2005 | Kitt Peak | Spacewatch | KOR | 1.5 km | MPC · JPL |
| 321902 | 2010 TE_{14} | — | May 27, 2009 | Mount Lemmon | Mount Lemmon Survey | V | 750 m | MPC · JPL |
| 321903 | 2010 TK_{15} | — | August 31, 2005 | Kitt Peak | Spacewatch | 615 | 1.3 km | MPC · JPL |
| 321904 | 2010 TF_{17} | — | June 18, 2006 | Kitt Peak | Spacewatch | · | 830 m | MPC · JPL |
| 321905 | 2010 TO_{22} | — | December 19, 2007 | Mount Lemmon | Mount Lemmon Survey | · | 1.3 km | MPC · JPL |
| 321906 | 2010 TD_{23} | — | January 13, 2002 | Kitt Peak | Spacewatch | · | 740 m | MPC · JPL |
| 321907 | 2010 TY_{23} | — | October 1, 2003 | Kitt Peak | Spacewatch | (2076) | 960 m | MPC · JPL |
| 321908 | 2010 TP_{24} | — | October 1, 2010 | Catalina | CSS | EOS | 2.3 km | MPC · JPL |
| 321909 | 2010 TS_{24} | — | July 21, 2006 | Catalina | CSS | · | 1.7 km | MPC · JPL |
| 321910 | 2010 TJ_{28} | — | October 13, 2006 | Kitt Peak | Spacewatch | · | 1.1 km | MPC · JPL |
| 321911 | 2010 TG_{33} | — | August 27, 2005 | Kitt Peak | Spacewatch | AGN | 1.2 km | MPC · JPL |
| 321912 | 2010 TU_{35} | — | March 20, 2007 | Anderson Mesa | LONEOS | EUP | 3.4 km | MPC · JPL |
| 321913 | 2010 TV_{37} | — | October 6, 1994 | Kitt Peak | Spacewatch | EOS | 2.3 km | MPC · JPL |
| 321914 | 2010 TF_{39} | — | December 26, 2005 | Kitt Peak | Spacewatch | · | 3.2 km | MPC · JPL |
| 321915 | 2010 TK_{41} | — | March 5, 2008 | Kitt Peak | Spacewatch | ADE | 1.9 km | MPC · JPL |
| 321916 | 2010 TA_{45} | — | April 4, 2005 | Kitt Peak | Spacewatch | · | 980 m | MPC · JPL |
| 321917 | 2010 TH_{45} | — | March 8, 2005 | Kitt Peak | Spacewatch | · | 1.1 km | MPC · JPL |
| 321918 | 2010 TW_{55} | — | April 3, 2005 | Palomar | NEAT | V | 1.1 km | MPC · JPL |
| 321919 | 2010 TQ_{58} | — | February 26, 2008 | Kitt Peak | Spacewatch | WIT | 1.1 km | MPC · JPL |
| 321920 | 2010 TY_{59} | — | April 12, 2002 | Kitt Peak | Spacewatch | NYS | 1.3 km | MPC · JPL |
| 321921 | 2010 TR_{72} | — | February 2, 1998 | Kitt Peak | Spacewatch | (18466) | 2.3 km | MPC · JPL |
| 321922 | 2010 TS_{76} | — | October 5, 2000 | Kitt Peak | Spacewatch | · | 1.1 km | MPC · JPL |
| 321923 | 2010 TO_{79} | — | March 3, 2005 | Kitt Peak | Spacewatch | · | 860 m | MPC · JPL |
| 321924 | 2010 TR_{80} | — | January 5, 2003 | Socorro | LINEAR | (5) | 1.9 km | MPC · JPL |
| 321925 | 2010 TW_{80} | — | August 13, 2006 | Palomar | NEAT | · | 1.3 km | MPC · JPL |
| 321926 | 2010 TA_{81} | — | November 9, 1999 | Socorro | LINEAR | · | 3.4 km | MPC · JPL |
| 321927 | 2010 TX_{81} | — | April 5, 2008 | Kitt Peak | Spacewatch | BRA | 1.7 km | MPC · JPL |
| 321928 | 2010 TA_{88} | — | March 16, 2009 | Kitt Peak | Spacewatch | · | 750 m | MPC · JPL |
| 321929 | 2010 TG_{91} | — | September 21, 2001 | Socorro | LINEAR | WIT | 1.0 km | MPC · JPL |
| 321930 | 2010 TL_{98} | — | October 30, 2005 | Kitt Peak | Spacewatch | · | 3.4 km | MPC · JPL |
| 321931 | 2010 TC_{99} | — | February 13, 2008 | Mount Lemmon | Mount Lemmon Survey | · | 2.0 km | MPC · JPL |
| 321932 | 2010 TQ_{99} | — | January 17, 2004 | Palomar | NEAT | · | 1.3 km | MPC · JPL |
| 321933 | 2010 TV_{99} | — | September 30, 2006 | Mount Lemmon | Mount Lemmon Survey | · | 1.5 km | MPC · JPL |
| 321934 | 2010 TW_{108} | — | January 23, 1998 | Kitt Peak | Spacewatch | · | 750 m | MPC · JPL |
| 321935 | 2010 TM_{111} | — | September 6, 2010 | Kitt Peak | Spacewatch | KOR | 1.5 km | MPC · JPL |
| 321936 | 2010 TP_{117} | — | October 18, 2006 | Kitt Peak | Spacewatch | · | 1.3 km | MPC · JPL |
| 321937 | 2010 TQ_{118} | — | April 1, 2008 | Kitt Peak | Spacewatch | GEF | 1.2 km | MPC · JPL |
| 321938 | 2010 TQ_{124} | — | September 19, 2003 | Palomar | NEAT | · | 920 m | MPC · JPL |
| 321939 | 2010 TR_{129} | — | November 26, 2003 | Kitt Peak | Spacewatch | V | 740 m | MPC · JPL |
| 321940 | 2010 TT_{129} | — | October 20, 1993 | La Silla | E. W. Elst | · | 1.7 km | MPC · JPL |
| 321941 | 2010 TX_{129} | — | August 17, 2001 | Palomar | NEAT | · | 1.8 km | MPC · JPL |
| 321942 | 2010 TJ_{138} | — | December 12, 2006 | Mount Lemmon | Mount Lemmon Survey | HOF | 2.6 km | MPC · JPL |
| 321943 | 2010 TO_{142} | — | November 16, 2006 | Mount Lemmon | Mount Lemmon Survey | · | 2.3 km | MPC · JPL |
| 321944 | 2010 TF_{151} | — | January 28, 2007 | Mount Lemmon | Mount Lemmon Survey | · | 1.7 km | MPC · JPL |
| 321945 | 2010 TC_{162} | — | March 11, 2007 | Mount Lemmon | Mount Lemmon Survey | · | 4.9 km | MPC · JPL |
| 321946 | 2010 TD_{162} | — | December 4, 2005 | Kitt Peak | Spacewatch | · | 3.5 km | MPC · JPL |
| 321947 | 2010 TQ_{163} | — | November 25, 2006 | Mount Lemmon | Mount Lemmon Survey | · | 2.1 km | MPC · JPL |
| 321948 | 2010 TZ_{166} | — | August 1, 2000 | Socorro | LINEAR | · | 690 m | MPC · JPL |
| 321949 | 2010 TT_{167} | — | December 19, 2007 | Mount Lemmon | Mount Lemmon Survey | V | 740 m | MPC · JPL |
| 321950 | 2010 TJ_{170} | — | November 17, 2007 | Kitt Peak | Spacewatch | · | 960 m | MPC · JPL |
| 321951 | 2010 TD_{175} | — | October 19, 2003 | Palomar | NEAT | · | 1.3 km | MPC · JPL |
| 321952 | 2010 TP_{180} | — | April 1, 2009 | Mount Lemmon | Mount Lemmon Survey | · | 810 m | MPC · JPL |
| 321953 | 2010 TZ_{180} | — | October 23, 2003 | Kitt Peak | Spacewatch | V | 840 m | MPC · JPL |
| 321954 | 2010 UR_{5} | — | February 1, 2008 | Kitt Peak | Spacewatch | · | 2.1 km | MPC · JPL |
| 321955 | 2010 UR_{6} | — | March 13, 2002 | Socorro | LINEAR | EOS | 2.2 km | MPC · JPL |
| 321956 | 2010 UA_{11} | — | November 13, 2006 | Kitt Peak | Spacewatch | EUN | 1.7 km | MPC · JPL |
| 321957 | 2010 UM_{12} | — | October 2, 1997 | Caussols | ODAS | · | 1.7 km | MPC · JPL |
| 321958 | 2010 UO_{13} | — | March 9, 2003 | Kitt Peak | Spacewatch | · | 2.3 km | MPC · JPL |
| 321959 | 2010 UX_{13} | — | November 17, 2006 | Kitt Peak | Spacewatch | · | 1.6 km | MPC · JPL |
| 321960 | 2010 UB_{15} | — | February 20, 2002 | Kitt Peak | Spacewatch | · | 900 m | MPC · JPL |
| 321961 | 2010 UH_{16} | — | February 26, 2009 | Mount Lemmon | Mount Lemmon Survey | · | 1.4 km | MPC · JPL |
| 321962 | 2010 UK_{16} | — | November 17, 2006 | Mount Lemmon | Mount Lemmon Survey | (5) | 1.5 km | MPC · JPL |
| 321963 | 2010 UH_{17} | — | May 8, 2008 | Mount Lemmon | Mount Lemmon Survey | VER | 3.7 km | MPC · JPL |
| 321964 | 2010 UD_{21} | — | February 18, 2001 | Haleakala | NEAT | · | 3.9 km | MPC · JPL |
| 321965 | 2010 UA_{23} | — | September 27, 1995 | Kitt Peak | Spacewatch | MAS | 950 m | MPC · JPL |
| 321966 | 2010 UD_{23} | — | October 17, 2001 | Kitt Peak | Spacewatch | · | 1.7 km | MPC · JPL |
| 321967 | 2010 UP_{27} | — | October 25, 2005 | Mount Lemmon | Mount Lemmon Survey | · | 2.0 km | MPC · JPL |
| 321968 | 2010 UL_{28} | — | March 19, 1996 | Kitt Peak | Spacewatch | · | 2.2 km | MPC · JPL |
| 321969 | 2010 UN_{28} | — | December 12, 2001 | La Palma | T. Grav, Hansen, M. W. | KOR | 1.5 km | MPC · JPL |
| 321970 | 2010 UZ_{28} | — | January 5, 2003 | Socorro | LINEAR | (5) | 1.7 km | MPC · JPL |
| 321971 | 2010 UR_{31} | — | July 21, 2006 | Mount Lemmon | Mount Lemmon Survey | MAS | 730 m | MPC · JPL |
| 321972 | 2010 UV_{31} | — | May 8, 2005 | Kitt Peak | Spacewatch | · | 1.2 km | MPC · JPL |
| 321973 | 2010 UA_{34} | — | August 29, 2005 | Kitt Peak | Spacewatch | PAD | 1.9 km | MPC · JPL |
| 321974 | 2010 UF_{34} | — | January 26, 2003 | Haleakala | NEAT | · | 2.9 km | MPC · JPL |
| 321975 | 2010 UC_{35} | — | January 9, 2007 | Mount Lemmon | Mount Lemmon Survey | · | 2.0 km | MPC · JPL |
| 321976 | 2010 UF_{38} | — | December 14, 2004 | Kitt Peak | Spacewatch | · | 810 m | MPC · JPL |
| 321977 | 2010 UO_{38} | — | April 22, 2004 | Kitt Peak | Spacewatch | HNS | 1.5 km | MPC · JPL |
| 321978 | 2010 UX_{40} | — | August 26, 2005 | Palomar | NEAT | · | 2.0 km | MPC · JPL |
| 321979 | 2010 UM_{45} | — | December 9, 2006 | Kitt Peak | Spacewatch | · | 2.0 km | MPC · JPL |
| 321980 | 2010 UC_{46} | — | July 30, 2005 | Palomar | NEAT | · | 1.7 km | MPC · JPL |
| 321981 | 2010 US_{53} | — | November 3, 2005 | Kitt Peak | Spacewatch | · | 2.9 km | MPC · JPL |
| 321982 | 2010 UC_{54} | — | December 21, 2006 | Kitt Peak | Spacewatch | · | 1.6 km | MPC · JPL |
| 321983 | 2010 US_{54} | — | December 5, 2005 | Socorro | LINEAR | · | 3.0 km | MPC · JPL |
| 321984 | 2010 UZ_{54} | — | July 22, 2003 | Haleakala | NEAT | CYB | 3.9 km | MPC · JPL |
| 321985 | 2010 UT_{55} | — | August 28, 1995 | Kitt Peak | Spacewatch | · | 1.5 km | MPC · JPL |
| 321986 | 2010 US_{58} | — | August 28, 1995 | Kitt Peak | Spacewatch | L4 | 9.2 km | MPC · JPL |
| 321987 | 2010 UT_{58} | — | September 4, 2010 | Kitt Peak | Spacewatch | L4 | 10 km | MPC · JPL |
| 321988 | 2010 UX_{59} | — | July 12, 2005 | Mount Lemmon | Mount Lemmon Survey | · | 1.3 km | MPC · JPL |
| 321989 | 2010 UB_{61} | — | March 15, 2007 | Kitt Peak | Spacewatch | HYG | 4.4 km | MPC · JPL |
| 321990 | 2010 UE_{63} | — | September 11, 2004 | Socorro | LINEAR | · | 4.2 km | MPC · JPL |
| 321991 | 2010 UM_{63} | — | October 7, 2004 | Kitt Peak | Spacewatch | · | 3.0 km | MPC · JPL |
| 321992 | 2010 UY_{65} | — | June 21, 2006 | Kitt Peak | Spacewatch | · | 830 m | MPC · JPL |
| 321993 | 2010 UG_{72} | — | October 15, 2001 | Palomar | NEAT | · | 2.7 km | MPC · JPL |
| 321994 | 2010 UY_{74} | — | December 13, 2006 | Catalina | CSS | RAF | 1.4 km | MPC · JPL |
| 321995 | 2010 UQ_{75} | — | February 2, 2008 | Mount Lemmon | Mount Lemmon Survey | · | 1.4 km | MPC · JPL |
| 321996 | 2010 UY_{75} | — | August 29, 2005 | Palomar | NEAT | · | 2.6 km | MPC · JPL |
| 321997 | 2010 UW_{76} | — | April 29, 2003 | Kitt Peak | Spacewatch | · | 1.0 km | MPC · JPL |
| 321998 | 2010 UX_{77} | — | September 6, 1997 | Caussols | ODAS | · | 1.4 km | MPC · JPL |
| 321999 | 2010 UD_{78} | — | August 25, 2004 | Kitt Peak | Spacewatch | · | 4.4 km | MPC · JPL |
| 322000 | 2010 UL_{79} | — | February 13, 2008 | Mount Lemmon | Mount Lemmon Survey | · | 1.7 km | MPC · JPL |

back to top

== See also ==
- Meanings of minor-planet names: 321001–322000
