= List of minor planets: 334001–335000 =

The following is a partial list of minor planets, running from minor-planet number 334001 through 335000, inclusive. The primary data for this and other partial lists is based on JPL's "Small-Body Orbital Elements" and data available from the Minor Planet Center. Critical list information is also provided by the MPC, unless otherwise specified from Lowell Observatory. A detailed description of the table's columns and additional sources are given on the main page including a complete list of every page in this series, and a statistical break-up on the dynamical classification of minor planets.

Also see the summary list of all named bodies in numerical and alphabetical order, and the corresponding naming citations for the number range of this particular list. New namings may only be added to this list after official publication, as the preannouncement of names is condemned by the Working Group for Small Bodies Nomenclature of the International Astronomical Union.

Near-Earth obj.	MBA (inner)	MBA (outer)	Centaur
Mars-crosser	MBA (middle)	Jupiter trojan	Trans-Neptunian obj.
Unclassified

== 334001–334100 ==
Designation			Discovery			Properties		Ref
Permanent	Provisional	Named after	Date	Site	Discoverer(s)	Category	Diam.	Ref
334001	2000 TR_{50}	—	October 1, 2000	Socorro	LINEAR	·	1.8 km	MPC · JPL
334002	2000 UO_{14}	—	October 25, 2000	Socorro	LINEAR	(5)	1.4 km	MPC · JPL
334003	2000 UL_{17}	—	October 24, 2000	Socorro	LINEAR	(5)	1.0 km	MPC · JPL
334004	2000 UM_{38}	—	October 24, 2000	Socorro	LINEAR	·	1.0 km	MPC · JPL
334005	2000 UV_{44}	—	October 24, 2000	Socorro	LINEAR	(5)	1.7 km	MPC · JPL
334006	2000 UZ_{51}	—	October 24, 2000	Socorro	LINEAR	·	1.4 km	MPC · JPL
334007	2000 UB_{57}	—	October 25, 2000	Socorro	LINEAR	·	1.0 km	MPC · JPL
334008	2000 UP_{66}	—	October 25, 2000	Socorro	LINEAR	(5)	1.2 km	MPC · JPL
334009	2000 UK_{71}	—	October 25, 2000	Socorro	LINEAR	·	2.0 km	MPC · JPL
334010	2000 UV_{81}	—	October 25, 2000	Socorro	LINEAR	·	1.4 km	MPC · JPL
334011	2000 UL_{90}	—	October 24, 2000	Socorro	LINEAR	(5)	1.7 km	MPC · JPL
334012	2000 VF_{12}	—	November 1, 2000	Socorro	LINEAR	·	1.7 km	MPC · JPL
334013	2000 VL_{19}	—	November 1, 2000	Socorro	LINEAR	NYS	1.4 km	MPC · JPL
334014	2000 VD_{44}	—	November 1, 2000	Socorro	LINEAR	·	2.6 km	MPC · JPL
334015	2000 VV_{45}	—	November 2, 2000	Socorro	LINEAR	·	1.4 km	MPC · JPL
334016	2000 VC_{52}	—	November 3, 2000	Socorro	LINEAR	(5)	1.2 km	MPC · JPL
334017	2000 WP_{5}	—	November 19, 2000	Socorro	LINEAR	·	1.3 km	MPC · JPL
334018	2000 WB_{20}	—	November 23, 2000	Kitt Peak	Spacewatch	EUN	2.0 km	MPC · JPL
334019	2000 WV_{20}	—	November 25, 2000	Kitt Peak	Spacewatch	KON	2.7 km	MPC · JPL
334020	2000 WL_{45}	—	November 21, 2000	Socorro	LINEAR	·	1.7 km	MPC · JPL
334021	2000 WZ_{62}	—	November 18, 2000	Desert Beaver	W. K. Y. Yeung	·	1.6 km	MPC · JPL
334022	2000 WK_{94}	—	November 21, 2000	Socorro	LINEAR	·	1.5 km	MPC · JPL
334023	2000 WV_{115}	—	November 20, 2000	Socorro	LINEAR	·	1.6 km	MPC · JPL
334024	2000 WD_{137}	—	November 20, 2000	Anderson Mesa	LONEOS	·	1.9 km	MPC · JPL
334025	2000 WV_{195}	—	November 21, 2000	Socorro	LINEAR	JUN	1.3 km	MPC · JPL
334026	2000 XC_{1}	—	December 3, 2000	Haleakala	NEAT	·	1.3 km	MPC · JPL
334027	2000 XY_{17}	—	December 4, 2000	Socorro	LINEAR	EUN	1.9 km	MPC · JPL
334028	2000 XT_{37}	—	December 5, 2000	Socorro	LINEAR	·	760 m	MPC · JPL
334029	2000 XA_{39}	—	December 5, 2000	Socorro	LINEAR	·	3.2 km	MPC · JPL
334030	2000 XA_{47}	—	December 15, 2000	Socorro	LINEAR	PHO	1.4 km	MPC · JPL
334031	2000 YB_{28}	—	December 29, 2000	Haleakala	NEAT	·	1.2 km	MPC · JPL
334032	2000 YL_{108}	—	December 30, 2000	Socorro	LINEAR	·	3.0 km	MPC · JPL
334033	2000 YT_{113}	—	December 30, 2000	Socorro	LINEAR	JUN	1.2 km	MPC · JPL
334034	2000 YE_{140}	—	December 31, 2000	Anderson Mesa	LONEOS	·	2.2 km	MPC · JPL
334035	2001 AY_{22}	—	January 3, 2001	Socorro	LINEAR	MAR	2.0 km	MPC · JPL
334036	2001 AK_{33}	—	January 4, 2001	Socorro	LINEAR	EUN	2.2 km	MPC · JPL
334037	2001 BM_{76}	—	January 26, 2001	Socorro	LINEAR	·	2.6 km	MPC · JPL
334038	2001 CK_{20}	—	February 3, 2001	Socorro	LINEAR	·	1.7 km	MPC · JPL
334039	2001 CA_{46}	—	February 15, 2001	Socorro	LINEAR	PHO	1.5 km	MPC · JPL
334040	2001 DT_{25}	—	February 17, 2001	Socorro	LINEAR	·	2.6 km	MPC · JPL
334041	2001 DG_{41}	—	February 19, 2001	Socorro	LINEAR	·	1.4 km	MPC · JPL
334042	2001 EC_{18}	—	March 14, 2001	Anderson Mesa	LONEOS	·	660 m	MPC · JPL
334043	2001 FB_{24}	—	March 19, 2001	Socorro	LINEAR	·	1.0 km	MPC · JPL
334044	2001 FS_{116}	—	March 19, 2001	Haleakala	NEAT	·	4.2 km	MPC · JPL
334045	2001 KX_{17}	—	May 19, 2001	Bergisch Gladbach	W. Bickel	·	970 m	MPC · JPL
334046	2001 KY_{50}	—	May 26, 2001	Kitt Peak	Spacewatch	·	1.0 km	MPC · JPL
334047	2001 LR_{1}	—	June 13, 2001	Desert Beaver	W. K. Y. Yeung	·	2.9 km	MPC · JPL
334048	2001 LT_{16}	—	June 14, 2001	Palomar	NEAT	BRG	2.6 km	MPC · JPL
334049	2001 MX_{9}	—	June 23, 2001	Palomar	NEAT	·	2.9 km	MPC · JPL
334050	2001 NM_{1}	—	July 12, 2001	Palomar	NEAT	·	9.1 km	MPC · JPL
334051	2001 NA_{17}	—	July 14, 2001	Palomar	NEAT	·	1.2 km	MPC · JPL
334052	2001 OM_{4}	—	July 19, 2001	Palomar	NEAT	·	1.2 km	MPC · JPL
334053	2001 OY_{11}	—	July 19, 2001	Palomar	NEAT	·	6.8 km	MPC · JPL
334054	2001 OV_{15}	—	July 18, 2001	Palomar	NEAT	V	1.1 km	MPC · JPL
334055	2001 OK_{21}	—	July 21, 2001	Anderson Mesa	LONEOS	·	1.6 km	MPC · JPL
334056	2001 OU_{29}	—	July 18, 2001	Palomar	NEAT	EUP	3.7 km	MPC · JPL
334057	2001 OR_{47}	—	July 16, 2001	Anderson Mesa	LONEOS	·	1.9 km	MPC · JPL
334058	2001 OH_{59}	—	July 21, 2001	Haleakala	NEAT	PHO	1.5 km	MPC · JPL
334059	2001 OB_{75}	—	July 30, 2001	Palomar	NEAT	H	1.3 km	MPC · JPL
334060	2001 OR_{76}	—	July 22, 2001	Palomar	NEAT	·	1.5 km	MPC · JPL
334061	2001 OU_{91}	—	July 31, 2001	Palomar	NEAT	·	4.4 km	MPC · JPL
334062	2001 OS_{110}	—	July 27, 2001	Palomar	NEAT	·	4.7 km	MPC · JPL
334063	2001 PQ_{2}	—	August 3, 2001	Haleakala	NEAT	·	1.3 km	MPC · JPL
334064	2001 PD_{11}	—	August 9, 2001	Palomar	NEAT	NYS	1.2 km	MPC · JPL
334065	2001 PN_{12}	—	August 12, 2001	Palomar	NEAT	·	4.1 km	MPC · JPL
334066	2001 PO_{16}	—	August 9, 2001	Palomar	NEAT	·	4.8 km	MPC · JPL
334067	2001 PW_{16}	—	August 9, 2001	Palomar	NEAT	PHO	1.0 km	MPC · JPL
334068	2001 PP_{28}	—	August 13, 2001	San Marcello	A. Boattini, L. Tesi	·	4.0 km	MPC · JPL
334069	2001 PN_{33}	—	August 10, 2001	Palomar	NEAT	·	4.5 km	MPC · JPL
334070	2001 PG_{40}	—	August 11, 2001	Palomar	NEAT	EUP	7.5 km	MPC · JPL
334071	2001 PO_{48}	—	August 14, 2001	Palomar	NEAT	·	2.4 km	MPC · JPL
334072	2001 PL_{51}	—	August 15, 2001	Haleakala	NEAT	·	1.3 km	MPC · JPL
334073	2001 PL_{59}	—	August 14, 2001	Haleakala	NEAT	·	2.4 km	MPC · JPL
334074	2001 QO_{6}	—	August 16, 2001	Socorro	LINEAR	·	1.5 km	MPC · JPL
334075	2001 QF_{33}	—	August 17, 2001	Palomar	NEAT	V	800 m	MPC · JPL
334076	2001 QW_{33}	—	August 17, 2001	Ondřejov	P. Kušnirák, U. Babiaková	·	4.6 km	MPC · JPL
334077	2001 QN_{36}	—	August 16, 2001	Socorro	LINEAR	·	3.6 km	MPC · JPL
334078	2001 QY_{40}	—	July 16, 2001	Anderson Mesa	LONEOS	PHO	980 m	MPC · JPL
334079	2001 QM_{45}	—	August 16, 2001	Socorro	LINEAR	·	2.7 km	MPC · JPL
334080	2001 QW_{53}	—	August 16, 2001	Socorro	LINEAR	NYS	1.3 km	MPC · JPL
334081	2001 QJ_{59}	—	August 17, 2001	Socorro	LINEAR	PHO	1.3 km	MPC · JPL
334082	2001 QA_{90}	—	August 16, 2001	Palomar	NEAT	·	4.9 km	MPC · JPL
334083	2001 QB_{91}	—	August 22, 2001	Socorro	LINEAR	H	850 m	MPC · JPL
334084	2001 QO_{110}	—	August 20, 2001	Ondřejov	P. Kušnirák, P. Pravec	·	3.6 km	MPC · JPL
334085	2001 QO_{112}	—	August 25, 2001	Socorro	LINEAR	·	3.8 km	MPC · JPL
334086	2001 QM_{122}	—	August 19, 2001	Socorro	LINEAR	·	4.1 km	MPC · JPL
334087	2001 QD_{123}	—	August 19, 2001	Socorro	LINEAR	·	3.6 km	MPC · JPL
334088	2001 QW_{123}	—	August 19, 2001	Socorro	LINEAR	·	3.8 km	MPC · JPL
334089	2001 QT_{128}	—	August 20, 2001	Socorro	LINEAR	TIR	3.5 km	MPC · JPL
334090	2001 QS_{132}	—	August 20, 2001	Socorro	LINEAR	·	3.7 km	MPC · JPL
334091	2001 QK_{143}	—	August 21, 2001	Kitt Peak	Spacewatch	·	3.0 km	MPC · JPL
334092	2001 QT_{143}	—	August 21, 2001	Kitt Peak	Spacewatch	NYS	1.1 km	MPC · JPL
334093	2001 QP_{160}	—	August 23, 2001	Anderson Mesa	LONEOS	NYS	1.1 km	MPC · JPL
334094	2001 QU_{171}	—	August 25, 2001	Socorro	LINEAR	·	1.4 km	MPC · JPL
334095	2001 QS_{191}	—	August 22, 2001	Socorro	LINEAR	·	2.9 km	MPC · JPL
334096	2001 QR_{193}	—	August 22, 2001	Socorro	LINEAR	H	790 m	MPC · JPL
334097	2001 QH_{202}	—	August 23, 2001	Anderson Mesa	LONEOS	H	740 m	MPC · JPL
334098	2001 QR_{202}	—	August 23, 2001	Anderson Mesa	LONEOS	·	3.8 km	MPC · JPL
334099	2001 QQ_{203}	—	August 23, 2001	Anderson Mesa	LONEOS	·	1.3 km	MPC · JPL
334100	2001 QH_{206}	—	August 23, 2001	Anderson Mesa	LONEOS	V	920 m	MPC · JPL

== 334101–334200 ==
back to top

Designation			Discovery			Properties		Ref
Permanent	Provisional	Named after	Date	Site	Discoverer(s)	Category	Diam.	Ref
334101	2001 QC_{208}	—	August 23, 2001	Anderson Mesa	LONEOS	·	4.4 km	MPC · JPL
334102	2001 QW_{209}	—	August 23, 2001	Anderson Mesa	LONEOS	·	2.9 km	MPC · JPL
334103	2001 QY_{216}	—	August 23, 2001	Anderson Mesa	LONEOS	NYS	1.3 km	MPC · JPL
334104	2001 QF_{226}	—	August 24, 2001	Anderson Mesa	LONEOS	·	4.3 km	MPC · JPL
334105	2001 QJ_{227}	—	August 24, 2001	Anderson Mesa	LONEOS	·	3.3 km	MPC · JPL
334106	2001 QS_{227}	—	August 24, 2001	Anderson Mesa	LONEOS	·	1.5 km	MPC · JPL
334107	2001 QZ_{236}	—	August 24, 2001	Socorro	LINEAR	·	3.8 km	MPC · JPL
334108	2001 QH_{239}	—	August 24, 2001	Socorro	LINEAR	V	870 m	MPC · JPL
334109	2001 QC_{248}	—	August 24, 2001	Socorro	LINEAR	·	3.4 km	MPC · JPL
334110	2001 QE_{253}	—	August 25, 2001	Socorro	LINEAR	·	1.5 km	MPC · JPL
334111	2001 QH_{258}	—	August 25, 2001	Socorro	LINEAR	·	4.4 km	MPC · JPL
334112	2001 QD_{269}	—	August 20, 2001	Haleakala	NEAT	·	4.3 km	MPC · JPL
334113	2001 QP_{272}	—	August 19, 2001	Socorro	LINEAR	·	1.2 km	MPC · JPL
334114	2001 QG_{280}	—	August 19, 2001	Socorro	LINEAR	·	1.5 km	MPC · JPL
334115	2001 QA_{287}	—	August 17, 2001	Socorro	LINEAR	·	1.6 km	MPC · JPL
334116	2001 QT_{293}	—	August 22, 2001	Kiso	Ohba, Y.	·	1.2 km	MPC · JPL
334117	2001 QK_{295}	—	August 24, 2001	Socorro	LINEAR	PHO	1.4 km	MPC · JPL
334118	2001 QN_{328}	—	August 28, 2001	Palomar	NEAT	·	1.1 km	MPC · JPL
334119	2001 QL_{329}	—	August 23, 2001	Anderson Mesa	LONEOS	V	900 m	MPC · JPL
334120	2001 QT_{334}	—	August 29, 2001	Palomar	NEAT	·	1.7 km	MPC · JPL
334121	2001 RR_{2}	—	September 9, 2001	Goodricke-Pigott	R. A. Tucker	·	1.5 km	MPC · JPL
334122	2001 RH_{3}	—	September 8, 2001	Anderson Mesa	LONEOS	·	1.8 km	MPC · JPL
334123	2001 RV_{3}	—	September 7, 2001	Socorro	LINEAR	NYS	1.2 km	MPC · JPL
334124	2001 RJ_{9}	—	September 8, 2001	Socorro	LINEAR	EUP	8.4 km	MPC · JPL
334125	2001 RE_{15}	—	September 10, 2001	Socorro	LINEAR	·	4.1 km	MPC · JPL
334126	2001 RS_{27}	—	September 7, 2001	Socorro	LINEAR	TIR	3.2 km	MPC · JPL
334127	2001 RD_{32}	—	September 8, 2001	Socorro	LINEAR	·	7.3 km	MPC · JPL
334128	2001 RY_{35}	—	September 8, 2001	Socorro	LINEAR	·	3.4 km	MPC · JPL
334129	2001 RR_{36}	—	September 8, 2001	Socorro	LINEAR	·	3.1 km	MPC · JPL
334130	2001 RN_{39}	—	September 10, 2001	Socorro	LINEAR	EUN	1.2 km	MPC · JPL
334131	2001 RP_{39}	—	September 10, 2001	Socorro	LINEAR	H	510 m	MPC · JPL
334132	2001 RQ_{39}	—	September 10, 2001	Socorro	LINEAR	·	6.3 km	MPC · JPL
334133	2001 RS_{39}	—	September 10, 2001	Socorro	LINEAR	·	3.4 km	MPC · JPL
334134	2001 RX_{39}	—	September 10, 2001	Socorro	LINEAR	TIR	3.1 km	MPC · JPL
334135	2001 RM_{40}	—	September 11, 2001	Socorro	LINEAR	·	1.2 km	MPC · JPL
334136	2001 RC_{41}	—	September 11, 2001	Socorro	LINEAR	·	3.1 km	MPC · JPL
334137	2001 RF_{41}	—	September 11, 2001	Socorro	LINEAR	·	3.7 km	MPC · JPL
334138	2001 RE_{50}	—	September 10, 2001	Socorro	LINEAR	·	1.3 km	MPC · JPL
334139	2001 RN_{56}	—	September 12, 2001	Socorro	LINEAR	·	1.1 km	MPC · JPL
334140	2001 RM_{85}	—	September 11, 2001	Anderson Mesa	LONEOS	·	1.2 km	MPC · JPL
334141	2001 RS_{89}	—	September 11, 2001	Anderson Mesa	LONEOS	NYS	1.3 km	MPC · JPL
334142	2001 RP_{91}	—	September 11, 2001	Anderson Mesa	LONEOS	·	2.8 km	MPC · JPL
334143	2001 RB_{97}	—	September 12, 2001	Kitt Peak	Spacewatch	NYS	1.1 km	MPC · JPL
334144	2001 RJ_{100}	—	September 12, 2001	Socorro	LINEAR	·	1.7 km	MPC · JPL
334145	2001 RM_{117}	—	September 12, 2001	Socorro	LINEAR	·	2.3 km	MPC · JPL
334146	2001 RF_{122}	—	September 12, 2001	Socorro	LINEAR	NYS	1.3 km	MPC · JPL
334147	2001 RA_{124}	—	September 12, 2001	Socorro	LINEAR	NYS	1.3 km	MPC · JPL
334148	2001 RM_{125}	—	September 12, 2001	Socorro	LINEAR	·	3.3 km	MPC · JPL
334149	2001 RH_{128}	—	September 12, 2001	Socorro	LINEAR	·	1.6 km	MPC · JPL
334150	2001 RA_{129}	—	September 12, 2001	Socorro	LINEAR	V	920 m	MPC · JPL
334151	2001 RX_{137}	—	September 12, 2001	Socorro	LINEAR	·	3.2 km	MPC · JPL
334152	2001 RE_{141}	—	September 12, 2001	Socorro	LINEAR	·	4.3 km	MPC · JPL
334153	2001 RE_{147}	—	September 9, 2001	Anderson Mesa	LONEOS	PHO	1.1 km	MPC · JPL
334154	2001 RO_{150}	—	September 11, 2001	Anderson Mesa	LONEOS	EOS	2.6 km	MPC · JPL
334155	2001 RZ_{152}	—	September 11, 2001	Socorro	LINEAR	T_{j} (2.96)	4.9 km	MPC · JPL
334156	2001 ST_{7}	—	September 18, 2001	Kitt Peak	Spacewatch	·	2.7 km	MPC · JPL
334157	2001 SY_{7}	—	September 18, 2001	Kitt Peak	Spacewatch	·	1.2 km	MPC · JPL
334158	2001 SV_{11}	—	September 16, 2001	Socorro	LINEAR	V	690 m	MPC · JPL
334159	2001 SB_{18}	—	September 16, 2001	Socorro	LINEAR	·	1.5 km	MPC · JPL
334160	2001 SJ_{24}	—	September 16, 2001	Socorro	LINEAR	·	1.5 km	MPC · JPL
334161	2001 SD_{29}	—	September 16, 2001	Socorro	LINEAR	MAS	920 m	MPC · JPL
334162	2001 SR_{34}	—	September 16, 2001	Socorro	LINEAR	·	1.5 km	MPC · JPL
334163	2001 SP_{78}	—	September 19, 2001	Socorro	LINEAR	·	900 m	MPC · JPL
334164	2001 SG_{89}	—	September 20, 2001	Socorro	LINEAR	EOS	2.4 km	MPC · JPL
334165	2001 SL_{99}	—	September 20, 2001	Socorro	LINEAR	·	1.1 km	MPC · JPL
334166	2001 SG_{104}	—	September 20, 2001	Socorro	LINEAR	V	800 m	MPC · JPL
334167	2001 SP_{119}	—	September 16, 2001	Socorro	LINEAR	ERI	1.7 km	MPC · JPL
334168	2001 ST_{119}	—	September 16, 2001	Socorro	LINEAR	URS	6.3 km	MPC · JPL
334169	2001 SX_{119}	—	September 16, 2001	Socorro	LINEAR	V	970 m	MPC · JPL
334170	2001 SQ_{122}	—	September 16, 2001	Socorro	LINEAR	TIR	3.7 km	MPC · JPL
334171	2001 SN_{123}	—	August 25, 2001	Socorro	LINEAR	·	3.7 km	MPC · JPL
334172	2001 SP_{124}	—	September 16, 2001	Socorro	LINEAR	TIR	3.3 km	MPC · JPL
334173	2001 SY_{125}	—	September 16, 2001	Socorro	LINEAR	NYS	1.1 km	MPC · JPL
334174	2001 SJ_{126}	—	September 16, 2001	Socorro	LINEAR	·	1.6 km	MPC · JPL
334175	2001 SN_{127}	—	September 16, 2001	Socorro	LINEAR	NYS	1.3 km	MPC · JPL
334176	2001 SA_{130}	—	September 16, 2001	Socorro	LINEAR	NYS	1.2 km	MPC · JPL
334177	2001 SC_{133}	—	September 16, 2001	Socorro	LINEAR	LIX	4.5 km	MPC · JPL
334178	2001 SO_{135}	—	September 16, 2001	Socorro	LINEAR	·	3.0 km	MPC · JPL
334179	2001 SO_{142}	—	September 16, 2001	Socorro	LINEAR	·	4.1 km	MPC · JPL
334180	2001 SV_{156}	—	September 17, 2001	Socorro	LINEAR	TIR	3.6 km	MPC · JPL
334181	2001 SD_{157}	—	September 17, 2001	Socorro	LINEAR	V	1.1 km	MPC · JPL
334182	2001 SE_{162}	—	September 17, 2001	Socorro	LINEAR	ERI	2.3 km	MPC · JPL
334183	2001 SR_{162}	—	September 17, 2001	Socorro	LINEAR	·	1.6 km	MPC · JPL
334184	2001 SV_{164}	—	September 17, 2001	Socorro	LINEAR	H	740 m	MPC · JPL
334185	2001 SS_{168}	—	September 19, 2001	Socorro	LINEAR	·	910 m	MPC · JPL
334186	2001 SK_{170}	—	September 16, 2001	Socorro	LINEAR	·	1.9 km	MPC · JPL
334187	2001 SH_{178}	—	September 17, 2001	Socorro	LINEAR	·	1.5 km	MPC · JPL
334188	2001 SP_{195}	—	September 19, 2001	Socorro	LINEAR	VER	2.8 km	MPC · JPL
334189	2001 SU_{197}	—	September 19, 2001	Socorro	LINEAR	·	1.1 km	MPC · JPL
334190	2001 SQ_{199}	—	September 19, 2001	Socorro	LINEAR	·	3.4 km	MPC · JPL
334191	2001 SL_{203}	—	September 19, 2001	Socorro	LINEAR	·	1.4 km	MPC · JPL
334192	2001 SW_{205}	—	September 19, 2001	Socorro	LINEAR	·	2.4 km	MPC · JPL
334193	2001 SD_{206}	—	September 19, 2001	Socorro	LINEAR	·	3.6 km	MPC · JPL
334194	2001 SG_{208}	—	September 18, 2001	Anderson Mesa	LONEOS	MAR	1.4 km	MPC · JPL
334195	2001 SM_{221}	—	September 19, 2001	Socorro	LINEAR	·	1.1 km	MPC · JPL
334196	2001 SE_{230}	—	September 19, 2001	Socorro	LINEAR	·	3.3 km	MPC · JPL
334197	2001 SV_{240}	—	September 19, 2001	Socorro	LINEAR	THM	2.4 km	MPC · JPL
334198	2001 SW_{240}	—	September 19, 2001	Socorro	LINEAR	PHO	860 m	MPC · JPL
334199	2001 SO_{255}	—	September 19, 2001	Socorro	LINEAR	HYG	3.2 km	MPC · JPL
334200	2001 SZ_{265}	—	September 25, 2001	Desert Eagle	W. K. Y. Yeung	NYS	1.3 km	MPC · JPL

== 334201–334300 ==
back to top

Designation			Discovery			Properties		Ref
Permanent	Provisional	Named after	Date	Site	Discoverer(s)	Category	Diam.	Ref
334201	2001 SZ_{289}	—	September 29, 2001	Palomar	NEAT	TIR	4.0 km	MPC · JPL
334202	2001 SS_{291}	—	September 17, 2001	Anderson Mesa	LONEOS	·	2.0 km	MPC · JPL
334203	2001 SO_{298}	—	September 20, 2001	Socorro	LINEAR	(159)	2.5 km	MPC · JPL
334204	2001 SZ_{298}	—	September 20, 2001	Socorro	LINEAR	·	910 m	MPC · JPL
334205	2001 SL_{299}	—	September 20, 2001	Socorro	LINEAR	·	1.4 km	MPC · JPL
334206	2001 SL_{304}	—	September 20, 2001	Socorro	LINEAR	THM	2.6 km	MPC · JPL
334207	2001 SJ_{305}	—	September 20, 2001	Socorro	LINEAR	·	940 m	MPC · JPL
334208	2001 SF_{308}	—	September 21, 2001	Socorro	LINEAR	NYS	1.3 km	MPC · JPL
334209	2001 SZ_{308}	—	September 22, 2001	Socorro	LINEAR	·	3.0 km	MPC · JPL
334210	2001 SQ_{309}	—	September 23, 2001	Socorro	LINEAR	NYS	1.0 km	MPC · JPL
334211	2001 SA_{315}	—	September 25, 2001	Socorro	LINEAR	·	3.5 km	MPC · JPL
334212	2001 SF_{319}	—	September 21, 2001	Socorro	LINEAR	MAS	770 m	MPC · JPL
334213	2001 SC_{324}	—	September 26, 2001	Socorro	LINEAR	NYS	1.1 km	MPC · JPL
334214	2001 SV_{326}	—	September 18, 2001	Kitt Peak	Spacewatch	·	3.9 km	MPC · JPL
334215	2001 SO_{330}	—	September 19, 2001	Socorro	LINEAR	V	680 m	MPC · JPL
334216	2001 SH_{339}	—	September 21, 2001	Palomar	NEAT	·	4.4 km	MPC · JPL
334217	2001 SM_{350}	—	September 22, 2001	Kitt Peak	Spacewatch	·	1.4 km	MPC · JPL
334218	2001 SW_{351}	—	September 18, 2001	Apache Point	SDSS	·	4.0 km	MPC · JPL
334219	2001 SS_{354}	—	September 18, 2001	Anderson Mesa	LONEOS	·	1.3 km	MPC · JPL
334220	2001 TV_{11}	—	October 13, 2001	Socorro	LINEAR	·	1.4 km	MPC · JPL
334221	2001 TU_{24}	—	October 14, 2001	Socorro	LINEAR	L5	10 km	MPC · JPL
334222	2001 TX_{28}	—	October 14, 2001	Socorro	LINEAR	·	2.6 km	MPC · JPL
334223	2001 TP_{30}	—	October 14, 2001	Socorro	LINEAR	·	1.5 km	MPC · JPL
334224	2001 TL_{53}	—	October 13, 2001	Socorro	LINEAR	·	1.4 km	MPC · JPL
334225	2001 TT_{53}	—	October 13, 2001	Socorro	LINEAR	·	1.5 km	MPC · JPL
334226	2001 TN_{54}	—	October 14, 2001	Socorro	LINEAR	H	680 m	MPC · JPL
334227	2001 TM_{57}	—	October 13, 2001	Socorro	LINEAR	·	3.4 km	MPC · JPL
334228	2001 TX_{57}	—	October 13, 2001	Socorro	LINEAR	·	1.7 km	MPC · JPL
334229	2001 TJ_{60}	—	October 13, 2001	Socorro	LINEAR	·	3.7 km	MPC · JPL
334230	2001 TW_{60}	—	October 13, 2001	Socorro	LINEAR	·	1.2 km	MPC · JPL
334231	2001 TQ_{67}	—	October 13, 2001	Socorro	LINEAR	·	1.2 km	MPC · JPL
334232	2001 TH_{70}	—	October 13, 2001	Socorro	LINEAR	NYS	1.4 km	MPC · JPL
334233	2001 TX_{81}	—	October 14, 2001	Socorro	LINEAR	·	3.7 km	MPC · JPL
334234	2001 TT_{83}	—	October 14, 2001	Socorro	LINEAR	HYG	2.9 km	MPC · JPL
334235	2001 TY_{88}	—	October 14, 2001	Socorro	LINEAR	·	3.5 km	MPC · JPL
334236	2001 TM_{91}	—	October 14, 2001	Socorro	LINEAR	·	1.4 km	MPC · JPL
334237	2001 TZ_{92}	—	October 14, 2001	Socorro	LINEAR	·	1.2 km	MPC · JPL
334238	2001 TR_{94}	—	September 26, 2001	Socorro	LINEAR	·	1.6 km	MPC · JPL
334239	2001 TN_{95}	—	October 14, 2001	Socorro	LINEAR	(5)	1.3 km	MPC · JPL
334240	2001 TW_{96}	—	October 14, 2001	Socorro	LINEAR	·	1.1 km	MPC · JPL
334241	2001 TU_{99}	—	October 14, 2001	Socorro	LINEAR	·	3.9 km	MPC · JPL
334242	2001 TA_{103}	—	October 15, 2001	Socorro	LINEAR	THB	3.0 km	MPC · JPL
334243	2001 TR_{109}	—	October 14, 2001	Socorro	LINEAR	·	5.3 km	MPC · JPL
334244	2001 TX_{117}	—	October 15, 2001	Socorro	LINEAR	·	6.3 km	MPC · JPL
334245	2001 TZ_{122}	—	October 12, 2001	Anderson Mesa	LONEOS	·	1.8 km	MPC · JPL
334246	2001 TN_{126}	—	October 13, 2001	Kitt Peak	Spacewatch	VER	2.8 km	MPC · JPL
334247	2001 TT_{141}	—	October 10, 2001	Palomar	NEAT	·	3.3 km	MPC · JPL
334248	2001 TL_{159}	—	October 11, 2001	Palomar	NEAT	·	1.3 km	MPC · JPL
334249	2001 TF_{179}	—	October 14, 2001	Socorro	LINEAR	·	3.6 km	MPC · JPL
334250	2001 TF_{184}	—	October 14, 2001	Socorro	LINEAR	NYS	1.2 km	MPC · JPL
334251	2001 TE_{187}	—	October 14, 2001	Socorro	LINEAR	MAS	880 m	MPC · JPL
334252	2001 TO_{209}	—	October 12, 2001	Haleakala	NEAT	·	1.6 km	MPC · JPL
334253	2001 TT_{211}	—	October 13, 2001	Socorro	LINEAR	·	1.4 km	MPC · JPL
334254	2001 TK_{218}	—	October 14, 2001	Anderson Mesa	LONEOS	·	1.8 km	MPC · JPL
334255	2001 TO_{218}	—	October 14, 2001	Anderson Mesa	LONEOS	V	1.2 km	MPC · JPL
334256	2001 TS_{227}	—	October 15, 2001	Palomar	NEAT	·	1.7 km	MPC · JPL
334257	2001 TA_{230}	—	October 15, 2001	Kitt Peak	Spacewatch	L5	10 km	MPC · JPL
334258	2001 TK_{235}	—	September 25, 2001	Socorro	LINEAR	·	1.7 km	MPC · JPL
334259	2001 TC_{245}	—	October 14, 2001	Apache Point	SDSS	·	3.1 km	MPC · JPL
334260	2001 TJ_{254}	—	October 14, 2001	Apache Point	SDSS	L5	10 km	MPC · JPL
334261	2001 TK_{260}	—	October 14, 2001	Apache Point	SDSS	·	890 m	MPC · JPL
334262	2001 TF_{261}	—	October 10, 2001	Palomar	NEAT	·	1.8 km	MPC · JPL
334263	2001 UD	—	October 16, 2001	Farra d'Isonzo	Farra d'Isonzo	·	3.9 km	MPC · JPL
334264	2001 UH_{6}	—	October 22, 2001	Emerald Lane	L. Ball	·	1.5 km	MPC · JPL
334265	2001 UZ_{8}	—	October 17, 2001	Socorro	LINEAR	NYS	1.1 km	MPC · JPL
334266	2001 UZ_{25}	—	October 18, 2001	Socorro	LINEAR	·	1.6 km	MPC · JPL
334267	2001 UX_{27}	—	October 16, 2001	Socorro	LINEAR	·	1.6 km	MPC · JPL
334268	2001 UE_{38}	—	October 17, 2001	Socorro	LINEAR	·	940 m	MPC · JPL
334269	2001 UC_{40}	—	October 17, 2001	Socorro	LINEAR	MAS	870 m	MPC · JPL
334270	2001 UD_{40}	—	October 17, 2001	Socorro	LINEAR	MAS	830 m	MPC · JPL
334271	2001 UA_{42}	—	October 17, 2001	Socorro	LINEAR	NYS	1.6 km	MPC · JPL
334272	2001 UN_{58}	—	October 17, 2001	Socorro	LINEAR	LIX	3.5 km	MPC · JPL
334273	2001 UY_{62}	—	October 17, 2001	Socorro	LINEAR	·	4.1 km	MPC · JPL
334274	2001 UZ_{73}	—	October 17, 2001	Socorro	LINEAR	·	1.3 km	MPC · JPL
334275	2001 UU_{74}	—	October 17, 2001	Socorro	LINEAR	MAS	1.0 km	MPC · JPL
334276	2001 UY_{89}	—	October 21, 2001	Kitt Peak	Spacewatch	HYG	2.8 km	MPC · JPL
334277	2001 UZ_{89}	—	October 21, 2001	Kitt Peak	Spacewatch	·	1.3 km	MPC · JPL
334278	2001 UU_{99}	—	October 17, 2001	Socorro	LINEAR	·	1.6 km	MPC · JPL
334279	2001 UQ_{116}	—	October 22, 2001	Socorro	LINEAR	MAS	980 m	MPC · JPL
334280	2001 UJ_{133}	—	October 21, 2001	Socorro	LINEAR	·	2.7 km	MPC · JPL
334281	2001 UQ_{133}	—	October 21, 2001	Socorro	LINEAR	·	3.0 km	MPC · JPL
334282	2001 UR_{134}	—	October 21, 2001	Socorro	LINEAR	NYS	1.2 km	MPC · JPL
334283	2001 UM_{148}	—	October 23, 2001	Socorro	LINEAR	·	1.1 km	MPC · JPL
334284	2001 UQ_{161}	—	October 23, 2001	Socorro	LINEAR	·	2.1 km	MPC · JPL
334285	2001 UF_{164}	—	October 18, 2001	Palomar	NEAT	·	1.5 km	MPC · JPL
334286	2001 UE_{170}	—	October 21, 2001	Socorro	LINEAR	·	1.1 km	MPC · JPL
334287	2001 UU_{170}	—	October 21, 2001	Socorro	LINEAR	·	1.5 km	MPC · JPL
334288	2001 UA_{179}	—	October 24, 2001	Palomar	NEAT	·	1.2 km	MPC · JPL
334289	2001 UD_{179}	—	September 20, 2001	Socorro	LINEAR	·	1.9 km	MPC · JPL
334290	2001 UO_{184}	—	October 16, 2001	Palomar	NEAT	·	1.1 km	MPC · JPL
334291	2001 UT_{199}	—	October 19, 2001	Palomar	NEAT	·	1.9 km	MPC · JPL
334292	2001 UP_{201}	—	October 21, 2001	Socorro	LINEAR	·	1.9 km	MPC · JPL
334293	2001 UX_{202}	—	October 19, 2001	Palomar	NEAT	NYS	1.4 km	MPC · JPL
334294	2001 UC_{219}	—	October 17, 2001	Desert Eagle	W. K. Y. Yeung	MAS	890 m	MPC · JPL
334295	2001 UM_{220}	—	October 21, 2001	Socorro	LINEAR	NYS	1.4 km	MPC · JPL
334296	2001 UL_{221}	—	October 23, 2001	Socorro	LINEAR	·	1.3 km	MPC · JPL
334297	2001 UT_{223}	—	October 16, 2001	Palomar	NEAT	·	1.5 km	MPC · JPL
334298	2001 VU_{2}	—	November 9, 2001	Socorro	LINEAR	·	1.6 km	MPC · JPL
334299	2001 VD_{8}	—	November 9, 2001	Socorro	LINEAR	·	2.9 km	MPC · JPL
334300	2001 VV_{15}	—	November 6, 2001	Palomar	NEAT	·	2.5 km	MPC · JPL

== 334301–334400 ==
back to top

Designation			Discovery			Properties		Ref
Permanent	Provisional	Named after	Date	Site	Discoverer(s)	Category	Diam.	Ref
334301	2001 VM_{55}	—	November 10, 2001	Socorro	LINEAR	·	2.1 km	MPC · JPL
334302	2001 VU_{57}	—	November 10, 2001	Socorro	LINEAR	·	1.8 km	MPC · JPL
334303	2001 VS_{63}	—	November 10, 2001	Socorro	LINEAR	·	1.2 km	MPC · JPL
334304	2001 VW_{63}	—	November 10, 2001	Socorro	LINEAR	·	1.4 km	MPC · JPL
334305	2001 VZ_{88}	—	November 12, 2001	Socorro	LINEAR	·	4.6 km	MPC · JPL
334306	2001 VZ_{90}	—	November 15, 2001	Socorro	LINEAR	·	3.1 km	MPC · JPL
334307	2001 VS_{106}	—	November 12, 2001	Socorro	LINEAR	·	1.9 km	MPC · JPL
334308	2001 VM_{107}	—	November 12, 2001	Socorro	LINEAR	·	1.5 km	MPC · JPL
334309	2001 VQ_{109}	—	November 12, 2001	Socorro	LINEAR	·	1.5 km	MPC · JPL
334310	2001 VY_{113}	—	November 12, 2001	Socorro	LINEAR	·	1.3 km	MPC · JPL
334311	2001 VV_{124}	—	November 10, 2001	Socorro	LINEAR	·	1.6 km	MPC · JPL
334312	2001 VT_{125}	—	November 12, 2001	Kitt Peak	Spacewatch	·	1.0 km	MPC · JPL
334313	2001 VM_{128}	—	November 11, 2001	Apache Point	SDSS	L5	8.0 km	MPC · JPL
334314	2001 VY_{132}	—	November 11, 2001	Socorro	LINEAR	·	3.4 km	MPC · JPL
334315	2001 VF_{134}	—	November 12, 2001	Apache Point	SDSS	L5	9.9 km	MPC · JPL
334316	2001 WT_{17}	—	November 17, 2001	Socorro	LINEAR	·	1.3 km	MPC · JPL
334317	2001 WK_{23}	—	November 16, 2001	Kitt Peak	Spacewatch	THB	3.1 km	MPC · JPL
334318	2001 WD_{30}	—	November 17, 2001	Socorro	LINEAR	NYS	1.3 km	MPC · JPL
334319	2001 WU_{57}	—	November 19, 2001	Socorro	LINEAR	L5	10 km	MPC · JPL
334320	2001 WT_{59}	—	October 21, 2001	Socorro	LINEAR	·	2.2 km	MPC · JPL
334321	2001 WX_{63}	—	November 19, 2001	Socorro	LINEAR	NYS	1.3 km	MPC · JPL
334322	2001 WN_{95}	—	November 20, 2001	Kitt Peak	Spacewatch	MAS	640 m	MPC · JPL
334323	2001 WR_{97}	—	November 18, 2001	Kitt Peak	Spacewatch	MAS	860 m	MPC · JPL
334324	2001 WW_{99}	—	November 20, 2001	Socorro	LINEAR	·	1.1 km	MPC · JPL
334325	2001 WG_{102}	—	November 19, 2001	Anderson Mesa	LONEOS	·	4.8 km	MPC · JPL
334326	2001 XH	—	December 3, 2001	Socorro	LINEAR	PHO	1.2 km	MPC · JPL
334327	2001 XA_{8}	—	December 8, 2001	Socorro	LINEAR	H	800 m	MPC · JPL
334328	2001 XL_{51}	—	December 10, 2001	Socorro	LINEAR	CLA	1.6 km	MPC · JPL
334329	2001 XX_{57}	—	December 11, 2001	Socorro	LINEAR	·	1.4 km	MPC · JPL
334330	2001 XJ_{77}	—	December 11, 2001	Socorro	LINEAR	·	1.3 km	MPC · JPL
334331	2001 XW_{92}	—	December 10, 2001	Socorro	LINEAR	·	2.0 km	MPC · JPL
334332	2001 XH_{126}	—	November 21, 2001	Socorro	LINEAR	GEF	1.3 km	MPC · JPL
334333	2001 XP_{126}	—	December 14, 2001	Socorro	LINEAR	MAS	660 m	MPC · JPL
334334	2001 XH_{137}	—	December 14, 2001	Socorro	LINEAR	·	1.4 km	MPC · JPL
334335	2001 XY_{145}	—	December 14, 2001	Socorro	LINEAR	·	920 m	MPC · JPL
334336	2001 XY_{167}	—	December 14, 2001	Socorro	LINEAR	·	2.3 km	MPC · JPL
334337	2001 XO_{177}	—	December 14, 2001	Socorro	LINEAR	·	1.8 km	MPC · JPL
334338	2001 XN_{180}	—	December 14, 2001	Socorro	LINEAR	·	1.5 km	MPC · JPL
334339	2001 XA_{199}	—	December 14, 2001	Socorro	LINEAR	·	3.9 km	MPC · JPL
334340	2001 XS_{217}	—	December 14, 2001	Socorro	LINEAR	·	2.2 km	MPC · JPL
334341	2001 XW_{228}	—	December 15, 2001	Socorro	LINEAR	·	1.1 km	MPC · JPL
334342	2001 XO_{231}	—	December 15, 2001	Socorro	LINEAR	·	1.6 km	MPC · JPL
334343	2001 XO_{232}	—	December 15, 2001	Socorro	LINEAR	·	1.6 km	MPC · JPL
334344	2001 XJ_{233}	—	December 15, 2001	Socorro	LINEAR	MAS	1.1 km	MPC · JPL
334345	2001 XC_{264}	—	December 14, 2001	Palomar	NEAT	·	810 m	MPC · JPL
334346	2001 YA_{4}	—	December 22, 2001	Socorro	LINEAR	·	2.0 km	MPC · JPL
334347	2001 YD_{13}	—	December 17, 2001	Socorro	LINEAR	MAS	710 m	MPC · JPL
334348	2001 YW_{18}	—	December 17, 2001	Socorro	LINEAR	·	1.0 km	MPC · JPL
334349	2001 YA_{21}	—	December 18, 2001	Socorro	LINEAR	V	870 m	MPC · JPL
334350	2001 YE_{26}	—	December 18, 2001	Socorro	LINEAR	MAS	810 m	MPC · JPL
334351	2001 YN_{33}	—	December 18, 2001	Socorro	LINEAR	·	1.6 km	MPC · JPL
334352	2001 YF_{52}	—	December 18, 2001	Socorro	LINEAR	·	3.6 km	MPC · JPL
334353	2001 YG_{59}	—	December 18, 2001	Socorro	LINEAR	·	1.9 km	MPC · JPL
334354	2001 YD_{77}	—	December 18, 2001	Socorro	LINEAR	·	4.2 km	MPC · JPL
334355	2001 YP_{94}	—	December 19, 2001	Kitt Peak	Spacewatch	·	1.2 km	MPC · JPL
334356	2001 YY_{97}	—	December 17, 2001	Socorro	LINEAR	NYS	1.6 km	MPC · JPL
334357	2001 YV_{99}	—	December 17, 2001	Socorro	LINEAR	·	1.3 km	MPC · JPL
334358	2001 YV_{119}	—	December 19, 2001	Socorro	LINEAR	·	2.7 km	MPC · JPL
334359	2001 YK_{125}	—	December 17, 2001	Socorro	LINEAR	·	2.7 km	MPC · JPL
334360	2001 YO_{133}	—	December 18, 2001	Kitt Peak	Spacewatch	·	3.2 km	MPC · JPL
334361	2001 YN_{161}	—	December 20, 2001	Apache Point	SDSS	·	1.8 km	MPC · JPL
334362	2002 AE_{20}	—	January 5, 2002	Haleakala	NEAT	·	1.8 km	MPC · JPL
334363	2002 AZ_{31}	—	January 9, 2002	Bergisch Gladbach	W. Bickel	·	990 m	MPC · JPL
334364	2002 AP_{32}	—	January 8, 2002	Haleakala	NEAT	·	1.9 km	MPC · JPL
334365	2002 AA_{35}	—	January 7, 2002	Socorro	LINEAR	·	2.4 km	MPC · JPL
334366	2002 AD_{44}	—	January 9, 2002	Socorro	LINEAR	·	1.5 km	MPC · JPL
334367	2002 AA_{47}	—	December 14, 2001	Kitt Peak	Spacewatch	DOR	2.0 km	MPC · JPL
334368	2002 AB_{47}	—	January 9, 2002	Socorro	LINEAR	·	1.2 km	MPC · JPL
334369	2002 AL_{48}	—	January 9, 2002	Socorro	LINEAR	·	1.7 km	MPC · JPL
334370	2002 AN_{58}	—	January 9, 2002	Socorro	LINEAR	·	2.0 km	MPC · JPL
334371	2002 AB_{78}	—	January 8, 2002	Socorro	LINEAR	·	2.2 km	MPC · JPL
334372	2002 AT_{98}	—	January 8, 2002	Socorro	LINEAR	·	1.5 km	MPC · JPL
334373	2002 AB_{114}	—	January 9, 2002	Socorro	LINEAR	PHO	1.3 km	MPC · JPL
334374	2002 AN_{115}	—	January 9, 2002	Socorro	LINEAR	BRG	2.0 km	MPC · JPL
334375	2002 AR_{121}	—	January 9, 2002	Socorro	LINEAR	·	2.7 km	MPC · JPL
334376	2002 AB_{133}	—	January 8, 2002	Socorro	LINEAR	·	1.4 km	MPC · JPL
334377	2002 AK_{158}	—	January 13, 2002	Socorro	LINEAR	·	1.5 km	MPC · JPL
334378	2002 AG_{166}	—	January 13, 2002	Socorro	LINEAR	(10369)	3.6 km	MPC · JPL
334379	2002 AV_{185}	—	January 8, 2002	Socorro	LINEAR	·	1.8 km	MPC · JPL
334380	2002 AS_{202}	—	January 13, 2002	Socorro	LINEAR	·	1.4 km	MPC · JPL
334381	2002 AP_{208}	—	January 14, 2002	Apache Point	SDSS	·	1.4 km	MPC · JPL
334382	2002 BY_{15}	—	January 19, 2002	Socorro	LINEAR	(5)	1.6 km	MPC · JPL
334383	2002 BL_{24}	—	January 23, 2002	Socorro	LINEAR	·	1.5 km	MPC · JPL
334384	2002 BL_{26}	—	January 26, 2002	Socorro	LINEAR	T_{j} (2.99)	3.1 km	MPC · JPL
334385	2002 BC_{27}	—	January 17, 2002	Palomar	NEAT	·	3.3 km	MPC · JPL
334386	2002 CZ_{26}	—	February 6, 2002	Socorro	LINEAR	·	1.5 km	MPC · JPL
334387	2002 CY_{30}	—	February 6, 2002	Socorro	LINEAR	·	2.0 km	MPC · JPL
334388	2002 CH_{38}	—	February 7, 2002	Socorro	LINEAR	·	1.2 km	MPC · JPL
334389	2002 CM_{83}	—	February 7, 2002	Socorro	LINEAR	·	2.6 km	MPC · JPL
334390	2002 CT_{90}	—	February 7, 2002	Socorro	LINEAR	·	2.5 km	MPC · JPL
334391	2002 CT_{93}	—	February 7, 2002	Socorro	LINEAR	RAF	950 m	MPC · JPL
334392	2002 CC_{118}	—	February 14, 2002	Desert Eagle	W. K. Y. Yeung	EUN	1.8 km	MPC · JPL
334393	2002 CP_{145}	—	February 9, 2002	Socorro	LINEAR	TIR	4.0 km	MPC · JPL
334394	2002 CF_{157}	—	February 7, 2002	Socorro	LINEAR	·	2.6 km	MPC · JPL
334395	2002 CT_{170}	—	February 8, 2002	Socorro	LINEAR	RAF	1.7 km	MPC · JPL
334396	2002 CT_{194}	—	February 10, 2002	Socorro	LINEAR	KON	2.3 km	MPC · JPL
334397	2002 CO_{200}	—	February 10, 2002	Socorro	LINEAR	MAR	1.1 km	MPC · JPL
334398	2002 CP_{212}	—	February 10, 2002	Socorro	LINEAR	·	1.5 km	MPC · JPL
334399	2002 CG_{214}	—	February 10, 2002	Socorro	LINEAR	(5)	1.2 km	MPC · JPL
334400	2002 CL_{264}	—	February 8, 2002	Kitt Peak	M. W. Buie	·	950 m	MPC · JPL

== 334401–334500 ==
back to top

Designation			Discovery			Properties		Ref
Permanent	Provisional	Named after	Date	Site	Discoverer(s)	Category	Diam.	Ref
334401	2002 CA_{269}	—	February 7, 2002	Socorro	LINEAR	·	2.1 km	MPC · JPL
334402	2002 CJ_{274}	—	February 8, 2002	Kitt Peak	Spacewatch	·	1.4 km	MPC · JPL
334403	2002 CC_{277}	—	February 7, 2002	Palomar	NEAT	·	4.7 km	MPC · JPL
334404	2002 CV_{281}	—	February 8, 2002	Kitt Peak	Spacewatch	·	1.3 km	MPC · JPL
334405	2002 CL_{284}	—	February 9, 2002	Kitt Peak	Spacewatch	·	1.2 km	MPC · JPL
334406	2002 CR_{304}	—	February 15, 2002	Socorro	LINEAR	·	3.9 km	MPC · JPL
334407	2002 CM_{311}	—	February 11, 2002	Socorro	LINEAR	·	1.4 km	MPC · JPL
334408	2002 DK_{14}	—	February 20, 2002	Socorro	LINEAR	GEF	1.6 km	MPC · JPL
334409	2002 DS_{15}	—	February 16, 2002	Palomar	NEAT	·	840 m	MPC · JPL
334410	2002 DC_{17}	—	February 20, 2002	Anderson Mesa	LONEOS	·	2.2 km	MPC · JPL
334411	2002 DW_{19}	—	February 16, 2002	Palomar	NEAT	·	3.2 km	MPC · JPL
334412	2002 EZ_{2}	—	March 9, 2002	Palomar	NEAT	AMO	310 m	MPC · JPL
334413	2002 EO_{38}	—	February 9, 2002	Kitt Peak	Spacewatch	·	1.8 km	MPC · JPL
334414	2002 ES_{38}	—	March 12, 2002	Kitt Peak	Spacewatch	·	2.1 km	MPC · JPL
334415	2002 EN_{42}	—	February 15, 2002	Socorro	LINEAR	·	1.6 km	MPC · JPL
334416	2002 EV_{60}	—	March 13, 2002	Socorro	LINEAR	·	2.6 km	MPC · JPL
334417	2002 EA_{63}	—	March 13, 2002	Socorro	LINEAR	MAS	810 m	MPC · JPL
334418	2002 ER_{113}	—	March 10, 2002	Kitt Peak	Spacewatch	·	1.7 km	MPC · JPL
334419	2002 EV_{113}	—	March 10, 2002	Kitt Peak	Spacewatch	EUN	1.4 km	MPC · JPL
334420	2002 EG_{131}	—	March 13, 2002	Socorro	LINEAR	·	1.3 km	MPC · JPL
334421	2002 ED_{142}	—	March 12, 2002	Palomar	NEAT	·	1.9 km	MPC · JPL
334422	2002 EM_{144}	—	March 6, 2002	Palomar	NEAT	·	2.1 km	MPC · JPL
334423	2002 EB_{151}	—	March 15, 2002	Palomar	NEAT	·	2.3 km	MPC · JPL
334424	2002 EB_{152}	—	March 13, 2002	Socorro	LINEAR	·	2.3 km	MPC · JPL
334425	2002 EW_{161}	—	March 6, 2002	Palomar	NEAT	·	3.7 km	MPC · JPL
334426	2002 GM_{34}	—	April 1, 2002	Palomar	NEAT	·	1.8 km	MPC · JPL
334427	2002 GX_{34}	—	April 2, 2002	Palomar	NEAT	·	1.6 km	MPC · JPL
334428	2002 GD_{41}	—	April 4, 2002	Kitt Peak	Spacewatch	·	3.2 km	MPC · JPL
334429	2002 GQ_{47}	—	April 4, 2002	Kitt Peak	Spacewatch	HIL · 3:2	6.7 km	MPC · JPL
334430	2002 GJ_{58}	—	April 8, 2002	Palomar	NEAT	·	2.8 km	MPC · JPL
334431	2002 GD_{85}	—	April 10, 2002	Socorro	LINEAR	(5)	1.4 km	MPC · JPL
334432	2002 GM_{100}	—	April 10, 2002	Socorro	LINEAR	EUN	1.4 km	MPC · JPL
334433	2002 GM_{109}	—	April 11, 2002	Palomar	NEAT	·	2.9 km	MPC · JPL
334434	2002 GT_{116}	—	April 11, 2002	Socorro	LINEAR	EUN	1.5 km	MPC · JPL
334435	2002 GS_{138}	—	April 12, 2002	Haleakala	NEAT	·	2.1 km	MPC · JPL
334436	2002 GL_{142}	—	April 13, 2002	Palomar	NEAT	TIR	3.6 km	MPC · JPL
334437	2002 GE_{148}	—	April 14, 2002	Palomar	NEAT	RAF	1.7 km	MPC · JPL
334438	2002 GD_{160}	—	April 14, 2002	Palomar	NEAT	·	1.8 km	MPC · JPL
334439	2002 GN_{184}	—	April 8, 2002	Palomar	NEAT	·	560 m	MPC · JPL
334440	2002 JL_{19}	—	May 7, 2002	Palomar	NEAT	·	2.8 km	MPC · JPL
334441	2002 JJ_{119}	—	May 5, 2002	Anderson Mesa	LONEOS	·	3.3 km	MPC · JPL
334442	2002 JG_{121}	—	May 5, 2002	Palomar	NEAT	·	2.6 km	MPC · JPL
334443	2002 JR_{144}	—	May 13, 2002	Palomar	NEAT	·	1.6 km	MPC · JPL
334444	2002 JU_{150}	—	January 9, 2006	Apache Point	SDSS	·	1.5 km	MPC · JPL
334445	2002 KQ_{16}	—	February 4, 2005	Apache Point	SDSS	·	2.9 km	MPC · JPL
334446	2002 LB_{1}	—	June 2, 2002	Palomar	NEAT	·	1.4 km	MPC · JPL
334447	2002 LD_{44}	—	June 10, 2002	Palomar	NEAT	·	2.6 km	MPC · JPL
334448	2002 LJ_{61}	—	June 4, 2002	Palomar	NEAT	·	3.4 km	MPC · JPL
334449	2002 NJ_{11}	—	July 4, 2002	Palomar	NEAT	·	870 m	MPC · JPL
334450	2002 NP_{16}	—	July 5, 2002	Socorro	LINEAR	·	3.4 km	MPC · JPL
334451	2002 NM_{41}	—	July 14, 2002	Palomar	NEAT	·	2.2 km	MPC · JPL
334452	2002 NE_{63}	—	July 9, 2002	Palomar	NEAT	KOR	1.5 km	MPC · JPL
334453	2002 NC_{69}	—	July 14, 2002	Palomar	NEAT	·	2.1 km	MPC · JPL
334454	2002 NK_{69}	—	July 5, 2002	Palomar	NEAT	BRA	2.0 km	MPC · JPL
334455	2002 NZ_{73}	—	July 5, 2002	Palomar	NEAT	·	1.1 km	MPC · JPL
334456	2002 NT_{77}	—	March 7, 2008	Kitt Peak	Spacewatch	·	730 m	MPC · JPL
334457	2002 OH_{21}	—	July 29, 2002	Palomar	NEAT	·	950 m	MPC · JPL
334458	2002 OG_{28}	—	December 20, 2004	Mount Lemmon	Mount Lemmon Survey	·	1.9 km	MPC · JPL
334459	2002 PY_{10}	—	August 5, 2002	Palomar	NEAT	·	950 m	MPC · JPL
334460	2002 PR_{19}	—	August 6, 2002	Palomar	NEAT	·	3.8 km	MPC · JPL
334461	2002 PJ_{21}	—	August 6, 2002	Palomar	NEAT	·	790 m	MPC · JPL
334462	2002 PV_{32}	—	August 6, 2002	Palomar	NEAT	(2076)	810 m	MPC · JPL
334463	2002 PY_{45}	—	August 9, 2002	Socorro	LINEAR	·	910 m	MPC · JPL
334464	2002 PG_{65}	—	August 11, 2002	Palomar	NEAT	·	840 m	MPC · JPL
334465	2002 PZ_{76}	—	February 23, 1998	Kitt Peak	Spacewatch	·	710 m	MPC · JPL
334466	2002 PA_{123}	—	August 15, 2002	Palomar	NEAT	·	4.3 km	MPC · JPL
334467	2002 PH_{129}	—	August 14, 2002	Socorro	LINEAR	·	980 m	MPC · JPL
334468	2002 PA_{132}	—	August 13, 2002	Anderson Mesa	LONEOS	·	600 m	MPC · JPL
334469	2002 PO_{152}	—	August 8, 2002	Palomar	NEAT	·	720 m	MPC · JPL
334470	2002 PM_{163}	—	August 8, 2002	Palomar	S. F. Hönig	·	3.8 km	MPC · JPL
334471	2002 PM_{174}	—	August 15, 2002	Palomar	NEAT	NAE	3.8 km	MPC · JPL
334472	2002 PK_{185}	—	August 4, 2002	Palomar	NEAT	EOS	4.8 km	MPC · JPL
334473	2002 PE_{186}	—	August 15, 2002	Palomar	NEAT	·	700 m	MPC · JPL
334474	2002 PK_{187}	—	August 11, 2002	Palomar	NEAT	·	2.2 km	MPC · JPL
334475	2002 PR_{187}	—	August 8, 2002	Palomar	NEAT	·	960 m	MPC · JPL
334476	2002 PA_{188}	—	August 8, 2002	Palomar	NEAT	·	2.4 km	MPC · JPL
334477	2002 PX_{192}	—	August 8, 2002	Palomar	NEAT	·	630 m	MPC · JPL
334478	2002 PZ_{194}	—	May 9, 2005	Mount Lemmon	Mount Lemmon Survey	·	580 m	MPC · JPL
334479	2002 PV_{195}	—	September 20, 2008	Kitt Peak	Spacewatch	·	2.4 km	MPC · JPL
334480	2002 PF_{197}	—	March 13, 2010	Catalina	CSS	·	2.2 km	MPC · JPL
334481	2002 QM_{6}	—	August 18, 2002	Haleakala	NEAT	H	680 m	MPC · JPL
334482	2002 QE_{18}	—	August 28, 2002	Palomar	NEAT	·	1.9 km	MPC · JPL
334483	2002 QN_{19}	—	August 26, 2002	Palomar	NEAT	ARM	4.7 km	MPC · JPL
334484	2002 QO_{22}	—	August 27, 2002	Palomar	NEAT	·	690 m	MPC · JPL
334485	2002 QK_{27}	—	August 28, 2002	Palomar	NEAT	·	2.4 km	MPC · JPL
334486	2002 QC_{30}	—	August 29, 2002	Palomar	NEAT	·	2.9 km	MPC · JPL
334487	2002 QL_{30}	—	August 29, 2002	Palomar	NEAT	·	590 m	MPC · JPL
334488	2002 QW_{36}	—	August 30, 2002	Kitt Peak	Spacewatch	·	650 m	MPC · JPL
334489	2002 QY_{51}	—	August 29, 2002	Palomar	S. F. Hönig	EUN	1.4 km	MPC · JPL
334490	2002 QN_{57}	—	August 17, 2002	Palomar	Lowe, A.	·	800 m	MPC · JPL
334491	2002 QH_{60}	—	August 16, 2002	Palomar	NEAT	·	2.3 km	MPC · JPL
334492	2002 QG_{68}	—	August 29, 2002	Palomar	NEAT	·	990 m	MPC · JPL
334493	2002 QC_{69}	—	August 30, 2002	Palomar	NEAT	EOS	2.3 km	MPC · JPL
334494	2002 QS_{71}	—	August 19, 2002	Palomar	NEAT	·	2.3 km	MPC · JPL
334495	2002 QO_{88}	—	August 19, 2002	Palomar	NEAT	·	2.5 km	MPC · JPL
334496	2002 QT_{88}	—	August 28, 2002	Palomar	NEAT	·	720 m	MPC · JPL
334497	2002 QD_{89}	—	August 27, 2002	Palomar	NEAT	KOR	1.4 km	MPC · JPL
334498	2002 QX_{93}	—	August 18, 2002	Palomar	NEAT	·	2.1 km	MPC · JPL
334499	2002 QY_{93}	—	August 18, 2002	Palomar	NEAT	EOS	1.9 km	MPC · JPL
334500	2002 QH_{94}	—	August 27, 2002	Palomar	NEAT	·	2.8 km	MPC · JPL

== 334501–334600 ==
back to top

Designation			Discovery			Properties		Ref
Permanent	Provisional	Named after	Date	Site	Discoverer(s)	Category	Diam.	Ref
334501	2002 QJ_{107}	—	August 27, 2002	Palomar	NEAT	·	2.7 km	MPC · JPL
334502	2002 QH_{124}	—	August 16, 2002	Palomar	NEAT	·	780 m	MPC · JPL
334503	2002 QF_{130}	—	August 30, 2002	Palomar	NEAT	·	620 m	MPC · JPL
334504	2002 QN_{135}	—	August 30, 2002	Palomar	NEAT	·	1.9 km	MPC · JPL
334505	2002 QO_{136}	—	August 26, 2002	Palomar	NEAT	·	600 m	MPC · JPL
334506	2002 QG_{146}	—	March 15, 2010	Mount Lemmon	Mount Lemmon Survey	TRE	3.9 km	MPC · JPL
334507	2002 QM_{148}	—	November 25, 2006	Kitt Peak	Spacewatch	·	880 m	MPC · JPL
334508	2002 QZ_{152}	—	September 30, 2010	Mount Lemmon	Mount Lemmon Survey	·	1.4 km	MPC · JPL
334509	2002 RE_{19}	—	September 4, 2002	Anderson Mesa	LONEOS	·	1.0 km	MPC · JPL
334510	2002 RQ_{26}	—	September 4, 2002	Palomar	NEAT	·	840 m	MPC · JPL
334511	2002 RM_{53}	—	September 5, 2002	Socorro	LINEAR	·	690 m	MPC · JPL
334512	2002 RN_{54}	—	September 5, 2002	Socorro	LINEAR	·	810 m	MPC · JPL
334513	2002 RZ_{58}	—	September 5, 2002	Anderson Mesa	LONEOS	·	880 m	MPC · JPL
334514	2002 RK_{59}	—	September 5, 2002	Anderson Mesa	LONEOS	·	1.7 km	MPC · JPL
334515	2002 RY_{69}	—	September 4, 2002	Anderson Mesa	LONEOS	·	810 m	MPC · JPL
334516	2002 RC_{82}	—	September 5, 2002	Socorro	LINEAR	·	1.1 km	MPC · JPL
334517	2002 RP_{82}	—	September 5, 2002	Socorro	LINEAR	·	710 m	MPC · JPL
334518	2002 RO_{99}	—	September 5, 2002	Socorro	LINEAR	·	1.1 km	MPC · JPL
334519	2002 RE_{105}	—	September 5, 2002	Socorro	LINEAR	V	870 m	MPC · JPL
334520	2002 RM_{125}	—	September 3, 2002	Palomar	NEAT	·	2.5 km	MPC · JPL
334521	2002 RX_{135}	—	September 11, 2002	Haleakala	NEAT	(883)	980 m	MPC · JPL
334522	2002 RZ_{136}	—	September 12, 2002	Haleakala	NEAT	·	700 m	MPC · JPL
334523	2002 RU_{150}	—	September 12, 2002	Palomar	NEAT	·	2.6 km	MPC · JPL
334524	2002 RL_{163}	—	September 12, 2002	Palomar	NEAT	·	650 m	MPC · JPL
334525	2002 RW_{170}	—	September 13, 2002	Palomar	NEAT	·	670 m	MPC · JPL
334526	2002 RX_{186}	—	September 12, 2002	Palomar	NEAT	·	2.8 km	MPC · JPL
334527	2002 RG_{189}	—	September 13, 2002	Goodricke-Pigott	R. A. Tucker	·	920 m	MPC · JPL
334528	2002 RY_{198}	—	September 13, 2002	Palomar	NEAT	·	3.6 km	MPC · JPL
334529	2002 RJ_{204}	—	September 14, 2002	Palomar	NEAT	TRE	3.5 km	MPC · JPL
334530	2002 RB_{219}	—	September 15, 2002	Palomar	NEAT	·	810 m	MPC · JPL
334531	2002 RO_{220}	—	September 15, 2002	Haleakala	NEAT	·	1.3 km	MPC · JPL
334532	2002 RL_{227}	—	September 6, 2002	Socorro	LINEAR	·	750 m	MPC · JPL
334533	2002 RV_{232}	—	September 11, 2002	Palomar	White, M., M. Collins	·	1.6 km	MPC · JPL
334534	2002 RA_{240}	—	September 14, 2002	Palomar	R. Matson	·	2.3 km	MPC · JPL
334535	2002 RL_{243}	—	September 4, 2002	Palomar	NEAT	NAE	4.2 km	MPC · JPL
334536	2002 RT_{243}	—	September 13, 2002	Palomar	NEAT	·	2.3 km	MPC · JPL
334537	2002 RP_{244}	—	September 15, 2002	Palomar	NEAT	·	750 m	MPC · JPL
334538	2002 RA_{246}	—	September 14, 2002	Palomar	NEAT	·	530 m	MPC · JPL
334539	2002 RV_{247}	—	September 15, 2002	Palomar	NEAT	EMA	4.6 km	MPC · JPL
334540	2002 RC_{260}	—	September 15, 2002	Palomar	NEAT	·	3.0 km	MPC · JPL
334541	2002 RY_{269}	—	September 4, 2002	Palomar	NEAT	·	600 m	MPC · JPL
334542	2002 RW_{274}	—	September 4, 2002	Palomar	NEAT	·	1.2 km	MPC · JPL
334543	2002 RH_{277}	—	September 15, 2002	Palomar	NEAT	·	3.2 km	MPC · JPL
334544	2002 RP_{277}	—	September 4, 2002	Palomar	NEAT	·	870 m	MPC · JPL
334545	2002 RC_{278}	—	September 4, 2002	Palomar	NEAT	·	2.6 km	MPC · JPL
334546	2002 ST_{7}	—	September 27, 2002	Palomar	NEAT	(1338) (FLO)	600 m	MPC · JPL
334547	2002 SV_{19}	—	September 26, 2002	Palomar	NEAT	H	720 m	MPC · JPL
334548	2002 SY_{19}	—	September 28, 2002	Palomar	NEAT	PHO	1.1 km	MPC · JPL
334549	2002 SU_{29}	—	September 28, 2002	Haleakala	NEAT	T_{j} (2.96) · HIL · 3:2	6.2 km	MPC · JPL
334550	2002 SY_{32}	—	September 28, 2002	Haleakala	NEAT	·	1.0 km	MPC · JPL
334551	2002 SW_{37}	—	September 29, 2002	Haleakala	NEAT	·	3.1 km	MPC · JPL
334552	2002 SS_{43}	—	September 29, 2002	Haleakala	NEAT	·	2.5 km	MPC · JPL
334553	2002 SV_{47}	—	September 30, 2002	Socorro	LINEAR	EOS	2.4 km	MPC · JPL
334554	2002 SE_{54}	—	September 30, 2002	Socorro	LINEAR	·	950 m	MPC · JPL
334555	2002 SP_{66}	—	September 16, 2002	Palomar	NEAT	·	2.0 km	MPC · JPL
334556	2002 SS_{69}	—	September 29, 2002	Haleakala	NEAT	TEL	1.6 km	MPC · JPL
334557	2002 SD_{71}	—	September 26, 2002	Palomar	NEAT	·	620 m	MPC · JPL
334558	2002 TV_{5}	—	October 1, 2002	Anderson Mesa	LONEOS	EOS	2.7 km	MPC · JPL
334559	2002 TK_{11}	—	October 1, 2002	Anderson Mesa	LONEOS	THB	6.0 km	MPC · JPL
334560	2002 TW_{18}	—	October 2, 2002	Socorro	LINEAR	·	1.4 km	MPC · JPL
334561	2002 TZ_{24}	—	October 2, 2002	Socorro	LINEAR	·	880 m	MPC · JPL
334562	2002 TM_{53}	—	October 2, 2002	Socorro	LINEAR	TIR	4.0 km	MPC · JPL
334563	2002 TV_{59}	—	October 4, 2002	Socorro	LINEAR	PHO	1.1 km	MPC · JPL
334564	2002 TC_{62}	—	October 3, 2002	Campo Imperatore	CINEOS	·	980 m	MPC · JPL
334565	2002 TE_{63}	—	October 3, 2002	Campo Imperatore	CINEOS	·	840 m	MPC · JPL
334566	2002 TS_{71}	—	October 3, 2002	Palomar	NEAT	·	920 m	MPC · JPL
334567	2002 TE_{76}	—	October 1, 2002	Anderson Mesa	LONEOS	·	820 m	MPC · JPL
334568	2002 TO_{88}	—	October 3, 2002	Palomar	NEAT	EOS	2.7 km	MPC · JPL
334569	2002 TH_{89}	—	October 3, 2002	Palomar	NEAT	·	1.4 km	MPC · JPL
334570	2002 TY_{95}	—	October 3, 2002	Palomar	NEAT	·	840 m	MPC · JPL
334571	2002 TK_{100}	—	October 4, 2002	Socorro	LINEAR	·	2.3 km	MPC · JPL
334572	2002 TX_{101}	—	October 4, 2002	Socorro	LINEAR	·	900 m	MPC · JPL
334573	2002 TC_{102}	—	October 4, 2002	Socorro	LINEAR	·	2.1 km	MPC · JPL
334574	2002 TA_{105}	—	October 1, 2002	Anderson Mesa	LONEOS	·	2.0 km	MPC · JPL
334575	2002 TK_{105}	—	October 4, 2002	Anderson Mesa	LONEOS	·	3.8 km	MPC · JPL
334576	2002 TR_{106}	—	October 4, 2002	Palomar	NEAT	LIX	3.6 km	MPC · JPL
334577	2002 TE_{113}	—	October 3, 2002	Palomar	NEAT	EOS	2.8 km	MPC · JPL
334578	2002 TR_{117}	—	October 3, 2002	Palomar	NEAT	TIR	4.0 km	MPC · JPL
334579	2002 TU_{117}	—	October 3, 2002	Palomar	NEAT	·	1.2 km	MPC · JPL
334580	2002 TF_{122}	—	October 3, 2002	Campo Imperatore	CINEOS	·	3.1 km	MPC · JPL
334581	2002 TR_{122}	—	October 4, 2002	Palomar	NEAT	EOS	2.6 km	MPC · JPL
334582	2002 TV_{123}	—	October 4, 2002	Palomar	NEAT	EOS	2.5 km	MPC · JPL
334583	2002 TO_{127}	—	October 4, 2002	Palomar	NEAT	·	970 m	MPC · JPL
334584	2002 TU_{133}	—	October 4, 2002	Anderson Mesa	LONEOS	·	3.0 km	MPC · JPL
334585	2002 TJ_{155}	—	October 5, 2002	Palomar	NEAT	·	2.4 km	MPC · JPL
334586	2002 TL_{155}	—	October 5, 2002	Socorro	LINEAR	·	2.5 km	MPC · JPL
334587	2002 TA_{168}	—	October 3, 2002	Palomar	NEAT	·	4.9 km	MPC · JPL
334588	2002 TK_{182}	—	October 4, 2002	Palomar	NEAT	EOS	2.6 km	MPC · JPL
334589	2002 TH_{184}	—	September 6, 2002	Socorro	LINEAR	·	3.6 km	MPC · JPL
334590	2002 TQ_{194}	—	October 3, 2002	Socorro	LINEAR	·	3.2 km	MPC · JPL
334591	2002 TP_{207}	—	October 4, 2002	Socorro	LINEAR	·	3.1 km	MPC · JPL
334592	2002 TW_{210}	—	October 7, 2002	Socorro	LINEAR	·	790 m	MPC · JPL
334593	2002 TT_{219}	—	October 5, 2002	Socorro	LINEAR	·	3.2 km	MPC · JPL
334594	2002 TS_{233}	—	October 6, 2002	Socorro	LINEAR	·	3.3 km	MPC · JPL
334595	2002 TV_{233}	—	October 6, 2002	Socorro	LINEAR	·	2.9 km	MPC · JPL
334596	2002 TE_{244}	—	October 10, 2002	Palomar	NEAT	·	2.6 km	MPC · JPL
334597	2002 TZ_{253}	—	October 9, 2002	Socorro	LINEAR	·	650 m	MPC · JPL
334598	2002 TC_{269}	—	October 9, 2002	Socorro	LINEAR	EOS	3.1 km	MPC · JPL
334599	2002 TH_{276}	—	October 9, 2002	Socorro	LINEAR	·	990 m	MPC · JPL
334600	2002 TL_{276}	—	October 9, 2002	Socorro	LINEAR	·	750 m	MPC · JPL

== 334601–334700 ==
back to top

Designation			Discovery			Properties		Ref
Permanent	Provisional	Named after	Date	Site	Discoverer(s)	Category	Diam.	Ref
334601	2002 TY_{278}	—	October 10, 2002	Socorro	LINEAR	·	2.4 km	MPC · JPL
334602	2002 TK_{310}	—	October 4, 2002	Apache Point	SDSS	·	2.4 km	MPC · JPL
334603	2002 TG_{312}	—	October 4, 2002	Apache Point	SDSS	(895)	4.9 km	MPC · JPL
334604	2002 TE_{314}	—	October 4, 2002	Apache Point	SDSS	·	5.1 km	MPC · JPL
334605	2002 TH_{314}	—	October 4, 2002	Apache Point	SDSS	PHO	1.2 km	MPC · JPL
334606	2002 TZ_{331}	—	October 5, 2002	Apache Point	SDSS	·	720 m	MPC · JPL
334607	2002 TA_{349}	—	October 5, 2002	Apache Point	SDSS	·	3.3 km	MPC · JPL
334608	2002 TK_{361}	—	October 10, 2002	Apache Point	SDSS	·	1.5 km	MPC · JPL
334609	2002 TO_{370}	—	October 10, 2002	Apache Point	SDSS	·	4.2 km	MPC · JPL
334610	2002 TG_{376}	—	October 3, 2002	Socorro	LINEAR	·	980 m	MPC · JPL
334611	2002 UO_{2}	—	October 28, 2002	Socorro	LINEAR	PHO	1.5 km	MPC · JPL
334612	2002 UX_{11}	—	October 30, 2002	Socorro	LINEAR	PHO	1.5 km	MPC · JPL
334613	2002 UD_{24}	—	October 29, 2002	Kitt Peak	Spacewatch	·	2.3 km	MPC · JPL
334614	2002 UG_{45}	—	October 31, 2002	Socorro	LINEAR	·	1.9 km	MPC · JPL
334615	2002 UT_{57}	—	October 29, 2002	Apache Point	SDSS	EOS	1.9 km	MPC · JPL
334616	2002 UO_{58}	—	October 29, 2002	Apache Point	SDSS	·	690 m	MPC · JPL
334617	2002 UU_{64}	—	October 30, 2002	Apache Point	SDSS	·	740 m	MPC · JPL
334618	2002 UY_{67}	—	October 30, 2002	Apache Point	SDSS	·	4.1 km	MPC · JPL
334619	2002 UA_{73}	—	October 30, 2002	Kvistaberg	Uppsala-DLR Asteroid Survey	·	2.7 km	MPC · JPL
334620	2002 UU_{78}	—	October 28, 2002	Palomar	NEAT	EOS	2.1 km	MPC · JPL
334621	2002 VE_{3}	—	November 1, 2002	Palomar	NEAT	·	6.1 km	MPC · JPL
334622	2002 VT_{3}	—	November 1, 2002	Palomar	NEAT	·	870 m	MPC · JPL
334623	2002 VZ_{3}	—	November 1, 2002	Palomar	NEAT	·	3.4 km	MPC · JPL
334624	2002 VY_{9}	—	November 1, 2002	Palomar	NEAT	·	940 m	MPC · JPL
334625	2002 VL_{15}	—	November 6, 2002	Socorro	LINEAR	·	2.3 km	MPC · JPL
334626	2002 VF_{39}	—	November 5, 2002	Socorro	LINEAR	·	840 m	MPC · JPL
334627	2002 VA_{67}	—	November 6, 2002	Socorro	LINEAR	·	1.1 km	MPC · JPL
334628	2002 VV_{76}	—	November 7, 2002	Socorro	LINEAR	·	1.7 km	MPC · JPL
334629	2002 VU_{78}	—	November 7, 2002	Socorro	LINEAR	·	2.3 km	MPC · JPL
334630	2002 VE_{84}	—	November 7, 2002	Socorro	LINEAR	PHO	2.0 km	MPC · JPL
334631	2002 VU_{99}	—	November 13, 2002	Socorro	LINEAR	PHO	1.6 km	MPC · JPL
334632	2002 VC_{105}	—	November 12, 2002	Socorro	LINEAR	·	780 m	MPC · JPL
334633	2002 VX_{108}	—	November 12, 2002	Socorro	LINEAR	·	2.9 km	MPC · JPL
334634	2002 VE_{111}	—	November 13, 2002	Socorro	LINEAR	·	3.3 km	MPC · JPL
334635	2002 VZ_{117}	—	November 13, 2002	Socorro	LINEAR	T_{j} (2.93)	3.8 km	MPC · JPL
334636	2002 VH_{118}	—	November 14, 2002	Socorro	LINEAR	·	1.0 km	MPC · JPL
334637	2002 VY_{119}	—	November 12, 2002	Socorro	LINEAR	·	800 m	MPC · JPL
334638	2002 VP_{126}	—	November 12, 2002	Palomar	NEAT	·	1.0 km	MPC · JPL
334639	2002 VA_{132}	—	November 5, 2002	Mount Nyukasa	National Aerospace Laboratory of Japan	·	3.9 km	MPC · JPL
334640	2002 VE_{139}	—	November 13, 2002	Palomar	NEAT	·	4.0 km	MPC · JPL
334641	2002 VY_{139}	—	November 1, 2002	Palomar	NEAT	·	3.1 km	MPC · JPL
334642	2002 VG_{143}	—	November 5, 2002	Palomar	NEAT	·	2.2 km	MPC · JPL
334643	2002 WF_{1}	—	November 23, 2002	Palomar	NEAT	·	3.1 km	MPC · JPL
334644	2002 WD_{3}	—	November 24, 2002	Palomar	NEAT	·	3.4 km	MPC · JPL
334645	2002 WT_{12}	—	November 27, 2002	Anderson Mesa	LONEOS	·	3.1 km	MPC · JPL
334646	2002 WH_{21}	—	November 16, 2002	Palomar	NEAT	·	2.8 km	MPC · JPL
334647	2002 WL_{26}	—	November 23, 2002	Palomar	NEAT	·	670 m	MPC · JPL
334648	2002 XE_{12}	—	December 3, 2002	Palomar	NEAT	·	3.4 km	MPC · JPL
334649	2002 XM_{17}	—	December 5, 2002	Socorro	LINEAR	·	3.0 km	MPC · JPL
334650	2002 XX_{20}	—	December 2, 2002	Socorro	LINEAR	·	6.4 km	MPC · JPL
334651	2002 XY_{26}	—	December 5, 2002	Anderson Mesa	LONEOS	·	2.8 km	MPC · JPL
334652	2002 XV_{30}	—	December 6, 2002	Socorro	LINEAR	H	710 m	MPC · JPL
334653	2002 XP_{32}	—	December 6, 2002	Socorro	LINEAR	·	920 m	MPC · JPL
334654	2002 XT_{44}	—	December 7, 2002	Socorro	LINEAR	V	810 m	MPC · JPL
334655	2002 XN_{46}	—	December 7, 2002	Socorro	LINEAR	·	1.5 km	MPC · JPL
334656	2002 XT_{46}	—	December 7, 2002	Socorro	LINEAR	·	2.1 km	MPC · JPL
334657	2002 XO_{49}	—	December 10, 2002	Socorro	LINEAR	·	980 m	MPC · JPL
334658	2002 XL_{53}	—	December 10, 2002	Palomar	NEAT	·	780 m	MPC · JPL
334659	2002 XG_{55}	—	December 10, 2002	Palomar	NEAT	·	820 m	MPC · JPL
334660	2002 XC_{59}	—	December 11, 2002	Socorro	LINEAR	H	800 m	MPC · JPL
334661	2002 XB_{69}	—	December 13, 2002	Socorro	LINEAR	PHO	1.4 km	MPC · JPL
334662	2002 XX_{78}	—	December 11, 2002	Socorro	LINEAR	·	1.7 km	MPC · JPL
334663	2002 XR_{92}	—	November 7, 2002	Kitt Peak	Spacewatch	·	760 m	MPC · JPL
334664	2002 XQ_{97}	—	December 5, 2002	Socorro	LINEAR	·	1.1 km	MPC · JPL
334665	2002 XO_{103}	—	December 5, 2002	Socorro	LINEAR	·	1.4 km	MPC · JPL
334666	2002 XY_{106}	—	December 5, 2002	Socorro	LINEAR	·	3.3 km	MPC · JPL
334667	2002 XS_{110}	—	December 6, 2002	Socorro	LINEAR	·	4.6 km	MPC · JPL
334668	2002 YE_{10}	—	December 31, 2002	Socorro	LINEAR	·	3.1 km	MPC · JPL
334669	2002 YE_{17}	—	December 31, 2002	Socorro	LINEAR	·	2.3 km	MPC · JPL
334670	2002 YL_{28}	—	December 31, 2002	Socorro	LINEAR	·	1.5 km	MPC · JPL
334671	2002 YS_{32}	—	December 27, 2002	Palomar	NEAT	·	4.8 km	MPC · JPL
334672	2003 AV_{2}	—	January 1, 2003	Socorro	LINEAR	H	890 m	MPC · JPL
334673	2003 AL_{18}	—	January 7, 2003	Socorro	LINEAR	APO +1km	570 m	MPC · JPL
334674	2003 AO_{29}	—	January 4, 2003	Socorro	LINEAR	·	3.2 km	MPC · JPL
334675	2003 AG_{57}	—	January 5, 2003	Socorro	LINEAR	·	1.9 km	MPC · JPL
334676	2003 AR_{61}	—	January 7, 2003	Socorro	LINEAR	·	2.4 km	MPC · JPL
334677	2003 AM_{64}	—	January 7, 2003	Socorro	LINEAR	H	720 m	MPC · JPL
334678	2003 AJ_{76}	—	January 10, 2003	Socorro	LINEAR	·	4.9 km	MPC · JPL
334679	2003 AP_{79}	—	January 11, 2003	Kitt Peak	Spacewatch	·	740 m	MPC · JPL
334680	2003 BF_{3}	—	January 24, 2003	La Silla	A. Boattini, H. Scholl	·	1.3 km	MPC · JPL
334681	2003 BO_{6}	—	January 24, 2003	Palomar	NEAT	·	3.9 km	MPC · JPL
334682	2003 BR_{12}	—	January 26, 2003	Palomar	NEAT	THB	4.2 km	MPC · JPL
334683	2003 BX_{14}	—	January 26, 2003	Haleakala	NEAT	·	1.2 km	MPC · JPL
334684	2003 BR_{28}	—	January 26, 2003	Haleakala	NEAT	H	740 m	MPC · JPL
334685	2003 BV_{37}	—	December 31, 2002	Socorro	LINEAR	H	650 m	MPC · JPL
334686	2003 BJ_{46}	—	January 28, 2003	Socorro	LINEAR	H	770 m	MPC · JPL
334687	2003 BO_{46}	—	January 30, 2003	Socorro	LINEAR	T_{j} (2.94)	5.5 km	MPC · JPL
334688	2003 BT_{49}	—	December 31, 2002	Socorro	LINEAR	H	660 m	MPC · JPL
334689	2003 BN_{50}	—	January 27, 2003	Socorro	LINEAR	·	1.2 km	MPC · JPL
334690	2003 BG_{52}	—	January 27, 2003	Socorro	LINEAR	H	650 m	MPC · JPL
334691	2003 BB_{59}	—	January 27, 2003	Socorro	LINEAR	·	1.4 km	MPC · JPL
334692	2003 BY_{79}	—	January 31, 2003	Socorro	LINEAR	H	960 m	MPC · JPL
334693	2003 BW_{86}	—	January 26, 2003	Kitt Peak	Spacewatch	MAS	960 m	MPC · JPL
334694	2003 BY_{86}	—	January 26, 2003	Kitt Peak	Spacewatch	·	930 m	MPC · JPL
334695	2003 CW_{15}	—	February 6, 2003	Bisei SG Center	BATTeRS	·	6.2 km	MPC · JPL
334696	2003 DW_{1}	—	February 21, 2003	Palomar	NEAT	·	1.3 km	MPC · JPL
334697	2003 DX_{7}	—	February 23, 2003	Las Cruces	Dixon, D. S.	·	1.4 km	MPC · JPL
334698	2003 EZ_{4}	—	March 7, 2003	St. Véran	St. Veran	H	680 m	MPC · JPL
334699	2003 EY_{17}	—	March 6, 2003	Anderson Mesa	LONEOS	·	2.5 km	MPC · JPL
334700	2003 ET_{31}	—	March 7, 2003	Socorro	LINEAR	·	3.2 km	MPC · JPL

== 334701–334800 ==
back to top

Designation			Discovery			Properties		Ref
Permanent	Provisional	Named after	Date	Site	Discoverer(s)	Category	Diam.	Ref
334701	2003 EX_{36}	—	March 8, 2003	Anderson Mesa	LONEOS	·	1.9 km	MPC · JPL
334702	2003 EN_{39}	—	March 8, 2003	Socorro	LINEAR	·	1.4 km	MPC · JPL
334703	2003 EN_{43}	—	March 8, 2003	Anderson Mesa	LONEOS	T_{j} (2.92)	3.4 km	MPC · JPL
334704	2003 FM_{6}	—	March 26, 2003	Kleť	M. Tichý, Kočer, M.	BAR	1.4 km	MPC · JPL
334705	2003 FS_{17}	—	March 24, 2003	Kitt Peak	Spacewatch	·	860 m	MPC · JPL
334706	2003 FW_{30}	—	March 30, 2003	Socorro	LINEAR	·	1.9 km	MPC · JPL
334707	2003 FH_{45}	—	March 24, 2003	Kitt Peak	Spacewatch	fast	1.8 km	MPC · JPL
334708	2003 FT_{61}	—	March 26, 2003	Palomar	NEAT	·	1.6 km	MPC · JPL
334709	2003 FS_{100}	—	March 31, 2003	Anderson Mesa	LONEOS	·	850 m	MPC · JPL
334710	2003 FG_{132}	—	March 26, 2003	Kitt Peak	Spacewatch	·	1.3 km	MPC · JPL
334711	2003 FQ_{132}	—	March 24, 2003	Kitt Peak	Spacewatch	·	1.7 km	MPC · JPL
334712	2003 GW_{6}	—	April 2, 2003	Haleakala	NEAT	·	1.7 km	MPC · JPL
334713	2003 GL_{34}	—	April 5, 2003	Haleakala	NEAT	·	1.5 km	MPC · JPL
334714	2003 GM_{34}	—	April 6, 2003	Socorro	LINEAR	·	1.6 km	MPC · JPL
334715	2003 GN_{41}	—	April 9, 2003	Palomar	NEAT	·	1.3 km	MPC · JPL
334716	2003 GC_{48}	—	April 9, 2003	Palomar	NEAT	·	1.8 km	MPC · JPL
334717	2003 GV_{49}	—	April 10, 2003	Kitt Peak	Spacewatch	·	1.2 km	MPC · JPL
334718	2003 GY_{53}	—	April 6, 2003	Kitt Peak	Spacewatch	V	750 m	MPC · JPL
334719	2003 GP_{56}	—	April 11, 2003	Kitt Peak	Spacewatch	·	2.8 km	MPC · JPL
334720	2003 JQ_{3}	—	May 2, 2003	Kitt Peak	Spacewatch	·	2.8 km	MPC · JPL
334721	2003 JQ_{9}	—	May 3, 2003	Kitt Peak	Spacewatch	DOR	2.5 km	MPC · JPL
334722	2003 JY_{13}	—	May 5, 2003	Socorro	LINEAR	·	2.1 km	MPC · JPL
334723	2003 KZ_{3}	—	May 23, 2003	Reedy Creek	J. Broughton	·	1.9 km	MPC · JPL
334724	2003 KG_{4}	—	May 25, 2003	Kitt Peak	Spacewatch	·	3.2 km	MPC · JPL
334725	2003 KN_{5}	—	May 22, 2003	Anderson Mesa	LONEOS	·	2.1 km	MPC · JPL
334726	2003 KT_{7}	—	May 25, 2003	Kitt Peak	Spacewatch	·	2.0 km	MPC · JPL
334727	2003 KL_{17}	—	May 26, 2003	Haleakala	NEAT	·	1.9 km	MPC · JPL
334728	2003 KR_{17}	—	May 27, 2003	Kitt Peak	Spacewatch	PHO	1.1 km	MPC · JPL
334729	2003 MP_{6}	—	June 26, 2003	Anderson Mesa	LONEOS	·	2.9 km	MPC · JPL
334730	2003 NN_{10}	—	July 3, 2003	Kitt Peak	Spacewatch	·	2.5 km	MPC · JPL
334731	2003 OH_{7}	—	July 24, 2003	Campo Imperatore	CINEOS	·	1.6 km	MPC · JPL
334732	2003 OZ_{11}	—	July 22, 2003	Palomar	NEAT	·	2.5 km	MPC · JPL
334733	2003 OY_{13}	—	July 26, 2003	Palomar	NEAT	·	2.5 km	MPC · JPL
334734	2003 OM_{15}	—	July 23, 2003	Palomar	NEAT	EUN	1.8 km	MPC · JPL
334735	2003 OM_{16}	—	July 26, 2003	Palomar	NEAT	EUN	1.5 km	MPC · JPL
334736	2003 OJ_{20}	—	July 31, 2003	Haleakala	NEAT	·	2.5 km	MPC · JPL
334737	2003 OK_{20}	—	July 29, 2003	Haleakala	NEAT	JUN	1.2 km	MPC · JPL
334738	2003 OA_{26}	—	July 24, 2003	Palomar	NEAT	·	1.8 km	MPC · JPL
334739	2003 OV_{30}	—	July 24, 2003	Palomar	NEAT	EUN	1.5 km	MPC · JPL
334740	2003 PT_{5}	—	August 1, 2003	Socorro	LINEAR	·	2.2 km	MPC · JPL
334741	2003 PW_{6}	—	August 1, 2003	Socorro	LINEAR	·	1.3 km	MPC · JPL
334742	2003 QU_{25}	—	August 22, 2003	Palomar	NEAT	NEM	3.0 km	MPC · JPL
334743	2003 QO_{32}	—	August 21, 2003	Palomar	NEAT	·	2.0 km	MPC · JPL
334744	2003 QO_{33}	—	August 22, 2003	Palomar	NEAT	TIN	1.6 km	MPC · JPL
334745	2003 QR_{39}	—	August 22, 2003	Socorro	LINEAR	·	2.7 km	MPC · JPL
334746	2003 QF_{44}	—	August 22, 2003	Haleakala	NEAT	·	2.9 km	MPC · JPL
334747	2003 QY_{46}	—	August 24, 2003	Socorro	LINEAR	·	2.7 km	MPC · JPL
334748	2003 QV_{47}	—	August 20, 2003	Palomar	NEAT	·	3.0 km	MPC · JPL
334749	2003 QB_{50}	—	August 22, 2003	Palomar	NEAT	DOR	2.4 km	MPC · JPL
334750	2003 QB_{74}	—	August 24, 2003	Socorro	LINEAR	·	2.7 km	MPC · JPL
334751	2003 QO_{88}	—	August 25, 2003	Socorro	LINEAR	·	3.1 km	MPC · JPL
334752	2003 QV_{104}	—	August 29, 2003	Haleakala	NEAT	·	3.0 km	MPC · JPL
334753	2003 RY	—	September 1, 2003	Socorro	LINEAR	EUN	2.2 km	MPC · JPL
334754	2003 RH_{2}	—	September 3, 2003	Reedy Creek	J. Broughton	·	2.1 km	MPC · JPL
334755	2003 RJ_{7}	—	September 5, 2003	Campo Imperatore	CINEOS	GEF	1.7 km	MPC · JPL
334756 Leövey	2003 RP_{7}	Leövey	September 4, 2003	Piszkéstető	K. Sárneczky, B. Sipőcz	·	2.2 km	MPC · JPL
334757	2003 RD_{9}	—	September 2, 2003	Socorro	LINEAR	JUN	2.0 km	MPC · JPL
334758	2003 RP_{14}	—	September 15, 2003	Palomar	NEAT	·	2.4 km	MPC · JPL
334759	2003 RJ_{27}	—	September 2, 2003	Socorro	LINEAR	·	1.3 km	MPC · JPL
334760	2003 ST_{12}	—	September 16, 2003	Kitt Peak	Spacewatch	(5)	1.0 km	MPC · JPL
334761	2003 ST_{16}	—	September 17, 2003	Kitt Peak	Spacewatch	·	2.0 km	MPC · JPL
334762	2003 SM_{48}	—	September 18, 2003	Palomar	NEAT	·	2.7 km	MPC · JPL
334763	2003 SQ_{50}	—	September 18, 2003	Palomar	NEAT	·	3.1 km	MPC · JPL
334764	2003 SA_{59}	—	September 17, 2003	Anderson Mesa	LONEOS	·	2.8 km	MPC · JPL
334765	2003 SB_{64}	—	September 17, 2003	Campo Imperatore	CINEOS	·	2.1 km	MPC · JPL
334766	2003 SC_{64}	—	September 17, 2003	Campo Imperatore	CINEOS	·	2.7 km	MPC · JPL
334767	2003 SF_{71}	—	September 18, 2003	Kitt Peak	Spacewatch	·	2.4 km	MPC · JPL
334768	2003 SR_{76}	—	September 18, 2003	Siding Spring	R. H. McNaught	·	2.9 km	MPC · JPL
334769	2003 ST_{79}	—	September 19, 2003	Kitt Peak	Spacewatch	GEF	1.3 km	MPC · JPL
334770	2003 SF_{80}	—	September 19, 2003	Haleakala	NEAT	·	3.1 km	MPC · JPL
334771	2003 SK_{82}	—	September 18, 2003	Socorro	LINEAR	·	1.6 km	MPC · JPL
334772	2003 SQ_{89}	—	September 18, 2003	Palomar	NEAT	TIN	1.7 km	MPC · JPL
334773	2003 SR_{96}	—	September 19, 2003	Palomar	NEAT	·	3.4 km	MPC · JPL
334774	2003 SY_{102}	—	September 20, 2003	Socorro	LINEAR	·	1.9 km	MPC · JPL
334775	2003 SY_{113}	—	September 16, 2003	Anderson Mesa	LONEOS	GEF	1.4 km	MPC · JPL
334776	2003 SG_{128}	—	September 20, 2003	Socorro	LINEAR	615	1.9 km	MPC · JPL
334777	2003 SR_{133}	—	September 18, 2003	Palomar	NEAT	·	2.3 km	MPC · JPL
334778	2003 SM_{134}	—	September 18, 2003	Palomar	NEAT	WAT	2.2 km	MPC · JPL
334779	2003 SD_{138}	—	September 22, 2003	Palomar	NEAT	·	4.2 km	MPC · JPL
334780	2003 ST_{138}	—	September 20, 2003	Palomar	NEAT	·	3.5 km	MPC · JPL
334781	2003 SD_{139}	—	September 18, 2003	Kitt Peak	Spacewatch	·	3.2 km	MPC · JPL
334782	2003 SE_{147}	—	September 20, 2003	Palomar	NEAT	·	3.0 km	MPC · JPL
334783	2003 SG_{151}	—	September 17, 2003	Socorro	LINEAR	·	3.4 km	MPC · JPL
334784	2003 SP_{153}	—	September 19, 2003	Anderson Mesa	LONEOS	·	3.9 km	MPC · JPL
334785	2003 SY_{156}	—	September 19, 2003	Anderson Mesa	LONEOS	·	2.5 km	MPC · JPL
334786	2003 SC_{161}	—	September 17, 2003	Palomar	NEAT	·	2.8 km	MPC · JPL
334787	2003 SX_{163}	—	September 20, 2003	Anderson Mesa	LONEOS	·	720 m	MPC · JPL
334788	2003 SZ_{167}	—	September 23, 2003	Haleakala	NEAT	EUN	1.5 km	MPC · JPL
334789	2003 SW_{169}	—	September 23, 2003	Haleakala	NEAT	NYS	1.4 km	MPC · JPL
334790	2003 SS_{172}	—	September 18, 2003	Socorro	LINEAR	·	2.8 km	MPC · JPL
334791	2003 SF_{174}	—	September 18, 2003	Palomar	NEAT	·	2.7 km	MPC · JPL
334792	2003 SG_{174}	—	September 18, 2003	Kitt Peak	Spacewatch	PAD	1.8 km	MPC · JPL
334793	2003 SF_{175}	—	September 18, 2003	Kitt Peak	Spacewatch	·	1.5 km	MPC · JPL
334794	2003 SJ_{177}	—	September 18, 2003	Palomar	NEAT	·	2.5 km	MPC · JPL
334795	2003 SK_{185}	—	September 22, 2003	Anderson Mesa	LONEOS	·	2.3 km	MPC · JPL
334796	2003 SG_{188}	—	September 22, 2003	Socorro	LINEAR	·	2.7 km	MPC · JPL
334797	2003 ST_{191}	—	September 19, 2003	Palomar	NEAT	GEF	1.4 km	MPC · JPL
334798	2003 SJ_{194}	—	September 20, 2003	Kitt Peak	Spacewatch	·	2.3 km	MPC · JPL
334799	2003 SF_{199}	—	September 21, 2003	Anderson Mesa	LONEOS	·	3.0 km	MPC · JPL
334800	2003 SJ_{205}	—	September 23, 2003	Haleakala	NEAT	·	4.6 km	MPC · JPL

== 334801–334900 ==
back to top

Designation			Discovery			Properties		Ref
Permanent	Provisional	Named after	Date	Site	Discoverer(s)	Category	Diam.	Ref
334801	2003 SF_{210}	—	September 26, 2003	Socorro	LINEAR	AGN	1.5 km	MPC · JPL
334802	2003 SG_{224}	—	September 25, 2003	Bergisch Gladbach	W. Bickel	·	2.7 km	MPC · JPL
334803	2003 SF_{250}	—	September 26, 2003	Socorro	LINEAR	·	3.0 km	MPC · JPL
334804	2003 SB_{253}	—	September 27, 2003	Kitt Peak	Spacewatch	·	2.4 km	MPC · JPL
334805	2003 SC_{283}	—	September 20, 2003	Socorro	LINEAR	·	3.3 km	MPC · JPL
334806	2003 SR_{285}	—	September 20, 2003	Kitt Peak	Spacewatch	·	2.6 km	MPC · JPL
334807	2003 SK_{293}	—	September 27, 2003	Socorro	LINEAR	·	2.6 km	MPC · JPL
334808	2003 SK_{297}	—	September 18, 2003	Haleakala	NEAT	·	2.4 km	MPC · JPL
334809	2003 SM_{297}	—	September 18, 2003	Haleakala	NEAT	·	3.0 km	MPC · JPL
334810	2003 SS_{297}	—	September 18, 2003	Haleakala	NEAT	·	2.0 km	MPC · JPL
334811	2003 ST_{297}	—	September 18, 2003	Haleakala	NEAT	·	4.0 km	MPC · JPL
334812	2003 SK_{302}	—	September 17, 2003	Palomar	NEAT	·	2.7 km	MPC · JPL
334813	2003 SW_{307}	—	September 27, 2003	Socorro	LINEAR	·	2.1 km	MPC · JPL
334814	2003 SS_{310}	—	September 28, 2003	Haleakala	NEAT	EUN	1.7 km	MPC · JPL
334815	2003 SA_{312}	—	September 30, 2003	Socorro	LINEAR	·	1.4 km	MPC · JPL
334816	2003 SZ_{319}	—	September 16, 2003	Socorro	LINEAR	·	1.7 km	MPC · JPL
334817	2003 SL_{320}	—	September 17, 2003	Kitt Peak	Spacewatch	·	2.4 km	MPC · JPL
334818	2003 SA_{323}	—	September 16, 2003	Kitt Peak	Spacewatch	·	3.5 km	MPC · JPL
334819	2003 SR_{327}	—	September 19, 2003	Palomar	NEAT	·	2.3 km	MPC · JPL
334820	2003 SK_{328}	—	September 20, 2003	Socorro	LINEAR	·	2.4 km	MPC · JPL
334821	2003 SZ_{328}	—	September 21, 2003	Kitt Peak	Spacewatch	·	1.9 km	MPC · JPL
334822	2003 SP_{329}	—	September 22, 2003	Anderson Mesa	LONEOS	DOR	3.1 km	MPC · JPL
334823	2003 SB_{331}	—	September 26, 2003	Apache Point	SDSS	GEF	1.6 km	MPC · JPL
334824	2003 SN_{331}	—	September 26, 2003	Apache Point	SDSS	·	3.0 km	MPC · JPL
334825	2003 SF_{336}	—	September 26, 2003	Apache Point	SDSS	EOS	2.3 km	MPC · JPL
334826	2003 SN_{336}	—	September 27, 2003	Apache Point	SDSS	·	1.7 km	MPC · JPL
334827	2003 SD_{342}	—	September 17, 2003	Kitt Peak	Spacewatch	AGN	1.1 km	MPC · JPL
334828	2003 SF_{350}	—	September 18, 2003	Palomar	NEAT	·	2.0 km	MPC · JPL
334829	2003 SH_{393}	—	September 26, 2003	Apache Point	SDSS	·	2.5 km	MPC · JPL
334830	2003 SY_{394}	—	September 26, 2003	Apache Point	SDSS	·	1.3 km	MPC · JPL
334831	2003 SK_{398}	—	September 26, 2003	Apache Point	SDSS	·	2.1 km	MPC · JPL
334832	2003 SO_{399}	—	September 26, 2003	Apache Point	SDSS	·	3.7 km	MPC · JPL
334833	2003 SH_{411}	—	September 28, 2003	Apache Point	SDSS	·	1.7 km	MPC · JPL
334834	2003 SQ_{428}	—	September 18, 2003	Kitt Peak	Spacewatch	·	2.7 km	MPC · JPL
334835	2003 TN_{4}	—	October 1, 2003	Kitt Peak	Spacewatch	MRX	1.4 km	MPC · JPL
334836	2003 TK_{13}	—	October 15, 2003	Socorro	LINEAR	·	3.3 km	MPC · JPL
334837	2003 TT_{16}	—	October 14, 2003	Palomar	NEAT	·	2.3 km	MPC · JPL
334838	2003 TH_{23}	—	October 1, 2003	Kitt Peak	Spacewatch	·	2.1 km	MPC · JPL
334839	2003 TX_{23}	—	October 1, 2003	Kitt Peak	Spacewatch	·	2.0 km	MPC · JPL
334840	2003 TS_{25}	—	October 1, 2003	Kitt Peak	Spacewatch	·	1.9 km	MPC · JPL
334841	2003 TL_{26}	—	October 1, 2003	Anderson Mesa	LONEOS	·	2.3 km	MPC · JPL
334842	2003 TT_{52}	—	October 5, 2003	Kitt Peak	Spacewatch	·	2.0 km	MPC · JPL
334843	2003 TG_{56}	—	October 5, 2003	Kitt Peak	Spacewatch	MRX	1.3 km	MPC · JPL
334844	2003 UV_{3}	—	October 16, 2003	Kitt Peak	Spacewatch	AGN	1.3 km	MPC · JPL
334845	2003 UF_{28}	—	October 17, 2003	Kitt Peak	Spacewatch	·	2.3 km	MPC · JPL
334846	2003 UM_{30}	—	October 16, 2003	Kitt Peak	Spacewatch	V	820 m	MPC · JPL
334847	2003 US_{31}	—	October 16, 2003	Kitt Peak	Spacewatch	·	1.9 km	MPC · JPL
334848	2003 UN_{43}	—	October 17, 2003	Kitt Peak	Spacewatch	AST	1.8 km	MPC · JPL
334849	2003 US_{46}	—	October 18, 2003	Kitt Peak	Spacewatch	·	1.8 km	MPC · JPL
334850	2003 US_{49}	—	October 16, 2003	Palomar	NEAT	(18466)	3.1 km	MPC · JPL
334851	2003 UM_{50}	—	October 17, 2003	Kitt Peak	Spacewatch	·	3.4 km	MPC · JPL
334852	2003 UD_{55}	—	October 18, 2003	Palomar	NEAT	DOR	4.3 km	MPC · JPL
334853	2003 UZ_{73}	—	October 16, 2003	Palomar	NEAT	·	2.8 km	MPC · JPL
334854	2003 UR_{76}	—	October 17, 2003	Anderson Mesa	LONEOS	·	2.3 km	MPC · JPL
334855	2003 UN_{94}	—	October 18, 2003	Haleakala	NEAT	·	1.9 km	MPC · JPL
334856	2003 UE_{99}	—	October 19, 2003	Anderson Mesa	LONEOS	·	2.8 km	MPC · JPL
334857	2003 UB_{104}	—	October 17, 2003	Anderson Mesa	LONEOS	·	2.7 km	MPC · JPL
334858	2003 UV_{105}	—	October 18, 2003	Palomar	NEAT	·	3.3 km	MPC · JPL
334859	2003 UF_{112}	—	October 20, 2003	Socorro	LINEAR	·	2.7 km	MPC · JPL
334860	2003 UQ_{116}	—	October 21, 2003	Socorro	LINEAR	·	3.2 km	MPC · JPL
334861	2003 UN_{121}	—	October 19, 2003	Palomar	NEAT	WAT	2.8 km	MPC · JPL
334862	2003 UE_{124}	—	October 20, 2003	Socorro	LINEAR	·	2.9 km	MPC · JPL
334863	2003 UH_{131}	—	October 19, 2003	Palomar	NEAT	T_{j} (2.96) · HIL	6.0 km	MPC · JPL
334864	2003 UN_{138}	—	October 21, 2003	Socorro	LINEAR	·	2.5 km	MPC · JPL
334865	2003 UF_{142}	—	October 18, 2003	Anderson Mesa	LONEOS	BRA	1.7 km	MPC · JPL
334866	2003 UE_{143}	—	October 18, 2003	Anderson Mesa	LONEOS	·	2.3 km	MPC · JPL
334867	2003 UH_{150}	—	October 20, 2003	Kitt Peak	Spacewatch	·	2.1 km	MPC · JPL
334868	2003 UJ_{151}	—	October 21, 2003	Socorro	LINEAR	·	3.3 km	MPC · JPL
334869	2003 US_{152}	—	October 21, 2003	Socorro	LINEAR	·	3.0 km	MPC · JPL
334870	2003 UE_{179}	—	October 21, 2003	Socorro	LINEAR	·	2.4 km	MPC · JPL
334871	2003 UD_{194}	—	October 20, 2003	Socorro	LINEAR	·	2.7 km	MPC · JPL
334872	2003 UT_{194}	—	October 20, 2003	Kitt Peak	Spacewatch	HOF	2.7 km	MPC · JPL
334873	2003 UV_{201}	—	October 21, 2003	Kitt Peak	Spacewatch	·	4.0 km	MPC · JPL
334874	2003 UJ_{212}	—	October 23, 2003	Haleakala	NEAT	·	3.0 km	MPC · JPL
334875	2003 UJ_{226}	—	October 22, 2003	Kitt Peak	Spacewatch	·	2.5 km	MPC · JPL
334876	2003 UQ_{229}	—	October 23, 2003	Anderson Mesa	LONEOS	·	2.2 km	MPC · JPL
334877	2003 UV_{233}	—	October 24, 2003	Socorro	LINEAR	MRX	1.2 km	MPC · JPL
334878	2003 UQ_{239}	—	October 24, 2003	Socorro	LINEAR	GEF	1.7 km	MPC · JPL
334879	2003 UA_{260}	—	October 25, 2003	Anderson Mesa	LONEOS	·	4.8 km	MPC · JPL
334880	2003 UA_{290}	—	October 23, 2003	Kitt Peak	M. W. Buie	·	2.9 km	MPC · JPL
334881	2003 UE_{304}	—	October 17, 2003	Kitt Peak	Spacewatch	(5)	1.1 km	MPC · JPL
334882	2003 UF_{309}	—	October 19, 2003	Kitt Peak	Spacewatch	·	2.3 km	MPC · JPL
334883	2003 UN_{316}	—	October 24, 2003	Kitt Peak	M. W. Buie	·	1.8 km	MPC · JPL
334884	2003 UD_{318}	—	October 22, 2003	Apache Point	SDSS	·	2.1 km	MPC · JPL
334885	2003 UL_{323}	—	October 16, 2003	Kitt Peak	Spacewatch	·	2.1 km	MPC · JPL
334886	2003 UR_{323}	—	March 24, 2001	Kitt Peak	Spacewatch	AGN	1.7 km	MPC · JPL
334887	2003 UE_{328}	—	October 17, 2003	Apache Point	SDSS	·	2.1 km	MPC · JPL
334888	2003 UM_{348}	—	October 19, 2003	Apache Point	SDSS	·	2.1 km	MPC · JPL
334889	2003 UQ_{348}	—	October 19, 2003	Apache Point	SDSS	·	2.0 km	MPC · JPL
334890	2003 UM_{377}	—	October 22, 2003	Apache Point	SDSS	·	1.9 km	MPC · JPL
334891	2003 VR_{1}	—	November 2, 2003	Socorro	LINEAR	·	3.6 km	MPC · JPL
334892	2003 WH_{27}	—	November 16, 2003	Kitt Peak	Spacewatch	EOS	2.1 km	MPC · JPL
334893	2003 WT_{31}	—	November 18, 2003	Palomar	NEAT	·	2.2 km	MPC · JPL
334894	2003 WO_{42}	—	November 21, 2003	Catalina	CSS	(194)	2.1 km	MPC · JPL
334895	2003 WW_{45}	—	November 19, 2003	Socorro	LINEAR	H	790 m	MPC · JPL
334896	2003 WS_{65}	—	November 19, 2003	Kitt Peak	Spacewatch	·	2.8 km	MPC · JPL
334897	2003 WP_{66}	—	November 19, 2003	Kitt Peak	Spacewatch	·	2.5 km	MPC · JPL
334898	2003 WC_{72}	—	November 20, 2003	Socorro	LINEAR	·	4.5 km	MPC · JPL
334899	2003 WB_{78}	—	November 20, 2003	Kitt Peak	Spacewatch	·	1.9 km	MPC · JPL
334900	2003 WY_{89}	—	November 16, 2003	Kitt Peak	Spacewatch	·	3.0 km	MPC · JPL

== 334901–335000 ==
back to top

Designation			Discovery			Properties		Ref
Permanent	Provisional	Named after	Date	Site	Discoverer(s)	Category	Diam.	Ref
334901	2003 WG_{95}	—	November 19, 2003	Anderson Mesa	LONEOS	·	2.5 km	MPC · JPL
334902	2003 WU_{131}	—	November 22, 2003	Kitt Peak	Spacewatch	·	2.7 km	MPC · JPL
334903	2003 WO_{143}	—	November 19, 2003	Catalina	CSS	·	2.0 km	MPC · JPL
334904	2003 WL_{167}	—	November 19, 2003	Palomar	NEAT	fast?	2.3 km	MPC · JPL
334905	2003 WT_{174}	—	November 19, 2003	Palomar	NEAT	·	3.6 km	MPC · JPL
334906	2003 WP_{186}	—	November 23, 2003	Kitt Peak	M. W. Buie	·	2.2 km	MPC · JPL
334907	2003 XL_{5}	—	December 3, 2003	Anderson Mesa	LONEOS	·	3.6 km	MPC · JPL
334908	2003 XC_{7}	—	December 3, 2003	Socorro	LINEAR	·	1.8 km	MPC · JPL
334909	2003 XT_{43}	—	November 30, 2003	Kitt Peak	Spacewatch	V	660 m	MPC · JPL
334910	2003 YJ_{3}	—	December 19, 2003	Kingsnake	J. V. McClusky	·	3.7 km	MPC · JPL
334911	2003 YK_{8}	—	December 19, 2003	Socorro	LINEAR	H	680 m	MPC · JPL
334912	2003 YK_{11}	—	December 17, 2003	Socorro	LINEAR	·	1.1 km	MPC · JPL
334913	2003 YW_{11}	—	December 17, 2003	Socorro	LINEAR	·	4.3 km	MPC · JPL
334914	2003 YS_{12}	—	December 17, 2003	Anderson Mesa	LONEOS	EUP	5.9 km	MPC · JPL
334915	2003 YW_{32}	—	December 16, 2003	Kitt Peak	Spacewatch	GEF	1.8 km	MPC · JPL
334916	2003 YK_{39}	—	December 19, 2003	Kitt Peak	Spacewatch	·	650 m	MPC · JPL
334917	2003 YY_{43}	—	December 19, 2003	Kitt Peak	Spacewatch	·	3.4 km	MPC · JPL
334918	2003 YU_{88}	—	December 19, 2003	Kitt Peak	Spacewatch	·	2.1 km	MPC · JPL
334919	2003 YD_{92}	—	December 21, 2003	Socorro	LINEAR	·	2.3 km	MPC · JPL
334920	2003 YU_{114}	—	December 25, 2003	Haleakala	NEAT	·	2.3 km	MPC · JPL
334921	2003 YY_{115}	—	December 27, 2003	Kitt Peak	Spacewatch	·	2.1 km	MPC · JPL
334922	2003 YA_{124}	—	December 28, 2003	Socorro	LINEAR	·	3.8 km	MPC · JPL
334923	2003 YY_{132}	—	December 28, 2003	Socorro	LINEAR	·	3.9 km	MPC · JPL
334924	2003 YQ_{134}	—	December 28, 2003	Socorro	LINEAR	·	1.6 km	MPC · JPL
334925	2003 YP_{145}	—	December 28, 2003	Socorro	LINEAR	·	3.1 km	MPC · JPL
334926	2004 AO_{3}	—	January 14, 2004	Palomar	NEAT	·	3.9 km	MPC · JPL
334927	2004 AR_{22}	—	January 15, 2004	Kitt Peak	Spacewatch	·	2.1 km	MPC · JPL
334928	2004 AZ_{23}	—	January 15, 2004	Kitt Peak	Spacewatch	VER	3.3 km	MPC · JPL
334929	2004 BP_{4}	—	January 16, 2004	Palomar	NEAT	·	3.2 km	MPC · JPL
334930	2004 BD_{9}	—	January 17, 2004	Palomar	NEAT	·	2.9 km	MPC · JPL
334931	2004 BY_{30}	—	January 18, 2004	Palomar	NEAT	·	3.4 km	MPC · JPL
334932	2004 BD_{33}	—	January 19, 2004	Kitt Peak	Spacewatch	·	970 m	MPC · JPL
334933	2004 BB_{34}	—	January 19, 2004	Kitt Peak	Spacewatch	·	4.6 km	MPC · JPL
334934	2004 BB_{39}	—	January 21, 2004	Kitt Peak	Spacewatch	·	2.9 km	MPC · JPL
334935	2004 BG_{50}	—	January 21, 2004	Socorro	LINEAR	·	3.4 km	MPC · JPL
334936	2004 BX_{54}	—	January 22, 2004	Socorro	LINEAR	ADE	2.0 km	MPC · JPL
334937	2004 BE_{55}	—	January 22, 2004	Socorro	LINEAR	·	1.3 km	MPC · JPL
334938	2004 BL_{75}	—	January 22, 2004	Socorro	LINEAR	·	4.2 km	MPC · JPL
334939	2004 BU_{89}	—	January 23, 2004	Socorro	LINEAR	·	4.9 km	MPC · JPL
334940	2004 BC_{98}	—	January 27, 2004	Kitt Peak	Spacewatch	V	730 m	MPC · JPL
334941	2004 BF_{105}	—	January 24, 2004	Socorro	LINEAR	·	2.3 km	MPC · JPL
334942	2004 BG_{109}	—	January 28, 2004	Catalina	CSS	·	5.2 km	MPC · JPL
334943	2004 BX_{111}	—	January 23, 2004	Socorro	LINEAR	·	4.4 km	MPC · JPL
334944	2004 BU_{114}	—	January 29, 2004	Anderson Mesa	LONEOS	·	3.3 km	MPC · JPL
334945	2004 BK_{156}	—	January 28, 2004	Kitt Peak	Spacewatch	·	890 m	MPC · JPL
334946	2004 CC_{10}	—	February 11, 2004	Kitt Peak	Spacewatch	·	950 m	MPC · JPL
334947	2004 CB_{27}	—	February 11, 2004	Kitt Peak	Spacewatch	·	1.5 km	MPC · JPL
334948	2004 CD_{36}	—	February 11, 2004	Palomar	NEAT	·	3.5 km	MPC · JPL
334949	2004 CS_{43}	—	February 12, 2004	Kitt Peak	Spacewatch	·	3.5 km	MPC · JPL
334950	2004 CJ_{53}	—	February 11, 2004	Palomar	NEAT	·	3.8 km	MPC · JPL
334951	2004 CK_{71}	—	January 30, 2004	Kitt Peak	Spacewatch	·	920 m	MPC · JPL
334952	2004 CY_{75}	—	February 11, 2004	Kitt Peak	Spacewatch	·	3.3 km	MPC · JPL
334953	2004 CB_{90}	—	February 12, 2004	Kitt Peak	Spacewatch	EOS	2.8 km	MPC · JPL
334954	2004 CB_{104}	—	February 13, 2004	Palomar	NEAT	·	4.4 km	MPC · JPL
334955	2004 CY_{104}	—	February 13, 2004	Palomar	NEAT	·	490 m	MPC · JPL
334956	2004 CY_{107}	—	February 14, 2004	Kitt Peak	Spacewatch	PHO	1.0 km	MPC · JPL
334957	2004 CY_{109}	—	February 13, 2004	Kitt Peak	Spacewatch	PHO	3.1 km	MPC · JPL
334958	2004 CW_{111}	—	February 10, 2004	Palomar	NEAT	·	2.7 km	MPC · JPL
334959	2004 CN_{116}	—	February 11, 2004	Anderson Mesa	LONEOS	·	4.4 km	MPC · JPL
334960	2004 CD_{120}	—	February 12, 2004	Kitt Peak	Spacewatch	·	5.0 km	MPC · JPL
334961	2004 CP_{130}	—	February 13, 2004	Kitt Peak	Spacewatch	·	4.5 km	MPC · JPL
334962	2004 DT_{2}	—	February 16, 2004	Kitt Peak	Spacewatch	·	860 m	MPC · JPL
334963	2004 DU_{16}	—	February 18, 2004	Kitt Peak	Spacewatch	·	960 m	MPC · JPL
334964	2004 DS_{43}	—	February 23, 2004	Socorro	LINEAR	·	890 m	MPC · JPL
334965	2004 DY_{49}	—	February 22, 2004	Kitt Peak	Spacewatch	·	2.7 km	MPC · JPL
334966	2004 DK_{51}	—	February 23, 2004	Socorro	LINEAR	V	730 m	MPC · JPL
334967	2004 DE_{59}	—	February 23, 2004	Socorro	LINEAR	NYS	1.0 km	MPC · JPL
334968	2004 DY_{64}	—	February 18, 2004	Socorro	LINEAR	·	980 m	MPC · JPL
334969	2004 DY_{78}	—	February 16, 2004	Kitt Peak	Spacewatch	T_{j} (2.98)	5.4 km	MPC · JPL
334970	2004 EO_{5}	—	March 11, 2004	Palomar	NEAT	·	3.7 km	MPC · JPL
334971	2004 ED_{8}	—	March 13, 2004	Palomar	NEAT	ERI	1.7 km	MPC · JPL
334972	2004 EZ_{19}	—	March 14, 2004	Kitt Peak	Spacewatch	·	950 m	MPC · JPL
334973	2004 EM_{30}	—	March 15, 2004	Kitt Peak	Spacewatch	(1298)	3.3 km	MPC · JPL
334974	2004 EB_{34}	—	March 12, 2004	Palomar	NEAT	·	1.2 km	MPC · JPL
334975	2004 EL_{40}	—	March 15, 2004	Kitt Peak	Spacewatch	·	1.1 km	MPC · JPL
334976	2004 EO_{50}	—	March 14, 2004	Kitt Peak	Spacewatch	H	420 m	MPC · JPL
334977	2004 ED_{52}	—	March 15, 2004	Junk Bond	Junk Bond	·	1.6 km	MPC · JPL
334978	2004 EE_{80}	—	March 14, 2004	Socorro	LINEAR	·	4.5 km	MPC · JPL
334979	2004 EJ_{85}	—	March 15, 2004	Socorro	LINEAR	·	1.6 km	MPC · JPL
334980	2004 FV_{8}	—	March 16, 2004	Socorro	LINEAR	·	2.5 km	MPC · JPL
334981	2004 FL_{14}	—	March 16, 2004	Catalina	CSS	PHO	1.6 km	MPC · JPL
334982	2004 FM_{14}	—	March 16, 2004	Catalina	CSS	·	1.4 km	MPC · JPL
334983	2004 FD_{29}	—	March 27, 2004	Goodricke-Pigott	R. A. Tucker	·	1.6 km	MPC · JPL
334984	2004 FF_{34}	—	March 16, 2004	Socorro	LINEAR	·	970 m	MPC · JPL
334985	2004 FP_{49}	—	March 18, 2004	Socorro	LINEAR	·	830 m	MPC · JPL
334986	2004 FB_{50}	—	March 18, 2004	Socorro	LINEAR	NYS	1.1 km	MPC · JPL
334987	2004 FR_{55}	—	March 20, 2004	Socorro	LINEAR	·	800 m	MPC · JPL
334988	2004 FX_{67}	—	March 20, 2004	Socorro	LINEAR	·	1.5 km	MPC · JPL
334989	2004 FT_{89}	—	March 20, 2004	Socorro	LINEAR	·	960 m	MPC · JPL
334990	2004 FN_{92}	—	March 18, 2004	Socorro	LINEAR	·	750 m	MPC · JPL
334991	2004 FW_{96}	—	March 23, 2004	Socorro	LINEAR	·	4.6 km	MPC · JPL
334992	2004 FY_{111}	—	March 26, 2004	Socorro	LINEAR	·	2.7 km	MPC · JPL
334993	2004 FR_{134}	—	March 26, 2004	Kitt Peak	Spacewatch	·	4.0 km	MPC · JPL
334994	2004 FA_{135}	—	March 27, 2004	Kitt Peak	Spacewatch	·	4.0 km	MPC · JPL
334995	2004 FR_{135}	—	March 18, 2004	Socorro	LINEAR	URS	4.3 km	MPC · JPL
334996	2004 FD_{141}	—	March 27, 2004	Socorro	LINEAR	·	1.5 km	MPC · JPL
334997	2004 GA_{8}	—	April 12, 2004	Anderson Mesa	LONEOS	(2076) · fast	1.1 km	MPC · JPL
334998	2004 GB_{8}	—	April 12, 2004	Anderson Mesa	LONEOS	NYS	980 m	MPC · JPL
334999	2004 GP_{15}	—	April 14, 2004	Anderson Mesa	LONEOS	H	840 m	MPC · JPL
335000	2004 GW_{38}	—	April 15, 2004	Anderson Mesa	LONEOS	ERI	2.1 km	MPC · JPL

back to top

== See also ==
- Meanings of minor-planet names: 334001–335000
