= Meanings of minor-planet names: 333001–334000 =

As minor planet discoveries are confirmed, they are given a permanent number by the IAU's Minor Planet Center (MPC), and the discoverers can then submit names for them, following the IAU's naming conventions. The list below concerns those minor planets in the specified number-range that have received names, and explains the meanings of those names.

Official naming citations of newly named small Solar System bodies are approved and published in a bulletin by IAU's Working Group for Small Bodies Nomenclature (WGSBN). Before May 2021, citations were published in MPC's Minor Planet Circulars for many decades. Recent citations can also be found on the JPL Small-Body Database (SBDB). Until his death in 2016, German astronomer Lutz D. Schmadel compiled these citations into the Dictionary of Minor Planet Names (DMP) and regularly updated the collection.

Based on Paul Herget's The Names of the Minor Planets, Schmadel also researched the unclear origin of numerous asteroids, most of which had been named prior to World War II. This article incorporates text from this source, which is in the public domain: SBDB New namings may only be added to this list below after official publication as the preannouncement of names is condemned. The WGSBN publishes a comprehensive guideline for the naming rules of non-cometary small Solar System bodies.

== 333001–333100 ==
Named minor planet	Provisional	This minor planet was named for...	Ref · Catalog
333001 Calloway	2011 HB_{38}	Andrew Calloway (b. 1967), the Mission Operations Manager for the US OSIRIS-REx Asteroid Sample Return mission.	IAU · 333001
333003 Espiritu	2011 HP_{58}	Raymond Espiritu (b. 1971), an American software developer of the Altimetry Working Group data product pipeline for the OSIRIS-REx asteroid sample return mission.	IAU · 333003
333005 Haberle	2011 JV_{15}	Christopher Haberle (b. 1985), an American geologist.	IAU · 333005
333018 Devin	2011 QE_{28}	Devin Poland (b. 1986), an American engineer.	IAU · 333018
333029 Sallitt	2011 SK_{32}	Debbie Sallitt (b. 1967), the Financial Manager for the OSIRIS-Rex Mission.	IAU · 333029
333033 Yutakahashi	2011 SO_{66}	Yu Takahashi (b. 1986), a Japanese-American scientist.	IAU · 333033
333035 Pelgrift	2011 SX_{90}	John Pelgrift (b. 1994) worked on the navigation teams for the OSIRIS-REx Asteroid Sample Return Mission and the New Horizons Kuiper Extended Mission.	IAU · 333035
333036 Sahr	2011 SC_{91}	Eric Sahr (b. 1990), an Optical Navigation Engineer for the OSIRIS-REx Sample Return Mission.	IAU · 333036
333040 Dalehowell	2011 SF_{115}	Dale K. Howell (b. 1959), the Touch-and-Go Phase Lead for the OSIRIS-Rex Asteroid Sample Return Mission.	IAU · 333040
333043 Courtneymario	2011 SU_{129}	Courtney Mario (b. 1987), an American engineer.	IAU · 333043
333050 Olds	2011 SA_{174}	Ryan Olds (b. 1981), an American engineer.	IAU · 333050
333052 Skeen	2011 SQ_{185}	Michael Skeen (b. 1990), an American engineer.	IAU · 333052
333054 Bloomquist	2011 SK_{200}	Leif Bloomquist (b. 1973), a Canadian engineer.	IAU · 333054
333055 Liang	2011 SC_{223}	Jason Liang (b. 1988), a Canadian engineer.	IAU · 333055
333056 Bellamy	2011 SE_{226}	Kelly Scott Bellamy (b. 1965), the Mission Manager for the OSIRIS-REx Mission.	IAU · 333056
333057 Bowles	2011 SO_{234}	Neil Bowles (b. 1970), a British meteoriticist.	IAU · 333057
333059 Audi	2011 SG_{261}	Edward Audi (b. 1973), an American engineer.	IAU · 333059
333061 Joshuanelson	2011 TD_{13}	Joshua Nelson (b. 1985), an American engineer.	IAU · 333061
333065 Zeszut	2011 UX_{17}	Zoe Zeszut (b. 1993), an Operations Engineer for the OSIRIS-REx Asteroid Sample Return Mission	IAU · 333065
333076 Claudiamanzoni	2011 UL_{80}	Claudia Manzoni (b. 1967), an Italian stereo-image collaborator on the OSIRIS-REx Mission.	IAU · 333076
333079 Keara	2011 UP_{112}	Keara Burke (b. 1996) worked on the OSIRIS-REx Mission as a systems and data analyst engineer.	IAU · 333079
333081 Cutts	2011 UM_{122}	Jonathan Cutts (b. 1983), a Planning Specialist on the OSIRIS-REx mission.	IAU · 333081
333089 Dean	2011 UD_{175}	David Dean (b. 1980), an American programmer.	IAU · 333089
333096 Brittanyenos	2011 UC_{248}	Brittany Enos (b. 1994), the digital communications lead on the OSIRIS-REx mission .	IAU · 333096
333097 Andrewgardner	2011 UT_{248}	Andrew Gardner (b. 1979), an American computer programmer	IAU · 333097

== 333101–333200 ==
back to top

Named minor planet	Provisional	This minor planet was named for...	Ref · Catalog
333101 Lovelace	2011 UE_{298}	Brian Lovelace (b. 1993), an American software engineer	IAU · 333101
333106 Lujan	2011 UG_{311}	Michael N. Lujan (b. 1994), a program coordinator.	IAU · 333106
333107 McDonough	2011 US_{353}	Eva C. McDonough (b. 1966), the Database Administrator for the OSIRIS-REx Asteroid Sample Return Mission	IAU · 333107
333110 Lupe	2011 UZ_{384}	Guadalupe “Lupe” Cota Collins (1935–1989), the mother of Rosie Cope, an Executive Assistant for the OSIRIS-REx Asteroid Sample Return Mission.	IAU · 333110
333119 Sharonhelms	2011 WF_{7}	Sharon R. Helms (1962–2017), mother of Jacob and Olivia, a financial analyst at NASA supporting the OSIRIS-REx mission.	IAU · 333119
333120 Blum	2011 WN_{7}	Denise Blum (b. 1965), an American administrator.	IAU · 333120
333125 Maestas	2011 WT_{52}	Alexander J. Maestas (b. 1991) is an American systems engineer. He is a Real-Time Operator for the OSIRIS-REx Asteroid Sample Return Mission. Previously, Alexander has supported ground/space operations as a Systems/Radio-Frequency Engineer for several satellite programs as well as the Air Force Satellite Control Network.	IAU · 333125
333134 Alexandrahilbert	2011 WY_{123}	Alexandra Hilbert (b. 1991) is an American systems engineer. She was a Mission Operations Systems Engineer on the OSIRIS-REx mission from 2017 through 2019. During this time, Alexandra supported Science Phase operations development and led a variety of flight activities. She has also worked on the Juno, Lucy, and Human Landing System programs.	IAU · 333134
333138 Bellabrodbeck	2011 YW_{4}	Juliette Isabella “Bella” Brodbeck (b. 1999) is an American geospatial analyst specializing in the remote sensing of asteroid surfaces. She performed image-based hazard analyses of (101955) Bennu for the OSIRIS-REx mission and contributed to the NASAsponsored development of global image mosaics for (101955) Bennu and (433) Eros.	IAU · 333138
333139 Deguzman	2011 YM_{8}	Angelica Deguzman (b. 1995) is an American engineer who was a Guidance, Navigation, and Control Engineer for OSIRIS-REx. She also supports other Deep Space Exploration programs at Lockheed Martin such as InSight, Dragonfly, and Advanced Programs as a Guidance, Navigation, and Control engineer.	IAU · 333139
333146 Austin	2011 AH_{20}	Austin Fisher (b. 1980) is an American engineer. He was the Electrical Power Subsystem Lead for the OSIRIS-REx mission. Prior to this role Austin supported the development of OSIRIS-REx as the Electrical Systems Engineer during assembly, test, and integration.	IAU · 333146
333157 Buck	2012 BO_{78}	Beth Buck (b. 1967) is an American spacecraft program manager. She was the Program Manager for the Lockheed Martin Deep Space Exploration Mission Operations that includes OSIRIS-REx, MAVEN, InSight, Juno, Mars Reconnaissance Orbiter, Mars Odyssey and Hubble, and previously the Spitzer telescope.	IAU · 333157
333166 Brennen	2012 CF_{19}	Brennen D. Miller, American systems engineer for the OSIRIS-REx asteroid sample return mission.	IAU · 333166
333171 Chris	2012 CD_{51}	Christopher D. Norman, American member of the Guidance, Navigation, and Control team as well as a camera operations lead for the OSIRIS-REx Asteroid Sample Return Mission.	IAU · 333171
333172 Danielellis	2012 CR_{71}	Daniel R. Ellis (b. 1991) is the American contracts negotiator lead for the OSIRIS-REx Asteroid Sample Return Mission. He is the main customer interface for contractual matters, ensuring contract compliance as well as submitting and negotiating proposal efforts for current or future work to the program.	IAU · 333172
333175 Jaen	2012 DZ_{3}	Frank J. Jaen, American systems engineer on the OSIRIS-REx Asteroid Sample Return mission.	IAU · 333175
333176 Sierragonzales	2012 DW_{8}	Sierra A. Gonzales, American systems engineer for the OSIRIS-REx Asteroid Sample Return Mission.	IAU · 333176
333178 Sivaperuman	2012 DZ_{16}	Sivaperuman Muniyasamy, Indian aerospace engineer and Ph.D. candidate in Aerospace Engineering at the University of Arizona.	IAU · 333178
333183 Harishswabhash	2012 DS_{79}	Harish Vernekar, Indian aerospace researcher specializing in the design of satellite guidance, navigation, and control systems to study Near-Earth Objects and advance planetary defense strategies.	IAU · 333183
333184 Craft	2012 EU_{8}	Kathleen Craft, American planetary scientist.	IAU · 333184
333190 Matthewjones	2012 FZ_{57}	Matthew (Matt) Jones, American program manager.	IAU · 333190
333195 Norberto	2012 FV_{76}	Norberto Lopez, American research software engineer.	IAU · 333195

== 333201–333300 ==
back to top

Named minor planet	Provisional	This minor planet was named for...	Ref · Catalog
333205 Nair	2012 HA	Hari Nair, American research software engineer.	IAU · 333205
333207 Lilliannguyen	2012 HA_{4}	Lilian Nguyen, American research software engineer.	IAU · 333207
333210 Lunning	2012 HX_{14}	Nicole Lunning, American geologist, petrologist, planetary scientist and astromaterials sample curator.	IAU · 333210
333219 Rogerharrington	2012 HE_{38}	Roger S. Harrington, American geologist and meteorite thin section lab manager at NASA JSC.	IAU · 333219
333224 Alanarosejohnson	2012 HB_{40}	Alana Rose Johnson, U.S. Air Force veteran and senior communications specialist for the Planetary Science Division at NASA Headquarters.	IAU · 333224
333228 Mollywasser	2012 HW_{42}	Molly Wasser, American space science communicator and educator.	IAU · 333228
333230 Simkus	2012 HO_{47}	Danielle Simkus, Canadian researcher and astrobiologist.	IAU · 333230
333233 Duda	2012 HY_{48}	Lauren Duda, American aerospace communicator, world traveler, polyglot, musician, outdoor enthusiast, and stargazer.	IAU · 333233
333234 Michaelstarobin	2012 HQ_{49}	Michael A. Starobin, American writer, filmmaker, and producer.	IAU · 333234
333241 Chugg	2012 HF_{65}	Jason A. Chugg, American farmer, general contractor, and pilot.	IAU · 333241
333242 Ericthomasparker	2012 HG_{65}	Eric Thomas Parker, American analytical chemist who is a member of the sample analysis team for the OSIRIS-REx Asteroid Sample Return Mission.	IAU · 333242
333245 Peachey	2012 HA_{71}	James Peachey, American research software engineer.	IAU · 333245
333251 Jamesroberts	2012 JJ_{1}	James Roberts, American planetary scientist.	IAU · 333251
333253 Steele	2012 JE_{6}	Robert “Josh” Steele, American research software engineer.	IAU · 333253
333255 Mayorga	2012 JS_{8}	Laura Mayorga, American astronomer.	IAU · 333255
333259 Wayland	2012 JG_{15}	Wayland D. Connelly, American mechanical engineer who worked within the curation team of the OSIRIS-REx Asteroid Sample Return Mission.	IAU · 333259
333264 Gabriel	2012 JL_{22}	Gabriel Lugo, mechanical design engineer.	IAU · 333264
333267 Shekhtman	2012 JH_{32}	Svetlana Shekhtman, American science communicator.	IAU · 333267
333268 Frédséguin	2012 KO_{9}	Frédéric Séguin, Canadian analytical chemist.	IAU · 333268
333288 Markperry	1999 SU_{14}	Mark Perry, American planetary scientist. He played a key role in the planning and analysis of data from the OSIRIS-REx laser altimeter and constrained the strength of Bennu's surface materials through analysis of impact ejecta.	IAU · 333288

== 333301–333400 ==
back to top

Named minor planet	Provisional	This minor planet was named for...	Ref · Catalog
333373 Grahammiller	2002 NS_{75}	Graham R. Miller, American engineer.	IAU · 333373
333384 Huikang	2002 QC_{151}	Huikang Ma, American guidance, navigation, and control engineer for the OSIRIS-REx asteroid sample return mission.	IAU · 333384

== 333401–333500 ==
back to top

Named minor planet	Provisional	This minor planet was named for...	Ref · Catalog
333487 De Rose	2004 VV_{59}	Marcos R. De Rose, American systems engineer and real-time operator for the OSIRIS-REx asteroid sample return mission.	IAU · 333487
333490 Klaus	2004 XC_{9}	Mary A. Klaus, American engineer. She is the simulation integrator for the OSIRIS-REx asteroid sample return mission. I	IAU · 333490

== 333501–333600 ==
back to top

Named minor planet	Provisional	This minor planet was named for...	Ref · Catalog
333502 Candelaria	2005 EW_{67}	Patricia L Candelaria, the American information technology program manager for OSIRIS-REx Asteroid Sample Return Mission.	IAU · 333502
333506 Falkenstern	2005 JK_{32}	Paul Falkenstern, American engineer. He is the ground data systems lead for the Lockheed Martin's deep space exploration missions, including the OSIRIS-Rex asteroid sample return mission.	IAU · 333506
333508 Voiture	2005 KJ_{11}	Vincent Voiture (1597–1648), a French poet and prosateur.	JPL · 333508
333511 Paulfleming	2005 MR_{4}	Paul V. Fleming, American Engineer who is the flight software subsystem lead for the OSIRIS-REx asteroid sample return mission operations team.	IAU · 333511
333514 Kallemeyn	2005 NP_{10}	Pieter Kallemeyn Jr., American engineer. He was the fault protection engineer for Phase B of OSIRIS-REx before moving to the InSight Mars Lander as system design lead/spacecraft team lead.	IAU · 333514
333531 Prestonsherman	2005 SU_{5}	Preston Sherman (b. 1990) is an American engineer. He supported OSIRIS-REx during development in Denver, the launch campaign at Kennedy Space Center, and during flight operations from cruise to Proximity Operations to TAG.	IAU · 333531
333536 Faelan	2005 SG_{127}	Randall M. H. Faelan, American engineer who leads the real-time commanding of the OSIRIS-REx spacecraft.	IAU · 333536
333539 Rayfranco	2005 SU_{220}	Ray Franco, American Mission Operations Flight Software Engineer for the OSIRIS-REx Asteroid Sample Return Mission.	IAU · 333539
333541 Roissier	2005 TT_{14}	Russell F. Roissier, American spacecraft test lab engineer for the OSIRIS-REx Asteroid Sample Return Mission.	IAU · 333541
333544 Dubisher	2005 TR_{175}	Ryan D. Dubisher, American test engineer. His work with the OSIRISREx mission's Touch-and-Go Sample Acquisition Mechanism supported early innovation to flight qualification.	IAU · 333544
333545 Sarasanders	2005 UW_{43}	Sara M. Sanders, American test engineer for the OSIRIS-REx Asteroid Sample Return Mission.	IAU · 333545
333546 Perkins	2005 UA_{44}	Trevor Perkins, American systems engineer and Real Time Operator for the OSIRIS-REx Asteroid Sample Return Mission.	IAU · 333546
333551 Albaugh	2005 UR_{141}	Tyler D. Albaugh, American Flight Software Engineer for OSIRIS-REx. Prior to OSIRIS-REx.	IAU · 333551
333553 Salvador	2005 UN_{460}	Salvador Martinez III, American engineer.	IAU · 333553
333561 Plummer	2005 YP_{59}	Julia Plummer, American astromaterials processor at NASA Johnson Space Center for the OSIRIS-REx Mission.	IAU · 333561
333565 Rani	2006 AJ_{34}	Rani Chohan Gran, American science communicator and chemist.	IAU · 333565
333571 Hanish	2006 BV_{179}	Levi Hanish, American technician at Lockheed Martin Space.	IAU · 333571
333579 Rachelfunk	2006 SO_{174}	Rachel C. Funk, American member of the OSIRIS-REx Curation Team at NASA's Johnson Space Center.	IAU · 333579
333586 Melissarodriguez	2007 AS_{26}	Melissa C. Rodriguez, American lead for the Astromaterials Current Collections at Johnson Space Center, including OSIRIS-REx.	IAU · 333586
333588 Ryanpaquette	2007 BL_{33}	Ryan A. Paquette, American technician and prototype machinist at Lockheed Martin.	IAU · 333588
333591 Emilykeates	2007 CM_{29}	Emily Keates, Canadian engineer who worked on the OSIRIS-REx Laser Altimeter (OLA).	IAU · 333591
333594 Zabala	2007 EW_{17}	Jessa Zabala, Canadian engineer who worked on the OSIRIS-REx Laser Altimeter.	IAU · 333594
333597 Alexbjurstrom	2007 FU_{16}	Alexandra “Alex” Bjurstrom, Canadian engineer who worked on the OSIRIS REx Laser Altimeter.	IAU · 333597
333599 Rathan	2007 GH	Rathan “Ray” Balasingam, Canadian technician who built the OSIRISREx Laser Altimeter.	IAU · 333599
333600 Dietrich	2007 GB_{7}	Peter Dietric, Canadian optics specialist.	IAU · 333600

== 333601–333700 ==
back to top

Named minor planet	Provisional	This minor planet was named for...	Ref · Catalog
333601 Curtiscalva	2008 GG_{18}	Curtis David Calva, American astromaterials processor and member of the OSIRIS-REx	IAU · 333601
333605 Martella	2007 HX_{81}	Sam A. Martella (b. 1983), American Logistics Management Analyst who was the Field Recovery Lead for the OSIRIS-REx Asteroid Sample Return Mission.	IAU · 333605
333608 Michaelkaye	2007 LA_{3}	Michael Kaye, American systems engineer who was a spacecraft technician at Lockheed Martin involved in OSIRIS-REx spacecraft assembly.	IAU · 333608
333613 Hasten	2007 RW_{227}	Annie Hasten (b. 1988) is an American Mission Operations Financial lead. She supported the Insight, Lucy, OSIRIS-REx, MAVEN and Juno missions.	IAU · 333613
333614 Boyd	2007 RN_{247}	Emma Boyd, American engineer who was a Guidance, Navigation, and Control Engineer for OSIRIS-REx.	IAU · 333614
333617 Markjohnson	2007 TX_{82}	Mark A. Johnson, an American engineer. He was the Entry, Descent and Landing Lead for the OSIRIS-REx mission.	IAU · 333617
333620 Scottfrancis	2007 TP_{393}	Scott R. Francis, American Entry, Descent, and Landing (EDL) analyst for Deep Space Exploration missions.	IAU · 333620
333626 Huerta	2008 AT_{10}	Lorenzo “Larry” Huerta, American spacecraft IT systems engineer. Throughout his career, he has supported ISS/Shuttle programs and provided IT systems support for several spacecraft missions.	IAU · 333626
333627 Zacharyrule	2008 ED_{43}	Zachary Rule, American IT analyst. He began his career in deep-space exploration during early Lucy and OSIRIS-REx mission events.	IAU · 333627
333631 Arivogel	2008 GN_{50}	Ari Vogel, American spacecraft program manager. He directed the Lockheed Martin Deep Space Exploration Mission Segment during OSIRIS-REx sample collection and sample return, and led a team that enabled innovative exploration missions such as Lucy, Janus, MAVEN, Juno, Mars Sample Return, and Dragonfly.	IAU · 333631
333632 Athipathi	2008 GH_{52}	Athip Thirupathi Raj (b. 1995) is an aerospace engineer born in India. He works on developing fundamental building block technology for In-Space Assembly and Manufacturing capabilities. As a NASA MIRO scholar, Athip mentored underrepresented students to pursue careers in the Aerospace Industry.	IAU · 333632
333634 Maryhinkle	2008 GG_{128}	Mary L. Hinkle, American planetary scientist.	IAU · 333634
333636 Reboul	2008 QF_{7}	Henri Reboul (born 1946), a French cosmologist.	JPL · 333636
333639 Yaima	2008 QL_{16}	The Yaeyama Islands (local name "Yaima"), located at the southernmost end of Japan	JPL · 333639

== 333701–333800 ==
back to top

Named minor planet	Provisional	This minor planet was named for...	Ref · Catalog
333717 Alexgreaves	2009 SE_{41}	Alexander Richard Brian Greaves (born 2000), grandson of British discoverer Norman Falla	JPL · 333717
333744 Pau	2009 YW_{6}	Pau Bosch-Pellicer (born 2007) is the first grandson of the discoverer.	IAU · 333744

== 333801–333900 ==
back to top

Named minor planet	Provisional	This minor planet was named for...	Ref · Catalog
There are no named minor planets in this number range

== 333901–334000 ==
back to top

Named minor planet	Provisional	This minor planet was named for...	Ref · Catalog
There are no named minor planets in this number range

back to top

Preceded by 332,001–333,000	Meanings of minor-planet names List of minor planets: 333,001–334,000	Succeeded by 334,001–335,000
