= List of named minor planets: 300000–349999 =

This is a partial list of named minor planets in numerical order. It contains a total of 501 entries as of 9 November 2026. Minor planets for which no article exist are displayed in grey color and redirect to the list of minor planets (see List of minor planets § Main index).

== From 300,000 to 349,999 ==
- 300082 Moyocoanno
- 300124 Alessiazecchini
- 300128 Panditjasraj
- 300150 Lantan
- 300221 Brucebills
- 300226 Francocanepari
- 300286 Zintun
- 300300 TAM
- 300334 Antonalexander
- 300634 Chuwenshin
- 300821 Margaritasalas
- 300854 Changyuin
- 300892 Taichung
- 300909 Kenthompson
- 300928 Uderzo
- 300932 Kyslyuk
- 300933 Teresamarion
- 301021 Sofiarodriguez
- 301061 Egelsbach
- 301128 Frédéricpont
- 301153 Jinan
- 301263 Anitaheward
- 301394 Bensheim
- 301413 Rogerfux
- 301511 Hubinon
- 301522 Chaykin
- 301552 Alimenti
- 301553 Ninaglebova
- 301566 Melissajane
- 301622 Chastel
- 301623 Wynn-Williams
- 301638 Kressin
- 301794 Antoninkapustin
- 301946 Bugyi
- 301949 Hambálek
- 302542 Tilmann
- 302652 Hauke
- 302849 Richardboyle
- 302932 Francoballoni
- 303265 Littmann
- 303546 Bourbaki
- 303648 Mikszáth
- 303710 Velpeau
- 303909 Tomknops
- 304122 Ameliawehlau
- 304233 Majaess
- 304273 Seancarey
- 304368 Móricz
- 304557 Welling
- 304788 Cresques
- 304813 Cesarina
- 304826 Kini
- 304908 Steveoda
- 305181 Donelaitis
- 305238 Maxuehui
- 305254 Moron
- 305263 Krasznahorkai
- 305264 Tarrbéla
- 305287 Olegyankov
- 305344 Williamcolgrove
- 305660 Romyhaag
- 305661 Joejackson
- 305776 Susinnogabriele
- 305953 Josiedubey
- 306001 Joanllaneras
- 306019 Duren
- 306020 Kormilov
- 306128 Pipher
- 306191 Lentegábor
- 306257 Janethunten
- 306367 Nut
- 306386 Carlofavetti
- 306479 Tyburhoe
- 307261 Máni
- 307761 Vérteslászló
- 308197 Satrapi
- 308306 Dainere
- 308680 McLennan
- 308753 Daniellezemp
- 308798 Teo
- 308825 Siksika
- 308856 Daniket
- 308934 Merkinė
- 309206 Mažvydas
- 309227 Tsukiko
- 309295 Hourenzhi
- 309426 Guidoschwarz
- 309704 Baruffetti
- 309706 Ávila
- 309917 Sefyani
- 310025 Marcuscooper
- 310120 Mullaney
- 310222 Vasipetropoulou
- 310273 Paulsmeyers
- 310652 Hansjörgdittus
- 311119 Pacner
- 311231 Anuradhapura
- 311604 Axelmurk
- 311785 Erwanmazarico
- 311786 Mykolaleontovych
- 311957 Barryalbright
- 312001 Siobhánhaughey
- 312627 Brigitteyagüe
- 312676 Posner
- 312861 Wolfslehner
- 313116 Pálvenetianer
- 313384 Holetschek
- 313892 Furnish
- 313921 Daassou
- 314040 Tavannes
- 314082 Dryope
- 314159 Mattparker
- 314163 Kittenberger
- 314650 Neilnorman
- 314703 Davidflynn
- 314808 Martindutertre
- 314988 Sireland
- 315012 Hutchings
- 315046 Gianniferrari
- 315088 Daniels
- 315166 Pawelmaksym
- 315174 Sellek
- 315186 Schade
- 315218 La Boétie
- 315276 Yurigradovsky
- 315493 Zimin
- 315529 Claudinefrieden
- 315577 Carmenchu
- 315579 Vandersyppe
- 315941 Elenagómez
- 316010 Daviddubey
- 316020 Linshuhow
- 316028 Patrickwils
- 316039 Breizh
- 316042 Tilofranz
- 316080 Boni
- 316084 Mykolapokropyvny
- 316138 Giorgione
- 316186 Kathrynjoyce
- 316201 Malala
- 316202 Johnfowler
- 316450 Changhsiangtung
- 316527 Jürgenoberst
- 316709 POSS
- 316741 Janefletcher
- 317000 Simonepastore
- 317452 Wurukang
- 317715 Guydetienne
- 317809 Marot
- 317917 Jodelle
- 318412 Tramelan
- 318547 Fidrich
- 318676 Bellelay
- 318682 Carpaccio
- 318694 Keszthelyi
- 318698 Barthalajos
- 318723 Bialas
- 318794 Uglia
- 319009 Kudirka
- 319090 Barbarahillary
- 319227 Erichbär
- 319601 Šilutė
- 319636 Dziewulski
- 319651 Topografo
- 320065 Erbaghjolu
- 320153 Eglītis
- 320260 Bertout
- 320541 Asiaa
- 320790 Anestin
- 320880 Cabu
- 320942 Jeanette-Jesse
- 320977 Grudziądz
- 321024 Gijon
- 321045 Kretinga
- 321046 Klushantsev
- 321131 Alishan
- 321197 Qingdao
- 321324 Vytautas
- 321357 Mirzakhani
- 321405 Ingehorst
- 321453 Alexmarieann
- 321480 Juanluiscano
- 321484 Marsaalam
- 321485 Cross
- 321577 Keanureeves
- 321673 Huber
- 321802 Malaspina
- 322390 Planes de Son
- 322510 Heinrichgrüber
- 322539 Telšiai
- 322574 Werckmeister
- 322577 Stephanhellmich
- 322912 Jedlik
- 323552 Trudybell
- 324417 Kaišiadorys
- 324787 Włodarczyk
- 324925 Vivantdenon
- 325136 Zhongnanshan
- 325366 Asturias
- 325368 Ihorhuk
- 325369 Shishilov
- 325372 Irynadyachuk
- 325436 Khlebov
- 325455 Della Valle
- 325462 Felanitx
- 325476 Carlomarchioro
- 325558 Guyane
- 325588 Bridžius
- 325731 Maalin
- 325812 Zouchenglu
- 325973 Cardinal
- 326164 Miketoomey
- 326290 Akhenaten
- 326732 Nice
- 327030 Alanmaclure
- 327082 Tournesol
- 327421 Yanamandra
- 327512 Bíró
- 327632 Ferrarini
- 327695 Yokoono
- 327943 Xavierbarcons
- 327977 Skarga
- 327982 Balducci
- 327989 Howieglatter
- 328305 Jackmcdevitt
- 328432 Thomasposch
- 328477 Eckstein
- 328509 Kostyahrubych
- 328563 Mosplanetarium
- 328677 Stofan
- 328870 Danabarbato
- 329008 Frankbeaurepaire
- 329018 Neufeld
- 329025 Annekathrin
- 329069 Russellporter
- 329200 Billhicks
- 329935 Prévôt
- 330420 Tomroman
- 330440 Davinadon
- 330455 Anbrysse
- 330634 Boico
- 330640 Yangxuejun
- 330712 Rhodescolossus
- 330836 Orius
- 330856 Ernsthelene
- 330934 Natevanwey
- 331011 Peccioli
- 331105 Giselher
- 331298 Eunicefoote
- 331316 Cavedon
- 331341 Frankscholten
- 331371 Jockers
- 331605 Guidogryseels
- 331785 Sumners
- 331992 Chasseral
- 332084 Vasyakulbeda
- 332183 Jaroussky
- 332324 Bobmcdonald
- 332326 Aresi
- 332530 Canders
- 332632 Pharos
- 332706 Karlheidlas
- 332733 Drolshagen
- 332884 Arianagrande
- 332991 Tammybecker
- 333001 Calloway
- 333003 Espiritu
- 333005 Haberle
- 333018 Devin
- 333029 Sallitt
- 333033 Yutakahashi
- 333035 Pelgrift
- 333036 Sahr
- 333040 Dalehowell
- 333043 Courtneymario
- 333050 Olds
- 333052 Skeen
- 333054 Bloomquist
- 333055 Liang
- 333056 Bellamy
- 333057 Bowles
- 333059 Audi
- 333061 Joshuanelson
- 333065 Zeszut
- 333076 Claudiamanzoni
- 333079 Keara
- 333081 Cutts
- 333089 Dean
- 333096 Brittanyenos
- 333097 Andrewgardner
- 333101 Lovelace
- 333106 Lujan
- 333107 McDonough
- 333110 Lupe
- 333119 Sharonhelms
- 333120 Blum
- 333125 Maestas
- 333134 Alexandrahilbert
- 333138 Bellabrodbeck
- 333139 Deguzman
- 333146 Austin
- 333157 Buck
- 333166 Brennen
- 333171 Chris
- 333172 Danielellis
- 333175 Jaen
- 333176 Sierragonzales
- 333178 Sivaperuman
- 333183 Harishswabhash
- 333184 Craft
- 333190 Matthewjones
- 333195 Norberto
- 333205 Nair
- 333207 Lilliannguyen
- 333210 Lunning
- 333219 Rogerharrington
- 333224 Alanarosejohnson
- 333228 Mollywasser
- 333230 Simkus
- 333233 Duda
- 333234 Michaelstarobin
- 333241 Chugg
- 333242 Ericthomasparker
- 333245 Peachey
- 333251 Jamesroberts
- 333253 Steele
- 333255 Mayorga
- 333259 Wayland
- 333264 Gabriel
- 333267 Shekhtman
- 333268 Frédséguin
- 333288 Markperry
- 333373 Grahammiller
- 333384 Huikang
- 333487 De Rose
- 333490 Klaus
- 333502 Candelaria
- 333506 Falkenstern
- 333508 Voiture
- 333511 Paulfleming
- 333514 Kallemeyn
- 333531 Prestonsherman
- 333536 Faelan
- 333539 Rayfranco
- 333541 Roissier
- 333544 Dubisher
- 333545 Sarasanders
- 333546 Perkins
- 333551 Albaugh
- 333553 Salvador
- 333561 Plummer
- 333565 Rani
- 333571 Hanish
- 333579 Rachelfunk
- 333586 Melissarodriguez
- 333588 Ryanpaquette
- 333591 Emilykeates
- 333594 Zabala
- 333597 Alexbjurstrom
- 333599 Rathan
- 333600 Dietrich
- 333601 Curtiscalva
- 333605 Martella
- 333608 Michaelkaye
- 333613 Hasten
- 333614 Boyd
- 333617 Markjohnson
- 333620 Scottfrancis
- 333626 Huerta
- 333627 Zacharyrule
- 333631 Arivogel
- 333632 Athipathi
- 333634 Maryhinkle
- 333636 Reboul
- 333639 Yaima
- 333717 Alexgreaves
- 333744 Pau
- 334756 Leövey
- 335292 Larrey
- 335306 Mouhot
- 335500 Espresso
- 335533 Tarasprystavski
- 335668 Ignalina
- 335799 Zonglü
- 335853 Valléedaoste
- 335968 Xiejin
- 336108 Luberon
- 336109 Rokiškis
- 336177 Churri
- 336203 Sandrobuss
- 336204 Sardinas
- 336392 Changhua
- 336465 Deluna
- 336680 Pavolpaulík
- 336694 Fey
- 336698 Melbourne
- 336811 Baratoux
- 336877 Qifaren
- 337002 Robertbodzon
- 337044 Bobdylan
- 337166 Ivanartioukhov
- 337380 Lenormand
- 337700 Korpás
- 338274 Valančius
- 338284 Hodál
- 338371 Gerritsen
- 338373 Fonóalbert
- 338578 Csapodyvera
- 339223 Stongemorin
- 339486 Raimeux
- 339855 Kėdainiai
- 340071 Vanmunster
- 340479 Broca
- 340579 Losse
- 340687 Gerrysmith
- 340891 Londoncommorch
- 340929 Bourgelat
- 340980 Bad Vilbel
- 341317 Weisshaidinger
- 341359 Gregneumann
- 341361 Hughespack
- 341520 Mors–Somnus
- 341590 Emmawatson
- 341826 Aurelbaier
- 341958 Chrétien
- 342000 Neumünster
- 342017 Ramonin
- 342204 Oak Cliff
- 342372 Titia
- 342431 Hilo
- 342620 Beita
- 342764 Alantitus
- 342843 Davidbowie
- 342844 Anabel
- 342864 Teresamateo
- 343000 Ijontichy
- 343057 Lucaravenni
- 343134 Bizet
- 343157 Mindaugas
- 343158 Marsyas
- 343230 Corsini
- 343322 Tomskuniver
- 343412 de Boer
- 343413 Lauratoyama
- 343438 Gao
- 343439 Kaukali
- 343440 Magnier
- 343441 Chienchenglin
- 343444 Halluzinelle
- 343587 Mamuna
- 343662 Robmorgan
- 343664 Nataliemainzer
- 343743 Kjurkchieva
- 343774 Samuelhale
- 343981 Oppenheim
- 344000 Astropolis
- 344040 Davidiactor
- 344413 Campodeifiori
- 345574 Michael
- 344581 Albisetti
- 344641 Szeleczky
- 345648 Adyendre
- 345720 Monte Vigese
- 345762 Jacquescœur
- 345763 Pompiere
- 345842 Alexparker
- 345868 Halicarnassus
- 345871 Xuguangxian
- 345959 Dafeng
- 345971 Marktorrence
- 345972 Rufin
- 346150 Nanyi
- 346261 Alexandrescu
- 346318 Elektrėnai
- 346471 Sleeperhennig
- 346666 Knorozov
- 346721 Panchengdong
- 346810 Giancabattisti
- 346886 Middelburg
- 346889 Rhiphonos
- 346998 Wakamura
- 346999 Evalilly
- 347016 Haydnhuntley
- 347017 Pui-Hin
- 347020 Hofheim
- 347028 Važec
- 347266 Carrière
- 347336 Changmeemann
- 347940 Jorgezuluaga
- 348034 Deslorieux
- 348239 Societàdante
- 348383 Petibon
- 348407 Patkósandrás
- 348511 Žemaitė
- 349237 Quaglietti
- 349386 Randywright
- 349407 Stefaniafoglia
- 349499 Dechirico
- 349606 Fleurance
- 349785 Hsiaotejen
- 349862 Modigliani
back to top

== See also ==
- List of minor planet discoverers
- List of observatory codes
- Meanings of minor planet names § Index
