= List of minor planets: 333001–334000 =

The following is a partial list of minor planets, running from minor-planet number 333001 through 334000, inclusive. The primary data for this and other partial lists is based on JPL's "Small-Body Orbital Elements" and data available from the Minor Planet Center. Critical list information is also provided by the MPC, unless otherwise specified from Lowell Observatory. A detailed description of the table's columns and additional sources are given on the main page including a complete list of every page in this series, and a statistical break-up on the dynamical classification of minor planets.

Also see the summary list of all named bodies in numerical and alphabetical order, and the corresponding naming citations for the number range of this particular list. New namings may only be added to this list after official publication, as the preannouncement of names is condemned by the Working Group for Small Bodies Nomenclature of the International Astronomical Union.

Near-Earth obj.	MBA (inner)	MBA (outer)	Centaur
Mars-crosser	MBA (middle)	Jupiter trojan	Trans-Neptunian obj.
Unclassified

== 333001–333100 ==
Designation			Discovery			Properties		Ref
Permanent	Provisional	Named after	Date	Site	Discoverer(s)	Category	Diam.	Ref
333001 Calloway	2011 HB_{38}	Calloway	September 11, 2007	Mount Lemmon	Mount Lemmon Survey	·	3.6 km	MPC · JPL
333002	2011 HW_{53}	—	November 20, 2001	Socorro	LINEAR	PHO	1.9 km	MPC · JPL
333003 Espiritu	2011 HP_{58}	Espiritu	October 27, 2008	Mount Lemmon	Mount Lemmon Survey	·	3.8 km	MPC · JPL
333004	2011 HJ_{69}	—	March 11, 2005	Kitt Peak	Spacewatch	·	3.3 km	MPC · JPL
333005 Haberle	2011 JV_{15}	Haberle	February 13, 2010	Mount Lemmon	Mount Lemmon Survey	·	3.7 km	MPC · JPL
333006	2011 KK_{24}	—	February 16, 2004	Kitt Peak	Spacewatch	·	3.8 km	MPC · JPL
333007	2011 LT_{25}	—	October 3, 2002	Palomar	NEAT	·	2.9 km	MPC · JPL
333008	2011 LN_{28}	—	October 7, 2007	Kitt Peak	Spacewatch	MRX	1.1 km	MPC · JPL
333009	2011 OU_{3}	—	May 21, 2006	Kitt Peak	Spacewatch	·	2.0 km	MPC · JPL
333010	2011 OJ_{4}	—	June 20, 2007	Kitt Peak	Spacewatch	·	2.1 km	MPC · JPL
333011	2011 OB_{55}	—	September 12, 2007	Catalina	CSS	·	1.5 km	MPC · JPL
333012	2011 PP_{7}	—	March 17, 2005	Kitt Peak	Spacewatch	DOR	2.6 km	MPC · JPL
333013	2011 PY_{11}	—	March 14, 2004	Kitt Peak	Spacewatch	EOS	2.2 km	MPC · JPL
333014	2011 QA_{2}	—	September 22, 2003	Kitt Peak	Spacewatch	·	760 m	MPC · JPL
333015	2011 QQ_{11}	—	September 15, 2007	Catalina	CSS	·	1.6 km	MPC · JPL
333016	2011 QY_{14}	—	September 19, 2007	Kitt Peak	Spacewatch	·	1.6 km	MPC · JPL
333017	2011 QG_{26}	—	March 11, 1997	Socorro	LINEAR	JUN	1.5 km	MPC · JPL
333018 Devin	2011 QE_{28}	Devin	September 14, 2007	Mount Lemmon	Mount Lemmon Survey	NYS	1.3 km	MPC · JPL
333019	2011 QT_{60}	—	October 14, 2004	Kitt Peak	Spacewatch	·	1.8 km	MPC · JPL
333020	2011 QC_{62}	—	October 22, 2003	Kitt Peak	Spacewatch	·	1.6 km	MPC · JPL
333021	2011 QU_{64}	—	February 16, 2001	Kitt Peak	Spacewatch	ADE	4.1 km	MPC · JPL
333022	2011 QB_{79}	—	February 4, 2005	Kitt Peak	Spacewatch	·	1.8 km	MPC · JPL
333023	2011 RN_{1}	—	June 25, 2007	Kitt Peak	Spacewatch	NYS	1.3 km	MPC · JPL
333024	2011 RK_{13}	—	August 23, 2007	Dauban	Kugel, F.	·	1.4 km	MPC · JPL
333025	2011 RW_{14}	—	September 22, 2003	Kitt Peak	Spacewatch	·	1.9 km	MPC · JPL
333026	2011 RR_{18}	—	October 4, 1999	Kitt Peak	Spacewatch	·	770 m	MPC · JPL
333027	2011 SC_{12}	—	October 16, 1977	Palomar	C. J. van Houten, I. van Houten-Groeneveld, T. Gehrels	·	2.7 km	MPC · JPL
333028	2011 SL_{29}	—	December 3, 2005	Mauna Kea	A. Boattini	MAS	870 m	MPC · JPL
333029 Sallitt	2011 SK_{32}	Sallitt	July 18, 2007	Mount Lemmon	Mount Lemmon Survey	·	2.0 km	MPC · JPL
333030	2011 SR_{32}	—	August 10, 2007	Kitt Peak	Spacewatch	MAS	750 m	MPC · JPL
333031	2011 SX_{42}	—	May 10, 2010	Siding Spring	SSS	ADE	3.7 km	MPC · JPL
333032	2011 SC_{65}	—	October 3, 2003	Kitt Peak	Spacewatch	·	1.5 km	MPC · JPL
333033 Yutakahashi	2011 SO_{66}	Yutakahashi	September 15, 2007	Mount Lemmon	Mount Lemmon Survey	NYS	1.3 km	MPC · JPL
333034	2011 SL_{72}	—	October 10, 2007	Kitt Peak	Spacewatch	·	1.3 km	MPC · JPL
333035 Pelgrift	2011 SX_{90}	Pelgrift	October 31, 2007	Mount Lemmon	Mount Lemmon Survey	·	1.3 km	MPC · JPL
333036 Sahr	2011 SC_{91}	Sahr	September 13, 2007	Mount Lemmon	Mount Lemmon Survey	SUL	2.2 km	MPC · JPL
333037	2011 SX_{91}	—	September 3, 2007	Catalina	CSS	·	1.6 km	MPC · JPL
333038	2011 SM_{103}	—	January 16, 2005	Kitt Peak	Spacewatch	·	1.2 km	MPC · JPL
333039	2011 SZ_{106}	—	February 25, 2006	Kitt Peak	Spacewatch	NYS	1.6 km	MPC · JPL
333040 Dalehowell	2011 SF_{115}	Dalehowell	November 20, 2000	Socorro	LINEAR	·	1.5 km	MPC · JPL
333041	2011 SY_{115}	—	October 9, 1999	Kitt Peak	Spacewatch	·	960 m	MPC · JPL
333042	2011 SW_{119}	—	September 3, 2007	Catalina	CSS	NYS	1.5 km	MPC · JPL
333043 Courtneymario	2011 SU_{129}	Courtneymario	December 20, 2004	Mount Lemmon	Mount Lemmon Survey	·	930 m	MPC · JPL
333044	2011 SP_{131}	—	May 20, 2006	Kitt Peak	Spacewatch	·	1.2 km	MPC · JPL
333045	2011 SE_{134}	—	August 10, 2007	Kitt Peak	Spacewatch	·	1.5 km	MPC · JPL
333046	2011 SQ_{135}	—	March 21, 2002	Kitt Peak	Spacewatch	·	1.5 km	MPC · JPL
333047	2011 SL_{144}	—	January 18, 2005	Catalina	CSS	·	1.2 km	MPC · JPL
333048	2011 SS_{164}	—	December 28, 2003	Socorro	LINEAR	·	2.0 km	MPC · JPL
333049	2011 SP_{168}	—	April 26, 2003	Kitt Peak	Spacewatch	NYS	1.1 km	MPC · JPL
333050 Olds	2011 SA_{174}	Olds	March 11, 2005	Mount Lemmon	Mount Lemmon Survey	·	1.4 km	MPC · JPL
333051	2011 SA_{185}	—	April 9, 1996	Kitt Peak	Spacewatch	·	1.4 km	MPC · JPL
333052 Skeen	2011 SQ_{185}	Skeen	October 20, 2007	Mount Lemmon	Mount Lemmon Survey	·	2.2 km	MPC · JPL
333053	2011 SV_{185}	—	October 11, 2007	Kitt Peak	Spacewatch	·	1.1 km	MPC · JPL
333054 Bloomquist	2011 SK_{200}	Bloomquist	May 6, 2006	Mount Lemmon	Mount Lemmon Survey	·	1.3 km	MPC · JPL
333055 Liang	2011 SC_{223}	Liang	September 15, 2007	Mount Lemmon	Mount Lemmon Survey	·	1.3 km	MPC · JPL
333056 Bellamy	2011 SE_{226}	Bellamy	October 16, 2007	Mount Lemmon	Mount Lemmon Survey	·	2.3 km	MPC · JPL
333057 Bowles	2011 SO_{234}	Bowles	September 12, 2007	Mount Lemmon	Mount Lemmon Survey	EUN	1.3 km	MPC · JPL
333058	2011 SD_{255}	—	February 12, 2004	Kitt Peak	Spacewatch	AGN	1.5 km	MPC · JPL
333059 Audi	2011 SG_{261}	Audi	February 25, 2006	Mount Lemmon	Mount Lemmon Survey	MAS	750 m	MPC · JPL
333060	2011 TF	—	March 19, 2001	Anderson Mesa	LONEOS	·	1.7 km	MPC · JPL
333061 Joshuanelson	2011 TD_{13}	Joshuanelson	December 19, 2004	Mount Lemmon	Mount Lemmon Survey	NYS	1.1 km	MPC · JPL
333062	2011 TZ_{14}	—	April 19, 2006	Kitt Peak	Spacewatch	·	2.7 km	MPC · JPL
333063	2011 UQ_{9}	—	September 17, 2006	Kitt Peak	Spacewatch	·	3.1 km	MPC · JPL
333064	2011 UG_{15}	—	September 12, 2007	Catalina	CSS	·	2.7 km	MPC · JPL
333065 Zeszut	2011 UX_{17}	Zeszut	September 13, 2007	Mount Lemmon	Mount Lemmon Survey	NYS	1.3 km	MPC · JPL
333066	2011 UP_{21}	—	September 19, 2007	Dauban	Kugel, F.	·	1.9 km	MPC · JPL
333067	2011 UE_{27}	—	January 26, 2001	Kitt Peak	Spacewatch	MAS	680 m	MPC · JPL
333068	2011 UM_{36}	—	March 11, 2005	Mount Lemmon	Mount Lemmon Survey	·	1.1 km	MPC · JPL
333069	2011 US_{46}	—	October 7, 2005	Mauna Kea	A. Boattini	·	970 m	MPC · JPL
333070	2011 UK_{48}	—	October 15, 2007	Kitt Peak	Spacewatch	·	1.4 km	MPC · JPL
333071	2011 UZ_{49}	—	September 30, 2003	Kitt Peak	Spacewatch	·	1.4 km	MPC · JPL
333072	2011 UJ_{53}	—	January 1, 2009	Kitt Peak	Spacewatch	·	1.3 km	MPC · JPL
333073	2011 UA_{59}	—	October 31, 1999	Kitt Peak	Spacewatch	·	980 m	MPC · JPL
333074	2011 UP_{65}	—	September 18, 2007	Kitt Peak	Spacewatch	(5)	940 m	MPC · JPL
333075	2011 UV_{71}	—	October 8, 2004	Kitt Peak	Spacewatch	·	1.8 km	MPC · JPL
333076 Claudiamanzoni	2011 UL_{80}	Claudiamanzoni	October 16, 2007	Mount Lemmon	Mount Lemmon Survey	·	1.5 km	MPC · JPL
333077	2011 UW_{98}	—	September 20, 2003	Palomar	NEAT	PHO	2.8 km	MPC · JPL
333078	2011 UN_{108}	—	August 28, 2005	Anderson Mesa	LONEOS	·	5.2 km	MPC · JPL
333079 Keara	2011 UP_{112}	Keara	October 20, 2007	Mount Lemmon	Mount Lemmon Survey	·	1.1 km	MPC · JPL
333080	2011 UE_{119}	—	October 2, 1992	Kitt Peak	Spacewatch	MAS	710 m	MPC · JPL
333081 Cutts	2011 UM_{122}	Cutts	September 13, 2007	Mount Lemmon	Mount Lemmon Survey	NYS	1.2 km	MPC · JPL
333082	2011 UT_{126}	—	November 21, 2000	Socorro	LINEAR	·	1.5 km	MPC · JPL
333083	2011 UT_{129}	—	May 6, 2006	Kitt Peak	Spacewatch	V	740 m	MPC · JPL
333084	2011 UH_{131}	—	April 29, 2003	Socorro	LINEAR	·	1.1 km	MPC · JPL
333085	2011 UM_{131}	—	September 18, 2003	Kitt Peak	Spacewatch	·	1.1 km	MPC · JPL
333086	2011 UU_{161}	—	September 11, 2007	Kitt Peak	Spacewatch	·	870 m	MPC · JPL
333087	2011 UK_{164}	—	February 24, 2006	Kitt Peak	Spacewatch	V	820 m	MPC · JPL
333088	2011 UM_{166}	—	January 17, 2005	Kitt Peak	Spacewatch	MAS	700 m	MPC · JPL
333089 Dean	2011 UD_{175}	Dean	January 7, 2006	Mount Lemmon	Mount Lemmon Survey	·	970 m	MPC · JPL
333090	2011 UE_{179}	—	November 17, 2006	Kitt Peak	Spacewatch	LIX	5.3 km	MPC · JPL
333091	2011 UX_{222}	—	September 19, 1998	Apache Point	SDSS	·	1.3 km	MPC · JPL
333092	2011 UG_{225}	—	February 20, 2006	Kitt Peak	Spacewatch	MAS	900 m	MPC · JPL
333093	2011 UN_{238}	—	November 17, 1993	Kitt Peak	Spacewatch	·	1.3 km	MPC · JPL
333094	2011 UU_{239}	—	February 22, 2006	Kitt Peak	Spacewatch	·	910 m	MPC · JPL
333095	2011 UA_{246}	—	March 11, 2002	Palomar	NEAT	·	2.0 km	MPC · JPL
333096 Brittanyenos	2011 UC_{248}	Brittanyenos	September 13, 2007	Mount Lemmon	Mount Lemmon Survey	·	1.1 km	MPC · JPL
333097 Andrewgardner	2011 UT_{248}	Andrewgardner	March 8, 2005	Mount Lemmon	Mount Lemmon Survey	MAS	650 m	MPC · JPL
333098	2011 UA_{274}	—	December 11, 2004	Kitt Peak	Spacewatch	·	1.3 km	MPC · JPL
333099	2011 UT_{274}	—	February 17, 2004	Kitt Peak	Spacewatch	AGN	1.3 km	MPC · JPL
333100	2011 UL_{283}	—	January 13, 2005	Catalina	CSS	·	1.1 km	MPC · JPL

== 333101–333200 ==
back to top

Designation			Discovery			Properties		Ref
Permanent	Provisional	Named after	Date	Site	Discoverer(s)	Category	Diam.	Ref
333101 Lovelace	2011 UE_{298}	Lovelace	September 14, 2007	Mount Lemmon	Mount Lemmon Survey	(5)	960 m	MPC · JPL
333102	2011 UZ_{298}	—	September 8, 2004	Palomar	NEAT	·	1.0 km	MPC · JPL
333103	2011 UY_{307}	—	August 23, 2003	Campo Imperatore	CINEOS	·	1.4 km	MPC · JPL
333104	2011 UF_{308}	—	August 24, 2000	Socorro	LINEAR	V	720 m	MPC · JPL
333105	2011 UU_{309}	—	October 22, 2003	Kitt Peak	Spacewatch	·	840 m	MPC · JPL
333106 Lujan	2011 UG_{311}	Lujan	December 20, 2004	Mount Lemmon	Mount Lemmon Survey	NYS	970 m	MPC · JPL
333107 McDonough	2011 US_{353}	McDonough	September 12, 2007	Mount Lemmon	Mount Lemmon Survey	·	1.4 km	MPC · JPL
333108	2011 UZ_{355}	—	January 4, 2000	Kitt Peak	Spacewatch	·	1.2 km	MPC · JPL
333109	2011 UB_{363}	—	September 15, 2002	Palomar	NEAT	·	1.5 km	MPC · JPL
333110 Lupe	2011 UZ_{384}	Lupe	September 2, 2007	Mount Lemmon	Mount Lemmon Survey	·	1.5 km	MPC · JPL
333111	2011 UD_{389}	—	February 21, 2003	Palomar	NEAT	EOS	2.4 km	MPC · JPL
333112	2011 UX_{390}	—	October 23, 2003	Apache Point	SDSS	·	1.5 km	MPC · JPL
333113	2011 UX_{394}	—	April 5, 2003	Kitt Peak	Spacewatch	·	2.1 km	MPC · JPL
333114	2011 UB_{397}	—	September 12, 2007	Catalina	CSS	·	1.8 km	MPC · JPL
333115	2011 UE_{401}	—	July 26, 2001	Palomar	NEAT	·	900 m	MPC · JPL
333116	2011 VH_{18}	—	April 19, 1993	Kitt Peak	Spacewatch	·	1.1 km	MPC · JPL
333117	2011 WO_{1}	—	January 1, 2001	Kitt Peak	Spacewatch	·	1.3 km	MPC · JPL
333118	2011 WW_{1}	—	August 1, 2001	Palomar	NEAT	·	930 m	MPC · JPL
333119 Sharonhelms	2011 WF_{7}	Sharonhelms	March 25, 2006	Mount Lemmon	Mount Lemmon Survey	MAS	760 m	MPC · JPL
333120 Blum	2011 WN_{7}	Blum	September 11, 2007	Mount Lemmon	Mount Lemmon Survey	·	1.2 km	MPC · JPL
333121	2011 WN_{10}	—	April 11, 2003	Kitt Peak	Spacewatch	·	3.3 km	MPC · JPL
333122	2011 WP_{12}	—	November 28, 2000	Kitt Peak	Spacewatch	MAS	620 m	MPC · JPL
333123	2011 WW_{48}	—	April 26, 2006	Kitt Peak	Spacewatch	·	1.3 km	MPC · JPL
333124	2011 WA_{49}	—	December 29, 2003	Anderson Mesa	LONEOS	·	3.5 km	MPC · JPL
333125 Maestas	2011 WT_{52}	Maestas	October 10, 2007	Mount Lemmon	Mount Lemmon Survey	·	840 m	MPC · JPL
333126	2011 WY_{56}	—	September 22, 2004	Kitt Peak	Spacewatch	CYB	3.3 km	MPC · JPL
333127	2011 WB_{72}	—	October 23, 2005	Kitt Peak	Spacewatch	EOS	3.0 km	MPC · JPL
333128	2011 WD_{76}	—	April 2, 2006	Kitt Peak	Spacewatch	·	1.2 km	MPC · JPL
333129	2011 WE_{81}	—	January 13, 2005	Catalina	CSS	NYS	920 m	MPC · JPL
333130	2011 WR_{83}	—	December 18, 2003	Kitt Peak	Spacewatch	MAR	1.5 km	MPC · JPL
333131	2011 WW_{87}	—	March 27, 2000	Kitt Peak	Spacewatch	·	2.0 km	MPC · JPL
333132	2011 WR_{98}	—	December 19, 2004	Mount Lemmon	Mount Lemmon Survey	MAS	600 m	MPC · JPL
333133	2011 WT_{117}	—	December 15, 2004	Kitt Peak	Spacewatch	·	1.5 km	MPC · JPL
333134 Alexandrahilbert	2011 WY_{123}	Alexandrahilbert	December 18, 2004	Mount Lemmon	Mount Lemmon Survey	·	1.2 km	MPC · JPL
333135	2011 WR_{144}	—	September 10, 2007	Kitt Peak	Spacewatch	MAS	600 m	MPC · JPL
333136	2011 WA_{145}	—	September 9, 2007	Kitt Peak	Spacewatch	·	950 m	MPC · JPL
333137	2011 YO_{2}	—	September 18, 2003	Kitt Peak	Spacewatch	NYS	1.1 km	MPC · JPL
333138 Bellabrodbeck	2011 YW_{4}	Bellabrodbeck	October 15, 2007	Catalina	CSS	·	1.4 km	MPC · JPL
333139 Deguzman	2011 YM_{8}	Deguzman	September 11, 2007	Mount Lemmon	Mount Lemmon Survey	·	790 m	MPC · JPL
333140	2011 YY_{46}	—	April 20, 2006	Anderson Mesa	LONEOS	·	1.7 km	MPC · JPL
333141	2011 YH_{53}	—	December 2, 2004	Kitt Peak	Spacewatch	·	900 m	MPC · JPL
333142	2011 YU_{63}	—	October 9, 1993	La Silla	E. W. Elst	·	990 m	MPC · JPL
333143	2012 AK_{11}	—	December 3, 2004	Kitt Peak	Spacewatch	·	840 m	MPC · JPL
333144	2012 AE_{12}	—	August 31, 2000	Kitt Peak	Spacewatch	·	1.1 km	MPC · JPL
333145	2012 AR_{15}	—	January 31, 2006	Mount Lemmon	Mount Lemmon Survey	·	930 m	MPC · JPL
333146 Austin	2012 AH_{20}	Austin	December 20, 2004	Mount Lemmon	Mount Lemmon Survey	·	930 m	MPC · JPL
333147	2012 BP	—	October 6, 2002	Palomar	NEAT	·	4.3 km	MPC · JPL
333148	2012 BC_{12}	—	August 22, 2004	Siding Spring	SSS	·	3.2 km	MPC · JPL
333149	2012 BO_{22}	—	February 7, 2003	Palomar	NEAT	·	2.2 km	MPC · JPL
333150	2012 BH_{23}	—	February 2, 2005	Kitt Peak	Spacewatch	·	1.0 km	MPC · JPL
333151	2012 BY_{27}	—	August 17, 2009	Kitt Peak	Spacewatch	·	3.6 km	MPC · JPL
333152	2012 BC_{30}	—	October 6, 1996	Prescott	P. G. Comba	·	1.1 km	MPC · JPL
333153	2012 BM_{39}	—	February 13, 2002	Apache Point	SDSS	·	700 m	MPC · JPL
333154	2012 BK_{55}	—	January 31, 2006	Kitt Peak	Spacewatch	·	3.2 km	MPC · JPL
333155	2012 BR_{57}	—	September 30, 2003	Kitt Peak	Spacewatch	·	980 m	MPC · JPL
333156	2012 BP_{68}	—	February 16, 2002	Palomar	NEAT	·	820 m	MPC · JPL
333157 Buck	2012 BO_{78}	Buck	September 10, 2007	Mount Lemmon	Mount Lemmon Survey	·	810 m	MPC · JPL
333158	2012 BK_{92}	—	February 9, 2008	Kitt Peak	Spacewatch	AGN	1.4 km	MPC · JPL
333159	2012 BP_{117}	—	February 1, 2005	Kitt Peak	Spacewatch	·	780 m	MPC · JPL
333160	2012 BE_{125}	—	December 9, 2004	Kitt Peak	Spacewatch	·	890 m	MPC · JPL
333161	2012 BM_{133}	—	January 17, 2005	Kitt Peak	Spacewatch	·	830 m	MPC · JPL
333162	2012 BP_{143}	—	June 24, 2006	Reedy Creek	J. Broughton	·	2.1 km	MPC · JPL
333163	2012 CY	—	March 10, 2002	Kitt Peak	Spacewatch	·	600 m	MPC · JPL
333164	2012 CS_{10}	—	April 19, 2006	Kitt Peak	Spacewatch	·	650 m	MPC · JPL
333165	2012 CG_{12}	—	December 3, 2004	Kitt Peak	Spacewatch	·	680 m	MPC · JPL
333166 Brennen	2012 CF_{19}	Brennen	January 23, 2006	Mount Lemmon	Mount Lemmon Survey	·	6.3 km	MPC · JPL
333167	2012 CF_{29}	—	February 16, 2007	Mount Lemmon	Mount Lemmon Survey	EOS	2.5 km	MPC · JPL
333168	2012 CR_{41}	—	August 30, 2002	Palomar	NEAT	SYL · CYB	4.7 km	MPC · JPL
333169	2012 CS_{44}	—	October 10, 2004	Kitt Peak	Spacewatch	·	530 m	MPC · JPL
333170	2012 CX_{46}	—	October 20, 2003	Kitt Peak	Spacewatch	EUP	3.9 km	MPC · JPL
333171 Chris	2012 CD_{51}	Chris	April 11, 2005	Mount Lemmon	Mount Lemmon Survey	3:2 · SHU	5.6 km	MPC · JPL
333172 Danielellis	2012 CR_{51}	Danielellis	December 24, 2006	Mount Lemmon	Mount Lemmon Survey	·	2.7 km	MPC · JPL
333173	2012 CR_{53}	—	March 22, 2002	Eskridge	G. Hug	·	5.4 km	MPC · JPL
333174	2012 CP_{54}	—	December 12, 1999	Socorro	LINEAR	·	4.3 km	MPC · JPL
333175 Jaen	2012 DZ_{3}	Jaen	January 22, 2006	Catalina	CSS	T_{j} (2.91)	4.0 km	MPC · JPL
333176 Sierragonzales	2012 DW_{8}	Sierragonzales	February 25, 2007	Mount Lemmon	Mount Lemmon Survey	AGN	1.6 km	MPC · JPL
333177	2012 DB_{13}	—	November 30, 2003	Kitt Peak	Spacewatch	·	1.5 km	MPC · JPL
333178 Sivaperuman	2012 DZ_{16}	Sivaperuman	December 25, 2005	Mount Lemmon	Mount Lemmon Survey	·	2.9 km	MPC · JPL
333179	2012 DZ_{52}	—	October 9, 2007	Kitt Peak	Spacewatch	·	570 m	MPC · JPL
333180	2012 DP_{59}	—	November 5, 1994	Kitt Peak	Spacewatch	·	1.8 km	MPC · JPL
333181	2012 DZ_{65}	—	March 12, 2007	Kitt Peak	Spacewatch	·	3.2 km	MPC · JPL
333182	2012 DF_{76}	—	September 20, 1995	Kitt Peak	Spacewatch	MRX	1.2 km	MPC · JPL
333183 Harishswabhash	2012 DS_{79}	Harishswabhash	October 9, 2007	Mount Lemmon	Mount Lemmon Survey	·	1.9 km	MPC · JPL
333184 Craft	2012 EU_{8}	Craft	July 11, 2005	Mount Lemmon	Mount Lemmon Survey	·	1.3 km	MPC · JPL
333185	2012 EZ_{8}	—	January 10, 2006	Kitt Peak	Spacewatch	·	2.9 km	MPC · JPL
333186	2012 FQ_{12}	—	September 18, 2003	Kitt Peak	Spacewatch	·	820 m	MPC · JPL
333187	2012 FA_{22}	—	December 25, 2005	Kitt Peak	Spacewatch	·	3.1 km	MPC · JPL
333188	2012 FT_{42}	—	February 8, 2008	Kitt Peak	Spacewatch	·	1.1 km	MPC · JPL
333189	2012 FL_{55}	—	September 4, 2000	Anderson Mesa	LONEOS	·	2.7 km	MPC · JPL
333190 Matthewjones	2012 FZ_{57}	Matthewjones	February 21, 2006	Catalina	CSS	·	4.6 km	MPC · JPL
333191	2012 FD_{59}	—	October 24, 2005	Kitt Peak	Spacewatch	·	1.7 km	MPC · JPL
333192	2012 FA_{62}	—	April 9, 2008	Kitt Peak	Spacewatch	NYS	1.4 km	MPC · JPL
333193	2012 FJ_{64}	—	September 21, 2003	Kitt Peak	Spacewatch	·	1.0 km	MPC · JPL
333194	2012 FH_{76}	—	October 1, 2005	Kitt Peak	Spacewatch	·	2.2 km	MPC · JPL
333195 Norberto	2012 FV_{76}	Norberto	March 15, 2005	Mount Lemmon	Mount Lemmon Survey	NYS	1.0 km	MPC · JPL
333196	2012 FM_{78}	—	February 24, 2006	Palomar	NEAT	·	4.1 km	MPC · JPL
333197	2012 GF_{4}	—	March 24, 2003	Kitt Peak	Spacewatch	·	1.7 km	MPC · JPL
333198	2012 GL_{7}	—	November 11, 2006	Kitt Peak	Spacewatch	V	850 m	MPC · JPL
333199	2012 GB_{17}	—	December 24, 2006	Kitt Peak	Spacewatch	·	1.8 km	MPC · JPL
333200	2012 GG_{20}	—	October 23, 2003	Apache Point	SDSS	·	3.2 km	MPC · JPL

== 333201–333300 ==
back to top

Designation			Discovery			Properties		Ref
Permanent	Provisional	Named after	Date	Site	Discoverer(s)	Category	Diam.	Ref
333201	2012 GS_{28}	—	November 24, 2003	Kitt Peak	Spacewatch	·	4.7 km	MPC · JPL
333202	2012 GY_{31}	—	April 19, 2006	Palomar	NEAT	·	3.5 km	MPC · JPL
333203	2012 GL_{34}	—	March 12, 2003	Palomar	NEAT	·	2.3 km	MPC · JPL
333204	2012 GY_{37}	—	November 23, 2006	Kitt Peak	Spacewatch	·	1.6 km	MPC · JPL
333205 Nair	2012 HA	Nair	February 13, 2009	Catalina	CSS	H	770 m	MPC · JPL
333206	2012 HV_{3}	—	December 22, 2005	Socorro	LINEAR	H	700 m	MPC · JPL
333207 Lilliannguyen	2012 HA_{4}	Lilliannguyen	May 8, 2005	Mount Lemmon	Mount Lemmon Survey	NYS	850 m	MPC · JPL
333208	2012 HR_{8}	—	August 9, 2004	Siding Spring	SSS	·	1.6 km	MPC · JPL
333209	2012 HS_{11}	—	January 20, 2007	Charleston	R. Holmes	MAR	1.4 km	MPC · JPL
333210 Lunning	2012 HX_{14}	Lunning	January 5, 2006	Catalina	CSS	EMA	4.9 km	MPC · JPL
333211	2012 HH_{17}	—	October 9, 2004	Kitt Peak	Spacewatch	TEL	1.5 km	MPC · JPL
333212	2012 HQ_{17}	—	February 2, 2008	Kitt Peak	Spacewatch	·	990 m	MPC · JPL
333213	2012 HS_{17}	—	June 29, 2008	Siding Spring	SSS	·	2.8 km	MPC · JPL
333214	2012 HH_{19}	—	February 23, 2007	Kitt Peak	Spacewatch	·	1.7 km	MPC · JPL
333215	2012 HG_{20}	—	June 10, 2004	Socorro	LINEAR	H	670 m	MPC · JPL
333216	2012 HV_{23}	—	February 16, 2001	Socorro	LINEAR	·	3.5 km	MPC · JPL
333217	2012 HG_{24}	—	March 27, 2003	Palomar	NEAT	MAR	1.6 km	MPC · JPL
333218	2012 HA_{38}	—	November 18, 2003	Kitt Peak	Spacewatch	·	4.0 km	MPC · JPL
333219 Rogerharrington	2012 HE_{38}	Rogerharrington	March 15, 2007	Mount Lemmon	Mount Lemmon Survey	TRE	3.6 km	MPC · JPL
333220	2012 HN_{38}	—	July 29, 2005	Siding Spring	SSS	NYS	1.2 km	MPC · JPL
333221	2012 HG_{39}	—	December 11, 2004	Kitt Peak	Spacewatch	·	1.1 km	MPC · JPL
333222	2012 HU_{39}	—	September 27, 2003	Apache Point	SDSS	·	3.6 km	MPC · JPL
333223	2012 HY_{39}	—	October 25, 2001	Apache Point	SDSS	·	2.0 km	MPC · JPL
333224 Alanarosejohnson	2012 HB_{40}	Alanarosejohnson	March 11, 2005	Catalina	CSS	·	910 m	MPC · JPL
333225	2012 HD_{40}	—	April 4, 1995	Kitt Peak	Spacewatch	·	1.9 km	MPC · JPL
333226	2012 HH_{40}	—	November 4, 2004	Kitt Peak	Spacewatch	·	3.6 km	MPC · JPL
333227	2012 HR_{41}	—	May 29, 2001	Haleakala	NEAT	HYG	4.1 km	MPC · JPL
333228 Mollywasser	2012 HW_{42}	Mollywasser	December 10, 2009	Mount Lemmon	Mount Lemmon Survey	·	3.6 km	MPC · JPL
333229	2012 HO_{45}	—	October 25, 2009	Kitt Peak	Spacewatch	·	2.5 km	MPC · JPL
333230 Simkus	2012 HO_{47}	Simkus	October 2, 2009	Mount Lemmon	Mount Lemmon Survey	·	2.7 km	MPC · JPL
333231	2012 HF_{48}	—	July 30, 2000	Socorro	LINEAR	·	1.8 km	MPC · JPL
333232	2012 HK_{48}	—	May 11, 2007	Kitt Peak	Spacewatch	·	2.7 km	MPC · JPL
333233 Duda	2012 HY_{48}	Duda	November 11, 2005	Catalina	CSS	·	2.4 km	MPC · JPL
333234 Michaelstarobin	2012 HQ_{49}	Michaelstarobin	February 6, 2007	Mount Lemmon	Mount Lemmon Survey	·	1.3 km	MPC · JPL
333235	2012 HZ_{49}	—	March 9, 2003	Palomar	NEAT	MAR	1.6 km	MPC · JPL
333236	2012 HE_{50}	—	April 15, 1996	Kitt Peak	Spacewatch	·	3.9 km	MPC · JPL
333237	2012 HU_{50}	—	March 15, 2007	Kitt Peak	Spacewatch	·	2.6 km	MPC · JPL
333238	2012 HC_{51}	—	May 2, 2003	Kitt Peak	Spacewatch	GEF	1.4 km	MPC · JPL
333239	2012 HP_{52}	—	September 4, 2008	Kitt Peak	Spacewatch	HYG	3.2 km	MPC · JPL
333240	2012 HU_{63}	—	September 7, 2004	Socorro	LINEAR	·	2.5 km	MPC · JPL
333241 Chugg	2012 HF_{65}	Chugg	October 1, 2005	Mount Lemmon	Mount Lemmon Survey	·	2.0 km	MPC · JPL
333242 Ericthomasparker	2012 HG_{65}	Ericthomasparker	May 8, 2005	Mount Lemmon	Mount Lemmon Survey	(2076)	900 m	MPC · JPL
333243	2012 HA_{67}	—	November 13, 2010	Kitt Peak	Spacewatch	ADE	2.3 km	MPC · JPL
333244	2012 HJ_{68}	—	December 13, 2006	Kitt Peak	Spacewatch	EUN	1.3 km	MPC · JPL
333245 Peachey	2012 HA_{71}	Peachey	October 6, 2008	Mount Lemmon	Mount Lemmon Survey	·	4.3 km	MPC · JPL
333246	2012 HY_{71}	—	February 15, 1994	Kitt Peak	Spacewatch	·	2.7 km	MPC · JPL
333247	2012 HO_{77}	—	March 11, 2007	Kitt Peak	Spacewatch	MRX	1.4 km	MPC · JPL
333248	2012 HE_{78}	—	June 22, 2004	Kitt Peak	Spacewatch	·	1.9 km	MPC · JPL
333249	2012 HM_{78}	—	December 2, 2005	Mauna Kea	A. Boattini	THM	2.3 km	MPC · JPL
333250	2012 HO_{79}	—	August 28, 1995	Kitt Peak	Spacewatch	·	2.3 km	MPC · JPL
333251 Jamesroberts	2012 JJ_{1}	Jamesroberts	October 15, 2004	Mount Lemmon	Mount Lemmon Survey	EOS	2.5 km	MPC · JPL
333252	2012 JO_{2}	—	December 24, 2006	Kitt Peak	Spacewatch	·	1.6 km	MPC · JPL
333253 Steele	2012 JE_{6}	Steele	December 19, 2004	Mount Lemmon	Mount Lemmon Survey	·	4.6 km	MPC · JPL
333254	2012 JQ_{6}	—	November 24, 1998	Kitt Peak	Spacewatch	·	1.4 km	MPC · JPL
333255 Mayorga	2012 JS_{8}	Mayorga	January 28, 2007	Mount Lemmon	Mount Lemmon Survey	·	1.3 km	MPC · JPL
333256	2012 JZ_{8}	—	November 4, 2005	Kitt Peak	Spacewatch	·	2.9 km	MPC · JPL
333257	2012 JB_{9}	—	October 1, 2003	Kitt Peak	Spacewatch	EOS	2.7 km	MPC · JPL
333258	2012 JK_{9}	—	January 5, 2000	Kitt Peak	Spacewatch	·	3.0 km	MPC · JPL
333259 Wayland	2012 JG_{15}	Wayland	October 6, 2008	Mount Lemmon	Mount Lemmon Survey	VER	3.5 km	MPC · JPL
333260	2012 JE_{16}	—	July 20, 2001	Palomar	NEAT	PHO	1.3 km	MPC · JPL
333261	2012 JF_{19}	—	November 16, 2006	Kitt Peak	Spacewatch	·	1.4 km	MPC · JPL
333262	2012 JY_{20}	—	April 25, 2008	Kitt Peak	Spacewatch	·	1.2 km	MPC · JPL
333263	2012 JV_{21}	—	April 21, 2001	Haleakala	NEAT	H	630 m	MPC · JPL
333264 Gabriel	2012 JL_{22}	Gabriel	February 27, 2006	Catalina	CSS	·	3.7 km	MPC · JPL
333265	2012 JY_{26}	—	May 15, 2001	Anderson Mesa	LONEOS	T_{j} (2.92)	5.0 km	MPC · JPL
333266	2012 JA_{29}	—	June 19, 1998	Kitt Peak	Spacewatch	·	800 m	MPC · JPL
333267 Shekhtman	2012 JH_{32}	Shekhtman	September 28, 2006	Mount Lemmon	Mount Lemmon Survey	·	780 m	MPC · JPL
333268 Frédséguin	2012 KO_{9}	Frédséguin	September 28, 2009	Mount Lemmon	Mount Lemmon Survey	·	3.5 km	MPC · JPL
333269	2012 KR_{24}	—	June 10, 2004	Socorro	LINEAR	H	690 m	MPC · JPL
333270	2146 P-L	—	September 24, 1960	Palomar	C. J. van Houten, I. van Houten-Groeneveld, T. Gehrels	·	2.6 km	MPC · JPL
333271	4318 P-L	—	September 24, 1960	Palomar	C. J. van Houten, I. van Houten-Groeneveld, T. Gehrels	·	2.2 km	MPC · JPL
333272	1345 T-2	—	September 29, 1973	Palomar	C. J. van Houten, I. van Houten-Groeneveld, T. Gehrels	THB	4.1 km	MPC · JPL
333273	4276 T-2	—	September 29, 1973	Palomar	C. J. van Houten, I. van Houten-Groeneveld, T. Gehrels	·	1.1 km	MPC · JPL
333274	1994 AS_{7}	—	January 7, 1994	Kitt Peak	Spacewatch	·	710 m	MPC · JPL
333275	1994 LV	—	June 11, 1994	Kitt Peak	Spacewatch	·	2.2 km	MPC · JPL
333276	1995 QD_{16}	—	August 28, 1995	Kitt Peak	Spacewatch	·	750 m	MPC · JPL
333277	1996 XM_{23}	—	December 12, 1996	Kitt Peak	Spacewatch	EUN	1.9 km	MPC · JPL
333278	1997 TF_{11}	—	October 3, 1997	Kitt Peak	Spacewatch	·	1.4 km	MPC · JPL
333279	1997 TW_{12}	—	October 2, 1997	Kitt Peak	Spacewatch	·	1.5 km	MPC · JPL
333280	1998 QD_{82}	—	August 24, 1998	Socorro	LINEAR	·	2.6 km	MPC · JPL
333281	1998 RD_{20}	—	September 14, 1998	Socorro	LINEAR	·	1.2 km	MPC · JPL
333282	1998 SG_{153}	—	September 26, 1998	Socorro	LINEAR	·	2.3 km	MPC · JPL
333283	1998 YQ_{31}	—	December 22, 1998	Kitt Peak	Spacewatch	NYS	1.4 km	MPC · JPL
333284	1999 PJ_{1}	—	August 7, 1999	Anderson Mesa	LONEOS	AMO +1km	860 m	MPC · JPL
333285	1999 RP_{81}	—	September 7, 1999	Socorro	LINEAR	·	780 m	MPC · JPL
333286	1999 RE_{125}	—	September 9, 1999	Socorro	LINEAR	·	2.7 km	MPC · JPL
333287	1999 RD_{202}	—	September 8, 1999	Socorro	LINEAR	·	2.8 km	MPC · JPL
333288 Markperry	1999 SU_{14}	Markperry	September 29, 1999	Catalina	CSS	·	2.6 km	MPC · JPL
333289	1999 TK_{221}	—	October 2, 1999	Socorro	LINEAR	EUN	1.6 km	MPC · JPL
333290	1999 TZ_{301}	—	October 3, 1999	Kitt Peak	Spacewatch	·	2.4 km	MPC · JPL
333291	1999 VR_{34}	—	November 3, 1999	Socorro	LINEAR	·	2.5 km	MPC · JPL
333292	1999 VH_{63}	—	November 4, 1999	Socorro	LINEAR	·	2.3 km	MPC · JPL
333293	2000 QC_{13}	—	August 24, 2000	Socorro	LINEAR	·	1.1 km	MPC · JPL
333294	2000 QW_{215}	—	August 31, 2000	Socorro	LINEAR	·	1.3 km	MPC · JPL
333295	2000 SE_{11}	—	September 23, 2000	Socorro	LINEAR	·	1.5 km	MPC · JPL
333296	2000 SG_{16}	—	September 23, 2000	Socorro	LINEAR	·	2.0 km	MPC · JPL
333297	2000 SX_{89}	—	September 22, 2000	Socorro	LINEAR	·	2.0 km	MPC · JPL
333298	2000 SS_{90}	—	September 22, 2000	Socorro	LINEAR	·	4.2 km	MPC · JPL
333299	2000 SV_{131}	—	September 22, 2000	Socorro	LINEAR	·	3.7 km	MPC · JPL
333300	2000 SF_{212}	—	September 25, 2000	Socorro	LINEAR	·	1.4 km	MPC · JPL

== 333301–333400 ==
back to top

Designation			Discovery			Properties		Ref
Permanent	Provisional	Named after	Date	Site	Discoverer(s)	Category	Diam.	Ref
333301	2000 ST_{284}	—	September 23, 2000	Socorro	LINEAR	·	1.5 km	MPC · JPL
333302	2000 SN_{302}	—	September 28, 2000	Socorro	LINEAR	·	1.4 km	MPC · JPL
333303	2000 UD_{22}	—	October 24, 2000	Socorro	LINEAR	(5)	1.6 km	MPC · JPL
333304	2000 UT_{62}	—	October 25, 2000	Socorro	LINEAR	(5)	1.9 km	MPC · JPL
333305	2000 VB_{35}	—	November 1, 2000	Socorro	LINEAR	·	1.9 km	MPC · JPL
333306	2000 VQ_{56}	—	November 3, 2000	Socorro	LINEAR	·	1.5 km	MPC · JPL
333307	2000 WB_{156}	—	November 30, 2000	Socorro	LINEAR	·	2.2 km	MPC · JPL
333308	2001 FV_{60}	—	March 19, 2001	Socorro	LINEAR	·	1.2 km	MPC · JPL
333309	2001 FR_{116}	—	March 19, 2001	Socorro	LINEAR	·	1.1 km	MPC · JPL
333310	2001 GC_{1}	—	April 13, 2001	Socorro	LINEAR	H	820 m	MPC · JPL
333311	2001 MR_{3}	—	June 21, 2001	Socorro	LINEAR	AMO	550 m	MPC · JPL
333312	2001 MR_{18}	—	June 27, 2001	Anderson Mesa	LONEOS	·	1.7 km	MPC · JPL
333313	2001 OF_{29}	—	July 18, 2001	Palomar	NEAT	·	4.0 km	MPC · JPL
333314	2001 OM_{57}	—	July 16, 2001	Anderson Mesa	LONEOS	TIR	3.6 km	MPC · JPL
333315	2001 OY_{66}	—	July 23, 2001	Haleakala	NEAT	TIR	4.1 km	MPC · JPL
333316	2001 OR_{87}	—	July 30, 2001	Palomar	NEAT	·	4.0 km	MPC · JPL
333317	2001 OA_{100}	—	July 27, 2001	Anderson Mesa	LONEOS	·	5.1 km	MPC · JPL
333318	2001 OK_{113}	—	July 31, 2001	Palomar	NEAT	·	4.0 km	MPC · JPL
333319	2001 PD_{17}	—	August 9, 2001	Palomar	NEAT	·	4.9 km	MPC · JPL
333320	2001 PU_{62}	—	August 13, 2001	Haleakala	NEAT	·	4.1 km	MPC · JPL
333321	2001 QX_{3}	—	August 16, 2001	Socorro	LINEAR	T_{j} (2.97)	3.9 km	MPC · JPL
333322	2001 QG_{26}	—	August 16, 2001	Socorro	LINEAR	NYS	1.7 km	MPC · JPL
333323	2001 QX_{60}	—	August 18, 2001	Socorro	LINEAR	MAS	820 m	MPC · JPL
333324	2001 QK_{95}	—	August 22, 2001	Kitt Peak	Spacewatch	·	3.2 km	MPC · JPL
333325	2001 QW_{148}	—	August 21, 2001	Haleakala	NEAT	NYS	1.5 km	MPC · JPL
333326	2001 QW_{187}	—	August 21, 2001	Haleakala	NEAT	THB	5.1 km	MPC · JPL
333327	2001 QB_{209}	—	August 23, 2001	Anderson Mesa	LONEOS	·	3.8 km	MPC · JPL
333328	2001 QT_{213}	—	August 23, 2001	Anderson Mesa	LONEOS	·	5.4 km	MPC · JPL
333329	2001 QN_{250}	—	August 24, 2001	Haleakala	NEAT	·	2.5 km	MPC · JPL
333330	2001 QW_{272}	—	August 19, 2001	Socorro	LINEAR	·	1.2 km	MPC · JPL
333331	2001 QD_{294}	—	August 24, 2001	Anderson Mesa	LONEOS	ERI	1.8 km	MPC · JPL
333332	2001 RF_{2}	—	September 8, 2001	Socorro	LINEAR	T_{j} (2.98)	3.8 km	MPC · JPL
333333	2001 RC_{3}	—	September 8, 2001	Anderson Mesa	LONEOS	·	4.0 km	MPC · JPL
333334	2001 RB_{10}	—	September 10, 2001	Socorro	LINEAR	H	700 m	MPC · JPL
333335	2001 RK_{49}	—	September 9, 2001	Socorro	LINEAR	·	1.6 km	MPC · JPL
333336	2001 RU_{115}	—	September 12, 2001	Socorro	LINEAR	MAS	830 m	MPC · JPL
333337	2001 RO_{120}	—	September 12, 2001	Socorro	LINEAR	·	1.2 km	MPC · JPL
333338	2001 SC_{7}	—	September 18, 2001	Kitt Peak	Spacewatch	MAS	740 m	MPC · JPL
333339	2001 SM_{32}	—	September 16, 2001	Socorro	LINEAR	·	1.6 km	MPC · JPL
333340	2001 SS_{81}	—	September 20, 2001	Socorro	LINEAR	·	3.6 km	MPC · JPL
333341	2001 SD_{104}	—	September 20, 2001	Socorro	LINEAR	·	1.7 km	MPC · JPL
333342	2001 SE_{210}	—	September 19, 2001	Socorro	LINEAR	NYS	1.6 km	MPC · JPL
333343	2001 SE_{325}	—	September 16, 2001	Socorro	LINEAR	V	980 m	MPC · JPL
333344	2001 SE_{339}	—	September 21, 2001	Palomar	NEAT	·	3.7 km	MPC · JPL
333345	2001 ST_{344}	—	September 23, 2001	Palomar	NEAT	·	3.9 km	MPC · JPL
333346	2001 TF_{55}	—	October 14, 2001	Socorro	LINEAR	·	5.2 km	MPC · JPL
333347	2001 TT_{72}	—	October 13, 2001	Socorro	LINEAR	NYS	1.3 km	MPC · JPL
333348	2001 TK_{128}	—	October 11, 2001	Palomar	NEAT	·	1.3 km	MPC · JPL
333349	2001 TU_{131}	—	October 11, 2001	Palomar	NEAT	·	1.7 km	MPC · JPL
333350	2001 TO_{150}	—	October 10, 2001	Palomar	NEAT	·	1.5 km	MPC · JPL
333351	2001 TB_{227}	—	October 15, 2001	Kitt Peak	Spacewatch	·	5.3 km	MPC · JPL
333352	2001 UK_{6}	—	October 22, 2001	Emerald Lane	L. Ball	NYS	1.6 km	MPC · JPL
333353	2001 UV_{42}	—	October 17, 2001	Socorro	LINEAR	·	1.3 km	MPC · JPL
333354	2001 UR_{62}	—	October 17, 2001	Socorro	LINEAR	V	910 m	MPC · JPL
333355	2001 UU_{117}	—	October 22, 2001	Socorro	LINEAR	·	1.5 km	MPC · JPL
333356	2001 UK_{188}	—	October 17, 2001	Socorro	LINEAR	·	1.4 km	MPC · JPL
333357	2001 VV_{87}	—	November 12, 2001	Haleakala	NEAT	PHO	1.7 km	MPC · JPL
333358	2001 WN_{1}	—	November 17, 2001	Socorro	LINEAR	AMO	420 m	MPC · JPL
333359	2001 XY_{110}	—	December 11, 2001	Socorro	LINEAR	·	1.4 km	MPC · JPL
333360	2001 XN_{124}	—	December 14, 2001	Socorro	LINEAR	·	2.1 km	MPC · JPL
333361	2001 XA_{222}	—	December 15, 2001	Socorro	LINEAR	NYS	1.5 km	MPC · JPL
333362	2001 XH_{243}	—	December 14, 2001	Socorro	LINEAR	·	2.2 km	MPC · JPL
333363	2001 YC_{51}	—	December 18, 2001	Socorro	LINEAR	·	1.6 km	MPC · JPL
333364	2001 YM_{71}	—	December 18, 2001	Socorro	LINEAR	·	2.2 km	MPC · JPL
333365	2002 CC_{93}	—	February 7, 2002	Socorro	LINEAR	·	1.8 km	MPC · JPL
333366	2002 CP_{143}	—	February 9, 2002	Socorro	LINEAR	CYB	7.2 km	MPC · JPL
333367	2002 CH_{212}	—	February 10, 2002	Socorro	LINEAR	(5)	1.3 km	MPC · JPL
333368	2002 FS_{4}	—	January 12, 2002	Socorro	LINEAR	·	2.2 km	MPC · JPL
333369	2002 GA_{77}	—	April 9, 2002	Anderson Mesa	LONEOS	DOR	2.7 km	MPC · JPL
333370	2002 HO_{7}	—	April 19, 2002	Kitt Peak	Spacewatch	·	700 m	MPC · JPL
333371	2002 JM_{93}	—	May 11, 2002	Socorro	LINEAR	·	1.7 km	MPC · JPL
333372	2002 NE_{31}	—	July 13, 2002	Palomar	NEAT	·	770 m	MPC · JPL
333373 Grahammiller	2002 NS_{75}	Grahammiller	October 13, 2007	Mount Lemmon	Mount Lemmon Survey	·	2.6 km	MPC · JPL
333374	2002 NY_{79}	—	November 10, 2009	Kitt Peak	Spacewatch	HYG	3.2 km	MPC · JPL
333375	2002 PE_{28}	—	August 6, 2002	Palomar	NEAT	·	880 m	MPC · JPL
333376	2002 PD_{66}	—	August 6, 2002	Palomar	NEAT	·	2.3 km	MPC · JPL
333377	2002 PH_{107}	—	August 12, 2002	Haleakala	NEAT	·	890 m	MPC · JPL
333378	2002 PH_{123}	—	July 21, 2002	Palomar	NEAT	·	2.7 km	MPC · JPL
333379	2002 PJ_{127}	—	July 23, 2002	Palomar	NEAT	·	790 m	MPC · JPL
333380	2002 PY_{186}	—	August 11, 2002	Palomar	NEAT	·	640 m	MPC · JPL
333381	2002 PX_{188}	—	August 11, 2002	Haleakala	NEAT	·	2.9 km	MPC · JPL
333382	2002 PG_{192}	—	August 11, 2002	Palomar	NEAT	·	3.8 km	MPC · JPL
333383	2002 PX_{200}	—	November 18, 1998	Kitt Peak	Spacewatch	KOR	1.5 km	MPC · JPL
333384 Huikang	2002 QC_{151}	Huikang	August 28, 2006	Catalina	CSS	·	1.4 km	MPC · JPL
333385	2002 QM_{151}	—	November 20, 2003	Kitt Peak	Spacewatch	EOS	2.2 km	MPC · JPL
333386	2002 QP_{151}	—	April 20, 2006	Kitt Peak	Spacewatch	·	2.5 km	MPC · JPL
333387	2002 RJ_{9}	—	September 4, 2002	Palomar	NEAT	·	720 m	MPC · JPL
333388	2002 RZ_{73}	—	September 5, 2002	Socorro	LINEAR	·	780 m	MPC · JPL
333389	2002 RS_{181}	—	September 13, 2002	Goodricke-Pigott	R. A. Tucker	·	1.0 km	MPC · JPL
333390	2002 RQ_{217}	—	August 12, 2002	Haleakala	NEAT	·	900 m	MPC · JPL
333391	2002 RZ_{223}	—	September 13, 2002	Anderson Mesa	LONEOS	·	670 m	MPC · JPL
333392	2002 SO_{38}	—	September 30, 2002	Socorro	LINEAR	·	1.0 km	MPC · JPL
333393	2002 TB_{8}	—	October 1, 2002	Haleakala	NEAT	·	1.6 km	MPC · JPL
333394	2002 TG_{26}	—	October 2, 2002	Socorro	LINEAR	·	2.3 km	MPC · JPL
333395	2002 TQ_{59}	—	October 4, 2002	Socorro	LINEAR	H	780 m	MPC · JPL
333396	2002 TR_{73}	—	October 3, 2002	Palomar	NEAT	·	1 km	MPC · JPL
333397	2002 TJ_{113}	—	October 3, 2002	Palomar	NEAT	EOS	2.6 km	MPC · JPL
333398	2002 TM_{125}	—	October 4, 2002	Palomar	NEAT	·	2.2 km	MPC · JPL
333399	2002 TS_{128}	—	October 4, 2002	Palomar	NEAT	·	4.8 km	MPC · JPL
333400	2002 TO_{182}	—	October 4, 2002	Palomar	NEAT	·	2.0 km	MPC · JPL

== 333401–333500 ==
back to top

Designation			Discovery			Properties		Ref
Permanent	Provisional	Named after	Date	Site	Discoverer(s)	Category	Diam.	Ref
333401	2002 TE_{283}	—	October 10, 2002	Socorro	LINEAR	·	2.3 km	MPC · JPL
333402	2002 TW_{291}	—	October 10, 2002	Socorro	LINEAR	EMA	5.0 km	MPC · JPL
333403	2002 TZ_{346}	—	October 5, 2002	Apache Point	SDSS	EMA	4.8 km	MPC · JPL
333404	2002 TB_{348}	—	October 5, 2002	Apache Point	SDSS	V	720 m	MPC · JPL
333405	2002 TB_{366}	—	October 10, 2002	Apache Point	SDSS	·	870 m	MPC · JPL
333406	2002 TW_{375}	—	October 4, 2002	Socorro	LINEAR	·	1.5 km	MPC · JPL
333407	2002 VB_{8}	—	November 1, 2002	Palomar	NEAT	·	4.8 km	MPC · JPL
333408	2002 VU_{12}	—	November 4, 2002	Palomar	NEAT	·	5.5 km	MPC · JPL
333409	2002 VF_{26}	—	November 5, 2002	Socorro	LINEAR	·	5.5 km	MPC · JPL
333410	2002 VY_{26}	—	November 5, 2002	Socorro	LINEAR	·	1.0 km	MPC · JPL
333411	2002 VW_{109}	—	November 12, 2002	Socorro	LINEAR	·	2.0 km	MPC · JPL
333412	2002 WE_{29}	—	November 16, 2002	Palomar	NEAT	L5	10 km	MPC · JPL
333413	2002 XZ_{17}	—	December 5, 2002	Socorro	LINEAR	·	3.1 km	MPC · JPL
333414	2002 XD_{62}	—	December 11, 2002	Socorro	LINEAR	·	840 m	MPC · JPL
333415	2002 XB_{68}	—	December 11, 2002	Palomar	NEAT	·	3.1 km	MPC · JPL
333416	2003 AG_{2}	—	January 2, 2003	Socorro	LINEAR	·	2.1 km	MPC · JPL
333417	2003 AR_{72}	—	January 11, 2003	Socorro	LINEAR	·	1.8 km	MPC · JPL
333418	2003 FP_{29}	—	March 25, 2003	Palomar	NEAT	·	1.5 km	MPC · JPL
333419	2003 FT_{113}	—	March 31, 2003	Socorro	LINEAR	EUN	1.5 km	MPC · JPL
333420	2003 GR_{38}	—	April 7, 2003	Kitt Peak	Spacewatch	·	1.3 km	MPC · JPL
333421	2003 HG_{5}	—	April 24, 2003	Kitt Peak	Spacewatch	·	1.8 km	MPC · JPL
333422	2003 KJ_{2}	—	May 22, 2003	Kitt Peak	Spacewatch	·	2.0 km	MPC · JPL
333423	2003 KL_{11}	—	May 26, 2003	Kitt Peak	Spacewatch	·	2.5 km	MPC · JPL
333424	2003 MX_{3}	—	June 26, 2003	Socorro	LINEAR	·	2.8 km	MPC · JPL
333425	2003 NE_{1}	—	July 2, 2003	Haleakala	NEAT	·	2.5 km	MPC · JPL
333426	2003 OQ_{30}	—	July 24, 2003	Palomar	NEAT	MRX	1.4 km	MPC · JPL
333427	2003 QD_{22}	—	August 20, 2003	Palomar	NEAT	·	3.5 km	MPC · JPL
333428	2003 QL_{22}	—	August 20, 2003	Palomar	NEAT	·	2.5 km	MPC · JPL
333429	2003 QJ_{29}	—	August 22, 2003	Palomar	NEAT	·	2.5 km	MPC · JPL
333430	2003 QT_{110}	—	August 31, 2003	Socorro	LINEAR	TIN	1.3 km	MPC · JPL
333431	2003 RE_{13}	—	September 14, 2003	Haleakala	NEAT	·	2.3 km	MPC · JPL
333432	2003 RA_{14}	—	September 15, 2003	Haleakala	NEAT	·	1.9 km	MPC · JPL
333433	2003 SD_{55}	—	September 16, 2003	Anderson Mesa	LONEOS	·	3.7 km	MPC · JPL
333434	2003 SO_{61}	—	September 17, 2003	Socorro	LINEAR	·	3.1 km	MPC · JPL
333435	2003 SS_{144}	—	September 19, 2003	Palomar	NEAT	·	1.9 km	MPC · JPL
333436	2003 SE_{167}	—	September 22, 2003	Socorro	LINEAR	·	3.2 km	MPC · JPL
333437	2003 SB_{180}	—	September 19, 2003	Socorro	LINEAR	·	2.9 km	MPC · JPL
333438	2003 SX_{235}	—	September 27, 2003	Anderson Mesa	LONEOS	GEF	1.5 km	MPC · JPL
333439	2003 SV_{245}	—	September 26, 2003	Socorro	LINEAR	DOR	3.0 km	MPC · JPL
333440	2003 SD_{299}	—	September 29, 2003	Anderson Mesa	LONEOS	·	3.1 km	MPC · JPL
333441	2003 SL_{325}	—	September 17, 2003	Kitt Peak	Spacewatch	·	2.2 km	MPC · JPL
333442	2003 TN_{8}	—	October 2, 2003	Socorro	LINEAR	(18466)	3.5 km	MPC · JPL
333443	2003 TE_{19}	—	October 15, 2003	Anderson Mesa	LONEOS	·	2.1 km	MPC · JPL
333444	2003 UG_{1}	—	October 16, 2003	Palomar	NEAT	DOR	3.0 km	MPC · JPL
333445	2003 UU_{130}	—	October 19, 2003	Palomar	NEAT	BRA	2.2 km	MPC · JPL
333446	2003 UM_{135}	—	October 21, 2003	Palomar	NEAT	·	2.7 km	MPC · JPL
333447	2003 US_{249}	—	October 25, 2003	Socorro	LINEAR	·	2.7 km	MPC · JPL
333448	2003 UD_{288}	—	September 28, 2003	Kitt Peak	Spacewatch	KOR	1.7 km	MPC · JPL
333449	2003 UR_{371}	—	October 22, 2003	Apache Point	SDSS	·	2.5 km	MPC · JPL
333450	2003 WD_{75}	—	November 18, 2003	Kitt Peak	Spacewatch	·	2.5 km	MPC · JPL
333451	2003 WW_{129}	—	November 21, 2003	Socorro	LINEAR	·	3.0 km	MPC · JPL
333452	2003 WU_{179}	—	November 20, 2003	Kitt Peak	M. W. Buie	·	3.9 km	MPC · JPL
333453	2003 YS_{25}	—	December 18, 2003	Socorro	LINEAR	·	1.2 km	MPC · JPL
333454	2004 BW_{44}	—	January 21, 2004	Socorro	LINEAR	PHO	1.7 km	MPC · JPL
333455	2004 FE_{66}	—	March 20, 2004	Socorro	LINEAR	PHO	2.9 km	MPC · JPL
333456	2004 OE_{13}	—	July 21, 2004	Siding Spring	SSS	H	660 m	MPC · JPL
333457	2004 PF_{1}	—	August 6, 2004	Reedy Creek	J. Broughton	H	870 m	MPC · JPL
333458	2004 PS_{2}	—	August 8, 2004	Socorro	LINEAR	H	740 m	MPC · JPL
333459	2004 PQ_{31}	—	August 8, 2004	Socorro	LINEAR	·	1.1 km	MPC · JPL
333460	2004 PD_{73}	—	August 8, 2004	Socorro	LINEAR	·	2.7 km	MPC · JPL
333461	2004 PD_{93}	—	August 12, 2004	Reedy Creek	J. Broughton	·	1.5 km	MPC · JPL
333462	2004 PW_{96}	—	August 12, 2004	Socorro	LINEAR	·	1.8 km	MPC · JPL
333463	2004 QH_{12}	—	August 21, 2004	Siding Spring	SSS	EUN	1.6 km	MPC · JPL
333464	2004 QH_{18}	—	August 20, 2004	Socorro	LINEAR	·	2.8 km	MPC · JPL
333465	2004 QN_{27}	—	August 25, 2004	Kitt Peak	Spacewatch	·	2.0 km	MPC · JPL
333466	2004 RF_{3}	—	September 6, 2004	Socorro	LINEAR	·	3.0 km	MPC · JPL
333467	2004 RW_{6}	—	September 5, 2004	Palomar	NEAT	·	1.3 km	MPC · JPL
333468	2004 RX_{144}	—	September 9, 2004	Socorro	LINEAR	·	1.1 km	MPC · JPL
333469	2004 RF_{151}	—	September 9, 2004	Socorro	LINEAR	·	3.5 km	MPC · JPL
333470	2004 RV_{154}	—	September 10, 2004	Socorro	LINEAR	·	1.6 km	MPC · JPL
333471	2004 RH_{178}	—	September 10, 2004	Socorro	LINEAR	·	1.5 km	MPC · JPL
333472	2004 RC_{181}	—	September 10, 2004	Socorro	LINEAR	(5)	1.1 km	MPC · JPL
333473	2004 RF_{211}	—	September 11, 2004	Socorro	LINEAR	·	1.4 km	MPC · JPL
333474	2004 RH_{249}	—	September 12, 2004	Socorro	LINEAR	H	750 m	MPC · JPL
333475	2004 RW_{322}	—	September 13, 2004	Socorro	LINEAR	·	1.3 km	MPC · JPL
333476	2004 RA_{323}	—	September 13, 2004	Socorro	LINEAR	(5)	1.2 km	MPC · JPL
333477	2004 SJ_{16}	—	September 17, 2004	Anderson Mesa	LONEOS	·	1.3 km	MPC · JPL
333478	2004 SD_{20}	—	September 21, 2004	Siding Spring	SSS	ATE +1km	870 m	MPC · JPL
333479	2004 ST_{51}	—	September 17, 2004	Socorro	LINEAR	RAF	1.4 km	MPC · JPL
333480	2004 TC_{10}	—	October 7, 2004	Socorro	LINEAR	APO	310 m	MPC · JPL
333481	2004 TB_{41}	—	October 4, 2004	Kitt Peak	Spacewatch	·	1.2 km	MPC · JPL
333482	2004 TD_{91}	—	October 5, 2004	Kitt Peak	Spacewatch	ADE	2.2 km	MPC · JPL
333483	2004 TT_{163}	—	October 6, 2004	Kitt Peak	Spacewatch	·	1.6 km	MPC · JPL
333484	2004 VE_{16}	—	November 5, 2004	Palomar	NEAT	·	2.1 km	MPC · JPL
333485	2004 VG_{25}	—	November 4, 2004	Anderson Mesa	LONEOS	·	1.5 km	MPC · JPL
333486	2004 VM_{36}	—	November 4, 2004	Kitt Peak	Spacewatch	·	1.1 km	MPC · JPL
333487 De Rose	2004 VV_{59}	De Rose	November 9, 2004	Catalina	CSS	·	3.1 km	MPC · JPL
333488	2004 WN_{1}	—	November 17, 2004	Campo Imperatore	CINEOS	·	1.8 km	MPC · JPL
333489	2004 XQ_{7}	—	December 2, 2004	Socorro	LINEAR	·	1.8 km	MPC · JPL
333490 Klaus	2004 XC_{9}	Klaus	December 2, 2004	Catalina	CSS	JUN	1.5 km	MPC · JPL
333491	2004 XF_{41}	—	December 10, 2004	Kitt Peak	Spacewatch	MRX	1.3 km	MPC · JPL
333492	2004 XX_{148}	—	December 14, 2004	Socorro	LINEAR	·	2.1 km	MPC · JPL
333493	2004 XG_{164}	—	December 15, 2004	Socorro	LINEAR	·	2.7 km	MPC · JPL
333494	2004 XG_{172}	—	December 10, 2004	Socorro	LINEAR	·	2.2 km	MPC · JPL
333495	2005 AF_{17}	—	January 6, 2005	Socorro	LINEAR	·	2.6 km	MPC · JPL
333496	2005 AX_{42}	—	January 15, 2005	Socorro	LINEAR	·	3.8 km	MPC · JPL
333497	2005 BO_{15}	—	January 16, 2005	Kitt Peak	Spacewatch	·	2.3 km	MPC · JPL
333498	2005 CG_{5}	—	February 1, 2005	Kitt Peak	Spacewatch	·	2.6 km	MPC · JPL
333499	2005 CC_{18}	—	February 2, 2005	Catalina	CSS	V	800 m	MPC · JPL
333500	2005 CT_{69}	—	February 9, 2005	Socorro	LINEAR	TIR	4.3 km	MPC · JPL

== 333501–333600 ==
back to top

Designation			Discovery			Properties		Ref
Permanent	Provisional	Named after	Date	Site	Discoverer(s)	Category	Diam.	Ref
333501	2005 CA_{81}	—	February 9, 2005	Anderson Mesa	LONEOS	·	2.6 km	MPC · JPL
333502 Candelaria	2005 EW_{67}	Candelaria	March 4, 2005	Mount Lemmon	Mount Lemmon Survey	LIX	5.1 km	MPC · JPL
333503	2005 EC_{212}	—	March 4, 2005	Socorro	LINEAR	EOS	2.8 km	MPC · JPL
333504	2005 ES_{330}	—	March 11, 2005	Anderson Mesa	LONEOS	·	4.1 km	MPC · JPL
333505	2005 GX_{70}	—	April 4, 2005	Kitt Peak	Spacewatch	·	3.4 km	MPC · JPL
333506 Falkenstern	2005 JK_{32}	Falkenstern	May 4, 2005	Mount Lemmon	Mount Lemmon Survey	·	750 m	MPC · JPL
333507	2005 JT_{97}	—	May 8, 2005	Kitt Peak	Spacewatch	·	800 m	MPC · JPL
333508 Voiture	2005 KJ_{11}	Voiture	May 31, 2005	Saint-Sulpice	Saint-Sulpice	·	880 m	MPC · JPL
333509	2005 LD_{6}	—	June 4, 2005	Socorro	LINEAR	PHO	1.3 km	MPC · JPL
333510	2005 MD	—	June 17, 2005	Mount Lemmon	Mount Lemmon Survey	APO	610 m	MPC · JPL
333511 Paulfleming	2005 MR_{4}	Paulfleming	June 17, 2005	Mount Lemmon	Mount Lemmon Survey	·	890 m	MPC · JPL
333512	2005 MP_{20}	—	June 30, 2005	Kitt Peak	Spacewatch	·	640 m	MPC · JPL
333513	2005 MV_{42}	—	June 29, 2005	Palomar	NEAT	·	940 m	MPC · JPL
333514 Kallemeyn	2005 NP_{10}	Kallemeyn	July 3, 2005	Mount Lemmon	Mount Lemmon Survey	·	870 m	MPC · JPL
333515	2005 NY_{60}	—	July 11, 2005	Kitt Peak	Spacewatch	·	920 m	MPC · JPL
333516	2005 NV_{82}	—	July 10, 2005	Reedy Creek	J. Broughton	·	1.2 km	MPC · JPL
333517	2005 NP_{123}	—	July 10, 2005	Siding Spring	SSS	·	810 m	MPC · JPL
333518	2005 OS_{9}	—	July 27, 2005	Palomar	NEAT	·	1.1 km	MPC · JPL
333519	2005 OC_{21}	—	July 28, 2005	Palomar	NEAT	·	1.1 km	MPC · JPL
333520	2005 OO_{25}	—	July 31, 2005	Palomar	NEAT	V	650 m	MPC · JPL
333521	2005 PO	—	August 3, 2005	Palomar	NEAT	APO · PHA	340 m	MPC · JPL
333522	2005 PB_{2}	—	August 2, 2005	Socorro	LINEAR	PHO	1.1 km	MPC · JPL
333523	2005 QD_{7}	—	August 24, 2005	Palomar	NEAT	·	1.0 km	MPC · JPL
333524	2005 QM_{17}	—	August 25, 2005	Palomar	NEAT	MAS	710 m	MPC · JPL
333525	2005 QF_{28}	—	August 27, 2005	Anderson Mesa	LONEOS	·	1.4 km	MPC · JPL
333526	2005 QT_{50}	—	August 26, 2005	Palomar	NEAT	·	1.1 km	MPC · JPL
333527	2005 QE_{171}	—	August 29, 2005	Palomar	NEAT	·	2.7 km	MPC · JPL
333528	2005 QF_{180}	—	August 27, 2005	Anderson Mesa	LONEOS	·	1.4 km	MPC · JPL
333529	2005 RA_{23}	—	September 6, 2005	Socorro	LINEAR	PHO	2.8 km	MPC · JPL
333530	2005 RJ_{25}	—	September 10, 2005	Anderson Mesa	LONEOS	·	1.6 km	MPC · JPL
333531 Prestonsherman	2005 SU_{5}	Prestonsherman	September 23, 2005	Catalina	CSS	NYS ·	1.1 km	MPC · JPL
333532	2005 SZ_{64}	—	September 26, 2005	Palomar	NEAT	·	1.1 km	MPC · JPL
333533	2005 SH_{85}	—	September 24, 2005	Kitt Peak	Spacewatch	NYS	1.0 km	MPC · JPL
333534	2005 SC_{98}	—	September 25, 2005	Kitt Peak	Spacewatch	·	1.9 km	MPC · JPL
333535	2005 SM_{119}	—	September 28, 2005	Palomar	NEAT	·	1.8 km	MPC · JPL
333536 Faelan	2005 SG_{127}	Faelan	September 29, 2005	Mount Lemmon	Mount Lemmon Survey	·	1.1 km	MPC · JPL
333537	2005 SC_{180}	—	September 29, 2005	Goodricke-Pigott	R. A. Tucker	3:2	6.1 km	MPC · JPL
333538	2005 SB_{208}	—	September 30, 2005	Kitt Peak	Spacewatch	·	1.1 km	MPC · JPL
333539 Rayfranco	2005 SU_{220}	Rayfranco	September 29, 2005	Catalina	CSS	·	1.3 km	MPC · JPL
333540	2005 SA_{253}	—	September 24, 2005	Palomar	NEAT	·	1.4 km	MPC · JPL
333541 Roissier	2005 TT_{14}	Roissier	October 3, 2005	Catalina	CSS	V	870 m	MPC · JPL
333542	2005 TS_{41}	—	October 3, 2005	Socorro	LINEAR	·	1.6 km	MPC · JPL
333543	2005 TL_{81}	—	October 3, 2005	Kitt Peak	Spacewatch	3:2	7.4 km	MPC · JPL
333544 Dubisher	2005 TR_{175}	Dubisher	October 3, 2005	Catalina	CSS	·	1.1 km	MPC · JPL
333545 Sarasanders	2005 UW_{43}	Sarasanders	October 22, 2005	Catalina	CSS	·	1.2 km	MPC · JPL
333546 Perkins	2005 UA_{44}	Perkins	October 22, 2005	Catalina	CSS	NYS	1.4 km	MPC · JPL
333547	2005 US_{76}	—	October 24, 2005	Kitt Peak	Spacewatch	·	1.5 km	MPC · JPL
333548	2005 UB_{91}	—	October 22, 2005	Kitt Peak	Spacewatch	V	950 m	MPC · JPL
333549	2005 UQ_{97}	—	October 22, 2005	Kitt Peak	Spacewatch	NYS	1.2 km	MPC · JPL
333550	2005 UJ_{108}	—	October 22, 2005	Kitt Peak	Spacewatch	NYS	1.2 km	MPC · JPL
333551 Albaugh	2005 UR_{141}	Albaugh	October 25, 2005	Catalina	CSS	·	1.5 km	MPC · JPL
333552	2005 UO_{369}	—	October 27, 2005	Kitt Peak	Spacewatch	·	1.6 km	MPC · JPL
333553 Salvador	2005 UN_{460}	Salvador	October 28, 2005	Mount Lemmon	Mount Lemmon Survey	H	470 m	MPC · JPL
333554	2005 VT_{8}	—	November 1, 2005	Kitt Peak	Spacewatch	·	1.2 km	MPC · JPL
333555	2005 VY_{17}	—	November 4, 2005	Socorro	LINEAR	AMO +1km	1.2 km	MPC · JPL
333556	2005 VV_{89}	—	November 6, 2005	Kitt Peak	Spacewatch	·	1.5 km	MPC · JPL
333557	2005 VX_{128}	—	November 1, 2005	Apache Point	A. C. Becker	·	1.7 km	MPC · JPL
333558	2005 WR_{16}	—	November 22, 2005	Kitt Peak	Spacewatch	·	1.4 km	MPC · JPL
333559	2005 WB_{58}	—	November 26, 2005	Kitt Peak	Spacewatch	H	570 m	MPC · JPL
333560	2005 XL_{73}	—	December 6, 2005	Kitt Peak	Spacewatch	·	1.5 km	MPC · JPL
333561 Plummer	2005 YP_{59}	Plummer	December 27, 2005	Catalina	CSS	·	3.7 km	MPC · JPL
333562	2005 YC_{135}	—	December 26, 2005	Kitt Peak	Spacewatch	·	2.1 km	MPC · JPL
333563	2005 YU_{168}	—	December 29, 2005	Socorro	LINEAR	H	900 m	MPC · JPL
333564	2005 YN_{189}	—	December 29, 2005	Kitt Peak	Spacewatch	·	1.4 km	MPC · JPL
333565 Rani	2006 AJ_{34}	Rani	January 6, 2006	Catalina	CSS	H	820 m	MPC · JPL
333566	2006 AY_{74}	—	January 6, 2006	Anderson Mesa	LONEOS	H	690 m	MPC · JPL
333567	2006 BN_{8}	—	January 22, 2006	Anderson Mesa	LONEOS	H	750 m	MPC · JPL
333568	2006 BL_{30}	—	January 20, 2006	Kitt Peak	Spacewatch	·	3.3 km	MPC · JPL
333569	2006 BY_{154}	—	January 25, 2006	Kitt Peak	Spacewatch	·	3.6 km	MPC · JPL
333570	2006 BO_{157}	—	January 25, 2006	Kitt Peak	Spacewatch	·	3.2 km	MPC · JPL
333571 Hanish	2006 BV_{179}	Hanish	January 27, 2006	Mount Lemmon	Mount Lemmon Survey	·	2.2 km	MPC · JPL
333572	2006 DO_{189}	—	February 27, 2006	Kitt Peak	Spacewatch	·	3.1 km	MPC · JPL
333573	2006 HY_{69}	—	April 24, 2006	Kitt Peak	Spacewatch	·	3.3 km	MPC · JPL
333574	2006 HO_{104}	—	April 30, 2006	Kitt Peak	Spacewatch	·	2.8 km	MPC · JPL
333575	2006 JU_{34}	—	May 4, 2006	Kitt Peak	Spacewatch	·	2.2 km	MPC · JPL
333576	2006 JE_{47}	—	May 10, 2006	Palomar	NEAT	·	4.1 km	MPC · JPL
333577	2006 KQ_{62}	—	May 22, 2006	Kitt Peak	Spacewatch	EOS	2.6 km	MPC · JPL
333578	2006 KM_{103}	—	May 31, 2006	Mount Lemmon	Mount Lemmon Survey	APO · PHA	200 m	MPC · JPL
333579 Rachelfunk	2006 SO_{174}	Rachelfunk	September 17, 2006	Catalina	CSS	·	1.4 km	MPC · JPL
333580	2006 SQ_{315}	—	March 10, 2005	Anderson Mesa	LONEOS	·	870 m	MPC · JPL
333581	2006 WT_{34}	—	November 16, 2006	Kitt Peak	Spacewatch	·	1.2 km	MPC · JPL
333582	2006 WK_{144}	—	November 20, 2006	Kitt Peak	Spacewatch	·	820 m	MPC · JPL
333583	2006 XE_{27}	—	December 12, 2006	Kitt Peak	Spacewatch	·	1.6 km	MPC · JPL
333584	2006 XJ_{69}	—	December 11, 2006	Kitt Peak	Spacewatch	·	1.5 km	MPC · JPL
333585	2006 YB_{1}	—	December 16, 2006	Kitt Peak	Spacewatch	·	960 m	MPC · JPL
333586 Melissarodriguez	2007 AS_{26}	Melissarodriguez	January 8, 2007	Mount Lemmon	Mount Lemmon Survey	·	1.5 km	MPC · JPL
333587	2007 BS_{16}	—	January 17, 2007	Kitt Peak	Spacewatch	MAS	890 m	MPC · JPL
333588 Ryanpaquette	2007 BL_{33}	Ryanpaquette	January 24, 2007	Mount Lemmon	Mount Lemmon Survey	V	940 m	MPC · JPL
333589	2007 CR_{9}	—	February 6, 2007	Palomar	NEAT	·	1.9 km	MPC · JPL
333590	2007 CU_{26}	—	February 9, 2007	Altschwendt	W. Ries	·	2.8 km	MPC · JPL
333591 Emilykeates	2007 CM_{29}	Emilykeates	February 6, 2007	Mount Lemmon	Mount Lemmon Survey	PHO	3.0 km	MPC · JPL
333592	2007 CP_{64}	—	February 9, 2007	Kitt Peak	Spacewatch	·	1.0 km	MPC · JPL
333593	2007 DQ_{109}	—	February 17, 2007	Kitt Peak	Spacewatch	·	1.3 km	MPC · JPL
333594 Zabala	2007 EW_{17}	Zabala	March 9, 2007	Mount Lemmon	Mount Lemmon Survey	·	1.5 km	MPC · JPL
333595	2007 ER_{96}	—	March 10, 2007	Mount Lemmon	Mount Lemmon Survey	·	3.6 km	MPC · JPL
333596	2007 EP_{99}	—	March 11, 2007	Kitt Peak	Spacewatch	·	2.3 km	MPC · JPL
333597 Alexbjurstrom	2007 FU_{16}	Alexbjurstrom	March 20, 2007	Mount Lemmon	Mount Lemmon Survey	·	1.6 km	MPC · JPL
333598	2007 FQ_{20}	—	March 11, 2007	Anderson Mesa	LONEOS	·	2.2 km	MPC · JPL
333599 Rathan	2007 GH	Rathan	April 7, 2007	Catalina	CSS	·	2.3 km	MPC · JPL
333600 Dietrich	2007 GB_{7}	Dietrich	April 7, 2007	Mount Lemmon	Mount Lemmon Survey	·	1.4 km	MPC · JPL

== 333601–333700 ==
back to top

Designation			Discovery			Properties		Ref
Permanent	Provisional	Named after	Date	Site	Discoverer(s)	Category	Diam.	Ref
333601 Curtiscalva	2007 GG_{18}	Curtiscalva	April 11, 2007	Catalina	CSS	·	1.8 km	MPC · JPL
333602	2007 GA_{27}	—	April 14, 2007	Kitt Peak	Spacewatch	·	2.3 km	MPC · JPL
333603	2007 GW_{34}	—	April 14, 2007	Kitt Peak	Spacewatch	·	1.8 km	MPC · JPL
333604	2007 GS_{44}	—	April 14, 2007	Kitt Peak	Spacewatch	·	1.7 km	MPC · JPL
333605 Martella	2007 HX_{81}	Martella	December 5, 2005	Mount Lemmon	Mount Lemmon Survey	·	1.6 km	MPC · JPL
333606	2007 JW_{35}	—	May 10, 2007	Anderson Mesa	LONEOS	·	2.7 km	MPC · JPL
333607	2007 LY	—	June 9, 2007	Vicques	M. Ory	·	2.2 km	MPC · JPL
333608 Michaelkaye	2007 LA_{3}	Michaelkaye	May 10, 2007	Mount Lemmon	Mount Lemmon Survey	EOS	2.2 km	MPC · JPL
333609	2007 LR_{11}	—	June 9, 2007	Kitt Peak	Spacewatch	·	2.0 km	MPC · JPL
333610	2007 PT_{24}	—	August 12, 2007	Socorro	LINEAR	·	6.4 km	MPC · JPL
333611	2007 QC_{16}	—	August 23, 2007	Siding Spring	SSS	·	3.9 km	MPC · JPL
333612	2007 RB_{11}	—	September 5, 2007	Siding Spring	K. Sárneczky, L. Kiss	·	3.3 km	MPC · JPL
333613 Hasten	2007 RW_{227}	Hasten	September 10, 2007	Mount Lemmon	Mount Lemmon Survey	·	1.5 km	MPC · JPL
333614 Boyd	2007 RN_{247}	Boyd	September 13, 2007	Mount Lemmon	Mount Lemmon Survey	·	4.8 km	MPC · JPL
333615	2007 SD_{1}	—	September 19, 2007	Mayhill	Lowe, A.	·	4.4 km	MPC · JPL
333616	2007 TX_{19}	—	October 6, 2007	Socorro	LINEAR	·	2.8 km	MPC · JPL
333617 Markjohnson	2007 TX_{82}	Markjohnson	October 8, 2007	Catalina	CSS	EOS	2.5 km	MPC · JPL
333618	2007 TJ_{325}	—	October 11, 2007	Kitt Peak	Spacewatch	·	2.2 km	MPC · JPL
333619	2007 TP_{374}	—	September 9, 2007	Kitt Peak	Spacewatch	·	3.0 km	MPC · JPL
333620 Scottfrancis	2007 TP_{393}	Scottfrancis	October 14, 2007	Catalina	CSS	·	3.6 km	MPC · JPL
333621	2007 VS_{1}	—	November 2, 2007	Socorro	LINEAR	H	730 m	MPC · JPL
333622	2007 VZ_{4}	—	November 2, 2007	Tiki	Teamo, N.	LIX	3.5 km	MPC · JPL
333623	2007 VD_{5}	—	November 3, 2007	Dauban	Chante-Perdrix	·	3.9 km	MPC · JPL
333624	2007 VW_{93}	—	November 6, 2007	Needville	J. Dellinger, P. G. A. Garossino	SYL · CYB	6.1 km	MPC · JPL
333625	2007 VB_{111}	—	November 3, 2007	Kitt Peak	Spacewatch	CYB	5.0 km	MPC · JPL
333626 Huerta	2008 AT_{10}	Huerta	January 10, 2008	Mount Lemmon	Mount Lemmon Survey	·	2.4 km	MPC · JPL
333627 Zacharyrule	2008 ED_{43}	Zacharyrule	March 4, 2008	Mount Lemmon	Mount Lemmon Survey	NYS	1.1 km	MPC · JPL
333628	2008 EQ_{88}	—	March 7, 2008	Socorro	LINEAR	·	830 m	MPC · JPL
333629	2008 EF_{168}	—	March 10, 2008	Kitt Peak	Spacewatch	·	980 m	MPC · JPL
333630	2008 FX_{15}	—	March 26, 2008	Kitt Peak	Spacewatch	·	1.2 km	MPC · JPL
333631 Arivogel	2008 GN_{50}	Arivogel	April 5, 2008	Mount Lemmon	Mount Lemmon Survey	·	1.2 km	MPC · JPL
333632 Athipathi	2008 GH_{52}	Athipathi	April 5, 2008	Mount Lemmon	Mount Lemmon Survey	NYS	920 m	MPC · JPL
333633	2008 GR_{97}	—	April 8, 2008	Kitt Peak	Spacewatch	·	1.1 km	MPC · JPL
333634 Maryhinkle	2008 GG_{128}	Maryhinkle	April 9, 2008	Catalina	CSS	PHO	1.4 km	MPC · JPL
333635	2008 KT_{39}	—	May 31, 2008	Kitt Peak	Spacewatch	·	940 m	MPC · JPL
333636 Reboul	2008 QF_{7}	Reboul	August 26, 2008	Parc National des Cévennes	C. Demeautis, J.-M. Lopez	·	1.4 km	MPC · JPL
333637	2008 QZ_{10}	—	August 26, 2008	La Sagra	OAM	·	1.7 km	MPC · JPL
333638	2008 QL_{11}	—	August 26, 2008	Dauban	Kugel, F.	ADE	2.5 km	MPC · JPL
333639 Yaima	2008 QL_{16}	Yaima	August 21, 2008	Ishigakijima	Ishigakijima	MAR	1.2 km	MPC · JPL
333640	2008 QB_{22}	—	August 26, 2008	Socorro	LINEAR	·	1.5 km	MPC · JPL
333641	2008 QH_{22}	—	August 26, 2008	Socorro	LINEAR	·	2.7 km	MPC · JPL
333642	2008 QC_{29}	—	August 30, 2008	Socorro	LINEAR	EUN	1.5 km	MPC · JPL
333643	2008 QM_{32}	—	August 30, 2008	Socorro	LINEAR	·	2.7 km	MPC · JPL
333644	2008 QZ_{37}	—	August 23, 2008	Kitt Peak	Spacewatch	·	1.9 km	MPC · JPL
333645	2008 RM_{2}	—	September 2, 2008	Kitt Peak	Spacewatch	·	1.3 km	MPC · JPL
333646	2008 RT_{16}	—	September 4, 2008	Kitt Peak	Spacewatch	·	2.1 km	MPC · JPL
333647	2008 RB_{74}	—	September 6, 2008	Catalina	CSS	·	1.6 km	MPC · JPL
333648	2008 RJ_{107}	—	September 7, 2008	Catalina	CSS	·	2.5 km	MPC · JPL
333649	2008 RG_{117}	—	September 9, 2008	Catalina	CSS	EUN	1.8 km	MPC · JPL
333650	2008 SG_{5}	—	September 22, 2008	Socorro	LINEAR	·	3.8 km	MPC · JPL
333651	2008 SV_{6}	—	January 31, 2006	Kitt Peak	Spacewatch	·	1.8 km	MPC · JPL
333652	2008 SP_{12}	—	September 20, 2008	Mount Lemmon	Mount Lemmon Survey	·	2.3 km	MPC · JPL
333653	2008 SN_{29}	—	September 19, 2008	Kitt Peak	Spacewatch	AGN	1.6 km	MPC · JPL
333654	2008 SK_{43}	—	March 10, 2007	Kitt Peak	Spacewatch	·	1.3 km	MPC · JPL
333655	2008 SU_{51}	—	September 20, 2008	Mount Lemmon	Mount Lemmon Survey	·	1.8 km	MPC · JPL
333656	2008 SE_{60}	—	September 20, 2008	Mount Lemmon	Mount Lemmon Survey	·	2.8 km	MPC · JPL
333657	2008 SS_{60}	—	September 20, 2008	Mount Lemmon	Mount Lemmon Survey	·	2.2 km	MPC · JPL
333658	2008 SJ_{74}	—	September 23, 2008	Catalina	CSS	·	2.8 km	MPC · JPL
333659	2008 SD_{146}	—	September 5, 2008	Kitt Peak	Spacewatch	·	1.9 km	MPC · JPL
333660	2008 ST_{161}	—	September 28, 2008	Socorro	LINEAR	·	1.4 km	MPC · JPL
333661	2008 SU_{163}	—	September 28, 2008	Socorro	LINEAR	JUN	1.3 km	MPC · JPL
333662	2008 SB_{174}	—	September 22, 2008	Catalina	CSS	·	2.8 km	MPC · JPL
333663	2008 SZ_{240}	—	September 29, 2008	Catalina	CSS	(12739)	2.1 km	MPC · JPL
333664	2008 ST_{244}	—	September 29, 2008	Catalina	CSS	·	1.9 km	MPC · JPL
333665	2008 SB_{249}	—	September 21, 2008	Catalina	CSS	·	1.8 km	MPC · JPL
333666	2008 SR_{282}	—	September 24, 2008	Catalina	CSS	·	2.7 km	MPC · JPL
333667	2008 SQ_{284}	—	September 24, 2008	Kitt Peak	Spacewatch	MRX	1.3 km	MPC · JPL
333668	2008 SK_{291}	—	September 22, 2008	Catalina	CSS	·	2.5 km	MPC · JPL
333669	2008 SC_{295}	—	September 23, 2008	Catalina	CSS	JUN	1.4 km	MPC · JPL
333670	2008 SC_{302}	—	September 23, 2008	Mount Lemmon	Mount Lemmon Survey	·	2.7 km	MPC · JPL
333671	2008 SG_{306}	—	September 28, 2008	Catalina	CSS	·	1.9 km	MPC · JPL
333672	2008 TE_{29}	—	October 1, 2008	Mount Lemmon	Mount Lemmon Survey	·	1.6 km	MPC · JPL
333673	2008 TG_{29}	—	October 1, 2008	Goodricke-Pigott	R. A. Tucker	(5)	1.3 km	MPC · JPL
333674	2008 TC_{52}	—	October 2, 2008	Kitt Peak	Spacewatch	·	3.4 km	MPC · JPL
333675	2008 TK_{80}	—	October 2, 2008	Mount Lemmon	Mount Lemmon Survey	NEM	2.5 km	MPC · JPL
333676	2008 TG_{121}	—	October 7, 2008	Mount Lemmon	Mount Lemmon Survey	·	2.5 km	MPC · JPL
333677	2008 TK_{128}	—	October 8, 2008	Catalina	CSS	·	1.8 km	MPC · JPL
333678	2008 TT_{129}	—	October 8, 2008	Mount Lemmon	Mount Lemmon Survey	·	2.3 km	MPC · JPL
333679	2008 TF_{163}	—	October 1, 2008	Catalina	CSS	·	1.5 km	MPC · JPL
333680	2008 TV_{172}	—	October 6, 2008	Catalina	CSS	·	2.7 km	MPC · JPL
333681	2008 TT_{174}	—	October 7, 2008	Mount Lemmon	Mount Lemmon Survey	·	2.5 km	MPC · JPL
333682	2008 TK_{181}	—	October 8, 2008	Catalina	CSS	·	2.9 km	MPC · JPL
333683	2008 TL_{181}	—	October 9, 2008	Catalina	CSS	·	2.4 km	MPC · JPL
333684	2008 UJ_{27}	—	October 20, 2008	Kitt Peak	Spacewatch	·	2.1 km	MPC · JPL
333685	2008 UU_{90}	—	October 20, 2008	Kitt Peak	Spacewatch	·	1.9 km	MPC · JPL
333686	2008 UC_{92}	—	October 28, 2008	Mount Lemmon	Mount Lemmon Survey	T_{j} (2.98) · EUP	6.9 km	MPC · JPL
333687	2008 UU_{93}	—	October 25, 2008	Socorro	LINEAR	·	2.8 km	MPC · JPL
333688	2008 UU_{108}	—	October 21, 2008	Kitt Peak	Spacewatch	·	2.2 km	MPC · JPL
333689	2008 UG_{121}	—	October 22, 2008	Kitt Peak	Spacewatch	EMA	5.0 km	MPC · JPL
333690	2008 UC_{170}	—	September 23, 2008	Kitt Peak	Spacewatch	·	2.7 km	MPC · JPL
333691	2008 UE_{176}	—	October 24, 2008	Mount Lemmon	Mount Lemmon Survey	·	3.0 km	MPC · JPL
333692	2008 UN_{182}	—	October 24, 2008	Mount Lemmon	Mount Lemmon Survey	KOR	1.5 km	MPC · JPL
333693	2008 UG_{217}	—	October 9, 2008	Mount Lemmon	Mount Lemmon Survey	·	3.0 km	MPC · JPL
333694	2008 UM_{241}	—	October 1, 2008	Catalina	CSS	·	3.0 km	MPC · JPL
333695	2008 UL_{280}	—	October 28, 2008	Catalina	CSS	·	2.5 km	MPC · JPL
333696	2008 UG_{315}	—	October 30, 2008	Kitt Peak	Spacewatch	·	2.4 km	MPC · JPL
333697	2008 UG_{364}	—	October 27, 2008	Catalina	CSS	·	2.5 km	MPC · JPL
333698	2008 VM_{19}	—	November 1, 2008	Catalina	CSS	·	2.4 km	MPC · JPL
333699	2008 WU_{7}	—	November 17, 2008	Kitt Peak	Spacewatch	·	2.0 km	MPC · JPL
333700	2008 WP_{18}	—	November 17, 2008	Kitt Peak	Spacewatch	·	2.2 km	MPC · JPL

== 333701–333800 ==
back to top

Designation			Discovery			Properties		Ref
Permanent	Provisional	Named after	Date	Site	Discoverer(s)	Category	Diam.	Ref
333701	2008 WK_{59}	—	November 18, 2008	Socorro	LINEAR	·	2.0 km	MPC · JPL
333702	2008 WK_{98}	—	November 24, 2008	Mount Lemmon	Mount Lemmon Survey	·	2.5 km	MPC · JPL
333703	2008 WB_{141}	—	November 1, 2008	Mount Lemmon	Mount Lemmon Survey	TEL	1.8 km	MPC · JPL
333704	2008 XZ_{2}	—	December 1, 2008	Dauban	Kugel, F.	KOR	1.7 km	MPC · JPL
333705	2008 XL_{14}	—	December 1, 2008	Kitt Peak	Spacewatch	·	2.4 km	MPC · JPL
333706	2008 XQ_{46}	—	December 5, 2008	Kitt Peak	Spacewatch	·	3.6 km	MPC · JPL
333707	2008 YT_{30}	—	December 31, 2008	Kitt Peak	Spacewatch	APO	460 m	MPC · JPL
333708	2008 YZ_{58}	—	December 30, 2008	Kitt Peak	Spacewatch	·	5.8 km	MPC · JPL
333709	2008 YD_{122}	—	December 30, 2008	Kitt Peak	Spacewatch	CYB	6.5 km	MPC · JPL
333710	2009 AX_{5}	—	January 1, 2009	Kitt Peak	Spacewatch	·	3.0 km	MPC · JPL
333711	2009 BT_{3}	—	January 18, 2009	Socorro	LINEAR	·	4.4 km	MPC · JPL
333712	2009 DW_{16}	—	February 18, 2009	La Sagra	OAM	·	5.1 km	MPC · JPL
333713	2009 DJ_{138}	—	February 20, 2009	Kitt Peak	Spacewatch	·	1.9 km	MPC · JPL
333714	2009 QN_{57}	—	August 20, 2009	Kitt Peak	Spacewatch	·	770 m	MPC · JPL
333715	2009 RD_{10}	—	September 12, 2009	Kitt Peak	Spacewatch	·	630 m	MPC · JPL
333716	2009 RG_{52}	—	September 15, 2009	Kitt Peak	Spacewatch	·	970 m	MPC · JPL
333717 Alexgreaves	2009 SE_{41}	Alexgreaves	September 16, 2009	Mayhill	Falla, N.	·	740 m	MPC · JPL
333718	2009 SZ_{59}	—	September 17, 2009	Kitt Peak	Spacewatch	·	720 m	MPC · JPL
333719	2009 SC_{117}	—	September 18, 2009	Kitt Peak	Spacewatch	·	580 m	MPC · JPL
333720	2009 SR_{148}	—	September 19, 2009	Moletai	K. Černis, Zdanavicius, J.	·	770 m	MPC · JPL
333721	2009 SG_{310}	—	September 18, 2009	Kitt Peak	Spacewatch	·	750 m	MPC · JPL
333722	2009 SX_{325}	—	September 27, 2009	Mount Lemmon	Mount Lemmon Survey	·	1.6 km	MPC · JPL
333723	2009 TT_{22}	—	October 14, 2009	La Sagra	OAM	·	860 m	MPC · JPL
333724	2009 TG_{35}	—	October 14, 2009	La Sagra	OAM	·	900 m	MPC · JPL
333725	2009 TX_{39}	—	October 14, 2009	La Sagra	OAM	·	1.0 km	MPC · JPL
333726	2009 US_{14}	—	October 19, 2009	Dauban	Kugel, F.	·	1.0 km	MPC · JPL
333727	2009 UM_{59}	—	April 14, 2005	Kitt Peak	Spacewatch	·	760 m	MPC · JPL
333728	2009 UQ_{87}	—	September 23, 2009	Mount Lemmon	Mount Lemmon Survey	·	1.0 km	MPC · JPL
333729	2009 UJ_{106}	—	October 21, 2009	Mount Lemmon	Mount Lemmon Survey	MAS	790 m	MPC · JPL
333730	2009 UN_{110}	—	October 23, 2009	Kitt Peak	Spacewatch	·	790 m	MPC · JPL
333731	2009 VF_{31}	—	November 9, 2009	Mount Lemmon	Mount Lemmon Survey	·	1.4 km	MPC · JPL
333732	2009 VN_{41}	—	November 9, 2009	Catalina	CSS	·	990 m	MPC · JPL
333733	2009 VV_{71}	—	November 11, 2009	Kitt Peak	Spacewatch	fast?	840 m	MPC · JPL
333734	2009 VS_{107}	—	November 8, 2009	Mount Lemmon	Mount Lemmon Survey	·	1.6 km	MPC · JPL
333735	2009 VB_{110}	—	November 9, 2009	Mount Lemmon	Mount Lemmon Survey	·	930 m	MPC · JPL
333736	2009 WX_{40}	—	November 17, 2009	Kitt Peak	Spacewatch	EUN	1.9 km	MPC · JPL
333737	2009 WM_{100}	—	November 21, 2009	Mount Lemmon	Mount Lemmon Survey	·	3.9 km	MPC · JPL
333738	2009 WE_{170}	—	November 22, 2009	Kitt Peak	Spacewatch	·	1.3 km	MPC · JPL
333739	2009 WO_{180}	—	November 23, 2009	Kitt Peak	Spacewatch	NYS	1.0 km	MPC · JPL
333740	2009 XB	—	December 5, 2009	Pla D'Arguines	R. Ferrando	·	2.0 km	MPC · JPL
333741	2009 XM_{5}	—	May 2, 2003	Kitt Peak	Spacewatch	·	1.8 km	MPC · JPL
333742	2009 XT_{16}	—	December 15, 2009	Mount Lemmon	Mount Lemmon Survey	MAR	1.3 km	MPC · JPL
333743	2009 YQ_{5}	—	December 17, 2009	Mount Lemmon	Mount Lemmon Survey	·	850 m	MPC · JPL
333744 Pau	2009 YW_{6}	Pau	December 20, 2009	SM Montmagastrell	Bosch, J. M.	·	1.8 km	MPC · JPL
333745	2010 AP_{41}	—	December 19, 2009	Kitt Peak	Spacewatch	·	2.8 km	MPC · JPL
333746	2010 AJ_{46}	—	October 1, 2008	Mount Lemmon	Mount Lemmon Survey	·	2.2 km	MPC · JPL
333747	2010 AM_{74}	—	January 13, 2010	Socorro	LINEAR	·	3.5 km	MPC · JPL
333748	2010 AF_{75}	—	December 18, 2009	Kitt Peak	Spacewatch	·	4.6 km	MPC · JPL
333749	2010 AT_{80}	—	January 7, 2010	Kitt Peak	Spacewatch	·	1.9 km	MPC · JPL
333750	2010 BB_{2}	—	January 17, 2010	Dauban	Kugel, F.	·	2.3 km	MPC · JPL
333751	2010 EL_{2}	—	March 3, 2010	Nazaret	Muler, G.	·	2.8 km	MPC · JPL
333752	2010 EM_{43}	—	March 4, 2005	Mount Lemmon	Mount Lemmon Survey	HYG	2.7 km	MPC · JPL
333753	2010 FH_{57}	—	March 18, 2010	Mount Lemmon	Mount Lemmon Survey	(1298)	3.8 km	MPC · JPL
333754	2010 UZ_{65}	—	October 6, 2005	Mount Lemmon	Mount Lemmon Survey	·	2.0 km	MPC · JPL
333755	2010 VC_{1}	—	November 2, 2010	Catalina	CSS	APO	480 m	MPC · JPL
333756	2011 AK_{42}	—	April 10, 2002	Socorro	LINEAR	·	800 m	MPC · JPL
333757	2011 AE_{49}	—	September 15, 2007	Catalina	CSS	H	800 m	MPC · JPL
333758	2011 BD_{75}	—	September 21, 2001	Socorro	LINEAR	·	1.4 km	MPC · JPL
333759	2011 BT_{78}	—	January 9, 2007	Kitt Peak	Spacewatch	·	3.6 km	MPC · JPL
333760	2011 BS_{83}	—	March 14, 2007	Catalina	CSS	JUN	1.6 km	MPC · JPL
333761	2011 BV_{99}	—	August 29, 2005	Kitt Peak	Spacewatch	·	1.3 km	MPC · JPL
333762	2011 CM_{31}	—	February 12, 2004	Kitt Peak	Spacewatch	·	1.1 km	MPC · JPL
333763	2011 CF_{36}	—	January 2, 1998	Kitt Peak	Spacewatch	·	630 m	MPC · JPL
333764	2011 CV_{41}	—	January 27, 2007	Mount Lemmon	Mount Lemmon Survey	·	1.4 km	MPC · JPL
333765	2011 CA_{47}	—	December 28, 2005	Kitt Peak	Spacewatch	·	2.6 km	MPC · JPL
333766	2011 CH_{82}	—	June 29, 2005	Palomar	NEAT	·	870 m	MPC · JPL
333767	2011 DH_{6}	—	January 31, 1997	Kitt Peak	Spacewatch	·	2.9 km	MPC · JPL
333768	2011 ER	—	July 4, 2005	Palomar	NEAT	·	1.2 km	MPC · JPL
333769	2011 EN_{7}	—	December 3, 2005	Mauna Kea	A. Boattini	·	3.3 km	MPC · JPL
333770	2011 EA_{26}	—	May 17, 2007	Catalina	CSS	·	2.8 km	MPC · JPL
333771	2011 EP_{30}	—	November 16, 2006	Mount Lemmon	Mount Lemmon Survey	V	820 m	MPC · JPL
333772	2011 EG_{43}	—	October 23, 2003	Kitt Peak	Spacewatch	·	2.2 km	MPC · JPL
333773	2011 EP_{50}	—	February 19, 2010	Mount Lemmon	Mount Lemmon Survey	·	5.0 km	MPC · JPL
333774	2011 EJ_{53}	—	October 18, 2003	Anderson Mesa	LONEOS	615	1.8 km	MPC · JPL
333775	2011 EJ_{65}	—	January 27, 2006	Mount Lemmon	Mount Lemmon Survey	·	1.8 km	MPC · JPL
333776	2011 ER_{65}	—	October 23, 2003	Kitt Peak	Spacewatch	·	4.1 km	MPC · JPL
333777	2011 EL_{82}	—	November 10, 2005	Kitt Peak	Spacewatch	·	2.0 km	MPC · JPL
333778	2011 FP_{6}	—	April 25, 2007	Kitt Peak	Spacewatch	·	1.6 km	MPC · JPL
333779	2011 FK_{12}	—	September 5, 2000	Kitt Peak	Spacewatch	·	1.8 km	MPC · JPL
333780	2011 FK_{35}	—	May 29, 2008	Mount Lemmon	Mount Lemmon Survey	GEF	1.6 km	MPC · JPL
333781	2011 FO_{66}	—	September 27, 2003	Kitt Peak	Spacewatch	·	2.2 km	MPC · JPL
333782	2011 FH_{83}	—	December 8, 2005	Kitt Peak	Spacewatch	NYS	2.0 km	MPC · JPL
333783	2011 FP_{100}	—	January 6, 2006	Catalina	CSS	·	2.8 km	MPC · JPL
333784	2011 FM_{123}	—	June 27, 2008	Siding Spring	SSS	·	1.9 km	MPC · JPL
333785	2011 FV_{133}	—	September 4, 2008	Kitt Peak	Spacewatch	·	2.9 km	MPC · JPL
333786	2011 FZ_{146}	—	September 11, 2001	Anderson Mesa	LONEOS	V	850 m	MPC · JPL
333787	2011 GZ_{21}	—	April 15, 1994	Kitt Peak	Spacewatch	·	4.2 km	MPC · JPL
333788	2011 GZ_{64}	—	March 9, 2002	Anderson Mesa	LONEOS	·	3.0 km	MPC · JPL
333789	2011 GF_{67}	—	February 28, 2006	Catalina	CSS	·	3.6 km	MPC · JPL
333790	2011 GJ_{75}	—	June 12, 2007	Kitt Peak	Spacewatch	·	2.7 km	MPC · JPL
333791	2011 GK_{82}	—	September 22, 2008	Socorro	LINEAR	·	2.5 km	MPC · JPL
333792	2011 GS_{82}	—	April 13, 2002	Palomar	NEAT	NEM	3.2 km	MPC · JPL
333793	2011 GF_{84}	—	March 5, 2002	Apache Point	SDSS	(5)	1.7 km	MPC · JPL
333794	2011 HT_{4}	—	October 27, 2008	Mount Lemmon	Mount Lemmon Survey	·	4.4 km	MPC · JPL
333795	2011 HE_{10}	—	January 11, 2010	Kitt Peak	Spacewatch	·	3.6 km	MPC · JPL
333796	2011 HX_{24}	—	January 17, 2004	Kitt Peak	Spacewatch	·	4.7 km	MPC · JPL
333797	2011 HY_{33}	—	December 28, 2003	Kitt Peak	Spacewatch	·	4.1 km	MPC · JPL
333798	2011 HF_{34}	—	August 22, 2001	Kitt Peak	Spacewatch	THM	2.6 km	MPC · JPL
333799	2011 HE_{48}	—	May 23, 2006	Kitt Peak	Spacewatch	·	3.3 km	MPC · JPL
333800	2011 HO_{48}	—	September 20, 2007	Kitt Peak	Spacewatch	·	3.7 km	MPC · JPL

== 333801–333900 ==
back to top

Designation			Discovery			Properties		Ref
Permanent	Provisional	Named after	Date	Site	Discoverer(s)	Category	Diam.	Ref
333801	2011 HG_{60}	—	September 20, 2001	Socorro	LINEAR	VER	3.0 km	MPC · JPL
333802	2011 HY_{75}	—	September 15, 2007	Mount Lemmon	Mount Lemmon Survey	·	2.5 km	MPC · JPL
333803	2011 HJ_{99}	—	September 12, 2007	Mount Lemmon	Mount Lemmon Survey	(43176)	3.4 km	MPC · JPL
333804	2011 HE_{100}	—	September 12, 2005	Kitt Peak	Spacewatch	·	930 m	MPC · JPL
333805	2011 HN_{100}	—	January 5, 2002	Palomar	NEAT	·	2.2 km	MPC · JPL
333806	2011 JY	—	February 3, 2000	Socorro	LINEAR	·	3.7 km	MPC · JPL
333807	2011 JX_{6}	—	February 13, 2004	Kitt Peak	Spacewatch	ELF	6.0 km	MPC · JPL
333808	2011 JZ_{17}	—	November 26, 1995	Xinglong	SCAP	·	2.6 km	MPC · JPL
333809	2011 SJ_{164}	—	October 19, 2000	Kitt Peak	Spacewatch	·	1.7 km	MPC · JPL
333810	2011 UB_{156}	—	November 1, 2007	Kitt Peak	Spacewatch	MAR	1.3 km	MPC · JPL
333811	2011 WA_{64}	—	September 28, 2006	Kitt Peak	Spacewatch	PAD	1.9 km	MPC · JPL
333812	2012 BS_{132}	—	April 1, 2004	Siding Spring	SSS	·	2.6 km	MPC · JPL
333813	2012 CV_{14}	—	January 29, 1995	Kitt Peak	Spacewatch	·	630 m	MPC · JPL
333814	2012 EU_{10}	—	October 6, 2004	Kitt Peak	Spacewatch	·	2.0 km	MPC · JPL
333815	2012 FD_{27}	—	August 9, 2002	Cerro Tololo	Deep Ecliptic Survey	·	2.9 km	MPC · JPL
333816	2012 FZ_{38}	—	August 31, 2005	Kitt Peak	Spacewatch	·	1.3 km	MPC · JPL
333817	2012 FN_{39}	—	January 29, 1995	Kitt Peak	Spacewatch	·	3.9 km	MPC · JPL
333818	2012 GG_{28}	—	April 23, 1996	Kitt Peak	Spacewatch	·	3.3 km	MPC · JPL
333819	2012 HR_{21}	—	March 9, 2003	Anderson Mesa	LONEOS	EUN	1.9 km	MPC · JPL
333820	2012 HK_{39}	—	February 21, 2003	Palomar	NEAT	JUN	1.4 km	MPC · JPL
333821	2012 HJ_{49}	—	December 10, 2005	Kitt Peak	Spacewatch	·	3.3 km	MPC · JPL
333822	2012 HO_{57}	—	April 28, 2008	Mount Lemmon	Mount Lemmon Survey	·	1.4 km	MPC · JPL
333823	2012 HX_{61}	—	March 26, 1995	Kitt Peak	Spacewatch	·	860 m	MPC · JPL
333824	2012 HM_{62}	—	February 5, 2000	Kitt Peak	Spacewatch	·	1.2 km	MPC · JPL
333825	2012 HZ_{70}	—	May 3, 2008	Kitt Peak	Spacewatch	·	1.7 km	MPC · JPL
333826	2012 HF_{78}	—	October 19, 2003	Kitt Peak	Spacewatch	VER	4.7 km	MPC · JPL
333827	2012 JR_{22}	—	October 15, 2004	Kitt Peak	Spacewatch	EOS	4.7 km	MPC · JPL
333828	2012 JM_{24}	—	November 22, 2006	Kitt Peak	Spacewatch	·	1.6 km	MPC · JPL
333829	2012 JO_{24}	—	May 25, 2007	Mount Lemmon	Mount Lemmon Survey	HYG	4.6 km	MPC · JPL
333830	2012 JB_{25}	—	September 16, 2009	Kitt Peak	Spacewatch	·	1.7 km	MPC · JPL
333831	2012 JF_{46}	—	May 8, 1999	Socorro	CSS	·	2.3 km	MPC · JPL
333832	2012 JL_{46}	—	May 13, 1996	Kitt Peak	Spacewatch	·	4.8 km	MPC · JPL
333833	2012 JJ_{66}	—	November 27, 2000	Kitt Peak	Spacewatch	·	3.2 km	MPC · JPL
333834	2012 KZ_{10}	—	May 23, 2001	Apache Point	SDSS	·	5.7 km	MPC · JPL
333835	2012 KU_{28}	—	December 11, 2004	Kitt Peak	Spacewatch	·	3.5 km	MPC · JPL
333836	2012 KN_{50}	—	July 14, 2004	Socorro	LINEAR	·	1.5 km	MPC · JPL
333837	2012 LU_{11}	—	December 13, 1999	Kitt Peak	Spacewatch	EOS	2.5 km	MPC · JPL
333838	2012 LL_{24}	—	December 19, 2003	Kitt Peak	Spacewatch	·	4.1 km	MPC · JPL
333839	2012 MX_{5}	—	June 2, 2002	Palomar	NEAT	·	820 m	MPC · JPL
333840	2012 MT_{6}	—	September 18, 2004	Socorro	LINEAR	·	1.8 km	MPC · JPL
333841	1121 T-3	—	October 17, 1977	Palomar	C. J. van Houten, I. van Houten-Groeneveld, T. Gehrels	·	1.7 km	MPC · JPL
333842	1960 SV	—	September 24, 1960	Palomar	L. D. Schmadel, Stoss, R.	·	1.1 km	MPC · JPL
333843	1990 SH_{4}	—	September 17, 1990	Kitt Peak	Spacewatch	·	850 m	MPC · JPL
333844	1990 WQ	—	November 18, 1990	La Silla	E. W. Elst	·	2.0 km	MPC · JPL
333845	1991 TD_{10}	—	October 10, 1991	Kitt Peak	Spacewatch	·	1.6 km	MPC · JPL
333846	1992 SL_{11}	—	September 28, 1992	Kitt Peak	Spacewatch	·	980 m	MPC · JPL
333847	1993 YB	—	December 16, 1993	Kitt Peak	Spacewatch	H	630 m	MPC · JPL
333848	1994 SN_{1}	—	September 27, 1994	Kitt Peak	Spacewatch	·	2.0 km	MPC · JPL
333849	1994 UE_{9}	—	October 28, 1994	Kitt Peak	Spacewatch	HOF	2.6 km	MPC · JPL
333850	1995 CH_{5}	—	February 1, 1995	Kitt Peak	Spacewatch	·	1.2 km	MPC · JPL
333851	1995 FA_{6}	—	March 23, 1995	Kitt Peak	Spacewatch	·	1.5 km	MPC · JPL
333852	1995 FK_{15}	—	March 27, 1995	Kitt Peak	Spacewatch	·	660 m	MPC · JPL
333853	1995 SV_{8}	—	September 17, 1995	Kitt Peak	Spacewatch	·	770 m	MPC · JPL
333854	1995 SE_{12}	—	September 18, 1995	Kitt Peak	Spacewatch	·	1.7 km	MPC · JPL
333855	1995 SD_{37}	—	September 24, 1995	Kitt Peak	Spacewatch	·	890 m	MPC · JPL
333856	1995 SL_{63}	—	September 25, 1995	Kitt Peak	Spacewatch	·	710 m	MPC · JPL
333857	1995 SY_{64}	—	September 19, 1995	Kitt Peak	Spacewatch	·	650 m	MPC · JPL
333858	1995 SW_{69}	—	September 19, 1995	Kitt Peak	Spacewatch	·	1.9 km	MPC · JPL
333859	1995 TB_{11}	—	October 15, 1995	Kitt Peak	Spacewatch	·	1.8 km	MPC · JPL
333860	1995 UM_{40}	—	October 23, 1995	Kitt Peak	Spacewatch	·	1.7 km	MPC · JPL
333861	1995 UV_{40}	—	October 23, 1995	Kitt Peak	Spacewatch	·	3.1 km	MPC · JPL
333862	1995 WF_{1}	—	November 16, 1995	Kuma Kogen	A. Nakamura	·	590 m	MPC · JPL
333863	1995 WK_{14}	—	November 16, 1995	Kitt Peak	Spacewatch	·	3.2 km	MPC · JPL
333864	1996 AT_{6}	—	January 12, 1996	Kitt Peak	Spacewatch	·	1.5 km	MPC · JPL
333865	1996 AM_{19}	—	January 15, 1996	Kitt Peak	Spacewatch	·	2.0 km	MPC · JPL
333866	1996 EZ_{6}	—	March 11, 1996	Kitt Peak	Spacewatch	615	1.7 km	MPC · JPL
333867	1996 RH_{8}	—	September 6, 1996	Kitt Peak	Spacewatch	EOS	2.3 km	MPC · JPL
333868	1996 TA_{16}	—	October 4, 1996	Kitt Peak	Spacewatch	·	3.2 km	MPC · JPL
333869	1996 TQ_{33}	—	October 10, 1996	Kitt Peak	Spacewatch	·	3.4 km	MPC · JPL
333870	1997 ES_{12}	—	March 3, 1997	Kitt Peak	Spacewatch	·	870 m	MPC · JPL
333871	1997 EP_{31}	—	March 10, 1997	Kitt Peak	Spacewatch	·	2.6 km	MPC · JPL
333872	1997 HY_{2}	—	April 28, 1997	Kitt Peak	Spacewatch	·	890 m	MPC · JPL
333873	1997 SN_{5}	—	September 28, 1997	Needville	W. G. Dillon, R. Pepper	NYS	1.3 km	MPC · JPL
333874	1997 SH_{23}	—	September 29, 1997	Kitt Peak	Spacewatch	(5)	1.6 km	MPC · JPL
333875	1997 SP_{23}	—	September 29, 1997	Kitt Peak	Spacewatch	·	830 m	MPC · JPL
333876	1997 SY_{27}	—	September 30, 1997	Kitt Peak	Spacewatch	V	820 m	MPC · JPL
333877	1997 TM_{9}	—	October 2, 1997	Kitt Peak	Spacewatch	·	2.7 km	MPC · JPL
333878	1997 WF_{7}	—	November 24, 1997	Kitt Peak	Spacewatch	·	7.2 km	MPC · JPL
333879	1997 WG_{24}	—	November 22, 1997	Kitt Peak	Spacewatch	·	3.5 km	MPC · JPL
333880	1997 YV_{12}	—	December 27, 1997	Kitt Peak	Spacewatch	·	3.0 km	MPC · JPL
333881	1998 BX_{44}	—	January 22, 1998	Kitt Peak	Spacewatch	·	4.1 km	MPC · JPL
333882	1998 HP_{10}	—	April 17, 1998	Kitt Peak	Spacewatch	·	1.7 km	MPC · JPL
333883	1998 HU_{30}	—	April 20, 1998	Kitt Peak	Spacewatch	EUN	1.3 km	MPC · JPL
333884	1998 HS_{50}	—	April 29, 1998	Kitt Peak	Spacewatch	·	1.2 km	MPC · JPL
333885	1998 QC_{74}	—	August 24, 1998	Socorro	LINEAR	·	4.6 km	MPC · JPL
333886	1998 RN_{43}	—	September 14, 1998	Socorro	LINEAR	·	930 m	MPC · JPL
333887	1998 RX_{50}	—	September 14, 1998	Socorro	LINEAR	V	910 m	MPC · JPL
333888	1998 ST_{4}	—	September 19, 1998	Socorro	LINEAR	AMO +1km	1.5 km	MPC · JPL
333889	1998 SV_{4}	—	September 19, 1998	Socorro	LINEAR	ATE +1km	920 m	MPC · JPL
333890	1998 SK_{24}	—	September 17, 1998	Anderson Mesa	LONEOS	·	1.2 km	MPC · JPL
333891	1998 SO_{46}	—	September 25, 1998	Kitt Peak	Spacewatch	·	890 m	MPC · JPL
333892	1998 SP_{51}	—	September 27, 1998	Kitt Peak	Spacewatch	·	1.2 km	MPC · JPL
333893	1998 SA_{53}	—	September 30, 1998	Kitt Peak	Spacewatch	·	1.0 km	MPC · JPL
333894	1998 SM_{85}	—	September 26, 1998	Socorro	LINEAR	·	980 m	MPC · JPL
333895	1999 BV_{30}	—	January 19, 1999	Kitt Peak	Spacewatch	NYS	1.1 km	MPC · JPL
333896	1999 BE_{33}	—	January 22, 1999	Kitt Peak	Spacewatch	TEL	1.6 km	MPC · JPL
333897	1999 RF_{13}	—	September 7, 1999	Socorro	LINEAR	·	2.3 km	MPC · JPL
333898	1999 RN_{16}	—	September 7, 1999	Socorro	LINEAR	·	2.2 km	MPC · JPL
333899	1999 RQ_{21}	—	September 7, 1999	Socorro	LINEAR	·	2.6 km	MPC · JPL
333900	1999 RG_{70}	—	September 7, 1999	Socorro	LINEAR	JUN	1.0 km	MPC · JPL

== 333901–334000 ==
back to top

Designation			Discovery			Properties		Ref
Permanent	Provisional	Named after	Date	Site	Discoverer(s)	Category	Diam.	Ref
333901	1999 RX_{112}	—	September 9, 1999	Socorro	LINEAR	·	1.9 km	MPC · JPL
333902	1999 RX_{124}	—	September 13, 1999	Kitt Peak	Spacewatch	·	1.7 km	MPC · JPL
333903	1999 RE_{127}	—	September 9, 1999	Socorro	LINEAR	·	1.9 km	MPC · JPL
333904	1999 RR_{154}	—	September 9, 1999	Socorro	LINEAR	·	1.8 km	MPC · JPL
333905	1999 RS_{191}	—	September 11, 1999	Socorro	LINEAR	·	640 m	MPC · JPL
333906	1999 RP_{212}	—	September 8, 1999	Socorro	LINEAR	JUN	1.5 km	MPC · JPL
333907	1999 TV_{2}	—	October 2, 1999	Kitt Peak	Spacewatch	·	710 m	MPC · JPL
333908	1999 TN_{12}	—	October 10, 1999	Socorro	LINEAR	AMO +1km	950 m	MPC · JPL
333909	1999 TU_{21}	—	October 2, 1999	Kitt Peak	Spacewatch	EUN	1.5 km	MPC · JPL
333910	1999 TY_{43}	—	October 3, 1999	Kitt Peak	Spacewatch	·	1.4 km	MPC · JPL
333911	1999 TH_{59}	—	October 7, 1999	Kitt Peak	Spacewatch	·	1.7 km	MPC · JPL
333912	1999 TN_{65}	—	October 8, 1999	Kitt Peak	Spacewatch	·	1.6 km	MPC · JPL
333913	1999 TR_{83}	—	October 12, 1999	Kitt Peak	Spacewatch	·	1.5 km	MPC · JPL
333914	1999 TY_{107}	—	October 4, 1999	Socorro	LINEAR	EUN	1.8 km	MPC · JPL
333915	1999 TR_{115}	—	October 4, 1999	Socorro	LINEAR	·	2.5 km	MPC · JPL
333916	1999 TF_{117}	—	October 4, 1999	Socorro	LINEAR	·	670 m	MPC · JPL
333917	1999 TX_{117}	—	October 4, 1999	Socorro	LINEAR	·	1.8 km	MPC · JPL
333918	1999 TV_{134}	—	October 6, 1999	Socorro	LINEAR	·	2.2 km	MPC · JPL
333919	1999 TB_{157}	—	October 9, 1999	Socorro	LINEAR	·	1.8 km	MPC · JPL
333920	1999 TT_{158}	—	October 9, 1999	Socorro	LINEAR	·	2.5 km	MPC · JPL
333921	1999 TR_{159}	—	October 9, 1999	Socorro	LINEAR	·	2.4 km	MPC · JPL
333922	1999 TC_{176}	—	October 10, 1999	Socorro	LINEAR	·	1.9 km	MPC · JPL
333923	1999 TE_{250}	—	October 9, 1999	Catalina	CSS	·	2.1 km	MPC · JPL
333924	1999 TM_{263}	—	October 6, 1999	Socorro	LINEAR	EOS	1.9 km	MPC · JPL
333925	1999 TM_{265}	—	October 3, 1999	Socorro	LINEAR	JUN	1.3 km	MPC · JPL
333926	1999 TL_{297}	—	October 2, 1999	Kitt Peak	Spacewatch	·	1.5 km	MPC · JPL
333927	1999 TK_{315}	—	October 9, 1999	Socorro	LINEAR	·	2.1 km	MPC · JPL
333928	1999 TP_{333}	—	October 13, 1999	Apache Point	SDSS	·	2.4 km	MPC · JPL
333929	1999 UP_{2}	—	October 16, 1999	Siding Spring	R. H. McNaught	·	3.0 km	MPC · JPL
333930	1999 US_{5}	—	October 29, 1999	Catalina	CSS	·	2.9 km	MPC · JPL
333931	1999 UM_{23}	—	October 28, 1999	Catalina	CSS	·	3.0 km	MPC · JPL
333932	1999 UE_{32}	—	October 31, 1999	Kitt Peak	Spacewatch	(29841)	1.6 km	MPC · JPL
333933	1999 VF_{18}	—	November 2, 1999	Kitt Peak	Spacewatch	·	2.4 km	MPC · JPL
333934	1999 VG_{27}	—	November 3, 1999	Kitt Peak	Spacewatch	PAD	2.9 km	MPC · JPL
333935	1999 VK_{63}	—	November 4, 1999	Socorro	LINEAR	·	2.3 km	MPC · JPL
333936	1999 VC_{82}	—	November 5, 1999	Socorro	LINEAR	·	2.1 km	MPC · JPL
333937	1999 VH_{103}	—	November 9, 1999	Socorro	LINEAR	·	1.7 km	MPC · JPL
333938	1999 VR_{119}	—	November 3, 1999	Kitt Peak	Spacewatch	·	2.0 km	MPC · JPL
333939	1999 VZ_{120}	—	November 4, 1999	Kitt Peak	Spacewatch	·	2.1 km	MPC · JPL
333940	1999 VG_{124}	—	November 6, 1999	Kitt Peak	Spacewatch	·	2.0 km	MPC · JPL
333941	1999 VJ_{136}	—	November 9, 1999	Socorro	LINEAR	·	2.1 km	MPC · JPL
333942	1999 VK_{143}	—	November 14, 1999	Socorro	LINEAR	·	2.4 km	MPC · JPL
333943	1999 VO_{164}	—	November 14, 1999	Socorro	LINEAR	·	2.2 km	MPC · JPL
333944	1999 VK_{180}	—	November 6, 1999	Socorro	LINEAR	·	2.3 km	MPC · JPL
333945	1999 VU_{196}	—	November 1, 1999	Catalina	CSS	·	2.5 km	MPC · JPL
333946	1999 VT_{209}	—	November 12, 1999	Socorro	LINEAR	·	2.0 km	MPC · JPL
333947	1999 XA_{31}	—	December 6, 1999	Socorro	LINEAR	·	1.1 km	MPC · JPL
333948	1999 XG_{135}	—	December 6, 1999	Socorro	LINEAR	·	1.8 km	MPC · JPL
333949	1999 XM_{149}	—	December 8, 1999	Kitt Peak	Spacewatch	EOS	2.5 km	MPC · JPL
333950	1999 XJ_{251}	—	December 9, 1999	Kitt Peak	Spacewatch	·	1.2 km	MPC · JPL
333951	2000 AH_{57}	—	January 4, 2000	Socorro	LINEAR	·	4.3 km	MPC · JPL
333952	2000 AP_{215}	—	January 7, 2000	Kitt Peak	Spacewatch	·	3.4 km	MPC · JPL
333953	2000 AF_{221}	—	January 8, 2000	Kitt Peak	Spacewatch	HOF	3.4 km	MPC · JPL
333954	2000 AN_{221}	—	January 8, 2000	Kitt Peak	Spacewatch	·	820 m	MPC · JPL
333955	2000 AL_{231}	—	January 4, 2000	Socorro	LINEAR	·	2.5 km	MPC · JPL
333956	2000 BW_{11}	—	January 26, 2000	Kitt Peak	Spacewatch	GEF	1.3 km	MPC · JPL
333957	2000 CU_{71}	—	February 1, 2000	Kitt Peak	Spacewatch	BRA	1.6 km	MPC · JPL
333958	2000 CQ_{99}	—	February 8, 2000	Kitt Peak	Spacewatch	·	2.0 km	MPC · JPL
333959	2000 CW_{136}	—	February 3, 2000	Kitt Peak	Spacewatch	·	1.1 km	MPC · JPL
333960	2000 CJ_{142}	—	February 4, 2000	Kitt Peak	Spacewatch	·	580 m	MPC · JPL
333961	2000 EV_{14}	—	March 3, 2000	Socorro	LINEAR	·	3.5 km	MPC · JPL
333962	2000 EL_{27}	—	March 3, 2000	Socorro	LINEAR	·	1.6 km	MPC · JPL
333963	2000 EZ_{35}	—	March 3, 2000	Socorro	LINEAR	·	1.7 km	MPC · JPL
333964	2000 EP_{86}	—	March 8, 2000	Socorro	LINEAR	·	1.6 km	MPC · JPL
333965	2000 FW_{9}	—	March 30, 2000	Kitt Peak	Spacewatch	·	1.1 km	MPC · JPL
333966	2000 FF_{15}	—	March 29, 2000	Socorro	LINEAR	T_{j} (2.94)	4.0 km	MPC · JPL
333967	2000 FO_{48}	—	March 29, 2000	Socorro	LINEAR	·	1.5 km	MPC · JPL
333968	2000 GW_{26}	—	April 5, 2000	Socorro	LINEAR	·	3.5 km	MPC · JPL
333969	2000 GL_{122}	—	April 8, 2000	Kitt Peak	Spacewatch	H	680 m	MPC · JPL
333970	2000 GE_{130}	—	April 5, 2000	Kitt Peak	Spacewatch	·	2.0 km	MPC · JPL
333971	2000 HZ	—	April 24, 2000	Kitt Peak	Spacewatch	EOS	2.3 km	MPC · JPL
333972	2000 HY_{36}	—	April 28, 2000	Socorro	LINEAR	PHO	1.3 km	MPC · JPL
333973	2000 JY_{92}	—	May 4, 2000	Apache Point	SDSS	·	4.5 km	MPC · JPL
333974	2000 KA_{5}	—	May 27, 2000	Socorro	LINEAR	PHO	1.1 km	MPC · JPL
333975	2000 LK_{7}	—	June 6, 2000	Kitt Peak	Spacewatch	·	1.3 km	MPC · JPL
333976	2000 QA_{7}	—	August 24, 2000	Socorro	LINEAR	·	1.1 km	MPC · JPL
333977	2000 QM_{170}	—	August 31, 2000	Socorro	LINEAR	·	1.2 km	MPC · JPL
333978	2000 QS_{170}	—	August 31, 2000	Socorro	LINEAR	·	1.5 km	MPC · JPL
333979	2000 QZ_{195}	—	August 28, 2000	Socorro	LINEAR	RAF	1.4 km	MPC · JPL
333980	2000 RL_{12}	—	September 1, 2000	Socorro	LINEAR	·	2.3 km	MPC · JPL
333981	2000 RF_{88}	—	September 3, 2000	Socorro	LINEAR	·	1.2 km	MPC · JPL
333982	2000 SU_{9}	—	September 23, 2000	Socorro	LINEAR	·	1.6 km	MPC · JPL
333983	2000 SW_{13}	—	September 22, 2000	Socorro	LINEAR	·	2.0 km	MPC · JPL
333984	2000 SX_{27}	—	September 23, 2000	Socorro	LINEAR	·	2.1 km	MPC · JPL
333985	2000 SR_{42}	—	September 25, 2000	Haleakala	NEAT	·	1.8 km	MPC · JPL
333986	2000 SF_{66}	—	September 24, 2000	Socorro	LINEAR	·	1.1 km	MPC · JPL
333987	2000 SP_{174}	—	September 28, 2000	Socorro	LINEAR	·	1.4 km	MPC · JPL
333988	2000 SC_{180}	—	September 28, 2000	Socorro	LINEAR	·	2.7 km	MPC · JPL
333989	2000 SJ_{194}	—	September 24, 2000	Socorro	LINEAR	NYS	1.3 km	MPC · JPL
333990	2000 SF_{225}	—	September 27, 2000	Socorro	LINEAR	MAR	1.1 km	MPC · JPL
333991	2000 SQ_{251}	—	September 24, 2000	Socorro	LINEAR	·	1.0 km	MPC · JPL
333992	2000 SN_{262}	—	September 25, 2000	Socorro	LINEAR	·	910 m	MPC · JPL
333993	2000 SU_{264}	—	September 26, 2000	Socorro	LINEAR	·	2.1 km	MPC · JPL
333994	2000 SR_{295}	—	September 27, 2000	Socorro	LINEAR	·	2.0 km	MPC · JPL
333995	2000 SB_{313}	—	September 27, 2000	Socorro	LINEAR	·	1.8 km	MPC · JPL
333996	2000 SO_{347}	—	September 22, 2000	Socorro	LINEAR	·	2.5 km	MPC · JPL
333997	2000 SU_{351}	—	September 29, 2000	Anderson Mesa	LONEOS	·	1.5 km	MPC · JPL
333998	2000 SN_{362}	—	September 19, 2000	Anderson Mesa	LONEOS	·	1.7 km	MPC · JPL
333999	2000 TJ_{9}	—	October 1, 2000	Socorro	LINEAR	V	890 m	MPC · JPL
334000	2000 TK_{30}	—	October 2, 2000	Kitt Peak	Spacewatch	·	3.6 km	MPC · JPL

back to top

== See also ==
- Meanings of minor-planet names: 333001–334000
