= Gerhard Drolshagen =

German physicist

- Born: 1 July 1953 (age 73); Fürstenberg (Westfalen), Germany
- Education: University of Göttingen
- Known for: Space Environment and Near-Earth Objects and for the Asteroid named after him: Asteroid 332733 Drolshagen.
- Scientific career
- Fields: Physics, Space Environment, Near-Earth Objects
- Workplaces: University of Oldenburg
- Doctoral advisor: Jan Peter Toennies (Goettingen)

Gerhard Drolshagen (born July 1953) is a German physicist at the University of Oldenburg, Germany, specializing in space environment and near-Earth objects (NEO). He has been a staff member at the European Space Agency (ESA), European Space Research and Technology Centre (ESTEC), Noordwijk, The Netherlands (1987–2016) and is known for his work in space environment, NEO and for the asteroid named after him: the asteroid 332733 Drolshagen.

== Education and career ==
Drolshagen, after finishing his Abitur at the Gymnasium in Büren, Westphalia, Germany (1972), went on to study physics (1973–1978) at the University of Giessen and University of Göttingen, where he obtained his Diplom in Physics at the University of Göttingen in 1978. He pursued research at the Max-Planck Institute (MPI) für Strömungsforschung in Göttingen (1978–1981) and obtained his Doctorate Degree in Physics at the University of Göttingen in 1981. He was a postdoc at the Los Alamos National Laboratory, Los Alamos, US (1982–1984) and a scientific assistant at the MPI für Strömungsforschung in Göttingen (1984–1987). He then joined the European Space Agency (ESA) (1987–2016), where he worked in the Space Environments & Effects Section at ESA's establishment ESTEC in the Netherlands. Throughout his career at ESA he worked at ESTEC addressing all aspects of the space environment. At the end of November 2016 he reached his normal retirement age from ESA. He is currently (since 2017) affiliated to the Carl von Ossietzky University of Oldenburg and he also continues to be a consultant to ESA (since 2017).

== Research ==
At European Space Agency, Drolshagen worked extensively as a senior analyst in the Space Environments & Effects Section at ESTEC. He has been involved in many aspects of the space environment, like the analysis of surface and internal charging effects, ionizing radiation, and atomic oxygen in the upper atmosphere. His work focusses on the study of meteoroids and space debris fluxes and their effects on orbiting spacecraft including the assessment of the impact risk to spacecraft, analysis of impact data from retrieved hardware and in-situ detectors, development of new flux models and analysis tools and the development of new impact detectors.

During 2009–2016, he was the co-manager of the near-Earth objects (NEO) segment of ESA's Space Situational Awareness (SSA) Program. This SSA-NEO program addresses all NEO related aspects from observations, orbit calculation and predictions of potential impacts with Earth to the assessment of NEO mitigation options. Since its creation in 2014, he was the chair of the Space Mission Planning Advisory Group (SMPAG) which was initiated by the United Nations which assesses the options to prevent the impact of a threatening object from space. Since 2017 he is supporting the new group on Space Environment Studies at the Carl von Ossietzky University of Oldenburg. At ESA, Drolshagen worked extensively as a senior analyst in the Space Environments & Effects Section at ESTEC. He has been involved in many aspects of the space environment, like the analysis of surface and internal charging effects, ionizing radiation, and atomic oxygen in the upper atmosphere. His main work focusses on the study of meteoroids and space debris fluxes and their effects on orbiting spacecraft including the assessment of the impact risk to spacecraft, analysis of impact data from retrieved hardware and in-situ detectors, development of new flux models and analysis tools and the development of new impact detectors.

During 2009–2016, he has been the co-manager of the near-Earth objects segment of ESA's Space Situational Awareness Program. This SSA-NEO program addresses all NEO related aspects from observations, orbit calculation and predictions of potential impacts with Earth to the assessment of NEO mitigation options. Since its creation in 2014, he was the chair of the Space Mission Planning Advisory Group (SMPAG) which was initiated by the United Nations which assesses the options to prevent the impact of a threatening object from space. Since 2017 he is supporting the new group on Space Environment Studies at the Carl von Ossietzky University of Oldenburg by supervising students and giving a lecture course on the space environment. He is also a consultant to ESA in the NEO field. In January 2015 the International Astronomical Union honored him as a driving force of the European NEO Program and named the asteroid 332733 Drolshagen after him. He is currently affiliated to the University of Oldenburg by supervising students and giving a lecture course on the space environment. He is also a consultant to ESA in the NEO field.

He has written several scientific articles which have been widely quoted.

== See also ==
- (332733) Drolshagen
- Meanings of minor planet names: 332001–333000
