= Meanings of minor-planet names: 332001–333000 =

As minor planet discoveries are confirmed, they are given a permanent number by the IAU's Minor Planet Center (MPC), and the discoverers can then submit names for them, following the IAU's naming conventions. The list below concerns those minor planets in the specified number-range that have received names, and explains the meanings of those names.

Official naming citations of newly named small Solar System bodies are approved and published in a bulletin by IAU's Working Group for Small Bodies Nomenclature (WGSBN). Before May 2021, citations were published in MPC's Minor Planet Circulars for many decades. Recent citations can also be found on the JPL Small-Body Database (SBDB). Until his death in 2016, German astronomer Lutz D. Schmadel compiled these citations into the Dictionary of Minor Planet Names (DMP) and regularly updated the collection.

Based on Paul Herget's The Names of the Minor Planets, Schmadel also researched the unclear origin of numerous asteroids, most of which had been named prior to World War II. This article incorporates text from this source, which is in the public domain: SBDB New namings may only be added to this list below after official publication as the preannouncement of names is condemned. The WGSBN publishes a comprehensive guideline for the naming rules of non-cometary small Solar System bodies.

== 332001–332100 ==
Named minor planet	Provisional	This minor planet was named for...	Ref · Catalog
332084 Vasyakulbeda	2005 UQ_{12}	Vasyl' Kulbeda (born 1954), an engineer at the Department for Solar Physics of the Main Astronomical Observatory of the Ukrainian National Academy of Sciences.	JPL · 332084

== 332101–332200 ==
back to top

Named minor planet	Provisional	This minor planet was named for...	Ref · Catalog
332183 Jaroussky	2006 BE_{186}	Philippe Jaroussky (born 1978), a French countertenor	JPL · 332183

== 332201–332300 ==
back to top

Named minor planet	Provisional	This minor planet was named for...	Ref · Catalog
There are no named minor planets in this number range

== 332301–332400 ==
back to top

Named minor planet	Provisional	This minor planet was named for...	Ref · Catalog
332324 Bobmcdonald	2006 XN_{67}	Bob McDonald (born 1951), a distinguished award-winning science journalist and educator.	JPL · 332324
332326 Aresi	2006 YK_{19}	Paolo Aresi (born 1958), an Italian journalist and science fiction writer.	JPL · 332326

== 332401–332500 ==
back to top

Named minor planet	Provisional	This minor planet was named for...	Ref · Catalog
There are no named minor planets in this number range

== 332501–332600 ==
back to top

Named minor planet	Provisional	This minor planet was named for...	Ref · Catalog
332530 Canders	2008 OS_{18}	Fridrihs Canders or Friedrich Zander (1887–1933), a Baltic-German pioneer of rocketry and spaceflight in Russia	JPL · 332530

== 332601–332700 ==
back to top

Named minor planet	Provisional	This minor planet was named for...	Ref · Catalog
332632 Pharos	2008 UO_{1}	The Pharos of Alexandria was considered one of the seven wonders of the ancient world. This lighthouse, one of the tallest structures in the world at the time, was built on the island of Pharos, in front of the port of Alexandria of Egypt, and was destroyed by two earthquakes.	IAU · 332632

== 332701–332800 ==
back to top

Named minor planet	Provisional	This minor planet was named for...	Ref · Catalog
332706 Karlheidlas	2009 RW_{57}	Karl Heidlas (born 1932), a German chemist and amateur astronomer.	JPL · 332706
332733 Drolshagen	2009 SV_{321}	Gerhard Drolshagen (born 1953), the co-manager of the Near-Earth Object program of the European Space Agency.	JPL · 332733

== 332801–332900 ==
back to top

Named minor planet	Provisional	This minor planet was named for...	Ref · Catalog
332884 Arianagrande	2011 AG_{53}	Ariana Grande (born 1993), American singer-songwriter and actress	IAU · 332884

== 332901–333000 ==
back to top

Named minor planet	Provisional	This minor planet was named for...	Ref · Catalog
332991 Tammybecker	2011 FX_{147}	Tammy Becker (b. 1964), an American cartographer.	IAU · 332991

back to top

Preceded by 331,001–332,000	Meanings of minor-planet names List of minor planets: 332,001–333,000	Succeeded by 333,001–334,000
