= List of minor planets: 332001–333000 =

The following is a partial list of minor planets, running from minor-planet number 332001 through 333000, inclusive. The primary data for this and other partial lists is based on JPL's "Small-Body Orbital Elements" and data available from the Minor Planet Center. Critical list information is also provided by the MPC, unless otherwise specified from Lowell Observatory. A detailed description of the table's columns and additional sources are given on the main page including a complete list of every page in this series, and a statistical break-up on the dynamical classification of minor planets.

Also see the summary list of all named bodies in numerical and alphabetical order, and the corresponding naming citations for the number range of this particular list. New namings may only be added to this list after official publication, as the preannouncement of names is condemned by the Working Group for Small Bodies Nomenclature of the International Astronomical Union.

Near-Earth obj.	MBA (inner)	MBA (outer)	Centaur
Mars-crosser	MBA (middle)	Jupiter trojan	Trans-Neptunian obj.
Unclassified

== 332001–332100 ==
Designation			Discovery			Properties		Ref
Permanent	Provisional	Named after	Date	Site	Discoverer(s)	Category	Diam.	Ref
332001	2005 JN_{156}	—	May 4, 2005	Mount Lemmon	Mount Lemmon Survey	·	770 m	MPC · JPL
332002	2005 LJ_{4}	—	June 1, 2005	Kitt Peak	Spacewatch	MAR	1.0 km	MPC · JPL
332003	2005 LS_{13}	—	June 4, 2005	Kitt Peak	Spacewatch	·	670 m	MPC · JPL
332004	2005 LL_{16}	—	June 5, 2005	Kitt Peak	Spacewatch	·	1.3 km	MPC · JPL
332005	2005 LG_{18}	—	June 6, 2005	Kitt Peak	Spacewatch	·	790 m	MPC · JPL
332006	2005 LG_{39}	—	June 11, 2005	Kitt Peak	Spacewatch	PHO	1.1 km	MPC · JPL
332007	2005 MD_{14}	—	June 28, 2005	Palomar	NEAT	·	5.2 km	MPC · JPL
332008	2005 MR_{15}	—	June 30, 2005	Socorro	LINEAR	PHO	2.5 km	MPC · JPL
332009	2005 MN_{25}	—	June 27, 2005	Kitt Peak	Spacewatch	·	830 m	MPC · JPL
332010	2005 MT_{42}	—	June 29, 2005	Palomar	NEAT	3:2	6.8 km	MPC · JPL
332011	2005 ML_{52}	—	June 30, 2005	Kitt Peak	Spacewatch	·	1.1 km	MPC · JPL
332012	2005 NO_{7}	—	July 3, 2005	Mount Lemmon	Mount Lemmon Survey	MAS	930 m	MPC · JPL
332013	2005 NN_{11}	—	July 3, 2005	Mount Lemmon	Mount Lemmon Survey	MAS	660 m	MPC · JPL
332014	2005 NT_{47}	—	July 7, 2005	Kitt Peak	Spacewatch	3:2 · SHU	5.1 km	MPC · JPL
332015	2005 NY_{54}	—	July 10, 2005	Kitt Peak	Spacewatch	·	1.3 km	MPC · JPL
332016	2005 NL_{84}	—	July 2, 2005	Kitt Peak	Spacewatch	NYS	1.4 km	MPC · JPL
332017	2005 NF_{86}	—	July 3, 2005	Mount Lemmon	Mount Lemmon Survey	MAS	590 m	MPC · JPL
332018	2005 NH_{95}	—	July 6, 2005	Campo Imperatore	CINEOS	MAS	760 m	MPC · JPL
332019	2005 NP_{122}	—	July 3, 2005	Catalina	CSS	T_{j} (2.96) · HIL · 3:2 · slow	7.1 km	MPC · JPL
332020	2005 NR_{124}	—	July 8, 2005	Kitt Peak	Spacewatch	·	1.6 km	MPC · JPL
332021	2005 OA_{3}	—	July 30, 2005	Socorro	LINEAR	PHO · slow	3.1 km	MPC · JPL
332022	2005 OZ_{4}	—	June 13, 2005	Mount Lemmon	Mount Lemmon Survey	·	1.1 km	MPC · JPL
332023	2005 OF_{8}	—	July 31, 2005	Socorro	LINEAR	PHO	2.1 km	MPC · JPL
332024	2005 OO_{24}	—	July 30, 2005	Campo Imperatore	CINEOS	·	1.3 km	MPC · JPL
332025	2005 OX_{27}	—	July 29, 2005	Anderson Mesa	LONEOS	·	1.1 km	MPC · JPL
332026	2005 PH	—	August 2, 2005	Kingsnake	J. V. McClusky	·	1.6 km	MPC · JPL
332027	2005 PE_{3}	—	August 2, 2005	Socorro	LINEAR	·	1.1 km	MPC · JPL
332028	2005 PY_{4}	—	August 5, 2005	Needville	J. Dellinger	MAS	680 m	MPC · JPL
332029	2005 PQ_{10}	—	August 4, 2005	Palomar	NEAT	·	1.2 km	MPC · JPL
332030	2005 PK_{15}	—	August 4, 2005	Palomar	NEAT	MAS	860 m	MPC · JPL
332031	2005 PD_{16}	—	August 4, 2005	Palomar	NEAT	T_{j} (2.98) · 3:2	5.8 km	MPC · JPL
332032	2005 PW_{18}	—	August 9, 2005	Marly	P. Kocher	·	940 m	MPC · JPL
332033	2005 PL_{23}	—	August 13, 2005	Siding Spring	SSS	·	1.6 km	MPC · JPL
332034	2005 QS_{5}	—	July 28, 2005	Palomar	NEAT	V	580 m	MPC · JPL
332035	2005 QZ_{17}	—	August 25, 2005	Palomar	NEAT	·	1.3 km	MPC · JPL
332036	2005 QD_{53}	—	August 28, 2005	Kitt Peak	Spacewatch	PHO	1.4 km	MPC · JPL
332037	2005 QJ_{62}	—	August 26, 2005	Palomar	NEAT	·	1.1 km	MPC · JPL
332038	2005 QZ_{73}	—	August 29, 2005	Anderson Mesa	LONEOS	·	3.4 km	MPC · JPL
332039	2005 QU_{76}	—	August 29, 2005	Anderson Mesa	LONEOS	ERI	2.2 km	MPC · JPL
332040	2005 QY_{80}	—	August 28, 2005	Haleakala	NEAT	·	1.4 km	MPC · JPL
332041	2005 QD_{83}	—	August 29, 2005	Anderson Mesa	LONEOS	·	1.1 km	MPC · JPL
332042	2005 QN_{89}	—	August 22, 2005	Palomar	NEAT	NYS	1.3 km	MPC · JPL
332043	2005 QC_{99}	—	August 27, 2005	Palomar	NEAT	EOS	2.3 km	MPC · JPL
332044	2005 QP_{99}	—	August 27, 2005	Palomar	NEAT	·	1.5 km	MPC · JPL
332045	2005 QC_{115}	—	August 27, 2005	Palomar	NEAT	NYS	970 m	MPC · JPL
332046	2005 QP_{121}	—	August 28, 2005	Kitt Peak	Spacewatch	·	2.0 km	MPC · JPL
332047	2005 QU_{147}	—	August 28, 2005	Siding Spring	SSS	·	1.6 km	MPC · JPL
332048	2005 QN_{157}	—	August 30, 2005	Palomar	NEAT	ERI	1.7 km	MPC · JPL
332049	2005 QC_{158}	—	August 26, 2005	Palomar	NEAT	·	2.0 km	MPC · JPL
332050	2005 QH_{175}	—	August 31, 2005	Anderson Mesa	LONEOS	·	950 m	MPC · JPL
332051	2005 QJ_{176}	—	August 31, 2005	Kitt Peak	Spacewatch	NYS	1.2 km	MPC · JPL
332052	2005 QG_{183}	—	August 31, 2005	Palomar	NEAT	·	1.3 km	MPC · JPL
332053	2005 RR_{7}	—	September 8, 2005	Socorro	LINEAR	·	1.2 km	MPC · JPL
332054	2005 RB_{25}	—	September 10, 2005	Anderson Mesa	LONEOS	·	2.0 km	MPC · JPL
332055	2005 RW_{33}	—	September 13, 2005	Anderson Mesa	LONEOS	PHO	1.6 km	MPC · JPL
332056	2005 RM_{44}	—	September 13, 2005	Socorro	LINEAR	·	1.6 km	MPC · JPL
332057	2005 SY_{2}	—	September 23, 2005	Catalina	CSS	NYS	1.2 km	MPC · JPL
332058	2005 SM_{12}	—	September 23, 2005	Catalina	CSS	·	2.4 km	MPC · JPL
332059	2005 SD_{19}	—	September 25, 2005	Kitt Peak	Spacewatch	PHO	1.6 km	MPC · JPL
332060	2005 SA_{27}	—	September 23, 2005	Kitt Peak	Spacewatch	EOS	2.3 km	MPC · JPL
332061	2005 SN_{55}	—	September 25, 2005	Kitt Peak	Spacewatch	·	1.1 km	MPC · JPL
332062	2005 SQ_{65}	—	September 26, 2005	Palomar	NEAT	·	1.9 km	MPC · JPL
332063	2005 SL_{70}	—	September 28, 2005	Palomar	NEAT	·	1.9 km	MPC · JPL
332064	2005 ST_{99}	—	September 25, 2005	Kitt Peak	Spacewatch	·	1.6 km	MPC · JPL
332065	2005 SM_{102}	—	September 25, 2005	Kitt Peak	Spacewatch	·	1.6 km	MPC · JPL
332066	2005 SP_{108}	—	September 26, 2005	Kitt Peak	Spacewatch	MAS	610 m	MPC · JPL
332067	2005 SG_{132}	—	September 29, 2005	Catalina	CSS	ADE	4.0 km	MPC · JPL
332068	2005 SX_{162}	—	September 27, 2005	Socorro	LINEAR	V	910 m	MPC · JPL
332069	2005 SX_{193}	—	September 29, 2005	Kitt Peak	Spacewatch	EUN	1.4 km	MPC · JPL
332070	2005 SB_{199}	—	September 30, 2005	Kitt Peak	Spacewatch	·	1.3 km	MPC · JPL
332071	2005 SD_{210}	—	September 30, 2005	Palomar	NEAT	·	1.0 km	MPC · JPL
332072	2005 SZ_{213}	—	September 30, 2005	Catalina	CSS	MAR	1.5 km	MPC · JPL
332073	2005 SU_{214}	—	September 30, 2005	Anderson Mesa	LONEOS	·	4.1 km	MPC · JPL
332074	2005 SO_{219}	—	September 30, 2005	Mount Lemmon	Mount Lemmon Survey	·	1.9 km	MPC · JPL
332075	2005 SW_{226}	—	September 30, 2005	Kitt Peak	Spacewatch	·	1.4 km	MPC · JPL
332076	2005 SS_{239}	—	September 30, 2005	Palomar	NEAT	·	2.0 km	MPC · JPL
332077	2005 SG_{256}	—	September 22, 2005	Palomar	NEAT	(6769)	1.4 km	MPC · JPL
332078	2005 TY_{26}	—	October 1, 2005	Mount Lemmon	Mount Lemmon Survey	(5)	1.2 km	MPC · JPL
332079	2005 TZ_{27}	—	October 1, 2005	Mount Lemmon	Mount Lemmon Survey	·	510 m	MPC · JPL
332080	2005 TV_{55}	—	October 6, 2005	Kitt Peak	Spacewatch	CLA	1.7 km	MPC · JPL
332081	2005 TA_{138}	—	October 7, 2005	Catalina	CSS	MAR	990 m	MPC · JPL
332082	2005 TH_{141}	—	October 8, 2005	Kitt Peak	Spacewatch	·	1.5 km	MPC · JPL
332083	2005 TX_{169}	—	October 10, 2005	Anderson Mesa	LONEOS	·	2.8 km	MPC · JPL
332084 Vasyakulbeda	2005 UQ_{12}	Vasyakulbeda	October 29, 2005	Andrushivka	Andrushivka	·	2.8 km	MPC · JPL
332085	2005 UQ_{43}	—	October 22, 2005	Kitt Peak	Spacewatch	·	2.3 km	MPC · JPL
332086	2005 UN_{57}	—	October 24, 2005	Anderson Mesa	LONEOS	·	970 m	MPC · JPL
332087	2005 UE_{71}	—	October 23, 2005	Catalina	CSS	·	2.8 km	MPC · JPL
332088	2005 UH_{79}	—	October 25, 2005	Catalina	CSS	KON	2.5 km	MPC · JPL
332089	2005 UP_{79}	—	October 25, 2005	Catalina	CSS	·	1.5 km	MPC · JPL
332090	2005 UU_{84}	—	October 22, 2005	Kitt Peak	Spacewatch	·	1.3 km	MPC · JPL
332091	2005 UR_{89}	—	October 22, 2005	Kitt Peak	Spacewatch	·	3.9 km	MPC · JPL
332092	2005 UO_{94}	—	October 22, 2005	Kitt Peak	Spacewatch	·	2.6 km	MPC · JPL
332093	2005 UP_{103}	—	October 22, 2005	Kitt Peak	Spacewatch	·	1.4 km	MPC · JPL
332094	2005 UR_{121}	—	October 24, 2005	Kitt Peak	Spacewatch	·	1.2 km	MPC · JPL
332095	2005 UO_{142}	—	October 25, 2005	Mount Lemmon	Mount Lemmon Survey	·	1.9 km	MPC · JPL
332096	2005 UQ_{149}	—	October 26, 2005	Kitt Peak	Spacewatch	·	1.8 km	MPC · JPL
332097	2005 UW_{155}	—	October 26, 2005	Anderson Mesa	LONEOS	·	1.7 km	MPC · JPL
332098	2005 UH_{158}	—	October 27, 2005	Kitt Peak	Spacewatch	·	1.9 km	MPC · JPL
332099	2005 UE_{174}	—	October 24, 2005	Kitt Peak	Spacewatch	·	2.9 km	MPC · JPL
332100	2005 UE_{182}	—	October 24, 2005	Kitt Peak	Spacewatch	(5)	1.3 km	MPC · JPL

== 332101–332200 ==
back to top

Designation			Discovery			Properties		Ref
Permanent	Provisional	Named after	Date	Site	Discoverer(s)	Category	Diam.	Ref
332101	2005 UZ_{201}	—	October 25, 2005	Kitt Peak	Spacewatch	·	3.9 km	MPC · JPL
332102	2005 UL_{212}	—	October 27, 2005	Kitt Peak	Spacewatch	·	1.1 km	MPC · JPL
332103	2005 UY_{219}	—	October 25, 2005	Kitt Peak	Spacewatch	·	2.4 km	MPC · JPL
332104	2005 UE_{220}	—	October 25, 2005	Kitt Peak	Spacewatch	·	1.7 km	MPC · JPL
332105	2005 UC_{234}	—	October 25, 2005	Kitt Peak	Spacewatch	·	1.4 km	MPC · JPL
332106	2005 US_{253}	—	October 27, 2005	Kitt Peak	Spacewatch	·	1.2 km	MPC · JPL
332107	2005 UC_{272}	—	October 28, 2005	Kitt Peak	Spacewatch	·	1.6 km	MPC · JPL
332108	2005 UK_{297}	—	October 26, 2005	Kitt Peak	Spacewatch	·	1.8 km	MPC · JPL
332109	2005 UZ_{297}	—	October 26, 2005	Kitt Peak	Spacewatch	·	1.8 km	MPC · JPL
332110	2005 UJ_{314}	—	October 28, 2005	Catalina	CSS	·	1.4 km	MPC · JPL
332111	2005 UG_{397}	—	October 28, 2005	Catalina	CSS	·	1.3 km	MPC · JPL
332112	2005 UV_{401}	—	October 27, 2005	Kitt Peak	Spacewatch	·	1.4 km	MPC · JPL
332113	2005 UE_{424}	—	October 28, 2005	Kitt Peak	Spacewatch	·	1.1 km	MPC · JPL
332114	2005 UK_{430}	—	October 28, 2005	Kitt Peak	Spacewatch	·	1.1 km	MPC · JPL
332115	2005 UN_{433}	—	October 28, 2005	Kitt Peak	Spacewatch	·	3.3 km	MPC · JPL
332116	2005 UW_{454}	—	October 28, 2005	Socorro	LINEAR	·	2.1 km	MPC · JPL
332117	2005 UR_{485}	—	October 22, 2005	Catalina	CSS	·	1.8 km	MPC · JPL
332118	2005 UF_{512}	—	October 29, 2005	Catalina	CSS	·	1.8 km	MPC · JPL
332119	2005 UE_{513}	—	October 29, 2005	Palomar	NEAT	·	1.5 km	MPC · JPL
332120	2005 VC_{6}	—	June 9, 1997	Kitt Peak	Spacewatch	·	4.3 km	MPC · JPL
332121	2005 VV_{10}	—	November 2, 2005	Mount Lemmon	Mount Lemmon Survey	(5)	1.3 km	MPC · JPL
332122	2005 VH_{34}	—	November 3, 2005	Mount Lemmon	Mount Lemmon Survey	·	2.3 km	MPC · JPL
332123	2005 VH_{66}	—	November 1, 2005	Mount Lemmon	Mount Lemmon Survey	·	1.2 km	MPC · JPL
332124	2005 VM_{83}	—	November 3, 2005	Mount Lemmon	Mount Lemmon Survey	·	4.0 km	MPC · JPL
332125	2005 WL_{16}	—	November 22, 2005	Kitt Peak	Spacewatch	·	1.5 km	MPC · JPL
332126	2005 WE_{19}	—	November 24, 2005	Palomar	NEAT	·	1.2 km	MPC · JPL
332127	2005 WO_{33}	—	November 21, 2005	Kitt Peak	Spacewatch	·	2.6 km	MPC · JPL
332128	2005 WJ_{37}	—	November 22, 2005	Kitt Peak	Spacewatch	·	3.3 km	MPC · JPL
332129	2005 WG_{54}	—	November 24, 2005	Palomar	NEAT	H	710 m	MPC · JPL
332130	2005 WH_{54}	—	October 30, 2005	Catalina	CSS	H	590 m	MPC · JPL
332131	2005 WD_{87}	—	November 28, 2005	Mount Lemmon	Mount Lemmon Survey	·	1.7 km	MPC · JPL
332132	2005 WT_{92}	—	November 25, 2005	Mount Lemmon	Mount Lemmon Survey	·	1.9 km	MPC · JPL
332133	2005 WS_{101}	—	November 29, 2005	Socorro	LINEAR	·	2.8 km	MPC · JPL
332134	2005 WU_{107}	—	November 26, 2005	Mount Lemmon	Mount Lemmon Survey	·	3.2 km	MPC · JPL
332135	2005 WD_{108}	—	November 28, 2005	Catalina	CSS	·	2.4 km	MPC · JPL
332136	2005 WT_{110}	—	November 30, 2005	Kitt Peak	Spacewatch	·	900 m	MPC · JPL
332137	2005 WU_{135}	—	November 26, 2005	Kitt Peak	Spacewatch	·	1.5 km	MPC · JPL
332138	2005 WN_{144}	—	November 24, 2005	Palomar	NEAT	·	2.3 km	MPC · JPL
332139	2005 WY_{157}	—	November 25, 2005	Palomar	NEAT	·	3.6 km	MPC · JPL
332140	2005 WM_{159}	—	September 30, 2005	Mount Lemmon	Mount Lemmon Survey	HOF	3.1 km	MPC · JPL
332141	2005 WQ_{170}	—	November 30, 2005	Kitt Peak	Spacewatch	·	2.4 km	MPC · JPL
332142	2005 WC_{177}	—	November 30, 2005	Kitt Peak	Spacewatch	·	2.6 km	MPC · JPL
332143	2005 XH_{7}	—	December 4, 2005	Socorro	LINEAR	HNS	1.4 km	MPC · JPL
332144	2005 XC_{42}	—	December 4, 2005	Kitt Peak	Spacewatch	·	1.4 km	MPC · JPL
332145	2005 XK_{50}	—	December 2, 2005	Kitt Peak	Spacewatch	·	1.8 km	MPC · JPL
332146	2005 XH_{61}	—	December 4, 2005	Kitt Peak	Spacewatch	·	1.4 km	MPC · JPL
332147	2005 XU_{70}	—	December 6, 2005	Kitt Peak	Spacewatch	·	1.6 km	MPC · JPL
332148	2005 XB_{115}	—	December 10, 2005	Socorro	LINEAR	·	2.0 km	MPC · JPL
332149	2005 YT_{41}	—	December 22, 2005	Kitt Peak	Spacewatch	·	2.1 km	MPC · JPL
332150	2005 YQ_{44}	—	December 25, 2005	Kitt Peak	Spacewatch	·	2.1 km	MPC · JPL
332151	2005 YY_{70}	—	December 22, 2005	Catalina	CSS	H	610 m	MPC · JPL
332152	2005 YG_{77}	—	November 16, 2000	Kitt Peak	Spacewatch	AGN	1.4 km	MPC · JPL
332153	2005 YL_{77}	—	December 24, 2005	Kitt Peak	Spacewatch	H	740 m	MPC · JPL
332154	2005 YV_{80}	—	December 24, 2005	Kitt Peak	Spacewatch	·	1.2 km	MPC · JPL
332155	2005 YZ_{108}	—	December 25, 2005	Kitt Peak	Spacewatch	·	1.6 km	MPC · JPL
332156	2005 YL_{109}	—	December 25, 2005	Kitt Peak	Spacewatch	·	2.2 km	MPC · JPL
332157	2005 YM_{135}	—	December 26, 2005	Kitt Peak	Spacewatch	·	2.7 km	MPC · JPL
332158	2005 YC_{152}	—	December 27, 2005	Mount Lemmon	Mount Lemmon Survey	·	1.6 km	MPC · JPL
332159	2005 YB_{170}	—	October 7, 2004	Kitt Peak	Spacewatch	·	2.2 km	MPC · JPL
332160	2005 YB_{172}	—	December 22, 2005	Catalina	CSS	BRA	1.9 km	MPC · JPL
332161	2005 YD_{175}	—	December 30, 2005	Socorro	LINEAR	·	2.3 km	MPC · JPL
332162	2005 YW_{178}	—	December 25, 2005	Mount Lemmon	Mount Lemmon Survey	·	2.7 km	MPC · JPL
332163	2005 YJ_{185}	—	December 27, 2005	Kitt Peak	Spacewatch	KOR	1.6 km	MPC · JPL
332164	2005 YP_{192}	—	December 30, 2005	Kitt Peak	Spacewatch	H	750 m	MPC · JPL
332165	2005 YE_{197}	—	December 1, 2005	Kitt Peak	Spacewatch	·	2.0 km	MPC · JPL
332166	2005 YS_{204}	—	December 25, 2005	Mount Lemmon	Mount Lemmon Survey	H	860 m	MPC · JPL
332167	2005 YT_{228}	—	December 25, 2005	Mount Lemmon	Mount Lemmon Survey	·	2.0 km	MPC · JPL
332168	2005 YH_{239}	—	December 29, 2005	Mount Lemmon	Mount Lemmon Survey	·	1.8 km	MPC · JPL
332169	2006 AX_{4}	—	January 2, 2006	Catalina	CSS	·	4.6 km	MPC · JPL
332170	2006 AO_{14}	—	January 5, 2006	Mount Lemmon	Mount Lemmon Survey	·	1.6 km	MPC · JPL
332171	2006 AD_{39}	—	January 7, 2006	Mount Lemmon	Mount Lemmon Survey	AGN	1.1 km	MPC · JPL
332172	2006 AE_{39}	—	January 7, 2006	Mount Lemmon	Mount Lemmon Survey	·	2.3 km	MPC · JPL
332173	2006 AB_{79}	—	January 6, 2006	Kitt Peak	Spacewatch	·	2.4 km	MPC · JPL
332174	2006 BH_{38}	—	January 23, 2006	Mount Lemmon	Mount Lemmon Survey	KOR	1.5 km	MPC · JPL
332175	2006 BP_{46}	—	January 23, 2006	Mount Lemmon	Mount Lemmon Survey	·	2.1 km	MPC · JPL
332176	2006 BG_{54}	—	January 7, 2006	Mount Lemmon	Mount Lemmon Survey	·	2.4 km	MPC · JPL
332177	2006 BU_{71}	—	October 2, 2000	Anderson Mesa	LONEOS	(5)	1.3 km	MPC · JPL
332178	2006 BV_{96}	—	January 26, 2006	Kitt Peak	Spacewatch	·	650 m	MPC · JPL
332179	2006 BH_{109}	—	January 25, 2006	Kitt Peak	Spacewatch	·	2.5 km	MPC · JPL
332180	2006 BK_{110}	—	January 25, 2006	Kitt Peak	Spacewatch	·	4.2 km	MPC · JPL
332181	2006 BM_{127}	—	January 26, 2006	Kitt Peak	Spacewatch	KOR	1.4 km	MPC · JPL
332182	2006 BG_{145}	—	January 23, 2006	Socorro	LINEAR	EUN	1.7 km	MPC · JPL
332183 Jaroussky	2006 BE_{186}	Jaroussky	January 28, 2006	Nogales	J.-C. Merlin	·	2.9 km	MPC · JPL
332184	2006 BC_{193}	—	January 30, 2006	Kitt Peak	Spacewatch	·	3.9 km	MPC · JPL
332185	2006 BV_{217}	—	January 23, 2006	Catalina	CSS	·	3.7 km	MPC · JPL
332186	2006 BX_{223}	—	January 23, 2006	Mount Lemmon	Mount Lemmon Survey	·	2.2 km	MPC · JPL
332187	2006 BM_{232}	—	January 31, 2006	Kitt Peak	Spacewatch	·	2.0 km	MPC · JPL
332188	2006 BL_{238}	—	January 31, 2006	Kitt Peak	Spacewatch	(5)	1.2 km	MPC · JPL
332189	2006 BN_{256}	—	January 31, 2006	Kitt Peak	Spacewatch	·	2.2 km	MPC · JPL
332190	2006 BR_{277}	—	January 27, 2006	Kitt Peak	Spacewatch	NEM · slow	2.9 km	MPC · JPL
332191	2006 CG_{38}	—	February 2, 2006	Kitt Peak	Spacewatch	·	2.3 km	MPC · JPL
332192	2006 CH_{44}	—	February 3, 2006	Kitt Peak	Spacewatch	·	1.8 km	MPC · JPL
332193	2006 DD_{34}	—	February 20, 2006	Kitt Peak	Spacewatch	·	2.8 km	MPC · JPL
332194	2006 DH_{50}	—	February 22, 2006	Catalina	CSS	HOF	4.1 km	MPC · JPL
332195	2006 DB_{58}	—	February 24, 2006	Mount Lemmon	Mount Lemmon Survey	NEM	2.5 km	MPC · JPL
332196	2006 DX_{78}	—	October 31, 2005	Mauna Kea	A. Boattini	·	2.1 km	MPC · JPL
332197	2006 DN_{79}	—	February 24, 2006	Kitt Peak	Spacewatch	·	3.0 km	MPC · JPL
332198	2006 DQ_{101}	—	February 25, 2006	Kitt Peak	Spacewatch	·	1.1 km	MPC · JPL
332199	2006 DV_{114}	—	November 9, 2004	Catalina	CSS	·	3.8 km	MPC · JPL
332200	2006 DL_{115}	—	December 2, 2005	Mauna Kea	A. Boattini	THM	1.9 km	MPC · JPL

== 332201–332300 ==
back to top

Designation			Discovery			Properties		Ref
Permanent	Provisional	Named after	Date	Site	Discoverer(s)	Category	Diam.	Ref
332201	2006 DZ_{154}	—	February 25, 2006	Kitt Peak	Spacewatch	·	4.6 km	MPC · JPL
332202	2006 DK_{187}	—	February 27, 2006	Kitt Peak	Spacewatch	·	2.2 km	MPC · JPL
332203	2006 DU_{196}	—	February 24, 2006	Catalina	CSS	·	3.6 km	MPC · JPL
332204	2006 EH_{15}	—	March 2, 2006	Kitt Peak	Spacewatch	·	2.6 km	MPC · JPL
332205	2006 EU_{16}	—	March 2, 2006	Mount Lemmon	Mount Lemmon Survey	·	2.5 km	MPC · JPL
332206	2006 EY_{33}	—	March 3, 2006	Kitt Peak	Spacewatch	·	2.3 km	MPC · JPL
332207	2006 EW_{57}	—	March 5, 2006	Kitt Peak	Spacewatch	EOS	1.7 km	MPC · JPL
332208	2006 EX_{69}	—	March 2, 2006	Catalina	CSS	EUP	4.2 km	MPC · JPL
332209	2006 FC_{9}	—	March 23, 2006	Kitt Peak	Spacewatch	·	3.7 km	MPC · JPL
332210	2006 FG_{12}	—	March 23, 2006	Catalina	CSS	·	2.7 km	MPC · JPL
332211	2006 FS_{18}	—	March 23, 2006	Mount Lemmon	Mount Lemmon Survey	·	3.3 km	MPC · JPL
332212	2006 FQ_{25}	—	March 24, 2006	Mount Lemmon	Mount Lemmon Survey	·	2.9 km	MPC · JPL
332213	2006 FY_{30}	—	December 3, 2005	Mauna Kea	A. Boattini	NYS	1.4 km	MPC · JPL
332214	2006 FQ_{50}	—	March 25, 2006	Kitt Peak	Spacewatch	·	4.5 km	MPC · JPL
332215	2006 GN_{3}	—	April 1, 2006	Eskridge	Farpoint	·	3.3 km	MPC · JPL
332216	2006 GC_{22}	—	April 2, 2006	Kitt Peak	Spacewatch	·	3.1 km	MPC · JPL
332217	2006 GV_{36}	—	March 23, 2006	Kitt Peak	Spacewatch	·	3.2 km	MPC · JPL
332218	2006 GC_{41}	—	April 7, 2006	Catalina	CSS	·	4.0 km	MPC · JPL
332219	2006 GJ_{44}	—	April 2, 2006	Kitt Peak	Spacewatch	·	7.6 km	MPC · JPL
332220	2006 GP_{48}	—	April 9, 2006	Kitt Peak	Spacewatch	·	3.8 km	MPC · JPL
332221	2006 GG_{50}	—	October 25, 2003	Kitt Peak	Spacewatch	·	3.8 km	MPC · JPL
332222	2006 GA_{53}	—	April 2, 2006	Anderson Mesa	LONEOS	·	4.7 km	MPC · JPL
332223	2006 GU_{54}	—	April 7, 2006	Kitt Peak	Spacewatch	THM	1.9 km	MPC · JPL
332224	2006 GZ_{54}	—	April 2, 2006	Kitt Peak	Spacewatch	·	2.1 km	MPC · JPL
332225	2006 HW_{32}	—	April 19, 2006	Mount Lemmon	Mount Lemmon Survey	·	3.0 km	MPC · JPL
332226	2006 HF_{41}	—	April 21, 2006	Kitt Peak	Spacewatch	·	3.4 km	MPC · JPL
332227	2006 HL_{42}	—	April 23, 2006	Socorro	LINEAR	EUP	6.2 km	MPC · JPL
332228	2006 HD_{46}	—	April 25, 2006	Kitt Peak	Spacewatch	(8737)	3.9 km	MPC · JPL
332229	2006 HA_{54}	—	March 25, 2006	Vail-Jarnac	Jarnac	·	3.3 km	MPC · JPL
332230	2006 HN_{55}	—	April 23, 2006	Socorro	LINEAR	·	3.6 km	MPC · JPL
332231	2006 HK_{76}	—	April 25, 2006	Kitt Peak	Spacewatch	T_{j} (2.9)	4.5 km	MPC · JPL
332232	2006 HY_{83}	—	April 26, 2006	Kitt Peak	Spacewatch	·	3.6 km	MPC · JPL
332233	2006 HJ_{96}	—	April 30, 2006	Kitt Peak	Spacewatch	·	2.3 km	MPC · JPL
332234	2006 HB_{116}	—	September 18, 2003	Kitt Peak	Spacewatch	·	990 m	MPC · JPL
332235	2006 HM_{153}	—	April 21, 2006	Kitt Peak	Spacewatch	·	3.4 km	MPC · JPL
332236	2006 JW_{21}	—	May 2, 2006	Kitt Peak	Spacewatch	VER	3.4 km	MPC · JPL
332237	2006 JV_{38}	—	May 6, 2006	Mount Lemmon	Mount Lemmon Survey	·	3.1 km	MPC · JPL
332238	2006 JH_{41}	—	August 22, 2003	Campo Imperatore	CINEOS	·	1.9 km	MPC · JPL
332239	2006 JD_{46}	—	May 10, 2006	Palomar	NEAT	·	3.5 km	MPC · JPL
332240	2006 KF_{3}	—	May 19, 2006	Mount Lemmon	Mount Lemmon Survey	TIR	3.4 km	MPC · JPL
332241	2006 KB_{12}	—	May 20, 2006	Kitt Peak	Spacewatch	·	4.3 km	MPC · JPL
332242	2006 KL_{13}	—	May 20, 2006	Kitt Peak	Spacewatch	·	5.5 km	MPC · JPL
332243	2006 KT_{27}	—	May 20, 2006	Kitt Peak	Spacewatch	THM	2.6 km	MPC · JPL
332244	2006 KC_{31}	—	May 20, 2006	Kitt Peak	Spacewatch	THM	2.6 km	MPC · JPL
332245	2006 KH_{31}	—	May 20, 2006	Kitt Peak	Spacewatch	·	4.1 km	MPC · JPL
332246	2006 KM_{46}	—	May 21, 2006	Mount Lemmon	Mount Lemmon Survey	·	6.1 km	MPC · JPL
332247	2006 KG_{49}	—	May 21, 2006	Kitt Peak	Spacewatch	·	4.6 km	MPC · JPL
332248	2006 KE_{54}	—	May 21, 2006	Kitt Peak	Spacewatch	·	3.7 km	MPC · JPL
332249	2006 KM_{85}	—	May 20, 2006	Catalina	CSS	·	5.7 km	MPC · JPL
332250	2006 KH_{90}	—	May 24, 2006	Kitt Peak	Spacewatch	URS	5.7 km	MPC · JPL
332251	2006 KZ_{101}	—	May 27, 2006	Kitt Peak	Spacewatch	·	3.1 km	MPC · JPL
332252	2006 KP_{103}	—	May 30, 2006	Reedy Creek	J. Broughton	·	6.0 km	MPC · JPL
332253	2006 KR_{123}	—	May 31, 2006	Mount Lemmon	Mount Lemmon Survey	·	1.0 km	MPC · JPL
332254	2006 MZ_{2}	—	June 18, 2006	Palomar	NEAT	·	4.6 km	MPC · JPL
332255	2006 MH_{6}	—	June 19, 2006	Mount Lemmon	Mount Lemmon Survey	T_{j} (2.97)	8.2 km	MPC · JPL
332256	2006 MU_{11}	—	June 19, 2006	Kitt Peak	Spacewatch	·	4.5 km	MPC · JPL
332257	2006 QO_{27}	—	August 20, 2006	Kitt Peak	Spacewatch	·	720 m	MPC · JPL
332258	2006 QJ_{34}	—	August 19, 2006	Kitt Peak	Spacewatch	·	540 m	MPC · JPL
332259	2006 QV_{76}	—	August 21, 2006	Kitt Peak	Spacewatch	·	720 m	MPC · JPL
332260	2006 QO_{100}	—	August 24, 2006	Socorro	LINEAR	·	1.1 km	MPC · JPL
332261	2006 RA_{36}	—	September 14, 2006	Palomar	NEAT	·	890 m	MPC · JPL
332262	2006 RN_{37}	—	September 12, 2006	Catalina	CSS	3:2 · SHU	5.5 km	MPC · JPL
332263	2006 RT_{62}	—	September 14, 2006	Catalina	CSS	·	710 m	MPC · JPL
332264	2006 RS_{77}	—	July 21, 2006	Mount Lemmon	Mount Lemmon Survey	·	780 m	MPC · JPL
332265	2006 RZ_{78}	—	September 15, 2006	Kitt Peak	Spacewatch	·	600 m	MPC · JPL
332266	2006 RW_{95}	—	September 15, 2006	Kitt Peak	Spacewatch	V	680 m	MPC · JPL
332267	2006 RO_{120}	—	September 14, 2006	Kitt Peak	Spacewatch	·	770 m	MPC · JPL
332268	2006 SO_{21}	—	September 17, 2006	Catalina	CSS	·	890 m	MPC · JPL
332269	2006 SD_{24}	—	September 18, 2006	Catalina	CSS	·	1.4 km	MPC · JPL
332270	2006 SP_{31}	—	September 17, 2006	Kitt Peak	Spacewatch	·	640 m	MPC · JPL
332271	2006 SQ_{40}	—	September 18, 2006	Catalina	CSS	·	690 m	MPC · JPL
332272	2006 SQ_{145}	—	September 19, 2006	Kitt Peak	Spacewatch	·	730 m	MPC · JPL
332273	2006 SN_{149}	—	September 19, 2006	Kitt Peak	Spacewatch	·	940 m	MPC · JPL
332274	2006 SG_{150}	—	September 19, 2006	Kitt Peak	Spacewatch	·	980 m	MPC · JPL
332275	2006 SZ_{181}	—	September 25, 2006	Anderson Mesa	LONEOS	HIL · 3:2	7.2 km	MPC · JPL
332276	2006 SD_{200}	—	September 24, 2006	Kitt Peak	Spacewatch	·	570 m	MPC · JPL
332277	2006 SS_{213}	—	September 27, 2006	Socorro	LINEAR	·	850 m	MPC · JPL
332278	2006 SW_{223}	—	September 25, 2006	Mount Lemmon	Mount Lemmon Survey	·	1.9 km	MPC · JPL
332279	2006 SA_{300}	—	September 19, 2006	Catalina	CSS	·	680 m	MPC · JPL
332280	2006 SF_{317}	—	September 27, 2006	Kitt Peak	Spacewatch	·	890 m	MPC · JPL
332281	2006 SL_{329}	—	September 27, 2006	Kitt Peak	Spacewatch	·	720 m	MPC · JPL
332282	2006 SX_{342}	—	September 28, 2006	Kitt Peak	Spacewatch	·	1.9 km	MPC · JPL
332283	2006 SX_{355}	—	September 30, 2006	Catalina	CSS	·	870 m	MPC · JPL
332284	2006 SD_{394}	—	September 30, 2006	Mount Lemmon	Mount Lemmon Survey	·	810 m	MPC · JPL
332285	2006 SL_{411}	—	September 19, 2006	Catalina	CSS	·	850 m	MPC · JPL
332286	2006 TT	—	October 1, 2006	Piszkéstető	K. Sárneczky	·	700 m	MPC · JPL
332287	2006 TR_{4}	—	October 2, 2006	Mount Lemmon	Mount Lemmon Survey	·	610 m	MPC · JPL
332288	2006 TE_{17}	—	October 11, 2006	Kitt Peak	Spacewatch	T_{j} (2.99) · 3:2 · SHU	7.9 km	MPC · JPL
332289	2006 TJ_{24}	—	September 25, 2006	Kitt Peak	Spacewatch	·	1.3 km	MPC · JPL
332290	2006 TK_{33}	—	October 12, 2006	Kitt Peak	Spacewatch	·	1.7 km	MPC · JPL
332291	2006 TS_{84}	—	October 13, 2006	Kitt Peak	Spacewatch	·	1.3 km	MPC · JPL
332292	2006 TE_{110}	—	October 13, 2006	Kitt Peak	Spacewatch	·	1.1 km	MPC · JPL
332293	2006 TF_{130}	—	October 12, 2006	Palomar	NEAT	·	920 m	MPC · JPL
332294	2006 UG_{15}	—	October 17, 2006	Mount Lemmon	Mount Lemmon Survey	T_{j} (2.97) · HIL · 3:2	5.4 km	MPC · JPL
332295	2006 UG_{24}	—	October 16, 2006	Kitt Peak	Spacewatch	·	1.3 km	MPC · JPL
332296	2006 UK_{92}	—	September 30, 2006	Mount Lemmon	Mount Lemmon Survey	3:2 · SHU	6.0 km	MPC · JPL
332297	2006 UK_{95}	—	October 18, 2006	Kitt Peak	Spacewatch	·	1.6 km	MPC · JPL
332298	2006 UP_{165}	—	October 21, 2006	Mount Lemmon	Mount Lemmon Survey	V	610 m	MPC · JPL
332299	2006 UG_{186}	—	September 17, 2006	Catalina	CSS	·	990 m	MPC · JPL
332300	2006 UO_{217}	—	October 31, 2006	Catalina	CSS	BAR	2.4 km	MPC · JPL

== 332301–332400 ==
back to top

Designation			Discovery			Properties		Ref
Permanent	Provisional	Named after	Date	Site	Discoverer(s)	Category	Diam.	Ref
332301	2006 UW_{242}	—	October 27, 2006	Kitt Peak	Spacewatch	·	650 m	MPC · JPL
332302	2006 UR_{291}	—	October 27, 2006	Mount Lemmon	Mount Lemmon Survey	·	2.0 km	MPC · JPL
332303	2006 UN_{359}	—	October 21, 2006	Kitt Peak	Spacewatch	·	660 m	MPC · JPL
332304	2006 UR_{360}	—	October 16, 2006	Catalina	CSS	·	850 m	MPC · JPL
332305	2006 VN_{21}	—	November 10, 2006	Kitt Peak	Spacewatch	·	1.1 km	MPC · JPL
332306	2006 VH_{65}	—	November 11, 2006	Kitt Peak	Spacewatch	·	710 m	MPC · JPL
332307	2006 VH_{67}	—	November 11, 2006	Kitt Peak	Spacewatch	·	790 m	MPC · JPL
332308	2006 VT_{75}	—	November 11, 2006	Kitt Peak	Spacewatch	·	910 m	MPC · JPL
332309	2006 VB_{101}	—	November 11, 2006	Catalina	CSS	·	810 m	MPC · JPL
332310	2006 VL_{123}	—	November 14, 2006	Kitt Peak	Spacewatch	V	830 m	MPC · JPL
332311	2006 VZ_{153}	—	November 8, 2006	Palomar	NEAT	·	1.3 km	MPC · JPL
332312	2006 WM_{2}	—	November 18, 2006	Socorro	LINEAR	·	1.0 km	MPC · JPL
332313	2006 WV_{5}	—	November 16, 2006	Kitt Peak	Spacewatch	·	1.4 km	MPC · JPL
332314	2006 WT_{6}	—	November 16, 2006	Kitt Peak	Spacewatch	·	1.5 km	MPC · JPL
332315	2006 WS_{13}	—	November 16, 2006	Mount Lemmon	Mount Lemmon Survey	·	640 m	MPC · JPL
332316	2006 WE_{15}	—	November 16, 2006	Catalina	CSS	BAR	2.2 km	MPC · JPL
332317	2006 WH_{40}	—	November 16, 2006	Kitt Peak	Spacewatch	·	760 m	MPC · JPL
332318	2006 WU_{62}	—	November 17, 2006	Mount Lemmon	Mount Lemmon Survey	·	1.3 km	MPC · JPL
332319	2006 WO_{64}	—	November 17, 2006	Mount Lemmon	Mount Lemmon Survey	V	750 m	MPC · JPL
332320	2006 WA_{87}	—	November 18, 2006	Socorro	LINEAR	PHO	1.1 km	MPC · JPL
332321	2006 WZ_{92}	—	November 19, 2006	Kitt Peak	Spacewatch	V	720 m	MPC · JPL
332322	2006 WS_{120}	—	December 18, 2001	Socorro	LINEAR	·	2.5 km	MPC · JPL
332323	2006 XF_{27}	—	December 12, 2006	Kitt Peak	Spacewatch	·	1.7 km	MPC · JPL
332324 Bobmcdonald	2006 XN_{67}	Bobmcdonald	December 12, 2006	Mauna Kea	D. D. Balam	PHO	910 m	MPC · JPL
332325	2006 XA_{69}	—	December 12, 2006	Mount Lemmon	Mount Lemmon Survey	·	730 m	MPC · JPL
332326 Aresi	2006 YK_{19}	Aresi	December 27, 2006	Gnosca	S. Sposetti	·	1.7 km	MPC · JPL
332327	2006 YD_{24}	—	December 21, 2006	Kitt Peak	Spacewatch	·	700 m	MPC · JPL
332328	2006 YK_{46}	—	December 21, 2006	Mount Lemmon	Mount Lemmon Survey	·	1.3 km	MPC · JPL
332329	2006 YV_{53}	—	December 27, 2006	Mount Lemmon	Mount Lemmon Survey	·	1.9 km	MPC · JPL
332330	2007 AC_{21}	—	January 10, 2007	Mount Lemmon	Mount Lemmon Survey	PHO	1.2 km	MPC · JPL
332331	2007 BL_{1}	—	January 16, 2007	Catalina	CSS	·	1.5 km	MPC · JPL
332332	2007 BM_{37}	—	January 24, 2007	Mount Lemmon	Mount Lemmon Survey	·	1.5 km	MPC · JPL
332333	2007 BE_{39}	—	January 24, 2007	Catalina	CSS	MIS	3.0 km	MPC · JPL
332334	2007 BY_{41}	—	January 24, 2007	Catalina	CSS	·	1.4 km	MPC · JPL
332335	2007 BP_{46}	—	January 26, 2007	Kitt Peak	Spacewatch	·	1.2 km	MPC · JPL
332336	2007 BK_{56}	—	November 24, 2006	Mount Lemmon	Mount Lemmon Survey	(5)	1.3 km	MPC · JPL
332337	2007 BS_{57}	—	December 21, 2006	Mount Lemmon	Mount Lemmon Survey	·	1.7 km	MPC · JPL
332338	2007 BU_{68}	—	January 27, 2007	Mount Lemmon	Mount Lemmon Survey	·	1.7 km	MPC · JPL
332339	2007 CB_{20}	—	February 6, 2007	Palomar	NEAT	·	1.2 km	MPC · JPL
332340	2007 CM_{36}	—	February 6, 2007	Mount Lemmon	Mount Lemmon Survey	BRG	1.7 km	MPC · JPL
332341	2007 CG_{39}	—	February 6, 2007	Mount Lemmon	Mount Lemmon Survey	·	890 m	MPC · JPL
332342	2007 CS_{62}	—	February 15, 2007	Catalina	CSS	·	2.2 km	MPC · JPL
332343	2007 DE_{3}	—	May 1, 2003	Kitt Peak	Spacewatch	·	1.8 km	MPC · JPL
332344	2007 DE_{6}	—	February 17, 2007	Kitt Peak	Spacewatch	·	2.1 km	MPC · JPL
332345	2007 DE_{13}	—	February 16, 2007	Palomar	NEAT	·	1.6 km	MPC · JPL
332346	2007 DQ_{34}	—	February 17, 2007	Kitt Peak	Spacewatch	MAR	1.3 km	MPC · JPL
332347	2007 DV_{39}	—	February 19, 2007	Kitt Peak	Spacewatch	·	1.1 km	MPC · JPL
332348	2007 DQ_{47}	—	February 21, 2007	Mount Lemmon	Mount Lemmon Survey	LEO	1.8 km	MPC · JPL
332349	2007 DK_{76}	—	February 21, 2007	Kitt Peak	Spacewatch	·	1.8 km	MPC · JPL
332350	2007 DR_{90}	—	February 23, 2007	Kitt Peak	Spacewatch	·	1.7 km	MPC · JPL
332351	2007 DY_{109}	—	February 23, 2007	Kitt Peak	Spacewatch	·	1.9 km	MPC · JPL
332352	2007 DY_{112}	—	April 11, 2003	Kitt Peak	Spacewatch	·	2.1 km	MPC · JPL
332353	2007 EU_{13}	—	March 9, 2007	Palomar	NEAT	·	3.3 km	MPC · JPL
332354	2007 EN_{14}	—	March 9, 2007	Catalina	CSS	EUN	1.3 km	MPC · JPL
332355	2007 EQ_{18}	—	February 22, 2007	Catalina	CSS	·	2.1 km	MPC · JPL
332356	2007 EL_{19}	—	January 27, 2007	Kitt Peak	Spacewatch	·	1.3 km	MPC · JPL
332357	2007 EO_{24}	—	March 10, 2007	Mount Lemmon	Mount Lemmon Survey	·	1.8 km	MPC · JPL
332358	2007 EH_{29}	—	March 9, 2007	Kitt Peak	Spacewatch	·	2.3 km	MPC · JPL
332359	2007 ES_{29}	—	March 9, 2007	Kitt Peak	Spacewatch	·	1.7 km	MPC · JPL
332360	2007 EA_{45}	—	March 9, 2007	Palomar	NEAT	H	600 m	MPC · JPL
332361	2007 EL_{60}	—	March 10, 2007	Kitt Peak	Spacewatch	·	1.7 km	MPC · JPL
332362	2007 EG_{68}	—	March 10, 2007	Kitt Peak	Spacewatch	·	1.9 km	MPC · JPL
332363	2007 EC_{91}	—	March 9, 2007	Palomar	NEAT	ADE	2.6 km	MPC · JPL
332364	2007 EF_{98}	—	March 11, 2007	Kitt Peak	Spacewatch	(194)	2.1 km	MPC · JPL
332365	2007 EX_{104}	—	March 11, 2007	Mount Lemmon	Mount Lemmon Survey	·	1.8 km	MPC · JPL
332366	2007 EL_{132}	—	March 9, 2007	Mount Lemmon	Mount Lemmon Survey	ADE	1.9 km	MPC · JPL
332367	2007 EP_{133}	—	March 9, 2007	Mount Lemmon	Mount Lemmon Survey	·	2.4 km	MPC · JPL
332368	2007 ED_{153}	—	March 12, 2007	Mount Lemmon	Mount Lemmon Survey	·	2.1 km	MPC · JPL
332369	2007 ER_{161}	—	March 15, 2007	Mount Lemmon	Mount Lemmon Survey	·	1.4 km	MPC · JPL
332370	2007 EO_{167}	—	March 13, 2007	Catalina	CSS	·	3.8 km	MPC · JPL
332371	2007 EG_{172}	—	March 14, 2007	Kitt Peak	Spacewatch	HNS	1.4 km	MPC · JPL
332372	2007 EQ_{181}	—	March 14, 2007	Kitt Peak	Spacewatch	·	2.4 km	MPC · JPL
332373	2007 EF_{183}	—	January 27, 2007	Mount Lemmon	Mount Lemmon Survey	KOR	2.2 km	MPC · JPL
332374	2007 EL_{193}	—	March 14, 2007	Catalina	CSS	·	4.3 km	MPC · JPL
332375	2007 ER_{200}	—	November 24, 2006	Mount Lemmon	Mount Lemmon Survey	·	2.4 km	MPC · JPL
332376	2007 EY_{200}	—	March 11, 2007	Purple Mountain	PMO NEO Survey Program	·	2.5 km	MPC · JPL
332377	2007 EG_{217}	—	March 10, 2007	Mount Lemmon	Mount Lemmon Survey	·	1.7 km	MPC · JPL
332378	2007 FC_{11}	—	March 16, 2007	Kitt Peak	Spacewatch	615	1.5 km	MPC · JPL
332379	2007 FJ_{18}	—	March 23, 2007	Pla D'Arguines	R. Ferrando	·	1.7 km	MPC · JPL
332380	2007 FA_{25}	—	March 20, 2007	Kitt Peak	Spacewatch	·	1.8 km	MPC · JPL
332381	2007 FF_{40}	—	November 22, 2005	Kitt Peak	Spacewatch	MAS	880 m	MPC · JPL
332382	2007 FC_{43}	—	March 22, 2007	Siding Spring	SSS	·	2.6 km	MPC · JPL
332383	2007 FU_{44}	—	March 26, 2007	Kitt Peak	Spacewatch	·	1.3 km	MPC · JPL
332384	2007 FT_{46}	—	March 29, 2007	Kitt Peak	Spacewatch	·	2.6 km	MPC · JPL
332385	2007 GO_{24}	—	April 11, 2007	Kitt Peak	Spacewatch	·	2.5 km	MPC · JPL
332386	2007 GF_{28}	—	March 12, 2007	Catalina	CSS	JUN	1.4 km	MPC · JPL
332387	2007 GJ_{45}	—	April 14, 2007	Kitt Peak	Spacewatch	·	1.6 km	MPC · JPL
332388	2007 GL_{50}	—	April 15, 2007	Socorro	LINEAR	·	3.5 km	MPC · JPL
332389	2007 GW_{52}	—	April 14, 2007	Kitt Peak	Spacewatch	·	3.4 km	MPC · JPL
332390	2007 HJ_{15}	—	December 25, 2005	Kitt Peak	Spacewatch	·	2.0 km	MPC · JPL
332391	2007 HK_{22}	—	April 18, 2007	Kitt Peak	Spacewatch	(12739)	1.8 km	MPC · JPL
332392	2007 HV_{40}	—	April 20, 2007	Kitt Peak	Spacewatch	NEM	2.5 km	MPC · JPL
332393	2007 HP_{46}	—	April 20, 2007	Kitt Peak	Spacewatch	·	2.9 km	MPC · JPL
332394	2007 HB_{48}	—	April 20, 2007	Kitt Peak	Spacewatch	·	2.1 km	MPC · JPL
332395	2007 HR_{53}	—	November 10, 2004	Kitt Peak	Spacewatch	·	2.7 km	MPC · JPL
332396	2007 HD_{58}	—	April 23, 2007	Catalina	CSS	·	2.8 km	MPC · JPL
332397	2007 JC_{12}	—	May 7, 2007	Kitt Peak	Spacewatch	·	5.9 km	MPC · JPL
332398	2007 JL_{15}	—	April 14, 2007	Kitt Peak	Spacewatch	EOS	1.8 km	MPC · JPL
332399	2007 JV_{19}	—	May 10, 2007	Catalina	CSS	·	2.2 km	MPC · JPL
332400	2007 JE_{33}	—	May 12, 2007	Mount Lemmon	Mount Lemmon Survey	·	2.8 km	MPC · JPL

== 332401–332500 ==
back to top

Designation			Discovery			Properties		Ref
Permanent	Provisional	Named after	Date	Site	Discoverer(s)	Category	Diam.	Ref
332401	2007 JC_{38}	—	May 12, 2007	Mount Lemmon	Mount Lemmon Survey	·	1.5 km	MPC · JPL
332402	2007 LX_{12}	—	June 9, 2007	Kitt Peak	Spacewatch	·	2.1 km	MPC · JPL
332403	2007 LY_{15}	—	June 10, 2007	Kitt Peak	Spacewatch	EUN	1.8 km	MPC · JPL
332404	2007 LH_{23}	—	June 13, 2007	Kitt Peak	Spacewatch	·	2.5 km	MPC · JPL
332405	2007 LM_{26}	—	June 14, 2007	Kitt Peak	Spacewatch	·	2.9 km	MPC · JPL
332406	2007 LQ_{34}	—	June 9, 2007	Kitt Peak	Spacewatch	·	1.8 km	MPC · JPL
332407	2007 MV_{6}	—	June 18, 2007	Kitt Peak	Spacewatch	·	2.4 km	MPC · JPL
332408	2007 MM_{13}	—	June 23, 2007	Catalina	CSS	APO +1km	970 m	MPC · JPL
332409	2007 NH_{2}	—	July 13, 2007	Andrushivka	Andrushivka	·	4.6 km	MPC · JPL
332410	2007 OH_{1}	—	July 17, 2007	Bergisch Gladbach	W. Bickel	·	5.6 km	MPC · JPL
332411	2007 PJ_{6}	—	August 8, 2007	Eskridge	G. Hug	·	5.2 km	MPC · JPL
332412	2007 PS_{23}	—	August 12, 2007	Socorro	LINEAR	·	3.8 km	MPC · JPL
332413	2007 PF_{43}	—	August 9, 2007	Socorro	LINEAR	·	3.2 km	MPC · JPL
332414	2007 QW_{9}	—	August 22, 2007	Socorro	LINEAR	H	630 m	MPC · JPL
332415	2007 RO_{43}	—	September 9, 2007	Kitt Peak	Spacewatch	·	3.3 km	MPC · JPL
332416	2007 RO_{109}	—	September 11, 2007	Kitt Peak	Spacewatch	(5)	1.5 km	MPC · JPL
332417	2007 RG_{122}	—	September 12, 2007	Catalina	CSS	·	3.6 km	MPC · JPL
332418	2007 RX_{182}	—	September 12, 2007	Catalina	CSS	TIR ·	3.5 km	MPC · JPL
332419	2007 RY_{188}	—	September 10, 2007	Catalina	CSS	·	4.6 km	MPC · JPL
332420	2007 RP_{269}	—	September 15, 2007	Anderson Mesa	LONEOS	LIX	6.8 km	MPC · JPL
332421	2007 RP_{272}	—	September 15, 2007	Kitt Peak	Spacewatch	·	3.2 km	MPC · JPL
332422	2007 RN_{286}	—	September 3, 2007	Vail-Jarnac	Jarnac	·	2.9 km	MPC · JPL
332423	2007 RE_{287}	—	September 8, 2007	Anderson Mesa	LONEOS	·	3.1 km	MPC · JPL
332424	2007 RN_{310}	—	September 5, 2007	Catalina	CSS	·	4.6 km	MPC · JPL
332425	2007 RY_{311}	—	September 9, 2007	Anderson Mesa	LONEOS	EOS	2.7 km	MPC · JPL
332426	2007 SQ_{23}	—	September 24, 2007	Kitt Peak	Spacewatch	·	2.0 km	MPC · JPL
332427	2007 TV_{23}	—	October 9, 2007	Socorro	LINEAR	H	680 m	MPC · JPL
332428	2007 TJ_{74}	—	October 10, 2007	Purple Mountain	PMO NEO Survey Program	·	5.3 km	MPC · JPL
332429	2007 TW_{139}	—	October 9, 2007	Catalina	CSS	·	4.0 km	MPC · JPL
332430	2007 TL_{180}	—	October 8, 2007	Catalina	CSS	·	3.6 km	MPC · JPL
332431	2007 TZ_{196}	—	October 8, 2007	Kitt Peak	Spacewatch	·	3.3 km	MPC · JPL
332432	2007 TL_{400}	—	October 13, 2007	Catalina	CSS	LUT	4.9 km	MPC · JPL
332433	2007 TV_{417}	—	October 5, 2007	Siding Spring	SSS	·	3.7 km	MPC · JPL
332434	2007 UZ_{4}	—	October 16, 2007	Andrushivka	Andrushivka	·	4.4 km	MPC · JPL
332435	2007 VE_{10}	—	October 8, 2007	Catalina	CSS	·	3.8 km	MPC · JPL
332436	2007 VR_{27}	—	November 2, 2007	Mount Lemmon	Mount Lemmon Survey	·	1.3 km	MPC · JPL
332437	2007 VV_{48}	—	October 9, 2007	Kitt Peak	Spacewatch	·	1.8 km	MPC · JPL
332438	2007 VA_{302}	—	October 14, 2007	Catalina	CSS	H	890 m	MPC · JPL
332439	2007 XJ_{34}	—	December 13, 2007	Socorro	LINEAR	·	1.1 km	MPC · JPL
332440	2007 XO_{39}	—	December 13, 2007	Socorro	LINEAR	·	1.7 km	MPC · JPL
332441	2007 XL_{52}	—	December 6, 2007	Mount Lemmon	Mount Lemmon Survey	V	650 m	MPC · JPL
332442	2007 YQ_{8}	—	December 16, 2007	Mount Lemmon	Mount Lemmon Survey	·	8.1 km	MPC · JPL
332443	2007 YO_{46}	—	December 30, 2007	Mount Lemmon	Mount Lemmon Survey	·	760 m	MPC · JPL
332444	2007 YT_{55}	—	December 14, 2007	Mount Lemmon	Mount Lemmon Survey	(2076)	1.2 km	MPC · JPL
332445	2008 AU_{2}	—	November 8, 2007	Mount Lemmon	Mount Lemmon Survey	·	1 km	MPC · JPL
332446	2008 AF_{4}	—	January 10, 2008	Socorro	LINEAR	APO · PHA	410 m	MPC · JPL
332447	2008 AR_{16}	—	January 10, 2008	Kitt Peak	Spacewatch	·	730 m	MPC · JPL
332448	2008 AJ_{37}	—	January 10, 2008	Kitt Peak	Spacewatch	·	680 m	MPC · JPL
332449	2008 AC_{62}	—	January 11, 2008	Kitt Peak	Spacewatch	·	840 m	MPC · JPL
332450	2008 BB_{14}	—	January 19, 2008	Mount Lemmon	Mount Lemmon Survey	·	980 m	MPC · JPL
332451	2008 BK_{23}	—	January 31, 2008	Mount Lemmon	Mount Lemmon Survey	·	860 m	MPC · JPL
332452	2008 CF_{12}	—	February 3, 2008	Kitt Peak	Spacewatch	NYS	1.3 km	MPC · JPL
332453	2008 CX_{14}	—	February 3, 2008	Kitt Peak	Spacewatch	·	970 m	MPC · JPL
332454	2008 CJ_{20}	—	February 6, 2008	Catalina	CSS	·	1.1 km	MPC · JPL
332455	2008 CH_{37}	—	February 2, 2008	Kitt Peak	Spacewatch	·	720 m	MPC · JPL
332456	2008 CN_{44}	—	February 2, 2008	Kitt Peak	Spacewatch	V	740 m	MPC · JPL
332457	2008 CG_{69}	—	February 8, 2008	Bergisch Gladbach	W. Bickel	NYS	880 m	MPC · JPL
332458	2008 CW_{84}	—	February 7, 2008	Kitt Peak	Spacewatch	·	880 m	MPC · JPL
332459	2008 CM_{97}	—	February 26, 2004	Kitt Peak	Deep Ecliptic Survey	·	1.0 km	MPC · JPL
332460	2008 CL_{118}	—	February 3, 2008	Catalina	CSS	·	1.0 km	MPC · JPL
332461	2008 CD_{132}	—	February 8, 2008	Kitt Peak	Spacewatch	·	800 m	MPC · JPL
332462	2008 CR_{153}	—	February 9, 2008	Kitt Peak	Spacewatch	·	1.2 km	MPC · JPL
332463	2008 CC_{159}	—	February 9, 2008	Catalina	CSS	·	960 m	MPC · JPL
332464	2008 CW_{163}	—	February 10, 2008	Catalina	CSS	·	670 m	MPC · JPL
332465	2008 CG_{195}	—	February 10, 2008	Kitt Peak	Spacewatch	·	1.2 km	MPC · JPL
332466	2008 DV_{43}	—	February 28, 2008	Kitt Peak	Spacewatch	·	1.3 km	MPC · JPL
332467	2008 DL_{53}	—	February 29, 2008	Mount Lemmon	Mount Lemmon Survey	·	1.3 km	MPC · JPL
332468	2008 DA_{56}	—	February 28, 2008	Kitt Peak	Spacewatch	·	1.4 km	MPC · JPL
332469	2008 DT_{69}	—	February 29, 2008	Kitt Peak	Spacewatch	·	1.0 km	MPC · JPL
332470	2008 DH_{81}	—	February 27, 2008	Kitt Peak	Spacewatch	·	1.1 km	MPC · JPL
332471	2008 DM_{81}	—	February 27, 2008	Kitt Peak	Spacewatch	·	870 m	MPC · JPL
332472	2008 DA_{89}	—	February 28, 2008	Kitt Peak	Spacewatch	NYS	1.0 km	MPC · JPL
332473	2008 EB_{51}	—	March 6, 2008	Kitt Peak	Spacewatch	NYS	1.2 km	MPC · JPL
332474	2008 EM_{59}	—	February 9, 2008	Kitt Peak	Spacewatch	·	790 m	MPC · JPL
332475	2008 ES_{73}	—	March 7, 2008	Catalina	CSS	·	1.2 km	MPC · JPL
332476	2008 EY_{73}	—	March 7, 2008	Kitt Peak	Spacewatch	NYS	1.1 km	MPC · JPL
332477	2008 ED_{83}	—	March 8, 2008	Socorro	LINEAR	·	1.7 km	MPC · JPL
332478	2008 EC_{96}	—	March 6, 2008	Mount Lemmon	Mount Lemmon Survey	·	1.2 km	MPC · JPL
332479	2008 EL_{100}	—	March 11, 2008	Catalina	CSS	·	950 m	MPC · JPL
332480	2008 EO_{108}	—	March 7, 2008	Mount Lemmon	Mount Lemmon Survey	·	700 m	MPC · JPL
332481	2008 EN_{115}	—	March 8, 2008	Kitt Peak	Spacewatch	·	1.1 km	MPC · JPL
332482	2008 EQ_{122}	—	March 9, 2008	Kitt Peak	Spacewatch	·	1.1 km	MPC · JPL
332483	2008 EM_{128}	—	March 11, 2008	Kitt Peak	Spacewatch	·	1.2 km	MPC · JPL
332484	2008 ET_{133}	—	March 11, 2008	Mount Lemmon	Mount Lemmon Survey	·	870 m	MPC · JPL
332485	2008 EP_{136}	—	March 11, 2008	Kitt Peak	Spacewatch	·	1.1 km	MPC · JPL
332486	2008 EB_{157}	—	March 13, 2008	Kitt Peak	Spacewatch	·	2.1 km	MPC · JPL
332487	2008 ES_{158}	—	March 10, 2008	Kitt Peak	Spacewatch	·	1.2 km	MPC · JPL
332488	2008 EY_{165}	—	March 4, 2008	Mount Lemmon	Mount Lemmon Survey	·	1.1 km	MPC · JPL
332489	2008 FP_{18}	—	March 27, 2008	Mount Lemmon	Mount Lemmon Survey	MAS	710 m	MPC · JPL
332490	2008 FJ_{20}	—	March 27, 2008	Mount Lemmon	Mount Lemmon Survey	·	830 m	MPC · JPL
332491	2008 FU_{55}	—	March 4, 2008	Kitt Peak	Spacewatch	KON	2.5 km	MPC · JPL
332492	2008 FK_{57}	—	March 28, 2008	Mount Lemmon	Mount Lemmon Survey	·	1.4 km	MPC · JPL
332493	2008 FD_{60}	—	March 29, 2008	Catalina	CSS	·	1.3 km	MPC · JPL
332494	2008 FY_{68}	—	October 21, 2006	Mount Lemmon	Mount Lemmon Survey	NYS	1.2 km	MPC · JPL
332495	2008 FQ_{73}	—	March 30, 2008	Kitt Peak	Spacewatch	V	710 m	MPC · JPL
332496	2008 FW_{73}	—	March 30, 2008	Catalina	CSS	·	1.3 km	MPC · JPL
332497	2008 FQ_{103}	—	March 30, 2008	Kitt Peak	Spacewatch	V	800 m	MPC · JPL
332498	2008 FN_{110}	—	March 31, 2008	Mount Lemmon	Mount Lemmon Survey	(2076)	750 m	MPC · JPL
332499	2008 FG_{113}	—	March 31, 2008	Kitt Peak	Spacewatch	MAS	760 m	MPC · JPL
332500	2008 FQ_{115}	—	March 31, 2008	Mount Lemmon	Mount Lemmon Survey	·	1.0 km	MPC · JPL

== 332501–332600 ==
back to top

Designation			Discovery			Properties		Ref
Permanent	Provisional	Named after	Date	Site	Discoverer(s)	Category	Diam.	Ref
332501	2008 FE_{117}	—	March 31, 2008	Kitt Peak	Spacewatch	MAS	730 m	MPC · JPL
332502	2008 FO_{118}	—	March 31, 2008	Kitt Peak	Spacewatch	·	1.5 km	MPC · JPL
332503	2008 FZ_{127}	—	March 28, 2008	Kitt Peak	Spacewatch	·	1.1 km	MPC · JPL
332504	2008 FF_{128}	—	March 28, 2008	Mount Lemmon	Mount Lemmon Survey	MAS	780 m	MPC · JPL
332505	2008 GX_{11}	—	April 1, 2008	Kitt Peak	Spacewatch	·	1.2 km	MPC · JPL
332506	2008 GV_{16}	—	April 3, 2008	Mount Lemmon	Mount Lemmon Survey	MAS	690 m	MPC · JPL
332507	2008 GE_{51}	—	February 9, 2008	Mount Lemmon	Mount Lemmon Survey	MAS	750 m	MPC · JPL
332508	2008 GA_{52}	—	April 5, 2008	Mount Lemmon	Mount Lemmon Survey	·	790 m	MPC · JPL
332509	2008 GA_{82}	—	April 8, 2008	Kitt Peak	Spacewatch	NYS	1.4 km	MPC · JPL
332510	2008 GG_{82}	—	April 8, 2008	Kitt Peak	Spacewatch	·	1.5 km	MPC · JPL
332511	2008 GD_{87}	—	April 10, 2008	Kitt Peak	Spacewatch	·	900 m	MPC · JPL
332512	2008 GK_{102}	—	April 10, 2008	Kitt Peak	Spacewatch	NYS	1.2 km	MPC · JPL
332513	2008 GE_{107}	—	July 8, 2005	Kitt Peak	Spacewatch	V	720 m	MPC · JPL
332514	2008 GX_{143}	—	April 1, 2008	Mount Lemmon	Mount Lemmon Survey	V	540 m	MPC · JPL
332515	2008 GS_{145}	—	April 12, 2008	Catalina	CSS	·	1.7 km	MPC · JPL
332516	2008 HB_{14}	—	May 11, 2000	Kitt Peak	Spacewatch	·	1.5 km	MPC · JPL
332517	2008 JB_{4}	—	May 1, 2008	Catalina	CSS	PHO	1.2 km	MPC · JPL
332518	2008 JK_{13}	—	May 4, 2008	Mount Lemmon	Mount Lemmon Survey	·	890 m	MPC · JPL
332519	2008 JG_{26}	—	November 4, 2005	Mount Lemmon	Mount Lemmon Survey	·	2.3 km	MPC · JPL
332520	2008 JJ_{36}	—	May 3, 2008	Mount Lemmon	Mount Lemmon Survey	·	1.2 km	MPC · JPL
332521	2008 KB_{28}	—	May 15, 2008	Mount Lemmon	Mount Lemmon Survey	·	1.7 km	MPC · JPL
332522	2008 KB_{35}	—	May 27, 2008	Kitt Peak	Spacewatch	·	1.3 km	MPC · JPL
332523	2008 KD_{41}	—	May 30, 2008	Kitt Peak	Spacewatch	·	1.3 km	MPC · JPL
332524	2008 LP_{4}	—	May 29, 2008	Kitt Peak	Spacewatch	V	820 m	MPC · JPL
332525	2008 LB_{6}	—	June 3, 2008	Kitt Peak	Spacewatch	·	1.1 km	MPC · JPL
332526	2008 LK_{8}	—	June 6, 2008	Kitt Peak	Spacewatch	·	1.8 km	MPC · JPL
332527	2008 NZ_{4}	—	July 2, 2008	Kitt Peak	Spacewatch	·	1.7 km	MPC · JPL
332528	2008 NE_{5}	—	July 11, 2008	Siding Spring	SSS	BRG	2.1 km	MPC · JPL
332529	2008 OJ_{3}	—	July 27, 2008	Bisei SG Center	BATTeRS	·	2.4 km	MPC · JPL
332530 Canders	2008 OS_{18}	Canders	July 29, 2008	Baldone	K. Černis, I. Eglītis	·	1.7 km	MPC · JPL
332531	2008 OP_{19}	—	July 29, 2008	Kitt Peak	Spacewatch	·	1.7 km	MPC · JPL
332532	2008 OU_{19}	—	July 29, 2008	Kitt Peak	Spacewatch	·	1.4 km	MPC · JPL
332533	2008 OS_{23}	—	July 30, 2008	Mount Lemmon	Mount Lemmon Survey	·	2.9 km	MPC · JPL
332534	2008 OW_{24}	—	July 30, 2008	Catalina	CSS	·	3.6 km	MPC · JPL
332535	2008 PJ_{2}	—	August 2, 2008	La Sagra	OAM	·	2.9 km	MPC · JPL
332536	2008 PX_{7}	—	June 7, 2008	Catalina	CSS	·	2.0 km	MPC · JPL
332537	2008 PD_{11}	—	August 6, 2008	Marly	P. Kocher	·	3.3 km	MPC · JPL
332538	2008 PJ_{17}	—	August 10, 2008	Črni Vrh	Skvarč, J.	·	1.4 km	MPC · JPL
332539	2008 PN_{20}	—	August 2, 2008	Siding Spring	SSS	·	4.8 km	MPC · JPL
332540	2008 PN_{21}	—	August 6, 2008	Siding Spring	SSS	GAL	2.4 km	MPC · JPL
332541	2008 QG_{6}	—	August 25, 2008	Dauban	Kugel, F.	·	2.1 km	MPC · JPL
332542	2008 QT_{8}	—	August 25, 2008	La Sagra	OAM	AEO	1.4 km	MPC · JPL
332543	2008 QE_{10}	—	August 26, 2008	La Sagra	OAM	·	2.0 km	MPC · JPL
332544	2008 QX_{10}	—	August 26, 2008	La Sagra	OAM	JUN	1.5 km	MPC · JPL
332545	2008 QM_{15}	—	August 27, 2008	Altschwendt	W. Ries	·	2.4 km	MPC · JPL
332546	2008 QH_{16}	—	August 28, 2008	Hibiscus	S. F. Hönig, Teamo, N.	·	2.4 km	MPC · JPL
332547	2008 QV_{20}	—	August 26, 2008	Socorro	LINEAR	·	2.8 km	MPC · JPL
332548	2008 QP_{24}	—	August 29, 2008	Dauban	Kugel, F.	·	2.4 km	MPC · JPL
332549	2008 QH_{32}	—	August 30, 2008	Socorro	LINEAR	·	1.8 km	MPC · JPL
332550	2008 QJ_{41}	—	August 21, 2008	Kitt Peak	Spacewatch	KOR	1.6 km	MPC · JPL
332551	2008 RA	—	September 1, 2008	La Sagra	OAM	·	2.2 km	MPC · JPL
332552	2008 RM_{1}	—	September 3, 2008	Hibiscus	Pelle, J. C.	·	2.6 km	MPC · JPL
332553	2008 RY_{3}	—	September 2, 2008	Kitt Peak	Spacewatch	·	1.9 km	MPC · JPL
332554	2008 RX_{21}	—	September 2, 2008	La Sagra	OAM	·	1.6 km	MPC · JPL
332555	2008 RH_{26}	—	September 9, 2008	Catalina	CSS	·	3.0 km	MPC · JPL
332556	2008 RB_{29}	—	September 2, 2008	Kitt Peak	Spacewatch	615	1.3 km	MPC · JPL
332557	2008 RA_{45}	—	September 2, 2008	Kitt Peak	Spacewatch	·	1.7 km	MPC · JPL
332558	2008 RE_{51}	—	September 3, 2008	Kitt Peak	Spacewatch	·	1.7 km	MPC · JPL
332559	2008 RT_{98}	—	September 8, 2008	Dauban	Kugel, F.	NAE	4.5 km	MPC · JPL
332560	2008 RO_{100}	—	September 4, 2008	Kitt Peak	Spacewatch	·	1.8 km	MPC · JPL
332561	2008 RT_{102}	—	September 4, 2008	Kitt Peak	Spacewatch	·	2.8 km	MPC · JPL
332562	2008 RH_{104}	—	September 5, 2008	Kitt Peak	Spacewatch	VER	2.4 km	MPC · JPL
332563	2008 RO_{113}	—	September 5, 2008	Kitt Peak	Spacewatch	EOS	1.8 km	MPC · JPL
332564	2008 RB_{117}	—	September 7, 2008	Mount Lemmon	Mount Lemmon Survey	NEM	2.9 km	MPC · JPL
332565	2008 RT_{117}	—	September 9, 2008	Kitt Peak	Spacewatch	·	3.6 km	MPC · JPL
332566	2008 RY_{129}	—	September 6, 2008	Catalina	CSS	·	2.3 km	MPC · JPL
332567	2008 RA_{132}	—	September 6, 2008	Catalina	CSS	JUN	1.2 km	MPC · JPL
332568	2008 RW_{133}	—	August 12, 2008	La Sagra	OAM	·	3.1 km	MPC · JPL
332569	2008 SH	—	September 18, 2008	Sandlot	G. Hug	·	2.8 km	MPC · JPL
332570	2008 SN_{12}	—	September 24, 2008	Goodricke-Pigott	R. A. Tucker	·	1.5 km	MPC · JPL
332571	2008 SX_{38}	—	September 20, 2008	Kitt Peak	Spacewatch	(31811)	3.0 km	MPC · JPL
332572	2008 SM_{45}	—	September 20, 2008	Kitt Peak	Spacewatch	·	2.8 km	MPC · JPL
332573	2008 SZ_{51}	—	September 20, 2008	Mount Lemmon	Mount Lemmon Survey	·	3.4 km	MPC · JPL
332574	2008 SR_{53}	—	September 20, 2008	Mount Lemmon	Mount Lemmon Survey	·	1.8 km	MPC · JPL
332575	2008 SU_{55}	—	September 20, 2008	Kitt Peak	Spacewatch	·	3.8 km	MPC · JPL
332576	2008 SD_{67}	—	September 21, 2008	Mount Lemmon	Mount Lemmon Survey	·	2.5 km	MPC · JPL
332577	2008 SB_{73}	—	September 22, 2008	Kitt Peak	Spacewatch	VER	3.6 km	MPC · JPL
332578	2008 SM_{80}	—	September 23, 2008	Catalina	CSS	·	2.1 km	MPC · JPL
332579	2008 SD_{82}	—	September 22, 2008	Kitt Peak	Spacewatch	·	3.3 km	MPC · JPL
332580	2008 SY_{83}	—	September 24, 2008	Dauban	Kugel, F.	·	3.3 km	MPC · JPL
332581	2008 SG_{93}	—	September 21, 2008	Kitt Peak	Spacewatch	EOS	2.0 km	MPC · JPL
332582	2008 SO_{97}	—	September 21, 2008	Kitt Peak	Spacewatch	·	2.5 km	MPC · JPL
332583	2008 SL_{98}	—	September 9, 2008	Mount Lemmon	Mount Lemmon Survey	·	2.4 km	MPC · JPL
332584	2008 SQ_{128}	—	September 22, 2008	Kitt Peak	Spacewatch	EUP	4.3 km	MPC · JPL
332585	2008 SK_{143}	—	September 24, 2008	Mount Lemmon	Mount Lemmon Survey	·	3.0 km	MPC · JPL
332586	2008 SS_{149}	—	September 29, 2008	Dauban	Kugel, F.	·	2.1 km	MPC · JPL
332587	2008 SF_{151}	—	September 28, 2008	Dauban	Kugel, F.	·	2.6 km	MPC · JPL
332588	2008 SC_{153}	—	September 22, 2008	Socorro	LINEAR	·	1.9 km	MPC · JPL
332589	2008 SU_{165}	—	September 28, 2008	Socorro	LINEAR	·	4.4 km	MPC · JPL
332590	2008 SD_{170}	—	September 21, 2008	Mount Lemmon	Mount Lemmon Survey	·	3.0 km	MPC · JPL
332591	2008 SP_{174}	—	September 22, 2008	Catalina	CSS	JUN	1.7 km	MPC · JPL
332592	2008 SR_{174}	—	September 22, 2008	Catalina	CSS	·	4.3 km	MPC · JPL
332593	2008 SH_{177}	—	September 23, 2008	Mount Lemmon	Mount Lemmon Survey	·	2.2 km	MPC · JPL
332594	2008 SE_{185}	—	September 24, 2008	Kitt Peak	Spacewatch	·	3.1 km	MPC · JPL
332595	2008 SD_{201}	—	September 26, 2008	Kitt Peak	Spacewatch	·	3.0 km	MPC · JPL
332596	2008 SQ_{223}	—	September 25, 2008	Mount Lemmon	Mount Lemmon Survey	·	3.1 km	MPC · JPL
332597	2008 SK_{229}	—	September 28, 2008	Mount Lemmon	Mount Lemmon Survey	PAD	1.9 km	MPC · JPL
332598	2008 SL_{234}	—	September 28, 2008	Mount Lemmon	Mount Lemmon Survey	EOS	2.6 km	MPC · JPL
332599	2008 SH_{251}	—	September 24, 2008	Kitt Peak	Spacewatch	EOS	2.4 km	MPC · JPL
332600	2008 SZ_{252}	—	September 21, 2008	Kitt Peak	Spacewatch	·	3.2 km	MPC · JPL

== 332601–332700 ==
back to top

Designation			Discovery			Properties		Ref
Permanent	Provisional	Named after	Date	Site	Discoverer(s)	Category	Diam.	Ref
332601	2008 SW_{258}	—	September 23, 2008	Kitt Peak	Spacewatch	EOS	1.8 km	MPC · JPL
332602	2008 SP_{264}	—	September 25, 2008	Kitt Peak	Spacewatch	EOS ·	4.6 km	MPC · JPL
332603	2008 SW_{276}	—	September 24, 2008	Mount Lemmon	Mount Lemmon Survey	·	4.2 km	MPC · JPL
332604	2008 SF_{282}	—	September 28, 2008	Mount Lemmon	Mount Lemmon Survey	·	2.7 km	MPC · JPL
332605	2008 SW_{285}	—	September 21, 2008	Kitt Peak	Spacewatch	·	2.2 km	MPC · JPL
332606	2008 SC_{287}	—	September 23, 2008	Kitt Peak	Spacewatch	·	3.2 km	MPC · JPL
332607	2008 SO_{291}	—	September 23, 2008	Kitt Peak	Spacewatch	·	2.2 km	MPC · JPL
332608	2008 TH_{6}	—	October 3, 2008	La Sagra	OAM	GEF	1.6 km	MPC · JPL
332609	2008 TR_{6}	—	October 3, 2008	La Sagra	OAM	·	2.7 km	MPC · JPL
332610	2008 TA_{12}	—	October 1, 2008	Mount Lemmon	Mount Lemmon Survey	·	2.0 km	MPC · JPL
332611	2008 TG_{15}	—	October 1, 2003	Kitt Peak	Spacewatch	·	1.9 km	MPC · JPL
332612	2008 TF_{16}	—	October 1, 2008	Mount Lemmon	Mount Lemmon Survey	EOS	1.8 km	MPC · JPL
332613	2008 TF_{33}	—	October 1, 2008	Kitt Peak	Spacewatch	EOS	1.9 km	MPC · JPL
332614	2008 TP_{36}	—	October 1, 2008	Mount Lemmon	Mount Lemmon Survey	ANF	1.7 km	MPC · JPL
332615	2008 TT_{50}	—	October 2, 2008	Kitt Peak	Spacewatch	EOS	5.2 km	MPC · JPL
332616	2008 TM_{61}	—	October 2, 2008	Kitt Peak	Spacewatch	·	2.4 km	MPC · JPL
332617	2008 TZ_{91}	—	October 4, 2008	Catalina	CSS	·	2.5 km	MPC · JPL
332618	2008 TX_{97}	—	October 6, 2008	Kitt Peak	Spacewatch	MRX	1.2 km	MPC · JPL
332619	2008 TO_{98}	—	October 6, 2008	Kitt Peak	Spacewatch	·	2.8 km	MPC · JPL
332620	2008 TP_{104}	—	October 6, 2008	Kitt Peak	Spacewatch	·	2.9 km	MPC · JPL
332621	2008 TW_{105}	—	October 6, 2008	Kitt Peak	Spacewatch	VER	2.9 km	MPC · JPL
332622	2008 TK_{111}	—	October 6, 2008	Catalina	CSS	·	6.4 km	MPC · JPL
332623	2008 TY_{111}	—	October 6, 2008	Catalina	CSS	·	3.0 km	MPC · JPL
332624	2008 TJ_{112}	—	October 6, 2008	Catalina	CSS	MRX	1.3 km	MPC · JPL
332625	2008 TC_{113}	—	October 6, 2008	Kitt Peak	Spacewatch	·	3.5 km	MPC · JPL
332626	2008 TU_{118}	—	February 14, 2005	Catalina	CSS	EOS	2.3 km	MPC · JPL
332627	2008 TF_{131}	—	October 8, 2008	Mount Lemmon	Mount Lemmon Survey	·	2.1 km	MPC · JPL
332628	2008 TT_{132}	—	October 8, 2008	Mount Lemmon	Mount Lemmon Survey	·	3.5 km	MPC · JPL
332629	2008 TK_{138}	—	September 23, 2008	Kitt Peak	Spacewatch	HYG	3.2 km	MPC · JPL
332630	2008 TT_{157}	—	October 4, 2008	Catalina	CSS	·	2.6 km	MPC · JPL
332631	2008 TF_{184}	—	October 6, 2008	Socorro	LINEAR	·	2.2 km	MPC · JPL
332632 Pharos	2008 UO_{1}	Pharos	October 22, 2008	Vallemare Borbona	V. S. Casulli	·	3.0 km	MPC · JPL
332633	2008 UK_{4}	—	October 24, 2008	Tzec Maun	E. Schwab	·	2.9 km	MPC · JPL
332634	2008 UM_{4}	—	October 24, 2008	Sierra Stars	Tozzi, F.	TIR	4.2 km	MPC · JPL
332635	2008 UB_{18}	—	October 18, 2008	Kitt Peak	Spacewatch	KOR	1.4 km	MPC · JPL
332636	2008 UR_{27}	—	October 20, 2008	Kitt Peak	Spacewatch	·	2.5 km	MPC · JPL
332637	2008 UJ_{58}	—	October 21, 2008	Kitt Peak	Spacewatch	·	2.8 km	MPC · JPL
332638	2008 UD_{71}	—	October 21, 2008	Kitt Peak	Spacewatch	·	3.7 km	MPC · JPL
332639	2008 UG_{79}	—	October 22, 2008	Kitt Peak	Spacewatch	·	1.9 km	MPC · JPL
332640	2008 UD_{83}	—	October 22, 2008	Mount Lemmon	Mount Lemmon Survey	·	2.4 km	MPC · JPL
332641	2008 UK_{91}	—	October 27, 2008	Socorro	LINEAR	·	2.3 km	MPC · JPL
332642	2008 UZ_{98}	—	October 28, 2008	Socorro	LINEAR	·	5.8 km	MPC · JPL
332643	2008 UC_{106}	—	October 21, 2008	Kitt Peak	Spacewatch	·	2.6 km	MPC · JPL
332644	2008 UV_{113}	—	October 22, 2008	Kitt Peak	Spacewatch	·	3.6 km	MPC · JPL
332645	2008 UY_{126}	—	October 22, 2008	Kitt Peak	Spacewatch	THM	2.3 km	MPC · JPL
332646	2008 UJ_{128}	—	October 22, 2008	Kitt Peak	Spacewatch	·	4.1 km	MPC · JPL
332647	2008 UF_{143}	—	October 23, 2008	Kitt Peak	Spacewatch	THM	2.8 km	MPC · JPL
332648	2008 UX_{194}	—	October 26, 2008	Kitt Peak	Spacewatch	·	2.3 km	MPC · JPL
332649	2008 UM_{200}	—	October 26, 2008	Socorro	LINEAR	MRX	1.2 km	MPC · JPL
332650	2008 UG_{203}	—	October 28, 2008	Socorro	LINEAR	VER	5.0 km	MPC · JPL
332651	2008 UF_{214}	—	October 24, 2008	Catalina	CSS	·	6.0 km	MPC · JPL
332652	2008 UR_{229}	—	October 3, 2002	Palomar	NEAT	EOS	2.7 km	MPC · JPL
332653	2008 UN_{255}	—	October 27, 2008	Mount Lemmon	Mount Lemmon Survey	·	2.4 km	MPC · JPL
332654	2008 UK_{353}	—	October 24, 2008	Kitt Peak	Spacewatch	·	2.5 km	MPC · JPL
332655	2008 VF_{26}	—	November 2, 2008	Catalina	CSS	JUN	1.6 km	MPC · JPL
332656	2008 VG_{51}	—	November 4, 2008	Kitt Peak	Spacewatch	·	2.2 km	MPC · JPL
332657	2008 VU_{74}	—	November 3, 2008	Mount Lemmon	Mount Lemmon Survey	·	1.9 km	MPC · JPL
332658	2008 VD_{75}	—	November 6, 2008	Catalina	CSS	·	2.6 km	MPC · JPL
332659	2008 WG_{7}	—	November 17, 2008	Kitt Peak	Spacewatch	·	4.9 km	MPC · JPL
332660	2008 WL_{7}	—	November 17, 2008	Kitt Peak	Spacewatch	HYG	3.1 km	MPC · JPL
332661	2008 WO_{7}	—	November 17, 2008	Kitt Peak	Spacewatch	·	2.7 km	MPC · JPL
332662	2008 WN_{18}	—	November 17, 2008	Kitt Peak	Spacewatch	·	2.7 km	MPC · JPL
332663	2008 WA_{55}	—	November 19, 2008	Mount Lemmon	Mount Lemmon Survey	·	530 m	MPC · JPL
332664	2008 WB_{60}	—	November 19, 2008	Socorro	LINEAR	·	2.3 km	MPC · JPL
332665	2008 WM_{81}	—	November 20, 2008	Kitt Peak	Spacewatch	·	3.7 km	MPC · JPL
332666	2008 WO_{96}	—	November 27, 2008	Charleston	Astronomical Research Observatory	·	4.0 km	MPC · JPL
332667	2008 WB_{103}	—	July 31, 2008	Mount Lemmon	Mount Lemmon Survey	·	2.7 km	MPC · JPL
332668	2008 YX_{1}	—	December 19, 2008	Socorro	LINEAR	·	3.7 km	MPC · JPL
332669	2008 YH_{108}	—	December 29, 2008	Kitt Peak	Spacewatch	·	1.3 km	MPC · JPL
332670	2009 AR_{23}	—	October 13, 1993	Kitt Peak	Spacewatch	·	810 m	MPC · JPL
332671	2009 AO_{46}	—	September 10, 2007	Kitt Peak	Spacewatch	NYS	1.5 km	MPC · JPL
332672	2009 BJ_{29}	—	October 11, 2007	Catalina	CSS	·	1.7 km	MPC · JPL
332673	2009 BV_{38}	—	January 16, 2009	Kitt Peak	Spacewatch	·	3.2 km	MPC · JPL
332674	2009 BC_{44}	—	January 16, 2009	Kitt Peak	Spacewatch	GEF	1.4 km	MPC · JPL
332675	2009 BS_{138}	—	September 11, 2007	Mount Lemmon	Mount Lemmon Survey	·	1.2 km	MPC · JPL
332676	2009 BK_{151}	—	January 29, 2009	Mount Lemmon	Mount Lemmon Survey	·	4.5 km	MPC · JPL
332677	2009 BE_{171}	—	October 10, 2007	Kitt Peak	Spacewatch	KOR	1.3 km	MPC · JPL
332678	2009 CW_{21}	—	February 1, 2009	Kitt Peak	Spacewatch	·	1.0 km	MPC · JPL
332679	2009 CK_{43}	—	February 14, 2009	Kitt Peak	Spacewatch	MAS	860 m	MPC · JPL
332680	2009 DR_{51}	—	November 18, 2003	Kitt Peak	Spacewatch	·	1.4 km	MPC · JPL
332681	2009 DL_{120}	—	September 4, 2007	Mount Lemmon	Mount Lemmon Survey	MAS	650 m	MPC · JPL
332682	2009 DO_{141}	—	October 10, 2007	Catalina	CSS	ADE	1.9 km	MPC · JPL
332683	2009 DL_{142}	—	February 20, 2009	Kitt Peak	Spacewatch	MRX	1.1 km	MPC · JPL
332684	2009 FT_{56}	—	February 20, 2009	Siding Spring	SSS	H	670 m	MPC · JPL
332685	2009 HH_{36}	—	April 19, 2009	Kitt Peak	Spacewatch	T_{j} (2.99) · centaur	33 km	MPC · JPL
332686	2009 OL_{2}	—	July 19, 2009	La Sagra	OAM	·	690 m	MPC · JPL
332687	2009 OV_{2}	—	July 19, 2009	Siding Spring	SSS	·	1.7 km	MPC · JPL
332688	2009 OS_{24}	—	July 27, 2009	Catalina	CSS	V	630 m	MPC · JPL
332689	2009 PR_{17}	—	August 2, 2009	Siding Spring	SSS	·	1.2 km	MPC · JPL
332690	2009 PZ_{17}	—	August 15, 2009	Catalina	CSS	·	1.2 km	MPC · JPL
332691	2009 QP_{7}	—	August 18, 2009	Črni Vrh	Matičič, S.	·	610 m	MPC · JPL
332692	2009 QQ_{30}	—	August 21, 2009	Socorro	LINEAR	·	2.0 km	MPC · JPL
332693	2009 QO_{45}	—	August 28, 2009	Catalina	CSS	NYS	1.4 km	MPC · JPL
332694	2009 QM_{56}	—	August 19, 2009	Kitt Peak	Spacewatch	·	2.1 km	MPC · JPL
332695	2009 RM_{1}	—	September 10, 2009	La Sagra	OAM	·	2.4 km	MPC · JPL
332696	2009 RM_{19}	—	September 14, 2009	La Sagra	OAM	·	690 m	MPC · JPL
332697	2009 RO_{19}	—	September 14, 2009	La Sagra	OAM	·	1.3 km	MPC · JPL
332698	2009 RG_{21}	—	October 4, 2006	Mount Lemmon	Mount Lemmon Survey	·	1.3 km	MPC · JPL
332699	2009 RR_{22}	—	September 15, 2009	Kitt Peak	Spacewatch	·	780 m	MPC · JPL
332700	2009 RB_{30}	—	September 14, 2009	Kitt Peak	Spacewatch	·	1.5 km	MPC · JPL

== 332701–332800 ==
back to top

Designation			Discovery			Properties		Ref
Permanent	Provisional	Named after	Date	Site	Discoverer(s)	Category	Diam.	Ref
332701	2009 RG_{35}	—	September 14, 2009	Kitt Peak	Spacewatch	·	1.4 km	MPC · JPL
332702	2009 RS_{41}	—	September 15, 2009	Kitt Peak	Spacewatch	·	1.6 km	MPC · JPL
332703	2009 RV_{51}	—	September 15, 2009	Kitt Peak	Spacewatch	NYS	1.0 km	MPC · JPL
332704	2009 RV_{55}	—	October 29, 2005	Mount Lemmon	Mount Lemmon Survey	·	1.5 km	MPC · JPL
332705	2009 RA_{56}	—	September 15, 2009	Kitt Peak	Spacewatch	·	3.1 km	MPC · JPL
332706 Karlheidlas	2009 RW_{57}	Karlheidlas	September 13, 2009	ESA OGS	ESA OGS	·	940 m	MPC · JPL
332707	2009 RR_{70}	—	September 12, 2009	Kitt Peak	Spacewatch	MAS	720 m	MPC · JPL
332708	2009 SE_{35}	—	September 16, 2009	Kitt Peak	Spacewatch	·	990 m	MPC · JPL
332709	2009 SR_{53}	—	September 17, 2009	Catalina	CSS	·	1.7 km	MPC · JPL
332710	2009 SW_{73}	—	September 17, 2009	Kitt Peak	Spacewatch	·	2.1 km	MPC · JPL
332711	2009 SE_{77}	—	September 17, 2009	Kitt Peak	Spacewatch	·	1.1 km	MPC · JPL
332712	2009 SF_{80}	—	April 11, 2005	Mount Lemmon	Mount Lemmon Survey	·	600 m	MPC · JPL
332713	2009 SL_{83}	—	September 18, 2009	Mount Lemmon	Mount Lemmon Survey	(2076)	680 m	MPC · JPL
332714	2009 SS_{100}	—	September 18, 2009	Kitt Peak	Spacewatch	·	1.2 km	MPC · JPL
332715	2009 SX_{138}	—	September 18, 2009	Mount Lemmon	Mount Lemmon Survey	·	840 m	MPC · JPL
332716	2009 SO_{140}	—	September 19, 2009	Kitt Peak	Spacewatch	·	1.2 km	MPC · JPL
332717	2009 SJ_{171}	—	September 28, 2009	Wildberg	R. Apitzsch	·	1.3 km	MPC · JPL
332718	2009 SV_{176}	—	September 19, 2009	Purple Mountain	PMO NEO Survey Program	V	760 m	MPC · JPL
332719	2009 SL_{213}	—	September 23, 2009	Catalina	CSS	PHO	1.5 km	MPC · JPL
332720	2009 ST_{213}	—	March 23, 2002	Kitt Peak	Spacewatch	·	2.3 km	MPC · JPL
332721	2009 SA_{225}	—	September 25, 2009	Kitt Peak	Spacewatch	·	1.3 km	MPC · JPL
332722	2009 ST_{233}	—	September 22, 2009	Mount Lemmon	Mount Lemmon Survey	ADE	3.7 km	MPC · JPL
332723	2009 SB_{262}	—	September 23, 2009	Kitt Peak	Spacewatch	V	780 m	MPC · JPL
332724	2009 SR_{273}	—	September 25, 2009	Kitt Peak	Spacewatch	·	1.9 km	MPC · JPL
332725	2009 SZ_{274}	—	September 25, 2009	Kitt Peak	Spacewatch	·	1.8 km	MPC · JPL
332726	2009 SF_{276}	—	March 12, 2008	Kitt Peak	Spacewatch	·	1.1 km	MPC · JPL
332727	2009 SX_{282}	—	September 25, 2009	Kitt Peak	Spacewatch	·	1.4 km	MPC · JPL
332728	2009 SD_{283}	—	September 25, 2009	Kitt Peak	Spacewatch	·	1.8 km	MPC · JPL
332729	2009 SO_{283}	—	September 25, 2009	Kitt Peak	Spacewatch	·	1.2 km	MPC · JPL
332730	2009 SG_{289}	—	September 25, 2009	Kitt Peak	Spacewatch	·	3.3 km	MPC · JPL
332731	2009 SX_{315}	—	September 19, 2009	Kitt Peak	Spacewatch	·	1.2 km	MPC · JPL
332732	2009 SZ_{319}	—	September 20, 2009	Kitt Peak	Spacewatch	·	990 m	MPC · JPL
332733 Drolshagen	2009 SV_{321}	Drolshagen	September 21, 2009	La Sagra	OAM	·	1.5 km	MPC · JPL
332734	2009 SY_{327}	—	September 26, 2009	Kitt Peak	Spacewatch	·	1.0 km	MPC · JPL
332735	2009 SX_{334}	—	April 11, 2007	Kitt Peak	Spacewatch	·	3.2 km	MPC · JPL
332736	2009 ST_{339}	—	September 22, 2009	Mount Lemmon	Mount Lemmon Survey	EOS	2.7 km	MPC · JPL
332737	2009 SC_{348}	—	September 17, 2009	Kitt Peak	Spacewatch	·	1.5 km	MPC · JPL
332738	2009 SS_{349}	—	September 30, 2009	Mount Lemmon	Mount Lemmon Survey	·	2.0 km	MPC · JPL
332739	2009 SL_{352}	—	September 20, 2009	Mount Lemmon	Mount Lemmon Survey	·	810 m	MPC · JPL
332740	2009 TT_{3}	—	October 10, 2009	La Sagra	OAM	·	2.6 km	MPC · JPL
332741	2009 TU_{3}	—	September 26, 1998	Socorro	LINEAR	·	1.8 km	MPC · JPL
332742	2009 TL_{10}	—	October 9, 2009	Catalina	CSS	·	1.1 km	MPC · JPL
332743	2009 TY_{13}	—	October 10, 2009	La Sagra	OAM	MAS	780 m	MPC · JPL
332744	2009 TV_{14}	—	October 14, 2009	La Sagra	OAM	·	1.9 km	MPC · JPL
332745	2009 TZ_{19}	—	October 11, 2009	Mount Lemmon	Mount Lemmon Survey	·	1.3 km	MPC · JPL
332746	2009 TW_{20}	—	October 11, 2009	La Sagra	OAM	·	1.2 km	MPC · JPL
332747	2009 TM_{23}	—	October 14, 2009	La Sagra	OAM	·	1.9 km	MPC · JPL
332748	2009 TF_{27}	—	October 14, 2009	La Sagra	OAM	·	2.6 km	MPC · JPL
332749	2009 TN_{27}	—	December 15, 2006	Mount Lemmon	Mount Lemmon Survey	·	1.2 km	MPC · JPL
332750	2009 TY_{27}	—	October 15, 2009	La Sagra	OAM	GEF	2.1 km	MPC · JPL
332751	2009 TV_{46}	—	October 12, 2009	La Sagra	OAM	·	1.3 km	MPC · JPL
332752	2009 TO_{47}	—	October 15, 2009	Kitt Peak	Spacewatch	·	3.1 km	MPC · JPL
332753	2009 TT_{47}	—	October 2, 2009	Mount Lemmon	Mount Lemmon Survey	·	2.0 km	MPC · JPL
332754	2009 UY_{8}	—	October 16, 2009	Mount Lemmon	Mount Lemmon Survey	·	1.1 km	MPC · JPL
332755	2009 UO_{17}	—	October 20, 2009	Bisei SG Center	BATTeRS	·	2.9 km	MPC · JPL
332756	2009 UW_{37}	—	October 22, 2009	Mount Lemmon	Mount Lemmon Survey	·	2.0 km	MPC · JPL
332757	2009 UN_{46}	—	October 18, 2009	Mount Lemmon	Mount Lemmon Survey	MAR	1.2 km	MPC · JPL
332758	2009 UM_{70}	—	October 25, 2005	Kitt Peak	Spacewatch	·	1.7 km	MPC · JPL
332759	2009 UB_{77}	—	October 21, 2009	Mount Lemmon	Mount Lemmon Survey	·	1.5 km	MPC · JPL
332760	2009 UQ_{81}	—	January 12, 2005	Uccle	T. Pauwels	·	3.4 km	MPC · JPL
332761	2009 UK_{84}	—	October 23, 2009	Mount Lemmon	Mount Lemmon Survey	KOR	1.3 km	MPC · JPL
332762	2009 US_{84}	—	October 23, 2009	Mount Lemmon	Mount Lemmon Survey	·	1.5 km	MPC · JPL
332763	2009 UY_{84}	—	October 23, 2009	Mount Lemmon	Mount Lemmon Survey	KOR	1.5 km	MPC · JPL
332764	2009 UQ_{86}	—	October 24, 2009	Catalina	CSS	·	1.8 km	MPC · JPL
332765	2009 UR_{91}	—	October 18, 2009	Catalina	CSS	·	3.9 km	MPC · JPL
332766	2009 UW_{102}	—	October 24, 2009	Catalina	CSS	·	5.3 km	MPC · JPL
332767	2009 UB_{112}	—	October 24, 2009	Kitt Peak	Spacewatch	HOF	3.2 km	MPC · JPL
332768	2009 UJ_{136}	—	October 21, 2009	Catalina	CSS	·	980 m	MPC · JPL
332769	2009 UV_{137}	—	October 22, 2009	Catalina	CSS	·	2.4 km	MPC · JPL
332770	2009 UQ_{140}	—	October 26, 2009	Kitt Peak	Spacewatch	·	2.3 km	MPC · JPL
332771	2009 UG_{148}	—	October 21, 2009	Mount Lemmon	Mount Lemmon Survey	AGN	1.4 km	MPC · JPL
332772	2009 VM	—	February 23, 2007	Kitt Peak	Spacewatch	WIT	1.2 km	MPC · JPL
332773	2009 VQ_{12}	—	November 8, 2009	Mount Lemmon	Mount Lemmon Survey	(12739)	1.6 km	MPC · JPL
332774	2009 VM_{21}	—	February 21, 2007	Mount Lemmon	Mount Lemmon Survey	·	1.4 km	MPC · JPL
332775	2009 VO_{24}	—	November 11, 2009	Catalina	CSS	APO	470 m	MPC · JPL
332776	2009 VY_{30}	—	November 9, 2009	Mount Lemmon	Mount Lemmon Survey	EOS	2.1 km	MPC · JPL
332777	2009 VU_{32}	—	November 9, 2009	Mount Lemmon	Mount Lemmon Survey	EOS	3.1 km	MPC · JPL
332778	2009 VK_{37}	—	November 8, 2009	Kitt Peak	Spacewatch	BRA	1.8 km	MPC · JPL
332779	2009 VX_{37}	—	November 8, 2009	Kitt Peak	Spacewatch	·	1.9 km	MPC · JPL
332780	2009 VZ_{37}	—	November 8, 2009	Kitt Peak	Spacewatch	·	4.9 km	MPC · JPL
332781	2009 VF_{45}	—	November 11, 2009	Socorro	LINEAR	·	2.9 km	MPC · JPL
332782	2009 VT_{47}	—	November 9, 2009	Mount Lemmon	Mount Lemmon Survey	·	1.4 km	MPC · JPL
332783	2009 VC_{52}	—	November 10, 2009	Kitt Peak	Spacewatch	NYS	1.8 km	MPC · JPL
332784	2009 VR_{62}	—	November 8, 2009	Kitt Peak	Spacewatch	MAS	830 m	MPC · JPL
332785	2009 VG_{68}	—	November 9, 2009	Kitt Peak	Spacewatch	·	1.7 km	MPC · JPL
332786	2009 VA_{77}	—	October 15, 2009	La Sagra	OAM	·	5.2 km	MPC · JPL
332787	2009 VS_{78}	—	November 9, 2009	Catalina	CSS	MAR	1.8 km	MPC · JPL
332788	2009 VC_{81}	—	November 14, 2009	La Sagra	OAM	·	5.1 km	MPC · JPL
332789	2009 VT_{104}	—	November 8, 2009	Catalina	CSS	·	1.9 km	MPC · JPL
332790	2009 WM_{2}	—	February 14, 2002	Kitt Peak	Spacewatch	·	1.7 km	MPC · JPL
332791	2009 WJ_{9}	—	November 18, 2009	Socorro	LINEAR	·	2.3 km	MPC · JPL
332792	2009 WO_{22}	—	November 18, 2009	Kitt Peak	Spacewatch	·	1.6 km	MPC · JPL
332793	2009 WB_{28}	—	November 16, 2009	Kitt Peak	Spacewatch	·	3.2 km	MPC · JPL
332794	2009 WB_{38}	—	November 17, 2009	Kitt Peak	Spacewatch	·	1.6 km	MPC · JPL
332795	2009 WW_{41}	—	November 17, 2009	Mount Lemmon	Mount Lemmon Survey	(5)	1.6 km	MPC · JPL
332796	2009 WD_{64}	—	November 16, 2009	Mount Lemmon	Mount Lemmon Survey	·	3.0 km	MPC · JPL
332797	2009 WH_{64}	—	November 16, 2009	Mount Lemmon	Mount Lemmon Survey	HOF	2.6 km	MPC · JPL
332798	2009 WR_{66}	—	April 14, 2007	Mount Lemmon	Mount Lemmon Survey	·	1.8 km	MPC · JPL
332799	2009 WX_{70}	—	November 18, 2009	Kitt Peak	Spacewatch	·	2.9 km	MPC · JPL
332800	2009 WU_{73}	—	December 3, 2004	Kitt Peak	Spacewatch	·	2.5 km	MPC · JPL

== 332801–332900 ==
back to top

Designation			Discovery			Properties		Ref
Permanent	Provisional	Named after	Date	Site	Discoverer(s)	Category	Diam.	Ref
332801	2009 WF_{74}	—	November 10, 2009	Kitt Peak	Spacewatch	·	2.3 km	MPC · JPL
332802	2009 WD_{75}	—	November 18, 2009	Kitt Peak	Spacewatch	MRX	1.2 km	MPC · JPL
332803	2009 WP_{88}	—	November 19, 2009	Kitt Peak	Spacewatch	EOS	2.5 km	MPC · JPL
332804	2009 WP_{89}	—	November 19, 2009	Kitt Peak	Spacewatch	·	1.6 km	MPC · JPL
332805	2009 WO_{133}	—	November 10, 2009	Kitt Peak	Spacewatch	·	4.1 km	MPC · JPL
332806	2009 WQ_{150}	—	November 19, 2009	Mount Lemmon	Mount Lemmon Survey	·	3.0 km	MPC · JPL
332807	2009 WT_{156}	—	November 20, 2009	Mount Lemmon	Mount Lemmon Survey	·	2.1 km	MPC · JPL
332808	2009 WD_{162}	—	November 8, 2009	Mount Lemmon	Mount Lemmon Survey	·	3.4 km	MPC · JPL
332809	2009 WR_{166}	—	November 21, 2009	Mount Lemmon	Mount Lemmon Survey	EOS	2.5 km	MPC · JPL
332810	2009 WS_{167}	—	January 23, 2006	Kitt Peak	Spacewatch	·	2.0 km	MPC · JPL
332811	2009 WR_{171}	—	November 22, 2009	Mount Lemmon	Mount Lemmon Survey	·	1.3 km	MPC · JPL
332812	2009 WQ_{181}	—	November 23, 2009	Mount Lemmon	Mount Lemmon Survey	KON	3.3 km	MPC · JPL
332813	2009 WX_{187}	—	March 16, 2007	Catalina	CSS	·	3.1 km	MPC · JPL
332814	2009 WE_{195}	—	November 25, 2009	La Sagra	OAM	EOS	3.0 km	MPC · JPL
332815	2009 WV_{211}	—	October 25, 2003	Kitt Peak	Spacewatch	·	5.4 km	MPC · JPL
332816	2009 WN_{228}	—	March 15, 2007	Mount Lemmon	Mount Lemmon Survey	·	2.6 km	MPC · JPL
332817	2009 WC_{240}	—	September 9, 2002	Haleakala	NEAT	·	1.0 km	MPC · JPL
332818	2009 WP_{250}	—	November 23, 2009	Kitt Peak	Spacewatch	MAR	1.6 km	MPC · JPL
332819	2009 WQ_{252}	—	November 8, 2009	Mount Lemmon	Mount Lemmon Survey	·	4.9 km	MPC · JPL
332820	2009 WQ_{257}	—	November 11, 2004	Kitt Peak	Spacewatch	·	2.3 km	MPC · JPL
332821	2009 WU_{261}	—	November 16, 2009	Mount Lemmon	Mount Lemmon Survey	·	3.4 km	MPC · JPL
332822	2009 WW_{261}	—	November 17, 2009	Kitt Peak	Spacewatch	·	4.6 km	MPC · JPL
332823	2009 WP_{263}	—	November 21, 2009	Kitt Peak	Spacewatch	·	4.0 km	MPC · JPL
332824	2009 XO_{16}	—	December 15, 2009	Mount Lemmon	Mount Lemmon Survey	·	2.5 km	MPC · JPL
332825	2009 XZ_{16}	—	December 15, 2009	Mount Lemmon	Mount Lemmon Survey	·	4.6 km	MPC · JPL
332826	2009 XG_{18}	—	December 15, 2009	Mount Lemmon	Mount Lemmon Survey	·	2.1 km	MPC · JPL
332827	2009 YB_{15}	—	December 18, 2009	Mount Lemmon	Mount Lemmon Survey	LUT	5.0 km	MPC · JPL
332828	2009 YN_{16}	—	December 19, 2009	Kitt Peak	Spacewatch	·	4.6 km	MPC · JPL
332829	2010 AU_{1}	—	January 5, 2010	Kitt Peak	Spacewatch	·	5.8 km	MPC · JPL
332830	2010 AA_{9}	—	January 6, 2010	Kitt Peak	Spacewatch	·	4.2 km	MPC · JPL
332831	2010 AD_{18}	—	November 24, 2003	Kitt Peak	Spacewatch	·	4.3 km	MPC · JPL
332832	2010 AT_{31}	—	January 6, 2010	Kitt Peak	Spacewatch	·	5.3 km	MPC · JPL
332833	2010 AG_{43}	—	November 26, 2003	Kitt Peak	Spacewatch	EOS	2.4 km	MPC · JPL
332834	2010 AP_{60}	—	January 13, 2010	Kachina	Hobart, J.	·	2.9 km	MPC · JPL
332835	2010 AJ_{65}	—	January 11, 2010	Kitt Peak	Spacewatch	·	5.7 km	MPC · JPL
332836	2010 AT_{69}	—	December 8, 2004	Socorro	LINEAR	·	3.2 km	MPC · JPL
332837	2010 AY_{74}	—	January 6, 2010	Socorro	LINEAR	EUN	1.6 km	MPC · JPL
332838	2010 AE_{79}	—	January 13, 2010	Desert Moon	Stevens, B. L.	·	3.5 km	MPC · JPL
332839	2010 CP_{55}	—	February 12, 2010	Socorro	LINEAR	·	5.5 km	MPC · JPL
332840	2010 DZ_{59}	—	February 25, 2010	WISE	WISE	·	3.4 km	MPC · JPL
332841	2010 EA_{6}	—	March 2, 2010	WISE	WISE	slow	3.3 km	MPC · JPL
332842	2010 EP_{12}	—	October 23, 2008	Kitt Peak	Spacewatch	·	1.3 km	MPC · JPL
332843	2010 EP_{21}	—	February 12, 2004	Kitt Peak	Spacewatch	·	3.8 km	MPC · JPL
332844	2010 EW_{87}	—	March 13, 2010	La Sagra	OAM	·	1.8 km	MPC · JPL
332845	2010 EP_{112}	—	March 19, 2001	Kitt Peak	Spacewatch	·	1.6 km	MPC · JPL
332846	2010 EW_{139}	—	December 12, 2004	Kitt Peak	Spacewatch	·	1.7 km	MPC · JPL
332847	2010 FA_{30}	—	December 20, 2004	Mount Lemmon	Mount Lemmon Survey	·	2.4 km	MPC · JPL
332848	2010 GC_{97}	—	September 18, 2007	Anderson Mesa	LONEOS	V	910 m	MPC · JPL
332849	2010 HS_{56}	—	June 23, 2002	La Palma	S. Collander-Brown, A. Fitzsimmons	·	4.0 km	MPC · JPL
332850	2010 JK_{119}	—	April 6, 2005	Kitt Peak	Spacewatch	GEF	1.3 km	MPC · JPL
332851	2010 MO_{59}	—	January 13, 2005	Kitt Peak	Spacewatch	·	2.8 km	MPC · JPL
332852	2010 RZ_{3}	—	September 1, 2010	Bergisch Gladbach	W. Bickel	·	1.4 km	MPC · JPL
332853	2010 RL_{44}	—	December 17, 2003	Kitt Peak	Spacewatch	·	1.6 km	MPC · JPL
332854	2010 RN_{71}	—	March 8, 2005	Mount Lemmon	Mount Lemmon Survey	·	870 m	MPC · JPL
332855	2010 RX_{99}	—	May 4, 2005	Mauna Kea	Veillet, C.	·	900 m	MPC · JPL
332856	2010 SM_{34}	—	February 3, 2009	Mount Lemmon	Mount Lemmon Survey	·	730 m	MPC · JPL
332857	2010 TJ_{169}	—	September 24, 2003	Palomar	NEAT	·	1.2 km	MPC · JPL
332858	2010 TX_{176}	—	September 28, 2006	Catalina	CSS	·	1.9 km	MPC · JPL
332859	2010 UT_{24}	—	March 18, 2004	Kitt Peak	Spacewatch	(5)	1.8 km	MPC · JPL
332860	2010 VY_{25}	—	December 17, 2007	Mount Lemmon	Mount Lemmon Survey	·	770 m	MPC · JPL
332861	2010 VU_{90}	—	February 16, 2007	Catalina	CSS	·	2.2 km	MPC · JPL
332862	2010 VS_{103}	—	November 29, 2003	Kitt Peak	Spacewatch	·	850 m	MPC · JPL
332863	2010 VE_{178}	—	October 14, 2010	Mount Lemmon	Mount Lemmon Survey	·	1.7 km	MPC · JPL
332864	2010 VK_{181}	—	November 11, 2010	Mount Lemmon	Mount Lemmon Survey	·	1.5 km	MPC · JPL
332865	2010 VP_{191}	—	October 4, 2002	Apache Point	SDSS	·	1.7 km	MPC · JPL
332866	2010 WG_{14}	—	February 7, 1999	Kitt Peak	Spacewatch	·	1.1 km	MPC · JPL
332867	2010 WE_{17}	—	September 22, 2003	Kitt Peak	Spacewatch	·	800 m	MPC · JPL
332868	2010 WM_{47}	—	November 19, 2003	Kitt Peak	Spacewatch	(2076)	720 m	MPC · JPL
332869	2010 WN_{58}	—	September 28, 2006	Kitt Peak	Spacewatch	·	1.2 km	MPC · JPL
332870	2010 XP_{1}	—	November 8, 2010	Mount Lemmon	Mount Lemmon Survey	·	1.5 km	MPC · JPL
332871	2010 XX_{16}	—	November 27, 2000	Socorro	LINEAR	·	780 m	MPC · JPL
332872	2010 XX_{44}	—	January 26, 2006	Catalina	CSS	·	2.1 km	MPC · JPL
332873	2010 XG_{77}	—	October 2, 2006	Mount Lemmon	Mount Lemmon Survey	·	1.2 km	MPC · JPL
332874	2010 XN_{86}	—	November 26, 2003	Kitt Peak	Spacewatch	·	990 m	MPC · JPL
332875	2011 AC_{1}	—	December 7, 2005	Catalina	CSS	·	2.6 km	MPC · JPL
332876	2011 AQ_{6}	—	February 22, 2007	Kitt Peak	Spacewatch	MIS	2.6 km	MPC · JPL
332877	2011 AL_{11}	—	September 17, 2004	Anderson Mesa	LONEOS	H	1.0 km	MPC · JPL
332878	2011 AQ_{27}	—	August 30, 2005	Palomar	NEAT	·	1.8 km	MPC · JPL
332879	2011 AU_{27}	—	December 27, 2006	Mount Lemmon	Mount Lemmon Survey	(5)	1.2 km	MPC · JPL
332880	2011 AL_{38}	—	November 17, 2006	Mount Lemmon	Mount Lemmon Survey	·	1.2 km	MPC · JPL
332881	2011 AQ_{41}	—	October 26, 2005	Kitt Peak	Spacewatch	·	1.6 km	MPC · JPL
332882	2011 AK_{48}	—	January 17, 2007	Kitt Peak	Spacewatch	MAR	1.2 km	MPC · JPL
332883	2011 AA_{49}	—	January 12, 2011	Mount Lemmon	Mount Lemmon Survey	(32418)	2.8 km	MPC · JPL
332884 Arianagrande	2011 AG_{53}	Arianagrande	March 9, 2007	Catalina	CSS	·	1.9 km	MPC · JPL
332885	2011 AN_{53}	—	December 1, 2005	Kitt Peak	Spacewatch	NEM	2.7 km	MPC · JPL
332886	2011 AH_{54}	—	February 9, 2008	Mount Lemmon	Mount Lemmon Survey	·	820 m	MPC · JPL
332887	2011 AJ_{55}	—	March 15, 2007	Bergisch Gladbach	W. Bickel	AEO	1.1 km	MPC · JPL
332888	2011 AW_{61}	—	February 26, 2007	Mount Lemmon	Mount Lemmon Survey	·	1.9 km	MPC · JPL
332889	2011 AH_{74}	—	September 16, 2009	Catalina	CSS	EOS	2.5 km	MPC · JPL
332890	2011 AT_{76}	—	June 3, 2008	Mount Lemmon	Mount Lemmon Survey	·	2.6 km	MPC · JPL
332891	2011 AU_{77}	—	March 20, 1999	Apache Point	SDSS	(5)	1.4 km	MPC · JPL
332892	2011 BC_{11}	—	August 5, 2005	Palomar	NEAT	·	1.8 km	MPC · JPL
332893	2011 BP_{12}	—	April 2, 2006	Anderson Mesa	LONEOS	·	3.2 km	MPC · JPL
332894	2011 BQ_{12}	—	March 10, 2002	Haleakala	NEAT	·	3.0 km	MPC · JPL
332895	2011 BH_{13}	—	January 8, 2011	Mount Lemmon	Mount Lemmon Survey	·	1.4 km	MPC · JPL
332896	2011 BW_{13}	—	March 20, 2007	Catalina	CSS	·	3.0 km	MPC · JPL
332897	2011 BB_{25}	—	January 24, 2007	Bergisch Gladbach	W. Bickel	·	1.5 km	MPC · JPL
332898	2011 BM_{36}	—	February 27, 2007	Kitt Peak	Spacewatch	·	1.4 km	MPC · JPL
332899	2011 BQ_{38}	—	October 2, 2009	Mount Lemmon	Mount Lemmon Survey	·	2.5 km	MPC · JPL
332900	2011 BU_{44}	—	December 25, 2005	Mount Lemmon	Mount Lemmon Survey	·	1.9 km	MPC · JPL

== 332901–333000 ==
back to top

Designation			Discovery			Properties		Ref
Permanent	Provisional	Named after	Date	Site	Discoverer(s)	Category	Diam.	Ref
332901	2011 BA_{51}	—	February 22, 2006	Catalina	CSS	EOS	2.4 km	MPC · JPL
332902	2011 BS_{54}	—	March 26, 2003	Palomar	NEAT	EUN	1.5 km	MPC · JPL
332903	2011 BA_{55}	—	November 1, 2005	Palomar	NEAT	·	1.9 km	MPC · JPL
332904	2011 BD_{56}	—	March 26, 2003	Palomar	NEAT	·	2.0 km	MPC · JPL
332905	2011 BQ_{63}	—	December 14, 2010	Mount Lemmon	Mount Lemmon Survey	·	1.8 km	MPC · JPL
332906	2011 BM_{75}	—	February 22, 2004	Kitt Peak	Spacewatch	·	2.9 km	MPC · JPL
332907	2011 BP_{78}	—	May 17, 2004	Reedy Creek	J. Broughton	·	1.4 km	MPC · JPL
332908	2011 BR_{79}	—	March 16, 2004	Kitt Peak	Spacewatch	MAS	740 m	MPC · JPL
332909	2011 BU_{84}	—	September 18, 1995	Kitt Peak	Spacewatch	EUN	1.5 km	MPC · JPL
332910	2011 BA_{93}	—	September 22, 2009	Catalina	CSS	·	1.8 km	MPC · JPL
332911	2011 BD_{101}	—	October 29, 2003	Kitt Peak	Spacewatch	·	930 m	MPC · JPL
332912	2011 BO_{103}	—	September 20, 2008	Mount Lemmon	Mount Lemmon Survey	·	2.7 km	MPC · JPL
332913	2011 BX_{103}	—	March 2, 2006	Kitt Peak	Spacewatch	·	2.5 km	MPC · JPL
332914	2011 BR_{104}	—	September 2, 2000	Anderson Mesa	LONEOS	EUN	1.3 km	MPC · JPL
332915	2011 BE_{112}	—	March 26, 2006	Kitt Peak	Spacewatch	·	2.4 km	MPC · JPL
332916	2011 BA_{113}	—	September 17, 2004	Kitt Peak	Spacewatch	·	1.5 km	MPC · JPL
332917	2011 BB_{116}	—	December 25, 2005	Kitt Peak	Spacewatch	·	2.6 km	MPC · JPL
332918	2011 CH_{1}	—	December 18, 2004	Kitt Peak	Spacewatch	·	3.7 km	MPC · JPL
332919	2011 CY_{1}	—	September 16, 2009	Catalina	CSS	·	3.5 km	MPC · JPL
332920	2011 CW_{5}	—	March 31, 2008	Mount Lemmon	Mount Lemmon Survey	V	670 m	MPC · JPL
332921	2011 CE_{9}	—	November 19, 2006	Kitt Peak	Spacewatch	·	1.5 km	MPC · JPL
332922	2011 CN_{17}	—	January 7, 2006	Kitt Peak	Spacewatch	LUT	5.9 km	MPC · JPL
332923	2011 CH_{20}	—	October 12, 2009	Mount Lemmon	Mount Lemmon Survey	NEM	2.9 km	MPC · JPL
332924	2011 CT_{26}	—	March 25, 2006	Kitt Peak	Spacewatch	·	2.9 km	MPC · JPL
332925	2011 CV_{33}	—	December 27, 2006	Mount Lemmon	Mount Lemmon Survey	EUN	1.4 km	MPC · JPL
332926	2011 CT_{42}	—	January 26, 2006	Anderson Mesa	LONEOS	·	2.3 km	MPC · JPL
332927	2011 CA_{48}	—	December 3, 2004	Kitt Peak	Spacewatch	HYG	3.1 km	MPC · JPL
332928	2011 CN_{50}	—	March 19, 2007	Siding Spring	SSS	·	2.7 km	MPC · JPL
332929	2011 CV_{59}	—	February 17, 2007	Kitt Peak	Spacewatch	·	1.7 km	MPC · JPL
332930	2011 CV_{60}	—	March 11, 2007	Kitt Peak	Spacewatch	·	2.3 km	MPC · JPL
332931	2011 CB_{72}	—	September 19, 1998	Apache Point	SDSS	EOS	2.6 km	MPC · JPL
332932	2011 CD_{72}	—	March 6, 2006	Mount Lemmon	Mount Lemmon Survey	TIR	3.2 km	MPC · JPL
332933	2011 CB_{73}	—	February 28, 2006	Catalina	CSS	EOS	2.6 km	MPC · JPL
332934	2011 CP_{75}	—	December 18, 2009	Mount Lemmon	Mount Lemmon Survey	·	4.4 km	MPC · JPL
332935	2011 CA_{79}	—	March 14, 2007	Kitt Peak	Spacewatch	AGN	1.2 km	MPC · JPL
332936	2011 CT_{85}	—	March 23, 2001	Anderson Mesa	LONEOS	·	2.8 km	MPC · JPL
332937	2011 CB_{87}	—	March 26, 2006	Kitt Peak	Spacewatch	·	3.1 km	MPC · JPL
332938	2011 CK_{90}	—	October 24, 2005	Mauna Kea	A. Boattini	KOR	1.4 km	MPC · JPL
332939	2011 CY_{92}	—	March 13, 2007	Kitt Peak	Spacewatch	·	1.8 km	MPC · JPL
332940	2011 CH_{105}	—	February 1, 2006	Mount Lemmon	Mount Lemmon Survey	AGN	1.3 km	MPC · JPL
332941	2011 DZ_{7}	—	September 29, 2003	Kitt Peak	Spacewatch	·	2.6 km	MPC · JPL
332942	2011 DO_{10}	—	February 2, 2005	Kitt Peak	Spacewatch	·	4.1 km	MPC · JPL
332943	2011 DJ_{13}	—	March 10, 2007	Mount Lemmon	Mount Lemmon Survey	·	2.0 km	MPC · JPL
332944	2011 DK_{24}	—	November 30, 2005	Kitt Peak	Spacewatch	·	2.1 km	MPC · JPL
332945	2011 DM_{28}	—	August 15, 2009	Kitt Peak	Spacewatch	V	750 m	MPC · JPL
332946	2011 DY_{29}	—	December 26, 2006	Kitt Peak	Spacewatch	·	2.7 km	MPC · JPL
332947	2011 DZ_{32}	—	February 7, 2006	Mount Lemmon	Mount Lemmon Survey	·	2.4 km	MPC · JPL
332948	2011 DV_{36}	—	March 3, 2006	Kitt Peak	Spacewatch	·	1.8 km	MPC · JPL
332949	2011 DP_{42}	—	June 16, 2006	Kitt Peak	Spacewatch	·	4.5 km	MPC · JPL
332950	2011 DE_{43}	—	September 28, 2003	Kitt Peak	Spacewatch	·	2.7 km	MPC · JPL
332951	2011 DU_{43}	—	August 5, 2008	La Sagra	OAM	·	2.3 km	MPC · JPL
332952	2011 DR_{50}	—	April 23, 2007	Mount Lemmon	Mount Lemmon Survey	·	2.2 km	MPC · JPL
332953	2011 DF_{51}	—	March 23, 2006	Catalina	CSS	·	4.0 km	MPC · JPL
332954	2011 EA_{4}	—	February 14, 2005	Kitt Peak	Spacewatch	·	3.3 km	MPC · JPL
332955	2011 ET_{5}	—	March 26, 2007	Kitt Peak	Spacewatch	·	1.8 km	MPC · JPL
332956	2011 EO_{9}	—	September 23, 2008	Kitt Peak	Spacewatch	·	3.5 km	MPC · JPL
332957	2011 EA_{10}	—	December 27, 2006	Mount Lemmon	Mount Lemmon Survey	·	2.0 km	MPC · JPL
332958	2011 EX_{10}	—	July 20, 2002	Palomar	NEAT	·	5.5 km	MPC · JPL
332959	2011 EV_{15}	—	March 5, 2006	Catalina	CSS	·	4.3 km	MPC · JPL
332960	2011 EZ_{15}	—	November 6, 2002	Anderson Mesa	LONEOS	·	1.5 km	MPC · JPL
332961	2011 EM_{28}	—	April 4, 2006	Lulin	LUSS	EOS	2.2 km	MPC · JPL
332962	2011 EA_{40}	—	April 2, 1995	Kitt Peak	Spacewatch	·	2.5 km	MPC · JPL
332963	2011 ED_{42}	—	June 18, 2007	Kitt Peak	Spacewatch	·	3.6 km	MPC · JPL
332964	2011 EH_{53}	—	October 9, 2008	Catalina	CSS	·	3.9 km	MPC · JPL
332965	2011 EQ_{59}	—	May 7, 2006	Mount Lemmon	Mount Lemmon Survey	·	3.2 km	MPC · JPL
332966	2011 EX_{73}	—	November 16, 2003	Kitt Peak	Spacewatch	·	4.0 km	MPC · JPL
332967	2011 EV_{74}	—	September 26, 2008	Kitt Peak	Spacewatch	·	3.4 km	MPC · JPL
332968	2011 EM_{75}	—	March 31, 2003	Anderson Mesa	LONEOS	·	1.4 km	MPC · JPL
332969	2011 EZ_{80}	—	August 31, 2002	Kitt Peak	Spacewatch	VER	3.4 km	MPC · JPL
332970	2011 ER_{81}	—	October 10, 2002	Apache Point	SDSS	·	3.2 km	MPC · JPL
332971	2011 EH_{84}	—	May 20, 2006	Kitt Peak	Spacewatch	·	2.7 km	MPC · JPL
332972	2011 FY_{1}	—	March 10, 2002	Palomar	NEAT	·	3.2 km	MPC · JPL
332973	2011 FG_{3}	—	January 26, 2006	Kitt Peak	Spacewatch	BRA	1.8 km	MPC · JPL
332974	2011 FK_{3}	—	March 2, 2001	Anderson Mesa	LONEOS	·	900 m	MPC · JPL
332975	2011 FR_{4}	—	April 2, 2006	Kitt Peak	Spacewatch	·	3.8 km	MPC · JPL
332976	2011 FG_{6}	—	March 9, 2005	Catalina	CSS	·	4.8 km	MPC · JPL
332977	2011 FL_{9}	—	September 13, 2007	Mount Lemmon	Mount Lemmon Survey	·	3.3 km	MPC · JPL
332978	2011 FR_{10}	—	January 28, 2006	Kitt Peak	Spacewatch	·	3.2 km	MPC · JPL
332979	2011 FE_{17}	—	October 5, 2003	Kitt Peak	Spacewatch	TIR	3.5 km	MPC · JPL
332980	2011 FJ_{29}	—	October 15, 2002	Palomar	NEAT	·	5.7 km	MPC · JPL
332981	2011 FY_{36}	—	March 8, 2005	Mount Lemmon	Mount Lemmon Survey	·	3.0 km	MPC · JPL
332982	2011 FM_{43}	—	September 11, 2002	Palomar	NEAT	·	3.7 km	MPC · JPL
332983	2011 FZ_{45}	—	September 19, 1998	Apache Point	SDSS	KOR	1.9 km	MPC · JPL
332984	2011 FG_{67}	—	October 6, 2008	Mount Lemmon	Mount Lemmon Survey	fast?	4.4 km	MPC · JPL
332985	2011 FJ_{68}	—	October 29, 2003	Kitt Peak	Spacewatch	·	2.7 km	MPC · JPL
332986	2011 FY_{75}	—	October 20, 2003	Kitt Peak	Spacewatch	EOS	2.0 km	MPC · JPL
332987	2011 FZ_{75}	—	August 22, 2003	Palomar	NEAT	·	2.9 km	MPC · JPL
332988	2011 FR_{89}	—	August 17, 2002	Haleakala	NEAT	·	4.3 km	MPC · JPL
332989	2011 FP_{127}	—	November 19, 2003	Kitt Peak	Spacewatch	·	4.5 km	MPC · JPL
332990	2011 FQ_{128}	—	April 14, 2004	Kitt Peak	Spacewatch	MAS	750 m	MPC · JPL
332991 Tammybecker	2011 FX_{147}	Tammybecker	January 28, 2006	Mount Lemmon	Mount Lemmon Survey	·	2.2 km	MPC · JPL
332992	2011 FK_{154}	—	March 17, 2005	Kitt Peak	Spacewatch	·	3.3 km	MPC · JPL
332993	2011 GK_{9}	—	October 24, 2005	Mauna Kea	A. Boattini	·	2.7 km	MPC · JPL
332994	2011 GE_{37}	—	March 10, 2005	Anderson Mesa	LONEOS	·	5.4 km	MPC · JPL
332995	2011 GM_{63}	—	May 28, 2000	Socorro	LINEAR	URS	5.0 km	MPC · JPL
332996	2011 GX_{64}	—	December 20, 2009	Kitt Peak	Spacewatch	VER	2.5 km	MPC · JPL
332997	2011 GF_{66}	—	November 19, 2003	Kitt Peak	Spacewatch	·	4.1 km	MPC · JPL
332998	2011 GA_{67}	—	January 8, 2010	Kitt Peak	Spacewatch	URS	4.8 km	MPC · JPL
332999	2011 HV_{4}	—	December 16, 2003	Kitt Peak	Spacewatch	EOS	2.3 km	MPC · JPL
333000	2011 HL_{37}	—	August 5, 2002	Palomar	NEAT	·	2.5 km	MPC · JPL

back to top

== See also ==
- Meanings of minor-planet names: 332001–333000
