= Meanings of minor-planet names: 320001–321000 =

As minor planet discoveries are confirmed, they are given a permanent number by the IAU's Minor Planet Center (MPC), and the discoverers can then submit names for them, following the IAU's naming conventions. The list below concerns those minor planets in the specified number-range that have received names, and explains the meanings of those names.

Official naming citations of newly named small Solar System bodies are approved and published in a bulletin by IAU's Working Group for Small Bodies Nomenclature (WGSBN). Before May 2021, citations were published in MPC's Minor Planet Circulars for many decades. Recent citations can also be found on the JPL Small-Body Database (SBDB). Until his death in 2016, German astronomer Lutz D. Schmadel compiled these citations into the Dictionary of Minor Planet Names (DMP) and regularly updated the collection.

Based on Paul Herget's The Names of the Minor Planets, Schmadel also researched the unclear origin of numerous asteroids, most of which had been named prior to World War II. This article incorporates text from this source, which is in the public domain: SBDB New namings may only be added to this list below after official publication as the preannouncement of names is condemned. The WGSBN publishes a comprehensive guideline for the naming rules of non-cometary small Solar System bodies.

== 320001–320100 ==
Named minor planet	Provisional	This minor planet was named for...	Ref · Catalog
320065 Erbaghjolu	2007 EW_{38}	Erbaghjolu is a commune in the Haute-Corse department of France on the island of Corsica. South of this village, 750 meters above sea level, is the Stelle di Corsica astronomical observatory.	IAU · 320065

== 320101–320200 ==
back to top

Named minor planet	Provisional	This minor planet was named for...	Ref · Catalog
320153 Eglītis	2007 FU_{20}	Ilgmārs Eglītis (born 1951) was the head of the Baldone Observatory and director of the Institute of Astronomy of University of Latvia.	JPL · 320153

== 320201–320300 ==
back to top

Named minor planet	Provisional	This minor planet was named for...	Ref · Catalog
320260 Bertout	2007 QA_{5}	Claude Bertout (born 1946), a French astronomer who made significant contributions to the field of star formation and was a long-time editor in chief of Astronomy & Astrophysics.	JPL · 320260

== 320301–320400 ==
back to top

Named minor planet	Provisional	This minor planet was named for...	Ref · Catalog
There are no named minor planets in this number range

== 320401–320500 ==
back to top

Named minor planet	Provisional	This minor planet was named for...	Ref · Catalog
There are no named minor planets in this number range

== 320501–320600 ==
back to top

Named minor planet	Provisional	This minor planet was named for...	Ref · Catalog
320541 Asiaa	2008 AD_{3}	Academia Sinica Institute of Astronomy and Astrophysics (ASIAA).	IAU · 320541

== 320601–320700 ==
back to top

Named minor planet	Provisional	This minor planet was named for...	Ref · Catalog
There are no named minor planets in this number range

== 320701–320800 ==
back to top

Named minor planet	Provisional	This minor planet was named for...	Ref · Catalog
320790 Anestin	2008 EN_{145}	Victor Anestin (1875–1918), a Romanian journalist who popularized astronomy and sciences.	JPL · 320790

== 320801–320900 ==
back to top

Named minor planet	Provisional	This minor planet was named for...	Ref · Catalog
320880 Cabu	2008 GV_{21}	Jean Cabut (Cabu, 1938–2015), a French comic strip artist and caricaturist. JPL	MPC · 320880

== 320901–321000 ==
back to top

Named minor planet	Provisional	This minor planet was named for...	Ref · Catalog
320942 Jeanette-Jesse	2008 GC_{145}	Jeanette (1916–2014) and Jesse (1916–2014) Wasserman, parents of American discoverer Lawrence H. Wasserman	JPL · 320942

back to top

Preceded by 319,001–320,000	Meanings of minor-planet names List of minor planets: 320,001–321,000	Succeeded by 321,001–322,000
