= List of minor planets: 320001–321000 =

The following is a partial list of minor planets, running from minor-planet number 320001 through 321000, inclusive. The primary data for this and other partial lists is based on JPL's "Small-Body Orbital Elements" and data available from the Minor Planet Center. Critical list information is also provided by the MPC, unless otherwise specified from Lowell Observatory. A detailed description of the table's columns and additional sources are given on the main page including a complete list of every page in this series, and a statistical break-up on the dynamical classification of minor planets.

Also see the summary list of all named bodies in numerical and alphabetical order, and the corresponding naming citations for the number range of this particular list. New namings may only be added to this list after official publication, as the preannouncement of names is condemned by the Working Group for Small Bodies Nomenclature of the International Astronomical Union.

Near-Earth obj.	MBA (inner)	MBA (outer)	Centaur
Mars-crosser	MBA (middle)	Jupiter trojan	Trans-Neptunian obj.
Unclassified

== 320001–320100 ==
Designation			Discovery			Properties		Ref
Permanent	Provisional	Named after	Date	Site	Discoverer(s)	Category	Diam.	Ref
320001	2007 DW_{27}	—	February 17, 2007	Kitt Peak	Spacewatch	L5	6.7 km	MPC; JPL
320002	2007 DJ_{29}	—	February 17, 2007	Kitt Peak	Spacewatch	KOR	1.9 km	MPC; JPL
320003	2007 DP_{30}	—	February 17, 2007	Kitt Peak	Spacewatch	·	2.7 km	MPC; JPL
320004	2007 DY_{33}	—	February 17, 2007	Kitt Peak	Spacewatch	URS	3.6 km	MPC; JPL
320005	2007 DJ_{35}	—	February 17, 2007	Kitt Peak	Spacewatch	·	4.5 km	MPC; JPL
320006	2007 DS_{35}	—	February 17, 2007	Kitt Peak	Spacewatch	EOS	2.5 km	MPC; JPL
320007	2007 DD_{38}	—	February 17, 2007	Kitt Peak	Spacewatch	·	2.4 km	MPC; JPL
320008	2007 DQ_{38}	—	February 17, 2007	Kitt Peak	Spacewatch	·	3.8 km	MPC; JPL
320009	2007 DU_{38}	—	February 17, 2007	Kitt Peak	Spacewatch	·	3.7 km	MPC; JPL
320010	2007 DL_{39}	—	February 17, 2007	Kitt Peak	Spacewatch	·	4.1 km	MPC; JPL
320011	2007 DC_{47}	—	February 21, 2007	Socorro	LINEAR	·	2.3 km	MPC; JPL
320012	2007 DE_{49}	—	February 22, 2007	Altschwendt	W. Ries	·	1.8 km	MPC; JPL
320013	2007 DA_{53}	—	February 19, 2007	Mount Lemmon	Mount Lemmon Survey	·	1.4 km	MPC; JPL
320014	2007 DP_{54}	—	February 21, 2007	Kitt Peak	Spacewatch	·	2.2 km	MPC; JPL
320015	2007 DG_{56}	—	August 28, 2005	Kitt Peak	Spacewatch	·	1.2 km	MPC; JPL
320016	2007 DW_{58}	—	February 21, 2007	Kitt Peak	Spacewatch	H	610 m	MPC; JPL
320017	2007 DG_{61}	—	February 21, 2007	Catalina	CSS	H	940 m	MPC; JPL
320018	2007 DZ_{64}	—	February 21, 2007	Kitt Peak	Spacewatch	EOS	1.6 km	MPC; JPL
320019	2007 DE_{69}	—	October 1, 2005	Mount Lemmon	Mount Lemmon Survey	·	1.3 km	MPC; JPL
320020	2007 DO_{71}	—	February 21, 2007	Kitt Peak	Spacewatch	·	2.4 km	MPC; JPL
320021	2007 DQ_{74}	—	February 21, 2007	Kitt Peak	Spacewatch	·	3.0 km	MPC; JPL
320022	2007 DZ_{74}	—	February 21, 2007	Kitt Peak	Spacewatch	EOS	2.1 km	MPC; JPL
320023	2007 DT_{75}	—	February 21, 2007	Kitt Peak	Spacewatch	KOR	1.8 km	MPC; JPL
320024	2007 DY_{75}	—	February 21, 2007	Mount Lemmon	Mount Lemmon Survey	KOR	1.4 km	MPC; JPL
320025	2007 DT_{76}	—	February 22, 2007	Anderson Mesa	LONEOS	·	2.6 km	MPC; JPL
320026	2007 DA_{86}	—	February 21, 2007	Mount Lemmon	Mount Lemmon Survey	·	2.4 km	MPC; JPL
320027	2007 DB_{91}	—	February 23, 2007	Mount Lemmon	Mount Lemmon Survey	·	3.7 km	MPC; JPL
320028	2007 DJ_{92}	—	February 23, 2007	Kitt Peak	Spacewatch	AST	1.8 km	MPC; JPL
320029	2007 DO_{94}	—	February 23, 2007	Kitt Peak	Spacewatch	·	2.3 km	MPC; JPL
320030	2007 DC_{96}	—	February 23, 2007	Kitt Peak	Spacewatch	·	1.8 km	MPC; JPL
320031	2007 DC_{97}	—	February 23, 2007	Kitt Peak	Spacewatch	·	2.3 km	MPC; JPL
320032	2007 DK_{97}	—	February 23, 2007	Kitt Peak	Spacewatch	V	790 m	MPC; JPL
320033	2007 DS_{97}	—	February 23, 2007	Kitt Peak	Spacewatch	·	880 m	MPC; JPL
320034	2007 DE_{98}	—	February 25, 2007	Mount Lemmon	Mount Lemmon Survey	·	1.8 km	MPC; JPL
320035	2007 DS_{105}	—	February 17, 2007	Mount Lemmon	Mount Lemmon Survey	·	2.4 km	MPC; JPL
320036	2007 DZ_{105}	—	February 23, 2007	Mount Lemmon	Mount Lemmon Survey	·	2.2 km	MPC; JPL
320037	2007 DQ_{107}	—	February 22, 2007	Mount Graham	Mount Graham	AGN	1.3 km	MPC; JPL
320038	2007 DV_{108}	—	February 22, 2007	Mount Graham	Mount Graham	KOR	1.2 km	MPC; JPL
320039	2007 DA_{109}	—	February 26, 2007	Mount Lemmon	Mount Lemmon Survey	·	3.4 km	MPC; JPL
320040	2007 DB_{112}	—	February 26, 2007	Mount Lemmon	Mount Lemmon Survey	·	3.3 km	MPC; JPL
320041	2007 DP_{112}	—	February 26, 2007	Mount Lemmon	Mount Lemmon Survey	·	2.6 km	MPC; JPL
320042	2007 DR_{114}	—	February 26, 2007	Mount Lemmon	Mount Lemmon Survey	KOR	1.9 km	MPC; JPL
320043	2007 DS_{114}	—	February 26, 2007	Mount Lemmon	Mount Lemmon Survey	·	2.7 km	MPC; JPL
320044	2007 DL_{116}	—	February 26, 2007	Mount Lemmon	Mount Lemmon Survey	·	4.2 km	MPC; JPL
320045	2007 DQ_{116}	—	February 16, 2007	Catalina	CSS	·	4.4 km	MPC; JPL
320046	2007 DB_{117}	—	February 16, 2007	Catalina	CSS	·	5.4 km	MPC; JPL
320047	2007 DH_{117}	—	February 17, 2007	Kitt Peak	Spacewatch	L5	12 km	MPC; JPL
320048	2007 ED_{1}	—	March 6, 2007	Palomar	NEAT	DOR	2.8 km	MPC; JPL
320049	2007 EY_{1}	—	March 9, 2007	Kitt Peak	Spacewatch	·	1.6 km	MPC; JPL
320050	2007 EQ_{2}	—	March 9, 2007	Mount Lemmon	Mount Lemmon Survey	·	2.3 km	MPC; JPL
320051	2007 EZ_{2}	—	March 9, 2007	Catalina	CSS	·	1.6 km	MPC; JPL
320052	2007 EA_{7}	—	March 9, 2007	Mount Lemmon	Mount Lemmon Survey	MAS	730 m	MPC; JPL
320053	2007 EG_{9}	—	March 9, 2007	Mount Lemmon	Mount Lemmon Survey	EOS	2.8 km	MPC; JPL
320054	2007 EO_{15}	—	March 9, 2007	Kitt Peak	Spacewatch	KOR	1.9 km	MPC; JPL
320055	2007 EK_{18}	—	March 9, 2007	Palomar	NEAT	·	3.1 km	MPC; JPL
320056	2007 ED_{21}	—	March 10, 2007	Kitt Peak	Spacewatch	·	2.3 km	MPC; JPL
320057	2007 EH_{21}	—	March 10, 2007	Kitt Peak	Spacewatch	EOS	2.3 km	MPC; JPL
320058	2007 EQ_{22}	—	February 25, 2007	Kitt Peak	Spacewatch	THM	2.4 km	MPC; JPL
320059	2007 EV_{25}	—	March 10, 2007	Palomar	NEAT	·	4.6 km	MPC; JPL
320060	2007 ET_{26}	—	March 11, 2007	Marly	P. Kocher	·	2.6 km	MPC; JPL
320061	2007 EM_{29}	—	March 9, 2007	Kitt Peak	Spacewatch	VER	3.5 km	MPC; JPL
320062	2007 EP_{29}	—	March 9, 2007	Palomar	NEAT	EOS	2.6 km	MPC; JPL
320063	2007 EN_{32}	—	March 10, 2007	Mount Lemmon	Mount Lemmon Survey	KOR	1.3 km	MPC; JPL
320064	2007 EW_{34}	—	March 10, 2007	Palomar	NEAT	PAD	2.5 km	MPC; JPL
320065 Erbaghjolu	2007 EW_{38}	Erbaghjolu	March 11, 2007	Vicques	M. Ory	EOS	2.3 km	MPC; JPL
320066	2007 EA_{40}	—	March 11, 2007	Kitt Peak	Spacewatch	L5	10 km	MPC; JPL
320067	2007 EL_{40}	—	March 11, 2007	Kitt Peak	Spacewatch	H	600 m	MPC; JPL
320068	2007 EH_{42}	—	March 9, 2007	Kitt Peak	Spacewatch	·	2.0 km	MPC; JPL
320069	2007 EL_{43}	—	March 9, 2007	Kitt Peak	Spacewatch	·	2.3 km	MPC; JPL
320070	2007 EZ_{43}	—	March 9, 2007	Kitt Peak	Spacewatch	·	3.5 km	MPC; JPL
320071	2007 EF_{45}	—	March 9, 2007	Kitt Peak	Spacewatch	·	2.6 km	MPC; JPL
320072	2007 EY_{48}	—	March 9, 2007	Kitt Peak	Spacewatch	·	3.7 km	MPC; JPL
320073	2007 EF_{51}	—	March 10, 2007	Kitt Peak	Spacewatch	·	2.5 km	MPC; JPL
320074	2007 EL_{51}	—	March 10, 2007	Mount Lemmon	Mount Lemmon Survey	·	2.9 km	MPC; JPL
320075	2007 EN_{51}	—	March 10, 2007	Mount Lemmon	Mount Lemmon Survey	EOS	2.6 km	MPC; JPL
320076	2007 EF_{54}	—	March 11, 2007	Mount Lemmon	Mount Lemmon Survey	·	3.5 km	MPC; JPL
320077	2007 EY_{62}	—	February 17, 2007	Kitt Peak	Spacewatch	·	2.8 km	MPC; JPL
320078	2007 EH_{63}	—	March 10, 2007	Kitt Peak	Spacewatch	·	2.0 km	MPC; JPL
320079	2007 ER_{63}	—	March 10, 2007	Kitt Peak	Spacewatch	THM	2.5 km	MPC; JPL
320080	2007 EL_{66}	—	March 10, 2007	Kitt Peak	Spacewatch	·	2.3 km	MPC; JPL
320081	2007 EY_{67}	—	March 10, 2007	Kitt Peak	Spacewatch	·	2.2 km	MPC; JPL
320082	2007 EZ_{73}	—	March 10, 2007	Mount Lemmon	Mount Lemmon Survey	(8737)	4.0 km	MPC; JPL
320083	2007 ER_{74}	—	March 10, 2007	Kitt Peak	Spacewatch	·	3.4 km	MPC; JPL
320084	2007 EY_{74}	—	March 10, 2007	Kitt Peak	Spacewatch	NYS	1.1 km	MPC; JPL
320085	2007 EO_{78}	—	March 10, 2007	Mount Lemmon	Mount Lemmon Survey	VER	3.1 km	MPC; JPL
320086	2007 EC_{80}	—	March 10, 2007	Palomar	NEAT	·	3.5 km	MPC; JPL
320087	2007 EP_{85}	—	March 12, 2007	Kitt Peak	Spacewatch	·	6.2 km	MPC; JPL
320088	2007 EX_{87}	—	March 14, 2007	Wrightwood	J. W. Young	·	3.4 km	MPC; JPL
320089	2007 EU_{89}	—	March 9, 2007	Mount Lemmon	Mount Lemmon Survey	·	1.1 km	MPC; JPL
320090	2007 EZ_{91}	—	March 10, 2007	Kitt Peak	Spacewatch	·	2.1 km	MPC; JPL
320091	2007 EF_{96}	—	March 10, 2007	Mount Lemmon	Mount Lemmon Survey	·	4.1 km	MPC; JPL
320092	2007 EV_{97}	—	March 11, 2007	Kitt Peak	Spacewatch	·	2.1 km	MPC; JPL
320093	2007 ES_{98}	—	March 11, 2007	Kitt Peak	Spacewatch	L5	9.6 km	MPC; JPL
320094	2007 EC_{99}	—	March 11, 2007	Kitt Peak	Spacewatch	·	2.5 km	MPC; JPL
320095	2007 EF_{99}	—	March 11, 2007	Kitt Peak	Spacewatch	·	3.3 km	MPC; JPL
320096	2007 EA_{100}	—	March 11, 2007	Kitt Peak	Spacewatch	·	2.6 km	MPC; JPL
320097	2007 ET_{100}	—	March 11, 2007	Mount Lemmon	Mount Lemmon Survey	·	2.3 km	MPC; JPL
320098	2007 EZ_{101}	—	March 11, 2007	Kitt Peak	Spacewatch	H	700 m	MPC; JPL
320099	2007 EE_{106}	—	March 11, 2007	Kitt Peak	Spacewatch	·	2.7 km	MPC; JPL
320100	2007 ET_{114}	—	March 13, 2007	Mount Lemmon	Mount Lemmon Survey	·	3.0 km	MPC; JPL

== 320101–320200 ==
back to top

Designation			Discovery			Properties		Ref
Permanent	Provisional	Named after	Date	Site	Discoverer(s)	Category	Diam.	Ref
320101	2007 EB_{117}	—	March 13, 2007	Mount Lemmon	Mount Lemmon Survey	·	4.4 km	MPC; JPL
320102	2007 EK_{117}	—	March 13, 2007	Mount Lemmon	Mount Lemmon Survey	·	2.0 km	MPC; JPL
320103	2007 EU_{124}	—	March 14, 2007	Anderson Mesa	LONEOS	·	4.8 km	MPC; JPL
320104	2007 EY_{128}	—	March 9, 2007	Mount Lemmon	Mount Lemmon Survey	·	1.1 km	MPC; JPL
320105	2007 EY_{130}	—	March 9, 2007	Mount Lemmon	Mount Lemmon Survey	·	3.5 km	MPC; JPL
320106	2007 EV_{131}	—	March 9, 2007	Mount Lemmon	Mount Lemmon Survey	THM	2.6 km	MPC; JPL
320107	2007 ET_{132}	—	March 9, 2007	Mount Lemmon	Mount Lemmon Survey	KOR	1.7 km	MPC; JPL
320108	2007 EB_{134}	—	March 9, 2007	Mount Lemmon	Mount Lemmon Survey	·	2.7 km	MPC; JPL
320109	2007 ED_{136}	—	March 10, 2007	Mount Lemmon	Mount Lemmon Survey	EOS	2.0 km	MPC; JPL
320110	2007 EE_{152}	—	February 26, 2007	Mount Lemmon	Mount Lemmon Survey	·	2.7 km	MPC; JPL
320111	2007 EL_{153}	—	March 12, 2007	Mount Lemmon	Mount Lemmon Survey	·	3.6 km	MPC; JPL
320112	2007 ER_{154}	—	March 12, 2007	Kitt Peak	Spacewatch	·	3.4 km	MPC; JPL
320113	2007 EP_{160}	—	March 14, 2007	Kitt Peak	Spacewatch	·	2.6 km	MPC; JPL
320114	2007 EY_{166}	—	March 11, 2007	Mount Lemmon	Mount Lemmon Survey	·	3.9 km	MPC; JPL
320115	2007 EO_{169}	—	March 13, 2007	Kitt Peak	Spacewatch	·	1.9 km	MPC; JPL
320116	2007 EC_{170}	—	March 14, 2007	Mount Lemmon	Mount Lemmon Survey	HOF	2.6 km	MPC; JPL
320117	2007 EW_{171}	—	March 13, 2007	Kitt Peak	Spacewatch	KOR	1.5 km	MPC; JPL
320118	2007 EA_{172}	—	March 14, 2007	Kitt Peak	Spacewatch	EOS	2.4 km	MPC; JPL
320119	2007 EQ_{173}	—	March 14, 2007	Kitt Peak	Spacewatch	·	3.4 km	MPC; JPL
320120	2007 EZ_{173}	—	March 14, 2007	Kitt Peak	Spacewatch	·	2.1 km	MPC; JPL
320121	2007 EF_{176}	—	March 14, 2007	Kitt Peak	Spacewatch	·	3.0 km	MPC; JPL
320122	2007 ET_{180}	—	March 14, 2007	Mount Lemmon	Mount Lemmon Survey	·	2.9 km	MPC; JPL
320123	2007 EZ_{180}	—	March 14, 2007	Kitt Peak	Spacewatch	·	3.8 km	MPC; JPL
320124	2007 EZ_{182}	—	March 15, 2007	Mount Lemmon	Mount Lemmon Survey	·	3.7 km	MPC; JPL
320125	2007 EQ_{185}	—	March 14, 2007	Mount Lemmon	Mount Lemmon Survey	·	2.9 km	MPC; JPL
320126	2007 EO_{187}	—	March 15, 2007	Mount Lemmon	Mount Lemmon Survey	·	2.8 km	MPC; JPL
320127	2007 EW_{190}	—	March 13, 2007	Kitt Peak	Spacewatch	EOS	2.2 km	MPC; JPL
320128	2007 EY_{195}	—	March 15, 2007	Mount Lemmon	Mount Lemmon Survey	EOS	4.3 km	MPC; JPL
320129	2007 ED_{196}	—	March 15, 2007	Kitt Peak	Spacewatch	·	3.1 km	MPC; JPL
320130	2007 EF_{196}	—	March 15, 2007	Kitt Peak	Spacewatch	·	1.8 km	MPC; JPL
320131	2007 EL_{196}	—	March 15, 2007	Kitt Peak	Spacewatch	·	4.0 km	MPC; JPL
320132	2007 EU_{196}	—	March 15, 2007	Kitt Peak	Spacewatch	·	3.2 km	MPC; JPL
320133	2007 EP_{201}	—	March 6, 2007	Palomar	NEAT	·	3.2 km	MPC; JPL
320134	2007 ET_{201}	—	October 20, 1995	Kitt Peak	Spacewatch	·	2.1 km	MPC; JPL
320135	2007 ED_{205}	—	March 11, 2007	Kitt Peak	Spacewatch	EOS	2.2 km	MPC; JPL
320136	2007 EE_{206}	—	March 12, 2007	Kitt Peak	Spacewatch	TEL	1.6 km	MPC; JPL
320137	2007 EN_{213}	—	March 13, 2007	Kitt Peak	Spacewatch	·	1.9 km	MPC; JPL
320138	2007 EN_{214}	—	March 10, 2007	Mount Lemmon	Mount Lemmon Survey	·	2.7 km	MPC; JPL
320139	2007 ER_{214}	—	March 13, 2007	Mount Lemmon	Mount Lemmon Survey	·	2.6 km	MPC; JPL
320140	2007 EX_{214}	—	March 10, 2007	Mount Lemmon	Mount Lemmon Survey	KOR	1.6 km	MPC; JPL
320141	2007 EY_{214}	—	March 12, 2007	Catalina	CSS	·	6.8 km	MPC; JPL
320142	2007 EL_{215}	—	March 11, 2007	Anderson Mesa	LONEOS	·	3.4 km	MPC; JPL
320143	2007 EH_{218}	—	March 9, 2007	Mount Lemmon	Mount Lemmon Survey	·	2.4 km	MPC; JPL
320144	2007 EY_{219}	—	March 11, 2007	Mount Lemmon	Mount Lemmon Survey	TIR	3.9 km	MPC; JPL
320145	2007 EC_{223}	—	March 11, 2007	Catalina	CSS	·	4.2 km	MPC; JPL
320146	2007 EJ_{224}	—	January 21, 2002	Kitt Peak	Spacewatch	·	1.7 km	MPC; JPL
320147	2007 FK_{2}	—	March 16, 2007	Catalina	CSS	·	3.0 km	MPC; JPL
320148	2007 FD_{5}	—	February 26, 2007	Mount Lemmon	Mount Lemmon Survey	EOS	2.2 km	MPC; JPL
320149	2007 FO_{8}	—	March 16, 2007	Kitt Peak	Spacewatch	·	3.6 km	MPC; JPL
320150	2007 FF_{12}	—	March 17, 2007	Socorro	LINEAR	·	1.4 km	MPC; JPL
320151	2007 FC_{19}	—	March 20, 2007	Mount Lemmon	Mount Lemmon Survey	·	2.2 km	MPC; JPL
320152	2007 FH_{19}	—	March 20, 2007	Mount Lemmon	Mount Lemmon Survey	·	4.2 km	MPC; JPL
320153 Eglītis	2007 FU_{20}	Eglītis	March 23, 2007	Moletai	K. Černis	·	4.4 km	MPC; JPL
320154	2007 FA_{22}	—	March 20, 2007	Kitt Peak	Spacewatch	·	2.8 km	MPC; JPL
320155	2007 FP_{23}	—	March 20, 2007	Kitt Peak	Spacewatch	·	2.5 km	MPC; JPL
320156	2007 FP_{28}	—	March 20, 2007	Mount Lemmon	Mount Lemmon Survey	·	2.3 km	MPC; JPL
320157	2007 FC_{30}	—	March 20, 2007	Kitt Peak	Spacewatch	·	2.7 km	MPC; JPL
320158	2007 FK_{30}	—	February 25, 2007	Mount Lemmon	Mount Lemmon Survey	·	2.5 km	MPC; JPL
320159	2007 FJ_{33}	—	March 25, 2007	Mount Lemmon	Mount Lemmon Survey	·	2.0 km	MPC; JPL
320160	2007 FG_{41}	—	March 20, 2007	Kitt Peak	Spacewatch	·	5.3 km	MPC; JPL
320161	2007 FU_{48}	—	November 30, 2005	Kitt Peak	Spacewatch	AST	1.5 km	MPC; JPL
320162	2007 GP	—	April 7, 2007	Mount Lemmon	Mount Lemmon Survey	·	3.0 km	MPC; JPL
320163	2007 GS	—	April 7, 2007	Mount Lemmon	Mount Lemmon Survey	·	2.8 km	MPC; JPL
320164	2007 GP_{1}	—	April 8, 2007	Bergisch Gladbach	W. Bickel	HYG	4.3 km	MPC; JPL
320165	2007 GO_{2}	—	February 23, 2007	Mount Lemmon	Mount Lemmon Survey	·	2.8 km	MPC; JPL
320166	2007 GY_{2}	—	April 7, 2007	Mount Lemmon	Mount Lemmon Survey	·	2.4 km	MPC; JPL
320167	2007 GZ_{3}	—	April 11, 2007	Altschwendt	W. Ries	·	7.2 km	MPC; JPL
320168	2007 GD_{5}	—	April 12, 2007	Bergisch Gladbach	W. Bickel	EOS	2.0 km	MPC; JPL
320169	2007 GZ_{7}	—	April 7, 2007	Mount Lemmon	Mount Lemmon Survey	EOS	2.4 km	MPC; JPL
320170	2007 GX_{8}	—	April 7, 2007	Mount Lemmon	Mount Lemmon Survey	·	3.2 km	MPC; JPL
320171	2007 GY_{10}	—	April 11, 2007	Kitt Peak	Spacewatch	·	4.2 km	MPC; JPL
320172	2007 GD_{16}	—	April 11, 2007	Kitt Peak	Spacewatch	·	2.2 km	MPC; JPL
320173	2007 GO_{16}	—	April 11, 2007	Kitt Peak	Spacewatch	·	1.7 km	MPC; JPL
320174	2007 GV_{22}	—	April 11, 2007	Mount Lemmon	Mount Lemmon Survey	·	3.9 km	MPC; JPL
320175	2007 GA_{23}	—	April 11, 2007	Mount Lemmon	Mount Lemmon Survey	·	2.5 km	MPC; JPL
320176	2007 GE_{24}	—	April 11, 2007	Kitt Peak	Spacewatch	EOS	2.1 km	MPC; JPL
320177	2007 GY_{26}	—	April 14, 2007	Kitt Peak	Spacewatch	(31811)	3.8 km	MPC; JPL
320178	2007 GW_{27}	—	April 11, 2007	Catalina	CSS	H	860 m	MPC; JPL
320179	2007 GJ_{28}	—	April 15, 2007	Catalina	CSS	EOS	2.7 km	MPC; JPL
320180	2007 GZ_{28}	—	April 15, 2007	Bergisch Gladbach	W. Bickel	EOS	2.3 km	MPC; JPL
320181	2007 GM_{31}	—	April 15, 2007	Mount Lemmon	Mount Lemmon Survey	·	3.1 km	MPC; JPL
320182	2007 GR_{31}	—	April 15, 2007	Mount Lemmon	Mount Lemmon Survey	·	3.1 km	MPC; JPL
320183	2007 GP_{32}	—	March 11, 2007	Kitt Peak	Spacewatch	·	4.5 km	MPC; JPL
320184	2007 GY_{36}	—	April 14, 2007	Kitt Peak	Spacewatch	·	3.0 km	MPC; JPL
320185	2007 GZ_{39}	—	April 14, 2007	Kitt Peak	Spacewatch	·	3.9 km	MPC; JPL
320186	2007 GO_{45}	—	April 14, 2007	Kitt Peak	Spacewatch	EOS	2.6 km	MPC; JPL
320187	2007 GQ_{47}	—	April 14, 2007	Mount Lemmon	Mount Lemmon Survey	·	1.1 km	MPC; JPL
320188	2007 GT_{48}	—	April 14, 2007	Kitt Peak	Spacewatch	NYS	1.3 km	MPC; JPL
320189	2007 GC_{51}	—	April 15, 2007	Kitt Peak	Spacewatch	LIX	4.1 km	MPC; JPL
320190	2007 GK_{51}	—	April 10, 2007	Charleston	Astronomical Research Observatory	·	2.2 km	MPC; JPL
320191	2007 GX_{58}	—	April 15, 2007	Mount Lemmon	Mount Lemmon Survey	·	2.5 km	MPC; JPL
320192	2007 GR_{60}	—	April 15, 2007	Kitt Peak	Spacewatch	·	3.3 km	MPC; JPL
320193	2007 GT_{64}	—	April 15, 2007	Kitt Peak	Spacewatch	·	1.4 km	MPC; JPL
320194	2007 GF_{65}	—	April 15, 2007	Kitt Peak	Spacewatch	·	2.9 km	MPC; JPL
320195	2007 GG_{67}	—	April 15, 2007	Kitt Peak	Spacewatch	·	2.6 km	MPC; JPL
320196	2007 GY_{68}	—	April 15, 2007	Mount Lemmon	Mount Lemmon Survey	·	2.9 km	MPC; JPL
320197	2007 GC_{69}	—	April 15, 2007	Kitt Peak	Spacewatch	·	3.4 km	MPC; JPL
320198	2007 GX_{76}	—	April 13, 2007	Siding Spring	SSS	·	2.9 km	MPC; JPL
320199	2007 HH_{1}	—	April 16, 2007	Catalina	CSS	·	3.2 km	MPC; JPL
320200	2007 HO_{1}	—	April 16, 2007	Socorro	LINEAR	EOS	3.1 km	MPC; JPL

== 320201–320300 ==
back to top

Designation			Discovery			Properties		Ref
Permanent	Provisional	Named after	Date	Site	Discoverer(s)	Category	Diam.	Ref
320201	2007 HM_{7}	—	April 16, 2007	Mount Lemmon	Mount Lemmon Survey	·	3.8 km	MPC; JPL
320202	2007 HU_{7}	—	April 17, 2007	Anderson Mesa	LONEOS	·	870 m	MPC; JPL
320203	2007 HB_{8}	—	April 18, 2007	Mount Lemmon	Mount Lemmon Survey	VER	2.7 km	MPC; JPL
320204	2007 HW_{11}	—	April 18, 2007	Mount Lemmon	Mount Lemmon Survey	HYG	3.0 km	MPC; JPL
320205	2007 HX_{12}	—	April 16, 2007	Anderson Mesa	LONEOS	·	4.2 km	MPC; JPL
320206	2007 HJ_{13}	—	April 18, 2007	Kitt Peak	Spacewatch	·	3.5 km	MPC; JPL
320207	2007 HU_{18}	—	April 16, 2007	Catalina	CSS	·	4.0 km	MPC; JPL
320208	2007 HK_{25}	—	April 18, 2007	Mount Lemmon	Mount Lemmon Survey	·	1.9 km	MPC; JPL
320209	2007 HA_{27}	—	April 18, 2007	Kitt Peak	Spacewatch	·	2.7 km	MPC; JPL
320210	2007 HL_{28}	—	April 18, 2007	Purple Mountain	PMO NEO Survey Program	EOS ·	2.9 km	MPC; JPL
320211	2007 HY_{31}	—	April 19, 2007	Mount Lemmon	Mount Lemmon Survey	·	3.3 km	MPC; JPL
320212	2007 HH_{32}	—	April 19, 2007	Mount Lemmon	Mount Lemmon Survey	·	1.8 km	MPC; JPL
320213	2007 HP_{35}	—	April 19, 2007	Kitt Peak	Spacewatch	AGN	1.3 km	MPC; JPL
320214	2007 HH_{38}	—	April 20, 2007	Kitt Peak	Spacewatch	HYG	3.0 km	MPC; JPL
320215	2007 HK_{38}	—	April 20, 2007	Kitt Peak	Spacewatch	·	1.5 km	MPC; JPL
320216	2007 HK_{44}	—	April 23, 2007	Tiki	S. F. Hönig, Teamo, N.	·	2.8 km	MPC; JPL
320217	2007 HF_{45}	—	April 18, 2007	Catalina	CSS	TIR	4.0 km	MPC; JPL
320218	2007 HG_{45}	—	April 18, 2007	Kitt Peak	Spacewatch	·	2.6 km	MPC; JPL
320219	2007 HW_{56}	—	April 22, 2007	Kitt Peak	Spacewatch	·	2.1 km	MPC; JPL
320220	2007 HE_{60}	—	April 18, 2007	Mount Lemmon	Mount Lemmon Survey	·	2.7 km	MPC; JPL
320221	2007 HL_{71}	—	April 22, 2007	Catalina	CSS	·	3.1 km	MPC; JPL
320222	2007 HY_{71}	—	April 22, 2007	Kitt Peak	Spacewatch	·	4.1 km	MPC; JPL
320223	2007 HG_{72}	—	April 22, 2007	Kitt Peak	Spacewatch	EOS	3.3 km	MPC; JPL
320224	2007 HS_{74}	—	April 22, 2007	Kitt Peak	Spacewatch	·	3.1 km	MPC; JPL
320225	2007 HJ_{80}	—	April 25, 2007	Mount Lemmon	Mount Lemmon Survey	·	3.8 km	MPC; JPL
320226	2007 HP_{96}	—	April 18, 2007	Mount Lemmon	Mount Lemmon Survey	·	2.7 km	MPC; JPL
320227	2007 HE_{98}	—	April 22, 2007	Catalina	CSS	·	3.6 km	MPC; JPL
320228	2007 JC_{3}	—	May 6, 2007	Kitt Peak	Spacewatch	·	3.3 km	MPC; JPL
320229	2007 JB_{8}	—	May 9, 2007	Mount Lemmon	Mount Lemmon Survey	·	930 m	MPC; JPL
320230	2007 JW_{8}	—	May 9, 2007	Mount Lemmon	Mount Lemmon Survey	·	1.3 km	MPC; JPL
320231	2007 JL_{14}	—	April 19, 2007	Kitt Peak	Spacewatch	·	1.7 km	MPC; JPL
320232	2007 JP_{15}	—	May 10, 2007	Mount Lemmon	Mount Lemmon Survey	·	2.4 km	MPC; JPL
320233	2007 JK_{17}	—	May 7, 2007	Kitt Peak	Spacewatch	·	2.0 km	MPC; JPL
320234	2007 JS_{19}	—	May 10, 2007	Mount Lemmon	Mount Lemmon Survey	·	4.1 km	MPC; JPL
320235	2007 JF_{21}	—	May 10, 2007	Desert Moon	Stevens, B. L.	·	3.9 km	MPC; JPL
320236	2007 JP_{21}	—	May 7, 2007	Kitt Peak	Spacewatch	·	4.1 km	MPC; JPL
320237	2007 JA_{27}	—	May 9, 2007	Kitt Peak	Spacewatch	·	2.6 km	MPC; JPL
320238	2007 JD_{28}	—	May 10, 2007	Kitt Peak	Spacewatch	·	2.7 km	MPC; JPL
320239	2007 JE_{32}	—	May 12, 2007	Kitt Peak	Spacewatch	·	4.6 km	MPC; JPL
320240	2007 JG_{33}	—	May 12, 2007	Mount Lemmon	Mount Lemmon Survey	·	3.9 km	MPC; JPL
320241	2007 JH_{35}	—	May 13, 2007	Siding Spring	SSS	EUP	5.6 km	MPC; JPL
320242	2007 JG_{42}	—	May 8, 2007	Catalina	CSS	EUP	3.6 km	MPC; JPL
320243	2007 JQ_{43}	—	May 11, 2007	Kitt Peak	Spacewatch	·	4.4 km	MPC; JPL
320244	2007 KP_{1}	—	May 17, 2007	Kitt Peak	Spacewatch	·	2.4 km	MPC; JPL
320245	2007 KH_{3}	—	May 22, 2007	Tiki	S. F. Hönig, Teamo, N.	V	820 m	MPC; JPL
320246	2007 KO_{7}	—	May 16, 2007	Siding Spring	SSS	·	1.5 km	MPC; JPL
320247	2007 LZ_{4}	—	June 8, 2007	Kitt Peak	Spacewatch	·	1.6 km	MPC; JPL
320248	2007 LD_{10}	—	June 9, 2007	Kitt Peak	Spacewatch	·	4.1 km	MPC; JPL
320249	2007 LB_{16}	—	June 10, 2007	Kitt Peak	Spacewatch	·	4.7 km	MPC; JPL
320250	2007 MV	—	June 16, 2007	Kitt Peak	Spacewatch	EOS	2.1 km	MPC; JPL
320251	2007 MG_{16}	—	June 21, 2007	Socorro	LINEAR	·	2.9 km	MPC; JPL
320252	2007 ML_{16}	—	June 22, 2007	Kitt Peak	Spacewatch	TIR	3.0 km	MPC; JPL
320253	2007 OF	—	July 16, 2007	La Sagra	OAM	·	4.1 km	MPC; JPL
320254	2007 PE_{4}	—	August 8, 2007	Siding Spring	SSS	·	2.8 km	MPC; JPL
320255	2007 PZ_{4}	—	August 5, 2007	Socorro	LINEAR	·	2.2 km	MPC; JPL
320256	2007 PS_{24}	—	August 12, 2007	Socorro	LINEAR	·	990 m	MPC; JPL
320257	2007 PU_{26}	—	August 12, 2007	Bergisch Gladbach	W. Bickel	THM	2.7 km	MPC; JPL
320258	2007 PO_{27}	—	August 14, 2007	Altschwendt	W. Ries	·	1.1 km	MPC; JPL
320259	2007 PJ_{46}	—	August 9, 2007	Kitt Peak	Spacewatch	MRX	1.4 km	MPC; JPL
320260 Bertout	2007 QA_{5}	Bertout	August 31, 2007	Siding Spring	L. Kiss, K. Sárneczky	·	2.3 km	MPC; JPL
320261	2007 QO_{9}	—	August 22, 2007	Socorro	LINEAR	·	5.0 km	MPC; JPL
320262	2007 RA	—	September 1, 2007	Eskridge	G. Hug	·	2.3 km	MPC; JPL
320263	2007 RQ_{4}	—	September 3, 2007	Catalina	CSS	·	3.8 km	MPC; JPL
320264	2007 RD_{7}	—	September 6, 2007	Dauban	Chante-Perdrix	·	1.2 km	MPC; JPL
320265	2007 RH_{7}	—	September 6, 2007	Dauban	Chante-Perdrix	MAS	850 m	MPC; JPL
320266	2007 RK_{9}	—	September 4, 2007	Catalina	CSS	·	1.6 km	MPC; JPL
320267	2007 RL_{17}	—	September 13, 2007	Mount Lemmon	Mount Lemmon Survey	(7605)	4.5 km	MPC; JPL
320268	2007 RG_{19}	—	September 3, 2007	Catalina	CSS	·	3.4 km	MPC; JPL
320269	2007 RY_{27}	—	September 4, 2007	Catalina	CSS	·	920 m	MPC; JPL
320270	2007 RU_{43}	—	September 9, 2007	Kitt Peak	Spacewatch	·	890 m	MPC; JPL
320271	2007 RX_{63}	—	September 10, 2007	Mount Lemmon	Mount Lemmon Survey	THM	2.7 km	MPC; JPL
320272	2007 RO_{66}	—	September 10, 2007	Mount Lemmon	Mount Lemmon Survey	·	2.6 km	MPC; JPL
320273	2007 RR_{68}	—	September 10, 2007	Kitt Peak	Spacewatch	·	660 m	MPC; JPL
320274	2007 RD_{72}	—	September 10, 2007	Kitt Peak	Spacewatch	·	2.3 km	MPC; JPL
320275	2007 RF_{82}	—	September 10, 2007	Mount Lemmon	Mount Lemmon Survey	·	2.9 km	MPC; JPL
320276	2007 RL_{95}	—	September 10, 2007	Mount Lemmon	Mount Lemmon Survey	·	820 m	MPC; JPL
320277	2007 RH_{100}	—	September 11, 2007	Mount Lemmon	Mount Lemmon Survey	·	1.5 km	MPC; JPL
320278	2007 RV_{105}	—	September 11, 2007	Catalina	CSS	·	860 m	MPC; JPL
320279	2007 RS_{127}	—	September 12, 2007	Mount Lemmon	Mount Lemmon Survey	·	3.4 km	MPC; JPL
320280	2007 RJ_{145}	—	September 14, 2007	Socorro	LINEAR	·	820 m	MPC; JPL
320281	2007 RR_{147}	—	September 11, 2007	Purple Mountain	PMO NEO Survey Program	AGN	1.7 km	MPC; JPL
320282	2007 RQ_{151}	—	September 10, 2007	Kitt Peak	Spacewatch	·	2.6 km	MPC; JPL
320283	2007 RN_{178}	—	September 10, 2007	Kitt Peak	Spacewatch	·	3.1 km	MPC; JPL
320284	2007 RW_{182}	—	September 12, 2007	Catalina	CSS	·	1.2 km	MPC; JPL
320285	2007 RQ_{185}	—	September 13, 2007	Mount Lemmon	Mount Lemmon Survey	·	2.7 km	MPC; JPL
320286	2007 RR_{188}	—	September 10, 2007	Kitt Peak	Spacewatch	L4	7.3 km	MPC; JPL
320287	2007 RJ_{190}	—	September 11, 2007	Kitt Peak	Spacewatch	AST	1.7 km	MPC; JPL
320288	2007 RQ_{192}	—	September 12, 2007	Anderson Mesa	LONEOS	·	2.4 km	MPC; JPL
320289	2007 RM_{201}	—	October 17, 2003	Kitt Peak	Spacewatch	·	2.0 km	MPC; JPL
320290	2007 RK_{204}	—	September 9, 2007	Kitt Peak	Spacewatch	·	3.9 km	MPC; JPL
320291	2007 RW_{216}	—	September 13, 2007	Anderson Mesa	LONEOS	·	960 m	MPC; JPL
320292	2007 RO_{221}	—	September 14, 2007	Mount Lemmon	Mount Lemmon Survey	AGN · fast?	1.4 km	MPC; JPL
320293	2007 RX_{222}	—	September 4, 2007	Catalina	CSS	·	1.0 km	MPC; JPL
320294	2007 RP_{225}	—	September 10, 2007	Kitt Peak	Spacewatch	·	1.3 km	MPC; JPL
320295	2007 RD_{242}	—	September 14, 2007	Socorro	LINEAR	·	870 m	MPC; JPL
320296	2007 RQ_{246}	—	September 12, 2007	Catalina	CSS	·	2.9 km	MPC; JPL
320297	2007 RU_{248}	—	September 13, 2007	Mount Lemmon	Mount Lemmon Survey	·	710 m	MPC; JPL
320298	2007 RP_{259}	—	September 14, 2007	Kitt Peak	Spacewatch	·	930 m	MPC; JPL
320299	2007 RR_{272}	—	September 15, 2007	Kitt Peak	Spacewatch	·	770 m	MPC; JPL
320300	2007 RR_{283}	—	September 14, 2007	Kitt Peak	Spacewatch	·	1.8 km	MPC; JPL

== 320301–320400 ==
back to top

Designation			Discovery			Properties		Ref
Permanent	Provisional	Named after	Date	Site	Discoverer(s)	Category	Diam.	Ref
320301	2007 RC_{290}	—	September 15, 2007	Mount Lemmon	Mount Lemmon Survey	·	1.2 km	MPC; JPL
320302	2007 RC_{308}	—	September 13, 2007	Mount Lemmon	Mount Lemmon Survey	L4	12 km	MPC; JPL
320303	2007 RQ_{309}	—	September 13, 2007	Socorro	LINEAR	THM	3.0 km	MPC; JPL
320304	2007 RB_{316}	—	September 13, 2007	Mount Lemmon	Mount Lemmon Survey	EOS	2.6 km	MPC; JPL
320305	2007 RB_{320}	—	September 13, 2007	Mount Lemmon	Mount Lemmon Survey	·	1.9 km	MPC; JPL
320306	2007 SX_{2}	—	September 16, 2007	Lulin	LUSS	·	1.0 km	MPC; JPL
320307	2007 SA_{4}	—	September 16, 2007	Socorro	LINEAR	·	1.3 km	MPC; JPL
320308	2007 SK_{14}	—	September 20, 2007	Catalina	CSS	NYS	1.0 km	MPC; JPL
320309	2007 SK_{21}	—	September 18, 2007	Catalina	CSS	·	3.9 km	MPC; JPL
320310	2007 SG_{23}	—	September 25, 2007	Mount Lemmon	Mount Lemmon Survey	·	900 m	MPC; JPL
320311	2007 TT	—	October 3, 2007	7300	W. K. Y. Yeung	·	1.6 km	MPC; JPL
320312	2007 TS_{1}	—	October 4, 2007	Mount Lemmon	Mount Lemmon Survey	·	810 m	MPC; JPL
320313	2007 TG_{2}	—	October 4, 2007	Kitt Peak	Spacewatch	·	2.4 km	MPC; JPL
320314	2007 TQ_{7}	—	October 7, 2007	Dauban	Chante-Perdrix	·	1.2 km	MPC; JPL
320315	2007 TD_{13}	—	October 6, 2007	Socorro	LINEAR	MAS	990 m	MPC; JPL
320316	2007 TK_{20}	—	October 8, 2007	Socorro	LINEAR	NYS	1.4 km	MPC; JPL
320317	2007 TP_{21}	—	October 4, 2007	Kitt Peak	Spacewatch	·	1.0 km	MPC; JPL
320318	2007 TW_{21}	—	October 7, 2007	Catalina	CSS	·	1.3 km	MPC; JPL
320319	2007 TU_{22}	—	October 10, 2007	Nashville	Clingan, R.	·	750 m	MPC; JPL
320320	2007 TQ_{25}	—	October 4, 2007	Kitt Peak	Spacewatch	·	760 m	MPC; JPL
320321	2007 TL_{30}	—	October 4, 2007	Kitt Peak	Spacewatch	·	980 m	MPC; JPL
320322	2007 TM_{31}	—	October 5, 2007	Kitt Peak	Spacewatch	·	1.2 km	MPC; JPL
320323	2007 TC_{38}	—	October 4, 2007	Catalina	CSS	·	1.3 km	MPC; JPL
320324	2007 TR_{45}	—	October 7, 2007	Catalina	CSS	·	960 m	MPC; JPL
320325	2007 TC_{47}	—	October 4, 2007	Kitt Peak	Spacewatch	·	3.0 km	MPC; JPL
320326	2007 TA_{48}	—	October 4, 2007	Kitt Peak	Spacewatch	·	720 m	MPC; JPL
320327	2007 TO_{63}	—	October 7, 2007	Mount Lemmon	Mount Lemmon Survey	KOR	1.6 km	MPC; JPL
320328	2007 TY_{64}	—	October 7, 2007	Mount Lemmon	Mount Lemmon Survey	NYS	1.4 km	MPC; JPL
320329	2007 TB_{76}	—	October 4, 2007	Kitt Peak	Spacewatch	·	730 m	MPC; JPL
320330	2007 TQ_{92}	—	October 5, 2007	Purple Mountain	PMO NEO Survey Program	·	940 m	MPC; JPL
320331	2007 TL_{109}	—	October 7, 2007	Catalina	CSS	·	800 m	MPC; JPL
320332	2007 TH_{116}	—	October 8, 2007	Purple Mountain	PMO NEO Survey Program	·	1.0 km	MPC; JPL
320333	2007 TZ_{122}	—	October 6, 2007	Kitt Peak	Spacewatch	KOR	1.3 km	MPC; JPL
320334	2007 TS_{123}	—	October 6, 2007	Kitt Peak	Spacewatch	·	3.5 km	MPC; JPL
320335	2007 TB_{125}	—	October 6, 2007	Kitt Peak	Spacewatch	·	900 m	MPC; JPL
320336	2007 TD_{129}	—	October 6, 2007	Kitt Peak	Spacewatch	KOR	1.4 km	MPC; JPL
320337	2007 TZ_{133}	—	October 7, 2007	Mount Lemmon	Mount Lemmon Survey	·	2.9 km	MPC; JPL
320338	2007 TO_{139}	—	October 9, 2007	Kitt Peak	Spacewatch	·	650 m	MPC; JPL
320339	2007 TC_{146}	—	October 6, 2007	Socorro	LINEAR	·	750 m	MPC; JPL
320340	2007 TJ_{146}	—	October 6, 2007	Socorro	LINEAR	·	770 m	MPC; JPL
320341	2007 TC_{152}	—	October 9, 2007	Socorro	LINEAR	·	2.8 km	MPC; JPL
320342	2007 TH_{154}	—	October 9, 2007	Socorro	LINEAR	·	760 m	MPC; JPL
320343	2007 TY_{160}	—	October 9, 2007	Socorro	LINEAR	·	1.2 km	MPC; JPL
320344	2007 TD_{170}	—	October 12, 2007	Socorro	LINEAR	·	1.1 km	MPC; JPL
320345	2007 TL_{171}	—	October 12, 2007	Dauban	Chante-Perdrix	·	1.3 km	MPC; JPL
320346	2007 TF_{180}	—	October 8, 2007	Kitt Peak	Spacewatch	·	1.7 km	MPC; JPL
320347	2007 TB_{183}	—	October 8, 2007	XuYi	PMO NEO Survey Program	·	800 m	MPC; JPL
320348	2007 TY_{183}	—	October 9, 2007	Purple Mountain	PMO NEO Survey Program	·	1.2 km	MPC; JPL
320349	2007 TK_{186}	—	October 13, 2007	Socorro	LINEAR	·	3.2 km	MPC; JPL
320350	2007 TZ_{187}	—	October 15, 2007	Socorro	LINEAR	·	810 m	MPC; JPL
320351	2007 TQ_{192}	—	October 5, 2007	Kitt Peak	Spacewatch	·	790 m	MPC; JPL
320352	2007 TJ_{202}	—	October 8, 2007	Mount Lemmon	Mount Lemmon Survey	·	1.6 km	MPC; JPL
320353	2007 TT_{202}	—	October 8, 2007	Mount Lemmon	Mount Lemmon Survey	·	720 m	MPC; JPL
320354	2007 TP_{210}	—	October 6, 2007	Kitt Peak	Spacewatch	·	870 m	MPC; JPL
320355	2007 TT_{211}	—	October 7, 2007	Kitt Peak	Spacewatch	·	1.9 km	MPC; JPL
320356	2007 TJ_{214}	—	October 7, 2007	Kitt Peak	Spacewatch	AGN	1.5 km	MPC; JPL
320357	2007 TQ_{227}	—	October 8, 2007	Kitt Peak	Spacewatch	·	880 m	MPC; JPL
320358	2007 TC_{228}	—	October 8, 2007	Kitt Peak	Spacewatch	·	1.0 km	MPC; JPL
320359	2007 TB_{231}	—	October 8, 2007	Kitt Peak	Spacewatch	·	1.8 km	MPC; JPL
320360	2007 TQ_{233}	—	October 8, 2007	Kitt Peak	Spacewatch	·	2.2 km	MPC; JPL
320361	2007 TR_{237}	—	October 9, 2007	Mount Lemmon	Mount Lemmon Survey	V	650 m	MPC; JPL
320362	2007 TH_{241}	—	October 7, 2007	Mount Lemmon	Mount Lemmon Survey	(2076)	820 m	MPC; JPL
320363	2007 TP_{247}	—	October 10, 2007	Kitt Peak	Spacewatch	·	810 m	MPC; JPL
320364	2007 TJ_{289}	—	November 10, 2004	Kitt Peak	Spacewatch	·	810 m	MPC; JPL
320365	2007 TL_{309}	—	October 10, 2007	Mount Lemmon	Mount Lemmon Survey	·	700 m	MPC; JPL
320366	2007 TE_{354}	—	October 10, 2007	Catalina	CSS	·	1.6 km	MPC; JPL
320367	2007 TS_{362}	—	October 14, 2007	Mount Lemmon	Mount Lemmon Survey	·	2.3 km	MPC; JPL
320368	2007 TL_{376}	—	October 10, 2007	Catalina	CSS	·	1.0 km	MPC; JPL
320369	2007 TO_{398}	—	October 15, 2007	Kitt Peak	Spacewatch	(883)	790 m	MPC; JPL
320370	2007 TP_{410}	—	October 14, 2007	Catalina	CSS	·	3.2 km	MPC; JPL
320371	2007 TF_{414}	—	October 15, 2007	Catalina	CSS	EOS	2.7 km	MPC; JPL
320372	2007 TA_{419}	—	October 10, 2007	Catalina	CSS	EOS	2.7 km	MPC; JPL
320373	2007 TV_{419}	—	October 5, 2007	Siding Spring	SSS	·	4.8 km	MPC; JPL
320374	2007 TK_{447}	—	October 11, 2007	Lulin	LUSS	·	1.2 km	MPC; JPL
320375	2007 TJ_{449}	—	October 9, 2007	Mount Lemmon	Mount Lemmon Survey	·	2.6 km	MPC; JPL
320376	2007 TV_{452}	—	October 12, 2007	Kitt Peak	Spacewatch	·	5.5 km	MPC; JPL
320377	2007 UP	—	October 16, 2007	Vallemare Borbona	V. S. Casulli	·	760 m	MPC; JPL
320378	2007 UR_{3}	—	October 19, 2007	Kitt Peak	Spacewatch	AMO	190 m	MPC; JPL
320379	2007 UE_{4}	—	October 18, 2007	Socorro	LINEAR	·	3.9 km	MPC; JPL
320380	2007 UR_{4}	—	October 17, 2007	Dauban	Chante-Perdrix	·	3.0 km	MPC; JPL
320381	2007 UR_{10}	—	October 18, 2007	Anderson Mesa	LONEOS	·	900 m	MPC; JPL
320382	2007 UT_{11}	—	October 19, 2007	Socorro	LINEAR	·	1.1 km	MPC; JPL
320383	2007 UL_{18}	—	October 17, 2007	Anderson Mesa	LONEOS	·	2.5 km	MPC; JPL
320384	2007 UR_{23}	—	October 16, 2007	Kitt Peak	Spacewatch	KOR	1.7 km	MPC; JPL
320385	2007 UT_{36}	—	October 19, 2007	Kitt Peak	Spacewatch	·	970 m	MPC; JPL
320386	2007 UV_{36}	—	October 19, 2007	Catalina	CSS	·	1.6 km	MPC; JPL
320387	2007 UZ_{40}	—	October 16, 2007	Kitt Peak	Spacewatch	·	980 m	MPC; JPL
320388	2007 UT_{43}	—	March 9, 2005	Mount Lemmon	Mount Lemmon Survey	AGN	1.2 km	MPC; JPL
320389	2007 UK_{47}	—	October 17, 2007	Mount Lemmon	Mount Lemmon Survey	·	2.4 km	MPC; JPL
320390	2007 UR_{48}	—	October 20, 2007	Mount Lemmon	Mount Lemmon Survey	·	2.7 km	MPC; JPL
320391	2007 UU_{52}	—	October 25, 2007	Mount Lemmon	Mount Lemmon Survey	·	740 m	MPC; JPL
320392	2007 UE_{60}	—	October 30, 2007	Mount Lemmon	Mount Lemmon Survey	·	790 m	MPC; JPL
320393	2007 UH_{65}	—	October 31, 2007	Kitt Peak	Spacewatch	·	2.8 km	MPC; JPL
320394	2007 UT_{69}	—	October 30, 2007	Mount Lemmon	Mount Lemmon Survey	AST	2.1 km	MPC; JPL
320395	2007 UQ_{73}	—	October 31, 2007	Mount Lemmon	Mount Lemmon Survey	MAS	800 m	MPC; JPL
320396	2007 UM_{95}	—	October 31, 2007	Mount Lemmon	Mount Lemmon Survey	NYS	800 m	MPC; JPL
320397	2007 UC_{101}	—	October 30, 2007	Kitt Peak	Spacewatch	·	1.6 km	MPC; JPL
320398	2007 UD_{101}	—	October 30, 2007	Kitt Peak	Spacewatch	·	5.3 km	MPC; JPL
320399	2007 UY_{105}	—	October 30, 2007	Kitt Peak	Spacewatch	·	4.6 km	MPC; JPL
320400	2007 UY_{108}	—	October 30, 2007	Kitt Peak	Spacewatch	KOR	1.5 km	MPC; JPL

== 320401–320500 ==
back to top

Designation			Discovery			Properties		Ref
Permanent	Provisional	Named after	Date	Site	Discoverer(s)	Category	Diam.	Ref
320401	2007 UK_{109}	—	October 30, 2007	Kitt Peak	Spacewatch	·	2.1 km	MPC; JPL
320402	2007 UC_{112}	—	October 30, 2007	Mount Lemmon	Mount Lemmon Survey	·	2.6 km	MPC; JPL
320403	2007 UD_{115}	—	October 31, 2007	Kitt Peak	Spacewatch	·	670 m	MPC; JPL
320404	2007 UF_{119}	—	October 30, 2007	Catalina	CSS	·	780 m	MPC; JPL
320405	2007 UN_{122}	—	October 30, 2007	Kitt Peak	Spacewatch	KOR	1.5 km	MPC; JPL
320406	2007 UC_{134}	—	October 20, 2007	Catalina	CSS	·	5.2 km	MPC; JPL
320407	2007 US_{138}	—	October 20, 2007	Mount Lemmon	Mount Lemmon Survey	·	710 m	MPC; JPL
320408	2007 UN_{139}	—	December 17, 2001	Kitt Peak	Spacewatch	·	990 m	MPC; JPL
320409	2007 UH_{140}	—	October 16, 2007	Mount Lemmon	Mount Lemmon Survey	·	980 m	MPC; JPL
320410	2007 VE	—	November 1, 2007	7300	W. K. Y. Yeung	·	2.4 km	MPC; JPL
320411	2007 VL_{1}	—	November 2, 2007	Front Royal	Skillman, D. R.	·	1.1 km	MPC; JPL
320412	2007 VZ_{1}	—	November 2, 2007	Socorro	LINEAR	·	1.3 km	MPC; JPL
320413	2007 VF_{2}	—	October 8, 2007	XuYi	PMO NEO Survey Program	·	1.3 km	MPC; JPL
320414	2007 VP_{2}	—	November 2, 2007	La Cañada	Lacruz, J.	EOS	2.1 km	MPC; JPL
320415	2007 VV_{10}	—	November 6, 2007	Mayhill	Lowe, A.	·	1.5 km	MPC; JPL
320416	2007 VU_{12}	—	November 1, 2007	Kitt Peak	Spacewatch	·	1.1 km	MPC; JPL
320417	2007 VE_{32}	—	November 2, 2007	Kitt Peak	Spacewatch	·	4.1 km	MPC; JPL
320418	2007 VO_{44}	—	November 1, 2007	Kitt Peak	Spacewatch	·	900 m	MPC; JPL
320419	2007 VR_{48}	—	November 1, 2007	Kitt Peak	Spacewatch	·	3.0 km	MPC; JPL
320420	2007 VL_{56}	—	November 1, 2007	Kitt Peak	Spacewatch	EOS	2.7 km	MPC; JPL
320421	2007 VH_{58}	—	November 1, 2007	Kitt Peak	Spacewatch	·	1.7 km	MPC; JPL
320422	2007 VN_{58}	—	November 1, 2007	Kitt Peak	Spacewatch	·	1.0 km	MPC; JPL
320423	2007 VA_{59}	—	November 1, 2007	Kitt Peak	Spacewatch	·	900 m	MPC; JPL
320424	2007 VC_{64}	—	November 1, 2007	Kitt Peak	Spacewatch	(2076)	1.1 km	MPC; JPL
320425	2007 VO_{66}	—	November 2, 2007	Kitt Peak	Spacewatch	·	850 m	MPC; JPL
320426	2007 VJ_{86}	—	November 2, 2007	Socorro	LINEAR	·	2.6 km	MPC; JPL
320427	2007 VA_{88}	—	November 2, 2007	Socorro	LINEAR	·	1.3 km	MPC; JPL
320428	2007 VP_{89}	—	November 4, 2007	Socorro	LINEAR	·	1.1 km	MPC; JPL
320429	2007 VN_{91}	—	November 5, 2007	Kitami	K. Endate	·	890 m	MPC; JPL
320430	2007 VW_{91}	—	November 7, 2007	Eskridge	G. Hug	·	4.4 km	MPC; JPL
320431	2007 VE_{94}	—	November 7, 2007	Bisei SG Center	BATTeRS	·	940 m	MPC; JPL
320432	2007 VP_{96}	—	November 1, 2007	Kitt Peak	Spacewatch	·	1.4 km	MPC; JPL
320433	2007 VF_{99}	—	November 2, 2007	Mount Lemmon	Mount Lemmon Survey	·	810 m	MPC; JPL
320434	2007 VF_{105}	—	November 3, 2007	Kitt Peak	Spacewatch	·	1.8 km	MPC; JPL
320435	2007 VL_{110}	—	November 3, 2007	Kitt Peak	Spacewatch	V	670 m	MPC; JPL
320436	2007 VX_{114}	—	November 3, 2007	Kitt Peak	Spacewatch	·	810 m	MPC; JPL
320437	2007 VM_{115}	—	November 3, 2007	Kitt Peak	Spacewatch	NYS	1.1 km	MPC; JPL
320438	2007 VY_{141}	—	November 4, 2007	Kitt Peak	Spacewatch	·	1.0 km	MPC; JPL
320439	2007 VO_{145}	—	November 4, 2007	Kitt Peak	Spacewatch	·	800 m	MPC; JPL
320440	2007 VX_{150}	—	November 7, 2007	Kitt Peak	Spacewatch	·	890 m	MPC; JPL
320441	2007 VN_{151}	—	November 7, 2007	Mount Lemmon	Mount Lemmon Survey	·	1.5 km	MPC; JPL
320442	2007 VW_{165}	—	November 5, 2007	Kitt Peak	Spacewatch	·	3.0 km	MPC; JPL
320443	2007 VQ_{188}	—	November 11, 2007	Bisei SG Center	BATTeRS	·	900 m	MPC; JPL
320444	2007 VS_{190}	—	November 8, 2007	Kitt Peak	Spacewatch	·	920 m	MPC; JPL
320445	2007 VA_{192}	—	November 4, 2007	Mount Lemmon	Mount Lemmon Survey	NYS	1.2 km	MPC; JPL
320446	2007 VS_{192}	—	November 4, 2007	Mount Lemmon	Mount Lemmon Survey	THM	2.4 km	MPC; JPL
320447	2007 VU_{194}	—	November 5, 2007	Mount Lemmon	Mount Lemmon Survey	·	1.1 km	MPC; JPL
320448	2007 VX_{194}	—	November 5, 2007	Mount Lemmon	Mount Lemmon Survey	·	1.0 km	MPC; JPL
320449	2007 VN_{198}	—	November 8, 2007	Mount Lemmon	Mount Lemmon Survey	·	3.8 km	MPC; JPL
320450	2007 VT_{200}	—	November 9, 2007	Mount Lemmon	Mount Lemmon Survey	ERI	1.7 km	MPC; JPL
320451	2007 VU_{206}	—	November 9, 2007	Catalina	CSS	V	690 m	MPC; JPL
320452	2007 VV_{210}	—	November 9, 2007	Kitt Peak	Spacewatch	·	1.9 km	MPC; JPL
320453	2007 VT_{211}	—	November 9, 2007	Kitt Peak	Spacewatch	·	760 m	MPC; JPL
320454	2007 VS_{217}	—	November 9, 2007	Kitt Peak	Spacewatch	·	760 m	MPC; JPL
320455	2007 VZ_{221}	—	November 13, 2007	Kitt Peak	Spacewatch	·	2.5 km	MPC; JPL
320456	2007 VN_{228}	—	November 12, 2007	Mount Lemmon	Mount Lemmon Survey	·	1.7 km	MPC; JPL
320457	2007 VD_{229}	—	November 7, 2007	Kitt Peak	Spacewatch	·	1.3 km	MPC; JPL
320458	2007 VU_{231}	—	November 7, 2007	Kitt Peak	Spacewatch	·	850 m	MPC; JPL
320459	2007 VP_{234}	—	November 9, 2007	Kitt Peak	Spacewatch	·	830 m	MPC; JPL
320460	2007 VE_{236}	—	November 11, 2007	Mount Lemmon	Mount Lemmon Survey	·	660 m	MPC; JPL
320461	2007 VG_{245}	—	November 14, 2007	Bisei SG Center	BATTeRS	NYS	1.2 km	MPC; JPL
320462	2007 VM_{249}	—	March 21, 1999	Apache Point	SDSS	·	790 m	MPC; JPL
320463	2007 VN_{265}	—	November 13, 2007	Kitt Peak	Spacewatch	·	810 m	MPC; JPL
320464	2007 VY_{268}	—	November 12, 2007	Socorro	LINEAR	·	950 m	MPC; JPL
320465	2007 VF_{276}	—	November 13, 2007	Mount Lemmon	Mount Lemmon Survey	·	1.5 km	MPC; JPL
320466	2007 VR_{280}	—	November 14, 2007	Kitt Peak	Spacewatch	·	630 m	MPC; JPL
320467	2007 VM_{281}	—	November 14, 2007	Kitt Peak	Spacewatch	NYS	1.0 km	MPC; JPL
320468	2007 VV_{282}	—	November 14, 2007	Kitt Peak	Spacewatch	V	720 m	MPC; JPL
320469	2007 VK_{284}	—	November 14, 2007	Kitt Peak	Spacewatch	·	690 m	MPC; JPL
320470	2007 VC_{292}	—	November 14, 2007	Kitt Peak	Spacewatch	·	2.9 km	MPC; JPL
320471	2007 VO_{292}	—	November 14, 2007	Kitt Peak	Spacewatch	·	1.1 km	MPC; JPL
320472	2007 VD_{294}	—	November 13, 2007	Kitt Peak	Spacewatch	·	670 m	MPC; JPL
320473	2007 VD_{306}	—	November 9, 2007	Mount Lemmon	Mount Lemmon Survey	CYB	4.6 km	MPC; JPL
320474	2007 VP_{306}	—	November 1, 2007	Kitt Peak	Spacewatch	·	860 m	MPC; JPL
320475	2007 VT_{316}	—	November 7, 2007	Kitt Peak	Spacewatch	·	870 m	MPC; JPL
320476	2007 VP_{317}	—	November 14, 2007	Kitt Peak	Spacewatch	·	1.2 km	MPC; JPL
320477	2007 VW_{319}	—	November 2, 2007	Socorro	LINEAR	·	5.8 km	MPC; JPL
320478	2007 VC_{320}	—	November 3, 2007	Socorro	LINEAR	·	930 m	MPC; JPL
320479	2007 VT_{323}	—	November 4, 2007	Socorro	LINEAR	·	820 m	MPC; JPL
320480	2007 VE_{324}	—	September 17, 2003	Kitt Peak	Spacewatch	·	1.1 km	MPC; JPL
320481	2007 VX_{324}	—	November 8, 2007	Mount Lemmon	Mount Lemmon Survey	·	1.5 km	MPC; JPL
320482	2007 VO_{328}	—	November 9, 2007	Socorro	LINEAR	·	830 m	MPC; JPL
320483	2007 VF_{329}	—	November 13, 2007	Catalina	CSS	·	680 m	MPC; JPL
320484	2007 VC_{331}	—	November 5, 2007	Mount Lemmon	Mount Lemmon Survey	·	2.3 km	MPC; JPL
320485	2007 VO_{332}	—	November 8, 2007	Socorro	LINEAR	·	1.1 km	MPC; JPL
320486	2007 VQ_{332}	—	November 8, 2007	Catalina	CSS	·	1.5 km	MPC; JPL
320487	2007 VM_{333}	—	November 11, 2007	Socorro	LINEAR	·	810 m	MPC; JPL
320488	2007 VF_{335}	—	November 15, 2007	Socorro	LINEAR	V	1.1 km	MPC; JPL
320489	2007 WG_{4}	—	November 18, 2007	Bisei SG Center	BATTeRS	·	720 m	MPC; JPL
320490	2007 WB_{7}	—	October 14, 2007	Mount Lemmon	Mount Lemmon Survey	·	1.2 km	MPC; JPL
320491	2007 WD_{12}	—	November 17, 2007	Catalina	CSS	·	990 m	MPC; JPL
320492	2007 WR_{15}	—	November 18, 2007	Mount Lemmon	Mount Lemmon Survey	·	870 m	MPC; JPL
320493	2007 WE_{16}	—	November 18, 2007	Mount Lemmon	Mount Lemmon Survey	·	860 m	MPC; JPL
320494	2007 WN_{16}	—	November 18, 2007	Mount Lemmon	Mount Lemmon Survey	·	3.2 km	MPC; JPL
320495	2007 WL_{23}	—	November 18, 2007	Mount Lemmon	Mount Lemmon Survey	KOR	1.4 km	MPC; JPL
320496	2007 WL_{42}	—	November 18, 2007	Mount Lemmon	Mount Lemmon Survey	MAS	560 m	MPC; JPL
320497	2007 WB_{45}	—	November 20, 2007	Mount Lemmon	Mount Lemmon Survey	·	1.0 km	MPC; JPL
320498	2007 WX_{48}	—	November 20, 2007	Mount Lemmon	Mount Lemmon Survey	AGN	1.3 km	MPC; JPL
320499	2007 WR_{63}	—	November 21, 2007	Mount Lemmon	Mount Lemmon Survey	·	1.0 km	MPC; JPL
320500	2007 XG_{5}	—	December 4, 2007	Kitt Peak	Spacewatch	·	2.5 km	MPC; JPL

== 320501–320600 ==
back to top

Designation			Discovery			Properties		Ref
Permanent	Provisional	Named after	Date	Site	Discoverer(s)	Category	Diam.	Ref
320501	2007 XQ_{6}	—	December 4, 2007	Catalina	CSS	·	1.0 km	MPC; JPL
320502	2007 XE_{14}	—	December 5, 2007	Catalina	CSS	EOS	3.1 km	MPC; JPL
320503	2007 XO_{17}	—	December 9, 2007	Bisei SG Center	BATTeRS	NYS	960 m	MPC; JPL
320504	2007 XS_{20}	—	December 12, 2007	La Sagra	OAM	·	1.1 km	MPC; JPL
320505	2007 XE_{22}	—	December 10, 2007	Socorro	LINEAR	·	890 m	MPC; JPL
320506	2007 XN_{22}	—	December 10, 2007	Socorro	LINEAR	·	1.1 km	MPC; JPL
320507	2007 XJ_{39}	—	November 14, 2007	Mount Lemmon	Mount Lemmon Survey	·	940 m	MPC; JPL
320508	2007 XX_{45}	—	December 15, 2007	Catalina	CSS	EMA	5.1 km	MPC; JPL
320509	2007 XA_{46}	—	December 15, 2007	Catalina	CSS	PHO	3.0 km	MPC; JPL
320510	2007 XN_{51}	—	December 4, 2007	Mount Lemmon	Mount Lemmon Survey	MAS	630 m	MPC; JPL
320511	2007 XU_{54}	—	December 4, 2007	Kitt Peak	Spacewatch	·	1.6 km	MPC; JPL
320512	2007 XB_{56}	—	December 4, 2007	Mount Lemmon	Mount Lemmon Survey	·	1.6 km	MPC; JPL
320513	2007 XU_{57}	—	December 4, 2007	Mount Lemmon	Mount Lemmon Survey	NYS	1.4 km	MPC; JPL
320514	2007 XM_{58}	—	December 5, 2007	Kitt Peak	Spacewatch	·	920 m	MPC; JPL
320515	2007 YA_{3}	—	December 18, 2007	Bergisch Gladbach	W. Bickel	·	1.2 km	MPC; JPL
320516	2007 YP_{3}	—	December 16, 2007	Junk Bond	D. Healy	·	950 m	MPC; JPL
320517	2007 YT_{8}	—	December 5, 2007	Kitt Peak	Spacewatch	·	1.6 km	MPC; JPL
320518	2007 YS_{18}	—	December 16, 2007	Kitt Peak	Spacewatch	·	1.1 km	MPC; JPL
320519	2007 YO_{22}	—	December 16, 2007	Kitt Peak	Spacewatch	·	1.2 km	MPC; JPL
320520	2007 YZ_{27}	—	December 18, 2007	Kitt Peak		·	1.1 km	MPC; JPL
320521	2007 YM_{30}	—	December 28, 2007	Kitt Peak	Spacewatch	·	1.1 km	MPC; JPL
320522	2007 YH_{37}	—	December 30, 2007	Mount Lemmon	Mount Lemmon Survey	NYS	1.1 km	MPC; JPL
320523	2007 YY_{38}	—	December 30, 2007	Mount Lemmon	Mount Lemmon Survey	·	1.1 km	MPC; JPL
320524	2007 YZ_{40}	—	December 30, 2007	Catalina	CSS	PHO	1.1 km	MPC; JPL
320525	2007 YG_{41}	—	December 30, 2007	Catalina	CSS	·	1.5 km	MPC; JPL
320526	2007 YW_{41}	—	December 30, 2007	Kitt Peak	Spacewatch	·	3.3 km	MPC; JPL
320527	2007 YX_{43}	—	December 30, 2007	Kitt Peak	Spacewatch	MAS	700 m	MPC; JPL
320528	2007 YZ_{45}	—	December 30, 2007	Mount Lemmon	Mount Lemmon Survey	NYS	1.1 km	MPC; JPL
320529	2007 YO_{52}	—	December 30, 2007	Catalina	CSS	·	1.7 km	MPC; JPL
320530	2007 YX_{58}	—	December 31, 2007	Kitt Peak	Spacewatch	·	1.4 km	MPC; JPL
320531	2007 YX_{61}	—	December 31, 2007	Mount Lemmon	Mount Lemmon Survey	·	920 m	MPC; JPL
320532	2007 YS_{62}	—	December 30, 2007	Kitt Peak	Spacewatch	·	1.1 km	MPC; JPL
320533	2007 YY_{63}	—	December 31, 2007	Kitt Peak	Spacewatch	·	1.4 km	MPC; JPL
320534	2007 YU_{64}	—	December 20, 2007	Mount Lemmon	Mount Lemmon Survey	MAS	810 m	MPC; JPL
320535	2007 YY_{65}	—	December 30, 2007	Kitt Peak	Spacewatch	MAS	860 m	MPC; JPL
320536	2007 YA_{67}	—	December 31, 2007	Mount Lemmon	Mount Lemmon Survey	·	1.5 km	MPC; JPL
320537	2007 YC_{69}	—	December 18, 2007	Mount Lemmon	Mount Lemmon Survey	·	1.5 km	MPC; JPL
320538	2007 YY_{70}	—	December 16, 2007	Socorro	LINEAR	·	1.1 km	MPC; JPL
320539	2007 YQ_{71}	—	December 17, 2007	Mount Lemmon	Mount Lemmon Survey	·	1.8 km	MPC; JPL
320540	2008 AN_{2}	—	January 6, 2008	La Sagra	OAM	·	4.3 km	MPC; JPL
320541 Asiaa	2008 AD_{3}	Asiaa	January 7, 2008	Lulin	C.-Y. Shih, Q. Ye	·	1.8 km	MPC; JPL
320542	2008 AK_{10}	—	January 10, 2008	Mount Lemmon	Mount Lemmon Survey	·	1.3 km	MPC; JPL
320543	2008 AY_{14}	—	January 10, 2008	Kitt Peak	Spacewatch	·	1.9 km	MPC; JPL
320544	2008 AJ_{15}	—	January 10, 2008	Kitt Peak	Spacewatch	NYS	990 m	MPC; JPL
320545	2008 AC_{16}	—	January 10, 2008	Mount Lemmon	Mount Lemmon Survey	·	1.2 km	MPC; JPL
320546	2008 AC_{17}	—	January 10, 2008	Kitt Peak	Spacewatch	·	1.5 km	MPC; JPL
320547	2008 AL_{19}	—	January 10, 2008	Mount Lemmon	Mount Lemmon Survey	·	2.1 km	MPC; JPL
320548	2008 AR_{30}	—	January 11, 2008	Desert Eagle	W. K. Y. Yeung	·	1.1 km	MPC; JPL
320549	2008 AD_{34}	—	January 10, 2008	Kitt Peak	Spacewatch	V	800 m	MPC; JPL
320550	2008 AL_{36}	—	January 10, 2008	Kitt Peak	Spacewatch	V	850 m	MPC; JPL
320551	2008 AL_{38}	—	January 10, 2008	Mount Lemmon	Mount Lemmon Survey	·	1.0 km	MPC; JPL
320552	2008 AE_{39}	—	January 10, 2008	Kitt Peak	Spacewatch	·	1.3 km	MPC; JPL
320553	2008 AD_{41}	—	January 10, 2008	Mount Lemmon	Mount Lemmon Survey	·	1.5 km	MPC; JPL
320554	2008 AH_{42}	—	January 10, 2008	Mount Lemmon	Mount Lemmon Survey	MAS	1.1 km	MPC; JPL
320555	2008 AM_{42}	—	January 10, 2008	Catalina	CSS	·	1.7 km	MPC; JPL
320556	2008 AC_{45}	—	January 10, 2008	Kitt Peak	Spacewatch	L5	14 km	MPC; JPL
320557	2008 AQ_{49}	—	January 11, 2008	Kitt Peak	Spacewatch	·	1.6 km	MPC; JPL
320558	2008 AV_{58}	—	January 11, 2008	Kitt Peak	Spacewatch	·	2.1 km	MPC; JPL
320559	2008 AG_{59}	—	January 11, 2008	Kitt Peak	Spacewatch	·	1.2 km	MPC; JPL
320560	2008 AO_{64}	—	January 11, 2008	Mount Lemmon	Mount Lemmon Survey	·	1.2 km	MPC; JPL
320561	2008 AJ_{68}	—	January 11, 2008	Kitt Peak	Spacewatch	·	1.3 km	MPC; JPL
320562	2008 AE_{74}	—	January 10, 2008	Kitt Peak	Spacewatch	MAS	840 m	MPC; JPL
320563	2008 AT_{78}	—	January 12, 2008	Kitt Peak	Spacewatch	MAS	830 m	MPC; JPL
320564	2008 AG_{82}	—	January 14, 2008	Kitt Peak	Spacewatch	·	1.6 km	MPC; JPL
320565	2008 AF_{83}	—	January 15, 2008	Mount Lemmon	Mount Lemmon Survey	MAR	1.4 km	MPC; JPL
320566	2008 AO_{86}	—	February 18, 2001	Kitt Peak	Spacewatch	·	1.5 km	MPC; JPL
320567	2008 AL_{87}	—	January 12, 2008	Kitt Peak	Spacewatch	V	810 m	MPC; JPL
320568	2008 AT_{91}	—	January 13, 2008	Kitt Peak	Spacewatch	·	1.7 km	MPC; JPL
320569	2008 AX_{92}	—	January 14, 2008	Kitt Peak	Spacewatch	NYS	1.3 km	MPC; JPL
320570	2008 AP_{98}	—	January 14, 2008	Kitt Peak	Spacewatch	·	1.5 km	MPC; JPL
320571	2008 AO_{103}	—	January 15, 2008	Mount Lemmon	Mount Lemmon Survey	·	1.2 km	MPC; JPL
320572	2008 AB_{104}	—	January 15, 2008	Mount Lemmon	Mount Lemmon Survey	MAS	710 m	MPC; JPL
320573	2008 AL_{104}	—	January 1, 2008	Kitt Peak	Spacewatch	·	890 m	MPC; JPL
320574	2008 AP_{105}	—	January 15, 2008	Mount Lemmon	Mount Lemmon Survey	·	1.2 km	MPC; JPL
320575	2008 AM_{110}	—	January 15, 2008	Kitt Peak	Spacewatch	CLA	2.7 km	MPC; JPL
320576	2008 AA_{112}	—	January 15, 2008	Kitt Peak	Spacewatch	·	950 m	MPC; JPL
320577	2008 AP_{115}	—	January 10, 2008	Kitt Peak	Spacewatch	MAS	800 m	MPC; JPL
320578	2008 AU_{115}	—	January 11, 2008	Kitt Peak	Spacewatch	·	1.7 km	MPC; JPL
320579	2008 AV_{126}	—	January 11, 2008	Kitt Peak	Spacewatch	·	950 m	MPC; JPL
320580	2008 AZ_{128}	—	November 7, 2007	Mount Lemmon	Mount Lemmon Survey	·	1.5 km	MPC; JPL
320581	2008 AX_{134}	—	January 10, 2008	Catalina	CSS	·	3.6 km	MPC; JPL
320582	2008 AW_{136}	—	January 13, 2008	Kitt Peak	Spacewatch	·	1.4 km	MPC; JPL
320583	2008 BE_{3}	—	January 16, 2008	Kitt Peak	Spacewatch	(5)	1.8 km	MPC; JPL
320584	2008 BO_{10}	—	January 17, 2008	Mount Lemmon	Mount Lemmon Survey	·	1.3 km	MPC; JPL
320585	2008 BN_{12}	—	January 18, 2008	Mount Lemmon	Mount Lemmon Survey	·	1.7 km	MPC; JPL
320586	2008 BS_{18}	—	January 30, 2008	La Sagra	OAM	·	1.3 km	MPC; JPL
320587	2008 BW_{18}	—	January 29, 2008	La Sagra	OAM	·	1.4 km	MPC; JPL
320588	2008 BE_{20}	—	January 30, 2008	Catalina	CSS	V	760 m	MPC; JPL
320589	2008 BN_{20}	—	January 30, 2008	Catalina	CSS	·	1.5 km	MPC; JPL
320590	2008 BE_{21}	—	January 30, 2008	Mount Lemmon	Mount Lemmon Survey	·	2.0 km	MPC; JPL
320591	2008 BD_{25}	—	January 30, 2008	Eskridge	G. Hug	MAS	930 m	MPC; JPL
320592	2008 BT_{29}	—	January 30, 2008	Catalina	CSS	·	1.2 km	MPC; JPL
320593	2008 BF_{30}	—	January 30, 2008	Mount Lemmon	Mount Lemmon Survey	KOR	1.4 km	MPC; JPL
320594	2008 BG_{33}	—	October 11, 2006	Palomar	NEAT	·	1.9 km	MPC; JPL
320595	2008 BX_{33}	—	January 30, 2008	Catalina	CSS	NYS	1.6 km	MPC; JPL
320596	2008 BD_{34}	—	January 30, 2008	Kitt Peak	Spacewatch	·	1.9 km	MPC; JPL
320597	2008 BY_{37}	—	January 31, 2008	Mount Lemmon	Mount Lemmon Survey	·	1.6 km	MPC; JPL
320598	2008 BO_{39}	—	January 30, 2008	Catalina	CSS	V	810 m	MPC; JPL
320599	2008 BQ_{40}	—	January 31, 2008	Socorro	LINEAR	·	1.5 km	MPC; JPL
320600	2008 BM_{41}	—	January 30, 2008	Catalina	CSS	NYS	1.7 km	MPC; JPL

== 320601–320700 ==
back to top

Designation			Discovery			Properties		Ref
Permanent	Provisional	Named after	Date	Site	Discoverer(s)	Category	Diam.	Ref
320601	2008 BP_{41}	—	January 30, 2008	Catalina	CSS	NYS	1.7 km	MPC; JPL
320602	2008 BA_{50}	—	January 16, 2008	Kitt Peak	Spacewatch	·	1.4 km	MPC; JPL
320603	2008 BH_{52}	—	January 19, 2008	Mount Lemmon	Mount Lemmon Survey	EUN	1.5 km	MPC; JPL
320604	2008 BO_{52}	—	January 27, 2008	Charleston	Astronomical Research Observatory	PHO	1.1 km	MPC; JPL
320605	2008 BC_{53}	—	January 18, 2008	Mount Lemmon	Mount Lemmon Survey	·	2.1 km	MPC; JPL
320606	2008 CM_{2}	—	February 1, 2008	Mount Lemmon	Mount Lemmon Survey	·	1.0 km	MPC; JPL
320607	2008 CT_{2}	—	February 1, 2008	Mount Lemmon	Mount Lemmon Survey	·	2.5 km	MPC; JPL
320608	2008 CU_{6}	—	February 1, 2008	Mount Lemmon	Mount Lemmon Survey	·	1.3 km	MPC; JPL
320609	2008 CW_{6}	—	February 1, 2008	Mount Lemmon	Mount Lemmon Survey	·	1.3 km	MPC; JPL
320610	2008 CM_{10}	—	February 2, 2008	Kitt Peak	Spacewatch	·	2.4 km	MPC; JPL
320611	2008 CT_{11}	—	February 3, 2008	Kitt Peak	Spacewatch	·	2.5 km	MPC; JPL
320612	2008 CM_{18}	—	February 3, 2008	Kitt Peak	Spacewatch	·	1.6 km	MPC; JPL
320613	2008 CW_{21}	—	February 9, 2008	Catalina	CSS	BAR	1.3 km	MPC; JPL
320614	2008 CL_{23}	—	February 1, 2008	Kitt Peak	Spacewatch	·	1.6 km	MPC; JPL
320615	2008 CE_{24}	—	February 1, 2008	Kitt Peak	Spacewatch	·	1.2 km	MPC; JPL
320616	2008 CV_{24}	—	February 1, 2008	Kitt Peak	Spacewatch	·	1.4 km	MPC; JPL
320617	2008 CH_{27}	—	February 2, 2008	Kitt Peak	Spacewatch	·	930 m	MPC; JPL
320618	2008 CN_{27}	—	February 2, 2008	Kitt Peak	Spacewatch	·	3.2 km	MPC; JPL
320619	2008 CJ_{32}	—	February 2, 2008	Kitt Peak	Spacewatch	·	1.4 km	MPC; JPL
320620	2008 CR_{33}	—	February 2, 2008	Kitt Peak	Spacewatch	·	1.2 km	MPC; JPL
320621	2008 CA_{34}	—	February 2, 2008	Kitt Peak	Spacewatch	NYS	1.2 km	MPC; JPL
320622	2008 CG_{34}	—	February 2, 2008	Kitt Peak	Spacewatch	·	1.1 km	MPC; JPL
320623	2008 CA_{40}	—	February 2, 2008	Mount Lemmon	Mount Lemmon Survey	NYS	1.3 km	MPC; JPL
320624	2008 CT_{40}	—	February 2, 2008	Kitt Peak	Spacewatch	·	1.5 km	MPC; JPL
320625	2008 CE_{42}	—	February 2, 2008	Kitt Peak	Spacewatch	EUN	1.1 km	MPC; JPL
320626	2008 CN_{45}	—	February 2, 2008	Kitt Peak	Spacewatch	·	1.2 km	MPC; JPL
320627	2008 CF_{49}	—	February 6, 2008	Anderson Mesa	LONEOS	CLA	2.4 km	MPC; JPL
320628	2008 CB_{69}	—	February 7, 2008	Pla D'Arguines	R. Ferrando	V	780 m	MPC; JPL
320629	2008 CS_{70}	—	February 9, 2008	Dauban	Kugel, F.	·	1.3 km	MPC; JPL
320630	2008 CQ_{74}	—	February 9, 2008	Dauban	Kugel, F.	·	1.4 km	MPC; JPL
320631	2008 CA_{75}	—	February 10, 2008	Bergisch Gladbach	W. Bickel	·	2.4 km	MPC; JPL
320632	2008 CT_{76}	—	February 6, 2008	Catalina	CSS	V	760 m	MPC; JPL
320633	2008 CR_{77}	—	February 6, 2008	Catalina	CSS	·	1.1 km	MPC; JPL
320634	2008 CF_{78}	—	February 7, 2008	Kitt Peak	Spacewatch	·	3.5 km	MPC; JPL
320635	2008 CG_{79}	—	February 7, 2008	Kitt Peak	Spacewatch	·	3.5 km	MPC; JPL
320636	2008 CR_{85}	—	February 7, 2008	Mount Lemmon	Mount Lemmon Survey	·	1.6 km	MPC; JPL
320637	2008 CM_{87}	—	February 7, 2008	Mount Lemmon	Mount Lemmon Survey	·	2.7 km	MPC; JPL
320638	2008 CU_{87}	—	February 7, 2008	Mount Lemmon	Mount Lemmon Survey	·	1.0 km	MPC; JPL
320639	2008 CZ_{87}	—	September 21, 2001	Socorro	LINEAR	·	2.5 km	MPC; JPL
320640	2008 CY_{89}	—	February 8, 2008	Kitt Peak	Spacewatch	V	610 m	MPC; JPL
320641	2008 CM_{92}	—	February 8, 2008	Kitt Peak	Spacewatch	NYS	1.4 km	MPC; JPL
320642	2008 CJ_{99}	—	February 9, 2008	Kitt Peak	Spacewatch	NYS	1.4 km	MPC; JPL
320643	2008 CO_{105}	—	February 9, 2008	Mount Lemmon	Mount Lemmon Survey	·	1.6 km	MPC; JPL
320644	2008 CK_{113}	—	February 10, 2008	Kitt Peak	Spacewatch	·	4.9 km	MPC; JPL
320645	2008 CA_{118}	—	February 12, 2008	Wildberg	R. Apitzsch	·	1.1 km	MPC; JPL
320646	2008 CL_{119}	—	February 9, 2008	Mayhill	Dillon, W. G.	·	1.4 km	MPC; JPL
320647	2008 CO_{126}	—	February 8, 2008	Kitt Peak	Spacewatch	·	1.5 km	MPC; JPL
320648	2008 CC_{127}	—	February 8, 2008	Kitt Peak	Spacewatch	NYS	1.3 km	MPC; JPL
320649	2008 CN_{127}	—	February 8, 2008	Kitt Peak	Spacewatch	·	1.6 km	MPC; JPL
320650	2008 CQ_{130}	—	February 8, 2008	Mount Lemmon	Mount Lemmon Survey	MAS	780 m	MPC; JPL
320651	2008 CW_{130}	—	February 8, 2008	Kitt Peak	Spacewatch	·	1.0 km	MPC; JPL
320652	2008 CV_{132}	—	February 8, 2008	Kitt Peak	Spacewatch	·	970 m	MPC; JPL
320653	2008 CD_{141}	—	May 24, 2001	Cerro Tololo	Deep Ecliptic Survey	·	3.3 km	MPC; JPL
320654	2008 CB_{142}	—	February 8, 2008	Kitt Peak	Spacewatch	·	1.4 km	MPC; JPL
320655	2008 CM_{145}	—	February 9, 2008	Kitt Peak	Spacewatch	·	1.5 km	MPC; JPL
320656	2008 CN_{145}	—	February 9, 2008	Kitt Peak	Spacewatch	·	1.3 km	MPC; JPL
320657	2008 CS_{152}	—	February 9, 2008	Mount Lemmon	Mount Lemmon Survey	·	1.5 km	MPC; JPL
320658	2008 CY_{152}	—	February 9, 2008	Catalina	CSS	·	1.3 km	MPC; JPL
320659	2008 CA_{154}	—	April 13, 2000	Kitt Peak	Spacewatch	·	1.6 km	MPC; JPL
320660	2008 CX_{159}	—	February 9, 2008	Kitt Peak	Spacewatch	·	1.6 km	MPC; JPL
320661	2008 CA_{163}	—	February 10, 2008	Kitt Peak	Spacewatch	·	3.0 km	MPC; JPL
320662	2008 CS_{165}	—	February 10, 2008	Kitt Peak	Spacewatch	·	1.8 km	MPC; JPL
320663	2008 CE_{171}	—	September 13, 2002	Palomar	NEAT	·	1.5 km	MPC; JPL
320664	2008 CS_{175}	—	February 6, 2008	Socorro	LINEAR	·	1.4 km	MPC; JPL
320665	2008 CM_{176}	—	February 7, 2008	Socorro	LINEAR	MAR	1.4 km	MPC; JPL
320666	2008 CB_{178}	—	February 6, 2008	Catalina	CSS	·	1.5 km	MPC; JPL
320667	2008 CE_{179}	—	February 6, 2008	Catalina	CSS	·	1.5 km	MPC; JPL
320668	2008 CS_{179}	—	February 7, 2008	Catalina	CSS	·	1.1 km	MPC; JPL
320669	2008 CZ_{179}	—	February 8, 2008	Catalina	CSS	·	1.5 km	MPC; JPL
320670	2008 CU_{183}	—	February 13, 2008	Catalina	CSS	·	1.3 km	MPC; JPL
320671	2008 CH_{188}	—	February 6, 2008	Catalina	CSS	·	1.7 km	MPC; JPL
320672	2008 CK_{188}	—	November 10, 1999	Kitt Peak	Spacewatch	·	1.2 km	MPC; JPL
320673	2008 CP_{193}	—	February 7, 2008	Mount Lemmon	Mount Lemmon Survey	·	2.4 km	MPC; JPL
320674	2008 CX_{193}	—	February 8, 2008	Mount Lemmon	Mount Lemmon Survey	·	2.1 km	MPC; JPL
320675	2008 CB_{194}	—	February 9, 2008	Mount Lemmon	Mount Lemmon Survey	·	2.3 km	MPC; JPL
320676	2008 CL_{194}	—	February 11, 2008	Mount Lemmon	Mount Lemmon Survey	RAF	1.1 km	MPC; JPL
320677	2008 CR_{197}	—	February 9, 2008	Kitt Peak	Spacewatch	(5)	940 m	MPC; JPL
320678	2008 CO_{201}	—	February 2, 2008	Kitt Peak	Spacewatch	·	1.5 km	MPC; JPL
320679	2008 CB_{205}	—	February 2, 2008	Mount Lemmon	Mount Lemmon Survey	NYS	1.2 km	MPC; JPL
320680	2008 CP_{205}	—	October 17, 2006	Catalina	CSS	·	2.0 km	MPC; JPL
320681	2008 CO_{209}	—	February 3, 2008	Catalina	CSS	·	1.8 km	MPC; JPL
320682	2008 CH_{210}	—	February 2, 2008	Kitt Peak	Spacewatch	·	1.2 km	MPC; JPL
320683	2008 CE_{211}	—	February 3, 2008	Catalina	CSS	GEF	1.5 km	MPC; JPL
320684	2008 CG_{211}	—	February 3, 2008	Kitt Peak	Spacewatch	·	1.9 km	MPC; JPL
320685	2008 CR_{211}	—	February 6, 2008	Socorro	LINEAR	·	1.7 km	MPC; JPL
320686	2008 CR_{213}	—	February 10, 2008	Kitt Peak	Spacewatch	·	1.1 km	MPC; JPL
320687	2008 CK_{214}	—	February 11, 2008	Mount Lemmon	Mount Lemmon Survey	·	1.3 km	MPC; JPL
320688	2008 CR_{214}	—	February 12, 2008	Mount Lemmon	Mount Lemmon Survey	·	1.4 km	MPC; JPL
320689	2008 CS_{214}	—	February 12, 2008	Mount Lemmon	Mount Lemmon Survey	(5)	1.7 km	MPC; JPL
320690	2008 CK_{215}	—	February 13, 2008	Socorro	LINEAR	MAR	1.2 km	MPC; JPL
320691	2008 CL_{215}	—	February 13, 2008	Socorro	LINEAR	·	1.6 km	MPC; JPL
320692	2008 DS	—	February 24, 2008	Junk Bond	D. Healy	·	1.3 km	MPC; JPL
320693	2008 DQ_{1}	—	February 24, 2008	Mount Lemmon	Mount Lemmon Survey	·	1.2 km	MPC; JPL
320694	2008 DF_{3}	—	February 24, 2008	Mount Lemmon	Mount Lemmon Survey	·	1.2 km	MPC; JPL
320695	2008 DY_{11}	—	February 26, 2008	Kitt Peak	Spacewatch	·	1.6 km	MPC; JPL
320696	2008 DX_{13}	—	February 26, 2008	Mount Lemmon	Mount Lemmon Survey	·	2.5 km	MPC; JPL
320697	2008 DQ_{14}	—	February 26, 2008	Mount Lemmon	Mount Lemmon Survey	MAS	790 m	MPC; JPL
320698	2008 DZ_{17}	—	February 26, 2008	Mount Lemmon	Mount Lemmon Survey	·	1.9 km	MPC; JPL
320699	2008 DT_{26}	—	February 28, 2008	Mount Lemmon	Mount Lemmon Survey	KOR	1.9 km	MPC; JPL
320700	2008 DD_{27}	—	February 29, 2008	Catalina	CSS	·	1.7 km	MPC; JPL

== 320701–320800 ==
back to top

Designation			Discovery			Properties		Ref
Permanent	Provisional	Named after	Date	Site	Discoverer(s)	Category	Diam.	Ref
320701	2008 DU_{29}	—	February 11, 2008	Kitt Peak	Spacewatch	·	1.5 km	MPC; JPL
320702	2008 DW_{32}	—	February 27, 2008	Kitt Peak	Spacewatch	·	2.3 km	MPC; JPL
320703	2008 DO_{35}	—	February 27, 2008	Kitt Peak	Spacewatch	EUN	1.5 km	MPC; JPL
320704	2008 DH_{36}	—	February 27, 2008	Mount Lemmon	Mount Lemmon Survey	HNS	1.7 km	MPC; JPL
320705	2008 DZ_{37}	—	February 27, 2008	Mount Lemmon	Mount Lemmon Survey	·	1.3 km	MPC; JPL
320706	2008 DT_{38}	—	February 27, 2008	Kitt Peak	Spacewatch	EUN	1.8 km	MPC; JPL
320707	2008 DG_{39}	—	February 27, 2008	Mount Lemmon	Mount Lemmon Survey	·	1.5 km	MPC; JPL
320708	2008 DG_{43}	—	February 28, 2008	Catalina	CSS	·	1.6 km	MPC; JPL
320709	2008 DD_{44}	—	February 28, 2008	Kitt Peak	Spacewatch	MAR	1.3 km	MPC; JPL
320710	2008 DR_{46}	—	February 28, 2008	Kitt Peak	Spacewatch	(5)	1.2 km	MPC; JPL
320711	2008 DP_{48}	—	January 10, 2008	Mount Lemmon	Mount Lemmon Survey	·	1.6 km	MPC; JPL
320712	2008 DP_{50}	—	February 29, 2008	Kitt Peak	Spacewatch	·	2.7 km	MPC; JPL
320713	2008 DR_{56}	—	February 28, 2008	Mount Lemmon	Mount Lemmon Survey	·	1.7 km	MPC; JPL
320714	2008 DO_{59}	—	February 27, 2008	Mount Lemmon	Mount Lemmon Survey	·	2.0 km	MPC; JPL
320715	2008 DC_{62}	—	February 28, 2008	Kitt Peak	Spacewatch	V	890 m	MPC; JPL
320716	2008 DS_{62}	—	February 28, 2008	Mount Lemmon	Mount Lemmon Survey	·	1.3 km	MPC; JPL
320717	2008 DY_{65}	—	February 28, 2008	Mount Lemmon	Mount Lemmon Survey	·	1.1 km	MPC; JPL
320718	2008 DE_{68}	—	December 24, 2006	Kitt Peak	Spacewatch	·	2.6 km	MPC; JPL
320719	2008 DT_{68}	—	February 29, 2008	Kitt Peak	Spacewatch	·	1.9 km	MPC; JPL
320720	2008 DN_{74}	—	February 28, 2008	Mount Lemmon	Mount Lemmon Survey	MAS	880 m	MPC; JPL
320721	2008 DE_{81}	—	February 27, 2008	Kitt Peak	Spacewatch	·	1.1 km	MPC; JPL
320722	2008 DD_{82}	—	February 28, 2008	Kitt Peak	Spacewatch	·	1.4 km	MPC; JPL
320723	2008 DM_{83}	—	February 29, 2008	Purple Mountain	PMO NEO Survey Program	·	880 m	MPC; JPL
320724	2008 DZ_{83}	—	February 29, 2008	Mount Lemmon	Mount Lemmon Survey	·	2.0 km	MPC; JPL
320725	2008 DU_{88}	—	February 27, 2008	Mount Lemmon	Mount Lemmon Survey	·	1.8 km	MPC; JPL
320726	2008 DV_{88}	—	February 27, 2008	Mount Lemmon	Mount Lemmon Survey	·	1.6 km	MPC; JPL
320727	2008 EH_{2}	—	March 1, 2008	Kitt Peak	Spacewatch	(5)	1.3 km	MPC; JPL
320728	2008 EW_{3}	—	January 8, 2002	Socorro	LINEAR	·	3.9 km	MPC; JPL
320729	2008 ER_{10}	—	March 1, 2008	Kitt Peak	Spacewatch	·	1.5 km	MPC; JPL
320730	2008 EO_{11}	—	March 1, 2008	Kitt Peak	Spacewatch	·	2.7 km	MPC; JPL
320731	2008 EK_{15}	—	March 1, 2008	Kitt Peak	Spacewatch	·	1.9 km	MPC; JPL
320732	2008 EO_{15}	—	March 1, 2008	Kitt Peak	Spacewatch	·	1.9 km	MPC; JPL
320733	2008 ER_{21}	—	March 2, 2008	Kitt Peak	Spacewatch	·	1.7 km	MPC; JPL
320734	2008 EB_{22}	—	March 2, 2008	Kitt Peak	Spacewatch	·	2.8 km	MPC; JPL
320735	2008 EP_{29}	—	March 4, 2008	Mount Lemmon	Mount Lemmon Survey	(5)	1.6 km	MPC; JPL
320736	2008 EX_{31}	—	March 5, 2008	Mount Lemmon	Mount Lemmon Survey	·	2.2 km	MPC; JPL
320737	2008 EL_{36}	—	March 3, 2008	Kitt Peak	Spacewatch	·	1.3 km	MPC; JPL
320738	2008 EN_{36}	—	March 3, 2008	Kitt Peak	Spacewatch	HNS	1.4 km	MPC; JPL
320739	2008 EA_{37}	—	March 4, 2008	Kitt Peak	Spacewatch	·	1.2 km	MPC; JPL
320740	2008 EC_{40}	—	March 4, 2008	Kitt Peak	Spacewatch	·	1.5 km	MPC; JPL
320741	2008 ED_{41}	—	March 4, 2008	Kitt Peak	Spacewatch	·	2.3 km	MPC; JPL
320742	2008 EX_{41}	—	March 4, 2008	Kitt Peak	Spacewatch	·	1.9 km	MPC; JPL
320743	2008 EY_{44}	—	March 5, 2008	Kitt Peak	Spacewatch	·	1.7 km	MPC; JPL
320744	2008 EN_{47}	—	March 5, 2008	Mount Lemmon	Mount Lemmon Survey	·	1.9 km	MPC; JPL
320745	2008 EF_{48}	—	March 5, 2008	Kitt Peak	Spacewatch	·	2.1 km	MPC; JPL
320746	2008 EN_{51}	—	March 6, 2008	Kitt Peak	Spacewatch	·	2.3 km	MPC; JPL
320747	2008 EQ_{52}	—	March 6, 2008	Kitt Peak	Spacewatch	·	2.7 km	MPC; JPL
320748	2008 EB_{54}	—	March 6, 2008	Mount Lemmon	Mount Lemmon Survey	·	2.0 km	MPC; JPL
320749	2008 EY_{54}	—	March 6, 2008	Kitt Peak	Spacewatch	·	1.8 km	MPC; JPL
320750	2008 EL_{59}	—	March 8, 2008	Mount Lemmon	Mount Lemmon Survey	·	1.3 km	MPC; JPL
320751	2008 EG_{60}	—	March 8, 2008	Catalina	CSS	·	1.2 km	MPC; JPL
320752	2008 ED_{63}	—	March 9, 2008	Mount Lemmon	Mount Lemmon Survey	·	890 m	MPC; JPL
320753	2008 EK_{65}	—	March 9, 2008	Mount Lemmon	Mount Lemmon Survey	·	1.6 km	MPC; JPL
320754	2008 EN_{66}	—	March 9, 2008	Mount Lemmon	Mount Lemmon Survey	·	1.2 km	MPC; JPL
320755	2008 EH_{67}	—	March 9, 2008	Mount Lemmon	Mount Lemmon Survey	·	1.8 km	MPC; JPL
320756	2008 EZ_{68}	—	March 11, 2008	Mount Lemmon	Mount Lemmon Survey	T_{j} (2.99) · EUP	6.8 km	MPC; JPL
320757	2008 EQ_{69}	—	March 8, 2008	Mount Lemmon	Mount Lemmon Survey	·	1.3 km	MPC; JPL
320758	2008 EW_{74}	—	March 7, 2008	Kitt Peak	Spacewatch	·	2.1 km	MPC; JPL
320759	2008 EC_{75}	—	March 7, 2008	Kitt Peak	Spacewatch	(5)	2.8 km	MPC; JPL
320760	2008 EO_{75}	—	March 7, 2008	Kitt Peak	Spacewatch	·	1.3 km	MPC; JPL
320761	2008 EB_{76}	—	March 7, 2008	Kitt Peak	Spacewatch	·	1.4 km	MPC; JPL
320762	2008 EV_{81}	—	March 4, 2008	Socorro	LINEAR	·	1.7 km	MPC; JPL
320763	2008 EM_{82}	—	March 8, 2008	Socorro	LINEAR	BRG	1.6 km	MPC; JPL
320764	2008 EA_{86}	—	March 7, 2008	Catalina	CSS	·	930 m	MPC; JPL
320765	2008 EW_{86}	—	March 7, 2008	Kitt Peak	Spacewatch	ADE	2.7 km	MPC; JPL
320766	2008 EL_{92}	—	March 3, 2008	Catalina	CSS	·	2.2 km	MPC; JPL
320767	2008 EP_{92}	—	March 3, 2008	Catalina	CSS	TIN	1.5 km	MPC; JPL
320768	2008 EE_{95}	—	March 5, 2008	Mount Lemmon	Mount Lemmon Survey	MRX	1.2 km	MPC; JPL
320769	2008 EJ_{96}	—	March 6, 2008	Mount Lemmon	Mount Lemmon Survey	·	1.2 km	MPC; JPL
320770	2008 EY_{96}	—	March 7, 2008	Mount Lemmon	Mount Lemmon Survey	V	920 m	MPC; JPL
320771	2008 EL_{107}	—	March 6, 2008	Mount Lemmon	Mount Lemmon Survey	NEM	2.9 km	MPC; JPL
320772	2008 EG_{114}	—	March 8, 2008	Kitt Peak	Spacewatch	(1547)	2.3 km	MPC; JPL
320773	2008 EE_{118}	—	March 9, 2008	Mount Lemmon	Mount Lemmon Survey	NYS	1.4 km	MPC; JPL
320774	2008 EH_{118}	—	July 6, 2005	Kitt Peak	Spacewatch	·	1.2 km	MPC; JPL
320775	2008 EN_{120}	—	March 9, 2008	Kitt Peak	Spacewatch	·	2.4 km	MPC; JPL
320776	2008 EY_{120}	—	March 9, 2008	Kitt Peak	Spacewatch	·	1.2 km	MPC; JPL
320777	2008 EZ_{120}	—	March 9, 2008	Kitt Peak	Spacewatch	·	1.5 km	MPC; JPL
320778	2008 EQ_{121}	—	March 9, 2008	Kitt Peak	Spacewatch	·	2.2 km	MPC; JPL
320779	2008 ES_{122}	—	February 29, 2008	Kitt Peak	Spacewatch	·	2.7 km	MPC; JPL
320780	2008 EQ_{128}	—	March 11, 2008	Kitt Peak	Spacewatch	·	2.8 km	MPC; JPL
320781	2008 EM_{130}	—	March 11, 2008	Kitt Peak	Spacewatch	·	2.1 km	MPC; JPL
320782	2008 EX_{130}	—	March 11, 2008	Kitt Peak	Spacewatch	·	1 km	MPC; JPL
320783	2008 EJ_{134}	—	March 11, 2008	Kitt Peak	Spacewatch	HOF	2.4 km	MPC; JPL
320784	2008 EL_{137}	—	March 11, 2008	Kitt Peak	Spacewatch	·	1.7 km	MPC; JPL
320785	2008 ED_{140}	—	March 12, 2008	Kitt Peak	Spacewatch	·	1.1 km	MPC; JPL
320786	2008 EF_{140}	—	March 12, 2008	Kitt Peak	Spacewatch	NYS	1.5 km	MPC; JPL
320787	2008 EH_{140}	—	March 12, 2008	Kitt Peak	Spacewatch	·	1.3 km	MPC; JPL
320788	2008 EX_{140}	—	March 12, 2008	Kitt Peak	Spacewatch	·	2.6 km	MPC; JPL
320789	2008 EN_{141}	—	March 12, 2008	Kitt Peak	Spacewatch	·	1.8 km	MPC; JPL
320790 Anestin	2008 EN_{145}	Anestin	March 12, 2008	La Silla	EURONEAR	(194)	1.5 km	MPC; JPL
320791	2008 ER_{146}	—	March 5, 2008	Mount Lemmon	Mount Lemmon Survey	·	1.4 km	MPC; JPL
320792	2008 EL_{148}	—	March 2, 2008	Kitt Peak	Spacewatch	·	1.2 km	MPC; JPL
320793	2008 EZ_{148}	—	March 2, 2008	Mount Lemmon	Mount Lemmon Survey	·	1.4 km	MPC; JPL
320794	2008 EH_{152}	—	March 10, 2008	Kitt Peak	Spacewatch	·	2.5 km	MPC; JPL
320795	2008 EL_{153}	—	March 12, 2008	La Silla	La Silla	·	2.2 km	MPC; JPL
320796	2008 EU_{153}	—	March 13, 2008	Catalina	CSS	·	2.0 km	MPC; JPL
320797	2008 EX_{153}	—	March 13, 2008	Kitt Peak	Spacewatch	·	2.1 km	MPC; JPL
320798	2008 EO_{158}	—	October 3, 2005	Catalina	CSS	·	3.3 km	MPC; JPL
320799	2008 EC_{159}	—	March 15, 2008	Mount Lemmon	Mount Lemmon Survey	·	1.3 km	MPC; JPL
320800	2008 EZ_{160}	—	November 12, 2001	Apache Point	SDSS	L5	9.7 km	MPC; JPL

== 320801–320900 ==
back to top

Designation			Discovery			Properties		Ref
Permanent	Provisional	Named after	Date	Site	Discoverer(s)	Category	Diam.	Ref
320801	2008 EF_{161}	—	March 8, 2008	Kitt Peak	Spacewatch	HOF	2.4 km	MPC; JPL
320802	2008 EC_{162}	—	March 11, 2008	Kitt Peak	Spacewatch	·	1.8 km	MPC; JPL
320803	2008 EK_{162}	—	September 11, 2005	Kitt Peak	Spacewatch	·	1.6 km	MPC; JPL
320804	2008 EW_{163}	—	March 10, 2008	Socorro	LINEAR	V	1.1 km	MPC; JPL
320805	2008 EZ_{165}	—	March 4, 2008	Mount Lemmon	Mount Lemmon Survey	·	2.1 km	MPC; JPL
320806	2008 EB_{166}	—	March 4, 2008	Mount Lemmon	Mount Lemmon Survey	·	2.1 km	MPC; JPL
320807	2008 EH_{166}	—	March 5, 2008	Mount Lemmon	Mount Lemmon Survey	·	1.6 km	MPC; JPL
320808	2008 EK_{166}	—	March 6, 2008	Kitt Peak	Spacewatch	(12739)	1.6 km	MPC; JPL
320809	2008 EK_{167}	—	March 8, 2008	Socorro	LINEAR	·	2.1 km	MPC; JPL
320810	2008 FM_{5}	—	March 27, 2008	Great Shefford	Birtwhistle, P.	·	1.3 km	MPC; JPL
320811	2008 FO_{9}	—	March 26, 2008	Kitt Peak	Spacewatch	·	1.3 km	MPC; JPL
320812	2008 FC_{11}	—	March 26, 2008	Kitt Peak	Spacewatch	·	1.7 km	MPC; JPL
320813	2008 FW_{12}	—	March 26, 2008	Mount Lemmon	Mount Lemmon Survey	·	1.8 km	MPC; JPL
320814	2008 FU_{13}	—	March 26, 2008	Mount Lemmon	Mount Lemmon Survey	·	2.2 km	MPC; JPL
320815	2008 FZ_{13}	—	March 26, 2008	Mount Lemmon	Mount Lemmon Survey	·	880 m	MPC; JPL
320816	2008 FZ_{14}	—	March 26, 2008	Kitt Peak	Spacewatch	EUN	1.7 km	MPC; JPL
320817	2008 FD_{23}	—	March 27, 2008	Kitt Peak	Spacewatch	·	2.0 km	MPC; JPL
320818	2008 FE_{24}	—	March 27, 2008	Kitt Peak	Spacewatch	·	1.9 km	MPC; JPL
320819	2008 FM_{24}	—	March 5, 2008	Mount Lemmon	Mount Lemmon Survey	·	2.2 km	MPC; JPL
320820	2008 FO_{25}	—	March 27, 2008	Kitt Peak	Spacewatch	NYS	1.3 km	MPC; JPL
320821	2008 FO_{26}	—	March 27, 2008	Kitt Peak	Spacewatch	·	2.6 km	MPC; JPL
320822	2008 FH_{27}	—	March 27, 2008	Kitt Peak	Spacewatch	·	2.0 km	MPC; JPL
320823	2008 FA_{29}	—	March 28, 2008	Kitt Peak	Spacewatch	(5)	1.2 km	MPC; JPL
320824	2008 FO_{31}	—	March 28, 2008	Mount Lemmon	Mount Lemmon Survey	·	1.4 km	MPC; JPL
320825	2008 FX_{37}	—	March 28, 2008	Kitt Peak	Spacewatch	·	1.2 km	MPC; JPL
320826	2008 FB_{38}	—	March 28, 2008	Kitt Peak	Spacewatch	·	2.0 km	MPC; JPL
320827	2008 FU_{39}	—	March 28, 2008	Kitt Peak	Spacewatch	·	1.6 km	MPC; JPL
320828	2008 FY_{40}	—	March 28, 2008	Kitt Peak	Spacewatch	·	1.5 km	MPC; JPL
320829	2008 FY_{43}	—	March 28, 2008	Mount Lemmon	Mount Lemmon Survey	·	2.3 km	MPC; JPL
320830	2008 FC_{44}	—	March 28, 2008	Mount Lemmon	Mount Lemmon Survey	NYS	1.3 km	MPC; JPL
320831	2008 FN_{49}	—	March 28, 2008	Mount Lemmon	Mount Lemmon Survey	·	1.6 km	MPC; JPL
320832	2008 FR_{52}	—	March 28, 2008	Mount Lemmon	Mount Lemmon Survey	·	1.5 km	MPC; JPL
320833	2008 FO_{57}	—	March 28, 2008	Mount Lemmon	Mount Lemmon Survey	·	1.9 km	MPC; JPL
320834	2008 FM_{58}	—	March 28, 2008	Mount Lemmon	Mount Lemmon Survey	·	2.3 km	MPC; JPL
320835	2008 FJ_{60}	—	March 29, 2008	Catalina	CSS	·	2.4 km	MPC; JPL
320836	2008 FE_{61}	—	March 30, 2008	Kitt Peak	Spacewatch	ADE	1.7 km	MPC; JPL
320837	2008 FF_{62}	—	March 27, 2008	Kitt Peak	Spacewatch	·	1.2 km	MPC; JPL
320838	2008 FZ_{62}	—	March 27, 2008	Kitt Peak	Spacewatch	·	2.6 km	MPC; JPL
320839	2008 FM_{66}	—	March 28, 2008	Kitt Peak	Spacewatch	·	2.2 km	MPC; JPL
320840	2008 FQ_{68}	—	March 28, 2008	Mount Lemmon	Mount Lemmon Survey	·	2.7 km	MPC; JPL
320841	2008 FU_{68}	—	March 28, 2008	Mount Lemmon	Mount Lemmon Survey	ADE	2.4 km	MPC; JPL
320842	2008 FA_{72}	—	March 30, 2008	Kitt Peak	Spacewatch	·	1.2 km	MPC; JPL
320843	2008 FY_{76}	—	March 27, 2008	Mount Lemmon	Mount Lemmon Survey	·	2.0 km	MPC; JPL
320844	2008 FT_{78}	—	March 27, 2008	Mount Lemmon	Mount Lemmon Survey	·	2.0 km	MPC; JPL
320845	2008 FF_{80}	—	March 27, 2008	Mount Lemmon	Mount Lemmon Survey	·	1.0 km	MPC; JPL
320846	2008 FE_{85}	—	March 28, 2008	Mount Lemmon	Mount Lemmon Survey	·	1.4 km	MPC; JPL
320847	2008 FJ_{95}	—	March 29, 2008	Kitt Peak	Spacewatch	HOF	3.0 km	MPC; JPL
320848	2008 FU_{95}	—	March 29, 2008	Mount Lemmon	Mount Lemmon Survey	·	3.2 km	MPC; JPL
320849	2008 FO_{100}	—	March 30, 2008	Kitt Peak	Spacewatch	GEF	1.3 km	MPC; JPL
320850	2008 FP_{101}	—	March 30, 2008	Catalina	CSS	·	2.4 km	MPC; JPL
320851	2008 FG_{104}	—	March 30, 2008	Kitt Peak	Spacewatch	EUN	1.6 km	MPC; JPL
320852	2008 FJ_{104}	—	March 30, 2008	Kitt Peak	Spacewatch	·	1.9 km	MPC; JPL
320853	2008 FW_{104}	—	March 30, 2008	Kitt Peak	Spacewatch	·	2.7 km	MPC; JPL
320854	2008 FR_{108}	—	March 31, 2008	Mount Lemmon	Mount Lemmon Survey	GAL	1.8 km	MPC; JPL
320855	2008 FQ_{111}	—	March 31, 2008	Kitt Peak	Spacewatch	·	1.5 km	MPC; JPL
320856	2008 FX_{114}	—	March 31, 2008	Mount Lemmon	Mount Lemmon Survey	AEO	900 m	MPC; JPL
320857	2008 FW_{115}	—	March 31, 2008	Mount Lemmon	Mount Lemmon Survey	·	1.5 km	MPC; JPL
320858	2008 FE_{116}	—	March 31, 2008	Mount Lemmon	Mount Lemmon Survey	·	1.8 km	MPC; JPL
320859	2008 FA_{117}	—	March 31, 2008	Kitt Peak	Spacewatch	·	1.4 km	MPC; JPL
320860	2008 FZ_{122}	—	March 28, 2008	Mount Lemmon	Mount Lemmon Survey	·	2.0 km	MPC; JPL
320861	2008 FR_{125}	—	March 31, 2008	Mount Lemmon	Mount Lemmon Survey	·	1.6 km	MPC; JPL
320862	2008 FF_{126}	—	March 26, 2008	Kitt Peak	Spacewatch	·	1.4 km	MPC; JPL
320863	2008 FQ_{126}	—	March 29, 2008	Catalina	CSS	·	2.4 km	MPC; JPL
320864	2008 FA_{130}	—	March 29, 2008	Kitt Peak	Spacewatch	·	2.2 km	MPC; JPL
320865	2008 FZ_{136}	—	March 29, 2008	Kitt Peak	Spacewatch	·	1.7 km	MPC; JPL
320866	2008 FC_{137}	—	March 29, 2008	Kitt Peak	Spacewatch	·	2.2 km	MPC; JPL
320867	2008 FW_{137}	—	March 31, 2008	Catalina	CSS	JUN	1.3 km	MPC; JPL
320868	2008 GL_{1}	—	April 3, 2008	La Sagra	OAM	EUN	1.9 km	MPC; JPL
320869	2008 GO_{2}	—	April 5, 2008	Eskridge	G. Hug	·	1.3 km	MPC; JPL
320870	2008 GC_{4}	—	April 4, 2008	Grove Creek	Tozzi, F.	·	2.2 km	MPC; JPL
320871	2008 GD_{4}	—	April 4, 2008	Grove Creek	Tozzi, F.	·	2.8 km	MPC; JPL
320872	2008 GP_{4}	—	April 1, 2008	Kitt Peak	Spacewatch	(5)	1.5 km	MPC; JPL
320873	2008 GM_{10}	—	August 30, 2005	Kitt Peak	Spacewatch	·	1.7 km	MPC; JPL
320874	2008 GA_{13}	—	April 3, 2008	Kitt Peak	Spacewatch	·	2.2 km	MPC; JPL
320875	2008 GC_{13}	—	April 3, 2008	Kitt Peak	Spacewatch	·	1.3 km	MPC; JPL
320876	2008 GO_{14}	—	April 3, 2008	Kitt Peak	Spacewatch	·	2.8 km	MPC; JPL
320877	2008 GG_{18}	—	April 4, 2008	Mount Lemmon	Mount Lemmon Survey	·	1.8 km	MPC; JPL
320878	2008 GH_{18}	—	April 4, 2008	Mount Lemmon	Mount Lemmon Survey	·	740 m	MPC; JPL
320879	2008 GQ_{21}	—	April 12, 2008	Mayhill	Dillon, W. G.	·	1.3 km	MPC; JPL
320880 Cabu	2008 GV_{21}	Cabu	April 11, 2008	Nogales	J.-C. Merlin	·	2.2 km	MPC; JPL
320881	2008 GY_{23}	—	April 1, 2008	Mount Lemmon	Mount Lemmon Survey	AGN	1.3 km	MPC; JPL
320882	2008 GS_{24}	—	March 4, 2008	Mount Lemmon	Mount Lemmon Survey	AGN	1.2 km	MPC; JPL
320883	2008 GK_{27}	—	April 3, 2008	Kitt Peak	Spacewatch	·	1.6 km	MPC; JPL
320884	2008 GH_{32}	—	April 3, 2008	Kitt Peak	Spacewatch	·	1.2 km	MPC; JPL
320885	2008 GK_{40}	—	January 27, 2004	Kitt Peak	Spacewatch	·	2.0 km	MPC; JPL
320886	2008 GM_{41}	—	April 4, 2008	Kitt Peak	Spacewatch	·	2.0 km	MPC; JPL
320887	2008 GT_{46}	—	April 4, 2008	Kitt Peak	Spacewatch	·	2.7 km	MPC; JPL
320888	2008 GW_{48}	—	April 5, 2008	Kitt Peak	Spacewatch	·	910 m	MPC; JPL
320889	2008 GL_{50}	—	April 5, 2008	Mount Lemmon	Mount Lemmon Survey	·	1.4 km	MPC; JPL
320890	2008 GW_{50}	—	April 5, 2008	Mount Lemmon	Mount Lemmon Survey	·	1.4 km	MPC; JPL
320891	2008 GU_{55}	—	April 5, 2008	Mount Lemmon	Mount Lemmon Survey	·	2.1 km	MPC; JPL
320892	2008 GP_{58}	—	April 5, 2008	Mount Lemmon	Mount Lemmon Survey	L5	9.3 km	MPC; JPL
320893	2008 GP_{59}	—	April 5, 2008	Kitt Peak	Spacewatch	KOR	1.4 km	MPC; JPL
320894	2008 GL_{62}	—	April 5, 2008	Catalina	CSS	·	2.4 km	MPC; JPL
320895	2008 GU_{62}	—	April 5, 2008	Catalina	CSS	·	1.4 km	MPC; JPL
320896	2008 GJ_{66}	—	April 6, 2008	Kitt Peak	Spacewatch	·	2.4 km	MPC; JPL
320897	2008 GO_{66}	—	April 6, 2008	Kitt Peak	Spacewatch	WIT	1.2 km	MPC; JPL
320898	2008 GY_{68}	—	April 6, 2008	Kitt Peak	Spacewatch	·	2.3 km	MPC; JPL
320899	2008 GO_{70}	—	April 6, 2008	Mount Lemmon	Mount Lemmon Survey	·	1.9 km	MPC; JPL
320900	2008 GJ_{71}	—	April 7, 2008	Mount Lemmon	Mount Lemmon Survey	·	1.7 km	MPC; JPL

== 320901–321000 ==
back to top

Designation			Discovery			Properties		Ref
Permanent	Provisional	Named after	Date	Site	Discoverer(s)	Category	Diam.	Ref
320901	2008 GW_{74}	—	April 7, 2008	Kitt Peak	Spacewatch	·	1.8 km	MPC; JPL
320902	2008 GF_{75}	—	April 7, 2008	Kitt Peak	Spacewatch	·	2.4 km	MPC; JPL
320903	2008 GQ_{76}	—	April 7, 2008	Kitt Peak	Spacewatch	·	2.4 km	MPC; JPL
320904	2008 GF_{81}	—	April 7, 2008	Kitt Peak	Spacewatch	·	2.4 km	MPC; JPL
320905	2008 GJ_{81}	—	April 7, 2008	Kitt Peak	Spacewatch	ADE	2.5 km	MPC; JPL
320906	2008 GX_{82}	—	April 8, 2008	Kitt Peak	Spacewatch	·	2.6 km	MPC; JPL
320907	2008 GA_{83}	—	April 8, 2008	Kitt Peak	Spacewatch	·	1.8 km	MPC; JPL
320908	2008 GG_{83}	—	April 8, 2008	Kitt Peak	Spacewatch	·	2.7 km	MPC; JPL
320909	2008 GW_{85}	—	April 9, 2008	Kitt Peak	Spacewatch	·	2.0 km	MPC; JPL
320910	2008 GM_{86}	—	April 9, 2008	Kitt Peak	Spacewatch	·	2.0 km	MPC; JPL
320911	2008 GT_{88}	—	April 6, 2008	Kitt Peak	Spacewatch	·	1.2 km	MPC; JPL
320912	2008 GR_{92}	—	April 6, 2008	Mount Lemmon	Mount Lemmon Survey	·	2.3 km	MPC; JPL
320913	2008 GK_{94}	—	April 7, 2008	Kitt Peak	Spacewatch	·	1.8 km	MPC; JPL
320914	2008 GZ_{95}	—	April 8, 2008	Kitt Peak	Spacewatch	·	3.2 km	MPC; JPL
320915	2008 GN_{98}	—	April 8, 2008	Kitt Peak	Spacewatch	·	2.0 km	MPC; JPL
320916	2008 GS_{98}	—	April 8, 2008	Kitt Peak	Spacewatch	·	2.4 km	MPC; JPL
320917	2008 GZ_{99}	—	April 9, 2008	Kitt Peak	Spacewatch	EOS	2.4 km	MPC; JPL
320918	2008 GO_{101}	—	February 10, 2008	Mount Lemmon	Mount Lemmon Survey	·	1.7 km	MPC; JPL
320919	2008 GT_{102}	—	April 10, 2008	Kitt Peak	Spacewatch	·	1.9 km	MPC; JPL
320920	2008 GA_{103}	—	April 10, 2008	Kitt Peak	Spacewatch	·	3.2 km	MPC; JPL
320921	2008 GC_{104}	—	April 11, 2008	Kitt Peak	Spacewatch	·	2.5 km	MPC; JPL
320922	2008 GA_{105}	—	April 11, 2008	Kitt Peak	Spacewatch	·	2.1 km	MPC; JPL
320923	2008 GO_{105}	—	April 11, 2008	Catalina	CSS	·	2.7 km	MPC; JPL
320924	2008 GM_{107}	—	April 12, 2008	Mount Lemmon	Mount Lemmon Survey	EOS	2.1 km	MPC; JPL
320925	2008 GR_{111}	—	April 8, 2008	Socorro	LINEAR	·	3.0 km	MPC; JPL
320926	2008 GG_{113}	—	April 8, 2008	Mount Lemmon	Mount Lemmon Survey	·	1.3 km	MPC; JPL
320927	2008 GK_{113}	—	April 8, 2008	Mount Lemmon	Mount Lemmon Survey	·	1.6 km	MPC; JPL
320928	2008 GX_{113}	—	April 9, 2008	Kitt Peak	Spacewatch	EUN	1.4 km	MPC; JPL
320929	2008 GT_{120}	—	April 12, 2008	Catalina	CSS	·	1.4 km	MPC; JPL
320930	2008 GZ_{120}	—	April 12, 2008	Dauban	Kugel, F.	·	2.2 km	MPC; JPL
320931	2008 GP_{121}	—	March 31, 2008	Kitt Peak	Spacewatch	·	2.5 km	MPC; JPL
320932	2008 GQ_{122}	—	April 13, 2008	Kitt Peak	Spacewatch	ADE	1.9 km	MPC; JPL
320933	2008 GJ_{124}	—	April 14, 2008	Mount Lemmon	Mount Lemmon Survey	·	2.5 km	MPC; JPL
320934	2008 GS_{128}	—	April 15, 2008	Catalina	CSS	·	1.9 km	MPC; JPL
320935	2008 GD_{130}	—	April 5, 2008	Catalina	CSS	EUN	1.8 km	MPC; JPL
320936	2008 GW_{130}	—	April 6, 2008	Kitt Peak	Spacewatch	·	2.2 km	MPC; JPL
320937	2008 GH_{133}	—	April 3, 2008	Kitt Peak	Spacewatch	NEM	2.5 km	MPC; JPL
320938	2008 GT_{134}	—	April 10, 2008	Kitt Peak	Spacewatch	HOF	3.2 km	MPC; JPL
320939	2008 GF_{141}	—	April 15, 2008	Mount Lemmon	Mount Lemmon Survey	·	2.0 km	MPC; JPL
320940	2008 GW_{142}	—	April 5, 2008	Catalina	CSS	·	1.9 km	MPC; JPL
320941	2008 GC_{143}	—	October 15, 2001	Kitt Peak	Spacewatch	·	1.5 km	MPC; JPL
320942 Jeanette-Jesse	2008 GC_{145}	Jeanette-Jesse	April 5, 2008	Anderson Mesa	Wasserman, L. H.	·	1.6 km	MPC; JPL
320943	2008 GM_{145}	—	April 6, 2008	Kitt Peak	Spacewatch	·	2.9 km	MPC; JPL
320944	2008 HW	—	April 24, 2008	Mount Lemmon	Mount Lemmon Survey	(5)	1.3 km	MPC; JPL
320945	2008 HG_{1}	—	April 24, 2008	Kitt Peak	Spacewatch	JUN	1.1 km	MPC; JPL
320946	2008 HL_{1}	—	April 24, 2008	Kitt Peak	Spacewatch	·	2.0 km	MPC; JPL
320947	2008 HN_{1}	—	April 24, 2008	Kitt Peak	Spacewatch	·	1.9 km	MPC; JPL
320948	2008 HK_{2}	—	April 25, 2008	La Sagra	OAM	·	1.3 km	MPC; JPL
320949	2008 HR_{4}	—	April 26, 2008	Bergisch Gladbach	W. Bickel	·	2.5 km	MPC; JPL
320950	2008 HZ_{4}	—	April 24, 2008	Kitt Peak	Spacewatch	L5	10 km	MPC; JPL
320951	2008 HG_{8}	—	April 24, 2008	Kitt Peak	Spacewatch	·	2.2 km	MPC; JPL
320952	2008 HC_{11}	—	April 24, 2008	Kitt Peak	Spacewatch	·	1.6 km	MPC; JPL
320953	2008 HB_{12}	—	April 24, 2008	Catalina	CSS	(194)	2.5 km	MPC; JPL
320954	2008 HT_{14}	—	April 25, 2008	Kitt Peak	Spacewatch	·	1.6 km	MPC; JPL
320955	2008 HY_{15}	—	April 25, 2008	Kitt Peak	Spacewatch	·	2.4 km	MPC; JPL
320956	2008 HS_{17}	—	April 26, 2008	Kitt Peak	Spacewatch	·	2.3 km	MPC; JPL
320957	2008 HX_{17}	—	April 26, 2008	Kitt Peak	Spacewatch	·	2.1 km	MPC; JPL
320958	2008 HZ_{18}	—	April 26, 2008	Mount Lemmon	Mount Lemmon Survey	·	1.9 km	MPC; JPL
320959	2008 HP_{21}	—	April 26, 2008	Kitt Peak	Spacewatch	·	2.0 km	MPC; JPL
320960	2008 HN_{24}	—	April 27, 2008	Kitt Peak	Spacewatch	·	2.3 km	MPC; JPL
320961	2008 HL_{28}	—	April 28, 2008	Kitt Peak	Spacewatch	·	1.6 km	MPC; JPL
320962	2008 HC_{34}	—	April 27, 2008	Kitt Peak	Spacewatch	·	2.2 km	MPC; JPL
320963	2008 HH_{34}	—	April 27, 2008	Kitt Peak	Spacewatch	·	2.1 km	MPC; JPL
320964	2008 HT_{34}	—	April 27, 2008	Mount Lemmon	Mount Lemmon Survey	·	1.9 km	MPC; JPL
320965	2008 HU_{34}	—	April 27, 2008	Mount Lemmon	Mount Lemmon Survey	·	3.5 km	MPC; JPL
320966	2008 HH_{36}	—	April 29, 2008	Kitt Peak	Spacewatch	·	2.0 km	MPC; JPL
320967	2008 HS_{41}	—	April 26, 2008	Mount Lemmon	Mount Lemmon Survey	·	2.1 km	MPC; JPL
320968	2008 HW_{42}	—	April 27, 2008	Mount Lemmon	Mount Lemmon Survey	·	1.7 km	MPC; JPL
320969	2008 HW_{45}	—	April 28, 2008	Kitt Peak	Spacewatch	·	4.0 km	MPC; JPL
320970	2008 HC_{46}	—	April 28, 2008	Kitt Peak	Spacewatch	·	2.2 km	MPC; JPL
320971	2008 HJ_{47}	—	April 28, 2008	Mount Lemmon	Mount Lemmon Survey	·	3.2 km	MPC; JPL
320972	2008 HE_{61}	—	April 14, 2008	Mount Lemmon	Mount Lemmon Survey	EOS	2.3 km	MPC; JPL
320973	2008 JH_{3}	—	May 2, 2008	Kitt Peak	Spacewatch	·	2.8 km	MPC; JPL
320974	2008 JF_{4}	—	May 1, 2008	Kitt Peak	Spacewatch	·	3.2 km	MPC; JPL
320975	2008 JH_{4}	—	May 1, 2008	Kitt Peak	Spacewatch	DOR	2.8 km	MPC; JPL
320976	2008 JR_{6}	—	May 2, 2008	Kitt Peak	Spacewatch	·	2.0 km	MPC; JPL
320977 Grudziądz	2008 JQ_{8}	Grudziądz	May 4, 2008	Moletai	Molėtai	·	2.3 km	MPC; JPL
320978	2008 JU_{8}	—	May 1, 2008	Catalina	CSS	·	2.1 km	MPC; JPL
320979	2008 JC_{9}	—	May 2, 2008	Kitt Peak	Spacewatch	HOF	3.3 km	MPC; JPL
320980	2008 JU_{10}	—	May 3, 2008	Kitt Peak	Spacewatch	·	2.1 km	MPC; JPL
320981	2008 JK_{12}	—	May 3, 2008	Kitt Peak	Spacewatch	·	3.7 km	MPC; JPL
320982	2008 JP_{13}	—	May 5, 2008	Mount Lemmon	Mount Lemmon Survey	EOS	1.8 km	MPC; JPL
320983	2008 JC_{20}	—	May 7, 2008	Skylive	Tozzi, F.	·	2.3 km	MPC; JPL
320984	2008 JW_{21}	—	December 17, 2007	Mount Lemmon	Mount Lemmon Survey	·	1.9 km	MPC; JPL
320985	2008 JH_{23}	—	May 7, 2008	Kitt Peak	Spacewatch	KOR	1.2 km	MPC; JPL
320986	2008 JC_{24}	—	May 8, 2008	Vail-Jarnac	Jarnac	RAF	1.2 km	MPC; JPL
320987	2008 JH_{24}	—	October 29, 2005	Catalina	CSS	EUN	1.9 km	MPC; JPL
320988	2008 JT_{27}	—	May 8, 2008	Kitt Peak	Spacewatch	·	1.5 km	MPC; JPL
320989	2008 JA_{31}	—	May 15, 2008	Mount Lemmon	Mount Lemmon Survey	T_{j} (2.96)	6.2 km	MPC; JPL
320990	2008 JZ_{39}	—	May 3, 2008	Kitt Peak	Spacewatch	AGN	1.1 km	MPC; JPL
320991	2008 KE_{4}	—	May 27, 2008	Kitt Peak	Spacewatch	·	2.2 km	MPC; JPL
320992	2008 KF_{4}	—	May 27, 2008	Kitt Peak	Spacewatch	·	2.1 km	MPC; JPL
320993	2008 KN_{4}	—	May 27, 2008	Kitt Peak	Spacewatch	·	1.9 km	MPC; JPL
320994	2008 KO_{5}	—	May 28, 2008	Kitt Peak	Spacewatch	·	3.5 km	MPC; JPL
320995	2008 KN_{6}	—	May 26, 2008	Kitt Peak	Spacewatch	DOR	2.4 km	MPC; JPL
320996	2008 KX_{6}	—	May 26, 2008	Kitt Peak	Spacewatch	·	2.8 km	MPC; JPL
320997	2008 KX_{11}	—	May 28, 2008	Grove Creek	Tozzi, F.	·	2.4 km	MPC; JPL
320998	2008 KK_{12}	—	May 26, 2008	Kitt Peak	Spacewatch	·	2.3 km	MPC; JPL
320999	2008 KA_{13}	—	May 27, 2008	Kitt Peak	Spacewatch	·	1.1 km	MPC; JPL
321000	2008 KH_{13}	—	May 27, 2008	Kitt Peak	Spacewatch	THM	2.3 km	MPC; JPL

back to top

== See also ==
- Meanings of minor-planet names: 320001–321000
