= List of minor planets: 319001–320000 =

The following is a partial list of minor planets, running from minor-planet number 319001 through 320000, inclusive. The primary data for this and other partial lists is based on JPL's "Small-Body Orbital Elements" and data available from the Minor Planet Center. Critical list information is also provided by the MPC, unless otherwise specified from Lowell Observatory. A detailed description of the table's columns and additional sources are given on the main page including a complete list of every page in this series, and a statistical break-up on the dynamical classification of minor planets.

Also see the summary list of all named bodies in numerical and alphabetical order, and the corresponding naming citations for the number range of this particular list. New namings may only be added to this list after official publication, as the preannouncement of names is condemned by the Working Group for Small Bodies Nomenclature of the International Astronomical Union.

Near-Earth obj.	MBA (inner)	MBA (outer)	Centaur
Mars-crosser	MBA (middle)	Jupiter trojan	Trans-Neptunian obj.
Unclassified

== 319001–319100 ==
Designation			Discovery			Properties		Ref
Permanent	Provisional	Named after	Date	Site	Discoverer(s)	Category	Diam.	Ref
319001	2005 UG_{431}	—	October 24, 2005	Kitt Peak	Spacewatch	·	1.6 km	MPC · JPL
319002	2005 UR_{434}	—	October 29, 2005	Mount Lemmon	Mount Lemmon Survey	·	2.2 km	MPC · JPL
319003	2005 UE_{448}	—	October 30, 2005	Socorro	LINEAR	·	2.9 km	MPC · JPL
319004	2005 UB_{476}	—	October 23, 2005	Palomar	NEAT	·	2.6 km	MPC · JPL
319005	2005 UY_{477}	—	October 27, 2005	Kitt Peak	Spacewatch	KOR	1.6 km	MPC · JPL
319006	2005 UT_{478}	—	October 27, 2005	Mount Lemmon	Mount Lemmon Survey	·	2.4 km	MPC · JPL
319007	2005 UN_{479}	—	October 30, 2005	Catalina	CSS	H	840 m	MPC · JPL
319008	2005 UR_{482}	—	October 22, 2005	Catalina	CSS	H	710 m	MPC · JPL
319009 Kudirka	2005 UP_{488}	Kudirka	October 23, 2005	Catalina	CSS	HOF	3.1 km	MPC · JPL
319010	2005 UX_{488}	—	October 23, 2005	Catalina	CSS	·	2.4 km	MPC · JPL
319011	2005 UE_{492}	—	October 24, 2005	Palomar	NEAT	·	3.0 km	MPC · JPL
319012	2005 UM_{497}	—	October 27, 2005	Socorro	LINEAR	·	2.0 km	MPC · JPL
319013	2005 UR_{497}	—	October 27, 2005	Socorro	LINEAR	HNS	1.7 km	MPC · JPL
319014	2005 UF_{500}	—	October 27, 2005	Palomar	NEAT	·	2.2 km	MPC · JPL
319015	2005 UE_{502}	—	October 23, 2005	Catalina	CSS	·	2.3 km	MPC · JPL
319016	2005 UK_{509}	—	October 29, 2005	Catalina	CSS	·	4.1 km	MPC · JPL
319017	2005 UU_{511}	—	October 28, 2005	Mount Lemmon	Mount Lemmon Survey	·	3.6 km	MPC · JPL
319018	2005 UC_{512}	—	October 28, 2005	Mount Lemmon	Mount Lemmon Survey	·	4.1 km	MPC · JPL
319019	2005 UT_{521}	—	October 26, 2005	Apache Point	A. C. Becker	MRX	1.1 km	MPC · JPL
319020	2005 UN_{530}	—	October 27, 2005	Kitt Peak	Spacewatch	·	2.7 km	MPC · JPL
319021	2005 VA_{1}	—	November 3, 2005	Socorro	LINEAR	H	760 m	MPC · JPL
319022	2005 VA_{5}	—	November 5, 2005	Kitt Peak	Spacewatch	·	2.6 km	MPC · JPL
319023	2005 VF_{5}	—	November 8, 2005	Piszkéstető	K. Sárneczky	·	2.2 km	MPC · JPL
319024	2005 VZ_{5}	—	November 11, 2005	Socorro	LINEAR	H	1.0 km	MPC · JPL
319025	2005 VS_{14}	—	November 3, 2005	Mount Lemmon	Mount Lemmon Survey	·	2.0 km	MPC · JPL
319026	2005 VM_{18}	—	November 1, 2005	Kitt Peak	Spacewatch	KOR	1.2 km	MPC · JPL
319027	2005 VQ_{18}	—	November 1, 2005	Kitt Peak	Spacewatch	·	1.5 km	MPC · JPL
319028	2005 VL_{19}	—	November 1, 2005	Kitt Peak	Spacewatch	·	2.3 km	MPC · JPL
319029	2005 VL_{25}	—	November 2, 2005	Socorro	LINEAR	·	2.4 km	MPC · JPL
319030	2005 VF_{26}	—	October 11, 2005	Kitt Peak	Spacewatch	·	2.4 km	MPC · JPL
319031	2005 VV_{39}	—	November 4, 2005	Catalina	CSS	·	2.1 km	MPC · JPL
319032	2005 VQ_{40}	—	November 4, 2005	Mount Lemmon	Mount Lemmon Survey	WIT	1.4 km	MPC · JPL
319033	2005 VD_{44}	—	November 3, 2005	Mount Lemmon	Mount Lemmon Survey	·	1.9 km	MPC · JPL
319034	2005 VZ_{49}	—	November 2, 2005	Mount Lemmon	Mount Lemmon Survey	·	1.5 km	MPC · JPL
319035	2005 VB_{52}	—	November 3, 2005	Catalina	CSS	·	3.1 km	MPC · JPL
319036	2005 VN_{60}	—	November 5, 2005	Catalina	CSS	·	2.1 km	MPC · JPL
319037	2005 VP_{66}	—	November 1, 2005	Mount Lemmon	Mount Lemmon Survey	(12739)	1.9 km	MPC · JPL
319038	2005 VD_{69}	—	November 1, 2005	Mount Lemmon	Mount Lemmon Survey	·	1.5 km	MPC · JPL
319039	2005 VG_{70}	—	November 2, 2005	Mount Lemmon	Mount Lemmon Survey	·	2.6 km	MPC · JPL
319040	2005 VH_{71}	—	November 1, 2005	Mount Lemmon	Mount Lemmon Survey	·	1.5 km	MPC · JPL
319041	2005 VY_{71}	—	November 1, 2005	Mount Lemmon	Mount Lemmon Survey	·	2.5 km	MPC · JPL
319042	2005 VU_{75}	—	November 2, 2005	Mount Lemmon	Mount Lemmon Survey	·	2.5 km	MPC · JPL
319043	2005 VT_{95}	—	November 6, 2005	Kitt Peak	Spacewatch	KOR	1.5 km	MPC · JPL
319044	2005 VZ_{98}	—	September 27, 1994	Kitt Peak	Spacewatch	·	2.9 km	MPC · JPL
319045	2005 VF_{104}	—	October 25, 2005	Kitt Peak	Spacewatch	·	2.1 km	MPC · JPL
319046	2005 VA_{109}	—	November 6, 2005	Mount Lemmon	Mount Lemmon Survey	KOR	1.4 km	MPC · JPL
319047	2005 VQ_{110}	—	November 6, 2005	Mount Lemmon	Mount Lemmon Survey	·	1.7 km	MPC · JPL
319048	2005 VH_{114}	—	November 10, 2005	Mount Lemmon	Mount Lemmon Survey	(2076)	1.1 km	MPC · JPL
319049	2005 VS_{123}	—	November 2, 2005	Mount Lemmon	Mount Lemmon Survey	HOF	3.7 km	MPC · JPL
319050	2005 VM_{126}	—	November 1, 2005	Apache Point	A. C. Becker	·	1.4 km	MPC · JPL
319051	2005 VO_{130}	—	November 1, 2005	Apache Point	A. C. Becker	·	1.7 km	MPC · JPL
319052	2005 VT_{130}	—	October 8, 2005	Kitt Peak	Spacewatch	·	1.9 km	MPC · JPL
319053	2005 VB_{134}	—	November 1, 2005	Apache Point	A. C. Becker	·	3.0 km	MPC · JPL
319054	2005 WT_{7}	—	November 21, 2005	Palomar	NEAT	·	740 m	MPC · JPL
319055	2005 WZ_{7}	—	October 27, 2005	Mount Lemmon	Mount Lemmon Survey	EOS	2.3 km	MPC · JPL
319056	2005 WV_{11}	—	November 22, 2005	Kitt Peak	Spacewatch	·	2.4 km	MPC · JPL
319057	2005 WT_{13}	—	October 1, 2005	Mount Lemmon	Mount Lemmon Survey	·	2.1 km	MPC · JPL
319058	2005 WE_{16}	—	November 22, 2005	Kitt Peak	Spacewatch	EOS	2.0 km	MPC · JPL
319059	2005 WF_{16}	—	November 22, 2005	Kitt Peak	Spacewatch	·	2.2 km	MPC · JPL
319060	2005 WZ_{17}	—	November 22, 2005	Kitt Peak	Spacewatch	EOS	2.1 km	MPC · JPL
319061	2005 WV_{20}	—	November 21, 2005	Kitt Peak	Spacewatch	EOS	1.8 km	MPC · JPL
319062	2005 WZ_{24}	—	November 21, 2005	Kitt Peak	Spacewatch	·	2.5 km	MPC · JPL
319063	2005 WT_{26}	—	October 27, 2005	Mount Lemmon	Mount Lemmon Survey	KOR	1.6 km	MPC · JPL
319064	2005 WL_{27}	—	November 21, 2005	Kitt Peak	Spacewatch	·	1.5 km	MPC · JPL
319065	2005 WE_{28}	—	November 21, 2005	Kitt Peak	Spacewatch	AGN	1.4 km	MPC · JPL
319066	2005 WC_{29}	—	November 21, 2005	Kitt Peak	Spacewatch	EOS	3.1 km	MPC · JPL
319067	2005 WJ_{34}	—	November 21, 2005	Catalina	CSS	·	3.0 km	MPC · JPL
319068	2005 WP_{37}	—	November 22, 2005	Kitt Peak	Spacewatch	KOR	1.5 km	MPC · JPL
319069	2005 WA_{39}	—	November 9, 2005	Kitt Peak	Spacewatch	EOS	2.2 km	MPC · JPL
319070	2005 WO_{43}	—	November 21, 2005	Kitt Peak	Spacewatch	·	2.8 km	MPC · JPL
319071	2005 WT_{54}	—	November 25, 2005	Marly	P. Kocher	·	4.3 km	MPC · JPL
319072	2005 WY_{56}	—	November 29, 2005	Junk Bond	D. Healy	·	2.0 km	MPC · JPL
319073	2005 WC_{57}	—	November 28, 2005	Palomar	NEAT	H	870 m	MPC · JPL
319074	2005 WD_{81}	—	November 26, 2005	Mount Lemmon	Mount Lemmon Survey	EOS	2.1 km	MPC · JPL
319075	2005 WE_{87}	—	November 28, 2005	Mount Lemmon	Mount Lemmon Survey	·	3.6 km	MPC · JPL
319076	2005 WR_{87}	—	November 28, 2005	Mount Lemmon	Mount Lemmon Survey	T_{j} (2.98)	5.6 km	MPC · JPL
319077	2005 WQ_{89}	—	November 26, 2005	Kitt Peak	Spacewatch	T_{j} (2.98)	4.6 km	MPC · JPL
319078	2005 WM_{93}	—	November 25, 2005	Mount Lemmon	Mount Lemmon Survey	·	1.4 km	MPC · JPL
319079	2005 WD_{94}	—	November 26, 2005	Kitt Peak	Spacewatch	KOR	1.6 km	MPC · JPL
319080	2005 WF_{98}	—	November 28, 2005	Kitt Peak	Spacewatch	·	1.7 km	MPC · JPL
319081	2005 WA_{113}	—	November 25, 2005	Catalina	CSS	·	5.3 km	MPC · JPL
319082	2005 WJ_{113}	—	November 25, 2005	Catalina	CSS	·	2.6 km	MPC · JPL
319083	2005 WH_{115}	—	November 29, 2005	Mount Lemmon	Mount Lemmon Survey	·	3.1 km	MPC · JPL
319084	2005 WZ_{118}	—	October 24, 2005	Kitt Peak	Spacewatch	EOS	2.0 km	MPC · JPL
319085	2005 WD_{127}	—	November 1, 2005	Kitt Peak	Spacewatch	·	1.8 km	MPC · JPL
319086	2005 WL_{127}	—	November 25, 2005	Mount Lemmon	Mount Lemmon Survey	·	2.7 km	MPC · JPL
319087	2005 WN_{127}	—	November 25, 2005	Mount Lemmon	Mount Lemmon Survey	KOR	1.3 km	MPC · JPL
319088	2005 WS_{135}	—	November 26, 2005	Kitt Peak	Spacewatch	·	2.0 km	MPC · JPL
319089	2005 WA_{140}	—	November 26, 2005	Mount Lemmon	Mount Lemmon Survey	·	2.6 km	MPC · JPL
319090 Barbarahillary	2005 WQ_{140}	Barbarahillary	November 26, 2005	Mount Lemmon	Mount Lemmon Survey	·	2.8 km	MPC · JPL
319091	2005 WR_{146}	—	November 25, 2005	Kitt Peak	Spacewatch	·	2.4 km	MPC · JPL
319092	2005 WE_{147}	—	November 25, 2005	Kitt Peak	Spacewatch	·	1.4 km	MPC · JPL
319093	2005 WH_{148}	—	November 26, 2005	Catalina	CSS	·	2.7 km	MPC · JPL
319094	2005 WU_{149}	—	November 28, 2005	Kitt Peak	Spacewatch	MAR	1.6 km	MPC · JPL
319095	2005 WG_{150}	—	November 28, 2005	Kitt Peak	Spacewatch	·	1.8 km	MPC · JPL
319096	2005 WD_{157}	—	November 22, 2005	Kitt Peak	Spacewatch	LIX	5.3 km	MPC · JPL
319097	2005 WK_{160}	—	November 28, 2005	Kitt Peak	Spacewatch	·	2.5 km	MPC · JPL
319098	2005 WS_{164}	—	November 29, 2005	Mount Lemmon	Mount Lemmon Survey	·	1.5 km	MPC · JPL
319099	2005 WZ_{165}	—	November 22, 2005	Kitt Peak	Spacewatch	·	2.1 km	MPC · JPL
319100	2005 WN_{166}	—	November 29, 2005	Mount Lemmon	Mount Lemmon Survey	·	2.6 km	MPC · JPL

== 319101–319200 ==
back to top

Designation			Discovery			Properties		Ref
Permanent	Provisional	Named after	Date	Site	Discoverer(s)	Category	Diam.	Ref
319101	2005 WZ_{171}	—	November 30, 2005	Mount Lemmon	Mount Lemmon Survey	KOR	1.4 km	MPC · JPL
319102	2005 WP_{173}	—	November 30, 2005	Socorro	LINEAR	NYS	1.2 km	MPC · JPL
319103	2005 WE_{183}	—	November 28, 2005	Socorro	LINEAR	·	1.1 km	MPC · JPL
319104	2005 WJ_{191}	—	November 22, 2005	Catalina	CSS	·	3.0 km	MPC · JPL
319105	2005 WG_{197}	—	November 30, 2005	Anderson Mesa	LONEOS	·	5.2 km	MPC · JPL
319106	2005 WK_{201}	—	November 28, 2005	Catalina	CSS	·	2.6 km	MPC · JPL
319107	2005 WV_{202}	—	November 30, 2005	Kitt Peak	Spacewatch	·	2.2 km	MPC · JPL
319108	2005 WE_{211}	—	November 25, 2005	Mount Lemmon	Mount Lemmon Survey	·	4.0 km	MPC · JPL
319109	2005 XG	—	December 1, 2005	Junk Bond	D. Healy	NYS	990 m	MPC · JPL
319110	2005 XW_{13}	—	December 1, 2005	Kitt Peak	Spacewatch	·	2.9 km	MPC · JPL
319111	2005 XU_{14}	—	December 1, 2005	Kitt Peak	Spacewatch	·	3.2 km	MPC · JPL
319112	2005 XA_{15}	—	December 1, 2005	Kitt Peak	Spacewatch	·	1.6 km	MPC · JPL
319113	2005 XY_{18}	—	December 1, 2005	Kitt Peak	Spacewatch	·	2.9 km	MPC · JPL
319114	2005 XC_{27}	—	December 4, 2005	Kitt Peak	Spacewatch	·	1.3 km	MPC · JPL
319115	2005 XW_{33}	—	December 4, 2005	Kitt Peak	Spacewatch	MAR	1.8 km	MPC · JPL
319116	2005 XF_{63}	—	December 5, 2005	Mount Lemmon	Mount Lemmon Survey	·	2.0 km	MPC · JPL
319117	2005 XU_{63}	—	December 6, 2005	Socorro	LINEAR	·	3.7 km	MPC · JPL
319118	2005 XH_{65}	—	December 7, 2005	Socorro	LINEAR	·	3.8 km	MPC · JPL
319119	2005 XP_{65}	—	December 3, 2005	Kitt Peak	Spacewatch	·	800 m	MPC · JPL
319120	2005 XV_{73}	—	December 6, 2005	Kitt Peak	Spacewatch	EOS	2.7 km	MPC · JPL
319121	2005 XD_{76}	—	December 7, 2005	Kitt Peak	Spacewatch	·	2.4 km	MPC · JPL
319122	2005 XL_{76}	—	December 7, 2005	Catalina	CSS	·	4.6 km	MPC · JPL
319123	2005 XR_{77}	—	December 9, 2005	Socorro	LINEAR	·	3.0 km	MPC · JPL
319124	2005 XR_{80}	—	December 10, 2005	Catalina	CSS	·	3.4 km	MPC · JPL
319125	2005 XR_{83}	—	December 5, 2005	Socorro	LINEAR	·	4.2 km	MPC · JPL
319126	2005 XP_{90}	—	December 8, 2005	Kitt Peak	Spacewatch	·	2.9 km	MPC · JPL
319127	2005 XQ_{105}	—	December 1, 2005	Kitt Peak	M. W. Buie	THM	2.9 km	MPC · JPL
319128	2005 XR_{116}	—	December 5, 2005	Kitt Peak	Spacewatch	·	2.3 km	MPC · JPL
319129	2005 YC_{2}	—	November 6, 2005	Mount Lemmon	Mount Lemmon Survey	·	2.1 km	MPC · JPL
319130	2005 YZ_{2}	—	December 21, 2005	Catalina	CSS	·	3.4 km	MPC · JPL
319131	2005 YN_{6}	—	December 21, 2005	Catalina	CSS	·	2.7 km	MPC · JPL
319132	2005 YY_{7}	—	December 22, 2005	Kitt Peak	Spacewatch	·	3.3 km	MPC · JPL
319133	2005 YK_{8}	—	December 22, 2005	Kitt Peak	Spacewatch	·	3.0 km	MPC · JPL
319134	2005 YV_{8}	—	December 20, 2005	Wrightwood	J. W. Young	·	2.7 km	MPC · JPL
319135	2005 YB_{11}	—	December 21, 2005	Kitt Peak	Spacewatch	·	3.2 km	MPC · JPL
319136	2005 YJ_{11}	—	December 8, 2005	Kitt Peak	Spacewatch	·	2.2 km	MPC · JPL
319137	2005 YM_{13}	—	December 22, 2005	Kitt Peak	Spacewatch	·	2.1 km	MPC · JPL
319138	2005 YR_{14}	—	December 22, 2005	Kitt Peak	Spacewatch	HYG	2.9 km	MPC · JPL
319139	2005 YP_{15}	—	December 22, 2005	Kitt Peak	Spacewatch	HYG	2.8 km	MPC · JPL
319140	2005 YX_{18}	—	December 23, 2005	Kitt Peak	Spacewatch	KOR	1.4 km	MPC · JPL
319141	2005 YJ_{21}	—	December 24, 2005	Kitt Peak	Spacewatch	NYS	1.2 km	MPC · JPL
319142	2005 YG_{23}	—	December 24, 2005	Kitt Peak	Spacewatch	·	2.5 km	MPC · JPL
319143	2005 YT_{23}	—	December 24, 2005	Kitt Peak	Spacewatch	·	2.9 km	MPC · JPL
319144	2005 YJ_{24}	—	December 24, 2005	Kitt Peak	Spacewatch	·	2.4 km	MPC · JPL
319145	2005 YZ_{26}	—	December 22, 2005	Kitt Peak	Spacewatch	·	1.5 km	MPC · JPL
319146	2005 YA_{28}	—	December 22, 2005	Kitt Peak	Spacewatch	·	2.8 km	MPC · JPL
319147	2005 YU_{28}	—	December 22, 2005	Kitt Peak	Spacewatch	·	1.2 km	MPC · JPL
319148	2005 YL_{30}	—	December 21, 2005	Kitt Peak	Spacewatch	EOS	2.6 km	MPC · JPL
319149	2005 YU_{39}	—	December 22, 2005	Kitt Peak	Spacewatch	·	4.3 km	MPC · JPL
319150	2005 YF_{53}	—	December 22, 2005	Kitt Peak	Spacewatch	·	4.4 km	MPC · JPL
319151	2005 YM_{56}	—	December 22, 2005	Kitt Peak	Spacewatch	·	2.8 km	MPC · JPL
319152	2005 YX_{56}	—	December 24, 2005	Kitt Peak	Spacewatch	·	2.7 km	MPC · JPL
319153	2005 YP_{61}	—	December 24, 2005	Kitt Peak	Spacewatch	V	750 m	MPC · JPL
319154	2005 YK_{65}	—	December 25, 2005	Kitt Peak	Spacewatch	·	2.2 km	MPC · JPL
319155	2005 YN_{66}	—	October 27, 2005	Mount Lemmon	Mount Lemmon Survey	·	4.9 km	MPC · JPL
319156	2005 YK_{67}	—	December 26, 2005	Kitt Peak	Spacewatch	LIX	3.6 km	MPC · JPL
319157	2005 YG_{69}	—	December 26, 2005	Kitt Peak	Spacewatch	·	3.3 km	MPC · JPL
319158	2005 YJ_{75}	—	December 24, 2005	Kitt Peak	Spacewatch	·	3.9 km	MPC · JPL
319159	2005 YT_{75}	—	December 24, 2005	Kitt Peak	Spacewatch	·	2.3 km	MPC · JPL
319160	2005 YV_{77}	—	December 24, 2005	Kitt Peak	Spacewatch	·	3.2 km	MPC · JPL
319161	2005 YB_{80}	—	December 24, 2005	Kitt Peak	Spacewatch	·	2.7 km	MPC · JPL
319162	2005 YX_{82}	—	December 24, 2005	Kitt Peak	Spacewatch	NYS	1.3 km	MPC · JPL
319163	2005 YQ_{83}	—	December 24, 2005	Kitt Peak	Spacewatch	HYG	3.4 km	MPC · JPL
319164	2005 YB_{84}	—	December 24, 2005	Kitt Peak	Spacewatch	·	2.9 km	MPC · JPL
319165	2005 YJ_{85}	—	November 26, 2005	Mount Lemmon	Mount Lemmon Survey	VER	3.5 km	MPC · JPL
319166	2005 YJ_{88}	—	December 25, 2005	Mount Lemmon	Mount Lemmon Survey	ADE	3.9 km	MPC · JPL
319167	2005 YU_{92}	—	December 27, 2005	Mount Lemmon	Mount Lemmon Survey	AEG	4.1 km	MPC · JPL
319168	2005 YY_{99}	—	December 28, 2005	Kitt Peak	Spacewatch	·	2.8 km	MPC · JPL
319169	2005 YR_{108}	—	December 25, 2005	Kitt Peak	Spacewatch	·	3.3 km	MPC · JPL
319170	2005 YW_{108}	—	December 25, 2005	Kitt Peak	Spacewatch	·	2.6 km	MPC · JPL
319171	2005 YS_{110}	—	December 25, 2005	Kitt Peak	Spacewatch	·	2.7 km	MPC · JPL
319172	2005 YR_{111}	—	December 25, 2005	Kitt Peak	Spacewatch	·	3.4 km	MPC · JPL
319173	2005 YS_{111}	—	December 25, 2005	Kitt Peak	Spacewatch	·	3.2 km	MPC · JPL
319174	2005 YQ_{114}	—	December 25, 2005	Kitt Peak	Spacewatch	VER	3.1 km	MPC · JPL
319175	2005 YE_{115}	—	December 25, 2005	Kitt Peak	Spacewatch	·	3.4 km	MPC · JPL
319176	2005 YR_{116}	—	December 25, 2005	Kitt Peak	Spacewatch	·	1.5 km	MPC · JPL
319177	2005 YW_{117}	—	December 25, 2005	Kitt Peak	Spacewatch	·	1.3 km	MPC · JPL
319178	2005 YU_{118}	—	December 26, 2005	Mount Lemmon	Mount Lemmon Survey	·	2.7 km	MPC · JPL
319179	2005 YH_{120}	—	December 27, 2005	Mount Lemmon	Mount Lemmon Survey	·	1.4 km	MPC · JPL
319180	2005 YU_{124}	—	December 26, 2005	Kitt Peak	Spacewatch	·	2.8 km	MPC · JPL
319181	2005 YH_{125}	—	December 26, 2005	Kitt Peak	Spacewatch	AGN	1.4 km	MPC · JPL
319182	2005 YO_{129}	—	December 24, 2005	Kitt Peak	Spacewatch	·	1.0 km	MPC · JPL
319183	2005 YD_{131}	—	December 25, 2005	Mount Lemmon	Mount Lemmon Survey	·	3.7 km	MPC · JPL
319184	2005 YY_{131}	—	December 25, 2005	Mount Lemmon	Mount Lemmon Survey	TIR	3.5 km	MPC · JPL
319185	2005 YZ_{133}	—	December 26, 2005	Kitt Peak	Spacewatch	VER	4.0 km	MPC · JPL
319186	2005 YW_{138}	—	December 26, 2005	Kitt Peak	Spacewatch	·	2.7 km	MPC · JPL
319187	2005 YL_{144}	—	December 28, 2005	Mount Lemmon	Mount Lemmon Survey	·	3.7 km	MPC · JPL
319188	2005 YS_{144}	—	December 28, 2005	Mount Lemmon	Mount Lemmon Survey	(31811)	4.3 km	MPC · JPL
319189	2005 YZ_{144}	—	December 28, 2005	Mount Lemmon	Mount Lemmon Survey	THM	2.2 km	MPC · JPL
319190	2005 YG_{145}	—	December 29, 2005	Catalina	CSS	·	4.7 km	MPC · JPL
319191	2005 YE_{149}	—	December 25, 2005	Kitt Peak	Spacewatch	·	2.9 km	MPC · JPL
319192	2005 YA_{150}	—	December 25, 2005	Kitt Peak	Spacewatch	·	770 m	MPC · JPL
319193	2005 YV_{154}	—	December 29, 2005	Kitt Peak	Spacewatch	3:2 · SHU	6.9 km	MPC · JPL
319194	2005 YR_{156}	—	August 7, 2004	Palomar	NEAT	(5)	1.5 km	MPC · JPL
319195	2005 YW_{160}	—	December 27, 2005	Kitt Peak	Spacewatch	·	2.4 km	MPC · JPL
319196	2005 YU_{164}	—	December 29, 2005	Catalina	CSS	·	3.5 km	MPC · JPL
319197	2005 YF_{165}	—	November 21, 2005	Kitt Peak	Spacewatch	·	2.6 km	MPC · JPL
319198	2005 YM_{167}	—	December 27, 2005	Kitt Peak	Spacewatch	·	2.0 km	MPC · JPL
319199	2005 YY_{171}	—	December 22, 2005	Catalina	CSS	·	2.7 km	MPC · JPL
319200	2005 YU_{175}	—	December 22, 2005	Kitt Peak	Spacewatch	·	4.3 km	MPC · JPL

== 319201–319300 ==
back to top

Designation			Discovery			Properties		Ref
Permanent	Provisional	Named after	Date	Site	Discoverer(s)	Category	Diam.	Ref
319201	2005 YK_{181}	—	December 24, 2005	Catalina	CSS	THB	4.6 km	MPC · JPL
319202	2005 YM_{186}	—	November 10, 2005	Kitt Peak	Spacewatch	EUP	5.3 km	MPC · JPL
319203	2005 YC_{191}	—	December 30, 2005	Kitt Peak	Spacewatch	·	3.1 km	MPC · JPL
319204	2005 YH_{191}	—	December 30, 2005	Kitt Peak	Spacewatch	·	3.5 km	MPC · JPL
319205	2005 YU_{194}	—	December 31, 2005	Kitt Peak	Spacewatch	LIX	4.4 km	MPC · JPL
319206	2005 YH_{198}	—	December 25, 2005	Mount Lemmon	Mount Lemmon Survey	·	1.9 km	MPC · JPL
319207	2005 YR_{198}	—	December 25, 2005	Kitt Peak	Spacewatch	·	4.4 km	MPC · JPL
319208	2005 YY_{201}	—	December 24, 2005	Kitt Peak	Spacewatch	VER	3.6 km	MPC · JPL
319209	2005 YK_{205}	—	December 26, 2005	Mount Lemmon	Mount Lemmon Survey	EOS	2.9 km	MPC · JPL
319210	2005 YU_{207}	—	December 30, 2005	Kitt Peak	Spacewatch	·	4.3 km	MPC · JPL
319211	2005 YN_{211}	—	December 28, 2005	Palomar	NEAT	·	1.7 km	MPC · JPL
319212	2005 YH_{214}	—	December 30, 2005	Catalina	CSS	EOS	2.9 km	MPC · JPL
319213	2005 YA_{227}	—	December 25, 2005	Mount Lemmon	Mount Lemmon Survey	EMA	4.3 km	MPC · JPL
319214	2005 YF_{232}	—	December 28, 2005	Kitt Peak	Spacewatch	EOS	2.1 km	MPC · JPL
319215	2005 YP_{236}	—	December 28, 2005	Kitt Peak	Spacewatch	·	3.5 km	MPC · JPL
319216	2005 YM_{239}	—	December 29, 2005	Kitt Peak	Spacewatch	·	2.4 km	MPC · JPL
319217	2005 YX_{244}	—	December 30, 2005	Kitt Peak	Spacewatch	·	3.5 km	MPC · JPL
319218	2005 YY_{244}	—	December 30, 2005	Kitt Peak	Spacewatch	THM	2.8 km	MPC · JPL
319219	2005 YM_{261}	—	December 25, 2005	Kitt Peak	Spacewatch	·	2.2 km	MPC · JPL
319220	2005 YF_{262}	—	December 25, 2005	Kitt Peak	Spacewatch	·	2.8 km	MPC · JPL
319221	2005 YD_{264}	—	December 25, 2005	Kitt Peak	Spacewatch	·	950 m	MPC · JPL
319222	2005 YZ_{272}	—	December 30, 2005	Kitt Peak	Spacewatch	·	3.4 km	MPC · JPL
319223	2005 YW_{274}	—	December 30, 2005	Mount Lemmon	Mount Lemmon Survey	EOS	2.7 km	MPC · JPL
319224	2005 YV_{281}	—	December 26, 2005	Mount Lemmon	Mount Lemmon Survey	·	1.8 km	MPC · JPL
319225	2005 YX_{290}	—	December 28, 2005	Kitt Peak	Spacewatch	·	2.5 km	MPC · JPL
319226	2006 AH_{8}	—	January 7, 2006	Socorro	LINEAR	T_{j} (2.94)	5.3 km	MPC · JPL
319227 Erichbär	2006 AJ_{8}	Erichbär	January 9, 2006	Radebeul	M. Fiedler	EOS	2.6 km	MPC · JPL
319228	2006 AS_{8}	—	January 2, 2006	Mount Lemmon	Mount Lemmon Survey	NYS	1.3 km	MPC · JPL
319229	2006 AD_{10}	—	January 4, 2006	Mount Lemmon	Mount Lemmon Survey	·	2.4 km	MPC · JPL
319230	2006 AH_{15}	—	January 5, 2006	Mount Lemmon	Mount Lemmon Survey	·	1.1 km	MPC · JPL
319231	2006 AN_{17}	—	January 5, 2006	Kitt Peak	Spacewatch	·	2.5 km	MPC · JPL
319232	2006 AO_{23}	—	January 4, 2006	Kitt Peak	Spacewatch	·	3.0 km	MPC · JPL
319233	2006 AV_{23}	—	January 4, 2006	Mount Lemmon	Mount Lemmon Survey	·	5.9 km	MPC · JPL
319234	2006 AT_{24}	—	December 5, 2005	Mount Lemmon	Mount Lemmon Survey	·	2.7 km	MPC · JPL
319235	2006 AE_{27}	—	January 5, 2006	Mount Lemmon	Mount Lemmon Survey	V	820 m	MPC · JPL
319236	2006 AM_{30}	—	January 2, 2006	Socorro	LINEAR	THB	4.5 km	MPC · JPL
319237	2006 AO_{38}	—	January 7, 2006	Mount Lemmon	Mount Lemmon Survey	·	1.3 km	MPC · JPL
319238	2006 AV_{39}	—	January 7, 2006	Mount Lemmon	Mount Lemmon Survey	·	2.4 km	MPC · JPL
319239	2006 AY_{40}	—	January 7, 2006	Kitt Peak	Spacewatch	·	1.2 km	MPC · JPL
319240	2006 AE_{41}	—	January 7, 2006	Kitt Peak	Spacewatch	·	2.3 km	MPC · JPL
319241	2006 AE_{42}	—	November 29, 2005	Mount Lemmon	Mount Lemmon Survey	·	4.1 km	MPC · JPL
319242	2006 AG_{45}	—	January 4, 2006	Kitt Peak	Spacewatch	(5)	1.9 km	MPC · JPL
319243	2006 AL_{47}	—	May 4, 2002	Palomar	NEAT	EOS	3.1 km	MPC · JPL
319244	2006 AY_{48}	—	January 4, 2006	Mount Lemmon	Mount Lemmon Survey	·	2.9 km	MPC · JPL
319245	2006 AK_{50}	—	December 2, 2005	Mount Lemmon	Mount Lemmon Survey	VER	2.7 km	MPC · JPL
319246	2006 AB_{51}	—	January 5, 2006	Kitt Peak	Spacewatch	KOR	1.5 km	MPC · JPL
319247	2006 AX_{51}	—	January 5, 2006	Kitt Peak	Spacewatch	·	1.2 km	MPC · JPL
319248	2006 AY_{63}	—	January 7, 2006	Mount Lemmon	Mount Lemmon Survey	·	1.4 km	MPC · JPL
319249	2006 AL_{66}	—	January 9, 2006	Kitt Peak	Spacewatch	·	3.1 km	MPC · JPL
319250	2006 AZ_{67}	—	January 5, 2006	Mount Lemmon	Mount Lemmon Survey	THM	3.0 km	MPC · JPL
319251	2006 AM_{71}	—	January 6, 2006	Kitt Peak	Spacewatch	·	3.7 km	MPC · JPL
319252	2006 AD_{81}	—	January 4, 2006	Catalina	CSS	·	4.4 km	MPC · JPL
319253	2006 AM_{83}	—	January 10, 2006	Catalina	CSS	·	5.3 km	MPC · JPL
319254	2006 AS_{83}	—	January 5, 2006	Catalina	CSS	·	3.6 km	MPC · JPL
319255	2006 AT_{83}	—	January 5, 2006	Socorro	LINEAR	EOS	2.9 km	MPC · JPL
319256	2006 AM_{84}	—	January 6, 2006	Anderson Mesa	LONEOS	·	4.3 km	MPC · JPL
319257	2006 AE_{87}	—	January 2, 2006	Mount Lemmon	Mount Lemmon Survey	·	2.4 km	MPC · JPL
319258	2006 AQ_{92}	—	January 7, 2006	Mount Lemmon	Mount Lemmon Survey	·	1.2 km	MPC · JPL
319259	2006 AY_{100}	—	January 10, 2006	Mount Lemmon	Mount Lemmon Survey	·	3.8 km	MPC · JPL
319260	2006 AB_{102}	—	January 7, 2006	Mount Lemmon	Mount Lemmon Survey	·	1.2 km	MPC · JPL
319261	2006 BQ_{4}	—	January 21, 2006	Kitt Peak	Spacewatch	·	3.9 km	MPC · JPL
319262	2006 BX_{5}	—	January 22, 2006	Mayhill	Lowe, A.	·	5.5 km	MPC · JPL
319263	2006 BY_{10}	—	January 20, 2006	Kitt Peak	Spacewatch	THM	2.7 km	MPC · JPL
319264	2006 BE_{12}	—	January 21, 2006	Kitt Peak	Spacewatch	·	2.9 km	MPC · JPL
319265	2006 BS_{21}	—	January 22, 2006	Mount Lemmon	Mount Lemmon Survey	·	3.7 km	MPC · JPL
319266	2006 BL_{22}	—	January 22, 2006	Mount Lemmon	Mount Lemmon Survey	·	2.6 km	MPC · JPL
319267	2006 BG_{23}	—	January 23, 2006	Kitt Peak	Spacewatch	EOS	2.8 km	MPC · JPL
319268	2006 BH_{27}	—	January 20, 2006	Kitt Peak	Spacewatch	THM	3.3 km	MPC · JPL
319269	2006 BU_{41}	—	January 22, 2006	Mount Lemmon	Mount Lemmon Survey	·	1.5 km	MPC · JPL
319270	2006 BA_{42}	—	January 23, 2006	Kitt Peak	Spacewatch	·	3.1 km	MPC · JPL
319271	2006 BT_{42}	—	January 23, 2006	Kitt Peak	Spacewatch	·	3.2 km	MPC · JPL
319272	2006 BR_{44}	—	January 23, 2006	Mount Lemmon	Mount Lemmon Survey	·	860 m	MPC · JPL
319273	2006 BP_{45}	—	January 23, 2006	Mount Lemmon	Mount Lemmon Survey	·	5.5 km	MPC · JPL
319274	2006 BZ_{47}	—	January 25, 2006	Kitt Peak	Spacewatch	·	2.5 km	MPC · JPL
319275	2006 BU_{50}	—	January 25, 2006	Kitt Peak	Spacewatch	·	3.8 km	MPC · JPL
319276	2006 BG_{59}	—	January 23, 2006	Mount Lemmon	Mount Lemmon Survey	THM	2.1 km	MPC · JPL
319277	2006 BJ_{60}	—	January 26, 2006	Catalina	CSS	THM	2.8 km	MPC · JPL
319278	2006 BY_{61}	—	January 22, 2006	Anderson Mesa	LONEOS	·	4.8 km	MPC · JPL
319279	2006 BR_{66}	—	January 23, 2006	Kitt Peak	Spacewatch	·	3.4 km	MPC · JPL
319280	2006 BW_{66}	—	January 23, 2006	Kitt Peak	Spacewatch	·	3.2 km	MPC · JPL
319281	2006 BQ_{73}	—	January 23, 2006	Kitt Peak	Spacewatch	NYS	1.7 km	MPC · JPL
319282	2006 BY_{73}	—	January 23, 2006	Kitt Peak	Spacewatch	L5	10 km	MPC · JPL
319283	2006 BO_{76}	—	January 23, 2006	Kitt Peak	Spacewatch	·	5.4 km	MPC · JPL
319284	2006 BW_{77}	—	January 23, 2006	Mount Lemmon	Mount Lemmon Survey	·	1.8 km	MPC · JPL
319285	2006 BS_{78}	—	January 23, 2006	Mount Lemmon	Mount Lemmon Survey	ANF	1.8 km	MPC · JPL
319286	2006 BU_{82}	—	January 24, 2006	Mount Lemmon	Mount Lemmon Survey	EOS	1.9 km	MPC · JPL
319287	2006 BN_{85}	—	January 25, 2006	Kitt Peak	Spacewatch	·	1.9 km	MPC · JPL
319288	2006 BD_{87}	—	January 25, 2006	Kitt Peak	Spacewatch	·	3.2 km	MPC · JPL
319289	2006 BV_{87}	—	January 25, 2006	Kitt Peak	Spacewatch	THM	2.4 km	MPC · JPL
319290	2006 BM_{88}	—	January 25, 2006	Kitt Peak	Spacewatch	·	3.8 km	MPC · JPL
319291	2006 BM_{89}	—	January 25, 2006	Kitt Peak	Spacewatch	·	2.6 km	MPC · JPL
319292	2006 BX_{90}	—	January 26, 2006	Kitt Peak	Spacewatch	·	3.6 km	MPC · JPL
319293	2006 BG_{91}	—	January 26, 2006	Kitt Peak	Spacewatch	·	3.5 km	MPC · JPL
319294	2006 BN_{92}	—	January 26, 2006	Catalina	CSS	·	3.7 km	MPC · JPL
319295	2006 BG_{96}	—	January 4, 2006	Mount Lemmon	Mount Lemmon Survey	CYB	3.9 km	MPC · JPL
319296	2006 BC_{103}	—	January 23, 2006	Mount Lemmon	Mount Lemmon Survey	·	2.9 km	MPC · JPL
319297	2006 BX_{103}	—	January 23, 2006	Mount Lemmon	Mount Lemmon Survey	·	730 m	MPC · JPL
319298	2006 BK_{109}	—	January 25, 2006	Kitt Peak	Spacewatch	EOS	2.4 km	MPC · JPL
319299	2006 BE_{110}	—	January 25, 2006	Kitt Peak	Spacewatch	·	4.6 km	MPC · JPL
319300	2006 BC_{111}	—	January 25, 2006	Kitt Peak	Spacewatch	·	3.4 km	MPC · JPL

== 319301–319400 ==
back to top

Designation			Discovery			Properties		Ref
Permanent	Provisional	Named after	Date	Site	Discoverer(s)	Category	Diam.	Ref
319301	2006 BD_{113}	—	January 25, 2006	Kitt Peak	Spacewatch	·	3.2 km	MPC · JPL
319302	2006 BV_{114}	—	January 26, 2006	Kitt Peak	Spacewatch	CYB	4.5 km	MPC · JPL
319303	2006 BY_{117}	—	January 26, 2006	Mount Lemmon	Mount Lemmon Survey	·	3.2 km	MPC · JPL
319304	2006 BA_{120}	—	January 26, 2006	Kitt Peak	Spacewatch	·	4.2 km	MPC · JPL
319305	2006 BB_{124}	—	January 26, 2006	Kitt Peak	Spacewatch	·	4.1 km	MPC · JPL
319306	2006 BC_{127}	—	January 26, 2006	Kitt Peak	Spacewatch	·	2.7 km	MPC · JPL
319307	2006 BA_{134}	—	January 27, 2006	Kitt Peak	Spacewatch	·	3.0 km	MPC · JPL
319308	2006 BG_{142}	—	January 26, 2006	Kitt Peak	Spacewatch	·	1.6 km	MPC · JPL
319309	2006 BR_{143}	—	January 26, 2006	Kitt Peak	Spacewatch	(159)	3.5 km	MPC · JPL
319310	2006 BT_{143}	—	January 21, 2006	Anderson Mesa	LONEOS	·	2.5 km	MPC · JPL
319311	2006 BW_{146}	—	January 28, 2006	Bergisch Gladbach	W. Bickel	·	2.9 km	MPC · JPL
319312	2006 BD_{149}	—	February 4, 2002	Haleakala	NEAT	·	1.6 km	MPC · JPL
319313	2006 BD_{152}	—	January 25, 2006	Kitt Peak	Spacewatch	MAS	890 m	MPC · JPL
319314	2006 BJ_{156}	—	January 25, 2006	Kitt Peak	Spacewatch	·	1.7 km	MPC · JPL
319315	2006 BF_{157}	—	January 25, 2006	Kitt Peak	Spacewatch	·	3.3 km	MPC · JPL
319316	2006 BE_{159}	—	January 26, 2006	Kitt Peak	Spacewatch	·	3.9 km	MPC · JPL
319317	2006 BV_{163}	—	January 26, 2006	Mount Lemmon	Mount Lemmon Survey	VER	4.0 km	MPC · JPL
319318	2006 BF_{164}	—	January 26, 2006	Mount Lemmon	Mount Lemmon Survey	HYG	3.3 km	MPC · JPL
319319	2006 BH_{166}	—	January 26, 2006	Mount Lemmon	Mount Lemmon Survey	·	3.6 km	MPC · JPL
319320	2006 BG_{167}	—	January 26, 2006	Mount Lemmon	Mount Lemmon Survey	·	4.0 km	MPC · JPL
319321	2006 BX_{167}	—	January 26, 2006	Mount Lemmon	Mount Lemmon Survey	·	3.8 km	MPC · JPL
319322	2006 BO_{172}	—	January 27, 2006	Kitt Peak	Spacewatch	·	3.9 km	MPC · JPL
319323	2006 BG_{174}	—	January 27, 2006	Kitt Peak	Spacewatch	·	1.5 km	MPC · JPL
319324	2006 BV_{174}	—	January 27, 2006	Kitt Peak	Spacewatch	·	4.1 km	MPC · JPL
319325	2006 BO_{177}	—	January 27, 2006	Mount Lemmon	Mount Lemmon Survey	·	2.7 km	MPC · JPL
319326	2006 BD_{178}	—	April 7, 2003	Kitt Peak	Spacewatch	MAS	880 m	MPC · JPL
319327	2006 BV_{180}	—	January 27, 2006	Mount Lemmon	Mount Lemmon Survey	·	3.7 km	MPC · JPL
319328	2006 BX_{183}	—	December 30, 2005	Mount Lemmon	Mount Lemmon Survey	VER	3.4 km	MPC · JPL
319329	2006 BE_{193}	—	January 30, 2006	Kitt Peak	Spacewatch	·	2.0 km	MPC · JPL
319330	2006 BE_{204}	—	January 31, 2006	Kitt Peak	Spacewatch	·	2.5 km	MPC · JPL
319331	2006 BA_{206}	—	January 31, 2006	Mount Lemmon	Mount Lemmon Survey	·	1.5 km	MPC · JPL
319332	2006 BD_{210}	—	January 31, 2006	Kitt Peak	Spacewatch	VER	4.0 km	MPC · JPL
319333	2006 BR_{224}	—	January 30, 2006	Kitt Peak	Spacewatch	URS	3.7 km	MPC · JPL
319334	2006 BV_{239}	—	January 31, 2006	Kitt Peak	Spacewatch	VER	4.5 km	MPC · JPL
319335	2006 BA_{243}	—	January 31, 2006	Kitt Peak	Spacewatch	TIR ·	5.4 km	MPC · JPL
319336	2006 BG_{247}	—	January 31, 2006	Kitt Peak	Spacewatch	·	3.3 km	MPC · JPL
319337	2006 BO_{257}	—	January 31, 2006	Kitt Peak	Spacewatch	·	4.0 km	MPC · JPL
319338	2006 BQ_{257}	—	January 31, 2006	Mount Lemmon	Mount Lemmon Survey	·	1.4 km	MPC · JPL
319339	2006 BX_{265}	—	January 31, 2006	Kitt Peak	Spacewatch	·	4.1 km	MPC · JPL
319340	2006 BG_{266}	—	January 31, 2006	Kitt Peak	Spacewatch	·	5.7 km	MPC · JPL
319341	2006 BB_{268}	—	January 26, 2006	Catalina	CSS	·	6.7 km	MPC · JPL
319342	2006 BY_{273}	—	January 25, 2006	Kitt Peak	Spacewatch	L5	9.5 km	MPC · JPL
319343	2006 BD_{281}	—	January 27, 2006	Mount Lemmon	Mount Lemmon Survey	·	1.6 km	MPC · JPL
319344	2006 BQ_{283}	—	January 22, 2006	Mount Lemmon	Mount Lemmon Survey	·	4.1 km	MPC · JPL
319345	2006 CY_{8}	—	February 1, 2006	Mount Lemmon	Mount Lemmon Survey	·	3.8 km	MPC · JPL
319346	2006 CC_{13}	—	February 1, 2006	Kitt Peak	Spacewatch	·	2.2 km	MPC · JPL
319347	2006 CD_{17}	—	February 1, 2006	Mount Lemmon	Mount Lemmon Survey	EOS	2.4 km	MPC · JPL
319348	2006 CS_{21}	—	February 1, 2006	Kitt Peak	Spacewatch	HYG	3.9 km	MPC · JPL
319349	2006 CV_{23}	—	February 2, 2006	Kitt Peak	Spacewatch	THM	2.9 km	MPC · JPL
319350	2006 CO_{24}	—	February 2, 2006	Kitt Peak	Spacewatch	·	4.3 km	MPC · JPL
319351	2006 CO_{36}	—	February 2, 2006	Mount Lemmon	Mount Lemmon Survey	·	1.0 km	MPC · JPL
319352	2006 CN_{39}	—	February 2, 2006	Kitt Peak	Spacewatch	·	3.9 km	MPC · JPL
319353	2006 CC_{49}	—	February 3, 2006	Kitt Peak	Spacewatch	·	3.8 km	MPC · JPL
319354	2006 CZ_{51}	—	February 4, 2006	Kitt Peak	Spacewatch	HYG	3.7 km	MPC · JPL
319355	2006 CD_{54}	—	December 24, 2005	Catalina	CSS	·	4.7 km	MPC · JPL
319356	2006 CX_{59}	—	February 6, 2006	Mount Lemmon	Mount Lemmon Survey	CYB	3.4 km	MPC · JPL
319357	2006 CS_{61}	—	February 3, 2006	Anderson Mesa	LONEOS	·	4.1 km	MPC · JPL
319358	2006 CE_{64}	—	February 2, 2006	Mauna Kea	P. A. Wiegert	KOR	1.7 km	MPC · JPL
319359	2006 DP_{2}	—	February 20, 2006	Kitt Peak	Spacewatch	·	3.3 km	MPC · JPL
319360	2006 DZ_{9}	—	February 21, 2006	Catalina	CSS	·	1.3 km	MPC · JPL
319361	2006 DB_{19}	—	February 4, 2006	Kitt Peak	Spacewatch	·	1.7 km	MPC · JPL
319362	2006 DD_{19}	—	February 20, 2006	Kitt Peak	Spacewatch	·	1.3 km	MPC · JPL
319363	2006 DV_{24}	—	February 20, 2006	Kitt Peak	Spacewatch	MAS	820 m	MPC · JPL
319364	2006 DU_{29}	—	February 20, 2006	Kitt Peak	Spacewatch	·	2.2 km	MPC · JPL
319365	2006 DR_{44}	—	February 20, 2006	Mount Lemmon	Mount Lemmon Survey	THM	2.6 km	MPC · JPL
319366	2006 DU_{54}	—	February 24, 2006	Kitt Peak	Spacewatch	·	1.2 km	MPC · JPL
319367	2006 DL_{64}	—	February 20, 2006	Socorro	LINEAR	·	3.7 km	MPC · JPL
319368	2006 DQ_{67}	—	February 23, 2006	Anderson Mesa	LONEOS	·	1.5 km	MPC · JPL
319369	2006 DA_{70}	—	February 20, 2006	Kitt Peak	Spacewatch	·	2.4 km	MPC · JPL
319370	2006 DL_{71}	—	February 21, 2006	Mount Lemmon	Mount Lemmon Survey	VER	3.1 km	MPC · JPL
319371	2006 DG_{72}	—	February 22, 2006	Catalina	CSS	·	4.2 km	MPC · JPL
319372	2006 DG_{74}	—	February 23, 2006	Mount Lemmon	Mount Lemmon Survey	·	3.5 km	MPC · JPL
319373	2006 DT_{82}	—	February 24, 2006	Kitt Peak	Spacewatch	·	1.4 km	MPC · JPL
319374	2006 DX_{84}	—	February 24, 2006	Kitt Peak	Spacewatch	·	1.7 km	MPC · JPL
319375	2006 DW_{86}	—	February 24, 2006	Kitt Peak	Spacewatch	·	950 m	MPC · JPL
319376	2006 DV_{115}	—	February 27, 2006	Kitt Peak	Spacewatch	·	3.8 km	MPC · JPL
319377	2006 DP_{119}	—	February 20, 2006	Socorro	LINEAR	·	6.1 km	MPC · JPL
319378	2006 DS_{138}	—	February 25, 2006	Kitt Peak	Spacewatch	L5	9.2 km	MPC · JPL
319379	2006 DC_{146}	—	February 25, 2006	Mount Lemmon	Mount Lemmon Survey	EOS	2.3 km	MPC · JPL
319380	2006 DR_{146}	—	February 25, 2006	Kitt Peak	Spacewatch	·	3.4 km	MPC · JPL
319381	2006 DL_{147}	—	September 28, 2003	Kitt Peak	Spacewatch	·	3.1 km	MPC · JPL
319382	2006 DC_{152}	—	February 25, 2006	Kitt Peak	Spacewatch	·	1.1 km	MPC · JPL
319383	2006 DS_{174}	—	February 27, 2006	Kitt Peak	Spacewatch	·	1.8 km	MPC · JPL
319384	2006 DH_{175}	—	February 27, 2006	Catalina	CSS	EUP	4.6 km	MPC · JPL
319385	2006 DY_{178}	—	February 27, 2006	Mount Lemmon	Mount Lemmon Survey	·	3.8 km	MPC · JPL
319386	2006 DH_{202}	—	February 21, 2006	Anderson Mesa	LONEOS	·	4.8 km	MPC · JPL
319387	2006 EO_{19}	—	March 2, 2006	Kitt Peak	Spacewatch	·	3.4 km	MPC · JPL
319388	2006 EP_{26}	—	March 3, 2006	Kitt Peak	Spacewatch	·	3.1 km	MPC · JPL
319389	2006 EK_{33}	—	March 3, 2006	Mount Lemmon	Mount Lemmon Survey	HOF	3.2 km	MPC · JPL
319390	2006 EU_{37}	—	March 4, 2006	Anderson Mesa	LONEOS	·	4.7 km	MPC · JPL
319391	2006 EH_{46}	—	March 4, 2006	Kitt Peak	Spacewatch	·	3.5 km	MPC · JPL
319392	2006 EL_{68}	—	March 2, 2006	Kitt Peak	M. W. Buie	·	1.7 km	MPC · JPL
319393	2006 EV_{68}	—	March 2, 2006	Kitt Peak	M. W. Buie	·	2.9 km	MPC · JPL
319394	2006 ET_{69}	—	March 4, 2006	Catalina	CSS	T_{j} (2.94) · slow	4.8 km	MPC · JPL
319395	2006 FP_{7}	—	March 23, 2006	Kitt Peak	Spacewatch	KOR	1.5 km	MPC · JPL
319396	2006 FG_{14}	—	March 23, 2006	Kitt Peak	Spacewatch	·	770 m	MPC · JPL
319397	2006 GU_{1}	—	April 2, 2006	Mount Lemmon	Mount Lemmon Survey	(2076)	880 m	MPC · JPL
319398	2006 GJ_{8}	—	April 2, 2006	Kitt Peak	Spacewatch	·	1.4 km	MPC · JPL
319399	2006 GF_{13}	—	April 2, 2006	Kitt Peak	Spacewatch	·	2.6 km	MPC · JPL
319400	2006 GG_{13}	—	April 2, 2006	Kitt Peak	Spacewatch	·	2.5 km	MPC · JPL

== 319401–319500 ==
back to top

Designation			Discovery			Properties		Ref
Permanent	Provisional	Named after	Date	Site	Discoverer(s)	Category	Diam.	Ref
319401	2006 GG_{22}	—	April 2, 2006	Kitt Peak	Spacewatch	NEM	3.3 km	MPC · JPL
319402	2006 GZ_{23}	—	April 2, 2006	Kitt Peak	Spacewatch	·	2.1 km	MPC · JPL
319403	2006 GZ_{41}	—	April 8, 2006	Catalina	CSS	(5)	1.6 km	MPC · JPL
319404	2006 GT_{42}	—	April 7, 2006	Siding Spring	SSS	·	5.1 km	MPC · JPL
319405	2006 GG_{44}	—	April 2, 2006	Kitt Peak	Spacewatch	·	910 m	MPC · JPL
319406	2006 GG_{49}	—	April 2, 2006	Catalina	CSS	·	3.9 km	MPC · JPL
319407	2006 HJ_{8}	—	April 19, 2006	Kitt Peak	Spacewatch	·	4.0 km	MPC · JPL
319408	2006 HT_{9}	—	April 19, 2006	Kitt Peak	Spacewatch	·	2.1 km	MPC · JPL
319409	2006 HP_{18}	—	April 23, 2006	Mayhill	Lowe, A.	·	1.9 km	MPC · JPL
319410	2006 HX_{19}	—	April 19, 2006	Mount Lemmon	Mount Lemmon Survey	·	5.1 km	MPC · JPL
319411	2006 HJ_{25}	—	April 20, 2006	Kitt Peak	Spacewatch	·	1.0 km	MPC · JPL
319412	2006 HJ_{27}	—	April 20, 2006	Mount Lemmon	Mount Lemmon Survey	·	680 m	MPC · JPL
319413	2006 HK_{34}	—	April 19, 2006	Mount Lemmon	Mount Lemmon Survey	·	2.1 km	MPC · JPL
319414	2006 HV_{35}	—	April 20, 2006	Kitt Peak	Spacewatch	·	1.2 km	MPC · JPL
319415	2006 HC_{37}	—	April 21, 2006	Kitt Peak	Spacewatch	·	4.5 km	MPC · JPL
319416	2006 HG_{38}	—	April 21, 2006	Kitt Peak	Spacewatch	·	710 m	MPC · JPL
319417	2006 HJ_{49}	—	April 25, 2006	Kitt Peak	Spacewatch	·	2.6 km	MPC · JPL
319418	2006 HY_{63}	—	April 24, 2006	Kitt Peak	Spacewatch	·	1.9 km	MPC · JPL
319419	2006 HC_{68}	—	April 24, 2006	Mount Lemmon	Mount Lemmon Survey	·	620 m	MPC · JPL
319420	2006 HQ_{71}	—	April 25, 2006	Kitt Peak	Spacewatch	·	2.9 km	MPC · JPL
319421	2006 HR_{77}	—	April 26, 2006	Kitt Peak	Spacewatch	·	1.4 km	MPC · JPL
319422	2006 HW_{80}	—	April 26, 2006	Kitt Peak	Spacewatch	·	1.4 km	MPC · JPL
319423	2006 HN_{86}	—	April 27, 2006	Catalina	CSS	·	3.6 km	MPC · JPL
319424	2006 HN_{88}	—	April 30, 2006	Kitt Peak	Spacewatch	KOR	1.6 km	MPC · JPL
319425	2006 HM_{98}	—	April 30, 2006	Kitt Peak	Spacewatch	·	690 m	MPC · JPL
319426	2006 HO_{98}	—	April 30, 2006	Kitt Peak	Spacewatch	KOR	1.4 km	MPC · JPL
319427	2006 HC_{102}	—	April 30, 2006	Kitt Peak	Spacewatch	3:2	6.8 km	MPC · JPL
319428	2006 HH_{103}	—	April 30, 2006	Kitt Peak	Spacewatch	TIR	3.5 km	MPC · JPL
319429	2006 HM_{120}	—	April 30, 2006	Kitt Peak	Spacewatch	·	1.4 km	MPC · JPL
319430	2006 HH_{140}	—	April 26, 2006	Cerro Tololo	M. W. Buie	3:2	7.9 km	MPC · JPL
319431	2006 JG_{7}	—	May 1, 2006	Kitt Peak	Spacewatch	·	7.2 km	MPC · JPL
319432	2006 JH_{11}	—	May 1, 2006	Kitt Peak	Spacewatch	·	700 m	MPC · JPL
319433	2006 JP_{18}	—	May 2, 2006	Mount Lemmon	Mount Lemmon Survey	·	1.3 km	MPC · JPL
319434	2006 JZ_{39}	—	May 6, 2006	Mount Lemmon	Mount Lemmon Survey	(17392)	1.6 km	MPC · JPL
319435	2006 JW_{48}	—	May 10, 2006	Palomar	NEAT	·	4.0 km	MPC · JPL
319436	2006 JZ_{50}	—	May 2, 2006	Mount Lemmon	Mount Lemmon Survey	·	810 m	MPC · JPL
319437	2006 JY_{79}	—	May 1, 2006	Kitt Peak	Spacewatch	MRX	1.3 km	MPC · JPL
319438	2006 KD_{2}	—	May 17, 2006	Siding Spring	SSS	·	2.6 km	MPC · JPL
319439	2006 KN_{4}	—	May 19, 2006	Mount Lemmon	Mount Lemmon Survey	3:2	6.3 km	MPC · JPL
319440	2006 KM_{33}	—	May 20, 2006	Kitt Peak	Spacewatch	·	730 m	MPC · JPL
319441	2006 KW_{52}	—	May 21, 2006	Kitt Peak	Spacewatch	·	600 m	MPC · JPL
319442	2006 KA_{53}	—	May 21, 2006	Kitt Peak	Spacewatch	·	2.9 km	MPC · JPL
319443	2006 KW_{59}	—	May 22, 2006	Kitt Peak	Spacewatch	·	3.7 km	MPC · JPL
319444	2006 KL_{61}	—	May 22, 2006	Kitt Peak	Spacewatch	·	670 m	MPC · JPL
319445	2006 KU_{61}	—	May 22, 2006	Kitt Peak	Spacewatch	·	2.2 km	MPC · JPL
319446	2006 KV_{63}	—	May 23, 2006	Mount Lemmon	Mount Lemmon Survey	GEF	1.6 km	MPC · JPL
319447	2006 KJ_{65}	—	May 24, 2006	Kitt Peak	Spacewatch	·	3.0 km	MPC · JPL
319448	2006 KR_{66}	—	May 24, 2006	Kitt Peak	Spacewatch	·	750 m	MPC · JPL
319449	2006 KN_{69}	—	May 22, 2006	Kitt Peak	Spacewatch	·	1.9 km	MPC · JPL
319450	2006 KO_{69}	—	May 22, 2006	Kitt Peak	Spacewatch	·	1.9 km	MPC · JPL
319451	2006 KC_{75}	—	May 24, 2006	Kitt Peak	Spacewatch	·	3.1 km	MPC · JPL
319452	2006 KH_{78}	—	May 24, 2006	Mount Lemmon	Mount Lemmon Survey	·	1.9 km	MPC · JPL
319453	2006 KN_{81}	—	May 25, 2006	Palomar	NEAT	·	790 m	MPC · JPL
319454	2006 KC_{116}	—	May 29, 2006	Kitt Peak	Spacewatch	KOR	1.5 km	MPC · JPL
319455	2006 KB_{142}	—	May 25, 2006	Mauna Kea	P. A. Wiegert	·	2.4 km	MPC · JPL
319456	2006 KB_{145}	—	May 26, 2006	Mount Lemmon	Mount Lemmon Survey	NYS	1.6 km	MPC · JPL
319457	2006 LM_{3}	—	May 26, 2006	Mount Lemmon	Mount Lemmon Survey	·	4.5 km	MPC · JPL
319458	2006 LY_{4}	—	June 2, 2006	Kitt Peak	Spacewatch	·	710 m	MPC · JPL
319459	2006 MA_{6}	—	June 18, 2006	Palomar	NEAT	NYS	1.3 km	MPC · JPL
319460	2006 NJ	—	July 3, 2006	Hibiscus	S. F. Hönig	·	760 m	MPC · JPL
319461	2006 OP_{2}	—	July 19, 2006	Palomar	NEAT	·	1.6 km	MPC · JPL
319462	2006 OB_{4}	—	July 21, 2006	Mount Lemmon	Mount Lemmon Survey	·	1.4 km	MPC · JPL
319463	2006 OW_{6}	—	July 24, 2006	Pla D'Arguines	R. Ferrando	·	4.0 km	MPC · JPL
319464	2006 OU_{9}	—	July 24, 2006	Altschwendt	W. Ries	THM	3.1 km	MPC · JPL
319465	2006 OR_{11}	—	July 21, 2006	Socorro	LINEAR	·	1.3 km	MPC · JPL
319466	2006 OA_{12}	—	July 21, 2006	Catalina	CSS	·	2.4 km	MPC · JPL
319467	2006 OE_{16}	—	May 4, 2006	Mount Lemmon	Mount Lemmon Survey	·	790 m	MPC · JPL
319468	2006 PP_{1}	—	August 11, 2006	Palomar	NEAT	·	830 m	MPC · JPL
319469	2006 PY_{2}	—	August 12, 2006	Palomar	NEAT	EOS	2.4 km	MPC · JPL
319470	2006 PA_{7}	—	August 12, 2006	Palomar	NEAT	·	960 m	MPC · JPL
319471	2006 PA_{8}	—	August 12, 2006	Palomar	NEAT	·	1.5 km	MPC · JPL
319472	2006 PS_{11}	—	August 13, 2006	Palomar	NEAT	·	1.2 km	MPC · JPL
319473	2006 PO_{13}	—	August 14, 2006	Siding Spring	SSS	V	730 m	MPC · JPL
319474	2006 PS_{16}	—	August 15, 2006	Palomar	NEAT	·	2.2 km	MPC · JPL
319475	2006 PC_{17}	—	August 15, 2006	Palomar	NEAT	·	1.5 km	MPC · JPL
319476	2006 PO_{20}	—	August 15, 2006	Palomar	NEAT	H	850 m	MPC · JPL
319477	2006 PC_{27}	—	August 15, 2006	Palomar	NEAT	·	1.0 km	MPC · JPL
319478	2006 PB_{30}	—	August 12, 2006	Lulin	Lin, H.-C., Q. Ye	·	1.1 km	MPC · JPL
319479	2006 PC_{30}	—	August 15, 2006	Lulin	Lin, C.-S., Q. Ye	·	770 m	MPC · JPL
319480	2006 QO_{1}	—	August 16, 2006	Siding Spring	SSS	·	1.2 km	MPC · JPL
319481	2006 QO_{9}	—	August 19, 2006	Palomar	NEAT	·	1.3 km	MPC · JPL
319482	2006 QQ_{11}	—	August 16, 2006	Siding Spring	SSS	·	990 m	MPC · JPL
319483	2006 QV_{14}	—	August 17, 2006	Palomar	NEAT	MAS	820 m	MPC · JPL
319484	2006 QU_{18}	—	August 17, 2006	Palomar	NEAT	ERI	1.5 km	MPC · JPL
319485	2006 QH_{19}	—	August 17, 2006	Palomar	NEAT	·	920 m	MPC · JPL
319486	2006 QF_{20}	—	August 18, 2006	Anderson Mesa	LONEOS	·	920 m	MPC · JPL
319487	2006 QX_{22}	—	August 19, 2006	Anderson Mesa	LONEOS	·	1.7 km	MPC · JPL
319488	2006 QK_{24}	—	August 17, 2006	Palomar	NEAT	·	960 m	MPC · JPL
319489	2006 QZ_{28}	—	August 21, 2006	Kitt Peak	Spacewatch	·	1.6 km	MPC · JPL
319490	2006 QL_{30}	—	August 20, 2006	Palomar	NEAT	·	2.4 km	MPC · JPL
319491	2006 QF_{37}	—	August 16, 2006	Siding Spring	SSS	·	1.5 km	MPC · JPL
319492	2006 QT_{44}	—	August 19, 2006	Anderson Mesa	LONEOS	·	1.5 km	MPC · JPL
319493	2006 QH_{45}	—	August 19, 2006	Kitt Peak	Spacewatch	·	1.1 km	MPC · JPL
319494	2006 QC_{49}	—	August 21, 2006	Palomar	NEAT	·	1.1 km	MPC · JPL
319495	2006 QW_{59}	—	August 19, 2006	Palomar	NEAT	·	870 m	MPC · JPL
319496	2006 QG_{63}	—	August 24, 2006	Socorro	LINEAR	·	1.3 km	MPC · JPL
319497	2006 QC_{72}	—	August 21, 2006	Kitt Peak	Spacewatch	V	680 m	MPC · JPL
319498	2006 QP_{79}	—	August 24, 2006	Socorro	LINEAR	·	1.0 km	MPC · JPL
319499	2006 QP_{81}	—	August 24, 2006	Palomar	NEAT	·	1.6 km	MPC · JPL
319500	2006 QY_{81}	—	August 24, 2006	Palomar	NEAT	·	860 m	MPC · JPL

== 319501–319600 ==
back to top

Designation			Discovery			Properties		Ref
Permanent	Provisional	Named after	Date	Site	Discoverer(s)	Category	Diam.	Ref
319501	2006 QA_{92}	—	August 16, 2006	Palomar	NEAT	(2076)	690 m	MPC · JPL
319502	2006 QS_{92}	—	August 16, 2006	Palomar	NEAT	TIR	4.3 km	MPC · JPL
319503	2006 QZ_{100}	—	August 26, 2006	Socorro	LINEAR	EUP	6.4 km	MPC · JPL
319504	2006 QU_{113}	—	August 24, 2006	Palomar	NEAT	·	870 m	MPC · JPL
319505	2006 QO_{117}	—	August 27, 2006	Anderson Mesa	LONEOS	·	870 m	MPC · JPL
319506	2006 QN_{123}	—	August 29, 2006	Catalina	CSS	PHO	2.2 km	MPC · JPL
319507	2006 QO_{123}	—	August 24, 2006	Socorro	LINEAR	·	1.1 km	MPC · JPL
319508	2006 QR_{126}	—	August 16, 2006	Palomar	NEAT	·	1.5 km	MPC · JPL
319509	2006 QA_{143}	—	August 31, 2006	Schiaparelli	Schiaparelli	V	780 m	MPC · JPL
319510	2006 QM_{144}	—	August 29, 2006	Catalina	CSS	·	2.2 km	MPC · JPL
319511	2006 QM_{145}	—	August 18, 2006	Kitt Peak	Spacewatch	·	1.1 km	MPC · JPL
319512	2006 QW_{146}	—	August 18, 2006	Kitt Peak	Spacewatch	·	770 m	MPC · JPL
319513	2006 QR_{148}	—	August 18, 2006	Kitt Peak	Spacewatch	·	1.1 km	MPC · JPL
319514	2006 QX_{156}	—	August 19, 2006	Kitt Peak	Spacewatch	THM	2.4 km	MPC · JPL
319515	2006 QC_{163}	—	August 29, 2006	Catalina	CSS	·	1.1 km	MPC · JPL
319516	2006 QV_{169}	—	August 28, 2006	Anderson Mesa	LONEOS	·	1.9 km	MPC · JPL
319517	2006 QD_{184}	—	August 28, 2006	Catalina	CSS	EUN	1.5 km	MPC · JPL
319518	2006 QR_{186}	—	August 18, 2006	Kitt Peak	Spacewatch	·	1.3 km	MPC · JPL
319519	2006 RJ	—	September 1, 2006	Plana	Fratev, F.	·	2.9 km	MPC · JPL
319520	2006 RT_{9}	—	September 13, 2006	Palomar	NEAT	·	770 m	MPC · JPL
319521	2006 RC_{22}	—	September 15, 2006	Catalina	CSS	·	2.2 km	MPC · JPL
319522	2006 RX_{22}	—	September 15, 2006	Palomar	NEAT	·	2.5 km	MPC · JPL
319523	2006 RB_{39}	—	September 14, 2006	Catalina	CSS	V	760 m	MPC · JPL
319524	2006 RN_{42}	—	September 14, 2006	Kitt Peak	Spacewatch	·	1.5 km	MPC · JPL
319525	2006 RC_{44}	—	September 14, 2006	Kitt Peak	Spacewatch	·	1.1 km	MPC · JPL
319526	2006 RB_{45}	—	September 14, 2006	Kitt Peak	Spacewatch	·	1.1 km	MPC · JPL
319527	2006 RE_{47}	—	September 14, 2006	Kitt Peak	Spacewatch	·	3.9 km	MPC · JPL
319528	2006 RC_{49}	—	September 14, 2006	Kitt Peak	Spacewatch	·	1.9 km	MPC · JPL
319529	2006 RF_{49}	—	September 14, 2006	Kitt Peak	Spacewatch	·	4.0 km	MPC · JPL
319530	2006 RS_{49}	—	September 14, 2006	Kitt Peak	Spacewatch	·	1.4 km	MPC · JPL
319531	2006 RN_{52}	—	September 14, 2006	Kitt Peak	Spacewatch	·	1.8 km	MPC · JPL
319532	2006 RE_{57}	—	September 14, 2006	Palomar	NEAT	·	3.0 km	MPC · JPL
319533	2006 RC_{58}	—	September 15, 2006	Kitt Peak	Spacewatch	·	1.5 km	MPC · JPL
319534	2006 RJ_{60}	—	September 14, 2006	Catalina	CSS	·	1.4 km	MPC · JPL
319535	2006 RF_{63}	—	September 14, 2006	Catalina	CSS	·	2.6 km	MPC · JPL
319536	2006 RK_{72}	—	September 15, 2006	Kitt Peak	Spacewatch	(5)	870 m	MPC · JPL
319537	2006 RG_{79}	—	September 15, 2006	Kitt Peak	Spacewatch	·	3.1 km	MPC · JPL
319538	2006 RG_{83}	—	September 15, 2006	Kitt Peak	Spacewatch	·	2.3 km	MPC · JPL
319539	2006 RN_{83}	—	September 15, 2006	Kitt Peak	Spacewatch	·	890 m	MPC · JPL
319540	2006 RP_{84}	—	September 15, 2006	Kitt Peak	Spacewatch	·	1.0 km	MPC · JPL
319541	2006 RB_{86}	—	September 15, 2006	Kitt Peak	Spacewatch	PHO	2.2 km	MPC · JPL
319542	2006 RA_{87}	—	September 15, 2006	Kitt Peak	Spacewatch	·	1.3 km	MPC · JPL
319543	2006 RA_{88}	—	February 29, 2004	Kitt Peak	Spacewatch	·	1.5 km	MPC · JPL
319544	2006 RV_{90}	—	September 15, 2006	Kitt Peak	Spacewatch	·	1.3 km	MPC · JPL
319545	2006 RW_{94}	—	September 15, 2006	Kitt Peak	Spacewatch	·	1.5 km	MPC · JPL
319546	2006 RE_{99}	—	September 15, 2006	Kitt Peak	Spacewatch	NYS	1.2 km	MPC · JPL
319547	2006 RF_{104}	—	September 11, 2006	Apache Point	A. C. Becker	·	1.3 km	MPC · JPL
319548	2006 RA_{105}	—	September 15, 2006	Kitt Peak	Spacewatch	·	1.3 km	MPC · JPL
319549	2006 RP_{105}	—	September 14, 2006	Mauna Kea	Masiero, J.	MAS	670 m	MPC · JPL
319550	2006 RM_{106}	—	September 14, 2006	Mauna Kea	Masiero, J.	NYS	1.1 km	MPC · JPL
319551	2006 RH_{116}	—	September 14, 2006	Mauna Kea	Masiero, J.	·	1.3 km	MPC · JPL
319552	2006 RL_{120}	—	September 14, 2006	Kitt Peak	Spacewatch	·	1.2 km	MPC · JPL
319553	2006 SU_{11}	—	July 22, 2006	Mount Lemmon	Mount Lemmon Survey	·	1.8 km	MPC · JPL
319554	2006 SP_{14}	—	September 17, 2006	Catalina	CSS	HNS	1.1 km	MPC · JPL
319555	2006 SS_{14}	—	September 17, 2006	Catalina	CSS	·	990 m	MPC · JPL
319556	2006 SA_{20}	—	September 18, 2006	Calvin-Rehoboth	Calvin College	BRG	1.2 km	MPC · JPL
319557	2006 SO_{28}	—	September 17, 2006	Kitt Peak	Spacewatch	·	810 m	MPC · JPL
319558	2006 SO_{33}	—	September 17, 2006	Catalina	CSS	·	1.8 km	MPC · JPL
319559	2006 SN_{34}	—	September 17, 2006	Catalina	CSS	NYS	1.1 km	MPC · JPL
319560	2006 ST_{35}	—	September 17, 2006	Anderson Mesa	LONEOS	·	2.0 km	MPC · JPL
319561	2006 SP_{39}	—	September 18, 2006	Socorro	LINEAR	V	670 m	MPC · JPL
319562	2006 SW_{42}	—	September 18, 2006	Catalina	CSS	JUN	1.6 km	MPC · JPL
319563	2006 SK_{44}	—	September 17, 2006	Catalina	CSS	·	1.9 km	MPC · JPL
319564	2006 SZ_{44}	—	August 28, 2006	Catalina	CSS	·	1.4 km	MPC · JPL
319565	2006 ST_{48}	—	September 17, 2006	Anderson Mesa	LONEOS	·	1.9 km	MPC · JPL
319566	2006 SH_{49}	—	September 19, 2006	Catalina	CSS	·	1.3 km	MPC · JPL
319567	2006 ST_{63}	—	September 18, 2006	Anderson Mesa	LONEOS	·	1.5 km	MPC · JPL
319568	2006 SO_{74}	—	September 19, 2006	Kitt Peak	Spacewatch	·	1.6 km	MPC · JPL
319569	2006 SF_{86}	—	September 18, 2006	Kitt Peak	Spacewatch	·	1.3 km	MPC · JPL
319570	2006 SW_{86}	—	September 18, 2006	Kitt Peak	Spacewatch	·	1.7 km	MPC · JPL
319571	2006 SQ_{87}	—	September 18, 2006	Kitt Peak	Spacewatch	·	890 m	MPC · JPL
319572	2006 SL_{88}	—	September 18, 2006	Kitt Peak	Spacewatch	·	1.5 km	MPC · JPL
319573	2006 SZ_{89}	—	September 18, 2006	Kitt Peak	Spacewatch	·	1.0 km	MPC · JPL
319574	2006 SA_{90}	—	September 18, 2006	Kitt Peak	Spacewatch	·	1.3 km	MPC · JPL
319575	2006 SD_{90}	—	September 18, 2006	Kitt Peak	Spacewatch	·	1.0 km	MPC · JPL
319576	2006 SY_{94}	—	September 18, 2006	Kitt Peak	Spacewatch	(7744)	1.1 km	MPC · JPL
319577	2006 SC_{96}	—	September 18, 2006	Kitt Peak	Spacewatch	·	1.2 km	MPC · JPL
319578	2006 SW_{96}	—	September 18, 2006	Kitt Peak	Spacewatch	·	850 m	MPC · JPL
319579	2006 SS_{97}	—	September 18, 2006	Kitt Peak	Spacewatch	HNS	1.2 km	MPC · JPL
319580	2006 SG_{101}	—	September 19, 2006	Kitt Peak	Spacewatch	MAS	810 m	MPC · JPL
319581	2006 SL_{107}	—	September 19, 2006	Catalina	CSS	·	3.4 km	MPC · JPL
319582	2006 SW_{108}	—	September 19, 2006	Kitt Peak	Spacewatch	EUN	1.4 km	MPC · JPL
319583	2006 SB_{116}	—	September 24, 2006	Anderson Mesa	LONEOS	·	2.0 km	MPC · JPL
319584	2006 SD_{119}	—	September 18, 2006	Catalina	CSS	·	1.7 km	MPC · JPL
319585	2006 SG_{119}	—	September 18, 2006	Catalina	CSS	ADE	1.9 km	MPC · JPL
319586	2006 SQ_{122}	—	September 19, 2006	Anderson Mesa	LONEOS	·	3.1 km	MPC · JPL
319587	2006 SA_{126}	—	September 20, 2006	Palomar	NEAT	·	1.8 km	MPC · JPL
319588	2006 SN_{130}	—	September 20, 2006	Anderson Mesa	LONEOS	·	1.4 km	MPC · JPL
319589	2006 SG_{149}	—	September 19, 2006	Kitt Peak	Spacewatch	·	870 m	MPC · JPL
319590	2006 SA_{157}	—	September 23, 2006	Kitt Peak	Spacewatch	·	1.5 km	MPC · JPL
319591	2006 SU_{162}	—	September 24, 2006	Kitt Peak	Spacewatch	·	660 m	MPC · JPL
319592	2006 SY_{163}	—	September 25, 2006	Kitt Peak	Spacewatch	EOS ·	5.1 km	MPC · JPL
319593	2006 SP_{165}	—	September 25, 2006	Kitt Peak	Spacewatch	RAF	880 m	MPC · JPL
319594	2006 ST_{173}	—	September 25, 2006	Socorro	LINEAR	V	860 m	MPC · JPL
319595	2006 SZ_{178}	—	September 25, 2006	Kitt Peak	Spacewatch	THM	2.8 km	MPC · JPL
319596	2006 SS_{179}	—	September 25, 2006	Kitt Peak	Spacewatch	·	1.3 km	MPC · JPL
319597	2006 SB_{184}	—	September 25, 2006	Kitt Peak	Spacewatch	·	1.3 km	MPC · JPL
319598	2006 SJ_{184}	—	September 25, 2006	Kitt Peak	Spacewatch	·	1.0 km	MPC · JPL
319599	2006 ST_{187}	—	September 26, 2006	Kitt Peak	Spacewatch	MAS	760 m	MPC · JPL
319600	2006 SW_{192}	—	September 26, 2006	Mount Lemmon	Mount Lemmon Survey	·	3.7 km	MPC · JPL

== 319601–319700 ==
back to top

Designation			Discovery			Properties		Ref
Permanent	Provisional	Named after	Date	Site	Discoverer(s)	Category	Diam.	Ref
319601 Šilutė	2006 SP_{197}	Šilutė	September 25, 2006	Moletai	K. Černis, J. Zdanavičius	·	1.3 km	MPC · JPL
319602	2006 SB_{200}	—	September 24, 2006	Kitt Peak	Spacewatch	·	1.3 km	MPC · JPL
319603	2006 SD_{201}	—	September 24, 2006	Kitt Peak	Spacewatch	·	1.4 km	MPC · JPL
319604	2006 SN_{212}	—	September 26, 2006	Catalina	CSS	·	5.6 km	MPC · JPL
319605	2006 SB_{217}	—	September 28, 2006	Kitt Peak	Spacewatch	(5)	1.1 km	MPC · JPL
319606	2006 SA_{226}	—	September 26, 2006	Kitt Peak	Spacewatch	·	1.3 km	MPC · JPL
319607	2006 SS_{226}	—	September 26, 2006	Kitt Peak	Spacewatch	·	1.2 km	MPC · JPL
319608	2006 SS_{235}	—	September 26, 2006	Mount Lemmon	Mount Lemmon Survey	·	1.4 km	MPC · JPL
319609	2006 SE_{238}	—	September 26, 2006	Kitt Peak	Spacewatch	·	2.6 km	MPC · JPL
319610	2006 SU_{241}	—	September 26, 2006	Mount Lemmon	Mount Lemmon Survey	·	1.0 km	MPC · JPL
319611	2006 SF_{253}	—	September 26, 2006	Mount Lemmon	Mount Lemmon Survey	·	3.3 km	MPC · JPL
319612	2006 SL_{261}	—	September 26, 2006	Kitt Peak	Spacewatch	HYG	2.9 km	MPC · JPL
319613	2006 SJ_{268}	—	September 26, 2006	Kitt Peak	Spacewatch	·	1.4 km	MPC · JPL
319614	2006 SW_{273}	—	September 27, 2006	Mount Lemmon	Mount Lemmon Survey	(5)	1.4 km	MPC · JPL
319615	2006 SW_{277}	—	September 28, 2006	Socorro	LINEAR	(5)	1.3 km	MPC · JPL
319616	2006 SN_{279}	—	September 28, 2006	Kitt Peak	Spacewatch	V	850 m	MPC · JPL
319617	2006 SU_{279}	—	September 28, 2006	Catalina	CSS	JUN	1.3 km	MPC · JPL
319618	2006 SG_{280}	—	September 29, 2006	Anderson Mesa	LONEOS	·	1.6 km	MPC · JPL
319619	2006 SY_{284}	—	September 29, 2006	Anderson Mesa	LONEOS	·	1.6 km	MPC · JPL
319620	2006 SP_{288}	—	September 26, 2006	Catalina	CSS	EUN	1.3 km	MPC · JPL
319621	2006 SC_{297}	—	September 25, 2006	Kitt Peak	Spacewatch	·	1.4 km	MPC · JPL
319622	2006 SM_{301}	—	September 26, 2006	Catalina	CSS	·	1.7 km	MPC · JPL
319623	2006 ST_{303}	—	September 27, 2006	Mount Lemmon	Mount Lemmon Survey	·	970 m	MPC · JPL
319624	2006 SU_{306}	—	September 27, 2006	Mount Lemmon	Mount Lemmon Survey	NYS	1.3 km	MPC · JPL
319625	2006 SV_{311}	—	September 27, 2006	Kitt Peak	Spacewatch	·	1.1 km	MPC · JPL
319626	2006 SC_{328}	—	September 27, 2006	Kitt Peak	Spacewatch	NYS	1.1 km	MPC · JPL
319627	2006 SE_{332}	—	September 28, 2006	Mount Lemmon	Mount Lemmon Survey	NYS	1.3 km	MPC · JPL
319628	2006 SR_{335}	—	September 28, 2006	Kitt Peak	Spacewatch	·	1.2 km	MPC · JPL
319629	2006 SG_{353}	—	September 30, 2006	Catalina	CSS	·	2.5 km	MPC · JPL
319630	2006 SA_{360}	—	September 30, 2006	Catalina	CSS	·	1.4 km	MPC · JPL
319631	2006 SS_{360}	—	September 30, 2006	Mount Lemmon	Mount Lemmon Survey	·	1.6 km	MPC · JPL
319632	2006 SN_{361}	—	September 30, 2006	Mount Lemmon	Mount Lemmon Survey	JUN	960 m	MPC · JPL
319633	2006 SJ_{366}	—	September 30, 2006	Mount Lemmon	Mount Lemmon Survey	·	2.1 km	MPC · JPL
319634	2006 SR_{366}	—	September 16, 2006	Catalina	CSS	KON	2.2 km	MPC · JPL
319635	2006 SC_{367}	—	September 25, 2006	Catalina	CSS	EUN	1.5 km	MPC · JPL
319636 Dziewulski	2006 SE_{368}	Dziewulski	September 23, 2006	Moletai	K. Černis, J. Zdanavičius	·	3.5 km	MPC · JPL
319637	2006 SM_{376}	—	September 17, 2006	Apache Point	A. C. Becker	·	1.2 km	MPC · JPL
319638	2006 SL_{388}	—	September 30, 2006	Apache Point	SDSS Collaboration	·	1.6 km	MPC · JPL
319639	2006 SU_{390}	—	September 17, 2006	Catalina	CSS	·	1.2 km	MPC · JPL
319640	2006 SV_{391}	—	September 19, 2006	Catalina	CSS	·	1.7 km	MPC · JPL
319641	2006 SY_{391}	—	September 19, 2006	Catalina	CSS	·	2.0 km	MPC · JPL
319642	2006 SO_{393}	—	September 28, 2006	Mount Lemmon	Mount Lemmon Survey	·	1.6 km	MPC · JPL
319643	2006 SM_{399}	—	September 17, 2006	Kitt Peak	Spacewatch	·	1.8 km	MPC · JPL
319644	2006 SB_{400}	—	September 18, 2006	Catalina	CSS	·	1.8 km	MPC · JPL
319645	2006 SN_{403}	—	September 27, 2006	Mount Lemmon	Mount Lemmon Survey	·	1.6 km	MPC · JPL
319646	2006 SL_{404}	—	September 30, 2006	Mount Lemmon	Mount Lemmon Survey	·	1.4 km	MPC · JPL
319647	2006 SW_{410}	—	September 19, 2006	Kitt Peak	Spacewatch	·	1.7 km	MPC · JPL
319648	2006 SA_{412}	—	September 30, 2006	Catalina	CSS	·	2.3 km	MPC · JPL
319649	2006 SC_{412}	—	December 8, 2002	Palomar	NEAT	·	1.7 km	MPC · JPL
319650	2006 SR_{412}	—	September 25, 2006	Catalina	CSS	·	2.7 km	MPC · JPL
319651 Topografo	2006 TO_{7}	Topografo	October 10, 2006	San Marcello	L. Tesi, M. T. Mazzucato	·	1.0 km	MPC · JPL
319652	2006 TE_{13}	—	October 10, 2006	Palomar	NEAT	·	1.7 km	MPC · JPL
319653	2006 TG_{14}	—	October 10, 2006	Palomar	NEAT	·	1.4 km	MPC · JPL
319654	2006 TA_{16}	—	October 11, 2006	Kitt Peak	Spacewatch	(5)	1.2 km	MPC · JPL
319655	2006 TR_{22}	—	October 11, 2006	Kitt Peak	Spacewatch	·	2.2 km	MPC · JPL
319656	2006 TO_{25}	—	October 12, 2006	Kitt Peak	Spacewatch	·	5.5 km	MPC · JPL
319657	2006 TZ_{25}	—	October 12, 2006	Kitt Peak	Spacewatch	·	1.1 km	MPC · JPL
319658	2006 TA_{26}	—	October 12, 2006	Kitt Peak	Spacewatch	·	1.2 km	MPC · JPL
319659	2006 TV_{27}	—	October 12, 2006	Kitt Peak	Spacewatch	·	1.7 km	MPC · JPL
319660	2006 TH_{30}	—	October 12, 2006	Kitt Peak	Spacewatch	(5)	1.5 km	MPC · JPL
319661	2006 TP_{32}	—	October 12, 2006	Kitt Peak	Spacewatch	·	970 m	MPC · JPL
319662	2006 TZ_{34}	—	October 12, 2006	Kitt Peak	Spacewatch	(5)	1.8 km	MPC · JPL
319663	2006 TS_{35}	—	October 12, 2006	Kitt Peak	Spacewatch	MAR	1.6 km	MPC · JPL
319664	2006 TA_{41}	—	October 12, 2006	Kitt Peak	Spacewatch	·	1.6 km	MPC · JPL
319665	2006 TJ_{42}	—	October 12, 2006	Kitt Peak	Spacewatch	·	1.1 km	MPC · JPL
319666	2006 TD_{43}	—	October 12, 2006	Kitt Peak	Spacewatch	·	1.7 km	MPC · JPL
319667	2006 TO_{45}	—	October 12, 2006	Kitt Peak	Spacewatch	·	1.5 km	MPC · JPL
319668	2006 TS_{46}	—	October 12, 2006	Kitt Peak	Spacewatch	·	1.6 km	MPC · JPL
319669	2006 TY_{47}	—	October 12, 2006	Kitt Peak	Spacewatch	·	1.4 km	MPC · JPL
319670	2006 TJ_{51}	—	October 12, 2006	Kitt Peak	Spacewatch	·	820 m	MPC · JPL
319671	2006 TV_{51}	—	October 12, 2006	Kitt Peak	Spacewatch	·	2.0 km	MPC · JPL
319672	2006 TQ_{61}	—	October 12, 2006	Palomar	NEAT	MRX	920 m	MPC · JPL
319673	2006 TZ_{66}	—	November 14, 2002	Palomar	NEAT	·	1.4 km	MPC · JPL
319674	2006 TX_{71}	—	October 11, 2006	Palomar	NEAT	MAR	1.2 km	MPC · JPL
319675	2006 TH_{74}	—	October 11, 2006	Palomar	NEAT	HYG	3.3 km	MPC · JPL
319676	2006 TX_{75}	—	October 11, 2006	Palomar	NEAT	·	2.2 km	MPC · JPL
319677	2006 TL_{76}	—	October 11, 2006	Palomar	NEAT	EUN	1.7 km	MPC · JPL
319678	2006 TE_{77}	—	October 11, 2006	Palomar	NEAT	·	1.8 km	MPC · JPL
319679	2006 TT_{78}	—	October 12, 2006	Palomar	NEAT	EUN	1.6 km	MPC · JPL
319680	2006 TV_{80}	—	October 13, 2006	Kitt Peak	Spacewatch	·	1.5 km	MPC · JPL
319681	2006 TU_{86}	—	October 13, 2006	Kitt Peak	Spacewatch	NYS	1.4 km	MPC · JPL
319682	2006 TL_{88}	—	October 13, 2006	Kitt Peak	Spacewatch	(5)	1.6 km	MPC · JPL
319683	2006 TL_{89}	—	October 13, 2006	Kitt Peak	Spacewatch	·	1.4 km	MPC · JPL
319684	2006 TU_{89}	—	October 13, 2006	Kitt Peak	Spacewatch	·	1.6 km	MPC · JPL
319685	2006 TB_{91}	—	October 13, 2006	Kitt Peak	Spacewatch	·	1.5 km	MPC · JPL
319686	2006 TS_{92}	—	October 15, 2006	Kitt Peak	Spacewatch	·	1.3 km	MPC · JPL
319687	2006 TL_{94}	—	October 15, 2006	Lulin	Lin, C.-S., Q. Ye	·	1.6 km	MPC · JPL
319688	2006 TL_{95}	—	October 3, 2006	Siding Spring	SSS	H	780 m	MPC · JPL
319689	2006 TH_{100}	—	October 15, 2006	Kitt Peak	Spacewatch	·	1.2 km	MPC · JPL
319690	2006 TF_{102}	—	September 28, 2006	Mount Lemmon	Mount Lemmon Survey	·	1.6 km	MPC · JPL
319691	2006 TS_{103}	—	October 15, 2006	Kitt Peak	Spacewatch	·	1.3 km	MPC · JPL
319692	2006 TJ_{105}	—	October 15, 2006	Kitt Peak	Spacewatch	fast	840 m	MPC · JPL
319693	2006 TL_{110}	—	October 13, 2006	Kitt Peak	Spacewatch	·	1.8 km	MPC · JPL
319694	2006 TN_{110}	—	October 13, 2006	Kitt Peak	Spacewatch	·	2.3 km	MPC · JPL
319695	2006 TF_{115}	—	October 1, 2006	Apache Point	A. C. Becker	·	3.0 km	MPC · JPL
319696	2006 TC_{118}	—	October 3, 2006	Apache Point	A. C. Becker	·	2.2 km	MPC · JPL
319697	2006 TR_{125}	—	October 13, 2006	Kitt Peak	Spacewatch	·	1.6 km	MPC · JPL
319698	2006 TJ_{129}	—	October 13, 2006	Kitt Peak	Spacewatch	·	1.3 km	MPC · JPL
319699	2006 UF_{3}	—	October 16, 2006	Catalina	CSS	·	1.3 km	MPC · JPL
319700	2006 UZ_{4}	—	October 16, 2006	Kitt Peak	Spacewatch	·	1.4 km	MPC · JPL

== 319701–319800 ==
back to top

Designation			Discovery			Properties		Ref
Permanent	Provisional	Named after	Date	Site	Discoverer(s)	Category	Diam.	Ref
319701	2006 UQ_{6}	—	October 16, 2006	Catalina	CSS	·	1.4 km	MPC · JPL
319702	2006 UQ_{22}	—	October 16, 2006	Mount Lemmon	Mount Lemmon Survey	ADE	1.9 km	MPC · JPL
319703	2006 UA_{23}	—	March 7, 2003	Socorro	LINEAR	·	1.6 km	MPC · JPL
319704	2006 UT_{24}	—	October 16, 2006	Kitt Peak	Spacewatch	·	1.2 km	MPC · JPL
319705	2006 UF_{25}	—	October 16, 2006	Kitt Peak	Spacewatch	·	1.4 km	MPC · JPL
319706	2006 UN_{27}	—	October 16, 2006	Kitt Peak	Spacewatch	·	1.0 km	MPC · JPL
319707	2006 UL_{28}	—	October 16, 2006	Kitt Peak	Spacewatch	(5)	1.4 km	MPC · JPL
319708	2006 UV_{30}	—	October 16, 2006	Kitt Peak	Spacewatch	·	1.2 km	MPC · JPL
319709	2006 UU_{34}	—	October 16, 2006	Kitt Peak	Spacewatch	·	1.2 km	MPC · JPL
319710	2006 UJ_{38}	—	October 16, 2006	Kitt Peak	Spacewatch	·	1.0 km	MPC · JPL
319711	2006 UD_{41}	—	October 16, 2006	Kitt Peak	Spacewatch	·	1.7 km	MPC · JPL
319712	2006 UN_{44}	—	October 16, 2006	Kitt Peak	Spacewatch	·	1.3 km	MPC · JPL
319713	2006 UV_{45}	—	October 16, 2006	Kitt Peak	Spacewatch	·	1.1 km	MPC · JPL
319714	2006 UP_{48}	—	October 17, 2006	Kitt Peak	Spacewatch	RAF	1.1 km	MPC · JPL
319715	2006 UM_{50}	—	October 17, 2006	Kitt Peak	Spacewatch	·	1.3 km	MPC · JPL
319716	2006 UR_{52}	—	October 17, 2006	Catalina	CSS	·	1.3 km	MPC · JPL
319717	2006 UW_{56}	—	October 18, 2006	Kitt Peak	Spacewatch	·	1.8 km	MPC · JPL
319718	2006 UX_{56}	—	October 18, 2006	Kitt Peak	Spacewatch	·	1.5 km	MPC · JPL
319719	2006 UX_{60}	—	October 19, 2006	Mount Lemmon	Mount Lemmon Survey	·	1.3 km	MPC · JPL
319720	2006 UF_{61}	—	October 19, 2006	Mount Lemmon	Mount Lemmon Survey	·	1.7 km	MPC · JPL
319721	2006 UN_{71}	—	October 16, 2006	Bergisch Gladbach	W. Bickel	·	1.5 km	MPC · JPL
319722	2006 UO_{75}	—	October 17, 2006	Mount Lemmon	Mount Lemmon Survey	·	1.6 km	MPC · JPL
319723	2006 UX_{80}	—	October 17, 2006	Mount Lemmon	Mount Lemmon Survey	·	1.3 km	MPC · JPL
319724	2006 UY_{80}	—	October 17, 2006	Mount Lemmon	Mount Lemmon Survey	·	1.4 km	MPC · JPL
319725	2006 UT_{81}	—	October 17, 2006	Mount Lemmon	Mount Lemmon Survey	·	1.6 km	MPC · JPL
319726	2006 UO_{87}	—	October 17, 2006	Mount Lemmon	Mount Lemmon Survey	·	1.5 km	MPC · JPL
319727	2006 UG_{93}	—	October 18, 2006	Kitt Peak	Spacewatch	·	1.3 km	MPC · JPL
319728	2006 UV_{95}	—	October 18, 2006	Kitt Peak	Spacewatch	·	1.5 km	MPC · JPL
319729	2006 UK_{104}	—	October 18, 2006	Kitt Peak	Spacewatch	·	1.4 km	MPC · JPL
319730	2006 UP_{108}	—	October 18, 2006	Kitt Peak	Spacewatch	·	1.8 km	MPC · JPL
319731	2006 UF_{112}	—	October 19, 2006	Kitt Peak	Spacewatch	·	1.5 km	MPC · JPL
319732	2006 UB_{115}	—	October 2, 2006	Kitt Peak	Spacewatch	·	1.1 km	MPC · JPL
319733	2006 UA_{117}	—	October 19, 2006	Kitt Peak	Spacewatch	·	1.1 km	MPC · JPL
319734	2006 UN_{118}	—	October 19, 2006	Kitt Peak	Spacewatch	·	960 m	MPC · JPL
319735	2006 UU_{120}	—	October 19, 2006	Kitt Peak	Spacewatch	·	3.4 km	MPC · JPL
319736	2006 UV_{120}	—	October 19, 2006	Kitt Peak	Spacewatch	·	1.4 km	MPC · JPL
319737	2006 UP_{124}	—	October 19, 2006	Mount Lemmon	Mount Lemmon Survey	(5)	1.2 km	MPC · JPL
319738	2006 UY_{127}	—	October 19, 2006	Kitt Peak	Spacewatch	·	1.7 km	MPC · JPL
319739	2006 UU_{128}	—	October 19, 2006	Kitt Peak	Spacewatch	·	1.3 km	MPC · JPL
319740	2006 UP_{134}	—	October 19, 2006	Kitt Peak	Spacewatch	·	1.4 km	MPC · JPL
319741	2006 UP_{135}	—	October 19, 2006	Kitt Peak	Spacewatch	·	1.3 km	MPC · JPL
319742	2006 UU_{136}	—	October 19, 2006	Mount Lemmon	Mount Lemmon Survey	·	1.4 km	MPC · JPL
319743	2006 UA_{137}	—	October 19, 2006	Catalina	CSS	·	2.0 km	MPC · JPL
319744	2006 UT_{140}	—	March 29, 2001	Kitt Peak	Spacewatch	·	770 m	MPC · JPL
319745	2006 UL_{143}	—	October 19, 2006	Palomar	NEAT	·	1.7 km	MPC · JPL
319746	2006 UO_{143}	—	October 19, 2006	Mount Lemmon	Mount Lemmon Survey	·	1.6 km	MPC · JPL
319747	2006 UP_{147}	—	October 20, 2006	Kitt Peak	Spacewatch	·	1.4 km	MPC · JPL
319748	2006 UP_{152}	—	October 21, 2006	Kitt Peak	Spacewatch	·	1.8 km	MPC · JPL
319749	2006 UW_{164}	—	October 21, 2006	Mount Lemmon	Mount Lemmon Survey	·	1.6 km	MPC · JPL
319750	2006 UF_{172}	—	October 21, 2006	Kitt Peak	Spacewatch	·	1.3 km	MPC · JPL
319751	2006 UG_{174}	—	October 19, 2006	Mount Lemmon	Mount Lemmon Survey	·	1.8 km	MPC · JPL
319752	2006 UW_{177}	—	October 16, 2006	Catalina	CSS	·	1.6 km	MPC · JPL
319753	2006 UU_{178}	—	October 16, 2006	Catalina	CSS	·	1.4 km	MPC · JPL
319754	2006 UZ_{178}	—	October 16, 2006	Catalina	CSS	ADE	2.4 km	MPC · JPL
319755	2006 UC_{181}	—	October 16, 2006	Catalina	CSS	EUN	1.4 km	MPC · JPL
319756	2006 UY_{183}	—	October 19, 2006	Catalina	CSS	·	1.9 km	MPC · JPL
319757	2006 UB_{184}	—	October 19, 2006	Palomar	NEAT	·	1.2 km	MPC · JPL
319758	2006 UK_{191}	—	October 19, 2006	Catalina	CSS	·	2.0 km	MPC · JPL
319759	2006 UX_{191}	—	October 19, 2006	Catalina	CSS	·	1.6 km	MPC · JPL
319760	2006 US_{196}	—	October 20, 2006	Kitt Peak	Spacewatch	·	2.3 km	MPC · JPL
319761	2006 UY_{203}	—	October 22, 2006	Palomar	NEAT	·	2.4 km	MPC · JPL
319762	2006 UG_{207}	—	October 23, 2006	Kitt Peak	Spacewatch	·	1.0 km	MPC · JPL
319763	2006 UQ_{208}	—	October 23, 2006	Kitt Peak	Spacewatch	·	710 m	MPC · JPL
319764	2006 UP_{211}	—	October 23, 2006	Palomar	NEAT	·	1.6 km	MPC · JPL
319765	2006 UJ_{214}	—	October 23, 2006	Kitt Peak	Spacewatch	·	1.3 km	MPC · JPL
319766	2006 UT_{214}	—	October 24, 2006	Palomar	NEAT	·	1.5 km	MPC · JPL
319767	2006 UZ_{214}	—	October 24, 2006	Wildberg	R. Apitzsch	·	1.1 km	MPC · JPL
319768	2006 UW_{226}	—	October 20, 2006	Kitt Peak	Spacewatch	·	1.4 km	MPC · JPL
319769	2006 UD_{229}	—	October 20, 2006	Palomar	NEAT	·	1.7 km	MPC · JPL
319770	2006 UH_{229}	—	October 20, 2006	Palomar	NEAT	·	1.4 km	MPC · JPL
319771	2006 UY_{255}	—	October 27, 2006	Mount Lemmon	Mount Lemmon Survey	·	1.1 km	MPC · JPL
319772	2006 UG_{258}	—	October 28, 2006	Mount Lemmon	Mount Lemmon Survey	NYS	1.3 km	MPC · JPL
319773	2006 UM_{264}	—	October 27, 2006	Kitt Peak	Spacewatch	NYS	1.2 km	MPC · JPL
319774	2006 UJ_{265}	—	October 27, 2006	Mount Lemmon	Mount Lemmon Survey	·	1.1 km	MPC · JPL
319775	2006 UC_{267}	—	October 27, 2006	Catalina	CSS	·	1.6 km	MPC · JPL
319776	2006 UH_{272}	—	October 27, 2006	Mount Lemmon	Mount Lemmon Survey	·	1.1 km	MPC · JPL
319777	2006 UF_{273}	—	October 27, 2006	Kitt Peak	Spacewatch	·	1.6 km	MPC · JPL
319778	2006 UX_{278}	—	October 28, 2006	Kitt Peak	Spacewatch	·	1.2 km	MPC · JPL
319779	2006 UZ_{282}	—	October 28, 2006	Kitt Peak	Spacewatch	·	1.5 km	MPC · JPL
319780	2006 UA_{283}	—	October 28, 2006	Kitt Peak	Spacewatch	·	1.5 km	MPC · JPL
319781	2006 UK_{284}	—	October 28, 2006	Kitt Peak	Spacewatch	·	2.2 km	MPC · JPL
319782	2006 UV_{286}	—	October 28, 2006	Kitt Peak	Spacewatch	(5)	1.6 km	MPC · JPL
319783	2006 UU_{289}	—	October 27, 2006	Kitt Peak	Spacewatch	·	2.0 km	MPC · JPL
319784	2006 US_{305}	—	October 19, 2006	Kitt Peak	M. W. Buie	·	970 m	MPC · JPL
319785	2006 UG_{328}	—	October 17, 2006	Catalina	CSS	·	1.9 km	MPC · JPL
319786	2006 UE_{332}	—	October 21, 2006	Apache Point	A. C. Becker	·	1.5 km	MPC · JPL
319787	2006 UD_{333}	—	October 21, 2006	Apache Point	A. C. Becker	·	1.7 km	MPC · JPL
319788	2006 UM_{333}	—	October 22, 2006	Apache Point	A. C. Becker	HYG	3.6 km	MPC · JPL
319789	2006 UJ_{336}	—	October 20, 2006	Mount Lemmon	Mount Lemmon Survey	·	1.6 km	MPC · JPL
319790	2006 UL_{336}	—	October 20, 2006	Kitt Peak	Spacewatch	NYS	1.5 km	MPC · JPL
319791	2006 UB_{337}	—	October 27, 2006	Mount Lemmon	Mount Lemmon Survey	·	1.5 km	MPC · JPL
319792	2006 UG_{338}	—	October 27, 2006	Mount Lemmon	Mount Lemmon Survey	·	1.3 km	MPC · JPL
319793	2006 UL_{361}	—	October 23, 2006	Catalina	CSS	·	1.8 km	MPC · JPL
319794	2006 VW_{3}	—	November 9, 2006	Kitt Peak	Spacewatch	NYS	1.4 km	MPC · JPL
319795	2006 VJ_{5}	—	November 10, 2006	Kitt Peak	Spacewatch	·	1.2 km	MPC · JPL
319796	2006 VK_{6}	—	November 10, 2006	Kitt Peak	Spacewatch	V	890 m	MPC · JPL
319797	2006 VH_{14}	—	November 15, 2006	Remanzacco	Remanzacco	·	2.5 km	MPC · JPL
319798	2006 VJ_{14}	—	November 15, 2006	Wrightwood	J. W. Young	·	1.0 km	MPC · JPL
319799	2006 VS_{16}	—	November 9, 2006	Kitt Peak	Spacewatch	·	1.2 km	MPC · JPL
319800	2006 VE_{21}	—	November 10, 2006	Kitt Peak	Spacewatch	·	990 m	MPC · JPL

== 319801–319900 ==
back to top

Designation			Discovery			Properties		Ref
Permanent	Provisional	Named after	Date	Site	Discoverer(s)	Category	Diam.	Ref
319801	2006 VS_{30}	—	November 1, 2006	Mount Lemmon	Mount Lemmon Survey	·	2.1 km	MPC · JPL
319802	2006 VY_{34}	—	November 11, 2006	Mount Lemmon	Mount Lemmon Survey	·	1.5 km	MPC · JPL
319803	2006 VV_{36}	—	November 11, 2006	Catalina	CSS	·	1.7 km	MPC · JPL
319804	2006 VR_{45}	—	November 11, 2006	Palomar	NEAT	·	1.5 km	MPC · JPL
319805	2006 VZ_{47}	—	November 10, 2006	Kitt Peak	Spacewatch	·	1.1 km	MPC · JPL
319806	2006 VY_{48}	—	November 10, 2006	Kitt Peak	Spacewatch	·	2.0 km	MPC · JPL
319807	2006 VJ_{50}	—	November 10, 2006	Kitt Peak	Spacewatch	MIS	1.8 km	MPC · JPL
319808	2006 VN_{50}	—	November 10, 2006	Kitt Peak	Spacewatch	EUN	2.0 km	MPC · JPL
319809	2006 VX_{50}	—	November 10, 2006	Kitt Peak	Spacewatch	·	2.3 km	MPC · JPL
319810	2006 VQ_{52}	—	November 11, 2006	Kitt Peak	Spacewatch	·	3.2 km	MPC · JPL
319811	2006 VB_{54}	—	November 11, 2006	Kitt Peak	Spacewatch	·	1.3 km	MPC · JPL
319812	2006 VA_{60}	—	November 11, 2006	Kitt Peak	Spacewatch	·	1.4 km	MPC · JPL
319813	2006 VE_{61}	—	November 11, 2006	Kitt Peak	Spacewatch	V	920 m	MPC · JPL
319814	2006 VB_{66}	—	November 11, 2006	Kitt Peak	Spacewatch	·	1.4 km	MPC · JPL
319815	2006 VV_{67}	—	November 11, 2006	Catalina	CSS	·	2.0 km	MPC · JPL
319816	2006 VS_{80}	—	November 12, 2006	Mount Lemmon	Mount Lemmon Survey	·	1.4 km	MPC · JPL
319817	2006 VH_{83}	—	September 27, 2006	Mount Lemmon	Mount Lemmon Survey	·	1.1 km	MPC · JPL
319818	2006 VK_{83}	—	November 13, 2006	Kitt Peak	Spacewatch	·	1.3 km	MPC · JPL
319819	2006 VN_{92}	—	November 15, 2006	Catalina	CSS	·	1.8 km	MPC · JPL
319820	2006 VD_{99}	—	November 11, 2006	Mount Lemmon	Mount Lemmon Survey	·	1.6 km	MPC · JPL
319821	2006 VT_{104}	—	November 13, 2006	Catalina	CSS	·	1.8 km	MPC · JPL
319822	2006 VA_{105}	—	November 13, 2006	Kitt Peak	Spacewatch	·	2.0 km	MPC · JPL
319823	2006 VH_{105}	—	November 13, 2006	Kitt Peak	Spacewatch	·	1.6 km	MPC · JPL
319824	2006 VC_{110}	—	November 13, 2006	Kitt Peak	Spacewatch	(5)	1.7 km	MPC · JPL
319825	2006 VQ_{110}	—	November 13, 2006	Kitt Peak	Spacewatch	·	1.4 km	MPC · JPL
319826	2006 VM_{115}	—	November 14, 2006	Kitt Peak	Spacewatch	·	1.4 km	MPC · JPL
319827	2006 VW_{115}	—	November 14, 2006	Kitt Peak	Spacewatch	·	1.5 km	MPC · JPL
319828	2006 VU_{117}	—	November 14, 2006	Kitt Peak	Spacewatch	·	1.7 km	MPC · JPL
319829	2006 VT_{122}	—	November 14, 2006	Kitt Peak	Spacewatch	·	1.4 km	MPC · JPL
319830	2006 VO_{123}	—	November 14, 2006	Kitt Peak	Spacewatch	(5)	1.2 km	MPC · JPL
319831	2006 VE_{127}	—	November 15, 2006	Kitt Peak	Spacewatch	·	3.8 km	MPC · JPL
319832	2006 VN_{132}	—	November 15, 2006	Kitt Peak	Spacewatch	·	1.5 km	MPC · JPL
319833	2006 VU_{134}	—	November 15, 2006	Socorro	LINEAR	slow	1.8 km	MPC · JPL
319834	2006 VD_{137}	—	November 15, 2006	Kitt Peak	Spacewatch	·	1.7 km	MPC · JPL
319835	2006 VO_{151}	—	November 9, 2006	Palomar	NEAT	·	1.4 km	MPC · JPL
319836	2006 VG_{155}	—	November 13, 2006	Catalina	CSS	·	3.1 km	MPC · JPL
319837	2006 VQ_{169}	—	November 13, 2006	Catalina	CSS	·	3.3 km	MPC · JPL
319838	2006 VX_{169}	—	November 11, 2006	Kitt Peak	Spacewatch	·	1.7 km	MPC · JPL
319839	2006 VB_{171}	—	November 11, 2006	Kitt Peak	Spacewatch	·	2.2 km	MPC · JPL
319840	2006 WJ	—	November 17, 2006	Catalina	CSS	BAR	1.7 km	MPC · JPL
319841	2006 WB_{2}	—	November 18, 2006	7300	W. K. Y. Yeung	·	1.4 km	MPC · JPL
319842	2006 WY_{4}	—	November 16, 2006	Kitt Peak	Spacewatch	·	1.3 km	MPC · JPL
319843	2006 WT_{11}	—	November 16, 2006	Kitt Peak	Spacewatch	·	1.9 km	MPC · JPL
319844	2006 WA_{12}	—	November 16, 2006	Mount Lemmon	Mount Lemmon Survey	·	1.5 km	MPC · JPL
319845	2006 WT_{16}	—	November 17, 2006	Kitt Peak	Spacewatch	MAR	1.3 km	MPC · JPL
319846	2006 WT_{17}	—	November 17, 2006	Mount Lemmon	Mount Lemmon Survey	·	1.3 km	MPC · JPL
319847	2006 WM_{18}	—	November 17, 2006	Mount Lemmon	Mount Lemmon Survey	·	1.4 km	MPC · JPL
319848	2006 WO_{19}	—	November 17, 2006	Mount Lemmon	Mount Lemmon Survey	·	1.2 km	MPC · JPL
319849	2006 WK_{22}	—	November 17, 2006	Kitt Peak	Spacewatch	·	3.6 km	MPC · JPL
319850	2006 WB_{23}	—	November 17, 2006	Mount Lemmon	Mount Lemmon Survey	·	2.5 km	MPC · JPL
319851	2006 WG_{31}	—	November 16, 2006	Kitt Peak	Spacewatch	·	1.6 km	MPC · JPL
319852	2006 WP_{32}	—	November 16, 2006	Kitt Peak	Spacewatch	·	1.9 km	MPC · JPL
319853	2006 WY_{33}	—	November 16, 2006	Kitt Peak	Spacewatch	·	1.6 km	MPC · JPL
319854	2006 WD_{34}	—	November 16, 2006	Kitt Peak	Spacewatch	·	2.0 km	MPC · JPL
319855	2006 WE_{39}	—	October 31, 2006	Mount Lemmon	Mount Lemmon Survey	MAS	760 m	MPC · JPL
319856	2006 WD_{46}	—	November 16, 2006	Mount Lemmon	Mount Lemmon Survey	·	1.3 km	MPC · JPL
319857	2006 WA_{47}	—	November 16, 2006	Kitt Peak	Spacewatch	·	1.4 km	MPC · JPL
319858	2006 WM_{48}	—	November 16, 2006	Kitt Peak	Spacewatch	·	1.6 km	MPC · JPL
319859	2006 WF_{49}	—	November 16, 2006	Mount Lemmon	Mount Lemmon Survey	·	740 m	MPC · JPL
319860	2006 WH_{53}	—	November 16, 2006	Catalina	CSS	·	2.6 km	MPC · JPL
319861	2006 WJ_{54}	—	November 16, 2006	Kitt Peak	Spacewatch	·	2.0 km	MPC · JPL
319862	2006 WS_{54}	—	November 16, 2006	Kitt Peak	Spacewatch	·	2.2 km	MPC · JPL
319863	2006 WJ_{56}	—	November 16, 2006	Kitt Peak	Spacewatch	·	1.0 km	MPC · JPL
319864	2006 WA_{62}	—	November 17, 2006	Catalina	CSS	·	2.7 km	MPC · JPL
319865	2006 WC_{67}	—	November 17, 2006	Mount Lemmon	Mount Lemmon Survey	·	1.6 km	MPC · JPL
319866	2006 WY_{70}	—	November 18, 2006	Kitt Peak	Spacewatch	·	1.5 km	MPC · JPL
319867	2006 WE_{73}	—	November 18, 2006	Kitt Peak	Spacewatch	·	1.3 km	MPC · JPL
319868	2006 WT_{73}	—	November 18, 2006	Kitt Peak	Spacewatch	NYS	1.4 km	MPC · JPL
319869	2006 WS_{74}	—	February 3, 2000	Kitt Peak	Spacewatch	·	1.2 km	MPC · JPL
319870	2006 WH_{77}	—	November 18, 2006	Kitt Peak	Spacewatch	·	1.5 km	MPC · JPL
319871	2006 WZ_{89}	—	November 18, 2006	Kitt Peak	Spacewatch	·	1.4 km	MPC · JPL
319872	2006 WW_{91}	—	November 19, 2006	Kitt Peak	Spacewatch	NYS	1.5 km	MPC · JPL
319873	2006 WC_{101}	—	November 19, 2006	Socorro	LINEAR	·	1.3 km	MPC · JPL
319874	2006 WF_{102}	—	November 19, 2006	Catalina	CSS	·	930 m	MPC · JPL
319875	2006 WE_{106}	—	November 19, 2006	Kitt Peak	Spacewatch	·	1.1 km	MPC · JPL
319876	2006 WA_{108}	—	November 19, 2006	Catalina	CSS	EOS	2.5 km	MPC · JPL
319877	2006 WD_{109}	—	November 19, 2006	Kitt Peak	Spacewatch	·	1.8 km	MPC · JPL
319878	2006 WN_{111}	—	November 19, 2006	Kitt Peak	Spacewatch	·	1.1 km	MPC · JPL
319879	2006 WW_{111}	—	November 19, 2006	Catalina	CSS	·	2.2 km	MPC · JPL
319880	2006 WV_{112}	—	November 19, 2006	Kitt Peak	Spacewatch	·	1.8 km	MPC · JPL
319881	2006 WQ_{115}	—	November 20, 2006	Catalina	CSS	·	2.1 km	MPC · JPL
319882	2006 WB_{123}	—	November 21, 2006	Mount Lemmon	Mount Lemmon Survey	·	700 m	MPC · JPL
319883	2006 WC_{124}	—	November 22, 2006	Kitt Peak	Spacewatch	·	1.3 km	MPC · JPL
319884	2006 WQ_{126}	—	November 22, 2006	Catalina	CSS	·	2.3 km	MPC · JPL
319885	2006 WH_{129}	—	November 26, 2006	7300	W. K. Y. Yeung	·	650 m	MPC · JPL
319886	2006 WX_{132}	—	November 18, 2006	Kitt Peak	Spacewatch	·	1.4 km	MPC · JPL
319887	2006 WO_{148}	—	November 20, 2006	Kitt Peak	Spacewatch	KOR	1.6 km	MPC · JPL
319888	2006 WX_{156}	—	October 20, 2006	Mount Lemmon	Mount Lemmon Survey	·	1.6 km	MPC · JPL
319889	2006 WE_{157}	—	November 22, 2006	Catalina	CSS	·	2.5 km	MPC · JPL
319890	2006 WN_{157}	—	November 22, 2006	Catalina	CSS	·	1.5 km	MPC · JPL
319891	2006 WH_{164}	—	November 23, 2006	Kitt Peak	Spacewatch	·	1.7 km	MPC · JPL
319892	2006 WK_{174}	—	November 23, 2006	Kitt Peak	Spacewatch	·	1.4 km	MPC · JPL
319893	2006 WB_{176}	—	November 23, 2006	Kitt Peak	Spacewatch	KOR	1.4 km	MPC · JPL
319894	2006 WG_{185}	—	November 23, 2006	Catalina	CSS	·	2.4 km	MPC · JPL
319895	2006 WJ_{187}	—	March 27, 2004	Kitt Peak	Spacewatch	EOS	2.5 km	MPC · JPL
319896	2006 WY_{188}	—	November 24, 2006	Mount Lemmon	Mount Lemmon Survey	WIT	1.2 km	MPC · JPL
319897	2006 WZ_{192}	—	November 27, 2006	Kitt Peak	Spacewatch	(11882)	2.0 km	MPC · JPL
319898	2006 WL_{193}	—	November 27, 2006	Kitt Peak	Spacewatch	·	1.3 km	MPC · JPL
319899	2006 WR_{201}	—	November 22, 2006	Mount Lemmon	Mount Lemmon Survey	·	1.2 km	MPC · JPL
319900	2006 WB_{202}	—	November 23, 2006	Mount Lemmon	Mount Lemmon Survey	EUN	1.7 km	MPC · JPL

== 319901–320000 ==
back to top

Designation			Discovery			Properties		Ref
Permanent	Provisional	Named after	Date	Site	Discoverer(s)	Category	Diam.	Ref
319901	2006 WW_{203}	—	November 27, 2006	Mount Lemmon	Mount Lemmon Survey	NEM	2.5 km	MPC · JPL
319902	2006 WE_{204}	—	November 21, 2006	Mount Lemmon	Mount Lemmon Survey	·	2.0 km	MPC · JPL
319903	2006 WK_{205}	—	November 20, 2006	Kitt Peak	Spacewatch	WIT	1.2 km	MPC · JPL
319904	2006 XC_{4}	—	December 14, 2006	Kitami	K. Endate	(1547)	1.5 km	MPC · JPL
319905	2006 XR_{6}	—	December 9, 2006	Palomar	NEAT	·	2.7 km	MPC · JPL
319906	2006 XN_{8}	—	December 9, 2006	Palomar	NEAT	·	2.5 km	MPC · JPL
319907	2006 XP_{15}	—	December 10, 2006	7300	W. K. Y. Yeung	·	1.6 km	MPC · JPL
319908	2006 XC_{23}	—	December 12, 2006	Kitt Peak	Spacewatch	·	1.9 km	MPC · JPL
319909	2006 XE_{31}	—	December 15, 2006	Bisei SG Center	BATTeRS	·	3.3 km	MPC · JPL
319910	2006 XM_{31}	—	December 15, 2006	Bergisch Gladbach	W. Bickel	·	1.9 km	MPC · JPL
319911	2006 XG_{34}	—	December 11, 2006	Kitt Peak	Spacewatch	·	2.5 km	MPC · JPL
319912	2006 XD_{38}	—	December 11, 2006	Kitt Peak	Spacewatch	·	1.7 km	MPC · JPL
319913	2006 XL_{38}	—	October 23, 2006	Mount Lemmon	Mount Lemmon Survey	·	1.9 km	MPC · JPL
319914	2006 XN_{46}	—	December 13, 2006	Socorro	LINEAR	·	2.5 km	MPC · JPL
319915	2006 XF_{49}	—	December 13, 2006	Mount Lemmon	Mount Lemmon Survey	·	1.9 km	MPC · JPL
319916	2006 XC_{58}	—	December 14, 2006	Kitt Peak	Spacewatch	·	1.7 km	MPC · JPL
319917	2006 XZ_{64}	—	December 12, 2006	Palomar	NEAT	·	2.3 km	MPC · JPL
319918	2006 XL_{69}	—	December 13, 2006	Kitt Peak	Spacewatch	·	3.4 km	MPC · JPL
319919	2006 XP_{69}	—	December 15, 2006	Kitt Peak	Spacewatch	·	1.8 km	MPC · JPL
319920	2006 XS_{71}	—	December 1, 2006	Kitt Peak	Spacewatch	·	1.8 km	MPC · JPL
319921	2006 XO_{73}	—	September 23, 2005	Kitt Peak	Spacewatch	·	2.2 km	MPC · JPL
319922	2006 YV_{11}	—	December 18, 2006	Mount Nyukasa	Japan Aerospace Exploration Agency	GEF	1.6 km	MPC · JPL
319923	2006 YE_{17}	—	December 21, 2006	Mount Lemmon	Mount Lemmon Survey	·	1.1 km	MPC · JPL
319924	2006 YR_{17}	—	December 21, 2006	Mount Lemmon	Mount Lemmon Survey	·	3.3 km	MPC · JPL
319925	2006 YZ_{19}	—	December 27, 2006	Piszkéstető	K. Sárneczky	·	2.5 km	MPC · JPL
319926	2006 YH_{20}	—	December 21, 2006	Kitt Peak	Spacewatch	(5)	1.6 km	MPC · JPL
319927	2006 YX_{22}	—	August 31, 2005	Kitt Peak	Spacewatch	PAD	1.5 km	MPC · JPL
319928	2006 YB_{26}	—	December 21, 2006	Kitt Peak	Spacewatch	·	2.5 km	MPC · JPL
319929	2006 YF_{26}	—	December 21, 2006	Kitt Peak	Spacewatch	·	1.8 km	MPC · JPL
319930	2006 YH_{35}	—	December 21, 2006	Kitt Peak	Spacewatch	·	2.0 km	MPC · JPL
319931	2006 YD_{38}	—	December 21, 2006	Kitt Peak	Spacewatch	·	1.8 km	MPC · JPL
319932	2006 YL_{41}	—	December 22, 2006	Socorro	LINEAR	·	2.4 km	MPC · JPL
319933	2006 YQ_{42}	—	December 23, 2006	Catalina	CSS	·	1.6 km	MPC · JPL
319934	2006 YS_{45}	—	December 21, 2006	Mount Lemmon	Mount Lemmon Survey	·	1.5 km	MPC · JPL
319935	2006 YS_{48}	—	December 24, 2006	Kitt Peak	Spacewatch	·	1.6 km	MPC · JPL
319936	2006 YE_{50}	—	December 21, 2006	Kitt Peak	M. W. Buie	·	2.0 km	MPC · JPL
319937	2006 YB_{53}	—	December 20, 2006	Mount Lemmon	Mount Lemmon Survey	EOS	2.0 km	MPC · JPL
319938	2006 YD_{53}	—	December 21, 2006	Catalina	CSS	·	4.1 km	MPC · JPL
319939	2007 AR_{2}	—	January 8, 2007	Mount Lemmon	Mount Lemmon Survey	·	2.2 km	MPC · JPL
319940	2007 AQ_{15}	—	January 10, 2007	Mount Lemmon	Mount Lemmon Survey	·	2.3 km	MPC · JPL
319941	2007 BP_{8}	—	January 16, 2007	Catalina	CSS	·	3.4 km	MPC · JPL
319942	2007 BM_{9}	—	January 17, 2007	Palomar	NEAT	AEO	1.5 km	MPC · JPL
319943	2007 BE_{11}	—	January 17, 2007	Kitt Peak	Spacewatch	·	1.9 km	MPC · JPL
319944	2007 BR_{16}	—	January 17, 2007	Palomar	NEAT	·	2.4 km	MPC · JPL
319945	2007 BE_{17}	—	January 17, 2007	Kitt Peak	Spacewatch	BRA	1.6 km	MPC · JPL
319946	2007 BG_{20}	—	January 23, 2007	Socorro	LINEAR	·	2.6 km	MPC · JPL
319947	2007 BU_{26}	—	August 26, 2005	Palomar	NEAT	·	2.2 km	MPC · JPL
319948	2007 BZ_{27}	—	January 24, 2007	Mount Lemmon	Mount Lemmon Survey	(16286)	2.1 km	MPC · JPL
319949	2007 BC_{28}	—	January 24, 2007	Mount Lemmon	Mount Lemmon Survey	·	2.0 km	MPC · JPL
319950	2007 BJ_{32}	—	January 24, 2007	Mount Lemmon	Mount Lemmon Survey	·	820 m	MPC · JPL
319951	2007 BE_{34}	—	January 24, 2007	Mount Lemmon	Mount Lemmon Survey	·	1.9 km	MPC · JPL
319952	2007 BN_{36}	—	November 2, 2005	Mount Lemmon	Mount Lemmon Survey	HYG	3.3 km	MPC · JPL
319953	2007 BY_{37}	—	January 24, 2007	Mount Lemmon	Mount Lemmon Survey	·	630 m	MPC · JPL
319954	2007 BW_{39}	—	January 24, 2007	Mount Lemmon	Mount Lemmon Survey	NEM	2.3 km	MPC · JPL
319955	2007 BG_{47}	—	January 26, 2007	Kitt Peak	Spacewatch	·	2.6 km	MPC · JPL
319956	2007 BM_{57}	—	January 24, 2007	Catalina	CSS	·	2.6 km	MPC · JPL
319957	2007 BL_{64}	—	January 27, 2007	Mount Lemmon	Mount Lemmon Survey	·	1.9 km	MPC · JPL
319958	2007 BD_{65}	—	January 27, 2007	Mount Lemmon	Mount Lemmon Survey	·	2.1 km	MPC · JPL
319959	2007 BO_{70}	—	January 27, 2007	Mount Lemmon	Mount Lemmon Survey	·	3.3 km	MPC · JPL
319960	2007 BB_{74}	—	January 27, 2007	Mount Lemmon	Mount Lemmon Survey	·	2.2 km	MPC · JPL
319961	2007 BX_{74}	—	January 27, 2007	Kitt Peak	Spacewatch	·	3.3 km	MPC · JPL
319962	2007 BP_{75}	—	January 17, 2007	Kitt Peak	Spacewatch	·	1.8 km	MPC · JPL
319963	2007 BT_{76}	—	August 27, 2005	Palomar	NEAT	·	1.7 km	MPC · JPL
319964	2007 BH_{78}	—	January 24, 2007	Catalina	CSS	·	2.3 km	MPC · JPL
319965	2007 BC_{99}	—	October 12, 2005	Kitt Peak	Spacewatch	KOR	1.3 km	MPC · JPL
319966	2007 BT_{99}	—	January 16, 2007	Catalina	CSS	·	2.8 km	MPC · JPL
319967	2007 BP_{100}	—	January 24, 2007	Mount Lemmon	Mount Lemmon Survey	·	1.8 km	MPC · JPL
319968	2007 BC_{102}	—	January 17, 2007	Catalina	CSS	·	3.5 km	MPC · JPL
319969	2007 CX_{2}	—	February 6, 2007	Kitt Peak	Spacewatch	·	1.7 km	MPC · JPL
319970	2007 CK_{3}	—	February 6, 2007	Kitt Peak	Spacewatch	HOF	3.4 km	MPC · JPL
319971	2007 CU_{6}	—	December 24, 2006	Kitt Peak	Spacewatch	AGN	1.2 km	MPC · JPL
319972	2007 CC_{9}	—	February 6, 2007	Kitt Peak	Spacewatch	·	2.6 km	MPC · JPL
319973	2007 CQ_{15}	—	February 6, 2007	Mount Lemmon	Mount Lemmon Survey	(5)	1.5 km	MPC · JPL
319974	2007 CB_{17}	—	February 8, 2007	Kitt Peak	Spacewatch	·	650 m	MPC · JPL
319975	2007 CB_{18}	—	February 8, 2007	Mount Lemmon	Mount Lemmon Survey	KOR	1.5 km	MPC · JPL
319976	2007 CA_{28}	—	February 6, 2007	Kitt Peak	Spacewatch	·	2.6 km	MPC · JPL
319977	2007 CP_{28}	—	February 6, 2007	Mount Lemmon	Mount Lemmon Survey	·	2.0 km	MPC · JPL
319978	2007 CH_{29}	—	February 6, 2007	Mount Lemmon	Mount Lemmon Survey	·	680 m	MPC · JPL
319979	2007 CV_{30}	—	February 6, 2007	Mount Lemmon	Mount Lemmon Survey	·	2.0 km	MPC · JPL
319980	2007 CX_{30}	—	February 6, 2007	Mount Lemmon	Mount Lemmon Survey	·	1.7 km	MPC · JPL
319981	2007 CW_{39}	—	February 6, 2007	Mount Lemmon	Mount Lemmon Survey	·	1.9 km	MPC · JPL
319982	2007 CN_{50}	—	February 8, 2007	Palomar	NEAT	·	3.3 km	MPC · JPL
319983	2007 CL_{54}	—	February 6, 2007	Kitt Peak	Spacewatch	·	4.4 km	MPC · JPL
319984	2007 CB_{59}	—	February 10, 2007	Catalina	CSS	·	2.0 km	MPC · JPL
319985	2007 CU_{60}	—	February 10, 2007	Catalina	CSS	H	590 m	MPC · JPL
319986	2007 CW_{62}	—	February 15, 2007	Catalina	CSS	·	2.3 km	MPC · JPL
319987	2007 CY_{79}	—	February 9, 2007	Kitt Peak	Spacewatch	·	2.4 km	MPC · JPL
319988	2007 DK	—	February 17, 2007	Catalina	CSS	APO	450 m	MPC · JPL
319989	2007 DW_{1}	—	October 22, 2006	Mount Lemmon	Mount Lemmon Survey	·	4.4 km	MPC · JPL
319990	2007 DO_{2}	—	February 16, 2007	Catalina	CSS	(22805)	3.4 km	MPC · JPL
319991	2007 DY_{7}	—	February 17, 2007	Kitt Peak	Spacewatch	H	550 m	MPC · JPL
319992	2007 DY_{9}	—	February 17, 2007	Kitt Peak	Spacewatch	·	2.1 km	MPC · JPL
319993	2007 DD_{17}	—	February 17, 2007	Kitt Peak	Spacewatch	·	2.1 km	MPC · JPL
319994	2007 DO_{21}	—	February 17, 2007	Kitt Peak	Spacewatch	KOR	1.6 km	MPC · JPL
319995	2007 DS_{21}	—	February 17, 2007	Kitt Peak	Spacewatch	TEL	1.7 km	MPC · JPL
319996	2007 DP_{24}	—	February 17, 2007	Kitt Peak	Spacewatch	·	2.3 km	MPC · JPL
319997	2007 DE_{27}	—	February 17, 2007	Kitt Peak	Spacewatch	·	3.1 km	MPC · JPL
319998	2007 DH_{27}	—	February 17, 2007	Kitt Peak	Spacewatch	KOR	1.7 km	MPC · JPL
319999	2007 DM_{27}	—	February 17, 2007	Kitt Peak	Spacewatch	·	1.4 km	MPC · JPL
320000	2007 DQ_{27}	—	February 17, 2007	Kitt Peak	Spacewatch	HOF	3.2 km	MPC · JPL

back to top

== See also ==
- Meanings of minor-planet names: 319001–320000
