= Meanings of minor-planet names: 319001–320000 =

As minor planet discoveries are confirmed, they are given a permanent number by the IAU's Minor Planet Center (MPC), and the discoverers can then submit names for them, following the IAU's naming conventions. The list below concerns those minor planets in the specified number-range that have received names, and explains the meanings of those names.

Official naming citations of newly named small Solar System bodies are approved and published in a bulletin by IAU's Working Group for Small Bodies Nomenclature (WGSBN). Before May 2021, citations were published in MPC's Minor Planet Circulars for many decades. Recent citations can also be found on the JPL Small-Body Database (SBDB). Until his death in 2016, German astronomer Lutz D. Schmadel compiled these citations into the Dictionary of Minor Planet Names (DMP) and regularly updated the collection.

Based on Paul Herget's The Names of the Minor Planets, Schmadel also researched the unclear origin of numerous asteroids, most of which had been named prior to World War II. This article incorporates text from this source, which is in the public domain: SBDB New namings may only be added to this list below after official publication as the preannouncement of names is condemned. The WGSBN publishes a comprehensive guideline for the naming rules of non-cometary small Solar System bodies.

== 319001–319100 ==
Named minor planet	Provisional	This minor planet was named for...	Ref · Catalog
319009 Kudirka	2005 UP_{488}	Vincas Kudirka (1858–1899) trained as a physician but is best known as a Lithuanian poet. He is regarded in Lithuania as a National Hero and he wrote both the music and lyrics of the Lithuanian National Anthem, Tautiška giesmė.	IAU · 319009
319090 Barbarahillary	2005 WQ_{140}	Barbara Hillary (1931–2019), American explorer, inspirational speaker, publisher and community activist.	IAU · 319090

== 319101–319200 ==
back to top

Named minor planet	Provisional	This minor planet was named for...	Ref · Catalog
There are no named minor planets in this number range

== 319201–319300 ==
back to top

Named minor planet	Provisional	This minor planet was named for...	Ref · Catalog
319227 Erichbär	2006 AJ_{8}	Erich Bär (1905–1981), a German electrical engineer and amateur astronomer.	JPL · 319227

== 319301–319400 ==
back to top

Named minor planet	Provisional	This minor planet was named for...	Ref · Catalog
There are no named minor planets in this number range

== 319401–319500 ==
back to top

Named minor planet	Provisional	This minor planet was named for...	Ref · Catalog
There are no named minor planets in this number range

== 319501–319600 ==
back to top

Named minor planet	Provisional	This minor planet was named for...	Ref · Catalog
There are no named minor planets in this number range

== 319601–319700 ==
back to top

Named minor planet	Provisional	This minor planet was named for...	Ref · Catalog
319601 Šilutė	2006 SP_{197}	Silute, a city in the south of the Klaipeda County in western Lithuania.	IAU · 319601
319636 Dziewulski	2006 SE_{368}	Władysław Dziewulski (1878–1962), a Polish astronomer and mathematician.	IAU · 319636
319651 Topografo	2006 TO_{7}	The names is dedicated to the Italian Society of Photogrammetry and Topography and to all Italians involved in surveying sciences	IAU · 319651

== 319701–319800 ==
back to top

Named minor planet	Provisional	This minor planet was named for...	Ref · Catalog
There are no named minor planets in this number range

== 319801–319900 ==
back to top

Named minor planet	Provisional	This minor planet was named for...	Ref · Catalog
There are no named minor planets in this number range

== 319901–320000 ==
back to top

Named minor planet	Provisional	This minor planet was named for...	Ref · Catalog
There are no named minor planets in this number range

back to top

Preceded by 318,001–319,000	Meanings of minor-planet names List of minor planets: 319,001–320,000	Succeeded by 320,001–321,000
