= List of minor planets: 318001–319000 =

The following is a partial list of minor planets, running from minor-planet number 318001 through 319000, inclusive. The primary data for this and other partial lists is based on JPL's "Small-Body Orbital Elements" and data available from the Minor Planet Center. Critical list information is also provided by the MPC, unless otherwise specified from Lowell Observatory. A detailed description of the table's columns and additional sources are given on the main page including a complete list of every page in this series, and a statistical break-up on the dynamical classification of minor planets.

Also see the summary list of all named bodies in numerical and alphabetical order, and the corresponding naming citations for the number range of this particular list. New namings may only be added to this list after official publication, as the preannouncement of names is condemned by the Working Group for Small Bodies Nomenclature of the International Astronomical Union.

Near-Earth obj.	MBA (inner)	MBA (outer)	Centaur
Mars-crosser	MBA (middle)	Jupiter trojan	Trans-Neptunian obj.
Unclassified

== 318001–318100 ==
Designation			Discovery			Properties		Ref
Permanent	Provisional	Named after	Date	Site	Discoverer(s)	Category	Diam.	Ref
318001	2004 CP_{24}	—	February 12, 2004	Palomar	NEAT	H	690 m	MPC · JPL
318002	2004 CZ_{41}	—	February 9, 2004	Palomar	NEAT	·	1.3 km	MPC · JPL
318003	2004 CM_{49}	—	February 14, 2004	Kitt Peak	Spacewatch	H	630 m	MPC · JPL
318004	2004 CQ_{54}	—	February 11, 2004	Palomar	NEAT	·	1.8 km	MPC · JPL
318005	2004 CV_{58}	—	February 10, 2004	Palomar	NEAT	·	3.9 km	MPC · JPL
318006	2004 CV_{60}	—	February 11, 2004	Palomar	NEAT	PHO	1.5 km	MPC · JPL
318007	2004 CG_{75}	—	February 11, 2004	Palomar	NEAT	NYS	1.2 km	MPC · JPL
318008	2004 CN_{83}	—	February 12, 2004	Kitt Peak	Spacewatch	3:2	6.0 km	MPC · JPL
318009	2004 CD_{92}	—	February 14, 2004	Palomar	NEAT	HIL · 3:2 · (6124)	7.8 km	MPC · JPL
318010	2004 CJ_{93}	—	February 15, 2004	Socorro	LINEAR	H	690 m	MPC · JPL
318011	2004 CV_{99}	—	February 15, 2004	Catalina	CSS	3:2	6.1 km	MPC · JPL
318012	2004 CN_{110}	—	February 11, 2004	Anderson Mesa	LONEOS	H	730 m	MPC · JPL
318013	2004 CY_{118}	—	February 11, 2004	Kitt Peak	Spacewatch	·	1.1 km	MPC · JPL
318014	2004 DE_{2}	—	February 19, 2004	Haleakala	NEAT	HIL · 3:2	8.3 km	MPC · JPL
318015	2004 DG_{4}	—	February 16, 2004	Socorro	LINEAR	H · slow	850 m	MPC · JPL
318016	2004 DZ_{22}	—	February 18, 2004	Catalina	CSS	EUN	1.4 km	MPC · JPL
318017	2004 DH_{27}	—	February 16, 2004	Kitt Peak	Spacewatch	·	1.6 km	MPC · JPL
318018	2004 DB_{34}	—	February 18, 2004	Catalina	CSS	EUN	1.5 km	MPC · JPL
318019	2004 DZ_{40}	—	February 18, 2004	Socorro	LINEAR	H	640 m	MPC · JPL
318020	2004 DD_{44}	—	February 16, 2004	Socorro	LINEAR	·	1.1 km	MPC · JPL
318021	2004 DM_{63}	—	February 29, 2004	Kitt Peak	Spacewatch	CLA	1.8 km	MPC · JPL
318022	2004 DE_{68}	—	February 26, 2004	Kitt Peak	M. W. Buie	MAR	1.3 km	MPC · JPL
318023	2004 ET_{1}	—	March 11, 2004	Palomar	NEAT	·	1.8 km	MPC · JPL
318024	2004 EE_{6}	—	March 12, 2004	Palomar	NEAT	VER	3.7 km	MPC · JPL
318025	2004 EO_{6}	—	March 12, 2004	Palomar	NEAT	MAR	1.8 km	MPC · JPL
318026	2004 ES_{13}	—	March 11, 2004	Palomar	NEAT	·	1.5 km	MPC · JPL
318027	2004 EW_{15}	—	March 12, 2004	Palomar	NEAT	JUN	980 m	MPC · JPL
318028	2004 EB_{16}	—	March 12, 2004	Palomar	NEAT	·	1.3 km	MPC · JPL
318029	2004 EN_{23}	—	March 14, 2004	Palomar	NEAT	H	940 m	MPC · JPL
318030	2004 EV_{27}	—	March 15, 2004	Kitt Peak	Spacewatch	RAF	900 m	MPC · JPL
318031	2004 ES_{37}	—	March 14, 2004	Palomar	NEAT	·	3.2 km	MPC · JPL
318032	2004 EX_{37}	—	March 14, 2004	Kitt Peak	Spacewatch	·	1.6 km	MPC · JPL
318033	2004 EN_{48}	—	March 15, 2004	Socorro	LINEAR	·	1.2 km	MPC · JPL
318034	2004 EW_{50}	—	March 14, 2004	Kitt Peak	Spacewatch	·	2.0 km	MPC · JPL
318035	2004 EC_{53}	—	March 15, 2004	Socorro	LINEAR	·	1.4 km	MPC · JPL
318036	2004 EU_{53}	—	March 15, 2004	Socorro	LINEAR	DOR	3.2 km	MPC · JPL
318037	2004 EY_{62}	—	March 13, 2004	Palomar	NEAT	·	1.7 km	MPC · JPL
318038	2004 ED_{65}	—	March 14, 2004	Socorro	LINEAR	·	2.9 km	MPC · JPL
318039	2004 EK_{78}	—	March 15, 2004	Catalina	CSS	·	930 m	MPC · JPL
318040	2004 ED_{91}	—	March 15, 2004	Kitt Peak	Spacewatch	·	1.5 km	MPC · JPL
318041	2004 EN_{91}	—	March 15, 2004	Kitt Peak	Spacewatch	·	940 m	MPC · JPL
318042	2004 EF_{93}	—	March 14, 2004	Kitt Peak	Spacewatch	EOS	2.2 km	MPC · JPL
318043	2004 FG_{10}	—	March 16, 2004	Campo Imperatore	CINEOS	·	1.8 km	MPC · JPL
318044	2004 FQ_{17}	—	March 26, 2004	Socorro	LINEAR	·	2.3 km	MPC · JPL
318045	2004 FU_{17}	—	March 27, 2004	Socorro	LINEAR	H	810 m	MPC · JPL
318046	2004 FT_{23}	—	March 17, 2004	Kitt Peak	Spacewatch	·	1.5 km	MPC · JPL
318047	2004 FB_{26}	—	March 17, 2004	Socorro	LINEAR	EUN	1.4 km	MPC · JPL
318048	2004 FM_{30}	—	March 29, 2004	Socorro	LINEAR	H	900 m	MPC · JPL
318049	2004 FB_{31}	—	March 29, 2004	Socorro	LINEAR	·	1.6 km	MPC · JPL
318050	2004 FC_{32}	—	March 30, 2004	Socorro	LINEAR	AMO	600 m	MPC · JPL
318051	2004 FY_{50}	—	March 18, 2004	Kitt Peak	Spacewatch	·	1.4 km	MPC · JPL
318052	2004 FC_{52}	—	March 19, 2004	Socorro	LINEAR	·	920 m	MPC · JPL
318053	2004 FR_{52}	—	March 19, 2004	Socorro	LINEAR	·	2.2 km	MPC · JPL
318054	2004 FA_{55}	—	March 18, 2004	Kitt Peak	Spacewatch	(5)	1.1 km	MPC · JPL
318055	2004 FV_{60}	—	March 18, 2004	Kitt Peak	Spacewatch	·	2.0 km	MPC · JPL
318056	2004 FQ_{67}	—	March 20, 2004	Socorro	LINEAR	·	2.4 km	MPC · JPL
318057	2004 FF_{83}	—	March 17, 2004	Siding Spring	SSS	·	1.6 km	MPC · JPL
318058	2004 FE_{84}	—	March 18, 2004	Kitt Peak	Spacewatch	·	4.3 km	MPC · JPL
318059	2004 FY_{88}	—	March 20, 2004	Kitt Peak	Spacewatch	·	1.4 km	MPC · JPL
318060	2004 FT_{90}	—	March 20, 2004	Siding Spring	SSS	H	940 m	MPC · JPL
318061	2004 FR_{91}	—	March 22, 2004	Socorro	LINEAR	·	1.3 km	MPC · JPL
318062	2004 FX_{91}	—	March 22, 2004	Socorro	LINEAR	·	1.9 km	MPC · JPL
318063	2004 FM_{122}	—	March 26, 2004	Socorro	LINEAR	·	1.6 km	MPC · JPL
318064	2004 FS_{127}	—	March 27, 2004	Socorro	LINEAR	(5)	1.1 km	MPC · JPL
318065	2004 FQ_{128}	—	March 27, 2004	Kitt Peak	Spacewatch	·	1.7 km	MPC · JPL
318066	2004 FX_{136}	—	March 28, 2004	Socorro	LINEAR	·	2.1 km	MPC · JPL
318067	2004 FS_{140}	—	March 27, 2004	Socorro	LINEAR	·	690 m	MPC · JPL
318068	2004 FS_{143}	—	March 28, 2004	Socorro	LINEAR	·	2.2 km	MPC · JPL
318069	2004 FW_{147}	—	March 16, 2004	Socorro	LINEAR	EUN	1.9 km	MPC · JPL
318070	2004 FW_{148}	—	March 16, 2004	Kitt Peak	Spacewatch	·	1.7 km	MPC · JPL
318071	2004 FZ_{152}	—	March 17, 2004	Kitt Peak	Spacewatch	·	1.5 km	MPC · JPL
318072	2004 FE_{161}	—	March 18, 2004	Socorro	LINEAR	·	1.6 km	MPC · JPL
318073	2004 GN_{1}	—	April 10, 2004	Palomar	NEAT	JUN	1.4 km	MPC · JPL
318074	2004 GP_{1}	—	April 10, 2004	Palomar	NEAT	EUN	1.5 km	MPC · JPL
318075	2004 GW_{8}	—	April 12, 2004	Kitt Peak	Spacewatch	·	1.1 km	MPC · JPL
318076	2004 GL_{11}	—	April 13, 2004	Catalina	CSS	·	1.6 km	MPC · JPL
318077	2004 GK_{12}	—	April 9, 2004	Siding Spring	SSS	H	760 m	MPC · JPL
318078	2004 GA_{14}	—	April 13, 2004	Catalina	CSS	H	740 m	MPC · JPL
318079	2004 GM_{14}	—	April 13, 2004	Kitt Peak	Spacewatch	·	1.5 km	MPC · JPL
318080	2004 GD_{19}	—	April 12, 2004	Palomar	NEAT	·	1.9 km	MPC · JPL
318081	2004 GG_{20}	—	April 15, 2004	Siding Spring	SSS	T_{j} (2.94)	6.6 km	MPC · JPL
318082	2004 GP_{20}	—	April 9, 2004	Siding Spring	SSS	MAR	1.4 km	MPC · JPL
318083	2004 GE_{21}	—	April 11, 2004	Palomar	NEAT	·	2.1 km	MPC · JPL
318084	2004 GP_{27}	—	April 15, 2004	Palomar	NEAT	·	1.2 km	MPC · JPL
318085	2004 GO_{42}	—	April 14, 2004	Anderson Mesa	LONEOS	·	1.4 km	MPC · JPL
318086	2004 GQ_{48}	—	April 12, 2004	Kitt Peak	Spacewatch	·	680 m	MPC · JPL
318087	2004 GW_{48}	—	April 12, 2004	Kitt Peak	Spacewatch	·	1.3 km	MPC · JPL
318088	2004 GL_{60}	—	April 14, 2004	Kitt Peak	Spacewatch	·	1.5 km	MPC · JPL
318089	2004 GX_{66}	—	April 13, 2004	Kitt Peak	Spacewatch	MAS	1.0 km	MPC · JPL
318090	2004 GZ_{70}	—	April 13, 2004	Palomar	NEAT	·	3.0 km	MPC · JPL
318091	2004 GD_{72}	—	April 14, 2004	Kitt Peak	Spacewatch	·	1.5 km	MPC · JPL
318092	2004 GA_{75}	—	April 15, 2004	Socorro	LINEAR	JUN	1.4 km	MPC · JPL
318093	2004 GJ_{76}	—	April 15, 2004	Kitt Peak	Spacewatch	·	1.2 km	MPC · JPL
318094	2004 GP_{77}	—	April 14, 2004	Catalina	CSS	·	2.1 km	MPC · JPL
318095	2004 GW_{77}	—	April 15, 2004	Socorro	LINEAR	PHO	3.0 km	MPC · JPL
318096	2004 GY_{88}	—	April 13, 2004	Apache Point	SDSS	HNS	1.6 km	MPC · JPL
318097	2004 HA_{12}	—	April 19, 2004	Socorro	LINEAR	EUN	1.4 km	MPC · JPL
318098	2004 HJ_{20}	—	April 19, 2004	Goodricke-Pigott	Goodricke-Pigott	·	1.3 km	MPC · JPL
318099	2004 HZ_{28}	—	April 20, 2004	Socorro	LINEAR	EUN	1.9 km	MPC · JPL
318100	2004 HU_{33}	—	April 16, 2004	Socorro	LINEAR	·	2.2 km	MPC · JPL

== 318101–318200 ==
back to top

Designation			Discovery			Properties		Ref
Permanent	Provisional	Named after	Date	Site	Discoverer(s)	Category	Diam.	Ref
318101	2004 HY_{40}	—	April 19, 2004	Kitt Peak	Spacewatch	L4	12 km	MPC · JPL
318102	2004 HM_{43}	—	April 20, 2004	Siding Spring	SSS	·	1.7 km	MPC · JPL
318103	2004 HP_{45}	—	April 21, 2004	Socorro	LINEAR	·	1.1 km	MPC · JPL
318104	2004 HT_{45}	—	April 21, 2004	Socorro	LINEAR	RAF	1.5 km	MPC · JPL
318105	2004 HR_{50}	—	April 23, 2004	Kitt Peak	Spacewatch	·	1.8 km	MPC · JPL
318106	2004 HM_{54}	—	April 21, 2004	Kitt Peak	Spacewatch	·	4.5 km	MPC · JPL
318107	2004 HN_{74}	—	January 15, 1997	Campo Imperatore	CINEOS	·	790 m	MPC · JPL
318108	2004 HC_{75}	—	April 30, 2004	Siding Spring	SSS	·	1.8 km	MPC · JPL
318109	2004 JG_{2}	—	May 11, 2004	Goodricke-Pigott	R. A. Tucker	·	2.0 km	MPC · JPL
318110	2004 JK_{2}	—	May 12, 2004	Desert Eagle	W. K. Y. Yeung	·	1.2 km	MPC · JPL
318111	2004 JK_{12}	—	May 13, 2004	Socorro	LINEAR	·	2.3 km	MPC · JPL
318112	2004 JU_{12}	—	May 13, 2004	Reedy Creek	J. Broughton	·	2.8 km	MPC · JPL
318113	2004 JJ_{13}	—	May 13, 2004	Socorro	LINEAR	·	3.3 km	MPC · JPL
318114	2004 JE_{18}	—	May 13, 2004	Anderson Mesa	LONEOS	·	1.5 km	MPC · JPL
318115	2004 JD_{25}	—	May 15, 2004	Socorro	LINEAR	(5)	1.6 km	MPC · JPL
318116	2004 JY_{29}	—	May 15, 2004	Socorro	LINEAR	·	2.0 km	MPC · JPL
318117	2004 JH_{31}	—	May 15, 2004	Socorro	LINEAR	·	2.3 km	MPC · JPL
318118	2004 KL_{12}	—	May 22, 2004	Catalina	CSS	·	1.8 km	MPC · JPL
318119	2004 KC_{13}	—	May 23, 2004	Socorro	LINEAR	H	740 m	MPC · JPL
318120	2004 KG_{13}	—	May 19, 2004	Kitt Peak	Spacewatch	·	1.8 km	MPC · JPL
318121	2004 KL_{14}	—	May 23, 2004	Kitt Peak	Spacewatch	·	1.6 km	MPC · JPL
318122	2004 KH_{16}	—	May 24, 2004	Socorro	LINEAR	·	2.6 km	MPC · JPL
318123	2004 LD_{10}	—	June 14, 2004	Reedy Creek	J. Broughton	·	2.7 km	MPC · JPL
318124	2004 LA_{18}	—	June 15, 2004	Kitt Peak	Spacewatch	·	2.2 km	MPC · JPL
318125	2004 LZ_{20}	—	June 12, 2004	Kitt Peak	Spacewatch	·	1.6 km	MPC · JPL
318126	2004 NL_{9}	—	July 9, 2004	Socorro	LINEAR	·	2.0 km	MPC · JPL
318127	2004 NB_{13}	—	July 11, 2004	Socorro	LINEAR	·	1.9 km	MPC · JPL
318128	2004 NB_{22}	—	July 10, 2004	Palomar	NEAT	·	3.0 km	MPC · JPL
318129	2004 NS_{33}	—	July 15, 2004	Siding Spring	SSS	·	5.3 km	MPC · JPL
318130	2004 OL_{3}	—	July 16, 2004	Socorro	LINEAR	·	2.7 km	MPC · JPL
318131	2004 OK_{7}	—	July 16, 2004	Socorro	LINEAR	·	1.6 km	MPC · JPL
318132	2004 ON_{10}	—	July 21, 2004	Reedy Creek	J. Broughton	·	3.8 km	MPC · JPL
318133	2004 PF_{2}	—	August 7, 2004	Reedy Creek	J. Broughton	·	2.2 km	MPC · JPL
318134	2004 PT_{15}	—	August 7, 2004	Palomar	NEAT	·	1.9 km	MPC · JPL
318135	2004 PJ_{24}	—	August 8, 2004	Socorro	LINEAR	·	1.2 km	MPC · JPL
318136	2004 PM_{29}	—	August 7, 2004	Palomar	NEAT	·	1.8 km	MPC · JPL
318137	2004 PS_{33}	—	August 8, 2004	Anderson Mesa	LONEOS	(18466)	3.1 km	MPC · JPL
318138	2004 PK_{39}	—	August 9, 2004	Socorro	LINEAR	·	2.5 km	MPC · JPL
318139	2004 PB_{41}	—	August 9, 2004	Siding Spring	SSS	·	3.3 km	MPC · JPL
318140	2004 PL_{42}	—	August 10, 2004	Socorro	LINEAR	·	3.9 km	MPC · JPL
318141	2004 PD_{46}	—	August 7, 2004	Siding Spring	SSS	·	1.0 km	MPC · JPL
318142	2004 PO_{52}	—	August 8, 2004	Socorro	LINEAR	NYS	1.3 km	MPC · JPL
318143	2004 PO_{59}	—	August 9, 2004	Anderson Mesa	LONEOS	EOS	2.4 km	MPC · JPL
318144	2004 PR_{64}	—	August 10, 2004	Socorro	LINEAR	·	2.5 km	MPC · JPL
318145	2004 PQ_{66}	—	August 11, 2004	Socorro	LINEAR	·	2.8 km	MPC · JPL
318146	2004 PV_{69}	—	August 7, 2004	Palomar	NEAT	·	2.8 km	MPC · JPL
318147	2004 PL_{72}	—	August 8, 2004	Socorro	LINEAR	·	1.7 km	MPC · JPL
318148	2004 PG_{80}	—	August 9, 2004	Socorro	LINEAR	TIN	1.3 km	MPC · JPL
318149	2004 PC_{89}	—	August 8, 2004	Campo Imperatore	CINEOS	·	2.4 km	MPC · JPL
318150	2004 PV_{91}	—	August 12, 2004	Socorro	LINEAR	·	1.5 km	MPC · JPL
318151	2004 PZ_{91}	—	August 12, 2004	Socorro	LINEAR	·	3.0 km	MPC · JPL
318152	2004 PP_{94}	—	August 10, 2004	Anderson Mesa	LONEOS	DOR	3.0 km	MPC · JPL
318153	2004 PE_{102}	—	August 10, 2004	Anderson Mesa	LONEOS	·	3.1 km	MPC · JPL
318154	2004 PC_{103}	—	August 12, 2004	Socorro	LINEAR	·	3.6 km	MPC · JPL
318155	2004 PH_{103}	—	August 12, 2004	Socorro	LINEAR	·	4.6 km	MPC · JPL
318156	2004 PR_{113}	—	August 11, 2004	Socorro	LINEAR	NYS	1.3 km	MPC · JPL
318157	2004 PX_{113}	—	August 11, 2004	Socorro	LINEAR	·	2.1 km	MPC · JPL
318158	2004 PZ_{113}	—	August 8, 2004	Socorro	LINEAR	GEF	1.8 km	MPC · JPL
318159	2004 QH	—	August 17, 2004	Costitx	OAM	·	4.7 km	MPC · JPL
318160	2004 QZ_{2}	—	August 20, 2004	Catalina	CSS	AMO	750 m	MPC · JPL
318161	2004 QZ_{3}	—	August 16, 2004	Palomar	NEAT	T_{j} (2.99) · EUP	4.0 km	MPC · JPL
318162	2004 QU_{4}	—	August 20, 2004	Goodricke-Pigott	R. A. Tucker	·	3.8 km	MPC · JPL
318163	2004 QD_{13}	—	August 21, 2004	Siding Spring	SSS	TIR	3.2 km	MPC · JPL
318164	2004 QC_{15}	—	August 22, 2004	Kitt Peak	Spacewatch	·	2.7 km	MPC · JPL
318165	2004 QT_{18}	—	August 21, 2004	Catalina	CSS	BRA	2.0 km	MPC · JPL
318166	2004 QN_{21}	—	August 23, 2004	Kitt Peak	Spacewatch	MAS	880 m	MPC · JPL
318167	2004 QM_{24}	—	August 27, 2004	Socorro	LINEAR	EUP	6.0 km	MPC · JPL
318168	2004 RY	—	September 5, 2004	Kleť	Kleť	·	2.9 km	MPC · JPL
318169	2004 RZ_{3}	—	September 4, 2004	Palomar	NEAT	·	1.4 km	MPC · JPL
318170	2004 RO_{8}	—	September 6, 2004	Goodricke-Pigott	Goodricke-Pigott	·	4.2 km	MPC · JPL
318171	2004 RU_{11}	—	September 7, 2004	Socorro	LINEAR	·	2.7 km	MPC · JPL
318172	2004 RA_{15}	—	September 6, 2004	Siding Spring	SSS	EOS	2.5 km	MPC · JPL
318173	2004 RJ_{19}	—	September 7, 2004	Kitt Peak	Spacewatch	·	3.0 km	MPC · JPL
318174	2004 RW_{25}	—	September 9, 2004	Socorro	LINEAR	·	980 m	MPC · JPL
318175	2004 RD_{31}	—	September 7, 2004	Socorro	LINEAR	·	2.8 km	MPC · JPL
318176	2004 RK_{31}	—	September 7, 2004	Socorro	LINEAR	EOS	2.7 km	MPC · JPL
318177	2004 RX_{32}	—	September 7, 2004	Socorro	LINEAR	BRA	1.9 km	MPC · JPL
318178	2004 RZ_{35}	—	September 7, 2004	Socorro	LINEAR	·	910 m	MPC · JPL
318179	2004 RD_{56}	—	September 8, 2004	Socorro	LINEAR	·	2.8 km	MPC · JPL
318180	2004 RV_{59}	—	September 8, 2004	Socorro	LINEAR	·	2.5 km	MPC · JPL
318181	2004 RG_{60}	—	September 8, 2004	Socorro	LINEAR	·	750 m	MPC · JPL
318182	2004 RR_{62}	—	September 8, 2004	Socorro	LINEAR	·	3.0 km	MPC · JPL
318183	2004 RT_{66}	—	September 8, 2004	Socorro	LINEAR	·	3.2 km	MPC · JPL
318184	2004 RQ_{68}	—	September 8, 2004	Socorro	LINEAR	MAS	990 m	MPC · JPL
318185	2004 RD_{92}	—	September 8, 2004	Socorro	LINEAR	·	2.0 km	MPC · JPL
318186	2004 RP_{92}	—	September 8, 2004	Socorro	LINEAR	EOS	2.6 km	MPC · JPL
318187	2004 RQ_{99}	—	September 8, 2004	Socorro	LINEAR	·	2.7 km	MPC · JPL
318188	2004 RL_{100}	—	September 8, 2004	Socorro	LINEAR	·	1.9 km	MPC · JPL
318189	2004 RR_{100}	—	September 8, 2004	Socorro	LINEAR	·	2.9 km	MPC · JPL
318190	2004 RL_{102}	—	September 7, 2004	Goodricke-Pigott	R. A. Tucker	·	2.6 km	MPC · JPL
318191	2004 RN_{103}	—	September 8, 2004	Palomar	NEAT	·	2.8 km	MPC · JPL
318192	2004 RU_{103}	—	September 8, 2004	Palomar	NEAT	·	3.6 km	MPC · JPL
318193	2004 RU_{107}	—	September 9, 2004	Socorro	LINEAR	·	3.5 km	MPC · JPL
318194	2004 RB_{108}	—	August 25, 2004	Kitt Peak	Spacewatch	·	2.9 km	MPC · JPL
318195	2004 RK_{116}	—	September 7, 2004	Socorro	LINEAR	·	2.0 km	MPC · JPL
318196	2004 RG_{119}	—	September 7, 2004	Kitt Peak	Spacewatch	KOR	2.0 km	MPC · JPL
318197	2004 RH_{122}	—	September 7, 2004	Kitt Peak	Spacewatch	KOR	1.4 km	MPC · JPL
318198	2004 RJ_{125}	—	September 7, 2004	Kitt Peak	Spacewatch	·	1.1 km	MPC · JPL
318199	2004 RT_{131}	—	September 7, 2004	Kitt Peak	Spacewatch	KOR	1.4 km	MPC · JPL
318200	2004 RJ_{139}	—	September 8, 2004	Socorro	LINEAR	EOS	2.1 km	MPC · JPL

== 318201–318300 ==
back to top

Designation			Discovery			Properties		Ref
Permanent	Provisional	Named after	Date	Site	Discoverer(s)	Category	Diam.	Ref
318201	2004 RW_{139}	—	September 8, 2004	Socorro	LINEAR	·	1.2 km	MPC · JPL
318202	2004 RX_{141}	—	September 8, 2004	Socorro	LINEAR	·	4.2 km	MPC · JPL
318203	2004 RE_{143}	—	September 8, 2004	Palomar	NEAT	·	4.0 km	MPC · JPL
318204	2004 RQ_{160}	—	September 10, 2004	Kitt Peak	Spacewatch	·	1.3 km	MPC · JPL
318205	2004 RT_{168}	—	September 8, 2004	Socorro	LINEAR	·	2.8 km	MPC · JPL
318206	2004 RP_{174}	—	September 10, 2004	Socorro	LINEAR	·	1.9 km	MPC · JPL
318207	2004 RT_{174}	—	September 10, 2004	Socorro	LINEAR	GEF	1.6 km	MPC · JPL
318208	2004 RN_{175}	—	September 10, 2004	Socorro	LINEAR	·	3.6 km	MPC · JPL
318209	2004 RY_{175}	—	September 10, 2004	Socorro	LINEAR	·	3.9 km	MPC · JPL
318210	2004 RA_{180}	—	September 10, 2004	Socorro	LINEAR	·	3.7 km	MPC · JPL
318211	2004 RK_{182}	—	September 10, 2004	Socorro	LINEAR	·	990 m	MPC · JPL
318212	2004 RR_{182}	—	September 10, 2004	Socorro	LINEAR	·	1.3 km	MPC · JPL
318213	2004 RZ_{183}	—	September 10, 2004	Socorro	LINEAR	·	4.7 km	MPC · JPL
318214	2004 RM_{187}	—	September 10, 2004	Socorro	LINEAR	NAE	3.7 km	MPC · JPL
318215	2004 RT_{187}	—	September 10, 2004	Socorro	LINEAR	·	2.4 km	MPC · JPL
318216	2004 RE_{190}	—	September 10, 2004	Socorro	LINEAR	·	3.3 km	MPC · JPL
318217	2004 RP_{196}	—	September 10, 2004	Socorro	LINEAR	·	5.3 km	MPC · JPL
318218	2004 RD_{203}	—	September 11, 2004	Kitt Peak	Spacewatch	EOS	1.9 km	MPC · JPL
318219	2004 RA_{206}	—	September 10, 2004	Socorro	LINEAR	EOS	3.1 km	MPC · JPL
318220	2004 RK_{207}	—	September 11, 2004	Socorro	LINEAR	·	2.8 km	MPC · JPL
318221	2004 RO_{208}	—	September 11, 2004	Socorro	LINEAR	·	3.6 km	MPC · JPL
318222	2004 RL_{212}	—	September 11, 2004	Socorro	LINEAR	·	3.4 km	MPC · JPL
318223	2004 RU_{212}	—	September 11, 2004	Socorro	LINEAR	THB	6.0 km	MPC · JPL
318224	2004 RM_{214}	—	September 11, 2004	Socorro	LINEAR	·	2.6 km	MPC · JPL
318225	2004 RT_{215}	—	September 11, 2004	Socorro	LINEAR	·	5.5 km	MPC · JPL
318226	2004 RD_{218}	—	September 11, 2004	Socorro	LINEAR	URS	3.9 km	MPC · JPL
318227	2004 RE_{218}	—	September 11, 2004	Socorro	LINEAR	·	3.9 km	MPC · JPL
318228	2004 RJ_{219}	—	September 11, 2004	Socorro	LINEAR	·	3.7 km	MPC · JPL
318229	2004 RL_{219}	—	September 11, 2004	Socorro	LINEAR	EOS	2.8 km	MPC · JPL
318230	2004 RO_{222}	—	September 12, 2004	Socorro	LINEAR	·	4.1 km	MPC · JPL
318231	2004 RF_{225}	—	September 9, 2004	Socorro	LINEAR	EUP	4.9 km	MPC · JPL
318232	2004 RQ_{229}	—	September 9, 2004	Kitt Peak	Spacewatch	EOS	2.1 km	MPC · JPL
318233	2004 RO_{233}	—	September 9, 2004	Kitt Peak	Spacewatch	·	1.5 km	MPC · JPL
318234	2004 RB_{234}	—	September 9, 2004	Kitt Peak	Spacewatch	·	2.8 km	MPC · JPL
318235	2004 RP_{237}	—	September 10, 2004	Kitt Peak	Spacewatch	EOS	2.4 km	MPC · JPL
318236	2004 RN_{240}	—	September 10, 2004	Kitt Peak	Spacewatch	·	860 m	MPC · JPL
318237	2004 RD_{243}	—	September 10, 2004	Kitt Peak	Spacewatch	·	1.8 km	MPC · JPL
318238	2004 RM_{255}	—	September 6, 2004	Palomar	NEAT	ADE	2.7 km	MPC · JPL
318239	2004 RX_{268}	—	September 11, 2004	Kitt Peak	Spacewatch	·	1.6 km	MPC · JPL
318240	2004 RG_{272}	—	September 11, 2004	Kitt Peak	Spacewatch	·	3.2 km	MPC · JPL
318241	2004 RS_{272}	—	September 11, 2004	Kitt Peak	Spacewatch	·	3.0 km	MPC · JPL
318242	2004 RW_{275}	—	September 13, 2004	Kitt Peak	Spacewatch	·	2.0 km	MPC · JPL
318243	2004 RO_{283}	—	September 15, 2004	Kitt Peak	Spacewatch	·	1.2 km	MPC · JPL
318244	2004 RR_{285}	—	September 15, 2004	Kitt Peak	Spacewatch	KOR	1.4 km	MPC · JPL
318245	2004 RP_{292}	—	September 10, 2004	Kitt Peak	Spacewatch	(16286)	2.5 km	MPC · JPL
318246	2004 RJ_{298}	—	September 11, 2004	Kitt Peak	Spacewatch	·	1.7 km	MPC · JPL
318247	2004 RB_{305}	—	September 12, 2004	Kitt Peak	Spacewatch	EOS	1.5 km	MPC · JPL
318248	2004 RG_{308}	—	September 13, 2004	Socorro	LINEAR	·	3.3 km	MPC · JPL
318249	2004 RK_{309}	—	September 13, 2004	Socorro	LINEAR	·	4.9 km	MPC · JPL
318250	2004 RS_{311}	—	September 14, 2004	Palomar	NEAT	·	1.5 km	MPC · JPL
318251	2004 RQ_{315}	—	September 15, 2004	Siding Spring	SSS	TIR	3.6 km	MPC · JPL
318252	2004 RZ_{322}	—	September 13, 2004	Socorro	LINEAR	·	3.5 km	MPC · JPL
318253	2004 RV_{327}	—	September 14, 2004	Palomar	NEAT	·	3.5 km	MPC · JPL
318254	2004 RW_{328}	—	September 15, 2004	Anderson Mesa	LONEOS	·	3.3 km	MPC · JPL
318255	2004 RM_{336}	—	September 15, 2004	Kitt Peak	Spacewatch	LIX	3.6 km	MPC · JPL
318256	2004 RN_{338}	—	September 15, 2004	Kitt Peak	Spacewatch	·	830 m	MPC · JPL
318257	2004 RQ_{341}	—	September 7, 2004	Kitt Peak	Spacewatch	·	1.5 km	MPC · JPL
318258	2004 RW_{343}	—	August 27, 2004	Anderson Mesa	LONEOS	·	4.3 km	MPC · JPL
318259	2004 RY_{345}	—	September 9, 2004	Socorro	LINEAR	·	3.3 km	MPC · JPL
318260	2004 SE_{6}	—	September 17, 2004	Kitt Peak	Spacewatch	·	2.8 km	MPC · JPL
318261	2004 SF_{10}	—	September 16, 2004	Siding Spring	SSS	·	2.7 km	MPC · JPL
318262	2004 SP_{11}	—	September 16, 2004	Siding Spring	SSS	·	5.1 km	MPC · JPL
318263	2004 SF_{14}	—	September 17, 2004	Socorro	LINEAR	MAR	1.5 km	MPC · JPL
318264	2004 ST_{15}	—	September 7, 2004	Socorro	LINEAR	·	3.7 km	MPC · JPL
318265	2004 SF_{20}	—	September 17, 2004	Drebach	Drebach	EOS	2.6 km	MPC · JPL
318266	2004 SH_{20}	—	September 17, 2004	Desert Eagle	W. K. Y. Yeung	·	2.2 km	MPC · JPL
318267	2004 SG_{30}	—	September 17, 2004	Socorro	LINEAR	·	3.9 km	MPC · JPL
318268	2004 SA_{34}	—	September 17, 2004	Kitt Peak	Spacewatch	·	2.5 km	MPC · JPL
318269	2004 ST_{42}	—	September 18, 2004	Socorro	LINEAR	·	4.4 km	MPC · JPL
318270	2004 SW_{46}	—	September 18, 2004	Socorro	LINEAR	EOS	2.5 km	MPC · JPL
318271	2004 SO_{53}	—	September 22, 2004	Socorro	LINEAR	·	2.8 km	MPC · JPL
318272	2004 SW_{60}	—	September 17, 2004	Anderson Mesa	LONEOS	·	2.9 km	MPC · JPL
318273	2004 TP_{2}	—	October 4, 2004	Kitt Peak	Spacewatch	·	1.6 km	MPC · JPL
318274	2004 TR_{6}	—	October 3, 2004	Palomar	NEAT	·	2.5 km	MPC · JPL
318275	2004 TT_{14}	—	October 11, 2004	Sögel	Roclawski, H.	HNS	2.1 km	MPC · JPL
318276	2004 TH_{16}	—	October 10, 2004	Socorro	LINEAR	T_{j} (2.99) · EUP	3.9 km	MPC · JPL
318277	2004 TP_{16}	—	October 11, 2004	Moletai	K. Černis, Zdanavicius, J.	·	4.0 km	MPC · JPL
318278	2004 TH_{18}	—	October 11, 2004	Goodricke-Pigott	R. A. Tucker	·	3.6 km	MPC · JPL
318279	2004 TF_{31}	—	October 4, 2004	Kitt Peak	Spacewatch	·	3.8 km	MPC · JPL
318280	2004 TA_{33}	—	October 4, 2004	Kitt Peak	Spacewatch	EOS	2.1 km	MPC · JPL
318281	2004 TV_{33}	—	October 4, 2004	Anderson Mesa	LONEOS	·	3.7 km	MPC · JPL
318282	2004 TM_{34}	—	October 4, 2004	Kitt Peak	Spacewatch	·	3.0 km	MPC · JPL
318283	2004 TM_{35}	—	October 4, 2004	Kitt Peak	Spacewatch	·	2.2 km	MPC · JPL
318284	2004 TX_{36}	—	October 4, 2004	Kitt Peak	Spacewatch	THM	2.3 km	MPC · JPL
318285	2004 TM_{37}	—	October 4, 2004	Kitt Peak	Spacewatch	MAS	850 m	MPC · JPL
318286	2004 TS_{39}	—	October 4, 2004	Kitt Peak	Spacewatch	·	2.4 km	MPC · JPL
318287	2004 TG_{43}	—	October 4, 2004	Kitt Peak	Spacewatch	·	1.7 km	MPC · JPL
318288	2004 TC_{44}	—	October 4, 2004	Kitt Peak	Spacewatch	·	3.6 km	MPC · JPL
318289	2004 TA_{45}	—	October 4, 2004	Kitt Peak	Spacewatch	·	4.7 km	MPC · JPL
318290	2004 TW_{45}	—	October 4, 2004	Kitt Peak	Spacewatch	·	2.3 km	MPC · JPL
318291	2004 TV_{55}	—	October 4, 2004	Kitt Peak	Spacewatch	·	4.1 km	MPC · JPL
318292	2004 TE_{56}	—	October 4, 2004	Kitt Peak	Spacewatch	·	1.1 km	MPC · JPL
318293	2004 TR_{63}	—	October 5, 2004	Kitt Peak	Spacewatch	·	1.3 km	MPC · JPL
318294	2004 TV_{63}	—	October 5, 2004	Kitt Peak	Spacewatch	·	2.8 km	MPC · JPL
318295	2004 TQ_{68}	—	October 5, 2004	Anderson Mesa	LONEOS	·	3.6 km	MPC · JPL
318296	2004 TE_{70}	—	October 5, 2004	Palomar	NEAT	·	2.7 km	MPC · JPL
318297	2004 TK_{71}	—	October 6, 2004	Kitt Peak	Spacewatch	·	4.0 km	MPC · JPL
318298	2004 TF_{72}	—	October 6, 2004	Kitt Peak	Spacewatch	EOS	2.4 km	MPC · JPL
318299	2004 TD_{76}	—	October 7, 2004	Anderson Mesa	LONEOS	·	3.1 km	MPC · JPL
318300	2004 TW_{82}	—	October 5, 2004	Kitt Peak	Spacewatch	·	740 m	MPC · JPL

== 318301–318400 ==
back to top

Designation			Discovery			Properties		Ref
Permanent	Provisional	Named after	Date	Site	Discoverer(s)	Category	Diam.	Ref
318301	2004 TG_{84}	—	October 5, 2004	Kitt Peak	Spacewatch	EOS	2.0 km	MPC · JPL
318302	2004 TA_{87}	—	October 5, 2004	Kitt Peak	Spacewatch	AST	1.8 km	MPC · JPL
318303	2004 TP_{87}	—	October 5, 2004	Kitt Peak	Spacewatch	EOS	1.6 km	MPC · JPL
318304	2004 TU_{87}	—	October 5, 2004	Kitt Peak	Spacewatch	·	2.8 km	MPC · JPL
318305	2004 TR_{90}	—	October 5, 2004	Kitt Peak	Spacewatch	·	3.8 km	MPC · JPL
318306	2004 TO_{99}	—	October 5, 2004	Kitt Peak	Spacewatch	·	2.8 km	MPC · JPL
318307	2004 TF_{109}	—	October 7, 2004	Socorro	LINEAR	·	3.2 km	MPC · JPL
318308	2004 TV_{111}	—	October 7, 2004	Kitt Peak	Spacewatch	EOS	2.6 km	MPC · JPL
318309	2004 TN_{117}	—	October 5, 2004	Anderson Mesa	LONEOS	·	670 m	MPC · JPL
318310	2004 TQ_{129}	—	October 7, 2004	Socorro	LINEAR	·	3.0 km	MPC · JPL
318311	2004 TA_{130}	—	October 7, 2004	Socorro	LINEAR	VER	3.5 km	MPC · JPL
318312	2004 TU_{131}	—	October 7, 2004	Anderson Mesa	LONEOS	·	830 m	MPC · JPL
318313	2004 TH_{132}	—	October 7, 2004	Anderson Mesa	LONEOS	·	4.0 km	MPC · JPL
318314	2004 TM_{136}	—	October 8, 2004	Anderson Mesa	LONEOS	·	3.6 km	MPC · JPL
318315	2004 TJ_{143}	—	October 4, 2004	Kitt Peak	Spacewatch	EMA	3.5 km	MPC · JPL
318316	2004 TP_{145}	—	October 5, 2004	Kitt Peak	Spacewatch	·	1.2 km	MPC · JPL
318317	2004 TN_{148}	—	February 22, 2003	Kitt Peak	Spacewatch	·	1.1 km	MPC · JPL
318318	2004 TR_{148}	—	October 6, 2004	Kitt Peak	Spacewatch	·	2.9 km	MPC · JPL
318319	2004 TS_{149}	—	October 6, 2004	Kitt Peak	Spacewatch	·	2.1 km	MPC · JPL
318320	2004 TT_{157}	—	October 6, 2004	Kitt Peak	Spacewatch	·	770 m	MPC · JPL
318321	2004 TE_{164}	—	October 6, 2004	Kitt Peak	Spacewatch	·	1.2 km	MPC · JPL
318322	2004 TX_{169}	—	October 7, 2004	Socorro	LINEAR	·	3.2 km	MPC · JPL
318323	2004 TE_{175}	—	October 9, 2004	Socorro	LINEAR	·	800 m	MPC · JPL
318324	2004 TW_{177}	—	October 7, 2004	Kitt Peak	Spacewatch	KOR	1.8 km	MPC · JPL
318325	2004 TN_{187}	—	October 7, 2004	Kitt Peak	Spacewatch	(29841)	1.4 km	MPC · JPL
318326	2004 TQ_{189}	—	October 7, 2004	Kitt Peak	Spacewatch	·	1.5 km	MPC · JPL
318327	2004 TY_{190}	—	October 7, 2004	Kitt Peak	Spacewatch	·	2.6 km	MPC · JPL
318328	2004 TV_{195}	—	October 7, 2004	Kitt Peak	Spacewatch	EOS	2.6 km	MPC · JPL
318329	2004 TE_{198}	—	October 7, 2004	Kitt Peak	Spacewatch	·	3.7 km	MPC · JPL
318330	2004 TR_{198}	—	October 7, 2004	Kitt Peak	Spacewatch	·	1.7 km	MPC · JPL
318331	2004 TN_{200}	—	October 7, 2004	Kitt Peak	Spacewatch	VER	3.7 km	MPC · JPL
318332	2004 TE_{203}	—	October 7, 2004	Kitt Peak	Spacewatch	·	4.0 km	MPC · JPL
318333	2004 TT_{204}	—	October 7, 2004	Kitt Peak	Spacewatch	·	1.6 km	MPC · JPL
318334	2004 TN_{205}	—	October 7, 2004	Kitt Peak	Spacewatch	·	3.4 km	MPC · JPL
318335	2004 TY_{205}	—	October 7, 2004	Kitt Peak	Spacewatch	·	3.5 km	MPC · JPL
318336	2004 TD_{214}	—	October 9, 2004	Kitt Peak	Spacewatch	HYG	3.9 km	MPC · JPL
318337	2004 TT_{214}	—	October 9, 2004	Kitt Peak	Spacewatch	·	3.8 km	MPC · JPL
318338	2004 TY_{215}	—	October 10, 2004	Kitt Peak	Spacewatch	EOS	2.0 km	MPC · JPL
318339	2004 TS_{219}	—	October 5, 2004	Kitt Peak	Spacewatch	·	3.3 km	MPC · JPL
318340	2004 TW_{222}	—	October 7, 2004	Palomar	NEAT	·	3.9 km	MPC · JPL
318341	2004 TQ_{231}	—	October 8, 2004	Kitt Peak	Spacewatch	·	2.0 km	MPC · JPL
318342	2004 TG_{249}	—	October 7, 2004	Kitt Peak	Spacewatch	THM	2.9 km	MPC · JPL
318343	2004 TY_{262}	—	October 9, 2004	Kitt Peak	Spacewatch	·	2.9 km	MPC · JPL
318344	2004 TO_{264}	—	October 9, 2004	Kitt Peak	Spacewatch	VER	3.5 km	MPC · JPL
318345	2004 TT_{265}	—	October 9, 2004	Kitt Peak	Spacewatch	·	4.5 km	MPC · JPL
318346	2004 TH_{267}	—	October 9, 2004	Kitt Peak	Spacewatch	·	4.5 km	MPC · JPL
318347	2004 TX_{285}	—	October 8, 2004	Anderson Mesa	LONEOS	THM	2.8 km	MPC · JPL
318348	2004 TX_{289}	—	October 10, 2004	Socorro	LINEAR	·	4.3 km	MPC · JPL
318349	2004 TN_{294}	—	October 10, 2004	Kitt Peak	Spacewatch	·	3.8 km	MPC · JPL
318350	2004 TL_{309}	—	October 10, 2004	Socorro	LINEAR	·	2.7 km	MPC · JPL
318351	2004 TJ_{317}	—	October 11, 2004	Kitt Peak	Spacewatch	·	4.8 km	MPC · JPL
318352	2004 TJ_{318}	—	October 11, 2004	Kitt Peak	Spacewatch	·	2.3 km	MPC · JPL
318353	2004 TW_{318}	—	October 11, 2004	Kitt Peak	Spacewatch	·	2.6 km	MPC · JPL
318354	2004 TN_{322}	—	October 11, 2004	Kitt Peak	Spacewatch	·	690 m	MPC · JPL
318355	2004 TH_{327}	—	October 15, 2004	Kitt Peak	Spacewatch	·	3.2 km	MPC · JPL
318356	2004 TA_{331}	—	October 9, 2004	Kitt Peak	Spacewatch	·	4.1 km	MPC · JPL
318357	2004 TY_{337}	—	October 12, 2004	Kitt Peak	Spacewatch	·	2.5 km	MPC · JPL
318358	2004 TW_{344}	—	October 15, 2004	Kitt Peak	Spacewatch	·	5.1 km	MPC · JPL
318359	2004 TP_{349}	—	October 9, 2004	Socorro	LINEAR	·	2.4 km	MPC · JPL
318360	2004 TL_{354}	—	October 11, 2004	Kitt Peak	M. W. Buie	·	720 m	MPC · JPL
318361	2004 TZ_{355}	—	October 7, 2004	Socorro	LINEAR	·	2.9 km	MPC · JPL
318362	2004 TO_{357}	—	October 10, 2004	Kitt Peak	Spacewatch	·	3.4 km	MPC · JPL
318363	2004 UC_{1}	—	October 19, 2004	Drebach	G. Lehmann	HYG	3.3 km	MPC · JPL
318364	2004 UK_{6}	—	October 20, 2004	Socorro	LINEAR	·	2.9 km	MPC · JPL
318365	2004 VQ_{7}	—	November 3, 2004	Kitt Peak	Spacewatch	EOS	2.4 km	MPC · JPL
318366	2004 VF_{8}	—	November 3, 2004	Kitt Peak	Spacewatch	MAS	960 m	MPC · JPL
318367	2004 VG_{19}	—	November 4, 2004	Kitt Peak	Spacewatch	·	1.5 km	MPC · JPL
318368	2004 VK_{35}	—	November 3, 2004	Kitt Peak	Spacewatch	·	2.9 km	MPC · JPL
318369	2004 VR_{39}	—	November 4, 2004	Kitt Peak	Spacewatch	·	4.0 km	MPC · JPL
318370	2004 VT_{50}	—	November 4, 2004	Kitt Peak	Spacewatch	·	4.8 km	MPC · JPL
318371	2004 VH_{51}	—	November 4, 2004	Kitt Peak	Spacewatch	·	590 m	MPC · JPL
318372	2004 VQ_{53}	—	November 7, 2004	Socorro	LINEAR	·	2.4 km	MPC · JPL
318373	2004 VH_{60}	—	November 9, 2004	Catalina	CSS	·	2.0 km	MPC · JPL
318374	2004 VN_{63}	—	November 10, 2004	Kitt Peak	Spacewatch	·	1.7 km	MPC · JPL
318375	2004 VL_{71}	—	November 9, 2004	Catalina	CSS	·	4.5 km	MPC · JPL
318376	2004 VC_{74}	—	November 12, 2004	Catalina	CSS	·	3.6 km	MPC · JPL
318377	2004 VH_{74}	—	November 12, 2004	Catalina	CSS	·	4.6 km	MPC · JPL
318378	2004 VF_{85}	—	November 10, 2004	Kitt Peak	Spacewatch	·	3.5 km	MPC · JPL
318379	2004 VV_{98}	—	November 9, 2004	Mauna Kea	Veillet, C.	·	1.1 km	MPC · JPL
318380	2004 VY_{109}	—	November 9, 2004	Mauna Kea	Veillet, C.	·	3.5 km	MPC · JPL
318381	2004 WB_{7}	—	November 19, 2004	Socorro	LINEAR	·	3.8 km	MPC · JPL
318382	2004 WG_{8}	—	November 19, 2004	Catalina	CSS	MAS	930 m	MPC · JPL
318383	2004 WB_{11}	—	November 20, 2004	Kitt Peak	Spacewatch	·	720 m	MPC · JPL
318384	2004 XX_{7}	—	December 2, 2004	Palomar	NEAT	·	2.1 km	MPC · JPL
318385	2004 XA_{10}	—	December 2, 2004	Socorro	LINEAR	PHO	1.9 km	MPC · JPL
318386	2004 XF_{22}	—	December 8, 2004	Socorro	LINEAR	·	1.7 km	MPC · JPL
318387	2004 XK_{28}	—	December 10, 2004	Anderson Mesa	LONEOS	·	730 m	MPC · JPL
318388	2004 XE_{30}	—	December 10, 2004	Campo Imperatore	CINEOS	fast	1.3 km	MPC · JPL
318389	2004 XM_{36}	—	December 10, 2004	Socorro	LINEAR	EOS	5.3 km	MPC · JPL
318390	2004 XU_{43}	—	December 11, 2004	Kitt Peak	Spacewatch	·	690 m	MPC · JPL
318391	2004 XH_{49}	—	December 11, 2004	Kitt Peak	Spacewatch	(5)	1.8 km	MPC · JPL
318392	2004 XR_{61}	—	December 8, 2004	Needville	J. Dellinger	·	5.2 km	MPC · JPL
318393	2004 XU_{61}	—	December 10, 2004	Kitt Peak	Spacewatch	·	1.8 km	MPC · JPL
318394	2004 XM_{65}	—	December 2, 2004	Palomar	NEAT	EOS	3.2 km	MPC · JPL
318395	2004 XQ_{66}	—	December 3, 2004	Kitt Peak	Spacewatch	CYB	5.8 km	MPC · JPL
318396	2004 XQ_{77}	—	December 10, 2004	Socorro	LINEAR	·	720 m	MPC · JPL
318397	2004 XP_{82}	—	December 11, 2004	Kitt Peak	Spacewatch	·	1.4 km	MPC · JPL
318398	2004 XT_{92}	—	December 11, 2004	Socorro	LINEAR	·	1.5 km	MPC · JPL
318399	2004 XY_{97}	—	December 11, 2004	Kitt Peak	Spacewatch	·	1.6 km	MPC · JPL
318400	2004 XY_{109}	—	December 13, 2004	Anderson Mesa	LONEOS	·	960 m	MPC · JPL

== 318401–318500 ==
back to top

Designation			Discovery			Properties		Ref
Permanent	Provisional	Named after	Date	Site	Discoverer(s)	Category	Diam.	Ref
318401	2004 XT_{135}	—	December 15, 2004	Socorro	LINEAR	·	720 m	MPC · JPL
318402	2004 XJ_{163}	—	December 15, 2004	Kitt Peak	Spacewatch	·	780 m	MPC · JPL
318403	2004 XZ_{166}	—	December 2, 2004	Catalina	CSS	·	3.0 km	MPC · JPL
318404	2004 XO_{183}	—	December 3, 2004	Kitt Peak	Spacewatch	·	5.9 km	MPC · JPL
318405	2004 XF_{185}	—	December 11, 2004	Kitt Peak	Spacewatch	L5	10 km	MPC · JPL
318406	2004 YS_{19}	—	December 18, 2004	Mount Lemmon	Mount Lemmon Survey	·	610 m	MPC · JPL
318407	2004 YF_{22}	—	December 18, 2004	Mount Lemmon	Mount Lemmon Survey	L5	9.3 km	MPC · JPL
318408	2005 AO_{2}	—	January 6, 2005	Catalina	CSS	·	1.1 km	MPC · JPL
318409	2005 AM_{7}	—	January 6, 2005	Catalina	CSS	·	870 m	MPC · JPL
318410	2005 AF_{12}	—	January 6, 2005	Catalina	CSS	·	1.1 km	MPC · JPL
318411	2005 AH_{14}	—	January 7, 2005	Catalina	CSS	APO +1km	1.4 km	MPC · JPL
318412 Tramelan	2005 AB_{27}	Tramelan	January 11, 2005	Vicques	M. Ory	·	2.5 km	MPC · JPL
318413	2005 AK_{29}	—	January 14, 2005	Kvistaberg	Uppsala-DLR Asteroid Survey	·	840 m	MPC · JPL
318414	2005 AD_{41}	—	January 15, 2005	Socorro	LINEAR	·	2.9 km	MPC · JPL
318415	2005 AO_{42}	—	January 15, 2005	Catalina	CSS	·	880 m	MPC · JPL
318416	2005 AC_{48}	—	January 13, 2005	Kitt Peak	Spacewatch	·	840 m	MPC · JPL
318417	2005 AB_{63}	—	January 13, 2005	Kitt Peak	Spacewatch	·	2.8 km	MPC · JPL
318418	2005 AU_{67}	—	January 13, 2005	Socorro	LINEAR	(45637) · CYB	3.8 km	MPC · JPL
318419	2005 AB_{75}	—	January 15, 2005	Kitt Peak	Spacewatch	·	1.8 km	MPC · JPL
318420	2005 BM_{10}	—	January 16, 2005	Kitt Peak	Spacewatch	·	720 m	MPC · JPL
318421	2005 BE_{12}	—	January 17, 2005	Kitt Peak	Spacewatch	·	2.7 km	MPC · JPL
318422	2005 BG_{17}	—	January 16, 2005	Kitt Peak	Spacewatch	·	1.4 km	MPC · JPL
318423	2005 BS_{17}	—	January 16, 2005	Kitt Peak	Spacewatch	·	2.0 km	MPC · JPL
318424	2005 BD_{20}	—	January 16, 2005	Socorro	LINEAR	·	1.0 km	MPC · JPL
318425	2005 BZ_{22}	—	January 16, 2005	Kitt Peak	Spacewatch	·	2.2 km	MPC · JPL
318426	2005 BZ_{23}	—	January 17, 2005	Kitt Peak	Spacewatch	·	800 m	MPC · JPL
318427	2005 BA_{29}	—	January 31, 2005	Palomar	NEAT	·	900 m	MPC · JPL
318428	2005 BY_{44}	—	January 16, 2005	Mauna Kea	Veillet, C.	·	1.1 km	MPC · JPL
318429	2005 CG_{2}	—	February 1, 2005	Kitt Peak	Spacewatch	·	880 m	MPC · JPL
318430	2005 CL_{3}	—	February 1, 2005	Kitt Peak	Spacewatch	·	2.0 km	MPC · JPL
318431	2005 CS_{4}	—	February 1, 2005	Kitt Peak	Spacewatch	LUT	6.3 km	MPC · JPL
318432	2005 CP_{6}	—	February 1, 2005	Kitt Peak	Spacewatch	H	890 m	MPC · JPL
318433	2005 CA_{12}	—	February 1, 2005	Catalina	CSS	·	1.7 km	MPC · JPL
318434	2005 CR_{13}	—	February 2, 2005	Kitt Peak	Spacewatch	·	2.9 km	MPC · JPL
318435	2005 CD_{16}	—	February 2, 2005	Socorro	LINEAR	·	610 m	MPC · JPL
318436	2005 CU_{22}	—	February 1, 2005	Catalina	CSS	·	1.2 km	MPC · JPL
318437	2005 CY_{32}	—	February 2, 2005	Kitt Peak	Spacewatch	·	950 m	MPC · JPL
318438	2005 CD_{38}	—	February 3, 2005	Socorro	LINEAR	H	850 m	MPC · JPL
318439	2005 CL_{44}	—	February 2, 2005	Kitt Peak	Spacewatch	·	1.7 km	MPC · JPL
318440	2005 CS_{45}	—	February 2, 2005	Catalina	CSS	·	1.3 km	MPC · JPL
318441	2005 CY_{45}	—	February 2, 2005	Kitt Peak	Spacewatch	·	1.5 km	MPC · JPL
318442	2005 CL_{46}	—	February 2, 2005	Kitt Peak	Spacewatch	(5)	1.0 km	MPC · JPL
318443	2005 CO_{52}	—	February 3, 2005	Socorro	LINEAR	·	1.7 km	MPC · JPL
318444	2005 CT_{52}	—	February 3, 2005	Socorro	LINEAR	·	900 m	MPC · JPL
318445	2005 CF_{60}	—	February 3, 2005	Socorro	LINEAR	·	870 m	MPC · JPL
318446	2005 CY_{60}	—	February 9, 2005	Anderson Mesa	LONEOS	·	920 m	MPC · JPL
318447	2005 CX_{71}	—	February 1, 2005	Kitt Peak	Spacewatch	·	2.6 km	MPC · JPL
318448	2005 CN_{73}	—	February 1, 2005	Kitt Peak	Spacewatch	·	1.2 km	MPC · JPL
318449	2005 CR_{79}	—	February 1, 2005	Kitt Peak	Spacewatch	·	2.0 km	MPC · JPL
318450	2005 EJ	—	March 1, 2005	Socorro	LINEAR	AMO	340 m	MPC · JPL
318451	2005 ET_{1}	—	March 2, 2005	Altschwendt	W. Ries	PHO	1.5 km	MPC · JPL
318452	2005 EA_{3}	—	January 19, 2005	Kitt Peak	Spacewatch	(2076)	730 m	MPC · JPL
318453	2005 ET_{4}	—	March 1, 2005	Kitt Peak	Spacewatch	·	1.3 km	MPC · JPL
318454	2005 EP_{7}	—	March 1, 2005	Kitt Peak	Spacewatch	ERI	1.7 km	MPC · JPL
318455	2005 EW_{8}	—	March 2, 2005	Kitt Peak	Spacewatch	KOR	2.0 km	MPC · JPL
318456	2005 EV_{10}	—	March 2, 2005	Kitt Peak	Spacewatch	·	960 m	MPC · JPL
318457	2005 EH_{12}	—	January 7, 2005	Catalina	CSS	·	1.1 km	MPC · JPL
318458	2005 EF_{16}	—	March 3, 2005	Kitt Peak	Spacewatch	MAS	790 m	MPC · JPL
318459	2005 EC_{20}	—	March 3, 2005	Catalina	CSS	NYS	1.1 km	MPC · JPL
318460	2005 EF_{20}	—	March 3, 2005	Catalina	CSS	V	880 m	MPC · JPL
318461	2005 ET_{21}	—	March 3, 2005	Catalina	CSS	(2076)	930 m	MPC · JPL
318462	2005 EN_{24}	—	March 3, 2005	Catalina	CSS	·	1.1 km	MPC · JPL
318463	2005 EB_{26}	—	March 3, 2005	Catalina	CSS	·	1.0 km	MPC · JPL
318464	2005 EH_{29}	—	March 3, 2005	Catalina	CSS	·	970 m	MPC · JPL
318465	2005 EK_{33}	—	March 4, 2005	Socorro	LINEAR	·	1.1 km	MPC · JPL
318466	2005 EU_{40}	—	March 1, 2005	Kitt Peak	Spacewatch	·	1.4 km	MPC · JPL
318467	2005 ES_{41}	—	March 1, 2005	Kitt Peak	Spacewatch	·	1.2 km	MPC · JPL
318468	2005 EZ_{48}	—	March 3, 2005	Catalina	CSS	·	2.7 km	MPC · JPL
318469	2005 EK_{50}	—	March 3, 2005	Vail-Jarnac	Jarnac	(2076)	800 m	MPC · JPL
318470	2005 EX_{50}	—	March 3, 2005	Catalina	CSS	·	760 m	MPC · JPL
318471	2005 EU_{52}	—	March 4, 2005	Kitt Peak	Spacewatch	·	1.2 km	MPC · JPL
318472	2005 EA_{55}	—	March 4, 2005	Kitt Peak	Spacewatch	·	1.2 km	MPC · JPL
318473	2005 EJ_{58}	—	March 4, 2005	Kitt Peak	Spacewatch	·	950 m	MPC · JPL
318474	2005 EB_{64}	—	March 4, 2005	Mount Lemmon	Mount Lemmon Survey	·	1.6 km	MPC · JPL
318475	2005 EZ_{67}	—	March 7, 2005	Socorro	LINEAR	V	780 m	MPC · JPL
318476	2005 ED_{70}	—	March 7, 2005	Socorro	LINEAR	H	690 m	MPC · JPL
318477	2005 EZ_{72}	—	November 18, 2003	Kitt Peak	Spacewatch	·	1.3 km	MPC · JPL
318478	2005 EE_{74}	—	March 3, 2005	Kitt Peak	Spacewatch	·	1.2 km	MPC · JPL
318479	2005 EF_{75}	—	March 3, 2005	Kitt Peak	Spacewatch	3:2	5.6 km	MPC · JPL
318480	2005 EB_{87}	—	March 4, 2005	Mount Lemmon	Mount Lemmon Survey	MAS	740 m	MPC · JPL
318481	2005 EC_{89}	—	March 8, 2005	Kitt Peak	Spacewatch	NYS	1.1 km	MPC · JPL
318482	2005 EF_{89}	—	March 8, 2005	Kitt Peak	Spacewatch	(2076)	790 m	MPC · JPL
318483	2005 ES_{94}	—	March 1, 2005	Kitt Peak	Spacewatch	·	2.0 km	MPC · JPL
318484	2005 EA_{98}	—	March 3, 2005	Catalina	CSS	(2076)	1.3 km	MPC · JPL
318485	2005 EF_{99}	—	March 3, 2005	Catalina	CSS	·	1.1 km	MPC · JPL
318486	2005 ED_{104}	—	March 4, 2005	Kitt Peak	Spacewatch	MAS	930 m	MPC · JPL
318487	2005 EX_{110}	—	March 4, 2005	Socorro	LINEAR	NYS	1.1 km	MPC · JPL
318488	2005 ER_{114}	—	March 4, 2005	Mount Lemmon	Mount Lemmon Survey	AST	1.8 km	MPC · JPL
318489	2005 EK_{117}	—	March 4, 2005	Mount Lemmon	Mount Lemmon Survey	·	1.1 km	MPC · JPL
318490	2005 EF_{119}	—	March 7, 2005	Socorro	LINEAR	·	1.1 km	MPC · JPL
318491	2005 EF_{120}	—	March 8, 2005	Kitt Peak	Spacewatch	·	1.2 km	MPC · JPL
318492	2005 EW_{120}	—	March 8, 2005	Kitt Peak	Spacewatch	·	1.4 km	MPC · JPL
318493	2005 EA_{121}	—	March 8, 2005	Socorro	LINEAR	slow	1.0 km	MPC · JPL
318494	2005 EW_{128}	—	March 9, 2005	Kitt Peak	Spacewatch	·	920 m	MPC · JPL
318495	2005 EJ_{136}	—	March 9, 2005	Anderson Mesa	LONEOS	·	850 m	MPC · JPL
318496	2005 EK_{136}	—	March 9, 2005	Anderson Mesa	LONEOS	PHO	1.2 km	MPC · JPL
318497	2005 EP_{137}	—	March 9, 2005	Socorro	LINEAR	·	1.7 km	MPC · JPL
318498	2005 EZ_{138}	—	March 9, 2005	Mount Lemmon	Mount Lemmon Survey	·	1.1 km	MPC · JPL
318499	2005 EL_{145}	—	March 10, 2005	Mount Lemmon	Mount Lemmon Survey	·	1.1 km	MPC · JPL
318500	2005 EW_{145}	—	March 10, 2005	Mount Lemmon	Mount Lemmon Survey	·	820 m	MPC · JPL

== 318501–318600 ==
back to top

Designation			Discovery			Properties		Ref
Permanent	Provisional	Named after	Date	Site	Discoverer(s)	Category	Diam.	Ref
318501	2005 EX_{147}	—	March 10, 2005	Kitt Peak	Spacewatch	MAS	740 m	MPC · JPL
318502	2005 ED_{149}	—	March 10, 2005	Kitt Peak	Spacewatch	NYS	1.1 km	MPC · JPL
318503	2005 ET_{149}	—	March 10, 2005	Kitt Peak	Spacewatch	·	1.2 km	MPC · JPL
318504	2005 EV_{150}	—	March 10, 2005	Kitt Peak	Spacewatch	·	2.4 km	MPC · JPL
318505	2005 EB_{155}	—	March 8, 2005	Mount Lemmon	Mount Lemmon Survey	·	1.1 km	MPC · JPL
318506	2005 ER_{155}	—	March 8, 2005	Mount Lemmon	Mount Lemmon Survey	MAS	1.1 km	MPC · JPL
318507	2005 EL_{156}	—	March 9, 2005	Catalina	CSS	·	1.2 km	MPC · JPL
318508	2005 EC_{161}	—	March 9, 2005	Mount Lemmon	Mount Lemmon Survey	MAS	650 m	MPC · JPL
318509	2005 ES_{161}	—	March 9, 2005	Mount Lemmon	Mount Lemmon Survey	·	860 m	MPC · JPL
318510	2005 EA_{167}	—	March 11, 2005	Mount Lemmon	Mount Lemmon Survey	NYS	770 m	MPC · JPL
318511	2005 EW_{170}	—	March 7, 2005	Socorro	LINEAR	·	1.5 km	MPC · JPL
318512	2005 EN_{173}	—	March 8, 2005	Anderson Mesa	LONEOS	·	1.4 km	MPC · JPL
318513	2005 EV_{176}	—	March 8, 2005	Mount Lemmon	Mount Lemmon Survey	V	680 m	MPC · JPL
318514	2005 EA_{180}	—	March 9, 2005	Kitt Peak	Spacewatch	·	920 m	MPC · JPL
318515	2005 EZ_{182}	—	March 9, 2005	Mount Lemmon	Mount Lemmon Survey	·	1.6 km	MPC · JPL
318516	2005 EB_{187}	—	March 10, 2005	Mount Lemmon	Mount Lemmon Survey	NYS	1.2 km	MPC · JPL
318517	2005 EM_{188}	—	March 10, 2005	Mount Lemmon	Mount Lemmon Survey	PHO	1.6 km	MPC · JPL
318518	2005 EU_{191}	—	March 11, 2005	Mount Lemmon	Mount Lemmon Survey	·	910 m	MPC · JPL
318519	2005 EE_{196}	—	March 11, 2005	Mount Lemmon	Mount Lemmon Survey	·	1.2 km	MPC · JPL
318520	2005 EW_{202}	—	March 10, 2005	Mount Lemmon	Mount Lemmon Survey	·	1.3 km	MPC · JPL
318521	2005 EC_{203}	—	March 10, 2005	Mount Lemmon	Mount Lemmon Survey	·	1.1 km	MPC · JPL
318522	2005 ED_{203}	—	March 10, 2005	Mount Lemmon	Mount Lemmon Survey	·	790 m	MPC · JPL
318523	2005 ED_{220}	—	March 10, 2005	Siding Spring	SSS	·	2.5 km	MPC · JPL
318524	2005 EV_{226}	—	March 9, 2005	Mount Lemmon	Mount Lemmon Survey	·	960 m	MPC · JPL
318525	2005 EA_{233}	—	March 10, 2005	Anderson Mesa	LONEOS	·	1.0 km	MPC · JPL
318526	2005 EX_{240}	—	March 11, 2005	Catalina	CSS	·	920 m	MPC · JPL
318527	2005 EY_{245}	—	March 12, 2005	Kitt Peak	Spacewatch	NYS	1.0 km	MPC · JPL
318528	2005 EB_{246}	—	March 12, 2005	Kitt Peak	Spacewatch	·	1.2 km	MPC · JPL
318529	2005 EF_{246}	—	March 12, 2005	Kitt Peak	Spacewatch	·	2.8 km	MPC · JPL
318530	2005 EQ_{250}	—	March 13, 2005	Anderson Mesa	LONEOS	H	740 m	MPC · JPL
318531	2005 EU_{250}	—	March 9, 2005	Socorro	LINEAR	·	1.1 km	MPC · JPL
318532	2005 EC_{264}	—	September 27, 2003	Kitt Peak	Spacewatch	NYS	970 m	MPC · JPL
318533	2005 ER_{268}	—	March 14, 2005	Mount Lemmon	Mount Lemmon Survey	AGN	1.5 km	MPC · JPL
318534	2005 EX_{269}	—	March 11, 2005	Kitt Peak	Spacewatch	·	1.2 km	MPC · JPL
318535	2005 EY_{269}	—	March 11, 2005	Kitt Peak	Spacewatch	·	890 m	MPC · JPL
318536	2005 EX_{322}	—	March 1, 2005	Catalina	CSS	EUN	1.8 km	MPC · JPL
318537	2005 FA_{6}	—	March 31, 2005	Siding Spring	Siding Spring	TIR	2.8 km	MPC · JPL
318538	2005 FE_{6}	—	March 31, 2005	Palomar	NEAT	·	1.5 km	MPC · JPL
318539	2005 FX_{6}	—	March 30, 2005	Catalina	CSS	·	1.3 km	MPC · JPL
318540	2005 GO_{2}	—	April 1, 2005	Anderson Mesa	LONEOS	·	1.5 km	MPC · JPL
318541	2005 GS_{2}	—	April 1, 2005	Kitt Peak	Spacewatch	·	940 m	MPC · JPL
318542	2005 GH_{3}	—	April 1, 2005	Kitt Peak	Spacewatch	ERI	1.9 km	MPC · JPL
318543	2005 GT_{3}	—	April 1, 2005	Kitt Peak	Spacewatch	NYS	1.1 km	MPC · JPL
318544	2005 GP_{5}	—	April 1, 2005	Kitt Peak	Spacewatch	·	1.6 km	MPC · JPL
318545	2005 GQ_{6}	—	April 1, 2005	Kitt Peak	Spacewatch	NYS	990 m	MPC · JPL
318546	2005 GG_{7}	—	April 1, 2005	Kitt Peak	Spacewatch	·	1.3 km	MPC · JPL
318547 Fidrich	2005 GV_{8}	Fidrich	April 2, 2005	Piszkéstető	K. Sárneczky	·	920 m	MPC · JPL
318548	2005 GG_{15}	—	April 2, 2005	Mount Lemmon	Mount Lemmon Survey	MAS	660 m	MPC · JPL
318549	2005 GV_{16}	—	April 2, 2005	Mount Lemmon	Mount Lemmon Survey	·	1.6 km	MPC · JPL
318550	2005 GG_{27}	—	April 3, 2005	Palomar	NEAT	PHO	1.1 km	MPC · JPL
318551	2005 GL_{37}	—	April 2, 2005	Siding Spring	SSS	·	2.7 km	MPC · JPL
318552	2005 GC_{39}	—	April 4, 2005	Mount Lemmon	Mount Lemmon Survey	·	730 m	MPC · JPL
318553	2005 GB_{42}	—	April 5, 2005	Mount Lemmon	Mount Lemmon Survey	·	2.0 km	MPC · JPL
318554	2005 GM_{54}	—	March 17, 2005	Kitt Peak	Spacewatch	PAD	1.9 km	MPC · JPL
318555	2005 GV_{70}	—	April 4, 2005	Mount Lemmon	Mount Lemmon Survey	·	920 m	MPC · JPL
318556	2005 GQ_{74}	—	April 5, 2005	Mount Lemmon	Mount Lemmon Survey	NYS	1.1 km	MPC · JPL
318557	2005 GP_{87}	—	April 4, 2005	Mount Lemmon	Mount Lemmon Survey	·	1.1 km	MPC · JPL
318558	2005 GC_{94}	—	April 6, 2005	Mount Lemmon	Mount Lemmon Survey	·	890 m	MPC · JPL
318559	2005 GU_{100}	—	April 9, 2005	Kitt Peak	Spacewatch	NYS	1.5 km	MPC · JPL
318560	2005 GO_{103}	—	April 9, 2005	Mount Lemmon	Mount Lemmon Survey	·	1.2 km	MPC · JPL
318561	2005 GC_{113}	—	April 6, 2005	Catalina	CSS	PHO	1.0 km	MPC · JPL
318562	2005 GA_{116}	—	April 11, 2005	Kitt Peak	Spacewatch	·	1.2 km	MPC · JPL
318563	2005 GD_{117}	—	April 11, 2005	Kitt Peak	Spacewatch	NYS	1.2 km	MPC · JPL
318564	2005 GY_{117}	—	April 11, 2005	Mount Lemmon	Mount Lemmon Survey	·	960 m	MPC · JPL
318565	2005 GX_{118}	—	April 11, 2005	Mount Lemmon	Mount Lemmon Survey	·	910 m	MPC · JPL
318566	2005 GV_{123}	—	April 9, 2005	Kitt Peak	Spacewatch	V	700 m	MPC · JPL
318567	2005 GH_{132}	—	April 10, 2005	Kitt Peak	Spacewatch	·	1.1 km	MPC · JPL
318568	2005 GV_{132}	—	April 10, 2005	Kitt Peak	Spacewatch	·	1.0 km	MPC · JPL
318569	2005 GA_{135}	—	April 10, 2005	Mount Lemmon	Mount Lemmon Survey	NYS	1.1 km	MPC · JPL
318570	2005 GT_{136}	—	April 10, 2005	Kitt Peak	Spacewatch	·	1.4 km	MPC · JPL
318571	2005 GO_{139}	—	April 12, 2005	Kitt Peak	Spacewatch	GEF	1.6 km	MPC · JPL
318572	2005 GL_{141}	—	April 6, 2005	Mount Lemmon	Mount Lemmon Survey	·	980 m	MPC · JPL
318573	2005 GO_{141}	—	April 7, 2005	Kitt Peak	Spacewatch	·	2.3 km	MPC · JPL
318574	2005 GL_{144}	—	April 10, 2005	Kitt Peak	Spacewatch	V	920 m	MPC · JPL
318575	2005 GY_{146}	—	April 11, 2005	Kitt Peak	Spacewatch	·	1.6 km	MPC · JPL
318576	2005 GY_{148}	—	April 11, 2005	Kitt Peak	Spacewatch	·	1.3 km	MPC · JPL
318577	2005 GN_{151}	—	April 11, 2005	Kitt Peak	Spacewatch	·	1.5 km	MPC · JPL
318578	2005 GG_{152}	—	April 12, 2005	Kitt Peak	Spacewatch	·	1.1 km	MPC · JPL
318579	2005 GH_{156}	—	April 10, 2005	Mount Lemmon	Mount Lemmon Survey	·	1.2 km	MPC · JPL
318580	2005 GL_{162}	—	April 12, 2005	Siding Spring	SSS	·	1.4 km	MPC · JPL
318581	2005 GE_{168}	—	April 11, 2005	Mount Lemmon	Mount Lemmon Survey	NYS	1.5 km	MPC · JPL
318582	2005 GT_{170}	—	April 12, 2005	Anderson Mesa	LONEOS	·	1.6 km	MPC · JPL
318583	2005 GP_{180}	—	April 12, 2005	Kitt Peak	Spacewatch	MAS	790 m	MPC · JPL
318584	2005 GV_{187}	—	April 12, 2005	Kitt Peak	M. W. Buie	·	1.0 km	MPC · JPL
318585	2005 GA_{188}	—	April 12, 2005	Kitt Peak	M. W. Buie	·	1.1 km	MPC · JPL
318586	2005 GR_{189}	—	November 30, 2003	Kitt Peak	Spacewatch	NYS	1.4 km	MPC · JPL
318587	2005 GS_{220}	—	April 5, 2005	Mount Lemmon	Mount Lemmon Survey	·	1.6 km	MPC · JPL
318588	2005 GK_{227}	—	April 12, 2005	Kitt Peak	Spacewatch	·	1.4 km	MPC · JPL
318589	2005 GU_{227}	—	April 3, 2005	Palomar	NEAT	·	1.2 km	MPC · JPL
318590	2005 HF_{2}	—	April 16, 2005	Kitt Peak	Spacewatch	·	820 m	MPC · JPL
318591	2005 HM_{2}	—	April 17, 2005	Kitt Peak	Spacewatch	NYS	1.4 km	MPC · JPL
318592	2005 HB_{3}	—	April 16, 2005	Cordell-Lorenz	D. T. Durig	·	950 m	MPC · JPL
318593	2005 JH_{2}	—	May 3, 2005	Kitt Peak	Spacewatch	·	1.1 km	MPC · JPL
318594	2005 JG_{4}	—	May 3, 2005	Catalina	CSS	·	1.6 km	MPC · JPL
318595	2005 JA_{25}	—	May 3, 2005	Kitt Peak	Spacewatch	MAS	870 m	MPC · JPL
318596	2005 JN_{29}	—	May 3, 2005	Catalina	CSS	PHO	1.6 km	MPC · JPL
318597	2005 JH_{30}	—	May 4, 2005	Mount Lemmon	Mount Lemmon Survey	·	910 m	MPC · JPL
318598	2005 JB_{40}	—	May 7, 2005	Mount Lemmon	Mount Lemmon Survey	NYS	1.2 km	MPC · JPL
318599	2005 JM_{43}	—	December 19, 2003	Kitt Peak	Spacewatch	THM	3.3 km	MPC · JPL
318600	2005 JL_{44}	—	May 8, 2005	Anderson Mesa	LONEOS	MAS	970 m	MPC · JPL

== 318601–318700 ==
back to top

Designation			Discovery			Properties		Ref
Permanent	Provisional	Named after	Date	Site	Discoverer(s)	Category	Diam.	Ref
318601	2005 JX_{45}	—	May 3, 2005	Kitt Peak	Deep Lens Survey	·	4.7 km	MPC · JPL
318602	2005 JL_{48}	—	May 3, 2005	Kitt Peak	Spacewatch	·	1.5 km	MPC · JPL
318603	2005 JW_{51}	—	May 4, 2005	Kitt Peak	Spacewatch	·	4.1 km	MPC · JPL
318604	2005 JN_{54}	—	May 4, 2005	Kitt Peak	Spacewatch	·	1.6 km	MPC · JPL
318605	2005 JB_{55}	—	May 4, 2005	Kitt Peak	Spacewatch	·	1.1 km	MPC · JPL
318606	2005 JN_{55}	—	May 4, 2005	Kitt Peak	Spacewatch	·	4.1 km	MPC · JPL
318607	2005 JC_{57}	—	May 7, 2005	Kitt Peak	Spacewatch	·	1.8 km	MPC · JPL
318608	2005 JK_{58}	—	May 7, 2005	Catalina	CSS	·	1.6 km	MPC · JPL
318609	2005 JM_{63}	—	May 3, 2005	Catalina	CSS	EUP	3.7 km	MPC · JPL
318610	2005 JS_{64}	—	May 4, 2005	Kitt Peak	Spacewatch	EOS	2.0 km	MPC · JPL
318611	2005 JY_{65}	—	May 4, 2005	Kitt Peak	Spacewatch	·	3.6 km	MPC · JPL
318612	2005 JT_{66}	—	May 4, 2005	Palomar	NEAT	·	1.1 km	MPC · JPL
318613	2005 JJ_{69}	—	May 6, 2005	Kitt Peak	Spacewatch	·	3.6 km	MPC · JPL
318614	2005 JD_{74}	—	May 8, 2005	Kitt Peak	Spacewatch	EOS	3.0 km	MPC · JPL
318615	2005 JS_{75}	—	May 9, 2005	Anderson Mesa	LONEOS	NYS	1.2 km	MPC · JPL
318616	2005 JA_{80}	—	May 10, 2005	Mount Lemmon	Mount Lemmon Survey	·	1.4 km	MPC · JPL
318617	2005 JP_{82}	—	May 7, 2005	Mount Lemmon	Mount Lemmon Survey	·	1.1 km	MPC · JPL
318618	2005 JK_{92}	—	May 11, 2005	Palomar	NEAT	·	4.6 km	MPC · JPL
318619	2005 JV_{102}	—	May 9, 2005	Catalina	CSS	·	1.7 km	MPC · JPL
318620	2005 JJ_{110}	—	May 8, 2005	Mount Lemmon	Mount Lemmon Survey	NYS	1.3 km	MPC · JPL
318621	2005 JF_{114}	—	May 10, 2005	Kitt Peak	Spacewatch	·	4.1 km	MPC · JPL
318622	2005 JR_{131}	—	May 13, 2005	Kitt Peak	Spacewatch	·	2.8 km	MPC · JPL
318623	2005 JK_{137}	—	May 13, 2005	Kitt Peak	Spacewatch	NYS	890 m	MPC · JPL
318624	2005 JZ_{137}	—	May 13, 2005	Kitt Peak	Spacewatch	·	1.5 km	MPC · JPL
318625	2005 JU_{142}	—	May 15, 2005	Palomar	NEAT	·	5.3 km	MPC · JPL
318626	2005 JU_{164}	—	May 10, 2005	Mount Lemmon	Mount Lemmon Survey	KOR	1.4 km	MPC · JPL
318627	2005 JH_{170}	—	May 9, 2005	Socorro	LINEAR	·	1.3 km	MPC · JPL
318628	2005 JB_{177}	—	May 11, 2005	Palomar	NEAT	·	840 m	MPC · JPL
318629	2005 JH_{185}	—	May 14, 2005	Kitt Peak	Spacewatch	V	730 m	MPC · JPL
318630	2005 KS_{2}	—	May 16, 2005	Mount Lemmon	Mount Lemmon Survey	·	2.8 km	MPC · JPL
318631	2005 KE_{5}	—	May 18, 2005	Palomar	NEAT	·	1.2 km	MPC · JPL
318632	2005 KP_{6}	—	May 18, 2005	Siding Spring	SSS	·	1.6 km	MPC · JPL
318633	2005 LG_{5}	—	June 1, 2005	Kitt Peak	Spacewatch	·	1.5 km	MPC · JPL
318634	2005 LG_{7}	—	June 1, 2005	Kitt Peak	Spacewatch	L4	10 km	MPC · JPL
318635	2005 LN_{12}	—	June 6, 2005	Vail-Jarnac	Jarnac	·	2.8 km	MPC · JPL
318636	2005 LB_{13}	—	June 4, 2005	Kitt Peak	Spacewatch	·	1.7 km	MPC · JPL
318637	2005 LE_{18}	—	June 6, 2005	Kitt Peak	Spacewatch	·	2.0 km	MPC · JPL
318638	2005 LC_{25}	—	June 8, 2005	Kitt Peak	Spacewatch	·	3.7 km	MPC · JPL
318639	2005 LH_{29}	—	May 27, 2005	Campo Imperatore	CINEOS	V	830 m	MPC · JPL
318640	2005 LT_{37}	—	June 11, 2005	Kitt Peak	Spacewatch	·	1.2 km	MPC · JPL
318641	2005 LZ_{38}	—	June 11, 2005	Kitt Peak	Spacewatch	L4	10 km	MPC · JPL
318642	2005 LA_{41}	—	June 10, 2005	Kitt Peak	Spacewatch	NYS	1.2 km	MPC · JPL
318643	2005 LW_{49}	—	June 11, 2005	Kitt Peak	Spacewatch	PHO	1.3 km	MPC · JPL
318644	2005 MJ_{4}	—	June 16, 2005	Kitt Peak	Spacewatch	NYS	1.2 km	MPC · JPL
318645	2005 MW_{15}	—	June 24, 2005	Palomar	NEAT	·	1.5 km	MPC · JPL
318646	2005 MH_{26}	—	June 28, 2005	Kitt Peak	Spacewatch	NYS	1.8 km	MPC · JPL
318647	2005 MJ_{26}	—	June 28, 2005	Kitt Peak	Spacewatch	·	1.6 km	MPC · JPL
318648	2005 MV_{27}	—	December 19, 2001	Socorro	LINEAR	EOS	2.4 km	MPC · JPL
318649	2005 MW_{37}	—	June 30, 2005	Palomar	NEAT	·	1.3 km	MPC · JPL
318650	2005 MJ_{41}	—	June 30, 2005	Kitt Peak	Spacewatch	·	1.5 km	MPC · JPL
318651	2005 MF_{43}	—	June 28, 2005	Palomar	NEAT	·	2.3 km	MPC · JPL
318652	2005 MR_{45}	—	June 27, 2005	Kitt Peak	Spacewatch	·	1.3 km	MPC · JPL
318653	2005 MC_{47}	—	June 28, 2005	Palomar	NEAT	·	940 m	MPC · JPL
318654	2005 MJ_{48}	—	June 29, 2005	Kitt Peak	Spacewatch	·	1.3 km	MPC · JPL
318655	2005 MY_{49}	—	June 30, 2005	Kitt Peak	Spacewatch	·	1.2 km	MPC · JPL
318656	2005 NY_{3}	—	July 2, 2005	Kitt Peak	Spacewatch	·	910 m	MPC · JPL
318657	2005 NZ_{4}	—	July 3, 2005	Mount Lemmon	Mount Lemmon Survey	NYS	1.3 km	MPC · JPL
318658	2005 NF_{12}	—	July 4, 2005	Mount Lemmon	Mount Lemmon Survey	V	710 m	MPC · JPL
318659	2005 NU_{13}	—	July 5, 2005	Kitt Peak	Spacewatch	NYS	1.3 km	MPC · JPL
318660	2005 NE_{18}	—	July 4, 2005	Mount Lemmon	Mount Lemmon Survey	·	1.3 km	MPC · JPL
318661	2005 NK_{26}	—	July 5, 2005	Mount Lemmon	Mount Lemmon Survey	·	1.3 km	MPC · JPL
318662	2005 NC_{49}	—	July 6, 2005	Siding Spring	SSS	MAR	1.6 km	MPC · JPL
318663	2005 NN_{55}	—	July 7, 2005	Reedy Creek	J. Broughton	·	920 m	MPC · JPL
318664	2005 NO_{59}	—	July 9, 2005	Kitt Peak	Spacewatch	·	1.7 km	MPC · JPL
318665	2005 NT_{76}	—	July 10, 2005	Kitt Peak	Spacewatch	·	1.2 km	MPC · JPL
318666	2005 NJ_{124}	—	July 12, 2005	Kitt Peak	Spacewatch	·	2.1 km	MPC · JPL
318667	2005 ON_{9}	—	July 27, 2005	Palomar	NEAT	·	1.6 km	MPC · JPL
318668	2005 OH_{13}	—	July 29, 2005	Palomar	NEAT	H	680 m	MPC · JPL
318669	2005 OC_{16}	—	July 29, 2005	Palomar	NEAT	·	2.4 km	MPC · JPL
318670	2005 OY_{19}	—	July 28, 2005	Palomar	NEAT	·	1.9 km	MPC · JPL
318671	2005 OF_{21}	—	July 28, 2005	Palomar	NEAT	MAS	960 m	MPC · JPL
318672	2005 PN	—	August 3, 2005	Haleakala	NEAT	T_{j} (2.96)	2.9 km	MPC · JPL
318673	2005 PY_{9}	—	August 4, 2005	Palomar	NEAT	3:2	5.7 km	MPC · JPL
318674	2005 PE_{11}	—	August 4, 2005	Palomar	NEAT	·	1.1 km	MPC · JPL
318675	2005 PA_{16}	—	August 4, 2005	Palomar	NEAT	·	1.5 km	MPC · JPL
318676 Bellelay	2005 PS_{16}	Bellelay	August 10, 2005	Vicques	M. Ory	·	2.8 km	MPC · JPL
318677	2005 PO_{19}	—	August 5, 2005	Palomar	NEAT	·	1.9 km	MPC · JPL
318678	2005 QP_{16}	—	August 25, 2005	Palomar	NEAT	·	2.1 km	MPC · JPL
318679	2005 QH_{17}	—	August 25, 2005	Palomar	NEAT	ERI	2.5 km	MPC · JPL
318680	2005 QD_{18}	—	August 25, 2005	Palomar	NEAT	·	1.9 km	MPC · JPL
318681	2005 QZ_{22}	—	August 27, 2005	Kitt Peak	Spacewatch	NYS	990 m	MPC · JPL
318682 Carpaccio	2005 QO_{30}	Carpaccio	August 29, 2005	Saint-Sulpice	B. Christophe	·	1.8 km	MPC · JPL
318683	2005 QD_{35}	—	August 25, 2005	Palomar	NEAT	·	1.9 km	MPC · JPL
318684	2005 QM_{49}	—	August 26, 2005	Palomar	NEAT	·	1.4 km	MPC · JPL
318685	2005 QG_{52}	—	August 27, 2005	Anderson Mesa	LONEOS	JUN	1.2 km	MPC · JPL
318686	2005 QH_{52}	—	August 27, 2005	Anderson Mesa	LONEOS	·	2.4 km	MPC · JPL
318687	2005 QP_{52}	—	August 27, 2005	Anderson Mesa	LONEOS	·	1.6 km	MPC · JPL
318688	2005 QC_{59}	—	August 25, 2005	Palomar	NEAT	GEF	1.5 km	MPC · JPL
318689	2005 QC_{62}	—	August 26, 2005	Palomar	NEAT	AGN	1.3 km	MPC · JPL
318690	2005 QV_{62}	—	August 26, 2005	Palomar	NEAT	·	460 m	MPC · JPL
318691	2005 QV_{63}	—	August 26, 2005	Palomar	NEAT	·	3.4 km	MPC · JPL
318692	2005 QG_{74}	—	August 29, 2005	Anderson Mesa	LONEOS	·	2.9 km	MPC · JPL
318693	2005 QQ_{74}	—	August 29, 2005	Anderson Mesa	LONEOS	·	2.2 km	MPC · JPL
318694 Keszthelyi	2005 QM_{75}	Keszthelyi	August 29, 2005	Piszkéstető	K. Sárneczky, Kuli, Z.	·	1.7 km	MPC · JPL
318695	2005 QH_{76}	—	August 29, 2005	Socorro	LINEAR	BAR	1.9 km	MPC · JPL
318696	2005 QK_{80}	—	August 28, 2005	Kitt Peak	Spacewatch	·	1.9 km	MPC · JPL
318697	2005 QY_{84}	—	August 30, 2005	Socorro	LINEAR	·	3.0 km	MPC · JPL
318698 Barthalajos	2005 QK_{87}	Barthalajos	August 30, 2005	Piszkéstető	K. Sárneczky	·	1.8 km	MPC · JPL
318699	2005 QN_{92}	—	August 26, 2005	Palomar	NEAT	·	1.7 km	MPC · JPL
318700	2005 QU_{101}	—	August 27, 2005	Palomar	NEAT	·	2.8 km	MPC · JPL

== 318701–318800 ==
back to top

Designation			Discovery			Properties		Ref
Permanent	Provisional	Named after	Date	Site	Discoverer(s)	Category	Diam.	Ref
318701	2005 QS_{102}	—	August 27, 2005	Palomar	NEAT	MAR	1.5 km	MPC · JPL
318702	2005 QY_{102}	—	August 27, 2005	Palomar	NEAT	·	1.7 km	MPC · JPL
318703	2005 QK_{104}	—	July 31, 2005	Palomar	NEAT	·	1.9 km	MPC · JPL
318704	2005 QS_{107}	—	August 27, 2005	Palomar	NEAT	·	2.0 km	MPC · JPL
318705	2005 QF_{113}	—	August 27, 2005	Palomar	NEAT	·	2.3 km	MPC · JPL
318706	2005 QX_{113}	—	August 27, 2005	Palomar	NEAT	(18466)	3.1 km	MPC · JPL
318707	2005 QD_{114}	—	August 27, 2005	Palomar	NEAT	·	1.0 km	MPC · JPL
318708	2005 QM_{118}	—	August 28, 2005	Kitt Peak	Spacewatch	·	1.1 km	MPC · JPL
318709	2005 QD_{119}	—	August 28, 2005	Kitt Peak	Spacewatch	CYB	3.7 km	MPC · JPL
318710	2005 QQ_{133}	—	August 28, 2005	Kitt Peak	Spacewatch	·	1.7 km	MPC · JPL
318711	2005 QA_{143}	—	August 31, 2005	Anderson Mesa	LONEOS	ADE	2.6 km	MPC · JPL
318712	2005 QW_{151}	—	August 29, 2005	Anderson Mesa	LONEOS	DOR	3.8 km	MPC · JPL
318713	2005 QV_{168}	—	August 29, 2005	Palomar	NEAT	ADE	2.8 km	MPC · JPL
318714	2005 QP_{176}	—	August 26, 2005	Palomar	NEAT	·	2.5 km	MPC · JPL
318715	2005 QE_{177}	—	August 26, 2005	Palomar	NEAT	·	2.3 km	MPC · JPL
318716	2005 QP_{177}	—	August 29, 2005	Palomar	NEAT	·	3.7 km	MPC · JPL
318717	2005 QP_{178}	—	August 28, 2005	Kitt Peak	Spacewatch	·	2.4 km	MPC · JPL
318718	2005 QM_{179}	—	August 25, 2005	Campo Imperatore	CINEOS	·	1.8 km	MPC · JPL
318719	2005 QC_{180}	—	August 27, 2005	Anderson Mesa	LONEOS	·	5.4 km	MPC · JPL
318720	2005 QH_{183}	—	August 31, 2005	Palomar	NEAT	EUN	1.6 km	MPC · JPL
318721	2005 QL_{188}	—	August 31, 2005	Kitt Peak	Spacewatch	KOR	1.2 km	MPC · JPL
318722	2005 RE_{3}	—	September 1, 2005	Haleakala	NEAT	·	2.3 km	MPC · JPL
318723 Bialas	2005 RN_{6}	Bialas	September 8, 2005	Linz	E. Meyer	·	2.0 km	MPC · JPL
318724	2005 RT_{8}	—	September 8, 2005	Socorro	LINEAR	GEF	1.7 km	MPC · JPL
318725	2005 RC_{11}	—	September 10, 2005	Anderson Mesa	LONEOS	H	760 m	MPC · JPL
318726	2005 RR_{15}	—	September 1, 2005	Kitt Peak	Spacewatch	·	1.4 km	MPC · JPL
318727	2005 RU_{18}	—	September 1, 2005	Kitt Peak	Spacewatch	·	1.6 km	MPC · JPL
318728	2005 RC_{20}	—	September 1, 2005	Kitt Peak	Spacewatch	·	1.7 km	MPC · JPL
318729	2005 RV_{22}	—	August 29, 2005	Kitt Peak	Spacewatch	·	2.3 km	MPC · JPL
318730	2005 RK_{25}	—	September 10, 2005	Anderson Mesa	LONEOS	GEF	1.8 km	MPC · JPL
318731	2005 RH_{27}	—	September 10, 2005	Anderson Mesa	LONEOS	·	2.7 km	MPC · JPL
318732	2005 RX_{28}	—	September 12, 2005	Haleakala	NEAT	·	3.5 km	MPC · JPL
318733	2005 RC_{29}	—	September 12, 2005	Haleakala	NEAT	·	780 m	MPC · JPL
318734	2005 RW_{39}	—	September 12, 2005	Socorro	LINEAR	·	2.2 km	MPC · JPL
318735	2005 RE_{44}	—	September 2, 2005	Palomar	NEAT	H	670 m	MPC · JPL
318736	2005 RW_{47}	—	September 13, 2005	Apache Point	A. C. Becker	·	2.9 km	MPC · JPL
318737	2005 SV_{2}	—	September 23, 2005	Catalina	CSS	MAS	990 m	MPC · JPL
318738	2005 SC_{4}	—	September 24, 2005	Kitt Peak	Spacewatch	EUN	1.3 km	MPC · JPL
318739	2005 SM_{6}	—	September 23, 2005	Kitt Peak	Spacewatch	·	1.7 km	MPC · JPL
318740	2005 SA_{7}	—	September 24, 2005	Anderson Mesa	LONEOS	·	1.9 km	MPC · JPL
318741	2005 SE_{7}	—	September 24, 2005	Kitt Peak	Spacewatch	·	1.3 km	MPC · JPL
318742	2005 SL_{8}	—	September 25, 2005	Catalina	CSS	GEF	1.8 km	MPC · JPL
318743	2005 SV_{10}	—	September 23, 2005	Kitt Peak	Spacewatch	·	2.2 km	MPC · JPL
318744	2005 SC_{11}	—	August 29, 2005	Anderson Mesa	LONEOS	·	2.3 km	MPC · JPL
318745	2005 SJ_{11}	—	September 23, 2005	Kitt Peak	Spacewatch	AST	1.9 km	MPC · JPL
318746	2005 SC_{16}	—	September 26, 2005	Kitt Peak	Spacewatch	·	2.0 km	MPC · JPL
318747	2005 SM_{21}	—	September 27, 2005	Kitt Peak	Spacewatch	·	2.7 km	MPC · JPL
318748	2005 SE_{24}	—	September 24, 2005	Anderson Mesa	LONEOS	·	2.4 km	MPC · JPL
318749	2005 SK_{32}	—	September 23, 2005	Kitt Peak	Spacewatch	·	1.3 km	MPC · JPL
318750	2005 SA_{33}	—	September 23, 2005	Kitt Peak	Spacewatch	·	2.7 km	MPC · JPL
318751	2005 SS_{35}	—	September 23, 2005	Kitt Peak	Spacewatch	·	1.7 km	MPC · JPL
318752	2005 SG_{36}	—	September 24, 2005	Kitt Peak	Spacewatch	·	2.4 km	MPC · JPL
318753	2005 ST_{37}	—	September 24, 2005	Kitt Peak	Spacewatch	(2076)	830 m	MPC · JPL
318754	2005 SK_{38}	—	September 24, 2005	Kitt Peak	Spacewatch	HOF	2.5 km	MPC · JPL
318755	2005 SX_{38}	—	September 24, 2005	Kitt Peak	Spacewatch	·	2.0 km	MPC · JPL
318756	2005 SC_{41}	—	September 24, 2005	Kitt Peak	Spacewatch	AST	1.9 km	MPC · JPL
318757	2005 SN_{41}	—	September 24, 2005	Kitt Peak	Spacewatch	·	2.0 km	MPC · JPL
318758	2005 ST_{43}	—	September 24, 2005	Kitt Peak	Spacewatch	·	2.4 km	MPC · JPL
318759	2005 SA_{46}	—	September 24, 2005	Kitt Peak	Spacewatch	·	2.0 km	MPC · JPL
318760	2005 SA_{47}	—	September 24, 2005	Kitt Peak	Spacewatch	·	1.2 km	MPC · JPL
318761	2005 ST_{47}	—	September 24, 2005	Kitt Peak	Spacewatch	AGN	1.2 km	MPC · JPL
318762	2005 SZ_{48}	—	September 24, 2005	Kitt Peak	Spacewatch	·	2.1 km	MPC · JPL
318763	2005 SE_{55}	—	September 25, 2005	Kitt Peak	Spacewatch	·	3.1 km	MPC · JPL
318764	2005 SY_{60}	—	September 26, 2005	Kitt Peak	Spacewatch	·	1.3 km	MPC · JPL
318765	2005 SP_{62}	—	September 26, 2005	Kitt Peak	Spacewatch	·	1.9 km	MPC · JPL
318766	2005 SU_{62}	—	September 26, 2005	Kitt Peak	Spacewatch	HOF	2.8 km	MPC · JPL
318767	2005 SK_{72}	—	September 23, 2005	Catalina	CSS	·	990 m	MPC · JPL
318768	2005 SQ_{72}	—	September 23, 2005	Anderson Mesa	LONEOS	·	1.6 km	MPC · JPL
318769	2005 SV_{74}	—	September 24, 2005	Kitt Peak	Spacewatch	·	2.1 km	MPC · JPL
318770	2005 SL_{75}	—	September 24, 2005	Kitt Peak	Spacewatch	·	1.9 km	MPC · JPL
318771	2005 SM_{76}	—	September 24, 2005	Kitt Peak	Spacewatch	·	1.7 km	MPC · JPL
318772	2005 SO_{78}	—	September 24, 2005	Kitt Peak	Spacewatch	DOR	2.6 km	MPC · JPL
318773	2005 SW_{85}	—	September 24, 2005	Kitt Peak	Spacewatch	·	2.4 km	MPC · JPL
318774	2005 SW_{87}	—	September 24, 2005	Kitt Peak	Spacewatch	·	1.6 km	MPC · JPL
318775	2005 SF_{90}	—	September 24, 2005	Kitt Peak	Spacewatch	(12739)	2.1 km	MPC · JPL
318776	2005 SC_{92}	—	September 24, 2005	Kitt Peak	Spacewatch	H	750 m	MPC · JPL
318777	2005 SS_{92}	—	September 24, 2005	Kitt Peak	Spacewatch	·	1.3 km	MPC · JPL
318778	2005 SC_{93}	—	September 24, 2005	Kitt Peak	Spacewatch	·	1.9 km	MPC · JPL
318779	2005 SR_{98}	—	September 25, 2005	Kitt Peak	Spacewatch	·	2.0 km	MPC · JPL
318780	2005 SL_{100}	—	September 25, 2005	Kitt Peak	Spacewatch	·	860 m	MPC · JPL
318781	2005 SC_{101}	—	September 25, 2005	Kitt Peak	Spacewatch	·	1.6 km	MPC · JPL
318782	2005 SG_{101}	—	September 25, 2005	Kitt Peak	Spacewatch	·	2.1 km	MPC · JPL
318783	2005 SP_{101}	—	September 25, 2005	Kitt Peak	Spacewatch	·	2.2 km	MPC · JPL
318784	2005 SJ_{103}	—	September 25, 2005	Palomar	NEAT	NYS	1.4 km	MPC · JPL
318785	2005 SS_{108}	—	September 26, 2005	Kitt Peak	Spacewatch	·	2.4 km	MPC · JPL
318786	2005 SU_{116}	—	September 28, 2005	Palomar	NEAT	H	540 m	MPC · JPL
318787	2005 SX_{117}	—	September 28, 2005	Palomar	NEAT	EOS	2.3 km	MPC · JPL
318788	2005 SS_{118}	—	September 28, 2005	Palomar	NEAT	BRA	1.8 km	MPC · JPL
318789	2005 SH_{125}	—	September 29, 2005	Mount Lemmon	Mount Lemmon Survey	·	1.7 km	MPC · JPL
318790	2005 SJ_{126}	—	September 29, 2005	Mount Lemmon	Mount Lemmon Survey	NEM	2.3 km	MPC · JPL
318791	2005 SB_{127}	—	September 29, 2005	Mount Lemmon	Mount Lemmon Survey	·	2.2 km	MPC · JPL
318792	2005 SO_{128}	—	September 29, 2005	Mount Lemmon	Mount Lemmon Survey	NEM	3.2 km	MPC · JPL
318793	2005 SF_{130}	—	September 29, 2005	Anderson Mesa	LONEOS	·	2.1 km	MPC · JPL
318794 Uglia	2005 SL_{134}	Uglia	September 25, 2005	Andrushivka	Andrushivka	·	3.0 km	MPC · JPL
318795	2005 SM_{136}	—	September 24, 2005	Kitt Peak	Spacewatch	·	1.4 km	MPC · JPL
318796	2005 SZ_{136}	—	September 24, 2005	Kitt Peak	Spacewatch	·	1.6 km	MPC · JPL
318797	2005 SQ_{137}	—	September 24, 2005	Kitt Peak	Spacewatch	·	1.8 km	MPC · JPL
318798	2005 SZ_{141}	—	September 25, 2005	Kitt Peak	Spacewatch	·	1.5 km	MPC · JPL
318799	2005 SA_{142}	—	September 25, 2005	Kitt Peak	Spacewatch	·	2.3 km	MPC · JPL
318800	2005 SJ_{144}	—	September 25, 2005	Kitt Peak	Spacewatch	KOR	1.2 km	MPC · JPL

== 318801–318900 ==
back to top

Designation			Discovery			Properties		Ref
Permanent	Provisional	Named after	Date	Site	Discoverer(s)	Category	Diam.	Ref
318801	2005 SH_{147}	—	September 25, 2005	Kitt Peak	Spacewatch	THM	2.2 km	MPC · JPL
318802	2005 SN_{151}	—	September 25, 2005	Kitt Peak	Spacewatch	MAS	900 m	MPC · JPL
318803	2005 SC_{155}	—	September 26, 2005	Kitt Peak	Spacewatch	(17392)	1.6 km	MPC · JPL
318804	2005 SL_{156}	—	September 26, 2005	Kitt Peak	Spacewatch	NEM	2.1 km	MPC · JPL
318805	2005 SH_{158}	—	September 26, 2005	Kitt Peak	Spacewatch	WIT	1.5 km	MPC · JPL
318806	2005 SJ_{162}	—	September 27, 2005	Kitt Peak	Spacewatch	·	1.9 km	MPC · JPL
318807	2005 SF_{165}	—	September 28, 2005	Palomar	NEAT	·	2.2 km	MPC · JPL
318808	2005 SH_{166}	—	September 28, 2005	Palomar	NEAT	EUN	1.7 km	MPC · JPL
318809	2005 SV_{166}	—	September 28, 2005	Palomar	NEAT	H	780 m	MPC · JPL
318810	2005 SG_{170}	—	September 29, 2005	Kitt Peak	Spacewatch	·	2.3 km	MPC · JPL
318811	2005 SQ_{170}	—	September 29, 2005	Kitt Peak	Spacewatch	·	2.2 km	MPC · JPL
318812	2005 SD_{173}	—	September 29, 2005	Kitt Peak	Spacewatch	WIT	1.2 km	MPC · JPL
318813	2005 SO_{173}	—	September 29, 2005	Kitt Peak	Spacewatch	·	1.9 km	MPC · JPL
318814	2005 SS_{174}	—	September 29, 2005	Kitt Peak	Spacewatch	·	2.3 km	MPC · JPL
318815	2005 SE_{177}	—	September 29, 2005	Kitt Peak	Spacewatch	·	4.8 km	MPC · JPL
318816	2005 SR_{181}	—	September 29, 2005	Kitt Peak	Spacewatch	·	2.1 km	MPC · JPL
318817	2005 SX_{188}	—	September 29, 2005	Mount Lemmon	Mount Lemmon Survey	·	2.4 km	MPC · JPL
318818	2005 SE_{191}	—	September 29, 2005	Palomar	NEAT	H	780 m	MPC · JPL
318819	2005 SH_{193}	—	September 29, 2005	Kitt Peak	Spacewatch	·	4.1 km	MPC · JPL
318820	2005 SW_{195}	—	September 30, 2005	Kitt Peak	Spacewatch	·	2.1 km	MPC · JPL
318821	2005 SA_{203}	—	September 30, 2005	Palomar	NEAT	·	2.6 km	MPC · JPL
318822	2005 SM_{205}	—	September 30, 2005	Palomar	NEAT	·	2.2 km	MPC · JPL
318823	2005 SR_{211}	—	September 30, 2005	Mount Lemmon	Mount Lemmon Survey	·	1.3 km	MPC · JPL
318824	2005 SO_{213}	—	September 30, 2005	Kitt Peak	Spacewatch	·	1.9 km	MPC · JPL
318825	2005 SB_{215}	—	September 30, 2005	Catalina	CSS	·	3.0 km	MPC · JPL
318826	2005 SB_{218}	—	September 30, 2005	Palomar	NEAT	·	1.4 km	MPC · JPL
318827	2005 SK_{220}	—	September 29, 2005	Catalina	CSS	EUN	2.0 km	MPC · JPL
318828	2005 SP_{227}	—	September 30, 2005	Kitt Peak	Spacewatch	·	1.5 km	MPC · JPL
318829	2005 SV_{232}	—	September 30, 2005	Mount Lemmon	Mount Lemmon Survey	AEO	1.5 km	MPC · JPL
318830	2005 SU_{233}	—	September 30, 2005	Mount Lemmon	Mount Lemmon Survey	AST	2.0 km	MPC · JPL
318831	2005 SK_{240}	—	September 30, 2005	Kitt Peak	Spacewatch	·	2.1 km	MPC · JPL
318832	2005 SO_{240}	—	September 25, 2005	Kitt Peak	Spacewatch	·	2.6 km	MPC · JPL
318833	2005 SP_{247}	—	September 30, 2005	Kitt Peak	Spacewatch	AGN	1.5 km	MPC · JPL
318834	2005 SK_{249}	—	September 30, 2005	Mount Lemmon	Mount Lemmon Survey	KOR	1.1 km	MPC · JPL
318835	2005 SO_{253}	—	September 23, 2005	Palomar	NEAT	·	1.3 km	MPC · JPL
318836	2005 SD_{257}	—	September 22, 2005	Palomar	NEAT	·	2.5 km	MPC · JPL
318837	2005 SQ_{260}	—	September 23, 2005	Kitt Peak	Spacewatch	·	1.9 km	MPC · JPL
318838	2005 SJ_{261}	—	September 27, 2005	Palomar	NEAT	·	3.0 km	MPC · JPL
318839	2005 ST_{262}	—	September 23, 2005	Kitt Peak	Spacewatch	V	740 m	MPC · JPL
318840	2005 SW_{266}	—	September 29, 2005	Anderson Mesa	LONEOS	·	2.4 km	MPC · JPL
318841	2005 SZ_{266}	—	September 29, 2005	Mount Lemmon	Mount Lemmon Survey	·	1.5 km	MPC · JPL
318842	2005 SX_{269}	—	September 29, 2005	Palomar	NEAT	·	2.8 km	MPC · JPL
318843	2005 SV_{273}	—	September 27, 2005	Kitt Peak	Spacewatch	·	2.5 km	MPC · JPL
318844	2005 SG_{277}	—	March 26, 2003	Palomar	NEAT	·	2.6 km	MPC · JPL
318845	2005 SQ_{283}	—	September 21, 2005	Apache Point	A. C. Becker	·	1.6 km	MPC · JPL
318846	2005 SZ_{291}	—	September 27, 2005	Kitt Peak	Spacewatch	HOF	2.8 km	MPC · JPL
318847	2005 TZ_{2}	—	October 1, 2005	Catalina	CSS	·	2.4 km	MPC · JPL
318848	2005 TK_{5}	—	October 1, 2005	Catalina	CSS	ADE	2.9 km	MPC · JPL
318849	2005 TG_{11}	—	October 1, 2005	Kitt Peak	Spacewatch	HNS	1.4 km	MPC · JPL
318850	2005 TJ_{15}	—	October 1, 2005	Anderson Mesa	LONEOS	H	720 m	MPC · JPL
318851	2005 TX_{16}	—	October 1, 2005	Anderson Mesa	LONEOS	·	2.1 km	MPC · JPL
318852	2005 TU_{17}	—	October 1, 2005	Mount Lemmon	Mount Lemmon Survey	·	1.7 km	MPC · JPL
318853	2005 TS_{31}	—	October 1, 2005	Kitt Peak	Spacewatch	·	1.6 km	MPC · JPL
318854	2005 TV_{36}	—	October 1, 2005	Kitt Peak	Spacewatch	·	2.1 km	MPC · JPL
318855	2005 TS_{39}	—	October 1, 2005	Kitt Peak	Spacewatch	EUN	1.6 km	MPC · JPL
318856	2005 TQ_{41}	—	September 2, 2000	Kitt Peak	Spacewatch	·	2.6 km	MPC · JPL
318857	2005 TX_{41}	—	October 3, 2005	Socorro	LINEAR	·	4.5 km	MPC · JPL
318858	2005 TH_{51}	—	October 13, 2005	Mount Lemmon	Mount Lemmon Survey	H	560 m	MPC · JPL
318859	2005 TX_{54}	—	October 4, 2005	Mount Lemmon	Mount Lemmon Survey	·	2.6 km	MPC · JPL
318860	2005 TO_{56}	—	October 1, 2005	Mount Lemmon	Mount Lemmon Survey	KOR	1.2 km	MPC · JPL
318861	2005 TJ_{57}	—	October 1, 2005	Mount Lemmon	Mount Lemmon Survey	·	2.3 km	MPC · JPL
318862	2005 TD_{60}	—	October 3, 2005	Kitt Peak	Spacewatch	·	2.2 km	MPC · JPL
318863	2005 TR_{61}	—	September 24, 2005	Kitt Peak	Spacewatch	·	2.6 km	MPC · JPL
318864	2005 TC_{63}	—	October 4, 2005	Mount Lemmon	Mount Lemmon Survey	KOR	1.3 km	MPC · JPL
318865	2005 TC_{71}	—	October 6, 2005	Mount Lemmon	Mount Lemmon Survey	·	2.3 km	MPC · JPL
318866	2005 TO_{73}	—	October 6, 2005	Catalina	CSS	·	4.5 km	MPC · JPL
318867	2005 TP_{76}	—	October 5, 2005	Catalina	CSS	·	1.9 km	MPC · JPL
318868	2005 TY_{79}	—	October 2, 2005	Palomar	NEAT	(883)	950 m	MPC · JPL
318869	2005 TF_{81}	—	October 3, 2005	Kitt Peak	Spacewatch	·	2.2 km	MPC · JPL
318870	2005 TX_{81}	—	October 3, 2005	Kitt Peak	Spacewatch	·	1.9 km	MPC · JPL
318871	2005 TV_{84}	—	October 3, 2005	Kitt Peak	Spacewatch	·	3.0 km	MPC · JPL
318872	2005 TZ_{88}	—	October 5, 2005	Mount Lemmon	Mount Lemmon Survey	·	1.5 km	MPC · JPL
318873	2005 TH_{91}	—	October 6, 2005	Mount Lemmon	Mount Lemmon Survey	AST	1.7 km	MPC · JPL
318874	2005 TT_{97}	—	October 6, 2005	Mount Lemmon	Mount Lemmon Survey	·	2.6 km	MPC · JPL
318875	2005 TS_{100}	—	October 7, 2005	Kitt Peak	Spacewatch	T_{j} (2.95)	8.7 km	MPC · JPL
318876	2005 TO_{102}	—	October 7, 2005	Mount Lemmon	Mount Lemmon Survey	AGN	1.3 km	MPC · JPL
318877	2005 TP_{104}	—	October 8, 2005	Catalina	CSS	·	2.5 km	MPC · JPL
318878	2005 TX_{109}	—	October 7, 2005	Kitt Peak	Spacewatch	·	1.5 km	MPC · JPL
318879	2005 TW_{113}	—	October 7, 2005	Kitt Peak	Spacewatch	·	1.5 km	MPC · JPL
318880	2005 TG_{114}	—	October 7, 2005	Kitt Peak	Spacewatch	·	1.9 km	MPC · JPL
318881	2005 TZ_{114}	—	October 7, 2005	Kitt Peak	Spacewatch	·	2.1 km	MPC · JPL
318882	2005 TZ_{118}	—	October 7, 2005	Kitt Peak	Spacewatch	·	2.0 km	MPC · JPL
318883	2005 TJ_{123}	—	September 26, 2005	Kitt Peak	Spacewatch	·	2.0 km	MPC · JPL
318884	2005 TA_{126}	—	October 7, 2005	Kitt Peak	Spacewatch	KOR	1.3 km	MPC · JPL
318885	2005 TB_{127}	—	October 7, 2005	Kitt Peak	Spacewatch	·	1.7 km	MPC · JPL
318886	2005 TG_{128}	—	October 7, 2005	Kitt Peak	Spacewatch	·	1.8 km	MPC · JPL
318887	2005 TP_{135}	—	October 6, 2005	Kitt Peak	Spacewatch	·	1.8 km	MPC · JPL
318888	2005 TB_{140}	—	October 8, 2005	Kitt Peak	Spacewatch	·	2.0 km	MPC · JPL
318889	2005 TK_{145}	—	October 8, 2005	Kitt Peak	Spacewatch	EUN	1.2 km	MPC · JPL
318890	2005 TX_{154}	—	October 9, 2005	Kitt Peak	Spacewatch	·	1.7 km	MPC · JPL
318891	2005 TK_{163}	—	October 9, 2005	Kitt Peak	Spacewatch	·	1.9 km	MPC · JPL
318892	2005 TP_{163}	—	October 9, 2005	Kitt Peak	Spacewatch	HOF	3.1 km	MPC · JPL
318893	2005 TK_{164}	—	October 9, 2005	Kitt Peak	Spacewatch	·	2.4 km	MPC · JPL
318894	2005 TJ_{168}	—	October 9, 2005	Kitt Peak	Spacewatch	·	2.7 km	MPC · JPL
318895	2005 TK_{176}	—	October 1, 2005	Mount Lemmon	Mount Lemmon Survey	·	2.2 km	MPC · JPL
318896	2005 TM_{176}	—	October 1, 2005	Mount Lemmon	Mount Lemmon Survey	·	2.6 km	MPC · JPL
318897	2005 TA_{177}	—	October 1, 2005	Anderson Mesa	LONEOS	·	2.5 km	MPC · JPL
318898	2005 TB_{178}	—	October 1, 2005	Catalina	CSS	·	1.1 km	MPC · JPL
318899	2005 TE_{186}	—	October 7, 2005	Kitt Peak	Spacewatch	·	1.8 km	MPC · JPL
318900	2005 TR_{186}	—	September 24, 2005	Kitt Peak	Spacewatch	·	2.1 km	MPC · JPL

== 318901–319000 ==
back to top

Designation			Discovery			Properties		Ref
Permanent	Provisional	Named after	Date	Site	Discoverer(s)	Category	Diam.	Ref
318901	2005 TN_{190}	—	October 10, 2005	Catalina	CSS	·	2.5 km	MPC · JPL
318902	2005 UR_{5}	—	October 25, 2005	Socorro	LINEAR	·	1.7 km	MPC · JPL
318903	2005 UQ_{8}	—	October 27, 2005	Ottmarsheim	C. Rinner	NYS	1.4 km	MPC · JPL
318904	2005 UF_{9}	—	October 21, 2005	Palomar	NEAT	·	1.7 km	MPC · JPL
318905	2005 UO_{18}	—	October 22, 2005	Kitt Peak	Spacewatch	·	2.3 km	MPC · JPL
318906	2005 UT_{21}	—	October 23, 2005	Kitt Peak	Spacewatch	·	2.6 km	MPC · JPL
318907	2005 UC_{24}	—	October 23, 2005	Kitt Peak	Spacewatch	·	2.1 km	MPC · JPL
318908	2005 UK_{24}	—	October 23, 2005	Kitt Peak	Spacewatch	·	840 m	MPC · JPL
318909	2005 UC_{32}	—	October 24, 2005	Kitt Peak	Spacewatch	·	1.3 km	MPC · JPL
318910	2005 US_{40}	—	October 24, 2005	Kitt Peak	Spacewatch	·	2.7 km	MPC · JPL
318911	2005 UE_{43}	—	October 22, 2005	Kitt Peak	Spacewatch	·	2.3 km	MPC · JPL
318912	2005 US_{45}	—	October 22, 2005	Catalina	CSS	MAR	1.5 km	MPC · JPL
318913	2005 UB_{46}	—	October 22, 2005	Catalina	CSS	WIT	1.5 km	MPC · JPL
318914	2005 UV_{46}	—	October 22, 2005	Kitt Peak	Spacewatch	KOR	1.7 km	MPC · JPL
318915	2005 UY_{49}	—	October 23, 2005	Catalina	CSS	HOF	3.7 km	MPC · JPL
318916	2005 UM_{57}	—	October 24, 2005	Anderson Mesa	LONEOS	AGN	1.5 km	MPC · JPL
318917	2005 UQ_{58}	—	October 24, 2005	Kitt Peak	Spacewatch	·	2.4 km	MPC · JPL
318918	2005 UH_{60}	—	October 25, 2005	Anderson Mesa	LONEOS	·	2.4 km	MPC · JPL
318919	2005 UC_{62}	—	October 25, 2005	Mount Lemmon	Mount Lemmon Survey	·	2.2 km	MPC · JPL
318920	2005 UC_{70}	—	October 23, 2005	Catalina	CSS	EUN	1.5 km	MPC · JPL
318921	2005 UM_{73}	—	October 23, 2005	Palomar	NEAT	·	2.0 km	MPC · JPL
318922	2005 UP_{77}	—	October 24, 2005	Palomar	NEAT	·	1.2 km	MPC · JPL
318923	2005 UT_{79}	—	October 25, 2005	Mount Lemmon	Mount Lemmon Survey	AST	1.8 km	MPC · JPL
318924	2005 UV_{86}	—	October 22, 2005	Kitt Peak	Spacewatch	·	1.1 km	MPC · JPL
318925	2005 UF_{91}	—	October 22, 2005	Kitt Peak	Spacewatch	PAD	2.2 km	MPC · JPL
318926	2005 UY_{91}	—	October 22, 2005	Kitt Peak	Spacewatch	HIL · 3:2 · (6124)	7.4 km	MPC · JPL
318927	2005 UB_{92}	—	October 22, 2005	Kitt Peak	Spacewatch	·	2.4 km	MPC · JPL
318928	2005 UJ_{94}	—	October 22, 2005	Kitt Peak	Spacewatch	GEF	1.7 km	MPC · JPL
318929	2005 UB_{95}	—	October 22, 2005	Kitt Peak	Spacewatch	·	2.3 km	MPC · JPL
318930	2005 UC_{104}	—	October 22, 2005	Kitt Peak	Spacewatch	·	2.3 km	MPC · JPL
318931	2005 UP_{104}	—	October 22, 2005	Kitt Peak	Spacewatch	·	1.7 km	MPC · JPL
318932	2005 UB_{105}	—	October 22, 2005	Kitt Peak	Spacewatch	·	1.7 km	MPC · JPL
318933	2005 UH_{107}	—	October 22, 2005	Kitt Peak	Spacewatch	·	2.3 km	MPC · JPL
318934	2005 UT_{111}	—	October 22, 2005	Kitt Peak	Spacewatch	·	1.8 km	MPC · JPL
318935	2005 UH_{123}	—	April 6, 2003	Kitt Peak	Spacewatch	·	2.9 km	MPC · JPL
318936	2005 UQ_{124}	—	October 24, 2005	Kitt Peak	Spacewatch	·	2.0 km	MPC · JPL
318937	2005 UC_{125}	—	October 24, 2005	Kitt Peak	Spacewatch	EOS	1.7 km	MPC · JPL
318938	2005 UR_{132}	—	October 24, 2005	Palomar	NEAT	·	3.5 km	MPC · JPL
318939	2005 UD_{138}	—	October 25, 2005	Mount Lemmon	Mount Lemmon Survey	·	1.3 km	MPC · JPL
318940	2005 UH_{141}	—	October 25, 2005	Catalina	CSS	·	3.0 km	MPC · JPL
318941	2005 UR_{143}	—	October 25, 2005	Kitt Peak	Spacewatch	AST	2.1 km	MPC · JPL
318942	2005 UL_{149}	—	October 26, 2005	Kitt Peak	Spacewatch	·	2.0 km	MPC · JPL
318943	2005 UM_{154}	—	October 26, 2005	Kitt Peak	Spacewatch	·	1.6 km	MPC · JPL
318944	2005 UD_{161}	—	October 22, 2005	Palomar	NEAT	EOS	2.8 km	MPC · JPL
318945	2005 UB_{163}	—	October 23, 2005	Kitt Peak	Spacewatch	·	2.2 km	MPC · JPL
318946	2005 UA_{173}	—	October 24, 2005	Kitt Peak	Spacewatch	KOR	1.4 km	MPC · JPL
318947	2005 UL_{191}	—	October 27, 2005	Mount Lemmon	Mount Lemmon Survey	HOF	2.9 km	MPC · JPL
318948	2005 UD_{195}	—	October 22, 2005	Kitt Peak	Spacewatch	AST	1.9 km	MPC · JPL
318949	2005 UD_{200}	—	October 25, 2005	Kitt Peak	Spacewatch	GEF	1.6 km	MPC · JPL
318950	2005 UY_{213}	—	October 22, 2005	Palomar	NEAT	·	1.4 km	MPC · JPL
318951	2005 UP_{215}	—	October 23, 2005	Catalina	CSS	·	2.4 km	MPC · JPL
318952	2005 UX_{216}	—	October 26, 2005	Kitt Peak	Spacewatch	·	2.6 km	MPC · JPL
318953	2005 UT_{219}	—	October 25, 2005	Kitt Peak	Spacewatch	·	2.2 km	MPC · JPL
318954	2005 UW_{223}	—	October 25, 2005	Kitt Peak	Spacewatch	·	760 m	MPC · JPL
318955	2005 UV_{226}	—	October 25, 2005	Kitt Peak	Spacewatch	·	2.3 km	MPC · JPL
318956	2005 UA_{231}	—	October 25, 2005	Mount Lemmon	Mount Lemmon Survey	HOF	2.9 km	MPC · JPL
318957	2005 UE_{231}	—	October 25, 2005	Mount Lemmon	Mount Lemmon Survey	AST	2.2 km	MPC · JPL
318958	2005 UC_{244}	—	October 25, 2005	Kitt Peak	Spacewatch	·	3.0 km	MPC · JPL
318959	2005 UT_{244}	—	October 25, 2005	Kitt Peak	Spacewatch	·	2.5 km	MPC · JPL
318960	2005 UX_{245}	—	October 27, 2005	Mount Lemmon	Mount Lemmon Survey	HOF	2.4 km	MPC · JPL
318961	2005 UV_{247}	—	October 28, 2005	Mount Lemmon	Mount Lemmon Survey	KOR	1.2 km	MPC · JPL
318962	2005 UB_{249}	—	October 28, 2005	Mount Lemmon	Mount Lemmon Survey	KOR	1.4 km	MPC · JPL
318963	2005 UW_{249}	—	October 28, 2005	Mount Lemmon	Mount Lemmon Survey	·	1.7 km	MPC · JPL
318964	2005 UK_{254}	—	October 22, 2005	Kitt Peak	Spacewatch	AGN	1.6 km	MPC · JPL
318965	2005 UY_{259}	—	October 25, 2005	Kitt Peak	Spacewatch	DOR	2.9 km	MPC · JPL
318966	2005 UR_{275}	—	October 29, 2005	Catalina	CSS	NAE	4.1 km	MPC · JPL
318967	2005 UO_{278}	—	October 24, 2005	Kitt Peak	Spacewatch	·	3.0 km	MPC · JPL
318968	2005 UX_{283}	—	October 26, 2005	Kitt Peak	Spacewatch	·	1.7 km	MPC · JPL
318969	2005 UF_{286}	—	October 26, 2005	Kitt Peak	Spacewatch	·	2.1 km	MPC · JPL
318970	2005 UD_{290}	—	October 26, 2005	Kitt Peak	Spacewatch	·	3.1 km	MPC · JPL
318971	2005 UN_{290}	—	October 26, 2005	Kitt Peak	Spacewatch	·	2.5 km	MPC · JPL
318972	2005 UK_{292}	—	October 26, 2005	Kitt Peak	Spacewatch	·	3.6 km	MPC · JPL
318973	2005 UQ_{293}	—	October 26, 2005	Kitt Peak	Spacewatch	EOS	2.1 km	MPC · JPL
318974	2005 UF_{296}	—	October 26, 2005	Kitt Peak	Spacewatch	·	2.3 km	MPC · JPL
318975	2005 UD_{297}	—	October 26, 2005	Kitt Peak	Spacewatch	KOR	1.3 km	MPC · JPL
318976	2005 UK_{302}	—	October 26, 2005	Kitt Peak	Spacewatch	·	930 m	MPC · JPL
318977	2005 UP_{310}	—	October 29, 2005	Kitt Peak	Spacewatch	KOR	1.2 km	MPC · JPL
318978	2005 UK_{312}	—	October 29, 2005	Catalina	CSS	EUN	2.0 km	MPC · JPL
318979	2005 UB_{319}	—	October 27, 2005	Kitt Peak	Spacewatch	(21344)	1.6 km	MPC · JPL
318980	2005 UJ_{320}	—	October 27, 2005	Mount Lemmon	Mount Lemmon Survey	KOR	1.5 km	MPC · JPL
318981	2005 UA_{324}	—	October 29, 2005	Mount Lemmon	Mount Lemmon Survey	·	1.9 km	MPC · JPL
318982	2005 UX_{337}	—	October 31, 2005	Kitt Peak	Spacewatch	·	2.4 km	MPC · JPL
318983	2005 UF_{345}	—	October 29, 2005	Mount Lemmon	Mount Lemmon Survey	ANF	1.5 km	MPC · JPL
318984	2005 UZ_{353}	—	October 29, 2005	Catalina	CSS	·	780 m	MPC · JPL
318985	2005 UB_{355}	—	October 29, 2005	Catalina	CSS	EUN	2.4 km	MPC · JPL
318986	2005 UR_{365}	—	October 27, 2005	Kitt Peak	Spacewatch	GEF	1.5 km	MPC · JPL
318987	2005 UJ_{372}	—	October 27, 2005	Kitt Peak	Spacewatch	·	1.4 km	MPC · JPL
318988	2005 UC_{378}	—	October 28, 2005	Mount Lemmon	Mount Lemmon Survey	KOR	1.3 km	MPC · JPL
318989	2005 UX_{378}	—	October 2, 2005	Mount Lemmon	Mount Lemmon Survey	KOR	1.3 km	MPC · JPL
318990	2005 UD_{388}	—	October 26, 2005	Kitt Peak	Spacewatch	TEL	1.5 km	MPC · JPL
318991	2005 UT_{389}	—	October 29, 2005	Mount Lemmon	Mount Lemmon Survey	·	1.6 km	MPC · JPL
318992	2005 UD_{395}	—	October 30, 2005	Mount Lemmon	Mount Lemmon Survey	·	2.0 km	MPC · JPL
318993	2005 UU_{399}	—	October 25, 2005	Mount Lemmon	Mount Lemmon Survey	·	2.5 km	MPC · JPL
318994	2005 UP_{406}	—	October 30, 2005	Catalina	CSS	·	1.2 km	MPC · JPL
318995	2005 UX_{413}	—	October 25, 2005	Kitt Peak	Spacewatch	·	2.6 km	MPC · JPL
318996	2005 UU_{414}	—	October 25, 2005	Kitt Peak	Spacewatch	·	1.4 km	MPC · JPL
318997	2005 UA_{417}	—	October 25, 2005	Kitt Peak	Spacewatch	·	2.0 km	MPC · JPL
318998	2005 UN_{419}	—	October 25, 2005	Kitt Peak	Spacewatch	·	2.5 km	MPC · JPL
318999	2005 UB_{421}	—	October 26, 2005	Kitt Peak	Spacewatch	·	1.6 km	MPC · JPL
319000	2005 UV_{429}	—	October 28, 2005	Kitt Peak	Spacewatch	KOR	1.3 km	MPC · JPL

back to top

== See also ==
- Meanings of minor-planet names: 318001–319000
