= Meanings of minor-planet names: 318001–319000 =

As minor planet discoveries are confirmed, they are given a permanent number by the IAU's Minor Planet Center (MPC), and the discoverers can then submit names for them, following the IAU's naming conventions. The list below concerns those minor planets in the specified number-range that have received names, and explains the meanings of those names.

Official naming citations of newly named small Solar System bodies are approved and published in a bulletin by IAU's Working Group for Small Bodies Nomenclature (WGSBN). Before May 2021, citations were published in MPC's Minor Planet Circulars for many decades. Recent citations can also be found on the JPL Small-Body Database (SBDB). Until his death in 2016, German astronomer Lutz D. Schmadel compiled these citations into the Dictionary of Minor Planet Names (DMP) and regularly updated the collection.

Based on Paul Herget's The Names of the Minor Planets, Schmadel also researched the unclear origin of numerous asteroids, most of which had been named prior to World War II. This article incorporates text from this source, which is in the public domain: SBDB New namings may only be added to this list below after official publication as the preannouncement of names is condemned. The WGSBN publishes a comprehensive guideline for the naming rules of non-cometary small Solar System bodies.

== 318001–318100 ==
Named minor planet	Provisional	This minor planet was named for...	Ref · Catalog
There are no named minor planets in this number range

== 318101–318200 ==
back to top

Named minor planet	Provisional	This minor planet was named for...	Ref · Catalog
There are no named minor planets in this number range

== 318201–318300 ==
back to top

Named minor planet	Provisional	This minor planet was named for...	Ref · Catalog
There are no named minor planets in this number range

== 318301–318400 ==
back to top

Named minor planet	Provisional	This minor planet was named for...	Ref · Catalog
There are no named minor planets in this number range

== 318401–318500 ==
back to top

Named minor planet	Provisional	This minor planet was named for...	Ref · Catalog
318412 Tramelan	2005 AB_{27}	Tramelan, a watch-making village situated in the south of the Swiss Franches-Montagnes district.	JPL · 318412

== 318501–318600 ==
back to top

Named minor planet	Provisional	This minor planet was named for...	Ref · Catalog
318547 Fidrich	2005 GV_{8}	Róbert Fidrich (born 1969), a Hungarian amateur astronomer.	JPL · 318547

== 318601–318700 ==
back to top

Named minor planet	Provisional	This minor planet was named for...	Ref · Catalog
318676 Bellelay	2005 PS_{16}	The monastery of Bellelay was founded in 1136 by Siginand. It is the home of the Swiss Jura cheese Tête de Moine, first made by the monks in the 12th century	JPL · 318676
318682 Carpaccio	2005 QO_{30}	Vittore Carpaccio (1465–1525) was a Venetian painter of the Venetian school, who studied under Gentile Bellini. He is best known for a cycle of nine paintings, The Legend of Saint Ursula.	JPL · 318682
318694 Keszthelyi	2005 QM_{75}	Sándor Keszthelyi (born 1952), a Hungarian architect and amateur astronomer.	JPL · 318694
318698 Barthalajos	2005 QK_{87}	Lajos Bartha (born 1933), a Hungarian librarian, amateur astronomer and historian of astronomy.	JPL · 318698

== 318701–318800 ==
back to top

Named minor planet	Provisional	This minor planet was named for...	Ref · Catalog
318723 Bialas	2005 RN_{6}	Volker Bialas (born 1938) received his doctorate in 1968 in Munich on the Rudolphine Tables of Johannes Kepler. From 1985 to 2003 he was Scientific Director of the publication of Kepler's Collected Works at the Bavarian Academy of Sciences. He is a member of the working group Johannes Kepler of the IAU.	JPL · 318723
318794 Uglia	2005 SL_{134}	The Ukrainian Humanities Lyceum (UGL in Ukrainian) was founded in 1991. It is an innovative educational institution in the educational and scientific complex known as Modern Education, led by Kyiv National Taras Shevchenko University, a member of the UNESCO Associated schools.	JPL · 318794

== 318801–318900 ==
back to top

Named minor planet	Provisional	This minor planet was named for...	Ref · Catalog
There are no named minor planets in this number range

== 318901–319000 ==
back to top

Named minor planet	Provisional	This minor planet was named for...	Ref · Catalog
There are no named minor planets in this number range

back to top

Preceded by 317,001–318,000	Meanings of minor-planet names List of minor planets: 318,001–319,000	Succeeded by 319,001–320,000
