= List of minor planets: 317001–318000 =

The following is a partial list of minor planets, running from minor-planet number 317001 through 318000, inclusive. The primary data for this and other partial lists is based on JPL's "Small-Body Orbital Elements" and data available from the Minor Planet Center. Critical list information is also provided by the MPC, unless otherwise specified from Lowell Observatory. A detailed description of the table's columns and additional sources are given on the main page including a complete list of every page in this series, and a statistical break-up on the dynamical classification of minor planets.

Also see the summary list of all named bodies in numerical and alphabetical order, and the corresponding naming citations for the number range of this particular list. New namings may only be added to this list after official publication, as the preannouncement of names is condemned by the Working Group for Small Bodies Nomenclature of the International Astronomical Union.

Near-Earth obj.	MBA (inner)	MBA (outer)	Centaur
Mars-crosser	MBA (middle)	Jupiter trojan	Trans-Neptunian obj.
Unclassified

== 317001–317100 ==
Designation			Discovery			Properties		Ref
Permanent	Provisional	Named after	Date	Site	Discoverer(s)	Category	Diam.	Ref
317001	2001 PP_{34}	—	August 10, 2001	Palomar	NEAT	RAF	1.4 km	MPC · JPL
317002	2001 PV_{38}	—	August 11, 2001	Palomar	NEAT	EUN	1.8 km	MPC · JPL
317003	2001 PN_{57}	—	August 1, 2001	Palomar	NEAT	EUN	1.5 km	MPC · JPL
317004	2001 PV_{60}	—	August 13, 2001	Haleakala	NEAT	·	1.5 km	MPC · JPL
317005	2001 PK_{67}	—	August 11, 2001	Haleakala	NEAT	·	1.9 km	MPC · JPL
317006	2001 QK	—	August 16, 2001	Reedy Creek	J. Broughton	·	3.6 km	MPC · JPL
317007	2001 QM_{21}	—	August 16, 2001	Socorro	LINEAR	·	2.2 km	MPC · JPL
317008	2001 QA_{46}	—	August 16, 2001	Socorro	LINEAR	·	2.3 km	MPC · JPL
317009	2001 QU_{50}	—	August 16, 2001	Socorro	LINEAR	·	1.9 km	MPC · JPL
317010	2001 QV_{92}	—	August 22, 2001	Socorro	LINEAR	·	2.3 km	MPC · JPL
317011	2001 QU_{96}	—	August 16, 2001	Socorro	LINEAR	·	2.5 km	MPC · JPL
317012	2001 QT_{100}	—	August 20, 2001	Palomar	NEAT	·	2.2 km	MPC · JPL
317013	2001 QE_{125}	—	August 19, 2001	Socorro	LINEAR	EUN	1.5 km	MPC · JPL
317014	2001 QY_{129}	—	August 11, 2001	Haleakala	NEAT	EUN	1.6 km	MPC · JPL
317015	2001 QV_{159}	—	August 23, 2001	Anderson Mesa	LONEOS	NYS	1.2 km	MPC · JPL
317016	2001 QN_{164}	—	August 10, 2001	Palomar	NEAT	·	2.1 km	MPC · JPL
317017	2001 QJ_{184}	—	August 21, 2001	Kitt Peak	Spacewatch	·	1.6 km	MPC · JPL
317018	2001 QB_{193}	—	August 22, 2001	Socorro	LINEAR	·	2.0 km	MPC · JPL
317019	2001 QH_{205}	—	August 23, 2001	Socorro	LINEAR	EOS	2.7 km	MPC · JPL
317020	2001 QW_{206}	—	August 23, 2001	Anderson Mesa	LONEOS	·	1.3 km	MPC · JPL
317021	2001 QL_{217}	—	August 23, 2001	Anderson Mesa	LONEOS	MAS	930 m	MPC · JPL
317022	2001 QW_{217}	—	August 17, 2001	Palomar	NEAT	·	1.7 km	MPC · JPL
317023	2001 QD_{221}	—	August 24, 2001	Anderson Mesa	LONEOS	EOS	2.9 km	MPC · JPL
317024	2001 QC_{224}	—	August 24, 2001	Anderson Mesa	LONEOS	JUN	1.2 km	MPC · JPL
317025	2001 QP_{227}	—	August 24, 2001	Anderson Mesa	LONEOS	·	2.0 km	MPC · JPL
317026	2001 QH_{229}	—	August 24, 2001	Anderson Mesa	LONEOS	·	1.6 km	MPC · JPL
317027	2001 QJ_{229}	—	August 24, 2001	Anderson Mesa	LONEOS	EUN	1.2 km	MPC · JPL
317028	2001 QC_{230}	—	August 24, 2001	Desert Eagle	W. K. Y. Yeung	·	1.3 km	MPC · JPL
317029	2001 QM_{245}	—	August 24, 2001	Socorro	LINEAR	EUN	1.8 km	MPC · JPL
317030	2001 QZ_{254}	—	August 25, 2001	Anderson Mesa	LONEOS	CYB	5.4 km	MPC · JPL
317031	2001 QU_{267}	—	August 20, 2001	Palomar	NEAT	·	2.3 km	MPC · JPL
317032	2001 QH_{275}	—	August 19, 2001	Socorro	LINEAR	·	4.1 km	MPC · JPL
317033	2001 QX_{277}	—	August 19, 2001	Socorro	LINEAR	·	1.9 km	MPC · JPL
317034	2001 QF_{330}	—	August 25, 2001	Socorro	LINEAR	·	2.2 km	MPC · JPL
317035	2001 RZ_{7}	—	September 8, 2001	Socorro	LINEAR	·	1.6 km	MPC · JPL
317036	2001 RN_{14}	—	September 10, 2001	Socorro	LINEAR	·	1.9 km	MPC · JPL
317037	2001 RP_{22}	—	September 7, 2001	Socorro	LINEAR	·	1.3 km	MPC · JPL
317038	2001 RF_{55}	—	September 12, 2001	Socorro	LINEAR	·	1.9 km	MPC · JPL
317039	2001 RE_{60}	—	September 12, 2001	Socorro	LINEAR	·	1.7 km	MPC · JPL
317040	2001 RV_{74}	—	September 10, 2001	Socorro	LINEAR	·	5.2 km	MPC · JPL
317041	2001 RX_{74}	—	September 10, 2001	Socorro	LINEAR	·	2.6 km	MPC · JPL
317042	2001 RJ_{91}	—	September 11, 2001	Anderson Mesa	LONEOS	·	3.6 km	MPC · JPL
317043	2001 RL_{113}	—	September 12, 2001	Socorro	LINEAR	·	1.6 km	MPC · JPL
317044	2001 RN_{125}	—	September 12, 2001	Socorro	LINEAR	·	1.9 km	MPC · JPL
317045	2001 RP_{130}	—	September 12, 2001	Socorro	LINEAR	MAS	870 m	MPC · JPL
317046	2001 RA_{138}	—	September 12, 2001	Socorro	LINEAR	·	3.2 km	MPC · JPL
317047	2001 RB_{142}	—	September 12, 2001	Socorro	LINEAR	·	3.4 km	MPC · JPL
317048	2001 SM_{8}	—	September 18, 2001	Kitt Peak	Spacewatch	(11882)	2.0 km	MPC · JPL
317049	2001 SO_{49}	—	September 16, 2001	Socorro	LINEAR	·	2.4 km	MPC · JPL
317050	2001 SF_{51}	—	August 24, 2001	Socorro	LINEAR	·	2.0 km	MPC · JPL
317051	2001 SH_{60}	—	September 17, 2001	Socorro	LINEAR	HIL · 3:2	7.3 km	MPC · JPL
317052	2001 SF_{61}	—	September 17, 2001	Socorro	LINEAR	·	1.3 km	MPC · JPL
317053	2001 SV_{84}	—	September 20, 2001	Socorro	LINEAR	EUN	1.4 km	MPC · JPL
317054	2001 SZ_{89}	—	September 20, 2001	Socorro	LINEAR	·	1.4 km	MPC · JPL
317055	2001 SC_{91}	—	September 20, 2001	Socorro	LINEAR	·	2.5 km	MPC · JPL
317056	2001 SL_{92}	—	September 20, 2001	Socorro	LINEAR	·	1.3 km	MPC · JPL
317057	2001 SE_{100}	—	September 20, 2001	Socorro	LINEAR	·	1.9 km	MPC · JPL
317058	2001 SM_{100}	—	September 20, 2001	Socorro	LINEAR	KON	2.1 km	MPC · JPL
317059	2001 SM_{102}	—	September 20, 2001	Socorro	LINEAR	·	960 m	MPC · JPL
317060	2001 SP_{104}	—	September 20, 2001	Socorro	LINEAR	EUN	1.7 km	MPC · JPL
317061	2001 SK_{117}	—	September 16, 2001	Socorro	LINEAR	EOS	2.7 km	MPC · JPL
317062	2001 SM_{119}	—	September 16, 2001	Socorro	LINEAR	·	1.5 km	MPC · JPL
317063	2001 SO_{128}	—	September 16, 2001	Socorro	LINEAR	GEF	1.4 km	MPC · JPL
317064	2001 SW_{139}	—	September 16, 2001	Socorro	LINEAR	NYS	1.3 km	MPC · JPL
317065	2001 ST_{141}	—	September 16, 2001	Socorro	LINEAR	·	1.5 km	MPC · JPL
317066	2001 SL_{180}	—	September 19, 2001	Socorro	LINEAR	·	1.3 km	MPC · JPL
317067	2001 SO_{202}	—	September 19, 2001	Socorro	LINEAR	NYS	1.2 km	MPC · JPL
317068	2001 SY_{205}	—	September 19, 2001	Socorro	LINEAR	·	2.2 km	MPC · JPL
317069	2001 SB_{206}	—	September 19, 2001	Socorro	LINEAR	·	1.9 km	MPC · JPL
317070	2001 SM_{206}	—	September 19, 2001	Socorro	LINEAR	·	3.3 km	MPC · JPL
317071	2001 SP_{206}	—	September 19, 2001	Socorro	LINEAR	·	1.5 km	MPC · JPL
317072	2001 SR_{207}	—	September 19, 2001	Socorro	LINEAR	EOS	2.5 km	MPC · JPL
317073	2001 SM_{209}	—	September 19, 2001	Socorro	LINEAR	·	1.7 km	MPC · JPL
317074	2001 SS_{219}	—	September 19, 2001	Socorro	LINEAR	·	1.9 km	MPC · JPL
317075	2001 SY_{219}	—	September 19, 2001	Socorro	LINEAR	·	1.6 km	MPC · JPL
317076	2001 SG_{228}	—	September 19, 2001	Socorro	LINEAR	·	1.6 km	MPC · JPL
317077	2001 SU_{237}	—	September 19, 2001	Socorro	LINEAR	·	2.1 km	MPC · JPL
317078	2001 SE_{253}	—	September 19, 2001	Socorro	LINEAR	L5	13 km	MPC · JPL
317079	2001 SU_{255}	—	September 19, 2001	Socorro	LINEAR	·	2.5 km	MPC · JPL
317080	2001 SZ_{258}	—	September 20, 2001	Socorro	LINEAR	·	1.2 km	MPC · JPL
317081	2001 SD_{278}	—	September 21, 2001	Anderson Mesa	LONEOS	·	3.4 km	MPC · JPL
317082	2001 SQ_{294}	—	September 20, 2001	Socorro	LINEAR	·	1.4 km	MPC · JPL
317083	2001 SQ_{303}	—	September 20, 2001	Socorro	LINEAR	·	2.0 km	MPC · JPL
317084	2001 SS_{303}	—	September 20, 2001	Socorro	LINEAR	·	1.8 km	MPC · JPL
317085	2001 SH_{309}	—	September 22, 2001	Socorro	LINEAR	·	1.7 km	MPC · JPL
317086	2001 SX_{322}	—	September 25, 2001	Socorro	LINEAR	·	2.0 km	MPC · JPL
317087	2001 SY_{337}	—	September 20, 2001	Socorro	LINEAR	·	4.2 km	MPC · JPL
317088	2001 SA_{342}	—	September 21, 2001	Palomar	NEAT	·	1.6 km	MPC · JPL
317089	2001 SW_{344}	—	September 23, 2001	Palomar	NEAT	·	4.1 km	MPC · JPL
317090	2001 SP_{349}	—	September 18, 2001	Anderson Mesa	LONEOS	V	870 m	MPC · JPL
317091	2001 SO_{351}	—	September 18, 2001	Apache Point	SDSS	·	2.6 km	MPC · JPL
317092	2001 TV_{1}	—	October 6, 2001	Socorro	LINEAR	·	2.2 km	MPC · JPL
317093	2001 TX_{11}	—	October 13, 2001	Socorro	LINEAR	MAS	840 m	MPC · JPL
317094	2001 TQ_{14}	—	October 7, 2001	Palomar	NEAT	·	2.0 km	MPC · JPL
317095	2001 TP_{16}	—	October 11, 2001	Socorro	LINEAR	H	810 m	MPC · JPL
317096	2001 TD_{36}	—	October 14, 2001	Socorro	LINEAR	·	810 m	MPC · JPL
317097	2001 TR_{82}	—	October 14, 2001	Socorro	LINEAR	·	3.6 km	MPC · JPL
317098	2001 TT_{84}	—	October 14, 2001	Socorro	LINEAR	·	3.6 km	MPC · JPL
317099	2001 TB_{90}	—	October 14, 2001	Socorro	LINEAR	·	2.1 km	MPC · JPL
317100	2001 TF_{102}	—	October 15, 2001	Socorro	LINEAR	·	2.2 km	MPC · JPL

== 317101–317200 ==
back to top

Designation			Discovery			Properties		Ref
Permanent	Provisional	Named after	Date	Site	Discoverer(s)	Category	Diam.	Ref
317101	2001 TQ_{127}	—	October 12, 2001	Anderson Mesa	LONEOS	MAS	910 m	MPC · JPL
317102	2001 TK_{130}	—	October 15, 2001	Kitt Peak	Spacewatch	·	2.1 km	MPC · JPL
317103	2001 TC_{141}	—	October 10, 2001	Palomar	NEAT	NYS	1.2 km	MPC · JPL
317104	2001 TD_{145}	—	October 10, 2001	Palomar	NEAT	·	780 m	MPC · JPL
317105	2001 TL_{156}	—	October 14, 2001	Kitt Peak	Spacewatch	·	2.2 km	MPC · JPL
317106	2001 TW_{166}	—	October 15, 2001	Socorro	LINEAR	·	1.9 km	MPC · JPL
317107	2001 TS_{177}	—	October 14, 2001	Socorro	LINEAR	·	1.9 km	MPC · JPL
317108	2001 TU_{178}	—	October 14, 2001	Socorro	LINEAR	·	3.3 km	MPC · JPL
317109	2001 TZ_{198}	—	October 11, 2001	Socorro	LINEAR	·	3.0 km	MPC · JPL
317110	2001 TR_{201}	—	October 11, 2001	Socorro	LINEAR	EOS	2.5 km	MPC · JPL
317111	2001 TE_{221}	—	October 14, 2001	Socorro	LINEAR	·	2.1 km	MPC · JPL
317112	2001 TY_{221}	—	October 14, 2001	Socorro	LINEAR	(31811)	4.0 km	MPC · JPL
317113	2001 TQ_{222}	—	October 14, 2001	Socorro	LINEAR	EUN	1.7 km	MPC · JPL
317114	2001 TT_{226}	—	October 14, 2001	Palomar	NEAT	·	2.3 km	MPC · JPL
317115	2001 TH_{240}	—	October 7, 2001	Palomar	NEAT	·	2.1 km	MPC · JPL
317116	2001 TL_{240}	—	October 14, 2001	Socorro	LINEAR	DOR	3.8 km	MPC · JPL
317117	2001 TD_{242}	—	October 14, 2001	Kitt Peak	Spacewatch	·	2.2 km	MPC · JPL
317118	2001 TA_{251}	—	October 14, 2001	Apache Point	SDSS	·	1.5 km	MPC · JPL
317119	2001 TJ_{255}	—	October 14, 2001	Apache Point	SDSS	fast	2.3 km	MPC · JPL
317120	2001 TS_{256}	—	October 13, 2001	Anderson Mesa	LONEOS	·	2.0 km	MPC · JPL
317121	2001 TF_{258}	—	October 8, 2001	Palomar	NEAT	L5	10 km	MPC · JPL
317122	2001 TJ_{261}	—	November 12, 2001	Apache Point	SDSS	·	1.7 km	MPC · JPL
317123	2001 US_{15}	—	October 25, 2001	Desert Eagle	W. K. Y. Yeung	·	1.6 km	MPC · JPL
317124	2001 UW_{28}	—	October 16, 2001	Socorro	LINEAR	·	3.1 km	MPC · JPL
317125	2001 UA_{36}	—	October 16, 2001	Socorro	LINEAR	·	5.2 km	MPC · JPL
317126	2001 UG_{39}	—	October 17, 2001	Socorro	LINEAR	·	1.9 km	MPC · JPL
317127	2001 UW_{40}	—	October 17, 2001	Socorro	LINEAR	·	1.2 km	MPC · JPL
317128	2001 UQ_{45}	—	October 17, 2001	Socorro	LINEAR	·	2.2 km	MPC · JPL
317129	2001 UU_{51}	—	October 17, 2001	Socorro	LINEAR	NYS	1.4 km	MPC · JPL
317130	2001 UE_{63}	—	October 17, 2001	Socorro	LINEAR	·	940 m	MPC · JPL
317131	2001 UT_{64}	—	October 18, 2001	Socorro	LINEAR	H	1.0 km	MPC · JPL
317132	2001 UV_{67}	—	October 20, 2001	Socorro	LINEAR	·	1.8 km	MPC · JPL
317133	2001 UX_{68}	—	October 17, 2001	Kitt Peak	Spacewatch	·	3.6 km	MPC · JPL
317134	2001 UC_{88}	—	October 21, 2001	Kitt Peak	Spacewatch	·	3.3 km	MPC · JPL
317135	2001 UE_{89}	—	October 20, 2001	Haleakala	NEAT	·	1.4 km	MPC · JPL
317136	2001 UC_{97}	—	October 17, 2001	Socorro	LINEAR	·	870 m	MPC · JPL
317137	2001 UR_{101}	—	October 20, 2001	Socorro	LINEAR	EUN	1.9 km	MPC · JPL
317138	2001 UZ_{119}	—	October 22, 2001	Socorro	LINEAR	·	2.2 km	MPC · JPL
317139	2001 UO_{123}	—	October 22, 2001	Palomar	NEAT	·	3.8 km	MPC · JPL
317140	2001 UU_{128}	—	October 20, 2001	Socorro	LINEAR	MAR	1.5 km	MPC · JPL
317141	2001 UD_{130}	—	October 20, 2001	Socorro	LINEAR	EOS	5.0 km	MPC · JPL
317142	2001 UR_{147}	—	October 23, 2001	Socorro	LINEAR	L5	16 km	MPC · JPL
317143	2001 UF_{158}	—	October 23, 2001	Socorro	LINEAR	(5)	2.1 km	MPC · JPL
317144	2001 UQ_{171}	—	October 24, 2001	Socorro	LINEAR	·	2.7 km	MPC · JPL
317145	2001 UN_{182}	—	October 16, 2001	Palomar	NEAT	·	2.2 km	MPC · JPL
317146	2001 UG_{190}	—	October 18, 2001	Palomar	NEAT	·	990 m	MPC · JPL
317147	2001 UT_{203}	—	October 19, 2001	Palomar	NEAT	·	2.8 km	MPC · JPL
317148	2001 UZ_{224}	—	October 23, 2001	Palomar	NEAT	·	1.7 km	MPC · JPL
317149	2001 UB_{228}	—	October 19, 2001	Palomar	NEAT	·	2.6 km	MPC · JPL
317150	2001 UC_{228}	—	October 19, 2001	Palomar	NEAT	3:2	7.0 km	MPC · JPL
317151	2001 UK_{230}	—	October 16, 2001	Palomar	NEAT	NEM	2.8 km	MPC · JPL
317152	2001 UQ_{230}	—	October 25, 2001	Apache Point	SDSS	MRX	930 m	MPC · JPL
317153	2001 VY_{13}	—	November 10, 2001	Socorro	LINEAR	·	4.1 km	MPC · JPL
317154	2001 VB_{39}	—	November 9, 2001	Socorro	LINEAR	V	910 m	MPC · JPL
317155	2001 VC_{69}	—	November 11, 2001	Socorro	LINEAR	·	3.0 km	MPC · JPL
317156	2001 VT_{71}	—	November 13, 2001	Ondřejov	P. Kušnirák	MAR	1.6 km	MPC · JPL
317157	2001 VS_{75}	—	November 15, 2001	Kitt Peak	Spacewatch	·	1.2 km	MPC · JPL
317158	2001 VK_{87}	—	November 11, 2001	Kitt Peak	Spacewatch	·	2.7 km	MPC · JPL
317159	2001 VZ_{103}	—	November 12, 2001	Socorro	LINEAR	·	3.8 km	MPC · JPL
317160	2001 VO_{116}	—	November 12, 2001	Socorro	LINEAR	NYS	1.4 km	MPC · JPL
317161	2001 VW_{129}	—	November 11, 2001	Apache Point	SDSS	·	3.3 km	MPC · JPL
317162	2001 VD_{131}	—	November 11, 2001	Apache Point	SDSS	·	4.3 km	MPC · JPL
317163	2001 VG_{133}	—	November 11, 2001	Apache Point	SDSS	·	3.3 km	MPC · JPL
317164	2001 WL_{33}	—	November 17, 2001	Socorro	LINEAR	·	2.4 km	MPC · JPL
317165	2001 WJ_{43}	—	November 18, 2001	Socorro	LINEAR	·	1.1 km	MPC · JPL
317166	2001 WF_{53}	—	November 19, 2001	Socorro	LINEAR	·	3.2 km	MPC · JPL
317167	2001 WP_{56}	—	November 19, 2001	Socorro	LINEAR	·	3.5 km	MPC · JPL
317168	2001 WX_{56}	—	November 19, 2001	Socorro	LINEAR	·	2.5 km	MPC · JPL
317169	2001 WR_{58}	—	November 19, 2001	Socorro	LINEAR	·	2.1 km	MPC · JPL
317170	2001 WS_{69}	—	November 20, 2001	Socorro	LINEAR	·	1.7 km	MPC · JPL
317171	2001 WX_{71}	—	November 20, 2001	Socorro	LINEAR	·	2.1 km	MPC · JPL
317172	2001 WC_{72}	—	November 20, 2001	Socorro	LINEAR	(2076)	810 m	MPC · JPL
317173	2001 WR_{81}	—	November 20, 2001	Socorro	LINEAR	·	2.0 km	MPC · JPL
317174	2001 XH_{71}	—	December 11, 2001	Socorro	LINEAR	EUN	1.6 km	MPC · JPL
317175	2001 XF_{111}	—	December 11, 2001	Socorro	LINEAR	·	3.2 km	MPC · JPL
317176	2001 XO_{123}	—	December 14, 2001	Socorro	LINEAR	·	4.6 km	MPC · JPL
317177	2001 XU_{123}	—	December 14, 2001	Socorro	LINEAR	THM	3.0 km	MPC · JPL
317178	2001 XX_{132}	—	December 14, 2001	Socorro	LINEAR	·	2.2 km	MPC · JPL
317179	2001 XS_{149}	—	December 14, 2001	Socorro	LINEAR	PAD	2.0 km	MPC · JPL
317180	2001 XD_{178}	—	December 14, 2001	Socorro	LINEAR	TEL	1.9 km	MPC · JPL
317181	2001 XT_{225}	—	November 12, 2001	Kitt Peak	Spacewatch	·	2.3 km	MPC · JPL
317182	2001 XY_{228}	—	December 15, 2001	Socorro	LINEAR	NYS	1.3 km	MPC · JPL
317183	2001 XA_{235}	—	December 15, 2001	Socorro	LINEAR	NYS	1.5 km	MPC · JPL
317184	2001 XP_{248}	—	December 14, 2001	Kitt Peak	Spacewatch	·	2.2 km	MPC · JPL
317185	2001 XQ_{258}	—	December 8, 2001	Anderson Mesa	LONEOS	·	4.2 km	MPC · JPL
317186	2001 XY_{258}	—	December 8, 2001	Anderson Mesa	LONEOS	·	1.9 km	MPC · JPL
317187	2001 XF_{262}	—	December 13, 2001	Palomar	NEAT	·	3.3 km	MPC · JPL
317188	2001 XA_{266}	—	December 15, 2001	Socorro	LINEAR	NYS	1.4 km	MPC · JPL
317189	2001 YG_{2}	—	December 19, 2001	Socorro	LINEAR	·	880 m	MPC · JPL
317190	2001 YK_{2}	—	December 16, 2001	Anderson Mesa	LONEOS	·	2.5 km	MPC · JPL
317191	2001 YE_{55}	—	December 18, 2001	Socorro	LINEAR	·	2.6 km	MPC · JPL
317192	2001 YO_{77}	—	December 18, 2001	Socorro	LINEAR	·	1.3 km	MPC · JPL
317193	2001 YR_{80}	—	December 18, 2001	Socorro	LINEAR	·	1.3 km	MPC · JPL
317194	2001 YG_{103}	—	December 17, 2001	Socorro	LINEAR	·	2.1 km	MPC · JPL
317195	2001 YJ_{159}	—	December 18, 2001	Apache Point	SDSS	·	4.9 km	MPC · JPL
317196	2002 AK_{46}	—	January 9, 2002	Socorro	LINEAR	NYS	1.3 km	MPC · JPL
317197	2002 AE_{49}	—	January 9, 2002	Socorro	LINEAR	·	2.9 km	MPC · JPL
317198	2002 AZ_{49}	—	January 9, 2002	Socorro	LINEAR	·	890 m	MPC · JPL
317199	2002 AX_{72}	—	January 8, 2002	Socorro	LINEAR	·	870 m	MPC · JPL
317200	2002 AD_{91}	—	January 13, 2002	Socorro	LINEAR	·	2.1 km	MPC · JPL

== 317201–317300 ==
back to top

Designation			Discovery			Properties		Ref
Permanent	Provisional	Named after	Date	Site	Discoverer(s)	Category	Diam.	Ref
317201	2002 AU_{126}	—	January 13, 2002	Socorro	LINEAR	·	540 m	MPC · JPL
317202	2002 AN_{136}	—	January 9, 2002	Socorro	LINEAR	·	2.2 km	MPC · JPL
317203	2002 AD_{149}	—	January 14, 2002	Socorro	LINEAR	·	1.3 km	MPC · JPL
317204	2002 AM_{180}	—	January 12, 2002	Nyukasa	Nyukasa	HOF	3.9 km	MPC · JPL
317205	2002 AN_{205}	—	January 9, 2002	Apache Point	SDSS	AST	1.9 km	MPC · JPL
317206	2002 CY_{1}	—	February 3, 2002	Palomar	NEAT	·	2.8 km	MPC · JPL
317207	2002 CH_{10}	—	February 6, 2002	Socorro	LINEAR	·	1.0 km	MPC · JPL
317208	2002 CE_{16}	—	February 10, 2002	Cima Ekar	ADAS	·	5.0 km	MPC · JPL
317209	2002 CV_{22}	—	February 5, 2002	Palomar	NEAT	·	940 m	MPC · JPL
317210	2002 CE_{25}	—	February 7, 2002	Kitt Peak	Spacewatch	·	860 m	MPC · JPL
317211	2002 CT_{36}	—	February 7, 2002	Socorro	LINEAR	·	1.7 km	MPC · JPL
317212	2002 CW_{46}	—	February 11, 2002	Socorro	LINEAR	AMO	580 m	MPC · JPL
317213	2002 CW_{50}	—	February 12, 2002	Desert Eagle	W. K. Y. Yeung	·	760 m	MPC · JPL
317214	2002 CD_{60}	—	February 6, 2002	Socorro	LINEAR	·	1.3 km	MPC · JPL
317215	2002 CL_{68}	—	February 7, 2002	Socorro	LINEAR	·	3.0 km	MPC · JPL
317216	2002 CT_{72}	—	February 7, 2002	Socorro	LINEAR	·	1.1 km	MPC · JPL
317217	2002 CE_{81}	—	February 7, 2002	Socorro	LINEAR	·	2.9 km	MPC · JPL
317218	2002 CJ_{87}	—	February 7, 2002	Socorro	LINEAR	·	2.3 km	MPC · JPL
317219	2002 CV_{87}	—	February 7, 2002	Socorro	LINEAR	·	2.4 km	MPC · JPL
317220	2002 CO_{88}	—	February 7, 2002	Socorro	LINEAR	·	870 m	MPC · JPL
317221	2002 CA_{90}	—	February 5, 2002	Palomar	NEAT	·	780 m	MPC · JPL
317222	2002 CD_{101}	—	February 7, 2002	Socorro	LINEAR	BRA	2.5 km	MPC · JPL
317223	2002 CS_{115}	—	February 12, 2002	Socorro	LINEAR	·	1.2 km	MPC · JPL
317224	2002 CF_{121}	—	February 7, 2002	Socorro	LINEAR	·	930 m	MPC · JPL
317225	2002 CD_{153}	—	February 11, 2002	Socorro	LINEAR	H	500 m	MPC · JPL
317226	2002 CL_{158}	—	February 7, 2002	Socorro	LINEAR	·	740 m	MPC · JPL
317227	2002 CU_{162}	—	February 8, 2002	Socorro	LINEAR	·	1.3 km	MPC · JPL
317228	2002 CY_{166}	—	February 8, 2002	Socorro	LINEAR	·	1.6 km	MPC · JPL
317229	2002 CU_{171}	—	February 8, 2002	Socorro	LINEAR	·	2.2 km	MPC · JPL
317230	2002 CY_{179}	—	January 12, 2002	Palomar	NEAT	EOS	2.6 km	MPC · JPL
317231	2002 CJ_{180}	—	February 10, 2002	Socorro	LINEAR	·	700 m	MPC · JPL
317232	2002 CS_{184}	—	February 10, 2002	Socorro	LINEAR	·	1.6 km	MPC · JPL
317233	2002 CB_{186}	—	February 10, 2002	Socorro	LINEAR	·	700 m	MPC · JPL
317234	2002 CD_{189}	—	January 18, 2002	Socorro	LINEAR	·	860 m	MPC · JPL
317235	2002 CZ_{190}	—	February 10, 2002	Kitt Peak	Spacewatch	·	2.7 km	MPC · JPL
317236	2002 CB_{201}	—	February 7, 2002	Palomar	NEAT	·	570 m	MPC · JPL
317237	2002 CQ_{201}	—	February 10, 2002	Socorro	LINEAR	·	2.5 km	MPC · JPL
317238	2002 CZ_{205}	—	February 10, 2002	Socorro	LINEAR	·	2.3 km	MPC · JPL
317239	2002 CJ_{208}	—	February 10, 2002	Socorro	LINEAR	·	720 m	MPC · JPL
317240	2002 CO_{214}	—	February 10, 2002	Socorro	LINEAR	·	1.8 km	MPC · JPL
317241	2002 CJ_{220}	—	February 10, 2002	Socorro	LINEAR	·	1.3 km	MPC · JPL
317242	2002 CM_{230}	—	February 12, 2002	Kitt Peak	Spacewatch	·	740 m	MPC · JPL
317243	2002 CM_{234}	—	February 8, 2002	Kitt Peak	Spacewatch	KOR	1.2 km	MPC · JPL
317244	2002 CR_{252}	—	February 4, 2002	Palomar	NEAT	·	800 m	MPC · JPL
317245	2002 CA_{258}	—	February 6, 2002	Kitt Peak	M. W. Buie	·	1.2 km	MPC · JPL
317246	2002 CS_{272}	—	February 8, 2002	Anderson Mesa	LONEOS	·	3.3 km	MPC · JPL
317247	2002 CA_{273}	—	February 8, 2002	Palomar	NEAT	·	4.8 km	MPC · JPL
317248	2002 CS_{274}	—	February 8, 2002	Kitt Peak	Spacewatch	·	2.0 km	MPC · JPL
317249	2002 CZ_{290}	—	October 2, 2000	Socorro	LINEAR	·	3.5 km	MPC · JPL
317250	2002 CA_{291}	—	February 10, 2002	Socorro	LINEAR	·	930 m	MPC · JPL
317251	2002 CU_{291}	—	February 11, 2002	Socorro	LINEAR	·	4.2 km	MPC · JPL
317252	2002 CT_{307}	—	February 10, 2002	Socorro	LINEAR	(18466)	2.5 km	MPC · JPL
317253	2002 CM_{310}	—	February 6, 2002	Palomar	NEAT	RAF	1.4 km	MPC · JPL
317254	2002 CH_{315}	—	February 6, 2002	Palomar	NEAT	·	860 m	MPC · JPL
317255	2002 DJ_{5}	—	February 21, 2002	Kitt Peak	Spacewatch	APO · PHA	380 m	MPC · JPL
317256	2002 DC_{12}	—	February 21, 2002	Kitt Peak	Spacewatch	·	2.8 km	MPC · JPL
317257	2002 EO_{5}	—	March 9, 2002	Socorro	LINEAR	H	720 m	MPC · JPL
317258	2002 EY_{14}	—	March 5, 2002	Kitt Peak	Spacewatch	·	620 m	MPC · JPL
317259	2002 EV_{17}	—	March 5, 2002	Kitt Peak	Spacewatch	·	3.2 km	MPC · JPL
317260	2002 EE_{23}	—	March 5, 2002	Kitt Peak	Spacewatch	·	1.5 km	MPC · JPL
317261	2002 EA_{25}	—	March 5, 2002	Kitt Peak	Spacewatch	·	2.9 km	MPC · JPL
317262	2002 EW_{36}	—	March 9, 2002	Kitt Peak	Spacewatch	·	1.9 km	MPC · JPL
317263	2002 EK_{37}	—	March 9, 2002	Kitt Peak	Spacewatch	KOR	2.0 km	MPC · JPL
317264	2002 EA_{51}	—	March 13, 2002	Palomar	NEAT	·	3.1 km	MPC · JPL
317265	2002 EZ_{52}	—	March 9, 2002	Socorro	LINEAR	·	3.1 km	MPC · JPL
317266	2002 EQ_{63}	—	March 13, 2002	Socorro	LINEAR	NYS	1.1 km	MPC · JPL
317267	2002 EY_{63}	—	September 28, 2000	Kitt Peak	Spacewatch	·	920 m	MPC · JPL
317268	2002 EF_{69}	—	March 13, 2002	Socorro	LINEAR	·	1.8 km	MPC · JPL
317269	2002 EZ_{71}	—	March 13, 2002	Socorro	LINEAR	·	1.4 km	MPC · JPL
317270	2002 EJ_{76}	—	March 10, 2002	Kitt Peak	Spacewatch	KOR	1.4 km	MPC · JPL
317271	2002 EO_{96}	—	March 11, 2002	Kitt Peak	Spacewatch	·	720 m	MPC · JPL
317272	2002 EQ_{106}	—	March 9, 2002	Anderson Mesa	LONEOS	(2076)	1.2 km	MPC · JPL
317273	2002 ED_{110}	—	March 9, 2002	Kitt Peak	Spacewatch	·	740 m	MPC · JPL
317274	2002 ED_{116}	—	March 11, 2002	Kitt Peak	Spacewatch	·	1.6 km	MPC · JPL
317275	2002 EL_{118}	—	March 10, 2002	Kitt Peak	Spacewatch	·	1.9 km	MPC · JPL
317276	2002 EB_{123}	—	March 12, 2002	Palomar	NEAT	V	850 m	MPC · JPL
317277	2002 EQ_{127}	—	March 12, 2002	Palomar	NEAT	·	2.4 km	MPC · JPL
317278	2002 EG_{136}	—	March 12, 2002	Kitt Peak	Spacewatch	(5)	2.2 km	MPC · JPL
317279	2002 EJ_{137}	—	March 12, 2002	Palomar	NEAT	·	2.5 km	MPC · JPL
317280	2002 EE_{148}	—	March 15, 2002	Palomar	NEAT	·	2.4 km	MPC · JPL
317281	2002 EC_{151}	—	March 15, 2002	Palomar	NEAT	·	1.2 km	MPC · JPL
317282	2002 EB_{162}	—	March 11, 2002	Palomar	NEAT	·	870 m	MPC · JPL
317283	2002 ED_{162}	—	March 5, 2002	Apache Point	SDSS	·	700 m	MPC · JPL
317284	2002 FQ_{7}	—	March 16, 2002	Kitt Peak	Spacewatch	·	2.4 km	MPC · JPL
317285	2002 FE_{9}	—	March 16, 2002	Socorro	LINEAR	·	980 m	MPC · JPL
317286	2002 FH_{34}	—	March 20, 2002	Socorro	LINEAR	·	2.9 km	MPC · JPL
317287	2002 FR_{36}	—	March 22, 2002	Palomar	NEAT	L4	14 km	MPC · JPL
317288	2002 GR_{1}	—	April 5, 2002	Emerald Lane	L. Ball	·	3.5 km	MPC · JPL
317289	2002 GK_{13}	—	April 14, 2002	Socorro	LINEAR	·	3.5 km	MPC · JPL
317290	2002 GF_{47}	—	April 4, 2002	Kitt Peak	Spacewatch	·	1.1 km	MPC · JPL
317291	2002 GD_{48}	—	April 4, 2002	Palomar	NEAT	V	570 m	MPC · JPL
317292	2002 GF_{52}	—	April 5, 2002	Anderson Mesa	LONEOS	·	800 m	MPC · JPL
317293	2002 GJ_{60}	—	April 8, 2002	Socorro	LINEAR	·	2.9 km	MPC · JPL
317294	2002 GN_{60}	—	April 8, 2002	Kitt Peak	Spacewatch	·	4.0 km	MPC · JPL
317295	2002 GG_{69}	—	April 8, 2002	Palomar	NEAT	·	900 m	MPC · JPL
317296	2002 GJ_{73}	—	April 9, 2002	Anderson Mesa	LONEOS	EOS	3.1 km	MPC · JPL
317297	2002 GR_{73}	—	April 9, 2002	Palomar	NEAT	·	1.0 km	MPC · JPL
317298	2002 GF_{77}	—	April 9, 2002	Anderson Mesa	LONEOS	·	950 m	MPC · JPL
317299	2002 GV_{84}	—	April 10, 2002	Socorro	LINEAR	·	860 m	MPC · JPL
317300	2002 GT_{85}	—	April 10, 2002	Socorro	LINEAR	EOS	2.8 km	MPC · JPL

== 317301–317400 ==
back to top

Designation			Discovery			Properties		Ref
Permanent	Provisional	Named after	Date	Site	Discoverer(s)	Category	Diam.	Ref
317301	2002 GN_{89}	—	April 8, 2002	Palomar	NEAT	·	2.4 km	MPC · JPL
317302	2002 GX_{91}	—	April 9, 2002	Palomar	NEAT	·	2.9 km	MPC · JPL
317303	2002 GV_{98}	—	April 10, 2002	Socorro	LINEAR	·	1.6 km	MPC · JPL
317304	2002 GB_{100}	—	April 10, 2002	Socorro	LINEAR	·	880 m	MPC · JPL
317305	2002 GQ_{108}	—	April 11, 2002	Socorro	LINEAR	·	2.2 km	MPC · JPL
317306	2002 GH_{110}	—	April 10, 2002	Socorro	LINEAR	·	1.0 km	MPC · JPL
317307	2002 GR_{110}	—	April 10, 2002	Socorro	LINEAR	NYS	1.3 km	MPC · JPL
317308	2002 GW_{127}	—	April 12, 2002	Socorro	LINEAR	·	920 m	MPC · JPL
317309	2002 GX_{131}	—	April 12, 2002	Socorro	LINEAR	·	3.2 km	MPC · JPL
317310	2002 GP_{141}	—	April 13, 2002	Palomar	NEAT	·	900 m	MPC · JPL
317311	2002 GM_{153}	—	April 12, 2002	Palomar	NEAT	V	900 m	MPC · JPL
317312	2002 GA_{170}	—	April 9, 2002	Socorro	LINEAR	·	930 m	MPC · JPL
317313	2002 GG_{179}	—	April 13, 2002	Palomar	NEAT	·	2.9 km	MPC · JPL
317314	2002 GY_{183}	—	April 9, 2002	Palomar	NEAT	EOS	2.3 km	MPC · JPL
317315	2002 GE_{185}	—	April 9, 2002	Palomar	NEAT	·	900 m	MPC · JPL
317316	2002 GJ_{188}	—	February 21, 2001	Kitt Peak	Spacewatch	L4	9.7 km	MPC · JPL
317317	2002 HU_{3}	—	April 16, 2002	Socorro	LINEAR	·	4.0 km	MPC · JPL
317318	2002 HG_{11}	—	April 21, 2002	Palomar	NEAT	·	3.3 km	MPC · JPL
317319	2002 HH_{15}	—	April 17, 2002	Socorro	LINEAR	EUN	1.7 km	MPC · JPL
317320	2002 HY_{16}	—	April 19, 2002	Kitt Peak	Spacewatch	·	2.3 km	MPC · JPL
317321	2002 JZ_{1}	—	May 4, 2002	Desert Eagle	W. K. Y. Yeung	·	2.0 km	MPC · JPL
317322	2002 JF_{4}	—	May 5, 2002	Socorro	LINEAR	PHO	1.1 km	MPC · JPL
317323	2002 JZ_{6}	—	May 3, 2002	Palomar	NEAT	·	1.2 km	MPC · JPL
317324	2002 JC_{8}	—	April 10, 2002	Socorro	LINEAR	·	800 m	MPC · JPL
317325	2002 JH_{8}	—	May 6, 2002	Palomar	NEAT	·	1.2 km	MPC · JPL
317326	2002 JG_{24}	—	May 8, 2002	Socorro	LINEAR	·	1.6 km	MPC · JPL
317327	2002 JV_{26}	—	May 8, 2002	Socorro	LINEAR	·	2.9 km	MPC · JPL
317328	2002 JT_{28}	—	May 9, 2002	Socorro	LINEAR	EOS	3.1 km	MPC · JPL
317329	2002 JS_{36}	—	May 7, 2002	Anderson Mesa	LONEOS	·	1.1 km	MPC · JPL
317330	2002 JJ_{58}	—	May 9, 2002	Socorro	LINEAR	H	870 m	MPC · JPL
317331	2002 JD_{67}	—	May 10, 2002	Socorro	LINEAR	MAS	880 m	MPC · JPL
317332	2002 JB_{72}	—	May 8, 2002	Socorro	LINEAR	·	5.0 km	MPC · JPL
317333	2002 JN_{84}	—	May 11, 2002	Socorro	LINEAR	·	950 m	MPC · JPL
317334	2002 JH_{87}	—	May 11, 2002	Socorro	LINEAR	·	1.0 km	MPC · JPL
317335	2002 JT_{94}	—	May 11, 2002	Socorro	LINEAR	·	2.6 km	MPC · JPL
317336	2002 JC_{101}	—	May 6, 2002	Socorro	LINEAR	·	3.6 km	MPC · JPL
317337	2002 JB_{103}	—	May 9, 2002	Socorro	LINEAR	·	2.6 km	MPC · JPL
317338	2002 JD_{103}	—	May 9, 2002	Socorro	LINEAR	NYS	1.4 km	MPC · JPL
317339	2002 JA_{104}	—	May 10, 2002	Socorro	LINEAR	·	5.0 km	MPC · JPL
317340	2002 JW_{120}	—	May 5, 2002	Palomar	NEAT	H	560 m	MPC · JPL
317341	2002 JO_{122}	—	May 6, 2002	Socorro	LINEAR	TIR	4.3 km	MPC · JPL
317342	2002 JZ_{122}	—	May 6, 2002	Palomar	NEAT	TIR	6.1 km	MPC · JPL
317343	2002 JA_{137}	—	May 9, 2002	Palomar	NEAT	·	4.3 km	MPC · JPL
317344	2002 JN_{147}	—	May 11, 2002	Socorro	LINEAR	·	2.1 km	MPC · JPL
317345	2002 KB_{1}	—	May 16, 2002	Socorro	LINEAR	H	750 m	MPC · JPL
317346	2002 KK_{15}	—	May 30, 2002	Palomar	NEAT	·	2.3 km	MPC · JPL
317347	2002 LF_{27}	—	June 8, 2002	Socorro	LINEAR	·	2.9 km	MPC · JPL
317348	2002 LC_{32}	—	June 10, 2002	Socorro	LINEAR	(2076)	1.1 km	MPC · JPL
317349	2002 LB_{38}	—	May 30, 2002	Palomar	NEAT	·	3.0 km	MPC · JPL
317350	2002 LV_{38}	—	June 10, 2002	Palomar	NEAT	·	1.2 km	MPC · JPL
317351	2002 LX_{44}	—	June 5, 2002	Anderson Mesa	LONEOS	·	930 m	MPC · JPL
317352	2002 LT_{60}	—	June 3, 2002	Palomar	NEAT	NYS	860 m	MPC · JPL
317353	2002 LL_{62}	—	June 12, 2002	Palomar	NEAT	NYS	1.0 km	MPC · JPL
317354	2002 LB_{64}	—	February 16, 2001	Nogales	Tenagra II	·	2.6 km	MPC · JPL
317355	2002 LU_{64}	—	September 27, 2003	Anderson Mesa	LONEOS	EOS	3.2 km	MPC · JPL
317356	2002 MD_{7}	—	September 18, 2003	Kitt Peak	Spacewatch	CYB	5.0 km	MPC · JPL
317357	2002 MN_{7}	—	October 20, 2003	Socorro	LINEAR	·	3.2 km	MPC · JPL
317358	2002 NW_{1}	—	July 4, 2002	Palomar	NEAT	·	1.5 km	MPC · JPL
317359	2002 NJ_{9}	—	July 3, 2002	Palomar	NEAT	PHO	1.3 km	MPC · JPL
317360	2002 NZ_{9}	—	July 3, 2002	Palomar	NEAT	·	1.4 km	MPC · JPL
317361	2002 NF_{13}	—	July 4, 2002	Palomar	NEAT	·	1.1 km	MPC · JPL
317362	2002 NZ_{15}	—	July 5, 2002	Socorro	LINEAR	·	1.5 km	MPC · JPL
317363	2002 NU_{21}	—	July 9, 2002	Socorro	LINEAR	·	1.2 km	MPC · JPL
317364	2002 NH_{29}	—	July 13, 2002	Haleakala	NEAT	·	1.5 km	MPC · JPL
317365	2002 NK_{34}	—	July 9, 2002	Socorro	LINEAR	TIR	4.4 km	MPC · JPL
317366	2002 NG_{41}	—	February 17, 2001	Kitt Peak	Spacewatch	·	1.5 km	MPC · JPL
317367	2002 NX_{57}	—	July 14, 2002	Palomar	NEAT	NYS	1.1 km	MPC · JPL
317368	2002 NO_{60}	—	July 5, 2002	Palomar	NEAT	V	920 m	MPC · JPL
317369	2002 NP_{60}	—	July 4, 2002	Palomar	NEAT	·	1.1 km	MPC · JPL
317370	2002 NE_{61}	—	July 14, 2002	Palomar	NEAT	·	3.7 km	MPC · JPL
317371	2002 NJ_{61}	—	July 14, 2002	Palomar	NEAT	·	1.1 km	MPC · JPL
317372	2002 NS_{63}	—	July 9, 2002	Palomar	NEAT	KOR	1.5 km	MPC · JPL
317373	2002 NE_{66}	—	July 9, 2002	Palomar	NEAT	·	2.4 km	MPC · JPL
317374	2002 NP_{70}	—	July 9, 2002	Palomar	NEAT	·	1.5 km	MPC · JPL
317375	2002 NH_{74}	—	July 4, 2002	Palomar	NEAT	AGN	1.5 km	MPC · JPL
317376	2002 NS_{74}	—	July 14, 2002	Palomar	NEAT	·	2.6 km	MPC · JPL
317377	2002 ND_{79}	—	September 6, 2005	Siding Spring	SSS	H	700 m	MPC · JPL
317378	2002 OT_{22}	—	July 31, 2002	Socorro	LINEAR	PHO	2.2 km	MPC · JPL
317379	2002 OW_{22}	—	July 31, 2002	Socorro	LINEAR	·	3.0 km	MPC · JPL
317380	2002 OM_{27}	—	July 21, 2002	Palomar	NEAT	(5)	1.6 km	MPC · JPL
317381	2002 OQ_{28}	—	July 21, 2002	Palomar	NEAT	·	1.0 km	MPC · JPL
317382	2002 OG_{32}	—	March 23, 2006	Kitt Peak	Spacewatch	KOR	1.7 km	MPC · JPL
317383	2002 OK_{32}	—	July 21, 2002	Palomar	NEAT	V	630 m	MPC · JPL
317384	2002 OA_{35}	—	January 7, 2006	Mount Lemmon	Mount Lemmon Survey	·	3.0 km	MPC · JPL
317385	2002 OA_{36}	—	March 8, 2005	Mount Lemmon	Mount Lemmon Survey	KOR	1.7 km	MPC · JPL
317386	2002 OD_{36}	—	December 17, 1999	Kitt Peak	Spacewatch	·	2.5 km	MPC · JPL
317387	2002 OG_{36}	—	October 2, 2003	Kitt Peak	Spacewatch	·	2.9 km	MPC · JPL
317388	2002 OP_{36}	—	February 9, 2007	Mount Lemmon	Mount Lemmon Survey	·	840 m	MPC · JPL
317389	2002 PS_{2}	—	August 3, 2002	Palomar	NEAT	·	3.8 km	MPC · JPL
317390	2002 PQ_{3}	—	August 3, 2002	Palomar	NEAT	·	3.3 km	MPC · JPL
317391	2002 PK_{7}	—	August 6, 2002	Palomar	NEAT	H	580 m	MPC · JPL
317392	2002 PQ_{39}	—	August 7, 2002	Palomar	NEAT	·	4.0 km	MPC · JPL
317393	2002 PV_{48}	—	August 10, 2002	Socorro	LINEAR	·	1.7 km	MPC · JPL
317394	2002 PZ_{48}	—	August 10, 2002	Socorro	LINEAR	PHO	1.2 km	MPC · JPL
317395	2002 PN_{81}	—	June 17, 1996	Kitt Peak	Spacewatch	EOS	2.0 km	MPC · JPL
317396	2002 PX_{83}	—	August 10, 2002	Socorro	LINEAR	NYS	1.3 km	MPC · JPL
317397	2002 PP_{89}	—	August 11, 2002	Socorro	LINEAR	·	2.1 km	MPC · JPL
317398	2002 PY_{96}	—	August 14, 2002	Socorro	LINEAR	·	2.2 km	MPC · JPL
317399	2002 PC_{113}	—	August 12, 2002	Socorro	LINEAR	H	750 m	MPC · JPL
317400	2002 PE_{114}	—	August 13, 2002	Kitt Peak	Spacewatch	MAS	670 m	MPC · JPL

== 317401–317500 ==
back to top

Designation			Discovery			Properties		Ref
Permanent	Provisional	Named after	Date	Site	Discoverer(s)	Category	Diam.	Ref
317401	2002 PG_{114}	—	August 13, 2002	Kitt Peak	Spacewatch	V	780 m	MPC · JPL
317402	2002 PF_{122}	—	August 13, 2002	Anderson Mesa	LONEOS	·	1.6 km	MPC · JPL
317403	2002 PV_{131}	—	August 13, 2002	Socorro	LINEAR	·	2.0 km	MPC · JPL
317404	2002 PT_{132}	—	August 14, 2002	Socorro	LINEAR	·	920 m	MPC · JPL
317405	2002 PW_{135}	—	August 14, 2002	Socorro	LINEAR	·	4.5 km	MPC · JPL
317406	2002 PE_{136}	—	August 14, 2002	Socorro	LINEAR	·	1.5 km	MPC · JPL
317407	2002 PY_{150}	—	July 29, 2002	Palomar	NEAT	·	1.5 km	MPC · JPL
317408	2002 PW_{158}	—	August 8, 2002	Palomar	S. F. Hönig	·	3.2 km	MPC · JPL
317409	2002 PM_{159}	—	August 8, 2002	Palomar	S. F. Hönig	·	960 m	MPC · JPL
317410	2002 PV_{174}	—	August 15, 2002	Palomar	NEAT	·	2.2 km	MPC · JPL
317411	2002 PP_{175}	—	August 11, 2002	Palomar	NEAT	·	3.6 km	MPC · JPL
317412	2002 PC_{176}	—	August 15, 2002	Palomar	NEAT	·	2.5 km	MPC · JPL
317413	2002 PG_{190}	—	August 13, 2002	Palomar	NEAT	·	4.0 km	MPC · JPL
317414	2002 PM_{194}	—	December 13, 1999	Kitt Peak	Spacewatch	·	1.6 km	MPC · JPL
317415	2002 PV_{194}	—	September 20, 2003	Kitt Peak	Spacewatch	·	4.5 km	MPC · JPL
317416	2002 PB_{195}	—	September 25, 1995	Kitt Peak	Spacewatch	·	910 m	MPC · JPL
317417	2002 PE_{195}	—	October 23, 2008	Kitt Peak	Spacewatch	KOR	1.4 km	MPC · JPL
317418	2002 PG_{196}	—	December 19, 2007	Kitt Peak	Spacewatch	·	1.7 km	MPC · JPL
317419	2002 PD_{197}	—	October 16, 2007	Kitt Peak	Spacewatch	·	1.3 km	MPC · JPL
317420	2002 PG_{197}	—	August 1, 1998	Caussols	ODAS	·	1.8 km	MPC · JPL
317421	2002 PM_{198}	—	April 12, 2005	Kitt Peak	Spacewatch	·	960 m	MPC · JPL
317422	2002 PE_{199}	—	May 21, 2006	Kitt Peak	Spacewatch	·	2.2 km	MPC · JPL
317423	2002 QA_{8}	—	August 19, 2002	Palomar	NEAT	NYS	850 m	MPC · JPL
317424	2002 QV_{10}	—	August 24, 2002	Palomar	NEAT	(5)	1.4 km	MPC · JPL
317425	2002 QW_{10}	—	August 24, 2002	Palomar	NEAT	V · slow	980 m	MPC · JPL
317426	2002 QT_{15}	—	August 21, 2002	Palomar	NEAT	H	780 m	MPC · JPL
317427	2002 QX_{17}	—	August 28, 2002	Palomar	NEAT	·	1.4 km	MPC · JPL
317428	2002 QX_{18}	—	August 26, 2002	Palomar	NEAT	·	1.2 km	MPC · JPL
317429	2002 QH_{23}	—	August 27, 2002	Palomar	NEAT	·	1.5 km	MPC · JPL
317430	2002 QE_{25}	—	August 27, 2002	Palomar	NEAT	·	1.1 km	MPC · JPL
317431	2002 QW_{25}	—	August 29, 2002	Kitt Peak	Spacewatch	THM	3.0 km	MPC · JPL
317432	2002 QB_{29}	—	August 29, 2002	Kitt Peak	Spacewatch	·	2.0 km	MPC · JPL
317433	2002 QS_{33}	—	August 29, 2002	Palomar	NEAT	HYG	4.8 km	MPC · JPL
317434	2002 QX_{35}	—	August 29, 2002	Palomar	NEAT	·	3.5 km	MPC · JPL
317435	2002 QN_{49}	—	August 30, 2002	Palomar	R. Matson	·	1.7 km	MPC · JPL
317436	2002 QJ_{51}	—	August 16, 2002	Palomar	Lowe, A.	·	1.2 km	MPC · JPL
317437	2002 QN_{60}	—	August 16, 2002	Palomar	NEAT	HOF	3.7 km	MPC · JPL
317438	2002 QQ_{77}	—	August 29, 2002	Palomar	NEAT	EOS ·	3.4 km	MPC · JPL
317439	2002 QM_{80}	—	August 28, 2002	Palomar	NEAT	·	2.1 km	MPC · JPL
317440	2002 QH_{82}	—	August 29, 2002	Palomar	NEAT	·	3.3 km	MPC · JPL
317441	2002 QR_{91}	—	August 30, 2002	Palomar	NEAT	·	1.0 km	MPC · JPL
317442	2002 QY_{102}	—	August 19, 2002	Palomar	NEAT	·	1.8 km	MPC · JPL
317443	2002 QC_{110}	—	August 17, 2002	Palomar	NEAT	AGN	1.3 km	MPC · JPL
317444	2002 QZ_{110}	—	August 17, 2002	Palomar	NEAT	·	1.2 km	MPC · JPL
317445	2002 QG_{112}	—	August 17, 2002	Palomar	NEAT	·	2.4 km	MPC · JPL
317446	2002 QY_{113}	—	August 27, 2002	Palomar	NEAT	·	1.3 km	MPC · JPL
317447	2002 QF_{124}	—	August 16, 2002	Palomar	NEAT	·	3.2 km	MPC · JPL
317448	2002 QH_{125}	—	October 27, 2003	Anderson Mesa	LONEOS	CYB	6.3 km	MPC · JPL
317449	2002 QJ_{137}	—	September 13, 2007	Mount Lemmon	Mount Lemmon Survey	·	2.3 km	MPC · JPL
317450	2002 QM_{137}	—	March 17, 2005	Mount Lemmon	Mount Lemmon Survey	·	1.4 km	MPC · JPL
317451	2002 QR_{138}	—	August 17, 2002	Palomar	NEAT	·	1.6 km	MPC · JPL
317452 Wurukang	2002 QT_{140}	Wurukang	August 7, 2010	XuYi	PMO NEO Survey Program	·	1.2 km	MPC · JPL
317453	2002 QK_{146}	—	December 1, 2003	Kitt Peak	Spacewatch	·	2.3 km	MPC · JPL
317454	2002 QT_{146}	—	March 23, 2006	Kitt Peak	Spacewatch	·	2.3 km	MPC · JPL
317455	2002 QE_{149}	—	July 28, 2009	Kitt Peak	Spacewatch	·	1.1 km	MPC · JPL
317456	2002 RP	—	September 2, 2002	Ondřejov	P. Kušnirák	·	930 m	MPC · JPL
317457	2002 RH_{11}	—	September 4, 2002	Palomar	NEAT	·	2.8 km	MPC · JPL
317458	2002 RJ_{18}	—	September 4, 2002	Anderson Mesa	LONEOS	·	1.4 km	MPC · JPL
317459	2002 RY_{21}	—	September 4, 2002	Anderson Mesa	LONEOS	·	1.2 km	MPC · JPL
317460	2002 RF_{50}	—	September 5, 2002	Socorro	LINEAR	·	1.6 km	MPC · JPL
317461	2002 RG_{60}	—	September 5, 2002	Socorro	LINEAR	·	2.3 km	MPC · JPL
317462	2002 RS_{68}	—	September 4, 2002	Anderson Mesa	LONEOS	H	690 m	MPC · JPL
317463	2002 RF_{123}	—	September 8, 2002	Haleakala	NEAT	·	1.5 km	MPC · JPL
317464	2002 RL_{127}	—	September 10, 2002	Palomar	NEAT	·	2.7 km	MPC · JPL
317465	2002 RY_{129}	—	September 10, 2002	Palomar	NEAT	·	2.7 km	MPC · JPL
317466	2002 RK_{137}	—	September 12, 2002	Palomar	NEAT	·	1.9 km	MPC · JPL
317467	2002 RL_{142}	—	September 11, 2002	Palomar	NEAT	LUT	5.1 km	MPC · JPL
317468	2002 RM_{142}	—	September 11, 2002	Palomar	NEAT	·	1.2 km	MPC · JPL
317469	2002 RJ_{143}	—	September 11, 2002	Palomar	NEAT	·	1.4 km	MPC · JPL
317470	2002 RK_{147}	—	September 11, 2002	Palomar	NEAT	AGN	1.2 km	MPC · JPL
317471	2002 RV_{158}	—	September 11, 2002	Palomar	NEAT	CYB	5.7 km	MPC · JPL
317472	2002 RX_{163}	—	September 12, 2002	Palomar	NEAT	·	1.4 km	MPC · JPL
317473	2002 RW_{173}	—	September 13, 2002	Palomar	NEAT	·	1.7 km	MPC · JPL
317474	2002 RE_{175}	—	September 13, 2002	Palomar	NEAT	GEF	1.5 km	MPC · JPL
317475	2002 RH_{192}	—	September 12, 2002	Palomar	NEAT	NYS	1.4 km	MPC · JPL
317476	2002 RX_{192}	—	September 12, 2002	Palomar	NEAT	·	1.3 km	MPC · JPL
317477	2002 RT_{198}	—	September 13, 2002	Palomar	NEAT	HOF	3.0 km	MPC · JPL
317478	2002 RF_{216}	—	September 13, 2002	Anderson Mesa	LONEOS	H	750 m	MPC · JPL
317479	2002 RT_{219}	—	September 15, 2002	Palomar	NEAT	·	2.8 km	MPC · JPL
317480	2002 RV_{239}	—	September 1, 2002	Palomar	S. F. Hönig	NYS	1.1 km	MPC · JPL
317481	2002 RO_{248}	—	September 14, 2002	Palomar	NEAT	·	1.9 km	MPC · JPL
317482	2002 RQ_{262}	—	September 13, 2002	Palomar	NEAT	·	1.9 km	MPC · JPL
317483	2002 RX_{264}	—	September 15, 2002	Palomar	NEAT	·	3.1 km	MPC · JPL
317484	2002 RS_{271}	—	September 4, 2002	Palomar	NEAT	CYB	4.2 km	MPC · JPL
317485	2002 RD_{283}	—	September 15, 2002	Palomar	NEAT	KOR	1.6 km	MPC · JPL
317486	2002 RH_{290}	—	January 17, 2005	Kitt Peak	Spacewatch	·	4.1 km	MPC · JPL
317487	2002 RW_{290}	—	April 9, 2005	Anderson Mesa	LONEOS	·	2.0 km	MPC · JPL
317488	2002 SX_{5}	—	September 27, 2002	Palomar	NEAT	·	1.4 km	MPC · JPL
317489	2002 SD_{8}	—	September 27, 2002	Palomar	NEAT	·	1.8 km	MPC · JPL
317490	2002 SJ_{9}	—	September 27, 2002	Palomar	NEAT	THM	2.9 km	MPC · JPL
317491	2002 SO_{11}	—	September 27, 2002	Palomar	NEAT	·	1.7 km	MPC · JPL
317492	2002 SL_{17}	—	September 26, 2002	Palomar	NEAT	(5)	1.5 km	MPC · JPL
317493	2002 SU_{34}	—	September 29, 2002	Haleakala	NEAT	PHO	1.5 km	MPC · JPL
317494	2002 SL_{39}	—	September 30, 2002	Socorro	LINEAR	·	7.7 km	MPC · JPL
317495	2002 SO_{51}	—	September 17, 2002	Haleakala	NEAT	·	760 m	MPC · JPL
317496	2002 SO_{52}	—	September 17, 2002	Palomar	NEAT	·	830 m	MPC · JPL
317497	2002 SD_{69}	—	September 26, 2002	Palomar	NEAT	·	1.0 km	MPC · JPL
317498	2002 SJ_{70}	—	September 26, 2002	Palomar	NEAT	·	2.8 km	MPC · JPL
317499	2002 TW	—	October 1, 2002	Anderson Mesa	LONEOS	·	1.5 km	MPC · JPL
317500	2002 TN_{1}	—	October 1, 2002	Anderson Mesa	LONEOS	·	1.4 km	MPC · JPL

== 317501–317600 ==
back to top

Designation			Discovery			Properties		Ref
Permanent	Provisional	Named after	Date	Site	Discoverer(s)	Category	Diam.	Ref
317501	2002 TZ_{3}	—	October 1, 2002	Anderson Mesa	LONEOS	(5)	1.4 km	MPC · JPL
317502	2002 TK_{5}	—	October 1, 2002	Socorro	LINEAR	·	990 m	MPC · JPL
317503	2002 TS_{10}	—	October 2, 2002	Socorro	LINEAR	H	820 m	MPC · JPL
317504	2002 TJ_{15}	—	October 2, 2002	Socorro	LINEAR	·	1.7 km	MPC · JPL
317505	2002 TH_{18}	—	October 2, 2002	Socorro	LINEAR	·	1.5 km	MPC · JPL
317506	2002 TO_{22}	—	October 2, 2002	Socorro	LINEAR	·	1.7 km	MPC · JPL
317507	2002 TM_{31}	—	October 2, 2002	Socorro	LINEAR	·	1.7 km	MPC · JPL
317508	2002 TQ_{31}	—	October 2, 2002	Socorro	LINEAR	H	680 m	MPC · JPL
317509	2002 TO_{33}	—	October 2, 2002	Socorro	LINEAR	·	1.1 km	MPC · JPL
317510	2002 TJ_{54}	—	October 2, 2002	Socorro	LINEAR	·	2.6 km	MPC · JPL
317511	2002 TX_{67}	—	October 5, 2002	Socorro	LINEAR	·	2.0 km	MPC · JPL
317512	2002 TL_{71}	—	October 3, 2002	Palomar	NEAT	·	1.5 km	MPC · JPL
317513	2002 TT_{72}	—	October 3, 2002	Palomar	NEAT	V	910 m	MPC · JPL
317514	2002 TQ_{75}	—	October 1, 2002	Anderson Mesa	LONEOS	·	2.3 km	MPC · JPL
317515	2002 TF_{82}	—	October 1, 2002	Haleakala	NEAT	·	1.9 km	MPC · JPL
317516	2002 TN_{87}	—	October 3, 2002	Socorro	LINEAR	·	1.3 km	MPC · JPL
317517	2002 TK_{101}	—	October 4, 2002	Socorro	LINEAR	(5)	1.3 km	MPC · JPL
317518	2002 TX_{123}	—	October 4, 2002	Palomar	NEAT	·	2.5 km	MPC · JPL
317519	2002 TS_{142}	—	October 4, 2002	Socorro	LINEAR	·	1.6 km	MPC · JPL
317520	2002 TR_{147}	—	October 4, 2002	Palomar	NEAT	EOS	2.4 km	MPC · JPL
317521	2002 TM_{148}	—	October 5, 2002	Palomar	NEAT	PHO	1.2 km	MPC · JPL
317522	2002 TS_{162}	—	October 5, 2002	Palomar	NEAT	·	2.0 km	MPC · JPL
317523	2002 TE_{174}	—	October 4, 2002	Socorro	LINEAR	·	3.2 km	MPC · JPL
317524	2002 TK_{184}	—	October 4, 2002	Socorro	LINEAR	CYB	3.8 km	MPC · JPL
317525	2002 TL_{197}	—	October 4, 2002	Socorro	LINEAR	·	960 m	MPC · JPL
317526	2002 TV_{204}	—	October 4, 2002	Socorro	LINEAR	ERI	1.9 km	MPC · JPL
317527	2002 TM_{226}	—	October 8, 2002	Anderson Mesa	LONEOS	·	2.2 km	MPC · JPL
317528	2002 TP_{236}	—	October 6, 2002	Socorro	LINEAR	·	5.5 km	MPC · JPL
317529	2002 TR_{239}	—	October 9, 2002	Socorro	LINEAR	·	1.8 km	MPC · JPL
317530	2002 TE_{269}	—	October 9, 2002	Socorro	LINEAR	(5)	1.2 km	MPC · JPL
317531	2002 TB_{280}	—	October 10, 2002	Socorro	LINEAR	·	790 m	MPC · JPL
317532	2002 TP_{288}	—	October 10, 2002	Socorro	LINEAR	BAR	1.8 km	MPC · JPL
317533	2002 TS_{307}	—	October 4, 2002	Apache Point	SDSS	·	1.7 km	MPC · JPL
317534	2002 TR_{309}	—	October 4, 2002	Apache Point	SDSS	·	2.5 km	MPC · JPL
317535	2002 TR_{312}	—	October 4, 2002	Apache Point	SDSS	·	1.4 km	MPC · JPL
317536	2002 TJ_{324}	—	October 5, 2002	Apache Point	SDSS	·	990 m	MPC · JPL
317537	2002 TK_{326}	—	October 5, 2002	Apache Point	SDSS	·	2.2 km	MPC · JPL
317538	2002 TS_{350}	—	October 10, 2002	Apache Point	SDSS	·	4.0 km	MPC · JPL
317539	2002 TG_{351}	—	October 10, 2002	Apache Point	SDSS	V	630 m	MPC · JPL
317540	2002 TR_{356}	—	October 10, 2002	Apache Point	SDSS	·	1.3 km	MPC · JPL
317541	2002 UC	—	October 16, 2002	Palomar	NEAT	·	2.6 km	MPC · JPL
317542	2002 UH_{4}	—	October 28, 2002	Socorro	LINEAR	·	6.4 km	MPC · JPL
317543	2002 UB_{5}	—	October 26, 2002	Haleakala	NEAT	·	1.2 km	MPC · JPL
317544	2002 UC_{8}	—	October 28, 2002	Palomar	NEAT	·	1.9 km	MPC · JPL
317545	2002 UH_{12}	—	October 30, 2002	Haleakala	NEAT	H	950 m	MPC · JPL
317546	2002 UE_{15}	—	October 30, 2002	Socorro	LINEAR	·	1.3 km	MPC · JPL
317547	2002 UW_{18}	—	October 30, 2002	Kitt Peak	Spacewatch	·	3.6 km	MPC · JPL
317548	2002 UQ_{30}	—	October 30, 2002	Kitt Peak	Spacewatch	·	1.2 km	MPC · JPL
317549	2002 UM_{34}	—	October 30, 2002	Palomar	NEAT	(5)	1.4 km	MPC · JPL
317550	2002 UE_{39}	—	October 31, 2002	Palomar	NEAT	THM	2.7 km	MPC · JPL
317551	2002 UP_{40}	—	October 31, 2002	Socorro	LINEAR	·	3.6 km	MPC · JPL
317552	2002 UD_{41}	—	October 31, 2002	Palomar	NEAT	·	5.9 km	MPC · JPL
317553	2002 UM_{45}	—	October 31, 2002	Socorro	LINEAR	·	3.8 km	MPC · JPL
317554	2002 UD_{60}	—	October 29, 2002	Apache Point	SDSS	KON	3.1 km	MPC · JPL
317555	2002 UH_{72}	—	October 30, 2002	Palomar	NEAT	·	2.8 km	MPC · JPL
317556	2002 UA_{78}	—	October 31, 2002	Palomar	NEAT	KOR	1.6 km	MPC · JPL
317557	2002 VD_{3}	—	November 1, 2002	Palomar	NEAT	EUN	1.5 km	MPC · JPL
317558	2002 VF_{7}	—	November 4, 2002	Palomar	NEAT	·	1.2 km	MPC · JPL
317559	2002 VC_{19}	—	November 4, 2002	Palomar	NEAT	·	1.6 km	MPC · JPL
317560	2002 VN_{19}	—	November 4, 2002	Palomar	NEAT	·	940 m	MPC · JPL
317561	2002 VY_{44}	—	November 5, 2002	Anderson Mesa	LONEOS	·	1.6 km	MPC · JPL
317562	2002 VE_{47}	—	November 5, 2002	Palomar	NEAT	·	1.4 km	MPC · JPL
317563	2002 VD_{62}	—	November 5, 2002	Socorro	LINEAR	MAR · slow	1.4 km	MPC · JPL
317564	2002 VG_{72}	—	November 7, 2002	Socorro	LINEAR	MAS	1.2 km	MPC · JPL
317565	2002 VR_{73}	—	November 7, 2002	Socorro	LINEAR	·	1.5 km	MPC · JPL
317566	2002 VS_{107}	—	November 12, 2002	Socorro	LINEAR	·	1.4 km	MPC · JPL
317567	2002 VV_{109}	—	November 12, 2002	Socorro	LINEAR	(5)	1.6 km	MPC · JPL
317568	2002 VL_{114}	—	November 13, 2002	Palomar	NEAT	MAS	880 m	MPC · JPL
317569	2002 VY_{115}	—	November 11, 2002	Socorro	LINEAR	·	1.3 km	MPC · JPL
317570	2002 VO_{118}	—	November 12, 2002	Anderson Mesa	LONEOS	·	2.3 km	MPC · JPL
317571	2002 VB_{120}	—	November 12, 2002	Socorro	LINEAR	·	1.4 km	MPC · JPL
317572	2002 VG_{125}	—	November 13, 2002	Palomar	NEAT	EUN	2.8 km	MPC · JPL
317573	2002 VS_{126}	—	November 13, 2002	Palomar	NEAT	·	4.8 km	MPC · JPL
317574	2002 VE_{140}	—	November 11, 2002	Palomar	NEAT	·	1.7 km	MPC · JPL
317575	2002 VZ_{142}	—	November 14, 2002	Palomar	NEAT	·	1.4 km	MPC · JPL
317576	2002 VQ_{143}	—	November 15, 2002	Palomar	NEAT	CYB	5.9 km	MPC · JPL
317577	2002 VX_{143}	—	November 4, 2002	Palomar	NEAT	·	2.1 km	MPC · JPL
317578	2002 VB_{145}	—	November 4, 2002	Palomar	NEAT	·	2.7 km	MPC · JPL
317579	2002 WD_{11}	—	November 27, 2002	Anderson Mesa	LONEOS	·	2.5 km	MPC · JPL
317580	2002 WV_{13}	—	November 28, 2002	Anderson Mesa	LONEOS	·	1.4 km	MPC · JPL
317581	2002 WX_{14}	—	November 28, 2002	Anderson Mesa	LONEOS	ERI	1.7 km	MPC · JPL
317582	2002 WL_{15}	—	November 28, 2002	Anderson Mesa	LONEOS	V	980 m	MPC · JPL
317583	2002 WW_{19}	—	November 24, 2002	Palomar	S. F. Hönig	·	630 m	MPC · JPL
317584	2002 WH_{26}	—	November 16, 2002	Palomar	NEAT	(5)	1.3 km	MPC · JPL
317585	2002 WW_{27}	—	November 24, 2002	Palomar	NEAT	·	4.1 km	MPC · JPL
317586	2002 XG_{9}	—	December 2, 2002	Socorro	LINEAR	·	2.0 km	MPC · JPL
317587	2002 XN_{11}	—	December 3, 2002	Palomar	NEAT	·	1.6 km	MPC · JPL
317588	2002 XO_{13}	—	December 3, 2002	Palomar	NEAT	·	1.3 km	MPC · JPL
317589	2002 XA_{20}	—	December 2, 2002	Socorro	LINEAR	·	1.9 km	MPC · JPL
317590	2002 XW_{20}	—	December 2, 2002	Socorro	LINEAR	·	2.2 km	MPC · JPL
317591	2002 XX_{23}	—	December 5, 2002	Socorro	LINEAR	·	2.6 km	MPC · JPL
317592	2002 XK_{29}	—	December 5, 2002	Fountain Hills	Hills, Fountain	·	2.7 km	MPC · JPL
317593	2002 XT_{31}	—	December 6, 2002	Socorro	LINEAR	·	2.0 km	MPC · JPL
317594	2002 XW_{38}	—	December 9, 2002	Kitt Peak	Spacewatch	·	1.3 km	MPC · JPL
317595	2002 XJ_{39}	—	December 9, 2002	Desert Eagle	W. K. Y. Yeung	·	1.7 km	MPC · JPL
317596	2002 XK_{39}	—	December 9, 2002	Desert Eagle	W. K. Y. Yeung	·	4.8 km	MPC · JPL
317597	2002 XO_{42}	—	December 7, 2002	Socorro	LINEAR	·	2.2 km	MPC · JPL
317598	2002 XL_{52}	—	December 10, 2002	Socorro	LINEAR	·	1.7 km	MPC · JPL
317599	2002 XG_{69}	—	December 13, 2002	Socorro	LINEAR	·	3.8 km	MPC · JPL
317600	2002 XE_{74}	—	December 11, 2002	Socorro	LINEAR	(5)	1.3 km	MPC · JPL

== 317601–317700 ==
back to top

Designation			Discovery			Properties		Ref
Permanent	Provisional	Named after	Date	Site	Discoverer(s)	Category	Diam.	Ref
317601	2002 XZ_{75}	—	December 11, 2002	Socorro	LINEAR	·	1.6 km	MPC · JPL
317602	2002 XM_{94}	—	December 2, 2002	Socorro	LINEAR	(5)	1.3 km	MPC · JPL
317603	2002 XA_{112}	—	December 6, 2002	Socorro	LINEAR	(13314)	2.4 km	MPC · JPL
317604	2002 XZ_{113}	—	December 11, 2002	Socorro	LINEAR	·	2.2 km	MPC · JPL
317605	2002 YG_{12}	—	December 31, 2002	Socorro	LINEAR	·	2.8 km	MPC · JPL
317606	2002 YQ_{15}	—	December 31, 2002	Socorro	LINEAR	·	1.7 km	MPC · JPL
317607	2002 YA_{25}	—	December 31, 2002	Socorro	LINEAR	·	2.2 km	MPC · JPL
317608	2003 AS_{7}	—	January 2, 2003	Socorro	LINEAR	·	1.6 km	MPC · JPL
317609	2003 AW_{18}	—	January 3, 2003	Socorro	LINEAR	·	1.6 km	MPC · JPL
317610	2003 AO_{21}	—	January 5, 2003	Socorro	LINEAR	·	3.3 km	MPC · JPL
317611	2003 AY_{40}	—	January 7, 2003	Socorro	LINEAR	·	4.3 km	MPC · JPL
317612	2003 AV_{47}	—	January 5, 2003	Socorro	LINEAR	·	2.2 km	MPC · JPL
317613	2003 AW_{50}	—	January 5, 2003	Socorro	LINEAR	·	1.8 km	MPC · JPL
317614	2003 AZ_{55}	—	January 5, 2003	Socorro	LINEAR	EUN	1.7 km	MPC · JPL
317615	2003 AS_{56}	—	January 5, 2003	Socorro	LINEAR	·	2.7 km	MPC · JPL
317616	2003 AW_{68}	—	January 9, 2003	Socorro	LINEAR	ADE	2.9 km	MPC · JPL
317617	2003 AC_{73}	—	January 11, 2003	Socorro	LINEAR	·	1.8 km	MPC · JPL
317618	2003 BR_{13}	—	January 26, 2003	Haleakala	NEAT	(5)	1.7 km	MPC · JPL
317619	2003 BR_{16}	—	January 26, 2003	Haleakala	NEAT	·	2.9 km	MPC · JPL
317620	2003 BL_{31}	—	January 27, 2003	Socorro	LINEAR	·	2.3 km	MPC · JPL
317621	2003 BK_{35}	—	January 27, 2003	Palomar	NEAT	·	1.2 km	MPC · JPL
317622	2003 BG_{42}	—	January 27, 2003	Haleakala	NEAT	·	1.5 km	MPC · JPL
317623	2003 BP_{64}	—	January 29, 2003	Kitt Peak	Spacewatch	·	2.4 km	MPC · JPL
317624	2003 BN_{73}	—	January 29, 2003	Palomar	NEAT	·	3.5 km	MPC · JPL
317625	2003 BV_{75}	—	January 29, 2003	Palomar	NEAT	·	2.2 km	MPC · JPL
317626	2003 BP_{76}	—	January 29, 2003	Palomar	NEAT	JUN	1.5 km	MPC · JPL
317627	2003 BX_{78}	—	January 31, 2003	Palomar	NEAT	·	1.7 km	MPC · JPL
317628	2003 BD_{83}	—	January 31, 2003	Socorro	LINEAR	DOR	2.7 km	MPC · JPL
317629	2003 CT_{2}	—	February 2, 2003	Socorro	LINEAR	EUN	1.8 km	MPC · JPL
317630	2003 CX_{14}	—	February 4, 2003	Anderson Mesa	LONEOS	·	2.1 km	MPC · JPL
317631	2003 CB_{20}	—	February 11, 2003	La Silla	Michelsen, R., G. Masi	·	2.0 km	MPC · JPL
317632	2003 CM_{20}	—	February 9, 2003	Palomar	NEAT	·	2.9 km	MPC · JPL
317633	2003 CY_{20}	—	February 13, 2003	La Silla	Michelsen, R., G. Masi	·	1.9 km	MPC · JPL
317634	2003 CL_{25}	—	February 2, 2003	Anderson Mesa	LONEOS	·	2.9 km	MPC · JPL
317635	2003 DO_{6}	—	February 22, 2003	Palomar	NEAT	·	2.3 km	MPC · JPL
317636	2003 DK_{11}	—	February 24, 2003	Campo Imperatore	CINEOS	EUN	1.8 km	MPC · JPL
317637	2003 EZ_{1}	—	March 5, 2003	Socorro	LINEAR	·	2.2 km	MPC · JPL
317638	2003 EQ_{11}	—	March 6, 2003	Socorro	LINEAR	·	1.9 km	MPC · JPL
317639	2003 EB_{23}	—	March 6, 2003	Socorro	LINEAR	·	2.8 km	MPC · JPL
317640	2003 ER_{23}	—	March 6, 2003	Socorro	LINEAR	MAS	1.0 km	MPC · JPL
317641	2003 EH_{30}	—	March 6, 2003	Palomar	NEAT	ADE	2.4 km	MPC · JPL
317642	2003 EX_{40}	—	March 8, 2003	Palomar	NEAT	·	3.1 km	MPC · JPL
317643	2003 FH_{1}	—	March 24, 2003	Socorro	LINEAR	APO	750 m	MPC · JPL
317644	2003 FU_{1}	—	March 24, 2003	Kitt Peak	Spacewatch	·	2.0 km	MPC · JPL
317645	2003 FT_{11}	—	March 23, 2003	Kitt Peak	Spacewatch	·	2.2 km	MPC · JPL
317646	2003 FY_{21}	—	March 25, 2003	Kitt Peak	Spacewatch	NYS	1.4 km	MPC · JPL
317647	2003 FE_{27}	—	March 24, 2003	Kitt Peak	Spacewatch	·	2.2 km	MPC · JPL
317648	2003 FM_{30}	—	March 25, 2003	Haleakala	NEAT	MRX	1.6 km	MPC · JPL
317649	2003 FM_{34}	—	March 23, 2003	Kitt Peak	Spacewatch	·	910 m	MPC · JPL
317650	2003 FD_{46}	—	March 24, 2003	Kitt Peak	Spacewatch	·	2.6 km	MPC · JPL
317651	2003 FU_{61}	—	March 26, 2003	Palomar	NEAT	·	2.7 km	MPC · JPL
317652	2003 FV_{62}	—	March 26, 2003	Palomar	NEAT	·	1.5 km	MPC · JPL
317653	2003 FO_{76}	—	March 27, 2003	Palomar	NEAT	·	2.0 km	MPC · JPL
317654	2003 FT_{79}	—	March 27, 2003	Palomar	NEAT	·	3.0 km	MPC · JPL
317655	2003 FU_{85}	—	March 28, 2003	Anderson Mesa	LONEOS	·	3.1 km	MPC · JPL
317656	2003 FO_{105}	—	March 26, 2003	Palomar	NEAT	·	2.2 km	MPC · JPL
317657	2003 FT_{106}	—	March 27, 2003	Anderson Mesa	LONEOS	526	2.9 km	MPC · JPL
317658	2003 FH_{112}	—	March 31, 2003	Kitt Peak	Spacewatch	·	1.0 km	MPC · JPL
317659	2003 FY_{117}	—	March 7, 2003	Anderson Mesa	LONEOS	·	2.4 km	MPC · JPL
317660	2003 FN_{118}	—	March 27, 2003	Socorro	LINEAR	DOR	3.0 km	MPC · JPL
317661	2003 FR_{120}	—	March 24, 2003	Kitt Peak	Spacewatch	·	1.6 km	MPC · JPL
317662	2003 FY_{122}	—	March 31, 2003	Cerro Tololo	Deep Lens Survey	EOS	2.3 km	MPC · JPL
317663	2003 FS_{124}	—	March 30, 2003	Kitt Peak	M. W. Buie	AEO	1.5 km	MPC · JPL
317664	2003 FJ_{131}	—	March 24, 2003	Haleakala	NEAT	·	2.6 km	MPC · JPL
317665	2003 GF_{16}	—	April 2, 2003	Haleakala	NEAT	·	1.9 km	MPC · JPL
317666	2003 GV_{25}	—	April 4, 2003	Kitt Peak	Spacewatch	GEF	1.3 km	MPC · JPL
317667	2003 GW_{26}	—	April 4, 2003	Kitt Peak	Spacewatch	AGN	1.2 km	MPC · JPL
317668	2003 GA_{38}	—	April 8, 2003	Kitt Peak	Spacewatch	L4	10 km	MPC · JPL
317669	2003 HE_{4}	—	April 24, 2003	Anderson Mesa	LONEOS	NYS	1.3 km	MPC · JPL
317670	2003 HZ_{13}	—	April 25, 2003	Campo Imperatore	CINEOS	·	840 m	MPC · JPL
317671	2003 HL_{19}	—	April 26, 2003	Kitt Peak	Spacewatch	·	2.5 km	MPC · JPL
317672	2003 HU_{39}	—	April 29, 2003	Socorro	LINEAR	·	3.9 km	MPC · JPL
317673	2003 HR_{42}	—	April 30, 2003	Socorro	LINEAR	·	3.5 km	MPC · JPL
317674	2003 HO_{50}	—	April 30, 2003	Haleakala	NEAT	·	3.0 km	MPC · JPL
317675	2003 HX_{58}	—	April 29, 2003	Kitt Peak	Spacewatch	MAS	930 m	MPC · JPL
317676	2003 JB_{3}	—	May 1, 2003	Kitt Peak	Spacewatch	WIT	1.2 km	MPC · JPL
317677	2003 JL_{5}	—	May 1, 2003	Socorro	LINEAR	·	1.3 km	MPC · JPL
317678	2003 JH_{18}	—	May 1, 2003	Kitt Peak	Spacewatch	V	730 m	MPC · JPL
317679	2003 KT	—	May 20, 2003	Reedy Creek	J. Broughton	·	3.4 km	MPC · JPL
317680	2003 KU_{3}	—	May 22, 2003	Reedy Creek	J. Broughton	·	1.3 km	MPC · JPL
317681	2003 KQ_{7}	—	May 25, 2003	Kitt Peak	Spacewatch	·	4.6 km	MPC · JPL
317682	2003 KX_{32}	—	May 27, 2003	Kitt Peak	Spacewatch	·	1.7 km	MPC · JPL
317683	2003 MS	—	June 22, 2003	Anderson Mesa	LONEOS	·	870 m	MPC · JPL
317684	2003 MY_{5}	—	June 26, 2003	Socorro	LINEAR	·	3.0 km	MPC · JPL
317685	2003 NO_{4}	—	July 5, 2003	Socorro	LINEAR	AMO +1km	810 m	MPC · JPL
317686	2003 NZ_{10}	—	July 3, 2003	Kitt Peak	Spacewatch	·	720 m	MPC · JPL
317687	2003 OD_{5}	—	July 22, 2003	Haleakala	NEAT	·	5.3 km	MPC · JPL
317688	2003 OD_{8}	—	July 25, 2003	Reedy Creek	J. Broughton	·	3.1 km	MPC · JPL
317689	2003 OF_{12}	—	July 22, 2003	Palomar	NEAT	·	6.1 km	MPC · JPL
317690	2003 OA_{17}	—	July 28, 2003	Campo Imperatore	CINEOS	EOS	2.7 km	MPC · JPL
317691	2003 OG_{23}	—	July 31, 2003	Campo Imperatore	CINEOS	·	1.1 km	MPC · JPL
317692	2003 OF_{24}	—	July 24, 2003	Palomar	NEAT	PHO	1.4 km	MPC · JPL
317693	2003 OP_{24}	—	July 24, 2003	Palomar	NEAT	·	610 m	MPC · JPL
317694	2003 OK_{26}	—	July 24, 2003	Palomar	NEAT	·	2.9 km	MPC · JPL
317695	2003 OA_{33}	—	July 24, 2003	Palomar	NEAT	·	920 m	MPC · JPL
317696	2003 PF_{5}	—	August 4, 2003	Socorro	LINEAR	·	930 m	MPC · JPL
317697	2003 PO_{5}	—	August 1, 2003	Socorro	LINEAR	·	980 m	MPC · JPL
317698	2003 PF_{6}	—	August 1, 2003	Socorro	LINEAR	·	1.1 km	MPC · JPL
317699	2003 PP_{9}	—	August 1, 2003	Socorro	LINEAR	·	730 m	MPC · JPL
317700	2003 QY	—	August 19, 2003	Pla D'Arguines	D'Arguines, Pla	·	2.4 km	MPC · JPL

== 317701–317800 ==
back to top

Designation			Discovery			Properties		Ref
Permanent	Provisional	Named after	Date	Site	Discoverer(s)	Category	Diam.	Ref
317701	2003 QZ_{2}	—	August 19, 2003	Campo Imperatore	CINEOS	EOS	2.3 km	MPC · JPL
317702	2003 QN_{3}	—	August 17, 2003	Wise	Polishook, D.	ERI	1.5 km	MPC · JPL
317703	2003 QS_{6}	—	August 20, 2003	Palomar	NEAT	·	4.4 km	MPC · JPL
317704	2003 QJ_{8}	—	August 20, 2003	Palomar	NEAT	V	760 m	MPC · JPL
317705	2003 QW_{8}	—	August 20, 2003	Campo Imperatore	CINEOS	·	3.2 km	MPC · JPL
317706	2003 QP_{15}	—	August 20, 2003	Palomar	NEAT	·	1.1 km	MPC · JPL
317707	2003 QO_{18}	—	August 22, 2003	Palomar	NEAT	·	2.5 km	MPC · JPL
317708	2003 QL_{19}	—	August 22, 2003	Haleakala	NEAT	·	4.5 km	MPC · JPL
317709	2003 QM_{20}	—	August 22, 2003	Palomar	NEAT	VER	3.7 km	MPC · JPL
317710	2003 QM_{25}	—	August 22, 2003	Palomar	NEAT	·	3.9 km	MPC · JPL
317711	2003 QK_{26}	—	August 22, 2003	Haleakala	NEAT	·	3.7 km	MPC · JPL
317712	2003 QO_{26}	—	August 22, 2003	Haleakala	NEAT	·	990 m	MPC · JPL
317713	2003 QG_{28}	—	August 21, 2003	Campo Imperatore	CINEOS	·	970 m	MPC · JPL
317714	2003 QN_{28}	—	August 22, 2003	Palomar	NEAT	·	1.2 km	MPC · JPL
317715 Guydetienne	2003 QJ_{31}	Guydetienne	August 24, 2003	Saint-Sulpice	Saint-Sulpice	·	2.7 km	MPC · JPL
317716	2003 QR_{32}	—	August 21, 2003	Palomar	NEAT	·	920 m	MPC · JPL
317717	2003 QB_{33}	—	August 21, 2003	Campo Imperatore	CINEOS	·	4.2 km	MPC · JPL
317718	2003 QJ_{40}	—	August 22, 2003	Socorro	LINEAR	·	1.1 km	MPC · JPL
317719	2003 QX_{40}	—	July 26, 2003	Palomar	NEAT	·	770 m	MPC · JPL
317720	2003 QP_{41}	—	August 22, 2003	Socorro	LINEAR	·	7.0 km	MPC · JPL
317721	2003 QR_{43}	—	August 22, 2003	Palomar	NEAT	·	3.3 km	MPC · JPL
317722	2003 QE_{48}	—	August 20, 2003	Palomar	NEAT	·	3.3 km	MPC · JPL
317723	2003 QT_{48}	—	August 21, 2003	Palomar	NEAT	·	3.4 km	MPC · JPL
317724	2003 QC_{49}	—	August 22, 2003	Palomar	NEAT	·	920 m	MPC · JPL
317725	2003 QS_{54}	—	August 23, 2003	Socorro	LINEAR	·	4.0 km	MPC · JPL
317726	2003 QU_{67}	—	August 24, 2003	Socorro	LINEAR	·	2.0 km	MPC · JPL
317727	2003 QP_{86}	—	August 25, 2003	Cerro Tololo	M. W. Buie	·	720 m	MPC · JPL
317728	2003 QY_{93}	—	August 28, 2003	Haleakala	NEAT	·	1.7 km	MPC · JPL
317729	2003 QY_{119}	—	August 28, 2003	Palomar	NEAT	·	4.3 km	MPC · JPL
317730	2003 RP	—	September 1, 2003	Socorro	LINEAR	·	870 m	MPC · JPL
317731	2003 RO_{1}	—	September 2, 2003	Reedy Creek	J. Broughton	·	1.2 km	MPC · JPL
317732	2003 RG_{16}	—	September 15, 2003	Haleakala	NEAT	·	2.6 km	MPC · JPL
317733	2003 RF_{23}	—	September 13, 2003	Haleakala	NEAT	·	2.8 km	MPC · JPL
317734	2003 RV_{24}	—	September 15, 2003	Palomar	NEAT	·	3.7 km	MPC · JPL
317735	2003 SF_{3}	—	September 16, 2003	Palomar	NEAT	·	1.3 km	MPC · JPL
317736	2003 SD_{4}	—	September 16, 2003	Kitt Peak	Spacewatch	·	4.7 km	MPC · JPL
317737	2003 SN_{8}	—	September 16, 2003	Kitt Peak	Spacewatch	·	3.3 km	MPC · JPL
317738	2003 SM_{12}	—	September 16, 2003	Palomar	NEAT	·	1.0 km	MPC · JPL
317739	2003 SR_{12}	—	September 16, 2003	Kitt Peak	Spacewatch	·	950 m	MPC · JPL
317740	2003 SY_{13}	—	September 16, 2003	Haleakala	NEAT	·	2.8 km	MPC · JPL
317741	2003 SS_{15}	—	September 16, 2003	Kitt Peak	Spacewatch	TIR	4.5 km	MPC · JPL
317742	2003 SN_{25}	—	September 17, 2003	Kitt Peak	Spacewatch	·	5.2 km	MPC · JPL
317743	2003 SM_{35}	—	September 18, 2003	Palomar	NEAT	·	4.7 km	MPC · JPL
317744	2003 SY_{35}	—	September 18, 2003	Socorro	LINEAR	·	4.8 km	MPC · JPL
317745	2003 SF_{38}	—	September 16, 2003	Palomar	NEAT	·	1.8 km	MPC · JPL
317746	2003 SS_{45}	—	September 16, 2003	Anderson Mesa	LONEOS	·	6.2 km	MPC · JPL
317747	2003 SW_{48}	—	September 18, 2003	Palomar	NEAT	·	1 km	MPC · JPL
317748	2003 SY_{48}	—	September 18, 2003	Palomar	NEAT	·	1.0 km	MPC · JPL
317749	2003 ST_{57}	—	September 16, 2003	Kitt Peak	Spacewatch	·	2.8 km	MPC · JPL
317750	2003 SD_{58}	—	September 17, 2003	Anderson Mesa	LONEOS	MAR	1.8 km	MPC · JPL
317751	2003 SK_{58}	—	September 17, 2003	Anderson Mesa	LONEOS	·	3.1 km	MPC · JPL
317752	2003 ST_{61}	—	September 17, 2003	Socorro	LINEAR	LUT	5.9 km	MPC · JPL
317753	2003 SS_{68}	—	September 17, 2003	Kitt Peak	Spacewatch	·	950 m	MPC · JPL
317754	2003 SF_{70}	—	September 17, 2003	Kitt Peak	Spacewatch	·	890 m	MPC · JPL
317755	2003 SH_{72}	—	September 18, 2003	Kitt Peak	Spacewatch	·	1.9 km	MPC · JPL
317756	2003 SL_{72}	—	September 18, 2003	Kitt Peak	Spacewatch	·	1.3 km	MPC · JPL
317757	2003 SV_{75}	—	September 18, 2003	Kitt Peak	Spacewatch	·	1.3 km	MPC · JPL
317758	2003 SR_{77}	—	September 19, 2003	Kitt Peak	Spacewatch	·	4.0 km	MPC · JPL
317759	2003 SY_{77}	—	September 19, 2003	Kitt Peak	Spacewatch	(2076)	1.0 km	MPC · JPL
317760	2003 SP_{80}	—	September 19, 2003	Kitt Peak	Spacewatch	·	1.1 km	MPC · JPL
317761	2003 SY_{81}	—	September 17, 2003	Kitt Peak	Spacewatch	EUP	4.9 km	MPC · JPL
317762	2003 SS_{88}	—	September 18, 2003	Anderson Mesa	LONEOS	·	1.7 km	MPC · JPL
317763	2003 SR_{89}	—	September 18, 2003	Palomar	NEAT	·	1.6 km	MPC · JPL
317764	2003 SW_{91}	—	September 18, 2003	Palomar	NEAT	·	4.6 km	MPC · JPL
317765	2003 SB_{93}	—	September 18, 2003	Kitt Peak	Spacewatch	·	1.4 km	MPC · JPL
317766	2003 SD_{96}	—	September 19, 2003	Socorro	LINEAR	·	840 m	MPC · JPL
317767	2003 SG_{104}	—	September 20, 2003	Haleakala	NEAT	·	4.4 km	MPC · JPL
317768	2003 SP_{104}	—	September 21, 2003	Kitt Peak	Spacewatch	·	1.4 km	MPC · JPL
317769	2003 SA_{105}	—	September 20, 2003	Palomar	NEAT	·	6.0 km	MPC · JPL
317770	2003 SO_{117}	—	September 16, 2003	Kitt Peak	Spacewatch	·	1.1 km	MPC · JPL
317771	2003 SS_{117}	—	September 16, 2003	Palomar	NEAT	·	5.6 km	MPC · JPL
317772	2003 SR_{124}	—	September 18, 2003	Kitt Peak	Spacewatch	KOR	1.5 km	MPC · JPL
317773	2003 SN_{126}	—	September 19, 2003	Haleakala	NEAT	·	1.1 km	MPC · JPL
317774	2003 SW_{127}	—	September 20, 2003	Socorro	LINEAR	·	4.0 km	MPC · JPL
317775	2003 SE_{128}	—	September 20, 2003	Kitt Peak	Spacewatch	·	2.3 km	MPC · JPL
317776	2003 ST_{130}	—	September 20, 2003	Socorro	LINEAR	·	6.0 km	MPC · JPL
317777	2003 SM_{131}	—	September 20, 2003	Socorro	LINEAR	·	1.1 km	MPC · JPL
317778	2003 SP_{133}	—	September 20, 2003	Socorro	LINEAR	EUN	2.0 km	MPC · JPL
317779	2003 SE_{138}	—	September 18, 2003	Campo Imperatore	CINEOS	·	2.9 km	MPC · JPL
317780	2003 SU_{147}	—	September 21, 2003	Kitt Peak	Spacewatch	·	3.2 km	MPC · JPL
317781	2003 ST_{153}	—	September 19, 2003	Anderson Mesa	LONEOS	·	940 m	MPC · JPL
317782	2003 SN_{154}	—	September 19, 2003	Anderson Mesa	LONEOS	·	4.2 km	MPC · JPL
317783	2003 SG_{157}	—	September 19, 2003	Anderson Mesa	LONEOS	V	800 m	MPC · JPL
317784	2003 SA_{161}	—	September 17, 2003	Palomar	NEAT	·	900 m	MPC · JPL
317785	2003 SY_{161}	—	September 18, 2003	Kitt Peak	Spacewatch	·	4.8 km	MPC · JPL
317786	2003 SG_{162}	—	September 19, 2003	Socorro	LINEAR	NYS	1.3 km	MPC · JPL
317787	2003 SE_{163}	—	September 19, 2003	Kitt Peak	Spacewatch	·	1.3 km	MPC · JPL
317788	2003 SM_{164}	—	September 20, 2003	Anderson Mesa	LONEOS	·	1.8 km	MPC · JPL
317789	2003 SM_{165}	—	September 20, 2003	Anderson Mesa	LONEOS	·	1.5 km	MPC · JPL
317790	2003 SU_{171}	—	September 18, 2003	Kitt Peak	Spacewatch	·	1.5 km	MPC · JPL
317791	2003 SF_{172}	—	September 18, 2003	Socorro	LINEAR	MAS	930 m	MPC · JPL
317792	2003 ST_{173}	—	September 18, 2003	Palomar	NEAT	·	4.0 km	MPC · JPL
317793	2003 SD_{176}	—	September 18, 2003	Palomar	NEAT	·	3.7 km	MPC · JPL
317794	2003 SF_{179}	—	September 19, 2003	Palomar	NEAT	·	1.0 km	MPC · JPL
317795	2003 SR_{182}	—	September 20, 2003	Campo Imperatore	CINEOS	·	1.1 km	MPC · JPL
317796	2003 SX_{182}	—	September 20, 2003	Campo Imperatore	CINEOS	·	1.6 km	MPC · JPL
317797	2003 SN_{183}	—	September 21, 2003	Kitt Peak	Spacewatch	·	920 m	MPC · JPL
317798	2003 SS_{188}	—	September 22, 2003	Anderson Mesa	LONEOS	·	1.5 km	MPC · JPL
317799	2003 SL_{195}	—	September 20, 2003	Palomar	NEAT	MAR	1.4 km	MPC · JPL
317800	2003 SS_{198}	—	September 21, 2003	Anderson Mesa	LONEOS	·	980 m	MPC · JPL

== 317801–317900 ==
back to top

Designation			Discovery			Properties		Ref
Permanent	Provisional	Named after	Date	Site	Discoverer(s)	Category	Diam.	Ref
317801	2003 ST_{206}	—	September 26, 2003	Socorro	LINEAR	(8737)	4.1 km	MPC · JPL
317802	2003 SV_{206}	—	September 26, 2003	Socorro	LINEAR	ERI	1.8 km	MPC · JPL
317803	2003 SR_{207}	—	September 26, 2003	Socorro	LINEAR	·	1.3 km	MPC · JPL
317804	2003 ST_{212}	—	September 25, 2003	Haleakala	NEAT	EUP	7.7 km	MPC · JPL
317805	2003 SH_{216}	—	September 26, 2003	Socorro	LINEAR	EUP	4.8 km	MPC · JPL
317806	2003 ST_{219}	—	September 28, 2003	Desert Eagle	W. K. Y. Yeung	·	1.6 km	MPC · JPL
317807	2003 SV_{221}	—	September 26, 2003	Socorro	LINEAR	·	2.6 km	MPC · JPL
317808	2003 SK_{225}	—	September 26, 2003	Socorro	LINEAR	·	3.9 km	MPC · JPL
317809 Marot	2003 SL_{228}	Marot	September 24, 2003	Saint-Sulpice	Saint-Sulpice	·	1.1 km	MPC · JPL
317810	2003 SR_{228}	—	September 26, 2003	Socorro	LINEAR	·	5.5 km	MPC · JPL
317811	2003 SR_{231}	—	September 24, 2003	Palomar	NEAT	NYS	1.2 km	MPC · JPL
317812	2003 SX_{233}	—	September 25, 2003	Palomar	NEAT	·	1.0 km	MPC · JPL
317813	2003 SF_{236}	—	September 26, 2003	Socorro	LINEAR	·	880 m	MPC · JPL
317814	2003 SX_{248}	—	September 26, 2003	Socorro	LINEAR	·	1.0 km	MPC · JPL
317815	2003 SD_{253}	—	September 27, 2003	Kitt Peak	Spacewatch	·	1.1 km	MPC · JPL
317816	2003 SH_{263}	—	September 28, 2003	Socorro	LINEAR	·	790 m	MPC · JPL
317817	2003 SO_{264}	—	September 28, 2003	Socorro	LINEAR	fast	1.8 km	MPC · JPL
317818	2003 SU_{264}	—	September 28, 2003	Socorro	LINEAR	·	1.6 km	MPC · JPL
317819	2003 SB_{265}	—	September 28, 2003	Socorro	LINEAR	VER	3.5 km	MPC · JPL
317820	2003 ST_{267}	—	September 29, 2003	Kitt Peak	Spacewatch	VER	3.8 km	MPC · JPL
317821	2003 SP_{276}	—	September 30, 2003	Uccle	T. Pauwels	·	910 m	MPC · JPL
317822	2003 SV_{277}	—	September 30, 2003	Socorro	LINEAR	·	1.2 km	MPC · JPL
317823	2003 SP_{282}	—	September 19, 2003	Kitt Peak	Spacewatch	(5)	1.9 km	MPC · JPL
317824	2003 SF_{284}	—	September 20, 2003	Socorro	LINEAR	·	1.5 km	MPC · JPL
317825	2003 SX_{288}	—	September 28, 2003	Socorro	LINEAR	·	5.3 km	MPC · JPL
317826	2003 SZ_{288}	—	September 28, 2003	Socorro	LINEAR	·	1.8 km	MPC · JPL
317827	2003 SX_{307}	—	September 27, 2003	Socorro	LINEAR	·	4.1 km	MPC · JPL
317828	2003 SE_{308}	—	September 28, 2003	Kitt Peak	Spacewatch	EOS	2.3 km	MPC · JPL
317829	2003 SK_{320}	—	September 17, 2003	Kitt Peak	Spacewatch	·	2.3 km	MPC · JPL
317830	2003 SZ_{320}	—	September 18, 2003	Campo Imperatore	CINEOS	·	1.2 km	MPC · JPL
317831	2003 SC_{321}	—	September 19, 2003	Campo Imperatore	CINEOS	MRX	1.4 km	MPC · JPL
317832	2003 SO_{325}	—	September 17, 2003	Kitt Peak	Spacewatch	·	1.3 km	MPC · JPL
317833	2003 SJ_{326}	—	September 18, 2003	Kitt Peak	Spacewatch	·	1.6 km	MPC · JPL
317834	2003 SP_{326}	—	September 18, 2003	Kitt Peak	Spacewatch	MAS	660 m	MPC · JPL
317835	2003 SH_{333}	—	September 20, 2003	Palomar	NEAT	·	1.2 km	MPC · JPL
317836	2003 SK_{345}	—	September 18, 2003	Palomar	NEAT	·	4.5 km	MPC · JPL
317837	2003 SS_{363}	—	September 26, 2003	Apache Point	SDSS	·	2.9 km	MPC · JPL
317838	2003 SL_{366}	—	September 26, 2003	Apache Point	SDSS	·	2.7 km	MPC · JPL
317839	2003 SZ_{366}	—	September 26, 2003	Apache Point	SDSS	·	1.5 km	MPC · JPL
317840	2003 SB_{404}	—	September 27, 2003	Apache Point	SDSS	EUP	6.5 km	MPC · JPL
317841	2003 SH_{420}	—	September 28, 2003	Apache Point	SDSS	MAR	1.5 km	MPC · JPL
317842	2003 SM_{423}	—	September 27, 2003	Kitt Peak	Spacewatch	·	1.5 km	MPC · JPL
317843	2003 SH_{424}	—	September 25, 2003	Mauna Kea	P. A. Wiegert	·	2.4 km	MPC · JPL
317844	2003 SU_{426}	—	September 25, 2003	Mauna Kea	P. A. Wiegert	KOR	1.5 km	MPC · JPL
317845	2003 SG_{428}	—	September 17, 2003	Kitt Peak	Spacewatch	·	5.5 km	MPC · JPL
317846	2003 SK_{428}	—	September 17, 2003	Kitt Peak	Spacewatch	·	1.6 km	MPC · JPL
317847	2003 SW_{432}	—	September 21, 2003	Palomar	NEAT	VER	3.9 km	MPC · JPL
317848	2003 TG_{7}	—	October 1, 2003	Anderson Mesa	LONEOS	·	2.2 km	MPC · JPL
317849	2003 TT_{10}	—	October 14, 2003	Palomar	NEAT	V	740 m	MPC · JPL
317850	2003 TE_{14}	—	October 15, 2003	Anderson Mesa	LONEOS	·	1.2 km	MPC · JPL
317851	2003 TC_{15}	—	October 15, 2003	Anderson Mesa	LONEOS	NYS	1.4 km	MPC · JPL
317852	2003 TQ_{15}	—	October 15, 2003	Anderson Mesa	LONEOS	·	1.4 km	MPC · JPL
317853	2003 TR_{17}	—	October 15, 2003	Palomar	NEAT	MAS	830 m	MPC · JPL
317854	2003 TU_{17}	—	October 15, 2003	Palomar	NEAT	·	4.1 km	MPC · JPL
317855	2003 TL_{27}	—	October 1, 2003	Kitt Peak	Spacewatch	·	4.2 km	MPC · JPL
317856	2003 TC_{34}	—	October 1, 2003	Kitt Peak	Spacewatch	·	4.7 km	MPC · JPL
317857	2003 TL_{36}	—	October 1, 2003	Kitt Peak	Spacewatch	·	1.2 km	MPC · JPL
317858	2003 TQ_{38}	—	October 2, 2003	Kitt Peak	Spacewatch	·	1.1 km	MPC · JPL
317859	2003 TM_{55}	—	October 5, 2003	Kitt Peak	Spacewatch	·	960 m	MPC · JPL
317860	2003 UT	—	October 16, 2003	Socorro	LINEAR	PHO	1.3 km	MPC · JPL
317861	2003 UC_{2}	—	October 16, 2003	Kitt Peak	Spacewatch	·	1.6 km	MPC · JPL
317862	2003 UE_{18}	—	October 19, 2003	Palomar	NEAT	·	1.9 km	MPC · JPL
317863	2003 UT_{23}	—	October 22, 2003	Kitt Peak	Spacewatch	NYS	1.3 km	MPC · JPL
317864	2003 UC_{26}	—	October 20, 2003	Socorro	LINEAR	·	1.8 km	MPC · JPL
317865	2003 UU_{27}	—	October 22, 2003	Goodricke-Pigott	R. A. Tucker	·	2.5 km	MPC · JPL
317866	2003 UR_{28}	—	October 20, 2003	Palomar	NEAT	·	1.2 km	MPC · JPL
317867	2003 UR_{34}	—	October 17, 2003	Kitt Peak	Spacewatch	HOF	2.8 km	MPC · JPL
317868	2003 UJ_{39}	—	October 16, 2003	Kitt Peak	Spacewatch	·	1.4 km	MPC · JPL
317869	2003 UO_{39}	—	October 16, 2003	Kitt Peak	Spacewatch	(5)	1.2 km	MPC · JPL
317870	2003 UQ_{47}	—	October 24, 2003	Haleakala	NEAT	H ·	830 m	MPC · JPL
317871	2003 UD_{52}	—	October 18, 2003	Palomar	NEAT	·	2.1 km	MPC · JPL
317872	2003 UG_{55}	—	October 18, 2003	Palomar	NEAT	·	4.3 km	MPC · JPL
317873	2003 UJ_{59}	—	October 17, 2003	Anderson Mesa	LONEOS	·	1.9 km	MPC · JPL
317874	2003 UJ_{67}	—	October 16, 2003	Kitt Peak	Spacewatch	·	3.7 km	MPC · JPL
317875	2003 UX_{75}	—	October 17, 2003	Kitt Peak	Spacewatch	·	1.9 km	MPC · JPL
317876	2003 UW_{78}	—	October 18, 2003	Kitt Peak	Spacewatch	WIT	1.3 km	MPC · JPL
317877	2003 UQ_{93}	—	October 18, 2003	Kitt Peak	Spacewatch	NYS	1.1 km	MPC · JPL
317878	2003 UY_{112}	—	October 20, 2003	Socorro	LINEAR	·	1.3 km	MPC · JPL
317879	2003 US_{113}	—	October 20, 2003	Socorro	LINEAR	·	1.6 km	MPC · JPL
317880	2003 UP_{115}	—	October 20, 2003	Palomar	NEAT	·	1.2 km	MPC · JPL
317881	2003 UT_{116}	—	October 21, 2003	Socorro	LINEAR	NYS	1.7 km	MPC · JPL
317882	2003 UA_{117}	—	October 21, 2003	Socorro	LINEAR	·	2.3 km	MPC · JPL
317883	2003 UB_{120}	—	October 18, 2003	Kitt Peak	Spacewatch	·	2.3 km	MPC · JPL
317884	2003 UK_{122}	—	October 19, 2003	Kitt Peak	Spacewatch	·	4.3 km	MPC · JPL
317885	2003 UU_{138}	—	October 16, 2003	Palomar	NEAT	·	4.1 km	MPC · JPL
317886	2003 UR_{145}	—	October 18, 2003	Anderson Mesa	LONEOS	·	1.6 km	MPC · JPL
317887	2003 UM_{150}	—	October 20, 2003	Kitt Peak	Spacewatch	·	1.8 km	MPC · JPL
317888	2003 UD_{154}	—	October 19, 2003	Kitt Peak	Spacewatch	·	970 m	MPC · JPL
317889	2003 UZ_{159}	—	October 21, 2003	Kitt Peak	Spacewatch	·	760 m	MPC · JPL
317890	2003 UY_{160}	—	October 21, 2003	Kitt Peak	Spacewatch	NYS	1.1 km	MPC · JPL
317891	2003 UL_{163}	—	October 21, 2003	Socorro	LINEAR	·	1.5 km	MPC · JPL
317892	2003 UC_{165}	—	October 21, 2003	Palomar	NEAT	·	1.3 km	MPC · JPL
317893	2003 UQ_{178}	—	October 21, 2003	Palomar	NEAT	·	1.6 km	MPC · JPL
317894	2003 UP_{188}	—	October 22, 2003	Kitt Peak	Spacewatch	·	4.8 km	MPC · JPL
317895	2003 UD_{203}	—	October 21, 2003	Kitt Peak	Spacewatch	·	2.0 km	MPC · JPL
317896	2003 UE_{203}	—	October 21, 2003	Kitt Peak	Spacewatch	·	1.1 km	MPC · JPL
317897	2003 UK_{209}	—	October 23, 2003	Kitt Peak	Spacewatch	·	1.8 km	MPC · JPL
317898	2003 UQ_{211}	—	October 23, 2003	Kitt Peak	Spacewatch	·	2.3 km	MPC · JPL
317899	2003 US_{215}	—	October 21, 2003	Kitt Peak	Spacewatch	NYS	1.2 km	MPC · JPL
317900	2003 UU_{217}	—	October 21, 2003	Socorro	LINEAR	·	1.2 km	MPC · JPL

== 317901–318000 ==
back to top

Designation			Discovery			Properties		Ref
Permanent	Provisional	Named after	Date	Site	Discoverer(s)	Category	Diam.	Ref
317901	2003 UM_{223}	—	October 22, 2003	Socorro	LINEAR	·	1.4 km	MPC · JPL
317902	2003 UU_{230}	—	October 23, 2003	Kitt Peak	Spacewatch	·	1.3 km	MPC · JPL
317903	2003 UP_{236}	—	October 23, 2003	Anderson Mesa	LONEOS	NYS	1.5 km	MPC · JPL
317904	2003 UO_{240}	—	October 24, 2003	Kitt Peak	Spacewatch	·	1.5 km	MPC · JPL
317905	2003 UM_{249}	—	October 25, 2003	Socorro	LINEAR	NEM	3.2 km	MPC · JPL
317906	2003 UW_{257}	—	October 25, 2003	Socorro	LINEAR	MIS	3.3 km	MPC · JPL
317907	2003 UU_{258}	—	October 25, 2003	Socorro	LINEAR	·	1.6 km	MPC · JPL
317908	2003 UG_{261}	—	October 26, 2003	Kitt Peak	Spacewatch	·	1.4 km	MPC · JPL
317909	2003 UN_{265}	—	October 27, 2003	Kitt Peak	Spacewatch	·	3.3 km	MPC · JPL
317910	2003 UN_{269}	—	October 29, 2003	Catalina	CSS	NYS	1.1 km	MPC · JPL
317911	2003 UO_{278}	—	October 25, 2003	Socorro	LINEAR	AGN	1.5 km	MPC · JPL
317912	2003 UP_{279}	—	October 27, 2003	Socorro	LINEAR	V	790 m	MPC · JPL
317913	2003 UA_{288}	—	October 23, 2003	Kitt Peak	M. W. Buie	·	1.1 km	MPC · JPL
317914	2003 UA_{291}	—	October 23, 2003	Kitt Peak	Spacewatch	MAS	780 m	MPC · JPL
317915	2003 UW_{303}	—	October 17, 2003	Kitt Peak	Spacewatch	·	1.3 km	MPC · JPL
317916	2003 UL_{307}	—	October 18, 2003	Kitt Peak	Spacewatch	·	980 m	MPC · JPL
317917 Jodelle	2003 UH_{313}	Jodelle	October 21, 2003	Saint-Sulpice	Saint-Sulpice	HYG	2.8 km	MPC · JPL
317918	2003 UF_{323}	—	October 16, 2003	Kitt Peak	Spacewatch	·	4.9 km	MPC · JPL
317919	2003 US_{325}	—	October 17, 2003	Apache Point	SDSS	URS	3.5 km	MPC · JPL
317920	2003 UJ_{328}	—	October 17, 2003	Apache Point	SDSS	·	4.0 km	MPC · JPL
317921	2003 UM_{333}	—	October 18, 2003	Apache Point	SDSS	MAS	630 m	MPC · JPL
317922	2003 UJ_{337}	—	October 18, 2003	Apache Point	SDSS	VER	4.1 km	MPC · JPL
317923	2003 UJ_{338}	—	September 27, 2003	Kitt Peak	Spacewatch	·	2.8 km	MPC · JPL
317924	2003 UY_{344}	—	October 19, 2003	Apache Point	SDSS	·	3.0 km	MPC · JPL
317925	2003 UE_{345}	—	October 19, 2003	Apache Point	SDSS	·	860 m	MPC · JPL
317926	2003 UH_{347}	—	October 19, 2003	Apache Point	SDSS	·	1.9 km	MPC · JPL
317927	2003 UK_{349}	—	October 19, 2003	Apache Point	SDSS	·	2.8 km	MPC · JPL
317928	2003 UP_{369}	—	October 21, 2003	Kitt Peak	Spacewatch	·	3.1 km	MPC · JPL
317929	2003 US_{374}	—	October 22, 2003	Apache Point	SDSS	VER	4.2 km	MPC · JPL
317930	2003 UW_{388}	—	October 22, 2003	Apache Point	SDSS	·	970 m	MPC · JPL
317931	2003 VW_{1}	—	November 2, 2003	Socorro	LINEAR	·	1.2 km	MPC · JPL
317932	2003 WC_{2}	—	November 16, 2003	Kitt Peak	Spacewatch	MAS	790 m	MPC · JPL
317933	2003 WM_{4}	—	October 27, 2003	Kitt Peak	Spacewatch	·	2.9 km	MPC · JPL
317934	2003 WJ_{11}	—	November 18, 2003	Palomar	NEAT	·	4.5 km	MPC · JPL
317935	2003 WS_{31}	—	November 18, 2003	Palomar	NEAT	EOS	2.9 km	MPC · JPL
317936	2003 WX_{32}	—	November 18, 2003	Palomar	NEAT	·	2.9 km	MPC · JPL
317937	2003 WP_{35}	—	November 19, 2003	Palomar	NEAT	·	1.3 km	MPC · JPL
317938	2003 WC_{47}	—	November 18, 2003	Palomar	NEAT	·	1.7 km	MPC · JPL
317939	2003 WD_{48}	—	October 29, 2003	Anderson Mesa	LONEOS	·	1.2 km	MPC · JPL
317940	2003 WB_{51}	—	November 19, 2003	Kitt Peak	Spacewatch	ERI	1.8 km	MPC · JPL
317941	2003 WF_{54}	—	November 20, 2003	Socorro	LINEAR	·	2.5 km	MPC · JPL
317942	2003 WJ_{57}	—	November 18, 2003	Palomar	NEAT	·	1.2 km	MPC · JPL
317943	2003 WT_{59}	—	November 18, 2003	Kitt Peak	Spacewatch	·	990 m	MPC · JPL
317944	2003 WS_{63}	—	November 19, 2003	Kitt Peak	Spacewatch	·	1.8 km	MPC · JPL
317945	2003 WP_{67}	—	November 19, 2003	Kitt Peak	Spacewatch	·	2.6 km	MPC · JPL
317946	2003 WS_{75}	—	November 19, 2003	Socorro	LINEAR	·	2.8 km	MPC · JPL
317947	2003 WX_{80}	—	November 20, 2003	Socorro	LINEAR	·	1.3 km	MPC · JPL
317948	2003 WU_{84}	—	November 19, 2003	Catalina	CSS	·	1.7 km	MPC · JPL
317949	2003 WO_{93}	—	November 19, 2003	Anderson Mesa	LONEOS	·	3.4 km	MPC · JPL
317950	2003 WO_{113}	—	October 20, 2003	Kitt Peak	Spacewatch	NYS	1.0 km	MPC · JPL
317951	2003 WV_{132}	—	November 21, 2003	Socorro	LINEAR	·	1.1 km	MPC · JPL
317952	2003 WM_{135}	—	November 21, 2003	Socorro	LINEAR	NYS	1.7 km	MPC · JPL
317953	2003 WT_{150}	—	November 24, 2003	Anderson Mesa	LONEOS	·	1.2 km	MPC · JPL
317954	2003 WP_{160}	—	November 30, 2003	Kitt Peak	Spacewatch	·	3.3 km	MPC · JPL
317955	2003 WC_{161}	—	November 30, 2003	Kitt Peak	Spacewatch	KOR	1.6 km	MPC · JPL
317956	2003 WV_{175}	—	November 19, 2003	Kitt Peak	Spacewatch	MAS	730 m	MPC · JPL
317957	2003 WW_{194}	—	November 16, 2003	Apache Point	SDSS	EUN	1.5 km	MPC · JPL
317958	2003 XG	—	December 3, 2003	Socorro	LINEAR	T_{j} (2.98)	5.4 km	MPC · JPL
317959	2003 XA_{15}	—	December 15, 2003	Socorro	LINEAR	PHO	2.2 km	MPC · JPL
317960	2003 XE_{16}	—	December 14, 2003	Palomar	NEAT	EOS	2.8 km	MPC · JPL
317961	2003 YM_{19}	—	November 21, 2003	Socorro	LINEAR	·	1.5 km	MPC · JPL
317962	2003 YU_{21}	—	December 17, 2003	Kitt Peak	Spacewatch	·	1.4 km	MPC · JPL
317963	2003 YM_{36}	—	December 21, 2003	Socorro	LINEAR	H	650 m	MPC · JPL
317964	2003 YZ_{47}	—	December 18, 2003	Socorro	LINEAR	·	2.4 km	MPC · JPL
317965	2003 YQ_{53}	—	December 19, 2003	Socorro	LINEAR	NYS	1.4 km	MPC · JPL
317966	2003 YX_{53}	—	December 19, 2003	Socorro	LINEAR	·	1.4 km	MPC · JPL
317967	2003 YH_{54}	—	December 19, 2003	Kitt Peak	Spacewatch	·	1.5 km	MPC · JPL
317968	2003 YO_{63}	—	December 19, 2003	Socorro	LINEAR	·	1.7 km	MPC · JPL
317969	2003 YG_{67}	—	December 19, 2003	Kitt Peak	Spacewatch	·	1.5 km	MPC · JPL
317970	2003 YQ_{72}	—	December 18, 2003	Socorro	LINEAR	·	1.9 km	MPC · JPL
317971	2003 YC_{78}	—	December 18, 2003	Socorro	LINEAR	·	1.7 km	MPC · JPL
317972	2003 YN_{78}	—	December 18, 2003	Socorro	LINEAR	·	1.6 km	MPC · JPL
317973	2003 YT_{88}	—	December 19, 2003	Kitt Peak	Spacewatch	NYS	1.2 km	MPC · JPL
317974	2003 YD_{111}	—	December 27, 2003	Desert Eagle	W. K. Y. Yeung	MAS	890 m	MPC · JPL
317975	2003 YC_{116}	—	December 27, 2003	Socorro	LINEAR	·	3.5 km	MPC · JPL
317976	2003 YC_{118}	—	December 23, 2003	Socorro	LINEAR	H	630 m	MPC · JPL
317977	2003 YJ_{141}	—	December 28, 2003	Socorro	LINEAR	·	1.8 km	MPC · JPL
317978	2003 YA_{146}	—	December 28, 2003	Socorro	LINEAR	EUN	1.5 km	MPC · JPL
317979	2003 YU_{146}	—	December 28, 2003	Kitt Peak	Spacewatch	·	4.6 km	MPC · JPL
317980	2003 YU_{149}	—	December 29, 2003	Socorro	LINEAR	SYL · CYB	6.1 km	MPC · JPL
317981	2003 YM_{172}	—	December 18, 2003	Kitt Peak	Spacewatch	NYS	1.4 km	MPC · JPL
317982	2004 AV	—	January 12, 2004	Palomar	NEAT	PHO	1.2 km	MPC · JPL
317983	2004 AT_{6}	—	January 15, 2004	Kitt Peak	Spacewatch	EOS	2.8 km	MPC · JPL
317984	2004 BC_{11}	—	January 16, 2004	Palomar	NEAT	·	3.6 km	MPC · JPL
317985	2004 BQ_{16}	—	January 16, 2004	Palomar	NEAT	·	1.5 km	MPC · JPL
317986	2004 BB_{25}	—	January 19, 2004	Kitt Peak	Spacewatch	·	4.7 km	MPC · JPL
317987	2004 BQ_{34}	—	January 19, 2004	Kitt Peak	Spacewatch	·	1.6 km	MPC · JPL
317988	2004 BT_{36}	—	January 19, 2004	Kitt Peak	Spacewatch	V	780 m	MPC · JPL
317989	2004 BT_{49}	—	January 21, 2004	Socorro	LINEAR	·	2.1 km	MPC · JPL
317990	2004 BK_{69}	—	January 26, 2004	Kingsnake	J. V. McClusky	·	1.8 km	MPC · JPL
317991	2004 BD_{71}	—	January 22, 2004	Socorro	LINEAR	EOS	2.6 km	MPC · JPL
317992	2004 BC_{78}	—	January 22, 2004	Socorro	LINEAR	·	2.1 km	MPC · JPL
317993	2004 BO_{116}	—	January 27, 2004	Catalina	CSS	·	1.4 km	MPC · JPL
317994	2004 BS_{116}	—	January 27, 2004	Catalina	CSS	H	780 m	MPC · JPL
317995	2004 BM_{120}	—	January 31, 2004	Socorro	LINEAR	·	1.6 km	MPC · JPL
317996	2004 BH_{136}	—	January 19, 2004	Kitt Peak	Spacewatch	CYB	5.3 km	MPC · JPL
317997	2004 BU_{147}	—	January 16, 2004	Palomar	NEAT	·	1.4 km	MPC · JPL
317998	2004 BK_{148}	—	January 16, 2004	Palomar	NEAT	·	1.6 km	MPC · JPL
317999	2004 BL_{150}	—	January 17, 2004	Palomar	NEAT	·	3.6 km	MPC · JPL
318000	2004 CP_{12}	—	February 11, 2004	Kitt Peak	Spacewatch	AGN	1.7 km	MPC · JPL

back to top

== See also ==
- Meanings of minor-planet names: 317001–318000
