= List of minor planets: 327001–328000 =

The following is a partial list of minor planets, running from minor-planet number 327001 through 328000, inclusive. The primary data for this and other partial lists is based on JPL's "Small-Body Orbital Elements" and data available from the Minor Planet Center. Critical list information is also provided by the MPC, unless otherwise specified from Lowell Observatory. A detailed description of the table's columns and additional sources are given on the main page including a complete list of every page in this series, and a statistical break-up on the dynamical classification of minor planets.

Also see the summary list of all named bodies in numerical and alphabetical order, and the corresponding naming citations for the number range of this particular list. New namings may only be added to this list after official publication, as the preannouncement of names is condemned by the Working Group for Small Bodies Nomenclature of the International Astronomical Union.

| Near-Earth obj. | MBA (inner) | MBA (outer) | Centaur |
| Mars-crosser | MBA (middle) | Jupiter trojan | Trans-Neptunian obj. |
| Unclassified |

== 327001–327100 ==
| Designation | | | Discovery | | | Properties | | Ref |
| Permanent | Provisional | Named after | Date | Site | Discoverer(s) | Category | Diam. | Ref |
|---|---|---|---|---|---|---|---|---|
| 327001 | 2004 RB_{16} | — | September 7, 2004 | Kitt Peak | Spacewatch | EUN | 1.3 km | MPC · JPL |
| 327002 | 2004 RD_{19} | — | September 7, 2004 | Kitt Peak | Spacewatch | · | 2.3 km | MPC · JPL |
| 327003 | 2004 RU_{21} | — | September 7, 2004 | Kitt Peak | Spacewatch | KOR | 1.5 km | MPC · JPL |
| 327004 | 2004 RO_{29} | — | September 7, 2004 | Socorro | LINEAR | · | 2.4 km | MPC · JPL |
| 327005 | 2004 RG_{51} | — | September 8, 2004 | Socorro | LINEAR | · | 1.8 km | MPC · JPL |
| 327006 | 2004 RY_{53} | — | September 8, 2004 | Socorro | LINEAR | GEF | 1.4 km | MPC · JPL |
| 327007 | 2004 RG_{56} | — | September 8, 2004 | Socorro | LINEAR | TIN | 1.1 km | MPC · JPL |
| 327008 | 2004 RY_{56} | — | September 8, 2004 | Socorro | LINEAR | AGN | 1.4 km | MPC · JPL |
| 327009 | 2004 RK_{84} | — | September 10, 2004 | Wrightwood | J. W. Young | BRA | 1.7 km | MPC · JPL |
| 327010 | 2004 RU_{92} | — | September 8, 2004 | Socorro | LINEAR | · | 2.9 km | MPC · JPL |
| 327011 | 2004 RZ_{95} | — | September 8, 2004 | Socorro | LINEAR | · | 2.3 km | MPC · JPL |
| 327012 | 2004 RF_{136} | — | September 7, 2004 | Palomar | NEAT | · | 2.7 km | MPC · JPL |
| 327013 | 2004 RK_{136} | — | September 7, 2004 | Palomar | NEAT | · | 3.3 km | MPC · JPL |
| 327014 | 2004 RO_{141} | — | September 8, 2004 | Socorro | LINEAR | · | 2.2 km | MPC · JPL |
| 327015 | 2004 RU_{147} | — | September 9, 2004 | Socorro | LINEAR | · | 3.5 km | MPC · JPL |
| 327016 | 2004 RR_{163} | — | September 8, 2004 | Palomar | NEAT | T_{j} (2.96) | 2.7 km | MPC · JPL |
| 327017 | 2004 RQ_{181} | — | September 10, 2004 | Socorro | LINEAR | · | 2.0 km | MPC · JPL |
| 327018 | 2004 RC_{199} | — | September 10, 2004 | Socorro | LINEAR | · | 3.4 km | MPC · JPL |
| 327019 | 2004 RU_{204} | — | September 12, 2004 | Kitt Peak | Spacewatch | · | 2.1 km | MPC · JPL |
| 327020 | 2004 RU_{206} | — | September 11, 2004 | Socorro | LINEAR | · | 3.7 km | MPC · JPL |
| 327021 | 2004 RT_{209} | — | September 11, 2004 | Socorro | LINEAR | · | 2.8 km | MPC · JPL |
| 327022 | 2004 RR_{212} | — | September 11, 2004 | Socorro | LINEAR | · | 3.1 km | MPC · JPL |
| 327023 | 2004 RU_{219} | — | September 11, 2004 | Socorro | LINEAR | · | 2.6 km | MPC · JPL |
| 327024 | 2004 RO_{225} | — | September 9, 2004 | Socorro | LINEAR | · | 3.4 km | MPC · JPL |
| 327025 | 2004 RW_{229} | — | September 9, 2004 | Kitt Peak | Spacewatch | · | 1.9 km | MPC · JPL |
| 327026 | 2004 RH_{238} | — | September 10, 2004 | Kitt Peak | Spacewatch | HOF | 3.0 km | MPC · JPL |
| 327027 | 2004 RM_{238} | — | September 10, 2004 | Kitt Peak | Spacewatch | AGN | 1.2 km | MPC · JPL |
| 327028 | 2004 RG_{246} | — | September 10, 2004 | Kitt Peak | Spacewatch | EUN | 1.5 km | MPC · JPL |
| 327029 | 2004 RY_{253} | — | September 6, 2004 | Palomar | NEAT | · | 2.6 km | MPC · JPL |
| 327030 Alanmaclure | 2004 RR_{289} | Alanmaclure | September 12, 2004 | Stony Ridge | Stony Ridge | · | 3.0 km | MPC · JPL |
| 327031 | 2004 RD_{290} | — | September 5, 2004 | Siding Spring | SSS | · | 2.6 km | MPC · JPL |
| 327032 | 2004 RA_{312} | — | September 15, 2004 | Kitt Peak | Spacewatch | · | 2.5 km | MPC · JPL |
| 327033 | 2004 RK_{323} | — | September 13, 2004 | Socorro | LINEAR | · | 2.4 km | MPC · JPL |
| 327034 | 2004 RO_{324} | — | September 13, 2004 | Socorro | LINEAR | · | 2.5 km | MPC · JPL |
| 327035 | 2004 RB_{335} | — | September 15, 2004 | Anderson Mesa | LONEOS | · | 2.8 km | MPC · JPL |
| 327036 | 2004 RN_{345} | — | September 11, 2004 | Kitt Peak | Spacewatch | · | 2.3 km | MPC · JPL |
| 327037 | 2004 RS_{346} | — | September 10, 2004 | Socorro | LINEAR | EUP | 4.2 km | MPC · JPL |
| 327038 | 2004 RV_{346} | — | September 12, 2004 | Kitt Peak | Spacewatch | · | 2.0 km | MPC · JPL |
| 327039 | 2004 RY_{356} | — | September 4, 2004 | Palomar | NEAT | · | 2.6 km | MPC · JPL |
| 327040 | 2004 SV_{4} | — | September 17, 2004 | Kitt Peak | Spacewatch | DOR | 2.6 km | MPC · JPL |
| 327041 | 2004 SY_{21} | — | September 16, 2004 | Kitt Peak | Spacewatch | EUN | 1.5 km | MPC · JPL |
| 327042 | 2004 SM_{23} | — | September 17, 2004 | Kitt Peak | Spacewatch | · | 1.8 km | MPC · JPL |
| 327043 | 2004 SX_{29} | — | September 17, 2004 | Socorro | LINEAR | · | 2.6 km | MPC · JPL |
| 327044 | 2004 SE_{38} | — | September 17, 2004 | Kitt Peak | Spacewatch | AGN | 1.2 km | MPC · JPL |
| 327045 | 2004 SO_{47} | — | September 18, 2004 | Socorro | LINEAR | · | 4.9 km | MPC · JPL |
| 327046 | 2004 SO_{59} | — | September 24, 2004 | Socorro | LINEAR | (18466) | 3.1 km | MPC · JPL |
| 327047 | 2004 TB_{5} | — | October 4, 2004 | Kitt Peak | Spacewatch | · | 3.4 km | MPC · JPL |
| 327048 | 2004 TJ_{23} | — | October 4, 2004 | Kitt Peak | Spacewatch | · | 1.7 km | MPC · JPL |
| 327049 | 2004 TN_{39} | — | October 4, 2004 | Kitt Peak | Spacewatch | · | 2.1 km | MPC · JPL |
| 327050 | 2004 TN_{55} | — | October 4, 2004 | Kitt Peak | Spacewatch | · | 3.8 km | MPC · JPL |
| 327051 | 2004 TW_{55} | — | October 4, 2004 | Kitt Peak | Spacewatch | · | 1.9 km | MPC · JPL |
| 327052 | 2004 TY_{61} | — | October 5, 2004 | Anderson Mesa | LONEOS | · | 2.4 km | MPC · JPL |
| 327053 | 2004 TP_{72} | — | October 6, 2004 | Kitt Peak | Spacewatch | · | 2.0 km | MPC · JPL |
| 327054 | 2004 TT_{85} | — | October 5, 2004 | Kitt Peak | Spacewatch | · | 1.5 km | MPC · JPL |
| 327055 | 2004 TZ_{85} | — | October 5, 2004 | Kitt Peak | Spacewatch | KOR | 1.4 km | MPC · JPL |
| 327056 | 2004 TA_{89} | — | October 5, 2004 | Kitt Peak | Spacewatch | · | 2.2 km | MPC · JPL |
| 327057 | 2004 TX_{144} | — | October 4, 2004 | Kitt Peak | Spacewatch | · | 2.5 km | MPC · JPL |
| 327058 | 2004 TG_{146} | — | October 5, 2004 | Kitt Peak | Spacewatch | GEF | 1.6 km | MPC · JPL |
| 327059 | 2004 TG_{149} | — | September 23, 2004 | Kitt Peak | Spacewatch | · | 1.7 km | MPC · JPL |
| 327060 | 2004 TK_{155} | — | September 23, 2004 | Kitt Peak | Spacewatch | · | 2.8 km | MPC · JPL |
| 327061 | 2004 TS_{157} | — | October 6, 2004 | Kitt Peak | Spacewatch | · | 2.8 km | MPC · JPL |
| 327062 | 2004 TF_{203} | — | October 7, 2004 | Kitt Peak | Spacewatch | · | 4.4 km | MPC · JPL |
| 327063 | 2004 TG_{204} | — | October 7, 2004 | Kitt Peak | Spacewatch | EUP | 4.5 km | MPC · JPL |
| 327064 | 2004 TE_{205} | — | October 7, 2004 | Kitt Peak | Spacewatch | · | 3.8 km | MPC · JPL |
| 327065 | 2004 TA_{206} | — | October 7, 2004 | Kitt Peak | Spacewatch | · | 3.0 km | MPC · JPL |
| 327066 | 2004 TE_{215} | — | October 10, 2004 | Kitt Peak | Spacewatch | · | 1.9 km | MPC · JPL |
| 327067 | 2004 TM_{235} | — | October 8, 2004 | Kitt Peak | Spacewatch | · | 2.3 km | MPC · JPL |
| 327068 | 2004 TS_{296} | — | October 10, 2004 | Kitt Peak | Spacewatch | EOS | 2.0 km | MPC · JPL |
| 327069 | 2004 TY_{305} | — | October 10, 2004 | Socorro | LINEAR | EOS | 2.6 km | MPC · JPL |
| 327070 | 2004 TN_{306} | — | October 10, 2004 | Socorro | LINEAR | · | 2.5 km | MPC · JPL |
| 327071 | 2004 TQ_{356} | — | October 14, 2004 | Anderson Mesa | LONEOS | (18466) | 2.8 km | MPC · JPL |
| 327072 | 2004 TD_{369} | — | October 8, 2004 | Kitt Peak | Spacewatch | · | 3.0 km | MPC · JPL |
| 327073 | 2004 UD_{5} | — | October 18, 2004 | Socorro | LINEAR | · | 2.7 km | MPC · JPL |
| 327074 | 2004 UT_{6} | — | October 20, 2004 | Socorro | LINEAR | LIX | 4.4 km | MPC · JPL |
| 327075 | 2004 VW_{12} | — | November 3, 2004 | Palomar | NEAT | · | 3.7 km | MPC · JPL |
| 327076 | 2004 VO_{13} | — | November 2, 2004 | Palomar | NEAT | · | 2.7 km | MPC · JPL |
| 327077 | 2004 VW_{27} | — | November 5, 2004 | Palomar | NEAT | · | 5.8 km | MPC · JPL |
| 327078 | 2004 VR_{35} | — | November 3, 2004 | Kitt Peak | Spacewatch | EOS | 3.1 km | MPC · JPL |
| 327079 | 2004 VW_{35} | — | November 3, 2004 | Kitt Peak | Spacewatch | · | 4.0 km | MPC · JPL |
| 327080 | 2004 VK_{38} | — | November 4, 2004 | Kitt Peak | Spacewatch | · | 3.1 km | MPC · JPL |
| 327081 | 2004 VV_{42} | — | November 4, 2004 | Kitt Peak | Spacewatch | THM | 2.4 km | MPC · JPL |
| 327082 Tournesol | 2004 VT_{65} | Tournesol | November 10, 2004 | Nogales | M. Ory | · | 2.2 km | MPC · JPL |
| 327083 | 2004 VK_{68} | — | November 10, 2004 | Kitt Peak | Spacewatch | · | 3.3 km | MPC · JPL |
| 327084 | 2004 VS_{86} | — | November 10, 2004 | Kitt Peak | Spacewatch | EOS | 3.1 km | MPC · JPL |
| 327085 | 2004 VF_{89} | — | November 11, 2004 | Kitt Peak | Spacewatch | · | 4.0 km | MPC · JPL |
| 327086 | 2004 WW_{7} | — | November 19, 2004 | Catalina | CSS | · | 4.1 km | MPC · JPL |
| 327087 | 2004 XH_{1} | — | December 1, 2004 | Catalina | CSS | · | 2.0 km | MPC · JPL |
| 327088 | 2004 XE_{8} | — | December 2, 2004 | Palomar | NEAT | · | 4.1 km | MPC · JPL |
| 327089 | 2004 XT_{14} | — | December 10, 2004 | Desert Moon | Stevens, B. L. | · | 2.9 km | MPC · JPL |
| 327090 | 2004 XR_{21} | — | December 8, 2004 | Socorro | LINEAR | · | 5.6 km | MPC · JPL |
| 327091 | 2004 XA_{25} | — | December 9, 2004 | Kitt Peak | Spacewatch | · | 3.6 km | MPC · JPL |
| 327092 | 2004 XB_{25} | — | December 9, 2004 | Kitt Peak | Spacewatch | · | 4.0 km | MPC · JPL |
| 327093 | 2004 XO_{31} | — | December 9, 2004 | Catalina | CSS | LIX | 6.0 km | MPC · JPL |
| 327094 | 2004 XO_{33} | — | December 10, 2004 | Socorro | LINEAR | T_{j} (2.97) · EUP | 4.4 km | MPC · JPL |
| 327095 | 2004 XG_{56} | — | December 10, 2004 | Kitt Peak | Spacewatch | EOS | 2.4 km | MPC · JPL |
| 327096 | 2004 XL_{94} | — | December 11, 2004 | Kitt Peak | Spacewatch | VER | 3.8 km | MPC · JPL |
| 327097 | 2004 XJ_{96} | — | December 11, 2004 | Kitt Peak | Spacewatch | · | 4.5 km | MPC · JPL |
| 327098 | 2004 XM_{140} | — | December 13, 2004 | Kitt Peak | Spacewatch | · | 4.8 km | MPC · JPL |
| 327099 | 2004 XQ_{144} | — | December 13, 2004 | Campo Imperatore | CINEOS | · | 670 m | MPC · JPL |
| 327100 | 2004 XU_{159} | — | December 14, 2004 | Kitt Peak | Spacewatch | EOS | 2.4 km | MPC · JPL |

== 327101–327200 ==
back to top

| Designation | | | Discovery | | | Properties | | Ref |
| Permanent | Provisional | Named after | Date | Site | Discoverer(s) | Category | Diam. | Ref |
|---|---|---|---|---|---|---|---|---|
| 327101 | 2004 XS_{179} | — | December 14, 2004 | Socorro | LINEAR | · | 3.9 km | MPC · JPL |
| 327102 | 2004 XF_{186} | — | December 14, 2004 | Kitt Peak | Spacewatch | · | 530 m | MPC · JPL |
| 327103 | 2005 AT_{12} | — | January 6, 2005 | Socorro | LINEAR | · | 5.5 km | MPC · JPL |
| 327104 | 2005 AH_{48} | — | January 13, 2005 | Kitt Peak | Spacewatch | · | 630 m | MPC · JPL |
| 327105 | 2005 AT_{55} | — | September 28, 2003 | Anderson Mesa | LONEOS | EOS | 2.9 km | MPC · JPL |
| 327106 | 2005 AC_{68} | — | January 13, 2005 | Kitt Peak | Spacewatch | · | 900 m | MPC · JPL |
| 327107 | 2005 AA_{69} | — | December 19, 2004 | Mount Lemmon | Mount Lemmon Survey | · | 4.4 km | MPC · JPL |
| 327108 | 2005 BC_{27} | — | January 20, 2005 | Socorro | LINEAR | T_{j} (2.93) | 5.0 km | MPC · JPL |
| 327109 | 2005 CP_{1} | — | January 16, 2005 | Kitt Peak | Spacewatch | · | 940 m | MPC · JPL |
| 327110 | 2005 CY_{13} | — | December 20, 2004 | Mount Lemmon | Mount Lemmon Survey | · | 920 m | MPC · JPL |
| 327111 | 2005 CH_{44} | — | February 2, 2005 | Kitt Peak | Spacewatch | · | 710 m | MPC · JPL |
| 327112 | 2005 CZ_{46} | — | February 2, 2005 | Kitt Peak | Spacewatch | · | 890 m | MPC · JPL |
| 327113 | 2005 CG_{65} | — | February 9, 2005 | Mount Lemmon | Mount Lemmon Survey | · | 1.0 km | MPC · JPL |
| 327114 | 2005 EV_{7} | — | March 1, 2005 | Kitt Peak | Spacewatch | · | 1.2 km | MPC · JPL |
| 327115 | 2005 EM_{27} | — | March 3, 2005 | Catalina | CSS | · | 920 m | MPC · JPL |
| 327116 | 2005 ES_{55} | — | March 4, 2005 | Kitt Peak | Spacewatch | · | 700 m | MPC · JPL |
| 327117 | 2005 EH_{63} | — | March 4, 2005 | Mount Lemmon | Mount Lemmon Survey | CYB | 3.6 km | MPC · JPL |
| 327118 | 2005 EW_{65} | — | March 4, 2005 | Mount Lemmon | Mount Lemmon Survey | · | 630 m | MPC · JPL |
| 327119 | 2005 EN_{80} | — | March 4, 2005 | Kitt Peak | Spacewatch | · | 3.9 km | MPC · JPL |
| 327120 | 2005 EF_{91} | — | March 8, 2005 | Kitt Peak | Spacewatch | · | 1.1 km | MPC · JPL |
| 327121 | 2005 EB_{115} | — | March 4, 2005 | Kitt Peak | Spacewatch | · | 870 m | MPC · JPL |
| 327122 | 2005 EL_{137} | — | March 9, 2005 | Mount Lemmon | Mount Lemmon Survey | · | 810 m | MPC · JPL |
| 327123 | 2005 EW_{141} | — | March 10, 2005 | Mount Lemmon | Mount Lemmon Survey | · | 670 m | MPC · JPL |
| 327124 | 2005 ER_{144} | — | March 10, 2005 | Mount Lemmon | Mount Lemmon Survey | · | 780 m | MPC · JPL |
| 327125 | 2005 EQ_{145} | — | March 10, 2005 | Mount Lemmon | Mount Lemmon Survey | · | 780 m | MPC · JPL |
| 327126 | 2005 ER_{148} | — | March 10, 2005 | Kitt Peak | Spacewatch | · | 860 m | MPC · JPL |
| 327127 | 2005 EY_{148} | — | March 10, 2005 | Kitt Peak | Spacewatch | · | 880 m | MPC · JPL |
| 327128 | 2005 EM_{150} | — | March 10, 2005 | Kitt Peak | Spacewatch | · | 940 m | MPC · JPL |
| 327129 | 2005 EW_{150} | — | March 10, 2005 | Kitt Peak | Spacewatch | · | 840 m | MPC · JPL |
| 327130 | 2005 EL_{151} | — | March 10, 2005 | Kitt Peak | Spacewatch | · | 750 m | MPC · JPL |
| 327131 | 2005 EO_{164} | — | March 11, 2005 | Catalina | CSS | · | 1 km | MPC · JPL |
| 327132 | 2005 EJ_{181} | — | March 9, 2005 | Anderson Mesa | LONEOS | · | 840 m | MPC · JPL |
| 327133 | 2005 EB_{185} | — | March 9, 2005 | Kitt Peak | Spacewatch | · | 790 m | MPC · JPL |
| 327134 | 2005 EN_{186} | — | March 10, 2005 | Anderson Mesa | LONEOS | · | 810 m | MPC · JPL |
| 327135 | 2005 EA_{195} | — | March 11, 2005 | Mount Lemmon | Mount Lemmon Survey | · | 770 m | MPC · JPL |
| 327136 | 2005 EV_{195} | — | March 11, 2005 | Mount Lemmon | Mount Lemmon Survey | · | 1.1 km | MPC · JPL |
| 327137 | 2005 EV_{206} | — | March 13, 2005 | Kitt Peak | Spacewatch | · | 660 m | MPC · JPL |
| 327138 | 2005 EJ_{213} | — | March 4, 2005 | Mount Lemmon | Mount Lemmon Survey | · | 660 m | MPC · JPL |
| 327139 | 2005 ES_{213} | — | March 4, 2005 | Mount Lemmon | Mount Lemmon Survey | · | 850 m | MPC · JPL |
| 327140 | 2005 EE_{224} | — | March 15, 2005 | Mount Lemmon | Mount Lemmon Survey | AMO · critical | 370 m | MPC · JPL |
| 327141 | 2005 EC_{249} | — | March 13, 2005 | Kitt Peak | Spacewatch | · | 810 m | MPC · JPL |
| 327142 | 2005 EJ_{257} | — | March 11, 2005 | Mount Lemmon | Mount Lemmon Survey | · | 780 m | MPC · JPL |
| 327143 | 2005 ET_{262} | — | March 13, 2005 | Kitt Peak | Spacewatch | · | 770 m | MPC · JPL |
| 327144 | 2005 EW_{264} | — | March 13, 2005 | Kitt Peak | Spacewatch | · | 750 m | MPC · JPL |
| 327145 | 2005 GB_{9} | — | April 1, 2005 | Kitt Peak | Spacewatch | · | 1.0 km | MPC · JPL |
| 327146 | 2005 GA_{26} | — | April 2, 2005 | Mount Lemmon | Mount Lemmon Survey | · | 930 m | MPC · JPL |
| 327147 | 2005 GM_{33} | — | April 4, 2005 | Socorro | LINEAR | PHO | 930 m | MPC · JPL |
| 327148 | 2005 GF_{45} | — | April 5, 2005 | Palomar | NEAT | · | 1 km | MPC · JPL |
| 327149 | 2005 GW_{48} | — | April 5, 2005 | Mount Lemmon | Mount Lemmon Survey | · | 770 m | MPC · JPL |
| 327150 | 2005 GS_{57} | — | March 13, 2005 | Mount Lemmon | Mount Lemmon Survey | (2076) | 870 m | MPC · JPL |
| 327151 | 2005 GX_{71} | — | April 4, 2005 | Mount Lemmon | Mount Lemmon Survey | · | 670 m | MPC · JPL |
| 327152 | 2005 GM_{84} | — | April 4, 2005 | Mount Lemmon | Mount Lemmon Survey | · | 870 m | MPC · JPL |
| 327153 | 2005 GO_{84} | — | April 4, 2005 | Kitt Peak | Spacewatch | PHO | 1.2 km | MPC · JPL |
| 327154 | 2005 GW_{96} | — | April 6, 2005 | Mount Lemmon | Mount Lemmon Survey | · | 1.2 km | MPC · JPL |
| 327155 | 2005 GJ_{100} | — | April 9, 2005 | Mount Lemmon | Mount Lemmon Survey | · | 840 m | MPC · JPL |
| 327156 | 2005 GT_{113} | — | April 9, 2005 | Socorro | LINEAR | · | 940 m | MPC · JPL |
| 327157 | 2005 GP_{126} | — | April 11, 2005 | Mount Lemmon | Mount Lemmon Survey | V | 700 m | MPC · JPL |
| 327158 | 2005 GK_{127} | — | April 12, 2005 | Anderson Mesa | LONEOS | PHO | 1.2 km | MPC · JPL |
| 327159 | 2005 GO_{163} | — | April 10, 2005 | Mount Lemmon | Mount Lemmon Survey | · | 790 m | MPC · JPL |
| 327160 | 2005 GF_{167} | — | April 11, 2005 | Mount Lemmon | Mount Lemmon Survey | · | 1.2 km | MPC · JPL |
| 327161 | 2005 HZ | — | April 16, 2005 | Kitt Peak | Spacewatch | · | 630 m | MPC · JPL |
| 327162 | 2005 HJ_{5} | — | April 30, 2005 | Kitt Peak | Spacewatch | · | 1.2 km | MPC · JPL |
| 327163 | 2005 JC_{2} | — | May 2, 2005 | Kitt Peak | Spacewatch | PHO | 870 m | MPC · JPL |
| 327164 | 2005 JX_{2} | — | May 3, 2005 | Kitt Peak | Spacewatch | · | 1.1 km | MPC · JPL |
| 327165 | 2005 JC_{16} | — | May 3, 2005 | Socorro | LINEAR | · | 1.3 km | MPC · JPL |
| 327166 | 2005 JR_{38} | — | May 7, 2005 | Kitt Peak | Spacewatch | MAS | 770 m | MPC · JPL |
| 327167 | 2005 JM_{47} | — | May 3, 2005 | Kitt Peak | Spacewatch | NYS | 770 m | MPC · JPL |
| 327168 | 2005 JG_{59} | — | May 8, 2005 | Anderson Mesa | LONEOS | · | 890 m | MPC · JPL |
| 327169 | 2005 JE_{81} | — | May 11, 2005 | Palomar | NEAT | PHO | 1.2 km | MPC · JPL |
| 327170 | 2005 JM_{84} | — | May 8, 2005 | Mount Lemmon | Mount Lemmon Survey | V | 540 m | MPC · JPL |
| 327171 | 2005 JN_{85} | — | May 8, 2005 | Mount Lemmon | Mount Lemmon Survey | · | 960 m | MPC · JPL |
| 327172 | 2005 JC_{89} | — | May 11, 2005 | Anderson Mesa | LONEOS | · | 960 m | MPC · JPL |
| 327173 | 2005 JQ_{105} | — | May 11, 2005 | Mount Lemmon | Mount Lemmon Survey | · | 1.2 km | MPC · JPL |
| 327174 | 2005 JJ_{120} | — | May 10, 2005 | Kitt Peak | Spacewatch | · | 1.2 km | MPC · JPL |
| 327175 | 2005 JJ_{121} | — | May 10, 2005 | Kitt Peak | Spacewatch | · | 1.2 km | MPC · JPL |
| 327176 | 2005 JP_{127} | — | May 12, 2005 | Socorro | LINEAR | NYS | 1.1 km | MPC · JPL |
| 327177 | 2005 JJ_{185} | — | May 14, 2005 | Mount Lemmon | Mount Lemmon Survey | NYS | 930 m | MPC · JPL |
| 327178 | 2005 KD_{8} | — | May 20, 2005 | Mount Lemmon | Mount Lemmon Survey | · | 1.3 km | MPC · JPL |
| 327179 | 2005 KF_{13} | — | May 19, 2005 | Mount Lemmon | Mount Lemmon Survey | NYS | 1.5 km | MPC · JPL |
| 327180 | 2005 LH_{5} | — | June 2, 2005 | Catalina | CSS | V | 750 m | MPC · JPL |
| 327181 | 2005 LH_{23} | — | June 8, 2005 | Kitt Peak | Spacewatch | · | 1.8 km | MPC · JPL |
| 327182 | 2005 LN_{26} | — | June 8, 2005 | Kitt Peak | Spacewatch | V | 690 m | MPC · JPL |
| 327183 | 2005 LF_{32} | — | May 13, 2005 | Kitt Peak | Spacewatch | · | 1.2 km | MPC · JPL |
| 327184 | 2005 LF_{40} | — | June 13, 2005 | Mount Lemmon | Mount Lemmon Survey | NYS | 940 m | MPC · JPL |
| 327185 | 2005 LZ_{41} | — | June 13, 2005 | Mount Lemmon | Mount Lemmon Survey | · | 920 m | MPC · JPL |
| 327186 | 2005 LC_{42} | — | June 13, 2005 | Mount Lemmon | Mount Lemmon Survey | NYS | 1.6 km | MPC · JPL |
| 327187 | 2005 LF_{53} | — | June 13, 2005 | Mount Lemmon | Mount Lemmon Survey | NYS | 1.3 km | MPC · JPL |
| 327188 | 2005 MQ_{5} | — | June 27, 2005 | Junk Bond | D. Healy | · | 1.6 km | MPC · JPL |
| 327189 | 2005 MA_{7} | — | June 27, 2005 | Mount Lemmon | Mount Lemmon Survey | V | 780 m | MPC · JPL |
| 327190 | 2005 MY_{7} | — | June 27, 2005 | Kitt Peak | Spacewatch | · | 1.5 km | MPC · JPL |
| 327191 | 2005 MD_{12} | — | June 28, 2005 | Palomar | NEAT | MAS | 750 m | MPC · JPL |
| 327192 | 2005 MH_{22} | — | June 30, 2005 | Kitt Peak | Spacewatch | · | 1.6 km | MPC · JPL |
| 327193 | 2005 MQ_{28} | — | June 29, 2005 | Kitt Peak | Spacewatch | · | 1.7 km | MPC · JPL |
| 327194 | 2005 MG_{30} | — | June 29, 2005 | Kitt Peak | Spacewatch | · | 1.3 km | MPC · JPL |
| 327195 | 2005 MU_{30} | — | June 29, 2005 | Palomar | NEAT | · | 1.3 km | MPC · JPL |
| 327196 | 2005 MR_{33} | — | June 29, 2005 | Kitt Peak | Spacewatch | · | 1.2 km | MPC · JPL |
| 327197 | 2005 MC_{39} | — | June 30, 2005 | Kitt Peak | Spacewatch | · | 1.1 km | MPC · JPL |
| 327198 | 2005 MA_{54} | — | June 20, 2005 | Palomar | NEAT | · | 1.9 km | MPC · JPL |
| 327199 | 2005 NQ | — | July 2, 2005 | Kitt Peak | Spacewatch | · | 1.1 km | MPC · JPL |
| 327200 | 2005 NV_{7} | — | July 1, 2005 | Kitt Peak | Spacewatch | · | 1.5 km | MPC · JPL |

== 327201–327300 ==
back to top

| Designation | | | Discovery | | | Properties | | Ref |
| Permanent | Provisional | Named after | Date | Site | Discoverer(s) | Category | Diam. | Ref |
|---|---|---|---|---|---|---|---|---|
| 327201 | 2005 NW_{15} | — | July 2, 2005 | Kitt Peak | Spacewatch | NYS | 1.5 km | MPC · JPL |
| 327202 | 2005 NN_{40} | — | July 3, 2005 | Mount Lemmon | Mount Lemmon Survey | MAS | 900 m | MPC · JPL |
| 327203 | 2005 NX_{40} | — | July 3, 2005 | Mount Lemmon | Mount Lemmon Survey | MAS | 800 m | MPC · JPL |
| 327204 | 2005 NB_{46} | — | July 5, 2005 | Mount Lemmon | Mount Lemmon Survey | MAS | 770 m | MPC · JPL |
| 327205 | 2005 NU_{48} | — | July 10, 2005 | Catalina | CSS | · | 1.8 km | MPC · JPL |
| 327206 | 2005 NQ_{66} | — | July 2, 2005 | Kitt Peak | Spacewatch | · | 1.2 km | MPC · JPL |
| 327207 | 2005 NF_{70} | — | July 4, 2005 | Palomar | NEAT | MAS | 770 m | MPC · JPL |
| 327208 | 2005 NB_{82} | — | July 15, 2005 | Kitt Peak | Spacewatch | · | 1.4 km | MPC · JPL |
| 327209 | 2005 NA_{91} | — | July 5, 2005 | Mount Lemmon | Mount Lemmon Survey | V | 780 m | MPC · JPL |
| 327210 | 2005 NH_{101} | — | July 11, 2005 | Kitt Peak | Spacewatch | MAS | 780 m | MPC · JPL |
| 327211 | 2005 NQ_{124} | — | July 4, 2005 | Palomar | NEAT | · | 930 m | MPC · JPL |
| 327212 | 2005 NY_{124} | — | July 4, 2005 | Campo Imperatore | CINEOS | · | 1.8 km | MPC · JPL |
| 327213 | 2005 NT_{125} | — | July 10, 2005 | Siding Spring | SSS | · | 1.8 km | MPC · JPL |
| 327214 | 2005 ON_{2} | — | July 26, 2005 | Palomar | NEAT | · | 1.6 km | MPC · JPL |
| 327215 | 2005 OC_{17} | — | July 30, 2005 | Palomar | NEAT | PHO | 970 m | MPC · JPL |
| 327216 | 2005 OX_{17} | — | July 30, 2005 | Palomar | NEAT | · | 1.2 km | MPC · JPL |
| 327217 | 2005 OD_{25} | — | July 31, 2005 | Palomar | NEAT | · | 1.4 km | MPC · JPL |
| 327218 | 2005 OM_{28} | — | July 30, 2005 | Palomar | NEAT | · | 1.1 km | MPC · JPL |
| 327219 | 2005 PN_{23} | — | August 6, 2005 | Palomar | NEAT | · | 1.8 km | MPC · JPL |
| 327220 | 2005 QO | — | August 22, 2005 | Haleakala | NEAT | · | 1.6 km | MPC · JPL |
| 327221 | 2005 QS_{26} | — | August 27, 2005 | Kitt Peak | Spacewatch | · | 1.6 km | MPC · JPL |
| 327222 | 2005 QC_{28} | — | August 27, 2005 | Kanab | Sheridan, E. | NYS | 1.4 km | MPC · JPL |
| 327223 | 2005 QW_{61} | — | August 26, 2005 | Palomar | NEAT | · | 1.6 km | MPC · JPL |
| 327224 | 2005 QN_{90} | — | August 25, 2005 | Palomar | NEAT | · | 1.7 km | MPC · JPL |
| 327225 | 2005 QD_{100} | — | August 27, 2005 | Palomar | NEAT | MAR | 990 m | MPC · JPL |
| 327226 | 2005 QQ_{100} | — | August 27, 2005 | Palomar | NEAT | · | 1.4 km | MPC · JPL |
| 327227 | 2005 QH_{108} | — | August 27, 2005 | Palomar | NEAT | · | 1.5 km | MPC · JPL |
| 327228 | 2005 QO_{112} | — | August 27, 2005 | Palomar | NEAT | · | 1.2 km | MPC · JPL |
| 327229 | 2005 QO_{120} | — | August 28, 2005 | Kitt Peak | Spacewatch | MAS | 760 m | MPC · JPL |
| 327230 | 2005 QD_{160} | — | August 28, 2005 | Anderson Mesa | LONEOS | · | 2.5 km | MPC · JPL |
| 327231 | 2005 QO_{167} | — | August 27, 2005 | Anderson Mesa | LONEOS | · | 1.4 km | MPC · JPL |
| 327232 | 2005 QH_{182} | — | August 31, 2005 | Kitt Peak | Spacewatch | · | 2.4 km | MPC · JPL |
| 327233 | 2005 QT_{187} | — | August 27, 2005 | Palomar | NEAT | NYS | 1.1 km | MPC · JPL |
| 327234 | 2005 RL_{12} | — | September 1, 2005 | Kitt Peak | Spacewatch | · | 1.5 km | MPC · JPL |
| 327235 | 2005 RN_{21} | — | September 6, 2005 | Anderson Mesa | LONEOS | · | 1.8 km | MPC · JPL |
| 327236 | 2005 RG_{46} | — | September 14, 2005 | Apache Point | A. C. Becker | RAF | 880 m | MPC · JPL |
| 327237 | 2005 RK_{46} | — | September 15, 2005 | Apache Point | SDSS Collaboration | · | 1.9 km | MPC · JPL |
| 327238 | 2005 RG_{47} | — | September 14, 2005 | Apache Point | A. C. Becker | · | 2.8 km | MPC · JPL |
| 327239 | 2005 SN_{18} | — | September 26, 2005 | Kitt Peak | Spacewatch | · | 2.1 km | MPC · JPL |
| 327240 | 2005 SO_{20} | — | September 24, 2005 | Kitt Peak | Spacewatch | · | 2.2 km | MPC · JPL |
| 327241 | 2005 SQ_{21} | — | September 27, 2005 | Palomar | NEAT | · | 2.0 km | MPC · JPL |
| 327242 | 2005 SY_{28} | — | September 23, 2005 | Kitt Peak | Spacewatch | · | 2.5 km | MPC · JPL |
| 327243 | 2005 SQ_{32} | — | September 23, 2005 | Kitt Peak | Spacewatch | · | 1.3 km | MPC · JPL |
| 327244 | 2005 SN_{43} | — | September 24, 2005 | Kitt Peak | Spacewatch | · | 1.1 km | MPC · JPL |
| 327245 | 2005 SC_{45} | — | September 24, 2005 | Kitt Peak | Spacewatch | · | 1.2 km | MPC · JPL |
| 327246 | 2005 SQ_{45} | — | September 24, 2005 | Kitt Peak | Spacewatch | · | 1.8 km | MPC · JPL |
| 327247 | 2005 SZ_{46} | — | September 24, 2005 | Kitt Peak | Spacewatch | · | 1.7 km | MPC · JPL |
| 327248 | 2005 SS_{53} | — | September 25, 2005 | Catalina | CSS | EUN | 1.4 km | MPC · JPL |
| 327249 | 2005 SO_{72} | — | August 31, 2005 | Palomar | NEAT | · | 2.1 km | MPC · JPL |
| 327250 | 2005 SG_{94} | — | September 25, 2005 | Kitt Peak | Spacewatch | EUN | 1.3 km | MPC · JPL |
| 327251 | 2005 SG_{97} | — | September 25, 2005 | Palomar | NEAT | · | 2.3 km | MPC · JPL |
| 327252 | 2005 SP_{98} | — | September 25, 2005 | Kitt Peak | Spacewatch | · | 2.4 km | MPC · JPL |
| 327253 | 2005 SD_{102} | — | September 25, 2005 | Kitt Peak | Spacewatch | · | 1.7 km | MPC · JPL |
| 327254 | 2005 SB_{106} | — | September 25, 2005 | Kitt Peak | Spacewatch | · | 2.4 km | MPC · JPL |
| 327255 | 2005 SF_{108} | — | September 26, 2005 | Kitt Peak | Spacewatch | · | 1.4 km | MPC · JPL |
| 327256 | 2005 SM_{116} | — | September 27, 2005 | Palomar | NEAT | H | 500 m | MPC · JPL |
| 327257 | 2005 SV_{118} | — | September 28, 2005 | Palomar | NEAT | KON | 2.6 km | MPC · JPL |
| 327258 | 2005 SA_{119} | — | September 28, 2005 | Palomar | NEAT | · | 1.4 km | MPC · JPL |
| 327259 | 2005 SJ_{120} | — | September 29, 2005 | Kitt Peak | Spacewatch | · | 1.9 km | MPC · JPL |
| 327260 | 2005 SD_{122} | — | September 29, 2005 | Kitt Peak | Spacewatch | · | 1.5 km | MPC · JPL |
| 327261 | 2005 SA_{126} | — | September 29, 2005 | Palomar | NEAT | H | 590 m | MPC · JPL |
| 327262 | 2005 SJ_{133} | — | September 29, 2005 | Kitt Peak | Spacewatch | NEM | 2.6 km | MPC · JPL |
| 327263 | 2005 SM_{138} | — | September 25, 2005 | Kitt Peak | Spacewatch | · | 1.2 km | MPC · JPL |
| 327264 | 2005 ST_{166} | — | September 28, 2005 | Palomar | NEAT | · | 2.7 km | MPC · JPL |
| 327265 | 2005 SG_{168} | — | September 29, 2005 | Kitt Peak | Spacewatch | · | 970 m | MPC · JPL |
| 327266 | 2005 SS_{171} | — | September 29, 2005 | Kitt Peak | Spacewatch | · | 1.3 km | MPC · JPL |
| 327267 | 2005 SR_{179} | — | September 29, 2005 | Anderson Mesa | LONEOS | · | 2.1 km | MPC · JPL |
| 327268 | 2005 SD_{187} | — | September 29, 2005 | Kitt Peak | Spacewatch | · | 1.6 km | MPC · JPL |
| 327269 | 2005 SV_{192} | — | September 29, 2005 | Kitt Peak | Spacewatch | MAR | 1.2 km | MPC · JPL |
| 327270 | 2005 SV_{202} | — | September 30, 2005 | Mount Lemmon | Mount Lemmon Survey | · | 1.1 km | MPC · JPL |
| 327271 | 2005 SJ_{211} | — | September 30, 2005 | Palomar | NEAT | · | 1.6 km | MPC · JPL |
| 327272 | 2005 SY_{211} | — | September 30, 2005 | Mount Lemmon | Mount Lemmon Survey | · | 1.5 km | MPC · JPL |
| 327273 | 2005 SP_{216} | — | September 30, 2005 | Mount Lemmon | Mount Lemmon Survey | · | 1.7 km | MPC · JPL |
| 327274 | 2005 SS_{225} | — | September 29, 2005 | Kitt Peak | Spacewatch | · | 1.9 km | MPC · JPL |
| 327275 | 2005 SS_{233} | — | September 30, 2005 | Mount Lemmon | Mount Lemmon Survey | · | 1.6 km | MPC · JPL |
| 327276 | 2005 SM_{237} | — | September 29, 2005 | Kitt Peak | Spacewatch | · | 1.8 km | MPC · JPL |
| 327277 | 2005 SJ_{247} | — | September 30, 2005 | Kitt Peak | Spacewatch | · | 1.6 km | MPC · JPL |
| 327278 | 2005 ST_{255} | — | September 22, 2005 | Palomar | NEAT | · | 1.9 km | MPC · JPL |
| 327279 | 2005 SD_{265} | — | September 26, 2005 | Kitt Peak | Spacewatch | · | 1.0 km | MPC · JPL |
| 327280 | 2005 SC_{280} | — | September 24, 2005 | Palomar | NEAT | · | 1.7 km | MPC · JPL |
| 327281 | 2005 ST_{291} | — | September 26, 2005 | Kitt Peak | Spacewatch | MAR | 1.2 km | MPC · JPL |
| 327282 | 2005 TR_{9} | — | October 1, 2005 | Catalina | CSS | · | 2.0 km | MPC · JPL |
| 327283 | 2005 TL_{15} | — | October 3, 2005 | Kitt Peak | Spacewatch | H | 440 m | MPC · JPL |
| 327284 | 2005 TC_{33} | — | October 1, 2005 | Kitt Peak | Spacewatch | · | 1.8 km | MPC · JPL |
| 327285 | 2005 TT_{42} | — | October 4, 2005 | Palomar | NEAT | · | 1.9 km | MPC · JPL |
| 327286 | 2005 TQ_{46} | — | October 1, 2005 | Pla D'Arguines | R. Ferrando | H | 640 m | MPC · JPL |
| 327287 | 2005 TE_{55} | — | October 5, 2005 | Kitt Peak | Spacewatch | · | 1.7 km | MPC · JPL |
| 327288 | 2005 TE_{64} | — | October 6, 2005 | Catalina | CSS | · | 2.4 km | MPC · JPL |
| 327289 | 2005 TO_{77} | — | October 6, 2005 | Catalina | CSS | · | 3.0 km | MPC · JPL |
| 327290 | 2005 TN_{97} | — | October 6, 2005 | Mount Lemmon | Mount Lemmon Survey | · | 2.3 km | MPC · JPL |
| 327291 | 2005 TV_{101} | — | October 7, 2005 | Anderson Mesa | LONEOS | · | 2.6 km | MPC · JPL |
| 327292 | 2005 TJ_{104} | — | October 8, 2005 | Socorro | LINEAR | · | 1.9 km | MPC · JPL |
| 327293 | 2005 TG_{116} | — | October 7, 2005 | Kitt Peak | Spacewatch | · | 1.4 km | MPC · JPL |
| 327294 | 2005 TJ_{116} | — | October 7, 2005 | Kitt Peak | Spacewatch | · | 1.5 km | MPC · JPL |
| 327295 | 2005 TS_{120} | — | October 7, 2005 | Kitt Peak | Spacewatch | · | 1.4 km | MPC · JPL |
| 327296 | 2005 TX_{120} | — | October 7, 2005 | Kitt Peak | Spacewatch | · | 1.3 km | MPC · JPL |
| 327297 | 2005 TF_{121} | — | October 7, 2005 | Kitt Peak | Spacewatch | · | 1.5 km | MPC · JPL |
| 327298 | 2005 TX_{138} | — | September 29, 2005 | Kitt Peak | Spacewatch | · | 1.6 km | MPC · JPL |
| 327299 | 2005 TB_{141} | — | October 8, 2005 | Kitt Peak | Spacewatch | · | 1.6 km | MPC · JPL |
| 327300 | 2005 TK_{141} | — | October 8, 2005 | Kitt Peak | Spacewatch | · | 1.8 km | MPC · JPL |

== 327301–327400 ==
back to top

| Designation | | | Discovery | | | Properties | | Ref |
| Permanent | Provisional | Named after | Date | Site | Discoverer(s) | Category | Diam. | Ref |
|---|---|---|---|---|---|---|---|---|
| 327301 | 2005 TP_{144} | — | October 8, 2005 | Kitt Peak | Spacewatch | · | 1.8 km | MPC · JPL |
| 327302 | 2005 TJ_{146} | — | September 29, 2005 | Kitt Peak | Spacewatch | · | 1.8 km | MPC · JPL |
| 327303 | 2005 TW_{154} | — | October 9, 2005 | Kitt Peak | Spacewatch | · | 1.5 km | MPC · JPL |
| 327304 | 2005 TV_{166} | — | October 9, 2005 | Kitt Peak | Spacewatch | (12739) | 1.5 km | MPC · JPL |
| 327305 | 2005 TK_{178} | — | October 1, 2005 | Catalina | CSS | · | 1.7 km | MPC · JPL |
| 327306 | 2005 TD_{193} | — | October 11, 2005 | Apache Point | A. C. Becker | · | 1.9 km | MPC · JPL |
| 327307 | 2005 UK_{7} | — | October 28, 2005 | Socorro | LINEAR | H | 640 m | MPC · JPL |
| 327308 | 2005 UL_{10} | — | October 21, 2005 | Palomar | NEAT | EUN | 1.4 km | MPC · JPL |
| 327309 | 2005 UV_{13} | — | October 22, 2005 | Kitt Peak | Spacewatch | · | 1.5 km | MPC · JPL |
| 327310 | 2005 UR_{14} | — | October 22, 2005 | Kitt Peak | Spacewatch | · | 1.8 km | MPC · JPL |
| 327311 | 2005 UZ_{14} | — | October 22, 2005 | Kitt Peak | Spacewatch | · | 1.2 km | MPC · JPL |
| 327312 | 2005 UB_{18} | — | October 22, 2005 | Catalina | CSS | · | 1.8 km | MPC · JPL |
| 327313 | 2005 UL_{21} | — | October 23, 2005 | Kitt Peak | Spacewatch | · | 1.8 km | MPC · JPL |
| 327314 | 2005 UE_{27} | — | October 23, 2005 | Catalina | CSS | · | 1.7 km | MPC · JPL |
| 327315 | 2005 UA_{28} | — | October 23, 2005 | Kitt Peak | Spacewatch | NEM | 2.0 km | MPC · JPL |
| 327316 | 2005 UK_{31} | — | October 24, 2005 | Kitt Peak | Spacewatch | · | 800 m | MPC · JPL |
| 327317 | 2005 UA_{35} | — | October 24, 2005 | Kitt Peak | Spacewatch | · | 2.0 km | MPC · JPL |
| 327318 | 2005 UF_{40} | — | October 24, 2005 | Kitt Peak | Spacewatch | · | 1.9 km | MPC · JPL |
| 327319 | 2005 UW_{42} | — | October 22, 2005 | Kitt Peak | Spacewatch | · | 2.0 km | MPC · JPL |
| 327320 | 2005 UU_{43} | — | October 22, 2005 | Kitt Peak | Spacewatch | · | 2.6 km | MPC · JPL |
| 327321 | 2005 UG_{44} | — | October 22, 2005 | Kitt Peak | Spacewatch | · | 2.8 km | MPC · JPL |
| 327322 | 2005 UO_{53} | — | October 23, 2005 | Catalina | CSS | · | 1.7 km | MPC · JPL |
| 327323 | 2005 UM_{78} | — | September 29, 2005 | Mount Lemmon | Mount Lemmon Survey | · | 1.3 km | MPC · JPL |
| 327324 | 2005 UL_{81} | — | October 26, 2005 | Anderson Mesa | LONEOS | · | 2.0 km | MPC · JPL |
| 327325 | 2005 UO_{84} | — | October 22, 2005 | Kitt Peak | Spacewatch | · | 1.6 km | MPC · JPL |
| 327326 | 2005 UJ_{90} | — | October 22, 2005 | Kitt Peak | Spacewatch | · | 2.1 km | MPC · JPL |
| 327327 | 2005 UP_{94} | — | October 22, 2005 | Kitt Peak | Spacewatch | · | 1.6 km | MPC · JPL |
| 327328 | 2005 UH_{100} | — | October 22, 2005 | Kitt Peak | Spacewatch | · | 2.0 km | MPC · JPL |
| 327329 | 2005 UY_{101} | — | October 22, 2005 | Kitt Peak | Spacewatch | · | 2.7 km | MPC · JPL |
| 327330 | 2005 UU_{110} | — | October 22, 2005 | Kitt Peak | Spacewatch | · | 2.2 km | MPC · JPL |
| 327331 | 2005 UN_{120} | — | October 24, 2005 | Kitt Peak | Spacewatch | MRX | 1.2 km | MPC · JPL |
| 327332 | 2005 UX_{126} | — | October 24, 2005 | Kitt Peak | Spacewatch | · | 1.7 km | MPC · JPL |
| 327333 | 2005 UB_{128} | — | October 24, 2005 | Kitt Peak | Spacewatch | (5) | 1.3 km | MPC · JPL |
| 327334 | 2005 UV_{133} | — | October 25, 2005 | Kitt Peak | Spacewatch | · | 1.7 km | MPC · JPL |
| 327335 | 2005 UW_{141} | — | October 25, 2005 | Catalina | CSS | · | 2.7 km | MPC · JPL |
| 327336 | 2005 UJ_{142} | — | October 25, 2005 | Catalina | CSS | · | 1.5 km | MPC · JPL |
| 327337 | 2005 UN_{154} | — | October 26, 2005 | Kitt Peak | Spacewatch | (5) | 1.6 km | MPC · JPL |
| 327338 | 2005 UY_{160} | — | October 22, 2005 | Catalina | CSS | · | 2.9 km | MPC · JPL |
| 327339 | 2005 UP_{165} | — | September 30, 2005 | Mount Lemmon | Mount Lemmon Survey | · | 1.5 km | MPC · JPL |
| 327340 | 2005 UP_{169} | — | October 24, 2005 | Kitt Peak | Spacewatch | (5) | 1.1 km | MPC · JPL |
| 327341 | 2005 UR_{173} | — | October 24, 2005 | Kitt Peak | Spacewatch | · | 1.7 km | MPC · JPL |
| 327342 | 2005 US_{177} | — | October 24, 2005 | Kitt Peak | Spacewatch | · | 2.8 km | MPC · JPL |
| 327343 | 2005 UZ_{185} | — | October 25, 2005 | Mount Lemmon | Mount Lemmon Survey | · | 1.7 km | MPC · JPL |
| 327344 | 2005 UE_{186} | — | October 25, 2005 | Mount Lemmon | Mount Lemmon Survey | (7744) | 1.6 km | MPC · JPL |
| 327345 | 2005 UB_{189} | — | October 27, 2005 | Mount Lemmon | Mount Lemmon Survey | NEM | 2.4 km | MPC · JPL |
| 327346 | 2005 UZ_{190} | — | October 27, 2005 | Mount Lemmon | Mount Lemmon Survey | · | 1.7 km | MPC · JPL |
| 327347 | 2005 UG_{195} | — | October 22, 2005 | Kitt Peak | Spacewatch | HOF | 2.7 km | MPC · JPL |
| 327348 | 2005 UA_{199} | — | October 25, 2005 | Kitt Peak | Spacewatch | · | 1.5 km | MPC · JPL |
| 327349 | 2005 UT_{203} | — | October 1, 2005 | Mount Lemmon | Mount Lemmon Survey | · | 1.8 km | MPC · JPL |
| 327350 | 2005 UD_{205} | — | October 26, 2005 | Anderson Mesa | LONEOS | EUN | 1.7 km | MPC · JPL |
| 327351 | 2005 UH_{227} | — | October 25, 2005 | Kitt Peak | Spacewatch | · | 920 m | MPC · JPL |
| 327352 | 2005 UQ_{227} | — | October 25, 2005 | Kitt Peak | Spacewatch | (11882) | 1.9 km | MPC · JPL |
| 327353 | 2005 UR_{228} | — | October 25, 2005 | Kitt Peak | Spacewatch | · | 1.5 km | MPC · JPL |
| 327354 | 2005 US_{231} | — | October 25, 2005 | Mount Lemmon | Mount Lemmon Survey | · | 2.1 km | MPC · JPL |
| 327355 | 2005 UH_{235} | — | October 25, 2005 | Kitt Peak | Spacewatch | HOF | 2.7 km | MPC · JPL |
| 327356 | 2005 UG_{236} | — | October 25, 2005 | Kitt Peak | Spacewatch | · | 2.1 km | MPC · JPL |
| 327357 | 2005 UR_{236} | — | October 25, 2005 | Kitt Peak | Spacewatch | · | 2.1 km | MPC · JPL |
| 327358 | 2005 US_{241} | — | October 25, 2005 | Kitt Peak | Spacewatch | · | 2.9 km | MPC · JPL |
| 327359 | 2005 UL_{243} | — | October 25, 2005 | Kitt Peak | Spacewatch | WIT | 1.1 km | MPC · JPL |
| 327360 | 2005 UV_{244} | — | October 25, 2005 | Kitt Peak | Spacewatch | · | 3.8 km | MPC · JPL |
| 327361 | 2005 UW_{254} | — | October 22, 2005 | Catalina | CSS | GEF | 1.5 km | MPC · JPL |
| 327362 | 2005 UM_{256} | — | September 25, 2005 | Kitt Peak | Spacewatch | · | 1.9 km | MPC · JPL |
| 327363 | 2005 UL_{260} | — | October 25, 2005 | Kitt Peak | Spacewatch | · | 1.2 km | MPC · JPL |
| 327364 | 2005 UG_{266} | — | October 22, 2005 | Kitt Peak | Spacewatch | · | 2.0 km | MPC · JPL |
| 327365 | 2005 UB_{269} | — | October 1, 2005 | Mount Lemmon | Mount Lemmon Survey | NEM | 2.6 km | MPC · JPL |
| 327366 | 2005 UJ_{276} | — | October 24, 2005 | Kitt Peak | Spacewatch | · | 1.4 km | MPC · JPL |
| 327367 | 2005 UF_{282} | — | October 26, 2005 | Kitt Peak | Spacewatch | · | 1.8 km | MPC · JPL |
| 327368 | 2005 UN_{283} | — | October 26, 2005 | Kitt Peak | Spacewatch | · | 1.8 km | MPC · JPL |
| 327369 | 2005 UX_{291} | — | October 26, 2005 | Kitt Peak | Spacewatch | · | 1.8 km | MPC · JPL |
| 327370 | 2005 UW_{293} | — | October 26, 2005 | Kitt Peak | Spacewatch | EUN | 1.3 km | MPC · JPL |
| 327371 | 2005 UF_{309} | — | October 28, 2005 | Mount Lemmon | Mount Lemmon Survey | · | 1.7 km | MPC · JPL |
| 327372 | 2005 UT_{310} | — | October 29, 2005 | Mount Lemmon | Mount Lemmon Survey | · | 1.9 km | MPC · JPL |
| 327373 | 2005 UP_{321} | — | October 27, 2005 | Mount Lemmon | Mount Lemmon Survey | MAR | 1.4 km | MPC · JPL |
| 327374 | 2005 UX_{322} | — | October 28, 2005 | Kitt Peak | Spacewatch | · | 1.6 km | MPC · JPL |
| 327375 | 2005 UU_{324} | — | October 29, 2005 | Mount Lemmon | Mount Lemmon Survey | · | 1.5 km | MPC · JPL |
| 327376 | 2005 UM_{328} | — | October 28, 2005 | Mount Lemmon | Mount Lemmon Survey | · | 2.3 km | MPC · JPL |
| 327377 | 2005 UO_{332} | — | October 29, 2005 | Kitt Peak | Spacewatch | AGN | 1.3 km | MPC · JPL |
| 327378 | 2005 UF_{333} | — | October 29, 2005 | Mount Lemmon | Mount Lemmon Survey | · | 2.1 km | MPC · JPL |
| 327379 | 2005 UP_{343} | — | October 31, 2005 | Catalina | CSS | EUN | 1.7 km | MPC · JPL |
| 327380 | 2005 UG_{349} | — | October 25, 2005 | Catalina | CSS | H | 610 m | MPC · JPL |
| 327381 | 2005 UW_{371} | — | September 30, 2005 | Mount Lemmon | Mount Lemmon Survey | KON | 2.5 km | MPC · JPL |
| 327382 | 2005 UK_{375} | — | October 27, 2005 | Kitt Peak | Spacewatch | · | 2.6 km | MPC · JPL |
| 327383 | 2005 UL_{378} | — | October 29, 2005 | Kitt Peak | Spacewatch | · | 1.2 km | MPC · JPL |
| 327384 | 2005 UG_{381} | — | October 29, 2005 | Kitt Peak | Spacewatch | · | 1.5 km | MPC · JPL |
| 327385 | 2005 UH_{387} | — | October 30, 2005 | Mount Lemmon | Mount Lemmon Survey | WIT | 960 m | MPC · JPL |
| 327386 | 2005 UN_{390} | — | October 29, 2005 | Mount Lemmon | Mount Lemmon Survey | · | 2.5 km | MPC · JPL |
| 327387 | 2005 UG_{412} | — | October 31, 2005 | Mount Lemmon | Mount Lemmon Survey | MAR | 1.6 km | MPC · JPL |
| 327388 | 2005 UX_{414} | — | October 25, 2005 | Kitt Peak | Spacewatch | · | 1.7 km | MPC · JPL |
| 327389 | 2005 UL_{430} | — | October 28, 2005 | Kitt Peak | Spacewatch | · | 2.0 km | MPC · JPL |
| 327390 | 2005 UU_{438} | — | October 28, 2005 | Catalina | CSS | KON | 3.1 km | MPC · JPL |
| 327391 | 2005 UV_{439} | — | October 29, 2005 | Catalina | CSS | · | 2.5 km | MPC · JPL |
| 327392 | 2005 UQ_{460} | — | October 28, 2005 | Mount Lemmon | Mount Lemmon Survey | · | 2.8 km | MPC · JPL |
| 327393 | 2005 UU_{463} | — | October 30, 2005 | Kitt Peak | Spacewatch | · | 2.0 km | MPC · JPL |
| 327394 | 2005 UE_{467} | — | October 30, 2005 | Kitt Peak | Spacewatch | · | 2.3 km | MPC · JPL |
| 327395 | 2005 UH_{478} | — | October 27, 2005 | Kitt Peak | Spacewatch | · | 2.5 km | MPC · JPL |
| 327396 | 2005 UL_{489} | — | October 23, 2005 | Catalina | CSS | · | 2.7 km | MPC · JPL |
| 327397 | 2005 UH_{493} | — | October 25, 2005 | Catalina | CSS | (18466) | 2.4 km | MPC · JPL |
| 327398 | 2005 UL_{505} | — | October 24, 2005 | Mauna Kea | D. J. Tholen | · | 3.6 km | MPC · JPL |
| 327399 | 2005 UL_{512} | — | October 30, 2005 | Kitt Peak | Spacewatch | · | 1.6 km | MPC · JPL |
| 327400 | 2005 UE_{521} | — | October 26, 2005 | Apache Point | A. C. Becker | · | 1.7 km | MPC · JPL |

== 327401–327500 ==
back to top

| Designation | | | Discovery | | | Properties | | Ref |
| Permanent | Provisional | Named after | Date | Site | Discoverer(s) | Category | Diam. | Ref |
|---|---|---|---|---|---|---|---|---|
| 327401 | 2005 VU | — | November 1, 2005 | La Silla | Behrend, R. | · | 2.0 km | MPC · JPL |
| 327402 | 2005 VV_{3} | — | November 5, 2005 | Socorro | LINEAR | H | 620 m | MPC · JPL |
| 327403 | 2005 VQ_{11} | — | November 3, 2005 | Kitt Peak | Spacewatch | · | 1.8 km | MPC · JPL |
| 327404 | 2005 VU_{22} | — | November 1, 2005 | Kitt Peak | Spacewatch | · | 1.1 km | MPC · JPL |
| 327405 | 2005 VO_{32} | — | November 4, 2005 | Kitt Peak | Spacewatch | MAR | 2.2 km | MPC · JPL |
| 327406 | 2005 VA_{33} | — | November 4, 2005 | Kitt Peak | Spacewatch | AGN | 1.7 km | MPC · JPL |
| 327407 | 2005 VG_{42} | — | November 3, 2005 | Catalina | CSS | (5) | 2.4 km | MPC · JPL |
| 327408 | 2005 VY_{42} | — | November 4, 2005 | Socorro | LINEAR | · | 2.6 km | MPC · JPL |
| 327409 | 2005 VA_{52} | — | November 3, 2005 | Catalina | CSS | EUN | 1.5 km | MPC · JPL |
| 327410 | 2005 VH_{58} | — | November 5, 2005 | Kitt Peak | Spacewatch | · | 1.7 km | MPC · JPL |
| 327411 | 2005 VL_{75} | — | November 1, 2005 | Socorro | LINEAR | · | 2.7 km | MPC · JPL |
| 327412 | 2005 VG_{89} | — | November 6, 2005 | Kitt Peak | Spacewatch | NEM | 2.4 km | MPC · JPL |
| 327413 | 2005 VY_{91} | — | November 6, 2005 | Mount Lemmon | Mount Lemmon Survey | · | 1.4 km | MPC · JPL |
| 327414 | 2005 VS_{101} | — | November 2, 2005 | Mount Lemmon | Mount Lemmon Survey | · | 2.8 km | MPC · JPL |
| 327415 | 2005 VV_{107} | — | November 5, 2005 | Kitt Peak | Spacewatch | AGN | 1.2 km | MPC · JPL |
| 327416 | 2005 VF_{112} | — | November 6, 2005 | Mount Lemmon | Mount Lemmon Survey | · | 2.4 km | MPC · JPL |
| 327417 | 2005 VP_{119} | — | November 8, 2005 | Wildberg | R. Apitzsch | · | 1.8 km | MPC · JPL |
| 327418 | 2005 VL_{122} | — | November 14, 2005 | Palomar | NEAT | H | 620 m | MPC · JPL |
| 327419 | 2005 VR_{128} | — | November 1, 2005 | Apache Point | A. C. Becker | · | 1.3 km | MPC · JPL |
| 327420 | 2005 VO_{135} | — | November 12, 2005 | Kitt Peak | Spacewatch | · | 1.9 km | MPC · JPL |
| 327421 Yanamandra | 2005 WP | Yanamandra | November 20, 2005 | Wrightwood | J. W. Young | · | 2.2 km | MPC · JPL |
| 327422 | 2005 WU_{15} | — | November 22, 2005 | Kitt Peak | Spacewatch | · | 2.8 km | MPC · JPL |
| 327423 | 2005 WH_{21} | — | November 21, 2005 | Kitt Peak | Spacewatch | · | 1.8 km | MPC · JPL |
| 327424 | 2005 WF_{22} | — | November 21, 2005 | Kitt Peak | Spacewatch | · | 1.4 km | MPC · JPL |
| 327425 | 2005 WK_{29} | — | November 21, 2005 | Kitt Peak | Spacewatch | · | 2.5 km | MPC · JPL |
| 327426 | 2005 WY_{34} | — | November 22, 2005 | Kitt Peak | Spacewatch | · | 2.1 km | MPC · JPL |
| 327427 | 2005 WC_{36} | — | November 22, 2005 | Kitt Peak | Spacewatch | AGN | 1.5 km | MPC · JPL |
| 327428 | 2005 WR_{36} | — | November 22, 2005 | Kitt Peak | Spacewatch | · | 2.4 km | MPC · JPL |
| 327429 | 2005 WP_{39} | — | November 25, 2005 | Mount Lemmon | Mount Lemmon Survey | AEO | 1.5 km | MPC · JPL |
| 327430 | 2005 WA_{59} | — | November 28, 2005 | Junk Bond | D. Healy | · | 2.3 km | MPC · JPL |
| 327431 | 2005 WY_{69} | — | November 26, 2005 | Kitt Peak | Spacewatch | HOF | 2.6 km | MPC · JPL |
| 327432 | 2005 WL_{75} | — | November 25, 2005 | Kitt Peak | Spacewatch | · | 1.8 km | MPC · JPL |
| 327433 | 2005 WY_{77} | — | November 25, 2005 | Kitt Peak | Spacewatch | AGN | 1.3 km | MPC · JPL |
| 327434 | 2005 WK_{81} | — | November 26, 2005 | Mount Lemmon | Mount Lemmon Survey | HOF | 2.6 km | MPC · JPL |
| 327435 | 2005 WO_{89} | — | November 26, 2005 | Kitt Peak | Spacewatch | · | 3.2 km | MPC · JPL |
| 327436 | 2005 WF_{95} | — | November 26, 2005 | Kitt Peak | Spacewatch | · | 1.6 km | MPC · JPL |
| 327437 | 2005 WE_{96} | — | November 26, 2005 | Kitt Peak | Spacewatch | BRA | 1.9 km | MPC · JPL |
| 327438 | 2005 WY_{98} | — | November 28, 2005 | Mount Lemmon | Mount Lemmon Survey | (5) | 1.4 km | MPC · JPL |
| 327439 | 2005 WR_{102} | — | November 25, 2005 | Catalina | CSS | · | 2.9 km | MPC · JPL |
| 327440 | 2005 WJ_{104} | — | November 1, 2005 | Mount Lemmon | Mount Lemmon Survey | AGN | 1.7 km | MPC · JPL |
| 327441 | 2005 WS_{104} | — | November 28, 2005 | Catalina | CSS | · | 2.5 km | MPC · JPL |
| 327442 | 2005 WY_{105} | — | November 29, 2005 | Catalina | CSS | · | 2.0 km | MPC · JPL |
| 327443 | 2005 WD_{110} | — | November 30, 2005 | Kitt Peak | Spacewatch | · | 2.6 km | MPC · JPL |
| 327444 | 2005 WR_{116} | — | November 30, 2005 | Socorro | LINEAR | H | 790 m | MPC · JPL |
| 327445 | 2005 WE_{121} | — | November 30, 2005 | Socorro | LINEAR | · | 2.5 km | MPC · JPL |
| 327446 | 2005 WK_{126} | — | November 25, 2005 | Mount Lemmon | Mount Lemmon Survey | · | 1.3 km | MPC · JPL |
| 327447 | 2005 WZ_{126} | — | November 25, 2005 | Catalina | CSS | ADE | 2.9 km | MPC · JPL |
| 327448 | 2005 WU_{128} | — | November 25, 2005 | Mount Lemmon | Mount Lemmon Survey | (5) | 1.7 km | MPC · JPL |
| 327449 | 2005 WB_{131} | — | November 25, 2005 | Mount Lemmon | Mount Lemmon Survey | · | 1.3 km | MPC · JPL |
| 327450 | 2005 WH_{137} | — | November 26, 2005 | Mount Lemmon | Mount Lemmon Survey | · | 1.3 km | MPC · JPL |
| 327451 | 2005 WR_{149} | — | November 28, 2005 | Kitt Peak | Spacewatch | · | 1.8 km | MPC · JPL |
| 327452 | 2005 WU_{153} | — | October 31, 2005 | Catalina | CSS | WIT | 1.5 km | MPC · JPL |
| 327453 | 2005 WM_{161} | — | November 28, 2005 | Mount Lemmon | Mount Lemmon Survey | · | 1.3 km | MPC · JPL |
| 327454 | 2005 WT_{164} | — | November 29, 2005 | Mount Lemmon | Mount Lemmon Survey | · | 2.3 km | MPC · JPL |
| 327455 | 2005 WF_{166} | — | November 29, 2005 | Mount Lemmon | Mount Lemmon Survey | · | 3.6 km | MPC · JPL |
| 327456 | 2005 WS_{166} | — | November 29, 2005 | Mount Lemmon | Mount Lemmon Survey | · | 2.1 km | MPC · JPL |
| 327457 | 2005 WG_{167} | — | November 30, 2005 | Kitt Peak | Spacewatch | (5) | 1.5 km | MPC · JPL |
| 327458 | 2005 WJ_{178} | — | November 30, 2005 | Kitt Peak | Spacewatch | · | 2.4 km | MPC · JPL |
| 327459 | 2005 WJ_{179} | — | November 21, 2005 | Anderson Mesa | LONEOS | · | 2.6 km | MPC · JPL |
| 327460 | 2005 WH_{186} | — | October 1, 2005 | Mount Lemmon | Mount Lemmon Survey | · | 2.7 km | MPC · JPL |
| 327461 | 2005 XN_{37} | — | December 4, 2005 | Kitt Peak | Spacewatch | · | 2.1 km | MPC · JPL |
| 327462 | 2005 XU_{56} | — | December 6, 2005 | Socorro | LINEAR | · | 2.5 km | MPC · JPL |
| 327463 | 2005 XO_{69} | — | December 6, 2005 | Kitt Peak | Spacewatch | · | 2.1 km | MPC · JPL |
| 327464 | 2005 XE_{76} | — | December 7, 2005 | Kitt Peak | Spacewatch | · | 2.4 km | MPC · JPL |
| 327465 | 2005 XT_{76} | — | November 1, 2005 | Kitt Peak | Spacewatch | · | 1.8 km | MPC · JPL |
| 327466 | 2005 XT_{92} | — | December 7, 2005 | Socorro | LINEAR | H | 710 m | MPC · JPL |
| 327467 | 2005 XK_{101} | — | December 1, 2005 | Kitt Peak | M. W. Buie | · | 3.1 km | MPC · JPL |
| 327468 | 2005 XT_{109} | — | December 1, 2005 | Kitt Peak | M. W. Buie | · | 2.7 km | MPC · JPL |
| 327469 | 2005 XX_{109} | — | December 1, 2005 | Kitt Peak | M. W. Buie | · | 3.0 km | MPC · JPL |
| 327470 | 2005 XC_{115} | — | December 2, 2005 | Mount Lemmon | Mount Lemmon Survey | · | 1.9 km | MPC · JPL |
| 327471 | 2005 YL_{2} | — | December 21, 2005 | Kitt Peak | Spacewatch | · | 1.4 km | MPC · JPL |
| 327472 | 2005 YM_{8} | — | December 23, 2005 | Palomar | NEAT | · | 2.8 km | MPC · JPL |
| 327473 | 2005 YJ_{16} | — | November 3, 2005 | Mount Lemmon | Mount Lemmon Survey | · | 2.4 km | MPC · JPL |
| 327474 | 2005 YW_{18} | — | December 23, 2005 | Kitt Peak | Spacewatch | · | 1.8 km | MPC · JPL |
| 327475 | 2005 YJ_{29} | — | October 29, 2005 | Mount Lemmon | Mount Lemmon Survey | · | 2.2 km | MPC · JPL |
| 327476 | 2005 YM_{47} | — | July 14, 2004 | Siding Spring | SSS | EUN | 1.5 km | MPC · JPL |
| 327477 | 2005 YH_{58} | — | December 24, 2005 | Kitt Peak | Spacewatch | · | 2.1 km | MPC · JPL |
| 327478 | 2005 YR_{58} | — | December 24, 2005 | Kitt Peak | Spacewatch | · | 2.0 km | MPC · JPL |
| 327479 | 2005 YY_{58} | — | December 25, 2005 | Mount Lemmon | Mount Lemmon Survey | KOR | 1.7 km | MPC · JPL |
| 327480 | 2005 YR_{77} | — | December 24, 2005 | Kitt Peak | Spacewatch | · | 2.5 km | MPC · JPL |
| 327481 | 2005 YD_{80} | — | December 24, 2005 | Kitt Peak | Spacewatch | · | 3.0 km | MPC · JPL |
| 327482 | 2005 YK_{81} | — | December 24, 2005 | Kitt Peak | Spacewatch | · | 1.9 km | MPC · JPL |
| 327483 | 2005 YD_{86} | — | December 25, 2005 | Mount Lemmon | Mount Lemmon Survey | · | 2.2 km | MPC · JPL |
| 327484 | 2005 YV_{88} | — | December 25, 2005 | Mount Lemmon | Mount Lemmon Survey | KOR | 1.4 km | MPC · JPL |
| 327485 | 2005 YK_{116} | — | December 25, 2005 | Kitt Peak | Spacewatch | · | 1.8 km | MPC · JPL |
| 327486 | 2005 YW_{140} | — | December 28, 2005 | Mount Lemmon | Mount Lemmon Survey | KOR | 1.4 km | MPC · JPL |
| 327487 | 2005 YD_{143} | — | December 28, 2005 | Mount Lemmon | Mount Lemmon Survey | TEL | 1.4 km | MPC · JPL |
| 327488 | 2005 YM_{147} | — | December 29, 2005 | Mount Lemmon | Mount Lemmon Survey | KOR | 1.7 km | MPC · JPL |
| 327489 | 2005 YE_{179} | — | December 26, 2005 | Mount Lemmon | Mount Lemmon Survey | · | 3.0 km | MPC · JPL |
| 327490 | 2005 YF_{181} | — | December 23, 2005 | Palomar | NEAT | H | 620 m | MPC · JPL |
| 327491 | 2005 YG_{181} | — | December 23, 2005 | Palomar | NEAT | · | 2.5 km | MPC · JPL |
| 327492 | 2005 YB_{189} | — | December 29, 2005 | Kitt Peak | Spacewatch | THM | 2.7 km | MPC · JPL |
| 327493 | 2005 YL_{193} | — | December 30, 2005 | Kitt Peak | Spacewatch | · | 2.3 km | MPC · JPL |
| 327494 | 2005 YS_{197} | — | December 25, 2005 | Kitt Peak | Spacewatch | · | 1.9 km | MPC · JPL |
| 327495 | 2005 YM_{200} | — | December 22, 2005 | Kitt Peak | Spacewatch | KOR | 1.7 km | MPC · JPL |
| 327496 | 2005 YE_{245} | — | December 30, 2005 | Kitt Peak | Spacewatch | · | 1.8 km | MPC · JPL |
| 327497 | 2005 YU_{281} | — | December 26, 2005 | Mount Lemmon | Mount Lemmon Survey | HOF | 3.7 km | MPC · JPL |
| 327498 | 2006 AL_{10} | — | January 4, 2006 | Mount Lemmon | Mount Lemmon Survey | AGN | 1.1 km | MPC · JPL |
| 327499 | 2006 AR_{22} | — | January 6, 2006 | Socorro | LINEAR | · | 3.2 km | MPC · JPL |
| 327500 | 2006 AQ_{36} | — | January 4, 2006 | Kitt Peak | Spacewatch | EOS | 2.0 km | MPC · JPL |

== 327501–327600 ==
back to top

| Designation | | | Discovery | | | Properties | | Ref |
| Permanent | Provisional | Named after | Date | Site | Discoverer(s) | Category | Diam. | Ref |
|---|---|---|---|---|---|---|---|---|
| 327501 | 2006 AE_{56} | — | December 28, 2005 | Kitt Peak | Spacewatch | · | 2.6 km | MPC · JPL |
| 327502 | 2006 AO_{62} | — | January 6, 2006 | Kitt Peak | Spacewatch | · | 2.4 km | MPC · JPL |
| 327503 | 2006 AJ_{69} | — | January 6, 2006 | Kitt Peak | Spacewatch | · | 2.8 km | MPC · JPL |
| 327504 | 2006 AP_{70} | — | January 6, 2006 | Kitt Peak | Spacewatch | · | 2.9 km | MPC · JPL |
| 327505 | 2006 AF_{78} | — | January 8, 2006 | Mount Lemmon | Mount Lemmon Survey | · | 3.1 km | MPC · JPL |
| 327506 | 2006 AE_{79} | — | January 6, 2006 | Kitt Peak | Spacewatch | EOS | 2.2 km | MPC · JPL |
| 327507 | 2006 AB_{105} | — | January 7, 2006 | Mount Lemmon | Mount Lemmon Survey | EOS | 2.1 km | MPC · JPL |
| 327508 | 2006 BS | — | January 20, 2006 | Socorro | LINEAR | EUP | 4.2 km | MPC · JPL |
| 327509 | 2006 BV_{6} | — | January 20, 2006 | Kitt Peak | Spacewatch | · | 4.3 km | MPC · JPL |
| 327510 | 2006 BO_{17} | — | January 22, 2006 | Mount Lemmon | Mount Lemmon Survey | EOS | 2.3 km | MPC · JPL |
| 327511 | 2006 BB_{25} | — | January 23, 2006 | Mount Lemmon | Mount Lemmon Survey | · | 2.5 km | MPC · JPL |
| 327512 Bíró | 2006 BR_{26} | Bíró | January 24, 2006 | Piszkéstető | K. Sárneczky | · | 1.7 km | MPC · JPL |
| 327513 | 2006 BJ_{46} | — | January 23, 2006 | Mount Lemmon | Mount Lemmon Survey | · | 2.6 km | MPC · JPL |
| 327514 | 2006 BF_{54} | — | January 25, 2006 | Kitt Peak | Spacewatch | TIR | 3.1 km | MPC · JPL |
| 327515 | 2006 BO_{61} | — | January 22, 2006 | Catalina | CSS | BRA | 2.7 km | MPC · JPL |
| 327516 | 2006 BV_{67} | — | January 23, 2006 | Kitt Peak | Spacewatch | KOR | 1.5 km | MPC · JPL |
| 327517 | 2006 BY_{71} | — | January 23, 2006 | Kitt Peak | Spacewatch | · | 2.1 km | MPC · JPL |
| 327518 | 2006 BU_{78} | — | January 23, 2006 | Kitt Peak | Spacewatch | · | 3.0 km | MPC · JPL |
| 327519 | 2006 BN_{79} | — | January 23, 2006 | Kitt Peak | Spacewatch | · | 3.8 km | MPC · JPL |
| 327520 | 2006 BD_{88} | — | January 25, 2006 | Kitt Peak | Spacewatch | · | 2.1 km | MPC · JPL |
| 327521 | 2006 BM_{94} | — | January 26, 2006 | Kitt Peak | Spacewatch | EOS | 2.3 km | MPC · JPL |
| 327522 | 2006 BK_{97} | — | January 26, 2006 | Mount Lemmon | Mount Lemmon Survey | · | 2.6 km | MPC · JPL |
| 327523 | 2006 BS_{108} | — | January 25, 2006 | Kitt Peak | Spacewatch | · | 2.2 km | MPC · JPL |
| 327524 | 2006 BM_{112} | — | January 25, 2006 | Kitt Peak | Spacewatch | · | 1.9 km | MPC · JPL |
| 327525 | 2006 BN_{112} | — | January 25, 2006 | Kitt Peak | Spacewatch | · | 2.7 km | MPC · JPL |
| 327526 | 2006 BP_{112} | — | January 25, 2006 | Kitt Peak | Spacewatch | · | 2.6 km | MPC · JPL |
| 327527 | 2006 BQ_{126} | — | January 26, 2006 | Kitt Peak | Spacewatch | EOS | 2.2 km | MPC · JPL |
| 327528 | 2006 BH_{128} | — | January 26, 2006 | Kitt Peak | Spacewatch | EOS | 3.1 km | MPC · JPL |
| 327529 | 2006 BW_{136} | — | January 28, 2006 | Mount Lemmon | Mount Lemmon Survey | · | 2.4 km | MPC · JPL |
| 327530 | 2006 BK_{137} | — | January 28, 2006 | Mount Lemmon | Mount Lemmon Survey | · | 2.6 km | MPC · JPL |
| 327531 | 2006 BT_{142} | — | January 26, 2006 | Mount Lemmon | Mount Lemmon Survey | · | 2.5 km | MPC · JPL |
| 327532 | 2006 BU_{145} | — | January 24, 2006 | Socorro | LINEAR | · | 2.3 km | MPC · JPL |
| 327533 | 2006 BE_{150} | — | January 24, 2006 | Anderson Mesa | LONEOS | · | 3.4 km | MPC · JPL |
| 327534 | 2006 BR_{151} | — | January 25, 2006 | Kitt Peak | Spacewatch | KOR | 1.7 km | MPC · JPL |
| 327535 | 2006 BY_{151} | — | January 25, 2006 | Kitt Peak | Spacewatch | KOR | 1.7 km | MPC · JPL |
| 327536 | 2006 BJ_{154} | — | January 25, 2006 | Kitt Peak | Spacewatch | · | 2.3 km | MPC · JPL |
| 327537 | 2006 BT_{157} | — | January 25, 2006 | Kitt Peak | Spacewatch | · | 2.8 km | MPC · JPL |
| 327538 | 2006 BE_{169} | — | January 26, 2006 | Mount Lemmon | Mount Lemmon Survey | · | 2.5 km | MPC · JPL |
| 327539 | 2006 BU_{179} | — | January 27, 2006 | Mount Lemmon | Mount Lemmon Survey | · | 2.1 km | MPC · JPL |
| 327540 | 2006 BN_{180} | — | January 27, 2006 | Mount Lemmon | Mount Lemmon Survey | · | 2.7 km | MPC · JPL |
| 327541 | 2006 BO_{186} | — | January 28, 2006 | Mount Lemmon | Mount Lemmon Survey | · | 7.1 km | MPC · JPL |
| 327542 | 2006 BV_{193} | — | January 30, 2006 | Kitt Peak | Spacewatch | EOS | 2.0 km | MPC · JPL |
| 327543 | 2006 BQ_{246} | — | January 31, 2006 | Mount Lemmon | Mount Lemmon Survey | AGN | 1.2 km | MPC · JPL |
| 327544 | 2006 BM_{250} | — | January 31, 2006 | Kitt Peak | Spacewatch | · | 3.4 km | MPC · JPL |
| 327545 | 2006 BR_{256} | — | January 31, 2006 | Kitt Peak | Spacewatch | EOS | 2.2 km | MPC · JPL |
| 327546 | 2006 BL_{258} | — | January 23, 2006 | Kitt Peak | Spacewatch | · | 2.6 km | MPC · JPL |
| 327547 | 2006 BQ_{262} | — | January 31, 2006 | Kitt Peak | Spacewatch | · | 2.2 km | MPC · JPL |
| 327548 | 2006 BX_{276} | — | January 25, 2006 | Kitt Peak | Spacewatch | · | 2.7 km | MPC · JPL |
| 327549 | 2006 BB_{278} | — | January 23, 2006 | Kitt Peak | Spacewatch | · | 2.5 km | MPC · JPL |
| 327550 | 2006 BO_{280} | — | January 31, 2006 | Kitt Peak | Spacewatch | EMA | 3.6 km | MPC · JPL |
| 327551 | 2006 BS_{281} | — | January 23, 2006 | Kitt Peak | Spacewatch | · | 2.0 km | MPC · JPL |
| 327552 | 2006 CO_{10} | — | February 4, 2006 | Wrightwood | J. W. Young | LIX | 3.4 km | MPC · JPL |
| 327553 | 2006 CK_{11} | — | February 1, 2006 | Kitt Peak | Spacewatch | EMA | 5.5 km | MPC · JPL |
| 327554 | 2006 CB_{20} | — | February 1, 2006 | Mount Lemmon | Mount Lemmon Survey | · | 1.7 km | MPC · JPL |
| 327555 | 2006 CE_{25} | — | February 2, 2006 | Kitt Peak | Spacewatch | · | 3.7 km | MPC · JPL |
| 327556 | 2006 CR_{40} | — | February 2, 2006 | Mount Lemmon | Mount Lemmon Survey | VER | 3.1 km | MPC · JPL |
| 327557 | 2006 CT_{42} | — | February 2, 2006 | Kitt Peak | Spacewatch | · | 2.4 km | MPC · JPL |
| 327558 | 2006 CE_{52} | — | January 22, 2006 | Mount Lemmon | Mount Lemmon Survey | · | 2.4 km | MPC · JPL |
| 327559 | 2006 CS_{63} | — | February 2, 2006 | Mauna Kea | P. A. Wiegert | DOR | 2.8 km | MPC · JPL |
| 327560 | 2006 DB | — | February 20, 2006 | Mayhill | Lowe, A. | EOS | 2.5 km | MPC · JPL |
| 327561 | 2006 DE_{2} | — | February 20, 2006 | Kitt Peak | Spacewatch | · | 4.7 km | MPC · JPL |
| 327562 | 2006 DS_{5} | — | February 20, 2006 | Mount Lemmon | Mount Lemmon Survey | · | 2.6 km | MPC · JPL |
| 327563 | 2006 DG_{6} | — | February 20, 2006 | Catalina | CSS | · | 3.7 km | MPC · JPL |
| 327564 | 2006 DH_{6} | — | February 20, 2006 | Catalina | CSS | TIR | 3.6 km | MPC · JPL |
| 327565 | 2006 DL_{13} | — | February 22, 2006 | Catalina | CSS | · | 3.4 km | MPC · JPL |
| 327566 | 2006 DO_{15} | — | January 23, 2006 | Kitt Peak | Spacewatch | · | 3.9 km | MPC · JPL |
| 327567 | 2006 DP_{27} | — | February 20, 2006 | Kitt Peak | Spacewatch | URS | 3.5 km | MPC · JPL |
| 327568 | 2006 DP_{29} | — | January 23, 2006 | Kitt Peak | Spacewatch | KOR | 2.0 km | MPC · JPL |
| 327569 | 2006 DD_{33} | — | February 20, 2006 | Kitt Peak | Spacewatch | · | 4.7 km | MPC · JPL |
| 327570 | 2006 DR_{38} | — | February 21, 2006 | Mount Lemmon | Mount Lemmon Survey | · | 3.6 km | MPC · JPL |
| 327571 | 2006 DT_{40} | — | February 22, 2006 | Catalina | CSS | · | 3.8 km | MPC · JPL |
| 327572 | 2006 DJ_{46} | — | February 20, 2006 | Mount Lemmon | Mount Lemmon Survey | · | 2.4 km | MPC · JPL |
| 327573 | 2006 DK_{71} | — | February 20, 2006 | Catalina | CSS | · | 4.1 km | MPC · JPL |
| 327574 | 2006 DM_{100} | — | February 4, 2006 | Kitt Peak | Spacewatch | THM | 2.2 km | MPC · JPL |
| 327575 | 2006 DR_{104} | — | February 25, 2006 | Kitt Peak | Spacewatch | · | 3.8 km | MPC · JPL |
| 327576 | 2006 DE_{122} | — | January 28, 2006 | Anderson Mesa | LONEOS | · | 4.1 km | MPC · JPL |
| 327577 | 2006 DB_{125} | — | February 3, 2006 | Mount Lemmon | Mount Lemmon Survey | · | 4.8 km | MPC · JPL |
| 327578 | 2006 DT_{130} | — | February 25, 2006 | Kitt Peak | Spacewatch | · | 4.5 km | MPC · JPL |
| 327579 | 2006 DX_{130} | — | February 25, 2006 | Mount Lemmon | Mount Lemmon Survey | · | 3.2 km | MPC · JPL |
| 327580 | 2006 DW_{131} | — | February 25, 2006 | Kitt Peak | Spacewatch | · | 2.6 km | MPC · JPL |
| 327581 | 2006 DC_{132} | — | February 25, 2006 | Kitt Peak | Spacewatch | · | 3.7 km | MPC · JPL |
| 327582 | 2006 DM_{132} | — | January 7, 2000 | Kitt Peak | Spacewatch | · | 3.1 km | MPC · JPL |
| 327583 | 2006 DT_{135} | — | January 31, 2006 | Kitt Peak | Spacewatch | · | 2.2 km | MPC · JPL |
| 327584 | 2006 DX_{139} | — | February 25, 2006 | Kitt Peak | Spacewatch | · | 3.4 km | MPC · JPL |
| 327585 | 2006 DT_{144} | — | February 25, 2006 | Mount Lemmon | Mount Lemmon Survey | VER | 3.0 km | MPC · JPL |
| 327586 | 2006 DE_{157} | — | February 27, 2006 | Kitt Peak | Spacewatch | · | 3.6 km | MPC · JPL |
| 327587 | 2006 DX_{159} | — | February 27, 2006 | Kitt Peak | Spacewatch | · | 2.7 km | MPC · JPL |
| 327588 | 2006 DB_{160} | — | February 27, 2006 | Kitt Peak | Spacewatch | · | 3.8 km | MPC · JPL |
| 327589 | 2006 DM_{165} | — | February 27, 2006 | Kitt Peak | Spacewatch | · | 2.5 km | MPC · JPL |
| 327590 | 2006 DQ_{166} | — | February 27, 2006 | Kitt Peak | Spacewatch | · | 3.7 km | MPC · JPL |
| 327591 | 2006 DO_{169} | — | February 27, 2006 | Kitt Peak | Spacewatch | · | 3.7 km | MPC · JPL |
| 327592 | 2006 DJ_{182} | — | February 27, 2006 | Mount Lemmon | Mount Lemmon Survey | · | 3.2 km | MPC · JPL |
| 327593 | 2006 DP_{188} | — | February 27, 2006 | Kitt Peak | Spacewatch | · | 2.5 km | MPC · JPL |
| 327594 | 2006 DM_{189} | — | February 27, 2006 | Kitt Peak | Spacewatch | T_{j} (2.98) | 4.0 km | MPC · JPL |
| 327595 | 2006 DK_{194} | — | September 19, 2003 | Kitt Peak | Spacewatch | · | 2.6 km | MPC · JPL |
| 327596 | 2006 DY_{195} | — | January 28, 2006 | Catalina | CSS | · | 4.1 km | MPC · JPL |
| 327597 | 2006 DH_{196} | — | February 22, 2006 | Catalina | CSS | · | 2.7 km | MPC · JPL |
| 327598 | 2006 DP_{197} | — | February 24, 2006 | Catalina | CSS | TIR | 4.0 km | MPC · JPL |
| 327599 | 2006 DO_{201} | — | February 28, 2006 | Catalina | CSS | TIR | 3.4 km | MPC · JPL |
| 327600 | 2006 DQ_{202} | — | February 21, 2006 | Catalina | CSS | · | 3.9 km | MPC · JPL |

== 327601–327700 ==
back to top

| Designation | | | Discovery | | | Properties | | Ref |
| Permanent | Provisional | Named after | Date | Site | Discoverer(s) | Category | Diam. | Ref |
|---|---|---|---|---|---|---|---|---|
| 327601 | 2006 DQ_{211} | — | February 24, 2006 | Mount Lemmon | Mount Lemmon Survey | THB | 3.7 km | MPC · JPL |
| 327602 | 2006 DS_{214} | — | February 25, 2006 | Mount Lemmon | Mount Lemmon Survey | · | 5.6 km | MPC · JPL |
| 327603 | 2006 EF_{3} | — | March 2, 2006 | Kitt Peak | Spacewatch | · | 2.4 km | MPC · JPL |
| 327604 | 2006 EP_{17} | — | March 2, 2006 | Kitt Peak | Spacewatch | · | 3.3 km | MPC · JPL |
| 327605 | 2006 EK_{19} | — | March 2, 2006 | Kitt Peak | Spacewatch | · | 4.4 km | MPC · JPL |
| 327606 | 2006 ER_{35} | — | March 3, 2006 | Kitt Peak | Spacewatch | · | 3.6 km | MPC · JPL |
| 327607 | 2006 ED_{37} | — | March 3, 2006 | Mount Lemmon | Mount Lemmon Survey | THM | 2.9 km | MPC · JPL |
| 327608 | 2006 EC_{47} | — | March 4, 2006 | Kitt Peak | Spacewatch | · | 3.5 km | MPC · JPL |
| 327609 | 2006 EN_{47} | — | March 4, 2006 | Kitt Peak | Spacewatch | · | 2.4 km | MPC · JPL |
| 327610 | 2006 EK_{54} | — | March 4, 2006 | Kitt Peak | Spacewatch | · | 4.4 km | MPC · JPL |
| 327611 | 2006 EY_{71} | — | March 4, 2006 | Mount Lemmon | Mount Lemmon Survey | · | 4.2 km | MPC · JPL |
| 327612 | 2006 FC_{12} | — | March 23, 2006 | Kitt Peak | Spacewatch | · | 2.7 km | MPC · JPL |
| 327613 | 2006 FO_{19} | — | March 23, 2006 | Mount Lemmon | Mount Lemmon Survey | HYG | 3.1 km | MPC · JPL |
| 327614 | 2006 FN_{20} | — | March 23, 2006 | Mount Lemmon | Mount Lemmon Survey | · | 5.3 km | MPC · JPL |
| 327615 | 2006 FR_{27} | — | March 24, 2006 | Mount Lemmon | Mount Lemmon Survey | (11097) | 2.8 km | MPC · JPL |
| 327616 | 2006 FN_{42} | — | March 26, 2006 | Mount Lemmon | Mount Lemmon Survey | · | 7.0 km | MPC · JPL |
| 327617 | 2006 GD_{4} | — | April 2, 2006 | Kitt Peak | Spacewatch | · | 3.9 km | MPC · JPL |
| 327618 | 2006 GP_{4} | — | April 2, 2006 | Kitt Peak | Spacewatch | · | 3.2 km | MPC · JPL |
| 327619 | 2006 GM_{18} | — | April 2, 2006 | Mount Lemmon | Mount Lemmon Survey | EOS | 2.9 km | MPC · JPL |
| 327620 | 2006 GO_{41} | — | April 7, 2006 | Catalina | CSS | T_{j} (2.98) | 4.0 km | MPC · JPL |
| 327621 | 2006 GK_{54} | — | April 7, 2006 | Mount Lemmon | Mount Lemmon Survey | · | 3.2 km | MPC · JPL |
| 327622 | 2006 HS_{2} | — | April 18, 2006 | Kitt Peak | Spacewatch | · | 3.0 km | MPC · JPL |
| 327623 | 2006 HT_{2} | — | March 29, 2006 | Kitt Peak | Spacewatch | · | 3.3 km | MPC · JPL |
| 327624 | 2006 HK_{42} | — | April 23, 2006 | Anderson Mesa | LONEOS | · | 4.2 km | MPC · JPL |
| 327625 | 2006 HU_{55} | — | December 5, 1999 | Socorro | LINEAR | T_{j} (2.99) | 6.0 km | MPC · JPL |
| 327626 | 2006 HD_{76} | — | April 25, 2006 | Kitt Peak | Spacewatch | · | 5.8 km | MPC · JPL |
| 327627 | 2006 HS_{104} | — | April 18, 2006 | Catalina | CSS | · | 5.1 km | MPC · JPL |
| 327628 | 2006 JY_{52} | — | May 6, 2006 | Mount Lemmon | Mount Lemmon Survey | · | 4.0 km | MPC · JPL |
| 327629 | 2006 KQ_{84} | — | May 23, 2006 | Kitt Peak | Spacewatch | CYB | 4.4 km | MPC · JPL |
| 327630 | 2006 MC_{3} | — | June 19, 2006 | Kitt Peak | Spacewatch | CYB | 4.0 km | MPC · JPL |
| 327631 | 2006 OU_{8} | — | July 20, 2006 | Palomar | NEAT | · | 800 m | MPC · JPL |
| 327632 Ferrarini | 2006 OJ_{10} | Ferrarini | July 24, 2006 | Vicques | M. Ory | · | 1.0 km | MPC · JPL |
| 327633 | 2006 PX_{1} | — | August 12, 2006 | Palomar | NEAT | · | 680 m | MPC · JPL |
| 327634 | 2006 PM_{5} | — | August 12, 2006 | Palomar | NEAT | · | 1.0 km | MPC · JPL |
| 327635 | 2006 PZ_{6} | — | August 12, 2006 | Palomar | NEAT | · | 690 m | MPC · JPL |
| 327636 | 2006 PL_{8} | — | August 13, 2006 | Palomar | NEAT | · | 760 m | MPC · JPL |
| 327637 | 2006 PS_{22} | — | August 15, 2006 | Palomar | NEAT | · | 1.3 km | MPC · JPL |
| 327638 | 2006 PN_{32} | — | August 15, 2006 | Palomar | NEAT | · | 1.1 km | MPC · JPL |
| 327639 | 2006 QL_{7} | — | August 18, 2006 | Kitt Peak | Spacewatch | · | 780 m | MPC · JPL |
| 327640 | 2006 QS_{7} | — | August 19, 2006 | Kitt Peak | Spacewatch | · | 780 m | MPC · JPL |
| 327641 | 2006 QP_{8} | — | August 19, 2006 | Kitt Peak | Spacewatch | · | 750 m | MPC · JPL |
| 327642 | 2006 QF_{10} | — | August 18, 2006 | Reedy Creek | J. Broughton | · | 880 m | MPC · JPL |
| 327643 | 2006 QG_{10} | — | August 18, 2006 | Reedy Creek | J. Broughton | · | 920 m | MPC · JPL |
| 327644 | 2006 QJ_{12} | — | August 16, 2006 | Siding Spring | SSS | · | 1.1 km | MPC · JPL |
| 327645 | 2006 QO_{16} | — | August 17, 2006 | Palomar | NEAT | · | 920 m | MPC · JPL |
| 327646 | 2006 QX_{18} | — | August 17, 2006 | Palomar | NEAT | · | 980 m | MPC · JPL |
| 327647 | 2006 QT_{21} | — | August 19, 2006 | Anderson Mesa | LONEOS | · | 800 m | MPC · JPL |
| 327648 | 2006 QC_{23} | — | August 19, 2006 | Palomar | NEAT | · | 1.1 km | MPC · JPL |
| 327649 | 2006 QT_{26} | — | August 19, 2006 | Kitt Peak | Spacewatch | · | 730 m | MPC · JPL |
| 327650 | 2006 QM_{28} | — | August 21, 2006 | Socorro | LINEAR | · | 930 m | MPC · JPL |
| 327651 | 2006 QA_{33} | — | August 22, 2006 | Palomar | NEAT | · | 1.0 km | MPC · JPL |
| 327652 | 2006 QG_{38} | — | August 16, 2006 | Lulin | Lin, C.-S., Q. Ye | · | 900 m | MPC · JPL |
| 327653 | 2006 QX_{38} | — | August 18, 2006 | Socorro | LINEAR | · | 1.0 km | MPC · JPL |
| 327654 | 2006 QM_{47} | — | August 20, 2006 | Palomar | NEAT | · | 680 m | MPC · JPL |
| 327655 | 2006 QF_{59} | — | August 19, 2006 | Anderson Mesa | LONEOS | · | 1.2 km | MPC · JPL |
| 327656 | 2006 QW_{60} | — | August 21, 2006 | Socorro | LINEAR | V | 880 m | MPC · JPL |
| 327657 | 2006 QV_{61} | — | August 22, 2006 | Palomar | NEAT | · | 1.0 km | MPC · JPL |
| 327658 | 2006 QG_{62} | — | August 22, 2006 | Palomar | NEAT | · | 1.2 km | MPC · JPL |
| 327659 | 2006 QJ_{62} | — | August 22, 2006 | Palomar | NEAT | · | 950 m | MPC · JPL |
| 327660 | 2006 QX_{88} | — | August 27, 2006 | Kitt Peak | Spacewatch | · | 740 m | MPC · JPL |
| 327661 | 2006 QO_{92} | — | August 16, 2006 | Palomar | NEAT | · | 950 m | MPC · JPL |
| 327662 | 2006 QT_{98} | — | August 22, 2006 | Palomar | NEAT | 3:2 | 5.6 km | MPC · JPL |
| 327663 | 2006 QV_{112} | — | August 24, 2006 | Socorro | LINEAR | · | 650 m | MPC · JPL |
| 327664 | 2006 QR_{113} | — | August 24, 2006 | Palomar | NEAT | V | 730 m | MPC · JPL |
| 327665 | 2006 QQ_{120} | — | August 29, 2006 | Catalina | CSS | · | 1.2 km | MPC · JPL |
| 327666 | 2006 QN_{135} | — | August 27, 2006 | Anderson Mesa | LONEOS | · | 870 m | MPC · JPL |
| 327667 | 2006 QD_{137} | — | May 24, 2006 | Mount Lemmon | Mount Lemmon Survey | V | 740 m | MPC · JPL |
| 327668 | 2006 QV_{161} | — | August 19, 2006 | Kitt Peak | Spacewatch | · | 820 m | MPC · JPL |
| 327669 | 2006 QU_{169} | — | August 28, 2006 | Anderson Mesa | LONEOS | NYS | 1.1 km | MPC · JPL |
| 327670 | 2006 QH_{187} | — | August 16, 2006 | Siding Spring | SSS | · | 820 m | MPC · JPL |
| 327671 | 2006 RF_{9} | — | September 12, 2006 | Catalina | CSS | · | 940 m | MPC · JPL |
| 327672 | 2006 RO_{11} | — | September 12, 2006 | Catalina | CSS | fast | 800 m | MPC · JPL |
| 327673 | 2006 RQ_{11} | — | August 28, 2006 | Catalina | CSS | · | 840 m | MPC · JPL |
| 327674 | 2006 RT_{17} | — | September 14, 2006 | Palomar | NEAT | · | 1.4 km | MPC · JPL |
| 327675 | 2006 RO_{23} | — | September 12, 2006 | Catalina | CSS | · | 850 m | MPC · JPL |
| 327676 | 2006 RA_{24} | — | September 13, 2006 | Palomar | NEAT | · | 1.6 km | MPC · JPL |
| 327677 | 2006 RZ_{30} | — | September 15, 2006 | Socorro | LINEAR | · | 900 m | MPC · JPL |
| 327678 | 2006 RX_{32} | — | September 15, 2006 | Kitt Peak | Spacewatch | · | 1.2 km | MPC · JPL |
| 327679 | 2006 RS_{37} | — | September 12, 2006 | Catalina | CSS | · | 1.2 km | MPC · JPL |
| 327680 | 2006 RT_{38} | — | September 14, 2006 | Catalina | CSS | · | 900 m | MPC · JPL |
| 327681 | 2006 RK_{42} | — | September 14, 2006 | Kitt Peak | Spacewatch | · | 1.3 km | MPC · JPL |
| 327682 | 2006 RP_{44} | — | September 14, 2006 | Kitt Peak | Spacewatch | · | 940 m | MPC · JPL |
| 327683 | 2006 RM_{47} | — | September 14, 2006 | Kitt Peak | Spacewatch | · | 1.2 km | MPC · JPL |
| 327684 | 2006 RE_{53} | — | September 14, 2006 | Kitt Peak | Spacewatch | · | 880 m | MPC · JPL |
| 327685 | 2006 RJ_{53} | — | September 14, 2006 | Kitt Peak | Spacewatch | · | 890 m | MPC · JPL |
| 327686 | 2006 RE_{58} | — | September 15, 2006 | Kitt Peak | Spacewatch | · | 1.0 km | MPC · JPL |
| 327687 | 2006 RZ_{79} | — | September 15, 2006 | Kitt Peak | Spacewatch | · | 710 m | MPC · JPL |
| 327688 | 2006 RK_{82} | — | September 15, 2006 | Kitt Peak | Spacewatch | · | 1.5 km | MPC · JPL |
| 327689 | 2006 RU_{90} | — | September 15, 2006 | Kitt Peak | Spacewatch | · | 1.4 km | MPC · JPL |
| 327690 | 2006 RW_{93} | — | September 15, 2006 | Kitt Peak | Spacewatch | V | 560 m | MPC · JPL |
| 327691 | 2006 RH_{97} | — | September 15, 2006 | Kitt Peak | Spacewatch | · | 610 m | MPC · JPL |
| 327692 | 2006 RZ_{101} | — | September 14, 2006 | Kitt Peak | Spacewatch | · | 820 m | MPC · JPL |
| 327693 | 2006 RC_{102} | — | September 15, 2006 | Kitt Peak | Spacewatch | · | 780 m | MPC · JPL |
| 327694 | 2006 RS_{105} | — | September 14, 2006 | Mauna Kea | Masiero, J. | · | 1.1 km | MPC · JPL |
| 327695 Yokoono | 2006 RF_{107} | Yokoono | September 14, 2006 | Mauna Kea | Masiero, J. | · | 950 m | MPC · JPL |
| 327696 | 2006 SH_{4} | — | September 16, 2006 | Catalina | CSS | V | 800 m | MPC · JPL |
| 327697 | 2006 SZ_{8} | — | September 17, 2006 | Anderson Mesa | LONEOS | · | 930 m | MPC · JPL |
| 327698 | 2006 SD_{16} | — | September 17, 2006 | Catalina | CSS | · | 1.1 km | MPC · JPL |
| 327699 | 2006 SX_{21} | — | September 17, 2006 | Catalina | CSS | · | 1.2 km | MPC · JPL |
| 327700 | 2006 SB_{34} | — | September 17, 2006 | Catalina | CSS | · | 860 m | MPC · JPL |

== 327701–327800 ==
back to top

| Designation | | | Discovery | | | Properties | | Ref |
| Permanent | Provisional | Named after | Date | Site | Discoverer(s) | Category | Diam. | Ref |
|---|---|---|---|---|---|---|---|---|
| 327701 | 2006 SQ_{35} | — | September 17, 2006 | Kitt Peak | Spacewatch | · | 840 m | MPC · JPL |
| 327702 | 2006 SA_{36} | — | September 17, 2006 | Anderson Mesa | LONEOS | · | 900 m | MPC · JPL |
| 327703 | 2006 SD_{36} | — | September 17, 2006 | Anderson Mesa | LONEOS | · | 1.1 km | MPC · JPL |
| 327704 | 2006 SZ_{36} | — | September 17, 2006 | Kitt Peak | Spacewatch | · | 1.2 km | MPC · JPL |
| 327705 | 2006 SR_{41} | — | September 18, 2006 | Anderson Mesa | LONEOS | · | 1.4 km | MPC · JPL |
| 327706 | 2006 SP_{42} | — | September 18, 2006 | Anderson Mesa | LONEOS | · | 1.5 km | MPC · JPL |
| 327707 | 2006 SE_{52} | — | September 18, 2006 | Catalina | CSS | · | 1.1 km | MPC · JPL |
| 327708 | 2006 SW_{54} | — | September 18, 2006 | Catalina | CSS | · | 930 m | MPC · JPL |
| 327709 | 2006 SF_{76} | — | September 19, 2006 | Kitt Peak | Spacewatch | · | 1.3 km | MPC · JPL |
| 327710 | 2006 SM_{77} | — | September 19, 2006 | Socorro | LINEAR | · | 1.1 km | MPC · JPL |
| 327711 | 2006 SJ_{91} | — | September 18, 2006 | Kitt Peak | Spacewatch | · | 900 m | MPC · JPL |
| 327712 | 2006 SZ_{97} | — | September 18, 2006 | Kitt Peak | Spacewatch | · | 1.2 km | MPC · JPL |
| 327713 | 2006 SV_{103} | — | September 19, 2006 | Kitt Peak | Spacewatch | · | 910 m | MPC · JPL |
| 327714 | 2006 SG_{135} | — | September 20, 2006 | Catalina | CSS | T_{j} (2.98) · HIL · 3:2 · (6124) | 7.4 km | MPC · JPL |
| 327715 | 2006 SL_{135} | — | September 20, 2006 | Palomar | NEAT | fast | 1.7 km | MPC · JPL |
| 327716 | 2006 SS_{136} | — | September 20, 2006 | Catalina | CSS | V | 850 m | MPC · JPL |
| 327717 | 2006 SD_{138} | — | May 15, 2005 | Mount Lemmon | Mount Lemmon Survey | · | 1.7 km | MPC · JPL |
| 327718 | 2006 ST_{138} | — | September 21, 2006 | Anderson Mesa | LONEOS | · | 640 m | MPC · JPL |
| 327719 | 2006 SP_{139} | — | September 21, 2006 | Anderson Mesa | LONEOS | · | 970 m | MPC · JPL |
| 327720 | 2006 ST_{154} | — | September 21, 2006 | Anderson Mesa | LONEOS | · | 1.3 km | MPC · JPL |
| 327721 | 2006 SQ_{157} | — | September 23, 2006 | Kitt Peak | Spacewatch | · | 1.1 km | MPC · JPL |
| 327722 | 2006 SV_{159} | — | September 23, 2006 | Kitt Peak | Spacewatch | · | 1.1 km | MPC · JPL |
| 327723 | 2006 SK_{161} | — | September 23, 2006 | Kitt Peak | Spacewatch | · | 870 m | MPC · JPL |
| 327724 | 2006 SX_{185} | — | September 25, 2006 | Mount Lemmon | Mount Lemmon Survey | · | 750 m | MPC · JPL |
| 327725 | 2006 SQ_{188} | — | September 26, 2006 | Kitt Peak | Spacewatch | MAS | 620 m | MPC · JPL |
| 327726 | 2006 SJ_{194} | — | September 26, 2006 | Kitt Peak | Spacewatch | · | 910 m | MPC · JPL |
| 327727 | 2006 SY_{204} | — | September 25, 2006 | Mount Lemmon | Mount Lemmon Survey | · | 850 m | MPC · JPL |
| 327728 | 2006 SB_{212} | — | September 26, 2006 | Mount Lemmon | Mount Lemmon Survey | · | 1.1 km | MPC · JPL |
| 327729 | 2006 SR_{214} | — | September 27, 2006 | Socorro | LINEAR | (2076) | 970 m | MPC · JPL |
| 327730 | 2006 SM_{279} | — | September 28, 2006 | Kitt Peak | Spacewatch | V | 760 m | MPC · JPL |
| 327731 | 2006 SE_{283} | — | September 26, 2006 | Socorro | LINEAR | · | 960 m | MPC · JPL |
| 327732 | 2006 SP_{283} | — | September 26, 2006 | Socorro | LINEAR | (2076) | 1.0 km | MPC · JPL |
| 327733 | 2006 SE_{300} | — | September 26, 2006 | Catalina | CSS | · | 1.5 km | MPC · JPL |
| 327734 | 2006 SP_{317} | — | September 27, 2006 | Kitt Peak | Spacewatch | · | 1.1 km | MPC · JPL |
| 327735 | 2006 ST_{322} | — | September 27, 2006 | Kitt Peak | Spacewatch | NYS | 1.4 km | MPC · JPL |
| 327736 | 2006 SG_{328} | — | September 27, 2006 | Kitt Peak | Spacewatch | · | 1 km | MPC · JPL |
| 327737 | 2006 SC_{336} | — | September 28, 2006 | Kitt Peak | Spacewatch | · | 1.2 km | MPC · JPL |
| 327738 | 2006 SC_{351} | — | September 30, 2006 | Catalina | CSS | · | 820 m | MPC · JPL |
| 327739 | 2006 SC_{353} | — | September 30, 2006 | Catalina | CSS | · | 840 m | MPC · JPL |
| 327740 | 2006 SG_{364} | — | September 28, 2006 | Mount Lemmon | Mount Lemmon Survey | V | 800 m | MPC · JPL |
| 327741 | 2006 SE_{365} | — | September 30, 2006 | Catalina | CSS | · | 1.3 km | MPC · JPL |
| 327742 | 2006 SH_{391} | — | September 18, 2006 | Catalina | CSS | · | 900 m | MPC · JPL |
| 327743 | 2006 TG_{2} | — | October 1, 2006 | Kitt Peak | Spacewatch | · | 890 m | MPC · JPL |
| 327744 | 2006 TM_{23} | — | October 11, 2006 | Kitt Peak | Spacewatch | · | 1.3 km | MPC · JPL |
| 327745 | 2006 TD_{29} | — | October 12, 2006 | Kitt Peak | Spacewatch | · | 770 m | MPC · JPL |
| 327746 | 2006 TO_{39} | — | October 12, 2006 | Kitt Peak | Spacewatch | EUN | 970 m | MPC · JPL |
| 327747 | 2006 TG_{50} | — | October 12, 2006 | Palomar | NEAT | V | 820 m | MPC · JPL |
| 327748 | 2006 TQ_{55} | — | October 12, 2006 | Palomar | NEAT | · | 860 m | MPC · JPL |
| 327749 | 2006 TA_{69} | — | October 11, 2006 | Palomar | NEAT | slow | 1.1 km | MPC · JPL |
| 327750 | 2006 TP_{70} | — | October 11, 2006 | Palomar | NEAT | · | 1.8 km | MPC · JPL |
| 327751 | 2006 TP_{72} | — | October 11, 2006 | Palomar | NEAT | · | 1.2 km | MPC · JPL |
| 327752 | 2006 TM_{75} | — | October 11, 2006 | Palomar | NEAT | · | 1.0 km | MPC · JPL |
| 327753 | 2006 TX_{77} | — | October 4, 2006 | Mount Lemmon | Mount Lemmon Survey | fast | 690 m | MPC · JPL |
| 327754 | 2006 TQ_{95} | — | October 12, 2006 | Kitt Peak | Spacewatch | · | 810 m | MPC · JPL |
| 327755 | 2006 TX_{123} | — | October 2, 2006 | Mount Lemmon | Mount Lemmon Survey | (2076) | 880 m | MPC · JPL |
| 327756 | 2006 TP_{127} | — | October 2, 2006 | Mount Lemmon | Mount Lemmon Survey | · | 1.2 km | MPC · JPL |
| 327757 | 2006 UW_{7} | — | October 16, 2006 | Catalina | CSS | ERI | 1.8 km | MPC · JPL |
| 327758 | 2006 UV_{13} | — | October 17, 2006 | Mount Lemmon | Mount Lemmon Survey | · | 1.3 km | MPC · JPL |
| 327759 | 2006 UZ_{27} | — | October 16, 2006 | Kitt Peak | Spacewatch | · | 920 m | MPC · JPL |
| 327760 | 2006 US_{36} | — | October 16, 2006 | Kitt Peak | Spacewatch | · | 1.3 km | MPC · JPL |
| 327761 | 2006 UL_{38} | — | October 16, 2006 | Kitt Peak | Spacewatch | · | 880 m | MPC · JPL |
| 327762 | 2006 UQ_{52} | — | October 17, 2006 | Catalina | CSS | · | 1.3 km | MPC · JPL |
| 327763 | 2006 UE_{53} | — | October 17, 2006 | Mount Lemmon | Mount Lemmon Survey | V | 790 m | MPC · JPL |
| 327764 | 2006 UL_{54} | — | October 17, 2006 | Catalina | CSS | T_{j} (2.96) | 5.7 km | MPC · JPL |
| 327765 | 2006 UU_{68} | — | October 16, 2006 | Catalina | CSS | · | 900 m | MPC · JPL |
| 327766 | 2006 UC_{69} | — | October 16, 2006 | Catalina | CSS | · | 870 m | MPC · JPL |
| 327767 | 2006 UD_{78} | — | October 17, 2006 | Kitt Peak | Spacewatch | · | 1.4 km | MPC · JPL |
| 327768 | 2006 UC_{79} | — | October 17, 2006 | Kitt Peak | Spacewatch | · | 860 m | MPC · JPL |
| 327769 | 2006 UY_{84} | — | October 17, 2006 | Mount Lemmon | Mount Lemmon Survey | · | 880 m | MPC · JPL |
| 327770 | 2006 UF_{87} | — | October 17, 2006 | Mount Lemmon | Mount Lemmon Survey | · | 1.2 km | MPC · JPL |
| 327771 | 2006 UK_{91} | — | October 18, 2006 | Bergisch Gladbach | W. Bickel | (2076) | 1.0 km | MPC · JPL |
| 327772 | 2006 UH_{92} | — | October 18, 2006 | Kitt Peak | Spacewatch | · | 940 m | MPC · JPL |
| 327773 | 2006 UW_{107} | — | October 18, 2006 | Kitt Peak | Spacewatch | CLA | 2.0 km | MPC · JPL |
| 327774 | 2006 UT_{118} | — | October 19, 2006 | Kitt Peak | Spacewatch | · | 1.1 km | MPC · JPL |
| 327775 | 2006 UW_{128} | — | October 19, 2006 | Kitt Peak | Spacewatch | · | 1.1 km | MPC · JPL |
| 327776 | 2006 UV_{132} | — | October 19, 2006 | Kitt Peak | Spacewatch | V | 610 m | MPC · JPL |
| 327777 | 2006 UC_{149} | — | October 20, 2006 | Kitt Peak | Spacewatch | · | 1.0 km | MPC · JPL |
| 327778 | 2006 UV_{156} | — | October 21, 2006 | Catalina | CSS | · | 880 m | MPC · JPL |
| 327779 | 2006 UC_{175} | — | October 16, 2006 | Catalina | CSS | CLA | 2.0 km | MPC · JPL |
| 327780 | 2006 UL_{177} | — | October 16, 2006 | Catalina | CSS | · | 1.1 km | MPC · JPL |
| 327781 | 2006 US_{179} | — | October 16, 2006 | Catalina | CSS | · | 850 m | MPC · JPL |
| 327782 | 2006 UD_{181} | — | October 16, 2006 | Catalina | CSS | V | 650 m | MPC · JPL |
| 327783 | 2006 UJ_{182} | — | October 16, 2006 | Catalina | CSS | · | 1.4 km | MPC · JPL |
| 327784 | 2006 UW_{183} | — | October 19, 2006 | Catalina | CSS | · | 1.4 km | MPC · JPL |
| 327785 | 2006 UL_{184} | — | October 19, 2006 | Catalina | CSS | · | 1.2 km | MPC · JPL |
| 327786 | 2006 UO_{195} | — | October 20, 2006 | Kitt Peak | Spacewatch | · | 1.4 km | MPC · JPL |
| 327787 | 2006 UF_{196} | — | October 20, 2006 | Kitt Peak | Spacewatch | · | 1.4 km | MPC · JPL |
| 327788 | 2006 UT_{198} | — | October 20, 2006 | Kitt Peak | Spacewatch | (5) | 1.2 km | MPC · JPL |
| 327789 | 2006 UM_{220} | — | October 17, 2006 | Kitt Peak | Spacewatch | · | 840 m | MPC · JPL |
| 327790 | 2006 UH_{223} | — | October 17, 2006 | Catalina | CSS | · | 1.3 km | MPC · JPL |
| 327791 | 2006 UU_{227} | — | October 3, 2006 | Mount Lemmon | Mount Lemmon Survey | · | 1.5 km | MPC · JPL |
| 327792 | 2006 UD_{231} | — | October 21, 2006 | Palomar | NEAT | · | 1.2 km | MPC · JPL |
| 327793 | 2006 UT_{253} | — | October 27, 2006 | Mount Lemmon | Mount Lemmon Survey | · | 1.3 km | MPC · JPL |
| 327794 | 2006 UB_{266} | — | October 27, 2006 | Catalina | CSS | · | 3.7 km | MPC · JPL |
| 327795 | 2006 UC_{280} | — | October 28, 2006 | Mount Lemmon | Mount Lemmon Survey | · | 1.1 km | MPC · JPL |
| 327796 | 2006 UU_{281} | — | October 28, 2006 | Mount Lemmon | Mount Lemmon Survey | · | 1.2 km | MPC · JPL |
| 327797 | 2006 UO_{282} | — | October 28, 2006 | Mount Lemmon | Mount Lemmon Survey | V | 780 m | MPC · JPL |
| 327798 | 2006 UY_{335} | — | October 19, 2006 | Mount Lemmon | Mount Lemmon Survey | · | 1.5 km | MPC · JPL |
| 327799 | 2006 UN_{337} | — | October 16, 2006 | Catalina | CSS | · | 1.6 km | MPC · JPL |
| 327800 | 2006 VU | — | November 1, 2006 | Mount Lemmon | Mount Lemmon Survey | MAS | 870 m | MPC · JPL |

== 327801–327900 ==
back to top

| Designation | | | Discovery | | | Properties | | Ref |
| Permanent | Provisional | Named after | Date | Site | Discoverer(s) | Category | Diam. | Ref |
|---|---|---|---|---|---|---|---|---|
| 327801 | 2006 VD_{5} | — | November 10, 2006 | Kitt Peak | Spacewatch | · | 820 m | MPC · JPL |
| 327802 | 2006 VM_{19} | — | October 19, 2006 | Kitt Peak | Spacewatch | V | 860 m | MPC · JPL |
| 327803 | 2006 VF_{22} | — | November 10, 2006 | Kitt Peak | Spacewatch | · | 1.3 km | MPC · JPL |
| 327804 | 2006 VH_{22} | — | November 10, 2006 | Kitt Peak | Spacewatch | V | 760 m | MPC · JPL |
| 327805 | 2006 VB_{25} | — | November 10, 2006 | Kitt Peak | Spacewatch | · | 1.5 km | MPC · JPL |
| 327806 | 2006 VD_{28} | — | November 10, 2006 | Kitt Peak | Spacewatch | · | 4.6 km | MPC · JPL |
| 327807 | 2006 VP_{29} | — | November 10, 2006 | Kitt Peak | Spacewatch | (5) | 1.2 km | MPC · JPL |
| 327808 | 2006 VX_{34} | — | October 20, 2006 | Kitt Peak | Spacewatch | · | 1.3 km | MPC · JPL |
| 327809 | 2006 VS_{38} | — | November 12, 2006 | Mount Lemmon | Mount Lemmon Survey | · | 1.5 km | MPC · JPL |
| 327810 | 2006 VG_{50} | — | November 10, 2006 | Kitt Peak | Spacewatch | · | 1.8 km | MPC · JPL |
| 327811 | 2006 VA_{51} | — | November 10, 2006 | Kitt Peak | Spacewatch | · | 1.5 km | MPC · JPL |
| 327812 | 2006 VG_{63} | — | November 11, 2006 | Kitt Peak | Spacewatch | · | 1.4 km | MPC · JPL |
| 327813 | 2006 VQ_{72} | — | October 19, 2006 | Mount Lemmon | Mount Lemmon Survey | · | 1.7 km | MPC · JPL |
| 327814 | 2006 VZ_{74} | — | November 11, 2006 | Mount Lemmon | Mount Lemmon Survey | · | 1.5 km | MPC · JPL |
| 327815 | 2006 VD_{81} | — | November 12, 2006 | Mount Lemmon | Mount Lemmon Survey | · | 1.6 km | MPC · JPL |
| 327816 | 2006 VW_{104} | — | November 13, 2006 | Kitt Peak | Spacewatch | · | 1.7 km | MPC · JPL |
| 327817 | 2006 VX_{132} | — | November 15, 2006 | Kitt Peak | Spacewatch | · | 730 m | MPC · JPL |
| 327818 | 2006 VZ_{151} | — | November 9, 2006 | Palomar | NEAT | · | 860 m | MPC · JPL |
| 327819 | 2006 VJ_{152} | — | November 9, 2006 | Palomar | NEAT | · | 1.6 km | MPC · JPL |
| 327820 | 2006 VF_{155} | — | November 13, 2006 | Catalina | CSS | · | 1.2 km | MPC · JPL |
| 327821 | 2006 VF_{171} | — | November 10, 2006 | Kitt Peak | Spacewatch | V | 840 m | MPC · JPL |
| 327822 | 2006 WU_{18} | — | November 17, 2006 | Kitt Peak | Spacewatch | V · slow | 820 m | MPC · JPL |
| 327823 | 2006 WF_{22} | — | November 17, 2006 | Mount Lemmon | Mount Lemmon Survey | · | 1.3 km | MPC · JPL |
| 327824 | 2006 WF_{23} | — | November 17, 2006 | Mount Lemmon | Mount Lemmon Survey | (5) | 1.2 km | MPC · JPL |
| 327825 | 2006 WU_{24} | — | November 17, 2006 | Mount Lemmon | Mount Lemmon Survey | · | 2.1 km | MPC · JPL |
| 327826 | 2006 WY_{30} | — | November 16, 2006 | Kitt Peak | Spacewatch | · | 1.1 km | MPC · JPL |
| 327827 | 2006 WE_{42} | — | November 16, 2006 | Mount Lemmon | Mount Lemmon Survey | · | 1.2 km | MPC · JPL |
| 327828 | 2006 WM_{46} | — | November 16, 2006 | Kitt Peak | Spacewatch | · | 1.4 km | MPC · JPL |
| 327829 | 2006 WH_{48} | — | November 16, 2006 | Kitt Peak | Spacewatch | · | 1.4 km | MPC · JPL |
| 327830 | 2006 WV_{55} | — | November 16, 2006 | Mount Lemmon | Mount Lemmon Survey | ADE | 2.2 km | MPC · JPL |
| 327831 | 2006 WF_{61} | — | November 17, 2006 | Mount Lemmon | Mount Lemmon Survey | · | 960 m | MPC · JPL |
| 327832 | 2006 WU_{67} | — | November 17, 2006 | Kitt Peak | Spacewatch | · | 1.4 km | MPC · JPL |
| 327833 | 2006 WN_{68} | — | November 17, 2006 | Mount Lemmon | Mount Lemmon Survey | · | 1.5 km | MPC · JPL |
| 327834 | 2006 WT_{70} | — | November 18, 2006 | Kitt Peak | Spacewatch | · | 1.5 km | MPC · JPL |
| 327835 | 2006 WZ_{81} | — | November 18, 2006 | Socorro | LINEAR | · | 1.9 km | MPC · JPL |
| 327836 | 2006 WA_{82} | — | November 18, 2006 | Kitt Peak | Spacewatch | MIS | 2.2 km | MPC · JPL |
| 327837 | 2006 WE_{85} | — | September 27, 2006 | Mount Lemmon | Mount Lemmon Survey | (5) | 1.3 km | MPC · JPL |
| 327838 | 2006 WM_{86} | — | November 18, 2006 | Socorro | LINEAR | · | 2.2 km | MPC · JPL |
| 327839 | 2006 WC_{89} | — | November 18, 2006 | Socorro | LINEAR | · | 2.3 km | MPC · JPL |
| 327840 | 2006 WG_{95} | — | November 19, 2006 | Kitt Peak | Spacewatch | · | 980 m | MPC · JPL |
| 327841 | 2006 WH_{106} | — | November 19, 2006 | Kitt Peak | Spacewatch | · | 1.3 km | MPC · JPL |
| 327842 | 2006 WQ_{125} | — | November 22, 2006 | Socorro | LINEAR | · | 3.4 km | MPC · JPL |
| 327843 | 2006 WS_{189} | — | November 15, 2006 | Catalina | CSS | · | 2.2 km | MPC · JPL |
| 327844 | 2006 WL_{192} | — | November 27, 2006 | Mount Lemmon | Mount Lemmon Survey | · | 1.4 km | MPC · JPL |
| 327845 | 2006 WC_{194} | — | November 27, 2006 | Kitt Peak | Spacewatch | · | 1.2 km | MPC · JPL |
| 327846 | 2006 WC_{199} | — | November 17, 2006 | Kitt Peak | Spacewatch | · | 1.4 km | MPC · JPL |
| 327847 | 2006 WQ_{202} | — | November 27, 2006 | Mount Lemmon | Mount Lemmon Survey | · | 2.2 km | MPC · JPL |
| 327848 | 2006 XN_{1} | — | December 11, 2006 | 7300 | W. K. Y. Yeung | MAS | 740 m | MPC · JPL |
| 327849 | 2006 XA_{8} | — | December 9, 2006 | Palomar | NEAT | · | 2.0 km | MPC · JPL |
| 327850 | 2006 XC_{24} | — | December 12, 2006 | Anderson Mesa | LONEOS | (5) | 1.6 km | MPC · JPL |
| 327851 | 2006 XC_{43} | — | December 12, 2006 | Mount Lemmon | Mount Lemmon Survey | NYS | 1.8 km | MPC · JPL |
| 327852 | 2006 XN_{50} | — | December 13, 2006 | Mount Lemmon | Mount Lemmon Survey | PHO | 1.1 km | MPC · JPL |
| 327853 | 2006 XR_{50} | — | December 13, 2006 | Mount Lemmon | Mount Lemmon Survey | · | 1.6 km | MPC · JPL |
| 327854 | 2006 XK_{54} | — | December 15, 2006 | Socorro | LINEAR | JUN | 1.3 km | MPC · JPL |
| 327855 | 2006 XL_{55} | — | November 16, 2006 | Mount Lemmon | Mount Lemmon Survey | · | 2.2 km | MPC · JPL |
| 327856 | 2006 XU_{60} | — | December 14, 2006 | Kitt Peak | Spacewatch | · | 1.8 km | MPC · JPL |
| 327857 | 2006 XF_{65} | — | December 12, 2006 | Palomar | NEAT | MAR | 1.3 km | MPC · JPL |
| 327858 | 2006 XN_{71} | — | December 13, 2006 | Mount Lemmon | Mount Lemmon Survey | · | 1.5 km | MPC · JPL |
| 327859 | 2006 YA_{4} | — | December 16, 2006 | Mount Lemmon | Mount Lemmon Survey | · | 1.6 km | MPC · JPL |
| 327860 | 2006 YX_{9} | — | December 21, 2006 | Kitt Peak | Spacewatch | · | 1.2 km | MPC · JPL |
| 327861 | 2006 YO_{10} | — | December 21, 2006 | Anderson Mesa | LONEOS | · | 2.6 km | MPC · JPL |
| 327862 | 2006 YM_{14} | — | December 26, 2006 | Vail-Jarnac | Jarnac | (5) | 1.5 km | MPC · JPL |
| 327863 | 2006 YC_{20} | — | October 27, 2006 | Catalina | CSS | · | 1.9 km | MPC · JPL |
| 327864 | 2006 YV_{34} | — | December 21, 2006 | Kitt Peak | Spacewatch | · | 1.8 km | MPC · JPL |
| 327865 | 2006 YN_{35} | — | December 21, 2006 | Kitt Peak | Spacewatch | EUN | 1.4 km | MPC · JPL |
| 327866 | 2006 YV_{35} | — | December 21, 2006 | Kitt Peak | Spacewatch | · | 2.1 km | MPC · JPL |
| 327867 | 2006 YA_{50} | — | December 21, 2006 | Kitt Peak | M. W. Buie | EUN | 1.3 km | MPC · JPL |
| 327868 | 2006 YB_{51} | — | December 26, 2006 | Catalina | CSS | · | 2.1 km | MPC · JPL |
| 327869 | 2006 YB_{52} | — | December 21, 2006 | Kitt Peak | M. W. Buie | · | 1.9 km | MPC · JPL |
| 327870 | 2006 YL_{54} | — | December 21, 2006 | Mount Lemmon | Mount Lemmon Survey | · | 1.7 km | MPC · JPL |
| 327871 | 2007 AN_{3} | — | January 8, 2007 | Kitt Peak | Spacewatch | · | 1.8 km | MPC · JPL |
| 327872 | 2007 AR_{3} | — | January 8, 2007 | Kitt Peak | Spacewatch | (5) | 1.3 km | MPC · JPL |
| 327873 | 2007 AH_{7} | — | January 9, 2007 | Kitt Peak | Spacewatch | · | 2.9 km | MPC · JPL |
| 327874 | 2007 AQ_{12} | — | January 15, 2007 | Kitt Peak | Spacewatch | · | 1.9 km | MPC · JPL |
| 327875 | 2007 AJ_{17} | — | January 15, 2007 | Catalina | CSS | · | 1.9 km | MPC · JPL |
| 327876 | 2007 AO_{17} | — | January 15, 2007 | Catalina | CSS | · | 2.2 km | MPC · JPL |
| 327877 | 2007 AC_{18} | — | January 8, 2007 | Catalina | CSS | · | 1.5 km | MPC · JPL |
| 327878 | 2007 AY_{20} | — | January 10, 2007 | Mount Lemmon | Mount Lemmon Survey | AEO | 1.3 km | MPC · JPL |
| 327879 | 2007 AT_{27} | — | January 10, 2007 | Mount Lemmon | Mount Lemmon Survey | · | 1.4 km | MPC · JPL |
| 327880 | 2007 AB_{29} | — | January 10, 2007 | Mount Lemmon | Mount Lemmon Survey | · | 1.8 km | MPC · JPL |
| 327881 | 2007 AP_{30} | — | January 10, 2007 | Mount Lemmon | Mount Lemmon Survey | · | 2.1 km | MPC · JPL |
| 327882 | 2007 AE_{31} | — | January 15, 2007 | Kitt Peak | Spacewatch | · | 1.9 km | MPC · JPL |
| 327883 | 2007 BB_{5} | — | January 17, 2007 | Kitt Peak | Spacewatch | (5) | 1.4 km | MPC · JPL |
| 327884 | 2007 BX_{6} | — | January 17, 2007 | Kitt Peak | Spacewatch | · | 2.8 km | MPC · JPL |
| 327885 | 2007 BB_{34} | — | January 24, 2007 | Mount Lemmon | Mount Lemmon Survey | · | 1.4 km | MPC · JPL |
| 327886 | 2007 BF_{34} | — | January 24, 2007 | Mount Lemmon | Mount Lemmon Survey | · | 1.1 km | MPC · JPL |
| 327887 | 2007 BM_{35} | — | January 24, 2007 | Mount Lemmon | Mount Lemmon Survey | EUN | 1.2 km | MPC · JPL |
| 327888 | 2007 BD_{36} | — | January 24, 2007 | Mount Lemmon | Mount Lemmon Survey | · | 1.3 km | MPC · JPL |
| 327889 | 2007 BD_{38} | — | October 22, 2006 | Mount Lemmon | Mount Lemmon Survey | · | 1.7 km | MPC · JPL |
| 327890 | 2007 BP_{38} | — | January 24, 2007 | Catalina | CSS | · | 2.3 km | MPC · JPL |
| 327891 | 2007 BQ_{47} | — | January 26, 2007 | Kitt Peak | Spacewatch | AGN | 1.2 km | MPC · JPL |
| 327892 | 2007 BL_{49} | — | January 22, 2007 | Lulin | Lin, H.-C., Q. Ye | · | 2.2 km | MPC · JPL |
| 327893 | 2007 BC_{58} | — | January 24, 2007 | Catalina | CSS | · | 1.9 km | MPC · JPL |
| 327894 | 2007 BU_{58} | — | January 24, 2007 | Catalina | CSS | AEO | 1.3 km | MPC · JPL |
| 327895 | 2007 BO_{59} | — | January 25, 2007 | Catalina | CSS | (5) | 1.4 km | MPC · JPL |
| 327896 | 2007 BH_{63} | — | January 27, 2007 | Mount Lemmon | Mount Lemmon Survey | · | 1.5 km | MPC · JPL |
| 327897 | 2007 BH_{74} | — | January 17, 2007 | Kitt Peak | Spacewatch | · | 2.1 km | MPC · JPL |
| 327898 | 2007 BS_{88} | — | December 13, 2006 | Mount Lemmon | Mount Lemmon Survey | · | 1.6 km | MPC · JPL |
| 327899 | 2007 BH_{102} | — | January 28, 2007 | Kitt Peak | Spacewatch | · | 2.3 km | MPC · JPL |
| 327900 | 2007 CP_{27} | — | February 6, 2007 | Kitt Peak | Spacewatch | · | 1.7 km | MPC · JPL |

== 327901–328000 ==
back to top

| Designation | | | Discovery | | | Properties | | Ref |
| Permanent | Provisional | Named after | Date | Site | Discoverer(s) | Category | Diam. | Ref |
|---|---|---|---|---|---|---|---|---|
| 327901 | 2007 CQ_{31} | — | January 9, 2007 | Mount Lemmon | Mount Lemmon Survey | · | 1.8 km | MPC · JPL |
| 327902 | 2007 CX_{38} | — | February 6, 2007 | Mount Lemmon | Mount Lemmon Survey | · | 1.9 km | MPC · JPL |
| 327903 | 2007 CL_{39} | — | February 6, 2007 | Mount Lemmon | Mount Lemmon Survey | · | 1.7 km | MPC · JPL |
| 327904 | 2007 CZ_{50} | — | February 13, 2007 | Marly | P. Kocher | · | 1.7 km | MPC · JPL |
| 327905 | 2007 CX_{51} | — | February 9, 2007 | Catalina | CSS | · | 2.0 km | MPC · JPL |
| 327906 | 2007 CR_{56} | — | February 15, 2007 | Catalina | CSS | EUN | 1.5 km | MPC · JPL |
| 327907 | 2007 CQ_{58} | — | February 10, 2007 | Catalina | CSS | · | 3.1 km | MPC · JPL |
| 327908 | 2007 CV_{78} | — | February 8, 2007 | Kitt Peak | Spacewatch | · | 2.1 km | MPC · JPL |
| 327909 | 2007 CK_{79} | — | February 9, 2007 | Catalina | CSS | DOR | 2.7 km | MPC · JPL |
| 327910 | 2007 DU_{4} | — | February 17, 2007 | Kitt Peak | Spacewatch | · | 1.5 km | MPC · JPL |
| 327911 | 2007 DC_{12} | — | February 16, 2007 | Catalina | CSS | · | 2.4 km | MPC · JPL |
| 327912 | 2007 DQ_{12} | — | February 16, 2007 | Catalina | CSS | · | 2.7 km | MPC · JPL |
| 327913 | 2007 DA_{14} | — | February 17, 2007 | Kitt Peak | Spacewatch | · | 1.3 km | MPC · JPL |
| 327914 | 2007 DP_{21} | — | February 17, 2007 | Kitt Peak | Spacewatch | · | 2.6 km | MPC · JPL |
| 327915 | 2007 DH_{23} | — | February 17, 2007 | Kitt Peak | Spacewatch | · | 2.9 km | MPC · JPL |
| 327916 | 2007 DT_{24} | — | February 17, 2007 | Kitt Peak | Spacewatch | · | 2.2 km | MPC · JPL |
| 327917 | 2007 DJ_{25} | — | February 17, 2007 | Kitt Peak | Spacewatch | · | 2.1 km | MPC · JPL |
| 327918 | 2007 DZ_{26} | — | February 17, 2007 | Kitt Peak | Spacewatch | · | 1.9 km | MPC · JPL |
| 327919 | 2007 DX_{27} | — | February 17, 2007 | Kitt Peak | Spacewatch | · | 2.5 km | MPC · JPL |
| 327920 | 2007 DV_{29} | — | February 17, 2007 | Kitt Peak | Spacewatch | · | 1.8 km | MPC · JPL |
| 327921 | 2007 DX_{31} | — | February 17, 2007 | Kitt Peak | Spacewatch | · | 3.6 km | MPC · JPL |
| 327922 | 2007 DW_{36} | — | February 17, 2007 | Kitt Peak | Spacewatch | · | 2.0 km | MPC · JPL |
| 327923 | 2007 DN_{42} | — | February 17, 2007 | Kitt Peak | Spacewatch | · | 1.5 km | MPC · JPL |
| 327924 | 2007 DK_{43} | — | February 17, 2007 | Catalina | CSS | GEF | 1.9 km | MPC · JPL |
| 327925 | 2007 DK_{47} | — | February 21, 2007 | Mount Lemmon | Mount Lemmon Survey | AGN | 1.6 km | MPC · JPL |
| 327926 | 2007 DF_{49} | — | February 23, 2007 | Altschwendt | W. Ries | · | 3.0 km | MPC · JPL |
| 327927 | 2007 DH_{51} | — | February 17, 2007 | Catalina | CSS | · | 2.9 km | MPC · JPL |
| 327928 | 2007 DY_{59} | — | February 22, 2007 | Socorro | LINEAR | · | 2.9 km | MPC · JPL |
| 327929 | 2007 DU_{63} | — | February 21, 2007 | Kitt Peak | Spacewatch | · | 1.7 km | MPC · JPL |
| 327930 | 2007 DT_{67} | — | February 21, 2007 | Kitt Peak | Spacewatch | · | 1.6 km | MPC · JPL |
| 327931 | 2007 DK_{74} | — | February 21, 2007 | Mount Lemmon | Mount Lemmon Survey | · | 2.0 km | MPC · JPL |
| 327932 | 2007 DL_{78} | — | February 23, 2007 | Socorro | LINEAR | · | 2.1 km | MPC · JPL |
| 327933 | 2007 DW_{78} | — | February 23, 2007 | Kitt Peak | Spacewatch | · | 1.8 km | MPC · JPL |
| 327934 | 2007 DX_{90} | — | February 23, 2007 | Mount Lemmon | Mount Lemmon Survey | · | 1.8 km | MPC · JPL |
| 327935 | 2007 DV_{98} | — | February 25, 2007 | Mount Lemmon | Mount Lemmon Survey | DOR | 2.3 km | MPC · JPL |
| 327936 | 2007 DX_{110} | — | February 23, 2007 | Mount Lemmon | Mount Lemmon Survey | · | 1.9 km | MPC · JPL |
| 327937 | 2007 DE_{113} | — | February 17, 2007 | Kitt Peak | Spacewatch | HOF | 3.1 km | MPC · JPL |
| 327938 | 2007 EX_{5} | — | March 9, 2007 | Mount Lemmon | Mount Lemmon Survey | AEO | 1.3 km | MPC · JPL |
| 327939 | 2007 EY_{10} | — | March 9, 2007 | Kitt Peak | Spacewatch | · | 2.1 km | MPC · JPL |
| 327940 | 2007 EW_{13} | — | March 9, 2007 | Kitt Peak | Spacewatch | · | 1.8 km | MPC · JPL |
| 327941 | 2007 EQ_{14} | — | March 9, 2007 | Mount Lemmon | Mount Lemmon Survey | · | 2.3 km | MPC · JPL |
| 327942 | 2007 EX_{18} | — | March 10, 2007 | Kitt Peak | Spacewatch | · | 2.6 km | MPC · JPL |
| 327943 Xavierbarcons | 2007 EQ_{26} | Xavierbarcons | March 9, 2007 | Vallemare Borbona | V. S. Casulli | · | 2.3 km | MPC · JPL |
| 327944 | 2007 EW_{29} | — | March 9, 2007 | Kitt Peak | Spacewatch | · | 1.9 km | MPC · JPL |
| 327945 | 2007 ED_{30} | — | March 9, 2007 | Palomar | NEAT | · | 2.3 km | MPC · JPL |
| 327946 | 2007 EO_{37} | — | March 11, 2007 | Mount Lemmon | Mount Lemmon Survey | · | 2.6 km | MPC · JPL |
| 327947 | 2007 EJ_{38} | — | March 11, 2007 | Mount Lemmon | Mount Lemmon Survey | · | 2.2 km | MPC · JPL |
| 327948 | 2007 ET_{46} | — | March 9, 2007 | Mount Lemmon | Mount Lemmon Survey | (31811) | 3.4 km | MPC · JPL |
| 327949 | 2007 EE_{54} | — | March 11, 2007 | Mount Lemmon | Mount Lemmon Survey | · | 1.9 km | MPC · JPL |
| 327950 | 2007 EW_{62} | — | March 10, 2007 | Kitt Peak | Spacewatch | · | 2.8 km | MPC · JPL |
| 327951 | 2007 EO_{72} | — | March 10, 2007 | Kitt Peak | Spacewatch | · | 2.5 km | MPC · JPL |
| 327952 | 2007 EP_{76} | — | March 10, 2007 | Kitt Peak | Spacewatch | · | 2.3 km | MPC · JPL |
| 327953 | 2007 EQ_{81} | — | October 28, 2005 | Mount Lemmon | Mount Lemmon Survey | · | 1.6 km | MPC · JPL |
| 327954 | 2007 ES_{104} | — | March 11, 2007 | Mount Lemmon | Mount Lemmon Survey | HOF | 2.5 km | MPC · JPL |
| 327955 | 2007 EC_{110} | — | March 11, 2007 | Kitt Peak | Spacewatch | · | 2.2 km | MPC · JPL |
| 327956 | 2007 EG_{132} | — | March 9, 2007 | Mount Lemmon | Mount Lemmon Survey | EUN | 1.3 km | MPC · JPL |
| 327957 | 2007 EN_{134} | — | March 10, 2007 | Kitt Peak | Spacewatch | · | 2.1 km | MPC · JPL |
| 327958 | 2007 EH_{139} | — | March 12, 2007 | Kitt Peak | Spacewatch | · | 2.0 km | MPC · JPL |
| 327959 | 2007 EQ_{146} | — | March 12, 2007 | Mount Lemmon | Mount Lemmon Survey | · | 1.9 km | MPC · JPL |
| 327960 | 2007 EF_{148} | — | March 12, 2007 | Mount Lemmon | Mount Lemmon Survey | · | 2.1 km | MPC · JPL |
| 327961 | 2007 EB_{149} | — | March 12, 2007 | Mount Lemmon | Mount Lemmon Survey | HOF | 3.0 km | MPC · JPL |
| 327962 | 2007 EJ_{151} | — | March 12, 2007 | Mount Lemmon | Mount Lemmon Survey | · | 2.3 km | MPC · JPL |
| 327963 | 2007 EP_{158} | — | April 4, 2003 | Kitt Peak | Spacewatch | (12739) | 1.9 km | MPC · JPL |
| 327964 | 2007 EG_{159} | — | March 14, 2007 | Mount Lemmon | Mount Lemmon Survey | · | 1.4 km | MPC · JPL |
| 327965 | 2007 EV_{166} | — | March 11, 2007 | Mount Lemmon | Mount Lemmon Survey | · | 2.9 km | MPC · JPL |
| 327966 | 2007 EP_{189} | — | March 13, 2007 | Mount Lemmon | Mount Lemmon Survey | · | 1.6 km | MPC · JPL |
| 327967 | 2007 EH_{205} | — | March 11, 2007 | Kitt Peak | Spacewatch | · | 2.2 km | MPC · JPL |
| 327968 | 2007 EB_{210} | — | March 8, 2007 | Palomar | NEAT | · | 1.8 km | MPC · JPL |
| 327969 | 2007 EA_{221} | — | March 13, 2007 | Kitt Peak | Spacewatch | EOS | 1.8 km | MPC · JPL |
| 327970 | 2007 FD_{7} | — | March 16, 2007 | Mount Lemmon | Mount Lemmon Survey | · | 1.8 km | MPC · JPL |
| 327971 | 2007 FH_{8} | — | March 16, 2007 | Mount Lemmon | Mount Lemmon Survey | HOF | 2.4 km | MPC · JPL |
| 327972 | 2007 FH_{15} | — | March 16, 2007 | Kitt Peak | Spacewatch | DOR | 2.8 km | MPC · JPL |
| 327973 | 2007 FM_{22} | — | March 20, 2007 | Kitt Peak | Spacewatch | · | 4.3 km | MPC · JPL |
| 327974 | 2007 FN_{26} | — | March 20, 2007 | Kitt Peak | Spacewatch | HOF | 2.4 km | MPC · JPL |
| 327975 | 2007 FJ_{30} | — | March 20, 2007 | Mount Lemmon | Mount Lemmon Survey | · | 2.1 km | MPC · JPL |
| 327976 | 2007 FP_{33} | — | March 25, 2007 | Mount Lemmon | Mount Lemmon Survey | AGN | 1.3 km | MPC · JPL |
| 327977 Skarga | 2007 FO_{34} | Skarga | March 24, 2007 | Moletai | K. Černis, J. Zdanavičius | · | 3.1 km | MPC · JPL |
| 327978 | 2007 FS_{39} | — | March 17, 2007 | Anderson Mesa | LONEOS | · | 3.0 km | MPC · JPL |
| 327979 | 2007 FT_{45} | — | March 16, 2007 | Catalina | CSS | · | 3.0 km | MPC · JPL |
| 327980 | 2007 FX_{45} | — | March 16, 2007 | Mount Lemmon | Mount Lemmon Survey | TEL | 1.7 km | MPC · JPL |
| 327981 | 2007 FC_{47} | — | March 20, 2007 | Mount Lemmon | Mount Lemmon Survey | · | 1.6 km | MPC · JPL |
| 327982 Balducci | 2007 GE_{2} | Balducci | April 10, 2007 | Vallemare Borbona | V. S. Casulli | · | 2.3 km | MPC · JPL |
| 327983 | 2007 GD_{12} | — | April 11, 2007 | Kitt Peak | Spacewatch | · | 4.8 km | MPC · JPL |
| 327984 | 2007 GL_{20} | — | April 11, 2007 | Mount Lemmon | Mount Lemmon Survey | · | 2.8 km | MPC · JPL |
| 327985 | 2007 GY_{21} | — | April 11, 2007 | Mount Lemmon | Mount Lemmon Survey | · | 2.8 km | MPC · JPL |
| 327986 | 2007 GK_{22} | — | April 11, 2007 | Mount Lemmon | Mount Lemmon Survey | EOS | 2.3 km | MPC · JPL |
| 327987 | 2007 GP_{22} | — | April 11, 2007 | Mount Lemmon | Mount Lemmon Survey | NAE | 3.3 km | MPC · JPL |
| 327988 | 2007 GR_{22} | — | April 11, 2007 | Mount Lemmon | Mount Lemmon Survey | · | 2.3 km | MPC · JPL |
| 327989 Howieglatter | 2007 GC_{32} | Howieglatter | April 10, 2007 | Charleston | Astronomical Research Observatory | · | 2.9 km | MPC · JPL |
| 327990 | 2007 GJ_{33} | — | April 11, 2007 | Mount Lemmon | Mount Lemmon Survey | · | 1.6 km | MPC · JPL |
| 327991 | 2007 GM_{38} | — | April 14, 2007 | Kitt Peak | Spacewatch | · | 2.7 km | MPC · JPL |
| 327992 | 2007 GK_{40} | — | April 14, 2007 | Kitt Peak | Spacewatch | · | 5.2 km | MPC · JPL |
| 327993 | 2007 GP_{42} | — | April 14, 2007 | Kitt Peak | Spacewatch | THM | 2.0 km | MPC · JPL |
| 327994 | 2007 GQ_{48} | — | April 14, 2007 | Kitt Peak | Spacewatch | EOS | 3.0 km | MPC · JPL |
| 327995 | 2007 GV_{52} | — | April 14, 2007 | Kitt Peak | Spacewatch | EOS | 2.1 km | MPC · JPL |
| 327996 | 2007 GQ_{57} | — | April 15, 2007 | Kitt Peak | Spacewatch | TIR | 3.1 km | MPC · JPL |
| 327997 | 2007 GU_{59} | — | April 15, 2007 | Kitt Peak | Spacewatch | · | 2.5 km | MPC · JPL |
| 327998 | 2007 GG_{62} | — | September 14, 1998 | Kitt Peak | Spacewatch | EOS | 1.9 km | MPC · JPL |
| 327999 | 2007 GL_{64} | — | April 15, 2007 | Kitt Peak | Spacewatch | · | 4.7 km | MPC · JPL |
| 328000 | 2007 GW_{66} | — | April 15, 2007 | Kitt Peak | Spacewatch | EOS | 1.9 km | MPC · JPL |

back to top

== See also ==
- Meanings of minor-planet names: 327001–328000
