= List of minor planets: 326001–327000 =

The following is a partial list of minor planets, running from minor-planet number 326001 through 327000, inclusive. The primary data for this and other partial lists is based on JPL's "Small-Body Orbital Elements" and data available from the Minor Planet Center. Critical list information is also provided by the MPC, unless otherwise specified from Lowell Observatory. A detailed description of the table's columns and additional sources are given on the main page including a complete list of every page in this series, and a statistical break-up on the dynamical classification of minor planets.

Also see the summary list of all named bodies in numerical and alphabetical order, and the corresponding naming citations for the number range of this particular list. New namings may only be added to this list after official publication, as the preannouncement of names is condemned by the Working Group for Small Bodies Nomenclature of the International Astronomical Union.

Near-Earth obj.	MBA (inner)	MBA (outer)	Centaur
Mars-crosser	MBA (middle)	Jupiter trojan	Trans-Neptunian obj.
Unclassified

== 326001–326100 ==
Designation			Discovery			Properties		Ref
Permanent	Provisional	Named after	Date	Site	Discoverer(s)	Category	Diam.	Ref
326001	2010 WA_{17}	—	April 24, 2003	Anderson Mesa	LONEOS	·	1.7 km	MPC · JPL
326002	2010 WK_{19}	—	October 9, 2005	Kitt Peak	Spacewatch	·	1.6 km	MPC · JPL
326003	2010 WU_{20}	—	April 17, 2001	Kitt Peak	Spacewatch	·	1.4 km	MPC · JPL
326004	2010 WV_{22}	—	March 15, 2007	Mount Lemmon	Mount Lemmon Survey	·	3.7 km	MPC · JPL
326005	2010 WQ_{23}	—	January 27, 2007	Mount Lemmon	Mount Lemmon Survey	HOF	2.7 km	MPC · JPL
326006	2010 WB_{24}	—	November 16, 2001	Kitt Peak	Spacewatch	·	1.5 km	MPC · JPL
326007	2010 WS_{25}	—	April 16, 2005	Kitt Peak	Spacewatch	·	910 m	MPC · JPL
326008	2010 WR_{29}	—	December 22, 2006	Kitt Peak	Spacewatch	·	1.9 km	MPC · JPL
326009	2010 WZ_{33}	—	December 17, 2003	Kitt Peak	Spacewatch	·	1.2 km	MPC · JPL
326010	2010 WL_{47}	—	September 14, 2006	Catalina	CSS	·	870 m	MPC · JPL
326011	2010 WM_{52}	—	December 27, 2006	Mount Lemmon	Mount Lemmon Survey	HOF	3.0 km	MPC · JPL
326012	2010 WE_{53}	—	October 5, 2002	Socorro	LINEAR	V	790 m	MPC · JPL
326013	2010 WR_{54}	—	September 20, 2003	Campo Imperatore	CINEOS	·	960 m	MPC · JPL
326014	2010 WJ_{55}	—	November 6, 2005	Mount Lemmon	Mount Lemmon Survey	·	2.8 km	MPC · JPL
326015	2010 WW_{55}	—	December 14, 2004	Kitt Peak	Spacewatch	·	4.3 km	MPC · JPL
326016	2010 WA_{62}	—	October 6, 2005	Mount Lemmon	Mount Lemmon Survey	·	1.5 km	MPC · JPL
326017	2010 WH_{62}	—	November 1, 1997	Kitt Peak	Spacewatch	·	1.4 km	MPC · JPL
326018	2010 WS_{62}	—	December 18, 2001	Kitt Peak	Spacewatch	·	2.8 km	MPC · JPL
326019	2010 WZ_{63}	—	September 14, 2005	Kitt Peak	Spacewatch	·	1.7 km	MPC · JPL
326020	2010 WJ_{67}	—	October 28, 2006	Mount Lemmon	Mount Lemmon Survey	·	1.3 km	MPC · JPL
326021	2010 WG_{69}	—	October 15, 2004	Mount Lemmon	Mount Lemmon Survey	·	3.7 km	MPC · JPL
326022	2010 WK_{69}	—	March 20, 2007	Catalina	CSS	·	2.2 km	MPC · JPL
326023	2010 WB_{73}	—	March 13, 2002	Kitt Peak	Spacewatch	·	1.0 km	MPC · JPL
326024	2010 WQ_{73}	—	September 28, 2006	Mount Lemmon	Mount Lemmon Survey	·	1.8 km	MPC · JPL
326025	2010 XO_{6}	—	September 29, 2005	Mount Lemmon	Mount Lemmon Survey	·	1.6 km	MPC · JPL
326026	2010 XV_{10}	—	February 27, 2008	Mount Lemmon	Mount Lemmon Survey	(5)	2.0 km	MPC · JPL
326027	2010 XV_{13}	—	September 26, 2006	Kitt Peak	Spacewatch	·	2.1 km	MPC · JPL
326028	2010 XM_{18}	—	December 24, 2005	Kitt Peak	Spacewatch	·	3.1 km	MPC · JPL
326029	2010 XM_{22}	—	October 28, 2006	Kitt Peak	Spacewatch	MAS	920 m	MPC · JPL
326030	2010 XP_{25}	—	November 12, 1999	Socorro	LINEAR	·	2.9 km	MPC · JPL
326031	2010 XR_{25}	—	October 31, 2005	Kitt Peak	Spacewatch	·	1.8 km	MPC · JPL
326032	2010 XX_{32}	—	December 13, 2006	Kitt Peak	Spacewatch	·	2.6 km	MPC · JPL
326033	2010 XX_{34}	—	January 2, 2001	Kitt Peak	Spacewatch	·	1.8 km	MPC · JPL
326034	2010 XG_{36}	—	November 5, 2005	Catalina	CSS	AGN	1.6 km	MPC · JPL
326035	2010 XJ_{37}	—	October 30, 2005	Kitt Peak	Spacewatch	·	2.1 km	MPC · JPL
326036	2010 XW_{48}	—	September 17, 2009	Mount Lemmon	Mount Lemmon Survey	·	4.3 km	MPC · JPL
326037	2010 XJ_{50}	—	February 21, 2007	Catalina	CSS	NAE	3.2 km	MPC · JPL
326038	2010 XE_{53}	—	April 29, 2000	Kitt Peak	Spacewatch	·	1.5 km	MPC · JPL
326039	2010 XM_{65}	—	July 20, 2009	Siding Spring	SSS	·	4.1 km	MPC · JPL
326040	2010 XG_{75}	—	December 4, 2005	Kitt Peak	Spacewatch	·	2.0 km	MPC · JPL
326041	2010 XO_{78}	—	October 29, 1999	Kitt Peak	Spacewatch	EOS	1.7 km	MPC · JPL
326042	2010 XU_{82}	—	February 23, 2007	Kitt Peak	Spacewatch	·	2.0 km	MPC · JPL
326043	2010 XA_{83}	—	December 20, 2006	Palomar	NEAT	MAR	1.5 km	MPC · JPL
326044	2010 XH_{83}	—	December 26, 2005	Kitt Peak	Spacewatch	·	3.2 km	MPC · JPL
326045	2010 YN	—	September 23, 2005	Kitt Peak	Spacewatch	·	1.4 km	MPC · JPL
326046	2011 AY_{5}	—	December 14, 2004	Socorro	LINEAR	·	4.1 km	MPC · JPL
326047	2011 AG_{6}	—	January 23, 2006	Kitt Peak	Spacewatch	·	2.6 km	MPC · JPL
326048	2011 AY_{7}	—	November 6, 2005	Kitt Peak	Spacewatch	·	3.4 km	MPC · JPL
326049	2011 AJ_{8}	—	February 21, 2007	Kitt Peak	Spacewatch	·	2.3 km	MPC · JPL
326050	2011 AM_{8}	—	October 20, 2009	Siding Spring	SSS	·	5.4 km	MPC · JPL
326051	2011 AV_{9}	—	May 12, 2007	Mount Lemmon	Mount Lemmon Survey	·	3.2 km	MPC · JPL
326052	2011 AZ_{9}	—	October 1, 2009	Mount Lemmon	Mount Lemmon Survey	·	3.8 km	MPC · JPL
326053	2011 AW_{10}	—	October 27, 1995	Kitt Peak	Spacewatch	CYB	4.4 km	MPC · JPL
326054	2011 AG_{11}	—	August 4, 2003	Kitt Peak	Spacewatch	THB	3.8 km	MPC · JPL
326055	2011 AO_{11}	—	January 17, 2010	WISE	WISE	CYB	4.0 km	MPC · JPL
326056	2011 AO_{16}	—	March 4, 2000	Socorro	LINEAR	·	5.7 km	MPC · JPL
326057	2011 AP_{20}	—	October 2, 2009	Mount Lemmon	Mount Lemmon Survey	·	4.6 km	MPC · JPL
326058	2011 AW_{31}	—	December 10, 2004	Kitt Peak	Spacewatch	·	4.6 km	MPC · JPL
326059	2011 AE_{32}	—	August 20, 2001	Cerro Tololo	Deep Ecliptic Survey	SYL · CYB	3.8 km	MPC · JPL
326060	2011 AH_{33}	—	February 23, 2007	Mount Lemmon	Mount Lemmon Survey	MRX	1.3 km	MPC · JPL
326061	2011 AE_{34}	—	April 25, 2007	Mount Lemmon	Mount Lemmon Survey	·	4.1 km	MPC · JPL
326062	2011 AG_{39}	—	October 1, 2009	Mount Lemmon	Mount Lemmon Survey	EOS	2.5 km	MPC · JPL
326063	2011 AN_{43}	—	February 27, 2006	Kitt Peak	Spacewatch	THM	2.5 km	MPC · JPL
326064	2011 AO_{47}	—	October 26, 2009	Kitt Peak	Spacewatch	3:2 · SHU	3.8 km	MPC · JPL
326065	2011 AH_{48}	—	April 11, 2002	Palomar	NEAT	·	2.7 km	MPC · JPL
326066	2011 AM_{48}	—	February 9, 2003	Palomar	NEAT	·	1.6 km	MPC · JPL
326067	2011 AD_{55}	—	May 3, 2008	Mount Lemmon	Mount Lemmon Survey	·	2.0 km	MPC · JPL
326068	2011 AL_{58}	—	April 25, 2007	Mount Lemmon	Mount Lemmon Survey	·	4.5 km	MPC · JPL
326069	2011 AM_{59}	—	October 23, 2009	Mount Lemmon	Mount Lemmon Survey	3:2 · SHU	6.3 km	MPC · JPL
326070	2011 AY_{60}	—	November 22, 2009	Catalina	CSS	CYB	4.5 km	MPC · JPL
326071	2011 AS_{61}	—	September 16, 2003	Palomar	NEAT	·	3.6 km	MPC · JPL
326072	2011 AS_{64}	—	January 23, 2006	Kitt Peak	Spacewatch	·	2.6 km	MPC · JPL
326073	2011 AE_{67}	—	August 23, 2003	Palomar	NEAT	·	3.0 km	MPC · JPL
326074	2011 AG_{67}	—	July 21, 2004	Siding Spring	SSS	·	2.3 km	MPC · JPL
326075	2011 AV_{72}	—	April 16, 2001	Kitt Peak	Spacewatch	·	2.7 km	MPC · JPL
326076	2011 AC_{74}	—	October 7, 2005	Anderson Mesa	LONEOS	·	2.5 km	MPC · JPL
326077	2011 AA_{75}	—	September 5, 2008	Kitt Peak	Spacewatch	T_{j} (2.99) · 3:2	6.1 km	MPC · JPL
326078	2011 AA_{77}	—	May 31, 2008	Kitt Peak	Spacewatch	·	2.2 km	MPC · JPL
326079	2011 AQ_{77}	—	November 10, 2004	Kitt Peak	Spacewatch	·	4.2 km	MPC · JPL
326080	2011 BV_{2}	—	December 2, 2005	Kitt Peak	Spacewatch	·	2.0 km	MPC · JPL
326081	2011 BD_{4}	—	November 15, 2009	Hibiscus	Teamo, N.	EOS	2.3 km	MPC · JPL
326082	2011 BC_{5}	—	September 22, 2009	Kitt Peak	Spacewatch	·	2.7 km	MPC · JPL
326083	2011 BV_{8}	—	December 1, 2005	Mount Lemmon	Mount Lemmon Survey	·	4.4 km	MPC · JPL
326084	2011 BJ_{28}	—	October 18, 2009	Kitt Peak	Spacewatch	3:2 · SHU	5.0 km	MPC · JPL
326085	2011 BC_{34}	—	March 21, 2001	Anderson Mesa	LONEOS	·	3.9 km	MPC · JPL
326086	2011 BR_{52}	—	December 13, 2004	Kitt Peak	Spacewatch	·	3.7 km	MPC · JPL
326087	2011 BM_{60}	—	December 3, 2005	Mauna Kea	A. Boattini	·	4.9 km	MPC · JPL
326088	2011 BV_{70}	—	February 24, 2006	Kitt Peak	Spacewatch	·	2.6 km	MPC · JPL
326089	2011 BO_{79}	—	May 7, 2007	Kitt Peak	Spacewatch	EOS	2.9 km	MPC · JPL
326090	2011 BR_{83}	—	September 22, 2003	Palomar	NEAT	·	4.0 km	MPC · JPL
326091	2011 BA_{85}	—	April 22, 2007	Mount Lemmon	Mount Lemmon Survey	EOS	2.8 km	MPC · JPL
326092	2011 BA_{86}	—	November 26, 2003	Kitt Peak	Spacewatch	(260) · CYB	4.8 km	MPC · JPL
326093	2011 BZ_{88}	—	February 10, 2007	Mount Lemmon	Mount Lemmon Survey	·	1.7 km	MPC · JPL
326094	2011 BO_{96}	—	July 3, 1997	Kitt Peak	Spacewatch	EOS	2.4 km	MPC · JPL
326095	2011 BM_{98}	—	October 8, 2004	Kitt Peak	Spacewatch	·	2.3 km	MPC · JPL
326096	2011 BC_{101}	—	April 12, 2002	Palomar	NEAT	·	4.0 km	MPC · JPL
326097	2011 BF_{101}	—	February 27, 2006	Kitt Peak	Spacewatch	·	3.9 km	MPC · JPL
326098	2011 BJ_{101}	—	June 3, 2008	Mount Lemmon	Mount Lemmon Survey	HOF	2.9 km	MPC · JPL
326099	2011 BR_{103}	—	March 23, 2004	Kitt Peak	Spacewatch	3:2	4.4 km	MPC · JPL
326100	2011 BQ_{115}	—	August 4, 2003	Kitt Peak	Spacewatch	·	4.2 km	MPC · JPL

== 326101–326200 ==
back to top

Designation			Discovery			Properties		Ref
Permanent	Provisional	Named after	Date	Site	Discoverer(s)	Category	Diam.	Ref
326101	2011 BN_{119}	—	October 16, 2003	Palomar	NEAT	EOS	3.0 km	MPC · JPL
326102	2011 BG_{145}	—	February 8, 2007	Mount Lemmon	Mount Lemmon Survey	·	1.5 km	MPC · JPL
326103	2011 BF_{151}	—	February 21, 2007	Kitt Peak	Spacewatch	·	1.6 km	MPC · JPL
326104	2011 CQ_{32}	—	August 12, 2007	7300	W. K. Y. Yeung	3:2	5.3 km	MPC · JPL
326105	2011 CY_{33}	—	August 8, 2004	Socorro	LINEAR	·	2.0 km	MPC · JPL
326106	2011 CG_{34}	—	November 23, 2009	Mount Lemmon	Mount Lemmon Survey	3:2	5.8 km	MPC · JPL
326107	2011 CU_{39}	—	March 24, 2006	Mount Lemmon	Mount Lemmon Survey	·	2.7 km	MPC · JPL
326108	2011 CK_{66}	—	September 24, 2009	Kitt Peak	Spacewatch	·	2.2 km	MPC · JPL
326109	2011 EM_{18}	—	February 27, 2006	Junk Bond	D. Healy	·	3.3 km	MPC · JPL
326110	2011 EH_{21}	—	October 8, 2008	Kitt Peak	Spacewatch	3:2	4.4 km	MPC · JPL
326111	2011 GG_{61}	—	May 9, 1994	Kitt Peak	Spacewatch	·	2.7 km	MPC · JPL
326112	2011 QB_{76}	—	September 7, 2000	Kitt Peak	Spacewatch	L5	10 km	MPC · JPL
326113	2011 UG_{108}	—	October 15, 2001	Palomar	NEAT	·	930 m	MPC · JPL
326114	2011 UW_{131}	—	January 28, 2004	Socorro	LINEAR	(194)	2.5 km	MPC · JPL
326115	2011 UF_{224}	—	October 10, 2002	Kitt Peak	Spacewatch	·	1.6 km	MPC · JPL
326116	2011 UU_{308}	—	December 31, 2005	Kitt Peak	Spacewatch	EOS	3.0 km	MPC · JPL
326117	2011 UW_{313}	—	October 19, 2003	Kitt Peak	Spacewatch	3:2	5.4 km	MPC · JPL
326118	2011 UR_{379}	—	December 12, 2006	Catalina	CSS	EOS	2.4 km	MPC · JPL
326119	2011 WH_{45}	—	April 23, 2004	Kitt Peak	Spacewatch	L4	10 km	MPC · JPL
326120	2011 WP_{119}	—	September 1, 2005	Palomar	NEAT	·	4.2 km	MPC · JPL
326121	2011 WU_{126}	—	September 24, 2000	Socorro	LINEAR	EOS	2.9 km	MPC · JPL
326122	2011 YA_{17}	—	January 5, 2000	Kitt Peak	Spacewatch	·	2.8 km	MPC · JPL
326123	2011 YH_{32}	—	September 18, 2009	Kitt Peak	Spacewatch	L4	9.5 km	MPC · JPL
326124	2011 YZ_{53}	—	December 1, 2003	Kitt Peak	Spacewatch	NYS	1.2 km	MPC · JPL
326125	2011 YY_{61}	—	November 8, 2009	Catalina	CSS	L4	10 km	MPC · JPL
326126	2011 YW_{63}	—	February 27, 2007	Kitt Peak	Spacewatch	·	2.3 km	MPC · JPL
326127	2011 YS_{74}	—	October 1, 2009	Mount Lemmon	Mount Lemmon Survey	L4	10 km	MPC · JPL
326128	2011 YL_{75}	—	March 14, 2007	Kitt Peak	Spacewatch	·	3.2 km	MPC · JPL
326129	2012 AM_{14}	—	December 4, 2005	Mount Lemmon	Mount Lemmon Survey	·	4.2 km	MPC · JPL
326130	2012 AU_{17}	—	September 28, 2006	Catalina	CSS	·	2.3 km	MPC · JPL
326131	2012 AM_{19}	—	March 2, 2001	Anderson Mesa	LONEOS	·	4.7 km	MPC · JPL
326132	2012 BR_{9}	—	February 2, 2005	Catalina	CSS	·	1.2 km	MPC · JPL
326133	2012 BF_{10}	—	September 13, 2005	Kitt Peak	Spacewatch	·	2.2 km	MPC · JPL
326134	2012 BZ_{20}	—	February 16, 2001	Kitt Peak	Spacewatch	NYS	1.3 km	MPC · JPL
326135	2012 BV_{23}	—	September 12, 2007	Kitt Peak	Spacewatch	L4	10 km	MPC · JPL
326136	2012 BG_{24}	—	December 4, 2005	Anderson Mesa	LONEOS	·	4.5 km	MPC · JPL
326137	2012 BN_{24}	—	December 22, 2000	Kitt Peak	Spacewatch	·	3.6 km	MPC · JPL
326138	2012 BW_{24}	—	September 13, 2004	Palomar	NEAT	·	3.8 km	MPC · JPL
326139	2012 BE_{25}	—	October 20, 2006	Mount Lemmon	Mount Lemmon Survey	DOR	3.0 km	MPC · JPL
326140	2012 BF_{28}	—	June 30, 2005	Kitt Peak	Spacewatch	·	2.0 km	MPC · JPL
326141	2012 BG_{28}	—	January 5, 2002	Kitt Peak	Spacewatch	·	750 m	MPC · JPL
326142	2012 BW_{47}	—	October 20, 2004	Catalina	CSS	·	4.6 km	MPC · JPL
326143	2012 BK_{53}	—	December 24, 2005	Kitt Peak	Spacewatch	THM	2.1 km	MPC · JPL
326144	2012 BO_{53}	—	September 6, 1996	Kitt Peak	Spacewatch	BAP	1.1 km	MPC · JPL
326145	2012 BP_{53}	—	August 8, 1999	Kitt Peak	Spacewatch	·	1.3 km	MPC · JPL
326146	2012 BS_{53}	—	October 10, 2002	Apache Point	SDSS	NYS	1.4 km	MPC · JPL
326147	2012 BA_{54}	—	April 6, 1995	Kitt Peak	Spacewatch	·	720 m	MPC · JPL
326148	2012 BR_{54}	—	January 11, 2003	Kitt Peak	Spacewatch	·	4.3 km	MPC · JPL
326149	2012 BU_{55}	—	February 20, 2001	Kitt Peak	Spacewatch	·	4.0 km	MPC · JPL
326150	2012 BX_{55}	—	January 18, 2008	Mount Lemmon	Mount Lemmon Survey	·	2.0 km	MPC · JPL
326151	2012 BY_{56}	—	July 18, 2006	Mount Lemmon	Mount Lemmon Survey	·	1.5 km	MPC · JPL
326152	2012 BM_{58}	—	January 17, 1994	Kitt Peak	Spacewatch	·	2.0 km	MPC · JPL
326153	2012 BE_{67}	—	January 29, 2010	WISE	WISE	L4	10 km	MPC · JPL
326154	2012 BK_{69}	—	November 8, 2007	Kitt Peak	Spacewatch	MAS	620 m	MPC · JPL
326155	2012 BK_{72}	—	July 28, 2005	Palomar	NEAT	·	2.1 km	MPC · JPL
326156	2012 BK_{75}	—	December 24, 2005	Kitt Peak	Spacewatch	·	4.2 km	MPC · JPL
326157	2012 BE_{76}	—	March 10, 2002	Kitt Peak	Spacewatch	·	2.1 km	MPC · JPL
326158	2012 BN_{78}	—	October 2, 1999	Kitt Peak	Spacewatch	·	1.4 km	MPC · JPL
326159	2012 BK_{87}	—	February 19, 2001	Socorro	LINEAR	·	4.3 km	MPC · JPL
326160	2012 BB_{88}	—	July 5, 2003	Kitt Peak	Spacewatch	EOS	2.4 km	MPC · JPL
326161	2012 BE_{88}	—	March 11, 2007	Kitt Peak	Spacewatch	·	3.4 km	MPC · JPL
326162	2012 BJ_{91}	—	January 26, 2003	Anderson Mesa	LONEOS	·	2.2 km	MPC · JPL
326163	2012 BR_{91}	—	December 25, 2005	Kitt Peak	Spacewatch	·	2.8 km	MPC · JPL
326164 Miketoomey	2012 BJ_{94}	Miketoomey	May 24, 2001	Cerro Tololo	Deep Ecliptic Survey	·	1.8 km	MPC · JPL
326165	2012 BH_{99}	—	July 8, 2003	Palomar	NEAT	V	800 m	MPC · JPL
326166	2012 BC_{101}	—	November 19, 2003	Catalina	CSS	V	810 m	MPC · JPL
326167	2012 BD_{102}	—	February 5, 2002	Palomar	NEAT	EOS	2.2 km	MPC · JPL
326168	2012 BK_{111}	—	February 9, 1999	Kitt Peak	Spacewatch	·	2.2 km	MPC · JPL
326169	2012 BT_{111}	—	January 9, 2002	Socorro	LINEAR	·	2.4 km	MPC · JPL
326170	2012 BV_{111}	—	March 9, 2005	Socorro	LINEAR	·	1.6 km	MPC · JPL
326171	2012 BS_{112}	—	September 15, 2004	Kitt Peak	Spacewatch	·	3.3 km	MPC · JPL
326172	2012 BV_{112}	—	March 5, 2008	Mount Lemmon	Mount Lemmon Survey	·	1.3 km	MPC · JPL
326173	2012 BC_{115}	—	February 14, 2001	Kleť	M. Tichý	·	3.7 km	MPC · JPL
326174	2012 BL_{117}	—	April 11, 2008	Kitt Peak	Spacewatch	AGN	1.3 km	MPC · JPL
326175	2012 BL_{119}	—	December 1, 2005	Kitt Peak	Spacewatch	THM	2.4 km	MPC · JPL
326176	2012 BX_{121}	—	November 25, 2006	Kitt Peak	Spacewatch	·	5.7 km	MPC · JPL
326177	2012 BF_{125}	—	November 19, 2003	Palomar	NEAT	·	1.6 km	MPC · JPL
326178	2012 BK_{126}	—	March 16, 2001	Kitt Peak	Spacewatch	·	1.4 km	MPC · JPL
326179	2012 BR_{127}	—	December 12, 1999	Kitt Peak	Spacewatch	THM	2.7 km	MPC · JPL
326180	2012 BY_{131}	—	November 30, 2003	Socorro	LINEAR	·	1.8 km	MPC · JPL
326181	2012 BE_{132}	—	August 29, 2009	Kitt Peak	Spacewatch	·	3.6 km	MPC · JPL
326182	2012 BF_{132}	—	March 18, 2005	Catalina	CSS	V	870 m	MPC · JPL
326183	2012 BB_{134}	—	August 30, 2005	Kitt Peak	Spacewatch	·	1.9 km	MPC · JPL
326184	2012 BU_{134}	—	November 16, 2003	Kitt Peak	Spacewatch	·	1.3 km	MPC · JPL
326185	2012 BN_{139}	—	November 24, 2003	Kitt Peak	Spacewatch	·	1.3 km	MPC · JPL
326186	2012 CO	—	February 24, 1998	Kitt Peak	Spacewatch	·	770 m	MPC · JPL
326187	2012 CO_{1}	—	October 1, 2005	Kitt Peak	Spacewatch	KOR	1.2 km	MPC · JPL
326188	2012 CV_{1}	—	November 1, 2006	Mount Lemmon	Mount Lemmon Survey	·	1.5 km	MPC · JPL
326189	2012 CB_{3}	—	September 19, 2003	Kitt Peak	Spacewatch	HYG	2.9 km	MPC · JPL
326190	2012 CE_{5}	—	November 6, 1999	Kitt Peak	Spacewatch	MAS	1.0 km	MPC · JPL
326191	2012 CK_{7}	—	October 12, 2004	Kitt Peak	Spacewatch	THM	2.6 km	MPC · JPL
326192	2012 CH_{8}	—	February 8, 1995	Kitt Peak	Spacewatch	·	2.9 km	MPC · JPL
326193	2012 CN_{8}	—	January 27, 2003	Socorro	LINEAR	·	2.4 km	MPC · JPL
326194	2012 CB_{9}	—	January 10, 2006	Mount Lemmon	Mount Lemmon Survey	·	4.0 km	MPC · JPL
326195	2012 CA_{12}	—	September 17, 2006	Kitt Peak	Spacewatch	V	650 m	MPC · JPL
326196	2012 CD_{13}	—	March 19, 2001	Kitt Peak	Spacewatch	NYS	1.4 km	MPC · JPL
326197	2012 CX_{13}	—	March 29, 2004	Kitt Peak	Spacewatch	·	1.2 km	MPC · JPL
326198	2012 CN_{14}	—	July 14, 2002	Palomar	NEAT	V	730 m	MPC · JPL
326199	2012 CH_{15}	—	December 25, 2005	Mount Lemmon	Mount Lemmon Survey	THM	2.5 km	MPC · JPL
326200	2012 CR_{15}	—	April 25, 2008	Kitt Peak	Spacewatch	·	2.0 km	MPC · JPL

== 326201–326300 ==
back to top

Designation			Discovery			Properties		Ref
Permanent	Provisional	Named after	Date	Site	Discoverer(s)	Category	Diam.	Ref
326201	2012 CS_{17}	—	February 29, 2004	Kitt Peak	Spacewatch	·	1.2 km	MPC · JPL
326202	2012 CW_{18}	—	February 7, 2003	Anderson Mesa	LONEOS	·	2.6 km	MPC · JPL
326203	2012 CW_{20}	—	March 8, 2005	Kitt Peak	Spacewatch	V	790 m	MPC · JPL
326204	2012 CG_{21}	—	February 9, 2005	Anderson Mesa	LONEOS	V	780 m	MPC · JPL
326205	2012 CK_{21}	—	December 4, 2007	Mount Lemmon	Mount Lemmon Survey	MAS	670 m	MPC · JPL
326206	2012 CN_{21}	—	December 21, 2005	Kitt Peak	Spacewatch	·	4.0 km	MPC · JPL
326207	2012 CH_{25}	—	December 5, 2005	Kitt Peak	Spacewatch	·	3.2 km	MPC · JPL
326208	2012 CP_{28}	—	August 25, 2004	Kitt Peak	Spacewatch	EOS	1.8 km	MPC · JPL
326209	2012 CL_{35}	—	October 13, 1999	Kitt Peak	Spacewatch	·	1.3 km	MPC · JPL
326210	2012 CG_{37}	—	March 10, 2007	Mount Lemmon	Mount Lemmon Survey	·	2.7 km	MPC · JPL
326211	2012 CP_{38}	—	February 1, 2006	Mount Lemmon	Mount Lemmon Survey	·	3.0 km	MPC · JPL
326212	2012 CC_{39}	—	February 2, 2000	Kitt Peak	Spacewatch	L4	9.9 km	MPC · JPL
326213	2012 CJ_{39}	—	March 9, 2005	Mount Lemmon	Mount Lemmon Survey	·	720 m	MPC · JPL
326214	2012 CM_{39}	—	January 26, 1998	Kitt Peak	Spacewatch	HOF	2.9 km	MPC · JPL
326215	2012 CA_{41}	—	August 25, 2000	Cerro Tololo	Deep Ecliptic Survey	AGN	1.1 km	MPC · JPL
326216	2012 CC_{42}	—	February 10, 2002	Socorro	LINEAR	·	1.9 km	MPC · JPL
326217	2012 CK_{42}	—	November 29, 2005	Kitt Peak	Spacewatch	·	2.7 km	MPC · JPL
326218	2012 CX_{43}	—	April 18, 1998	Kitt Peak	Spacewatch	·	1.0 km	MPC · JPL
326219	2012 CM_{44}	—	March 10, 2003	Kitt Peak	Spacewatch	·	1.9 km	MPC · JPL
326220	2012 CM_{47}	—	April 14, 2002	Palomar	NEAT	·	780 m	MPC · JPL
326221	2012 CD_{50}	—	September 15, 2006	Kitt Peak	Spacewatch	NYS	1.7 km	MPC · JPL
326222	2012 CQ_{50}	—	April 14, 2007	Kitt Peak	Spacewatch	·	2.9 km	MPC · JPL
326223	2012 DH_{1}	—	June 25, 2000	Kitt Peak	Spacewatch	·	2.3 km	MPC · JPL
326224	2012 DL_{5}	—	October 25, 2005	Kitt Peak	Spacewatch	·	1.8 km	MPC · JPL
326225	2012 DW_{5}	—	April 26, 2006	Kitt Peak	Spacewatch	·	650 m	MPC · JPL
326226	2012 DR_{6}	—	March 1, 2005	Kitt Peak	Spacewatch	V	820 m	MPC · JPL
326227	2012 DZ_{6}	—	September 23, 2005	Kitt Peak	Spacewatch	·	2.0 km	MPC · JPL
326228	2012 DQ_{7}	—	October 3, 2006	Mount Lemmon	Mount Lemmon Survey	·	1.4 km	MPC · JPL
326229	2012 DY_{7}	—	August 24, 2003	Palomar	NEAT	·	2.6 km	MPC · JPL
326230	2012 DE_{8}	—	December 30, 2005	Kitt Peak	Spacewatch	·	3.0 km	MPC · JPL
326231	2012 DS_{8}	—	November 18, 1998	Kitt Peak	Spacewatch	·	1.4 km	MPC · JPL
326232	2012 DS_{9}	—	September 7, 1999	Kitt Peak	Spacewatch	·	1.0 km	MPC · JPL
326233	2012 DD_{17}	—	February 7, 2002	Socorro	LINEAR	·	2.4 km	MPC · JPL
326234	2012 DK_{17}	—	April 2, 2006	Mount Lemmon	Mount Lemmon Survey	·	3.4 km	MPC · JPL
326235	2012 DO_{18}	—	August 26, 2003	Cerro Tololo	Deep Ecliptic Survey	·	4.3 km	MPC · JPL
326236	2012 DC_{20}	—	January 9, 2005	Catalina	CSS	·	2.6 km	MPC · JPL
326237	2012 DG_{20}	—	September 19, 1998	Apache Point	SDSS	·	4.0 km	MPC · JPL
326238	2012 DN_{20}	—	March 9, 2005	Kitt Peak	Spacewatch	·	1.1 km	MPC · JPL
326239	2012 DT_{20}	—	December 30, 2005	Kitt Peak	Spacewatch	·	3.4 km	MPC · JPL
326240	2012 DB_{21}	—	February 6, 2007	Palomar	NEAT	DOR	2.8 km	MPC · JPL
326241	2012 DG_{21}	—	March 27, 1995	Kitt Peak	Spacewatch	·	2.0 km	MPC · JPL
326242	2012 DS_{21}	—	April 26, 2000	Kitt Peak	Spacewatch	fast?	1.3 km	MPC · JPL
326243	2012 DT_{21}	—	December 3, 1996	Kitt Peak	Spacewatch	·	2.7 km	MPC · JPL
326244	2012 DN_{24}	—	February 1, 2006	Mount Lemmon	Mount Lemmon Survey	·	3.1 km	MPC · JPL
326245	2012 DG_{25}	—	March 30, 2008	Kitt Peak	Spacewatch	(5)	1.9 km	MPC · JPL
326246	2012 DL_{25}	—	October 1, 2005	Kitt Peak	Spacewatch	AEO	1.4 km	MPC · JPL
326247	2012 DS_{25}	—	September 21, 2003	Kitt Peak	Spacewatch	·	970 m	MPC · JPL
326248	2012 DB_{26}	—	April 10, 2002	Socorro	LINEAR	EOS	2.7 km	MPC · JPL
326249	2012 DM_{26}	—	June 11, 2005	Kitt Peak	Spacewatch	·	1.1 km	MPC · JPL
326250	2012 DC_{27}	—	January 19, 2001	Kitt Peak	Spacewatch	·	1.1 km	MPC · JPL
326251	2012 DU_{36}	—	March 24, 2003	Kitt Peak	Spacewatch	·	2.2 km	MPC · JPL
326252	2012 DC_{41}	—	October 27, 2005	Kitt Peak	Spacewatch	KOR	1.4 km	MPC · JPL
326253	2012 DF_{42}	—	January 31, 2006	Mount Lemmon	Mount Lemmon Survey	·	3.1 km	MPC · JPL
326254	2012 DD_{43}	—	May 20, 2005	Mount Lemmon	Mount Lemmon Survey	·	1.2 km	MPC · JPL
326255	2012 DN_{48}	—	September 26, 2006	Kitt Peak	Spacewatch	·	1.4 km	MPC · JPL
326256	2012 DK_{53}	—	August 8, 2004	Socorro	LINEAR	HOF	3.3 km	MPC · JPL
326257	2012 DK_{56}	—	March 7, 2003	Socorro	LINEAR	·	2.5 km	MPC · JPL
326258	2012 DV_{59}	—	January 26, 2006	Catalina	CSS	VER	4.0 km	MPC · JPL
326259	2012 DO_{66}	—	November 24, 2006	Kitt Peak	Spacewatch	·	1.6 km	MPC · JPL
326260	2012 DE_{67}	—	October 31, 2005	Mount Lemmon	Mount Lemmon Survey	KOR	1.5 km	MPC · JPL
326261	2012 DZ_{75}	—	May 25, 2006	Mount Lemmon	Mount Lemmon Survey	·	4.8 km	MPC · JPL
326262	2012 EP_{1}	—	November 9, 1999	Kitt Peak	Spacewatch	THM	2.0 km	MPC · JPL
326263	2741 P-L	—	September 24, 1960	Palomar	C. J. van Houten, I. van Houten-Groeneveld, T. Gehrels	·	3.7 km	MPC · JPL
326264	3488 T-3	—	October 16, 1977	Palomar	C. J. van Houten, I. van Houten-Groeneveld, T. Gehrels	MAS	750 m	MPC · JPL
326265	3494 T-3	—	October 16, 1977	Palomar	C. J. van Houten, I. van Houten-Groeneveld, T. Gehrels	·	1.1 km	MPC · JPL
326266	5087 T-3	—	October 16, 1977	Palomar	C. J. van Houten, I. van Houten-Groeneveld, T. Gehrels	·	2.5 km	MPC · JPL
326267	1993 BG_{8}	—	January 21, 1993	Kitt Peak	Spacewatch	·	4.8 km	MPC · JPL
326268	1993 TT_{2}	—	October 15, 1993	Kitt Peak	Spacewatch	·	660 m	MPC · JPL
326269	1994 LL_{4}	—	June 3, 1994	La Silla	H. Debehogne	·	1.3 km	MPC · JPL
326270	1994 SO_{7}	—	September 28, 1994	Kitt Peak	Spacewatch	·	990 m	MPC · JPL
326271	1995 BK_{14}	—	January 31, 1995	Kitt Peak	Spacewatch	·	3.1 km	MPC · JPL
326272	1995 BG_{15}	—	January 31, 1995	Kitt Peak	Spacewatch	·	1.4 km	MPC · JPL
326273	1995 DP_{7}	—	February 24, 1995	Kitt Peak	Spacewatch	·	3.2 km	MPC · JPL
326274	1995 QM_{14}	—	August 27, 1995	Kitt Peak	Spacewatch	V	580 m	MPC · JPL
326275	1995 SR_{34}	—	September 22, 1995	Kitt Peak	Spacewatch	·	1.2 km	MPC · JPL
326276	1995 SE_{43}	—	September 25, 1995	Kitt Peak	Spacewatch	·	1.1 km	MPC · JPL
326277	1995 WS_{28}	—	November 19, 1995	Kitt Peak	Spacewatch	HOF	2.8 km	MPC · JPL
326278	1996 GA_{16}	—	April 13, 1996	Kitt Peak	Spacewatch	·	670 m	MPC · JPL
326279	1996 RE_{7}	—	September 5, 1996	Kitt Peak	Spacewatch	EUN	1.4 km	MPC · JPL
326280	1996 TU_{27}	—	October 7, 1996	Kitt Peak	Spacewatch	MRX	1.2 km	MPC · JPL
326281	1996 VT_{11}	—	November 4, 1996	Kitt Peak	Spacewatch	·	830 m	MPC · JPL
326282	1996 VN_{25}	—	November 10, 1996	Kitt Peak	Spacewatch	·	2.2 km	MPC · JPL
326283	1996 VZ_{25}	—	November 10, 1996	Kitt Peak	Spacewatch	·	840 m	MPC · JPL
326284	1996 XX_{3}	—	December 4, 1996	Kitt Peak	Spacewatch	·	860 m	MPC · JPL
326285	1996 XZ_{7}	—	December 1, 1996	Kitt Peak	Spacewatch	V	800 m	MPC · JPL
326286	1997 SO_{30}	—	September 30, 1997	Kitt Peak	Spacewatch	·	1.3 km	MPC · JPL
326287	1997 UB_{6}	—	October 23, 1997	Kitt Peak	Spacewatch	·	1.5 km	MPC · JPL
326288	1997 UQ_{9}	—	October 30, 1997	Prescott	P. G. Comba	·	4.7 km	MPC · JPL
326289	1997 WY_{6}	—	November 23, 1997	Kitt Peak	Spacewatch	·	3.3 km	MPC · JPL
326290 Akhenaten	1998 HE_{3}	Akhenaten	April 21, 1998	Goodricke-Pigott	R. A. Tucker	ATE · PHA	150 m	MPC · JPL
326291	1998 HM_{3}	—	April 21, 1998	Socorro	LINEAR	AMO	560 m	MPC · JPL
326292	1998 HR_{3}	—	April 19, 1998	Kitt Peak	Spacewatch	·	2.9 km	MPC · JPL
326293	1998 MH_{6}	—	June 19, 1998	Kitt Peak	Spacewatch	·	1.4 km	MPC · JPL
326294	1998 RE_{31}	—	September 14, 1998	Socorro	LINEAR	·	1.6 km	MPC · JPL
326295	1998 RU_{31}	—	September 14, 1998	Socorro	LINEAR	·	3.0 km	MPC · JPL
326296	1998 SC_{44}	—	September 21, 1998	Kitt Peak	Spacewatch	NYS	1.5 km	MPC · JPL
326297	1998 SQ_{51}	—	September 27, 1998	Kitt Peak	Spacewatch	NYS	1.3 km	MPC · JPL
326298	1998 SW_{56}	—	September 17, 1998	Anderson Mesa	LONEOS	·	1.7 km	MPC · JPL
326299	1998 SN_{172}	—	September 19, 1998	Apache Point	SDSS	·	2.5 km	MPC · JPL
326300	1998 TL_{14}	—	October 14, 1998	Kitt Peak	Spacewatch	·	2.4 km	MPC · JPL

== 326301–326400 ==
back to top

Designation			Discovery			Properties		Ref
Permanent	Provisional	Named after	Date	Site	Discoverer(s)	Category	Diam.	Ref
326301	1998 TS_{26}	—	October 14, 1998	Kitt Peak	Spacewatch	·	1.9 km	MPC · JPL
326302	1998 VN	—	November 10, 1998	Socorro	LINEAR	APO	270 m	MPC · JPL
326303	1998 VY_{31}	—	November 14, 1998	Socorro	LINEAR	·	2.1 km	MPC · JPL
326304	1998 WO_{26}	—	November 16, 1998	Kitt Peak	Spacewatch	·	2.3 km	MPC · JPL
326305	1998 WK_{40}	—	November 23, 1998	Kitt Peak	Spacewatch	NYS	1.6 km	MPC · JPL
326306	1998 XY_{4}	—	December 12, 1998	Socorro	LINEAR	·	1.6 km	MPC · JPL
326307	1998 XE_{10}	—	December 8, 1998	Caussols	ODAS	·	2.1 km	MPC · JPL
326308	1999 FS_{73}	—	March 20, 1999	Apache Point	SDSS	·	1.7 km	MPC · JPL
326309	1999 RF_{2}	—	September 4, 1999	Kitt Peak	Spacewatch	·	820 m	MPC · JPL
326310	1999 RO_{153}	—	September 9, 1999	Socorro	LINEAR	·	780 m	MPC · JPL
326311	1999 RL_{162}	—	September 9, 1999	Socorro	LINEAR	·	2.8 km	MPC · JPL
326312	1999 TG_{69}	—	October 9, 1999	Kitt Peak	Spacewatch	V	810 m	MPC · JPL
326313	1999 TJ_{140}	—	October 6, 1999	Socorro	LINEAR	DOR	3.2 km	MPC · JPL
326314	1999 TJ_{204}	—	October 13, 1999	Socorro	LINEAR	·	1.4 km	MPC · JPL
326315	1999 UE_{22}	—	October 31, 1999	Kitt Peak	Spacewatch	·	870 m	MPC · JPL
326316	1999 UH_{29}	—	October 31, 1999	Kitt Peak	Spacewatch	·	3.7 km	MPC · JPL
326317	1999 VN_{23}	—	November 13, 1999	Eskridge	G. Hug, G. Bell	·	2.8 km	MPC · JPL
326318	1999 VK_{85}	—	November 5, 1999	Catalina	CSS	·	3.0 km	MPC · JPL
326319	1999 VV_{124}	—	November 10, 1999	Kitt Peak	Spacewatch	·	1.0 km	MPC · JPL
326320	1999 VK_{131}	—	November 9, 1999	Kitt Peak	Spacewatch	·	1.9 km	MPC · JPL
326321	1999 VT_{180}	—	November 7, 1999	Socorro	LINEAR	·	1.3 km	MPC · JPL
326322	1999 VW_{205}	—	November 12, 1999	Socorro	LINEAR	·	1.3 km	MPC · JPL
326323	1999 VY_{210}	—	November 13, 1999	Catalina	CSS	·	2.9 km	MPC · JPL
326324	1999 XP_{69}	—	December 7, 1999	Socorro	LINEAR	·	1.0 km	MPC · JPL
326325	1999 XL_{217}	—	December 13, 1999	Kitt Peak	Spacewatch	·	3.2 km	MPC · JPL
326326	1999 XN_{223}	—	December 13, 1999	Kitt Peak	Spacewatch	·	3.3 km	MPC · JPL
326327	1999 YR_{8}	—	December 27, 1999	Kitt Peak	Spacewatch	EOS	2.5 km	MPC · JPL
326328	2000 BO_{9}	—	January 26, 2000	Kitt Peak	Spacewatch	·	3.6 km	MPC · JPL
326329	2000 EY_{15}	—	March 3, 2000	Kitt Peak	Spacewatch	·	3.8 km	MPC · JPL
326330	2000 ES_{72}	—	March 10, 2000	Kitt Peak	Spacewatch	NYS	1.4 km	MPC · JPL
326331	2000 EA_{99}	—	March 10, 2000	Kitt Peak	Spacewatch	·	1.8 km	MPC · JPL
326332	2000 GS_{146}	—	April 6, 2000	Socorro	LINEAR	AMO +1km	810 m	MPC · JPL
326333	2000 KX_{4}	—	May 27, 2000	Socorro	LINEAR	·	1.8 km	MPC · JPL
326334	2000 QK_{7}	—	August 25, 2000	Socorro	LINEAR	·	1.5 km	MPC · JPL
326335	2000 QF_{63}	—	August 28, 2000	Socorro	LINEAR	EUN	1.5 km	MPC · JPL
326336	2000 QU_{93}	—	August 26, 2000	Socorro	LINEAR	ADE	3.0 km	MPC · JPL
326337	2000 QC_{145}	—	August 31, 2000	Socorro	LINEAR	(194)	2.6 km	MPC · JPL
326338	2000 QM_{197}	—	August 29, 2000	Socorro	LINEAR	RAF	1.4 km	MPC · JPL
326339	2000 RZ_{56}	—	September 7, 2000	Kitt Peak	Spacewatch	·	2.0 km	MPC · JPL
326340	2000 RC_{79}	—	September 9, 2000	Anderson Mesa	LONEOS	BAR	1.5 km	MPC · JPL
326341	2000 RD_{98}	—	September 5, 2000	Anderson Mesa	LONEOS	JUN	1.3 km	MPC · JPL
326342	2000 RT_{106}	—	September 3, 2000	Apache Point	SDSS	·	1.5 km	MPC · JPL
326343	2000 SF_{13}	—	September 21, 2000	Socorro	LINEAR	·	1.7 km	MPC · JPL
326344	2000 SR_{26}	—	September 23, 2000	Socorro	LINEAR	·	2.7 km	MPC · JPL
326345	2000 SM_{34}	—	September 24, 2000	Socorro	LINEAR	EUN	1.5 km	MPC · JPL
326346	2000 SZ_{55}	—	September 24, 2000	Socorro	LINEAR	·	2.3 km	MPC · JPL
326347	2000 SU_{81}	—	September 24, 2000	Socorro	LINEAR	·	2.8 km	MPC · JPL
326348	2000 SB_{136}	—	September 23, 2000	Socorro	LINEAR	·	1.3 km	MPC · JPL
326349	2000 SP_{202}	—	September 24, 2000	Socorro	LINEAR	EUN	1.4 km	MPC · JPL
326350	2000 SS_{217}	—	September 26, 2000	Socorro	LINEAR	·	1.1 km	MPC · JPL
326351	2000 SX_{245}	—	September 24, 2000	Socorro	LINEAR	·	960 m	MPC · JPL
326352	2000 SD_{263}	—	September 25, 2000	Socorro	LINEAR	·	2.8 km	MPC · JPL
326353	2000 SC_{268}	—	September 27, 2000	Socorro	LINEAR	·	2.4 km	MPC · JPL
326354	2000 SJ_{344}	—	September 30, 2000	Mauna Kea	D. J. Tholen, Whiteley, R. J.	APO	100 m	MPC · JPL
326355	2000 SA_{347}	—	September 26, 2000	Haleakala	NEAT	·	1.8 km	MPC · JPL
326356	2000 SP_{361}	—	September 23, 2000	Anderson Mesa	LONEOS	·	2.2 km	MPC · JPL
326357	2000 SH_{367}	—	September 22, 2000	Socorro	LINEAR	EUN	1.6 km	MPC · JPL
326358	2000 TV_{35}	—	October 6, 2000	Anderson Mesa	LONEOS	·	2.6 km	MPC · JPL
326359	2000 TD_{41}	—	October 1, 2000	Anderson Mesa	LONEOS	GEF	1.5 km	MPC · JPL
326360	2000 TE_{51}	—	October 1, 2000	Socorro	LINEAR	JUN	1.3 km	MPC · JPL
326361	2000 UX_{5}	—	October 25, 2000	Kitt Peak	Spacewatch	·	830 m	MPC · JPL
326362	2000 UD_{19}	—	October 29, 2000	Socorro	LINEAR	·	3.9 km	MPC · JPL
326363	2000 UW_{81}	—	October 25, 2000	Socorro	LINEAR	EUN	1.5 km	MPC · JPL
326364	2000 VC_{2}	—	November 1, 2000	Socorro	LINEAR	·	1.4 km	MPC · JPL
326365	2000 VR_{19}	—	November 1, 2000	Socorro	LINEAR	·	2.8 km	MPC · JPL
326366	2000 WV_{21}	—	November 20, 2000	Socorro	LINEAR	slow	2.5 km	MPC · JPL
326367	2000 WU_{30}	—	November 20, 2000	Socorro	LINEAR	·	3.1 km	MPC · JPL
326368	2000 WE_{63}	—	November 27, 2000	Haleakala	NEAT	·	3.2 km	MPC · JPL
326369	2000 WO_{74}	—	November 20, 2000	Socorro	LINEAR	·	790 m	MPC · JPL
326370	2000 WW_{74}	—	November 20, 2000	Socorro	LINEAR	·	1.0 km	MPC · JPL
326371	2000 WN_{120}	—	November 20, 2000	Socorro	LINEAR	·	2.2 km	MPC · JPL
326372	2000 WF_{184}	—	November 30, 2000	Anderson Mesa	LONEOS	·	870 m	MPC · JPL
326373	2000 XT_{14}	—	December 4, 2000	Socorro	LINEAR	PHO	1.4 km	MPC · JPL
326374	2000 XO_{15}	—	December 4, 2000	Prescott	P. G. Comba	GEF	1.8 km	MPC · JPL
326375	2001 BP_{53}	—	January 17, 2001	Haleakala	NEAT	·	1.3 km	MPC · JPL
326376	2001 CE_{7}	—	February 1, 2001	Socorro	LINEAR	·	1.4 km	MPC · JPL
326377	2001 DX_{22}	—	February 17, 2001	Socorro	LINEAR	·	2.2 km	MPC · JPL
326378	2001 DK_{79}	—	February 19, 2001	Haleakala	NEAT	EOS	3.1 km	MPC · JPL
326379	2001 FM_{58}	—	March 24, 2001	Haleakala	NEAT	·	3.7 km	MPC · JPL
326380	2001 FG_{74}	—	March 19, 2001	Socorro	LINEAR	·	3.6 km	MPC · JPL
326381	2001 FS_{175}	—	March 16, 2001	Socorro	LINEAR	PHO	1.1 km	MPC · JPL
326382	2001 HQ_{19}	—	April 24, 2001	Kitt Peak	Spacewatch	·	3.4 km	MPC · JPL
326383	2001 HG_{32}	—	April 27, 2001	Socorro	LINEAR	H	710 m	MPC · JPL
326384	2001 HQ_{67}	—	April 17, 2001	Anderson Mesa	LONEOS	·	1.3 km	MPC · JPL
326385	2001 KO_{51}	—	May 25, 2001	Socorro	LINEAR	·	1.6 km	MPC · JPL
326386	2001 OA_{14}	—	July 20, 2001	Socorro	LINEAR	APO	680 m	MPC · JPL
326387	2001 OL_{68}	—	July 16, 2001	Anderson Mesa	LONEOS	EUN	1.8 km	MPC · JPL
326388	2001 QD_{96}	—	August 19, 2001	Socorro	LINEAR	APO +1km	1.1 km	MPC · JPL
326389	2001 QC_{117}	—	August 17, 2001	Socorro	LINEAR	(194)	2.1 km	MPC · JPL
326390	2001 QZ_{133}	—	August 21, 2001	Socorro	LINEAR	·	1.7 km	MPC · JPL
326391	2001 QE_{203}	—	August 23, 2001	Anderson Mesa	LONEOS	(5)	1.9 km	MPC · JPL
326392	2001 QW_{204}	—	August 23, 2001	Anderson Mesa	LONEOS	·	1.6 km	MPC · JPL
326393	2001 QX_{265}	—	August 20, 2001	Palomar	NEAT	·	2.1 km	MPC · JPL
326394	2001 QS_{327}	—	August 17, 2001	Palomar	NEAT	·	1.4 km	MPC · JPL
326395	2001 RM_{24}	—	September 7, 2001	Socorro	LINEAR	·	1.8 km	MPC · JPL
326396	2001 RZ_{37}	—	September 8, 2001	Socorro	LINEAR	slow	3.3 km	MPC · JPL
326397	2001 RO_{91}	—	September 11, 2001	Anderson Mesa	LONEOS	·	2.2 km	MPC · JPL
326398	2001 RH_{97}	—	September 12, 2001	Kitt Peak	Spacewatch	(5)	1.6 km	MPC · JPL
326399	2001 RJ_{115}	—	September 12, 2001	Socorro	LINEAR	·	1.4 km	MPC · JPL
326400	2001 SH_{67}	—	September 17, 2001	Socorro	LINEAR	·	1.6 km	MPC · JPL

== 326401–326500 ==
back to top

Designation			Discovery			Properties		Ref
Permanent	Provisional	Named after	Date	Site	Discoverer(s)	Category	Diam.	Ref
326401	2001 SP_{100}	—	September 20, 2001	Socorro	LINEAR	·	1.2 km	MPC · JPL
326402	2001 SB_{119}	—	September 16, 2001	Socorro	LINEAR	·	2.7 km	MPC · JPL
326403	2001 SQ_{128}	—	September 16, 2001	Socorro	LINEAR	·	1.2 km	MPC · JPL
326404	2001 SW_{136}	—	September 16, 2001	Socorro	LINEAR	·	1.3 km	MPC · JPL
326405	2001 SL_{137}	—	September 16, 2001	Socorro	LINEAR	·	1.4 km	MPC · JPL
326406	2001 SK_{146}	—	September 16, 2001	Socorro	LINEAR	·	2.0 km	MPC · JPL
326407	2001 SO_{171}	—	September 16, 2001	Socorro	LINEAR	·	1.6 km	MPC · JPL
326408	2001 SQ_{177}	—	September 16, 2001	Socorro	LINEAR	·	1.9 km	MPC · JPL
326409	2001 SG_{205}	—	September 19, 2001	Socorro	LINEAR	CYB	3.9 km	MPC · JPL
326410	2001 SM_{211}	—	September 19, 2001	Socorro	LINEAR	EUN	1.2 km	MPC · JPL
326411	2001 SV_{219}	—	September 19, 2001	Socorro	LINEAR	·	1.5 km	MPC · JPL
326412	2001 SW_{229}	—	September 19, 2001	Socorro	LINEAR	·	1.5 km	MPC · JPL
326413	2001 SU_{323}	—	September 25, 2001	Socorro	LINEAR	·	1.7 km	MPC · JPL
326414	2001 SB_{326}	—	September 17, 2001	Socorro	LINEAR	·	2.2 km	MPC · JPL
326415	2001 SK_{326}	—	September 18, 2001	Anderson Mesa	LONEOS	·	1.8 km	MPC · JPL
326416	2001 SV_{342}	—	September 21, 2001	Kitt Peak	Spacewatch	·	1.7 km	MPC · JPL
326417	2001 TN_{12}	—	October 13, 2001	Socorro	LINEAR	EUN	1.7 km	MPC · JPL
326418	2001 TH_{27}	—	October 14, 2001	Socorro	LINEAR	·	1.5 km	MPC · JPL
326419	2001 TO_{30}	—	October 14, 2001	Socorro	LINEAR	·	2.2 km	MPC · JPL
326420	2001 TS_{54}	—	October 14, 2001	Socorro	LINEAR	·	2.0 km	MPC · JPL
326421	2001 TU_{76}	—	October 13, 2001	Socorro	LINEAR	·	1.8 km	MPC · JPL
326422	2001 TN_{99}	—	October 14, 2001	Socorro	LINEAR	·	1.2 km	MPC · JPL
326423	2001 TT_{111}	—	October 14, 2001	Socorro	LINEAR	·	2.6 km	MPC · JPL
326424	2001 TA_{130}	—	October 15, 2001	Kitt Peak	Spacewatch	·	1.4 km	MPC · JPL
326425	2001 TJ_{155}	—	October 13, 2001	Kitt Peak	Spacewatch	·	1.2 km	MPC · JPL
326426	2001 TO_{156}	—	October 14, 2001	Kitt Peak	Spacewatch	·	1.4 km	MPC · JPL
326427	2001 TT_{158}	—	October 11, 2001	Palomar	NEAT	EUN	1.3 km	MPC · JPL
326428	2001 TW_{165}	—	October 14, 2001	Socorro	LINEAR	·	1.8 km	MPC · JPL
326429	2001 TF_{207}	—	October 11, 2001	Palomar	NEAT	·	1.8 km	MPC · JPL
326430	2001 TY_{240}	—	October 14, 2001	Socorro	LINEAR	·	2.5 km	MPC · JPL
326431	2001 TM_{250}	—	October 14, 2001	Apache Point	SDSS	·	2.0 km	MPC · JPL
326432	2001 UG_{34}	—	October 16, 2001	Socorro	LINEAR	·	2.2 km	MPC · JPL
326433	2001 UF_{48}	—	October 17, 2001	Socorro	LINEAR	·	2.0 km	MPC · JPL
326434	2001 UQ_{66}	—	October 19, 2001	Socorro	LINEAR	·	1.6 km	MPC · JPL
326435	2001 UO_{99}	—	October 17, 2001	Socorro	LINEAR	·	1.2 km	MPC · JPL
326436	2001 UK_{122}	—	October 22, 2001	Socorro	LINEAR	·	2.9 km	MPC · JPL
326437	2001 UB_{145}	—	October 23, 2001	Socorro	LINEAR	·	1.8 km	MPC · JPL
326438	2001 UT_{179}	—	October 26, 2001	Haleakala	NEAT	·	2.5 km	MPC · JPL
326439	2001 UO_{202}	—	October 19, 2001	Kitt Peak	Spacewatch	·	1.7 km	MPC · JPL
326440	2001 UZ_{206}	—	October 20, 2001	Socorro	LINEAR	JUN	1.4 km	MPC · JPL
326441	2001 UV_{228}	—	October 29, 2001	Palomar	NEAT	·	2.2 km	MPC · JPL
326442	2001 VF	—	November 6, 2001	Socorro	LINEAR	·	3.8 km	MPC · JPL
326443	2001 VT_{21}	—	November 9, 2001	Socorro	LINEAR	·	1.9 km	MPC · JPL
326444	2001 VJ_{25}	—	November 9, 2001	Socorro	LINEAR	RAF	1.2 km	MPC · JPL
326445	2001 VT_{50}	—	November 10, 2001	Socorro	LINEAR	·	2.4 km	MPC · JPL
326446	2001 VK_{63}	—	November 10, 2001	Socorro	LINEAR	·	1.9 km	MPC · JPL
326447	2001 VM_{64}	—	November 10, 2001	Socorro	LINEAR	·	2.2 km	MPC · JPL
326448	2001 VA_{83}	—	November 10, 2001	Socorro	LINEAR	HNS	1.7 km	MPC · JPL
326449	2001 VP_{89}	—	November 12, 2001	Socorro	LINEAR	EUN	1.9 km	MPC · JPL
326450	2001 VZ_{92}	—	November 15, 2001	Socorro	LINEAR	·	2.0 km	MPC · JPL
326451	2001 VE_{107}	—	November 12, 2001	Socorro	LINEAR	(5)	1.6 km	MPC · JPL
326452	2001 VV_{133}	—	November 11, 2001	Apache Point	SDSS	·	1.5 km	MPC · JPL
326453	2001 WR_{24}	—	November 18, 2001	Kitt Peak	Spacewatch	·	1.7 km	MPC · JPL
326454	2001 WV_{27}	—	November 17, 2001	Socorro	LINEAR	·	1.9 km	MPC · JPL
326455	2001 WL_{53}	—	November 19, 2001	Socorro	LINEAR	·	1.6 km	MPC · JPL
326456	2001 WU_{97}	—	November 19, 2001	Anderson Mesa	LONEOS	·	1.6 km	MPC · JPL
326457	2001 XZ_{23}	—	December 9, 2001	Socorro	LINEAR	·	2.4 km	MPC · JPL
326458	2001 XN_{36}	—	December 9, 2001	Socorro	LINEAR	·	2.5 km	MPC · JPL
326459	2001 XC_{92}	—	December 10, 2001	Socorro	LINEAR	·	2.0 km	MPC · JPL
326460	2001 XZ_{109}	—	November 19, 2001	Anderson Mesa	LONEOS	·	2.1 km	MPC · JPL
326461	2001 XT_{116}	—	December 13, 2001	Socorro	LINEAR	·	2.2 km	MPC · JPL
326462	2001 XG_{153}	—	December 14, 2001	Socorro	LINEAR	·	2.4 km	MPC · JPL
326463	2001 XA_{219}	—	December 15, 2001	Socorro	LINEAR	EUN	1.7 km	MPC · JPL
326464	2001 YL_{31}	—	December 18, 2001	Socorro	LINEAR	·	2.6 km	MPC · JPL
326465	2001 YE_{61}	—	December 18, 2001	Socorro	LINEAR	DOR	2.6 km	MPC · JPL
326466	2001 YG_{117}	—	December 18, 2001	Socorro	LINEAR	·	2.6 km	MPC · JPL
326467	2001 YW_{124}	—	December 9, 2001	Socorro	LINEAR	·	2.6 km	MPC · JPL
326468	2002 AF_{33}	—	January 6, 2002	Kitt Peak	Spacewatch	·	2.3 km	MPC · JPL
326469	2002 AL_{54}	—	January 9, 2002	Socorro	LINEAR	GEF	1.5 km	MPC · JPL
326470	2002 AS_{81}	—	January 9, 2002	Socorro	LINEAR	·	2.7 km	MPC · JPL
326471	2002 AT_{126}	—	January 13, 2002	Socorro	LINEAR	MRX	1.1 km	MPC · JPL
326472	2002 AK_{138}	—	January 9, 2002	Socorro	LINEAR	(194)	2.1 km	MPC · JPL
326473	2002 AY_{157}	—	January 13, 2002	Socorro	LINEAR	·	2.5 km	MPC · JPL
326474	2002 AY_{168}	—	January 15, 2002	Socorro	LINEAR	DOR	2.8 km	MPC · JPL
326475	2002 AL_{173}	—	January 14, 2002	Socorro	LINEAR	·	1.9 km	MPC · JPL
326476	2002 AQ_{173}	—	January 14, 2002	Socorro	LINEAR	·	2.5 km	MPC · JPL
326477	2002 AX_{209}	—	January 9, 2002	Apache Point	SDSS	·	1.8 km	MPC · JPL
326478	2002 BN_{2}	—	January 19, 2002	Kitt Peak	Spacewatch	·	2.0 km	MPC · JPL
326479	2002 CP_{8}	—	February 5, 2002	Palomar	NEAT	DOR	2.9 km	MPC · JPL
326480	2002 CN_{48}	—	February 3, 2002	Haleakala	NEAT	·	2.6 km	MPC · JPL
326481	2002 CH_{54}	—	February 7, 2002	Socorro	LINEAR	GEF	2.1 km	MPC · JPL
326482	2002 CQ_{61}	—	February 6, 2002	Socorro	LINEAR	·	3.0 km	MPC · JPL
326483	2002 CR_{173}	—	February 8, 2002	Socorro	LINEAR	·	2.5 km	MPC · JPL
326484	2002 CK_{189}	—	February 10, 2002	Socorro	LINEAR	·	2.1 km	MPC · JPL
326485	2002 EQ_{6}	—	March 6, 2002	Siding Spring	R. H. McNaught	·	530 m	MPC · JPL
326486	2002 EJ_{40}	—	March 9, 2002	Socorro	LINEAR	·	2.8 km	MPC · JPL
326487	2002 EC_{51}	—	March 6, 2002	Siding Spring	R. H. McNaught	·	2.0 km	MPC · JPL
326488	2002 GU_{2}	—	April 4, 2002	Haleakala	NEAT	·	910 m	MPC · JPL
326489	2002 GJ_{29}	—	April 7, 2002	Cerro Tololo	M. W. Buie	·	2.1 km	MPC · JPL
326490	2002 GB_{87}	—	April 10, 2002	Socorro	LINEAR	·	3.1 km	MPC · JPL
326491	2002 GE_{98}	—	April 10, 2002	Socorro	LINEAR	·	900 m	MPC · JPL
326492	2002 GR_{172}	—	April 10, 2002	Socorro	LINEAR	·	720 m	MPC · JPL
326493	2002 GG_{173}	—	April 10, 2002	Socorro	LINEAR	·	960 m	MPC · JPL
326494	2002 GX_{184}	—	April 12, 2002	Palomar	NEAT	·	660 m	MPC · JPL
326495	2002 HN_{7}	—	April 19, 2002	Kitt Peak	Spacewatch	·	2.0 km	MPC · JPL
326496	2002 HU_{8}	—	April 21, 2002	Kitt Peak	Spacewatch	·	2.0 km	MPC · JPL
326497	2002 JG_{4}	—	May 5, 2002	Socorro	LINEAR	PHO	1.2 km	MPC · JPL
326498	2002 JE_{10}	—	May 7, 2002	Socorro	LINEAR	·	1.1 km	MPC · JPL
326499	2002 JJ_{65}	—	May 9, 2002	Socorro	LINEAR	·	2.8 km	MPC · JPL
326500	2002 JJ_{85}	—	May 11, 2002	Socorro	LINEAR	·	780 m	MPC · JPL

== 326501–326600 ==
back to top

Designation			Discovery			Properties		Ref
Permanent	Provisional	Named after	Date	Site	Discoverer(s)	Category	Diam.	Ref
326501	2002 JD_{128}	—	May 7, 2002	Palomar	NEAT	·	860 m	MPC · JPL
326502	2002 JF_{138}	—	May 9, 2002	Palomar	NEAT	·	2.6 km	MPC · JPL
326503	2002 JE_{140}	—	May 10, 2002	Palomar	NEAT	·	2.3 km	MPC · JPL
326504	2002 KK_{16}	—	May 18, 2002	Palomar	NEAT	·	3.5 km	MPC · JPL
326505	2002 LV_{5}	—	June 5, 2002	Palomar	NEAT	·	930 m	MPC · JPL
326506	2002 LB_{45}	—	June 5, 2002	Anderson Mesa	LONEOS	·	2.9 km	MPC · JPL
326507	2002 LB_{54}	—	June 1, 2002	Palomar	NEAT	·	890 m	MPC · JPL
326508	2002 LR_{61}	—	June 1, 2002	Palomar	NEAT	EOS	2.4 km	MPC · JPL
326509	2002 LQ_{62}	—	June 1, 2002	Palomar	NEAT	·	4.8 km	MPC · JPL
326510	2002 MH_{6}	—	June 16, 2002	Palomar	NEAT	·	3.2 km	MPC · JPL
326511	2002 NQ_{6}	—	July 11, 2002	Campo Imperatore	CINEOS	MAS	820 m	MPC · JPL
326512	2002 NS_{6}	—	July 11, 2002	Campo Imperatore	CINEOS	THM	2.2 km	MPC · JPL
326513	2002 NB_{30}	—	July 5, 2002	Kitt Peak	Spacewatch	·	3.2 km	MPC · JPL
326514	2002 NT_{39}	—	July 5, 2002	Palomar	NEAT	·	4.4 km	MPC · JPL
326515	2002 NB_{48}	—	July 14, 2002	Palomar	NEAT	·	970 m	MPC · JPL
326516	2002 NS_{48}	—	June 16, 2002	Palomar	NEAT	·	3.1 km	MPC · JPL
326517	2002 NW_{50}	—	July 15, 2002	Palomar	NEAT	·	5.1 km	MPC · JPL
326518	2002 NW_{54}	—	July 5, 2002	Palomar	NEAT	·	2.7 km	MPC · JPL
326519	2002 NR_{60}	—	July 4, 2002	Palomar	NEAT	·	670 m	MPC · JPL
326520	2002 NP_{62}	—	July 5, 2002	Palomar	NEAT	·	3.8 km	MPC · JPL
326521	2002 NZ_{63}	—	March 18, 2005	Catalina	CSS	·	850 m	MPC · JPL
326522	2002 NS_{64}	—	July 2, 2002	Palomar	NEAT	·	1.1 km	MPC · JPL
326523	2002 NC_{70}	—	July 3, 2002	Palomar	NEAT	·	3.0 km	MPC · JPL
326524	2002 NV_{70}	—	July 9, 2002	Palomar	NEAT	EOS	2.5 km	MPC · JPL
326525	2002 NF_{76}	—	September 3, 2008	Kitt Peak	Spacewatch	·	2.7 km	MPC · JPL
326526	2002 OF_{6}	—	July 20, 2002	Palomar	NEAT	·	3.0 km	MPC · JPL
326527	2002 OM_{7}	—	July 20, 2002	Palomar	NEAT	·	3.0 km	MPC · JPL
326528	2002 OP_{8}	—	July 19, 2002	Palomar	NEAT	·	4.3 km	MPC · JPL
326529	2002 OE_{9}	—	July 21, 2002	Palomar	NEAT	·	1.4 km	MPC · JPL
326530	2002 OA_{19}	—	July 20, 2002	Palomar	NEAT	·	730 m	MPC · JPL
326531	2002 OO_{19}	—	July 21, 2002	Palomar	NEAT	PHO	1.2 km	MPC · JPL
326532	2002 OX_{19}	—	July 22, 2002	Palomar	NEAT	·	640 m	MPC · JPL
326533	2002 OC_{26}	—	July 23, 2002	Palomar	NEAT	·	4.0 km	MPC · JPL
326534	2002 OR_{29}	—	July 29, 2002	Palomar	NEAT	MAS	810 m	MPC · JPL
326535	2002 OU_{33}	—	July 21, 2002	Palomar	NEAT	·	1.2 km	MPC · JPL
326536	2002 OU_{35}	—	September 1, 2008	Dauban	Kugel, F.	·	3.4 km	MPC · JPL
326537	2002 OR_{36}	—	October 23, 2003	Kitt Peak	Spacewatch	VER	3.2 km	MPC · JPL
326538	2002 PO_{1}	—	August 4, 2002	Palomar	NEAT	·	4.5 km	MPC · JPL
326539	2002 PF_{4}	—	August 4, 2002	Palomar	NEAT	·	3.4 km	MPC · JPL
326540	2002 PV_{9}	—	August 5, 2002	Palomar	NEAT	·	5.0 km	MPC · JPL
326541	2002 PX_{11}	—	August 4, 2002	Palomar	NEAT	EOS	2.2 km	MPC · JPL
326542	2002 PC_{17}	—	August 6, 2002	Palomar	NEAT	·	2.6 km	MPC · JPL
326543	2002 PQ_{18}	—	August 6, 2002	Palomar	NEAT	EOS	3.0 km	MPC · JPL
326544	2002 PT_{22}	—	August 6, 2002	Palomar	NEAT	·	1.2 km	MPC · JPL
326545	2002 PS_{32}	—	August 6, 2002	Palomar	NEAT	·	6.4 km	MPC · JPL
326546	2002 PR_{36}	—	August 6, 2002	Palomar	NEAT	HYG	3.3 km	MPC · JPL
326547	2002 PV_{47}	—	August 10, 2002	Socorro	LINEAR	PHO	1.2 km	MPC · JPL
326548	2002 PM_{68}	—	August 6, 2002	Palomar	NEAT	·	1.1 km	MPC · JPL
326549	2002 PZ_{70}	—	August 11, 2002	Socorro	LINEAR	·	3.4 km	MPC · JPL
326550	2002 PC_{73}	—	July 9, 2002	Socorro	LINEAR	·	4.0 km	MPC · JPL
326551	2002 PM_{76}	—	August 11, 2002	Palomar	NEAT	·	3.6 km	MPC · JPL
326552	2002 PP_{77}	—	August 11, 2002	Haleakala	NEAT	·	4.5 km	MPC · JPL
326553	2002 PJ_{101}	—	August 12, 2002	Socorro	LINEAR	·	3.7 km	MPC · JPL
326554	2002 PZ_{118}	—	August 13, 2002	Anderson Mesa	LONEOS	·	3.5 km	MPC · JPL
326555	2002 PE_{122}	—	August 13, 2002	Anderson Mesa	LONEOS	·	4.2 km	MPC · JPL
326556	2002 PR_{135}	—	August 14, 2002	Socorro	LINEAR	TIR	3.9 km	MPC · JPL
326557	2002 PM_{156}	—	August 8, 2002	Palomar	S. F. Hönig	THM	2.5 km	MPC · JPL
326558	2002 PP_{165}	—	August 13, 2002	Kitt Peak	Spacewatch	VER	3.0 km	MPC · JPL
326559	2002 PG_{166}	—	August 8, 2002	Palomar	Lowe, A.	THM	2.6 km	MPC · JPL
326560	2002 PS_{166}	—	August 11, 2002	Haleakala	NEAT	·	820 m	MPC · JPL
326561	2002 PZ_{174}	—	August 15, 2002	Palomar	NEAT	HYG	3.1 km	MPC · JPL
326562	2002 PD_{175}	—	August 11, 2002	Palomar	NEAT	·	3.2 km	MPC · JPL
326563	2002 PT_{176}	—	August 6, 2002	Palomar	NEAT	·	3.1 km	MPC · JPL
326564	2002 PU_{176}	—	August 11, 2002	Palomar	NEAT	·	3.6 km	MPC · JPL
326565	2002 PN_{180}	—	August 8, 2002	Palomar	NEAT	·	5.2 km	MPC · JPL
326566	2002 PB_{186}	—	August 6, 2002	Palomar	NEAT	EOS	2.5 km	MPC · JPL
326567	2002 PJ_{195}	—	October 22, 2003	Apache Point	SDSS	·	2.8 km	MPC · JPL
326568	2002 PE_{196}	—	November 26, 2003	Kitt Peak	Spacewatch	·	3.7 km	MPC · JPL
326569	2002 QN_{1}	—	August 16, 2002	Haleakala	NEAT	·	4.1 km	MPC · JPL
326570	2002 QD_{11}	—	August 24, 2002	Palomar	NEAT	·	1.3 km	MPC · JPL
326571	2002 QT_{16}	—	August 27, 2002	Palomar	NEAT	·	3.8 km	MPC · JPL
326572	2002 QD_{22}	—	August 27, 2002	Palomar	NEAT	V	550 m	MPC · JPL
326573	2002 QG_{30}	—	August 29, 2002	Palomar	NEAT	NYS	890 m	MPC · JPL
326574	2002 QO_{33}	—	August 29, 2002	Palomar	NEAT	NYS	1.2 km	MPC · JPL
326575	2002 QY_{35}	—	August 29, 2002	Palomar	NEAT	·	1.6 km	MPC · JPL
326576	2002 QB_{45}	—	August 30, 2002	Palomar	NEAT	·	4.0 km	MPC · JPL
326577	2002 QQ_{56}	—	August 17, 2002	Haleakala	NEAT	EOS	2.5 km	MPC · JPL
326578	2002 QB_{62}	—	August 17, 2002	Palomar	NEAT	·	1.0 km	MPC · JPL
326579	2002 QB_{70}	—	August 28, 2002	Palomar	NEAT	·	4.1 km	MPC · JPL
326580	2002 QM_{71}	—	August 28, 2002	Palomar	NEAT	·	2.7 km	MPC · JPL
326581	2002 QA_{88}	—	August 27, 2002	Palomar	NEAT	·	4.2 km	MPC · JPL
326582	2002 QO_{90}	—	August 19, 2002	Palomar	NEAT	·	1.2 km	MPC · JPL
326583	2002 QY_{94}	—	August 18, 2002	Palomar	NEAT	NYS	1.0 km	MPC · JPL
326584	2002 QQ_{95}	—	August 18, 2002	Palomar	NEAT	NYS	960 m	MPC · JPL
326585	2002 QO_{101}	—	August 28, 2002	Palomar	NEAT	·	2.9 km	MPC · JPL
326586	2002 QA_{104}	—	August 16, 2002	Palomar	NEAT	LIX	3.3 km	MPC · JPL
326587	2002 QD_{107}	—	August 29, 2002	Palomar	NEAT	·	5.8 km	MPC · JPL
326588	2002 QL_{108}	—	August 17, 2002	Palomar	NEAT	·	950 m	MPC · JPL
326589	2002 QR_{115}	—	August 19, 2002	Palomar	NEAT	(43176)	4.4 km	MPC · JPL
326590	2002 QQ_{122}	—	August 27, 2002	Palomar	NEAT	T_{j} (2.98)	3.3 km	MPC · JPL
326591	2002 QF_{125}	—	August 19, 2002	Palomar	NEAT	·	4.3 km	MPC · JPL
326592	2002 QN_{129}	—	August 17, 2002	Palomar	NEAT	·	1.8 km	MPC · JPL
326593	2002 QJ_{133}	—	August 17, 2002	Palomar	NEAT	·	4.5 km	MPC · JPL
326594	2002 QP_{142}	—	February 27, 2006	Mount Lemmon	Mount Lemmon Survey	·	3.1 km	MPC · JPL
326595	2002 QK_{145}	—	January 15, 2005	Kitt Peak	Spacewatch	·	3.7 km	MPC · JPL
326596	2002 QB_{146}	—	February 27, 2006	Kitt Peak	Spacewatch	·	2.7 km	MPC · JPL
326597	2002 RF	—	September 1, 2002	Palomar	NEAT	·	1.7 km	MPC · JPL
326598	2002 RH_{4}	—	September 3, 2002	Palomar	NEAT	·	2.8 km	MPC · JPL
326599	2002 RY_{4}	—	September 3, 2002	Palomar	NEAT	·	4.4 km	MPC · JPL
326600	2002 RO_{5}	—	September 3, 2002	Palomar	NEAT	·	1.3 km	MPC · JPL

== 326601–326700 ==
back to top

Designation			Discovery			Properties		Ref
Permanent	Provisional	Named after	Date	Site	Discoverer(s)	Category	Diam.	Ref
326601	2002 RL_{8}	—	September 3, 2002	Haleakala	NEAT	·	720 m	MPC · JPL
326602	2002 RU_{12}	—	September 4, 2002	Anderson Mesa	LONEOS	·	1.8 km	MPC · JPL
326603	2002 RC_{26}	—	September 3, 2002	Haleakala	NEAT	·	1.0 km	MPC · JPL
326604	2002 RD_{30}	—	September 4, 2002	Anderson Mesa	LONEOS	·	3.6 km	MPC · JPL
326605	2002 RW_{31}	—	September 4, 2002	Anderson Mesa	LONEOS	·	6.5 km	MPC · JPL
326606	2002 RR_{37}	—	September 5, 2002	Anderson Mesa	LONEOS	·	910 m	MPC · JPL
326607	2002 RH_{50}	—	August 31, 2002	Anderson Mesa	LONEOS	·	3.9 km	MPC · JPL
326608	2002 RS_{52}	—	September 5, 2002	Socorro	LINEAR	·	1.4 km	MPC · JPL
326609	2002 RR_{53}	—	September 5, 2002	Socorro	LINEAR	·	1.6 km	MPC · JPL
326610	2002 RP_{70}	—	September 4, 2002	Palomar	NEAT	·	5.4 km	MPC · JPL
326611	2002 RK_{72}	—	September 5, 2002	Socorro	LINEAR	·	1.4 km	MPC · JPL
326612	2002 RM_{73}	—	September 5, 2002	Socorro	LINEAR	·	1.3 km	MPC · JPL
326613	2002 RL_{105}	—	September 5, 2002	Socorro	LINEAR	·	1.7 km	MPC · JPL
326614	2002 RD_{112}	—	September 6, 2002	Socorro	LINEAR	·	1.1 km	MPC · JPL
326615	2002 RS_{115}	—	September 6, 2002	Socorro	LINEAR	·	3.5 km	MPC · JPL
326616	2002 RW_{126}	—	September 9, 2002	Palomar	NEAT	·	1.6 km	MPC · JPL
326617	2002 RA_{127}	—	September 10, 2002	Palomar	NEAT	·	3.7 km	MPC · JPL
326618	2002 RG_{139}	—	September 10, 2002	Haleakala	NEAT	·	1.8 km	MPC · JPL
326619	2002 RT_{159}	—	September 12, 2002	Palomar	NEAT	·	3.5 km	MPC · JPL
326620	2002 RH_{163}	—	September 12, 2002	Palomar	NEAT	THM	2.5 km	MPC · JPL
326621	2002 RZ_{172}	—	September 13, 2002	Socorro	LINEAR	·	4.4 km	MPC · JPL
326622	2002 RG_{191}	—	September 15, 2002	Haleakala	NEAT	PHO	1.2 km	MPC · JPL
326623	2002 RO_{196}	—	September 12, 2002	Palomar	NEAT	LIX	6.2 km	MPC · JPL
326624	2002 RG_{204}	—	September 14, 2002	Palomar	NEAT	·	810 m	MPC · JPL
326625	2002 RL_{210}	—	September 15, 2002	Kitt Peak	Spacewatch	·	1.1 km	MPC · JPL
326626	2002 RB_{223}	—	September 15, 2002	Haleakala	NEAT	·	1.5 km	MPC · JPL
326627	2002 RW_{242}	—	September 14, 2002	Palomar	NEAT	·	2.9 km	MPC · JPL
326628	2002 RT_{248}	—	September 14, 2002	Palomar	NEAT	·	3.6 km	MPC · JPL
326629	2002 RF_{249}	—	September 15, 2002	Xinglong	SCAP	·	4.6 km	MPC · JPL
326630	2002 RZ_{249}	—	September 13, 2002	Palomar	NEAT	V	550 m	MPC · JPL
326631	2002 RU_{278}	—	September 3, 2002	Palomar	NEAT	PHO	1.0 km	MPC · JPL
326632	2002 RJ_{281}	—	March 25, 2006	Kitt Peak	Spacewatch	VER	3.2 km	MPC · JPL
326633	2002 SU_{5}	—	September 27, 2002	Palomar	NEAT	NYS	870 m	MPC · JPL
326634	2002 SB_{11}	—	September 27, 2002	Palomar	NEAT	·	3.4 km	MPC · JPL
326635	2002 ST_{20}	—	September 26, 2002	Palomar	NEAT	V	800 m	MPC · JPL
326636	2002 SX_{23}	—	September 27, 2002	Socorro	LINEAR	PHO	1.3 km	MPC · JPL
326637	2002 SB_{24}	—	September 27, 2002	Socorro	LINEAR	·	6.3 km	MPC · JPL
326638	2002 SS_{25}	—	September 28, 2002	Haleakala	NEAT	·	1.9 km	MPC · JPL
326639	2002 SL_{26}	—	September 29, 2002	Haleakala	NEAT	NYS	670 m	MPC · JPL
326640	2002 SE_{29}	—	September 28, 2002	Palomar	NEAT	·	1.4 km	MPC · JPL
326641	2002 SZ_{31}	—	September 28, 2002	Haleakala	NEAT	·	1.5 km	MPC · JPL
326642	2002 SG_{46}	—	September 29, 2002	Haleakala	NEAT	NYS	1.5 km	MPC · JPL
326643	2002 ST_{47}	—	September 30, 2002	Socorro	LINEAR	·	4.1 km	MPC · JPL
326644	2002 SX_{48}	—	September 30, 2002	Socorro	LINEAR	·	4.3 km	MPC · JPL
326645	2002 SA_{56}	—	September 30, 2002	Socorro	LINEAR	V	870 m	MPC · JPL
326646	2002 TE	—	October 1, 2002	Haleakala	NEAT	·	920 m	MPC · JPL
326647	2002 TM_{20}	—	October 2, 2002	Socorro	LINEAR	·	1.4 km	MPC · JPL
326648	2002 TE_{39}	—	October 2, 2002	Socorro	LINEAR	·	2.0 km	MPC · JPL
326649	2002 TB_{55}	—	October 2, 2002	Haleakala	NEAT	NYS	1.2 km	MPC · JPL
326650	2002 TG_{60}	—	October 3, 2002	Palomar	NEAT	H	790 m	MPC · JPL
326651	2002 TM_{66}	—	October 3, 2002	Socorro	LINEAR	PHO	1.7 km	MPC · JPL
326652	2002 TS_{99}	—	October 4, 2002	Socorro	LINEAR	V	800 m	MPC · JPL
326653	2002 TR_{103}	—	October 4, 2002	Socorro	LINEAR	·	1.1 km	MPC · JPL
326654	2002 TE_{124}	—	October 4, 2002	Palomar	NEAT	·	5.5 km	MPC · JPL
326655	2002 TM_{159}	—	October 5, 2002	Palomar	NEAT	·	780 m	MPC · JPL
326656	2002 TM_{200}	—	October 4, 2002	Socorro	LINEAR	·	1.4 km	MPC · JPL
326657	2002 TK_{205}	—	October 4, 2002	Socorro	LINEAR	H	590 m	MPC · JPL
326658	2002 TL_{221}	—	October 6, 2002	Socorro	LINEAR	·	5.1 km	MPC · JPL
326659	2002 TO_{224}	—	October 8, 2002	Anderson Mesa	LONEOS	·	1.5 km	MPC · JPL
326660	2002 TO_{234}	—	October 6, 2002	Socorro	LINEAR	T_{j} (2.99)	4.4 km	MPC · JPL
326661	2002 TS_{267}	—	October 8, 2002	Anderson Mesa	LONEOS	·	1.4 km	MPC · JPL
326662	2002 TT_{304}	—	October 15, 2002	Palomar	NEAT	V	790 m	MPC · JPL
326663	2002 TW_{324}	—	October 5, 2002	Apache Point	SDSS	·	3.2 km	MPC · JPL
326664	2002 TK_{347}	—	October 5, 2002	Apache Point	SDSS	V	800 m	MPC · JPL
326665	2002 TH_{366}	—	October 6, 2002	Haleakala	NEAT	·	1.2 km	MPC · JPL
326666	2002 UJ_{1}	—	October 28, 2002	Kitt Peak	Spacewatch	·	1.7 km	MPC · JPL
326667	2002 UZ_{3}	—	October 29, 2002	Palomar	NEAT	PHO	1.6 km	MPC · JPL
326668	2002 UC_{5}	—	October 28, 2002	Palomar	NEAT	·	5.1 km	MPC · JPL
326669	2002 UX_{9}	—	October 26, 2002	Haleakala	NEAT	·	1.9 km	MPC · JPL
326670	2002 UU_{39}	—	October 31, 2002	Palomar	NEAT	V	940 m	MPC · JPL
326671	2002 UF_{48}	—	October 31, 2002	Socorro	LINEAR	T_{j} (2.98)	7.0 km	MPC · JPL
326672	2002 UA_{64}	—	October 30, 2002	Apache Point	SDSS	·	850 m	MPC · JPL
326673	2002 VB_{5}	—	November 1, 2002	Socorro	LINEAR	PHO	1.6 km	MPC · JPL
326674	2002 VL_{12}	—	November 4, 2002	Anderson Mesa	LONEOS	·	3.1 km	MPC · JPL
326675	2002 VC_{108}	—	November 12, 2002	Socorro	LINEAR	·	1.3 km	MPC · JPL
326676	2002 VR_{115}	—	November 11, 2002	Anderson Mesa	LONEOS	H	600 m	MPC · JPL
326677	2002 VX_{115}	—	November 11, 2002	Socorro	LINEAR	V	770 m	MPC · JPL
326678	2002 VM_{116}	—	November 12, 2002	Palomar	NEAT	·	1.9 km	MPC · JPL
326679	2002 VH_{127}	—	November 14, 2002	Socorro	LINEAR	·	1.9 km	MPC · JPL
326680	2002 VM_{134}	—	November 6, 2002	Socorro	LINEAR	·	4.1 km	MPC · JPL
326681	2002 VK_{140}	—	November 13, 2002	Palomar	NEAT	RAF	990 m	MPC · JPL
326682	2002 VO_{147}	—	November 14, 2002	Palomar	NEAT	·	1.5 km	MPC · JPL
326683	2002 WP	—	November 18, 2002	Palomar	NEAT	AMO	520 m	MPC · JPL
326684	2002 XJ_{9}	—	December 2, 2002	Socorro	LINEAR	MAS	1.1 km	MPC · JPL
326685	2002 XT_{35}	—	December 7, 2002	Desert Eagle	W. K. Y. Yeung	V	940 m	MPC · JPL
326686	2002 XM_{43}	—	December 1, 2002	Socorro	LINEAR	(5)	1.0 km	MPC · JPL
326687	2002 XZ_{70}	—	December 10, 2002	Socorro	LINEAR	·	1.4 km	MPC · JPL
326688	2002 XG_{79}	—	December 11, 2002	Socorro	LINEAR	·	1.6 km	MPC · JPL
326689	2002 XO_{80}	—	December 11, 2002	Socorro	LINEAR	BAR	1.5 km	MPC · JPL
326690	2002 XY_{107}	—	December 5, 2002	Socorro	LINEAR	·	1.6 km	MPC · JPL
326691	2002 XK_{116}	—	December 11, 2002	Apache Point	SDSS	EUN	1.3 km	MPC · JPL
326692	2002 YP_{30}	—	December 31, 2002	Socorro	LINEAR	·	1.4 km	MPC · JPL
326693	2003 AR_{1}	—	January 1, 2003	Socorro	LINEAR	(5)	2.2 km	MPC · JPL
326694	2003 AN_{20}	—	January 5, 2003	Socorro	LINEAR	(5)	1.6 km	MPC · JPL
326695	2003 AJ_{27}	—	January 4, 2003	Socorro	LINEAR	·	2.3 km	MPC · JPL
326696	2003 AM_{46}	—	January 5, 2003	Socorro	LINEAR	·	1.8 km	MPC · JPL
326697	2003 AY_{52}	—	January 5, 2003	Socorro	LINEAR	·	1.7 km	MPC · JPL
326698	2003 AD_{78}	—	January 10, 2003	Socorro	LINEAR	·	1.8 km	MPC · JPL
326699	2003 BF_{2}	—	January 25, 2003	Palomar	NEAT	·	4.1 km	MPC · JPL
326700	2003 BM_{2}	—	January 25, 2003	Anderson Mesa	LONEOS	·	1.7 km	MPC · JPL

== 326701–326800 ==
back to top

Designation			Discovery			Properties		Ref
Permanent	Provisional	Named after	Date	Site	Discoverer(s)	Category	Diam.	Ref
326701	2003 BK_{7}	—	January 25, 2003	Kitt Peak	Spacewatch	ADE	2.5 km	MPC · JPL
326702	2003 BD_{49}	—	January 26, 2003	Haleakala	NEAT	·	1.7 km	MPC · JPL
326703	2003 BX_{49}	—	January 27, 2003	Socorro	LINEAR	·	1.2 km	MPC · JPL
326704	2003 BP_{55}	—	January 28, 2003	Socorro	LINEAR	·	1.6 km	MPC · JPL
326705	2003 BQ_{66}	—	January 30, 2003	Anderson Mesa	LONEOS	EUN	1.7 km	MPC · JPL
326706	2003 BY_{74}	—	January 29, 2003	Palomar	NEAT	EUN	1.2 km	MPC · JPL
326707	2003 BM_{76}	—	January 29, 2003	Palomar	NEAT	·	2.3 km	MPC · JPL
326708	2003 BN_{77}	—	January 30, 2003	Anderson Mesa	LONEOS	·	1.6 km	MPC · JPL
326709	2003 BQ_{83}	—	January 31, 2003	Socorro	LINEAR	·	2.0 km	MPC · JPL
326710	2003 BV_{92}	—	January 26, 2003	Haleakala	NEAT	EUN	1.4 km	MPC · JPL
326711	2003 CW_{10}	—	February 3, 2003	Anderson Mesa	LONEOS	·	1.7 km	MPC · JPL
326712	2003 CC_{15}	—	February 4, 2003	Socorro	LINEAR	·	1.9 km	MPC · JPL
326713	2003 CS_{16}	—	February 8, 2003	Socorro	LINEAR	JUN	1.2 km	MPC · JPL
326714	2003 DL_{7}	—	February 23, 2003	Campo Imperatore	CINEOS	(5)	1.5 km	MPC · JPL
326715	2003 EO_{14}	—	March 6, 2003	Anderson Mesa	LONEOS	·	1.6 km	MPC · JPL
326716	2003 ED_{16}	—	March 7, 2003	Socorro	LINEAR	·	1.7 km	MPC · JPL
326717	2003 EA_{17}	—	March 7, 2003	Socorro	LINEAR	·	2.2 km	MPC · JPL
326718	2003 EE_{31}	—	March 6, 2003	Palomar	NEAT	EUN	1.3 km	MPC · JPL
326719	2003 ED_{36}	—	March 7, 2003	Anderson Mesa	LONEOS	·	1.9 km	MPC · JPL
326720	2003 EH_{47}	—	January 14, 2003	Palomar	NEAT	JUN	1.6 km	MPC · JPL
326721	2003 EZ_{62}	—	March 14, 2003	Palomar	NEAT	·	2.1 km	MPC · JPL
326722	2003 FZ_{28}	—	March 24, 2003	Haleakala	NEAT	·	2.5 km	MPC · JPL
326723	2003 FF_{67}	—	March 26, 2003	Palomar	NEAT	·	2.3 km	MPC · JPL
326724	2003 FD_{77}	—	March 27, 2003	Palomar	NEAT	JUN	1.4 km	MPC · JPL
326725	2003 FJ_{94}	—	March 29, 2003	Anderson Mesa	LONEOS	·	2.9 km	MPC · JPL
326726	2003 FD_{131}	—	March 23, 2003	Apache Point	SDSS	·	2.6 km	MPC · JPL
326727	2003 GT_{10}	—	April 3, 2003	Haleakala	NEAT	EUN	1.7 km	MPC · JPL
326728	2003 GQ_{42}	—	April 7, 2003	Palomar	NEAT	·	2.7 km	MPC · JPL
326729	2003 GE_{43}	—	April 9, 2003	Palomar	NEAT	JUN	1.4 km	MPC · JPL
326730	2003 GF_{49}	—	April 9, 2003	Kitt Peak	Spacewatch	·	2.7 km	MPC · JPL
326731	2003 GD_{55}	—	April 4, 2003	Anderson Mesa	LONEOS	·	2.2 km	MPC · JPL
326732 Nice	2003 HB_{6}	Nice	April 25, 2003	Anderson Mesa	LONEOS	AMO +1km · moon	1.0 km	MPC · JPL
326733	2003 HN_{15}	—	April 26, 2003	Needville	J. Dellinger, L. L. Ferguson	·	2.7 km	MPC · JPL
326734	2003 JG_{1}	—	May 1, 2003	Kitt Peak	Spacewatch	·	2.6 km	MPC · JPL
326735	2003 JW_{16}	—	May 8, 2003	Haleakala	NEAT	·	2.8 km	MPC · JPL
326736	2003 KM_{1}	—	May 22, 2003	Kitt Peak	Spacewatch	·	2.9 km	MPC · JPL
326737	2003 KC_{2}	—	May 22, 2003	Kitt Peak	Spacewatch	·	4.0 km	MPC · JPL
326738	2003 PA	—	August 1, 2003	Haleakala	NEAT	·	800 m	MPC · JPL
326739	2003 QS_{15}	—	August 20, 2003	Palomar	NEAT	·	780 m	MPC · JPL
326740	2003 QZ_{18}	—	August 22, 2003	Socorro	LINEAR	·	560 m	MPC · JPL
326741	2003 QW_{26}	—	August 22, 2003	Haleakala	NEAT	·	2.4 km	MPC · JPL
326742	2003 QN_{47}	—	August 26, 2003	Socorro	LINEAR	AMO +1km · fast	830 m	MPC · JPL
326743	2003 QF_{69}	—	August 23, 2003	Palomar	NEAT	·	890 m	MPC · JPL
326744	2003 QH_{75}	—	August 24, 2003	Socorro	LINEAR	THB	4.6 km	MPC · JPL
326745	2003 QG_{85}	—	August 24, 2003	Cerro Tololo	M. W. Buie	THM	1.9 km	MPC · JPL
326746	2003 RJ	—	September 1, 2003	Socorro	LINEAR	·	4.7 km	MPC · JPL
326747	2003 RC_{13}	—	September 14, 2003	Haleakala	NEAT	·	730 m	MPC · JPL
326748	2003 RK_{16}	—	September 14, 2003	Haleakala	NEAT	·	820 m	MPC · JPL
326749	2003 RL_{24}	—	September 15, 2003	Anderson Mesa	LONEOS	·	810 m	MPC · JPL
326750	2003 RS_{24}	—	September 15, 2003	Palomar	NEAT	·	3.6 km	MPC · JPL
326751	2003 SK_{12}	—	September 16, 2003	Kitt Peak	Spacewatch	·	3.5 km	MPC · JPL
326752	2003 SD_{28}	—	September 18, 2003	Palomar	NEAT	·	4.8 km	MPC · JPL
326753	2003 SZ_{31}	—	September 16, 2003	Palomar	NEAT	PHO	1.3 km	MPC · JPL
326754	2003 SV_{62}	—	September 17, 2003	Kitt Peak	Spacewatch	EUP	6.2 km	MPC · JPL
326755	2003 SO_{63}	—	September 17, 2003	Kitt Peak	Spacewatch	·	710 m	MPC · JPL
326756	2003 SW_{66}	—	September 19, 2003	Campo Imperatore	CINEOS	·	4.9 km	MPC · JPL
326757	2003 SG_{68}	—	September 17, 2003	Kitt Peak	Spacewatch	EOS	2.0 km	MPC · JPL
326758	2003 SU_{70}	—	September 18, 2003	Kitt Peak	Spacewatch	EOS	2.8 km	MPC · JPL
326759	2003 SQ_{85}	—	September 16, 2003	Palomar	NEAT	·	4.1 km	MPC · JPL
326760	2003 SC_{87}	—	September 17, 2003	Socorro	LINEAR	·	3.3 km	MPC · JPL
326761	2003 SF_{93}	—	September 18, 2003	Kitt Peak	Spacewatch	·	750 m	MPC · JPL
326762	2003 SN_{131}	—	September 21, 2003	Anderson Mesa	LONEOS	·	1.0 km	MPC · JPL
326763	2003 SA_{135}	—	September 18, 2003	Kitt Peak	Spacewatch	·	5.8 km	MPC · JPL
326764	2003 SQ_{141}	—	September 20, 2003	Campo Imperatore	CINEOS	·	3.7 km	MPC · JPL
326765	2003 SJ_{164}	—	September 20, 2003	Anderson Mesa	LONEOS	·	4.1 km	MPC · JPL
326766	2003 SN_{165}	—	September 20, 2003	Anderson Mesa	LONEOS	TIR	3.4 km	MPC · JPL
326767	2003 SH_{177}	—	September 18, 2003	Palomar	NEAT	·	4.3 km	MPC · JPL
326768	2003 SX_{180}	—	September 20, 2003	Socorro	LINEAR	·	660 m	MPC · JPL
326769	2003 SE_{192}	—	September 19, 2003	Palomar	NEAT	·	1.4 km	MPC · JPL
326770	2003 SM_{193}	—	September 20, 2003	Socorro	LINEAR	·	5.2 km	MPC · JPL
326771	2003 SJ_{196}	—	September 20, 2003	Palomar	NEAT	·	4.5 km	MPC · JPL
326772	2003 SQ_{196}	—	September 20, 2003	Palomar	NEAT	EOS	3.1 km	MPC · JPL
326773	2003 SN_{199}	—	September 21, 2003	Anderson Mesa	LONEOS	·	3.2 km	MPC · JPL
326774	2003 SU_{203}	—	September 22, 2003	Anderson Mesa	LONEOS	·	680 m	MPC · JPL
326775	2003 SW_{215}	—	September 25, 2003	Ondřejov	P. Kušnirák	·	1.0 km	MPC · JPL
326776	2003 SL_{220}	—	September 29, 2003	Desert Eagle	W. K. Y. Yeung	(2076)	1.0 km	MPC · JPL
326777	2003 SV_{222}	—	September 30, 2003	Socorro	LINEAR	AMO +1km	990 m	MPC · JPL
326778	2003 SF_{223}	—	September 28, 2003	Desert Eagle	W. K. Y. Yeung	·	5.5 km	MPC · JPL
326779	2003 SM_{224}	—	September 30, 2003	Junk Bond	D. Healy	·	3.9 km	MPC · JPL
326780	2003 SJ_{225}	—	September 26, 2003	Socorro	LINEAR	·	3.3 km	MPC · JPL
326781	2003 SF_{234}	—	September 25, 2003	Palomar	NEAT	EOS	2.6 km	MPC · JPL
326782	2003 SK_{234}	—	September 25, 2003	Palomar	NEAT	·	3.6 km	MPC · JPL
326783	2003 SA_{242}	—	September 27, 2003	Kitt Peak	Spacewatch	·	700 m	MPC · JPL
326784	2003 SX_{244}	—	September 18, 2003	Kitt Peak	Spacewatch	EOS	2.5 km	MPC · JPL
326785	2003 SH_{269}	—	September 20, 2003	Bergisch Gladbach	W. Bickel	·	4.3 km	MPC · JPL
326786	2003 SM_{279}	—	September 17, 2003	Kitt Peak	Spacewatch	EOS	2.5 km	MPC · JPL
326787	2003 SM_{281}	—	September 19, 2003	Kitt Peak	Spacewatch	EOS	2.8 km	MPC · JPL
326788	2003 SC_{284}	—	September 20, 2003	Socorro	LINEAR	·	4.7 km	MPC · JPL
326789	2003 SA_{288}	—	September 30, 2003	Socorro	LINEAR	·	6.4 km	MPC · JPL
326790	2003 SQ_{288}	—	September 28, 2003	Socorro	LINEAR	·	1.3 km	MPC · JPL
326791	2003 SJ_{292}	—	September 25, 2003	Palomar	NEAT	·	4.1 km	MPC · JPL
326792	2003 SR_{293}	—	September 18, 2003	Palomar	NEAT	·	860 m	MPC · JPL
326793	2003 SY_{293}	—	September 28, 2003	Socorro	LINEAR	·	4.1 km	MPC · JPL
326794	2003 SV_{295}	—	September 29, 2003	Anderson Mesa	LONEOS	·	4.6 km	MPC · JPL
326795	2003 SZ_{295}	—	September 29, 2003	Anderson Mesa	LONEOS	·	1.4 km	MPC · JPL
326796	2003 SP_{302}	—	September 17, 2003	Palomar	NEAT	EOS	2.8 km	MPC · JPL
326797	2003 SW_{302}	—	September 17, 2003	Palomar	NEAT	·	2.9 km	MPC · JPL
326798	2003 SF_{313}	—	September 18, 2003	Kitt Peak	Spacewatch	NYS	1.3 km	MPC · JPL
326799	2003 SR_{322}	—	September 18, 2003	Socorro	LINEAR	·	880 m	MPC · JPL
326800	2003 SK_{327}	—	September 18, 2003	Kitt Peak	Spacewatch	·	2.3 km	MPC · JPL

== 326801–326900 ==
back to top

Designation			Discovery			Properties		Ref
Permanent	Provisional	Named after	Date	Site	Discoverer(s)	Category	Diam.	Ref
326801	2003 SW_{332}	—	September 30, 2003	Kitt Peak	Spacewatch	·	840 m	MPC · JPL
326802	2003 SZ_{336}	—	September 27, 2003	Apache Point	SDSS	·	5.2 km	MPC · JPL
326803	2003 SK_{337}	—	September 28, 2003	Apache Point	SDSS	·	3.4 km	MPC · JPL
326804	2003 SG_{339}	—	September 26, 2003	Apache Point	SDSS	·	2.9 km	MPC · JPL
326805	2003 SH_{339}	—	September 26, 2003	Apache Point	SDSS	·	2.6 km	MPC · JPL
326806	2003 SP_{348}	—	March 4, 2005	Kitt Peak	Spacewatch	·	870 m	MPC · JPL
326807	2003 SK_{393}	—	September 26, 2003	Apache Point	SDSS	·	3.6 km	MPC · JPL
326808	2003 SR_{397}	—	September 26, 2003	Apache Point	SDSS	·	3.3 km	MPC · JPL
326809	2003 SK_{418}	—	September 28, 2003	Apache Point	SDSS	VER	3.3 km	MPC · JPL
326810	2003 ST_{429}	—	September 28, 2003	Kitt Peak	Spacewatch	·	2.5 km	MPC · JPL
326811	2003 SS_{431}	—	September 16, 2003	Kitt Peak	Spacewatch	·	3.1 km	MPC · JPL
326812	2003 TG_{1}	—	October 4, 2003	Kingsnake	J. V. McClusky	·	6.7 km	MPC · JPL
326813	2003 TJ_{4}	—	October 2, 2003	Kitt Peak	Spacewatch	·	740 m	MPC · JPL
326814	2003 TN_{9}	—	October 13, 2003	Junk Bond	D. Healy	·	3.9 km	MPC · JPL
326815	2003 TQ_{19}	—	October 15, 2003	Palomar	NEAT	THM	2.5 km	MPC · JPL
326816	2003 TY_{22}	—	October 1, 2003	Kitt Peak	Spacewatch	EOS	1.9 km	MPC · JPL
326817	2003 TH_{27}	—	October 1, 2003	Kitt Peak	Spacewatch	·	3.7 km	MPC · JPL
326818	2003 TG_{39}	—	October 2, 2003	Kitt Peak	Spacewatch	·	5.2 km	MPC · JPL
326819	2003 TN_{44}	—	October 3, 2003	Kitt Peak	Spacewatch	·	3.9 km	MPC · JPL
326820	2003 TM_{45}	—	October 3, 2003	Kitt Peak	Spacewatch	·	4.2 km	MPC · JPL
326821	2003 TV_{50}	—	October 4, 2003	Kitt Peak	Spacewatch	·	2.6 km	MPC · JPL
326822	2003 TQ_{54}	—	October 5, 2003	Kitt Peak	Spacewatch	·	3.7 km	MPC · JPL
326823	2003 TT_{55}	—	October 5, 2003	Kitt Peak	Spacewatch	VER	3.8 km	MPC · JPL
326824	2003 TA_{56}	—	October 5, 2003	Kitt Peak	Spacewatch	VER	3.2 km	MPC · JPL
326825	2003 TF_{59}	—	October 15, 2003	Palomar	NEAT	·	2.8 km	MPC · JPL
326826	2003 UT_{1}	—	October 16, 2003	Kitt Peak	Spacewatch	·	4.2 km	MPC · JPL
326827	2003 UL_{7}	—	October 18, 2003	Junk Bond	D. Healy	·	3.7 km	MPC · JPL
326828	2003 UO_{24}	—	October 23, 2003	Socorro	LINEAR	H	590 m	MPC · JPL
326829	2003 UT_{26}	—	October 25, 2003	Goodricke-Pigott	R. A. Tucker	·	1.9 km	MPC · JPL
326830	2003 UQ_{27}	—	October 16, 2003	Goodricke-Pigott	R. A. Tucker	·	4.5 km	MPC · JPL
326831	2003 UN_{29}	—	October 24, 2003	Socorro	LINEAR	CYB	5.2 km	MPC · JPL
326832	2003 UY_{46}	—	October 21, 2003	Goodricke-Pigott	R. A. Tucker	·	800 m	MPC · JPL
326833	2003 UD_{48}	—	October 16, 2003	Anderson Mesa	LONEOS	·	980 m	MPC · JPL
326834	2003 UZ_{51}	—	October 18, 2003	Palomar	NEAT	·	5.0 km	MPC · JPL
326835	2003 UN_{64}	—	October 16, 2003	Palomar	NEAT	·	4.3 km	MPC · JPL
326836	2003 UC_{70}	—	October 18, 2003	Kitt Peak	Spacewatch	·	610 m	MPC · JPL
326837	2003 UU_{75}	—	October 17, 2003	Kitt Peak	Spacewatch	·	830 m	MPC · JPL
326838	2003 UY_{76}	—	October 17, 2003	Kitt Peak	Spacewatch	·	1.2 km	MPC · JPL
326839	2003 UB_{80}	—	October 17, 2003	Goodricke-Pigott	R. A. Tucker	·	1.1 km	MPC · JPL
326840	2003 UP_{90}	—	October 20, 2003	Socorro	LINEAR	·	750 m	MPC · JPL
326841	2003 UO_{101}	—	October 20, 2003	Socorro	LINEAR	·	4.1 km	MPC · JPL
326842	2003 UV_{111}	—	October 20, 2003	Socorro	LINEAR	·	800 m	MPC · JPL
326843	2003 UM_{113}	—	October 20, 2003	Socorro	LINEAR	·	3.2 km	MPC · JPL
326844	2003 UJ_{116}	—	October 21, 2003	Socorro	LINEAR	·	3.7 km	MPC · JPL
326845	2003 UU_{118}	—	October 5, 2003	Kitt Peak	Spacewatch	·	650 m	MPC · JPL
326846	2003 UD_{130}	—	October 18, 2003	Palomar	NEAT	·	1.3 km	MPC · JPL
326847	2003 UO_{136}	—	October 21, 2003	Socorro	LINEAR	·	740 m	MPC · JPL
326848	2003 UZ_{145}	—	October 18, 2003	Anderson Mesa	LONEOS	·	4.3 km	MPC · JPL
326849	2003 UC_{156}	—	October 20, 2003	Kitt Peak	Spacewatch	·	700 m	MPC · JPL
326850	2003 UY_{156}	—	October 20, 2003	Socorro	LINEAR	·	4.0 km	MPC · JPL
326851	2003 UT_{168}	—	October 22, 2003	Socorro	LINEAR	·	900 m	MPC · JPL
326852	2003 UL_{175}	—	October 21, 2003	Anderson Mesa	LONEOS	·	5.2 km	MPC · JPL
326853	2003 UQ_{184}	—	October 21, 2003	Palomar	NEAT	·	3.4 km	MPC · JPL
326854	2003 UY_{185}	—	October 22, 2003	Kitt Peak	Spacewatch	V	820 m	MPC · JPL
326855	2003 UL_{187}	—	October 22, 2003	Socorro	LINEAR	·	1.4 km	MPC · JPL
326856	2003 UQ_{187}	—	October 22, 2003	Socorro	LINEAR	·	4.7 km	MPC · JPL
326857	2003 UT_{192}	—	October 24, 2003	Socorro	LINEAR	PHO	2.9 km	MPC · JPL
326858	2003 UM_{201}	—	October 21, 2003	Socorro	LINEAR	·	4.0 km	MPC · JPL
326859	2003 UN_{202}	—	October 21, 2003	Socorro	LINEAR	·	1.1 km	MPC · JPL
326860	2003 UC_{206}	—	October 22, 2003	Socorro	LINEAR	·	940 m	MPC · JPL
326861	2003 UK_{207}	—	October 22, 2003	Kitt Peak	Spacewatch	·	1.0 km	MPC · JPL
326862	2003 UN_{212}	—	October 23, 2003	Kitt Peak	Spacewatch	·	820 m	MPC · JPL
326863	2003 UT_{220}	—	October 22, 2003	Kitt Peak	Spacewatch	·	3.3 km	MPC · JPL
326864	2003 UR_{226}	—	October 22, 2003	Kitt Peak	Spacewatch	·	2.8 km	MPC · JPL
326865	2003 UC_{237}	—	October 23, 2003	Kitt Peak	Spacewatch	EOS	3.1 km	MPC · JPL
326866	2003 UW_{240}	—	October 24, 2003	Kitt Peak	Spacewatch	·	790 m	MPC · JPL
326867	2003 UO_{243}	—	October 24, 2003	Socorro	LINEAR	·	970 m	MPC · JPL
326868	2003 UB_{248}	—	October 25, 2003	Kitt Peak	Spacewatch	HYG	2.8 km	MPC · JPL
326869	2003 UF_{250}	—	October 25, 2003	Socorro	LINEAR	·	820 m	MPC · JPL
326870	2003 UY_{270}	—	October 17, 2003	Palomar	NEAT	·	3.5 km	MPC · JPL
326871	2003 UA_{294}	—	October 21, 2003	Anderson Mesa	LONEOS	TIR	4.2 km	MPC · JPL
326872	2003 UA_{295}	—	October 2, 2003	Kitt Peak	Spacewatch	·	790 m	MPC · JPL
326873	2003 UN_{303}	—	October 17, 2003	Kitt Peak	Spacewatch	·	3.8 km	MPC · JPL
326874	2003 UP_{314}	—	October 24, 2003	Kitt Peak	M. W. Buie	·	5.8 km	MPC · JPL
326875	2003 UB_{317}	—	October 18, 2003	Apache Point	SDSS	·	750 m	MPC · JPL
326876	2003 UE_{317}	—	October 18, 2003	Apache Point	SDSS	·	780 m	MPC · JPL
326877	2003 UG_{339}	—	October 18, 2003	Kitt Peak	Spacewatch	NYS	830 m	MPC · JPL
326878	2003 UB_{350}	—	October 19, 2003	Apache Point	SDSS	·	2.7 km	MPC · JPL
326879	2003 UU_{355}	—	September 28, 2003	Kitt Peak	Spacewatch	EOS	2.3 km	MPC · JPL
326880	2003 UM_{364}	—	October 20, 2003	Kitt Peak	Spacewatch	·	3.8 km	MPC · JPL
326881	2003 UD_{372}	—	October 22, 2003	Apache Point	SDSS	·	3.2 km	MPC · JPL
326882	2003 UP_{374}	—	October 22, 2003	Apache Point	SDSS	·	3.1 km	MPC · JPL
326883	2003 UY_{399}	—	October 22, 2003	Kitt Peak	Spacewatch	·	2.0 km	MPC · JPL
326884	2003 UA_{415}	—	October 22, 2003	Apache Point	SDSS	·	3.2 km	MPC · JPL
326885	2003 VB_{10}	—	November 2, 2003	Socorro	LINEAR	·	3.9 km	MPC · JPL
326886	2003 WD	—	November 16, 2003	Kitt Peak	Spacewatch	·	2.8 km	MPC · JPL
326887	2003 WJ_{7}	—	November 18, 2003	Kitt Peak	Spacewatch	·	770 m	MPC · JPL
326888	2003 WX_{13}	—	October 29, 2003	Socorro	LINEAR	·	1.0 km	MPC · JPL
326889	2003 WN_{14}	—	November 16, 2003	Kitt Peak	Spacewatch	VER	3.5 km	MPC · JPL
326890	2003 WS_{17}	—	November 18, 2003	Palomar	NEAT	·	4.2 km	MPC · JPL
326891	2003 WS_{18}	—	November 19, 2003	Socorro	LINEAR	·	4.0 km	MPC · JPL
326892	2003 WM_{23}	—	November 18, 2003	Kitt Peak	Spacewatch	·	5.3 km	MPC · JPL
326893	2003 WN_{23}	—	November 18, 2003	Kitt Peak	Spacewatch	·	4.3 km	MPC · JPL
326894	2003 WV_{25}	—	November 20, 2003	Palomar	NEAT	PHO	1.5 km	MPC · JPL
326895	2003 WQ_{28}	—	November 16, 2003	Kitt Peak	Spacewatch	·	910 m	MPC · JPL
326896	2003 WN_{45}	—	November 19, 2003	Palomar	NEAT	·	1.6 km	MPC · JPL
326897	2003 WX_{48}	—	November 19, 2003	Kitt Peak	Spacewatch	·	880 m	MPC · JPL
326898	2003 WL_{56}	—	November 20, 2003	Socorro	LINEAR	·	4.0 km	MPC · JPL
326899	2003 WS_{73}	—	November 20, 2003	Socorro	LINEAR	·	1.1 km	MPC · JPL
326900	2003 WL_{75}	—	November 18, 2003	Kitt Peak	Spacewatch	·	1.0 km	MPC · JPL

== 326901–327000 ==
back to top

Designation			Discovery			Properties		Ref
Permanent	Provisional	Named after	Date	Site	Discoverer(s)	Category	Diam.	Ref
326901	2003 WF_{80}	—	November 20, 2003	Socorro	LINEAR	TIR	3.3 km	MPC · JPL
326902	2003 WY_{88}	—	November 16, 2003	Catalina	CSS	·	880 m	MPC · JPL
326903	2003 WD_{94}	—	November 19, 2003	Anderson Mesa	LONEOS	·	4.1 km	MPC · JPL
326904	2003 WS_{120}	—	November 20, 2003	Socorro	LINEAR	·	2.6 km	MPC · JPL
326905	2003 WT_{124}	—	November 20, 2003	Socorro	LINEAR	ERI	1.9 km	MPC · JPL
326906	2003 WC_{143}	—	November 23, 2003	Socorro	LINEAR	·	4.4 km	MPC · JPL
326907	2003 WS_{150}	—	November 24, 2003	Anderson Mesa	LONEOS	·	950 m	MPC · JPL
326908	2003 WH_{161}	—	November 30, 2003	Kitt Peak	Spacewatch	·	3.1 km	MPC · JPL
326909	2003 WU_{161}	—	November 30, 2003	Socorro	LINEAR	·	1.3 km	MPC · JPL
326910	2003 WF_{171}	—	November 23, 2003	Anderson Mesa	LONEOS	·	3.9 km	MPC · JPL
326911	2003 WG_{172}	—	November 30, 2003	Socorro	LINEAR	·	1.4 km	MPC · JPL
326912	2003 WM_{172}	—	November 30, 2003	Socorro	LINEAR	·	1.1 km	MPC · JPL
326913	2003 XZ_{2}	—	December 1, 2003	Socorro	LINEAR	·	1.3 km	MPC · JPL
326914	2003 XE_{18}	—	December 14, 2003	Palomar	NEAT	·	980 m	MPC · JPL
326915	2003 XU_{39}	—	December 28, 2003	Kitt Peak	Spacewatch	TIR	4.2 km	MPC · JPL
326916	2003 YM_{17}	—	December 19, 2003	Socorro	LINEAR	PHO	1.2 km	MPC · JPL
326917	2003 YR_{29}	—	December 17, 2003	Kitt Peak	Spacewatch	·	5.3 km	MPC · JPL
326918	2003 YC_{36}	—	December 19, 2003	Haleakala	NEAT	·	1.7 km	MPC · JPL
326919	2003 YX_{61}	—	December 19, 2003	Socorro	LINEAR	·	1.3 km	MPC · JPL
326920	2003 YE_{71}	—	December 18, 2003	Socorro	LINEAR	·	910 m	MPC · JPL
326921	2003 YW_{103}	—	December 21, 2003	Socorro	LINEAR	·	5.0 km	MPC · JPL
326922	2003 YK_{143}	—	December 28, 2003	Socorro	LINEAR	·	1.2 km	MPC · JPL
326923	2003 YY_{145}	—	December 28, 2003	Socorro	LINEAR	·	1.4 km	MPC · JPL
326924	2003 YW_{161}	—	December 17, 2003	Kitt Peak	Spacewatch	·	3.7 km	MPC · JPL
326925	2004 BN_{18}	—	January 17, 2004	Palomar	NEAT	H	720 m	MPC · JPL
326926	2004 BM_{28}	—	January 18, 2004	Palomar	NEAT	NYS	1.4 km	MPC · JPL
326927	2004 BP_{28}	—	January 18, 2004	Palomar	NEAT	V	850 m	MPC · JPL
326928	2004 BE_{41}	—	January 21, 2004	Socorro	LINEAR	·	1.3 km	MPC · JPL
326929	2004 BZ_{43}	—	January 22, 2004	Socorro	LINEAR	PHO	1.2 km	MPC · JPL
326930	2004 BU_{67}	—	January 24, 2004	Socorro	LINEAR	·	1.4 km	MPC · JPL
326931	2004 BG_{76}	—	January 24, 2004	Socorro	LINEAR	·	1.8 km	MPC · JPL
326932	2004 BG_{80}	—	January 24, 2004	Socorro	LINEAR	·	1.4 km	MPC · JPL
326933	2004 BT_{136}	—	January 19, 2004	Kitt Peak	Spacewatch	MAS	840 m	MPC · JPL
326934	2004 CB_{7}	—	February 10, 2004	Palomar	NEAT	·	1.4 km	MPC · JPL
326935	2004 CH_{11}	—	February 11, 2004	Palomar	NEAT	PHO	1.0 km	MPC · JPL
326936	2004 CT_{11}	—	February 11, 2004	Palomar	NEAT	NYS	1.1 km	MPC · JPL
326937	2004 CC_{45}	—	February 13, 2004	Kitt Peak	Spacewatch	·	1.1 km	MPC · JPL
326938	2004 CR_{56}	—	January 23, 2004	Socorro	LINEAR	·	1.5 km	MPC · JPL
326939	2004 CL_{57}	—	February 11, 2004	Kitt Peak	Spacewatch	·	1.4 km	MPC · JPL
326940	2004 CN_{76}	—	February 11, 2004	Kitt Peak	Spacewatch	·	2.0 km	MPC · JPL
326941	2004 CS_{81}	—	February 12, 2004	Kitt Peak	Spacewatch	·	1.3 km	MPC · JPL
326942	2004 CR_{121}	—	February 12, 2004	Kitt Peak	Spacewatch	MAS	770 m	MPC · JPL
326943	2004 DY_{15}	—	February 17, 2004	Kitt Peak	Spacewatch	NYS	1.3 km	MPC · JPL
326944	2004 DP_{19}	—	February 17, 2004	Catalina	CSS	·	1.4 km	MPC · JPL
326945	2004 DF_{39}	—	February 22, 2004	Kitt Peak	Spacewatch	MAS	900 m	MPC · JPL
326946	2004 EN_{20}	—	March 15, 2004	Palomar	NEAT	AMO	720 m	MPC · JPL
326947	2004 EO_{46}	—	March 15, 2004	Kitt Peak	Spacewatch	·	1.5 km	MPC · JPL
326948	2004 FT_{1}	—	March 17, 2004	Socorro	LINEAR	H	700 m	MPC · JPL
326949	2004 FR_{2}	—	March 17, 2004	Socorro	LINEAR	H	480 m	MPC · JPL
326950	2004 FZ_{7}	—	March 16, 2004	Kitt Peak	Spacewatch	NYS	940 m	MPC · JPL
326951	2004 FV_{15}	—	March 23, 2004	Socorro	LINEAR	H	520 m	MPC · JPL
326952	2004 FC_{61}	—	March 19, 2004	Socorro	LINEAR	·	1.1 km	MPC · JPL
326953	2004 FN_{67}	—	March 20, 2004	Socorro	LINEAR	·	2.2 km	MPC · JPL
326954	2004 FG_{131}	—	March 22, 2004	Anderson Mesa	LONEOS	·	1.7 km	MPC · JPL
326955	2004 GU_{11}	—	April 12, 2004	Socorro	LINEAR	H	690 m	MPC · JPL
326956	2004 GY_{11}	—	April 12, 2004	Socorro	LINEAR	H	760 m	MPC · JPL
326957	2004 GF_{34}	—	April 12, 2004	Siding Spring	SSS	·	1.4 km	MPC · JPL
326958	2004 GH_{47}	—	April 12, 2004	Kitt Peak	Spacewatch	(5)	1.0 km	MPC · JPL
326959	2004 HP_{1}	—	April 19, 2004	Socorro	LINEAR	H	830 m	MPC · JPL
326960	2004 HL_{20}	—	April 22, 2004	Desert Eagle	W. K. Y. Yeung	·	1.6 km	MPC · JPL
326961	2004 HJ_{71}	—	April 25, 2004	Kitt Peak	Spacewatch	·	1.3 km	MPC · JPL
326962	2004 JC_{2}	—	May 11, 2004	Socorro	LINEAR	H	660 m	MPC · JPL
326963	2004 JC_{7}	—	May 13, 2004	Socorro	LINEAR	·	2.4 km	MPC · JPL
326964	2004 JR_{14}	—	May 9, 2004	Kitt Peak	Spacewatch	·	1.4 km	MPC · JPL
326965	2004 JL_{18}	—	May 13, 2004	Kitt Peak	Spacewatch	·	1.6 km	MPC · JPL
326966	2004 JB_{20}	—	May 14, 2004	Socorro	LINEAR	·	1.7 km	MPC · JPL
326967	2004 JE_{20}	—	May 14, 2004	Catalina	CSS	·	1.3 km	MPC · JPL
326968	2004 JX_{21}	—	May 9, 2004	Kitt Peak	Spacewatch	·	1.1 km	MPC · JPL
326969	2004 JG_{44}	—	May 12, 2004	Anderson Mesa	LONEOS	·	1.6 km	MPC · JPL
326970	2004 JQ_{45}	—	May 15, 2004	Socorro	LINEAR	·	2.0 km	MPC · JPL
326971	2004 KB_{12}	—	May 21, 2004	Kitt Peak	Spacewatch	·	1.5 km	MPC · JPL
326972	2004 LV_{4}	—	June 12, 2004	Socorro	LINEAR	EUN	1.4 km	MPC · JPL
326973	2004 LR_{7}	—	June 11, 2004	Socorro	LINEAR	·	2.3 km	MPC · JPL
326974	2004 LO_{31}	—	June 14, 2004	Socorro	LINEAR	·	1.5 km	MPC · JPL
326975	2004 MJ	—	June 17, 2004	Wrightwood	Mayes, D.	·	2.7 km	MPC · JPL
326976	2004 MY_{6}	—	June 20, 2004	Bergisch Gladbach	W. Bickel	·	1.4 km	MPC · JPL
326977	2004 NU_{1}	—	July 9, 2004	Socorro	LINEAR	·	3.1 km	MPC · JPL
326978	2004 NT_{2}	—	July 10, 2004	Palomar	NEAT	EUN	1.7 km	MPC · JPL
326979	2004 NH_{16}	—	July 11, 2004	Socorro	LINEAR	·	2.2 km	MPC · JPL
326980	2004 NA_{20}	—	July 14, 2004	Socorro	LINEAR	ADE	2.8 km	MPC · JPL
326981	2004 OH_{8}	—	July 16, 2004	Socorro	LINEAR	·	2.1 km	MPC · JPL
326982	2004 OV_{14}	—	July 29, 2004	Siding Spring	SSS	·	2.4 km	MPC · JPL
326983	2004 PJ_{4}	—	August 5, 2004	Palomar	NEAT	JUN	1.2 km	MPC · JPL
326984	2004 PM_{5}	—	August 6, 2004	Palomar	NEAT	·	1.7 km	MPC · JPL
326985	2004 PV_{20}	—	August 6, 2004	Palomar	NEAT	EUN	1.3 km	MPC · JPL
326986	2004 PM_{38}	—	August 9, 2004	Socorro	LINEAR	·	5.3 km	MPC · JPL
326987	2004 PB_{60}	—	August 9, 2004	Socorro	LINEAR	·	2.0 km	MPC · JPL
326988	2004 PN_{77}	—	August 9, 2004	Socorro	LINEAR	EUN	1.8 km	MPC · JPL
326989	2004 PG_{78}	—	August 9, 2004	Socorro	LINEAR	·	2.0 km	MPC · JPL
326990	2004 PB_{79}	—	August 9, 2004	Socorro	LINEAR	·	3.1 km	MPC · JPL
326991	2004 PC_{80}	—	August 9, 2004	Socorro	LINEAR	·	2.0 km	MPC · JPL
326992	2004 PZ_{86}	—	August 11, 2004	Socorro	LINEAR	·	2.3 km	MPC · JPL
326993	2004 PG_{88}	—	August 11, 2004	Socorro	LINEAR	·	1.8 km	MPC · JPL
326994	2004 PQ_{91}	—	August 12, 2004	Socorro	LINEAR	·	2.5 km	MPC · JPL
326995	2004 PN_{115}	—	August 13, 2004	Palomar	NEAT	·	1.4 km	MPC · JPL
326996	2004 QJ_{4}	—	August 20, 2004	Siding Spring	SSS	EUN	1.7 km	MPC · JPL
326997	2004 QE_{18}	—	August 20, 2004	Kitt Peak	Spacewatch	·	2.4 km	MPC · JPL
326998	2004 QG_{27}	—	August 20, 2004	Catalina	CSS	·	2.7 km	MPC · JPL
326999	2004 QG_{28}	—	August 25, 2004	Kitt Peak	Spacewatch	·	2.1 km	MPC · JPL
327000	2004 RZ_{5}	—	September 4, 2004	Palomar	NEAT	·	2.4 km	MPC · JPL

back to top

== See also ==
- Meanings of minor-planet names: 326001–327000
