= Meanings of minor-planet names: 327001–328000 =

As minor planet discoveries are confirmed, they are given a permanent number by the IAU's Minor Planet Center (MPC), and the discoverers can then submit names for them, following the IAU's naming conventions. The list below concerns those minor planets in the specified number-range that have received names, and explains the meanings of those names.

Official naming citations of newly named small Solar System bodies are approved and published in a bulletin by IAU's Working Group for Small Bodies Nomenclature (WGSBN). Before May 2021, citations were published in MPC's Minor Planet Circulars for many decades. Recent citations can also be found on the JPL Small-Body Database (SBDB). Until his death in 2016, German astronomer Lutz D. Schmadel compiled these citations into the Dictionary of Minor Planet Names (DMP) and regularly updated the collection.

Based on Paul Herget's The Names of the Minor Planets, Schmadel also researched the unclear origin of numerous asteroids, most of which had been named prior to World War II. This article incorporates text from this source, which is in the public domain: SBDB New namings may only be added to this list below after official publication as the preannouncement of names is condemned. The WGSBN publishes a comprehensive guideline for the naming rules of non-cometary small Solar System bodies.

== 327001–327100 ==
Named minor planet	Provisional	This minor planet was named for...	Ref · Catalog
327030 Alanmaclure	2004 RR_{289}	Alan McClure (1929–2005), an American amateur astronomer, comet photographer and member at the Stony Ridge Observatory, California †	JPL · 327030
327082 Tournesol	2004 VT_{65}	Professor Calculus (French: Professor Tournesol), a fictional character in The Adventures of Tintin, the series of graphic albums written and illustrated by Belgian artist Hergé.	JPL · 327082

== 327101–327200 ==
back to top

Named minor planet	Provisional	This minor planet was named for...	Ref · Catalog
There are no named minor planets in this number range

== 327201–327300 ==
back to top

Named minor planet	Provisional	This minor planet was named for...	Ref · Catalog
There are no named minor planets in this number range

== 327301–327400 ==
back to top

Named minor planet	Provisional	This minor planet was named for...	Ref · Catalog
There are no named minor planets in this number range

== 327401–327500 ==
back to top

Named minor planet	Provisional	This minor planet was named for...	Ref · Catalog
327421 Yanamandra	2005 WP	Padma Yanmandra-Fisher (1957-2026) was a senior research scientist for the Space Science Institute (formerly at JPL), studying light interactions in various media (planetary atmospheres, rings, comets and the solar corona), while expanding scientific outreach and professional-citizen collaboration in astronomy.	JPL · 327421

== 327501–327600 ==
back to top

Named minor planet	Provisional	This minor planet was named for...	Ref · Catalog
327512 Bíró	2006 BR_{26}	László Bíró (1899–1985), Hungarian inventor of the easy-to-use writing implement generally known as the "biro" in Britain and the ballpoint pen in the U.S.	JPL · 327512

== 327601–327700 ==
back to top

Named minor planet	Provisional	This minor planet was named for...	Ref · Catalog
327632 Ferrarini	2006 OJ_{10}	Valérie Ferrarini (born 1968) is an amateur astronomer from the south of France. She is a member of the Astronomes Amateurs Aixois de l'Observatoire de Vauvenargues.	IAU · 327632
327695 Yokoono	2006 RF_{107}	Yoko Ono (born 1933) is an iconic figure in avant-garde and performance art in the late 20th and early 21st century. Her work encompasses both visual and musical arts, the latter including notable collaborations with her husband John Lennon. Ono has also advocated tirelessly for peace for over fifty years.	JPL · 327695

== 327701–327800 ==
back to top

Named minor planet	Provisional	This minor planet was named for...	Ref · Catalog
There are no named minor planets in this number range

== 327801–327900 ==
back to top

Named minor planet	Provisional	This minor planet was named for...	Ref · Catalog
There are no named minor planets in this number range

== 327901–328000 ==
back to top

Named minor planet	Provisional	This minor planet was named for...	Ref · Catalog
327943 Xavierbarcons	2007 EQ_{26}	Xavier Barcons (born 1959) is a Spanish physicist and Director General of the European Southern Observatory. Barcons' research has been focused on astronomy in the X-ray wavelengths for the study of distant quasar spectra.	JPL · 327943
327977 Skarga	2007 FO_{34}	Piotr Skarga (1536–1612), Polish Jesuit preacher and hagiographer.	JPL · 327977
327982 Balducci	2007 GE_{2}	Genoveffa Balducci (born 1954) is an Italian surgeon and Director of Emergency Surgery at the Sant'Andrea hospital in Rome. A general surgery lecturer at "La Sapienza" University of Rome, he is the author of about 200 scientific publications.	JPL · 327982
327989 Howieglatter	2007 GC_{32}	Charles Howard ("Howie") Glatter (1946–2017), was a very talented New York-based entrepreneur who developed and manufactured some of astronomy's most sought after state-of-the art collimation tools. He was also an inventor of several other innovative astronomy products that advanced amateur astronomy.	IAU · 327989

back to top

Preceded by 326,001–327,000	Meanings of minor-planet names List of minor planets: 327,001–328,000	Succeeded by 328,001–329,000
