= 326732 Nice =

Binary near-Earth asteroid

Discovery
- Discovered by: LONEOS
- Discovery site: Anderson Mesa
- Discovery date: 25 April 2003

Designations
- Pronunciation: /ˈniːs/ NEESS
- Named after: Nice, France
- Alternative designations: 2003 HB_{6}
- Minor planet category: Amor; NEO

Orbital characteristics
- Epoch 21 November 2025 (JD 2461000.5)
- Uncertainty parameter 0
- Aphelion: 4.2605 AU
- Perihelion: 1.1658 AU
- Semi-major axis: 2.7132 AU
- Eccentricity: 0.5703
- Orbital period (sidereal): 4.4692 yr (1632.37 d)
- Mean anomaly: 348.1798°
- Inclination: 6.6184°
- Longitude of ascending node: 161.6112°
- Argument of perihelion: 145.8055°
- Known satellites: 1
- Earth MOID: 0.1637 AU
- T_{Jupiter}: 3.096

Physical characteristics
- Dimensions: 1.95 ± 0.63 kilometres (1.21 ± 0.39 mi)
- Sidereal rotation period: 3.463 h
- Spectral type: X or D L Color indices: g–r = 0.531±0.015 r–i = 0.190±0.018 i–z = 0.089±0.025
- Absolute magnitude (H): 17.66 (JPL)

326732 Nice (/ˈniːs/ NEESS; provisional designation 2003 HB_{6}) is a binary near-Earth asteroid. It was discovered on 25 April 2003 by the Lowell Observatory Near-Earth Object Search (LONEOS) project and named after the French city of Nice on 24 February 2025. Classified as an Amor asteroid, it has a diameter of nearly 2 kilometres (1.2 mi) and rotates once every 3.5 hours. It has one known moon; the unnamed satellite's discovery was announced on 18 September 2021.

== Discovery and naming ==
Nice was discovered by the Lowell Observatory Near-Earth-Object Search (LONEOS) project at Anderson Mesa on 25 April 2003. It was given the provisional designation 2003 HB_{6}, and its discovery was announced in a Minor Planet Electronic Circular the next day. Once its orbit was sufficiently determined, it was numbered (326732) by the Minor Planet Center on 6 May 2012.

On 24 February 2025, the asteroid was given the name Nice by the Working Group for Small Bodies Nomenclature (WGSBN). The asteroid was named in honour of the city of Nice, France, which was founded by Greek colonists in 350 BCE. The city was declared a UNESCO World Heritage Site in 2021, and it is home to the Côte d'Azur Observatory, whose planetary science team has been well-involved in asteroid research. The city is also the namesake for the Nice model, which proposes that the giant planets migrated to their current orbits from a more compact configuration early in the Solar System's history. The name was proposed by planetary scientist Patrick Michel, principal investigator of the ESA's Hera mission. This first European planetary defense mission aims to study the effects of NASA's Double Asteroid Redirection Test impact on Dimorphos, a moon of 65803 Didymos. Michel stated that his naming proposal aimed to bring recognition to Nice's contributions to Astronomy.

== Orbit ==
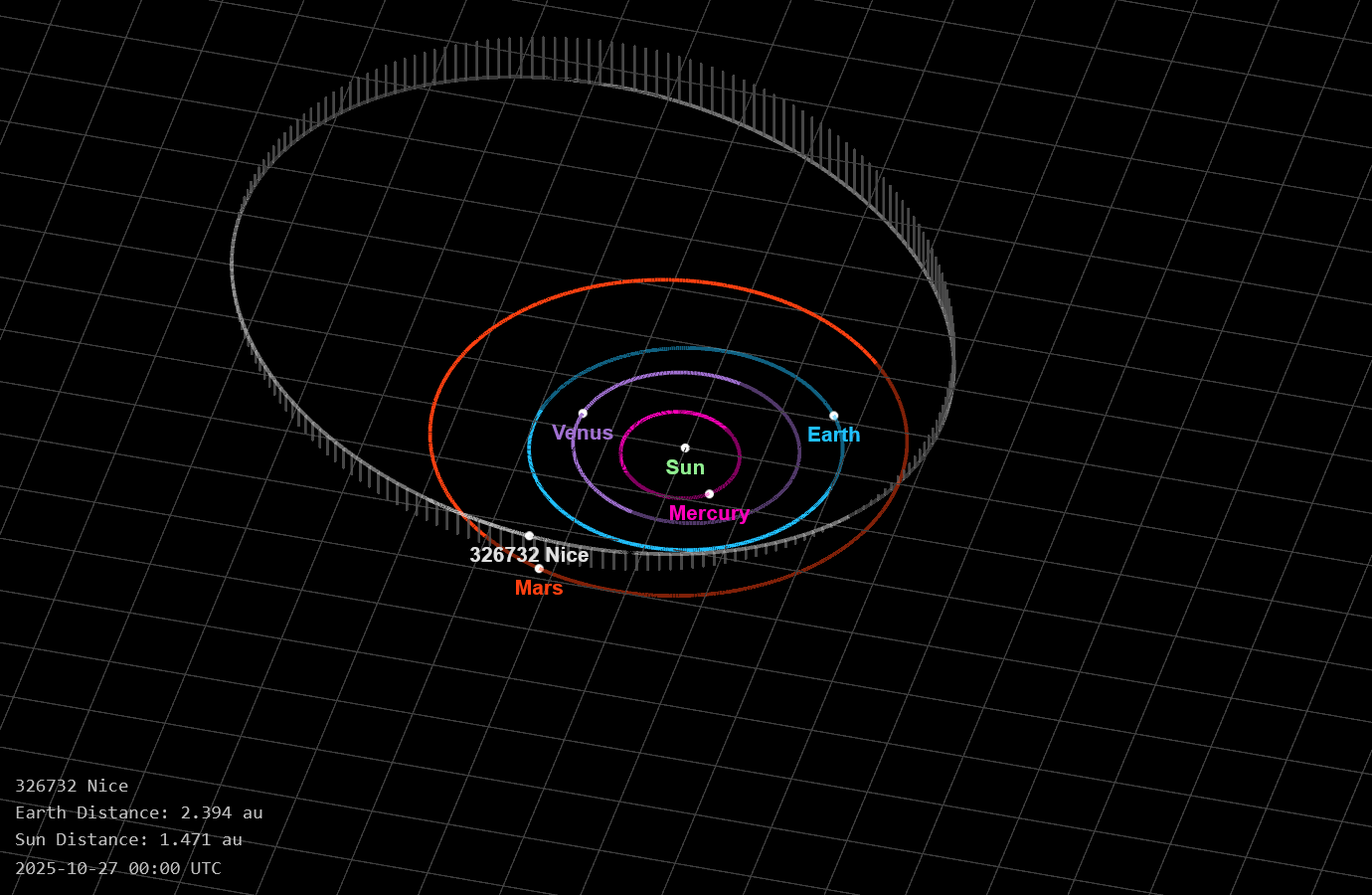
An orbital diagram of 326732 Nice, with the orbits of the inner planets and the ecliptic grid shown.

Nice orbits the Sun with a semi-major axis (a) of 2.71 astronomical units (AU), completing one orbit every 4.47 years. It has an orbital inclination of 6.62° with respect to the ecliptic plane. Due to its orbital eccentricity of 0.57, its distance to the Sun along its orbit varies from 4.26 AU at aphelion to 1.17 AU at perihelion. It is classified as a near-Earth asteroid (NEA), and it is a member of the Amor asteroids—NEAs whose orbits lie entirely outside Earth's (a > 1.0 AU) but have perihelia under 1.3 AU.

== Physical properties ==
Nice has a diameter of 1.95 ± 0.63 kilometres (1.21 ± 0.39 mi). It is either an X-type, D-type, or L-type asteroid. Spectrally, Nice closely resembles the Tagish Lake meteorite, and may be its source object.

Analysis of Nice's lightcurve, or fluctuations in its observed brightness as it rotates, indicates that it has a rotation period of 3.463 hours. Its rotation period lies close to the spin barrier, which lies at 2.2 hours. The spin barrier is the critical rotation period below which a strengthless rubble pile asteroid with a bulk density of 2.2 g/cm^{3} would structurally fail due to the centrifugal force.

== Satellite ==
Discovery
- Discovered by: Petr Pravec et al.
- Discovery site: Ondrejov Observatory; European Southern Observatory
- Discovery date: 18 September 2021

Orbital characteristics
- Orbital period (sidereal): 22.903 h

Physical characteristics
- Sidereal rotation period: 22.903 h (synchronous)

Nice has one known satellite, making it a binary asteroid. It was discovered by a team of astronomers led by Petr Pravec in photometric observations taken at Ondrejov Observatory and the European Southern Observatory between 10 August and 15 September 2021. Its discovery was announced through the Central Bureau Electronic Telegrams on 18 September of that year. The satellite currently has no name or official designation.

Mutual eclipses indicate that the satellite is 0.23±0.02 times the size of Nice. The satellite's lightcurve suggests that it has a slightly elongated shape, with an a/b ratio of 1.4±0.2. It orbits with a period of 22.903 hours and is synchronously tidally locked to Nice.
