= Meanings of minor-planet names: 328001–329000 =

As minor planet discoveries are confirmed, they are given a permanent number by the IAU's Minor Planet Center (MPC), and the discoverers can then submit names for them, following the IAU's naming conventions. The list below concerns those minor planets in the specified number-range that have received names, and explains the meanings of those names.

Official naming citations of newly named small Solar System bodies are approved and published in a bulletin by IAU's Working Group for Small Bodies Nomenclature (WGSBN). Before May 2021, citations were published in MPC's Minor Planet Circulars for many decades. Recent citations can also be found on the JPL Small-Body Database (SBDB). Until his death in 2016, German astronomer Lutz D. Schmadel compiled these citations into the Dictionary of Minor Planet Names (DMP) and regularly updated the collection.

Based on Paul Herget's The Names of the Minor Planets, Schmadel also researched the unclear origin of numerous asteroids, most of which had been named prior to World War II. This article incorporates text from this source, which is in the public domain: SBDB New namings may only be added to this list below after official publication as the preannouncement of names is condemned. The WGSBN publishes a comprehensive guideline for the naming rules of non-cometary small Solar System bodies.

== 328001–328100 ==
Named minor planet	Provisional	This minor planet was named for...	Ref · Catalog
There are no named minor planets in this number range

== 328101–328200 ==
back to top

Named minor planet	Provisional	This minor planet was named for...	Ref · Catalog
There are no named minor planets in this number range

== 328201–328300 ==
back to top

Named minor planet	Provisional	This minor planet was named for...	Ref · Catalog
There are no named minor planets in this number range

== 328301–328400 ==
back to top

Named minor planet	Provisional	This minor planet was named for...	Ref · Catalog
328305 Jackmcdevitt	2008 HY	Jack McDevitt (born 1935), an American science fiction author.	JPL · 328305

== 328401–328500 ==
back to top

Named minor planet	Provisional	This minor planet was named for...	Ref · Catalog
328432 Thomasposch	2008 TP_{9}	Thomas Posch (1974–2019) was an Austrian astronomer of the University of Vienna, who contributed significantly to the study of circumstellar dust properties, natural philosophy, and the history of astronomy. His work for the protection of the night sky and the promotion of astronomy made him well known in Austria and abroad.	JPL · 328432
328477 Eckstein	2009 HG_{36}	Hartmut Eckstein (born 1954), an experienced astrophotographer at the Starkenburg Observatory.	JPL · 328477

== 328501–328600 ==
back to top

Named minor planet	Provisional	This minor planet was named for...	Ref · Catalog
328509 Kostyahrubych	2009 QC_{10}	Kostyantyn Volodymyrovych Hrubych, known by his friendly nickname Kostya, a Ukrainian journalist and TV presenter.	IAU · 328509
328563 Mosplanetarium	2009 SZ_{1}	Moscow Planetarium, the oldest planetarium in Europe, which celebrated its 85th anniversary in 2014.	JPL · 328563

== 328601–328700 ==
back to top

Named minor planet	Provisional	This minor planet was named for...	Ref · Catalog
328677 Stofan	2009 SG_{309}	Ellen Stofan (b. 1961) is the Under Secretary for Science and Research at the Smithsonian Institution. Stofan has researched the geology of Venus, Mars, and Saturn's moon Titan. She is the former Director of the National Air and Space Museum and Chief Scientist of NASA.	IAU · 328677

== 328701–328800 ==
back to top

Named minor planet	Provisional	This minor planet was named for...	Ref · Catalog
There are no named minor planets in this number range

== 328801–328900 ==
back to top

Named minor planet	Provisional	This minor planet was named for...	Ref · Catalog
328870 Danabarbato	2009 XN_{7}	Dana Barbato (born 1967) is a NYC science teacher and known local nature photographer. Her efforts have attracted many young folks into the sciences. She has traveled worldwide, and her nature images have appeared in the local newspaper, calendars and Fodor's Safari Guidei.	IAU · 328870

== 328901–329000 ==
back to top

Named minor planet	Provisional	This minor planet was named for...	Ref · Catalog
There are no named minor planets in this number range

back to top

Preceded by 327,001–328,000	Meanings of minor-planet names List of minor planets: 328,001–329,000	Succeeded by 329,001–330,000
