= List of minor planets: 328001–329000 =

The following is a partial list of minor planets, running from minor-planet number 328001 through 329000, inclusive. The primary data for this and other partial lists is based on JPL's "Small-Body Orbital Elements" and data available from the Minor Planet Center. Critical list information is also provided by the MPC, unless otherwise specified from Lowell Observatory. A detailed description of the table's columns and additional sources are given on the main page including a complete list of every page in this series, and a statistical break-up on the dynamical classification of minor planets.

Also see the summary list of all named bodies in numerical and alphabetical order, and the corresponding naming citations for the number range of this particular list. New namings may only be added to this list after official publication, as the preannouncement of names is condemned by the Working Group for Small Bodies Nomenclature of the International Astronomical Union.

Near-Earth obj.	MBA (inner)	MBA (outer)	Centaur
Mars-crosser	MBA (middle)	Jupiter trojan	Trans-Neptunian obj.
Unclassified

== 328001–328100 ==
Designation			Discovery			Properties		Ref
Permanent	Provisional	Named after	Date	Site	Discoverer(s)	Category	Diam.	Ref
328001	2007 HQ_{2}	—	April 16, 2007	Mount Lemmon	Mount Lemmon Survey	·	2.9 km	MPC · JPL
328002	2007 HQ_{4}	—	April 19, 2007	Great Shefford	Birtwhistle, P.	EOS	2.8 km	MPC · JPL
328003	2007 HY_{18}	—	November 3, 2003	Apache Point	SDSS	H	630 m	MPC · JPL
328004	2007 HU_{27}	—	April 18, 2007	Kitt Peak	Spacewatch	·	1.6 km	MPC · JPL
328005	2007 HP_{34}	—	April 19, 2007	Kitt Peak	Spacewatch	·	2.1 km	MPC · JPL
328006	2007 HO_{41}	—	April 20, 2007	Kitt Peak	Spacewatch	·	2.0 km	MPC · JPL
328007	2007 HQ_{41}	—	April 20, 2007	Kitt Peak	Spacewatch	·	2.6 km	MPC · JPL
328008	2007 HX_{45}	—	April 18, 2007	Kitt Peak	Spacewatch	·	6.6 km	MPC · JPL
328009	2007 HK_{66}	—	April 22, 2007	Mount Lemmon	Mount Lemmon Survey	·	3.1 km	MPC · JPL
328010	2007 HP_{66}	—	April 22, 2007	Mount Lemmon	Mount Lemmon Survey	EOS	2.1 km	MPC · JPL
328011	2007 HZ_{66}	—	April 22, 2007	Mount Lemmon	Mount Lemmon Survey	·	1.7 km	MPC · JPL
328012	2007 HO_{68}	—	April 23, 2007	Kitt Peak	Spacewatch	·	2.0 km	MPC · JPL
328013	2007 HC_{70}	—	April 24, 2007	Mount Lemmon	Mount Lemmon Survey	H	630 m	MPC · JPL
328014	2007 HD_{89}	—	April 22, 2007	Kitt Peak	Spacewatch	EOS	2.3 km	MPC · JPL
328015	2007 HO_{96}	—	April 18, 2007	Kitt Peak	Spacewatch	EOS	2.2 km	MPC · JPL
328016	2007 HK_{97}	—	April 25, 2007	Mount Lemmon	Mount Lemmon Survey	·	2.2 km	MPC · JPL
328017	2007 JO	—	May 7, 2007	Mount Lemmon	Mount Lemmon Survey	·	3.0 km	MPC · JPL
328018	2007 JM_{8}	—	May 9, 2007	Mount Lemmon	Mount Lemmon Survey	EOS	2.0 km	MPC · JPL
328019	2007 JP_{8}	—	May 9, 2007	Mount Lemmon	Mount Lemmon Survey	·	2.6 km	MPC · JPL
328020	2007 JH_{10}	—	May 7, 2007	Kitt Peak	Spacewatch	·	3.3 km	MPC · JPL
328021	2007 JK_{10}	—	January 7, 2006	Mount Lemmon	Mount Lemmon Survey	·	1.7 km	MPC · JPL
328022	2007 JJ_{12}	—	May 7, 2007	Kitt Peak	Spacewatch	·	2.8 km	MPC · JPL
328023	2007 JZ_{15}	—	May 10, 2007	Mount Lemmon	Mount Lemmon Survey	·	2.4 km	MPC · JPL
328024	2007 JS_{18}	—	May 9, 2007	Kitt Peak	Spacewatch	·	2.6 km	MPC · JPL
328025	2007 JM_{23}	—	May 7, 2007	Mount Lemmon	Mount Lemmon Survey	(5651)	3.2 km	MPC · JPL
328026	2007 JB_{27}	—	May 9, 2007	Kitt Peak	Spacewatch	·	3.3 km	MPC · JPL
328027	2007 KU_{2}	—	May 21, 2007	Tiki	S. F. Hönig, Teamo, N.	·	3.6 km	MPC · JPL
328028	2007 KU_{5}	—	May 24, 2007	Mount Lemmon	Mount Lemmon Survey	·	1.9 km	MPC · JPL
328029	2007 KM_{6}	—	May 25, 2007	Mount Lemmon	Mount Lemmon Survey	·	2.2 km	MPC · JPL
328030	2007 KV_{7}	—	May 17, 2007	Catalina	CSS	H	740 m	MPC · JPL
328031	2007 KX_{8}	—	January 13, 2005	Kitt Peak	Spacewatch	·	4.2 km	MPC · JPL
328032	2007 LP_{1}	—	June 7, 2007	Kitt Peak	Spacewatch	·	2.5 km	MPC · JPL
328033	2007 LQ_{1}	—	June 7, 2007	Kitt Peak	Spacewatch	·	3.8 km	MPC · JPL
328034	2007 LX_{3}	—	June 8, 2007	Kitt Peak	Spacewatch	·	3.8 km	MPC · JPL
328035	2007 LS_{4}	—	June 8, 2007	Kitt Peak	Spacewatch	·	4.6 km	MPC · JPL
328036	2007 LK_{6}	—	June 8, 2007	Kitt Peak	Spacewatch	·	2.9 km	MPC · JPL
328037	2007 LX_{7}	—	June 8, 2007	Kitt Peak	Spacewatch	·	2.9 km	MPC · JPL
328038	2007 LP_{9}	—	October 14, 1998	Kitt Peak	Spacewatch	EOS	2.0 km	MPC · JPL
328039	2007 LD_{16}	—	June 10, 2007	Kitt Peak	Spacewatch	·	2.4 km	MPC · JPL
328040	2007 LJ_{16}	—	June 10, 2007	Kitt Peak	Spacewatch	·	4.5 km	MPC · JPL
328041	2007 LN_{17}	—	June 10, 2007	Kitt Peak	Spacewatch	·	2.9 km	MPC · JPL
328042	2007 LK_{18}	—	June 13, 2007	Anderson Mesa	LONEOS	T_{j} (2.97)	6.6 km	MPC · JPL
328043	2007 LW_{32}	—	June 15, 2007	Catalina	CSS	·	4.2 km	MPC · JPL
328044	2007 MS_{6}	—	June 17, 2007	Kitt Peak	Spacewatch	·	2.4 km	MPC · JPL
328045	2007 MC_{7}	—	June 18, 2007	Kitt Peak	Spacewatch	VER	4.0 km	MPC · JPL
328046	2007 MA_{8}	—	June 18, 2007	Kitt Peak	Spacewatch	·	2.7 km	MPC · JPL
328047	2007 MZ_{13}	—	June 20, 2007	Kitt Peak	Spacewatch	·	2.3 km	MPC · JPL
328048	2007 MF_{14}	—	June 20, 2007	Kitt Peak	Spacewatch	·	1.9 km	MPC · JPL
328049	2007 NA_{6}	—	July 10, 2007	Siding Spring	SSS	TIR	3.5 km	MPC · JPL
328050	2007 NS_{6}	—	July 10, 2007	Siding Spring	SSS	TIR	3.3 km	MPC · JPL
328051	2007 OW	—	July 17, 2007	La Sagra	OAM	·	4.5 km	MPC · JPL
328052	2007 RJ_{132}	—	September 13, 2007	Anderson Mesa	LONEOS	H	730 m	MPC · JPL
328053	2007 TE_{25}	—	October 11, 2007	Catalina	CSS	H	600 m	MPC · JPL
328054	2007 TS_{145}	—	October 6, 2007	Socorro	LINEAR	3:2	6.5 km	MPC · JPL
328055	2007 TB_{227}	—	October 8, 2007	Kitt Peak	Spacewatch	·	620 m	MPC · JPL
328056	2007 TS_{318}	—	October 12, 2007	Kitt Peak	Spacewatch	·	780 m	MPC · JPL
328057	2007 TJ_{332}	—	October 11, 2007	Kitt Peak	Spacewatch	·	1.0 km	MPC · JPL
328058	2007 TS_{442}	—	October 9, 2007	Catalina	CSS	·	2.4 km	MPC · JPL
328059	2007 UB_{6}	—	October 19, 2007	Socorro	LINEAR	AMO	420 m	MPC · JPL
328060	2007 US_{46}	—	October 20, 2007	Catalina	CSS	·	1.1 km	MPC · JPL
328061	2007 UL_{48}	—	October 20, 2007	Mount Lemmon	Mount Lemmon Survey	·	640 m	MPC · JPL
328062	2007 UZ_{97}	—	October 30, 2007	Mount Lemmon	Mount Lemmon Survey	·	550 m	MPC · JPL
328063	2007 UH_{137}	—	May 12, 2004	Catalina	CSS	H	750 m	MPC · JPL
328064	2007 VR_{56}	—	November 1, 2007	Kitt Peak	Spacewatch	·	710 m	MPC · JPL
328065	2007 VJ_{83}	—	November 4, 2007	Mount Lemmon	Mount Lemmon Survey	·	910 m	MPC · JPL
328066	2007 VQ_{124}	—	November 5, 2007	Mount Lemmon	Mount Lemmon Survey	·	780 m	MPC · JPL
328067	2007 VK_{202}	—	November 6, 2007	Mount Lemmon	Mount Lemmon Survey	·	740 m	MPC · JPL
328068	2007 VQ_{208}	—	November 11, 2007	Mount Lemmon	Mount Lemmon Survey	·	700 m	MPC · JPL
328069	2007 VF_{245}	—	November 14, 2007	Bisei SG Center	BATTeRS	·	730 m	MPC · JPL
328070	2007 VD_{310}	—	November 6, 2007	Mount Lemmon	Mount Lemmon Survey	fast	1.3 km	MPC · JPL
328071	2007 VM_{330}	—	November 3, 2007	Mount Lemmon	Mount Lemmon Survey	·	920 m	MPC · JPL
328072	2007 WM	—	November 16, 2007	Tiki	Teamo, N.	·	790 m	MPC · JPL
328073	2007 WE_{8}	—	November 18, 2007	Socorro	LINEAR	·	770 m	MPC · JPL
328074	2007 WO_{62}	—	November 18, 2007	Mount Lemmon	Mount Lemmon Survey	·	1.2 km	MPC · JPL
328075	2007 XK	—	March 17, 2005	Mount Lemmon	Mount Lemmon Survey	(1338) (FLO)	790 m	MPC · JPL
328076	2007 XR_{28}	—	December 6, 2007	Kitt Peak	Spacewatch	·	880 m	MPC · JPL
328077	2007 XK_{31}	—	December 15, 2007	Kitt Peak	Spacewatch	·	690 m	MPC · JPL
328078	2007 XR_{31}	—	December 15, 2007	Catalina	CSS	·	790 m	MPC · JPL
328079	2007 XU_{40}	—	December 14, 2007	Socorro	LINEAR	·	740 m	MPC · JPL
328080	2007 XG_{48}	—	December 15, 2007	Kitt Peak	Spacewatch	·	1.0 km	MPC · JPL
328081	2007 XH_{56}	—	February 2, 2005	Kitt Peak	Spacewatch	·	640 m	MPC · JPL
328082	2007 XL_{57}	—	December 4, 2007	Socorro	LINEAR	·	980 m	MPC · JPL
328083	2007 XH_{58}	—	August 16, 2006	Siding Spring	SSS	·	900 m	MPC · JPL
328084	2007 YN_{26}	—	December 18, 2007	Mount Lemmon	Mount Lemmon Survey	·	980 m	MPC · JPL
328085	2007 YA_{31}	—	December 15, 2007	Kitt Peak	Spacewatch	·	860 m	MPC · JPL
328086	2007 YB_{44}	—	December 30, 2007	Mount Lemmon	Mount Lemmon Survey	·	1.0 km	MPC · JPL
328087	2007 YP_{44}	—	November 11, 2007	Mount Lemmon	Mount Lemmon Survey	NYS	890 m	MPC · JPL
328088	2007 YS_{49}	—	December 28, 2007	Kitt Peak	Spacewatch	·	960 m	MPC · JPL
328089	2007 YE_{63}	—	December 31, 2007	Mount Lemmon	Mount Lemmon Survey	·	1.0 km	MPC · JPL
328090	2007 YG_{63}	—	December 31, 2007	Mount Lemmon	Mount Lemmon Survey	CLA	1.6 km	MPC · JPL
328091	2007 YR_{63}	—	December 31, 2007	Kitt Peak	Spacewatch	·	900 m	MPC · JPL
328092	2007 YC_{64}	—	December 30, 2007	Kitt Peak	Spacewatch	·	940 m	MPC · JPL
328093	2007 YH_{64}	—	December 30, 2007	Kitt Peak	Spacewatch	·	1.1 km	MPC · JPL
328094	2007 YA_{68}	—	December 30, 2007	Kitt Peak	Spacewatch	·	750 m	MPC · JPL
328095	2007 YJ_{72}	—	December 18, 2007	Mount Lemmon	Mount Lemmon Survey	·	940 m	MPC · JPL
328096	2008 AR	—	January 1, 2008	Kitt Peak	Spacewatch	ERI	1.6 km	MPC · JPL
328097	2008 AD_{14}	—	January 10, 2008	Mount Lemmon	Mount Lemmon Survey	·	890 m	MPC · JPL
328098	2008 AJ_{16}	—	January 10, 2008	Mount Lemmon	Mount Lemmon Survey	·	920 m	MPC · JPL
328099	2008 AW_{17}	—	January 10, 2008	Kitt Peak	Spacewatch	·	900 m	MPC · JPL
328100	2008 AJ_{20}	—	January 10, 2008	Mount Lemmon	Mount Lemmon Survey	·	1.2 km	MPC · JPL

== 328101–328200 ==
back to top

Designation			Discovery			Properties		Ref
Permanent	Provisional	Named after	Date	Site	Discoverer(s)	Category	Diam.	Ref
328101	2008 AK_{22}	—	January 10, 2008	Mount Lemmon	Mount Lemmon Survey	NYS	1.1 km	MPC · JPL
328102	2008 AZ_{22}	—	December 30, 2007	Mount Lemmon	Mount Lemmon Survey	·	960 m	MPC · JPL
328103	2008 AO_{23}	—	January 10, 2008	Mount Lemmon	Mount Lemmon Survey	·	1.2 km	MPC · JPL
328104	2008 AG_{25}	—	January 10, 2008	Mount Lemmon	Mount Lemmon Survey	NYS	850 m	MPC · JPL
328105	2008 AZ_{31}	—	January 12, 2008	La Sagra	OAM	ERI	1.5 km	MPC · JPL
328106	2008 AA_{32}	—	January 12, 2008	La Sagra	OAM	·	1.1 km	MPC · JPL
328107	2008 AG_{37}	—	January 10, 2008	Kitt Peak	Spacewatch	NYS	810 m	MPC · JPL
328108	2008 AF_{42}	—	September 18, 2003	Kitt Peak	Spacewatch	·	910 m	MPC · JPL
328109	2008 AQ_{42}	—	December 30, 2007	Catalina	CSS	·	910 m	MPC · JPL
328110	2008 AS_{47}	—	January 11, 2008	Kitt Peak	Spacewatch	·	860 m	MPC · JPL
328111	2008 AW_{57}	—	January 11, 2008	Kitt Peak	Spacewatch	·	1.1 km	MPC · JPL
328112	2008 AL_{65}	—	January 11, 2008	Mount Lemmon	Mount Lemmon Survey	·	1.2 km	MPC · JPL
328113	2008 AS_{65}	—	January 11, 2008	Kitt Peak	Spacewatch	·	1.3 km	MPC · JPL
328114	2008 AO_{66}	—	January 11, 2008	Kitt Peak	Spacewatch	MAS	620 m	MPC · JPL
328115	2008 AK_{68}	—	January 11, 2008	Kitt Peak	Spacewatch	·	1.1 km	MPC · JPL
328116	2008 AR_{69}	—	December 4, 2007	Mount Lemmon	Mount Lemmon Survey	·	1.8 km	MPC · JPL
328117	2008 AB_{71}	—	January 12, 2008	Kitt Peak	Spacewatch	·	1.2 km	MPC · JPL
328118	2008 AY_{71}	—	January 13, 2008	Kitt Peak	Spacewatch	·	980 m	MPC · JPL
328119	2008 AK_{73}	—	December 30, 2007	Kitt Peak	Spacewatch	·	750 m	MPC · JPL
328120	2008 AU_{74}	—	January 11, 2008	Kitt Peak	Spacewatch	·	950 m	MPC · JPL
328121	2008 AY_{96}	—	January 14, 2008	Kitt Peak	Spacewatch	V	650 m	MPC · JPL
328122	2008 AL_{100}	—	January 14, 2008	Kitt Peak	Spacewatch	·	760 m	MPC · JPL
328123	2008 AB_{102}	—	January 12, 2008	Mount Lemmon	Mount Lemmon Survey	·	880 m	MPC · JPL
328124	2008 AA_{103}	—	January 15, 2008	Mount Lemmon	Mount Lemmon Survey	·	540 m	MPC · JPL
328125	2008 AN_{111}	—	January 15, 2008	Kitt Peak	Spacewatch	·	870 m	MPC · JPL
328126	2008 AX_{114}	—	January 11, 2008	Kitt Peak	Spacewatch	·	950 m	MPC · JPL
328127	2008 BV	—	January 16, 2008	Mount Lemmon	Mount Lemmon Survey	·	870 m	MPC · JPL
328128	2008 BN_{2}	—	January 19, 2008	Pla D'Arguines	R. Ferrando	·	890 m	MPC · JPL
328129	2008 BD_{7}	—	January 16, 2008	Kitt Peak	Spacewatch	·	1.2 km	MPC · JPL
328130	2008 BY_{8}	—	January 16, 2008	Kitt Peak	Spacewatch	ERI	1.8 km	MPC · JPL
328131	2008 BC_{10}	—	January 16, 2008	Kitt Peak	Spacewatch	·	1.0 km	MPC · JPL
328132	2008 BZ_{16}	—	January 13, 2008	Kitt Peak	Spacewatch	·	1.3 km	MPC · JPL
328133	2008 BD_{19}	—	January 30, 2008	Kitt Peak	Spacewatch	·	960 m	MPC · JPL
328134	2008 BG_{23}	—	January 31, 2008	Mount Lemmon	Mount Lemmon Survey	·	1.2 km	MPC · JPL
328135	2008 BL_{23}	—	January 31, 2008	Mount Lemmon	Mount Lemmon Survey	·	1.3 km	MPC · JPL
328136	2008 BC_{30}	—	January 30, 2008	Catalina	CSS	·	1.0 km	MPC · JPL
328137	2008 BY_{33}	—	June 18, 1998	Kitt Peak	Spacewatch	·	1.2 km	MPC · JPL
328138	2008 BX_{35}	—	January 30, 2008	Kitt Peak	Spacewatch	MAS	800 m	MPC · JPL
328139	2008 BG_{36}	—	January 30, 2008	Kitt Peak	Spacewatch	·	1.2 km	MPC · JPL
328140	2008 BS_{38}	—	January 31, 2008	Mount Lemmon	Mount Lemmon Survey	NYS	930 m	MPC · JPL
328141	2008 BH_{39}	—	January 30, 2008	Catalina	CSS	·	740 m	MPC · JPL
328142	2008 BS_{41}	—	January 30, 2008	Mount Lemmon	Mount Lemmon Survey	·	1.7 km	MPC · JPL
328143	2008 BB_{51}	—	January 30, 2008	Mount Lemmon	Mount Lemmon Survey	·	870 m	MPC · JPL
328144	2008 BM_{51}	—	January 16, 2008	Kitt Peak	Spacewatch	·	840 m	MPC · JPL
328145	2008 CE_{2}	—	February 1, 2008	La Sagra	OAM	·	1.3 km	MPC · JPL
328146	2008 CA_{10}	—	February 2, 2008	Mount Lemmon	Mount Lemmon Survey	·	1 km	MPC · JPL
328147	2008 CB_{25}	—	February 1, 2008	Kitt Peak	Spacewatch	·	1.6 km	MPC · JPL
328148	2008 CT_{29}	—	February 2, 2008	Kitt Peak	Spacewatch	·	990 m	MPC · JPL
328149	2008 CY_{42}	—	February 2, 2008	Kitt Peak	Spacewatch	·	1.1 km	MPC · JPL
328150	2008 CC_{43}	—	February 2, 2008	Kitt Peak	Spacewatch	NYS	1.0 km	MPC · JPL
328151	2008 CG_{54}	—	February 7, 2008	Catalina	CSS	·	1.1 km	MPC · JPL
328152	2008 CE_{65}	—	February 8, 2008	Mount Lemmon	Mount Lemmon Survey	·	1.2 km	MPC · JPL
328153	2008 CT_{86}	—	February 7, 2008	Mount Lemmon	Mount Lemmon Survey	NYS	1.2 km	MPC · JPL
328154	2008 CJ_{105}	—	February 6, 2008	Catalina	CSS	·	1.1 km	MPC · JPL
328155	2008 CW_{129}	—	February 8, 2008	Kitt Peak	Spacewatch	·	980 m	MPC · JPL
328156	2008 CB_{130}	—	February 8, 2008	Kitt Peak	Spacewatch	NYS	1.1 km	MPC · JPL
328157	2008 CB_{132}	—	September 18, 2006	Kitt Peak	Spacewatch	NYS	1.3 km	MPC · JPL
328158	2008 CA_{133}	—	February 8, 2008	Kitt Peak	Spacewatch	·	880 m	MPC · JPL
328159	2008 CD_{133}	—	February 8, 2008	Kitt Peak	Spacewatch	·	1.3 km	MPC · JPL
328160	2008 CE_{138}	—	February 8, 2008	Kitt Peak	Spacewatch	·	1.2 km	MPC · JPL
328161	2008 CL_{158}	—	February 9, 2008	Catalina	CSS	·	1.2 km	MPC · JPL
328162	2008 CH_{178}	—	February 6, 2008	Anderson Mesa	LONEOS	NYS	1.0 km	MPC · JPL
328163	2008 CP_{179}	—	February 6, 2008	Purple Mountain	PMO NEO Survey Program	·	1.2 km	MPC · JPL
328164	2008 CN_{192}	—	February 3, 2008	Catalina	CSS	·	1.5 km	MPC · JPL
328165	2008 CH_{194}	—	February 10, 2008	Mount Lemmon	Mount Lemmon Survey	·	1.2 km	MPC · JPL
328166	2008 CN_{196}	—	February 2, 2008	Kitt Peak	Spacewatch	·	1.2 km	MPC · JPL
328167	2008 CV_{197}	—	February 10, 2008	Mount Lemmon	Mount Lemmon Survey	·	1.1 km	MPC · JPL
328168	2008 CY_{200}	—	February 10, 2008	Kitt Peak	Spacewatch	·	1.2 km	MPC · JPL
328169	2008 CC_{201}	—	February 12, 2008	Kitt Peak	Spacewatch	·	1.4 km	MPC · JPL
328170	2008 CL_{210}	—	February 2, 2008	Kitt Peak	Spacewatch	·	1.0 km	MPC · JPL
328171	2008 CE_{215}	—	September 30, 2006	Mount Lemmon	Mount Lemmon Survey	·	1.2 km	MPC · JPL
328172	2008 CJ_{215}	—	January 1, 2008	Mount Lemmon	Mount Lemmon Survey	·	1.2 km	MPC · JPL
328173	2008 CM_{215}	—	February 13, 2008	Socorro	LINEAR	V	900 m	MPC · JPL
328174	2008 DP	—	February 24, 2008	Gaisberg	Gierlinger, R.	·	940 m	MPC · JPL
328175	2008 DN_{1}	—	February 24, 2008	Kitt Peak	Spacewatch	MAS	670 m	MPC · JPL
328176	2008 DU_{3}	—	February 24, 2008	Mount Lemmon	Mount Lemmon Survey	NYS	1.4 km	MPC · JPL
328177	2008 DH_{15}	—	February 26, 2008	Mount Lemmon	Mount Lemmon Survey	·	1.2 km	MPC · JPL
328178	2008 DZ_{23}	—	February 26, 2008	Mount Lemmon	Mount Lemmon Survey	·	1.2 km	MPC · JPL
328179	2008 DS_{27}	—	February 24, 2008	Mount Lemmon	Mount Lemmon Survey	·	980 m	MPC · JPL
328180	2008 DB_{33}	—	February 27, 2008	Kitt Peak	Spacewatch	NYS	1.3 km	MPC · JPL
328181	2008 DF_{36}	—	February 27, 2008	Mount Lemmon	Mount Lemmon Survey	PHO	990 m	MPC · JPL
328182	2008 DL_{36}	—	February 27, 2008	Mount Lemmon	Mount Lemmon Survey	MAS	680 m	MPC · JPL
328183	2008 DN_{36}	—	April 18, 1993	Kitt Peak	Spacewatch	·	970 m	MPC · JPL
328184	2008 DB_{37}	—	February 27, 2008	Catalina	CSS	ADE	2.6 km	MPC · JPL
328185	2008 DX_{40}	—	February 27, 2008	Lulin	LUSS	·	1.6 km	MPC · JPL
328186	2008 DK_{55}	—	February 26, 2008	Kitt Peak	Spacewatch	·	1.0 km	MPC · JPL
328187	2008 DK_{59}	—	February 27, 2008	Mount Lemmon	Mount Lemmon Survey	NYS	1.2 km	MPC · JPL
328188	2008 DY_{70}	—	February 28, 2008	Catalina	CSS	PHO	1.0 km	MPC · JPL
328189	2008 DD_{72}	—	February 26, 2008	Mount Lemmon	Mount Lemmon Survey	MAS	800 m	MPC · JPL
328190	2008 DP_{73}	—	February 27, 2008	Mount Lemmon	Mount Lemmon Survey	·	1.2 km	MPC · JPL
328191	2008 DF_{81}	—	February 27, 2008	Kitt Peak	Spacewatch	NYS	1.2 km	MPC · JPL
328192	2008 DO_{88}	—	February 24, 2008	Kitt Peak	Spacewatch	V	610 m	MPC · JPL
328193	2008 EF_{6}	—	March 2, 2008	Mount Lemmon	Mount Lemmon Survey	·	1.4 km	MPC · JPL
328194	2008 ER_{6}	—	March 2, 2008	Marly	P. Kocher	·	1.3 km	MPC · JPL
328195	2008 EH_{16}	—	March 1, 2008	Kitt Peak	Spacewatch	NYS	1.2 km	MPC · JPL
328196	2008 EQ_{16}	—	March 1, 2008	Kitt Peak	Spacewatch	·	1.2 km	MPC · JPL
328197	2008 EU_{24}	—	March 3, 2008	Mount Lemmon	Mount Lemmon Survey	·	1.8 km	MPC · JPL
328198	2008 EN_{25}	—	July 19, 2001	Palomar	NEAT	·	1.8 km	MPC · JPL
328199	2008 EX_{38}	—	March 4, 2008	Kitt Peak	Spacewatch	·	2.9 km	MPC · JPL
328200	2008 EW_{47}	—	March 5, 2008	Kitt Peak	Spacewatch	·	1.4 km	MPC · JPL

== 328201–328300 ==
back to top

Designation			Discovery			Properties		Ref
Permanent	Provisional	Named after	Date	Site	Discoverer(s)	Category	Diam.	Ref
328201	2008 EL_{48}	—	March 5, 2008	Kitt Peak	Spacewatch	KON	2.6 km	MPC · JPL
328202	2008 EA_{50}	—	March 6, 2008	Mount Lemmon	Mount Lemmon Survey	·	1.2 km	MPC · JPL
328203	2008 EQ_{54}	—	March 6, 2008	Kitt Peak	Spacewatch	V	840 m	MPC · JPL
328204	2008 EC_{55}	—	March 6, 2008	Kitt Peak	Spacewatch	·	1.3 km	MPC · JPL
328205	2008 EE_{56}	—	March 7, 2008	Mount Lemmon	Mount Lemmon Survey	·	940 m	MPC · JPL
328206	2008 EJ_{69}	—	March 10, 2008	Bisei SG Center	BATTeRS	·	1.7 km	MPC · JPL
328207	2008 EU_{69}	—	March 9, 2008	Needville	J. Dellinger, Eastman, M.	·	1.7 km	MPC · JPL
328208	2008 EZ_{79}	—	March 9, 2008	Kitt Peak	Spacewatch	MAS	760 m	MPC · JPL
328209	2008 EY_{81}	—	March 4, 2008	Socorro	LINEAR	·	1.4 km	MPC · JPL
328210	2008 EL_{89}	—	March 8, 2008	Socorro	LINEAR	·	1.5 km	MPC · JPL
328211	2008 EO_{96}	—	March 7, 2008	Mount Lemmon	Mount Lemmon Survey	·	990 m	MPC · JPL
328212	2008 EB_{109}	—	March 7, 2008	Mount Lemmon	Mount Lemmon Survey	NYS	970 m	MPC · JPL
328213	2008 EF_{111}	—	March 8, 2008	Kitt Peak	Spacewatch	·	1.6 km	MPC · JPL
328214	2008 EC_{116}	—	March 8, 2008	Mount Lemmon	Mount Lemmon Survey	·	1.1 km	MPC · JPL
328215	2008 EJ_{122}	—	March 9, 2008	Kitt Peak	Spacewatch	·	1.2 km	MPC · JPL
328216	2008 ED_{129}	—	March 11, 2008	Kitt Peak	Spacewatch	PHO	870 m	MPC · JPL
328217	2008 EQ_{131}	—	March 11, 2008	Kitt Peak	Spacewatch	·	1.3 km	MPC · JPL
328218	2008 ET_{139}	—	March 11, 2008	Kitt Peak	Spacewatch	·	1.1 km	MPC · JPL
328219	2008 EC_{148}	—	March 1, 2008	Kitt Peak	Spacewatch	·	1.7 km	MPC · JPL
328220	2008 EK_{151}	—	March 4, 2008	Mount Lemmon	Mount Lemmon Survey	·	1.4 km	MPC · JPL
328221	2008 ES_{155}	—	March 7, 2008	Mount Lemmon	Mount Lemmon Survey	·	2.1 km	MPC · JPL
328222	2008 FZ_{3}	—	March 25, 2008	Kitt Peak	Spacewatch	NYS	1.4 km	MPC · JPL
328223	2008 FC_{7}	—	October 1, 2005	Kitt Peak	Spacewatch	·	1.8 km	MPC · JPL
328224	2008 FY_{10}	—	March 26, 2008	Kitt Peak	Spacewatch	NYS	1.2 km	MPC · JPL
328225	2008 FM_{11}	—	March 26, 2008	Mount Lemmon	Mount Lemmon Survey	MAS	770 m	MPC · JPL
328226	2008 FU_{15}	—	March 26, 2008	Kitt Peak	Spacewatch	·	1.3 km	MPC · JPL
328227	2008 FY_{27}	—	March 27, 2008	Kitt Peak	Spacewatch	·	1.7 km	MPC · JPL
328228	2008 FA_{34}	—	March 28, 2008	Mount Lemmon	Mount Lemmon Survey	·	1.3 km	MPC · JPL
328229	2008 FL_{38}	—	March 10, 2008	Kitt Peak	Spacewatch	·	1.9 km	MPC · JPL
328230	2008 FR_{41}	—	March 28, 2008	Mount Lemmon	Mount Lemmon Survey	·	1.5 km	MPC · JPL
328231	2008 FP_{46}	—	March 28, 2008	Mount Lemmon	Mount Lemmon Survey	·	1.3 km	MPC · JPL
328232	2008 FB_{53}	—	March 28, 2008	Kitt Peak	Spacewatch	·	1.3 km	MPC · JPL
328233	2008 FB_{55}	—	March 28, 2008	Mount Lemmon	Mount Lemmon Survey	·	1.0 km	MPC · JPL
328234	2008 FX_{55}	—	March 28, 2008	Mount Lemmon	Mount Lemmon Survey	·	1.7 km	MPC · JPL
328235	2008 FH_{58}	—	March 28, 2008	Mount Lemmon	Mount Lemmon Survey	HNS	1.4 km	MPC · JPL
328236	2008 FD_{61}	—	March 29, 2008	Mount Lemmon	Mount Lemmon Survey	EUN	2.0 km	MPC · JPL
328237	2008 FG_{62}	—	March 27, 2008	Kitt Peak	Spacewatch	·	1.4 km	MPC · JPL
328238	2008 FC_{63}	—	March 27, 2008	Kitt Peak	Spacewatch	·	1.7 km	MPC · JPL
328239	2008 FU_{64}	—	March 28, 2008	Kitt Peak	Spacewatch	·	1.1 km	MPC · JPL
328240	2008 FH_{66}	—	March 28, 2008	Kitt Peak	Spacewatch	(5)	1.5 km	MPC · JPL
328241	2008 FZ_{66}	—	March 28, 2008	Kitt Peak	Spacewatch	·	1.2 km	MPC · JPL
328242	2008 FK_{67}	—	March 28, 2008	Mount Lemmon	Mount Lemmon Survey	·	2.5 km	MPC · JPL
328243	2008 FU_{75}	—	March 29, 2008	Kitt Peak	Spacewatch	·	1.9 km	MPC · JPL
328244	2008 FW_{76}	—	March 27, 2008	Kitt Peak	Spacewatch	PHO	930 m	MPC · JPL
328245	2008 FF_{84}	—	March 28, 2008	Mount Lemmon	Mount Lemmon Survey	·	1.2 km	MPC · JPL
328246	2008 FE_{90}	—	March 29, 2008	Mount Lemmon	Mount Lemmon Survey	·	1.2 km	MPC · JPL
328247	2008 FM_{100}	—	March 30, 2008	Kitt Peak	Spacewatch	slow	2.6 km	MPC · JPL
328248	2008 FR_{103}	—	March 30, 2008	Kitt Peak	Spacewatch	·	1.4 km	MPC · JPL
328249	2008 FL_{105}	—	March 31, 2008	Kitt Peak	Spacewatch	·	1.1 km	MPC · JPL
328250	2008 FB_{107}	—	March 31, 2008	Kitt Peak	Spacewatch	·	1.3 km	MPC · JPL
328251	2008 FO_{107}	—	March 31, 2008	Kitt Peak	Spacewatch	·	1.1 km	MPC · JPL
328252	2008 FT_{107}	—	March 31, 2008	Kitt Peak	Spacewatch	MAR	1.1 km	MPC · JPL
328253	2008 FX_{111}	—	March 31, 2008	Mount Lemmon	Mount Lemmon Survey	·	1.3 km	MPC · JPL
328254	2008 FM_{112}	—	March 31, 2008	Kitt Peak	Spacewatch	V	790 m	MPC · JPL
328255	2008 FO_{126}	—	March 29, 2008	Kitt Peak	Spacewatch	·	3.1 km	MPC · JPL
328256	2008 FP_{126}	—	March 29, 2008	Catalina	CSS	V	870 m	MPC · JPL
328257	2008 FB_{128}	—	March 28, 2008	Kitt Peak	Spacewatch	·	1.6 km	MPC · JPL
328258	2008 FN_{133}	—	March 27, 2008	Mount Lemmon	Mount Lemmon Survey	·	1.2 km	MPC · JPL
328259	2008 FV_{136}	—	March 29, 2008	Kitt Peak	Spacewatch	·	1.7 km	MPC · JPL
328260	2008 GQ_{5}	—	April 1, 2008	Kitt Peak	Spacewatch	·	1.1 km	MPC · JPL
328261	2008 GV_{6}	—	March 28, 2008	Mount Lemmon	Mount Lemmon Survey	·	2.0 km	MPC · JPL
328262	2008 GX_{13}	—	April 3, 2008	Mount Lemmon	Mount Lemmon Survey	MAS	640 m	MPC · JPL
328263	2008 GX_{18}	—	April 4, 2008	Mount Lemmon	Mount Lemmon Survey	·	1.8 km	MPC · JPL
328264	2008 GG_{20}	—	April 8, 2008	Desert Eagle	W. K. Y. Yeung	·	1.2 km	MPC · JPL
328265	2008 GE_{23}	—	April 1, 2008	Mount Lemmon	Mount Lemmon Survey	·	1.6 km	MPC · JPL
328266	2008 GQ_{25}	—	April 1, 2008	Mount Lemmon	Mount Lemmon Survey	·	1.0 km	MPC · JPL
328267	2008 GD_{31}	—	April 3, 2008	Mount Lemmon	Mount Lemmon Survey	·	2.0 km	MPC · JPL
328268	2008 GP_{37}	—	April 3, 2008	Kitt Peak	Spacewatch	(5)	1.5 km	MPC · JPL
328269	2008 GC_{39}	—	April 3, 2008	Kitt Peak	Spacewatch	·	1.6 km	MPC · JPL
328270	2008 GJ_{44}	—	April 4, 2008	Mount Lemmon	Mount Lemmon Survey	MAR	1.2 km	MPC · JPL
328271	2008 GY_{47}	—	April 4, 2008	Kitt Peak	Spacewatch	·	1.8 km	MPC · JPL
328272	2008 GP_{48}	—	April 5, 2008	Kitt Peak	Spacewatch	NYS	1.3 km	MPC · JPL
328273	2008 GT_{48}	—	September 19, 1998	Kitt Peak	Spacewatch	V	730 m	MPC · JPL
328274	2008 GZ_{51}	—	April 5, 2008	Mount Lemmon	Mount Lemmon Survey	·	1.4 km	MPC · JPL
328275	2008 GJ_{54}	—	April 5, 2008	Kitt Peak	Spacewatch	·	1.4 km	MPC · JPL
328276	2008 GN_{63}	—	April 5, 2008	Kitt Peak	Spacewatch	·	1.3 km	MPC · JPL
328277	2008 GY_{63}	—	April 5, 2008	Mount Lemmon	Mount Lemmon Survey	·	1.2 km	MPC · JPL
328278	2008 GV_{68}	—	April 6, 2008	Kitt Peak	Spacewatch	(194)	1.9 km	MPC · JPL
328279	2008 GA_{69}	—	April 6, 2008	Kitt Peak	Spacewatch	·	1.4 km	MPC · JPL
328280	2008 GS_{69}	—	April 6, 2008	Mount Lemmon	Mount Lemmon Survey	EUN	1.3 km	MPC · JPL
328281	2008 GP_{82}	—	April 8, 2008	Kitt Peak	Spacewatch	·	1.4 km	MPC · JPL
328282	2008 GC_{87}	—	April 10, 2008	Kitt Peak	Spacewatch	·	1.3 km	MPC · JPL
328283	2008 GJ_{91}	—	April 6, 2008	Mount Lemmon	Mount Lemmon Survey	·	1.2 km	MPC · JPL
328284	2008 GR_{98}	—	April 8, 2008	Kitt Peak	Spacewatch	·	1.7 km	MPC · JPL
328285	2008 GR_{101}	—	April 10, 2008	Kitt Peak	Spacewatch	·	1.1 km	MPC · JPL
328286	2008 GS_{102}	—	April 10, 2008	Kitt Peak	Spacewatch	(5)	1.7 km	MPC · JPL
328287	2008 GM_{109}	—	April 13, 2008	Mount Lemmon	Mount Lemmon Survey	·	2.6 km	MPC · JPL
328288	2008 GQ_{109}	—	April 13, 2008	Mount Lemmon	Mount Lemmon Survey	BRG	1.4 km	MPC · JPL
328289	2008 GK_{111}	—	April 6, 2008	Socorro	LINEAR	·	2.1 km	MPC · JPL
328290	2008 GY_{113}	—	April 9, 2008	Kitt Peak	Spacewatch	·	1.5 km	MPC · JPL
328291	2008 GV_{119}	—	April 11, 2008	Kitt Peak	Spacewatch	·	1.3 km	MPC · JPL
328292	2008 GN_{123}	—	April 13, 2008	Kitt Peak	Spacewatch	·	1.7 km	MPC · JPL
328293	2008 GZ_{128}	—	April 1, 2008	Kitt Peak	Spacewatch	·	1.1 km	MPC · JPL
328294	2008 GJ_{129}	—	April 3, 2008	Kitt Peak	Spacewatch	·	1.9 km	MPC · JPL
328295	2008 GP_{130}	—	April 6, 2008	Kitt Peak	Spacewatch	(5)	1.5 km	MPC · JPL
328296	2008 GJ_{132}	—	April 13, 2008	Mount Lemmon	Mount Lemmon Survey	·	1.6 km	MPC · JPL
328297	2008 GG_{133}	—	April 1, 2008	Kitt Peak	Spacewatch	·	1.2 km	MPC · JPL
328298	2008 GN_{136}	—	April 3, 2008	Kitt Peak	Spacewatch	·	1.2 km	MPC · JPL
328299	2008 GP_{137}	—	April 6, 2008	Mount Lemmon	Mount Lemmon Survey	HNS	1.0 km	MPC · JPL
328300	2008 GR_{137}	—	April 6, 2008	Mount Lemmon	Mount Lemmon Survey	·	1.3 km	MPC · JPL

== 328301–328400 ==
back to top

Designation			Discovery			Properties		Ref
Permanent	Provisional	Named after	Date	Site	Discoverer(s)	Category	Diam.	Ref
328301	2008 GR_{138}	—	April 6, 2008	Kitt Peak	Spacewatch	(5)	1.5 km	MPC · JPL
328302	2008 GU_{138}	—	April 5, 2008	Mount Lemmon	Mount Lemmon Survey	·	1.8 km	MPC · JPL
328303	2008 GN_{142}	—	April 4, 2008	Catalina	CSS	·	2.2 km	MPC · JPL
328304	2008 GQ_{144}	—	April 4, 2008	Mount Lemmon	Mount Lemmon Survey	·	1.7 km	MPC · JPL
328305 Jackmcdevitt	2008 HY	Jackmcdevitt	October 20, 2006	Kitt Peak	Deep Ecliptic Survey	·	1.5 km	MPC · JPL
328306	2008 HS_{10}	—	April 24, 2008	Kitt Peak	Spacewatch	·	1.2 km	MPC · JPL
328307	2008 HT_{17}	—	April 26, 2008	Kitt Peak	Spacewatch	·	2.9 km	MPC · JPL
328308	2008 HO_{19}	—	April 26, 2008	Kitt Peak	Spacewatch	·	1.4 km	MPC · JPL
328309	2008 HT_{21}	—	April 26, 2008	Catalina	CSS	·	2.7 km	MPC · JPL
328310	2008 HZ_{21}	—	April 26, 2008	Mount Lemmon	Mount Lemmon Survey	BAR	1.4 km	MPC · JPL
328311	2008 HN_{32}	—	April 29, 2008	Mount Lemmon	Mount Lemmon Survey	·	1.4 km	MPC · JPL
328312	2008 HJ_{33}	—	April 25, 2008	Kitt Peak	Spacewatch	·	990 m	MPC · JPL
328313	2008 HU_{36}	—	April 30, 2008	Kitt Peak	Spacewatch	·	1.8 km	MPC · JPL
328314	2008 HH_{55}	—	April 29, 2008	Kitt Peak	Spacewatch	·	1.8 km	MPC · JPL
328315	2008 HJ_{55}	—	April 29, 2008	Kitt Peak	Spacewatch	·	1.5 km	MPC · JPL
328316	2008 HB_{57}	—	April 30, 2008	Kitt Peak	Spacewatch	·	2.0 km	MPC · JPL
328317	2008 HA_{59}	—	April 30, 2008	Mount Lemmon	Mount Lemmon Survey	·	1.2 km	MPC · JPL
328318	2008 HX_{60}	—	April 30, 2008	Kitt Peak	Spacewatch	MAR	1.2 km	MPC · JPL
328319	2008 JK_{7}	—	April 6, 2008	Kitt Peak	Spacewatch	·	1.6 km	MPC · JPL
328320	2008 JN_{7}	—	May 3, 2008	Mount Lemmon	Mount Lemmon Survey	·	1.5 km	MPC · JPL
328321	2008 JN_{10}	—	May 3, 2008	Mount Lemmon	Mount Lemmon Survey	·	930 m	MPC · JPL
328322	2008 JX_{13}	—	May 6, 2008	Mount Lemmon	Mount Lemmon Survey	·	1.7 km	MPC · JPL
328323	2008 JB_{15}	—	May 7, 2008	Desert Eagle	W. K. Y. Yeung	·	1.4 km	MPC · JPL
328324	2008 JR_{15}	—	May 2, 2008	Kitt Peak	Spacewatch	·	1.5 km	MPC · JPL
328325	2008 JW_{15}	—	May 3, 2008	Kitt Peak	Spacewatch	·	950 m	MPC · JPL
328326	2008 JK_{19}	—	May 7, 2008	Mount Lemmon	Mount Lemmon Survey	·	1.4 km	MPC · JPL
328327	2008 JY_{25}	—	May 8, 2008	Kitt Peak	Spacewatch	·	1.4 km	MPC · JPL
328328	2008 JJ_{26}	—	May 13, 2008	Mount Lemmon	Mount Lemmon Survey	BAR	1.4 km	MPC · JPL
328329	2008 JC_{28}	—	May 8, 2008	Kitt Peak	Spacewatch	·	2.0 km	MPC · JPL
328330	2008 JU_{28}	—	May 8, 2008	Kitt Peak	Spacewatch	·	1.6 km	MPC · JPL
328331	2008 JT_{30}	—	May 11, 2008	Kitt Peak	Spacewatch	·	2.5 km	MPC · JPL
328332	2008 JZ_{31}	—	May 5, 2008	Mount Lemmon	Mount Lemmon Survey	·	1.6 km	MPC · JPL
328333	2008 JG_{34}	—	May 14, 2008	Catalina	CSS	·	1.9 km	MPC · JPL
328334	2008 JO_{34}	—	May 15, 2008	Kitt Peak	Spacewatch	·	1.9 km	MPC · JPL
328335	2008 JU_{35}	—	May 1, 2008	Kitt Peak	Spacewatch	·	4.1 km	MPC · JPL
328336	2008 JZ_{35}	—	May 3, 2008	Kitt Peak	Spacewatch	·	1.3 km	MPC · JPL
328337	2008 JX_{36}	—	May 3, 2008	Kitt Peak	Spacewatch	·	1.7 km	MPC · JPL
328338	2008 JV_{39}	—	May 3, 2008	Kitt Peak	Spacewatch	·	1.4 km	MPC · JPL
328339	2008 KU_{1}	—	May 26, 2008	Kitt Peak	Spacewatch	·	1.3 km	MPC · JPL
328340	2008 KV_{1}	—	May 26, 2008	Kitt Peak	Spacewatch	WIT	1.2 km	MPC · JPL
328341	2008 KP_{2}	—	May 27, 2008	Kitt Peak	Spacewatch	·	2.1 km	MPC · JPL
328342	2008 KZ_{2}	—	May 26, 2008	Kitt Peak	Spacewatch	·	1.4 km	MPC · JPL
328343	2008 KH_{6}	—	April 30, 2008	Mount Lemmon	Mount Lemmon Survey	·	1.3 km	MPC · JPL
328344	2008 KP_{7}	—	May 27, 2008	Mount Lemmon	Mount Lemmon Survey	·	1.0 km	MPC · JPL
328345	2008 KW_{12}	—	May 27, 2008	Kitt Peak	Spacewatch	·	1.1 km	MPC · JPL
328346	2008 KX_{15}	—	May 27, 2008	Kitt Peak	Spacewatch	·	1.9 km	MPC · JPL
328347	2008 KJ_{23}	—	May 28, 2008	Kitt Peak	Spacewatch	·	1.5 km	MPC · JPL
328348	2008 KE_{31}	—	May 29, 2008	Kitt Peak	Spacewatch	·	2.5 km	MPC · JPL
328349	2008 KF_{41}	—	May 30, 2008	Kitt Peak	Spacewatch	MAR	780 m	MPC · JPL
328350	2008 LU_{2}	—	June 1, 2008	Kitt Peak	Spacewatch	MAR	1.2 km	MPC · JPL
328351	2008 LY_{2}	—	June 1, 2008	Kitt Peak	Spacewatch	·	1.8 km	MPC · JPL
328352	2008 LV_{7}	—	June 4, 2008	Kitt Peak	Spacewatch	JUN	1.3 km	MPC · JPL
328353	2008 LG_{8}	—	June 4, 2008	Kitt Peak	Spacewatch	BRG	2.2 km	MPC · JPL
328354	2008 LL_{15}	—	June 9, 2008	Kitt Peak	Spacewatch	·	2.5 km	MPC · JPL
328355	2008 LZ_{16}	—	June 7, 2008	Kitt Peak	Spacewatch	EUN	1.7 km	MPC · JPL
328356	2008 MT	—	June 27, 2008	La Sagra	OAM	JUN	1.7 km	MPC · JPL
328357	2008 NE_{2}	—	December 2, 2005	Mount Lemmon	Mount Lemmon Survey	·	2.3 km	MPC · JPL
328358	2008 OE_{3}	—	July 28, 2008	Črni Vrh	Skvarč, J.	·	3.0 km	MPC · JPL
328359	2008 OZ_{3}	—	July 26, 2008	Siding Spring	SSS	·	2.6 km	MPC · JPL
328360	2008 OL_{4}	—	July 28, 2008	Črni Vrh	Skvarč, J.	·	2.7 km	MPC · JPL
328361	2008 OX_{10}	—	July 29, 2008	Socorro	LINEAR	·	3.9 km	MPC · JPL
328362	2008 OY_{10}	—	July 29, 2008	Socorro	LINEAR	·	3.3 km	MPC · JPL
328363	2008 OX_{19}	—	July 29, 2008	Kitt Peak	Spacewatch	·	3.6 km	MPC · JPL
328364	2008 OH_{24}	—	July 30, 2008	Mount Lemmon	Mount Lemmon Survey	EOS	2.4 km	MPC · JPL
328365	2008 PN_{6}	—	August 5, 2008	Skylive	Tozzi, F.	·	3.0 km	MPC · JPL
328366	2008 PY_{21}	—	August 7, 2008	Kitt Peak	Spacewatch	EOS	2.6 km	MPC · JPL
328367	2008 QR_{7}	—	August 25, 2008	Hibiscus	S. F. Hönig, Teamo, N.	·	3.7 km	MPC · JPL
328368	2008 QT_{10}	—	August 26, 2008	La Sagra	OAM	·	3.3 km	MPC · JPL
328369	2008 QJ_{16}	—	August 28, 2008	Hibiscus	S. F. Hönig, Teamo, N.	·	3.4 km	MPC · JPL
328370	2008 QY_{17}	—	August 27, 2008	Vicques	M. Ory	·	3.4 km	MPC · JPL
328371	2008 QP_{18}	—	August 28, 2008	Dauban	Kugel, F.	·	4.4 km	MPC · JPL
328372	2008 QH_{19}	—	August 27, 2008	Kleť	Kleť	·	1.7 km	MPC · JPL
328373	2008 QG_{21}	—	August 26, 2008	Socorro	LINEAR	EOS	2.7 km	MPC · JPL
328374	2008 QG_{26}	—	July 29, 2008	Kitt Peak	Spacewatch	DOR	2.4 km	MPC · JPL
328375	2008 QR_{27}	—	August 30, 2008	La Sagra	OAM	·	3.4 km	MPC · JPL
328376	2008 QH_{28}	—	August 30, 2008	La Sagra	OAM	EMA	6.1 km	MPC · JPL
328377	2008 QH_{48}	—	August 30, 2008	Socorro	LINEAR	EUP	3.2 km	MPC · JPL
328378	2008 RD_{8}	—	September 3, 2008	Kitt Peak	Spacewatch	·	3.7 km	MPC · JPL
328379	2008 RO_{31}	—	September 2, 2008	Kitt Peak	Spacewatch	·	5.6 km	MPC · JPL
328380	2008 RP_{40}	—	September 2, 2008	Kitt Peak	Spacewatch	·	2.0 km	MPC · JPL
328381	2008 RK_{41}	—	September 2, 2008	Kitt Peak	Spacewatch	L4 · ERY	8.1 km	MPC · JPL
328382	2008 RT_{46}	—	September 2, 2008	Kitt Peak	Spacewatch	·	3.2 km	MPC · JPL
328383	2008 RR_{56}	—	September 3, 2008	Kitt Peak	Spacewatch	·	3.8 km	MPC · JPL
328384	2008 RA_{63}	—	September 4, 2008	Kitt Peak	Spacewatch	EMA	4.4 km	MPC · JPL
328385	2008 RL_{74}	—	September 6, 2008	Catalina	CSS	·	2.7 km	MPC · JPL
328386	2008 RE_{83}	—	September 4, 2008	Kitt Peak	Spacewatch	·	2.4 km	MPC · JPL
328387	2008 RC_{90}	—	September 5, 2008	Kitt Peak	Spacewatch	·	5.2 km	MPC · JPL
328388	2008 RD_{97}	—	September 7, 2008	Mount Lemmon	Mount Lemmon Survey	·	2.7 km	MPC · JPL
328389	2008 RK_{98}	—	September 7, 2008	Siding Spring	SSS	·	2.5 km	MPC · JPL
328390	2008 RP_{101}	—	September 2, 2008	Kitt Peak	Spacewatch	·	4.1 km	MPC · JPL
328391	2008 RT_{105}	—	September 6, 2008	Catalina	CSS	·	4.4 km	MPC · JPL
328392	2008 RF_{113}	—	September 5, 2008	Kitt Peak	Spacewatch	·	2.4 km	MPC · JPL
328393	2008 RY_{118}	—	September 10, 2008	Siding Spring	SSS	T_{j} (2.96)	5.6 km	MPC · JPL
328394	2008 RT_{124}	—	September 6, 2008	Mount Lemmon	Mount Lemmon Survey	·	2.6 km	MPC · JPL
328395	2008 RC_{129}	—	September 7, 2008	Catalina	CSS	·	7.1 km	MPC · JPL
328396	2008 RF_{132}	—	September 7, 2008	Catalina	CSS	·	3.2 km	MPC · JPL
328397	2008 RD_{139}	—	September 7, 2008	Socorro	LINEAR	·	5.6 km	MPC · JPL
328398	2008 RN_{143}	—	September 5, 2008	Kitt Peak	Spacewatch	EOS	1.9 km	MPC · JPL
328399	2008 SW_{3}	—	September 22, 2008	Socorro	LINEAR	·	3.5 km	MPC · JPL
328400	2008 SM_{30}	—	September 6, 2008	Mount Lemmon	Mount Lemmon Survey	·	2.6 km	MPC · JPL

== 328401–328500 ==
back to top

Designation			Discovery			Properties		Ref
Permanent	Provisional	Named after	Date	Site	Discoverer(s)	Category	Diam.	Ref
328401	2008 SO_{30}	—	September 20, 2008	Kitt Peak	Spacewatch	·	3.9 km	MPC · JPL
328402	2008 SF_{34}	—	August 21, 2008	Kitt Peak	Spacewatch	·	3.7 km	MPC · JPL
328403	2008 SE_{47}	—	September 20, 2008	Kitt Peak	Spacewatch	·	3.3 km	MPC · JPL
328404	2008 SH_{48}	—	September 20, 2008	Mount Lemmon	Mount Lemmon Survey	CYB	4.3 km	MPC · JPL
328405	2008 SG_{52}	—	September 20, 2008	Mount Lemmon	Mount Lemmon Survey	·	3.1 km	MPC · JPL
328406	2008 SR_{54}	—	September 20, 2008	Mount Lemmon	Mount Lemmon Survey	·	2.8 km	MPC · JPL
328407	2008 SH_{61}	—	September 20, 2008	Črni Vrh	J. Vales, H. Mikuž	·	5.5 km	MPC · JPL
328408	2008 SV_{63}	—	September 21, 2008	Kitt Peak	Spacewatch	·	3.1 km	MPC · JPL
328409	2008 SH_{75}	—	October 3, 2003	Kitt Peak	Spacewatch	·	2.4 km	MPC · JPL
328410	2008 SN_{78}	—	September 23, 2008	Mount Lemmon	Mount Lemmon Survey	·	2.3 km	MPC · JPL
328411	2008 SS_{89}	—	September 21, 2008	Mount Lemmon	Mount Lemmon Survey	·	2.9 km	MPC · JPL
328412	2008 SK_{94}	—	September 21, 2008	Mount Lemmon	Mount Lemmon Survey	·	2.5 km	MPC · JPL
328413	2008 ST_{106}	—	September 21, 2008	Catalina	CSS	·	4.5 km	MPC · JPL
328414	2008 SP_{126}	—	September 22, 2008	Kitt Peak	Spacewatch	3:2	5.8 km	MPC · JPL
328415	2008 SZ_{157}	—	September 24, 2008	Socorro	LINEAR	EOS	2.0 km	MPC · JPL
328416	2008 SC_{158}	—	September 24, 2008	Socorro	LINEAR	·	5.1 km	MPC · JPL
328417	2008 SB_{161}	—	September 28, 2008	Socorro	LINEAR	·	3.1 km	MPC · JPL
328418	2008 SZ_{164}	—	September 28, 2008	Socorro	LINEAR	TIN	1.0 km	MPC · JPL
328419	2008 SM_{174}	—	September 22, 2008	Catalina	CSS	INA	3.3 km	MPC · JPL
328420	2008 SC_{213}	—	September 6, 2008	Kitt Peak	Spacewatch	CYB	3.0 km	MPC · JPL
328421	2008 SA_{238}	—	September 29, 2008	Goodricke-Pigott	R. A. Tucker	·	3.7 km	MPC · JPL
328422	2008 SY_{250}	—	September 24, 2008	Kitt Peak	Spacewatch	·	2.7 km	MPC · JPL
328423	2008 SP_{253}	—	September 21, 2008	Catalina	CSS	·	5.4 km	MPC · JPL
328424	2008 SR_{255}	—	September 25, 2008	Kitt Peak	Spacewatch	·	3.6 km	MPC · JPL
328425	2008 SZ_{278}	—	September 26, 2008	Kitt Peak	Spacewatch	SYL · CYB	5.8 km	MPC · JPL
328426	2008 SW_{279}	—	September 24, 2008	Mount Lemmon	Mount Lemmon Survey	·	2.0 km	MPC · JPL
328427	2008 SX_{285}	—	September 21, 2008	Catalina	CSS	LIX	4.6 km	MPC · JPL
328428	2008 SZ_{293}	—	October 22, 2003	Apache Point	SDSS	·	3.5 km	MPC · JPL
328429	2008 SK_{299}	—	September 22, 2008	Kitt Peak	Spacewatch	·	3.3 km	MPC · JPL
328430	2008 TG_{4}	—	October 1, 2008	La Sagra	OAM	·	2.2 km	MPC · JPL
328431	2008 TK_{4}	—	October 1, 2008	La Sagra	OAM	EOS	2.2 km	MPC · JPL
328432 Thomasposch	2008 TP_{9}	Thomasposch	October 7, 2008	Altschwendt	W. Ries	·	3.4 km	MPC · JPL
328433	2008 TW_{11}	—	October 1, 2008	Mount Lemmon	Mount Lemmon Survey	ELF	5.2 km	MPC · JPL
328434	2008 TM_{15}	—	October 1, 2008	Mount Lemmon	Mount Lemmon Survey	·	3.7 km	MPC · JPL
328435	2008 TZ_{16}	—	October 1, 2008	Mount Lemmon	Mount Lemmon Survey	·	3.6 km	MPC · JPL
328436	2008 TC_{21}	—	October 1, 2008	Mount Lemmon	Mount Lemmon Survey	THM	2.4 km	MPC · JPL
328437	2008 TH_{24}	—	October 2, 2008	Catalina	CSS	TIR	3.4 km	MPC · JPL
328438	2008 TF_{32}	—	October 1, 2008	Kitt Peak	Spacewatch	·	3.3 km	MPC · JPL
328439	2008 TW_{32}	—	October 1, 2008	Kitt Peak	Spacewatch	·	4.3 km	MPC · JPL
328440	2008 TT_{34}	—	October 1, 2008	Mount Lemmon	Mount Lemmon Survey	SYL · CYB	4.5 km	MPC · JPL
328441	2008 TR_{54}	—	October 2, 2008	Kitt Peak	Spacewatch	·	2.9 km	MPC · JPL
328442	2008 TX_{58}	—	October 2, 2008	Kitt Peak	Spacewatch	3:2	5.1 km	MPC · JPL
328443	2008 TT_{62}	—	October 2, 2008	Kitt Peak	Spacewatch	CYB	4.9 km	MPC · JPL
328444	2008 TQ_{68}	—	October 2, 2008	Kitt Peak	Spacewatch	·	3.4 km	MPC · JPL
328445	2008 TD_{71}	—	October 2, 2008	Kitt Peak	Spacewatch	3:2	6.8 km	MPC · JPL
328446	2008 TX_{87}	—	October 3, 2008	Kitt Peak	Spacewatch	·	5.9 km	MPC · JPL
328447	2008 TT_{92}	—	October 4, 2008	La Sagra	OAM	·	1.8 km	MPC · JPL
328448	2008 TN_{100}	—	October 6, 2008	Mount Lemmon	Mount Lemmon Survey	·	5.5 km	MPC · JPL
328449	2008 TB_{103}	—	October 6, 2008	Catalina	CSS	·	4.8 km	MPC · JPL
328450	2008 TH_{111}	—	October 6, 2008	Catalina	CSS	·	2.9 km	MPC · JPL
328451	2008 TQ_{113}	—	October 6, 2008	Kitt Peak	Spacewatch	3:2	7.7 km	MPC · JPL
328452	2008 TB_{122}	—	October 7, 2008	Catalina	CSS	·	4.1 km	MPC · JPL
328453	2008 TS_{170}	—	October 9, 2008	Mount Lemmon	Mount Lemmon Survey	EUP	4.5 km	MPC · JPL
328454	2008 TY_{175}	—	October 10, 2008	Mount Lemmon	Mount Lemmon Survey	3:2	5.2 km	MPC · JPL
328455	2008 TX_{179}	—	March 9, 2005	Mount Lemmon	Mount Lemmon Survey	·	2.6 km	MPC · JPL
328456	2008 UG_{4}	—	October 24, 2008	Socorro	LINEAR	·	3.0 km	MPC · JPL
328457	2008 UF_{98}	—	October 26, 2008	Socorro	LINEAR	T_{j} (2.98) · EUP	5.0 km	MPC · JPL
328458	2008 UF_{106}	—	October 21, 2008	Kitt Peak	Spacewatch	·	1.8 km	MPC · JPL
328459	2008 UH_{106}	—	October 21, 2008	Kitt Peak	Spacewatch	·	4.0 km	MPC · JPL
328460	2008 UN_{110}	—	October 22, 2008	Kitt Peak	Spacewatch	·	4.1 km	MPC · JPL
328461	2008 US_{159}	—	October 23, 2008	Kitt Peak	Spacewatch	·	4.4 km	MPC · JPL
328462	2008 UM_{189}	—	October 25, 2008	Mount Lemmon	Mount Lemmon Survey	·	2.0 km	MPC · JPL
328463	2008 UJ_{202}	—	October 7, 2008	Catalina	CSS	·	2.8 km	MPC · JPL
328464	2008 UY_{365}	—	October 25, 2008	Catalina	CSS	T_{j} (2.95)	5.3 km	MPC · JPL
328465	2008 VO_{20}	—	November 1, 2008	Mount Lemmon	Mount Lemmon Survey	THB	4.7 km	MPC · JPL
328466	2008 VW_{24}	—	November 2, 2008	Kitt Peak	Spacewatch	THM	2.8 km	MPC · JPL
328467	2008 WP_{42}	—	November 17, 2008	Kitt Peak	Spacewatch	T_{j} (2.99)	4.2 km	MPC · JPL
328468	2008 YY_{31}	—	December 30, 2008	Kitt Peak	Spacewatch	H	740 m	MPC · JPL
328469	2009 BR_{96}	—	January 25, 2009	Kitt Peak	Spacewatch	H	540 m	MPC · JPL
328470	2009 CU_{2}	—	February 4, 2009	Bisei SG Center	BATTeRS	H	640 m	MPC · JPL
328471	2009 CZ_{57}	—	February 3, 2009	Mount Lemmon	Mount Lemmon Survey	H	720 m	MPC · JPL
328472	2009 DM_{44}	—	February 25, 2009	Tzec Maun	Tozzi, F.	H	760 m	MPC · JPL
328473	2009 FW_{56}	—	March 24, 2009	Catalina	CSS	H	760 m	MPC · JPL
328474	2009 FC_{59}	—	March 26, 2009	Kitt Peak	Spacewatch	·	890 m	MPC · JPL
328475	2009 HJ_{2}	—	April 17, 2009	Mount Lemmon	Mount Lemmon Survey	·	4.8 km	MPC · JPL
328476	2009 HD_{9}	—	July 24, 2003	Palomar	NEAT	·	640 m	MPC · JPL
328477 Eckstein	2009 HG_{36}	Eckstein	April 21, 2009	Tzec Maun	E. Schwab	·	780 m	MPC · JPL
328478	2009 HH_{64}	—	April 22, 2009	Kitt Peak	Spacewatch	·	910 m	MPC · JPL
328479	2009 HL_{103}	—	April 18, 2009	Kitt Peak	Spacewatch	·	920 m	MPC · JPL
328480	2009 JW_{14}	—	November 9, 2007	Kitt Peak	Spacewatch	·	730 m	MPC · JPL
328481	2009 KA_{17}	—	May 26, 2009	Kitt Peak	Spacewatch	·	820 m	MPC · JPL
328482	2009 KK_{20}	—	November 19, 2007	Mount Lemmon	Mount Lemmon Survey	·	760 m	MPC · JPL
328483	2009 LZ_{5}	—	June 15, 2009	Mount Lemmon	Mount Lemmon Survey	·	560 m	MPC · JPL
328484	2009 MJ_{5}	—	June 21, 2009	Kitt Peak	Spacewatch	·	930 m	MPC · JPL
328485	2009 MO_{5}	—	June 21, 2009	Catalina	CSS	·	620 m	MPC · JPL
328486	2009 MH_{7}	—	April 18, 2002	Kitt Peak	Spacewatch	·	720 m	MPC · JPL
328487	2009 MX_{8}	—	June 28, 2009	La Sagra	OAM	NYS	1.7 km	MPC · JPL
328488	2009 MY_{9}	—	June 24, 2009	Mount Lemmon	Mount Lemmon Survey	NYS	1.3 km	MPC · JPL
328489	2009 OP_{1}	—	July 17, 2009	Hibiscus	Teamo, N.	·	780 m	MPC · JPL
328490	2009 ON_{2}	—	July 19, 2009	La Sagra	OAM	·	1.8 km	MPC · JPL
328491	2009 OX_{4}	—	July 23, 2009	Tiki	Teamo, N.	·	780 m	MPC · JPL
328492	2009 OC_{6}	—	July 19, 2009	La Sagra	OAM	·	1.6 km	MPC · JPL
328493	2009 OJ_{17}	—	July 28, 2009	Kitt Peak	Spacewatch	·	1.8 km	MPC · JPL
328494	2009 OX_{20}	—	July 25, 2009	La Sagra	OAM	ERI	1.9 km	MPC · JPL
328495	2009 OZ_{24}	—	July 26, 2009	La Sagra	OAM	NYS	1.4 km	MPC · JPL
328496	2009 PQ_{3}	—	August 12, 2009	La Sagra	OAM	·	1.5 km	MPC · JPL
328497	2009 PR_{4}	—	July 29, 2009	Catalina	CSS	BRA	2.3 km	MPC · JPL
328498	2009 PG_{7}	—	August 15, 2009	Catalina	CSS	·	770 m	MPC · JPL
328499	2009 PU_{11}	—	August 15, 2009	Kitt Peak	Spacewatch	NYS	1.1 km	MPC · JPL
328500	2009 PR_{13}	—	August 15, 2009	Kitt Peak	Spacewatch	·	610 m	MPC · JPL

== 328501–328600 ==
back to top

Designation			Discovery			Properties		Ref
Permanent	Provisional	Named after	Date	Site	Discoverer(s)	Category	Diam.	Ref
328501	2009 PQ_{14}	—	August 15, 2009	Kitt Peak	Spacewatch	·	1.5 km	MPC · JPL
328502	2009 PW_{14}	—	August 15, 2009	Needville	J. Dellinger, Sexton, C.	·	1.0 km	MPC · JPL
328503	2009 PD_{15}	—	August 15, 2009	Catalina	CSS	MAS	720 m	MPC · JPL
328504	2009 PP_{15}	—	August 15, 2009	Kitt Peak	Spacewatch	·	2.3 km	MPC · JPL
328505	2009 PM_{16}	—	August 15, 2009	Kitt Peak	Spacewatch	·	2.1 km	MPC · JPL
328506	2009 PH_{17}	—	August 15, 2009	Kitt Peak	Spacewatch	KOR	1.3 km	MPC · JPL
328507	2009 QV_{7}	—	August 18, 2009	Bergisch Gladbach	W. Bickel	VER	3.4 km	MPC · JPL
328508	2009 QH_{9}	—	August 21, 2009	La Sagra	OAM	·	940 m	MPC · JPL
328509 Kostyahrubych	2009 QC_{10}	Kostyahrubych	August 21, 2009	Andrushivka	Andrushivka	MAS	950 m	MPC · JPL
328510	2009 QA_{11}	—	August 22, 2009	Dauban	Kugel, F.	·	1.2 km	MPC · JPL
328511	2009 QF_{11}	—	August 18, 2009	Kitt Peak	Spacewatch	·	1.1 km	MPC · JPL
328512	2009 QR_{11}	—	August 16, 2009	La Sagra	OAM	NYS	1.1 km	MPC · JPL
328513	2009 QP_{12}	—	August 16, 2009	Kitt Peak	Spacewatch	·	1.3 km	MPC · JPL
328514	2009 QT_{15}	—	August 16, 2009	Kitt Peak	Spacewatch	MAS	770 m	MPC · JPL
328515	2009 QR_{19}	—	August 19, 2009	La Sagra	OAM	·	1.2 km	MPC · JPL
328516	2009 QA_{20}	—	August 19, 2009	La Sagra	OAM	·	1.7 km	MPC · JPL
328517	2009 QN_{20}	—	August 19, 2009	Bergisch Gladbach	W. Bickel	·	1.3 km	MPC · JPL
328518	2009 QF_{22}	—	August 20, 2009	La Sagra	OAM	MAS	970 m	MPC · JPL
328519	2009 QZ_{23}	—	August 16, 2009	Catalina	CSS	·	1.3 km	MPC · JPL
328520	2009 QK_{24}	—	August 16, 2009	Catalina	CSS	·	1.5 km	MPC · JPL
328521	2009 QA_{29}	—	August 23, 2009	La Sagra	OAM	·	1.6 km	MPC · JPL
328522	2009 QC_{38}	—	August 31, 2009	Bergisch Gladbach	W. Bickel	MAR	1.1 km	MPC · JPL
328523	2009 QY_{47}	—	August 28, 2009	La Sagra	OAM	·	1.9 km	MPC · JPL
328524	2009 QB_{53}	—	August 17, 2009	Siding Spring	SSS	PHO	1.3 km	MPC · JPL
328525	2009 QC_{56}	—	August 17, 2009	Kitt Peak	Spacewatch	·	3.4 km	MPC · JPL
328526	2009 QR_{57}	—	August 18, 2009	Kitt Peak	Spacewatch	·	2.1 km	MPC · JPL
328527	2009 QV_{58}	—	August 16, 2009	Kitt Peak	Spacewatch	·	1.6 km	MPC · JPL
328528	2009 QK_{60}	—	August 17, 2009	Kitt Peak	Spacewatch	·	2.3 km	MPC · JPL
328529	2009 QA_{62}	—	August 28, 2009	La Sagra	OAM	·	1.5 km	MPC · JPL
328530	2009 QX_{62}	—	August 27, 2009	Kitt Peak	Spacewatch	·	960 m	MPC · JPL
328531	2009 RM_{4}	—	September 13, 2009	Bisei SG Center	BATTeRS	·	1.7 km	MPC · JPL
328532	2009 RD_{12}	—	September 12, 2009	Kitt Peak	Spacewatch	·	1.9 km	MPC · JPL
328533	2009 RH_{14}	—	September 12, 2009	Kitt Peak	Spacewatch	·	2.2 km	MPC · JPL
328534	2009 RE_{17}	—	September 12, 2009	Kitt Peak	Spacewatch	·	2.4 km	MPC · JPL
328535	2009 RL_{18}	—	September 12, 2009	Kitt Peak	Spacewatch	·	2.0 km	MPC · JPL
328536	2009 RQ_{20}	—	September 14, 2009	Kitt Peak	Spacewatch	NEM	2.2 km	MPC · JPL
328537	2009 RU_{23}	—	September 15, 2009	Kitt Peak	Spacewatch	KOR	1.2 km	MPC · JPL
328538	2009 RQ_{25}	—	September 15, 2009	Kitt Peak	Spacewatch	·	4.0 km	MPC · JPL
328539	2009 RZ_{28}	—	January 23, 2006	Kitt Peak	Spacewatch	·	4.0 km	MPC · JPL
328540	2009 RJ_{31}	—	September 14, 2009	Kitt Peak	Spacewatch	·	3.0 km	MPC · JPL
328541	2009 RW_{33}	—	September 14, 2009	Kitt Peak	Spacewatch	·	2.0 km	MPC · JPL
328542	2009 RR_{34}	—	September 14, 2009	Kitt Peak	Spacewatch	·	2.0 km	MPC · JPL
328543	2009 RZ_{34}	—	September 14, 2009	Kitt Peak	Spacewatch	EOS	2.5 km	MPC · JPL
328544	2009 RO_{35}	—	September 14, 2009	Kitt Peak	Spacewatch	·	2.8 km	MPC · JPL
328545	2009 RV_{35}	—	September 14, 2009	Kitt Peak	Spacewatch	·	4.5 km	MPC · JPL
328546	2009 RY_{41}	—	September 15, 2009	Kitt Peak	Spacewatch	·	2.2 km	MPC · JPL
328547	2009 RK_{49}	—	September 15, 2009	Kitt Peak	Spacewatch	·	4.0 km	MPC · JPL
328548	2009 RL_{50}	—	September 15, 2009	Kitt Peak	Spacewatch	VER	2.5 km	MPC · JPL
328549	2009 RK_{56}	—	September 15, 2009	Kitt Peak	Spacewatch	KOR	1.8 km	MPC · JPL
328550	2009 RC_{57}	—	September 15, 2009	Kitt Peak	Spacewatch	·	4.1 km	MPC · JPL
328551	2009 RE_{59}	—	September 15, 2009	Kitt Peak	Spacewatch	·	2.1 km	MPC · JPL
328552	2009 RM_{60}	—	September 14, 2009	Catalina	CSS	·	2.1 km	MPC · JPL
328553	2009 RN_{60}	—	September 14, 2009	Catalina	CSS	·	1.6 km	MPC · JPL
328554	2009 RG_{63}	—	September 13, 2009	Purple Mountain	PMO NEO Survey Program	NYS	1.2 km	MPC · JPL
328555	2009 RH_{69}	—	September 15, 2009	Mount Lemmon	Mount Lemmon Survey	·	2.1 km	MPC · JPL
328556	2009 RF_{72}	—	September 15, 2009	Kitt Peak	Spacewatch	·	920 m	MPC · JPL
328557	2009 RB_{73}	—	September 15, 2009	Kitt Peak	Spacewatch	·	2.3 km	MPC · JPL
328558	2009 RS_{73}	—	September 15, 2009	Kitt Peak	Spacewatch	·	2.7 km	MPC · JPL
328559	2009 RY_{73}	—	September 15, 2009	Kitt Peak	Spacewatch	·	3.3 km	MPC · JPL
328560	2009 RK_{74}	—	September 14, 2009	Socorro	LINEAR	·	1.4 km	MPC · JPL
328561	2009 RW_{74}	—	August 15, 2009	Catalina	CSS	NYS	1.2 km	MPC · JPL
328562	2009 RX_{74}	—	January 12, 2002	Palomar	NEAT	·	2.3 km	MPC · JPL
328563 Mosplanetarium	2009 SZ_{1}	Mosplanetarium	September 17, 2009	Zelenchukskaya Stn	T. V. Krjačko	·	1.6 km	MPC · JPL
328564	2009 SA_{9}	—	September 16, 2009	Mount Lemmon	Mount Lemmon Survey	GAL	1.4 km	MPC · JPL
328565	2009 SH_{12}	—	September 16, 2009	Mount Lemmon	Mount Lemmon Survey	NYS	1.2 km	MPC · JPL
328566	2009 SO_{16}	—	September 17, 2009	Mount Lemmon	Mount Lemmon Survey	·	770 m	MPC · JPL
328567	2009 ST_{16}	—	September 16, 2009	Kitt Peak	Spacewatch	EOS	2.7 km	MPC · JPL
328568	2009 SB_{19}	—	September 21, 2009	Altschwendt	W. Ries	KOR	1.3 km	MPC · JPL
328569	2009 SU_{22}	—	September 16, 2009	Kitt Peak	Spacewatch	·	910 m	MPC · JPL
328570	2009 SR_{23}	—	September 16, 2009	Kitt Peak	Spacewatch	·	1.6 km	MPC · JPL
328571	2009 SY_{26}	—	September 16, 2009	Kitt Peak	Spacewatch	·	1.3 km	MPC · JPL
328572	2009 SD_{27}	—	September 16, 2009	Kitt Peak	Spacewatch	·	1.9 km	MPC · JPL
328573	2009 SJ_{27}	—	September 16, 2009	Kitt Peak	Spacewatch	·	1.6 km	MPC · JPL
328574	2009 SP_{29}	—	September 16, 2009	Kitt Peak	Spacewatch	·	2.3 km	MPC · JPL
328575	2009 SB_{35}	—	November 5, 2005	Kitt Peak	Spacewatch	·	1.6 km	MPC · JPL
328576	2009 SH_{36}	—	September 16, 2009	Kitt Peak	Spacewatch	·	1.0 km	MPC · JPL
328577	2009 SJ_{36}	—	September 16, 2009	Kitt Peak	Spacewatch	·	3.3 km	MPC · JPL
328578	2009 SC_{37}	—	September 16, 2009	Kitt Peak	Spacewatch	·	1.4 km	MPC · JPL
328579	2009 SO_{38}	—	September 16, 2009	Kitt Peak	Spacewatch	·	7.1 km	MPC · JPL
328580	2009 SA_{40}	—	September 16, 2009	Kitt Peak	Spacewatch	KOR	1.4 km	MPC · JPL
328581	2009 SF_{40}	—	September 16, 2009	Kitt Peak	Spacewatch	·	1.7 km	MPC · JPL
328582	2009 SH_{43}	—	September 16, 2009	Kitt Peak	Spacewatch	EOS	2.6 km	MPC · JPL
328583	2009 SY_{45}	—	September 16, 2009	Mount Lemmon	Mount Lemmon Survey	·	1.5 km	MPC · JPL
328584	2009 SG_{46}	—	September 16, 2009	Kitt Peak	Spacewatch	·	1.9 km	MPC · JPL
328585	2009 SM_{46}	—	September 16, 2009	Kitt Peak	Spacewatch	·	2.5 km	MPC · JPL
328586	2009 SQ_{49}	—	September 17, 2009	La Sagra	OAM	EUN	1.6 km	MPC · JPL
328587	2009 SU_{55}	—	September 17, 2009	Kitt Peak	Spacewatch	·	3.1 km	MPC · JPL
328588	2009 SF_{56}	—	September 17, 2009	Kitt Peak	Spacewatch	·	2.7 km	MPC · JPL
328589	2009 SS_{58}	—	September 17, 2009	Kitt Peak	Spacewatch	·	2.7 km	MPC · JPL
328590	2009 SQ_{61}	—	September 17, 2009	Kitt Peak	Spacewatch	·	2.6 km	MPC · JPL
328591	2009 SP_{66}	—	September 17, 2009	Kitt Peak	Spacewatch	AGN	1.5 km	MPC · JPL
328592	2009 ST_{67}	—	September 17, 2009	Kitt Peak	Spacewatch	·	1.9 km	MPC · JPL
328593	2009 SE_{68}	—	September 17, 2009	Kitt Peak	Spacewatch	·	3.8 km	MPC · JPL
328594	2009 SU_{69}	—	September 17, 2009	Mount Lemmon	Mount Lemmon Survey	·	2.1 km	MPC · JPL
328595	2009 SO_{72}	—	September 17, 2009	Mount Lemmon	Mount Lemmon Survey	KOR	1.2 km	MPC · JPL
328596	2009 SK_{74}	—	September 17, 2009	Kitt Peak	Spacewatch	·	3.7 km	MPC · JPL
328597	2009 SS_{74}	—	September 17, 2009	Kitt Peak	Spacewatch	·	2.3 km	MPC · JPL
328598	2009 SZ_{78}	—	September 18, 2009	Kitt Peak	Spacewatch	EOS	1.6 km	MPC · JPL
328599	2009 SH_{87}	—	September 18, 2009	Mount Lemmon	Mount Lemmon Survey	·	2.8 km	MPC · JPL
328600	2009 SU_{87}	—	September 18, 2009	Kitt Peak	Spacewatch	KOR	1.5 km	MPC · JPL

== 328601–328700 ==
back to top

Designation			Discovery			Properties		Ref
Permanent	Provisional	Named after	Date	Site	Discoverer(s)	Category	Diam.	Ref
328601	2009 SC_{88}	—	September 18, 2009	Kitt Peak	Spacewatch	·	2.1 km	MPC · JPL
328602	2009 ST_{92}	—	September 18, 2009	Mount Lemmon	Mount Lemmon Survey	JUN	1.5 km	MPC · JPL
328603	2009 SU_{96}	—	September 19, 2009	Mount Lemmon	Mount Lemmon Survey	·	2.1 km	MPC · JPL
328604	2009 SH_{99}	—	September 22, 2009	Dauban	Kugel, F.	AGN	1.3 km	MPC · JPL
328605	2009 SF_{100}	—	September 20, 2009	Calvin-Rehoboth	Calvin College	KOR	1.5 km	MPC · JPL
328606	2009 SD_{102}	—	October 5, 2004	Anderson Mesa	LONEOS	EOS	2.4 km	MPC · JPL
328607	2009 SN_{106}	—	September 16, 2009	Mount Lemmon	Mount Lemmon Survey	·	1.8 km	MPC · JPL
328608	2009 SL_{110}	—	September 17, 2009	Kitt Peak	Spacewatch	·	3.7 km	MPC · JPL
328609	2009 SR_{114}	—	September 18, 2009	Kitt Peak	Spacewatch	·	2.1 km	MPC · JPL
328610	2009 SR_{117}	—	September 18, 2009	Kitt Peak	Spacewatch	·	4.1 km	MPC · JPL
328611	2009 SV_{117}	—	September 18, 2009	Kitt Peak	Spacewatch	HOF	2.4 km	MPC · JPL
328612	2009 SB_{118}	—	September 18, 2009	Kitt Peak	Spacewatch	·	2.3 km	MPC · JPL
328613	2009 SU_{126}	—	September 18, 2009	Kitt Peak	Spacewatch	·	1.6 km	MPC · JPL
328614	2009 SN_{128}	—	September 18, 2009	Kitt Peak	Spacewatch	AGN	1.2 km	MPC · JPL
328615	2009 SR_{132}	—	September 18, 2009	Kitt Peak	Spacewatch	(31811) ·	5.3 km	MPC · JPL
328616	2009 SS_{138}	—	September 18, 2009	Kitt Peak	Spacewatch	·	3.3 km	MPC · JPL
328617	2009 SP_{142}	—	September 19, 2009	Kitt Peak	Spacewatch	·	2.4 km	MPC · JPL
328618	2009 SG_{144}	—	September 19, 2009	Kitt Peak	Spacewatch	·	2.5 km	MPC · JPL
328619	2009 SU_{144}	—	September 19, 2009	Mount Lemmon	Mount Lemmon Survey	·	1.4 km	MPC · JPL
328620	2009 SD_{145}	—	September 19, 2009	Mount Lemmon	Mount Lemmon Survey	(29841)	1.7 km	MPC · JPL
328621	2009 SS_{146}	—	September 19, 2009	Kitt Peak	Spacewatch	·	2.5 km	MPC · JPL
328622	2009 SL_{150}	—	May 19, 2004	Siding Spring	SSS	·	2.8 km	MPC · JPL
328623	2009 SS_{150}	—	September 20, 2009	Kitt Peak	Spacewatch	·	2.9 km	MPC · JPL
328624	2009 SF_{153}	—	October 29, 2005	Kitt Peak	Spacewatch	·	1.7 km	MPC · JPL
328625	2009 SJ_{154}	—	October 1, 1998	Kitt Peak	Spacewatch	·	1.0 km	MPC · JPL
328626	2009 SG_{159}	—	September 20, 2009	Kitt Peak	Spacewatch	·	3.5 km	MPC · JPL
328627	2009 SW_{170}	—	September 27, 2009	Mayhill	Lowe, A.	·	2.3 km	MPC · JPL
328628	2009 SU_{176}	—	September 19, 2009	Mount Lemmon	Mount Lemmon Survey	L4	9.8 km	MPC · JPL
328629	2009 SE_{181}	—	September 21, 2009	Mount Lemmon	Mount Lemmon Survey	·	1.9 km	MPC · JPL
328630	2009 SX_{182}	—	September 21, 2009	Mount Lemmon	Mount Lemmon Survey	AGN	1.3 km	MPC · JPL
328631	2009 SG_{190}	—	September 22, 2009	Kitt Peak	Spacewatch	·	1.8 km	MPC · JPL
328632	2009 SK_{195}	—	September 22, 2009	Kitt Peak	Spacewatch	·	2.8 km	MPC · JPL
328633	2009 SB_{203}	—	September 22, 2009	Kitt Peak	Spacewatch	·	2.0 km	MPC · JPL
328634	2009 SJ_{203}	—	September 22, 2009	Kitt Peak	Spacewatch	·	1.3 km	MPC · JPL
328635	2009 SF_{205}	—	September 22, 2009	Kitt Peak	Spacewatch	EUN	1.6 km	MPC · JPL
328636	2009 SV_{207}	—	September 23, 2009	Kitt Peak	Spacewatch	EUN	1.8 km	MPC · JPL
328637	2009 SX_{208}	—	September 23, 2009	Kitt Peak	Spacewatch	·	2.4 km	MPC · JPL
328638	2009 SK_{209}	—	September 23, 2009	Kitt Peak	Spacewatch	·	3.4 km	MPC · JPL
328639	2009 SB_{213}	—	September 23, 2009	Kitt Peak	Spacewatch	HOF	3.3 km	MPC · JPL
328640	2009 SK_{213}	—	September 23, 2009	Kitt Peak	Spacewatch	EOS	2.8 km	MPC · JPL
328641	2009 SG_{215}	—	September 23, 2009	Črni Vrh	Skvarč, J.	NYS	1.5 km	MPC · JPL
328642	2009 SD_{216}	—	September 24, 2009	Kitt Peak	Spacewatch	·	1.8 km	MPC · JPL
328643	2009 SX_{216}	—	February 4, 2006	Kitt Peak	Spacewatch	·	2.5 km	MPC · JPL
328644	2009 SP_{220}	—	September 24, 2009	Mount Lemmon	Mount Lemmon Survey	HOF	3.3 km	MPC · JPL
328645	2009 SK_{233}	—	September 19, 2009	Kitt Peak	Spacewatch	·	5.0 km	MPC · JPL
328646	2009 SW_{233}	—	September 23, 2009	Kitt Peak	Spacewatch	NYS	1.3 km	MPC · JPL
328647	2009 SZ_{235}	—	September 16, 2009	Catalina	CSS	·	1.3 km	MPC · JPL
328648	2009 SP_{237}	—	November 2, 2004	Anderson Mesa	LONEOS	·	2.5 km	MPC · JPL
328649	2009 SA_{238}	—	September 16, 2009	Catalina	CSS	·	3.2 km	MPC · JPL
328650	2009 SR_{238}	—	September 16, 2009	Catalina	CSS	·	1.2 km	MPC · JPL
328651	2009 SY_{241}	—	September 19, 2009	Catalina	CSS	·	2.5 km	MPC · JPL
328652	2009 SA_{243}	—	October 10, 2004	Kitt Peak	Spacewatch	·	3.8 km	MPC · JPL
328653	2009 SA_{248}	—	September 22, 2009	Mount Lemmon	Mount Lemmon Survey	·	2.2 km	MPC · JPL
328654	2009 SQ_{252}	—	September 21, 2009	Kitt Peak	Spacewatch	·	1.5 km	MPC · JPL
328655	2009 SV_{252}	—	September 22, 2009	Kitt Peak	Spacewatch	HOF	3.1 km	MPC · JPL
328656	2009 SA_{253}	—	September 22, 2009	Mount Lemmon	Mount Lemmon Survey	·	3.5 km	MPC · JPL
328657	2009 SY_{253}	—	September 25, 2009	Kitt Peak	Spacewatch	·	5.5 km	MPC · JPL
328658	2009 SR_{255}	—	September 23, 2009	Črni Vrh	Skvarč, J.	PHO	920 m	MPC · JPL
328659	2009 SY_{257}	—	September 21, 2009	Mount Lemmon	Mount Lemmon Survey	·	1.8 km	MPC · JPL
328660	2009 SD_{262}	—	September 15, 2009	Kitt Peak	Spacewatch	·	2.1 km	MPC · JPL
328661	2009 SG_{263}	—	September 23, 2009	Mount Lemmon	Mount Lemmon Survey	EOS	2.8 km	MPC · JPL
328662	2009 SG_{265}	—	September 23, 2009	Mount Lemmon	Mount Lemmon Survey	·	4.3 km	MPC · JPL
328663	2009 SR_{275}	—	September 25, 2009	Kitt Peak	Spacewatch	·	2.3 km	MPC · JPL
328664	2009 SJ_{277}	—	September 25, 2009	Kitt Peak	Spacewatch	·	1.1 km	MPC · JPL
328665	2009 SE_{278}	—	September 25, 2009	Kitt Peak	Spacewatch	MAS	570 m	MPC · JPL
328666	2009 SJ_{282}	—	March 11, 2007	Kitt Peak	Spacewatch	HOF	3.3 km	MPC · JPL
328667	2009 SP_{282}	—	September 25, 2009	Kitt Peak	Spacewatch	·	1.3 km	MPC · JPL
328668	2009 SA_{283}	—	September 25, 2009	Kitt Peak	Spacewatch	·	1.8 km	MPC · JPL
328669	2009 SJ_{283}	—	September 25, 2009	Kitt Peak	Spacewatch	·	3.1 km	MPC · JPL
328670	2009 SM_{285}	—	August 15, 2009	Kitt Peak	Spacewatch	·	1.7 km	MPC · JPL
328671	2009 SC_{289}	—	September 25, 2009	Kitt Peak	Spacewatch	·	2.8 km	MPC · JPL
328672	2009 SO_{289}	—	September 25, 2009	Kitt Peak	Spacewatch	·	2.5 km	MPC · JPL
328673	2009 SV_{289}	—	September 25, 2009	Kitt Peak	Spacewatch	·	2.6 km	MPC · JPL
328674	2009 SV_{290}	—	September 25, 2009	Kitt Peak	Spacewatch	·	2.2 km	MPC · JPL
328675	2009 SL_{293}	—	February 6, 2007	Mount Lemmon	Mount Lemmon Survey	·	1.8 km	MPC · JPL
328676	2009 SS_{296}	—	September 28, 2009	Kitt Peak	Spacewatch	·	3.9 km	MPC · JPL
328677 Stofan	2009 SG_{309}	Stofan	September 18, 2009	Anderson Mesa	Wasserman, L. H.	·	1.6 km	MPC · JPL
328678	2009 SY_{311}	—	December 14, 1995	Kitt Peak	Spacewatch	·	1.3 km	MPC · JPL
328679	2009 SG_{323}	—	September 23, 2009	Mount Lemmon	Mount Lemmon Survey	·	1.4 km	MPC · JPL
328680	2009 SE_{327}	—	September 28, 2009	Catalina	CSS	·	3.1 km	MPC · JPL
328681	2009 SK_{332}	—	September 21, 2009	Mount Lemmon	Mount Lemmon Survey	·	1.9 km	MPC · JPL
328682	2009 SE_{336}	—	September 24, 2009	Kitt Peak	Spacewatch	·	3.4 km	MPC · JPL
328683	2009 SB_{341}	—	September 23, 2009	Mount Lemmon	Mount Lemmon Survey	·	3.3 km	MPC · JPL
328684	2009 SF_{341}	—	September 25, 2009	Kitt Peak	Spacewatch	·	2.1 km	MPC · JPL
328685	2009 SY_{342}	—	September 17, 2009	Kitt Peak	Spacewatch	HOF	2.7 km	MPC · JPL
328686	2009 SB_{343}	—	September 17, 2009	Kitt Peak	Spacewatch	·	950 m	MPC · JPL
328687	2009 SS_{344}	—	September 18, 2009	Kitt Peak	Spacewatch	·	1.5 km	MPC · JPL
328688	2009 SE_{345}	—	September 18, 2009	Kitt Peak	Spacewatch	·	1.8 km	MPC · JPL
328689	2009 SR_{347}	—	September 28, 2009	Mount Lemmon	Mount Lemmon Survey	AGN	1.3 km	MPC · JPL
328690	2009 SH_{348}	—	September 21, 2009	Catalina	CSS	·	4.3 km	MPC · JPL
328691	2009 SM_{351}	—	September 18, 2009	Catalina	CSS	TIR	4.3 km	MPC · JPL
328692	2009 SP_{352}	—	March 15, 2007	Mount Lemmon	Mount Lemmon Survey	·	2.4 km	MPC · JPL
328693	2009 SB_{353}	—	September 20, 2009	Kitt Peak	Spacewatch	EOS	1.5 km	MPC · JPL
328694	2009 SO_{353}	—	September 19, 2009	Mount Lemmon	Mount Lemmon Survey	KOR	1.5 km	MPC · JPL
328695	2009 SA_{357}	—	September 20, 2009	Mount Lemmon	Mount Lemmon Survey	·	3.6 km	MPC · JPL
328696	2009 SG_{357}	—	September 21, 2009	Mount Lemmon	Mount Lemmon Survey	·	2.6 km	MPC · JPL
328697	2009 SM_{358}	—	September 17, 2009	Kitt Peak	Spacewatch	·	2.5 km	MPC · JPL
328698	2009 SG_{361}	—	September 29, 2009	Kitt Peak	Spacewatch	·	2.3 km	MPC · JPL
328699	2009 SD_{362}	—	September 19, 2009	Kitt Peak	Spacewatch	THM	2.5 km	MPC · JPL
328700	2009 SC_{363}	—	September 28, 2009	Kitt Peak	Spacewatch	·	2.9 km	MPC · JPL

== 328701–328800 ==
back to top

Designation			Discovery			Properties		Ref
Permanent	Provisional	Named after	Date	Site	Discoverer(s)	Category	Diam.	Ref
328701	2009 SJ_{363}	—	September 17, 2009	Mount Lemmon	Mount Lemmon Survey	·	2.4 km	MPC · JPL
328702	2009 SE_{364}	—	October 7, 2004	Kitt Peak	Spacewatch	·	2.5 km	MPC · JPL
328703	2009 TN_{1}	—	October 11, 2009	La Sagra	OAM	·	2.5 km	MPC · JPL
328704	2009 TW_{2}	—	October 12, 2009	Mayhill	D. Chestnov, A. Novichonok	AGN	1.3 km	MPC · JPL
328705	2009 TG_{3}	—	October 10, 2009	La Sagra	OAM	·	1.8 km	MPC · JPL
328706	2009 TK_{6}	—	October 12, 2009	Mount Lemmon	Mount Lemmon Survey	ADE	3.7 km	MPC · JPL
328707	2009 TS_{6}	—	October 12, 2009	La Sagra	OAM	EOS	3.1 km	MPC · JPL
328708	2009 TW_{8}	—	October 14, 2009	Marly	P. Kocher	EOS	2.3 km	MPC · JPL
328709	2009 TT_{9}	—	October 14, 2009	Socorro	LINEAR	·	2.3 km	MPC · JPL
328710	2009 TZ_{10}	—	October 11, 2009	La Sagra	OAM	·	5.3 km	MPC · JPL
328711	2009 TY_{12}	—	October 10, 2009	Bisei SG Center	BATTeRS	·	2.4 km	MPC · JPL
328712	2009 TA_{13}	—	October 15, 2009	Vail-Jarnac	Jarnac	·	1.8 km	MPC · JPL
328713	2009 TB_{14}	—	October 11, 2009	La Sagra	OAM	·	3.8 km	MPC · JPL
328714	2009 TE_{17}	—	October 15, 2009	La Sagra	OAM	·	2.4 km	MPC · JPL
328715	2009 TH_{17}	—	October 15, 2009	La Sagra	OAM	(5)	1.4 km	MPC · JPL
328716	2009 TP_{17}	—	October 15, 2009	Catalina	CSS	EUN	1.3 km	MPC · JPL
328717	2009 TA_{18}	—	October 15, 2009	La Sagra	OAM	·	2.6 km	MPC · JPL
328718	2009 TA_{20}	—	October 11, 2009	Mount Lemmon	Mount Lemmon Survey	EOS	2.3 km	MPC · JPL
328719	2009 TZ_{20}	—	October 11, 2009	La Sagra	OAM	·	3.7 km	MPC · JPL
328720	2009 TA_{21}	—	October 11, 2009	La Sagra	OAM	MAR	1.3 km	MPC · JPL
328721	2009 TR_{21}	—	October 12, 2009	La Sagra	OAM	·	2.5 km	MPC · JPL
328722	2009 TF_{26}	—	October 14, 2009	Purple Mountain	PMO NEO Survey Program	·	1.9 km	MPC · JPL
328723	2009 TT_{33}	—	October 9, 2009	Catalina	CSS	·	2.7 km	MPC · JPL
328724	2009 TX_{33}	—	February 2, 2006	Mount Lemmon	Mount Lemmon Survey	·	3.7 km	MPC · JPL
328725	2009 TP_{36}	—	October 14, 2009	La Sagra	OAM	·	2.4 km	MPC · JPL
328726	2009 TF_{38}	—	October 14, 2009	Catalina	CSS	·	3.4 km	MPC · JPL
328727	2009 TA_{41}	—	October 14, 2009	Mount Lemmon	Mount Lemmon Survey	·	4.3 km	MPC · JPL
328728	2009 TO_{41}	—	October 1, 2009	Mount Lemmon	Mount Lemmon Survey	·	2.5 km	MPC · JPL
328729	2009 TF_{43}	—	April 2, 2006	Kitt Peak	Spacewatch	·	3.7 km	MPC · JPL
328730	2009 TE_{45}	—	October 14, 2009	La Sagra	OAM	EUN	1.6 km	MPC · JPL
328731	2009 TC_{46}	—	October 14, 2009	Mount Lemmon	Mount Lemmon Survey	·	4.6 km	MPC · JPL
328732	2009 TG_{46}	—	March 27, 2003	Kitt Peak	Spacewatch	L4	10 km	MPC · JPL
328733	2009 TB_{48}	—	October 15, 2009	Mount Lemmon	Mount Lemmon Survey	·	2.3 km	MPC · JPL
328734	2009 UA_{1}	—	October 17, 2009	Tzec Maun	D. Chestnov, A. Novichonok	·	1.3 km	MPC · JPL
328735	2009 UP_{10}	—	October 16, 2009	Mount Lemmon	Mount Lemmon Survey	·	2.4 km	MPC · JPL
328736	2009 UC_{12}	—	October 17, 2009	La Sagra	OAM	·	1.6 km	MPC · JPL
328737	2009 UP_{20}	—	October 24, 2009	Mount Lemmon	Mount Lemmon Survey	·	2.8 km	MPC · JPL
328738	2009 UL_{25}	—	October 18, 2009	Mount Lemmon	Mount Lemmon Survey	EOS	2.7 km	MPC · JPL
328739	2009 UQ_{26}	—	October 21, 2009	Catalina	CSS	CYB	3.2 km	MPC · JPL
328740	2009 UN_{28}	—	October 18, 2009	La Cañada	Lacruz, J.	·	4.1 km	MPC · JPL
328741	2009 UM_{29}	—	November 25, 2005	Kitt Peak	Spacewatch	·	1.6 km	MPC · JPL
328742	2009 UE_{30}	—	October 18, 2009	Mount Lemmon	Mount Lemmon Survey	EOS	3.1 km	MPC · JPL
328743	2009 UF_{30}	—	October 18, 2009	Mount Lemmon	Mount Lemmon Survey	·	1.6 km	MPC · JPL
328744	2009 UV_{31}	—	October 18, 2009	Mount Lemmon	Mount Lemmon Survey	·	3.7 km	MPC · JPL
328745	2009 UY_{33}	—	October 18, 2009	Mount Lemmon	Mount Lemmon Survey	·	2.4 km	MPC · JPL
328746	2009 UM_{36}	—	October 22, 2009	Mount Lemmon	Mount Lemmon Survey	NEM	2.7 km	MPC · JPL
328747	2009 UK_{37}	—	October 22, 2009	Mount Lemmon	Mount Lemmon Survey	·	2.2 km	MPC · JPL
328748	2009 UX_{39}	—	September 20, 2003	Palomar	NEAT	EOS	2.5 km	MPC · JPL
328749	2009 UR_{57}	—	October 23, 2009	Mount Lemmon	Mount Lemmon Survey	·	3.2 km	MPC · JPL
328750	2009 UF_{59}	—	October 23, 2009	Mount Lemmon	Mount Lemmon Survey	·	3.5 km	MPC · JPL
328751	2009 UQ_{60}	—	October 17, 2009	Mount Lemmon	Mount Lemmon Survey	HYG	3.2 km	MPC · JPL
328752	2009 UU_{60}	—	September 29, 2009	Kitt Peak	Spacewatch	EOS	2.4 km	MPC · JPL
328753	2009 UL_{64}	—	October 17, 2009	Mount Lemmon	Mount Lemmon Survey	·	2.1 km	MPC · JPL
328754	2009 UE_{66}	—	October 17, 2009	Mount Lemmon	Mount Lemmon Survey	EOS	2.3 km	MPC · JPL
328755	2009 UT_{70}	—	October 22, 2009	Mount Lemmon	Mount Lemmon Survey	·	2.5 km	MPC · JPL
328756	2009 UL_{76}	—	October 21, 2009	Mount Lemmon	Mount Lemmon Survey	·	3.2 km	MPC · JPL
328757	2009 UC_{88}	—	October 19, 2009	La Sagra	OAM	·	3.9 km	MPC · JPL
328758	2009 UM_{88}	—	October 21, 2009	Catalina	CSS	·	6.1 km	MPC · JPL
328759	2009 UN_{88}	—	October 21, 2009	Catalina	CSS	·	1.6 km	MPC · JPL
328760	2009 UE_{90}	—	October 20, 2009	Socorro	LINEAR	·	2.1 km	MPC · JPL
328761	2009 UN_{94}	—	October 21, 2009	Catalina	CSS	KOR	1.6 km	MPC · JPL
328762	2009 UZ_{94}	—	February 4, 2006	Kitt Peak	Spacewatch	KOR	1.6 km	MPC · JPL
328763	2009 US_{96}	—	October 22, 2009	Mount Lemmon	Mount Lemmon Survey	·	2.2 km	MPC · JPL
328764	2009 UW_{97}	—	October 23, 2009	Mount Lemmon	Mount Lemmon Survey	L4	10 km	MPC · JPL
328765	2009 UL_{99}	—	October 18, 1998	Kitt Peak	Spacewatch	·	2.5 km	MPC · JPL
328766	2009 UR_{100}	—	October 23, 2009	Mount Lemmon	Mount Lemmon Survey	·	5.9 km	MPC · JPL
328767	2009 UD_{102}	—	October 15, 2009	La Sagra	OAM	EOS	2.8 km	MPC · JPL
328768	2009 UV_{106}	—	October 22, 2009	Mount Lemmon	Mount Lemmon Survey	EOS	4.2 km	MPC · JPL
328769	2009 UG_{107}	—	August 9, 2004	Anderson Mesa	LONEOS	·	2.0 km	MPC · JPL
328770	2009 UX_{107}	—	October 23, 2009	Kitt Peak	Spacewatch	3:2 · SHU	5.1 km	MPC · JPL
328771	2009 UL_{108}	—	October 23, 2009	Kitt Peak	Spacewatch	·	2.4 km	MPC · JPL
328772	2009 UY_{109}	—	October 23, 2009	Mount Lemmon	Mount Lemmon Survey	EMA	4.5 km	MPC · JPL
328773	2009 UW_{115}	—	October 21, 2009	Mount Lemmon	Mount Lemmon Survey	·	1.4 km	MPC · JPL
328774	2009 UV_{118}	—	October 23, 2009	Mount Lemmon	Mount Lemmon Survey	·	1.7 km	MPC · JPL
328775	2009 UB_{129}	—	October 29, 2009	Bisei SG Center	BATTeRS	·	3.2 km	MPC · JPL
328776	2009 UA_{136}	—	October 22, 2009	Catalina	CSS	(5)	1.3 km	MPC · JPL
328777	2009 UG_{136}	—	October 26, 2009	Kitt Peak	Spacewatch	·	3.7 km	MPC · JPL
328778	2009 UL_{136}	—	October 23, 2009	Catalina	CSS	EUP	6.3 km	MPC · JPL
328779	2009 UG_{137}	—	October 28, 2009	La Sagra	OAM	·	5.6 km	MPC · JPL
328780	2009 UM_{137}	—	October 16, 2009	Catalina	CSS	·	4.7 km	MPC · JPL
328781	2009 UP_{137}	—	October 17, 2009	Catalina	CSS	ELF	5.4 km	MPC · JPL
328782	2009 UV_{140}	—	May 25, 2007	Mount Lemmon	Mount Lemmon Survey	·	3.2 km	MPC · JPL
328783	2009 UT_{146}	—	October 27, 2009	Kitt Peak	Spacewatch	EOS	1.6 km	MPC · JPL
328784	2009 UB_{147}	—	October 24, 2009	Kitt Peak	Spacewatch	·	3.2 km	MPC · JPL
328785	2009 UH_{150}	—	October 20, 2009	Socorro	LINEAR	·	1.9 km	MPC · JPL
328786	2009 UH_{152}	—	October 24, 2009	Mount Lemmon	Mount Lemmon Survey	·	3.3 km	MPC · JPL
328787	2009 UC_{153}	—	October 24, 2009	Catalina	CSS	·	3.4 km	MPC · JPL
328788	2009 UC_{154}	—	October 20, 2009	Bisei SG Center	BATTeRS	·	4.2 km	MPC · JPL
328789	2009 UF_{155}	—	October 29, 2009	Bisei SG Center	BATTeRS	·	3.6 km	MPC · JPL
328790	2009 VJ_{1}	—	November 9, 2009	Mayhill	Mayhill	EUN	1.5 km	MPC · JPL
328791	2009 VO_{3}	—	November 10, 2009	Tzec Maun	Tozzi, F.	EOS	3.2 km	MPC · JPL
328792	2009 VZ_{3}	—	November 8, 2009	Kitt Peak	Spacewatch	EUN	1.7 km	MPC · JPL
328793	2009 VA_{5}	—	November 8, 2009	Kitt Peak	Spacewatch	RAF	810 m	MPC · JPL
328794	2009 VX_{8}	—	November 8, 2009	Mount Lemmon	Mount Lemmon Survey	·	4.9 km	MPC · JPL
328795	2009 VW_{9}	—	November 8, 2009	Catalina	CSS	(159)	4.3 km	MPC · JPL
328796	2009 VJ_{17}	—	November 8, 2009	Catalina	CSS	·	3.6 km	MPC · JPL
328797	2009 VF_{20}	—	November 9, 2009	Mount Lemmon	Mount Lemmon Survey	EOS	2.6 km	MPC · JPL
328798	2009 VM_{27}	—	November 8, 2009	Kitt Peak	Spacewatch	·	1.7 km	MPC · JPL
328799	2009 VU_{27}	—	September 18, 2009	Mount Lemmon	Mount Lemmon Survey	·	4.6 km	MPC · JPL
328800	2009 VO_{29}	—	November 9, 2009	Kitt Peak	Spacewatch	EOS	2.5 km	MPC · JPL

== 328801–328900 ==
back to top

Designation			Discovery			Properties		Ref
Permanent	Provisional	Named after	Date	Site	Discoverer(s)	Category	Diam.	Ref
328801	2009 VR_{32}	—	November 9, 2009	Mount Lemmon	Mount Lemmon Survey	·	4.4 km	MPC · JPL
328802	2009 VJ_{38}	—	November 9, 2009	Kitt Peak	Spacewatch	·	5.8 km	MPC · JPL
328803	2009 VH_{42}	—	November 13, 2009	Plana	Fratev, F.	·	3.2 km	MPC · JPL
328804	2009 VC_{43}	—	November 9, 2009	Kitt Peak	Spacewatch	EUP	5.7 km	MPC · JPL
328805	2009 VJ_{45}	—	November 11, 2009	Socorro	LINEAR	VER	4.4 km	MPC · JPL
328806	2009 VQ_{45}	—	November 8, 2009	Kitt Peak	Spacewatch	·	3.7 km	MPC · JPL
328807	2009 VO_{47}	—	October 12, 2009	Mount Lemmon	Mount Lemmon Survey	·	8.2 km	MPC · JPL
328808	2009 VT_{57}	—	November 12, 2009	La Sagra	OAM	·	2.3 km	MPC · JPL
328809	2009 VO_{65}	—	November 9, 2009	Kitt Peak	Spacewatch	·	2.8 km	MPC · JPL
328810	2009 VC_{66}	—	November 9, 2009	Kitt Peak	Spacewatch	EOS	2.3 km	MPC · JPL
328811	2009 VP_{68}	—	November 9, 2009	Mount Lemmon	Mount Lemmon Survey	·	2.8 km	MPC · JPL
328812	2009 VQ_{76}	—	November 8, 2009	Catalina	CSS	·	5.4 km	MPC · JPL
328813	2009 VB_{79}	—	November 10, 2009	Catalina	CSS	·	3.7 km	MPC · JPL
328814	2009 VW_{83}	—	November 9, 2009	Kitt Peak	Spacewatch	·	4.8 km	MPC · JPL
328815	2009 VW_{91}	—	November 9, 2009	Catalina	CSS	·	5.7 km	MPC · JPL
328816	2009 VM_{92}	—	November 10, 2009	Mount Lemmon	Mount Lemmon Survey	(1298)	3.4 km	MPC · JPL
328817	2009 VN_{92}	—	November 10, 2009	Catalina	CSS	EOS	2.4 km	MPC · JPL
328818	2009 VR_{95}	—	November 10, 2009	Kitt Peak	Spacewatch	·	3.9 km	MPC · JPL
328819	2009 VL_{98}	—	October 24, 2003	Kitt Peak	Deep Ecliptic Survey	·	3.1 km	MPC · JPL
328820	2009 VY_{105}	—	November 8, 2009	Catalina	CSS	·	3.7 km	MPC · JPL
328821	2009 VN_{107}	—	November 8, 2009	Catalina	CSS	·	3.2 km	MPC · JPL
328822	2009 VM_{109}	—	November 9, 2009	Mount Lemmon	Mount Lemmon Survey	·	5.0 km	MPC · JPL
328823	2009 VU_{111}	—	November 15, 2009	Catalina	CSS	·	3.7 km	MPC · JPL
328824	2009 VK_{115}	—	November 14, 2009	Socorro	LINEAR	·	4.9 km	MPC · JPL
328825	2009 VV_{115}	—	November 15, 2009	Socorro	LINEAR	·	3.6 km	MPC · JPL
328826	2009 WU_{2}	—	March 26, 2003	Palomar	NEAT	·	1.8 km	MPC · JPL
328827	2009 WV_{8}	—	November 19, 2009	Calvin-Rehoboth	L. A. Molnar	·	3.0 km	MPC · JPL
328828	2009 WB_{9}	—	November 18, 2009	Socorro	LINEAR	·	3.5 km	MPC · JPL
328829	2009 WF_{17}	—	October 7, 2004	Kitt Peak	Spacewatch	KOR	1.5 km	MPC · JPL
328830	2009 WX_{23}	—	November 16, 2009	Mayhill	Evdokimova, E.	·	2.5 km	MPC · JPL
328831	2009 WK_{25}	—	November 22, 2009	Catalina	CSS	T_{j} (2.98)	4.9 km	MPC · JPL
328832	2009 WJ_{26}	—	November 20, 2009	Bergisch Gladbach	W. Bickel	TRE	4.2 km	MPC · JPL
328833	2009 WP_{33}	—	November 16, 2009	Kitt Peak	Spacewatch	·	4.6 km	MPC · JPL
328834	2009 WA_{43}	—	November 17, 2009	Catalina	CSS	·	2.9 km	MPC · JPL
328835	2009 WD_{44}	—	November 18, 2009	Kitt Peak	Spacewatch	·	3.1 km	MPC · JPL
328836	2009 WB_{46}	—	August 28, 2009	Kitt Peak	Spacewatch	EOS	2.2 km	MPC · JPL
328837	2009 WU_{47}	—	November 19, 2009	Mount Lemmon	Mount Lemmon Survey	·	3.9 km	MPC · JPL
328838	2009 WD_{55}	—	September 18, 2003	Kitt Peak	Spacewatch	VER	2.8 km	MPC · JPL
328839	2009 WE_{60}	—	November 16, 2009	Kitt Peak	Spacewatch	HIL · 3:2	6.6 km	MPC · JPL
328840	2009 WV_{69}	—	November 18, 2009	Kitt Peak	Spacewatch	·	2.5 km	MPC · JPL
328841	2009 WY_{71}	—	November 18, 2009	Kitt Peak	Spacewatch	3:2	4.4 km	MPC · JPL
328842	2009 WY_{73}	—	October 30, 2009	Mount Lemmon	Mount Lemmon Survey	·	3.0 km	MPC · JPL
328843	2009 WN_{75}	—	November 18, 2009	Kitt Peak	Spacewatch	·	3.1 km	MPC · JPL
328844	2009 WV_{75}	—	November 18, 2009	Kitt Peak	Spacewatch	·	2.9 km	MPC · JPL
328845	2009 WG_{85}	—	November 19, 2009	Kitt Peak	Spacewatch	VER	2.7 km	MPC · JPL
328846	2009 WD_{94}	—	September 15, 2009	Kitt Peak	Spacewatch	THM	3.4 km	MPC · JPL
328847	2009 WK_{94}	—	November 20, 2009	Kitt Peak	Spacewatch	·	2.2 km	MPC · JPL
328848	2009 WT_{95}	—	October 15, 2004	Mount Lemmon	Mount Lemmon Survey	KOR	1.4 km	MPC · JPL
328849	2009 WA_{98}	—	November 21, 2009	Kitt Peak	Spacewatch	·	3.1 km	MPC · JPL
328850	2009 WU_{107}	—	March 5, 2006	Kitt Peak	Spacewatch	HYG	2.6 km	MPC · JPL
328851	2009 WD_{128}	—	November 20, 2009	Kitt Peak	Spacewatch	·	3.9 km	MPC · JPL
328852	2009 WR_{142}	—	March 31, 1995	Kitt Peak	Spacewatch	·	3.8 km	MPC · JPL
328853	2009 WB_{145}	—	November 19, 2009	Mount Lemmon	Mount Lemmon Survey	·	2.9 km	MPC · JPL
328854	2009 WA_{146}	—	November 19, 2009	Catalina	CSS	VER	3.9 km	MPC · JPL
328855	2009 WA_{156}	—	May 13, 2007	Siding Spring	SSS	·	3.5 km	MPC · JPL
328856	2009 WC_{156}	—	November 20, 2009	Kitt Peak	Spacewatch	·	4.6 km	MPC · JPL
328857	2009 WU_{159}	—	November 21, 2009	Kitt Peak	Spacewatch	EMA	4.6 km	MPC · JPL
328858	2009 WW_{170}	—	March 13, 2007	Mount Lemmon	Mount Lemmon Survey	TRE	2.4 km	MPC · JPL
328859	2009 WL_{178}	—	October 2, 2003	Kitt Peak	Spacewatch	EOS	2.3 km	MPC · JPL
328860	2009 WC_{190}	—	November 24, 2009	Kitt Peak	Spacewatch	·	4.0 km	MPC · JPL
328861	2009 WX_{217}	—	November 17, 2009	Catalina	CSS	·	3.4 km	MPC · JPL
328862	2009 WZ_{217}	—	November 17, 2009	Catalina	CSS	EOS	2.8 km	MPC · JPL
328863	2009 WN_{220}	—	October 13, 2004	Kitt Peak	Spacewatch	·	1.9 km	MPC · JPL
328864	2009 WB_{232}	—	November 17, 2009	Mount Lemmon	Mount Lemmon Survey	EMA	5.9 km	MPC · JPL
328865	2009 WX_{233}	—	September 20, 2009	Mount Lemmon	Mount Lemmon Survey	L4	9.8 km	MPC · JPL
328866	2009 WZ_{234}	—	November 19, 2009	Mount Lemmon	Mount Lemmon Survey	·	4.4 km	MPC · JPL
328867	2009 WH_{248}	—	November 17, 2009	Mount Lemmon	Mount Lemmon Survey	·	2.9 km	MPC · JPL
328868	2009 WU_{248}	—	December 7, 2005	Catalina	CSS	·	1.5 km	MPC · JPL
328869	2009 XS_{2}	—	November 18, 2003	Kitt Peak	Spacewatch	·	5.7 km	MPC · JPL
328870 Danabarbato	2009 XN_{7}	Danabarbato	December 11, 2009	Nogales	Robbins, I.	·	4.1 km	MPC · JPL
328871	2010 AO_{61}	—	October 20, 2009	Siding Spring	SSS	T_{j} (2.98)	6.8 km	MPC · JPL
328872	2010 AO_{92}	—	January 8, 2010	WISE	WISE	URS	4.1 km	MPC · JPL
328873	2010 AA_{95}	—	October 14, 2009	Catalina	CSS	·	2.7 km	MPC · JPL
328874	2010 AQ_{114}	—	January 22, 2006	Mount Lemmon	Mount Lemmon Survey	·	3.6 km	MPC · JPL
328875	2010 AX_{115}	—	February 2, 2006	Mount Lemmon	Mount Lemmon Survey	·	5.3 km	MPC · JPL
328876	2010 BT_{25}	—	July 27, 2004	Siding Spring	SSS	·	1.9 km	MPC · JPL
328877	2010 BJ_{70}	—	September 13, 2007	Mount Lemmon	Mount Lemmon Survey	L4	12 km	MPC · JPL
328878	2010 BP_{94}	—	April 26, 2003	Kitt Peak	Spacewatch	L4	11 km	MPC · JPL
328879	2010 BQ_{105}	—	January 19, 2005	Kitt Peak	Spacewatch	LUT	4.9 km	MPC · JPL
328880	2010 CJ_{10}	—	February 8, 2010	WISE	WISE	·	4.6 km	MPC · JPL
328881	2010 CO_{130}	—	September 28, 2008	Mount Lemmon	Mount Lemmon Survey	HIL · 3:2 · (6124)	5.5 km	MPC · JPL
328882	2010 EV_{3}	—	March 2, 2010	WISE	WISE	·	4.6 km	MPC · JPL
328883	2010 HG	—	April 16, 2010	WISE	WISE	L5	16 km	MPC · JPL
328884	2010 LJ_{109}	—	February 17, 2010	Mount Lemmon	Mount Lemmon Survey	centaur	44 km	MPC · JPL
328885	2010 NU_{31}	—	July 7, 2010	WISE	WISE	·	2.8 km	MPC · JPL
328886	2010 OK_{35}	—	July 20, 2010	WISE	WISE	·	4.0 km	MPC · JPL
328887	2010 OJ_{58}	—	March 10, 2007	Palomar	NEAT	·	5.5 km	MPC · JPL
328888	2010 PS_{48}	—	October 23, 2006	Siding Spring	SSS	·	3.0 km	MPC · JPL
328889	2010 RF_{9}	—	February 19, 2009	Catalina	CSS	H	680 m	MPC · JPL
328890	2010 RL_{46}	—	September 2, 2010	Mount Lemmon	Mount Lemmon Survey	·	790 m	MPC · JPL
328891	2010 RQ_{52}	—	September 5, 2010	Bergisch Gladbach	W. Bickel	H	510 m	MPC · JPL
328892	2010 RE_{87}	—	September 2, 2010	Mount Lemmon	Mount Lemmon Survey	·	1.4 km	MPC · JPL
328893	2010 RU_{103}	—	September 28, 2006	Mount Lemmon	Mount Lemmon Survey	·	1.1 km	MPC · JPL
328894	2010 RW_{125}	—	November 11, 2007	Mount Lemmon	Mount Lemmon Survey	·	710 m	MPC · JPL
328895	2010 SR_{12}	—	March 21, 2001	Anderson Mesa	LONEOS	PHO	1.6 km	MPC · JPL
328896	2010 SD_{19}	—	November 29, 2003	Kitt Peak	Spacewatch	·	870 m	MPC · JPL
328897	2010 SV_{28}	—	September 17, 1995	Kitt Peak	Spacewatch	MAS	720 m	MPC · JPL
328898	2010 TA_{6}	—	October 23, 2003	Haleakala	NEAT	·	1.0 km	MPC · JPL
328899	2010 TN_{19}	—	October 5, 2002	Palomar	NEAT	H	660 m	MPC · JPL
328900	2010 TX_{19}	—	October 18, 2007	Kitt Peak	Spacewatch	·	980 m	MPC · JPL

== 328901–329000 ==
back to top

Designation			Discovery			Properties		Ref
Permanent	Provisional	Named after	Date	Site	Discoverer(s)	Category	Diam.	Ref
328901	2010 TK_{25}	—	March 9, 2005	Kitt Peak	Spacewatch	·	910 m	MPC · JPL
328902	2010 TM_{28}	—	October 16, 2006	Mount Lemmon	Mount Lemmon Survey	PHO	1.4 km	MPC · JPL
328903	2010 TW_{28}	—	November 3, 2007	Kitt Peak	Spacewatch	·	690 m	MPC · JPL
328904	2010 TR_{40}	—	February 13, 2002	Palomar	NEAT	·	680 m	MPC · JPL
328905	2010 TP_{42}	—	October 3, 2006	Mount Lemmon	Mount Lemmon Survey	(5)	950 m	MPC · JPL
328906	2010 TO_{129}	—	March 8, 2003	Socorro	LINEAR	JUN	1.3 km	MPC · JPL
328907	2010 TD_{150}	—	October 3, 2006	Mount Lemmon	Mount Lemmon Survey	·	1.5 km	MPC · JPL
328908	2010 TW_{155}	—	November 9, 2007	Kitt Peak	Spacewatch	·	770 m	MPC · JPL
328909	2010 TR_{166}	—	December 17, 2006	Catalina	CSS	JUN	1.2 km	MPC · JPL
328910	2010 TP_{167}	—	February 11, 2004	Kitt Peak	Spacewatch	·	1.3 km	MPC · JPL
328911	2010 UZ_{9}	—	September 15, 2006	Kitt Peak	Spacewatch	MAS	740 m	MPC · JPL
328912	2010 UW_{10}	—	October 14, 2001	Desert Eagle	W. K. Y. Yeung	·	2.4 km	MPC · JPL
328913	2010 UY_{10}	—	October 21, 2006	Mount Lemmon	Mount Lemmon Survey	·	1.2 km	MPC · JPL
328914	2010 UT_{15}	—	December 12, 2006	Palomar	NEAT	·	1.6 km	MPC · JPL
328915	2010 UM_{21}	—	March 28, 2008	Mount Lemmon	Mount Lemmon Survey	·	2.6 km	MPC · JPL
328916	2010 UH_{25}	—	August 23, 2003	Palomar	NEAT	·	760 m	MPC · JPL
328917	2010 US_{27}	—	December 1, 2006	Mount Lemmon	Mount Lemmon Survey	·	2.3 km	MPC · JPL
328918	2010 US_{34}	—	November 18, 2003	Kitt Peak	Spacewatch	V	560 m	MPC · JPL
328919	2010 UX_{35}	—	January 26, 1996	Kitt Peak	Spacewatch	NYS	1.1 km	MPC · JPL
328920	2010 UO_{51}	—	February 7, 2007	Mount Lemmon	Mount Lemmon Survey	·	2.3 km	MPC · JPL
328921	2010 UZ_{51}	—	August 21, 2006	Kitt Peak	Spacewatch	NYS	1.2 km	MPC · JPL
328922	2010 UF_{57}	—	February 9, 2003	Haleakala	NEAT	·	1.6 km	MPC · JPL
328923	2010 UG_{59}	—	December 11, 2004	Kitt Peak	Spacewatch	·	1.3 km	MPC · JPL
328924	2010 UN_{64}	—	April 6, 2003	Kitt Peak	Spacewatch	MRX	1.0 km	MPC · JPL
328925	2010 UO_{82}	—	September 24, 2000	Anderson Mesa	LONEOS	·	780 m	MPC · JPL
328926	2010 UG_{95}	—	March 1, 2008	Kitt Peak	Spacewatch	·	1.6 km	MPC · JPL
328927	2010 UP_{95}	—	January 27, 2003	Palomar	NEAT	·	1.7 km	MPC · JPL
328928	2010 UJ_{100}	—	March 16, 2007	Kitt Peak	Spacewatch	·	3.8 km	MPC · JPL
328929	2010 VN	—	April 17, 2001	Anderson Mesa	LONEOS	H	810 m	MPC · JPL
328930	2010 VG_{12}	—	February 16, 2004	Kitt Peak	Spacewatch	·	1.4 km	MPC · JPL
328931	2010 VP_{13}	—	January 11, 2003	Kitt Peak	Spacewatch	(5)	1.4 km	MPC · JPL
328932	2010 VX_{13}	—	April 8, 2002	Palomar	NEAT	·	1.0 km	MPC · JPL
328933	2010 VS_{17}	—	January 5, 2000	Socorro	LINEAR	·	1.5 km	MPC · JPL
328934	2010 VV_{25}	—	March 10, 2007	Mount Lemmon	Mount Lemmon Survey	·	1.7 km	MPC · JPL
328935	2010 VW_{25}	—	March 10, 2003	Palomar	NEAT	MIS	2.4 km	MPC · JPL
328936	2010 VS_{27}	—	March 23, 1995	Kitt Peak	Spacewatch	·	920 m	MPC · JPL
328937	2010 VW_{37}	—	August 31, 2005	Kitt Peak	Spacewatch	·	2.2 km	MPC · JPL
328938	2010 VM_{39}	—	December 19, 2003	Socorro	LINEAR	·	1.4 km	MPC · JPL
328939	2010 VW_{39}	—	November 5, 2010	Mayhill-ISON	L. Elenin	EUN	1.6 km	MPC · JPL
328940	2010 VW_{41}	—	September 28, 2006	Mount Lemmon	Mount Lemmon Survey	·	1.3 km	MPC · JPL
328941	2010 VJ_{46}	—	September 14, 2005	Kitt Peak	Spacewatch	·	1.8 km	MPC · JPL
328942	2010 VN_{57}	—	September 20, 2003	Kitt Peak	Spacewatch	·	810 m	MPC · JPL
328943	2010 VB_{61}	—	October 6, 2010	La Sagra	OAM	·	2.1 km	MPC · JPL
328944	2010 VO_{62}	—	October 8, 2004	Kitt Peak	Spacewatch	·	2.2 km	MPC · JPL
328945	2010 VR_{62}	—	August 29, 2006	Catalina	CSS	·	1.1 km	MPC · JPL
328946	2010 VY_{62}	—	October 10, 2001	Palomar	NEAT	·	2.2 km	MPC · JPL
328947	2010 VJ_{69}	—	September 18, 2001	Anderson Mesa	LONEOS	·	1.5 km	MPC · JPL
328948	2010 VQ_{71}	—	September 20, 2003	Palomar	NEAT	·	970 m	MPC · JPL
328949	2010 VL_{76}	—	April 10, 2002	Socorro	LINEAR	·	1.0 km	MPC · JPL
328950	2010 VX_{85}	—	January 17, 2004	Palomar	NEAT	·	1.6 km	MPC · JPL
328951	2010 VM_{94}	—	November 11, 2007	Mount Lemmon	Mount Lemmon Survey	·	750 m	MPC · JPL
328952	2010 VF_{105}	—	January 16, 2004	Kitt Peak	Spacewatch	·	1.1 km	MPC · JPL
328953	2010 VT_{111}	—	May 11, 2008	Kitt Peak	Spacewatch	(5)	1.6 km	MPC · JPL
328954	2010 VR_{120}	—	November 11, 2006	Kitt Peak	Spacewatch	RAF	1.1 km	MPC · JPL
328955	2010 VW_{123}	—	December 16, 2007	Kitt Peak	Spacewatch	·	1.5 km	MPC · JPL
328956	2010 VX_{130}	—	November 19, 2001	Socorro	LINEAR	MRX	1.2 km	MPC · JPL
328957	2010 VP_{133}	—	November 9, 2007	Kitt Peak	Spacewatch	·	1.2 km	MPC · JPL
328958	2010 VO_{134}	—	March 3, 2005	Catalina	CSS	·	780 m	MPC · JPL
328959	2010 VG_{137}	—	November 19, 2003	Kitt Peak	Spacewatch	·	1.1 km	MPC · JPL
328960	2010 VB_{142}	—	May 16, 2005	Mount Lemmon	Mount Lemmon Survey	·	1.4 km	MPC · JPL
328961	2010 VJ_{148}	—	September 18, 2003	Kitt Peak	Spacewatch	·	780 m	MPC · JPL
328962	2010 VP_{156}	—	January 23, 2007	Anderson Mesa	LONEOS	JUN	1.1 km	MPC · JPL
328963	2010 VX_{158}	—	April 5, 2002	Palomar	NEAT	·	890 m	MPC · JPL
328964	2010 VN_{159}	—	December 23, 2006	Mount Lemmon	Mount Lemmon Survey	(5)	1.5 km	MPC · JPL
328965	2010 VA_{160}	—	February 17, 1999	Socorro	LINEAR	EUN	1.5 km	MPC · JPL
328966	2010 VF_{165}	—	February 3, 1997	Kitt Peak	Spacewatch	NYS	1.0 km	MPC · JPL
328967	2010 VW_{170}	—	April 6, 2008	Kitt Peak	Spacewatch	·	2.0 km	MPC · JPL
328968	2010 VZ_{172}	—	February 10, 2004	Palomar	NEAT	·	1.4 km	MPC · JPL
328969	2010 VH_{173}	—	December 19, 2004	Mount Lemmon	Mount Lemmon Survey	·	1.0 km	MPC · JPL
328970	2010 VU_{173}	—	March 9, 2008	Socorro	LINEAR	·	1.3 km	MPC · JPL
328971	2010 VZ_{174}	—	February 8, 2003	Haleakala	NEAT	·	1.6 km	MPC · JPL
328972	2010 VJ_{179}	—	March 10, 2005	Kitt Peak	Spacewatch	·	850 m	MPC · JPL
328973	2010 VG_{181}	—	November 11, 2006	Kitt Peak	Spacewatch	·	1.2 km	MPC · JPL
328974	2010 VY_{183}	—	September 19, 2001	Socorro	LINEAR	·	1.6 km	MPC · JPL
328975	2010 VF_{184}	—	September 26, 2000	Socorro	LINEAR	·	780 m	MPC · JPL
328976	2010 VO_{192}	—	September 13, 2004	Kitt Peak	Spacewatch	EOS	2.0 km	MPC · JPL
328977	2010 VE_{194}	—	October 23, 2006	Mount Lemmon	Mount Lemmon Survey	·	1.6 km	MPC · JPL
328978	2010 VJ_{199}	—	March 9, 2003	Palomar	NEAT	EUN	1.7 km	MPC · JPL
328979	2010 VB_{200}	—	March 5, 2002	Apache Point	SDSS	·	880 m	MPC · JPL
328980	2010 VT_{200}	—	November 7, 2010	Catalina	CSS	EUP	4.6 km	MPC · JPL
328981	2010 WL_{7}	—	February 13, 2004	Anderson Mesa	LONEOS	·	1.4 km	MPC · JPL
328982	2010 WV_{7}	—	March 9, 2007	Mount Lemmon	Mount Lemmon Survey	EOS	1.9 km	MPC · JPL
328983	2010 WH_{10}	—	July 8, 2005	Kitt Peak	Spacewatch	·	1.7 km	MPC · JPL
328984	2010 WM_{14}	—	May 6, 2008	Kitt Peak	Spacewatch	EUN	1.3 km	MPC · JPL
328985	2010 WD_{16}	—	November 24, 2006	Mount Lemmon	Mount Lemmon Survey	·	1.2 km	MPC · JPL
328986	2010 WQ_{29}	—	July 25, 2006	Palomar	NEAT	·	1.1 km	MPC · JPL
328987	2010 WS_{29}	—	November 22, 2006	Kitt Peak	Spacewatch	·	1.5 km	MPC · JPL
328988	2010 WB_{48}	—	May 18, 2002	Palomar	NEAT	·	920 m	MPC · JPL
328989	2010 WG_{55}	—	October 22, 2006	Mount Lemmon	Mount Lemmon Survey	·	1.2 km	MPC · JPL
328990	2010 WD_{56}	—	April 3, 2008	Kitt Peak	Spacewatch	·	1.5 km	MPC · JPL
328991	2010 WX_{63}	—	November 17, 2006	Kitt Peak	Spacewatch	·	1.3 km	MPC · JPL
328992	2010 WZ_{65}	—	November 10, 1999	Kitt Peak	Spacewatch	·	3.1 km	MPC · JPL
328993	2010 WY_{71}	—	March 29, 2008	Kitt Peak	Spacewatch	(5)	1.4 km	MPC · JPL
328994	2010 XQ_{3}	—	November 19, 2006	Kitt Peak	Spacewatch	·	1.4 km	MPC · JPL
328995	2010 XL_{8}	—	November 10, 2004	Kitt Peak	Spacewatch	·	4.0 km	MPC · JPL
328996	2010 XL_{17}	—	August 18, 2009	Kitt Peak	Spacewatch	AGN	1.2 km	MPC · JPL
328997	2010 XQ_{18}	—	January 27, 2003	Socorro	LINEAR	(5)	1.7 km	MPC · JPL
328998	2010 XW_{20}	—	November 1, 2006	Mount Lemmon	Mount Lemmon Survey	·	1.2 km	MPC · JPL
328999	2010 XK_{37}	—	December 15, 2004	Kitt Peak	Spacewatch	·	3.3 km	MPC · JPL
329000	2010 XM_{37}	—	December 26, 2005	Kitt Peak	Spacewatch	·	2.3 km	MPC · JPL

back to top

== See also ==
- Meanings of minor-planet names: 328001–329000
