= List of minor planets: 330001–331000 =

The following is a partial list of minor planets, running from minor-planet number 330001 through 331000, inclusive. The primary data for this and other partial lists is based on JPL's "Small-Body Orbital Elements" and data available from the Minor Planet Center. Critical list information is also provided by the MPC, unless otherwise specified from Lowell Observatory. A detailed description of the table's columns and additional sources are given on the main page including a complete list of every page in this series, and a statistical break-up on the dynamical classification of minor planets.

Also see the summary list of all named bodies in numerical and alphabetical order, and the corresponding naming citations for the number range of this particular list. New namings may only be added to this list after official publication, as the preannouncement of names is condemned by the Working Group for Small Bodies Nomenclature of the International Astronomical Union.

| Near-Earth obj. | MBA (inner) | MBA (outer) | Centaur |
| Mars-crosser | MBA (middle) | Jupiter trojan | Trans-Neptunian obj. |
| Unclassified |

== 330001–330100 ==
| Designation | | | Discovery | | | Properties | | Ref |
| Permanent | Provisional | Named after | Date | Site | Discoverer(s) | Category | Diam. | Ref |
|---|---|---|---|---|---|---|---|---|
| 330001 | 2005 TA_{117} | — | October 1, 2005 | Catalina | CSS | HNS | 1.2 km | MPC · JPL |
| 330002 | 2005 TV_{119} | — | October 7, 2005 | Kitt Peak | Spacewatch | · | 1.6 km | MPC · JPL |
| 330003 | 2005 TC_{131} | — | October 7, 2005 | Kitt Peak | Spacewatch | · | 2.1 km | MPC · JPL |
| 330004 | 2005 TG_{136} | — | October 6, 2005 | Kitt Peak | Spacewatch | · | 1.9 km | MPC · JPL |
| 330005 | 2005 TD_{147} | — | October 8, 2005 | Kitt Peak | Spacewatch | · | 1.2 km | MPC · JPL |
| 330006 | 2005 TS_{165} | — | October 9, 2005 | Kitt Peak | Spacewatch | · | 1.8 km | MPC · JPL |
| 330007 | 2005 TY_{170} | — | October 7, 2005 | Socorro | LINEAR | · | 2.1 km | MPC · JPL |
| 330008 | 2005 TS_{190} | — | October 1, 2005 | Mount Lemmon | Mount Lemmon Survey | · | 1.5 km | MPC · JPL |
| 330009 | 2005 UA_{19} | — | October 22, 2005 | Kitt Peak | Spacewatch | · | 1.7 km | MPC · JPL |
| 330010 | 2005 US_{34} | — | October 24, 2005 | Kitt Peak | Spacewatch | (5) | 1.2 km | MPC · JPL |
| 330011 | 2005 UF_{42} | — | October 21, 2005 | Pla D'Arguines | D'Arguines, Pla | (5) | 1.3 km | MPC · JPL |
| 330012 | 2005 UX_{46} | — | October 22, 2005 | Kitt Peak | Spacewatch | · | 1.0 km | MPC · JPL |
| 330013 | 2005 UM_{55} | — | October 23, 2005 | Catalina | CSS | · | 2.2 km | MPC · JPL |
| 330014 | 2005 UD_{64} | — | October 25, 2005 | Catalina | CSS | · | 1.5 km | MPC · JPL |
| 330015 | 2005 UN_{73} | — | October 23, 2005 | Palomar | NEAT | · | 1.6 km | MPC · JPL |
| 330016 | 2005 UE_{79} | — | October 25, 2005 | Catalina | CSS | EUN | 1.4 km | MPC · JPL |
| 330017 | 2005 UQ_{83} | — | October 22, 2005 | Kitt Peak | Spacewatch | · | 1.9 km | MPC · JPL |
| 330018 | 2005 UU_{92} | — | October 22, 2005 | Kitt Peak | Spacewatch | · | 2.1 km | MPC · JPL |
| 330019 | 2005 UC_{98} | — | October 22, 2005 | Kitt Peak | Spacewatch | · | 2.1 km | MPC · JPL |
| 330020 | 2005 UP_{100} | — | October 22, 2005 | Kitt Peak | Spacewatch | · | 1.2 km | MPC · JPL |
| 330021 | 2005 UC_{106} | — | October 22, 2005 | Kitt Peak | Spacewatch | · | 1.9 km | MPC · JPL |
| 330022 | 2005 UM_{108} | — | October 22, 2005 | Kitt Peak | Spacewatch | · | 2.2 km | MPC · JPL |
| 330023 | 2005 UW_{116} | — | October 23, 2005 | Catalina | CSS | · | 2.0 km | MPC · JPL |
| 330024 | 2005 UV_{122} | — | October 24, 2005 | Kitt Peak | Spacewatch | · | 2.9 km | MPC · JPL |
| 330025 | 2005 UT_{125} | — | October 24, 2005 | Kitt Peak | Spacewatch | · | 1.7 km | MPC · JPL |
| 330026 | 2005 UV_{129} | — | October 24, 2005 | Kitt Peak | Spacewatch | · | 1.5 km | MPC · JPL |
| 330027 | 2005 UF_{142} | — | October 25, 2005 | Catalina | CSS | · | 1.4 km | MPC · JPL |
| 330028 | 2005 UW_{157} | — | October 28, 2005 | Bergisch Gladbach | W. Bickel | · | 2.0 km | MPC · JPL |
| 330029 | 2005 UH_{172} | — | October 24, 2005 | Kitt Peak | Spacewatch | · | 1.7 km | MPC · JPL |
| 330030 | 2005 UQ_{180} | — | October 24, 2005 | Kitt Peak | Spacewatch | · | 2.6 km | MPC · JPL |
| 330031 | 2005 UE_{191} | — | October 27, 2005 | Mount Lemmon | Mount Lemmon Survey | · | 2.4 km | MPC · JPL |
| 330032 | 2005 UN_{193} | — | October 22, 2005 | Kitt Peak | Spacewatch | · | 1.1 km | MPC · JPL |
| 330033 | 2005 UB_{199} | — | October 25, 2005 | Kitt Peak | Spacewatch | · | 1.9 km | MPC · JPL |
| 330034 | 2005 UR_{216} | — | October 25, 2005 | Mount Lemmon | Mount Lemmon Survey | · | 2.6 km | MPC · JPL |
| 330035 | 2005 UL_{218} | — | October 25, 2005 | Kitt Peak | Spacewatch | · | 1.4 km | MPC · JPL |
| 330036 | 2005 UH_{232} | — | October 25, 2005 | Mount Lemmon | Mount Lemmon Survey | NEM | 2.8 km | MPC · JPL |
| 330037 | 2005 UF_{233} | — | October 25, 2005 | Kitt Peak | Spacewatch | · | 1.5 km | MPC · JPL |
| 330038 | 2005 UA_{234} | — | October 25, 2005 | Kitt Peak | Spacewatch | · | 1.9 km | MPC · JPL |
| 330039 | 2005 UO_{238} | — | October 25, 2005 | Kitt Peak | Spacewatch | MAR | 1.1 km | MPC · JPL |
| 330040 | 2005 UV_{280} | — | October 24, 2005 | Kitt Peak | Spacewatch | NEM | 2.8 km | MPC · JPL |
| 330041 | 2005 UX_{281} | — | October 25, 2005 | Mount Lemmon | Mount Lemmon Survey | · | 1.2 km | MPC · JPL |
| 330042 | 2005 UN_{286} | — | October 26, 2005 | Kitt Peak | Spacewatch | · | 1.5 km | MPC · JPL |
| 330043 | 2005 UD_{308} | — | October 27, 2005 | Mount Lemmon | Mount Lemmon Survey | · | 1.3 km | MPC · JPL |
| 330044 | 2005 UK_{310} | — | October 29, 2005 | Mount Lemmon | Mount Lemmon Survey | · | 1.7 km | MPC · JPL |
| 330045 | 2005 UC_{313} | — | October 29, 2005 | Catalina | CSS | · | 1.8 km | MPC · JPL |
| 330046 | 2005 UR_{315} | — | October 25, 2005 | Kitt Peak | Spacewatch | · | 1.7 km | MPC · JPL |
| 330047 | 2005 UB_{328} | — | October 30, 2005 | Mount Lemmon | Mount Lemmon Survey | · | 2.1 km | MPC · JPL |
| 330048 | 2005 UU_{328} | — | October 28, 2005 | Mount Lemmon | Mount Lemmon Survey | · | 1.2 km | MPC · JPL |
| 330049 | 2005 UY_{332} | — | October 29, 2005 | Mount Lemmon | Mount Lemmon Survey | (29841) | 1.2 km | MPC · JPL |
| 330050 | 2005 UN_{349} | — | October 25, 2005 | Catalina | CSS | · | 1.7 km | MPC · JPL |
| 330051 | 2005 UE_{365} | — | October 27, 2005 | Kitt Peak | Spacewatch | · | 1.5 km | MPC · JPL |
| 330052 | 2005 UZ_{369} | — | October 27, 2005 | Kitt Peak | Spacewatch | · | 2.1 km | MPC · JPL |
| 330053 | 2005 UY_{372} | — | October 27, 2005 | Kitt Peak | Spacewatch | · | 1.8 km | MPC · JPL |
| 330054 | 2005 UY_{376} | — | October 27, 2005 | Kitt Peak | Spacewatch | · | 1.7 km | MPC · JPL |
| 330055 | 2005 UH_{388} | — | October 26, 2005 | Kitt Peak | Spacewatch | · | 1.9 km | MPC · JPL |
| 330056 | 2005 UC_{423} | — | October 28, 2005 | Uccle | E. W. Elst, H. Debehogne | · | 1.0 km | MPC · JPL |
| 330057 | 2005 UR_{438} | — | October 7, 2005 | Catalina | CSS | · | 1.7 km | MPC · JPL |
| 330058 | 2005 UU_{456} | — | October 30, 2005 | Palomar | NEAT | · | 1.7 km | MPC · JPL |
| 330059 | 2005 UA_{461} | — | October 28, 2005 | Mount Lemmon | Mount Lemmon Survey | · | 1.7 km | MPC · JPL |
| 330060 | 2005 UM_{491} | — | October 24, 2005 | Palomar | NEAT | · | 2.0 km | MPC · JPL |
| 330061 | 2005 UH_{515} | — | October 22, 2005 | Apache Point | A. C. Becker | · | 1.6 km | MPC · JPL |
| 330062 | 2005 UH_{530} | — | October 27, 2005 | Anderson Mesa | LONEOS | · | 2.2 km | MPC · JPL |
| 330063 | 2005 VB_{1} | — | November 3, 2005 | Socorro | LINEAR | H | 720 m | MPC · JPL |
| 330064 | 2005 VX_{1} | — | November 4, 2005 | Socorro | LINEAR | BAR | 1.5 km | MPC · JPL |
| 330065 | 2005 VQ_{5} | — | November 10, 2005 | Gnosca | S. Sposetti | · | 2.1 km | MPC · JPL |
| 330066 | 2005 VX_{25} | — | November 2, 2005 | Mount Lemmon | Mount Lemmon Survey | · | 1.1 km | MPC · JPL |
| 330067 | 2005 VP_{32} | — | November 4, 2005 | Kitt Peak | Spacewatch | · | 2.2 km | MPC · JPL |
| 330068 | 2005 VS_{38} | — | November 3, 2005 | Mount Lemmon | Mount Lemmon Survey | · | 1.0 km | MPC · JPL |
| 330069 | 2005 VM_{53} | — | November 4, 2005 | Socorro | LINEAR | · | 1.4 km | MPC · JPL |
| 330070 | 2005 VG_{56} | — | November 4, 2005 | Kitt Peak | Spacewatch | · | 2.2 km | MPC · JPL |
| 330071 | 2005 VK_{73} | — | November 1, 2005 | Mount Lemmon | Mount Lemmon Survey | · | 2.7 km | MPC · JPL |
| 330072 | 2005 VK_{75} | — | November 1, 2005 | Kitt Peak | Spacewatch | · | 2.1 km | MPC · JPL |
| 330073 | 2005 VP_{85} | — | November 4, 2005 | Kitt Peak | Spacewatch | · | 1.6 km | MPC · JPL |
| 330074 | 2005 VD_{95} | — | November 6, 2005 | Kitt Peak | Spacewatch | NEM | 2.5 km | MPC · JPL |
| 330075 | 2005 VG_{109} | — | November 6, 2005 | Mount Lemmon | Mount Lemmon Survey | · | 940 m | MPC · JPL |
| 330076 | 2005 VU_{109} | — | November 6, 2005 | Mount Lemmon | Mount Lemmon Survey | NEM | 2.5 km | MPC · JPL |
| 330077 | 2005 VZ_{113} | — | November 4, 2005 | Kitt Peak | Spacewatch | · | 1.7 km | MPC · JPL |
| 330078 | 2005 VE_{136} | — | November 12, 2005 | Kitt Peak | Spacewatch | · | 1.5 km | MPC · JPL |
| 330079 | 2005 WH_{3} | — | November 20, 2005 | Palomar | NEAT | · | 2.6 km | MPC · JPL |
| 330080 | 2005 WV_{8} | — | November 21, 2005 | Kitt Peak | Spacewatch | KOR | 1.2 km | MPC · JPL |
| 330081 | 2005 WV_{35} | — | November 22, 2005 | Kitt Peak | Spacewatch | · | 2.1 km | MPC · JPL |
| 330082 | 2005 WZ_{53} | — | November 25, 2005 | Mount Lemmon | Mount Lemmon Survey | H | 460 m | MPC · JPL |
| 330083 | 2005 WL_{57} | — | November 30, 2005 | Mayhill | Mayhill | H | 740 m | MPC · JPL |
| 330084 | 2005 WA_{70} | — | November 26, 2005 | Kitt Peak | Spacewatch | (5) | 1.4 km | MPC · JPL |
| 330085 | 2005 WE_{76} | — | November 25, 2005 | Kitt Peak | Spacewatch | · | 1.3 km | MPC · JPL |
| 330086 | 2005 WZ_{89} | — | November 26, 2005 | Mount Lemmon | Mount Lemmon Survey | · | 2.4 km | MPC · JPL |
| 330087 | 2005 WD_{90} | — | November 26, 2005 | Mount Lemmon | Mount Lemmon Survey | · | 2.4 km | MPC · JPL |
| 330088 | 2005 WL_{90} | — | November 28, 2005 | Socorro | LINEAR | · | 1.8 km | MPC · JPL |
| 330089 | 2005 WP_{91} | — | November 28, 2005 | Catalina | CSS | · | 1.9 km | MPC · JPL |
| 330090 | 2005 WL_{92} | — | October 25, 2005 | Mount Lemmon | Mount Lemmon Survey | · | 1.6 km | MPC · JPL |
| 330091 | 2005 WS_{92} | — | November 25, 2005 | Mount Lemmon | Mount Lemmon Survey | (5) | 1.5 km | MPC · JPL |
| 330092 | 2005 WV_{92} | — | November 25, 2005 | Mount Lemmon | Mount Lemmon Survey | · | 3.2 km | MPC · JPL |
| 330093 | 2005 WP_{103} | — | November 26, 2005 | Catalina | CSS | MAR | 1.2 km | MPC · JPL |
| 330094 | 2005 WM_{108} | — | November 29, 2005 | Mount Lemmon | Mount Lemmon Survey | · | 1.6 km | MPC · JPL |
| 330095 | 2005 WC_{115} | — | November 29, 2005 | Mount Lemmon | Mount Lemmon Survey | HOF | 3.3 km | MPC · JPL |
| 330096 | 2005 WA_{119} | — | November 26, 2005 | Mount Lemmon | Mount Lemmon Survey | · | 1.6 km | MPC · JPL |
| 330097 | 2005 WU_{120} | — | November 30, 2005 | Socorro | LINEAR | EUN | 2.0 km | MPC · JPL |
| 330098 | 2005 WT_{123} | — | October 1, 2005 | Mount Lemmon | Mount Lemmon Survey | · | 1.4 km | MPC · JPL |
| 330099 | 2005 WM_{144} | — | November 24, 2005 | Palomar | NEAT | JUN | 1.0 km | MPC · JPL |
| 330100 | 2005 WW_{147} | — | November 25, 2005 | Mount Lemmon | Mount Lemmon Survey | · | 1.9 km | MPC · JPL |

== 330101–330200 ==
back to top

| Designation | | | Discovery | | | Properties | | Ref |
| Permanent | Provisional | Named after | Date | Site | Discoverer(s) | Category | Diam. | Ref |
|---|---|---|---|---|---|---|---|---|
| 330101 | 2005 WM_{176} | — | November 30, 2005 | Kitt Peak | Spacewatch | · | 1.9 km | MPC · JPL |
| 330102 | 2005 WV_{183} | — | April 9, 2003 | Kitt Peak | Spacewatch | HNS | 1.4 km | MPC · JPL |
| 330103 | 2005 WD_{189} | — | November 30, 2005 | Socorro | LINEAR | · | 2.1 km | MPC · JPL |
| 330104 | 2005 WF_{189} | — | November 30, 2005 | Socorro | LINEAR | · | 2.2 km | MPC · JPL |
| 330105 | 2005 WV_{194} | — | November 30, 2005 | Anderson Mesa | LONEOS | · | 1.8 km | MPC · JPL |
| 330106 | 2005 WG_{203} | — | November 30, 2005 | Kitt Peak | Spacewatch | NEM | 2.8 km | MPC · JPL |
| 330107 | 2005 XT | — | December 2, 2005 | Mayhill | Lowe, A. | RAF | 1.6 km | MPC · JPL |
| 330108 | 2005 XT_{6} | — | December 2, 2005 | Mount Lemmon | Mount Lemmon Survey | · | 1.7 km | MPC · JPL |
| 330109 | 2005 XZ_{15} | — | November 1, 2005 | Mount Lemmon | Mount Lemmon Survey | · | 2.4 km | MPC · JPL |
| 330110 | 2005 XU_{29} | — | December 7, 2005 | Catalina | CSS | H | 860 m | MPC · JPL |
| 330111 | 2005 XF_{30} | — | December 1, 2005 | Mount Lemmon | Mount Lemmon Survey | · | 1.5 km | MPC · JPL |
| 330112 | 2005 XS_{36} | — | December 4, 2005 | Kitt Peak | Spacewatch | · | 1.8 km | MPC · JPL |
| 330113 | 2005 XB_{41} | — | December 6, 2005 | Kitt Peak | Spacewatch | MAR | 1.1 km | MPC · JPL |
| 330114 | 2005 XZ_{54} | — | December 5, 2005 | Kitt Peak | Spacewatch | · | 1.6 km | MPC · JPL |
| 330115 | 2005 XK_{63} | — | December 5, 2005 | Mount Lemmon | Mount Lemmon Survey | LEO | 1.6 km | MPC · JPL |
| 330116 | 2005 XX_{84} | — | December 7, 2005 | Socorro | LINEAR | H | 780 m | MPC · JPL |
| 330117 | 2005 XC_{107} | — | December 3, 2005 | Mauna Kea | A. Boattini | HYG | 2.4 km | MPC · JPL |
| 330118 | 2005 XA_{112} | — | December 2, 2005 | Kitt Peak | M. W. Buie | · | 1.5 km | MPC · JPL |
| 330119 | 2005 YL | — | December 20, 2005 | Calvin-Rehoboth | Calvin College | · | 2.2 km | MPC · JPL |
| 330120 | 2005 YU_{20} | — | December 24, 2005 | Kitt Peak | Spacewatch | · | 2.1 km | MPC · JPL |
| 330121 | 2005 YT_{24} | — | December 24, 2005 | Kitt Peak | Spacewatch | GEF | 1.7 km | MPC · JPL |
| 330122 | 2005 YJ_{25} | — | December 24, 2005 | Kitt Peak | Spacewatch | · | 1.8 km | MPC · JPL |
| 330123 | 2005 YO_{35} | — | December 25, 2005 | Kitt Peak | Spacewatch | · | 1.9 km | MPC · JPL |
| 330124 | 2005 YZ_{44} | — | December 25, 2005 | Kitt Peak | Spacewatch | AGN | 1.3 km | MPC · JPL |
| 330125 | 2005 YP_{48} | — | December 22, 2005 | Kitt Peak | Spacewatch | AGN | 1.3 km | MPC · JPL |
| 330126 | 2005 YQ_{57} | — | December 24, 2005 | Kitt Peak | Spacewatch | AGN | 1.3 km | MPC · JPL |
| 330127 | 2005 YW_{74} | — | December 5, 2005 | Kitt Peak | Spacewatch | BRA | 1.6 km | MPC · JPL |
| 330128 | 2005 YT_{81} | — | December 24, 2005 | Kitt Peak | Spacewatch | (5) | 1.6 km | MPC · JPL |
| 330129 | 2005 YN_{83} | — | December 24, 2005 | Kitt Peak | Spacewatch | · | 2.9 km | MPC · JPL |
| 330130 | 2005 YO_{84} | — | December 25, 2005 | Kitt Peak | Spacewatch | · | 3.0 km | MPC · JPL |
| 330131 | 2005 YE_{98} | — | December 25, 2005 | Kitt Peak | Spacewatch | · | 4.3 km | MPC · JPL |
| 330132 | 2005 YM_{108} | — | December 25, 2005 | Kitt Peak | Spacewatch | · | 1.6 km | MPC · JPL |
| 330133 | 2005 YS_{109} | — | December 25, 2005 | Kitt Peak | Spacewatch | AGN | 1.5 km | MPC · JPL |
| 330134 | 2005 YJ_{126} | — | December 26, 2005 | Kitt Peak | Spacewatch | · | 1.9 km | MPC · JPL |
| 330135 | 2005 YH_{137} | — | December 26, 2005 | Kitt Peak | Spacewatch | · | 1.8 km | MPC · JPL |
| 330136 | 2005 YW_{144} | — | December 28, 2005 | Mount Lemmon | Mount Lemmon Survey | KOR | 1.4 km | MPC · JPL |
| 330137 | 2005 YW_{151} | — | December 26, 2005 | Kitt Peak | Spacewatch | HOF | 3.4 km | MPC · JPL |
| 330138 | 2005 YN_{172} | — | July 7, 2002 | Palomar | NEAT | H | 720 m | MPC · JPL |
| 330139 | 2005 YK_{188} | — | December 28, 2005 | Mount Lemmon | Mount Lemmon Survey | · | 2.0 km | MPC · JPL |
| 330140 | 2005 YV_{188} | — | December 28, 2005 | Mount Lemmon | Mount Lemmon Survey | AGN | 1.4 km | MPC · JPL |
| 330141 | 2005 YD_{200} | — | December 26, 2005 | Kitt Peak | Spacewatch | · | 3.1 km | MPC · JPL |
| 330142 | 2005 YL_{241} | — | December 30, 2005 | Kitt Peak | Spacewatch | · | 3.5 km | MPC · JPL |
| 330143 | 2005 YG_{266} | — | December 27, 2005 | Kitt Peak | Spacewatch | BRA | 1.7 km | MPC · JPL |
| 330144 | 2006 AM_{6} | — | January 4, 2006 | Socorro | LINEAR | · | 3.4 km | MPC · JPL |
| 330145 | 2006 AB_{30} | — | January 2, 2006 | Mount Lemmon | Mount Lemmon Survey | AGN | 1.4 km | MPC · JPL |
| 330146 | 2006 AG_{31} | — | January 5, 2006 | Kitt Peak | Spacewatch | · | 2.1 km | MPC · JPL |
| 330147 | 2006 AT_{44} | — | January 7, 2006 | Mount Lemmon | Mount Lemmon Survey | · | 2.5 km | MPC · JPL |
| 330148 | 2006 AQ_{69} | — | January 6, 2006 | Kitt Peak | Spacewatch | GEF | 1.8 km | MPC · JPL |
| 330149 | 2006 AC_{77} | — | January 6, 2006 | Kitt Peak | Spacewatch | · | 2.0 km | MPC · JPL |
| 330150 | 2006 AD_{80} | — | January 4, 2006 | Mount Lemmon | Mount Lemmon Survey | · | 5.3 km | MPC · JPL |
| 330151 | 2006 BP_{5} | — | January 21, 2006 | Kitt Peak | Spacewatch | · | 3.8 km | MPC · JPL |
| 330152 | 2006 BY_{22} | — | January 22, 2006 | Mount Lemmon | Mount Lemmon Survey | · | 2.5 km | MPC · JPL |
| 330153 | 2006 BX_{29} | — | January 23, 2006 | Mount Nyukasa | Japan Aerospace Exploration Agency | KOR | 1.5 km | MPC · JPL |
| 330154 | 2006 BA_{35} | — | January 22, 2006 | Mount Lemmon | Mount Lemmon Survey | KOR | 1.3 km | MPC · JPL |
| 330155 | 2006 BY_{35} | — | January 23, 2006 | Kitt Peak | Spacewatch | KOR | 1.3 km | MPC · JPL |
| 330156 | 2006 BR_{38} | — | January 23, 2006 | Mount Lemmon | Mount Lemmon Survey | · | 2.4 km | MPC · JPL |
| 330157 | 2006 BJ_{54} | — | January 25, 2006 | Kitt Peak | Spacewatch | · | 2.1 km | MPC · JPL |
| 330158 | 2006 BX_{55} | — | January 27, 2006 | 7300 | W. K. Y. Yeung | · | 2.6 km | MPC · JPL |
| 330159 | 2006 BO_{59} | — | January 25, 2006 | Kitt Peak | Spacewatch | · | 3.7 km | MPC · JPL |
| 330160 | 2006 BN_{78} | — | January 23, 2006 | Catalina | CSS | TIR | 3.2 km | MPC · JPL |
| 330161 | 2006 BQ_{123} | — | January 26, 2006 | Kitt Peak | Spacewatch | · | 2.4 km | MPC · JPL |
| 330162 | 2006 BR_{133} | — | January 26, 2006 | Mount Lemmon | Mount Lemmon Survey | · | 2.0 km | MPC · JPL |
| 330163 | 2006 BS_{139} | — | January 29, 2006 | Kitt Peak | Spacewatch | · | 2.3 km | MPC · JPL |
| 330164 | 2006 BS_{141} | — | January 25, 2006 | Kitt Peak | Spacewatch | AGN | 1.7 km | MPC · JPL |
| 330165 | 2006 BA_{142} | — | January 8, 2006 | Kitt Peak | Spacewatch | VER | 3.2 km | MPC · JPL |
| 330166 | 2006 BR_{147} | — | January 31, 2006 | 7300 | W. K. Y. Yeung | · | 2.1 km | MPC · JPL |
| 330167 | 2006 BO_{155} | — | January 25, 2006 | Kitt Peak | Spacewatch | · | 2.7 km | MPC · JPL |
| 330168 | 2006 BA_{204} | — | January 31, 2006 | Kitt Peak | Spacewatch | · | 2.1 km | MPC · JPL |
| 330169 | 2006 BS_{206} | — | January 31, 2006 | Mount Lemmon | Mount Lemmon Survey | · | 2.3 km | MPC · JPL |
| 330170 | 2006 BC_{210} | — | January 31, 2006 | Kitt Peak | Spacewatch | · | 2.4 km | MPC · JPL |
| 330171 | 2006 BW_{211} | — | January 31, 2006 | Kitt Peak | Spacewatch | · | 2.3 km | MPC · JPL |
| 330172 | 2006 BY_{219} | — | January 30, 2006 | Kitt Peak | Spacewatch | · | 2.1 km | MPC · JPL |
| 330173 | 2006 BY_{258} | — | January 31, 2006 | Kitt Peak | Spacewatch | · | 2.0 km | MPC · JPL |
| 330174 | 2006 CZ_{8} | — | February 1, 2006 | Mount Lemmon | Mount Lemmon Survey | · | 2.4 km | MPC · JPL |
| 330175 | 2006 CY_{14} | — | February 1, 2006 | Kitt Peak | Spacewatch | · | 4.0 km | MPC · JPL |
| 330176 | 2006 CD_{40} | — | January 21, 2006 | Kitt Peak | Spacewatch | · | 3.6 km | MPC · JPL |
| 330177 | 2006 CJ_{67} | — | February 2, 2006 | Mount Lemmon | Mount Lemmon Survey | · | 2.3 km | MPC · JPL |
| 330178 | 2006 DD_{6} | — | February 20, 2006 | Catalina | CSS | · | 2.8 km | MPC · JPL |
| 330179 | 2006 DW_{24} | — | February 20, 2006 | Kitt Peak | Spacewatch | · | 2.1 km | MPC · JPL |
| 330180 | 2006 DA_{25} | — | February 20, 2006 | Kitt Peak | Spacewatch | · | 2.1 km | MPC · JPL |
| 330181 | 2006 DQ_{47} | — | February 21, 2006 | Mount Lemmon | Mount Lemmon Survey | · | 2.5 km | MPC · JPL |
| 330182 | 2006 DM_{51} | — | February 24, 2006 | Kitt Peak | Spacewatch | KOR | 1.5 km | MPC · JPL |
| 330183 | 2006 DJ_{53} | — | February 24, 2006 | Kitt Peak | Spacewatch | · | 2.5 km | MPC · JPL |
| 330184 | 2006 DF_{56} | — | February 24, 2006 | Mount Lemmon | Mount Lemmon Survey | · | 3.6 km | MPC · JPL |
| 330185 | 2006 DV_{64} | — | January 31, 2006 | Kitt Peak | Spacewatch | · | 2.5 km | MPC · JPL |
| 330186 | 2006 DD_{76} | — | January 31, 2006 | Kitt Peak | Spacewatch | · | 1.8 km | MPC · JPL |
| 330187 | 2006 DW_{76} | — | February 24, 2006 | Kitt Peak | Spacewatch | · | 2.4 km | MPC · JPL |
| 330188 | 2006 DC_{78} | — | January 31, 2006 | Kitt Peak | Spacewatch | · | 2.4 km | MPC · JPL |
| 330189 | 2006 DE_{78} | — | February 24, 2006 | Kitt Peak | Spacewatch | · | 2.2 km | MPC · JPL |
| 330190 | 2006 DH_{78} | — | February 24, 2006 | Kitt Peak | Spacewatch | · | 1.9 km | MPC · JPL |
| 330191 | 2006 DC_{83} | — | February 24, 2006 | Kitt Peak | Spacewatch | · | 3.2 km | MPC · JPL |
| 330192 | 2006 DH_{87} | — | February 24, 2006 | Kitt Peak | Spacewatch | · | 2.9 km | MPC · JPL |
| 330193 | 2006 DO_{87} | — | January 7, 2006 | Mount Lemmon | Mount Lemmon Survey | · | 2.5 km | MPC · JPL |
| 330194 | 2006 DD_{90} | — | February 24, 2006 | Kitt Peak | Spacewatch | · | 2.5 km | MPC · JPL |
| 330195 | 2006 DD_{115} | — | February 27, 2006 | Kitt Peak | Spacewatch | HYG | 4.0 km | MPC · JPL |
| 330196 | 2006 DA_{173} | — | February 27, 2006 | Kitt Peak | Spacewatch | · | 2.5 km | MPC · JPL |
| 330197 | 2006 DQ_{190} | — | February 27, 2006 | Kitt Peak | Spacewatch | · | 2.6 km | MPC · JPL |
| 330198 | 2006 EC_{9} | — | March 2, 2006 | Kitt Peak | Spacewatch | · | 2.3 km | MPC · JPL |
| 330199 | 2006 ET_{12} | — | March 2, 2006 | Kitt Peak | Spacewatch | · | 3.7 km | MPC · JPL |
| 330200 | 2006 EK_{44} | — | February 25, 2006 | Anderson Mesa | LONEOS | TIR | 3.9 km | MPC · JPL |

== 330201–330300 ==
back to top

| Designation | | | Discovery | | | Properties | | Ref |
| Permanent | Provisional | Named after | Date | Site | Discoverer(s) | Category | Diam. | Ref |
|---|---|---|---|---|---|---|---|---|
| 330201 | 2006 FT_{5} | — | February 25, 2006 | Kitt Peak | Spacewatch | · | 2.5 km | MPC · JPL |
| 330202 | 2006 FG_{13} | — | March 23, 2006 | Kitt Peak | Spacewatch | · | 4.6 km | MPC · JPL |
| 330203 | 2006 FB_{15} | — | March 23, 2006 | Kitt Peak | Spacewatch | · | 2.7 km | MPC · JPL |
| 330204 | 2006 FE_{16} | — | March 23, 2006 | Mount Lemmon | Mount Lemmon Survey | HYG | 2.9 km | MPC · JPL |
| 330205 | 2006 FR_{16} | — | March 23, 2006 | Catalina | CSS | · | 3.9 km | MPC · JPL |
| 330206 | 2006 FE_{38} | — | March 23, 2006 | Kitt Peak | Spacewatch | · | 3.7 km | MPC · JPL |
| 330207 | 2006 FG_{40} | — | September 26, 2003 | Apache Point | SDSS | · | 2.6 km | MPC · JPL |
| 330208 | 2006 FW_{46} | — | March 23, 2006 | Catalina | CSS | · | 3.8 km | MPC · JPL |
| 330209 | 2006 FM_{47} | — | March 24, 2006 | Anderson Mesa | LONEOS | · | 3.2 km | MPC · JPL |
| 330210 | 2006 FS_{50} | — | March 26, 2006 | Catalina | CSS | T_{j} (2.99) · EUP | 4.1 km | MPC · JPL |
| 330211 | 2006 GC_{19} | — | April 2, 2006 | Kitt Peak | Spacewatch | · | 3.7 km | MPC · JPL |
| 330212 | 2006 GD_{21} | — | April 2, 2006 | Kitt Peak | Spacewatch | · | 3.0 km | MPC · JPL |
| 330213 | 2006 GD_{24} | — | April 2, 2006 | Kitt Peak | Spacewatch | THM | 2.4 km | MPC · JPL |
| 330214 | 2006 GE_{26} | — | April 2, 2006 | Kitt Peak | Spacewatch | · | 3.2 km | MPC · JPL |
| 330215 | 2006 GC_{37} | — | April 8, 2006 | Mount Lemmon | Mount Lemmon Survey | · | 6.2 km | MPC · JPL |
| 330216 | 2006 GB_{38} | — | April 2, 2006 | Anderson Mesa | LONEOS | (895) | 5.5 km | MPC · JPL |
| 330217 | 2006 GK_{39} | — | April 13, 2006 | Palomar | NEAT | EUP | 5.6 km | MPC · JPL |
| 330218 | 2006 HX_{6} | — | April 18, 2006 | Palomar | NEAT | T_{j} (2.99) · EUP | 7.0 km | MPC · JPL |
| 330219 | 2006 HB_{12} | — | April 19, 2006 | Kitt Peak | Spacewatch | · | 3.4 km | MPC · JPL |
| 330220 | 2006 HZ_{42} | — | April 24, 2006 | Mount Lemmon | Mount Lemmon Survey | · | 4.4 km | MPC · JPL |
| 330221 | 2006 HC_{49} | — | April 25, 2006 | Kitt Peak | Spacewatch | EOS | 2.6 km | MPC · JPL |
| 330222 | 2006 HA_{74} | — | April 25, 2006 | Kitt Peak | Spacewatch | · | 3.8 km | MPC · JPL |
| 330223 | 2006 HV_{77} | — | March 2, 2006 | Mount Lemmon | Mount Lemmon Survey | · | 3.6 km | MPC · JPL |
| 330224 | 2006 HQ_{115} | — | April 26, 2006 | Kitt Peak | Spacewatch | · | 3.4 km | MPC · JPL |
| 330225 | 2006 JL_{26} | — | May 4, 2006 | Reedy Creek | J. Broughton | · | 4.9 km | MPC · JPL |
| 330226 | 2006 JU_{26} | — | May 7, 2006 | Wrightwood | J. W. Young | (5651) | 4.0 km | MPC · JPL |
| 330227 | 2006 JC_{49} | — | May 1, 2006 | Kitt Peak | Spacewatch | VER | 3.9 km | MPC · JPL |
| 330228 | 2006 KV_{3} | — | May 19, 2006 | Mount Lemmon | Mount Lemmon Survey | · | 3.8 km | MPC · JPL |
| 330229 | 2006 KZ_{11} | — | May 20, 2006 | Kitt Peak | Spacewatch | · | 3.8 km | MPC · JPL |
| 330230 | 2006 KH_{14} | — | May 20, 2006 | Catalina | CSS | · | 5.2 km | MPC · JPL |
| 330231 | 2006 KM_{22} | — | May 20, 2006 | Catalina | CSS | · | 3.4 km | MPC · JPL |
| 330232 | 2006 KQ_{44} | — | October 10, 2002 | Palomar | NEAT | · | 3.9 km | MPC · JPL |
| 330233 | 2006 KV_{86} | — | May 26, 2006 | Mount Lemmon | Mount Lemmon Survey | APO · PHA | 610 m | MPC · JPL |
| 330234 | 2006 KJ_{91} | — | May 25, 2006 | Kitt Peak | Spacewatch | · | 3.7 km | MPC · JPL |
| 330235 | 2006 KM_{92} | — | May 25, 2006 | Kitt Peak | Spacewatch | · | 4.3 km | MPC · JPL |
| 330236 | 2006 KG_{120} | — | May 31, 2006 | Kitt Peak | Spacewatch | · | 5.5 km | MPC · JPL |
| 330237 | 2006 MA_{10} | — | June 21, 2006 | Kitt Peak | Spacewatch | MAS | 820 m | MPC · JPL |
| 330238 | 2006 PC_{42} | — | August 14, 2006 | Palomar | NEAT | · | 820 m | MPC · JPL |
| 330239 | 2006 QN_{12} | — | August 16, 2006 | Siding Spring | SSS | · | 770 m | MPC · JPL |
| 330240 | 2006 QQ_{18} | — | August 17, 2006 | Palomar | NEAT | · | 850 m | MPC · JPL |
| 330241 | 2006 QG_{55} | — | August 20, 2006 | Palomar | NEAT | · | 690 m | MPC · JPL |
| 330242 | 2006 QK_{83} | — | August 27, 2006 | Kitt Peak | Spacewatch | · | 750 m | MPC · JPL |
| 330243 | 2006 QE_{93} | — | August 16, 2006 | Palomar | NEAT | · | 730 m | MPC · JPL |
| 330244 | 2006 QB_{94} | — | August 17, 2006 | Palomar | NEAT | · | 1.1 km | MPC · JPL |
| 330245 | 2006 QZ_{99} | — | August 24, 2006 | Socorro | LINEAR | · | 810 m | MPC · JPL |
| 330246 | 2006 QA_{126} | — | August 16, 2006 | Palomar | NEAT | · | 750 m | MPC · JPL |
| 330247 | 2006 QT_{183} | — | August 30, 2006 | Mayhill | Lowe, A. | EUN | 1.5 km | MPC · JPL |
| 330248 | 2006 RO_{4} | — | September 12, 2006 | Catalina | CSS | · | 780 m | MPC · JPL |
| 330249 | 2006 RA_{10} | — | September 13, 2006 | Palomar | NEAT | · | 1.2 km | MPC · JPL |
| 330250 | 2006 RF_{19} | — | September 14, 2006 | Kitt Peak | Spacewatch | · | 1.3 km | MPC · JPL |
| 330251 | 2006 RL_{38} | — | September 13, 2006 | Palomar | NEAT | · | 920 m | MPC · JPL |
| 330252 | 2006 RZ_{39} | — | September 12, 2006 | Catalina | CSS | T_{j} (2.96) | 5.7 km | MPC · JPL |
| 330253 | 2006 RF_{43} | — | September 14, 2006 | Kitt Peak | Spacewatch | · | 640 m | MPC · JPL |
| 330254 | 2006 RA_{46} | — | September 14, 2006 | Kitt Peak | Spacewatch | · | 1.1 km | MPC · JPL |
| 330255 | 2006 RZ_{52} | — | September 14, 2006 | Kitt Peak | Spacewatch | · | 1.3 km | MPC · JPL |
| 330256 | 2006 RX_{89} | — | September 15, 2006 | Kitt Peak | Spacewatch | · | 690 m | MPC · JPL |
| 330257 | 2006 RX_{93} | — | September 15, 2006 | Kitt Peak | Spacewatch | · | 840 m | MPC · JPL |
| 330258 | 2006 RL_{102} | — | September 14, 2006 | Palomar | NEAT | · | 730 m | MPC · JPL |
| 330259 | 2006 RL_{118} | — | September 14, 2006 | Mauna Kea | Masiero, J. | MAS | 670 m | MPC · JPL |
| 330260 | 2006 SB_{7} | — | September 17, 2006 | Kitt Peak | Spacewatch | · | 1.6 km | MPC · JPL |
| 330261 | 2006 SZ_{7} | — | September 16, 2006 | Catalina | CSS | V | 970 m | MPC · JPL |
| 330262 | 2006 SN_{14} | — | September 17, 2006 | Catalina | CSS | · | 620 m | MPC · JPL |
| 330263 | 2006 SU_{22} | — | September 17, 2006 | Anderson Mesa | LONEOS | · | 770 m | MPC · JPL |
| 330264 | 2006 SR_{55} | — | September 18, 2006 | Catalina | CSS | · | 810 m | MPC · JPL |
| 330265 | 2006 SJ_{57} | — | September 17, 2006 | Kitt Peak | Spacewatch | · | 920 m | MPC · JPL |
| 330266 | 2006 SR_{63} | — | September 18, 2006 | Catalina | CSS | NYS | 1.0 km | MPC · JPL |
| 330267 | 2006 SE_{68} | — | September 19, 2006 | Kitt Peak | Spacewatch | · | 650 m | MPC · JPL |
| 330268 | 2006 SV_{68} | — | September 19, 2006 | Kitt Peak | Spacewatch | · | 770 m | MPC · JPL |
| 330269 | 2006 SD_{76} | — | September 19, 2006 | Kitt Peak | Spacewatch | · | 970 m | MPC · JPL |
| 330270 | 2006 SD_{96} | — | September 18, 2006 | Kitt Peak | Spacewatch | NYS | 1.2 km | MPC · JPL |
| 330271 | 2006 SE_{119} | — | September 18, 2006 | Catalina | CSS | · | 2.8 km | MPC · JPL |
| 330272 | 2006 SY_{130} | — | September 24, 2006 | Calvin-Rehoboth | L. A. Molnar | · | 700 m | MPC · JPL |
| 330273 | 2006 SM_{136} | — | September 20, 2006 | Catalina | CSS | · | 990 m | MPC · JPL |
| 330274 | 2006 SK_{147} | — | September 19, 2006 | Kitt Peak | Spacewatch | · | 1.1 km | MPC · JPL |
| 330275 | 2006 SE_{203} | — | September 25, 2006 | Mount Lemmon | Mount Lemmon Survey | · | 740 m | MPC · JPL |
| 330276 | 2006 SU_{208} | — | September 26, 2006 | Socorro | LINEAR | · | 840 m | MPC · JPL |
| 330277 | 2006 SM_{217} | — | September 28, 2006 | Kitt Peak | Spacewatch | NYS | 1.1 km | MPC · JPL |
| 330278 | 2006 SY_{255} | — | September 26, 2006 | Kitt Peak | Spacewatch | · | 690 m | MPC · JPL |
| 330279 | 2006 SH_{274} | — | September 27, 2006 | Kitt Peak | Spacewatch | · | 1.1 km | MPC · JPL |
| 330280 | 2006 SZ_{288} | — | December 14, 2003 | Kitt Peak | Spacewatch | V | 680 m | MPC · JPL |
| 330281 | 2006 SR_{294} | — | September 25, 2006 | Kitt Peak | Spacewatch | · | 570 m | MPC · JPL |
| 330282 | 2006 SF_{300} | — | September 26, 2006 | Catalina | CSS | · | 1.5 km | MPC · JPL |
| 330283 | 2006 SG_{304} | — | September 27, 2006 | Catalina | CSS | V | 850 m | MPC · JPL |
| 330284 | 2006 SF_{354} | — | September 20, 2006 | Anderson Mesa | LONEOS | · | 850 m | MPC · JPL |
| 330285 | 2006 SA_{358} | — | September 30, 2006 | Mount Lemmon | Mount Lemmon Survey | · | 2.0 km | MPC · JPL |
| 330286 | 2006 SP_{391} | — | September 18, 2006 | Kitt Peak | Spacewatch | V | 700 m | MPC · JPL |
| 330287 | 2006 SP_{394} | — | September 18, 2006 | Kitt Peak | Spacewatch | MAS | 840 m | MPC · JPL |
| 330288 | 2006 SN_{401} | — | September 28, 2006 | Mount Lemmon | Mount Lemmon Survey | · | 1.3 km | MPC · JPL |
| 330289 | 2006 SY_{412} | — | September 17, 2006 | Catalina | CSS | · | 1.5 km | MPC · JPL |
| 330290 | 2006 TV_{6} | — | October 3, 2006 | Mount Lemmon | Mount Lemmon Survey | · | 1.2 km | MPC · JPL |
| 330291 | 2006 TT_{16} | — | October 11, 2006 | Kitt Peak | Spacewatch | MAS | 670 m | MPC · JPL |
| 330292 | 2006 TQ_{20} | — | October 11, 2006 | Kitt Peak | Spacewatch | · | 690 m | MPC · JPL |
| 330293 | 2006 TK_{22} | — | October 11, 2006 | Kitt Peak | Spacewatch | · | 950 m | MPC · JPL |
| 330294 | 2006 TZ_{33} | — | October 12, 2006 | Palomar | NEAT | · | 1.2 km | MPC · JPL |
| 330295 | 2006 TQ_{38} | — | October 12, 2006 | Kitt Peak | Spacewatch | V | 820 m | MPC · JPL |
| 330296 | 2006 TQ_{44} | — | October 12, 2006 | Kitt Peak | Spacewatch | · | 930 m | MPC · JPL |
| 330297 | 2006 TX_{56} | — | October 3, 2006 | Mount Lemmon | Mount Lemmon Survey | · | 870 m | MPC · JPL |
| 330298 | 2006 TH_{63} | — | October 10, 2006 | Palomar | NEAT | · | 670 m | MPC · JPL |
| 330299 | 2006 TM_{63} | — | October 10, 2006 | Palomar | NEAT | · | 910 m | MPC · JPL |
| 330300 | 2006 TO_{73} | — | October 11, 2006 | Palomar | NEAT | · | 840 m | MPC · JPL |

== 330301–330400 ==
back to top

| Designation | | | Discovery | | | Properties | | Ref |
| Permanent | Provisional | Named after | Date | Site | Discoverer(s) | Category | Diam. | Ref |
|---|---|---|---|---|---|---|---|---|
| 330301 | 2006 TE_{74} | — | October 12, 2006 | Palomar | NEAT | · | 1.3 km | MPC · JPL |
| 330302 | 2006 TR_{74} | — | October 11, 2006 | Palomar | NEAT | · | 940 m | MPC · JPL |
| 330303 | 2006 TW_{74} | — | October 11, 2006 | Palomar | NEAT | 3:2 · SHU | 6.1 km | MPC · JPL |
| 330304 | 2006 TE_{75} | — | October 11, 2006 | Palomar | NEAT | · | 1.5 km | MPC · JPL |
| 330305 | 2006 TA_{76} | — | October 11, 2006 | Palomar | NEAT | · | 720 m | MPC · JPL |
| 330306 | 2006 TH_{92} | — | October 14, 2006 | Lulin | Lin, C.-S., Q. Ye | · | 1.4 km | MPC · JPL |
| 330307 | 2006 TM_{124} | — | October 3, 2006 | Mount Lemmon | Mount Lemmon Survey | · | 800 m | MPC · JPL |
| 330308 | 2006 TO_{128} | — | October 1, 2006 | Kitt Peak | Spacewatch | · | 1.1 km | MPC · JPL |
| 330309 | 2006 UL_{4} | — | October 16, 2006 | Kitt Peak | Spacewatch | · | 1.1 km | MPC · JPL |
| 330310 | 2006 UN_{5} | — | October 16, 2006 | Catalina | CSS | (2076) | 1.0 km | MPC · JPL |
| 330311 | 2006 UV_{5} | — | October 16, 2006 | Kitt Peak | Spacewatch | V | 710 m | MPC · JPL |
| 330312 | 2006 UR_{31} | — | October 16, 2006 | Kitt Peak | Spacewatch | CLA | 1.6 km | MPC · JPL |
| 330313 | 2006 UV_{31} | — | October 16, 2006 | Kitt Peak | Spacewatch | · | 1.3 km | MPC · JPL |
| 330314 | 2006 UF_{35} | — | October 16, 2006 | Kitt Peak | Spacewatch | · | 1.1 km | MPC · JPL |
| 330315 | 2006 UL_{37} | — | October 16, 2006 | Kitt Peak | Spacewatch | · | 1.1 km | MPC · JPL |
| 330316 | 2006 UZ_{41} | — | October 16, 2006 | Kitt Peak | Spacewatch | · | 1.2 km | MPC · JPL |
| 330317 | 2006 UK_{55} | — | October 17, 2006 | Kitt Peak | Spacewatch | · | 1.5 km | MPC · JPL |
| 330318 | 2006 UM_{69} | — | October 16, 2006 | Catalina | CSS | · | 2.4 km | MPC · JPL |
| 330319 | 2006 UJ_{87} | — | October 17, 2006 | Mount Lemmon | Mount Lemmon Survey | · | 1.4 km | MPC · JPL |
| 330320 | 2006 UX_{90} | — | October 17, 2006 | Kitt Peak | Spacewatch | · | 750 m | MPC · JPL |
| 330321 | 2006 UV_{97} | — | October 18, 2006 | Kitt Peak | Spacewatch | · | 1 km | MPC · JPL |
| 330322 | 2006 UB_{102} | — | October 18, 2006 | Kitt Peak | Spacewatch | · | 1.3 km | MPC · JPL |
| 330323 | 2006 UB_{108} | — | October 18, 2006 | Kitt Peak | Spacewatch | · | 960 m | MPC · JPL |
| 330324 | 2006 US_{120} | — | October 19, 2006 | Kitt Peak | Spacewatch | MAS | 720 m | MPC · JPL |
| 330325 | 2006 UP_{121} | — | October 19, 2006 | Kitt Peak | Spacewatch | · | 1.0 km | MPC · JPL |
| 330326 | 2006 UK_{163} | — | October 21, 2006 | Mount Lemmon | Mount Lemmon Survey | · | 810 m | MPC · JPL |
| 330327 | 2006 UZ_{179} | — | October 16, 2006 | Catalina | CSS | · | 1.5 km | MPC · JPL |
| 330328 | 2006 UJ_{180} | — | October 16, 2006 | Catalina | CSS | · | 1.1 km | MPC · JPL |
| 330329 | 2006 UO_{182} | — | September 30, 2006 | Catalina | CSS | · | 1.2 km | MPC · JPL |
| 330330 | 2006 UA_{186} | — | October 17, 2006 | Catalina | CSS | · | 860 m | MPC · JPL |
| 330331 | 2006 UJ_{186} | — | August 30, 2006 | Anderson Mesa | LONEOS | · | 950 m | MPC · JPL |
| 330332 | 2006 UZ_{192} | — | October 19, 2006 | Catalina | CSS | · | 1.2 km | MPC · JPL |
| 330333 | 2006 UZ_{208} | — | October 23, 2006 | Kitt Peak | Spacewatch | · | 730 m | MPC · JPL |
| 330334 | 2006 UV_{219} | — | October 16, 2006 | Kitt Peak | Spacewatch | PHO | 1.3 km | MPC · JPL |
| 330335 | 2006 UC_{232} | — | October 21, 2006 | Mount Lemmon | Mount Lemmon Survey | · | 1.0 km | MPC · JPL |
| 330336 | 2006 UG_{263} | — | October 31, 2006 | Bergisch Gladbach | W. Bickel | · | 1.1 km | MPC · JPL |
| 330337 | 2006 UT_{269} | — | October 27, 2006 | Kitt Peak | Spacewatch | · | 970 m | MPC · JPL |
| 330338 | 2006 UO_{272} | — | October 27, 2006 | Mount Lemmon | Mount Lemmon Survey | (5) | 1.1 km | MPC · JPL |
| 330339 | 2006 UG_{280} | — | October 28, 2006 | Mount Lemmon | Mount Lemmon Survey | · | 1.0 km | MPC · JPL |
| 330340 | 2006 UG_{325} | — | September 27, 2006 | Mount Lemmon | Mount Lemmon Survey | · | 2.2 km | MPC · JPL |
| 330341 | 2006 UN_{331} | — | October 23, 2006 | Catalina | CSS | · | 2.5 km | MPC · JPL |
| 330342 | 2006 UQ_{331} | — | October 28, 2006 | Catalina | CSS | PHO | 1.0 km | MPC · JPL |
| 330343 | 2006 UE_{360} | — | October 23, 2006 | Kitt Peak | Spacewatch | · | 1.3 km | MPC · JPL |
| 330344 | 2006 VJ_{10} | — | November 11, 2006 | Mount Lemmon | Mount Lemmon Survey | · | 1.3 km | MPC · JPL |
| 330345 | 2006 VD_{12} | — | November 11, 2006 | Mount Lemmon | Mount Lemmon Survey | · | 1.4 km | MPC · JPL |
| 330346 | 2006 VZ_{14} | — | November 9, 2006 | Kitt Peak | Spacewatch | AGN | 1.0 km | MPC · JPL |
| 330347 | 2006 VE_{20} | — | November 9, 2006 | Kitt Peak | Spacewatch | · | 970 m | MPC · JPL |
| 330348 | 2006 VU_{31} | — | November 11, 2006 | Kitt Peak | Spacewatch | BAP | 1.0 km | MPC · JPL |
| 330349 | 2006 VX_{32} | — | November 11, 2006 | Catalina | CSS | · | 810 m | MPC · JPL |
| 330350 | 2006 VF_{34} | — | November 11, 2006 | Catalina | CSS | MIS | 2.3 km | MPC · JPL |
| 330351 | 2006 VL_{39} | — | November 12, 2006 | Mount Lemmon | Mount Lemmon Survey | MAS | 690 m | MPC · JPL |
| 330352 | 2006 VE_{40} | — | November 12, 2006 | Mount Lemmon | Mount Lemmon Survey | · | 830 m | MPC · JPL |
| 330353 | 2006 VC_{41} | — | November 12, 2006 | Mount Lemmon | Mount Lemmon Survey | · | 800 m | MPC · JPL |
| 330354 | 2006 VY_{57} | — | November 11, 2006 | Kitt Peak | Spacewatch | · | 800 m | MPC · JPL |
| 330355 | 2006 VX_{65} | — | November 11, 2006 | Kitt Peak | Spacewatch | V | 670 m | MPC · JPL |
| 330356 | 2006 VX_{66} | — | November 11, 2006 | Catalina | CSS | MAS | 750 m | MPC · JPL |
| 330357 | 2006 VW_{69} | — | November 11, 2006 | Kitt Peak | Spacewatch | V | 790 m | MPC · JPL |
| 330358 | 2006 VK_{92} | — | November 15, 2006 | Catalina | CSS | · | 1.3 km | MPC · JPL |
| 330359 | 2006 VL_{118} | — | November 14, 2006 | Kitt Peak | Spacewatch | · | 1.2 km | MPC · JPL |
| 330360 | 2006 VV_{122} | — | November 14, 2006 | Kitt Peak | Spacewatch | (5) | 1.2 km | MPC · JPL |
| 330361 | 2006 VN_{140} | — | October 21, 2006 | Mount Lemmon | Mount Lemmon Survey | · | 1.5 km | MPC · JPL |
| 330362 | 2006 VB_{161} | — | November 9, 2006 | Apache Point | Rose, A. E., A. C. Becker | · | 800 m | MPC · JPL |
| 330363 | 2006 VO_{172} | — | November 15, 2006 | Mount Lemmon | Mount Lemmon Survey | · | 1.2 km | MPC · JPL |
| 330364 | 2006 VA_{174} | — | November 1, 2006 | Mount Lemmon | Mount Lemmon Survey | · | 2.4 km | MPC · JPL |
| 330365 | 2006 WG_{5} | — | November 16, 2006 | Kitt Peak | Spacewatch | · | 1.3 km | MPC · JPL |
| 330366 | 2006 WS_{18} | — | November 17, 2006 | Socorro | LINEAR | V | 960 m | MPC · JPL |
| 330367 | 2006 WY_{28} | — | November 18, 2006 | La Sagra | OAM | · | 1.2 km | MPC · JPL |
| 330368 | 2006 WF_{33} | — | November 16, 2006 | Kitt Peak | Spacewatch | · | 1.3 km | MPC · JPL |
| 330369 | 2006 WO_{33} | — | November 16, 2006 | Kitt Peak | Spacewatch | · | 1.4 km | MPC · JPL |
| 330370 | 2006 WY_{39} | — | November 16, 2006 | Kitt Peak | Spacewatch | · | 1.3 km | MPC · JPL |
| 330371 | 2006 WW_{81} | — | November 18, 2006 | Kitt Peak | Spacewatch | · | 1.2 km | MPC · JPL |
| 330372 | 2006 WU_{94} | — | November 19, 2006 | Kitt Peak | Spacewatch | · | 880 m | MPC · JPL |
| 330373 | 2006 WD_{102} | — | November 19, 2006 | Catalina | CSS | T_{j} (2.96) · HIL · 3:2 | 6.9 km | MPC · JPL |
| 330374 | 2006 WD_{175} | — | November 23, 2006 | Kitt Peak | Spacewatch | · | 1.9 km | MPC · JPL |
| 330375 | 2006 WH_{184} | — | September 28, 2006 | Mount Lemmon | Mount Lemmon Survey | · | 2.1 km | MPC · JPL |
| 330376 | 2006 WK_{190} | — | November 25, 2006 | Catalina | CSS | · | 2.5 km | MPC · JPL |
| 330377 | 2006 WJ_{194} | — | November 27, 2006 | Mount Lemmon | Mount Lemmon Survey | · | 2.0 km | MPC · JPL |
| 330378 | 2006 WJ_{198} | — | November 28, 2006 | Mount Lemmon | Mount Lemmon Survey | · | 2.7 km | MPC · JPL |
| 330379 | 2006 XU | — | December 10, 2006 | Pla D'Arguines | R. Ferrando | · | 1.5 km | MPC · JPL |
| 330380 | 2006 XJ_{4} | — | December 14, 2006 | Vicques | M. Ory | BRG | 1.9 km | MPC · JPL |
| 330381 | 2006 XG_{8} | — | December 9, 2006 | Kitt Peak | Spacewatch | · | 1.6 km | MPC · JPL |
| 330382 | 2006 XL_{9} | — | February 6, 2003 | Palomar | NEAT | (1547) | 1.8 km | MPC · JPL |
| 330383 | 2006 XF_{15} | — | December 10, 2006 | Kitt Peak | Spacewatch | · | 1.3 km | MPC · JPL |
| 330384 | 2006 XC_{16} | — | December 10, 2006 | Kitt Peak | Spacewatch | · | 2.1 km | MPC · JPL |
| 330385 | 2006 XP_{17} | — | December 10, 2006 | Kitt Peak | Spacewatch | · | 1.6 km | MPC · JPL |
| 330386 | 2006 XR_{36} | — | December 11, 2006 | Kitt Peak | Spacewatch | EUN | 1.2 km | MPC · JPL |
| 330387 | 2006 XK_{47} | — | December 13, 2006 | Catalina | CSS | · | 1.7 km | MPC · JPL |
| 330388 | 2006 XS_{51} | — | December 14, 2006 | Mount Lemmon | Mount Lemmon Survey | · | 1.4 km | MPC · JPL |
| 330389 | 2006 XQ_{58} | — | December 14, 2006 | Kitt Peak | Spacewatch | · | 1.5 km | MPC · JPL |
| 330390 | 2006 YQ_{1} | — | December 16, 2006 | Mount Lemmon | Mount Lemmon Survey | · | 3.5 km | MPC · JPL |
| 330391 | 2006 YL_{4} | — | December 16, 2006 | Mount Lemmon | Mount Lemmon Survey | · | 1.9 km | MPC · JPL |
| 330392 | 2006 YP_{6} | — | December 17, 2006 | Socorro | LINEAR | · | 3.4 km | MPC · JPL |
| 330393 | 2006 YJ_{14} | — | December 24, 2006 | Gnosca | S. Sposetti | · | 1.3 km | MPC · JPL |
| 330394 | 2006 YP_{14} | — | December 25, 2006 | Junk Bond | D. Healy | ERI | 1.4 km | MPC · JPL |
| 330395 | 2006 YE_{22} | — | September 28, 2006 | Mount Lemmon | Mount Lemmon Survey | · | 1.3 km | MPC · JPL |
| 330396 | 2006 YO_{32} | — | December 21, 2006 | Kitt Peak | Spacewatch | · | 1.4 km | MPC · JPL |
| 330397 | 2006 YT_{38} | — | December 21, 2006 | Kitt Peak | Spacewatch | · | 1.3 km | MPC · JPL |
| 330398 | 2006 YO_{52} | — | December 16, 2006 | Kitt Peak | Spacewatch | · | 1.9 km | MPC · JPL |
| 330399 | 2006 YO_{55} | — | December 21, 2006 | Mount Lemmon | Mount Lemmon Survey | · | 1.5 km | MPC · JPL |
| 330400 | 2007 AM_{6} | — | January 8, 2007 | Kitt Peak | Spacewatch | · | 1.6 km | MPC · JPL |

== 330401–330500 ==
back to top

| Designation | | | Discovery | | | Properties | | Ref |
| Permanent | Provisional | Named after | Date | Site | Discoverer(s) | Category | Diam. | Ref |
|---|---|---|---|---|---|---|---|---|
| 330401 | 2007 AG_{25} | — | January 15, 2007 | Catalina | CSS | (5) | 1.5 km | MPC · JPL |
| 330402 | 2007 BT_{13} | — | January 17, 2007 | Kitt Peak | Spacewatch | · | 2.4 km | MPC · JPL |
| 330403 | 2007 BA_{16} | — | January 17, 2007 | Kitt Peak | Spacewatch | · | 1.7 km | MPC · JPL |
| 330404 | 2007 BJ_{18} | — | January 17, 2007 | Palomar | NEAT | · | 1.5 km | MPC · JPL |
| 330405 | 2007 BX_{19} | — | December 13, 2006 | Kitt Peak | Spacewatch | · | 1.7 km | MPC · JPL |
| 330406 | 2007 BP_{23} | — | November 27, 2006 | Mount Lemmon | Mount Lemmon Survey | · | 1.6 km | MPC · JPL |
| 330407 | 2007 BY_{28} | — | January 24, 2007 | Mount Nyukasa | Japan Aerospace Exploration Agency | · | 1.6 km | MPC · JPL |
| 330408 | 2007 BL_{38} | — | January 24, 2007 | Catalina | CSS | · | 1.4 km | MPC · JPL |
| 330409 | 2007 BS_{45} | — | December 15, 2006 | Mount Lemmon | Mount Lemmon Survey | · | 1.3 km | MPC · JPL |
| 330410 | 2007 BW_{47} | — | January 26, 2007 | Kitt Peak | Spacewatch | · | 1.6 km | MPC · JPL |
| 330411 | 2007 BM_{48} | — | January 17, 2007 | Kitt Peak | Spacewatch | NEM | 2.5 km | MPC · JPL |
| 330412 | 2007 BL_{58} | — | November 23, 2006 | Mount Lemmon | Mount Lemmon Survey | · | 2.3 km | MPC · JPL |
| 330413 | 2007 BP_{58} | — | January 24, 2007 | Catalina | CSS | · | 2.0 km | MPC · JPL |
| 330414 | 2007 BQ_{63} | — | January 27, 2007 | Mount Lemmon | Mount Lemmon Survey | · | 1.4 km | MPC · JPL |
| 330415 | 2007 CT_{7} | — | February 6, 2007 | Kitt Peak | Spacewatch | · | 1.4 km | MPC · JPL |
| 330416 | 2007 CX_{13} | — | February 7, 2007 | Kitt Peak | Spacewatch | · | 1.4 km | MPC · JPL |
| 330417 | 2007 CE_{15} | — | December 2, 2005 | Kitt Peak | Spacewatch | · | 2.4 km | MPC · JPL |
| 330418 | 2007 CD_{18} | — | February 8, 2007 | Mount Lemmon | Mount Lemmon Survey | · | 1.5 km | MPC · JPL |
| 330419 | 2007 CX_{25} | — | February 9, 2007 | Catalina | CSS | · | 1.7 km | MPC · JPL |
| 330420 Tomroman | 2007 CG_{26} | Tomroman | February 11, 2007 | Front Royal | Skillman, D. R. | · | 1.9 km | MPC · JPL |
| 330421 | 2007 CQ_{26} | — | February 9, 2007 | Marly | P. Kocher | · | 2.4 km | MPC · JPL |
| 330422 | 2007 CH_{27} | — | April 20, 2004 | Kitt Peak | Spacewatch | EUN | 1.7 km | MPC · JPL |
| 330423 | 2007 CN_{39} | — | February 6, 2007 | Mount Lemmon | Mount Lemmon Survey | · | 2.1 km | MPC · JPL |
| 330424 | 2007 CR_{46} | — | February 8, 2007 | Palomar | NEAT | · | 3.0 km | MPC · JPL |
| 330425 | 2007 CH_{47} | — | February 8, 2007 | Palomar | NEAT | · | 3.0 km | MPC · JPL |
| 330426 | 2007 CC_{52} | — | February 9, 2007 | Catalina | CSS | · | 1.5 km | MPC · JPL |
| 330427 | 2007 CL_{56} | — | February 15, 2007 | Catalina | CSS | · | 2.1 km | MPC · JPL |
| 330428 | 2007 CM_{61} | — | February 15, 2007 | Palomar | NEAT | ADE | 2.3 km | MPC · JPL |
| 330429 | 2007 CJ_{62} | — | February 10, 2007 | Mount Lemmon | Mount Lemmon Survey | · | 1.7 km | MPC · JPL |
| 330430 | 2007 DW_{6} | — | November 1, 2005 | Mount Lemmon | Mount Lemmon Survey | HOF | 2.9 km | MPC · JPL |
| 330431 | 2007 DH_{10} | — | February 17, 2007 | Kitt Peak | Spacewatch | · | 1.7 km | MPC · JPL |
| 330432 | 2007 DN_{12} | — | February 16, 2007 | Catalina | CSS | · | 1.6 km | MPC · JPL |
| 330433 | 2007 DY_{12} | — | February 16, 2007 | Mount Lemmon | Mount Lemmon Survey | · | 2.9 km | MPC · JPL |
| 330434 | 2007 DS_{13} | — | October 1, 2005 | Mount Lemmon | Mount Lemmon Survey | · | 1.4 km | MPC · JPL |
| 330435 | 2007 DF_{34} | — | February 17, 2007 | Kitt Peak | Spacewatch | · | 1.7 km | MPC · JPL |
| 330436 | 2007 DR_{34} | — | February 17, 2007 | Kitt Peak | Spacewatch | · | 2.9 km | MPC · JPL |
| 330437 | 2007 DT_{39} | — | February 19, 2007 | Kitt Peak | Spacewatch | · | 2.6 km | MPC · JPL |
| 330438 | 2007 DH_{48} | — | February 21, 2007 | Mount Lemmon | Mount Lemmon Survey | · | 2.3 km | MPC · JPL |
| 330439 | 2007 DR_{55} | — | February 21, 2007 | Kitt Peak | Spacewatch | · | 1.7 km | MPC · JPL |
| 330440 Davinadon | 2007 DQ_{60} | Davinadon | February 23, 2007 | Mayhill | Lowe, A. | · | 2.4 km | MPC · JPL |
| 330441 | 2007 DH_{76} | — | February 21, 2007 | Kitt Peak | Spacewatch | · | 1.8 km | MPC · JPL |
| 330442 | 2007 DC_{87} | — | February 23, 2007 | Kitt Peak | Spacewatch | AGN | 1.2 km | MPC · JPL |
| 330443 | 2007 DF_{92} | — | February 23, 2007 | Kitt Peak | Spacewatch | MRX | 940 m | MPC · JPL |
| 330444 | 2007 DP_{96} | — | February 23, 2007 | Mount Lemmon | Mount Lemmon Survey | HNS | 1.2 km | MPC · JPL |
| 330445 | 2007 DQ_{105} | — | February 17, 2007 | Mount Lemmon | Mount Lemmon Survey | · | 1.8 km | MPC · JPL |
| 330446 | 2007 DW_{106} | — | February 23, 2007 | Kitt Peak | Spacewatch | PAD | 1.7 km | MPC · JPL |
| 330447 | 2007 DF_{109} | — | December 27, 2006 | Catalina | CSS | · | 3.6 km | MPC · JPL |
| 330448 | 2007 DN_{109} | — | February 17, 2007 | Kitt Peak | Spacewatch | · | 2.0 km | MPC · JPL |
| 330449 | 2007 EH_{5} | — | March 9, 2007 | Kitt Peak | Spacewatch | · | 1.7 km | MPC · JPL |
| 330450 | 2007 EZ_{5} | — | March 9, 2007 | Mount Lemmon | Mount Lemmon Survey | NEM | 2.6 km | MPC · JPL |
| 330451 | 2007 EP_{7} | — | March 9, 2007 | Mount Lemmon | Mount Lemmon Survey | · | 1.6 km | MPC · JPL |
| 330452 | 2007 EN_{12} | — | March 9, 2007 | Palomar | NEAT | HNS | 1.6 km | MPC · JPL |
| 330453 | 2007 EC_{17} | — | February 8, 2002 | Kitt Peak | Spacewatch | · | 1.8 km | MPC · JPL |
| 330454 | 2007 EX_{19} | — | February 23, 2007 | Mount Lemmon | Mount Lemmon Survey | · | 2.0 km | MPC · JPL |
| 330455 Anbrysse | 2007 EV_{31} | Anbrysse | November 9, 2005 | Uccle | P. De Cat | · | 1.7 km | MPC · JPL |
| 330456 | 2007 EK_{38} | — | March 11, 2007 | Anderson Mesa | LONEOS | T_{j} (2.98) | 5.3 km | MPC · JPL |
| 330457 | 2007 EN_{42} | — | March 9, 2007 | Kitt Peak | Spacewatch | · | 4.1 km | MPC · JPL |
| 330458 | 2007 ES_{117} | — | March 13, 2007 | Mount Lemmon | Mount Lemmon Survey | GEF | 1.2 km | MPC · JPL |
| 330459 | 2007 EL_{128} | — | March 9, 2007 | Mount Lemmon | Mount Lemmon Survey | · | 1.5 km | MPC · JPL |
| 330460 | 2007 EV_{139} | — | March 12, 2007 | Kitt Peak | Spacewatch | · | 3.8 km | MPC · JPL |
| 330461 | 2007 EA_{146} | — | March 12, 2007 | Mount Lemmon | Mount Lemmon Survey | · | 1.5 km | MPC · JPL |
| 330462 | 2007 EK_{148} | — | March 12, 2007 | Mount Lemmon | Mount Lemmon Survey | · | 1.7 km | MPC · JPL |
| 330463 | 2007 EQ_{153} | — | March 12, 2007 | Mount Lemmon | Mount Lemmon Survey | · | 1.8 km | MPC · JPL |
| 330464 | 2007 EJ_{159} | — | March 14, 2007 | Mount Lemmon | Mount Lemmon Survey | · | 1.7 km | MPC · JPL |
| 330465 | 2007 EC_{160} | — | March 14, 2007 | Kitt Peak | Spacewatch | · | 1.7 km | MPC · JPL |
| 330466 | 2007 EV_{171} | — | March 13, 2007 | Mount Lemmon | Mount Lemmon Survey | EUN | 1.3 km | MPC · JPL |
| 330467 | 2007 EL_{183} | — | March 12, 2007 | Mount Lemmon | Mount Lemmon Survey | · | 1.7 km | MPC · JPL |
| 330468 | 2007 EH_{195} | — | March 15, 2007 | Kitt Peak | Spacewatch | NEM | 2.5 km | MPC · JPL |
| 330469 | 2007 EO_{195} | — | March 15, 2007 | Kitt Peak | Spacewatch | · | 1.8 km | MPC · JPL |
| 330470 | 2007 EJ_{199} | — | March 13, 2007 | Catalina | CSS | GAL | 2.3 km | MPC · JPL |
| 330471 | 2007 ER_{199} | — | March 9, 2007 | Catalina | CSS | · | 2.4 km | MPC · JPL |
| 330472 | 2007 EX_{199} | — | March 10, 2007 | Mount Lemmon | Mount Lemmon Survey | · | 2.4 km | MPC · JPL |
| 330473 | 2007 ET_{204} | — | March 11, 2007 | Mount Lemmon | Mount Lemmon Survey | · | 1.3 km | MPC · JPL |
| 330474 | 2007 EZ_{218} | — | March 13, 2007 | Kitt Peak | Spacewatch | WIT | 1.1 km | MPC · JPL |
| 330475 | 2007 EL_{219} | — | March 15, 2007 | Kitt Peak | Spacewatch | HOF | 2.3 km | MPC · JPL |
| 330476 | 2007 FH_{6} | — | August 17, 2004 | Wrightwood | J. W. Young | · | 1.6 km | MPC · JPL |
| 330477 | 2007 FZ_{6} | — | March 16, 2007 | Mount Lemmon | Mount Lemmon Survey | · | 1.3 km | MPC · JPL |
| 330478 | 2007 FU_{30} | — | March 20, 2007 | Mount Lemmon | Mount Lemmon Survey | AGN | 1.1 km | MPC · JPL |
| 330479 | 2007 FL_{49} | — | March 26, 2007 | Catalina | CSS | BRA · fast | 2.3 km | MPC · JPL |
| 330480 | 2007 GE_{9} | — | April 8, 2007 | Kitt Peak | Spacewatch | AGN | 1.6 km | MPC · JPL |
| 330481 | 2007 GU_{17} | — | April 11, 2007 | Kitt Peak | Spacewatch | · | 2.0 km | MPC · JPL |
| 330482 | 2007 GX_{20} | — | April 11, 2007 | Mount Lemmon | Mount Lemmon Survey | · | 2.7 km | MPC · JPL |
| 330483 | 2007 GY_{24} | — | April 11, 2007 | Kleť | Kleť | DOR | 3.2 km | MPC · JPL |
| 330484 | 2007 GX_{39} | — | April 14, 2007 | Kitt Peak | Spacewatch | · | 2.7 km | MPC · JPL |
| 330485 | 2007 GB_{44} | — | April 14, 2007 | Mount Lemmon | Mount Lemmon Survey | · | 2.3 km | MPC · JPL |
| 330486 | 2007 GV_{44} | — | April 14, 2007 | Kitt Peak | Spacewatch | EOS | 1.7 km | MPC · JPL |
| 330487 | 2007 GB_{45} | — | April 14, 2007 | Kitt Peak | Spacewatch | · | 2.0 km | MPC · JPL |
| 330488 | 2007 GC_{55} | — | April 15, 2007 | Kitt Peak | Spacewatch | · | 3.4 km | MPC · JPL |
| 330489 | 2007 GS_{63} | — | April 15, 2007 | Kitt Peak | Spacewatch | · | 2.0 km | MPC · JPL |
| 330490 | 2007 GZ_{72} | — | April 15, 2007 | Catalina | CSS | · | 4.7 km | MPC · JPL |
| 330491 | 2007 GL_{75} | — | April 14, 2007 | Kitt Peak | Spacewatch | EOS | 2.0 km | MPC · JPL |
| 330492 | 2007 HM_{1} | — | April 16, 2007 | Socorro | LINEAR | ADE | 2.2 km | MPC · JPL |
| 330493 | 2007 HJ_{14} | — | April 15, 2007 | Kitt Peak | Spacewatch | · | 1.8 km | MPC · JPL |
| 330494 | 2007 HO_{16} | — | April 16, 2007 | Mount Lemmon | Mount Lemmon Survey | · | 1.8 km | MPC · JPL |
| 330495 | 2007 HO_{24} | — | April 18, 2007 | Kitt Peak | Spacewatch | · | 2.0 km | MPC · JPL |
| 330496 | 2007 HL_{56} | — | April 22, 2007 | Kitt Peak | Spacewatch | EOS | 2.4 km | MPC · JPL |
| 330497 | 2007 JS_{3} | — | April 25, 2007 | Kitt Peak | Spacewatch | · | 2.0 km | MPC · JPL |
| 330498 | 2007 KY_{1} | — | May 18, 2007 | Tiki | S. F. Hönig, Teamo, N. | · | 2.7 km | MPC · JPL |
| 330499 | 2007 LT_{7} | — | June 8, 2007 | Kitt Peak | Spacewatch | · | 2.2 km | MPC · JPL |
| 330500 | 2007 LX_{9} | — | June 9, 2007 | Kitt Peak | Spacewatch | · | 2.1 km | MPC · JPL |

== 330501–330600 ==
back to top

| Designation | | | Discovery | | | Properties | | Ref |
| Permanent | Provisional | Named after | Date | Site | Discoverer(s) | Category | Diam. | Ref |
|---|---|---|---|---|---|---|---|---|
| 330501 | 2007 LE_{13} | — | June 10, 2007 | Kitt Peak | Spacewatch | · | 1.8 km | MPC · JPL |
| 330502 | 2007 LK_{13} | — | June 10, 2007 | Kitt Peak | Spacewatch | · | 2.7 km | MPC · JPL |
| 330503 | 2007 LH_{17} | — | June 10, 2007 | Kitt Peak | Spacewatch | · | 2.8 km | MPC · JPL |
| 330504 | 2007 LL_{17} | — | June 10, 2007 | Kitt Peak | Spacewatch | EMA | 4.1 km | MPC · JPL |
| 330505 | 2007 LT_{17} | — | June 10, 2007 | Kitt Peak | Spacewatch | · | 3.3 km | MPC · JPL |
| 330506 | 2007 LX_{18} | — | June 9, 2007 | Catalina | CSS | · | 2.7 km | MPC · JPL |
| 330507 | 2007 LE_{26} | — | June 14, 2007 | Kitt Peak | Spacewatch | · | 3.7 km | MPC · JPL |
| 330508 | 2007 LV_{28} | — | June 15, 2007 | Catalina | CSS | · | 4.1 km | MPC · JPL |
| 330509 | 2007 MX_{1} | — | June 18, 2007 | Kitt Peak | Spacewatch | · | 2.1 km | MPC · JPL |
| 330510 | 2007 MR_{7} | — | June 18, 2007 | Kitt Peak | Spacewatch | · | 4.1 km | MPC · JPL |
| 330511 | 2007 NJ_{3} | — | July 14, 2007 | Dauban | Chante-Perdrix | · | 3.0 km | MPC · JPL |
| 330512 | 2007 NO_{4} | — | July 15, 2007 | Črni Vrh | Skvarč, J. | · | 7.1 km | MPC · JPL |
| 330513 | 2007 RX_{16} | — | September 12, 2007 | Lulin | LUSS | EOS | 2.8 km | MPC · JPL |
| 330514 | 2007 RB_{84} | — | September 10, 2007 | Kitt Peak | Spacewatch | T_{j} (2.98) · 3:2 · SHU | 8.3 km | MPC · JPL |
| 330515 | 2007 RQ_{275} | — | September 8, 2007 | Siding Spring | SSS | H | 770 m | MPC · JPL |
| 330516 | 2007 RZ_{302} | — | September 14, 2007 | Anderson Mesa | LONEOS | 3:2 · SHU | 7.0 km | MPC · JPL |
| 330517 | 2007 RC_{311} | — | September 2, 2007 | Siding Spring | SSS | · | 4.2 km | MPC · JPL |
| 330518 | 2007 SH_{5} | — | September 18, 2007 | Socorro | LINEAR | · | 1.0 km | MPC · JPL |
| 330519 | 2007 TC_{49} | — | October 4, 2007 | Kitt Peak | Spacewatch | · | 570 m | MPC · JPL |
| 330520 | 2007 TV_{84} | — | October 8, 2007 | Catalina | CSS | · | 3.3 km | MPC · JPL |
| 330521 | 2007 TC_{109} | — | October 7, 2007 | Catalina | CSS | · | 700 m | MPC · JPL |
| 330522 | 2007 TO_{127} | — | October 6, 2007 | Kitt Peak | Spacewatch | 3:2 · SHU | 5.7 km | MPC · JPL |
| 330523 | 2007 TJ_{156} | — | October 9, 2007 | Socorro | LINEAR | 3:2 | 8.5 km | MPC · JPL |
| 330524 | 2007 TL_{216} | — | October 7, 2007 | Kitt Peak | Spacewatch | · | 860 m | MPC · JPL |
| 330525 | 2007 TH_{234} | — | October 8, 2007 | Kitt Peak | Spacewatch | PHO | 930 m | MPC · JPL |
| 330526 | 2007 TL_{245} | — | October 8, 2007 | Mount Lemmon | Mount Lemmon Survey | T_{j} (2.99) · 3:2 · SHU | 7.1 km | MPC · JPL |
| 330527 | 2007 TT_{306} | — | October 8, 2007 | Mount Lemmon | Mount Lemmon Survey | · | 1.7 km | MPC · JPL |
| 330528 | 2007 UC_{47} | — | October 10, 2007 | Catalina | CSS | HIL · 3:2 | 8.2 km | MPC · JPL |
| 330529 | 2007 VA_{18} | — | November 1, 2007 | Mount Lemmon | Mount Lemmon Survey | NYS | 1.3 km | MPC · JPL |
| 330530 | 2007 VW_{226} | — | November 11, 2007 | Mount Lemmon | Mount Lemmon Survey | · | 1.0 km | MPC · JPL |
| 330531 | 2007 VD_{273} | — | November 12, 2007 | Catalina | CSS | · | 660 m | MPC · JPL |
| 330532 | 2007 WW_{14} | — | November 18, 2007 | Mount Lemmon | Mount Lemmon Survey | · | 590 m | MPC · JPL |
| 330533 | 2007 XZ_{15} | — | December 8, 2007 | La Sagra | OAM | · | 830 m | MPC · JPL |
| 330534 | 2007 XR_{32} | — | December 15, 2007 | Kitt Peak | Spacewatch | · | 1.1 km | MPC · JPL |
| 330535 | 2007 YL_{42} | — | December 30, 2007 | Catalina | CSS | · | 840 m | MPC · JPL |
| 330536 | 2007 YM_{62} | — | December 30, 2007 | Kitt Peak | Spacewatch | · | 680 m | MPC · JPL |
| 330537 | 2007 YB_{65} | — | December 31, 2007 | Kitt Peak | Spacewatch | · | 670 m | MPC · JPL |
| 330538 | 2007 YK_{68} | — | December 31, 2007 | Kitt Peak | Spacewatch | · | 870 m | MPC · JPL |
| 330539 | 2007 YL_{72} | — | December 18, 2007 | Mount Lemmon | Mount Lemmon Survey | · | 920 m | MPC · JPL |
| 330540 | 2008 AC_{3} | — | January 7, 2008 | Lulin | LUSS | · | 2.4 km | MPC · JPL |
| 330541 | 2008 AK_{9} | — | January 10, 2008 | Mount Lemmon | Mount Lemmon Survey | · | 700 m | MPC · JPL |
| 330542 | 2008 AH_{16} | — | January 10, 2008 | Mount Lemmon | Mount Lemmon Survey | · | 750 m | MPC · JPL |
| 330543 | 2008 AR_{55} | — | November 8, 2007 | Mount Lemmon | Mount Lemmon Survey | · | 900 m | MPC · JPL |
| 330544 | 2008 AZ_{63} | — | January 11, 2008 | Kitt Peak | Spacewatch | · | 650 m | MPC · JPL |
| 330545 | 2008 AH_{65} | — | January 11, 2008 | Mount Lemmon | Mount Lemmon Survey | NYS | 1.1 km | MPC · JPL |
| 330546 | 2008 AC_{70} | — | January 12, 2008 | Mount Lemmon | Mount Lemmon Survey | · | 1.1 km | MPC · JPL |
| 330547 | 2008 AK_{72} | — | January 1, 2008 | Kitt Peak | Spacewatch | · | 780 m | MPC · JPL |
| 330548 | 2008 AC_{89} | — | November 4, 2007 | Mount Lemmon | Mount Lemmon Survey | · | 710 m | MPC · JPL |
| 330549 | 2008 AY_{95} | — | December 18, 2007 | Mount Lemmon | Mount Lemmon Survey | · | 1.3 km | MPC · JPL |
| 330550 | 2008 AW_{99} | — | January 14, 2008 | Kitt Peak | Spacewatch | · | 710 m | MPC · JPL |
| 330551 | 2008 AF_{105} | — | November 3, 2007 | Mount Lemmon | Mount Lemmon Survey | · | 730 m | MPC · JPL |
| 330552 | 2008 BV_{9} | — | January 16, 2008 | Kitt Peak | Spacewatch | · | 960 m | MPC · JPL |
| 330553 | 2008 BN_{15} | — | January 28, 2008 | Lulin | LUSS | · | 600 m | MPC · JPL |
| 330554 | 2008 BN_{17} | — | January 30, 2008 | Catalina | CSS | · | 3.4 km | MPC · JPL |
| 330555 | 2008 BA_{19} | — | January 11, 2008 | Kitt Peak | Spacewatch | · | 750 m | MPC · JPL |
| 330556 | 2008 BX_{25} | — | January 1, 2008 | Kitt Peak | Spacewatch | · | 950 m | MPC · JPL |
| 330557 | 2008 BE_{30} | — | January 30, 2008 | Catalina | CSS | · | 830 m | MPC · JPL |
| 330558 | 2008 BH_{37} | — | January 31, 2008 | Mount Lemmon | Mount Lemmon Survey | · | 840 m | MPC · JPL |
| 330559 | 2008 BQ_{39} | — | January 30, 2008 | Catalina | CSS | · | 690 m | MPC · JPL |
| 330560 | 2008 BO_{45} | — | March 30, 2005 | Catalina | CSS | · | 1.0 km | MPC · JPL |
| 330561 | 2008 CT_{5} | — | February 6, 2008 | Socorro | LINEAR | BAR | 1.4 km | MPC · JPL |
| 330562 | 2008 CG_{14} | — | January 16, 2004 | Kitt Peak | Spacewatch | · | 1.1 km | MPC · JPL |
| 330563 | 2008 CB_{17} | — | February 3, 2008 | Kitt Peak | Spacewatch | MAS | 690 m | MPC · JPL |
| 330564 | 2008 CN_{21} | — | February 7, 2008 | Kitt Peak | Spacewatch | · | 2.0 km | MPC · JPL |
| 330565 | 2008 CC_{25} | — | February 1, 2008 | Kitt Peak | Spacewatch | NYS | 880 m | MPC · JPL |
| 330566 | 2008 CR_{35} | — | February 2, 2008 | Kitt Peak | Spacewatch | · | 1.3 km | MPC · JPL |
| 330567 | 2008 CP_{40} | — | February 2, 2008 | Kitt Peak | Spacewatch | · | 1.1 km | MPC · JPL |
| 330568 | 2008 CR_{42} | — | February 2, 2008 | Kitt Peak | Spacewatch | · | 830 m | MPC · JPL |
| 330569 | 2008 CU_{46} | — | February 2, 2008 | Kitt Peak | Spacewatch | · | 900 m | MPC · JPL |
| 330570 | 2008 CR_{47} | — | February 3, 2008 | Kitt Peak | Spacewatch | · | 970 m | MPC · JPL |
| 330571 | 2008 CC_{48} | — | February 3, 2008 | Catalina | CSS | · | 1.5 km | MPC · JPL |
| 330572 | 2008 CZ_{49} | — | February 6, 2008 | Catalina | CSS | · | 1.1 km | MPC · JPL |
| 330573 | 2008 CN_{65} | — | February 8, 2008 | Kitt Peak | Spacewatch | (40134) | 3.4 km | MPC · JPL |
| 330574 | 2008 CZ_{68} | — | February 7, 2008 | Bergisch Gladbach | W. Bickel | · | 620 m | MPC · JPL |
| 330575 | 2008 CW_{73} | — | February 7, 2008 | Kitt Peak | Spacewatch | NYS | 910 m | MPC · JPL |
| 330576 | 2008 CC_{76} | — | February 3, 2008 | Kitt Peak | Spacewatch | · | 1.5 km | MPC · JPL |
| 330577 | 2008 CQ_{83} | — | February 7, 2008 | Kitt Peak | Spacewatch | NYS | 1.0 km | MPC · JPL |
| 330578 | 2008 CS_{88} | — | February 7, 2008 | Mount Lemmon | Mount Lemmon Survey | · | 1.3 km | MPC · JPL |
| 330579 | 2008 CK_{90} | — | February 8, 2008 | Catalina | CSS | (2076) | 740 m | MPC · JPL |
| 330580 | 2008 CU_{95} | — | February 8, 2008 | Kitt Peak | Spacewatch | · | 990 m | MPC · JPL |
| 330581 | 2008 CE_{108} | — | February 9, 2008 | Catalina | CSS | · | 980 m | MPC · JPL |
| 330582 | 2008 CY_{108} | — | February 9, 2008 | Kitt Peak | Spacewatch | · | 1.3 km | MPC · JPL |
| 330583 | 2008 CZ_{120} | — | February 6, 2008 | Catalina | CSS | V | 830 m | MPC · JPL |
| 330584 | 2008 CP_{123} | — | February 7, 2008 | Mount Lemmon | Mount Lemmon Survey | · | 740 m | MPC · JPL |
| 330585 | 2008 CQ_{129} | — | February 8, 2008 | Kitt Peak | Spacewatch | · | 1.5 km | MPC · JPL |
| 330586 | 2008 CH_{135} | — | January 15, 2008 | Mount Lemmon | Mount Lemmon Survey | · | 910 m | MPC · JPL |
| 330587 | 2008 CU_{144} | — | February 9, 2008 | Kitt Peak | Spacewatch | ERI | 1.7 km | MPC · JPL |
| 330588 | 2008 CW_{154} | — | February 9, 2008 | Kitt Peak | Spacewatch | · | 900 m | MPC · JPL |
| 330589 | 2008 CB_{155} | — | February 2, 2008 | Kitt Peak | Spacewatch | · | 1.2 km | MPC · JPL |
| 330590 | 2008 CT_{156} | — | February 9, 2008 | Kitt Peak | Spacewatch | · | 850 m | MPC · JPL |
| 330591 | 2008 CA_{158} | — | February 9, 2008 | Catalina | CSS | · | 890 m | MPC · JPL |
| 330592 | 2008 CJ_{162} | — | February 10, 2008 | Anderson Mesa | LONEOS | (2076) | 960 m | MPC · JPL |
| 330593 | 2008 CU_{188} | — | February 13, 2008 | Catalina | CSS | · | 2.4 km | MPC · JPL |
| 330594 | 2008 CB_{196} | — | February 7, 2008 | Mount Lemmon | Mount Lemmon Survey | · | 780 m | MPC · JPL |
| 330595 | 2008 CU_{209} | — | February 6, 2008 | Catalina | CSS | · | 1.1 km | MPC · JPL |
| 330596 | 2008 DU_{2} | — | February 24, 2008 | Kitt Peak | Spacewatch | · | 720 m | MPC · JPL |
| 330597 | 2008 DO_{6} | — | February 24, 2008 | Mount Lemmon | Mount Lemmon Survey | · | 690 m | MPC · JPL |
| 330598 | 2008 DZ_{9} | — | February 26, 2008 | Kitt Peak | Spacewatch | · | 820 m | MPC · JPL |
| 330599 | 2008 DY_{15} | — | February 27, 2008 | Catalina | CSS | · | 1.3 km | MPC · JPL |
| 330600 | 2008 DR_{17} | — | February 24, 2008 | Kitt Peak | Spacewatch | V | 730 m | MPC · JPL |

== 330601–330700 ==
back to top

| Designation | | | Discovery | | | Properties | | Ref |
| Permanent | Provisional | Named after | Date | Site | Discoverer(s) | Category | Diam. | Ref |
|---|---|---|---|---|---|---|---|---|
| 330601 | 2008 DG_{19} | — | January 15, 2008 | Mount Lemmon | Mount Lemmon Survey | · | 1.2 km | MPC · JPL |
| 330602 | 2008 DL_{32} | — | February 27, 2008 | Kitt Peak | Spacewatch | · | 790 m | MPC · JPL |
| 330603 | 2008 DS_{32} | — | February 27, 2008 | Kitt Peak | Spacewatch | NYS | 1.3 km | MPC · JPL |
| 330604 | 2008 DJ_{33} | — | February 11, 2008 | Mount Lemmon | Mount Lemmon Survey | · | 830 m | MPC · JPL |
| 330605 | 2008 DA_{37} | — | February 27, 2008 | Catalina | CSS | · | 1.5 km | MPC · JPL |
| 330606 | 2008 DF_{48} | — | February 28, 2008 | Mount Lemmon | Mount Lemmon Survey | MAS | 950 m | MPC · JPL |
| 330607 | 2008 DC_{54} | — | February 26, 2008 | Anderson Mesa | LONEOS | · | 1.2 km | MPC · JPL |
| 330608 | 2008 DV_{65} | — | February 28, 2008 | Mount Lemmon | Mount Lemmon Survey | · | 1.3 km | MPC · JPL |
| 330609 | 2008 DP_{67} | — | February 29, 2008 | Kitt Peak | Spacewatch | · | 1.0 km | MPC · JPL |
| 330610 | 2008 DD_{70} | — | February 28, 2008 | Catalina | CSS | · | 990 m | MPC · JPL |
| 330611 | 2008 DU_{78} | — | May 24, 2001 | Cerro Tololo | Deep Ecliptic Survey | MAS | 640 m | MPC · JPL |
| 330612 | 2008 DJ_{79} | — | February 27, 2008 | Catalina | CSS | · | 1.2 km | MPC · JPL |
| 330613 | 2008 DT_{80} | — | February 18, 2008 | Mount Lemmon | Mount Lemmon Survey | NYS | 1.2 km | MPC · JPL |
| 330614 | 2008 DK_{81} | — | February 27, 2008 | Kitt Peak | Spacewatch | MAS | 750 m | MPC · JPL |
| 330615 | 2008 DO_{82} | — | February 28, 2008 | Kitt Peak | Spacewatch | NYS | 890 m | MPC · JPL |
| 330616 | 2008 DN_{85} | — | February 28, 2008 | Kitt Peak | Spacewatch | MAS | 780 m | MPC · JPL |
| 330617 | 2008 DQ_{88} | — | February 26, 2008 | Kitt Peak | Spacewatch | (2076) | 1.1 km | MPC · JPL |
| 330618 | 2008 ET_{4} | — | March 2, 2008 | Mount Lemmon | Mount Lemmon Survey | · | 1.1 km | MPC · JPL |
| 330619 | 2008 EW_{7} | — | March 1, 2008 | La Sagra | OAM | NYS | 1.5 km | MPC · JPL |
| 330620 | 2008 EC_{10} | — | February 3, 2008 | Kitt Peak | Spacewatch | · | 880 m | MPC · JPL |
| 330621 | 2008 EB_{19} | — | March 2, 2008 | Catalina | CSS | · | 1.1 km | MPC · JPL |
| 330622 | 2008 EP_{26} | — | March 4, 2008 | Kitt Peak | Spacewatch | · | 1.3 km | MPC · JPL |
| 330623 | 2008 EX_{33} | — | March 1, 2008 | Mount Lemmon | Mount Lemmon Survey | · | 1.0 km | MPC · JPL |
| 330624 | 2008 EF_{34} | — | March 2, 2008 | Catalina | CSS | · | 1.0 km | MPC · JPL |
| 330625 | 2008 EJ_{39} | — | March 4, 2008 | Kitt Peak | Spacewatch | HOF | 4.0 km | MPC · JPL |
| 330626 | 2008 EW_{54} | — | March 6, 2008 | Kitt Peak | Spacewatch | · | 1.5 km | MPC · JPL |
| 330627 | 2008 ED_{74} | — | March 7, 2008 | Kitt Peak | Spacewatch | · | 1.6 km | MPC · JPL |
| 330628 | 2008 EW_{77} | — | March 7, 2008 | Kitt Peak | Spacewatch | · | 1.3 km | MPC · JPL |
| 330629 | 2008 EJ_{78} | — | March 7, 2008 | Kitt Peak | Spacewatch | NYS | 1.2 km | MPC · JPL |
| 330630 | 2008 EK_{78} | — | March 7, 2008 | Kitt Peak | Spacewatch | · | 1.1 km | MPC · JPL |
| 330631 | 2008 ES_{82} | — | December 18, 2007 | Mount Lemmon | Mount Lemmon Survey | · | 1.4 km | MPC · JPL |
| 330632 | 2008 EV_{83} | — | March 8, 2008 | Mount Lemmon | Mount Lemmon Survey | NYS | 1.1 km | MPC · JPL |
| 330633 | 2008 EK_{122} | — | March 9, 2008 | Kitt Peak | Spacewatch | · | 3.5 km | MPC · JPL |
| 330634 Boico | 2008 EY_{131} | Boico | March 11, 2008 | La Silla | EURONEAR | SUL | 1.8 km | MPC · JPL |
| 330635 | 2008 EG_{136} | — | March 11, 2008 | Kitt Peak | Spacewatch | · | 1.1 km | MPC · JPL |
| 330636 | 2008 EW_{147} | — | March 1, 2008 | Kitt Peak | Spacewatch | · | 1.3 km | MPC · JPL |
| 330637 | 2008 EM_{152} | — | March 10, 2008 | Kitt Peak | Spacewatch | V | 580 m | MPC · JPL |
| 330638 | 2008 EX_{164} | — | July 31, 2005 | Palomar | NEAT | · | 1.3 km | MPC · JPL |
| 330639 | 2008 FY | — | February 13, 2008 | Kitt Peak | Spacewatch | · | 1.2 km | MPC · JPL |
| 330640 Yangxuejun | 2008 FX_{2} | Yangxuejun | March 3, 2008 | XuYi | PMO NEO Survey Program | · | 1.0 km | MPC · JPL |
| 330641 | 2008 FP_{25} | — | March 27, 2008 | Kitt Peak | Spacewatch | · | 1.0 km | MPC · JPL |
| 330642 | 2008 FQ_{28} | — | March 28, 2008 | Kitt Peak | Spacewatch | · | 1.7 km | MPC · JPL |
| 330643 | 2008 FJ_{37} | — | March 28, 2008 | Kitt Peak | Spacewatch | NEM | 2.4 km | MPC · JPL |
| 330644 | 2008 FB_{39} | — | March 28, 2008 | Kitt Peak | Spacewatch | · | 1.6 km | MPC · JPL |
| 330645 | 2008 FF_{40} | — | March 28, 2008 | Kitt Peak | Spacewatch | MAS | 900 m | MPC · JPL |
| 330646 | 2008 FL_{40} | — | March 28, 2008 | Kitt Peak | Spacewatch | · | 1.3 km | MPC · JPL |
| 330647 | 2008 FU_{52} | — | March 28, 2008 | Mount Lemmon | Mount Lemmon Survey | · | 1.4 km | MPC · JPL |
| 330648 | 2008 FB_{56} | — | March 28, 2008 | Mount Lemmon | Mount Lemmon Survey | CLA | 2.2 km | MPC · JPL |
| 330649 | 2008 FX_{60} | — | March 29, 2008 | Mount Lemmon | Mount Lemmon Survey | · | 1.2 km | MPC · JPL |
| 330650 | 2008 FG_{78} | — | March 27, 2008 | Mount Lemmon | Mount Lemmon Survey | · | 960 m | MPC · JPL |
| 330651 | 2008 FA_{85} | — | March 28, 2008 | Mount Lemmon | Mount Lemmon Survey | NYS | 900 m | MPC · JPL |
| 330652 | 2008 FB_{89} | — | March 28, 2008 | Mount Lemmon | Mount Lemmon Survey | MAS | 950 m | MPC · JPL |
| 330653 | 2008 FV_{109} | — | March 31, 2008 | Mount Lemmon | Mount Lemmon Survey | · | 1.1 km | MPC · JPL |
| 330654 | 2008 FA_{113} | — | March 31, 2008 | Kitt Peak | Spacewatch | · | 1.1 km | MPC · JPL |
| 330655 | 2008 FH_{113} | — | March 31, 2008 | Kitt Peak | Spacewatch | · | 1.4 km | MPC · JPL |
| 330656 | 2008 FW_{125} | — | March 31, 2008 | Mount Lemmon | Mount Lemmon Survey | MAS | 760 m | MPC · JPL |
| 330657 | 2008 FL_{128} | — | March 28, 2008 | Mount Lemmon | Mount Lemmon Survey | · | 1.1 km | MPC · JPL |
| 330658 | 2008 FG_{132} | — | March 26, 2008 | Mount Lemmon | Mount Lemmon Survey | · | 1.0 km | MPC · JPL |
| 330659 | 2008 GG_{2} | — | April 5, 2008 | Socorro | LINEAR | AMO | 90 m | MPC · JPL |
| 330660 | 2008 GS_{60} | — | April 5, 2008 | Catalina | CSS | · | 2.1 km | MPC · JPL |
| 330661 | 2008 GW_{70} | — | April 7, 2008 | Kitt Peak | Spacewatch | · | 2.0 km | MPC · JPL |
| 330662 | 2008 GC_{73} | — | April 7, 2008 | Mount Lemmon | Mount Lemmon Survey | · | 1.7 km | MPC · JPL |
| 330663 | 2008 GS_{73} | — | April 7, 2008 | Mount Lemmon | Mount Lemmon Survey | V | 630 m | MPC · JPL |
| 330664 | 2008 GC_{83} | — | April 8, 2008 | Kitt Peak | Spacewatch | · | 1.7 km | MPC · JPL |
| 330665 | 2008 GR_{87} | — | April 5, 2008 | Mount Lemmon | Mount Lemmon Survey | · | 2.3 km | MPC · JPL |
| 330666 | 2008 GQ_{90} | — | April 6, 2008 | Mount Lemmon | Mount Lemmon Survey | · | 870 m | MPC · JPL |
| 330667 | 2008 GL_{95} | — | April 8, 2008 | Kitt Peak | Spacewatch | · | 1.6 km | MPC · JPL |
| 330668 | 2008 GZ_{98} | — | September 30, 2006 | Mount Lemmon | Mount Lemmon Survey | · | 1.3 km | MPC · JPL |
| 330669 | 2008 GE_{101} | — | April 9, 2008 | Kitt Peak | Spacewatch | · | 960 m | MPC · JPL |
| 330670 | 2008 GP_{122} | — | November 24, 2006 | Mount Lemmon | Mount Lemmon Survey | · | 1.1 km | MPC · JPL |
| 330671 | 2008 GV_{130} | — | April 6, 2008 | Mount Lemmon | Mount Lemmon Survey | · | 1.4 km | MPC · JPL |
| 330672 | 2008 GE_{132} | — | April 8, 2008 | Kitt Peak | Spacewatch | · | 1.8 km | MPC · JPL |
| 330673 | 2008 GM_{137} | — | April 6, 2008 | Kitt Peak | Spacewatch | · | 1.4 km | MPC · JPL |
| 330674 | 2008 GN_{143} | — | April 4, 2008 | Mount Lemmon | Mount Lemmon Survey | · | 1.7 km | MPC · JPL |
| 330675 | 2008 HK_{4} | — | April 28, 2008 | La Sagra | OAM | · | 1.6 km | MPC · JPL |
| 330676 | 2008 HV_{5} | — | April 24, 2008 | Kitt Peak | Spacewatch | NYS | 1.0 km | MPC · JPL |
| 330677 | 2008 HX_{5} | — | April 24, 2008 | Kitt Peak | Spacewatch | MAS | 900 m | MPC · JPL |
| 330678 | 2008 HY_{17} | — | April 1, 2008 | Mount Lemmon | Mount Lemmon Survey | · | 1.5 km | MPC · JPL |
| 330679 | 2008 HF_{23} | — | April 27, 2008 | Kitt Peak | Spacewatch | AST | 1.6 km | MPC · JPL |
| 330680 | 2008 HV_{25} | — | April 6, 2008 | Mount Lemmon | Mount Lemmon Survey | · | 1.6 km | MPC · JPL |
| 330681 | 2008 HF_{37} | — | April 30, 2008 | Mount Lemmon | Mount Lemmon Survey | · | 1.5 km | MPC · JPL |
| 330682 | 2008 HG_{38} | — | March 10, 2008 | Kitt Peak | Spacewatch | · | 1.7 km | MPC · JPL |
| 330683 | 2008 HE_{39} | — | April 26, 2008 | Mount Lemmon | Mount Lemmon Survey | NYS | 1.1 km | MPC · JPL |
| 330684 | 2008 HJ_{46} | — | April 28, 2008 | Kitt Peak | Spacewatch | NYS | 1.3 km | MPC · JPL |
| 330685 | 2008 HM_{56} | — | April 3, 2008 | Kitt Peak | Spacewatch | MAS | 690 m | MPC · JPL |
| 330686 | 2008 HF_{61} | — | April 30, 2008 | Kitt Peak | Spacewatch | · | 1.3 km | MPC · JPL |
| 330687 | 2008 HD_{67} | — | April 25, 2008 | Kitt Peak | Spacewatch | · | 1.4 km | MPC · JPL |
| 330688 | 2008 HR_{69} | — | April 29, 2008 | Mount Lemmon | Mount Lemmon Survey | THM | 2.5 km | MPC · JPL |
| 330689 | 2008 JP_{1} | — | May 2, 2008 | Mount Lemmon | Mount Lemmon Survey | NYS | 930 m | MPC · JPL |
| 330690 | 2008 JX_{2} | — | May 3, 2008 | Dauban | Kugel, F. | · | 1.7 km | MPC · JPL |
| 330691 | 2008 JT_{11} | — | May 3, 2008 | Kitt Peak | Spacewatch | · | 1.9 km | MPC · JPL |
| 330692 | 2008 JG_{23} | — | May 7, 2008 | Kitt Peak | Spacewatch | · | 1.1 km | MPC · JPL |
| 330693 | 2008 JL_{28} | — | May 8, 2008 | Kitt Peak | Spacewatch | · | 1.5 km | MPC · JPL |
| 330694 | 2008 JP_{28} | — | May 8, 2008 | Kitt Peak | Spacewatch | · | 930 m | MPC · JPL |
| 330695 | 2008 KF_{2} | — | May 26, 2008 | Kitt Peak | Spacewatch | · | 1.8 km | MPC · JPL |
| 330696 | 2008 KC_{9} | — | May 27, 2008 | Kitt Peak | Spacewatch | · | 1.2 km | MPC · JPL |
| 330697 | 2008 KZ_{11} | — | May 29, 2008 | Wrightwood | J. W. Young | · | 3.5 km | MPC · JPL |
| 330698 | 2008 KT_{12} | — | May 27, 2008 | Kitt Peak | Spacewatch | · | 2.0 km | MPC · JPL |
| 330699 | 2008 KU_{13} | — | May 27, 2008 | Kitt Peak | Spacewatch | · | 2.0 km | MPC · JPL |
| 330700 | 2008 KZ_{17} | — | May 28, 2008 | Kitt Peak | Spacewatch | · | 1.1 km | MPC · JPL |

== 330701–330800 ==
back to top

| Designation | | | Discovery | | | Properties | | Ref |
| Permanent | Provisional | Named after | Date | Site | Discoverer(s) | Category | Diam. | Ref |
|---|---|---|---|---|---|---|---|---|
| 330701 | 2008 KA_{30} | — | May 29, 2008 | Kitt Peak | Spacewatch | · | 1.7 km | MPC · JPL |
| 330702 | 2008 LW_{4} | — | June 3, 2008 | Mount Lemmon | Mount Lemmon Survey | · | 3.5 km | MPC · JPL |
| 330703 | 2008 LR_{10} | — | June 6, 2008 | Kitt Peak | Spacewatch | · | 1.5 km | MPC · JPL |
| 330704 | 2008 LX_{13} | — | June 7, 2008 | Catalina | CSS | · | 2.4 km | MPC · JPL |
| 330705 | 2008 LR_{15} | — | June 9, 2008 | Kitt Peak | Spacewatch | · | 1.3 km | MPC · JPL |
| 330706 | 2008 MY | — | June 27, 2008 | Siding Spring | SSS | · | 1.9 km | MPC · JPL |
| 330707 | 2008 NC_{5} | — | July 3, 2008 | Siding Spring | SSS | · | 2.3 km | MPC · JPL |
| 330708 | 2008 OS | — | July 25, 2008 | La Sagra | OAM | JUN | 1.4 km | MPC · JPL |
| 330709 | 2008 OV_{7} | — | July 28, 2008 | La Sagra | OAM | · | 3.6 km | MPC · JPL |
| 330710 | 2008 OD_{11} | — | September 18, 2004 | Socorro | LINEAR | · | 1.9 km | MPC · JPL |
| 330711 | 2008 OM_{14} | — | December 24, 2005 | Kitt Peak | Spacewatch | · | 2.6 km | MPC · JPL |
| 330712 Rhodescolossus | 2008 PR_{1} | Rhodescolossus | August 3, 2008 | Vallemare Borbona | V. S. Casulli | · | 2.0 km | MPC · JPL |
| 330713 | 2008 PC_{8} | — | August 5, 2008 | La Sagra | OAM | · | 2.6 km | MPC · JPL |
| 330714 | 2008 PB_{10} | — | August 5, 2008 | La Sagra | OAM | BRA | 1.9 km | MPC · JPL |
| 330715 | 2008 PO_{14} | — | August 10, 2008 | Dauban | Kugel, F. | · | 3.4 km | MPC · JPL |
| 330716 | 2008 PS_{20} | — | August 5, 2008 | Siding Spring | SSS | BRA | 2.2 km | MPC · JPL |
| 330717 | 2008 PZ_{20} | — | August 2, 2008 | Siding Spring | SSS | · | 2.7 km | MPC · JPL |
| 330718 | 2008 QT_{4} | — | August 20, 2008 | Kitt Peak | Spacewatch | · | 2.6 km | MPC · JPL |
| 330719 | 2008 QH_{6} | — | July 28, 2008 | Mount Lemmon | Mount Lemmon Survey | · | 4.0 km | MPC · JPL |
| 330720 | 2008 QR_{23} | — | August 30, 2008 | Bergisch Gladbach | W. Bickel | · | 2.6 km | MPC · JPL |
| 330721 | 2008 QZ_{25} | — | August 29, 2008 | La Sagra | OAM | · | 2.7 km | MPC · JPL |
| 330722 | 2008 QT_{34} | — | August 24, 2008 | La Sagra | OAM | · | 2.5 km | MPC · JPL |
| 330723 | 2008 QX_{43} | — | August 23, 2008 | Siding Spring | SSS | · | 3.3 km | MPC · JPL |
| 330724 | 2008 QZ_{46} | — | August 21, 2008 | Kitt Peak | Spacewatch | · | 2.1 km | MPC · JPL |
| 330725 | 2008 RM_{22} | — | September 3, 2008 | La Sagra | OAM | · | 3.4 km | MPC · JPL |
| 330726 | 2008 RE_{47} | — | September 2, 2008 | Kitt Peak | Spacewatch | · | 2.5 km | MPC · JPL |
| 330727 | 2008 RO_{74} | — | September 6, 2008 | Catalina | CSS | · | 2.3 km | MPC · JPL |
| 330728 | 2008 RA_{91} | — | September 6, 2008 | Mount Lemmon | Mount Lemmon Survey | · | 4.0 km | MPC · JPL |
| 330729 | 2008 RP_{95} | — | September 7, 2008 | Catalina | CSS | · | 2.2 km | MPC · JPL |
| 330730 | 2008 RK_{103} | — | September 5, 2008 | Kitt Peak | Spacewatch | · | 3.7 km | MPC · JPL |
| 330731 | 2008 RV_{112} | — | September 5, 2008 | Kitt Peak | Spacewatch | EOS | 2.1 km | MPC · JPL |
| 330732 | 2008 RH_{119} | — | September 4, 2008 | Kitt Peak | Spacewatch | · | 3.4 km | MPC · JPL |
| 330733 | 2008 RA_{137} | — | September 4, 2008 | Kitt Peak | Spacewatch | · | 3.8 km | MPC · JPL |
| 330734 | 2008 RE_{140} | — | February 8, 2002 | Kitt Peak | Deep Ecliptic Survey | KON | 2.4 km | MPC · JPL |
| 330735 | 2008 SB_{16} | — | September 4, 2008 | Kitt Peak | Spacewatch | · | 2.2 km | MPC · JPL |
| 330736 | 2008 SQ_{21} | — | September 19, 2008 | Kitt Peak | Spacewatch | · | 1.9 km | MPC · JPL |
| 330737 | 2008 SS_{25} | — | August 22, 2008 | Kitt Peak | Spacewatch | EOS | 1.9 km | MPC · JPL |
| 330738 | 2008 SS_{29} | — | September 4, 2008 | Kitt Peak | Spacewatch | · | 2.7 km | MPC · JPL |
| 330739 | 2008 SX_{30} | — | September 20, 2008 | Kitt Peak | Spacewatch | · | 4.7 km | MPC · JPL |
| 330740 | 2008 SN_{31} | — | September 20, 2008 | Kitt Peak | Spacewatch | · | 3.9 km | MPC · JPL |
| 330741 | 2008 ST_{34} | — | September 20, 2008 | Kitt Peak | Spacewatch | HYG | 2.7 km | MPC · JPL |
| 330742 | 2008 SH_{65} | — | September 21, 2008 | Mount Lemmon | Mount Lemmon Survey | · | 4.3 km | MPC · JPL |
| 330743 | 2008 SV_{86} | — | September 20, 2008 | Kitt Peak | Spacewatch | · | 4.4 km | MPC · JPL |
| 330744 | 2008 SZ_{91} | — | September 21, 2008 | Kitt Peak | Spacewatch | · | 2.6 km | MPC · JPL |
| 330745 | 2008 SW_{113} | — | September 22, 2008 | Kitt Peak | Spacewatch | VER | 4.6 km | MPC · JPL |
| 330746 | 2008 SC_{114} | — | September 22, 2008 | Kitt Peak | Spacewatch | · | 3.2 km | MPC · JPL |
| 330747 | 2008 SX_{121} | — | September 22, 2008 | Mount Lemmon | Mount Lemmon Survey | · | 3.2 km | MPC · JPL |
| 330748 | 2008 SE_{124} | — | September 22, 2008 | Mount Lemmon | Mount Lemmon Survey | EOS | 2.0 km | MPC · JPL |
| 330749 | 2008 SO_{131} | — | September 22, 2008 | Kitt Peak | Spacewatch | EOS | 3.1 km | MPC · JPL |
| 330750 | 2008 SD_{135} | — | September 23, 2008 | Catalina | CSS | · | 3.4 km | MPC · JPL |
| 330751 | 2008 SV_{145} | — | September 21, 2008 | Bergisch Gladbach | W. Bickel | · | 6.3 km | MPC · JPL |
| 330752 | 2008 SO_{147} | — | September 25, 2008 | Bergisch Gladbach | W. Bickel | · | 3.1 km | MPC · JPL |
| 330753 | 2008 ST_{148} | — | September 27, 2008 | Andrushivka | Andrushivka | · | 4.9 km | MPC · JPL |
| 330754 | 2008 SO_{149} | — | September 28, 2008 | Dauban | Kugel, F. | · | 2.9 km | MPC · JPL |
| 330755 | 2008 SA_{171} | — | September 21, 2008 | Mount Lemmon | Mount Lemmon Survey | · | 3.4 km | MPC · JPL |
| 330756 | 2008 SO_{178} | — | October 24, 2003 | Apache Point | SDSS | · | 3.5 km | MPC · JPL |
| 330757 | 2008 SE_{199} | — | September 26, 2008 | Mount Lemmon | Mount Lemmon Survey | EOS | 2.4 km | MPC · JPL |
| 330758 | 2008 SR_{199} | — | September 26, 2008 | Kitt Peak | Spacewatch | · | 2.1 km | MPC · JPL |
| 330759 | 2008 SO_{218} | — | September 30, 2008 | Mount Lemmon | Mount Lemmon Survey | damocloid · unusual | 12 km | MPC · JPL |
| 330760 | 2008 SQ_{253} | — | September 21, 2008 | Siding Spring | SSS | · | 2.4 km | MPC · JPL |
| 330761 | 2008 SR_{256} | — | September 21, 2008 | Kitt Peak | Spacewatch | · | 3.7 km | MPC · JPL |
| 330762 | 2008 SZ_{256} | — | September 21, 2008 | Catalina | CSS | EOS | 2.6 km | MPC · JPL |
| 330763 | 2008 SW_{259} | — | September 23, 2008 | Kitt Peak | Spacewatch | WIT | 1.3 km | MPC · JPL |
| 330764 | 2008 SR_{264} | — | September 25, 2008 | Kitt Peak | Spacewatch | CYB | 4.7 km | MPC · JPL |
| 330765 | 2008 SD_{269} | — | September 30, 2008 | Mount Lemmon | Mount Lemmon Survey | · | 2.9 km | MPC · JPL |
| 330766 | 2008 SL_{272} | — | September 23, 2008 | Mount Lemmon | Mount Lemmon Survey | AGN | 1.3 km | MPC · JPL |
| 330767 | 2008 ST_{273} | — | September 6, 2008 | Kitt Peak | Spacewatch | · | 2.0 km | MPC · JPL |
| 330768 | 2008 SE_{274} | — | September 28, 2008 | Socorro | LINEAR | · | 2.1 km | MPC · JPL |
| 330769 | 2008 SE_{296} | — | September 28, 2008 | Catalina | CSS | · | 4.5 km | MPC · JPL |
| 330770 | 2008 SU_{300} | — | September 23, 2008 | Socorro | LINEAR | · | 3.0 km | MPC · JPL |
| 330771 | 2008 SJ_{301} | — | September 23, 2008 | Socorro | LINEAR | · | 3.8 km | MPC · JPL |
| 330772 | 2008 TW_{1} | — | October 3, 2008 | Pla D'Arguines | R. Ferrando, M. Ferrando | HYG | 3.3 km | MPC · JPL |
| 330773 | 2008 TR_{3} | — | October 4, 2008 | Črni Vrh | Mikuž, H. | HYG | 3.7 km | MPC · JPL |
| 330774 | 2008 TA_{6} | — | October 3, 2008 | La Sagra | OAM | · | 2.2 km | MPC · JPL |
| 330775 | 2008 TL_{6} | — | October 3, 2008 | La Sagra | OAM | T_{j} (2.99) · EUP | 4.9 km | MPC · JPL |
| 330776 | 2008 TH_{31} | — | October 1, 2008 | Kitt Peak | Spacewatch | THM | 2.7 km | MPC · JPL |
| 330777 | 2008 TB_{37} | — | October 1, 2008 | Catalina | CSS | · | 4.8 km | MPC · JPL |
| 330778 | 2008 TH_{44} | — | October 1, 2008 | Mount Lemmon | Mount Lemmon Survey | · | 3.0 km | MPC · JPL |
| 330779 | 2008 TV_{48} | — | October 2, 2008 | Kitt Peak | Spacewatch | · | 2.3 km | MPC · JPL |
| 330780 | 2008 TZ_{54} | — | October 2, 2008 | Kitt Peak | Spacewatch | T_{j} (2.98) · 3:2 | 5.6 km | MPC · JPL |
| 330781 | 2008 TW_{61} | — | October 2, 2008 | Kitt Peak | Spacewatch | · | 3.9 km | MPC · JPL |
| 330782 | 2008 TE_{101} | — | September 9, 2008 | Mount Lemmon | Mount Lemmon Survey | · | 1.9 km | MPC · JPL |
| 330783 | 2008 TZ_{105} | — | October 6, 2008 | Mount Lemmon | Mount Lemmon Survey | · | 3.0 km | MPC · JPL |
| 330784 | 2008 TH_{122} | — | October 7, 2008 | Catalina | CSS | · | 2.8 km | MPC · JPL |
| 330785 | 2008 TE_{162} | — | October 10, 2008 | Catalina | CSS | · | 5.9 km | MPC · JPL |
| 330786 | 2008 TO_{177} | — | October 1, 2008 | Catalina | CSS | · | 4.6 km | MPC · JPL |
| 330787 | 2008 UX_{43} | — | October 20, 2008 | Mount Lemmon | Mount Lemmon Survey | · | 1.8 km | MPC · JPL |
| 330788 | 2008 UK_{75} | — | October 21, 2008 | Kitt Peak | Spacewatch | 3:2 | 5.6 km | MPC · JPL |
| 330789 | 2008 UN_{117} | — | October 22, 2008 | Kitt Peak | Spacewatch | · | 3.8 km | MPC · JPL |
| 330790 | 2008 UV_{130} | — | October 23, 2008 | Kitt Peak | Spacewatch | HYG | 2.9 km | MPC · JPL |
| 330791 | 2008 UQ_{136} | — | October 23, 2008 | Kitt Peak | Spacewatch | · | 4.5 km | MPC · JPL |
| 330792 | 2008 UO_{160} | — | October 23, 2008 | Kitt Peak | Spacewatch | · | 3.3 km | MPC · JPL |
| 330793 | 2008 UR_{174} | — | October 24, 2008 | Catalina | CSS | · | 3.5 km | MPC · JPL |
| 330794 | 2008 UW_{180} | — | October 24, 2008 | Kitt Peak | Spacewatch | EOS | 5.2 km | MPC · JPL |
| 330795 | 2008 UQ_{202} | — | October 26, 2008 | Socorro | LINEAR | · | 4.5 km | MPC · JPL |
| 330796 | 2008 UK_{205} | — | October 27, 2008 | Catalina | CSS | EUP | 6.4 km | MPC · JPL |
| 330797 | 2008 UA_{255} | — | October 27, 2008 | Mount Lemmon | Mount Lemmon Survey | · | 5.9 km | MPC · JPL |
| 330798 | 2008 UM_{255} | — | February 25, 2006 | Anderson Mesa | LONEOS | · | 4.7 km | MPC · JPL |
| 330799 | 2008 UE_{283} | — | March 26, 2006 | Mount Lemmon | Mount Lemmon Survey | THM | 3.1 km | MPC · JPL |
| 330800 | 2008 UL_{307} | — | October 30, 2008 | Catalina | CSS | · | 3.8 km | MPC · JPL |

== 330801–330900 ==
back to top

| Designation | | | Discovery | | | Properties | | Ref |
| Permanent | Provisional | Named after | Date | Site | Discoverer(s) | Category | Diam. | Ref |
|---|---|---|---|---|---|---|---|---|
| 330801 | 2008 UZ_{312} | — | October 30, 2008 | Kitt Peak | Spacewatch | URS | 3.9 km | MPC · JPL |
| 330802 | 2008 UV_{313} | — | October 30, 2008 | Mount Lemmon | Mount Lemmon Survey | · | 6.0 km | MPC · JPL |
| 330803 | 2008 UF_{331} | — | October 31, 2008 | Mount Lemmon | Mount Lemmon Survey | TIR | 3.5 km | MPC · JPL |
| 330804 | 2008 UU_{334} | — | October 20, 2008 | Kitt Peak | Spacewatch | · | 2.7 km | MPC · JPL |
| 330805 | 2008 UV_{344} | — | October 30, 2008 | Kitt Peak | Spacewatch | · | 2.5 km | MPC · JPL |
| 330806 | 2008 UW_{345} | — | October 26, 2008 | Siding Spring | SSS | · | 2.4 km | MPC · JPL |
| 330807 | 2008 UD_{361} | — | October 25, 2008 | Catalina | CSS | · | 4.5 km | MPC · JPL |
| 330808 | 2008 UU_{370} | — | October 26, 2008 | Mount Lemmon | Mount Lemmon Survey | · | 2.1 km | MPC · JPL |
| 330809 | 2008 VK_{14} | — | November 8, 2008 | Socorro | LINEAR | APO | 490 m | MPC · JPL |
| 330810 | 2008 VO_{21} | — | November 1, 2008 | Mount Lemmon | Mount Lemmon Survey | EMA | 4.9 km | MPC · JPL |
| 330811 | 2008 VK_{27} | — | November 2, 2008 | Kitt Peak | Spacewatch | · | 4.1 km | MPC · JPL |
| 330812 | 2008 VX_{34} | — | November 2, 2008 | Mount Lemmon | Mount Lemmon Survey | · | 3.6 km | MPC · JPL |
| 330813 | 2008 VZ_{49} | — | November 4, 2008 | Kitt Peak | Spacewatch | SYL · CYB | 4.5 km | MPC · JPL |
| 330814 | 2008 VK_{53} | — | November 6, 2008 | Catalina | CSS | EUP | 6.3 km | MPC · JPL |
| 330815 | 2008 VU_{65} | — | November 2, 2008 | Mount Lemmon | Mount Lemmon Survey | · | 4.8 km | MPC · JPL |
| 330816 | 2008 VG_{75} | — | November 2, 2008 | Catalina | CSS | · | 4.0 km | MPC · JPL |
| 330817 | 2008 WH | — | November 18, 2008 | Cordell-Lorenz | D. T. Durig | · | 3.7 km | MPC · JPL |
| 330818 | 2008 WN_{15} | — | November 17, 2008 | Kitt Peak | Spacewatch | · | 4.9 km | MPC · JPL |
| 330819 | 2008 WA_{22} | — | November 18, 2008 | Catalina | CSS | · | 4.7 km | MPC · JPL |
| 330820 | 2008 WH_{62} | — | November 24, 2008 | Mayhill | Lowe, A. | · | 6.7 km | MPC · JPL |
| 330821 | 2008 WS_{76} | — | November 20, 2008 | Kitt Peak | Spacewatch | · | 4.1 km | MPC · JPL |
| 330822 | 2008 WA_{91} | — | November 23, 2008 | Mount Lemmon | Mount Lemmon Survey | T_{j} (2.96) · 3:2 | 4.4 km | MPC · JPL |
| 330823 | 2008 WM_{97} | — | November 19, 2008 | Catalina | CSS | · | 5.3 km | MPC · JPL |
| 330824 | 2008 WZ_{136} | — | November 21, 2008 | Kitt Peak | Spacewatch | ARM | 5.8 km | MPC · JPL |
| 330825 | 2008 XE_{3} | — | December 6, 2008 | Socorro | LINEAR | AMO +1km | 1.8 km | MPC · JPL |
| 330826 | 2009 BV_{59} | — | January 16, 2009 | Mount Lemmon | Mount Lemmon Survey | · | 960 m | MPC · JPL |
| 330827 | 2009 DM_{33} | — | February 20, 2009 | Kitt Peak | Spacewatch | H | 510 m | MPC · JPL |
| 330828 | 2009 EQ_{3} | — | March 14, 2009 | La Sagra | OAM | H | 620 m | MPC · JPL |
| 330829 | 2009 FY | — | September 5, 2007 | Catalina | CSS | H | 670 m | MPC · JPL |
| 330830 | 2009 FC_{15} | — | March 16, 2009 | Kitt Peak | Spacewatch | MAS | 770 m | MPC · JPL |
| 330831 | 2009 FS_{29} | — | October 12, 1993 | Kitt Peak | Spacewatch | · | 950 m | MPC · JPL |
| 330832 | 2009 FG_{30} | — | March 25, 2009 | Bisei SG Center | BATTeRS | H | 700 m | MPC · JPL |
| 330833 | 2009 FG_{67} | — | December 29, 2003 | Catalina | CSS | MAR | 1.3 km | MPC · JPL |
| 330834 | 2009 HS_{36} | — | April 20, 2009 | La Sagra | OAM | H | 750 m | MPC · JPL |
| 330835 | 2009 HC_{42} | — | April 20, 2009 | Kitt Peak | Spacewatch | · | 1.4 km | MPC · JPL |
| 330836 Orius | 2009 HW_{77} | Orius | April 25, 2009 | Baldone | K. Černis, I. Eglītis | centaur | 60 km | MPC · JPL |
| 330837 | 2009 MQ_{2} | — | August 15, 2002 | Anderson Mesa | LONEOS | · | 1.1 km | MPC · JPL |
| 330838 | 2009 ND | — | July 3, 2009 | La Sagra | OAM | · | 2.8 km | MPC · JPL |
| 330839 | 2009 OS_{4} | — | July 20, 2009 | La Sagra | OAM | · | 1.8 km | MPC · JPL |
| 330840 | 2009 OW_{4} | — | July 25, 2009 | La Sagra | OAM | · | 2.5 km | MPC · JPL |
| 330841 | 2009 OE_{8} | — | July 27, 2009 | Catalina | CSS | JUN | 1.1 km | MPC · JPL |
| 330842 | 2009 OR_{8} | — | July 26, 2009 | La Sagra | OAM | · | 750 m | MPC · JPL |
| 330843 | 2009 OC_{20} | — | July 28, 2009 | La Sagra | OAM | · | 880 m | MPC · JPL |
| 330844 | 2009 OR_{22} | — | October 2, 2003 | Kitt Peak | Spacewatch | · | 740 m | MPC · JPL |
| 330845 | 2009 PD_{3} | — | November 10, 2006 | Kitt Peak | Spacewatch | V | 780 m | MPC · JPL |
| 330846 | 2009 PX_{3} | — | August 14, 2009 | La Sagra | OAM | V | 840 m | MPC · JPL |
| 330847 | 2009 PZ_{4} | — | August 15, 2009 | La Sagra | OAM | · | 1.6 km | MPC · JPL |
| 330848 | 2009 PT_{5} | — | August 15, 2009 | Grove Creek | Tozzi, F. | · | 950 m | MPC · JPL |
| 330849 | 2009 PO_{8} | — | August 15, 2009 | Catalina | CSS | NYS | 1.2 km | MPC · JPL |
| 330850 | 2009 PB_{12} | — | August 15, 2009 | Catalina | CSS | NYS | 1.4 km | MPC · JPL |
| 330851 | 2009 PP_{12} | — | February 3, 2001 | Kitt Peak | Spacewatch | · | 2.7 km | MPC · JPL |
| 330852 | 2009 PE_{15} | — | August 15, 2009 | Catalina | CSS | · | 3.1 km | MPC · JPL |
| 330853 | 2009 PR_{15} | — | August 15, 2009 | Kitt Peak | Spacewatch | · | 2.2 km | MPC · JPL |
| 330854 | 2009 PJ_{19} | — | August 15, 2009 | Kitt Peak | Spacewatch | · | 820 m | MPC · JPL |
| 330855 | 2009 QH_{1} | — | August 16, 2009 | Črni Vrh | Skvarč, J. | · | 1.0 km | MPC · JPL |
| 330856 Ernsthelene | 2009 QT_{9} | Ernsthelene | August 20, 2009 | Taunus | R. Kling, Zimmer, U. | V | 740 m | MPC · JPL |
| 330857 | 2009 QN_{19} | — | August 18, 2009 | Kitt Peak | Spacewatch | · | 1.2 km | MPC · JPL |
| 330858 | 2009 QP_{23} | — | August 16, 2009 | La Sagra | OAM | · | 1.6 km | MPC · JPL |
| 330859 | 2009 QP_{29} | — | August 23, 2009 | Bergisch Gladbach | W. Bickel | slow | 1.8 km | MPC · JPL |
| 330860 | 2009 QN_{30} | — | August 21, 2009 | Socorro | LINEAR | PHO | 1.4 km | MPC · JPL |
| 330861 | 2009 QM_{31} | — | August 20, 2009 | Kitt Peak | Spacewatch | · | 1.4 km | MPC · JPL |
| 330862 | 2009 QZ_{33} | — | October 2, 2003 | Kitt Peak | Spacewatch | · | 830 m | MPC · JPL |
| 330863 | 2009 QT_{41} | — | August 18, 2009 | Kitt Peak | Spacewatch | · | 1.1 km | MPC · JPL |
| 330864 | 2009 QK_{42} | — | October 16, 2004 | Socorro | LINEAR | · | 4.2 km | MPC · JPL |
| 330865 | 2009 QE_{46} | — | April 14, 2008 | Mount Lemmon | Mount Lemmon Survey | · | 3.3 km | MPC · JPL |
| 330866 | 2009 QJ_{47} | — | August 28, 2009 | La Sagra | OAM | · | 610 m | MPC · JPL |
| 330867 | 2009 QB_{48} | — | August 28, 2009 | La Sagra | OAM | · | 1.7 km | MPC · JPL |
| 330868 | 2009 QO_{51} | — | August 28, 2009 | Kitt Peak | Spacewatch | · | 1.2 km | MPC · JPL |
| 330869 | 2009 QR_{51} | — | August 28, 2009 | Kitt Peak | Spacewatch | MAS | 730 m | MPC · JPL |
| 330870 | 2009 QT_{61} | — | August 27, 2009 | Kitt Peak | Spacewatch | MAS | 930 m | MPC · JPL |
| 330871 | 2009 RF | — | September 9, 2009 | Bisei SG Center | BATTeRS | MAS | 800 m | MPC · JPL |
| 330872 | 2009 RF_{1} | — | September 10, 2009 | La Sagra | OAM | · | 1.9 km | MPC · JPL |
| 330873 | 2009 RQ_{1} | — | September 10, 2009 | ESA OGS | ESA OGS | NYS | 1.4 km | MPC · JPL |
| 330874 | 2009 RV_{9} | — | September 12, 2009 | Kitt Peak | Spacewatch | · | 1.1 km | MPC · JPL |
| 330875 | 2009 RY_{9} | — | March 13, 2007 | Mount Lemmon | Mount Lemmon Survey | · | 2.0 km | MPC · JPL |
| 330876 | 2009 RR_{17} | — | September 12, 2009 | Kitt Peak | Spacewatch | · | 1.8 km | MPC · JPL |
| 330877 | 2009 RF_{22} | — | September 15, 2009 | Kitt Peak | Spacewatch | · | 1.1 km | MPC · JPL |
| 330878 | 2009 RL_{26} | — | September 13, 2009 | Socorro | LINEAR | · | 1.2 km | MPC · JPL |
| 330879 | 2009 RX_{28} | — | September 14, 2009 | La Sagra | OAM | · | 1.2 km | MPC · JPL |
| 330880 | 2009 RV_{30} | — | September 14, 2009 | Kitt Peak | Spacewatch | · | 880 m | MPC · JPL |
| 330881 | 2009 RL_{33} | — | September 14, 2009 | Kitt Peak | Spacewatch | · | 1.9 km | MPC · JPL |
| 330882 | 2009 RJ_{34} | — | September 14, 2009 | Kitt Peak | Spacewatch | · | 2.2 km | MPC · JPL |
| 330883 | 2009 RH_{35} | — | September 14, 2009 | Kitt Peak | Spacewatch | KON | 4.2 km | MPC · JPL |
| 330884 | 2009 RG_{40} | — | September 15, 2009 | Kitt Peak | Spacewatch | · | 2.0 km | MPC · JPL |
| 330885 | 2009 RG_{48} | — | September 15, 2009 | Kitt Peak | Spacewatch | · | 1.9 km | MPC · JPL |
| 330886 | 2009 RW_{49} | — | September 15, 2009 | Kitt Peak | Spacewatch | · | 1.7 km | MPC · JPL |
| 330887 | 2009 RZ_{50} | — | September 15, 2009 | Kitt Peak | Spacewatch | · | 3.1 km | MPC · JPL |
| 330888 | 2009 RL_{54} | — | September 15, 2009 | Kitt Peak | Spacewatch | · | 1.4 km | MPC · JPL |
| 330889 | 2009 RO_{55} | — | September 15, 2009 | Kitt Peak | Spacewatch | · | 2.6 km | MPC · JPL |
| 330890 | 2009 RM_{61} | — | September 12, 2009 | La Sagra | OAM | · | 1.3 km | MPC · JPL |
| 330891 | 2009 RY_{70} | — | September 15, 2009 | Kitt Peak | Spacewatch | MAS | 670 m | MPC · JPL |
| 330892 | 2009 RF_{74} | — | September 15, 2009 | Kitt Peak | Spacewatch | · | 1.7 km | MPC · JPL |
| 330893 | 2009 SW_{7} | — | September 16, 2009 | Mount Lemmon | Mount Lemmon Survey | · | 1.3 km | MPC · JPL |
| 330894 | 2009 SS_{17} | — | September 17, 2009 | Catalina | CSS | · | 2.9 km | MPC · JPL |
| 330895 | 2009 SZ_{18} | — | September 21, 2009 | La Silla | La Silla | · | 1.4 km | MPC · JPL |
| 330896 | 2009 SX_{22} | — | September 16, 2009 | Kitt Peak | Spacewatch | · | 830 m | MPC · JPL |
| 330897 | 2009 SV_{30} | — | September 16, 2009 | Kitt Peak | Spacewatch | · | 850 m | MPC · JPL |
| 330898 | 2009 SA_{34} | — | September 16, 2009 | Kitt Peak | Spacewatch | · | 1.7 km | MPC · JPL |
| 330899 | 2009 SX_{38} | — | September 16, 2009 | Kitt Peak | Spacewatch | (5) | 2.6 km | MPC · JPL |
| 330900 | 2009 SS_{43} | — | January 14, 2002 | Kitt Peak | Spacewatch | HOF | 2.5 km | MPC · JPL |

== 330901–331000 ==
back to top

| Designation | | | Discovery | | | Properties | | Ref |
| Permanent | Provisional | Named after | Date | Site | Discoverer(s) | Category | Diam. | Ref |
|---|---|---|---|---|---|---|---|---|
| 330901 | 2009 SH_{53} | — | September 17, 2009 | Catalina | CSS | · | 2.6 km | MPC · JPL |
| 330902 | 2009 SR_{56} | — | September 17, 2009 | Kitt Peak | Spacewatch | · | 1.5 km | MPC · JPL |
| 330903 | 2009 SG_{66} | — | September 17, 2009 | Kitt Peak | Spacewatch | · | 1.6 km | MPC · JPL |
| 330904 | 2009 SR_{66} | — | September 17, 2009 | Kitt Peak | Spacewatch | AGN | 1.2 km | MPC · JPL |
| 330905 | 2009 SE_{67} | — | September 17, 2009 | Kitt Peak | Spacewatch | · | 3.6 km | MPC · JPL |
| 330906 | 2009 SX_{73} | — | September 17, 2009 | Kitt Peak | Spacewatch | · | 1.2 km | MPC · JPL |
| 330907 | 2009 SP_{74} | — | September 17, 2009 | Kitt Peak | Spacewatch | · | 2.3 km | MPC · JPL |
| 330908 | 2009 SX_{74} | — | September 17, 2009 | Kitt Peak | Spacewatch | AGN | 1.3 km | MPC · JPL |
| 330909 | 2009 SC_{75} | — | September 17, 2009 | Kitt Peak | Spacewatch | · | 1.1 km | MPC · JPL |
| 330910 | 2009 SD_{77} | — | February 4, 2006 | Kitt Peak | Spacewatch | · | 2.8 km | MPC · JPL |
| 330911 | 2009 SG_{88} | — | September 18, 2009 | Kitt Peak | Spacewatch | · | 1.8 km | MPC · JPL |
| 330912 | 2009 SQ_{92} | — | September 18, 2009 | Mount Lemmon | Mount Lemmon Survey | EOS | 2.1 km | MPC · JPL |
| 330913 | 2009 SX_{92} | — | September 18, 2009 | Purple Mountain | PMO NEO Survey Program | · | 2.2 km | MPC · JPL |
| 330914 | 2009 SW_{96} | — | September 19, 2009 | Mount Lemmon | Mount Lemmon Survey | · | 2.5 km | MPC · JPL |
| 330915 | 2009 SN_{102} | — | September 20, 2009 | Socorro | LINEAR | · | 3.2 km | MPC · JPL |
| 330916 | 2009 SS_{102} | — | September 23, 2009 | Taunus | Karge, S., R. Kling | · | 2.0 km | MPC · JPL |
| 330917 | 2009 SH_{104} | — | September 26, 2009 | La Sagra | OAM | EUN | 2.4 km | MPC · JPL |
| 330918 | 2009 SA_{108} | — | September 16, 2009 | Mount Lemmon | Mount Lemmon Survey | · | 5.5 km | MPC · JPL |
| 330919 | 2009 SC_{108} | — | September 16, 2009 | Mount Lemmon | Mount Lemmon Survey | · | 4.3 km | MPC · JPL |
| 330920 | 2009 SY_{125} | — | September 18, 2009 | Kitt Peak | Spacewatch | · | 2.4 km | MPC · JPL |
| 330921 | 2009 SP_{131} | — | September 18, 2009 | Kitt Peak | Spacewatch | · | 1.2 km | MPC · JPL |
| 330922 | 2009 SY_{132} | — | September 18, 2009 | Kitt Peak | Spacewatch | · | 1.5 km | MPC · JPL |
| 330923 | 2009 SV_{137} | — | September 18, 2009 | Kitt Peak | Spacewatch | · | 2.3 km | MPC · JPL |
| 330924 | 2009 SL_{154} | — | September 20, 2009 | Kitt Peak | Spacewatch | · | 1.7 km | MPC · JPL |
| 330925 | 2009 SW_{161} | — | September 21, 2009 | Catalina | CSS | · | 1.1 km | MPC · JPL |
| 330926 | 2009 SD_{177} | — | October 25, 2005 | Kitt Peak | Spacewatch | · | 2.2 km | MPC · JPL |
| 330927 | 2009 SG_{187} | — | March 14, 2007 | Mount Lemmon | Mount Lemmon Survey | EOS | 2.5 km | MPC · JPL |
| 330928 | 2009 SB_{188} | — | September 21, 2009 | Kitt Peak | Spacewatch | · | 1.8 km | MPC · JPL |
| 330929 | 2009 SU_{191} | — | September 22, 2009 | Kitt Peak | Spacewatch | · | 870 m | MPC · JPL |
| 330930 | 2009 SL_{201} | — | September 22, 2009 | Kitt Peak | Spacewatch | AST | 1.7 km | MPC · JPL |
| 330931 | 2009 SH_{202} | — | September 22, 2009 | Kitt Peak | Spacewatch | NYS | 1.1 km | MPC · JPL |
| 330932 | 2009 SG_{213} | — | September 23, 2009 | Kitt Peak | Spacewatch | · | 1.8 km | MPC · JPL |
| 330933 | 2009 SS_{213} | — | September 23, 2009 | Kitt Peak | Spacewatch | MAS | 690 m | MPC · JPL |
| 330934 Natevanwey | 2009 SX_{228} | Natevanwey | September 26, 2009 | LightBuckets | Cullen, S. | · | 1.5 km | MPC · JPL |
| 330935 | 2009 SQ_{229} | — | September 16, 2009 | Kitt Peak | Spacewatch | · | 2.3 km | MPC · JPL |
| 330936 | 2009 SB_{230} | — | September 16, 2009 | Mount Lemmon | Mount Lemmon Survey | · | 1.7 km | MPC · JPL |
| 330937 | 2009 SF_{231} | — | September 19, 2009 | Kitt Peak | Spacewatch | · | 2.4 km | MPC · JPL |
| 330938 | 2009 SP_{233} | — | September 21, 2009 | Catalina | CSS | · | 1.4 km | MPC · JPL |
| 330939 | 2009 SP_{234} | — | September 16, 2009 | Catalina | CSS | · | 2.2 km | MPC · JPL |
| 330940 | 2009 SW_{236} | — | September 16, 2009 | Catalina | CSS | · | 1.7 km | MPC · JPL |
| 330941 | 2009 SY_{238} | — | September 16, 2009 | Catalina | CSS | · | 1.8 km | MPC · JPL |
| 330942 | 2009 SL_{244} | — | September 17, 2009 | Kitt Peak | Spacewatch | · | 1.7 km | MPC · JPL |
| 330943 | 2009 SC_{267} | — | September 23, 2009 | Mount Lemmon | Mount Lemmon Survey | · | 4.7 km | MPC · JPL |
| 330944 | 2009 SY_{274} | — | September 25, 2009 | Kitt Peak | Spacewatch | · | 2.5 km | MPC · JPL |
| 330945 | 2009 SX_{276} | — | September 25, 2009 | Kitt Peak | Spacewatch | · | 1.1 km | MPC · JPL |
| 330946 | 2009 SC_{278} | — | September 25, 2009 | Kitt Peak | Spacewatch | · | 1.2 km | MPC · JPL |
| 330947 | 2009 SG_{279} | — | September 25, 2009 | Kitt Peak | Spacewatch | · | 1.6 km | MPC · JPL |
| 330948 | 2009 SH_{283} | — | September 25, 2009 | Kitt Peak | Spacewatch | · | 3.4 km | MPC · JPL |
| 330949 | 2009 SG_{284} | — | September 17, 2009 | Kitt Peak | Spacewatch | · | 2.3 km | MPC · JPL |
| 330950 | 2009 SR_{293} | — | September 26, 2009 | Kitt Peak | Spacewatch | · | 1.4 km | MPC · JPL |
| 330951 | 2009 SW_{293} | — | September 26, 2009 | Kitt Peak | Spacewatch | · | 1.5 km | MPC · JPL |
| 330952 | 2009 SD_{306} | — | September 17, 2009 | Kitt Peak | Spacewatch | NYS | 1.1 km | MPC · JPL |
| 330953 | 2009 SL_{329} | — | September 16, 2009 | Catalina | CSS | · | 1.7 km | MPC · JPL |
| 330954 | 2009 SW_{329} | — | September 17, 2009 | Kitt Peak | Spacewatch | · | 1.4 km | MPC · JPL |
| 330955 | 2009 SF_{338} | — | September 21, 2009 | Kitt Peak | Spacewatch | · | 2.1 km | MPC · JPL |
| 330956 | 2009 SO_{339} | — | September 22, 2009 | Mount Lemmon | Mount Lemmon Survey | · | 2.3 km | MPC · JPL |
| 330957 | 2009 SF_{340} | — | September 18, 2009 | Kitt Peak | Spacewatch | KOR | 1.2 km | MPC · JPL |
| 330958 | 2009 SK_{341} | — | September 25, 2009 | Kitt Peak | Spacewatch | · | 1.3 km | MPC · JPL |
| 330959 | 2009 SA_{344} | — | September 17, 2009 | Kitt Peak | Spacewatch | · | 1.5 km | MPC · JPL |
| 330960 | 2009 SP_{344} | — | September 18, 2009 | Kitt Peak | Spacewatch | · | 1.7 km | MPC · JPL |
| 330961 | 2009 SR_{344} | — | September 18, 2009 | Kitt Peak | Spacewatch | NEM | 2.0 km | MPC · JPL |
| 330962 | 2009 SV_{345} | — | September 19, 2009 | Kitt Peak | Spacewatch | · | 1.8 km | MPC · JPL |
| 330963 | 2009 SX_{345} | — | September 20, 2009 | Kitt Peak | Spacewatch | · | 1.0 km | MPC · JPL |
| 330964 | 2009 SF_{346} | — | September 23, 2009 | Mount Lemmon | Mount Lemmon Survey | · | 1.2 km | MPC · JPL |
| 330965 | 2009 SL_{347} | — | September 28, 2009 | Mount Lemmon | Mount Lemmon Survey | 615 | 2.0 km | MPC · JPL |
| 330966 | 2009 SB_{349} | — | September 20, 2009 | Mount Lemmon | Mount Lemmon Survey | · | 1.7 km | MPC · JPL |
| 330967 | 2009 SK_{349} | — | September 17, 2009 | Kitt Peak | Spacewatch | · | 2.8 km | MPC · JPL |
| 330968 | 2009 SX_{353} | — | September 22, 2009 | Mount Lemmon | Mount Lemmon Survey | · | 1.7 km | MPC · JPL |
| 330969 | 2009 SM_{357} | — | September 22, 2009 | Kitt Peak | Spacewatch | · | 2.5 km | MPC · JPL |
| 330970 | 2009 SP_{357} | — | September 24, 2009 | Catalina | CSS | EUN | 1.3 km | MPC · JPL |
| 330971 | 2009 SB_{358} | — | September 18, 2009 | Mount Lemmon | Mount Lemmon Survey | · | 2.0 km | MPC · JPL |
| 330972 | 2009 TC_{1} | — | October 10, 2009 | Bisei SG Center | BATTeRS | MAS | 730 m | MPC · JPL |
| 330973 | 2009 TH_{1} | — | October 10, 2009 | Bisei SG Center | BATTeRS | · | 3.0 km | MPC · JPL |
| 330974 | 2009 TR_{1} | — | October 8, 2009 | La Sagra | OAM | PHO | 930 m | MPC · JPL |
| 330975 | 2009 TL_{6} | — | August 1, 2009 | Kitt Peak | Spacewatch | · | 4.3 km | MPC · JPL |
| 330976 | 2009 TY_{10} | — | October 11, 2009 | La Sagra | OAM | · | 2.1 km | MPC · JPL |
| 330977 | 2009 TY_{11} | — | October 15, 2009 | La Sagra | OAM | · | 3.3 km | MPC · JPL |
| 330978 | 2009 TR_{13} | — | October 13, 2009 | Weihai | University, Shandong | · | 1.9 km | MPC · JPL |
| 330979 | 2009 TV_{15} | — | October 1, 2009 | Mount Lemmon | Mount Lemmon Survey | · | 3.7 km | MPC · JPL |
| 330980 | 2009 TD_{21} | — | December 5, 2005 | Kitt Peak | Spacewatch | PAD | 2.1 km | MPC · JPL |
| 330981 | 2009 TQ_{22} | — | October 14, 2009 | La Sagra | OAM | · | 2.7 km | MPC · JPL |
| 330982 | 2009 TX_{26} | — | October 14, 2009 | La Sagra | OAM | · | 2.5 km | MPC · JPL |
| 330983 | 2009 TV_{35} | — | October 14, 2009 | Catalina | CSS | NYS | 1.2 km | MPC · JPL |
| 330984 | 2009 TH_{41} | — | October 14, 2009 | Catalina | CSS | · | 2.5 km | MPC · JPL |
| 330985 | 2009 TB_{46} | — | October 12, 2009 | Mount Lemmon | Mount Lemmon Survey | · | 2.5 km | MPC · JPL |
| 330986 | 2009 TQ_{47} | — | October 1, 2009 | Mount Lemmon | Mount Lemmon Survey | NEM | 2.5 km | MPC · JPL |
| 330987 | 2009 UH_{11} | — | September 17, 2009 | Kitt Peak | Spacewatch | · | 1.6 km | MPC · JPL |
| 330988 | 2009 UT_{12} | — | October 17, 2009 | Mount Lemmon | Mount Lemmon Survey | · | 3.0 km | MPC · JPL |
| 330989 | 2009 UX_{24} | — | October 18, 2009 | Mount Lemmon | Mount Lemmon Survey | · | 3.3 km | MPC · JPL |
| 330990 | 2009 UY_{24} | — | October 18, 2009 | Mount Lemmon | Mount Lemmon Survey | · | 2.5 km | MPC · JPL |
| 330991 | 2009 UU_{25} | — | October 21, 2009 | Catalina | CSS | · | 2.8 km | MPC · JPL |
| 330992 | 2009 UM_{27} | — | October 21, 2009 | Catalina | CSS | · | 3.8 km | MPC · JPL |
| 330993 | 2009 UF_{28} | — | October 22, 2009 | Mount Lemmon | Mount Lemmon Survey | · | 2.1 km | MPC · JPL |
| 330994 | 2009 UH_{28} | — | October 22, 2009 | Catalina | CSS | · | 2.2 km | MPC · JPL |
| 330995 | 2009 UH_{32} | — | September 18, 2009 | Mount Lemmon | Mount Lemmon Survey | · | 4.1 km | MPC · JPL |
| 330996 | 2009 UT_{33} | — | October 18, 2009 | Mount Lemmon | Mount Lemmon Survey | · | 1.8 km | MPC · JPL |
| 330997 | 2009 UJ_{35} | — | October 21, 2009 | Mount Lemmon | Mount Lemmon Survey | · | 1.4 km | MPC · JPL |
| 330998 | 2009 UC_{37} | — | October 22, 2009 | Mount Lemmon | Mount Lemmon Survey | · | 1.2 km | MPC · JPL |
| 330999 | 2009 UJ_{46} | — | October 18, 2009 | Mount Lemmon | Mount Lemmon Survey | · | 2.5 km | MPC · JPL |
| 331000 | 2009 UV_{46} | — | October 18, 2009 | Mount Lemmon | Mount Lemmon Survey | EOS | 2.7 km | MPC · JPL |

back to top

== See also ==
- Meanings of minor-planet names: 330001–331000
