= Meanings of minor-planet names: 329001–330000 =

As minor planet discoveries are confirmed, they are given a permanent number by the IAU's Minor Planet Center (MPC), and the discoverers can then submit names for them, following the IAU's naming conventions. The list below concerns those minor planets in the specified number-range that have received names, and explains the meanings of those names.

Official naming citations of newly named small Solar System bodies are approved and published in a bulletin by IAU's Working Group for Small Bodies Nomenclature (WGSBN). Before May 2021, citations were published in MPC's Minor Planet Circulars for many decades. Recent citations can also be found on the JPL Small-Body Database (SBDB). Until his death in 2016, German astronomer Lutz D. Schmadel compiled these citations into the Dictionary of Minor Planet Names (DMP) and regularly updated the collection.

Based on Paul Herget's The Names of the Minor Planets, Schmadel also researched the unclear origin of numerous asteroids, most of which had been named prior to World War II. This article incorporates text from this source, which is in the public domain: SBDB New namings may only be added to this list below after official publication as the preannouncement of names is condemned. The WGSBN publishes a comprehensive guideline for the naming rules of non-cometary small Solar System bodies.

== 329001–329100 ==
Named minor planet	Provisional	This minor planet was named for...	Ref · Catalog
329008 Frankbeaurepaire	2010 XZ_{64}	Francis Beaurepaire, Australian Olympian, businessman, and civic leader.	IAU · 329008
329018 Neufeld	2011 AV_{6}	Michael J. Neufeld (b. 1951) is a Senior Curator at the Smithsonian's National Air and Space Museum. He has written the authoritative biography of Wernher von Braun and has published articles on the history of NASA planetary exploration.	IAU · 329018
329025 Annekathrin	2011 AX_{18}	Named after Annekathrin Ullmann (1971–2002) of the DLR Institute of Planetary Research in Berlin, on the twentieth anniversary of her premature death.	IAU · 329025
329069 Russellporter	2011 BV_{7}	Russell W. Porter (1871–1949), the founder of the Springfield Telescope Makers in 1923 and designed its Stellafane Clubhouse built in 1924.	IAU · 329069

== 329101–329200 ==
back to top

Named minor planet	Provisional	This minor planet was named for...	Ref · Catalog
329200 Billhicks	2012 DS_{47}	William Melvin Hicks, American stand-up comedian and satirist.	IAU · 329200

== 329201–329300 ==
back to top

Named minor planet	Provisional	This minor planet was named for...	Ref · Catalog
There are no named minor planets in this number range

== 329301–329400 ==
back to top

Named minor planet	Provisional	This minor planet was named for...	Ref · Catalog
There are no named minor planets in this number range

== 329401–329500 ==
back to top

Named minor planet	Provisional	This minor planet was named for...	Ref · Catalog
There are no named minor planets in this number range

== 329501–329600 ==
back to top

Named minor planet	Provisional	This minor planet was named for...	Ref · Catalog
There are no named minor planets in this number range

== 329601–329700 ==
back to top

Named minor planet	Provisional	This minor planet was named for...	Ref · Catalog
There are no named minor planets in this number range

== 329701–329800 ==
back to top

Named minor planet	Provisional	This minor planet was named for...	Ref · Catalog
There are no named minor planets in this number range

== 329801–329900 ==
back to top

Named minor planet	Provisional	This minor planet was named for...	Ref · Catalog
There are no named minor planets in this number range

== 329901–330000 ==
back to top

Named minor planet	Provisional	This minor planet was named for...	Ref · Catalog
329935 Prévôt	2005 OH_{19}	Jean Prévôt (1585–1631), Swiss physician and professor in Italy at the University of Padua. Prévôt was born in Delémont, Switzerland, like the discoverer Michel Ory.	JPL · 329935

back to top

Preceded by 328,001–329,000	Meanings of minor-planet names List of minor planets: 329,001–330,000	Succeeded by 330,001–331,000
