= List of minor planets: 329001–330000 =

The following is a partial list of minor planets, running from minor-planet number 329001 through 330000, inclusive. The primary data for this and other partial lists is based on JPL's "Small-Body Orbital Elements" and data available from the Minor Planet Center. Critical list information is also provided by the MPC, unless otherwise specified from Lowell Observatory. A detailed description of the table's columns and additional sources are given on the main page including a complete list of every page in this series, and a statistical break-up on the dynamical classification of minor planets.

Also see the summary list of all named bodies in numerical and alphabetical order, and the corresponding naming citations for the number range of this particular list. New namings may only be added to this list after official publication, as the preannouncement of names is condemned by the Working Group for Small Bodies Nomenclature of the International Astronomical Union.

Near-Earth obj.	MBA (inner)	MBA (outer)	Centaur
Mars-crosser	MBA (middle)	Jupiter trojan	Trans-Neptunian obj.
Unclassified

== 329001–329100 ==
Designation			Discovery			Properties		Ref
Permanent	Provisional	Named after	Date	Site	Discoverer(s)	Category	Diam.	Ref
329001	2010 XD_{38}	—	August 20, 1998	Kitt Peak	Spacewatch	·	1.5 km	MPC · JPL
329002	2010 XN_{43}	—	December 15, 2002	Haleakala	NEAT	·	1.5 km	MPC · JPL
329003	2010 XJ_{45}	—	November 27, 2000	Socorro	LINEAR	·	950 m	MPC · JPL
329004	2010 XC_{50}	—	August 4, 2005	Palomar	NEAT	·	1.9 km	MPC · JPL
329005	2010 XO_{57}	—	December 17, 2001	Kitt Peak	Spacewatch	EUN	2.0 km	MPC · JPL
329006	2010 XQ_{59}	—	December 8, 2005	Kitt Peak	Spacewatch	·	3.0 km	MPC · JPL
329007	2010 XO_{62}	—	February 24, 2006	Catalina	CSS	·	4.4 km	MPC · JPL
329008 Frankbeaurepaire	2010 XZ_{64}	Frankbeaurepaire	June 23, 2004	Mauna Kea	Bedient, J.	L4 · ERY	7.5 km	MPC · JPL
329009	2010 XD_{68}	—	August 20, 2001	Palomar	NEAT	·	2.0 km	MPC · JPL
329010	2010 XV_{75}	—	October 27, 2005	Catalina	CSS	·	2.8 km	MPC · JPL
329011	2010 XY_{76}	—	January 23, 2007	Bergisch Gladbach	W. Bickel	·	2.0 km	MPC · JPL
329012	2010 XW_{78}	—	May 7, 2002	Kitt Peak	Spacewatch	·	4.4 km	MPC · JPL
329013	2010 XV_{84}	—	April 22, 1998	Kitt Peak	Spacewatch	V	810 m	MPC · JPL
329014	2010 YM_{5}	—	October 24, 2005	Kitt Peak	Spacewatch	·	2.2 km	MPC · JPL
329015	2011 AG	—	December 6, 2005	Mount Lemmon	Mount Lemmon Survey	·	2.3 km	MPC · JPL
329016	2011 AO_{2}	—	October 24, 2005	Mauna Kea	A. Boattini	·	3.8 km	MPC · JPL
329017	2011 AL_{6}	—	January 3, 2000	Socorro	LINEAR	TIR	4.2 km	MPC · JPL
329018 Neufeld	2011 AV_{6}	Neufeld	December 1, 2005	Kitt Peak	L. H. Wasserman, R. L. Millis	·	3.4 km	MPC · JPL
329019	2011 AB_{8}	—	August 27, 2009	Kitt Peak	Spacewatch	·	1.9 km	MPC · JPL
329020	2011 AY_{8}	—	October 26, 2005	Kitt Peak	Spacewatch	·	1.8 km	MPC · JPL
329021	2011 AL_{9}	—	October 2, 2009	Mount Lemmon	Mount Lemmon Survey	·	4.0 km	MPC · JPL
329022	2011 AS_{11}	—	January 4, 2006	Kitt Peak	Spacewatch	EOS	2.6 km	MPC · JPL
329023	2011 AX_{13}	—	January 28, 2007	Catalina	CSS	·	3.0 km	MPC · JPL
329024	2011 AF_{14}	—	November 25, 2005	Kitt Peak	Spacewatch	·	1.9 km	MPC · JPL
329025 Annekathrin	2011 AX_{18}	Annekathrin	February 21, 2001	Kitt Peak	Spacewatch	·	2.1 km	MPC · JPL
329026	2011 AF_{22}	—	February 2, 2000	Kitt Peak	Spacewatch	·	3.3 km	MPC · JPL
329027	2011 AO_{22}	—	October 27, 2005	Mount Lemmon	Mount Lemmon Survey	(16286)	2.8 km	MPC · JPL
329028	2011 AL_{23}	—	December 6, 2010	Mount Lemmon	Mount Lemmon Survey	·	2.8 km	MPC · JPL
329029	2011 AF_{25}	—	October 30, 2006	Catalina	CSS	V	740 m	MPC · JPL
329030	2011 AO_{25}	—	November 27, 2006	Mount Lemmon	Mount Lemmon Survey	·	1.3 km	MPC · JPL
329031	2011 AV_{25}	—	February 8, 2002	Kitt Peak	Spacewatch	·	2.0 km	MPC · JPL
329032	2011 AC_{30}	—	May 15, 2001	Anderson Mesa	LONEOS	·	4.1 km	MPC · JPL
329033	2011 AV_{30}	—	March 29, 2004	Kitt Peak	Spacewatch	3:2 · SHU	5.7 km	MPC · JPL
329034	2011 AC_{32}	—	December 12, 2004	Kitt Peak	Spacewatch	·	4.1 km	MPC · JPL
329035	2011 AJ_{33}	—	November 6, 2005	Kitt Peak	Spacewatch	·	1.5 km	MPC · JPL
329036	2011 AE_{35}	—	June 21, 2009	Mount Lemmon	Mount Lemmon Survey	·	5.1 km	MPC · JPL
329037	2011 AH_{38}	—	October 30, 2005	Kitt Peak	Spacewatch	·	2.0 km	MPC · JPL
329038	2011 AU_{40}	—	September 22, 1996	Xinglong	SCAP	·	1.8 km	MPC · JPL
329039	2011 AG_{41}	—	November 22, 2006	Mount Lemmon	Mount Lemmon Survey	·	1.6 km	MPC · JPL
329040	2011 AY_{41}	—	March 11, 2007	Kitt Peak	Spacewatch	HOF	2.9 km	MPC · JPL
329041	2011 AP_{42}	—	March 4, 2006	Kitt Peak	Spacewatch	·	2.9 km	MPC · JPL
329042	2011 AK_{43}	—	April 26, 2007	Mount Lemmon	Mount Lemmon Survey	EOS	3.4 km	MPC · JPL
329043	2011 AY_{43}	—	January 7, 2000	Kitt Peak	Spacewatch	·	3.2 km	MPC · JPL
329044	2011 AX_{44}	—	December 24, 2006	Kitt Peak	Spacewatch	·	1.4 km	MPC · JPL
329045	2011 AY_{46}	—	April 25, 2007	Mount Lemmon	Mount Lemmon Survey	·	2.3 km	MPC · JPL
329046	2011 AZ_{50}	—	August 25, 2004	Kitt Peak	Spacewatch	·	2.0 km	MPC · JPL
329047	2011 AC_{51}	—	March 16, 2007	Kitt Peak	Spacewatch	·	2.1 km	MPC · JPL
329048	2011 AZ_{51}	—	March 26, 2003	Kitt Peak	Spacewatch	·	1.6 km	MPC · JPL
329049	2011 AR_{52}	—	January 29, 2003	Palomar	NEAT	·	1.6 km	MPC · JPL
329050	2011 AO_{53}	—	March 29, 2006	Socorro	LINEAR	TIR	4.5 km	MPC · JPL
329051	2011 AN_{54}	—	December 6, 2010	Mount Lemmon	Mount Lemmon Survey	·	3.0 km	MPC · JPL
329052	2011 AR_{58}	—	December 19, 2004	Mount Lemmon	Mount Lemmon Survey	THM	2.3 km	MPC · JPL
329053	2011 AN_{59}	—	March 11, 2003	Kitt Peak	Spacewatch	·	1.9 km	MPC · JPL
329054	2011 AU_{59}	—	February 1, 2006	Kitt Peak	Spacewatch	·	1.9 km	MPC · JPL
329055	2011 AN_{60}	—	March 11, 2007	Kitt Peak	Spacewatch	·	2.8 km	MPC · JPL
329056	2011 AA_{64}	—	December 27, 2006	Mount Lemmon	Mount Lemmon Survey	·	3.0 km	MPC · JPL
329057	2011 AF_{66}	—	February 18, 2008	Mount Lemmon	Mount Lemmon Survey	(2076)	1.1 km	MPC · JPL
329058	2011 AK_{68}	—	January 28, 2000	Kitt Peak	Spacewatch	·	2.4 km	MPC · JPL
329059	2011 AE_{70}	—	September 24, 2009	Catalina	CSS	·	3.3 km	MPC · JPL
329060	2011 AT_{70}	—	December 5, 2005	Kitt Peak	Spacewatch	·	2.3 km	MPC · JPL
329061	2011 AX_{71}	—	November 4, 2004	Kitt Peak	Spacewatch	·	2.8 km	MPC · JPL
329062	2011 AH_{72}	—	October 25, 1997	Kitt Peak	Spacewatch	(5)	1.6 km	MPC · JPL
329063	2011 AR_{72}	—	November 1, 2005	Mount Lemmon	Mount Lemmon Survey	AGN	1.4 km	MPC · JPL
329064	2011 AT_{74}	—	November 3, 2005	Catalina	CSS	·	2.4 km	MPC · JPL
329065	2011 AS_{76}	—	September 22, 2009	Mount Lemmon	Mount Lemmon Survey	3:2 · SHU	5.7 km	MPC · JPL
329066	2011 BM_{2}	—	October 28, 2005	Kitt Peak	Spacewatch	·	1.4 km	MPC · JPL
329067	2011 BW_{2}	—	September 19, 2009	Kitt Peak	Spacewatch	MRX	1.4 km	MPC · JPL
329068	2011 BP_{4}	—	February 10, 2002	Socorro	LINEAR	·	2.7 km	MPC · JPL
329069 Russellporter	2011 BV_{7}	Russellporter	October 20, 2006	Kitt Peak	Deep Ecliptic Survey	·	1.4 km	MPC · JPL
329070	2011 BD_{8}	—	January 10, 2000	Kitt Peak	Spacewatch	HYG	3.1 km	MPC · JPL
329071	2011 BO_{8}	—	January 31, 2006	Kitt Peak	Spacewatch	THM	2.5 km	MPC · JPL
329072	2011 BB_{11}	—	January 26, 2006	Kitt Peak	Spacewatch	·	2.9 km	MPC · JPL
329073	2011 BJ_{12}	—	February 6, 2006	Mount Lemmon	Mount Lemmon Survey	·	3.3 km	MPC · JPL
329074	2011 BL_{14}	—	September 28, 2003	Anderson Mesa	LONEOS	EOS	3.1 km	MPC · JPL
329075	2011 BV_{14}	—	February 6, 2006	Catalina	CSS	·	3.6 km	MPC · JPL
329076	2011 BL_{17}	—	March 4, 2006	Kitt Peak	Spacewatch	·	3.1 km	MPC · JPL
329077	2011 BY_{26}	—	March 11, 2007	Catalina	CSS	·	3.1 km	MPC · JPL
329078	2011 BA_{27}	—	August 7, 2008	Kitt Peak	Spacewatch	EOS	2.6 km	MPC · JPL
329079	2011 BD_{30}	—	April 3, 2008	Mount Lemmon	Mount Lemmon Survey	·	1.5 km	MPC · JPL
329080	2011 BB_{32}	—	May 13, 2007	Mount Lemmon	Mount Lemmon Survey	EOS	2.6 km	MPC · JPL
329081	2011 BN_{34}	—	November 27, 2009	Mount Lemmon	Mount Lemmon Survey	CYB	5.6 km	MPC · JPL
329082	2011 BG_{46}	—	February 18, 2010	WISE	WISE	·	3.4 km	MPC · JPL
329083	2011 BM_{47}	—	November 4, 2005	Mount Lemmon	Mount Lemmon Survey	·	1.7 km	MPC · JPL
329084	2011 BX_{48}	—	February 23, 2006	Anderson Mesa	LONEOS	·	4.3 km	MPC · JPL
329085	2011 BD_{50}	—	May 2, 2006	Mount Lemmon	Mount Lemmon Survey	CYB	4.9 km	MPC · JPL
329086	2011 BQ_{53}	—	October 24, 2005	Mauna Kea	A. Boattini	·	2.4 km	MPC · JPL
329087	2011 BK_{54}	—	May 30, 1997	Kitt Peak	Spacewatch	·	2.4 km	MPC · JPL
329088	2011 BC_{56}	—	October 6, 2005	Mount Lemmon	Mount Lemmon Survey	EOS	2.1 km	MPC · JPL
329089	2011 BJ_{63}	—	February 21, 2007	Mount Lemmon	Mount Lemmon Survey	·	2.0 km	MPC · JPL
329090	2011 BU_{78}	—	February 3, 2006	Mount Lemmon	Mount Lemmon Survey	·	3.4 km	MPC · JPL
329091	2011 BC_{85}	—	January 23, 2006	Kitt Peak	Spacewatch	EOS	2.0 km	MPC · JPL
329092	2011 BL_{87}	—	February 2, 1997	Kitt Peak	Spacewatch	·	2.3 km	MPC · JPL
329093	2011 BN_{92}	—	September 19, 1998	Apache Point	SDSS	·	3.4 km	MPC · JPL
329094	2011 BE_{98}	—	July 14, 2007	Charleston	R. Holmes	·	4.0 km	MPC · JPL
329095	2011 BR_{100}	—	October 20, 2003	Kitt Peak	Spacewatch	·	3.4 km	MPC · JPL
329096	2011 BK_{102}	—	October 7, 2004	Kitt Peak	Spacewatch	·	2.3 km	MPC · JPL
329097	2011 BZ_{115}	—	October 25, 2005	Kitt Peak	Spacewatch	·	1.6 km	MPC · JPL
329098	2011 BL_{117}	—	November 15, 2001	Kitt Peak	Spacewatch	·	1.7 km	MPC · JPL
329099	2011 BN_{118}	—	October 1, 2009	Mount Lemmon	Mount Lemmon Survey	·	2.2 km	MPC · JPL
329100	2011 BY_{119}	—	April 24, 2001	Kitt Peak	Spacewatch	THM	2.0 km	MPC · JPL

== 329101–329200 ==
back to top

Designation			Discovery			Properties		Ref
Permanent	Provisional	Named after	Date	Site	Discoverer(s)	Category	Diam.	Ref
329101	2011 BB_{122}	—	March 26, 2006	Mount Lemmon	Mount Lemmon Survey	·	2.8 km	MPC · JPL
329102	2011 BM_{123}	—	November 30, 2005	Kitt Peak	Spacewatch	·	2.0 km	MPC · JPL
329103	2011 BE_{134}	—	February 25, 2006	Kitt Peak	Spacewatch	·	3.2 km	MPC · JPL
329104	2011 BV_{135}	—	March 15, 2007	Kitt Peak	Spacewatch	·	2.3 km	MPC · JPL
329105	2011 CG_{3}	—	October 14, 2009	Catalina	CSS	EOS	4.9 km	MPC · JPL
329106	2011 CV_{3}	—	October 22, 2003	Apache Point	SDSS	·	3.3 km	MPC · JPL
329107	2011 CG_{8}	—	March 3, 2000	Socorro	LINEAR	·	3.4 km	MPC · JPL
329108	2011 CG_{11}	—	July 30, 2008	Catalina	CSS	·	2.2 km	MPC · JPL
329109	2011 CL_{11}	—	January 26, 2006	Mount Lemmon	Mount Lemmon Survey	·	2.5 km	MPC · JPL
329110	2011 CM_{13}	—	May 17, 2007	Catalina	CSS	·	3.0 km	MPC · JPL
329111	2011 CG_{15}	—	January 31, 2006	Kitt Peak	Spacewatch	·	2.7 km	MPC · JPL
329112	2011 CM_{15}	—	January 23, 2006	Kitt Peak	Spacewatch	·	2.3 km	MPC · JPL
329113	2011 CQ_{18}	—	April 21, 2004	Kitt Peak	Spacewatch	3:2	5.2 km	MPC · JPL
329114	2011 CM_{19}	—	January 10, 2007	Mount Lemmon	Mount Lemmon Survey	·	1.2 km	MPC · JPL
329115	2011 CS_{20}	—	February 27, 2006	Kitt Peak	Spacewatch	·	3.1 km	MPC · JPL
329116	2011 CS_{26}	—	August 6, 2008	Siding Spring	SSS	EOS	2.6 km	MPC · JPL
329117	2011 CG_{27}	—	October 2, 2003	Kitt Peak	Spacewatch	·	4.0 km	MPC · JPL
329118	2011 CJ_{32}	—	December 24, 2005	Kitt Peak	Spacewatch	·	2.3 km	MPC · JPL
329119	2011 CP_{32}	—	January 8, 2006	Mount Lemmon	Mount Lemmon Survey	·	2.5 km	MPC · JPL
329120	2011 CX_{37}	—	March 26, 2007	Mount Lemmon	Mount Lemmon Survey	·	1.8 km	MPC · JPL
329121	2011 CK_{49}	—	December 5, 2005	Kitt Peak	Spacewatch	·	3.2 km	MPC · JPL
329122	2011 CO_{50}	—	June 21, 2007	Mount Lemmon	Mount Lemmon Survey	CYB	5.5 km	MPC · JPL
329123	2011 CL_{59}	—	January 31, 2006	Kitt Peak	Spacewatch	·	2.2 km	MPC · JPL
329124	2011 CU_{60}	—	August 30, 2002	Kitt Peak	Spacewatch	·	2.7 km	MPC · JPL
329125	2011 CP_{64}	—	November 25, 1997	Kitt Peak	Spacewatch	·	4.2 km	MPC · JPL
329126	2011 CB_{67}	—	September 17, 2009	Kitt Peak	Spacewatch	·	1.8 km	MPC · JPL
329127	2011 CU_{67}	—	March 3, 2006	Catalina	CSS	·	4.2 km	MPC · JPL
329128	2011 CW_{70}	—	March 27, 2001	Kitt Peak	Spacewatch	·	2.6 km	MPC · JPL
329129	2011 CO_{71}	—	October 25, 2009	Mount Lemmon	Mount Lemmon Survey	·	4.4 km	MPC · JPL
329130	2011 CX_{74}	—	July 24, 2003	Palomar	NEAT	·	3.4 km	MPC · JPL
329131	2011 CK_{75}	—	December 26, 2006	Catalina	CSS	·	2.1 km	MPC · JPL
329132	2011 CM_{75}	—	March 10, 2000	Socorro	LINEAR	·	4.1 km	MPC · JPL
329133	2011 CZ_{89}	—	October 22, 2003	Apache Point	SDSS	·	2.9 km	MPC · JPL
329134	2011 CL_{90}	—	October 21, 2003	Kitt Peak	Spacewatch	·	3.9 km	MPC · JPL
329135	2011 CA_{106}	—	October 24, 2009	Kitt Peak	Spacewatch	·	1.9 km	MPC · JPL
329136	2011 DG_{5}	—	November 26, 1998	Kitt Peak	Spacewatch	·	3.8 km	MPC · JPL
329137	2011 DU_{14}	—	August 9, 2004	Socorro	LINEAR	·	2.6 km	MPC · JPL
329138	2011 DH_{25}	—	August 23, 2008	Kitt Peak	Spacewatch	·	3.2 km	MPC · JPL
329139	2011 DY_{26}	—	August 28, 2002	Palomar	NEAT	·	4.4 km	MPC · JPL
329140	2011 DP_{45}	—	February 9, 2005	Mount Lemmon	Mount Lemmon Survey	·	3.7 km	MPC · JPL
329141	2011 EW_{8}	—	January 30, 2000	Kitt Peak	Spacewatch	EOS	2.3 km	MPC · JPL
329142	2011 EN_{55}	—	October 8, 2008	Catalina	CSS	EOS	2.8 km	MPC · JPL
329143	2011 EO_{75}	—	January 16, 2005	Kitt Peak	Spacewatch	·	4.3 km	MPC · JPL
329144	2011 UZ_{192}	—	June 15, 2004	Kitt Peak	Spacewatch	·	3.3 km	MPC · JPL
329145	2011 WB_{67}	—	April 20, 2007	Kitt Peak	Spacewatch	SYL · CYB	6.1 km	MPC · JPL
329146	2011 YO_{21}	—	September 7, 2004	Palomar	NEAT	EOS	2.8 km	MPC · JPL
329147	2011 YF_{31}	—	August 31, 2002	Kitt Peak	Spacewatch	·	1.0 km	MPC · JPL
329148	2011 YB_{67}	—	February 24, 2006	Mount Lemmon	Mount Lemmon Survey	·	5.9 km	MPC · JPL
329149	2011 YG_{68}	—	January 28, 2007	Mount Lemmon	Mount Lemmon Survey	·	2.3 km	MPC · JPL
329150	2011 YC_{73}	—	September 25, 2008	Mount Lemmon	Mount Lemmon Survey	L4	10 km	MPC · JPL
329151	2012 AV_{16}	—	July 8, 2003	Palomar	NEAT	·	5.5 km	MPC · JPL
329152	2012 BH_{18}	—	December 22, 2003	Kitt Peak	Spacewatch	·	970 m	MPC · JPL
329153	2012 BG_{19}	—	April 11, 2002	Palomar	NEAT	·	5.0 km	MPC · JPL
329154	2012 BT_{22}	—	January 9, 1999	Kitt Peak	Spacewatch	·	1.9 km	MPC · JPL
329155	2012 BX_{22}	—	July 26, 2010	WISE	WISE	·	6.6 km	MPC · JPL
329156	2012 BK_{25}	—	September 10, 2004	Kitt Peak	Spacewatch	·	3.5 km	MPC · JPL
329157	2012 BZ_{51}	—	February 9, 2003	Palomar	NEAT	NEM	2.7 km	MPC · JPL
329158	2012 BU_{54}	—	February 2, 2001	Kitt Peak	Spacewatch	·	4.1 km	MPC · JPL
329159	2012 BA_{59}	—	November 16, 2003	Kitt Peak	Spacewatch	·	1.4 km	MPC · JPL
329160	2012 BJ_{74}	—	March 20, 2007	Catalina	CSS	·	4.7 km	MPC · JPL
329161	2012 BR_{87}	—	March 24, 2003	Kitt Peak	Spacewatch	NEM	2.7 km	MPC · JPL
329162	2012 BC_{88}	—	January 4, 2001	Haleakala	NEAT	EOS	2.6 km	MPC · JPL
329163	2012 BH_{101}	—	February 2, 2005	Catalina	CSS	·	660 m	MPC · JPL
329164	2012 BA_{107}	—	June 22, 2004	Siding Spring	SSS	BAR	2.2 km	MPC · JPL
329165	2012 BM_{120}	—	September 13, 2005	Kitt Peak	Spacewatch	·	1.6 km	MPC · JPL
329166	2012 CH_{2}	—	April 15, 1994	Kitt Peak	Spacewatch	·	2.3 km	MPC · JPL
329167	2012 CX_{14}	—	December 14, 2006	Kitt Peak	Spacewatch	(13314)	1.8 km	MPC · JPL
329168	2012 CW_{39}	—	March 9, 2007	Mount Lemmon	Mount Lemmon Survey	·	3.1 km	MPC · JPL
329169	2012 CG_{47}	—	October 17, 2001	Kitt Peak	Spacewatch	·	2.0 km	MPC · JPL
329170	2012 CH_{50}	—	September 25, 2005	Kitt Peak	Spacewatch	HOF	3.3 km	MPC · JPL
329171	2012 CG_{55}	—	September 16, 2003	Kitt Peak	Spacewatch	·	4.6 km	MPC · JPL
329172	2012 CH_{55}	—	March 2, 2001	Anderson Mesa	LONEOS	TIR	3.6 km	MPC · JPL
329173	2012 DY_{3}	—	September 26, 2006	Kitt Peak	Spacewatch	BAR	1.2 km	MPC · JPL
329174	2012 DO_{12}	—	December 10, 2001	Kitt Peak	Spacewatch	·	3.1 km	MPC · JPL
329175	2012 DQ_{13}	—	April 4, 2003	Anderson Mesa	LONEOS	·	2.8 km	MPC · JPL
329176	2012 DA_{17}	—	June 23, 2001	Palomar	NEAT	·	1.7 km	MPC · JPL
329177	2012 DQ_{19}	—	September 18, 2003	Palomar	NEAT	·	860 m	MPC · JPL
329178	2012 DP_{21}	—	February 16, 2001	Kitt Peak	Spacewatch	MAS	740 m	MPC · JPL
329179	2012 DF_{22}	—	August 28, 2009	Kitt Peak	Spacewatch	·	3.1 km	MPC · JPL
329180	2012 DC_{23}	—	January 22, 2006	Mount Lemmon	Mount Lemmon Survey	·	3.5 km	MPC · JPL
329181	2012 DW_{23}	—	October 8, 2005	Kitt Peak	Spacewatch	·	1.7 km	MPC · JPL
329182	2012 DZ_{25}	—	September 18, 2003	Palomar	NEAT	·	5.2 km	MPC · JPL
329183	2012 DN_{27}	—	March 15, 2001	Kitt Peak	Spacewatch	·	1.5 km	MPC · JPL
329184	2012 DR_{27}	—	March 12, 2008	Kitt Peak	Spacewatch	RAF	1.0 km	MPC · JPL
329185	2012 DN_{28}	—	November 21, 2003	Kitt Peak	Spacewatch	V	810 m	MPC · JPL
329186	2012 DV_{28}	—	April 9, 2005	Mount Lemmon	Mount Lemmon Survey	·	910 m	MPC · JPL
329187	2012 DM_{29}	—	March 10, 2007	Mount Lemmon	Mount Lemmon Survey	KOR	2.1 km	MPC · JPL
329188	2012 DP_{29}	—	April 24, 2003	Haleakala	NEAT	·	2.3 km	MPC · JPL
329189	2012 DQ_{31}	—	January 23, 2006	Kitt Peak	Spacewatch	·	4.1 km	MPC · JPL
329190	2012 DB_{32}	—	February 3, 2006	Mount Lemmon	Mount Lemmon Survey	·	3.7 km	MPC · JPL
329191	2012 DB_{36}	—	September 16, 2009	Mount Lemmon	Mount Lemmon Survey	·	2.3 km	MPC · JPL
329192	2012 DJ_{36}	—	September 8, 2007	Mount Lemmon	Mount Lemmon Survey	·	580 m	MPC · JPL
329193	2012 DF_{39}	—	September 11, 2004	Kitt Peak	Spacewatch	KOR	2.0 km	MPC · JPL
329194	2012 DG_{39}	—	November 5, 2007	Mount Lemmon	Mount Lemmon Survey	·	970 m	MPC · JPL
329195	2012 DL_{40}	—	September 18, 1995	Kitt Peak	Spacewatch	MAS	800 m	MPC · JPL
329196	2012 DD_{45}	—	October 1, 2005	Mount Lemmon	Mount Lemmon Survey	·	2.3 km	MPC · JPL
329197	2012 DU_{45}	—	January 3, 2000	Kitt Peak	Spacewatch	NYS	1.1 km	MPC · JPL
329198	2012 DL_{46}	—	September 27, 2003	Kitt Peak	Spacewatch	NYS	920 m	MPC · JPL
329199	2012 DP_{46}	—	April 1, 2005	Kitt Peak	Spacewatch	·	1.3 km	MPC · JPL
329200 Billhicks	2012 DS_{47}	Billhicks	December 27, 2006	Mount Lemmon	Mount Lemmon Survey	·	2.0 km	MPC · JPL

== 329201–329300 ==
back to top

Designation			Discovery			Properties		Ref
Permanent	Provisional	Named after	Date	Site	Discoverer(s)	Category	Diam.	Ref
329201	2012 DM_{48}	—	March 10, 2005	Kitt Peak	Spacewatch	V	690 m	MPC · JPL
329202	2012 DA_{49}	—	March 11, 2003	Kitt Peak	Spacewatch	·	2.0 km	MPC · JPL
329203	2012 DE_{49}	—	May 18, 2006	Palomar	NEAT	·	1.2 km	MPC · JPL
329204	2012 DL_{49}	—	January 7, 2006	Socorro	LINEAR	·	3.7 km	MPC · JPL
329205	2012 DV_{52}	—	September 21, 2003	Kitt Peak	Spacewatch	·	3.0 km	MPC · JPL
329206	2012 DN_{53}	—	January 4, 2000	Kitt Peak	Spacewatch	NYS	1.6 km	MPC · JPL
329207	2012 DT_{54}	—	October 7, 2004	Kitt Peak	Spacewatch	·	2.3 km	MPC · JPL
329208	2012 DX_{55}	—	March 18, 2001	Socorro	LINEAR	TIR	3.3 km	MPC · JPL
329209	2012 DW_{57}	—	September 17, 2003	Kitt Peak	Spacewatch	·	770 m	MPC · JPL
329210	2012 DF_{58}	—	March 2, 2001	Socorro	LINEAR	·	4.0 km	MPC · JPL
329211	2012 DO_{59}	—	March 4, 2005	Mount Lemmon	Mount Lemmon Survey	·	1.2 km	MPC · JPL
329212	2012 DN_{61}	—	September 16, 2003	Kitt Peak	Spacewatch	·	3.6 km	MPC · JPL
329213	2012 DT_{73}	—	April 24, 2001	Kitt Peak	Spacewatch	·	1.2 km	MPC · JPL
329214	2012 DT_{75}	—	September 27, 2003	Kitt Peak	Spacewatch	·	3.2 km	MPC · JPL
329215	2012 DK_{76}	—	March 8, 2005	Mount Lemmon	Mount Lemmon Survey	·	1.0 km	MPC · JPL
329216	2012 DV_{76}	—	November 16, 2006	Kitt Peak	Spacewatch	·	1.2 km	MPC · JPL
329217	2012 DM_{77}	—	January 13, 2008	Kitt Peak	Spacewatch	·	1.6 km	MPC · JPL
329218	2012 DS_{77}	—	October 1, 2003	Kitt Peak	Spacewatch	·	1.3 km	MPC · JPL
329219	2012 DX_{81}	—	February 6, 2003	Kitt Peak	Spacewatch	·	2.2 km	MPC · JPL
329220	2012 DY_{81}	—	October 27, 2005	Kitt Peak	Spacewatch	·	2.3 km	MPC · JPL
329221	2012 DX_{82}	—	January 17, 2007	Kitt Peak	Spacewatch	·	1.6 km	MPC · JPL
329222	2012 DP_{83}	—	March 26, 2001	Socorro	LINEAR	·	1.4 km	MPC · JPL
329223	2012 DV_{83}	—	April 28, 1995	Kitt Peak	Spacewatch	·	920 m	MPC · JPL
329224	2012 DK_{86}	—	February 22, 2001	Kitt Peak	Spacewatch	·	4.2 km	MPC · JPL
329225	2012 EU_{2}	—	October 23, 2003	Kitt Peak	Spacewatch	·	1.3 km	MPC · JPL
329226	2012 EK_{3}	—	August 29, 2005	Kitt Peak	Spacewatch	·	1.7 km	MPC · JPL
329227	2012 EL_{3}	—	October 14, 2001	Socorro	LINEAR	·	2.4 km	MPC · JPL
329228	2012 EM_{3}	—	February 2, 2005	Kitt Peak	Spacewatch	·	770 m	MPC · JPL
329229	2012 EJ_{4}	—	November 10, 1999	Kitt Peak	Spacewatch	MAS	930 m	MPC · JPL
329230	2012 EN_{4}	—	February 10, 2002	Socorro	LINEAR	KOR	2.0 km	MPC · JPL
329231	2012 EZ_{5}	—	October 9, 2005	Kitt Peak	Spacewatch	·	1.2 km	MPC · JPL
329232	2012 EW_{6}	—	December 14, 2003	Kitt Peak	Spacewatch	·	1.3 km	MPC · JPL
329233	2012 EE_{11}	—	March 16, 2001	Kitt Peak	Spacewatch	·	3.4 km	MPC · JPL
329234	2012 ET_{11}	—	December 21, 2006	Kitt Peak	Spacewatch	·	1.5 km	MPC · JPL
329235	2012 EQ_{12}	—	September 27, 2003	Kitt Peak	Spacewatch	·	3.2 km	MPC · JPL
329236	2012 FH_{10}	—	January 9, 1999	Kitt Peak	Spacewatch	·	2.0 km	MPC · JPL
329237	2012 FG_{14}	—	April 28, 2000	Socorro	LINEAR	MAR	1.6 km	MPC · JPL
329238	2012 FZ_{22}	—	January 30, 2006	Kitt Peak	Spacewatch	THM	2.4 km	MPC · JPL
329239	2012 FL_{36}	—	November 25, 2005	Kitt Peak	Spacewatch	KOR	1.4 km	MPC · JPL
329240	2012 FZ_{36}	—	November 6, 1996	Kitt Peak	Spacewatch	V · slow	1 km	MPC · JPL
329241	2012 FT_{56}	—	March 14, 2004	Kitt Peak	Spacewatch	3:2	6.8 km	MPC · JPL
329242	4564 T-2	—	September 30, 1973	Palomar	C. J. van Houten, I. van Houten-Groeneveld, T. Gehrels	MAS	770 m	MPC · JPL
329243	4063 T-3	—	October 16, 1977	Palomar	C. J. van Houten, I. van Houten-Groeneveld, T. Gehrels	DOR	2.5 km	MPC · JPL
329244	1992 UA	—	October 18, 1992	Kitt Peak	Spacewatch	·	510 m	MPC · JPL
329245	1995 FP_{1}	—	March 23, 1995	Kitt Peak	Spacewatch	·	760 m	MPC · JPL
329246	1995 FN_{14}	—	March 27, 1995	Kitt Peak	Spacewatch	·	1.3 km	MPC · JPL
329247	1995 OY_{9}	—	July 30, 1995	Kitt Peak	Spacewatch	PHO	2.7 km	MPC · JPL
329248	1995 QQ_{6}	—	August 22, 1995	Kitt Peak	Spacewatch	·	800 m	MPC · JPL
329249	1995 US_{9}	—	October 16, 1995	Kitt Peak	Spacewatch	MAR	1.5 km	MPC · JPL
329250	1995 UL_{36}	—	October 21, 1995	Kitt Peak	Spacewatch	·	1.2 km	MPC · JPL
329251	1995 UU_{59}	—	October 19, 1995	Kitt Peak	Spacewatch	·	2.4 km	MPC · JPL
329252	1995 VQ_{10}	—	November 15, 1995	Kitt Peak	Spacewatch	·	840 m	MPC · JPL
329253	1996 MU	—	May 9, 1996	Kitt Peak	Spacewatch	·	1.2 km	MPC · JPL
329254	1996 XB_{30}	—	December 14, 1996	Kitt Peak	Spacewatch	MAS	740 m	MPC · JPL
329255	1997 TN_{1}	—	October 3, 1997	Caussols	ODAS	·	3.5 km	MPC · JPL
329256	1997 WZ_{10}	—	November 22, 1997	Kitt Peak	Spacewatch	·	4.1 km	MPC · JPL
329257	1998 KC	—	May 16, 1998	Socorro	LINEAR	·	3.1 km	MPC · JPL
329258	1998 RN_{10}	—	September 13, 1998	Kitt Peak	Spacewatch	·	1.8 km	MPC · JPL
329259	1998 RW_{14}	—	September 14, 1998	Kitt Peak	Spacewatch	·	1 km	MPC · JPL
329260	1998 SY_{40}	—	September 25, 1998	Kitt Peak	Spacewatch	NYS	1.2 km	MPC · JPL
329261	1998 SW_{123}	—	September 26, 1998	Socorro	LINEAR	·	1.5 km	MPC · JPL
329262	1998 UF_{1}	—	October 19, 1998	Catalina	CSS	PHO	1.9 km	MPC · JPL
329263	1998 VB_{50}	—	November 11, 1998	Socorro	LINEAR	·	2.4 km	MPC · JPL
329264	1999 CL_{123}	—	February 11, 1999	Socorro	LINEAR	·	3.1 km	MPC · JPL
329265	1999 QZ	—	August 17, 1999	Kitt Peak	Spacewatch	·	1.0 km	MPC · JPL
329266	1999 RK_{131}	—	September 13, 1999	Kitt Peak	Spacewatch	·	1.7 km	MPC · JPL
329267	1999 RQ_{153}	—	September 9, 1999	Socorro	LINEAR	·	890 m	MPC · JPL
329268	1999 RC_{235}	—	September 8, 1999	Catalina	CSS	·	790 m	MPC · JPL
329269	1999 SQ_{14}	—	September 29, 1999	Catalina	CSS	·	2.9 km	MPC · JPL
329270	1999 TH_{33}	—	October 4, 1999	Socorro	LINEAR	·	700 m	MPC · JPL
329271	1999 TH_{125}	—	October 4, 1999	Socorro	LINEAR	·	2.3 km	MPC · JPL
329272	1999 TP_{178}	—	October 10, 1999	Socorro	LINEAR	·	930 m	MPC · JPL
329273	1999 TZ_{221}	—	October 1, 1999	Catalina	CSS	·	720 m	MPC · JPL
329274	1999 TO_{256}	—	October 9, 1999	Socorro	LINEAR	·	2.1 km	MPC · JPL
329275	1999 VP_{6}	—	November 5, 1999	Socorro	LINEAR	APO	340 m	MPC · JPL
329276	1999 VF_{40}	—	November 15, 1999	Bergisch Gladbach	W. Bickel	·	2.5 km	MPC · JPL
329277	1999 VR_{46}	—	November 3, 1999	Socorro	LINEAR	PHO	2.4 km	MPC · JPL
329278	1999 VA_{107}	—	November 9, 1999	Socorro	LINEAR	·	1.2 km	MPC · JPL
329279	1999 VD_{117}	—	November 6, 1999	Kitt Peak	Spacewatch	·	3.1 km	MPC · JPL
329280	1999 VD_{141}	—	November 10, 1999	Kitt Peak	Spacewatch	·	2.2 km	MPC · JPL
329281	1999 VQ_{172}	—	November 14, 1999	Socorro	LINEAR	slow	5.6 km	MPC · JPL
329282	1999 WZ_{5}	—	November 30, 1999	Socorro	LINEAR	·	1.8 km	MPC · JPL
329283	1999 XQ_{261}	—	December 7, 1999	Socorro	LINEAR	·	1.2 km	MPC · JPL
329284	2000 CM_{106}	—	February 5, 2000	Kitt Peak	M. W. Buie	MAS	740 m	MPC · JPL
329285	2000 CU_{106}	—	February 5, 2000	Kitt Peak	M. W. Buie	·	1.2 km	MPC · JPL
329286	2000 DA_{67}	—	February 25, 2000	Kitt Peak	Spacewatch	·	3.2 km	MPC · JPL
329287	2000 DJ_{91}	—	February 25, 2000	Kitt Peak	Spacewatch	·	3.3 km	MPC · JPL
329288	2000 ES_{2}	—	March 3, 2000	Socorro	LINEAR	V	990 m	MPC · JPL
329289	2000 FR_{4}	—	March 27, 2000	Kitt Peak	Spacewatch	·	3.3 km	MPC · JPL
329290	2000 HT_{3}	—	April 26, 2000	Kitt Peak	Spacewatch	·	3.6 km	MPC · JPL
329291	2000 JB_{6}	—	May 2, 2000	Socorro	LINEAR	AMO	510 m	MPC · JPL
329292	2000 LK_{16}	—	June 8, 2000	Socorro	LINEAR	·	3.0 km	MPC · JPL
329293	2000 NF_{19}	—	July 5, 2000	Anderson Mesa	LONEOS	(5)	1.9 km	MPC · JPL
329294	2000 QP_{36}	—	August 24, 2000	Socorro	LINEAR	(5)	2.0 km	MPC · JPL
329295	2000 QQ_{184}	—	August 26, 2000	Socorro	LINEAR	·	1.7 km	MPC · JPL
329296	2000 QF_{199}	—	August 29, 2000	Socorro	LINEAR	·	1.9 km	MPC · JPL
329297	2000 QW_{213}	—	August 31, 2000	Socorro	LINEAR	·	1.4 km	MPC · JPL
329298	2000 RM	—	September 1, 2000	Socorro	LINEAR	·	1.5 km	MPC · JPL
329299	2000 RB_{37}	—	September 3, 2000	Socorro	LINEAR	·	3.5 km	MPC · JPL
329300	2000 RR_{57}	—	September 7, 2000	Kitt Peak	Spacewatch	·	2.4 km	MPC · JPL

== 329301–329400 ==
back to top

Designation			Discovery			Properties		Ref
Permanent	Provisional	Named after	Date	Site	Discoverer(s)	Category	Diam.	Ref
329301	2000 RM_{77}	—	September 7, 2000	Socorro	LINEAR	·	3.4 km	MPC · JPL
329302	2000 RF_{82}	—	September 1, 2000	Socorro	LINEAR	·	3.6 km	MPC · JPL
329303	2000 RW_{90}	—	September 3, 2000	Socorro	LINEAR	·	2.8 km	MPC · JPL
329304	2000 RB_{100}	—	September 5, 2000	Anderson Mesa	LONEOS	·	2.0 km	MPC · JPL
329305	2000 SY_{16}	—	September 23, 2000	Socorro	LINEAR	EUN	1.6 km	MPC · JPL
329306	2000 SJ_{19}	—	September 23, 2000	Socorro	LINEAR	·	2.4 km	MPC · JPL
329307	2000 SM_{31}	—	September 24, 2000	Socorro	LINEAR	·	1.5 km	MPC · JPL
329308	2000 SW_{37}	—	September 24, 2000	Socorro	LINEAR	(5)	1.7 km	MPC · JPL
329309	2000 SR_{57}	—	September 24, 2000	Socorro	LINEAR	·	1.5 km	MPC · JPL
329310	2000 SF_{68}	—	September 24, 2000	Socorro	LINEAR	EUN	2.0 km	MPC · JPL
329311	2000 SW_{89}	—	September 22, 2000	Socorro	LINEAR	·	2.4 km	MPC · JPL
329312	2000 SA_{130}	—	September 22, 2000	Socorro	LINEAR	·	4.3 km	MPC · JPL
329313	2000 SG_{183}	—	September 20, 2000	Haleakala	NEAT	·	760 m	MPC · JPL
329314	2000 SV_{204}	—	September 24, 2000	Socorro	LINEAR	·	1.3 km	MPC · JPL
329315	2000 SZ_{224}	—	September 27, 2000	Socorro	LINEAR	·	1.9 km	MPC · JPL
329316	2000 SL_{253}	—	September 24, 2000	Socorro	LINEAR	·	1.8 km	MPC · JPL
329317	2000 SY_{258}	—	September 24, 2000	Socorro	LINEAR	·	2.8 km	MPC · JPL
329318	2000 SA_{313}	—	September 27, 2000	Socorro	LINEAR	·	2.8 km	MPC · JPL
329319	2000 SL_{315}	—	September 28, 2000	Socorro	LINEAR	·	2.8 km	MPC · JPL
329320	2000 SJ_{355}	—	September 29, 2000	Anderson Mesa	LONEOS	·	2.9 km	MPC · JPL
329321	2000 TY_{31}	—	October 4, 2000	Kitt Peak	Spacewatch	·	1.3 km	MPC · JPL
329322	2000 TQ_{38}	—	October 1, 2000	Socorro	LINEAR	·	2.2 km	MPC · JPL
329323	2000 UW_{67}	—	October 25, 2000	Socorro	LINEAR	·	2.3 km	MPC · JPL
329324	2000 UB_{73}	—	October 25, 2000	Socorro	LINEAR	·	2.6 km	MPC · JPL
329325	2000 UU_{106}	—	October 30, 2000	Socorro	LINEAR	EUN	1.7 km	MPC · JPL
329326	2000 VB_{14}	—	November 1, 2000	Socorro	LINEAR	·	750 m	MPC · JPL
329327	2000 VR_{55}	—	November 3, 2000	Socorro	LINEAR	·	3.9 km	MPC · JPL
329328	2000 WH_{30}	—	November 20, 2000	Socorro	LINEAR	·	2.1 km	MPC · JPL
329329	2000 WW_{37}	—	November 20, 2000	Socorro	LINEAR	·	2.4 km	MPC · JPL
329330	2000 WD_{51}	—	November 27, 2000	Socorro	LINEAR	H	660 m	MPC · JPL
329331	2000 WH_{67}	—	November 27, 2000	Socorro	LINEAR	H	540 m	MPC · JPL
329332	2000 YZ_{128}	—	December 29, 2000	Haleakala	NEAT	·	2.6 km	MPC · JPL
329333	2001 CF_{46}	—	February 15, 2001	Socorro	LINEAR	·	4.4 km	MPC · JPL
329334	2001 FS_{96}	—	March 16, 2001	Socorro	LINEAR	·	1.2 km	MPC · JPL
329335	2001 FR_{136}	—	March 21, 2001	Anderson Mesa	LONEOS	·	3.5 km	MPC · JPL
329336	2001 FT_{216}	—	March 30, 2001	Kitt Peak	Spacewatch	MAS	700 m	MPC · JPL
329337	2001 HA_{26}	—	April 27, 2001	Kitt Peak	Spacewatch	·	940 m	MPC · JPL
329338	2001 JW_{2}	—	May 15, 2001	Palomar	NEAT	APO	500 m	MPC · JPL
329339	2001 JP_{4}	—	May 15, 2001	Palomar	NEAT	·	4.1 km	MPC · JPL
329340	2001 LM_{5}	—	June 13, 2001	Socorro	LINEAR	AMO	490 m	MPC · JPL
329341	2001 OU_{53}	—	July 21, 2001	Palomar	NEAT	·	2.1 km	MPC · JPL
329342	2001 OL_{100}	—	July 27, 2001	Anderson Mesa	LONEOS	·	1.2 km	MPC · JPL
329343	2001 QG_{96}	—	August 22, 2001	Socorro	LINEAR	AMO	330 m	MPC · JPL
329344	2001 QW_{152}	—	August 27, 2001	Eskridge	G. Hug	·	3.8 km	MPC · JPL
329345	2001 QW_{266}	—	August 20, 2001	Socorro	LINEAR	·	1.9 km	MPC · JPL
329346	2001 QW_{292}	—	August 16, 2001	Palomar	NEAT	fast	2.3 km	MPC · JPL
329347	2001 RY_{21}	—	September 7, 2001	Socorro	LINEAR	·	3.0 km	MPC · JPL
329348	2001 RY_{30}	—	September 7, 2001	Socorro	LINEAR	·	1.4 km	MPC · JPL
329349	2001 RK_{116}	—	September 12, 2001	Socorro	LINEAR	CYB	3.7 km	MPC · JPL
329350	2001 SF_{6}	—	September 18, 2001	Kitt Peak	Spacewatch	·	1.4 km	MPC · JPL
329351	2001 SS_{116}	—	September 16, 2001	Socorro	LINEAR	V	1.1 km	MPC · JPL
329352	2001 SN_{160}	—	September 17, 2001	Socorro	LINEAR	·	1.0 km	MPC · JPL
329353	2001 SW_{173}	—	September 16, 2001	Socorro	LINEAR	·	1.6 km	MPC · JPL
329354	2001 SR_{220}	—	September 19, 2001	Socorro	LINEAR	HYG	3.4 km	MPC · JPL
329355	2001 SZ_{221}	—	September 19, 2001	Socorro	LINEAR	·	1.6 km	MPC · JPL
329356	2001 SO_{259}	—	September 20, 2001	Socorro	LINEAR	·	1.2 km	MPC · JPL
329357	2001 SC_{261}	—	September 20, 2001	Socorro	LINEAR	(194)	2.9 km	MPC · JPL
329358	2001 SG_{338}	—	September 20, 2001	Socorro	LINEAR	·	1.3 km	MPC · JPL
329359	2001 TT_{55}	—	October 15, 2001	Socorro	LINEAR	·	2.9 km	MPC · JPL
329360	2001 TA_{111}	—	October 14, 2001	Socorro	LINEAR	·	3.7 km	MPC · JPL
329361	2001 TG_{119}	—	October 15, 2001	Socorro	LINEAR	MAR	1.6 km	MPC · JPL
329362	2001 TF_{156}	—	October 14, 2001	Kitt Peak	Spacewatch	·	1.3 km	MPC · JPL
329363	2001 TQ_{180}	—	October 14, 2001	Socorro	LINEAR	CYB	5.0 km	MPC · JPL
329364	2001 UT_{38}	—	October 7, 2001	Palomar	NEAT	·	1.4 km	MPC · JPL
329365	2001 UA_{107}	—	October 20, 2001	Socorro	LINEAR	·	1.1 km	MPC · JPL
329366	2001 UZ_{135}	—	October 22, 2001	Socorro	LINEAR	·	1.6 km	MPC · JPL
329367	2001 UB_{138}	—	October 23, 2001	Socorro	LINEAR	(5)	1.3 km	MPC · JPL
329368	2001 UL_{155}	—	October 23, 2001	Socorro	LINEAR	HNS	1.6 km	MPC · JPL
329369	2001 UO_{166}	—	October 24, 2001	Kitt Peak	Spacewatch	·	1.4 km	MPC · JPL
329370	2001 UY_{190}	—	October 18, 2001	Palomar	NEAT	CYB	4.5 km	MPC · JPL
329371	2001 UJ_{229}	—	September 18, 2001	Apache Point	SDSS	·	1.3 km	MPC · JPL
329372	2001 VR_{70}	—	November 11, 2001	Socorro	LINEAR	·	1.8 km	MPC · JPL
329373	2001 VC_{79}	—	November 9, 2001	Palomar	NEAT	·	2.1 km	MPC · JPL
329374	2001 WK_{5}	—	November 21, 2001	Socorro	LINEAR	·	2.0 km	MPC · JPL
329375	2001 WV_{9}	—	November 17, 2001	Socorro	LINEAR	·	1.7 km	MPC · JPL
329376	2001 WA_{48}	—	November 19, 2001	Anderson Mesa	LONEOS	·	1.7 km	MPC · JPL
329377	2001 WP_{72}	—	November 20, 2001	Socorro	LINEAR	·	1.1 km	MPC · JPL
329378	2001 WT_{72}	—	November 20, 2001	Socorro	LINEAR	·	1.7 km	MPC · JPL
329379	2001 WK_{74}	—	October 26, 2001	Kitt Peak	Spacewatch	·	1.5 km	MPC · JPL
329380	2001 WN_{88}	—	November 19, 2001	Socorro	LINEAR	·	1.6 km	MPC · JPL
329381	2001 WJ_{91}	—	November 21, 2001	Socorro	LINEAR	EUN	1.7 km	MPC · JPL
329382	2001 XH_{39}	—	December 9, 2001	Socorro	LINEAR	·	2.2 km	MPC · JPL
329383	2001 XO_{79}	—	December 11, 2001	Socorro	LINEAR	EUN	1.1 km	MPC · JPL
329384	2001 XZ_{111}	—	December 11, 2001	Socorro	LINEAR	·	2.1 km	MPC · JPL
329385	2001 XA_{119}	—	December 13, 2001	Socorro	LINEAR	·	2.0 km	MPC · JPL
329386	2001 XG_{126}	—	December 14, 2001	Socorro	LINEAR	·	1.6 km	MPC · JPL
329387	2001 XS_{150}	—	December 14, 2001	Socorro	LINEAR	·	1.9 km	MPC · JPL
329388	2001 XW_{155}	—	December 14, 2001	Socorro	LINEAR	·	2.1 km	MPC · JPL
329389	2001 XJ_{187}	—	December 9, 2001	Kitt Peak	Spacewatch	·	2.9 km	MPC · JPL
329390	2001 YP_{2}	—	December 18, 2001	Palomar	NEAT	AMO	480 m	MPC · JPL
329391	2001 YD_{4}	—	December 22, 2001	Socorro	LINEAR	PHO	1.4 km	MPC · JPL
329392	2001 YJ_{11}	—	December 17, 2001	Socorro	LINEAR	·	2.0 km	MPC · JPL
329393	2001 YM_{17}	—	December 17, 2001	Socorro	LINEAR	·	1.3 km	MPC · JPL
329394	2001 YO_{25}	—	December 18, 2001	Socorro	LINEAR	ADE	2.0 km	MPC · JPL
329395	2002 AC	—	January 3, 2002	Socorro	LINEAR	APO +1km	990 m	MPC · JPL
329396	2002 AT_{46}	—	January 9, 2002	Socorro	LINEAR	·	1.9 km	MPC · JPL
329397	2002 AP_{55}	—	January 9, 2002	Socorro	LINEAR	·	670 m	MPC · JPL
329398	2002 AB_{147}	—	January 14, 2002	Socorro	LINEAR	·	1.6 km	MPC · JPL
329399	2002 AY_{161}	—	January 13, 2002	Socorro	LINEAR	DOR	3.5 km	MPC · JPL
329400	2002 AN_{173}	—	January 14, 2002	Socorro	LINEAR	·	1.8 km	MPC · JPL

== 329401–329500 ==
back to top

Designation			Discovery			Properties		Ref
Permanent	Provisional	Named after	Date	Site	Discoverer(s)	Category	Diam.	Ref
329401	2002 BE_{2}	—	January 22, 2002	Socorro	LINEAR	·	2.9 km	MPC · JPL
329402	2002 BM_{13}	—	January 8, 2002	Socorro	LINEAR	·	2.3 km	MPC · JPL
329403	2002 CP_{17}	—	February 6, 2002	Socorro	LINEAR	·	1.8 km	MPC · JPL
329404	2002 CS_{21}	—	February 5, 2002	Palomar	NEAT	·	2.5 km	MPC · JPL
329405	2002 CW_{218}	—	February 10, 2002	Socorro	LINEAR	·	660 m	MPC · JPL
329406	2002 CB_{292}	—	February 11, 2002	Anderson Mesa	LONEOS	·	2.1 km	MPC · JPL
329407	2002 EH_{23}	—	March 5, 2002	Kitt Peak	Spacewatch	HOF	2.4 km	MPC · JPL
329408	2002 EM_{42}	—	March 12, 2002	Socorro	LINEAR	·	910 m	MPC · JPL
329409	2002 ED_{95}	—	March 14, 2002	Socorro	LINEAR	WAT	2.0 km	MPC · JPL
329410	2002 EX_{155}	—	March 10, 2002	Cima Ekar	ADAS	·	1.0 km	MPC · JPL
329411	2002 GN_{97}	—	April 9, 2002	Kitt Peak	Spacewatch	·	680 m	MPC · JPL
329412	2002 JJ_{48}	—	May 9, 2002	Socorro	LINEAR	·	1.1 km	MPC · JPL
329413	2002 JJ_{68}	—	May 11, 2002	Socorro	LINEAR	·	1.1 km	MPC · JPL
329414	2002 KH_{16}	—	May 30, 2002	Palomar	NEAT	NAE	5.0 km	MPC · JPL
329415	2002 LS_{9}	—	June 5, 2002	Socorro	LINEAR	·	2.6 km	MPC · JPL
329416	2002 MF_{6}	—	October 9, 2008	Catalina	CSS	·	3.1 km	MPC · JPL
329417	2002 MC_{7}	—	November 23, 2006	Kitt Peak	Spacewatch	·	690 m	MPC · JPL
329418	2002 NV_{4}	—	July 10, 2002	Campo Imperatore	CINEOS	·	2.9 km	MPC · JPL
329419	2002 NV_{8}	—	July 1, 2002	Palomar	NEAT	·	1.0 km	MPC · JPL
329420	2002 NX_{20}	—	July 9, 2002	Socorro	LINEAR	·	940 m	MPC · JPL
329421	2002 NJ_{45}	—	July 13, 2002	Palomar	NEAT	·	3.2 km	MPC · JPL
329422	2002 NQ_{54}	—	July 5, 2002	Socorro	LINEAR	·	2.4 km	MPC · JPL
329423	2002 NU_{60}	—	July 4, 2002	Palomar	NEAT	EOS	2.4 km	MPC · JPL
329424	2002 NY_{64}	—	August 5, 2002	Palomar	NEAT	·	3.0 km	MPC · JPL
329425	2002 NT_{69}	—	July 14, 2002	Palomar	NEAT	·	2.4 km	MPC · JPL
329426	2002 NH_{71}	—	July 8, 2002	Palomar	NEAT	·	3.3 km	MPC · JPL
329427	2002 NT_{72}	—	July 8, 2002	Palomar	NEAT	V	680 m	MPC · JPL
329428	2002 NL_{76}	—	October 22, 2003	Kitt Peak	Spacewatch	EOS	2.0 km	MPC · JPL
329429	2002 NY_{76}	—	March 9, 2010	WISE	WISE	·	3.1 km	MPC · JPL
329430	2002 NM_{77}	—	September 4, 2008	Kitt Peak	Spacewatch	·	2.3 km	MPC · JPL
329431	2002 NV_{77}	—	January 16, 2004	Kitt Peak	Spacewatch	(5)	1.2 km	MPC · JPL
329432	2002 NE_{78}	—	July 27, 2009	Catalina	CSS	·	790 m	MPC · JPL
329433	2002 NJ_{78}	—	January 30, 2000	Kitt Peak	Spacewatch	·	2.6 km	MPC · JPL
329434	2002 OR	—	July 17, 2002	Socorro	LINEAR	·	980 m	MPC · JPL
329435	2002 OM_{11}	—	July 17, 2002	Palomar	NEAT	H	770 m	MPC · JPL
329436	2002 OC_{20}	—	July 22, 2002	Palomar	NEAT	·	640 m	MPC · JPL
329437	2002 OA_{22}	—	July 30, 2002	Palomar	NEAT	ATE · PHA	470 m	MPC · JPL
329438	2002 PL	—	August 1, 2002	Campo Imperatore	CINEOS	·	920 m	MPC · JPL
329439	2002 PG_{9}	—	August 5, 2002	Palomar	NEAT	·	3.9 km	MPC · JPL
329440	2002 PZ_{13}	—	August 6, 2002	Palomar	NEAT	·	2.5 km	MPC · JPL
329441	2002 PN_{19}	—	August 6, 2002	Palomar	NEAT	·	3.6 km	MPC · JPL
329442	2002 PV_{25}	—	August 6, 2002	Palomar	NEAT	NYS	920 m	MPC · JPL
329443	2002 PD_{26}	—	August 6, 2002	Palomar	NEAT	NYS	1.3 km	MPC · JPL
329444	2002 PC_{66}	—	August 6, 2002	Palomar	NEAT	(2076)	760 m	MPC · JPL
329445	2002 PK_{72}	—	August 12, 2002	Socorro	LINEAR	·	2.6 km	MPC · JPL
329446	2002 PO_{72}	—	August 12, 2002	Socorro	LINEAR	EOS	2.7 km	MPC · JPL
329447	2002 PP_{104}	—	August 12, 2002	Socorro	LINEAR	·	840 m	MPC · JPL
329448	2002 PG_{106}	—	August 12, 2002	Socorro	LINEAR	EMA	4.6 km	MPC · JPL
329449	2002 PA_{115}	—	August 15, 2002	Kitt Peak	Spacewatch	·	3.6 km	MPC · JPL
329450	2002 PY_{115}	—	August 13, 2002	Socorro	LINEAR	·	6.2 km	MPC · JPL
329451	2002 PT_{151}	—	August 8, 2002	Palomar	NEAT	·	860 m	MPC · JPL
329452	2002 PP_{167}	—	August 15, 2002	Palomar	NEAT	·	3.6 km	MPC · JPL
329453	2002 PT_{167}	—	August 8, 2002	Palomar	NEAT	THM	2.4 km	MPC · JPL
329454	2002 PF_{175}	—	August 11, 2002	Palomar	NEAT	·	2.7 km	MPC · JPL
329455	2002 PR_{176}	—	August 11, 2002	Palomar	NEAT	EOS	2.2 km	MPC · JPL
329456	2002 PB_{188}	—	August 8, 2002	Palomar	NEAT	·	3.1 km	MPC · JPL
329457	2002 PE_{191}	—	August 15, 2002	Palomar	NEAT	·	1.1 km	MPC · JPL
329458	2002 PM_{193}	—	August 6, 2002	Palomar	NEAT	·	2.6 km	MPC · JPL
329459	2002 PF_{196}	—	February 13, 2004	Kitt Peak	Spacewatch	V	770 m	MPC · JPL
329460	2002 PK_{198}	—	December 3, 2004	Kitt Peak	Spacewatch	EOS	2.9 km	MPC · JPL
329461	2002 PN_{199}	—	May 26, 2009	Kitt Peak	Spacewatch	·	990 m	MPC · JPL
329462	2002 QA_{4}	—	August 16, 2002	Haleakala	NEAT	·	3.3 km	MPC · JPL
329463	2002 QO_{6}	—	August 19, 2002	Kvistaberg	Uppsala-DLR Asteroid Survey	·	4.7 km	MPC · JPL
329464	2002 QK_{12}	—	August 26, 2002	Palomar	NEAT	VER	5.1 km	MPC · JPL
329465	2002 QH_{19}	—	August 26, 2002	Palomar	NEAT	·	860 m	MPC · JPL
329466	2002 QV_{24}	—	August 28, 2002	Socorro	LINEAR	·	7.4 km	MPC · JPL
329467	2002 QM_{29}	—	August 29, 2002	Palomar	NEAT	·	3.8 km	MPC · JPL
329468	2002 QM_{30}	—	August 29, 2002	Palomar	NEAT	HYG	3.7 km	MPC · JPL
329469	2002 QM_{35}	—	August 29, 2002	Palomar	NEAT	·	3.0 km	MPC · JPL
329470	2002 QU_{38}	—	August 30, 2002	Kitt Peak	Spacewatch	·	1.4 km	MPC · JPL
329471	2002 QL_{48}	—	August 18, 2002	Palomar	S. F. Hönig	·	720 m	MPC · JPL
329472	2002 QA_{51}	—	August 28, 2002	Palomar	R. Matson	·	3.5 km	MPC · JPL
329473	2002 QN_{62}	—	August 17, 2002	Palomar	NEAT	·	1.2 km	MPC · JPL
329474	2002 QX_{68}	—	August 29, 2002	Palomar	NEAT	V	520 m	MPC · JPL
329475	2002 QV_{72}	—	August 18, 2002	Palomar	NEAT	·	2.6 km	MPC · JPL
329476	2002 QX_{84}	—	August 16, 2002	Palomar	NEAT	·	3.5 km	MPC · JPL
329477	2002 QH_{90}	—	August 30, 2002	Palomar	NEAT	HYG	2.8 km	MPC · JPL
329478	2002 QH_{91}	—	August 18, 2002	Palomar	NEAT	·	2.9 km	MPC · JPL
329479	2002 QN_{91}	—	August 30, 2002	Palomar	NEAT	·	4.3 km	MPC · JPL
329480	2002 QP_{94}	—	August 26, 2002	Palomar	NEAT	V	560 m	MPC · JPL
329481	2002 QD_{96}	—	December 11, 2004	Kitt Peak	Spacewatch	·	3.3 km	MPC · JPL
329482	2002 QC_{102}	—	August 18, 2002	Palomar	NEAT	THM	2.6 km	MPC · JPL
329483	2002 QP_{108}	—	August 17, 2002	Palomar	NEAT	·	3.3 km	MPC · JPL
329484	2002 QY_{108}	—	August 17, 2002	Palomar	NEAT	·	2.6 km	MPC · JPL
329485	2002 QD_{113}	—	August 28, 2002	Palomar	NEAT	·	1.0 km	MPC · JPL
329486	2002 QR_{113}	—	August 27, 2002	Palomar	NEAT	·	3.3 km	MPC · JPL
329487	2002 QY_{114}	—	August 16, 2002	Palomar	NEAT	HYG	3.2 km	MPC · JPL
329488	2002 QJ_{115}	—	August 30, 2002	Palomar	NEAT	HYG	3.0 km	MPC · JPL
329489	2002 QT_{116}	—	August 18, 2002	Palomar	NEAT	·	1.2 km	MPC · JPL
329490	2002 QS_{117}	—	August 26, 2002	Palomar	NEAT	·	4.9 km	MPC · JPL
329491	2002 QQ_{132}	—	August 16, 2002	Palomar	NEAT	·	3.2 km	MPC · JPL
329492	2002 QQ_{140}	—	October 16, 2003	Kitt Peak	Spacewatch	·	4.6 km	MPC · JPL
329493	2002 QG_{145}	—	September 29, 2008	Catalina	CSS	LIX	3.9 km	MPC · JPL
329494	2002 RO_{9}	—	September 4, 2002	Palomar	NEAT	THM	2.7 km	MPC · JPL
329495	2002 RS_{39}	—	September 5, 2002	Socorro	LINEAR	·	4.9 km	MPC · JPL
329496	2002 RW_{72}	—	September 5, 2002	Socorro	LINEAR	·	1.0 km	MPC · JPL
329497	2002 RZ_{103}	—	September 5, 2002	Socorro	LINEAR	·	3.0 km	MPC · JPL
329498	2002 RY_{122}	—	September 8, 2002	Haleakala	NEAT	·	4.6 km	MPC · JPL
329499	2002 RL_{123}	—	September 8, 2002	Campo Imperatore	CINEOS	·	1.1 km	MPC · JPL
329500	2002 RP_{124}	—	September 9, 2002	Palomar	NEAT	·	5.9 km	MPC · JPL

== 329501–329600 ==
back to top

Designation			Discovery			Properties		Ref
Permanent	Provisional	Named after	Date	Site	Discoverer(s)	Category	Diam.	Ref
329501	2002 RA_{134}	—	September 10, 2002	Palomar	NEAT	V	760 m	MPC · JPL
329502	2002 RM_{137}	—	September 13, 2002	Socorro	LINEAR	·	2.2 km	MPC · JPL
329503	2002 RU_{139}	—	September 10, 2002	Palomar	NEAT	·	4.7 km	MPC · JPL
329504	2002 RN_{142}	—	September 11, 2002	Palomar	NEAT	VER	4.3 km	MPC · JPL
329505	2002 RB_{161}	—	September 12, 2002	Palomar	NEAT	HYG	3.2 km	MPC · JPL
329506	2002 RN_{162}	—	September 12, 2002	Palomar	NEAT	·	2.9 km	MPC · JPL
329507	2002 RC_{169}	—	September 13, 2002	Palomar	NEAT	·	4.4 km	MPC · JPL
329508	2002 RY_{175}	—	September 13, 2002	Palomar	NEAT	ELF	4.9 km	MPC · JPL
329509	2002 RG_{183}	—	September 11, 2002	Palomar	NEAT	·	5.4 km	MPC · JPL
329510	2002 RH_{184}	—	September 12, 2002	Palomar	NEAT	·	2.8 km	MPC · JPL
329511	2002 RB_{185}	—	September 12, 2002	Palomar	NEAT	·	4.3 km	MPC · JPL
329512	2002 RV_{200}	—	September 13, 2002	Socorro	LINEAR	·	3.6 km	MPC · JPL
329513	2002 RT_{229}	—	September 14, 2002	Haleakala	NEAT	·	1.2 km	MPC · JPL
329514	2002 RG_{238}	—	September 15, 2002	Palomar	R. Matson	·	940 m	MPC · JPL
329515	2002 RL_{242}	—	August 12, 2002	Socorro	LINEAR	·	3.8 km	MPC · JPL
329516	2002 RK_{267}	—	September 3, 2002	Palomar	NEAT	·	3.8 km	MPC · JPL
329517	2002 RF_{290}	—	September 4, 2002	Palomar	NEAT	EOS	1.8 km	MPC · JPL
329518	2002 RL_{291}	—	September 28, 2006	Mount Lemmon	Mount Lemmon Survey	·	1.2 km	MPC · JPL
329519	2002 RW_{291}	—	November 15, 2006	Socorro	LINEAR	·	1.6 km	MPC · JPL
329520	2002 SV	—	September 23, 2002	Haleakala	NEAT	AMO	380 m	MPC · JPL
329521	2002 SS_{17}	—	September 15, 2002	Palomar	NEAT	·	2.6 km	MPC · JPL
329522	2002 SR_{25}	—	September 28, 2002	Haleakala	NEAT	·	1.1 km	MPC · JPL
329523	2002 SK_{47}	—	September 30, 2002	Socorro	LINEAR	·	810 m	MPC · JPL
329524	2002 TT_{6}	—	October 1, 2002	Anderson Mesa	LONEOS	V	860 m	MPC · JPL
329525	2002 TW_{7}	—	October 1, 2002	Haleakala	NEAT	·	1.4 km	MPC · JPL
329526	2002 TU_{10}	—	October 2, 2002	Socorro	LINEAR	H	550 m	MPC · JPL
329527	2002 TK_{12}	—	October 1, 2002	Anderson Mesa	LONEOS	·	1.6 km	MPC · JPL
329528	2002 TK_{18}	—	October 2, 2002	Socorro	LINEAR	·	1.2 km	MPC · JPL
329529	2002 TA_{23}	—	October 2, 2002	Socorro	LINEAR	·	930 m	MPC · JPL
329530	2002 TM_{30}	—	October 2, 2002	Socorro	LINEAR	·	1.7 km	MPC · JPL
329531	2002 TV_{35}	—	October 2, 2002	Socorro	LINEAR	·	3.6 km	MPC · JPL
329532	2002 TM_{38}	—	October 2, 2002	Socorro	LINEAR	·	3.7 km	MPC · JPL
329533	2002 TA_{51}	—	October 2, 2002	Socorro	LINEAR	THB	3.5 km	MPC · JPL
329534	2002 TM_{56}	—	October 1, 2002	Anderson Mesa	LONEOS	·	3.6 km	MPC · JPL
329535	2002 TL_{61}	—	October 3, 2002	Campo Imperatore	CINEOS	·	4.5 km	MPC · JPL
329536	2002 TJ_{72}	—	October 3, 2002	Palomar	NEAT	·	3.9 km	MPC · JPL
329537	2002 TW_{81}	—	October 1, 2002	Haleakala	NEAT	·	3.2 km	MPC · JPL
329538	2002 TH_{93}	—	October 3, 2002	Palomar	NEAT	·	5.6 km	MPC · JPL
329539	2002 TA_{127}	—	September 29, 2002	Haleakala	NEAT	·	3.5 km	MPC · JPL
329540	2002 TR_{162}	—	October 5, 2002	Palomar	NEAT	H	780 m	MPC · JPL
329541	2002 TV_{173}	—	October 4, 2002	Socorro	LINEAR	·	1.5 km	MPC · JPL
329542	2002 TB_{199}	—	October 5, 2002	Socorro	LINEAR	·	4.4 km	MPC · JPL
329543	2002 TO_{230}	—	October 7, 2002	Palomar	NEAT	·	3.8 km	MPC · JPL
329544	2002 TV_{241}	—	October 7, 2002	Haleakala	NEAT	H	720 m	MPC · JPL
329545	2002 TN_{271}	—	October 9, 2002	Socorro	LINEAR	·	2.3 km	MPC · JPL
329546	2002 TN_{279}	—	October 10, 2002	Socorro	LINEAR	·	5.7 km	MPC · JPL
329547	2002 TG_{289}	—	October 10, 2002	Socorro	LINEAR	·	6.1 km	MPC · JPL
329548	2002 TE_{297}	—	October 11, 2002	Socorro	LINEAR	·	3.7 km	MPC · JPL
329549	2002 TG_{326}	—	October 5, 2002	Apache Point	SDSS	·	880 m	MPC · JPL
329550	2002 TJ_{342}	—	October 5, 2002	Apache Point	SDSS	·	3.4 km	MPC · JPL
329551	2002 TW_{366}	—	October 10, 2002	Apache Point	SDSS	·	960 m	MPC · JPL
329552	2002 TE_{376}	—	October 7, 2002	Haleakala	NEAT	·	1.6 km	MPC · JPL
329553	2002 TW_{377}	—	October 4, 2002	Palomar	NEAT	THM	2.2 km	MPC · JPL
329554	2002 TB_{381}	—	October 9, 2002	Palomar	NEAT	·	700 m	MPC · JPL
329555	2002 UB_{3}	—	October 28, 2002	Socorro	LINEAR	·	2.1 km	MPC · JPL
329556	2002 UA_{12}	—	October 30, 2002	Socorro	LINEAR	PHO	1.6 km	MPC · JPL
329557	2002 UJ_{14}	—	October 11, 2002	Socorro	LINEAR	·	4.3 km	MPC · JPL
329558	2002 UV_{20}	—	October 28, 2002	Haleakala	NEAT	·	6.7 km	MPC · JPL
329559	2002 UC_{31}	—	October 28, 2002	Palomar	NEAT	·	1.6 km	MPC · JPL
329560	2002 UK_{61}	—	October 30, 2002	Apache Point	SDSS	·	3.4 km	MPC · JPL
329561	2002 UV_{65}	—	October 30, 2002	Apache Point	SDSS	·	3.9 km	MPC · JPL
329562	2002 UV_{71}	—	October 31, 2002	Palomar	NEAT	·	1.1 km	MPC · JPL
329563	2002 UM_{79}	—	October 4, 2006	Mount Lemmon	Mount Lemmon Survey	·	1.4 km	MPC · JPL
329564	2002 VC_{14}	—	November 5, 2002	Socorro	LINEAR	PHO	2.4 km	MPC · JPL
329565	2002 VH_{35}	—	November 5, 2002	Socorro	LINEAR	·	1.4 km	MPC · JPL
329566	2002 VR_{41}	—	November 5, 2002	Palomar	NEAT	·	1.1 km	MPC · JPL
329567	2002 VS_{42}	—	November 6, 2002	Haleakala	NEAT	·	1.5 km	MPC · JPL
329568	2002 VH_{55}	—	November 6, 2002	Socorro	LINEAR	T_{j} (2.99) · EUP	6.3 km	MPC · JPL
329569	2002 VP_{57}	—	November 6, 2002	Haleakala	NEAT	·	1.1 km	MPC · JPL
329570	2002 VK_{75}	—	October 30, 2002	Haleakala	NEAT	·	1.1 km	MPC · JPL
329571	2002 VC_{92}	—	November 13, 2002	Socorro	LINEAR	AMO	580 m	MPC · JPL
329572	2002 VY_{106}	—	November 12, 2002	Socorro	LINEAR	·	1.5 km	MPC · JPL
329573	2002 VQ_{131}	—	October 4, 2002	Campo Imperatore	CINEOS	NYS	1.3 km	MPC · JPL
329574	2002 VH_{132}	—	November 1, 2002	La Palma	La Palma	V	650 m	MPC · JPL
329575	2002 VS_{138}	—	November 13, 2002	Xinglong	SCAP	CYB	4.3 km	MPC · JPL
329576	2002 VB_{142}	—	November 12, 2002	Palomar	NEAT	·	2.4 km	MPC · JPL
329577	2002 VU_{142}	—	November 5, 2002	Palomar	NEAT	H	590 m	MPC · JPL
329578	2002 VS_{143}	—	November 4, 2002	Palomar	NEAT	NYS	1.2 km	MPC · JPL
329579	2002 WY_{17}	—	November 28, 2002	Anderson Mesa	LONEOS	·	1.7 km	MPC · JPL
329580	2002 WW_{22}	—	November 24, 2002	Palomar	NEAT	L5	10 km	MPC · JPL
329581	2002 XV_{43}	—	December 6, 2002	Socorro	LINEAR	(5)	1.8 km	MPC · JPL
329582	2002 XK_{44}	—	December 6, 2002	Socorro	LINEAR	(5)	1.5 km	MPC · JPL
329583	2002 XC_{72}	—	December 11, 2002	Socorro	LINEAR	·	1.7 km	MPC · JPL
329584	2002 XD_{98}	—	December 5, 2002	Socorro	LINEAR	·	1.4 km	MPC · JPL
329585	2002 XW_{107}	—	December 5, 2002	Socorro	LINEAR	·	1.2 km	MPC · JPL
329586	2002 XY_{118}	—	December 10, 2002	Palomar	NEAT	·	1.1 km	MPC · JPL
329587	2003 AJ_{1}	—	January 1, 2003	Socorro	LINEAR	(5)	1.6 km	MPC · JPL
329588	2003 AX_{39}	—	January 7, 2003	Socorro	LINEAR	(5)	1.6 km	MPC · JPL
329589	2003 BO_{10}	—	January 26, 2003	Anderson Mesa	LONEOS	·	1.3 km	MPC · JPL
329590	2003 BF_{19}	—	January 26, 2003	Anderson Mesa	LONEOS	·	1.9 km	MPC · JPL
329591	2003 BV_{21}	—	January 27, 2003	Haleakala	NEAT	H	780 m	MPC · JPL
329592	2003 BG_{43}	—	January 27, 2003	Socorro	LINEAR	·	1.3 km	MPC · JPL
329593	2003 BG_{58}	—	January 27, 2003	Socorro	LINEAR	·	1.7 km	MPC · JPL
329594	2003 BG_{76}	—	January 29, 2003	Palomar	NEAT	·	2.0 km	MPC · JPL
329595	2003 BA_{85}	—	January 31, 2003	Socorro	LINEAR	(5)	1.7 km	MPC · JPL
329596	2003 CJ_{17}	—	February 7, 2003	Desert Eagle	W. K. Y. Yeung	·	1.4 km	MPC · JPL
329597	2003 CT_{25}	—	February 1, 2003	Palomar	NEAT	EUN	1.7 km	MPC · JPL
329598	2003 DJ_{11}	—	February 24, 2003	Campo Imperatore	CINEOS	·	1.5 km	MPC · JPL
329599	2003 EQ_{37}	—	March 8, 2003	Anderson Mesa	LONEOS	·	2.0 km	MPC · JPL
329600	2003 FF_{8}	—	March 30, 2003	Piszkéstető	K. Sárneczky	·	1.4 km	MPC · JPL

== 329601–329700 ==
back to top

Designation			Discovery			Properties		Ref
Permanent	Provisional	Named after	Date	Site	Discoverer(s)	Category	Diam.	Ref
329601	2003 FD_{66}	—	March 26, 2003	Kitt Peak	Spacewatch	·	1.5 km	MPC · JPL
329602	2003 FS_{94}	—	March 29, 2003	Anderson Mesa	LONEOS	JUN	1.5 km	MPC · JPL
329603	2003 FJ_{96}	—	March 25, 2003	Palomar	NEAT	·	2.6 km	MPC · JPL
329604	2003 FN_{101}	—	March 31, 2003	Socorro	LINEAR	ADE	3.6 km	MPC · JPL
329605	2003 FZ_{121}	—	March 31, 2003	Socorro	LINEAR	BAR	1.6 km	MPC · JPL
329606	2003 FH_{131}	—	March 24, 2003	Kitt Peak	Spacewatch	·	1.7 km	MPC · JPL
329607	2003 GE_{10}	—	April 2, 2003	Haleakala	NEAT	·	2.2 km	MPC · JPL
329608	2003 GD_{40}	—	April 8, 2003	Kvistaberg	Uppsala-DLR Asteroid Survey	ADE	2.6 km	MPC · JPL
329609	2003 GL_{42}	—	April 6, 2003	Anderson Mesa	LONEOS	·	2.3 km	MPC · JPL
329610	2003 GU_{54}	—	April 3, 2003	Anderson Mesa	LONEOS	·	720 m	MPC · JPL
329611	2003 HX_{4}	—	April 24, 2003	Kitt Peak	Spacewatch	·	1.8 km	MPC · JPL
329612	2003 JR_{6}	—	May 1, 2003	Socorro	LINEAR	·	2.6 km	MPC · JPL
329613	2003 JU_{16}	—	May 11, 2003	Socorro	LINEAR	·	4.4 km	MPC · JPL
329614	2003 KU_{2}	—	May 22, 2003	Kitt Peak	Spacewatch	T_{j} (2.99) · APO +1km · PHA	990 m	MPC · JPL
329615	2003 LV_{1}	—	June 3, 2003	Socorro	LINEAR	·	510 m	MPC · JPL
329616	2003 OM_{2}	—	July 22, 2003	Haleakala	NEAT	·	860 m	MPC · JPL
329617	2003 OW_{8}	—	July 23, 2003	Palomar	NEAT	·	3.0 km	MPC · JPL
329618	2003 ON_{21}	—	July 29, 2003	Reedy Creek	J. Broughton	·	720 m	MPC · JPL
329619	2003 OS_{22}	—	July 30, 2003	Socorro	LINEAR	·	2.7 km	MPC · JPL
329620	2003 OE_{33}	—	July 22, 2003	Palomar	NEAT	·	3.5 km	MPC · JPL
329621	2003 QW_{13}	—	August 18, 2003	Campo Imperatore	CINEOS	EMA	3.8 km	MPC · JPL
329622	2003 QY_{25}	—	August 22, 2003	Palomar	NEAT	·	1.9 km	MPC · JPL
329623	2003 QK_{94}	—	August 28, 2003	Haleakala	NEAT	·	2.2 km	MPC · JPL
329624	2003 QS_{110}	—	August 31, 2003	Socorro	LINEAR	·	5.1 km	MPC · JPL
329625	2003 QA_{113}	—	August 30, 2003	Socorro	LINEAR	·	3.9 km	MPC · JPL
329626	2003 RR_{12}	—	September 14, 2003	Haleakala	NEAT	MRX	1.4 km	MPC · JPL
329627	2003 RP_{24}	—	September 15, 2003	Palomar	NEAT	·	3.7 km	MPC · JPL
329628	2003 SF_{34}	—	September 18, 2003	Kitt Peak	Spacewatch	·	4.9 km	MPC · JPL
329629	2003 SM_{44}	—	September 16, 2003	Anderson Mesa	LONEOS	·	790 m	MPC · JPL
329630	2003 SC_{46}	—	September 16, 2003	Anderson Mesa	LONEOS	·	2.2 km	MPC · JPL
329631	2003 SO_{51}	—	September 18, 2003	Palomar	NEAT	EOS	2.6 km	MPC · JPL
329632	2003 SZ_{59}	—	August 31, 2003	Haleakala	NEAT	·	1.4 km	MPC · JPL
329633	2003 SD_{69}	—	September 17, 2003	Kitt Peak	Spacewatch	·	5.2 km	MPC · JPL
329634	2003 SL_{86}	—	September 16, 2003	Palomar	NEAT	TIR	3.4 km	MPC · JPL
329635	2003 SP_{89}	—	September 18, 2003	Palomar	NEAT	·	2.9 km	MPC · JPL
329636	2003 SE_{104}	—	September 21, 2003	Kitt Peak	Spacewatch	·	790 m	MPC · JPL
329637	2003 SV_{126}	—	September 19, 2003	Andrushivka	Andrushivka	·	2.2 km	MPC · JPL
329638	2003 SX_{135}	—	September 19, 2003	Campo Imperatore	CINEOS	·	2.9 km	MPC · JPL
329639	2003 SZ_{152}	—	September 22, 2003	Kitt Peak	Spacewatch	·	3.1 km	MPC · JPL
329640	2003 SZ_{162}	—	September 19, 2003	Kitt Peak	Spacewatch	EOS	2.6 km	MPC · JPL
329641	2003 SV_{163}	—	August 25, 2003	Cerro Tololo	Deep Ecliptic Survey	·	2.0 km	MPC · JPL
329642	2003 SN_{171}	—	September 18, 2003	Campo Imperatore	CINEOS	·	2.1 km	MPC · JPL
329643	2003 ST_{174}	—	September 18, 2003	Kitt Peak	Spacewatch	·	2.2 km	MPC · JPL
329644	2003 SN_{177}	—	September 18, 2003	Palomar	NEAT	·	750 m	MPC · JPL
329645	2003 SK_{178}	—	September 19, 2003	Palomar	NEAT	·	1.1 km	MPC · JPL
329646	2003 SG_{191}	—	September 18, 2003	Palomar	NEAT	·	4.3 km	MPC · JPL
329647	2003 SJ_{192}	—	September 20, 2003	Campo Imperatore	CINEOS	LIX	4.1 km	MPC · JPL
329648	2003 SB_{218}	—	September 27, 2003	Desert Eagle	W. K. Y. Yeung	·	3.1 km	MPC · JPL
329649	2003 SH_{242}	—	September 27, 2003	Kitt Peak	Spacewatch	MAS	660 m	MPC · JPL
329650	2003 SD_{249}	—	September 26, 2003	Socorro	LINEAR	INA	4.3 km	MPC · JPL
329651	2003 SY_{281}	—	September 19, 2003	Palomar	NEAT	·	5.3 km	MPC · JPL
329652	2003 SZ_{283}	—	September 20, 2003	Socorro	LINEAR	·	4.1 km	MPC · JPL
329653	2003 SJ_{285}	—	September 20, 2003	Kitt Peak	Spacewatch	·	3.8 km	MPC · JPL
329654	2003 SD_{319}	—	September 20, 2003	Anderson Mesa	LONEOS	·	3.8 km	MPC · JPL
329655	2003 SG_{322}	—	September 28, 2003	Socorro	LINEAR	·	720 m	MPC · JPL
329656	2003 SO_{328}	—	September 21, 2003	Palomar	NEAT	·	1.1 km	MPC · JPL
329657	2003 SA_{349}	—	September 18, 2003	Kitt Peak	Spacewatch	·	2.0 km	MPC · JPL
329658	2003 SG_{365}	—	September 26, 2003	Apache Point	SDSS	EOS	1.8 km	MPC · JPL
329659	2003 SZ_{383}	—	September 26, 2003	Apache Point	SDSS	·	660 m	MPC · JPL
329660	2003 SD_{397}	—	September 26, 2003	Apache Point	SDSS	EMA	4.0 km	MPC · JPL
329661	2003 ST_{397}	—	September 26, 2003	Apache Point	SDSS	·	700 m	MPC · JPL
329662	2003 SY_{399}	—	September 26, 2003	Apache Point	SDSS	·	2.4 km	MPC · JPL
329663	2003 SE_{411}	—	September 28, 2003	Apache Point	SDSS	·	1.8 km	MPC · JPL
329664	2003 TZ_{12}	—	October 5, 2003	Kitt Peak	Spacewatch	·	5.8 km	MPC · JPL
329665	2003 TJ_{29}	—	October 1, 2003	Kitt Peak	Spacewatch	·	4.8 km	MPC · JPL
329666	2003 TS_{34}	—	October 1, 2003	Kitt Peak	Spacewatch	·	3.8 km	MPC · JPL
329667	2003 TN_{39}	—	October 2, 2003	Kitt Peak	Spacewatch	EOS	2.4 km	MPC · JPL
329668	2003 TM_{56}	—	October 5, 2003	Kitt Peak	Spacewatch	EOS	2.1 km	MPC · JPL
329669	2003 UD_{8}	—	October 18, 2003	Socorro	LINEAR	AMO +1km	1.6 km	MPC · JPL
329670	2003 UE_{16}	—	October 16, 2003	Anderson Mesa	LONEOS	·	2.7 km	MPC · JPL
329671	2003 UF_{19}	—	October 20, 2003	Palomar	NEAT	·	3.0 km	MPC · JPL
329672	2003 UF_{27}	—	October 23, 2003	Goodricke-Pigott	R. A. Tucker	·	4.1 km	MPC · JPL
329673	2003 UO_{57}	—	October 16, 2003	Kitt Peak	Spacewatch	EOS	2.2 km	MPC · JPL
329674	2003 UF_{59}	—	October 16, 2003	Palomar	NEAT	·	5.9 km	MPC · JPL
329675	2003 UO_{61}	—	October 16, 2003	Anderson Mesa	LONEOS	·	880 m	MPC · JPL
329676	2003 UF_{75}	—	September 20, 2003	Kitt Peak	Spacewatch	·	1.1 km	MPC · JPL
329677	2003 UA_{115}	—	October 20, 2003	Kitt Peak	Spacewatch	·	3.5 km	MPC · JPL
329678	2003 UZ_{125}	—	October 20, 2003	Kitt Peak	Spacewatch	·	5.1 km	MPC · JPL
329679	2003 UC_{140}	—	October 16, 2003	Anderson Mesa	LONEOS	·	860 m	MPC · JPL
329680	2003 UB_{153}	—	October 22, 2003	Socorro	LINEAR	·	980 m	MPC · JPL
329681	2003 UD_{153}	—	October 21, 2003	Palomar	NEAT	·	2.9 km	MPC · JPL
329682	2003 UA_{154}	—	October 19, 2003	Kitt Peak	Spacewatch	EOS	3.0 km	MPC · JPL
329683	2003 UM_{157}	—	September 19, 2003	Kitt Peak	Spacewatch	·	2.7 km	MPC · JPL
329684	2003 UC_{162}	—	October 21, 2003	Socorro	LINEAR	EOS	2.3 km	MPC · JPL
329685	2003 UV_{166}	—	October 22, 2003	Kitt Peak	Spacewatch	EOS	2.5 km	MPC · JPL
329686	2003 UB_{197}	—	October 21, 2003	Kitt Peak	Spacewatch	BRA	1.9 km	MPC · JPL
329687	2003 UM_{197}	—	October 21, 2003	Anderson Mesa	LONEOS	EOS	2.6 km	MPC · JPL
329688	2003 UB_{200}	—	October 21, 2003	Socorro	LINEAR	·	2.1 km	MPC · JPL
329689	2003 UG_{200}	—	October 21, 2003	Socorro	LINEAR	·	3.6 km	MPC · JPL
329690	2003 UQ_{203}	—	October 21, 2003	Kitt Peak	Spacewatch	·	5.3 km	MPC · JPL
329691	2003 UN_{211}	—	October 23, 2003	Kitt Peak	Spacewatch	slow	4.4 km	MPC · JPL
329692	2003 UN_{220}	—	October 21, 2003	Kitt Peak	Spacewatch	·	3.3 km	MPC · JPL
329693	2003 UU_{227}	—	October 23, 2003	Kitt Peak	Spacewatch	·	3.4 km	MPC · JPL
329694	2003 UM_{228}	—	October 23, 2003	Kitt Peak	Spacewatch	EOS	2.4 km	MPC · JPL
329695	2003 UK_{241}	—	October 24, 2003	Socorro	LINEAR	THM	2.4 km	MPC · JPL
329696	2003 UY_{244}	—	October 19, 2003	Palomar	NEAT	·	1.6 km	MPC · JPL
329697	2003 US_{258}	—	October 25, 2003	Kitt Peak	Spacewatch	·	2.8 km	MPC · JPL
329698	2003 UN_{266}	—	October 28, 2003	Socorro	LINEAR	·	5.8 km	MPC · JPL
329699	2003 UO_{268}	—	October 28, 2003	Socorro	LINEAR	·	800 m	MPC · JPL
329700	2003 UQ_{269}	—	October 29, 2003	Socorro	LINEAR	EOS	2.6 km	MPC · JPL

== 329701–329800 ==
back to top

Designation			Discovery			Properties		Ref
Permanent	Provisional	Named after	Date	Site	Discoverer(s)	Category	Diam.	Ref
329701	2003 UV_{272}	—	October 29, 2003	Socorro	LINEAR	·	3.6 km	MPC · JPL
329702	2003 UG_{274}	—	October 30, 2003	Socorro	LINEAR	·	3.8 km	MPC · JPL
329703	2003 UN_{275}	—	October 29, 2003	Socorro	LINEAR	·	1.4 km	MPC · JPL
329704	2003 UW_{288}	—	October 23, 2003	Kitt Peak	M. W. Buie	EMA	3.5 km	MPC · JPL
329705	2003 UB_{298}	—	October 16, 2003	Kitt Peak	Spacewatch	KOR	1.4 km	MPC · JPL
329706	2003 UZ_{336}	—	September 22, 2003	Palomar	NEAT	·	3.3 km	MPC · JPL
329707	2003 UH_{353}	—	October 19, 2003	Apache Point	SDSS	·	690 m	MPC · JPL
329708	2003 UJ_{355}	—	October 19, 2003	Apache Point	SDSS	·	670 m	MPC · JPL
329709	2003 UF_{380}	—	October 22, 2003	Apache Point	SDSS	·	2.3 km	MPC · JPL
329710	2003 UM_{385}	—	October 22, 2003	Apache Point	SDSS	·	3.2 km	MPC · JPL
329711	2003 UD_{386}	—	October 22, 2003	Apache Point	SDSS	·	3.2 km	MPC · JPL
329712	2003 WV_{5}	—	November 18, 2003	Palomar	NEAT	·	5.2 km	MPC · JPL
329713	2003 WO_{7}	—	November 18, 2003	Kitt Peak	Spacewatch	AMO	610 m	MPC · JPL
329714	2003 WW_{22}	—	November 18, 2003	Kitt Peak	Spacewatch	·	960 m	MPC · JPL
329715	2003 WJ_{23}	—	November 18, 2003	Kitt Peak	Spacewatch	HYG	3.3 km	MPC · JPL
329716	2003 WK_{68}	—	November 19, 2003	Kitt Peak	Spacewatch	·	1.1 km	MPC · JPL
329717	2003 WN_{69}	—	November 19, 2003	Kitt Peak	Spacewatch	EOS	2.3 km	MPC · JPL
329718	2003 WD_{97}	—	November 19, 2003	Anderson Mesa	LONEOS	·	740 m	MPC · JPL
329719	2003 WY_{101}	—	November 21, 2003	Socorro	LINEAR	NYS	1.0 km	MPC · JPL
329720	2003 WM_{107}	—	November 23, 2003	Socorro	LINEAR	·	4.8 km	MPC · JPL
329721	2003 WG_{109}	—	November 20, 2003	Socorro	LINEAR	EOS	2.9 km	MPC · JPL
329722	2003 WE_{118}	—	November 20, 2003	Socorro	LINEAR	·	1.1 km	MPC · JPL
329723	2003 WH_{145}	—	November 2, 2003	Socorro	LINEAR	·	3.6 km	MPC · JPL
329724	2003 WR_{147}	—	November 23, 2003	Kitt Peak	Spacewatch	·	840 m	MPC · JPL
329725	2003 WX_{150}	—	November 24, 2003	Anderson Mesa	LONEOS	·	1.3 km	MPC · JPL
329726	2003 WZ_{160}	—	November 30, 2003	Kitt Peak	Spacewatch	·	2.9 km	MPC · JPL
329727	2003 WS_{167}	—	November 19, 2003	Palomar	NEAT	·	800 m	MPC · JPL
329728	2003 WQ_{170}	—	November 21, 2003	Palomar	NEAT	EOS	3.2 km	MPC · JPL
329729	2003 XM_{3}	—	December 1, 2003	Socorro	LINEAR	·	1.2 km	MPC · JPL
329730	2003 XP_{13}	—	December 14, 2003	Palomar	NEAT	·	2.9 km	MPC · JPL
329731	2003 XZ_{15}	—	December 14, 2003	Kitt Peak	Spacewatch	·	4.0 km	MPC · JPL
329732	2003 XS_{24}	—	December 1, 2003	Kitt Peak	Spacewatch	·	3.6 km	MPC · JPL
329733	2003 YF_{7}	—	December 17, 2003	Kitt Peak	Spacewatch	NYS	1.3 km	MPC · JPL
329734	2003 YC_{22}	—	December 18, 2003	Socorro	LINEAR	·	910 m	MPC · JPL
329735	2003 YJ_{28}	—	December 17, 2003	Palomar	NEAT	·	3.0 km	MPC · JPL
329736	2003 YF_{55}	—	December 19, 2003	Socorro	LINEAR	·	960 m	MPC · JPL
329737	2003 YG_{86}	—	December 19, 2003	Socorro	LINEAR	·	1.0 km	MPC · JPL
329738	2003 YF_{90}	—	December 19, 2003	Kitt Peak	Spacewatch	·	1.4 km	MPC · JPL
329739	2003 YY_{104}	—	December 21, 2003	Socorro	LINEAR	T_{j} (2.99) · EUP	6.2 km	MPC · JPL
329740	2003 YP_{117}	—	December 17, 2003	Wrightwood	J. W. Young	·	4.8 km	MPC · JPL
329741	2003 YV_{180}	—	December 17, 2003	Anderson Mesa	LONEOS	·	1.5 km	MPC · JPL
329742	2004 AB_{4}	—	January 13, 2004	Anderson Mesa	LONEOS	·	1.1 km	MPC · JPL
329743	2004 BU_{24}	—	January 19, 2004	Kitt Peak	Spacewatch	·	1.3 km	MPC · JPL
329744	2004 BV_{24}	—	January 19, 2004	Kitt Peak	Spacewatch	·	1.3 km	MPC · JPL
329745	2004 BC_{34}	—	January 19, 2004	Kitt Peak	Spacewatch	MAS	720 m	MPC · JPL
329746	2004 BL_{70}	—	January 22, 2004	Socorro	LINEAR	V	840 m	MPC · JPL
329747	2004 BS_{74}	—	January 24, 2004	Socorro	LINEAR	PHO	3.2 km	MPC · JPL
329748	2004 BM_{116}	—	January 26, 2004	Anderson Mesa	LONEOS	·	1.7 km	MPC · JPL
329749	2004 BA_{126}	—	January 16, 2004	Kitt Peak	Spacewatch	·	860 m	MPC · JPL
329750	2004 CO_{5}	—	February 10, 2004	Palomar	NEAT	·	1.7 km	MPC · JPL
329751	2004 CO_{44}	—	February 13, 2004	Kitt Peak	Spacewatch	·	1.2 km	MPC · JPL
329752	2004 CD_{65}	—	February 13, 2004	Kitt Peak	Spacewatch	·	1.5 km	MPC · JPL
329753	2004 CO_{91}	—	February 13, 2004	Desert Eagle	W. K. Y. Yeung	PHO	1.1 km	MPC · JPL
329754	2004 DY_{24}	—	February 16, 2004	Kitt Peak	Spacewatch	·	860 m	MPC · JPL
329755	2004 EV_{12}	—	March 11, 2004	Palomar	NEAT	NYS	1.6 km	MPC · JPL
329756	2004 EU_{18}	—	March 14, 2004	Kitt Peak	Spacewatch	·	1.7 km	MPC · JPL
329757	2004 ES_{20}	—	March 15, 2004	Socorro	LINEAR	H	610 m	MPC · JPL
329758	2004 ET_{28}	—	March 15, 2004	Kitt Peak	Spacewatch	·	730 m	MPC · JPL
329759	2004 EW_{80}	—	March 15, 2004	Socorro	LINEAR	·	1.5 km	MPC · JPL
329760	2004 EU_{109}	—	March 15, 2004	Kitt Peak	Spacewatch	MAS	690 m	MPC · JPL
329761	2004 FO_{4}	—	March 18, 2004	Socorro	LINEAR	·	1.4 km	MPC · JPL
329762	2004 FE_{51}	—	March 19, 2004	Palomar	NEAT	NYS	1.4 km	MPC · JPL
329763	2004 FY_{93}	—	March 22, 2004	Socorro	LINEAR	MAS	920 m	MPC · JPL
329764	2004 FC_{106}	—	February 13, 2004	Kitt Peak	Spacewatch	·	1.3 km	MPC · JPL
329765	2004 FB_{115}	—	March 21, 2004	Kitt Peak	Spacewatch	·	1.5 km	MPC · JPL
329766	2004 FJ_{157}	—	March 17, 2004	Kitt Peak	Spacewatch	MAS	680 m	MPC · JPL
329767	2004 GS_{57}	—	April 14, 2004	Kitt Peak	Spacewatch	·	1.1 km	MPC · JPL
329768	2004 GZ_{80}	—	April 13, 2004	Kitt Peak	Spacewatch	·	1.1 km	MPC · JPL
329769	2004 HV_{7}	—	April 19, 2004	Socorro	LINEAR	EUN	1.1 km	MPC · JPL
329770	2004 JA	—	May 1, 2004	Socorro	LINEAR	APO +1km	920 m	MPC · JPL
329771	2004 JA_{11}	—	May 12, 2004	Catalina	CSS	·	2.3 km	MPC · JPL
329772	2004 JQ_{34}	—	May 15, 2004	Socorro	LINEAR	·	1.5 km	MPC · JPL
329773	2004 JM_{38}	—	May 14, 2004	Kitt Peak	Spacewatch	H	610 m	MPC · JPL
329774	2004 LE	—	June 8, 2004	Socorro	LINEAR	T_{j} (2.56) · APO +1km	1.6 km	MPC · JPL
329775	2004 LA_{4}	—	June 12, 2004	Socorro	LINEAR	H	590 m	MPC · JPL
329776	2004 LL_{18}	—	June 12, 2004	Socorro	LINEAR	H	800 m	MPC · JPL
329777	2004 LV_{23}	—	June 11, 2004	Kitt Peak	Spacewatch	·	1.3 km	MPC · JPL
329778	2004 MA_{4}	—	June 22, 2004	Wrightwood	J. W. Young	·	2.0 km	MPC · JPL
329779	2004 MT_{7}	—	June 29, 2004	Siding Spring	SSS	·	2.4 km	MPC · JPL
329780	2004 NW_{7}	—	July 10, 2004	Catalina	CSS	ADE	2.9 km	MPC · JPL
329781	2004 NH_{15}	—	July 11, 2004	Socorro	LINEAR	·	1.7 km	MPC · JPL
329782	2004 NS_{23}	—	July 14, 2004	Socorro	LINEAR	·	1.9 km	MPC · JPL
329783	2004 NY_{23}	—	July 14, 2004	Socorro	LINEAR	·	4.7 km	MPC · JPL
329784	2004 NC_{30}	—	July 5, 2004	Campo Imperatore	CINEOS	·	1.4 km	MPC · JPL
329785	2004 NV_{33}	—	July 13, 2004	Siding Spring	SSS	BRG	2.2 km	MPC · JPL
329786	2004 PF_{17}	—	August 8, 2004	Campo Imperatore	CINEOS	·	1.8 km	MPC · JPL
329787	2004 PS_{20}	—	August 6, 2004	Palomar	NEAT	·	1.1 km	MPC · JPL
329788	2004 PA_{26}	—	August 8, 2004	Socorro	LINEAR	·	1.6 km	MPC · JPL
329789	2004 PV_{31}	—	August 8, 2004	Socorro	LINEAR	EUN	1.6 km	MPC · JPL
329790	2004 PC_{41}	—	August 9, 2004	Siding Spring	SSS	EUN	1.3 km	MPC · JPL
329791	2004 PK_{42}	—	August 9, 2004	Anderson Mesa	LONEOS	·	1.4 km	MPC · JPL
329792	2004 PP_{59}	—	August 9, 2004	Anderson Mesa	LONEOS	·	2.1 km	MPC · JPL
329793	2004 PZ_{62}	—	August 10, 2004	Socorro	LINEAR	EUN	1.1 km	MPC · JPL
329794	2004 PL_{100}	—	August 12, 2004	Socorro	LINEAR	·	1.6 km	MPC · JPL
329795	2004 PS_{102}	—	August 12, 2004	Socorro	LINEAR	·	2.0 km	MPC · JPL
329796	2004 PM_{107}	—	August 11, 2004	Palomar	NEAT	H	850 m	MPC · JPL
329797	2004 PQ_{107}	—	August 14, 2004	Palomar	NEAT	·	1.2 km	MPC · JPL
329798	2004 QR_{2}	—	August 20, 2004	Kitt Peak	Spacewatch	·	2.0 km	MPC · JPL
329799	2004 QY_{3}	—	August 16, 2004	Palomar	NEAT	(5)	1.6 km	MPC · JPL
329800	2004 QL_{6}	—	August 20, 2004	Kitt Peak	Spacewatch	·	1.4 km	MPC · JPL

== 329801–329900 ==
back to top

Designation			Discovery			Properties		Ref
Permanent	Provisional	Named after	Date	Site	Discoverer(s)	Category	Diam.	Ref
329801	2004 QS_{6}	—	August 21, 2004	Catalina	CSS	GEF	1.5 km	MPC · JPL
329802	2004 QX_{20}	—	August 20, 2004	Socorro	LINEAR	(14916)	5.0 km	MPC · JPL
329803	2004 QF_{21}	—	August 22, 2004	Kitt Peak	Spacewatch	·	760 m	MPC · JPL
329804	2004 RZ_{6}	—	September 5, 2004	Palomar	NEAT	·	1.8 km	MPC · JPL
329805	2004 RH_{15}	—	September 6, 2004	Kvistaberg	Uppsala-DLR Asteroid Survey	ADE	2.4 km	MPC · JPL
329806	2004 RG_{50}	—	September 8, 2004	Socorro	LINEAR	·	1.5 km	MPC · JPL
329807	2004 RN_{55}	—	September 8, 2004	Socorro	LINEAR	NEM	2.8 km	MPC · JPL
329808	2004 RD_{73}	—	September 8, 2004	Socorro	LINEAR	·	1.1 km	MPC · JPL
329809	2004 RP_{75}	—	September 8, 2004	Socorro	LINEAR	MIS	2.8 km	MPC · JPL
329810	2004 RY_{87}	—	September 7, 2004	Socorro	LINEAR	·	2.4 km	MPC · JPL
329811	2004 RT_{89}	—	September 8, 2004	Socorro	LINEAR	·	1.5 km	MPC · JPL
329812	2004 RS_{91}	—	September 8, 2004	Socorro	LINEAR	RAF	1.2 km	MPC · JPL
329813	2004 RF_{93}	—	September 8, 2004	Socorro	LINEAR	·	2.1 km	MPC · JPL
329814	2004 RF_{95}	—	September 8, 2004	Socorro	LINEAR	EUN	1.4 km	MPC · JPL
329815	2004 RM_{124}	—	September 7, 2004	Kitt Peak	Spacewatch	AGN	980 m	MPC · JPL
329816	2004 RA_{137}	—	September 8, 2004	Campo Imperatore	CINEOS	·	2.2 km	MPC · JPL
329817	2004 RJ_{137}	—	September 8, 2004	Socorro	LINEAR	·	2.5 km	MPC · JPL
329818	2004 RX_{147}	—	September 9, 2004	Socorro	LINEAR	·	3.0 km	MPC · JPL
329819	2004 RF_{152}	—	September 10, 2004	Socorro	LINEAR	·	3.0 km	MPC · JPL
329820	2004 RN_{152}	—	September 10, 2004	Socorro	LINEAR	GEF	1.3 km	MPC · JPL
329821	2004 RW_{160}	—	September 10, 2004	Kitt Peak	Spacewatch	AGN	1.4 km	MPC · JPL
329822	2004 RH_{176}	—	September 10, 2004	Socorro	LINEAR	·	2.1 km	MPC · JPL
329823	2004 RH_{189}	—	September 10, 2004	Socorro	LINEAR	·	2.1 km	MPC · JPL
329824	2004 RB_{195}	—	September 10, 2004	Socorro	LINEAR	TIN	1.1 km	MPC · JPL
329825	2004 RH_{210}	—	September 11, 2004	Socorro	LINEAR	·	2.7 km	MPC · JPL
329826	2004 RQ_{224}	—	September 8, 2004	Campo Imperatore	CINEOS	·	2.6 km	MPC · JPL
329827	2004 RX_{242}	—	September 10, 2004	Kitt Peak	Spacewatch	·	2.4 km	MPC · JPL
329828	2004 RV_{261}	—	September 10, 2004	Kitt Peak	Spacewatch	·	2.9 km	MPC · JPL
329829	2004 RE_{292}	—	September 10, 2004	Socorro	LINEAR	·	2.4 km	MPC · JPL
329830	2004 RX_{321}	—	September 13, 2004	Socorro	LINEAR	DOR	3.6 km	MPC · JPL
329831	2004 RT_{324}	—	September 13, 2004	Socorro	LINEAR	·	5.7 km	MPC · JPL
329832	2004 RO_{326}	—	September 13, 2004	Palomar	NEAT	·	2.1 km	MPC · JPL
329833	2004 RE_{341}	—	September 11, 2004	Socorro	LINEAR	·	2.9 km	MPC · JPL
329834	2004 RY_{346}	—	September 13, 2004	Socorro	LINEAR	·	2.6 km	MPC · JPL
329835	2004 SY_{10}	—	September 16, 2004	Siding Spring	SSS	·	4.3 km	MPC · JPL
329836	2004 SJ_{18}	—	September 17, 2004	Anderson Mesa	LONEOS	GEF	1.8 km	MPC · JPL
329837	2004 SH_{42}	—	September 18, 2004	Socorro	LINEAR	·	2.2 km	MPC · JPL
329838	2004 SM_{58}	—	September 16, 2004	Anderson Mesa	LONEOS	·	1.4 km	MPC · JPL
329839	2004 TC_{35}	—	September 9, 2004	Kitt Peak	Spacewatch	·	2.5 km	MPC · JPL
329840	2004 TN_{41}	—	October 4, 2004	Kitt Peak	Spacewatch	·	3.0 km	MPC · JPL
329841	2004 TW_{46}	—	October 4, 2004	Kitt Peak	Spacewatch	·	2.8 km	MPC · JPL
329842	2004 TY_{50}	—	October 4, 2004	Kitt Peak	Spacewatch	·	3.0 km	MPC · JPL
329843	2004 TQ_{64}	—	September 7, 2004	Kitt Peak	Spacewatch	·	2.2 km	MPC · JPL
329844	2004 TM_{75}	—	October 6, 2004	Kitt Peak	Spacewatch	·	1.9 km	MPC · JPL
329845	2004 TU_{91}	—	October 5, 2004	Kitt Peak	Spacewatch	HOF	2.3 km	MPC · JPL
329846	2004 TY_{96}	—	October 5, 2004	Kitt Peak	Spacewatch	·	1.6 km	MPC · JPL
329847	2004 TW_{109}	—	October 7, 2004	Anderson Mesa	LONEOS	·	2.6 km	MPC · JPL
329848	2004 TV_{125}	—	October 7, 2004	Socorro	LINEAR	·	2.7 km	MPC · JPL
329849	2004 TP_{134}	—	October 8, 2004	Anderson Mesa	LONEOS	·	710 m	MPC · JPL
329850	2004 TS_{165}	—	October 7, 2004	Kitt Peak	Spacewatch	·	2.0 km	MPC · JPL
329851	2004 TK_{192}	—	October 7, 2004	Kitt Peak	Spacewatch	KOR	1.2 km	MPC · JPL
329852	2004 TV_{247}	—	October 7, 2004	Socorro	LINEAR	JUN	1.6 km	MPC · JPL
329853	2004 TO_{262}	—	October 9, 2004	Socorro	LINEAR	·	3.4 km	MPC · JPL
329854	2004 TQ_{290}	—	October 10, 2004	Kitt Peak	Spacewatch	·	2.4 km	MPC · JPL
329855	2004 TD_{308}	—	October 10, 2004	Socorro	LINEAR	·	3.1 km	MPC · JPL
329856	2004 TX_{356}	—	October 14, 2004	Anderson Mesa	LONEOS	EUN	1.9 km	MPC · JPL
329857	2004 TY_{368}	—	October 7, 2004	Kitt Peak	Spacewatch	·	4.2 km	MPC · JPL
329858	2004 VS_{23}	—	November 5, 2004	Palomar	NEAT	·	3.2 km	MPC · JPL
329859	2004 VK_{25}	—	November 4, 2004	Anderson Mesa	LONEOS	·	2.6 km	MPC · JPL
329860	2004 VH_{29}	—	November 3, 2004	Kitt Peak	Spacewatch	·	5.1 km	MPC · JPL
329861	2004 VK_{82}	—	November 9, 2004	Catalina	CSS	·	3.2 km	MPC · JPL
329862	2004 XW_{9}	—	December 2, 2004	Catalina	CSS	·	2.5 km	MPC · JPL
329863	2004 XQ_{29}	—	December 8, 2004	Socorro	LINEAR	·	4.8 km	MPC · JPL
329864	2004 XX_{59}	—	December 11, 2004	Kitt Peak	Spacewatch	·	2.7 km	MPC · JPL
329865	2004 XT_{61}	—	November 20, 2004	Kitt Peak	Spacewatch	·	3.6 km	MPC · JPL
329866	2004 XM_{103}	—	December 9, 2004	Socorro	LINEAR	·	3.6 km	MPC · JPL
329867	2004 XK_{132}	—	December 13, 2004	Kitt Peak	Spacewatch	EOS	2.8 km	MPC · JPL
329868	2004 XE_{143}	—	December 9, 2004	Kitt Peak	Spacewatch	·	5.2 km	MPC · JPL
329869	2004 XF_{160}	—	December 14, 2004	Kitt Peak	Spacewatch	LIX	3.3 km	MPC · JPL
329870	2004 YE_{22}	—	December 18, 2004	Mount Lemmon	Mount Lemmon Survey	·	620 m	MPC · JPL
329871	2005 AX_{3}	—	January 1, 2005	Catalina	CSS	EOS	3.0 km	MPC · JPL
329872	2005 AA_{15}	—	January 6, 2005	Socorro	LINEAR	·	4.0 km	MPC · JPL
329873	2005 AL_{18}	—	January 6, 2005	Catalina	CSS	EUP	6.0 km	MPC · JPL
329874	2005 AR_{26}	—	January 6, 2005	Socorro	LINEAR	·	3.8 km	MPC · JPL
329875	2005 AK_{82}	—	January 13, 2005	Catalina	CSS	·	5.8 km	MPC · JPL
329876	2005 BT_{2}	—	January 19, 2005	Wrightwood	J. W. Young	EOS	2.1 km	MPC · JPL
329877	2005 BO_{23}	—	January 16, 2005	Kitt Peak	Spacewatch	VER	4.0 km	MPC · JPL
329878	2005 BB_{28}	—	January 16, 2005	Bergisch Gladbach	Bergisch Gladbach	·	1.4 km	MPC · JPL
329879	2005 CS_{15}	—	January 13, 2005	Socorro	LINEAR	·	5.0 km	MPC · JPL
329880	2005 CZ_{28}	—	February 1, 2005	Kitt Peak	Spacewatch	·	690 m	MPC · JPL
329881	2005 EN_{17}	—	March 3, 2005	Kitt Peak	Spacewatch	·	770 m	MPC · JPL
329882	2005 ER_{20}	—	March 3, 2005	Catalina	CSS	·	780 m	MPC · JPL
329883	2005 EX_{107}	—	March 4, 2005	Mount Lemmon	Mount Lemmon Survey	·	3.4 km	MPC · JPL
329884	2005 EO_{147}	—	March 10, 2005	Mount Lemmon	Mount Lemmon Survey	·	880 m	MPC · JPL
329885	2005 EL_{149}	—	March 10, 2005	Kitt Peak	Spacewatch	·	820 m	MPC · JPL
329886	2005 EK_{167}	—	March 4, 2005	Kitt Peak	Spacewatch	·	870 m	MPC · JPL
329887	2005 EL_{184}	—	March 9, 2005	Mount Lemmon	Mount Lemmon Survey	·	1.0 km	MPC · JPL
329888	2005 EU_{230}	—	March 10, 2005	Mount Lemmon	Mount Lemmon Survey	·	810 m	MPC · JPL
329889	2005 ES_{245}	—	March 12, 2005	Kitt Peak	Spacewatch	·	650 m	MPC · JPL
329890	2005 ER_{274}	—	March 11, 2005	Kitt Peak	Spacewatch	·	1.3 km	MPC · JPL
329891	2005 GH_{5}	—	April 1, 2005	Kitt Peak	Spacewatch	·	830 m	MPC · JPL
329892	2005 GB_{30}	—	April 4, 2005	Catalina	CSS	(2076)	1.1 km	MPC · JPL
329893	2005 GU_{36}	—	April 2, 2005	Mount Lemmon	Mount Lemmon Survey	·	830 m	MPC · JPL
329894	2005 GD_{38}	—	November 24, 2003	Kitt Peak	Spacewatch	·	980 m	MPC · JPL
329895	2005 GF_{44}	—	April 5, 2005	Anderson Mesa	LONEOS	·	860 m	MPC · JPL
329896	2005 GA_{115}	—	April 10, 2005	Mount Lemmon	Mount Lemmon Survey	V	750 m	MPC · JPL
329897	2005 GY_{132}	—	April 10, 2005	Kitt Peak	Spacewatch	·	800 m	MPC · JPL
329898	2005 GE_{137}	—	April 11, 2005	Kitt Peak	Spacewatch	·	800 m	MPC · JPL
329899	2005 GV_{162}	—	April 12, 2005	Anderson Mesa	LONEOS	·	820 m	MPC · JPL
329900	2005 HT_{9}	—	April 30, 2005	Kitt Peak	Spacewatch	V	700 m	MPC · JPL

== 329901–330000 ==
back to top

Designation			Discovery			Properties		Ref
Permanent	Provisional	Named after	Date	Site	Discoverer(s)	Category	Diam.	Ref
329901	2005 JQ_{1}	—	May 3, 2005	Kitt Peak	Spacewatch	·	1.2 km	MPC · JPL
329902	2005 JS_{47}	—	May 3, 2005	Kitt Peak	Spacewatch	·	770 m	MPC · JPL
329903	2005 JC_{85}	—	May 8, 2005	Kitt Peak	Spacewatch	·	880 m	MPC · JPL
329904	2005 JW_{89}	—	May 11, 2005	Mount Lemmon	Mount Lemmon Survey	·	630 m	MPC · JPL
329905	2005 JC_{100}	—	May 9, 2005	Kitt Peak	Spacewatch	·	910 m	MPC · JPL
329906	2005 JM_{107}	—	May 12, 2005	Mount Lemmon	Mount Lemmon Survey	·	810 m	MPC · JPL
329907	2005 JZ_{111}	—	May 9, 2005	Mount Lemmon	Mount Lemmon Survey	·	770 m	MPC · JPL
329908	2005 JE_{116}	—	May 10, 2005	Kitt Peak	Spacewatch	·	920 m	MPC · JPL
329909	2005 JV_{117}	—	May 10, 2005	Kitt Peak	Spacewatch	·	1.5 km	MPC · JPL
329910	2005 JY_{175}	—	May 3, 2005	Catalina	CSS	PHO	950 m	MPC · JPL
329911	2005 JA_{182}	—	May 4, 2005	Kitt Peak	Spacewatch	·	770 m	MPC · JPL
329912	2005 LC_{8}	—	June 6, 2005	Siding Spring	SSS	·	1.5 km	MPC · JPL
329913	2005 LD_{17}	—	June 6, 2005	Kitt Peak	Spacewatch	·	850 m	MPC · JPL
329914	2005 LN_{18}	—	June 6, 2005	Kitt Peak	Spacewatch	V	550 m	MPC · JPL
329915	2005 MB	—	June 16, 2005	Siding Spring	SSS	ATE +1km	1.0 km	MPC · JPL
329916	2005 MX_{7}	—	June 27, 2005	Kitt Peak	Spacewatch	·	1.6 km	MPC · JPL
329917	2005 MG_{37}	—	June 30, 2005	Kitt Peak	Spacewatch	·	1.3 km	MPC · JPL
329918	2005 MN_{41}	—	June 30, 2005	Kitt Peak	Spacewatch	·	1.3 km	MPC · JPL
329919	2005 MM_{51}	—	June 30, 2005	Kitt Peak	Spacewatch	T_{j} (2.98) · HIL · 3:2	9.2 km	MPC · JPL
329920	2005 NP	—	July 2, 2005	Kitt Peak	Spacewatch	·	1.3 km	MPC · JPL
329921	2005 NA_{13}	—	July 4, 2005	Palomar	NEAT	3:2 · SHU	6.9 km	MPC · JPL
329922	2005 NS_{13}	—	July 5, 2005	Kitt Peak	Spacewatch	·	1.5 km	MPC · JPL
329923	2005 NK_{20}	—	July 3, 2005	Catalina	CSS	·	1.5 km	MPC · JPL
329924	2005 NP_{21}	—	July 1, 2005	Kitt Peak	Spacewatch	T_{j} (2.98) · 3:2	5.6 km	MPC · JPL
329925	2005 NO_{33}	—	July 5, 2005	Kitt Peak	Spacewatch	NYS	890 m	MPC · JPL
329926	2005 NS_{43}	—	July 6, 2005	Kitt Peak	Spacewatch	·	1.2 km	MPC · JPL
329927	2005 NN_{78}	—	July 11, 2005	Kitt Peak	Spacewatch	3:2	5.8 km	MPC · JPL
329928	2005 NF_{81}	—	July 9, 2005	Kitt Peak	Spacewatch	·	1.3 km	MPC · JPL
329929	2005 NO_{102}	—	July 8, 2005	Kitt Peak	Spacewatch	·	1.3 km	MPC · JPL
329930	2005 NS_{123}	—	July 12, 2005	Mount Lemmon	Mount Lemmon Survey	NYS	1.3 km	MPC · JPL
329931	2005 OP_{5}	—	July 28, 2005	Palomar	NEAT	·	1.2 km	MPC · JPL
329932	2005 OQ_{5}	—	July 28, 2005	Palomar	NEAT	NYS	1.2 km	MPC · JPL
329933	2005 OP_{8}	—	July 28, 2005	Palomar	NEAT	·	940 m	MPC · JPL
329934	2005 OY_{14}	—	July 27, 2005	Reedy Creek	J. Broughton	V	800 m	MPC · JPL
329935 Prévôt	2005 OH_{19}	Prévôt	July 30, 2005	Vicques	M. Ory	·	1.3 km	MPC · JPL
329936	2005 OC_{20}	—	July 28, 2005	Palomar	NEAT	NYS	960 m	MPC · JPL
329937	2005 PC_{4}	—	August 6, 2005	Socorro	LINEAR	·	1.1 km	MPC · JPL
329938	2005 PF_{9}	—	August 4, 2005	Palomar	NEAT	T_{j} (2.98) · 3:2	5.6 km	MPC · JPL
329939	2005 PF_{19}	—	August 3, 2005	Needville	P. G. A. Garossino, D. Wells	3:2	5.3 km	MPC · JPL
329940	2005 QG_{10}	—	August 25, 2005	Campo Imperatore	CINEOS	·	1.6 km	MPC · JPL
329941	2005 QT_{11}	—	August 22, 2005	Palomar	NEAT	(2076)	1.0 km	MPC · JPL
329942	2005 QG_{14}	—	August 25, 2005	Palomar	NEAT	PHO	1.2 km	MPC · JPL
329943	2005 QP_{15}	—	August 25, 2005	Palomar	NEAT	·	1.2 km	MPC · JPL
329944	2005 QD_{30}	—	August 29, 2005	Anderson Mesa	LONEOS	NYS	1.2 km	MPC · JPL
329945	2005 QB_{31}	—	August 22, 2005	Palomar	NEAT	·	1.5 km	MPC · JPL
329946	2005 QW_{36}	—	August 25, 2005	Palomar	NEAT	NYS	1.3 km	MPC · JPL
329947	2005 QA_{39}	—	August 26, 2005	Campo Imperatore	CINEOS	MAS	840 m	MPC · JPL
329948	2005 QK_{39}	—	August 26, 2005	Anderson Mesa	LONEOS	·	1.5 km	MPC · JPL
329949	2005 QM_{46}	—	August 26, 2005	Palomar	NEAT	·	1.1 km	MPC · JPL
329950	2005 QB_{54}	—	August 28, 2005	Kitt Peak	Spacewatch	·	1.3 km	MPC · JPL
329951	2005 QW_{57}	—	August 24, 2005	Siding Spring	SSS	·	1.5 km	MPC · JPL
329952	2005 QD_{62}	—	August 26, 2005	Palomar	NEAT	·	1.0 km	MPC · JPL
329953	2005 QJ_{65}	—	August 26, 2005	Palomar	NEAT	·	1.2 km	MPC · JPL
329954	2005 QD_{70}	—	August 29, 2005	Socorro	LINEAR	NYS	1.2 km	MPC · JPL
329955	2005 QK_{72}	—	August 29, 2005	Kitt Peak	Spacewatch	·	1.7 km	MPC · JPL
329956	2005 QW_{101}	—	August 27, 2005	Palomar	NEAT	·	1.3 km	MPC · JPL
329957	2005 QZ_{108}	—	August 27, 2005	Palomar	NEAT	MAR	960 m	MPC · JPL
329958	2005 QX_{123}	—	August 28, 2005	Kitt Peak	Spacewatch	·	3.0 km	MPC · JPL
329959	2005 QG_{143}	—	August 29, 2005	Anderson Mesa	LONEOS	NYS	1.1 km	MPC · JPL
329960	2005 QN_{143}	—	January 29, 2003	Apache Point	SDSS	·	890 m	MPC · JPL
329961	2005 QS_{151}	—	August 31, 2005	Socorro	LINEAR	·	1.4 km	MPC · JPL
329962	2005 QE_{158}	—	August 26, 2005	Palomar	NEAT	·	1.2 km	MPC · JPL
329963	2005 QH_{158}	—	August 26, 2005	Palomar	NEAT	·	1.3 km	MPC · JPL
329964	2005 QZ_{165}	—	August 31, 2005	Palomar	NEAT	·	1.7 km	MPC · JPL
329965	2005 RG_{16}	—	September 1, 2005	Kitt Peak	Spacewatch	(5)	1.3 km	MPC · JPL
329966	2005 RL_{45}	—	September 14, 2005	Socorro	LINEAR	EUN	1.5 km	MPC · JPL
329967	2005 SA_{24}	—	September 24, 2005	Anderson Mesa	LONEOS	·	2.4 km	MPC · JPL
329968	2005 SG_{29}	—	September 23, 2005	Kitt Peak	Spacewatch	·	1.4 km	MPC · JPL
329969	2005 SJ_{36}	—	September 24, 2005	Kitt Peak	Spacewatch	MAS	790 m	MPC · JPL
329970	2005 SG_{52}	—	September 24, 2005	Kitt Peak	Spacewatch	·	2.2 km	MPC · JPL
329971	2005 SS_{69}	—	September 27, 2005	Socorro	LINEAR	·	1.9 km	MPC · JPL
329972	2005 SF_{77}	—	September 24, 2005	Kitt Peak	Spacewatch	·	1.6 km	MPC · JPL
329973	2005 SN_{78}	—	September 24, 2005	Kitt Peak	Spacewatch	·	1.1 km	MPC · JPL
329974	2005 SP_{78}	—	September 24, 2005	Kitt Peak	Spacewatch	·	1.3 km	MPC · JPL
329975	2005 SW_{99}	—	September 25, 2005	Kitt Peak	Spacewatch	·	1.8 km	MPC · JPL
329976	2005 SB_{102}	—	September 25, 2005	Kitt Peak	Spacewatch	·	2.3 km	MPC · JPL
329977	2005 SS_{120}	—	September 29, 2005	Kitt Peak	Spacewatch	·	1.7 km	MPC · JPL
329978	2005 SC_{135}	—	September 24, 2005	Kitt Peak	Spacewatch	AGN	1.0 km	MPC · JPL
329979	2005 SK_{149}	—	September 25, 2005	Kitt Peak	Spacewatch	·	1.5 km	MPC · JPL
329980	2005 SW_{156}	—	September 26, 2005	Kitt Peak	Spacewatch	·	1.6 km	MPC · JPL
329981	2005 SV_{167}	—	September 29, 2005	Kitt Peak	Spacewatch	H	610 m	MPC · JPL
329982	2005 SP_{173}	—	September 29, 2005	Kitt Peak	Spacewatch	·	1.9 km	MPC · JPL
329983	2005 SY_{197}	—	September 30, 2005	Mount Lemmon	Mount Lemmon Survey	·	1.5 km	MPC · JPL
329984	2005 SN_{226}	—	September 30, 2005	Kitt Peak	Spacewatch	MAS	760 m	MPC · JPL
329985	2005 SY_{229}	—	September 30, 2005	Mount Lemmon	Mount Lemmon Survey	(7744)	1.5 km	MPC · JPL
329986	2005 SU_{235}	—	September 29, 2005	Kitt Peak	Spacewatch	·	1.3 km	MPC · JPL
329987	2005 SD_{237}	—	September 29, 2005	Kitt Peak	Spacewatch	MAR	1.4 km	MPC · JPL
329988	2005 ST_{272}	—	September 30, 2005	Mount Lemmon	Mount Lemmon Survey	·	920 m	MPC · JPL
329989	2005 SC_{279}	—	September 29, 2005	Kitt Peak	Spacewatch	·	2.4 km	MPC · JPL
329990	2005 ST_{283}	—	January 28, 2007	Mount Lemmon	Mount Lemmon Survey	·	1.2 km	MPC · JPL
329991	2005 TA_{19}	—	October 1, 2005	Mount Lemmon	Mount Lemmon Survey	·	1.4 km	MPC · JPL
329992	2005 TM_{52}	—	October 11, 2005	Uccle	P. De Cat	·	2.2 km	MPC · JPL
329993	2005 TM_{54}	—	October 1, 2005	Catalina	CSS	·	1.9 km	MPC · JPL
329994	2005 TV_{57}	—	October 1, 2005	Mount Lemmon	Mount Lemmon Survey	·	1.4 km	MPC · JPL
329995	2005 TH_{60}	—	October 3, 2005	Kitt Peak	Spacewatch	·	2.0 km	MPC · JPL
329996	2005 TO_{63}	—	October 6, 2005	Kitt Peak	Spacewatch	·	1.9 km	MPC · JPL
329997	2005 TA_{74}	—	October 7, 2005	Anderson Mesa	LONEOS	(5)	1.4 km	MPC · JPL
329998	2005 TM_{87}	—	October 5, 2005	Kitt Peak	Spacewatch	·	850 m	MPC · JPL
329999	2005 TO_{93}	—	October 6, 2005	Anderson Mesa	LONEOS	·	1.5 km	MPC · JPL
330000	2005 TO_{95}	—	October 6, 2005	Kitt Peak	Spacewatch	MRX	1.2 km	MPC · JPL

back to top

== See also ==
- Meanings of minor-planet names: 329001–330000
