= Meanings of minor-planet names: 330001–331000 =

As minor planet discoveries are confirmed, they are given a permanent number by the IAU's Minor Planet Center (MPC), and the discoverers can then submit names for them, following the IAU's naming conventions. The list below concerns those minor planets in the specified number-range that have received names, and explains the meanings of those names.

Official naming citations of newly named small Solar System bodies are approved and published in a bulletin by IAU's Working Group for Small Bodies Nomenclature (WGSBN). Before May 2021, citations were published in MPC's Minor Planet Circulars for many decades. Recent citations can also be found on the JPL Small-Body Database (SBDB). Until his death in 2016, German astronomer Lutz D. Schmadel compiled these citations into the Dictionary of Minor Planet Names (DMP) and regularly updated the collection.

Based on Paul Herget's The Names of the Minor Planets, Schmadel also researched the unclear origin of numerous asteroids, most of which had been named prior to World War II. This article incorporates text from this source, which is in the public domain: SBDB New namings may only be added to this list below after official publication as the preannouncement of names is condemned. The WGSBN publishes a comprehensive guideline for the naming rules of non-cometary small Solar System bodies.

== 330001–330100 ==
Named minor planet	Provisional	This minor planet was named for...	Ref · Catalog
There are no named minor planets in this number range

== 330101–330200 ==
back to top

Named minor planet	Provisional	This minor planet was named for...	Ref · Catalog
There are no named minor planets in this number range

== 330201–330300 ==
back to top

Named minor planet	Provisional	This minor planet was named for...	Ref · Catalog
There are no named minor planets in this number range

== 330301–330400 ==
back to top

Named minor planet	Provisional	This minor planet was named for...	Ref · Catalog
There are no named minor planets in this number range

== 330401–330500 ==
back to top

Named minor planet	Provisional	This minor planet was named for...	Ref · Catalog
330420 Tomroman	2007 CG_{26}	Thomas A. Roman (born 1952), a professor at Central Connecticut State University.	JPL · 330420
330440 Davinadon	2007 DQ_{60}	Davina O'Brien (born 1949) and Donovan Edward O'Brien (born 1945), of Tea Gardens, Australia, are friends of the discoverer, Andrew Lowe.	JPL · 330440
330455 Anbrysse	2007 EV_{31}	An Brysse (born 1969), the most successful participant in the "Run to the moon" (Dutch: Loop naar de maan), a fund-raising event for Belgian cancer research in 2016, and for all the people who lost their fight, those who are still fighting and the ones who will have to fight cancer.	JPL · 330455

== 330501–330600 ==
back to top

Named minor planet	Provisional	This minor planet was named for...	Ref · Catalog
There are no named minor planets in this number range

== 330601–330700 ==
back to top

Named minor planet	Provisional	This minor planet was named for...	Ref · Catalog
330634 Boico	2008 EY_{131}	Vladimir Boico (1909–2001), a Romanian amateur astronomer.	JPL · 330634
330640 Yangxuejun	2008 FX_{2}	Yang Xuejun (born 1963), is an academician of the Chinese Academy of Sciences. He designed the world's first practical CPU-GPU heterogeneous architecture and developed the "Tianhe" high-performance computer system for China, leading the World TOP500 board on seven occasions.	IAU · 330640

== 330701–330800 ==
back to top

Named minor planet	Provisional	This minor planet was named for...	Ref · Catalog
330712 Rhodescolossus	2008 PR_{1}	The Colossus of Rhodes was a tall statue of the Greek god Helios and one of the Seven Wonders of the Ancient World. It built in the city of Rhodes during the 3rd century BC.	IAU · 330712

== 330801–330900 ==
back to top

Named minor planet	Provisional	This minor planet was named for...	Ref · Catalog
330836 Orius	2009 HW_{77}	The centaur Orius, who lived in the mountains, was killed by Heracles when he tried to steal the wine of Pholus.	JPL · 330836
330856 Ernsthelene	2009 QT_{9}	Ernst (1920–1997) and Helene Kling (1919–2003), parents of German co-discoverer Rainer Kling	JPL · 330856

== 330901–331000 ==
back to top

Named minor planet	Provisional	This minor planet was named for...	Ref · Catalog
330934 Natevanwey	2009 SX_{228}	Nate Van Wey (born 1950), high school teacher of physics at Perry High School for 42 years and recognized for all of the student's lives he has influenced	JPL · 330934

back to top

Preceded by 329,001–330,000	Meanings of minor-planet names List of minor planets: 330,001–331,000	Succeeded by 331,001–332,000
