= List of minor planets: 331001–332000 =

The following is a partial list of minor planets, running from minor-planet number 331001 through 332000, inclusive. The primary data for this and other partial lists is based on JPL's "Small-Body Orbital Elements" and data available from the Minor Planet Center. Critical list information is also provided by the MPC, unless otherwise specified from Lowell Observatory. A detailed description of the table's columns and additional sources are given on the main page including a complete list of every page in this series, and a statistical break-up on the dynamical classification of minor planets.

Also see the summary list of all named bodies in numerical and alphabetical order, and the corresponding naming citations for the number range of this particular list. New namings may only be added to this list after official publication, as the preannouncement of names is condemned by the Working Group for Small Bodies Nomenclature of the International Astronomical Union.

Near-Earth obj.	MBA (inner)	MBA (outer)	Centaur
Mars-crosser	MBA (middle)	Jupiter trojan	Trans-Neptunian obj.
Unclassified

== 331001–331100 ==
Designation			Discovery			Properties		Ref
Permanent	Provisional	Named after	Date	Site	Discoverer(s)	Category	Diam.	Ref
331001	2009 US_{57}	—	January 26, 2006	Kitt Peak	Spacewatch	·	1.7 km	MPC · JPL
331002	2009 UN_{69}	—	October 21, 2009	Catalina	CSS	·	1.2 km	MPC · JPL
331003	2009 UA_{70}	—	October 22, 2009	Mount Lemmon	Mount Lemmon Survey	·	2.1 km	MPC · JPL
331004	2009 US_{73}	—	October 18, 2009	Mount Lemmon	Mount Lemmon Survey	KOR	1.4 km	MPC · JPL
331005	2009 UU_{81}	—	October 22, 2009	Mount Lemmon	Mount Lemmon Survey	·	3.2 km	MPC · JPL
331006	2009 UA_{83}	—	October 23, 2009	Mount Lemmon	Mount Lemmon Survey	·	3.1 km	MPC · JPL
331007	2009 UU_{86}	—	October 24, 2009	Catalina	CSS	·	2.5 km	MPC · JPL
331008	2009 UO_{88}	—	October 21, 2009	Catalina	CSS	·	2.8 km	MPC · JPL
331009	2009 UG_{91}	—	October 17, 2009	Catalina	CSS	·	2.8 km	MPC · JPL
331010	2009 UM_{91}	—	October 18, 2009	Catalina	CSS	·	2.5 km	MPC · JPL
331011 Peccioli	2009 UF_{94}	Peccioli	October 26, 2009	Libbiano	P. Bacci, Biasci, F.	·	1.8 km	MPC · JPL
331012	2009 UL_{100}	—	October 23, 2009	Mount Lemmon	Mount Lemmon Survey	HYG	3.2 km	MPC · JPL
331013	2009 UJ_{104}	—	September 27, 2009	Kitt Peak	Spacewatch	·	4.8 km	MPC · JPL
331014	2009 UN_{120}	—	October 23, 2009	Mount Lemmon	Mount Lemmon Survey	·	3.0 km	MPC · JPL
331015	2009 UW_{132}	—	October 18, 2009	Catalina	CSS	·	2.4 km	MPC · JPL
331016	2009 UW_{134}	—	October 23, 2009	Kitt Peak	Spacewatch	·	4.5 km	MPC · JPL
331017	2009 UF_{136}	—	October 25, 2009	Kitt Peak	Spacewatch	BRA	1.8 km	MPC · JPL
331018	2009 UO_{136}	—	October 24, 2009	Catalina	CSS	·	2.7 km	MPC · JPL
331019	2009 UT_{136}	—	October 24, 2009	Catalina	CSS	·	2.5 km	MPC · JPL
331020	2009 UP_{139}	—	October 26, 2009	La Sagra	OAM	T_{j} (2.98) · EUP	6.1 km	MPC · JPL
331021	2009 UY_{143}	—	October 22, 2009	Mount Lemmon	Mount Lemmon Survey	AST	2.7 km	MPC · JPL
331022	2009 UV_{146}	—	October 27, 2009	Kitt Peak	Spacewatch	·	2.7 km	MPC · JPL
331023	2009 UG_{150}	—	October 19, 2009	Socorro	LINEAR	·	1.3 km	MPC · JPL
331024	2009 UP_{151}	—	October 18, 2009	Catalina	CSS	(5)	1.4 km	MPC · JPL
331025	2009 VG_{4}	—	November 8, 2009	Kitt Peak	Spacewatch	·	3.7 km	MPC · JPL
331026	2009 VM_{7}	—	November 8, 2009	Catalina	CSS	·	4.5 km	MPC · JPL
331027	2009 VH_{8}	—	November 8, 2009	Kitt Peak	Spacewatch	·	4.2 km	MPC · JPL
331028	2009 VJ_{8}	—	November 8, 2009	Mount Lemmon	Mount Lemmon Survey	·	2.1 km	MPC · JPL
331029	2009 VC_{28}	—	November 8, 2009	Catalina	CSS	·	2.5 km	MPC · JPL
331030	2009 VD_{28}	—	November 8, 2009	Catalina	CSS	EOS	2.5 km	MPC · JPL
331031	2009 VN_{37}	—	November 8, 2009	Kitt Peak	Spacewatch	EMA	4.9 km	MPC · JPL
331032	2009 VM_{40}	—	November 8, 2009	Catalina	CSS	(5)	1.6 km	MPC · JPL
331033	2009 VR_{41}	—	November 9, 2009	Mount Lemmon	Mount Lemmon Survey	(22805)	4.7 km	MPC · JPL
331034	2009 VV_{47}	—	November 9, 2009	Mount Lemmon	Mount Lemmon Survey	·	2.2 km	MPC · JPL
331035	2009 VF_{48}	—	November 9, 2009	Mount Lemmon	Mount Lemmon Survey	·	3.2 km	MPC · JPL
331036	2009 VX_{49}	—	November 11, 2009	La Sagra	OAM	·	2.9 km	MPC · JPL
331037	2009 VM_{50}	—	November 13, 2009	La Sagra	OAM	·	3.3 km	MPC · JPL
331038	2009 VN_{50}	—	November 13, 2009	La Sagra	OAM	(5)	1.8 km	MPC · JPL
331039	2009 VG_{53}	—	November 10, 2009	Mount Lemmon	Mount Lemmon Survey	·	2.0 km	MPC · JPL
331040	2009 VC_{56}	—	September 22, 2009	Mount Lemmon	Mount Lemmon Survey	MRX	1.2 km	MPC · JPL
331041	2009 VE_{60}	—	November 9, 2009	Catalina	CSS	·	2.6 km	MPC · JPL
331042	2009 VG_{61}	—	November 8, 2009	Kitt Peak	Spacewatch	·	4.7 km	MPC · JPL
331043	2009 VX_{61}	—	November 8, 2009	Kitt Peak	Spacewatch	EOS	2.2 km	MPC · JPL
331044	2009 VQ_{72}	—	November 15, 2009	Socorro	LINEAR	·	2.3 km	MPC · JPL
331045	2009 VZ_{73}	—	November 11, 2009	Mount Lemmon	Mount Lemmon Survey	·	1.7 km	MPC · JPL
331046	2009 VE_{77}	—	November 8, 2009	Catalina	CSS	·	3.7 km	MPC · JPL
331047	2009 VQ_{86}	—	November 10, 2009	Kitt Peak	Spacewatch	EOS ·	3.7 km	MPC · JPL
331048	2009 VD_{93}	—	November 9, 2009	Catalina	CSS	·	4.3 km	MPC · JPL
331049	2009 VV_{100}	—	November 10, 2009	Kitt Peak	Spacewatch	EOS	2.3 km	MPC · JPL
331050	2009 VH_{107}	—	November 8, 2009	Mount Lemmon	Mount Lemmon Survey	L4 · ERY	13 km	MPC · JPL
331051	2009 VQ_{108}	—	November 30, 2005	Kitt Peak	Spacewatch	PAD	2.3 km	MPC · JPL
331052	2009 VF_{110}	—	November 9, 2009	Catalina	CSS	·	3.3 km	MPC · JPL
331053	2009 VQ_{113}	—	November 11, 2009	Mount Lemmon	Mount Lemmon Survey	·	2.1 km	MPC · JPL
331054	2009 VO_{115}	—	October 25, 2009	Mount Lemmon	Mount Lemmon Survey	·	4.5 km	MPC · JPL
331055	2009 WJ	—	November 16, 2009	Mayhill	Mayhill	·	930 m	MPC · JPL
331056	2009 WX	—	November 17, 2009	Tzec Maun	D. Chestnov, A. Novichonok	·	2.5 km	MPC · JPL
331057	2009 WR_{2}	—	October 26, 2009	Kitt Peak	Spacewatch	·	1.6 km	MPC · JPL
331058	2009 WC_{7}	—	November 18, 2009	Marly	P. Kocher	·	2.6 km	MPC · JPL
331059	2009 WX_{8}	—	November 17, 2009	Socorro	LINEAR	·	5.4 km	MPC · JPL
331060	2009 WY_{11}	—	April 18, 2007	Mount Lemmon	Mount Lemmon Survey	(16286)	2.2 km	MPC · JPL
331061	2009 WY_{13}	—	October 23, 2009	Mount Lemmon	Mount Lemmon Survey	(5)	1.2 km	MPC · JPL
331062	2009 WA_{16}	—	November 16, 2009	La Sagra	OAM	·	2.0 km	MPC · JPL
331063	2009 WD_{22}	—	November 18, 2009	Kachina	Hobart, J.	·	2.0 km	MPC · JPL
331064	2009 WW_{24}	—	November 21, 2009	Mayhill	Lowe, A.	·	2.4 km	MPC · JPL
331065	2009 WV_{27}	—	November 16, 2009	Kitt Peak	Spacewatch	KOR	1.4 km	MPC · JPL
331066	2009 WX_{27}	—	November 16, 2009	Kitt Peak	Spacewatch	·	1.6 km	MPC · JPL
331067	2009 WP_{38}	—	November 17, 2009	Kitt Peak	Spacewatch	EOS	2.0 km	MPC · JPL
331068	2009 WZ_{44}	—	October 25, 2009	Kitt Peak	Spacewatch	·	3.4 km	MPC · JPL
331069	2009 WD_{50}	—	November 19, 2009	Kitt Peak	Spacewatch	·	5.8 km	MPC · JPL
331070	2009 WK_{51}	—	November 20, 2009	Mount Lemmon	Mount Lemmon Survey	EOS	2.4 km	MPC · JPL
331071	2009 WO_{52}	—	November 19, 2009	La Sagra	OAM	·	2.2 km	MPC · JPL
331072	2009 WY_{58}	—	September 7, 2004	Kitt Peak	Spacewatch	·	1.6 km	MPC · JPL
331073	2009 WU_{64}	—	September 30, 2003	Kitt Peak	Spacewatch	·	3.1 km	MPC · JPL
331074	2009 WF_{66}	—	October 23, 2009	Mount Lemmon	Mount Lemmon Survey	KOR	1.4 km	MPC · JPL
331075	2009 WV_{70}	—	November 18, 2009	Kitt Peak	Spacewatch	·	2.7 km	MPC · JPL
331076	2009 WE_{72}	—	November 18, 2009	Kitt Peak	Spacewatch	EOS	1.9 km	MPC · JPL
331077	2009 WA_{73}	—	November 18, 2009	Kitt Peak	Spacewatch	EOS	2.1 km	MPC · JPL
331078	2009 WD_{93}	—	November 19, 2009	La Sagra	OAM	EOS	2.4 km	MPC · JPL
331079	2009 WO_{94}	—	November 20, 2009	Mount Lemmon	Mount Lemmon Survey	·	2.5 km	MPC · JPL
331080	2009 WH_{99}	—	November 21, 2009	Kitt Peak	Spacewatch	·	2.2 km	MPC · JPL
331081	2009 WW_{100}	—	November 22, 2009	Kitt Peak	Spacewatch	AGN	1.4 km	MPC · JPL
331082	2009 WZ_{103}	—	November 22, 2009	Kitt Peak	Spacewatch	·	3.2 km	MPC · JPL
331083	2009 WM_{107}	—	November 17, 2009	Mount Lemmon	Mount Lemmon Survey	EOS	2.1 km	MPC · JPL
331084	2009 WS_{112}	—	March 16, 2004	Kitt Peak	Spacewatch	·	1.3 km	MPC · JPL
331085	2009 WC_{138}	—	November 23, 2009	Mount Lemmon	Mount Lemmon Survey	·	2.0 km	MPC · JPL
331086	2009 WH_{141}	—	November 18, 2009	Mount Lemmon	Mount Lemmon Survey	·	3.1 km	MPC · JPL
331087	2009 WJ_{150}	—	November 19, 2009	Mount Lemmon	Mount Lemmon Survey	HOF	3.2 km	MPC · JPL
331088	2009 WD_{167}	—	November 21, 2009	Kitt Peak	Spacewatch	·	3.8 km	MPC · JPL
331089	2009 WR_{167}	—	November 22, 2009	Kitt Peak	Spacewatch	EOS	1.9 km	MPC · JPL
331090	2009 WO_{171}	—	November 22, 2009	Mount Lemmon	Mount Lemmon Survey	·	4.8 km	MPC · JPL
331091	2009 WT_{179}	—	November 23, 2009	Kitt Peak	Spacewatch	·	3.5 km	MPC · JPL
331092	2009 WN_{181}	—	November 23, 2009	Mount Lemmon	Mount Lemmon Survey	EOS	2.2 km	MPC · JPL
331093	2009 WA_{182}	—	November 23, 2009	Kitt Peak	Spacewatch	·	4.5 km	MPC · JPL
331094	2009 WW_{185}	—	November 24, 2009	Mount Lemmon	Mount Lemmon Survey	·	2.1 km	MPC · JPL
331095	2009 WK_{188}	—	November 24, 2009	Mount Lemmon	Mount Lemmon Survey	·	3.0 km	MPC · JPL
331096	2009 WY_{192}	—	November 24, 2009	Mount Lemmon	Mount Lemmon Survey	·	2.9 km	MPC · JPL
331097	2009 WS_{193}	—	October 18, 2009	Mount Lemmon	Mount Lemmon Survey	·	5.1 km	MPC · JPL
331098	2009 WV_{193}	—	November 9, 2009	Kitt Peak	Spacewatch	·	3.0 km	MPC · JPL
331099	2009 WS_{198}	—	November 26, 2009	Mount Lemmon	Mount Lemmon Survey	EOS ·	4.6 km	MPC · JPL
331100	2009 WW_{220}	—	October 23, 2009	Kitt Peak	Spacewatch	·	1.7 km	MPC · JPL

== 331101–331200 ==
back to top

Designation			Discovery			Properties		Ref
Permanent	Provisional	Named after	Date	Site	Discoverer(s)	Category	Diam.	Ref
331101	2009 WM_{234}	—	November 19, 2009	Mount Lemmon	Mount Lemmon Survey	·	4.0 km	MPC · JPL
331102	2009 WF_{235}	—	November 20, 2009	Kitt Peak	Spacewatch	·	2.7 km	MPC · JPL
331103	2009 WT_{255}	—	November 20, 2009	Kitt Peak	Spacewatch	·	3.9 km	MPC · JPL
331104	2009 XC_{1}	—	December 10, 2009	Mayhill	Lowe, A.	·	4.5 km	MPC · JPL
331105 Giselher	2009 XG_{9}	Giselher	December 13, 2009	Sonoita (IRO)	R. Kracht	·	1.2 km	MPC · JPL
331106	2010 AN_{66}	—	September 12, 2007	Catalina	CSS	·	3.5 km	MPC · JPL
331107	2010 BS_{118}	—	November 24, 2009	Catalina	CSS	L4	13 km	MPC · JPL
331108	2010 DJ_{51}	—	September 27, 2003	Apache Point	SDSS	·	4.4 km	MPC · JPL
331109	2010 NR_{69}	—	July 14, 2010	WISE	WISE	·	2.6 km	MPC · JPL
331110	2010 OK_{89}	—	March 5, 2008	Mount Lemmon	Mount Lemmon Survey	KON	2.3 km	MPC · JPL
331111	2010 RT_{52}	—	February 25, 2006	Catalina	CSS	H	640 m	MPC · JPL
331112	2010 RY_{62}	—	October 20, 2007	Mount Lemmon	Mount Lemmon Survey	·	660 m	MPC · JPL
331113	2010 RQ_{124}	—	February 7, 2008	Kitt Peak	Spacewatch	AGN	1.5 km	MPC · JPL
331114	2010 RD_{156}	—	December 16, 2007	Mount Lemmon	Mount Lemmon Survey	·	1.5 km	MPC · JPL
331115	2010 ST_{31}	—	September 28, 2003	Socorro	LINEAR	·	960 m	MPC · JPL
331116	2010 TE_{116}	—	March 26, 2001	Anderson Mesa	LONEOS	PHO	1.2 km	MPC · JPL
331117	2010 TY_{180}	—	October 8, 2010	Catalina	CSS	·	780 m	MPC · JPL
331118	2010 UE_{53}	—	September 14, 2007	Catalina	CSS	H	640 m	MPC · JPL
331119	2010 UJ_{62}	—	October 18, 2003	Kitt Peak	Spacewatch	·	800 m	MPC · JPL
331120	2010 UJ_{75}	—	November 12, 1996	Prescott	P. G. Comba	·	980 m	MPC · JPL
331121	2010 UB_{76}	—	August 29, 2005	Kitt Peak	Spacewatch	·	1.9 km	MPC · JPL
331122	2010 UJ_{82}	—	October 19, 2003	Kitt Peak	Spacewatch	·	840 m	MPC · JPL
331123	2010 UJ_{106}	—	December 13, 2001	Palomar	NEAT	GEF	1.4 km	MPC · JPL
331124	2010 VD_{13}	—	March 29, 2008	Kitt Peak	Spacewatch	ADE	2.5 km	MPC · JPL
331125	2010 VX_{30}	—	September 16, 2010	Mount Lemmon	Mount Lemmon Survey	·	1.7 km	MPC · JPL
331126	2010 VV_{36}	—	January 17, 2007	Catalina	CSS	·	1.7 km	MPC · JPL
331127	2010 VG_{46}	—	September 18, 2010	Mount Lemmon	Mount Lemmon Survey	·	1.9 km	MPC · JPL
331128	2010 VV_{47}	—	December 27, 2003	Kitt Peak	Spacewatch	·	1.0 km	MPC · JPL
331129	2010 VB_{48}	—	November 2, 2006	Mount Lemmon	Mount Lemmon Survey	(5)	1.2 km	MPC · JPL
331130	2010 VF_{55}	—	February 19, 2003	Palomar	NEAT	JUN	1.5 km	MPC · JPL
331131	2010 VB_{69}	—	December 1, 2005	Mount Lemmon	Mount Lemmon Survey	·	3.0 km	MPC · JPL
331132	2010 VJ_{82}	—	November 14, 2007	Mount Lemmon	Mount Lemmon Survey	MAS	890 m	MPC · JPL
331133	2010 VR_{85}	—	September 19, 2003	Palomar	NEAT	·	910 m	MPC · JPL
331134	2010 VQ_{91}	—	November 10, 2006	Kitt Peak	Spacewatch	·	960 m	MPC · JPL
331135	2010 VA_{104}	—	December 4, 2005	Mount Lemmon	Mount Lemmon Survey	KOR	1.3 km	MPC · JPL
331136	2010 VA_{113}	—	May 11, 1996	Kitt Peak	Spacewatch	·	840 m	MPC · JPL
331137	2010 VR_{119}	—	February 28, 2008	Mount Lemmon	Mount Lemmon Survey	·	970 m	MPC · JPL
331138	2010 VD_{133}	—	December 27, 2006	Catalina	CSS	JUN	1.3 km	MPC · JPL
331139	2010 VE_{160}	—	January 5, 2001	Socorro	LINEAR	H	890 m	MPC · JPL
331140	2010 VL_{165}	—	November 20, 2003	Socorro	LINEAR	·	880 m	MPC · JPL
331141	2010 VS_{165}	—	May 9, 2002	Palomar	NEAT	·	930 m	MPC · JPL
331142	2010 VH_{174}	—	July 26, 2005	Palomar	NEAT	·	2.7 km	MPC · JPL
331143	2010 VR_{187}	—	December 20, 2007	Kitt Peak	Spacewatch	·	490 m	MPC · JPL
331144	2010 VR_{193}	—	May 16, 2005	Mount Lemmon	Mount Lemmon Survey	·	1.4 km	MPC · JPL
331145	2010 VJ_{201}	—	September 9, 2007	Siding Spring	SSS	H	720 m	MPC · JPL
331146	2010 WJ_{36}	—	March 6, 2008	Mount Lemmon	Mount Lemmon Survey	·	1.1 km	MPC · JPL
331147	2010 WS_{45}	—	December 28, 2005	Mount Lemmon	Mount Lemmon Survey	·	2.3 km	MPC · JPL
331148	2010 WT_{55}	—	November 21, 2006	Mount Lemmon	Mount Lemmon Survey	EUN	1.5 km	MPC · JPL
331149	2010 WS_{57}	—	March 13, 2007	Mount Lemmon	Mount Lemmon Survey	·	2.2 km	MPC · JPL
331150	2010 WJ_{59}	—	September 11, 2005	Kitt Peak	Spacewatch	·	1.5 km	MPC · JPL
331151	2010 WO_{68}	—	November 30, 2010	Mount Lemmon	Mount Lemmon Survey	V	700 m	MPC · JPL
331152	2010 XC_{18}	—	March 15, 2007	Mount Lemmon	Mount Lemmon Survey	·	1.9 km	MPC · JPL
331153	2010 XU_{21}	—	October 21, 2006	Mount Lemmon	Mount Lemmon Survey	RAF	890 m	MPC · JPL
331154	2010 XL_{25}	—	April 26, 2003	Haleakala	NEAT	JUN	1.3 km	MPC · JPL
331155	2010 XL_{32}	—	September 16, 2004	Siding Spring	SSS	·	3.2 km	MPC · JPL
331156	2010 XL_{40}	—	January 27, 2003	Socorro	LINEAR	(5)	1.4 km	MPC · JPL
331157	2010 XA_{42}	—	October 31, 2010	Mount Lemmon	Mount Lemmon Survey	·	3.1 km	MPC · JPL
331158	2010 XT_{42}	—	September 28, 2006	Mount Lemmon	Mount Lemmon Survey	·	1.6 km	MPC · JPL
331159	2010 XL_{43}	—	October 4, 2006	Mount Lemmon	Mount Lemmon Survey	·	1.5 km	MPC · JPL
331160	2010 XL_{50}	—	September 19, 2006	Kitt Peak	Spacewatch	·	960 m	MPC · JPL
331161	2010 XG_{52}	—	April 29, 2008	Kitt Peak	Spacewatch	·	1.6 km	MPC · JPL
331162	2010 XB_{58}	—	December 14, 2006	Socorro	LINEAR	·	1.8 km	MPC · JPL
331163	2010 XR_{58}	—	December 8, 2002	Palomar	NEAT	·	1.4 km	MPC · JPL
331164	2010 XJ_{66}	—	October 5, 2003	Kitt Peak	Spacewatch	·	770 m	MPC · JPL
331165	2010 YQ_{3}	—	June 10, 2008	Kitt Peak	Spacewatch	TIR	3.5 km	MPC · JPL
331166	2010 YX_{4}	—	October 13, 2004	Anderson Mesa	LONEOS	·	3.6 km	MPC · JPL
331167	2011 AA_{3}	—	April 7, 2006	Anderson Mesa	LONEOS	EUP	4.2 km	MPC · JPL
331168	2011 AO_{13}	—	February 1, 2006	Catalina	CSS	·	3.5 km	MPC · JPL
331169	2011 AS_{13}	—	March 15, 2004	Kitt Peak	Spacewatch	SUL	2.3 km	MPC · JPL
331170	2011 AK_{16}	—	January 5, 2011	Catalina	CSS	·	3.5 km	MPC · JPL
331171	2011 AP_{18}	—	March 29, 2001	Haleakala	NEAT	·	3.4 km	MPC · JPL
331172	2011 AS_{19}	—	March 9, 2002	Kitt Peak	Spacewatch	·	1.7 km	MPC · JPL
331173	2011 AZ_{19}	—	March 23, 2006	Catalina	CSS	·	3.5 km	MPC · JPL
331174	2011 AE_{25}	—	January 22, 2002	Kitt Peak	Spacewatch	AEO	1.1 km	MPC · JPL
331175	2011 AL_{26}	—	October 22, 2006	Mount Lemmon	Mount Lemmon Survey	·	1.6 km	MPC · JPL
331176	2011 AU_{28}	—	August 31, 2005	Palomar	NEAT	·	1.7 km	MPC · JPL
331177	2011 AR_{31}	—	December 12, 2006	Kitt Peak	Spacewatch	·	1.6 km	MPC · JPL
331178	2011 AL_{33}	—	April 5, 2003	Anderson Mesa	LONEOS	·	2.4 km	MPC · JPL
331179	2011 AC_{35}	—	November 20, 2003	Socorro	LINEAR	·	850 m	MPC · JPL
331180	2011 AG_{35}	—	February 23, 2007	Catalina	CSS	EUN	1.5 km	MPC · JPL
331181	2011 AG_{40}	—	January 26, 2006	Mount Lemmon	Mount Lemmon Survey	·	3.0 km	MPC · JPL
331182	2011 AC_{45}	—	October 26, 2009	Mount Lemmon	Mount Lemmon Survey	·	2.1 km	MPC · JPL
331183	2011 AT_{45}	—	February 27, 2006	Mount Lemmon	Mount Lemmon Survey	·	2.7 km	MPC · JPL
331184	2011 AS_{46}	—	March 19, 2007	Mount Lemmon	Mount Lemmon Survey	·	2.6 km	MPC · JPL
331185	2011 AE_{48}	—	November 5, 2005	Kitt Peak	Spacewatch	·	2.2 km	MPC · JPL
331186	2011 AC_{53}	—	December 14, 2001	Socorro	LINEAR	·	2.1 km	MPC · JPL
331187	2011 AU_{56}	—	October 30, 2006	Mount Lemmon	Mount Lemmon Survey	BAR	1.3 km	MPC · JPL
331188	2011 AY_{58}	—	February 4, 2003	Kitt Peak	Spacewatch	·	1.3 km	MPC · JPL
331189	2011 AZ_{58}	—	November 18, 2009	Mount Lemmon	Mount Lemmon Survey	HYG	3.1 km	MPC · JPL
331190	2011 AC_{60}	—	November 15, 2006	Catalina	CSS	·	2.0 km	MPC · JPL
331191	2011 AZ_{60}	—	December 5, 2005	Mount Lemmon	Mount Lemmon Survey	·	2.1 km	MPC · JPL
331192	2011 AD_{61}	—	January 23, 2006	Kitt Peak	Spacewatch	·	2.2 km	MPC · JPL
331193	2011 AO_{61}	—	October 26, 2005	Kitt Peak	Spacewatch	WIT	1.1 km	MPC · JPL
331194	2011 AP_{62}	—	October 22, 2003	Apache Point	SDSS	·	3.6 km	MPC · JPL
331195	2011 AJ_{68}	—	January 26, 2006	Mount Lemmon	Mount Lemmon Survey	·	2.3 km	MPC · JPL
331196	2011 AX_{70}	—	September 19, 2006	Catalina	CSS	·	910 m	MPC · JPL
331197	2011 AP_{72}	—	February 8, 2007	Kitt Peak	Spacewatch	EUN	1.3 km	MPC · JPL
331198	2011 BY_{4}	—	January 13, 2002	Socorro	LINEAR	·	2.7 km	MPC · JPL
331199	2011 BO_{6}	—	March 10, 2007	Mount Lemmon	Mount Lemmon Survey	·	1.7 km	MPC · JPL
331200	2011 BN_{16}	—	April 10, 2003	Kitt Peak	Spacewatch	·	2.1 km	MPC · JPL

== 331201–331300 ==
back to top

Designation			Discovery			Properties		Ref
Permanent	Provisional	Named after	Date	Site	Discoverer(s)	Category	Diam.	Ref
331201	2011 BX_{19}	—	December 12, 2004	Kitt Peak	Spacewatch	·	2.8 km	MPC · JPL
331202	2011 BZ_{20}	—	November 4, 2005	Kitt Peak	Spacewatch	·	1.6 km	MPC · JPL
331203	2011 BG_{22}	—	October 26, 2009	Mount Lemmon	Mount Lemmon Survey	·	3.3 km	MPC · JPL
331204	2011 BT_{28}	—	April 25, 2007	Kitt Peak	Spacewatch	·	3.7 km	MPC · JPL
331205	2011 BR_{31}	—	August 8, 2004	Palomar	NEAT	·	1.7 km	MPC · JPL
331206	2011 BU_{33}	—	September 17, 2009	Mount Lemmon	Mount Lemmon Survey	AGN	1.3 km	MPC · JPL
331207	2011 BM_{34}	—	February 17, 2007	Kitt Peak	Spacewatch	·	1.6 km	MPC · JPL
331208	2011 BW_{34}	—	March 14, 2007	Mount Lemmon	Mount Lemmon Survey	WIT	1.3 km	MPC · JPL
331209	2011 BC_{35}	—	October 22, 2009	Mount Lemmon	Mount Lemmon Survey	·	2.9 km	MPC · JPL
331210	2011 BQ_{36}	—	October 24, 2005	Mauna Kea	A. Boattini	EMA	3.0 km	MPC · JPL
331211	2011 BX_{36}	—	April 23, 2006	Anderson Mesa	LONEOS	·	5.9 km	MPC · JPL
331212	2011 BK_{37}	—	March 5, 2000	Socorro	LINEAR	·	3.3 km	MPC · JPL
331213	2011 BY_{37}	—	March 11, 2005	Mount Lemmon	Mount Lemmon Survey	·	4.7 km	MPC · JPL
331214	2011 BC_{39}	—	March 3, 2000	Kitt Peak	Spacewatch	·	3.5 km	MPC · JPL
331215	2011 BA_{40}	—	October 12, 2009	Mount Lemmon	Mount Lemmon Survey	EOS	2.4 km	MPC · JPL
331216	2011 BU_{45}	—	March 24, 2006	Kitt Peak	Spacewatch	·	4.7 km	MPC · JPL
331217	2011 BK_{47}	—	October 28, 2005	Kitt Peak	Spacewatch	·	1.3 km	MPC · JPL
331218	2011 BM_{48}	—	November 4, 2004	Kitt Peak	Spacewatch	·	2.0 km	MPC · JPL
331219	2011 BP_{50}	—	March 12, 2008	Kitt Peak	Spacewatch	·	760 m	MPC · JPL
331220	2011 BN_{60}	—	October 24, 2009	Catalina	CSS	·	3.8 km	MPC · JPL
331221	2011 BT_{61}	—	June 23, 2005	Palomar	NEAT	·	1.7 km	MPC · JPL
331222	2011 BW_{63}	—	January 19, 2002	Kitt Peak	Spacewatch	·	2.3 km	MPC · JPL
331223	2011 BH_{68}	—	September 22, 2009	Mount Lemmon	Mount Lemmon Survey	·	2.8 km	MPC · JPL
331224	2011 BJ_{68}	—	April 22, 2007	Mount Lemmon	Mount Lemmon Survey	KOR	1.4 km	MPC · JPL
331225	2011 BD_{74}	—	January 7, 2006	Kitt Peak	Spacewatch	AGN	1.2 km	MPC · JPL
331226	2011 BJ_{74}	—	September 26, 1995	Kitt Peak	Spacewatch	·	2.1 km	MPC · JPL
331227	2011 BQ_{78}	—	November 17, 2006	Mount Lemmon	Mount Lemmon Survey	V	930 m	MPC · JPL
331228	2011 BS_{78}	—	February 20, 2002	Kitt Peak	Spacewatch	·	2.0 km	MPC · JPL
331229	2011 BX_{79}	—	November 4, 2005	Mount Lemmon	Mount Lemmon Survey	·	2.1 km	MPC · JPL
331230	2011 BR_{81}	—	January 24, 2007	Catalina	CSS	·	2.6 km	MPC · JPL
331231	2011 BO_{82}	—	December 4, 2005	Kitt Peak	Spacewatch	·	2.4 km	MPC · JPL
331232	2011 BT_{83}	—	February 26, 2007	Mount Lemmon	Mount Lemmon Survey	·	2.2 km	MPC · JPL
331233	2011 BM_{85}	—	November 17, 2009	Catalina	CSS	·	3.8 km	MPC · JPL
331234	2011 BO_{85}	—	October 1, 2009	Mount Lemmon	Mount Lemmon Survey	·	3.5 km	MPC · JPL
331235	2011 BE_{88}	—	October 27, 2005	Mount Lemmon	Mount Lemmon Survey	KOR	1.6 km	MPC · JPL
331236	2011 BK_{90}	—	December 5, 2010	Mount Lemmon	Mount Lemmon Survey	ADE	2.3 km	MPC · JPL
331237	2011 BR_{95}	—	November 25, 2005	Kitt Peak	Spacewatch	·	2.0 km	MPC · JPL
331238	2011 BH_{98}	—	November 25, 2005	Kitt Peak	Spacewatch	·	3.8 km	MPC · JPL
331239	2011 BK_{98}	—	October 26, 2009	Kitt Peak	Spacewatch	·	3.4 km	MPC · JPL
331240	2011 BU_{102}	—	January 27, 2007	Kitt Peak	Spacewatch	·	1.3 km	MPC · JPL
331241	2011 BD_{103}	—	March 16, 2007	Mount Lemmon	Mount Lemmon Survey	WIT	1.2 km	MPC · JPL
331242	2011 BN_{116}	—	June 17, 2005	Mount Lemmon	Mount Lemmon Survey	·	1.6 km	MPC · JPL
331243	2011 BA_{119}	—	October 31, 2002	Socorro	LINEAR	·	1.6 km	MPC · JPL
331244	2011 BM_{121}	—	November 4, 2005	Mount Lemmon	Mount Lemmon Survey	·	1.6 km	MPC · JPL
331245	2011 BV_{122}	—	January 8, 1994	Kitt Peak	Spacewatch	·	1.7 km	MPC · JPL
331246	2011 BF_{132}	—	March 12, 2002	Kitt Peak	Spacewatch	·	2.3 km	MPC · JPL
331247	2011 BN_{149}	—	March 14, 2007	Kitt Peak	Spacewatch	·	1.8 km	MPC · JPL
331248	2011 CW	—	April 11, 2008	Mount Lemmon	Mount Lemmon Survey	·	1.5 km	MPC · JPL
331249	2011 CX_{1}	—	September 3, 2008	Kitt Peak	Spacewatch	·	4.9 km	MPC · JPL
331250	2011 CA_{2}	—	September 19, 2003	Kitt Peak	Spacewatch	·	3.5 km	MPC · JPL
331251	2011 CB_{2}	—	February 3, 2000	Socorro	LINEAR	·	5.1 km	MPC · JPL
331252	2011 CE_{2}	—	January 9, 2002	Socorro	LINEAR	·	2.4 km	MPC · JPL
331253	2011 CH_{4}	—	October 18, 2009	Catalina	CSS	·	4.2 km	MPC · JPL
331254	2011 CF_{17}	—	October 25, 2009	Mount Lemmon	Mount Lemmon Survey	·	3.3 km	MPC · JPL
331255	2011 CX_{21}	—	November 20, 2001	Socorro	LINEAR	(5)	1.5 km	MPC · JPL
331256	2011 CN_{27}	—	December 5, 2005	Kitt Peak	Spacewatch	HOF	3.8 km	MPC · JPL
331257	2011 CR_{35}	—	October 25, 2005	Kitt Peak	Spacewatch	·	1.7 km	MPC · JPL
331258	2011 CL_{39}	—	December 6, 2005	Socorro	LINEAR	·	3.4 km	MPC · JPL
331259	2011 CB_{40}	—	January 27, 2000	Kitt Peak	Spacewatch	·	2.8 km	MPC · JPL
331260	2011 CL_{42}	—	March 20, 2007	Kitt Peak	Spacewatch	·	2.5 km	MPC · JPL
331261	2011 CA_{43}	—	October 24, 2009	Mount Lemmon	Mount Lemmon Survey	EOS	2.2 km	MPC · JPL
331262	2011 CC_{45}	—	August 5, 2002	Palomar	NEAT	·	4.1 km	MPC · JPL
331263	2011 CK_{47}	—	November 30, 2005	Kitt Peak	Spacewatch	NEM	2.2 km	MPC · JPL
331264	2011 CK_{57}	—	February 24, 2006	Kitt Peak	Spacewatch	·	2.2 km	MPC · JPL
331265	2011 CS_{60}	—	September 7, 2004	Kitt Peak	Spacewatch	·	1.7 km	MPC · JPL
331266	2011 CH_{61}	—	March 10, 2003	Kitt Peak	Spacewatch	·	1.3 km	MPC · JPL
331267	2011 CD_{70}	—	March 23, 2001	Haleakala	NEAT	·	3.8 km	MPC · JPL
331268	2011 CN_{70}	—	January 16, 2000	Kitt Peak	Spacewatch	EOS	2.2 km	MPC · JPL
331269	2011 CZ_{70}	—	March 9, 2006	Kitt Peak	Spacewatch	EOS	3.2 km	MPC · JPL
331270	2011 CW_{71}	—	December 4, 2005	Kitt Peak	Spacewatch	·	1.9 km	MPC · JPL
331271	2011 CD_{75}	—	September 28, 2009	Mount Lemmon	Mount Lemmon Survey	·	2.9 km	MPC · JPL
331272	2011 CB_{78}	—	September 21, 2003	Kitt Peak	Spacewatch	·	2.8 km	MPC · JPL
331273	2011 CM_{83}	—	March 16, 2007	Mount Lemmon	Mount Lemmon Survey	·	1.6 km	MPC · JPL
331274	2011 CG_{88}	—	August 26, 2003	Cerro Tololo	Deep Ecliptic Survey	·	2.5 km	MPC · JPL
331275	2011 CT_{88}	—	September 4, 2008	Kitt Peak	Spacewatch	T_{j} (2.98) · 3:2	4.6 km	MPC · JPL
331276	2011 CO_{90}	—	January 15, 2005	Kitt Peak	Spacewatch	HYG	3.4 km	MPC · JPL
331277	2011 CV_{90}	—	February 24, 2006	Kitt Peak	Spacewatch	LIX	3.7 km	MPC · JPL
331278	2011 CY_{93}	—	September 6, 2008	Catalina	CSS	DOR	2.4 km	MPC · JPL
331279	2011 DO_{4}	—	June 7, 2002	Palomar	NEAT	·	2.7 km	MPC · JPL
331280	2011 DV_{15}	—	February 22, 2003	Kitt Peak	Spacewatch	T_{j} (2.98) · 3:2	5.3 km	MPC · JPL
331281	2011 DS_{19}	—	March 12, 2000	Socorro	LINEAR	TIR	3.4 km	MPC · JPL
331282	2011 DE_{25}	—	August 6, 2004	Palomar	NEAT	·	1.8 km	MPC · JPL
331283	2011 DQ_{25}	—	February 2, 2000	Kitt Peak	Spacewatch	·	4.5 km	MPC · JPL
331284	2011 DH_{26}	—	February 1, 1995	Kitt Peak	Spacewatch	·	2.9 km	MPC · JPL
331285	2011 DN_{27}	—	January 8, 2006	Mount Lemmon	Mount Lemmon Survey	·	2.3 km	MPC · JPL
331286	2011 DJ_{29}	—	January 30, 2006	Kitt Peak	Spacewatch	TEL	1.1 km	MPC · JPL
331287	2011 DC_{30}	—	December 3, 2005	Mauna Kea	A. Boattini	·	2.5 km	MPC · JPL
331288	2011 DJ_{40}	—	September 13, 2002	Palomar	NEAT	·	3.4 km	MPC · JPL
331289	2011 DJ_{43}	—	September 26, 2003	Socorro	LINEAR	·	2.5 km	MPC · JPL
331290	2011 DE_{49}	—	October 26, 1995	Kitt Peak	Spacewatch	·	2.7 km	MPC · JPL
331291	2011 EN_{1}	—	September 21, 2004	Kitt Peak	Spacewatch	PAD	1.9 km	MPC · JPL
331292	2011 ED_{6}	—	December 1, 2005	Kitt Peak	Spacewatch	·	1.9 km	MPC · JPL
331293	2011 EN_{6}	—	June 2, 1998	Kitt Peak	Spacewatch	·	900 m	MPC · JPL
331294	2011 EH_{7}	—	February 11, 2010	WISE	WISE	·	3.7 km	MPC · JPL
331295	2011 EN_{8}	—	August 18, 2009	Kitt Peak	Spacewatch	(21344)	1.9 km	MPC · JPL
331296	2011 ET_{14}	—	October 23, 2006	Kitt Peak	Spacewatch	·	730 m	MPC · JPL
331297	2011 EM_{19}	—	December 26, 2009	Kitt Peak	Spacewatch	·	4.0 km	MPC · JPL
331298 Eunicefoote	2011 EN_{19}	Eunicefoote	July 30, 2008	Mount Lemmon	Mount Lemmon Survey	EOS	2.4 km	MPC · JPL
331299	2011 EM_{20}	—	May 11, 2007	Mount Lemmon	Mount Lemmon Survey	·	3.4 km	MPC · JPL
331300	2011 EN_{20}	—	December 23, 2001	Kitt Peak	Spacewatch	·	1.9 km	MPC · JPL

== 331301–331400 ==
back to top

Designation			Discovery			Properties		Ref
Permanent	Provisional	Named after	Date	Site	Discoverer(s)	Category	Diam.	Ref
331301	2011 EW_{26}	—	January 31, 2006	Kitt Peak	Spacewatch	AGN	1.7 km	MPC · JPL
331302	2011 EX_{35}	—	April 13, 2004	Kitt Peak	Spacewatch	·	1.1 km	MPC · JPL
331303	2011 EP_{42}	—	October 8, 2002	Haleakala	NEAT	EUP	4.9 km	MPC · JPL
331304	2011 EA_{50}	—	April 21, 1996	Kitt Peak	Spacewatch	·	2.7 km	MPC · JPL
331305	2011 ES_{50}	—	October 29, 2003	Kitt Peak	Spacewatch	EOS	2.8 km	MPC · JPL
331306	2011 EQ_{58}	—	January 17, 2005	Kitt Peak	Spacewatch	EOS	2.5 km	MPC · JPL
331307	2011 EN_{59}	—	May 22, 2006	Kitt Peak	Spacewatch	·	3.8 km	MPC · JPL
331308	2011 EM_{64}	—	November 16, 2009	La Sagra	OAM	HYG	2.8 km	MPC · JPL
331309	2011 EB_{76}	—	January 7, 2005	Catalina	CSS	·	3.9 km	MPC · JPL
331310	2011 FB_{1}	—	August 28, 2005	Kitt Peak	Spacewatch	V	720 m	MPC · JPL
331311	2011 FP_{37}	—	April 7, 2000	Socorro	LINEAR	TIR	4.2 km	MPC · JPL
331312	2011 FK_{86}	—	July 27, 2005	Palomar	NEAT	·	940 m	MPC · JPL
331313	2011 FJ_{105}	—	October 20, 2003	Palomar	NEAT	EOS	2.3 km	MPC · JPL
331314	2011 FF_{151}	—	September 20, 2007	Kitt Peak	Spacewatch	·	4.0 km	MPC · JPL
331315	2011 GC_{32}	—	January 13, 2005	Catalina	CSS	·	4.9 km	MPC · JPL
331316 Cavedon	2011 GP_{36}	Cavedon	April 20, 2006	Vallemare Borbona	V. S. Casulli	·	3.9 km	MPC · JPL
331317	2011 GA_{40}	—	January 28, 1995	Kitt Peak	Spacewatch	·	3.4 km	MPC · JPL
331318	2011 QB_{58}	—	September 13, 2002	Palomar	NEAT	·	2.5 km	MPC · JPL
331319	2011 SD_{190}	—	May 7, 2006	Mount Lemmon	Mount Lemmon Survey	·	1.4 km	MPC · JPL
331320	2011 UE_{87}	—	September 9, 2007	Kitt Peak	Spacewatch	·	2.0 km	MPC · JPL
331321	2011 UN_{311}	—	September 24, 2006	Kitt Peak	Spacewatch	KOR	1.4 km	MPC · JPL
331322	2011 WW_{115}	—	November 30, 2006	Kitt Peak	Spacewatch	·	2.1 km	MPC · JPL
331323	2011 WE_{118}	—	April 22, 2004	Kitt Peak	Spacewatch	·	2.9 km	MPC · JPL
331324	2011 YE_{23}	—	February 28, 2000	Socorro	LINEAR	·	1.2 km	MPC · JPL
331325	2011 YK_{30}	—	February 25, 2007	Mount Lemmon	Mount Lemmon Survey	·	3.2 km	MPC · JPL
331326	2011 YA_{35}	—	February 10, 2003	Kitt Peak	Spacewatch	·	1.7 km	MPC · JPL
331327	2011 YZ_{44}	—	January 31, 1998	Kitt Peak	Spacewatch	·	820 m	MPC · JPL
331328	2011 YT_{59}	—	January 15, 2004	Kitt Peak	Spacewatch	·	950 m	MPC · JPL
331329	2012 BU_{10}	—	April 11, 2002	Palomar	NEAT	·	3.4 km	MPC · JPL
331330	2012 BH_{15}	—	June 29, 1997	Kitt Peak	Spacewatch	·	5.5 km	MPC · JPL
331331	2012 BC_{17}	—	October 5, 2002	Palomar	NEAT	·	2.0 km	MPC · JPL
331332	2012 BD_{20}	—	October 29, 2005	Catalina	CSS	·	3.5 km	MPC · JPL
331333	2012 BS_{22}	—	January 21, 2001	Socorro	LINEAR	·	4.1 km	MPC · JPL
331334	2012 BA_{23}	—	March 18, 2001	Haleakala	NEAT	NYS	1.5 km	MPC · JPL
331335	2012 BC_{34}	—	September 26, 1998	Xinglong	SCAP	·	2.0 km	MPC · JPL
331336	2012 BL_{47}	—	June 29, 2005	Kitt Peak	Spacewatch	·	1.7 km	MPC · JPL
331337	2012 BY_{52}	—	January 17, 2005	Catalina	CSS	·	900 m	MPC · JPL
331338	2012 BT_{53}	—	August 28, 2006	Kitt Peak	Spacewatch	·	1.1 km	MPC · JPL
331339	2012 BG_{75}	—	October 6, 1996	Kitt Peak	Spacewatch	V	750 m	MPC · JPL
331340	2012 BW_{75}	—	November 5, 1999	Kitt Peak	Spacewatch	MAS	900 m	MPC · JPL
331341 Frankscholten	2012 BL_{102}	Frankscholten	February 6, 2007	Mount Lemmon	Mount Lemmon Survey	·	2.1 km	MPC · JPL
331342	2012 BJ_{112}	—	September 28, 2006	Catalina	CSS	·	2.2 km	MPC · JPL
331343	2012 BB_{113}	—	September 26, 2005	Kitt Peak	Spacewatch	·	2.0 km	MPC · JPL
331344	2012 BC_{113}	—	September 30, 2005	Kitt Peak	Spacewatch	·	1.7 km	MPC · JPL
331345	2012 BX_{119}	—	January 19, 2002	Kitt Peak	Spacewatch	·	2.6 km	MPC · JPL
331346	2012 BT_{126}	—	March 4, 2005	Kitt Peak	Spacewatch	·	900 m	MPC · JPL
331347	2012 CR_{5}	—	September 7, 2004	Socorro	LINEAR	·	2.7 km	MPC · JPL
331348	2012 CO_{12}	—	March 11, 2005	Mount Lemmon	Mount Lemmon Survey	MAS	720 m	MPC · JPL
331349	2012 CP_{14}	—	November 20, 2001	Socorro	LINEAR	AST	2.1 km	MPC · JPL
331350	2012 CE_{15}	—	March 3, 2005	Catalina	CSS	·	1.3 km	MPC · JPL
331351	2012 CV_{33}	—	April 4, 2005	Mount Lemmon	Mount Lemmon Survey	V	740 m	MPC · JPL
331352	2012 CW_{33}	—	March 16, 2007	Kitt Peak	Spacewatch	·	3.0 km	MPC · JPL
331353	2012 CN_{40}	—	October 10, 1999	Kitt Peak	Spacewatch	MAS	730 m	MPC · JPL
331354	2012 CE_{46}	—	December 2, 2004	Catalina	CSS	·	4.3 km	MPC · JPL
331355	2012 CL_{47}	—	October 9, 2004	Kitt Peak	Spacewatch	EOS	2.1 km	MPC · JPL
331356	2012 CO_{52}	—	August 31, 2005	Palomar	NEAT	·	3.0 km	MPC · JPL
331357	2012 CV_{52}	—	January 16, 2005	Kitt Peak	Spacewatch	·	930 m	MPC · JPL
331358	2012 CZ_{53}	—	December 23, 2003	Socorro	LINEAR	·	1.3 km	MPC · JPL
331359	2012 DC_{6}	—	January 27, 2006	Catalina	CSS	·	4.5 km	MPC · JPL
331360	2012 DA_{15}	—	January 16, 1996	Kitt Peak	Spacewatch	·	980 m	MPC · JPL
331361	2012 DY_{17}	—	March 11, 2005	Anderson Mesa	LONEOS	PHO	3.4 km	MPC · JPL
331362	2012 DF_{24}	—	October 17, 2003	Kitt Peak	Spacewatch	·	770 m	MPC · JPL
331363	2012 DE_{26}	—	December 25, 2005	Mount Lemmon	Mount Lemmon Survey	·	2.1 km	MPC · JPL
331364	2012 DK_{27}	—	August 20, 2003	Palomar	NEAT	·	3.4 km	MPC · JPL
331365	2012 DM_{34}	—	September 19, 2006	Catalina	CSS	·	1.5 km	MPC · JPL
331366	2012 DN_{34}	—	November 20, 2006	Kitt Peak	Spacewatch	NYS	1.3 km	MPC · JPL
331367	2012 DG_{38}	—	January 19, 2001	Kitt Peak	Spacewatch	·	3.8 km	MPC · JPL
331368	2012 DJ_{44}	—	October 19, 2003	Kitt Peak	Spacewatch	·	3.6 km	MPC · JPL
331369	2012 DJ_{48}	—	March 14, 2007	Mount Lemmon	Mount Lemmon Survey	·	2.7 km	MPC · JPL
331370	2012 DX_{49}	—	September 1, 2005	Kitt Peak	Spacewatch	·	1.7 km	MPC · JPL
331371 Jockers	2012 DR_{53}	Jockers	June 13, 2008	Kitt Peak	Spacewatch	EOS	2.3 km	MPC · JPL
331372	2012 DZ_{57}	—	October 2, 2003	Kitt Peak	Spacewatch	HYG	2.5 km	MPC · JPL
331373	2012 DY_{58}	—	January 31, 2006	Kitt Peak	Spacewatch	THM	2.6 km	MPC · JPL
331374	2012 DG_{72}	—	July 17, 2002	Palomar	NEAT	V	830 m	MPC · JPL
331375	2012 DC_{74}	—	March 10, 2003	Kitt Peak	Spacewatch	·	2.0 km	MPC · JPL
331376	2012 DT_{79}	—	December 2, 2005	Catalina	CSS	·	3.3 km	MPC · JPL
331377	2012 DO_{83}	—	April 4, 2005	Mount Lemmon	Mount Lemmon Survey	·	970 m	MPC · JPL
331378	2012 DC_{87}	—	April 4, 2002	Palomar	NEAT	·	900 m	MPC · JPL
331379	2012 DX_{87}	—	August 3, 2000	Kitt Peak	Spacewatch	·	1.8 km	MPC · JPL
331380	2012 DS_{88}	—	March 13, 2005	Mount Lemmon	Mount Lemmon Survey	·	650 m	MPC · JPL
331381	2012 EE_{2}	—	September 26, 2006	Kitt Peak	Spacewatch	NYS	1.3 km	MPC · JPL
331382	2012 ES_{2}	—	November 1, 2006	Mount Lemmon	Mount Lemmon Survey	·	1.6 km	MPC · JPL
331383	2012 EE_{9}	—	August 28, 2005	Kitt Peak	Spacewatch	·	1.9 km	MPC · JPL
331384	2012 EK_{12}	—	March 7, 2003	Anderson Mesa	LONEOS	·	2.1 km	MPC · JPL
331385	2012 ES_{12}	—	October 22, 1995	Kitt Peak	Spacewatch	·	1.2 km	MPC · JPL
331386	2012 EU_{12}	—	March 17, 2005	Kitt Peak	Spacewatch	·	1.2 km	MPC · JPL
331387	2012 FV_{3}	—	March 6, 2003	Anderson Mesa	LONEOS	·	2.5 km	MPC · JPL
331388	2012 FD_{11}	—	September 14, 2005	Kitt Peak	Spacewatch	·	1.8 km	MPC · JPL
331389	2012 FJ_{13}	—	September 26, 2005	Kitt Peak	Spacewatch	·	1.9 km	MPC · JPL
331390	2012 FC_{14}	—	September 28, 2006	Mount Lemmon	Mount Lemmon Survey	·	820 m	MPC · JPL
331391	2012 FM_{15}	—	October 23, 2003	Apache Point	SDSS	·	940 m	MPC · JPL
331392	2012 FV_{18}	—	October 11, 2004	Kitt Peak	Spacewatch	·	2.7 km	MPC · JPL
331393	2012 FJ_{19}	—	March 19, 2009	Mount Lemmon	Mount Lemmon Survey	·	700 m	MPC · JPL
331394	2012 FH_{22}	—	January 4, 2003	Kitt Peak	Spacewatch	·	1.6 km	MPC · JPL
331395	2012 FR_{26}	—	November 13, 2007	Kitt Peak	Spacewatch	·	670 m	MPC · JPL
331396	2012 FS_{28}	—	September 27, 2000	Kitt Peak	Spacewatch	·	2.4 km	MPC · JPL
331397	2012 FP_{31}	—	January 7, 2006	Anderson Mesa	LONEOS	·	4.1 km	MPC · JPL
331398	2012 FH_{32}	—	March 10, 2003	Palomar	NEAT	·	3.3 km	MPC · JPL
331399	2012 FJ_{32}	—	November 4, 2004	Catalina	CSS	EOS	2.3 km	MPC · JPL
331400	2012 FH_{34}	—	December 30, 2005	Kitt Peak	Spacewatch	·	2.3 km	MPC · JPL

== 331401–331500 ==
back to top

Designation			Discovery			Properties		Ref
Permanent	Provisional	Named after	Date	Site	Discoverer(s)	Category	Diam.	Ref
331401	2012 FU_{39}	—	November 19, 2003	Catalina	CSS	·	1.6 km	MPC · JPL
331402	2012 FY_{39}	—	April 10, 2005	Siding Spring	SSS	·	1.3 km	MPC · JPL
331403	2012 FH_{41}	—	March 2, 1995	Kitt Peak	Spacewatch	·	1.4 km	MPC · JPL
331404	2012 FD_{43}	—	January 14, 2007	Mount Nyukasa	Japan Aerospace Exploration Agency	ADE	2.8 km	MPC · JPL
331405	2012 FJ_{43}	—	September 29, 2005	Mount Lemmon	Mount Lemmon Survey	(29841)	1.8 km	MPC · JPL
331406	2012 FX_{43}	—	November 3, 1996	Kitt Peak	Spacewatch	slow	3.5 km	MPC · JPL
331407	2012 FW_{44}	—	November 17, 2006	Kitt Peak	Spacewatch	·	1.7 km	MPC · JPL
331408	2012 FX_{44}	—	September 7, 1999	Socorro	LINEAR	H	750 m	MPC · JPL
331409	2012 FQ_{47}	—	June 30, 2004	Siding Spring	SSS	·	2.3 km	MPC · JPL
331410	2012 FM_{49}	—	January 30, 2006	Kitt Peak	Spacewatch	VER	3.9 km	MPC · JPL
331411	2012 FN_{56}	—	March 3, 2005	Kitt Peak	Spacewatch	·	850 m	MPC · JPL
331412	2012 FD_{57}	—	February 18, 2008	Mount Lemmon	Mount Lemmon Survey	·	1.9 km	MPC · JPL
331413	2012 FN_{59}	—	January 31, 1998	Caussols	ODAS	·	840 m	MPC · JPL
331414	2012 FV_{59}	—	March 4, 2001	Kitt Peak	Spacewatch	·	3.2 km	MPC · JPL
331415	2012 FE_{62}	—	October 8, 2004	Kitt Peak	Spacewatch	EOS	2.6 km	MPC · JPL
331416	2012 FW_{64}	—	January 11, 2008	Kitt Peak	Spacewatch	NYS	1.1 km	MPC · JPL
331417	2012 FG_{67}	—	January 14, 2002	Kitt Peak	Spacewatch	·	2.2 km	MPC · JPL
331418	2012 FD_{68}	—	August 30, 2002	Palomar	NEAT	·	3.6 km	MPC · JPL
331419	2012 FO_{69}	—	December 18, 1995	Kitt Peak	Spacewatch	·	1.9 km	MPC · JPL
331420	2012 FQ_{72}	—	April 14, 2008	Catalina	CSS	·	1.7 km	MPC · JPL
331421	2012 FW_{72}	—	March 27, 2003	Anderson Mesa	LONEOS	·	2.4 km	MPC · JPL
331422	2012 FF_{73}	—	March 19, 1999	Kitt Peak	Spacewatch	·	1.6 km	MPC · JPL
331423	2012 FZ_{76}	—	November 2, 2007	Kitt Peak	Spacewatch	·	780 m	MPC · JPL
331424	2012 FK_{78}	—	October 2, 2005	Mount Lemmon	Mount Lemmon Survey	·	2.8 km	MPC · JPL
331425	2012 GC_{1}	—	December 8, 2004	Socorro	LINEAR	·	6.5 km	MPC · JPL
331426	2012 GE_{1}	—	April 28, 2003	Anderson Mesa	LONEOS	·	2.4 km	MPC · JPL
331427	2012 GL_{2}	—	March 6, 2008	Mount Lemmon	Mount Lemmon Survey	·	1.3 km	MPC · JPL
331428	2012 GL_{5}	—	March 10, 1999	Kitt Peak	Spacewatch	·	1.7 km	MPC · JPL
331429	2012 GO_{12}	—	March 20, 1999	Socorro	LINEAR	JUN	1.3 km	MPC · JPL
331430	2012 GP_{12}	—	September 25, 1995	Kitt Peak	Spacewatch	·	830 m	MPC · JPL
331431	2012 GU_{12}	—	April 9, 2003	Kitt Peak	Spacewatch	·	3.4 km	MPC · JPL
331432	2012 GW_{13}	—	October 25, 2003	Anderson Mesa	LONEOS	·	3.5 km	MPC · JPL
331433	2012 GK_{15}	—	February 23, 2007	Kitt Peak	Spacewatch	·	2.9 km	MPC · JPL
331434	2012 GJ_{16}	—	January 26, 2007	Kitt Peak	Spacewatch	·	1.9 km	MPC · JPL
331435	2012 GC_{17}	—	June 1, 2005	Kitt Peak	Spacewatch	·	1.6 km	MPC · JPL
331436	2012 GO_{17}	—	August 11, 2002	Palomar	NEAT	·	4.7 km	MPC · JPL
331437	2012 GR_{20}	—	April 13, 2008	Mount Lemmon	Mount Lemmon Survey	·	1.8 km	MPC · JPL
331438	2012 GA_{21}	—	October 18, 2003	Kitt Peak	Spacewatch	·	750 m	MPC · JPL
331439	2012 GC_{21}	—	February 1, 2000	Kitt Peak	Spacewatch	·	3.3 km	MPC · JPL
331440	2012 GT_{22}	—	January 7, 2006	Mount Lemmon	Mount Lemmon Survey	EOS	2.3 km	MPC · JPL
331441	2012 GX_{22}	—	August 21, 2008	Kitt Peak	Spacewatch	·	2.4 km	MPC · JPL
331442	2012 GZ_{22}	—	June 25, 1995	Kitt Peak	Spacewatch	·	3.7 km	MPC · JPL
331443	2012 HU_{1}	—	June 9, 2007	Catalina	CSS	·	4.2 km	MPC · JPL
331444	2012 HO_{3}	—	February 25, 2006	Kitt Peak	Spacewatch	·	2.7 km	MPC · JPL
331445	2012 HD_{6}	—	May 11, 2007	Mount Lemmon	Mount Lemmon Survey	·	5.3 km	MPC · JPL
331446	2012 HN_{6}	—	September 10, 2004	Kitt Peak	Spacewatch	·	2.4 km	MPC · JPL
331447	2012 HG_{7}	—	September 30, 1991	Kitt Peak	Spacewatch	·	1.4 km	MPC · JPL
331448	2012 HX_{7}	—	October 29, 2003	Kitt Peak	Spacewatch	EUP	5.8 km	MPC · JPL
331449	2012 HM_{9}	—	January 23, 2006	Kitt Peak	Spacewatch	EOS	2.3 km	MPC · JPL
331450	2012 HC_{16}	—	March 1, 1992	La Silla	UESAC	·	3.2 km	MPC · JPL
331451	2012 HM_{16}	—	August 10, 1996	Haleakala	NEAT	·	4.9 km	MPC · JPL
331452	2012 HF_{18}	—	May 24, 2001	Apache Point	SDSS	·	3.2 km	MPC · JPL
331453	2012 HF_{20}	—	August 20, 2002	Palomar	NEAT	·	5.0 km	MPC · JPL
331454	2012 HF_{23}	—	October 21, 2003	Palomar	NEAT	·	3.7 km	MPC · JPL
331455	2012 HJ_{23}	—	January 23, 2006	Kitt Peak	Spacewatch	EOS	2.5 km	MPC · JPL
331456	2012 HK_{24}	—	September 8, 1999	Catalina	CSS	GEF	1.7 km	MPC · JPL
331457	2012 HN_{26}	—	February 23, 2007	Kitt Peak	Spacewatch	·	1.6 km	MPC · JPL
331458	2012 HW_{26}	—	October 8, 2004	Kitt Peak	Spacewatch	·	1.7 km	MPC · JPL
331459	2012 HW_{27}	—	September 17, 2003	Kitt Peak	Spacewatch	EOS	2.5 km	MPC · JPL
331460	2012 HA_{28}	—	September 24, 2009	Mount Lemmon	Mount Lemmon Survey	·	2.2 km	MPC · JPL
331461	2012 HZ_{29}	—	September 29, 2003	Kitt Peak	Spacewatch	·	3.1 km	MPC · JPL
331462	2012 HA_{30}	—	February 10, 1999	Kitt Peak	Spacewatch	·	1.4 km	MPC · JPL
331463	2012 HF_{30}	—	April 19, 2007	Mount Lemmon	Mount Lemmon Survey	EOS	2.1 km	MPC · JPL
331464	2012 HB_{32}	—	October 19, 2003	Kitt Peak	Spacewatch	·	830 m	MPC · JPL
331465	2012 HG_{34}	—	May 11, 2007	Mount Lemmon	Mount Lemmon Survey	·	3.0 km	MPC · JPL
331466	2012 HR_{34}	—	May 19, 2004	Campo Imperatore	CINEOS	·	1.5 km	MPC · JPL
331467	2012 HY_{36}	—	October 16, 2006	Catalina	CSS	·	970 m	MPC · JPL
331468	2012 JB	—	September 19, 2009	Mount Lemmon	Mount Lemmon Survey	·	4.1 km	MPC · JPL
331469	6006 P-L	—	September 24, 1960	Palomar	C. J. van Houten, I. van Houten-Groeneveld, T. Gehrels	·	870 m	MPC · JPL
331470	3171 T-3	—	October 16, 1977	Palomar	C. J. van Houten, I. van Houten-Groeneveld, T. Gehrels	·	900 m	MPC · JPL
331471	1984 QY_{1}	—	August 27, 1984	Palomar	E. F. Helin, Rose, P.	T_{j} (2.68) · APO +1km	2.8 km	MPC · JPL
331472	1993 BB_{9}	—	January 21, 1993	Kitt Peak	Spacewatch	·	2.8 km	MPC · JPL
331473	1993 TP_{5}	—	October 9, 1993	Kitt Peak	Spacewatch	(13314)	2.1 km	MPC · JPL
331474	1994 PO_{14}	—	August 10, 1994	La Silla	E. W. Elst	·	1.8 km	MPC · JPL
331475	1995 SZ_{13}	—	September 18, 1995	Kitt Peak	Spacewatch	·	770 m	MPC · JPL
331476	1995 US_{17}	—	October 18, 1995	Kitt Peak	Spacewatch	·	1.9 km	MPC · JPL
331477	1996 TO_{24}	—	October 6, 1996	Kitt Peak	Spacewatch	EUN	1.7 km	MPC · JPL
331478	1997 TR_{19}	—	October 2, 1997	Kitt Peak	Spacewatch	·	1.7 km	MPC · JPL
331479	1997 WS_{11}	—	November 22, 1997	Kitt Peak	Spacewatch	·	1.4 km	MPC · JPL
331480	1997 WP_{15}	—	November 23, 1997	Kitt Peak	Spacewatch	·	1.7 km	MPC · JPL
331481	1998 KH_{12}	—	May 27, 1998	Kitt Peak	Spacewatch	·	2.7 km	MPC · JPL
331482	1998 RM_{23}	—	September 14, 1998	Socorro	LINEAR	·	1.4 km	MPC · JPL
331483	1998 SY_{49}	—	September 25, 1998	Kitt Peak	Spacewatch	3:2	7.0 km	MPC · JPL
331484	1998 UX	—	October 18, 1998	Catalina	CSS	PHO	1.6 km	MPC · JPL
331485	1998 VM_{43}	—	November 15, 1998	Kitt Peak	Spacewatch	·	1.2 km	MPC · JPL
331486	1998 VQ_{56}	—	November 10, 1998	Anderson Mesa	LONEOS	PHO	1.4 km	MPC · JPL
331487	1998 WA_{30}	—	November 24, 1998	Kitt Peak	Spacewatch	·	2.1 km	MPC · JPL
331488	1998 YT_{33}	—	December 22, 1998	Kitt Peak	Spacewatch	·	1.4 km	MPC · JPL
331489	1999 BA_{31}	—	January 19, 1999	Kitt Peak	Spacewatch	EOS	2.3 km	MPC · JPL
331490	1999 GB_{16}	—	April 9, 1999	Socorro	LINEAR	EUN	1.7 km	MPC · JPL
331491	1999 NK_{32}	—	July 14, 1999	Socorro	LINEAR	·	2.1 km	MPC · JPL
331492	1999 RG_{168}	—	September 9, 1999	Socorro	LINEAR	·	2.6 km	MPC · JPL
331493	1999 RU_{199}	—	September 8, 1999	Socorro	LINEAR	ADE	3.1 km	MPC · JPL
331494	1999 RN_{205}	—	September 8, 1999	Socorro	LINEAR	·	2.8 km	MPC · JPL
331495	1999 RY_{221}	—	September 6, 1999	Catalina	CSS	·	970 m	MPC · JPL
331496	1999 RN_{238}	—	September 8, 1999	Socorro	LINEAR	(18466)	3.0 km	MPC · JPL
331497	1999 TK_{76}	—	October 10, 1999	Kitt Peak	Spacewatch	·	670 m	MPC · JPL
331498	1999 TX_{123}	—	October 15, 1999	Socorro	LINEAR	·	2.4 km	MPC · JPL
331499	1999 TR_{170}	—	October 10, 1999	Socorro	LINEAR	(18466)	3.3 km	MPC · JPL
331500	1999 TH_{232}	—	October 5, 1999	Anderson Mesa	LONEOS	·	2.8 km	MPC · JPL

== 331501–331600 ==
back to top

Designation			Discovery			Properties		Ref
Permanent	Provisional	Named after	Date	Site	Discoverer(s)	Category	Diam.	Ref
331501	1999 TS_{272}	—	October 3, 1999	Socorro	LINEAR	·	3.7 km	MPC · JPL
331502	1999 TH_{307}	—	October 3, 1999	Kitt Peak	Spacewatch	·	2.8 km	MPC · JPL
331503	1999 TF_{315}	—	October 9, 1999	Socorro	LINEAR	·	2.3 km	MPC · JPL
331504	1999 UJ_{16}	—	October 29, 1999	Catalina	CSS	·	2.6 km	MPC · JPL
331505	1999 UN_{36}	—	October 16, 1999	Kitt Peak	Spacewatch	·	1.8 km	MPC · JPL
331506	1999 VC_{12}	—	November 10, 1999	Fountain Hills	C. W. Juels	·	2.4 km	MPC · JPL
331507	1999 XQ_{117}	—	December 5, 1999	Catalina	CSS	·	3.2 km	MPC · JPL
331508	1999 XC_{261}	—	December 8, 1999	Socorro	LINEAR	·	3.0 km	MPC · JPL
331509	1999 YA	—	December 16, 1999	Socorro	LINEAR	AMO +1km	800 m	MPC · JPL
331510	2000 AE_{6}	—	January 4, 2000	Socorro	LINEAR	AMO +1km	1.0 km	MPC · JPL
331511	2000 AU_{223}	—	January 9, 2000	Kitt Peak	Spacewatch	·	3.4 km	MPC · JPL
331512	2000 BP_{41}	—	January 30, 2000	Kitt Peak	Spacewatch	·	1.2 km	MPC · JPL
331513	2000 CU_{19}	—	January 11, 2000	Socorro	LINEAR	·	3.1 km	MPC · JPL
331514	2000 DO_{78}	—	February 29, 2000	Socorro	LINEAR	EUN	1.2 km	MPC · JPL
331515	2000 DS_{95}	—	February 28, 2000	Socorro	LINEAR	·	5.4 km	MPC · JPL
331516	2000 EA_{147}	—	March 4, 2000	Socorro	LINEAR	·	3.8 km	MPC · JPL
331517	2000 FW_{4}	—	March 27, 2000	Kitt Peak	Spacewatch	·	2.5 km	MPC · JPL
331518	2000 JE_{31}	—	May 7, 2000	Socorro	LINEAR	·	2.5 km	MPC · JPL
331519	2000 NJ_{19}	—	July 5, 2000	Anderson Mesa	LONEOS	·	1.3 km	MPC · JPL
331520	2000 QV_{32}	—	August 26, 2000	Socorro	LINEAR	·	2.9 km	MPC · JPL
331521	2000 QY_{40}	—	August 24, 2000	Socorro	LINEAR	·	850 m	MPC · JPL
331522	2000 QD_{70}	—	August 24, 2000	Socorro	LINEAR	·	1.2 km	MPC · JPL
331523	2000 QE_{202}	—	August 29, 2000	Socorro	LINEAR	·	1.9 km	MPC · JPL
331524	2000 RJ	—	September 1, 2000	Socorro	LINEAR	·	1.9 km	MPC · JPL
331525	2000 RM_{103}	—	September 5, 2000	Anderson Mesa	LONEOS	·	1.5 km	MPC · JPL
331526	2000 SF_{5}	—	September 22, 2000	Socorro	LINEAR	·	1.3 km	MPC · JPL
331527	2000 SM_{21}	—	September 24, 2000	Socorro	LINEAR	·	1.6 km	MPC · JPL
331528	2000 SY_{95}	—	September 23, 2000	Socorro	LINEAR	(5)	1.3 km	MPC · JPL
331529	2000 SR_{126}	—	September 24, 2000	Socorro	LINEAR	·	2.5 km	MPC · JPL
331530	2000 SM_{135}	—	September 23, 2000	Socorro	LINEAR	·	2.4 km	MPC · JPL
331531	2000 SO_{143}	—	September 24, 2000	Socorro	LINEAR	·	2.2 km	MPC · JPL
331532	2000 SJ_{192}	—	September 24, 2000	Socorro	LINEAR	(5)	1.5 km	MPC · JPL
331533	2000 SG_{204}	—	September 24, 2000	Socorro	LINEAR	·	1.9 km	MPC · JPL
331534	2000 SC_{254}	—	September 24, 2000	Socorro	LINEAR	(5)	1.5 km	MPC · JPL
331535	2000 SN_{273}	—	September 28, 2000	Socorro	LINEAR	·	2.0 km	MPC · JPL
331536	2000 SC_{284}	—	September 23, 2000	Socorro	LINEAR	·	1.7 km	MPC · JPL
331537	2000 SR_{314}	—	September 28, 2000	Socorro	LINEAR	MAR	1.5 km	MPC · JPL
331538	2000 SO_{340}	—	September 24, 2000	Socorro	LINEAR	·	1.6 km	MPC · JPL
331539	2000 SX_{348}	—	September 30, 2000	Anderson Mesa	LONEOS	·	1.7 km	MPC · JPL
331540	2000 SC_{349}	—	September 30, 2000	Anderson Mesa	LONEOS	(194)	2.2 km	MPC · JPL
331541	2000 TQ_{20}	—	October 1, 2000	Socorro	LINEAR	·	2.3 km	MPC · JPL
331542	2000 TZ_{34}	—	October 6, 2000	Anderson Mesa	LONEOS	·	1.6 km	MPC · JPL
331543	2000 TT_{36}	—	October 6, 2000	Anderson Mesa	LONEOS	·	4.6 km	MPC · JPL
331544	2000 TG_{54}	—	October 1, 2000	Socorro	LINEAR	·	1.6 km	MPC · JPL
331545	2000 UE_{59}	—	October 25, 2000	Socorro	LINEAR	·	2.9 km	MPC · JPL
331546	2000 UG_{68}	—	October 25, 2000	Socorro	LINEAR	·	2.8 km	MPC · JPL
331547	2000 VL_{39}	—	November 1, 2000	Socorro	LINEAR	·	1.3 km	MPC · JPL
331548	2000 VO_{47}	—	November 1, 2000	Socorro	LINEAR	·	3.5 km	MPC · JPL
331549	2000 WG_{18}	—	November 21, 2000	Socorro	LINEAR	·	900 m	MPC · JPL
331550	2000 WP_{53}	—	November 27, 2000	Kitt Peak	Spacewatch	·	830 m	MPC · JPL
331551	2000 WL_{54}	—	November 20, 2000	Socorro	LINEAR	·	1.7 km	MPC · JPL
331552	2000 WH_{65}	—	November 28, 2000	Kitt Peak	Spacewatch	·	2.2 km	MPC · JPL
331553	2000 WZ_{71}	—	November 19, 2000	Socorro	LINEAR	·	1.7 km	MPC · JPL
331554	2000 WH_{160}	—	November 20, 2000	Anderson Mesa	LONEOS	·	1.9 km	MPC · JPL
331555	2000 XA_{2}	—	December 1, 2000	Socorro	LINEAR	H	2.6 km	MPC · JPL
331556	2000 XE_{54}	—	December 15, 2000	Uccle	T. Pauwels	·	860 m	MPC · JPL
331557	2000 YZ_{14}	—	December 20, 2000	Uccle	T. Pauwels	·	2.1 km	MPC · JPL
331558	2001 BJ_{6}	—	January 19, 2001	Socorro	LINEAR	·	4.7 km	MPC · JPL
331559	2001 DV_{24}	—	February 17, 2001	Socorro	LINEAR	DOR	3.5 km	MPC · JPL
331560	2001 HB_{40}	—	April 29, 2001	Kitt Peak	Spacewatch	·	990 m	MPC · JPL
331561	2001 KO_{19}	—	May 21, 2001	Socorro	LINEAR	·	1.3 km	MPC · JPL
331562	2001 MS_{7}	—	June 23, 2001	Palomar	NEAT	·	3.4 km	MPC · JPL
331563	2001 OJ_{18}	—	July 17, 2001	Haleakala	NEAT	·	4.9 km	MPC · JPL
331564	2001 OF_{27}	—	July 10, 2001	Palomar	NEAT	PHO	1.3 km	MPC · JPL
331565	2001 OU_{31}	—	July 23, 2001	Palomar	NEAT	·	4.0 km	MPC · JPL
331566	2001 PY_{9}	—	August 8, 2001	Haleakala	NEAT	·	1.6 km	MPC · JPL
331567	2001 PR_{57}	—	August 14, 2001	Haleakala	NEAT	·	3.4 km	MPC · JPL
331568	2001 QE_{37}	—	August 16, 2001	Socorro	LINEAR	·	4.2 km	MPC · JPL
331569	2001 QO_{52}	—	August 16, 2001	Socorro	LINEAR	NYS	1.6 km	MPC · JPL
331570	2001 QS_{67}	—	August 19, 2001	Socorro	LINEAR	·	2.2 km	MPC · JPL
331571	2001 QH_{92}	—	August 19, 2001	Socorro	LINEAR	·	3.3 km	MPC · JPL
331572	2001 QC_{168}	—	August 24, 2001	Haleakala	NEAT	·	1.4 km	MPC · JPL
331573	2001 QL_{197}	—	August 22, 2001	Palomar	NEAT	PHO	1.5 km	MPC · JPL
331574	2001 QW_{226}	—	August 24, 2001	Anderson Mesa	LONEOS	·	1.6 km	MPC · JPL
331575	2001 QV_{228}	—	August 24, 2001	Anderson Mesa	LONEOS	·	1.8 km	MPC · JPL
331576	2001 QR_{264}	—	August 26, 2001	Anderson Mesa	LONEOS	·	4.5 km	MPC · JPL
331577	2001 QR_{275}	—	August 19, 2001	Socorro	LINEAR	·	5.0 km	MPC · JPL
331578	2001 RS_{65}	—	September 10, 2001	Socorro	LINEAR	·	4.4 km	MPC · JPL
331579	2001 RD_{72}	—	September 10, 2001	Socorro	LINEAR	THB	4.5 km	MPC · JPL
331580	2001 RP_{90}	—	September 11, 2001	Anderson Mesa	LONEOS	NYS	1.1 km	MPC · JPL
331581	2001 SO_{13}	—	September 16, 2001	Socorro	LINEAR	NYS	1.4 km	MPC · JPL
331582	2001 SD_{80}	—	September 20, 2001	Socorro	LINEAR	·	1.2 km	MPC · JPL
331583	2001 SV_{119}	—	September 16, 2001	Socorro	LINEAR	·	2.8 km	MPC · JPL
331584	2001 SE_{143}	—	September 16, 2001	Socorro	LINEAR	·	1.4 km	MPC · JPL
331585	2001 SP_{143}	—	September 16, 2001	Socorro	LINEAR	·	1.5 km	MPC · JPL
331586	2001 SU_{206}	—	September 19, 2001	Socorro	LINEAR	HYG	3.0 km	MPC · JPL
331587	2001 TW	—	October 9, 2001	Socorro	LINEAR	T_{j} (2.91)	3.8 km	MPC · JPL
331588	2001 TZ_{22}	—	October 13, 2001	Socorro	LINEAR	(69559)	3.6 km	MPC · JPL
331589	2001 TN_{103}	—	October 14, 2001	Socorro	LINEAR	H	730 m	MPC · JPL
331590	2001 TY_{132}	—	October 12, 2001	Haleakala	NEAT	·	1.6 km	MPC · JPL
331591	2001 TY_{170}	—	October 15, 2001	Haleakala	NEAT	·	6.5 km	MPC · JPL
331592	2001 TQ_{248}	—	October 14, 2001	Apache Point	SDSS	·	1.8 km	MPC · JPL
331593	2001 UJ_{97}	—	October 17, 2001	Socorro	LINEAR	·	1.6 km	MPC · JPL
331594	2001 UL_{106}	—	October 20, 2001	Socorro	LINEAR	·	2.1 km	MPC · JPL
331595	2001 UF_{208}	—	October 20, 2001	Kitt Peak	Spacewatch	·	1.0 km	MPC · JPL
331596	2001 UT_{221}	—	October 24, 2001	Socorro	LINEAR	·	1.6 km	MPC · JPL
331597	2001 VG_{12}	—	November 10, 2001	Socorro	LINEAR	T_{j} (2.95)	4.2 km	MPC · JPL
331598	2001 VR_{20}	—	November 9, 2001	Socorro	LINEAR	·	1.5 km	MPC · JPL
331599	2001 VW_{80}	—	November 10, 2001	Palomar	NEAT	HNS	1.8 km	MPC · JPL
331600	2001 VH_{89}	—	November 12, 2001	Socorro	LINEAR	PHO	1.7 km	MPC · JPL

== 331601–331700 ==
back to top

Designation			Discovery			Properties		Ref
Permanent	Provisional	Named after	Date	Site	Discoverer(s)	Category	Diam.	Ref
331601	2001 WL_{17}	—	November 17, 2001	Socorro	LINEAR	NYS	1.3 km	MPC · JPL
331602	2001 WZ_{46}	—	November 20, 2001	Socorro	LINEAR	·	1.4 km	MPC · JPL
331603	2001 WM_{51}	—	October 14, 2001	Socorro	LINEAR	·	3.7 km	MPC · JPL
331604	2001 WD_{98}	—	October 18, 2001	Kitt Peak	Spacewatch	·	1.7 km	MPC · JPL
331605 Guidogryseels	2001 XB_{5}	Guidogryseels	December 10, 2001	Uccle	T. Pauwels	slow	2.2 km	MPC · JPL
331606	2001 XB_{19}	—	December 9, 2001	Socorro	LINEAR	·	2.4 km	MPC · JPL
331607	2001 XA_{96}	—	December 10, 2001	Socorro	LINEAR	·	1.8 km	MPC · JPL
331608	2001 XA_{112}	—	December 11, 2001	Socorro	LINEAR	·	2.3 km	MPC · JPL
331609	2001 XN_{216}	—	December 14, 2001	Socorro	LINEAR	·	1.9 km	MPC · JPL
331610	2001 XK_{245}	—	December 15, 2001	Socorro	LINEAR	·	4.0 km	MPC · JPL
331611	2001 XJ_{250}	—	December 14, 2001	Socorro	LINEAR	·	2.5 km	MPC · JPL
331612	2001 YD_{24}	—	December 18, 2001	Socorro	LINEAR	·	1.8 km	MPC · JPL
331613	2001 YB_{88}	—	December 18, 2001	Socorro	LINEAR	·	1.9 km	MPC · JPL
331614	2001 YA_{137}	—	December 22, 2001	Socorro	LINEAR	·	2.9 km	MPC · JPL
331615	2002 AQ_{38}	—	January 9, 2002	Socorro	LINEAR	·	3.1 km	MPC · JPL
331616	2002 AP_{39}	—	January 9, 2002	Socorro	LINEAR	HNS	1.5 km	MPC · JPL
331617	2002 AZ_{68}	—	January 13, 2002	Kitt Peak	Spacewatch	WIT	1.1 km	MPC · JPL
331618	2002 AL_{82}	—	January 9, 2002	Socorro	LINEAR	EUN	1.6 km	MPC · JPL
331619	2002 AO_{84}	—	January 9, 2002	Socorro	LINEAR	·	1.6 km	MPC · JPL
331620	2002 AY_{102}	—	January 8, 2002	Socorro	LINEAR	·	1.4 km	MPC · JPL
331621	2002 CT_{5}	—	February 4, 2002	Haleakala	NEAT	·	2.6 km	MPC · JPL
331622	2002 CL_{36}	—	January 14, 2002	Socorro	LINEAR	GEF	1.5 km	MPC · JPL
331623	2002 CS_{130}	—	February 7, 2002	Socorro	LINEAR	HNS	1.4 km	MPC · JPL
331624	2002 CR_{232}	—	February 10, 2002	Socorro	LINEAR	·	2.1 km	MPC · JPL
331625	2002 CE_{272}	—	February 8, 2002	Palomar	NEAT	·	3.6 km	MPC · JPL
331626	2002 DM_{5}	—	February 16, 2002	Haleakala	NEAT	·	2.0 km	MPC · JPL
331627	2002 EM_{62}	—	March 13, 2002	Socorro	LINEAR	·	3.2 km	MPC · JPL
331628	2002 FU_{4}	—	February 8, 2002	Anderson Mesa	LONEOS	·	2.5 km	MPC · JPL
331629	2002 GD_{28}	—	April 6, 2002	Cerro Tololo	M. W. Buie	·	2.9 km	MPC · JPL
331630	2002 GB_{59}	—	April 8, 2002	Palomar	NEAT	MAS	780 m	MPC · JPL
331631	2002 GS_{70}	—	April 8, 2002	Palomar	NEAT	BRA	2.1 km	MPC · JPL
331632	2002 GE_{117}	—	April 11, 2002	Socorro	LINEAR	·	1.4 km	MPC · JPL
331633	2002 GQ_{124}	—	April 12, 2002	Kitt Peak	Spacewatch	·	3.1 km	MPC · JPL
331634	2002 GW_{180}	—	April 12, 2002	Palomar	NEAT	(5)	2.4 km	MPC · JPL
331635	2002 GC_{184}	—	April 14, 2002	Palomar	NEAT	AGN	1.2 km	MPC · JPL
331636	2002 JK_{7}	—	May 4, 2002	Palomar	NEAT	·	1.6 km	MPC · JPL
331637	2002 JZ_{108}	—	May 6, 2002	Socorro	LINEAR	H	750 m	MPC · JPL
331638	2002 JP_{123}	—	May 6, 2002	Palomar	NEAT	·	2.3 km	MPC · JPL
331639	2002 NS_{3}	—	July 8, 2002	Palomar	NEAT	·	6.0 km	MPC · JPL
331640	2002 ND_{5}	—	July 10, 2002	Campo Imperatore	CINEOS	·	3.0 km	MPC · JPL
331641	2002 NW_{35}	—	July 9, 2002	Socorro	LINEAR	·	4.2 km	MPC · JPL
331642	2002 NQ_{36}	—	July 9, 2002	Socorro	LINEAR	·	3.7 km	MPC · JPL
331643	2002 NQ_{39}	—	July 14, 2002	Socorro	LINEAR	·	600 m	MPC · JPL
331644	2002 NN_{58}	—	July 12, 2002	Palomar	NEAT	·	770 m	MPC · JPL
331645	2002 NX_{68}	—	July 14, 2002	Palomar	NEAT	·	650 m	MPC · JPL
331646	2002 NU_{72}	—	July 8, 2002	Palomar	NEAT	EOS	2.5 km	MPC · JPL
331647	2002 NF_{79}	—	October 23, 2003	Kitt Peak	Spacewatch	·	2.9 km	MPC · JPL
331648	2002 OQ_{31}	—	July 17, 2002	Palomar	NEAT	·	5.5 km	MPC · JPL
331649	2002 OJ_{32}	—	July 20, 2002	Palomar	NEAT	·	2.6 km	MPC · JPL
331650	2002 OJ_{34}	—	July 22, 2002	Palomar	NEAT	·	2.3 km	MPC · JPL
331651	2002 PX_{2}	—	August 3, 2002	Palomar	NEAT	·	1.2 km	MPC · JPL
331652	2002 PN_{5}	—	August 4, 2002	Palomar	NEAT	·	3.1 km	MPC · JPL
331653	2002 PB_{9}	—	August 5, 2002	Palomar	NEAT	·	1.7 km	MPC · JPL
331654	2002 PK_{16}	—	August 6, 2002	Palomar	NEAT	·	2.1 km	MPC · JPL
331655	2002 PR_{25}	—	August 6, 2002	Palomar	NEAT	·	2.7 km	MPC · JPL
331656	2002 PP_{30}	—	August 6, 2002	Palomar	NEAT	·	2.5 km	MPC · JPL
331657	2002 PF_{33}	—	August 5, 2002	Campo Imperatore	CINEOS	·	660 m	MPC · JPL
331658	2002 PC_{39}	—	August 6, 2002	Palomar	NEAT	EOS	2.4 km	MPC · JPL
331659	2002 PH_{90}	—	August 11, 2002	Socorro	LINEAR	·	4.0 km	MPC · JPL
331660	2002 PS_{101}	—	August 12, 2002	Socorro	LINEAR	·	660 m	MPC · JPL
331661	2002 PG_{102}	—	August 12, 2002	Socorro	LINEAR	·	1.8 km	MPC · JPL
331662	2002 PT_{103}	—	August 12, 2002	Socorro	LINEAR	·	4.0 km	MPC · JPL
331663	2002 PN_{105}	—	August 12, 2002	Socorro	LINEAR	·	1.1 km	MPC · JPL
331664	2002 PC_{106}	—	August 12, 2002	Socorro	LINEAR	EOS	2.1 km	MPC · JPL
331665	2002 PB_{137}	—	August 15, 2002	Palomar	NEAT	·	3.4 km	MPC · JPL
331666	2002 PR_{138}	—	August 11, 2002	Socorro	LINEAR	·	3.3 km	MPC · JPL
331667	2002 PP_{162}	—	August 8, 2002	Palomar	S. F. Hönig	·	970 m	MPC · JPL
331668	2002 PK_{167}	—	August 8, 2002	Palomar	NEAT	·	3.2 km	MPC · JPL
331669	2002 PL_{168}	—	August 8, 2002	Palomar	NEAT	·	2.8 km	MPC · JPL
331670	2002 PF_{178}	—	August 15, 2002	Palomar	NEAT	·	890 m	MPC · JPL
331671	2002 PO_{181}	—	August 15, 2002	Palomar	NEAT	·	3.4 km	MPC · JPL
331672	2002 PF_{184}	—	August 15, 2002	Palomar	NEAT	·	2.3 km	MPC · JPL
331673	2002 PS_{184}	—	August 8, 2002	Palomar	NEAT	·	830 m	MPC · JPL
331674	2002 PU_{188}	—	August 8, 2002	Palomar	NEAT	·	2.4 km	MPC · JPL
331675	2002 PB_{194}	—	February 3, 2009	Mount Lemmon	Mount Lemmon Survey	HNS	1.0 km	MPC · JPL
331676	2002 PA_{195}	—	February 2, 2008	Kitt Peak	Spacewatch	·	830 m	MPC · JPL
331677	2002 PS_{199}	—	July 29, 2008	Kitt Peak	Spacewatch	·	3.3 km	MPC · JPL
331678	2002 QC_{10}	—	August 20, 2002	Kvistaberg	Uppsala-DLR Asteroid Survey	·	760 m	MPC · JPL
331679	2002 QG_{13}	—	August 26, 2002	Palomar	NEAT	·	3.1 km	MPC · JPL
331680	2002 QY_{24}	—	August 28, 2002	Socorro	LINEAR	·	4.8 km	MPC · JPL
331681	2002 QY_{65}	—	August 17, 2002	Palomar	NEAT	·	650 m	MPC · JPL
331682	2002 QK_{77}	—	August 17, 2002	Palomar	NEAT	·	670 m	MPC · JPL
331683	2002 QF_{79}	—	December 20, 2004	Mount Lemmon	Mount Lemmon Survey	·	2.2 km	MPC · JPL
331684	2002 QJ_{90}	—	August 30, 2002	Palomar	NEAT	·	4.1 km	MPC · JPL
331685	2002 QB_{92}	—	August 28, 2002	Palomar	NEAT	·	590 m	MPC · JPL
331686	2002 QR_{101}	—	August 16, 2002	Palomar	NEAT	·	3.4 km	MPC · JPL
331687	2002 QF_{104}	—	August 26, 2002	Palomar	NEAT	·	700 m	MPC · JPL
331688	2002 QB_{112}	—	August 16, 2002	Palomar	NEAT	·	4.4 km	MPC · JPL
331689	2002 QX_{116}	—	August 29, 2002	Palomar	NEAT	·	790 m	MPC · JPL
331690	2002 QS_{119}	—	August 17, 2002	Palomar	NEAT	PHO	960 m	MPC · JPL
331691	2002 QB_{122}	—	August 16, 2002	Palomar	NEAT	·	2.4 km	MPC · JPL
331692	2002 QK_{127}	—	August 18, 2002	Palomar	NEAT	EOS	2.4 km	MPC · JPL
331693	2002 QR_{130}	—	August 30, 2002	Palomar	NEAT	·	4.7 km	MPC · JPL
331694	2002 QR_{141}	—	November 24, 2003	Kitt Peak	Spacewatch	·	4.0 km	MPC · JPL
331695	2002 QQ_{142}	—	September 30, 2008	Catalina	CSS	VER	3.3 km	MPC · JPL
331696	2002 QA_{148}	—	October 4, 2006	Mount Lemmon	Mount Lemmon Survey	·	860 m	MPC · JPL
331697	2002 RX_{4}	—	September 3, 2002	Palomar	NEAT	·	6.3 km	MPC · JPL
331698	2002 RS_{44}	—	September 5, 2002	Socorro	LINEAR	·	2.2 km	MPC · JPL
331699	2002 RT_{45}	—	September 5, 2002	Socorro	LINEAR	·	1.1 km	MPC · JPL
331700	2002 RO_{46}	—	September 5, 2002	Socorro	LINEAR	·	730 m	MPC · JPL

== 331701–331800 ==
back to top

Designation			Discovery			Properties		Ref
Permanent	Provisional	Named after	Date	Site	Discoverer(s)	Category	Diam.	Ref
331701	2002 RC_{55}	—	September 5, 2002	Anderson Mesa	LONEOS	V	820 m	MPC · JPL
331702	2002 RJ_{69}	—	September 4, 2002	Anderson Mesa	LONEOS	·	3.2 km	MPC · JPL
331703	2002 RB_{71}	—	September 4, 2002	Palomar	NEAT	·	2.3 km	MPC · JPL
331704	2002 RV_{72}	—	September 5, 2002	Socorro	LINEAR	·	2.1 km	MPC · JPL
331705	2002 RV_{89}	—	September 5, 2002	Socorro	LINEAR	NYS	1.2 km	MPC · JPL
331706	2002 RN_{92}	—	September 5, 2002	Socorro	LINEAR	·	2.1 km	MPC · JPL
331707	2002 RK_{105}	—	September 5, 2002	Socorro	LINEAR	ERI	2.0 km	MPC · JPL
331708	2002 RU_{143}	—	September 11, 2002	Palomar	NEAT	·	800 m	MPC · JPL
331709	2002 RC_{151}	—	September 12, 2002	Palomar	NEAT	·	3.9 km	MPC · JPL
331710	2002 RK_{185}	—	September 12, 2002	Palomar	NEAT	EOS	2.4 km	MPC · JPL
331711	2002 RF_{186}	—	September 12, 2002	Palomar	NEAT	·	4.0 km	MPC · JPL
331712	2002 RY_{201}	—	September 13, 2002	Anderson Mesa	LONEOS	·	3.7 km	MPC · JPL
331713	2002 RF_{240}	—	September 14, 2002	Palomar	R. Matson	·	730 m	MPC · JPL
331714	2002 RS_{253}	—	March 8, 2005	Mount Lemmon	Mount Lemmon Survey	·	1.9 km	MPC · JPL
331715	2002 RF_{255}	—	September 15, 2002	Palomar	NEAT	·	1.7 km	MPC · JPL
331716	2002 RU_{255}	—	March 5, 2006	Kitt Peak	Spacewatch	·	3.3 km	MPC · JPL
331717	2002 RV_{280}	—	January 17, 2005	Kitt Peak	Spacewatch	EOS	2.3 km	MPC · JPL
331718	2002 RM_{287}	—	August 16, 2002	Kitt Peak	Spacewatch	GEF	1.1 km	MPC · JPL
331719	2002 SS_{55}	—	September 30, 2002	Socorro	LINEAR	·	1.1 km	MPC · JPL
331720	2002 SC_{59}	—	September 16, 2002	Palomar	NEAT	HYG	3.8 km	MPC · JPL
331721	2002 SJ_{73}	—	September 16, 2002	Palomar	NEAT	·	4.7 km	MPC · JPL
331722	2002 TR_{10}	—	October 1, 2002	Anderson Mesa	LONEOS	·	1.7 km	MPC · JPL
331723	2002 TG_{71}	—	October 3, 2002	Palomar	NEAT	EOS	2.8 km	MPC · JPL
331724	2002 TB_{73}	—	October 3, 2002	Palomar	NEAT	V	920 m	MPC · JPL
331725	2002 TO_{86}	—	September 17, 2002	Haleakala	NEAT	·	3.9 km	MPC · JPL
331726	2002 TU_{90}	—	October 3, 2002	Palomar	NEAT	·	1.3 km	MPC · JPL
331727	2002 TC_{99}	—	October 3, 2002	Socorro	LINEAR	·	1.7 km	MPC · JPL
331728	2002 TP_{103}	—	October 4, 2002	Socorro	LINEAR	·	3.7 km	MPC · JPL
331729	2002 TW_{112}	—	October 3, 2002	Socorro	LINEAR	TIR	3.8 km	MPC · JPL
331730	2002 TM_{123}	—	October 4, 2002	Palomar	NEAT	·	4.2 km	MPC · JPL
331731	2002 TW_{126}	—	October 4, 2002	Socorro	LINEAR	·	790 m	MPC · JPL
331732	2002 TJ_{128}	—	October 4, 2002	Palomar	NEAT	EOS	2.6 km	MPC · JPL
331733	2002 TS_{138}	—	October 4, 2002	Anderson Mesa	LONEOS	·	4.2 km	MPC · JPL
331734	2002 TS_{158}	—	October 5, 2002	Palomar	NEAT	·	4.2 km	MPC · JPL
331735	2002 TE_{169}	—	October 3, 2002	Palomar	NEAT	·	4.4 km	MPC · JPL
331736	2002 TE_{185}	—	October 4, 2002	Socorro	LINEAR	·	4.2 km	MPC · JPL
331737	2002 TV_{217}	—	October 8, 2002	Kitt Peak	Spacewatch	·	820 m	MPC · JPL
331738	2002 TL_{218}	—	October 5, 2002	Socorro	LINEAR	·	1.2 km	MPC · JPL
331739	2002 TC_{263}	—	October 10, 2002	Palomar	NEAT	·	3.3 km	MPC · JPL
331740	2002 TJ_{274}	—	October 9, 2002	Socorro	LINEAR	·	3.3 km	MPC · JPL
331741	2002 TZ_{278}	—	October 10, 2002	Socorro	LINEAR	EOS	3.0 km	MPC · JPL
331742	2002 TE_{279}	—	October 10, 2002	Socorro	LINEAR	·	1.8 km	MPC · JPL
331743	2002 TT_{293}	—	October 11, 2002	Palomar	NEAT	·	2.5 km	MPC · JPL
331744	2002 TP_{308}	—	October 4, 2002	Apache Point	SDSS	·	770 m	MPC · JPL
331745	2002 TW_{347}	—	October 5, 2002	Apache Point	SDSS	V	630 m	MPC · JPL
331746	2002 TN_{352}	—	October 10, 2002	Apache Point	SDSS	·	550 m	MPC · JPL
331747	2002 TJ_{383}	—	October 5, 2002	Apache Point	SDSS	LUT	4.7 km	MPC · JPL
331748	2002 UE_{22}	—	October 30, 2002	Haleakala	NEAT	EUP	7.0 km	MPC · JPL
331749	2002 UM_{41}	—	October 31, 2002	Palomar	NEAT	·	1.2 km	MPC · JPL
331750	2002 VX_{13}	—	October 6, 2002	Socorro	LINEAR	H	630 m	MPC · JPL
331751	2002 VN_{21}	—	November 5, 2002	Socorro	LINEAR	·	2.2 km	MPC · JPL
331752	2002 VY_{66}	—	November 6, 2002	Anderson Mesa	LONEOS	·	810 m	MPC · JPL
331753	2002 VL_{120}	—	November 12, 2002	Palomar	NEAT	EOS	3.2 km	MPC · JPL
331754	2002 VO_{136}	—	November 14, 2002	Socorro	LINEAR	·	1.1 km	MPC · JPL
331755	2002 VY_{144}	—	November 4, 2002	Palomar	NEAT	MAS	710 m	MPC · JPL
331756	2002 VF_{148}	—	February 18, 2004	Kitt Peak	Spacewatch	·	3.2 km	MPC · JPL
331757	2002 WH_{6}	—	November 24, 2002	Palomar	NEAT	T_{j} (2.99)	6.9 km	MPC · JPL
331758	2002 XH_{9}	—	November 24, 2002	Palomar	NEAT	·	1.5 km	MPC · JPL
331759	2002 XA_{19}	—	December 2, 2002	Socorro	LINEAR	PHO	3.3 km	MPC · JPL
331760	2002 XR_{24}	—	December 5, 2002	Socorro	LINEAR	MAS	780 m	MPC · JPL
331761	2002 XS_{32}	—	December 6, 2002	Socorro	LINEAR	TIR	4.7 km	MPC · JPL
331762	2002 XR_{49}	—	November 12, 2002	Socorro	LINEAR	H	540 m	MPC · JPL
331763	2002 XG_{81}	—	December 11, 2002	Socorro	LINEAR	·	1.7 km	MPC · JPL
331764	2002 XW_{98}	—	December 5, 2002	Socorro	LINEAR	·	1.5 km	MPC · JPL
331765	2002 XS_{119}	—	December 10, 2002	Palomar	NEAT	·	3.0 km	MPC · JPL
331766	2002 YO_{5}	—	December 30, 2002	Socorro	LINEAR	·	3.1 km	MPC · JPL
331767	2002 YJ_{23}	—	December 31, 2002	Socorro	LINEAR	·	1.8 km	MPC · JPL
331768	2003 BC_{3}	—	January 26, 2003	Anderson Mesa	LONEOS	BAR	1.3 km	MPC · JPL
331769	2003 BQ_{35}	—	January 26, 2003	Kitt Peak	Spacewatch	AMO	380 m	MPC · JPL
331770	2003 BP_{53}	—	January 27, 2003	Socorro	LINEAR	·	1.4 km	MPC · JPL
331771	2003 CY_{21}	—	February 2, 2003	Goodricke-Pigott	Kessel, J. W.	·	1.6 km	MPC · JPL
331772	2003 DO_{12}	—	February 26, 2003	Campo Imperatore	CINEOS	(194)	1.6 km	MPC · JPL
331773	2003 EU_{15}	—	March 7, 2003	Palomar	NEAT	(5)	1.6 km	MPC · JPL
331774	2003 EQ_{38}	—	March 8, 2003	Anderson Mesa	LONEOS	·	3.5 km	MPC · JPL
331775	2003 ES_{39}	—	March 8, 2003	Socorro	LINEAR	·	1.8 km	MPC · JPL
331776	2003 EE_{53}	—	February 4, 2003	Palomar	NEAT	·	1.4 km	MPC · JPL
331777	2003 EF_{59}	—	March 12, 2003	Socorro	LINEAR	·	2.7 km	MPC · JPL
331778	2003 EN_{59}	—	March 10, 2003	Socorro	LINEAR	·	2.6 km	MPC · JPL
331779	2003 FY_{29}	—	March 25, 2003	Palomar	NEAT	·	1.6 km	MPC · JPL
331780	2003 FT_{33}	—	March 23, 2003	Kitt Peak	Spacewatch	·	1.5 km	MPC · JPL
331781	2003 FQ_{131}	—	March 27, 2003	Kitt Peak	Spacewatch	JUN	1.5 km	MPC · JPL
331782	2003 GQ_{43}	—	April 9, 2003	Socorro	LINEAR	·	2.6 km	MPC · JPL
331783	2003 GB_{44}	—	April 9, 2003	Socorro	LINEAR	JUN	1.4 km	MPC · JPL
331784	2003 GB_{56}	—	April 11, 2003	Kitt Peak	Spacewatch	·	2.0 km	MPC · JPL
331785 Sumners	2003 HL_{15}	Sumners	April 26, 2003	Needville	Beaver, D., J. Dellinger	·	2.3 km	MPC · JPL
331786	2003 HK_{30}	—	April 28, 2003	Anderson Mesa	LONEOS	EUN	1.9 km	MPC · JPL
331787	2003 JU_{8}	—	May 2, 2003	Kitt Peak	Spacewatch	·	2.5 km	MPC · JPL
331788	2003 JC_{14}	—	May 7, 2003	Catalina	CSS	JUN	1.4 km	MPC · JPL
331789	2003 KO_{14}	—	May 25, 2003	Kitt Peak	Spacewatch	EUN	1.6 km	MPC · JPL
331790	2003 KE_{20}	—	May 30, 2003	Socorro	LINEAR	(194)	3.0 km	MPC · JPL
331791	2003 LP_{5}	—	June 5, 2003	Kitt Peak	Spacewatch	WIT	1.3 km	MPC · JPL
331792	2003 MT_{2}	—	June 25, 2003	Socorro	LINEAR	AMO +1km	1.3 km	MPC · JPL
331793	2003 MV_{4}	—	June 26, 2003	Socorro	LINEAR	·	2.6 km	MPC · JPL
331794	2003 MG_{6}	—	June 26, 2003	Haleakala	NEAT	·	2.9 km	MPC · JPL
331795	2003 MU_{9}	—	June 29, 2003	Socorro	LINEAR	·	2.5 km	MPC · JPL
331796	2003 OJ_{3}	—	July 22, 2003	Haleakala	NEAT	·	3.5 km	MPC · JPL
331797	2003 ON_{17}	—	July 28, 2003	Reedy Creek	J. Broughton	·	1.2 km	MPC · JPL
331798	2003 QP_{48}	—	August 21, 2003	Palomar	NEAT	·	1.3 km	MPC · JPL
331799	2003 QS_{58}	—	August 23, 2003	Palomar	NEAT	·	2.5 km	MPC · JPL
331800	2003 QR_{80}	—	August 22, 2003	Socorro	LINEAR	·	2.3 km	MPC · JPL

== 331801–331900 ==
back to top

Designation			Discovery			Properties		Ref
Permanent	Provisional	Named after	Date	Site	Discoverer(s)	Category	Diam.	Ref
331801	2003 QJ_{107}	—	August 31, 2003	Socorro	LINEAR	·	1.5 km	MPC · JPL
331802	2003 QA_{120}	—	August 28, 2003	Palomar	NEAT	·	3.0 km	MPC · JPL
331803	2003 RS_{15}	—	September 14, 2003	Haleakala	NEAT	GEF	1.9 km	MPC · JPL
331804	2003 RY_{15}	—	September 14, 2003	Haleakala	NEAT	·	730 m	MPC · JPL
331805	2003 SS_{10}	—	September 17, 2003	Kitt Peak	Spacewatch	MRX	1.2 km	MPC · JPL
331806	2003 SA_{15}	—	September 17, 2003	Kitt Peak	Spacewatch	·	5.0 km	MPC · JPL
331807	2003 SQ_{20}	—	September 16, 2003	Kitt Peak	Spacewatch	·	2.5 km	MPC · JPL
331808	2003 SJ_{52}	—	September 18, 2003	Palomar	NEAT	·	2.2 km	MPC · JPL
331809	2003 SQ_{71}	—	September 18, 2003	Kitt Peak	Spacewatch	DOR	2.5 km	MPC · JPL
331810	2003 SZ_{93}	—	September 18, 2003	Kitt Peak	Spacewatch	·	2.7 km	MPC · JPL
331811	2003 SU_{99}	—	September 19, 2003	Haleakala	NEAT	·	2.8 km	MPC · JPL
331812	2003 SH_{182}	—	September 20, 2003	Kitt Peak	Spacewatch	·	4.2 km	MPC · JPL
331813	2003 SL_{191}	—	September 19, 2003	Kitt Peak	Spacewatch	·	4.1 km	MPC · JPL
331814	2003 SH_{195}	—	September 20, 2003	Palomar	NEAT	·	2.4 km	MPC · JPL
331815	2003 SF_{249}	—	September 26, 2003	Socorro	LINEAR	·	2.3 km	MPC · JPL
331816	2003 SJ_{282}	—	September 19, 2003	Anderson Mesa	LONEOS	·	4.3 km	MPC · JPL
331817	2003 SV_{286}	—	September 21, 2003	Palomar	NEAT	·	1.8 km	MPC · JPL
331818	2003 SR_{292}	—	September 25, 2003	Palomar	NEAT	·	3.5 km	MPC · JPL
331819	2003 SG_{306}	—	September 30, 2003	Socorro	LINEAR	EOS	3.3 km	MPC · JPL
331820	2003 SE_{325}	—	September 17, 2003	Kitt Peak	Spacewatch	(13314)	2.2 km	MPC · JPL
331821	2003 SM_{377}	—	September 26, 2003	Apache Point	SDSS	MAS	860 m	MPC · JPL
331822	2003 SN_{392}	—	September 26, 2003	Apache Point	SDSS	·	850 m	MPC · JPL
331823	2003 SU_{404}	—	September 27, 2003	Apache Point	SDSS	·	3.8 km	MPC · JPL
331824	2003 SU_{424}	—	September 25, 2003	Mauna Kea	P. A. Wiegert	KOR	1.4 km	MPC · JPL
331825	2003 TC_{8}	—	October 1, 2003	Kitt Peak	Spacewatch	·	3.0 km	MPC · JPL
331826	2003 TW_{12}	—	October 15, 2003	Needville	J. Dellinger	·	3.1 km	MPC · JPL
331827	2003 TD_{17}	—	October 15, 2003	Anderson Mesa	LONEOS	·	2.6 km	MPC · JPL
331828	2003 TB_{39}	—	October 2, 2003	Kitt Peak	Spacewatch	·	2.2 km	MPC · JPL
331829	2003 TX_{42}	—	October 2, 2003	Kitt Peak	Spacewatch	·	2.4 km	MPC · JPL
331830	2003 UO	—	October 16, 2003	Palomar	NEAT	·	5.7 km	MPC · JPL
331831	2003 UF_{2}	—	October 16, 2003	Kitt Peak	Spacewatch	·	3.5 km	MPC · JPL
331832	2003 UT_{28}	—	October 22, 2003	Haleakala	NEAT	·	850 m	MPC · JPL
331833	2003 UD_{30}	—	October 1, 2003	Kitt Peak	Spacewatch	·	3.4 km	MPC · JPL
331834	2003 UC_{47}	—	October 21, 2003	Goodricke-Pigott	R. A. Tucker	·	3.1 km	MPC · JPL
331835	2003 UN_{56}	—	October 22, 2003	Socorro	LINEAR	·	3.5 km	MPC · JPL
331836	2003 UQ_{72}	—	October 19, 2003	Kitt Peak	Spacewatch	EOS	1.9 km	MPC · JPL
331837	2003 UL_{92}	—	October 20, 2003	Palomar	NEAT	EOS	2.7 km	MPC · JPL
331838	2003 UJ_{95}	—	October 18, 2003	Haleakala	NEAT	·	2.6 km	MPC · JPL
331839	2003 UB_{135}	—	September 27, 2003	Kitt Peak	Spacewatch	·	3.1 km	MPC · JPL
331840	2003 UA_{156}	—	October 20, 2003	Kitt Peak	Spacewatch	·	680 m	MPC · JPL
331841	2003 UO_{166}	—	October 21, 2003	Kitt Peak	Spacewatch	·	2.9 km	MPC · JPL
331842	2003 UM_{196}	—	October 21, 2003	Kitt Peak	Spacewatch	·	5.8 km	MPC · JPL
331843	2003 UM_{203}	—	October 21, 2003	Kitt Peak	Spacewatch	·	820 m	MPC · JPL
331844	2003 UT_{216}	—	October 21, 2003	Socorro	LINEAR	TIR	3.5 km	MPC · JPL
331845	2003 US_{227}	—	October 23, 2003	Kitt Peak	Spacewatch	·	2.9 km	MPC · JPL
331846	2003 UJ_{232}	—	October 24, 2003	Socorro	LINEAR	·	4.2 km	MPC · JPL
331847	2003 UV_{259}	—	October 25, 2003	Socorro	LINEAR	·	6.5 km	MPC · JPL
331848	2003 UB_{262}	—	October 26, 2003	Kitt Peak	Spacewatch	·	780 m	MPC · JPL
331849	2003 UG_{275}	—	October 29, 2003	Socorro	LINEAR	EOS	3.0 km	MPC · JPL
331850	2003 UH_{280}	—	October 27, 2003	Socorro	LINEAR	PHO	1.4 km	MPC · JPL
331851	2003 UR_{283}	—	October 30, 2003	Socorro	LINEAR	EOS	2.9 km	MPC · JPL
331852	2003 US_{336}	—	October 18, 2003	Apache Point	SDSS	·	2.6 km	MPC · JPL
331853	2003 US_{342}	—	October 19, 2003	Kitt Peak	Spacewatch	·	3.1 km	MPC · JPL
331854	2003 VH_{5}	—	November 15, 2003	Kitt Peak	Spacewatch	VER	5.3 km	MPC · JPL
331855	2003 VT_{8}	—	October 2, 2003	Kitt Peak	Spacewatch	·	3.0 km	MPC · JPL
331856	2003 WC_{4}	—	November 16, 2003	Catalina	CSS	EOS	2.0 km	MPC · JPL
331857	2003 WN_{7}	—	November 18, 2003	Socorro	LINEAR	·	4.3 km	MPC · JPL
331858	2003 WG_{69}	—	November 19, 2003	Kitt Peak	Spacewatch	·	910 m	MPC · JPL
331859	2003 WZ_{107}	—	November 20, 2003	Socorro	LINEAR	EOS	2.3 km	MPC · JPL
331860	2003 WQ_{144}	—	November 21, 2003	Socorro	LINEAR	·	950 m	MPC · JPL
331861	2003 WK_{148}	—	November 24, 2003	Kitt Peak	Spacewatch	HYG	3.0 km	MPC · JPL
331862	2003 WZ_{178}	—	November 20, 2003	Kitt Peak	Spacewatch	EOS	2.1 km	MPC · JPL
331863	2003 XV_{17}	—	December 13, 2003	Socorro	LINEAR	·	5.2 km	MPC · JPL
331864	2003 YW_{54}	—	December 19, 2003	Socorro	LINEAR	NYS	940 m	MPC · JPL
331865	2003 YZ_{55}	—	December 19, 2003	Socorro	LINEAR	·	5.3 km	MPC · JPL
331866	2003 YR_{79}	—	December 18, 2003	Socorro	LINEAR	·	3.7 km	MPC · JPL
331867	2003 YE_{93}	—	December 21, 2003	Socorro	LINEAR	·	3.4 km	MPC · JPL
331868	2003 YA_{111}	—	December 22, 2003	Kitt Peak	Spacewatch	·	4.0 km	MPC · JPL
331869	2003 YZ_{162}	—	December 17, 2003	Socorro	LINEAR	·	4.0 km	MPC · JPL
331870	2003 YR_{168}	—	December 18, 2003	Socorro	LINEAR	·	1.1 km	MPC · JPL
331871	2003 YL_{182}	—	December 17, 2003	Kitt Peak	Spacewatch	·	700 m	MPC · JPL
331872	2004 BU_{7}	—	January 17, 2004	Kitt Peak	Spacewatch	·	5.0 km	MPC · JPL
331873	2004 BP_{140}	—	January 19, 2004	Kitt Peak	Spacewatch	·	4.3 km	MPC · JPL
331874	2004 BA_{141}	—	January 19, 2004	Kitt Peak	Spacewatch	NYS	920 m	MPC · JPL
331875	2004 BZ_{144}	—	January 19, 2004	Kitt Peak	Spacewatch	·	1.3 km	MPC · JPL
331876	2004 CL	—	February 7, 2004	Anderson Mesa	LONEOS	APO · PHA	270 m	MPC · JPL
331877	2004 CV_{5}	—	February 10, 2004	Palomar	NEAT	·	940 m	MPC · JPL
331878	2004 CD_{15}	—	February 11, 2004	Palomar	NEAT	V	870 m	MPC · JPL
331879	2004 CY_{62}	—	February 12, 2004	Kitt Peak	Spacewatch	·	4.1 km	MPC · JPL
331880	2004 CK_{70}	—	February 12, 2004	Kitt Peak	Spacewatch	·	870 m	MPC · JPL
331881	2004 CB_{87}	—	February 11, 2004	Kitt Peak	Spacewatch	·	1.2 km	MPC · JPL
331882	2004 CR_{120}	—	February 12, 2004	Kitt Peak	Spacewatch	CYB	5.4 km	MPC · JPL
331883	2004 DQ_{35}	—	February 19, 2004	Socorro	LINEAR	·	2.1 km	MPC · JPL
331884	2004 ED_{3}	—	March 10, 2004	Palomar	NEAT	·	2.7 km	MPC · JPL
331885	2004 ET_{6}	—	March 12, 2004	Palomar	NEAT	·	1.2 km	MPC · JPL
331886	2004 EF_{23}	—	March 15, 2004	Catalina	CSS	·	1.5 km	MPC · JPL
331887	2004 EL_{67}	—	March 15, 2004	Kitt Peak	Spacewatch	MAS	840 m	MPC · JPL
331888	2004 EN_{95}	—	March 15, 2004	Palomar	NEAT	·	1.4 km	MPC · JPL
331889	2004 FN_{141}	—	March 27, 2004	Socorro	LINEAR	·	1.8 km	MPC · JPL
331890	2004 GO_{2}	—	April 12, 2004	Socorro	LINEAR	·	3.0 km	MPC · JPL
331891	2004 GT_{27}	—	April 15, 2004	Palomar	NEAT	PHO	1.2 km	MPC · JPL
331892	2004 JL_{12}	—	May 13, 2004	Socorro	LINEAR	·	1.7 km	MPC · JPL
331893	2004 JW_{49}	—	May 13, 2004	Kitt Peak	Spacewatch	·	1.5 km	MPC · JPL
331894	2004 LZ	—	June 8, 2004	Goodricke-Pigott	R. A. Tucker	·	1.8 km	MPC · JPL
331895	2004 NW	—	July 7, 2004	Campo Imperatore	CINEOS	·	1.8 km	MPC · JPL
331896	2004 NM_{24}	—	July 14, 2004	Siding Spring	SSS	EUN	1.7 km	MPC · JPL
331897	2004 PD_{38}	—	August 9, 2004	Socorro	LINEAR	EUN	1.6 km	MPC · JPL
331898	2004 PP_{42}	—	August 9, 2004	Socorro	LINEAR	·	1.7 km	MPC · JPL
331899	2004 PP_{51}	—	August 8, 2004	Socorro	LINEAR	ADE	2.2 km	MPC · JPL
331900	2004 PS_{58}	—	August 9, 2004	Socorro	LINEAR	·	1.3 km	MPC · JPL

== 331901–332000 ==
back to top

Designation			Discovery			Properties		Ref
Permanent	Provisional	Named after	Date	Site	Discoverer(s)	Category	Diam.	Ref
331901	2004 PF_{60}	—	August 9, 2004	Socorro	LINEAR	·	2.7 km	MPC · JPL
331902	2004 PV_{86}	—	August 11, 2004	Socorro	LINEAR	(5)	1.5 km	MPC · JPL
331903	2004 PA_{114}	—	August 9, 2004	Socorro	LINEAR	EUN	1.8 km	MPC · JPL
331904	2004 RZ_{1}	—	September 6, 2004	Socorro	LINEAR	H	650 m	MPC · JPL
331905	2004 RT_{7}	—	September 6, 2004	Palomar	NEAT	·	2.1 km	MPC · JPL
331906	2004 RR_{10}	—	September 7, 2004	Kleť	Kleť	·	1.8 km	MPC · JPL
331907	2004 RH_{18}	—	September 7, 2004	Socorro	LINEAR	·	1.4 km	MPC · JPL
331908	2004 RG_{33}	—	September 7, 2004	Socorro	LINEAR	(5)	1.7 km	MPC · JPL
331909	2004 RT_{53}	—	September 8, 2004	Socorro	LINEAR	·	1.8 km	MPC · JPL
331910	2004 RL_{58}	—	September 8, 2004	Socorro	LINEAR	·	2.3 km	MPC · JPL
331911	2004 RS_{68}	—	September 8, 2004	Socorro	LINEAR	·	2.7 km	MPC · JPL
331912	2004 RY_{123}	—	September 7, 2004	Palomar	NEAT	·	2.2 km	MPC · JPL
331913	2004 RO_{159}	—	September 10, 2004	Socorro	LINEAR	·	2.7 km	MPC · JPL
331914	2004 RH_{167}	—	September 7, 2004	Socorro	LINEAR	·	1.8 km	MPC · JPL
331915	2004 RW_{168}	—	September 8, 2004	Socorro	LINEAR	·	2.3 km	MPC · JPL
331916	2004 RA_{170}	—	September 8, 2004	Palomar	NEAT	·	3.8 km	MPC · JPL
331917	2004 RU_{183}	—	August 26, 2004	Catalina	CSS	BAR	1.6 km	MPC · JPL
331918	2004 RV_{192}	—	September 10, 2004	Socorro	LINEAR	·	2.2 km	MPC · JPL
331919	2004 RU_{194}	—	September 10, 2004	Socorro	LINEAR	·	1.4 km	MPC · JPL
331920	2004 RH_{199}	—	September 10, 2004	Socorro	LINEAR	EUN	2.1 km	MPC · JPL
331921	2004 RQ_{201}	—	September 10, 2004	Kitt Peak	Spacewatch	·	3.2 km	MPC · JPL
331922	2004 RA_{214}	—	September 11, 2004	Socorro	LINEAR	EUN	1.4 km	MPC · JPL
331923	2004 RD_{240}	—	September 10, 2004	Kitt Peak	Spacewatch	·	2.0 km	MPC · JPL
331924	2004 RC_{272}	—	September 11, 2004	Kitt Peak	Spacewatch	·	1.3 km	MPC · JPL
331925	2004 RP_{309}	—	September 13, 2004	Socorro	LINEAR	RAF	970 m	MPC · JPL
331926	2004 RQ_{327}	—	September 14, 2004	Socorro	LINEAR	·	3.4 km	MPC · JPL
331927	2004 RU_{327}	—	September 14, 2004	Socorro	LINEAR	·	4.2 km	MPC · JPL
331928	2004 SH_{17}	—	September 17, 2004	Anderson Mesa	LONEOS	·	1.6 km	MPC · JPL
331929	2004 SE_{25}	—	September 21, 2004	Kitt Peak	Spacewatch	·	1.5 km	MPC · JPL
331930	2004 SN_{41}	—	September 17, 2004	Kitt Peak	Spacewatch	·	2.5 km	MPC · JPL
331931	2004 SW_{41}	—	September 18, 2004	Socorro	LINEAR	·	2.2 km	MPC · JPL
331932	2004 SW_{51}	—	September 17, 2004	Socorro	LINEAR	·	2.1 km	MPC · JPL
331933	2004 TV_{14}	—	October 8, 2004	Socorro	LINEAR	H	690 m	MPC · JPL
331934	2004 TN_{25}	—	October 4, 2004	Kitt Peak	Spacewatch	EUN	1.6 km	MPC · JPL
331935	2004 TJ_{34}	—	October 4, 2004	Kitt Peak	Spacewatch	(17392)	1.6 km	MPC · JPL
331936	2004 TY_{37}	—	October 4, 2004	Kitt Peak	Spacewatch	·	2.2 km	MPC · JPL
331937	2004 TD_{42}	—	October 4, 2004	Kitt Peak	Spacewatch	·	3.4 km	MPC · JPL
331938	2004 TW_{52}	—	October 4, 2004	Kitt Peak	Spacewatch	JUN	1.1 km	MPC · JPL
331939	2004 TS_{66}	—	September 22, 2004	Socorro	LINEAR	·	3.2 km	MPC · JPL
331940	2004 TK_{119}	—	October 6, 2004	Socorro	LINEAR	·	1.6 km	MPC · JPL
331941	2004 TB_{123}	—	October 7, 2004	Anderson Mesa	LONEOS	·	1.5 km	MPC · JPL
331942	2004 TM_{164}	—	October 6, 2004	Kitt Peak	Spacewatch	·	2.7 km	MPC · JPL
331943	2004 TP_{166}	—	October 7, 2004	Kitt Peak	Spacewatch	HOF	2.6 km	MPC · JPL
331944	2004 TZ_{203}	—	October 7, 2004	Kitt Peak	Spacewatch	·	2.1 km	MPC · JPL
331945	2004 TQ_{230}	—	October 8, 2004	Kitt Peak	Spacewatch	KOR	1.3 km	MPC · JPL
331946	2004 TH_{243}	—	October 6, 2004	Palomar	NEAT	EUN	1.7 km	MPC · JPL
331947	2004 TS_{256}	—	October 9, 2004	Kitt Peak	Spacewatch	MRX	1.4 km	MPC · JPL
331948	2004 TB_{274}	—	October 9, 2004	Kitt Peak	Spacewatch	·	2.5 km	MPC · JPL
331949	2004 TN_{299}	—	October 8, 2004	Socorro	LINEAR	·	3.4 km	MPC · JPL
331950	2004 TH_{328}	—	October 4, 2004	Palomar	NEAT	·	2.7 km	MPC · JPL
331951	2004 TB_{343}	—	October 13, 2004	Kitt Peak	Spacewatch	·	3.4 km	MPC · JPL
331952	2004 TB_{356}	—	October 7, 2004	Socorro	LINEAR	·	3.0 km	MPC · JPL
331953	2004 TM_{369}	—	October 9, 2004	Kitt Peak	Spacewatch	·	2.7 km	MPC · JPL
331954	2004 UM_{3}	—	October 19, 2004	Socorro	LINEAR	GEF	1.8 km	MPC · JPL
331955	2004 VB_{5}	—	November 3, 2004	Anderson Mesa	LONEOS	EUN	1.7 km	MPC · JPL
331956	2004 VS_{10}	—	November 3, 2004	Catalina	CSS	TIR	3.8 km	MPC · JPL
331957	2004 VZ_{36}	—	November 4, 2004	Kitt Peak	Spacewatch	KOR	1.5 km	MPC · JPL
331958	2004 VD_{39}	—	November 4, 2004	Kitt Peak	Spacewatch	·	1.0 km	MPC · JPL
331959	2004 VG_{75}	—	November 13, 2004	Goodricke-Pigott	Goodricke-Pigott	·	2.8 km	MPC · JPL
331960	2004 VV_{84}	—	November 10, 2004	Kitt Peak	Spacewatch	·	3.5 km	MPC · JPL
331961	2004 XQ_{28}	—	December 10, 2004	Kitt Peak	Spacewatch	EOS	3.0 km	MPC · JPL
331962	2004 XA_{34}	—	December 11, 2004	Campo Imperatore	CINEOS	·	3.1 km	MPC · JPL
331963	2004 XK_{35}	—	December 11, 2004	Socorro	LINEAR	AMO +1km	1.0 km	MPC · JPL
331964	2004 XD_{37}	—	December 11, 2004	Kitt Peak	Spacewatch	TEL	1.8 km	MPC · JPL
331965	2004 XK_{41}	—	December 11, 2004	Junk Bond	Junk Bond	·	3.5 km	MPC · JPL
331966	2004 XA_{57}	—	December 10, 2004	Kitt Peak	Spacewatch	·	2.4 km	MPC · JPL
331967	2004 XM_{70}	—	December 11, 2004	Catalina	CSS	BRA	1.8 km	MPC · JPL
331968	2004 XY_{82}	—	December 11, 2004	Kitt Peak	Spacewatch	·	2.4 km	MPC · JPL
331969	2004 XS_{118}	—	December 12, 2004	Kitt Peak	Spacewatch	GEF	1.6 km	MPC · JPL
331970	2004 YU_{7}	—	December 18, 2004	Mount Lemmon	Mount Lemmon Survey	·	1.6 km	MPC · JPL
331971	2005 AR_{63}	—	January 13, 2005	Kitt Peak	Spacewatch	·	3.6 km	MPC · JPL
331972	2005 AH_{66}	—	January 13, 2005	Kitt Peak	Spacewatch	·	2.5 km	MPC · JPL
331973	2005 AG_{77}	—	January 15, 2005	Kitt Peak	Spacewatch	·	3.3 km	MPC · JPL
331974	2005 CP_{28}	—	February 1, 2005	Kitt Peak	Spacewatch	·	2.7 km	MPC · JPL
331975	2005 CT_{39}	—	February 1, 2005	Kitt Peak	Spacewatch	·	4.0 km	MPC · JPL
331976	2005 CU_{64}	—	February 2, 2005	Kitt Peak	Spacewatch	·	760 m	MPC · JPL
331977	2005 CO_{78}	—	February 14, 2005	Catalina	CSS	·	4.0 km	MPC · JPL
331978	2005 CZ_{80}	—	February 9, 2005	Anderson Mesa	LONEOS	LUT	5.9 km	MPC · JPL
331979	2005 CB_{81}	—	February 10, 2005	Campo Imperatore	CINEOS	·	3.7 km	MPC · JPL
331980	2005 EK_{9}	—	March 2, 2005	Kitt Peak	Spacewatch	EOS	3.1 km	MPC · JPL
331981	2005 EG_{19}	—	March 3, 2005	Kitt Peak	Spacewatch	·	800 m	MPC · JPL
331982	2005 EJ_{38}	—	March 2, 2005	Socorro	LINEAR	·	6.1 km	MPC · JPL
331983	2005 EA_{42}	—	March 2, 2005	Kitt Peak	Spacewatch	·	2.5 km	MPC · JPL
331984	2005 EM_{76}	—	March 3, 2005	Kitt Peak	Spacewatch	·	860 m	MPC · JPL
331985	2005 EH_{152}	—	March 10, 2005	Kitt Peak	Spacewatch	·	830 m	MPC · JPL
331986	2005 EA_{210}	—	March 4, 2005	Kitt Peak	Spacewatch	·	4.0 km	MPC · JPL
331987	2005 EF_{244}	—	March 11, 2005	Mount Lemmon	Mount Lemmon Survey	·	630 m	MPC · JPL
331988	2005 EC_{262}	—	March 13, 2005	Mount Lemmon	Mount Lemmon Survey	·	2.7 km	MPC · JPL
331989	2005 EC_{292}	—	March 10, 2005	Catalina	CSS	·	1.0 km	MPC · JPL
331990	2005 FD	—	March 16, 2005	Catalina	CSS	APO	400 m	MPC · JPL
331991	2005 FD_{3}	—	March 21, 2005	Socorro	LINEAR	·	3.6 km	MPC · JPL
331992 Chasseral	2005 GU_{9}	Chasseral	April 3, 2005	Vicques	M. Ory	·	790 m	MPC · JPL
331993	2005 GY_{21}	—	April 4, 2005	Catalina	CSS	·	1.2 km	MPC · JPL
331994	2005 GB_{50}	—	April 5, 2005	Mount Lemmon	Mount Lemmon Survey	AST	1.7 km	MPC · JPL
331995	2005 GU_{144}	—	April 10, 2005	Siding Spring	SSS	·	1.1 km	MPC · JPL
331996	2005 GJ_{173}	—	April 14, 2005	Kitt Peak	Spacewatch	·	3.2 km	MPC · JPL
331997	2005 GZ_{174}	—	April 14, 2005	Kitt Peak	Spacewatch	·	630 m	MPC · JPL
331998	2005 GA_{217}	—	April 2, 2005	Kitt Peak	Spacewatch	·	3.3 km	MPC · JPL
331999	2005 HA_{8}	—	May 3, 2005	Kitt Peak	Kitt Peak	AMO	490 m	MPC · JPL
332000	2005 JK_{69}	—	May 6, 2005	Kitt Peak	Spacewatch	CYB	5.1 km	MPC · JPL

back to top

== See also ==
- Meanings of minor-planet names: 331001–332000
