= Meanings of minor-planet names: 331001–332000 =

As minor planet discoveries are confirmed, they are given a permanent number by the IAU's Minor Planet Center (MPC), and the discoverers can then submit names for them, following the IAU's naming conventions. The list below concerns those minor planets in the specified number-range that have received names, and explains the meanings of those names.

Official naming citations of newly named small Solar System bodies are approved and published in a bulletin by IAU's Working Group for Small Bodies Nomenclature (WGSBN). Before May 2021, citations were published in MPC's Minor Planet Circulars for many decades. Recent citations can also be found on the JPL Small-Body Database (SBDB). Until his death in 2016, German astronomer Lutz D. Schmadel compiled these citations into the Dictionary of Minor Planet Names (DMP) and regularly updated the collection.

Based on Paul Herget's The Names of the Minor Planets, Schmadel also researched the unclear origin of numerous asteroids, most of which had been named prior to World War II. This article incorporates text from this source, which is in the public domain: SBDB New namings may only be added to this list below after official publication as the preannouncement of names is condemned. The WGSBN publishes a comprehensive guideline for the naming rules of non-cometary small Solar System bodies.

== 331001–331100 ==
Named minor planet	Provisional	This minor planet was named for...	Ref · Catalog
331011 Peccioli	2009 UF_{94}	Peccioli, Italy, a village located in Alta Valdera in the Italian district of Pisa	JPL · 331011

== 331101–331200 ==
back to top

Named minor planet	Provisional	This minor planet was named for...	Ref · Catalog
331105 Giselher	2009 XG_{9}	Dietrich Giselher Kracht (born 1944) is the elder brother of the discoverer, who introduced him to astronomy at the observatory of the Olbers-Gesellschaft in Bremen.	JPL · 331105

== 331201–331300 ==
back to top

Named minor planet	Provisional	This minor planet was named for...	Ref · Catalog
331298 Eunicefoote	2011 EN_{19}	Eunice Newton Foote, American scientist and women’s rights advocate.	IAU · 331298

== 331301–331400 ==
back to top

Named minor planet	Provisional	This minor planet was named for...	Ref · Catalog
331316 Cavedon	2011 GP_{36}	Mario Cavedon (1920–2009) was an Italian astronomer, mathematician, and science writer at the Brera Astronomical Observatory who studied the celestial mechanics of small Solar System bodies and the perturbation of their orbits.	IAU · 331316
331341 Frankscholten	2012 BL_{102}	Frank Scholten (b. 1961) was a specialist in planetary photogrammetry active at the DLR Planetary Geodesy Department from 1999 to 2021. Among other space missions, he was involved in Mars-Express, Venus-Express, Dawn, Rosetta and Hayabusa 2.	IAU · 331341
331371 Jockers	2012 DR_{53}	Klaus Jockers (b. 1940), a German astrophysicist	IAU · 331371

== 331401–331500 ==
back to top

Named minor planet	Provisional	This minor planet was named for...	Ref · Catalog
There are no named minor planets in this number range

== 331501–331600 ==
back to top

Named minor planet	Provisional	This minor planet was named for...	Ref · Catalog
There are no named minor planets in this number range

== 331601–331700 ==
back to top

Named minor planet	Provisional	This minor planet was named for...	Ref · Catalog
331605 Guidogryseels	2001 XB_{5}	Guido Gryseels (b. 1952), a Belgian agricultural economist.	IAU · 331605

== 331701–331800 ==
back to top

Named minor planet	Provisional	This minor planet was named for...	Ref · Catalog
331785 Sumners	2003 HL_{15}	Carolyn Sumners (born 1948) has taught astronomy at the Houston Museum of Natural Science's Burke Baker Planetarium since 1972. It was her inspiration to move a meter-class telescope to the George Observatory in 1989 for educating the public under the stars.	JPL · 331785

== 331801–331900 ==
back to top

Named minor planet	Provisional	This minor planet was named for...	Ref · Catalog
There are no named minor planets in this number range

== 331901–332000 ==
back to top

Named minor planet	Provisional	This minor planet was named for...	Ref · Catalog
331992 Chasseral	2005 GU_{9}	The Chasseral is a mountain of the Jura range, overlooking Lake Biel in the Swiss canton of Bern.	JPL · 331992

back to top

Preceded by 330,001–331,000	Meanings of minor-planet names List of minor planets: 331,001–332,000	Succeeded by 332,001–333,000
