= List of minor planets: 336001–337000 =

The following is a partial list of minor planets, running from minor-planet number 336001 through 337000, inclusive. The primary data for this and other partial lists is based on JPL's "Small-Body Orbital Elements" and data available from the Minor Planet Center. Critical list information is also provided by the MPC, unless otherwise specified from Lowell Observatory. A detailed description of the table's columns and additional sources are given on the main page including a complete list of every page in this series, and a statistical break-up on the dynamical classification of minor planets.

Also see the summary list of all named bodies in numerical and alphabetical order, and the corresponding naming citations for the number range of this particular list. New namings may only be added to this list after official publication, as the preannouncement of names is condemned by the Working Group for Small Bodies Nomenclature of the International Astronomical Union.

| Near-Earth obj. | MBA (inner) | MBA (outer) | Centaur |
| Mars-crosser | MBA (middle) | Jupiter trojan | Trans-Neptunian obj. |
| Unclassified |

== 336001–336100 ==
| Designation | | | Discovery | | | Properties | | Ref |
| Permanent | Provisional | Named after | Date | Site | Discoverer(s) | Category | Diam. | Ref |
|---|---|---|---|---|---|---|---|---|
| 336001 | 2007 TL_{366} | — | October 9, 2007 | Kitt Peak | Spacewatch | · | 3.3 km | MPC · JPL |
| 336002 | 2007 TZ_{368} | — | October 11, 2007 | Catalina | CSS | · | 3.1 km | MPC · JPL |
| 336003 | 2007 TV_{374} | — | October 15, 2007 | Mount Lemmon | Mount Lemmon Survey | · | 3.7 km | MPC · JPL |
| 336004 | 2007 TZ_{376} | — | October 11, 2007 | Catalina | CSS | HYG | 3.2 km | MPC · JPL |
| 336005 | 2007 TM_{379} | — | October 13, 2007 | Catalina | CSS | · | 4.7 km | MPC · JPL |
| 336006 | 2007 TU_{385} | — | October 15, 2007 | Catalina | CSS | · | 3.5 km | MPC · JPL |
| 336007 | 2007 TD_{386} | — | October 15, 2007 | Catalina | CSS | · | 4.2 km | MPC · JPL |
| 336008 | 2007 TF_{393} | — | October 13, 2007 | Kitt Peak | Spacewatch | KOR | 1.5 km | MPC · JPL |
| 336009 | 2007 TL_{397} | — | October 15, 2007 | Catalina | CSS | · | 4.2 km | MPC · JPL |
| 336010 | 2007 TG_{404} | — | October 15, 2007 | Kitt Peak | Spacewatch | · | 4.4 km | MPC · JPL |
| 336011 | 2007 TN_{407} | — | October 15, 2007 | Mount Lemmon | Mount Lemmon Survey | VER | 3.0 km | MPC · JPL |
| 336012 | 2007 TP_{421} | — | October 12, 2007 | Catalina | CSS | · | 3.1 km | MPC · JPL |
| 336013 | 2007 TR_{424} | — | October 8, 2007 | Catalina | CSS | · | 2.8 km | MPC · JPL |
| 336014 | 2007 TX_{440} | — | October 8, 2007 | Catalina | CSS | · | 3.3 km | MPC · JPL |
| 336015 | 2007 TW_{442} | — | October 10, 2007 | Catalina | CSS | · | 3.6 km | MPC · JPL |
| 336016 | 2007 TQ_{445} | — | October 6, 2007 | Kitt Peak | Spacewatch | H | 480 m | MPC · JPL |
| 336017 | 2007 TJ_{446} | — | October 9, 2007 | Socorro | LINEAR | · | 3.0 km | MPC · JPL |
| 336018 | 2007 UZ_{5} | — | October 11, 2007 | Catalina | CSS | · | 4.1 km | MPC · JPL |
| 336019 | 2007 UH_{8} | — | October 16, 2007 | Catalina | CSS | · | 4.9 km | MPC · JPL |
| 336020 | 2007 UQ_{17} | — | January 30, 2004 | Kitt Peak | Spacewatch | · | 3.2 km | MPC · JPL |
| 336021 | 2007 UW_{30} | — | October 19, 2007 | Catalina | CSS | HYG | 3.4 km | MPC · JPL |
| 336022 | 2007 UC_{31} | — | October 19, 2007 | Catalina | CSS | · | 3.3 km | MPC · JPL |
| 336023 | 2007 UU_{35} | — | October 19, 2007 | Catalina | CSS | HYG | 2.9 km | MPC · JPL |
| 336024 | 2007 UU_{46} | — | October 20, 2007 | Catalina | CSS | · | 3.7 km | MPC · JPL |
| 336025 | 2007 UX_{54} | — | October 30, 2007 | Kitt Peak | Spacewatch | THM | 2.6 km | MPC · JPL |
| 336026 | 2007 UX_{65} | — | October 31, 2007 | Catalina | CSS | · | 3.6 km | MPC · JPL |
| 336027 | 2007 UT_{116} | — | October 8, 2007 | Anderson Mesa | LONEOS | TIR | 4.0 km | MPC · JPL |
| 336028 | 2007 UR_{118} | — | October 31, 2007 | Catalina | CSS | · | 2.9 km | MPC · JPL |
| 336029 | 2007 UB_{140} | — | October 16, 2007 | Catalina | CSS | · | 5.9 km | MPC · JPL |
| 336030 | 2007 VH_{7} | — | November 1, 2007 | Lulin | LUSS | · | 4.7 km | MPC · JPL |
| 336031 | 2007 VU_{10} | — | November 6, 2007 | Mayhill | Lowe, A. | · | 3.7 km | MPC · JPL |
| 336032 | 2007 VY_{15} | — | November 1, 2007 | Kitt Peak | Spacewatch | HYG | 2.8 km | MPC · JPL |
| 336033 | 2007 VQ_{117} | — | November 4, 2007 | Kitt Peak | Spacewatch | · | 3.5 km | MPC · JPL |
| 336034 | 2007 VN_{122} | — | November 5, 2007 | Kitt Peak | Spacewatch | · | 2.7 km | MPC · JPL |
| 336035 | 2007 VA_{135} | — | November 3, 2007 | Kitt Peak | Spacewatch | EOS | 2.3 km | MPC · JPL |
| 336036 | 2007 VG_{150} | — | November 7, 2007 | Mount Lemmon | Mount Lemmon Survey | · | 3.2 km | MPC · JPL |
| 336037 | 2007 VM_{234} | — | November 9, 2007 | Kitt Peak | Spacewatch | · | 2.1 km | MPC · JPL |
| 336038 | 2007 VZ_{261} | — | October 18, 2007 | Kitt Peak | Spacewatch | · | 3.0 km | MPC · JPL |
| 336039 | 2007 VN_{287} | — | November 12, 2007 | Catalina | CSS | · | 4.9 km | MPC · JPL |
| 336040 | 2007 VS_{298} | — | November 11, 2007 | Catalina | CSS | TIR | 3.1 km | MPC · JPL |
| 336041 | 2007 VW_{299} | — | November 12, 2007 | Catalina | CSS | · | 5.7 km | MPC · JPL |
| 336042 | 2007 VC_{321} | — | November 7, 2007 | Catalina | CSS | · | 3.3 km | MPC · JPL |
| 336043 | 2007 WZ | — | November 16, 2007 | Dauban | Chante-Perdrix | · | 3.5 km | MPC · JPL |
| 336044 | 2007 WB_{3} | — | November 16, 2007 | Mount Lemmon | Mount Lemmon Survey | EOS | 2.3 km | MPC · JPL |
| 336045 | 2007 YN_{60} | — | December 30, 2007 | Catalina | CSS | H | 720 m | MPC · JPL |
| 336046 | 2008 AS_{54} | — | January 11, 2008 | Kitt Peak | Spacewatch | · | 1.3 km | MPC · JPL |
| 336047 | 2008 AO_{136} | — | January 13, 2008 | Catalina | CSS | H | 670 m | MPC · JPL |
| 336048 | 2008 CK_{4} | — | February 2, 2008 | Mount Lemmon | Mount Lemmon Survey | · | 830 m | MPC · JPL |
| 336049 | 2008 CW_{36} | — | February 2, 2008 | Kitt Peak | Spacewatch | · | 640 m | MPC · JPL |
| 336050 | 2008 CZ_{61} | — | January 30, 2008 | Mount Lemmon | Mount Lemmon Survey | · | 1.1 km | MPC · JPL |
| 336051 | 2008 CH_{143} | — | February 8, 2008 | Kitt Peak | Spacewatch | · | 900 m | MPC · JPL |
| 336052 | 2008 CC_{145} | — | February 9, 2008 | Kitt Peak | Spacewatch | · | 680 m | MPC · JPL |
| 336053 | 2008 CU_{199} | — | February 13, 2008 | Mount Lemmon | Mount Lemmon Survey | · | 1.1 km | MPC · JPL |
| 336054 | 2008 CX_{211} | — | April 4, 2005 | Catalina | CSS | · | 1.0 km | MPC · JPL |
| 336055 | 2008 DV_{8} | — | February 25, 2008 | Mount Lemmon | Mount Lemmon Survey | · | 840 m | MPC · JPL |
| 336056 | 2008 DE_{67} | — | February 29, 2008 | Kitt Peak | Spacewatch | · | 750 m | MPC · JPL |
| 336057 | 2008 EN_{19} | — | March 2, 2008 | Kitt Peak | Spacewatch | · | 840 m | MPC · JPL |
| 336058 | 2008 EU_{36} | — | March 3, 2008 | XuYi | PMO NEO Survey Program | · | 740 m | MPC · JPL |
| 336059 | 2008 EF_{95} | — | March 5, 2008 | Mount Lemmon | Mount Lemmon Survey | (2076) | 850 m | MPC · JPL |
| 336060 | 2008 EE_{109} | — | March 7, 2008 | Catalina | CSS | (2076) | 960 m | MPC · JPL |
| 336061 | 2008 EN_{113} | — | March 8, 2008 | Mount Lemmon | Mount Lemmon Survey | · | 900 m | MPC · JPL |
| 336062 | 2008 EL_{117} | — | March 8, 2008 | Kitt Peak | Spacewatch | · | 810 m | MPC · JPL |
| 336063 | 2008 EB_{122} | — | March 9, 2008 | Kitt Peak | Spacewatch | · | 730 m | MPC · JPL |
| 336064 | 2008 EF_{137} | — | March 11, 2008 | Kitt Peak | Spacewatch | · | 720 m | MPC · JPL |
| 336065 | 2008 EX_{147} | — | March 1, 2008 | Kitt Peak | Spacewatch | · | 750 m | MPC · JPL |
| 336066 | 2008 FR_{7} | — | March 25, 2008 | Kitt Peak | Spacewatch | · | 620 m | MPC · JPL |
| 336067 | 2008 FZ_{15} | — | March 26, 2008 | Kitt Peak | Spacewatch | · | 1.0 km | MPC · JPL |
| 336068 | 2008 FB_{27} | — | March 27, 2008 | Kitt Peak | Spacewatch | L5 | 10 km | MPC · JPL |
| 336069 | 2008 FQ_{45} | — | March 28, 2008 | Mount Lemmon | Mount Lemmon Survey | · | 660 m | MPC · JPL |
| 336070 | 2008 FV_{58} | — | March 29, 2008 | Kitt Peak | Spacewatch | · | 730 m | MPC · JPL |
| 336071 | 2008 FR_{67} | — | March 28, 2008 | Mount Lemmon | Mount Lemmon Survey | MAS | 740 m | MPC · JPL |
| 336072 | 2008 FG_{69} | — | March 28, 2008 | Mount Lemmon | Mount Lemmon Survey | · | 950 m | MPC · JPL |
| 336073 | 2008 FG_{70} | — | March 28, 2008 | Kitt Peak | Spacewatch | · | 750 m | MPC · JPL |
| 336074 | 2008 FU_{73} | — | September 26, 2001 | Eskridge | G. Hug | L5 | 10 km | MPC · JPL |
| 336075 | 2008 FU_{91} | — | March 29, 2008 | Mount Lemmon | Mount Lemmon Survey | · | 750 m | MPC · JPL |
| 336076 | 2008 FY_{100} | — | March 30, 2008 | Kitt Peak | Spacewatch | · | 1.0 km | MPC · JPL |
| 336077 | 2008 FK_{105} | — | March 31, 2008 | Kitt Peak | Spacewatch | · | 750 m | MPC · JPL |
| 336078 | 2008 FU_{111} | — | March 31, 2008 | Kitt Peak | Spacewatch | (2076) | 890 m | MPC · JPL |
| 336079 | 2008 GA_{1} | — | April 2, 2008 | La Sagra | OAM | · | 860 m | MPC · JPL |
| 336080 | 2008 GO_{10} | — | April 1, 2008 | Kitt Peak | Spacewatch | · | 880 m | MPC · JPL |
| 336081 | 2008 GR_{13} | — | April 3, 2008 | Mount Lemmon | Mount Lemmon Survey | · | 660 m | MPC · JPL |
| 336082 | 2008 GK_{31} | — | April 3, 2008 | Kitt Peak | Spacewatch | · | 870 m | MPC · JPL |
| 336083 | 2008 GA_{33} | — | April 3, 2008 | Kitt Peak | Spacewatch | · | 820 m | MPC · JPL |
| 336084 | 2008 GS_{62} | — | April 5, 2008 | Catalina | CSS | · | 1 km | MPC · JPL |
| 336085 | 2008 GF_{63} | — | April 5, 2008 | Kitt Peak | Spacewatch | · | 1.1 km | MPC · JPL |
| 336086 | 2008 GF_{74} | — | April 7, 2008 | Kitt Peak | Spacewatch | · | 870 m | MPC · JPL |
| 336087 | 2008 GW_{90} | — | April 6, 2008 | Mount Lemmon | Mount Lemmon Survey | (1338) (FLO) | 690 m | MPC · JPL |
| 336088 | 2008 GB_{99} | — | April 9, 2008 | Kitt Peak | Spacewatch | · | 710 m | MPC · JPL |
| 336089 | 2008 GO_{107} | — | April 12, 2008 | Catalina | CSS | · | 1.0 km | MPC · JPL |
| 336090 | 2008 GL_{109} | — | April 13, 2008 | Mount Lemmon | Mount Lemmon Survey | · | 1.1 km | MPC · JPL |
| 336091 | 2008 GR_{119} | — | April 11, 2008 | Kitt Peak | Spacewatch | · | 870 m | MPC · JPL |
| 336092 | 2008 GU_{121} | — | April 13, 2008 | Kitt Peak | Spacewatch | · | 730 m | MPC · JPL |
| 336093 | 2008 GK_{144} | — | April 3, 2008 | Kitt Peak | Spacewatch | NYS | 1.2 km | MPC · JPL |
| 336094 | 2008 HN_{3} | — | April 24, 2008 | Andrushivka | Andrushivka | V | 750 m | MPC · JPL |
| 336095 | 2008 HA_{4} | — | April 26, 2008 | Dauban | Kugel, F. | · | 770 m | MPC · JPL |
| 336096 | 2008 HQ_{5} | — | April 24, 2008 | Kitt Peak | Spacewatch | NYS | 1.1 km | MPC · JPL |
| 336097 | 2008 HQ_{15} | — | April 25, 2008 | Kitt Peak | Spacewatch | · | 1.2 km | MPC · JPL |
| 336098 | 2008 HB_{34} | — | April 27, 2008 | Kitt Peak | Spacewatch | · | 1.3 km | MPC · JPL |
| 336099 | 2008 HE_{34} | — | April 27, 2008 | Kitt Peak | Spacewatch | · | 1.0 km | MPC · JPL |
| 336100 | 2008 HL_{44} | — | April 27, 2008 | Mount Lemmon | Mount Lemmon Survey | NYS | 1.0 km | MPC · JPL |

== 336101–336200 ==
back to top

| Designation | | | Discovery | | | Properties | | Ref |
| Permanent | Provisional | Named after | Date | Site | Discoverer(s) | Category | Diam. | Ref |
|---|---|---|---|---|---|---|---|---|
| 336101 | 2008 HL_{55} | — | April 29, 2008 | Kitt Peak | Spacewatch | · | 930 m | MPC · JPL |
| 336102 | 2008 HB_{59} | — | April 30, 2008 | Mount Lemmon | Mount Lemmon Survey | · | 790 m | MPC · JPL |
| 336103 | 2008 HU_{61} | — | April 30, 2008 | Mount Lemmon | Mount Lemmon Survey | · | 980 m | MPC · JPL |
| 336104 | 2008 HF_{66} | — | April 24, 2008 | Mount Lemmon | Mount Lemmon Survey | · | 950 m | MPC · JPL |
| 336105 | 2008 HN_{67} | — | April 29, 2008 | Kitt Peak | Spacewatch | MAS | 710 m | MPC · JPL |
| 336106 | 2008 HE_{70} | — | April 26, 2008 | Kitt Peak | Spacewatch | · | 1.4 km | MPC · JPL |
| 336107 | 2008 JD_{7} | — | May 2, 2008 | Kitt Peak | Spacewatch | · | 1.3 km | MPC · JPL |
| 336108 Luberon | 2008 JD_{8} | Luberon | May 2, 2008 | Vicques | M. Ory | MAS | 760 m | MPC · JPL |
| 336109 Rokiškis | 2008 JN_{8} | Rokiškis | May 2, 2008 | Moletai | K. Černis, J. Zdanavičius | · | 1.4 km | MPC · JPL |
| 336110 | 2008 JY_{20} | — | May 9, 2008 | Grove Creek | Tozzi, F. | · | 1.6 km | MPC · JPL |
| 336111 | 2008 JK_{34} | — | May 15, 2008 | Kitt Peak | Spacewatch | · | 1.4 km | MPC · JPL |
| 336112 | 2008 JL_{35} | — | May 9, 2008 | Siding Spring | SSS | PHO | 1.6 km | MPC · JPL |
| 336113 | 2008 JC_{38} | — | May 3, 2008 | Mount Lemmon | Mount Lemmon Survey | MAS | 860 m | MPC · JPL |
| 336114 | 2008 KO_{1} | — | May 26, 2008 | Kitt Peak | Spacewatch | V | 640 m | MPC · JPL |
| 336115 | 2008 KZ_{3} | — | May 27, 2008 | Mount Lemmon | Mount Lemmon Survey | V | 660 m | MPC · JPL |
| 336116 | 2008 KB_{9} | — | April 28, 2001 | Kitt Peak | Spacewatch | · | 700 m | MPC · JPL |
| 336117 | 2008 LK_{15} | — | June 9, 2008 | Kitt Peak | Spacewatch | · | 750 m | MPC · JPL |
| 336118 | 2008 LT_{17} | — | March 29, 2008 | Kitt Peak | Spacewatch | L5 | 9.0 km | MPC · JPL |
| 336119 | 2008 NY_{1} | — | July 7, 2008 | La Sagra | OAM | · | 1.9 km | MPC · JPL |
| 336120 | 2008 NY_{4} | — | July 14, 2008 | Charleston | Astronomical Research Observatory | · | 1.4 km | MPC · JPL |
| 336121 | 2008 OS_{3} | — | July 25, 2008 | Siding Spring | SSS | · | 2.3 km | MPC · JPL |
| 336122 | 2008 OA_{8} | — | July 29, 2008 | La Sagra | OAM | NYS | 1.6 km | MPC · JPL |
| 336123 | 2008 OK_{10} | — | July 31, 2008 | Dauban | Kugel, F. | · | 1.7 km | MPC · JPL |
| 336124 | 2008 OQ_{18} | — | July 29, 2008 | La Sagra | OAM | NYS | 1.2 km | MPC · JPL |
| 336125 | 2008 OL_{19} | — | July 26, 2008 | Siding Spring | SSS | · | 1.3 km | MPC · JPL |
| 336126 | 2008 OB_{24} | — | July 29, 2008 | Kitt Peak | Spacewatch | · | 1.2 km | MPC · JPL |
| 336127 | 2008 OE_{25} | — | July 29, 2008 | Mount Lemmon | Mount Lemmon Survey | · | 2.2 km | MPC · JPL |
| 336128 | 2008 PU_{4} | — | August 5, 2008 | Hibiscus | S. F. Hönig, Teamo, N. | · | 1.4 km | MPC · JPL |
| 336129 | 2008 PD_{8} | — | August 5, 2008 | La Sagra | OAM | · | 1.4 km | MPC · JPL |
| 336130 | 2008 PL_{8} | — | August 6, 2008 | La Sagra | OAM | · | 3.0 km | MPC · JPL |
| 336131 | 2008 PH_{11} | — | August 7, 2008 | Reedy Creek | J. Broughton | fast | 1.3 km | MPC · JPL |
| 336132 | 2008 PC_{14} | — | December 1, 2005 | Mount Lemmon | Mount Lemmon Survey | · | 1.6 km | MPC · JPL |
| 336133 | 2008 PT_{18} | — | August 5, 2008 | Siding Spring | SSS | · | 1.8 km | MPC · JPL |
| 336134 | 2008 PW_{20} | — | August 2, 2008 | Siding Spring | SSS | · | 1.8 km | MPC · JPL |
| 336135 | 2008 QV_{1} | — | August 24, 2008 | La Sagra | OAM | EUN | 1.4 km | MPC · JPL |
| 336136 | 2008 QR_{6} | — | July 29, 2008 | Kitt Peak | Spacewatch | (5) | 1.3 km | MPC · JPL |
| 336137 | 2008 QY_{7} | — | August 25, 2008 | La Sagra | OAM | · | 1.2 km | MPC · JPL |
| 336138 | 2008 QP_{9} | — | August 25, 2008 | La Sagra | OAM | · | 1.5 km | MPC · JPL |
| 336139 | 2008 QW_{12} | — | August 26, 2008 | La Sagra | OAM | · | 1.4 km | MPC · JPL |
| 336140 | 2008 QR_{13} | — | August 27, 2008 | Prairie Grass | Mahony, J. | · | 1.0 km | MPC · JPL |
| 336141 | 2008 QM_{17} | — | August 27, 2008 | La Sagra | OAM | · | 2.6 km | MPC · JPL |
| 336142 | 2008 QY_{18} | — | August 29, 2008 | Dauban | Kugel, F. | EUN | 1.6 km | MPC · JPL |
| 336143 | 2008 QK_{22} | — | August 26, 2008 | Socorro | LINEAR | EUN | 1.3 km | MPC · JPL |
| 336144 | 2008 QG_{23} | — | August 26, 2008 | Socorro | LINEAR | · | 3.2 km | MPC · JPL |
| 336145 | 2008 QA_{27} | — | August 30, 2008 | La Sagra | OAM | · | 1.6 km | MPC · JPL |
| 336146 | 2008 QT_{31} | — | August 30, 2008 | Socorro | LINEAR | JUN | 1.3 km | MPC · JPL |
| 336147 | 2008 QP_{37} | — | August 21, 2008 | Kitt Peak | Spacewatch | · | 2.0 km | MPC · JPL |
| 336148 | 2008 QP_{38} | — | August 24, 2008 | Kitt Peak | Spacewatch | · | 1.8 km | MPC · JPL |
| 336149 | 2008 QA_{40} | — | August 26, 2008 | La Sagra | OAM | · | 990 m | MPC · JPL |
| 336150 | 2008 QF_{44} | — | August 23, 2008 | Kitt Peak | Spacewatch | · | 2.1 km | MPC · JPL |
| 336151 | 2008 QH_{45} | — | August 26, 2008 | Socorro | LINEAR | RAF | 900 m | MPC · JPL |
| 336152 | 2008 QQ_{45} | — | August 21, 2008 | Kitt Peak | Spacewatch | KON | 3.3 km | MPC · JPL |
| 336153 | 2008 RH | — | September 1, 2008 | Hibiscus | S. F. Hönig, Teamo, N. | · | 1.4 km | MPC · JPL |
| 336154 | 2008 RL_{1} | — | September 3, 2008 | Pla D'Arguines | R. Ferrando | EUN | 1.3 km | MPC · JPL |
| 336155 | 2008 RO_{1} | — | September 4, 2008 | Calvin-Rehoboth | L. A. Molnar | NYS | 1.2 km | MPC · JPL |
| 336156 | 2008 RU_{4} | — | September 2, 2008 | Kitt Peak | Spacewatch | · | 1.6 km | MPC · JPL |
| 336157 | 2008 RN_{8} | — | September 3, 2008 | Kitt Peak | Spacewatch | · | 1.5 km | MPC · JPL |
| 336158 | 2008 RW_{9} | — | September 3, 2008 | Kitt Peak | Spacewatch | · | 2.6 km | MPC · JPL |
| 336159 | 2008 RL_{13} | — | September 4, 2008 | Kitt Peak | Spacewatch | · | 1.9 km | MPC · JPL |
| 336160 | 2008 RW_{14} | — | September 4, 2008 | Kitt Peak | Spacewatch | EUN | 1.0 km | MPC · JPL |
| 336161 | 2008 RH_{16} | — | August 24, 2008 | Kitt Peak | Spacewatch | · | 1.6 km | MPC · JPL |
| 336162 | 2008 RV_{21} | — | September 2, 2008 | La Sagra | OAM | · | 2.0 km | MPC · JPL |
| 336163 | 2008 RN_{22} | — | September 3, 2008 | La Sagra | OAM | · | 1.6 km | MPC · JPL |
| 336164 | 2008 RE_{23} | — | September 4, 2008 | Socorro | LINEAR | · | 2.0 km | MPC · JPL |
| 336165 | 2008 RG_{24} | — | September 5, 2008 | Socorro | LINEAR | · | 1.9 km | MPC · JPL |
| 336166 | 2008 RH_{27} | — | September 8, 2008 | Dauban | Kugel, F. | BRG | 1.5 km | MPC · JPL |
| 336167 | 2008 RR_{30} | — | September 2, 2008 | Kitt Peak | Spacewatch | · | 2.1 km | MPC · JPL |
| 336168 | 2008 RM_{31} | — | September 2, 2008 | Kitt Peak | Spacewatch | · | 2.1 km | MPC · JPL |
| 336169 | 2008 RJ_{33} | — | September 2, 2008 | Kitt Peak | Spacewatch | · | 1.1 km | MPC · JPL |
| 336170 | 2008 RL_{34} | — | September 2, 2008 | Kitt Peak | Spacewatch | EUN | 1.4 km | MPC · JPL |
| 336171 | 2008 RO_{39} | — | September 2, 2008 | Kitt Peak | Spacewatch | ADE | 2.3 km | MPC · JPL |
| 336172 | 2008 RP_{42} | — | September 2, 2008 | Kitt Peak | Spacewatch | · | 1.6 km | MPC · JPL |
| 336173 | 2008 RV_{44} | — | September 2, 2008 | Kitt Peak | Spacewatch | · | 1.8 km | MPC · JPL |
| 336174 | 2008 RS_{46} | — | September 2, 2008 | Kitt Peak | Spacewatch | (5) | 1.4 km | MPC · JPL |
| 336175 | 2008 RK_{57} | — | September 3, 2008 | Kitt Peak | Spacewatch | · | 1.2 km | MPC · JPL |
| 336176 | 2008 RK_{66} | — | September 4, 2008 | Kitt Peak | Spacewatch | · | 1.7 km | MPC · JPL |
| 336177 Churri | 2008 RD_{80} | Churri | September 14, 2008 | La Cañada | Lacruz, J. | · | 1.6 km | MPC · JPL |
| 336178 | 2008 RJ_{87} | — | September 5, 2008 | Kitt Peak | Spacewatch | · | 3.0 km | MPC · JPL |
| 336179 | 2008 RS_{88} | — | September 5, 2008 | Kitt Peak | Spacewatch | · | 2.4 km | MPC · JPL |
| 336180 | 2008 RU_{88} | — | September 5, 2008 | Kitt Peak | Spacewatch | · | 1.9 km | MPC · JPL |
| 336181 | 2008 RN_{89} | — | September 5, 2008 | Kitt Peak | Spacewatch | · | 2.5 km | MPC · JPL |
| 336182 | 2008 RZ_{95} | — | September 7, 2008 | Catalina | CSS | · | 1.8 km | MPC · JPL |
| 336183 | 2008 RW_{103} | — | September 5, 2008 | Kitt Peak | Spacewatch | · | 3.9 km | MPC · JPL |
| 336184 | 2008 RN_{107} | — | September 7, 2008 | Mount Lemmon | Mount Lemmon Survey | · | 1.5 km | MPC · JPL |
| 336185 | 2008 RX_{112} | — | September 5, 2008 | Kitt Peak | Spacewatch | WIT | 1.3 km | MPC · JPL |
| 336186 | 2008 RM_{113} | — | September 5, 2008 | Kitt Peak | Spacewatch | HOF | 2.7 km | MPC · JPL |
| 336187 | 2008 RX_{113} | — | September 6, 2008 | Mount Lemmon | Mount Lemmon Survey | · | 1.6 km | MPC · JPL |
| 336188 | 2008 RE_{131} | — | September 9, 2008 | Mount Lemmon | Mount Lemmon Survey | · | 1.2 km | MPC · JPL |
| 336189 | 2008 RD_{132} | — | September 6, 2008 | Catalina | CSS | · | 2.4 km | MPC · JPL |
| 336190 | 2008 RL_{133} | — | September 9, 2008 | Catalina | CSS | · | 1.9 km | MPC · JPL |
| 336191 | 2008 RE_{136} | — | September 4, 2008 | Socorro | LINEAR | · | 2.2 km | MPC · JPL |
| 336192 | 2008 RS_{137} | — | September 5, 2008 | Kitt Peak | Spacewatch | PAD | 3.0 km | MPC · JPL |
| 336193 | 2008 RO_{138} | — | September 6, 2008 | Mount Lemmon | Mount Lemmon Survey | · | 810 m | MPC · JPL |
| 336194 | 2008 RM_{140} | — | September 9, 2008 | Catalina | CSS | · | 2.9 km | MPC · JPL |
| 336195 | 2008 RW_{141} | — | September 9, 2008 | Mount Lemmon | Mount Lemmon Survey | · | 2.5 km | MPC · JPL |
| 336196 | 2008 RY_{144} | — | September 5, 2008 | Kitt Peak | Spacewatch | · | 1.5 km | MPC · JPL |
| 336197 | 2008 RV_{145} | — | September 3, 2008 | Kitt Peak | Spacewatch | · | 1.7 km | MPC · JPL |
| 336198 | 2008 SR_{2} | — | September 23, 2008 | Grove Creek | Tozzi, F. | EUN | 1.8 km | MPC · JPL |
| 336199 | 2008 SG_{3} | — | September 22, 2008 | Socorro | LINEAR | · | 1.6 km | MPC · JPL |
| 336200 | 2008 SQ_{3} | — | September 22, 2008 | Socorro | LINEAR | · | 1.9 km | MPC · JPL |

== 336201–336300 ==
back to top

| Designation | | | Discovery | | | Properties | | Ref |
| Permanent | Provisional | Named after | Date | Site | Discoverer(s) | Category | Diam. | Ref |
|---|---|---|---|---|---|---|---|---|
| 336201 | 2008 SU_{3} | — | September 22, 2008 | Socorro | LINEAR | · | 3.1 km | MPC · JPL |
| 336202 | 2008 SE_{5} | — | September 22, 2008 | Socorro | LINEAR | · | 1.8 km | MPC · JPL |
| 336203 Sandrobuss | 2008 SE_{11} | Sandrobuss | September 22, 2008 | Vicques | M. Ory | MIS | 2.9 km | MPC · JPL |
| 336204 Sardinas | 2008 SM_{11} | Sardinas | September 24, 2008 | La Cañada | Lacruz, J. | · | 1.2 km | MPC · JPL |
| 336205 | 2008 SX_{18} | — | September 19, 2008 | Kitt Peak | Spacewatch | · | 1.8 km | MPC · JPL |
| 336206 | 2008 SP_{29} | — | September 19, 2008 | Kitt Peak | Spacewatch | · | 2.2 km | MPC · JPL |
| 336207 | 2008 SA_{31} | — | September 20, 2008 | Kitt Peak | Spacewatch | · | 1.8 km | MPC · JPL |
| 336208 | 2008 SP_{31} | — | September 20, 2008 | Kitt Peak | Spacewatch | · | 1.9 km | MPC · JPL |
| 336209 | 2008 SJ_{32} | — | September 20, 2008 | Kitt Peak | Spacewatch | · | 2.4 km | MPC · JPL |
| 336210 | 2008 SB_{44} | — | September 20, 2008 | Kitt Peak | Spacewatch | · | 1.7 km | MPC · JPL |
| 336211 | 2008 SH_{44} | — | September 20, 2008 | Kitt Peak | Spacewatch | · | 1.7 km | MPC · JPL |
| 336212 | 2008 SN_{45} | — | September 20, 2008 | Kitt Peak | Spacewatch | · | 1.6 km | MPC · JPL |
| 336213 | 2008 SC_{46} | — | September 20, 2008 | Kitt Peak | Spacewatch | AGN | 1.3 km | MPC · JPL |
| 336214 | 2008 SR_{49} | — | September 20, 2008 | Mount Lemmon | Mount Lemmon Survey | · | 1.2 km | MPC · JPL |
| 336215 | 2008 SS_{50} | — | September 20, 2008 | Mount Lemmon | Mount Lemmon Survey | · | 1.1 km | MPC · JPL |
| 336216 | 2008 SE_{55} | — | September 20, 2008 | Mount Lemmon | Mount Lemmon Survey | · | 1.5 km | MPC · JPL |
| 336217 | 2008 SP_{55} | — | September 20, 2008 | Mount Lemmon | Mount Lemmon Survey | · | 2.0 km | MPC · JPL |
| 336218 | 2008 SH_{56} | — | September 20, 2008 | Kitt Peak | Spacewatch | · | 2.4 km | MPC · JPL |
| 336219 | 2008 SK_{56} | — | September 20, 2008 | Mount Lemmon | Mount Lemmon Survey | · | 2.0 km | MPC · JPL |
| 336220 | 2008 SR_{58} | — | September 20, 2008 | Kitt Peak | Spacewatch | · | 2.0 km | MPC · JPL |
| 336221 | 2008 SJ_{63} | — | September 21, 2008 | Kitt Peak | Spacewatch | · | 1.2 km | MPC · JPL |
| 336222 | 2008 SZ_{64} | — | September 21, 2008 | Mount Lemmon | Mount Lemmon Survey | · | 1.1 km | MPC · JPL |
| 336223 | 2008 SC_{72} | — | September 22, 2008 | Catalina | CSS | EUN | 1.4 km | MPC · JPL |
| 336224 | 2008 SZ_{73} | — | September 23, 2008 | Kitt Peak | Spacewatch | · | 1.4 km | MPC · JPL |
| 336225 | 2008 SA_{78} | — | September 23, 2008 | Mount Lemmon | Mount Lemmon Survey | NEM | 2.4 km | MPC · JPL |
| 336226 | 2008 SE_{81} | — | September 23, 2008 | Mount Lemmon | Mount Lemmon Survey | (5) | 1.6 km | MPC · JPL |
| 336227 | 2008 SJ_{81} | — | September 23, 2008 | Mount Lemmon | Mount Lemmon Survey | · | 2.5 km | MPC · JPL |
| 336228 | 2008 SU_{81} | — | September 25, 2008 | Sierra Stars | Tozzi, F. | · | 1.6 km | MPC · JPL |
| 336229 | 2008 SF_{84} | — | September 25, 2008 | Dauban | Kugel, F. | DOR | 2.6 km | MPC · JPL |
| 336230 | 2008 SS_{88} | — | September 20, 2008 | Kitt Peak | Spacewatch | · | 1.9 km | MPC · JPL |
| 336231 | 2008 SZ_{90} | — | September 21, 2008 | Kitt Peak | Spacewatch | · | 1.9 km | MPC · JPL |
| 336232 | 2008 SM_{95} | — | September 21, 2008 | Kitt Peak | Spacewatch | · | 2.4 km | MPC · JPL |
| 336233 | 2008 SF_{98} | — | September 21, 2008 | Kitt Peak | Spacewatch | · | 1.4 km | MPC · JPL |
| 336234 | 2008 SJ_{99} | — | September 21, 2008 | Kitt Peak | Spacewatch | AGN | 1.5 km | MPC · JPL |
| 336235 | 2008 SP_{100} | — | September 21, 2008 | Kitt Peak | Spacewatch | · | 2.5 km | MPC · JPL |
| 336236 | 2008 SQ_{104} | — | September 21, 2008 | Kitt Peak | Spacewatch | · | 2.3 km | MPC · JPL |
| 336237 | 2008 SJ_{106} | — | September 21, 2008 | Kitt Peak | Spacewatch | · | 2.3 km | MPC · JPL |
| 336238 | 2008 SV_{107} | — | September 9, 2008 | Kitt Peak | Spacewatch | · | 2.0 km | MPC · JPL |
| 336239 | 2008 SD_{110} | — | September 22, 2008 | Kitt Peak | Spacewatch | · | 1.5 km | MPC · JPL |
| 336240 | 2008 SF_{112} | — | September 22, 2008 | Kitt Peak | Spacewatch | · | 1.6 km | MPC · JPL |
| 336241 | 2008 SK_{112} | — | September 22, 2008 | Kitt Peak | Spacewatch | · | 1.5 km | MPC · JPL |
| 336242 | 2008 SL_{112} | — | September 22, 2008 | Kitt Peak | Spacewatch | · | 1.4 km | MPC · JPL |
| 336243 | 2008 SB_{116} | — | September 22, 2008 | Kitt Peak | Spacewatch | · | 1.4 km | MPC · JPL |
| 336244 | 2008 SD_{116} | — | September 24, 1995 | Kitt Peak | Spacewatch | · | 1.5 km | MPC · JPL |
| 336245 | 2008 ST_{117} | — | September 22, 2008 | Mount Lemmon | Mount Lemmon Survey | · | 1.5 km | MPC · JPL |
| 336246 | 2008 SV_{119} | — | September 22, 2008 | Mount Lemmon | Mount Lemmon Survey | · | 1.5 km | MPC · JPL |
| 336247 | 2008 SH_{123} | — | September 22, 2008 | Mount Lemmon | Mount Lemmon Survey | · | 2.5 km | MPC · JPL |
| 336248 | 2008 SH_{124} | — | September 22, 2008 | Mount Lemmon | Mount Lemmon Survey | · | 2.5 km | MPC · JPL |
| 336249 | 2008 SX_{126} | — | September 22, 2008 | Kitt Peak | Spacewatch | · | 1.8 km | MPC · JPL |
| 336250 | 2008 SM_{129} | — | September 22, 2008 | Kitt Peak | Spacewatch | MRX | 1.0 km | MPC · JPL |
| 336251 | 2008 SG_{130} | — | September 22, 2008 | Kitt Peak | Spacewatch | · | 2.0 km | MPC · JPL |
| 336252 | 2008 SF_{133} | — | September 22, 2008 | Kitt Peak | Spacewatch | · | 1.8 km | MPC · JPL |
| 336253 | 2008 SW_{137} | — | September 23, 2008 | Kitt Peak | Spacewatch | MAR | 1.7 km | MPC · JPL |
| 336254 | 2008 SC_{143} | — | September 24, 2008 | Mount Lemmon | Mount Lemmon Survey | · | 2.0 km | MPC · JPL |
| 336255 | 2008 SW_{147} | — | September 25, 2008 | Goodricke-Pigott | R. A. Tucker | · | 2.3 km | MPC · JPL |
| 336256 | 2008 ST_{149} | — | September 29, 2008 | Dauban | Kugel, F. | (5) | 1.3 km | MPC · JPL |
| 336257 | 2008 SX_{149} | — | September 29, 2008 | Dauban | Kugel, F. | · | 2.1 km | MPC · JPL |
| 336258 | 2008 SU_{155} | — | September 23, 2008 | Socorro | LINEAR | · | 2.7 km | MPC · JPL |
| 336259 | 2008 SK_{163} | — | September 28, 2008 | Socorro | LINEAR | · | 1.5 km | MPC · JPL |
| 336260 | 2008 SE_{165} | — | September 28, 2008 | Socorro | LINEAR | · | 2.0 km | MPC · JPL |
| 336261 | 2008 SC_{166} | — | September 28, 2008 | Socorro | LINEAR | · | 1.6 km | MPC · JPL |
| 336262 | 2008 SD_{167} | — | September 28, 2008 | Socorro | LINEAR | · | 1.6 km | MPC · JPL |
| 336263 | 2008 SV_{167} | — | September 28, 2008 | Socorro | LINEAR | · | 1.4 km | MPC · JPL |
| 336264 | 2008 SY_{167} | — | September 28, 2008 | Socorro | LINEAR | · | 1.7 km | MPC · JPL |
| 336265 | 2008 SS_{173} | — | September 22, 2008 | Kitt Peak | Spacewatch | · | 2.0 km | MPC · JPL |
| 336266 | 2008 SK_{174} | — | September 22, 2008 | Catalina | CSS | EUN | 1.8 km | MPC · JPL |
| 336267 | 2008 SO_{176} | — | September 23, 2008 | Mount Lemmon | Mount Lemmon Survey | · | 2.0 km | MPC · JPL |
| 336268 | 2008 SL_{179} | — | August 24, 2008 | Kitt Peak | Spacewatch | EUN | 1.6 km | MPC · JPL |
| 336269 | 2008 SP_{191} | — | September 25, 2008 | Kitt Peak | Spacewatch | HOF | 3.2 km | MPC · JPL |
| 336270 | 2008 SV_{192} | — | September 25, 2008 | Kitt Peak | Spacewatch | · | 1.6 km | MPC · JPL |
| 336271 | 2008 SD_{200} | — | September 26, 2008 | Kitt Peak | Spacewatch | · | 1.6 km | MPC · JPL |
| 336272 | 2008 SX_{201} | — | September 26, 2008 | Kitt Peak | Spacewatch | · | 1.9 km | MPC · JPL |
| 336273 | 2008 SF_{218} | — | September 30, 2008 | La Sagra | OAM | · | 2.4 km | MPC · JPL |
| 336274 | 2008 SG_{224} | — | September 26, 2008 | Kitt Peak | Spacewatch | · | 1.7 km | MPC · JPL |
| 336275 | 2008 SO_{239} | — | September 29, 2008 | Mount Lemmon | Mount Lemmon Survey | · | 1.5 km | MPC · JPL |
| 336276 | 2008 SB_{240} | — | September 21, 2008 | Kitt Peak | Spacewatch | · | 2.2 km | MPC · JPL |
| 336277 | 2008 SW_{241} | — | September 29, 2008 | Catalina | CSS | AGN | 1.6 km | MPC · JPL |
| 336278 | 2008 SL_{245} | — | September 29, 2008 | Catalina | CSS | · | 1.9 km | MPC · JPL |
| 336279 | 2008 SR_{245} | — | September 29, 2008 | Catalina | CSS | · | 1.6 km | MPC · JPL |
| 336280 | 2008 SC_{249} | — | September 21, 2008 | Catalina | CSS | EUN | 2.0 km | MPC · JPL |
| 336281 | 2008 SA_{250} | — | September 23, 2008 | Mount Lemmon | Mount Lemmon Survey | · | 1.7 km | MPC · JPL |
| 336282 | 2008 SH_{250} | — | September 23, 2008 | Kitt Peak | Spacewatch | · | 1.5 km | MPC · JPL |
| 336283 | 2008 SK_{250} | — | September 23, 2008 | Kitt Peak | Spacewatch | AST | 1.7 km | MPC · JPL |
| 336284 | 2008 SC_{253} | — | September 21, 2008 | Kitt Peak | Spacewatch | · | 1.8 km | MPC · JPL |
| 336285 | 2008 SL_{253} | — | September 21, 2008 | Mount Lemmon | Mount Lemmon Survey | GEF | 1.3 km | MPC · JPL |
| 336286 | 2008 SD_{271} | — | September 28, 2008 | Mount Lemmon | Mount Lemmon Survey | · | 1.8 km | MPC · JPL |
| 336287 | 2008 SK_{272} | — | September 22, 2008 | Kitt Peak | Spacewatch | · | 3.1 km | MPC · JPL |
| 336288 | 2008 SQ_{280} | — | September 22, 2008 | Catalina | CSS | · | 2.0 km | MPC · JPL |
| 336289 | 2008 SB_{282} | — | September 25, 2008 | Goodricke-Pigott | R. A. Tucker | KON | 3.5 km | MPC · JPL |
| 336290 | 2008 SQ_{285} | — | September 21, 2008 | Kitt Peak | Spacewatch | · | 2.1 km | MPC · JPL |
| 336291 | 2008 SL_{289} | — | September 26, 2008 | Kitt Peak | Spacewatch | HOF | 2.6 km | MPC · JPL |
| 336292 | 2008 SV_{289} | — | September 27, 2008 | Mount Lemmon | Mount Lemmon Survey | EUN | 1.4 km | MPC · JPL |
| 336293 | 2008 SW_{289} | — | September 27, 2008 | Mount Lemmon | Mount Lemmon Survey | EUN | 1.5 km | MPC · JPL |
| 336294 | 2008 SB_{295} | — | September 23, 2008 | Catalina | CSS | · | 2.6 km | MPC · JPL |
| 336295 | 2008 SS_{298} | — | September 21, 2008 | Catalina | CSS | · | 1.6 km | MPC · JPL |
| 336296 | 2008 SH_{299} | — | September 22, 2008 | Mount Lemmon | Mount Lemmon Survey | WIT | 1.0 km | MPC · JPL |
| 336297 | 2008 SH_{301} | — | September 23, 2008 | Socorro | LINEAR | (5) | 1.6 km | MPC · JPL |
| 336298 | 2008 SB_{302} | — | September 23, 2008 | Mount Lemmon | Mount Lemmon Survey | · | 2.0 km | MPC · JPL |
| 336299 | 2008 SM_{308} | — | September 30, 2008 | Catalina | CSS | ADE | 3.1 km | MPC · JPL |
| 336300 | 2008 SK_{309} | — | September 24, 2008 | Mount Lemmon | Mount Lemmon Survey | EOS | 1.8 km | MPC · JPL |

== 336301–336400 ==
back to top

| Designation | | | Discovery | | | Properties | | Ref |
| Permanent | Provisional | Named after | Date | Site | Discoverer(s) | Category | Diam. | Ref |
|---|---|---|---|---|---|---|---|---|
| 336301 | 2008 TV_{1} | — | October 2, 2008 | Pla D'Arguines | R. Ferrando | (5) | 1.6 km | MPC · JPL |
| 336302 | 2008 TZ_{2} | — | April 11, 2007 | Siding Spring | SSS | · | 2.2 km | MPC · JPL |
| 336303 | 2008 TG_{3} | — | October 3, 2008 | Hibiscus | Teamo, N. | · | 2.8 km | MPC · JPL |
| 336304 | 2008 TW_{3} | — | October 3, 2008 | Socorro | LINEAR | · | 1.6 km | MPC · JPL |
| 336305 | 2008 TR_{5} | — | October 1, 2008 | La Sagra | OAM | · | 1.3 km | MPC · JPL |
| 336306 | 2008 TF_{6} | — | October 3, 2008 | La Sagra | OAM | GEF | 1.5 km | MPC · JPL |
| 336307 | 2008 TR_{14} | — | October 1, 2008 | Mount Lemmon | Mount Lemmon Survey | · | 1.7 km | MPC · JPL |
| 336308 | 2008 TO_{24} | — | March 5, 2006 | Kitt Peak | Spacewatch | HOF | 3.2 km | MPC · JPL |
| 336309 | 2008 TX_{27} | — | October 1, 2008 | Mount Lemmon | Mount Lemmon Survey | BRG | 1.6 km | MPC · JPL |
| 336310 | 2008 TM_{31} | — | October 1, 2008 | Kitt Peak | Spacewatch | KOR | 1.5 km | MPC · JPL |
| 336311 | 2008 TU_{38} | — | October 1, 2008 | Kitt Peak | Spacewatch | · | 2.8 km | MPC · JPL |
| 336312 | 2008 TL_{39} | — | October 1, 2008 | Kitt Peak | Spacewatch | · | 1.6 km | MPC · JPL |
| 336313 | 2008 TO_{41} | — | October 1, 2008 | Mount Lemmon | Mount Lemmon Survey | JUN | 1.4 km | MPC · JPL |
| 336314 | 2008 TC_{45} | — | October 1, 2008 | Mount Lemmon | Mount Lemmon Survey | · | 2.6 km | MPC · JPL |
| 336315 | 2008 TL_{48} | — | October 2, 2008 | Kitt Peak | Spacewatch | · | 1.2 km | MPC · JPL |
| 336316 | 2008 TF_{51} | — | October 2, 2008 | Kitt Peak | Spacewatch | · | 1.7 km | MPC · JPL |
| 336317 | 2008 TD_{59} | — | October 2, 2008 | Kitt Peak | Spacewatch | · | 1.9 km | MPC · JPL |
| 336318 | 2008 TQ_{62} | — | October 2, 2008 | Kitt Peak | Spacewatch | · | 1.6 km | MPC · JPL |
| 336319 | 2008 TL_{63} | — | October 2, 2008 | Kitt Peak | Spacewatch | · | 1.6 km | MPC · JPL |
| 336320 | 2008 TK_{66} | — | October 2, 2008 | Kitt Peak | Spacewatch | KOR | 1.7 km | MPC · JPL |
| 336321 | 2008 TC_{69} | — | October 2, 2008 | Kitt Peak | Spacewatch | · | 1.5 km | MPC · JPL |
| 336322 | 2008 TJ_{69} | — | October 2, 2008 | Kitt Peak | Spacewatch | ADE | 1.9 km | MPC · JPL |
| 336323 | 2008 TO_{70} | — | September 23, 2008 | Kitt Peak | Spacewatch | AGN | 1.5 km | MPC · JPL |
| 336324 | 2008 TB_{72} | — | October 2, 2008 | Kitt Peak | Spacewatch | · | 1.8 km | MPC · JPL |
| 336325 | 2008 TO_{72} | — | October 2, 2008 | Kitt Peak | Spacewatch | AGN | 1.3 km | MPC · JPL |
| 336326 | 2008 TE_{75} | — | October 2, 2008 | Kitt Peak | Spacewatch | · | 1.8 km | MPC · JPL |
| 336327 | 2008 TZ_{78} | — | October 2, 2008 | Mount Lemmon | Mount Lemmon Survey | · | 1.3 km | MPC · JPL |
| 336328 | 2008 TC_{81} | — | October 2, 2008 | Mount Lemmon | Mount Lemmon Survey | · | 1.3 km | MPC · JPL |
| 336329 | 2008 TR_{86} | — | October 3, 2008 | Mount Lemmon | Mount Lemmon Survey | · | 1.5 km | MPC · JPL |
| 336330 | 2008 TT_{86} | — | October 3, 2008 | Kitt Peak | Spacewatch | WIT | 1.1 km | MPC · JPL |
| 336331 | 2008 TX_{86} | — | October 3, 2008 | Kitt Peak | Spacewatch | · | 1.6 km | MPC · JPL |
| 336332 | 2008 TB_{87} | — | October 3, 2008 | Kitt Peak | Spacewatch | · | 1.8 km | MPC · JPL |
| 336333 | 2008 TT_{87} | — | October 3, 2008 | Kitt Peak | Spacewatch | · | 2.0 km | MPC · JPL |
| 336334 | 2008 TG_{92} | — | October 4, 2008 | La Sagra | OAM | · | 2.5 km | MPC · JPL |
| 336335 | 2008 TU_{92} | — | October 4, 2008 | La Sagra | OAM | · | 1.3 km | MPC · JPL |
| 336336 | 2008 TF_{93} | — | October 5, 2008 | La Sagra | OAM | (11882) | 1.6 km | MPC · JPL |
| 336337 | 2008 TG_{93} | — | October 5, 2008 | La Sagra | OAM | · | 1.4 km | MPC · JPL |
| 336338 | 2008 TJ_{102} | — | October 6, 2008 | Kitt Peak | Spacewatch | · | 1.7 km | MPC · JPL |
| 336339 | 2008 TA_{105} | — | October 6, 2008 | Kitt Peak | Spacewatch | · | 2.8 km | MPC · JPL |
| 336340 | 2008 TG_{110} | — | October 6, 2008 | Catalina | CSS | EUN · | 2.9 km | MPC · JPL |
| 336341 | 2008 TX_{113} | — | October 6, 2008 | Kitt Peak | Spacewatch | GEF | 1.9 km | MPC · JPL |
| 336342 | 2008 TA_{115} | — | October 6, 2008 | Mount Lemmon | Mount Lemmon Survey | · | 2.9 km | MPC · JPL |
| 336343 | 2008 TK_{116} | — | October 6, 2008 | Catalina | CSS | · | 2.4 km | MPC · JPL |
| 336344 | 2008 TY_{117} | — | October 6, 2008 | Kitt Peak | Spacewatch | · | 1.4 km | MPC · JPL |
| 336345 | 2008 TK_{119} | — | February 25, 2006 | Kitt Peak | Spacewatch | AEO | 2.1 km | MPC · JPL |
| 336346 | 2008 TZ_{119} | — | October 7, 2008 | Kitt Peak | Spacewatch | · | 1.6 km | MPC · JPL |
| 336347 | 2008 TH_{123} | — | October 7, 2008 | Kitt Peak | Spacewatch | · | 2.6 km | MPC · JPL |
| 336348 | 2008 TZ_{123} | — | October 8, 2008 | Mount Lemmon | Mount Lemmon Survey | · | 2.0 km | MPC · JPL |
| 336349 | 2008 TF_{126} | — | October 8, 2008 | Mount Lemmon | Mount Lemmon Survey | · | 2.3 km | MPC · JPL |
| 336350 | 2008 TA_{128} | — | October 8, 2008 | Mount Lemmon | Mount Lemmon Survey | · | 1.9 km | MPC · JPL |
| 336351 | 2008 TR_{128} | — | October 8, 2008 | Catalina | CSS | (12739) | 2.2 km | MPC · JPL |
| 336352 | 2008 TA_{130} | — | October 8, 2008 | Mount Lemmon | Mount Lemmon Survey | · | 2.8 km | MPC · JPL |
| 336353 | 2008 TF_{160} | — | October 1, 2008 | Kitt Peak | Spacewatch | · | 2.0 km | MPC · JPL |
| 336354 | 2008 TF_{168} | — | October 1, 2008 | Catalina | CSS | · | 2.7 km | MPC · JPL |
| 336355 | 2008 TR_{175} | — | October 9, 2008 | Kitt Peak | Spacewatch | · | 2.0 km | MPC · JPL |
| 336356 | 2008 TW_{178} | — | March 16, 2007 | Kitt Peak | Spacewatch | · | 1.6 km | MPC · JPL |
| 336357 | 2008 TE_{180} | — | December 7, 2004 | Socorro | LINEAR | JUN | 1.3 km | MPC · JPL |
| 336358 | 2008 TQ_{182} | — | October 2, 2008 | Socorro | LINEAR | EUN | 1.2 km | MPC · JPL |
| 336359 | 2008 TC_{184} | — | October 4, 2008 | La Sagra | OAM | · | 2.7 km | MPC · JPL |
| 336360 | 2008 TZ_{184} | — | October 6, 2008 | Mount Lemmon | Mount Lemmon Survey | NEM | 2.9 km | MPC · JPL |
| 336361 | 2008 UT | — | October 19, 2008 | Wildberg | R. Apitzsch | · | 1.6 km | MPC · JPL |
| 336362 | 2008 UQ_{3} | — | October 7, 2008 | Catalina | CSS | · | 2.5 km | MPC · JPL |
| 336363 | 2008 UV_{6} | — | October 23, 2008 | Kitt Peak | Spacewatch | · | 2.1 km | MPC · JPL |
| 336364 | 2008 UQ_{28} | — | October 20, 2008 | Kitt Peak | Spacewatch | · | 2.1 km | MPC · JPL |
| 336365 | 2008 UO_{29} | — | October 20, 2008 | Kitt Peak | Spacewatch | KOR | 1.5 km | MPC · JPL |
| 336366 | 2008 UB_{31} | — | October 20, 2008 | Kitt Peak | Spacewatch | EUP | 3.8 km | MPC · JPL |
| 336367 | 2008 UY_{35} | — | October 20, 2008 | Mount Lemmon | Mount Lemmon Survey | · | 2.2 km | MPC · JPL |
| 336368 | 2008 UK_{38} | — | October 20, 2008 | Kitt Peak | Spacewatch | GEF | 1.7 km | MPC · JPL |
| 336369 | 2008 UU_{40} | — | October 22, 2003 | Kitt Peak | Spacewatch | · | 2.0 km | MPC · JPL |
| 336370 | 2008 UF_{42} | — | October 20, 2008 | Kitt Peak | Spacewatch | · | 2.1 km | MPC · JPL |
| 336371 | 2008 UZ_{46} | — | October 20, 2008 | Kitt Peak | Spacewatch | AGN | 1.1 km | MPC · JPL |
| 336372 | 2008 UA_{47} | — | October 20, 2008 | Kitt Peak | Spacewatch | EOS · | 4.9 km | MPC · JPL |
| 336373 | 2008 UG_{47} | — | October 20, 2008 | Kitt Peak | Spacewatch | · | 2.4 km | MPC · JPL |
| 336374 | 2008 UM_{54} | — | October 20, 2008 | Mount Lemmon | Mount Lemmon Survey | · | 2.5 km | MPC · JPL |
| 336375 | 2008 US_{54} | — | October 20, 2008 | Mount Lemmon | Mount Lemmon Survey | · | 2.4 km | MPC · JPL |
| 336376 | 2008 UE_{60} | — | October 21, 2008 | Kitt Peak | Spacewatch | · | 2.2 km | MPC · JPL |
| 336377 | 2008 UW_{60} | — | October 21, 2008 | Kitt Peak | Spacewatch | · | 2.8 km | MPC · JPL |
| 336378 | 2008 UY_{62} | — | October 21, 2008 | Kitt Peak | Spacewatch | · | 1.9 km | MPC · JPL |
| 336379 | 2008 UO_{63} | — | October 21, 2008 | Kitt Peak | Spacewatch | · | 2.2 km | MPC · JPL |
| 336380 | 2008 UQ_{65} | — | October 21, 2008 | Kitt Peak | Spacewatch | · | 1.7 km | MPC · JPL |
| 336381 | 2008 UJ_{68} | — | October 21, 2008 | Mount Lemmon | Mount Lemmon Survey | · | 1.9 km | MPC · JPL |
| 336382 | 2008 UX_{70} | — | October 21, 2008 | Kitt Peak | Spacewatch | EUN | 1.8 km | MPC · JPL |
| 336383 | 2008 UY_{74} | — | October 21, 2008 | Kitt Peak | Spacewatch | · | 3.0 km | MPC · JPL |
| 336384 | 2008 UR_{75} | — | October 21, 2008 | Kitt Peak | Spacewatch | AGN | 1.5 km | MPC · JPL |
| 336385 | 2008 UC_{76} | — | October 21, 2008 | Kitt Peak | Spacewatch | · | 1.9 km | MPC · JPL |
| 336386 | 2008 UL_{76} | — | October 21, 2008 | Kitt Peak | Spacewatch | · | 2.0 km | MPC · JPL |
| 336387 | 2008 UY_{79} | — | October 22, 2008 | Kitt Peak | Spacewatch | · | 2.5 km | MPC · JPL |
| 336388 | 2008 UO_{86} | — | October 23, 2008 | Kitt Peak | Spacewatch | · | 1.8 km | MPC · JPL |
| 336389 | 2008 UF_{88} | — | September 22, 2008 | Kitt Peak | Spacewatch | · | 2.3 km | MPC · JPL |
| 336390 | 2008 UL_{89} | — | October 24, 2008 | Mount Lemmon | Mount Lemmon Survey | · | 1.9 km | MPC · JPL |
| 336391 | 2008 UN_{92} | — | September 29, 2008 | Catalina | CSS | · | 2.2 km | MPC · JPL |
| 336392 Changhua | 2008 UU_{94} | Changhua | October 23, 2008 | Lulin | Hsiao, X. Y., Q. Ye | · | 1.9 km | MPC · JPL |
| 336393 | 2008 UM_{95} | — | October 27, 2008 | Sierra Stars | Dillon, W. G., Wells, D. | AGN | 1.2 km | MPC · JPL |
| 336394 | 2008 UZ_{97} | — | October 7, 2008 | Mount Lemmon | Mount Lemmon Survey | · | 2.4 km | MPC · JPL |
| 336395 | 2008 UQ_{111} | — | October 22, 2008 | Kitt Peak | Spacewatch | · | 2.3 km | MPC · JPL |
| 336396 | 2008 UK_{116} | — | October 22, 2008 | Kitt Peak | Spacewatch | · | 2.1 km | MPC · JPL |
| 336397 | 2008 UV_{116} | — | October 22, 2008 | Kitt Peak | Spacewatch | · | 1.9 km | MPC · JPL |
| 336398 | 2008 UM_{117} | — | October 22, 2008 | Kitt Peak | Spacewatch | · | 2.2 km | MPC · JPL |
| 336399 | 2008 UP_{118} | — | October 22, 2008 | Kitt Peak | Spacewatch | · | 2.3 km | MPC · JPL |
| 336400 | 2008 UW_{131} | — | October 23, 2008 | Kitt Peak | Spacewatch | KOR | 1.5 km | MPC · JPL |

== 336401–336500 ==
back to top

| Designation | | | Discovery | | | Properties | | Ref |
| Permanent | Provisional | Named after | Date | Site | Discoverer(s) | Category | Diam. | Ref |
|---|---|---|---|---|---|---|---|---|
| 336401 | 2008 UJ_{133} | — | October 23, 2008 | Kitt Peak | Spacewatch | · | 1.9 km | MPC · JPL |
| 336402 | 2008 UP_{139} | — | October 2, 2008 | Mount Lemmon | Mount Lemmon Survey | · | 3.2 km | MPC · JPL |
| 336403 | 2008 UM_{151} | — | October 23, 2008 | Kitt Peak | Spacewatch | · | 2.1 km | MPC · JPL |
| 336404 | 2008 UC_{156} | — | October 23, 2008 | Kitt Peak | Spacewatch | · | 2.0 km | MPC · JPL |
| 336405 | 2008 UL_{157} | — | October 23, 2008 | Mount Lemmon | Mount Lemmon Survey | · | 2.1 km | MPC · JPL |
| 336406 | 2008 UA_{161} | — | October 24, 2008 | Črni Vrh | Mikuž, B. | · | 2.6 km | MPC · JPL |
| 336407 | 2008 UL_{163} | — | October 24, 2008 | Kitt Peak | Spacewatch | · | 2.4 km | MPC · JPL |
| 336408 | 2008 UW_{168} | — | October 24, 2008 | Kitt Peak | Spacewatch | · | 1.9 km | MPC · JPL |
| 336409 | 2008 UK_{176} | — | October 24, 2008 | Mount Lemmon | Mount Lemmon Survey | · | 2.0 km | MPC · JPL |
| 336410 | 2008 UG_{178} | — | October 24, 2008 | Mount Lemmon | Mount Lemmon Survey | · | 2.2 km | MPC · JPL |
| 336411 | 2008 UA_{179} | — | October 24, 2008 | Catalina | CSS | · | 3.7 km | MPC · JPL |
| 336412 | 2008 UX_{185} | — | October 24, 2008 | Kitt Peak | Spacewatch | · | 5.2 km | MPC · JPL |
| 336413 | 2008 UE_{187} | — | October 24, 2008 | Kitt Peak | Spacewatch | · | 2.3 km | MPC · JPL |
| 336414 | 2008 UX_{198} | — | October 27, 2008 | Socorro | LINEAR | · | 2.9 km | MPC · JPL |
| 336415 | 2008 UD_{200} | — | October 26, 2008 | Socorro | LINEAR | · | 1.3 km | MPC · JPL |
| 336416 | 2008 UG_{200} | — | October 26, 2008 | Socorro | LINEAR | · | 1.7 km | MPC · JPL |
| 336417 | 2008 UD_{201} | — | October 28, 2008 | Socorro | LINEAR | · | 1.8 km | MPC · JPL |
| 336418 | 2008 UB_{204} | — | September 28, 2008 | Mount Lemmon | Mount Lemmon Survey | (5) | 1.7 km | MPC · JPL |
| 336419 | 2008 UL_{207} | — | October 23, 2008 | Kitt Peak | Spacewatch | EOS | 2.2 km | MPC · JPL |
| 336420 | 2008 UM_{207} | — | October 23, 2008 | Kitt Peak | Spacewatch | · | 2.9 km | MPC · JPL |
| 336421 | 2008 UW_{213} | — | October 24, 2008 | Catalina | CSS | EUN | 1.6 km | MPC · JPL |
| 336422 | 2008 UZ_{216} | — | October 25, 2008 | Catalina | CSS | · | 2.3 km | MPC · JPL |
| 336423 | 2008 UF_{218} | — | October 25, 2008 | Kitt Peak | Spacewatch | · | 1.8 km | MPC · JPL |
| 336424 | 2008 UM_{227} | — | October 25, 2008 | Kitt Peak | Spacewatch | MRX | 1.7 km | MPC · JPL |
| 336425 | 2008 UZ_{227} | — | October 25, 2008 | Catalina | CSS | EUN | 1.5 km | MPC · JPL |
| 336426 | 2008 UX_{234} | — | October 26, 2008 | Mount Lemmon | Mount Lemmon Survey | · | 2.6 km | MPC · JPL |
| 336427 | 2008 UH_{240} | — | October 26, 2008 | Kitt Peak | Spacewatch | EOS | 2.2 km | MPC · JPL |
| 336428 | 2008 UO_{240} | — | October 26, 2008 | Kitt Peak | Spacewatch | · | 2.1 km | MPC · JPL |
| 336429 | 2008 UQ_{242} | — | October 26, 2008 | Kitt Peak | Spacewatch | VER | 4.1 km | MPC · JPL |
| 336430 | 2008 UJ_{245} | — | October 26, 2008 | Kitt Peak | Spacewatch | · | 2.2 km | MPC · JPL |
| 336431 | 2008 UC_{247} | — | October 26, 2008 | Kitt Peak | Spacewatch | AGN | 1.2 km | MPC · JPL |
| 336432 | 2008 UK_{250} | — | October 27, 2008 | Kitt Peak | Spacewatch | · | 2.4 km | MPC · JPL |
| 336433 | 2008 UX_{252} | — | October 27, 2008 | Kitt Peak | Spacewatch | · | 2.1 km | MPC · JPL |
| 336434 | 2008 US_{258} | — | October 27, 2008 | Kitt Peak | Spacewatch | · | 1.6 km | MPC · JPL |
| 336435 | 2008 UG_{265} | — | October 28, 2008 | Kitt Peak | Spacewatch | HOF | 2.7 km | MPC · JPL |
| 336436 | 2008 UW_{265} | — | October 28, 2008 | Kitt Peak | Spacewatch | · | 2.3 km | MPC · JPL |
| 336437 | 2008 UC_{266} | — | October 28, 2008 | Kitt Peak | Spacewatch | · | 2.0 km | MPC · JPL |
| 336438 | 2008 UP_{281} | — | October 28, 2008 | Kitt Peak | Spacewatch | KOR | 1.3 km | MPC · JPL |
| 336439 | 2008 UZ_{282} | — | September 29, 2008 | Kitt Peak | Spacewatch | HOF | 2.9 km | MPC · JPL |
| 336440 | 2008 UD_{299} | — | October 29, 2008 | Kitt Peak | Spacewatch | AGN | 1.3 km | MPC · JPL |
| 336441 | 2008 UO_{301} | — | October 29, 2008 | Mount Lemmon | Mount Lemmon Survey | · | 2.6 km | MPC · JPL |
| 336442 | 2008 UP_{303} | — | October 29, 2008 | Kitt Peak | Spacewatch | · | 2.1 km | MPC · JPL |
| 336443 | 2008 UN_{305} | — | October 30, 2008 | Kitt Peak | Spacewatch | · | 2.0 km | MPC · JPL |
| 336444 | 2008 UR_{312} | — | October 30, 2008 | Kitt Peak | Spacewatch | · | 5.3 km | MPC · JPL |
| 336445 | 2008 UG_{316} | — | October 30, 2008 | Kitt Peak | Spacewatch | · | 3.1 km | MPC · JPL |
| 336446 | 2008 UD_{321} | — | October 31, 2008 | Mount Lemmon | Mount Lemmon Survey | · | 1.6 km | MPC · JPL |
| 336447 | 2008 UN_{324} | — | October 31, 2008 | Kitt Peak | Spacewatch | · | 2.3 km | MPC · JPL |
| 336448 | 2008 UP_{330} | — | October 31, 2008 | Kitt Peak | Spacewatch | · | 1.4 km | MPC · JPL |
| 336449 | 2008 UD_{339} | — | October 22, 2008 | Kitt Peak | Spacewatch | KOR | 1.9 km | MPC · JPL |
| 336450 | 2008 UF_{340} | — | October 23, 2008 | Mount Lemmon | Mount Lemmon Survey | · | 5.5 km | MPC · JPL |
| 336451 | 2008 UM_{340} | — | October 23, 2008 | Kitt Peak | Spacewatch | EOS | 2.9 km | MPC · JPL |
| 336452 | 2008 UQ_{341} | — | October 26, 2008 | Kitt Peak | Spacewatch | · | 3.2 km | MPC · JPL |
| 336453 | 2008 UO_{342} | — | October 28, 2008 | Mount Lemmon | Mount Lemmon Survey | KOR | 1.2 km | MPC · JPL |
| 336454 | 2008 UD_{344} | — | October 28, 2008 | Kitt Peak | Spacewatch | HOF | 2.8 km | MPC · JPL |
| 336455 | 2008 UE_{344} | — | October 28, 2008 | Kitt Peak | Spacewatch | HOF | 3.5 km | MPC · JPL |
| 336456 | 2008 UB_{358} | — | October 25, 2008 | Mount Lemmon | Mount Lemmon Survey | AGN | 1.3 km | MPC · JPL |
| 336457 | 2008 UJ_{358} | — | October 26, 2008 | Kitt Peak | Spacewatch | · | 5.4 km | MPC · JPL |
| 336458 | 2008 UU_{358} | — | October 26, 2008 | Kitt Peak | Spacewatch | · | 3.2 km | MPC · JPL |
| 336459 | 2008 UC_{360} | — | October 29, 2008 | Kitt Peak | Spacewatch | · | 2.7 km | MPC · JPL |
| 336460 | 2008 UL_{362} | — | October 25, 2008 | Catalina | CSS | EUN | 1.7 km | MPC · JPL |
| 336461 | 2008 UQ_{366} | — | October 21, 2008 | Mount Lemmon | Mount Lemmon Survey | · | 4.3 km | MPC · JPL |
| 336462 | 2008 UK_{368} | — | October 23, 2008 | Mount Lemmon | Mount Lemmon Survey | EOS | 3.4 km | MPC · JPL |
| 336463 | 2008 UT_{368} | — | October 25, 2008 | Mount Lemmon | Mount Lemmon Survey | EOS | 4.1 km | MPC · JPL |
| 336464 | 2008 VC_{2} | — | November 2, 2008 | Socorro | LINEAR | · | 2.0 km | MPC · JPL |
| 336465 Deluna | 2008 VR_{3} | Deluna | November 4, 2008 | Nazaret | Muler, G., Ruiz, J. M. | · | 3.0 km | MPC · JPL |
| 336466 | 2008 VJ_{4} | — | November 4, 2008 | Bisei SG Center | BATTeRS | · | 4.9 km | MPC · JPL |
| 336467 | 2008 VG_{7} | — | November 1, 2008 | Catalina | CSS | EUN | 1.9 km | MPC · JPL |
| 336468 | 2008 VO_{7} | — | November 2, 2008 | Catalina | CSS | · | 2.4 km | MPC · JPL |
| 336469 | 2008 VS_{9} | — | November 2, 2008 | Catalina | CSS | · | 2.2 km | MPC · JPL |
| 336470 | 2008 VQ_{14} | — | November 8, 2008 | Andrushivka | Andrushivka | · | 2.8 km | MPC · JPL |
| 336471 | 2008 VS_{14} | — | November 9, 2008 | La Sagra | OAM | · | 1.4 km | MPC · JPL |
| 336472 | 2008 VX_{19} | — | November 1, 2008 | Mount Lemmon | Mount Lemmon Survey | · | 1.7 km | MPC · JPL |
| 336473 | 2008 VB_{20} | — | November 1, 2008 | Mount Lemmon | Mount Lemmon Survey | KOR | 1.4 km | MPC · JPL |
| 336474 | 2008 VJ_{23} | — | November 1, 2008 | Kitt Peak | Spacewatch | · | 2.2 km | MPC · JPL |
| 336475 | 2008 VF_{24} | — | October 24, 2008 | Kitt Peak | Spacewatch | ADE | 1.8 km | MPC · JPL |
| 336476 | 2008 VA_{27} | — | November 2, 2008 | Kitt Peak | Spacewatch | HOF | 4.3 km | MPC · JPL |
| 336477 | 2008 VD_{27} | — | November 2, 2008 | Kitt Peak | Spacewatch | HOF | 2.8 km | MPC · JPL |
| 336478 | 2008 VO_{27} | — | November 2, 2008 | Kitt Peak | Spacewatch | · | 5.2 km | MPC · JPL |
| 336479 | 2008 VH_{28} | — | November 2, 2008 | Kitt Peak | Spacewatch | AGN | 1.5 km | MPC · JPL |
| 336480 | 2008 VF_{47} | — | November 3, 2008 | Kitt Peak | Spacewatch | · | 2.2 km | MPC · JPL |
| 336481 | 2008 VX_{48} | — | November 3, 2008 | Kitt Peak | Spacewatch | VER | 4.2 km | MPC · JPL |
| 336482 | 2008 VL_{51} | — | November 4, 2008 | Kitt Peak | Spacewatch | · | 3.0 km | MPC · JPL |
| 336483 | 2008 VP_{53} | — | November 6, 2008 | Catalina | CSS | · | 1.6 km | MPC · JPL |
| 336484 | 2008 VH_{55} | — | November 6, 2008 | Mount Lemmon | Mount Lemmon Survey | · | 2.1 km | MPC · JPL |
| 336485 | 2008 VQ_{57} | — | November 6, 2008 | Mount Lemmon | Mount Lemmon Survey | · | 2.7 km | MPC · JPL |
| 336486 | 2008 VU_{58} | — | November 7, 2008 | Mount Lemmon | Mount Lemmon Survey | · | 2.5 km | MPC · JPL |
| 336487 | 2008 VZ_{59} | — | November 7, 2008 | Catalina | CSS | EUN | 1.9 km | MPC · JPL |
| 336488 | 2008 VL_{64} | — | November 10, 2008 | La Sagra | OAM | · | 2.0 km | MPC · JPL |
| 336489 | 2008 WY_{2} | — | November 17, 2008 | Kitt Peak | Spacewatch | · | 2.0 km | MPC · JPL |
| 336490 | 2008 WF_{4} | — | November 17, 2008 | Kitt Peak | Spacewatch | AGN | 1.4 km | MPC · JPL |
| 336491 | 2008 WQ_{10} | — | November 18, 2008 | Catalina | CSS | · | 2.2 km | MPC · JPL |
| 336492 | 2008 WB_{11} | — | November 18, 2008 | Catalina | CSS | · | 2.3 km | MPC · JPL |
| 336493 | 2008 WK_{14} | — | November 17, 2008 | La Sagra | OAM | · | 1.5 km | MPC · JPL |
| 336494 | 2008 WU_{16} | — | November 17, 2008 | Kitt Peak | Spacewatch | · | 1.7 km | MPC · JPL |
| 336495 | 2008 WC_{27} | — | November 19, 2008 | Mount Lemmon | Mount Lemmon Survey | EOS | 3.7 km | MPC · JPL |
| 336496 | 2008 WW_{31} | — | November 19, 2008 | Mount Lemmon | Mount Lemmon Survey | KOR | 1.6 km | MPC · JPL |
| 336497 | 2008 WV_{47} | — | November 17, 2008 | Kitt Peak | Spacewatch | · | 4.3 km | MPC · JPL |
| 336498 | 2008 WU_{48} | — | November 18, 2008 | Catalina | CSS | KOR | 1.5 km | MPC · JPL |
| 336499 | 2008 WL_{53} | — | November 19, 2008 | Kitt Peak | Spacewatch | · | 2.0 km | MPC · JPL |
| 336500 | 2008 WV_{64} | — | November 17, 2008 | Kitt Peak | Spacewatch | NEM | 2.2 km | MPC · JPL |

== 336501–336600 ==
back to top

| Designation | | | Discovery | | | Properties | | Ref |
| Permanent | Provisional | Named after | Date | Site | Discoverer(s) | Category | Diam. | Ref |
|---|---|---|---|---|---|---|---|---|
| 336501 | 2008 WJ_{71} | — | November 19, 2008 | Kitt Peak | Spacewatch | · | 1.9 km | MPC · JPL |
| 336502 | 2008 WQ_{78} | — | November 20, 2008 | Mount Lemmon | Mount Lemmon Survey | EOS | 2.1 km | MPC · JPL |
| 336503 | 2008 WL_{83} | — | November 20, 2008 | Kitt Peak | Spacewatch | AEO | 1.1 km | MPC · JPL |
| 336504 | 2008 WQ_{85} | — | November 20, 2008 | Kitt Peak | Spacewatch | · | 5.0 km | MPC · JPL |
| 336505 | 2008 WD_{108} | — | November 30, 2008 | Kitt Peak | Spacewatch | · | 4.4 km | MPC · JPL |
| 336506 | 2008 WJ_{118} | — | November 30, 2008 | Mount Lemmon | Mount Lemmon Survey | · | 1.9 km | MPC · JPL |
| 336507 | 2008 WR_{121} | — | November 29, 2008 | Bergisch Gladbach | W. Bickel | · | 1.3 km | MPC · JPL |
| 336508 | 2008 WE_{125} | — | November 24, 2008 | Kitt Peak | Spacewatch | · | 4.2 km | MPC · JPL |
| 336509 | 2008 WS_{125} | — | November 24, 2008 | Mount Lemmon | Mount Lemmon Survey | · | 4.5 km | MPC · JPL |
| 336510 | 2008 WD_{129} | — | November 24, 2008 | Mount Lemmon | Mount Lemmon Survey | · | 4.2 km | MPC · JPL |
| 336511 | 2008 WF_{131} | — | November 19, 2008 | Catalina | CSS | EUN | 1.9 km | MPC · JPL |
| 336512 | 2008 WT_{138} | — | November 19, 2008 | Kitt Peak | Spacewatch | · | 2.4 km | MPC · JPL |
| 336513 | 2008 XD_{1} | — | December 1, 2008 | Skylive | Tozzi, F. | · | 2.6 km | MPC · JPL |
| 336514 | 2008 XS_{27} | — | December 4, 2008 | Mount Lemmon | Mount Lemmon Survey | · | 2.5 km | MPC · JPL |
| 336515 | 2008 XU_{40} | — | December 21, 2003 | Socorro | LINEAR | · | 4.9 km | MPC · JPL |
| 336516 | 2008 XT_{47} | — | December 4, 2008 | Mount Lemmon | Mount Lemmon Survey | · | 2.9 km | MPC · JPL |
| 336517 | 2008 XU_{52} | — | December 3, 2008 | Catalina | CSS | (1547) | 2.4 km | MPC · JPL |
| 336518 | 2008 YK_{9} | — | December 23, 2008 | Dauban | Kugel, F. | · | 2.6 km | MPC · JPL |
| 336519 | 2008 YM_{11} | — | December 20, 2008 | Lulin | LUSS | · | 4.2 km | MPC · JPL |
| 336520 | 2008 YJ_{34} | — | December 30, 2008 | Kitt Peak | Spacewatch | · | 4.5 km | MPC · JPL |
| 336521 | 2008 YY_{65} | — | December 31, 2008 | Kitt Peak | Spacewatch | · | 5.1 km | MPC · JPL |
| 336522 | 2008 YM_{66} | — | December 30, 2008 | Mount Lemmon | Mount Lemmon Survey | EUN | 1.4 km | MPC · JPL |
| 336523 | 2008 YF_{78} | — | December 30, 2008 | Mount Lemmon | Mount Lemmon Survey | · | 2.8 km | MPC · JPL |
| 336524 | 2008 YM_{80} | — | December 30, 2008 | Kitt Peak | Spacewatch | slow | 4.3 km | MPC · JPL |
| 336525 | 2008 YU_{87} | — | December 29, 2008 | Kitt Peak | Spacewatch | · | 4.1 km | MPC · JPL |
| 336526 | 2008 YJ_{93} | — | December 29, 2008 | Kitt Peak | Spacewatch | · | 3.8 km | MPC · JPL |
| 336527 | 2008 YW_{95} | — | December 29, 2008 | Kitt Peak | Spacewatch | EOS | 2.6 km | MPC · JPL |
| 336528 | 2008 YE_{116} | — | December 29, 2008 | Kitt Peak | Spacewatch | · | 2.1 km | MPC · JPL |
| 336529 | 2008 YR_{122} | — | December 30, 2008 | Kitt Peak | Spacewatch | · | 4.2 km | MPC · JPL |
| 336530 | 2008 YJ_{135} | — | December 30, 2008 | La Sagra | OAM | TIR | 3.6 km | MPC · JPL |
| 336531 | 2008 YS_{144} | — | December 30, 2008 | Kitt Peak | Spacewatch | · | 5.0 km | MPC · JPL |
| 336532 | 2008 YH_{153} | — | December 21, 2008 | Kitt Peak | Spacewatch | CYB | 3.5 km | MPC · JPL |
| 336533 | 2008 YS_{154} | — | December 22, 2008 | Kitt Peak | Spacewatch | · | 2.2 km | MPC · JPL |
| 336534 | 2008 YO_{156} | — | December 30, 2008 | Mount Lemmon | Mount Lemmon Survey | · | 1.7 km | MPC · JPL |
| 336535 | 2008 YF_{164} | — | December 21, 2008 | Kitt Peak | Spacewatch | · | 2.6 km | MPC · JPL |
| 336536 | 2009 AB_{26} | — | January 2, 2009 | Kitt Peak | Spacewatch | · | 2.7 km | MPC · JPL |
| 336537 | 2009 AL_{28} | — | January 8, 2009 | Kitt Peak | Spacewatch | · | 4.5 km | MPC · JPL |
| 336538 | 2009 AG_{32} | — | January 15, 2009 | Kitt Peak | Spacewatch | · | 2.7 km | MPC · JPL |
| 336539 | 2009 BW_{9} | — | January 20, 2009 | Bergisch Gladbach | W. Bickel | · | 3.4 km | MPC · JPL |
| 336540 | 2009 BD_{25} | — | January 18, 2009 | Kitt Peak | Spacewatch | · | 3.5 km | MPC · JPL |
| 336541 | 2009 BS_{38} | — | January 16, 2009 | Kitt Peak | Spacewatch | 3:2 · SHU | 6.4 km | MPC · JPL |
| 336542 | 2009 BM_{52} | — | January 16, 2009 | Kitt Peak | Spacewatch | · | 3.5 km | MPC · JPL |
| 336543 | 2009 BF_{57} | — | October 12, 2007 | Mount Lemmon | Mount Lemmon Survey | · | 2.8 km | MPC · JPL |
| 336544 | 2009 BF_{63} | — | January 20, 2009 | Kitt Peak | Spacewatch | CYB | 5.3 km | MPC · JPL |
| 336545 | 2009 BF_{96} | — | January 24, 2009 | Purple Mountain | PMO NEO Survey Program | · | 2.3 km | MPC · JPL |
| 336546 | 2009 BP_{97} | — | January 25, 2009 | Catalina | CSS | · | 3.6 km | MPC · JPL |
| 336547 | 2009 BQ_{132} | — | January 30, 2009 | Mount Lemmon | Mount Lemmon Survey | EOS | 2.6 km | MPC · JPL |
| 336548 | 2009 BG_{142} | — | January 30, 2009 | Kitt Peak | Spacewatch | · | 3.7 km | MPC · JPL |
| 336549 | 2009 CT_{33} | — | February 2, 2009 | Kitt Peak | Spacewatch | 3:2 · SHU | 5.9 km | MPC · JPL |
| 336550 | 2009 CM_{45} | — | February 14, 2009 | Kitt Peak | Spacewatch | · | 3.6 km | MPC · JPL |
| 336551 | 2009 CZ_{50} | — | February 14, 2009 | La Sagra | OAM | · | 5.8 km | MPC · JPL |
| 336552 | 2009 DC_{15} | — | February 16, 2009 | La Sagra | OAM | · | 6.2 km | MPC · JPL |
| 336553 | 2009 EY_{27} | — | March 1, 2009 | Catalina | CSS | EUP | 4.7 km | MPC · JPL |
| 336554 | 2009 FP_{39} | — | March 26, 2009 | Kitt Peak | Spacewatch | · | 3.1 km | MPC · JPL |
| 336555 | 2009 JA_{2} | — | May 1, 2009 | Kitt Peak | Spacewatch | L5 | 7.9 km | MPC · JPL |
| 336556 | 2009 KK_{36} | — | May 28, 2009 | Siding Spring | SSS | H | 830 m | MPC · JPL |
| 336557 | 2009 PX_{12} | — | August 15, 2009 | Kitt Peak | Spacewatch | · | 790 m | MPC · JPL |
| 336558 | 2009 RM_{34} | — | September 14, 2009 | Kitt Peak | Spacewatch | · | 1.6 km | MPC · JPL |
| 336559 | 2009 RY_{48} | — | September 15, 2009 | Kitt Peak | Spacewatch | · | 700 m | MPC · JPL |
| 336560 | 2009 RM_{54} | — | September 15, 2009 | Kitt Peak | Spacewatch | · | 650 m | MPC · JPL |
| 336561 | 2009 RF_{66} | — | September 15, 2009 | Kitt Peak | Spacewatch | · | 1.0 km | MPC · JPL |
| 336562 | 2009 SY_{13} | — | September 17, 2009 | Mount Lemmon | Mount Lemmon Survey | · | 640 m | MPC · JPL |
| 336563 | 2009 SL_{19} | — | September 23, 2009 | Mayhill | Lowe, A. | · | 660 m | MPC · JPL |
| 336564 | 2009 SQ_{26} | — | September 16, 2009 | Kitt Peak | Spacewatch | · | 890 m | MPC · JPL |
| 336565 | 2009 SK_{30} | — | September 16, 2009 | Kitt Peak | Spacewatch | · | 720 m | MPC · JPL |
| 336566 | 2009 SJ_{53} | — | September 17, 2009 | Catalina | CSS | · | 1.0 km | MPC · JPL |
| 336567 | 2009 SX_{56} | — | September 17, 2009 | Kitt Peak | Spacewatch | · | 840 m | MPC · JPL |
| 336568 | 2009 SF_{67} | — | September 17, 2009 | Kitt Peak | Spacewatch | · | 740 m | MPC · JPL |
| 336569 | 2009 SV_{111} | — | September 18, 2009 | Kitt Peak | Spacewatch | · | 1.2 km | MPC · JPL |
| 336570 | 2009 SA_{115} | — | September 18, 2009 | Kitt Peak | Spacewatch | · | 580 m | MPC · JPL |
| 336571 | 2009 SB_{125} | — | September 18, 2009 | Kitt Peak | Spacewatch | · | 1.3 km | MPC · JPL |
| 336572 | 2009 SQ_{125} | — | September 18, 2009 | Kitt Peak | Spacewatch | · | 670 m | MPC · JPL |
| 336573 | 2009 SS_{125} | — | September 18, 2009 | Kitt Peak | Spacewatch | · | 800 m | MPC · JPL |
| 336574 | 2009 SU_{127} | — | September 18, 2009 | Kitt Peak | Spacewatch | · | 870 m | MPC · JPL |
| 336575 | 2009 SM_{129} | — | September 18, 2009 | Kitt Peak | Spacewatch | · | 1.4 km | MPC · JPL |
| 336576 | 2009 SB_{138} | — | September 18, 2009 | Kitt Peak | Spacewatch | · | 670 m | MPC · JPL |
| 336577 | 2009 SR_{172} | — | September 20, 2009 | Mount Lemmon | Mount Lemmon Survey | · | 690 m | MPC · JPL |
| 336578 | 2009 SB_{173} | — | January 18, 2004 | Palomar | NEAT | · | 960 m | MPC · JPL |
| 336579 | 2009 SL_{183} | — | September 21, 2009 | Kitt Peak | Spacewatch | V | 820 m | MPC · JPL |
| 336580 | 2009 SY_{185} | — | September 21, 2009 | Kitt Peak | Spacewatch | · | 1 km | MPC · JPL |
| 336581 | 2009 SO_{186} | — | September 21, 2009 | Kitt Peak | Spacewatch | NYS | 1.4 km | MPC · JPL |
| 336582 | 2009 SG_{267} | — | August 31, 2005 | Kitt Peak | Spacewatch | · | 1.5 km | MPC · JPL |
| 336583 | 2009 SG_{290} | — | September 25, 2009 | Kitt Peak | Spacewatch | · | 660 m | MPC · JPL |
| 336584 | 2009 SD_{328} | — | September 26, 2009 | Kitt Peak | Spacewatch | · | 710 m | MPC · JPL |
| 336585 | 2009 SW_{339} | — | September 22, 2009 | Mount Lemmon | Mount Lemmon Survey | URS | 5.5 km | MPC · JPL |
| 336586 | 2009 SV_{343} | — | September 17, 2009 | Kitt Peak | Spacewatch | · | 660 m | MPC · JPL |
| 336587 | 2009 SX_{346} | — | September 25, 2009 | Kitt Peak | Spacewatch | · | 660 m | MPC · JPL |
| 336588 | 2009 SK_{355} | — | September 21, 2009 | Mount Lemmon | Mount Lemmon Survey | V | 680 m | MPC · JPL |
| 336589 | 2009 SP_{356} | — | September 17, 2009 | Mount Lemmon | Mount Lemmon Survey | · | 1.1 km | MPC · JPL |
| 336590 | 2009 SZ_{358} | — | September 20, 2009 | Mount Lemmon | Mount Lemmon Survey | V | 810 m | MPC · JPL |
| 336591 | 2009 SM_{360} | — | September 28, 2009 | Mount Lemmon | Mount Lemmon Survey | · | 810 m | MPC · JPL |
| 336592 | 2009 SZ_{361} | — | September 18, 2009 | Kitt Peak | Spacewatch | · | 4.5 km | MPC · JPL |
| 336593 | 2009 SH_{364} | — | September 28, 2009 | Mount Lemmon | Mount Lemmon Survey | · | 1.0 km | MPC · JPL |
| 336594 | 2009 TY_{1} | — | October 10, 2009 | La Sagra | OAM | · | 780 m | MPC · JPL |
| 336595 | 2009 TJ_{9} | — | October 14, 2009 | La Sagra | OAM | · | 730 m | MPC · JPL |
| 336596 | 2009 TX_{13} | — | October 10, 2009 | Catalina | CSS | · | 880 m | MPC · JPL |
| 336597 | 2009 TF_{14} | — | October 11, 2009 | Mount Lemmon | Mount Lemmon Survey | · | 620 m | MPC · JPL |
| 336598 | 2009 TE_{21} | — | October 11, 2009 | La Sagra | OAM | · | 830 m | MPC · JPL |
| 336599 | 2009 TB_{28} | — | October 15, 2009 | La Sagra | OAM | · | 1.1 km | MPC · JPL |
| 336600 | 2009 TW_{35} | — | May 14, 2008 | Mount Lemmon | Mount Lemmon Survey | · | 770 m | MPC · JPL |

== 336601–336700 ==
back to top

| Designation | | | Discovery | | | Properties | | Ref |
| Permanent | Provisional | Named after | Date | Site | Discoverer(s) | Category | Diam. | Ref |
|---|---|---|---|---|---|---|---|---|
| 336601 | 2009 TQ_{39} | — | October 14, 2009 | Catalina | CSS | · | 710 m | MPC · JPL |
| 336602 | 2009 TY_{42} | — | October 12, 2009 | Mount Lemmon | Mount Lemmon Survey | · | 1.3 km | MPC · JPL |
| 336603 | 2009 TS_{47} | — | October 2, 2009 | Mount Lemmon | Mount Lemmon Survey | · | 610 m | MPC · JPL |
| 336604 | 2009 UL_{5} | — | October 18, 2009 | Vicques | M. Ory | · | 1.1 km | MPC · JPL |
| 336605 | 2009 UM_{5} | — | October 20, 2009 | Vicques | M. Ory | · | 2.6 km | MPC · JPL |
| 336606 | 2009 UX_{26} | — | October 21, 2009 | Catalina | CSS | · | 830 m | MPC · JPL |
| 336607 | 2009 UT_{38} | — | October 22, 2009 | Mount Lemmon | Mount Lemmon Survey | V | 820 m | MPC · JPL |
| 336608 | 2009 UD_{51} | — | October 22, 2009 | Catalina | CSS | · | 1.8 km | MPC · JPL |
| 336609 | 2009 UV_{56} | — | August 31, 2005 | Kitt Peak | Spacewatch | · | 1.2 km | MPC · JPL |
| 336610 | 2009 UT_{58} | — | October 23, 2009 | Mount Lemmon | Mount Lemmon Survey | · | 670 m | MPC · JPL |
| 336611 | 2009 UK_{87} | — | October 24, 2009 | Catalina | CSS | · | 780 m | MPC · JPL |
| 336612 | 2009 UL_{94} | — | October 21, 2009 | Kachina | Hobart, J. | · | 650 m | MPC · JPL |
| 336613 | 2009 UZ_{117} | — | October 22, 2009 | Catalina | CSS | · | 760 m | MPC · JPL |
| 336614 | 2009 UC_{140} | — | October 16, 2009 | Mount Lemmon | Mount Lemmon Survey | · | 780 m | MPC · JPL |
| 336615 | 2009 VP_{2} | — | November 9, 2009 | Socorro | LINEAR | · | 4.1 km | MPC · JPL |
| 336616 | 2009 VB_{23} | — | November 9, 2009 | Mount Lemmon | Mount Lemmon Survey | · | 2.2 km | MPC · JPL |
| 336617 | 2009 VP_{23} | — | November 9, 2009 | Catalina | CSS | · | 1.7 km | MPC · JPL |
| 336618 | 2009 VV_{23} | — | November 9, 2009 | Mount Lemmon | Mount Lemmon Survey | ADE | 2.4 km | MPC · JPL |
| 336619 | 2009 VH_{40} | — | November 8, 2009 | Catalina | CSS | · | 830 m | MPC · JPL |
| 336620 | 2009 VA_{41} | — | November 8, 2009 | Kitt Peak | Spacewatch | · | 1.7 km | MPC · JPL |
| 336621 | 2009 VH_{45} | — | November 11, 2009 | Socorro | LINEAR | · | 970 m | MPC · JPL |
| 336622 | 2009 VJ_{49} | — | November 11, 2009 | Kitt Peak | Spacewatch | · | 1.2 km | MPC · JPL |
| 336623 | 2009 VK_{49} | — | December 21, 2006 | Kitt Peak | Spacewatch | · | 720 m | MPC · JPL |
| 336624 | 2009 VO_{55} | — | November 11, 2009 | Kitt Peak | Spacewatch | · | 970 m | MPC · JPL |
| 336625 | 2009 VO_{58} | — | November 15, 2009 | Catalina | CSS | · | 970 m | MPC · JPL |
| 336626 | 2009 VG_{63} | — | October 26, 2009 | Mount Lemmon | Mount Lemmon Survey | · | 2.0 km | MPC · JPL |
| 336627 | 2009 VO_{66} | — | November 9, 2009 | Kitt Peak | Spacewatch | · | 780 m | MPC · JPL |
| 336628 | 2009 VF_{75} | — | November 12, 2009 | La Sagra | OAM | · | 1.8 km | MPC · JPL |
| 336629 | 2009 VG_{88} | — | November 10, 2009 | Kitt Peak | Spacewatch | · | 1.5 km | MPC · JPL |
| 336630 | 2009 VJ_{103} | — | November 11, 2009 | Mount Lemmon | Mount Lemmon Survey | EUN | 1.4 km | MPC · JPL |
| 336631 | 2009 VK_{103} | — | November 11, 2009 | Mount Lemmon | Mount Lemmon Survey | V | 790 m | MPC · JPL |
| 336632 | 2009 VV_{105} | — | November 10, 2009 | La Sagra | OAM | · | 960 m | MPC · JPL |
| 336633 | 2009 VO_{114} | — | November 11, 2009 | Mount Lemmon | Mount Lemmon Survey | · | 970 m | MPC · JPL |
| 336634 | 2009 WE_{20} | — | November 17, 2009 | Mount Lemmon | Mount Lemmon Survey | V | 650 m | MPC · JPL |
| 336635 | 2009 WJ_{20} | — | November 17, 2009 | Mount Lemmon | Mount Lemmon Survey | · | 1.8 km | MPC · JPL |
| 336636 | 2009 WE_{29} | — | November 16, 2009 | Kitt Peak | Spacewatch | · | 690 m | MPC · JPL |
| 336637 | 2009 WD_{35} | — | November 16, 2009 | La Sagra | OAM | · | 1.3 km | MPC · JPL |
| 336638 | 2009 WL_{43} | — | November 17, 2009 | Kitt Peak | Spacewatch | MAS | 680 m | MPC · JPL |
| 336639 | 2009 WY_{43} | — | November 17, 2009 | Mount Lemmon | Mount Lemmon Survey | · | 2.1 km | MPC · JPL |
| 336640 | 2009 WF_{46} | — | November 18, 2009 | Kitt Peak | Spacewatch | V | 900 m | MPC · JPL |
| 336641 | 2009 WY_{74} | — | November 18, 2009 | Kitt Peak | Spacewatch | BAP | 710 m | MPC · JPL |
| 336642 | 2009 WR_{77} | — | November 18, 2009 | Kitt Peak | Spacewatch | · | 1.1 km | MPC · JPL |
| 336643 | 2009 WP_{87} | — | November 19, 2009 | Kitt Peak | Spacewatch | V | 840 m | MPC · JPL |
| 336644 | 2009 WB_{98} | — | November 21, 2009 | Kitt Peak | Spacewatch | · | 920 m | MPC · JPL |
| 336645 | 2009 WV_{116} | — | November 20, 2009 | Kitt Peak | Spacewatch | · | 1.1 km | MPC · JPL |
| 336646 | 2009 WY_{163} | — | November 21, 2009 | Kitt Peak | Spacewatch | · | 1.7 km | MPC · JPL |
| 336647 | 2009 WZ_{164} | — | November 21, 2009 | Kitt Peak | Spacewatch | · | 1.0 km | MPC · JPL |
| 336648 | 2009 WY_{165} | — | December 14, 2002 | Apache Point | SDSS | · | 1.4 km | MPC · JPL |
| 336649 | 2009 WT_{206} | — | November 17, 2009 | Kitt Peak | Spacewatch | NYS | 810 m | MPC · JPL |
| 336650 | 2009 WA_{218} | — | November 17, 2009 | Catalina | CSS | (2076) | 1.0 km | MPC · JPL |
| 336651 | 2009 WL_{259} | — | November 18, 2009 | Mount Lemmon | Mount Lemmon Survey | · | 2.8 km | MPC · JPL |
| 336652 | 2009 WP_{259} | — | November 21, 2009 | Mount Lemmon | Mount Lemmon Survey | · | 2.1 km | MPC · JPL |
| 336653 | 2009 WS_{263} | — | November 21, 2009 | Mount Lemmon | Mount Lemmon Survey | NYS | 1.1 km | MPC · JPL |
| 336654 | 2009 XX_{2} | — | December 12, 2009 | Mayhill | Mayhill | NYS | 1.1 km | MPC · JPL |
| 336655 | 2009 XC_{7} | — | December 9, 2009 | Socorro | LINEAR | · | 1.7 km | MPC · JPL |
| 336656 | 2009 XW_{18} | — | December 15, 2009 | Mount Lemmon | Mount Lemmon Survey | · | 2.4 km | MPC · JPL |
| 336657 | 2009 XX_{18} | — | December 15, 2009 | Mount Lemmon | Mount Lemmon Survey | · | 2.6 km | MPC · JPL |
| 336658 | 2009 XN_{19} | — | September 18, 2009 | Kitt Peak | Spacewatch | · | 2.1 km | MPC · JPL |
| 336659 | 2009 XP_{21} | — | November 10, 2009 | Mount Lemmon | Mount Lemmon Survey | · | 2.7 km | MPC · JPL |
| 336660 | 2009 XF_{24} | — | December 12, 2009 | Socorro | LINEAR | EUN | 2.0 km | MPC · JPL |
| 336661 | 2009 XJ_{24} | — | December 13, 2009 | Socorro | LINEAR | · | 840 m | MPC · JPL |
| 336662 | 2009 XV_{24} | — | December 15, 2009 | Socorro | LINEAR | · | 1.1 km | MPC · JPL |
| 336663 | 2009 YH_{2} | — | September 5, 2008 | Kitt Peak | Spacewatch | · | 1.6 km | MPC · JPL |
| 336664 | 2009 YG_{13} | — | December 18, 2009 | Mount Lemmon | Mount Lemmon Survey | · | 4.4 km | MPC · JPL |
| 336665 | 2009 YY_{13} | — | September 28, 2009 | Kitt Peak | Spacewatch | · | 4.2 km | MPC · JPL |
| 336666 | 2009 YR_{17} | — | December 20, 2009 | Kitt Peak | Spacewatch | · | 4.6 km | MPC · JPL |
| 336667 | 2009 YY_{19} | — | December 25, 2009 | Kitt Peak | Spacewatch | · | 2.5 km | MPC · JPL |
| 336668 | 2009 YS_{22} | — | December 18, 2009 | Mount Lemmon | Mount Lemmon Survey | · | 2.0 km | MPC · JPL |
| 336669 | 2009 YN_{24} | — | December 18, 2009 | Mount Lemmon | Mount Lemmon Survey | · | 1.4 km | MPC · JPL |
| 336670 | 2009 YZ_{24} | — | December 19, 2009 | Kitt Peak | Spacewatch | · | 2.0 km | MPC · JPL |
| 336671 | 2009 YS_{25} | — | December 18, 2009 | Mount Lemmon | Mount Lemmon Survey | · | 3.7 km | MPC · JPL |
| 336672 | 2010 AW_{7} | — | January 6, 2010 | Kitt Peak | Spacewatch | · | 4.2 km | MPC · JPL |
| 336673 | 2010 AY_{18} | — | January 7, 2010 | Mount Lemmon | Mount Lemmon Survey | · | 2.2 km | MPC · JPL |
| 336674 | 2010 AK_{24} | — | January 6, 2010 | Kitt Peak | Spacewatch | · | 4.7 km | MPC · JPL |
| 336675 | 2010 AP_{26} | — | February 24, 2006 | Kitt Peak | Spacewatch | NEM | 2.2 km | MPC · JPL |
| 336676 | 2010 AY_{31} | — | January 6, 2010 | Kitt Peak | Spacewatch | · | 1.5 km | MPC · JPL |
| 336677 | 2010 AF_{32} | — | January 6, 2010 | Kitt Peak | Spacewatch | · | 1.1 km | MPC · JPL |
| 336678 | 2010 AR_{37} | — | January 7, 2010 | Kitt Peak | Spacewatch | AEO | 1.4 km | MPC · JPL |
| 336679 | 2010 AM_{39} | — | January 10, 2010 | Málaga | Malaga | BAR | 1.8 km | MPC · JPL |
| 336680 Pavolpaulík | 2010 AQ_{39} | Pavolpaulík | January 10, 2010 | Mayhill | Kurti, S. | · | 900 m | MPC · JPL |
| 336681 | 2010 AB_{44} | — | January 7, 2010 | Kitt Peak | Spacewatch | · | 3.0 km | MPC · JPL |
| 336682 | 2010 AC_{44} | — | January 7, 2010 | Kitt Peak | Spacewatch | KON | 3.0 km | MPC · JPL |
| 336683 | 2010 AA_{55} | — | January 8, 2010 | Kitt Peak | Spacewatch | (5) | 1.2 km | MPC · JPL |
| 336684 | 2010 AF_{56} | — | January 8, 2010 | Kitt Peak | Spacewatch | EOS | 3.1 km | MPC · JPL |
| 336685 | 2010 AK_{59} | — | January 6, 2010 | Catalina | CSS | · | 2.4 km | MPC · JPL |
| 336686 | 2010 AU_{59} | — | January 6, 2010 | Catalina | CSS | · | 2.4 km | MPC · JPL |
| 336687 | 2010 AB_{64} | — | January 10, 2010 | Kitt Peak | Spacewatch | · | 2.2 km | MPC · JPL |
| 336688 | 2010 AU_{66} | — | November 3, 2008 | Mount Lemmon | Mount Lemmon Survey | · | 2.1 km | MPC · JPL |
| 336689 | 2010 AF_{72} | — | January 13, 2010 | Mount Lemmon | Mount Lemmon Survey | · | 2.4 km | MPC · JPL |
| 336690 | 2010 AE_{75} | — | January 7, 2010 | Socorro | LINEAR | ERI | 2.4 km | MPC · JPL |
| 336691 | 2010 AW_{79} | — | January 13, 2010 | Mount Lemmon | Mount Lemmon Survey | · | 2.8 km | MPC · JPL |
| 336692 | 2010 AD_{80} | — | January 8, 2010 | Kitt Peak | Spacewatch | · | 5.5 km | MPC · JPL |
| 336693 | 2010 AA_{81} | — | January 12, 2010 | Mount Lemmon | Mount Lemmon Survey | ADE | 3.5 km | MPC · JPL |
| 336694 Fey | 2010 AH_{89} | Fey | January 8, 2010 | WISE | WISE | VER | 4.4 km | MPC · JPL |
| 336695 | 2010 AN_{103} | — | May 3, 2005 | Kitt Peak | Spacewatch | · | 4.3 km | MPC · JPL |
| 336696 | 2010 BZ_{1} | — | January 18, 2010 | Dauban | Kugel, F. | GEF | 1.4 km | MPC · JPL |
| 336697 | 2010 BG_{53} | — | January 20, 2010 | WISE | WISE | · | 4.7 km | MPC · JPL |
| 336698 Melbourne | 2010 CJ | Melbourne | February 5, 2010 | Tzec Maun | E. Schwab | · | 3.9 km | MPC · JPL |
| 336699 | 2010 CG_{1} | — | February 6, 2010 | Socorro | LINEAR | · | 5.0 km | MPC · JPL |
| 336700 | 2010 CK_{28} | — | December 20, 2004 | Mount Lemmon | Mount Lemmon Survey | · | 4.1 km | MPC · JPL |

== 336701–336800 ==
back to top

| Designation | | | Discovery | | | Properties | | Ref |
| Permanent | Provisional | Named after | Date | Site | Discoverer(s) | Category | Diam. | Ref |
|---|---|---|---|---|---|---|---|---|
| 336701 | 2010 CP_{32} | — | February 10, 2010 | Kitt Peak | Spacewatch | · | 2.7 km | MPC · JPL |
| 336702 | 2010 CN_{39} | — | February 13, 2010 | Mount Lemmon | Mount Lemmon Survey | HYG | 3.4 km | MPC · JPL |
| 336703 | 2010 CU_{41} | — | December 20, 2009 | Mount Lemmon | Mount Lemmon Survey | · | 5.2 km | MPC · JPL |
| 336704 | 2010 CR_{43} | — | February 5, 2010 | Catalina | CSS | EUN | 2.8 km | MPC · JPL |
| 336705 | 2010 CG_{56} | — | February 12, 2010 | Socorro | LINEAR | · | 2.2 km | MPC · JPL |
| 336706 | 2010 CD_{60} | — | January 27, 2004 | Anderson Mesa | LONEOS | · | 4.8 km | MPC · JPL |
| 336707 | 2010 CR_{70} | — | August 26, 2008 | La Sagra | OAM | EUN | 1.4 km | MPC · JPL |
| 336708 | 2010 CY_{74} | — | February 16, 2001 | Kitt Peak | Spacewatch | · | 2.0 km | MPC · JPL |
| 336709 | 2010 CJ_{85} | — | February 14, 2010 | Kitt Peak | Spacewatch | THM | 3.7 km | MPC · JPL |
| 336710 | 2010 CE_{99} | — | February 14, 2010 | Kitt Peak | Spacewatch | · | 2.0 km | MPC · JPL |
| 336711 | 2010 CD_{100} | — | March 24, 2006 | Kitt Peak | Spacewatch | · | 1.9 km | MPC · JPL |
| 336712 | 2010 CQ_{120} | — | February 15, 2010 | Catalina | CSS | · | 5.6 km | MPC · JPL |
| 336713 | 2010 CF_{127} | — | February 15, 2010 | Kitt Peak | Spacewatch | SYL · CYB | 5.7 km | MPC · JPL |
| 336714 | 2010 CG_{127} | — | February 15, 2010 | Kitt Peak | Spacewatch | HYG | 4.7 km | MPC · JPL |
| 336715 | 2010 CN_{129} | — | February 13, 2010 | Catalina | CSS | · | 2.5 km | MPC · JPL |
| 336716 | 2010 CP_{137} | — | August 10, 2007 | Kitt Peak | Spacewatch | · | 2.1 km | MPC · JPL |
| 336717 | 2010 CE_{139} | — | September 11, 2007 | Kitt Peak | Spacewatch | · | 2.5 km | MPC · JPL |
| 336718 | 2010 CZ_{142} | — | January 28, 2000 | Kitt Peak | Spacewatch | TRE | 3.6 km | MPC · JPL |
| 336719 | 2010 CO_{149} | — | September 30, 2003 | Kitt Peak | Spacewatch | HOF | 3.6 km | MPC · JPL |
| 336720 | 2010 CK_{154} | — | February 15, 2010 | Kitt Peak | Spacewatch | · | 2.9 km | MPC · JPL |
| 336721 | 2010 CM_{159} | — | February 15, 2010 | Kitt Peak | Spacewatch | · | 3.2 km | MPC · JPL |
| 336722 | 2010 CW_{171} | — | January 22, 2006 | Mount Lemmon | Mount Lemmon Survey | · | 2.4 km | MPC · JPL |
| 336723 | 2010 CD_{180} | — | September 4, 2003 | Kitt Peak | Spacewatch | · | 2.6 km | MPC · JPL |
| 336724 | 2010 DP_{8} | — | February 16, 2010 | Kitt Peak | Spacewatch | VER | 4.6 km | MPC · JPL |
| 336725 | 2010 DE_{31} | — | February 20, 2010 | WISE | WISE | · | 4.9 km | MPC · JPL |
| 336726 | 2010 DW_{34} | — | January 28, 1998 | Kitt Peak | Spacewatch | · | 1.1 km | MPC · JPL |
| 336727 | 2010 DR_{43} | — | February 17, 2010 | Kitt Peak | Spacewatch | · | 3.1 km | MPC · JPL |
| 336728 | 2010 DD_{75} | — | May 22, 2001 | Cerro Tololo | Deep Ecliptic Survey | · | 2.9 km | MPC · JPL |
| 336729 | 2010 DE_{76} | — | December 28, 2005 | Mount Lemmon | Mount Lemmon Survey | MAS | 820 m | MPC · JPL |
| 336730 | 2010 DL_{77} | — | February 18, 2010 | Mount Lemmon | Mount Lemmon Survey | · | 3.7 km | MPC · JPL |
| 336731 | 2010 DO_{78} | — | February 16, 2010 | Catalina | CSS | · | 3.5 km | MPC · JPL |
| 336732 | 2010 EA_{14} | — | August 7, 2004 | Siding Spring | SSS | · | 3.7 km | MPC · JPL |
| 336733 | 2010 EW_{21} | — | March 9, 2010 | Vail-Jarnac | Jarnac | HYG | 3.9 km | MPC · JPL |
| 336734 | 2010 EG_{35} | — | March 20, 1999 | Apache Point | SDSS | · | 3.7 km | MPC · JPL |
| 336735 | 2010 EG_{36} | — | March 11, 2010 | Siding Spring | SSS | (895) | 5.7 km | MPC · JPL |
| 336736 | 2010 EK_{45} | — | March 14, 2010 | Dauban | Kugel, F. | ANF | 2.0 km | MPC · JPL |
| 336737 | 2010 EE_{72} | — | April 19, 2006 | Kitt Peak | Spacewatch | · | 2.0 km | MPC · JPL |
| 336738 | 2010 EV_{86} | — | October 9, 2007 | Kitt Peak | Spacewatch | · | 3.3 km | MPC · JPL |
| 336739 | 2010 EU_{104} | — | March 13, 2010 | Catalina | CSS | EOS | 3.4 km | MPC · JPL |
| 336740 | 2010 EA_{108} | — | March 13, 2010 | Kitt Peak | Spacewatch | · | 4.7 km | MPC · JPL |
| 336741 | 2010 EX_{132} | — | June 13, 2005 | Kitt Peak | Spacewatch | · | 3.8 km | MPC · JPL |
| 336742 | 2010 ET_{136} | — | March 12, 2010 | Kitt Peak | Spacewatch | · | 3.6 km | MPC · JPL |
| 336743 | 2010 FL_{15} | — | March 18, 2010 | Kitt Peak | Spacewatch | · | 2.4 km | MPC · JPL |
| 336744 | 2010 FW_{24} | — | March 18, 2010 | Mount Lemmon | Mount Lemmon Survey | · | 3.8 km | MPC · JPL |
| 336745 | 2010 FN_{29} | — | April 14, 2005 | Kitt Peak | Spacewatch | EOS | 2.0 km | MPC · JPL |
| 336746 | 2010 FL_{30} | — | May 4, 2005 | Kitt Peak | Spacewatch | · | 2.8 km | MPC · JPL |
| 336747 | 2010 FD_{81} | — | March 25, 2010 | Kitt Peak | Spacewatch | EOS | 2.5 km | MPC · JPL |
| 336748 | 2010 FG_{100} | — | March 25, 2010 | Kitt Peak | Spacewatch | EOS | 1.9 km | MPC · JPL |
| 336749 | 2010 GT_{101} | — | September 18, 2003 | Kitt Peak | Spacewatch | · | 1.7 km | MPC · JPL |
| 336750 | 2010 GM_{104} | — | October 30, 2002 | Kitt Peak | Spacewatch | · | 2.4 km | MPC · JPL |
| 336751 | 2010 GE_{116} | — | April 10, 2010 | Mount Lemmon | Mount Lemmon Survey | · | 4.2 km | MPC · JPL |
| 336752 | 2010 HQ_{61} | — | September 7, 2000 | Kitt Peak | Spacewatch | KON | 2.6 km | MPC · JPL |
| 336753 | 2010 HK_{85} | — | April 28, 2010 | WISE | WISE | · | 4.4 km | MPC · JPL |
| 336754 | 2010 KK_{63} | — | May 23, 2010 | WISE | WISE | 3:2 · SHU | 4.7 km | MPC · JPL |
| 336755 | 2010 KA_{95} | — | May 27, 2010 | WISE | WISE | EOS | 3.5 km | MPC · JPL |
| 336756 | 2010 NV_{1} | — | July 7, 2010 | Kitt Peak | Spacewatch | centaur | 44 km | MPC · JPL |
| 336757 | 2010 QU_{4} | — | March 19, 2004 | Siding Spring | SSS | H | 640 m | MPC · JPL |
| 336758 | 2010 QQ_{5} | — | August 18, 2010 | Purple Mountain | PMO NEO Survey Program | · | 2.3 km | MPC · JPL |
| 336759 | 2010 UD_{5} | — | March 8, 2008 | Kitt Peak | Spacewatch | · | 1.9 km | MPC · JPL |
| 336760 | 2010 UM_{9} | — | April 4, 2008 | Kitt Peak | Spacewatch | · | 2.1 km | MPC · JPL |
| 336761 | 2011 AP_{4} | — | November 11, 2007 | Siding Spring | SSS | H | 800 m | MPC · JPL |
| 336762 | 2011 AG_{27} | — | December 31, 1997 | Chichibu | N. Satō | H | 820 m | MPC · JPL |
| 336763 | 2011 AD_{36} | — | February 17, 2004 | Socorro | LINEAR | · | 1.2 km | MPC · JPL |
| 336764 | 2011 AX_{56} | — | March 1, 2004 | Kitt Peak | Spacewatch | MAS | 760 m | MPC · JPL |
| 336765 | 2011 AA_{57} | — | August 31, 2003 | Haleakala | NEAT | · | 2.7 km | MPC · JPL |
| 336766 | 2011 AX_{77} | — | October 22, 2006 | Mount Lemmon | Mount Lemmon Survey | · | 2.2 km | MPC · JPL |
| 336767 | 2011 BU_{19} | — | April 17, 1993 | Kitt Peak | Spacewatch | NYS | 1.0 km | MPC · JPL |
| 336768 | 2011 BH_{20} | — | October 11, 1996 | Kitt Peak | Spacewatch | · | 810 m | MPC · JPL |
| 336769 | 2011 BV_{22} | — | December 30, 1999 | Socorro | LINEAR | H | 750 m | MPC · JPL |
| 336770 | 2011 BM_{38} | — | January 15, 2007 | Anderson Mesa | LONEOS | · | 1.8 km | MPC · JPL |
| 336771 | 2011 BE_{40} | — | January 5, 2006 | Kitt Peak | Spacewatch | H | 850 m | MPC · JPL |
| 336772 | 2011 BU_{50} | — | February 11, 2004 | Palomar | NEAT | · | 980 m | MPC · JPL |
| 336773 | 2011 BB_{54} | — | February 19, 2001 | Socorro | LINEAR | · | 1.1 km | MPC · JPL |
| 336774 | 2011 BC_{63} | — | March 12, 2010 | WISE | WISE | · | 4.7 km | MPC · JPL |
| 336775 | 2011 BG_{64} | — | August 30, 2005 | Palomar | NEAT | · | 1.5 km | MPC · JPL |
| 336776 | 2011 BG_{85} | — | December 9, 2006 | Kitt Peak | Spacewatch | PHO | 1.5 km | MPC · JPL |
| 336777 | 2011 BQ_{88} | — | August 25, 2004 | Kitt Peak | Spacewatch | · | 1.9 km | MPC · JPL |
| 336778 | 2011 BB_{106} | — | February 12, 2008 | Mount Lemmon | Mount Lemmon Survey | · | 810 m | MPC · JPL |
| 336779 | 2011 BL_{107} | — | September 16, 2009 | Mount Lemmon | Mount Lemmon Survey | · | 900 m | MPC · JPL |
| 336780 | 2011 BV_{109} | — | August 16, 2002 | Palomar | NEAT | · | 690 m | MPC · JPL |
| 336781 | 2011 BX_{124} | — | April 5, 2008 | Kitt Peak | Spacewatch | MAS | 740 m | MPC · JPL |
| 336782 | 2011 CA_{3} | — | March 22, 2004 | Socorro | LINEAR | · | 1.6 km | MPC · JPL |
| 336783 | 2011 CS_{16} | — | September 29, 2005 | Mount Lemmon | Mount Lemmon Survey | · | 1.3 km | MPC · JPL |
| 336784 | 2011 CV_{17} | — | December 24, 2006 | Kitt Peak | Spacewatch | · | 1.7 km | MPC · JPL |
| 336785 | 2011 CV_{18} | — | February 26, 2007 | Mount Lemmon | Mount Lemmon Survey | BRG | 1.9 km | MPC · JPL |
| 336786 | 2011 CZ_{21} | — | October 15, 2007 | Catalina | CSS | H | 680 m | MPC · JPL |
| 336787 | 2011 CK_{28} | — | April 13, 2000 | Haleakala | NEAT | · | 2.0 km | MPC · JPL |
| 336788 | 2011 CV_{32} | — | July 30, 2005 | Palomar | NEAT | · | 1.2 km | MPC · JPL |
| 336789 | 2011 CC_{47} | — | September 9, 2004 | Kitt Peak | Spacewatch | · | 2.3 km | MPC · JPL |
| 336790 | 2011 CD_{47} | — | May 10, 2000 | Anderson Mesa | LONEOS | H | 900 m | MPC · JPL |
| 336791 | 2011 CR_{54} | — | March 10, 2008 | Kitt Peak | Spacewatch | · | 660 m | MPC · JPL |
| 336792 | 2011 CZ_{56} | — | August 17, 2009 | Kitt Peak | Spacewatch | · | 770 m | MPC · JPL |
| 336793 | 2011 CM_{57} | — | March 28, 2008 | Mount Lemmon | Mount Lemmon Survey | · | 680 m | MPC · JPL |
| 336794 | 2011 CL_{71} | — | August 10, 1994 | La Silla | E. W. Elst | H | 650 m | MPC · JPL |
| 336795 | 2011 CU_{72} | — | June 18, 2005 | Mount Lemmon | Mount Lemmon Survey | · | 1.0 km | MPC · JPL |
| 336796 | 2011 CB_{74} | — | March 20, 2007 | Anderson Mesa | LONEOS | JUN | 1.4 km | MPC · JPL |
| 336797 | 2011 CS_{75} | — | September 15, 2009 | Kitt Peak | Spacewatch | · | 870 m | MPC · JPL |
| 336798 | 2011 CM_{79} | — | January 8, 2007 | Kitt Peak | Spacewatch | · | 1 km | MPC · JPL |
| 336799 | 2011 CK_{81} | — | March 16, 2004 | Kitt Peak | Spacewatch | · | 1.3 km | MPC · JPL |
| 336800 | 2011 CK_{85} | — | March 20, 2007 | Catalina | CSS | · | 1.5 km | MPC · JPL |

== 336801–336900 ==
back to top

| Designation | | | Discovery | | | Properties | | Ref |
| Permanent | Provisional | Named after | Date | Site | Discoverer(s) | Category | Diam. | Ref |
|---|---|---|---|---|---|---|---|---|
| 336801 | 2011 CL_{91} | — | July 30, 2008 | Mount Lemmon | Mount Lemmon Survey | · | 1.2 km | MPC · JPL |
| 336802 | 2011 CK_{93} | — | April 22, 2004 | Kitt Peak | Spacewatch | · | 1.2 km | MPC · JPL |
| 336803 | 2011 CH_{111} | — | July 31, 2005 | Palomar | NEAT | · | 920 m | MPC · JPL |
| 336804 | 2011 DR_{2} | — | November 17, 2006 | Kitt Peak | Spacewatch | · | 730 m | MPC · JPL |
| 336805 | 2011 DV_{2} | — | June 13, 2005 | Mount Lemmon | Mount Lemmon Survey | · | 820 m | MPC · JPL |
| 336806 | 2011 DE_{8} | — | September 28, 2008 | Socorro | LINEAR | · | 1.9 km | MPC · JPL |
| 336807 | 2011 DS_{8} | — | February 22, 2011 | Kitt Peak | Spacewatch | · | 2.7 km | MPC · JPL |
| 336808 | 2011 DA_{10} | — | November 9, 2009 | Kitt Peak | Spacewatch | RAF | 1.3 km | MPC · JPL |
| 336809 | 2011 DP_{14} | — | March 4, 2008 | Kitt Peak | Spacewatch | · | 710 m | MPC · JPL |
| 336810 | 2011 DS_{18} | — | March 15, 2004 | Socorro | LINEAR | · | 950 m | MPC · JPL |
| 336811 Baratoux | 2011 DL_{21} | Baratoux | August 23, 2001 | Pic du Midi | Observatoire du Pic du Midi | · | 1.5 km | MPC · JPL |
| 336812 | 2011 DN_{21} | — | September 7, 2004 | Kitt Peak | Spacewatch | EUN | 1.4 km | MPC · JPL |
| 336813 | 2011 DW_{24} | — | November 1, 2005 | Mount Lemmon | Mount Lemmon Survey | NYS | 1.6 km | MPC · JPL |
| 336814 | 2011 DA_{42} | — | October 14, 1993 | Kitt Peak | Spacewatch | · | 2.1 km | MPC · JPL |
| 336815 | 2011 EW | — | January 10, 2007 | Kitt Peak | Spacewatch | · | 1.7 km | MPC · JPL |
| 336816 | 2011 ED_{5} | — | August 4, 2005 | Palomar | NEAT | · | 870 m | MPC · JPL |
| 336817 | 2011 EY_{10} | — | November 9, 2006 | Kitt Peak | Spacewatch | · | 750 m | MPC · JPL |
| 336818 | 2011 EH_{19} | — | March 20, 1999 | Apache Point | SDSS | · | 1.7 km | MPC · JPL |
| 336819 | 2011 EW_{25} | — | April 7, 2003 | Kitt Peak | Spacewatch | · | 1.3 km | MPC · JPL |
| 336820 | 2011 EZ_{25} | — | January 24, 2007 | Mount Lemmon | Mount Lemmon Survey | · | 1.3 km | MPC · JPL |
| 336821 | 2011 EP_{35} | — | March 12, 2002 | Kitt Peak | Spacewatch | · | 1.8 km | MPC · JPL |
| 336822 | 2011 EZ_{37} | — | December 27, 2005 | Kitt Peak | Spacewatch | · | 1.4 km | MPC · JPL |
| 336823 | 2011 EH_{40} | — | April 24, 2007 | Mount Lemmon | Mount Lemmon Survey | · | 1.7 km | MPC · JPL |
| 336824 | 2011 EU_{41} | — | February 1, 2006 | Kitt Peak | Spacewatch | · | 3.9 km | MPC · JPL |
| 336825 | 2011 EY_{43} | — | September 22, 2009 | Mount Lemmon | Mount Lemmon Survey | MAS | 900 m | MPC · JPL |
| 336826 | 2011 EJ_{54} | — | January 6, 2006 | Kitt Peak | Spacewatch | · | 2.1 km | MPC · JPL |
| 336827 | 2011 EP_{54} | — | September 18, 2009 | Kitt Peak | Spacewatch | · | 930 m | MPC · JPL |
| 336828 | 2011 EO_{66} | — | March 11, 1996 | Kitt Peak | Spacewatch | · | 1.4 km | MPC · JPL |
| 336829 | 2011 EH_{69} | — | October 23, 2004 | Kitt Peak | Spacewatch | HOF | 3.4 km | MPC · JPL |
| 336830 | 2011 EF_{74} | — | March 19, 2002 | Anderson Mesa | LONEOS | · | 2.4 km | MPC · JPL |
| 336831 | 2011 EG_{77} | — | January 16, 2005 | Kitt Peak | Spacewatch | · | 3.4 km | MPC · JPL |
| 336832 | 2011 EL_{78} | — | September 28, 2000 | Kitt Peak | Spacewatch | · | 1.9 km | MPC · JPL |
| 336833 | 2011 FZ | — | September 23, 2008 | Kitt Peak | Spacewatch | ADE | 2.5 km | MPC · JPL |
| 336834 | 2011 FC_{1} | — | October 6, 2004 | Kitt Peak | Spacewatch | · | 3.2 km | MPC · JPL |
| 336835 | 2011 FH_{2} | — | April 5, 2000 | Socorro | LINEAR | · | 1.4 km | MPC · JPL |
| 336836 | 2011 FJ_{6} | — | May 13, 2002 | Palomar | NEAT | · | 2.3 km | MPC · JPL |
| 336837 | 2011 FD_{8} | — | April 20, 2006 | Kitt Peak | Spacewatch | · | 2.5 km | MPC · JPL |
| 336838 | 2011 FR_{11} | — | September 26, 2008 | Kitt Peak | Spacewatch | AGN | 1.3 km | MPC · JPL |
| 336839 | 2011 FT_{16} | — | February 15, 1994 | Kitt Peak | Spacewatch | · | 4.5 km | MPC · JPL |
| 336840 | 2011 FU_{17} | — | December 19, 2004 | Mount Lemmon | Mount Lemmon Survey | · | 3.6 km | MPC · JPL |
| 336841 | 2011 FH_{24} | — | February 21, 2007 | Kitt Peak | Spacewatch | · | 1.5 km | MPC · JPL |
| 336842 | 2011 FM_{27} | — | May 24, 2006 | Kitt Peak | Spacewatch | EOS | 1.6 km | MPC · JPL |
| 336843 | 2011 FV_{28} | — | October 7, 2008 | Mount Lemmon | Mount Lemmon Survey | · | 2.6 km | MPC · JPL |
| 336844 | 2011 FA_{30} | — | January 31, 2006 | Kitt Peak | Spacewatch | · | 2.4 km | MPC · JPL |
| 336845 | 2011 FL_{32} | — | August 30, 2005 | Kitt Peak | Spacewatch | · | 1.2 km | MPC · JPL |
| 336846 | 2011 FC_{34} | — | March 4, 2005 | Kitt Peak | Spacewatch | · | 3.4 km | MPC · JPL |
| 336847 | 2011 FO_{37} | — | October 1, 2008 | Kitt Peak | Spacewatch | JUN | 1.1 km | MPC · JPL |
| 336848 | 2011 FL_{46} | — | March 8, 2005 | Mount Lemmon | Mount Lemmon Survey | · | 2.6 km | MPC · JPL |
| 336849 | 2011 FK_{47} | — | September 10, 2007 | Kitt Peak | Spacewatch | · | 2.8 km | MPC · JPL |
| 336850 | 2011 FB_{48} | — | October 26, 2008 | Mount Lemmon | Mount Lemmon Survey | · | 4.0 km | MPC · JPL |
| 336851 | 2011 FQ_{50} | — | July 30, 2008 | Kitt Peak | Spacewatch | · | 1.3 km | MPC · JPL |
| 336852 | 2011 FL_{51} | — | April 12, 2004 | Kitt Peak | Spacewatch | NYS | 1 km | MPC · JPL |
| 336853 | 2011 FN_{51} | — | April 7, 2000 | Socorro | LINEAR | · | 4.2 km | MPC · JPL |
| 336854 | 2011 FB_{53} | — | January 29, 2007 | Kitt Peak | Spacewatch | · | 1.0 km | MPC · JPL |
| 336855 | 2011 FU_{55} | — | September 6, 2008 | Catalina | CSS | · | 2.3 km | MPC · JPL |
| 336856 | 2011 FE_{56} | — | November 19, 2006 | Kitt Peak | Spacewatch | · | 820 m | MPC · JPL |
| 336857 | 2011 FZ_{82} | — | October 19, 1995 | Kitt Peak | Spacewatch | · | 2.5 km | MPC · JPL |
| 336858 | 2011 FB_{97} | — | September 13, 2004 | Socorro | LINEAR | · | 1.4 km | MPC · JPL |
| 336859 | 2011 FN_{103} | — | September 24, 2004 | Kitt Peak | Spacewatch | · | 2.2 km | MPC · JPL |
| 336860 | 2011 FN_{129} | — | August 31, 2008 | Moletai | K. Černis | · | 1.6 km | MPC · JPL |
| 336861 | 2011 FP_{129} | — | December 18, 2003 | Socorro | LINEAR | · | 1.1 km | MPC · JPL |
| 336862 | 2011 FY_{134} | — | October 25, 2005 | Kitt Peak | Spacewatch | · | 1.2 km | MPC · JPL |
| 336863 | 2011 FV_{140} | — | December 19, 2009 | Mount Lemmon | Mount Lemmon Survey | · | 2.9 km | MPC · JPL |
| 336864 | 2011 FA_{142} | — | January 23, 2006 | Kitt Peak | Spacewatch | AGN | 1.6 km | MPC · JPL |
| 336865 | 2011 FW_{144} | — | November 22, 2006 | Mount Lemmon | Mount Lemmon Survey | V | 830 m | MPC · JPL |
| 336866 | 2011 FG_{145} | — | December 6, 2005 | Kitt Peak | Spacewatch | · | 1.9 km | MPC · JPL |
| 336867 | 2011 FN_{146} | — | September 1, 2003 | Socorro | LINEAR | · | 2.4 km | MPC · JPL |
| 336868 | 2011 FV_{146} | — | February 1, 1995 | Kitt Peak | Spacewatch | · | 1.7 km | MPC · JPL |
| 336869 | 2011 FP_{151} | — | February 1, 2005 | Catalina | CSS | · | 5.0 km | MPC · JPL |
| 336870 | 2011 FQ_{151} | — | July 15, 2007 | Siding Spring | SSS | · | 6.3 km | MPC · JPL |
| 336871 | 2011 FK_{152} | — | January 8, 2002 | Palomar | NEAT | · | 2.0 km | MPC · JPL |
| 336872 | 2011 FL_{152} | — | March 1, 2005 | Catalina | CSS | · | 4.1 km | MPC · JPL |
| 336873 | 2011 GE_{4} | — | September 22, 2008 | Kitt Peak | Spacewatch | · | 1.6 km | MPC · JPL |
| 336874 | 2011 GA_{28} | — | March 20, 2002 | Socorro | LINEAR | GEF | 1.6 km | MPC · JPL |
| 336875 | 2011 GP_{40} | — | May 5, 2002 | Palomar | NEAT | · | 2.9 km | MPC · JPL |
| 336876 | 2011 GQ_{41} | — | May 23, 2003 | Kitt Peak | Spacewatch | · | 2.2 km | MPC · JPL |
| 336877 Qifaren | 2011 GT_{41} | Qifaren | May 16, 2007 | XuYi | PMO NEO Survey Program | · | 2.4 km | MPC · JPL |
| 336878 | 2011 GL_{46} | — | August 21, 2003 | Campo Imperatore | CINEOS | · | 2.2 km | MPC · JPL |
| 336879 | 2011 GP_{47} | — | October 7, 2008 | Mount Lemmon | Mount Lemmon Survey | · | 2.0 km | MPC · JPL |
| 336880 | 2011 GS_{49} | — | March 13, 2007 | Mount Lemmon | Mount Lemmon Survey | · | 3.1 km | MPC · JPL |
| 336881 | 2011 GX_{49} | — | March 9, 2005 | Socorro | LINEAR | T_{j} (2.99) · EUP | 5.0 km | MPC · JPL |
| 336882 | 2011 GN_{53} | — | December 25, 2009 | Kitt Peak | Spacewatch | MAR | 1.6 km | MPC · JPL |
| 336883 | 2011 GO_{53} | — | March 14, 2007 | Kitt Peak | Spacewatch | MAR | 1.1 km | MPC · JPL |
| 336884 | 2011 GF_{55} | — | February 1, 2005 | Kitt Peak | Spacewatch | · | 2.2 km | MPC · JPL |
| 336885 | 2011 GT_{55} | — | May 2, 2006 | Mount Lemmon | Mount Lemmon Survey | · | 2.2 km | MPC · JPL |
| 336886 | 2011 GQ_{57} | — | February 2, 2006 | Kitt Peak | Spacewatch | · | 3.4 km | MPC · JPL |
| 336887 | 2011 GU_{57} | — | May 23, 2003 | Kitt Peak | Spacewatch | · | 1.5 km | MPC · JPL |
| 336888 | 2011 GY_{57} | — | December 21, 2003 | Kitt Peak | Spacewatch | HYG | 6.0 km | MPC · JPL |
| 336889 | 2011 GE_{59} | — | March 15, 2007 | Kitt Peak | Spacewatch | · | 1.3 km | MPC · JPL |
| 336890 | 2011 GA_{60} | — | April 4, 2005 | Catalina | CSS | (5931) | 4.8 km | MPC · JPL |
| 336891 | 2011 GX_{60} | — | October 7, 2000 | Kitt Peak | Spacewatch | · | 1.9 km | MPC · JPL |
| 336892 | 2011 GS_{62} | — | October 23, 2005 | Catalina | CSS | · | 1.9 km | MPC · JPL |
| 336893 | 2011 GW_{62} | — | February 9, 2006 | Palomar | NEAT | GEF | 1.9 km | MPC · JPL |
| 336894 | 2011 GZ_{63} | — | March 20, 2002 | Kitt Peak | Spacewatch | · | 2.0 km | MPC · JPL |
| 336895 | 2011 GG_{66} | — | July 16, 2004 | Cerro Tololo | Deep Ecliptic Survey | · | 1.7 km | MPC · JPL |
| 336896 | 2011 GE_{70} | — | May 26, 2006 | Mount Lemmon | Mount Lemmon Survey | · | 3.3 km | MPC · JPL |
| 336897 | 2011 GY_{76} | — | November 9, 2004 | Catalina | CSS | PAD | 3.1 km | MPC · JPL |
| 336898 | 2011 GW_{77} | — | February 7, 2002 | Palomar | NEAT | · | 2.3 km | MPC · JPL |
| 336899 | 2011 GO_{82} | — | March 29, 2011 | Mount Lemmon | Mount Lemmon Survey | PAD | 1.8 km | MPC · JPL |
| 336900 | 2011 GE_{84} | — | April 16, 2007 | Mount Lemmon | Mount Lemmon Survey | · | 1.1 km | MPC · JPL |

== 336901–337000 ==
back to top

| Designation | | | Discovery | | | Properties | | Ref |
| Permanent | Provisional | Named after | Date | Site | Discoverer(s) | Category | Diam. | Ref |
|---|---|---|---|---|---|---|---|---|
| 336901 | 2011 GQ_{85} | — | May 24, 2006 | Catalina | CSS | · | 3.8 km | MPC · JPL |
| 336902 | 2011 HQ_{1} | — | May 6, 2002 | Palomar | NEAT | · | 3.0 km | MPC · JPL |
| 336903 | 2011 HH_{6} | — | November 4, 2007 | Mount Lemmon | Mount Lemmon Survey | · | 4.7 km | MPC · JPL |
| 336904 | 2011 HT_{6} | — | May 28, 2008 | Kitt Peak | Spacewatch | · | 820 m | MPC · JPL |
| 336905 | 2011 HY_{9} | — | September 29, 2008 | Catalina | CSS | · | 2.3 km | MPC · JPL |
| 336906 | 2011 HG_{12} | — | February 27, 2006 | Kitt Peak | Spacewatch | · | 2.7 km | MPC · JPL |
| 336907 | 2011 HF_{13} | — | March 26, 2003 | Kitt Peak | Spacewatch | · | 1.6 km | MPC · JPL |
| 336908 | 2011 HP_{14} | — | March 23, 2006 | Kitt Peak | Spacewatch | · | 2.3 km | MPC · JPL |
| 336909 | 2011 HS_{14} | — | September 8, 2008 | Kitt Peak | Spacewatch | AGN | 1.5 km | MPC · JPL |
| 336910 | 2011 HX_{14} | — | December 12, 2004 | Kitt Peak | Spacewatch | KOR | 1.9 km | MPC · JPL |
| 336911 | 2011 HS_{19} | — | December 19, 2009 | Mount Lemmon | Mount Lemmon Survey | HYG | 3.4 km | MPC · JPL |
| 336912 | 2011 HU_{21} | — | June 14, 2007 | Kitt Peak | Spacewatch | · | 2.3 km | MPC · JPL |
| 336913 | 2011 HB_{22} | — | April 12, 2005 | Mount Lemmon | Mount Lemmon Survey | EOS | 2.2 km | MPC · JPL |
| 336914 | 2011 HD_{22} | — | April 11, 2007 | Kitt Peak | Spacewatch | · | 1.3 km | MPC · JPL |
| 336915 | 2011 HP_{22} | — | October 25, 2008 | Socorro | LINEAR | HOF | 3.7 km | MPC · JPL |
| 336916 | 2011 HH_{27} | — | June 13, 2001 | Kitt Peak | Spacewatch | · | 5.0 km | MPC · JPL |
| 336917 | 2011 HD_{34} | — | February 25, 2006 | Mount Lemmon | Mount Lemmon Survey | · | 2.0 km | MPC · JPL |
| 336918 | 2011 HP_{35} | — | September 28, 2003 | Socorro | LINEAR | · | 2.4 km | MPC · JPL |
| 336919 | 2011 HX_{35} | — | May 4, 2002 | Kitt Peak | Spacewatch | NEM | 2.2 km | MPC · JPL |
| 336920 | 2011 HG_{45} | — | September 14, 2007 | Catalina | CSS | · | 4.8 km | MPC · JPL |
| 336921 | 2011 HO_{49} | — | August 24, 2001 | Anderson Mesa | LONEOS | · | 3.1 km | MPC · JPL |
| 336922 | 2011 HB_{50} | — | April 6, 2000 | Kitt Peak | Spacewatch | · | 2.4 km | MPC · JPL |
| 336923 | 2011 HU_{50} | — | August 16, 2001 | Palomar | NEAT | · | 3.8 km | MPC · JPL |
| 336924 | 2011 HT_{51} | — | August 10, 2007 | Kitt Peak | Spacewatch | EOS | 2.1 km | MPC · JPL |
| 336925 | 2011 HG_{54} | — | February 4, 2006 | Kitt Peak | Spacewatch | · | 1.9 km | MPC · JPL |
| 336926 | 2011 HC_{56} | — | February 2, 2001 | Kitt Peak | Spacewatch | WIT | 1.1 km | MPC · JPL |
| 336927 | 2011 HH_{56} | — | March 17, 2005 | Kitt Peak | Spacewatch | · | 3.3 km | MPC · JPL |
| 336928 | 2011 HM_{56} | — | May 8, 2006 | Mount Lemmon | Mount Lemmon Survey | · | 2.5 km | MPC · JPL |
| 336929 | 2011 HA_{57} | — | September 12, 2007 | Catalina | CSS | EOS | 2.3 km | MPC · JPL |
| 336930 | 2011 HF_{57} | — | September 3, 2007 | Catalina | CSS | · | 2.6 km | MPC · JPL |
| 336931 | 2011 HJ_{59} | — | April 5, 2002 | Kitt Peak | Spacewatch | HNS · slow | 1.8 km | MPC · JPL |
| 336932 | 2011 HO_{59} | — | December 22, 2003 | Kitt Peak | Spacewatch | VER | 2.9 km | MPC · JPL |
| 336933 | 2011 HU_{59} | — | March 13, 2005 | Kitt Peak | Spacewatch | · | 4.9 km | MPC · JPL |
| 336934 | 2011 HU_{62} | — | May 11, 2007 | Catalina | CSS | · | 2.1 km | MPC · JPL |
| 336935 | 2011 HG_{63} | — | November 19, 2001 | Socorro | LINEAR | · | 1.6 km | MPC · JPL |
| 336936 | 2011 HJ_{63} | — | February 22, 2006 | Catalina | CSS | AGN | 1.5 km | MPC · JPL |
| 336937 | 2011 HH_{64} | — | October 10, 2007 | Mount Lemmon | Mount Lemmon Survey | EOS | 2.1 km | MPC · JPL |
| 336938 | 2011 HS_{65} | — | September 30, 2008 | Mount Lemmon | Mount Lemmon Survey | · | 2.6 km | MPC · JPL |
| 336939 | 2011 HJ_{66} | — | March 13, 2005 | Anderson Mesa | LONEOS | EUP | 4.5 km | MPC · JPL |
| 336940 | 2011 HL_{68} | — | March 13, 2007 | Kitt Peak | Spacewatch | · | 1.6 km | MPC · JPL |
| 336941 | 2011 HG_{69} | — | November 10, 2004 | Kitt Peak | Deep Ecliptic Survey | PAD | 1.7 km | MPC · JPL |
| 336942 | 2011 HV_{70} | — | May 9, 2007 | Kitt Peak | Spacewatch | · | 2.5 km | MPC · JPL |
| 336943 | 2011 HR_{71} | — | March 29, 2004 | Kitt Peak | Spacewatch | · | 1.5 km | MPC · JPL |
| 336944 | 2011 HA_{74} | — | September 20, 2001 | Socorro | LINEAR | · | 3.6 km | MPC · JPL |
| 336945 | 2011 HH_{74} | — | March 10, 2005 | Mount Lemmon | Mount Lemmon Survey | · | 3.3 km | MPC · JPL |
| 336946 | 2011 HK_{77} | — | April 26, 2003 | Kitt Peak | Spacewatch | · | 1.3 km | MPC · JPL |
| 336947 | 2011 HD_{78} | — | December 3, 2008 | Mount Lemmon | Mount Lemmon Survey | · | 3.1 km | MPC · JPL |
| 336948 | 2011 HB_{80} | — | September 26, 2008 | Kitt Peak | Spacewatch | · | 2.3 km | MPC · JPL |
| 336949 | 2011 HL_{81} | — | April 17, 2007 | Catalina | CSS | · | 2.5 km | MPC · JPL |
| 336950 | 2011 HR_{82} | — | December 3, 2008 | Mount Lemmon | Mount Lemmon Survey | · | 3.6 km | MPC · JPL |
| 336951 | 2011 HG_{83} | — | December 22, 2005 | Kitt Peak | Spacewatch | · | 1.8 km | MPC · JPL |
| 336952 | 2011 HL_{84} | — | March 13, 2005 | Kitt Peak | Spacewatch | · | 4.3 km | MPC · JPL |
| 336953 | 2011 HO_{88} | — | April 15, 2007 | Kitt Peak | Spacewatch | · | 1.1 km | MPC · JPL |
| 336954 | 2011 HR_{92} | — | October 31, 1999 | Kitt Peak | Spacewatch | · | 790 m | MPC · JPL |
| 336955 | 2011 HQ_{100} | — | January 11, 2010 | Kitt Peak | Spacewatch | · | 2.2 km | MPC · JPL |
| 336956 | 2011 JU | — | September 17, 1995 | Kitt Peak | Spacewatch | T_{j} (2.98) | 6.3 km | MPC · JPL |
| 336957 | 2011 JJ_{2} | — | September 12, 2004 | Kitt Peak | Spacewatch | KON | 3.5 km | MPC · JPL |
| 336958 | 2011 JZ_{8} | — | March 24, 2006 | Kitt Peak | Spacewatch | · | 2.6 km | MPC · JPL |
| 336959 | 2011 JP_{9} | — | July 27, 2001 | Haleakala | NEAT | · | 3.9 km | MPC · JPL |
| 336960 | 2011 JX_{12} | — | August 17, 2001 | Palomar | NEAT | · | 3.7 km | MPC · JPL |
| 336961 | 2011 JC_{14} | — | January 18, 2004 | Palomar | NEAT | URS | 4.5 km | MPC · JPL |
| 336962 | 2011 JZ_{14} | — | April 26, 2006 | Anderson Mesa | LONEOS | BRA | 1.8 km | MPC · JPL |
| 336963 | 2011 JR_{15} | — | June 29, 1995 | Kitt Peak | Spacewatch | · | 3.7 km | MPC · JPL |
| 336964 | 2011 JW_{15} | — | December 22, 2003 | Kitt Peak | Spacewatch | · | 3.8 km | MPC · JPL |
| 336965 | 2011 JF_{16} | — | March 18, 2001 | Kitt Peak | Spacewatch | · | 2.5 km | MPC · JPL |
| 336966 | 2011 JB_{17} | — | October 13, 2007 | Mount Lemmon | Mount Lemmon Survey | · | 4.0 km | MPC · JPL |
| 336967 | 2011 JF_{17} | — | October 15, 2001 | Apache Point | SDSS | · | 2.6 km | MPC · JPL |
| 336968 | 2011 JJ_{17} | — | March 24, 2006 | Kitt Peak | Spacewatch | · | 2.8 km | MPC · JPL |
| 336969 | 2011 JD_{21} | — | February 14, 2010 | Mount Lemmon | Mount Lemmon Survey | · | 2.7 km | MPC · JPL |
| 336970 | 2011 JS_{21} | — | September 28, 2003 | Kitt Peak | Spacewatch | · | 1.7 km | MPC · JPL |
| 336971 | 2011 JM_{26} | — | April 7, 2006 | Kitt Peak | Spacewatch | · | 2.8 km | MPC · JPL |
| 336972 | 2011 JQ_{26} | — | September 14, 2002 | Kitt Peak | Spacewatch | · | 1.8 km | MPC · JPL |
| 336973 | 2011 JX_{27} | — | November 6, 2008 | Kitt Peak | Spacewatch | · | 3.3 km | MPC · JPL |
| 336974 | 2011 JX_{28} | — | January 2, 1998 | Kitt Peak | Spacewatch | EOS | 2.8 km | MPC · JPL |
| 336975 | 2011 KA_{1} | — | September 17, 2003 | Kitt Peak | Spacewatch | · | 1.8 km | MPC · JPL |
| 336976 | 2011 KV_{6} | — | March 10, 2005 | Mount Lemmon | Mount Lemmon Survey | THM | 2.8 km | MPC · JPL |
| 336977 | 2011 KP_{8} | — | June 23, 2000 | Kitt Peak | Spacewatch | TIR | 3.9 km | MPC · JPL |
| 336978 | 2011 KS_{10} | — | August 25, 2001 | Socorro | LINEAR | · | 3.3 km | MPC · JPL |
| 336979 | 2011 KY_{22} | — | October 1, 2003 | Kitt Peak | Spacewatch | · | 2.2 km | MPC · JPL |
| 336980 | 2011 KE_{23} | — | January 2, 2009 | Mount Lemmon | Mount Lemmon Survey | HYG | 3.3 km | MPC · JPL |
| 336981 | 2011 KB_{26} | — | October 26, 2005 | Kitt Peak | Spacewatch | · | 1.3 km | MPC · JPL |
| 336982 | 2011 KO_{33} | — | January 17, 2004 | Kitt Peak | Spacewatch | · | 3.8 km | MPC · JPL |
| 336983 | 2011 KA_{34} | — | January 15, 2004 | Kitt Peak | Spacewatch | EOS | 2.7 km | MPC · JPL |
| 336984 | 2011 KJ_{34} | — | December 2, 2004 | Kitt Peak | Spacewatch | · | 3.4 km | MPC · JPL |
| 336985 | 2011 KL_{38} | — | March 26, 1995 | Kitt Peak | Spacewatch | EOS | 2.3 km | MPC · JPL |
| 336986 | 2011 KR_{44} | — | March 3, 2005 | Catalina | CSS | · | 2.9 km | MPC · JPL |
| 336987 | 2011 KR_{47} | — | October 7, 2005 | Mauna Kea | A. Boattini | · | 1.6 km | MPC · JPL |
| 336988 | 2011 LD | — | October 13, 2007 | Mount Lemmon | Mount Lemmon Survey | · | 2.4 km | MPC · JPL |
| 336989 | 2011 LB_{5} | — | July 27, 2001 | Anderson Mesa | LONEOS | · | 4.4 km | MPC · JPL |
| 336990 | 2011 LT_{8} | — | March 4, 2000 | Kitt Peak | Spacewatch | KOR | 1.7 km | MPC · JPL |
| 336991 | 2011 LV_{14} | — | April 30, 2005 | Kitt Peak | Spacewatch | · | 3.1 km | MPC · JPL |
| 336992 | 2011 LS_{25} | — | July 21, 2006 | Mount Lemmon | Mount Lemmon Survey | HYG | 3.6 km | MPC · JPL |
| 336993 | 2011 QQ_{3} | — | April 11, 2008 | Mount Lemmon | Mount Lemmon Survey | L5 | 10 km | MPC · JPL |
| 336994 | 2012 DG_{52} | — | March 15, 2001 | Kitt Peak | Spacewatch | MAS | 910 m | MPC · JPL |
| 336995 | 2012 HO_{50} | — | November 18, 2003 | Kitt Peak | Spacewatch | · | 4.2 km | MPC · JPL |
| 336996 | 2012 KM_{2} | — | September 19, 2001 | Socorro | LINEAR | · | 1.8 km | MPC · JPL |
| 336997 | 2012 KL_{24} | — | January 3, 2001 | Socorro | LINEAR | H | 880 m | MPC · JPL |
| 336998 | 2012 KB_{47} | — | April 19, 2006 | Mount Lemmon | Mount Lemmon Survey | · | 3.6 km | MPC · JPL |
| 336999 | 2012 LH | — | March 27, 2009 | Siding Spring | SSS | H | 680 m | MPC · JPL |
| 337000 | 2012 MJ_{3} | — | January 23, 2006 | Kitt Peak | Spacewatch | · | 2.5 km | MPC · JPL |

back to top

== See also ==
- Meanings of minor-planet names: 336001–337000
