= Meanings of minor-planet names: 335001–336000 =

As minor planet discoveries are confirmed, they are given a permanent number by the IAU's Minor Planet Center (MPC), and the discoverers can then submit names for them, following the IAU's naming conventions. The list below concerns those minor planets in the specified number-range that have received names, and explains the meanings of those names.

Official naming citations of newly named small Solar System bodies are approved and published in a bulletin by IAU's Working Group for Small Bodies Nomenclature (WGSBN). Before May 2021, citations were published in MPC's Minor Planet Circulars for many decades. Recent citations can also be found on the JPL Small-Body Database (SBDB). Until his death in 2016, German astronomer Lutz D. Schmadel compiled these citations into the Dictionary of Minor Planet Names (DMP) and regularly updated the collection.

Based on Paul Herget's The Names of the Minor Planets, Schmadel also researched the unclear origin of numerous asteroids, most of which had been named prior to World War II. This article incorporates text from this source, which is in the public domain: SBDB New namings may only be added to this list below after official publication as the preannouncement of names is condemned. The WGSBN publishes a comprehensive guideline for the naming rules of non-cometary small Solar System bodies.

== 335001–335100 ==
Named minor planet	Provisional	This minor planet was named for...	Ref · Catalog
There are no named minor planets in this number range

== 335101–335200 ==
back to top

Named minor planet	Provisional	This minor planet was named for...	Ref · Catalog
There are no named minor planets in this number range

== 335201–335300 ==
back to top

Named minor planet	Provisional	This minor planet was named for...	Ref · Catalog
335292 Larrey	2005 PG_{5}	Dominique-Jean Larrey (1766–1842), a surgeon of the great army of Napoleon.	JPL · 335292

== 335301–335400 ==
back to top

Named minor planet	Provisional	This minor planet was named for...	Ref · Catalog
335306 Mouhot	2005 QK_{30}	Clement Mouhot (born 1978) is a French mathematician and academic. He is Professor of Mathematical Sciences at the University of Cambridge, and a fellow of King's College, Cambridge. His research is primarily in partial differential equations and mathematical physics.	JPL · 335306

== 335401–335500 ==
back to top

Named minor planet	Provisional	This minor planet was named for...	Ref · Catalog
335500 Espresso	2005 YQ_{29}	Espresso is a type of coffee made by forcing pressurised hot water through very finely-ground, compacted coffee beans.	IAU · 335500

== 335501–335600 ==
back to top

Named minor planet	Provisional	This minor planet was named for...	Ref · Catalog
335533 Tarasprystavski	2006 AH_{83}	Taras Prystavski (b. 1977) is a Ukrainian amateur astronomer and prolific comet observer. His comet observations have led to the recovery of several periodic comets, and in 2020 he discovered the nucleus fragmentation of comet C/2018 F4 (PANSTARRS).	IAU · 335533

== 335601–335700 ==
back to top

Named minor planet	Provisional	This minor planet was named for...	Ref · Catalog
335668 Ignalina	2006 ST_{372}	Ignalina, a city in eastern Lithuania.	IAU · 335668

== 335701–335800 ==
back to top

Named minor planet	Provisional	This minor planet was named for...	Ref · Catalog
335799 Zonglü	2007 HW_{15}	Zonglü, or Chinese windmill palm, is a palm native to tropical regions in East Asia. It is a popular ornamental plant in southern China.	JPL · 335799

== 335801–335900 ==
back to top

Named minor planet	Provisional	This minor planet was named for...	Ref · Catalog
335853 Valléedaoste	2007 RT_{6}	Aosta Valley, a semi-autonomous region in northwestern Italy, and location of the Astronomical Observatory of the Aosta Valley, active in scientific research, public outreach and education	JPL · 335853

== 335901–336000 ==
back to top

Named minor planet	Provisional	This minor planet was named for...	Ref · Catalog
335968 Xiejin	2007 TW_{171}	Xie Jin (1923–2008), a Chinese film director.	IAU · 335968

back to top

Preceded by 334,001–335,000	Meanings of minor-planet names List of minor planets: 335,001–336,000	Succeeded by 336,001–337,000
