= List of minor planets: 335001–336000 =

The following is a partial list of minor planets, running from minor-planet number 335001 through 336000, inclusive. The primary data for this and other partial lists is based on JPL's "Small-Body Orbital Elements" and data available from the Minor Planet Center. Critical list information is also provided by the MPC, unless otherwise specified from Lowell Observatory. A detailed description of the table's columns and additional sources are given on the main page including a complete list of every page in this series, and a statistical break-up on the dynamical classification of minor planets.

Also see the summary list of all named bodies in numerical and alphabetical order, and the corresponding naming citations for the number range of this particular list. New namings may only be added to this list after official publication, as the preannouncement of names is condemned by the Working Group for Small Bodies Nomenclature of the International Astronomical Union.

Near-Earth obj.	MBA (inner)	MBA (outer)	Centaur
Mars-crosser	MBA (middle)	Jupiter trojan	Trans-Neptunian obj.
Unclassified

== 335001–335100 ==
Designation			Discovery			Properties		Ref
Permanent	Provisional	Named after	Date	Site	Discoverer(s)	Category	Diam.	Ref
335001	2004 GF_{52}	—	April 13, 2004	Kitt Peak	Spacewatch	V	810 m	MPC · JPL
335002	2004 GY_{55}	—	April 13, 2004	Kitt Peak	Spacewatch	·	3.6 km	MPC · JPL
335003	2004 GG_{56}	—	April 13, 2004	Kitt Peak	Spacewatch	NYS	870 m	MPC · JPL
335004	2004 GL_{64}	—	April 13, 2004	Kitt Peak	Spacewatch	·	1.3 km	MPC · JPL
335005	2004 HJ_{4}	—	April 16, 2004	Socorro	LINEAR	·	1.3 km	MPC · JPL
335006	2004 HK_{8}	—	April 16, 2004	Socorro	LINEAR	·	1.7 km	MPC · JPL
335007	2004 HR_{20}	—	April 19, 2004	Kitt Peak	Spacewatch	·	1.4 km	MPC · JPL
335008	2004 HV_{33}	—	April 16, 2004	Socorro	LINEAR	·	1.7 km	MPC · JPL
335009	2004 HO_{35}	—	April 20, 2004	Socorro	LINEAR	NYS	1.2 km	MPC · JPL
335010	2004 HN_{37}	—	April 21, 2004	Catalina	CSS	·	2.4 km	MPC · JPL
335011	2004 HB_{51}	—	April 23, 2004	Siding Spring	SSS	PHO	1.3 km	MPC · JPL
335012	2004 HX_{52}	—	April 25, 2004	Socorro	LINEAR	·	1.7 km	MPC · JPL
335013	2004 HW_{76}	—	April 26, 2004	Mauna Kea	P. A. Wiegert	MAS	670 m	MPC · JPL
335014	2004 JJ	—	May 8, 2004	Wrightwood	J. W. Young	·	1.3 km	MPC · JPL
335015	2004 JK_{31}	—	May 15, 2004	Socorro	LINEAR	·	1.5 km	MPC · JPL
335016	2004 KJ_{6}	—	May 17, 2004	Socorro	LINEAR	·	1.9 km	MPC · JPL
335017	2004 LA_{8}	—	June 11, 2004	Anderson Mesa	LONEOS	·	1.6 km	MPC · JPL
335018	2004 NF_{12}	—	July 11, 2004	Socorro	LINEAR	·	1.7 km	MPC · JPL
335019	2004 NC_{16}	—	July 11, 2004	Socorro	LINEAR	H	830 m	MPC · JPL
335020	2004 NN_{19}	—	June 12, 2004	Siding Spring	SSS	H	850 m	MPC · JPL
335021	2004 OP_{3}	—	July 16, 2004	Socorro	LINEAR	·	1.6 km	MPC · JPL
335022	2004 OV_{10}	—	July 21, 2004	Siding Spring	SSS	H	840 m	MPC · JPL
335023	2004 PM_{1}	—	August 3, 2004	Siding Spring	SSS	H	920 m	MPC · JPL
335024	2004 PD_{20}	—	August 9, 2004	Socorro	LINEAR	·	540 m	MPC · JPL
335025	2004 PA_{22}	—	August 8, 2004	Socorro	LINEAR	·	1.6 km	MPC · JPL
335026	2004 PY_{53}	—	August 8, 2004	Socorro	LINEAR	·	1.1 km	MPC · JPL
335027	2004 PM_{61}	—	August 9, 2004	Socorro	LINEAR	H	820 m	MPC · JPL
335028	2004 PU_{92}	—	August 11, 2004	Wrightwood	J. W. Young	·	1.1 km	MPC · JPL
335029	2004 QU	—	August 18, 2004	Pla D'Arguines	R. Ferrando	H	690 m	MPC · JPL
335030	2004 QN_{10}	—	August 21, 2004	Siding Spring	SSS	·	1.2 km	MPC · JPL
335031	2004 QJ_{17}	—	August 25, 2004	Socorro	LINEAR	H	920 m	MPC · JPL
335032	2004 QZ_{25}	—	August 20, 2004	Catalina	CSS	H	730 m	MPC · JPL
335033	2004 QA_{29}	—	August 21, 2004	Siding Spring	SSS	·	1.4 km	MPC · JPL
335034	2004 RX_{1}	—	September 6, 2004	Socorro	LINEAR	H	700 m	MPC · JPL
335035	2004 RA_{2}	—	September 6, 2004	Socorro	LINEAR	H	700 m	MPC · JPL
335036	2004 RJ_{2}	—	September 6, 2004	Socorro	LINEAR	H	740 m	MPC · JPL
335037	2004 RP_{11}	—	September 6, 2004	Siding Spring	SSS	·	1.0 km	MPC · JPL
335038	2004 RK_{24}	—	September 8, 2004	Socorro	LINEAR	H	660 m	MPC · JPL
335039	2004 RZ_{27}	—	September 6, 2004	Siding Spring	SSS	·	1.1 km	MPC · JPL
335040	2004 RL_{34}	—	September 7, 2004	Socorro	LINEAR	·	1.0 km	MPC · JPL
335041	2004 RG_{57}	—	September 8, 2004	Socorro	LINEAR	·	1.7 km	MPC · JPL
335042	2004 RB_{62}	—	September 8, 2004	Socorro	LINEAR	·	1.2 km	MPC · JPL
335043	2004 RC_{79}	—	September 8, 2004	Palomar	NEAT	·	1.1 km	MPC · JPL
335044	2004 RE_{93}	—	August 25, 2004	Kitt Peak	Spacewatch	·	1.2 km	MPC · JPL
335045	2004 RW_{96}	—	September 8, 2004	Palomar	NEAT	EUN	1.7 km	MPC · JPL
335046	2004 RH_{98}	—	September 8, 2004	Socorro	LINEAR	·	1.1 km	MPC · JPL
335047	2004 RS_{100}	—	September 8, 2004	Socorro	LINEAR	MAR	1.4 km	MPC · JPL
335048	2004 RW_{103}	—	September 8, 2004	Palomar	NEAT	MAR	1.4 km	MPC · JPL
335049	2004 RZ_{107}	—	September 9, 2004	Socorro	LINEAR	·	890 m	MPC · JPL
335050	2004 RY_{108}	—	September 9, 2004	Kitt Peak	Spacewatch	·	3.9 km	MPC · JPL
335051	2004 RD_{109}	—	September 10, 2004	Desert Moon	Stevens, B. L.	·	1.2 km	MPC · JPL
335052	2004 RA_{110}	—	September 11, 2004	Socorro	LINEAR	·	2.6 km	MPC · JPL
335053	2004 RJ_{110}	—	September 11, 2004	Socorro	LINEAR	H	860 m	MPC · JPL
335054	2004 RJ_{136}	—	September 7, 2004	Palomar	NEAT	·	1.2 km	MPC · JPL
335055	2004 RD_{143}	—	September 8, 2004	Palomar	NEAT	·	1.4 km	MPC · JPL
335056	2004 RR_{150}	—	September 9, 2004	Socorro	LINEAR	·	1.2 km	MPC · JPL
335057	2004 RR_{156}	—	September 10, 2004	Socorro	LINEAR	·	1.4 km	MPC · JPL
335058	2004 RK_{168}	—	September 8, 2004	Socorro	LINEAR	·	1.6 km	MPC · JPL
335059	2004 RK_{169}	—	September 8, 2004	Socorro	LINEAR	·	1.3 km	MPC · JPL
335060	2004 RX_{185}	—	September 10, 2004	Socorro	LINEAR	·	1.3 km	MPC · JPL
335061	2004 RZ_{191}	—	September 10, 2004	Socorro	LINEAR	·	1.6 km	MPC · JPL
335062	2004 RZ_{200}	—	September 10, 2004	Socorro	LINEAR	·	1.7 km	MPC · JPL
335063	2004 RV_{217}	—	September 11, 2004	Socorro	LINEAR	H	860 m	MPC · JPL
335064	2004 RC_{220}	—	September 11, 2004	Socorro	LINEAR	·	2.0 km	MPC · JPL
335065	2004 RF_{221}	—	September 11, 2004	Socorro	LINEAR	JUN	1.4 km	MPC · JPL
335066	2004 RD_{223}	—	September 7, 2004	Socorro	LINEAR	·	4.1 km	MPC · JPL
335067	2004 RH_{224}	—	September 8, 2004	Palomar	NEAT	·	1.7 km	MPC · JPL
335068	2004 RP_{253}	—	September 6, 2004	Palomar	NEAT	·	1.2 km	MPC · JPL
335069	2004 RD_{276}	—	August 21, 2004	Kitt Peak	Spacewatch	·	1.6 km	MPC · JPL
335070	2004 RE_{289}	—	September 15, 2004	Socorro	LINEAR	H	630 m	MPC · JPL
335071	2004 RB_{290}	—	September 13, 2004	Socorro	LINEAR	·	2.3 km	MPC · JPL
335072	2004 RS_{290}	—	September 9, 2004	Socorro	LINEAR	(5)	1.5 km	MPC · JPL
335073	2004 RT_{293}	—	September 11, 2004	Palomar	NEAT	·	1.9 km	MPC · JPL
335074	2004 RT_{316}	—	September 11, 2004	Socorro	LINEAR	·	990 m	MPC · JPL
335075	2004 RD_{323}	—	September 13, 2004	Socorro	LINEAR	·	1.9 km	MPC · JPL
335076	2004 RV_{323}	—	September 13, 2004	Socorro	LINEAR	·	3.4 km	MPC · JPL
335077	2004 RF_{325}	—	September 13, 2004	Socorro	LINEAR	·	1.5 km	MPC · JPL
335078	2004 RD_{337}	—	September 15, 2004	Kitt Peak	Spacewatch	·	610 m	MPC · JPL
335079	2004 RU_{343}	—	September 11, 2004	Palomar	NEAT	·	1.3 km	MPC · JPL
335080	2004 SN	—	August 21, 2004	Goodricke-Pigott	R. A. Tucker	(5)	1.2 km	MPC · JPL
335081	2004 SW_{9}	—	September 16, 2004	Siding Spring	SSS	H	720 m	MPC · JPL
335082	2004 SZ_{15}	—	September 17, 2004	Anderson Mesa	LONEOS	·	1.1 km	MPC · JPL
335083	2004 SF_{28}	—	September 16, 2004	Kitt Peak	Spacewatch	(5)	1.0 km	MPC · JPL
335084	2004 SC_{37}	—	September 17, 2004	Kitt Peak	Spacewatch	·	1.2 km	MPC · JPL
335085	2004 SS_{39}	—	September 17, 2004	Socorro	LINEAR	·	890 m	MPC · JPL
335086	2004 SM_{41}	—	September 17, 2004	Kitt Peak	Spacewatch	(5)	1.4 km	MPC · JPL
335087	2004 TE_{11}	—	October 8, 2004	Socorro	LINEAR	H	860 m	MPC · JPL
335088	2004 TW_{35}	—	October 4, 2004	Kitt Peak	Spacewatch	·	1.2 km	MPC · JPL
335089	2004 TY_{46}	—	October 4, 2004	Kitt Peak	Spacewatch	·	1.6 km	MPC · JPL
335090	2004 TB_{52}	—	October 4, 2004	Kitt Peak	Spacewatch	·	1.7 km	MPC · JPL
335091	2004 TE_{60}	—	October 5, 2004	Anderson Mesa	LONEOS	(5)	990 m	MPC · JPL
335092	2004 TC_{63}	—	October 5, 2004	Kitt Peak	Spacewatch	·	1.5 km	MPC · JPL
335093	2004 TD_{75}	—	October 6, 2004	Kitt Peak	Spacewatch	·	1.1 km	MPC · JPL
335094	2004 TJ_{78}	—	October 4, 2004	Socorro	LINEAR	·	1.6 km	MPC · JPL
335095	2004 TN_{80}	—	October 5, 2004	Kitt Peak	Spacewatch	·	1.2 km	MPC · JPL
335096	2004 TX_{85}	—	October 5, 2004	Kitt Peak	Spacewatch	·	1.3 km	MPC · JPL
335097	2004 TN_{86}	—	October 5, 2004	Kitt Peak	Spacewatch	·	1.5 km	MPC · JPL
335098	2004 TZ_{91}	—	October 5, 2004	Kitt Peak	Spacewatch	·	1.5 km	MPC · JPL
335099	2004 TV_{93}	—	October 5, 2004	Kitt Peak	Spacewatch	·	1.4 km	MPC · JPL
335100	2004 TF_{128}	—	October 7, 2004	Socorro	LINEAR	(5)	1.3 km	MPC · JPL

== 335101–335200 ==
back to top

Designation			Discovery			Properties		Ref
Permanent	Provisional	Named after	Date	Site	Discoverer(s)	Category	Diam.	Ref
335101	2004 TR_{142}	—	October 4, 2004	Kitt Peak	Spacewatch	·	1.2 km	MPC · JPL
335102	2004 TF_{147}	—	October 6, 2004	Kitt Peak	Spacewatch	·	1.8 km	MPC · JPL
335103	2004 TJ_{147}	—	September 15, 2004	Kitt Peak	Spacewatch	·	1.6 km	MPC · JPL
335104	2004 TL_{149}	—	October 6, 2004	Kitt Peak	Spacewatch	WIT	1.1 km	MPC · JPL
335105	2004 TJ_{150}	—	October 6, 2004	Kitt Peak	Spacewatch	·	1.0 km	MPC · JPL
335106	2004 TL_{158}	—	October 6, 2004	Kitt Peak	Spacewatch	·	1.7 km	MPC · JPL
335107	2004 TN_{165}	—	October 7, 2004	Kitt Peak	Spacewatch	·	1.1 km	MPC · JPL
335108	2004 TR_{165}	—	October 7, 2004	Kitt Peak	Spacewatch	·	1.5 km	MPC · JPL
335109	2004 TN_{166}	—	October 7, 2004	Kitt Peak	Spacewatch	·	1.1 km	MPC · JPL
335110	2004 TE_{168}	—	October 7, 2004	Socorro	LINEAR	·	1.5 km	MPC · JPL
335111	2004 TU_{168}	—	October 7, 2004	Socorro	LINEAR	·	1.8 km	MPC · JPL
335112	2004 TD_{184}	—	October 7, 2004	Kitt Peak	Spacewatch	·	2.3 km	MPC · JPL
335113	2004 TW_{186}	—	October 7, 2004	Kitt Peak	Spacewatch	·	1.2 km	MPC · JPL
335114	2004 TJ_{188}	—	October 7, 2004	Kitt Peak	Spacewatch	(5)	1.4 km	MPC · JPL
335115	2004 TG_{208}	—	October 7, 2004	Kitt Peak	Spacewatch	·	2.6 km	MPC · JPL
335116	2004 TT_{212}	—	October 8, 2004	Kitt Peak	Spacewatch	·	1.9 km	MPC · JPL
335117	2004 TQ_{241}	—	October 10, 2004	Palomar	NEAT	·	2.5 km	MPC · JPL
335118	2004 TG_{250}	—	October 7, 2004	Kitt Peak	Spacewatch	EUN	1.3 km	MPC · JPL
335119	2004 TR_{258}	—	October 9, 2004	Socorro	LINEAR	·	1.4 km	MPC · JPL
335120	2004 TU_{258}	—	October 9, 2004	Socorro	LINEAR	·	1.2 km	MPC · JPL
335121	2004 TS_{266}	—	October 9, 2004	Kitt Peak	Spacewatch	(5)	1.4 km	MPC · JPL
335122	2004 TC_{267}	—	October 9, 2004	Kitt Peak	Spacewatch	MAR	1.3 km	MPC · JPL
335123	2004 TF_{272}	—	October 9, 2004	Kitt Peak	Spacewatch	(5)	1.4 km	MPC · JPL
335124	2004 TR_{278}	—	October 9, 2004	Kitt Peak	Spacewatch	·	1.6 km	MPC · JPL
335125	2004 TZ_{282}	—	October 7, 2004	Kitt Peak	Spacewatch	·	1.1 km	MPC · JPL
335126	2004 TB_{285}	—	October 8, 2004	Socorro	LINEAR	·	1.7 km	MPC · JPL
335127	2004 TX_{286}	—	October 9, 2004	Socorro	LINEAR	·	1.3 km	MPC · JPL
335128	2004 TO_{293}	—	October 10, 2004	Kitt Peak	Spacewatch	·	2.0 km	MPC · JPL
335129	2004 TW_{299}	—	October 8, 2004	Socorro	LINEAR	·	4.5 km	MPC · JPL
335130	2004 TQ_{316}	—	October 11, 2004	Kitt Peak	Spacewatch	·	1.4 km	MPC · JPL
335131	2004 TV_{324}	—	October 12, 2004	Kitt Peak	Spacewatch	(5)	1.2 km	MPC · JPL
335132	2004 TH_{345}	—	October 15, 2004	Haleakala	NEAT	·	1.3 km	MPC · JPL
335133	2004 TW_{348}	—	October 7, 2004	Kitt Peak	Spacewatch	·	2.5 km	MPC · JPL
335134	2004 UH_{2}	—	October 18, 2004	Socorro	LINEAR	·	1.4 km	MPC · JPL
335135	2004 UG_{4}	—	October 16, 2004	Socorro	LINEAR	H	870 m	MPC · JPL
335136	2004 VK_{8}	—	November 3, 2004	Anderson Mesa	LONEOS	(5)	2.0 km	MPC · JPL
335137	2004 VH_{14}	—	November 4, 2004	Catalina	CSS	·	2.3 km	MPC · JPL
335138	2004 VT_{23}	—	November 5, 2004	Palomar	NEAT	·	1.6 km	MPC · JPL
335139	2004 VX_{26}	—	November 4, 2004	Catalina	CSS	·	1.5 km	MPC · JPL
335140	2004 VO_{27}	—	November 5, 2004	Palomar	NEAT	EUN	1.4 km	MPC · JPL
335141	2004 VZ_{38}	—	November 4, 2004	Kitt Peak	Spacewatch	·	1.7 km	MPC · JPL
335142	2004 VW_{70}	—	November 7, 2004	Socorro	LINEAR	·	1.3 km	MPC · JPL
335143	2004 VS_{78}	—	November 2, 2004	Anderson Mesa	LONEOS	·	1.4 km	MPC · JPL
335144	2004 VP_{82}	—	November 9, 2004	Catalina	CSS	·	1.3 km	MPC · JPL
335145	2004 VC_{88}	—	November 11, 2004	Kitt Peak	Spacewatch	·	2.1 km	MPC · JPL
335146	2004 WM_{12}	—	November 19, 2004	Anderson Mesa	LONEOS	JUN	1.1 km	MPC · JPL
335147	2004 XF_{5}	—	December 2, 2004	Catalina	CSS	·	1.4 km	MPC · JPL
335148	2004 XZ_{25}	—	December 9, 2004	Kitt Peak	Spacewatch	·	1.9 km	MPC · JPL
335149	2004 XS_{30}	—	December 9, 2004	Socorro	LINEAR	·	1.6 km	MPC · JPL
335150	2004 XU_{31}	—	December 9, 2004	Catalina	CSS	·	2.1 km	MPC · JPL
335151	2004 XH_{45}	—	December 8, 2004	Socorro	LINEAR	·	2.2 km	MPC · JPL
335152	2004 XA_{49}	—	December 11, 2004	Socorro	LINEAR	·	2.1 km	MPC · JPL
335153	2004 XL_{50}	—	December 10, 2004	Hormersdorf	Hormersdorf	·	1.4 km	MPC · JPL
335154	2004 XG_{59}	—	December 10, 2004	Kitt Peak	Spacewatch	·	2.2 km	MPC · JPL
335155	2004 XM_{61}	—	December 14, 2004	Hormersdorf	Hormersdorf	·	3.0 km	MPC · JPL
335156	2004 XH_{64}	—	December 2, 2004	Kitt Peak	Spacewatch	·	3.4 km	MPC · JPL
335157	2004 XU_{73}	—	December 13, 2004	Socorro	LINEAR	·	2.4 km	MPC · JPL
335158	2004 XP_{83}	—	December 11, 2004	Kitt Peak	Spacewatch	·	2.0 km	MPC · JPL
335159	2004 XU_{91}	—	December 11, 2004	Kitt Peak	Spacewatch	·	1.1 km	MPC · JPL
335160	2004 XB_{92}	—	December 11, 2004	Kitt Peak	Spacewatch	·	1.7 km	MPC · JPL
335161	2004 XD_{92}	—	December 11, 2004	Socorro	LINEAR	·	2.3 km	MPC · JPL
335162	2004 XG_{100}	—	October 23, 2004	Kitt Peak	Spacewatch	·	2.2 km	MPC · JPL
335163	2004 XZ_{102}	—	December 14, 2004	Anderson Mesa	LONEOS	PAL · fast	2.9 km	MPC · JPL
335164	2004 XT_{105}	—	December 11, 2004	Socorro	LINEAR	·	2.7 km	MPC · JPL
335165	2004 XK_{116}	—	December 12, 2004	Kitt Peak	Spacewatch	(13314)	2.7 km	MPC · JPL
335166	2004 XV_{124}	—	December 11, 2004	Socorro	LINEAR	·	2.6 km	MPC · JPL
335167	2004 XR_{154}	—	December 15, 2004	Kitt Peak	Spacewatch	·	1.5 km	MPC · JPL
335168	2004 XL_{164}	—	December 11, 2004	Calvin-Rehoboth	L. A. Molnar	·	2.0 km	MPC · JPL
335169	2004 XO_{171}	—	December 10, 2004	Kitt Peak	Spacewatch	·	2.0 km	MPC · JPL
335170	2004 XQ_{174}	—	December 10, 2004	Campo Imperatore	CINEOS	·	2.3 km	MPC · JPL
335171	2004 YK_{3}	—	December 16, 2004	Anderson Mesa	LONEOS	·	1.4 km	MPC · JPL
335172	2004 YS_{9}	—	December 18, 2004	Mount Lemmon	Mount Lemmon Survey	MIS	3.0 km	MPC · JPL
335173	2004 YS_{18}	—	December 18, 2004	Mount Lemmon	Mount Lemmon Survey	LEO	2.5 km	MPC · JPL
335174	2005 AB_{26}	—	January 11, 2005	Socorro	LINEAR	·	2.6 km	MPC · JPL
335175	2005 AY_{33}	—	January 13, 2005	Kitt Peak	Spacewatch	MRX	1.4 km	MPC · JPL
335176	2005 AK_{46}	—	January 11, 2005	Socorro	LINEAR	·	2.8 km	MPC · JPL
335177	2005 AY_{55}	—	January 15, 2005	Kitt Peak	Spacewatch	AST	1.9 km	MPC · JPL
335178	2005 AX_{64}	—	January 13, 2005	Kitt Peak	Spacewatch	L5	9.3 km	MPC · JPL
335179	2005 AD_{77}	—	January 15, 2005	Kitt Peak	Spacewatch	·	2.7 km	MPC · JPL
335180	2005 BT_{4}	—	January 16, 2005	Socorro	LINEAR	ADE	3.6 km	MPC · JPL
335181	2005 BM_{9}	—	January 16, 2005	Socorro	LINEAR	·	1.8 km	MPC · JPL
335182	2005 BR_{11}	—	January 16, 2005	Kitt Peak	Spacewatch	·	3.6 km	MPC · JPL
335183	2005 BP_{48}	—	January 18, 2005	Catalina	CSS	·	3.0 km	MPC · JPL
335184	2005 BM_{49}	—	January 16, 2005	Kitt Peak	Spacewatch	L5	10 km	MPC · JPL
335185	2005 CD_{4}	—	February 1, 2005	Kitt Peak	Spacewatch	PAL	2.6 km	MPC · JPL
335186	2005 CF_{14}	—	February 2, 2005	Kitt Peak	Spacewatch	L5	10 km	MPC · JPL
335187	2005 CG_{50}	—	February 2, 2005	Socorro	LINEAR	·	3.3 km	MPC · JPL
335188	2005 CH_{57}	—	February 2, 2005	Socorro	LINEAR	·	2.5 km	MPC · JPL
335189	2005 CW_{65}	—	February 9, 2005	Kitt Peak	Spacewatch	·	3.7 km	MPC · JPL
335190	2005 CQ_{80}	—	February 14, 2005	Catalina	CSS	EUP	4.3 km	MPC · JPL
335191	2005 EO	—	March 1, 2005	Goodricke-Pigott	R. A. Tucker	·	2.7 km	MPC · JPL
335192	2005 EC_{24}	—	March 3, 2005	Junk Bond	Junk Bond	EOS	1.9 km	MPC · JPL
335193	2005 EV_{36}	—	March 4, 2005	Mount Lemmon	Mount Lemmon Survey	·	4.7 km	MPC · JPL
335194	2005 EF_{43}	—	March 3, 2005	Kitt Peak	Spacewatch	·	2.8 km	MPC · JPL
335195	2005 EH_{56}	—	March 4, 2005	Kitt Peak	Spacewatch	·	2.9 km	MPC · JPL
335196	2005 EA_{65}	—	March 4, 2005	Socorro	LINEAR	·	750 m	MPC · JPL
335197	2005 EO_{69}	—	March 4, 2005	Catalina	CSS	·	2.6 km	MPC · JPL
335198	2005 EN_{88}	—	March 8, 2005	Kitt Peak	Spacewatch	·	2.9 km	MPC · JPL
335199	2005 EJ_{91}	—	March 8, 2005	Kitt Peak	Spacewatch	EOS	2.6 km	MPC · JPL
335200	2005 EE_{93}	—	March 8, 2005	Socorro	LINEAR	·	2.3 km	MPC · JPL

== 335201–335300 ==
back to top

Designation			Discovery			Properties		Ref
Permanent	Provisional	Named after	Date	Site	Discoverer(s)	Category	Diam.	Ref
335201	2005 EC_{94}	—	March 6, 2005	Ottmarsheim	Ottmarsheim	·	3.8 km	MPC · JPL
335202	2005 EH_{134}	—	March 9, 2005	Mount Lemmon	Mount Lemmon Survey	·	2.1 km	MPC · JPL
335203	2005 EO_{138}	—	March 9, 2005	Socorro	LINEAR	·	4.3 km	MPC · JPL
335204	2005 ED_{142}	—	March 10, 2005	Catalina	CSS	·	3.7 km	MPC · JPL
335205	2005 ER_{145}	—	March 10, 2005	Mount Lemmon	Mount Lemmon Survey	·	610 m	MPC · JPL
335206	2005 EU_{150}	—	March 10, 2005	Kitt Peak	Spacewatch	·	2.8 km	MPC · JPL
335207	2005 EF_{163}	—	March 10, 2005	Mount Lemmon	Mount Lemmon Survey	·	670 m	MPC · JPL
335208	2005 ER_{169}	—	March 12, 2005	Socorro	LINEAR	EUP	6.2 km	MPC · JPL
335209	2005 EH_{175}	—	March 8, 2005	Kitt Peak	Spacewatch	·	3.0 km	MPC · JPL
335210	2005 EO_{182}	—	March 9, 2005	Anderson Mesa	LONEOS	·	2.5 km	MPC · JPL
335211	2005 EH_{203}	—	March 10, 2005	Mount Lemmon	Mount Lemmon Survey	·	3.8 km	MPC · JPL
335212	2005 EW_{217}	—	March 9, 2005	Mount Lemmon	Mount Lemmon Survey	·	2.0 km	MPC · JPL
335213	2005 EE_{223}	—	March 10, 2005	Catalina	CSS	URS	4.8 km	MPC · JPL
335214	2005 EN_{233}	—	March 10, 2005	Anderson Mesa	LONEOS	·	3.9 km	MPC · JPL
335215	2005 EJ_{256}	—	March 11, 2005	Socorro	LINEAR	·	5.2 km	MPC · JPL
335216	2005 EN_{286}	—	March 8, 2005	Socorro	LINEAR	·	5.4 km	MPC · JPL
335217	2005 FL_{11}	—	March 17, 2005	Mount Lemmon	Mount Lemmon Survey	EOS	2.2 km	MPC · JPL
335218	2005 GB_{6}	—	April 1, 2005	Kitt Peak	Spacewatch	·	3.0 km	MPC · JPL
335219	2005 GQ_{11}	—	April 1, 2005	Anderson Mesa	LONEOS	·	800 m	MPC · JPL
335220	2005 GB_{27}	—	April 2, 2005	Palomar	NEAT	·	710 m	MPC · JPL
335221	2005 GP_{28}	—	April 4, 2005	Kitt Peak	Spacewatch	·	3.6 km	MPC · JPL
335222	2005 GY_{37}	—	April 3, 2005	Socorro	LINEAR	·	5.0 km	MPC · JPL
335223	2005 GG_{47}	—	April 5, 2005	Mount Lemmon	Mount Lemmon Survey	·	3.3 km	MPC · JPL
335224	2005 GT_{48}	—	April 5, 2005	Mount Lemmon	Mount Lemmon Survey	·	650 m	MPC · JPL
335225	2005 GE_{73}	—	April 4, 2005	Catalina	CSS	·	3.6 km	MPC · JPL
335226	2005 GS_{81}	—	April 4, 2005	Kitt Peak	Spacewatch	·	2.4 km	MPC · JPL
335227	2005 GW_{88}	—	April 5, 2005	Mount Lemmon	Mount Lemmon Survey	·	3.6 km	MPC · JPL
335228	2005 GH_{101}	—	April 9, 2005	Kitt Peak	Spacewatch	·	3.6 km	MPC · JPL
335229	2005 GY_{109}	—	April 10, 2005	Mount Lemmon	Mount Lemmon Survey	·	890 m	MPC · JPL
335230	2005 GM_{113}	—	April 9, 2005	Mount Lemmon	Mount Lemmon Survey	·	3.7 km	MPC · JPL
335231	2005 GG_{136}	—	April 10, 2005	Kitt Peak	Spacewatch	·	4.0 km	MPC · JPL
335232	2005 GT_{138}	—	April 12, 2005	Kitt Peak	Spacewatch	·	3.6 km	MPC · JPL
335233	2005 GS_{143}	—	April 10, 2005	Kitt Peak	Spacewatch	·	530 m	MPC · JPL
335234	2005 GM_{161}	—	April 13, 2005	Catalina	CSS	·	3.0 km	MPC · JPL
335235	2005 GA_{170}	—	April 12, 2005	Kitt Peak	Spacewatch	·	840 m	MPC · JPL
335236	2005 GF_{190}	—	April 12, 2005	Kitt Peak	M. W. Buie	·	1.6 km	MPC · JPL
335237	2005 GZ_{194}	—	April 10, 2005	Kitt Peak	M. W. Buie	KOR	1.4 km	MPC · JPL
335238	2005 GJ_{207}	—	April 10, 2005	Catalina	CSS	·	4.2 km	MPC · JPL
335239	2005 HE_{9}	—	April 16, 2005	Kitt Peak	Spacewatch	EOS	2.4 km	MPC · JPL
335240	2005 JQ_{95}	—	May 8, 2005	Mount Lemmon	Mount Lemmon Survey	EOS	2.8 km	MPC · JPL
335241	2005 JU_{95}	—	May 8, 2005	Kitt Peak	Spacewatch	·	710 m	MPC · JPL
335242	2005 JJ_{114}	—	April 17, 2005	Kitt Peak	Spacewatch	·	3.3 km	MPC · JPL
335243	2005 JH_{122}	—	May 11, 2005	Palomar	NEAT	·	4.4 km	MPC · JPL
335244	2005 KA_{4}	—	May 17, 2005	Mount Lemmon	Mount Lemmon Survey	·	4.5 km	MPC · JPL
335245	2005 KS_{4}	—	May 3, 2005	Kitt Peak	Spacewatch	·	770 m	MPC · JPL
335246	2005 LL	—	June 1, 2005	Mount Lemmon	Mount Lemmon Survey	·	3.5 km	MPC · JPL
335247	2005 LZ	—	June 1, 2005	Reedy Creek	J. Broughton	·	810 m	MPC · JPL
335248	2005 LX_{7}	—	June 4, 2005	Goodricke-Pigott	R. A. Tucker	PHO	1.6 km	MPC · JPL
335249	2005 LE_{35}	—	June 10, 2005	Kitt Peak	Spacewatch	·	650 m	MPC · JPL
335250	2005 LN_{41}	—	June 12, 2005	Kitt Peak	Spacewatch	·	650 m	MPC · JPL
335251	2005 LW_{47}	—	June 14, 2005	Mount Lemmon	Mount Lemmon Survey	·	700 m	MPC · JPL
335252	2005 LZ_{51}	—	June 15, 2005	Mount Lemmon	Mount Lemmon Survey	·	730 m	MPC · JPL
335253	2005 MN_{4}	—	June 17, 2005	Kitt Peak	Spacewatch	·	3.6 km	MPC · JPL
335254	2005 MG_{20}	—	June 29, 2005	Palomar	NEAT	·	1.0 km	MPC · JPL
335255	2005 MB_{30}	—	June 29, 2005	Kitt Peak	Spacewatch	·	1.2 km	MPC · JPL
335256	2005 MD_{34}	—	June 29, 2005	Palomar	NEAT	·	870 m	MPC · JPL
335257	2005 MK_{38}	—	June 30, 2005	Kitt Peak	Spacewatch	·	1.1 km	MPC · JPL
335258	2005 ML_{41}	—	June 30, 2005	Kitt Peak	Spacewatch	·	730 m	MPC · JPL
335259	2005 MY_{41}	—	June 29, 2005	Kitt Peak	Spacewatch	·	820 m	MPC · JPL
335260	2005 MA_{49}	—	June 29, 2005	Palomar	NEAT	V	650 m	MPC · JPL
335261	2005 MZ_{51}	—	June 30, 2005	Kitt Peak	Spacewatch	·	810 m	MPC · JPL
335262	2005 MU_{53}	—	June 17, 2005	Mount Lemmon	Mount Lemmon Survey	·	630 m	MPC · JPL
335263	2005 MX_{53}	—	June 18, 2005	Mount Lemmon	Mount Lemmon Survey	·	710 m	MPC · JPL
335264	2005 MQ_{54}	—	June 17, 2005	Mount Lemmon	Mount Lemmon Survey	·	830 m	MPC · JPL
335265	2005 NA_{3}	—	July 3, 2005	Mount Lemmon	Mount Lemmon Survey	·	780 m	MPC · JPL
335266	2005 NW_{6}	—	July 4, 2005	Mount Lemmon	Mount Lemmon Survey	PHO	1.0 km	MPC · JPL
335267	2005 NV_{8}	—	June 13, 2005	Mount Lemmon	Mount Lemmon Survey	·	620 m	MPC · JPL
335268	2005 NZ_{9}	—	July 2, 2005	Kitt Peak	Spacewatch	·	700 m	MPC · JPL
335269	2005 NP_{11}	—	July 4, 2005	Palomar	NEAT	·	1.1 km	MPC · JPL
335270	2005 NZ_{16}	—	July 2, 2005	Kitt Peak	Spacewatch	·	1.1 km	MPC · JPL
335271	2005 NC_{17}	—	July 3, 2005	Palomar	NEAT	·	970 m	MPC · JPL
335272	2005 NR_{19}	—	July 5, 2005	Mount Lemmon	Mount Lemmon Survey	·	840 m	MPC · JPL
335273	2005 NW_{21}	—	July 1, 2005	Kitt Peak	Spacewatch	·	840 m	MPC · JPL
335274	2005 NH_{22}	—	July 1, 2005	Kitt Peak	Spacewatch	·	1.2 km	MPC · JPL
335275	2005 NX_{28}	—	July 5, 2005	Palomar	NEAT	·	730 m	MPC · JPL
335276	2005 NR_{57}	—	July 5, 2005	Palomar	NEAT	·	1 km	MPC · JPL
335277	2005 NH_{58}	—	July 6, 2005	Kitt Peak	Spacewatch	·	780 m	MPC · JPL
335278	2005 NA_{65}	—	July 1, 2005	Kitt Peak	Spacewatch	·	760 m	MPC · JPL
335279	2005 NY_{81}	—	July 15, 2005	Kitt Peak	Spacewatch	·	960 m	MPC · JPL
335280	2005 NN_{100}	—	July 12, 2005	Mount Lemmon	Mount Lemmon Survey	V	730 m	MPC · JPL
335281	2005 NG_{123}	—	July 8, 2005	Kitt Peak	Spacewatch	·	770 m	MPC · JPL
335282	2005 OV_{6}	—	July 28, 2005	Palomar	NEAT	·	910 m	MPC · JPL
335283	2005 OJ_{9}	—	June 20, 2005	Palomar	NEAT	·	890 m	MPC · JPL
335284	2005 ON_{10}	—	July 27, 2005	Palomar	NEAT	·	990 m	MPC · JPL
335285	2005 OY_{12}	—	July 29, 2005	Palomar	NEAT	·	910 m	MPC · JPL
335286	2005 OX_{15}	—	July 29, 2005	Palomar	NEAT	·	860 m	MPC · JPL
335287	2005 OE_{20}	—	July 28, 2005	Palomar	NEAT	V	830 m	MPC · JPL
335288	2005 OO_{22}	—	July 31, 2005	Siding Spring	SSS	·	760 m	MPC · JPL
335289	2005 OJ_{26}	—	July 29, 2005	Anderson Mesa	LONEOS	·	860 m	MPC · JPL
335290	2005 OE_{31}	—	July 29, 2005	Anderson Mesa	LONEOS	·	1.1 km	MPC · JPL
335291	2005 PG_{1}	—	August 1, 2005	Siding Spring	SSS	·	1.5 km	MPC · JPL
335292 Larrey	2005 PG_{5}	Larrey	August 3, 2005	Saint-Sulpice	Saint-Sulpice	·	910 m	MPC · JPL
335293	2005 PL_{8}	—	August 4, 2005	Palomar	NEAT	(2076)	960 m	MPC · JPL
335294	2005 PL_{11}	—	August 4, 2005	Palomar	NEAT	·	850 m	MPC · JPL
335295	2005 PV_{19}	—	August 6, 2005	Palomar	NEAT	·	1.1 km	MPC · JPL
335296	2005 QG_{6}	—	August 24, 2005	Palomar	NEAT	·	890 m	MPC · JPL
335297	2005 QJ_{8}	—	August 25, 2005	Palomar	NEAT	·	1 km	MPC · JPL
335298	2005 QE_{10}	—	August 25, 2005	Campo Imperatore	CINEOS	·	840 m	MPC · JPL
335299	2005 QV_{10}	—	August 24, 2005	Palomar	NEAT	·	920 m	MPC · JPL
335300	2005 QG_{11}	—	August 24, 2005	Palomar	NEAT	·	2.1 km	MPC · JPL

== 335301–335400 ==
back to top

Designation			Discovery			Properties		Ref
Permanent	Provisional	Named after	Date	Site	Discoverer(s)	Category	Diam.	Ref
335301	2005 QU_{11}	—	August 22, 2005	Palomar	NEAT	PHO	3.0 km	MPC · JPL
335302	2005 QN_{13}	—	August 24, 2005	Palomar	NEAT	·	1.3 km	MPC · JPL
335303	2005 QL_{15}	—	August 25, 2005	Palomar	NEAT	·	930 m	MPC · JPL
335304	2005 QL_{25}	—	August 27, 2005	Kitt Peak	Spacewatch	·	1.2 km	MPC · JPL
335305	2005 QZ_{29}	—	August 27, 2005	Anderson Mesa	LONEOS	·	980 m	MPC · JPL
335306 Mouhot	2005 QK_{30}	Mouhot	August 28, 2005	Saint-Sulpice	B. Christophe	·	710 m	MPC · JPL
335307	2005 QS_{33}	—	August 25, 2005	Palomar	NEAT	·	910 m	MPC · JPL
335308	2005 QS_{36}	—	August 25, 2005	Palomar	NEAT	·	740 m	MPC · JPL
335309	2005 QM_{37}	—	August 25, 2005	Palomar	NEAT	fast	1.5 km	MPC · JPL
335310	2005 QO_{37}	—	August 25, 2005	Palomar	NEAT	·	1.1 km	MPC · JPL
335311	2005 QX_{39}	—	August 26, 2005	Palomar	NEAT	·	910 m	MPC · JPL
335312	2005 QA_{44}	—	August 26, 2005	Palomar	NEAT	·	1.0 km	MPC · JPL
335313	2005 QS_{45}	—	August 26, 2005	Palomar	NEAT	·	1.0 km	MPC · JPL
335314	2005 QM_{53}	—	August 28, 2005	Kitt Peak	Spacewatch	·	960 m	MPC · JPL
335315	2005 QH_{54}	—	August 28, 2005	Kitt Peak	Spacewatch	·	890 m	MPC · JPL
335316	2005 QZ_{70}	—	August 29, 2005	Socorro	LINEAR	·	1.3 km	MPC · JPL
335317	2005 QH_{74}	—	August 29, 2005	Anderson Mesa	LONEOS	·	1.8 km	MPC · JPL
335318	2005 QY_{79}	—	August 28, 2005	Anderson Mesa	LONEOS	·	1.1 km	MPC · JPL
335319	2005 QH_{83}	—	August 29, 2005	Anderson Mesa	LONEOS	·	1.2 km	MPC · JPL
335320	2005 QR_{83}	—	August 29, 2005	Anderson Mesa	LONEOS	·	1.4 km	MPC · JPL
335321	2005 QQ_{91}	—	August 26, 2005	Anderson Mesa	LONEOS	·	790 m	MPC · JPL
335322	2005 QS_{104}	—	August 27, 2005	Palomar	NEAT	·	1.0 km	MPC · JPL
335323	2005 QV_{108}	—	August 27, 2005	Palomar	NEAT	·	1.4 km	MPC · JPL
335324	2005 QN_{110}	—	August 31, 2005	Kitt Peak	Spacewatch	NYS ·	1.0 km	MPC · JPL
335325	2005 QK_{124}	—	August 28, 2005	Kitt Peak	Spacewatch	·	890 m	MPC · JPL
335326	2005 QX_{132}	—	August 28, 2005	Kitt Peak	Spacewatch	·	840 m	MPC · JPL
335327	2005 QF_{135}	—	August 28, 2005	Kitt Peak	Spacewatch	·	1.3 km	MPC · JPL
335328	2005 QT_{143}	—	August 25, 2005	Palomar	NEAT	·	850 m	MPC · JPL
335329	2005 QM_{155}	—	August 28, 2005	Siding Spring	SSS	·	1.4 km	MPC · JPL
335330	2005 QG_{176}	—	August 31, 2005	Kitt Peak	Spacewatch	·	940 m	MPC · JPL
335331	2005 QO_{188}	—	August 25, 2005	Palomar	NEAT	MAS	700 m	MPC · JPL
335332	2005 RD	—	September 1, 2005	Wrightwood	J. W. Young	V	850 m	MPC · JPL
335333	2005 RR_{11}	—	September 11, 2005	Junk Bond	D. Healy	(2076)	760 m	MPC · JPL
335334	2005 RV_{21}	—	September 6, 2005	Anderson Mesa	LONEOS	·	880 m	MPC · JPL
335335	2005 RW_{21}	—	September 6, 2005	Anderson Mesa	LONEOS	·	1.0 km	MPC · JPL
335336	2005 RZ_{22}	—	September 6, 2005	Socorro	LINEAR	·	1.0 km	MPC · JPL
335337	2005 SM	—	September 22, 2005	Uccle	T. Pauwels	V	700 m	MPC · JPL
335338	2005 SS_{8}	—	September 25, 2005	Kitt Peak	Spacewatch	MAS	760 m	MPC · JPL
335339	2005 SK_{10}	—	September 26, 2005	Socorro	LINEAR	PHO	1.5 km	MPC · JPL
335340	2005 SR_{19}	—	September 24, 2005	Great Shefford	Birtwhistle, P.	·	1.5 km	MPC · JPL
335341	2005 SX_{19}	—	September 25, 2005	Kingsnake	J. V. McClusky	·	1.3 km	MPC · JPL
335342	2005 SB_{23}	—	September 23, 2005	Kitt Peak	Spacewatch	NYS	970 m	MPC · JPL
335343	2005 SD_{35}	—	September 23, 2005	Kitt Peak	Spacewatch	·	900 m	MPC · JPL
335344	2005 SV_{36}	—	September 24, 2005	Kitt Peak	Spacewatch	V	920 m	MPC · JPL
335345	2005 SB_{39}	—	September 24, 2005	Kitt Peak	Spacewatch	NYS	1.2 km	MPC · JPL
335346	2005 SR_{45}	—	September 24, 2005	Kitt Peak	Spacewatch	·	1.3 km	MPC · JPL
335347	2005 SW_{46}	—	September 24, 2005	Kitt Peak	Spacewatch	NYS	1.2 km	MPC · JPL
335348	2005 SQ_{49}	—	September 24, 2005	Kitt Peak	Spacewatch	MAS	750 m	MPC · JPL
335349	2005 SL_{53}	—	September 25, 2005	Catalina	CSS	·	1.0 km	MPC · JPL
335350	2005 SZ_{53}	—	September 25, 2005	Kitt Peak	Spacewatch	MAS · fast	770 m	MPC · JPL
335351	2005 SU_{64}	—	September 26, 2005	Palomar	NEAT	·	1.0 km	MPC · JPL
335352	2005 SN_{66}	—	September 26, 2005	Palomar	NEAT	·	1.4 km	MPC · JPL
335353	2005 SO_{67}	—	September 27, 2005	Kitt Peak	Spacewatch	·	1.1 km	MPC · JPL
335354	2005 SB_{68}	—	September 27, 2005	Kitt Peak	Spacewatch	·	1.4 km	MPC · JPL
335355	2005 SW_{71}	—	September 23, 2005	Kitt Peak	Spacewatch	MAS	1.0 km	MPC · JPL
335356	2005 ST_{93}	—	September 24, 2005	Kitt Peak	Spacewatch	NYS	1.5 km	MPC · JPL
335357	2005 SJ_{98}	—	September 25, 2005	Kitt Peak	Spacewatch	·	1.4 km	MPC · JPL
335358	2005 SB_{103}	—	September 25, 2005	Palomar	NEAT	NYS	1.1 km	MPC · JPL
335359	2005 SN_{105}	—	September 25, 2005	Kitt Peak	Spacewatch	NYS	1.4 km	MPC · JPL
335360	2005 ST_{108}	—	September 26, 2005	Kitt Peak	Spacewatch	MAS	880 m	MPC · JPL
335361	2005 SK_{112}	—	September 26, 2005	Palomar	NEAT	V	950 m	MPC · JPL
335362	2005 SD_{113}	—	September 26, 2005	Palomar	NEAT	V	860 m	MPC · JPL
335363	2005 SD_{117}	—	September 28, 2005	Palomar	NEAT	NYS	1.4 km	MPC · JPL
335364	2005 SS_{124}	—	September 29, 2005	Kitt Peak	Spacewatch	·	1.2 km	MPC · JPL
335365	2005 SM_{133}	—	September 29, 2005	Kitt Peak	Spacewatch	·	1.3 km	MPC · JPL
335366	2005 SK_{145}	—	September 25, 2005	Kitt Peak	Spacewatch	3:2 · SHU	5.4 km	MPC · JPL
335367	2005 ST_{145}	—	September 25, 2005	Kitt Peak	Spacewatch	·	1.3 km	MPC · JPL
335368	2005 SX_{147}	—	September 25, 2005	Kitt Peak	Spacewatch	·	2.5 km	MPC · JPL
335369	2005 SX_{150}	—	September 25, 2005	Kitt Peak	Spacewatch	·	1.1 km	MPC · JPL
335370	2005 SW_{153}	—	September 26, 2005	Kitt Peak	Spacewatch	·	930 m	MPC · JPL
335371	2005 SP_{163}	—	September 27, 2005	Palomar	NEAT	·	1.7 km	MPC · JPL
335372	2005 SE_{167}	—	September 28, 2005	Palomar	NEAT	·	1.2 km	MPC · JPL
335373	2005 SY_{170}	—	September 29, 2005	Kitt Peak	Spacewatch	·	1.4 km	MPC · JPL
335374	2005 SZ_{182}	—	September 29, 2005	Kitt Peak	Spacewatch	NYS	1.0 km	MPC · JPL
335375	2005 SS_{183}	—	September 29, 2005	Kitt Peak	Spacewatch	MAS	810 m	MPC · JPL
335376	2005 SA_{193}	—	September 29, 2005	Catalina	CSS	·	1.4 km	MPC · JPL
335377	2005 SM_{208}	—	September 30, 2005	Kitt Peak	Spacewatch	·	1.2 km	MPC · JPL
335378	2005 SM_{210}	—	September 30, 2005	Palomar	NEAT	·	1.5 km	MPC · JPL
335379	2005 SK_{214}	—	September 30, 2005	Anderson Mesa	LONEOS	·	1.4 km	MPC · JPL
335380	2005 SO_{214}	—	September 30, 2005	Catalina	CSS	·	1.5 km	MPC · JPL
335381	2005 SA_{232}	—	September 30, 2005	Mount Lemmon	Mount Lemmon Survey	MAS	690 m	MPC · JPL
335382	2005 SR_{233}	—	September 30, 2005	Mount Lemmon	Mount Lemmon Survey	MAS	790 m	MPC · JPL
335383	2005 SG_{234}	—	September 29, 2005	Anderson Mesa	LONEOS	·	1.4 km	MPC · JPL
335384	2005 SQ_{253}	—	September 23, 2005	Palomar	NEAT	·	1.4 km	MPC · JPL
335385	2005 SY_{256}	—	September 22, 2005	Palomar	NEAT	·	1.3 km	MPC · JPL
335386	2005 SN_{263}	—	September 23, 2005	Catalina	CSS	·	1.0 km	MPC · JPL
335387	2005 SY_{278}	—	September 26, 2005	Kitt Peak	Spacewatch	·	1.2 km	MPC · JPL
335388	2005 SM_{281}	—	September 30, 2005	Mauna Kea	Mauna Kea	·	1.8 km	MPC · JPL
335389	2005 TV_{2}	—	October 1, 2005	Catalina	CSS	NYS ·	1.7 km	MPC · JPL
335390	2005 TW_{2}	—	October 1, 2005	Catalina	CSS	·	1.3 km	MPC · JPL
335391	2005 TY_{3}	—	October 1, 2005	Anderson Mesa	LONEOS	ERI	1.4 km	MPC · JPL
335392	2005 TF_{5}	—	October 1, 2005	Catalina	CSS	V	680 m	MPC · JPL
335393	2005 TC_{7}	—	October 1, 2005	Mount Lemmon	Mount Lemmon Survey	·	1.3 km	MPC · JPL
335394	2005 TZ_{13}	—	October 1, 2005	Mount Lemmon	Mount Lemmon Survey	·	1.2 km	MPC · JPL
335395	2005 TU_{14}	—	October 3, 2005	Catalina	CSS	·	1.4 km	MPC · JPL
335396	2005 TA_{17}	—	October 1, 2005	Socorro	LINEAR	NYS	1.1 km	MPC · JPL
335397	2005 TE_{18}	—	October 1, 2005	Socorro	LINEAR	NYS	1.2 km	MPC · JPL
335398	2005 TF_{18}	—	October 1, 2005	Socorro	LINEAR	NYS	1.1 km	MPC · JPL
335399	2005 TM_{21}	—	October 1, 2005	Kitt Peak	Spacewatch	MAS	810 m	MPC · JPL
335400	2005 TY_{21}	—	October 1, 2005	Anderson Mesa	LONEOS	·	1.2 km	MPC · JPL

== 335401–335500 ==
back to top

Designation			Discovery			Properties		Ref
Permanent	Provisional	Named after	Date	Site	Discoverer(s)	Category	Diam.	Ref
335401	2005 TM_{27}	—	October 1, 2005	Catalina	CSS	·	1.1 km	MPC · JPL
335402	2005 TS_{27}	—	October 1, 2005	Catalina	CSS	NYS	1.4 km	MPC · JPL
335403	2005 TB_{77}	—	October 5, 2005	Kitt Peak	Spacewatch	·	1.5 km	MPC · JPL
335404	2005 TE_{86}	—	October 3, 2005	Catalina	CSS	·	1.7 km	MPC · JPL
335405	2005 TW_{98}	—	October 7, 2005	Catalina	CSS	·	1.4 km	MPC · JPL
335406	2005 TZ_{98}	—	October 7, 2005	Catalina	CSS	·	1.2 km	MPC · JPL
335407	2005 TC_{108}	—	September 29, 2005	Kitt Peak	Spacewatch	·	1.1 km	MPC · JPL
335408	2005 TM_{108}	—	October 7, 2005	Kitt Peak	Spacewatch	·	980 m	MPC · JPL
335409	2005 TP_{115}	—	October 7, 2005	Kitt Peak	Spacewatch	·	1.0 km	MPC · JPL
335410	2005 TZ_{123}	—	October 7, 2005	Kitt Peak	Spacewatch	·	1.0 km	MPC · JPL
335411	2005 TZ_{129}	—	October 7, 2005	Kitt Peak	Spacewatch	·	1.5 km	MPC · JPL
335412	2005 TU_{131}	—	October 7, 2005	Kitt Peak	Spacewatch	·	1.1 km	MPC · JPL
335413	2005 TG_{169}	—	October 9, 2005	Kitt Peak	Spacewatch	·	1.2 km	MPC · JPL
335414	2005 TO_{193}	—	October 6, 2005	Mount Lemmon	Mount Lemmon Survey	·	1.5 km	MPC · JPL
335415	2005 UT_{1}	—	October 22, 2005	Junk Bond	D. Healy	·	1.3 km	MPC · JPL
335416	2005 UR_{12}	—	October 29, 2005	Andrushivka	Andrushivka	·	1.1 km	MPC · JPL
335417	2005 UH_{16}	—	October 22, 2005	Kitt Peak	Spacewatch	MAS	1.0 km	MPC · JPL
335418	2005 UO_{16}	—	October 22, 2005	Kitt Peak	Spacewatch	·	1.2 km	MPC · JPL
335419	2005 UU_{26}	—	October 23, 2005	Catalina	CSS	·	1.3 km	MPC · JPL
335420	2005 UA_{40}	—	October 24, 2005	Kitt Peak	Spacewatch	MAS	980 m	MPC · JPL
335421	2005 UJ_{42}	—	October 22, 2005	Kitt Peak	Spacewatch	·	1.1 km	MPC · JPL
335422	2005 UU_{48}	—	October 23, 2005	Kitt Peak	Spacewatch	NYS	1.2 km	MPC · JPL
335423	2005 UR_{49}	—	October 23, 2005	Palomar	NEAT	·	1.3 km	MPC · JPL
335424	2005 UN_{52}	—	October 23, 2005	Catalina	CSS	·	1.4 km	MPC · JPL
335425	2005 UJ_{55}	—	October 23, 2005	Catalina	CSS	NYS	1.0 km	MPC · JPL
335426	2005 UA_{61}	—	October 25, 2005	Mount Lemmon	Mount Lemmon Survey	NYS	1.2 km	MPC · JPL
335427	2005 UG_{72}	—	October 23, 2005	Catalina	CSS	·	1.4 km	MPC · JPL
335428	2005 UB_{85}	—	October 22, 2005	Kitt Peak	Spacewatch	NYS	1.3 km	MPC · JPL
335429	2005 UC_{87}	—	October 22, 2005	Kitt Peak	Spacewatch	·	1.4 km	MPC · JPL
335430	2005 UK_{87}	—	October 22, 2005	Kitt Peak	Spacewatch	·	1.4 km	MPC · JPL
335431	2005 UT_{99}	—	October 22, 2005	Kitt Peak	Spacewatch	NYS	1.3 km	MPC · JPL
335432	2005 UA_{162}	—	October 27, 2005	Socorro	LINEAR	·	1.2 km	MPC · JPL
335433	2005 UW_{163}	—	October 24, 2005	Kitt Peak	Spacewatch	NYS · fast	1.3 km	MPC · JPL
335434	2005 UY_{170}	—	October 24, 2005	Kitt Peak	Spacewatch	·	1.5 km	MPC · JPL
335435	2005 UZ_{207}	—	October 27, 2005	Kitt Peak	Spacewatch	MAS	700 m	MPC · JPL
335436	2005 UR_{215}	—	October 25, 2005	Kitt Peak	Spacewatch	NYS	1.3 km	MPC · JPL
335437	2005 UL_{223}	—	October 25, 2005	Kitt Peak	Spacewatch	·	1.5 km	MPC · JPL
335438	2005 UQ_{282}	—	October 26, 2005	Kitt Peak	Spacewatch	·	1.4 km	MPC · JPL
335439	2005 UP_{296}	—	October 26, 2005	Kitt Peak	Spacewatch	·	1.9 km	MPC · JPL
335440	2005 UA_{303}	—	October 26, 2005	Kitt Peak	Spacewatch	ERI	2.0 km	MPC · JPL
335441	2005 US_{304}	—	October 26, 2005	Kitt Peak	Spacewatch	ERI	1.6 km	MPC · JPL
335442	2005 UH_{311}	—	October 29, 2005	Catalina	CSS	PHO	1.2 km	MPC · JPL
335443	2005 UZ_{316}	—	October 27, 2005	Mount Lemmon	Mount Lemmon Survey	·	770 m	MPC · JPL
335444	2005 UY_{350}	—	October 29, 2005	Catalina	CSS	·	1.6 km	MPC · JPL
335445	2005 UV_{354}	—	October 29, 2005	Catalina	CSS	·	1.9 km	MPC · JPL
335446	2005 US_{392}	—	October 30, 2005	Mount Lemmon	Mount Lemmon Survey	·	1.1 km	MPC · JPL
335447	2005 UM_{393}	—	October 27, 2005	Anderson Mesa	LONEOS	·	1.4 km	MPC · JPL
335448	2005 UH_{397}	—	October 28, 2005	Catalina	CSS	MAS	730 m	MPC · JPL
335449	2005 UM_{421}	—	October 5, 2005	Kitt Peak	Spacewatch	·	1.1 km	MPC · JPL
335450	2005 UO_{431}	—	October 28, 2005	Kitt Peak	Spacewatch	SUL	1.8 km	MPC · JPL
335451	2005 UR_{454}	—	October 28, 2005	Catalina	CSS	·	1.3 km	MPC · JPL
335452	2005 UD_{456}	—	October 29, 2005	Catalina	CSS	HIL · 3:2	7.3 km	MPC · JPL
335453	2005 UC_{508}	—	October 27, 2005	Mount Lemmon	Mount Lemmon Survey	T_{j} (2.97) · 3:2	6.5 km	MPC · JPL
335454	2005 UL_{508}	—	October 25, 2005	Mount Lemmon	Mount Lemmon Survey	·	1.0 km	MPC · JPL
335455	2005 UO_{518}	—	October 1, 2005	Apache Point	SDSS Collaboration	T_{j} (2.96) · HIL · 3:2	4.3 km	MPC · JPL
335456	2005 UX_{520}	—	October 26, 2005	Apache Point	A. C. Becker	·	890 m	MPC · JPL
335457	2005 VB_{3}	—	November 1, 2005	Socorro	LINEAR	·	2.4 km	MPC · JPL
335458	2005 VB_{6}	—	November 5, 2005	Catalina	CSS	ERI	2.4 km	MPC · JPL
335459	2005 VZ_{27}	—	November 3, 2005	Mount Lemmon	Mount Lemmon Survey	·	1.4 km	MPC · JPL
335460	2005 VY_{38}	—	November 3, 2005	Mount Lemmon	Mount Lemmon Survey	PHO	1.3 km	MPC · JPL
335461	2005 VB_{61}	—	November 5, 2005	Catalina	CSS	·	1.2 km	MPC · JPL
335462	2005 VC_{87}	—	November 6, 2005	Kitt Peak	Spacewatch	·	1.2 km	MPC · JPL
335463	2005 VH_{89}	—	October 29, 2005	Kitt Peak	Spacewatch	·	1.2 km	MPC · JPL
335464	2005 VY_{118}	—	November 11, 2005	Socorro	LINEAR	PHO	1.5 km	MPC · JPL
335465	2005 VS_{135}	—	November 12, 2005	Kitt Peak	Spacewatch	·	1.6 km	MPC · JPL
335466	2005 WQ	—	November 20, 2005	Wrightwood	J. W. Young	MAS	850 m	MPC · JPL
335467	2005 WB_{27}	—	November 21, 2005	Kitt Peak	Spacewatch	MAS	860 m	MPC · JPL
335468	2005 WU_{35}	—	November 22, 2005	Kitt Peak	Spacewatch	·	1.4 km	MPC · JPL
335469	2005 WB_{63}	—	November 25, 2005	Kitt Peak	Spacewatch	EUN	1.7 km	MPC · JPL
335470	2005 WU_{63}	—	November 25, 2005	Palomar	NEAT	PHO	1.2 km	MPC · JPL
335471	2005 WX_{68}	—	November 25, 2005	Mount Lemmon	Mount Lemmon Survey	EUN	1.3 km	MPC · JPL
335472	2005 WW_{88}	—	November 25, 2005	Kitt Peak	Spacewatch	·	1.3 km	MPC · JPL
335473	2005 WE_{94}	—	November 26, 2005	Kitt Peak	Spacewatch	MAS	610 m	MPC · JPL
335474	2005 WS_{94}	—	November 26, 2005	Kitt Peak	Spacewatch	·	1.4 km	MPC · JPL
335475	2005 WD_{96}	—	November 26, 2005	Kitt Peak	Spacewatch	MAS	860 m	MPC · JPL
335476	2005 WB_{99}	—	November 28, 2005	Mount Lemmon	Mount Lemmon Survey	·	1.8 km	MPC · JPL
335477	2005 WL_{103}	—	November 26, 2005	Catalina	CSS	·	1.4 km	MPC · JPL
335478	2005 WR_{112}	—	November 30, 2005	Mount Lemmon	Mount Lemmon Survey	·	1.1 km	MPC · JPL
335479	2005 WA_{114}	—	November 28, 2005	Mount Lemmon	Mount Lemmon Survey	MAS	770 m	MPC · JPL
335480	2005 WY_{129}	—	November 25, 2005	Mount Lemmon	Mount Lemmon Survey	·	1.1 km	MPC · JPL
335481	2005 WJ_{138}	—	November 26, 2005	Mount Lemmon	Mount Lemmon Survey	CLA	2.1 km	MPC · JPL
335482	2005 WC_{140}	—	November 26, 2005	Mount Lemmon	Mount Lemmon Survey	·	1.1 km	MPC · JPL
335483	2005 WF_{144}	—	November 30, 2005	Palomar	NEAT	·	1.5 km	MPC · JPL
335484	2005 WZ_{149}	—	November 28, 2005	Kitt Peak	Spacewatch	·	1.3 km	MPC · JPL
335485	2005 WD_{154}	—	November 29, 2005	Kitt Peak	Spacewatch	·	1.2 km	MPC · JPL
335486	2005 WO_{177}	—	November 30, 2005	Kitt Peak	Spacewatch	·	2.3 km	MPC · JPL
335487	2005 WF_{194}	—	November 29, 2005	Socorro	LINEAR	·	1.7 km	MPC · JPL
335488	2005 WZ_{203}	—	November 25, 2005	Mount Lemmon	Mount Lemmon Survey	·	2.1 km	MPC · JPL
335489	2005 WL_{210}	—	November 21, 2005	Kitt Peak	Spacewatch	MAS	580 m	MPC · JPL
335490	2005 XG_{5}	—	December 6, 2005	Kitt Peak	Spacewatch	L5	10 km	MPC · JPL
335491	2005 XR_{24}	—	December 2, 2005	Socorro	LINEAR	H	860 m	MPC · JPL
335492	2005 XC_{51}	—	December 2, 2005	Kitt Peak	Spacewatch	·	1.6 km	MPC · JPL
335493	2005 XU_{55}	—	December 5, 2005	Mount Lemmon	Mount Lemmon Survey	·	1.4 km	MPC · JPL
335494	2005 XS_{86}	—	December 8, 2005	Kitt Peak	Spacewatch	MAS	890 m	MPC · JPL
335495	2005 XZ_{114}	—	December 2, 2005	Kitt Peak	Spacewatch	·	2.7 km	MPC · JPL
335496	2005 XK_{115}	—	December 6, 2005	Mount Lemmon	Mount Lemmon Survey	·	1.9 km	MPC · JPL
335497	2005 YK_{5}	—	December 21, 2005	Kitt Peak	Spacewatch	NYS	1.8 km	MPC · JPL
335498	2005 YX_{16}	—	December 22, 2005	Catalina	CSS	H	790 m	MPC · JPL
335499	2005 YB_{28}	—	December 22, 2005	Kitt Peak	Spacewatch	·	1.6 km	MPC · JPL
335500 Espresso	2005 YQ_{29}	Espresso	October 25, 2005	Mount Lemmon	Mount Lemmon Survey	·	1.4 km	MPC · JPL

== 335501–335600 ==
back to top

Designation			Discovery			Properties		Ref
Permanent	Provisional	Named after	Date	Site	Discoverer(s)	Category	Diam.	Ref
335501	2005 YX_{49}	—	December 24, 2005	Kitt Peak	Spacewatch	·	1.9 km	MPC · JPL
335502	2005 YT_{53}	—	December 22, 2005	Kitt Peak	Spacewatch	ADE	2.5 km	MPC · JPL
335503	2005 YJ_{55}	—	December 25, 2005	Kitt Peak	Spacewatch	·	2.0 km	MPC · JPL
335504	2005 YN_{65}	—	December 25, 2005	Kitt Peak	Spacewatch	·	1.3 km	MPC · JPL
335505	2005 YZ_{72}	—	March 10, 2003	Kitt Peak	Spacewatch	MAS	1 km	MPC · JPL
335506	2005 YR_{93}	—	December 26, 2005	Marly	Observatoire Naef	·	1.5 km	MPC · JPL
335507	2005 YF_{114}	—	December 25, 2005	Kitt Peak	Spacewatch	·	1.2 km	MPC · JPL
335508	2005 YJ_{142}	—	December 28, 2005	Mount Lemmon	Mount Lemmon Survey	·	1.7 km	MPC · JPL
335509	2005 YB_{143}	—	December 28, 2005	Mount Lemmon	Mount Lemmon Survey	L5	12 km	MPC · JPL
335510	2005 YO_{144}	—	December 28, 2005	Mount Lemmon	Mount Lemmon Survey	H	650 m	MPC · JPL
335511	2005 YA_{145}	—	December 19, 2001	Palomar	NEAT	·	1.1 km	MPC · JPL
335512	2005 YF_{168}	—	December 28, 2005	Kitt Peak	Spacewatch	·	1.1 km	MPC · JPL
335513	2005 YR_{169}	—	November 26, 2005	Mount Lemmon	Mount Lemmon Survey	H	920 m	MPC · JPL
335514	2005 YW_{169}	—	December 31, 2005	Kitt Peak	Spacewatch	·	1.7 km	MPC · JPL
335515	2005 YP_{182}	—	December 30, 2005	Socorro	LINEAR	RAF	1.3 km	MPC · JPL
335516	2005 YT_{199}	—	December 25, 2005	Mount Lemmon	Mount Lemmon Survey	·	2.2 km	MPC · JPL
335517	2005 YZ_{206}	—	December 27, 2005	Mount Lemmon	Mount Lemmon Survey	ADE	3.2 km	MPC · JPL
335518	2005 YC_{211}	—	December 25, 2005	Anderson Mesa	LONEOS	·	3.3 km	MPC · JPL
335519	2005 YZ_{217}	—	December 31, 2005	Mount Lemmon	Mount Lemmon Survey	·	1.1 km	MPC · JPL
335520	2005 YT_{241}	—	December 30, 2005	Kitt Peak	Spacewatch	·	1.2 km	MPC · JPL
335521	2005 YB_{257}	—	December 30, 2005	Kitt Peak	Spacewatch	EUN	1.8 km	MPC · JPL
335522	2005 YA_{268}	—	December 25, 2005	Mount Lemmon	Mount Lemmon Survey	·	3.8 km	MPC · JPL
335523	2006 AY_{13}	—	January 5, 2006	Mount Lemmon	Mount Lemmon Survey	·	1.7 km	MPC · JPL
335524	2006 AK_{23}	—	January 4, 2006	Kitt Peak	Spacewatch	·	1.6 km	MPC · JPL
335525	2006 AZ_{23}	—	January 4, 2006	Catalina	CSS	HNS	1.2 km	MPC · JPL
335526	2006 AD_{25}	—	January 5, 2006	Kitt Peak	Spacewatch	KON	3.9 km	MPC · JPL
335527	2006 AV_{27}	—	January 5, 2006	Mount Lemmon	Mount Lemmon Survey	·	1.3 km	MPC · JPL
335528	2006 AN_{31}	—	January 5, 2006	Catalina	CSS	·	2.8 km	MPC · JPL
335529	2006 AE_{57}	—	January 8, 2006	Kitt Peak	Spacewatch	·	1.4 km	MPC · JPL
335530	2006 AH_{59}	—	January 4, 2006	Mount Lemmon	Mount Lemmon Survey	DOR	2.8 km	MPC · JPL
335531	2006 AA_{72}	—	January 6, 2006	Kitt Peak	Spacewatch	·	1.6 km	MPC · JPL
335532	2006 AT_{81}	—	January 6, 2006	Anderson Mesa	LONEOS	BAR	1.8 km	MPC · JPL
335533 Tarasprystavski	2006 AH_{83}	Tarasprystavski	January 4, 2006	Catalina	CSS	·	3.0 km	MPC · JPL
335534	2006 AA_{86}	—	January 12, 2006	Palomar	NEAT	ADE	3.4 km	MPC · JPL
335535	2006 AW_{93}	—	January 7, 2006	Mount Lemmon	Mount Lemmon Survey	·	2.5 km	MPC · JPL
335536	2006 AJ_{100}	—	January 7, 2006	Mount Lemmon	Mount Lemmon Survey	·	1.7 km	MPC · JPL
335537	2006 AE_{105}	—	January 5, 2006	Mount Lemmon	Mount Lemmon Survey	L5	10 km	MPC · JPL
335538	2006 BK_{2}	—	January 20, 2006	Kitt Peak	Spacewatch	·	2.1 km	MPC · JPL
335539	2006 BT_{5}	—	January 8, 2006	Catalina	CSS	H	870 m	MPC · JPL
335540	2006 BY_{5}	—	January 18, 2006	Catalina	CSS	·	1.8 km	MPC · JPL
335541	2006 BC_{32}	—	January 20, 2006	Kitt Peak	Spacewatch	ADE	2.3 km	MPC · JPL
335542	2006 BL_{33}	—	January 21, 2006	Kitt Peak	Spacewatch	·	3.0 km	MPC · JPL
335543	2006 BO_{43}	—	January 23, 2006	Catalina	CSS	H	680 m	MPC · JPL
335544	2006 BK_{62}	—	January 22, 2006	Catalina	CSS	H	760 m	MPC · JPL
335545	2006 BA_{69}	—	January 23, 2006	Kitt Peak	Spacewatch	·	1.7 km	MPC · JPL
335546	2006 BT_{78}	—	January 23, 2006	Kitt Peak	Spacewatch	·	1.8 km	MPC · JPL
335547	2006 BA_{90}	—	January 25, 2006	Kitt Peak	Spacewatch	·	1.3 km	MPC · JPL
335548	2006 BP_{98}	—	January 26, 2006	Mount Lemmon	Mount Lemmon Survey	BAR	2.2 km	MPC · JPL
335549	2006 BC_{114}	—	January 25, 2006	Kitt Peak	Spacewatch	·	1.1 km	MPC · JPL
335550	2006 BX_{123}	—	August 22, 2003	Palomar	NEAT	·	2.0 km	MPC · JPL
335551	2006 BZ_{125}	—	January 26, 2006	Kitt Peak	Spacewatch	HNS	1.5 km	MPC · JPL
335552	2006 BS_{129}	—	January 26, 2006	Mount Lemmon	Mount Lemmon Survey	·	2.6 km	MPC · JPL
335553	2006 BK_{133}	—	January 26, 2006	Kitt Peak	Spacewatch	PAD	2.9 km	MPC · JPL
335554	2006 BO_{142}	—	January 26, 2006	Mount Lemmon	Mount Lemmon Survey	·	2.8 km	MPC · JPL
335555	2006 BG_{149}	—	January 23, 2006	Socorro	LINEAR	·	5.0 km	MPC · JPL
335556	2006 BV_{157}	—	January 25, 2006	Kitt Peak	Spacewatch	·	2.2 km	MPC · JPL
335557	2006 BQ_{193}	—	January 30, 2006	Kitt Peak	Spacewatch	L5	7.9 km	MPC · JPL
335558	2006 BC_{194}	—	January 30, 2006	Kitt Peak	Spacewatch	L5	9.0 km	MPC · JPL
335559	2006 BL_{220}	—	January 30, 2006	Kitt Peak	Spacewatch	·	1.5 km	MPC · JPL
335560	2006 BT_{228}	—	January 31, 2006	Kitt Peak	Spacewatch	·	1.7 km	MPC · JPL
335561	2006 BU_{249}	—	January 31, 2006	Mount Lemmon	Mount Lemmon Survey	L5	10 km	MPC · JPL
335562	2006 BP_{252}	—	January 31, 2006	Kitt Peak	Spacewatch	(5)	1.1 km	MPC · JPL
335563	2006 BQ_{253}	—	January 31, 2006	Kitt Peak	Spacewatch	·	2.7 km	MPC · JPL
335564	2006 BL_{262}	—	January 31, 2006	Kitt Peak	Spacewatch	(13314)	2.0 km	MPC · JPL
335565	2006 BO_{267}	—	January 26, 2006	Catalina	CSS	·	2.6 km	MPC · JPL
335566	2006 CJ_{1}	—	February 1, 2006	Kitt Peak	Spacewatch	·	2.1 km	MPC · JPL
335567	2006 CK_{5}	—	February 1, 2006	Kitt Peak	Spacewatch	L5	17 km	MPC · JPL
335568	2006 CG_{20}	—	February 1, 2006	Mount Lemmon	Mount Lemmon Survey	·	2.2 km	MPC · JPL
335569	2006 CR_{22}	—	February 1, 2006	Mount Lemmon	Mount Lemmon Survey	·	1.7 km	MPC · JPL
335570	2006 CB_{39}	—	February 2, 2006	Kitt Peak	Spacewatch	·	1.7 km	MPC · JPL
335571	2006 CB_{40}	—	February 2, 2006	Mount Lemmon	Mount Lemmon Survey	·	2.5 km	MPC · JPL
335572	2006 CC_{47}	—	February 3, 2006	Kitt Peak	Spacewatch	·	1.7 km	MPC · JPL
335573	2006 CQ_{47}	—	January 20, 2006	Kitt Peak	Spacewatch	·	1.4 km	MPC · JPL
335574	2006 CJ_{51}	—	February 4, 2006	Kitt Peak	Spacewatch	L5	10 km	MPC · JPL
335575	2006 DH_{2}	—	February 20, 2006	Kitt Peak	Spacewatch	·	2.3 km	MPC · JPL
335576	2006 DC_{4}	—	February 20, 2006	Catalina	CSS	·	2.2 km	MPC · JPL
335577	2006 DE_{4}	—	February 20, 2006	Catalina	CSS	·	2.3 km	MPC · JPL
335578	2006 DK_{13}	—	February 22, 2006	Catalina	CSS	·	2.2 km	MPC · JPL
335579	2006 DK_{20}	—	January 23, 2006	Kitt Peak	Spacewatch	·	1.3 km	MPC · JPL
335580	2006 DQ_{22}	—	February 20, 2006	Kitt Peak	Spacewatch	·	2.0 km	MPC · JPL
335581	2006 DM_{23}	—	February 20, 2006	Kitt Peak	Spacewatch	·	2.3 km	MPC · JPL
335582	2006 DJ_{29}	—	February 20, 2006	Mount Lemmon	Mount Lemmon Survey	·	1.9 km	MPC · JPL
335583	2006 DR_{40}	—	February 4, 2006	Mount Lemmon	Mount Lemmon Survey	·	2.1 km	MPC · JPL
335584	2006 DL_{41}	—	February 23, 2006	Anderson Mesa	LONEOS	·	1 km	MPC · JPL
335585	2006 DC_{57}	—	February 24, 2006	Kitt Peak	Spacewatch	·	2.0 km	MPC · JPL
335586	2006 DF_{61}	—	February 24, 2006	Kitt Peak	Spacewatch	·	2.3 km	MPC · JPL
335587	2006 DG_{66}	—	February 22, 2006	Anderson Mesa	LONEOS	GEF	1.8 km	MPC · JPL
335588	2006 DU_{67}	—	February 23, 2006	Socorro	LINEAR	·	3.6 km	MPC · JPL
335589	2006 DF_{88}	—	February 24, 2006	Kitt Peak	Spacewatch	·	2.4 km	MPC · JPL
335590	2006 DV_{123}	—	February 24, 2006	Mount Lemmon	Mount Lemmon Survey	·	4.4 km	MPC · JPL
335591	2006 DY_{131}	—	February 25, 2006	Kitt Peak	Spacewatch	(5)	1.3 km	MPC · JPL
335592	2006 DE_{133}	—	February 25, 2006	Kitt Peak	Spacewatch	·	1.7 km	MPC · JPL
335593	2006 DM_{140}	—	February 2, 2006	Mount Lemmon	Mount Lemmon Survey	·	2.8 km	MPC · JPL
335594	2006 DL_{153}	—	February 25, 2006	Kitt Peak	Spacewatch	·	1.8 km	MPC · JPL
335595	2006 DV_{155}	—	November 4, 2005	Kitt Peak	Spacewatch	·	3.1 km	MPC · JPL
335596	2006 DA_{160}	—	February 27, 2006	Kitt Peak	Spacewatch	·	2.2 km	MPC · JPL
335597	2006 DM_{171}	—	February 27, 2006	Kitt Peak	Spacewatch	·	2.2 km	MPC · JPL
335598	2006 DD_{202}	—	February 20, 2006	Catalina	CSS	AGN	1.8 km	MPC · JPL
335599	2006 DY_{216}	—	February 20, 2006	Mount Lemmon	Mount Lemmon Survey	·	2.7 km	MPC · JPL
335600	2006 EO_{1}	—	March 2, 2006	Mount Nyukasa	Japan Aerospace Exploration Agency	·	2.8 km	MPC · JPL

== 335601–335700 ==
back to top

Designation			Discovery			Properties		Ref
Permanent	Provisional	Named after	Date	Site	Discoverer(s)	Category	Diam.	Ref
335601	2006 EX_{17}	—	March 2, 2006	Kitt Peak	Spacewatch	·	1.8 km	MPC · JPL
335602	2006 EO_{20}	—	March 3, 2006	Kitt Peak	Spacewatch	·	1.7 km	MPC · JPL
335603	2006 EY_{23}	—	January 21, 2006	Kitt Peak	Spacewatch	·	2.2 km	MPC · JPL
335604	2006 EH_{33}	—	March 3, 2006	Mount Lemmon	Mount Lemmon Survey	·	2.9 km	MPC · JPL
335605	2006 EW_{34}	—	March 3, 2006	Kitt Peak	Spacewatch	·	2.5 km	MPC · JPL
335606	2006 EK_{42}	—	March 4, 2006	Kitt Peak	Spacewatch	·	2.7 km	MPC · JPL
335607	2006 EW_{42}	—	March 4, 2006	Kitt Peak	Spacewatch	·	2.4 km	MPC · JPL
335608	2006 EN_{52}	—	February 7, 2006	Kitt Peak	Spacewatch	·	2.1 km	MPC · JPL
335609	2006 EA_{53}	—	March 2, 2006	Kitt Peak	Spacewatch	AGN	1.2 km	MPC · JPL
335610	2006 EL_{63}	—	March 5, 2006	Kitt Peak	Spacewatch	·	2.1 km	MPC · JPL
335611	2006 EW_{71}	—	March 2, 2006	Mount Lemmon	Mount Lemmon Survey	AGN	1.5 km	MPC · JPL
335612	2006 EN_{74}	—	March 5, 2006	Kitt Peak	Spacewatch	·	2.3 km	MPC · JPL
335613	2006 FM_{9}	—	March 26, 2006	Siding Spring	SSS	·	4.7 km	MPC · JPL
335614	2006 FG_{15}	—	March 23, 2006	Mount Lemmon	Mount Lemmon Survey	·	2.0 km	MPC · JPL
335615	2006 FF_{18}	—	March 23, 2006	Kitt Peak	Spacewatch	·	2.8 km	MPC · JPL
335616	2006 FG_{33}	—	March 25, 2006	Mount Lemmon	Mount Lemmon Survey	·	2.5 km	MPC · JPL
335617	2006 FQ_{42}	—	March 26, 2006	Mount Lemmon	Mount Lemmon Survey	·	2.4 km	MPC · JPL
335618	2006 GE_{11}	—	March 23, 2006	Kitt Peak	Spacewatch	KOR	1.4 km	MPC · JPL
335619	2006 GJ_{21}	—	April 2, 2006	Mount Lemmon	Mount Lemmon Survey	·	3.4 km	MPC · JPL
335620	2006 GZ_{26}	—	April 2, 2006	Kitt Peak	Spacewatch	T_{j} (2.97)	3.6 km	MPC · JPL
335621	2006 GA_{37}	—	April 8, 2006	Mount Lemmon	Mount Lemmon Survey	AGN	1.3 km	MPC · JPL
335622	2006 HM_{4}	—	April 19, 2006	Anderson Mesa	LONEOS	·	2.1 km	MPC · JPL
335623	2006 HZ_{4}	—	April 19, 2006	Mount Lemmon	Mount Lemmon Survey	·	2.4 km	MPC · JPL
335624	2006 HW_{26}	—	April 20, 2006	Kitt Peak	Spacewatch	·	3.0 km	MPC · JPL
335625	2006 HD_{27}	—	April 20, 2006	Kitt Peak	Spacewatch	·	2.2 km	MPC · JPL
335626	2006 HC_{51}	—	April 24, 2006	Reedy Creek	J. Broughton	·	3.1 km	MPC · JPL
335627	2006 HW_{62}	—	April 24, 2006	Kitt Peak	Spacewatch	KOR	1.4 km	MPC · JPL
335628	2006 HH_{69}	—	April 24, 2006	Mount Lemmon	Mount Lemmon Survey	·	4.2 km	MPC · JPL
335629	2006 HF_{153}	—	April 29, 2006	Kitt Peak	Spacewatch	EOS	2.2 km	MPC · JPL
335630	2006 JM_{3}	—	May 2, 2006	Mount Lemmon	Mount Lemmon Survey	·	2.5 km	MPC · JPL
335631	2006 JY_{11}	—	May 1, 2006	Kitt Peak	Spacewatch	·	3.6 km	MPC · JPL
335632	2006 JY_{15}	—	May 2, 2006	Mount Lemmon	Mount Lemmon Survey	KOR	1.8 km	MPC · JPL
335633	2006 JN_{20}	—	May 2, 2006	Kitt Peak	Spacewatch	·	3.0 km	MPC · JPL
335634	2006 JR_{20}	—	April 24, 2006	Kitt Peak	Spacewatch	·	2.1 km	MPC · JPL
335635	2006 JB_{28}	—	May 2, 2006	Kitt Peak	Spacewatch	·	2.2 km	MPC · JPL
335636	2006 JZ_{35}	—	May 4, 2006	Kitt Peak	Spacewatch	·	2.2 km	MPC · JPL
335637	2006 KP_{6}	—	May 19, 2006	Mount Lemmon	Mount Lemmon Survey	THM	2.6 km	MPC · JPL
335638	2006 KQ_{19}	—	May 22, 2006	Kitt Peak	Spacewatch	·	2.4 km	MPC · JPL
335639	2006 KR_{19}	—	May 22, 2006	Kitt Peak	Spacewatch	·	3.5 km	MPC · JPL
335640	2006 KC_{28}	—	May 20, 2006	Kitt Peak	Spacewatch	·	2.6 km	MPC · JPL
335641	2006 KD_{32}	—	May 20, 2006	Kitt Peak	Spacewatch	KOR	1.6 km	MPC · JPL
335642	2006 KH_{36}	—	May 21, 2006	Kitt Peak	Spacewatch	·	1.8 km	MPC · JPL
335643	2006 KM_{43}	—	May 6, 2006	Mount Lemmon	Mount Lemmon Survey	·	2.2 km	MPC · JPL
335644	2006 KQ_{52}	—	May 21, 2006	Kitt Peak	Spacewatch	·	2.3 km	MPC · JPL
335645	2006 KP_{55}	—	May 21, 2006	Kitt Peak	Spacewatch	·	3.3 km	MPC · JPL
335646	2006 KC_{64}	—	May 23, 2006	Kitt Peak	Spacewatch	EOS	1.8 km	MPC · JPL
335647	2006 KU_{69}	—	May 22, 2006	Kitt Peak	Spacewatch	·	1.8 km	MPC · JPL
335648	2006 KB_{111}	—	May 31, 2006	Mount Lemmon	Mount Lemmon Survey	EOS	1.8 km	MPC · JPL
335649	2006 KG_{119}	—	May 31, 2006	Kitt Peak	Spacewatch	EOS	2.0 km	MPC · JPL
335650	2006 LE_{3}	—	June 15, 2006	Kitt Peak	Spacewatch	·	4.2 km	MPC · JPL
335651	2006 OK	—	August 25, 1995	Kitt Peak	Spacewatch	THB	3.8 km	MPC · JPL
335652	2006 OF_{11}	—	July 20, 2006	Palomar	NEAT	·	4.6 km	MPC · JPL
335653	2006 PU_{1}	—	August 12, 2006	Palomar	NEAT	·	6.8 km	MPC · JPL
335654	2006 PY_{3}	—	August 14, 2006	Reedy Creek	J. Broughton	T_{j} (2.99)	6.5 km	MPC · JPL
335655	2006 PE_{29}	—	August 12, 2006	Palomar	NEAT	TIR	3.7 km	MPC · JPL
335656	2006 QL_{5}	—	August 19, 2006	Kitt Peak	Spacewatch	·	5.6 km	MPC · JPL
335657	2006 QU_{19}	—	August 18, 2006	Socorro	LINEAR	·	5.6 km	MPC · JPL
335658	2006 QC_{69}	—	August 21, 2006	Kitt Peak	Spacewatch	·	2.6 km	MPC · JPL
335659	2006 RZ_{25}	—	September 14, 2006	Kitt Peak	Spacewatch	·	3.9 km	MPC · JPL
335660	2006 SX_{1}	—	September 16, 2006	Catalina	CSS	CYB	6.0 km	MPC · JPL
335661	2006 SE_{63}	—	September 19, 2006	Anderson Mesa	LONEOS	·	3.5 km	MPC · JPL
335662	2006 SZ_{128}	—	September 17, 2006	Catalina	CSS	·	4.7 km	MPC · JPL
335663	2006 SP_{135}	—	September 20, 2006	Anderson Mesa	LONEOS	CYB	5.2 km	MPC · JPL
335664	2006 SK_{139}	—	September 21, 2006	Anderson Mesa	LONEOS	·	780 m	MPC · JPL
335665	2006 SA_{152}	—	September 19, 2006	Kitt Peak	Spacewatch	·	3.4 km	MPC · JPL
335666	2006 SQ_{171}	—	September 25, 2006	Kitt Peak	Spacewatch	(260) · CYB	6.5 km	MPC · JPL
335667	2006 SM_{213}	—	September 27, 2006	Kitt Peak	Spacewatch	·	920 m	MPC · JPL
335668 Ignalina	2006 ST_{372}	Ignalina	September 24, 2006	Moletai	K. Černis, J. Zdanavičius	·	840 m	MPC · JPL
335669	2006 TS_{17}	—	October 11, 2006	Kitt Peak	Spacewatch	·	640 m	MPC · JPL
335670	2006 TH_{22}	—	October 11, 2006	Kitt Peak	Spacewatch	·	910 m	MPC · JPL
335671	2006 TS_{91}	—	October 13, 2006	Kitt Peak	Spacewatch	·	980 m	MPC · JPL
335672	2006 UT_{45}	—	October 16, 2006	Kitt Peak	Spacewatch	·	1.1 km	MPC · JPL
335673	2006 UG_{246}	—	October 27, 2006	Mount Lemmon	Mount Lemmon Survey	·	670 m	MPC · JPL
335674	2006 UP_{246}	—	October 27, 2006	Mount Lemmon	Mount Lemmon Survey	·	680 m	MPC · JPL
335675	2006 UJ_{278}	—	October 28, 2006	Kitt Peak	Spacewatch	·	700 m	MPC · JPL
335676	2006 UP_{279}	—	October 28, 2006	Mount Lemmon	Mount Lemmon Survey	·	700 m	MPC · JPL
335677	2006 UM_{338}	—	October 28, 2006	Mount Lemmon	Mount Lemmon Survey	·	1.5 km	MPC · JPL
335678	2006 UE_{361}	—	October 19, 2006	Catalina	CSS	·	850 m	MPC · JPL
335679	2006 VR_{20}	—	November 9, 2006	Kitt Peak	Spacewatch	·	590 m	MPC · JPL
335680	2006 VV_{47}	—	November 10, 2006	Kitt Peak	Spacewatch	·	750 m	MPC · JPL
335681	2006 VA_{59}	—	November 11, 2006	Kitt Peak	Spacewatch	·	910 m	MPC · JPL
335682	2006 VZ_{59}	—	November 11, 2006	Kitt Peak	Spacewatch	·	1.1 km	MPC · JPL
335683	2006 VL_{63}	—	November 11, 2006	Kitt Peak	Spacewatch	·	780 m	MPC · JPL
335684	2006 VA_{101}	—	October 22, 2006	Catalina	CSS	·	1.0 km	MPC · JPL
335685	2006 VL_{101}	—	August 18, 2002	Palomar	NEAT	·	890 m	MPC · JPL
335686	2006 VU_{169}	—	November 11, 2006	Kitt Peak	Spacewatch	·	1.4 km	MPC · JPL
335687	2006 WD_{39}	—	April 16, 2005	Kitt Peak	Spacewatch	NYS	1.5 km	MPC · JPL
335688	2006 WG_{56}	—	November 16, 2006	Mount Lemmon	Mount Lemmon Survey	·	1.5 km	MPC · JPL
335689	2006 WQ_{102}	—	November 19, 2006	Kitt Peak	Spacewatch	·	760 m	MPC · JPL
335690	2006 WZ_{128}	—	November 27, 2006	7300	W. K. Y. Yeung	·	1.2 km	MPC · JPL
335691	2006 WK_{153}	—	November 21, 2006	Mount Lemmon	Mount Lemmon Survey	·	770 m	MPC · JPL
335692	2006 WA_{155}	—	November 22, 2006	Kitt Peak	Spacewatch	·	870 m	MPC · JPL
335693	2006 WO_{168}	—	November 23, 2006	Kitt Peak	Spacewatch	·	570 m	MPC · JPL
335694	2006 WC_{193}	—	November 27, 2006	Kitt Peak	Spacewatch	·	660 m	MPC · JPL
335695	2006 WA_{204}	—	November 28, 2006	Mount Lemmon	Mount Lemmon Survey	·	840 m	MPC · JPL
335696	2006 WZ_{205}	—	November 16, 2006	Mount Lemmon	Mount Lemmon Survey	·	1.7 km	MPC · JPL
335697	2006 XL_{1}	—	December 11, 2006	7300	W. K. Y. Yeung	·	640 m	MPC · JPL
335698	2006 XH_{19}	—	December 11, 2006	Kitt Peak	Spacewatch	·	590 m	MPC · JPL
335699	2006 XU_{51}	—	December 14, 2006	Mount Lemmon	Mount Lemmon Survey	·	870 m	MPC · JPL
335700	2006 XG_{69}	—	December 15, 2006	Kitt Peak	Spacewatch	V	750 m	MPC · JPL

== 335701–335800 ==
back to top

Designation			Discovery			Properties		Ref
Permanent	Provisional	Named after	Date	Site	Discoverer(s)	Category	Diam.	Ref
335701	2006 YC_{10}	—	December 21, 2006	Catalina	CSS	·	830 m	MPC · JPL
335702	2006 YM_{15}	—	December 20, 2006	Palomar	NEAT	·	810 m	MPC · JPL
335703	2006 YD_{36}	—	December 21, 2006	Kitt Peak	Spacewatch	·	1.7 km	MPC · JPL
335704	2006 YX_{53}	—	December 27, 2006	Mount Lemmon	Mount Lemmon Survey	·	1.6 km	MPC · JPL
335705	2007 AS	—	January 8, 2007	Mount Lemmon	Mount Lemmon Survey	PHO	1.6 km	MPC · JPL
335706	2007 AS_{3}	—	January 8, 2007	Kitt Peak	Spacewatch	·	930 m	MPC · JPL
335707	2007 AG_{4}	—	January 8, 2007	Catalina	CSS	·	950 m	MPC · JPL
335708	2007 AM_{28}	—	January 9, 2007	Kitt Peak	Spacewatch	MAS	800 m	MPC · JPL
335709	2007 BB_{10}	—	January 17, 2007	Kitt Peak	Spacewatch	·	920 m	MPC · JPL
335710	2007 BZ_{41}	—	January 24, 2007	Catalina	CSS	·	1.3 km	MPC · JPL
335711	2007 BT_{48}	—	January 26, 2007	Kitt Peak	Spacewatch	V	980 m	MPC · JPL
335712	2007 BO_{75}	—	January 17, 2007	Kitt Peak	Spacewatch	·	610 m	MPC · JPL
335713	2007 CK_{4}	—	January 26, 2007	Kitt Peak	Spacewatch	·	1.7 km	MPC · JPL
335714	2007 CT_{4}	—	February 6, 2007	Mount Lemmon	Mount Lemmon Survey	·	680 m	MPC · JPL
335715	2007 CL_{6}	—	February 6, 2007	Kitt Peak	Spacewatch	·	1.4 km	MPC · JPL
335716	2007 CV_{7}	—	February 6, 2007	Kitt Peak	Spacewatch	V	630 m	MPC · JPL
335717	2007 CF_{17}	—	February 8, 2007	Kitt Peak	Spacewatch	·	1.7 km	MPC · JPL
335718	2007 CD_{20}	—	December 27, 2006	Mount Lemmon	Mount Lemmon Survey	·	1.9 km	MPC · JPL
335719	2007 CZ_{24}	—	February 8, 2007	Catalina	CSS	·	1.5 km	MPC · JPL
335720	2007 CU_{38}	—	February 6, 2007	Mount Lemmon	Mount Lemmon Survey	NYS	1.1 km	MPC · JPL
335721	2007 CJ_{41}	—	January 28, 2007	Mount Lemmon	Mount Lemmon Survey	·	1.3 km	MPC · JPL
335722	2007 CS_{53}	—	February 15, 2007	Palomar	NEAT	·	1.0 km	MPC · JPL
335723	2007 CJ_{59}	—	February 10, 2007	Catalina	CSS	·	1.8 km	MPC · JPL
335724	2007 CZ_{62}	—	January 17, 2007	Kitt Peak	Spacewatch	V	830 m	MPC · JPL
335725	2007 DP_{11}	—	February 20, 2007	Vicques	M. Ory	NYS	1.1 km	MPC · JPL
335726	2007 DU_{15}	—	February 17, 2007	Kitt Peak	Spacewatch	V	870 m	MPC · JPL
335727	2007 DE_{29}	—	February 17, 2007	Kitt Peak	Spacewatch	·	1.6 km	MPC · JPL
335728	2007 DX_{32}	—	February 17, 2007	Kitt Peak	Spacewatch	·	1.5 km	MPC · JPL
335729	2007 DG_{36}	—	February 17, 2007	Mount Lemmon	Mount Lemmon Survey	·	1.1 km	MPC · JPL
335730	2007 DL_{36}	—	February 17, 2007	Kitt Peak	Spacewatch	L5	10 km	MPC · JPL
335731	2007 DS_{45}	—	February 21, 2007	Kitt Peak	Spacewatch	·	800 m	MPC · JPL
335732	2007 DG_{50}	—	February 16, 2007	Palomar	NEAT	MAS	770 m	MPC · JPL
335733	2007 DR_{60}	—	January 30, 2007	Siding Spring	SSS	·	2.5 km	MPC · JPL
335734	2007 DE_{82}	—	February 23, 2007	Mount Lemmon	Mount Lemmon Survey	MAS	740 m	MPC · JPL
335735	2007 DS_{86}	—	February 23, 2007	Mount Lemmon	Mount Lemmon Survey	·	1.7 km	MPC · JPL
335736	2007 DA_{91}	—	February 23, 2007	Mount Lemmon	Mount Lemmon Survey	·	760 m	MPC · JPL
335737	2007 DB_{102}	—	February 24, 2007	Mount Nyukasa	Japan Aerospace Exploration Agency	·	1.6 km	MPC · JPL
335738	2007 DA_{111}	—	February 23, 2007	Mount Lemmon	Mount Lemmon Survey	·	1.2 km	MPC · JPL
335739	2007 DD_{116}	—	February 27, 2007	Kitt Peak	Spacewatch	L5	9.1 km	MPC · JPL
335740	2007 EJ_{2}	—	March 9, 2007	Kitt Peak	Spacewatch	·	1.4 km	MPC · JPL
335741	2007 EH_{7}	—	March 9, 2007	Mount Lemmon	Mount Lemmon Survey	·	1.3 km	MPC · JPL
335742	2007 EW_{11}	—	January 27, 2007	Mount Lemmon	Mount Lemmon Survey	NYS	1.3 km	MPC · JPL
335743	2007 EY_{13}	—	March 9, 2007	Kitt Peak	Spacewatch	·	1.8 km	MPC · JPL
335744	2007 EQ_{16}	—	March 9, 2007	Kitt Peak	Spacewatch	·	1.5 km	MPC · JPL
335745	2007 EW_{22}	—	February 23, 2007	Mount Lemmon	Mount Lemmon Survey	·	1.5 km	MPC · JPL
335746	2007 EJ_{26}	—	March 11, 2007	Catalina	CSS	AMO	770 m	MPC · JPL
335747	2007 EA_{39}	—	March 12, 2007	Mount Lemmon	Mount Lemmon Survey	·	1.2 km	MPC · JPL
335748	2007 EH_{44}	—	March 9, 2007	Kitt Peak	Spacewatch	·	1.1 km	MPC · JPL
335749	2007 ER_{47}	—	March 9, 2007	Mount Lemmon	Mount Lemmon Survey	·	1.5 km	MPC · JPL
335750	2007 EH_{49}	—	March 10, 2007	Kitt Peak	Spacewatch	·	1.1 km	MPC · JPL
335751	2007 ER_{52}	—	March 11, 2007	Mount Lemmon	Mount Lemmon Survey	·	900 m	MPC · JPL
335752	2007 ET_{55}	—	March 12, 2007	Mount Lemmon	Mount Lemmon Survey	PHO	1.2 km	MPC · JPL
335753	2007 EO_{73}	—	March 10, 2007	Mount Lemmon	Mount Lemmon Survey	·	1.1 km	MPC · JPL
335754	2007 EQ_{73}	—	March 10, 2007	Mount Lemmon	Mount Lemmon Survey	·	2.7 km	MPC · JPL
335755	2007 EO_{76}	—	March 10, 2007	Kitt Peak	Spacewatch	·	1.8 km	MPC · JPL
335756	2007 EY_{82}	—	March 12, 2007	Kitt Peak	Spacewatch	·	590 m	MPC · JPL
335757	2007 EW_{86}	—	March 13, 2007	Catalina	CSS	(5)	1.6 km	MPC · JPL
335758	2007 EM_{88}	—	March 15, 2007	Kitt Peak	Spacewatch	AMO	410 m	MPC · JPL
335759	2007 EO_{91}	—	March 10, 2007	Kitt Peak	Spacewatch	·	1.8 km	MPC · JPL
335760	2007 EU_{100}	—	March 11, 2007	Mount Lemmon	Mount Lemmon Survey	·	960 m	MPC · JPL
335761	2007 EJ_{104}	—	March 11, 2007	Mount Lemmon	Mount Lemmon Survey	·	1.4 km	MPC · JPL
335762	2007 EV_{113}	—	February 11, 2003	Haleakala	NEAT	·	1.9 km	MPC · JPL
335763	2007 ET_{116}	—	March 13, 2007	Mount Lemmon	Mount Lemmon Survey	·	1.3 km	MPC · JPL
335764	2007 ET_{117}	—	February 21, 2007	Mount Lemmon	Mount Lemmon Survey	·	2.0 km	MPC · JPL
335765	2007 EX_{119}	—	March 13, 2007	Mount Lemmon	Mount Lemmon Survey	·	1.3 km	MPC · JPL
335766	2007 EC_{141}	—	March 12, 2007	Kitt Peak	Spacewatch	L5	9.3 km	MPC · JPL
335767	2007 EV_{145}	—	March 12, 2007	Mount Lemmon	Mount Lemmon Survey	L5	8.9 km	MPC · JPL
335768	2007 EH_{150}	—	March 12, 2007	Mount Lemmon	Mount Lemmon Survey	·	1.1 km	MPC · JPL
335769	2007 ET_{151}	—	February 26, 2007	Mount Lemmon	Mount Lemmon Survey	·	1.0 km	MPC · JPL
335770	2007 EP_{156}	—	March 12, 2007	Kitt Peak	Spacewatch	·	1.9 km	MPC · JPL
335771	2007 EF_{161}	—	March 14, 2007	Siding Spring	SSS	·	3.1 km	MPC · JPL
335772	2007 EA_{166}	—	March 10, 2007	Kitt Peak	Spacewatch	·	690 m	MPC · JPL
335773	2007 ER_{178}	—	March 14, 2007	Kitt Peak	Spacewatch	·	1.7 km	MPC · JPL
335774	2007 EY_{178}	—	March 14, 2007	Kitt Peak	Spacewatch	·	2.2 km	MPC · JPL
335775	2007 EH_{180}	—	March 14, 2007	Kitt Peak	Spacewatch	EUN	1.5 km	MPC · JPL
335776	2007 EU_{180}	—	March 14, 2007	Catalina	CSS	·	2.4 km	MPC · JPL
335777	2007 EX_{193}	—	March 14, 2007	Catalina	CSS	·	2.5 km	MPC · JPL
335778	2007 EQ_{203}	—	March 10, 2007	Mount Lemmon	Mount Lemmon Survey	·	1.3 km	MPC · JPL
335779	2007 EW_{214}	—	March 9, 2007	Mount Lemmon	Mount Lemmon Survey	·	1.0 km	MPC · JPL
335780	2007 ED_{216}	—	March 13, 2007	Catalina	CSS	JUN	1.2 km	MPC · JPL
335781	2007 EN_{218}	—	March 10, 2007	Mount Lemmon	Mount Lemmon Survey	·	1.0 km	MPC · JPL
335782	2007 FR_{4}	—	March 19, 2007	La Sagra	OAM	·	840 m	MPC · JPL
335783	2007 FR_{10}	—	March 16, 2007	Kitt Peak	Spacewatch	·	1.8 km	MPC · JPL
335784	2007 FP_{15}	—	March 19, 2007	Anderson Mesa	LONEOS	·	1.5 km	MPC · JPL
335785	2007 FJ_{19}	—	March 20, 2007	Mount Lemmon	Mount Lemmon Survey	·	1.6 km	MPC · JPL
335786	2007 FM_{33}	—	March 25, 2007	Mount Lemmon	Mount Lemmon Survey	MAS	710 m	MPC · JPL
335787	2007 FQ_{47}	—	March 26, 2007	Kitt Peak	Spacewatch	·	2.0 km	MPC · JPL
335788	2007 GJ	—	April 7, 2007	Catalina	CSS	·	3.7 km	MPC · JPL
335789	2007 GN_{13}	—	April 11, 2007	Kitt Peak	Spacewatch	L5	7.9 km	MPC · JPL
335790	2007 GN_{37}	—	April 14, 2007	Kitt Peak	Spacewatch	(5)	1.9 km	MPC · JPL
335791	2007 GK_{46}	—	April 14, 2007	Kitt Peak	Spacewatch	MRX	1.3 km	MPC · JPL
335792	2007 GN_{51}	—	April 11, 2007	Catalina	CSS	·	2.1 km	MPC · JPL
335793	2007 GF_{59}	—	April 15, 2007	Kitt Peak	Spacewatch	·	1.6 km	MPC · JPL
335794	2007 GQ_{59}	—	April 15, 2007	Kitt Peak	Spacewatch	·	1.6 km	MPC · JPL
335795	2007 GT_{60}	—	April 15, 2007	Kitt Peak	Spacewatch	·	1.3 km	MPC · JPL
335796	2007 GN_{73}	—	April 15, 2007	Catalina	CSS	·	1.9 km	MPC · JPL
335797	2007 HJ_{1}	—	April 16, 2007	Catalina	CSS	·	1.9 km	MPC · JPL
335798	2007 HM_{15}	—	April 19, 2007	Pises	Pises	·	1.3 km	MPC · JPL
335799 Zonglü	2007 HW_{15}	Zonglü	April 19, 2007	Lulin	Q. Ye, Lin, H.-C.	·	2.4 km	MPC · JPL
335800	2007 HM_{24}	—	April 18, 2007	Kitt Peak	Spacewatch	·	2.0 km	MPC · JPL

== 335801–335900 ==
back to top

Designation			Discovery			Properties		Ref
Permanent	Provisional	Named after	Date	Site	Discoverer(s)	Category	Diam.	Ref
335801	2007 HK_{41}	—	April 20, 2007	Socorro	LINEAR	EUN	2.2 km	MPC · JPL
335802	2007 HF_{46}	—	April 20, 2007	Anderson Mesa	LONEOS	EUN	1.6 km	MPC · JPL
335803	2007 HK_{59}	—	April 18, 2007	Mount Lemmon	Mount Lemmon Survey	·	1.8 km	MPC · JPL
335804	2007 HW_{66}	—	April 22, 2007	Mount Lemmon	Mount Lemmon Survey	·	1.7 km	MPC · JPL
335805	2007 HA_{82}	—	April 25, 2007	Kitt Peak	Spacewatch	·	2.0 km	MPC · JPL
335806	2007 HA_{84}	—	April 26, 2007	Kitt Peak	Spacewatch	EUN	1.6 km	MPC · JPL
335807	2007 HE_{97}	—	April 23, 2007	Catalina	CSS	·	1.8 km	MPC · JPL
335808	2007 JG	—	May 7, 2007	Mount Lemmon	Mount Lemmon Survey	·	2.1 km	MPC · JPL
335809	2007 JG_{4}	—	May 7, 2007	Kitt Peak	Spacewatch	·	1.5 km	MPC · JPL
335810	2007 JR_{4}	—	May 7, 2007	Kitt Peak	Spacewatch	·	2.6 km	MPC · JPL
335811	2007 JE_{5}	—	May 9, 2007	Mount Lemmon	Mount Lemmon Survey	·	1.8 km	MPC · JPL
335812	2007 JR_{10}	—	May 7, 2007	Kitt Peak	Spacewatch	·	1.8 km	MPC · JPL
335813	2007 JZ_{11}	—	May 7, 2007	Kitt Peak	Spacewatch	·	2.4 km	MPC · JPL
335814	2007 JA_{12}	—	May 7, 2007	Kitt Peak	Spacewatch	·	2.0 km	MPC · JPL
335815	2007 JS_{17}	—	May 7, 2007	Mount Lemmon	Mount Lemmon Survey	·	2.2 km	MPC · JPL
335816	2007 JT_{17}	—	May 7, 2007	Mount Lemmon	Mount Lemmon Survey	·	2.9 km	MPC · JPL
335817	2007 JU_{17}	—	May 7, 2007	Mount Lemmon	Mount Lemmon Survey	·	2.7 km	MPC · JPL
335818	2007 JV_{17}	—	May 7, 2007	Mount Lemmon	Mount Lemmon Survey	EUN	1.4 km	MPC · JPL
335819	2007 JO_{18}	—	May 9, 2007	Kitt Peak	Spacewatch	·	1.3 km	MPC · JPL
335820	2007 JB_{20}	—	May 10, 2007	Mount Lemmon	Mount Lemmon Survey	·	1.5 km	MPC · JPL
335821	2007 JD_{32}	—	May 12, 2007	Mount Lemmon	Mount Lemmon Survey	·	2.1 km	MPC · JPL
335822	2007 JR_{40}	—	May 12, 2007	Mount Lemmon	Mount Lemmon Survey	MAR	1.2 km	MPC · JPL
335823	2007 JU_{42}	—	April 9, 2007	Siding Spring	SSS	·	2.5 km	MPC · JPL
335824	2007 KN_{7}	—	May 16, 2007	Siding Spring	SSS	JUN	1.6 km	MPC · JPL
335825	2007 LN_{3}	—	June 8, 2007	Kitt Peak	Spacewatch	ADE	3.3 km	MPC · JPL
335826	2007 LD_{4}	—	June 8, 2007	Kitt Peak	Spacewatch	·	1.8 km	MPC · JPL
335827	2007 LJ_{5}	—	June 9, 2007	Kitt Peak	Spacewatch	·	1.6 km	MPC · JPL
335828	2007 LS_{5}	—	June 7, 2007	Kitt Peak	Spacewatch	EUN	1.4 km	MPC · JPL
335829	2007 LD_{6}	—	June 8, 2007	Kitt Peak	Spacewatch	·	1.9 km	MPC · JPL
335830	2007 LY_{7}	—	June 8, 2007	Kitt Peak	Spacewatch	·	1.8 km	MPC · JPL
335831	2007 LH_{9}	—	June 8, 2007	Kitt Peak	Spacewatch	·	1.9 km	MPC · JPL
335832	2007 LJ_{9}	—	January 31, 2006	Kitt Peak	Spacewatch	·	1.7 km	MPC · JPL
335833	2007 LW_{16}	—	June 10, 2007	Kitt Peak	Spacewatch	·	1.8 km	MPC · JPL
335834	2007 LE_{20}	—	June 9, 2007	Kitt Peak	Spacewatch	·	2.1 km	MPC · JPL
335835	2007 LE_{24}	—	June 14, 2007	Kitt Peak	Spacewatch	ADE	1.8 km	MPC · JPL
335836	2007 LY_{26}	—	June 15, 2007	Kitt Peak	Spacewatch	·	2.5 km	MPC · JPL
335837	2007 LZ_{33}	—	June 15, 2007	Kitt Peak	Spacewatch	·	2.3 km	MPC · JPL
335838	2007 LP_{34}	—	June 9, 2007	Kitt Peak	Spacewatch	·	1.7 km	MPC · JPL
335839	2007 MQ_{1}	—	June 16, 2007	Kitt Peak	Spacewatch	·	2.3 km	MPC · JPL
335840	2007 MM_{2}	—	June 16, 2007	Kitt Peak	Spacewatch	·	2.5 km	MPC · JPL
335841	2007 MG_{4}	—	June 16, 2007	Kitt Peak	Spacewatch	(5)	1.6 km	MPC · JPL
335842	2007 MP_{5}	—	June 17, 2007	Kitt Peak	Spacewatch	·	1.9 km	MPC · JPL
335843	2007 MN_{6}	—	June 21, 2007	Tiki	S. F. Hönig, Teamo, N.	·	4.6 km	MPC · JPL
335844	2007 MX_{8}	—	June 19, 2007	Kitt Peak	Spacewatch	·	2.2 km	MPC · JPL
335845	2007 MP_{16}	—	June 23, 2007	Kitt Peak	Spacewatch	PHO	1.3 km	MPC · JPL
335846	2007 MW_{21}	—	June 22, 2007	Kitt Peak	Spacewatch	·	4.3 km	MPC · JPL
335847	2007 OJ_{10}	—	July 18, 2007	Mount Lemmon	Mount Lemmon Survey	·	2.4 km	MPC · JPL
335848	2007 PP_{24}	—	August 12, 2007	Socorro	LINEAR	EOS	2.6 km	MPC · JPL
335849	2007 PQ_{46}	—	August 10, 2007	Kitt Peak	Spacewatch	·	2.9 km	MPC · JPL
335850	2007 QO_{5}	—	August 17, 2007	Purple Mountain	PMO NEO Survey Program	·	2.8 km	MPC · JPL
335851	2007 QZ_{11}	—	August 22, 2007	Goodricke-Pigott	R. A. Tucker	·	5.0 km	MPC · JPL
335852	2007 QJ_{17}	—	August 24, 2007	Kitt Peak	Spacewatch	·	4.5 km	MPC · JPL
335853 Valléedaoste	2007 RT_{6}	Valléedaoste	September 7, 2007	Saint-Barthelemy	Carbognani, A.	HYG	3.0 km	MPC · JPL
335854	2007 RT_{8}	—	January 4, 2006	Catalina	CSS	H	600 m	MPC · JPL
335855	2007 RD_{16}	—	September 12, 2007	Altschwendt	W. Ries	·	3.3 km	MPC · JPL
335856	2007 RH_{16}	—	September 21, 2001	Kitt Peak	Spacewatch	·	3.5 km	MPC · JPL
335857	2007 RO_{18}	—	September 12, 2007	Dauban	Chante-Perdrix	·	2.4 km	MPC · JPL
335858	2007 RB_{23}	—	September 3, 2007	Catalina	CSS	·	2.5 km	MPC · JPL
335859	2007 RE_{43}	—	September 9, 2007	Kitt Peak	Spacewatch	·	3.4 km	MPC · JPL
335860	2007 RQ_{45}	—	September 9, 2007	Kitt Peak	Spacewatch	·	3.4 km	MPC · JPL
335861	2007 RV_{51}	—	September 9, 2007	Kitt Peak	Spacewatch	EOS	2.4 km	MPC · JPL
335862	2007 RK_{52}	—	September 9, 2007	Kitt Peak	Spacewatch	·	3.1 km	MPC · JPL
335863	2007 RR_{52}	—	September 9, 2007	Kitt Peak	Spacewatch	·	5.5 km	MPC · JPL
335864	2007 RG_{53}	—	September 9, 2007	Kitt Peak	Spacewatch	·	3.1 km	MPC · JPL
335865	2007 RM_{54}	—	September 9, 2007	Kitt Peak	Spacewatch	·	2.7 km	MPC · JPL
335866	2007 RX_{54}	—	September 9, 2007	Kitt Peak	Spacewatch	·	2.8 km	MPC · JPL
335867	2007 RL_{55}	—	September 9, 2007	Kitt Peak	Spacewatch	·	3.6 km	MPC · JPL
335868	2007 RP_{68}	—	September 10, 2007	Kitt Peak	Spacewatch	KOR	1.9 km	MPC · JPL
335869	2007 RZ_{97}	—	September 10, 2007	Kitt Peak	Spacewatch	·	2.6 km	MPC · JPL
335870	2007 RQ_{102}	—	September 11, 2007	Mount Lemmon	Mount Lemmon Survey	·	2.4 km	MPC · JPL
335871	2007 RG_{109}	—	September 11, 2007	Kitt Peak	Spacewatch	·	2.1 km	MPC · JPL
335872	2007 RY_{114}	—	September 11, 2007	Kitt Peak	Spacewatch	·	3.0 km	MPC · JPL
335873	2007 RG_{115}	—	September 11, 2007	Kitt Peak	Spacewatch	·	3.8 km	MPC · JPL
335874	2007 RW_{117}	—	September 11, 2007	Kitt Peak	Spacewatch	EOS	2.3 km	MPC · JPL
335875	2007 RL_{118}	—	September 11, 2007	Mount Lemmon	Mount Lemmon Survey	·	3.0 km	MPC · JPL
335876	2007 RP_{126}	—	September 12, 2007	Mount Lemmon	Mount Lemmon Survey	·	3.2 km	MPC · JPL
335877	2007 RC_{128}	—	September 12, 2007	Mount Lemmon	Mount Lemmon Survey	·	2.0 km	MPC · JPL
335878	2007 RB_{129}	—	September 12, 2007	Mount Lemmon	Mount Lemmon Survey	·	3.4 km	MPC · JPL
335879	2007 RX_{130}	—	September 12, 2007	Mount Lemmon	Mount Lemmon Survey	·	3.0 km	MPC · JPL
335880	2007 RL_{143}	—	September 14, 2007	Socorro	LINEAR	TIR	3.3 km	MPC · JPL
335881	2007 RF_{146}	—	September 15, 2007	Socorro	LINEAR	·	3.2 km	MPC · JPL
335882	2007 RC_{152}	—	September 10, 2007	Kitt Peak	Spacewatch	·	3.9 km	MPC · JPL
335883	2007 RW_{163}	—	June 23, 1995	Kitt Peak	Spacewatch	EOS	2.0 km	MPC · JPL
335884	2007 RO_{165}	—	September 10, 2007	Kitt Peak	Spacewatch	·	2.0 km	MPC · JPL
335885	2007 RE_{170}	—	September 10, 2007	Kitt Peak	Spacewatch	EOS	2.4 km	MPC · JPL
335886	2007 RA_{173}	—	September 10, 2007	Kitt Peak	Spacewatch	EOS	2.5 km	MPC · JPL
335887	2007 RD_{173}	—	September 10, 2007	Kitt Peak	Spacewatch	·	3.0 km	MPC · JPL
335888	2007 RO_{188}	—	September 10, 2007	Kitt Peak	Spacewatch	·	2.0 km	MPC · JPL
335889	2007 RF_{190}	—	September 11, 2007	Catalina	CSS	H	470 m	MPC · JPL
335890	2007 RQ_{190}	—	September 11, 2007	Kitt Peak	Spacewatch	·	3.0 km	MPC · JPL
335891	2007 RE_{192}	—	September 11, 2007	Purple Mountain	PMO NEO Survey Program	·	3.6 km	MPC · JPL
335892	2007 RH_{207}	—	September 10, 2007	Kitt Peak	Spacewatch	·	5.1 km	MPC · JPL
335893	2007 RT_{207}	—	September 10, 2007	Kitt Peak	Spacewatch	·	2.2 km	MPC · JPL
335894	2007 RU_{215}	—	September 12, 2007	Kitt Peak	Spacewatch	·	2.6 km	MPC · JPL
335895	2007 RB_{218}	—	September 13, 2007	Mount Lemmon	Mount Lemmon Survey	THM	2.8 km	MPC · JPL
335896	2007 RC_{219}	—	September 14, 2007	Mount Lemmon	Mount Lemmon Survey	·	2.3 km	MPC · JPL
335897	2007 RO_{226}	—	September 10, 2007	Kitt Peak	Spacewatch	EOS	2.6 km	MPC · JPL
335898	2007 RG_{227}	—	September 10, 2007	Kitt Peak	Spacewatch	·	2.6 km	MPC · JPL
335899	2007 RN_{231}	—	September 11, 2007	Mount Lemmon	Mount Lemmon Survey	THM	2.5 km	MPC · JPL
335900	2007 RR_{247}	—	September 13, 2007	Catalina	CSS	·	3.7 km	MPC · JPL

== 335901–336000 ==
back to top

Designation			Discovery			Properties		Ref
Permanent	Provisional	Named after	Date	Site	Discoverer(s)	Category	Diam.	Ref
335901	2007 RE_{268}	—	September 13, 2007	Anderson Mesa	LONEOS	·	2.1 km	MPC · JPL
335902	2007 RQ_{285}	—	September 14, 2007	Catalina	CSS	·	3.4 km	MPC · JPL
335903	2007 RM_{291}	—	September 12, 2007	Catalina	CSS	·	3.6 km	MPC · JPL
335904	2007 RF_{295}	—	September 14, 2007	Mount Lemmon	Mount Lemmon Survey	·	4.4 km	MPC · JPL
335905	2007 RS_{300}	—	September 12, 2007	Mount Lemmon	Mount Lemmon Survey	·	2.2 km	MPC · JPL
335906	2007 RV_{310}	—	September 13, 2007	Catalina	CSS	·	3.1 km	MPC · JPL
335907	2007 RD_{312}	—	September 11, 2007	Kitt Peak	Spacewatch	·	3.2 km	MPC · JPL
335908	2007 RS_{313}	—	September 12, 2007	Catalina	CSS	EOS	2.8 km	MPC · JPL
335909	2007 RH_{315}	—	September 9, 2007	Kitt Peak	Spacewatch	·	3.1 km	MPC · JPL
335910	2007 RS_{315}	—	September 12, 2007	Mount Lemmon	Mount Lemmon Survey	·	4.7 km	MPC · JPL
335911	2007 RC_{318}	—	September 11, 2007	Catalina	CSS	·	3.0 km	MPC · JPL
335912	2007 RP_{318}	—	September 11, 2007	Kitt Peak	Spacewatch	·	1.8 km	MPC · JPL
335913	2007 RK_{320}	—	September 13, 2007	Mount Lemmon	Mount Lemmon Survey	VER	3.4 km	MPC · JPL
335914	2007 RR_{321}	—	September 15, 2007	Mount Lemmon	Mount Lemmon Survey	VER	3.7 km	MPC · JPL
335915	2007 RU_{323}	—	September 11, 2007	Kitt Peak	Spacewatch	·	2.9 km	MPC · JPL
335916	2007 SM_{10}	—	September 19, 2007	Kitt Peak	Spacewatch	·	3.3 km	MPC · JPL
335917	2007 SV_{14}	—	September 21, 2007	Kitt Peak	Spacewatch	·	3.7 km	MPC · JPL
335918	2007 SG_{15}	—	September 25, 2007	Mount Lemmon	Mount Lemmon Survey	H	750 m	MPC · JPL
335919	2007 SQ_{16}	—	September 30, 2007	Kitt Peak	Spacewatch	·	2.5 km	MPC · JPL
335920	2007 SW_{18}	—	September 18, 2007	Catalina	CSS	EOS	2.7 km	MPC · JPL
335921	2007 SH_{21}	—	September 18, 2007	Catalina	CSS	·	4.6 km	MPC · JPL
335922	2007 SJ_{23}	—	September 25, 2007	Mount Lemmon	Mount Lemmon Survey	·	3.2 km	MPC · JPL
335923	2007 TF_{3}	—	October 5, 2007	Bisei SG Center	BATTeRS	EOS	2.3 km	MPC · JPL
335924	2007 TO_{11}	—	October 6, 2007	Socorro	LINEAR	·	2.0 km	MPC · JPL
335925	2007 TF_{13}	—	October 6, 2007	Socorro	LINEAR	·	2.7 km	MPC · JPL
335926	2007 TG_{13}	—	October 6, 2007	Socorro	LINEAR	·	2.5 km	MPC · JPL
335927	2007 TX_{16}	—	October 6, 2007	Dauban	Chante-Perdrix	·	5.1 km	MPC · JPL
335928	2007 TL_{17}	—	October 7, 2007	Dauban	Chante-Perdrix	·	2.2 km	MPC · JPL
335929	2007 TC_{20}	—	October 6, 2007	Socorro	LINEAR	·	2.8 km	MPC · JPL
335930	2007 TW_{20}	—	October 9, 2007	Altschwendt	W. Ries	THM	2.6 km	MPC · JPL
335931	2007 TW_{23}	—	October 9, 2007	Socorro	LINEAR	H	550 m	MPC · JPL
335932	2007 TG_{31}	—	October 4, 2007	Kitt Peak	Spacewatch	·	3.2 km	MPC · JPL
335933	2007 TV_{31}	—	October 5, 2007	Siding Spring	SSS	·	3.3 km	MPC · JPL
335934	2007 TE_{33}	—	October 6, 2007	Kitt Peak	Spacewatch	THM	2.2 km	MPC · JPL
335935	2007 TF_{37}	—	September 9, 2007	Mount Lemmon	Mount Lemmon Survey	EOS	2.2 km	MPC · JPL
335936	2007 TU_{50}	—	October 4, 2007	Kitt Peak	Spacewatch	·	2.2 km	MPC · JPL
335937	2007 TB_{52}	—	October 4, 2007	Kitt Peak	Spacewatch	·	5.2 km	MPC · JPL
335938	2007 TL_{54}	—	October 4, 2007	Kitt Peak	Spacewatch	·	2.6 km	MPC · JPL
335939	2007 TW_{54}	—	October 4, 2007	Kitt Peak	Spacewatch	·	4.0 km	MPC · JPL
335940	2007 TR_{60}	—	October 6, 2007	Kitt Peak	Spacewatch	·	4.1 km	MPC · JPL
335941	2007 TO_{61}	—	October 7, 2007	Mount Lemmon	Mount Lemmon Survey	THM	3.1 km	MPC · JPL
335942	2007 TC_{62}	—	October 7, 2007	Mount Lemmon	Mount Lemmon Survey	EOS	2.2 km	MPC · JPL
335943	2007 TO_{66}	—	October 10, 2007	Dauban	Chante-Perdrix	EOS	2.0 km	MPC · JPL
335944	2007 TJ_{67}	—	October 7, 2007	Catalina	CSS	EOS ·	4.0 km	MPC · JPL
335945	2007 TQ_{67}	—	October 8, 2007	Catalina	CSS	EOS	2.7 km	MPC · JPL
335946	2007 TF_{71}	—	October 14, 2007	Catalina	CSS	H	620 m	MPC · JPL
335947	2007 TY_{77}	—	October 5, 2007	Kitt Peak	Spacewatch	·	3.4 km	MPC · JPL
335948	2007 TT_{88}	—	October 8, 2007	Catalina	CSS	·	6.8 km	MPC · JPL
335949	2007 TF_{91}	—	October 8, 2007	Mount Lemmon	Mount Lemmon Survey	·	2.9 km	MPC · JPL
335950	2007 TR_{91}	—	October 4, 2007	Kitt Peak	Spacewatch	·	3.1 km	MPC · JPL
335951	2007 TB_{93}	—	October 6, 2007	Kitt Peak	Spacewatch	·	2.2 km	MPC · JPL
335952	2007 TD_{94}	—	October 7, 2007	Catalina	CSS	T_{j} (2.99)	3.8 km	MPC · JPL
335953	2007 TG_{94}	—	October 7, 2007	Catalina	CSS	HYG	3.0 km	MPC · JPL
335954	2007 TB_{107}	—	October 4, 2007	Kitt Peak	Spacewatch	·	3.6 km	MPC · JPL
335955	2007 TS_{108}	—	October 7, 2007	Catalina	CSS	EOS	2.8 km	MPC · JPL
335956	2007 TP_{120}	—	October 4, 2007	Kitt Peak	Spacewatch	·	2.5 km	MPC · JPL
335957	2007 TL_{121}	—	October 6, 2007	Kitt Peak	Spacewatch	THM	2.4 km	MPC · JPL
335958	2007 TP_{139}	—	October 9, 2007	Kitt Peak	Spacewatch	VER	4.5 km	MPC · JPL
335959	2007 TZ_{145}	—	October 6, 2007	Socorro	LINEAR	·	3.0 km	MPC · JPL
335960	2007 TW_{150}	—	October 9, 2007	Socorro	LINEAR	EMA	5.2 km	MPC · JPL
335961	2007 TB_{152}	—	October 9, 2007	Socorro	LINEAR	·	2.4 km	MPC · JPL
335962	2007 TE_{152}	—	October 9, 2007	Socorro	LINEAR	·	3.0 km	MPC · JPL
335963	2007 TC_{154}	—	October 9, 2007	Socorro	LINEAR	·	3.5 km	MPC · JPL
335964	2007 TM_{157}	—	October 9, 2007	Socorro	LINEAR	·	2.4 km	MPC · JPL
335965	2007 TF_{162}	—	October 11, 2007	Socorro	LINEAR	·	2.3 km	MPC · JPL
335966	2007 TO_{168}	—	October 12, 2007	Socorro	LINEAR	·	3.3 km	MPC · JPL
335967	2007 TA_{169}	—	October 12, 2007	Socorro	LINEAR	·	4.8 km	MPC · JPL
335968 Xiejin	2007 TW_{171}	Xiejin	September 21, 2007	XuYi	PMO NEO Survey Program	TIR	4.5 km	MPC · JPL
335969	2007 TM_{174}	—	October 4, 2007	Catalina	CSS	·	3.0 km	MPC · JPL
335970	2007 TW_{183}	—	October 9, 2007	Purple Mountain	PMO NEO Survey Program	·	3.1 km	MPC · JPL
335971	2007 TP_{196}	—	October 7, 2007	Mount Lemmon	Mount Lemmon Survey	·	3.1 km	MPC · JPL
335972	2007 TK_{197}	—	August 24, 2007	Kitt Peak	Spacewatch	VER	3.0 km	MPC · JPL
335973	2007 TY_{207}	—	October 10, 2007	Catalina	CSS	·	5.1 km	MPC · JPL
335974	2007 TE_{217}	—	October 7, 2007	Kitt Peak	Spacewatch	·	3.1 km	MPC · JPL
335975	2007 TV_{222}	—	October 10, 2007	Kitt Peak	Spacewatch	·	3.3 km	MPC · JPL
335976	2007 TJ_{224}	—	September 21, 2003	Kitt Peak	Spacewatch	GEF	1.7 km	MPC · JPL
335977	2007 TB_{225}	—	October 11, 2007	Catalina	CSS	·	2.3 km	MPC · JPL
335978	2007 TG_{226}	—	October 8, 2007	Catalina	CSS	·	4.0 km	MPC · JPL
335979	2007 TM_{226}	—	October 8, 2007	Kitt Peak	Spacewatch	·	2.6 km	MPC · JPL
335980	2007 TV_{237}	—	October 10, 2007	Kitt Peak	Spacewatch	·	3.2 km	MPC · JPL
335981	2007 TZ_{239}	—	October 14, 2007	Socorro	LINEAR	·	3.1 km	MPC · JPL
335982	2007 TD_{240}	—	October 14, 2007	Socorro	LINEAR	·	3.7 km	MPC · JPL
335983	2007 TH_{240}	—	October 14, 2007	Socorro	LINEAR	·	3.4 km	MPC · JPL
335984	2007 TK_{247}	—	October 10, 2007	Anderson Mesa	LONEOS	·	3.9 km	MPC · JPL
335985	2007 TD_{248}	—	October 10, 2007	Anderson Mesa	LONEOS	EOS	2.9 km	MPC · JPL
335986	2007 TF_{255}	—	October 10, 2007	Kitt Peak	Spacewatch	·	4.0 km	MPC · JPL
335987	2007 TV_{266}	—	October 9, 2007	Kitt Peak	Spacewatch	·	2.0 km	MPC · JPL
335988	2007 TK_{273}	—	October 10, 2007	Mount Lemmon	Mount Lemmon Survey	·	3.4 km	MPC · JPL
335989	2007 TW_{275}	—	October 11, 2007	Mount Lemmon	Mount Lemmon Survey	EOS	2.4 km	MPC · JPL
335990	2007 TE_{302}	—	October 12, 2007	Kitt Peak	Spacewatch	·	2.5 km	MPC · JPL
335991	2007 TR_{307}	—	October 9, 2007	Mount Lemmon	Mount Lemmon Survey	·	1.8 km	MPC · JPL
335992	2007 TG_{320}	—	October 13, 2007	Catalina	CSS	·	2.7 km	MPC · JPL
335993	2007 TY_{329}	—	October 11, 2007	Kitt Peak	Spacewatch	HYG	3.2 km	MPC · JPL
335994	2007 TA_{354}	—	October 10, 2007	Catalina	CSS	·	3.0 km	MPC · JPL
335995	2007 TJ_{354}	—	April 24, 1995	Kitt Peak	Spacewatch	·	3.2 km	MPC · JPL
335996	2007 TR_{354}	—	October 10, 2007	Kitt Peak	Spacewatch	EOS	2.7 km	MPC · JPL
335997	2007 TL_{355}	—	October 11, 2007	Catalina	CSS	·	3.6 km	MPC · JPL
335998	2007 TV_{355}	—	October 11, 2007	Catalina	CSS	·	3.1 km	MPC · JPL
335999	2007 TY_{355}	—	October 11, 2007	Catalina	CSS	·	3.4 km	MPC · JPL
336000	2007 TC_{357}	—	October 12, 2007	Kitt Peak	Spacewatch	EOS	2.2 km	MPC · JPL

back to top

== See also ==
- Meanings of minor-planet names: 335001–336000
