= Meanings of minor-planet names: 336001–337000 =

As minor planet discoveries are confirmed, they are given a permanent number by the IAU's Minor Planet Center (MPC), and the discoverers can then submit names for them, following the IAU's naming conventions. The list below concerns those minor planets in the specified number-range that have received names, and explains the meanings of those names.

Official naming citations of newly named small Solar System bodies are approved and published in a bulletin by IAU's Working Group for Small Bodies Nomenclature (WGSBN). Before May 2021, citations were published in MPC's Minor Planet Circulars for many decades. Recent citations can also be found on the JPL Small-Body Database (SBDB). Until his death in 2016, German astronomer Lutz D. Schmadel compiled these citations into the Dictionary of Minor Planet Names (DMP) and regularly updated the collection.

Based on Paul Herget's The Names of the Minor Planets, Schmadel also researched the unclear origin of numerous asteroids, most of which had been named prior to World War II. This article incorporates text from this source, which is in the public domain: SBDB New namings may only be added to this list below after official publication as the preannouncement of names is condemned. The WGSBN publishes a comprehensive guideline for the naming rules of non-cometary small Solar System bodies.

== 336001–336100 ==
| Named minor planet | Provisional | This minor planet was named for... | Ref · Catalog |
|---|---|---|---|
There are no named minor planets in this number range

== 336101–336200 ==
back to top

| Named minor planet | Provisional | This minor planet was named for... | Ref · Catalog |
|---|---|---|---|
| 336108 Luberon | 2008 JD_{8} | Luberon, a region in the middle of Provence in the far south of France. | JPL · 336108 |
| 336109 Rokiškis | 2008 JN_{8} | Rokiškis, a city in northeastern Lithuania known for its cheese. | JPL · 336109 |
| 336177 Churri | 2008 RD_{80} | Carmen "Churri" Lacruz (born 1959), sister of Spanish discoverer Juan Lacruz | JPL · 336177 |

== 336201–336300 ==
back to top

| Named minor planet | Provisional | This minor planet was named for... | Ref · Catalog |
|---|---|---|---|
| 336203 Sandrobuss | 2008 SE_{11} | Sandro Buss (born 1970) is a physicist from Geneva. During the 2016–2017 school year he trained as a teacher in Bienne to work at high school level. In the course of his training, he met the discoverer at the Lycée cantonal in Porrentruy (Jura). | JPL · 336203 |
| 336204 Sardinas | 2008 SM_{11} | Charo, Miguel Angel, Elvira and Irene, "Los Sardina", have supported and encouraged operations at the La Cañada Observatory in Spain | JPL · 336204 |

== 336301–336400 ==
back to top

| Named minor planet | Provisional | This minor planet was named for... | Ref · Catalog |
|---|---|---|---|
| 336392 Changhua | 2008 UU_{94} | Changhua County, a county situated in the mid-western part of Taiwan Island. | JPL · 336392 |

== 336401–336500 ==
back to top

| Named minor planet | Provisional | This minor planet was named for... | Ref · Catalog |
|---|---|---|---|
| 336465 Deluna | 2008 VR_{3} | Luna Ruiz (born 2000) is the daughter of Spanish astronomer Jose Maria Ruiz, who co-discovered this minor planet | JPL · 336465 |

== 336501–336600 ==
back to top

| Named minor planet | Provisional | This minor planet was named for... | Ref · Catalog |
|---|---|---|---|
There are no named minor planets in this number range

== 336601–336700 ==
back to top

| Named minor planet | Provisional | This minor planet was named for... | Ref · Catalog |
|---|---|---|---|
| 336680 Pavolpaulík | 2010 AQ_{39} | Pavol Paulík (1960–2013), a Slovak amateur astronomer and popularizer of astronomy | JPL · 336680 |
| 336694 Fey | 2010 AH_{89} | Elizabeth Stamatina (Tina) Fey (born 1970), an American actor, writer, producer, and comedian. | JPL · 336694 |
| 336698 Melbourne | 2010 CJ | Melbourne, capital city of the Australian state of Victoria | JPL · 336698 |

== 336701–336800 ==
back to top

| Named minor planet | Provisional | This minor planet was named for... | Ref · Catalog |
|---|---|---|---|
There are no named minor planets in this number range

== 336801–336900 ==
back to top

| Named minor planet | Provisional | This minor planet was named for... | Ref · Catalog |
|---|---|---|---|
| 336811 Baratoux | 2011 DL_{21} | David Baratoux (born 1973) is a French planetary scientist at IRD who has contributed to the understanding of the evolution of Mars. He promotes astronomy in developing countries and contributes regularly to public outreach in Earth and space sciences. | IAU · 336811 |
| 336877 Qifaren | 2011 GT_{41} | Qi Faren, academician of the Chinese Academy of Engineering. | IAU · 336877 |

== 336901–337000 ==
back to top

| Named minor planet | Provisional | This minor planet was named for... | Ref · Catalog |
|---|---|---|---|
There are no named minor planets in this number range

back to top

| Preceded by 335,001–336,000 | Meanings of minor-planet names List of minor planets: 336,001–337,000 | Succeeded by 337,001–338,000 |
