= List of minor planets: 337001–338000 =

The following is a partial list of minor planets, running from minor-planet number 337001 through 338000, inclusive. The primary data for this and other partial lists is based on JPL's "Small-Body Orbital Elements" and data available from the Minor Planet Center. Critical list information is also provided by the MPC, unless otherwise specified from Lowell Observatory. A detailed description of the table's columns and additional sources are given on the main page including a complete list of every page in this series, and a statistical break-up on the dynamical classification of minor planets.

Also see the summary list of all named bodies in numerical and alphabetical order, and the corresponding naming citations for the number range of this particular list. New namings may only be added to this list after official publication, as the preannouncement of names is condemned by the Working Group for Small Bodies Nomenclature of the International Astronomical Union.

Near-Earth obj.	MBA (inner)	MBA (outer)	Centaur
Mars-crosser	MBA (middle)	Jupiter trojan	Trans-Neptunian obj.
Unclassified

== 337001–337100 ==
Designation			Discovery			Properties		Ref
Permanent	Provisional	Named after	Date	Site	Discoverer(s)	Category	Diam.	Ref
337001	2012 MQ_{10}	—	January 13, 2005	Kitt Peak	Spacewatch	·	3.6 km	MPC · JPL
337002 Robertbodzon	2012 OB	Robertbodzon	October 25, 2005	Kitt Peak	Spacewatch	·	1.7 km	MPC · JPL
337003	2012 OG	—	October 15, 2004	Mount Lemmon	Mount Lemmon Survey	·	1.6 km	MPC · JPL
337004	6507 P-L	—	September 24, 1960	Palomar	C. J. van Houten, I. van Houten-Groeneveld, T. Gehrels	·	2.2 km	MPC · JPL
337005	2096 T-2	—	September 29, 1973	Palomar	C. J. van Houten, I. van Houten-Groeneveld, T. Gehrels	·	920 m	MPC · JPL
337006	1062 T-3	—	October 17, 1977	Palomar	C. J. van Houten, I. van Houten-Groeneveld, T. Gehrels	V	1.1 km	MPC · JPL
337007	2145 T-3	—	October 16, 1977	Palomar	C. J. van Houten, I. van Houten-Groeneveld, T. Gehrels	·	840 m	MPC · JPL
337008	2348 T-3	—	October 16, 1977	Palomar	C. J. van Houten, I. van Houten-Groeneveld, T. Gehrels	(2076)	950 m	MPC · JPL
337009	1993 PR_{2}	—	August 15, 1993	Kitt Peak	Spacewatch	·	2.9 km	MPC · JPL
337010	1993 TE_{17}	—	October 9, 1993	La Silla	E. W. Elst	·	1.7 km	MPC · JPL
337011	1993 VW_{5}	—	November 8, 1993	Kitt Peak	Spacewatch	H	650 m	MPC · JPL
337012	1994 NF	—	July 3, 1994	Kitt Peak	Spacewatch	·	1.5 km	MPC · JPL
337013	1994 PY_{5}	—	August 10, 1994	La Silla	E. W. Elst	·	2.5 km	MPC · JPL
337014	1994 SP_{2}	—	September 28, 1994	Kitt Peak	Spacewatch	MRX	770 m	MPC · JPL
337015	1994 TS_{10}	—	October 9, 1994	Kitt Peak	Spacewatch	·	2.1 km	MPC · JPL
337016	1994 TE_{11}	—	October 9, 1994	Kitt Peak	Spacewatch	NYS	960 m	MPC · JPL
337017	1995 DT_{5}	—	February 22, 1995	Kitt Peak	Spacewatch	GEF	1.6 km	MPC · JPL
337018	1995 FU_{1}	—	March 23, 1995	Kitt Peak	Spacewatch	L5	9.3 km	MPC · JPL
337019	1995 FW_{8}	—	March 26, 1995	Kitt Peak	Spacewatch	L5	10 km	MPC · JPL
337020	1995 OR_{2}	—	July 22, 1995	Kitt Peak	Spacewatch	·	3.4 km	MPC · JPL
337021	1995 OH_{13}	—	July 22, 1995	Kitt Peak	Spacewatch	·	1.1 km	MPC · JPL
337022	1995 QE_{4}	—	August 17, 1995	Kitt Peak	Spacewatch	·	530 m	MPC · JPL
337023	1995 SW_{10}	—	September 17, 1995	Kitt Peak	Spacewatch	·	4.3 km	MPC · JPL
337024	1995 SN_{12}	—	September 18, 1995	Kitt Peak	Spacewatch	·	1.2 km	MPC · JPL
337025	1995 SY_{24}	—	September 19, 1995	Kitt Peak	Spacewatch	THM	2.2 km	MPC · JPL
337026	1995 SQ_{26}	—	September 19, 1995	Kitt Peak	Spacewatch	·	1.7 km	MPC · JPL
337027	1995 SO_{31}	—	September 21, 1995	Kitt Peak	Spacewatch	·	3.4 km	MPC · JPL
337028	1995 SY_{33}	—	September 22, 1995	Kitt Peak	Spacewatch	VER	2.7 km	MPC · JPL
337029	1995 SV_{35}	—	September 23, 1995	Kitt Peak	Spacewatch	(5)	1.6 km	MPC · JPL
337030	1995 SB_{39}	—	September 24, 1995	Kitt Peak	Spacewatch	·	3.0 km	MPC · JPL
337031	1995 SD_{39}	—	September 24, 1995	Kitt Peak	Spacewatch	·	1.2 km	MPC · JPL
337032	1995 SB_{48}	—	September 26, 1995	Kitt Peak	Spacewatch	·	1.6 km	MPC · JPL
337033	1995 SH_{69}	—	September 18, 1995	Kitt Peak	Spacewatch	THM	2.1 km	MPC · JPL
337034	1995 SH_{76}	—	September 20, 1995	Kitt Peak	Spacewatch	·	2.6 km	MPC · JPL
337035	1995 UB_{11}	—	October 17, 1995	Kitt Peak	Spacewatch	·	3.2 km	MPC · JPL
337036	1995 UV_{26}	—	October 20, 1995	Kitt Peak	Spacewatch	THM	2.8 km	MPC · JPL
337037	1995 UW_{30}	—	October 20, 1995	Kitt Peak	Spacewatch	·	600 m	MPC · JPL
337038	1995 UN_{65}	—	October 27, 1995	Kitt Peak	Spacewatch	·	3.0 km	MPC · JPL
337039	1995 UV_{80}	—	October 25, 1995	Kitt Peak	Spacewatch	·	1.4 km	MPC · JPL
337040	1995 WD_{28}	—	November 19, 1995	Kitt Peak	Spacewatch	·	1.5 km	MPC · JPL
337041	1995 XF_{3}	—	December 14, 1995	Kitt Peak	Spacewatch	·	860 m	MPC · JPL
337042	1995 XG_{4}	—	December 14, 1995	Kitt Peak	Spacewatch	·	3.2 km	MPC · JPL
337043	1996 AZ_{13}	—	January 15, 1996	Kitt Peak	Spacewatch	·	1.3 km	MPC · JPL
337044 Bobdylan	1996 DB_{5}	Bobdylan	February 16, 1996	Caussols	E. W. Elst	NYS	1.3 km	MPC · JPL
337045	1996 RR_{18}	—	September 15, 1996	Kitt Peak	Spacewatch	·	1.8 km	MPC · JPL
337046	1996 TM_{12}	—	October 15, 1996	Oohira	T. Urata	·	1.6 km	MPC · JPL
337047	1996 TM_{29}	—	October 7, 1996	Kitt Peak	Spacewatch	THM	2.2 km	MPC · JPL
337048	1996 TN_{30}	—	October 7, 1996	Kitt Peak	Spacewatch	·	530 m	MPC · JPL
337049	1996 VX_{2}	—	November 11, 1996	Prescott	P. G. Comba	·	2.3 km	MPC · JPL
337050	1996 VD_{16}	—	November 5, 1996	Kitt Peak	Spacewatch	·	1.6 km	MPC · JPL
337051	1996 VF_{25}	—	November 10, 1996	Kitt Peak	Spacewatch	·	2.8 km	MPC · JPL
337052	1996 VL_{29}	—	November 13, 1996	Kitt Peak	Spacewatch	·	1.4 km	MPC · JPL
337053	1996 XW_{1}	—	December 2, 1996	Kitt Peak	Spacewatch	APO	550 m	MPC · JPL
337054	1996 XH_{23}	—	December 12, 1996	Kitt Peak	Spacewatch	·	1.6 km	MPC · JPL
337055	1997 BT_{6}	—	January 31, 1997	Kuma Kogen	A. Nakamura	·	880 m	MPC · JPL
337056	1997 EA_{10}	—	March 3, 1997	Kitt Peak	Spacewatch	·	2.2 km	MPC · JPL
337057	1997 EW_{11}	—	March 2, 1997	Kitt Peak	Spacewatch	·	1.1 km	MPC · JPL
337058	1997 GL_{10}	—	April 3, 1997	Socorro	LINEAR	·	1.7 km	MPC · JPL
337059	1997 LZ_{1}	—	June 2, 1997	Kitt Peak	Spacewatch	·	2.0 km	MPC · JPL
337060	1997 MY_{7}	—	June 29, 1997	Kitt Peak	Spacewatch	·	1.6 km	MPC · JPL
337061	1997 RC_{9}	—	September 10, 1997	Bergisch Gladbach	W. Bickel	·	1.9 km	MPC · JPL
337062	1997 SZ_{16}	—	September 30, 1997	Kitt Peak	Spacewatch	·	1.2 km	MPC · JPL
337063	1997 TQ_{3}	—	October 3, 1997	Caussols	ODAS	NYS	1.3 km	MPC · JPL
337064	1997 WS_{14}	—	November 23, 1997	Kitt Peak	Spacewatch	·	1.4 km	MPC · JPL
337065	1998 AW_{1}	—	January 1, 1998	Kitt Peak	Spacewatch	SUL	2.0 km	MPC · JPL
337066	1998 BM_{10}	—	January 25, 1998	Haleakala	NEAT	·	2.5 km	MPC · JPL
337067	1998 BU_{19}	—	January 22, 1998	Kitt Peak	Spacewatch	3:2 · SHU	5.6 km	MPC · JPL
337068	1998 FO_{88}	—	March 24, 1998	Socorro	LINEAR	·	3.6 km	MPC · JPL
337069	1998 FX_{134}	—	March 20, 1998	Socorro	LINEAR	AMO	660 m	MPC · JPL
337070	1998 HJ	—	April 17, 1998	Kitt Peak	Spacewatch	·	670 m	MPC · JPL
337071	1998 HY	—	April 17, 1998	Kitt Peak	Spacewatch	MAR	1.3 km	MPC · JPL
337072	1998 HA_{8}	—	April 21, 1998	Socorro	LINEAR	H	760 m	MPC · JPL
337073	1998 HF_{43}	—	April 30, 1998	Kitt Peak	Spacewatch	·	1.9 km	MPC · JPL
337074	1998 HU_{108}	—	April 23, 1998	Socorro	LINEAR	·	1.9 km	MPC · JPL
337075	1998 QC_{1}	—	August 17, 1998	Socorro	LINEAR	APO · PHA	390 m	MPC · JPL
337076	1998 QS_{58}	—	August 30, 1998	Kitt Peak	Spacewatch	MRX	1.4 km	MPC · JPL
337077	1998 RH_{8}	—	September 12, 1998	Kitt Peak	Spacewatch	·	980 m	MPC · JPL
337078	1998 RZ_{13}	—	September 14, 1998	Kitt Peak	Spacewatch	·	670 m	MPC · JPL
337079	1998 RQ_{21}	—	September 15, 1998	Kitt Peak	Spacewatch	WIT	1.1 km	MPC · JPL
337080	1998 RH_{45}	—	September 14, 1998	Socorro	LINEAR	·	800 m	MPC · JPL
337081	1998 RG_{62}	—	September 14, 1998	Socorro	LINEAR	·	850 m	MPC · JPL
337082	1998 RG_{74}	—	September 14, 1998	Socorro	LINEAR	·	1.2 km	MPC · JPL
337083	1998 RH_{81}	—	September 15, 1998	Kitt Peak	Spacewatch	·	760 m	MPC · JPL
337084	1998 SE_{36}	—	September 26, 1998	Socorro	LINEAR	AMO	400 m	MPC · JPL
337085	1998 SA_{47}	—	September 25, 1998	Kitt Peak	Spacewatch	·	930 m	MPC · JPL
337086	1998 SZ_{170}	—	September 25, 1998	Anderson Mesa	LONEOS	·	1.1 km	MPC · JPL
337087	1998 SG_{171}	—	September 16, 1998	Anderson Mesa	LONEOS	·	710 m	MPC · JPL
337088	1998 TU_{9}	—	October 12, 1998	Kitt Peak	Spacewatch	·	1.3 km	MPC · JPL
337089	1998 TW_{9}	—	October 12, 1998	Kitt Peak	Spacewatch	·	2.0 km	MPC · JPL
337090	1998 TJ_{19}	—	October 15, 1998	Xinglong	SCAP	PHO	780 m	MPC · JPL
337091	1998 US_{1}	—	October 18, 1998	Kitt Peak	Spacewatch	·	1.0 km	MPC · JPL
337092	1998 UV_{9}	—	October 16, 1998	Kitt Peak	Spacewatch	HOF	3.2 km	MPC · JPL
337093	1998 UU_{16}	—	October 27, 1998	Catalina	CSS	·	2.2 km	MPC · JPL
337094	1998 VL_{34}	—	November 10, 1998	Caussols	ODAS	V	660 m	MPC · JPL
337095	1998 VS_{46}	—	November 14, 1998	Kitt Peak	Spacewatch	·	660 m	MPC · JPL
337096	1998 WE_{6}	—	November 21, 1998	Socorro	LINEAR	·	1.4 km	MPC · JPL
337097	1998 XS_{6}	—	December 8, 1998	Kitt Peak	Spacewatch	GEF	1.7 km	MPC · JPL
337098	1998 XB_{10}	—	December 7, 1998	Caussols	ODAS	·	1.1 km	MPC · JPL
337099	1999 DH	—	February 16, 1999	Caussols	ODAS	·	1.3 km	MPC · JPL
337100	1999 FJ_{20}	—	March 19, 1999	Kitt Peak	Spacewatch	·	2.7 km	MPC · JPL

== 337101–337200 ==
back to top

Designation			Discovery			Properties		Ref
Permanent	Provisional	Named after	Date	Site	Discoverer(s)	Category	Diam.	Ref
337101	1999 FZ_{64}	—	March 20, 1999	Apache Point	SDSS	·	4.4 km	MPC · JPL
337102	1999 FL_{66}	—	August 16, 2001	Palomar	NEAT	EUP	3.4 km	MPC · JPL
337103	1999 JA_{5}	—	May 10, 1999	Socorro	LINEAR	·	1.6 km	MPC · JPL
337104	1999 NN_{22}	—	July 14, 1999	Socorro	LINEAR	·	2.2 km	MPC · JPL
337105	1999 RR_{15}	—	September 7, 1999	Socorro	LINEAR	·	2.5 km	MPC · JPL
337106	1999 RF_{51}	—	September 7, 1999	Socorro	LINEAR	·	2.9 km	MPC · JPL
337107	1999 RD_{61}	—	September 7, 1999	Socorro	LINEAR	·	1.6 km	MPC · JPL
337108	1999 RV_{84}	—	September 7, 1999	Socorro	LINEAR	(1547)	2.2 km	MPC · JPL
337109	1999 RY_{93}	—	September 7, 1999	Socorro	LINEAR	·	1.7 km	MPC · JPL
337110	1999 RE_{110}	—	September 8, 1999	Socorro	LINEAR	·	790 m	MPC · JPL
337111	1999 RP_{177}	—	September 9, 1999	Socorro	LINEAR	·	1.6 km	MPC · JPL
337112	1999 RP_{191}	—	September 11, 1999	Socorro	LINEAR	·	2.3 km	MPC · JPL
337113	1999 RU_{192}	—	September 15, 1999	Kitt Peak	Spacewatch	·	1.4 km	MPC · JPL
337114	1999 RZ_{204}	—	September 8, 1999	Socorro	LINEAR	(1547)	2.0 km	MPC · JPL
337115	1999 SN_{8}	—	September 29, 1999	Socorro	LINEAR	·	3.9 km	MPC · JPL
337116	1999 SP_{10}	—	September 30, 1999	Socorro	LINEAR	(194)	3.2 km	MPC · JPL
337117	1999 SF_{21}	—	September 30, 1999	Kitt Peak	Spacewatch	·	1.5 km	MPC · JPL
337118	1999 TX_{2}	—	October 2, 1999	Catalina	CSS	APO	760 m	MPC · JPL
337119	1999 TK_{12}	—	October 10, 1999	Socorro	LINEAR	AMO	520 m	MPC · JPL
337120	1999 TY_{14}	—	October 12, 1999	Fountain Hills	C. W. Juels	·	2.2 km	MPC · JPL
337121	1999 TV_{34}	—	October 3, 1999	Socorro	LINEAR	(1547)	2.8 km	MPC · JPL
337122	1999 TX_{38}	—	October 2, 1999	Catalina	CSS	·	1.9 km	MPC · JPL
337123	1999 TU_{39}	—	October 3, 1999	Catalina	CSS	·	2.3 km	MPC · JPL
337124	1999 TB_{49}	—	October 4, 1999	Kitt Peak	Spacewatch	EUN	1.6 km	MPC · JPL
337125	1999 TM_{56}	—	October 6, 1999	Kitt Peak	Spacewatch	·	2.2 km	MPC · JPL
337126	1999 TQ_{61}	—	October 7, 1999	Kitt Peak	Spacewatch	·	2.3 km	MPC · JPL
337127	1999 TL_{70}	—	October 9, 1999	Kitt Peak	Spacewatch	·	2.0 km	MPC · JPL
337128	1999 TA_{72}	—	October 9, 1999	Kitt Peak	Spacewatch	·	1.8 km	MPC · JPL
337129	1999 TY_{72}	—	October 10, 1999	Kitt Peak	Spacewatch	(5)	1.8 km	MPC · JPL
337130	1999 TO_{112}	—	October 4, 1999	Socorro	LINEAR	·	2.3 km	MPC · JPL
337131	1999 TC_{121}	—	October 4, 1999	Socorro	LINEAR	·	2.7 km	MPC · JPL
337132	1999 TO_{131}	—	October 6, 1999	Socorro	LINEAR	·	1.9 km	MPC · JPL
337133	1999 TN_{142}	—	October 7, 1999	Socorro	LINEAR	·	2.7 km	MPC · JPL
337134	1999 TF_{143}	—	October 7, 1999	Socorro	LINEAR	·	2.3 km	MPC · JPL
337135	1999 TP_{164}	—	October 10, 1999	Socorro	LINEAR	·	2.3 km	MPC · JPL
337136	1999 TO_{185}	—	October 12, 1999	Socorro	LINEAR	(1547) ·	2.4 km	MPC · JPL
337137	1999 TX_{187}	—	October 12, 1999	Socorro	LINEAR	·	2.7 km	MPC · JPL
337138	1999 TH_{204}	—	October 13, 1999	Socorro	LINEAR	·	1.6 km	MPC · JPL
337139	1999 TN_{211}	—	October 15, 1999	Socorro	LINEAR	H	850 m	MPC · JPL
337140	1999 TD_{214}	—	October 15, 1999	Socorro	LINEAR	·	1.7 km	MPC · JPL
337141	1999 TM_{222}	—	October 2, 1999	Catalina	CSS	ADE	2.6 km	MPC · JPL
337142	1999 TG_{226}	—	October 3, 1999	Kitt Peak	Spacewatch	ADE	2.3 km	MPC · JPL
337143	1999 TR_{228}	—	October 2, 1999	Anderson Mesa	LONEOS	·	1.9 km	MPC · JPL
337144	1999 TQ_{231}	—	October 5, 1999	Catalina	CSS	·	750 m	MPC · JPL
337145	1999 TQ_{256}	—	October 9, 1999	Socorro	LINEAR	·	1.7 km	MPC · JPL
337146	1999 TH_{265}	—	October 3, 1999	Socorro	LINEAR	·	2.1 km	MPC · JPL
337147	1999 TX_{265}	—	October 3, 1999	Socorro	LINEAR	EUN	1.5 km	MPC · JPL
337148	1999 TG_{271}	—	October 3, 1999	Socorro	LINEAR	·	1.8 km	MPC · JPL
337149	1999 TP_{305}	—	October 3, 1999	Catalina	CSS	·	1.7 km	MPC · JPL
337150	1999 TE_{310}	—	October 4, 1999	Kitt Peak	Spacewatch	·	1.4 km	MPC · JPL
337151	1999 TE_{312}	—	October 8, 1999	Kitt Peak	Spacewatch	EUN	1.5 km	MPC · JPL
337152	1999 TF_{312}	—	October 8, 1999	Kitt Peak	Spacewatch	·	1.7 km	MPC · JPL
337153	1999 TH_{312}	—	September 13, 1999	Socorro	LINEAR	·	3.0 km	MPC · JPL
337154	1999 TP_{314}	—	October 11, 1999	Kitt Peak	Spacewatch	·	1.4 km	MPC · JPL
337155	1999 TK_{316}	—	October 10, 1999	Kitt Peak	Spacewatch	·	1.7 km	MPC · JPL
337156	1999 TY_{335}	—	October 14, 1999	Apache Point	SDSS	·	620 m	MPC · JPL
337157	1999 UA_{5}	—	October 30, 1999	Catalina	CSS	·	2.3 km	MPC · JPL
337158	1999 UP_{7}	—	October 31, 1999	Kitt Peak	Spacewatch	BAR	2.3 km	MPC · JPL
337159	1999 UU_{18}	—	October 30, 1999	Kitt Peak	Spacewatch	·	1.5 km	MPC · JPL
337160	1999 UE_{19}	—	October 30, 1999	Kitt Peak	Spacewatch	·	2.2 km	MPC · JPL
337161	1999 UF_{21}	—	October 31, 1999	Kitt Peak	Spacewatch	·	1.5 km	MPC · JPL
337162	1999 UE_{23}	—	October 31, 1999	Kitt Peak	Spacewatch	BAR	1.2 km	MPC · JPL
337163	1999 UU_{23}	—	October 28, 1999	Catalina	CSS	·	2.2 km	MPC · JPL
337164	1999 UN_{28}	—	October 31, 1999	Kitt Peak	Spacewatch	·	1.5 km	MPC · JPL
337165	1999 UM_{49}	—	October 31, 1999	Catalina	CSS	·	2.2 km	MPC · JPL
337166 Ivanartioukhov	1999 VM_{1}	Ivanartioukhov	November 1, 1999	Uccle	E. W. Elst, Ipatov, S.	·	2.4 km	MPC · JPL
337167	1999 VN_{13}	—	November 2, 1999	Socorro	LINEAR	H	720 m	MPC · JPL
337168	1999 VF_{14}	—	November 2, 1999	Socorro	LINEAR	H	830 m	MPC · JPL
337169	1999 VP_{14}	—	November 10, 1999	Kitt Peak	M. W. Buie	EUN	1.4 km	MPC · JPL
337170	1999 VV_{34}	—	November 3, 1999	Socorro	LINEAR	JUN	1.5 km	MPC · JPL
337171	1999 VP_{41}	—	November 4, 1999	Kitt Peak	Spacewatch	·	1.5 km	MPC · JPL
337172	1999 VR_{42}	—	October 15, 1999	Socorro	LINEAR	·	1.6 km	MPC · JPL
337173	1999 VS_{42}	—	November 4, 1999	Kitt Peak	Spacewatch	·	1.3 km	MPC · JPL
337174	1999 VD_{47}	—	November 4, 1999	Socorro	LINEAR	JUN	1.2 km	MPC · JPL
337175	1999 VZ_{62}	—	November 4, 1999	Socorro	LINEAR	·	1.5 km	MPC · JPL
337176	1999 VQ_{75}	—	November 5, 1999	Kitt Peak	Spacewatch	·	1.1 km	MPC · JPL
337177	1999 VT_{75}	—	November 5, 1999	Kitt Peak	Spacewatch	NEM	2.1 km	MPC · JPL
337178	1999 VL_{80}	—	November 4, 1999	Socorro	LINEAR	·	1.7 km	MPC · JPL
337179	1999 VZ_{82}	—	November 1, 1999	Kitt Peak	Spacewatch	·	2.2 km	MPC · JPL
337180	1999 VK_{102}	—	November 9, 1999	Socorro	LINEAR	·	2.2 km	MPC · JPL
337181	1999 VA_{117}	—	November 5, 1999	Kitt Peak	Spacewatch	H	780 m	MPC · JPL
337182	1999 VL_{118}	—	November 9, 1999	Kitt Peak	Spacewatch	ADE	1.8 km	MPC · JPL
337183	1999 VM_{119}	—	November 3, 1999	Kitt Peak	Spacewatch	·	1.8 km	MPC · JPL
337184	1999 VM_{124}	—	November 9, 1999	Kitt Peak	Spacewatch	·	1.7 km	MPC · JPL
337185	1999 VJ_{140}	—	November 10, 1999	Kitt Peak	Spacewatch	MIS	2.8 km	MPC · JPL
337186	1999 VZ_{143}	—	November 11, 1999	Catalina	CSS	·	860 m	MPC · JPL
337187	1999 VV_{145}	—	November 9, 1999	Socorro	LINEAR	·	2.1 km	MPC · JPL
337188	1999 VF_{155}	—	November 13, 1999	Kitt Peak	Spacewatch	JUN	1.3 km	MPC · JPL
337189	1999 VF_{156}	—	November 12, 1999	Socorro	LINEAR	·	1.4 km	MPC · JPL
337190	1999 VU_{158}	—	November 14, 1999	Socorro	LINEAR	·	1.7 km	MPC · JPL
337191	1999 VZ_{182}	—	November 9, 1999	Socorro	LINEAR	HNS	1.6 km	MPC · JPL
337192	1999 VB_{191}	—	November 9, 1999	Socorro	LINEAR	ADE	2.6 km	MPC · JPL
337193	1999 VY_{198}	—	November 3, 1999	Catalina	CSS	·	900 m	MPC · JPL
337194	1999 VQ_{211}	—	November 15, 1999	Socorro	LINEAR	·	2.0 km	MPC · JPL
337195	1999 VA_{213}	—	November 12, 1999	Socorro	LINEAR	·	2.0 km	MPC · JPL
337196	1999 WV_{5}	—	October 10, 1999	Socorro	LINEAR	·	920 m	MPC · JPL
337197	1999 WO_{18}	—	November 30, 1999	Kitt Peak	Spacewatch	·	2.2 km	MPC · JPL
337198	1999 WL_{19}	—	November 30, 1999	Kitt Peak	Spacewatch	JUN	1.2 km	MPC · JPL
337199	1999 WD_{24}	—	November 17, 1999	Kitt Peak	Spacewatch	·	670 m	MPC · JPL
337200	1999 XV_{13}	—	December 5, 1999	Socorro	LINEAR	·	2.4 km	MPC · JPL

== 337201–337300 ==
back to top

Designation			Discovery			Properties		Ref
Permanent	Provisional	Named after	Date	Site	Discoverer(s)	Category	Diam.	Ref
337201	1999 XU_{16}	—	December 7, 1999	Socorro	LINEAR	·	1.4 km	MPC · JPL
337202	1999 XJ_{17}	—	December 7, 1999	Socorro	LINEAR	·	3.1 km	MPC · JPL
337203	1999 XL_{27}	—	December 6, 1999	Socorro	LINEAR	·	3.0 km	MPC · JPL
337204	1999 XJ_{79}	—	December 7, 1999	Socorro	LINEAR	·	1.7 km	MPC · JPL
337205	1999 XJ_{196}	—	December 12, 1999	Socorro	LINEAR	·	2.5 km	MPC · JPL
337206	1999 XJ_{240}	—	December 7, 1999	Catalina	CSS	·	840 m	MPC · JPL
337207	1999 XA_{245}	—	December 5, 1999	Catalina	CSS	·	2.5 km	MPC · JPL
337208	1999 XN_{250}	—	December 7, 1999	Kitt Peak	Spacewatch	·	840 m	MPC · JPL
337209	1999 YQ_{11}	—	December 27, 1999	Kitt Peak	Spacewatch	·	990 m	MPC · JPL
337210	2000 AT_{52}	—	January 4, 2000	Socorro	LINEAR	·	3.0 km	MPC · JPL
337211	2000 AV_{94}	—	January 4, 2000	Socorro	LINEAR	·	970 m	MPC · JPL
337212	2000 AC_{223}	—	January 9, 2000	Kitt Peak	Spacewatch	·	2.7 km	MPC · JPL
337213	2000 AE_{226}	—	January 12, 2000	Kitt Peak	Spacewatch	·	2.2 km	MPC · JPL
337214	2000 BV	—	January 25, 2000	Socorro	LINEAR	·	2.1 km	MPC · JPL
337215	2000 BE_{12}	—	January 28, 2000	Kitt Peak	Spacewatch	·	1.9 km	MPC · JPL
337216	2000 BO_{21}	—	January 29, 2000	Kitt Peak	Spacewatch	·	1.2 km	MPC · JPL
337217	2000 BF_{39}	—	January 27, 2000	Kitt Peak	Spacewatch	·	740 m	MPC · JPL
337218	2000 BV_{43}	—	January 28, 2000	Kitt Peak	Spacewatch	·	760 m	MPC · JPL
337219	2000 CF_{100}	—	February 10, 2000	Kitt Peak	Spacewatch	(2076)	810 m	MPC · JPL
337220	2000 CC_{109}	—	February 5, 2000	Kitt Peak	M. W. Buie	·	3.3 km	MPC · JPL
337221	2000 CB_{129}	—	February 3, 2000	Kitt Peak	Spacewatch	·	1.0 km	MPC · JPL
337222	2000 DC_{14}	—	February 28, 2000	Kitt Peak	Spacewatch	·	1.2 km	MPC · JPL
337223	2000 EN_{1}	—	March 3, 2000	Socorro	LINEAR	·	1.8 km	MPC · JPL
337224	2000 EF_{3}	—	March 3, 2000	Socorro	LINEAR	·	1.7 km	MPC · JPL
337225	2000 EH_{27}	—	March 3, 2000	Socorro	LINEAR	·	830 m	MPC · JPL
337226	2000 EL_{98}	—	March 9, 2000	Kitt Peak	Spacewatch	fast?	930 m	MPC · JPL
337227	2000 EH_{160}	—	February 25, 2000	Kitt Peak	Spacewatch	·	1.3 km	MPC · JPL
337228	2000 FL_{1}	—	March 26, 2000	Socorro	LINEAR	T_{j} (2.79)	3.8 km	MPC · JPL
337229	2000 FP_{50}	—	March 29, 2000	Kitt Peak	Spacewatch	KOR	1.6 km	MPC · JPL
337230	2000 GR_{47}	—	April 5, 2000	Socorro	LINEAR	·	1.7 km	MPC · JPL
337231	2000 GK_{57}	—	April 5, 2000	Socorro	LINEAR	·	2.6 km	MPC · JPL
337232	2000 GZ_{145}	—	April 12, 2000	Kitt Peak	Spacewatch	·	2.1 km	MPC · JPL
337233	2000 GW_{175}	—	April 2, 2000	Anderson Mesa	LONEOS	·	1.2 km	MPC · JPL
337234	2000 HJ_{18}	—	April 24, 2000	Kitt Peak	Spacewatch	·	1.2 km	MPC · JPL
337235	2000 HX_{22}	—	April 30, 2000	Socorro	LINEAR	·	1.4 km	MPC · JPL
337236	2000 HM_{59}	—	April 25, 2000	Anderson Mesa	LONEOS	·	3.2 km	MPC · JPL
337237	2000 HM_{63}	—	April 26, 2000	Anderson Mesa	LONEOS	·	2.1 km	MPC · JPL
337238	2000 HH_{74}	—	April 29, 2000	Socorro	LINEAR	·	2.5 km	MPC · JPL
337239	2000 JZ_{13}	—	May 6, 2000	Socorro	LINEAR	·	3.1 km	MPC · JPL
337240	2000 JS_{16}	—	May 7, 2000	Socorro	LINEAR	PHO	1.8 km	MPC · JPL
337241	2000 KE_{12}	—	May 28, 2000	Socorro	LINEAR	·	3.7 km	MPC · JPL
337242	2000 KF_{40}	—	May 26, 2000	Kitt Peak	Spacewatch	·	1.4 km	MPC · JPL
337243	2000 NC_{7}	—	July 4, 2000	Kitt Peak	Spacewatch	·	1.4 km	MPC · JPL
337244	2000 PX_{26}	—	August 9, 2000	Socorro	LINEAR	(5931)	5.3 km	MPC · JPL
337245	2000 QX_{148}	—	August 29, 2000	Siding Spring	R. H. McNaught	·	5.0 km	MPC · JPL
337246	2000 QJ_{178}	—	August 31, 2000	Socorro	LINEAR	·	1.2 km	MPC · JPL
337247	2000 QA_{229}	—	August 31, 2000	Kitt Peak	Spacewatch	LUT	6.1 km	MPC · JPL
337248	2000 RH_{60}	—	September 5, 2000	Anderson Mesa	LONEOS	ATE	850 m	MPC · JPL
337249	2000 RY_{60}	—	September 1, 2000	Socorro	LINEAR	·	2.1 km	MPC · JPL
337250	2000 RV_{96}	—	September 5, 2000	Anderson Mesa	LONEOS	·	6.1 km	MPC · JPL
337251	2000 RA_{105}	—	September 6, 2000	Socorro	LINEAR	·	1.3 km	MPC · JPL
337252	2000 SD_{8}	—	September 20, 2000	Haleakala	NEAT	APO	240 m	MPC · JPL
337253	2000 SA_{11}	—	September 22, 2000	Socorro	LINEAR	·	1.6 km	MPC · JPL
337254	2000 SU_{40}	—	September 24, 2000	Socorro	LINEAR	EUN	1.4 km	MPC · JPL
337255	2000 SX_{72}	—	September 24, 2000	Socorro	LINEAR	·	1.3 km	MPC · JPL
337256	2000 SP_{86}	—	September 24, 2000	Socorro	LINEAR	·	1.8 km	MPC · JPL
337257	2000 SJ_{98}	—	September 23, 2000	Socorro	LINEAR	·	1.1 km	MPC · JPL
337258	2000 SV_{136}	—	September 23, 2000	Socorro	LINEAR	·	4.3 km	MPC · JPL
337259	2000 SD_{175}	—	September 28, 2000	Socorro	LINEAR	·	1.3 km	MPC · JPL
337260	2000 SJ_{195}	—	September 24, 2000	Socorro	LINEAR	·	3.6 km	MPC · JPL
337261	2000 SZ_{198}	—	September 24, 2000	Socorro	LINEAR	·	1.4 km	MPC · JPL
337262	2000 SS_{200}	—	September 24, 2000	Socorro	LINEAR	·	1.7 km	MPC · JPL
337263	2000 SZ_{215}	—	September 26, 2000	Socorro	LINEAR	fast	1.1 km	MPC · JPL
337264	2000 SS_{254}	—	September 24, 2000	Socorro	LINEAR	·	1.9 km	MPC · JPL
337265	2000 SP_{255}	—	September 24, 2000	Socorro	LINEAR	·	870 m	MPC · JPL
337266	2000 SY_{328}	—	September 27, 2000	Socorro	LINEAR	MAR	1.7 km	MPC · JPL
337267	2000 SJ_{361}	—	September 23, 2000	Anderson Mesa	LONEOS	T_{j} (2.99) · EUP	4.1 km	MPC · JPL
337268	2000 TH_{67}	—	October 2, 2000	Socorro	LINEAR	·	1.7 km	MPC · JPL
337269	2000 UT_{23}	—	October 24, 2000	Socorro	LINEAR	·	1.3 km	MPC · JPL
337270	2000 UE_{45}	—	October 24, 2000	Socorro	LINEAR	·	1.1 km	MPC · JPL
337271	2000 UY_{63}	—	October 25, 2000	Socorro	LINEAR	·	1.2 km	MPC · JPL
337272	2000 UA_{64}	—	October 25, 2000	Socorro	LINEAR	·	1.5 km	MPC · JPL
337273	2000 UE_{76}	—	October 25, 2000	Socorro	LINEAR	·	1.4 km	MPC · JPL
337274	2000 UJ_{76}	—	October 30, 2000	Socorro	LINEAR	·	3.2 km	MPC · JPL
337275	2000 UD_{77}	—	October 24, 2000	Socorro	LINEAR	fast	1.1 km	MPC · JPL
337276	2000 UB_{82}	—	October 25, 2000	Socorro	LINEAR	·	1.1 km	MPC · JPL
337277	2000 UE_{92}	—	October 25, 2000	Socorro	LINEAR	·	1.7 km	MPC · JPL
337278	2000 VS_{3}	—	November 1, 2000	Socorro	LINEAR	(5)	1.2 km	MPC · JPL
337279	2000 VG_{59}	—	November 6, 2000	Socorro	LINEAR	·	2.1 km	MPC · JPL
337280	2000 VL_{60}	—	November 1, 2000	Kitt Peak	Spacewatch	·	1.6 km	MPC · JPL
337281	2000 WC_{15}	—	November 20, 2000	Socorro	LINEAR	·	2.2 km	MPC · JPL
337282	2000 WB_{33}	—	November 20, 2000	Socorro	LINEAR	·	1.3 km	MPC · JPL
337283	2000 WR_{67}	—	November 27, 2000	Socorro	LINEAR	·	970 m	MPC · JPL
337284	2000 WM_{74}	—	November 20, 2000	Socorro	LINEAR	·	1.4 km	MPC · JPL
337285	2000 WX_{89}	—	November 21, 2000	Socorro	LINEAR	MAR	1.4 km	MPC · JPL
337286	2000 WQ_{111}	—	November 20, 2000	Socorro	LINEAR	·	1.5 km	MPC · JPL
337287	2000 WW_{147}	—	November 28, 2000	Kitt Peak	Spacewatch	·	2.5 km	MPC · JPL
337288	2000 WL_{156}	—	November 30, 2000	Socorro	LINEAR	·	1.4 km	MPC · JPL
337289	2000 WL_{194}	—	November 25, 2000	Kitt Peak	Deep Lens Survey	EUN	1.8 km	MPC · JPL
337290	2000 XC_{3}	—	December 1, 2000	Socorro	LINEAR	·	2.1 km	MPC · JPL
337291	2000 XG_{10}	—	December 1, 2000	Socorro	LINEAR	·	2.4 km	MPC · JPL
337292	2000 XE_{14}	—	December 4, 2000	Bohyunsan	Jeon, Y.-B., Lee, B.-C.	(5)	1.6 km	MPC · JPL
337293	2000 XD_{18}	—	December 4, 2000	Socorro	LINEAR	·	1.9 km	MPC · JPL
337294	2000 XE_{19}	—	December 4, 2000	Socorro	LINEAR	·	900 m	MPC · JPL
337295	2000 XR_{21}	—	December 4, 2000	Socorro	LINEAR	·	3.1 km	MPC · JPL
337296	2000 XS_{53}	—	December 5, 2000	Uccle	T. Pauwels	·	1.5 km	MPC · JPL
337297	2000 YO	—	December 16, 2000	Socorro	LINEAR	·	2.7 km	MPC · JPL
337298	2000 YY_{7}	—	December 22, 2000	Heppenheim	Starkenburg	·	2.0 km	MPC · JPL
337299	2000 YQ_{8}	—	December 17, 2000	Kitt Peak	Spacewatch	·	3.7 km	MPC · JPL
337300	2000 YG_{9}	—	December 21, 2000	Kitt Peak	Spacewatch	(5)	1.5 km	MPC · JPL

== 337301–337400 ==
back to top

Designation			Discovery			Properties		Ref
Permanent	Provisional	Named after	Date	Site	Discoverer(s)	Category	Diam.	Ref
337301	2000 YZ_{22}	—	December 28, 2000	Kitt Peak	Spacewatch	·	1.7 km	MPC · JPL
337302	2000 YT_{26}	—	December 28, 2000	Socorro	LINEAR	·	1.7 km	MPC · JPL
337303	2000 YS_{27}	—	December 30, 2000	Kitt Peak	Spacewatch	(7744)	1.6 km	MPC · JPL
337304	2000 YP_{37}	—	December 30, 2000	Socorro	LINEAR	·	1.9 km	MPC · JPL
337305	2000 YM_{52}	—	December 30, 2000	Socorro	LINEAR	(5)	1.4 km	MPC · JPL
337306	2000 YR_{53}	—	December 30, 2000	Socorro	LINEAR	·	2.3 km	MPC · JPL
337307	2000 YM_{58}	—	December 30, 2000	Socorro	LINEAR	·	1.2 km	MPC · JPL
337308	2000 YY_{87}	—	December 30, 2000	Socorro	LINEAR	·	1.6 km	MPC · JPL
337309	2000 YD_{125}	—	December 29, 2000	Junk Bond	Junk Bond	·	2.0 km	MPC · JPL
337310	2000 YN_{127}	—	December 29, 2000	Haleakala	NEAT	·	2.4 km	MPC · JPL
337311	2001 AO_{35}	—	January 5, 2001	Socorro	LINEAR	EUN	1.8 km	MPC · JPL
337312	2001 AW_{39}	—	January 3, 2001	Anderson Mesa	LONEOS	·	1.4 km	MPC · JPL
337313	2001 AP_{47}	—	January 15, 2001	Socorro	LINEAR	·	1.7 km	MPC · JPL
337314	2001 BM_{4}	—	January 18, 2001	Socorro	LINEAR	·	2.3 km	MPC · JPL
337315	2001 BN_{4}	—	January 18, 2001	Socorro	LINEAR	·	3.0 km	MPC · JPL
337316	2001 BF_{13}	—	January 21, 2001	Socorro	LINEAR	·	1.7 km	MPC · JPL
337317	2001 BM_{19}	—	January 19, 2001	Socorro	LINEAR	(5)	1.8 km	MPC · JPL
337318	2001 BM_{27}	—	January 20, 2001	Socorro	LINEAR	·	1.7 km	MPC · JPL
337319	2001 BV_{57}	—	January 29, 2001	Oaxaca	Roe, J. M.	(5)	1.8 km	MPC · JPL
337320	2001 BF_{61}	—	January 30, 2001	Junk Bond	Junk Bond	EUN	2.1 km	MPC · JPL
337321	2001 BU_{66}	—	January 26, 2001	Socorro	LINEAR	JUN	1.9 km	MPC · JPL
337322	2001 CT_{10}	—	February 1, 2001	Socorro	LINEAR	(5)	1.8 km	MPC · JPL
337323	2001 CV_{14}	—	February 1, 2001	Socorro	LINEAR	·	1.4 km	MPC · JPL
337324	2001 CG_{47}	—	February 13, 2001	Kitt Peak	Spacewatch	WIT	1.1 km	MPC · JPL
337325	2001 DF	—	February 16, 2001	Črni Vrh	Mikuž, H.	(5)	2.4 km	MPC · JPL
337326	2001 DT_{11}	—	February 17, 2001	Socorro	LINEAR	(5)	1.8 km	MPC · JPL
337327	2001 DS_{26}	—	February 17, 2001	Socorro	LINEAR	EUN	1.4 km	MPC · JPL
337328	2001 DU_{40}	—	February 19, 2001	Socorro	LINEAR	·	1.6 km	MPC · JPL
337329	2001 DN_{55}	—	February 16, 2001	Kitt Peak	Spacewatch	·	1.2 km	MPC · JPL
337330	2001 DC_{57}	—	February 16, 2001	Kitt Peak	Spacewatch	·	1.6 km	MPC · JPL
337331	2001 DY_{72}	—	February 19, 2001	Socorro	LINEAR	JUN	1.2 km	MPC · JPL
337332	2001 DC_{78}	—	February 22, 2001	Kitt Peak	Spacewatch	·	2.1 km	MPC · JPL
337333	2001 EL_{4}	—	March 2, 2001	Anderson Mesa	LONEOS	·	2.2 km	MPC · JPL
337334	2001 EH_{5}	—	March 2, 2001	Anderson Mesa	LONEOS	·	2.1 km	MPC · JPL
337335	2001 EQ_{18}	—	March 14, 2001	Anderson Mesa	LONEOS	·	2.9 km	MPC · JPL
337336	2001 FF_{10}	—	March 19, 2001	Anderson Mesa	LONEOS	JUN	1.2 km	MPC · JPL
337337	2001 FC_{21}	—	March 19, 2001	Anderson Mesa	LONEOS	·	2.5 km	MPC · JPL
337338	2001 FB_{25}	—	March 18, 2001	Socorro	LINEAR	JUN	1.5 km	MPC · JPL
337339	2001 FL_{31}	—	March 23, 2001	Junk Bond	D. Healy	·	3.0 km	MPC · JPL
337340	2001 FG_{56}	—	March 23, 2001	Socorro	LINEAR	·	4.1 km	MPC · JPL
337341	2001 FE_{59}	—	March 19, 2001	Socorro	LINEAR	·	2.1 km	MPC · JPL
337342	2001 FV_{179}	—	March 20, 2001	Anderson Mesa	LONEOS	·	1.7 km	MPC · JPL
337343	2001 FW_{196}	—	March 23, 2001	Anderson Mesa	LONEOS	·	1.8 km	MPC · JPL
337344	2001 FV_{216}	—	March 21, 2001	Kitt Peak	SKADS	·	2.2 km	MPC · JPL
337345	2001 KO_{20}	—	May 23, 2001	Socorro	LINEAR	AMO	260 m	MPC · JPL
337346	2001 LH_{8}	—	June 15, 2001	Palomar	NEAT	·	1.6 km	MPC · JPL
337347	2001 ME_{22}	—	June 28, 2001	Haleakala	NEAT	THB	4.0 km	MPC · JPL
337348	2001 OC_{23}	—	July 21, 2001	Palomar	NEAT	·	4.2 km	MPC · JPL
337349	2001 OS_{30}	—	July 19, 2001	Palomar	NEAT	·	1.1 km	MPC · JPL
337350	2001 OP_{32}	—	July 19, 2001	Palomar	NEAT	·	1.3 km	MPC · JPL
337351	2001 OY_{36}	—	July 20, 2001	Palomar	NEAT	·	870 m	MPC · JPL
337352	2001 OR_{41}	—	July 21, 2001	Palomar	NEAT	·	3.1 km	MPC · JPL
337353	2001 OR_{85}	—	July 20, 2001	Socorro	LINEAR	·	5.5 km	MPC · JPL
337354	2001 ON_{104}	—	July 30, 2001	Socorro	LINEAR	·	1.4 km	MPC · JPL
337355	2001 OQ_{110}	—	July 26, 2001	Haleakala	NEAT	NYS	860 m	MPC · JPL
337356	2001 OH_{111}	—	July 22, 2001	Palomar	NEAT	·	1.3 km	MPC · JPL
337357	2001 PK_{7}	—	August 5, 2001	Haleakala	NEAT	H	980 m	MPC · JPL
337358	2001 PC_{8}	—	August 10, 2001	Palomar	NEAT	·	1.1 km	MPC · JPL
337359	2001 PL_{11}	—	August 9, 2001	Palomar	NEAT	·	2.5 km	MPC · JPL
337360	2001 PM_{17}	—	August 9, 2001	Palomar	NEAT	·	1.4 km	MPC · JPL
337361	2001 PB_{21}	—	August 10, 2001	Haleakala	NEAT	·	3.1 km	MPC · JPL
337362	2001 PS_{31}	—	August 10, 2001	Palomar	NEAT	·	3.9 km	MPC · JPL
337363	2001 PJ_{32}	—	August 10, 2001	Palomar	NEAT	·	1.2 km	MPC · JPL
337364	2001 PC_{36}	—	August 11, 2001	Palomar	NEAT	·	3.2 km	MPC · JPL
337365	2001 PH_{36}	—	August 11, 2001	Palomar	NEAT	H	760 m	MPC · JPL
337366	2001 PS_{40}	—	August 11, 2001	Palomar	NEAT	·	1.6 km	MPC · JPL
337367	2001 PD_{43}	—	June 17, 2001	Palomar	NEAT	·	2.9 km	MPC · JPL
337368	2001 PW_{46}	—	August 14, 2001	Haleakala	NEAT	·	4.0 km	MPC · JPL
337369	2001 PY_{54}	—	August 14, 2001	Haleakala	NEAT	·	1.1 km	MPC · JPL
337370	2001 PY_{61}	—	August 13, 2001	Haleakala	NEAT	·	1.1 km	MPC · JPL
337371	2001 QL_{3}	—	August 16, 2001	Socorro	LINEAR	·	1.3 km	MPC · JPL
337372	2001 QO_{40}	—	August 16, 2001	Socorro	LINEAR	·	1.4 km	MPC · JPL
337373	2001 QY_{45}	—	August 16, 2001	Socorro	LINEAR	V	770 m	MPC · JPL
337374	2001 QQ_{46}	—	August 16, 2001	Socorro	LINEAR	NYS	1.2 km	MPC · JPL
337375	2001 QQ_{49}	—	August 16, 2001	Socorro	LINEAR	·	1.1 km	MPC · JPL
337376	2001 QN_{54}	—	August 16, 2001	Socorro	LINEAR	·	1.6 km	MPC · JPL
337377	2001 QO_{62}	—	August 16, 2001	Socorro	LINEAR	·	1.2 km	MPC · JPL
337378	2001 QQ_{67}	—	August 19, 2001	Socorro	LINEAR	·	1.4 km	MPC · JPL
337379	2001 QY_{84}	—	August 19, 2001	Socorro	LINEAR	·	2.8 km	MPC · JPL
337380 Lenormand	2001 QS_{85}	Lenormand	August 17, 2001	Pises	M. Ory	MAS	830 m	MPC · JPL
337381	2001 QF_{90}	—	August 16, 2001	Palomar	NEAT	TIR	3.6 km	MPC · JPL
337382	2001 QC_{91}	—	August 22, 2001	Socorro	LINEAR	H	660 m	MPC · JPL
337383	2001 QC_{107}	—	August 16, 2001	Palomar	NEAT	H	800 m	MPC · JPL
337384	2001 QY_{110}	—	August 24, 2001	Ondřejov	P. Pravec, P. Kušnirák	·	3.7 km	MPC · JPL
337385	2001 QQ_{118}	—	August 17, 2001	Socorro	LINEAR	·	3.8 km	MPC · JPL
337386	2001 QG_{144}	—	August 21, 2001	Kitt Peak	Spacewatch	MAS	590 m	MPC · JPL
337387	2001 QX_{144}	—	August 24, 2001	Kitt Peak	Spacewatch	MAS	870 m	MPC · JPL
337388	2001 QV_{145}	—	August 25, 2001	Kitt Peak	Spacewatch	MAS	810 m	MPC · JPL
337389	2001 QK_{146}	—	August 25, 2001	Kitt Peak	Spacewatch	MAS	680 m	MPC · JPL
337390	2001 QP_{151}	—	August 25, 2001	Socorro	LINEAR	H	660 m	MPC · JPL
337391	2001 QR_{157}	—	August 23, 2001	Anderson Mesa	LONEOS	·	3.3 km	MPC · JPL
337392	2001 QW_{160}	—	August 23, 2001	Anderson Mesa	LONEOS	NYS	1.2 km	MPC · JPL
337393	2001 QO_{163}	—	August 31, 2001	Desert Eagle	W. K. Y. Yeung	THB	4.0 km	MPC · JPL
337394	2001 QO_{165}	—	August 24, 2001	Haleakala	NEAT	V	900 m	MPC · JPL
337395	2001 QF_{166}	—	August 24, 2001	Haleakala	NEAT	·	1.2 km	MPC · JPL
337396	2001 QU_{167}	—	August 24, 2001	Haleakala	NEAT	V	860 m	MPC · JPL
337397	2001 QF_{183}	—	August 22, 2001	Bergisch Gladbach	W. Bickel	EOS	2.6 km	MPC · JPL
337398	2001 QW_{184}	—	August 21, 2001	Socorro	LINEAR	·	5.0 km	MPC · JPL
337399	2001 QL_{186}	—	August 21, 2001	Kitt Peak	Spacewatch	NYS	1.2 km	MPC · JPL
337400	2001 QQ_{186}	—	August 21, 2001	Kitt Peak	Spacewatch	·	3.2 km	MPC · JPL

== 337401–337500 ==
back to top

Designation			Discovery			Properties		Ref
Permanent	Provisional	Named after	Date	Site	Discoverer(s)	Category	Diam.	Ref
337401	2001 QM_{189}	—	August 22, 2001	Socorro	LINEAR	·	4.6 km	MPC · JPL
337402	2001 QA_{197}	—	August 22, 2001	Kitt Peak	Spacewatch	·	1.1 km	MPC · JPL
337403	2001 QT_{207}	—	August 23, 2001	Anderson Mesa	LONEOS	NYS	1.3 km	MPC · JPL
337404	2001 QT_{209}	—	August 23, 2001	Anderson Mesa	LONEOS	V	750 m	MPC · JPL
337405	2001 QE_{225}	—	August 24, 2001	Palomar	NEAT	·	2.8 km	MPC · JPL
337406	2001 QV_{230}	—	August 24, 2001	Anderson Mesa	LONEOS	·	1.4 km	MPC · JPL
337407	2001 QG_{234}	—	August 24, 2001	Socorro	LINEAR	·	2.4 km	MPC · JPL
337408	2001 QS_{234}	—	August 24, 2001	Socorro	LINEAR	·	2.9 km	MPC · JPL
337409	2001 QG_{246}	—	August 24, 2001	Socorro	LINEAR	PHO	1.1 km	MPC · JPL
337410	2001 QG_{253}	—	August 25, 2001	Socorro	LINEAR	·	1.3 km	MPC · JPL
337411	2001 QC_{254}	—	August 25, 2001	Anderson Mesa	LONEOS	·	1.4 km	MPC · JPL
337412	2001 QO_{262}	—	August 25, 2001	Socorro	LINEAR	·	3.0 km	MPC · JPL
337413	2001 QE_{263}	—	August 25, 2001	Socorro	LINEAR	V	1.1 km	MPC · JPL
337414	2001 QA_{267}	—	August 20, 2001	Socorro	LINEAR	·	1.0 km	MPC · JPL
337415	2001 QH_{281}	—	August 19, 2001	Socorro	LINEAR	·	3.9 km	MPC · JPL
337416	2001 QL_{283}	—	August 18, 2001	Anderson Mesa	LONEOS	·	3.5 km	MPC · JPL
337417	2001 QY_{285}	—	August 23, 2001	Goodricke-Pigott	R. A. Tucker	·	1.6 km	MPC · JPL
337418	2001 QK_{291}	—	August 16, 2001	Palomar	NEAT	·	1.3 km	MPC · JPL
337419	2001 QA_{327}	—	August 23, 2001	Haleakala	NEAT	NYS	1.2 km	MPC · JPL
337420	2001 QX_{333}	—	August 25, 2001	Socorro	LINEAR	L5	20 km	MPC · JPL
337421	2001 QY_{333}	—	August 26, 2001	Palomar	NEAT	·	2.8 km	MPC · JPL
337422	2001 RT_{1}	—	September 7, 2001	Socorro	LINEAR	·	4.5 km	MPC · JPL
337423	2001 RP_{7}	—	September 7, 2001	Socorro	LINEAR	·	2.8 km	MPC · JPL
337424	2001 RS_{8}	—	September 8, 2001	Socorro	LINEAR	·	980 m	MPC · JPL
337425	2001 RV_{9}	—	September 10, 2001	Socorro	LINEAR	H	690 m	MPC · JPL
337426	2001 RJ_{11}	—	September 10, 2001	Desert Eagle	W. K. Y. Yeung	·	1.5 km	MPC · JPL
337427	2001 RD_{13}	—	September 10, 2001	Socorro	LINEAR	PHO	1.5 km	MPC · JPL
337428	2001 RG_{13}	—	September 10, 2001	Socorro	LINEAR	LIX	3.2 km	MPC · JPL
337429	2001 RL_{16}	—	September 10, 2001	San Marcello	A. Boattini, L. Tesi	NYS	1.0 km	MPC · JPL
337430	2001 RU_{18}	—	September 7, 2001	Socorro	LINEAR	NYS	980 m	MPC · JPL
337431	2001 RX_{21}	—	September 7, 2001	Socorro	LINEAR	·	3.6 km	MPC · JPL
337432	2001 RY_{27}	—	September 7, 2001	Socorro	LINEAR	NYS	1.5 km	MPC · JPL
337433	2001 RL_{29}	—	September 7, 2001	Socorro	LINEAR	·	1.0 km	MPC · JPL
337434	2001 RO_{30}	—	September 7, 2001	Socorro	LINEAR	·	1.1 km	MPC · JPL
337435	2001 RY_{37}	—	September 8, 2001	Socorro	LINEAR	EOS	2.4 km	MPC · JPL
337436	2001 RC_{40}	—	September 10, 2001	Socorro	LINEAR	THM	2.2 km	MPC · JPL
337437	2001 RH_{41}	—	September 11, 2001	Socorro	LINEAR	·	1.2 km	MPC · JPL
337438	2001 RS_{42}	—	September 11, 2001	Socorro	LINEAR	·	1.2 km	MPC · JPL
337439	2001 RO_{43}	—	September 10, 2001	Desert Eagle	W. K. Y. Yeung	·	1.1 km	MPC · JPL
337440	2001 RS_{47}	—	September 12, 2001	Socorro	LINEAR	H	600 m	MPC · JPL
337441	2001 RA_{49}	—	September 11, 2001	Socorro	LINEAR	·	3.9 km	MPC · JPL
337442	2001 RT_{49}	—	September 10, 2001	Socorro	LINEAR	·	3.2 km	MPC · JPL
337443	2001 RT_{53}	—	September 12, 2001	Socorro	LINEAR	MAS	870 m	MPC · JPL
337444	2001 RS_{54}	—	September 12, 2001	Socorro	LINEAR	·	3.1 km	MPC · JPL
337445	2001 RV_{54}	—	September 12, 2001	Socorro	LINEAR	MAS	820 m	MPC · JPL
337446	2001 RR_{57}	—	September 12, 2001	Socorro	LINEAR	·	3.1 km	MPC · JPL
337447	2001 RH_{58}	—	September 12, 2001	Socorro	LINEAR	·	3.7 km	MPC · JPL
337448	2001 RT_{60}	—	September 12, 2001	Socorro	LINEAR	·	1.2 km	MPC · JPL
337449	2001 RO_{81}	—	September 14, 2001	Palomar	NEAT	·	1.5 km	MPC · JPL
337450	2001 RS_{81}	—	September 14, 2001	Palomar	NEAT	·	1.6 km	MPC · JPL
337451	2001 RS_{85}	—	September 11, 2001	Anderson Mesa	LONEOS	·	5.8 km	MPC · JPL
337452	2001 RA_{88}	—	September 11, 2001	Anderson Mesa	LONEOS	·	3.4 km	MPC · JPL
337453	2001 RE_{88}	—	September 11, 2001	Anderson Mesa	LONEOS	·	3.0 km	MPC · JPL
337454	2001 RF_{88}	—	August 17, 2001	Socorro	LINEAR	PHO	1.0 km	MPC · JPL
337455	2001 RR_{89}	—	September 11, 2001	Anderson Mesa	LONEOS	MAS	880 m	MPC · JPL
337456	2001 RJ_{96}	—	September 12, 2001	Kitt Peak	Spacewatch	·	840 m	MPC · JPL
337457	2001 RM_{97}	—	September 12, 2001	Kitt Peak	Spacewatch	V	660 m	MPC · JPL
337458	2001 RQ_{100}	—	September 12, 2001	Socorro	LINEAR	·	1.3 km	MPC · JPL
337459	2001 RW_{107}	—	September 12, 2001	Socorro	LINEAR	MAS	700 m	MPC · JPL
337460	2001 RQ_{109}	—	September 12, 2001	Socorro	LINEAR	·	1.2 km	MPC · JPL
337461	2001 RP_{112}	—	August 12, 2001	Palomar	NEAT	·	1.3 km	MPC · JPL
337462	2001 RR_{121}	—	September 12, 2001	Socorro	LINEAR	MAS	930 m	MPC · JPL
337463	2001 RJ_{124}	—	September 12, 2001	Socorro	LINEAR	·	2.7 km	MPC · JPL
337464	2001 RX_{125}	—	September 12, 2001	Socorro	LINEAR	·	1 km	MPC · JPL
337465	2001 RR_{131}	—	September 12, 2001	Socorro	LINEAR	·	2.8 km	MPC · JPL
337466	2001 RA_{140}	—	September 12, 2001	Socorro	LINEAR	·	930 m	MPC · JPL
337467	2001 RQ_{140}	—	September 12, 2001	Socorro	LINEAR	EOS	2.2 km	MPC · JPL
337468	2001 RP_{145}	—	September 8, 2001	Socorro	LINEAR	·	820 m	MPC · JPL
337469	2001 RR_{150}	—	September 11, 2001	Socorro	LINEAR	·	1.6 km	MPC · JPL
337470	2001 SF_{7}	—	September 18, 2001	Kitt Peak	Spacewatch	EOS	4.9 km	MPC · JPL
337471	2001 SZ_{12}	—	September 16, 2001	Socorro	LINEAR	·	1.3 km	MPC · JPL
337472	2001 SS_{18}	—	September 16, 2001	Socorro	LINEAR	·	1.5 km	MPC · JPL
337473	2001 SH_{19}	—	September 16, 2001	Socorro	LINEAR	MAS	730 m	MPC · JPL
337474	2001 SC_{25}	—	September 16, 2001	Socorro	LINEAR	MAS	710 m	MPC · JPL
337475	2001 SF_{25}	—	September 16, 2001	Socorro	LINEAR	·	3.5 km	MPC · JPL
337476	2001 ST_{28}	—	September 16, 2001	Socorro	LINEAR	·	1.1 km	MPC · JPL
337477	2001 ST_{34}	—	September 16, 2001	Socorro	LINEAR	PHO	2.4 km	MPC · JPL
337478	2001 SY_{36}	—	August 16, 2001	Socorro	LINEAR	TIR	2.9 km	MPC · JPL
337479	2001 ST_{40}	—	August 24, 2001	Socorro	LINEAR	ERI	2.4 km	MPC · JPL
337480	2001 SN_{59}	—	September 17, 2001	Socorro	LINEAR	·	3.1 km	MPC · JPL
337481	2001 SG_{60}	—	September 17, 2001	Socorro	LINEAR	·	4.1 km	MPC · JPL
337482	2001 ST_{76}	—	September 16, 2001	Socorro	LINEAR	·	1.1 km	MPC · JPL
337483	2001 SA_{77}	—	September 17, 2001	Socorro	LINEAR	·	1.6 km	MPC · JPL
337484	2001 SH_{80}	—	September 20, 2001	Socorro	LINEAR	EOS	2.3 km	MPC · JPL
337485	2001 SB_{83}	—	September 20, 2001	Socorro	LINEAR	·	1.1 km	MPC · JPL
337486	2001 SL_{85}	—	September 20, 2001	Socorro	LINEAR	·	4.9 km	MPC · JPL
337487	2001 SR_{86}	—	September 20, 2001	Socorro	LINEAR	EOS	2.2 km	MPC · JPL
337488	2001 SW_{87}	—	September 20, 2001	Socorro	LINEAR	·	3.8 km	MPC · JPL
337489	2001 SC_{88}	—	September 20, 2001	Socorro	LINEAR	·	4.1 km	MPC · JPL
337490	2001 SQ_{95}	—	September 20, 2001	Socorro	LINEAR	·	4.0 km	MPC · JPL
337491	2001 SC_{96}	—	September 20, 2001	Socorro	LINEAR	EOS	2.3 km	MPC · JPL
337492	2001 SL_{98}	—	September 20, 2001	Socorro	LINEAR	·	1.8 km	MPC · JPL
337493	2001 SY_{99}	—	September 20, 2001	Socorro	LINEAR	·	1.6 km	MPC · JPL
337494	2001 SH_{100}	—	September 20, 2001	Socorro	LINEAR	·	1.0 km	MPC · JPL
337495	2001 SV_{100}	—	September 20, 2001	Socorro	LINEAR	·	2.5 km	MPC · JPL
337496	2001 SQ_{101}	—	September 20, 2001	Socorro	LINEAR	·	4.5 km	MPC · JPL
337497	2001 SD_{103}	—	September 20, 2001	Socorro	LINEAR	·	1.2 km	MPC · JPL
337498	2001 SF_{104}	—	September 20, 2001	Socorro	LINEAR	·	2.5 km	MPC · JPL
337499	2001 SL_{117}	—	September 16, 2001	Socorro	LINEAR	·	1.2 km	MPC · JPL
337500	2001 SC_{119}	—	September 16, 2001	Socorro	LINEAR	EOS	2.7 km	MPC · JPL

== 337501–337600 ==
back to top

Designation			Discovery			Properties		Ref
Permanent	Provisional	Named after	Date	Site	Discoverer(s)	Category	Diam.	Ref
337501	2001 SV_{122}	—	September 16, 2001	Socorro	LINEAR	·	1.6 km	MPC · JPL
337502	2001 SD_{125}	—	September 16, 2001	Socorro	LINEAR	EOS	2.4 km	MPC · JPL
337503	2001 SA_{129}	—	September 16, 2001	Socorro	LINEAR	·	1.4 km	MPC · JPL
337504	2001 SN_{130}	—	September 16, 2001	Socorro	LINEAR	NYS	980 m	MPC · JPL
337505	2001 SN_{131}	—	September 16, 2001	Socorro	LINEAR	EUP	4.7 km	MPC · JPL
337506	2001 SE_{132}	—	September 16, 2001	Socorro	LINEAR	EMA	3.8 km	MPC · JPL
337507	2001 SN_{132}	—	September 16, 2001	Socorro	LINEAR	·	3.8 km	MPC · JPL
337508	2001 SB_{133}	—	September 16, 2001	Socorro	LINEAR	·	1.5 km	MPC · JPL
337509	2001 SQ_{133}	—	September 16, 2001	Socorro	LINEAR	EUP	3.5 km	MPC · JPL
337510	2001 SK_{136}	—	September 16, 2001	Socorro	LINEAR	EOS	2.6 km	MPC · JPL
337511	2001 SU_{137}	—	September 16, 2001	Socorro	LINEAR	·	3.3 km	MPC · JPL
337512	2001 SK_{139}	—	September 16, 2001	Socorro	LINEAR	·	3.1 km	MPC · JPL
337513	2001 SK_{141}	—	September 16, 2001	Socorro	LINEAR	·	2.8 km	MPC · JPL
337514	2001 SL_{141}	—	September 16, 2001	Socorro	LINEAR	MAS	710 m	MPC · JPL
337515	2001 SY_{146}	—	September 16, 2001	Socorro	LINEAR	NYS	950 m	MPC · JPL
337516	2001 SE_{150}	—	September 17, 2001	Socorro	LINEAR	·	1.8 km	MPC · JPL
337517	2001 SG_{151}	—	September 17, 2001	Socorro	LINEAR	H	640 m	MPC · JPL
337518	2001 ST_{151}	—	September 17, 2001	Socorro	LINEAR	TIR	3.7 km	MPC · JPL
337519	2001 SD_{158}	—	September 17, 2001	Socorro	LINEAR	·	2.6 km	MPC · JPL
337520	2001 SL_{158}	—	September 17, 2001	Socorro	LINEAR	T_{j} (2.99) · EUP	3.7 km	MPC · JPL
337521	2001 SY_{158}	—	September 17, 2001	Socorro	LINEAR	·	1.3 km	MPC · JPL
337522	2001 SQ_{160}	—	September 17, 2001	Socorro	LINEAR	·	3.4 km	MPC · JPL
337523	2001 SF_{167}	—	September 19, 2001	Socorro	LINEAR	MAS	770 m	MPC · JPL
337524	2001 SO_{167}	—	September 19, 2001	Socorro	LINEAR	MAS	890 m	MPC · JPL
337525	2001 SH_{171}	—	September 16, 2001	Socorro	LINEAR	·	1.6 km	MPC · JPL
337526	2001 SM_{171}	—	September 16, 2001	Socorro	LINEAR	·	1.4 km	MPC · JPL
337527	2001 SZ_{176}	—	September 16, 2001	Socorro	LINEAR	TIR	3.9 km	MPC · JPL
337528	2001 SB_{178}	—	September 17, 2001	Socorro	LINEAR	·	2.3 km	MPC · JPL
337529	2001 SY_{182}	—	September 19, 2001	Socorro	LINEAR	NYS	1.1 km	MPC · JPL
337530	2001 SV_{194}	—	September 19, 2001	Socorro	LINEAR	·	3.9 km	MPC · JPL
337531	2001 SK_{206}	—	September 19, 2001	Socorro	LINEAR	NYS	1.2 km	MPC · JPL
337532	2001 SA_{210}	—	September 19, 2001	Socorro	LINEAR	MAS	870 m	MPC · JPL
337533	2001 SW_{212}	—	September 19, 2001	Socorro	LINEAR	·	4.1 km	MPC · JPL
337534	2001 SV_{218}	—	September 19, 2001	Socorro	LINEAR	NYS	1.3 km	MPC · JPL
337535	2001 SG_{222}	—	September 19, 2001	Socorro	LINEAR	·	2.8 km	MPC · JPL
337536	2001 SE_{223}	—	September 19, 2001	Socorro	LINEAR	·	1.4 km	MPC · JPL
337537	2001 SM_{226}	—	September 19, 2001	Socorro	LINEAR	·	1.7 km	MPC · JPL
337538	2001 SJ_{227}	—	September 19, 2001	Socorro	LINEAR	THM	2.3 km	MPC · JPL
337539	2001 SN_{227}	—	September 19, 2001	Socorro	LINEAR	·	1.3 km	MPC · JPL
337540	2001 SS_{227}	—	September 19, 2001	Socorro	LINEAR	·	1.4 km	MPC · JPL
337541	2001 SW_{231}	—	September 19, 2001	Socorro	LINEAR	·	1.3 km	MPC · JPL
337542	2001 SB_{233}	—	September 19, 2001	Socorro	LINEAR	·	1.2 km	MPC · JPL
337543	2001 SS_{234}	—	September 19, 2001	Socorro	LINEAR	MAS	820 m	MPC · JPL
337544	2001 SD_{239}	—	September 11, 2001	Kitt Peak	Spacewatch	·	2.6 km	MPC · JPL
337545	2001 SK_{243}	—	September 17, 2001	Anderson Mesa	LONEOS	·	1.3 km	MPC · JPL
337546	2001 SB_{250}	—	September 19, 2001	Socorro	LINEAR	·	1.4 km	MPC · JPL
337547	2001 SJ_{250}	—	September 19, 2001	Socorro	LINEAR	·	4.4 km	MPC · JPL
337548	2001 SU_{254}	—	September 19, 2001	Socorro	LINEAR	H	750 m	MPC · JPL
337549	2001 SL_{256}	—	September 19, 2001	Socorro	LINEAR	MAS · fast	860 m	MPC · JPL
337550	2001 SX_{258}	—	September 20, 2001	Socorro	LINEAR	·	2.8 km	MPC · JPL
337551	2001 SM_{259}	—	September 20, 2001	Socorro	LINEAR	NYS	1.1 km	MPC · JPL
337552	2001 SB_{260}	—	September 20, 2001	Socorro	LINEAR	·	2.7 km	MPC · JPL
337553	2001 SO_{260}	—	September 20, 2001	Socorro	LINEAR	·	2.2 km	MPC · JPL
337554	2001 SG_{261}	—	September 20, 2001	Socorro	LINEAR	NYS	1.1 km	MPC · JPL
337555	2001 SM_{261}	—	September 20, 2001	Socorro	LINEAR	·	1.2 km	MPC · JPL
337556	2001 SX_{261}	—	September 21, 2001	Socorro	LINEAR	·	2.7 km	MPC · JPL
337557	2001 SF_{262}	—	September 21, 2001	Palomar	NEAT	AMO	670 m	MPC · JPL
337558	2001 SG_{262}	—	September 23, 2001	Palomar	NEAT	APO · PHA	460 m	MPC · JPL
337559	2001 SE_{264}	—	September 24, 2001	Socorro	LINEAR	H	940 m	MPC · JPL
337560	2001 SU_{264}	—	September 25, 2001	Desert Eagle	W. K. Y. Yeung	THM	3.0 km	MPC · JPL
337561	2001 SJ_{266}	—	September 25, 2001	Desert Eagle	W. K. Y. Yeung	·	1.7 km	MPC · JPL
337562	2001 SQ_{271}	—	September 20, 2001	Socorro	LINEAR	·	1.3 km	MPC · JPL
337563	2001 SD_{274}	—	September 20, 2001	Kitt Peak	Spacewatch	·	4.5 km	MPC · JPL
337564	2001 SE_{285}	—	September 22, 2001	Kitt Peak	Spacewatch	·	2.6 km	MPC · JPL
337565	2001 SN_{288}	—	September 28, 2001	Palomar	NEAT	V	680 m	MPC · JPL
337566	2001 SQ_{288}	—	September 28, 2001	Palomar	NEAT	V	760 m	MPC · JPL
337567	2001 SK_{291}	—	September 21, 2001	Anderson Mesa	LONEOS	·	4.3 km	MPC · JPL
337568	2001 SC_{296}	—	September 20, 2001	Socorro	LINEAR	·	3.4 km	MPC · JPL
337569	2001 SG_{296}	—	September 20, 2001	Socorro	LINEAR	·	1.0 km	MPC · JPL
337570	2001 SA_{298}	—	September 20, 2001	Socorro	LINEAR	EOS	2.2 km	MPC · JPL
337571	2001 SP_{304}	—	September 20, 2001	Socorro	LINEAR	MAS	700 m	MPC · JPL
337572	2001 SW_{315}	—	September 25, 2001	Socorro	LINEAR	·	2.9 km	MPC · JPL
337573	2001 SW_{316}	—	September 18, 2001	Anderson Mesa	LONEOS	V	810 m	MPC · JPL
337574	2001 SB_{317}	—	September 25, 2001	Palomar	NEAT	·	1.3 km	MPC · JPL
337575	2001 SC_{317}	—	September 25, 2001	Palomar	NEAT	·	3.3 km	MPC · JPL
337576	2001 SQ_{317}	—	September 19, 2001	Socorro	LINEAR	TIR	2.9 km	MPC · JPL
337577	2001 SL_{319}	—	September 21, 2001	Socorro	LINEAR	·	3.2 km	MPC · JPL
337578	2001 SH_{321}	—	September 25, 2001	Socorro	LINEAR	·	3.1 km	MPC · JPL
337579	2001 SO_{321}	—	September 25, 2001	Socorro	LINEAR	·	3.3 km	MPC · JPL
337580	2001 SU_{325}	—	September 17, 2001	Palomar	NEAT	·	3.2 km	MPC · JPL
337581	2001 SK_{329}	—	September 19, 2001	Socorro	LINEAR	·	3.6 km	MPC · JPL
337582	2001 SK_{332}	—	September 19, 2001	Palomar	NEAT	V	740 m	MPC · JPL
337583	2001 SU_{332}	—	September 19, 2001	Socorro	LINEAR	NYS	1.1 km	MPC · JPL
337584	2001 SM_{338}	—	September 20, 2001	Socorro	LINEAR	V	800 m	MPC · JPL
337585	2001 SW_{338}	—	September 20, 2001	Kitt Peak	Spacewatch	MAS	680 m	MPC · JPL
337586	2001 ST_{341}	—	September 21, 2001	Anderson Mesa	LONEOS	T_{j} (2.94)	7.0 km	MPC · JPL
337587	2001 SF_{342}	—	September 21, 2001	Socorro	LINEAR	THM	2.1 km	MPC · JPL
337588	2001 SH_{342}	—	September 21, 2001	Socorro	LINEAR	·	2.4 km	MPC · JPL
337589	2001 SS_{342}	—	September 21, 2001	Palomar	NEAT	·	1.4 km	MPC · JPL
337590	2001 SQ_{347}	—	September 25, 2001	Socorro	LINEAR	·	1.3 km	MPC · JPL
337591	2001 SO_{349}	—	September 18, 2001	Anderson Mesa	LONEOS	NYS	1.2 km	MPC · JPL
337592	2001 SD_{350}	—	September 20, 2001	Socorro	LINEAR	·	950 m	MPC · JPL
337593	2001 SB_{353}	—	September 20, 2001	Socorro	LINEAR	EOS	2.2 km	MPC · JPL
337594	2001 SR_{353}	—	September 25, 2001	Socorro	LINEAR	·	2.0 km	MPC · JPL
337595	2001 SL_{355}	—	September 26, 2001	Palomar	NEAT	·	1.4 km	MPC · JPL
337596	2001 SQ_{355}	—	January 14, 2002	Apache Point	SDSS	·	1.6 km	MPC · JPL
337597	2001 SY_{355}	—	September 16, 2001	Socorro	LINEAR	·	3.6 km	MPC · JPL
337598	2001 TB_{1}	—	October 8, 2001	Palomar	NEAT	·	1.6 km	MPC · JPL
337599	2001 TJ_{1}	—	October 10, 2001	Kitt Peak	Spacewatch	·	3.4 km	MPC · JPL
337600	2001 TK_{3}	—	October 7, 2001	Palomar	NEAT	MAS	690 m	MPC · JPL

== 337601–337700 ==
back to top

Designation			Discovery			Properties		Ref
Permanent	Provisional	Named after	Date	Site	Discoverer(s)	Category	Diam.	Ref
337601	2001 TL_{3}	—	October 7, 2001	Palomar	NEAT	NYS	1.1 km	MPC · JPL
337602	2001 TR_{4}	—	September 20, 2001	Socorro	LINEAR	·	2.9 km	MPC · JPL
337603	2001 TB_{5}	—	October 8, 2001	Palomar	NEAT	·	1.6 km	MPC · JPL
337604	2001 TJ_{5}	—	October 10, 2001	Palomar	NEAT	·	1.4 km	MPC · JPL
337605	2001 TP_{10}	—	October 13, 2001	Socorro	LINEAR	·	1.3 km	MPC · JPL
337606	2001 TH_{12}	—	October 13, 2001	Socorro	LINEAR	EOS	2.6 km	MPC · JPL
337607	2001 TB_{13}	—	October 11, 2001	Socorro	LINEAR	·	1.7 km	MPC · JPL
337608	2001 TB_{14}	—	October 12, 2001	Ondřejov	P. Kušnirák	·	3.4 km	MPC · JPL
337609	2001 TG_{14}	—	October 6, 2001	Palomar	NEAT	·	4.4 km	MPC · JPL
337610	2001 TC_{16}	—	October 11, 2001	Socorro	LINEAR	EOS	5.3 km	MPC · JPL
337611	2001 TK_{24}	—	October 14, 2001	Socorro	LINEAR	H	730 m	MPC · JPL
337612	2001 TV_{45}	—	October 15, 2001	Socorro	LINEAR	·	3.4 km	MPC · JPL
337613	2001 TG_{47}	—	October 14, 2001	Cima Ekar	ADAS	·	1.5 km	MPC · JPL
337614	2001 TY_{47}	—	October 14, 2001	Cima Ekar	ADAS	·	1.3 km	MPC · JPL
337615	2001 TQ_{48}	—	October 15, 2001	Desert Eagle	W. K. Y. Yeung	·	3.2 km	MPC · JPL
337616	2001 TU_{48}	—	October 14, 2001	Socorro	LINEAR	PHO	3.1 km	MPC · JPL
337617	2001 TT_{50}	—	October 13, 2001	Socorro	LINEAR	TIR	3.5 km	MPC · JPL
337618	2001 TU_{51}	—	October 13, 2001	Socorro	LINEAR	·	1.2 km	MPC · JPL
337619	2001 TK_{57}	—	October 13, 2001	Socorro	LINEAR	EOS	2.5 km	MPC · JPL
337620	2001 TP_{59}	—	October 13, 2001	Socorro	LINEAR	·	3.2 km	MPC · JPL
337621	2001 TR_{72}	—	October 13, 2001	Socorro	LINEAR	·	3.5 km	MPC · JPL
337622	2001 TZ_{80}	—	October 14, 2001	Socorro	LINEAR	·	3.7 km	MPC · JPL
337623	2001 TH_{81}	—	October 14, 2001	Socorro	LINEAR	·	990 m	MPC · JPL
337624	2001 TC_{82}	—	October 14, 2001	Socorro	LINEAR	·	1.6 km	MPC · JPL
337625	2001 TJ_{82}	—	October 14, 2001	Socorro	LINEAR	·	3.4 km	MPC · JPL
337626	2001 TP_{83}	—	October 14, 2001	Socorro	LINEAR	·	1.2 km	MPC · JPL
337627	2001 TH_{85}	—	October 14, 2001	Socorro	LINEAR	·	3.5 km	MPC · JPL
337628	2001 TG_{88}	—	October 14, 2001	Socorro	LINEAR	V	900 m	MPC · JPL
337629	2001 TJ_{91}	—	October 14, 2001	Socorro	LINEAR	·	1.4 km	MPC · JPL
337630	2001 TR_{93}	—	October 14, 2001	Socorro	LINEAR	·	3.0 km	MPC · JPL
337631	2001 TW_{93}	—	October 14, 2001	Socorro	LINEAR	·	1.1 km	MPC · JPL
337632	2001 TG_{96}	—	October 14, 2001	Socorro	LINEAR	·	2.4 km	MPC · JPL
337633	2001 TK_{98}	—	October 14, 2001	Socorro	LINEAR	MAS	840 m	MPC · JPL
337634	2001 TX_{98}	—	October 14, 2001	Socorro	LINEAR	·	1.5 km	MPC · JPL
337635	2001 TO_{104}	—	October 13, 2001	Socorro	LINEAR	NYS	1.2 km	MPC · JPL
337636	2001 TG_{109}	—	October 14, 2001	Socorro	LINEAR	·	1.4 km	MPC · JPL
337637	2001 TW_{109}	—	October 14, 2001	Socorro	LINEAR	·	3.4 km	MPC · JPL
337638	2001 TL_{111}	—	October 14, 2001	Socorro	LINEAR	L5	15 km	MPC · JPL
337639	2001 TU_{112}	—	October 14, 2001	Socorro	LINEAR	NYS	980 m	MPC · JPL
337640	2001 TJ_{115}	—	October 14, 2001	Socorro	LINEAR	·	6.1 km	MPC · JPL
337641	2001 TY_{117}	—	October 15, 2001	Socorro	LINEAR	PHO	1.4 km	MPC · JPL
337642	2001 TL_{119}	—	October 15, 2001	Socorro	LINEAR	·	4.9 km	MPC · JPL
337643	2001 TT_{120}	—	October 15, 2001	Socorro	LINEAR	·	3.5 km	MPC · JPL
337644	2001 TM_{122}	—	October 15, 2001	Socorro	LINEAR	·	6.7 km	MPC · JPL
337645	2001 TO_{124}	—	October 12, 2001	Haleakala	NEAT	·	4.0 km	MPC · JPL
337646	2001 TX_{124}	—	October 12, 2001	Haleakala	NEAT	·	4.0 km	MPC · JPL
337647	2001 TG_{125}	—	October 12, 2001	Haleakala	NEAT	·	1.3 km	MPC · JPL
337648	2001 TW_{129}	—	October 15, 2001	Kitt Peak	Spacewatch	·	2.3 km	MPC · JPL
337649	2001 TX_{129}	—	October 15, 2001	Kitt Peak	Spacewatch	V	650 m	MPC · JPL
337650	2001 TJ_{131}	—	October 10, 2001	Palomar	NEAT	·	1.4 km	MPC · JPL
337651	2001 TN_{132}	—	October 12, 2001	Haleakala	NEAT	·	4.9 km	MPC · JPL
337652	2001 TA_{133}	—	October 12, 2001	Haleakala	NEAT	EOS	2.6 km	MPC · JPL
337653	2001 TA_{137}	—	October 14, 2001	Palomar	NEAT	·	1.5 km	MPC · JPL
337654	2001 TP_{138}	—	October 10, 2001	Palomar	NEAT	PHO	2.7 km	MPC · JPL
337655	2001 TW_{141}	—	October 10, 2001	Palomar	NEAT	·	1.3 km	MPC · JPL
337656	2001 TC_{144}	—	October 10, 2001	Palomar	NEAT	·	1.3 km	MPC · JPL
337657	2001 TY_{149}	—	October 10, 2001	Palomar	NEAT	·	4.0 km	MPC · JPL
337658	2001 TS_{153}	—	October 13, 2001	Palomar	NEAT	·	1.9 km	MPC · JPL
337659	2001 TA_{159}	—	October 11, 2001	Palomar	NEAT	·	2.6 km	MPC · JPL
337660	2001 TH_{159}	—	October 11, 2001	Palomar	NEAT	MAS	730 m	MPC · JPL
337661	2001 TV_{162}	—	October 11, 2001	Palomar	NEAT	NYS	1.1 km	MPC · JPL
337662	2001 TP_{170}	—	October 13, 2001	Palomar	NEAT	·	4.2 km	MPC · JPL
337663	2001 TY_{172}	—	October 13, 2001	Socorro	LINEAR	·	1.1 km	MPC · JPL
337664	2001 TO_{173}	—	October 14, 2001	Socorro	LINEAR	·	1.2 km	MPC · JPL
337665	2001 TN_{176}	—	October 14, 2001	Socorro	LINEAR	·	2.5 km	MPC · JPL
337666	2001 TJ_{177}	—	October 14, 2001	Socorro	LINEAR	EMA	3.7 km	MPC · JPL
337667	2001 TG_{178}	—	October 14, 2001	Socorro	LINEAR	·	3.2 km	MPC · JPL
337668	2001 TR_{178}	—	August 11, 1997	Kitt Peak	Spacewatch	·	1.4 km	MPC · JPL
337669	2001 TJ_{181}	—	October 14, 2001	Socorro	LINEAR	·	3.6 km	MPC · JPL
337670	2001 TC_{182}	—	October 14, 2001	Socorro	LINEAR	NYS	1.4 km	MPC · JPL
337671	2001 TA_{183}	—	October 14, 2001	Socorro	LINEAR	·	4.2 km	MPC · JPL
337672	2001 TL_{183}	—	October 14, 2001	Socorro	LINEAR	·	1.7 km	MPC · JPL
337673	2001 TD_{184}	—	October 14, 2001	Socorro	LINEAR	EOS	2.2 km	MPC · JPL
337674	2001 TU_{185}	—	October 14, 2001	Socorro	LINEAR	·	2.2 km	MPC · JPL
337675	2001 TO_{188}	—	October 14, 2001	Socorro	LINEAR	THB	3.1 km	MPC · JPL
337676	2001 TC_{189}	—	October 14, 2001	Socorro	LINEAR	·	4.7 km	MPC · JPL
337677	2001 TJ_{200}	—	October 11, 2001	Socorro	LINEAR	·	3.0 km	MPC · JPL
337678	2001 TA_{203}	—	October 11, 2001	Socorro	LINEAR	·	4.3 km	MPC · JPL
337679	2001 TR_{203}	—	October 11, 2001	Socorro	LINEAR	PHO	1.3 km	MPC · JPL
337680	2001 TR_{209}	—	October 12, 2001	Ondřejov	Ondrejov	·	2.2 km	MPC · JPL
337681	2001 TC_{215}	—	October 13, 2001	Palomar	NEAT	·	4.2 km	MPC · JPL
337682	2001 TE_{218}	—	October 14, 2001	Kitt Peak	Spacewatch	THM	2.4 km	MPC · JPL
337683	2001 TX_{218}	—	October 14, 2001	Anderson Mesa	LONEOS	·	1.4 km	MPC · JPL
337684	2001 TL_{221}	—	October 14, 2001	Socorro	LINEAR	·	3.4 km	MPC · JPL
337685	2001 TR_{222}	—	October 14, 2001	Socorro	LINEAR	EOS	2.2 km	MPC · JPL
337686	2001 TE_{232}	—	September 8, 2001	Socorro	LINEAR	H	610 m	MPC · JPL
337687	2001 TD_{235}	—	October 15, 2001	Palomar	NEAT	·	1.6 km	MPC · JPL
337688	2001 TQ_{240}	—	October 14, 2001	Socorro	LINEAR	·	4.7 km	MPC · JPL
337689	2001 TZ_{245}	—	September 18, 2001	Kitt Peak	Spacewatch	(21885)	3.2 km	MPC · JPL
337690	2001 TZ_{247}	—	October 14, 2001	Apache Point	SDSS	·	1 km	MPC · JPL
337691	2001 TP_{249}	—	October 14, 2001	Apache Point	SDSS	·	3.3 km	MPC · JPL
337692	2001 TO_{250}	—	October 14, 2001	Apache Point	SDSS	·	2.0 km	MPC · JPL
337693	2001 TC_{251}	—	October 14, 2001	Apache Point	SDSS	·	4.0 km	MPC · JPL
337694	2001 TL_{252}	—	October 14, 2001	Apache Point	SDSS	·	3.3 km	MPC · JPL
337695	2001 TM_{253}	—	October 14, 2001	Apache Point	SDSS	EOS	2.6 km	MPC · JPL
337696	2001 TW_{254}	—	October 14, 2001	Apache Point	SDSS	·	3.6 km	MPC · JPL
337697	2001 TK_{255}	—	October 14, 2001	Apache Point	SDSS	·	3.2 km	MPC · JPL
337698	2001 TT_{257}	—	October 11, 2001	Palomar	NEAT	MAS	650 m	MPC · JPL
337699	2001 TY_{257}	—	October 15, 2001	Palomar	NEAT	T_{j} (2.98)	4.0 km	MPC · JPL
337700 Korpás	2001 TQ_{258}	Korpás	October 10, 2001	Palomar	NEAT	·	900 m	MPC · JPL

== 337701–337800 ==
back to top

Designation			Discovery			Properties		Ref
Permanent	Provisional	Named after	Date	Site	Discoverer(s)	Category	Diam.	Ref
337701	2001 TT_{259}	—	October 11, 2001	Palomar	NEAT	·	2.4 km	MPC · JPL
337702	2001 TZ_{259}	—	October 10, 2001	Palomar	NEAT	·	1.4 km	MPC · JPL
337703	2001 UP_{3}	—	October 16, 2001	Socorro	LINEAR	·	3.0 km	MPC · JPL
337704	2001 UJ_{6}	—	October 22, 2001	Emerald Lane	L. Ball	·	4.0 km	MPC · JPL
337705	2001 UW_{7}	—	October 17, 2001	Socorro	LINEAR	·	1.1 km	MPC · JPL
337706	2001 UE_{8}	—	September 20, 2001	Socorro	LINEAR	TIR	3.2 km	MPC · JPL
337707	2001 UO_{8}	—	October 17, 2001	Socorro	LINEAR	·	3.8 km	MPC · JPL
337708	2001 UV_{9}	—	October 17, 2001	Socorro	LINEAR	·	5.9 km	MPC · JPL
337709	2001 UV_{12}	—	October 24, 2001	Desert Eagle	W. K. Y. Yeung	·	1.4 km	MPC · JPL
337710	2001 UB_{20}	—	October 11, 2001	Socorro	LINEAR	·	4.1 km	MPC · JPL
337711	2001 UR_{22}	—	October 17, 2001	Socorro	LINEAR	·	3.3 km	MPC · JPL
337712	2001 UC_{23}	—	October 18, 2001	Socorro	LINEAR	·	3.8 km	MPC · JPL
337713	2001 UO_{25}	—	October 18, 2001	Socorro	LINEAR	·	1.6 km	MPC · JPL
337714	2001 UN_{28}	—	October 16, 2001	Socorro	LINEAR	·	1.6 km	MPC · JPL
337715	2001 UJ_{33}	—	October 16, 2001	Socorro	LINEAR	PHO	1.4 km	MPC · JPL
337716	2001 UH_{38}	—	October 17, 2001	Socorro	LINEAR	PHO	950 m	MPC · JPL
337717	2001 UK_{38}	—	October 17, 2001	Socorro	LINEAR	THM	2.7 km	MPC · JPL
337718	2001 UJ_{40}	—	October 17, 2001	Socorro	LINEAR	MAS	950 m	MPC · JPL
337719	2001 UQ_{40}	—	October 17, 2001	Socorro	LINEAR	·	1.4 km	MPC · JPL
337720	2001 UU_{40}	—	September 19, 2001	Socorro	LINEAR	V	780 m	MPC · JPL
337721	2001 UB_{44}	—	October 17, 2001	Socorro	LINEAR	·	3.9 km	MPC · JPL
337722	2001 UB_{48}	—	October 17, 2001	Socorro	LINEAR	·	4.3 km	MPC · JPL
337723	2001 UV_{52}	—	October 17, 2001	Socorro	LINEAR	·	1.5 km	MPC · JPL
337724	2001 UK_{54}	—	October 18, 2001	Socorro	LINEAR	·	1.8 km	MPC · JPL
337725	2001 UQ_{56}	—	October 17, 2001	Socorro	LINEAR	·	3.7 km	MPC · JPL
337726	2001 UA_{60}	—	October 17, 2001	Socorro	LINEAR	·	1.5 km	MPC · JPL
337727	2001 UG_{60}	—	October 17, 2001	Socorro	LINEAR	·	4.1 km	MPC · JPL
337728	2001 UF_{61}	—	October 17, 2001	Socorro	LINEAR	·	1.3 km	MPC · JPL
337729	2001 UU_{61}	—	October 17, 2001	Socorro	LINEAR	·	3.4 km	MPC · JPL
337730	2001 UH_{64}	—	October 18, 2001	Socorro	LINEAR	·	1.8 km	MPC · JPL
337731	2001 UZ_{67}	—	October 20, 2001	Socorro	LINEAR	·	2.5 km	MPC · JPL
337732	2001 UH_{68}	—	October 20, 2001	Socorro	LINEAR	PHO	840 m	MPC · JPL
337733	2001 UJ_{68}	—	October 20, 2001	Socorro	LINEAR	NYS	1.1 km	MPC · JPL
337734	2001 UJ_{70}	—	October 17, 2001	Kitt Peak	Spacewatch	·	2.3 km	MPC · JPL
337735	2001 UH_{71}	—	October 17, 2001	Kitt Peak	Spacewatch	V	600 m	MPC · JPL
337736	2001 UR_{72}	—	October 20, 2001	Haleakala	NEAT	T_{j} (2.97)	3.5 km	MPC · JPL
337737	2001 UR_{77}	—	October 17, 2001	Socorro	LINEAR	·	4.7 km	MPC · JPL
337738	2001 UH_{78}	—	October 20, 2001	Socorro	LINEAR	·	1.7 km	MPC · JPL
337739	2001 UF_{80}	—	October 20, 2001	Socorro	LINEAR	·	1.2 km	MPC · JPL
337740	2001 UP_{83}	—	October 20, 2001	Socorro	LINEAR	·	3.9 km	MPC · JPL
337741	2001 UR_{84}	—	October 21, 2001	Socorro	LINEAR	·	2.9 km	MPC · JPL
337742	2001 UF_{87}	—	October 13, 2001	Socorro	LINEAR	CLA	1.8 km	MPC · JPL
337743	2001 UX_{96}	—	October 17, 2001	Socorro	LINEAR	·	1.2 km	MPC · JPL
337744	2001 UR_{97}	—	October 17, 2001	Socorro	LINEAR	·	1.2 km	MPC · JPL
337745	2001 UM_{100}	—	October 17, 2001	Socorro	LINEAR	NYS	1.1 km	MPC · JPL
337746	2001 UX_{100}	—	October 20, 2001	Socorro	LINEAR	·	3.5 km	MPC · JPL
337747	2001 UQ_{101}	—	October 20, 2001	Socorro	LINEAR	THM	2.7 km	MPC · JPL
337748	2001 UY_{101}	—	October 20, 2001	Socorro	LINEAR	·	1.3 km	MPC · JPL
337749	2001 UH_{102}	—	October 20, 2001	Socorro	LINEAR	NYS	1.3 km	MPC · JPL
337750	2001 UT_{105}	—	October 20, 2001	Socorro	LINEAR	MAS	680 m	MPC · JPL
337751	2001 UX_{106}	—	October 20, 2001	Socorro	LINEAR	THM	2.9 km	MPC · JPL
337752	2001 UH_{107}	—	October 20, 2001	Socorro	LINEAR	MAS	710 m	MPC · JPL
337753	2001 UD_{108}	—	October 20, 2001	Socorro	LINEAR	·	3.2 km	MPC · JPL
337754	2001 UR_{108}	—	October 20, 2001	Socorro	LINEAR	·	5.1 km	MPC · JPL
337755	2001 UX_{110}	—	October 21, 2001	Socorro	LINEAR	·	3.6 km	MPC · JPL
337756	2001 UL_{115}	—	October 22, 2001	Socorro	LINEAR	·	2.6 km	MPC · JPL
337757	2001 UA_{120}	—	October 22, 2001	Socorro	LINEAR	·	2.7 km	MPC · JPL
337758	2001 UK_{124}	—	October 22, 2001	Palomar	NEAT	TIR	3.5 km	MPC · JPL
337759	2001 UG_{125}	—	October 22, 2001	Palomar	NEAT	·	3.3 km	MPC · JPL
337760	2001 UJ_{129}	—	October 20, 2001	Socorro	LINEAR	·	1.7 km	MPC · JPL
337761	2001 UB_{130}	—	September 21, 2001	Socorro	LINEAR	L5	9.1 km	MPC · JPL
337762	2001 UJ_{130}	—	October 20, 2001	Socorro	LINEAR	·	3.4 km	MPC · JPL
337763	2001 UM_{137}	—	October 23, 2001	Socorro	LINEAR	·	2.6 km	MPC · JPL
337764	2001 UT_{138}	—	October 23, 2001	Socorro	LINEAR	·	3.4 km	MPC · JPL
337765	2001 UZ_{138}	—	October 23, 2001	Socorro	LINEAR	TIR	3.4 km	MPC · JPL
337766	2001 UZ_{139}	—	October 23, 2001	Socorro	LINEAR	MAS	730 m	MPC · JPL
337767	2001 UV_{143}	—	October 23, 2001	Socorro	LINEAR	EOS	2.2 km	MPC · JPL
337768	2001 UZ_{143}	—	October 23, 2001	Socorro	LINEAR	NYS	1.2 km	MPC · JPL
337769	2001 US_{145}	—	October 23, 2001	Socorro	LINEAR	·	4.2 km	MPC · JPL
337770	2001 UA_{148}	—	October 23, 2001	Socorro	LINEAR	THM	2.5 km	MPC · JPL
337771	2001 UA_{160}	—	October 23, 2001	Socorro	LINEAR	·	1.4 km	MPC · JPL
337772	2001 UK_{163}	—	October 23, 2001	Socorro	LINEAR	NYS	1.2 km	MPC · JPL
337773	2001 UX_{163}	—	October 17, 2001	Palomar	NEAT	·	1.3 km	MPC · JPL
337774	2001 UK_{165}	—	October 23, 2001	Palomar	NEAT	·	2.1 km	MPC · JPL
337775	2001 UK_{166}	—	October 20, 2001	Kitt Peak	Spacewatch	L5	9.0 km	MPC · JPL
337776	2001 UM_{172}	—	October 18, 2001	Palomar	NEAT	·	3.4 km	MPC · JPL
337777	2001 UH_{173}	—	October 18, 2001	Palomar	NEAT	·	3.5 km	MPC · JPL
337778	2001 US_{173}	—	October 18, 2001	Palomar	NEAT	(43176)	3.8 km	MPC · JPL
337779	2001 UO_{177}	—	October 21, 2001	Socorro	LINEAR	·	1.7 km	MPC · JPL
337780	2001 UH_{178}	—	October 23, 2001	Palomar	NEAT	H	830 m	MPC · JPL
337781	2001 UZ_{184}	—	October 16, 2001	Kitt Peak	Spacewatch	·	1.1 km	MPC · JPL
337782	2001 UL_{185}	—	October 17, 2001	Socorro	LINEAR	·	3.8 km	MPC · JPL
337783	2001 UJ_{189}	—	October 18, 2001	Socorro	LINEAR	EUP	4.1 km	MPC · JPL
337784	2001 UB_{192}	—	October 18, 2001	Socorro	LINEAR	T_{j} (2.98)	5.9 km	MPC · JPL
337785	2001 UG_{192}	—	October 18, 2001	Socorro	LINEAR	·	4.8 km	MPC · JPL
337786	2001 UX_{194}	—	October 18, 2001	Palomar	NEAT	V	800 m	MPC · JPL
337787	2001 UU_{195}	—	October 18, 2001	Kitt Peak	Spacewatch	·	3.1 km	MPC · JPL
337788	2001 UE_{198}	—	October 19, 2001	Palomar	NEAT	L5	10 km	MPC · JPL
337789	2001 UE_{201}	—	October 19, 2001	Palomar	NEAT	EOS	2.4 km	MPC · JPL
337790	2001 UU_{201}	—	October 19, 2001	Palomar	NEAT	ARM	4.5 km	MPC · JPL
337791	2001 UU_{202}	—	October 19, 2001	Palomar	NEAT	NYS	1.2 km	MPC · JPL
337792	2001 UV_{202}	—	October 19, 2001	Palomar	NEAT	·	3.5 km	MPC · JPL
337793	2001 UA_{204}	—	October 19, 2001	Palomar	NEAT	·	2.2 km	MPC · JPL
337794	2001 UZ_{204}	—	October 14, 2001	Socorro	LINEAR	·	1.5 km	MPC · JPL
337795	2001 UG_{205}	—	October 19, 2001	Palomar	NEAT	·	1.1 km	MPC · JPL
337796	2001 UW_{205}	—	October 19, 2001	Palomar	NEAT	NYS	1.1 km	MPC · JPL
337797	2001 UU_{207}	—	October 20, 2001	Socorro	LINEAR	·	1.4 km	MPC · JPL
337798	2001 UY_{210}	—	October 21, 2001	Socorro	LINEAR	EOS	2.4 km	MPC · JPL
337799	2001 UC_{211}	—	October 21, 2001	Socorro	LINEAR	·	4.5 km	MPC · JPL
337800	2001 UR_{212}	—	October 21, 2001	Kitt Peak	Spacewatch	·	3.6 km	MPC · JPL

== 337801–337900 ==
back to top

Designation			Discovery			Properties		Ref
Permanent	Provisional	Named after	Date	Site	Discoverer(s)	Category	Diam.	Ref
337801	2001 UG_{213}	—	October 23, 2001	Kitt Peak	Spacewatch	·	1.1 km	MPC · JPL
337802	2001 UD_{214}	—	October 23, 2001	Kitt Peak	Spacewatch	MAS	690 m	MPC · JPL
337803	2001 UD_{216}	—	October 23, 2001	Kitt Peak	Spacewatch	·	1.6 km	MPC · JPL
337804	2001 UN_{216}	—	October 24, 2001	Socorro	LINEAR	L5 · 010	15 km	MPC · JPL
337805	2001 UN_{219}	—	October 16, 2001	Kitt Peak	Spacewatch	THM	2.4 km	MPC · JPL
337806	2001 UV_{222}	—	October 24, 2001	Kitt Peak	Spacewatch	·	3.7 km	MPC · JPL
337807	2001 UU_{224}	—	October 26, 2001	Kitt Peak	Spacewatch	·	3.4 km	MPC · JPL
337808	2001 UK_{226}	—	October 16, 2001	Palomar	NEAT	EOS	2.5 km	MPC · JPL
337809	2001 UG_{227}	—	October 16, 2001	Palomar	NEAT	·	3.1 km	MPC · JPL
337810	2001 UT_{227}	—	October 19, 2001	Palomar	NEAT	NYS	1.1 km	MPC · JPL
337811	2001 UD_{228}	—	October 26, 2001	Palomar	NEAT	NYS	1.4 km	MPC · JPL
337812	2001 UV_{229}	—	October 16, 2001	Palomar	NEAT	NYS	1.1 km	MPC · JPL
337813	2001 UX_{229}	—	October 24, 2001	Palomar	NEAT	EOS	2.1 km	MPC · JPL
337814	2001 VG_{2}	—	November 10, 2001	Emerald Lane	L. Ball	·	2.8 km	MPC · JPL
337815	2001 VZ_{2}	—	November 9, 2001	Kitt Peak	Spacewatch	·	1.6 km	MPC · JPL
337816	2001 VX_{5}	—	November 9, 2001	Socorro	LINEAR	MAS	780 m	MPC · JPL
337817	2001 VL_{6}	—	November 9, 2001	Socorro	LINEAR	·	3.2 km	MPC · JPL
337818	2001 VH_{10}	—	November 10, 2001	Socorro	LINEAR	·	3.4 km	MPC · JPL
337819	2001 VV_{13}	—	November 10, 2001	Socorro	LINEAR	·	4.2 km	MPC · JPL
337820	2001 VA_{18}	—	November 9, 2001	Socorro	LINEAR	·	3.8 km	MPC · JPL
337821	2001 VG_{21}	—	November 9, 2001	Socorro	LINEAR	LIX	4.8 km	MPC · JPL
337822	2001 VR_{23}	—	November 9, 2001	Socorro	LINEAR	·	4.7 km	MPC · JPL
337823	2001 VW_{25}	—	November 9, 2001	Socorro	LINEAR	NYS	1.6 km	MPC · JPL
337824	2001 VG_{28}	—	November 9, 2001	Socorro	LINEAR	V	900 m	MPC · JPL
337825	2001 VV_{28}	—	November 9, 2001	Socorro	LINEAR	·	1.2 km	MPC · JPL
337826	2001 VD_{38}	—	November 9, 2001	Socorro	LINEAR	·	4.7 km	MPC · JPL
337827	2001 VE_{39}	—	November 9, 2001	Socorro	LINEAR	·	5.2 km	MPC · JPL
337828	2001 VQ_{41}	—	November 9, 2001	Socorro	LINEAR	NYS	1.2 km	MPC · JPL
337829	2001 VE_{49}	—	November 9, 2001	Socorro	LINEAR	PHO	2.2 km	MPC · JPL
337830	2001 VF_{53}	—	November 10, 2001	Socorro	LINEAR	·	1.3 km	MPC · JPL
337831	2001 VR_{56}	—	November 10, 2001	Socorro	LINEAR	·	2.2 km	MPC · JPL
337832	2001 VH_{57}	—	September 19, 2001	Socorro	LINEAR	L5	10 km	MPC · JPL
337833	2001 VS_{57}	—	November 10, 2001	Socorro	LINEAR	·	3.2 km	MPC · JPL
337834	2001 VU_{60}	—	November 10, 2001	Socorro	LINEAR	H	590 m	MPC · JPL
337835	2001 VG_{61}	—	November 10, 2001	Socorro	LINEAR	·	4.0 km	MPC · JPL
337836	2001 VE_{69}	—	November 11, 2001	Socorro	LINEAR	EOS	2.8 km	MPC · JPL
337837	2001 VS_{71}	—	November 11, 2001	Ondřejov	P. Kušnirák	·	5.3 km	MPC · JPL
337838	2001 VZ_{72}	—	November 12, 2001	Kitt Peak	Spacewatch	·	3.6 km	MPC · JPL
337839	2001 VQ_{74}	—	November 14, 2001	Kitt Peak	Spacewatch	THM	2.2 km	MPC · JPL
337840	2001 VT_{75}	—	November 15, 2001	Kitt Peak	Spacewatch	MAS	800 m	MPC · JPL
337841	2001 VA_{76}	—	November 12, 2001	Kitt Peak	Spacewatch	·	620 m	MPC · JPL
337842	2001 VH_{80}	—	November 10, 2001	Palomar	NEAT	EUP	4.7 km	MPC · JPL
337843	2001 VE_{81}	—	November 11, 2001	Palomar	NEAT	TIR	5.0 km	MPC · JPL
337844	2001 VA_{84}	—	November 11, 2001	Socorro	LINEAR	·	4.0 km	MPC · JPL
337845	2001 VE_{90}	—	November 15, 2001	Socorro	LINEAR	·	2.0 km	MPC · JPL
337846	2001 VR_{94}	—	November 15, 2001	Socorro	LINEAR	THB	4.5 km	MPC · JPL
337847	2001 VE_{95}	—	November 15, 2001	Socorro	LINEAR	·	3.5 km	MPC · JPL
337848	2001 VZ_{95}	—	November 15, 2001	Socorro	LINEAR	·	6.9 km	MPC · JPL
337849	2001 VH_{101}	—	November 12, 2001	Socorro	LINEAR	·	4.2 km	MPC · JPL
337850	2001 VY_{101}	—	November 12, 2001	Socorro	LINEAR	·	4.4 km	MPC · JPL
337851	2001 VM_{102}	—	November 12, 2001	Socorro	LINEAR	·	4.1 km	MPC · JPL
337852	2001 VF_{104}	—	November 12, 2001	Socorro	LINEAR	LIX	4.0 km	MPC · JPL
337853	2001 VF_{107}	—	November 12, 2001	Socorro	LINEAR	·	1.2 km	MPC · JPL
337854	2001 VZ_{110}	—	November 12, 2001	Socorro	LINEAR	·	1.9 km	MPC · JPL
337855	2001 VC_{114}	—	November 12, 2001	Socorro	LINEAR	·	2.0 km	MPC · JPL
337856	2001 VA_{122}	—	November 13, 2001	Haleakala	NEAT	·	3.0 km	MPC · JPL
337857	2001 VW_{123}	—	November 9, 2001	Palomar	NEAT	NYS	1.2 km	MPC · JPL
337858	2001 VP_{125}	—	November 11, 2001	Kitt Peak	Spacewatch	·	3.3 km	MPC · JPL
337859	2001 VC_{128}	—	November 11, 2001	Apache Point	SDSS	·	3.2 km	MPC · JPL
337860	2001 VY_{128}	—	November 11, 2001	Apache Point	SDSS	L5	16 km	MPC · JPL
337861	2001 VH_{129}	—	November 11, 2001	Apache Point	SDSS	·	1.4 km	MPC · JPL
337862	2001 VG_{130}	—	November 11, 2001	Apache Point	SDSS	T_{j} (2.97)	3.9 km	MPC · JPL
337863	2001 VJ_{132}	—	November 12, 2001	Apache Point	SDSS	L5	9.1 km	MPC · JPL
337864	2001 WT_{2}	—	November 16, 2001	Kitt Peak	Spacewatch	·	2.7 km	MPC · JPL
337865	2001 WT_{10}	—	November 17, 2001	Socorro	LINEAR	·	5.5 km	MPC · JPL
337866	2001 WL_{15}	—	November 23, 2001	Haleakala	NEAT	AMO	620 m	MPC · JPL
337867	2001 WE_{19}	—	November 17, 2001	Socorro	LINEAR	·	3.0 km	MPC · JPL
337868	2001 WM_{26}	—	November 17, 2001	Socorro	LINEAR	·	1.5 km	MPC · JPL
337869	2001 WO_{26}	—	November 17, 2001	Socorro	LINEAR	ERI	1.4 km	MPC · JPL
337870	2001 WG_{35}	—	November 17, 2001	Socorro	LINEAR	VER	3.6 km	MPC · JPL
337871	2001 WA_{42}	—	November 18, 2001	Socorro	LINEAR	HYG	2.7 km	MPC · JPL
337872	2001 WD_{46}	—	November 19, 2001	Socorro	LINEAR	·	1.1 km	MPC · JPL
337873	2001 WL_{51}	—	November 19, 2001	Socorro	LINEAR	·	1.1 km	MPC · JPL
337874	2001 WP_{51}	—	November 19, 2001	Socorro	LINEAR	L5	10 km	MPC · JPL
337875	2001 WJ_{52}	—	November 19, 2001	Socorro	LINEAR	·	3.1 km	MPC · JPL
337876	2001 WB_{53}	—	November 19, 2001	Socorro	LINEAR	L5	9.5 km	MPC · JPL
337877	2001 WV_{60}	—	November 19, 2001	Socorro	LINEAR	URS	3.8 km	MPC · JPL
337878	2001 WY_{60}	—	November 19, 2001	Socorro	LINEAR	·	4.6 km	MPC · JPL
337879	2001 WV_{67}	—	November 20, 2001	Socorro	LINEAR	THM	2.7 km	MPC · JPL
337880	2001 WG_{70}	—	November 20, 2001	Socorro	LINEAR	L5	15 km	MPC · JPL
337881	2001 WS_{71}	—	November 20, 2001	Socorro	LINEAR	·	5.3 km	MPC · JPL
337882	2001 WS_{75}	—	November 20, 2001	Socorro	LINEAR	THM	2.4 km	MPC · JPL
337883	2001 WH_{81}	—	November 20, 2001	Socorro	LINEAR	·	1.6 km	MPC · JPL
337884	2001 WL_{81}	—	November 20, 2001	Socorro	LINEAR	·	1.4 km	MPC · JPL
337885	2001 WF_{93}	—	November 21, 2001	Haleakala	NEAT	·	1.7 km	MPC · JPL
337886	2001 WV_{94}	—	November 20, 2001	Kitt Peak	Spacewatch	·	2.6 km	MPC · JPL
337887	2001 WJ_{97}	—	November 18, 2001	Kitt Peak	Spacewatch	·	1.4 km	MPC · JPL
337888	2001 WP_{97}	—	November 18, 2001	Haleakala	NEAT	·	1.3 km	MPC · JPL
337889	2001 WF_{98}	—	November 19, 2001	Socorro	LINEAR	·	1.0 km	MPC · JPL
337890	2001 WO_{101}	—	November 17, 2001	Kitt Peak	Spacewatch	V	880 m	MPC · JPL
337891	2001 WA_{102}	—	November 18, 2001	Kitt Peak	Spacewatch	MAS	660 m	MPC · JPL
337892	2001 WH_{102}	—	November 19, 2001	Anderson Mesa	LONEOS	NYS	1.3 km	MPC · JPL
337893	2001 XK_{1}	—	December 8, 2001	Socorro	LINEAR	H	1.3 km	MPC · JPL
337894	2001 XU_{6}	—	December 9, 2001	Socorro	LINEAR	PHO	1.4 km	MPC · JPL
337895	2001 XP_{8}	—	December 9, 2001	Socorro	LINEAR	·	1.4 km	MPC · JPL
337896	2001 XH_{35}	—	December 9, 2001	Socorro	LINEAR	·	4.2 km	MPC · JPL
337897	2001 XF_{51}	—	December 10, 2001	Socorro	LINEAR	·	3.8 km	MPC · JPL
337898	2001 XC_{56}	—	December 10, 2001	Socorro	LINEAR	THB	3.6 km	MPC · JPL
337899	2001 XE_{69}	—	December 11, 2001	Socorro	LINEAR	·	4.7 km	MPC · JPL
337900	2001 XP_{69}	—	December 11, 2001	Socorro	LINEAR	·	4.4 km	MPC · JPL

== 337901–338000 ==
back to top

Designation			Discovery			Properties		Ref
Permanent	Provisional	Named after	Date	Site	Discoverer(s)	Category	Diam.	Ref
337901	2001 XQ_{70}	—	December 11, 2001	Socorro	LINEAR	·	4.3 km	MPC · JPL
337902	2001 XV_{70}	—	December 11, 2001	Socorro	LINEAR	·	3.9 km	MPC · JPL
337903	2001 XV_{76}	—	December 11, 2001	Socorro	LINEAR	·	1.4 km	MPC · JPL
337904	2001 XO_{84}	—	December 11, 2001	Socorro	LINEAR	·	1.5 km	MPC · JPL
337905	2001 XP_{89}	—	December 10, 2001	Socorro	LINEAR	·	3.4 km	MPC · JPL
337906	2001 XW_{89}	—	December 10, 2001	Socorro	LINEAR	NYS	960 m	MPC · JPL
337907	2001 XA_{94}	—	November 19, 2001	Socorro	LINEAR	·	1.5 km	MPC · JPL
337908	2001 XH_{94}	—	December 10, 2001	Socorro	LINEAR	HYG	5.1 km	MPC · JPL
337909	2001 XA_{106}	—	December 10, 2001	Socorro	LINEAR	·	1.2 km	MPC · JPL
337910	2001 XA_{111}	—	December 11, 2001	Socorro	LINEAR	·	1.2 km	MPC · JPL
337911	2001 XQ_{123}	—	December 14, 2001	Socorro	LINEAR	NYS	1.2 km	MPC · JPL
337912	2001 XO_{125}	—	December 14, 2001	Socorro	LINEAR	VER	3.5 km	MPC · JPL
337913	2001 XS_{125}	—	December 14, 2001	Socorro	LINEAR	·	1.3 km	MPC · JPL
337914	2001 XW_{128}	—	December 14, 2001	Socorro	LINEAR	THM	2.7 km	MPC · JPL
337915	2001 XA_{133}	—	December 14, 2001	Socorro	LINEAR	NYS	1.2 km	MPC · JPL
337916	2001 XJ_{136}	—	December 14, 2001	Socorro	LINEAR	HYG	3.7 km	MPC · JPL
337917	2001 XP_{136}	—	December 14, 2001	Socorro	LINEAR	·	4.5 km	MPC · JPL
337918	2001 XZ_{167}	—	December 14, 2001	Socorro	LINEAR	NYS	1.3 km	MPC · JPL
337919	2001 XD_{186}	—	December 14, 2001	Socorro	LINEAR	·	1.4 km	MPC · JPL
337920	2001 XW_{210}	—	December 11, 2001	Socorro	LINEAR	·	2.4 km	MPC · JPL
337921	2001 XP_{220}	—	December 15, 2001	Socorro	LINEAR	ERI	1.8 km	MPC · JPL
337922	2001 XK_{225}	—	December 15, 2001	Socorro	LINEAR	·	1.4 km	MPC · JPL
337923	2001 XN_{226}	—	December 15, 2001	Socorro	LINEAR	·	3.1 km	MPC · JPL
337924	2001 XL_{236}	—	December 15, 2001	Socorro	LINEAR	NYS	1.4 km	MPC · JPL
337925	2001 XR_{237}	—	December 15, 2001	Socorro	LINEAR	V	910 m	MPC · JPL
337926	2001 XV_{241}	—	December 14, 2001	Socorro	LINEAR	MAS	640 m	MPC · JPL
337927	2001 XX_{243}	—	December 15, 2001	Socorro	LINEAR	·	6.1 km	MPC · JPL
337928	2001 XQ_{257}	—	December 7, 2001	Palomar	NEAT	·	4.9 km	MPC · JPL
337929	2001 XV_{265}	—	December 15, 2001	Socorro	LINEAR	·	3.1 km	MPC · JPL
337930	2001 YL_{6}	—	December 17, 2001	Goodricke-Pigott	R. A. Tucker	·	1.3 km	MPC · JPL
337931	2001 YD_{7}	—	December 17, 2001	Socorro	LINEAR	LIX	3.7 km	MPC · JPL
337932	2001 YV_{8}	—	December 17, 2001	Socorro	LINEAR	·	1.5 km	MPC · JPL
337933	2001 YD_{14}	—	December 17, 2001	Socorro	LINEAR	·	1.8 km	MPC · JPL
337934	2001 YH_{15}	—	December 17, 2001	Socorro	LINEAR	NYS	1.4 km	MPC · JPL
337935	2001 YY_{21}	—	December 18, 2001	Socorro	LINEAR	·	1.1 km	MPC · JPL
337936	2001 YC_{23}	—	December 18, 2001	Socorro	LINEAR	NYS	1.3 km	MPC · JPL
337937	2001 YK_{23}	—	December 18, 2001	Socorro	LINEAR	MAS	790 m	MPC · JPL
337938	2001 YA_{26}	—	December 18, 2001	Socorro	LINEAR	·	1.8 km	MPC · JPL
337939	2001 YA_{50}	—	December 18, 2001	Socorro	LINEAR	MAS	990 m	MPC · JPL
337940	2001 YX_{50}	—	December 18, 2001	Socorro	LINEAR	ERI	1.6 km	MPC · JPL
337941	2001 YT_{66}	—	December 18, 2001	Socorro	LINEAR	·	1.2 km	MPC · JPL
337942	2001 YH_{69}	—	December 18, 2001	Socorro	LINEAR	·	3.9 km	MPC · JPL
337943	2001 YE_{97}	—	December 17, 2001	Socorro	LINEAR	LIX	4.1 km	MPC · JPL
337944	2001 YH_{102}	—	December 17, 2001	Socorro	LINEAR	·	6.6 km	MPC · JPL
337945	2001 YW_{123}	—	December 17, 2001	Socorro	LINEAR	PHO	1.1 km	MPC · JPL
337946	2001 YE_{130}	—	December 17, 2001	Socorro	LINEAR	·	1.4 km	MPC · JPL
337947	2001 YO_{134}	—	December 18, 2001	Socorro	LINEAR	·	4.3 km	MPC · JPL
337948	2001 YV_{144}	—	December 17, 2001	Socorro	LINEAR	·	1.4 km	MPC · JPL
337949	2001 YA_{155}	—	December 20, 2001	Palomar	NEAT	·	1.1 km	MPC · JPL
337950	2001 YN_{157}	—	December 23, 2001	Kitt Peak	Spacewatch	NYS	1.1 km	MPC · JPL
337951	2002 AV_{30}	—	January 9, 2002	Socorro	LINEAR	·	1.4 km	MPC · JPL
337952	2002 AK_{33}	—	January 6, 2002	Kitt Peak	Spacewatch	·	1.2 km	MPC · JPL
337953	2002 AH_{64}	—	January 11, 2002	Socorro	LINEAR	·	1.5 km	MPC · JPL
337954	2002 AH_{73}	—	January 8, 2002	Socorro	LINEAR	NYS	1.2 km	MPC · JPL
337955	2002 AG_{76}	—	January 8, 2002	Socorro	LINEAR	PHO	1.5 km	MPC · JPL
337956	2002 AD_{78}	—	January 8, 2002	Socorro	LINEAR	·	1.5 km	MPC · JPL
337957	2002 AY_{93}	—	January 8, 2002	Socorro	LINEAR	·	1.8 km	MPC · JPL
337958	2002 AN_{102}	—	January 8, 2002	Socorro	LINEAR	·	1.5 km	MPC · JPL
337959	2002 AK_{105}	—	January 9, 2002	Socorro	LINEAR	EUN	2.7 km	MPC · JPL
337960	2002 AA_{113}	—	January 9, 2002	Socorro	LINEAR	·	1.5 km	MPC · JPL
337961	2002 AP_{132}	—	January 8, 2002	Socorro	LINEAR	MAS	930 m	MPC · JPL
337962	2002 AZ_{156}	—	January 13, 2002	Socorro	LINEAR	·	1.8 km	MPC · JPL
337963	2002 AF_{180}	—	January 9, 2002	Campo Imperatore	CINEOS	MAS	920 m	MPC · JPL
337964	2002 AO_{197}	—	January 14, 2002	Palomar	NEAT	·	3.6 km	MPC · JPL
337965	2002 BZ_{22}	—	January 23, 2002	Socorro	LINEAR	THB	4.0 km	MPC · JPL
337966	2002 CG_{3}	—	February 3, 2002	Palomar	NEAT	·	1.5 km	MPC · JPL
337967	2002 CO_{3}	—	February 6, 2002	Socorro	LINEAR	THB	3.4 km	MPC · JPL
337968	2002 CX_{51}	—	February 12, 2002	Desert Eagle	W. K. Y. Yeung	·	1.5 km	MPC · JPL
337969	2002 CD_{53}	—	February 7, 2002	Socorro	LINEAR	·	1.6 km	MPC · JPL
337970	2002 CA_{63}	—	February 6, 2002	Socorro	LINEAR	·	1.8 km	MPC · JPL
337971	2002 CS_{80}	—	February 7, 2002	Socorro	LINEAR	·	4.2 km	MPC · JPL
337972	2002 CQ_{87}	—	February 7, 2002	Socorro	LINEAR	·	1.3 km	MPC · JPL
337973	2002 CH_{90}	—	February 7, 2002	Socorro	LINEAR	·	1.9 km	MPC · JPL
337974	2002 CC_{104}	—	February 7, 2002	Socorro	LINEAR	·	3.1 km	MPC · JPL
337975	2002 CS_{111}	—	February 7, 2002	Socorro	LINEAR	·	3.7 km	MPC · JPL
337976	2002 CH_{112}	—	February 7, 2002	Socorro	LINEAR	·	2.8 km	MPC · JPL
337977	2002 CG_{124}	—	February 7, 2002	Socorro	LINEAR	·	2.0 km	MPC · JPL
337978	2002 CM_{126}	—	February 7, 2002	Socorro	LINEAR	·	1.5 km	MPC · JPL
337979	2002 CM_{144}	—	February 9, 2002	Socorro	LINEAR	·	1.9 km	MPC · JPL
337980	2002 CJ_{145}	—	January 13, 2002	Socorro	LINEAR	·	2.5 km	MPC · JPL
337981	2002 CV_{166}	—	February 8, 2002	Socorro	LINEAR	·	1.3 km	MPC · JPL
337982	2002 CE_{182}	—	February 10, 2002	Socorro	LINEAR	·	1.5 km	MPC · JPL
337983	2002 CH_{189}	—	February 10, 2002	Socorro	LINEAR	·	1.4 km	MPC · JPL
337984	2002 CY_{195}	—	February 10, 2002	Socorro	LINEAR	·	1.2 km	MPC · JPL
337985	2002 CG_{200}	—	February 10, 2002	Socorro	LINEAR	·	1.3 km	MPC · JPL
337986	2002 CU_{201}	—	February 10, 2002	Socorro	LINEAR	·	1.8 km	MPC · JPL
337987	2002 CL_{220}	—	February 10, 2002	Socorro	LINEAR	·	1.3 km	MPC · JPL
337988	2002 CF_{221}	—	February 10, 2002	Socorro	LINEAR	·	1.6 km	MPC · JPL
337989	2002 CT_{241}	—	February 11, 2002	Socorro	LINEAR	(5)	1.3 km	MPC · JPL
337990	2002 CR_{253}	—	February 4, 2002	Palomar	NEAT	·	1.5 km	MPC · JPL
337991	2002 CB_{284}	—	February 9, 2002	Kitt Peak	Spacewatch	MAS	600 m	MPC · JPL
337992	2002 CJ_{294}	—	February 10, 2002	Socorro	LINEAR	·	2.6 km	MPC · JPL
337993	2002 DU_{10}	—	February 19, 2002	Socorro	LINEAR	T_{j} (2.96)	4.7 km	MPC · JPL
337994	2002 DC_{18}	—	February 20, 2002	Socorro	LINEAR	EUN	2.1 km	MPC · JPL
337995	2002 DZ_{18}	—	February 22, 2002	Palomar	NEAT	·	1.7 km	MPC · JPL
337996	2002 EE_{11}	—	March 14, 2002	Desert Eagle	W. K. Y. Yeung	JUN	1.4 km	MPC · JPL
337997	2002 EO_{19}	—	March 9, 2002	Palomar	NEAT	L4	10 km	MPC · JPL
337998	2002 ER_{19}	—	March 10, 2002	Haleakala	NEAT	·	1.4 km	MPC · JPL
337999	2002 EO_{22}	—	March 10, 2002	Haleakala	NEAT	·	1.5 km	MPC · JPL
338000	2002 EK_{27}	—	March 9, 2002	Socorro	LINEAR	·	2.0 km	MPC · JPL

back to top

== See also ==
- Meanings of minor-planet names: 337001–338000
