= Meanings of minor-planet names: 337001–338000 =

As minor planet discoveries are confirmed, they are given a permanent number by the IAU's Minor Planet Center (MPC), and the discoverers can then submit names for them, following the IAU's naming conventions. The list below concerns those minor planets in the specified number-range that have received names, and explains the meanings of those names.

Official naming citations of newly named small Solar System bodies are approved and published in a bulletin by IAU's Working Group for Small Bodies Nomenclature (WGSBN). Before May 2021, citations were published in MPC's Minor Planet Circulars for many decades. Recent citations can also be found on the JPL Small-Body Database (SBDB). Until his death in 2016, German astronomer Lutz D. Schmadel compiled these citations into the Dictionary of Minor Planet Names (DMP) and regularly updated the collection.

Based on Paul Herget's The Names of the Minor Planets, Schmadel also researched the unclear origin of numerous asteroids, most of which had been named prior to World War II. This article incorporates text from this source, which is in the public domain: SBDB New namings may only be added to this list below after official publication as the preannouncement of names is condemned. The WGSBN publishes a comprehensive guideline for the naming rules of non-cometary small Solar System bodies.

== 337001–337100 ==
| Named minor planet | Provisional | This minor planet was named for... | Ref · Catalog |
|---|---|---|---|
| 337002 Robertbodzon | 2012 OB | Robert Bodzon (1969–2012), Polish popularizer of astronomy | JPL · 337002 |
| 337044 Bobdylan | 1996 DB_{5} | Bob Dylan (Robert Allen Zimmerman, born 1941), a singer and songwriter, has influenced popular music and culture for more than five decades | JPL · 337044 |

== 337101–337200 ==
back to top

| Named minor planet | Provisional | This minor planet was named for... | Ref · Catalog |
|---|---|---|---|
| 337166 Ivanartioukhov | 1999 VM_{1} | Ivan Semenovich Artioukhov (1908–1995), founder of the society for nature conservation in Russia and father-in-law of Russian co-discoverer Sergei I. Ipatov | JPL · 337166 |

== 337201–337300 ==
back to top

| Named minor planet | Provisional | This minor planet was named for... | Ref · Catalog |
|---|---|---|---|
There are no named minor planets in this number range

== 337301–337400 ==
back to top

| Named minor planet | Provisional | This minor planet was named for... | Ref · Catalog |
|---|---|---|---|
| 337380 Lenormand | 2001 QS_{85} | Louis-Sébastien Lenormand (1757–1837), a French chemist, physicist and inventor who coined the term parachute and was the first man to make a witnessed descent with one | JPL · 337380 |

== 337401–337500 ==
back to top

| Named minor planet | Provisional | This minor planet was named for... | Ref · Catalog |
|---|---|---|---|
There are no named minor planets in this number range

== 337501–337600 ==
back to top

| Named minor planet | Provisional | This minor planet was named for... | Ref · Catalog |
|---|---|---|---|
There are no named minor planets in this number range

== 337601–337700 ==
back to top

| Named minor planet | Provisional | This minor planet was named for... | Ref · Catalog |
|---|---|---|---|
| 337700 Korpás | 2001 TQ_{258} | Gabriel Korpás (born 1958), a Slovak amateur astronomer and popularizer of astronomy, as well as a member of the astronomy club in Nové Zámky. | IAU · 337700 |

== 337701–337800 ==
back to top

| Named minor planet | Provisional | This minor planet was named for... | Ref · Catalog |
|---|---|---|---|
There are no named minor planets in this number range

== 337801–337900 ==
back to top

| Named minor planet | Provisional | This minor planet was named for... | Ref · Catalog |
|---|---|---|---|
There are no named minor planets in this number range

== 337901–338000 ==
back to top

| Named minor planet | Provisional | This minor planet was named for... | Ref · Catalog |
|---|---|---|---|
There are no named minor planets in this number range

back to top

| Preceded by 336,001–337,000 | Meanings of minor-planet names List of minor planets: 337,001–338,000 | Succeeded by 338,001–339,000 |
