= List of minor planets: 872001–873000 =

The following is a partial list of minor planets, running from minor-planet number 872001 through 873000, inclusive. The primary data for this and other partial lists is based on JPL's "Small-Body Orbital Elements" and data available from the Minor Planet Center. Critical list information is also provided by the MPC, unless otherwise specified from Lowell Observatory. A detailed description of the table's columns and additional sources are given on the main page including a complete list of every page in this series, and a statistical break-up on the dynamical classification of minor planets.

Also see the summary list of all named bodies in numerical and alphabetical order, and the corresponding naming citations for the number range of this particular list. New namings may only be added to this list after official publication, as the preannouncement of names is condemned by the Working Group for Small Bodies Nomenclature of the International Astronomical Union.

| Near-Earth obj. | MBA (inner) | MBA (outer) | Centaur |
| Mars-crosser | MBA (middle) | Jupiter trojan | Trans-Neptunian obj. |
| Unclassified |

== 872001–872100 ==
| Designation | | | Discovery | | | Properties | | Ref |
| Permanent | Provisional | Named after | Date | Site | Discoverer(s) | Category | Diam. | Ref |
|---|---|---|---|---|---|---|---|---|
| 872001 | 2017 XR_{44} | — | September 19, 2011 | Haleakala | Pan-STARRS 1 | · | 1.7 km | MPC · JPL |
| 872002 | 2017 XW_{47} | — | January 1, 2014 | Haleakala | Pan-STARRS 1 | · | 1.1 km | MPC · JPL |
| 872003 | 2017 XQ_{49} | — | February 16, 2015 | Haleakala | Pan-STARRS 1 | (5) | 910 m | MPC · JPL |
| 872004 | 2017 XF_{52} | — | October 21, 2017 | Mount Lemmon | Mount Lemmon Survey | (5) | 650 m | MPC · JPL |
| 872005 | 2017 XS_{52} | — | November 3, 2005 | Kitt Peak | Spacewatch | · | 940 m | MPC · JPL |
| 872006 | 2017 XC_{53} | — | October 7, 2004 | Kitt Peak | Spacewatch | · | 990 m | MPC · JPL |
| 872007 | 2017 XE_{53} | — | April 18, 2015 | Cerro Tololo | DECam | · | 1.2 km | MPC · JPL |
| 872008 | 2017 XK_{53} | — | December 8, 2017 | Haleakala | Pan-STARRS 1 | · | 880 m | MPC · JPL |
| 872009 | 2017 XF_{55} | — | October 27, 2017 | Mount Lemmon | Mount Lemmon Survey | (5) | 920 m | MPC · JPL |
| 872010 | 2017 XE_{56} | — | November 17, 2009 | Kitt Peak | Spacewatch | H | 360 m | MPC · JPL |
| 872011 | 2017 XA_{59} | — | February 17, 2015 | Haleakala | Pan-STARRS 1 | · | 1.3 km | MPC · JPL |
| 872012 | 2017 XX_{59} | — | October 6, 2008 | Mount Lemmon | Mount Lemmon Survey | · | 860 m | MPC · JPL |
| 872013 | 2017 XH_{60} | — | January 1, 2009 | Kitt Peak | Spacewatch | · | 1.3 km | MPC · JPL |
| 872014 | 2017 XP_{62} | — | January 26, 2014 | Haleakala | Pan-STARRS 1 | JUN | 630 m | MPC · JPL |
| 872015 | 2017 XA_{63} | — | December 22, 2003 | Kitt Peak | Spacewatch | · | 560 m | MPC · JPL |
| 872016 | 2017 XH_{64} | — | December 12, 2017 | Haleakala | Pan-STARRS 1 | · | 1.2 km | MPC · JPL |
| 872017 | 2017 XM_{65} | — | December 12, 2017 | Haleakala | Pan-STARRS 1 | · | 1.2 km | MPC · JPL |
| 872018 | 2017 XQ_{65} | — | December 13, 2017 | Mount Lemmon | Mount Lemmon Survey | · | 1.1 km | MPC · JPL |
| 872019 | 2017 XM_{66} | — | December 12, 2017 | Haleakala | Pan-STARRS 1 | PHO | 670 m | MPC · JPL |
| 872020 | 2017 XH_{67} | — | December 12, 2017 | Haleakala | Pan-STARRS 1 | · | 460 m | MPC · JPL |
| 872021 | 2017 XX_{68} | — | August 9, 2004 | Siding Spring | SSS | · | 1.2 km | MPC · JPL |
| 872022 | 2017 XM_{69} | — | December 19, 2009 | Mount Lemmon | Mount Lemmon Survey | H | 460 m | MPC · JPL |
| 872023 | 2017 XX_{69} | — | December 8, 2017 | Haleakala | Pan-STARRS 1 | EUN | 730 m | MPC · JPL |
| 872024 | 2017 XQ_{70} | — | December 13, 2017 | Haleakala | Pan-STARRS 1 | · | 1.5 km | MPC · JPL |
| 872025 | 2017 XR_{70} | — | December 15, 2017 | Mount Lemmon | Mount Lemmon Survey | (194) | 1.1 km | MPC · JPL |
| 872026 | 2017 XS_{71} | — | December 13, 2017 | Mount Lemmon | Mount Lemmon Survey | · | 920 m | MPC · JPL |
| 872027 | 2017 XW_{71} | — | December 8, 2017 | Haleakala | Pan-STARRS 1 | · | 1.4 km | MPC · JPL |
| 872028 | 2017 XB_{72} | — | December 12, 2017 | Haleakala | Pan-STARRS 1 | JUN | 790 m | MPC · JPL |
| 872029 | 2017 XG_{73} | — | December 14, 2017 | Mount Lemmon | Mount Lemmon Survey | · | 1.3 km | MPC · JPL |
| 872030 | 2017 XO_{73} | — | December 15, 2017 | Mount Lemmon | Mount Lemmon Survey | · | 580 m | MPC · JPL |
| 872031 | 2017 XH_{74} | — | December 8, 2017 | Haleakala | Pan-STARRS 1 | · | 870 m | MPC · JPL |
| 872032 | 2017 XO_{74} | — | December 12, 2017 | Haleakala | Pan-STARRS 1 | GEF | 870 m | MPC · JPL |
| 872033 | 2017 XN_{75} | — | December 15, 2017 | Mount Lemmon | Mount Lemmon Survey | · | 990 m | MPC · JPL |
| 872034 | 2017 XZ_{75} | — | December 12, 2017 | Haleakala | Pan-STARRS 1 | · | 450 m | MPC · JPL |
| 872035 | 2017 XD_{78} | — | December 13, 2017 | Haleakala | Pan-STARRS 1 | EUN | 710 m | MPC · JPL |
| 872036 | 2017 XV_{78} | — | May 21, 2015 | Cerro Tololo | DECam | · | 1.1 km | MPC · JPL |
| 872037 | 2017 XL_{79} | — | December 12, 2017 | Haleakala | Pan-STARRS 1 | · | 740 m | MPC · JPL |
| 872038 | 2017 XD_{80} | — | December 6, 2012 | Mount Lemmon | Mount Lemmon Survey | · | 1.7 km | MPC · JPL |
| 872039 | 2017 XV_{81} | — | December 9, 2017 | Mount Lemmon | Mount Lemmon Survey | · | 1.2 km | MPC · JPL |
| 872040 | 2017 XG_{82} | — | November 28, 2017 | Mount Lemmon | Mount Lemmon Survey | · | 1.2 km | MPC · JPL |
| 872041 | 2017 XH_{82} | — | December 8, 2017 | Haleakala | Pan-STARRS 1 | · | 1.3 km | MPC · JPL |
| 872042 | 2017 XB_{84} | — | December 14, 2017 | Mount Lemmon | Mount Lemmon Survey | · | 990 m | MPC · JPL |
| 872043 | 2017 XO_{84} | — | December 12, 2017 | Haleakala | Pan-STARRS 1 | · | 1.2 km | MPC · JPL |
| 872044 | 2017 XH_{85} | — | December 15, 2017 | Mount Lemmon | Mount Lemmon Survey | H | 370 m | MPC · JPL |
| 872045 | 2017 XR_{85} | — | December 15, 2017 | Mount Lemmon | Mount Lemmon Survey | · | 950 m | MPC · JPL |
| 872046 | 2017 XE_{87} | — | December 12, 2017 | Haleakala | Pan-STARRS 1 | · | 980 m | MPC · JPL |
| 872047 | 2017 XX_{89} | — | August 26, 2016 | Haleakala | Pan-STARRS 1 | · | 1.2 km | MPC · JPL |
| 872048 | 2017 XQ_{90} | — | July 29, 2000 | Cerro Tololo | Deep Ecliptic Survey | MAR | 880 m | MPC · JPL |
| 872049 | 2017 XL_{93} | — | December 12, 2017 | Haleakala | Pan-STARRS 1 | · | 2.2 km | MPC · JPL |
| 872050 | 2017 XQ_{93} | — | December 15, 2017 | Mount Lemmon | Mount Lemmon Survey | · | 2.0 km | MPC · JPL |
| 872051 | 2017 XX_{97} | — | December 13, 2017 | Haleakala | Pan-STARRS 1 | (159) | 1.8 km | MPC · JPL |
| 872052 | 2017 YJ | — | April 27, 2011 | Mount Lemmon | Mount Lemmon Survey | H | 360 m | MPC · JPL |
| 872053 | 2017 YR | — | November 22, 2006 | Kitt Peak | Spacewatch | · | 2.8 km | MPC · JPL |
| 872054 | 2017 YE_{2} | — | January 27, 2000 | Socorro | LINEAR | · | 1.6 km | MPC · JPL |
| 872055 | 2017 YS_{5} | — | December 25, 2017 | Haleakala | Pan-STARRS 1 | H | 330 m | MPC · JPL |
| 872056 | 2017 YE_{6} | — | November 28, 2014 | Haleakala | Pan-STARRS 1 | H | 450 m | MPC · JPL |
| 872057 | 2017 YY_{6} | — | August 3, 2016 | Haleakala | Pan-STARRS 1 | · | 1.4 km | MPC · JPL |
| 872058 | 2017 YZ_{7} | — | September 6, 2008 | Mount Lemmon | Mount Lemmon Survey | · | 1.3 km | MPC · JPL |
| 872059 | 2017 YD_{9} | — | November 14, 2017 | Mount Lemmon | Mount Lemmon Survey | · | 840 m | MPC · JPL |
| 872060 | 2017 YX_{10} | — | October 21, 2012 | Kitt Peak | Spacewatch | · | 1.2 km | MPC · JPL |
| 872061 | 2017 YD_{12} | — | December 24, 2017 | Haleakala | Pan-STARRS 1 | H | 340 m | MPC · JPL |
| 872062 | 2017 YY_{12} | — | November 12, 2006 | Mount Lemmon | Mount Lemmon Survey | · | 1.7 km | MPC · JPL |
| 872063 | 2017 YF_{13} | — | October 29, 2017 | Haleakala | Pan-STARRS 1 | · | 870 m | MPC · JPL |
| 872064 | 2017 YN_{13} | — | November 23, 2008 | Črni Vrh | Mikuž, H. | · | 1.9 km | MPC · JPL |
| 872065 | 2017 YD_{16} | — | November 15, 2017 | Mount Lemmon | Mount Lemmon Survey | · | 1.5 km | MPC · JPL |
| 872066 | 2017 YF_{16} | — | May 23, 2014 | Haleakala | Pan-STARRS 1 | · | 1.3 km | MPC · JPL |
| 872067 | 2017 YE_{17} | — | December 27, 2017 | Mount Lemmon | Mount Lemmon Survey | · | 1.7 km | MPC · JPL |
| 872068 | 2017 YD_{19} | — | December 29, 2017 | Haleakala | Pan-STARRS 1 | · | 790 m | MPC · JPL |
| 872069 | 2017 YD_{20} | — | December 23, 2017 | Haleakala | Pan-STARRS 1 | · | 1.2 km | MPC · JPL |
| 872070 | 2017 YP_{20} | — | February 24, 2014 | Haleakala | Pan-STARRS 1 | EUN | 880 m | MPC · JPL |
| 872071 | 2017 YC_{24} | — | December 16, 2017 | Mount Lemmon | Mount Lemmon Survey | · | 430 m | MPC · JPL |
| 872072 | 2017 YC_{25} | — | January 16, 2009 | Mount Lemmon | Mount Lemmon Survey | · | 1.2 km | MPC · JPL |
| 872073 | 2017 YV_{25} | — | December 23, 2017 | Haleakala | Pan-STARRS 1 | · | 1.1 km | MPC · JPL |
| 872074 | 2017 YA_{26} | — | December 25, 2017 | Haleakala | Pan-STARRS 1 | EUN | 840 m | MPC · JPL |
| 872075 | 2017 YB_{29} | — | November 2, 2011 | Mount Lemmon | Mount Lemmon Survey | LIX | 1.7 km | MPC · JPL |
| 872076 | 2017 YF_{29} | — | December 23, 2017 | Haleakala | Pan-STARRS 1 | · | 1.4 km | MPC · JPL |
| 872077 | 2017 YO_{29} | — | December 16, 2017 | Mount Lemmon | Mount Lemmon Survey | PHO | 760 m | MPC · JPL |
| 872078 | 2017 YV_{30} | — | December 23, 2017 | Haleakala | Pan-STARRS 1 | · | 940 m | MPC · JPL |
| 872079 | 2017 YM_{31} | — | December 24, 2017 | Haleakala | Pan-STARRS 1 | · | 470 m | MPC · JPL |
| 872080 | 2017 YW_{31} | — | December 25, 2017 | Mount Lemmon | Mount Lemmon Survey | · | 1.2 km | MPC · JPL |
| 872081 | 2017 YD_{32} | — | December 25, 2017 | Haleakala | Pan-STARRS 1 | · | 760 m | MPC · JPL |
| 872082 | 2017 YJ_{32} | — | December 23, 2017 | Haleakala | Pan-STARRS 1 | · | 1.3 km | MPC · JPL |
| 872083 | 2017 YY_{32} | — | December 23, 2017 | Haleakala | Pan-STARRS 1 | · | 400 m | MPC · JPL |
| 872084 | 2017 YG_{33} | — | December 23, 2017 | Haleakala | Pan-STARRS 1 | · | 740 m | MPC · JPL |
| 872085 | 2017 YP_{33} | — | December 23, 2017 | Haleakala | Pan-STARRS 1 | · | 790 m | MPC · JPL |
| 872086 | 2017 YZ_{33} | — | December 25, 2017 | Mount Lemmon | Mount Lemmon Survey | ERI | 900 m | MPC · JPL |
| 872087 | 2017 YV_{34} | — | December 26, 2017 | Mount Lemmon | Mount Lemmon Survey | (2076) | 500 m | MPC · JPL |
| 872088 | 2017 YJ_{35} | — | April 18, 2015 | Mount Lemmon | Mount Lemmon Survey | V | 400 m | MPC · JPL |
| 872089 | 2017 YO_{35} | — | December 23, 2017 | Haleakala | Pan-STARRS 1 | · | 450 m | MPC · JPL |
| 872090 | 2017 YR_{35} | — | December 25, 2017 | Haleakala | Pan-STARRS 1 | EUN | 830 m | MPC · JPL |
| 872091 | 2017 YM_{36} | — | December 26, 2017 | Mount Lemmon | Mount Lemmon Survey | · | 510 m | MPC · JPL |
| 872092 | 2017 YE_{37} | — | May 20, 2015 | Cerro Tololo | DECam | · | 730 m | MPC · JPL |
| 872093 | 2017 YZ_{37} | — | December 24, 2017 | Haleakala | Pan-STARRS 1 | · | 820 m | MPC · JPL |
| 872094 | 2017 YD_{38} | — | December 26, 2017 | Mount Lemmon | Mount Lemmon Survey | EUN | 930 m | MPC · JPL |
| 872095 | 2017 YJ_{38} | — | December 23, 2017 | Haleakala | Pan-STARRS 1 | · | 1.4 km | MPC · JPL |
| 872096 | 2017 YJ_{39} | — | December 26, 2017 | Haleakala | Pan-STARRS 1 | H | 340 m | MPC · JPL |
| 872097 | 2017 YP_{39} | — | December 26, 2017 | Mount Lemmon | Mount Lemmon Survey | · | 920 m | MPC · JPL |
| 872098 | 2017 YC_{40} | — | December 23, 2017 | Haleakala | Pan-STARRS 1 | · | 1.3 km | MPC · JPL |
| 872099 | 2017 YF_{40} | — | December 23, 2017 | Haleakala | Pan-STARRS 1 | · | 1.4 km | MPC · JPL |
| 872100 | 2017 YG_{40} | — | March 11, 2005 | Kitt Peak | Deep Ecliptic Survey | · | 1.1 km | MPC · JPL |

== 872101–872200 ==
back to top

| Designation | | | Discovery | | | Properties | | Ref |
| Permanent | Provisional | Named after | Date | Site | Discoverer(s) | Category | Diam. | Ref |
|---|---|---|---|---|---|---|---|---|
| 872101 | 2017 YG_{41} | — | December 25, 2017 | Haleakala | Pan-STARRS 1 | · | 960 m | MPC · JPL |
| 872102 | 2017 YW_{41} | — | December 23, 2017 | Haleakala | Pan-STARRS 1 | NYS | 900 m | MPC · JPL |
| 872103 | 2017 YL_{42} | — | December 29, 2017 | Haleakala | Pan-STARRS 1 | · | 1.6 km | MPC · JPL |
| 872104 | 2017 YU_{42} | — | December 29, 2017 | Haleakala | Pan-STARRS 1 | MAS | 510 m | MPC · JPL |
| 872105 | 2017 YW_{42} | — | December 29, 2017 | Haleakala | Pan-STARRS 1 | · | 440 m | MPC · JPL |
| 872106 | 2017 YK_{43} | — | December 23, 2017 | Haleakala | Pan-STARRS 1 | THB | 2.1 km | MPC · JPL |
| 872107 | 2017 YA_{46} | — | December 19, 2017 | Mount Lemmon | Mount Lemmon Survey | EUN | 960 m | MPC · JPL |
| 872108 | 2017 YZ_{46} | — | December 16, 2017 | Mount Lemmon | Mount Lemmon Survey | · | 1.3 km | MPC · JPL |
| 872109 | 2017 YY_{48} | — | December 26, 2017 | Haleakala | Pan-STARRS 1 | · | 1.2 km | MPC · JPL |
| 872110 | 2017 YD_{50} | — | May 20, 2015 | Cerro Tololo | DECam | ADE | 1.3 km | MPC · JPL |
| 872111 | 2017 YU_{51} | — | December 20, 2017 | Mount Lemmon | Mount Lemmon Survey | · | 1.1 km | MPC · JPL |
| 872112 | 2017 YM_{52} | — | August 28, 2016 | Mount Lemmon | Mount Lemmon Survey | · | 1.2 km | MPC · JPL |
| 872113 | 2017 YQ_{52} | — | December 23, 2017 | Haleakala | Pan-STARRS 1 | · | 1.0 km | MPC · JPL |
| 872114 | 2017 YG_{53} | — | December 26, 2017 | Mount Lemmon | Mount Lemmon Survey | · | 1.5 km | MPC · JPL |
| 872115 | 2017 YX_{53} | — | December 24, 2017 | Haleakala | Pan-STARRS 1 | · | 1.3 km | MPC · JPL |
| 872116 | 2017 YW_{60} | — | March 22, 2014 | Mount Lemmon | Mount Lemmon Survey | · | 1.5 km | MPC · JPL |
| 872117 | 2017 YD_{61} | — | October 17, 2012 | Haleakala | Pan-STARRS 1 | · | 800 m | MPC · JPL |
| 872118 | 2017 YS_{62} | — | December 23, 2017 | Haleakala | Pan-STARRS 1 | · | 1.2 km | MPC · JPL |
| 872119 | 2017 YZ_{62} | — | December 28, 2017 | Mount Lemmon | Mount Lemmon Survey | T_{j} (2.96) | 1.7 km | MPC · JPL |
| 872120 | 2017 YQ_{70} | — | December 25, 2017 | Haleakala | Pan-STARRS 1 | · | 460 m | MPC · JPL |
| 872121 | 2017 YV_{79} | — | December 25, 2017 | Mount Lemmon | Mount Lemmon Survey | · | 1.1 km | MPC · JPL |
| 872122 | 2018 AK | — | March 5, 2013 | Haleakala | Pan-STARRS 1 | H | 440 m | MPC · JPL |
| 872123 | 2018 AV_{1} | — | December 14, 2017 | Haleakala | Pan-STARRS 1 | H | 400 m | MPC · JPL |
| 872124 | 2018 AC_{2} | — | October 29, 2017 | Mount Lemmon | Mount Lemmon Survey | H | 500 m | MPC · JPL |
| 872125 | 2018 AU_{4} | — | October 6, 2008 | Mount Lemmon | Mount Lemmon Survey | · | 2.0 km | MPC · JPL |
| 872126 | 2018 AR_{10} | — | March 7, 2014 | Oukaïmeden | C. Rinner | JUN | 780 m | MPC · JPL |
| 872127 | 2018 AT_{10} | — | January 11, 2018 | Haleakala | Pan-STARRS 1 | · | 600 m | MPC · JPL |
| 872128 | 2018 AW_{10} | — | November 20, 2017 | Haleakala | Pan-STARRS 1 | HNS | 1.0 km | MPC · JPL |
| 872129 | 2018 AD_{11} | — | December 12, 2017 | Haleakala | Pan-STARRS 1 | · | 740 m | MPC · JPL |
| 872130 | 2018 AC_{13} | — | February 16, 2001 | Socorro | LINEAR | · | 1.3 km | MPC · JPL |
| 872131 | 2018 AK_{15} | — | February 26, 2014 | Mount Lemmon | Mount Lemmon Survey | · | 1.1 km | MPC · JPL |
| 872132 | 2018 AL_{16} | — | December 25, 2017 | Mount Lemmon | Mount Lemmon Survey | PHO | 580 m | MPC · JPL |
| 872133 | 2018 AO_{16} | — | June 24, 2014 | Haleakala | Pan-STARRS 1 | H | 470 m | MPC · JPL |
| 872134 | 2018 AR_{17} | — | October 6, 2008 | Mount Lemmon | Mount Lemmon Survey | JUN | 590 m | MPC · JPL |
| 872135 | 2018 AE_{19} | — | January 15, 2018 | Haleakala | Pan-STARRS 1 | · | 2.4 km | MPC · JPL |
| 872136 | 2018 AM_{20} | — | January 14, 2018 | Mount Lemmon | Mount Lemmon Survey | MAS | 560 m | MPC · JPL |
| 872137 | 2018 AP_{21} | — | January 15, 2018 | Haleakala | Pan-STARRS 1 | · | 1.6 km | MPC · JPL |
| 872138 | 2018 AG_{22} | — | January 12, 2018 | Mount Lemmon | Mount Lemmon Survey | · | 2.8 km | MPC · JPL |
| 872139 | 2018 AZ_{24} | — | January 15, 2018 | Mount Lemmon | Mount Lemmon Survey | · | 1.8 km | MPC · JPL |
| 872140 | 2018 AW_{25} | — | October 10, 2016 | Haleakala | Pan-STARRS 1 | · | 1.5 km | MPC · JPL |
| 872141 | 2018 AV_{27} | — | January 15, 2018 | Haleakala | Pan-STARRS 1 | · | 450 m | MPC · JPL |
| 872142 | 2018 AU_{29} | — | May 23, 2014 | Haleakala | Pan-STARRS 1 | · | 1.5 km | MPC · JPL |
| 872143 | 2018 AD_{30} | — | January 15, 2018 | Haleakala | Pan-STARRS 1 | PHO | 660 m | MPC · JPL |
| 872144 | 2018 AO_{30} | — | January 13, 2018 | Mount Lemmon | Mount Lemmon Survey | · | 900 m | MPC · JPL |
| 872145 | 2018 AQ_{30} | — | January 12, 2018 | Mount Lemmon | Mount Lemmon Survey | · | 820 m | MPC · JPL |
| 872146 | 2018 AQ_{31} | — | January 12, 2018 | Mount Lemmon | Mount Lemmon Survey | HOF | 1.9 km | MPC · JPL |
| 872147 | 2018 AB_{32} | — | January 15, 2018 | Haleakala | Pan-STARRS 1 | · | 900 m | MPC · JPL |
| 872148 | 2018 AG_{32} | — | April 18, 2015 | Cerro Tololo | DECam | · | 590 m | MPC · JPL |
| 872149 | 2018 AY_{32} | — | January 14, 2018 | Haleakala | Pan-STARRS 1 | · | 1.4 km | MPC · JPL |
| 872150 | 2018 AW_{33} | — | January 15, 2018 | Haleakala | Pan-STARRS 1 | · | 890 m | MPC · JPL |
| 872151 | 2018 AA_{34} | — | January 12, 2018 | Haleakala | Pan-STARRS 1 | · | 810 m | MPC · JPL |
| 872152 | 2018 AE_{34} | — | April 23, 2014 | Cerro Tololo | DECam | · | 1.2 km | MPC · JPL |
| 872153 | 2018 AM_{34} | — | March 29, 2015 | Haleakala | Pan-STARRS 1 | · | 450 m | MPC · JPL |
| 872154 | 2018 AU_{34} | — | January 12, 2018 | Haleakala | Pan-STARRS 1 | KON | 1.8 km | MPC · JPL |
| 872155 | 2018 AP_{36} | — | January 12, 2018 | Haleakala | Pan-STARRS 1 | · | 980 m | MPC · JPL |
| 872156 | 2018 AE_{39} | — | January 15, 2018 | Haleakala | Pan-STARRS 1 | · | 940 m | MPC · JPL |
| 872157 | 2018 AP_{43} | — | January 12, 2018 | Mount Lemmon | Mount Lemmon Survey | · | 1.1 km | MPC · JPL |
| 872158 | 2018 AU_{43} | — | April 18, 2015 | Cerro Tololo | DECam | · | 650 m | MPC · JPL |
| 872159 | 2018 AY_{43} | — | January 8, 2018 | Mount Lemmon | Mount Lemmon Survey | EUP | 2.3 km | MPC · JPL |
| 872160 | 2018 AJ_{44} | — | January 10, 2018 | Haleakala | Pan-STARRS 1 | · | 1.0 km | MPC · JPL |
| 872161 | 2018 AC_{45} | — | January 13, 2018 | Mount Lemmon | Mount Lemmon Survey | PHO | 820 m | MPC · JPL |
| 872162 | 2018 AD_{45} | — | January 14, 2018 | Mount Lemmon | Mount Lemmon Survey | DOR | 1.8 km | MPC · JPL |
| 872163 | 2018 AL_{45} | — | January 15, 2018 | Haleakala | Pan-STARRS 1 | · | 1.2 km | MPC · JPL |
| 872164 | 2018 AA_{47} | — | January 6, 2018 | Haleakala | Pan-STARRS 1 | · | 1.7 km | MPC · JPL |
| 872165 | 2018 AE_{47} | — | January 13, 2018 | Mount Lemmon | Mount Lemmon Survey | HOF | 1.8 km | MPC · JPL |
| 872166 | 2018 AL_{47} | — | January 12, 2018 | Haleakala | Pan-STARRS 1 | EOS | 1.2 km | MPC · JPL |
| 872167 | 2018 AU_{49} | — | January 13, 2018 | Haleakala | Pan-STARRS 1 | H | 330 m | MPC · JPL |
| 872168 | 2018 AK_{50} | — | August 10, 2012 | Kitt Peak | Spacewatch | · | 910 m | MPC · JPL |
| 872169 | 2018 AO_{51} | — | January 12, 2018 | Haleakala | Pan-STARRS 1 | · | 1.5 km | MPC · JPL |
| 872170 | 2018 AJ_{56} | — | December 13, 2017 | Mount Lemmon | Mount Lemmon Survey | · | 960 m | MPC · JPL |
| 872171 | 2018 AN_{56} | — | May 20, 2015 | Cerro Tololo | DECam | · | 910 m | MPC · JPL |
| 872172 | 2018 AJ_{58} | — | January 11, 2018 | Haleakala | Pan-STARRS 1 | · | 1.3 km | MPC · JPL |
| 872173 | 2018 AP_{61} | — | January 15, 2018 | Haleakala | Pan-STARRS 1 | · | 1.5 km | MPC · JPL |
| 872174 | 2018 AX_{61} | — | May 13, 2015 | Mount Lemmon | Mount Lemmon Survey | · | 690 m | MPC · JPL |
| 872175 | 2018 AG_{62} | — | January 13, 2018 | Mount Lemmon | Mount Lemmon Survey | PHO | 530 m | MPC · JPL |
| 872176 | 2018 AT_{62} | — | August 8, 2016 | Haleakala | Pan-STARRS 1 | 526 | 1.6 km | MPC · JPL |
| 872177 | 2018 AA_{63} | — | January 13, 2018 | Mount Lemmon | Mount Lemmon Survey | · | 1.5 km | MPC · JPL |
| 872178 | 2018 AG_{65} | — | March 26, 2007 | Mount Lemmon | Mount Lemmon Survey | MAS | 630 m | MPC · JPL |
| 872179 | 2018 AJ_{65} | — | January 12, 2018 | Haleakala | Pan-STARRS 1 | · | 690 m | MPC · JPL |
| 872180 | 2018 AS_{72} | — | April 4, 2014 | Mount Lemmon | Mount Lemmon Survey | GEF | 960 m | MPC · JPL |
| 872181 | 2018 AO_{75} | — | January 15, 2018 | Haleakala | Pan-STARRS 1 | L5 | 6.9 km | MPC · JPL |
| 872182 | 2018 AQ_{77} | — | January 15, 2018 | Haleakala | Pan-STARRS 1 | TIR | 1.8 km | MPC · JPL |
| 872183 | 2018 BM | — | January 15, 2015 | Haleakala | Pan-STARRS 1 | · | 890 m | MPC · JPL |
| 872184 | 2018 BN | — | April 30, 2003 | Kitt Peak | Spacewatch | H | 490 m | MPC · JPL |
| 872185 | 2018 BW_{2} | — | January 29, 2014 | Kitt Peak | Spacewatch | · | 1.0 km | MPC · JPL |
| 872186 | 2018 BZ_{3} | — | May 30, 2016 | Haleakala | Pan-STARRS 1 | H | 340 m | MPC · JPL |
| 872187 | 2018 BR_{4} | — | December 7, 2013 | Catalina | CSS | · | 1.2 km | MPC · JPL |
| 872188 | 2018 BM_{9} | — | November 21, 2017 | Haleakala | Pan-STARRS 1 | JUN | 810 m | MPC · JPL |
| 872189 | 2018 BQ_{12} | — | January 15, 2018 | Haleakala | Pan-STARRS 1 | EOS | 1.1 km | MPC · JPL |
| 872190 | 2018 BE_{13} | — | June 26, 2015 | Haleakala | Pan-STARRS 1 | · | 2.0 km | MPC · JPL |
| 872191 | 2018 BQ_{13} | — | January 16, 2018 | Haleakala | Pan-STARRS 1 | PHO | 510 m | MPC · JPL |
| 872192 | 2018 BX_{13} | — | January 20, 2018 | Haleakala | Pan-STARRS 1 | · | 1.1 km | MPC · JPL |
| 872193 | 2018 BY_{13} | — | January 20, 2018 | Haleakala | Pan-STARRS 1 | · | 1.6 km | MPC · JPL |
| 872194 | 2018 BL_{14} | — | January 20, 2018 | Haleakala | Pan-STARRS 1 | · | 1.0 km | MPC · JPL |
| 872195 | 2018 BB_{16} | — | January 23, 2018 | Mount Lemmon | Mount Lemmon Survey | DOR | 1.6 km | MPC · JPL |
| 872196 | 2018 BC_{17} | — | January 27, 2018 | Mount Lemmon | Mount Lemmon Survey | MAR | 680 m | MPC · JPL |
| 872197 | 2018 BG_{17} | — | January 17, 2018 | Haleakala | Pan-STARRS 1 | EOS | 1.2 km | MPC · JPL |
| 872198 | 2018 BJ_{17} | — | January 20, 2014 | Mount Lemmon | Mount Lemmon Survey | · | 940 m | MPC · JPL |
| 872199 | 2018 BM_{17} | — | January 16, 2018 | Haleakala | Pan-STARRS 1 | · | 900 m | MPC · JPL |
| 872200 | 2018 BT_{17} | — | September 12, 2013 | Mount Lemmon | Mount Lemmon Survey | NYS | 640 m | MPC · JPL |

== 872201–872300 ==
back to top

| Designation | | | Discovery | | | Properties | | Ref |
| Permanent | Provisional | Named after | Date | Site | Discoverer(s) | Category | Diam. | Ref |
|---|---|---|---|---|---|---|---|---|
| 872201 | 2018 BV_{17} | — | February 25, 2011 | Mount Lemmon | Mount Lemmon Survey | · | 530 m | MPC · JPL |
| 872202 | 2018 BW_{17} | — | January 20, 2018 | Haleakala | Pan-STARRS 1 | EOS | 1.3 km | MPC · JPL |
| 872203 | 2018 BE_{18} | — | January 26, 2018 | Mount Lemmon | Mount Lemmon Survey | H | 410 m | MPC · JPL |
| 872204 | 2018 BJ_{19} | — | January 20, 2018 | Haleakala | Pan-STARRS 1 | · | 960 m | MPC · JPL |
| 872205 | 2018 BG_{20} | — | January 17, 2018 | Haleakala | Pan-STARRS 1 | · | 640 m | MPC · JPL |
| 872206 | 2018 BQ_{21} | — | January 16, 2018 | Haleakala | Pan-STARRS 1 | · | 1.2 km | MPC · JPL |
| 872207 | 2018 BE_{22} | — | January 16, 2018 | Haleakala | Pan-STARRS 1 | · | 800 m | MPC · JPL |
| 872208 | 2018 BV_{22} | — | January 16, 2018 | Haleakala | Pan-STARRS 1 | · | 2.1 km | MPC · JPL |
| 872209 | 2018 BM_{23} | — | May 27, 2014 | Haleakala | Pan-STARRS 1 | · | 1.8 km | MPC · JPL |
| 872210 | 2018 BP_{24} | — | January 20, 2018 | Haleakala | Pan-STARRS 1 | L5 | 5.9 km | MPC · JPL |
| 872211 | 2018 BB_{25} | — | August 26, 2012 | Haleakala | Pan-STARRS 1 | · | 780 m | MPC · JPL |
| 872212 | 2018 BK_{25} | — | May 21, 2015 | Haleakala | Pan-STARRS 1 | · | 740 m | MPC · JPL |
| 872213 | 2018 BO_{25} | — | December 25, 2010 | Mount Lemmon | Mount Lemmon Survey | · | 530 m | MPC · JPL |
| 872214 | 2018 BS_{25} | — | January 20, 2018 | Haleakala | Pan-STARRS 1 | EUN | 840 m | MPC · JPL |
| 872215 | 2018 BJ_{26} | — | January 16, 2018 | Haleakala | Pan-STARRS 1 | L5 | 5.3 km | MPC · JPL |
| 872216 | 2018 BQ_{27} | — | January 16, 2018 | Haleakala | Pan-STARRS 1 | · | 2.0 km | MPC · JPL |
| 872217 | 2018 BB_{28} | — | January 19, 2018 | Mount Lemmon | Mount Lemmon Survey | HNS | 890 m | MPC · JPL |
| 872218 | 2018 BP_{28} | — | January 16, 2018 | Haleakala | Pan-STARRS 1 | · | 940 m | MPC · JPL |
| 872219 | 2018 BS_{33} | — | January 20, 2018 | Haleakala | Pan-STARRS 1 | PHO | 860 m | MPC · JPL |
| 872220 | 2018 BO_{39} | — | January 20, 2018 | Mount Lemmon | Mount Lemmon Survey | · | 1.3 km | MPC · JPL |
| 872221 | 2018 BV_{39} | — | October 25, 2016 | Haleakala | Pan-STARRS 1 | · | 1.5 km | MPC · JPL |
| 872222 | 2018 BO_{40} | — | January 20, 2018 | Haleakala | Pan-STARRS 1 | · | 1.6 km | MPC · JPL |
| 872223 | 2018 BH_{43} | — | January 16, 2018 | Haleakala | Pan-STARRS 1 | · | 1.2 km | MPC · JPL |
| 872224 | 2018 BT_{45} | — | January 20, 2018 | Haleakala | Pan-STARRS 1 | · | 490 m | MPC · JPL |
| 872225 | 2018 BE_{49} | — | January 20, 2018 | Haleakala | Pan-STARRS 1 | · | 990 m | MPC · JPL |
| 872226 | 2018 BL_{49} | — | January 16, 2018 | Haleakala | Pan-STARRS 1 | L5 | 7.0 km | MPC · JPL |
| 872227 | 2018 BT_{49} | — | January 18, 2018 | Mount Lemmon | Mount Lemmon Survey | PHO | 650 m | MPC · JPL |
| 872228 | 2018 BV_{49} | — | January 16, 2018 | Haleakala | Pan-STARRS 1 | L5 | 7.4 km | MPC · JPL |
| 872229 | 2018 BL_{50} | — | November 30, 2008 | Mount Lemmon | Mount Lemmon Survey | · | 980 m | MPC · JPL |
| 872230 | 2018 BJ_{57} | — | October 21, 2012 | Kitt Peak | Spacewatch | · | 880 m | MPC · JPL |
| 872231 | 2018 BU_{68} | — | October 18, 2007 | Kitt Peak | Spacewatch | · | 1.1 km | MPC · JPL |
| 872232 | 2018 BV_{74} | — | January 16, 2018 | Haleakala | Pan-STARRS 1 | L5 | 5.3 km | MPC · JPL |
| 872233 | 2018 BL_{126} | — | August 12, 2016 | Haleakala | Pan-STARRS 1 | · | 1.1 km | MPC · JPL |
| 872234 | 2018 CM_{1} | — | April 17, 2013 | Haleakala | Pan-STARRS 1 | H | 420 m | MPC · JPL |
| 872235 | 2018 CN_{1} | — | November 29, 2014 | Haleakala | Pan-STARRS 1 | H | 450 m | MPC · JPL |
| 872236 Carlgrillmair | 2018 CY_{4} | Carlgrillmair | April 12, 2015 | WISE | WISE | PHO | 880 m | MPC · JPL |
| 872237 | 2018 CX_{5} | — | February 6, 2014 | Catalina | CSS | · | 970 m | MPC · JPL |
| 872238 | 2018 CJ_{6} | — | December 14, 2017 | Mount Lemmon | Mount Lemmon Survey | H | 460 m | MPC · JPL |
| 872239 | 2018 CK_{6} | — | November 21, 2017 | Mount Lemmon | Mount Lemmon Survey | · | 1.5 km | MPC · JPL |
| 872240 | 2018 CV_{6} | — | October 29, 2017 | Mount Lemmon | Mount Lemmon Survey | (116763) | 1.4 km | MPC · JPL |
| 872241 | 2018 CO_{7} | — | October 12, 2010 | Mount Lemmon | Mount Lemmon Survey | · | 460 m | MPC · JPL |
| 872242 | 2018 CC_{8} | — | December 8, 2014 | Haleakala | Pan-STARRS 1 | H | 480 m | MPC · JPL |
| 872243 | 2018 CR_{12} | — | October 21, 2012 | Haleakala | Pan-STARRS 1 | · | 1.0 km | MPC · JPL |
| 872244 | 2018 CN_{17} | — | February 12, 2018 | Haleakala | Pan-STARRS 1 | · | 1.1 km | MPC · JPL |
| 872245 | 2018 CJ_{19} | — | February 12, 2018 | Haleakala | Pan-STARRS 1 | · | 1.3 km | MPC · JPL |
| 872246 | 2018 CO_{19} | — | February 12, 2018 | Haleakala | Pan-STARRS 1 | · | 1.6 km | MPC · JPL |
| 872247 | 2018 CC_{20} | — | February 11, 2018 | Haleakala | Pan-STARRS 1 | EOS | 1.4 km | MPC · JPL |
| 872248 | 2018 CJ_{20} | — | February 12, 2018 | Haleakala | Pan-STARRS 1 | EOS | 1.3 km | MPC · JPL |
| 872249 | 2018 CQ_{21} | — | February 12, 2018 | Haleakala | Pan-STARRS 1 | · | 1.0 km | MPC · JPL |
| 872250 | 2018 CK_{23} | — | February 11, 2018 | Haleakala | Pan-STARRS 1 | · | 1.5 km | MPC · JPL |
| 872251 | 2018 CL_{23} | — | May 28, 2014 | Haleakala | Pan-STARRS 1 | · | 1.4 km | MPC · JPL |
| 872252 | 2018 CE_{26} | — | February 4, 2018 | Mount Lemmon | Mount Lemmon Survey | · | 1.1 km | MPC · JPL |
| 872253 | 2018 CQ_{26} | — | February 12, 2018 | Haleakala | Pan-STARRS 1 | · | 2.4 km | MPC · JPL |
| 872254 | 2018 CY_{26} | — | January 5, 2018 | Mount Lemmon | Mount Lemmon Survey | EUP | 2.3 km | MPC · JPL |
| 872255 | 2018 CZ_{26} | — | February 12, 2018 | Haleakala | Pan-STARRS 1 | · | 2.2 km | MPC · JPL |
| 872256 | 2018 CD_{27} | — | February 9, 2018 | Mount Lemmon | Mount Lemmon Survey | · | 2.8 km | MPC · JPL |
| 872257 | 2018 CP_{27} | — | April 23, 2014 | Cerro Tololo | DECam | · | 1.0 km | MPC · JPL |
| 872258 | 2018 CG_{28} | — | February 12, 2018 | Haleakala | Pan-STARRS 1 | KOR | 910 m | MPC · JPL |
| 872259 | 2018 CH_{28} | — | September 3, 2016 | Mount Lemmon | Mount Lemmon Survey | TIR | 2.0 km | MPC · JPL |
| 872260 | 2018 CO_{30} | — | February 12, 2018 | Haleakala | Pan-STARRS 1 | · | 2.3 km | MPC · JPL |
| 872261 | 2018 CR_{34} | — | February 12, 2018 | Haleakala | Pan-STARRS 1 | THB | 2.1 km | MPC · JPL |
| 872262 | 2018 CE_{38} | — | February 12, 2018 | Haleakala | Pan-STARRS 1 | L5 | 6.2 km | MPC · JPL |
| 872263 | 2018 DW_{2} | — | March 13, 2008 | Kitt Peak | Spacewatch | · | 1.4 km | MPC · JPL |
| 872264 | 2018 DU_{3} | — | November 9, 2014 | Haleakala | Pan-STARRS 1 | H | 470 m | MPC · JPL |
| 872265 | 2018 DH_{5} | — | April 29, 2014 | Haleakala | Pan-STARRS 1 | EUN | 780 m | MPC · JPL |
| 872266 | 2018 DN_{5} | — | February 26, 2018 | Mount Lemmon | Mount Lemmon Survey | · | 2.2 km | MPC · JPL |
| 872267 | 2018 DX_{5} | — | February 27, 2007 | Kitt Peak | Spacewatch | · | 790 m | MPC · JPL |
| 872268 | 2018 DV_{6} | — | February 17, 2018 | Mount Lemmon | Mount Lemmon Survey | · | 1.5 km | MPC · JPL |
| 872269 | 2018 DN_{7} | — | February 25, 2018 | Mount Lemmon | Mount Lemmon Survey | · | 1.9 km | MPC · JPL |
| 872270 | 2018 DK_{8} | — | June 22, 2015 | Haleakala | Pan-STARRS 1 | · | 440 m | MPC · JPL |
| 872271 | 2018 DR_{8} | — | February 17, 2018 | Mount Lemmon | Mount Lemmon Survey | · | 870 m | MPC · JPL |
| 872272 | 2018 DJ_{9} | — | March 30, 2011 | Haleakala | Pan-STARRS 1 | · | 820 m | MPC · JPL |
| 872273 | 2018 DH_{10} | — | April 23, 2014 | Cerro Tololo | DECam | · | 910 m | MPC · JPL |
| 872274 | 2018 DJ_{10} | — | February 22, 2018 | Mount Lemmon | Mount Lemmon Survey | · | 1.9 km | MPC · JPL |
| 872275 | 2018 DD_{11} | — | February 25, 2018 | Mount Lemmon | Mount Lemmon Survey | · | 1.5 km | MPC · JPL |
| 872276 | 2018 DK_{13} | — | January 3, 2014 | Kitt Peak | Spacewatch | NYS | 780 m | MPC · JPL |
| 872277 | 2018 DT_{13} | — | February 22, 2018 | Mount Lemmon | Mount Lemmon Survey | · | 750 m | MPC · JPL |
| 872278 | 2018 DX_{17} | — | February 19, 2009 | Kitt Peak | Spacewatch | · | 1.5 km | MPC · JPL |
| 872279 | 2018 DZ_{17} | — | February 20, 2018 | Haleakala | Pan-STARRS 1 | L5 | 7.3 km | MPC · JPL |
| 872280 | 2018 EH_{1} | — | December 3, 2014 | Haleakala | Pan-STARRS 1 | H | 540 m | MPC · JPL |
| 872281 | 2018 EF_{2} | — | December 9, 2014 | Haleakala | Pan-STARRS 1 | H | 440 m | MPC · JPL |
| 872282 | 2018 EM_{3} | — | January 20, 2018 | Mount Lemmon | Mount Lemmon Survey | H | 480 m | MPC · JPL |
| 872283 | 2018 ET_{6} | — | March 16, 2007 | Kitt Peak | Spacewatch | PHO | 750 m | MPC · JPL |
| 872284 | 2018 EF_{7} | — | March 19, 2013 | Haleakala | Pan-STARRS 1 | · | 1.6 km | MPC · JPL |
| 872285 | 2018 EN_{7} | — | September 16, 2012 | ESA OGS | ESA OGS | · | 1.3 km | MPC · JPL |
| 872286 | 2018 EX_{9} | — | April 5, 2011 | Mount Lemmon | Mount Lemmon Survey | · | 600 m | MPC · JPL |
| 872287 | 2018 EP_{10} | — | March 10, 2018 | Haleakala | Pan-STARRS 1 | · | 850 m | MPC · JPL |
| 872288 | 2018 EU_{10} | — | March 6, 2018 | Haleakala | Pan-STARRS 1 | · | 720 m | MPC · JPL |
| 872289 | 2018 EK_{11} | — | March 10, 2018 | Haleakala | Pan-STARRS 1 | KOR | 1.1 km | MPC · JPL |
| 872290 | 2018 EO_{11} | — | March 11, 2018 | Haleakala | Pan-STARRS 1 | EUN | 830 m | MPC · JPL |
| 872291 | 2018 EQ_{11} | — | March 11, 2018 | Haleakala | Pan-STARRS 1 | · | 1.8 km | MPC · JPL |
| 872292 | 2018 EB_{12} | — | March 10, 2018 | Haleakala | Pan-STARRS 1 | EOS | 1.5 km | MPC · JPL |
| 872293 | 2018 ET_{12} | — | March 10, 2018 | Haleakala | Pan-STARRS 1 | · | 520 m | MPC · JPL |
| 872294 | 2018 EU_{19} | — | March 7, 2018 | Haleakala | Pan-STARRS 1 | · | 1.8 km | MPC · JPL |
| 872295 | 2018 FL | — | October 8, 2012 | Mount Lemmon | Mount Lemmon Survey | · | 600 m | MPC · JPL |
| 872296 | 2018 FN | — | March 31, 2013 | Kitt Peak | Spacewatch | H | 340 m | MPC · JPL |
| 872297 | 2018 FP_{6} | — | January 18, 2013 | Haleakala | Pan-STARRS 1 | · | 1.2 km | MPC · JPL |
| 872298 | 2018 FS_{6} | — | February 27, 2006 | Mount Lemmon | Mount Lemmon Survey | L5 | 5.7 km | MPC · JPL |
| 872299 | 2018 FT_{6} | — | August 20, 2014 | Haleakala | Pan-STARRS 1 | · | 1.9 km | MPC · JPL |
| 872300 | 2018 FX_{7} | — | February 23, 2018 | Mount Lemmon | Mount Lemmon Survey | · | 2.1 km | MPC · JPL |

== 872301–872400 ==
back to top

| Designation | | | Discovery | | | Properties | | Ref |
| Permanent | Provisional | Named after | Date | Site | Discoverer(s) | Category | Diam. | Ref |
|---|---|---|---|---|---|---|---|---|
| 872301 | 2018 FE_{8} | — | March 17, 2018 | Haleakala | Pan-STARRS 1 | · | 870 m | MPC · JPL |
| 872302 | 2018 FO_{9} | — | May 4, 2014 | Mount Lemmon | Mount Lemmon Survey | · | 1.6 km | MPC · JPL |
| 872303 | 2018 FA_{10} | — | September 23, 2012 | Kitt Peak | Spacewatch | · | 670 m | MPC · JPL |
| 872304 | 2018 FN_{11} | — | July 8, 2014 | Haleakala | Pan-STARRS 1 | · | 1.4 km | MPC · JPL |
| 872305 | 2018 FQ_{12} | — | August 27, 2016 | Haleakala | Pan-STARRS 1 | · | 1.4 km | MPC · JPL |
| 872306 | 2018 FO_{14} | — | November 24, 2011 | Haleakala | Pan-STARRS 1 | · | 1.2 km | MPC · JPL |
| 872307 | 2018 FL_{17} | — | October 12, 2016 | Haleakala | Pan-STARRS 1 | · | 1.1 km | MPC · JPL |
| 872308 | 2018 FO_{22} | — | October 26, 2011 | Haleakala | Pan-STARRS 1 | · | 1.3 km | MPC · JPL |
| 872309 | 2018 FV_{23} | — | May 11, 2015 | Mount Lemmon | Mount Lemmon Survey | · | 440 m | MPC · JPL |
| 872310 | 2018 FT_{25} | — | October 26, 2005 | Kitt Peak | Spacewatch | · | 1.8 km | MPC · JPL |
| 872311 | 2018 FX_{25} | — | April 28, 2014 | Cerro Tololo | DECam | · | 1.5 km | MPC · JPL |
| 872312 | 2018 FL_{27} | — | April 19, 2013 | Haleakala | Pan-STARRS 1 | · | 1.7 km | MPC · JPL |
| 872313 | 2018 FG_{31} | — | March 17, 2018 | Mount Lemmon | Mount Lemmon Survey | · | 2.2 km | MPC · JPL |
| 872314 | 2018 FA_{33} | — | February 23, 2018 | Mount Lemmon | Mount Lemmon Survey | · | 2.1 km | MPC · JPL |
| 872315 | 2018 FB_{33} | — | February 16, 2012 | Haleakala | Pan-STARRS 1 | EUP | 2.4 km | MPC · JPL |
| 872316 | 2018 FG_{33} | — | March 17, 2018 | Haleakala | Pan-STARRS 1 | LIX | 2.0 km | MPC · JPL |
| 872317 | 2018 FL_{33} | — | February 23, 2018 | Mount Lemmon | Mount Lemmon Survey | · | 2.2 km | MPC · JPL |
| 872318 | 2018 FO_{34} | — | March 20, 2018 | Mount Lemmon | Mount Lemmon Survey | · | 1.3 km | MPC · JPL |
| 872319 | 2018 FR_{34} | — | March 18, 2018 | Haleakala | Pan-STARRS 1 | NEM | 1.6 km | MPC · JPL |
| 872320 | 2018 FB_{35} | — | March 18, 2018 | Haleakala | Pan-STARRS 1 | · | 2.5 km | MPC · JPL |
| 872321 | 2018 FF_{35} | — | March 28, 2018 | Mount Lemmon | Mount Lemmon Survey | · | 2.7 km | MPC · JPL |
| 872322 | 2018 FU_{35} | — | February 25, 2007 | Mount Lemmon | Mount Lemmon Survey | · | 790 m | MPC · JPL |
| 872323 | 2018 FW_{35} | — | March 17, 2018 | Mount Lemmon | Mount Lemmon Survey | · | 2.5 km | MPC · JPL |
| 872324 | 2018 FY_{37} | — | March 21, 2018 | Mount Lemmon | Mount Lemmon Survey | · | 2.3 km | MPC · JPL |
| 872325 | 2018 FZ_{37} | — | March 17, 2018 | Haleakala | Pan-STARRS 1 | BRA | 1.1 km | MPC · JPL |
| 872326 | 2018 FB_{38} | — | March 17, 2018 | Haleakala | Pan-STARRS 1 | · | 530 m | MPC · JPL |
| 872327 | 2018 FC_{38} | — | March 17, 2018 | Haleakala | Pan-STARRS 1 | KOR | 1.2 km | MPC · JPL |
| 872328 | 2018 FD_{38} | — | March 17, 2018 | Haleakala | Pan-STARRS 1 | EOS | 1.5 km | MPC · JPL |
| 872329 | 2018 FE_{38} | — | March 17, 2018 | Haleakala | Pan-STARRS 1 | EOS | 1.3 km | MPC · JPL |
| 872330 | 2018 FQ_{38} | — | March 18, 2018 | Haleakala | Pan-STARRS 1 | KOR | 1.2 km | MPC · JPL |
| 872331 | 2018 FT_{38} | — | March 17, 2018 | Mount Lemmon | Mount Lemmon Survey | · | 1.3 km | MPC · JPL |
| 872332 | 2018 FX_{38} | — | March 23, 2018 | Mount Lemmon | Mount Lemmon Survey | · | 1.2 km | MPC · JPL |
| 872333 | 2018 FY_{38} | — | March 17, 2018 | Haleakala | Pan-STARRS 1 | · | 1.3 km | MPC · JPL |
| 872334 | 2018 FT_{39} | — | March 18, 2018 | Haleakala | Pan-STARRS 1 | · | 860 m | MPC · JPL |
| 872335 | 2018 FU_{39} | — | March 20, 2018 | Mount Lemmon | Mount Lemmon Survey | EOS | 1.4 km | MPC · JPL |
| 872336 | 2018 FG_{40} | — | March 17, 2018 | Haleakala | Pan-STARRS 1 | · | 2.1 km | MPC · JPL |
| 872337 | 2018 FC_{41} | — | March 18, 2018 | Haleakala | Pan-STARRS 1 | · | 1.4 km | MPC · JPL |
| 872338 | 2018 FF_{42} | — | March 17, 2018 | Haleakala | Pan-STARRS 1 | · | 480 m | MPC · JPL |
| 872339 | 2018 FH_{42} | — | March 18, 2018 | Haleakala | Pan-STARRS 1 | · | 450 m | MPC · JPL |
| 872340 | 2018 FN_{42} | — | March 17, 2018 | Haleakala | Pan-STARRS 1 | · | 2.3 km | MPC · JPL |
| 872341 | 2018 FP_{42} | — | March 22, 2018 | Mount Lemmon | Mount Lemmon Survey | · | 1.6 km | MPC · JPL |
| 872342 | 2018 FS_{42} | — | May 8, 2014 | Haleakala | Pan-STARRS 1 | · | 790 m | MPC · JPL |
| 872343 | 2018 FU_{42} | — | March 17, 2018 | Haleakala | Pan-STARRS 1 | · | 660 m | MPC · JPL |
| 872344 | 2018 FY_{42} | — | March 18, 2018 | Haleakala | Pan-STARRS 1 | HYG | 1.9 km | MPC · JPL |
| 872345 | 2018 FQ_{43} | — | March 20, 2018 | Mount Lemmon | Mount Lemmon Survey | · | 480 m | MPC · JPL |
| 872346 | 2018 FS_{43} | — | March 19, 2018 | Haleakala | Pan-STARRS 1 | · | 1.3 km | MPC · JPL |
| 872347 | 2018 FT_{43} | — | March 17, 2018 | Haleakala | Pan-STARRS 1 | EOS | 1.4 km | MPC · JPL |
| 872348 | 2018 FV_{44} | — | March 20, 2018 | Mount Lemmon | Mount Lemmon Survey | · | 570 m | MPC · JPL |
| 872349 | 2018 FX_{44} | — | April 29, 2014 | Haleakala | Pan-STARRS 1 | · | 890 m | MPC · JPL |
| 872350 | 2018 FL_{46} | — | March 18, 2018 | Haleakala | Pan-STARRS 1 | EOS | 1.5 km | MPC · JPL |
| 872351 | 2018 FQ_{46} | — | March 17, 2018 | Haleakala | Pan-STARRS 1 | · | 510 m | MPC · JPL |
| 872352 | 2018 FV_{46} | — | March 27, 2018 | Cerro Paranal | Gaia Ground Based Optical Tracking | · | 380 m | MPC · JPL |
| 872353 | 2018 FZ_{46} | — | March 16, 2018 | Mount Lemmon | Mount Lemmon Survey | · | 2.4 km | MPC · JPL |
| 872354 | 2018 FS_{47} | — | March 16, 2018 | Mount Lemmon | Mount Lemmon Survey | · | 1.7 km | MPC · JPL |
| 872355 | 2018 FX_{47} | — | March 18, 2018 | Haleakala | Pan-STARRS 1 | EOS | 1.4 km | MPC · JPL |
| 872356 | 2018 FA_{48} | — | March 18, 2018 | Haleakala | Pan-STARRS 1 | · | 2.1 km | MPC · JPL |
| 872357 | 2018 FE_{48} | — | March 17, 2018 | Haleakala | Pan-STARRS 1 | · | 2.2 km | MPC · JPL |
| 872358 | 2018 FE_{49} | — | March 16, 2018 | Mount Lemmon | Mount Lemmon Survey | · | 2.1 km | MPC · JPL |
| 872359 | 2018 FN_{49} | — | March 18, 2018 | Mount Lemmon | Mount Lemmon Survey | · | 1.4 km | MPC · JPL |
| 872360 | 2018 FP_{49} | — | March 17, 2018 | Haleakala | Pan-STARRS 1 | · | 2.3 km | MPC · JPL |
| 872361 | 2018 FV_{53} | — | March 25, 2007 | Mount Lemmon | Mount Lemmon Survey | · | 2.2 km | MPC · JPL |
| 872362 | 2018 FY_{55} | — | March 27, 2018 | Mount Lemmon | Mount Lemmon Survey | · | 1.9 km | MPC · JPL |
| 872363 | 2018 FL_{56} | — | January 18, 2005 | Kitt Peak | Spacewatch | (5) | 820 m | MPC · JPL |
| 872364 | 2018 FY_{57} | — | March 17, 2018 | Haleakala | Pan-STARRS 1 | · | 640 m | MPC · JPL |
| 872365 | 2018 FR_{59} | — | March 18, 2018 | Mount Lemmon | Mount Lemmon Survey | · | 550 m | MPC · JPL |
| 872366 | 2018 FW_{59} | — | April 29, 2008 | Mount Lemmon | Mount Lemmon Survey | · | 540 m | MPC · JPL |
| 872367 | 2018 FU_{60} | — | March 16, 2018 | Mount Lemmon | Mount Lemmon Survey | · | 1.7 km | MPC · JPL |
| 872368 | 2018 FA_{61} | — | March 24, 2018 | Mount Lemmon | Mount Lemmon Survey | TIR | 2.0 km | MPC · JPL |
| 872369 | 2018 FF_{62} | — | March 18, 2018 | Haleakala | Pan-STARRS 1 | · | 2.1 km | MPC · JPL |
| 872370 | 2018 FN_{63} | — | March 17, 2018 | Haleakala | Pan-STARRS 1 | · | 1.8 km | MPC · JPL |
| 872371 | 2018 FK_{67} | — | March 28, 2018 | Cerro Paranal | Gaia Ground Based Optical Tracking | · | 650 m | MPC · JPL |
| 872372 | 2018 FR_{67} | — | March 18, 2018 | Haleakala | Pan-STARRS 1 | · | 1.8 km | MPC · JPL |
| 872373 | 2018 FK_{69} | — | March 18, 2018 | Haleakala | Pan-STARRS 1 | (895) | 2.2 km | MPC · JPL |
| 872374 | 2018 FO_{70} | — | March 21, 2018 | Mount Lemmon | Mount Lemmon Survey | EUP | 2.0 km | MPC · JPL |
| 872375 | 2018 FZ_{70} | — | March 19, 2018 | Haleakala | Pan-STARRS 1 | · | 2.3 km | MPC · JPL |
| 872376 | 2018 FH_{73} | — | March 17, 2018 | Haleakala | Pan-STARRS 1 | · | 490 m | MPC · JPL |
| 872377 | 2018 FO_{78} | — | March 21, 2018 | Mount Lemmon | Mount Lemmon Survey | · | 620 m | MPC · JPL |
| 872378 | 2018 FA_{79} | — | October 29, 2005 | Mount Lemmon | Mount Lemmon Survey | · | 2.0 km | MPC · JPL |
| 872379 | 2018 GC_{1} | — | January 27, 2015 | Haleakala | Pan-STARRS 1 | H | 440 m | MPC · JPL |
| 872380 | 2018 GY_{2} | — | March 17, 2018 | Mount Lemmon | Mount Lemmon Survey | H | 420 m | MPC · JPL |
| 872381 | 2018 GR_{3} | — | April 10, 2005 | Catalina | CSS | · | 1.3 km | MPC · JPL |
| 872382 | 2018 GH_{6} | — | May 2, 2014 | Catalina | CSS | · | 1.3 km | MPC · JPL |
| 872383 | 2018 GO_{6} | — | May 12, 2007 | Catalina | CSS | T_{j} (2.92) | 2.8 km | MPC · JPL |
| 872384 | 2018 GE_{8} | — | October 10, 2015 | Haleakala | Pan-STARRS 1 | · | 1.5 km | MPC · JPL |
| 872385 | 2018 GF_{10} | — | May 16, 2015 | Cerro Paranal | Gaia Ground Based Optical Tracking | · | 430 m | MPC · JPL |
| 872386 | 2018 GV_{11} | — | March 31, 2009 | Kitt Peak | Spacewatch | · | 1.3 km | MPC · JPL |
| 872387 | 2018 GZ_{12} | — | April 12, 2018 | Haleakala | Pan-STARRS 1 | · | 1.6 km | MPC · JPL |
| 872388 | 2018 GR_{13} | — | April 12, 2018 | Haleakala | Pan-STARRS 1 | · | 1.2 km | MPC · JPL |
| 872389 | 2018 GV_{13} | — | April 14, 2018 | XuYi | PMO NEO Survey Program | · | 1.3 km | MPC · JPL |
| 872390 | 2018 GZ_{15} | — | April 3, 2018 | Cerro Paranal | Gaia Ground Based Optical Tracking | · | 1.8 km | MPC · JPL |
| 872391 | 2018 GJ_{16} | — | April 15, 2018 | Mount Lemmon | Mount Lemmon Survey | · | 560 m | MPC · JPL |
| 872392 | 2018 GJ_{17} | — | April 13, 2018 | Haleakala | Pan-STARRS 1 | · | 1.5 km | MPC · JPL |
| 872393 | 2018 GP_{17} | — | April 12, 2018 | Mount Lemmon | Mount Lemmon Survey | EOS | 1.4 km | MPC · JPL |
| 872394 | 2018 GZ_{17} | — | April 12, 2018 | Haleakala | Pan-STARRS 1 | T_{j} (2.99) | 2.8 km | MPC · JPL |
| 872395 | 2018 GA_{18} | — | April 12, 2018 | Haleakala | Pan-STARRS 1 | · | 1.5 km | MPC · JPL |
| 872396 | 2018 GD_{18} | — | April 13, 2018 | Haleakala | Pan-STARRS 1 | · | 1.5 km | MPC · JPL |
| 872397 | 2018 GJ_{18} | — | April 12, 2018 | Haleakala | Pan-STARRS 1 | · | 2.1 km | MPC · JPL |
| 872398 | 2018 GG_{19} | — | May 7, 2014 | Haleakala | Pan-STARRS 1 | · | 1.0 km | MPC · JPL |
| 872399 | 2018 GZ_{19} | — | April 14, 2018 | Mount Lemmon | Mount Lemmon Survey | · | 460 m | MPC · JPL |
| 872400 | 2018 GS_{20} | — | April 11, 2018 | Mount Lemmon | Mount Lemmon Survey | H | 280 m | MPC · JPL |

== 872401–872500 ==
back to top

| Designation | | | Discovery | | | Properties | | Ref |
| Permanent | Provisional | Named after | Date | Site | Discoverer(s) | Category | Diam. | Ref |
|---|---|---|---|---|---|---|---|---|
| 872401 | 2018 GU_{20} | — | April 15, 2018 | Mount Lemmon | Mount Lemmon Survey | · | 1.5 km | MPC · JPL |
| 872402 | 2018 GE_{21} | — | April 15, 2018 | Mount Lemmon | Mount Lemmon Survey | · | 400 m | MPC · JPL |
| 872403 | 2018 GW_{21} | — | April 11, 2018 | Mount Lemmon | Mount Lemmon Survey | · | 2.0 km | MPC · JPL |
| 872404 | 2018 GX_{21} | — | April 13, 2018 | Haleakala | Pan-STARRS 1 | · | 970 m | MPC · JPL |
| 872405 | 2018 GG_{22} | — | January 19, 2015 | Mount Lemmon | Mount Lemmon Survey | H | 400 m | MPC · JPL |
| 872406 | 2018 GG_{23} | — | October 26, 2011 | Haleakala | Pan-STARRS 1 | · | 1.4 km | MPC · JPL |
| 872407 | 2018 GZ_{24} | — | April 14, 2018 | Mount Lemmon | Mount Lemmon Survey | · | 1.4 km | MPC · JPL |
| 872408 | 2018 GX_{28} | — | September 7, 2008 | Mount Lemmon | Mount Lemmon Survey | · | 1.8 km | MPC · JPL |
| 872409 | 2018 GP_{29} | — | April 13, 2018 | Haleakala | Pan-STARRS 1 | · | 2.1 km | MPC · JPL |
| 872410 | 2018 GD_{31} | — | April 13, 2018 | Haleakala | Pan-STARRS 1 | · | 2.4 km | MPC · JPL |
| 872411 | 2018 GK_{31} | — | November 22, 2014 | Haleakala | Pan-STARRS 1 | · | 2.6 km | MPC · JPL |
| 872412 | 2018 GZ_{34} | — | October 16, 2020 | Mount Lemmon | Mount Lemmon Survey | · | 1.6 km | MPC · JPL |
| 872413 | 2018 GB_{41} | — | July 28, 2014 | Haleakala | Pan-STARRS 1 | · | 1.4 km | MPC · JPL |
| 872414 | 2018 GV_{43} | — | April 12, 2018 | Haleakala | Pan-STARRS 1 | · | 680 m | MPC · JPL |
| 872415 | 2018 HK_{5} | — | April 23, 2018 | Mount Lemmon | Mount Lemmon Survey | EUN | 860 m | MPC · JPL |
| 872416 | 2018 HL_{5} | — | April 16, 2018 | Haleakala | Pan-STARRS 1 | THB | 2.3 km | MPC · JPL |
| 872417 | 2018 HQ_{5} | — | April 16, 2018 | Haleakala | Pan-STARRS 1 | · | 490 m | MPC · JPL |
| 872418 | 2018 HB_{6} | — | April 16, 2018 | Haleakala | Pan-STARRS 1 | · | 780 m | MPC · JPL |
| 872419 | 2018 HW_{6} | — | April 21, 2018 | Mount Lemmon | Mount Lemmon Survey | PHO | 590 m | MPC · JPL |
| 872420 | 2018 HX_{6} | — | February 27, 2012 | Haleakala | Pan-STARRS 1 | · | 2.5 km | MPC · JPL |
| 872421 | 2018 HB_{7} | — | April 16, 2018 | Haleakala | Pan-STARRS 1 | · | 620 m | MPC · JPL |
| 872422 | 2018 HO_{7} | — | April 23, 2018 | Mount Lemmon | Mount Lemmon Survey | · | 1.5 km | MPC · JPL |
| 872423 | 2018 HY_{8} | — | April 23, 2018 | Mount Lemmon | Mount Lemmon Survey | · | 2.1 km | MPC · JPL |
| 872424 | 2018 HR_{12} | — | April 16, 2018 | Mount Lemmon | Mount Lemmon Survey | T_{j} (2.99) | 2.6 km | MPC · JPL |
| 872425 | 2018 JS_{4} | — | April 5, 2014 | Haleakala | Pan-STARRS 1 | PHO | 710 m | MPC · JPL |
| 872426 | 2018 JT_{5} | — | September 26, 2005 | Kitt Peak | Spacewatch | KOR | 1.0 km | MPC · JPL |
| 872427 | 2018 JU_{5} | — | August 27, 2009 | Kitt Peak | Spacewatch | · | 1.1 km | MPC · JPL |
| 872428 | 2018 JY_{6} | — | March 30, 2010 | WISE | WISE | · | 830 m | MPC · JPL |
| 872429 | 2018 JH_{8} | — | May 11, 2018 | ESA OGS | ESA OGS | · | 510 m | MPC · JPL |
| 872430 | 2018 JY_{8} | — | May 14, 2018 | Mount Lemmon | Mount Lemmon Survey | · | 1.2 km | MPC · JPL |
| 872431 | 2018 JA_{9} | — | May 14, 2018 | Mount Lemmon | Mount Lemmon Survey | · | 2.1 km | MPC · JPL |
| 872432 | 2018 JG_{9} | — | May 14, 2018 | Kitt Peak | Spacewatch | · | 930 m | MPC · JPL |
| 872433 | 2018 JP_{9} | — | May 14, 2018 | Mount Lemmon | Mount Lemmon Survey | (895) | 3.1 km | MPC · JPL |
| 872434 | 2018 JB_{10} | — | March 18, 2007 | Kitt Peak | Spacewatch | · | 1.6 km | MPC · JPL |
| 872435 | 2018 JH_{10} | — | May 15, 2018 | Mount Lemmon | Mount Lemmon Survey | · | 610 m | MPC · JPL |
| 872436 | 2018 KM_{2} | — | May 21, 2018 | Haleakala | Pan-STARRS 1 | APO | 300 m | MPC · JPL |
| 872437 | 2018 KH_{4} | — | May 18, 2018 | Mount Lemmon | Mount Lemmon Survey | · | 1.0 km | MPC · JPL |
| 872438 | 2018 KP_{4} | — | May 20, 2018 | Haleakala | Pan-STARRS 1 | · | 2.4 km | MPC · JPL |
| 872439 | 2018 KL_{7} | — | November 7, 2015 | Mount Lemmon | Mount Lemmon Survey | · | 900 m | MPC · JPL |
| 872440 | 2018 KW_{7} | — | April 27, 2012 | Haleakala | Pan-STARRS 1 | (1118) | 2.1 km | MPC · JPL |
| 872441 | 2018 KR_{8} | — | May 18, 2018 | Mount Lemmon | Mount Lemmon Survey | · | 2.4 km | MPC · JPL |
| 872442 | 2018 KU_{8} | — | May 19, 2018 | Haleakala | Pan-STARRS 1 | · | 1.5 km | MPC · JPL |
| 872443 | 2018 KF_{9} | — | May 21, 2018 | Haleakala | Pan-STARRS 1 | · | 2.1 km | MPC · JPL |
| 872444 | 2018 KO_{9} | — | May 21, 2018 | Haleakala | Pan-STARRS 1 | VER | 2.0 km | MPC · JPL |
| 872445 | 2018 KT_{9} | — | May 20, 2018 | Haleakala | Pan-STARRS 1 | H | 340 m | MPC · JPL |
| 872446 | 2018 KC_{10} | — | May 19, 2018 | Haleakala | Pan-STARRS 1 | THM | 1.6 km | MPC · JPL |
| 872447 | 2018 KA_{11} | — | May 18, 2018 | Mount Lemmon | Mount Lemmon Survey | · | 450 m | MPC · JPL |
| 872448 | 2018 KJ_{12} | — | May 18, 2018 | Mount Lemmon | Mount Lemmon Survey | · | 2.3 km | MPC · JPL |
| 872449 | 2018 KY_{12} | — | May 19, 2018 | Haleakala | Pan-STARRS 1 | · | 1.7 km | MPC · JPL |
| 872450 | 2018 KB_{13} | — | May 19, 2018 | Haleakala | Pan-STARRS 1 | V | 430 m | MPC · JPL |
| 872451 | 2018 KO_{13} | — | February 28, 2012 | Haleakala | Pan-STARRS 1 | · | 2.1 km | MPC · JPL |
| 872452 | 2018 KE_{14} | — | May 21, 2018 | Haleakala | Pan-STARRS 1 | URS | 1.8 km | MPC · JPL |
| 872453 | 2018 KS_{14} | — | May 21, 2018 | Haleakala | Pan-STARRS 1 | EOS | 1.4 km | MPC · JPL |
| 872454 | 2018 KE_{24} | — | April 15, 2012 | Haleakala | Pan-STARRS 1 | · | 2.0 km | MPC · JPL |
| 872455 | 2018 KJ_{24} | — | May 21, 2018 | Haleakala | Pan-STARRS 1 | · | 2.1 km | MPC · JPL |
| 872456 | 2018 KR_{24} | — | May 17, 2018 | Mount Lemmon | Mount Lemmon Survey | · | 380 m | MPC · JPL |
| 872457 | 2018 KR_{26} | — | February 9, 2011 | Mount Lemmon | Mount Lemmon Survey | · | 2.5 km | MPC · JPL |
| 872458 | 2018 LS | — | September 28, 1997 | Kitt Peak | Spacewatch | · | 660 m | MPC · JPL |
| 872459 | 2018 LZ_{2} | — | September 25, 2016 | Mount Lemmon | Mount Lemmon Survey | H | 290 m | MPC · JPL |
| 872460 | 2018 LM_{3} | — | October 7, 2008 | Catalina | CSS | H | 400 m | MPC · JPL |
| 872461 | 2018 LB_{9} | — | June 17, 2007 | Kitt Peak | Spacewatch | · | 1.7 km | MPC · JPL |
| 872462 | 2018 LF_{11} | — | November 26, 2009 | Mount Lemmon | Mount Lemmon Survey | · | 2.4 km | MPC · JPL |
| 872463 | 2018 LQ_{11} | — | November 30, 2008 | Mount Lemmon | Mount Lemmon Survey | THB | 2.6 km | MPC · JPL |
| 872464 | 2018 LU_{11} | — | May 21, 2018 | Haleakala | Pan-STARRS 1 | · | 1.6 km | MPC · JPL |
| 872465 | 2018 LZ_{12} | — | October 3, 2013 | Catalina | CSS | · | 2.1 km | MPC · JPL |
| 872466 | 2018 LW_{13} | — | June 15, 2018 | Haleakala | Pan-STARRS 1 | · | 510 m | MPC · JPL |
| 872467 | 2018 LZ_{15} | — | September 25, 2005 | Kitt Peak | Spacewatch | · | 560 m | MPC · JPL |
| 872468 | 2018 LK_{18} | — | June 13, 2018 | Mount Lemmon | Mount Lemmon Survey | TIR | 2.1 km | MPC · JPL |
| 872469 | 2018 LQ_{19} | — | June 14, 2018 | Haleakala | Pan-STARRS 2 | H | 350 m | MPC · JPL |
| 872470 | 2018 LW_{19} | — | June 15, 2018 | Haleakala | Pan-STARRS 1 | · | 530 m | MPC · JPL |
| 872471 | 2018 LN_{22} | — | June 8, 2018 | Haleakala | Pan-STARRS 1 | · | 2.1 km | MPC · JPL |
| 872472 | 2018 LQ_{22} | — | June 15, 2018 | Haleakala | Pan-STARRS 1 | TIR | 2.4 km | MPC · JPL |
| 872473 | 2018 LV_{22} | — | June 13, 2018 | Haleakala | Pan-STARRS 1 | PHO | 760 m | MPC · JPL |
| 872474 | 2018 LD_{23} | — | June 5, 2018 | Haleakala | Pan-STARRS 1 | · | 1.8 km | MPC · JPL |
| 872475 | 2018 LH_{23} | — | June 5, 2018 | Haleakala | Pan-STARRS 1 | · | 510 m | MPC · JPL |
| 872476 | 2018 LQ_{23} | — | July 14, 2013 | Haleakala | Pan-STARRS 1 | · | 2.2 km | MPC · JPL |
| 872477 | 2018 LE_{24} | — | June 15, 2018 | Haleakala | Pan-STARRS 1 | · | 2.3 km | MPC · JPL |
| 872478 | 2018 LM_{24} | — | September 14, 1998 | Kitt Peak | Spacewatch | EOS | 1.1 km | MPC · JPL |
| 872479 | 2018 LA_{25} | — | June 5, 2018 | Haleakala | Pan-STARRS 1 | VER | 1.9 km | MPC · JPL |
| 872480 | 2018 LH_{25} | — | June 6, 2018 | Haleakala | Pan-STARRS 1 | · | 2.0 km | MPC · JPL |
| 872481 | 2018 LS_{25} | — | March 7, 2014 | Kitt Peak | Spacewatch | · | 600 m | MPC · JPL |
| 872482 | 2018 LL_{26} | — | June 10, 2018 | Haleakala | Pan-STARRS 1 | · | 570 m | MPC · JPL |
| 872483 | 2018 LR_{26} | — | June 12, 2018 | Haleakala | Pan-STARRS 1 | · | 600 m | MPC · JPL |
| 872484 | 2018 LT_{26} | — | June 15, 2018 | Haleakala | Pan-STARRS 1 | · | 450 m | MPC · JPL |
| 872485 | 2018 LX_{26} | — | June 6, 2018 | Haleakala | Pan-STARRS 1 | · | 470 m | MPC · JPL |
| 872486 | 2018 LZ_{26} | — | June 15, 2018 | Haleakala | Pan-STARRS 1 | · | 460 m | MPC · JPL |
| 872487 | 2018 LJ_{28} | — | June 2, 2018 | Mount Lemmon | Mount Lemmon Survey | · | 2.7 km | MPC · JPL |
| 872488 | 2018 LX_{31} | — | June 11, 2018 | Mount Lemmon | Mount Lemmon Survey | H | 280 m | MPC · JPL |
| 872489 | 2018 LL_{32} | — | June 15, 2018 | Haleakala | Pan-STARRS 1 | L4 · ERY | 5.4 km | MPC · JPL |
| 872490 | 2018 LS_{32} | — | June 8, 2018 | Haleakala | Pan-STARRS 1 | · | 820 m | MPC · JPL |
| 872491 | 2018 LS_{33} | — | June 10, 2018 | Haleakala | Pan-STARRS 1 | · | 1.5 km | MPC · JPL |
| 872492 | 2018 LO_{34} | — | June 10, 2018 | Haleakala | Pan-STARRS 1 | · | 1.8 km | MPC · JPL |
| 872493 | 2018 LW_{35} | — | June 15, 2018 | Haleakala | Pan-STARRS 1 | · | 2.3 km | MPC · JPL |
| 872494 | 2018 LV_{44} | — | June 15, 2018 | Haleakala | Pan-STARRS 1 | · | 410 m | MPC · JPL |
| 872495 | 2018 LO_{45} | — | March 28, 2011 | Mount Lemmon | Mount Lemmon Survey | · | 480 m | MPC · JPL |
| 872496 | 2018 LR_{47} | — | June 6, 2018 | Haleakala | Pan-STARRS 1 | · | 1.7 km | MPC · JPL |
| 872497 | 2018 LX_{47} | — | June 6, 2018 | Haleakala | Pan-STARRS 1 | · | 2.2 km | MPC · JPL |
| 872498 | 2018 LK_{62} | — | June 6, 2018 | Haleakala | Pan-STARRS 1 | · | 2.1 km | MPC · JPL |
| 872499 | 2018 MP_{2} | — | May 28, 2014 | Haleakala | Pan-STARRS 1 | · | 950 m | MPC · JPL |
| 872500 | 2018 MV_{2} | — | October 6, 2008 | Mount Lemmon | Mount Lemmon Survey | · | 2.1 km | MPC · JPL |

== 872501–872600 ==
back to top

| Designation | | | Discovery | | | Properties | | Ref |
| Permanent | Provisional | Named after | Date | Site | Discoverer(s) | Category | Diam. | Ref |
|---|---|---|---|---|---|---|---|---|
| 872501 | 2018 MC_{3} | — | July 16, 2013 | Haleakala | Pan-STARRS 1 | LIX | 2.4 km | MPC · JPL |
| 872502 | 2018 MS_{6} | — | June 18, 2018 | Haleakala | Pan-STARRS 1 | AMO | 250 m | MPC · JPL |
| 872503 | 2018 MA_{9} | — | June 21, 2007 | Mount Lemmon | Mount Lemmon Survey | THB | 2.1 km | MPC · JPL |
| 872504 | 2018 MW_{9} | — | June 18, 2018 | Mount Lemmon | Mount Lemmon Survey | · | 2.4 km | MPC · JPL |
| 872505 | 2018 MX_{9} | — | June 16, 2012 | Haleakala | Pan-STARRS 1 | THB | 2.5 km | MPC · JPL |
| 872506 | 2018 MT_{10} | — | June 21, 2018 | Haleakala | Pan-STARRS 1 | · | 2.1 km | MPC · JPL |
| 872507 | 2018 MN_{11} | — | August 21, 2011 | Haleakala | Pan-STARRS 1 | · | 470 m | MPC · JPL |
| 872508 | 2018 MS_{12} | — | November 18, 2008 | Kitt Peak | Spacewatch | · | 500 m | MPC · JPL |
| 872509 | 2018 MK_{13} | — | June 18, 2018 | Haleakala | Pan-STARRS 1 | L4 | 6.3 km | MPC · JPL |
| 872510 | 2018 MS_{13} | — | June 23, 2018 | Haleakala | Pan-STARRS 1 | VER | 2.0 km | MPC · JPL |
| 872511 | 2018 MN_{14} | — | June 17, 2018 | Haleakala | Pan-STARRS 1 | · | 2.1 km | MPC · JPL |
| 872512 | 2018 MF_{15} | — | June 21, 2018 | Haleakala | Pan-STARRS 1 | L4 | 5.7 km | MPC · JPL |
| 872513 | 2018 MJ_{15} | — | June 16, 2018 | Haleakala | Pan-STARRS 1 | · | 1.4 km | MPC · JPL |
| 872514 | 2018 MZ_{17} | — | June 16, 2018 | Haleakala | Pan-STARRS 1 | L4 | 7.0 km | MPC · JPL |
| 872515 | 2018 ME_{18} | — | November 18, 2008 | Kitt Peak | Spacewatch | · | 670 m | MPC · JPL |
| 872516 | 2018 MU_{18} | — | June 18, 2018 | Haleakala | Pan-STARRS 1 | · | 430 m | MPC · JPL |
| 872517 | 2018 ML_{19} | — | June 17, 2018 | Haleakala | Pan-STARRS 1 | · | 1.5 km | MPC · JPL |
| 872518 | 2018 MW_{20} | — | June 18, 2018 | Haleakala | Pan-STARRS 1 | MAS | 510 m | MPC · JPL |
| 872519 | 2018 MZ_{20} | — | June 16, 2018 | Haleakala | Pan-STARRS 1 | (883) | 440 m | MPC · JPL |
| 872520 | 2018 ML_{21} | — | June 18, 2018 | Mount Lemmon | Mount Lemmon Survey | · | 500 m | MPC · JPL |
| 872521 | 2018 MJ_{22} | — | June 18, 2018 | Kitt Peak | Spacewatch | · | 650 m | MPC · JPL |
| 872522 | 2018 MM_{22} | — | June 18, 2018 | Haleakala | Pan-STARRS 1 | L4 | 6.0 km | MPC · JPL |
| 872523 | 2018 MR_{22} | — | April 23, 2014 | Cerro Tololo | DECam | · | 500 m | MPC · JPL |
| 872524 | 2018 MT_{22} | — | June 16, 2018 | Haleakala | Pan-STARRS 1 | · | 1.6 km | MPC · JPL |
| 872525 | 2018 MW_{22} | — | April 26, 2014 | Cerro Tololo | DECam | · | 500 m | MPC · JPL |
| 872526 | 2018 MD_{23} | — | June 23, 2018 | Haleakala | Pan-STARRS 1 | TIR | 1.8 km | MPC · JPL |
| 872527 | 2018 MY_{23} | — | September 3, 2008 | Kitt Peak | Spacewatch | · | 380 m | MPC · JPL |
| 872528 | 2018 MN_{25} | — | June 16, 2018 | Haleakala | Pan-STARRS 1 | · | 1.9 km | MPC · JPL |
| 872529 | 2018 MV_{28} | — | July 5, 2010 | Kitt Peak | Spacewatch | BRG | 1.2 km | MPC · JPL |
| 872530 | 2018 ME_{33} | — | June 17, 2018 | Haleakala | Pan-STARRS 1 | · | 440 m | MPC · JPL |
| 872531 | 2018 MJ_{35} | — | September 14, 2013 | Mount Lemmon | Mount Lemmon Survey | · | 2.3 km | MPC · JPL |
| 872532 | 2018 MV_{40} | — | June 17, 2018 | Haleakala | Pan-STARRS 1 | · | 2.1 km | MPC · JPL |
| 872533 | 2018 MA_{46} | — | June 17, 2018 | Haleakala | Pan-STARRS 1 | · | 2.0 km | MPC · JPL |
| 872534 | 2018 ND_{5} | — | June 27, 2014 | Haleakala | Pan-STARRS 1 | · | 910 m | MPC · JPL |
| 872535 | 2018 NQ_{7} | — | October 27, 2016 | Mount Lemmon | Mount Lemmon Survey | H | 330 m | MPC · JPL |
| 872536 | 2018 NW_{8} | — | May 13, 2010 | Mount Lemmon | Mount Lemmon Survey | PHO | 690 m | MPC · JPL |
| 872537 | 2018 NE_{9} | — | October 10, 2015 | Haleakala | Pan-STARRS 1 | · | 470 m | MPC · JPL |
| 872538 | 2018 NL_{9} | — | December 23, 2016 | Haleakala | Pan-STARRS 1 | H | 350 m | MPC · JPL |
| 872539 | 2018 NM_{9} | — | January 29, 2016 | Mount Lemmon | Mount Lemmon Survey | · | 1.8 km | MPC · JPL |
| 872540 | 2018 NP_{9} | — | September 28, 2008 | Mount Lemmon | Mount Lemmon Survey | · | 1.7 km | MPC · JPL |
| 872541 | 2018 NS_{10} | — | June 17, 2018 | Haleakala | Pan-STARRS 1 | DOR | 1.6 km | MPC · JPL |
| 872542 | 2018 NS_{12} | — | June 5, 2018 | Haleakala | Pan-STARRS 1 | EUN | 970 m | MPC · JPL |
| 872543 | 2018 NL_{14} | — | August 8, 2004 | Palomar | NEAT | · | 680 m | MPC · JPL |
| 872544 | 2018 NH_{16} | — | July 11, 2018 | Haleakala | Pan-STARRS 1 | THB | 2.0 km | MPC · JPL |
| 872545 | 2018 NY_{17} | — | July 10, 2018 | Haleakala | Pan-STARRS 1 | · | 1.9 km | MPC · JPL |
| 872546 | 2018 NQ_{19} | — | August 14, 2013 | Haleakala | Pan-STARRS 1 | EOS | 1.3 km | MPC · JPL |
| 872547 | 2018 ND_{20} | — | January 26, 2017 | Haleakala | Pan-STARRS 1 | · | 1.4 km | MPC · JPL |
| 872548 | 2018 NW_{21} | — | July 12, 2018 | Haleakala | Pan-STARRS 2 | · | 2.2 km | MPC · JPL |
| 872549 | 2018 NR_{23} | — | July 12, 2018 | Haleakala | Pan-STARRS 1 | · | 730 m | MPC · JPL |
| 872550 | 2018 NC_{24} | — | July 9, 2018 | Haleakala | Pan-STARRS 1 | MAS | 490 m | MPC · JPL |
| 872551 | 2018 NH_{24} | — | July 10, 2018 | Haleakala | Pan-STARRS 1 | · | 780 m | MPC · JPL |
| 872552 | 2018 NM_{24} | — | April 30, 2014 | Haleakala | Pan-STARRS 1 | BAP | 580 m | MPC · JPL |
| 872553 | 2018 NA_{25} | — | July 8, 2018 | Haleakala | Pan-STARRS 1 | LIX | 2.6 km | MPC · JPL |
| 872554 | 2018 NF_{26} | — | July 11, 2018 | Haleakala | Pan-STARRS 1 | · | 560 m | MPC · JPL |
| 872555 | 2018 NO_{26} | — | July 9, 2018 | Haleakala | Pan-STARRS 1 | EUN | 820 m | MPC · JPL |
| 872556 | 2018 ND_{31} | — | July 12, 2018 | Haleakala | Pan-STARRS 1 | V | 490 m | MPC · JPL |
| 872557 | 2018 NQ_{32} | — | July 11, 2018 | Haleakala | Pan-STARRS 1 | · | 490 m | MPC · JPL |
| 872558 | 2018 NU_{32} | — | July 11, 2018 | Haleakala | Pan-STARRS 1 | · | 490 m | MPC · JPL |
| 872559 | 2018 NM_{33} | — | July 12, 2018 | Haleakala | Pan-STARRS 1 | · | 710 m | MPC · JPL |
| 872560 | 2018 NQ_{35} | — | July 13, 2018 | Haleakala | Pan-STARRS 1 | · | 640 m | MPC · JPL |
| 872561 | 2018 NU_{35} | — | May 23, 2014 | Haleakala | Pan-STARRS 1 | BAP | 600 m | MPC · JPL |
| 872562 | 2018 NW_{38} | — | July 8, 2018 | Haleakala | Pan-STARRS 1 | · | 860 m | MPC · JPL |
| 872563 | 2018 NF_{39} | — | July 12, 2018 | Haleakala | Pan-STARRS 1 | · | 650 m | MPC · JPL |
| 872564 | 2018 ND_{40} | — | July 12, 2018 | Haleakala | Pan-STARRS 1 | · | 1.6 km | MPC · JPL |
| 872565 | 2018 NG_{42} | — | July 13, 2018 | Haleakala | Pan-STARRS 1 | · | 2.0 km | MPC · JPL |
| 872566 | 2018 NE_{52} | — | July 12, 2018 | Haleakala | Pan-STARRS 1 | · | 760 m | MPC · JPL |
| 872567 | 2018 ND_{54} | — | April 25, 2014 | Mount Lemmon | Mount Lemmon Survey | · | 490 m | MPC · JPL |
| 872568 | 2018 NA_{57} | — | July 10, 2018 | Haleakala | Pan-STARRS 1 | · | 2.1 km | MPC · JPL |
| 872569 | 2018 NE_{58} | — | November 29, 2014 | Kitt Peak | Spacewatch | · | 2.7 km | MPC · JPL |
| 872570 | 2018 NF_{58} | — | July 4, 2018 | Haleakala | Pan-STARRS 1 | · | 1.5 km | MPC · JPL |
| 872571 | 2018 NR_{59} | — | July 9, 2018 | Haleakala | Pan-STARRS 1 | · | 1.4 km | MPC · JPL |
| 872572 | 2018 NP_{63} | — | April 29, 2012 | Kitt Peak | Spacewatch | · | 1.9 km | MPC · JPL |
| 872573 | 2018 NK_{69} | — | September 24, 2013 | Mount Lemmon | Mount Lemmon Survey | · | 1.8 km | MPC · JPL |
| 872574 | 2018 NW_{81} | — | July 13, 2018 | Haleakala | Pan-STARRS 1 | L4 | 5.9 km | MPC · JPL |
| 872575 | 2018 OH_{2} | — | September 21, 2012 | Mount Lemmon | Mount Lemmon Survey | · | 2.8 km | MPC · JPL |
| 872576 | 2018 OH_{3} | — | July 17, 2018 | Haleakala | Pan-STARRS 2 | H | 390 m | MPC · JPL |
| 872577 | 2018 ON_{3} | — | July 19, 2018 | Haleakala | Pan-STARRS 2 | · | 440 m | MPC · JPL |
| 872578 | 2018 PA_{1} | — | October 24, 2015 | Mount Lemmon | Mount Lemmon Survey | · | 540 m | MPC · JPL |
| 872579 | 2018 PZ_{4} | — | February 15, 2013 | Haleakala | Pan-STARRS 1 | · | 940 m | MPC · JPL |
| 872580 | 2018 PG_{7} | — | August 5, 2018 | Haleakala | Pan-STARRS 1 | · | 470 m | MPC · JPL |
| 872581 | 2018 PN_{12} | — | September 28, 2003 | Kitt Peak | Spacewatch | · | 1.6 km | MPC · JPL |
| 872582 | 2018 PB_{15} | — | August 5, 2018 | Haleakala | Pan-STARRS 1 | BAP | 510 m | MPC · JPL |
| 872583 | 2018 PJ_{18} | — | June 10, 2005 | Kitt Peak | Spacewatch | · | 1.1 km | MPC · JPL |
| 872584 | 2018 PP_{22} | — | January 1, 2008 | Kitt Peak | Spacewatch | · | 330 m | MPC · JPL |
| 872585 | 2018 PR_{22} | — | July 12, 2018 | Haleakala | Pan-STARRS 1 | H | 300 m | MPC · JPL |
| 872586 | 2018 PS_{22} | — | July 12, 2018 | Haleakala | Pan-STARRS 1 | H | 450 m | MPC · JPL |
| 872587 | 2018 PV_{22} | — | February 16, 2015 | Haleakala | Pan-STARRS 1 | H | 320 m | MPC · JPL |
| 872588 | 2018 PX_{22} | — | February 17, 2017 | Haleakala | Pan-STARRS 1 | H | 330 m | MPC · JPL |
| 872589 | 2018 PG_{23} | — | November 28, 2011 | Mount Lemmon | Mount Lemmon Survey | H | 420 m | MPC · JPL |
| 872590 | 2018 PD_{25} | — | November 8, 2013 | Mount Lemmon | Mount Lemmon Survey | · | 1.9 km | MPC · JPL |
| 872591 | 2018 PX_{30} | — | January 17, 2013 | Kitt Peak | Spacewatch | (2076) | 510 m | MPC · JPL |
| 872592 | 2018 PM_{34} | — | September 14, 2007 | Mount Lemmon | Mount Lemmon Survey | THM | 1.7 km | MPC · JPL |
| 872593 | 2018 PA_{35} | — | August 8, 2018 | Haleakala | Pan-STARRS 1 | · | 1.5 km | MPC · JPL |
| 872594 | 2018 PZ_{36} | — | August 8, 2018 | Haleakala | Pan-STARRS 1 | · | 640 m | MPC · JPL |
| 872595 | 2018 PD_{37} | — | April 21, 2014 | Mount Lemmon | Mount Lemmon Survey | · | 510 m | MPC · JPL |
| 872596 | 2018 PU_{38} | — | August 14, 2018 | Haleakala | Pan-STARRS 1 | 615 | 1.3 km | MPC · JPL |
| 872597 | 2018 PK_{39} | — | August 13, 2018 | Haleakala | Pan-STARRS 1 | EOS | 1.5 km | MPC · JPL |
| 872598 | 2018 PP_{39} | — | August 15, 2018 | Haleakala | Pan-STARRS 1 | · | 2.0 km | MPC · JPL |
| 872599 | 2018 PM_{41} | — | August 7, 2018 | Haleakala | Pan-STARRS 1 | · | 1.5 km | MPC · JPL |
| 872600 | 2018 PD_{42} | — | August 13, 2018 | Haleakala | Pan-STARRS 1 | H | 290 m | MPC · JPL |

== 872601–872700 ==
back to top

| Designation | | | Discovery | | | Properties | | Ref |
| Permanent | Provisional | Named after | Date | Site | Discoverer(s) | Category | Diam. | Ref |
|---|---|---|---|---|---|---|---|---|
| 872601 | 2018 PW_{43} | — | August 11, 2018 | Haleakala | Pan-STARRS 1 | · | 1.3 km | MPC · JPL |
| 872602 | 2018 PJ_{44} | — | August 14, 2018 | Haleakala | Pan-STARRS 1 | · | 710 m | MPC · JPL |
| 872603 | 2018 PE_{45} | — | April 23, 2014 | Cerro Tololo | DECam | · | 550 m | MPC · JPL |
| 872604 | 2018 PO_{45} | — | August 6, 2018 | Haleakala | Pan-STARRS 1 | · | 580 m | MPC · JPL |
| 872605 | 2018 PP_{45} | — | August 8, 2018 | Haleakala | Pan-STARRS 1 | · | 490 m | MPC · JPL |
| 872606 | 2018 PV_{45} | — | May 2, 2014 | Cerro Tololo-DECam | DECam | · | 460 m | MPC · JPL |
| 872607 | 2018 PW_{45} | — | August 14, 2018 | Haleakala | Pan-STARRS 1 | H | 320 m | MPC · JPL |
| 872608 | 2018 PB_{46} | — | August 12, 2018 | Haleakala | Pan-STARRS 1 | H | 390 m | MPC · JPL |
| 872609 | 2018 PM_{46} | — | November 17, 2011 | Mount Lemmon | Mount Lemmon Survey | · | 770 m | MPC · JPL |
| 872610 | 2018 PN_{46} | — | May 6, 2016 | Haleakala | Pan-STARRS 1 | · | 2.4 km | MPC · JPL |
| 872611 | 2018 PE_{47} | — | September 9, 2008 | Mount Lemmon | Mount Lemmon Survey | · | 450 m | MPC · JPL |
| 872612 | 2018 PF_{47} | — | August 10, 2007 | Kitt Peak | Spacewatch | · | 610 m | MPC · JPL |
| 872613 | 2018 PP_{50} | — | August 5, 2018 | Haleakala | Pan-STARRS 1 | · | 490 m | MPC · JPL |
| 872614 | 2018 PU_{52} | — | August 7, 2018 | Haleakala | Pan-STARRS 1 | · | 550 m | MPC · JPL |
| 872615 | 2018 PS_{53} | — | August 13, 2018 | Haleakala | Pan-STARRS 1 | · | 810 m | MPC · JPL |
| 872616 | 2018 PQ_{56} | — | August 8, 2018 | Haleakala | Pan-STARRS 1 | (1338) (FLO) | 400 m | MPC · JPL |
| 872617 | 2018 PB_{57} | — | April 24, 2014 | Cerro Tololo | DECam | · | 400 m | MPC · JPL |
| 872618 | 2018 PR_{57} | — | August 15, 2018 | Haleakala | Pan-STARRS 1 | GEF | 920 m | MPC · JPL |
| 872619 | 2018 PX_{57} | — | August 13, 2018 | Haleakala | Pan-STARRS 1 | · | 740 m | MPC · JPL |
| 872620 | 2018 PW_{58} | — | April 10, 2016 | Haleakala | Pan-STARRS 1 | · | 2.1 km | MPC · JPL |
| 872621 | 2018 PS_{59} | — | June 5, 2014 | Haleakala | Pan-STARRS 1 | · | 850 m | MPC · JPL |
| 872622 | 2018 PX_{59} | — | August 8, 2018 | Haleakala | Pan-STARRS 1 | · | 750 m | MPC · JPL |
| 872623 | 2018 PM_{60} | — | August 6, 2018 | Haleakala | Pan-STARRS 1 | · | 2.3 km | MPC · JPL |
| 872624 | 2018 PP_{60} | — | August 7, 2018 | Haleakala | Pan-STARRS 1 | (5) | 710 m | MPC · JPL |
| 872625 | 2018 PD_{61} | — | September 9, 2015 | Haleakala | Pan-STARRS 1 | · | 440 m | MPC · JPL |
| 872626 | 2018 PF_{62} | — | August 7, 2018 | Haleakala | Pan-STARRS 1 | · | 690 m | MPC · JPL |
| 872627 | 2018 PQ_{64} | — | August 7, 2018 | Haleakala | Pan-STARRS 1 | (5) | 920 m | MPC · JPL |
| 872628 | 2018 PH_{65} | — | August 11, 2018 | Haleakala | Pan-STARRS 1 | · | 590 m | MPC · JPL |
| 872629 | 2018 PM_{65} | — | August 11, 2018 | Haleakala | Pan-STARRS 1 | · | 570 m | MPC · JPL |
| 872630 | 2018 PN_{65} | — | August 5, 2018 | Haleakala | Pan-STARRS 1 | · | 2.3 km | MPC · JPL |
| 872631 | 2018 PX_{67} | — | April 4, 2014 | Kitt Peak | Spacewatch | · | 440 m | MPC · JPL |
| 872632 | 2018 PH_{68} | — | August 14, 2018 | Haleakala | Pan-STARRS 1 | · | 1.6 km | MPC · JPL |
| 872633 | 2018 PW_{68} | — | August 12, 2018 | Haleakala | Pan-STARRS 1 | · | 630 m | MPC · JPL |
| 872634 | 2018 PZ_{68} | — | August 13, 2018 | Haleakala | Pan-STARRS 1 | · | 700 m | MPC · JPL |
| 872635 | 2018 PT_{69} | — | February 4, 2017 | Haleakala | Pan-STARRS 1 | · | 560 m | MPC · JPL |
| 872636 | 2018 PH_{70} | — | December 21, 2008 | Kitt Peak | Spacewatch | · | 800 m | MPC · JPL |
| 872637 | 2018 PE_{71} | — | August 15, 2018 | Haleakala | Pan-STARRS 1 | · | 2.2 km | MPC · JPL |
| 872638 | 2018 PP_{74} | — | August 7, 2018 | Haleakala | Pan-STARRS 1 | V | 540 m | MPC · JPL |
| 872639 | 2018 PV_{78} | — | August 7, 2018 | Haleakala | Pan-STARRS 1 | · | 1.3 km | MPC · JPL |
| 872640 | 2018 PE_{87} | — | February 23, 2007 | Mount Lemmon | Mount Lemmon Survey | · | 540 m | MPC · JPL |
| 872641 | 2018 PR_{93} | — | August 23, 2014 | Haleakala | Pan-STARRS 1 | · | 1.5 km | MPC · JPL |
| 872642 | 2018 PW_{99} | — | October 10, 2015 | Haleakala | Pan-STARRS 1 | · | 390 m | MPC · JPL |
| 872643 | 2018 PG_{100} | — | August 8, 2018 | Haleakala | Pan-STARRS 1 | · | 1.5 km | MPC · JPL |
| 872644 | 2018 PU_{101} | — | March 25, 2017 | Mount Lemmon | Mount Lemmon Survey | · | 890 m | MPC · JPL |
| 872645 | 2018 PD_{103} | — | August 13, 2018 | Haleakala | Pan-STARRS 1 | · | 2.3 km | MPC · JPL |
| 872646 | 2018 PA_{106} | — | May 31, 2006 | Mount Lemmon | Mount Lemmon Survey | · | 1.9 km | MPC · JPL |
| 872647 | 2018 PQ_{118} | — | January 13, 2015 | Haleakala | Pan-STARRS 1 | EOS | 1.4 km | MPC · JPL |
| 872648 | 2018 PE_{120} | — | August 7, 2018 | Haleakala | Pan-STARRS 1 | · | 1.4 km | MPC · JPL |
| 872649 | 2018 PG_{145} | — | September 15, 2013 | Haleakala | Pan-STARRS 1 | · | 2.2 km | MPC · JPL |
| 872650 | 2018 QP_{2} | — | September 22, 2009 | Kitt Peak | Spacewatch | · | 1.5 km | MPC · JPL |
| 872651 | 2018 QU_{2} | — | November 29, 2013 | Mount Lemmon | Mount Lemmon Survey | · | 2.5 km | MPC · JPL |
| 872652 | 2018 QF_{3} | — | September 23, 2009 | Mount Lemmon | Mount Lemmon Survey | · | 1.3 km | MPC · JPL |
| 872653 | 2018 QT_{5} | — | November 17, 2014 | Haleakala | Pan-STARRS 1 | GAL | 1.5 km | MPC · JPL |
| 872654 | 2018 QB_{6} | — | July 5, 2005 | Mount Lemmon | Mount Lemmon Survey | · | 1.4 km | MPC · JPL |
| 872655 | 2018 QN_{11} | — | August 22, 2018 | Haleakala | Pan-STARRS 1 | · | 1.6 km | MPC · JPL |
| 872656 | 2018 QY_{13} | — | August 22, 2018 | Haleakala | Pan-STARRS 1 | · | 2.8 km | MPC · JPL |
| 872657 | 2018 QT_{14} | — | August 17, 2018 | Haleakala | Pan-STARRS 1 | · | 440 m | MPC · JPL |
| 872658 | 2018 QV_{15} | — | August 17, 2018 | Haleakala | Pan-STARRS 1 | · | 450 m | MPC · JPL |
| 872659 | 2018 QF_{16} | — | August 21, 2018 | Haleakala | Pan-STARRS 1 | V | 410 m | MPC · JPL |
| 872660 | 2018 QG_{16} | — | August 22, 2018 | Haleakala | Pan-STARRS 1 | PHO | 510 m | MPC · JPL |
| 872661 | 2018 QU_{16} | — | August 18, 2018 | Haleakala | Pan-STARRS 1 | · | 2.6 km | MPC · JPL |
| 872662 | 2018 QG_{17} | — | August 19, 2018 | Haleakala | Pan-STARRS 1 | CLA | 1.2 km | MPC · JPL |
| 872663 | 2018 QV_{17} | — | June 9, 2007 | Kitt Peak | Spacewatch | · | 540 m | MPC · JPL |
| 872664 | 2018 QK_{18} | — | August 21, 2018 | Haleakala | Pan-STARRS 1 | · | 540 m | MPC · JPL |
| 872665 | 2018 QU_{20} | — | August 18, 2018 | Haleakala | Pan-STARRS 1 | · | 1.9 km | MPC · JPL |
| 872666 | 2018 QQ_{24} | — | August 21, 2018 | Haleakala | Pan-STARRS 1 | · | 640 m | MPC · JPL |
| 872667 | 2018 QW_{35} | — | August 18, 2018 | Haleakala | Pan-STARRS 1 | · | 1.9 km | MPC · JPL |
| 872668 | 2018 RH_{8} | — | March 17, 2012 | Mount Lemmon | Mount Lemmon Survey | H | 360 m | MPC · JPL |
| 872669 | 2018 RS_{10} | — | June 14, 2012 | Haleakala | Pan-STARRS 1 | · | 2.7 km | MPC · JPL |
| 872670 | 2018 RJ_{11} | — | October 9, 2013 | Mount Lemmon | Mount Lemmon Survey | · | 2.2 km | MPC · JPL |
| 872671 | 2018 RM_{12} | — | April 6, 2011 | Mount Lemmon | Mount Lemmon Survey | · | 520 m | MPC · JPL |
| 872672 | 2018 RP_{12} | — | July 25, 2001 | Haleakala | NEAT | · | 1.1 km | MPC · JPL |
| 872673 | 2018 RS_{12} | — | September 17, 2002 | Haleakala | NEAT | · | 530 m | MPC · JPL |
| 872674 | 2018 RY_{12} | — | November 21, 2014 | Haleakala | Pan-STARRS 1 | · | 1.2 km | MPC · JPL |
| 872675 | 2018 RB_{13} | — | November 23, 2008 | Kitt Peak | Spacewatch | · | 540 m | MPC · JPL |
| 872676 | 2018 RA_{15} | — | October 9, 2007 | Kitt Peak | Spacewatch | · | 860 m | MPC · JPL |
| 872677 | 2018 RE_{18} | — | August 24, 2001 | Palomar | NEAT | · | 2.5 km | MPC · JPL |
| 872678 | 2018 RH_{18} | — | June 12, 2011 | Mount Lemmon | Mount Lemmon Survey | · | 590 m | MPC · JPL |
| 872679 | 2018 RX_{19} | — | December 1, 2015 | Haleakala | Pan-STARRS 1 | · | 510 m | MPC · JPL |
| 872680 | 2018 RD_{21} | — | July 11, 2018 | Haleakala | Pan-STARRS 1 | · | 1.6 km | MPC · JPL |
| 872681 | 2018 RL_{21} | — | June 22, 2014 | Kitt Peak | Spacewatch | · | 980 m | MPC · JPL |
| 872682 | 2018 RZ_{27} | — | December 11, 2014 | Mount Lemmon | Mount Lemmon Survey | · | 1.3 km | MPC · JPL |
| 872683 | 2018 RY_{28} | — | September 20, 2014 | Haleakala | Pan-STARRS 1 | · | 1.2 km | MPC · JPL |
| 872684 | 2018 RN_{30} | — | November 2, 2013 | Mount Lemmon | Mount Lemmon Survey | · | 1.9 km | MPC · JPL |
| 872685 | 2018 RL_{32} | — | February 10, 2014 | Mount Lemmon | Mount Lemmon Survey | T_{j} (2.93) | 1.8 km | MPC · JPL |
| 872686 | 2018 RY_{35} | — | February 26, 2009 | Catalina | CSS | H | 470 m | MPC · JPL |
| 872687 | 2018 RD_{36} | — | November 22, 2014 | Haleakala | Pan-STARRS 1 | · | 740 m | MPC · JPL |
| 872688 | 2018 RJ_{36} | — | September 20, 2001 | Socorro | LINEAR | · | 2.7 km | MPC · JPL |
| 872689 | 2018 RJ_{40} | — | September 10, 2018 | Mount Lemmon | Mount Lemmon Survey | · | 1.7 km | MPC · JPL |
| 872690 | 2018 RK_{40} | — | September 14, 2007 | Mount Lemmon | Mount Lemmon Survey | · | 670 m | MPC · JPL |
| 872691 | 2018 RR_{40} | — | September 12, 2018 | Mount Lemmon | Mount Lemmon Survey | H | 330 m | MPC · JPL |
| 872692 | 2018 RQ_{42} | — | September 15, 2007 | Mount Lemmon | Mount Lemmon Survey | · | 1.6 km | MPC · JPL |
| 872693 | 2018 RK_{44} | — | November 7, 2015 | Haleakala | Pan-STARRS 1 | · | 540 m | MPC · JPL |
| 872694 | 2018 RN_{45} | — | September 14, 2018 | Mount Lemmon | Mount Lemmon Survey | · | 710 m | MPC · JPL |
| 872695 | 2018 RE_{46} | — | August 18, 2018 | Haleakala | Pan-STARRS 1 | · | 500 m | MPC · JPL |
| 872696 | 2018 RH_{46} | — | September 9, 2018 | Mount Lemmon | Mount Lemmon Survey | · | 1.1 km | MPC · JPL |
| 872697 | 2018 RX_{47} | — | September 10, 2018 | Mount Lemmon | Mount Lemmon Survey | EUN | 870 m | MPC · JPL |
| 872698 | 2018 RG_{48} | — | September 10, 2018 | Mount Lemmon | Mount Lemmon Survey | · | 2.2 km | MPC · JPL |
| 872699 | 2018 RY_{49} | — | September 10, 2018 | Mount Lemmon | Mount Lemmon Survey | · | 1.9 km | MPC · JPL |
| 872700 | 2018 RE_{50} | — | September 12, 2001 | Kitt Peak | Spacewatch | · | 2.3 km | MPC · JPL |

== 872701–872800 ==
back to top

| Designation | | | Discovery | | | Properties | | Ref |
| Permanent | Provisional | Named after | Date | Site | Discoverer(s) | Category | Diam. | Ref |
|---|---|---|---|---|---|---|---|---|
| 872701 | 2018 RA_{51} | — | September 28, 2011 | Kitt Peak | Spacewatch | · | 680 m | MPC · JPL |
| 872702 | 2018 RB_{54} | — | September 15, 2018 | Mount Lemmon | Mount Lemmon Survey | (895) | 2.4 km | MPC · JPL |
| 872703 | 2018 RK_{54} | — | May 1, 2016 | Cerro Tololo | DECam | · | 1.9 km | MPC · JPL |
| 872704 | 2018 RS_{55} | — | August 26, 2003 | Cerro Tololo | Deep Ecliptic Survey | MAS | 470 m | MPC · JPL |
| 872705 | 2018 RN_{56} | — | September 12, 2018 | Mount Lemmon | Mount Lemmon Survey | ERI | 930 m | MPC · JPL |
| 872706 | 2018 RA_{57} | — | September 12, 2018 | Mount Lemmon | Mount Lemmon Survey | V | 420 m | MPC · JPL |
| 872707 | 2018 RY_{57} | — | September 9, 2018 | Mount Lemmon | Mount Lemmon Survey | · | 2.2 km | MPC · JPL |
| 872708 | 2018 RB_{58} | — | September 12, 2018 | Mount Lemmon | Mount Lemmon Survey | · | 720 m | MPC · JPL |
| 872709 | 2018 RL_{58} | — | July 6, 2005 | Siding Spring | SSS | · | 520 m | MPC · JPL |
| 872710 | 2018 RH_{60} | — | September 9, 2018 | Mount Lemmon | Mount Lemmon Survey | ADE | 1.5 km | MPC · JPL |
| 872711 | 2018 RR_{60} | — | September 13, 2018 | Mount Lemmon | Mount Lemmon Survey | EOS | 1.5 km | MPC · JPL |
| 872712 | 2018 RA_{61} | — | September 10, 2018 | Mount Lemmon | Mount Lemmon Survey | H | 330 m | MPC · JPL |
| 872713 | 2018 RX_{61} | — | September 9, 2018 | Mount Lemmon | Mount Lemmon Survey | · | 580 m | MPC · JPL |
| 872714 | 2018 RS_{62} | — | June 29, 2014 | Haleakala | Pan-STARRS 1 | · | 910 m | MPC · JPL |
| 872715 | 2018 RV_{62} | — | September 10, 2018 | Mount Lemmon | Mount Lemmon Survey | H | 340 m | MPC · JPL |
| 872716 | 2018 RX_{62} | — | September 8, 2018 | Mount Lemmon | Mount Lemmon Survey | · | 2.4 km | MPC · JPL |
| 872717 | 2018 RD_{66} | — | September 12, 2018 | Mount Lemmon | Mount Lemmon Survey | · | 1.5 km | MPC · JPL |
| 872718 | 2018 RO_{66} | — | September 9, 2018 | Mount Lemmon | Mount Lemmon Survey | · | 700 m | MPC · JPL |
| 872719 | 2018 RJ_{76} | — | September 9, 2018 | Mount Lemmon | Mount Lemmon Survey | · | 2.5 km | MPC · JPL |
| 872720 | 2018 RQ_{76} | — | September 10, 2018 | Mount Lemmon | Mount Lemmon Survey | · | 2.0 km | MPC · JPL |
| 872721 | 2018 RU_{76} | — | September 7, 2018 | Mount Lemmon | Mount Lemmon Survey | · | 1.7 km | MPC · JPL |
| 872722 | 2018 RX_{83} | — | September 9, 2018 | Mount Lemmon | Mount Lemmon Survey | · | 2.3 km | MPC · JPL |
| 872723 | 2018 RT_{134} | — | September 11, 2018 | Mount Lemmon | Mount Lemmon Survey | · | 870 m | MPC · JPL |
| 872724 | 2018 RU_{134} | — | September 9, 2018 | Mount Lemmon | Mount Lemmon Survey | · | 770 m | MPC · JPL |
| 872725 | 2018 SA | — | March 28, 2015 | Mount Lemmon | Mount Lemmon Survey | · | 370 m | MPC · JPL |
| 872726 | 2018 ST_{6} | — | June 29, 2014 | Mount Lemmon | Mount Lemmon Survey | · | 1.1 km | MPC · JPL |
| 872727 | 2018 SU_{6} | — | January 13, 2011 | Mount Lemmon | Mount Lemmon Survey | · | 560 m | MPC · JPL |
| 872728 | 2018 SO_{8} | — | November 30, 2014 | Mount Lemmon | Mount Lemmon Survey | · | 1.7 km | MPC · JPL |
| 872729 | 2018 SY_{9} | — | November 2, 2013 | Kitt Peak | Spacewatch | · | 1.8 km | MPC · JPL |
| 872730 | 2018 SY_{10} | — | August 24, 2011 | Haleakala | Pan-STARRS 1 | · | 610 m | MPC · JPL |
| 872731 | 2018 SJ_{15} | — | October 14, 2007 | Catalina | CSS | T_{j} (2.92) | 2.5 km | MPC · JPL |
| 872732 | 2018 SM_{17} | — | September 19, 2018 | Haleakala | Pan-STARRS 2 | · | 1.4 km | MPC · JPL |
| 872733 | 2018 SO_{18} | — | September 26, 2011 | Haleakala | Pan-STARRS 1 | · | 530 m | MPC · JPL |
| 872734 | 2018 SU_{18} | — | September 19, 2018 | Haleakala | Pan-STARRS 2 | · | 1.2 km | MPC · JPL |
| 872735 | 2018 SS_{19} | — | September 30, 2018 | Mount Lemmon | Mount Lemmon Survey | · | 630 m | MPC · JPL |
| 872736 | 2018 TM_{4} | — | June 9, 2012 | Haleakala | Pan-STARRS 1 | H | 390 m | MPC · JPL |
| 872737 | 2018 TS_{5} | — | November 22, 2014 | Haleakala | Pan-STARRS 1 | AMO | 180 m | MPC · JPL |
| 872738 | 2018 TY_{10} | — | October 20, 2011 | Kitt Peak | Spacewatch | · | 670 m | MPC · JPL |
| 872739 | 2018 TE_{11} | — | September 18, 2011 | Mount Lemmon | Mount Lemmon Survey | · | 560 m | MPC · JPL |
| 872740 | 2018 TB_{12} | — | September 26, 2011 | Haleakala | Pan-STARRS 1 | · | 560 m | MPC · JPL |
| 872741 | 2018 TJ_{14} | — | October 22, 2009 | Mount Lemmon | Mount Lemmon Survey | · | 1.5 km | MPC · JPL |
| 872742 | 2018 TK_{14} | — | September 19, 2015 | Haleakala | Pan-STARRS 1 | · | 470 m | MPC · JPL |
| 872743 | 2018 TT_{14} | — | October 13, 2018 | Oukaïmeden | C. Rinner | · | 1.8 km | MPC · JPL |
| 872744 | 2018 TG_{19} | — | October 23, 2004 | Kitt Peak | Spacewatch | · | 490 m | MPC · JPL |
| 872745 | 2018 TP_{19} | — | October 6, 2018 | Mount Lemmon | Mount Lemmon Survey | · | 760 m | MPC · JPL |
| 872746 | 2018 TY_{19} | — | September 18, 2001 | Sacramento Peak | SDSS | · | 830 m | MPC · JPL |
| 872747 | 2018 TD_{21} | — | October 5, 2018 | Mount Lemmon | Mount Lemmon Survey | · | 810 m | MPC · JPL |
| 872748 | 2018 TW_{22} | — | July 14, 2013 | Haleakala | Pan-STARRS 1 | · | 1.3 km | MPC · JPL |
| 872749 | 2018 TB_{25} | — | October 2, 2018 | Haleakala | Pan-STARRS 2 | H | 360 m | MPC · JPL |
| 872750 | 2018 TK_{29} | — | October 15, 2018 | Haleakala | Pan-STARRS 2 | · | 1.2 km | MPC · JPL |
| 872751 | 2018 TS_{31} | — | April 18, 2015 | Cerro Tololo | DECam | (895) | 2.3 km | MPC · JPL |
| 872752 | 2018 TS_{34} | — | October 2, 2018 | Haleakala | Pan-STARRS 2 | · | 660 m | MPC · JPL |
| 872753 | 2018 TZ_{34} | — | October 5, 2018 | Haleakala | Pan-STARRS 2 | · | 2.0 km | MPC · JPL |
| 872754 | 2018 TP_{36} | — | January 15, 2015 | Haleakala | Pan-STARRS 1 | · | 1.9 km | MPC · JPL |
| 872755 | 2018 TB_{37} | — | October 3, 2018 | Haleakala | Pan-STARRS 2 | · | 690 m | MPC · JPL |
| 872756 | 2018 TF_{38} | — | October 3, 2018 | Haleakala | Pan-STARRS 2 | MAS | 540 m | MPC · JPL |
| 872757 | 2018 TZ_{38} | — | October 2, 2018 | Haleakala | Pan-STARRS 2 | · | 690 m | MPC · JPL |
| 872758 | 2018 TW_{39} | — | October 10, 2018 | Mount Lemmon | Mount Lemmon Survey | · | 1.5 km | MPC · JPL |
| 872759 | 2018 TS_{40} | — | October 6, 2018 | Mount Lemmon | Mount Lemmon Survey | · | 2.0 km | MPC · JPL |
| 872760 | 2018 TD_{41} | — | October 4, 2018 | Haleakala | Pan-STARRS 2 | · | 1.3 km | MPC · JPL |
| 872761 | 2018 TW_{43} | — | October 6, 2018 | Mount Lemmon | Mount Lemmon Survey | · | 1.2 km | MPC · JPL |
| 872762 | 2018 TC_{45} | — | November 26, 2014 | Haleakala | Pan-STARRS 1 | MIS | 1.7 km | MPC · JPL |
| 872763 | 2018 TC_{47} | — | October 10, 2018 | Haleakala | Pan-STARRS 2 | · | 2.3 km | MPC · JPL |
| 872764 | 2018 UH_{3} | — | July 31, 2001 | Palomar | NEAT | T_{j} (2.95) | 2.0 km | MPC · JPL |
| 872765 | 2018 UY_{7} | — | February 6, 2016 | Haleakala | Pan-STARRS 1 | · | 530 m | MPC · JPL |
| 872766 | 2018 UU_{8} | — | October 4, 2018 | Haleakala | Pan-STARRS 2 | · | 1.8 km | MPC · JPL |
| 872767 | 2018 UY_{8} | — | October 26, 2011 | Haleakala | Pan-STARRS 1 | · | 790 m | MPC · JPL |
| 872768 | 2018 UW_{9} | — | October 9, 2007 | Kitt Peak | Spacewatch | MAS | 500 m | MPC · JPL |
| 872769 | 2018 UV_{12} | — | October 27, 2011 | Mount Lemmon | Mount Lemmon Survey | · | 650 m | MPC · JPL |
| 872770 | 2018 UP_{14} | — | September 8, 2018 | Mount Lemmon | Mount Lemmon Survey | PHO | 750 m | MPC · JPL |
| 872771 | 2018 UR_{18} | — | November 29, 2011 | Kitt Peak | Spacewatch | · | 730 m | MPC · JPL |
| 872772 | 2018 UM_{19} | — | September 3, 2007 | Mount Lemmon | Mount Lemmon Survey | · | 2.0 km | MPC · JPL |
| 872773 | 2018 US_{19} | — | October 16, 2018 | Haleakala | Pan-STARRS 2 | · | 550 m | MPC · JPL |
| 872774 | 2018 UW_{19} | — | October 17, 2018 | Haleakala | Pan-STARRS 2 | · | 1.3 km | MPC · JPL |
| 872775 | 2018 UV_{21} | — | October 10, 2018 | Mount Lemmon | Mount Lemmon Survey | · | 2.1 km | MPC · JPL |
| 872776 | 2018 UT_{23} | — | October 10, 2018 | Mount Lemmon | Mount Lemmon Survey | · | 2.0 km | MPC · JPL |
| 872777 | 2018 UC_{27} | — | January 1, 2014 | Westfield | International Astronomical Search Collaboration | · | 2.0 km | MPC · JPL |
| 872778 | 2018 UL_{27} | — | October 16, 2018 | Haleakala | Pan-STARRS 2 | · | 2.0 km | MPC · JPL |
| 872779 | 2018 UR_{30} | — | May 1, 2016 | Cerro Tololo | DECam | · | 1.0 km | MPC · JPL |
| 872780 | 2018 UU_{31} | — | March 31, 2016 | Haleakala | Pan-STARRS 1 | · | 1.7 km | MPC · JPL |
| 872781 | 2018 UH_{32} | — | September 19, 2011 | Haleakala | Pan-STARRS 1 | · | 610 m | MPC · JPL |
| 872782 | 2018 UH_{33} | — | May 1, 2016 | Cerro Tololo | DECam | · | 1.7 km | MPC · JPL |
| 872783 | 2018 UB_{34} | — | October 18, 2018 | Mount Lemmon | Mount Lemmon Survey | VER | 1.8 km | MPC · JPL |
| 872784 | 2018 UT_{34} | — | October 16, 2018 | Haleakala | Pan-STARRS 2 | · | 2.4 km | MPC · JPL |
| 872785 | 2018 UZ_{34} | — | October 16, 2018 | Haleakala | Pan-STARRS 2 | · | 600 m | MPC · JPL |
| 872786 | 2018 US_{38} | — | October 22, 2018 | Haleakala | Pan-STARRS 2 | · | 1.6 km | MPC · JPL |
| 872787 | 2018 UO_{47} | — | October 18, 2018 | Mount Lemmon | Mount Lemmon Survey | · | 2.0 km | MPC · JPL |
| 872788 | 2018 UQ_{47} | — | October 17, 2018 | Haleakala | Pan-STARRS 2 | · | 2.3 km | MPC · JPL |
| 872789 | 2018 UP_{49} | — | October 17, 2018 | Haleakala | Pan-STARRS 2 | TIR | 1.9 km | MPC · JPL |
| 872790 | 2018 UA_{50} | — | October 17, 2018 | Haleakala | Pan-STARRS 2 | · | 2.1 km | MPC · JPL |
| 872791 | 2018 VJ_{4} | — | June 8, 2015 | Haleakala | Pan-STARRS 1 | H | 430 m | MPC · JPL |
| 872792 | 2018 VF_{7} | — | May 20, 2012 | Haleakala | Pan-STARRS 1 | H | 400 m | MPC · JPL |
| 872793 | 2018 VN_{11} | — | August 27, 2009 | Kitt Peak | Spacewatch | · | 1.1 km | MPC · JPL |
| 872794 | 2018 VT_{11} | — | November 26, 2005 | Kitt Peak | Spacewatch | · | 1.2 km | MPC · JPL |
| 872795 | 2018 VM_{12} | — | November 19, 2003 | Kitt Peak | Spacewatch | · | 880 m | MPC · JPL |
| 872796 | 2018 VR_{13} | — | September 10, 2018 | Mount Lemmon | Mount Lemmon Survey | · | 490 m | MPC · JPL |
| 872797 | 2018 VG_{14} | — | November 9, 2008 | Mount Lemmon | Mount Lemmon Survey | · | 470 m | MPC · JPL |
| 872798 | 2018 VT_{14} | — | August 21, 2018 | Haleakala | Pan-STARRS 1 | · | 620 m | MPC · JPL |
| 872799 | 2018 VP_{17} | — | July 31, 2005 | Palomar | NEAT | · | 1.0 km | MPC · JPL |
| 872800 | 2018 VO_{19} | — | September 14, 2007 | Catalina | CSS | · | 770 m | MPC · JPL |

== 872801–872900 ==
back to top

| Designation | | | Discovery | | | Properties | | Ref |
| Permanent | Provisional | Named after | Date | Site | Discoverer(s) | Category | Diam. | Ref |
|---|---|---|---|---|---|---|---|---|
| 872801 | 2018 VL_{20} | — | August 3, 2014 | Haleakala | Pan-STARRS 1 | PHO | 630 m | MPC · JPL |
| 872802 | 2018 VX_{20} | — | August 18, 2014 | Haleakala | Pan-STARRS 1 | · | 780 m | MPC · JPL |
| 872803 | 2018 VT_{26} | — | August 22, 2018 | Haleakala | Pan-STARRS 1 | · | 1.4 km | MPC · JPL |
| 872804 | 2018 VT_{28} | — | December 14, 2015 | Haleakala | Pan-STARRS 1 | H | 510 m | MPC · JPL |
| 872805 | 2018 VV_{28} | — | January 28, 2004 | Kitt Peak | Spacewatch | NYS | 770 m | MPC · JPL |
| 872806 | 2018 VJ_{29} | — | September 9, 2018 | Mount Lemmon | Mount Lemmon Survey | PHO | 860 m | MPC · JPL |
| 872807 | 2018 VM_{30} | — | September 20, 2003 | Palomar | NEAT | · | 1.5 km | MPC · JPL |
| 872808 | 2018 VT_{30} | — | October 12, 2014 | Mount Lemmon | Mount Lemmon Survey | · | 1.1 km | MPC · JPL |
| 872809 | 2018 VG_{33} | — | December 12, 2014 | Haleakala | Pan-STARRS 1 | EUN | 740 m | MPC · JPL |
| 872810 | 2018 VV_{37} | — | December 21, 2012 | Mount Lemmon | Mount Lemmon Survey | · | 490 m | MPC · JPL |
| 872811 | 2018 VW_{40} | — | September 13, 2007 | Mount Lemmon | Mount Lemmon Survey | · | 700 m | MPC · JPL |
| 872812 | 2018 VN_{41} | — | October 9, 2005 | Kitt Peak | Spacewatch | · | 480 m | MPC · JPL |
| 872813 | 2018 VD_{47} | — | September 28, 2009 | Kitt Peak | Spacewatch | · | 1.1 km | MPC · JPL |
| 872814 | 2018 VS_{48} | — | August 22, 2014 | Haleakala | Pan-STARRS 1 | · | 750 m | MPC · JPL |
| 872815 | 2018 VW_{48} | — | January 22, 2015 | Haleakala | Pan-STARRS 1 | · | 2.4 km | MPC · JPL |
| 872816 | 2018 VT_{49} | — | January 1, 2012 | Mount Lemmon | Mount Lemmon Survey | · | 840 m | MPC · JPL |
| 872817 | 2018 VX_{49} | — | October 11, 1999 | Kitt Peak | Spacewatch | · | 900 m | MPC · JPL |
| 872818 | 2018 VS_{50} | — | October 15, 2013 | Mount Lemmon | Mount Lemmon Survey | · | 1.5 km | MPC · JPL |
| 872819 | 2018 VW_{51} | — | April 20, 2015 | Cerro Tololo-DECam | DECam | · | 1.9 km | MPC · JPL |
| 872820 | 2018 VL_{55} | — | November 26, 2013 | Mount Lemmon | Mount Lemmon Survey | EOS | 1.4 km | MPC · JPL |
| 872821 | 2018 VK_{56} | — | April 30, 2014 | Haleakala | Pan-STARRS 1 | · | 580 m | MPC · JPL |
| 872822 | 2018 VU_{59} | — | November 27, 2014 | Haleakala | Pan-STARRS 1 | · | 930 m | MPC · JPL |
| 872823 | 2018 VY_{59} | — | June 27, 2014 | Haleakala | Pan-STARRS 1 | · | 580 m | MPC · JPL |
| 872824 | 2018 VX_{62} | — | December 3, 2008 | Mount Lemmon | Mount Lemmon Survey | · | 1.3 km | MPC · JPL |
| 872825 | 2018 VS_{65} | — | February 8, 2011 | Mount Lemmon | Mount Lemmon Survey | · | 840 m | MPC · JPL |
| 872826 | 2018 VF_{68} | — | November 9, 2005 | Piszkés-tető | K. Sárneczky | · | 580 m | MPC · JPL |
| 872827 | 2018 VG_{68} | — | September 10, 2018 | Mount Lemmon | Mount Lemmon Survey | · | 1.4 km | MPC · JPL |
| 872828 | 2018 VE_{70} | — | November 27, 2011 | Kitt Peak | Spacewatch | NYS | 720 m | MPC · JPL |
| 872829 | 2018 VM_{70} | — | September 21, 2012 | Mount Lemmon | Mount Lemmon Survey | · | 1.8 km | MPC · JPL |
| 872830 | 2018 VT_{70} | — | April 23, 2014 | Cerro Tololo | DECam | · | 530 m | MPC · JPL |
| 872831 | 2018 VL_{72} | — | November 13, 2002 | Palomar | NEAT | · | 2.7 km | MPC · JPL |
| 872832 | 2018 VM_{72} | — | January 19, 2012 | Haleakala | Pan-STARRS 1 | · | 860 m | MPC · JPL |
| 872833 | 2018 VT_{73} | — | August 20, 2014 | Haleakala | Pan-STARRS 1 | ERI | 940 m | MPC · JPL |
| 872834 | 2018 VY_{75} | — | January 14, 2016 | Haleakala | Pan-STARRS 1 | · | 700 m | MPC · JPL |
| 872835 | 2018 VQ_{76} | — | September 10, 2007 | Kitt Peak | Spacewatch | MAS | 510 m | MPC · JPL |
| 872836 | 2018 VH_{78} | — | August 25, 2003 | Cerro Tololo | Deep Ecliptic Survey | · | 720 m | MPC · JPL |
| 872837 | 2018 VN_{78} | — | August 23, 2014 | Haleakala | Pan-STARRS 1 | · | 680 m | MPC · JPL |
| 872838 | 2018 VS_{78} | — | October 12, 2007 | Anderson Mesa | LONEOS | · | 2.5 km | MPC · JPL |
| 872839 | 2018 VS_{80} | — | September 30, 2003 | Kitt Peak | Spacewatch | · | 920 m | MPC · JPL |
| 872840 | 2018 VG_{81} | — | September 24, 2011 | Mount Lemmon | Mount Lemmon Survey | · | 540 m | MPC · JPL |
| 872841 | 2018 VF_{84} | — | October 10, 2004 | Kitt Peak | Spacewatch | · | 1.6 km | MPC · JPL |
| 872842 | 2018 VJ_{85} | — | February 9, 2016 | Haleakala | Pan-STARRS 1 | PHO | 600 m | MPC · JPL |
| 872843 | 2018 VU_{85} | — | November 4, 2018 | Mount Lemmon | Mount Lemmon Survey | · | 2.1 km | MPC · JPL |
| 872844 | 2018 VR_{89} | — | September 15, 2007 | Mount Lemmon | Mount Lemmon Survey | · | 620 m | MPC · JPL |
| 872845 | 2018 VO_{91} | — | June 29, 2014 | Haleakala | Pan-STARRS 1 | · | 780 m | MPC · JPL |
| 872846 | 2018 VK_{92} | — | October 21, 2009 | Mount Lemmon | Mount Lemmon Survey | · | 1.4 km | MPC · JPL |
| 872847 | 2018 VK_{93} | — | November 3, 2007 | Mount Lemmon | Mount Lemmon Survey | · | 650 m | MPC · JPL |
| 872848 | 2018 VW_{94} | — | January 11, 2016 | Haleakala | Pan-STARRS 1 | V | 430 m | MPC · JPL |
| 872849 | 2018 VV_{95} | — | September 20, 2009 | Mount Lemmon | Mount Lemmon Survey | · | 1.2 km | MPC · JPL |
| 872850 | 2018 VS_{96} | — | August 22, 2014 | Haleakala | Pan-STARRS 1 | MAS | 490 m | MPC · JPL |
| 872851 | 2018 VT_{96} | — | October 28, 2010 | Mount Lemmon | Mount Lemmon Survey | 3:2 | 4.8 km | MPC · JPL |
| 872852 | 2018 VW_{97} | — | October 31, 2007 | Mount Lemmon | Mount Lemmon Survey | · | 700 m | MPC · JPL |
| 872853 | 2018 VA_{100} | — | October 23, 2011 | Kitt Peak | Spacewatch | · | 580 m | MPC · JPL |
| 872854 | 2018 VT_{100} | — | September 30, 2003 | Kitt Peak | Spacewatch | CLA | 1.1 km | MPC · JPL |
| 872855 | 2018 VC_{105} | — | September 13, 2007 | Mount Lemmon | Mount Lemmon Survey | MAS | 450 m | MPC · JPL |
| 872856 | 2018 VR_{106} | — | August 20, 2014 | Haleakala | Pan-STARRS 1 | · | 550 m | MPC · JPL |
| 872857 | 2018 VQ_{108} | — | October 5, 2014 | Mount Lemmon | Mount Lemmon Survey | · | 860 m | MPC · JPL |
| 872858 | 2018 VZ_{109} | — | August 12, 2010 | Kitt Peak | Spacewatch | 3:2 | 3.8 km | MPC · JPL |
| 872859 | 2018 VB_{110} | — | October 14, 2007 | Mount Lemmon | Mount Lemmon Survey | NYS | 780 m | MPC · JPL |
| 872860 | 2018 VP_{111} | — | July 27, 2014 | Haleakala | Pan-STARRS 1 | · | 770 m | MPC · JPL |
| 872861 | 2018 VS_{111} | — | September 24, 2011 | Haleakala | Pan-STARRS 1 | PHO | 810 m | MPC · JPL |
| 872862 | 2018 VY_{111} | — | October 10, 2007 | Mount Lemmon | Mount Lemmon Survey | · | 1.7 km | MPC · JPL |
| 872863 | 2018 VP_{121} | — | November 7, 2018 | Mount Lemmon | Mount Lemmon Survey | · | 2.4 km | MPC · JPL |
| 872864 | 2018 VY_{122} | — | February 18, 2015 | Haleakala | Pan-STARRS 1 | · | 1.2 km | MPC · JPL |
| 872865 | 2018 VD_{123} | — | November 2, 2018 | Haleakala | Pan-STARRS 2 | · | 1.7 km | MPC · JPL |
| 872866 | 2018 VN_{126} | — | November 6, 2018 | Mount Lemmon | Mount Lemmon Survey | H | 380 m | MPC · JPL |
| 872867 | 2018 VY_{130} | — | November 9, 2018 | Haleakala | Pan-STARRS 2 | · | 830 m | MPC · JPL |
| 872868 | 2018 VM_{131} | — | November 9, 2018 | Haleakala | Pan-STARRS 2 | · | 570 m | MPC · JPL |
| 872869 | 2018 VB_{132} | — | November 1, 2018 | Mount Lemmon | Mount Lemmon Survey | · | 2.1 km | MPC · JPL |
| 872870 | 2018 VT_{135} | — | November 5, 2018 | Mount Lemmon | Mount Lemmon Survey | · | 830 m | MPC · JPL |
| 872871 | 2018 VQ_{138} | — | November 5, 2018 | Haleakala | Pan-STARRS 2 | · | 2.2 km | MPC · JPL |
| 872872 | 2018 VR_{138} | — | November 14, 2018 | Haleakala | Pan-STARRS 2 | · | 2.1 km | MPC · JPL |
| 872873 | 2018 VO_{139} | — | November 6, 2018 | Haleakala | Pan-STARRS 2 | · | 1.7 km | MPC · JPL |
| 872874 | 2018 VZ_{139} | — | November 5, 2018 | Haleakala | Pan-STARRS 2 | · | 2.7 km | MPC · JPL |
| 872875 | 2018 VC_{140} | — | March 19, 2015 | Haleakala | Pan-STARRS 1 | · | 2.2 km | MPC · JPL |
| 872876 | 2018 VW_{140} | — | November 9, 2018 | Haleakala | Pan-STARRS 2 | · | 1.4 km | MPC · JPL |
| 872877 | 2018 VP_{143} | — | November 5, 2018 | Haleakala | Pan-STARRS 2 | · | 1.3 km | MPC · JPL |
| 872878 | 2018 VB_{145} | — | December 29, 2014 | Haleakala | Pan-STARRS 1 | · | 1.5 km | MPC · JPL |
| 872879 | 2018 VK_{145} | — | November 7, 2018 | Mount Lemmon | Mount Lemmon Survey | V | 400 m | MPC · JPL |
| 872880 | 2018 VU_{151} | — | November 9, 2018 | Mount Lemmon | Mount Lemmon Survey | · | 2.3 km | MPC · JPL |
| 872881 | 2018 VC_{154} | — | November 2, 2018 | Haleakala | Pan-STARRS 2 | V | 440 m | MPC · JPL |
| 872882 | 2018 VH_{154} | — | September 29, 2014 | Haleakala | Pan-STARRS 1 | SUL | 1.3 km | MPC · JPL |
| 872883 | 2018 VZ_{154} | — | November 11, 2018 | Mount Lemmon | Mount Lemmon Survey | · | 1.9 km | MPC · JPL |
| 872884 | 2018 VH_{156} | — | April 9, 2016 | Haleakala | Pan-STARRS 1 | · | 2.5 km | MPC · JPL |
| 872885 | 2018 VL_{156} | — | May 16, 2005 | Mount Lemmon | Mount Lemmon Survey | THB | 2.5 km | MPC · JPL |
| 872886 | 2018 VY_{160} | — | November 2, 2018 | Mount Lemmon | Mount Lemmon Survey | · | 1.3 km | MPC · JPL |
| 872887 | 2018 VT_{164} | — | March 17, 2004 | Kitt Peak | Spacewatch | · | 960 m | MPC · JPL |
| 872888 | 2018 VM_{183} | — | November 15, 2007 | Mount Lemmon | Mount Lemmon Survey | · | 2.5 km | MPC · JPL |
| 872889 | 2018 WO_{4} | — | September 27, 2009 | Mount Lemmon | Mount Lemmon Survey | · | 960 m | MPC · JPL |
| 872890 | 2018 WQ_{4} | — | November 19, 2007 | Kitt Peak | Spacewatch | · | 720 m | MPC · JPL |
| 872891 | 2018 WV_{6} | — | November 29, 2018 | Mount Lemmon | Mount Lemmon Survey | · | 910 m | MPC · JPL |
| 872892 | 2018 WS_{10} | — | November 17, 2018 | Mount Lemmon | Mount Lemmon Survey | · | 840 m | MPC · JPL |
| 872893 | 2018 WH_{15} | — | November 17, 2018 | Mount Lemmon | Mount Lemmon Survey | · | 1.2 km | MPC · JPL |
| 872894 | 2018 XH | — | December 3, 2018 | ESA OGS | ESA OGS | APO | 140 m | MPC · JPL |
| 872895 | 2018 XD_{3} | — | December 7, 2015 | Haleakala | Pan-STARRS 1 | H | 440 m | MPC · JPL |
| 872896 | 2018 XK_{6} | — | January 9, 2014 | Kitt Peak | Spacewatch | · | 2.3 km | MPC · JPL |
| 872897 | 2018 XS_{13} | — | December 27, 2006 | Kitt Peak | Spacewatch | · | 910 m | MPC · JPL |
| 872898 | 2018 XX_{15} | — | November 30, 2005 | Kitt Peak | Spacewatch | · | 1.0 km | MPC · JPL |
| 872899 | 2018 XS_{16} | — | May 29, 2017 | Mount Lemmon | Mount Lemmon Survey | H | 310 m | MPC · JPL |
| 872900 | 2018 XZ_{17} | — | September 6, 2014 | Mount Lemmon | Mount Lemmon Survey | · | 830 m | MPC · JPL |

== 872901–873000 ==
back to top

| Designation | | | Discovery | | | Properties | | Ref |
| Permanent | Provisional | Named after | Date | Site | Discoverer(s) | Category | Diam. | Ref |
|---|---|---|---|---|---|---|---|---|
| 872901 | 2018 XG_{19} | — | August 25, 2014 | Haleakala | Pan-STARRS 1 | · | 1.1 km | MPC · JPL |
| 872902 | 2018 XK_{19} | — | December 16, 2014 | Haleakala | Pan-STARRS 1 | · | 990 m | MPC · JPL |
| 872903 | 2018 XT_{19} | — | December 11, 2009 | Catalina | CSS | · | 1.4 km | MPC · JPL |
| 872904 | 2018 XU_{19} | — | February 16, 2012 | Haleakala | Pan-STARRS 1 | · | 960 m | MPC · JPL |
| 872905 | 2018 XK_{20} | — | February 10, 2008 | Vail | Observatory, Jarnac | T_{j} (2.93) | 1.5 km | MPC · JPL |
| 872906 | 2018 XZ_{22} | — | June 21, 2017 | Haleakala | Pan-STARRS 1 | H | 320 m | MPC · JPL |
| 872907 | 2018 XH_{25} | — | December 12, 2018 | Haleakala | Pan-STARRS 1 | · | 990 m | MPC · JPL |
| 872908 | 2018 XZ_{26} | — | December 4, 2018 | Mount Lemmon | Mount Lemmon Survey | H | 430 m | MPC · JPL |
| 872909 | 2018 XL_{27} | — | December 14, 2018 | Haleakala | Pan-STARRS 1 | · | 970 m | MPC · JPL |
| 872910 | 2018 XM_{27} | — | December 10, 2018 | Mount Lemmon | Mount Lemmon Survey | BRG | 1.1 km | MPC · JPL |
| 872911 | 2018 XD_{28} | — | December 9, 2018 | Mount Lemmon | Mount Lemmon Survey | · | 1.0 km | MPC · JPL |
| 872912 | 2018 XV_{30} | — | January 18, 2015 | Haleakala | Pan-STARRS 1 | · | 850 m | MPC · JPL |
| 872913 | 2018 XY_{30} | — | August 22, 2017 | Haleakala | Pan-STARRS 1 | EOS | 1.6 km | MPC · JPL |
| 872914 | 2018 XK_{32} | — | December 28, 2013 | Kitt Peak | Spacewatch | EOS | 1.3 km | MPC · JPL |
| 872915 | 2018 YA_{5} | — | December 23, 2018 | Haleakala | Pan-STARRS 1 | · | 1.0 km | MPC · JPL |
| 872916 | 2018 YT_{8} | — | December 16, 2018 | Haleakala | Pan-STARRS 1 | H | 360 m | MPC · JPL |
| 872917 | 2018 YW_{8} | — | December 31, 2018 | Haleakala | Pan-STARRS 1 | · | 870 m | MPC · JPL |
| 872918 | 2018 YJ_{9} | — | December 31, 2018 | Haleakala | Pan-STARRS 1 | · | 1.5 km | MPC · JPL |
| 872919 | 2018 YP_{9} | — | December 18, 2018 | Haleakala | Pan-STARRS 1 | HNS | 820 m | MPC · JPL |
| 872920 | 2018 YO_{13} | — | December 16, 2018 | Haleakala | Pan-STARRS 1 | · | 780 m | MPC · JPL |
| 872921 | 2018 YM_{14} | — | November 15, 2014 | Mount Lemmon | Mount Lemmon Survey | · | 720 m | MPC · JPL |
| 872922 | 2018 YK_{17} | — | December 17, 2018 | Haleakala | Pan-STARRS 1 | VER | 2.1 km | MPC · JPL |
| 872923 | 2018 YS_{21} | — | November 20, 2014 | Mount Lemmon | Mount Lemmon Survey | · | 810 m | MPC · JPL |
| 872924 | 2018 YP_{26} | — | January 15, 2015 | Haleakala | Pan-STARRS 1 | · | 960 m | MPC · JPL |
| 872925 | 2019 AJ | — | November 2, 2015 | Haleakala | Pan-STARRS 1 | H | 550 m | MPC · JPL |
| 872926 | 2019 AF_{1} | — | October 25, 2005 | Mauna Kea | Veillet, C. | H | 310 m | MPC · JPL |
| 872927 | 2019 AC_{2} | — | January 25, 2014 | Haleakala | Pan-STARRS 1 | H | 420 m | MPC · JPL |
| 872928 | 2019 AU_{5} | — | December 16, 2014 | Haleakala | Pan-STARRS 1 | · | 880 m | MPC · JPL |
| 872929 | 2019 AY_{6} | — | May 5, 2014 | Haleakala | Pan-STARRS 1 | H | 530 m | MPC · JPL |
| 872930 | 2019 AY_{10} | — | October 24, 2015 | Haleakala | Pan-STARRS 1 | H | 410 m | MPC · JPL |
| 872931 | 2019 AA_{11} | — | August 10, 2012 | Kitt Peak | Spacewatch | H | 370 m | MPC · JPL |
| 872932 | 2019 AF_{12} | — | January 11, 2019 | Haleakala | Pan-STARRS 1 | AMO | 440 m | MPC · JPL |
| 872933 | 2019 AR_{18} | — | September 18, 2015 | Catalina | CSS | H | 390 m | MPC · JPL |
| 872934 | 2019 AM_{19} | — | October 23, 2009 | Kitt Peak | Spacewatch | · | 1.2 km | MPC · JPL |
| 872935 | 2019 AY_{20} | — | October 5, 2013 | Haleakala | Pan-STARRS 1 | · | 1.2 km | MPC · JPL |
| 872936 | 2019 AR_{23} | — | February 23, 2007 | Kitt Peak | Spacewatch | · | 890 m | MPC · JPL |
| 872937 | 2019 AO_{24} | — | March 2, 2011 | Kitt Peak | Spacewatch | HNS | 880 m | MPC · JPL |
| 872938 | 2019 AA_{28} | — | January 21, 2015 | Haleakala | Pan-STARRS 1 | · | 940 m | MPC · JPL |
| 872939 | 2019 AC_{28} | — | December 2, 2005 | Kitt Peak | Spacewatch | · | 1.3 km | MPC · JPL |
| 872940 | 2019 AW_{28} | — | January 4, 2019 | Mount Lemmon | Mount Lemmon Survey | T_{j} (2.96) | 2.8 km | MPC · JPL |
| 872941 | 2019 AC_{34} | — | December 19, 2014 | Haleakala | Pan-STARRS 1 | (116763) | 1.5 km | MPC · JPL |
| 872942 | 2019 AA_{41} | — | November 2, 2010 | Mount Lemmon | Mount Lemmon Survey | · | 760 m | MPC · JPL |
| 872943 | 2019 AK_{43} | — | December 21, 2014 | Haleakala | Pan-STARRS 1 | · | 1.3 km | MPC · JPL |
| 872944 | 2019 AE_{44} | — | September 14, 2013 | Haleakala | Pan-STARRS 1 | · | 1.2 km | MPC · JPL |
| 872945 | 2019 AW_{44} | — | January 15, 2019 | Haleakala | Pan-STARRS 2 | H | 440 m | MPC · JPL |
| 872946 | 2019 AT_{48} | — | January 8, 2019 | Haleakala | Pan-STARRS 1 | H | 360 m | MPC · JPL |
| 872947 | 2019 AX_{50} | — | January 1, 2019 | Haleakala | Pan-STARRS 1 | H | 410 m | MPC · JPL |
| 872948 | 2019 AG_{51} | — | February 5, 2011 | Haleakala | Pan-STARRS 1 | · | 910 m | MPC · JPL |
| 872949 | 2019 AZ_{51} | — | January 6, 2019 | Haleakala | Pan-STARRS 1 | · | 1.3 km | MPC · JPL |
| 872950 | 2019 AC_{53} | — | January 3, 2019 | Haleakala | Pan-STARRS 1 | · | 1.1 km | MPC · JPL |
| 872951 | 2019 AY_{56} | — | January 7, 2019 | Haleakala | Pan-STARRS 1 | GEF | 810 m | MPC · JPL |
| 872952 | 2019 AK_{60} | — | January 2, 2019 | Haleakala | Pan-STARRS 1 | · | 1.1 km | MPC · JPL |
| 872953 | 2019 AB_{61} | — | January 7, 2019 | Haleakala | Pan-STARRS 1 | · | 1.3 km | MPC · JPL |
| 872954 | 2019 AG_{63} | — | October 27, 2009 | Mount Lemmon | Mount Lemmon Survey | KON | 1.7 km | MPC · JPL |
| 872955 | 2019 AZ_{63} | — | January 12, 2019 | Haleakala | Pan-STARRS 1 | · | 1.8 km | MPC · JPL |
| 872956 | 2019 AA_{64} | — | January 12, 2019 | Haleakala | Pan-STARRS 1 | · | 1.3 km | MPC · JPL |
| 872957 | 2019 AA_{65} | — | January 8, 2019 | Haleakala | Pan-STARRS 1 | H | 380 m | MPC · JPL |
| 872958 | 2019 AG_{65} | — | January 8, 2019 | Mount Lemmon | Mount Lemmon Survey | · | 880 m | MPC · JPL |
| 872959 | 2019 AS_{66} | — | July 25, 2017 | Haleakala | Pan-STARRS 1 | · | 1.2 km | MPC · JPL |
| 872960 | 2019 AY_{66} | — | January 8, 2019 | Haleakala | Pan-STARRS 1 | H | 330 m | MPC · JPL |
| 872961 | 2019 AZ_{68} | — | January 9, 2019 | Haleakala | Pan-STARRS 1 | · | 2.1 km | MPC · JPL |
| 872962 | 2019 AL_{70} | — | January 7, 2019 | Haleakala | Pan-STARRS 1 | · | 520 m | MPC · JPL |
| 872963 | 2019 AD_{71} | — | January 7, 2019 | Haleakala | Pan-STARRS 1 | · | 520 m | MPC · JPL |
| 872964 | 2019 AN_{71} | — | January 14, 2019 | Haleakala | Pan-STARRS 1 | MAS | 470 m | MPC · JPL |
| 872965 | 2019 AW_{73} | — | January 2, 2019 | Haleakala | Pan-STARRS 1 | · | 890 m | MPC · JPL |
| 872966 | 2019 AR_{74} | — | March 7, 2014 | Kitt Peak | Spacewatch | · | 1.7 km | MPC · JPL |
| 872967 | 2019 AV_{81} | — | April 12, 2011 | Mount Lemmon | Mount Lemmon Survey | JUN | 720 m | MPC · JPL |
| 872968 | 2019 AK_{82} | — | August 29, 2006 | Kitt Peak | Spacewatch | · | 800 m | MPC · JPL |
| 872969 | 2019 AA_{83} | — | January 14, 2019 | Haleakala | Pan-STARRS 1 | NYS | 780 m | MPC · JPL |
| 872970 | 2019 AG_{84} | — | January 6, 2019 | Haleakala | Pan-STARRS 1 | · | 2.0 km | MPC · JPL |
| 872971 | 2019 AJ_{88} | — | January 1, 2019 | Haleakala | Pan-STARRS 1 | EUN | 770 m | MPC · JPL |
| 872972 | 2019 AK_{88} | — | January 13, 2019 | Haleakala | Pan-STARRS 1 | HNS | 610 m | MPC · JPL |
| 872973 | 2019 AM_{88} | — | January 9, 2019 | Haleakala | Pan-STARRS 1 | · | 1.3 km | MPC · JPL |
| 872974 | 2019 AQ_{89} | — | January 16, 2015 | Haleakala | Pan-STARRS 1 | · | 700 m | MPC · JPL |
| 872975 | 2019 AS_{90} | — | January 9, 2019 | Mount Lemmon | Mount Lemmon Survey | ADE | 1.4 km | MPC · JPL |
| 872976 | 2019 AV_{91} | — | January 4, 2019 | Haleakala | Pan-STARRS 1 | · | 1.2 km | MPC · JPL |
| 872977 | 2019 AM_{93} | — | January 4, 2019 | Haleakala | Pan-STARRS 1 | EUN | 790 m | MPC · JPL |
| 872978 | 2019 AO_{94} | — | December 22, 2005 | Kitt Peak | Spacewatch | · | 1.1 km | MPC · JPL |
| 872979 | 2019 AB_{97} | — | January 20, 2015 | Kitt Peak | Spacewatch | · | 870 m | MPC · JPL |
| 872980 | 2019 AG_{97} | — | October 26, 2008 | Mount Lemmon | Mount Lemmon Survey | · | 390 m | MPC · JPL |
| 872981 | 2019 AJ_{97} | — | March 14, 2016 | Mount Lemmon | Mount Lemmon Survey | · | 400 m | MPC · JPL |
| 872982 | 2019 AS_{97} | — | January 14, 2019 | Haleakala | Pan-STARRS 1 | · | 1.0 km | MPC · JPL |
| 872983 | 2019 AH_{108} | — | January 2, 2019 | Haleakala | Pan-STARRS 1 | EOS | 1.4 km | MPC · JPL |
| 872984 | 2019 AM_{108} | — | January 28, 2015 | Haleakala | Pan-STARRS 1 | · | 970 m | MPC · JPL |
| 872985 | 2019 AK_{113} | — | September 19, 1998 | Sacramento Peak | SDSS | · | 1.2 km | MPC · JPL |
| 872986 | 2019 AN_{124} | — | November 16, 2014 | Mount Lemmon | Mount Lemmon Survey | · | 660 m | MPC · JPL |
| 872987 | 2019 AS_{139} | — | January 3, 2019 | Haleakala | Pan-STARRS 1 | · | 1.6 km | MPC · JPL |
| 872988 | 2019 AH_{141} | — | January 2, 2019 | Haleakala | Pan-STARRS 1 | · | 900 m | MPC · JPL |
| 872989 | 2019 AL_{141} | — | January 13, 2019 | Haleakala | Pan-STARRS 1 | · | 1.2 km | MPC · JPL |
| 872990 | 2019 AM_{148} | — | January 8, 2019 | Mauna Kea | COIAS | · | 390 m | MPC · JPL |
| 872991 | 2019 BD | — | January 23, 2006 | Kitt Peak | Spacewatch | H | 390 m | MPC · JPL |
| 872992 | 2019 BC_{1} | — | January 19, 2019 | Mount Lemmon | Mount Lemmon Survey | APO · PHA | 320 m | MPC · JPL |
| 872993 | 2019 BD_{4} | — | January 17, 2019 | Haleakala | Pan-STARRS 1 | H | 390 m | MPC · JPL |
| 872994 | 2019 BN_{4} | — | December 4, 2018 | Mount Lemmon | Mount Lemmon Survey | H | 470 m | MPC · JPL |
| 872995 | 2019 BX_{4} | — | February 7, 2011 | Mount Lemmon | Mount Lemmon Survey | H | 440 m | MPC · JPL |
| 872996 | 2019 BB_{10} | — | January 27, 2019 | Haleakala | Pan-STARRS 1 | H | 340 m | MPC · JPL |
| 872997 | 2019 BN_{10} | — | January 16, 2019 | Haleakala | Pan-STARRS 1 | · | 540 m | MPC · JPL |
| 872998 | 2019 BY_{10} | — | January 16, 2019 | Haleakala | Pan-STARRS 1 | PHO | 730 m | MPC · JPL |
| 872999 | 2019 BN_{11} | — | September 24, 2017 | Haleakala | Pan-STARRS 1 | · | 1.1 km | MPC · JPL |
| 873000 | 2019 BR_{11} | — | February 10, 2014 | Mount Lemmon | Mount Lemmon Survey | H | 280 m | MPC · JPL |

back to top

== Meaning of names ==
As minor planet discoveries are confirmed, they are given a permanent number by the IAU's Minor Planet Center (MPC), and the discoverers can then submit names for them, following the IAU's naming conventions. The list below concerns those minor planets in the specified number-range that have received names, and explains the meanings of those names.

Official naming citations of newly named small Solar System bodies are approved and published in a bulletin by IAU's Working Group for Small Bodies Nomenclature (WGSBN). Before May 2021, citations were published in MPC's Minor Planet Circulars for many decades. Recent citations can also be found on the JPL Small-Body Database (SBDB). Until his death in 2016, German astronomer Lutz D. Schmadel compiled these citations into the Dictionary of Minor Planet Names (DMP) and regularly updated the collection.

Based on Paul Herget's The Names of the Minor Planets, Schmadel also researched the unclear origin of numerous asteroids, most of which had been named prior to World War II. This article incorporates text from this source, which is in the public domain: SBDB New namings may only be added to this list below after official publication as the preannouncement of names is condemned. The WGSBN publishes a comprehensive guideline for the naming rules of non-cometary small Solar System bodies.

| Named minor planet | Provisional | This minor planet was named for... | Ref · Catalog |
|---|---|---|---|
| 872236 Carlgrillmair | 2018 CY_{4} | Carl Grillmair, Canadian-American astronomer working at IPAC at Caltech. | IAU · 872236 |
