= List of named minor planets: J =

This is a partial list of named minor planets, containing all those starting with the letter J, as of 9 November 2026. It is ordered in a case-insensitive, alphabetical manner and contains a total of 1,136 entries. Grey minor planets have no article and redirect to the list of minor planets instead (see List of minor planets § Main index).

== J ==
- 12953 Jaapvreeling
- 7470 Jabberwock
- 1942 Jablunka
- 2079 Jacchia
- 571957 Jacekwierzchoś
- 416583 Jacereece
- 11743 Jachowski
- 2625 Jack London
- 34328 Jackalbright
- 30840 Jackalice
- 22707 Jackgrundy
- 4319 Jackierobinson
- 144552 Jackiesue
- 27582 Jackieterrel
- 26938 Jackli
- 56038 Jackmapanje
- 328305 Jackmcdevitt
- 20023 Jackmegas
- 75842 Jackmonahan
- 7749 Jackschmitt
- 2193 Jackson
- 33418 Jacksonweaver
- 28631 Jacktakahashi
- 243320 Jackuipers
- 5111 Jacliff
- 12909 Jaclifford
- 251512 Jacobcollier
- 223912 Jacobeisig
- 12208 Jacobenglander
- 225438 Jacobfirer
- 22730 Jacobhurwitz
- 12040 Jacobi
- 28568 Jacobjohnson
- 615355 Jacobkuiper
- 11772 Jacoblemaire
- 21926 Jacobperry
- 31592 Jacobplaut
- 12645 Jacobrosales
- 19643 Jacobrucker
- 6716 Jacobsen
- 23752 Jacobshapiro
- 5636 Jacobson
- 25869 Jacoby
- 49294 Jacqclairnoëns
- 26424 Jacquelihung
- 1017 Jacqueline
- 47054 Jacquesblamont
- 24102 Jacquescassini
- 345762 Jacquescœur
- 6542 Jacquescousteau
- 18605 Jacqueslaskar
- 37782 Jacquespiccard
- 20395 Jacquet
- 82926 Jacquey
- 33384 Jacyfang
- 20396 Jaemannkyeong
- 333175 Jaen
- 133891 Jaesubhong
- 9696 Jaffe
- 32237 Jagadeesan
- 25927 Jagandelman
- 32242 Jagota
- 5321 Jagras
- 33570 Jagruenstein
- 30830 Jahn
- 9861 Jahreiss
- 19478 Jaimeflores
- 56561 Jaimenomen
- 31504 Jaisonjain
- 29607 Jakehecla
- 34191 Jakhete
- 1893 Jakoba
- 236909 Jakoberwin
- 101811 Jakobkaup
- 18359 Jakobstaude
- 30418 Jakobsteiner
- 202909 Jakoten
- 22732 Jakpor
- 36992 Jakubek
- 20377 Jakubisin
- 591964 Jakucs
- 176884 Jallynsmith
- 4397 Jalopez
- 230736 Jalyhome
- 27449 Jamarkley
- 30039 Jameier
- 2335 James
- 9007 James Bond
- 2634 James Bradley
- 19852 Jamesalbers
- 12108 Jamesaustin
- 32078 Jamesavoldelli
- 14575 Jamesblanc
- 204632 Jamesburch
- 95853 Jamescarpenter
- 30421 Jameschafer
- 134174 Jameschen
- 22139 Jamescox
- 20863 Jamescronk
- 142084 Jamesdaniel
- 58424 Jamesdunlop
- 81822 Jamesearly
- 22421 Jamesedgar
- 32609 Jamesfagan
- 25925 Jamesfenska
- 5625 Jamesferguson
- 117781 Jamesfisher
- 25913 Jamesgreen
- 22136 Jamesharrison
- 10110 Jameshead
- 39791 Jameshesser
- 32405 Jameshill
- 12125 Jamesjones
- 169184 Jameslee
- 55891 Jameslequeux
- 596588 Jamesliebert
- 121540 Jamesmarsh
- 26683 Jamesmccarthy
- 10676 Jamesmcdanell
- 21065 Jamesmelka
- 30558 Jamesoconnor
- 10773 Jamespaton
- 26467 Jamespopper
- 333251 Jamesroberts
- 121656 Jamesrogers
- 30187 Jamesroney
- 12679 Jamessimpson
- 30282 Jamessmith
- 197196 Jamestaylor
- 11332 Jameswatt
- 17926 Jameswu
- 189312 Jameyszalay
- 117657 Jamieelsila
- 7927 Jamiegilmour
- 117388 Jamiemoore
- 20397 Jamierobinson
- 16012 Jamierubin
- 47707 Jamieson
- 389470 Jan
- 12197 Jan-Otto
- 8556 Jana
- 2073 Janáček
- 577754 Janačerbová
- 16169 Janapaty
- 20187 Janapittichová
- 33904 Janardhanan
- 123852 Jánboďa
- 24411 Janches
- 5420 Jancis
- 79645 Jancovici
- 23689 Jancuypers
- 12629 Jandeboer
- 13133 Jandecleir
- 495759 Jandesselberger
- 37736 Jandl
- 8496 Jandlsmith
- 75846 Jandorf
- 39415 Janeausten
- 19630 Janebell
- 117020 Janeconlin
- 28318 Janecox
- 316741 Janefletcher
- 10043 Janegann
- 7175 Janegoodall
- 6083 Janeirabloom
- 6921 Janejacobs
- 19758 Janelcoulson
- 20673 Janelle
- 27314 Janemcdonald
- 22338 Janemojo
- 2028 Janequeo
- 4558 Janesick
- 28465 Janesmyth
- 65191 Janespencer
- 15099 Janestrohm
- 25988 Janesuh
- 48628 Janetfender
- 306257 Janethunten
- 20484 Janetsong
- 33502 Janetwaldeck
- 53910 Jánfischer
- 20401 Janghyunpark
- 27048 Jangong
- 68719 Jangyeongsil
- 12534 Janhoet
- 2324 Janice
- 383 Janina
- 22862 Janinedavis
- 45690 Janiradebaugh
- 33918 Janiscoville
- 790358 Jānisstreičs
- 7849 Janjosefrič
- 20991 Jánkollár
- 6310 Jankonke
- 6589 Jankovich
- 25614 Jankral
- 652410 Janmarszałek
- 13441 Janmerlin
- 32462 Janmitchener
- 230667 Janmlynář
- 73073 Jannaleuty
- 120097 Janniksinner
- 23812 Jannuzi
- 574635 Jánossy
- 31109 Janpalouš
- 49106 Janry
- 30227 Jansensturgeon
- 3301 Jansje
- 1932 Jansky
- 19140 Jansmit
- 94556 Janstarý
- 10586 Jansteen
- 212606 Janulis
- 565184 Janusz
- 9259 Janvanparadijs
- 8049 Janvier
- 10436 Janwillempel
- 20164 Janzajíc
- 10017 Jaotsungi
- 17992 Japellegrino
- 90503 Japhethboyce
- 7796 Járacimrman
- 60008 Jarda
- 33538 Jaredbergen
- 24549 Jaredgoodman
- 20587 Jargoldman
- 1843 Jarmila
- 65688 Jarnac
- 1558 Järnefelt
- 4023 Jarník
- 7829 Jaroff
- 4320 Jarosewich
- 82464 Jaroslavboček
- 1110 Jaroslawa
- 332183 Jaroussky
- 4422 Jarre
- 475080 Jarry
- 17277 Jarrydlevine
- 3353 Jarvis
- 5250 Jas
- 2964 Jaschek
- 280686 Jasevičius
- 90918 Jasinski
- 28494 Jasmine
- 4336 Jasniewicz
- 4114 Jasnorzewska
- 6063 Jason
- 21475 Jasonclain
- 150374 Jasoncook
- 22775 Jasonelloyd
- 31988 Jasonfiacco
- 30206 Jasonfricker
- 121332 Jasonhair
- 209883 Jasonhofgartner
- 34314 Jasonlee
- 128348 Jasonleonard
- 17199 Jasonliu
- 23728 Jasonmorrow
- 17009 Jasonping
- 571398 Jasonrowe
- 18155 Jasonschuler
- 33626 Jasonsmith
- 55399 Jasonsoderblom
- 5620 Jasonwheeler
- 32091 Jasonwu
- 26717 Jasonye
- 48435 Jaspers
- 15568 Jathe
- 6977 Jaucourt
- 25138 Jaumann
- 6262 Javid
- 117387 Javiercerna
- 6192 Javiergorosabel
- 55866 Javiersierra
- 20404 Javiersuarez
- 710231 Jávorkaágoston
- 5516 Jawilliamson
- 12065 Jaworski
- 100267 JAXA
- 92586 Jaxonpowell
- 22575 Jayallen
- 11173 Jayanderson
- 215884 Jayantmurthy
- 25620 Jayaprakash
- 25554 Jayaranjan
- 51431 Jayardee
- 16172 Jayaweera
- 34404 Jaybuddi
- 221923 Jayeff
- 5812 Jayewinkler
- 33571 Jaygupta
- 13212 Jayleno
- 10098 Jaymiematthews
- 22828 Jaynethomp
- 134091 Jaysoncowley
- 129152 Jaystpierre
- 15116 Jaytate
- 17081 Jaytee
- 30109 Jaywilson
- 32128 Jayzussman
- 84011 Jean-Claude
- 1461 Jean-Jacques
- 5235 Jean-Loup
- 9531 Jean-Luc
- 100229 Jeanbailly
- 552784 Jeanbrahier
- 221026 Jeancoester
- 30130 Jeandillman
- 74371 Jeanduprat
- 320942 Jeanette-Jesse
- 232363 Jeanettethorn
- 13115 Jeangodin
- 153333 Jeanhugues
- 27302 Jeankobis
- 16147 Jeanli
- 49439 Jeanlouispala
- 18112 Jeanlucjosset
- 20228 Jeanmarcmari
- 38019 Jeanmariepelt
- 678198 Jeanmariferenbac
- 33241 Jeanmedas
- 20741 Jeanmichelreess
- 58683 Jeanmouette
- 1281 Jeanne
- 114649 Jeanneacker
- 129177 Jeanneeha
- 189930 Jeanneherbert
- 129064 Jeanneladewig
- 27724 Jeannoël
- 14365 Jeanpaul
- 8116 Jeanperrin
- 33487 Jeanpierrerivet
- 2763 Jeans
- 18574 Jeansimon
- 58734 Jeantarde
- 129325 Jedhancock
- 5899 Jedicke
- 8309 Jedidahisler
- 322912 Jedlik
- 776675 Jędrzejewicz
- 23038 Jeffbaughman
- 38431 Jeffbeck
- 3526 Jeffbell
- 357243 Jefferies
- 1934 Jeffers
- 30928 Jefferson
- 99905 Jeffgrossman
- 46277 Jeffhall
- 187283 Jeffhopkins
- 120174 Jeffjenny
- 84447 Jeffkanipe
- 9519 Jeffkeck
- 7657 Jefflarsen
- 117562 Jeffreyferguson
- 22991 Jeffreyklus
- 28813 Jeffreykurtz
- 173649 Jeffreymoore
- 169509 Jeffreyrobbins
- 421774 Jeffreyrose
- 207883 Jeffreytonge
- 22564 Jeffreyxing
- 262295 Jeffrich
- 129982 Jeffseabrook
- 7376 Jefftaylor
- 17884 Jeffthompson
- 55863 Jeffwayne
- 25405 Jeffwidder
- 9564 Jeffwynn
- 14576 Jefholley
- 23691 Jefneve
- 26275 Jefsoulier
- 207420 Jehin
- 3188 Jekabsons
- 20406 Jekanthanga
- 10085 Jekennedy
- 1606 Jekhovsky
- 27096 Jelenalane
- 16179 Jeloka
- 125718 Jemasalomon
- 97512 Jemison
- 117595 Jemmadavidson
- 526 Jena
- 170900 Jendrassik
- 33889 Jengebo
- 22626 Jengordinier
- 17279 Jeniferevans
- 20496 Jeník
- 10581 Jeníkhollan
- 31876 Jenkens
- 28603 Jenkins
- 4504 Jenkinson
- 5588 Jennabelle
- 18163 Jennalewis
- 12209 Jennalynn
- 71482 Jennamarie
- 28924 Jennanncsele
- 31492 Jennarose
- 5168 Jenner
- 20862 Jenngoedhart
- 11190 Jennibell
- 6249 Jennifer
- 28555 Jenniferchan
- 18175 Jenniferchoy
- 30362 Jenniferdean
- 13853 Jenniferfritz
- 5398 Jennifergannon
- 12485 Jenniferharris
- 384584 Jenniferlawrence
- 19448 Jenniferling
- 18923 Jennifersass
- 33927 Jenniferscully
- 10494 Jenniferwest
- 18970 Jenniharper
- 31767 Jennimartin
- 20555 Jennings
- 34452 Jenniparker
- 146268 Jennipolakis
- 42981 Jenniskens
- 32552 Jennithomas
- 32556 Jennivibber
- 13753 Jennivirta
- 607 Jenny
- 19437 Jennyblank
- 10480 Jennyblue
- 128882 Jennydebenedetti
- 33296 Jennylarson
- 27208 Jennyliu
- 21751 Jennytaylor
- 31630 Jennywang
- 75570 Jenőwigner
- 1719 Jens
- 26921 Jensallit
- 3245 Jensch
- 731389 Jensdierks
- 5900 Jensen
- 8861 Jenskandler
- 5427 Jensmartin
- 38423 Jeokjungchogye
- 9871 Jeon
- 12352 Jepejacobsen
- 20316 Jerahalpern
- 34104 Jeremiahpate
- 128586 Jeremias
- 9268 Jeremihschneider
- 132791 Jeremybauman
- 24120 Jeremyblum
- 24019 Jeremygasper
- 10521 Jeremyhansen
- 31978 Jeremyphilip
- 134112 Jeremyralph
- 34324 Jeremyschwartz
- 11774 Jerne
- 13127 Jeroenbrouwers
- 611064 Jeroenstil
- 33544 Jerold
- 1414 Jérôme
- 116903 Jeromeapt
- 221150 Jerryfoote
- 18720 Jerryguo
- 9837 Jerryhorow
- 11548 Jerrylewis
- 25381 Jerrynelson
- 63163 Jerusalem
- 599019 Jerzymadej
- 29447 Jerzyneyman
- 12091 Jesmalmquist
- 16231 Jessberger
- 19570 Jessedouglas
- 25676 Jesseellison
- 31523 Jessemichel
- 11830 Jessenius
- 6758 Jesseowens
- 211375 Jessesteed
- 30268 Jessezhang
- 16088 Jessgoldstein
- 20407 Jessicaagarwal
- 257296 Jessicaamy
- 21407 Jessicabaker
- 97578 Jessicabarnes
- 31503 Jessicahong
- 31511 Jessicakim
- 12215 Jessicalounsbury
- 13320 Jessicamiles
- 19447 Jessicapearl
- 18956 Jessicarnold
- 30063 Jessicashi
- 16203 Jessicastahl
- 541878 Jessicatallulah
- 33414 Jessicatian
- 34180 Jessicayoung
- 10464 Jessie
- 16123 Jessiecheng
- 33699 Jessiegan
- 188808 Jessiewilde
- 34482 Jessikirchner
- 27417 Jessjohnson
- 32234 Jesslihuang
- 29660 Jessmacalpine
- 549 Jessonda
- 21543 Jessop
- 12067 Jeter
- 17160 Jetly
- 45517 Jett
- 544 Jetta
- 7431 Jettaguilar
- 182925 Jevremović
- 6434 Jewitt
- 27132 Ježek
- 145534 Jhongda
- 4760 Jia-xiang
- 26939 Jiachengli
- 25199 Jiahegu
- 10298 Jiangchuanhuang
- 10877 Jiangnan Tianchi
- 31012 Jiangshiyang
- 590666 Jianguo
- 23690 Jiangwenhan
- 2617 Jiangxi
- 48619 Jianli
- 207723 Jiansanjiang
- 129277 Jianxinchen
- 121007 Jiaxingnanhu
- 28607 Jiayipeng
- 61344 Jicakyoryokutai
- 10577 Jihčesmuzeum
- 2080 Jihlava
- 30051 Jihopark
- 2398 Jilin
- 13845 Jillburnett
- 23002 Jillhirsch
- 178987 Jillianredfern
- 13336 Jillpernell
- 21480 Jilltucker
- 27870 Jillwatson
- 2874 Jim Young
- 128038 Jimadams
- 2143 Jimarnold
- 8146 Jimbell
- 26233 Jimbraun
- 14148 Jimchamberlin
- 27431 Jimcole
- 7703 Jimcooney
- 12224 Jimcornell
- 9809 Jimdarwin
- 28661 Jimdickens
- 50717 Jimfox
- 129985 Jimfreemantle
- 111660 Jimgray
- 47708 Jimhamilton
- 128615 Jimharris
- 4738 Jimihendrix
- 23030 Jimkennedy
- 80807 Jimloudon
- 5594 Jimmiller
- 22988 Jimmyhom
- 26508 Jimmylin
- 44016 Jimmypage
- 3407 Jimmysimms
- 27326 Jimobrien
- 8621 Jimparsons
- 17195 Jimrichardson
- 6618 Jimsimons
- 4445 Jimstratton
- 6173 Jimwestphal
- 21406 Jimyang
- 301153 Jinan
- 29618 Jinandrew
- 20408 Jinbeniyama
- 750032 Jinca
- 3515 Jindra
- 14594 Jindrašilhán
- 11141 Jindrawalter
- 118829 Jindřichštreit
- 21873 Jindřichůvhradec
- 21559 Jingyuanluo
- 529828 Jinhuayizhong
- 23283 Jinjuyi
- 13484 Jinnylin
- 24926 Jinpan
- 3088 Jinxiuzhonghua
- 233544 Jinyaqiu
- 100434 Jinyilian
- 10930 Jinyong
- 33528 Jinzeman
- 546844 Jinzhangwei
- 732571 Jipa
- 17694 Jiránek
- 13367 Jiří
- 31324 Jiřímrázek
- 38461 Jiřítrnka
- 10395 Jirkahorn
- 162035 Jirotakahashi
- 190333 Jirous
- 250374 Jírovec
- 133077 Jirsík
- 3395 Jitka
- 33595 Jiwoolee
- 10118 Jiwu
- 4698 Jizera
- 21257 Jižní Čechy
- 2316 Jo-Ann
- 26333 Joachim
- 2677 Joan
- 257084 Joanalcover
- 166974 Joanbinimelis
- 36039 Joandunham
- 170193 Joanguillem
- 306001 Joanllaneras
- 20142 Joannaclark
- 21860 Joannaguy
- 17988 Joannehsieh
- 28092 Joannekear
- 17914 Joannelee
- 27549 Joannemichet
- 87088 Joannewheeler
- 25472 Joanoro
- 18782 Joanrho
- 215044 Joãoalves
- 88470 Joaquinescrig
- 27121 Joardar
- 215463 Jobse
- 25415 Jocelyn
- 25275 Jocelynbell
- 331371 Jockers
- 26411 Jocorbferg
- 317917 Jodelle
- 17744 Jodiefoster
- 31619 Jodietinker
- 129172 Jodizareski
- 7766 Jododaira
- 261690 Jodorowsky
- 4083 Jody
- 8028 Joeengle
- 9775 Joeferguson
- 4989 Joegoldstein
- 15438 Joegotobed
- 5167 Joeharms
- 5034 Joeharrington
- 27301 Joeingalls
- 305661 Joejackson
- 30455 Joelcastro
- 726 Joëlla
- 25160 Joellama
- 8491 Joelle-gilles
- 15076 Joellewis
- 12867 Joëloïc
- 13751 Joelparker
- 46308 Joelsercel
- 7656 Joemontani
- 31451 Joenickell
- 1524 Joensuu
- 294402 Joeorr
- 8794 Joepatterson
- 47620 Joeplassmann
- 58595 Joepollock
- 20009 Joerao
- 12952 Joerivanleeuwen
- 27342 Joescanio
- 276568 Joestübler
- 81859 Joetaylor
- 211376 Joethurston
- 22555 Joevellone
- 20409 Joeychatelain
- 202093 Jogaila
- 8203 Jogolehmann
- 12857 Johandemessie
- 11238 Johanmaurits
- 5494 Johanmohr
- 127 Johanna
- 367228 Johannahaslehner
- 18980 Johannatang
- 21011 Johannaterlinden
- 9300 Johannes
- 15955 Johannesgmunden
- 24337 Johannessen
- 20060 Johannforster
- 562971 Johannhagen
- 20333 Johannhuth
- 12171 Johannink
- 19970 Johannpeter
- 28547 Johannschröter
- 120481 Johannwalter
- 483637 Johanstein
- 16266 Johconnell
- 3726 Johnadams
- 19711 Johnaligawesa
- 47775 Johnanderson
- 136197 Johnandrews
- 20530 Johnayres
- 6830 Johnbackus
- 20307 Johnbarnes
- 4525 Johnbauer
- 15461 Johnbird
- 12140 Johnbolton
- 7993 Johnbridges
- 75837 Johnbriol
- 16901 Johnbrooks
- 11652 Johnbrownlee
- 27533 Johnbrucato
- 26891 Johnbutler
- 31640 Johncaven
- 14163 Johnchapman
- 30007 Johnclarke
- 9618 Johncleese
- 13179 Johncochrane
- 27508 Johncompton
- 3882 Johncox
- 254000 Johncryan
- 249522 Johndailey
- 12195 Johndavidniemann
- 9064 Johndavies
- 31975 Johndean
- 213771 Johndee
- 34289 Johndell
- 24618 Johnduffey
- 281507 Johnellen
- 246861 Johnelwell
- 8581 Johnen
- 5517 Johnerogers
- 6452 Johneuller
- 90308 Johney
- 263844 Johnfarrell
- 6137 Johnfletcher
- 316202 Johnfowler
- 16588 Johngee
- 19638 Johngenereid
- 14002 Johngoodhue
- 30371 Johngorman
- 91199 Johngray
- 21617 Johnhagen
- 29585 Johnhale
- 230434 Johnhanley
- 8073 Johnharmon
- 20314 Johnharrison
- 26924 Johnharvey
- 85200 Johnhault
- 231042 Johnhayes
- 9695 Johnheise
- 142369 Johnhodges
- 21529 Johnjames
- 126749 Johnjones
- 5964 Johnjunkins
- 133774 Johnkidd
- 25294 Johnlaberee
- 5772 Johnlambert
- 33467 Johnlieb
- 107379 Johnlogan
- 90383 Johnloiacono
- 34354 Johnmadland
- 20324 Johnmahoney
- 10503 Johnmarks
- 134081 Johnmarshall
- 6092 Johnmason
- 8810 Johnmcfarland
- 8026 Johnmckay
- 197200 Johnmclaughlin
- 187447 Johnmester
- 7063 Johnmichell
- 6906 Johnmills
- 21707 Johnmoore
- 128523 Johnmuir
- 52008 Johnnaka
- 5558 Johnnapier
- 3252 Johnny
- 10505 Johnnycash
- 8623 Johnnygalecki
- 12413 Johnnyweir
- 22911 Johnpardon
- 9258 Johnpauljones
- 427695 Johnpazder
- 7110 Johnpearse
- 17220 Johnpenna
- 211021 Johnpercin
- 32208 Johnpercy
- 133807 Johnphelps
- 33832 Johnplane
- 7542 Johnpond
- 14119 Johnprince
- 47619 Johnpursch
- 591201 Johnpye
- 20224 Johnrae
- 7290 Johnrather
- 9405 Johnratje
- 8455 Johnrayner
- 14700 Johnreid
- 90463 Johnrichard
- 33210 Johnrobertson
- 52692 Johnscalzi
- 5722 Johnscherrer
- 10056 Johnschroer
- 61190 Johnschutt
- 22029 Johnshaw
- 21619 Johnshopkins
- 5905 Johnson
- 5255 Johnsophie
- 26284 Johnspahn
- 7554 Johnspencer
- 69239 Johnstarling
- 12378 Johnston
- 5065 Johnstone
- 21752 Johnthurmon
- 40919 Johntonry
- 127803 Johnvaneepoel
- 48411 Johnventre
- 31982 Johnwallis
- 21481 Johnwarren
- 129324 Johnweirich
- 33936 Johnwells
- 15009 Johnwheeler
- 31731 Johnwiley
- 28045 Johnwilkins
- 4736 Johnwood
- 5362 Johnyoung
- 22573 Johnzhou
- 90370 Jókaimór
- 899 Jokaste
- 182592 Jolana
- 836 Jole
- 17995 Jolinefan
- 14010 Jomonaomori
- 31480 Jonahbutler
- 841529 Jonahwoodhams
- 21254 Jonan
- 48886 Jonanderson
- 34478 Jonasboukamp
- 603260 Jónáskároly
- 27949 Jonasz
- 2392 Jonathan Murray
- 54402 Jonathanbradshaw
- 33372 Jonathanchung
- 41907 Jonathanford
- 27194 Jonathanli
- 32049 Jonathanma
- 25116 Jonathanwang
- 47785 Jonathanward
- 24131 Jonathuggins
- 248993 Jonava
- 24297 Jonbach
- 129185 Jonburroughs
- 24214 Jonchristo
- 164130 Jonckhèere
- 4764 Joneberhart
- 3152 Jones
- 24215 Jongastel
- 30370 Jongoetz
- 27106 Jongoldman
- 292159 Jongoldstein
- 31460 Jongsowfei
- 26664 Jongwon
- 231379 Jonhandiboe
- 18117 Jonhodge
- 5406 Jonjoseph
- 63788 Jonlarsen
- 7093 Jonleake
- 16166 Jonlii
- 23757 Jonmunoz
- 25250 Jonnapeterson
- 133874 Jonnazucarelli
- 12204 Jonpineau
- 44001 Jonquet
- 25549 Jonsauer
- 22550 Jonsellon
- 116939 Jonstewart
- 5593 Jonsujatha
- 32520 Jontihorner
- 218570 Jonvandegriff
- 26526 Jookayhyun
- 20410 Joosangyou
- 20411 Jooyeongeem
- 24441 Jopek
- 5232 Jordaens
- 26934 Jordancotler
- 37019 Jordansteckloff
- 492112 Jordicamarasa
- 578053 Jordillorca
- 445143 Jordisavall
- 20730 Jorgecarvano
- 17842 Jorgegarcia
- 185579 Jorgejuan
- 13057 Jorgensen
- 4298 Jorgenúnez
- 347940 Jorgezuluaga
- 286842 Joris
- 59199 Jorisbossard
- 471926 Jörmungandr
- 16083 Jórvík
- 84340 Jos
- 33165 Joschhambsch
- 1423 Jose
- 117652 Joséaponte
- 649 Josefa
- 4555 Josefapérez
- 14976 Josefčapek
- 90937 Josefdufek
- 48457 Joseffried
- 66151 Josefhanuš
- 21539 Josefhlávka
- 26896 Josefhudec
- 17625 Joseflada
- 122554 Joséhernández
- 31384 Joséloisestévez
- 124143 Joséluiscorral
- 20412 Josémaríamadiedo
- 266983 Josepbosch
- 771739 Joseph
- 19496 Josephbarone
- 5883 Josephblack
- 578249 Josephcarr
- 22666 Josephchurch
- 20413 Josephdemartini
- 25432 Josepherli
- 134105 Josephfust
- 229004 Josephhall
- 21519 Josephhenry
- 24434 Josephhoscheidt
- 350032 Josephhunt
- 303 Josephina
- 32311 Josephineyu
- 20418 Josephjao
- 23688 Josephjoachim
- 20419 Josephlazio
- 27562 Josephmarcus
- 27845 Josephmeyer
- 121609 Josephnicholas
- 121631 Josephnuth
- 121717 Josephschepis
- 168321 Josephschmidt
- 11976 Josephthurn
- 31680 Josephuitt
- 6304 Josephus Flavius
- 8023 Josephwalker
- 12990 Josetillard
- 18379 Josévandam
- 23329 Josevega
- 236232 Joshalbers
- 20421 Joshelliott
- 8242 Joshemery
- 129186 Joshgrindlay
- 32213 Joshuachoe
- 29605 Joshuacolwell
- 34175 Joshuadong
- 17991 Joshuaegan
- 23808 Joshuahammer
- 22020 Joshuahandal
- 33575 Joshuajacob
- 21862 Joshuajones
- 168531 Joshuakammer
- 12086 Joshualevine
- 333061 Joshuanelson
- 19204 Joshuatree
- 21646 Joshuaturner
- 25025 Joshuavo
- 32121 Joshuazhou
- 28759 Joshwentzel
- 129063 Joshwood
- 305953 Josiedubey
- 246167 Joskohn
- 27521 Josschindler
- 6647 Josse
- 14122 Josties
- 10340 Jostjahn
- 21363 Jotwani
- 12759 Joule
- 79842 Jourdain
- 77441 Jouve
- 32108 Jovanzhang
- 435186 Jovellanos
- 921 Jovita
- 7899 Joya
- 5418 Joyce
- 24509 Joycechai
- 251627 Joyceearl
- 20211 Joycegates
- 30030 Joycekang
- 10134 Joycepenner
- 43574 Joyharjo
- 20376 Joyhines
- 32031 Joyjin
- 26548 Joykutty
- 28638 Joywang
- 23662 Jozankei
- 864997 Józefmaj
- 17611 Jožkakubík
- 39971 József
- 78577 JPL
- 10700 Juanangelviera
- 287829 Juancarlos
- 6810 Juanclariá
- 21045 Juangabriel
- 321480 Juanluiscano
- 20423 Juanluisrizos
- 178256 Juanmi
- 9284 Juansanchez
- 4270 Juanvictoria
- 652 Jubilatrix
- 9781 Jubjubbird
- 9732 Juchnovski
- 948 Jucunda
- 185641 Judd
- 32522 Judiepersons
- 24261 Judilegault
- 664 Judith
- 23155 Judithblack
- 8611 Judithgoldhaber
- 17844 Judson
- 20517 Judycrystal
- 32197 Judylynnpalmer
- 239046 Judysyd
- 20135 Juels
- 139 Juewa
- 6644 Jugaku
- 8649 Juglans
- 2136 Jugta
- 1248 Jugurtha
- 2487 Juhani
- 423380 Juhászárpád
- 238771 Juhászbalázs
- 602922 Juhászgyula
- 9417 Jujiishii
- 4747 Jujo
- 33113 Julabeth
- 9447 Julesbordet
- 11498 Julgeerts
- 89 Julia
- 18026 Juliabaldwin
- 128614 Juliabest
- 12446 Juliabryant
- 8324 Juliadeleón
- 11460 Juliafang
- 20372 Juliafanning
- 37818 Juliamaury
- 2704 Julian Loewe
- 816 Juliana
- 33687 Julianbain
- 20143 Julianegross
- 27323 Julianewman
- 18176 Julianhong
- 20325 Julianoey
- 26522 Juliapoje
- 11382 Juliasitu
- 384582 Juliasmith
- 12586 Juliaspeyer
- 8308 Julie-Mélissa
- 23674 Juliebaker
- 26435 Juliebrisset
- 168211 Juliechapman
- 34418 Juliegodfrey
- 12880 Juliegrady
- 9925 Juliehoskin
- 20776 Juliekrugler
- 37250 Juliemitchell
- 20435 Juliendewit
- 7460 Julienicoles
- 33803 Julienpeloton
- 17439 Juliesan
- 20436 Julienserrecourt
- 33498 Juliesmith
- 202736 Julietclare
- 33501 Juliethompson
- 1285 Julietta
- 58965 Juliettegréco
- 20438 Julievermersch
- 24410 Juliewalker
- 33923 Juliewarren
- 22477 Julimacoraor
- 5996 Julioángel
- 28125 Juliomiguez
- 28739 Julisauer
- 13370 Júliusbreza
- 20725 Juliuscsotonyi
- 76000 Juliuserving
- 221698 Juliusolsen
- 263255 Jultayu
- 755509 Juming
- 21428 Junehokim
- 3766 Junepatterson
- 126905 Junetveekrem
- 9649 Junfukue
- 11518 Jung
- 10103 Jungfrun
- 20439 Junghyunjo
- 210035 Jungli
- 40441 Jungmann
- 19925 Juni
- 6052 Junichi
- 13533 Junili
- 805212 Junkes
- 32527 Junko
- 10182 Junkobiwaki
- 8724 Junkoehara
- 3 Juno
- 8941 Junsaito
- 5073 Junttura
- 32027 Jupitercheng
- 42113 Jura
- 5778 Jurafrance
- 250719 Jurajbardy
- 24976 Jurajtoth
- 17825 Juranitch
- 22429 Jurašek
- 811477 Juravle
- 89818 Jureskvarč
- 3537 Jürgen
- 316527 Jürgenoberst
- 5394 Jurgens
- 4388 Jürgenstock
- 14966 Jurijvega
- 678800 Juška
- 9470 Jussieu
- 27382 Justinbarber
- 21394 Justinbecker
- 11948 Justinehénin
- 17115 Justiniano
- 19593 Justinkoh
- 21401 Justinkovac
- 230631 Justino
- 13585 Justinsmith
- 26666 Justinto
- 34278 Justinxie
- 269 Justitia
- 21747 Justsolomon
- 2799 Justus
- 6041 Juterkilian
- 1183 Jutta
- 25084 Jutzi
- 44011 Juubichi
- 27023 Juuliamoreau
- 352017 Juvarra
- 2818 Juvenalis
- 605 Juvisia
- 48171 Juza
- 289021 Juzeliūnas
- 7905 Juzoitami
- 3878 Jyoumon
- 6022 Jyuro
- 1500 Jyväskylä
back to top

== See also ==
- List of minor planet discoverers
- List of observatory codes
- Meanings of minor planet names § Index
