= 2028 Janequeo =

Main-belt asteroid

Discovery
- Discovered by: C. Torres; S. Cofré
- Discovery site: Cerro El Roble Stn.
- Discovery date: 18 July 1968

Designations
- Named after: Janequeo (or Yanequén) (Mapuche heroine)
- Alternative designations: 1968 OB_{1}
- Minor planet category: main-belt · Flora

Orbital characteristics
- Epoch 4 September 2017 (JD 2458000.5)
- Uncertainty parameter 0
- Observation arc: 47.89 yr (17,491 days)
- Aphelion: 2.5550 AU
- Perihelion: 2.0382 AU
- Semi-major axis: 2.2966 AU
- Eccentricity: 0.1125
- Orbital period (sidereal): 3.48 yr (1,271 days)
- Mean anomaly: 70.128°
- Mean motion: 0° 16^{m} 59.52^{s} / day
- Inclination: 7.9558°
- Longitude of ascending node: 242.80°
- Argument of perihelion: 27.574°

Physical characteristics
- Dimensions: 2.45 km (calculated); 3.201±0.290 km
- Synodic rotation period: 2.480±0.0002 h
- Geometric albedo: 0.24 (assumed); 0.273±0.070
- Spectral type: S
- Absolute magnitude (H): 14.5 · 14.769±0.004 (R) · 14.79±0.38 · 14.8 · 15.22

2028 Janequeo, provisional designation 1968 OB_{1}, is a stony Florian asteroid from the inner regions of the asteroid belt, approximately 3 kilometers in diameter. It was discovered on July 18, 1968, by Chilean astronomers Carlos Torres and S. Cofré at the Cerro El Roble Station of Chile's National Astronomical Observatory. The asteroid named after the indigenous heroine Janequeo (Yanequén).

== Classification and orbit ==
Janequeo is a member of the Flora family, one of the largest collisional populations of stony asteroids. It orbits the Sun in the inner main-belt at a distance of 2.0–2.6 AU once every 3 years and 6 months (1,271 days). Its orbit has an eccentricity of 0.11 and an inclination of 8° with respect to the ecliptic. The body's observation arc begins at the discovering observatory one night after its official discovery observation on 19 July 1968.

== Physical characteristics ==
=== Lightcurves ===
In August 2010, a rotational lightcurve of Janequeo was obtained from photometric observations by astronomers at the Palomar Transient Factory in California. Lightcurve analysis gave a short rotation period of 2.480 hours with a brightness amplitude of 0.27 magnitude (U=2).

=== Diameter and albedo ===
According to the survey carried out by the NEOWISE mission of NASA's Wide-field Infrared Survey Explorer, Janequeo measures 3.201 kilometers in diameter and its surface has an albedo of 0.273. The Collaborative Asteroid Lightcurve Link assumes an albedo of 0.24 – derived from 8 Flora, the largest member and namesake of the Flora family – and calculates a diameter of 2.45 kilometers based on an absolute magnitude of 15.22.

== Naming ==
This minor planet was named after Janequeo (Yanequén), a heroine and leader of the native Mapuche people of Chile. After her husband Huepotaén died in battle against the colonial Spaniards during the Arauco War in the 16th century, she became tribal chief and brought together various rebellious tribes. The approved naming citation was published by the Minor Planet Center on 1 June 1980 (M.P.C. 5359).

== See also ==
- 1992 Galvarino
