= 2741 Valdivia =

Main-belt asteroid

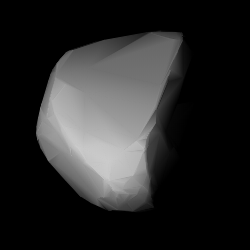
- Shape model of Valdivia from its lightcurve

Discovery
- Discovered by: C. Torres; S. Barros
- Discovery site: Cerro El Roble Stn.
- Discovery date: 1 December 1975

Designations
- Named after: Pedro de Valdivia (Spanish conquistador)
- Alternative designations: 1975 XG · 1935 CM; 1952 DJ_{2} · 1953 QS; 1969 EB_{1} · 1969 FC; 1973 FX_{1} · 1979 UA_{1} 1990 FO_{3}
- Minor planet category: main-belt · (middle)

Orbital characteristics
- Epoch 4 September 2017 (JD 2458000.5)
- Uncertainty parameter 0
- Observation arc: 81.74 yr (29,856 days)
- Aphelion: 3.0836 AU
- Perihelion: 2.1352 AU
- Semi-major axis: 2.6094 AU
- Eccentricity: 0.1817
- Orbital period (sidereal): 4.22 yr (1,540 days)
- Mean anomaly: 142.32°
- Mean motion: 0° 14^{m} 1.68^{s} / day
- Inclination: 10.287°
- Longitude of ascending node: 151.13°
- Argument of perihelion: 91.480°

Physical characteristics
- Mean diameter: 9.13±0.43 km 10.73±0.64 km 11.679±0.172 km 17.52 km (calculated)
- Synodic rotation period: 4.096±0.0005 h 4.096±0.001 h 4.098±0.001 h 8.191±0.0001 h
- Pole ecliptic latitude: (269.0°, −31.0°) (λ_{1}/β_{1}); (103.0°, −59.0°) (λ_{2}/β_{2})
- Geometric albedo: 0.10 (assumed); 0.205±0.035; 0.2052±0.0350; 0.244±0.032; 0.404±0.066
- Spectral type: S/C
- Absolute magnitude (H): 11.764±0.002 (R) · 11.80 · 11.9 · 12.00

2741 Valdivia (prov. designation: 1975 XG) is a background asteroid from the central regions of the asteroid belt, approximately 11 kilometers (6.8 miles) in diameter. It was discovered on 1 December 1975, by Chilean astronomers Carlos Torres and Sergio Barros at the Cerro El Roble Station northwest of Santiago de Chile. The asteroid was named after Spanish conquistador Pedro de Valdivia.

== Orbit and classification ==
Valdivia is a non-family asteroid from the main belt's background population. It orbits the Sun in the central main-belt at a distance of 2.1–3.1 AU once every 4 years and 3 months (1,540 days). Its orbit has an eccentricity of 0.18 and an inclination of 10° with respect to the ecliptic. The asteroid was first observed as 1935 CM at Uccle Observatory in February 1935, where the body's observation arc begins just a two weeks later, or more than 40 years before its official discovery observation at Cerro El Roble.

== Naming ==
This minor planet was named after Spanish conquistador Pedro de Valdivia (1502–1553), who conquered Chile with a small expedition corps after he served under Francisco Pizarro in Peru. Valdivia founded the cities Santiago (1541) and Concepción (1550) and became Chile's first royal governor. The city of Valdivia in southern Chile is also named after him. The official naming citation was published by the Minor Planet Center on 26 March 1986 (M.P.C. 10546).

== Physical characteristics ==
=== Rotation period ===
In August 2016, the so-far best-rated rotational lightcurve of Valdivia was obtained by the Spanish amateur astronomer group OBAS. Lightcurve analysis gave a rotation period of 4.098 hours with a brightness variation of 0.25 magnitude (U=3). Previously, in May 2003, photometric observations made by Donald P. Pray at the Carbuncle Hill Observatory (912) near Providence, Rhode Island, gave a synodic period of 4.096 hours and an amplitude of 0.40 in magnitude (U=2+). In addition astronomers at the Palomar Transient Factory found a period of 4.096 hours with an amplitude of 0.28 om May 2011 (U=2), and French amateur astronomer René Roy obtained a period of 8.1922 hours (twice the period solution) with an amplitude of 0.36 (U=2).

=== Poles ===
In 2016, an international study modeled a lightcurve with a concurring period of 4.09668±0.00005 hours and found two spin axes of (269.0°, −31.0°) and (103.0°, −59.0°) in ecliptic coordinates (λ, β) (U=n.a.).

=== Diameter and albedo ===
According to the survey carried out by the NEOWISE mission of NASA's Wide-field Infrared Survey Explorer, Valdivia measures between 9.13 and 11.679 kilometers in diameter and its surface has an albedo between 0.205 and 0.404, while the Japanese Akari satellite found an albedo of 0.244 and a diameter of 10.73 kilometers. The Collaborative Asteroid Lightcurve Link assumes an albedo of 0.10 – a compromise value between the carbonaceous (0.057) and stony (0.20) asteroids – and calculates a diameter of 17.52 kilometers based on an absolute magnitude of 11.9.
