= 3361 Orpheus =

Apollo asteroid

Discovery
- Discovered by: Carlos Torres
- Discovery site: Cerro El Roble
- Discovery date: 24 April 1982

Designations
- Pronunciation: /ˈɔːrfiːəs, ˈɔːrfjuːs/
- Named after: Orpheus, a legendary Greek bard and prophet
- Alternative designations: 1982 HR
- Minor planet category: PHA
- Adjectives: Orphean (Orphæan) /ɔːrˈfiːən/

Orbital characteristics
- Epoch 13 June 2008 (JD 2454630.5)
- Uncertainty parameter 0
- Observation arc: 11752 days (32.18 yr)
- Aphelion: 1.5999 AU (239.34×10^{6} km)
- Perihelion: 0.81893 AU (122.510×10^{6} km)
- Semi-major axis: 1.2094 AU (180.92×10^{6} km)
- Eccentricity: 0.32288
- Orbital period (sidereal): 1.33 yr (485.82 d)
- Mean anomaly: 283.408°
- Mean motion: 0° 44^{m} 27.636^{s} / day
- Inclination: 2.6849°
- Longitude of ascending node: 189.602°
- Argument of perihelion: 301.651°
- Earth MOID: 0.0139175 AU (2,082,030 km; 1,293,710 mi)

Physical characteristics
- Dimensions: 0.3 km
- Mean radius: 0.15 km
- Synodic rotation period: 3.532 h (0.1472 d)
- Absolute magnitude (H): 19.03

3361 Orpheus (1982 HR) is an Apollo asteroid that was discovered on 24 April 1982 by Carlos Torres at Cerro El Roble Astronomical Station. Its eccentric orbit crosses those of Mars and Earth, and approaches Venus as well. From 1900 to 2100 it passes closer than 0.2 AU (78 LD; 30 million km; 19 million mi) to Venus, 11; Earth, 33; and Mars, 14 times. It passed by Earth at a distance of about 0.03 AU (12 LD; 4.5 million km; 2.8 million mi) in 1937, 1978, 1982, 2021, and 2025.

3361 Orpheus is a potentially hazardous asteroid (PHA) because its minimum orbit intersection distance (MOID) is less than 0.05 AU (19 LD; 7.5 million km; 4.6 million mi) and its diameter is greater than 140 metres (460 ft). The Earth-MOID is 0.0139 AU (5.4 LD; 2.08 million km; 1.29 million mi). With an observation arc of 36 years, the orbit is well-determined for the next several hundred years.

The orbital solution includes non-gravitational forces.

Close approach
Date	JPL SBDB nominal geocentric distance	uncertainty region (3-sigma)
2021-11-21	5768611 km	± 18 km
2198-04-16	3908508 km	± 129 km

== Missions ==
Animation of DART's trajectory DART · 65803 Didymos · Earth · Sun · 2001 CB_{21} · 3361 Orpheus

3361 Orpheus had been one of the originally proposed targets for the Near Earth Asteroid Rendezvous (NEAR) mission.

The proposed AIDA mission's spacecraft, Double Asteroid Redirection Test was a fly-by observation of 3361 Orpheus during its trajectory to asteroid 65803 Didymos but later cancelled.
