= Carlos Torres (astronomer) =

Chilean astronomer

Minor planets discovered: 37
see § List of discovered minor planets

Carlos Torres (1929–2011) was a Chilean astronomer of the University of Chile and an individual member of the International Astronomical Union on several commissions. Between 1968 and 1982, he discovered or co-discovered a number of asteroids from the University of Chile's Cerro El Roble Astronomical Station. Together with Spanish astronomer Carlos Guillermo Torres (1910–1965), he was honored with the naming of asteroid 1769 Carlostorres.

== List of discovered minor planets ==
1973 Colocolo	18 July 1968	list^{[A]}
1974 Caupolican	18 July 1968	list^{[A]}
1992 Galvarino	18 July 1968	list^{[A]}
2028 Janequeo	18 July 1968	list^{[A]}
2282 Andrés Bello	22 March 1974	list
2518 Rutllant	22 March 1974	list
2654 Ristenpart	18 July 1968	list^{[A]}
2741 Valdivia	1 December 1975	list^{[B]}
2784 Domeyko	15 April 1975	list
2858 Carlosporter	1 December 1975	list^{[B]}
2976 Lautaro	22 April 1974	list
3050 Carrera	13 July 1972	list
3361 Orpheus	24 April 1982	list
3922 Heather	26 September 1971	list
3970 Herran	28 June 1979	list

4269 Bogado	22 March 1974	list
4853 Marielukac	28 June 1979	list
4878 Gilhutton	18 July 1968	list^{[A]}
4881 Robmackintosh	1 December 1975	list
5569 Colby	22 March 1974	list
5659 Vergara	18 July 1968	list^{[A]}
6217 Kodai	1 December 1975	list^{[B]}
(6888) 1971 BD3	27 January 1971	list^{[C]}
(6889) 1971 RA	15 September 1971	list^{[C]}
(6940) 1972 HL1	19 April 1972	list
(7045) 1974 FJ	22 March 1974	list
(7151) 1971 SX3	26 September 1971	list
(7975) 1974 FD	22 March 1974	list
(8605) 1968 OH	18 July 1968	list^{[A]}
9917 Keynes	26 June 1979	list

(10993) 1975 XF	1 December 1975	list^{[B]}
(12660) 1975 NC	15 July 1975	list^{[B]}
(16352) 1974 FF	22 March 1974	list
(17350) 1968 OJ	18 July 1968	list^{[A]}
(27655) 1968 OK	18 July 1968	list^{[A]}
(29079) 1975 XD	1 December 1975	list^{[B]}
43722 Carloseduardo	18 July 1968	list^{[A]}
Co-discovery made with:^{A} S. Cofré^{B} S. Barros^{C} J.-M. Petit

== Selected publications ==
- Herbert Wroblewski Cruz, C. Torres, and S. Barros, Minor Planet Positions, Publicaciones Departmento de Astronomia Universidad de Chile, Vol. II, No. 7, pp. 215–244, (1977)
- H. Wroblewski, C. Torres, S. Barros, and Marina Wischnjewsky, Minor planet positions obtained at Cerro Calan Observatory during 1978-1980, Astronomy and Astrophysics Supplement Series, vol. 51, pp. 93–95 (January 1983)
- H. Wroblewski, and C. Torres, New proper-motion stars south of declination -40 deg and right ascension between 00 H and 04 H 30 M, Astronomy and Astrophysics Supplement Series, vol. 78, no. 2, pp. 231–247 (May 1989)
- H. Wroblewski and C. Torres, New proper motion determination of Luyten catalogue stars (LTT) south of declination -40 degrees and right ascension between 00 H and 04 H 30 M, Astronomy and Astrophysics Supplement Series, vol. 83, no. 2, pp. 317–329 (May 1990)
- H. Wroblewski and C. Torres, New proper-motion stars south of declination -40 deg and right ascension between 04h 30m and 16h 00m, Astronomy and Astrophysics Supplement Series, vol. 91, no. 1, pp. 129–169 (November 1991)
- H. Wroblewski and C. Torres, New proper motion determination of Luyten catalogue stars (LTT) south of declination -40 deg and right ascension between 04 H 30 M and 16 H 00 M, Astronomy and Astrophysics Supplement Series, vol. 92, no. 3, pp. 449–472 (February 1992)
- H. Wroblewski and C. Torres, Proper motion LTT stars -5<DE<-30, 0<RA<13h30, VizieR On-line Data Catalog: J/A+AS/128/457
