= Jedicke =

Jedicke may refer to:

- 179P/Jedicke, comet (P/1995 A1)
- 269P/Jedicke, comet (P/1996 A1)
- 5899 Jedicke, asteroid named for the Peter, June and Robert Jedicke
- Peter Jedicke (born 1955), former president of the Royal Astronomical Society of Canada and namesake of 5899 Jedicke
- Robert Jedicke (born 1963), Canadian astronomer and discoverer of comet 179P/Jedicke
