= 84882 Table Mountain =

Main-belt asteroid

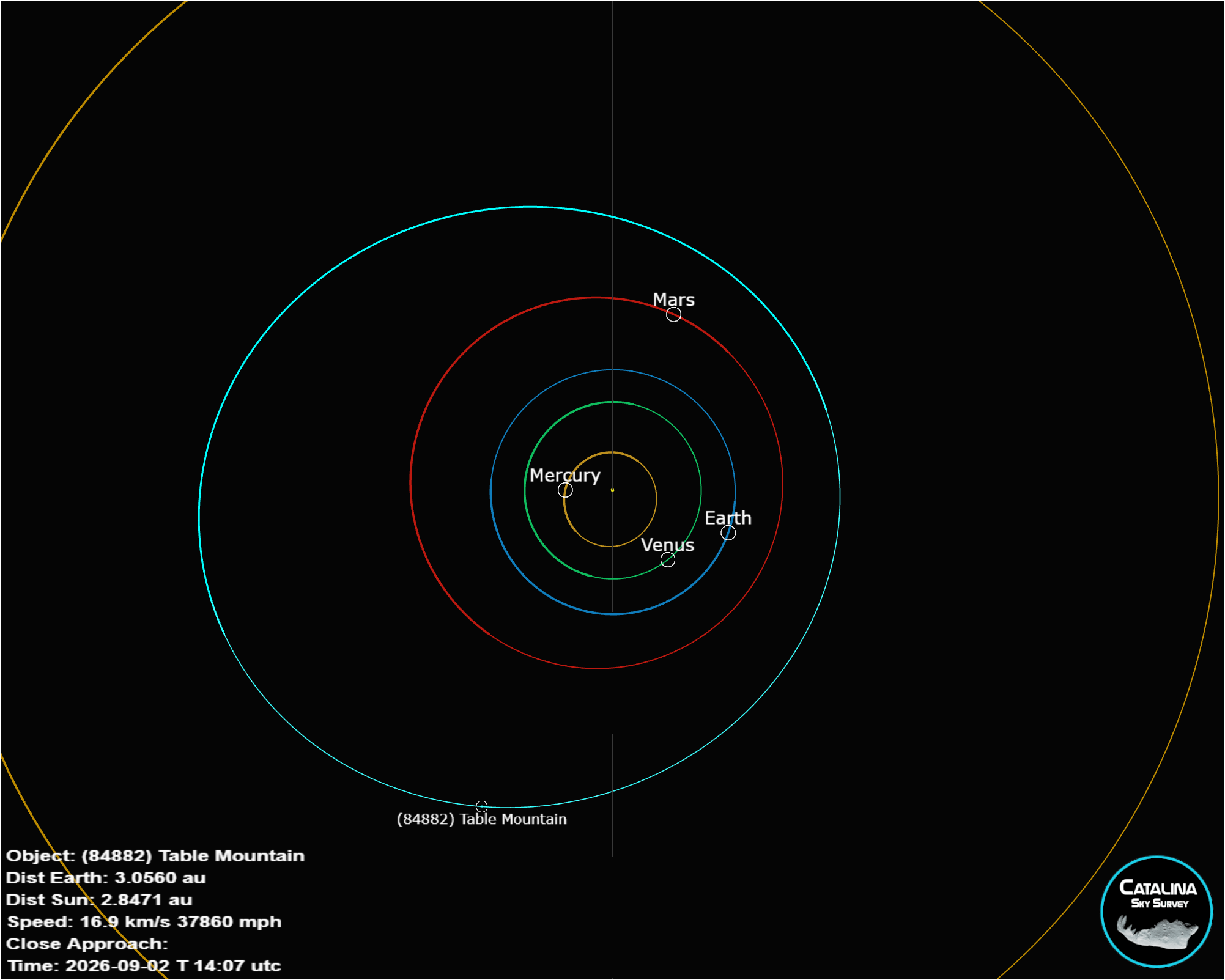
- A diagram of the orbit of (84882) Table Mountain relative to the rest of the Solar System.

Discovery
- Discovered by: J. W. Young
- Discovery site: Table Mountain Obs.
- Discovery date: 1 February 2003

Designations
- Named after: Table Mountain Observatory (discovering observatory)
- Alternative designations: 2003 CN_{16} · 1997 UB_{9}
- Minor planet category: main-belt · (middle) background

Orbital characteristics
- Epoch 27 April 2019 (JD 2458600.5)
- Uncertainty parameter 0
- Observation arc: 20.71 yr (7,565 d)
- Aphelion: 3.4081 AU
- Perihelion: 1.8620 AU
- Semi-major axis: 2.6351 AU
- Eccentricity: 0.2934
- Orbital period (sidereal): 4.28 yr (1,562 d)
- Mean anomaly: 10.961°
- Mean motion: 0° 13^{m} 49.44^{s} / day
- Inclination: 13.857°
- Longitude of ascending node: 20.490°
- Argument of perihelion: 349.84°

Physical characteristics
- Mean diameter: 3.023±3.023 km 3.027±0.563 km
- Geometric albedo: 0.279±0.146; 0.306±0.075
- Spectral type: S/Q (SDSS-MOC)
- Absolute magnitude (H): 14.6

84882 Table Mountain (provisional designation 2003 CN_{16}) is a bright background asteroid from the central region of the asteroid belt, approximately 3 kilometers (1.9 miles) in diameter. It was discovered on 1 February 2003, by American astronomer James Whitney Young at the Table Mountain Observatory near Wrightwood, California. The S/Q-type asteroid was later named after the discovering observatory.

== Orbit and classification ==
Table Mountain is a non-family from the main belt's background population. It orbits the Sun in the central asteroid belt at a distance of 1.9–3.4 AU once every 4 years and 3 months (1,562 days; semi-major axis of 2.64 AU). Its orbit has an eccentricity of 0.29 and an inclination of 14° with respect to the ecliptic. It was first observed as 1997 UB_{9} at Lincoln Laboratory's Experimental Test Site in October 1997, extending the asteroid's observation arc by 6 years prior to its official discovery observation at Table Mountain.

== Naming ==
This minor planet was named for the Table Mountain Observatory, the discoverer's workplace, currently a NASA facility operated by the California Institute of Technology's Jet Propulsion Laboratory, which began operation as a Smithsonian Institution site in 1924 to study the solar constant. In the late 1950s, the site was used to test the first solar panels and is now dedicated to optical astronomy and to study Earth's atmosphere. The official naming citation was published by the Minor Planet Center on 28 October 2004 (M.P.C. 52955).

== Physical characteristics ==
In the SDSS-based taxonomy, Table Mountain has been characterized as both S-type and Q-type asteroid.

=== Diameter and albedo ===
According to the survey carried out by the NEOWISE mission of NASA's Wide-field Infrared Survey Explorer, Table Mountain measures 3.0 kilometers in diameter and its surface has a high albedo between 0.28 and 0.31. As of 2018, no rotational lightcurve of Table Mountain has been obtained from photometric observations. The body's rotation period, pole and shape remain unknown.
