= Elia Millosevich =

Italian astronomer

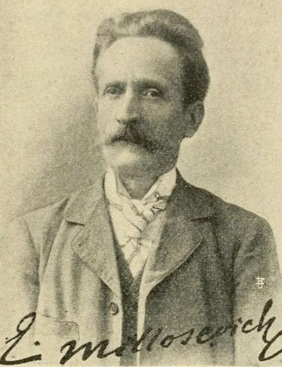
Elia Millosevich (1908)

Asteroids discovered: 2
303 Josephina	12 February 1891
306 Unitas	1 March 1891

Elia Filippo Francesco Giuseppe Maria Millosevich (5 September 1848 in Venice, Austrian Empire – 5 December 1919 in Rome) was an Italian astronomer. He specialized in calculating the orbits of comets and asteroids, in particular 433 Eros.

He first studied at the University of Padua. His first papers, on the then-forthcoming 1874 and 1882 transits of Venus, attracted attention and got him the position of professor of nautical astronomy at the Reale Istituto di Marina Mercantile a Venezia (Venice Royal Institute of the Merchant Navy). In 1879, he was offered the position of deputy director of the Osservatorio del Collegio Romano (Observatory of the Collegio Romano), associated with the Ufficio Centrale di Meteorologia (Central Institute of Meteorology) in Rome, and from 1902 (following Pietro Tacchini's resignation) until his death, he was its director.

For the calculation of the orbit of Eros, in 1898 and 1904 he was awarded the Prize for Astronomy (Premio per l’Astronomia) of the Italian Accademia dei Lincei. In 1911, he was awarded the Pontécoulant Prize (Prix Gustave de Pontécoulant) of the French Académie des sciences de Paris. He published over 450 smaller and larger works, and a large number of single observations of planets and comets.

In 2004, the main-belt asteroid 69961 Millosevich, discovered by the Italian astronomers Piero Sicoli and Francesco Manca, was named in his memory. The naming citation was published on July 13, 2004 (M.P.C. 52326).
