= 1423 Jose =

Main-belt asteroid

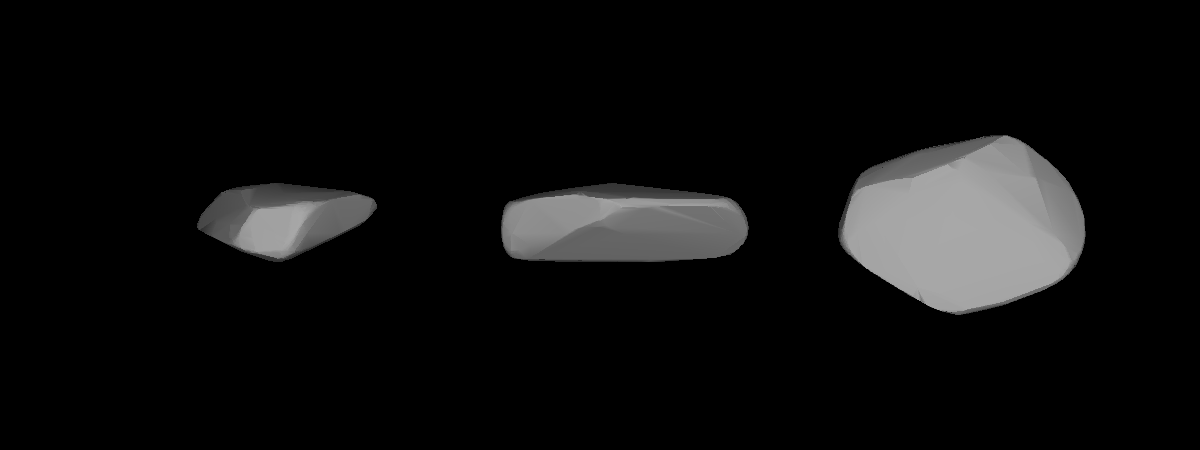
- Lightcurve-based 3D-model of Jose

Discovery
- Discovered by: J. Hunaerts
- Discovery site: Uccle Obs.
- Discovery date: 28 August 1936

Designations
- Named after: Giuseppina, daughter of Giuseppe Bianchi (Italian astronomer)
- Alternative designations: 1936 QM · 1931 TM_{2} 1934 EE · 1936 SC; 1937 YE · 1946 UF; 1950 PW · 1968 HL
- Minor planet category: main-belt · (outer); Koronis

Orbital characteristics
- Epoch 27 April 2019 (JD 2458600.5)
- Uncertainty parameter 0
- Observation arc: 112.39 yr (41,051 d)
- Aphelion: 3.0890 AU
- Perihelion: 2.6318 AU
- Semi-major axis: 2.8604 AU
- Eccentricity: 0.0799
- Orbital period (sidereal): 4.84 yr (1,767 d)
- Mean anomaly: 13.592°
- Mean motion: 0° 12^{m} 13.32^{s} / day
- Inclination: 2.9071°
- Longitude of ascending node: 58.469°
- Argument of perihelion: 321.66°

Physical characteristics
- Mean diameter: 15.81±1.02 km 19.580±0.243 km 20.046±0.117 km 26.14±2.5 km
- Synodic rotation period: 12.307±0.002 h
- Geometric albedo: 0.1632; 0.2814; 0.291; 0.338
- Spectral type: SMASS = S S (SDSS-MOC)
- Absolute magnitude (H): 10.50; 10.80; 10.9

1423 Jose, provisional designation 1936 QM, is a stony asteroid of the Koronis family from the outer regions of the asteroid belt, approximately 20 kilometers (12 miles) in diameter. It was discovered on 28 August 1936, by Belgian astronomer Joseph Hunaerts at the Royal Observatory of Belgium in Uccle. The elongated S-type asteroid has a rotation period of 12.3 hours. It was named for Giuseppina, daughter of Italian astronomer Giuseppe Bianchi.

== Orbit and classification ==
Jose is a core member of the Koronis family (605), a prominent asteroid family with nearly co-planar ecliptical orbits. It orbits the Sun in the outer asteroid belt at a distance of 2.6–3.1 AU once every 4 years and 10 months (1,767 days; semi-major axis of 2.86 AU). Its orbit has an eccentricity of 0.08 and an inclination of 3° with respect to the ecliptic. The asteroid was first imaged on a precovery taken at the Lowell Observatory in June 1906. The body's observation arc begins with its official discovery observation at Uccle in August 1936.

== Naming ==
This minor planet was named by Cesare Lombardi after Giuseppina Bianchi, a daughter of Giuseppe Bianchi who died young. The official naming citation was mentioned in The Names of the Minor Planets by Paul Herget in 1955 (H 128). Lombardi published several studies on the orbit of this asteroid.

== Physical characteristics ==
In the SDSS-based taxonomy, as well as in the SMASS classification, Jose is a common, stony S-type asteroid, which is also the overall spectral type for the members of the Koronis family.

=== Rotation period and pole ===
In November 2004, a rotational lightcurve of Jose was obtained from photometric observations by amateur astronomers Rui Goncalves (938) and Laurent Bernasconi (A14) in Portugal and France, respectively. Lightcurve analysis gave a well-defined rotation period of 12.307±0.002 hours and a brightness variation of 0.68 magnitude (U=3), indicative of a non-spherical, elongated shape.

During an extensive lightcurve survey of Koronian asteroids by visiting American astronomers using the 0.6-m telescope at Mauna Kea Observatory of the Institute for Astronomy in Hawaii during 1997–2005, another period of 12.313±0.003 with an amplitude of 0.80 magnitude was determined (U=3). French amateur astronomer René Roy and the team at the Palomar Transient Factory in California also measured as period of 12.28±0.01 and 12.294±0.0146 with an amplitude of 0.82 and 0.96, respectively (U=2/2). A modeled lightcurve derived from combined dense and sparse photometric data was published in 2013. It gave a concurring period of 12.3127±0.0005 hours and a spin axis at (78.0°, −82.0°) in ecliptic coordinates (λ, β).

=== Diameter and albedo ===
According to the surveys carried out by the Infrared Astronomical Satellite IRAS and the NEOWISE mission of NASA's Wide-field Infrared Survey Explorer, Jose measures between 15.8 and 26.1 kilometers in diameter and its surface has an albedo between 0.16 and 0.34. The Collaborative Asteroid Lightcurve Link derives an albedo of 0.1151 and a diameter of 25.88 kilometers based on an absolute magnitude of 10.9.
