= 303 Josephina =

Main-belt asteroid

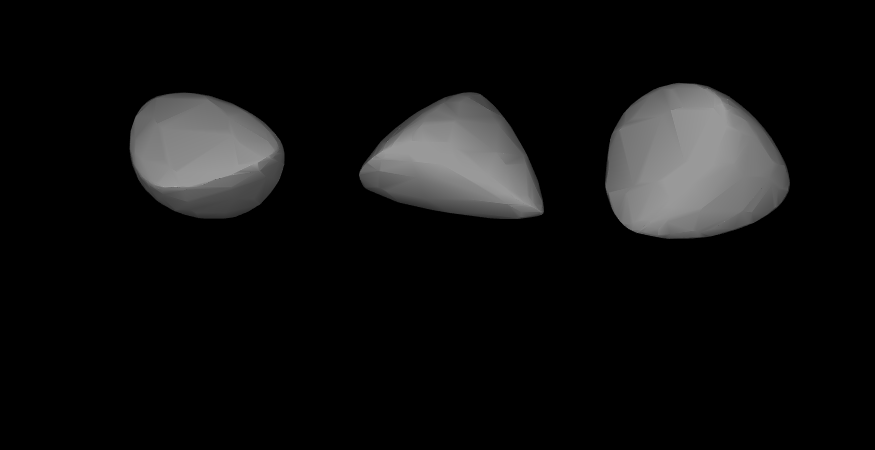
- Lightcurve-base 3D-model of 303 Josephina.

Discovery
- Discovered by: Elia Millosevich
- Discovery date: 12 February 1891

Designations
- Alternative designations: A891 CA; 1948 MA; 1974 KC
- Minor planet category: Main belt

Orbital characteristics
- Epoch 31 July 2016 (JD 2457600.5)
- Uncertainty parameter 0
- Observation arc: 124.85 yr (45600 d)
- Aphelion: 3.31643 AU (496.131 Gm)
- Perihelion: 2.92967 AU (438.272 Gm)
- Semi-major axis: 3.12305 AU (467.202 Gm)
- Eccentricity: 0.061920
- Orbital period (sidereal): 5.52 yr (2015.9 d)
- Mean anomaly: 357.173°
- Mean motion: 0° 10^{m} 42.892^{s} / day
- Inclination: 6.87269°
- Longitude of ascending node: 344.002°
- Argument of perihelion: 64.1014°

Physical characteristics
- Mean diameter: 100.64±7.25 km (composite estimate)
- Mass: (8.8±1.0)×10^{17} kg (Note: Calculated from its standard gravitational parameter GM = 0.059±0.007 km^{3}/s^{2}.)
- Mean density: 0.87 g/cm^{3} (Note: Assuming a diameter of 125 km.)
- Synodic rotation period: 12.497 h (0.5207 d)
- Geometric albedo: 0.0594±0.002
- Temperature: unknown
- Absolute magnitude (H): 8.9

303 Josephina is a large Main belt asteroid. It was discovered by Elia Millosevich on 12 February 1891 in Rome. It was first of his two asteroid discoveries. The other was 306 Unitas.

Orbit diagram

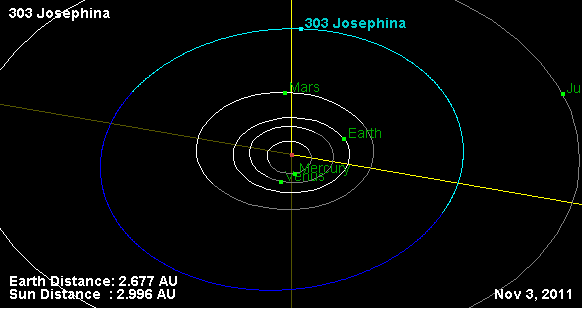
