= 1992 Galvarino =

Stony main-belt asteroid

Discovery
- Discovered by: C. Torres; S. Cofré
- Discovery site: Cerro El Roble Stn.
- Discovery date: 18 July 1968

Designations
- Named after: Galvarino (Mapuche warrior)
- Alternative designations: 1968 OD
- Minor planet category: main-belt · Eos

Orbital characteristics
- Epoch 4 September 2017 (JD 2458000.5)
- Uncertainty parameter 0
- Observation arc: 48.69 yr (17,783 days)
- Aphelion: 3.1367 AU
- Perihelion: 2.8468 AU
- Semi-major axis: 2.9917 AU
- Eccentricity: 0.0485
- Orbital period (sidereal): 5.17 yr (1,890 days)
- Mean anomaly: 197.49°
- Mean motion: 0° 11^{m} 25.8^{s} / day
- Inclination: 10.570°
- Longitude of ascending node: 182.59°
- Argument of perihelion: 98.241°

Physical characteristics
- Dimensions: 9.597±0.105 km 10.24 km (calculated)
- Synodic rotation period: 7.004 h
- Geometric albedo: 0.14 (assumed); 0.145±0.018
- Spectral type: M · L · S
- Absolute magnitude (H): 12.7 · 12.8 · 12.91±0.22

1992 Galvarino, provisional designation 1968 OD, is an Eoan asteroid from the outer region of the asteroid belt, approximately 10 kilometers in diameter.

It was discovered on 18 July 1968, by Chilean astronomers Carlos Torres and S. Cofré at the Cerro El Roble Station of Chile's National Astronomical Observatory, and named after the indigenous warrior Galvarino.

== Classification and orbit ==
Galvarino is a stony S-type asteroid and a member of the Eos family, an orbital group of more than 4,000 asteroids, which are well known for mostly being of stony composition with a relatively high albedo. It is also classified as a M- and L-type asteroids by WISE and PanSTARRS, respectively.

It orbits the Sun in the outer main-belt at a distance of 2.8–3.1 AU once every 5 years and 2 months (1,890 days). Its orbit has an eccentricity of 0.05 and an inclination of 11° with respect to the ecliptic. Its observation arc begins with its official discovery observation in 1968, as no precoveries and no previous identifications were made.

== Physical characteristics ==
As of 2016, a single rotational lightcurve of Galvarino has been obtained. The photometric observations were made in the 1990s, giving a well-defined rotation period of 7.004 hours with a brightness variation of 0.6 magnitude (U=3).

According to the surveys carried out by NASA's WISE satellite with its subsequent NEOWISE mission, the asteroid measures 9.6 kilometers in diameter and its surface has an albedo of 0.145, while the Collaborative Asteroid Lightcurve Link assumes an albedo of 0.14 and calculates a diameter of 10.2 kilometers with an absolute magnitude of 12.7.

== Naming ==
This minor planet was named after the indigenous warrior Galvarino, a heroic figure during the Arauco War, a long-running conflict between colonial Spaniards and the Mapuche people of the 16th century in what is now Chile.

He was condemned by the Spanish soldiers to have his hands cut off and then to be freed as a living lesson to other Indians. Since his request for death was not granted, he promised revenge. He continued to fight the conquerors until recaptured and condemned to the gallows. The approved naming citation was published by the Minor Planet Center on 1 June 1980 (M.P.C. 5358).
