= 2874 Jim Young =

Stony Florian asteroid and slow rotator from the inner regions of the asteroid belt

Discovery
- Discovered by: E. Bowell
- Discovery site: Anderson Mesa Stn.
- Discovery date: 13 October 1982

Designations
- Named after: James Young (American astronomer)
- Alternative designations: 1982 TH · 1962 WE; 1965 SD · 1972 TD_{2} 1972 XF
- Minor planet category: main-belt · Flora

Orbital characteristics
- Epoch 4 September 2017 (JD 2458000.5)
- Uncertainty parameter 0
- Observation arc: 62.99 yr (23,007 days)
- Aphelion: 2.5452 AU
- Perihelion: 1.9444 AU
- Semi-major axis: 2.2448 AU
- Eccentricity: 0.1338
- Orbital period (sidereal): 3.36 yr (1,228 days)
- Mean anomaly: 118.67°
- Mean motion: 0° 17^{m} 34.8^{s} / day
- Inclination: 4.8911°
- Longitude of ascending node: 79.198°
- Argument of perihelion: 322.28°

Physical characteristics
- Dimensions: 6.552±0.099; 6.999±0.044 km 7.47 km (calculated); 7.70±0.43 km
- Synodic rotation period: 131.3 h
- Geometric albedo: 0.1902±0.0435; 0.226±0.042; 0.24 (assumed); 0.251±0.030
- Spectral type: SMASS = S · S
- Absolute magnitude (H): 12.8 · 13.06±0.03 · 13.2

2874 Jim Young, provisional designation 1982 TH, is a stony Florian asteroid and slow rotator from the inner regions of the asteroid belt, approximately 7.5 kilometers in diameter. It was discovered on 13 October 1982, by American astronomer Edward Bowell at Lowell Observatory's Anderson Mesa Station near Flagstaff, Arizona. The asteroid was named after American astronomer James Young.

== Orbit and classification ==
Jim Young is a member of the Flora family, one of the largest groups of stony asteroids in the main-belt. It orbits the Sun in the inner main-belt at a distance of 1.9–2.5 AU once every 3 years and 4 months (1,228 days). Its orbit has an eccentricity of 0.13 and an inclination of 5° with respect to the ecliptic. A first precovery was taken at the Palomar Observatory in 1954, extending the asteroid's observation arc by 28 years prior to its official discovery observation at Anderson Mesa.

== Physical characteristics ==
In the SMASS classification, Jim Young is characterized as a stony S-type asteroid.

=== Slow rotator ===
Jim Young is a slow rotator. These are bodies that take much longer to rotate once around their axis than most other asteroids typically do. In January 2007, a rotational lightcurve was obtained by American astronomer Donald P. Pray at his Carbuncle Hill Observatory (912). It gave a long rotation period of 131.3 hours with a brightness variation of approximately 0.75 in magnitude (U=2).

=== Diameter and albedo ===
According to two different data sets from NASA's space-based Wide-field Infrared Survey Explorer with its subsequent NEOWISE mission, Jim Young measures between 6.6 and 7.7 kilometers in diameter and its surface has an albedo between 0.190 and 0.251. The Collaborative Asteroid Lightcurve Link assumes an albedo of 0.24 – derived from 8 Flora, the family's largest member and namesake – and calculates a diameter of 7.5 kilometers with an absolute magnitude of 12.8.

== Naming ==
This minor planet was named for American astronomer James Young at JPL's Table Mountain Observatory near Wrightwood, California. At the time of citation, his numerous photometric observations significantly contributed to the number of then known rotation periods of asteroids. The official naming citation was published by the Minor Planet Center on 10 September 1984 (M.P.C. 9081). Young is also a prolific discoverer of minor planets, credited by the Minor Planet Center with the discovery of more than 250 numbered bodies.
