= 1720 Niels =

Main-belt asteroid

Discovery
- Discovered by: K. Reinmuth
- Discovery site: Heidelberg Obs.
- Discovery date: 7 February 1935

Designations
- Named after: Niels (discoverer's grandson)
- Alternative designations: 1935 CQ · 1940 WH; 1951 AL · 1953 VO_{1} 1959 RA · 1963 WE
- Minor planet category: main-belt · (inner)

Orbital characteristics
- Epoch 4 September 2017 (JD 2458000.5)
- Uncertainty parameter 0
- Observation arc: 89.52 yr (32,697 days)
- Aphelion: 2.4170 AU
- Perihelion: 1.9593 AU
- Semi-major axis: 2.1881 AU
- Eccentricity: 0.1046
- Orbital period (sidereal): 3.24 yr (1,182 days)
- Mean anomaly: 240.21°
- Inclination: 0.7301°
- Longitude of ascending node: 127.86°
- Argument of perihelion: 308.86°

Physical characteristics
- Dimensions: 6.394±0.091; 6.566±0.063 km 8.18 km (calculated)
- Synodic rotation period: 9.976 h 19.2 h
- Geometric albedo: 0.20 (assumed); 0.2154±0.0284; 0.227±0.017
- Spectral type: LS · S
- Absolute magnitude (H): 12.22±0.25 · 12.8 · 13.2

1720 Niels, provisional designation 1935 CQ, is a stony asteroid from the inner regions of the asteroid belt, approximately 6.4 kilometers in diameter. It was discovered on 7 February 1935, by German astronomer Karl Reinmuth at Heidelberg Observatory in southern Germany, and named after a grandson of the discoverer.

== Orbit and classification ==
Niels orbits the Sun in the inner main-belt at a distance of 2.0–2.4 AU once every 3 years and 3 months (1,182 days). Its orbit has an eccentricity of 0.10 and an inclination of 1° with respect to the ecliptic. First observed at Heidelberg in 1927, Niels' observation arc begins with its official discovery observation in 1935.

== Physical characteristics ==
Pan-STARRS classifies this stony asteroid as a LS-type, an intermediate to the rare L-type asteroids.

=== Rotation period ===
A rotational lightcurve of Niels was obtained by astronomer Maurice Clark in December 2005. It gave it a rotation period of 9.976 hours with a brightness variation of 0.15 magnitude (U=1). In November 2008, photometric observations by amateur astronomer Pierre Antonini gave another period of 19.2 hours with an amplitude of 0.01 (U=1-). As of 2017, a secure period for Niels has not yet been obtained.

=== Diameter and albedo ===
According to the survey carried out by NASA's Wide-field Infrared Survey Explorer with its subsequent NEOWISE mission, Niels measures 6.394 kilometers in diameter, and its surface has an albedo of 0.227, superseding a preliminary result that gave a slightly larger diameter and lower albedo. The Collaborative Asteroid Lightcurve Link assumes a standard albedo for stony asteroids of 0.20 and calculates a diameter of 8.18 kilometers based on an absolute magnitude of 12.8.

== Naming ==
The minor planet was named by the discoverer after his grandson, Niels. Reinmuth also named 1719 Jens after one of his grandsons. The official naming citation was published by the Minor Planet Center on 20 February 1976 (M.P.C. 3933).
