= James Whitney Young =

American astronomer

James W. Young
- Born: 24 January 1941 (age 85); Portland, Oregon, U.S.
- Scientific career
- Fields: Astronomy

Minor planets discovered: 257
see § List of discovered minor planets

James Whitney Young (born January 24, 1941) is an American astronomer who worked in the field of asteroid research. After nearly 47 years with the Jet Propulsion Laboratory at their Table Mountain Facility, Young retired July 16, 2009.

He observed the physical properties and astrometric positions of many minor planets, and had discovered more than 250 asteroids since 2002, most of them from the main-belt, as well as several near-Earth objects, Mars-crossers and Jupiter trojans. He also discovered SN 2004eg, an extra-galactic supernova.

The Florian asteroid 2874 Jim Young was named in his honor.

== Biography ==
James W. Young (aka Jim Young) was born in Portland, Oregon and recently retired as the resident astronomer of the Jet Propulsion Laboratory's Table Mountain Observatory (TMO) near Wrightwood, California having been with them for 47 years.

Young was the lead technical guide at the NASA exhibit of the Seattle World's Fair during 1962. It was there he was encouraged to apply for an 'assistant observer' and 'darkroom technician' position at the recently developed Table Mountain Observatory with its new 16-inch (410 mm) telescope which had just begun full operations in late 1962.

=== Table Mountain Observatory ===
Along with Charles F. Capen, Jr. (TMO's first resident astronomer), Young carried out photographic synoptic patrols using specific colors (UV through IR) of Venus, Mars, Jupiter, and Saturn. Several technical reports were published of 'patrol' images of Mars during two Martian apparitions (1964–65 and 1966–67). The 1964 inferior conjunction of Venus was well observed from TMO. Color astrophotography was carefully investigated for planetary imaging using recently developed high speed color film emulsions.

With the newly (1966) installed 24-inch (610 mm) Cassegrain/Coudé telescope, Young began his asteroid observations with JPL astronomers, Ellis D. Miner and Alan W. Harris. Asteroid rotational rates became his speciality soon thereafter and by 1980, over 30 publications in Icarus with Alan W. Harris resulted in nearly half of the (then) known rotational rates of these small solar system bodies.

With the advent of powerful lasers, Young became involved with several projects that aimed lasers successfully, first at the Surveyor VII spacecraft on the Moon (1968), later as two laser ranging programs developed at JPL in the 1990s found their marks on low and high earth orbiting satellites, and finally to the Galileo spacecraft some 6 million kilometers from Earth. In each case, Young was responsible for aiming/tracking the 24-inch (610 mm) telescope on each successive target.

=== Hypersensitization ===
Other noteworthy projects Young was involved in included the 1969 installation of a large planetary spectrograph utilizing the Coudé focus of the 24-inch (610 mm) telescope. Spectroscopic studies of the planet Venus were carried out by JPL astronomers, Andrew and Louise Young, with Jim Young assisting with hypersensitization of Eastman Kodak IR spectroscopic glass plates. Jim Young developed a new technique of cold storage for these extremely sensitive plates. His experimentation of 'clean' and properly washed plates, stored at −70 °C. for over two years, were without increased noise or loss of sensitivity. Previous experimenters could manage around a two-month reliability.

=== 2-Micron All Sky Survey ===
In 1998, Young was asked to be an official observer for the 2-Micron All Sky Survey (2MASS), a joint venture of Caltech (California Institute of Technology) and the University of Massachusetts Amherst (UMass). Young carried out observations for this project at Mount Hopkins (south of Tucson, Arizona) and at the Cerro Tololo Inter-American Observatory (CTIO) in Chile until 2000, all the while maintaining his full Table Mountain Observatory responsibilities for JPL.

=== Near Earth Objects ===
Late in 2002, Young began his last asteroid research, centering on NEOs and comets that have been discovered by several NASA funded NEO search teams such as NEAT, LINEAR, LONEOS, Catalina Sky Survey (CSS), and Spacewatch. With the use of Astrometrica software, Young become an extremely prolific astrometrist for the Minor Planet Center (MPC) of the Smithsonian Astrophysical Observatory (SAO) in Cambridge, Massachusetts. The director of the MPC, Dr. Brian G. Marsden called Young the third most accurate and reliable observer in the world then. He also co-authored and authored over 1500 MPECs (Minor Planet Electronic Circulars) and IAUCs (International Astronomical Union Circulars) during these last 7 years at JPL. NASA awarded Young a three-year grant to further his studies of NEOs and comets for JPL and the MPC during the last years before his retirement.

In 2003 Young accepted a new responsibility as 'Astronomy Team Leader' at Table Mountain, and supervised a staff of three employees in maintaining two optical telescopes (0.4 and 0.6 meter cassegrain systems), four CCD cameras, and a computer network of over 20 computers. Young maintained the optical performance of the telescopes, and the vacuum requirements for the CCD cameras. He also was in charge of the telescope scheduling for all visiting astronomers and his staff. TMO recently placed their new on-line webpage for all users as well as the public (see below link).

=== List of discovered minor planets ===
James Whitney Young is credited as "J. W. Young" by the Minor Planet Center with the discovery of 256 minor planets made between 2002 and 2009.

78577 JPL	10 September 2002	list
84882 Table Mountain	1 February 2003	list
90525 Karijanberg	17 March 2004	list
95939 Thagnesland	30 May 2003	list
114239 Bermarmi	21 November 2002	list
115312 Whither	19 September 2003	list
115477 Brantanica	19 October 2003	list
(115485) 2003 UR19	22 October 2003	list
115891 Scottmichael	14 November 2003	list
116446 McDermid	5 January 2004	list
116903 Jeromeapt	11 April 2004	list
120038 Franlainsher	26 January 2003	list
120174 Jeffjenny	23 May 2003	list
128297 Ashlevi	13 December 2003	list
(128621) 2004 RD	2 September 2004	list
(129066) 2004 VY28	7 November 2004	list
133280 Bryleen	18 September 2003	list
133527 Fredearly	5 October 2003	list
(134010) 2004 VW28	7 November 2004	list
142084 Jamesdaniel	29 August 2002	list
(143052) 2002 WY2	24 November 2002	list
144692 Katemary	9 April 2004	list
145166 Leojematt	3 May 2005	list
147397 Bobhazel	30 March 2003	list
(147735) 2005 NE	2 July 2005	list

(147799) 2005 RA34	15 September 2005	list
(149450) 2003 CE14	6 February 2003	list
(149976) 2005 UO6	24 October 2005	list
150035 Williamson	20 November 2005	list
(152212) 2005 RG	1 September 2005	list
(152471) 2005 WE1	21 November 2005	list
(158621) 2003 BJ	20 January 2003	list
158899 Malloryvale	17 August 2004	list
(161384) 2003 UK25	24 October 2003	list
163626 Glatfelter	27 October 2002	list
(163950) 2003 UN22	23 October 2003	list
(170025) 2002 VO	2 November 2002	list
(170026) 2002 VV2	4 November 2002	list
(170027) 2002 VH5	5 November 2002	list
(171287) 2006 GK3	7 April 2006	list
(172460) 2003 RT11	15 September 2003	list
(172533) 2003 UO9	20 October 2003	list
(172627) 2003 XP10	9 December 2003	list
(173075) 2006 UC	16 October 2006	list
(174758) 2003 VX2	14 November 2003	list
177065 Samuelnoah	30 March 2003	list
(177245) 2003 WB	17 November 2003	list
177625 Dembicky	8 May 2004	list
(180103) 2003 FX6	26 March 2003	list
(180213) 2003 UM8	19 October 2003	list

(180216) 2003 UY9	20 October 2003	list
(180537) 2004 EB1	14 March 2004	list
(180731) 2004 JW35	13 May 2004	list
(181492) 2006 UU1	16 October 2006	list
(183309) 2002 VQ	2 November 2002	list
(183501) 2003 FU4	25 March 2003	list
184064 Miner	10 April 2004	list
185641 Judd	5 March 2008	list
(186728) 2004 CH2	12 February 2004	list
(187304) 2005 UV	23 October 2005	list
(188588) 2005 NP29	8 July 2005	list
(188721) 2005 UU	23 October 2005	list
189944 Leblanc	3 October 2003	list
(190118) 2004 VR60	10 November 2004	list
(191323) 2003 KN	22 May 2003	list
(191485) 2003 TO2	7 October 2003	list
(191621) 2004 MN3	19 June 2004	list
(196297) 2003 FA	21 March 2003	list
(196926) 2003 UG5	18 October 2003	list
198110 Heathrhoades	17 September 2004	list
(199742) 2006 JD	1 May 2006	list
201777 Deronda	24 November 2003	list
(202084) 2004 SE56	30 September 2004	list
(206462) 2003 TN10	15 October 2003	list
(206755) 2004 CJ2	12 February 2004	list

(207028) 2004 VN60	10 November 2004	list
(207548) 2006 LZ	4 June 2006	list
(207690) 2007 RE19	14 September 2007	list
(209635) 2005 BR1	17 January 2005	list
(211480) 2003 FC7	26 March 2003	list
(211489) 2003 KP	22 May 2003	list
(211536) 2003 RR11	15 September 2003	list
(211917) 2004 TG8	4 October 2004	list
(213727) 2002 VF92	13 November 2002	list
(213893) 2003 TN2	7 October 2003	list
(213894) 2003 TP2	8 October 2003	list
(216242) 2006 VK14	15 November 2006	list
216780 Lilianne	27 August 2006	list
(217425) 2005 RF	1 September 2005	list
(218653) 2005 SB_{134}	30 September 2005	list
(220397) 2003 RK_{10}	12 September 2003	list
(220578) 2004 JG	8 May 2004	list
(220634) 2004 QC_{25}	30 August 2004	list
221019 Raine	13 August 2005	list
(221332) 2005 WB_{2}	22 November 2005	list
(221778) 2007 KC	16 May 2007	list
(223349) 2003 RP_{11}	15 September 2003	list
(223907) 2004 VO_{60}	10 November 2004	list
(223908) 2004 VQ_{60}	10 November 2004	list
224067 Colemila	8 July 2005	list

(226331) 2003 FL	22 March 2003	list
(226810) 2004 RL_{222}	14 September 2004	list
(227331) 2005 UW	23 October 2005	list
(229368) 2005 RC_{3}	5 September 2005	list
(229616) 2006 DK_{68}	23 February 2006	list
(230550) 2003 BM	21 January 2003	list
(230737) 2003 WX_{7}	18 November 2003	list
(231463) 2007 PO	5 August 2007	list
(232595) 2003 UP_{9}	20 October 2003	list
(232936) 2005 BX_{2}	19 January 2005	list
(233332) 2006 CS_{10}	8 February 2006	list
(233749) 2008 TF_{3}	2 October 2008	list
(238022) 2002 VE_{5}	5 November 2002	list
(239313) 2007 RM_{16}	13 September 2007	list
(240556) 2004 RQ_{164}	8 September 2004	list
(242640) 2005 ND	2 July 2005	list
(245486) 2005 PF_{17}	13 August 2005	list
(248904) 2006 VE	1 November 2006	list
(250711) 2005 RZ_{33}	15 September 2005	list
(250907) 2005 WK	19 November 2005	list
(253333) 2003 FA_{7}	26 March 2003	list
(253383) 2003 KA	20 May 2003	list
(253859) 2004 AL	11 January 2004	list
(254157) 2004 PT_{92}	11 August 2004	list
(255307) 2005 WR	20 November 2005	list

(255743) 2006 RV	4 September 2006	list
(256128) 2006 VD	1 November 2006	list
(256602) 2007 VO_{1}	2 November 2007	list
(259615) 2003 VZ_{2}	14 November 2003	list
(259680) 2003 XC_{11}	13 December 2003	list
(260097) 2004 MX_{3}	22 June 2004	list
(260384) 2004 VP_{60}	10 November 2004	list
(260835) 2005 QD_{29}	29 August 2005	list
(261932) 2006 MU_{1}	19 June 2006	list
(261984) 2006 QT_{23}	22 August 2006	list
(265031) 2003 OT	21 July 2003	list
(265526) 2005 NA	1 July 2005	list
(267625) 2002 RD_{232}	11 September 2002	list
(267767) 2003 RJ_{10}	3 September 2003	list^{[A]}
(270920) 2002 UT	25 October 2002	list
(271110) 2003 RO_{11}	15 September 2003	list
(271474) 2004 FG_{6}	24 March 2004	list
(273959) 2007 KX_{1}	18 May 2007	list
(273995) 2007 OB	16 July 2007	list
(274335) 2008 RW_{22}	5 September 2008	list
(276361) 2002 VG_{5}	5 November 2002	list
(276471) 2003 KL_{3}	23 May 2003	list
(277029) 2005 CG_{7}	4 February 2005	list
(278734) 2008 SN_{82}	23 September 2008	list
(278736) 2008 SX_{84}	28 September 2008	list

(281235) 2007 JE_{36}	15 May 2007	list
281445 Scotthowe	28 September 2008	list
(287374) 2002 VR	2 November 2002	list
(287417) 2002 WX_{2}	24 November 2002	list
(287577) 2003 FE42	31 March 2003	list
(287842) 2003 SX_{219}	29 September 2003	list
(288425) 2004 EE	11 March 2004	list
(288474) 2004 FE_{6}	24 March 2004	list
(288691) 2004 QE	16 August 2004	list
(288703) 2004 RE	2 September 2004	list
(288957) 2004 TJ_{9}	7 October 2004	list
(290002) 2005 PC_{17}	12 August 2005	list
(290183) 2005 SZ_{4}	25 September 2005	list
(291399) 2006 CD_{60}	11 February 2006	list
(293605) 2007 KB	16 May 2007	list
(295035) 2008 EU_{83}	12 March 2008	list
(295442) 2008 LU_{16}	15 June 2008	list
(298635) 2004 BM_{41}	23 January 2004	list
(298793) 2004 QE_{3}	18 August 2004	list
(299291) 2005 PK_{17}	13 August 2005	list
(299453) 2006 BS_{55}	22 January 2006	list
(299509) 2006 CJ_{10}	7 February 2006	list
(299693) 2006 QZ_{110}	30 August 2006	list
301021 Sofiarodriguez	23 September 2008	list
303265 Littmann	8 September 2004	list

(303452) 2005 BL_{14}	20 January 2005	list
(306209) 2011 QZ_{18}	26 March 2003	list
(309524) 2007 XG_{24}	15 December 2007	list
(311831) 2006 VS_{13}	13 November 2006	list
313892 Furnish	8 May 2004	list
(314457) 2005 WL	20 November 2005	list
(319134) 2005 YV_{8}	20 December 2005	list
(319798) 2006 VJ_{14}	15 November 2006	list
(320088) 2007 EX_{87}	14 March 2007	list
323552 Trudybell	2 October 2004	list
(324275) 2006 CH_{10}	4 February 2006	list
(327009) 2004 RK_{84}	10 September 2004	list
327421 Yanamandra	20 November 2005	list
(327552) 2006 CO_{10}	4 February 2006	list
(329740) 2003 YP_{117}	17 December 2003	list
(329778) 2004 MA_{4}	22 June 2004	list
(329876) 2005 BT_{2}	19 January 2005	list
(330226) 2006 JU_{26}	7 May 2006	list
(330476) 2007 FH_{6}	17 August 2004	list
(330697) 2008 KZ_{11}	29 May 2008	list
(335014) 2004 JJ	8 May 2004	list
(335028) 2004 PU_{92}	11 August 2004	list
(335332) 2005 RD	1 September 2005	list
(335466) 2005 WQ	20 November 2005	list
(338400) 2003 BK	20 January 2003	list

(339384) 2005 BZ_{1}	18 January 2005	list
(339385) 2005 BU_{2}	19 January 2005	list
(341868) 2008 GU_{1}	4 April 2008	list
(343399) 2010 CE_{170}	14 February 2004	list
(344595) 2003 CN_{11}	5 February 2003	list
(344830) 2004 FE_{18}	25 March 2004	list
(346391) 2008 SV_{84}	28 September 2008	list
(347901) 2002 VD_{5}	4 November 2002	list
(347932) 2003 FW_{4}	25 March 2003	list
(348172) 2004 MY_{7}	29 June 2004	list
(349766) 2009 AH_{43}	7 January 2009	list
(350968) 2003 CH_{14}	6 February 2003	list
(351235) 2004 PW_{92}	11 August 2004	list
(351677) 2006 AM_{78}	11 January 2006	list
(354835) 2005 YB	19 December 2005	list
(359771) 2011 UV_{127}	1 September 2006	list
(361139) 2006 HN_{57}	29 April 2006	list
364166 Trebek	1 May 2006	list
(364819) 2008 CB_{2}	2 February 2008	list
(371789) 2007 OE_{3}	21 July 2007	list
(372232) 2008 UR_{91}	28 October 2008	list
(373986) 2004 AK	11 January 2004	list
(374404) 2005 WM	20 November 2005	list
(377081) 2002 VA_{1}	3 November 2002	list
(378266) 2007 ED_{10}	10 March 2007	list

(378370) 2007 ON_{5}	24 July 2007	list
(378918) 2008 UQ_{91}	28 October 2008	list
(380522) 2004 GK	10 April 2004	list
(382979) 2005 BK_{14}	20 January 2005	list
(383620) 2007 NG_{3}	13 July 2007	list
(386087) 2007 OD_{3}	21 July 2007	list
(387730) 2003 FF_{42}	31 March 2003	list
(388018) 2005 SA_{26}	29 September 2005	list
(391766) 2008 FA	19 March 2008	list
(391796) 2008 RH_{78}	10 September 2008	list
(394428) 2007 KA	16 May 2007	list
(400291) 2007 TS_{69}	14 October 2007	list
(405301) 2003 UH_{5}	18 October 2003	list
410817 Zaffino	19 June 2009	list
(413647) 2005 VS_{7}	12 November 2005	list
416273 Glennsnyder	8 April 2003	list
416583 Jacereece	8 May 2004	list
(417020) 2005 UX_{64}	29 October 2005	list
(417380) 2006 HM_{57}	29 April 2006	list
(423163) 2004 FD_{18}	25 March 2004	list
(427688) 2004 ET	13 March 2004	list
(427928) 2005 VQ_{1}	4 November 2005	list
(427939) 2005 WG	19 November 2005	list
(428067) 2006 GM_{3}	7 April 2006	list
(431625) 2007 WX3	18 November 2007	list

(434491) 2005 SZ_{25}	29 September 2005	list
(447078) 2004 TF_{8}	4 October 2004	list
(447286) 2005 WA_{2}	22 November 2005	list
(457275) 2008 RK_{78}	10 September 2008	list
(481388) 2006 RD_{1}	6 September 2006	list
(483592) 2004 MY_{3}	22 June 2004	list
(497011) 2003 BA_{82}	27 January 2003	list
(541913) 2012 DN_{8}	16 August 2005	list
(567887) 2002 VF_{5}	5 November 2002	list
(570220) 2006 GJ_{3}	7 April 2006	list
(572561) 2008 RJ_{78}	10 September 2008	list
(577530) 2013 GQ_{9}	1 June 2006	list
(596094) 2005 BJ_{14}	20 January 2005	list
(596908) 2006 JA	1 May 2006	list
(597006) 2006 QP_{89}	29 August 2006	list
(601791) 2013 RS_{65}	29 August 2006	list
(609797) 2005 SA	16 September 2005	list
(615849) 2004 KH_{1}	19 May 2004	list
(624407) 2002 VZ	2 November 2002	list
(625218) 2005 SP_{25}	28 September 2005	list
(625765) 2006 RS	3 September 2006	list
(630270) 2005 PB_{17}	12 August 2005	list
(631525) 2007 KF	16 May 2007	list
(633054) 2009 CB	1 February 2009	list
(634742) 2012 JH_{1}	17 May 2007	list

(642296) 2005 QC_{29}	29 August 2005	list
(643786) 2006 RR	3 September 2006	list
(643787) 2006 RW	4 September 2006	list
(645976) 2007 XC_{23}	14 December 2007	list
(648128) 2009 KC	16 May 2009	list
(662359) 2006 AV_{44}	10 January 2006	list
(662566) 2006 JA_{26}	2 May 2006	list
(664406) 2008 ML_{1}	29 June 2008	list
(664690) 2008 TO	1 October 2008	list
(670526) 2013 TQ_{68}	15 March 2004	list
(680634) 2002 VX_{2}	4 November 2002	list
(682386) 2006 QO_{89}	29 August 2006	list
(718771) 2017 SD_{84}	13 August 2005	list
(721238) 2003 KO	22 May 2003	list
(721767) 2004 EF	11 March 2004	list
(723155) 2006 QJ_{33}	24 August 2006	list
(731000) 2012 XF_{48}	14 February 2004	list
(731314) 2013 CN_{173}	26 March 2003	list
(737590) 2016 CV_{259}	22 November 2002	list
(740422) 2002 VE_{92}	12 November 2002	list
(740843) 2004 QK	17 August 2004	list
(757593) 2004 EC_{1}	14 March 2004	list
(757660) 2004 QC	16 August 2004	list
(757661) 2004 QD	16 August 2004	list
(758955) 2007 OA	16 July 2007	list

(762722) 2011 JD_{20}	4 February 2005	list
(774225) 2002 VH_{2}	3 November 2002	list
(817904) 2012 XQ_{49}	25 November 2004	list
(828022) 2003 FH_{42}	31 March 2003	list
(828049) 2003 KM	22 May 2003	list
(828225) 2003 TF_{2}	5 October 2003	list
(838210) 2014 DN_{32}	26 March 2003	list
(848823) 2005 BN_{14}	20 January 2005	list
(850593) 2007 FD_{20}	24 March 2007	list
(853009) 2008 WU_{58}	21 November 2008	list
(884420) 2017 OH_{64}	1 October 2005	list
Co-discovery made with:^{A} A. Grigsby

== Outreach ==
Young taught an astronomy extension course for the University of California, Riverside in 1969 and 1970 specifically for high school and junior college teachers and educators.

Young frequently lectures about his work to youth, school, civic, and church groups around the western USA. In 2006 he attended the International Astronomical Union's (IAU) General Assembly 2006 in Prague, Czech Republic. Young gave a presentation on his activities taking astrometric observations of NEOs and comets at Table Mountain Observatory in the S236 Symposium on August 14. Young, and his wife Karen (a HS Science and Math teacher), hold annual star-parties for their local communities as an Outreach Program. The 13th annual event, was held on October 15, 2010. The event was attended by approximately 80 people, with many school children, parents, and Boy Scouts present. With six telescopes, many from members of the High Desert Astronomical Society (HiDAS), participants viewed the moon, and later when the clouds cleared in the east, a shadow transit of Io across Jupiter's cloud surface was seen.

Mr. Young spoke at the Imiloa Astronomy Center in Hilo, Hawaii on December 23, 2010. Young's presentation, entitled "The First Asteroid Discovery to Near-Earth Hazards" featured Scott Manley's visualization titled, '1980-2010 Asteroid Discoveries', a six-minute version (made especially for this presentation, with a re-mix of the music "Transgenic" from Trifonic Music, LLC). Still in Hilo, Mr. Young also gave an evening fireside at the Hilo Stake Center of the Church of Jesus Christ of Latter-Day Saints, entitled, "The Creation as Viewed by an Astronomer". This same fireside was given in Dallas, Texas; Atlanta, Georgia; and Medina, Ohio in May, 2011.

On the afternoon of June 5, Young held a viewing of the Venus transit from Wrightwood, California for the local community. Mr. Young's 6-inch telescope was used with a solar filter for the 80-100 people who attended, as well as photography to record the event with a 2000mm telephoto lens.

== Honors ==
The Florian asteroid 2874 Jim Young, discovered by Edward Bowell in 1982, was named in his honor.

== Memberships and affiliations ==
Type	Organization
Full Member	American Astronomical Society (AAS)

== Asteroid meanings ==
List of named minor planet and their meanings
Minor planet	Named for	Description	Ref
78577 JPL	Jet Propulsion Laboratory	Named for the NASA facility where Young was employed from 1962 to 2009.	MPC
84882 Table Mountain	Table Mountain Obs.	Named for Young's actual work place Table Mountain Observatory, near Wrightwood, California.	MPC
90525 Karijanberg	Karen Young; Richard and Janet Halberg	Named for Young's wife, Karen (1953-) and her parents, Richard (1928–1978) and Janet (1932–1997).	MPC
95939 Thagnesland	Thaddeus and Agnes Vreeland	Named for Young's maternal grandparents, Thaddeus (1866–1921) and Agnes (1877–1961) Vreeland.	MPC
114239 Bermarmi	Bernard, Mary and Michael Young	Named for Young's parents, Bernard (1911–1988) and Mary (1912–1996), and well as his brother, Michael (1937-).	MPC
115312 Whither	Whitney and Heather Young	Named for Whitney and Heather Young, granddaughters of James Young; two children of son, Jeffrey.	MPC
115477 Brantanica	grandchildren	Named for Brandon, Brittany and Monica, grandchildren of James Young, and the three children of daughter, Jennifer.	MPC
115891 Scottmichael	grandchildren	Named for Scott and Michael, grandchildren of James Young, two children of son, Jeffrey.	MPC
116446 McDermid	Stuart McDermid	Named for Stuart McDermid (1952-), a JPL Science Division senior research scientist responsible for development of the LIDAR facility at Table Mountain Observatory for atmospheric analysis studies.	MPC
116903 Jeromeapt	Jerome Apt	Named for Jerome (Jay) Apt (1949-), Former director of JPL's Table Mountain Observatory, retired NASA astronaut who flew 4 missions on the International Space Station, and currently a professor at Carnegie Mellon University, Pittsburgh, Pennsylvania.	MPC
120038 Franlainsher	Frances and Elaine Fisher	Named for Young's first wife, Frances (1944-) and her sister, Elaine (1947-) Fisher.	MPC
120174 Jeffjenny	Jeffrey and Jennifer Young	Named for Young's first children (with Frances), Jeffrey (1966-) (1967-).	MPC
128297 Ashlevi	Ashlie Philpott; Levi Lemley	Named for Ashlie Philpott and Levi Lemley, grandchildren of James Young, and children of daughter, Eileen.	MPC
133280 Bryleen	Bryan and Eileen Young	Named for Young's children (with Karen), Bryan (1976-) and Eileen (1979-).	MPC
133527 Fredearly	Frederick and Pearl Young	Named for Young's paternal grandparents, Frederick (1889–1974) and Pearl Young (1888–1958).	MPC
142084 Jamesdaniel	James and Daniel Sealy	Named for James (1951–1978) and Daniel (1957-), the two sons of Bob and Hazel Sealy.	MPC
144692 Katemary	Katelyn Young	Named for Young's granddaughter, Katelyn Anne Marie Young (b. 1999), the daughter of Jim's son, Bryan.	MPC
147397 Bobhazel	Bob and Hazel Sealy	Named for Bob (1927–2002) and Hazel (1930–2020) Sealy, longtime residents of Seaside, Oregon. The Sealy family were, in part, very instrumental in Jim Young's long astronomy career starting from Jim's annual summer vacations in Seaside. Bob Sealy was an amateur astronomer, and started the Seaside Amateur Astronomer's Society, as well as taught astronomy classes at Clatsop Community College in Astoria, Oregon. Hazel Sealy was very active in the Miss Oregon Pageant in the 1950s and 60s, and still is an active member of local community affairs. James Sealy tragically lost his life in a boating accident in the ocean waters just outside Seaside on July 8, 1978. Daniel is an amateur astronomer, ham radio operator, and community member while residing in Astoria, Oregon, along with his wife and two children.	MPC
150035 Williamson	Bruce Williamson	Named for Bruce Williamson (1953-), machinist at the Table Mountain Facility.	MPC
158899 Malloryvale	Mallory Vale	Named for Mallory Vale (1986-), a 2004 summer student at Table Mountain Observatory, who will be graduating from Northern Arizona University with a BS degree in astronomy in the Spring of 2009.	MPC
163626 Glatfelter	Pam Glatfelter	Named for Pam Glatfelter (1955-), the operational site manager for the Table Mountain Facility.	MPC
185641 Judd	Michele Judd	Named for Michele Judd (1965-), a Senior Engineer of JPL's Science Division who left JPL in 2008 to become the managing director of the Keck Institute for Space Studies at Caltech.	MPC
198110 Heathrhoades	Heath Rhoades	Named for Heath Rhoades (1972-), the telescope computer network administrator and programmer at Table Mountain Observatory.	MPC
201777 Deronda	Deronda Mayes	Named for Deronda Mayes (1957-), assistant astronomer at Table Mountain Observatory.	MPC
221019 Raine	Raine Krecic	Named for Raine Ann Krecic (2011-), granddaughter of James Young, and child of daughter, Eileen.	MPC
313892 Furnish	James F. Furnish	Named for James F. Furnish (1950–2021), a commercial fisherman and owner of the Hylah Ruth of Astoria, Oregon. He fished from California to Alaska, and the Columbia River for fish, crab, and a digger of razor clams. Furnish was actively involved with community government and school issues in Gearhart, Oregon, USA.	MPC

== See also ==
- List of minor planet discoverers
