= 306 Unitas =

Main-belt asteroid

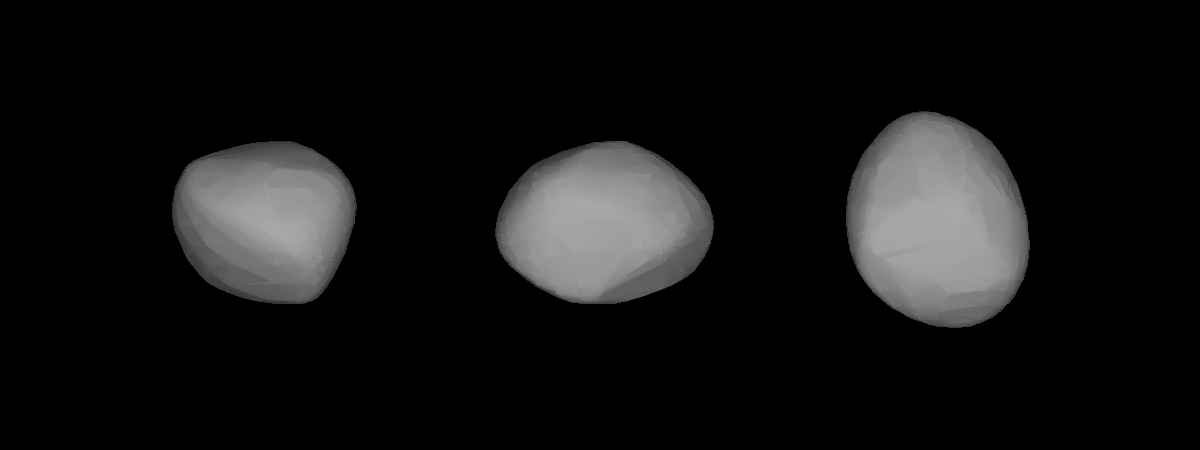
- A three-dimensional model of 306 Unitas based on its lightcurve

Discovery
- Discovered by: Elia Millosevich
- Discovery date: 1 March 1891

Designations
- Pronunciation: /ˈjuːnɪtæs/
- Alternative designations: A891 EA
- Minor planet category: Main belt

Orbital characteristics
- Epoch 31 July 2016 (JD 2457600.5)
- Uncertainty parameter 0
- Observation arc: 124.78 yr (45575 d)
- Aphelion: 2.71480 AU (406.128 Gm)
- Perihelion: 2.0009 AU (299.33 Gm)
- Semi-major axis: 2.35785 AU (352.729 Gm)
- Eccentricity: 0.15139
- Orbital period (sidereal): 3.62 yr (1322.4 d)
- Mean anomaly: 88.9729°
- Mean motion: 0° 16^{m} 20.014^{s} / day
- Inclination: 7.2779°
- Longitude of ascending node: 141.912°
- Argument of perihelion: 168.008°

Physical characteristics
- Mean diameter: 49 ± 5 km 53 ± 5 (alternate)
- Mass: (5.33 ± 5.77) × 10^{17} kg
- Synodic rotation period: 8.736 h (0.3640 d); 8.73875 h
- Pole ecliptic longitude: 79° 253° (alternate)
- Pole ecliptic latitude: −35° −17° (alternate)
- Geometric albedo: 0.2112±0.023; 0.211
- Spectral type: S
- Absolute magnitude (H): 8.96

306 Unitas is a typical main belt asteroid that was discovered by Elia Millosevich on 1 March 1891 in Rome. The asteroid was named by the director of the Modena Observatory in honor of the Italian astronomer Angelo Secchi (author of Unità delle forze fisiche) and the unification of Italy.

This object is orbiting the Sun with a distance of 2.36 AU and an eccentricity of 0.15 with an orbital period of 3.62 years. Its orbital plane is inclined at an angle of 7.28° to the plane of the ecliptic. Although 306 Unitas has an orbit similar to the Vesta family asteroids, it was found to be an unrelated interloper on the basis of its non-matching spectral type. Based on infrared measurements, it has a diameter of 47.2 km. It is classified as a stony S-type asteroid.

In the late 1990s, a network of astronomers worldwide gathered light curve data that was ultimately used to derive the spin states and shape models of 10 new asteroids, including 306 Unitas. The computed shape model for this asteroid is regular, while the light curve displays two maxima per rotation. Lightcurve data has also been recorded by observers at the Antelope Hill Observatory, which has been designated as an official observatory by the Minor Planet Center.

Measurements of the thermal inertia of 306 Unitas give an estimate range from 100 to 260 m^{−2} K^{−1} s^{−1/2}, compared to 50 for lunar regolith and 400 for coarse sand in an atmosphere.

Orbit diagram of 306 Unitas

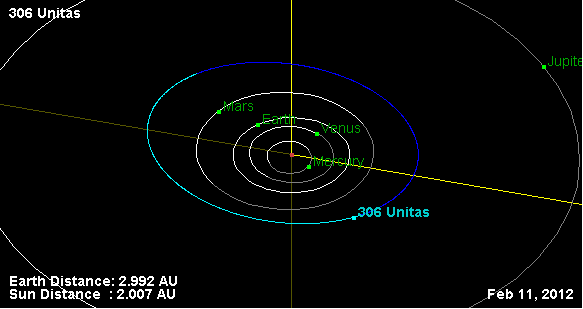
