= Table Mountain Observatory =

Astronomy facility in Big Pines, California

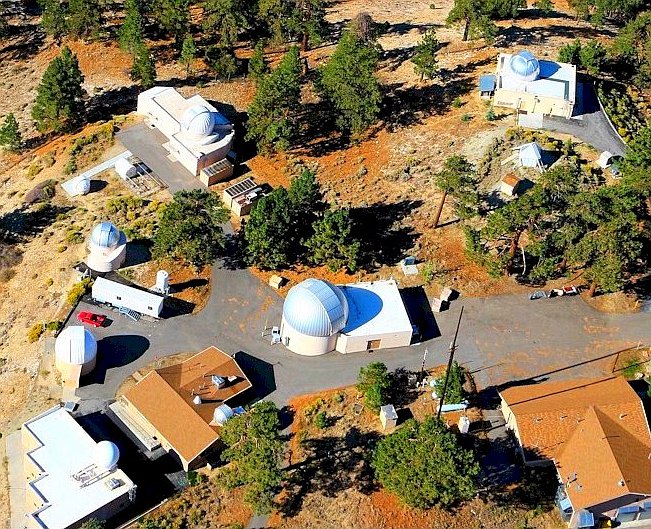
- Aerial view of Table Mountain Observatory
- Organization: NASA / JPL
- Observatory code: 673
- Location: Big Pines, California, U.S.
- Coordinates: 34.3820°N 117.6818°W
- Altitude: 2,286 meters (7,500 ft)
- Established: 1924; 102 years ago
- Website: tmf.jpl.nasa.gov

Telescopes
- Pomona College Telescope: 1.0 m reflector
- unnamed telescope: 0.6 m reflector
- Related media on Commons

Table Mountain Observatory (TMO) is an astronomical observation facility operated by NASA's Jet Propulsion Laboratory (California Institute of Technology). It is located in Big Pines, California, in the Angeles National Forest near Wrightwood, north-northeast of Los Angeles, California.

TMO is part of JPL's Table Mountain Facility (TMF). The larger site hosts a number of non-astronomical projects. The site was first used by the Smithsonian Institution in 1924, which conducted atmospheric, solar, and astronomical observations for many years. JPL took over the lease in 1962. The observatory conducts high-precision astrometric observations to support NASA and international spacecraft mission navigation, confirmation and recovery of near-Earth objects such as comets and asteroids that may potentially impact the Earth, and technology development.

The main-belt asteroid 84882 Table Mountain was named in honor of the observatory.

== List of discovered minor planets ==
More than 260 minor planets were discovered at TMO, often referred to as "Wrightwood" the Minor Planet Center and credited to several astronomers, most notably to James Young, but also to other astronomers such as Jack B. Child, Greg Fisch, A. Grigsby, D. Mayes, and Mallory Vale. The MPC also directly credits TMO with the discovery of one numbered main-belt asteroid (see table).

important;
(166609) 2002 RF232	10 September 2002	MPC

== Instruments ==
Two telescopes operate at TMO:

- The 1.02 m (40 in) Pomona College Telescope is a Cassegrain reflector built at Pomona College. It first became operational in 1985, and had new mirrors installed in 1996.
- A 0.6 m Ritchey-Chrétien reflector built by Astro Mechanics was installed in 1966. It is attached to an off-axis German equatorial mount.

Minor planets discovered: 1
see § List of discovered minor planets

=== Former instruments ===
Former instruments at TMO include:

- A 1.25 m (49 in) reflector previously located at Cloudcroft Observatory was acquired in the late 1980s and became operational in the early 1990s. It was removed from the TMO web site before June 2003.
- A 0.4 m (16 in) Ritchey-Chrétien reflector built by RC Optical Systems was attached to an equatorial mount. It was installed in 2003 and removed from the TMO web site before July 2011. It was housed in the dome where the Schmidt camera was previously located.
- A 0.4 m (16 in) Cassegrain reflector was installed at TMO in 1962. Harvey Mudd College was the main user of this telescope from the 1970s through at least 1991.
- A 0.6 m (24 in) Cassegrain reflector was installed at TMO in 1966.
- A 0.27 m (11 in) Schmidt camera owned by JPL operated at TMO from 1985 until at least 1991.
- A 5.5 m (18 ft) millimeter wavelength radio antenna was located at TMO from 1970 until at least 1985.
- A radio interferometer with dishes of 4.4 m (14 ft) and 3.0 m (9.8 ft) became operational at TMO in 1974.

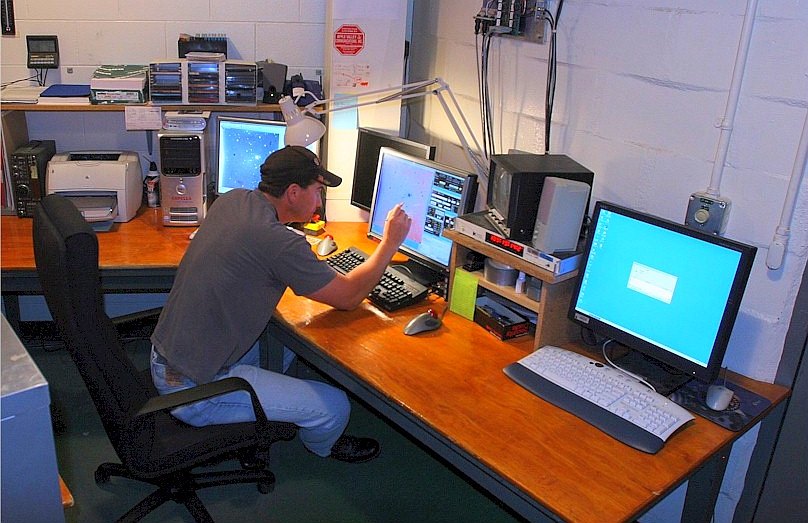
Observing with the 0.6m telescope

== Honours ==
The main-belt asteroid 84882 Table Mountain, discovered by James Whitney Young at TMO in 2003, was named in honor of the observatory. Naming citation was published on 28 October 2004 (M.P.C. 52955).

== See also ==
- Mount Wilson Observatory
- Fundamental station
- List of astronomical observatories
- List of asteroid-discovering observatories
- List of minor planet discoverers § Discovering dedicated institutions
