= Giuseppe Bianchi (astronomer) =

Italian astronomer

Giuseppe Bianchi (13 October 1791 in Modena – 25 December 1866) was an Italian astronomer.

After studying mathematics, physics, and astronomy at Padua, Bianchi taught astronomy at the University of Modena starting in 1819. He collaborated with Giovanni Battista Amici to direct the construction of the Observatory of Modena, and from there, astronomical observations started in 1827. In 1859 he was transferred to the marchese Montecuccoli's private observatory at Modena for political reasons.

He took part in the Commissione dei Pesi e Misure (Commission for Weights and Measures) and numerous scientific academies, and was secretary of the "Società italiana delle Scienze" (Italian Society of Science).

In 1834, he published "Acts of the Reale Osservatorio of Modena", describing the Observatory and all the work and observations he had carried out up to that year.
