= 5905 Johnson =

Hungaria asteroid and synchronous binary system

Discovery
- Discovered by: E. F. Helin
- Discovery site: Palomar Obs.
- Discovery date: 11 February 1989

Designations
- Named after: Lindley N. Johnson (astronomer, engineer)
- Alternative designations: 1989 CJ_{1}
- Minor planet category: main-belt · (inner); Hungaria · background

Orbital characteristics
- Epoch 23 March 2018 (JD 2458200.5)
- Uncertainty parameter 0
- Observation arc: 28.96 yr (10,576 days)
- Aphelion: 2.0476 AU
- Perihelion: 1.7727 AU
- Semi-major axis: 1.9102 AU
- Eccentricity: 0.0720
- Orbital period (sidereal): 2.64 yr (964 days)
- Mean anomaly: 174.14°
- Mean motion: 0° 22^{m} 23.88^{s} / day
- Inclination: 27.521°
- Longitude of ascending node: 141.28°
- Argument of perihelion: 208.81°
- Known satellites: 1 (P: 21.78 h; 0.4 D_{s}/D_{p}) (Note: Central Bureau for Astronomical Telegrams – IAUC 8511 Photometric observations obtained between 1 and 11 April 2005, reveal, that 5905 Johnson is a binary system with an orbital period of 21.78 hours. The primary rotates with a period of 3.783 hours. The lightcurve's amplitude of 0.11 magnitude suggests a nearly spheroidal shape. Mutual eclipse and occultation events between 0.15 and 0.18 magnitude, suggest a secondary-to-primary mean-diameter ratio of 0.4. The system's mean absolute R magnitude is 12.8±0.1. Reported by: Brian Warner (Palmer Divide Obs.) Petr Pravec and Peter Kušnirák (Ondřejov Obs., Czech Republic) Donald P. Pray (Carbuncle Hill Obs.); Adrián Galád and Štefan Gajdoš (Modra Obs., Slovakia) and P. Brown and Z. Krzeminski, Department of Physics and Astronomy, University of Western Ontario)

Physical characteristics
- Mean diameter: 3.62±0.67 km 3.85±0.66 km 4.1±0.5 km 4.728±0.064 km 4.791±0.065 km 4.797 km 4.80 km (taken)
- Synodic rotation period: 3.78142±0.0002 h (Note: Pravec (2011) web: rotational lightcurves with a rotation period of 3.7814±0.0002, 3.7814±0.0001 and 3.78142±0.00005 hours, respectively. Brightness amplitude varies between 0.18 and 0.20 mag. Summary figures at Collaborative Asteroid Lightcurve Link and Ondrejov Asteroid Photometry Project); 3.78222±0.0001 h 3.7823±0.0002 h 3.7824±0.0001 h 3.7827±0.0002 h (Note: Lightcurve plot of (5905) Johnson, with a rotation period of 3.7834 hours from the Palmer Divide Observatory, B. D. Warner (2008). Summary figures at LCDB)
- Geometric albedo: 0.1524; 0.1939±0.0278; 0.198±0.022; 0.25±0.10; 0.266±0.100; 0.44±0.17
- Spectral type: S (assumed)
- Absolute magnitude (H): 13.6±0.3 (R) · 14.0 · 14.00±0.1 · 14.15±0.92 · 14.21 · 14.255±0.13

5905 Johnson, provisional designation 1989 CJ_{1}, is a Hungaria asteroid and synchronous binary system from the innermost regions of the asteroid belt, approximately 4 kilometers (2.5 miles) in diameter. It was discovered on 11 February 1989, by American astronomer Eleanor Helin at Palomar Observatory in California, United States. Its satellite measures approximately 1.6 km (1 mi) in diameter and orbits its primary every 21.8 hours. It was named after American astronomer and engineer Lindley N. Johnson.

== Classification and orbit ==
Johnson is a stony S-type asteroid and member of the dynamical Hungaria group, which forms the innermost dense concentration of asteroids in the Solar System. It is, however, not a member of collisional Hungaria family, but a non-family asteroid of the main belt's background population when applying the hierarchical clustering method to its proper orbital elements.

It orbits the Sun in the inner asteroid belt at a distance of 1.8–2.0 AU once every 2 years and 8 months (964 days; semi-major axis of 1.91 AU). Its orbit has an eccentricity of 0.07 and an inclination of 28° with respect to the ecliptic. As no precoveries were taken, and no prior identifications were made, the body's observation arc begins at Palomar with its official discovery observation in February 1989.

== Diameter and albedo ==
According to the surveys carried out by NASA's space-based Spitzer and WISE telescopes, and the NEOWISE mission, Johnson measures between 3.62 and 4.791 kilometers in diameter, and its surface has an albedo between 0.19 and 0.44. The Collaborative Asteroid Lightcurve Link adopts Petr Pravec's revised WISE-data, that is, an albedo of 0.1524 and a diameter of 4.80 kilometers for an absolute magnitude of 14.255.

== Moon and lightcurves ==
Between 1 and 11 April 2005, the first ever rotational lightcurve was obtained from photometric observations taken by astronomers Brian Warner at the Palmer Divide Observatory, Colorado, by Petr Pravec and Peter Kušnirák at Ondřejov Observatory, Czech Republic, by Adrián Galád and Štefan Gajdoš at Modra Observatory, Slovakia, and by P. Brown and Z. Krzeminski of the Department of Physics and Astronomy at UWO in Ontario, Canada.

These observations revealed, that Johnson is a synchronous binary asteroid with a moon orbiting its primary every 21.785 hours. The observed mutual asteroid occultation and eclipsing events had a magnitude of between 0.15 and 0.18 magnitude, suggesting that the satellite's diameter measures 40% of that of Johnson (a secondary-to-primary diameter ratio of 0.4), which translates into a mean diameter of 1.4–1.9 kilometer.

Since Johnson's first observation in April 2005, astronomer Brian Warner and Petr Pravec have obtained additional lightcurves. (Note: List of 8 lightcurve plots of (5905) Johnson: a · b · c · d · e · f · g · h. Source: unpublished periods of asteroids at the Ondrejov NEO Photometric Program) They gave a revised rotation period for the primary of 3.7814 to 3.7824 hours with a brightness variation between 0.10 and 0.20 magnitude (U=3/3/3/3/3). These observations also confirmed that Johnson is a binary system, giving a concurring orbital period of 21.78 to 21.797 hours for the satellite. For an asteroid of its size, Johnson has a somewhat fast spin rate, but still significantly above those of fast rotators. CALL adopts a rotation period of 3.7824 hours with an amplitude of 0.20 magnitude.

== Naming ==
This minor planet was named after American astronomer and engineer Lindley N. Johnson at NASA's Jet Propulsion Laboratory. A space enthusiast since the age of 12, Johnson has been instrumental for the Near-Earth Asteroid Tracking program, which became operational at GEODSS on Hawaii (Haleakala-NEAT; 566) in December 1995. The approved naming citation was published by the Minor Planet Center on 3 May 1996 (M.P.C. 27128).
