= 1719 Jens =

Main-belt asteroid

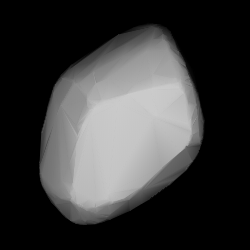
- Shape model of Jens from its lightcurve

Discovery
- Discovered by: K. Reinmuth
- Discovery site: Heidelberg Obs.
- Discovery date: 17 February 1950

Designations
- Named after: Jens (discoverer's grandson)
- Alternative designations: 1950 DP · 1939 PP; 1939 TD · 1941 BB; 1948 RQ · 1948 RS_{1} 1948 TS_{1} · 1961 TZ_{1} A922 SC
- Minor planet category: main-belt · (middle)

Orbital characteristics
- Epoch 4 September 2017 (JD 2458000.5)
- Uncertainty parameter 0
- Observation arc: 68.65 yr (25,074 days)
- Aphelion: 3.2474 AU
- Perihelion: 2.0649 AU
- Semi-major axis: 2.6562 AU
- Eccentricity: 0.2226
- Orbital period (sidereal): 4.33 yr (1,581 days)
- Mean anomaly: 321.62°
- Mean motion: 0° 13^{m} 39.72^{s} / day
- Inclination: 14.281°
- Longitude of ascending node: 323.44°
- Argument of perihelion: 58.096°

Physical characteristics
- Dimensions: 18.76 km (derived); 18.93±0.9 km 19.77±0.76 km 19.914±0.070 km 21.610±0.086
- Synodic rotation period: 5.867±0.005 h 5.87±0.01 h 5.87016±0.00005 h 5.873±0.005 h
- Geometric albedo: 0.085±0.011; 0.1048 (derived); 0.1348±0.0306; 0.137±0.021; 0.1489±0.015
- Spectral type: C · S
- Absolute magnitude (H): 11.3 · 11.7 · 12.04±1.20

1719 Jens (prov. designation: 1950 DP) is a background asteroid from the central region of the asteroid belt, approximately 19 kilometers in diameter. It was discovered on 17 February 1950, by German astronomer Karl Reinmuth at Heidelberg Observatory in southern Germany. It was named after a grandson of the discoverer.

== Orbit and classification ==
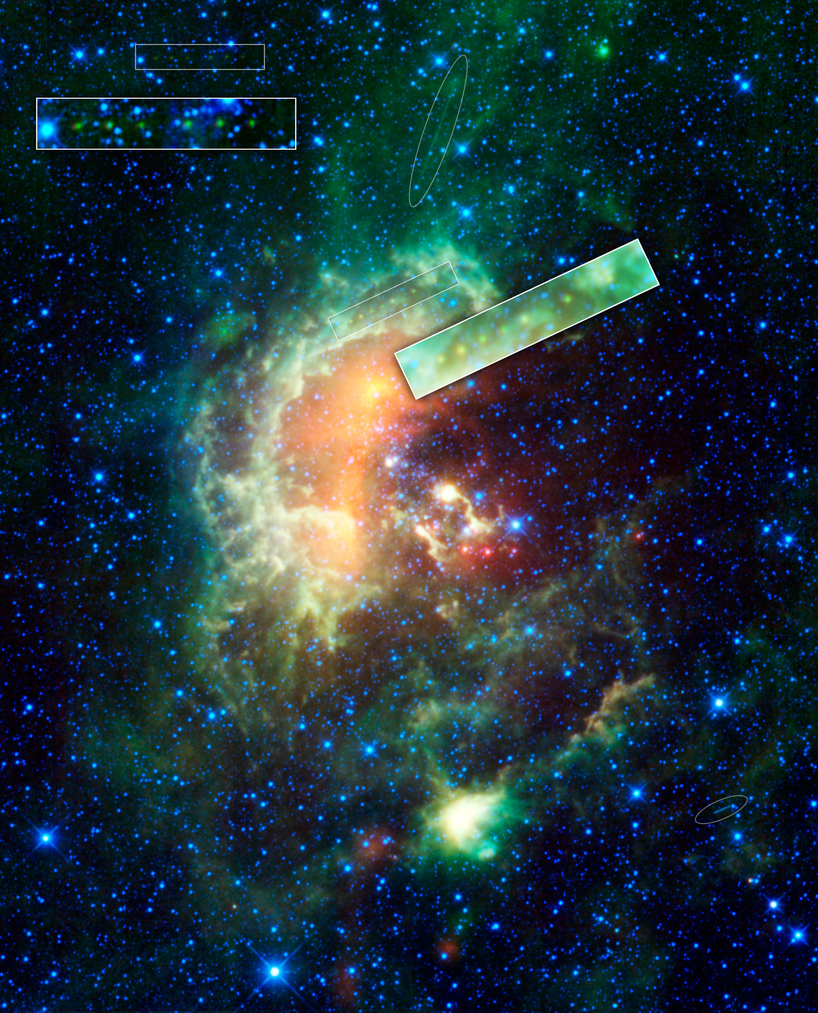
Jens (yellow-green dots) transists near the center of the Tadpole Nebula.

Jens orbits the Sun in the central main-belt at a distance of 2.1–3.2 AU once every 4 years and 4 months (1,581 days). Its orbit has an eccentricity of 0.22 and an inclination of 14° with respect to the ecliptic. First identified as A922 SC at Simeiz Observatory in 1922, Jens's first used observation was taken at Turku in 1948, extending the body's observation arc by 2 years prior to its official discovery observation.

In 2010, Jens was passing in front of the Tadpole Nebula (see image obtained by WISE).

== Physical characteristics ==
=== Lightcurves ===
In September 2000, American astronomer Brian Warner obtained two rotational lightcurves, giving a rotation period of 5.867 and 5.87 hours with a brightness variation of 0.50 and 0.55 magnitude, respectively (U=3/3).

In February 2006, photometric observations by French amateur astronomer Laurent Bernasconi gave a concurring period of 5.873 hours with an amplitude of 0.55 magnitude (U=3). This well-defined period was further confirmed by a modeled light-curve using data from the Lowell Photometric Database, giving a period of 5.87016 hours (U=n.a.).

=== Spectral type ===
It is classified as S- and C-type asteroid by the LCDB and Pan-STARRS, respectively.

=== Diameter and albedo ===
According to the surveys carried out by the Infrared Astronomical Satellite IRAS and NASA's Wide-field Infrared Survey Explorer with its subsequent NEOWISE mission, Jens measures between 18.93 and 21.61 kilometers in diameter and its surface has an albedo between 0.085 and 0.149. The Collaborative Asteroid Lightcurve Link derives an albedo of 0.1048 and calculates a diameter of 18.76 kilometers based on an absolute magnitude of 11.7.

== Naming ==
This minor planet was named by the discoverer for his grandson. Karl Reinmuth also named the consecutively numbered asteroid, 1720 Niels, after one of his grandsons. The official naming citation was published by the Minor Planet Center on 20 February 1976 (M.P.C. 3933).
