= Janequeo (lonco) =

Janequeo or Yanequén, (fl. 1587–1590) was a lonco (chief) and heroine of the Mapuche-Pehuenche people. She was the wife of the lonco Huepotaén, chief of Llifén, who was killed after being tortured by order of Governor Alonso de Sotomayor. She succeeded him as lonco, in command of the struggle against the Spanish. At the head of troops of warriors, she killed many Spanish troops in various battles. Infamously, she eventually speared a Spanish commander, Aranda, through the head.

Tradition states that she died of typhus.

Figures such as Juan Egaña viewed her as "the most accomplished military leader of her region's history".
