= 5899 Jedicke =

Main-belt asteroid binary

Discovery
- Discovered by: C. Shoemaker
- Discovery site: Palomar Obs.
- Discovery date: 9 January 1986

Designations
- Named after: The Jedicke family: Robert, Peter, and June (Canadian astronomers)
- Alternative designations: 1986 AH · 1978 EW_{3} 1986 AR_{1}
- Minor planet category: main-belt · (inner) · Hungaria

Orbital characteristics
- Epoch 4 September 2017 (JD 2458000.5)
- Uncertainty parameter 0
- Observation arc: 38.40 yr (14,024 days)
- Aphelion: 2.1544 AU
- Perihelion: 1.7029 AU
- Semi-major axis: 1.9287 AU
- Eccentricity: 0.1171
- Orbital period (sidereal): 2.68 yr (978 days)
- Mean anomaly: 14.458°
- Mean motion: 0° 22^{m} 4.8^{s} / day
- Inclination: 24.006°
- Longitude of ascending node: 125.34°
- Argument of perihelion: 263.69°
- Known satellites: 1 (P: 16.7 h; s; D_{s}/_{p} ≥ 0.32)

Physical characteristics
- Dimensions: 2.672±0.172 km 3.51 km (calculated)
- Synodic rotation period: 2.730±0.0004 h 2.7481 h 2.751±0.001 h 3.66 h 3.66±0.01 h
- Geometric albedo: 0.30 (assumed); 0.621±0.182
- Spectral type: E
- Absolute magnitude (H): 14.0 · 14.2 · 14.36±0.47

5899 Jedicke, provisional designation 1986 AH, is a binary Hungaria asteroid approximately 3 kilometers in diameter. It was discovered on 9 January 1986, by American astronomer Carolyn Shoemaker at Palomar Observatory, and named after the members of the Canadian Jedicke family.

== Classification and orbit ==
Jedicke is a bright E-type asteroid and member of the Hungaria family, which form the innermost dense concentration of asteroids in the Solar System. It orbits the Sun in the inner main-belt at a distance of 1.7–2.2 AU once every 2 years and 8 months (978 days). Its orbit has an eccentricity of 0.12 and an inclination of 24° with respect to the ecliptic. It was first identified as 1978 EW_{3} at Crimea–Nauchnij in 1978, extending the body's observation arc by 10 years prior to its official discovery observation at Palomar.

== Physical characteristics ==
=== Primary ===
According to the survey carried out by NASA's Wide-field Infrared Survey Explorer with its subsequent NEOWISE mission, Jedicke ("primary") measures 2.672 kilometers in diameter and its surface has a very high albedo of 0.621. The Collaborative Asteroid Lightcurve Link assumes an albedo of 0.30 – a compromise value between 0.4 and 0.2, corresponding to the Hungaria asteroids both as family and orbital group – and calculates a diameter of 3.51 kilometers with an absolute magnitude of 14.2.

Between February 2010, and April 2016, astronomer Brian Warner obtained several rotational lightcurves of Jedicke from photometric observations at his Palmer Divide Station in Colorado, United States. Best rated lightcurve analysis from March 2013, gave a refined rotation period of 2.7481 hours with a brightness amplitude of 0.11 magnitude, superseding a preliminary estimate of 3–4 hours. However, an alternative period of 3.076 hours was found again in 2015, without any plausible explanation for a sudden 0.03 hour slowing, that apparently took place between 2011 and 2012 (U=2+/3/2/2+).

=== Moon ===
During Brian Warner's initial photometric observation in February 2010 – carried out in collaboration with mentor Alan W. Harris at the Space Science Institute in La Canada, California, Petr Pravec at Ondřejov Observatory in the Czech Republic, and Joseph T. Pollock at Appalachian State University, North Carolina – it was revealed that Jedicke is a synchronous binary system with a minor-planet moon orbiting it every 16.7 hours.

Based on the observed mutual eclipse/occultation events, the satellite diameter measures at least 32% of that of Jedicke (i.e. a secondary-to-primary mean-diameter ratio of ≥ 0.32), which translates into a diameter of 0.8–1.1 kilometers, depending on the underling size estimate of its primary. The "Johnstonsarchive" estimates that the moon has a semi-major axis of 4.4 kilometers.

== Naming ==
This minor planet was named for the Canadian Jedicke family, notably Peter Jedicke (born 1955), Robert Jedicke (born 1963), and June Jedicke-Zehr (born 1966). Peter is a retired teacher of astronomy and physics at Fanshawe College, President of the Royal Astronomical Society of Canada, and one of Canada's best known amateur astronomers. Robert is a physicist and participant in the Spacewatch survey, who discovered the Jupiter-family comets 179P/Jedicke (P/1995 A1) and 269P/Jedicke (P/1996 A1). June Zehr has often shared observing sessions with her two brothers.

Name suggested and citation prepared by Canadian astronomer David H. Levy. The approved naming citation was published by the Minor Planet Center on 12 July 1995 (M.P.C. 25444).
