= National Astronomical Observatory (Chile) =

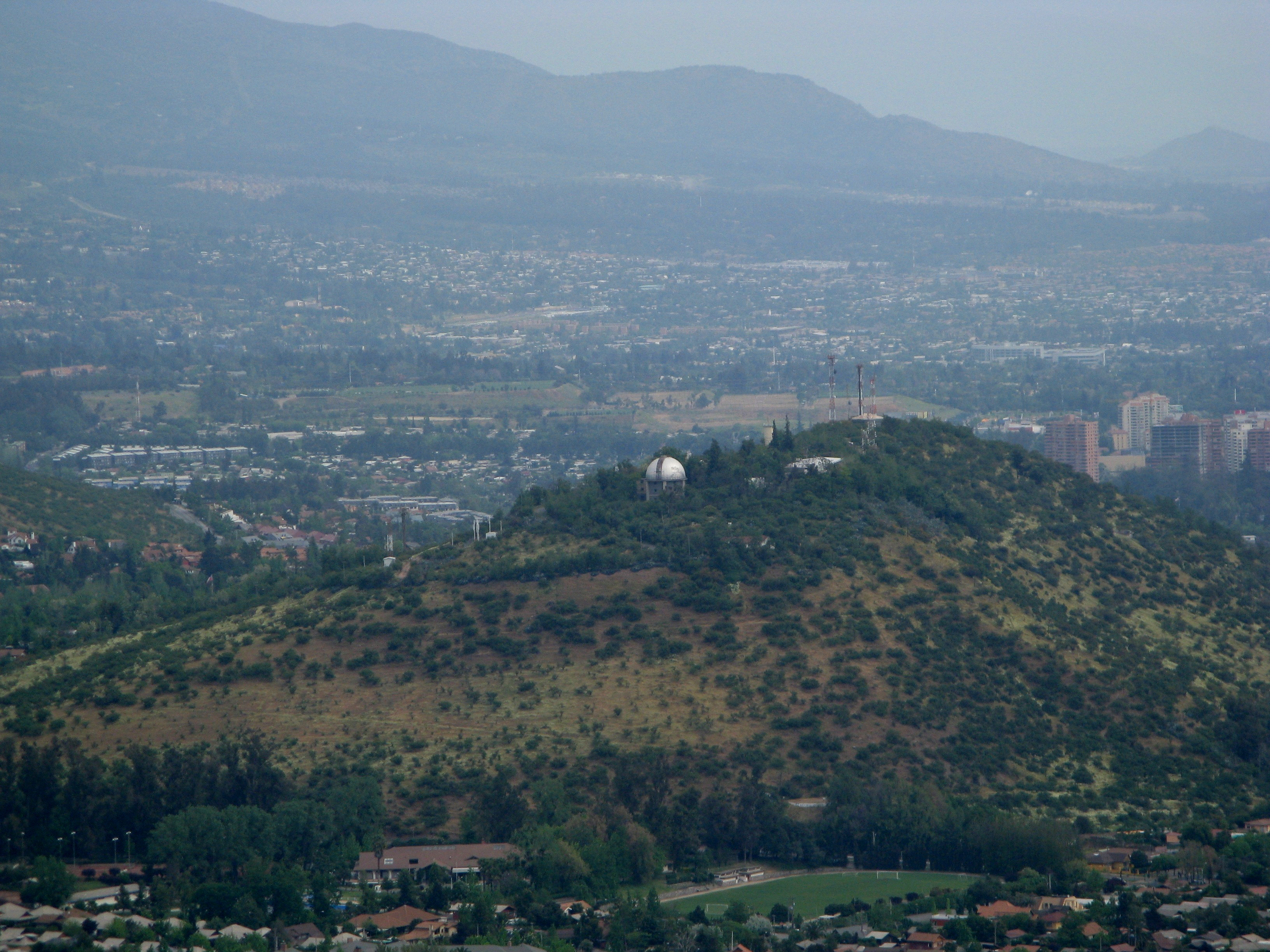
- Cerro Calán
- Alternative names: Cerro Calán Observatory
- Organization: University of Chile
- Observatory code: 805, 806, 813, 815
- Location: Las Condes, Chile
- Coordinates: 33.3961°S 70.5367°W
- Altitude: 853 metres (2,799 ft)
- Established: 1852
- Website: Observatorio Astronómico Nacional

Telescopes
- MINI: 1.2 radio telescope
- unnamed telescope: 0.45 m reflector
- Related media on Commons

The National Astronomical Observatory of Chile (Spanish: Observatorio Astronómico Nacional de Chile - OAN) is an astronomical observatory owned and operated by the Department of Astronomy of the University of Chile (UCh). It is located on Cerro Calán, a hill in the commune of Las Condes. The commune is an eastern suburb of Santiago located in Santiago Province of the Santiago Metropolitan Region. OAN was founded in 1852 and became a part of UCh in 1927. The facility on Cerro Calán was completed in 1962.

== History ==
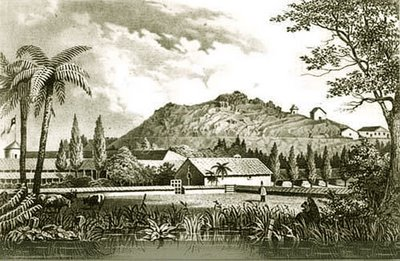
Santa Lucia Hill c. 1850

The National Astronomical Observatory of Chile (OAN) can be traced back to the Gillis Expedition, a project of the United States Naval Observatory, led by James Melville Gilliss, who arrived in Chile in 1849 to observe Mars and Venus from the southern hemisphere so as to improve solar parallax. Gilliss and his party set up their equipment on Santa Lucia Hill, a small rise in downtown Santiago. After completing the project in 1852, Gilliss sold the equipment and the buildings which housed it to the Government of Chile, which formed OAN at that time.

After two years of operating on Santa Lucia Hill, the director of the new observatory, Carlos Guillermo Moesta, noticed that daytime heating of the dark rock of the hill caused the entire landform to move slightly. As a result of this discovery Moesta decided it would be best to move the observatory elsewhere. A new facility was built in what is now Quinta Normal starting in 1857, and OAN officially moved to the new location in 1862. However, it proved to be one of the foggiest locations in the area. The building is now home to the Aeronautical Technical School of the Civil Aviation Authority of Chile.

=== 20th century ===
In 1908, President Pedro Montt appointed Friedrich Wilhelm Ristenpart of Germany director of OAN. Ristenpart organized another move of the observatory, this time to what is now the suburb of Lo Espejo, south of Santiago. Ristenpart died in 1913, and the subsequent director, Alberto Obrecht, completed the move in 1916. The buildings in Lo Espejo have been torn down.

Federico Rutllant became director in 1950, and in 1956 the observatory began a new campus on Cerro Calán under his direction. The transfer was completed in 1962. Rutllant played an important part in bringing foreigners in to build the big observatories in the Atacama Desert in the 1960s. The extensive site research for what would soon become Cerro Tololo Inter-American Observatory and La Silla Observatory was conducted while he was director. In 1963, he resigned his position and the University of Chile, presumably for embezzlement of funds from AURA and other international institutions. Beginning in 1962, the Soviet Union also sent astronomers and provided several telescopes to OAN, but it withdrew after the 1973 Chilean coup d'état.

=== Cerro El Roble Station ===
Cerro El Roble Station (Spanish: Estación Astronómica de Cerro El Roble, also known as Cerro El Roble Observatory; observatory code: 805), is a site of Chile's National Astronomical Observatory located on Cerro El Roble, a mountain on the border between Santiago Metropolitan Region and Valparaíso Region. The observatory building sits at an elevation of 2,200 metres (7,200 ft) and is approximately 63 kilometres (39 mi) northwest of Santiago. It was built by the University of Chile in 1967 to house a 70 cm (28 in) Maksutov telescope provided by the Soviet Union, which began operating in 1968.

=== Maipú Radio Observatory ===
Maipú Radio Observatory (Spanish: Radio Observatorio de Maipú - ROM, or Observatorio Radioastronomico de Maipú) was a remote site of OAN located in the commune of Maipú southwest of Santiago. One long-wavelength telescope was built by OAN and the University of Florida, and another by OAN and the Carnegie Institution. Observing began at the site in 1959, and it was closed in 2000.

== Telescopes ==
=== Active telescopes ===
- The 1.2 m (47 in) Millimeter-wave Telescope (MINI) is a Cassegrain reflector with a primary mirror made of machined aluminum. It was installed at CTIO in 1982, and an identical telescope is located at the Center for Astrophysics | Harvard & Smithsonian. It was used for surveys of molecular clouds while at CTIO. In 2005 it was moved to the Chilean National Astronomical Observatory's facilities on Cerro Calán near Santiago, where it was installed in a newly constructed dome in 2011.
- GOTO Telescope: A 0.45 m (18 in) Cassegrain reflector made by Goto was purchased with a grant given to OAN by the Japanese government in 2002. It is housed in a building with a roll-off roof built when the campus was founded. It is used for instruction of undergraduates and outreach.
- Heyde Telescope: A 28 cm (11 in) refractor built by Gustav Heyde (Dresden, Germany), originally installed at Lo Espejo in 1913. It was moved to Cerro Calán, where it is now used for outreach.
- Gautier Telescope: A 28 cm (11 in) refractor built by Gautier was installed in 1894 at Quinta Normal. It is a Carte du Ciel-type astrograph and created over 1,000 astronomical glass plates. It was moved to Lo Espejo and then Cerro Calán, where it is now used for outreach.
- A Danjon astrolabe with a 10 cm (3.9 in) aperture was installed on Cerro Calán in 1965 for a joint project of UCh and the European Southern Observatory. It was modified to allow solar observations in 1989.

=== Former telescopes ===
- A 18 cm (7.1 in) transit telescope built at Pulkovo Observatory was installed in 1963. It was housed in a metal building which was also made at Pulkovo and shipped to Chile in parts.
- A 60 cm (24 in) refractor built by Grubb was ordered in 1909. The dome was in place by 1913, but the final parts for the telescope did not arrive until 1933. It was finally finished, but did not work satisfactorily so was seldom used. The dome was moved to Cerro Calán but the telescope was never installed at the new facility.
- A 9 cm (3.5 in) Bamberg transit telescope was purchased in 1910.
- A 19 cm (7.5 in) meridian circle built by Repsold was first installed at Lo Espejo in 1912. It was moved to Cerro Calán and was used as recently as the 1990s.
- A 18 cm (7.1 in) meridian circle built by Eichens was acquired between 1865 and 1889.
- A 24 cm (9.4 in) meridian circle built by Repsold was acquired around 1873 but not put into use until 1883.
- A 16 cm (6.3 in) refractor built by Henry Fitz was sold by Gillis to OAN in 1852.
- An 11 cm (4.3 in) meridian circle by built Pistor and Martins was sold by Gillis to OAN in 1852.

== See also ==
- List of astronomical observatories
