= Meanings of minor-planet names: 117001–118000 =

As minor planet discoveries are confirmed, they are given a permanent number by the IAU's Minor Planet Center (MPC), and the discoverers can then submit names for them, following the IAU's naming conventions. The list below concerns those minor planets in the specified number-range that have received names, and explains the meanings of those names.

Official naming citations of newly named small Solar System bodies are approved and published in a bulletin by IAU's Working Group for Small Bodies Nomenclature (WGSBN). Before May 2021, citations were published in MPC's Minor Planet Circulars for many decades. Recent citations can also be found on the JPL Small-Body Database (SBDB). Until his death in 2016, German astronomer Lutz D. Schmadel compiled these citations into the Dictionary of Minor Planet Names (DMP) and regularly updated the collection.

Based on Paul Herget's The Names of the Minor Planets, Schmadel also researched the unclear origin of numerous asteroids, most of which had been named prior to World War II. This article incorporates text from this source, which is in the public domain: SBDB New namings may only be added to this list below after official publication as the preannouncement of names is condemned. The WGSBN publishes a comprehensive guideline for the naming rules of non-cometary small Solar System bodies.

== 117001–117100 ==
Named minor planet	Provisional	This minor planet was named for...	Ref · Catalog
117020 Janeconlin	2004 JC_{10}	Jane Conlin (born 1946), an American activist and humanitarian who has sponsored several of the original Sudanese lost boys. She also works as a group leader for Citizens Climate Lobby in Arizona.	JPL · 117020
117032 Davidlane	2004 JN_{20}	David Lane (born 1963), a Canadian amateur astronomer, supernova hunter, and author of The Earth Centered Universe (a planetarium and telescope-control program)	JPL · 117032
117086 Lóczy	2004 LZ_{23}	Lajos Lóczy (1849–1920), a Hungarian geologist, first western geologist to describe the structure, geomorphology and stratigraphy of the mountain chains bordering the Tibetan Plateau	JPL · 117086
117093 Umbria	2004 NE_{9}	The Italian region of Umbria is characterized by rolling green hills and medieval cities rich in history and traditions.	JPL · 117093

== 117101–117200 ==
back to top

Named minor planet	Provisional	This minor planet was named for...	Ref · Catalog
117156 Altschwendt	2004 QV_{7}	The Austrian village of Altschwendt, where the Altschwendt Observatory (A44) is located. It was the first made minor-planet discovery at the observatory.	JPL · 117156

== 117201–117300 ==
back to top

Named minor planet	Provisional	This minor planet was named for...	Ref · Catalog
117240 Zhytomyr	2004 SX_{19}	Zhytomyr, Ukraine, the oblast in which Andrushivka, the discovery site, is found, and the birthplace of Sergej Korolev, Russian rocket engineer	JPL · 117240

== 117301–117400 ==
back to top

Named minor planet	Provisional	This minor planet was named for...	Ref · Catalog
117329 Spencer	2004 XJ_{6}	Henry Spencer (born 1955), Canadian computer scientist and small-satellite engineer	JPL · 117329
117350 Saburo	2004 XL_{62}	Saburo Itagaki (1916–1983), father of Japanese amateur astronomer Kōichi Itagaki who discovered this minor planet	JPL · 117350
117381 Lindaweiland	2004 YU	Linda Weiland, American zoning administrator of Cochise County, Arizona, who has campaigned against light pollution	JPL · 117381
117384 Halharrison	2004 YD_{16}	Hal Harrison (born 1947) is an amateur astronomer and photographer and has always been fascinated by planetary science and astronomy.	JPL · 117384
117385 Maughan	2004 YN_{20}	Margaret Gardner Maughan, British Paralympian	IAU · 117385
117386 Thomasschlapkohl	2004 YV_{20}	Thomas Schlapkohl (born 1987) is a guidance, navigation and control engineer at Lockheed Martin for the OSIRIS-REx asteroid sample-return mission.	JPL · 117386
117387 Javiercerna	2004 YP_{21}	Javier Cerna (born 1981), a Telecom engineer for the OSIRIS-REx asteroid sample-return mission. He was also a Telecom engineer on the GRAIL Discovery program and InSight Mars-lander.	JPL · 117387
117388 Jamiemoore	2004 YB_{23}	Jamie Moore (born 1986), a flight system contamination control engineer and spacecraft-curation interface at Lockheed Martin for the OSIRIS-REx asteroid sample-return mission. She has supported multiple NASA interplanetary missions helping to ensure that contamination control requirements are met.	JPL · 117388
117390 Stephanegendron	2004 YK_{26}	Stéphane Gendron (born 1963) is Materials and Thermal Engineer at the Canadian Space Agency (CSA) and he acted as the CSA Thermal Engineer in the project OLA, a sophisticated Lidar instrument provided by CSA for the OSIRIS-REx asteroid sample-return mission.	JPL · 117390

== 117401–117500 ==
back to top

Named minor planet	Provisional	This minor planet was named for...	Ref · Catalog
117406 Blasgámez	2005 AF_{10}	Blas Gámez Ortiz (1966–2017), a decorated officer of the Spanish National Police Corps, who was killed in the line of duty.	IAU · 117406
117411 Adellehelble	2005 AH_{12}	Adelle Helble, American engineer who served as Acting Program Manager for NASA’s Near-Earth Object Observations Program.	IAU · 117411
117413 Ramonycajal	2005 AE_{13}	Santiago Ramón y Cajal (1852–1934), Spanish physician and Nobel laureate	JPL · 117413
117430 Achosyx	2005 AQ_{26}	"Achosyx", (French pronunciation of "H-O-6"), is the IAU observatory code (H06) of the discovering Rent-A-Scope Observatory (Remote Astronomy Society Observatory) located in Mayhill, New Mexico.	JPL · 117430
117435 Severochoa	2005 AJ_{29}	Severo Ochoa (1905–1993), Spanish-born American biochemist and winner of the 1959 Nobel Prize for Physiology or Medicine	JPL · 117435
117439 Rosner	2005 AR_{36}	Arnie and Nancy Rosner, American photographers from Fountain Valley, California. Arnie is an astrophotographer; and Nancy is a travel photographer.	JPL · 117439

== 117501–117600 ==
back to top

Named minor planet	Provisional	This minor planet was named for...	Ref · Catalog
117506 Wildberg	2005 CO_{25}	The German town of Wildberg, where the Wildberg Observatory (198) is located	JPL · 117506
117539 Celletti	2005 DJ_{1}	Alessandra Celletti (born 1962), Italian mathematician who teaches celestial mechanics at University of Rome Tor Vergata	JPL · 117539
117562 Jeffreyferguson	2005 EB_{25}	Jeffrey Ferguson (b. 1964), an American physician.	IAU · 117562
117563 Hollyoscarson	2005 EK_{25}	Holly Oscarson (b. 1985), an American surgical assistant.	IAU · 117563
117565 Alanstrauss	2005 EN_{29}	Alan Strauss (b. 1969), an American educator.	IAU · 117565
117568 Yadame	2005 EK_{30}	Yadame Yoshikazu (born 1943), a farmer in the Kitami region of Hokkaido, founded the Kitami Astronomical Society in 1963	JPL · 117568
117569 Rileyharris	2005 EO_{32}	Riley Harris (b. 1942), an American educator.	IAU · 117569
117572 Hutsebaut	2005 EX_{33}	Robert Hutsebaut (born 1941), Belgian amateur astronomer and a discoverer of minor planets	JPL · 117572
117581 Devinschrader	2005 EG_{37}	Devin Schrader (born 1984) is a meteoriticist and cosmochemist, and is an assistant director of the Center for Meteorite Studies at Arizona State University and a science collaborator with the Carbonaceous Meteorite Working Group for the OSIRIS-REx asteroid sample-return mission.	JPL · 117581
117582 Kenjikawai	2005 ED_{39}	Kenji Kawai (born 1957) is a Japanese composer, musician, and conductor who has written music for numerous movies, television programs and video games.	JPL · 117582
117586 Twilatho	2005 EV_{43}	Twila Gore Peck (born 1949) and Thom Peck (born 1950), American astronomy communicators. Thom has been president of astronomy clubs in several cities, while Twila has organized observing sessions and public astronomy events.	JPL · 117586
117595 Jemmadavidson	2005 EG_{62}	Jemma Davidson (born 1984) is a cosmochemist and meteoriticist specializing in the study of presolar grains and pristine chondrites to determine how minor bodies formed and evolved in the early Solar System. She was previously a Science Team collaborator and webmaster for the OSIRIS-REx asteroid sample-return mission.	JPL · 117595
117596 Richardkuhns	2005 EK_{64}	Richard Kuhns (born 1972), manager with the OSIRIS-REx asteroid sample-return mission for the Lockheed Martin Space Systems Company. Previously he was the avionics manager for the WorldView-4 (GeoEye-2) spacecraft, and a manager for Lockheed Martin Coherent Technologies. His experience includes work in machine vision and adaptive optics.	JPL · 117596

== 117601–117700 ==
back to top

Named minor planet	Provisional	This minor planet was named for...	Ref · Catalog
117610 Keithmahoney	2005 ES_{91}	Keith Mahoney (born 1970) was the flight system Guidance, Navigation, and Control LIDAR engineer at Lockheed Martin for the OSIRIS-REx asteroid sample-return mission.	JPL · 117610
117614 Hannahmclain	2005 EU_{94}	Hannah McLain (born 1985) is an astrobiologist at the Goddard Space Flight Center supporting organic contamination analysis for the OSIRIS-REx asteroid sample-return mission.	JPL · 117614
117640 Millsellie	2005 EK_{137}	Amelia Lucas (born 2014) and Eloise Thornton (born 2014) were born during the OSIRIS-REx asteroid sample-return mission. Mills, daughter of Kristen and Scott Lucas, and Ellie, daughter of Jennifer and Kevin Thornton, enjoy exploring new frontiers, hearing about the universe, and looking at stars with their grandparents Thomas and Karen Connors.	JPL · 117640
117652 Joséaponte	2005 EY_{161}	José Aponte (born 1981) is an astrobiologist at the Goddard Space Flight Center for the OSIRIS-REx asteroid sample-return mission. His research emphasis is in organic chemistry in meteorites.	JPL · 117652
117657 Jamieelsila	2005 EP_{187}	Jamie Elsila (born 1974) is an astrobiologist at the Goddard Space Flight Center for the OSIRIS-REx asteroid sample-return mission. Her research emphasis is in organic chemistry in meteorites and in spacecraft-returned samples from asteroids and comets.	JPL · 117657

== 117701–117800 ==
back to top

Named minor planet	Provisional	This minor planet was named for...	Ref · Catalog
117703 Ochoa	2005 EK_{300}	Ellen Ochoa (born 1958) is a former American Astronaut. In 1993, she was the first Hispanic woman to go to space. She flew four space shuttle missions, logged nearly 1000 hours in space, and became Director of the Johnson Space Center.	JPL · 117703
117704 Lopez-Alegria	2005 EN_{317}	Michael Lopez-Alegria (born 1958) is a retired astronaut who flew on four NASA missions aboard the Space Shuttle, the Soyuz spacecraft and the International Space Station. He performed ten spacewalks over his 257 days in space. While in space, he performed experiments on materials, biotechnology and combustion.	JPL · 117704
117711 Degenfeld	2005 GA	Berta Degenfeld-Schomburg (1843–1928), Hungarian amateur astronomer who took part in the work of the Kiskartal Observatory	JPL · 117711
117712 Podmaniczky	2005 GD	Baron Géza Podmaniczky (1839–1923), Hungarian landowner and amateur astronomer	JPL · 117712
117713 Kövesligethy	2005 GG_{1}	Radó Kövesligethy (1862–1924), Hungarian astronomer and geophysicist	JPL · 117713
117714 Kiskartal	2005 GH_{1}	Kiskartal Observatory was founded by Baron Géza Podmaniczky (see above) in 1884	JPL · 117714
117715 Carlkirby	2005 GK_{1}	Carl Kirby (born 1949), American amateur astronomer	JPL · 117715
117736 Sherrod	2005 GQ_{22}	Clay Sherrod (born 1949), American archaeologist, biomedical researcher, founder and director of the Arkansas Sky Observatory (H45)	JPL · 117736
117757 Waltermassey	2005 GD_{59}	Named to honor American physicist and NSF Vannevar Bush Award winner Walter Eugene Massey (b. 1938).	JPL · 117757
117781 Jamesfisher	2005 GF_{115}	James Randall Fisher (born 1942), an author and Professor of English who earned a PhD at the University of Southern California	JPL · 117781
117783 Indik	2005 GJ_{118}	Julia Heisler Indik, American professor of medicine at the University of Arizona's College of Medicine, Tucson.	IAU · 117783

== 117801–117900 ==
back to top

Named minor planet	Provisional	This minor planet was named for...	Ref · Catalog
117852 Constance	2005 JG_{151}	Constance L. Martin-Trembley (born 1962) has been a beloved and inspirational science teacher for over a decade. Connie has organized educational trips, run an after school book club and science club, and has a passion for astronomy. She was awarded Teacher of the year for her district in 2007.	JPL · 117852
117874 Picodelteide	2511 P-L	Pico del Teide, active volcano on Tenerife, one of the Spanish Canary Islands.	JPL · 117874

== 117901–118000 ==
back to top

Named minor planet	Provisional	This minor planet was named for...	Ref · Catalog
117993 Zambujal	1064 T-2	Zambujal, Portugal, chalcolithic archaeological site	JPL · 117993
117997 Irazú	1090 T-2	Irazú, the 3432-m active volcano in Costa Rica.	JPL · 117997

back to top

Preceded by 116,001–117,000	Meanings of minor-planet names List of minor planets: 117,001–118,000	Succeeded by 118,001–119,000
