= List of minor planets: 117001–118000 =

The following is a partial list of minor planets, running from minor-planet number 117001 through 118000, inclusive. The primary data for this and other partial lists is based on JPL's "Small-Body Orbital Elements" and data available from the Minor Planet Center. Critical list information is also provided by the MPC, unless otherwise specified from Lowell Observatory. A detailed description of the table's columns and additional sources are given on the main page including a complete list of every page in this series, and a statistical break-up on the dynamical classification of minor planets.

Also see the summary list of all named bodies in numerical and alphabetical order, and the corresponding naming citations for the number range of this particular list. New namings may only be added to this list after official publication, as the preannouncement of names is condemned by the Working Group for Small Bodies Nomenclature of the International Astronomical Union.

Near-Earth obj.	MBA (inner)	MBA (outer)	Centaur
Mars-crosser	MBA (middle)	Jupiter trojan	Trans-Neptunian obj.
Unclassified

== 117001–117100 ==
Designation			Discovery			Properties		Ref
Permanent	Provisional	Named after	Date	Site	Discoverer(s)	Category	Diam.	Ref
117001	2004 HX_{55}	—	April 24, 2004	Socorro	LINEAR	ADE	3.0 km	MPC · JPL
117002	2004 HY_{59}	—	April 23, 2004	Socorro	LINEAR	V	1.2 km	MPC · JPL
117003	2004 HZ_{59}	—	April 23, 2004	Socorro	LINEAR	·	1.5 km	MPC · JPL
117004	2004 HG_{60}	—	April 25, 2004	Socorro	LINEAR	·	3.3 km	MPC · JPL
117005	2004 HU_{60}	—	April 25, 2004	Bergisch Gladbach	W. Bickel	EUN	3.2 km	MPC · JPL
117006	2004 HD_{61}	—	April 25, 2004	Socorro	LINEAR	·	2.4 km	MPC · JPL
117007	2004 HE_{61}	—	April 25, 2004	Socorro	LINEAR	HYG	5.1 km	MPC · JPL
117008	2004 HS_{62}	—	April 26, 2004	Kitt Peak	Spacewatch	·	3.4 km	MPC · JPL
117009	2004 HX_{63}	—	April 16, 2004	Socorro	LINEAR	EUN	2.7 km	MPC · JPL
117010	2004 JG_{1}	—	May 10, 2004	Catalina	CSS	·	6.5 km	MPC · JPL
117011	2004 JZ_{2}	—	May 9, 2004	Palomar	NEAT	THM	3.7 km	MPC · JPL
117012	2004 JZ_{4}	—	May 11, 2004	Reedy Creek	J. Broughton	·	4.0 km	MPC · JPL
117013	2004 JA_{5}	—	May 12, 2004	Reedy Creek	J. Broughton	·	3.1 km	MPC · JPL
117014	2004 JG_{5}	—	May 8, 2004	Palomar	NEAT	·	3.1 km	MPC · JPL
117015	2004 JR_{6}	—	May 10, 2004	Palomar	NEAT	·	3.1 km	MPC · JPL
117016	2004 JH_{8}	—	May 12, 2004	Catalina	CSS	·	5.6 km	MPC · JPL
117017	2004 JN_{8}	—	May 12, 2004	Catalina	CSS	·	6.6 km	MPC · JPL
117018	2004 JB_{9}	—	May 13, 2004	Palomar	NEAT	·	2.9 km	MPC · JPL
117019	2004 JB_{10}	—	May 9, 2004	Haleakala	NEAT	EOS	4.0 km	MPC · JPL
117020 Janeconlin	2004 JC_{10}	Janeconlin	May 10, 2004	Catalina	CSS	·	4.6 km	MPC · JPL
117021	2004 JH_{10}	—	May 10, 2004	Palomar	NEAT	·	4.2 km	MPC · JPL
117022	2004 JX_{10}	—	May 12, 2004	Catalina	CSS	·	3.8 km	MPC · JPL
117023	2004 JY_{10}	—	May 12, 2004	Catalina	CSS	·	7.3 km	MPC · JPL
117024	2004 JF_{11}	—	May 12, 2004	Catalina	CSS	·	2.4 km	MPC · JPL
117025	2004 JH_{11}	—	May 12, 2004	Catalina	CSS	·	3.6 km	MPC · JPL
117026	2004 JN_{12}	—	May 13, 2004	Socorro	LINEAR	·	8.2 km	MPC · JPL
117027	2004 JS_{12}	—	May 13, 2004	Reedy Creek	J. Broughton	·	5.8 km	MPC · JPL
117028	2004 JW_{12}	—	May 13, 2004	Reedy Creek	J. Broughton	HYG	6.5 km	MPC · JPL
117029	2004 JG_{15}	—	May 10, 2004	Palomar	NEAT	·	3.3 km	MPC · JPL
117030	2004 JJ_{15}	—	May 10, 2004	Palomar	NEAT	·	2.6 km	MPC · JPL
117031	2004 JK_{17}	—	May 12, 2004	Siding Spring	SSS	·	2.2 km	MPC · JPL
117032 Davidlane	2004 JN_{20}	Davidlane	May 14, 2004	Jarnac	Glinos, T., D. H. Levy, Levy, W.	·	4.1 km	MPC · JPL
117033	2004 JP_{21}	—	May 9, 2004	Kitt Peak	Spacewatch	·	2.2 km	MPC · JPL
117034	2004 JH_{23}	—	May 13, 2004	Kitt Peak	Spacewatch	·	3.7 km	MPC · JPL
117035	2004 JR_{23}	—	May 13, 2004	Palomar	NEAT	·	3.6 km	MPC · JPL
117036	2004 JK_{24}	—	May 15, 2004	Socorro	LINEAR	·	4.4 km	MPC · JPL
117037	2004 JO_{24}	—	May 15, 2004	Socorro	LINEAR	·	3.7 km	MPC · JPL
117038	2004 JS_{24}	—	May 15, 2004	Socorro	LINEAR	V	1.2 km	MPC · JPL
117039	2004 JW_{24}	—	May 15, 2004	Socorro	LINEAR	·	3.8 km	MPC · JPL
117040	2004 JV_{25}	—	May 15, 2004	Socorro	LINEAR	·	2.2 km	MPC · JPL
117041	2004 JX_{25}	—	May 15, 2004	Socorro	LINEAR	·	4.2 km	MPC · JPL
117042	2004 JF_{26}	—	May 15, 2004	Socorro	LINEAR	(5)	2.4 km	MPC · JPL
117043	2004 JL_{26}	—	May 15, 2004	Socorro	LINEAR	·	3.9 km	MPC · JPL
117044	2004 JX_{27}	—	May 15, 2004	Siding Spring	SSS	·	5.1 km	MPC · JPL
117045	2004 JD_{30}	—	May 15, 2004	Socorro	LINEAR	KOR	2.8 km	MPC · JPL
117046	2004 JL_{31}	—	May 15, 2004	Socorro	LINEAR	EOS	4.9 km	MPC · JPL
117047	2004 JU_{31}	—	May 14, 2004	Socorro	LINEAR	·	3.7 km	MPC · JPL
117048	2004 JT_{32}	—	May 15, 2004	Socorro	LINEAR	NEM	4.1 km	MPC · JPL
117049	2004 JM_{33}	—	May 15, 2004	Socorro	LINEAR	HYG	5.2 km	MPC · JPL
117050	2004 JR_{34}	—	May 15, 2004	Socorro	LINEAR	·	5.2 km	MPC · JPL
117051	2004 JT_{37}	—	May 14, 2004	Socorro	LINEAR	·	6.5 km	MPC · JPL
117052	2004 JA_{42}	—	May 15, 2004	Socorro	LINEAR	·	4.0 km	MPC · JPL
117053	2004 JJ_{43}	—	May 15, 2004	Socorro	LINEAR	·	5.8 km	MPC · JPL
117054	2004 JD_{44}	—	May 12, 2004	Anderson Mesa	LONEOS	·	3.1 km	MPC · JPL
117055	2004 JT_{44}	—	May 15, 2004	Socorro	LINEAR	·	5.5 km	MPC · JPL
117056	2004 JJ_{46}	—	May 13, 2004	Kitt Peak	Spacewatch	·	2.2 km	MPC · JPL
117057	2004 KN	—	May 16, 2004	Socorro	LINEAR	PHO	5.0 km	MPC · JPL
117058	2004 KW	—	May 17, 2004	Reedy Creek	J. Broughton	HNS	3.3 km	MPC · JPL
117059	2004 KP_{1}	—	May 18, 2004	Nashville	Clingan, R.	·	5.4 km	MPC · JPL
117060	2004 KD_{3}	—	May 16, 2004	Socorro	LINEAR	·	7.0 km	MPC · JPL
117061	2004 KS_{3}	—	May 16, 2004	Socorro	LINEAR	·	5.5 km	MPC · JPL
117062	2004 KT_{3}	—	May 16, 2004	Socorro	LINEAR	·	3.4 km	MPC · JPL
117063	2004 KS_{4}	—	May 18, 2004	Socorro	LINEAR	HYG	5.3 km	MPC · JPL
117064	2004 KM_{5}	—	May 16, 2004	Socorro	LINEAR	V	1.3 km	MPC · JPL
117065	2004 KD_{9}	—	May 18, 2004	Socorro	LINEAR	·	5.3 km	MPC · JPL
117066	2004 KR_{9}	—	May 19, 2004	Socorro	LINEAR	HYG	6.1 km	MPC · JPL
117067	2004 KS_{10}	—	May 17, 2004	Socorro	LINEAR	·	3.5 km	MPC · JPL
117068	2004 KP_{12}	—	May 22, 2004	Catalina	CSS	·	2.7 km	MPC · JPL
117069	2004 KV_{12}	—	May 17, 2004	Bergisch Gladbach	W. Bickel	·	3.2 km	MPC · JPL
117070	2004 KE_{13}	—	May 18, 2004	Socorro	LINEAR	EUN	1.8 km	MPC · JPL
117071	2004 KO_{13}	—	May 19, 2004	Campo Imperatore	CINEOS	·	3.1 km	MPC · JPL
117072	2004 KU_{13}	—	May 22, 2004	Catalina	CSS	·	2.4 km	MPC · JPL
117073	2004 KP_{14}	—	May 23, 2004	Kitt Peak	Spacewatch	·	5.2 km	MPC · JPL
117074	2004 KS_{14}	—	May 23, 2004	Socorro	LINEAR	·	5.2 km	MPC · JPL
117075	2004 KP_{15}	—	May 24, 2004	Socorro	LINEAR	·	5.8 km	MPC · JPL
117076	2004 KM_{17}	—	May 19, 2004	Socorro	LINEAR	THM	3.7 km	MPC · JPL
117077	2004 LU_{2}	—	June 5, 2004	Palomar	NEAT	·	3.5 km	MPC · JPL
117078	2004 LC_{3}	—	June 6, 2004	Palomar	NEAT	·	3.4 km	MPC · JPL
117079	2004 LO_{3}	—	June 11, 2004	Anderson Mesa	LONEOS	MAR	2.6 km	MPC · JPL
117080	2004 LE_{9}	—	June 13, 2004	Kitt Peak	Spacewatch	EUN	2.5 km	MPC · JPL
117081	2004 LB_{11}	—	June 10, 2004	Campo Imperatore	CINEOS	·	5.9 km	MPC · JPL
117082	2004 LK_{11}	—	June 11, 2004	Catalina	CSS	·	2.5 km	MPC · JPL
117083	2004 LN_{16}	—	June 12, 2004	Catalina	CSS	CLO	4.1 km	MPC · JPL
117084	2004 LD_{17}	—	June 14, 2004	Socorro	LINEAR	PHO	2.1 km	MPC · JPL
117085	2004 LS_{17}	—	June 14, 2004	Socorro	LINEAR	·	3.6 km	MPC · JPL
117086 Lóczy	2004 LZ_{23}	Lóczy	June 8, 2004	Piszkéstető	K. Sárneczky, Szabo, G.	·	6.1 km	MPC · JPL
117087	2004 LP_{27}	—	June 13, 2004	Kitt Peak	Spacewatch	·	2.9 km	MPC · JPL
117088	2004 LG_{30}	—	June 13, 2004	Socorro	LINEAR	·	3.2 km	MPC · JPL
117089	2004 LK_{31}	—	June 12, 2004	Catalina	CSS	JUN	1.9 km	MPC · JPL
117090	2004 MF_{4}	—	June 16, 2004	Socorro	LINEAR	(5)	2.4 km	MPC · JPL
117091	2004 NU_{6}	—	July 11, 2004	Socorro	LINEAR	·	4.9 km	MPC · JPL
117092	2004 NB_{7}	—	July 11, 2004	Socorro	LINEAR	V	2.0 km	MPC · JPL
117093 Umbria	2004 NE_{9}	Umbria	July 12, 2004	Vallemare di Borbona	V. S. Casulli	·	2.4 km	MPC · JPL
117094	2004 NN_{15}	—	July 11, 2004	Socorro	LINEAR	·	5.6 km	MPC · JPL
117095	2004 NS_{17}	—	July 12, 2004	Palomar	NEAT	·	3.3 km	MPC · JPL
117096	2004 NA_{22}	—	July 15, 2004	Socorro	LINEAR	·	2.9 km	MPC · JPL
117097	2004 NJ_{22}	—	July 11, 2004	Socorro	LINEAR	HYG	5.7 km	MPC · JPL
117098	2004 NF_{25}	—	July 15, 2004	Socorro	LINEAR	·	7.2 km	MPC · JPL
117099	2004 NB_{27}	—	July 11, 2004	Socorro	LINEAR	·	6.6 km	MPC · JPL
117100	2004 NL_{30}	—	July 14, 2004	Siding Spring	SSS	PHO	2.5 km	MPC · JPL

== 117101–117200 ==
back to top

Designation			Discovery			Properties		Ref
Permanent	Provisional	Named after	Date	Site	Discoverer(s)	Category	Diam.	Ref
117101	2004 OC_{1}	—	July 16, 2004	Socorro	LINEAR	·	2.5 km	MPC · JPL
117102	2004 OF_{3}	—	July 16, 2004	Socorro	LINEAR	3:2	12 km	MPC · JPL
117103	2004 OT_{3}	—	July 16, 2004	Socorro	LINEAR	KOR	2.9 km	MPC · JPL
117104	2004 OB_{4}	—	July 17, 2004	Socorro	LINEAR	·	1.5 km	MPC · JPL
117105	2004 OF_{5}	—	July 16, 2004	Socorro	LINEAR	·	2.3 km	MPC · JPL
117106	2004 OT_{6}	—	July 16, 2004	Socorro	LINEAR	3:2	5.9 km	MPC · JPL
117107	2004 OL_{10}	—	July 21, 2004	Reedy Creek	J. Broughton	·	3.3 km	MPC · JPL
117108	2004 PU_{1}	—	August 6, 2004	Reedy Creek	J. Broughton	3:2	9.1 km	MPC · JPL
117109	2004 PA_{4}	—	August 3, 2004	Siding Spring	SSS	MAS	1.5 km	MPC · JPL
117110	2004 PE_{5}	—	August 6, 2004	Palomar	NEAT	·	2.9 km	MPC · JPL
117111	2004 PR_{5}	—	August 6, 2004	Palomar	NEAT	EOS	3.5 km	MPC · JPL
117112	2004 PH_{9}	—	August 6, 2004	Palomar	NEAT	·	5.9 km	MPC · JPL
117113	2004 PG_{11}	—	August 7, 2004	Palomar	NEAT	HIL · 3:2	9.9 km	MPC · JPL
117114	2004 PU_{12}	—	August 7, 2004	Palomar	NEAT	MAS	1.4 km	MPC · JPL
117115	2004 PV_{12}	—	August 7, 2004	Palomar	NEAT	·	4.0 km	MPC · JPL
117116	2004 PV_{14}	—	August 7, 2004	Palomar	NEAT	·	2.9 km	MPC · JPL
117117	2004 PJ_{16}	—	August 7, 2004	Palomar	NEAT	·	1.8 km	MPC · JPL
117118	2004 PZ_{18}	—	August 8, 2004	Anderson Mesa	LONEOS	·	4.5 km	MPC · JPL
117119	2004 PE_{21}	—	August 7, 2004	Palomar	NEAT	·	3.2 km	MPC · JPL
117120	2004 PF_{21}	—	August 7, 2004	Palomar	NEAT	·	2.9 km	MPC · JPL
117121	2004 PY_{24}	—	August 8, 2004	Socorro	LINEAR	·	6.0 km	MPC · JPL
117122	2004 PZ_{34}	—	August 8, 2004	Anderson Mesa	LONEOS	·	3.1 km	MPC · JPL
117123	2004 PZ_{35}	—	August 8, 2004	Campo Imperatore	CINEOS	·	3.3 km	MPC · JPL
117124	2004 PA_{38}	—	August 9, 2004	Socorro	LINEAR	NYS	2.5 km	MPC · JPL
117125	2004 PF_{38}	—	August 9, 2004	Socorro	LINEAR	·	2.2 km	MPC · JPL
117126	2004 PN_{39}	—	August 9, 2004	Anderson Mesa	LONEOS	·	2.6 km	MPC · JPL
117127	2004 PQ_{40}	—	August 9, 2004	Socorro	LINEAR	·	3.1 km	MPC · JPL
117128	2004 PL_{47}	—	August 8, 2004	Socorro	LINEAR	·	3.4 km	MPC · JPL
117129	2004 PL_{51}	—	August 8, 2004	Socorro	LINEAR	·	6.1 km	MPC · JPL
117130	2004 PV_{58}	—	August 9, 2004	Socorro	LINEAR	NYS	2.2 km	MPC · JPL
117131	2004 PW_{60}	—	August 9, 2004	Socorro	LINEAR	T_{j} (2.98) · HIL · 3:2	10 km	MPC · JPL
117132	2004 PF_{61}	—	August 9, 2004	Socorro	LINEAR	MRX	1.9 km	MPC · JPL
117133	2004 PT_{64}	—	August 10, 2004	Socorro	LINEAR	·	2.0 km	MPC · JPL
117134	2004 PY_{69}	—	August 7, 2004	Palomar	NEAT	V	1.5 km	MPC · JPL
117135	2004 PQ_{78}	—	August 9, 2004	Anderson Mesa	LONEOS	·	8.4 km	MPC · JPL
117136	2004 PO_{80}	—	August 9, 2004	Socorro	LINEAR	·	7.6 km	MPC · JPL
117137	2004 PF_{81}	—	August 10, 2004	Socorro	LINEAR	·	3.5 km	MPC · JPL
117138	2004 PS_{85}	—	August 10, 2004	Socorro	LINEAR	NYS	2.2 km	MPC · JPL
117139	2004 PV_{85}	—	August 10, 2004	Socorro	LINEAR	·	2.3 km	MPC · JPL
117140	2004 PX_{88}	—	August 8, 2004	Anderson Mesa	LONEOS	·	2.5 km	MPC · JPL
117141	2004 PA_{89}	—	August 8, 2004	Anderson Mesa	LONEOS	slow	1.3 km	MPC · JPL
117142	2004 PK_{89}	—	August 9, 2004	Socorro	LINEAR	·	5.0 km	MPC · JPL
117143	2004 PE_{90}	—	August 10, 2004	Socorro	LINEAR	·	2.6 km	MPC · JPL
117144	2004 PF_{90}	—	August 10, 2004	Socorro	LINEAR	·	2.2 km	MPC · JPL
117145	2004 PA_{91}	—	August 10, 2004	Socorro	LINEAR	·	1.9 km	MPC · JPL
117146	2004 PB_{91}	—	August 10, 2004	Socorro	LINEAR	·	5.9 km	MPC · JPL
117147	2004 PZ_{97}	—	August 14, 2004	Reedy Creek	J. Broughton	·	5.3 km	MPC · JPL
117148	2004 PJ_{99}	—	August 10, 2004	Socorro	LINEAR	V	1.3 km	MPC · JPL
117149	2004 PW_{103}	—	August 12, 2004	Socorro	LINEAR	·	5.7 km	MPC · JPL
117150	2004 PC_{104}	—	August 12, 2004	Socorro	LINEAR	·	4.1 km	MPC · JPL
117151	2004 PL_{105}	—	August 12, 2004	Siding Spring	SSS	EOS	4.3 km	MPC · JPL
117152	2004 QO_{1}	—	August 16, 2004	Siding Spring	SSS	·	9.9 km	MPC · JPL
117153	2004 QC_{4}	—	August 19, 2004	Siding Spring	SSS	·	2.2 km	MPC · JPL
117154	2004 QG_{4}	—	August 19, 2004	Siding Spring	SSS	·	7.5 km	MPC · JPL
117155	2004 QT_{5}	—	August 17, 2004	Socorro	LINEAR	·	2.8 km	MPC · JPL
117156 Altschwendt	2004 QV_{7}	Altschwendt	August 23, 2004	Altschwendt	W. Ries	·	2.2 km	MPC · JPL
117157	2004 QR_{9}	—	August 21, 2004	Siding Spring	SSS	V	1.5 km	MPC · JPL
117158	2004 QB_{11}	—	August 21, 2004	Siding Spring	SSS	·	2.7 km	MPC · JPL
117159	2004 QE_{12}	—	August 21, 2004	Siding Spring	SSS	·	4.8 km	MPC · JPL
117160	2004 QR_{17}	—	August 19, 2004	Socorro	LINEAR	ADE	5.3 km	MPC · JPL
117161	2004 QT_{17}	—	August 19, 2004	Socorro	LINEAR	·	3.4 km	MPC · JPL
117162	2004 QU_{19}	—	August 21, 2004	Goodricke-Pigott	Goodricke-Pigott	·	8.4 km	MPC · JPL
117163	2004 QA_{20}	—	August 22, 2004	Goodricke-Pigott	Goodricke-Pigott	(1547)	3.4 km	MPC · JPL
117164	2004 RB_{3}	—	September 6, 2004	Socorro	LINEAR	·	7.7 km	MPC · JPL
117165	2004 RZ_{4}	—	September 4, 2004	Palomar	NEAT	·	4.0 km	MPC · JPL
117166	2004 RU_{6}	—	September 5, 2004	Palomar	NEAT	·	6.8 km	MPC · JPL
117167	2004 RL_{12}	—	September 8, 2004	Socorro	LINEAR	·	3.1 km	MPC · JPL
117168	2004 RX_{15}	—	September 7, 2004	Socorro	LINEAR	AEO	2.9 km	MPC · JPL
117169	2004 RZ_{33}	—	September 7, 2004	Socorro	LINEAR	EOS	3.2 km	MPC · JPL
117170	2004 RK_{36}	—	September 7, 2004	Socorro	LINEAR	·	3.0 km	MPC · JPL
117171	2004 RD_{48}	—	September 8, 2004	Socorro	LINEAR	·	3.1 km	MPC · JPL
117172	2004 RR_{50}	—	September 8, 2004	Socorro	LINEAR	·	1.5 km	MPC · JPL
117173	2004 RK_{51}	—	September 8, 2004	Socorro	LINEAR	AGN	2.7 km	MPC · JPL
117174	2004 RC_{59}	—	September 8, 2004	Socorro	LINEAR	·	8.6 km	MPC · JPL
117175	2004 RF_{59}	—	September 8, 2004	Socorro	LINEAR	AGN	2.8 km	MPC · JPL
117176	2004 RN_{59}	—	September 8, 2004	Socorro	LINEAR	·	5.1 km	MPC · JPL
117177	2004 RR_{61}	—	September 8, 2004	Socorro	LINEAR	·	2.4 km	MPC · JPL
117178	2004 RC_{65}	—	September 8, 2004	Socorro	LINEAR	·	3.9 km	MPC · JPL
117179	2004 RH_{77}	—	September 8, 2004	Socorro	LINEAR	·	1.8 km	MPC · JPL
117180	2004 RH_{78}	—	September 8, 2004	Socorro	LINEAR	·	3.4 km	MPC · JPL
117181	2004 RP_{78}	—	September 8, 2004	Socorro	LINEAR	·	5.2 km	MPC · JPL
117182	2004 RV_{78}	—	September 8, 2004	Palomar	NEAT	NYS	1.9 km	MPC · JPL
117183	2004 RY_{78}	—	September 8, 2004	Palomar	NEAT	·	4.1 km	MPC · JPL
117184	2004 RG_{79}	—	September 8, 2004	Palomar	NEAT	·	4.4 km	MPC · JPL
117185	2004 RS_{90}	—	September 8, 2004	Socorro	LINEAR	·	2.6 km	MPC · JPL
117186	2004 RS_{94}	—	September 8, 2004	Socorro	LINEAR	·	2.2 km	MPC · JPL
117187	2004 RH_{99}	—	September 8, 2004	Socorro	LINEAR	NYS	1.8 km	MPC · JPL
117188	2004 RN_{136}	—	September 7, 2004	Palomar	NEAT	·	8.7 km	MPC · JPL
117189	2004 RB_{137}	—	September 8, 2004	Socorro	LINEAR	·	6.4 km	MPC · JPL
117190	2004 RQ_{138}	—	September 8, 2004	Palomar	NEAT	·	3.3 km	MPC · JPL
117191	2004 RY_{139}	—	September 8, 2004	Socorro	LINEAR	·	7.2 km	MPC · JPL
117192	2004 RE_{140}	—	September 8, 2004	Socorro	LINEAR	·	5.1 km	MPC · JPL
117193	2004 RY_{151}	—	September 9, 2004	Socorro	LINEAR	·	3.0 km	MPC · JPL
117194	2004 RJ_{153}	—	September 10, 2004	Socorro	LINEAR	V	1.2 km	MPC · JPL
117195	2004 RL_{154}	—	September 10, 2004	Socorro	LINEAR	·	1.1 km	MPC · JPL
117196	2004 RW_{165}	—	September 11, 2004	Socorro	LINEAR	·	6.2 km	MPC · JPL
117197	2004 RR_{171}	—	September 9, 2004	Socorro	LINEAR	V	1.4 km	MPC · JPL
117198	2004 RL_{173}	—	September 9, 2004	Socorro	LINEAR	·	2.5 km	MPC · JPL
117199	2004 RM_{173}	—	September 9, 2004	Socorro	LINEAR	·	1.5 km	MPC · JPL
117200	2004 RF_{176}	—	September 10, 2004	Socorro	LINEAR	T_{j} (2.99) · 3:2	10 km	MPC · JPL

== 117201–117300 ==
back to top

Designation			Discovery			Properties		Ref
Permanent	Provisional	Named after	Date	Site	Discoverer(s)	Category	Diam.	Ref
117201	2004 RB_{183}	—	September 10, 2004	Socorro	LINEAR	·	2.6 km	MPC · JPL
117202	2004 RY_{187}	—	September 10, 2004	Socorro	LINEAR	V	1.5 km	MPC · JPL
117203	2004 RH_{188}	—	September 10, 2004	Socorro	LINEAR	·	4.4 km	MPC · JPL
117204	2004 RD_{192}	—	September 10, 2004	Socorro	LINEAR	·	7.1 km	MPC · JPL
117205	2004 RO_{192}	—	September 10, 2004	Socorro	LINEAR	EOS	4.9 km	MPC · JPL
117206	2004 RC_{193}	—	September 10, 2004	Socorro	LINEAR	EUN	2.0 km	MPC · JPL
117207	2004 RH_{193}	—	September 10, 2004	Socorro	LINEAR	EOS	4.3 km	MPC · JPL
117208	2004 RM_{194}	—	September 10, 2004	Socorro	LINEAR	·	7.4 km	MPC · JPL
117209	2004 RH_{200}	—	September 10, 2004	Socorro	LINEAR	·	3.2 km	MPC · JPL
117210	2004 RM_{200}	—	September 10, 2004	Socorro	LINEAR	·	7.2 km	MPC · JPL
117211	2004 RO_{205}	—	September 8, 2004	Socorro	LINEAR	·	4.2 km	MPC · JPL
117212	2004 RE_{214}	—	September 11, 2004	Socorro	LINEAR	·	3.8 km	MPC · JPL
117213	2004 RK_{214}	—	September 11, 2004	Socorro	LINEAR	THB	4.5 km	MPC · JPL
117214	2004 RW_{216}	—	September 11, 2004	Socorro	LINEAR	·	4.1 km	MPC · JPL
117215	2004 RO_{224}	—	September 8, 2004	Palomar	NEAT	·	3.7 km	MPC · JPL
117216	2004 RM_{236}	—	September 10, 2004	Socorro	LINEAR	·	3.5 km	MPC · JPL
117217	2004 RA_{254}	—	September 6, 2004	Palomar	NEAT	·	3.0 km	MPC · JPL
117218	2004 RF_{255}	—	September 6, 2004	Palomar	NEAT	EOS	4.6 km	MPC · JPL
117219	2004 RF_{266}	—	September 10, 2004	Socorro	LINEAR	·	9.2 km	MPC · JPL
117220	2004 RV_{306}	—	September 12, 2004	Socorro	LINEAR	·	5.1 km	MPC · JPL
117221	2004 RL_{307}	—	September 13, 2004	Socorro	LINEAR	·	2.6 km	MPC · JPL
117222	2004 RD_{308}	—	September 13, 2004	Socorro	LINEAR	MRX	2.0 km	MPC · JPL
117223	2004 RP_{311}	—	September 14, 2004	Palomar	NEAT	·	2.5 km	MPC · JPL
117224	2004 RP_{322}	—	September 13, 2004	Socorro	LINEAR	LUT	10 km	MPC · JPL
117225	2004 RW_{325}	—	September 13, 2004	Socorro	LINEAR	H	1.2 km	MPC · JPL
117226	2004 RZ_{325}	—	September 13, 2004	Socorro	LINEAR	PHO	2.8 km	MPC · JPL
117227	2004 RG_{326}	—	September 13, 2004	Socorro	LINEAR	·	6.8 km	MPC · JPL
117228	2004 RN_{328}	—	September 15, 2004	Anderson Mesa	LONEOS	·	1.8 km	MPC · JPL
117229	2004 RP_{329}	—	September 15, 2004	Kitt Peak	Spacewatch	·	5.8 km	MPC · JPL
117230	2004 RC_{338}	—	September 15, 2004	Kitt Peak	Spacewatch	·	1.6 km	MPC · JPL
117231	2004 RY_{341}	—	September 9, 2004	Socorro	LINEAR	·	1.1 km	MPC · JPL
117232	2004 SN_{2}	—	September 16, 2004	Kitt Peak	Spacewatch	·	4.0 km	MPC · JPL
117233	2004 SG_{9}	—	September 16, 2004	Socorro	LINEAR	BRU	6.9 km	MPC · JPL
117234	2004 SO_{11}	—	September 16, 2004	Siding Spring	SSS	·	2.3 km	MPC · JPL
117235	2004 SM_{12}	—	September 17, 2004	Socorro	LINEAR	·	8.6 km	MPC · JPL
117236	2004 SU_{14}	—	September 17, 2004	Anderson Mesa	LONEOS	V	1.4 km	MPC · JPL
117237	2004 SY_{14}	—	September 17, 2004	Anderson Mesa	LONEOS	·	2.4 km	MPC · JPL
117238	2004 SQ_{17}	—	September 17, 2004	Anderson Mesa	LONEOS	·	2.8 km	MPC · JPL
117239	2004 SM_{18}	—	September 17, 2004	Kitt Peak	Spacewatch	HYG	6.0 km	MPC · JPL
117240 Zhytomyr	2004 SX_{19}	Zhytomyr	September 19, 2004	Andrushivka	Andrushivka	·	3.9 km	MPC · JPL
117241	2004 SS_{20}	—	September 17, 2004	Desert Eagle	W. K. Y. Yeung	MAS	1.2 km	MPC · JPL
117242	2004 SF_{21}	—	September 21, 2004	Socorro	LINEAR	(23255)	5.9 km	MPC · JPL
117243	2004 SU_{25}	—	September 22, 2004	Desert Eagle	W. K. Y. Yeung	SYL · CYB	9.1 km	MPC · JPL
117244	2004 SG_{29}	—	September 17, 2004	Socorro	LINEAR	·	1.5 km	MPC · JPL
117245	2004 SC_{32}	—	September 17, 2004	Socorro	LINEAR	·	3.5 km	MPC · JPL
117246	2004 SN_{33}	—	September 17, 2004	Socorro	LINEAR	·	1.9 km	MPC · JPL
117247	2004 SO_{33}	—	September 17, 2004	Socorro	LINEAR	V	1.2 km	MPC · JPL
117248	2004 SN_{38}	—	September 17, 2004	Socorro	LINEAR	EUN	2.5 km	MPC · JPL
117249	2004 SW_{38}	—	September 17, 2004	Socorro	LINEAR	EOS	3.6 km	MPC · JPL
117250	2004 ST_{39}	—	September 17, 2004	Socorro	LINEAR	H	920 m	MPC · JPL
117251	2004 SD_{41}	—	September 17, 2004	Kitt Peak	Spacewatch	·	3.7 km	MPC · JPL
117252	2004 SJ_{41}	—	September 17, 2004	Kitt Peak	Spacewatch	·	3.2 km	MPC · JPL
117253	2004 ST_{45}	—	September 18, 2004	Socorro	LINEAR	·	4.4 km	MPC · JPL
117254	2004 SV_{45}	—	September 18, 2004	Socorro	LINEAR	·	5.5 km	MPC · JPL
117255	2004 SJ_{46}	—	September 18, 2004	Socorro	LINEAR	·	3.3 km	MPC · JPL
117256	2004 SQ_{50}	—	September 22, 2004	Socorro	LINEAR	EOS	3.9 km	MPC · JPL
117257	2004 SV_{53}	—	September 22, 2004	Socorro	LINEAR	·	6.6 km	MPC · JPL
117258	2004 SL_{54}	—	September 22, 2004	Socorro	LINEAR	·	3.5 km	MPC · JPL
117259	2004 SW_{54}	—	September 22, 2004	Socorro	LINEAR	EUN	3.2 km	MPC · JPL
117260	2004 SD_{55}	—	September 22, 2004	Socorro	LINEAR	·	2.9 km	MPC · JPL
117261	2004 SS_{57}	—	September 16, 2004	Anderson Mesa	LONEOS	·	5.8 km	MPC · JPL
117262	2004 ST_{57}	—	September 16, 2004	Anderson Mesa	LONEOS	·	2.0 km	MPC · JPL
117263	2004 SB_{58}	—	September 16, 2004	Anderson Mesa	LONEOS	slow	2.0 km	MPC · JPL
117264	2004 SJ_{59}	—	September 22, 2004	Socorro	LINEAR	·	2.4 km	MPC · JPL
117265	2004 TH_{1}	—	October 4, 2004	Goodricke-Pigott	R. A. Tucker	THM	5.9 km	MPC · JPL
117266	2004 TO_{7}	—	October 5, 2004	Socorro	LINEAR	·	4.3 km	MPC · JPL
117267	2004 TA_{16}	—	October 6, 2004	Socorro	LINEAR	T_{j} (2.94)	8.8 km	MPC · JPL
117268	2004 TK_{52}	—	October 4, 2004	Kitt Peak	Spacewatch	·	8.1 km	MPC · JPL
117269	2004 TX_{53}	—	October 4, 2004	Kitt Peak	Spacewatch	·	3.7 km	MPC · JPL
117270	2004 TT_{100}	—	October 6, 2004	Socorro	LINEAR	THB	7.1 km	MPC · JPL
117271	2004 TY_{102}	—	October 6, 2004	Palomar	NEAT	·	5.6 km	MPC · JPL
117272	2004 TJ_{109}	—	October 7, 2004	Socorro	LINEAR	·	4.8 km	MPC · JPL
117273	2004 TX_{109}	—	October 7, 2004	Socorro	LINEAR	(1118)	5.7 km	MPC · JPL
117274	2004 TR_{110}	—	October 7, 2004	Anderson Mesa	LONEOS	MRX	2.1 km	MPC · JPL
117275	2004 TC_{113}	—	October 7, 2004	Palomar	NEAT	GEF	2.6 km	MPC · JPL
117276	2004 TQ_{118}	—	October 5, 2004	Palomar	NEAT	NYS	1.8 km	MPC · JPL
117277	2004 TX_{118}	—	October 6, 2004	Socorro	LINEAR	V	1.2 km	MPC · JPL
117278	2004 TQ_{120}	—	October 6, 2004	Siding Spring	SSS	·	5.4 km	MPC · JPL
117279	2004 TM_{121}	—	October 7, 2004	Anderson Mesa	LONEOS	·	1.5 km	MPC · JPL
117280	2004 TW_{121}	—	October 7, 2004	Anderson Mesa	LONEOS	·	2.7 km	MPC · JPL
117281	2004 TX_{130}	—	October 7, 2004	Anderson Mesa	LONEOS	·	4.2 km	MPC · JPL
117282	2004 TT_{139}	—	October 9, 2004	Anderson Mesa	LONEOS	·	4.2 km	MPC · JPL
117283	2004 TQ_{168}	—	October 7, 2004	Socorro	LINEAR	·	5.0 km	MPC · JPL
117284	2004 TA_{170}	—	October 7, 2004	Socorro	LINEAR	·	2.9 km	MPC · JPL
117285	2004 TK_{173}	—	October 8, 2004	Socorro	LINEAR	·	4.8 km	MPC · JPL
117286	2004 TJ_{208}	—	October 7, 2004	Kitt Peak	Spacewatch	·	4.0 km	MPC · JPL
117287	2004 TS_{221}	—	October 7, 2004	Socorro	LINEAR	·	3.7 km	MPC · JPL
117288	2004 TU_{221}	—	October 7, 2004	Socorro	LINEAR	T_{j} (2.99) · HIL · 3:2 · (6124)	15 km	MPC · JPL
117289	2004 TV_{240}	—	October 10, 2004	Socorro	LINEAR	·	4.6 km	MPC · JPL
117290	2004 TW_{247}	—	October 7, 2004	Socorro	LINEAR	·	3.0 km	MPC · JPL
117291	2004 TK_{287}	—	October 9, 2004	Kitt Peak	Spacewatch	·	3.1 km	MPC · JPL
117292	2004 TP_{287}	—	October 9, 2004	Socorro	LINEAR	·	3.0 km	MPC · JPL
117293	2004 TC_{328}	—	October 4, 2004	Palomar	NEAT	·	2.9 km	MPC · JPL
117294	2004 TY_{338}	—	October 12, 2004	Anderson Mesa	LONEOS	·	4.5 km	MPC · JPL
117295	2004 TD_{355}	—	October 7, 2004	Socorro	LINEAR	·	3.5 km	MPC · JPL
117296	2004 UP_{7}	—	October 21, 2004	Socorro	LINEAR	·	3.3 km	MPC · JPL
117297	2004 UH_{8}	—	October 21, 2004	Socorro	LINEAR	·	5.5 km	MPC · JPL
117298	2004 UX_{9}	—	October 20, 2004	Socorro	LINEAR	·	1.5 km	MPC · JPL
117299	2004 UC_{10}	—	October 19, 2004	Socorro	LINEAR	·	1.6 km	MPC · JPL
117300	2004 VG_{2}	—	November 2, 2004	Anderson Mesa	LONEOS	·	6.3 km	MPC · JPL

== 117301–117400 ==
back to top

Designation			Discovery			Properties		Ref
Permanent	Provisional	Named after	Date	Site	Discoverer(s)	Category	Diam.	Ref
117301	2004 VX_{4}	—	November 3, 2004	Anderson Mesa	LONEOS	·	1.4 km	MPC · JPL
117302	2004 VP_{5}	—	November 3, 2004	Anderson Mesa	LONEOS	·	7.0 km	MPC · JPL
117303	2004 VB_{10}	—	November 3, 2004	Anderson Mesa	LONEOS	·	4.7 km	MPC · JPL
117304	2004 VR_{12}	—	November 3, 2004	Catalina	CSS	·	3.9 km	MPC · JPL
117305	2004 VU_{15}	—	November 1, 2004	Palomar	NEAT	EOS	3.2 km	MPC · JPL
117306	2004 VF_{21}	—	November 4, 2004	Catalina	CSS	·	1.4 km	MPC · JPL
117307	2004 VY_{21}	—	November 4, 2004	Catalina	CSS	·	8.0 km	MPC · JPL
117308	2004 VQ_{22}	—	November 4, 2004	Catalina	CSS	·	2.9 km	MPC · JPL
117309	2004 VT_{22}	—	November 4, 2004	Catalina	CSS	KOR	2.7 km	MPC · JPL
117310	2004 VA_{23}	—	November 5, 2004	Campo Imperatore	CINEOS	·	6.2 km	MPC · JPL
117311	2004 VD_{23}	—	November 5, 2004	Campo Imperatore	CINEOS	·	5.3 km	MPC · JPL
117312	2004 VO_{24}	—	November 3, 2004	Anderson Mesa	LONEOS	·	5.0 km	MPC · JPL
117313	2004 VR_{26}	—	November 4, 2004	Catalina	CSS	·	1.6 km	MPC · JPL
117314	2004 VD_{40}	—	November 4, 2004	Kitt Peak	Spacewatch	·	2.8 km	MPC · JPL
117315	2004 VO_{55}	—	November 4, 2004	Anderson Mesa	LONEOS	SYL · CYB	8.4 km	MPC · JPL
117316	2004 VM_{57}	—	November 5, 2004	Palomar	NEAT	·	5.2 km	MPC · JPL
117317	2004 VL_{59}	—	November 9, 2004	Catalina	CSS	·	3.3 km	MPC · JPL
117318	2004 VO_{62}	—	November 6, 2004	Socorro	LINEAR	·	2.6 km	MPC · JPL
117319	2004 VR_{64}	—	November 10, 2004	Kitt Peak	Spacewatch	·	6.4 km	MPC · JPL
117320	2004 VS_{64}	—	November 10, 2004	Kitt Peak	Spacewatch	·	3.6 km	MPC · JPL
117321	2004 VU_{64}	—	November 10, 2004	Kitt Peak	Spacewatch	·	5.0 km	MPC · JPL
117322	2004 VJ_{72}	—	November 4, 2004	Anderson Mesa	LONEOS	·	5.7 km	MPC · JPL
117323	2004 VE_{78}	—	November 12, 2004	Socorro	LINEAR	H	1.4 km	MPC · JPL
117324	2004 WW_{4}	—	November 18, 2004	Campo Imperatore	CINEOS	·	1.5 km	MPC · JPL
117325	2004 WU_{8}	—	November 18, 2004	Socorro	LINEAR	VER	5.9 km	MPC · JPL
117326	2004 WV_{8}	—	November 18, 2004	Socorro	LINEAR	(2076)	1.8 km	MPC · JPL
117327	2004 WD_{9}	—	November 19, 2004	Socorro	LINEAR	·	2.6 km	MPC · JPL
117328	2004 WH_{9}	—	November 21, 2004	Campo Imperatore	CINEOS	·	3.9 km	MPC · JPL
117329 Spencer	2004 XJ_{6}	Spencer	December 9, 2004	Jarnac	Jarnac	·	3.0 km	MPC · JPL
117330	2004 XF_{8}	—	December 2, 2004	Kitt Peak	Spacewatch	EOS	4.8 km	MPC · JPL
117331	2004 XF_{10}	—	December 2, 2004	Catalina	CSS	EUN	3.3 km	MPC · JPL
117332	2004 XX_{10}	—	December 3, 2004	Kitt Peak	Spacewatch	·	3.5 km	MPC · JPL
117333	2004 XF_{11}	—	December 3, 2004	Palomar	NEAT	·	4.1 km	MPC · JPL
117334	2004 XK_{11}	—	December 3, 2004	Kitt Peak	Spacewatch	·	3.7 km	MPC · JPL
117335	2004 XT_{11}	—	December 7, 2004	Socorro	LINEAR	BRG	4.3 km	MPC · JPL
117336	2004 XP_{15}	—	December 9, 2004	Socorro	LINEAR	·	2.9 km	MPC · JPL
117337	2004 XD_{17}	—	December 3, 2004	Kitt Peak	Spacewatch	·	2.3 km	MPC · JPL
117338	2004 XF_{18}	—	December 8, 2004	Socorro	LINEAR	HYG	5.0 km	MPC · JPL
117339	2004 XO_{20}	—	December 8, 2004	Socorro	LINEAR	·	9.0 km	MPC · JPL
117340	2004 XM_{23}	—	December 8, 2004	Socorro	LINEAR	PHO	3.2 km	MPC · JPL
117341	2004 XU_{26}	—	December 10, 2004	Socorro	LINEAR	KOR	2.9 km	MPC · JPL
117342	2004 XJ_{38}	—	December 7, 2004	Socorro	LINEAR	·	3.2 km	MPC · JPL
117343	2004 XR_{38}	—	December 7, 2004	Socorro	LINEAR	MAR	1.7 km	MPC · JPL
117344	2004 XY_{40}	—	December 11, 2004	Socorro	LINEAR	EOS	5.0 km	MPC · JPL
117345	2004 XO_{41}	—	December 11, 2004	Campo Imperatore	CINEOS	·	4.2 km	MPC · JPL
117346	2004 XB_{48}	—	December 9, 2004	Kitt Peak	Spacewatch	·	4.9 km	MPC · JPL
117347	2004 XF_{48}	—	December 10, 2004	Anderson Mesa	LONEOS	·	4.1 km	MPC · JPL
117348	2004 XF_{49}	—	December 11, 2004	Kitt Peak	Spacewatch	·	11 km	MPC · JPL
117349	2004 XN_{61}	—	December 11, 2004	Socorro	LINEAR	·	7.6 km	MPC · JPL
117350 Saburo	2004 XL_{62}	Saburo	December 13, 2004	Yamagata	K. Itagaki	·	8.3 km	MPC · JPL
117351	2004 XE_{63}	—	December 9, 2004	Catalina	CSS	·	2.9 km	MPC · JPL
117352	2004 XQ_{69}	—	December 10, 2004	Socorro	LINEAR	·	2.9 km	MPC · JPL
117353	2004 XS_{73}	—	December 11, 2004	Catalina	CSS	·	6.7 km	MPC · JPL
117354	2004 XQ_{75}	—	December 9, 2004	Catalina	CSS	·	4.0 km	MPC · JPL
117355	2004 XT_{86}	—	December 14, 2004	Socorro	LINEAR	·	1.7 km	MPC · JPL
117356	2004 XB_{87}	—	December 9, 2004	Socorro	LINEAR	·	5.9 km	MPC · JPL
117357	2004 XG_{88}	—	December 10, 2004	Socorro	LINEAR	·	3.5 km	MPC · JPL
117358	2004 XJ_{95}	—	December 11, 2004	Kitt Peak	Spacewatch	NYS	1.9 km	MPC · JPL
117359	2004 XS_{102}	—	December 13, 2004	Anderson Mesa	LONEOS	·	4.5 km	MPC · JPL
117360	2004 XC_{103}	—	December 14, 2004	Anderson Mesa	LONEOS	CLO	4.0 km	MPC · JPL
117361	2004 XV_{103}	—	December 9, 2004	Catalina	CSS	·	2.9 km	MPC · JPL
117362	2004 XW_{103}	—	December 9, 2004	Catalina	CSS	·	2.3 km	MPC · JPL
117363	2004 XX_{104}	—	December 10, 2004	Anderson Mesa	LONEOS	MAR	2.5 km	MPC · JPL
117364	2004 XM_{105}	—	December 11, 2004	Socorro	LINEAR	·	3.8 km	MPC · JPL
117365	2004 XR_{106}	—	December 11, 2004	Socorro	LINEAR	(31811)	4.3 km	MPC · JPL
117366	2004 XK_{107}	—	December 11, 2004	Socorro	LINEAR	·	1.7 km	MPC · JPL
117367	2004 XO_{107}	—	December 11, 2004	Socorro	LINEAR	·	2.4 km	MPC · JPL
117368	2004 XY_{119}	—	December 12, 2004	Kitt Peak	Spacewatch	MAS	1.3 km	MPC · JPL
117369	2004 XL_{121}	—	December 14, 2004	Catalina	CSS	·	2.6 km	MPC · JPL
117370	2004 XC_{129}	—	December 14, 2004	Anderson Mesa	LONEOS	·	3.2 km	MPC · JPL
117371	2004 XK_{144}	—	December 12, 2004	Anderson Mesa	LONEOS	EUP	10 km	MPC · JPL
117372	2004 XH_{145}	—	December 13, 2004	Socorro	LINEAR	(5)	3.9 km	MPC · JPL
117373	2004 XL_{145}	—	December 13, 2004	Anderson Mesa	LONEOS	·	7.4 km	MPC · JPL
117374	2004 XQ_{147}	—	December 13, 2004	Campo Imperatore	CINEOS	·	2.0 km	MPC · JPL
117375	2004 XY_{148}	—	December 14, 2004	Socorro	LINEAR	·	6.0 km	MPC · JPL
117376	2004 XP_{157}	—	December 14, 2004	Socorro	LINEAR	·	4.6 km	MPC · JPL
117377	2004 XW_{158}	—	December 14, 2004	Kitt Peak	Spacewatch	EOS	5.0 km	MPC · JPL
117378	2004 XZ_{163}	—	December 3, 2004	Anderson Mesa	LONEOS	PAD	4.1 km	MPC · JPL
117379	2004 XW_{169}	—	December 9, 2004	Catalina	CSS	·	4.9 km	MPC · JPL
117380	2004 XT_{174}	—	December 11, 2004	Kitt Peak	Spacewatch	·	7.6 km	MPC · JPL
117381 Lindaweiland	2004 YU	Lindaweiland	December 18, 2004	Junk Bond	D. Healy	KOR	3.1 km	MPC · JPL
117382	2004 YE_{2}	—	December 16, 2004	Anderson Mesa	LONEOS	·	2.0 km	MPC · JPL
117383	2004 YD_{4}	—	December 16, 2004	Kitt Peak	Spacewatch	·	6.1 km	MPC · JPL
117384 Halharrison	2004 YD_{16}	Halharrison	December 18, 2004	Mount Lemmon	Mount Lemmon Survey	·	2.6 km	MPC · JPL
117385 Maughan	2004 YN_{20}	Maughan	December 18, 2004	Mount Lemmon	Mount Lemmon Survey	L5	22 km	MPC · JPL
117386 Thomasschlapkohl	2004 YV_{20}	Thomasschlapkohl	December 18, 2004	Mount Lemmon	Mount Lemmon Survey	·	3.4 km	MPC · JPL
117387 Javiercerna	2004 YP_{21}	Javiercerna	December 18, 2004	Mount Lemmon	Mount Lemmon Survey	·	4.3 km	MPC · JPL
117388 Jamiemoore	2004 YB_{23}	Jamiemoore	December 18, 2004	Mount Lemmon	Mount Lemmon Survey	NYS	1.8 km	MPC · JPL
117389	2004 YD_{23}	—	December 18, 2004	Mount Lemmon	Mount Lemmon Survey	L5	19 km	MPC · JPL
117390 Stephanegendron	2004 YK_{26}	Stephanegendron	December 19, 2004	Mount Lemmon	Mount Lemmon Survey	THM	4.5 km	MPC · JPL
117391	2004 YD_{31}	—	December 18, 2004	Socorro	LINEAR	·	2.9 km	MPC · JPL
117392	2004 YV_{31}	—	December 19, 2004	Kitt Peak	Spacewatch	·	4.7 km	MPC · JPL
117393	2004 YO_{32}	—	December 21, 2004	Catalina	CSS	·	2.2 km	MPC · JPL
117394	2004 YS_{33}	—	December 16, 2004	Anderson Mesa	LONEOS	·	8.7 km	MPC · JPL
117395	2004 YL_{35}	—	December 21, 2004	Catalina	CSS	L5	17 km	MPC · JPL
117396	2005 AJ_{1}	—	January 1, 2005	Catalina	CSS	·	4.7 km	MPC · JPL
117397	2005 AW_{1}	—	January 1, 2005	Catalina	CSS	NYS	2.1 km	MPC · JPL
117398	2005 AZ_{2}	—	January 6, 2005	Socorro	LINEAR	·	6.5 km	MPC · JPL
117399	2005 AO_{7}	—	January 6, 2005	Catalina	CSS	(2076)	1.2 km	MPC · JPL
117400	2005 AA_{8}	—	January 6, 2005	Catalina	CSS	·	1.6 km	MPC · JPL

== 117401–117500 ==
back to top

Designation			Discovery			Properties		Ref
Permanent	Provisional	Named after	Date	Site	Discoverer(s)	Category	Diam.	Ref
117401	2005 AL_{8}	—	January 6, 2005	Catalina	CSS	·	4.8 km	MPC · JPL
117402	2005 AM_{8}	—	January 6, 2005	Catalina	CSS	·	3.1 km	MPC · JPL
117403	2005 AO_{8}	—	January 6, 2005	Catalina	CSS	·	4.5 km	MPC · JPL
117404	2005 AC_{9}	—	January 7, 2005	Socorro	LINEAR	L5	23 km	MPC · JPL
117405	2005 AY_{9}	—	January 6, 2005	Catalina	CSS	·	2.3 km	MPC · JPL
117406 Blasgámez	2005 AF_{10}	Blasgámez	January 7, 2005	Pla D'Arguines	R. Ferrando	·	7.3 km	MPC · JPL
117407	2005 AD_{11}	—	January 1, 2005	Črni Vrh	Mikuž, H.	·	2.5 km	MPC · JPL
117408	2005 AL_{11}	—	January 1, 2005	Catalina	CSS	·	5.2 km	MPC · JPL
117409	2005 AO_{11}	—	January 1, 2005	Catalina	CSS	·	6.6 km	MPC · JPL
117410	2005 AY_{11}	—	January 6, 2005	Catalina	CSS	·	2.0 km	MPC · JPL
117411 Adellehelble	2005 AH_{12}	Adellehelble	January 6, 2005	Catalina	CSS	EOS	3.7 km	MPC · JPL
117412	2005 AJ_{12}	—	January 6, 2005	Catalina	CSS	·	4.0 km	MPC · JPL
117413 Ramonycajal	2005 AE_{13}	Ramonycajal	January 8, 2005	La Cañada	Lacruz, J.	NYS	2.3 km	MPC · JPL
117414	2005 AG_{14}	—	January 9, 2005	Catalina	CSS	·	2.4 km	MPC · JPL
117415	2005 AY_{14}	—	January 6, 2005	Socorro	LINEAR	·	1.6 km	MPC · JPL
117416	2005 AC_{15}	—	January 6, 2005	Catalina	CSS	·	2.8 km	MPC · JPL
117417	2005 AS_{15}	—	January 6, 2005	Socorro	LINEAR	·	2.4 km	MPC · JPL
117418	2005 AE_{16}	—	January 6, 2005	Socorro	LINEAR	·	5.4 km	MPC · JPL
117419	2005 AD_{17}	—	January 6, 2005	Socorro	LINEAR	·	7.0 km	MPC · JPL
117420	2005 AM_{17}	—	January 6, 2005	Socorro	LINEAR	·	3.2 km	MPC · JPL
117421	2005 AA_{18}	—	January 6, 2005	Socorro	LINEAR	·	1.6 km	MPC · JPL
117422	2005 AG_{18}	—	January 6, 2005	Socorro	LINEAR	NYS	2.0 km	MPC · JPL
117423	2005 AP_{18}	—	January 7, 2005	Socorro	LINEAR	L5	17 km	MPC · JPL
117424	2005 AX_{19}	—	January 6, 2005	Socorro	LINEAR	·	3.9 km	MPC · JPL
117425	2005 AK_{20}	—	January 6, 2005	Socorro	LINEAR	KOR	3.0 km	MPC · JPL
117426	2005 AM_{20}	—	January 6, 2005	Socorro	LINEAR	·	2.4 km	MPC · JPL
117427	2005 AY_{21}	—	January 6, 2005	Goodricke-Pigott	R. A. Tucker	MAR	2.3 km	MPC · JPL
117428	2005 AS_{22}	—	January 7, 2005	Socorro	LINEAR	·	4.0 km	MPC · JPL
117429	2005 AR_{25}	—	January 11, 2005	Socorro	LINEAR	·	1.9 km	MPC · JPL
117430 Achosyx	2005 AQ_{26}	Achosyx	January 13, 2005	New Mexico Skies	Lowe, A.	·	7.0 km	MPC · JPL
117431	2005 AL_{28}	—	January 13, 2005	Socorro	LINEAR	·	2.7 km	MPC · JPL
117432	2005 AQ_{28}	—	January 7, 2005	Socorro	LINEAR	·	2.2 km	MPC · JPL
117433	2005 AC_{29}	—	January 15, 2005	Catalina	CSS	T_{j} (2.99)	7.9 km	MPC · JPL
117434	2005 AE_{29}	—	January 13, 2005	Kitt Peak	Spacewatch	V	1.4 km	MPC · JPL
117435 Severochoa	2005 AJ_{29}	Severochoa	January 14, 2005	La Cañada	Lacruz, J.	HOF	4.5 km	MPC · JPL
117436	2005 AU_{30}	—	January 9, 2005	Catalina	CSS	·	3.3 km	MPC · JPL
117437	2005 AW_{30}	—	January 9, 2005	Catalina	CSS	EUN	2.5 km	MPC · JPL
117438	2005 AX_{35}	—	January 13, 2005	Socorro	LINEAR	(5)	1.9 km	MPC · JPL
117439 Rosner	2005 AR_{36}	Rosner	January 13, 2005	New Mexico Skies	Lowe, A.	·	1.9 km	MPC · JPL
117440	2005 AM_{37}	—	January 13, 2005	Kitt Peak	Spacewatch	·	4.6 km	MPC · JPL
117441	2005 AY_{38}	—	January 13, 2005	Kitt Peak	Spacewatch	·	2.3 km	MPC · JPL
117442	2005 AP_{39}	—	January 13, 2005	Socorro	LINEAR	·	4.0 km	MPC · JPL
117443	2005 AW_{42}	—	January 15, 2005	Socorro	LINEAR	(5)	2.2 km	MPC · JPL
117444	2005 AJ_{43}	—	January 15, 2005	Socorro	LINEAR	·	1.5 km	MPC · JPL
117445	2005 AB_{45}	—	January 15, 2005	Kitt Peak	Spacewatch	MAS	1.6 km	MPC · JPL
117446	2005 AV_{45}	—	January 11, 2005	Socorro	LINEAR	L5	15 km	MPC · JPL
117447	2005 AX_{46}	—	January 11, 2005	Socorro	LINEAR	L5	31 km	MPC · JPL
117448	2005 AY_{46}	—	January 11, 2005	Socorro	LINEAR	NYS	1.9 km	MPC · JPL
117449	2005 AB_{47}	—	January 12, 2005	Socorro	LINEAR	·	4.7 km	MPC · JPL
117450	2005 AD_{47}	—	January 12, 2005	Socorro	LINEAR	EOS	4.8 km	MPC · JPL
117451	2005 AA_{50}	—	January 13, 2005	Catalina	CSS	·	3.6 km	MPC · JPL
117452	2005 AV_{55}	—	January 15, 2005	Socorro	LINEAR	·	2.4 km	MPC · JPL
117453	2005 AG_{58}	—	January 15, 2005	Socorro	LINEAR	·	3.2 km	MPC · JPL
117454	2005 AG_{59}	—	January 15, 2005	Socorro	LINEAR	KOR	2.3 km	MPC · JPL
117455	2005 AL_{61}	—	January 15, 2005	Kitt Peak	Spacewatch	·	2.3 km	MPC · JPL
117456	2005 AL_{68}	—	January 13, 2005	Anderson Mesa	LONEOS	·	1.2 km	MPC · JPL
117457	2005 AU_{68}	—	January 13, 2005	Kitt Peak	Spacewatch	·	2.9 km	MPC · JPL
117458	2005 AN_{71}	—	January 15, 2005	Kitt Peak	Spacewatch	·	4.1 km	MPC · JPL
117459	2005 AB_{74}	—	January 15, 2005	Kitt Peak	Spacewatch	NYS	2.7 km	MPC · JPL
117460	2005 AM_{74}	—	January 15, 2005	Kitt Peak	Spacewatch	(159)	5.2 km	MPC · JPL
117461	2005 AO_{79}	—	January 15, 2005	Kitt Peak	Spacewatch	·	3.7 km	MPC · JPL
117462	2005 BK_{3}	—	January 16, 2005	Anderson Mesa	LONEOS	·	5.7 km	MPC · JPL
117463	2005 BQ_{7}	—	January 16, 2005	Catalina	CSS	·	5.3 km	MPC · JPL
117464	2005 BT_{8}	—	January 16, 2005	Socorro	LINEAR	EOS	3.4 km	MPC · JPL
117465	2005 BJ_{9}	—	January 16, 2005	Socorro	LINEAR	·	4.9 km	MPC · JPL
117466	2005 BO_{9}	—	January 16, 2005	Socorro	LINEAR	·	1.1 km	MPC · JPL
117467	2005 BE_{11}	—	January 16, 2005	Kitt Peak	Spacewatch	·	2.7 km	MPC · JPL
117468	2005 BH_{11}	—	January 16, 2005	Kitt Peak	Spacewatch	·	3.2 km	MPC · JPL
117469	2005 BO_{11}	—	January 16, 2005	Kitt Peak	Spacewatch	·	2.2 km	MPC · JPL
117470	2005 BQ_{11}	—	January 16, 2005	Kitt Peak	Spacewatch	·	3.9 km	MPC · JPL
117471	2005 BK_{13}	—	January 17, 2005	Kitt Peak	Spacewatch	EOS	4.5 km	MPC · JPL
117472	2005 BQ_{13}	—	January 17, 2005	Kitt Peak	Spacewatch	·	2.1 km	MPC · JPL
117473	2005 BS_{13}	—	January 17, 2005	Kitt Peak	Spacewatch	·	2.0 km	MPC · JPL
117474	2005 BE_{18}	—	January 16, 2005	Socorro	LINEAR	·	3.7 km	MPC · JPL
117475	2005 BK_{22}	—	January 16, 2005	Kitt Peak	Spacewatch	·	4.0 km	MPC · JPL
117476	2005 BP_{22}	—	January 16, 2005	Kitt Peak	Spacewatch	·	5.8 km	MPC · JPL
117477	2005 BC_{25}	—	January 17, 2005	Socorro	LINEAR	·	4.7 km	MPC · JPL
117478	2005 BD_{26}	—	January 18, 2005	Catalina	CSS	NYS	1.4 km	MPC · JPL
117479	2005 BT_{26}	—	January 19, 2005	Kitt Peak	Spacewatch	·	4.0 km	MPC · JPL
117480	2005 BO_{28}	—	January 31, 2005	Socorro	LINEAR	EUN	2.9 km	MPC · JPL
117481	2005 BD_{44}	—	January 31, 2005	New Mexico Skies	Lowe, A.	·	3.1 km	MPC · JPL
117482	2005 CD_{2}	—	February 1, 2005	Kitt Peak	Spacewatch	KOR	2.3 km	MPC · JPL
117483	2005 CZ_{3}	—	February 1, 2005	Kitt Peak	Spacewatch	NYS ·	2.8 km	MPC · JPL
117484	2005 CE_{6}	—	February 1, 2005	Kitt Peak	Spacewatch	·	5.9 km	MPC · JPL
117485	2005 CZ_{9}	—	February 1, 2005	Kitt Peak	Spacewatch	·	2.2 km	MPC · JPL
117486	2005 CN_{10}	—	February 1, 2005	Kitt Peak	Spacewatch	·	4.9 km	MPC · JPL
117487	2005 CM_{13}	—	February 2, 2005	Palomar	NEAT	·	2.9 km	MPC · JPL
117488	2005 CT_{14}	—	February 2, 2005	Kitt Peak	Spacewatch	·	1.6 km	MPC · JPL
117489	2005 CB_{16}	—	February 2, 2005	Socorro	LINEAR	·	2.1 km	MPC · JPL
117490	2005 CE_{16}	—	February 2, 2005	Socorro	LINEAR	·	3.9 km	MPC · JPL
117491	2005 CC_{17}	—	February 2, 2005	Socorro	LINEAR	·	1.3 km	MPC · JPL
117492	2005 CK_{18}	—	February 2, 2005	Catalina	CSS	NYS	1.7 km	MPC · JPL
117493	2005 CP_{19}	—	February 2, 2005	Catalina	CSS	NYS	2.2 km	MPC · JPL
117494	2005 CU_{19}	—	February 2, 2005	Catalina	CSS	·	3.7 km	MPC · JPL
117495	2005 CY_{19}	—	February 2, 2005	Kitt Peak	Spacewatch	NYS	2.0 km	MPC · JPL
117496	2005 CD_{20}	—	February 2, 2005	Catalina	CSS	·	4.1 km	MPC · JPL
117497	2005 CL_{20}	—	February 2, 2005	Catalina	CSS	·	2.6 km	MPC · JPL
117498	2005 CJ_{21}	—	February 2, 2005	Catalina	CSS	·	3.1 km	MPC · JPL
117499	2005 CQ_{21}	—	February 2, 2005	Catalina	CSS	·	2.3 km	MPC · JPL
117500	2005 CY_{21}	—	February 3, 2005	Socorro	LINEAR	·	5.5 km	MPC · JPL

== 117501–117600 ==
back to top

Designation			Discovery			Properties		Ref
Permanent	Provisional	Named after	Date	Site	Discoverer(s)	Category	Diam.	Ref
117501	2005 CQ_{22}	—	February 1, 2005	Catalina	CSS	·	8.3 km	MPC · JPL
117502	2005 CW_{22}	—	February 1, 2005	Catalina	CSS	526	5.1 km	MPC · JPL
117503	2005 CA_{23}	—	February 1, 2005	Catalina	CSS	·	7.5 km	MPC · JPL
117504	2005 CD_{23}	—	February 1, 2005	Catalina	CSS	·	2.5 km	MPC · JPL
117505	2005 CG_{25}	—	February 4, 2005	Palomar	NEAT	·	5.3 km	MPC · JPL
117506 Wildberg	2005 CO_{25}	Wildberg	February 5, 2005	Wildberg	R. Apitzsch	·	1.1 km	MPC · JPL
117507	2005 CT_{25}	—	February 1, 2005	Kitt Peak	Spacewatch	EUP	7.5 km	MPC · JPL
117508	2005 CA_{36}	—	February 3, 2005	Palomar	NEAT	·	6.5 km	MPC · JPL
117509	2005 CV_{36}	—	February 3, 2005	Socorro	LINEAR	·	4.1 km	MPC · JPL
117510	2005 CE_{40}	—	February 5, 2005	Bergisch Gladbach	W. Bickel	·	2.3 km	MPC · JPL
117511	2005 CD_{41}	—	February 5, 2005	Cordell-Lorenz	D. T. Durig, Nixon, V. L.	MAS	1.4 km	MPC · JPL
117512	2005 CZ_{42}	—	February 2, 2005	Socorro	LINEAR	·	2.7 km	MPC · JPL
117513	2005 CA_{43}	—	February 2, 2005	Socorro	LINEAR	NYS	1.8 km	MPC · JPL
117514	2005 CD_{49}	—	February 2, 2005	Socorro	LINEAR	·	6.2 km	MPC · JPL
117515	2005 CH_{49}	—	February 2, 2005	Catalina	CSS	·	2.2 km	MPC · JPL
117516	2005 CJ_{49}	—	February 2, 2005	Catalina	CSS	·	2.7 km	MPC · JPL
117517	2005 CE_{50}	—	February 2, 2005	Socorro	LINEAR	NYS	2.1 km	MPC · JPL
117518	2005 CW_{50}	—	February 2, 2005	Socorro	LINEAR	V	1.1 km	MPC · JPL
117519	2005 CM_{51}	—	February 2, 2005	Kitt Peak	Spacewatch	·	1.8 km	MPC · JPL
117520	2005 CP_{51}	—	February 2, 2005	Catalina	CSS	·	2.4 km	MPC · JPL
117521	2005 CU_{51}	—	February 2, 2005	Kitt Peak	Spacewatch	·	1.3 km	MPC · JPL
117522	2005 CB_{52}	—	February 2, 2005	Kitt Peak	Spacewatch	·	1.2 km	MPC · JPL
117523	2005 CD_{52}	—	February 2, 2005	Kitt Peak	Spacewatch	·	4.5 km	MPC · JPL
117524	2005 CA_{53}	—	February 3, 2005	Socorro	LINEAR	NYS	2.2 km	MPC · JPL
117525	2005 CJ_{53}	—	February 3, 2005	Socorro	LINEAR	NYS	1.7 km	MPC · JPL
117526	2005 CS_{57}	—	February 2, 2005	Socorro	LINEAR	·	3.8 km	MPC · JPL
117527	2005 CU_{58}	—	February 2, 2005	Catalina	CSS	·	1.6 km	MPC · JPL
117528	2005 CZ_{58}	—	February 2, 2005	Catalina	CSS	·	2.4 km	MPC · JPL
117529	2005 CM_{59}	—	February 2, 2005	Socorro	LINEAR	·	1.8 km	MPC · JPL
117530	2005 CP_{59}	—	February 2, 2005	Palomar	NEAT	·	2.3 km	MPC · JPL
117531	2005 CU_{59}	—	February 2, 2005	Catalina	CSS	V	1.3 km	MPC · JPL
117532	2005 CA_{60}	—	February 3, 2005	Socorro	LINEAR	·	9.7 km	MPC · JPL
117533	2005 CU_{62}	—	February 9, 2005	Kitt Peak	Spacewatch	·	4.8 km	MPC · JPL
117534	2005 CA_{64}	—	February 9, 2005	Anderson Mesa	LONEOS	·	4.4 km	MPC · JPL
117535	2005 CC_{67}	—	February 9, 2005	Socorro	LINEAR	·	5.3 km	MPC · JPL
117536	2005 CT_{67}	—	February 2, 2005	Kitt Peak	Spacewatch	·	4.4 km	MPC · JPL
117537	2005 CH_{76}	—	February 2, 2005	Socorro	LINEAR	·	1.4 km	MPC · JPL
117538	2005 DU	—	February 20, 2005	Socorro	LINEAR	PHO	3.2 km	MPC · JPL
117539 Celletti	2005 DJ_{1}	Celletti	February 17, 2005	La Silla	A. Boattini, H. Scholl	·	5.8 km	MPC · JPL
117540	2005 EN	—	March 1, 2005	Goodricke-Pigott	R. A. Tucker	·	1.2 km	MPC · JPL
117541	2005 EQ	—	March 1, 2005	Socorro	LINEAR	HNS	2.1 km	MPC · JPL
117542	2005 EV	—	March 2, 2005	New Mexico Skies	Lowe, A.	·	3.4 km	MPC · JPL
117543	2005 EM_{1}	—	March 3, 2005	New Mexico Skies	Lowe, A.	MAS	1.4 km	MPC · JPL
117544	2005 EZ_{1}	—	March 2, 2005	Socorro	LINEAR	PHO	1.8 km	MPC · JPL
117545	2005 EN_{5}	—	March 1, 2005	Kitt Peak	Spacewatch	·	3.6 km	MPC · JPL
117546	2005 ET_{5}	—	March 1, 2005	Kitt Peak	Spacewatch	·	7.6 km	MPC · JPL
117547	2005 ES_{7}	—	March 1, 2005	Kitt Peak	Spacewatch	·	5.3 km	MPC · JPL
117548	2005 EY_{7}	—	March 1, 2005	Kitt Peak	Spacewatch	·	1.9 km	MPC · JPL
117549	2005 EH_{8}	—	March 1, 2005	Kitt Peak	Spacewatch	·	1.8 km	MPC · JPL
117550	2005 EU_{8}	—	March 2, 2005	Kitt Peak	Spacewatch	·	1.1 km	MPC · JPL
117551	2005 EL_{10}	—	March 2, 2005	Kitt Peak	Spacewatch	·	2.3 km	MPC · JPL
117552	2005 EC_{11}	—	March 2, 2005	Kitt Peak	Spacewatch	·	2.1 km	MPC · JPL
117553	2005 EZ_{11}	—	March 2, 2005	Catalina	CSS	·	3.5 km	MPC · JPL
117554	2005 EN_{13}	—	March 3, 2005	Kitt Peak	Spacewatch	·	2.6 km	MPC · JPL
117555	2005 EP_{13}	—	March 3, 2005	Kitt Peak	Spacewatch	KOR	3.2 km	MPC · JPL
117556	2005 EQ_{14}	—	March 3, 2005	Kitt Peak	Spacewatch	·	2.9 km	MPC · JPL
117557	2005 EG_{22}	—	March 3, 2005	Catalina	CSS	·	4.3 km	MPC · JPL
117558	2005 EN_{23}	—	March 3, 2005	Catalina	CSS	PHO	1.8 km	MPC · JPL
117559	2005 ED_{24}	—	March 3, 2005	Catalina	CSS	·	2.4 km	MPC · JPL
117560	2005 EL_{24}	—	March 3, 2005	Catalina	CSS	NYS	1.9 km	MPC · JPL
117561	2005 EY_{24}	—	March 3, 2005	Catalina	CSS	·	1.9 km	MPC · JPL
117562 Jeffreyferguson	2005 EB_{25}	Jeffreyferguson	March 3, 2005	Catalina	CSS	·	2.0 km	MPC · JPL
117563 Hollyoscarson	2005 EK_{25}	Hollyoscarson	March 3, 2005	Catalina	CSS	NYS	2.4 km	MPC · JPL
117564	2005 EW_{26}	—	March 3, 2005	Catalina	CSS	·	2.5 km	MPC · JPL
117565 Alanstrauss	2005 EN_{29}	Alanstrauss	March 3, 2005	Catalina	CSS	·	3.3 km	MPC · JPL
117566	2005 EG_{30}	—	March 4, 2005	New Mexico Skies	Lowe, A.	·	1.7 km	MPC · JPL
117567	2005 EJ_{30}	—	March 4, 2005	New Mexico Skies	Lowe, A.	EOS	3.1 km	MPC · JPL
117568 Yadame	2005 EK_{30}	Yadame	March 5, 2005	Kitami	K. Endate	·	2.5 km	MPC · JPL
117569 Rileyharris	2005 EO_{32}	Rileyharris	March 3, 2005	Catalina	CSS	·	2.3 km	MPC · JPL
117570	2005 ET_{32}	—	March 3, 2005	Catalina	CSS	·	5.7 km	MPC · JPL
117571	2005 EQ_{33}	—	March 3, 2005	Kitt Peak	Spacewatch	DOR	4.8 km	MPC · JPL
117572 Hutsebaut	2005 EX_{33}	Hutsebaut	March 8, 2005	New Mexico Skies	Lowe, A.	T_{j} (2.99) · EUP	8.9 km	MPC · JPL
117573	2005 EG_{34}	—	March 3, 2005	Catalina	CSS	·	2.5 km	MPC · JPL
117574	2005 EJ_{34}	—	March 3, 2005	Catalina	CSS	·	2.5 km	MPC · JPL
117575	2005 EN_{34}	—	March 3, 2005	Catalina	CSS	·	2.1 km	MPC · JPL
117576	2005 EU_{34}	—	March 3, 2005	Kitt Peak	Spacewatch	·	2.2 km	MPC · JPL
117577	2005 EE_{35}	—	March 3, 2005	Kitt Peak	Spacewatch	·	2.8 km	MPC · JPL
117578	2005 ET_{35}	—	March 4, 2005	Catalina	CSS	·	3.7 km	MPC · JPL
117579	2005 EU_{35}	—	March 4, 2005	Catalina	CSS	HYG	5.7 km	MPC · JPL
117580	2005 EW_{36}	—	March 4, 2005	Catalina	CSS	·	4.1 km	MPC · JPL
117581 Devinschrader	2005 EG_{37}	Devinschrader	March 4, 2005	Mount Lemmon	Mount Lemmon Survey	·	1.8 km	MPC · JPL
117582 Kenjikawai	2005 ED_{39}	Kenjikawai	March 7, 2005	Goodricke-Pigott	R. A. Tucker	·	2.2 km	MPC · JPL
117583	2005 EN_{41}	—	March 1, 2005	Kitt Peak	Spacewatch	·	2.7 km	MPC · JPL
117584	2005 EP_{41}	—	March 1, 2005	Kitt Peak	Spacewatch	·	6.9 km	MPC · JPL
117585	2005 EH_{43}	—	March 3, 2005	Kitt Peak	Spacewatch	NYS	1.6 km	MPC · JPL
117586 Twilatho	2005 EV_{43}	Twilatho	March 3, 2005	Jarnac	Jarnac	EMA	6.3 km	MPC · JPL
117587	2005 EG_{46}	—	March 3, 2005	Catalina	CSS	HOF	4.1 km	MPC · JPL
117588	2005 EY_{46}	—	March 3, 2005	Catalina	CSS	·	2.0 km	MPC · JPL
117589	2005 EL_{48}	—	March 3, 2005	Catalina	CSS	V	1.1 km	MPC · JPL
117590	2005 EX_{48}	—	March 3, 2005	Catalina	CSS	·	1.8 km	MPC · JPL
117591	2005 EL_{50}	—	March 3, 2005	Catalina	CSS	·	3.8 km	MPC · JPL
117592	2005 ES_{51}	—	March 3, 2005	Catalina	CSS	·	1.7 km	MPC · JPL
117593	2005 EC_{52}	—	March 3, 2005	Catalina	CSS	HYG	6.3 km	MPC · JPL
117594	2005 EW_{53}	—	March 4, 2005	Kitt Peak	Spacewatch	·	1.2 km	MPC · JPL
117595 Jemmadavidson	2005 EG_{62}	Jemmadavidson	March 4, 2005	Mount Lemmon	Mount Lemmon Survey	·	5.2 km	MPC · JPL
117596 Richardkuhns	2005 EK_{64}	Richardkuhns	March 4, 2005	Mount Lemmon	Mount Lemmon Survey	HOF	5.2 km	MPC · JPL
117597	2005 ED_{65}	—	March 4, 2005	Socorro	LINEAR	·	2.0 km	MPC · JPL
117598	2005 EA_{69}	—	March 7, 2005	Socorro	LINEAR	HYG	5.5 km	MPC · JPL
117599	2005 EL_{69}	—	March 7, 2005	Socorro	LINEAR	NYS	2.3 km	MPC · JPL
117600	2005 EE_{71}	—	March 2, 2005	Kitt Peak	Spacewatch	·	2.0 km	MPC · JPL

== 117601–117700 ==
back to top

Designation			Discovery			Properties		Ref
Permanent	Provisional	Named after	Date	Site	Discoverer(s)	Category	Diam.	Ref
117601	2005 EH_{72}	—	March 2, 2005	Catalina	CSS	·	2.5 km	MPC · JPL
117602	2005 EF_{76}	—	March 3, 2005	Kitt Peak	Spacewatch	·	4.1 km	MPC · JPL
117603	2005 ER_{76}	—	March 3, 2005	Kitt Peak	Spacewatch	·	2.2 km	MPC · JPL
117604	2005 EN_{78}	—	March 3, 2005	Catalina	CSS	·	1.9 km	MPC · JPL
117605	2005 EF_{86}	—	March 4, 2005	Socorro	LINEAR	·	1.8 km	MPC · JPL
117606	2005 ES_{89}	—	March 8, 2005	Socorro	LINEAR	·	1.3 km	MPC · JPL
117607	2005 EZ_{89}	—	March 8, 2005	Anderson Mesa	LONEOS	·	6.6 km	MPC · JPL
117608	2005 EE_{90}	—	March 8, 2005	Anderson Mesa	LONEOS	·	3.9 km	MPC · JPL
117609	2005 EP_{90}	—	March 8, 2005	Socorro	LINEAR	·	1.9 km	MPC · JPL
117610 Keithmahoney	2005 ES_{91}	Keithmahoney	March 8, 2005	Mount Lemmon	Mount Lemmon Survey	·	5.1 km	MPC · JPL
117611	2005 EB_{92}	—	March 8, 2005	Anderson Mesa	LONEOS	·	1.1 km	MPC · JPL
117612	2005 EW_{92}	—	March 8, 2005	Anderson Mesa	LONEOS	·	1.6 km	MPC · JPL
117613	2005 EA_{93}	—	March 8, 2005	Socorro	LINEAR	·	2.5 km	MPC · JPL
117614 Hannahmclain	2005 EU_{94}	Hannahmclain	March 8, 2005	Mount Lemmon	Mount Lemmon Survey	·	2.3 km	MPC · JPL
117615	2005 EY_{94}	—	March 10, 2005	New Mexico Skies	Lowe, A.	·	2.6 km	MPC · JPL
117616	2005 EX_{95}	—	March 11, 2005	Catalina	CSS	BAR	2.6 km	MPC · JPL
117617	2005 EJ_{96}	—	March 3, 2005	Catalina	CSS	MAR	2.0 km	MPC · JPL
117618	2005 EN_{96}	—	March 3, 2005	Catalina	CSS	·	3.4 km	MPC · JPL
117619	2005 ES_{98}	—	March 3, 2005	Catalina	CSS	AST	3.5 km	MPC · JPL
117620	2005 EE_{100}	—	March 3, 2005	Catalina	CSS	·	11 km	MPC · JPL
117621	2005 EU_{100}	—	March 3, 2005	Catalina	CSS	GEF	2.2 km	MPC · JPL
117622	2005 EK_{101}	—	March 3, 2005	Kitt Peak	Spacewatch	·	2.8 km	MPC · JPL
117623	2005 ER_{115}	—	March 4, 2005	Socorro	LINEAR	·	5.9 km	MPC · JPL
117624	2005 EX_{117}	—	March 7, 2005	Socorro	LINEAR	JUN	2.0 km	MPC · JPL
117625	2005 EN_{118}	—	March 7, 2005	Socorro	LINEAR	·	3.8 km	MPC · JPL
117626	2005 EO_{118}	—	March 7, 2005	Socorro	LINEAR	·	2.6 km	MPC · JPL
117627	2005 EW_{118}	—	March 7, 2005	Socorro	LINEAR	MAR	1.4 km	MPC · JPL
117628	2005 EH_{119}	—	March 7, 2005	Socorro	LINEAR	EOS	3.6 km	MPC · JPL
117629	2005 ET_{121}	—	March 8, 2005	Socorro	LINEAR	·	2.0 km	MPC · JPL
117630	2005 EE_{124}	—	March 8, 2005	Anderson Mesa	LONEOS	·	4.8 km	MPC · JPL
117631	2005 EM_{124}	—	March 8, 2005	Anderson Mesa	LONEOS	NYS	1.6 km	MPC · JPL
117632	2005 ES_{126}	—	March 8, 2005	Mount Lemmon	Mount Lemmon Survey	·	5.7 km	MPC · JPL
117633	2005 EM_{127}	—	March 9, 2005	Kitt Peak	Spacewatch	KOR	2.1 km	MPC · JPL
117634	2005 EJ_{128}	—	March 9, 2005	Kitt Peak	Spacewatch	·	2.4 km	MPC · JPL
117635	2005 EQ_{129}	—	March 9, 2005	Mount Lemmon	Mount Lemmon Survey	·	2.3 km	MPC · JPL
117636	2005 ED_{130}	—	March 9, 2005	Kitt Peak	Spacewatch	·	3.0 km	MPC · JPL
117637	2005 EJ_{131}	—	March 9, 2005	Catalina	CSS	GEF	2.4 km	MPC · JPL
117638	2005 EN_{132}	—	March 9, 2005	Anderson Mesa	LONEOS	·	1.7 km	MPC · JPL
117639	2005 EE_{133}	—	March 9, 2005	Catalina	CSS	·	8.0 km	MPC · JPL
117640 Millsellie	2005 EK_{137}	Millsellie	March 9, 2005	Mount Lemmon	Mount Lemmon Survey	·	1.2 km	MPC · JPL
117641	2005 EQ_{137}	—	March 9, 2005	Mount Lemmon	Mount Lemmon Survey	·	2.9 km	MPC · JPL
117642	2005 EB_{138}	—	March 9, 2005	Mount Lemmon	Mount Lemmon Survey	·	2.7 km	MPC · JPL
117643	2005 ED_{138}	—	March 9, 2005	Socorro	LINEAR	slow	4.3 km	MPC · JPL
117644	2005 EC_{139}	—	March 9, 2005	Mount Lemmon	Mount Lemmon Survey	(2076)	1.5 km	MPC · JPL
117645	2005 ER_{139}	—	March 9, 2005	Mount Lemmon	Mount Lemmon Survey	(11097)	4.4 km	MPC · JPL
117646	2005 EW_{139}	—	March 9, 2005	Mount Lemmon	Mount Lemmon Survey	·	3.6 km	MPC · JPL
117647	2005 ED_{140}	—	March 9, 2005	Socorro	LINEAR	·	3.1 km	MPC · JPL
117648	2005 EF_{147}	—	March 10, 2005	Anderson Mesa	LONEOS	·	3.4 km	MPC · JPL
117649	2005 EG_{147}	—	March 10, 2005	Anderson Mesa	LONEOS	·	1.5 km	MPC · JPL
117650	2005 EO_{151}	—	March 10, 2005	Kitt Peak	Spacewatch	V	930 m	MPC · JPL
117651	2005 EC_{153}	—	March 2, 2005	Catalina	CSS	·	1.6 km	MPC · JPL
117652 Joséaponte	2005 EY_{161}	Joséaponte	March 9, 2005	Mount Lemmon	Mount Lemmon Survey	·	3.0 km	MPC · JPL
117653	2005 EG_{168}	—	March 11, 2005	Mount Lemmon	Mount Lemmon Survey	THM	4.2 km	MPC · JPL
117654	2005 EA_{172}	—	March 7, 2005	Socorro	LINEAR	NYS	1.6 km	MPC · JPL
117655	2005 EG_{182}	—	March 9, 2005	Anderson Mesa	LONEOS	KOR	2.9 km	MPC · JPL
117656	2005 EJ_{187}	—	March 10, 2005	Mount Lemmon	Mount Lemmon Survey	·	5.7 km	MPC · JPL
117657 Jamieelsila	2005 EP_{187}	Jamieelsila	March 10, 2005	Mount Lemmon	Mount Lemmon Survey	·	1.4 km	MPC · JPL
117658	2005 ER_{187}	—	March 10, 2005	Mount Lemmon	Mount Lemmon Survey	·	1.9 km	MPC · JPL
117659	2005 EB_{189}	—	March 10, 2005	Siding Spring	SSS	URS	8.3 km	MPC · JPL
117660	2005 ED_{197}	—	March 11, 2005	Mount Lemmon	Mount Lemmon Survey	·	960 m	MPC · JPL
117661	2005 EH_{198}	—	March 11, 2005	Mount Lemmon	Mount Lemmon Survey	·	5.9 km	MPC · JPL
117662	2005 EU_{198}	—	March 11, 2005	Mount Lemmon	Mount Lemmon Survey	NYS	1.7 km	MPC · JPL
117663	2005 EK_{199}	—	March 12, 2005	Anderson Mesa	LONEOS	·	4.6 km	MPC · JPL
117664	2005 EF_{200}	—	March 12, 2005	Kitt Peak	Spacewatch	·	4.0 km	MPC · JPL
117665	2005 EM_{201}	—	March 8, 2005	Catalina	CSS	EUN	2.6 km	MPC · JPL
117666	2005 ER_{201}	—	March 8, 2005	Catalina	CSS	·	7.1 km	MPC · JPL
117667	2005 EC_{205}	—	March 11, 2005	Kitt Peak	Spacewatch	3:2	7.2 km	MPC · JPL
117668	2005 EN_{207}	—	March 9, 2005	Catalina	CSS	·	2.5 km	MPC · JPL
117669	2005 ER_{207}	—	March 11, 2005	Socorro	LINEAR	·	2.3 km	MPC · JPL
117670	2005 EG_{210}	—	March 4, 2005	Kitt Peak	Spacewatch	NYS	1.4 km	MPC · JPL
117671	2005 ES_{211}	—	March 4, 2005	Mount Lemmon	Mount Lemmon Survey	·	1.9 km	MPC · JPL
117672	2005 EV_{211}	—	March 4, 2005	Catalina	CSS	·	3.5 km	MPC · JPL
117673	2005 EB_{214}	—	March 7, 2005	Socorro	LINEAR	·	2.4 km	MPC · JPL
117674	2005 EE_{214}	—	March 7, 2005	Socorro	LINEAR	NYS	1.7 km	MPC · JPL
117675	2005 EK_{214}	—	March 8, 2005	Anderson Mesa	LONEOS	·	2.9 km	MPC · JPL
117676	2005 EZ_{219}	—	March 10, 2005	Siding Spring	SSS	EUN	2.6 km	MPC · JPL
117677	2005 EL_{221}	—	March 11, 2005	Mount Lemmon	Mount Lemmon Survey	·	4.9 km	MPC · JPL
117678	2005 EX_{222}	—	March 8, 2005	Socorro	LINEAR	BRA	3.9 km	MPC · JPL
117679	2005 EF_{223}	—	March 10, 2005	Anderson Mesa	LONEOS	·	2.9 km	MPC · JPL
117680	2005 EW_{223}	—	March 13, 2005	Kitt Peak	Spacewatch	NYS	1.6 km	MPC · JPL
117681	2005 ES_{226}	—	March 9, 2005	Socorro	LINEAR	·	6.4 km	MPC · JPL
117682	2005 EW_{227}	—	March 9, 2005	Socorro	LINEAR	·	7.4 km	MPC · JPL
117683	2005 ER_{233}	—	March 10, 2005	Anderson Mesa	LONEOS	·	2.5 km	MPC · JPL
117684	2005 EL_{246}	—	March 12, 2005	Kitt Peak	Spacewatch	·	1.3 km	MPC · JPL
117685	2005 ED_{247}	—	March 12, 2005	Kitt Peak	Spacewatch	NYS	2.1 km	MPC · JPL
117686	2005 EU_{251}	—	March 10, 2005	Catalina	CSS	·	3.1 km	MPC · JPL
117687	2005 EX_{259}	—	March 11, 2005	Mount Lemmon	Mount Lemmon Survey	NYS	1.8 km	MPC · JPL
117688	2005 EX_{268}	—	March 14, 2005	Mount Lemmon	Mount Lemmon Survey	KOR	2.1 km	MPC · JPL
117689	2005 EY_{268}	—	March 14, 2005	Mount Lemmon	Mount Lemmon Survey	·	2.9 km	MPC · JPL
117690	2005 EK_{270}	—	March 12, 2005	Kitt Peak	Spacewatch	MAS	1.1 km	MPC · JPL
117691	2005 ES_{276}	—	March 8, 2005	Mount Lemmon	Mount Lemmon Survey	·	1.9 km	MPC · JPL
117692	2005 ED_{277}	—	March 8, 2005	Socorro	LINEAR	H	1.5 km	MPC · JPL
117693	2005 EF_{279}	—	March 9, 2005	Mount Lemmon	Mount Lemmon Survey	V	1.1 km	MPC · JPL
117694	2005 ED_{282}	—	March 10, 2005	Anderson Mesa	LONEOS	PHO	2.5 km	MPC · JPL
117695	2005 EE_{282}	—	March 10, 2005	Anderson Mesa	LONEOS	·	5.3 km	MPC · JPL
117696	2005 EU_{282}	—	March 10, 2005	Catalina	CSS	·	7.3 km	MPC · JPL
117697	2005 EA_{287}	—	March 10, 2005	Catalina	CSS	·	3.5 km	MPC · JPL
117698	2005 ED_{290}	—	March 9, 2005	Mount Lemmon	Mount Lemmon Survey	(7744)	2.1 km	MPC · JPL
117699	2005 EK_{290}	—	March 9, 2005	Siding Spring	SSS	·	2.9 km	MPC · JPL
117700	2005 EZ_{292}	—	March 10, 2005	Anderson Mesa	LONEOS	·	1.8 km	MPC · JPL

== 117701–117800 ==
back to top

Designation			Discovery			Properties		Ref
Permanent	Provisional	Named after	Date	Site	Discoverer(s)	Category	Diam.	Ref
117701	2005 EC_{293}	—	March 10, 2005	Catalina	CSS	·	2.5 km	MPC · JPL
117702	2005 EO_{295}	—	March 3, 2005	Kitt Peak	Spacewatch	AST	3.9 km	MPC · JPL
117703 Ochoa	2005 EK_{300}	Ochoa	March 11, 2005	Kitt Peak	M. W. Buie	KOR	1.5 km	MPC · JPL
117704 Lopez-Alegria	2005 EN_{317}	Lopez-Alegria	March 12, 2005	Kitt Peak	M. W. Buie	·	1.5 km	MPC · JPL
117705	2005 FS_{2}	—	March 18, 2005	Catalina	CSS	·	2.4 km	MPC · JPL
117706	2005 FU_{2}	—	March 18, 2005	Catalina	CSS	H	1.4 km	MPC · JPL
117707	2005 FJ_{5}	—	March 31, 2005	Anderson Mesa	LONEOS	HNS	2.9 km	MPC · JPL
117708	2005 FP_{5}	—	March 30, 2005	Goodricke-Pigott	Kumar, P.	EOS	3.5 km	MPC · JPL
117709	2005 FU_{6}	—	March 30, 2005	Catalina	CSS	·	4.5 km	MPC · JPL
117710	2005 FC_{7}	—	March 31, 2005	Anderson Mesa	LONEOS	·	6.9 km	MPC · JPL
117711 Degenfeld	2005 GA	Degenfeld	April 1, 2005	Piszkéstető	K. Sárneczky	·	2.1 km	MPC · JPL
117712 Podmaniczky	2005 GD	Podmaniczky	April 1, 2005	Piszkéstető	K. Sárneczky	NYS	2.2 km	MPC · JPL
117713 Kövesligethy	2005 GG_{1}	Kövesligethy	April 2, 2005	Piszkéstető	K. Sárneczky	NYS	1.4 km	MPC · JPL
117714 Kiskartal	2005 GH_{1}	Kiskartal	April 2, 2005	Piszkéstető	K. Sárneczky	EOS	3.3 km	MPC · JPL
117715 Carlkirby	2005 GK_{1}	Carlkirby	April 2, 2005	New Mexico Skies	Hutsebaut, R.	EOS ·	8.3 km	MPC · JPL
117716	2005 GN_{1}	—	April 1, 2005	Anderson Mesa	LONEOS	·	6.2 km	MPC · JPL
117717	2005 GD_{5}	—	April 1, 2005	Kitt Peak	Spacewatch	·	6.2 km	MPC · JPL
117718	2005 GZ_{5}	—	April 1, 2005	Kitt Peak	Spacewatch	·	1.5 km	MPC · JPL
117719	2005 GL_{7}	—	April 1, 2005	Anderson Mesa	LONEOS	·	1.7 km	MPC · JPL
117720	2005 GB_{8}	—	April 2, 2005	Mount Lemmon	Mount Lemmon Survey	·	2.3 km	MPC · JPL
117721	2005 GE_{8}	—	April 2, 2005	Anderson Mesa	LONEOS	·	1.6 km	MPC · JPL
117722	2005 GA_{11}	—	April 1, 2005	Anderson Mesa	LONEOS	V	1.1 km	MPC · JPL
117723	2005 GN_{11}	—	April 1, 2005	Anderson Mesa	LONEOS	·	1.3 km	MPC · JPL
117724	2005 GW_{11}	—	April 1, 2005	Anderson Mesa	LONEOS	·	2.2 km	MPC · JPL
117725	2005 GU_{12}	—	April 1, 2005	Anderson Mesa	LONEOS	·	2.8 km	MPC · JPL
117726	2005 GC_{13}	—	April 1, 2005	Anderson Mesa	LONEOS	EUN	2.1 km	MPC · JPL
117727	2005 GJ_{13}	—	April 1, 2005	Anderson Mesa	LONEOS	·	2.3 km	MPC · JPL
117728	2005 GT_{13}	—	April 1, 2005	Anderson Mesa	LONEOS	GEF	2.4 km	MPC · JPL
117729	2005 GZ_{13}	—	April 1, 2005	Anderson Mesa	LONEOS	EUN	1.9 km	MPC · JPL
117730	2005 GV_{19}	—	April 2, 2005	Mount Lemmon	Mount Lemmon Survey	·	4.8 km	MPC · JPL
117731	2005 GY_{19}	—	April 2, 2005	Mount Lemmon	Mount Lemmon Survey	·	3.9 km	MPC · JPL
117732	2005 GA_{20}	—	April 2, 2005	Mount Lemmon	Mount Lemmon Survey	·	2.1 km	MPC · JPL
117733	2005 GF_{20}	—	April 2, 2005	Anderson Mesa	LONEOS	EUN	3.4 km	MPC · JPL
117734	2005 GG_{20}	—	April 2, 2005	Anderson Mesa	LONEOS	·	1.1 km	MPC · JPL
117735	2005 GQ_{20}	—	April 2, 2005	Mount Lemmon	Mount Lemmon Survey	·	2.6 km	MPC · JPL
117736 Sherrod	2005 GQ_{22}	Sherrod	April 4, 2005	Vicques	M. Ory	·	3.9 km	MPC · JPL
117737	2005 GX_{22}	—	April 1, 2005	Anderson Mesa	LONEOS	V	1.3 km	MPC · JPL
117738	2005 GS_{26}	—	April 2, 2005	Anderson Mesa	LONEOS	·	2.6 km	MPC · JPL
117739	2005 GD_{29}	—	April 4, 2005	Kitt Peak	Spacewatch	·	5.0 km	MPC · JPL
117740	2005 GH_{29}	—	April 4, 2005	Kitt Peak	Spacewatch	·	1.1 km	MPC · JPL
117741	2005 GD_{31}	—	April 4, 2005	Catalina	CSS	EUN	2.7 km	MPC · JPL
117742	2005 GW_{31}	—	April 4, 2005	Socorro	LINEAR	·	2.8 km	MPC · JPL
117743	2005 GU_{32}	—	April 4, 2005	Socorro	LINEAR	NYS	1.6 km	MPC · JPL
117744	2005 GL_{33}	—	April 4, 2005	Kitt Peak	Spacewatch	·	1.2 km	MPC · JPL
117745	2005 GP_{37}	—	April 2, 2005	Siding Spring	SSS	PHO	2.3 km	MPC · JPL
117746	2005 GS_{37}	—	April 2, 2005	Siding Spring	SSS	·	1.6 km	MPC · JPL
117747	2005 GW_{43}	—	April 5, 2005	Anderson Mesa	LONEOS	·	2.8 km	MPC · JPL
117748	2005 GC_{44}	—	April 5, 2005	Anderson Mesa	LONEOS	·	5.8 km	MPC · JPL
117749	2005 GG_{46}	—	April 5, 2005	Mount Lemmon	Mount Lemmon Survey	·	2.2 km	MPC · JPL
117750	2005 GF_{48}	—	April 5, 2005	Mount Lemmon	Mount Lemmon Survey	MAS	1.1 km	MPC · JPL
117751	2005 GL_{49}	—	April 5, 2005	Mount Lemmon	Mount Lemmon Survey	·	2.2 km	MPC · JPL
117752	2005 GS_{50}	—	April 7, 2005	New Mexico Skies	Lowe, A.	(6355)	6.1 km	MPC · JPL
117753	2005 GU_{53}	—	April 4, 2005	Mount Lemmon	Mount Lemmon Survey	·	2.4 km	MPC · JPL
117754	2005 GA_{54}	—	April 4, 2005	Socorro	LINEAR	·	4.2 km	MPC · JPL
117755	2005 GN_{58}	—	April 6, 2005	Mount Lemmon	Mount Lemmon Survey	·	1.9 km	MPC · JPL
117756	2005 GR_{58}	—	April 1, 2005	Anderson Mesa	LONEOS	·	1.5 km	MPC · JPL
117757 Waltermassey	2005 GD_{59}	Waltermassey	April 5, 2005	Catalina	CSS	GEF	2.3 km	MPC · JPL
117758	2005 GK_{60}	—	April 4, 2005	Catalina	CSS	EOS	3.3 km	MPC · JPL
117759	2005 GP_{60}	—	April 6, 2005	Anderson Mesa	LONEOS	·	1.4 km	MPC · JPL
117760	2005 GS_{64}	—	April 2, 2005	Catalina	CSS	·	5.0 km	MPC · JPL
117761	2005 GK_{65}	—	April 2, 2005	Palomar	NEAT	KOR	2.5 km	MPC · JPL
117762	2005 GD_{69}	—	April 2, 2005	Palomar	NEAT	(5)	2.1 km	MPC · JPL
117763	2005 GP_{72}	—	April 4, 2005	Catalina	CSS	·	2.2 km	MPC · JPL
117764	2005 GG_{73}	—	April 4, 2005	Catalina	CSS	·	5.4 km	MPC · JPL
117765	2005 GO_{74}	—	April 5, 2005	Anderson Mesa	LONEOS	·	2.0 km	MPC · JPL
117766	2005 GJ_{78}	—	April 6, 2005	Catalina	CSS	JUN	2.9 km	MPC · JPL
117767	2005 GM_{78}	—	April 6, 2005	Catalina	CSS	·	2.5 km	MPC · JPL
117768	2005 GK_{81}	—	April 1, 2005	Catalina	CSS	H	880 m	MPC · JPL
117769	2005 GP_{86}	—	April 4, 2005	Socorro	LINEAR	NYS	1.7 km	MPC · JPL
117770	2005 GZ_{88}	—	April 5, 2005	Palomar	NEAT	·	1.6 km	MPC · JPL
117771	2005 GD_{93}	—	April 6, 2005	Anderson Mesa	LONEOS	·	4.2 km	MPC · JPL
117772	2005 GZ_{95}	—	April 6, 2005	Socorro	LINEAR	·	1.7 km	MPC · JPL
117773	2005 GJ_{97}	—	April 7, 2005	Anderson Mesa	LONEOS	H	940 m	MPC · JPL
117774	2005 GV_{99}	—	April 7, 2005	Mount Lemmon	Mount Lemmon Survey	·	3.0 km	MPC · JPL
117775	2005 GX_{101}	—	April 9, 2005	Socorro	LINEAR	·	3.0 km	MPC · JPL
117776	2005 GY_{102}	—	April 9, 2005	Kitt Peak	Spacewatch	NYS	1.4 km	MPC · JPL
117777	2005 GW_{110}	—	April 6, 2005	Anderson Mesa	LONEOS	·	3.9 km	MPC · JPL
117778	2005 GO_{112}	—	April 6, 2005	Kitt Peak	Spacewatch	·	5.3 km	MPC · JPL
117779	2005 GX_{112}	—	April 6, 2005	Catalina	CSS	·	6.1 km	MPC · JPL
117780	2005 GY_{113}	—	April 9, 2005	Socorro	LINEAR	·	2.4 km	MPC · JPL
117781 Jamesfisher	2005 GF_{115}	Jamesfisher	April 10, 2005	Mount Lemmon	Mount Lemmon Survey	NEM	4.2 km	MPC · JPL
117782	2005 GL_{115}	—	April 10, 2005	Kitt Peak	Spacewatch	VER	4.7 km	MPC · JPL
117783 Indik	2005 GJ_{118}	Indik	April 11, 2005	Mount Lemmon	Mount Lemmon Survey	·	6.3 km	MPC · JPL
117784	2005 GG_{119}	—	April 11, 2005	Anderson Mesa	LONEOS	·	3.7 km	MPC · JPL
117785	2005 GJ_{121}	—	April 5, 2005	Mount Lemmon	Mount Lemmon Survey	·	1.7 km	MPC · JPL
117786	2005 GN_{121}	—	April 5, 2005	Kitt Peak	Spacewatch	·	1.3 km	MPC · JPL
117787	2005 GM_{123}	—	April 7, 2005	Kitt Peak	Spacewatch	·	3.2 km	MPC · JPL
117788	2005 GU_{123}	—	April 8, 2005	Socorro	LINEAR	·	4.3 km	MPC · JPL
117789	2005 GH_{127}	—	April 12, 2005	Anderson Mesa	LONEOS	EOS ·	5.8 km	MPC · JPL
117790	2005 GO_{128}	—	April 13, 2005	New Mexico Skies	Lowe, A.	·	4.5 km	MPC · JPL
117791	2005 GT_{128}	—	April 1, 2005	Catalina	CSS	EUP	6.6 km	MPC · JPL
117792	2005 GP_{132}	—	April 10, 2005	Kitt Peak	Spacewatch	NYS	2.0 km	MPC · JPL
117793	2005 GB_{135}	—	April 10, 2005	Mount Lemmon	Mount Lemmon Survey	MAS	1.1 km	MPC · JPL
117794	2005 GZ_{138}	—	April 12, 2005	Socorro	LINEAR	·	5.9 km	MPC · JPL
117795	2005 GJ_{140}	—	April 13, 2005	Socorro	LINEAR	·	2.2 km	MPC · JPL
117796	2005 GY_{140}	—	April 14, 2005	Reedy Creek	J. Broughton	·	3.1 km	MPC · JPL
117797	2005 GA_{141}	—	April 14, 2005	Reedy Creek	J. Broughton	·	1.6 km	MPC · JPL
117798	2005 GK_{150}	—	April 11, 2005	Kitt Peak	Spacewatch	·	3.8 km	MPC · JPL
117799	2005 GW_{151}	—	April 12, 2005	Kitt Peak	Spacewatch	NEM	4.1 km	MPC · JPL
117800	2005 GD_{161}	—	April 13, 2005	Socorro	LINEAR	·	3.5 km	MPC · JPL

== 117801–117900 ==
back to top

Designation			Discovery			Properties		Ref
Permanent	Provisional	Named after	Date	Site	Discoverer(s)	Category	Diam.	Ref
117801	2005 GX_{166}	—	April 11, 2005	Mount Lemmon	Mount Lemmon Survey	MAS	1.3 km	MPC · JPL
117802	2005 GG_{168}	—	April 11, 2005	Mount Lemmon	Mount Lemmon Survey	MAS	1.0 km	MPC · JPL
117803	2005 GH_{168}	—	April 11, 2005	Mount Lemmon	Mount Lemmon Survey	·	1.6 km	MPC · JPL
117804	2005 GK_{168}	—	April 11, 2005	Siding Spring	SSS	H	960 m	MPC · JPL
117805	2005 GP_{170}	—	April 12, 2005	Socorro	LINEAR	·	1.7 km	MPC · JPL
117806	2005 GB_{172}	—	April 13, 2005	Socorro	LINEAR	·	2.2 km	MPC · JPL
117807	2005 GC_{175}	—	April 14, 2005	Catalina	CSS	NEM	4.8 km	MPC · JPL
117808	2005 GM_{178}	—	April 15, 2005	Catalina	CSS	·	3.9 km	MPC · JPL
117809	2005 GR_{178}	—	April 15, 2005	Anderson Mesa	LONEOS	·	3.9 km	MPC · JPL
117810	2005 GS_{178}	—	April 15, 2005	Kitt Peak	Spacewatch	HOF	6.1 km	MPC · JPL
117811	2005 GO_{180}	—	April 12, 2005	Kitt Peak	Spacewatch	·	2.9 km	MPC · JPL
117812	2005 GH_{182}	—	April 15, 2005	Catalina	CSS	·	7.3 km	MPC · JPL
117813	2005 HO_{3}	—	April 17, 2005	Siding Spring	SSS	ADE	6.1 km	MPC · JPL
117814	2005 HG_{4}	—	April 30, 2005	New Mexico Skies	Lowe, A.	·	3.8 km	MPC · JPL
117815	2005 HM_{5}	—	April 30, 2005	Campo Imperatore	CINEOS	·	1.9 km	MPC · JPL
117816	2005 HB_{7}	—	April 28, 2005	Siding Spring	SSS	EUN	2.1 km	MPC · JPL
117817	2005 JH_{1}	—	May 3, 2005	Socorro	LINEAR	·	2.1 km	MPC · JPL
117818	2005 JS_{3}	—	May 1, 2005	Siding Spring	SSS	·	5.6 km	MPC · JPL
117819	2005 JJ_{4}	—	May 3, 2005	Catalina	CSS	V	1.2 km	MPC · JPL
117820	2005 JY_{4}	—	May 4, 2005	Kitt Peak	Spacewatch	EOS	5.3 km	MPC · JPL
117821	2005 JD_{5}	—	May 4, 2005	Catalina	CSS	PHO	1.8 km	MPC · JPL
117822	2005 JO_{5}	—	May 4, 2005	Catalina	CSS	·	11 km	MPC · JPL
117823	2005 JY_{24}	—	May 3, 2005	Kitt Peak	Spacewatch	·	2.4 km	MPC · JPL
117824	2005 JU_{27}	—	May 3, 2005	Catalina	CSS	·	2.7 km	MPC · JPL
117825	2005 JU_{29}	—	May 3, 2005	Socorro	LINEAR	·	3.5 km	MPC · JPL
117826	2005 JV_{31}	—	May 4, 2005	Anderson Mesa	LONEOS	·	3.4 km	MPC · JPL
117827	2005 JL_{32}	—	May 4, 2005	Socorro	LINEAR	·	1.4 km	MPC · JPL
117828	2005 JX_{32}	—	May 4, 2005	Socorro	LINEAR	·	4.5 km	MPC · JPL
117829	2005 JE_{39}	—	May 7, 2005	Kitt Peak	Spacewatch	KOR	2.4 km	MPC · JPL
117830	2005 JV_{40}	—	May 7, 2005	Mount Lemmon	Mount Lemmon Survey	·	1.1 km	MPC · JPL
117831	2005 JM_{48}	—	May 3, 2005	Kitt Peak	Spacewatch	(5)	2.4 km	MPC · JPL
117832	2005 JL_{55}	—	May 4, 2005	Kitt Peak	Spacewatch	L4	10 km	MPC · JPL
117833	2005 JO_{55}	—	May 4, 2005	Palomar	NEAT	KOR	2.5 km	MPC · JPL
117834	2005 JO_{60}	—	May 8, 2005	Socorro	LINEAR	·	2.1 km	MPC · JPL
117835	2005 JR_{60}	—	May 8, 2005	Socorro	LINEAR	·	2.3 km	MPC · JPL
117836	2005 JR_{61}	—	May 8, 2005	Siding Spring	SSS	·	2.5 km	MPC · JPL
117837	2005 JY_{67}	—	May 4, 2005	Palomar	NEAT	·	4.0 km	MPC · JPL
117838	2005 JY_{68}	—	May 6, 2005	Socorro	LINEAR	·	3.5 km	MPC · JPL
117839	2005 JD_{75}	—	May 8, 2005	Siding Spring	SSS	NYS	1.8 km	MPC · JPL
117840	2005 JW_{80}	—	May 11, 2005	Palomar	NEAT	·	3.7 km	MPC · JPL
117841	2005 JR_{98}	—	May 8, 2005	Anderson Mesa	LONEOS	·	1.9 km	MPC · JPL
117842	2005 JR_{109}	—	May 15, 2005	Reedy Creek	J. Broughton	·	1.5 km	MPC · JPL
117843	2005 JU_{123}	—	May 11, 2005	Palomar	NEAT	V	1.1 km	MPC · JPL
117844	2005 JR_{124}	—	May 11, 2005	Kitt Peak	Spacewatch	·	4.1 km	MPC · JPL
117845	2005 JT_{126}	—	May 12, 2005	Catalina	CSS	·	1.3 km	MPC · JPL
117846	2005 JU_{127}	—	May 12, 2005	Socorro	LINEAR	·	2.5 km	MPC · JPL
117847	2005 JK_{139}	—	May 13, 2005	Siding Spring	SSS	·	2.8 km	MPC · JPL
117848	2005 JJ_{146}	—	May 9, 2005	Catalina	CSS	MAR	1.9 km	MPC · JPL
117849	2005 JV_{146}	—	May 14, 2005	Kitt Peak	Spacewatch	·	2.0 km	MPC · JPL
117850	2005 JM_{150}	—	May 3, 2005	Kitt Peak	Spacewatch	·	2.6 km	MPC · JPL
117851	2005 JE_{151}	—	May 3, 2005	Catalina	CSS	L4	20 km	MPC · JPL
117852 Constance	2005 JG_{151}	Constance	May 3, 2005	Catalina	CSS	·	4.3 km	MPC · JPL
117853	2005 JH_{151}	—	May 3, 2005	Socorro	LINEAR	·	1.4 km	MPC · JPL
117854	2005 JE_{156}	—	May 4, 2005	Mount Lemmon	Mount Lemmon Survey	·	1.8 km	MPC · JPL
117855	2005 JO_{167}	—	May 12, 2005	Socorro	LINEAR	·	2.6 km	MPC · JPL
117856	2005 KD_{5}	—	May 18, 2005	Palomar	NEAT	·	2.6 km	MPC · JPL
117857	2005 KQ_{6}	—	May 19, 2005	Catalina	CSS	·	4.8 km	MPC · JPL
117858	2005 KQ_{9}	—	May 30, 2005	New Mexico Skies	Lowe, A.	·	3.4 km	MPC · JPL
117859	2005 KV_{9}	—	May 29, 2005	Reedy Creek	J. Broughton	·	2.0 km	MPC · JPL
117860	2005 LY	—	June 1, 2005	New Mexico Skies	Lowe, A.	·	2.5 km	MPC · JPL
117861	2005 LB_{2}	—	June 1, 2005	Kitt Peak	Spacewatch	EUN	2.0 km	MPC · JPL
117862	2005 LX_{12}	—	June 3, 2005	Catalina	CSS	·	1.1 km	MPC · JPL
117863	2028 P-L	—	September 24, 1960	Palomar	C. J. van Houten, I. van Houten-Groeneveld, T. Gehrels	·	2.7 km	MPC · JPL
117864	2069 P-L	—	September 24, 1960	Palomar	C. J. van Houten, I. van Houten-Groeneveld, T. Gehrels	·	4.0 km	MPC · JPL
117865	2081 P-L	—	September 24, 1960	Palomar	C. J. van Houten, I. van Houten-Groeneveld, T. Gehrels	(5)	2.1 km	MPC · JPL
117866	2105 P-L	—	September 24, 1960	Palomar	C. J. van Houten, I. van Houten-Groeneveld, T. Gehrels	·	1.6 km	MPC · JPL
117867	2127 P-L	—	September 24, 1960	Palomar	C. J. van Houten, I. van Houten-Groeneveld, T. Gehrels	·	3.7 km	MPC · JPL
117868	2147 P-L	—	September 24, 1960	Palomar	C. J. van Houten, I. van Houten-Groeneveld, T. Gehrels	·	2.2 km	MPC · JPL
117869	2168 P-L	—	September 26, 1960	Palomar	C. J. van Houten, I. van Houten-Groeneveld, T. Gehrels	(2076)	1.2 km	MPC · JPL
117870	2174 P-L	—	September 24, 1960	Palomar	C. J. van Houten, I. van Houten-Groeneveld, T. Gehrels	·	2.5 km	MPC · JPL
117871	2186 P-L	—	September 24, 1960	Palomar	C. J. van Houten, I. van Houten-Groeneveld, T. Gehrels	EUN	2.4 km	MPC · JPL
117872	2210 P-L	—	September 24, 1960	Palomar	C. J. van Houten, I. van Houten-Groeneveld, T. Gehrels	NYS	1.6 km	MPC · JPL
117873	2212 P-L	—	September 24, 1960	Palomar	C. J. van Houten, I. van Houten-Groeneveld, T. Gehrels	·	1.2 km	MPC · JPL
117874 Picodelteide	2511 P-L	Picodelteide	September 26, 1960	Palomar	C. J. van Houten, I. van Houten-Groeneveld, T. Gehrels	H	1.4 km	MPC · JPL
117875	2539 P-L	—	September 24, 1960	Palomar	C. J. van Houten, I. van Houten-Groeneveld, T. Gehrels	·	5.2 km	MPC · JPL
117876	2586 P-L	—	September 24, 1960	Palomar	C. J. van Houten, I. van Houten-Groeneveld, T. Gehrels	NYS ·	2.6 km	MPC · JPL
117877	2593 P-L	—	September 24, 1960	Palomar	C. J. van Houten, I. van Houten-Groeneveld, T. Gehrels	·	1.6 km	MPC · JPL
117878	2602 P-L	—	September 24, 1960	Palomar	C. J. van Houten, I. van Houten-Groeneveld, T. Gehrels	·	6.5 km	MPC · JPL
117879	2621 P-L	—	September 24, 1960	Palomar	C. J. van Houten, I. van Houten-Groeneveld, T. Gehrels	·	1.5 km	MPC · JPL
117880	2651 P-L	—	September 24, 1960	Palomar	C. J. van Houten, I. van Houten-Groeneveld, T. Gehrels	·	2.1 km	MPC · JPL
117881	2675 P-L	—	September 26, 1960	Palomar	C. J. van Houten, I. van Houten-Groeneveld, T. Gehrels	·	3.2 km	MPC · JPL
117882	2680 P-L	—	September 24, 1960	Palomar	C. J. van Houten, I. van Houten-Groeneveld, T. Gehrels	·	2.8 km	MPC · JPL
117883	2682 P-L	—	September 24, 1960	Palomar	C. J. van Houten, I. van Houten-Groeneveld, T. Gehrels	THM	4.4 km	MPC · JPL
117884	2684 P-L	—	September 24, 1960	Palomar	C. J. van Houten, I. van Houten-Groeneveld, T. Gehrels	·	2.3 km	MPC · JPL
117885	2692 P-L	—	September 24, 1960	Palomar	C. J. van Houten, I. van Houten-Groeneveld, T. Gehrels	·	6.1 km	MPC · JPL
117886	2694 P-L	—	September 24, 1960	Palomar	C. J. van Houten, I. van Houten-Groeneveld, T. Gehrels	·	2.0 km	MPC · JPL
117887	2721 P-L	—	September 24, 1960	Palomar	C. J. van Houten, I. van Houten-Groeneveld, T. Gehrels	KOR	2.3 km	MPC · JPL
117888	2735 P-L	—	September 24, 1960	Palomar	C. J. van Houten, I. van Houten-Groeneveld, T. Gehrels	NYS	1.4 km	MPC · JPL
117889	2745 P-L	—	September 24, 1960	Palomar	C. J. van Houten, I. van Houten-Groeneveld, T. Gehrels	·	1.4 km	MPC · JPL
117890	2748 P-L	—	September 24, 1960	Palomar	C. J. van Houten, I. van Houten-Groeneveld, T. Gehrels	·	2.5 km	MPC · JPL
117891	2750 P-L	—	September 24, 1960	Palomar	C. J. van Houten, I. van Houten-Groeneveld, T. Gehrels	·	1.2 km	MPC · JPL
117892	2753 P-L	—	September 24, 1960	Palomar	C. J. van Houten, I. van Houten-Groeneveld, T. Gehrels	·	2.5 km	MPC · JPL
117893	2781 P-L	—	September 26, 1960	Palomar	C. J. van Houten, I. van Houten-Groeneveld, T. Gehrels	·	2.5 km	MPC · JPL
117894	2791 P-L	—	September 26, 1960	Palomar	C. J. van Houten, I. van Houten-Groeneveld, T. Gehrels	·	2.6 km	MPC · JPL
117895	2802 P-L	—	September 24, 1960	Palomar	C. J. van Houten, I. van Houten-Groeneveld, T. Gehrels	JUN	1.5 km	MPC · JPL
117896	2815 P-L	—	September 24, 1960	Palomar	C. J. van Houten, I. van Houten-Groeneveld, T. Gehrels	NYS	2.1 km	MPC · JPL
117897	2845 P-L	—	September 24, 1960	Palomar	C. J. van Houten, I. van Houten-Groeneveld, T. Gehrels	·	3.7 km	MPC · JPL
117898	3029 P-L	—	September 24, 1960	Palomar	C. J. van Houten, I. van Houten-Groeneveld, T. Gehrels	·	1.3 km	MPC · JPL
117899	3048 P-L	—	September 24, 1960	Palomar	C. J. van Houten, I. van Houten-Groeneveld, T. Gehrels	TIR ·	6.2 km	MPC · JPL
117900	3053 P-L	—	September 24, 1960	Palomar	C. J. van Houten, I. van Houten-Groeneveld, T. Gehrels	·	1.9 km	MPC · JPL

== 117901–118000 ==
back to top

Designation			Discovery			Properties		Ref
Permanent	Provisional	Named after	Date	Site	Discoverer(s)	Category	Diam.	Ref
117901	3055 P-L	—	September 24, 1960	Palomar	C. J. van Houten, I. van Houten-Groeneveld, T. Gehrels	BAR	2.6 km	MPC · JPL
117902	3058 P-L	—	September 25, 1960	Palomar	C. J. van Houten, I. van Houten-Groeneveld, T. Gehrels	(32418) ·	3.4 km	MPC · JPL
117903	3115 P-L	—	September 24, 1960	Palomar	C. J. van Houten, I. van Houten-Groeneveld, T. Gehrels	·	3.5 km	MPC · JPL
117904	3504 P-L	—	October 17, 1960	Palomar	C. J. van Houten, I. van Houten-Groeneveld, T. Gehrels	·	4.3 km	MPC · JPL
117905	3543 P-L	—	October 17, 1960	Palomar	C. J. van Houten, I. van Houten-Groeneveld, T. Gehrels	EUN	2.8 km	MPC · JPL
117906	4046 P-L	—	September 24, 1960	Palomar	C. J. van Houten, I. van Houten-Groeneveld, T. Gehrels	ERI	2.8 km	MPC · JPL
117907	4076 P-L	—	September 24, 1960	Palomar	C. J. van Houten, I. van Houten-Groeneveld, T. Gehrels	NAE	6.6 km	MPC · JPL
117908	4104 P-L	—	September 24, 1960	Palomar	C. J. van Houten, I. van Houten-Groeneveld, T. Gehrels	V	1.4 km	MPC · JPL
117909	4123 P-L	—	September 24, 1960	Palomar	C. J. van Houten, I. van Houten-Groeneveld, T. Gehrels	·	3.5 km	MPC · JPL
117910	4130 P-L	—	September 24, 1960	Palomar	C. J. van Houten, I. van Houten-Groeneveld, T. Gehrels	·	3.4 km	MPC · JPL
117911	4138 P-L	—	September 24, 1960	Palomar	C. J. van Houten, I. van Houten-Groeneveld, T. Gehrels	·	1.4 km	MPC · JPL
117912	4171 P-L	—	September 24, 1960	Palomar	C. J. van Houten, I. van Houten-Groeneveld, T. Gehrels	·	1.3 km	MPC · JPL
117913	4211 P-L	—	September 24, 1960	Palomar	C. J. van Houten, I. van Houten-Groeneveld, T. Gehrels	(5)	2.1 km	MPC · JPL
117914	4225 P-L	—	September 24, 1960	Palomar	C. J. van Houten, I. van Houten-Groeneveld, T. Gehrels	·	4.6 km	MPC · JPL
117915	4227 P-L	—	September 24, 1960	Palomar	C. J. van Houten, I. van Houten-Groeneveld, T. Gehrels	·	960 m	MPC · JPL
117916	4271 P-L	—	September 24, 1960	Palomar	C. J. van Houten, I. van Houten-Groeneveld, T. Gehrels	·	3.7 km	MPC · JPL
117917	4281 P-L	—	September 24, 1960	Palomar	C. J. van Houten, I. van Houten-Groeneveld, T. Gehrels	·	4.3 km	MPC · JPL
117918	4320 P-L	—	September 24, 1960	Palomar	C. J. van Houten, I. van Houten-Groeneveld, T. Gehrels	·	5.8 km	MPC · JPL
117919	4537 P-L	—	September 24, 1960	Palomar	C. J. van Houten, I. van Houten-Groeneveld, T. Gehrels	·	1.8 km	MPC · JPL
117920	4546 P-L	—	September 24, 1960	Palomar	C. J. van Houten, I. van Houten-Groeneveld, T. Gehrels	·	1.9 km	MPC · JPL
117921	4621 P-L	—	September 24, 1960	Palomar	C. J. van Houten, I. van Houten-Groeneveld, T. Gehrels	MAS	1.3 km	MPC · JPL
117922	4622 P-L	—	September 24, 1960	Palomar	C. J. van Houten, I. van Houten-Groeneveld, T. Gehrels	EUN	2.5 km	MPC · JPL
117923	4660 P-L	—	September 24, 1960	Palomar	C. J. van Houten, I. van Houten-Groeneveld, T. Gehrels	·	3.2 km	MPC · JPL
117924	4699 P-L	—	September 24, 1960	Palomar	C. J. van Houten, I. van Houten-Groeneveld, T. Gehrels	·	1.2 km	MPC · JPL
117925	4701 P-L	—	September 24, 1960	Palomar	C. J. van Houten, I. van Houten-Groeneveld, T. Gehrels	·	2.0 km	MPC · JPL
117926	4703 P-L	—	September 24, 1960	Palomar	C. J. van Houten, I. van Houten-Groeneveld, T. Gehrels	·	6.5 km	MPC · JPL
117927	4739 P-L	—	September 24, 1960	Palomar	C. J. van Houten, I. van Houten-Groeneveld, T. Gehrels	·	2.0 km	MPC · JPL
117928	4741 P-L	—	September 24, 1960	Palomar	C. J. van Houten, I. van Houten-Groeneveld, T. Gehrels	·	2.5 km	MPC · JPL
117929	4742 P-L	—	September 24, 1960	Palomar	C. J. van Houten, I. van Houten-Groeneveld, T. Gehrels	NYS ·	2.9 km	MPC · JPL
117930	4747 P-L	—	September 24, 1960	Palomar	C. J. van Houten, I. van Houten-Groeneveld, T. Gehrels	V	990 m	MPC · JPL
117931	4776 P-L	—	September 24, 1960	Palomar	C. J. van Houten, I. van Houten-Groeneveld, T. Gehrels	THM	4.4 km	MPC · JPL
117932	4781 P-L	—	September 24, 1960	Palomar	C. J. van Houten, I. van Houten-Groeneveld, T. Gehrels	MRX	1.9 km	MPC · JPL
117933	4808 P-L	—	September 24, 1960	Palomar	C. J. van Houten, I. van Houten-Groeneveld, T. Gehrels	·	1.4 km	MPC · JPL
117934	4809 P-L	—	September 24, 1960	Palomar	C. J. van Houten, I. van Houten-Groeneveld, T. Gehrels	·	2.3 km	MPC · JPL
117935	4863 P-L	—	September 24, 1960	Palomar	C. J. van Houten, I. van Houten-Groeneveld, T. Gehrels	·	4.7 km	MPC · JPL
117936	4899 P-L	—	September 24, 1960	Palomar	C. J. van Houten, I. van Houten-Groeneveld, T. Gehrels	·	2.2 km	MPC · JPL
117937	5036 P-L	—	October 22, 1960	Palomar	C. J. van Houten, I. van Houten-Groeneveld, T. Gehrels	(5)	2.0 km	MPC · JPL
117938	6101 P-L	—	September 24, 1960	Palomar	C. J. van Houten, I. van Houten-Groeneveld, T. Gehrels	·	3.7 km	MPC · JPL
117939	6122 P-L	—	September 24, 1960	Palomar	C. J. van Houten, I. van Houten-Groeneveld, T. Gehrels	·	2.8 km	MPC · JPL
117940	6191 P-L	—	September 24, 1960	Palomar	C. J. van Houten, I. van Houten-Groeneveld, T. Gehrels	·	4.9 km	MPC · JPL
117941	6202 P-L	—	September 24, 1960	Palomar	C. J. van Houten, I. van Houten-Groeneveld, T. Gehrels	HYG	4.8 km	MPC · JPL
117942	6210 P-L	—	September 24, 1960	Palomar	C. J. van Houten, I. van Houten-Groeneveld, T. Gehrels	NYS	1.3 km	MPC · JPL
117943	6219 P-L	—	September 24, 1960	Palomar	C. J. van Houten, I. van Houten-Groeneveld, T. Gehrels	NYS	1.4 km	MPC · JPL
117944	6257 P-L	—	September 24, 1960	Palomar	C. J. van Houten, I. van Houten-Groeneveld, T. Gehrels	(5)	1.7 km	MPC · JPL
117945	6271 P-L	—	September 24, 1960	Palomar	C. J. van Houten, I. van Houten-Groeneveld, T. Gehrels	CYB	6.5 km	MPC · JPL
117946	6276 P-L	—	September 24, 1960	Palomar	C. J. van Houten, I. van Houten-Groeneveld, T. Gehrels	·	4.2 km	MPC · JPL
117947	6301 P-L	—	September 24, 1960	Palomar	C. J. van Houten, I. van Houten-Groeneveld, T. Gehrels	NYS	1.9 km	MPC · JPL
117948	6315 P-L	—	September 24, 1960	Palomar	C. J. van Houten, I. van Houten-Groeneveld, T. Gehrels	·	4.9 km	MPC · JPL
117949	6316 P-L	—	September 24, 1960	Palomar	C. J. van Houten, I. van Houten-Groeneveld, T. Gehrels	·	2.3 km	MPC · JPL
117950	6337 P-L	—	September 24, 1960	Palomar	C. J. van Houten, I. van Houten-Groeneveld, T. Gehrels	·	3.3 km	MPC · JPL
117951	6369 P-L	—	September 24, 1960	Palomar	C. J. van Houten, I. van Houten-Groeneveld, T. Gehrels	·	6.2 km	MPC · JPL
117952	6376 P-L	—	September 24, 1960	Palomar	C. J. van Houten, I. van Houten-Groeneveld, T. Gehrels	·	2.5 km	MPC · JPL
117953	6511 P-L	—	September 24, 1960	Palomar	C. J. van Houten, I. van Houten-Groeneveld, T. Gehrels	·	2.0 km	MPC · JPL
117954	6686 P-L	—	September 24, 1960	Palomar	C. J. van Houten, I. van Houten-Groeneveld, T. Gehrels	·	1.3 km	MPC · JPL
117955	6693 P-L	—	September 24, 1960	Palomar	C. J. van Houten, I. van Houten-Groeneveld, T. Gehrels	·	1.7 km	MPC · JPL
117956	6695 P-L	—	September 24, 1960	Palomar	C. J. van Houten, I. van Houten-Groeneveld, T. Gehrels	HYG	4.8 km	MPC · JPL
117957	6706 P-L	—	September 24, 1960	Palomar	C. J. van Houten, I. van Houten-Groeneveld, T. Gehrels	·	2.2 km	MPC · JPL
117958	6732 P-L	—	September 24, 1960	Palomar	C. J. van Houten, I. van Houten-Groeneveld, T. Gehrels	·	2.1 km	MPC · JPL
117959	6763 P-L	—	September 26, 1960	Palomar	C. J. van Houten, I. van Houten-Groeneveld, T. Gehrels	·	1.5 km	MPC · JPL
117960	6784 P-L	—	September 24, 1960	Palomar	C. J. van Houten, I. van Houten-Groeneveld, T. Gehrels	EOS	5.0 km	MPC · JPL
117961	6813 P-L	—	September 24, 1960	Palomar	C. J. van Houten, I. van Houten-Groeneveld, T. Gehrels	AGN	2.3 km	MPC · JPL
117962	6854 P-L	—	September 24, 1960	Palomar	C. J. van Houten, I. van Houten-Groeneveld, T. Gehrels	·	1.2 km	MPC · JPL
117963	7596 P-L	—	October 17, 1960	Palomar	C. J. van Houten, I. van Houten-Groeneveld, T. Gehrels	·	1.7 km	MPC · JPL
117964	7619 P-L	—	October 17, 1960	Palomar	C. J. van Houten, I. van Houten-Groeneveld, T. Gehrels	·	1.3 km	MPC · JPL
117965	9064 P-L	—	October 17, 1960	Palomar	C. J. van Houten, I. van Houten-Groeneveld, T. Gehrels	·	1.7 km	MPC · JPL
117966	9524 P-L	—	October 17, 1960	Palomar	C. J. van Houten, I. van Houten-Groeneveld, T. Gehrels	·	2.1 km	MPC · JPL
117967	9563 P-L	—	October 17, 1960	Palomar	C. J. van Houten, I. van Houten-Groeneveld, T. Gehrels	NYS ·	2.2 km	MPC · JPL
117968	9564 P-L	—	October 17, 1960	Palomar	C. J. van Houten, I. van Houten-Groeneveld, T. Gehrels	NYS	1.9 km	MPC · JPL
117969	9583 P-L	—	October 17, 1960	Palomar	C. J. van Houten, I. van Houten-Groeneveld, T. Gehrels	·	2.8 km	MPC · JPL
117970	9590 P-L	—	September 24, 1960	Palomar	C. J. van Houten, I. van Houten-Groeneveld, T. Gehrels	·	4.7 km	MPC · JPL
117971	9613 P-L	—	October 17, 1960	Palomar	C. J. van Houten, I. van Houten-Groeneveld, T. Gehrels	·	4.2 km	MPC · JPL
117972	1055 T-1	—	March 25, 1971	Palomar	C. J. van Houten, I. van Houten-Groeneveld, T. Gehrels	·	2.9 km	MPC · JPL
117973	1073 T-1	—	March 25, 1971	Palomar	C. J. van Houten, I. van Houten-Groeneveld, T. Gehrels	·	1.4 km	MPC · JPL
117974	1077 T-1	—	March 25, 1971	Palomar	C. J. van Houten, I. van Houten-Groeneveld, T. Gehrels	·	4.5 km	MPC · JPL
117975	1131 T-1	—	March 25, 1971	Palomar	C. J. van Houten, I. van Houten-Groeneveld, T. Gehrels	·	1.3 km	MPC · JPL
117976	1158 T-1	—	March 25, 1971	Palomar	C. J. van Houten, I. van Houten-Groeneveld, T. Gehrels	·	2.9 km	MPC · JPL
117977	1192 T-1	—	March 25, 1971	Palomar	C. J. van Houten, I. van Houten-Groeneveld, T. Gehrels	JUN	1.5 km	MPC · JPL
117978	1215 T-1	—	March 25, 1971	Palomar	C. J. van Houten, I. van Houten-Groeneveld, T. Gehrels	·	2.9 km	MPC · JPL
117979	1233 T-1	—	March 25, 1971	Palomar	C. J. van Houten, I. van Houten-Groeneveld, T. Gehrels	·	2.8 km	MPC · JPL
117980	1256 T-1	—	March 25, 1971	Palomar	C. J. van Houten, I. van Houten-Groeneveld, T. Gehrels	·	1.4 km	MPC · JPL
117981	2067 T-1	—	March 25, 1971	Palomar	C. J. van Houten, I. van Houten-Groeneveld, T. Gehrels	·	3.4 km	MPC · JPL
117982	2134 T-1	—	March 25, 1971	Palomar	C. J. van Houten, I. van Houten-Groeneveld, T. Gehrels	SUL	3.6 km	MPC · JPL
117983	2240 T-1	—	March 25, 1971	Palomar	C. J. van Houten, I. van Houten-Groeneveld, T. Gehrels	·	2.0 km	MPC · JPL
117984	2283 T-1	—	March 25, 1971	Palomar	C. J. van Houten, I. van Houten-Groeneveld, T. Gehrels	·	1.7 km	MPC · JPL
117985	3167 T-1	—	March 26, 1971	Palomar	C. J. van Houten, I. van Houten-Groeneveld, T. Gehrels	·	880 m	MPC · JPL
117986	3176 T-1	—	March 26, 1971	Palomar	C. J. van Houten, I. van Houten-Groeneveld, T. Gehrels	·	2.4 km	MPC · JPL
117987	4106 T-1	—	March 26, 1971	Palomar	C. J. van Houten, I. van Houten-Groeneveld, T. Gehrels	·	4.6 km	MPC · JPL
117988	4300 T-1	—	March 26, 1971	Palomar	C. J. van Houten, I. van Houten-Groeneveld, T. Gehrels	NYS	2.2 km	MPC · JPL
117989	4371 T-1	—	March 26, 1971	Palomar	C. J. van Houten, I. van Houten-Groeneveld, T. Gehrels	·	1.6 km	MPC · JPL
117990	1014 T-2	—	September 29, 1973	Palomar	C. J. van Houten, I. van Houten-Groeneveld, T. Gehrels	·	4.6 km	MPC · JPL
117991	1033 T-2	—	September 29, 1973	Palomar	C. J. van Houten, I. van Houten-Groeneveld, T. Gehrels	GEF	2.3 km	MPC · JPL
117992	1039 T-2	—	September 29, 1973	Palomar	C. J. van Houten, I. van Houten-Groeneveld, T. Gehrels	·	3.1 km	MPC · JPL
117993 Zambujal	1064 T-2	Zambujal	September 29, 1973	Palomar	C. J. van Houten, I. van Houten-Groeneveld, T. Gehrels	T_{j} (2.99) · 3:2	11 km	MPC · JPL
117994	1076 T-2	—	September 29, 1973	Palomar	C. J. van Houten, I. van Houten-Groeneveld, T. Gehrels	·	2.6 km	MPC · JPL
117995	1086 T-2	—	September 29, 1973	Palomar	C. J. van Houten, I. van Houten-Groeneveld, T. Gehrels	NYS	2.5 km	MPC · JPL
117996	1089 T-2	—	September 29, 1973	Palomar	C. J. van Houten, I. van Houten-Groeneveld, T. Gehrels	·	6.5 km	MPC · JPL
117997 Irazú	1090 T-2	Irazú	September 29, 1973	Palomar	C. J. van Houten, I. van Houten-Groeneveld, T. Gehrels	H	1.1 km	MPC · JPL
117998	1095 T-2	—	September 29, 1973	Palomar	C. J. van Houten, I. van Houten-Groeneveld, T. Gehrels	·	2.3 km	MPC · JPL
117999	1113 T-2	—	September 29, 1973	Palomar	C. J. van Houten, I. van Houten-Groeneveld, T. Gehrels	NYS	1.5 km	MPC · JPL
118000	1128 T-2	—	September 29, 1973	Palomar	C. J. van Houten, I. van Houten-Groeneveld, T. Gehrels	·	940 m	MPC · JPL

back to top

== See also ==
- Meanings of minor-planet names: 117001–118000
