= List of minor planets: 116001–117000 =

The following is a partial list of minor planets, running from minor-planet number 116001 through 117000, inclusive. The primary data for this and other partial lists is based on JPL's "Small-Body Orbital Elements" and data available from the Minor Planet Center. Critical list information is also provided by the MPC, unless otherwise specified from Lowell Observatory. A detailed description of the table's columns and additional sources are given on the main page including a complete list of every page in this series, and a statistical break-up on the dynamical classification of minor planets.

Also see the summary list of all named bodies in numerical and alphabetical order, and the corresponding naming citations for the number range of this particular list. New namings may only be added to this list after official publication, as the preannouncement of names is condemned by the Working Group for Small Bodies Nomenclature of the International Astronomical Union.

Near-Earth obj.	MBA (inner)	MBA (outer)	Centaur
Mars-crosser	MBA (middle)	Jupiter trojan	Trans-Neptunian obj.
Unclassified

== 116001–116100 ==
Designation			Discovery			Properties		Ref
Permanent	Provisional	Named after	Date	Site	Discoverer(s)	Category	Diam.	Ref
116001	2003 WD_{74}	—	November 20, 2003	Socorro	LINEAR	HOF	4.9 km	MPC · JPL
116002	2003 WH_{75}	—	November 18, 2003	Kitt Peak	Spacewatch	·	1.6 km	MPC · JPL
116003	2003 WN_{75}	—	November 19, 2003	Kitt Peak	Spacewatch	·	3.9 km	MPC · JPL
116004	2003 WB_{76}	—	November 19, 2003	Socorro	LINEAR	VER	6.2 km	MPC · JPL
116005	2003 WL_{77}	—	November 19, 2003	Kitt Peak	Spacewatch	·	4.0 km	MPC · JPL
116006	2003 WA_{78}	—	November 20, 2003	Kitt Peak	Spacewatch	·	7.0 km	MPC · JPL
116007	2003 WJ_{78}	—	November 20, 2003	Socorro	LINEAR	·	2.9 km	MPC · JPL
116008	2003 WE_{79}	—	November 20, 2003	Socorro	LINEAR	·	6.8 km	MPC · JPL
116009	2003 WT_{79}	—	November 20, 2003	Socorro	LINEAR	·	4.8 km	MPC · JPL
116010	2003 WP_{80}	—	November 20, 2003	Socorro	LINEAR	·	4.1 km	MPC · JPL
116011	2003 WQ_{80}	—	November 20, 2003	Catalina	CSS	·	2.6 km	MPC · JPL
116012	2003 WU_{81}	—	November 18, 2003	Palomar	NEAT	·	5.4 km	MPC · JPL
116013	2003 WU_{82}	—	November 19, 2003	Palomar	NEAT	·	4.4 km	MPC · JPL
116014	2003 WA_{83}	—	November 20, 2003	Socorro	LINEAR	·	3.1 km	MPC · JPL
116015	2003 WE_{83}	—	November 20, 2003	Palomar	NEAT	EUN	2.5 km	MPC · JPL
116016	2003 WK_{83}	—	November 20, 2003	Socorro	LINEAR	·	5.9 km	MPC · JPL
116017	2003 WN_{84}	—	November 19, 2003	Palomar	NEAT	615	3.9 km	MPC · JPL
116018	2003 WS_{84}	—	November 19, 2003	Catalina	CSS	·	4.5 km	MPC · JPL
116019	2003 WT_{84}	—	November 19, 2003	Catalina	CSS	·	4.4 km	MPC · JPL
116020	2003 WC_{86}	—	November 20, 2003	Socorro	LINEAR	·	6.5 km	MPC · JPL
116021	2003 WG_{86}	—	November 21, 2003	Palomar	NEAT	·	7.4 km	MPC · JPL
116022	2003 WM_{87}	—	November 21, 2003	Socorro	LINEAR	·	5.3 km	MPC · JPL
116023	2003 WN_{87}	—	November 21, 2003	Socorro	LINEAR	·	2.1 km	MPC · JPL
116024	2003 WR_{87}	—	November 22, 2003	Catalina	CSS	·	4.1 km	MPC · JPL
116025	2003 WS_{87}	—	November 22, 2003	Socorro	LINEAR	·	3.4 km	MPC · JPL
116026	2003 WP_{88}	—	November 16, 2003	Kitt Peak	Spacewatch	·	1.7 km	MPC · JPL
116027	2003 WV_{88}	—	November 16, 2003	Catalina	CSS	MAS	1.1 km	MPC · JPL
116028	2003 WJ_{89}	—	November 16, 2003	Catalina	CSS	·	4.3 km	MPC · JPL
116029	2003 WO_{89}	—	November 16, 2003	Catalina	CSS	V	940 m	MPC · JPL
116030	2003 WY_{90}	—	November 18, 2003	Kitt Peak	Spacewatch	·	3.3 km	MPC · JPL
116031	2003 WR_{91}	—	November 18, 2003	Kitt Peak	Spacewatch	·	7.4 km	MPC · JPL
116032	2003 WQ_{92}	—	November 19, 2003	Anderson Mesa	LONEOS	·	2.7 km	MPC · JPL
116033	2003 WY_{92}	—	November 19, 2003	Anderson Mesa	LONEOS	V	1.4 km	MPC · JPL
116034	2003 WH_{95}	—	November 19, 2003	Anderson Mesa	LONEOS	MAS	1.8 km	MPC · JPL
116035	2003 WN_{96}	—	November 19, 2003	Anderson Mesa	LONEOS	·	6.9 km	MPC · JPL
116036	2003 WX_{97}	—	November 19, 2003	Anderson Mesa	LONEOS	·	9.2 km	MPC · JPL
116037	2003 WU_{99}	—	November 20, 2003	Socorro	LINEAR	EUN ·	4.2 km	MPC · JPL
116038	2003 WY_{99}	—	November 20, 2003	Socorro	LINEAR	V	1.1 km	MPC · JPL
116039	2003 WZ_{99}	—	November 20, 2003	Socorro	LINEAR	AGN	2.2 km	MPC · JPL
116040	2003 WQ_{100}	—	November 21, 2003	Palomar	NEAT	·	9.9 km	MPC · JPL
116041	2003 WZ_{100}	—	November 21, 2003	Catalina	CSS	·	4.3 km	MPC · JPL
116042	2003 WA_{101}	—	November 21, 2003	Catalina	CSS	·	6.4 km	MPC · JPL
116043	2003 WW_{101}	—	November 21, 2003	Socorro	LINEAR	·	1.8 km	MPC · JPL
116044	2003 WE_{102}	—	November 21, 2003	Socorro	LINEAR	·	4.3 km	MPC · JPL
116045	2003 WR_{102}	—	November 21, 2003	Socorro	LINEAR	·	7.9 km	MPC · JPL
116046	2003 WZ_{102}	—	November 21, 2003	Socorro	LINEAR	PHO	2.8 km	MPC · JPL
116047	2003 WR_{104}	—	November 21, 2003	Socorro	LINEAR	·	4.2 km	MPC · JPL
116048	2003 WC_{105}	—	November 21, 2003	Socorro	LINEAR	·	4.7 km	MPC · JPL
116049	2003 WE_{105}	—	November 21, 2003	Kitt Peak	Spacewatch	·	2.5 km	MPC · JPL
116050	2003 WL_{105}	—	November 21, 2003	Socorro	LINEAR	·	7.1 km	MPC · JPL
116051	2003 WM_{106}	—	November 21, 2003	Socorro	LINEAR	WAT	4.2 km	MPC · JPL
116052	2003 WT_{106}	—	November 21, 2003	Palomar	NEAT	TIR	4.7 km	MPC · JPL
116053	2003 WD_{107}	—	November 22, 2003	Socorro	LINEAR	HNS	2.8 km	MPC · JPL
116054	2003 WO_{107}	—	November 23, 2003	Socorro	LINEAR	·	3.1 km	MPC · JPL
116055	2003 WQ_{107}	—	November 23, 2003	Catalina	CSS	MAR	3.7 km	MPC · JPL
116056	2003 WS_{107}	—	November 23, 2003	Catalina	CSS	·	3.9 km	MPC · JPL
116057	2003 WW_{107}	—	November 24, 2003	Catalina	CSS	BAR	4.0 km	MPC · JPL
116058	2003 WB_{108}	—	November 20, 2003	Socorro	LINEAR	V	1.1 km	MPC · JPL
116059	2003 WG_{110}	—	November 20, 2003	Socorro	LINEAR	·	4.9 km	MPC · JPL
116060	2003 WL_{111}	—	November 20, 2003	Socorro	LINEAR	·	3.0 km	MPC · JPL
116061	2003 WO_{111}	—	November 20, 2003	Socorro	LINEAR	·	1.1 km	MPC · JPL
116062	2003 WN_{115}	—	November 20, 2003	Socorro	LINEAR	HYG	5.2 km	MPC · JPL
116063	2003 WM_{117}	—	November 20, 2003	Socorro	LINEAR	·	5.1 km	MPC · JPL
116064	2003 WA_{118}	—	November 20, 2003	Socorro	LINEAR	·	2.9 km	MPC · JPL
116065	2003 WX_{118}	—	November 20, 2003	Socorro	LINEAR	NEM	3.9 km	MPC · JPL
116066	2003 WC_{119}	—	November 20, 2003	Socorro	LINEAR	EOS	4.0 km	MPC · JPL
116067	2003 WF_{119}	—	November 20, 2003	Socorro	LINEAR	(2076)	1.5 km	MPC · JPL
116068	2003 WW_{119}	—	November 20, 2003	Socorro	LINEAR	·	5.4 km	MPC · JPL
116069	2003 WR_{120}	—	November 20, 2003	Socorro	LINEAR	EOS	4.5 km	MPC · JPL
116070	2003 WV_{120}	—	November 20, 2003	Socorro	LINEAR	MAR	2.2 km	MPC · JPL
116071	2003 WB_{121}	—	November 20, 2003	Socorro	LINEAR	·	1.7 km	MPC · JPL
116072	2003 WG_{121}	—	November 20, 2003	Socorro	LINEAR	·	1.6 km	MPC · JPL
116073	2003 WH_{121}	—	November 20, 2003	Socorro	LINEAR	·	2.7 km	MPC · JPL
116074	2003 WK_{121}	—	November 20, 2003	Socorro	LINEAR	·	2.7 km	MPC · JPL
116075	2003 WX_{121}	—	November 20, 2003	Socorro	LINEAR	·	1.6 km	MPC · JPL
116076	2003 WL_{123}	—	November 20, 2003	Socorro	LINEAR	·	2.3 km	MPC · JPL
116077	2003 WT_{123}	—	November 20, 2003	Socorro	LINEAR	·	4.0 km	MPC · JPL
116078	2003 WV_{123}	—	November 20, 2003	Socorro	LINEAR	(5)	2.4 km	MPC · JPL
116079	2003 WA_{124}	—	November 20, 2003	Socorro	LINEAR	·	3.2 km	MPC · JPL
116080	2003 WG_{124}	—	November 20, 2003	Socorro	LINEAR	·	6.2 km	MPC · JPL
116081	2003 WM_{124}	—	November 20, 2003	Socorro	LINEAR	·	2.9 km	MPC · JPL
116082	2003 WZ_{124}	—	November 20, 2003	Socorro	LINEAR	·	3.0 km	MPC · JPL
116083	2003 WA_{125}	—	November 20, 2003	Socorro	LINEAR	·	4.4 km	MPC · JPL
116084	2003 WB_{125}	—	November 20, 2003	Socorro	LINEAR	·	2.3 km	MPC · JPL
116085	2003 WK_{125}	—	November 20, 2003	Socorro	LINEAR	·	3.7 km	MPC · JPL
116086	2003 WU_{125}	—	November 20, 2003	Socorro	LINEAR	EOS	4.1 km	MPC · JPL
116087	2003 WX_{125}	—	November 20, 2003	Socorro	LINEAR	T_{j} (2.99)	8.9 km	MPC · JPL
116088	2003 WY_{125}	—	November 20, 2003	Socorro	LINEAR	·	2.3 km	MPC · JPL
116089	2003 WA_{126}	—	November 20, 2003	Socorro	LINEAR	ADE	6.9 km	MPC · JPL
116090	2003 WC_{126}	—	November 20, 2003	Socorro	LINEAR	·	7.9 km	MPC · JPL
116091	2003 WG_{126}	—	November 20, 2003	Socorro	LINEAR	·	4.5 km	MPC · JPL
116092	2003 WJ_{126}	—	November 20, 2003	Socorro	LINEAR	·	3.3 km	MPC · JPL
116093	2003 WK_{126}	—	November 20, 2003	Socorro	LINEAR	·	3.1 km	MPC · JPL
116094	2003 WZ_{126}	—	November 20, 2003	Socorro	LINEAR	·	7.0 km	MPC · JPL
116095	2003 WD_{127}	—	November 20, 2003	Socorro	LINEAR	MIS	6.3 km	MPC · JPL
116096	2003 WE_{127}	—	November 20, 2003	Socorro	LINEAR	HYG	7.0 km	MPC · JPL
116097	2003 WH_{127}	—	November 20, 2003	Socorro	LINEAR	·	3.7 km	MPC · JPL
116098	2003 WU_{127}	—	November 20, 2003	Socorro	LINEAR	·	7.0 km	MPC · JPL
116099	2003 WY_{127}	—	November 20, 2003	Socorro	LINEAR	·	4.2 km	MPC · JPL
116100	2003 WB_{128}	—	November 20, 2003	Socorro	LINEAR	·	6.7 km	MPC · JPL

== 116101–116200 ==
back to top

Designation			Discovery			Properties		Ref
Permanent	Provisional	Named after	Date	Site	Discoverer(s)	Category	Diam.	Ref
116101	2003 WM_{131}	—	November 21, 2003	Palomar	NEAT	·	1.2 km	MPC · JPL
116102	2003 WL_{132}	—	November 19, 2003	Kitt Peak	Spacewatch	·	1.3 km	MPC · JPL
116103	2003 WT_{132}	—	November 21, 2003	Socorro	LINEAR	·	2.5 km	MPC · JPL
116104	2003 WB_{133}	—	November 21, 2003	Socorro	LINEAR	·	2.5 km	MPC · JPL
116105	2003 WZ_{133}	—	November 21, 2003	Socorro	LINEAR	·	1.5 km	MPC · JPL
116106	2003 WC_{134}	—	November 21, 2003	Socorro	LINEAR	V	1.4 km	MPC · JPL
116107	2003 WE_{134}	—	November 21, 2003	Socorro	LINEAR	·	1.4 km	MPC · JPL
116108	2003 WR_{134}	—	November 21, 2003	Socorro	LINEAR	·	5.5 km	MPC · JPL
116109	2003 WT_{134}	—	November 21, 2003	Socorro	LINEAR	·	1.3 km	MPC · JPL
116110	2003 WV_{134}	—	November 21, 2003	Socorro	LINEAR	·	2.1 km	MPC · JPL
116111	2003 WD_{135}	—	November 21, 2003	Socorro	LINEAR	·	6.7 km	MPC · JPL
116112	2003 WH_{135}	—	November 21, 2003	Socorro	LINEAR	·	4.0 km	MPC · JPL
116113	2003 WW_{135}	—	November 21, 2003	Socorro	LINEAR	·	3.7 km	MPC · JPL
116114	2003 WZ_{135}	—	November 21, 2003	Socorro	LINEAR	AGN	2.4 km	MPC · JPL
116115	2003 WL_{136}	—	November 21, 2003	Socorro	LINEAR	·	8.8 km	MPC · JPL
116116	2003 WY_{136}	—	November 21, 2003	Socorro	LINEAR	EOS	5.4 km	MPC · JPL
116117	2003 WG_{137}	—	November 21, 2003	Socorro	LINEAR	EOS	4.7 km	MPC · JPL
116118	2003 WH_{137}	—	November 21, 2003	Socorro	LINEAR	THM	4.6 km	MPC · JPL
116119	2003 WU_{137}	—	November 21, 2003	Socorro	LINEAR	V	1.3 km	MPC · JPL
116120	2003 WP_{138}	—	November 21, 2003	Socorro	LINEAR	(5)	2.8 km	MPC · JPL
116121	2003 WU_{138}	—	November 21, 2003	Socorro	LINEAR	·	2.9 km	MPC · JPL
116122	2003 WD_{139}	—	November 21, 2003	Socorro	LINEAR	NYS	2.2 km	MPC · JPL
116123	2003 WL_{139}	—	November 21, 2003	Socorro	LINEAR	·	2.0 km	MPC · JPL
116124	2003 WU_{139}	—	November 21, 2003	Socorro	LINEAR	·	5.1 km	MPC · JPL
116125	2003 WY_{139}	—	November 21, 2003	Socorro	LINEAR	EUN	3.0 km	MPC · JPL
116126	2003 WA_{140}	—	November 21, 2003	Socorro	LINEAR	·	2.3 km	MPC · JPL
116127	2003 WL_{140}	—	November 21, 2003	Socorro	LINEAR	·	1.9 km	MPC · JPL
116128	2003 WN_{140}	—	November 21, 2003	Socorro	LINEAR	·	4.0 km	MPC · JPL
116129	2003 WO_{140}	—	November 21, 2003	Socorro	LINEAR	·	3.0 km	MPC · JPL
116130	2003 WB_{141}	—	November 21, 2003	Socorro	LINEAR	NAE	7.0 km	MPC · JPL
116131	2003 WS_{141}	—	November 21, 2003	Socorro	LINEAR	ADE	6.6 km	MPC · JPL
116132	2003 WA_{142}	—	November 21, 2003	Socorro	LINEAR	·	7.0 km	MPC · JPL
116133	2003 WO_{142}	—	November 21, 2003	Socorro	LINEAR	PHO	2.5 km	MPC · JPL
116134	2003 WZ_{142}	—	November 23, 2003	Socorro	LINEAR	L5	15 km	MPC · JPL
116135	2003 WC_{144}	—	November 21, 2003	Socorro	LINEAR	MAS	1.0 km	MPC · JPL
116136	2003 WH_{144}	—	November 21, 2003	Socorro	LINEAR	·	2.1 km	MPC · JPL
116137	2003 WC_{145}	—	November 21, 2003	Socorro	LINEAR	·	6.4 km	MPC · JPL
116138	2003 WK_{145}	—	November 21, 2003	Socorro	LINEAR	AST	3.9 km	MPC · JPL
116139	2003 WA_{146}	—	November 21, 2003	Socorro	LINEAR	TIR	3.6 km	MPC · JPL
116140	2003 WP_{146}	—	November 23, 2003	Catalina	CSS	·	7.4 km	MPC · JPL
116141	2003 WA_{149}	—	November 24, 2003	Socorro	LINEAR	V	1.1 km	MPC · JPL
116142	2003 WA_{150}	—	November 24, 2003	Anderson Mesa	LONEOS	V	1.2 km	MPC · JPL
116143	2003 WO_{152}	—	November 25, 2003	Kingsnake	J. V. McClusky	·	2.5 km	MPC · JPL
116144	2003 WM_{153}	—	November 26, 2003	Anderson Mesa	LONEOS	·	7.7 km	MPC · JPL
116145	2003 WA_{156}	—	November 29, 2003	Kitt Peak	Spacewatch	·	5.4 km	MPC · JPL
116146	2003 WJ_{156}	—	November 29, 2003	Socorro	LINEAR	EUN	2.5 km	MPC · JPL
116147	2003 WM_{157}	—	November 18, 2003	Kitt Peak	Spacewatch	·	1.1 km	MPC · JPL
116148	2003 WN_{157}	—	November 19, 2003	Anderson Mesa	LONEOS	·	1.4 km	MPC · JPL
116149	2003 WU_{158}	—	November 29, 2003	Needville	L. Casady, W. G. Dillion	·	2.0 km	MPC · JPL
116150	2003 WD_{163}	—	November 30, 2003	Socorro	LINEAR	EUN	2.6 km	MPC · JPL
116151	2003 WR_{164}	—	November 30, 2003	Kitt Peak	Spacewatch	AGN	1.9 km	MPC · JPL
116152	2003 WX_{165}	—	November 30, 2003	Kitt Peak	Spacewatch	·	8.7 km	MPC · JPL
116153	2003 WO_{166}	—	November 18, 2003	Anderson Mesa	LONEOS	·	5.5 km	MPC · JPL
116154	2003 WA_{168}	—	November 19, 2003	Palomar	NEAT	·	8.5 km	MPC · JPL
116155	2003 WW_{168}	—	November 19, 2003	Palomar	NEAT	·	1.8 km	MPC · JPL
116156	2003 WS_{170}	—	November 21, 2003	Catalina	CSS	·	3.2 km	MPC · JPL
116157	2003 WC_{171}	—	November 21, 2003	Palomar	NEAT	EUN	1.9 km	MPC · JPL
116158	2003 WU_{171}	—	November 29, 2003	Socorro	LINEAR	·	3.5 km	MPC · JPL
116159	2003 WZ_{171}	—	November 29, 2003	Socorro	LINEAR	·	2.7 km	MPC · JPL
116160	2003 WK_{176}	—	November 19, 2003	Socorro	LINEAR	·	4.0 km	MPC · JPL
116161	2003 WS_{176}	—	November 19, 2003	Kitt Peak	Spacewatch	NYS	1.8 km	MPC · JPL
116162 Sidneygutierrez	2003 WL_{181}	Sidneygutierrez	November 20, 2003	Kitt Peak	M. W. Buie	·	3.1 km	MPC · JPL
116163	2003 WW_{181}	—	November 21, 2003	Socorro	LINEAR	·	3.1 km	MPC · JPL
116164	2003 WD_{190}	—	November 24, 2003	Socorro	LINEAR	·	3.7 km	MPC · JPL
116165	2003 WU_{190}	—	November 20, 2003	Palomar	NEAT	·	2.4 km	MPC · JPL
116166 Andrémaeder	2003 XJ	Andrémaeder	December 3, 2003	La Silla	Behrend, R., Gauderon, R.	·	4.4 km	MPC · JPL
116167	2003 XG_{1}	—	December 1, 2003	Socorro	LINEAR	DOR	5.0 km	MPC · JPL
116168	2003 XR_{1}	—	December 1, 2003	Kitt Peak	Spacewatch	·	2.1 km	MPC · JPL
116169	2003 XL_{2}	—	December 1, 2003	Socorro	LINEAR	·	6.0 km	MPC · JPL
116170	2003 XW_{2}	—	December 1, 2003	Socorro	LINEAR	·	4.5 km	MPC · JPL
116171	2003 XX_{2}	—	December 1, 2003	Socorro	LINEAR	ADE	2.2 km	MPC · JPL
116172	2003 XE_{3}	—	December 1, 2003	Socorro	LINEAR	CYB	7.7 km	MPC · JPL
116173	2003 XF_{3}	—	December 1, 2003	Socorro	LINEAR	·	2.9 km	MPC · JPL
116174	2003 XR_{3}	—	December 1, 2003	Socorro	LINEAR	·	4.0 km	MPC · JPL
116175	2003 XZ_{3}	—	December 1, 2003	Socorro	LINEAR	·	2.9 km	MPC · JPL
116176	2003 XC_{4}	—	December 1, 2003	Socorro	LINEAR	·	1.8 km	MPC · JPL
116177	2003 XN_{4}	—	December 1, 2003	Socorro	LINEAR	·	6.3 km	MPC · JPL
116178	2003 XP_{4}	—	December 1, 2003	Socorro	LINEAR	·	5.1 km	MPC · JPL
116179	2003 XU_{4}	—	December 1, 2003	Socorro	LINEAR	·	2.7 km	MPC · JPL
116180	2003 XW_{4}	—	December 1, 2003	Kitt Peak	Spacewatch	·	2.3 km	MPC · JPL
116181	2003 XB_{5}	—	December 1, 2003	Catalina	CSS	·	4.5 km	MPC · JPL
116182	2003 XQ_{5}	—	December 3, 2003	Anderson Mesa	LONEOS	·	5.3 km	MPC · JPL
116183	2003 XD_{6}	—	December 3, 2003	Socorro	LINEAR	·	3.8 km	MPC · JPL
116184	2003 XH_{6}	—	December 3, 2003	Socorro	LINEAR	·	3.0 km	MPC · JPL
116185	2003 XK_{6}	—	December 3, 2003	Socorro	LINEAR	EUN	2.3 km	MPC · JPL
116186	2003 XZ_{7}	—	December 3, 2003	Socorro	LINEAR	·	4.3 km	MPC · JPL
116187	2003 XG_{8}	—	December 4, 2003	Socorro	LINEAR	(5)	2.6 km	MPC · JPL
116188	2003 XE_{9}	—	December 4, 2003	Socorro	LINEAR	·	6.5 km	MPC · JPL
116189	2003 XL_{9}	—	December 4, 2003	Socorro	LINEAR	·	3.4 km	MPC · JPL
116190	2003 XS_{9}	—	December 4, 2003	Socorro	LINEAR	·	2.5 km	MPC · JPL
116191	2003 XG_{10}	—	December 4, 2003	Socorro	LINEAR	·	4.0 km	MPC · JPL
116192	2003 XS_{10}	—	December 10, 2003	Nogales	Tenagra II	·	5.0 km	MPC · JPL
116193	2003 XK_{11}	—	December 12, 2003	Palomar	NEAT	·	3.4 km	MPC · JPL
116194	2003 XV_{11}	—	December 13, 2003	Socorro	LINEAR	EUP	8.4 km	MPC · JPL
116195	2003 XY_{11}	—	December 13, 2003	Socorro	LINEAR	·	5.4 km	MPC · JPL
116196	2003 XD_{13}	—	December 14, 2003	Kitt Peak	Spacewatch	·	4.3 km	MPC · JPL
116197	2003 XC_{14}	—	December 15, 2003	Socorro	LINEAR	fast	4.7 km	MPC · JPL
116198	2003 XJ_{14}	—	December 15, 2003	Socorro	LINEAR	HNS	3.1 km	MPC · JPL
116199	2003 XN_{14}	—	December 1, 2003	Socorro	LINEAR	·	7.2 km	MPC · JPL
116200	2003 XY_{14}	—	December 15, 2003	Socorro	LINEAR	PHO	3.3 km	MPC · JPL

== 116201–116300 ==
back to top

Designation			Discovery			Properties		Ref
Permanent	Provisional	Named after	Date	Site	Discoverer(s)	Category	Diam.	Ref
116201	2003 XS_{15}	—	December 3, 2003	Anderson Mesa	LONEOS	·	3.5 km	MPC · JPL
116202	2003 XE_{19}	—	December 14, 2003	Palomar	NEAT	·	3.1 km	MPC · JPL
116203	2003 XQ_{20}	—	December 14, 2003	Palomar	NEAT	NYS	1.7 km	MPC · JPL
116204	2003 XD_{22}	—	December 12, 2003	Palomar	NEAT	·	3.6 km	MPC · JPL
116205	2003 XR_{22}	—	December 5, 2003	Catalina	CSS	·	2.6 km	MPC · JPL
116206	2003 XZ_{32}	—	December 1, 2003	Kitt Peak	Spacewatch	THM	5.0 km	MPC · JPL
116207	2003 XS_{34}	—	December 3, 2003	Socorro	LINEAR	·	3.2 km	MPC · JPL
116208	2003 XY_{34}	—	December 3, 2003	Socorro	LINEAR	·	3.6 km	MPC · JPL
116209	2003 XC_{35}	—	December 3, 2003	Socorro	LINEAR	KOR	2.5 km	MPC · JPL
116210	2003 XT_{35}	—	December 3, 2003	Socorro	LINEAR	·	4.2 km	MPC · JPL
116211	2003 XA_{36}	—	December 3, 2003	Socorro	LINEAR	EOS	3.5 km	MPC · JPL
116212	2003 XP_{36}	—	December 3, 2003	Socorro	LINEAR	EUN	2.8 km	MPC · JPL
116213	2003 XS_{36}	—	December 3, 2003	Socorro	LINEAR	TEL	2.5 km	MPC · JPL
116214	2003 XA_{37}	—	December 3, 2003	Socorro	LINEAR	·	4.1 km	MPC · JPL
116215	2003 XW_{39}	—	December 13, 2003	Palomar	NEAT	·	3.5 km	MPC · JPL
116216	2003 XA_{41}	—	December 14, 2003	Kitt Peak	Spacewatch	(2076)	1.3 km	MPC · JPL
116217	2003 XK_{41}	—	December 14, 2003	Kitt Peak	Spacewatch	·	4.2 km	MPC · JPL
116218	2003 XQ_{42}	—	December 15, 2003	Socorro	LINEAR	·	3.3 km	MPC · JPL
116219	2003 YH	—	December 16, 2003	Socorro	LINEAR	·	6.7 km	MPC · JPL
116220	2003 YO_{2}	—	December 17, 2003	Kitt Peak	Spacewatch	·	1.5 km	MPC · JPL
116221	2003 YU_{3}	—	December 19, 2003	Socorro	LINEAR	H	1.7 km	MPC · JPL
116222	2003 YW_{3}	—	December 16, 2003	Catalina	CSS	(5)	2.6 km	MPC · JPL
116223	2003 YD_{4}	—	December 16, 2003	Catalina	CSS	EOS	3.4 km	MPC · JPL
116224	2003 YN_{4}	—	December 16, 2003	Kitt Peak	Spacewatch	·	2.4 km	MPC · JPL
116225	2003 YS_{4}	—	December 16, 2003	Kitt Peak	Spacewatch	·	2.0 km	MPC · JPL
116226	2003 YU_{4}	—	December 16, 2003	Kitt Peak	Spacewatch	·	7.0 km	MPC · JPL
116227	2003 YX_{4}	—	December 16, 2003	Catalina	CSS	·	5.7 km	MPC · JPL
116228	2003 YZ_{4}	—	December 16, 2003	Catalina	CSS	HYG	6.4 km	MPC · JPL
116229	2003 YF_{5}	—	December 16, 2003	Kitt Peak	Spacewatch	MAR	2.2 km	MPC · JPL
116230	2003 YH_{5}	—	December 16, 2003	Catalina	CSS	·	1.9 km	MPC · JPL
116231	2003 YO_{5}	—	December 16, 2003	Catalina	CSS	EOS	4.0 km	MPC · JPL
116232	2003 YW_{5}	—	December 16, 2003	Kitt Peak	Spacewatch	·	3.2 km	MPC · JPL
116233	2003 YY_{5}	—	December 16, 2003	Anderson Mesa	LONEOS	·	3.0 km	MPC · JPL
116234	2003 YT_{6}	—	December 17, 2003	Anderson Mesa	LONEOS	·	2.5 km	MPC · JPL
116235	2003 YW_{8}	—	December 19, 2003	Socorro	LINEAR	·	1.6 km	MPC · JPL
116236	2003 YH_{11}	—	December 17, 2003	Socorro	LINEAR	·	6.5 km	MPC · JPL
116237	2003 YF_{12}	—	December 17, 2003	Socorro	LINEAR	EOS	3.3 km	MPC · JPL
116238	2003 YJ_{12}	—	December 17, 2003	Socorro	LINEAR	L5	20 km	MPC · JPL
116239	2003 YR_{12}	—	December 17, 2003	Anderson Mesa	LONEOS	EOS	3.2 km	MPC · JPL
116240	2003 YQ_{13}	—	December 17, 2003	Catalina	CSS	·	2.6 km	MPC · JPL
116241	2003 YE_{14}	—	December 17, 2003	Socorro	LINEAR	·	3.1 km	MPC · JPL
116242	2003 YY_{14}	—	December 17, 2003	Socorro	LINEAR	·	1.6 km	MPC · JPL
116243	2003 YF_{15}	—	December 17, 2003	Socorro	LINEAR	·	6.7 km	MPC · JPL
116244	2003 YZ_{15}	—	December 17, 2003	Anderson Mesa	LONEOS	·	1.3 km	MPC · JPL
116245	2003 YC_{16}	—	December 17, 2003	Anderson Mesa	LONEOS	·	6.0 km	MPC · JPL
116246	2003 YK_{16}	—	December 17, 2003	Anderson Mesa	LONEOS	·	6.9 km	MPC · JPL
116247	2003 YJ_{18}	—	December 17, 2003	Kitt Peak	Spacewatch	V	1.3 km	MPC · JPL
116248	2003 YN_{20}	—	December 17, 2003	Kitt Peak	Spacewatch	·	2.5 km	MPC · JPL
116249	2003 YS_{21}	—	December 17, 2003	Kitt Peak	Spacewatch	·	1.6 km	MPC · JPL
116250	2003 YK_{22}	—	December 18, 2003	Socorro	LINEAR	·	2.3 km	MPC · JPL
116251	2003 YV_{23}	—	December 17, 2003	Socorro	LINEAR	·	6.2 km	MPC · JPL
116252	2003 YW_{23}	—	December 17, 2003	Kitt Peak	Spacewatch	·	2.7 km	MPC · JPL
116253	2003 YV_{25}	—	December 18, 2003	Socorro	LINEAR	·	5.0 km	MPC · JPL
116254	2003 YR_{26}	—	December 18, 2003	Kitt Peak	Spacewatch	PHO	1.9 km	MPC · JPL
116255	2003 YA_{27}	—	December 16, 2003	Anderson Mesa	LONEOS	·	2.8 km	MPC · JPL
116256	2003 YF_{27}	—	December 16, 2003	Črni Vrh	Mikuž, H.	·	4.6 km	MPC · JPL
116257	2003 YY_{27}	—	December 17, 2003	Palomar	NEAT	EMA	6.1 km	MPC · JPL
116258	2003 YY_{29}	—	December 17, 2003	Palomar	NEAT	·	2.5 km	MPC · JPL
116259	2003 YB_{30}	—	December 18, 2003	Kitt Peak	Spacewatch	·	1.6 km	MPC · JPL
116260	2003 YZ_{31}	—	December 18, 2003	Kitt Peak	Spacewatch	(5)	1.7 km	MPC · JPL
116261	2003 YF_{32}	—	December 18, 2003	Socorro	LINEAR	·	3.7 km	MPC · JPL
116262	2003 YJ_{32}	—	December 18, 2003	Socorro	LINEAR	EOS	3.1 km	MPC · JPL
116263	2003 YR_{32}	—	December 22, 2003	Palomar	NEAT	GAL	2.6 km	MPC · JPL
116264	2003 YY_{32}	—	December 16, 2003	Kitt Peak	Spacewatch	·	5.3 km	MPC · JPL
116265	2003 YB_{33}	—	December 16, 2003	Catalina	CSS	WIT	1.7 km	MPC · JPL
116266	2003 YF_{33}	—	December 16, 2003	Kitt Peak	Spacewatch	·	2.5 km	MPC · JPL
116267	2003 YX_{33}	—	December 17, 2003	Anderson Mesa	LONEOS	·	4.0 km	MPC · JPL
116268	2003 YU_{34}	—	December 18, 2003	Socorro	LINEAR	V	1.2 km	MPC · JPL
116269	2003 YB_{35}	—	December 18, 2003	Haleakala	NEAT	·	5.9 km	MPC · JPL
116270	2003 YJ_{35}	—	December 19, 2003	Socorro	LINEAR	·	1.7 km	MPC · JPL
116271	2003 YQ_{35}	—	December 19, 2003	Socorro	LINEAR	·	4.7 km	MPC · JPL
116272	2003 YA_{41}	—	December 19, 2003	Kitt Peak	Spacewatch	·	2.8 km	MPC · JPL
116273	2003 YX_{41}	—	December 19, 2003	Kitt Peak	Spacewatch	·	3.8 km	MPC · JPL
116274	2003 YX_{42}	—	December 19, 2003	Kitt Peak	Spacewatch	·	5.7 km	MPC · JPL
116275	2003 YH_{43}	—	December 19, 2003	Socorro	LINEAR	·	2.6 km	MPC · JPL
116276	2003 YE_{44}	—	December 19, 2003	Kitt Peak	Spacewatch	·	3.5 km	MPC · JPL
116277	2003 YS_{45}	—	December 17, 2003	Anderson Mesa	LONEOS	AGN	2.3 km	MPC · JPL
116278	2003 YY_{45}	—	December 17, 2003	Socorro	LINEAR	·	7.1 km	MPC · JPL
116279	2003 YG_{46}	—	December 17, 2003	Palomar	NEAT	·	2.7 km	MPC · JPL
116280	2003 YH_{47}	—	December 17, 2003	Kitt Peak	Spacewatch	3:2	10 km	MPC · JPL
116281	2003 YR_{47}	—	December 18, 2003	Socorro	LINEAR	·	2.9 km	MPC · JPL
116282	2003 YU_{50}	—	December 18, 2003	Socorro	LINEAR	·	7.5 km	MPC · JPL
116283	2003 YS_{51}	—	December 18, 2003	Socorro	LINEAR	·	1.6 km	MPC · JPL
116284	2003 YC_{52}	—	December 18, 2003	Socorro	LINEAR	·	3.6 km	MPC · JPL
116285	2003 YG_{52}	—	December 18, 2003	Socorro	LINEAR	·	1.5 km	MPC · JPL
116286	2003 YB_{53}	—	December 19, 2003	Socorro	LINEAR	·	2.4 km	MPC · JPL
116287	2003 YF_{54}	—	December 19, 2003	Kitt Peak	Spacewatch	·	4.6 km	MPC · JPL
116288	2003 YV_{54}	—	December 19, 2003	Socorro	LINEAR	KOR	2.5 km	MPC · JPL
116289	2003 YO_{55}	—	December 19, 2003	Socorro	LINEAR	(5)	2.3 km	MPC · JPL
116290	2003 YO_{56}	—	December 19, 2003	Socorro	LINEAR	THM	4.1 km	MPC · JPL
116291	2003 YD_{57}	—	December 19, 2003	Socorro	LINEAR	·	3.2 km	MPC · JPL
116292	2003 YO_{57}	—	December 19, 2003	Socorro	LINEAR	·	2.9 km	MPC · JPL
116293	2003 YU_{57}	—	December 19, 2003	Socorro	LINEAR	·	3.0 km	MPC · JPL
116294	2003 YE_{58}	—	December 19, 2003	Socorro	LINEAR	T_{j} (2.99) · 3:2	11 km	MPC · JPL
116295	2003 YL_{58}	—	December 19, 2003	Socorro	LINEAR	·	4.0 km	MPC · JPL
116296	2003 YT_{58}	—	December 19, 2003	Socorro	LINEAR	(31811)	5.3 km	MPC · JPL
116297	2003 YR_{59}	—	December 19, 2003	Kitt Peak	Spacewatch	·	1.7 km	MPC · JPL
116298	2003 YY_{59}	—	December 19, 2003	Kitt Peak	Spacewatch	·	3.0 km	MPC · JPL
116299	2003 YJ_{60}	—	December 19, 2003	Kitt Peak	Spacewatch	·	1.8 km	MPC · JPL
116300	2003 YW_{60}	—	December 19, 2003	Socorro	LINEAR	EUP	6.3 km	MPC · JPL

== 116301–116400 ==
back to top

Designation			Discovery			Properties		Ref
Permanent	Provisional	Named after	Date	Site	Discoverer(s)	Category	Diam.	Ref
116301	2003 YZ_{60}	—	December 19, 2003	Socorro	LINEAR	slow	5.2 km	MPC · JPL
116302	2003 YH_{61}	—	December 19, 2003	Socorro	LINEAR	THM	5.9 km	MPC · JPL
116303	2003 YK_{61}	—	December 19, 2003	Socorro	LINEAR	(5) · fast	2.3 km	MPC · JPL
116304	2003 YV_{61}	—	December 19, 2003	Socorro	LINEAR	·	2.8 km	MPC · JPL
116305	2003 YL_{62}	—	December 19, 2003	Socorro	LINEAR	EUN	2.7 km	MPC · JPL
116306	2003 YQ_{62}	—	December 19, 2003	Socorro	LINEAR	·	6.1 km	MPC · JPL
116307	2003 YX_{62}	—	December 19, 2003	Socorro	LINEAR	·	3.8 km	MPC · JPL
116308	2003 YR_{63}	—	December 19, 2003	Socorro	LINEAR	·	2.5 km	MPC · JPL
116309	2003 YF_{64}	—	December 19, 2003	Socorro	LINEAR	(5)	2.2 km	MPC · JPL
116310	2003 YA_{65}	—	December 19, 2003	Socorro	LINEAR	·	4.7 km	MPC · JPL
116311	2003 YQ_{65}	—	December 19, 2003	Socorro	LINEAR	·	5.0 km	MPC · JPL
116312	2003 YS_{65}	—	December 19, 2003	Socorro	LINEAR	·	3.2 km	MPC · JPL
116313	2003 YT_{65}	—	December 19, 2003	Haleakala	NEAT	·	5.1 km	MPC · JPL
116314	2003 YA_{66}	—	December 20, 2003	Socorro	LINEAR	·	3.9 km	MPC · JPL
116315	2003 YE_{66}	—	December 20, 2003	Socorro	LINEAR	·	1.5 km	MPC · JPL
116316	2003 YJ_{68}	—	December 19, 2003	Socorro	LINEAR	EOS	3.6 km	MPC · JPL
116317	2003 YZ_{68}	—	December 20, 2003	Socorro	LINEAR	·	3.0 km	MPC · JPL
116318	2003 YB_{69}	—	December 20, 2003	Socorro	LINEAR	·	2.6 km	MPC · JPL
116319	2003 YF_{69}	—	December 20, 2003	Socorro	LINEAR	slow	5.3 km	MPC · JPL
116320	2003 YW_{69}	—	December 21, 2003	Socorro	LINEAR	·	2.3 km	MPC · JPL
116321	2003 YB_{70}	—	December 21, 2003	Socorro	LINEAR	URS	6.5 km	MPC · JPL
116322	2003 YJ_{72}	—	December 18, 2003	Socorro	LINEAR	·	2.7 km	MPC · JPL
116323	2003 YP_{72}	—	December 18, 2003	Socorro	LINEAR	·	3.2 km	MPC · JPL
116324	2003 YT_{72}	—	December 18, 2003	Socorro	LINEAR	·	5.9 km	MPC · JPL
116325	2003 YV_{72}	—	December 18, 2003	Socorro	LINEAR	·	6.7 km	MPC · JPL
116326	2003 YH_{73}	—	December 18, 2003	Socorro	LINEAR	V	1.3 km	MPC · JPL
116327	2003 YJ_{73}	—	December 18, 2003	Socorro	LINEAR	(5)	2.2 km	MPC · JPL
116328	2003 YL_{73}	—	December 18, 2003	Socorro	LINEAR	·	1.5 km	MPC · JPL
116329	2003 YZ_{73}	—	December 18, 2003	Socorro	LINEAR	·	5.8 km	MPC · JPL
116330	2003 YN_{74}	—	December 18, 2003	Socorro	LINEAR	·	1.3 km	MPC · JPL
116331	2003 YS_{74}	—	December 18, 2003	Socorro	LINEAR	·	2.7 km	MPC · JPL
116332	2003 YC_{75}	—	December 18, 2003	Socorro	LINEAR	·	2.5 km	MPC · JPL
116333	2003 YC_{76}	—	December 18, 2003	Socorro	LINEAR	HYG	5.9 km	MPC · JPL
116334	2003 YP_{76}	—	December 18, 2003	Socorro	LINEAR	·	3.4 km	MPC · JPL
116335	2003 YA_{77}	—	December 18, 2003	Socorro	LINEAR	·	7.6 km	MPC · JPL
116336	2003 YB_{77}	—	December 18, 2003	Socorro	LINEAR	·	6.4 km	MPC · JPL
116337	2003 YF_{77}	—	December 18, 2003	Socorro	LINEAR	·	2.3 km	MPC · JPL
116338	2003 YH_{78}	—	December 18, 2003	Socorro	LINEAR	·	2.3 km	MPC · JPL
116339	2003 YZ_{78}	—	December 18, 2003	Socorro	LINEAR	(5)	2.3 km	MPC · JPL
116340	2003 YC_{81}	—	December 18, 2003	Socorro	LINEAR	·	5.5 km	MPC · JPL
116341	2003 YF_{81}	—	December 18, 2003	Socorro	LINEAR	·	5.1 km	MPC · JPL
116342	2003 YH_{81}	—	December 18, 2003	Socorro	LINEAR	URS	8.2 km	MPC · JPL
116343	2003 YY_{83}	—	December 19, 2003	Socorro	LINEAR	fast	1.5 km	MPC · JPL
116344	2003 YB_{84}	—	December 19, 2003	Socorro	LINEAR	AGN	2.3 km	MPC · JPL
116345	2003 YJ_{84}	—	December 19, 2003	Socorro	LINEAR	VER	7.0 km	MPC · JPL
116346	2003 YP_{84}	—	December 19, 2003	Socorro	LINEAR	HYG	5.9 km	MPC · JPL
116347	2003 YQ_{86}	—	December 19, 2003	Socorro	LINEAR	EUN	3.1 km	MPC · JPL
116348	2003 YF_{89}	—	December 19, 2003	Socorro	LINEAR	·	4.8 km	MPC · JPL
116349	2003 YM_{89}	—	December 19, 2003	Socorro	LINEAR	·	2.5 km	MPC · JPL
116350	2003 YU_{89}	—	December 19, 2003	Kitt Peak	Spacewatch	V	1.0 km	MPC · JPL
116351	2003 YW_{89}	—	December 19, 2003	Kitt Peak	Spacewatch	·	3.9 km	MPC · JPL
116352	2003 YZ_{90}	—	December 20, 2003	Socorro	LINEAR	LIX	6.8 km	MPC · JPL
116353	2003 YC_{91}	—	December 20, 2003	Socorro	LINEAR	·	6.0 km	MPC · JPL
116354	2003 YL_{91}	—	December 20, 2003	Socorro	LINEAR	·	4.5 km	MPC · JPL
116355	2003 YT_{91}	—	December 20, 2003	Haleakala	NEAT	·	5.5 km	MPC · JPL
116356	2003 YV_{91}	—	December 21, 2003	Catalina	CSS	EOS	4.3 km	MPC · JPL
116357	2003 YH_{92}	—	December 21, 2003	Catalina	CSS	·	4.1 km	MPC · JPL
116358	2003 YB_{94}	—	December 21, 2003	Kitt Peak	Spacewatch	·	2.7 km	MPC · JPL
116359	2003 YX_{94}	—	December 19, 2003	Socorro	LINEAR	THM	4.0 km	MPC · JPL
116360	2003 YN_{95}	—	December 19, 2003	Socorro	LINEAR	·	4.7 km	MPC · JPL
116361	2003 YZ_{95}	—	December 19, 2003	Socorro	LINEAR	·	1.9 km	MPC · JPL
116362	2003 YZ_{96}	—	December 19, 2003	Socorro	LINEAR	·	4.1 km	MPC · JPL
116363	2003 YN_{100}	—	December 19, 2003	Socorro	LINEAR	·	2.0 km	MPC · JPL
116364	2003 YQ_{101}	—	December 19, 2003	Socorro	LINEAR	·	4.0 km	MPC · JPL
116365	2003 YU_{101}	—	December 19, 2003	Socorro	LINEAR	·	3.5 km	MPC · JPL
116366	2003 YG_{102}	—	December 19, 2003	Socorro	LINEAR	·	3.9 km	MPC · JPL
116367	2003 YZ_{102}	—	December 19, 2003	Socorro	LINEAR	·	3.2 km	MPC · JPL
116368	2003 YS_{104}	—	December 21, 2003	Socorro	LINEAR	·	3.6 km	MPC · JPL
116369	2003 YS_{106}	—	December 22, 2003	Socorro	LINEAR	·	2.9 km	MPC · JPL
116370	2003 YY_{106}	—	December 22, 2003	Socorro	LINEAR	·	3.6 km	MPC · JPL
116371	2003 YG_{107}	—	December 22, 2003	Kitt Peak	Spacewatch	·	2.5 km	MPC · JPL
116372	2003 YJ_{108}	—	December 21, 2003	Catalina	CSS	EUN	2.3 km	MPC · JPL
116373	2003 YK_{108}	—	December 21, 2003	Catalina	CSS	·	4.0 km	MPC · JPL
116374	2003 YA_{110}	—	December 23, 2003	Socorro	LINEAR	(18466)	4.7 km	MPC · JPL
116375	2003 YU_{111}	—	December 23, 2003	Socorro	LINEAR	·	6.2 km	MPC · JPL
116376	2003 YF_{113}	—	December 23, 2003	Socorro	LINEAR	EUP	8.6 km	MPC · JPL
116377	2003 YL_{113}	—	December 23, 2003	Socorro	LINEAR	·	2.3 km	MPC · JPL
116378	2003 YJ_{114}	—	December 25, 2003	Kitt Peak	Spacewatch	·	2.8 km	MPC · JPL
116379	2003 YB_{115}	—	December 27, 2003	Kitt Peak	Spacewatch	·	3.2 km	MPC · JPL
116380	2003 YU_{116}	—	December 27, 2003	Socorro	LINEAR	·	6.4 km	MPC · JPL
116381	2003 YV_{116}	—	December 27, 2003	Socorro	LINEAR	·	2.1 km	MPC · JPL
116382	2003 YF_{121}	—	December 27, 2003	Socorro	LINEAR	V	1.4 km	MPC · JPL
116383	2003 YG_{123}	—	December 27, 2003	Socorro	LINEAR	(5651)	6.5 km	MPC · JPL
116384	2003 YQ_{123}	—	December 28, 2003	Kitt Peak	Spacewatch	·	2.4 km	MPC · JPL
116385	2003 YE_{124}	—	December 28, 2003	Socorro	LINEAR	·	5.2 km	MPC · JPL
116386	2003 YZ_{125}	—	December 27, 2003	Kitt Peak	Spacewatch	·	3.8 km	MPC · JPL
116387	2003 YM_{126}	—	December 27, 2003	Socorro	LINEAR	ADE	5.2 km	MPC · JPL
116388	2003 YQ_{126}	—	December 27, 2003	Socorro	LINEAR	·	6.4 km	MPC · JPL
116389	2003 YO_{127}	—	December 27, 2003	Socorro	LINEAR	·	3.5 km	MPC · JPL
116390	2003 YU_{127}	—	December 27, 2003	Socorro	LINEAR	·	3.6 km	MPC · JPL
116391	2003 YF_{128}	—	December 27, 2003	Socorro	LINEAR	·	3.4 km	MPC · JPL
116392	2003 YZ_{128}	—	December 27, 2003	Socorro	LINEAR	·	3.3 km	MPC · JPL
116393	2003 YF_{129}	—	December 27, 2003	Socorro	LINEAR	·	2.0 km	MPC · JPL
116394	2003 YR_{129}	—	December 27, 2003	Socorro	LINEAR	EOS ·	6.3 km	MPC · JPL
116395	2003 YC_{130}	—	December 27, 2003	Socorro	LINEAR	·	1.7 km	MPC · JPL
116396	2003 YJ_{132}	—	December 28, 2003	Socorro	LINEAR	·	3.2 km	MPC · JPL
116397	2003 YS_{132}	—	December 28, 2003	Socorro	LINEAR	·	5.2 km	MPC · JPL
116398	2003 YX_{132}	—	December 28, 2003	Socorro	LINEAR	EOS	4.2 km	MPC · JPL
116399	2003 YV_{133}	—	December 28, 2003	Socorro	LINEAR	·	3.8 km	MPC · JPL
116400	2003 YY_{133}	—	December 28, 2003	Socorro	LINEAR	·	5.5 km	MPC · JPL

== 116401–116500 ==
back to top

Designation			Discovery			Properties		Ref
Permanent	Provisional	Named after	Date	Site	Discoverer(s)	Category	Diam.	Ref
116401	2003 YA_{135}	—	December 28, 2003	Socorro	LINEAR	H	1.3 km	MPC · JPL
116402	2003 YJ_{135}	—	December 28, 2003	Socorro	LINEAR	·	3.2 km	MPC · JPL
116403	2003 YR_{135}	—	December 28, 2003	Socorro	LINEAR	·	3.8 km	MPC · JPL
116404	2003 YU_{135}	—	December 28, 2003	Kitt Peak	Spacewatch	·	2.5 km	MPC · JPL
116405	2003 YX_{135}	—	December 28, 2003	Kitt Peak	Spacewatch	·	7.4 km	MPC · JPL
116406	2003 YP_{136}	—	December 18, 2003	Palomar	NEAT	EOS	3.8 km	MPC · JPL
116407	2003 YU_{136}	—	December 25, 2003	Socorro	LINEAR	·	3.6 km	MPC · JPL
116408	2003 YX_{137}	—	December 27, 2003	Socorro	LINEAR	·	2.1 km	MPC · JPL
116409	2003 YE_{138}	—	December 27, 2003	Socorro	LINEAR	NYS	2.2 km	MPC · JPL
116410	2003 YQ_{138}	—	December 27, 2003	Socorro	LINEAR	·	8.1 km	MPC · JPL
116411	2003 YB_{139}	—	December 27, 2003	Haleakala	NEAT	·	4.7 km	MPC · JPL
116412	2003 YC_{139}	—	December 27, 2003	Kitt Peak	Spacewatch	NYS	2.2 km	MPC · JPL
116413	2003 YM_{139}	—	December 28, 2003	Socorro	LINEAR	·	3.5 km	MPC · JPL
116414	2003 YF_{141}	—	December 28, 2003	Socorro	LINEAR	·	4.8 km	MPC · JPL
116415	2003 YX_{141}	—	December 28, 2003	Socorro	LINEAR	EOS	3.6 km	MPC · JPL
116416	2003 YM_{142}	—	December 28, 2003	Socorro	LINEAR	·	5.0 km	MPC · JPL
116417	2003 YO_{143}	—	December 28, 2003	Socorro	LINEAR	·	4.2 km	MPC · JPL
116418	2003 YW_{143}	—	December 28, 2003	Socorro	LINEAR	·	2.7 km	MPC · JPL
116419	2003 YT_{144}	—	December 28, 2003	Socorro	LINEAR	·	4.1 km	MPC · JPL
116420	2003 YW_{146}	—	December 28, 2003	Socorro	LINEAR	·	6.4 km	MPC · JPL
116421	2003 YF_{149}	—	December 29, 2003	Catalina	CSS	·	4.0 km	MPC · JPL
116422	2003 YJ_{149}	—	December 29, 2003	Catalina	CSS	·	3.6 km	MPC · JPL
116423	2003 YD_{150}	—	December 29, 2003	Socorro	LINEAR	·	3.8 km	MPC · JPL
116424	2003 YV_{150}	—	December 29, 2003	Catalina	CSS	EOS	7.2 km	MPC · JPL
116425	2003 YX_{150}	—	December 29, 2003	Catalina	CSS	·	7.6 km	MPC · JPL
116426	2003 YG_{151}	—	December 29, 2003	Catalina	CSS	·	6.8 km	MPC · JPL
116427	2003 YH_{151}	—	December 29, 2003	Catalina	CSS	EUN	3.9 km	MPC · JPL
116428	2003 YX_{151}	—	December 29, 2003	Socorro	LINEAR	·	3.2 km	MPC · JPL
116429	2003 YB_{153}	—	December 29, 2003	Catalina	CSS	·	6.3 km	MPC · JPL
116430	2003 YD_{153}	—	December 29, 2003	Catalina	CSS	JUN	2.2 km	MPC · JPL
116431	2003 YF_{153}	—	December 29, 2003	Kitt Peak	Spacewatch	·	1.5 km	MPC · JPL
116432	2003 YM_{153}	—	December 29, 2003	Socorro	LINEAR	·	9.6 km	MPC · JPL
116433	2003 YN_{153}	—	December 29, 2003	Socorro	LINEAR	·	5.9 km	MPC · JPL
116434	2003 YK_{154}	—	December 29, 2003	Socorro	LINEAR	·	4.4 km	MPC · JPL
116435	2003 YJ_{155}	—	December 30, 2003	Socorro	LINEAR	EUN	2.4 km	MPC · JPL
116436	2003 YK_{158}	—	December 17, 2003	Socorro	LINEAR	EOS	4.1 km	MPC · JPL
116437	2003 YT_{159}	—	December 17, 2003	Socorro	LINEAR	·	2.6 km	MPC · JPL
116438	2003 YL_{160}	—	December 17, 2003	Socorro	LINEAR	MRX	1.6 km	MPC · JPL
116439	2003 YN_{162}	—	December 17, 2003	Socorro	LINEAR	L5	10 km	MPC · JPL
116440	2003 YK_{163}	—	December 17, 2003	Kitt Peak	Spacewatch	·	1.3 km	MPC · JPL
116441	2003 YU_{166}	—	December 17, 2003	Kitt Peak	Spacewatch	·	2.3 km	MPC · JPL
116442	2003 YR_{167}	—	December 18, 2003	Socorro	LINEAR	·	3.4 km	MPC · JPL
116443	2003 YU_{170}	—	December 18, 2003	Socorro	LINEAR	·	3.2 km	MPC · JPL
116444	2003 YZ_{172}	—	December 19, 2003	Socorro	LINEAR	·	4.8 km	MPC · JPL
116445	2003 YM_{175}	—	December 19, 2003	Kitt Peak	Spacewatch	MAS	1.3 km	MPC · JPL
116446 McDermid	2004 AG	McDermid	January 5, 2004	Wrightwood	J. W. Young	AST	3.7 km	MPC · JPL
116447	2004 AJ	—	January 11, 2004	Palomar	NEAT	·	9.9 km	MPC · JPL
116448	2004 AT	—	January 12, 2004	Palomar	NEAT	·	6.4 km	MPC · JPL
116449	2004 AU	—	January 12, 2004	Palomar	NEAT	LIX	7.2 km	MPC · JPL
116450	2004 AW	—	January 12, 2004	Palomar	NEAT	CYB	8.6 km	MPC · JPL
116451	2004 AL_{1}	—	January 12, 2004	Palomar	NEAT	·	5.5 km	MPC · JPL
116452	2004 AN_{1}	—	January 12, 2004	Palomar	NEAT	·	6.0 km	MPC · JPL
116453	2004 AV_{1}	—	January 12, 2004	Palomar	NEAT	·	3.6 km	MPC · JPL
116454	2004 AM_{2}	—	January 13, 2004	Anderson Mesa	LONEOS	·	2.9 km	MPC · JPL
116455	2004 AT_{2}	—	January 13, 2004	Anderson Mesa	LONEOS	EUN	2.4 km	MPC · JPL
116456	2004 AH_{5}	—	January 13, 2004	Anderson Mesa	LONEOS	·	3.5 km	MPC · JPL
116457	2004 AL_{5}	—	January 13, 2004	Anderson Mesa	LONEOS	NYS	3.0 km	MPC · JPL
116458	2004 AX_{5}	—	January 13, 2004	Anderson Mesa	LONEOS	·	5.7 km	MPC · JPL
116459	2004 AA_{6}	—	January 13, 2004	Palomar	NEAT	NYS	2.0 km	MPC · JPL
116460	2004 AD_{7}	—	January 14, 2004	Palomar	NEAT	EOS	3.7 km	MPC · JPL
116461	2004 AL_{7}	—	January 13, 2004	Anderson Mesa	LONEOS	·	5.5 km	MPC · JPL
116462	2004 AG_{8}	—	January 13, 2004	Anderson Mesa	LONEOS	EUN	2.0 km	MPC · JPL
116463	2004 AX_{8}	—	January 14, 2004	Palomar	NEAT	·	3.7 km	MPC · JPL
116464	2004 AH_{9}	—	January 14, 2004	Palomar	NEAT	·	2.2 km	MPC · JPL
116465	2004 AN_{9}	—	January 14, 2004	Palomar	NEAT	EOS	3.1 km	MPC · JPL
116466	2004 AT_{9}	—	January 15, 2004	Kitt Peak	Spacewatch	·	5.1 km	MPC · JPL
116467	2004 AK_{10}	—	January 15, 2004	Kitt Peak	Spacewatch	·	1.9 km	MPC · JPL
116468	2004 AA_{11}	—	January 2, 2004	Socorro	LINEAR	URS	7.6 km	MPC · JPL
116469	2004 AJ_{21}	—	January 15, 2004	Kitt Peak	Spacewatch	KOR	1.9 km	MPC · JPL
116470	2004 AJ_{24}	—	January 15, 2004	Kitt Peak	Spacewatch	(5)	2.1 km	MPC · JPL
116471	2004 AJ_{26}	—	January 13, 2004	Palomar	NEAT	·	1.7 km	MPC · JPL
116472	2004 BE_{2}	—	January 16, 2004	Palomar	NEAT	·	5.1 km	MPC · JPL
116473	2004 BA_{3}	—	January 16, 2004	Palomar	NEAT	·	4.6 km	MPC · JPL
116474	2004 BP_{3}	—	January 16, 2004	Palomar	NEAT	·	3.2 km	MPC · JPL
116475	2004 BA_{4}	—	January 16, 2004	Palomar	NEAT	·	6.0 km	MPC · JPL
116476	2004 BE_{4}	—	January 16, 2004	Palomar	NEAT	MRX	2.1 km	MPC · JPL
116477	2004 BL_{5}	—	January 16, 2004	Kitt Peak	Spacewatch	·	3.0 km	MPC · JPL
116478	2004 BT_{5}	—	January 16, 2004	Kitt Peak	Spacewatch	·	3.2 km	MPC · JPL
116479	2004 BB_{6}	—	January 16, 2004	Kitt Peak	Spacewatch	·	1.0 km	MPC · JPL
116480	2004 BS_{6}	—	January 17, 2004	Haleakala	NEAT	·	4.7 km	MPC · JPL
116481	2004 BW_{6}	—	January 16, 2004	Anderson Mesa	LONEOS	·	5.9 km	MPC · JPL
116482	2004 BX_{6}	—	January 16, 2004	Catalina	CSS	·	3.1 km	MPC · JPL
116483	2004 BJ_{8}	—	January 17, 2004	Kitt Peak	Spacewatch	AGN	1.8 km	MPC · JPL
116484	2004 BD_{10}	—	January 16, 2004	Palomar	NEAT	·	1.4 km	MPC · JPL
116485	2004 BS_{10}	—	January 17, 2004	Haleakala	NEAT	·	8.2 km	MPC · JPL
116486	2004 BV_{11}	—	January 16, 2004	Palomar	NEAT	·	4.5 km	MPC · JPL
116487	2004 BC_{12}	—	January 16, 2004	Palomar	NEAT	KOR	2.1 km	MPC · JPL
116488	2004 BG_{12}	—	January 16, 2004	Palomar	NEAT	·	4.7 km	MPC · JPL
116489	2004 BN_{12}	—	January 17, 2004	Palomar	NEAT	3:2	8.1 km	MPC · JPL
116490	2004 BR_{12}	—	January 17, 2004	Palomar	NEAT	·	4.5 km	MPC · JPL
116491	2004 BU_{12}	—	January 17, 2004	Palomar	NEAT	·	6.5 km	MPC · JPL
116492	2004 BG_{13}	—	January 17, 2004	Palomar	NEAT	·	3.0 km	MPC · JPL
116493	2004 BL_{13}	—	January 17, 2004	Palomar	NEAT	CYB	5.7 km	MPC · JPL
116494	2004 BE_{15}	—	January 16, 2004	Kitt Peak	Spacewatch	·	4.8 km	MPC · JPL
116495	2004 BS_{15}	—	January 17, 2004	Palomar	NEAT	·	3.6 km	MPC · JPL
116496	2004 BH_{16}	—	January 18, 2004	Palomar	NEAT	EUN	3.3 km	MPC · JPL
116497	2004 BG_{17}	—	January 17, 2004	Palomar	NEAT	MAR	3.6 km	MPC · JPL
116498	2004 BS_{19}	—	January 17, 2004	Palomar	NEAT	CYB	8.4 km	MPC · JPL
116499	2004 BF_{21}	—	January 17, 2004	Kitt Peak	Spacewatch	MRX	1.9 km	MPC · JPL
116500	2004 BG_{22}	—	January 17, 2004	Palomar	NEAT	KOR	2.9 km	MPC · JPL

== 116501–116600 ==
back to top

Designation			Discovery			Properties		Ref
Permanent	Provisional	Named after	Date	Site	Discoverer(s)	Category	Diam.	Ref
116501	2004 BP_{22}	—	January 17, 2004	Palomar	NEAT	V	1.2 km	MPC · JPL
116502	2004 BV_{22}	—	January 17, 2004	Kitt Peak	Spacewatch	·	7.1 km	MPC · JPL
116503	2004 BN_{23}	—	January 18, 2004	Palomar	NEAT	KOR	2.6 km	MPC · JPL
116504	2004 BV_{23}	—	January 19, 2004	Anderson Mesa	LONEOS	·	2.7 km	MPC · JPL
116505	2004 BN_{25}	—	January 19, 2004	Catalina	CSS	NYS	2.0 km	MPC · JPL
116506	2004 BQ_{25}	—	January 19, 2004	Socorro	LINEAR	·	3.2 km	MPC · JPL
116507	2004 BL_{26}	—	January 21, 2004	Socorro	LINEAR	KOR	2.8 km	MPC · JPL
116508	2004 BO_{26}	—	January 21, 2004	Socorro	LINEAR	MAS	1.1 km	MPC · JPL
116509	2004 BH_{27}	—	January 19, 2004	Haleakala	NEAT	PHO	2.3 km	MPC · JPL
116510	2004 BK_{30}	—	January 18, 2004	Palomar	NEAT	·	2.4 km	MPC · JPL
116511	2004 BW_{34}	—	January 19, 2004	Kitt Peak	Spacewatch	KOR	1.9 km	MPC · JPL
116512	2004 BN_{38}	—	January 20, 2004	Socorro	LINEAR	3:2	7.8 km	MPC · JPL
116513	2004 BM_{39}	—	January 21, 2004	Socorro	LINEAR	·	1.6 km	MPC · JPL
116514	2004 BS_{39}	—	January 21, 2004	Socorro	LINEAR	·	1.6 km	MPC · JPL
116515	2004 BF_{40}	—	January 21, 2004	Socorro	LINEAR	·	2.9 km	MPC · JPL
116516	2004 BA_{42}	—	January 19, 2004	Catalina	CSS	ULA · CYB	11 km	MPC · JPL
116517	2004 BG_{42}	—	January 19, 2004	Catalina	CSS	·	2.9 km	MPC · JPL
116518	2004 BS_{42}	—	January 19, 2004	Catalina	CSS	·	5.5 km	MPC · JPL
116519	2004 BF_{43}	—	January 22, 2004	Socorro	LINEAR	·	5.9 km	MPC · JPL
116520	2004 BC_{44}	—	January 22, 2004	Socorro	LINEAR	·	5.9 km	MPC · JPL
116521	2004 BG_{44}	—	January 22, 2004	Socorro	LINEAR	·	2.5 km	MPC · JPL
116522	2004 BV_{44}	—	January 21, 2004	Socorro	LINEAR	H	910 m	MPC · JPL
116523	2004 BH_{46}	—	January 21, 2004	Socorro	LINEAR	EUN	2.3 km	MPC · JPL
116524	2004 BP_{46}	—	January 21, 2004	Socorro	LINEAR	EOS	3.7 km	MPC · JPL
116525	2004 BG_{47}	—	January 21, 2004	Socorro	LINEAR	MAR	2.5 km	MPC · JPL
116526	2004 BS_{47}	—	January 21, 2004	Socorro	LINEAR	·	4.9 km	MPC · JPL
116527	2004 BJ_{51}	—	January 21, 2004	Socorro	LINEAR	·	3.6 km	MPC · JPL
116528	2004 BA_{52}	—	January 21, 2004	Socorro	LINEAR	·	1.8 km	MPC · JPL
116529	2004 BV_{52}	—	January 21, 2004	Socorro	LINEAR	KOR	2.3 km	MPC · JPL
116530	2004 BQ_{54}	—	January 22, 2004	Socorro	LINEAR	·	3.6 km	MPC · JPL
116531	2004 BA_{55}	—	January 22, 2004	Socorro	LINEAR	(2076)	2.4 km	MPC · JPL
116532	2004 BM_{56}	—	January 23, 2004	Anderson Mesa	LONEOS	NYS	2.1 km	MPC · JPL
116533	2004 BY_{56}	—	January 23, 2004	Socorro	LINEAR	·	5.6 km	MPC · JPL
116534	2004 BU_{57}	—	January 23, 2004	Anderson Mesa	LONEOS	·	3.8 km	MPC · JPL
116535	2004 BE_{58}	—	January 23, 2004	Socorro	LINEAR	·	8.0 km	MPC · JPL
116536	2004 BF_{58}	—	January 23, 2004	Socorro	LINEAR	·	2.4 km	MPC · JPL
116537	2004 BC_{59}	—	January 23, 2004	Anderson Mesa	LONEOS	·	4.3 km	MPC · JPL
116538	2004 BM_{59}	—	January 24, 2004	Socorro	LINEAR	·	3.0 km	MPC · JPL
116539	2004 BU_{60}	—	January 21, 2004	Socorro	LINEAR	·	4.5 km	MPC · JPL
116540	2004 BH_{61}	—	January 21, 2004	Socorro	LINEAR	THM	5.4 km	MPC · JPL
116541	2004 BQ_{62}	—	January 22, 2004	Socorro	LINEAR	KOR	2.6 km	MPC · JPL
116542	2004 BR_{68}	—	January 27, 2004	Socorro	LINEAR	EUP	7.0 km	MPC · JPL
116543	2004 BZ_{69}	—	January 21, 2004	Socorro	LINEAR	MAS	1.2 km	MPC · JPL
116544	2004 BK_{72}	—	January 23, 2004	Socorro	LINEAR	·	1.4 km	MPC · JPL
116545	2004 BE_{73}	—	January 24, 2004	Socorro	LINEAR	·	3.7 km	MPC · JPL
116546	2004 BW_{73}	—	January 24, 2004	Socorro	LINEAR	·	5.4 km	MPC · JPL
116547	2004 BK_{74}	—	January 24, 2004	Socorro	LINEAR	·	3.2 km	MPC · JPL
116548	2004 BN_{74}	—	January 24, 2004	Socorro	LINEAR	·	1.8 km	MPC · JPL
116549	2004 BR_{74}	—	January 24, 2004	Socorro	LINEAR	·	4.2 km	MPC · JPL
116550	2004 BT_{74}	—	January 24, 2004	Socorro	LINEAR	·	6.2 km	MPC · JPL
116551	2004 BF_{75}	—	January 22, 2004	Socorro	LINEAR	·	3.4 km	MPC · JPL
116552	2004 BH_{75}	—	January 22, 2004	Socorro	LINEAR	·	3.1 km	MPC · JPL
116553	2004 BZ_{75}	—	January 23, 2004	Socorro	LINEAR	HYG ·	5.1 km	MPC · JPL
116554	2004 BY_{76}	—	January 27, 2004	Anderson Mesa	LONEOS	·	7.0 km	MPC · JPL
116555	2004 BK_{78}	—	January 22, 2004	Socorro	LINEAR	·	2.9 km	MPC · JPL
116556	2004 BP_{79}	—	January 22, 2004	Haleakala	NEAT	EUN	2.8 km	MPC · JPL
116557	2004 BC_{80}	—	January 24, 2004	Socorro	LINEAR	THM	4.3 km	MPC · JPL
116558	2004 BH_{82}	—	January 27, 2004	Anderson Mesa	LONEOS	LIX	5.2 km	MPC · JPL
116559	2004 BT_{82}	—	January 23, 2004	Socorro	LINEAR	·	5.0 km	MPC · JPL
116560	2004 BU_{82}	—	January 23, 2004	Socorro	LINEAR	·	2.1 km	MPC · JPL
116561	2004 BV_{82}	—	January 23, 2004	Socorro	LINEAR	·	2.3 km	MPC · JPL
116562	2004 BH_{83}	—	January 23, 2004	Socorro	LINEAR	·	1.1 km	MPC · JPL
116563	2004 BO_{83}	—	January 22, 2004	Socorro	LINEAR	·	6.1 km	MPC · JPL
116564	2004 BA_{84}	—	January 23, 2004	Anderson Mesa	LONEOS	·	3.0 km	MPC · JPL
116565	2004 BN_{84}	—	January 25, 2004	Haleakala	NEAT	EUN	1.8 km	MPC · JPL
116566	2004 BT_{84}	—	January 27, 2004	Anderson Mesa	LONEOS	·	5.8 km	MPC · JPL
116567	2004 BV_{84}	—	January 27, 2004	Socorro	LINEAR	L5	11 km	MPC · JPL
116568	2004 BZ_{84}	—	January 27, 2004	Socorro	LINEAR	·	5.0 km	MPC · JPL
116569	2004 BD_{87}	—	January 22, 2004	Socorro	LINEAR	·	7.1 km	MPC · JPL
116570	2004 BS_{87}	—	January 23, 2004	Anderson Mesa	LONEOS	·	1.2 km	MPC · JPL
116571	2004 BW_{87}	—	January 23, 2004	Socorro	LINEAR	V	1.5 km	MPC · JPL
116572	2004 BD_{88}	—	January 23, 2004	Anderson Mesa	LONEOS	·	4.6 km	MPC · JPL
116573	2004 BZ_{88}	—	January 23, 2004	Socorro	LINEAR	·	1.8 km	MPC · JPL
116574	2004 BY_{90}	—	January 24, 2004	Socorro	LINEAR	NYS	2.9 km	MPC · JPL
116575	2004 BZ_{90}	—	January 24, 2004	Socorro	LINEAR	NYS	1.8 km	MPC · JPL
116576	2004 BA_{91}	—	January 24, 2004	Socorro	LINEAR	NYS	2.2 km	MPC · JPL
116577	2004 BN_{91}	—	January 24, 2004	Socorro	LINEAR	V	1.3 km	MPC · JPL
116578	2004 BB_{92}	—	January 26, 2004	Anderson Mesa	LONEOS	·	2.5 km	MPC · JPL
116579	2004 BD_{92}	—	January 26, 2004	Anderson Mesa	LONEOS	·	5.3 km	MPC · JPL
116580	2004 BX_{92}	—	January 27, 2004	Anderson Mesa	LONEOS	·	3.1 km	MPC · JPL
116581	2004 BZ_{92}	—	January 27, 2004	Anderson Mesa	LONEOS	LIX	7.1 km	MPC · JPL
116582	2004 BD_{93}	—	January 27, 2004	Anderson Mesa	LONEOS	·	2.7 km	MPC · JPL
116583	2004 BJ_{94}	—	January 28, 2004	Socorro	LINEAR	·	2.2 km	MPC · JPL
116584	2004 BZ_{94}	—	January 28, 2004	Socorro	LINEAR	·	3.0 km	MPC · JPL
116585	2004 BX_{95}	—	January 27, 2004	Catalina	CSS	·	5.6 km	MPC · JPL
116586	2004 BK_{97}	—	January 26, 2004	Anderson Mesa	LONEOS	·	2.1 km	MPC · JPL
116587	2004 BO_{97}	—	January 26, 2004	Anderson Mesa	LONEOS	·	5.5 km	MPC · JPL
116588	2004 BJ_{98}	—	January 27, 2004	Kitt Peak	Spacewatch	·	1.5 km	MPC · JPL
116589	2004 BV_{98}	—	January 27, 2004	Kitt Peak	Spacewatch	LIX	5.8 km	MPC · JPL
116590	2004 BK_{100}	—	January 28, 2004	Socorro	LINEAR	·	2.1 km	MPC · JPL
116591	2004 BT_{102}	—	January 29, 2004	Socorro	LINEAR	NYS	2.5 km	MPC · JPL
116592	2004 BF_{103}	—	January 30, 2004	Catalina	CSS	H	1.4 km	MPC · JPL
116593	2004 BA_{104}	—	January 23, 2004	Socorro	LINEAR	·	2.4 km	MPC · JPL
116594	2004 BF_{104}	—	January 23, 2004	Socorro	LINEAR	EUP	6.9 km	MPC · JPL
116595	2004 BL_{104}	—	January 23, 2004	Socorro	LINEAR	·	6.2 km	MPC · JPL
116596	2004 BV_{104}	—	January 24, 2004	Socorro	LINEAR	·	6.1 km	MPC · JPL
116597	2004 BL_{105}	—	January 24, 2004	Socorro	LINEAR	KOR	3.0 km	MPC · JPL
116598	2004 BN_{105}	—	January 24, 2004	Socorro	LINEAR	EOS	4.1 km	MPC · JPL
116599	2004 BG_{106}	—	January 26, 2004	Anderson Mesa	LONEOS	EUN	2.2 km	MPC · JPL
116600	2004 BH_{106}	—	January 26, 2004	Anderson Mesa	LONEOS	·	3.7 km	MPC · JPL

== 116601–116700 ==
back to top

Designation			Discovery			Properties		Ref
Permanent	Provisional	Named after	Date	Site	Discoverer(s)	Category	Diam.	Ref
116601	2004 BP_{106}	—	January 26, 2004	Anderson Mesa	LONEOS	·	5.7 km	MPC · JPL
116602	2004 BS_{107}	—	January 28, 2004	Catalina	CSS	·	3.6 km	MPC · JPL
116603	2004 BJ_{108}	—	January 28, 2004	Catalina	CSS	HOF	4.8 km	MPC · JPL
116604	2004 BQ_{108}	—	January 28, 2004	Catalina	CSS	·	2.9 km	MPC · JPL
116605	2004 BJ_{109}	—	January 28, 2004	Catalina	CSS	·	6.8 km	MPC · JPL
116606	2004 BB_{110}	—	January 28, 2004	Catalina	CSS	·	4.2 km	MPC · JPL
116607	2004 BT_{110}	—	January 28, 2004	Catalina	CSS	·	1.7 km	MPC · JPL
116608	2004 BA_{111}	—	January 29, 2004	Socorro	LINEAR	·	3.1 km	MPC · JPL
116609	2004 BO_{111}	—	January 29, 2004	Catalina	CSS	·	2.3 km	MPC · JPL
116610	2004 BO_{113}	—	January 28, 2004	Socorro	LINEAR	·	2.3 km	MPC · JPL
116611	2004 BZ_{113}	—	January 29, 2004	Socorro	LINEAR	·	1.4 km	MPC · JPL
116612	2004 BE_{114}	—	January 29, 2004	Socorro	LINEAR	·	6.0 km	MPC · JPL
116613	2004 BR_{114}	—	January 29, 2004	Anderson Mesa	LONEOS	V	1.5 km	MPC · JPL
116614	2004 BT_{114}	—	January 29, 2004	Anderson Mesa	LONEOS	V	1.2 km	MPC · JPL
116615	2004 BA_{115}	—	January 30, 2004	Catalina	CSS	H	1.1 km	MPC · JPL
116616	2004 BH_{115}	—	January 30, 2004	Catalina	CSS	·	5.9 km	MPC · JPL
116617	2004 BJ_{115}	—	January 30, 2004	Catalina	CSS	AEG	7.4 km	MPC · JPL
116618	2004 BU_{116}	—	January 27, 2004	Catalina	CSS	·	8.3 km	MPC · JPL
116619	2004 BY_{117}	—	January 29, 2004	Socorro	LINEAR	fast	3.1 km	MPC · JPL
116620	2004 BC_{118}	—	January 29, 2004	Socorro	LINEAR	PHO	3.6 km	MPC · JPL
116621	2004 BG_{118}	—	January 29, 2004	Socorro	LINEAR	·	1.2 km	MPC · JPL
116622	2004 BM_{118}	—	January 29, 2004	Catalina	CSS	·	6.4 km	MPC · JPL
116623	2004 BN_{118}	—	January 29, 2004	Catalina	CSS	V	1.2 km	MPC · JPL
116624	2004 BR_{118}	—	January 30, 2004	Anderson Mesa	LONEOS	·	3.1 km	MPC · JPL
116625	2004 BT_{118}	—	January 30, 2004	Catalina	CSS	·	9.6 km	MPC · JPL
116626	2004 BJ_{119}	—	January 30, 2004	Anderson Mesa	LONEOS	·	4.2 km	MPC · JPL
116627	2004 BB_{121}	—	January 31, 2004	Socorro	LINEAR	·	6.4 km	MPC · JPL
116628	2004 BB_{122}	—	January 28, 2004	Socorro	LINEAR	EUP	9.4 km	MPC · JPL
116629	2004 BD_{122}	—	January 30, 2004	Catalina	CSS	TIR · slow	5.4 km	MPC · JPL
116630	2004 BD_{124}	—	January 18, 2004	Palomar	NEAT	·	5.7 km	MPC · JPL
116631	2004 BK_{124}	—	January 16, 2004	Palomar	NEAT	·	2.4 km	MPC · JPL
116632	2004 BQ_{141}	—	January 19, 2004	Kitt Peak	Spacewatch	·	4.2 km	MPC · JPL
116633	2004 BV_{147}	—	January 16, 2004	Palomar	NEAT	KOR	2.5 km	MPC · JPL
116634	2004 BM_{150}	—	January 17, 2004	Palomar	NEAT	KOR	2.4 km	MPC · JPL
116635	2004 BT_{151}	—	January 18, 2004	Palomar	NEAT	·	3.2 km	MPC · JPL
116636	2004 BC_{152}	—	January 19, 2004	Anderson Mesa	LONEOS	·	2.6 km	MPC · JPL
116637	2004 BR_{155}	—	January 28, 2004	Catalina	CSS	·	4.1 km	MPC · JPL
116638	2004 CD	—	February 2, 2004	Catalina	CSS	EUP	7.5 km	MPC · JPL
116639	2004 CF	—	February 2, 2004	Catalina	CSS	HNS	3.0 km	MPC · JPL
116640	2004 CK_{1}	—	February 10, 2004	Socorro	LINEAR	·	4.4 km	MPC · JPL
116641	2004 CL_{3}	—	February 10, 2004	Palomar	NEAT	EUN	2.5 km	MPC · JPL
116642	2004 CU_{3}	—	February 10, 2004	Palomar	NEAT	·	1.0 km	MPC · JPL
116643	2004 CB_{4}	—	February 10, 2004	Palomar	NEAT	·	2.9 km	MPC · JPL
116644	2004 CV_{11}	—	February 11, 2004	Palomar	NEAT	·	4.5 km	MPC · JPL
116645	2004 CT_{12}	—	February 11, 2004	Palomar	NEAT	·	1.8 km	MPC · JPL
116646	2004 CN_{13}	—	February 11, 2004	Anderson Mesa	LONEOS	NYS	1.9 km	MPC · JPL
116647	2004 CY_{13}	—	February 11, 2004	Anderson Mesa	LONEOS	·	1.9 km	MPC · JPL
116648	2004 CA_{14}	—	February 11, 2004	Anderson Mesa	LONEOS	·	2.3 km	MPC · JPL
116649	2004 CY_{17}	—	February 10, 2004	Catalina	CSS	·	2.4 km	MPC · JPL
116650	2004 CL_{21}	—	February 11, 2004	Anderson Mesa	LONEOS	·	2.8 km	MPC · JPL
116651	2004 CL_{24}	—	February 12, 2004	Nogales	Tenagra II	·	3.6 km	MPC · JPL
116652	2004 CX_{24}	—	February 12, 2004	Palomar	NEAT	·	1.5 km	MPC · JPL
116653	2004 CJ_{29}	—	February 12, 2004	Kitt Peak	Spacewatch	KOR	2.4 km	MPC · JPL
116654	2004 CV_{30}	—	February 12, 2004	Kitt Peak	Spacewatch	·	4.8 km	MPC · JPL
116655	2004 CW_{33}	—	February 12, 2004	Kitt Peak	Spacewatch	·	1.7 km	MPC · JPL
116656	2004 CY_{35}	—	February 11, 2004	Palomar	NEAT	·	1.5 km	MPC · JPL
116657	2004 CM_{36}	—	February 12, 2004	Kitt Peak	Spacewatch	·	5.3 km	MPC · JPL
116658	2004 CR_{36}	—	February 12, 2004	Palomar	NEAT	·	3.1 km	MPC · JPL
116659	2004 CW_{36}	—	February 12, 2004	Desert Eagle	W. K. Y. Yeung	·	3.4 km	MPC · JPL
116660	2004 CV_{37}	—	February 13, 2004	Desert Eagle	W. K. Y. Yeung	·	1.7 km	MPC · JPL
116661	2004 CU_{38}	—	February 10, 2004	Catalina	CSS	·	3.7 km	MPC · JPL
116662	2004 CW_{39}	—	February 12, 2004	Desert Eagle	W. K. Y. Yeung	·	4.8 km	MPC · JPL
116663	2004 CJ_{40}	—	February 11, 2004	Palomar	NEAT	·	3.6 km	MPC · JPL
116664	2004 CL_{40}	—	February 12, 2004	Kitt Peak	Spacewatch	V	1.3 km	MPC · JPL
116665	2004 CM_{40}	—	February 12, 2004	Palomar	NEAT	·	3.0 km	MPC · JPL
116666	2004 CQ_{40}	—	February 12, 2004	Kitt Peak	Spacewatch	·	2.8 km	MPC · JPL
116667	2004 CN_{41}	—	February 14, 2004	Palomar	NEAT	TIR	6.2 km	MPC · JPL
116668	2004 CQ_{42}	—	February 11, 2004	Kitt Peak	Spacewatch	·	1.3 km	MPC · JPL
116669	2004 CQ_{46}	—	February 13, 2004	Kitt Peak	Spacewatch	·	3.0 km	MPC · JPL
116670	2004 CK_{49}	—	February 15, 2004	Haleakala	NEAT	·	4.7 km	MPC · JPL
116671	2004 CQ_{53}	—	February 11, 2004	Kitt Peak	Spacewatch	·	2.7 km	MPC · JPL
116672	2004 CZ_{56}	—	February 10, 2004	Palomar	NEAT	PHO	2.3 km	MPC · JPL
116673	2004 CP_{60}	—	February 11, 2004	Palomar	NEAT	·	1.5 km	MPC · JPL
116674	2004 CX_{61}	—	February 11, 2004	Kitt Peak	Spacewatch	·	2.2 km	MPC · JPL
116675	2004 CH_{65}	—	February 14, 2004	Kitt Peak	Spacewatch	·	3.4 km	MPC · JPL
116676	2004 CC_{66}	—	February 15, 2004	Socorro	LINEAR	·	2.7 km	MPC · JPL
116677	2004 CT_{67}	—	February 10, 2004	Catalina	CSS	·	2.0 km	MPC · JPL
116678	2004 CX_{67}	—	February 10, 2004	Palomar	NEAT	MAS	1.2 km	MPC · JPL
116679	2004 CH_{69}	—	February 11, 2004	Kitt Peak	Spacewatch	·	2.1 km	MPC · JPL
116680	2004 CK_{69}	—	February 11, 2004	Palomar	NEAT	·	2.7 km	MPC · JPL
116681	2004 CF_{70}	—	February 11, 2004	Palomar	NEAT	·	6.3 km	MPC · JPL
116682	2004 CW_{70}	—	February 12, 2004	Kitt Peak	Spacewatch	·	1.1 km	MPC · JPL
116683	2004 CY_{71}	—	February 13, 2004	Palomar	NEAT	EOS	4.7 km	MPC · JPL
116684	2004 CO_{72}	—	February 13, 2004	Kitt Peak	Spacewatch	·	2.5 km	MPC · JPL
116685	2004 CG_{77}	—	February 11, 2004	Palomar	NEAT	·	3.3 km	MPC · JPL
116686	2004 CM_{77}	—	February 11, 2004	Palomar	NEAT	KOR	2.3 km	MPC · JPL
116687	2004 CE_{78}	—	February 11, 2004	Anderson Mesa	LONEOS	NYS	2.7 km	MPC · JPL
116688	2004 CC_{80}	—	February 11, 2004	Palomar	NEAT	NYS	3.0 km	MPC · JPL
116689	2004 CB_{83}	—	February 12, 2004	Kitt Peak	Spacewatch	·	2.0 km	MPC · JPL
116690	2004 CM_{83}	—	February 12, 2004	Kitt Peak	Spacewatch	·	6.2 km	MPC · JPL
116691	2004 CW_{83}	—	February 12, 2004	Kitt Peak	Spacewatch	·	1.6 km	MPC · JPL
116692	2004 CZ_{84}	—	February 13, 2004	Kitt Peak	Spacewatch	·	4.8 km	MPC · JPL
116693	2004 CD_{85}	—	February 13, 2004	Kitt Peak	Spacewatch	MAR	1.7 km	MPC · JPL
116694	2004 CW_{85}	—	February 14, 2004	Kitt Peak	Spacewatch	·	8.2 km	MPC · JPL
116695	2004 CQ_{91}	—	February 13, 2004	Palomar	NEAT	·	11 km	MPC · JPL
116696	2004 CH_{92}	—	February 14, 2004	Socorro	LINEAR	V	1.2 km	MPC · JPL
116697	2004 CO_{92}	—	February 14, 2004	Haleakala	NEAT	·	2.1 km	MPC · JPL
116698	2004 CZ_{97}	—	February 14, 2004	Socorro	LINEAR	·	2.9 km	MPC · JPL
116699	2004 CP_{98}	—	February 14, 2004	Catalina	CSS	·	3.7 km	MPC · JPL
116700	2004 CW_{99}	—	February 15, 2004	Catalina	CSS	·	5.8 km	MPC · JPL

== 116701–116800 ==
back to top

Designation			Discovery			Properties		Ref
Permanent	Provisional	Named after	Date	Site	Discoverer(s)	Category	Diam.	Ref
116701	2004 CJ_{101}	—	February 15, 2004	Catalina	CSS	·	2.2 km	MPC · JPL
116702	2004 CM_{101}	—	February 12, 2004	Palomar	NEAT	·	3.0 km	MPC · JPL
116703	2004 CS_{101}	—	February 12, 2004	Palomar	NEAT	·	2.9 km	MPC · JPL
116704	2004 CZ_{101}	—	February 12, 2004	Palomar	NEAT	·	5.4 km	MPC · JPL
116705	2004 CO_{102}	—	February 12, 2004	Palomar	NEAT	·	3.7 km	MPC · JPL
116706	2004 CR_{102}	—	February 12, 2004	Palomar	NEAT	ADE	3.8 km	MPC · JPL
116707	2004 CD_{107}	—	February 14, 2004	Palomar	NEAT	·	2.5 km	MPC · JPL
116708	2004 CE_{113}	—	February 13, 2004	Anderson Mesa	LONEOS	·	3.0 km	MPC · JPL
116709	2004 CS_{113}	—	February 13, 2004	Anderson Mesa	LONEOS	·	3.8 km	MPC · JPL
116710	2004 CF_{114}	—	February 13, 2004	Anderson Mesa	LONEOS	·	2.8 km	MPC · JPL
116711	2004 DY_{3}	—	February 16, 2004	Socorro	LINEAR	EOS	3.2 km	MPC · JPL
116712	2004 DX_{4}	—	February 16, 2004	Socorro	LINEAR	·	6.3 km	MPC · JPL
116713	2004 DZ_{4}	—	February 16, 2004	Socorro	LINEAR	·	4.1 km	MPC · JPL
116714	2004 DO_{6}	—	February 16, 2004	Kitt Peak	Spacewatch	·	4.3 km	MPC · JPL
116715	2004 DQ_{6}	—	February 16, 2004	Kitt Peak	Spacewatch	·	3.5 km	MPC · JPL
116716	2004 DM_{7}	—	February 17, 2004	Desert Eagle	W. K. Y. Yeung	·	7.5 km	MPC · JPL
116717	2004 DU_{8}	—	February 17, 2004	Kitt Peak	Spacewatch	·	2.1 km	MPC · JPL
116718	2004 DV_{8}	—	February 17, 2004	Kitt Peak	Spacewatch	MAS	1.5 km	MPC · JPL
116719	2004 DN_{10}	—	February 18, 2004	Desert Eagle	W. K. Y. Yeung	·	1.6 km	MPC · JPL
116720	2004 DG_{11}	—	February 16, 2004	Kitt Peak	Spacewatch	MAS	1.2 km	MPC · JPL
116721	2004 DT_{11}	—	February 17, 2004	Kitt Peak	Spacewatch	·	2.8 km	MPC · JPL
116722	2004 DS_{12}	—	February 16, 2004	Catalina	CSS	·	1.3 km	MPC · JPL
116723	2004 DC_{13}	—	February 16, 2004	Catalina	CSS	·	2.0 km	MPC · JPL
116724	2004 DE_{13}	—	February 16, 2004	Catalina	CSS	·	4.0 km	MPC · JPL
116725	2004 DG_{13}	—	February 16, 2004	Catalina	CSS	·	3.2 km	MPC · JPL
116726	2004 DK_{14}	—	February 16, 2004	Catalina	CSS	·	2.2 km	MPC · JPL
116727	2004 DL_{16}	—	February 17, 2004	Haleakala	NEAT	·	2.3 km	MPC · JPL
116728	2004 DZ_{20}	—	February 17, 2004	Catalina	CSS	·	3.1 km	MPC · JPL
116729	2004 DR_{22}	—	February 18, 2004	Socorro	LINEAR	·	4.8 km	MPC · JPL
116730	2004 DC_{23}	—	February 18, 2004	Catalina	CSS	HNS	2.4 km	MPC · JPL
116731	2004 DC_{24}	—	February 19, 2004	Socorro	LINEAR	·	1.5 km	MPC · JPL
116732	2004 DO_{24}	—	February 19, 2004	Socorro	LINEAR	NYS	1.8 km	MPC · JPL
116733	2004 DY_{25}	—	February 16, 2004	Socorro	LINEAR	·	5.6 km	MPC · JPL
116734	2004 DD_{34}	—	February 18, 2004	Catalina	CSS	V	1.3 km	MPC · JPL
116735	2004 DD_{37}	—	February 19, 2004	Socorro	LINEAR	·	4.6 km	MPC · JPL
116736	2004 DE_{37}	—	February 19, 2004	Socorro	LINEAR	·	1.9 km	MPC · JPL
116737	2004 DC_{38}	—	February 19, 2004	Socorro	LINEAR	ADE	5.1 km	MPC · JPL
116738	2004 DT_{41}	—	February 19, 2004	Socorro	LINEAR	·	1.6 km	MPC · JPL
116739	2004 DX_{41}	—	February 19, 2004	Socorro	LINEAR	V	1.3 km	MPC · JPL
116740	2004 DA_{45}	—	February 19, 2004	Socorro	LINEAR	H	880 m	MPC · JPL
116741	2004 DR_{45}	—	February 26, 2004	Desert Eagle	W. K. Y. Yeung	·	2.1 km	MPC · JPL
116742	2004 DV_{47}	—	February 19, 2004	Socorro	LINEAR	·	3.7 km	MPC · JPL
116743	2004 DB_{48}	—	February 19, 2004	Socorro	LINEAR	·	2.3 km	MPC · JPL
116744	2004 DD_{48}	—	February 19, 2004	Socorro	LINEAR	V	1.3 km	MPC · JPL
116745	2004 DO_{48}	—	February 19, 2004	Socorro	LINEAR	·	2.0 km	MPC · JPL
116746	2004 DC_{49}	—	February 19, 2004	Socorro	LINEAR	·	2.1 km	MPC · JPL
116747	2004 DC_{51}	—	February 23, 2004	Socorro	LINEAR	·	1.7 km	MPC · JPL
116748	2004 DX_{51}	—	February 23, 2004	Socorro	LINEAR	GEF	2.0 km	MPC · JPL
116749	2004 DE_{52}	—	February 25, 2004	Socorro	LINEAR	·	1.2 km	MPC · JPL
116750	2004 DG_{52}	—	February 25, 2004	Socorro	LINEAR	·	2.1 km	MPC · JPL
116751	2004 DT_{52}	—	February 25, 2004	Socorro	LINEAR	·	2.1 km	MPC · JPL
116752	2004 DZ_{52}	—	February 25, 2004	Socorro	LINEAR	·	1.9 km	MPC · JPL
116753	2004 DD_{60}	—	February 26, 2004	Socorro	LINEAR	NYS	2.4 km	MPC · JPL
116754	2004 DT_{60}	—	February 26, 2004	Socorro	LINEAR	·	1.3 km	MPC · JPL
116755	2004 DG_{66}	—	February 23, 2004	Socorro	LINEAR	V	1.2 km	MPC · JPL
116756	2004 DV_{74}	—	February 17, 2004	Kitt Peak	Spacewatch	·	3.0 km	MPC · JPL
116757	2004 EF_{1}	—	March 14, 2004	Socorro	LINEAR	H	1.2 km	MPC · JPL
116758	2004 EA_{3}	—	March 10, 2004	Palomar	NEAT	·	1.5 km	MPC · JPL
116759	2004 EH_{4}	—	March 11, 2004	Palomar	NEAT	PHO	3.3 km	MPC · JPL
116760	2004 EF_{5}	—	March 11, 2004	Palomar	NEAT	·	4.5 km	MPC · JPL
116761	2004 ED_{6}	—	March 12, 2004	Palomar	NEAT	·	1.5 km	MPC · JPL
116762	2004 ER_{7}	—	March 12, 2004	Palomar	NEAT	·	5.4 km	MPC · JPL
116763	2004 EW_{7}	—	March 13, 2004	Palomar	NEAT	(116763)	3.0 km	MPC · JPL
116764	2004 EO_{8}	—	March 13, 2004	Palomar	NEAT	(2076)	2.2 km	MPC · JPL
116765	2004 ES_{8}	—	March 13, 2004	Palomar	NEAT	V	1.1 km	MPC · JPL
116766	2004 EJ_{10}	—	March 14, 2004	Kitt Peak	Spacewatch	·	2.1 km	MPC · JPL
116767	2004 ET_{11}	—	March 10, 2004	Haleakala	NEAT	·	3.9 km	MPC · JPL
116768	2004 EE_{13}	—	March 11, 2004	Palomar	NEAT	·	1.2 km	MPC · JPL
116769	2004 EN_{14}	—	March 11, 2004	Palomar	NEAT	·	2.8 km	MPC · JPL
116770	2004 ED_{15}	—	March 11, 2004	Palomar	NEAT	·	2.7 km	MPC · JPL
116771	2004 EN_{17}	—	March 12, 2004	Palomar	NEAT	·	3.0 km	MPC · JPL
116772	2004 EP_{17}	—	March 12, 2004	Palomar	NEAT	·	4.9 km	MPC · JPL
116773	2004 ED_{18}	—	March 12, 2004	Palomar	NEAT	EUN	2.1 km	MPC · JPL
116774	2004 EV_{18}	—	March 14, 2004	Catalina	CSS	EOS	4.6 km	MPC · JPL
116775	2004 EW_{21}	—	March 15, 2004	Desert Eagle	W. K. Y. Yeung	·	1.4 km	MPC · JPL
116776	2004 ED_{22}	—	March 14, 2004	Catalina	CSS	·	3.3 km	MPC · JPL
116777	2004 EJ_{22}	—	March 15, 2004	Goodricke-Pigott	Goodricke-Pigott	·	5.6 km	MPC · JPL
116778	2004 EY_{25}	—	March 13, 2004	Palomar	NEAT	615	2.5 km	MPC · JPL
116779	2004 EM_{29}	—	March 15, 2004	Kitt Peak	Spacewatch	·	2.4 km	MPC · JPL
116780	2004 EH_{31}	—	March 13, 2004	Palomar	NEAT	·	2.4 km	MPC · JPL
116781	2004 EL_{31}	—	March 14, 2004	Palomar	NEAT	·	2.5 km	MPC · JPL
116782	2004 EV_{31}	—	March 14, 2004	Palomar	NEAT	·	2.2 km	MPC · JPL
116783	2004 EW_{31}	—	March 14, 2004	Palomar	NEAT	·	2.2 km	MPC · JPL
116784	2004 EC_{34}	—	March 12, 2004	Palomar	NEAT	3:2	8.8 km	MPC · JPL
116785	2004 EJ_{34}	—	March 12, 2004	Palomar	NEAT	·	3.1 km	MPC · JPL
116786	2004 EN_{34}	—	March 12, 2004	Palomar	NEAT	·	1.8 km	MPC · JPL
116787	2004 EX_{34}	—	March 12, 2004	Palomar	NEAT	·	1.6 km	MPC · JPL
116788	2004 EJ_{35}	—	March 12, 2004	Palomar	NEAT	·	2.4 km	MPC · JPL
116789	2004 EU_{38}	—	March 14, 2004	Kitt Peak	Spacewatch	TIR	2.8 km	MPC · JPL
116790	2004 EX_{38}	—	March 14, 2004	Catalina	CSS	(2076)	3.0 km	MPC · JPL
116791	2004 EZ_{40}	—	March 15, 2004	Kitt Peak	Spacewatch	·	2.6 km	MPC · JPL
116792	2004 ER_{42}	—	March 15, 2004	Catalina	CSS	·	2.4 km	MPC · JPL
116793	2004 EJ_{43}	—	March 15, 2004	Kitt Peak	Spacewatch	EOS	4.1 km	MPC · JPL
116794	2004 EK_{43}	—	March 15, 2004	Socorro	LINEAR	·	6.4 km	MPC · JPL
116795	2004 ER_{47}	—	March 15, 2004	Catalina	CSS	·	3.9 km	MPC · JPL
116796	2004 EZ_{48}	—	March 15, 2004	Kitt Peak	Spacewatch	(2076)	1.5 km	MPC · JPL
116797	2004 EC_{57}	—	March 15, 2004	Palomar	NEAT	·	3.5 km	MPC · JPL
116798	2004 EN_{59}	—	March 15, 2004	Palomar	NEAT	·	4.1 km	MPC · JPL
116799	2004 EQ_{59}	—	March 15, 2004	Palomar	NEAT	BRG	2.9 km	MPC · JPL
116800	2004 ED_{60}	—	March 15, 2004	Palomar	NEAT	PHO	1.7 km	MPC · JPL

== 116801–116900 ==
back to top

Designation			Discovery			Properties		Ref
Permanent	Provisional	Named after	Date	Site	Discoverer(s)	Category	Diam.	Ref
116801	2004 ES_{63}	—	March 13, 2004	Palomar	NEAT	V	950 m	MPC · JPL
116802	2004 EJ_{66}	—	March 14, 2004	Socorro	LINEAR	·	7.7 km	MPC · JPL
116803	2004 EJ_{68}	—	March 15, 2004	Socorro	LINEAR	·	2.8 km	MPC · JPL
116804	2004 EJ_{70}	—	March 15, 2004	Kitt Peak	Spacewatch	·	2.8 km	MPC · JPL
116805	2004 EP_{71}	—	March 15, 2004	Catalina	CSS	·	3.1 km	MPC · JPL
116806	2004 EB_{73}	—	March 15, 2004	Catalina	CSS	·	2.1 km	MPC · JPL
116807	2004 EC_{73}	—	March 15, 2004	Catalina	CSS	·	2.7 km	MPC · JPL
116808	2004 ED_{73}	—	March 15, 2004	Catalina	CSS	·	1.9 km	MPC · JPL
116809	2004 EV_{73}	—	March 15, 2004	Kitt Peak	Spacewatch	·	2.4 km	MPC · JPL
116810	2004 EX_{76}	—	March 15, 2004	Catalina	CSS	·	2.5 km	MPC · JPL
116811	2004 EP_{77}	—	March 15, 2004	Socorro	LINEAR	NYS	2.9 km	MPC · JPL
116812	2004 EV_{77}	—	March 15, 2004	Socorro	LINEAR	·	3.5 km	MPC · JPL
116813	2004 EA_{80}	—	March 14, 2004	Socorro	LINEAR	·	2.2 km	MPC · JPL
116814	2004 EM_{80}	—	March 14, 2004	Socorro	LINEAR	·	6.3 km	MPC · JPL
116815	2004 EQ_{80}	—	March 14, 2004	Socorro	LINEAR	PHO	2.4 km	MPC · JPL
116816	2004 EY_{83}	—	March 14, 2004	Palomar	NEAT	·	1.5 km	MPC · JPL
116817	2004 ER_{86}	—	March 15, 2004	Kitt Peak	Spacewatch	·	1.4 km	MPC · JPL
116818	2004 ER_{94}	—	March 15, 2004	Socorro	LINEAR	·	5.2 km	MPC · JPL
116819	2004 FM	—	March 16, 2004	Socorro	LINEAR	H	1.5 km	MPC · JPL
116820	2004 FO	—	March 16, 2004	Catalina	CSS	H	1.2 km	MPC · JPL
116821	2004 FF_{12}	—	March 16, 2004	Catalina	CSS	KON	4.1 km	MPC · JPL
116822	2004 FR_{12}	—	March 16, 2004	Catalina	CSS	·	2.4 km	MPC · JPL
116823	2004 FY_{12}	—	March 16, 2004	Catalina	CSS	V	1.2 km	MPC · JPL
116824	2004 FT_{14}	—	March 16, 2004	Catalina	CSS	·	1.3 km	MPC · JPL
116825	2004 FG_{15}	—	March 16, 2004	Kitt Peak	Spacewatch	·	4.1 km	MPC · JPL
116826	2004 FA_{16}	—	March 26, 2004	Socorro	LINEAR	H	1.3 km	MPC · JPL
116827	2004 FT_{17}	—	March 26, 2004	Socorro	LINEAR	H	1.1 km	MPC · JPL
116828	2004 FD_{21}	—	March 16, 2004	Socorro	LINEAR	MAR	2.0 km	MPC · JPL
116829	2004 FV_{25}	—	March 17, 2004	Socorro	LINEAR	·	2.1 km	MPC · JPL
116830	2004 FU_{26}	—	March 17, 2004	Socorro	LINEAR	·	7.1 km	MPC · JPL
116831	2004 FA_{31}	—	March 29, 2004	Socorro	LINEAR	BRU	7.2 km	MPC · JPL
116832	2004 FR_{32}	—	March 16, 2004	Kitt Peak	Spacewatch	VER	6.0 km	MPC · JPL
116833	2004 FB_{35}	—	March 16, 2004	Kitt Peak	Spacewatch	EUN · slow	3.4 km	MPC · JPL
116834	2004 FB_{36}	—	March 16, 2004	Socorro	LINEAR	·	2.8 km	MPC · JPL
116835	2004 FL_{36}	—	March 16, 2004	Socorro	LINEAR	AGN	2.5 km	MPC · JPL
116836	2004 FL_{38}	—	March 17, 2004	Socorro	LINEAR	·	2.2 km	MPC · JPL
116837	2004 FZ_{38}	—	March 17, 2004	Socorro	LINEAR	·	1.8 km	MPC · JPL
116838	2004 FA_{39}	—	March 17, 2004	Socorro	LINEAR	·	1.8 km	MPC · JPL
116839	2004 FO_{39}	—	March 17, 2004	Socorro	LINEAR	·	5.6 km	MPC · JPL
116840	2004 FP_{39}	—	March 17, 2004	Socorro	LINEAR	·	3.6 km	MPC · JPL
116841	2004 FQ_{39}	—	March 17, 2004	Catalina	CSS	·	1.6 km	MPC · JPL
116842	2004 FN_{42}	—	March 18, 2004	Kitt Peak	Spacewatch	·	3.4 km	MPC · JPL
116843	2004 FH_{45}	—	March 16, 2004	Socorro	LINEAR	slow	1.9 km	MPC · JPL
116844	2004 FR_{48}	—	March 18, 2004	Socorro	LINEAR	V	1.4 km	MPC · JPL
116845	2004 FY_{48}	—	March 18, 2004	Socorro	LINEAR	·	3.3 km	MPC · JPL
116846	2004 FE_{49}	—	March 18, 2004	Socorro	LINEAR	·	1.3 km	MPC · JPL
116847	2004 FN_{51}	—	March 19, 2004	Palomar	NEAT	·	1.5 km	MPC · JPL
116848	2004 FE_{52}	—	March 19, 2004	Socorro	LINEAR	JUN	1.3 km	MPC · JPL
116849	2004 FN_{55}	—	March 19, 2004	Socorro	LINEAR	·	4.1 km	MPC · JPL
116850	2004 FS_{60}	—	March 18, 2004	Kitt Peak	Spacewatch	·	3.8 km	MPC · JPL
116851	2004 FJ_{64}	—	March 19, 2004	Socorro	LINEAR	·	1.4 km	MPC · JPL
116852	2004 FL_{65}	—	March 19, 2004	Socorro	LINEAR	·	2.3 km	MPC · JPL
116853	2004 FN_{65}	—	March 19, 2004	Socorro	LINEAR	·	2.4 km	MPC · JPL
116854	2004 FW_{65}	—	March 19, 2004	Socorro	LINEAR	·	2.5 km	MPC · JPL
116855	2004 FW_{66}	—	March 20, 2004	Socorro	LINEAR	V	1.4 km	MPC · JPL
116856	2004 FV_{76}	—	March 18, 2004	Socorro	LINEAR	·	2.7 km	MPC · JPL
116857	2004 FC_{78}	—	March 19, 2004	Socorro	LINEAR	(17392)	2.6 km	MPC · JPL
116858	2004 FZ_{84}	—	March 18, 2004	Kitt Peak	Spacewatch	·	2.5 km	MPC · JPL
116859	2004 FB_{90}	—	March 20, 2004	Socorro	LINEAR	·	3.0 km	MPC · JPL
116860	2004 FM_{90}	—	March 20, 2004	Socorro	LINEAR	·	3.9 km	MPC · JPL
116861	2004 FR_{90}	—	March 20, 2004	Siding Spring	SSS	·	5.4 km	MPC · JPL
116862	2004 FZ_{91}	—	March 23, 2004	Socorro	LINEAR	·	1.5 km	MPC · JPL
116863	2004 FK_{92}	—	March 18, 2004	Socorro	LINEAR	·	1.3 km	MPC · JPL
116864	2004 FG_{93}	—	March 20, 2004	Socorro	LINEAR	·	4.7 km	MPC · JPL
116865	2004 FE_{98}	—	March 23, 2004	Socorro	LINEAR	PHO	2.3 km	MPC · JPL
116866	2004 FA_{99}	—	March 20, 2004	Socorro	LINEAR	·	1.4 km	MPC · JPL
116867	2004 FF_{105}	—	March 24, 2004	Anderson Mesa	LONEOS	·	1.3 km	MPC · JPL
116868	2004 FG_{105}	—	March 24, 2004	Siding Spring	SSS	HNS	2.5 km	MPC · JPL
116869	2004 FJ_{105}	—	March 24, 2004	Siding Spring	SSS	·	6.8 km	MPC · JPL
116870	2004 FR_{105}	—	March 25, 2004	Socorro	LINEAR	·	4.3 km	MPC · JPL
116871	2004 FM_{107}	—	March 20, 2004	Socorro	LINEAR	·	4.6 km	MPC · JPL
116872	2004 FJ_{108}	—	March 23, 2004	Kitt Peak	Spacewatch	MAS	1.3 km	MPC · JPL
116873	2004 FP_{108}	—	March 23, 2004	Kitt Peak	Spacewatch	·	3.3 km	MPC · JPL
116874	2004 FZ_{109}	—	March 24, 2004	Anderson Mesa	LONEOS	·	4.8 km	MPC · JPL
116875	2004 FJ_{110}	—	March 24, 2004	Anderson Mesa	LONEOS	·	1.3 km	MPC · JPL
116876	2004 FQ_{110}	—	March 25, 2004	Anderson Mesa	LONEOS	·	3.1 km	MPC · JPL
116877	2004 FV_{111}	—	March 26, 2004	Socorro	LINEAR	·	1.7 km	MPC · JPL
116878	2004 FX_{114}	—	March 21, 2004	Kitt Peak	Spacewatch	·	2.5 km	MPC · JPL
116879	2004 FZ_{114}	—	March 21, 2004	Kitt Peak	Spacewatch	KOR	2.4 km	MPC · JPL
116880	2004 FB_{116}	—	March 23, 2004	Socorro	LINEAR	LIX	8.8 km	MPC · JPL
116881	2004 FT_{116}	—	March 23, 2004	Socorro	LINEAR	LIX	7.8 km	MPC · JPL
116882	2004 FO_{118}	—	March 22, 2004	Socorro	LINEAR	EOS	3.7 km	MPC · JPL
116883	2004 FW_{120}	—	March 23, 2004	Socorro	LINEAR	THB	6.1 km	MPC · JPL
116884	2004 FY_{121}	—	March 24, 2004	Anderson Mesa	LONEOS	PHO	5.5 km	MPC · JPL
116885	2004 FH_{122}	—	March 25, 2004	Anderson Mesa	LONEOS	·	5.3 km	MPC · JPL
116886	2004 FQ_{122}	—	March 26, 2004	Socorro	LINEAR	(194)	3.6 km	MPC · JPL
116887	2004 FK_{123}	—	March 26, 2004	Kitt Peak	Spacewatch	·	1.5 km	MPC · JPL
116888	2004 FW_{123}	—	March 26, 2004	Catalina	CSS	·	4.7 km	MPC · JPL
116889	2004 FB_{126}	—	March 27, 2004	Socorro	LINEAR	MAR	2.1 km	MPC · JPL
116890	2004 FT_{126}	—	March 27, 2004	Socorro	LINEAR	·	2.7 km	MPC · JPL
116891	2004 FS_{128}	—	March 27, 2004	Catalina	CSS	·	6.1 km	MPC · JPL
116892	2004 FF_{132}	—	March 23, 2004	Kitt Peak	Spacewatch	·	1.6 km	MPC · JPL
116893	2004 FC_{137}	—	March 28, 2004	Socorro	LINEAR	DOR	4.8 km	MPC · JPL
116894	2004 FA_{139}	—	March 19, 2004	Socorro	LINEAR	THB	6.5 km	MPC · JPL
116895	2004 FP_{139}	—	March 25, 2004	Anderson Mesa	LONEOS	·	3.3 km	MPC · JPL
116896	2004 FQ_{139}	—	March 25, 2004	Anderson Mesa	LONEOS	·	3.6 km	MPC · JPL
116897	2004 FB_{140}	—	March 26, 2004	Anderson Mesa	LONEOS	ADE	4.0 km	MPC · JPL
116898	2004 FF_{140}	—	March 26, 2004	Kitt Peak	Spacewatch	·	3.2 km	MPC · JPL
116899	2004 FB_{142}	—	March 27, 2004	Socorro	LINEAR	·	1.7 km	MPC · JPL
116900	2004 FO_{143}	—	March 28, 2004	Socorro	LINEAR	PHO	3.2 km	MPC · JPL

== 116901–117000 ==
back to top

Designation			Discovery			Properties		Ref
Permanent	Provisional	Named after	Date	Site	Discoverer(s)	Category	Diam.	Ref
116901	2004 FX_{147}	—	March 16, 2004	Kitt Peak	Spacewatch	L4	20 km	MPC · JPL
116902	2004 FR_{160}	—	March 18, 2004	Socorro	LINEAR	·	3.9 km	MPC · JPL
116903 Jeromeapt	2004 GW	Jeromeapt	April 11, 2004	Wrightwood	J. W. Young	MAS	970 m	MPC · JPL
116904	2004 GB_{1}	—	April 8, 2004	Palomar	NEAT	PHO	1.9 km	MPC · JPL
116905	2004 GE_{1}	—	April 9, 2004	Palomar	NEAT	·	4.3 km	MPC · JPL
116906	2004 GV_{1}	—	April 11, 2004	Catalina	CSS	·	1.1 km	MPC · JPL
116907	2004 GF_{2}	—	April 10, 2004	Reedy Creek	J. Broughton	PHO	2.1 km	MPC · JPL
116908	2004 GT_{2}	—	April 12, 2004	Socorro	LINEAR	T_{j} (2.83)	6.0 km	MPC · JPL
116909	2004 GG_{3}	—	April 9, 2004	Siding Spring	SSS	·	2.1 km	MPC · JPL
116910	2004 GR_{9}	—	April 10, 2004	Palomar	NEAT	·	2.3 km	MPC · JPL
116911	2004 GY_{10}	—	April 8, 2004	Palomar	NEAT	·	5.0 km	MPC · JPL
116912	2004 GF_{11}	—	April 12, 2004	Siding Spring	SSS	·	3.6 km	MPC · JPL
116913	2004 GP_{12}	—	April 11, 2004	Palomar	NEAT	·	2.6 km	MPC · JPL
116914	2004 GB_{14}	—	April 13, 2004	Catalina	CSS	·	6.2 km	MPC · JPL
116915	2004 GG_{14}	—	April 13, 2004	Catalina	CSS	·	2.5 km	MPC · JPL
116916	2004 GD_{15}	—	April 12, 2004	Catalina	CSS	T_{j} (2.99) · EUP	7.9 km	MPC · JPL
116917	2004 GZ_{15}	—	April 9, 2004	Siding Spring	SSS	·	6.8 km	MPC · JPL
116918	2004 GB_{17}	—	April 10, 2004	Palomar	NEAT	·	5.7 km	MPC · JPL
116919	2004 GZ_{22}	—	April 12, 2004	Anderson Mesa	LONEOS	·	3.3 km	MPC · JPL
116920	2004 GW_{23}	—	April 13, 2004	Catalina	CSS	·	3.7 km	MPC · JPL
116921	2004 GA_{24}	—	April 13, 2004	Catalina	CSS	·	4.7 km	MPC · JPL
116922	2004 GS_{24}	—	April 13, 2004	Kitt Peak	Spacewatch	·	2.6 km	MPC · JPL
116923	2004 GK_{26}	—	April 14, 2004	Anderson Mesa	LONEOS	·	6.0 km	MPC · JPL
116924	2004 GL_{26}	—	April 14, 2004	Anderson Mesa	LONEOS	·	2.5 km	MPC · JPL
116925	2004 GR_{26}	—	April 14, 2004	Anderson Mesa	LONEOS	·	5.1 km	MPC · JPL
116926	2004 GY_{26}	—	April 14, 2004	Anderson Mesa	LONEOS	·	7.7 km	MPC · JPL
116927	2004 GA_{27}	—	April 14, 2004	Palomar	NEAT	TIR	3.5 km	MPC · JPL
116928	2004 GL_{27}	—	April 15, 2004	Catalina	CSS	ADE	4.7 km	MPC · JPL
116929	2004 GO_{27}	—	April 15, 2004	Palomar	NEAT	·	4.3 km	MPC · JPL
116930	2004 GE_{29}	—	April 11, 2004	Catalina	CSS	L4	20 km	MPC · JPL
116931	2004 GS_{29}	—	April 12, 2004	Palomar	NEAT	·	2.9 km	MPC · JPL
116932	2004 GT_{29}	—	April 12, 2004	Palomar	NEAT	·	2.4 km	MPC · JPL
116933	2004 GH_{30}	—	April 12, 2004	Palomar	NEAT	EUN	2.5 km	MPC · JPL
116934	2004 GF_{31}	—	April 13, 2004	Palomar	NEAT	HYG	4.9 km	MPC · JPL
116935	2004 GA_{36}	—	April 13, 2004	Palomar	NEAT	V	1.5 km	MPC · JPL
116936	2004 GA_{38}	—	April 14, 2004	Palomar	NEAT	EUN	3.3 km	MPC · JPL
116937	2004 GP_{38}	—	April 15, 2004	Catalina	CSS	·	2.6 km	MPC · JPL
116938	2004 GS_{38}	—	April 15, 2004	Catalina	CSS	·	2.4 km	MPC · JPL
116939 Jonstewart	2004 GG_{39}	Jonstewart	April 15, 2004	Catalina	CSS	·	2.6 km	MPC · JPL
116940	2004 GX_{39}	—	April 15, 2004	Siding Spring	SSS	·	5.2 km	MPC · JPL
116941	2004 GE_{40}	—	April 11, 2004	Palomar	NEAT	·	5.0 km	MPC · JPL
116942	2004 GG_{41}	—	April 12, 2004	Siding Spring	SSS	ADE	4.4 km	MPC · JPL
116943	2004 GV_{42}	—	April 15, 2004	Socorro	LINEAR	·	2.9 km	MPC · JPL
116944	2004 GK_{44}	—	April 12, 2004	Kitt Peak	Spacewatch	·	1.2 km	MPC · JPL
116945	2004 GL_{45}	—	April 12, 2004	Kitt Peak	Spacewatch	·	2.0 km	MPC · JPL
116946	2004 GT_{45}	—	April 12, 2004	Kitt Peak	Spacewatch	V	950 m	MPC · JPL
116947	2004 GH_{66}	—	April 13, 2004	Kitt Peak	Spacewatch	KOR	1.9 km	MPC · JPL
116948	2004 GH_{71}	—	April 13, 2004	Palomar	NEAT	GEF	2.6 km	MPC · JPL
116949	2004 GA_{74}	—	April 11, 2004	Catalina	CSS	·	1.5 km	MPC · JPL
116950	2004 GL_{75}	—	April 15, 2004	Socorro	LINEAR	BRA	3.4 km	MPC · JPL
116951	2004 GN_{76}	—	April 15, 2004	Socorro	LINEAR	·	3.1 km	MPC · JPL
116952	2004 GP_{76}	—	April 15, 2004	Socorro	LINEAR	CYB	7.7 km	MPC · JPL
116953	2004 GA_{78}	—	April 15, 2004	Siding Spring	SSS	·	3.5 km	MPC · JPL
116954	2004 HS_{1}	—	April 20, 2004	Desert Eagle	W. K. Y. Yeung	L4	14 km	MPC · JPL
116955	2004 HK_{2}	—	April 16, 2004	Kitt Peak	Spacewatch	ERI	3.2 km	MPC · JPL
116956	2004 HG_{3}	—	April 16, 2004	Anderson Mesa	LONEOS	·	7.1 km	MPC · JPL
116957	2004 HL_{3}	—	April 16, 2004	Palomar	NEAT	·	4.1 km	MPC · JPL
116958	2004 HZ_{3}	—	April 17, 2004	Socorro	LINEAR	·	3.7 km	MPC · JPL
116959	2004 HB_{6}	—	April 17, 2004	Socorro	LINEAR	·	4.8 km	MPC · JPL
116960	2004 HD_{6}	—	April 17, 2004	Socorro	LINEAR	V	1.2 km	MPC · JPL
116961	2004 HH_{6}	—	April 17, 2004	Socorro	LINEAR	ADE	4.8 km	MPC · JPL
116962	2004 HE_{7}	—	April 17, 2004	Socorro	LINEAR	·	5.1 km	MPC · JPL
116963	2004 HC_{8}	—	April 16, 2004	Kitt Peak	Spacewatch	·	2.9 km	MPC · JPL
116964	2004 HD_{8}	—	April 16, 2004	Socorro	LINEAR	·	5.7 km	MPC · JPL
116965	2004 HB_{9}	—	April 16, 2004	Palomar	NEAT	·	2.2 km	MPC · JPL
116966	2004 HH_{10}	—	April 17, 2004	Socorro	LINEAR	GEF	2.4 km	MPC · JPL
116967	2004 HO_{10}	—	April 17, 2004	Socorro	LINEAR	·	3.3 km	MPC · JPL
116968	2004 HJ_{11}	—	April 19, 2004	Socorro	LINEAR	NYS	1.9 km	MPC · JPL
116969	2004 HZ_{11}	—	April 19, 2004	Socorro	LINEAR	L4	21 km	MPC · JPL
116970	2004 HJ_{15}	—	April 16, 2004	Kitt Peak	Spacewatch	L4	10 km	MPC · JPL
116971	2004 HH_{16}	—	April 17, 2004	Socorro	LINEAR	·	2.7 km	MPC · JPL
116972	2004 HZ_{16}	—	April 16, 2004	Socorro	LINEAR	·	3.8 km	MPC · JPL
116973	2004 HZ_{17}	—	April 17, 2004	Socorro	LINEAR	·	1.4 km	MPC · JPL
116974	2004 HQ_{18}	—	April 17, 2004	Palomar	NEAT	MRX	1.9 km	MPC · JPL
116975	2004 HC_{25}	—	April 19, 2004	Socorro	LINEAR	THM	4.8 km	MPC · JPL
116976	2004 HH_{26}	—	April 19, 2004	Socorro	LINEAR	·	5.4 km	MPC · JPL
116977	2004 HO_{27}	—	April 20, 2004	Socorro	LINEAR	·	2.1 km	MPC · JPL
116978	2004 HK_{28}	—	April 20, 2004	Socorro	LINEAR	HOF	5.9 km	MPC · JPL
116979	2004 HY_{28}	—	April 20, 2004	Socorro	LINEAR	·	3.6 km	MPC · JPL
116980	2004 HD_{29}	—	April 21, 2004	Kitt Peak	Spacewatch	KOR	2.0 km	MPC · JPL
116981	2004 HP_{30}	—	April 21, 2004	Socorro	LINEAR	EOS	3.3 km	MPC · JPL
116982	2004 HU_{30}	—	April 17, 2004	Socorro	LINEAR	BRA	3.1 km	MPC · JPL
116983	2004 HT_{33}	—	April 16, 2004	Socorro	LINEAR	·	2.7 km	MPC · JPL
116984	2004 HW_{33}	—	April 16, 2004	Socorro	LINEAR	VER	5.8 km	MPC · JPL
116985	2004 HY_{33}	—	April 16, 2004	Socorro	LINEAR	·	3.0 km	MPC · JPL
116986	2004 HC_{34}	—	April 16, 2004	Palomar	NEAT	·	2.1 km	MPC · JPL
116987	2004 HF_{34}	—	April 16, 2004	Palomar	NEAT	·	3.1 km	MPC · JPL
116988	2004 HM_{34}	—	April 17, 2004	Socorro	LINEAR	RAF	3.1 km	MPC · JPL
116989	2004 HW_{42}	—	April 20, 2004	Socorro	LINEAR	·	6.4 km	MPC · JPL
116990	2004 HT_{44}	—	April 21, 2004	Socorro	LINEAR	EUN	2.9 km	MPC · JPL
116991	2004 HK_{45}	—	April 21, 2004	Socorro	LINEAR	LIX	8.2 km	MPC · JPL
116992	2004 HS_{45}	—	April 21, 2004	Socorro	LINEAR	EOS	3.6 km	MPC · JPL
116993	2004 HZ_{45}	—	April 21, 2004	Siding Spring	SSS	EUP	11 km	MPC · JPL
116994	2004 HC_{47}	—	April 22, 2004	Socorro	LINEAR	HYG	4.7 km	MPC · JPL
116995	2004 HN_{47}	—	April 22, 2004	Catalina	CSS	TIR	3.7 km	MPC · JPL
116996	2004 HQ_{48}	—	April 22, 2004	Siding Spring	SSS	·	3.2 km	MPC · JPL
116997	2004 HC_{50}	—	April 23, 2004	Socorro	LINEAR	·	1.5 km	MPC · JPL
116998	2004 HV_{50}	—	April 23, 2004	Haleakala	NEAT	(58892)	4.9 km	MPC · JPL
116999	2004 HG_{53}	—	April 25, 2004	Socorro	LINEAR	RAF	1.8 km	MPC · JPL
117000	2004 HU_{54}	—	April 21, 2004	Socorro	LINEAR	·	7.1 km	MPC · JPL

back to top

== See also ==
- Meanings of minor-planet names: 116001–117000
