= Meanings of minor-planet names: 116001–117000 =

As minor planet discoveries are confirmed, they are given a permanent number by the IAU's Minor Planet Center (MPC), and the discoverers can then submit names for them, following the IAU's naming conventions. The list below concerns those minor planets in the specified number-range that have received names, and explains the meanings of those names.

Official naming citations of newly named small Solar System bodies are approved and published in a bulletin by IAU's Working Group for Small Bodies Nomenclature (WGSBN). Before May 2021, citations were published in MPC's Minor Planet Circulars for many decades. Recent citations can also be found on the JPL Small-Body Database (SBDB). Until his death in 2016, German astronomer Lutz D. Schmadel compiled these citations into the Dictionary of Minor Planet Names (DMP) and regularly updated the collection.

Based on Paul Herget's The Names of the Minor Planets, Schmadel also researched the unclear origin of numerous asteroids, most of which had been named prior to World War II. This article incorporates text from this source, which is in the public domain: SBDB New namings may only be added to this list below after official publication as the preannouncement of names is condemned. The WGSBN publishes a comprehensive guideline for the naming rules of non-cometary small Solar System bodies.

== 116001–116100 ==
Named minor planet	Provisional	This minor planet was named for...	Ref · Catalog
There are no named minor planets in this number range

== 116101–116200 ==
back to top

Named minor planet	Provisional	This minor planet was named for...	Ref · Catalog
116162 Sidneygutierrez	2003 WL_{181}	Sidney M. Gutierrez (born 1951) is a former American astronaut. He was the pilot on the Space Shuttle Columbia in 1991. That mission was the first Spacelab mission dedicated to biological sciences. He was the commander of a Space Shuttle Endeavour mission in 1994 that used radar to study the Earth.	JPL · 116162
116166 Andrémaeder	2003 XJ	André Maeder (born 1942), Swiss astronomer and former director of the Geneva Observatory	JPL · 116166

== 116201–116300 ==
back to top

Named minor planet	Provisional	This minor planet was named for...	Ref · Catalog
There are no named minor planets in this number range

== 116301–116400 ==
back to top

Named minor planet	Provisional	This minor planet was named for...	Ref · Catalog
There are no named minor planets in this number range

== 116401–116500 ==
back to top

Named minor planet	Provisional	This minor planet was named for...	Ref · Catalog
116446 McDermid	2004 AG	Stuart McDermid (born 1952), senior research scientist in JPL's Science Division	JPL · 116446

== 116501–116600 ==
back to top

Named minor planet	Provisional	This minor planet was named for...	Ref · Catalog
There are no named minor planets in this number range

== 116601–116700 ==
back to top

Named minor planet	Provisional	This minor planet was named for...	Ref · Catalog
There are no named minor planets in this number range

== 116701–116800 ==
back to top

Named minor planet	Provisional	This minor planet was named for...	Ref · Catalog
There are no named minor planets in this number range

== 116801–116900 ==
back to top

Named minor planet	Provisional	This minor planet was named for...	Ref · Catalog
There are no named minor planets in this number range

== 116901–117000 ==
back to top

Named minor planet	Provisional	This minor planet was named for...	Ref · Catalog
116903 Jeromeapt	2004 GW	Jerome Apt (born 1949), American astronaut and director of the Table Mountain Observatory	JPL · 116903
116939 Jonstewart	2004 GG_{39}	Jon Stewart (born 1962), American comedian, satirist, actor, author and producer	JPL · 116939

back to top

Preceded by 115,001–116,000	Meanings of minor-planet names List of minor planets: 116,001–117,000	Succeeded by 117,001–118,000
