= 116903 Jeromeapt =

Main-belt asteroid

Discovery
- Discovered by: J. W. Young
- Discovery site: Table Mountain Obs.
- Discovery date: 11 April 2004

Designations
- Named after: Jerome Apt (American astronaut)
- Alternative designations: 2004 GW · 2001 RS_{104}
- Minor planet category: main-belt · (inner); Massalia

Orbital characteristics
- Epoch 27 April 2019 (JD 2458600.5)
- Uncertainty parameter 0
- Observation arc: 17.80 yr (6,501 d)
- Aphelion: 2.8746 AU
- Perihelion: 2.0238 AU
- Semi-major axis: 2.4492 AU
- Eccentricity: 0.1737
- Orbital period (sidereal): 3.83 yr (1,400 d)
- Mean anomaly: 265.16°
- Mean motion: 0° 15^{m} 25.56^{s} / day
- Inclination: 1.5343°
- Longitude of ascending node: 147.08°
- Argument of perihelion: 128.95°

Physical characteristics
- Mean diameter: 1.1 km (est. at 0.22)
- Absolute magnitude (H): 17.1

116903 Jeromeapt (provisional designation 2004 GW) is an asteroid of the Massalia family from the inner regions of the asteroid belt, approximately 1.1 kilometers (0.7 miles) in diameter. It was discovered on 11 April 2004, by American astronomer Jim Young at the Table Mountain Observatory near Wrightwood, California, in the United States. The asteroid was named for American astronaut Jerome Apt.

== Orbit and classification ==
Jeromeapt is a member of the Massalia family (404), a large family of stony S-type asteroids with low inclinations. It orbits the sun in the inner main belt at a distance of 2.0–2.9 AU once every 3 years and 10 months (1,400 days; semi-major axis of 2.45 AU). Its orbit has an eccentricity of 0.17 and an inclination of 2° with respect to the ecliptic. The asteroid's observation arc begins more than 2 years prior to its official discovery observation, with a precovery taken by Spacewatch at the Steward Observatory in February 2002.

== Naming ==
This minor planet was named in honor of American Jerome Apt (born 1949), who was the discovering observatory's director and also an astronaut on four Space Shuttle missions in the 1990s. At the time of naming this asteroid, he was a professor at Carnegie Mellon University. The official naming citation was published by the Minor Planet Center 29 October 2012 (M.P.C. 81070).

== Physical characteristics ==
Since Massalia asteroids are of silicaceous rather than carbonaceous composition, with an albedo typically around 0.22 (also see list of families), Jeromeapt possibly measures 1.1 kilometer in diameter, based on an absolute magnitude of 17.1. As of 2018, the asteroid's effective size, its composition and albedo, as well as its rotation period and shape remain unknown.
