= List of minor planets: 641001–642000 =

The following is a partial list of minor planets, running from minor-planet number 641001 through 642000, inclusive. The primary data for this and other partial lists is based on JPL's "Small-Body Orbital Elements" and data available from the Minor Planet Center. Critical list information is also provided by the MPC, unless otherwise specified from Lowell Observatory. A detailed description of the table's columns and additional sources are given on the main page including a complete list of every page in this series, and a statistical break-up on the dynamical classification of minor planets.

Also see the summary list of all named bodies in numerical and alphabetical order, and the corresponding naming citations for the number range of this particular list. New namings may only be added to this list after official publication, as the preannouncement of names is condemned by the Working Group for Small Bodies Nomenclature of the International Astronomical Union.

| Near-Earth obj. | MBA (inner) | MBA (outer) | Centaur |
| Mars-crosser | MBA (middle) | Jupiter trojan | Trans-Neptunian obj. |
| Unclassified |

== 641001–641100 ==
| Designation | | | Discovery | | | Properties | | Ref |
| Permanent | Provisional | Named after | Date | Site | Discoverer(s) | Category | Diam. | Ref |
|---|---|---|---|---|---|---|---|---|
| 641001 | 2002 RH_{289} | — | November 17, 2009 | Mount Lemmon | Mount Lemmon Survey | · | 670 m | MPC · JPL |
| 641002 | 2002 RL_{290} | — | September 9, 2002 | Palomar | NEAT | · | 2.5 km | MPC · JPL |
| 641003 | 2002 RH_{291} | — | November 17, 2009 | Catalina | CSS | · | 740 m | MPC · JPL |
| 641004 | 2002 RD_{294} | — | April 14, 2004 | Kitt Peak | Spacewatch | H | 450 m | MPC · JPL |
| 641005 | 2002 RK_{294} | — | September 21, 2012 | Mount Lemmon | Mount Lemmon Survey | · | 590 m | MPC · JPL |
| 641006 | 2002 RX_{295} | — | September 10, 2002 | Palomar | NEAT | · | 2.3 km | MPC · JPL |
| 641007 | 2002 RZ_{295} | — | February 26, 2012 | Haleakala | Pan-STARRS 1 | H | 560 m | MPC · JPL |
| 641008 | 2002 RP_{297} | — | October 3, 2006 | Mount Lemmon | Mount Lemmon Survey | · | 1.2 km | MPC · JPL |
| 641009 | 2002 RN_{298} | — | August 14, 2012 | Haleakala | Pan-STARRS 1 | EOS | 1.5 km | MPC · JPL |
| 641010 | 2002 RV_{298} | — | September 3, 2002 | Palomar | NEAT | EUN | 1.0 km | MPC · JPL |
| 641011 | 2002 RT_{299} | — | November 1, 2015 | Mount Lemmon | Mount Lemmon Survey | · | 1.1 km | MPC · JPL |
| 641012 | 2002 RU_{299} | — | January 27, 2007 | Kitt Peak | Spacewatch | · | 580 m | MPC · JPL |
| 641013 | 2002 RM_{300} | — | December 4, 2015 | Haleakala | Pan-STARRS 1 | (5) | 1.2 km | MPC · JPL |
| 641014 | 2002 RS_{300} | — | May 27, 2014 | Haleakala | Pan-STARRS 1 | EUN | 1.1 km | MPC · JPL |
| 641015 | 2002 RX_{300} | — | September 3, 2002 | Palomar | NEAT | · | 1.1 km | MPC · JPL |
| 641016 | 2002 RY_{300} | — | August 29, 2006 | Kitt Peak | Spacewatch | KON | 2.1 km | MPC · JPL |
| 641017 | 2002 RA_{301} | — | August 22, 2014 | Haleakala | Pan-STARRS 1 | · | 1.1 km | MPC · JPL |
| 641018 | 2002 RD_{301} | — | December 5, 2007 | Kitt Peak | Spacewatch | · | 1.3 km | MPC · JPL |
| 641019 | 2002 SU_{13} | — | September 14, 2002 | Anderson Mesa | LONEOS | · | 1.7 km | MPC · JPL |
| 641020 | 2002 SQ_{33} | — | September 28, 2002 | Haleakala | NEAT | NYS | 1.1 km | MPC · JPL |
| 641021 | 2002 SK_{52} | — | September 10, 2002 | Palomar | NEAT | · | 970 m | MPC · JPL |
| 641022 | 2002 SF_{63} | — | September 5, 2002 | Socorro | LINEAR | · | 1.8 km | MPC · JPL |
| 641023 | 2002 SN_{63} | — | August 12, 2002 | Cerro Tololo | Deep Ecliptic Survey | · | 830 m | MPC · JPL |
| 641024 | 2002 SR_{63} | — | September 27, 2002 | Palomar | NEAT | BRG | 1.4 km | MPC · JPL |
| 641025 | 2002 SG_{66} | — | September 13, 2002 | Anderson Mesa | LONEOS | · | 1.0 km | MPC · JPL |
| 641026 | 2002 ST_{68} | — | September 26, 2002 | Palomar | NEAT | MAR | 760 m | MPC · JPL |
| 641027 | 2002 SF_{71} | — | September 19, 2007 | Kitt Peak | Spacewatch | · | 2.1 km | MPC · JPL |
| 641028 | 2002 SZ_{71} | — | September 16, 2002 | Palomar | NEAT | · | 1.3 km | MPC · JPL |
| 641029 | 2002 SV_{72} | — | September 16, 2002 | Palomar | NEAT | · | 1.7 km | MPC · JPL |
| 641030 | 2002 SR_{75} | — | November 6, 2013 | Haleakala | Pan-STARRS 1 | · | 2.6 km | MPC · JPL |
| 641031 | 2002 SW_{75} | — | July 25, 2006 | Palomar | NEAT | · | 1.1 km | MPC · JPL |
| 641032 | 2002 TB_{2} | — | October 1, 2002 | Anderson Mesa | LONEOS | · | 980 m | MPC · JPL |
| 641033 | 2002 TE_{12} | — | October 1, 2002 | Anderson Meas | LONEOS | · | 1.3 km | MPC · JPL |
| 641034 | 2002 TB_{17} | — | October 1, 2002 | Haleakala | NEAT | · | 1.4 km | MPC · JPL |
| 641035 | 2002 TG_{29} | — | October 2, 2002 | Socorro | LINEAR | · | 1.8 km | MPC · JPL |
| 641036 | 2002 TH_{59} | — | October 4, 2002 | Socorro | LINEAR | · | 2.0 km | MPC · JPL |
| 641037 | 2002 TQ_{98} | — | October 3, 2002 | Socorro | LINEAR | · | 1.2 km | MPC · JPL |
| 641038 | 2002 TC_{104} | — | September 6, 2002 | Socorro | LINEAR | · | 810 m | MPC · JPL |
| 641039 | 2002 TO_{117} | — | October 3, 2002 | Palomar | NEAT | · | 2.2 km | MPC · JPL |
| 641040 | 2002 TF_{118} | — | October 3, 2002 | Palomar | NEAT | · | 1.2 km | MPC · JPL |
| 641041 | 2002 TZ_{118} | — | October 3, 2002 | Palomar | NEAT | MAR | 1.0 km | MPC · JPL |
| 641042 | 2002 TO_{131} | — | September 28, 2002 | Haleakala | NEAT | · | 1.1 km | MPC · JPL |
| 641043 | 2002 TY_{141} | — | October 5, 2002 | Palomar | NEAT | · | 1.3 km | MPC · JPL |
| 641044 | 2002 TZ_{146} | — | October 4, 2002 | Socorro | LINEAR | · | 980 m | MPC · JPL |
| 641045 | 2002 TA_{148} | — | August 4, 2002 | Palomar Mountain | NEAT | · | 1.4 km | MPC · JPL |
| 641046 | 2002 TQ_{148} | — | August 11, 2002 | Socorro | LINEAR | · | 1.4 km | MPC · JPL |
| 641047 | 2002 TQ_{153} | — | October 5, 2002 | Palomar | NEAT | · | 640 m | MPC · JPL |
| 641048 | 2002 TC_{156} | — | September 12, 2002 | Palomar | NEAT | ADE | 2.1 km | MPC · JPL |
| 641049 | 2002 TM_{167} | — | September 3, 2002 | Palomar | NEAT | · | 810 m | MPC · JPL |
| 641050 | 2002 TN_{167} | — | September 15, 2002 | Anderson Mesa | LONEOS | PHO | 940 m | MPC · JPL |
| 641051 | 2002 TD_{201} | — | October 5, 2002 | Kitt Peak | Spacewatch | · | 590 m | MPC · JPL |
| 641052 | 2002 TU_{209} | — | October 6, 2002 | Haleakala | NEAT | EUN | 1.3 km | MPC · JPL |
| 641053 | 2002 TG_{221} | — | October 6, 2002 | Socorro | LINEAR | EUN | 1.2 km | MPC · JPL |
| 641054 | 2002 TP_{235} | — | October 6, 2002 | Socorro | LINEAR | · | 1.2 km | MPC · JPL |
| 641055 | 2002 TJ_{236} | — | October 6, 2002 | Socorro | LINEAR | · | 1.4 km | MPC · JPL |
| 641056 | 2002 TJ_{252} | — | October 8, 2002 | Anderson Mesa | LONEOS | · | 630 m | MPC · JPL |
| 641057 | 2002 TV_{269} | — | September 28, 2002 | Haleakala | NEAT | · | 1.9 km | MPC · JPL |
| 641058 | 2002 TM_{383} | — | October 5, 2002 | Apache Point | SDSS Collaboration | EOS | 1.5 km | MPC · JPL |
| 641059 | 2002 TD_{386} | — | August 29, 2006 | Kitt Peak | Spacewatch | (5) | 840 m | MPC · JPL |
| 641060 | 2002 TT_{389} | — | September 19, 2007 | Kitt Peak | Spacewatch | · | 2.1 km | MPC · JPL |
| 641061 | 2002 TS_{390} | — | May 9, 2013 | Haleakala | Pan-STARRS 1 | · | 1.3 km | MPC · JPL |
| 641062 | 2002 TV_{390} | — | September 21, 2009 | La Sagra | OAM | · | 730 m | MPC · JPL |
| 641063 | 2002 TA_{391} | — | October 31, 2006 | Mount Lemmon | Mount Lemmon Survey | · | 950 m | MPC · JPL |
| 641064 | 2002 TK_{391} | — | April 12, 2013 | Haleakala | Pan-STARRS 1 | HNS | 1.2 km | MPC · JPL |
| 641065 | 2002 TB_{392} | — | January 28, 2012 | Haleakala | Pan-STARRS 1 | EUN | 960 m | MPC · JPL |
| 641066 | 2002 TG_{392} | — | October 5, 2002 | Palomar | NEAT | · | 1.1 km | MPC · JPL |
| 641067 | 2002 TL_{392} | — | March 4, 2017 | Haleakala | Pan-STARRS 1 | · | 1.0 km | MPC · JPL |
| 641068 | 2002 TC_{394} | — | December 21, 2006 | Kitt Peak | Spacewatch | · | 590 m | MPC · JPL |
| 641069 | 2002 TE_{394} | — | August 19, 2006 | Kitt Peak | Spacewatch | (5) | 1.1 km | MPC · JPL |
| 641070 | 2002 UW_{13} | — | September 29, 2002 | Haleakala | NEAT | · | 1.5 km | MPC · JPL |
| 641071 | 2002 UF_{19} | — | October 30, 2002 | Haleakala | NEAT | PHO | 850 m | MPC · JPL |
| 641072 | 2002 UR_{24} | — | October 29, 2002 | Kitt Peak | Spacewatch | · | 1.4 km | MPC · JPL |
| 641073 | 2002 UD_{26} | — | October 30, 2002 | Kitt Peak | Spacewatch | · | 1.4 km | MPC · JPL |
| 641074 | 2002 UW_{29} | — | October 9, 2002 | Kitt Peak | Spacewatch | · | 870 m | MPC · JPL |
| 641075 | 2002 US_{73} | — | October 29, 2002 | Palomar | NEAT | · | 510 m | MPC · JPL |
| 641076 | 2002 UW_{76} | — | October 28, 2002 | Palomar | NEAT | · | 1.0 km | MPC · JPL |
| 641077 | 2002 UD_{77} | — | November 4, 2002 | Anderson Mesa | LONEOS | · | 970 m | MPC · JPL |
| 641078 | 2002 UD_{79} | — | October 31, 2002 | Palomar | NEAT | · | 1.3 km | MPC · JPL |
| 641079 | 2002 UF_{79} | — | September 30, 2006 | Catalina | CSS | · | 1.1 km | MPC · JPL |
| 641080 | 2002 UA_{80} | — | October 31, 2002 | Haleakala | NEAT | · | 700 m | MPC · JPL |
| 641081 | 2002 UD_{80} | — | November 1, 2002 | Haleakala | NEAT | EUN | 1.2 km | MPC · JPL |
| 641082 | 2002 UQ_{80} | — | September 29, 2010 | Mount Lemmon | Mount Lemmon Survey | BRG | 1.5 km | MPC · JPL |
| 641083 | 2002 UO_{81} | — | August 25, 2012 | Kitt Peak | Spacewatch | · | 610 m | MPC · JPL |
| 641084 | 2002 US_{81} | — | November 1, 2006 | Catalina | CSS | MAR | 1.1 km | MPC · JPL |
| 641085 | 2002 UV_{81} | — | June 16, 2018 | Haleakala | Pan-STARRS 1 | · | 1.1 km | MPC · JPL |
| 641086 | 2002 UD_{82} | — | September 22, 2009 | Mount Lemmon | Mount Lemmon Survey | V | 450 m | MPC · JPL |
| 641087 | 2002 VX | — | November 1, 2002 | La Palma | A. Fitzsimmons | · | 750 m | MPC · JPL |
| 641088 | 2002 VW_{4} | — | November 4, 2002 | Kitt Peak | Spacewatch | · | 1.7 km | MPC · JPL |
| 641089 | 2002 VJ_{15} | — | October 31, 2002 | Palomar | NEAT | H | 530 m | MPC · JPL |
| 641090 | 2002 VR_{18} | — | October 3, 2002 | Palomar | NEAT | GAL | 1.6 km | MPC · JPL |
| 641091 | 2002 VL_{25} | — | October 31, 2002 | Palomar | NEAT | V | 850 m | MPC · JPL |
| 641092 | 2002 VT_{46} | — | October 31, 2002 | Palomar | NEAT | · | 3.6 km | MPC · JPL |
| 641093 | 2002 VH_{115} | — | November 11, 2002 | Socorro | LINEAR | · | 550 m | MPC · JPL |
| 641094 | 2002 VR_{116} | — | November 11, 2002 | Kingsnake | J. V. McClusky | · | 930 m | MPC · JPL |
| 641095 | 2002 VQ_{132} | — | November 2, 2002 | La Palma | A. Fitzsimmons | · | 1.8 km | MPC · JPL |
| 641096 | 2002 VF_{137} | — | September 19, 1995 | Kitt Peak | Spacewatch | · | 540 m | MPC · JPL |
| 641097 | 2002 VQ_{138} | — | November 13, 2002 | Palomar | NEAT | · | 2.1 km | MPC · JPL |
| 641098 | 2002 VP_{144} | — | November 4, 2002 | Palomar | NEAT | · | 600 m | MPC · JPL |
| 641099 | 2002 VT_{144} | — | November 4, 2002 | Palomar | NEAT | PHO | 850 m | MPC · JPL |
| 641100 | 2002 VW_{147} | — | November 13, 2002 | Palomar | NEAT | EUN | 850 m | MPC · JPL |

== 641101–641200 ==
back to top

| Designation | | | Discovery | | | Properties | | Ref |
| Permanent | Provisional | Named after | Date | Site | Discoverer(s) | Category | Diam. | Ref |
|---|---|---|---|---|---|---|---|---|
| 641101 | 2002 VK_{148} | — | November 4, 2010 | Les Engarouines | L. Bernasconi | · | 1.2 km | MPC · JPL |
| 641102 | 2002 VM_{148} | — | September 14, 2007 | Catalina | CSS | · | 2.7 km | MPC · JPL |
| 641103 | 2002 VS_{149} | — | June 21, 2012 | Mount Lemmon | Mount Lemmon Survey | · | 730 m | MPC · JPL |
| 641104 | 2002 VC_{150} | — | November 16, 2009 | Kitt Peak | Spacewatch | · | 870 m | MPC · JPL |
| 641105 | 2002 VG_{150} | — | April 4, 2011 | Kitt Peak | Spacewatch | · | 720 m | MPC · JPL |
| 641106 | 2002 VQ_{150} | — | August 12, 2006 | Palomar | NEAT | (1547) | 1.7 km | MPC · JPL |
| 641107 | 2002 VR_{150} | — | October 20, 2012 | Haleakala | Pan-STARRS 1 | · | 1.5 km | MPC · JPL |
| 641108 | 2002 VW_{151} | — | March 5, 2014 | Haleakala | Pan-STARRS 1 | · | 650 m | MPC · JPL |
| 641109 | 2002 VD_{152} | — | November 14, 2002 | Palomar | NEAT | · | 1.3 km | MPC · JPL |
| 641110 | 2002 VM_{152} | — | February 2, 2009 | Kitt Peak | Spacewatch | · | 1.6 km | MPC · JPL |
| 641111 | 2002 VX_{152} | — | September 17, 2012 | Mount Lemmon | Mount Lemmon Survey | · | 630 m | MPC · JPL |
| 641112 | 2002 VR_{153} | — | April 19, 2004 | Kitt Peak | Spacewatch | · | 970 m | MPC · JPL |
| 641113 | 2002 VS_{153} | — | October 26, 2009 | Kitt Peak | Spacewatch | · | 520 m | MPC · JPL |
| 641114 | 2002 VM_{154} | — | November 13, 2002 | Palomar | NEAT | · | 1.3 km | MPC · JPL |
| 641115 | 2002 WX_{1} | — | November 23, 2002 | Palomar | NEAT | · | 1.2 km | MPC · JPL |
| 641116 | 2002 WY_{4} | — | November 24, 2002 | Palomar | NEAT | · | 3.0 km | MPC · JPL |
| 641117 | 2002 WQ_{13} | — | November 27, 2002 | Anderson Mesa | LONEOS | · | 3.7 km | MPC · JPL |
| 641118 | 2002 WH_{20} | — | December 5, 2002 | Socorro | LINEAR | · | 1.0 km | MPC · JPL |
| 641119 | 2002 WY_{22} | — | November 24, 2002 | Palomar | NEAT | · | 1.6 km | MPC · JPL |
| 641120 | 2002 WV_{23} | — | November 24, 2002 | Palomar | NEAT | EUN | 1.1 km | MPC · JPL |
| 641121 | 2002 WJ_{24} | — | November 16, 2002 | Palomar | NEAT | · | 520 m | MPC · JPL |
| 641122 | 2002 WH_{25} | — | November 25, 2002 | Palomar | NEAT | · | 3.3 km | MPC · JPL |
| 641123 | 2002 WU_{25} | — | November 16, 2002 | Palomar | NEAT | · | 2.0 km | MPC · JPL |
| 641124 | 2002 WF_{31} | — | October 30, 2008 | Mount Lemmon | Mount Lemmon Survey | EOS | 2.4 km | MPC · JPL |
| 641125 | 2002 WQ_{32} | — | August 26, 2012 | Haleakala | Pan-STARRS 1 | · | 720 m | MPC · JPL |
| 641126 | 2002 WU_{32} | — | March 21, 2004 | Kitt Peak | Spacewatch | (194) | 1.2 km | MPC · JPL |
| 641127 | 2002 XE_{2} | — | November 24, 2002 | Palomar | NEAT | · | 1.1 km | MPC · JPL |
| 641128 | 2002 XM_{18} | — | December 5, 2002 | Socorro | LINEAR | · | 1.1 km | MPC · JPL |
| 641129 | 2002 XA_{38} | — | November 12, 2002 | Palomar | NEAT | H | 570 m | MPC · JPL |
| 641130 | 2002 XD_{92} | — | December 4, 2002 | Kitt Peak | Deep Ecliptic Survey | · | 1.8 km | MPC · JPL |
| 641131 | 2002 XT_{117} | — | December 10, 2002 | Palomar | NEAT | BRA | 1.2 km | MPC · JPL |
| 641132 | 2002 XS_{121} | — | November 2, 2007 | Kitt Peak | Spacewatch | · | 1.6 km | MPC · JPL |
| 641133 | 2002 XX_{121} | — | October 23, 2012 | Kitt Peak | Spacewatch | · | 770 m | MPC · JPL |
| 641134 | 2002 XM_{122} | — | September 3, 2010 | Mount Lemmon | Mount Lemmon Survey | · | 1.2 km | MPC · JPL |
| 641135 | 2002 XZ_{122} | — | December 25, 2013 | Mount Lemmon | Mount Lemmon Survey | EOS | 1.6 km | MPC · JPL |
| 641136 | 2002 XD_{123} | — | November 22, 1995 | Kitt Peak | Spacewatch | · | 580 m | MPC · JPL |
| 641137 | 2002 XG_{123} | — | November 28, 2013 | Mount Lemmon | Mount Lemmon Survey | · | 2.5 km | MPC · JPL |
| 641138 | 2002 XK_{123} | — | February 7, 2008 | Kitt Peak | Spacewatch | · | 1.2 km | MPC · JPL |
| 641139 | 2002 XU_{123} | — | May 10, 2015 | Mount Lemmon | Mount Lemmon Survey | V | 450 m | MPC · JPL |
| 641140 | 2002 XV_{123} | — | June 7, 2013 | Haleakala | Pan-STARRS 1 | EUN | 870 m | MPC · JPL |
| 641141 | 2002 YL_{11} | — | December 31, 2002 | Bohyunsan | Jeon, Y.-B., Lee, H. | · | 710 m | MPC · JPL |
| 641142 | 2002 YS_{12} | — | December 13, 2002 | Socorro | LINEAR | · | 1.7 km | MPC · JPL |
| 641143 | 2002 YC_{27} | — | December 31, 2002 | Socorro | LINEAR | · | 2.0 km | MPC · JPL |
| 641144 | 2002 YA_{37} | — | March 20, 2014 | Mount Lemmon | Mount Lemmon Survey | · | 1.6 km | MPC · JPL |
| 641145 | 2003 AH_{22} | — | January 5, 2003 | Socorro | LINEAR | PHO | 1.1 km | MPC · JPL |
| 641146 | 2003 AN_{71} | — | January 10, 2003 | Kitt Peak | Spacewatch | (2076) | 620 m | MPC · JPL |
| 641147 | 2003 AJ_{83} | — | January 5, 2003 | Kitt Peak | Deep Lens Survey | · | 2.5 km | MPC · JPL |
| 641148 | 2003 AB_{95} | — | January 5, 2003 | Kitt Peak | Spacewatch | EOS | 1.6 km | MPC · JPL |
| 641149 | 2003 AE_{95} | — | November 8, 2007 | Mount Lemmon | Mount Lemmon Survey | · | 1.5 km | MPC · JPL |
| 641150 | 2003 AS_{95} | — | August 27, 2016 | Haleakala | Pan-STARRS 1 | · | 2.2 km | MPC · JPL |
| 641151 | 2003 AV_{95} | — | December 10, 2009 | Mount Lemmon | Mount Lemmon Survey | · | 530 m | MPC · JPL |
| 641152 | 2003 BX_{3} | — | January 24, 2003 | La Silla | A. Boattini, Hainaut, O. | · | 680 m | MPC · JPL |
| 641153 | 2003 BC_{4} | — | January 24, 2003 | La Silla | A. Boattini, Hainaut, O. | · | 2.2 km | MPC · JPL |
| 641154 | 2003 BH_{50} | — | January 7, 2003 | Socorro | LINEAR | PHO | 830 m | MPC · JPL |
| 641155 | 2003 BC_{75} | — | January 24, 2003 | Palomar | NEAT | · | 1.1 km | MPC · JPL |
| 641156 | 2003 BH_{76} | — | January 24, 2003 | Palomar | NEAT | · | 1.5 km | MPC · JPL |
| 641157 | 2003 BS_{95} | — | October 1, 2005 | Catalina | CSS | · | 1.1 km | MPC · JPL |
| 641158 | 2003 BU_{95} | — | October 29, 2005 | Kitt Peak | Spacewatch | V | 630 m | MPC · JPL |
| 641159 | 2003 BX_{95} | — | October 22, 2012 | Haleakala | Pan-STARRS 1 | · | 2.7 km | MPC · JPL |
| 641160 | 2003 BX_{96} | — | March 8, 2014 | Mount Lemmon | Mount Lemmon Survey | · | 1.4 km | MPC · JPL |
| 641161 | 2003 BY_{96} | — | February 24, 2012 | Haleakala | Pan-STARRS 1 | HNS | 1.2 km | MPC · JPL |
| 641162 | 2003 BC_{97} | — | August 27, 2006 | Kitt Peak | Spacewatch | · | 1.9 km | MPC · JPL |
| 641163 | 2003 BO_{97} | — | February 28, 2014 | Haleakala | Pan-STARRS 1 | EOS | 1.4 km | MPC · JPL |
| 641164 | 2003 BN_{98} | — | June 26, 2011 | Mount Lemmon | Mount Lemmon Survey | · | 2.4 km | MPC · JPL |
| 641165 | 2003 BW_{98} | — | October 20, 2012 | Kitt Peak | Spacewatch | · | 1.9 km | MPC · JPL |
| 641166 | 2003 BE_{99} | — | November 3, 2007 | Kitt Peak | Spacewatch | · | 2.5 km | MPC · JPL |
| 641167 | 2003 BL_{99} | — | October 10, 2012 | Mount Lemmon | Mount Lemmon Survey | · | 2.3 km | MPC · JPL |
| 641168 | 2003 BS_{100} | — | July 7, 2014 | Haleakala | Pan-STARRS 1 | · | 1.2 km | MPC · JPL |
| 641169 | 2003 BY_{100} | — | January 26, 2017 | Mount Lemmon | Mount Lemmon Survey | · | 550 m | MPC · JPL |
| 641170 | 2003 BR_{101} | — | April 19, 2013 | Mount Lemmon | Mount Lemmon Survey | · | 1.5 km | MPC · JPL |
| 641171 | 2003 BU_{101} | — | June 14, 2010 | Mount Lemmon | Mount Lemmon Survey | L5 | 9.8 km | MPC · JPL |
| 641172 | 2003 CQ_{10} | — | February 3, 2003 | Palomar | NEAT | PHO | 690 m | MPC · JPL |
| 641173 | 2003 CV_{16} | — | January 27, 2003 | Palomar | NEAT | H | 580 m | MPC · JPL |
| 641174 | 2003 CA_{27} | — | September 30, 2006 | Mount Lemmon | Mount Lemmon Survey | · | 2.5 km | MPC · JPL |
| 641175 | 2003 CD_{27} | — | October 21, 2012 | Haleakala | Pan-STARRS 1 | EOS | 1.5 km | MPC · JPL |
| 641176 | 2003 CE_{27} | — | November 25, 2006 | Kitt Peak | Spacewatch | · | 1.3 km | MPC · JPL |
| 641177 | 2003 EM_{36} | — | March 9, 2003 | Socorro | LINEAR | · | 1.3 km | MPC · JPL |
| 641178 | 2003 EM_{42} | — | March 9, 2003 | Kitt Peak | Spacewatch | · | 560 m | MPC · JPL |
| 641179 | 2003 ER_{43} | — | February 9, 2003 | Palomar | NEAT | · | 2.0 km | MPC · JPL |
| 641180 | 2003 EX_{54} | — | March 7, 2003 | Kitt Peak | Deep Lens Survey | EOS | 1.4 km | MPC · JPL |
| 641181 | 2003 EK_{55} | — | March 9, 2003 | Kitt Peak | Deep Lens Survey | · | 730 m | MPC · JPL |
| 641182 | 2003 EM_{64} | — | May 28, 2014 | Haleakala | Pan-STARRS 1 | · | 690 m | MPC · JPL |
| 641183 | 2003 EU_{64} | — | January 27, 2017 | Mount Lemmon | Mount Lemmon Survey | · | 700 m | MPC · JPL |
| 641184 | 2003 EV_{64} | — | March 13, 2003 | Kitt Peak | Spacewatch | VER | 2.3 km | MPC · JPL |
| 641185 | 2003 EX_{64} | — | May 12, 2015 | Mount Lemmon | Mount Lemmon Survey | · | 2.1 km | MPC · JPL |
| 641186 | 2003 EC_{65} | — | December 9, 2015 | Haleakala | Pan-STARRS 1 | PHO | 1.0 km | MPC · JPL |
| 641187 | 2003 FT_{13} | — | March 23, 2003 | Kitt Peak | Spacewatch | NYS | 730 m | MPC · JPL |
| 641188 | 2003 FD_{57} | — | March 7, 2003 | Anderson Mesa | LONEOS | · | 920 m | MPC · JPL |
| 641189 | 2003 FP_{59} | — | March 26, 2003 | Palomar | NEAT | · | 1.8 km | MPC · JPL |
| 641190 | 2003 FY_{102} | — | March 29, 2003 | Piszkéstető | K. Sárneczky | · | 810 m | MPC · JPL |
| 641191 | 2003 FN_{122} | — | March 31, 2003 | Cerro Tololo | Deep Lens Survey | L4 | 6.0 km | MPC · JPL |
| 641192 | 2003 FK_{124} | — | March 31, 2003 | Kitt Peak | Spacewatch | EUN | 1.1 km | MPC · JPL |
| 641193 | 2003 FB_{125} | — | March 30, 2003 | Kitt Peak | Deep Ecliptic Survey | L4 | 8.7 km | MPC · JPL |
| 641194 | 2003 FR_{125} | — | March 30, 2003 | Kitt Peak | Deep Ecliptic Survey | · | 1.3 km | MPC · JPL |
| 641195 | 2003 FT_{125} | — | March 30, 2003 | Kitt Peak | Deep Ecliptic Survey | EOS | 1.4 km | MPC · JPL |
| 641196 | 2003 FR_{126} | — | March 31, 2003 | Kitt Peak | Spacewatch | · | 870 m | MPC · JPL |
| 641197 | 2003 FL_{134} | — | November 17, 2006 | Mount Lemmon | Mount Lemmon Survey | VER | 3.0 km | MPC · JPL |
| 641198 | 2003 FH_{135} | — | April 5, 2014 | Haleakala | Pan-STARRS 1 | · | 2.1 km | MPC · JPL |
| 641199 | 2003 FW_{135} | — | May 4, 2014 | Haleakala | Pan-STARRS 1 | · | 820 m | MPC · JPL |
| 641200 | 2003 FC_{136} | — | January 23, 2014 | Kitt Peak | Spacewatch | · | 2.8 km | MPC · JPL |

== 641201–641300 ==
back to top

| Designation | | | Discovery | | | Properties | | Ref |
| Permanent | Provisional | Named after | Date | Site | Discoverer(s) | Category | Diam. | Ref |
|---|---|---|---|---|---|---|---|---|
| 641201 | 2003 FY_{136} | — | April 28, 2012 | Mount Lemmon | Mount Lemmon Survey | · | 860 m | MPC · JPL |
| 641202 | 2003 FA_{137} | — | April 29, 2014 | Haleakala | Pan-STARRS 1 | · | 860 m | MPC · JPL |
| 641203 | 2003 FC_{138} | — | October 20, 2008 | Mount Lemmon | Mount Lemmon Survey | · | 980 m | MPC · JPL |
| 641204 | 2003 FS_{138} | — | October 15, 2009 | Kitt Peak | Spacewatch | · | 1.5 km | MPC · JPL |
| 641205 | 2003 FT_{138} | — | June 20, 2015 | Haleakala | Pan-STARRS 1 | NYS | 820 m | MPC · JPL |
| 641206 | 2003 FS_{139} | — | November 12, 2010 | Mount Lemmon | Mount Lemmon Survey | L4 | 9.5 km | MPC · JPL |
| 641207 | 2003 FZ_{139} | — | December 1, 2005 | Mount Lemmon | Mount Lemmon Survey | MAS | 570 m | MPC · JPL |
| 641208 | 2003 FA_{140} | — | September 14, 2006 | Kitt Peak | Spacewatch | THM | 1.6 km | MPC · JPL |
| 641209 | 2003 FN_{140} | — | January 4, 2017 | Haleakala | Pan-STARRS 1 | · | 650 m | MPC · JPL |
| 641210 | 2003 FT_{140} | — | December 27, 2011 | Mount Lemmon | Mount Lemmon Survey | L4 | 8.6 km | MPC · JPL |
| 641211 | 2003 FH_{141} | — | March 24, 2003 | Kitt Peak | Spacewatch | · | 2.3 km | MPC · JPL |
| 641212 | 2003 GQ_{21} | — | March 24, 2003 | Kitt Peak | Spacewatch | H | 390 m | MPC · JPL |
| 641213 | 2003 GS_{31} | — | April 5, 2003 | Kitt Peak | Spacewatch | · | 2.1 km | MPC · JPL |
| 641214 | 2003 GD_{33} | — | April 2, 2003 | Cerro Tololo | Deep Lens Survey | EOS | 1.4 km | MPC · JPL |
| 641215 | 2003 GS_{33} | — | April 5, 2003 | Cerro Tololo | Deep Lens Survey | · | 1.1 km | MPC · JPL |
| 641216 | 2003 GR_{45} | — | April 9, 2003 | Kitt Peak | Spacewatch | · | 930 m | MPC · JPL |
| 641217 | 2003 GN_{47} | — | March 22, 2003 | Palomar | NEAT | · | 1.3 km | MPC · JPL |
| 641218 | 2003 GU_{48} | — | April 9, 2003 | Palomar | NEAT | · | 1.7 km | MPC · JPL |
| 641219 | 2003 GV_{50} | — | April 9, 2003 | Socorro | LINEAR | · | 1.1 km | MPC · JPL |
| 641220 | 2003 GH_{58} | — | December 28, 2005 | Kitt Peak | Spacewatch | · | 1.0 km | MPC · JPL |
| 641221 | 2003 GP_{58} | — | December 28, 2011 | Mount Lemmon | Mount Lemmon Survey | L4 | 7.4 km | MPC · JPL |
| 641222 | 2003 GX_{58} | — | May 28, 2014 | Haleakala | Pan-STARRS 1 | V | 510 m | MPC · JPL |
| 641223 | 2003 GC_{59} | — | May 24, 2015 | Kitt Peak | Spacewatch | VER | 2.2 km | MPC · JPL |
| 641224 | 2003 GD_{59} | — | April 11, 2003 | Kitt Peak | Spacewatch | · | 1.3 km | MPC · JPL |
| 641225 | 2003 GZ_{59} | — | July 5, 2016 | Haleakala | Pan-STARRS 1 | · | 2.6 km | MPC · JPL |
| 641226 | 2003 GF_{60} | — | November 6, 2008 | Mount Lemmon | Mount Lemmon Survey | V | 560 m | MPC · JPL |
| 641227 | 2003 GQ_{62} | — | February 1, 1995 | Kitt Peak | Spacewatch | NYS | 1.0 km | MPC · JPL |
| 641228 | 2003 GV_{62} | — | June 27, 2015 | Haleakala | Pan-STARRS 1 | V | 520 m | MPC · JPL |
| 641229 | 2003 GC_{63} | — | February 22, 2017 | Mount Lemmon | Mount Lemmon Survey | · | 780 m | MPC · JPL |
| 641230 | 2003 GG_{63} | — | August 1, 2017 | Haleakala | Pan-STARRS 1 | · | 2.6 km | MPC · JPL |
| 641231 | 2003 GT_{63} | — | February 7, 2008 | Mount Lemmon | Mount Lemmon Survey | · | 2.0 km | MPC · JPL |
| 641232 | 2003 GV_{63} | — | January 28, 2007 | Kitt Peak | Spacewatch | (5) | 1.1 km | MPC · JPL |
| 641233 | 2003 GX_{63} | — | January 1, 2008 | Mount Lemmon | Mount Lemmon Survey | EUP | 2.5 km | MPC · JPL |
| 641234 | 2003 GJ_{64} | — | April 5, 2003 | Kitt Peak | Spacewatch | L4 | 8.7 km | MPC · JPL |
| 641235 | 2003 GM_{64} | — | February 27, 2014 | Mount Lemmon | Mount Lemmon Survey | L4 | 7.8 km | MPC · JPL |
| 641236 | 2003 GV_{64} | — | January 29, 2014 | Kitt Peak | Spacewatch | · | 2.7 km | MPC · JPL |
| 641237 | 2003 GE_{65} | — | October 27, 2005 | Mount Lemmon | Mount Lemmon Survey | · | 520 m | MPC · JPL |
| 641238 | 2003 GF_{65} | — | April 4, 2003 | Kitt Peak | Spacewatch | NYS | 780 m | MPC · JPL |
| 641239 | 2003 GP_{65} | — | January 27, 2007 | Kitt Peak | Spacewatch | · | 1.2 km | MPC · JPL |
| 641240 | 2003 GB_{66} | — | April 9, 2003 | Palomar | NEAT | · | 1.1 km | MPC · JPL |
| 641241 | 2003 GC_{66} | — | April 5, 2003 | Kitt Peak | Spacewatch | · | 1.1 km | MPC · JPL |
| 641242 | 2003 GL_{66} | — | April 8, 2003 | Kitt Peak | Spacewatch | · | 1.4 km | MPC · JPL |
| 641243 | 2003 GX_{66} | — | April 7, 2003 | Kitt Peak | Spacewatch | · | 1.6 km | MPC · JPL |
| 641244 | 2003 GY_{66} | — | April 1, 2003 | Apache Point | SDSS Collaboration | ARM | 2.7 km | MPC · JPL |
| 641245 | 2003 GK_{67} | — | April 1, 2003 | Apache Point | SDSS Collaboration | EOS | 1.8 km | MPC · JPL |
| 641246 | 2003 HA_{11} | — | April 1, 2003 | Palomar | NEAT | · | 3.2 km | MPC · JPL |
| 641247 | 2003 HA_{18} | — | April 25, 2003 | Kitt Peak | Spacewatch | · | 2.1 km | MPC · JPL |
| 641248 | 2003 HK_{26} | — | April 26, 2003 | Kitt Peak | Spacewatch | · | 1.2 km | MPC · JPL |
| 641249 | 2003 HM_{29} | — | April 28, 2003 | Anderson Mesa | LONEOS | · | 1.4 km | MPC · JPL |
| 641250 | 2003 HA_{35} | — | April 26, 2003 | Kitt Peak | Spacewatch | MAS | 690 m | MPC · JPL |
| 641251 | 2003 HV_{55} | — | April 4, 2003 | Kitt Peak | Spacewatch | EOS | 1.7 km | MPC · JPL |
| 641252 | 2003 HE_{58} | — | January 24, 2006 | Kitt Peak | Spacewatch | · | 840 m | MPC · JPL |
| 641253 | 2003 HP_{59} | — | September 2, 2008 | Kitt Peak | Spacewatch | · | 870 m | MPC · JPL |
| 641254 | 2003 HF_{61} | — | September 18, 2010 | Charleston | R. Holmes | · | 630 m | MPC · JPL |
| 641255 | 2003 HR_{61} | — | March 22, 2014 | Mount Lemmon | Mount Lemmon Survey | · | 2.5 km | MPC · JPL |
| 641256 | 2003 HU_{61} | — | May 15, 2012 | Haleakala | Pan-STARRS 1 | · | 1.7 km | MPC · JPL |
| 641257 | 2003 HV_{61} | — | May 21, 2014 | Haleakala | Pan-STARRS 1 | · | 850 m | MPC · JPL |
| 641258 | 2003 HA_{63} | — | April 30, 2003 | Kitt Peak | Spacewatch | · | 2.1 km | MPC · JPL |
| 641259 | 2003 HJ_{63} | — | August 2, 2016 | Haleakala | Pan-STARRS 1 | (69559) | 2.6 km | MPC · JPL |
| 641260 | 2003 HL_{63} | — | April 30, 2014 | Haleakala | Pan-STARRS 1 | · | 910 m | MPC · JPL |
| 641261 | 2003 HV_{64} | — | November 19, 2006 | Kitt Peak | Spacewatch | · | 2.2 km | MPC · JPL |
| 641262 | 2003 HH_{65} | — | November 8, 2009 | Mount Lemmon | Mount Lemmon Survey | · | 1.7 km | MPC · JPL |
| 641263 | 2003 JX_{18} | — | October 25, 2009 | Kitt Peak | Spacewatch | · | 1.6 km | MPC · JPL |
| 641264 | 2003 KP_{5} | — | May 23, 2003 | Kitt Peak | Spacewatch | · | 1.1 km | MPC · JPL |
| 641265 | 2003 KP_{6} | — | April 29, 2003 | Kitt Peak | Spacewatch | · | 1.0 km | MPC · JPL |
| 641266 | 2003 KP_{11} | — | June 12, 2015 | Mount Lemmon | Mount Lemmon Survey | VER | 2.3 km | MPC · JPL |
| 641267 | 2003 KZ_{16} | — | May 28, 2003 | Socorro | LINEAR | T_{j} (2.97) · EUP | 3.7 km | MPC · JPL |
| 641268 | 2003 KT_{18} | — | May 25, 2003 | Reedy Creek | J. Broughton | · | 2.1 km | MPC · JPL |
| 641269 | 2003 KM_{27} | — | May 30, 2003 | Cerro Tololo | Deep Ecliptic Survey | · | 2.3 km | MPC · JPL |
| 641270 | 2003 KD_{33} | — | April 30, 2003 | Kitt Peak | Spacewatch | (18466) | 1.9 km | MPC · JPL |
| 641271 | 2003 KT_{37} | — | May 25, 2003 | Kitt Peak | Spacewatch | · | 560 m | MPC · JPL |
| 641272 | 2003 KW_{37} | — | April 27, 2012 | Haleakala | Pan-STARRS 1 | · | 1.9 km | MPC · JPL |
| 641273 | 2003 KR_{38} | — | September 4, 2010 | Mount Lemmon | Mount Lemmon Survey | · | 490 m | MPC · JPL |
| 641274 | 2003 KZ_{38} | — | May 30, 2015 | Haleakala | Pan-STARRS 1 | · | 990 m | MPC · JPL |
| 641275 | 2003 KG_{40} | — | May 5, 2003 | Kitt Peak | Spacewatch | · | 1.5 km | MPC · JPL |
| 641276 | 2003 KH_{40} | — | October 12, 2013 | Kitt Peak | Spacewatch | · | 1.8 km | MPC · JPL |
| 641277 | 2003 LJ_{10} | — | January 26, 2017 | Haleakala | Pan-STARRS 1 | · | 1.3 km | MPC · JPL |
| 641278 | 2003 LQ_{10} | — | October 5, 2013 | Haleakala | Pan-STARRS 1 | · | 1.7 km | MPC · JPL |
| 641279 | 2003 LA_{11} | — | September 30, 2013 | Catalina | CSS | · | 1.7 km | MPC · JPL |
| 641280 | 2003 LD_{11} | — | May 7, 2014 | Haleakala | Pan-STARRS 1 | · | 2.1 km | MPC · JPL |
| 641281 | 2003 LG_{11} | — | February 21, 2017 | Haleakala | Pan-STARRS 1 | MAS | 610 m | MPC · JPL |
| 641282 | 2003 LL_{11} | — | May 2, 2014 | Kitt Peak | Spacewatch | · | 970 m | MPC · JPL |
| 641283 | 2003 NY_{6} | — | July 9, 2003 | Piszkéstető | K. Sárneczky, B. Sipőcz | · | 500 m | MPC · JPL |
| 641284 | 2003 NP_{10} | — | July 3, 2003 | Kitt Peak | Spacewatch | · | 1.7 km | MPC · JPL |
| 641285 | 2003 NF_{13} | — | July 9, 2003 | Campo Imperatore | CINEOS | fast | 1.4 km | MPC · JPL |
| 641286 | 2003 NW_{13} | — | April 1, 2014 | Mount Lemmon | Mount Lemmon Survey | · | 1.0 km | MPC · JPL |
| 641287 | 2003 NC_{14} | — | May 6, 2016 | Haleakala | Pan-STARRS 1 | · | 1.6 km | MPC · JPL |
| 641288 | 2003 NM_{14} | — | February 9, 2013 | Haleakala | Pan-STARRS 1 | V | 550 m | MPC · JPL |
| 641289 | 2003 NR_{14} | — | September 13, 2007 | Mount Lemmon | Mount Lemmon Survey | NYS | 940 m | MPC · JPL |
| 641290 | 2003 NU_{14} | — | July 30, 2008 | Kitt Peak | Spacewatch | · | 1.5 km | MPC · JPL |
| 641291 | 2003 OF | — | July 18, 2003 | Siding Spring | G. J. Garradd, R. H. McNaught | · | 3.0 km | MPC · JPL |
| 641292 | 2003 OW_{11} | — | July 21, 2003 | Palomar | NEAT | MAR | 1.3 km | MPC · JPL |
| 641293 | 2003 QM_{9} | — | July 24, 2003 | Palomar | NEAT | · | 610 m | MPC · JPL |
| 641294 | 2003 QZ_{12} | — | August 22, 2003 | Palomar | NEAT | · | 1.6 km | MPC · JPL |
| 641295 | 2003 QH_{23} | — | August 20, 2003 | Palomar | NEAT | · | 700 m | MPC · JPL |
| 641296 | 2003 QR_{28} | — | August 22, 2003 | Campo Imperatore | CINEOS | MAS | 630 m | MPC · JPL |
| 641297 | 2003 QN_{45} | — | August 23, 2003 | Palomar | NEAT | · | 4.7 km | MPC · JPL |
| 641298 | 2003 QW_{47} | — | August 20, 2003 | Palomar | NEAT | · | 2.1 km | MPC · JPL |
| 641299 | 2003 QN_{49} | — | August 22, 2003 | Palomar | NEAT | · | 1.0 km | MPC · JPL |
| 641300 | 2003 QX_{69} | — | August 26, 2003 | Piszkéstető | K. Sárneczky, B. Sipőcz | · | 830 m | MPC · JPL |

== 641301–641400 ==
back to top

| Designation | | | Discovery | | | Properties | | Ref |
| Permanent | Provisional | Named after | Date | Site | Discoverer(s) | Category | Diam. | Ref |
|---|---|---|---|---|---|---|---|---|
| 641301 | 2003 QW_{70} | — | August 23, 2003 | Palomar | NEAT | · | 1.2 km | MPC · JPL |
| 641302 | 2003 QF_{76} | — | July 24, 2003 | Palomar | NEAT | · | 1.0 km | MPC · JPL |
| 641303 | 2003 QL_{80} | — | August 22, 2003 | Palomar | NEAT | · | 1.7 km | MPC · JPL |
| 641304 | 2003 QS_{98} | — | August 30, 2003 | Kitt Peak | Spacewatch | · | 1.6 km | MPC · JPL |
| 641305 | 2003 QA_{108} | — | August 31, 2003 | Haleakala | NEAT | · | 2.0 km | MPC · JPL |
| 641306 | 2003 QG_{120} | — | August 23, 2003 | Mauna Kea | Gwyn, S. | · | 1.6 km | MPC · JPL |
| 641307 | 2003 QO_{120} | — | August 23, 2003 | Palomar | NEAT | · | 710 m | MPC · JPL |
| 641308 | 2003 QN_{122} | — | August 23, 2003 | Palomar | NEAT | · | 540 m | MPC · JPL |
| 641309 | 2003 QS_{123} | — | August 23, 2003 | Palomar | NEAT | · | 1.7 km | MPC · JPL |
| 641310 | 2003 QE_{124} | — | March 3, 2009 | Mount Lemmon | Mount Lemmon Survey | · | 890 m | MPC · JPL |
| 641311 | 2003 QP_{125} | — | October 24, 2003 | Kitt Peak | Deep Ecliptic Survey | · | 1.4 km | MPC · JPL |
| 641312 | 2003 QX_{125} | — | September 26, 2006 | Mount Lemmon | Mount Lemmon Survey | · | 900 m | MPC · JPL |
| 641313 | 2003 RC_{3} | — | August 28, 2003 | Palomar | NEAT | · | 1.1 km | MPC · JPL |
| 641314 | 2003 RJ_{9} | — | August 28, 2003 | Palomar | NEAT | EOS | 1.8 km | MPC · JPL |
| 641315 | 2003 SB_{41} | — | September 17, 2003 | Palomar | NEAT | · | 740 m | MPC · JPL |
| 641316 | 2003 SO_{79} | — | September 19, 2003 | Kitt Peak | Spacewatch | T_{j} (2.97) · 3:2 | 7.2 km | MPC · JPL |
| 641317 | 2003 SK_{89} | — | September 18, 2003 | Palomar | NEAT | · | 1.7 km | MPC · JPL |
| 641318 | 2003 SQ_{113} | — | September 16, 2003 | Kitt Peak | Spacewatch | · | 1.6 km | MPC · JPL |
| 641319 | 2003 SL_{119} | — | August 22, 2003 | Palomar | NEAT | NYS | 1.1 km | MPC · JPL |
| 641320 | 2003 SK_{127} | — | September 18, 2003 | Palomar | NEAT | MAR | 1.4 km | MPC · JPL |
| 641321 | 2003 SL_{127} | — | September 21, 2003 | Kitt Peak | Spacewatch | · | 1.5 km | MPC · JPL |
| 641322 | 2003 SQ_{127} | — | September 21, 2003 | Socorro | LINEAR | · | 2.1 km | MPC · JPL |
| 641323 | 2003 SY_{185} | — | September 23, 2003 | Palomar | NEAT | H | 370 m | MPC · JPL |
| 641324 | 2003 SP_{186} | — | September 23, 2003 | Palomar | NEAT | · | 750 m | MPC · JPL |
| 641325 | 2003 SS_{189} | — | September 20, 2003 | Kitt Peak | Spacewatch | · | 1.5 km | MPC · JPL |
| 641326 | 2003 SF_{207} | — | September 18, 2003 | Palomar | NEAT | · | 3.3 km | MPC · JPL |
| 641327 | 2003 SX_{209} | — | September 25, 2003 | Haleakala | NEAT | (18466) | 2.4 km | MPC · JPL |
| 641328 | 2003 SD_{215} | — | September 26, 2003 | Prescott | P. G. Comba | · | 510 m | MPC · JPL |
| 641329 | 2003 ST_{234} | — | September 25, 2003 | Haleakala | NEAT | · | 1.2 km | MPC · JPL |
| 641330 | 2003 SE_{263} | — | September 19, 2003 | Palomar | NEAT | · | 2.2 km | MPC · JPL |
| 641331 | 2003 ST_{264} | — | September 28, 2003 | Socorro | LINEAR | NYS | 1.1 km | MPC · JPL |
| 641332 | 2003 SY_{278} | — | September 30, 2003 | Kitt Peak | Spacewatch | · | 440 m | MPC · JPL |
| 641333 | 2003 SS_{323} | — | September 16, 2003 | Kitt Peak | Spacewatch | · | 1.1 km | MPC · JPL |
| 641334 | 2003 SW_{336} | — | September 27, 2003 | Apache Point | SDSS Collaboration | · | 600 m | MPC · JPL |
| 641335 | 2003 SA_{343} | — | September 17, 2003 | Kitt Peak | Spacewatch | · | 2.8 km | MPC · JPL |
| 641336 | 2003 SK_{348} | — | September 18, 2003 | Kitt Peak | Spacewatch | · | 1.1 km | MPC · JPL |
| 641337 | 2003 SH_{359} | — | September 21, 2003 | Kitt Peak | Spacewatch | · | 490 m | MPC · JPL |
| 641338 | 2003 SX_{360} | — | September 22, 2003 | Kitt Peak | Spacewatch | · | 450 m | MPC · JPL |
| 641339 | 2003 SB_{361} | — | September 22, 2003 | Kitt Peak | Spacewatch | · | 550 m | MPC · JPL |
| 641340 | 2003 SF_{361} | — | September 22, 2003 | Kitt Peak | Spacewatch | · | 530 m | MPC · JPL |
| 641341 | 2003 SA_{366} | — | September 28, 2003 | Kitt Peak | Spacewatch | · | 1.1 km | MPC · JPL |
| 641342 | 2003 SK_{372} | — | March 9, 2005 | Mount Lemmon | Mount Lemmon Survey | · | 770 m | MPC · JPL |
| 641343 | 2003 ST_{375} | — | September 26, 2003 | Apache Point | SDSS Collaboration | · | 1.5 km | MPC · JPL |
| 641344 | 2003 SV_{378} | — | March 21, 2002 | Kitt Peak | Spacewatch | · | 1.4 km | MPC · JPL |
| 641345 | 2003 SY_{380} | — | September 26, 2003 | Apache Point | SDSS Collaboration | KOR | 1.0 km | MPC · JPL |
| 641346 | 2003 SM_{385} | — | September 26, 2003 | Apache Point | SDSS Collaboration | KOR | 1.1 km | MPC · JPL |
| 641347 | 2003 SV_{386} | — | September 26, 2003 | Apache Point | SDSS Collaboration | · | 510 m | MPC · JPL |
| 641348 | 2003 SM_{388} | — | September 26, 2003 | Apache Point | SDSS Collaboration | · | 2.9 km | MPC · JPL |
| 641349 | 2003 SR_{388} | — | September 19, 2003 | Palomar | NEAT | NYS | 960 m | MPC · JPL |
| 641350 | 2003 SB_{393} | — | September 26, 2003 | Apache Point | SDSS Collaboration | · | 1.5 km | MPC · JPL |
| 641351 | 2003 SQ_{395} | — | September 26, 2003 | Apache Point | SDSS Collaboration | · | 1.7 km | MPC · JPL |
| 641352 | 2003 SM_{397} | — | September 26, 2003 | Apache Point | SDSS Collaboration | · | 1.8 km | MPC · JPL |
| 641353 | 2003 SJ_{400} | — | September 26, 2003 | Apache Point | SDSS Collaboration | · | 2.1 km | MPC · JPL |
| 641354 | 2003 SG_{403} | — | September 27, 2003 | Kitt Peak | Spacewatch | · | 2.1 km | MPC · JPL |
| 641355 | 2003 SP_{407} | — | September 27, 2003 | Apache Point | SDSS Collaboration | · | 460 m | MPC · JPL |
| 641356 | 2003 SF_{411} | — | September 28, 2003 | Apache Point | SDSS Collaboration | · | 1.5 km | MPC · JPL |
| 641357 | 2003 SS_{412} | — | September 18, 2003 | Kitt Peak | Spacewatch | · | 840 m | MPC · JPL |
| 641358 | 2003 SR_{414} | — | September 28, 2003 | Apache Point | SDSS Collaboration | · | 830 m | MPC · JPL |
| 641359 | 2003 SR_{424} | — | September 25, 2003 | Mauna Kea | P. A. Wiegert | · | 960 m | MPC · JPL |
| 641360 | 2003 SS_{427} | — | September 30, 2003 | Apache Point | SDSS Collaboration | · | 1.2 km | MPC · JPL |
| 641361 | 2003 SL_{428} | — | September 18, 2003 | Kitt Peak | Spacewatch | · | 1.3 km | MPC · JPL |
| 641362 | 2003 SK_{436} | — | September 18, 2003 | Kitt Peak | Spacewatch | · | 920 m | MPC · JPL |
| 641363 | 2003 SZ_{437} | — | September 18, 2003 | Kitt Peak | Spacewatch | · | 690 m | MPC · JPL |
| 641364 | 2003 SM_{438} | — | September 16, 2009 | Kitt Peak | Spacewatch | LUT | 4.0 km | MPC · JPL |
| 641365 | 2003 SB_{439} | — | September 20, 2003 | Kitt Peak | Spacewatch | · | 1.8 km | MPC · JPL |
| 641366 | 2003 SM_{440} | — | September 4, 2013 | Mount Lemmon | Mount Lemmon Survey | KOR | 1.1 km | MPC · JPL |
| 641367 | 2003 SQ_{440} | — | September 20, 2003 | Kitt Peak | Spacewatch | · | 1.8 km | MPC · JPL |
| 641368 | 2003 SS_{440} | — | October 10, 2008 | Kitt Peak | Spacewatch | KOR | 1.0 km | MPC · JPL |
| 641369 | 2003 SQ_{441} | — | December 22, 2008 | Kitt Peak | Spacewatch | · | 1.0 km | MPC · JPL |
| 641370 | 2003 SZ_{441} | — | September 17, 2009 | Kitt Peak | Spacewatch | THB | 2.7 km | MPC · JPL |
| 641371 | 2003 ST_{443} | — | October 1, 2008 | Kitt Peak | Spacewatch | · | 1.4 km | MPC · JPL |
| 641372 | 2003 SH_{444} | — | September 20, 2003 | Campo Imperatore | CINEOS | · | 570 m | MPC · JPL |
| 641373 | 2003 SD_{449} | — | February 15, 2013 | Haleakala | Pan-STARRS 1 | (194) | 790 m | MPC · JPL |
| 641374 | 2003 SR_{451} | — | September 26, 2003 | Apache Point | SDSS Collaboration | · | 1.9 km | MPC · JPL |
| 641375 | 2003 SB_{452} | — | May 1, 2006 | Kitt Peak | Spacewatch | PHO | 780 m | MPC · JPL |
| 641376 | 2003 SZ_{453} | — | September 10, 2013 | Haleakala | Pan-STARRS 1 | · | 1.9 km | MPC · JPL |
| 641377 | 2003 SB_{454} | — | December 21, 2014 | Haleakala | Pan-STARRS 1 | · | 1.9 km | MPC · JPL |
| 641378 | 2003 SZ_{457} | — | June 29, 2016 | Haleakala | Pan-STARRS 1 | · | 550 m | MPC · JPL |
| 641379 | 2003 SB_{459} | — | March 23, 2015 | Kitt Peak | Wasserman, L. H., M. W. Buie | AGN | 930 m | MPC · JPL |
| 641380 | 2003 SS_{459} | — | October 14, 2017 | Mount Lemmon | Mount Lemmon Survey | · | 1.9 km | MPC · JPL |
| 641381 | 2003 SM_{461} | — | September 17, 2003 | Kitt Peak | Spacewatch | · | 500 m | MPC · JPL |
| 641382 | 2003 SS_{462} | — | January 26, 2017 | Mount Lemmon | Mount Lemmon Survey | NYS | 1.1 km | MPC · JPL |
| 641383 | 2003 SX_{464} | — | September 22, 2003 | Palomar | NEAT | · | 940 m | MPC · JPL |
| 641384 | 2003 SG_{466} | — | September 20, 2003 | Kitt Peak | Spacewatch | · | 590 m | MPC · JPL |
| 641385 | 2003 SM_{466} | — | September 18, 2003 | Kitt Peak | Spacewatch | · | 590 m | MPC · JPL |
| 641386 | 2003 SJ_{467} | — | September 18, 2003 | Kitt Peak | Spacewatch | KOR | 950 m | MPC · JPL |
| 641387 | 2003 SK_{474} | — | September 22, 2003 | Kitt Peak | Spacewatch | · | 860 m | MPC · JPL |
| 641388 | 2003 SM_{476} | — | September 28, 2003 | Kitt Peak | Spacewatch | · | 1.3 km | MPC · JPL |
| 641389 | 2003 TQ_{4} | — | October 1, 2003 | Kitt Peak | Spacewatch | EOS | 1.5 km | MPC · JPL |
| 641390 | 2003 TG_{22} | — | October 1, 2003 | Kitt Peak | Spacewatch | · | 2.1 km | MPC · JPL |
| 641391 | 2003 TH_{53} | — | October 5, 2003 | Kitt Peak | Spacewatch | · | 500 m | MPC · JPL |
| 641392 | 2003 TN_{60} | — | October 4, 2003 | Kitt Peak | Spacewatch | HOF | 2.3 km | MPC · JPL |
| 641393 | 2003 TL_{61} | — | September 23, 2008 | Kitt Peak | Spacewatch | · | 1.8 km | MPC · JPL |
| 641394 | 2003 TN_{62} | — | February 22, 2017 | Haleakala | Pan-STARRS 1 | · | 1.2 km | MPC · JPL |
| 641395 | 2003 TE_{63} | — | November 26, 2014 | Haleakala | Pan-STARRS 1 | · | 1.9 km | MPC · JPL |
| 641396 | 2003 TU_{63} | — | February 16, 2015 | Haleakala | Pan-STARRS 1 | · | 1.8 km | MPC · JPL |
| 641397 | 2003 TR_{65} | — | October 2, 2003 | Kitt Peak | Spacewatch | · | 3.0 km | MPC · JPL |
| 641398 | 2003 TA_{66} | — | October 4, 2003 | Kitt Peak | Spacewatch | H | 390 m | MPC · JPL |
| 641399 | 2003 UX_{15} | — | October 16, 2003 | Palomar | NEAT | · | 780 m | MPC · JPL |
| 641400 | 2003 UY_{23} | — | October 21, 2003 | Needville | J. Dellinger | · | 710 m | MPC · JPL |

== 641401–641500 ==
back to top

| Designation | | | Discovery | | | Properties | | Ref |
| Permanent | Provisional | Named after | Date | Site | Discoverer(s) | Category | Diam. | Ref |
|---|---|---|---|---|---|---|---|---|
| 641401 | 2003 UQ_{59} | — | October 19, 2003 | Palomar | NEAT | · | 2.7 km | MPC · JPL |
| 641402 | 2003 US_{71} | — | October 19, 2003 | Kitt Peak | Spacewatch | · | 490 m | MPC · JPL |
| 641403 | 2003 UG_{76} | — | September 16, 2003 | Palomar | NEAT | · | 740 m | MPC · JPL |
| 641404 | 2003 UQ_{107} | — | October 19, 2003 | Kitt Peak | Spacewatch | · | 780 m | MPC · JPL |
| 641405 | 2003 UD_{111} | — | October 19, 2003 | Haleakala | NEAT | · | 2.0 km | MPC · JPL |
| 641406 | 2003 UD_{112} | — | October 20, 2003 | Kitt Peak | Spacewatch | · | 630 m | MPC · JPL |
| 641407 | 2003 UE_{137} | — | September 22, 2003 | Palomar | NEAT | · | 740 m | MPC · JPL |
| 641408 | 2003 UO_{156} | — | October 20, 2003 | Kitt Peak | Spacewatch | · | 1.2 km | MPC · JPL |
| 641409 | 2003 UH_{157} | — | October 20, 2003 | Kitt Peak | Spacewatch | · | 960 m | MPC · JPL |
| 641410 | 2003 UN_{169} | — | October 22, 2003 | Kitt Peak | Spacewatch | MAS | 610 m | MPC · JPL |
| 641411 | 2003 UB_{173} | — | October 15, 2003 | Anderson Mesa | LONEOS | · | 1.5 km | MPC · JPL |
| 641412 | 2003 UQ_{221} | — | October 22, 2003 | Kitt Peak | Spacewatch | NYS | 1.1 km | MPC · JPL |
| 641413 | 2003 UZ_{268} | — | October 28, 2003 | Kitt Peak | Spacewatch | · | 830 m | MPC · JPL |
| 641414 | 2003 UL_{271} | — | September 22, 2003 | Kitt Peak | Spacewatch | · | 1.4 km | MPC · JPL |
| 641415 | 2003 UC_{286} | — | October 19, 2003 | Kitt Peak | Spacewatch | · | 1.5 km | MPC · JPL |
| 641416 | 2003 US_{320} | — | October 23, 2003 | Anderson Mesa | LONEOS | · | 1.5 km | MPC · JPL |
| 641417 | 2003 UJ_{329} | — | October 17, 2003 | Kitt Peak | Spacewatch | · | 1.0 km | MPC · JPL |
| 641418 | 2003 UO_{341} | — | July 20, 2003 | Palomar | NEAT | · | 1.7 km | MPC · JPL |
| 641419 | 2003 UM_{342} | — | September 22, 2003 | Kitt Peak | Spacewatch | · | 2.7 km | MPC · JPL |
| 641420 | 2003 UB_{345} | — | October 19, 2003 | Apache Point | SDSS Collaboration | · | 1.6 km | MPC · JPL |
| 641421 | 2003 UT_{346} | — | September 29, 2003 | Kitt Peak | Spacewatch | · | 1.3 km | MPC · JPL |
| 641422 | 2003 US_{348} | — | October 19, 2003 | Apache Point | SDSS Collaboration | · | 860 m | MPC · JPL |
| 641423 | 2003 UZ_{349} | — | October 19, 2003 | Apache Point | SDSS | · | 990 m | MPC · JPL |
| 641424 | 2003 UR_{354} | — | October 19, 2003 | Apache Point | SDSS | · | 1.7 km | MPC · JPL |
| 641425 | 2003 UE_{363} | — | October 20, 2003 | Kitt Peak | Spacewatch | · | 570 m | MPC · JPL |
| 641426 | 2003 UM_{365} | — | October 20, 2003 | Kitt Peak | Spacewatch | · | 2.1 km | MPC · JPL |
| 641427 | 2003 US_{372} | — | September 17, 2003 | Kitt Peak | Spacewatch | · | 1.0 km | MPC · JPL |
| 641428 | 2003 UU_{381} | — | October 22, 2003 | Apache Point | SDSS | · | 1.4 km | MPC · JPL |
| 641429 | 2003 UE_{391} | — | October 22, 2003 | Apache Point | SDSS Collaboration | · | 1.6 km | MPC · JPL |
| 641430 | 2003 UA_{399} | — | October 22, 2003 | Apache Point | SDSS Collaboration | · | 2.3 km | MPC · JPL |
| 641431 | 2003 UP_{405} | — | October 23, 2003 | Apache Point | SDSS Collaboration | · | 1.7 km | MPC · JPL |
| 641432 | 2003 UN_{408} | — | October 23, 2003 | Apache Point | SDSS | · | 3.1 km | MPC · JPL |
| 641433 | 2003 UA_{409} | — | October 23, 2003 | Apache Point | SDSS Collaboration | · | 1.8 km | MPC · JPL |
| 641434 | 2003 UJ_{415} | — | October 27, 2003 | Kitt Peak | Spacewatch | · | 600 m | MPC · JPL |
| 641435 | 2003 UL_{419} | — | October 27, 2003 | Kitt Peak | Spacewatch | · | 510 m | MPC · JPL |
| 641436 | 2003 UD_{421} | — | August 28, 2006 | Catalina | CSS | · | 570 m | MPC · JPL |
| 641437 | 2003 UF_{421} | — | December 18, 2009 | Mount Lemmon | Mount Lemmon Survey | · | 2.9 km | MPC · JPL |
| 641438 | 2003 UD_{422} | — | October 20, 2003 | Kitt Peak | Spacewatch | · | 960 m | MPC · JPL |
| 641439 | 2003 UG_{425} | — | October 23, 2003 | Kitt Peak | Spacewatch | · | 540 m | MPC · JPL |
| 641440 | 2003 US_{425} | — | September 17, 2012 | Mount Lemmon | Mount Lemmon Survey | · | 1.7 km | MPC · JPL |
| 641441 | 2003 UJ_{427} | — | November 19, 2008 | Kitt Peak | Spacewatch | · | 1.5 km | MPC · JPL |
| 641442 | 2003 UL_{427} | — | October 19, 2003 | Apache Point | SDSS Collaboration | · | 2.0 km | MPC · JPL |
| 641443 | 2003 UK_{428} | — | October 17, 2003 | Kitt Peak | Spacewatch | · | 550 m | MPC · JPL |
| 641444 | 2003 UM_{428} | — | October 2, 2013 | Kitt Peak | Spacewatch | · | 590 m | MPC · JPL |
| 641445 | 2003 UU_{436} | — | October 30, 2007 | Mount Lemmon | Mount Lemmon Survey | · | 760 m | MPC · JPL |
| 641446 | 2003 UZ_{438} | — | October 29, 2003 | Kitt Peak | Spacewatch | · | 690 m | MPC · JPL |
| 641447 | 2003 UB_{439} | — | October 22, 2003 | Kitt Peak | Spacewatch | · | 1.1 km | MPC · JPL |
| 641448 | 2003 UL_{439} | — | March 21, 2015 | Haleakala | Pan-STARRS 1 | · | 490 m | MPC · JPL |
| 641449 | 2003 UB_{440} | — | October 25, 2003 | Kitt Peak | Spacewatch | · | 1.6 km | MPC · JPL |
| 641450 | 2003 UG_{443} | — | July 26, 2017 | Haleakala | Pan-STARRS 1 | · | 1.4 km | MPC · JPL |
| 641451 | 2003 UB_{448} | — | October 20, 2003 | Kitt Peak | Spacewatch | KOR | 1.1 km | MPC · JPL |
| 641452 | 2003 WU_{29} | — | November 18, 2003 | Kitt Peak | Spacewatch | PHO | 860 m | MPC · JPL |
| 641453 | 2003 WH_{33} | — | November 18, 2003 | Palomar | NEAT | · | 730 m | MPC · JPL |
| 641454 | 2003 WL_{82} | — | October 19, 2003 | Palomar | NEAT | · | 3.2 km | MPC · JPL |
| 641455 | 2003 WJ_{85} | — | November 10, 1999 | Kitt Peak | Spacewatch | · | 1.1 km | MPC · JPL |
| 641456 | 2003 WW_{89} | — | October 23, 2003 | Kitt Peak | Spacewatch | · | 1.7 km | MPC · JPL |
| 641457 | 2003 WC_{106} | — | November 21, 2003 | Kitt Peak | Spacewatch | · | 1.4 km | MPC · JPL |
| 641458 | 2003 WT_{107} | — | November 23, 2003 | Kitt Peak | Spacewatch | · | 860 m | MPC · JPL |
| 641459 | 2003 WA_{169} | — | October 28, 2003 | Haleakala | NEAT | · | 1.8 km | MPC · JPL |
| 641460 | 2003 WM_{182} | — | November 22, 2003 | Kitt Peak | Deep Ecliptic Survey | KOR | 950 m | MPC · JPL |
| 641461 | 2003 WD_{183} | — | November 26, 2003 | Kitt Peak | Spacewatch | · | 2.3 km | MPC · JPL |
| 641462 | 2003 WX_{195} | — | October 21, 2003 | Kitt Peak | Spacewatch | · | 1.1 km | MPC · JPL |
| 641463 | 2003 WC_{196} | — | March 13, 2005 | Kitt Peak | Spacewatch | · | 1.7 km | MPC · JPL |
| 641464 | 2003 WM_{196} | — | September 4, 2007 | Mount Lemmon | Mount Lemmon Survey | HOF | 2.5 km | MPC · JPL |
| 641465 | 2003 WZ_{196} | — | May 8, 2013 | Haleakala | Pan-STARRS 1 | · | 3.5 km | MPC · JPL |
| 641466 | 2003 WB_{199} | — | December 1, 2008 | Kitt Peak | Spacewatch | KOR | 1.1 km | MPC · JPL |
| 641467 | 2003 WG_{199} | — | November 20, 2003 | Kitt Peak | Spacewatch | · | 660 m | MPC · JPL |
| 641468 | 2003 WJ_{199} | — | January 20, 2015 | Haleakala | Pan-STARRS 1 | KOR | 1.1 km | MPC · JPL |
| 641469 | 2003 WR_{199} | — | November 20, 2003 | Kitt Peak | Spacewatch | · | 1.5 km | MPC · JPL |
| 641470 | 2003 WV_{199} | — | November 21, 2003 | Kitt Peak | Spacewatch | · | 1.2 km | MPC · JPL |
| 641471 | 2003 WE_{200} | — | March 29, 2015 | Haleakala | Pan-STARRS 1 | · | 530 m | MPC · JPL |
| 641472 | 2003 WL_{201} | — | January 30, 2011 | Mount Lemmon | Mount Lemmon Survey | · | 640 m | MPC · JPL |
| 641473 | 2003 WO_{201} | — | November 30, 2003 | Kitt Peak | Spacewatch | 615 | 1.1 km | MPC · JPL |
| 641474 | 2003 WV_{201} | — | October 18, 2012 | Haleakala | Pan-STARRS 1 | · | 1.6 km | MPC · JPL |
| 641475 | 2003 WW_{201} | — | May 16, 2013 | Mount Lemmon | Mount Lemmon Survey | PHO | 820 m | MPC · JPL |
| 641476 | 2003 WH_{202} | — | November 26, 2013 | Mount Lemmon | Mount Lemmon Survey | · | 1.5 km | MPC · JPL |
| 641477 | 2003 WJ_{202} | — | December 10, 2010 | Mount Lemmon | Mount Lemmon Survey | · | 490 m | MPC · JPL |
| 641478 | 2003 WM_{202} | — | August 15, 2006 | Palomar | NEAT | MAS | 650 m | MPC · JPL |
| 641479 | 2003 WZ_{202} | — | November 20, 2003 | Kitt Peak | Spacewatch | · | 570 m | MPC · JPL |
| 641480 | 2003 WH_{206} | — | July 30, 2017 | Haleakala | Pan-STARRS 1 | KOR | 1.2 km | MPC · JPL |
| 641481 | 2003 WO_{206} | — | November 11, 2013 | Mount Lemmon | Mount Lemmon Survey | · | 1.8 km | MPC · JPL |
| 641482 | 2003 WQ_{206} | — | October 24, 2003 | Kitt Peak | Spacewatch | · | 1.7 km | MPC · JPL |
| 641483 | 2003 WU_{206} | — | November 6, 2008 | Mount Lemmon | Mount Lemmon Survey | · | 1.2 km | MPC · JPL |
| 641484 | 2003 WQ_{207} | — | October 30, 2008 | Mount Lemmon | Mount Lemmon Survey | · | 1.8 km | MPC · JPL |
| 641485 | 2003 WN_{213} | — | March 16, 2013 | La Silla | A. Galád | · | 3.2 km | MPC · JPL |
| 641486 | 2003 WW_{214} | — | November 18, 2003 | Kitt Peak | Spacewatch | · | 1.5 km | MPC · JPL |
| 641487 | 2003 WL_{215} | — | November 19, 2003 | Kitt Peak | Spacewatch | · | 560 m | MPC · JPL |
| 641488 | 2003 WR_{215} | — | November 19, 2003 | Kitt Peak | Spacewatch | · | 1.9 km | MPC · JPL |
| 641489 | 2003 WA_{217} | — | November 24, 2003 | Kitt Peak | Spacewatch | · | 490 m | MPC · JPL |
| 641490 | 2003 XD | — | December 1, 2003 | Socorro | LINEAR | PHO | 900 m | MPC · JPL |
| 641491 | 2003 XL_{29} | — | November 19, 2003 | Kitt Peak | Spacewatch | · | 1.3 km | MPC · JPL |
| 641492 | 2003 XL_{44} | — | December 1, 2003 | Kitt Peak | Spacewatch | · | 630 m | MPC · JPL |
| 641493 | 2003 XO_{44} | — | July 14, 2013 | Haleakala | Pan-STARRS 1 | · | 560 m | MPC · JPL |
| 641494 | 2003 YZ_{1} | — | December 18, 2003 | Nashville | Clingan, R. | · | 480 m | MPC · JPL |
| 641495 | 2003 YE_{7} | — | December 17, 2003 | Kitt Peak | Spacewatch | · | 690 m | MPC · JPL |
| 641496 | 2003 YE_{108} | — | December 21, 2003 | Socorro | LINEAR | · | 990 m | MPC · JPL |
| 641497 | 2003 YX_{118} | — | May 31, 2001 | Kitt Peak | Spacewatch | HNS | 1.2 km | MPC · JPL |
| 641498 | 2003 YW_{123} | — | December 28, 2003 | Kitt Peak | Spacewatch | · | 650 m | MPC · JPL |
| 641499 | 2003 YJ_{124} | — | December 28, 2003 | Kitt Peak | Spacewatch | BAR | 1.4 km | MPC · JPL |
| 641500 | 2003 YH_{152} | — | December 29, 2003 | Kitt Peak | Spacewatch | · | 1.7 km | MPC · JPL |

== 641501–641600 ==
back to top

| Designation | | | Discovery | | | Properties | | Ref |
| Permanent | Provisional | Named after | Date | Site | Discoverer(s) | Category | Diam. | Ref |
|---|---|---|---|---|---|---|---|---|
| 641501 | 2003 YH_{173} | — | December 19, 2003 | Kitt Peak | Spacewatch | · | 1.7 km | MPC · JPL |
| 641502 | 2003 YE_{183} | — | June 5, 2014 | Haleakala | Pan-STARRS 1 | NYS | 1.3 km | MPC · JPL |
| 641503 | 2003 YL_{184} | — | January 13, 2011 | Kitt Peak | Spacewatch | · | 910 m | MPC · JPL |
| 641504 | 2003 YQ_{185} | — | January 24, 2014 | Haleakala | Pan-STARRS 1 | · | 550 m | MPC · JPL |
| 641505 | 2003 YW_{186} | — | December 4, 2016 | Mount Lemmon | Mount Lemmon Survey | · | 670 m | MPC · JPL |
| 641506 | 2003 YF_{187} | — | November 1, 2007 | Kitt Peak | Spacewatch | · | 920 m | MPC · JPL |
| 641507 | 2003 YJ_{187} | — | September 9, 2015 | Haleakala | Pan-STARRS 1 | (5) | 1.0 km | MPC · JPL |
| 641508 | 2003 YY_{187} | — | March 7, 2017 | Haleakala | Pan-STARRS 1 | · | 960 m | MPC · JPL |
| 641509 | 2003 YG_{188} | — | October 25, 2011 | Haleakala | Pan-STARRS 1 | MAR | 660 m | MPC · JPL |
| 641510 | 2003 YC_{189} | — | October 19, 2015 | Haleakala | Pan-STARRS 1 | · | 920 m | MPC · JPL |
| 641511 | 2003 YD_{189} | — | October 21, 2007 | Kitt Peak | Spacewatch | · | 860 m | MPC · JPL |
| 641512 | 2003 YR_{189} | — | November 21, 2007 | Mount Lemmon | Mount Lemmon Survey | · | 880 m | MPC · JPL |
| 641513 | 2003 YS_{189} | — | June 12, 2013 | Haleakala | Pan-STARRS 1 | · | 1.2 km | MPC · JPL |
| 641514 | 2004 AR_{15} | — | January 15, 2004 | Kitt Peak | Spacewatch | · | 2.4 km | MPC · JPL |
| 641515 | 2004 AO_{18} | — | January 15, 2004 | Kitt Peak | Spacewatch | · | 710 m | MPC · JPL |
| 641516 | 2004 AC_{20} | — | December 28, 2003 | Kitt Peak | Spacewatch | (5) | 740 m | MPC · JPL |
| 641517 | 2004 AH_{27} | — | November 6, 2007 | Mount Lemmon | Mount Lemmon Survey | · | 820 m | MPC · JPL |
| 641518 | 2004 BJ | — | January 16, 2004 | Kitt Peak | Spacewatch | · | 1.2 km | MPC · JPL |
| 641519 | 2004 BC_{7} | — | January 16, 2004 | Kitt Peak | Spacewatch | · | 1.6 km | MPC · JPL |
| 641520 | 2004 BX_{64} | — | December 21, 2003 | Kitt Peak | Spacewatch | · | 620 m | MPC · JPL |
| 641521 | 2004 BM_{87} | — | January 23, 2004 | Anderson Mesa | LONEOS | · | 1.4 km | MPC · JPL |
| 641522 | 2004 BJ_{112} | — | December 29, 2003 | Kitt Peak | Spacewatch | · | 710 m | MPC · JPL |
| 641523 | 2004 BT_{134} | — | January 18, 2004 | Kitt Peak | Spacewatch | · | 1.2 km | MPC · JPL |
| 641524 | 2004 BG_{139} | — | January 19, 2004 | Kitt Peak | Spacewatch | · | 940 m | MPC · JPL |
| 641525 | 2004 BE_{143} | — | January 19, 2004 | Kitt Peak | Spacewatch | · | 880 m | MPC · JPL |
| 641526 | 2004 BR_{144} | — | January 19, 2004 | Kitt Peak | Spacewatch | · | 1.1 km | MPC · JPL |
| 641527 | 2004 BD_{145} | — | January 19, 2004 | Kitt Peak | Spacewatch | (194) | 690 m | MPC · JPL |
| 641528 | 2004 BH_{153} | — | January 27, 2004 | Kitt Peak | Spacewatch | · | 2.7 km | MPC · JPL |
| 641529 | 2004 BE_{155} | — | January 28, 2004 | Kitt Peak | Spacewatch | · | 1.5 km | MPC · JPL |
| 641530 | 2004 BJ_{164} | — | January 30, 2004 | Kitt Peak | Spacewatch | · | 770 m | MPC · JPL |
| 641531 | 2004 BQ_{164} | — | December 29, 2011 | Mount Lemmon | Mount Lemmon Survey | · | 1.5 km | MPC · JPL |
| 641532 | 2004 BS_{164} | — | February 3, 2009 | Kitt Peak | Spacewatch | · | 1.8 km | MPC · JPL |
| 641533 | 2004 BA_{165} | — | September 19, 2012 | Mount Lemmon | Mount Lemmon Survey | · | 1.9 km | MPC · JPL |
| 641534 | 2004 BK_{165} | — | October 18, 2006 | Kitt Peak | Spacewatch | · | 540 m | MPC · JPL |
| 641535 | 2004 BF_{167} | — | January 31, 2004 | Kitt Peak | Spacewatch | (5) | 1.1 km | MPC · JPL |
| 641536 | 2004 BL_{168} | — | October 10, 2012 | Mount Lemmon | Mount Lemmon Survey | EOS | 1.4 km | MPC · JPL |
| 641537 | 2004 BC_{169} | — | February 6, 2014 | Mount Lemmon | Mount Lemmon Survey | · | 500 m | MPC · JPL |
| 641538 | 2004 BX_{169} | — | July 26, 2017 | Haleakala | Pan-STARRS 1 | · | 1.4 km | MPC · JPL |
| 641539 | 2004 BA_{170} | — | January 8, 2011 | Mount Lemmon | Mount Lemmon Survey | · | 740 m | MPC · JPL |
| 641540 | 2004 BL_{170} | — | January 30, 2011 | Mayhill-ISON | L. Elenin | · | 940 m | MPC · JPL |
| 641541 | 2004 BT_{171} | — | January 21, 2015 | Haleakala | Pan-STARRS 1 | EOS | 1.5 km | MPC · JPL |
| 641542 | 2004 BD_{172} | — | December 28, 2013 | Kitt Peak | Spacewatch | · | 550 m | MPC · JPL |
| 641543 | 2004 BF_{173} | — | January 30, 2004 | Kitt Peak | Spacewatch | · | 1.2 km | MPC · JPL |
| 641544 | 2004 CO_{6} | — | January 19, 2004 | Socorro | LINEAR | PHO | 910 m | MPC · JPL |
| 641545 | 2004 CL_{10} | — | January 30, 2004 | Kitt Peak | Spacewatch | · | 890 m | MPC · JPL |
| 641546 | 2004 CH_{75} | — | February 11, 2004 | Palomar | NEAT | HYG | 3.5 km | MPC · JPL |
| 641547 | 2004 CN_{106} | — | February 14, 2004 | Palomar | NEAT | H | 640 m | MPC · JPL |
| 641548 | 2004 CJ_{117} | — | February 11, 2004 | Kitt Peak | Spacewatch | · | 1.1 km | MPC · JPL |
| 641549 | 2004 CD_{119} | — | February 11, 2004 | Kitt Peak | Spacewatch | MAR | 730 m | MPC · JPL |
| 641550 | 2004 CT_{119} | — | February 12, 2004 | Kitt Peak | Spacewatch | · | 590 m | MPC · JPL |
| 641551 | 2004 CC_{131} | — | February 14, 2004 | Palomar | NEAT | · | 1.8 km | MPC · JPL |
| 641552 | 2004 CF_{131} | — | September 16, 2006 | Kitt Peak | Spacewatch | · | 990 m | MPC · JPL |
| 641553 | 2004 CF_{132} | — | December 9, 2015 | Mount Lemmon | Mount Lemmon Survey | · | 1.3 km | MPC · JPL |
| 641554 | 2004 CH_{132} | — | January 19, 2012 | Kitt Peak | Spacewatch | · | 700 m | MPC · JPL |
| 641555 | 2004 CW_{132} | — | December 19, 2007 | Mount Lemmon | Mount Lemmon Survey | · | 1.2 km | MPC · JPL |
| 641556 | 2004 CL_{134} | — | September 16, 2017 | Haleakala | Pan-STARRS 1 | · | 1.8 km | MPC · JPL |
| 641557 | 2004 CO_{134} | — | February 11, 2004 | Palomar | NEAT | · | 680 m | MPC · JPL |
| 641558 | 2004 CS_{134} | — | January 1, 2009 | Kitt Peak | Spacewatch | EOS | 1.6 km | MPC · JPL |
| 641559 | 2004 CK_{135} | — | July 8, 2014 | Haleakala | Pan-STARRS 1 | · | 1.1 km | MPC · JPL |
| 641560 | 2004 CN_{135} | — | September 21, 2017 | Haleakala | Pan-STARRS 1 | EOS | 1.5 km | MPC · JPL |
| 641561 | 2004 DE_{55} | — | February 22, 2004 | Kitt Peak | Spacewatch | KOR | 1.3 km | MPC · JPL |
| 641562 | 2004 DZ_{55} | — | February 22, 2004 | Kitt Peak | Spacewatch | · | 1 km | MPC · JPL |
| 641563 | 2004 DB_{57} | — | February 22, 2004 | Kitt Peak | Spacewatch | · | 580 m | MPC · JPL |
| 641564 | 2004 DM_{57} | — | January 26, 2004 | Anderson Mesa | LONEOS | · | 890 m | MPC · JPL |
| 641565 | 2004 DC_{75} | — | February 17, 2004 | Kitt Peak | Spacewatch | · | 1.7 km | MPC · JPL |
| 641566 | 2004 DE_{78} | — | February 12, 2004 | Kitt Peak | Spacewatch | · | 1.5 km | MPC · JPL |
| 641567 | 2004 DQ_{83} | — | February 17, 2004 | Kitt Peak | Spacewatch | · | 760 m | MPC · JPL |
| 641568 | 2004 DE_{84} | — | February 29, 2004 | Kitt Peak | Spacewatch | · | 650 m | MPC · JPL |
| 641569 | 2004 DX_{84} | — | December 14, 2015 | Mount Lemmon | Mount Lemmon Survey | · | 1.3 km | MPC · JPL |
| 641570 | 2004 DK_{85} | — | September 19, 2007 | Kitt Peak | Spacewatch | · | 1.7 km | MPC · JPL |
| 641571 | 2004 DT_{85} | — | February 17, 2004 | Nogales | P. R. Holvorcem, M. Schwartz | MAR | 850 m | MPC · JPL |
| 641572 | 2004 DU_{85} | — | April 25, 2015 | Haleakala | Pan-STARRS 1 | · | 1.5 km | MPC · JPL |
| 641573 | 2004 DS_{86} | — | March 18, 2018 | Haleakala | Pan-STARRS 1 | · | 570 m | MPC · JPL |
| 641574 | 2004 DV_{86} | — | March 20, 2017 | Haleakala | Pan-STARRS 1 | · | 1.2 km | MPC · JPL |
| 641575 | 2004 DX_{86} | — | January 28, 2015 | Haleakala | Pan-STARRS 1 | · | 2.5 km | MPC · JPL |
| 641576 | 2004 DH_{87} | — | September 30, 2005 | Kitt Peak | Spacewatch | · | 750 m | MPC · JPL |
| 641577 | 2004 DM_{89} | — | February 26, 2004 | Kitt Peak | Deep Ecliptic Survey | · | 820 m | MPC · JPL |
| 641578 | 2004 DV_{89} | — | February 16, 2004 | Kitt Peak | Spacewatch | · | 930 m | MPC · JPL |
| 641579 | 2004 ER_{9} | — | March 15, 2004 | Kitt Peak | Spacewatch | H | 490 m | MPC · JPL |
| 641580 | 2004 EG_{26} | — | March 14, 2004 | Kitt Peak | Spacewatch | (5) | 1.3 km | MPC · JPL |
| 641581 | 2004 EX_{42} | — | March 15, 2004 | Catalina | CSS | JUN | 940 m | MPC · JPL |
| 641582 | 2004 EK_{47} | — | March 15, 2004 | Kitt Peak | Spacewatch | · | 550 m | MPC · JPL |
| 641583 | 2004 EX_{87} | — | March 14, 2004 | Kitt Peak | Spacewatch | · | 580 m | MPC · JPL |
| 641584 | 2004 EZ_{96} | — | March 12, 2004 | Palomar | NEAT | · | 1.4 km | MPC · JPL |
| 641585 | 2004 EJ_{100} | — | March 15, 2004 | Kitt Peak | Spacewatch | EOS | 1.3 km | MPC · JPL |
| 641586 | 2004 EF_{105} | — | March 15, 2004 | Kitt Peak | Spacewatch | · | 490 m | MPC · JPL |
| 641587 | 2004 EN_{105} | — | March 15, 2004 | Kitt Peak | Spacewatch | · | 1.3 km | MPC · JPL |
| 641588 | 2004 EX_{107} | — | March 15, 2004 | Kitt Peak | Spacewatch | · | 1.1 km | MPC · JPL |
| 641589 | 2004 EP_{109} | — | March 15, 2004 | Kitt Peak | Spacewatch | · | 1 km | MPC · JPL |
| 641590 | 2004 EM_{117} | — | September 29, 2014 | Haleakala | Pan-STARRS 1 | · | 1.1 km | MPC · JPL |
| 641591 | 2004 EN_{117} | — | March 20, 2017 | Haleakala | Pan-STARRS 1 | EUN | 1.1 km | MPC · JPL |
| 641592 | 2004 FH_{3} | — | March 18, 2004 | Mount Graham | Ryan, W., Martinez, C. | · | 2.1 km | MPC · JPL |
| 641593 | 2004 FJ_{3} | — | March 19, 2004 | Mount Graham | Ryan, W., Martinez, C. | · | 1.8 km | MPC · JPL |
| 641594 | 2004 FR_{6} | — | March 16, 2004 | Kitt Peak | Spacewatch | EOS | 1.6 km | MPC · JPL |
| 641595 | 2004 FM_{9} | — | March 16, 2004 | Kitt Peak | Spacewatch | · | 1.1 km | MPC · JPL |
| 641596 | 2004 FX_{15} | — | March 10, 2004 | Palomar | NEAT | H | 510 m | MPC · JPL |
| 641597 | 2004 FK_{31} | — | March 30, 2004 | Nogales | P. R. Holvorcem, M. Schwartz | · | 660 m | MPC · JPL |
| 641598 | 2004 FK_{54} | — | March 18, 2004 | Kitt Peak | Spacewatch | · | 1.9 km | MPC · JPL |
| 641599 | 2004 FZ_{71} | — | March 17, 2004 | Kitt Peak | Spacewatch | EOS | 1.3 km | MPC · JPL |
| 641600 | 2004 FR_{73} | — | March 17, 2004 | Kitt Peak | Spacewatch | · | 1.4 km | MPC · JPL |

== 641601–641700 ==
back to top

| Designation | | | Discovery | | | Properties | | Ref |
| Permanent | Provisional | Named after | Date | Site | Discoverer(s) | Category | Diam. | Ref |
|---|---|---|---|---|---|---|---|---|
| 641601 | 2004 FO_{78} | — | March 19, 2004 | Kitt Peak | Spacewatch | · | 600 m | MPC · JPL |
| 641602 | 2004 FF_{98} | — | March 23, 2004 | Socorro | LINEAR | · | 1.1 km | MPC · JPL |
| 641603 | 2004 FZ_{106} | — | March 20, 2004 | Socorro | LINEAR | · | 900 m | MPC · JPL |
| 641604 | 2004 FK_{113} | — | March 21, 2004 | Kitt Peak | Spacewatch | · | 1.3 km | MPC · JPL |
| 641605 | 2004 FA_{120} | — | March 23, 2004 | Kitt Peak | Spacewatch | EMA | 3.0 km | MPC · JPL |
| 641606 | 2004 FM_{152} | — | March 17, 2004 | Kitt Peak | Spacewatch | · | 790 m | MPC · JPL |
| 641607 | 2004 FL_{157} | — | March 17, 2004 | Kitt Peak | Spacewatch | · | 2.1 km | MPC · JPL |
| 641608 | 2004 FO_{162} | — | March 18, 2004 | Kitt Peak | Spacewatch | · | 1.2 km | MPC · JPL |
| 641609 | 2004 FZ_{166} | — | March 19, 2004 | Palomar | NEAT | · | 910 m | MPC · JPL |
| 641610 | 2004 FF_{167} | — | November 8, 2007 | Kitt Peak | Spacewatch | · | 1.7 km | MPC · JPL |
| 641611 | 2004 FG_{167} | — | August 4, 2008 | La Sagra | OAM | · | 670 m | MPC · JPL |
| 641612 | 2004 FA_{168} | — | March 6, 2014 | Calar Alto-CASADO | Proffe, G., Hellmich, S. | · | 650 m | MPC · JPL |
| 641613 | 2004 FE_{168} | — | November 7, 2010 | Mount Lemmon | Mount Lemmon Survey | · | 1.3 km | MPC · JPL |
| 641614 | 2004 FF_{168} | — | February 7, 2008 | Mount Lemmon | Mount Lemmon Survey | · | 1.3 km | MPC · JPL |
| 641615 | 2004 FB_{169} | — | June 23, 2009 | Siding Spring | SSS | · | 1.7 km | MPC · JPL |
| 641616 | 2004 FE_{169} | — | September 21, 2012 | Mount Lemmon | Mount Lemmon Survey | · | 1.7 km | MPC · JPL |
| 641617 | 2004 FW_{169} | — | April 4, 2011 | Kitt Peak | Spacewatch | · | 610 m | MPC · JPL |
| 641618 | 2004 FF_{170} | — | March 23, 2004 | Kitt Peak | Spacewatch | · | 1.2 km | MPC · JPL |
| 641619 | 2004 FH_{170} | — | January 28, 2014 | Mount Lemmon | Mount Lemmon Survey | EOS | 1.4 km | MPC · JPL |
| 641620 | 2004 FJ_{170} | — | September 28, 2006 | Mount Lemmon | Mount Lemmon Survey | LIX | 3.7 km | MPC · JPL |
| 641621 | 2004 FN_{170} | — | March 9, 2011 | Mount Lemmon | Mount Lemmon Survey | (2076) | 760 m | MPC · JPL |
| 641622 | 2004 FQ_{170} | — | March 16, 2004 | Kitt Peak | Spacewatch | · | 1.3 km | MPC · JPL |
| 641623 | 2004 FK_{171} | — | October 22, 2012 | Haleakala | Pan-STARRS 1 | EOS | 1.3 km | MPC · JPL |
| 641624 | 2004 FO_{172} | — | January 8, 2007 | Mount Lemmon | Mount Lemmon Survey | · | 620 m | MPC · JPL |
| 641625 | 2004 FN_{173} | — | September 26, 2012 | Mount Lemmon | Mount Lemmon Survey | · | 2.5 km | MPC · JPL |
| 641626 | 2004 FB_{174} | — | November 16, 2017 | Mount Lemmon | Mount Lemmon Survey | · | 1.7 km | MPC · JPL |
| 641627 | 2004 FU_{174} | — | July 2, 2008 | Kitt Peak | Spacewatch | · | 670 m | MPC · JPL |
| 641628 | 2004 FP_{175} | — | September 19, 2006 | Kitt Peak | Spacewatch | · | 2.2 km | MPC · JPL |
| 641629 | 2004 FX_{175} | — | January 25, 2014 | Haleakala | Pan-STARRS 1 | · | 1.5 km | MPC · JPL |
| 641630 | 2004 FY_{176} | — | January 14, 2016 | Haleakala | Pan-STARRS 1 | · | 960 m | MPC · JPL |
| 641631 | 2004 FH_{177} | — | March 27, 2011 | Mount Lemmon | Mount Lemmon Survey | · | 640 m | MPC · JPL |
| 641632 | 2004 FK_{177} | — | April 20, 2017 | Haleakala | Pan-STARRS 1 | · | 950 m | MPC · JPL |
| 641633 | 2004 FL_{177} | — | September 17, 2012 | Mount Lemmon | Mount Lemmon Survey | · | 610 m | MPC · JPL |
| 641634 | 2004 FE_{178} | — | March 31, 2004 | Kitt Peak | Spacewatch | · | 680 m | MPC · JPL |
| 641635 | 2004 GS_{11} | — | April 12, 2004 | Socorro | LINEAR | · | 2.0 km | MPC · JPL |
| 641636 | 2004 GE_{19} | — | April 13, 2004 | Kitt Peak | Spacewatch | H | 410 m | MPC · JPL |
| 641637 | 2004 GM_{49} | — | April 12, 2004 | Kitt Peak | Spacewatch | · | 1.3 km | MPC · JPL |
| 641638 | 2004 GU_{50} | — | April 13, 2004 | Kitt Peak | Spacewatch | EUN | 1.0 km | MPC · JPL |
| 641639 | 2004 GL_{55} | — | April 13, 2004 | Kitt Peak | Spacewatch | EOS | 1.5 km | MPC · JPL |
| 641640 | 2004 GQ_{63} | — | April 13, 2004 | Kitt Peak | Spacewatch | · | 2.2 km | MPC · JPL |
| 641641 | 2004 GZ_{64} | — | April 13, 2004 | Kitt Peak | Spacewatch | · | 2.4 km | MPC · JPL |
| 641642 | 2004 GC_{65} | — | April 13, 2004 | Kitt Peak | Spacewatch | · | 880 m | MPC · JPL |
| 641643 | 2004 GZ_{68} | — | April 13, 2004 | Kitt Peak | Spacewatch | MAR | 1.1 km | MPC · JPL |
| 641644 | 2004 GU_{79} | — | April 26, 2000 | Kitt Peak | Spacewatch | · | 1.3 km | MPC · JPL |
| 641645 | 2004 GK_{80} | — | April 12, 2004 | Kitt Peak | Spacewatch | · | 690 m | MPC · JPL |
| 641646 | 2004 GN_{84} | — | April 14, 2004 | Kitt Peak | Spacewatch | · | 530 m | MPC · JPL |
| 641647 | 2004 GV_{86} | — | April 14, 2004 | Kitt Peak | Spacewatch | PHO | 670 m | MPC · JPL |
| 641648 | 2004 GP_{89} | — | October 25, 2014 | Mount Lemmon | Mount Lemmon Survey | · | 1.4 km | MPC · JPL |
| 641649 | 2004 GJ_{90} | — | October 17, 2012 | Haleakala | Pan-STARRS 1 | · | 1.2 km | MPC · JPL |
| 641650 | 2004 GX_{90} | — | October 27, 2005 | Kitt Peak | Spacewatch | · | 630 m | MPC · JPL |
| 641651 | 2004 GZ_{90} | — | May 21, 2015 | Cerro Tololo | DECam | · | 2.3 km | MPC · JPL |
| 641652 | 2004 GB_{91} | — | September 15, 2006 | Kitt Peak | Spacewatch | · | 1.7 km | MPC · JPL |
| 641653 | 2004 GD_{91} | — | September 15, 2012 | Catalina | CSS | · | 660 m | MPC · JPL |
| 641654 | 2004 GK_{91} | — | May 20, 2015 | Cerro Tololo | DECam | EOS | 1.4 km | MPC · JPL |
| 641655 | 2004 GM_{91} | — | April 11, 2004 | Palomar | NEAT | · | 1.3 km | MPC · JPL |
| 641656 | 2004 GN_{91} | — | March 3, 2009 | Kitt Peak | Spacewatch | · | 2.1 km | MPC · JPL |
| 641657 | 2004 GY_{91} | — | January 14, 2016 | Haleakala | Pan-STARRS 1 | · | 1.1 km | MPC · JPL |
| 641658 | 2004 HK_{11} | — | April 19, 2004 | Socorro | LINEAR | · | 860 m | MPC · JPL |
| 641659 | 2004 HT_{13} | — | April 16, 2004 | Kitt Peak | Spacewatch | · | 560 m | MPC · JPL |
| 641660 | 2004 HO_{16} | — | April 19, 2004 | Kitt Peak | Spacewatch | JUN | 780 m | MPC · JPL |
| 641661 | 2004 HW_{28} | — | April 12, 2004 | Palomar | NEAT | · | 1.4 km | MPC · JPL |
| 641662 | 2004 HL_{33} | — | April 16, 2004 | Socorro | LINEAR | (1547) | 1.5 km | MPC · JPL |
| 641663 | 2004 HC_{72} | — | April 25, 2004 | Kitt Peak | Spacewatch | · | 640 m | MPC · JPL |
| 641664 | 2004 HW_{79} | — | August 31, 2005 | Palomar | NEAT | · | 1.8 km | MPC · JPL |
| 641665 | 2004 HA_{80} | — | September 1, 2005 | Kitt Peak | Spacewatch | · | 1.4 km | MPC · JPL |
| 641666 | 2004 HW_{80} | — | April 19, 2004 | Kitt Peak | Spacewatch | · | 680 m | MPC · JPL |
| 641667 | 2004 HX_{80} | — | January 30, 2011 | Kitt Peak | Spacewatch | · | 880 m | MPC · JPL |
| 641668 | 2004 HD_{81} | — | November 14, 2006 | Kitt Peak | Spacewatch | · | 1.1 km | MPC · JPL |
| 641669 | 2004 HY_{81} | — | March 8, 2008 | Mount Lemmon | Mount Lemmon Survey | MIS | 2.2 km | MPC · JPL |
| 641670 | 2004 HP_{82} | — | December 24, 2013 | Mount Lemmon | Mount Lemmon Survey | · | 2.0 km | MPC · JPL |
| 641671 | 2004 HO_{83} | — | March 23, 2017 | Haleakala | Pan-STARRS 1 | · | 1.5 km | MPC · JPL |
| 641672 | 2004 HU_{83} | — | August 30, 2005 | Kitt Peak | Spacewatch | · | 740 m | MPC · JPL |
| 641673 | 2004 HT_{84} | — | November 20, 2006 | Mount Lemmon | Mount Lemmon Survey | EUN | 1.0 km | MPC · JPL |
| 641674 | 2004 HB_{85} | — | April 28, 2004 | Kitt Peak | Spacewatch | · | 1.2 km | MPC · JPL |
| 641675 | 2004 HP_{85} | — | April 22, 2004 | Apache Point | SDSS Collaboration | · | 2.5 km | MPC · JPL |
| 641676 | 2004 JW_{7} | — | May 10, 2004 | Kitt Peak | Spacewatch | · | 690 m | MPC · JPL |
| 641677 | 2004 JV_{37} | — | May 14, 2004 | Socorro | LINEAR | JUN | 1.2 km | MPC · JPL |
| 641678 | 2004 JV_{38} | — | May 14, 2004 | Kitt Peak | Spacewatch | · | 1.7 km | MPC · JPL |
| 641679 | 2004 JN_{48} | — | April 21, 2004 | Kitt Peak | Spacewatch | · | 760 m | MPC · JPL |
| 641680 | 2004 JJ_{51} | — | May 14, 2004 | Kitt Peak | Spacewatch | · | 740 m | MPC · JPL |
| 641681 | 2004 JO_{57} | — | October 2, 2014 | Kitt Peak | Spacewatch | ADE | 2.0 km | MPC · JPL |
| 641682 | 2004 JT_{57} | — | March 29, 2009 | Mount Lemmon | Mount Lemmon Survey | · | 2.3 km | MPC · JPL |
| 641683 | 2004 JD_{58} | — | September 30, 2005 | Mount Lemmon | Mount Lemmon Survey | · | 630 m | MPC · JPL |
| 641684 | 2004 JF_{58} | — | November 6, 2010 | Mount Lemmon | Mount Lemmon Survey | · | 1.4 km | MPC · JPL |
| 641685 | 2004 JK_{58} | — | May 14, 2004 | Kitt Peak | Spacewatch | · | 680 m | MPC · JPL |
| 641686 | 2004 KL_{7} | — | May 20, 2004 | Kitt Peak | Spacewatch | · | 1.4 km | MPC · JPL |
| 641687 | 2004 KC_{11} | — | May 19, 2004 | Kitt Peak | Spacewatch | · | 1.4 km | MPC · JPL |
| 641688 | 2004 KS_{17} | — | May 19, 2004 | Kitt Peak | Spacewatch | H | 500 m | MPC · JPL |
| 641689 | 2004 KE_{20} | — | November 27, 2014 | Haleakala | Pan-STARRS 1 | EUN | 1.1 km | MPC · JPL |
| 641690 | 2004 KQ_{20} | — | March 29, 2014 | Mount Lemmon | Mount Lemmon Survey | · | 690 m | MPC · JPL |
| 641691 | 2004 KS_{20} | — | February 24, 2012 | Mount Lemmon | Mount Lemmon Survey | · | 1.3 km | MPC · JPL |
| 641692 | 2004 KF_{21} | — | May 19, 2004 | Kitt Peak | Spacewatch | · | 1.4 km | MPC · JPL |
| 641693 | 2004 KM_{21} | — | August 1, 2017 | Haleakala | Pan-STARRS 1 | · | 2.7 km | MPC · JPL |
| 641694 | 2004 KW_{21} | — | November 10, 2009 | Mount Lemmon | Mount Lemmon Survey | L4 | 8.1 km | MPC · JPL |
| 641695 | 2004 KJ_{22} | — | May 23, 2004 | Kitt Peak | Spacewatch | · | 2.0 km | MPC · JPL |
| 641696 | 2004 KK_{22} | — | November 30, 2010 | Mount Lemmon | Mount Lemmon Survey | L4 | 7.8 km | MPC · JPL |
| 641697 | 2004 LF_{2} | — | June 11, 2004 | Socorro | LINEAR | · | 1.9 km | MPC · JPL |
| 641698 | 2004 LU_{12} | — | June 9, 2004 | Kitt Peak | Spacewatch | · | 640 m | MPC · JPL |
| 641699 | 2004 LP_{23} | — | June 15, 2004 | Needville | J. Dellinger, Eastman, M. | · | 1.7 km | MPC · JPL |
| 641700 | 2004 LD_{32} | — | April 25, 2015 | Haleakala | Pan-STARRS 1 | · | 2.0 km | MPC · JPL |

== 641701–641800 ==
back to top

| Designation | | | Discovery | | | Properties | | Ref |
| Permanent | Provisional | Named after | Date | Site | Discoverer(s) | Category | Diam. | Ref |
|---|---|---|---|---|---|---|---|---|
| 641701 | 2004 LL_{32} | — | April 16, 2004 | Palomar | NEAT | ERI | 1.4 km | MPC · JPL |
| 641702 | 2004 LR_{32} | — | September 3, 2008 | Kitt Peak | Spacewatch | L4 | 7.2 km | MPC · JPL |
| 641703 | 2004 LG_{33} | — | May 22, 2001 | Cerro Tololo | Deep Ecliptic Survey | · | 520 m | MPC · JPL |
| 641704 | 2004 MJ_{3} | — | June 19, 2004 | Catalina | CSS | T_{j} (2.98) | 4.1 km | MPC · JPL |
| 641705 | 2004 MV_{9} | — | October 13, 2010 | Mount Lemmon | Mount Lemmon Survey | · | 1.7 km | MPC · JPL |
| 641706 | 2004 MQ_{10} | — | March 12, 2014 | Mount Lemmon | Mount Lemmon Survey | · | 1.8 km | MPC · JPL |
| 641707 | 2004 NH_{7} | — | May 12, 2004 | Siding Spring | SSS | · | 2.4 km | MPC · JPL |
| 641708 | 2004 NO_{22} | — | July 11, 2004 | Socorro | LINEAR | · | 2.1 km | MPC · JPL |
| 641709 | 2004 NF_{32} | — | July 15, 2004 | Cerro Tololo | Deep Ecliptic Survey | THM | 2.0 km | MPC · JPL |
| 641710 | 2004 NA_{34} | — | July 12, 2004 | Palomar | NEAT | · | 1.2 km | MPC · JPL |
| 641711 | 2004 NB_{34} | — | July 21, 2012 | Siding Spring | SSS | H | 580 m | MPC · JPL |
| 641712 | 2004 NG_{34} | — | September 15, 2009 | Kitt Peak | Spacewatch | · | 1.5 km | MPC · JPL |
| 641713 | 2004 NJ_{34} | — | July 13, 2004 | Siding Spring | SSS | · | 1.9 km | MPC · JPL |
| 641714 | 2004 NO_{34} | — | July 15, 2004 | Siding Spring | SSS | · | 1.3 km | MPC · JPL |
| 641715 | 2004 OL_{13} | — | July 22, 2004 | Mauna Kea | Veillet, C. | EUN | 1.0 km | MPC · JPL |
| 641716 | 2004 OE_{16} | — | October 18, 2012 | Haleakala | Pan-STARRS 1 | · | 2.0 km | MPC · JPL |
| 641717 | 2004 OU_{16} | — | March 28, 2014 | Mount Lemmon | Mount Lemmon Survey | · | 470 m | MPC · JPL |
| 641718 | 2004 OK_{17} | — | July 20, 2004 | Siding Spring | SSS | · | 2.0 km | MPC · JPL |
| 641719 | 2004 PK_{1} | — | August 7, 2004 | Palomar | NEAT | H | 670 m | MPC · JPL |
| 641720 | 2004 PE_{7} | — | August 6, 2004 | Palomar | NEAT | · | 1.6 km | MPC · JPL |
| 641721 | 2004 PG_{29} | — | August 6, 2004 | Campo Imperatore | CINEOS | MAS | 590 m | MPC · JPL |
| 641722 | 2004 PB_{43} | — | August 5, 2004 | Palomar | NEAT | · | 2.1 km | MPC · JPL |
| 641723 | 2004 PS_{55} | — | August 8, 2004 | Anderson Mesa | LONEOS | · | 780 m | MPC · JPL |
| 641724 | 2004 PT_{68} | — | July 11, 2004 | Palomar | NEAT | · | 1.5 km | MPC · JPL |
| 641725 | 2004 PW_{95} | — | August 8, 2004 | Socorro | LINEAR | · | 820 m | MPC · JPL |
| 641726 | 2004 PG_{114} | — | August 8, 2004 | Socorro | LINEAR | · | 1.4 km | MPC · JPL |
| 641727 | 2004 PZ_{115} | — | August 12, 2004 | Mauna Kea | P. A. Wiegert | · | 2.3 km | MPC · JPL |
| 641728 | 2004 PC_{116} | — | July 17, 2004 | Cerro Tololo | Deep Ecliptic Survey | V | 530 m | MPC · JPL |
| 641729 | 2004 PC_{118} | — | August 8, 2004 | Siding Spring | SSS | · | 1.6 km | MPC · JPL |
| 641730 | 2004 PD_{118} | — | August 8, 2004 | Palomar | NEAT | · | 3.4 km | MPC · JPL |
| 641731 | 2004 PS_{118} | — | September 3, 2010 | Mount Lemmon | Mount Lemmon Survey | EUP | 2.5 km | MPC · JPL |
| 641732 | 2004 PF_{119} | — | August 10, 2004 | Campo Imperatore | CINEOS | · | 1.1 km | MPC · JPL |
| 641733 | 2004 PZ_{119} | — | August 23, 2004 | Kitt Peak | Spacewatch | · | 1.4 km | MPC · JPL |
| 641734 | 2004 PB_{120} | — | March 13, 2008 | Kitt Peak | Spacewatch | · | 2.0 km | MPC · JPL |
| 641735 | 2004 PO_{120} | — | August 20, 2004 | Kitt Peak | Spacewatch | AGN | 900 m | MPC · JPL |
| 641736 | 2004 PS_{120} | — | January 8, 2013 | Mount Lemmon | Mount Lemmon Survey | · | 3.8 km | MPC · JPL |
| 641737 | 2004 PP_{121} | — | April 6, 2014 | Mount Lemmon | Mount Lemmon Survey | · | 800 m | MPC · JPL |
| 641738 | 2004 QW_{13} | — | August 22, 2004 | Črni Vrh | Mikuž, H. | · | 1.3 km | MPC · JPL |
| 641739 | 2004 QJ_{15} | — | August 23, 2004 | Kitt Peak | Spacewatch | · | 2.4 km | MPC · JPL |
| 641740 | 2004 QU_{29} | — | August 30, 2013 | Haleakala | Pan-STARRS 1 | · | 1.5 km | MPC · JPL |
| 641741 | 2004 QF_{30} | — | January 14, 2011 | Kitt Peak | Spacewatch | · | 1.7 km | MPC · JPL |
| 641742 | 2004 QJ_{32} | — | August 25, 2004 | Kitt Peak | Spacewatch | · | 1.6 km | MPC · JPL |
| 641743 | 2004 QL_{33} | — | August 9, 2015 | Haleakala | Pan-STARRS 1 | V | 560 m | MPC · JPL |
| 641744 | 2004 QO_{33} | — | August 22, 2004 | Kitt Peak | Spacewatch | · | 600 m | MPC · JPL |
| 641745 | 2004 QH_{34} | — | September 21, 2009 | Mount Lemmon | Mount Lemmon Survey | MRX | 840 m | MPC · JPL |
| 641746 | 2004 QS_{34} | — | April 5, 2016 | Haleakala | Pan-STARRS 1 | · | 1.6 km | MPC · JPL |
| 641747 | 2004 QV_{34} | — | January 19, 2012 | Haleakala | Pan-STARRS 1 | · | 1.9 km | MPC · JPL |
| 641748 | 2004 QM_{36} | — | April 27, 2017 | Haleakala | Pan-STARRS 1 | · | 1.5 km | MPC · JPL |
| 641749 | 2004 QD_{38} | — | August 25, 2004 | Kitt Peak | Spacewatch | · | 2.3 km | MPC · JPL |
| 641750 | 2004 QC_{39} | — | August 22, 2004 | Kitt Peak | Spacewatch | · | 850 m | MPC · JPL |
| 641751 | 2004 RS_{23} | — | September 8, 2004 | Uccle | T. Pauwels | GEF | 1.1 km | MPC · JPL |
| 641752 | 2004 RS_{37} | — | September 7, 2004 | Socorro | LINEAR | · | 1.5 km | MPC · JPL |
| 641753 | 2004 RS_{41} | — | September 7, 2004 | Kitt Peak | Spacewatch | AEO | 950 m | MPC · JPL |
| 641754 | 2004 RV_{44} | — | August 14, 2004 | Cerro Tololo | Deep Ecliptic Survey | · | 1.1 km | MPC · JPL |
| 641755 | 2004 RX_{44} | — | August 7, 2004 | Palomar | NEAT | · | 1.1 km | MPC · JPL |
| 641756 | 2004 RV_{87} | — | September 7, 2004 | Palomar | NEAT | · | 710 m | MPC · JPL |
| 641757 | 2004 RB_{107} | — | August 25, 2004 | Kitt Peak | Spacewatch | MRX | 950 m | MPC · JPL |
| 641758 | 2004 RP_{113} | — | September 7, 2004 | Palomar | NEAT | · | 2.6 km | MPC · JPL |
| 641759 | 2004 RD_{115} | — | September 7, 2004 | Kitt Peak | Spacewatch | NYS | 1.0 km | MPC · JPL |
| 641760 | 2004 RD_{116} | — | September 7, 2004 | Kitt Peak | Spacewatch | · | 1.6 km | MPC · JPL |
| 641761 | 2004 RQ_{117} | — | September 7, 2004 | Kitt Peak | Spacewatch | · | 1.5 km | MPC · JPL |
| 641762 | 2004 RU_{117} | — | September 7, 2004 | Kitt Peak | Spacewatch | · | 1.5 km | MPC · JPL |
| 641763 | 2004 RX_{117} | — | September 7, 2004 | Kitt Peak | Spacewatch | · | 1.5 km | MPC · JPL |
| 641764 | 2004 RK_{121} | — | August 15, 2004 | Cerro Tololo | Deep Ecliptic Survey | NYS | 930 m | MPC · JPL |
| 641765 | 2004 RB_{122} | — | September 7, 2004 | Kitt Peak | Spacewatch | · | 590 m | MPC · JPL |
| 641766 | 2004 RF_{125} | — | September 7, 2004 | Kitt Peak | Spacewatch | PAD | 1.4 km | MPC · JPL |
| 641767 | 2004 RN_{130} | — | September 7, 2004 | Kitt Peak | Spacewatch | · | 2.4 km | MPC · JPL |
| 641768 | 2004 RT_{130} | — | March 11, 2003 | Kitt Peak | Spacewatch | · | 990 m | MPC · JPL |
| 641769 | 2004 RH_{132} | — | September 7, 2004 | Kitt Peak | Spacewatch | · | 2.3 km | MPC · JPL |
| 641770 | 2004 RW_{141} | — | September 8, 2004 | Socorro | LINEAR | T_{j} (2.74) · unusual | 7.0 km | MPC · JPL |
| 641771 | 2004 RN_{147} | — | September 9, 2004 | Socorro | LINEAR | · | 820 m | MPC · JPL |
| 641772 | 2004 RJ_{160} | — | September 10, 2004 | Socorro | LINEAR | · | 750 m | MPC · JPL |
| 641773 | 2004 RR_{160} | — | September 10, 2004 | Kitt Peak | Spacewatch | AEO | 840 m | MPC · JPL |
| 641774 | 2004 RJ_{163} | — | September 11, 2004 | Kitt Peak | Spacewatch | · | 3.4 km | MPC · JPL |
| 641775 | 2004 RV_{169} | — | September 8, 2004 | Socorro | LINEAR | · | 810 m | MPC · JPL |
| 641776 | 2004 RF_{177} | — | September 10, 2004 | Socorro | LINEAR | · | 1.2 km | MPC · JPL |
| 641777 | 2004 RW_{201} | — | September 11, 2004 | Socorro | LINEAR | · | 860 m | MPC · JPL |
| 641778 | 2004 RL_{202} | — | September 11, 2004 | Socorro | LINEAR | · | 2.6 km | MPC · JPL |
| 641779 | 2004 RH_{205} | — | September 8, 2004 | Palomar | NEAT | · | 1.5 km | MPC · JPL |
| 641780 | 2004 RF_{207} | — | July 12, 2004 | Palomar | NEAT | JUN | 1.1 km | MPC · JPL |
| 641781 | 2004 RM_{219} | — | September 11, 2004 | Socorro | LINEAR | EUN | 1.1 km | MPC · JPL |
| 641782 | 2004 RS_{221} | — | September 12, 2004 | Socorro | LINEAR | · | 3.4 km | MPC · JPL |
| 641783 | 2004 RX_{228} | — | September 9, 2004 | Kitt Peak | Spacewatch | · | 870 m | MPC · JPL |
| 641784 | 2004 RA_{233} | — | September 9, 2004 | Kitt Peak | Spacewatch | · | 1.4 km | MPC · JPL |
| 641785 | 2004 RU_{237} | — | September 10, 2004 | Kitt Peak | Spacewatch | · | 710 m | MPC · JPL |
| 641786 | 2004 RY_{237} | — | September 10, 2004 | Kitt Peak | Spacewatch | · | 1.6 km | MPC · JPL |
| 641787 | 2004 RW_{239} | — | January 15, 1996 | Kitt Peak | Spacewatch | · | 3.0 km | MPC · JPL |
| 641788 | 2004 RC_{240} | — | September 10, 2004 | Kitt Peak | Spacewatch | · | 1.5 km | MPC · JPL |
| 641789 | 2004 RP_{245} | — | September 10, 2004 | Kitt Peak | Spacewatch | · | 1.4 km | MPC · JPL |
| 641790 | 2004 RC_{246} | — | September 10, 2004 | Kitt Peak | Spacewatch | · | 1.2 km | MPC · JPL |
| 641791 | 2004 RC_{261} | — | September 10, 2004 | Kitt Peak | Spacewatch | · | 1.1 km | MPC · JPL |
| 641792 | 2004 RS_{261} | — | September 10, 2004 | Kitt Peak | Spacewatch | AGN | 880 m | MPC · JPL |
| 641793 | 2004 RB_{262} | — | September 10, 2004 | Kitt Peak | Spacewatch | HOF | 1.8 km | MPC · JPL |
| 641794 | 2004 RW_{262} | — | September 10, 2004 | Kitt Peak | Spacewatch | · | 1.1 km | MPC · JPL |
| 641795 | 2004 RV_{267} | — | September 11, 2004 | Kitt Peak | Spacewatch | VER | 2.4 km | MPC · JPL |
| 641796 | 2004 RE_{269} | — | September 11, 2004 | Kitt Peak | Spacewatch | · | 1.4 km | MPC · JPL |
| 641797 | 2004 RS_{270} | — | September 11, 2004 | Kitt Peak | Spacewatch | · | 1.4 km | MPC · JPL |
| 641798 | 2004 RL_{278} | — | September 15, 2004 | Kitt Peak | Spacewatch | · | 820 m | MPC · JPL |
| 641799 | 2004 RF_{280} | — | September 15, 2004 | Kitt Peak | Spacewatch | · | 950 m | MPC · JPL |
| 641800 | 2004 RD_{285} | — | September 15, 2004 | Kitt Peak | Spacewatch | · | 980 m | MPC · JPL |

== 641801–641900 ==
back to top

| Designation | | | Discovery | | | Properties | | Ref |
| Permanent | Provisional | Named after | Date | Site | Discoverer(s) | Category | Diam. | Ref |
|---|---|---|---|---|---|---|---|---|
| 641801 | 2004 RK_{290} | — | September 8, 2004 | Palomar | NEAT | JUN | 1.1 km | MPC · JPL |
| 641802 | 2004 RL_{293} | — | August 25, 2004 | Kitt Peak | Spacewatch | · | 1.0 km | MPC · JPL |
| 641803 | 2004 RS_{301} | — | September 11, 2004 | Kitt Peak | Spacewatch | · | 890 m | MPC · JPL |
| 641804 | 2004 RR_{303} | — | September 12, 2004 | Kitt Peak | Spacewatch | PHO | 650 m | MPC · JPL |
| 641805 | 2004 RL_{310} | — | September 13, 2004 | Kitt Peak | Spacewatch | · | 1.9 km | MPC · JPL |
| 641806 | 2004 RX_{310} | — | September 13, 2004 | Palomar | NEAT | JUN | 1.0 km | MPC · JPL |
| 641807 | 2004 RE_{320} | — | September 13, 2004 | Socorro | LINEAR | · | 1.3 km | MPC · JPL |
| 641808 | 2004 RR_{327} | — | September 14, 2004 | Socorro | LINEAR | GEF | 1.2 km | MPC · JPL |
| 641809 | 2004 RW_{327} | — | September 14, 2004 | Palomar | NEAT | PHO | 1.2 km | MPC · JPL |
| 641810 | 2004 RA_{329} | — | September 15, 2004 | Kitt Peak | Spacewatch | · | 850 m | MPC · JPL |
| 641811 | 2004 RK_{330} | — | September 15, 2004 | Kitt Peak | Spacewatch | · | 810 m | MPC · JPL |
| 641812 | 2004 RU_{340} | — | September 7, 2004 | Socorro | LINEAR | · | 1.6 km | MPC · JPL |
| 641813 | 2004 RV_{341} | — | September 11, 2004 | Kitt Peak | Spacewatch | THM | 2.6 km | MPC · JPL |
| 641814 | 2004 RG_{357} | — | September 11, 2004 | Kitt Peak | Spacewatch | · | 950 m | MPC · JPL |
| 641815 | 2004 RN_{357} | — | September 30, 2010 | Mount Lemmon | Mount Lemmon Survey | · | 2.5 km | MPC · JPL |
| 641816 | 2004 RQ_{357} | — | October 31, 2005 | Mount Lemmon | Mount Lemmon Survey | · | 2.6 km | MPC · JPL |
| 641817 | 2004 RW_{357} | — | December 27, 2011 | Kitt Peak | Spacewatch | · | 3.1 km | MPC · JPL |
| 641818 | 2004 RA_{358} | — | February 8, 2016 | Mount Lemmon | Mount Lemmon Survey | H | 420 m | MPC · JPL |
| 641819 | 2004 RD_{358} | — | March 29, 2012 | Haleakala | Pan-STARRS 1 | GEF | 1.2 km | MPC · JPL |
| 641820 | 2004 RS_{358} | — | June 19, 2014 | Haleakala | Pan-STARRS 1 | · | 950 m | MPC · JPL |
| 641821 | 2004 RL_{359} | — | March 2, 2011 | Mount Lemmon | Mount Lemmon Survey | · | 1.5 km | MPC · JPL |
| 641822 | 2004 RO_{359} | — | October 31, 2008 | Kitt Peak | Spacewatch | · | 920 m | MPC · JPL |
| 641823 | 2004 RJ_{360} | — | September 15, 2004 | Kitt Peak | Spacewatch | · | 1.7 km | MPC · JPL |
| 641824 | 2004 RR_{362} | — | September 26, 2008 | Kitt Peak | Spacewatch | · | 950 m | MPC · JPL |
| 641825 | 2004 RX_{362} | — | October 16, 2009 | Kitt Peak | Spacewatch | MRX | 730 m | MPC · JPL |
| 641826 | 2004 RY_{362} | — | February 1, 2009 | Kitt Peak | Spacewatch | 3:2 | 3.6 km | MPC · JPL |
| 641827 | 2004 RC_{363} | — | September 11, 2004 | Kitt Peak | Spacewatch | · | 1.4 km | MPC · JPL |
| 641828 | 2004 RN_{363} | — | September 8, 2004 | Palomar | NEAT | · | 1.8 km | MPC · JPL |
| 641829 | 2004 RM_{364} | — | October 31, 1997 | Caussols | ODAS | V | 620 m | MPC · JPL |
| 641830 | 2004 RU_{364} | — | April 21, 2012 | Mount Lemmon | Mount Lemmon Survey | · | 1.7 km | MPC · JPL |
| 641831 | 2004 SX_{2} | — | September 17, 2004 | Bergisch Gladbach | W. Bickel | · | 3.4 km | MPC · JPL |
| 641832 | 2004 SV_{12} | — | September 17, 2004 | Anderson Mesa | LONEOS | · | 880 m | MPC · JPL |
| 641833 | 2004 SW_{14} | — | September 17, 2004 | Anderson Mesa | LONEOS | · | 670 m | MPC · JPL |
| 641834 | 2004 SB_{25} | — | September 21, 2004 | Kitt Peak | Spacewatch | · | 2.7 km | MPC · JPL |
| 641835 | 2004 SB_{36} | — | September 9, 2004 | Kitt Peak | Spacewatch | · | 2.6 km | MPC · JPL |
| 641836 | 2004 SG_{47} | — | September 18, 2004 | Socorro | LINEAR | BRA | 1.3 km | MPC · JPL |
| 641837 | 2004 SY_{50} | — | September 10, 2004 | Kitt Peak | Spacewatch | · | 1.9 km | MPC · JPL |
| 641838 | 2004 SE_{62} | — | September 23, 2004 | Kitt Peak | Spacewatch | · | 1.3 km | MPC · JPL |
| 641839 | 2004 SU_{62} | — | April 28, 2012 | Mount Lemmon | Mount Lemmon Survey | · | 1.2 km | MPC · JPL |
| 641840 | 2004 SB_{63} | — | February 16, 2015 | Haleakala | Pan-STARRS 1 | · | 1.0 km | MPC · JPL |
| 641841 | 2004 SJ_{63} | — | September 22, 2004 | Kitt Peak | Spacewatch | · | 1.7 km | MPC · JPL |
| 641842 | 2004 SE_{65} | — | November 26, 2014 | Haleakala | Pan-STARRS 1 | · | 1.4 km | MPC · JPL |
| 641843 | 2004 SR_{66} | — | September 22, 2004 | Kitt Peak | Spacewatch | AGN | 870 m | MPC · JPL |
| 641844 | 2004 TD | — | October 3, 2004 | Palomar | NEAT | H | 560 m | MPC · JPL |
| 641845 | 2004 TE_{5} | — | October 4, 2004 | Kitt Peak | Spacewatch | · | 2.1 km | MPC · JPL |
| 641846 | 2004 TC_{25} | — | October 4, 2004 | Kitt Peak | Spacewatch | · | 1.6 km | MPC · JPL |
| 641847 | 2004 TO_{27} | — | October 4, 2004 | Kitt Peak | Spacewatch | · | 1.3 km | MPC · JPL |
| 641848 | 2004 TM_{30} | — | October 4, 2004 | Kitt Peak | Spacewatch | · | 930 m | MPC · JPL |
| 641849 | 2004 TE_{44} | — | October 4, 2004 | Kitt Peak | Spacewatch | · | 1.1 km | MPC · JPL |
| 641850 | 2004 TJ_{45} | — | October 4, 2004 | Kitt Peak | Spacewatch | MAS | 610 m | MPC · JPL |
| 641851 | 2004 TB_{47} | — | October 4, 2004 | Kitt Peak | Spacewatch | · | 1.4 km | MPC · JPL |
| 641852 | 2004 TU_{56} | — | October 5, 2004 | Kitt Peak | Spacewatch | · | 750 m | MPC · JPL |
| 641853 | 2004 TH_{66} | — | October 5, 2004 | Anderson Mesa | LONEOS | · | 600 m | MPC · JPL |
| 641854 | 2004 TN_{71} | — | September 23, 2004 | Kitt Peak | Spacewatch | · | 1.6 km | MPC · JPL |
| 641855 | 2004 TM_{77} | — | October 7, 2004 | Kitt Peak | Spacewatch | NYS | 810 m | MPC · JPL |
| 641856 | 2004 TY_{78} | — | October 4, 2004 | Kitt Peak | Spacewatch | MAS | 450 m | MPC · JPL |
| 641857 | 2004 TV_{79} | — | October 5, 2004 | Kitt Peak | Spacewatch | EOS | 2.2 km | MPC · JPL |
| 641858 | 2004 TM_{80} | — | October 5, 2004 | Kitt Peak | Spacewatch | EOS | 1.3 km | MPC · JPL |
| 641859 | 2004 TD_{81} | — | October 5, 2004 | Kitt Peak | Spacewatch | · | 2.6 km | MPC · JPL |
| 641860 | 2004 TT_{81} | — | October 5, 2004 | Kitt Peak | Spacewatch | AEO | 900 m | MPC · JPL |
| 641861 | 2004 TD_{96} | — | October 5, 2004 | Kitt Peak | Spacewatch | · | 2.1 km | MPC · JPL |
| 641862 | 2004 TX_{97} | — | October 5, 2004 | Kitt Peak | Spacewatch | · | 1.5 km | MPC · JPL |
| 641863 | 2004 TK_{98} | — | October 5, 2004 | Kitt Peak | Spacewatch | · | 830 m | MPC · JPL |
| 641864 | 2004 TO_{98} | — | October 5, 2004 | Kitt Peak | Spacewatch | · | 1.1 km | MPC · JPL |
| 641865 | 2004 TQ_{99} | — | October 5, 2004 | Kitt Peak | Spacewatch | NEM | 1.8 km | MPC · JPL |
| 641866 | 2004 TK_{100} | — | October 5, 2004 | Palomar | NEAT | · | 1.8 km | MPC · JPL |
| 641867 | 2004 TU_{101} | — | October 6, 2004 | Kitt Peak | Spacewatch | EUN | 1.1 km | MPC · JPL |
| 641868 | 2004 TY_{105} | — | October 7, 2004 | Socorro | LINEAR | · | 1.1 km | MPC · JPL |
| 641869 | 2004 TR_{107} | — | October 7, 2004 | Kitt Peak | Spacewatch | · | 970 m | MPC · JPL |
| 641870 | 2004 TO_{108} | — | September 9, 2004 | Socorro | LINEAR | · | 980 m | MPC · JPL |
| 641871 | 2004 TF_{113} | — | October 7, 2004 | Kitt Peak | Spacewatch | · | 1.3 km | MPC · JPL |
| 641872 | 2004 TU_{121} | — | October 7, 2004 | Anderson Mesa | LONEOS | MAS | 690 m | MPC · JPL |
| 641873 | 2004 TY_{128} | — | October 7, 2004 | Socorro | LINEAR | · | 2.1 km | MPC · JPL |
| 641874 | 2004 TC_{140} | — | September 22, 2004 | Socorro | LINEAR | DOR | 1.9 km | MPC · JPL |
| 641875 | 2004 TN_{145} | — | October 5, 2004 | Kitt Peak | Spacewatch | · | 2.6 km | MPC · JPL |
| 641876 | 2004 TO_{145} | — | October 5, 2004 | Kitt Peak | Spacewatch | AGN | 820 m | MPC · JPL |
| 641877 | 2004 TE_{147} | — | October 6, 2004 | Kitt Peak | Spacewatch | AGN | 960 m | MPC · JPL |
| 641878 | 2004 TU_{147} | — | October 6, 2004 | Kitt Peak | Spacewatch | · | 1.0 km | MPC · JPL |
| 641879 | 2004 TX_{152} | — | October 6, 2004 | Kitt Peak | Spacewatch | · | 1.4 km | MPC · JPL |
| 641880 | 2004 TM_{156} | — | October 6, 2004 | Kitt Peak | Spacewatch | · | 1.6 km | MPC · JPL |
| 641881 | 2004 TB_{158} | — | October 6, 2004 | Kitt Peak | Spacewatch | · | 1.8 km | MPC · JPL |
| 641882 | 2004 TZ_{158} | — | October 6, 2004 | Kitt Peak | Spacewatch | · | 1.5 km | MPC · JPL |
| 641883 | 2004 TV_{159} | — | October 6, 2004 | Kitt Peak | Spacewatch | · | 1.5 km | MPC · JPL |
| 641884 | 2004 TW_{161} | — | October 6, 2004 | Kitt Peak | Spacewatch | MAS | 710 m | MPC · JPL |
| 641885 | 2004 TX_{161} | — | October 6, 2004 | Kitt Peak | Spacewatch | PAD | 1.7 km | MPC · JPL |
| 641886 | 2004 TB_{165} | — | October 7, 2004 | Kitt Peak | Spacewatch | · | 1.6 km | MPC · JPL |
| 641887 | 2004 TD_{177} | — | October 4, 2004 | Kitt Peak | Spacewatch | · | 1.3 km | MPC · JPL |
| 641888 | 2004 TP_{177} | — | October 7, 2004 | Kitt Peak | Spacewatch | H | 440 m | MPC · JPL |
| 641889 | 2004 TJ_{179} | — | October 7, 2004 | Kitt Peak | Spacewatch | V | 520 m | MPC · JPL |
| 641890 | 2004 TG_{182} | — | October 7, 2004 | Kitt Peak | Spacewatch | · | 2.1 km | MPC · JPL |
| 641891 | 2004 TD_{187} | — | October 7, 2004 | Kitt Peak | Spacewatch | V | 520 m | MPC · JPL |
| 641892 | 2004 TA_{188} | — | October 7, 2004 | Kitt Peak | Spacewatch | AGN | 850 m | MPC · JPL |
| 641893 | 2004 TX_{188} | — | October 7, 2004 | Kitt Peak | Spacewatch | · | 950 m | MPC · JPL |
| 641894 | 2004 TB_{191} | — | October 7, 2004 | Kitt Peak | Spacewatch | VER | 2.6 km | MPC · JPL |
| 641895 | 2004 TC_{191} | — | October 7, 2004 | Kitt Peak | Spacewatch | · | 860 m | MPC · JPL |
| 641896 | 2004 TS_{201} | — | October 7, 2004 | Kitt Peak | Spacewatch | · | 1.3 km | MPC · JPL |
| 641897 | 2004 TQ_{208} | — | October 8, 2004 | Kitt Peak | Spacewatch | · | 1.7 km | MPC · JPL |
| 641898 | 2004 TJ_{226} | — | October 8, 2004 | Kitt Peak | Spacewatch | · | 1.3 km | MPC · JPL |
| 641899 | 2004 TV_{226} | — | October 8, 2004 | Kitt Peak | Spacewatch | · | 3.2 km | MPC · JPL |
| 641900 | 2004 TE_{233} | — | October 8, 2004 | Kitt Peak | Spacewatch | · | 1.6 km | MPC · JPL |

== 641901–642000 ==
back to top

| Designation | | | Discovery | | | Properties | | Ref |
| Permanent | Provisional | Named after | Date | Site | Discoverer(s) | Category | Diam. | Ref |
|---|---|---|---|---|---|---|---|---|
| 641901 | 2004 TR_{244} | — | October 7, 2004 | Kitt Peak | Spacewatch | AEO | 1.0 km | MPC · JPL |
| 641902 | 2004 TC_{249} | — | October 7, 2004 | Kitt Peak | Spacewatch | · | 840 m | MPC · JPL |
| 641903 | 2004 TE_{250} | — | October 7, 2004 | Kitt Peak | Spacewatch | · | 860 m | MPC · JPL |
| 641904 | 2004 TL_{254} | — | October 9, 2004 | Kitt Peak | Spacewatch | MAS | 650 m | MPC · JPL |
| 641905 | 2004 TB_{260} | — | October 9, 2004 | Kitt Peak | Spacewatch | · | 2.3 km | MPC · JPL |
| 641906 | 2004 TD_{263} | — | October 9, 2004 | Kitt Peak | Spacewatch | NYS | 820 m | MPC · JPL |
| 641907 | 2004 TE_{271} | — | October 9, 2004 | Kitt Peak | Spacewatch | V | 520 m | MPC · JPL |
| 641908 | 2004 TW_{281} | — | April 24, 2003 | Anderson Mesa | LONEOS | · | 1.2 km | MPC · JPL |
| 641909 | 2004 TM_{283} | — | October 8, 2004 | Kitt Peak | Spacewatch | · | 1.4 km | MPC · JPL |
| 641910 | 2004 TV_{289} | — | October 10, 2004 | Kitt Peak | Spacewatch | · | 2.8 km | MPC · JPL |
| 641911 | 2004 TN_{292} | — | October 10, 2004 | Kitt Peak | Spacewatch | · | 1.1 km | MPC · JPL |
| 641912 | 2004 TZ_{299} | — | October 8, 2004 | Socorro | LINEAR | · | 1.1 km | MPC · JPL |
| 641913 | 2004 TM_{300} | — | October 8, 2004 | Kitt Peak | Spacewatch | · | 1.4 km | MPC · JPL |
| 641914 | 2004 TB_{306} | — | October 10, 2004 | Socorro | LINEAR | · | 680 m | MPC · JPL |
| 641915 | 2004 TM_{308} | — | October 10, 2004 | Socorro | LINEAR | · | 2.2 km | MPC · JPL |
| 641916 | 2004 TH_{312} | — | October 11, 2004 | Kitt Peak | Spacewatch | · | 3.1 km | MPC · JPL |
| 641917 | 2004 TC_{314} | — | October 11, 2004 | Kitt Peak | Spacewatch | · | 1.5 km | MPC · JPL |
| 641918 | 2004 TP_{314} | — | October 11, 2004 | Kitt Peak | Spacewatch | H | 450 m | MPC · JPL |
| 641919 | 2004 TT_{315} | — | October 11, 2004 | Kitt Peak | Spacewatch | · | 1.4 km | MPC · JPL |
| 641920 | 2004 TJ_{316} | — | October 11, 2004 | Kitt Peak | Spacewatch | PAD | 1.3 km | MPC · JPL |
| 641921 | 2004 TL_{317} | — | October 11, 2004 | Kitt Peak | Spacewatch | HOF | 2.1 km | MPC · JPL |
| 641922 | 2004 TS_{318} | — | October 11, 2004 | Kitt Peak | Spacewatch | · | 1.8 km | MPC · JPL |
| 641923 | 2004 TX_{322} | — | October 11, 2004 | Kitt Peak | Spacewatch | · | 1.1 km | MPC · JPL |
| 641924 | 2004 TT_{331} | — | October 9, 2004 | Kitt Peak | Spacewatch | NYS | 850 m | MPC · JPL |
| 641925 | 2004 TW_{338} | — | October 12, 2004 | Kitt Peak | Spacewatch | · | 2.7 km | MPC · JPL |
| 641926 | 2004 TP_{342} | — | October 13, 2004 | Kitt Peak | Spacewatch | · | 900 m | MPC · JPL |
| 641927 | 2004 TB_{344} | — | October 15, 2004 | Kitt Peak | Spacewatch | · | 1.2 km | MPC · JPL |
| 641928 | 2004 TH_{347} | — | October 12, 2004 | Anderson Mesa | LONEOS | TIN | 1.0 km | MPC · JPL |
| 641929 | 2004 TC_{352} | — | October 11, 2004 | Kitt Peak | Deep Ecliptic Survey | · | 820 m | MPC · JPL |
| 641930 | 2004 TA_{354} | — | October 15, 2004 | Kitt Peak | Spacewatch | · | 2.1 km | MPC · JPL |
| 641931 | 2004 TV_{358} | — | October 6, 2004 | Kitt Peak | Spacewatch | · | 840 m | MPC · JPL |
| 641932 | 2004 TK_{360} | — | October 10, 2004 | Socorro | LINEAR | · | 1.6 km | MPC · JPL |
| 641933 | 2004 TC_{362} | — | October 15, 2004 | Mount Lemmon | Mount Lemmon Survey | V | 550 m | MPC · JPL |
| 641934 | 2004 TY_{362} | — | September 15, 2004 | Kitt Peak | Spacewatch | · | 1.6 km | MPC · JPL |
| 641935 | 2004 TU_{363} | — | October 9, 2004 | Kitt Peak | Spacewatch | · | 900 m | MPC · JPL |
| 641936 | 2004 TZ_{365} | — | October 2, 2013 | Kitt Peak | Spacewatch | · | 1.4 km | MPC · JPL |
| 641937 | 2004 TN_{372} | — | February 22, 2007 | Kitt Peak | Spacewatch | · | 2.5 km | MPC · JPL |
| 641938 | 2004 TM_{373} | — | October 15, 2004 | Kitt Peak | Spacewatch | NYS | 1.1 km | MPC · JPL |
| 641939 | 2004 TD_{374} | — | October 11, 2004 | Kitt Peak | Deep Ecliptic Survey | · | 1.7 km | MPC · JPL |
| 641940 | 2004 TO_{374} | — | October 5, 2004 | Kitt Peak | Spacewatch | · | 890 m | MPC · JPL |
| 641941 | 2004 TP_{374} | — | March 20, 2010 | Kitt Peak | Spacewatch | · | 880 m | MPC · JPL |
| 641942 | 2004 TJ_{375} | — | September 21, 2011 | Mount Lemmon | Mount Lemmon Survey | · | 710 m | MPC · JPL |
| 641943 | 2004 TE_{376} | — | October 3, 2008 | Mount Lemmon | Mount Lemmon Survey | MAS | 520 m | MPC · JPL |
| 641944 | 2004 TQ_{376} | — | April 5, 2014 | Haleakala | Pan-STARRS 1 | MAS | 580 m | MPC · JPL |
| 641945 | 2004 TX_{377} | — | October 10, 2004 | Kitt Peak | Deep Ecliptic Survey | · | 1.1 km | MPC · JPL |
| 641946 | 2004 TS_{378} | — | June 27, 2015 | Haleakala | Pan-STARRS 1 | NYS | 930 m | MPC · JPL |
| 641947 | 2004 TV_{378} | — | December 10, 2009 | Mount Lemmon | Mount Lemmon Survey | · | 1.6 km | MPC · JPL |
| 641948 | 2004 TY_{378} | — | January 26, 2017 | Mount Lemmon | Mount Lemmon Survey | · | 1.0 km | MPC · JPL |
| 641949 | 2004 TB_{379} | — | October 8, 2004 | Kitt Peak | Spacewatch | · | 2.7 km | MPC · JPL |
| 641950 | 2004 TP_{379} | — | October 8, 2004 | Kitt Peak | Spacewatch | · | 920 m | MPC · JPL |
| 641951 | 2004 TB_{380} | — | April 27, 2012 | Haleakala | Pan-STARRS 1 | AGN | 860 m | MPC · JPL |
| 641952 | 2004 TU_{380} | — | October 15, 2004 | Kitt Peak | Deep Ecliptic Survey | · | 1.5 km | MPC · JPL |
| 641953 | 2004 TB_{381} | — | March 23, 2006 | Mount Lemmon | Mount Lemmon Survey | H | 480 m | MPC · JPL |
| 641954 | 2004 TL_{381} | — | October 3, 2013 | Haleakala | Pan-STARRS 1 | · | 1.5 km | MPC · JPL |
| 641955 | 2004 TR_{381} | — | October 26, 2009 | Kitt Peak | Spacewatch | · | 1.5 km | MPC · JPL |
| 641956 | 2004 TW_{381} | — | October 12, 2004 | Kitt Peak | Spacewatch | · | 560 m | MPC · JPL |
| 641957 | 2004 TE_{382} | — | May 30, 2003 | Cerro Tololo | Deep Ecliptic Survey | MAS | 720 m | MPC · JPL |
| 641958 | 2004 TG_{382} | — | September 18, 2010 | Mount Lemmon | Mount Lemmon Survey | · | 3.0 km | MPC · JPL |
| 641959 | 2004 TK_{382} | — | August 14, 2004 | Cerro Tololo | Deep Ecliptic Survey | · | 2.7 km | MPC · JPL |
| 641960 | 2004 TN_{382} | — | September 24, 2008 | Mount Lemmon | Mount Lemmon Survey | MAS | 570 m | MPC · JPL |
| 641961 | 2004 TD_{384} | — | May 6, 2017 | Haleakala | Pan-STARRS 1 | AGN | 1.0 km | MPC · JPL |
| 641962 | 2004 TL_{384} | — | August 12, 2015 | Haleakala | Pan-STARRS 1 | · | 690 m | MPC · JPL |
| 641963 | 2004 TU_{384} | — | October 12, 2004 | Kitt Peak | Spacewatch | DOR | 1.7 km | MPC · JPL |
| 641964 | 2004 TA_{387} | — | October 12, 2004 | Kitt Peak | Spacewatch | · | 540 m | MPC · JPL |
| 641965 | 2004 TE_{387} | — | October 6, 2004 | Kitt Peak | Spacewatch | · | 1.2 km | MPC · JPL |
| 641966 | 2004 UB_{10} | — | October 11, 2004 | Palomar | NEAT | H | 520 m | MPC · JPL |
| 641967 | 2004 UM_{11} | — | October 1, 2013 | Mount Lemmon | Mount Lemmon Survey | (5) | 1.5 km | MPC · JPL |
| 641968 | 2004 UO_{11} | — | October 4, 2013 | Mount Lemmon | Mount Lemmon Survey | AGN | 1.1 km | MPC · JPL |
| 641969 | 2004 VW_{5} | — | August 11, 2004 | Socorro | LINEAR | · | 2.2 km | MPC · JPL |
| 641970 | 2004 VJ_{11} | — | November 3, 2004 | Palomar | NEAT | · | 1.4 km | MPC · JPL |
| 641971 | 2004 VP_{11} | — | November 3, 2004 | Palomar | NEAT | · | 2.5 km | MPC · JPL |
| 641972 | 2004 VD_{15} | — | October 15, 2004 | Kitt Peak | Spacewatch | · | 1.7 km | MPC · JPL |
| 641973 | 2004 VC_{21} | — | September 27, 2000 | Kitt Peak | Spacewatch | MAS | 780 m | MPC · JPL |
| 641974 | 2004 VU_{34} | — | November 3, 2004 | Kitt Peak | Spacewatch | · | 1.7 km | MPC · JPL |
| 641975 | 2004 VR_{44} | — | November 4, 2004 | Kitt Peak | Spacewatch | · | 2.0 km | MPC · JPL |
| 641976 | 2004 VZ_{44} | — | November 4, 2004 | Kitt Peak | Spacewatch | · | 770 m | MPC · JPL |
| 641977 | 2004 VD_{78} | — | November 16, 2004 | Cordell-Lorenz | D. T. Durig, Parham, L. M. | · | 1.5 km | MPC · JPL |
| 641978 | 2004 VX_{82} | — | November 10, 2004 | Kitt Peak | Spacewatch | · | 1.1 km | MPC · JPL |
| 641979 | 2004 VW_{87} | — | November 11, 2004 | Kitt Peak | Spacewatch | · | 980 m | MPC · JPL |
| 641980 | 2004 VV_{88} | — | November 11, 2004 | Kitt Peak | Spacewatch | · | 2.5 km | MPC · JPL |
| 641981 | 2004 VT_{89} | — | November 11, 2004 | Kitt Peak | Spacewatch | · | 1.5 km | MPC · JPL |
| 641982 | 2004 VQ_{98} | — | November 9, 2004 | Mauna Kea | Veillet, C. | MRX | 990 m | MPC · JPL |
| 641983 | 2004 VU_{123} | — | October 8, 2004 | Kitt Peak | Spacewatch | MAS | 580 m | MPC · JPL |
| 641984 | 2004 VS_{131} | — | May 12, 2007 | Mount Lemmon | Mount Lemmon Survey | · | 1.1 km | MPC · JPL |
| 641985 | 2004 VA_{133} | — | February 13, 2013 | Haleakala | Pan-STARRS 1 | V | 540 m | MPC · JPL |
| 641986 | 2004 VB_{133} | — | December 8, 2012 | Mount Lemmon | Mount Lemmon Survey | NYS | 1.1 km | MPC · JPL |
| 641987 | 2004 VX_{133} | — | March 28, 2012 | Mount Lemmon | Mount Lemmon Survey | · | 1.8 km | MPC · JPL |
| 641988 | 2004 VZ_{133} | — | September 26, 2011 | Haleakala | Pan-STARRS 1 | · | 930 m | MPC · JPL |
| 641989 | 2004 VK_{134} | — | April 1, 2016 | Haleakala | Pan-STARRS 1 | · | 1.6 km | MPC · JPL |
| 641990 | 2004 VN_{134} | — | November 3, 2004 | Kitt Peak | Spacewatch | · | 1.0 km | MPC · JPL |
| 641991 | 2004 VA_{135} | — | August 30, 2013 | Haleakala | Pan-STARRS 1 | BRA | 1.4 km | MPC · JPL |
| 641992 | 2004 VD_{135} | — | September 5, 2008 | Kitt Peak | Spacewatch | WIT | 1.0 km | MPC · JPL |
| 641993 | 2004 VE_{135} | — | October 5, 2013 | Haleakala | Pan-STARRS 1 | · | 1.5 km | MPC · JPL |
| 641994 | 2004 VG_{135} | — | January 22, 2013 | Mount Lemmon | Mount Lemmon Survey | · | 820 m | MPC · JPL |
| 641995 | 2004 VO_{136} | — | October 3, 2013 | Haleakala | Pan-STARRS 1 | · | 1.6 km | MPC · JPL |
| 641996 | 2004 VL_{138} | — | November 10, 2004 | Kitt Peak | Spacewatch | · | 2.8 km | MPC · JPL |
| 641997 | 2004 WQ | — | November 4, 2004 | Anderson Mesa | LONEOS | · | 1.7 km | MPC · JPL |
| 641998 | 2004 WU_{2} | — | September 12, 2004 | Palomar | NEAT | · | 1.8 km | MPC · JPL |
| 641999 | 2004 WP_{13} | — | April 29, 2014 | Haleakala | Pan-STARRS 1 | PHO | 800 m | MPC · JPL |
| 642000 | 2004 WV_{13} | — | September 14, 2013 | Haleakala | Pan-STARRS 1 | · | 1.5 km | MPC · JPL |

back to top
