= Károly Nagy =

Hungarian astronomer (1797–1868)

Károly Nagy (6 December 1797 – 2 March 1868) was an astronomer, mathematician, chemist and politician from the Austrian Empire. His observatory in Bicske was one of the most well-equipped observatories of Europe in the 19th century. It was destroyed during World War I. Only its main tower stands now.

== Life ==
Nagy's proponent was Kázmér the minister for foreign affairs in the Cabinet of Bertalan Szemere, the Prime Minister of Hungary at that time. After the Hungarian Revolution of 1848, he was imprisoned in the "Hungarian Bastille" Újépület. He offered his estate and his observatory to the Austrian emperor. Soon after he emigrated to Paris. He was the first Hungarian scientist who met an American president, Andrew Jackson, and the first Hungarian traveler, who wrote detailed coverage of the life of the Native Americans.

== Honors ==
Asteroid 115059 Nagykároly, discovered by Krisztián Sárneczky and Brigitta Sipőcz at Piszkéstető Station in 2003, was named in his memory. The official naming citation was published by the Minor Planet Center on 23 September 2010 (M.P.C. 72201).
