= Meanings of minor-planet names: 115001–116000 =

As minor planet discoveries are confirmed, they are given a permanent number by the IAU's Minor Planet Center (MPC), and the discoverers can then submit names for them, following the IAU's naming conventions. The list below concerns those minor planets in the specified number-range that have received names, and explains the meanings of those names.

Official naming citations of newly named small Solar System bodies are approved and published in a bulletin by IAU's Working Group for Small Bodies Nomenclature (WGSBN). Before May 2021, citations were published in MPC's Minor Planet Circulars for many decades. Recent citations can also be found on the JPL Small-Body Database (SBDB). Until his death in 2016, German astronomer Lutz D. Schmadel compiled these citations into the Dictionary of Minor Planet Names (DMP) and regularly updated the collection.

Based on Paul Herget's The Names of the Minor Planets, Schmadel also researched the unclear origin of numerous asteroids, most of which had been named prior to World War II. This article incorporates text from this source, which is in the public domain: SBDB New namings may only be added to this list below after official publication as the preannouncement of names is condemned. The WGSBN publishes a comprehensive guideline for the naming rules of non-cometary small Solar System bodies.

== 115001–115100 ==
Named minor planet	Provisional	This minor planet was named for...	Ref · Catalog
115015 Chang Díaz	2003 QX_{84}	Franklin Chang Díaz (born 1950) was an astronaut for 25 years and flew seven Space Shuttle missions from 1986 to 2002. He logged more than 1600 hours in space and helped to deploy the Galileo spacecraft to Jupiter. He is the first Costa Rican astronaut and is also of Chinese descent.	JPL · 115015
115051 Safaeinili	2003 RC_{6}	Ali Safaeinili (1964–2009), radar scientist and electrical engineer at the Jet Propulsion Laboratory	JPL · 115051
115058 Tassantal	2003 RH_{8}	Antal Tass (1876–1937), Hungarian astronomer, and director of Konkoly Observatory from 1916 to 1936	JPL · 115058
115059 Nagykároly	2003 RJ_{8}	Károly Nagy (1797–1868), Hungarian astronomer, mathematician, chemist and politician	JPL · 115059

== 115101–115200 ==
back to top

Named minor planet	Provisional	This minor planet was named for...	Ref · Catalog
There are no named minor planets in this number range

== 115201–115300 ==
back to top

Named minor planet	Provisional	This minor planet was named for...	Ref · Catalog
115210 Mutvicens	2003 SY_{124}	Vicens Mut (1614–1687), a Mallorcan historian, military engineer and one of the most important astronomers of his time.	IAU · 115210
115254 Fényi	2003 SF_{158}	Gyula Fényi (1845–1927), Hungarian Jesuit and astronomer	JPL · 115254

== 115301–115400 ==
back to top

Named minor planet	Provisional	This minor planet was named for...	Ref · Catalog
115312 Whither	2003 SP_{215}	Whitney Young (born 1990) and Heather Young (born 1992), granddaughters of American astronomer James Whitney Young who discovered this minor planet	JPL · 115312
115326 Wehinger	2003 SC_{221}	Peter A. Wehinger (born 1938), American astronomer, and development officer for the Giant Magellan Telescope	JPL · 115326
115331 Shrylmiles	2003 SL_{224}	Shryl Miles, American from Benson, Arizona, who has campaigned against light pollution	JPL · 115331

== 115401–115500 ==
back to top

Named minor planet	Provisional	This minor planet was named for...	Ref · Catalog
115434 Kellyfast	2003 TU_{2}	Kelly E. Fast (born 1968), a program scientist for the MAVEN spacecraft at NASA	JPL · 115434
115449 Robson	2003 TG_{10}	Monty Robson, American founder and director of the John J. McCarthy Observatory (932) in New Milford, Connecticut	JPL · 115449
115477 Brantanica	2003 UK_{8}	Brandon Danielson (born 1994), Brittany Danielson (born 1996) and Monica Rahn (born 2006), grandchildren of American astronomer James Whitney Young, who discovered this minor planet	JPL · 115477
115492 Watonga	2003 UR_{22}	Watonga, Oklahoma, the birthplace of the discoverer	JPL · 115492

== 115501–115600 ==
back to top

Named minor planet	Provisional	This minor planet was named for...	Ref · Catalog
115561 Frankherbert	2003 UF_{80}	Frank Herbert (1920–1986), American science fiction writer best known for his novel Dune	JPL · 115561

== 115601–115700 ==
back to top

Named minor planet	Provisional	This minor planet was named for...	Ref · Catalog
There are no named minor planets in this number range

== 115701–115800 ==
back to top

Named minor planet	Provisional	This minor planet was named for...	Ref · Catalog
There are no named minor planets in this number range

== 115801–115900 ==
back to top

Named minor planet	Provisional	This minor planet was named for...	Ref · Catalog
115801 Punahou	2003 UW_{236}	Punahou School, a private college preparatory school in Honolulu, Hawaii, United States	JPL · 115801
115885 Ganz	2003 VL_{1}	Ábrahám Ganz (1814–1867), Swiss-Hungarian technical engineer	JPL · 115885
115891 Scottmichael	2003 VW_{2}	Scott Young (born 1996) and Michael Young (born 1998), grandsons of American astronomer James Whitney Young who discovered this minor planet	JPL · 115891

== 115901–116000 ==
back to top

Named minor planet	Provisional	This minor planet was named for...	Ref · Catalog
115950 Kocherpeter	2003 WT_{33}	Peter Kocher (born 1939), Swiss amateur astronomer and discoverer of minor planets	JPL · 115950

back to top

Preceded by 114,001–115,000	Meanings of minor-planet names List of minor planets: 115,001–116,000	Succeeded by 116,001–117,000
