= List of minor planets: 115001–116000 =

The following is a partial list of minor planets, running from minor-planet number 115001 through 116000, inclusive. The primary data for this and other partial lists is based on JPL's "Small-Body Orbital Elements" and data available from the Minor Planet Center. Critical list information is also provided by the MPC, unless otherwise specified from Lowell Observatory. A detailed description of the table's columns and additional sources are given on the main page including a complete list of every page in this series, and a statistical break-up on the dynamical classification of minor planets.

Also see the summary list of all named bodies in numerical and alphabetical order, and the corresponding naming citations for the number range of this particular list. New namings may only be added to this list after official publication, as the preannouncement of names is condemned by the Working Group for Small Bodies Nomenclature of the International Astronomical Union.

Near-Earth obj.	MBA (inner)	MBA (outer)	Centaur
Mars-crosser	MBA (middle)	Jupiter trojan	Trans-Neptunian obj.
Unclassified

== 115001–115100 ==
Designation			Discovery			Properties		Ref
Permanent	Provisional	Named after	Date	Site	Discoverer(s)	Category	Diam.	Ref
115001	2003 QF_{75}	—	August 24, 2003	Socorro	LINEAR	·	6.2 km	MPC · JPL
115002	2003 QG_{75}	—	August 24, 2003	Socorro	LINEAR	·	1.5 km	MPC · JPL
115003	2003 QL_{75}	—	August 24, 2003	Socorro	LINEAR	EOS	3.8 km	MPC · JPL
115004	2003 QU_{76}	—	August 24, 2003	Socorro	LINEAR	·	4.0 km	MPC · JPL
115005	2003 QW_{77}	—	August 24, 2003	Socorro	LINEAR	·	1.3 km	MPC · JPL
115006	2003 QX_{77}	—	August 24, 2003	Socorro	LINEAR	(2076)	1.3 km	MPC · JPL
115007	2003 QZ_{77}	—	August 24, 2003	Socorro	LINEAR	TIR	3.7 km	MPC · JPL
115008	2003 QC_{78}	—	August 24, 2003	Socorro	LINEAR	·	5.4 km	MPC · JPL
115009	2003 QF_{78}	—	August 24, 2003	Socorro	LINEAR	·	8.4 km	MPC · JPL
115010	2003 QS_{78}	—	August 24, 2003	Socorro	LINEAR	·	2.2 km	MPC · JPL
115011	2003 QY_{78}	—	August 24, 2003	Socorro	LINEAR	PHO	1.7 km	MPC · JPL
115012	2003 QF_{79}	—	August 24, 2003	Socorro	LINEAR	·	5.2 km	MPC · JPL
115013	2003 QG_{79}	—	August 24, 2003	Socorro	LINEAR	EUN	3.7 km	MPC · JPL
115014	2003 QL_{79}	—	August 25, 2003	Socorro	LINEAR	PHO	1.8 km	MPC · JPL
115015 Chang Díaz	2003 QX_{84}	Chang Díaz	August 24, 2003	Cerro Tololo	M. W. Buie	·	6.1 km	MPC · JPL
115016	2003 QQ_{87}	—	August 25, 2003	Socorro	LINEAR	·	3.2 km	MPC · JPL
115017	2003 QU_{88}	—	August 25, 2003	Socorro	LINEAR	·	5.9 km	MPC · JPL
115018	2003 QJ_{89}	—	August 26, 2003	Socorro	LINEAR	·	1.6 km	MPC · JPL
115019	2003 QS_{89}	—	August 28, 2003	Socorro	LINEAR	·	6.4 km	MPC · JPL
115020	2003 QQ_{90}	—	August 28, 2003	Socorro	LINEAR	·	2.7 km	MPC · JPL
115021	2003 QD_{92}	—	August 28, 2003	Haleakala	NEAT	·	7.0 km	MPC · JPL
115022	2003 QK_{93}	—	August 28, 2003	Haleakala	NEAT	·	1.3 km	MPC · JPL
115023	2003 QX_{94}	—	August 29, 2003	Haleakala	NEAT	·	7.1 km	MPC · JPL
115024	2003 QP_{98}	—	August 30, 2003	Kitt Peak	Spacewatch	V	970 m	MPC · JPL
115025	2003 QC_{100}	—	August 28, 2003	Palomar	NEAT	URS	7.3 km	MPC · JPL
115026	2003 QG_{101}	—	August 28, 2003	Haleakala	NEAT	·	900 m	MPC · JPL
115027	2003 QV_{101}	—	August 29, 2003	Haleakala	NEAT	·	6.4 km	MPC · JPL
115028	2003 QY_{102}	—	August 31, 2003	Kitt Peak	Spacewatch	EUN	1.8 km	MPC · JPL
115029	2003 QZ_{102}	—	August 31, 2003	Socorro	LINEAR	·	4.3 km	MPC · JPL
115030	2003 QS_{103}	—	August 31, 2003	Haleakala	NEAT	·	2.4 km	MPC · JPL
115031	2003 QN_{104}	—	August 28, 2003	Socorro	LINEAR	H	1.3 km	MPC · JPL
115032	2003 QX_{104}	—	August 29, 2003	Haleakala	NEAT	THB	7.7 km	MPC · JPL
115033	2003 QC_{105}	—	August 31, 2003	Haleakala	NEAT	·	1.3 km	MPC · JPL
115034	2003 QH_{105}	—	August 31, 2003	Haleakala	NEAT	·	3.5 km	MPC · JPL
115035	2003 QU_{106}	—	August 30, 2003	Haleakala	NEAT	·	1.5 km	MPC · JPL
115036	2003 QZ_{106}	—	August 30, 2003	Kitt Peak	Spacewatch	ADE	4.1 km	MPC · JPL
115037	2003 QJ_{108}	—	August 31, 2003	Socorro	LINEAR	H	1.0 km	MPC · JPL
115038	2003 QK_{108}	—	August 31, 2003	Socorro	LINEAR	·	1.6 km	MPC · JPL
115039	2003 QB_{109}	—	August 31, 2003	Socorro	LINEAR	V	1.5 km	MPC · JPL
115040	2003 QY_{110}	—	August 31, 2003	Socorro	LINEAR	·	1.2 km	MPC · JPL
115041	2003 QA_{111}	—	August 31, 2003	Socorro	LINEAR	·	6.1 km	MPC · JPL
115042	2003 QT_{112}	—	August 20, 2003	Socorro	LINEAR	HNS	3.9 km	MPC · JPL
115043	2003 RH	—	September 1, 2003	Socorro	LINEAR	EOS	4.7 km	MPC · JPL
115044	2003 RQ	—	September 2, 2003	Socorro	LINEAR	·	2.0 km	MPC · JPL
115045	2003 RB_{1}	—	September 1, 2003	Socorro	LINEAR	EUN	3.9 km	MPC · JPL
115046	2003 RV_{3}	—	September 1, 2003	Socorro	LINEAR	V	1.3 km	MPC · JPL
115047	2003 RH_{4}	—	September 2, 2003	Socorro	LINEAR	·	6.2 km	MPC · JPL
115048	2003 RU_{4}	—	September 3, 2003	Haleakala	NEAT	·	2.3 km	MPC · JPL
115049	2003 RY_{4}	—	September 3, 2003	Haleakala	NEAT	·	2.8 km	MPC · JPL
115050	2003 RS_{5}	—	September 3, 2003	Haleakala	NEAT	V	1.3 km	MPC · JPL
115051 Safaeinili	2003 RC_{6}	Safaeinili	September 4, 2003	Campo Imperatore	CINEOS	·	6.2 km	MPC · JPL
115052	2003 RD_{6}	—	September 5, 2003	Socorro	LINEAR	AMO +1km	1.1 km	MPC · JPL
115053	2003 RP_{6}	—	September 1, 2003	Socorro	LINEAR	·	4.5 km	MPC · JPL
115054	2003 RR_{6}	—	September 1, 2003	Socorro	LINEAR	·	4.5 km	MPC · JPL
115055	2003 RU_{6}	—	September 3, 2003	Črni Vrh	Skvarč, J.	·	4.3 km	MPC · JPL
115056	2003 RZ_{6}	—	September 4, 2003	Socorro	LINEAR	·	2.8 km	MPC · JPL
115057	2003 RC_{7}	—	September 4, 2003	Socorro	LINEAR	·	4.0 km	MPC · JPL
115058 Tassantal	2003 RH_{8}	Tassantal	September 4, 2003	Piszkéstető	K. Sárneczky, B. Sipőcz	·	1.7 km	MPC · JPL
115059 Nagykároly	2003 RJ_{8}	Nagykároly	September 5, 2003	Piszkéstető	K. Sárneczky, B. Sipőcz	·	4.8 km	MPC · JPL
115060	2003 RD_{12}	—	September 13, 2003	Haleakala	NEAT	·	2.4 km	MPC · JPL
115061	2003 RG_{13}	—	September 14, 2003	Haleakala	NEAT	·	2.4 km	MPC · JPL
115062	2003 RT_{14}	—	September 13, 2003	Haleakala	NEAT	·	2.7 km	MPC · JPL
115063	2003 RU_{14}	—	September 14, 2003	Haleakala	NEAT	·	1.5 km	MPC · JPL
115064	2003 RZ_{14}	—	September 14, 2003	Haleakala	NEAT	·	3.7 km	MPC · JPL
115065	2003 RN_{18}	—	September 15, 2003	Anderson Mesa	LONEOS	V	1.4 km	MPC · JPL
115066	2003 RH_{19}	—	September 15, 2003	Anderson Mesa	LONEOS	GEF	3.5 km	MPC · JPL
115067	2003 RQ_{19}	—	September 15, 2003	Anderson Mesa	LONEOS	·	2.7 km	MPC · JPL
115068	2003 RY_{20}	—	September 15, 2003	Anderson Mesa	LONEOS	·	3.3 km	MPC · JPL
115069	2003 RE_{21}	—	September 15, 2003	Anderson Mesa	LONEOS	3:2	8.5 km	MPC · JPL
115070	2003 RT_{21}	—	September 13, 2003	Haleakala	NEAT	·	5.6 km	MPC · JPL
115071	2003 RG_{22}	—	September 15, 2003	Haleakala	NEAT	·	2.1 km	MPC · JPL
115072	2003 RO_{22}	—	September 15, 2003	Haleakala	NEAT	·	7.4 km	MPC · JPL
115073	2003 RO_{23}	—	September 14, 2003	Palomar	NEAT	·	2.9 km	MPC · JPL
115074	2003 RW_{23}	—	September 14, 2003	Palomar	NEAT	PHO	3.0 km	MPC · JPL
115075	2003 RA_{24}	—	September 14, 2003	Haleakala	NEAT	·	2.3 km	MPC · JPL
115076	2003 RD_{24}	—	September 15, 2003	Anderson Mesa	LONEOS	·	1.8 km	MPC · JPL
115077	2003 RL_{25}	—	September 15, 2003	Palomar	NEAT	URS	7.3 km	MPC · JPL
115078	2003 RJ_{26}	—	September 3, 2003	Haleakala	NEAT	MAR	2.0 km	MPC · JPL
115079	2003 SA_{3}	—	September 16, 2003	Palomar	NEAT	·	1.2 km	MPC · JPL
115080	2003 SH_{3}	—	September 16, 2003	Palomar	NEAT	·	3.3 km	MPC · JPL
115081	2003 SQ_{3}	—	September 16, 2003	Kitt Peak	Spacewatch	MAS	980 m	MPC · JPL
115082	2003 SP_{6}	—	September 17, 2003	Desert Eagle	W. K. Y. Yeung	·	1.5 km	MPC · JPL
115083	2003 SZ_{7}	—	September 16, 2003	Palomar	NEAT	V	1.3 km	MPC · JPL
115084	2003 SM_{9}	—	September 17, 2003	Kitt Peak	Spacewatch	EUN	2.2 km	MPC · JPL
115085	2003 SK_{11}	—	September 16, 2003	Kitt Peak	Spacewatch	AGN	2.3 km	MPC · JPL
115086	2003 SP_{11}	—	September 16, 2003	Kitt Peak	Spacewatch	·	3.2 km	MPC · JPL
115087	2003 SP_{13}	—	September 16, 2003	Kitt Peak	Spacewatch	·	4.5 km	MPC · JPL
115088	2003 SU_{13}	—	September 16, 2003	Kitt Peak	Spacewatch	3:2 · SHU	9.3 km	MPC · JPL
115089	2003 SF_{14}	—	September 17, 2003	Kitt Peak	Spacewatch	·	5.5 km	MPC · JPL
115090	2003 SM_{14}	—	September 17, 2003	Kitt Peak	Spacewatch	MAS	1.3 km	MPC · JPL
115091	2003 SB_{15}	—	September 17, 2003	Kitt Peak	Spacewatch	·	3.1 km	MPC · JPL
115092	2003 SH_{15}	—	September 16, 2003	Kitt Peak	Spacewatch	·	5.7 km	MPC · JPL
115093	2003 SQ_{16}	—	September 17, 2003	Goodricke-Pigott	R. A. Tucker	·	1.6 km	MPC · JPL
115094	2003 SZ_{16}	—	September 17, 2003	Kitt Peak	Spacewatch	·	2.7 km	MPC · JPL
115095	2003 SB_{17}	—	September 17, 2003	Kitt Peak	Spacewatch	PAD	4.0 km	MPC · JPL
115096	2003 SW_{17}	—	September 17, 2003	Kitt Peak	Spacewatch	·	1.5 km	MPC · JPL
115097	2003 SK_{18}	—	September 16, 2003	Socorro	LINEAR	T_{j} (2.98) · HIL · 3:2 · (6124)	15 km	MPC · JPL
115098	2003 SN_{18}	—	September 16, 2003	Kitt Peak	Spacewatch	ADE	3.8 km	MPC · JPL
115099	2003 SA_{22}	—	September 16, 2003	Kitt Peak	Spacewatch	·	1.2 km	MPC · JPL
115100	2003 SY_{22}	—	September 16, 2003	Palomar	NEAT	(16286)	3.4 km	MPC · JPL

== 115101–115200 ==
back to top

Designation			Discovery			Properties		Ref
Permanent	Provisional	Named after	Date	Site	Discoverer(s)	Category	Diam.	Ref
115101	2003 SD_{23}	—	September 16, 2003	Palomar	NEAT	·	1.5 km	MPC · JPL
115102	2003 SP_{24}	—	September 17, 2003	Socorro	LINEAR	·	4.4 km	MPC · JPL
115103	2003 SK_{25}	—	September 17, 2003	Kitt Peak	Spacewatch	·	5.0 km	MPC · JPL
115104	2003 SW_{25}	—	September 17, 2003	Haleakala	NEAT	·	1.4 km	MPC · JPL
115105	2003 SQ_{26}	—	September 17, 2003	Haleakala	NEAT	·	1.5 km	MPC · JPL
115106	2003 SF_{27}	—	September 18, 2003	Socorro	LINEAR	V	1.1 km	MPC · JPL
115107	2003 ST_{30}	—	September 18, 2003	Kitt Peak	Spacewatch	KOR	2.9 km	MPC · JPL
115108	2003 SA_{31}	—	September 18, 2003	Palomar	NEAT	GEF	2.9 km	MPC · JPL
115109	2003 SK_{32}	—	September 17, 2003	Palomar	NEAT	·	2.6 km	MPC · JPL
115110	2003 SR_{33}	—	September 18, 2003	Socorro	LINEAR	·	1.1 km	MPC · JPL
115111	2003 ST_{35}	—	September 16, 2003	Kitt Peak	Spacewatch	·	1.3 km	MPC · JPL
115112	2003 SQ_{37}	—	September 16, 2003	Palomar	NEAT	·	2.7 km	MPC · JPL
115113	2003 SN_{38}	—	September 16, 2003	Palomar	NEAT	·	2.9 km	MPC · JPL
115114	2003 SB_{39}	—	September 16, 2003	Palomar	NEAT	·	7.3 km	MPC · JPL
115115	2003 SX_{39}	—	September 16, 2003	Palomar	NEAT	·	3.2 km	MPC · JPL
115116	2003 SE_{40}	—	September 16, 2003	Palomar	NEAT	·	4.8 km	MPC · JPL
115117	2003 SQ_{41}	—	September 18, 2003	Palomar	NEAT	·	8.2 km	MPC · JPL
115118	2003 SB_{44}	—	September 16, 2003	Anderson Mesa	LONEOS	·	2.8 km	MPC · JPL
115119	2003 SP_{44}	—	September 16, 2003	Anderson Mesa	LONEOS	(5)	2.2 km	MPC · JPL
115120	2003 SV_{44}	—	September 16, 2003	Anderson Mesa	LONEOS	·	3.6 km	MPC · JPL
115121	2003 SP_{46}	—	September 16, 2003	Anderson Mesa	LONEOS	·	4.6 km	MPC · JPL
115122	2003 SQ_{46}	—	September 16, 2003	Anderson Mesa	LONEOS	HNS	2.8 km	MPC · JPL
115123	2003 SR_{47}	—	September 18, 2003	Palomar	NEAT	·	5.3 km	MPC · JPL
115124	2003 ST_{47}	—	September 18, 2003	Palomar	NEAT	PHO	2.1 km	MPC · JPL
115125	2003 SA_{48}	—	September 18, 2003	Palomar	NEAT	V	1.2 km	MPC · JPL
115126	2003 SC_{49}	—	September 18, 2003	Palomar	NEAT	EUN	1.8 km	MPC · JPL
115127	2003 SJ_{49}	—	September 18, 2003	Palomar	NEAT	·	4.0 km	MPC · JPL
115128	2003 SC_{51}	—	September 18, 2003	Palomar	NEAT	URS	8.2 km	MPC · JPL
115129	2003 SL_{52}	—	September 18, 2003	Palomar	NEAT	·	3.2 km	MPC · JPL
115130	2003 SV_{52}	—	September 19, 2003	Palomar	NEAT	MRX	1.9 km	MPC · JPL
115131	2003 SB_{53}	—	September 19, 2003	Palomar	NEAT	·	2.2 km	MPC · JPL
115132	2003 SM_{53}	—	September 16, 2003	Kitt Peak	Spacewatch	·	3.4 km	MPC · JPL
115133	2003 SN_{53}	—	September 16, 2003	Socorro	LINEAR	·	2.8 km	MPC · JPL
115134	2003 SW_{55}	—	September 16, 2003	Anderson Mesa	LONEOS	V	1.3 km	MPC · JPL
115135	2003 SK_{57}	—	September 16, 2003	Kitt Peak	Spacewatch	BRA	2.5 km	MPC · JPL
115136	2003 SN_{57}	—	September 16, 2003	Kitt Peak	Spacewatch	MAR	1.9 km	MPC · JPL
115137	2003 SX_{57}	—	September 16, 2003	Kitt Peak	Spacewatch	·	3.0 km	MPC · JPL
115138	2003 SE_{58}	—	September 17, 2003	Anderson Mesa	LONEOS	·	4.7 km	MPC · JPL
115139	2003 SB_{59}	—	September 17, 2003	Anderson Mesa	LONEOS	·	3.3 km	MPC · JPL
115140	2003 SE_{59}	—	September 17, 2003	Anderson Mesa	LONEOS	·	7.3 km	MPC · JPL
115141	2003 SZ_{61}	—	September 17, 2003	Socorro	LINEAR	·	6.6 km	MPC · JPL
115142	2003 SM_{64}	—	September 18, 2003	Campo Imperatore	CINEOS	·	2.0 km	MPC · JPL
115143	2003 SO_{64}	—	September 18, 2003	Campo Imperatore	CINEOS	·	2.3 km	MPC · JPL
115144	2003 SQ_{64}	—	September 18, 2003	Campo Imperatore	CINEOS	MAS	1.5 km	MPC · JPL
115145	2003 SD_{65}	—	September 18, 2003	Campo Imperatore	CINEOS	·	3.7 km	MPC · JPL
115146	2003 SK_{66}	—	September 18, 2003	Campo Imperatore	CINEOS	·	3.5 km	MPC · JPL
115147	2003 SU_{66}	—	September 19, 2003	Campo Imperatore	CINEOS	EOS	3.3 km	MPC · JPL
115148	2003 SZ_{66}	—	September 19, 2003	Campo Imperatore	CINEOS	·	2.2 km	MPC · JPL
115149	2003 SA_{67}	—	September 19, 2003	Socorro	LINEAR	·	4.0 km	MPC · JPL
115150	2003 SH_{67}	—	September 19, 2003	Socorro	LINEAR	·	1.2 km	MPC · JPL
115151	2003 SP_{67}	—	September 19, 2003	Socorro	LINEAR	·	3.1 km	MPC · JPL
115152	2003 SA_{68}	—	September 17, 2003	Desert Eagle	W. K. Y. Yeung	(21344)	3.5 km	MPC · JPL
115153	2003 SB_{69}	—	September 17, 2003	Kitt Peak	Spacewatch	slow	1.8 km	MPC · JPL
115154	2003 SN_{70}	—	September 17, 2003	Kitt Peak	Spacewatch	·	3.8 km	MPC · JPL
115155	2003 SJ_{71}	—	September 18, 2003	Kitt Peak	Spacewatch	V	1.2 km	MPC · JPL
115156	2003 SR_{71}	—	September 18, 2003	Kitt Peak	Spacewatch	·	2.5 km	MPC · JPL
115157	2003 SG_{73}	—	September 18, 2003	Kitt Peak	Spacewatch	KOR	3.1 km	MPC · JPL
115158	2003 SA_{74}	—	September 18, 2003	Kitt Peak	Spacewatch	·	2.0 km	MPC · JPL
115159	2003 SP_{75}	—	September 18, 2003	Kitt Peak	Spacewatch	EUN	4.6 km	MPC · JPL
115160	2003 SF_{76}	—	September 18, 2003	Kitt Peak	Spacewatch	·	1.0 km	MPC · JPL
115161	2003 SH_{76}	—	September 18, 2003	Kitt Peak	Spacewatch	THM	4.7 km	MPC · JPL
115162	2003 SL_{76}	—	September 18, 2003	Kitt Peak	Spacewatch	NYS	2.0 km	MPC · JPL
115163	2003 SN_{76}	—	September 18, 2003	Kitt Peak	Spacewatch	THM	4.3 km	MPC · JPL
115164	2003 SJ_{80}	—	September 19, 2003	Kitt Peak	Spacewatch	·	1.3 km	MPC · JPL
115165	2003 SL_{80}	—	September 19, 2003	Kitt Peak	Spacewatch	THM	5.9 km	MPC · JPL
115166	2003 SM_{80}	—	September 19, 2003	Kitt Peak	Spacewatch	·	1.3 km	MPC · JPL
115167	2003 SR_{80}	—	September 19, 2003	Kitt Peak	Spacewatch	·	1.2 km	MPC · JPL
115168	2003 SV_{80}	—	September 19, 2003	Haleakala	NEAT	·	2.8 km	MPC · JPL
115169	2003 SW_{80}	—	September 19, 2003	Kitt Peak	Spacewatch	EUN	1.9 km	MPC · JPL
115170	2003 SF_{81}	—	September 19, 2003	Kitt Peak	Spacewatch	HIL · 3:2	10 km	MPC · JPL
115171	2003 SS_{81}	—	September 19, 2003	Haleakala	NEAT	·	2.4 km	MPC · JPL
115172	2003 SN_{82}	—	September 18, 2003	Socorro	LINEAR	·	1.1 km	MPC · JPL
115173	2003 SW_{83}	—	September 18, 2003	Palomar	NEAT	·	1.9 km	MPC · JPL
115174	2003 SA_{87}	—	September 17, 2003	Socorro	LINEAR	(5)	3.0 km	MPC · JPL
115175	2003 SG_{87}	—	September 17, 2003	Socorro	LINEAR	·	1.9 km	MPC · JPL
115176	2003 SN_{87}	—	September 17, 2003	Socorro	LINEAR	·	3.6 km	MPC · JPL
115177	2003 ST_{87}	—	September 17, 2003	Haleakala	NEAT	EOS	3.9 km	MPC · JPL
115178	2003 SO_{88}	—	September 18, 2003	Anderson Mesa	LONEOS	EOS	4.6 km	MPC · JPL
115179	2003 SX_{89}	—	September 18, 2003	Palomar	NEAT	·	3.3 km	MPC · JPL
115180	2003 SM_{90}	—	September 18, 2003	Socorro	LINEAR	·	5.0 km	MPC · JPL
115181	2003 SX_{91}	—	September 18, 2003	Palomar	NEAT	PAD	3.3 km	MPC · JPL
115182	2003 ST_{92}	—	September 18, 2003	Kitt Peak	Spacewatch	·	2.6 km	MPC · JPL
115183	2003 SO_{94}	—	September 19, 2003	Campo Imperatore	CINEOS	·	7.1 km	MPC · JPL
115184	2003 SO_{95}	—	September 19, 2003	Palomar	NEAT	V	1.3 km	MPC · JPL
115185	2003 SD_{97}	—	September 19, 2003	Socorro	LINEAR	·	4.0 km	MPC · JPL
115186	2003 SB_{98}	—	September 19, 2003	Socorro	LINEAR	MAS	1.3 km	MPC · JPL
115187	2003 SD_{103}	—	September 20, 2003	Socorro	LINEAR	·	1.2 km	MPC · JPL
115188	2003 SP_{103}	—	September 20, 2003	Socorro	LINEAR	·	3.8 km	MPC · JPL
115189	2003 SY_{103}	—	September 20, 2003	Socorro	LINEAR	·	1.3 km	MPC · JPL
115190	2003 SW_{105}	—	September 20, 2003	Palomar	NEAT	·	3.0 km	MPC · JPL
115191	2003 SZ_{105}	—	September 20, 2003	Haleakala	NEAT	·	4.6 km	MPC · JPL
115192	2003 SO_{106}	—	September 20, 2003	Farpoint	Farpoint	·	2.1 km	MPC · JPL
115193	2003 SA_{107}	—	September 20, 2003	Palomar	NEAT	·	3.6 km	MPC · JPL
115194	2003 SF_{107}	—	September 20, 2003	Palomar	NEAT	·	2.7 km	MPC · JPL
115195	2003 SJ_{108}	—	September 20, 2003	Palomar	NEAT	·	7.5 km	MPC · JPL
115196	2003 SB_{109}	—	September 20, 2003	Kitt Peak	Spacewatch	EMA	7.2 km	MPC · JPL
115197	2003 SH_{109}	—	September 20, 2003	Kitt Peak	Spacewatch	ADE	5.5 km	MPC · JPL
115198	2003 SQ_{110}	—	September 20, 2003	Palomar	NEAT	·	3.6 km	MPC · JPL
115199	2003 SR_{110}	—	September 20, 2003	Palomar	NEAT	H	890 m	MPC · JPL
115200	2003 SV_{110}	—	September 20, 2003	Palomar	NEAT	HNS	3.2 km	MPC · JPL

== 115201–115300 ==
back to top

Designation			Discovery			Properties		Ref
Permanent	Provisional	Named after	Date	Site	Discoverer(s)	Category	Diam.	Ref
115201	2003 SM_{111}	—	September 19, 2003	Palomar	NEAT	·	3.9 km	MPC · JPL
115202	2003 ST_{111}	—	September 18, 2003	Socorro	LINEAR	V	1.1 km	MPC · JPL
115203	2003 SJ_{116}	—	September 16, 2003	Socorro	LINEAR	EOS	4.9 km	MPC · JPL
115204	2003 SV_{116}	—	September 16, 2003	Palomar	NEAT	EUN	2.1 km	MPC · JPL
115205	2003 SZ_{117}	—	September 16, 2003	Palomar	NEAT	GEF	2.9 km	MPC · JPL
115206	2003 SD_{118}	—	September 16, 2003	Palomar	NEAT	PHO	1.9 km	MPC · JPL
115207	2003 SJ_{119}	—	September 17, 2003	Anderson Mesa	LONEOS	·	5.0 km	MPC · JPL
115208	2003 SM_{120}	—	September 17, 2003	Kitt Peak	Spacewatch	·	2.5 km	MPC · JPL
115209	2003 SL_{124}	—	September 18, 2003	Palomar	NEAT	·	3.4 km	MPC · JPL
115210 Mutvicens	2003 SY_{124}	Mutvicens	September 19, 2003	Majorca	OAM	EUN	3.3 km	MPC · JPL
115211	2003 SS_{125}	—	September 19, 2003	Socorro	LINEAR	VER	8.2 km	MPC · JPL
115212	2003 SW_{125}	—	September 19, 2003	Socorro	LINEAR	·	4.4 km	MPC · JPL
115213	2003 SR_{126}	—	September 19, 2003	Haleakala	NEAT	KOR	2.6 km	MPC · JPL
115214	2003 SH_{128}	—	September 20, 2003	Socorro	LINEAR	DOR	5.4 km	MPC · JPL
115215	2003 SX_{128}	—	September 20, 2003	Palomar	NEAT	NYS	1.4 km	MPC · JPL
115216	2003 SZ_{129}	—	September 20, 2003	Socorro	LINEAR	H	1.3 km	MPC · JPL
115217	2003 SP_{138}	—	September 20, 2003	Palomar	NEAT	HYG	5.0 km	MPC · JPL
115218	2003 SF_{140}	—	September 19, 2003	Campo Imperatore	CINEOS	·	8.4 km	MPC · JPL
115219	2003 SJ_{140}	—	September 19, 2003	Socorro	LINEAR	V	1.1 km	MPC · JPL
115220	2003 ST_{140}	—	September 19, 2003	Palomar	NEAT	·	4.5 km	MPC · JPL
115221	2003 SH_{141}	—	September 19, 2003	Palomar	NEAT	·	3.9 km	MPC · JPL
115222	2003 SK_{142}	—	September 20, 2003	Palomar	NEAT	PHO	2.2 km	MPC · JPL
115223	2003 SM_{142}	—	September 20, 2003	Socorro	LINEAR	·	4.7 km	MPC · JPL
115224	2003 SR_{142}	—	September 20, 2003	Socorro	LINEAR	·	3.1 km	MPC · JPL
115225	2003 SW_{142}	—	September 20, 2003	Socorro	LINEAR	GEF	3.3 km	MPC · JPL
115226	2003 SA_{143}	—	September 20, 2003	Socorro	LINEAR	·	7.6 km	MPC · JPL
115227	2003 SB_{143}	—	September 20, 2003	Socorro	LINEAR	·	1.5 km	MPC · JPL
115228	2003 SL_{143}	—	September 20, 2003	Palomar	NEAT	·	2.0 km	MPC · JPL
115229	2003 SS_{143}	—	September 21, 2003	Socorro	LINEAR	AGN	2.8 km	MPC · JPL
115230	2003 ST_{143}	—	September 21, 2003	Socorro	LINEAR	HYG	5.4 km	MPC · JPL
115231	2003 SV_{143}	—	September 21, 2003	Socorro	LINEAR	HYG	8.0 km	MPC · JPL
115232	2003 SE_{145}	—	September 19, 2003	Palomar	NEAT	TIR	3.4 km	MPC · JPL
115233	2003 SH_{145}	—	September 20, 2003	Campo Imperatore	CINEOS	AGN	2.8 km	MPC · JPL
115234	2003 SV_{145}	—	September 20, 2003	Palomar	NEAT	·	3.7 km	MPC · JPL
115235	2003 SA_{146}	—	September 20, 2003	Palomar	NEAT	·	7.6 km	MPC · JPL
115236	2003 SS_{146}	—	September 20, 2003	Palomar	NEAT	·	3.1 km	MPC · JPL
115237	2003 SG_{147}	—	September 20, 2003	Palomar	NEAT	·	1.9 km	MPC · JPL
115238	2003 SQ_{147}	—	September 21, 2003	Kitt Peak	Spacewatch	·	2.1 km	MPC · JPL
115239	2003 SS_{147}	—	September 21, 2003	Kitt Peak	Spacewatch	·	2.5 km	MPC · JPL
115240	2003 SC_{148}	—	September 16, 2003	Socorro	LINEAR	·	3.3 km	MPC · JPL
115241	2003 SZ_{149}	—	September 17, 2003	Socorro	LINEAR	·	2.4 km	MPC · JPL
115242	2003 SX_{151}	—	September 18, 2003	Kitt Peak	Spacewatch	·	1.6 km	MPC · JPL
115243	2003 SC_{152}	—	September 19, 2003	Anderson Mesa	LONEOS	·	5.9 km	MPC · JPL
115244	2003 SL_{152}	—	September 19, 2003	Anderson Mesa	LONEOS	·	4.8 km	MPC · JPL
115245	2003 SO_{152}	—	September 19, 2003	Anderson Mesa	LONEOS	·	3.9 km	MPC · JPL
115246	2003 SF_{153}	—	September 19, 2003	Anderson Mesa	LONEOS	·	4.1 km	MPC · JPL
115247	2003 SS_{155}	—	September 19, 2003	Anderson Mesa	LONEOS	MAS	970 m	MPC · JPL
115248	2003 ST_{155}	—	September 19, 2003	Anderson Mesa	LONEOS	MAS	1.4 km	MPC · JPL
115249	2003 SE_{156}	—	September 19, 2003	Anderson Mesa	LONEOS	·	3.1 km	MPC · JPL
115250	2003 SF_{156}	—	September 19, 2003	Anderson Mesa	LONEOS	·	1.3 km	MPC · JPL
115251	2003 SS_{156}	—	September 19, 2003	Anderson Mesa	LONEOS	KOR	3.0 km	MPC · JPL
115252	2003 SK_{157}	—	September 19, 2003	Anderson Mesa	LONEOS	EOS	4.3 km	MPC · JPL
115253	2003 SN_{157}	—	September 19, 2003	Anderson Mesa	LONEOS	AGN	3.1 km	MPC · JPL
115254 Fényi	2003 SF_{158}	Fényi	September 22, 2003	Piszkéstető	K. Sárneczky, B. Sipőcz	·	3.4 km	MPC · JPL
115255	2003 SU_{160}	—	September 16, 2003	Kitt Peak	Spacewatch	·	2.9 km	MPC · JPL
115256	2003 SJ_{162}	—	September 19, 2003	Socorro	LINEAR	·	5.9 km	MPC · JPL
115257	2003 SO_{163}	—	September 19, 2003	Kitt Peak	Spacewatch	LIX	7.1 km	MPC · JPL
115258	2003 SD_{164}	—	September 20, 2003	Anderson Mesa	LONEOS	·	1.5 km	MPC · JPL
115259	2003 SK_{164}	—	September 20, 2003	Anderson Mesa	LONEOS	AGN	2.2 km	MPC · JPL
115260	2003 ST_{167}	—	September 22, 2003	Haleakala	NEAT	·	3.3 km	MPC · JPL
115261	2003 SE_{169}	—	September 23, 2003	Haleakala	NEAT	EUN	3.8 km	MPC · JPL
115262	2003 SB_{172}	—	September 18, 2003	Socorro	LINEAR	·	6.3 km	MPC · JPL
115263	2003 SN_{172}	—	September 18, 2003	Socorro	LINEAR	·	1.8 km	MPC · JPL
115264	2003 SW_{172}	—	September 18, 2003	Socorro	LINEAR	·	1.4 km	MPC · JPL
115265	2003 SC_{173}	—	September 18, 2003	Socorro	LINEAR	·	2.2 km	MPC · JPL
115266	2003 SG_{173}	—	September 18, 2003	Socorro	LINEAR	·	4.4 km	MPC · JPL
115267	2003 SE_{174}	—	September 18, 2003	Palomar	NEAT	·	1.8 km	MPC · JPL
115268	2003 SG_{177}	—	September 18, 2003	Palomar	NEAT	·	4.3 km	MPC · JPL
115269	2003 SP_{177}	—	September 18, 2003	Palomar	NEAT	·	1.5 km	MPC · JPL
115270	2003 SR_{179}	—	September 19, 2003	Socorro	LINEAR	PHO	4.0 km	MPC · JPL
115271	2003 SL_{180}	—	September 19, 2003	Kitt Peak	Spacewatch	RAF	3.0 km	MPC · JPL
115272	2003 SU_{181}	—	September 20, 2003	Anderson Mesa	LONEOS	·	2.1 km	MPC · JPL
115273	2003 SA_{182}	—	September 20, 2003	Socorro	LINEAR	GEF	2.8 km	MPC · JPL
115274	2003 SB_{182}	—	September 20, 2003	Socorro	LINEAR	·	2.0 km	MPC · JPL
115275	2003 SY_{182}	—	September 21, 2003	Pla D'Arguines	D'Arguines, Pla	·	6.9 km	MPC · JPL
115276	2003 SY_{183}	—	September 21, 2003	Kitt Peak	Spacewatch	·	2.0 km	MPC · JPL
115277	2003 SS_{185}	—	September 22, 2003	Anderson Mesa	LONEOS	·	2.3 km	MPC · JPL
115278	2003 SN_{186}	—	September 22, 2003	Anderson Mesa	LONEOS	·	2.8 km	MPC · JPL
115279	2003 SL_{188}	—	September 22, 2003	Anderson Mesa	LONEOS	·	1.8 km	MPC · JPL
115280	2003 SM_{188}	—	September 22, 2003	Anderson Mesa	LONEOS	·	1.5 km	MPC · JPL
115281	2003 SK_{189}	—	September 22, 2003	Palomar	NEAT	HYG	5.4 km	MPC · JPL
115282	2003 SD_{190}	—	September 24, 2003	Palomar	NEAT	EOS	3.3 km	MPC · JPL
115283	2003 SV_{190}	—	September 17, 2003	Kitt Peak	Spacewatch	·	2.4 km	MPC · JPL
115284	2003 SO_{192}	—	September 20, 2003	Socorro	LINEAR	(5651)	7.7 km	MPC · JPL
115285	2003 SB_{194}	—	September 20, 2003	Haleakala	NEAT	EOS	4.0 km	MPC · JPL
115286	2003 ST_{194}	—	September 20, 2003	Haleakala	NEAT	·	7.5 km	MPC · JPL
115287	2003 SU_{194}	—	September 20, 2003	Palomar	NEAT	·	5.7 km	MPC · JPL
115288	2003 SS_{195}	—	September 20, 2003	Kitt Peak	Spacewatch	·	1.3 km	MPC · JPL
115289	2003 ST_{195}	—	September 20, 2003	Kitt Peak	Spacewatch	·	4.0 km	MPC · JPL
115290	2003 SJ_{197}	—	September 21, 2003	Anderson Mesa	LONEOS	·	2.1 km	MPC · JPL
115291	2003 SA_{198}	—	September 21, 2003	Anderson Mesa	LONEOS	·	3.5 km	MPC · JPL
115292	2003 SM_{198}	—	September 21, 2003	Anderson Mesa	LONEOS	·	7.8 km	MPC · JPL
115293	2003 SV_{198}	—	September 21, 2003	Anderson Mesa	LONEOS	·	2.3 km	MPC · JPL
115294	2003 SB_{199}	—	September 21, 2003	Anderson Mesa	LONEOS	·	8.2 km	MPC · JPL
115295	2003 SB_{200}	—	September 21, 2003	Anderson Mesa	LONEOS	·	3.3 km	MPC · JPL
115296	2003 SK_{200}	—	September 25, 2003	Palomar	NEAT	·	3.1 km	MPC · JPL
115297	2003 SQ_{200}	—	September 24, 2003	Socorro	LINEAR	·	7.4 km	MPC · JPL
115298	2003 SS_{203}	—	September 22, 2003	Palomar	NEAT	·	3.2 km	MPC · JPL
115299	2003 SM_{204}	—	September 22, 2003	Socorro	LINEAR	·	9.9 km	MPC · JPL
115300	2003 SW_{204}	—	September 22, 2003	Socorro	LINEAR	EUN	2.7 km	MPC · JPL

== 115301–115400 ==
back to top

Designation			Discovery			Properties		Ref
Permanent	Provisional	Named after	Date	Site	Discoverer(s)	Category	Diam.	Ref
115301	2003 SQ_{205}	—	September 25, 2003	Haleakala	NEAT	·	2.9 km	MPC · JPL
115302	2003 SU_{206}	—	September 26, 2003	Socorro	LINEAR	·	2.2 km	MPC · JPL
115303	2003 SM_{207}	—	September 26, 2003	Socorro	LINEAR	·	2.5 km	MPC · JPL
115304	2003 SW_{207}	—	September 26, 2003	Socorro	LINEAR	·	1.4 km	MPC · JPL
115305	2003 SR_{209}	—	September 24, 2003	Kvistaberg	Uppsala-DLR Asteroid Survey	·	2.0 km	MPC · JPL
115306	2003 SN_{210}	—	September 26, 2003	Socorro	LINEAR	·	7.8 km	MPC · JPL
115307	2003 SO_{210}	—	September 26, 2003	Socorro	LINEAR	·	3.2 km	MPC · JPL
115308	2003 SC_{211}	—	September 24, 2003	Palomar	NEAT	·	1.4 km	MPC · JPL
115309	2003 SN_{211}	—	September 25, 2003	Palomar	NEAT	EOS	4.3 km	MPC · JPL
115310	2003 SR_{213}	—	September 26, 2003	Socorro	LINEAR	KOR	2.8 km	MPC · JPL
115311	2003 SH_{214}	—	September 26, 2003	Desert Eagle	W. K. Y. Yeung	KOR	2.4 km	MPC · JPL
115312 Whither	2003 SP_{215}	Whither	September 19, 2003	Wrightwood	J. W. Young	CLA	3.4 km	MPC · JPL
115313	2003 SX_{215}	—	September 25, 2003	Haleakala	NEAT	·	6.4 km	MPC · JPL
115314	2003 SY_{215}	—	September 25, 2003	Haleakala	NEAT	THM	5.3 km	MPC · JPL
115315	2003 SZ_{215}	—	September 25, 2003	Haleakala	NEAT	T_{j} (2.99) · 3:2	10 km	MPC · JPL
115316	2003 SK_{216}	—	September 26, 2003	Socorro	LINEAR	·	4.9 km	MPC · JPL
115317	2003 SZ_{216}	—	September 27, 2003	Desert Eagle	W. K. Y. Yeung	KOR	3.1 km	MPC · JPL
115318	2003 SJ_{217}	—	September 27, 2003	Desert Eagle	W. K. Y. Yeung	HOF	4.9 km	MPC · JPL
115319	2003 SR_{218}	—	September 28, 2003	Desert Eagle	W. K. Y. Yeung	NYS	2.5 km	MPC · JPL
115320	2003 SB_{219}	—	September 19, 2003	Palomar	NEAT	·	3.0 km	MPC · JPL
115321	2003 SK_{219}	—	September 28, 2003	Socorro	LINEAR	·	9.6 km	MPC · JPL
115322	2003 SM_{219}	—	September 26, 2003	Socorro	LINEAR	·	2.0 km	MPC · JPL
115323	2003 SO_{219}	—	September 27, 2003	Desert Eagle	W. K. Y. Yeung	·	1.6 km	MPC · JPL
115324	2003 SP_{220}	—	September 29, 2003	Desert Eagle	W. K. Y. Yeung	GEF	3.0 km	MPC · JPL
115325	2003 SQ_{220}	—	September 29, 2003	Desert Eagle	W. K. Y. Yeung	SYL · CYB	8.3 km	MPC · JPL
115326 Wehinger	2003 SC_{221}	Wehinger	September 29, 2003	Junk Bond	D. Healy	·	4.2 km	MPC · JPL
115327	2003 SH_{222}	—	September 27, 2003	Desert Eagle	W. K. Y. Yeung	·	3.1 km	MPC · JPL
115328	2003 SR_{222}	—	September 28, 2003	Fountain Hills	C. W. Juels, P. R. Holvorcem	·	6.7 km	MPC · JPL
115329	2003 SY_{222}	—	September 27, 2003	Desert Eagle	W. K. Y. Yeung	EOS	3.2 km	MPC · JPL
115330	2003 SB_{224}	—	September 22, 2003	Socorro	LINEAR	·	1.5 km	MPC · JPL
115331 Shrylmiles	2003 SL_{224}	Shrylmiles	September 29, 2003	Junk Bond	D. Healy	·	3.8 km	MPC · JPL
115332	2003 SR_{224}	—	September 28, 2003	Anderson Mesa	LONEOS	·	3.2 km	MPC · JPL
115333	2003 SV_{225}	—	September 26, 2003	Socorro	LINEAR	·	1.0 km	MPC · JPL
115334	2003 SX_{225}	—	September 26, 2003	Socorro	LINEAR	KOR	2.7 km	MPC · JPL
115335	2003 SZ_{225}	—	September 26, 2003	Socorro	LINEAR	·	3.5 km	MPC · JPL
115336	2003 SF_{226}	—	September 26, 2003	Socorro	LINEAR	·	2.3 km	MPC · JPL
115337	2003 SG_{226}	—	September 26, 2003	Socorro	LINEAR	·	3.8 km	MPC · JPL
115338	2003 SH_{226}	—	September 26, 2003	Socorro	LINEAR	PAD	3.6 km	MPC · JPL
115339	2003 SK_{226}	—	September 26, 2003	Socorro	LINEAR	·	1.4 km	MPC · JPL
115340	2003 SL_{226}	—	September 26, 2003	Socorro	LINEAR	3:2	5.2 km	MPC · JPL
115341	2003 SS_{226}	—	September 26, 2003	Socorro	LINEAR	·	3.6 km	MPC · JPL
115342	2003 SO_{227}	—	September 27, 2003	Socorro	LINEAR	·	3.0 km	MPC · JPL
115343	2003 SS_{228}	—	September 26, 2003	Socorro	LINEAR	·	3.1 km	MPC · JPL
115344	2003 SV_{228}	—	September 26, 2003	Socorro	LINEAR	(2076)	1.5 km	MPC · JPL
115345	2003 SB_{229}	—	September 27, 2003	Kitt Peak	Spacewatch	MAS	1.3 km	MPC · JPL
115346	2003 SY_{230}	—	September 24, 2003	Palomar	NEAT	·	2.2 km	MPC · JPL
115347	2003 SS_{232}	—	September 24, 2003	Haleakala	NEAT	·	4.7 km	MPC · JPL
115348	2003 SW_{233}	—	September 25, 2003	Haleakala	NEAT	TIR	3.5 km	MPC · JPL
115349	2003 SR_{234}	—	September 25, 2003	Haleakala	NEAT	·	6.3 km	MPC · JPL
115350	2003 SW_{234}	—	September 25, 2003	Črni Vrh	Mikuž, H.	·	4.1 km	MPC · JPL
115351	2003 SA_{235}	—	September 26, 2003	Socorro	LINEAR	·	1.5 km	MPC · JPL
115352	2003 SX_{240}	—	September 27, 2003	Socorro	LINEAR	·	4.7 km	MPC · JPL
115353	2003 SJ_{244}	—	September 25, 2003	Haleakala	NEAT	·	9.2 km	MPC · JPL
115354	2003 SW_{244}	—	September 26, 2003	Socorro	LINEAR	·	2.0 km	MPC · JPL
115355	2003 SQ_{246}	—	September 26, 2003	Socorro	LINEAR	THM	5.3 km	MPC · JPL
115356	2003 SD_{247}	—	September 26, 2003	Socorro	LINEAR	·	3.3 km	MPC · JPL
115357	2003 SS_{249}	—	September 26, 2003	Socorro	LINEAR	NYS	1.5 km	MPC · JPL
115358	2003 SY_{249}	—	September 26, 2003	Socorro	LINEAR	·	2.4 km	MPC · JPL
115359	2003 SA_{250}	—	September 26, 2003	Socorro	LINEAR	·	4.6 km	MPC · JPL
115360	2003 SJ_{250}	—	September 26, 2003	Socorro	LINEAR	EOS ·	9.3 km	MPC · JPL
115361	2003 SL_{250}	—	September 26, 2003	Socorro	LINEAR	·	1.6 km	MPC · JPL
115362	2003 SN_{250}	—	September 26, 2003	Socorro	LINEAR	·	1.5 km	MPC · JPL
115363	2003 SZ_{250}	—	September 26, 2003	Socorro	LINEAR	·	2.3 km	MPC · JPL
115364	2003 SC_{251}	—	September 26, 2003	Socorro	LINEAR	·	3.6 km	MPC · JPL
115365	2003 SE_{251}	—	September 26, 2003	Socorro	LINEAR	·	1.4 km	MPC · JPL
115366	2003 SL_{251}	—	September 26, 2003	Socorro	LINEAR	·	5.6 km	MPC · JPL
115367	2003 SP_{251}	—	September 26, 2003	Socorro	LINEAR	·	1.4 km	MPC · JPL
115368	2003 SZ_{251}	—	September 26, 2003	Socorro	LINEAR	·	3.7 km	MPC · JPL
115369	2003 SS_{252}	—	September 26, 2003	Socorro	LINEAR	·	6.8 km	MPC · JPL
115370	2003 SX_{254}	—	September 27, 2003	Kitt Peak	Spacewatch	(5)	2.2 km	MPC · JPL
115371	2003 SU_{255}	—	September 27, 2003	Kitt Peak	Spacewatch	·	4.6 km	MPC · JPL
115372	2003 SA_{256}	—	September 27, 2003	Kitt Peak	Spacewatch	MAS	1.3 km	MPC · JPL
115373	2003 SA_{259}	—	September 28, 2003	Kitt Peak	Spacewatch	KOR	2.3 km	MPC · JPL
115374	2003 SC_{259}	—	September 28, 2003	Kitt Peak	Spacewatch	·	1.7 km	MPC · JPL
115375	2003 SG_{259}	—	September 28, 2003	Kitt Peak	Spacewatch	KOR	2.4 km	MPC · JPL
115376	2003 SH_{262}	—	September 27, 2003	Kitt Peak	Spacewatch	·	1.2 km	MPC · JPL
115377	2003 SA_{270}	—	September 24, 2003	Haleakala	NEAT	EOS	4.5 km	MPC · JPL
115378	2003 SO_{270}	—	September 25, 2003	Palomar	NEAT	EUN	2.6 km	MPC · JPL
115379	2003 SE_{271}	—	September 25, 2003	Haleakala	NEAT	·	3.7 km	MPC · JPL
115380	2003 SJ_{271}	—	September 25, 2003	Haleakala	NEAT	HIL · 3:2	9.8 km	MPC · JPL
115381	2003 SV_{272}	—	September 27, 2003	Socorro	LINEAR	·	2.2 km	MPC · JPL
115382	2003 SD_{273}	—	September 27, 2003	Socorro	LINEAR	EOS	4.0 km	MPC · JPL
115383	2003 SF_{274}	—	September 28, 2003	Anderson Mesa	LONEOS	PHO	1.7 km	MPC · JPL
115384	2003 SG_{275}	—	September 29, 2003	Socorro	LINEAR	NYS	2.1 km	MPC · JPL
115385	2003 SH_{275}	—	September 29, 2003	Socorro	LINEAR	HYG	5.3 km	MPC · JPL
115386	2003 SP_{275}	—	September 29, 2003	Socorro	LINEAR	·	1.2 km	MPC · JPL
115387	2003 SY_{275}	—	September 29, 2003	Socorro	LINEAR	·	3.4 km	MPC · JPL
115388	2003 SN_{278}	—	September 30, 2003	Socorro	LINEAR	·	1.6 km	MPC · JPL
115389	2003 SU_{278}	—	September 30, 2003	Socorro	LINEAR	·	3.4 km	MPC · JPL
115390	2003 SR_{279}	—	September 17, 2003	Socorro	LINEAR	·	3.4 km	MPC · JPL
115391	2003 SG_{280}	—	September 18, 2003	Socorro	LINEAR	·	2.5 km	MPC · JPL
115392	2003 SM_{283}	—	September 20, 2003	Socorro	LINEAR	·	8.0 km	MPC · JPL
115393	2003 SW_{284}	—	September 20, 2003	Socorro	LINEAR	·	2.3 km	MPC · JPL
115394	2003 SA_{286}	—	September 20, 2003	Palomar	NEAT	slow	4.9 km	MPC · JPL
115395	2003 SR_{286}	—	September 21, 2003	Palomar	NEAT	·	3.8 km	MPC · JPL
115396	2003 SA_{287}	—	September 29, 2003	Kitt Peak	Spacewatch	·	5.6 km	MPC · JPL
115397	2003 SN_{288}	—	September 28, 2003	Socorro	LINEAR	·	1.3 km	MPC · JPL
115398	2003 SF_{290}	—	September 28, 2003	Anderson Mesa	LONEOS	(5)	2.8 km	MPC · JPL
115399	2003 SD_{291}	—	September 29, 2003	Socorro	LINEAR	KOR	2.9 km	MPC · JPL
115400	2003 SJ_{291}	—	September 29, 2003	Socorro	LINEAR	KOR	2.9 km	MPC · JPL

== 115401–115500 ==
back to top

Designation			Discovery			Properties		Ref
Permanent	Provisional	Named after	Date	Site	Discoverer(s)	Category	Diam.	Ref
115401	2003 SK_{291}	—	September 29, 2003	Socorro	LINEAR	·	1.5 km	MPC · JPL
115402	2003 SR_{291}	—	September 30, 2003	Socorro	LINEAR	·	2.4 km	MPC · JPL
115403	2003 SA_{292}	—	September 30, 2003	Socorro	LINEAR	·	2.3 km	MPC · JPL
115404	2003 SA_{293}	—	September 27, 2003	Socorro	LINEAR	(5)	2.3 km	MPC · JPL
115405	2003 SX_{293}	—	September 28, 2003	Socorro	LINEAR	·	3.8 km	MPC · JPL
115406	2003 SK_{294}	—	September 28, 2003	Socorro	LINEAR	·	1.5 km	MPC · JPL
115407	2003 ST_{294}	—	September 28, 2003	Socorro	LINEAR	·	1.5 km	MPC · JPL
115408	2003 SU_{294}	—	September 28, 2003	Socorro	LINEAR	·	5.9 km	MPC · JPL
115409	2003 SW_{294}	—	September 28, 2003	Socorro	LINEAR	NYS	2.3 km	MPC · JPL
115410	2003 SN_{296}	—	September 29, 2003	Anderson Mesa	LONEOS	·	2.4 km	MPC · JPL
115411	2003 SB_{297}	—	September 16, 2003	Palomar	NEAT	·	4.0 km	MPC · JPL
115412	2003 SN_{297}	—	September 18, 2003	Haleakala	NEAT	·	3.1 km	MPC · JPL
115413	2003 SA_{299}	—	September 29, 2003	Anderson Mesa	LONEOS	·	6.4 km	MPC · JPL
115414	2003 SG_{299}	—	September 29, 2003	Anderson Mesa	LONEOS	PHO	4.0 km	MPC · JPL
115415	2003 SJ_{299}	—	September 29, 2003	Anderson Mesa	LONEOS	·	3.8 km	MPC · JPL
115416	2003 SP_{299}	—	September 29, 2003	Socorro	LINEAR	·	8.3 km	MPC · JPL
115417	2003 SR_{299}	—	September 30, 2003	Socorro	LINEAR	PHO	3.2 km	MPC · JPL
115418	2003 SY_{301}	—	September 17, 2003	Palomar	NEAT	·	2.4 km	MPC · JPL
115419	2003 SG_{305}	—	September 17, 2003	Palomar	NEAT	·	2.9 km	MPC · JPL
115420	2003 SJ_{306}	—	September 30, 2003	Socorro	LINEAR	526	4.2 km	MPC · JPL
115421	2003 SN_{306}	—	September 30, 2003	Socorro	LINEAR	·	2.0 km	MPC · JPL
115422	2003 SM_{307}	—	September 26, 2003	Socorro	LINEAR	·	6.4 km	MPC · JPL
115423	2003 SG_{308}	—	September 28, 2003	Socorro	LINEAR	HNS	2.7 km	MPC · JPL
115424	2003 SE_{310}	—	September 28, 2003	Socorro	LINEAR	NYS	2.3 km	MPC · JPL
115425	2003 SH_{310}	—	September 28, 2003	Socorro	LINEAR	·	7.3 km	MPC · JPL
115426	2003 SP_{311}	—	September 29, 2003	Socorro	LINEAR	·	3.1 km	MPC · JPL
115427	2003 SG_{312}	—	September 30, 2003	Kitt Peak	Spacewatch	PHO	2.5 km	MPC · JPL
115428	2003 SH_{313}	—	September 18, 2003	Goodricke-Pigott	R. A. Tucker	·	2.8 km	MPC · JPL
115429	2003 SB_{315}	—	September 17, 2003	Socorro	LINEAR	TIR	5.7 km	MPC · JPL
115430	2003 SF_{315}	—	September 26, 2003	Palomar	NEAT	HNS	2.2 km	MPC · JPL
115431	2003 TJ_{1}	—	October 4, 2003	Kingsnake	J. V. McClusky	MAR	2.2 km	MPC · JPL
115432	2003 TQ_{2}	—	October 1, 2003	Goodricke-Pigott	Kessel, J. W.	·	4.4 km	MPC · JPL
115433	2003 TS_{2}	—	October 2, 2003	Goodricke-Pigott	Kessel, J. W.	·	5.8 km	MPC · JPL
115434 Kellyfast	2003 TU_{2}	Kellyfast	October 5, 2003	Goodricke-Pigott	Reddy, V.	NEM ·	2.9 km	MPC · JPL
115435	2003 TM_{4}	—	October 6, 2003	Anderson Mesa	LONEOS	PHO	4.5 km	MPC · JPL
115436	2003 TU_{4}	—	October 1, 2003	Kitt Peak	Spacewatch	·	4.5 km	MPC · JPL
115437	2003 TG_{5}	—	October 2, 2003	Kitt Peak	Spacewatch	NYS ·	3.4 km	MPC · JPL
115438	2003 TE_{6}	—	October 1, 2003	Anderson Mesa	LONEOS	V	1.2 km	MPC · JPL
115439	2003 TN_{6}	—	October 1, 2003	Anderson Mesa	LONEOS	·	4.2 km	MPC · JPL
115440	2003 TV_{6}	—	October 1, 2003	Anderson Mesa	LONEOS	T_{j} (2.98) · 3:2	16 km	MPC · JPL
115441	2003 TO_{7}	—	October 1, 2003	Anderson Mesa	LONEOS	·	8.1 km	MPC · JPL
115442	2003 TS_{7}	—	October 1, 2003	Anderson Mesa	LONEOS	·	3.3 km	MPC · JPL
115443	2003 TK_{8}	—	October 2, 2003	Socorro	LINEAR	·	5.2 km	MPC · JPL
115444	2003 TU_{8}	—	October 3, 2003	Kitt Peak	Spacewatch	·	3.0 km	MPC · JPL
115445	2003 TF_{9}	—	October 4, 2003	Kitt Peak	Spacewatch	·	4.7 km	MPC · JPL
115446	2003 TK_{9}	—	October 5, 2003	Haleakala	NEAT	·	1.3 km	MPC · JPL
115447	2003 TM_{9}	—	October 5, 2003	Haleakala	NEAT	NYS	2.0 km	MPC · JPL
115448	2003 TU_{9}	—	October 14, 2003	Palomar	NEAT	·	5.3 km	MPC · JPL
115449 Robson	2003 TG_{10}	Robson	October 14, 2003	New Milford	John J. McCarthy Observatory	NEM	4.3 km	MPC · JPL
115450	2003 TK_{10}	—	October 15, 2003	Črni Vrh	Skvarč, J.	·	3.0 km	MPC · JPL
115451	2003 TZ_{10}	—	October 15, 2003	Palomar	NEAT	·	4.7 km	MPC · JPL
115452	2003 TB_{11}	—	October 14, 2003	Anderson Mesa	LONEOS	·	6.1 km	MPC · JPL
115453	2003 TL_{11}	—	October 14, 2003	Anderson Mesa	LONEOS	HOF · slow	5.5 km	MPC · JPL
115454	2003 TF_{12}	—	October 14, 2003	Anderson Mesa	LONEOS	·	3.6 km	MPC · JPL
115455	2003 TL_{12}	—	October 14, 2003	Socorro	LINEAR	·	10 km	MPC · JPL
115456	2003 TD_{13}	—	October 9, 2003	Anderson Mesa	LONEOS	·	2.7 km	MPC · JPL
115457	2003 TU_{13}	—	October 5, 2003	Socorro	LINEAR	H	1.1 km	MPC · JPL
115458	2003 TN_{14}	—	October 14, 2003	Anderson Mesa	LONEOS	·	6.0 km	MPC · JPL
115459	2003 TG_{15}	—	October 15, 2003	Anderson Mesa	LONEOS	·	2.3 km	MPC · JPL
115460	2003 TL_{15}	—	October 15, 2003	Anderson Mesa	LONEOS	MRX	2.6 km	MPC · JPL
115461	2003 TO_{15}	—	October 15, 2003	Anderson Mesa	LONEOS	·	7.4 km	MPC · JPL
115462	2003 TZ_{15}	—	October 15, 2003	Anderson Mesa	LONEOS	·	2.5 km	MPC · JPL
115463	2003 TF_{16}	—	October 15, 2003	Anderson Mesa	LONEOS	3:2	10 km	MPC · JPL
115464	2003 TO_{16}	—	October 15, 2003	Anderson Mesa	LONEOS	·	3.3 km	MPC · JPL
115465	2003 TM_{17}	—	October 15, 2003	Palomar	NEAT	·	2.2 km	MPC · JPL
115466	2003 TM_{19}	—	October 15, 2003	Palomar	NEAT	·	2.4 km	MPC · JPL
115467	2003 TW_{19}	—	October 15, 2003	Anderson Mesa	LONEOS	·	5.6 km	MPC · JPL
115468	2003 TX_{20}	—	October 15, 2003	Anderson Mesa	LONEOS	·	6.7 km	MPC · JPL
115469	2003 TZ_{31}	—	October 1, 2003	Kitt Peak	Spacewatch	·	1.3 km	MPC · JPL
115470	2003 TE_{57}	—	October 5, 2003	Socorro	LINEAR	·	3.6 km	MPC · JPL
115471	2003 UA_{1}	—	October 16, 2003	Palomar	NEAT	HYG	4.8 km	MPC · JPL
115472	2003 UD_{3}	—	October 16, 2003	Kitt Peak	Spacewatch	·	3.2 km	MPC · JPL
115473	2003 UP_{3}	—	October 17, 2003	Socorro	LINEAR	H	1.1 km	MPC · JPL
115474	2003 UE_{4}	—	October 16, 2003	Palomar	NEAT	·	8.1 km	MPC · JPL
115475	2003 UV_{4}	—	October 17, 2003	Socorro	LINEAR	HNS	2.3 km	MPC · JPL
115476	2003 UF_{7}	—	October 18, 2003	Socorro	LINEAR	H	1.0 km	MPC · JPL
115477 Brantanica	2003 UK_{8}	Brantanica	October 19, 2003	Wrightwood	J. W. Young	·	3.5 km	MPC · JPL
115478	2003 UT_{8}	—	October 16, 2003	Socorro	LINEAR	H	1.1 km	MPC · JPL
115479	2003 UP_{10}	—	October 19, 2003	Anderson Mesa	LONEOS	TIR ·	6.6 km	MPC · JPL
115480	2003 UC_{11}	—	October 19, 2003	Kvistaberg	Uppsala-DLR Asteroid Survey	·	3.0 km	MPC · JPL
115481	2003 UG_{12}	—	October 20, 2003	Palomar	NEAT	·	1.2 km	MPC · JPL
115482	2003 UV_{14}	—	October 16, 2003	Kitt Peak	Spacewatch	·	4.5 km	MPC · JPL
115483	2003 UJ_{16}	—	October 16, 2003	Anderson Mesa	LONEOS	·	4.8 km	MPC · JPL
115484	2003 UL_{19}	—	October 20, 2003	Palomar	NEAT	·	4.1 km	MPC · JPL
115485	2003 UR_{19}	—	October 22, 2003	Wrightwood	J. W. Young	·	2.1 km	MPC · JPL
115486	2003 UN_{20}	—	October 21, 2003	Socorro	LINEAR	·	1.2 km	MPC · JPL
115487	2003 UK_{21}	—	October 18, 2003	Anderson Mesa	LONEOS	·	4.1 km	MPC · JPL
115488	2003 UL_{21}	—	October 18, 2003	Palomar	NEAT	·	9.2 km	MPC · JPL
115489	2003 UO_{21}	—	October 18, 2003	Kitt Peak	Spacewatch	V	1.4 km	MPC · JPL
115490	2003 UQ_{21}	—	October 20, 2003	Kingsnake	J. V. McClusky	·	1.7 km	MPC · JPL
115491	2003 UT_{21}	—	October 21, 2003	Kingsnake	J. V. McClusky	·	7.3 km	MPC · JPL
115492 Watonga	2003 UR_{22}	Watonga	October 23, 2003	Emerald Lane	L. Ball	·	6.3 km	MPC · JPL
115493	2003 UP_{23}	—	October 22, 2003	Kitt Peak	Spacewatch	·	1.8 km	MPC · JPL
115494	2003 UW_{24}	—	October 17, 2003	Anderson Mesa	LONEOS	·	5.6 km	MPC · JPL
115495	2003 UD_{25}	—	October 21, 2003	Socorro	LINEAR	·	2.8 km	MPC · JPL
115496	2003 UF_{26}	—	October 24, 2003	Socorro	LINEAR	·	5.8 km	MPC · JPL
115497	2003 UG_{26}	—	October 24, 2003	Socorro	LINEAR	·	4.7 km	MPC · JPL
115498	2003 UN_{26}	—	October 25, 2003	Goodricke-Pigott	R. A. Tucker	·	1.9 km	MPC · JPL
115499	2003 UO_{26}	—	October 25, 2003	Goodricke-Pigott	R. A. Tucker	(5)	1.7 km	MPC · JPL
115500	2003 UC_{27}	—	October 23, 2003	Goodricke-Pigott	R. A. Tucker	·	3.7 km	MPC · JPL

== 115501–115600 ==
back to top

Designation			Discovery			Properties		Ref
Permanent	Provisional	Named after	Date	Site	Discoverer(s)	Category	Diam.	Ref
115501	2003 UV_{27}	—	October 22, 2003	Goodricke-Pigott	R. A. Tucker	EOS	3.5 km	MPC · JPL
115502	2003 UX_{27}	—	October 22, 2003	Goodricke-Pigott	R. A. Tucker	·	4.7 km	MPC · JPL
115503	2003 UP_{28}	—	October 19, 2003	Kitt Peak	Spacewatch	·	1.8 km	MPC · JPL
115504	2003 UH_{29}	—	October 23, 2003	Kvistaberg	Uppsala-DLR Asteroid Survey	AST	4.4 km	MPC · JPL
115505	2003 UD_{32}	—	October 16, 2003	Kitt Peak	Spacewatch	MRX	2.0 km	MPC · JPL
115506	2003 UC_{35}	—	October 16, 2003	Anderson Mesa	LONEOS	·	5.1 km	MPC · JPL
115507	2003 UK_{35}	—	October 16, 2003	Palomar	NEAT	·	3.5 km	MPC · JPL
115508	2003 UU_{35}	—	October 16, 2003	Palomar	NEAT	·	6.7 km	MPC · JPL
115509	2003 UV_{35}	—	October 16, 2003	Palomar	NEAT	·	3.0 km	MPC · JPL
115510	2003 UX_{35}	—	October 16, 2003	Palomar	NEAT	·	4.0 km	MPC · JPL
115511	2003 UZ_{35}	—	October 16, 2003	Anderson Mesa	LONEOS	·	2.6 km	MPC · JPL
115512	2003 UB_{36}	—	October 16, 2003	Palomar	NEAT	·	8.8 km	MPC · JPL
115513	2003 UE_{36}	—	October 16, 2003	Palomar	NEAT	EOS	3.8 km	MPC · JPL
115514	2003 UL_{36}	—	October 16, 2003	Palomar	NEAT	·	2.7 km	MPC · JPL
115515	2003 UU_{36}	—	October 16, 2003	Palomar	NEAT	MAR	2.0 km	MPC · JPL
115516	2003 UF_{37}	—	October 16, 2003	Palomar	NEAT	EUN	2.7 km	MPC · JPL
115517	2003 UL_{37}	—	October 16, 2003	Črni Vrh	Mikuž, H.	·	4.8 km	MPC · JPL
115518	2003 UM_{37}	—	October 16, 2003	Črni Vrh	Mikuž, H.	EOS	3.7 km	MPC · JPL
115519	2003 UN_{37}	—	October 16, 2003	Črni Vrh	Mikuž, H.	·	4.2 km	MPC · JPL
115520	2003 UO_{37}	—	October 17, 2003	Črni Vrh	Mikuž, H.	·	3.2 km	MPC · JPL
115521	2003 UL_{38}	—	October 17, 2003	Kitt Peak	Spacewatch	V	1.5 km	MPC · JPL
115522	2003 UW_{39}	—	October 16, 2003	Kitt Peak	Spacewatch	NYS	1.9 km	MPC · JPL
115523	2003 UC_{41}	—	October 16, 2003	Anderson Mesa	LONEOS	·	2.8 km	MPC · JPL
115524	2003 UD_{47}	—	October 21, 2003	Goodricke-Pigott	R. A. Tucker	·	3.6 km	MPC · JPL
115525	2003 UF_{47}	—	October 16, 2003	Goodricke-Pigott	R. A. Tucker	·	2.4 km	MPC · JPL
115526	2003 UL_{47}	—	October 20, 2003	Goodricke-Pigott	R. A. Tucker	·	4.9 km	MPC · JPL
115527	2003 UF_{48}	—	October 16, 2003	Anderson Mesa	LONEOS	V	1.3 km	MPC · JPL
115528	2003 UZ_{48}	—	October 16, 2003	Anderson Mesa	LONEOS	·	3.7 km	MPC · JPL
115529	2003 UG_{49}	—	October 16, 2003	Anderson Mesa	LONEOS	·	3.1 km	MPC · JPL
115530	2003 UH_{49}	—	October 16, 2003	Anderson Mesa	LONEOS	·	3.6 km	MPC · JPL
115531	2003 UE_{52}	—	October 18, 2003	Palomar	NEAT	·	4.3 km	MPC · JPL
115532	2003 UP_{52}	—	October 18, 2003	Palomar	NEAT	·	5.3 km	MPC · JPL
115533	2003 UG_{53}	—	October 18, 2003	Palomar	NEAT	·	4.6 km	MPC · JPL
115534	2003 UZ_{53}	—	October 18, 2003	Palomar	NEAT	EOS	3.2 km	MPC · JPL
115535	2003 UW_{54}	—	October 18, 2003	Palomar	NEAT	·	7.6 km	MPC · JPL
115536	2003 UZ_{54}	—	October 18, 2003	Palomar	NEAT	EOS	5.1 km	MPC · JPL
115537	2003 UX_{56}	—	October 23, 2003	Kitt Peak	Spacewatch	·	3.9 km	MPC · JPL
115538	2003 UO_{58}	—	October 16, 2003	Kitt Peak	Spacewatch	·	5.5 km	MPC · JPL
115539	2003 UZ_{60}	—	October 16, 2003	Palomar	NEAT	·	1.7 km	MPC · JPL
115540	2003 UP_{61}	—	October 16, 2003	Anderson Mesa	LONEOS	·	4.7 km	MPC · JPL
115541	2003 UY_{62}	—	October 16, 2003	Palomar	NEAT	·	2.5 km	MPC · JPL
115542	2003 UZ_{63}	—	October 16, 2003	Anderson Mesa	LONEOS	·	5.1 km	MPC · JPL
115543	2003 UG_{64}	—	October 16, 2003	Anderson Mesa	LONEOS	·	4.7 km	MPC · JPL
115544	2003 UP_{64}	—	October 16, 2003	Anderson Mesa	LONEOS	EUN	2.1 km	MPC · JPL
115545	2003 UW_{64}	—	October 16, 2003	Anderson Mesa	LONEOS	·	2.4 km	MPC · JPL
115546	2003 UH_{65}	—	October 16, 2003	Palomar	NEAT	EOS	4.4 km	MPC · JPL
115547	2003 UV_{65}	—	October 16, 2003	Palomar	NEAT	EOS	4.3 km	MPC · JPL
115548	2003 UB_{66}	—	October 16, 2003	Palomar	NEAT	·	5.9 km	MPC · JPL
115549	2003 UE_{66}	—	October 16, 2003	Palomar	NEAT	·	8.3 km	MPC · JPL
115550	2003 UG_{66}	—	October 16, 2003	Palomar	NEAT	EOS	4.0 km	MPC · JPL
115551	2003 UB_{71}	—	October 18, 2003	Kitt Peak	Spacewatch	KOR	2.5 km	MPC · JPL
115552	2003 UE_{71}	—	October 18, 2003	Kitt Peak	Spacewatch	KOR	2.8 km	MPC · JPL
115553	2003 UB_{73}	—	October 19, 2003	Kitt Peak	Spacewatch	·	1.7 km	MPC · JPL
115554	2003 UL_{74}	—	October 16, 2003	Črni Vrh	Mikuž, H.	·	4.3 km	MPC · JPL
115555	2003 UQ_{75}	—	October 17, 2003	Kitt Peak	Spacewatch	·	6.8 km	MPC · JPL
115556	2003 UN_{77}	—	October 17, 2003	Anderson Mesa	LONEOS	·	1.6 km	MPC · JPL
115557	2003 UT_{77}	—	October 17, 2003	Kitt Peak	Spacewatch	TEL	2.7 km	MPC · JPL
115558	2003 UD_{78}	—	October 17, 2003	Anderson Mesa	LONEOS	·	5.8 km	MPC · JPL
115559	2003 UK_{78}	—	October 17, 2003	Anderson Mesa	LONEOS	·	5.3 km	MPC · JPL
115560	2003 UB_{79}	—	October 18, 2003	Haleakala	NEAT	·	1.9 km	MPC · JPL
115561 Frankherbert	2003 UF_{80}	Frankherbert	October 20, 2003	Needville	Dillon, W. G., Wells, D.	·	6.7 km	MPC · JPL
115562	2003 UR_{80}	—	October 16, 2003	Kitt Peak	Spacewatch	·	3.9 km	MPC · JPL
115563	2003 UU_{80}	—	October 16, 2003	Anderson Mesa	LONEOS	·	2.4 km	MPC · JPL
115564	2003 UC_{81}	—	October 16, 2003	Anderson Mesa	LONEOS	·	4.4 km	MPC · JPL
115565	2003 UL_{81}	—	October 16, 2003	Haleakala	NEAT	·	4.2 km	MPC · JPL
115566	2003 UB_{82}	—	October 18, 2003	Haleakala	NEAT	·	1.4 km	MPC · JPL
115567	2003 UY_{82}	—	October 19, 2003	Palomar	NEAT	·	1.6 km	MPC · JPL
115568	2003 UZ_{82}	—	October 19, 2003	Haleakala	NEAT	fast	4.7 km	MPC · JPL
115569	2003 UR_{84}	—	October 18, 2003	Kitt Peak	Spacewatch	·	2.4 km	MPC · JPL
115570	2003 UT_{84}	—	October 18, 2003	Kitt Peak	Spacewatch	V	950 m	MPC · JPL
115571	2003 UU_{85}	—	October 18, 2003	Haleakala	NEAT	·	6.6 km	MPC · JPL
115572	2003 UY_{85}	—	October 18, 2003	Palomar	NEAT	·	1.7 km	MPC · JPL
115573	2003 UE_{86}	—	October 18, 2003	Palomar	NEAT	WIT	1.9 km	MPC · JPL
115574	2003 UF_{86}	—	October 18, 2003	Palomar	NEAT	·	2.5 km	MPC · JPL
115575	2003 UK_{86}	—	October 18, 2003	Palomar	NEAT	EUN	3.5 km	MPC · JPL
115576	2003 UM_{88}	—	October 19, 2003	Anderson Mesa	LONEOS	·	4.3 km	MPC · JPL
115577	2003 UO_{88}	—	October 19, 2003	Anderson Mesa	LONEOS	·	3.8 km	MPC · JPL
115578	2003 UB_{89}	—	October 19, 2003	Anderson Mesa	LONEOS	HNS	1.9 km	MPC · JPL
115579	2003 UN_{90}	—	October 20, 2003	Socorro	LINEAR	WIT	2.2 km	MPC · JPL
115580	2003 UX_{90}	—	October 20, 2003	Socorro	LINEAR	NEM	4.4 km	MPC · JPL
115581	2003 UD_{91}	—	October 20, 2003	Socorro	LINEAR	·	1.5 km	MPC · JPL
115582	2003 UT_{92}	—	October 20, 2003	Palomar	NEAT	EOS	3.9 km	MPC · JPL
115583	2003 UM_{93}	—	October 17, 2003	Kitt Peak	Spacewatch	·	4.8 km	MPC · JPL
115584	2003 UE_{95}	—	October 18, 2003	Haleakala	NEAT	·	5.6 km	MPC · JPL
115585	2003 UT_{95}	—	October 18, 2003	Haleakala	NEAT	NYS	2.0 km	MPC · JPL
115586	2003 UF_{96}	—	October 18, 2003	Kitt Peak	Spacewatch	KOR	2.6 km	MPC · JPL
115587	2003 UY_{96}	—	October 19, 2003	Kitt Peak	Spacewatch	MAS	1.1 km	MPC · JPL
115588	2003 UZ_{96}	—	October 19, 2003	Kitt Peak	Spacewatch	·	2.1 km	MPC · JPL
115589	2003 UG_{97}	—	October 19, 2003	Kitt Peak	Spacewatch	·	2.7 km	MPC · JPL
115590	2003 UL_{97}	—	October 19, 2003	Kitt Peak	Spacewatch	·	2.7 km	MPC · JPL
115591	2003 UG_{98}	—	October 19, 2003	Anderson Mesa	LONEOS	TEL · slow	2.8 km	MPC · JPL
115592	2003 UL_{98}	—	October 19, 2003	Anderson Mesa	LONEOS	KON	5.3 km	MPC · JPL
115593	2003 UV_{98}	—	October 19, 2003	Anderson Mesa	LONEOS	·	6.4 km	MPC · JPL
115594	2003 UX_{98}	—	October 19, 2003	Anderson Mesa	LONEOS	·	3.8 km	MPC · JPL
115595	2003 UZ_{98}	—	October 19, 2003	Anderson Mesa	LONEOS	·	5.0 km	MPC · JPL
115596	2003 UC_{99}	—	October 19, 2003	Anderson Mesa	LONEOS	·	9.7 km	MPC · JPL
115597	2003 UF_{99}	—	October 19, 2003	Anderson Mesa	LONEOS	·	4.7 km	MPC · JPL
115598	2003 UH_{99}	—	October 19, 2003	Anderson Mesa	LONEOS	EOS	3.9 km	MPC · JPL
115599	2003 UJ_{99}	—	October 19, 2003	Anderson Mesa	LONEOS	·	3.2 km	MPC · JPL
115600	2003 UR_{99}	—	October 19, 2003	Kitt Peak	Spacewatch	MAR	1.7 km	MPC · JPL

== 115601–115700 ==
back to top

Designation			Discovery			Properties		Ref
Permanent	Provisional	Named after	Date	Site	Discoverer(s)	Category	Diam.	Ref
115601	2003 UT_{99}	—	October 19, 2003	Palomar	NEAT	·	1.7 km	MPC · JPL
115602	2003 UZ_{99}	—	October 19, 2003	Palomar	NEAT	·	2.8 km	MPC · JPL
115603	2003 UB_{100}	—	October 19, 2003	Palomar	NEAT	·	2.7 km	MPC · JPL
115604	2003 UE_{100}	—	October 19, 2003	Palomar	NEAT	·	6.0 km	MPC · JPL
115605	2003 UK_{100}	—	October 19, 2003	Palomar	NEAT	·	7.9 km	MPC · JPL
115606	2003 UJ_{101}	—	October 20, 2003	Palomar	NEAT	·	2.7 km	MPC · JPL
115607	2003 UR_{101}	—	October 20, 2003	Socorro	LINEAR	·	4.5 km	MPC · JPL
115608	2003 UR_{102}	—	October 20, 2003	Kitt Peak	Spacewatch	KOR	2.8 km	MPC · JPL
115609	2003 UA_{103}	—	October 20, 2003	Kitt Peak	Spacewatch	·	2.5 km	MPC · JPL
115610	2003 UE_{103}	—	October 20, 2003	Kitt Peak	Spacewatch	·	2.3 km	MPC · JPL
115611	2003 UG_{103}	—	October 20, 2003	Kitt Peak	Spacewatch	·	3.0 km	MPC · JPL
115612	2003 UK_{103}	—	October 20, 2003	Kitt Peak	Spacewatch	NYS	2.2 km	MPC · JPL
115613	2003 UW_{107}	—	October 19, 2003	Kitt Peak	Spacewatch	·	3.7 km	MPC · JPL
115614	2003 UZ_{111}	—	October 20, 2003	Socorro	LINEAR	·	3.3 km	MPC · JPL
115615	2003 UC_{112}	—	October 20, 2003	Socorro	LINEAR	·	3.5 km	MPC · JPL
115616	2003 UH_{112}	—	October 20, 2003	Socorro	LINEAR	·	3.0 km	MPC · JPL
115617	2003 UD_{113}	—	October 20, 2003	Socorro	LINEAR	·	2.8 km	MPC · JPL
115618	2003 UH_{114}	—	October 20, 2003	Socorro	LINEAR	RAF	2.6 km	MPC · JPL
115619	2003 UD_{115}	—	October 20, 2003	Kitt Peak	Spacewatch	·	4.5 km	MPC · JPL
115620	2003 US_{115}	—	October 20, 2003	Palomar	NEAT	·	6.6 km	MPC · JPL
115621	2003 UX_{116}	—	October 21, 2003	Socorro	LINEAR	·	4.8 km	MPC · JPL
115622	2003 UC_{117}	—	October 21, 2003	Socorro	LINEAR	HYG	5.2 km	MPC · JPL
115623	2003 UE_{118}	—	October 17, 2003	Anderson Mesa	LONEOS	V	1.4 km	MPC · JPL
115624	2003 US_{119}	—	October 18, 2003	Palomar	NEAT	·	8.9 km	MPC · JPL
115625	2003 UQ_{121}	—	October 19, 2003	Socorro	LINEAR	·	7.3 km	MPC · JPL
115626	2003 UU_{121}	—	October 19, 2003	Socorro	LINEAR	MAR	2.6 km	MPC · JPL
115627	2003 UW_{121}	—	October 19, 2003	Socorro	LINEAR	·	3.6 km	MPC · JPL
115628	2003 UX_{121}	—	October 19, 2003	Socorro	LINEAR	EUN	2.4 km	MPC · JPL
115629	2003 UH_{122}	—	October 19, 2003	Socorro	LINEAR	EUN	2.4 km	MPC · JPL
115630	2003 US_{122}	—	October 19, 2003	Socorro	LINEAR	TIR	6.8 km	MPC · JPL
115631	2003 UP_{123}	—	October 19, 2003	Kitt Peak	Spacewatch	·	1.8 km	MPC · JPL
115632	2003 UV_{124}	—	October 20, 2003	Socorro	LINEAR	KOR	2.7 km	MPC · JPL
115633	2003 UH_{125}	—	October 20, 2003	Socorro	LINEAR	EOS	3.7 km	MPC · JPL
115634	2003 UD_{126}	—	October 20, 2003	Socorro	LINEAR	·	3.9 km	MPC · JPL
115635	2003 UF_{126}	—	October 20, 2003	Socorro	LINEAR	·	3.2 km	MPC · JPL
115636	2003 UG_{126}	—	October 20, 2003	Socorro	LINEAR	EUN	2.0 km	MPC · JPL
115637	2003 UH_{126}	—	October 20, 2003	Socorro	LINEAR	fast	5.5 km	MPC · JPL
115638	2003 UO_{126}	—	October 20, 2003	Palomar	NEAT	·	5.8 km	MPC · JPL
115639	2003 UX_{129}	—	October 18, 2003	Palomar	NEAT	·	2.7 km	MPC · JPL
115640	2003 UF_{130}	—	October 18, 2003	Palomar	NEAT	GEF	2.2 km	MPC · JPL
115641	2003 UW_{130}	—	October 19, 2003	Anderson Mesa	LONEOS	·	5.9 km	MPC · JPL
115642	2003 UE_{131}	—	October 19, 2003	Anderson Mesa	LONEOS	·	3.0 km	MPC · JPL
115643	2003 UJ_{131}	—	October 19, 2003	Palomar	NEAT	·	3.9 km	MPC · JPL
115644	2003 UO_{132}	—	October 19, 2003	Palomar	NEAT	GEF	2.6 km	MPC · JPL
115645	2003 UP_{132}	—	October 19, 2003	Palomar	NEAT	EOS	3.3 km	MPC · JPL
115646	2003 UC_{133}	—	October 19, 2003	Palomar	NEAT	·	4.0 km	MPC · JPL
115647	2003 UF_{133}	—	October 20, 2003	Palomar	NEAT	·	5.1 km	MPC · JPL
115648	2003 UY_{133}	—	October 20, 2003	Palomar	NEAT	slow	3.0 km	MPC · JPL
115649	2003 UK_{135}	—	October 21, 2003	Palomar	NEAT	·	3.4 km	MPC · JPL
115650	2003 UU_{135}	—	October 21, 2003	Palomar	NEAT	·	2.0 km	MPC · JPL
115651	2003 UV_{136}	—	October 21, 2003	Socorro	LINEAR	AGN	2.3 km	MPC · JPL
115652	2003 UA_{137}	—	October 21, 2003	Palomar	NEAT	·	1.4 km	MPC · JPL
115653	2003 UK_{137}	—	October 21, 2003	Socorro	LINEAR	MAS	1.2 km	MPC · JPL
115654	2003 UQ_{137}	—	October 21, 2003	Socorro	LINEAR	·	1.8 km	MPC · JPL
115655	2003 US_{137}	—	October 21, 2003	Socorro	LINEAR	EOS	5.2 km	MPC · JPL
115656	2003 UT_{137}	—	October 21, 2003	Socorro	LINEAR	·	8.9 km	MPC · JPL
115657	2003 UW_{137}	—	October 21, 2003	Socorro	LINEAR	·	11 km	MPC · JPL
115658	2003 UT_{138}	—	October 16, 2003	Palomar	NEAT	·	4.3 km	MPC · JPL
115659	2003 UP_{139}	—	October 16, 2003	Anderson Mesa	LONEOS	·	8.4 km	MPC · JPL
115660	2003 UQ_{139}	—	October 16, 2003	Anderson Mesa	LONEOS	HOF	5.2 km	MPC · JPL
115661	2003 UZ_{139}	—	October 16, 2003	Anderson Mesa	LONEOS	EUN	2.2 km	MPC · JPL
115662	2003 UB_{141}	—	October 17, 2003	Socorro	LINEAR	·	4.6 km	MPC · JPL
115663	2003 UK_{142}	—	October 18, 2003	Anderson Mesa	LONEOS	·	3.8 km	MPC · JPL
115664	2003 UL_{142}	—	October 18, 2003	Anderson Mesa	LONEOS	·	6.5 km	MPC · JPL
115665	2003 UN_{142}	—	October 18, 2003	Anderson Mesa	LONEOS	·	6.2 km	MPC · JPL
115666	2003 UK_{143}	—	October 18, 2003	Anderson Mesa	LONEOS	·	2.1 km	MPC · JPL
115667	2003 UO_{143}	—	October 18, 2003	Anderson Mesa	LONEOS	·	2.9 km	MPC · JPL
115668	2003 UQ_{143}	—	October 18, 2003	Anderson Mesa	LONEOS	·	4.1 km	MPC · JPL
115669	2003 UW_{143}	—	October 18, 2003	Anderson Mesa	LONEOS	·	3.9 km	MPC · JPL
115670	2003 UK_{144}	—	October 18, 2003	Anderson Mesa	LONEOS	·	3.9 km	MPC · JPL
115671	2003 UT_{144}	—	October 18, 2003	Anderson Mesa	LONEOS	EOS	6.1 km	MPC · JPL
115672	2003 UW_{144}	—	October 18, 2003	Anderson Mesa	LONEOS	·	6.6 km	MPC · JPL
115673	2003 UW_{145}	—	October 18, 2003	Anderson Mesa	LONEOS	·	3.2 km	MPC · JPL
115674	2003 UY_{145}	—	October 18, 2003	Anderson Mesa	LONEOS	·	2.5 km	MPC · JPL
115675	2003 UE_{146}	—	October 18, 2003	Anderson Mesa	LONEOS	GEF	2.5 km	MPC · JPL
115676	2003 UF_{146}	—	October 18, 2003	Anderson Mesa	LONEOS	HYG	6.1 km	MPC · JPL
115677	2003 UA_{147}	—	October 18, 2003	Anderson Mesa	LONEOS	EUN	2.8 km	MPC · JPL
115678	2003 UV_{148}	—	October 19, 2003	Kitt Peak	Spacewatch	·	3.9 km	MPC · JPL
115679	2003 UX_{148}	—	October 19, 2003	Anderson Mesa	LONEOS	URS	6.9 km	MPC · JPL
115680	2003 UB_{149}	—	October 19, 2003	Palomar	NEAT	·	2.7 km	MPC · JPL
115681	2003 UR_{149}	—	October 20, 2003	Socorro	LINEAR	KOR	2.8 km	MPC · JPL
115682	2003 UN_{150}	—	October 20, 2003	Kitt Peak	Spacewatch	(5)	2.6 km	MPC · JPL
115683	2003 UP_{150}	—	October 20, 2003	Kitt Peak	Spacewatch	·	6.3 km	MPC · JPL
115684	2003 UQ_{150}	—	October 20, 2003	Kitt Peak	Spacewatch	·	6.3 km	MPC · JPL
115685	2003 UX_{150}	—	October 21, 2003	Anderson Mesa	LONEOS	·	3.7 km	MPC · JPL
115686	2003 UU_{151}	—	October 21, 2003	Kitt Peak	Spacewatch	·	2.6 km	MPC · JPL
115687	2003 UM_{152}	—	October 21, 2003	Palomar	NEAT	KOR	2.3 km	MPC · JPL
115688	2003 UA_{153}	—	October 21, 2003	Palomar	NEAT	·	3.1 km	MPC · JPL
115689	2003 UG_{153}	—	October 21, 2003	Palomar	NEAT	ADE	3.1 km	MPC · JPL
115690	2003 UG_{154}	—	October 20, 2003	Palomar	NEAT	VER	5.3 km	MPC · JPL
115691	2003 UH_{155}	—	October 20, 2003	Socorro	LINEAR	·	1.5 km	MPC · JPL
115692	2003 UV_{156}	—	October 20, 2003	Socorro	LINEAR	·	3.8 km	MPC · JPL
115693	2003 UF_{157}	—	October 20, 2003	Socorro	LINEAR	·	5.4 km	MPC · JPL
115694	2003 UT_{157}	—	October 20, 2003	Kitt Peak	Spacewatch	·	5.4 km	MPC · JPL
115695	2003 UM_{160}	—	October 21, 2003	Kitt Peak	Spacewatch	·	3.3 km	MPC · JPL
115696	2003 UJ_{162}	—	October 21, 2003	Socorro	LINEAR	·	3.8 km	MPC · JPL
115697	2003 UK_{162}	—	October 21, 2003	Socorro	LINEAR	V	1.5 km	MPC · JPL
115698	2003 UE_{163}	—	October 21, 2003	Socorro	LINEAR	·	1.7 km	MPC · JPL
115699	2003 UG_{163}	—	October 21, 2003	Socorro	LINEAR	·	7.4 km	MPC · JPL
115700	2003 UO_{163}	—	October 21, 2003	Socorro	LINEAR	CYB	12 km	MPC · JPL

== 115701–115800 ==
back to top

Designation			Discovery			Properties		Ref
Permanent	Provisional	Named after	Date	Site	Discoverer(s)	Category	Diam.	Ref
115701	2003 UW_{163}	—	October 21, 2003	Socorro	LINEAR	HYG	6.7 km	MPC · JPL
115702	2003 UH_{164}	—	October 21, 2003	Socorro	LINEAR	AGN	2.4 km	MPC · JPL
115703	2003 UW_{164}	—	October 21, 2003	Palomar	NEAT	·	4.1 km	MPC · JPL
115704	2003 US_{166}	—	October 21, 2003	Kitt Peak	Spacewatch	KOR	3.1 km	MPC · JPL
115705	2003 UU_{166}	—	October 21, 2003	Kvistaberg	Uppsala-DLR Asteroid Survey	·	4.2 km	MPC · JPL
115706	2003 UG_{168}	—	October 22, 2003	Socorro	LINEAR	·	4.3 km	MPC · JPL
115707	2003 UW_{168}	—	October 22, 2003	Socorro	LINEAR	THM	5.4 km	MPC · JPL
115708	2003 UA_{169}	—	October 22, 2003	Socorro	LINEAR	·	5.3 km	MPC · JPL
115709	2003 UR_{169}	—	October 22, 2003	Haleakala	NEAT	·	2.8 km	MPC · JPL
115710	2003 UY_{169}	—	October 22, 2003	Kitt Peak	Spacewatch	·	2.5 km	MPC · JPL
115711	2003 UR_{170}	—	October 22, 2003	Kitt Peak	Spacewatch	·	4.7 km	MPC · JPL
115712	2003 US_{172}	—	October 20, 2003	Socorro	LINEAR	·	2.7 km	MPC · JPL
115713	2003 UF_{173}	—	October 20, 2003	Palomar	NEAT	·	3.6 km	MPC · JPL
115714	2003 UN_{173}	—	October 20, 2003	Kitt Peak	Spacewatch	(1118)	6.6 km	MPC · JPL
115715	2003 UT_{173}	—	October 20, 2003	Palomar	NEAT	·	6.4 km	MPC · JPL
115716	2003 UV_{173}	—	October 20, 2003	Palomar	NEAT	·	8.1 km	MPC · JPL
115717	2003 UQ_{174}	—	October 21, 2003	Kitt Peak	Spacewatch	MAS	1.3 km	MPC · JPL
115718	2003 UQ_{175}	—	October 21, 2003	Anderson Mesa	LONEOS	·	3.1 km	MPC · JPL
115719	2003 UX_{175}	—	October 21, 2003	Palomar	NEAT	·	1.8 km	MPC · JPL
115720	2003 UP_{176}	—	October 21, 2003	Anderson Mesa	LONEOS	·	2.0 km	MPC · JPL
115721	2003 UT_{176}	—	October 21, 2003	Anderson Mesa	LONEOS	·	2.9 km	MPC · JPL
115722	2003 UG_{177}	—	October 21, 2003	Palomar	NEAT	·	3.8 km	MPC · JPL
115723	2003 UV_{179}	—	October 21, 2003	Socorro	LINEAR	·	1.8 km	MPC · JPL
115724	2003 UW_{179}	—	October 21, 2003	Socorro	LINEAR	·	5.0 km	MPC · JPL
115725	2003 US_{180}	—	October 21, 2003	Socorro	LINEAR	EOS	3.3 km	MPC · JPL
115726	2003 UY_{180}	—	October 21, 2003	Socorro	LINEAR	·	4.4 km	MPC · JPL
115727	2003 UD_{183}	—	October 21, 2003	Palomar	NEAT	KOR	2.2 km	MPC · JPL
115728	2003 UQ_{183}	—	October 21, 2003	Palomar	NEAT	·	3.2 km	MPC · JPL
115729	2003 UY_{183}	—	October 21, 2003	Palomar	NEAT	AST	4.8 km	MPC · JPL
115730	2003 UP_{184}	—	October 21, 2003	Palomar	NEAT	EOS	4.1 km	MPC · JPL
115731	2003 UC_{185}	—	October 21, 2003	Palomar	NEAT	·	1.1 km	MPC · JPL
115732	2003 UL_{185}	—	October 21, 2003	Kitt Peak	Spacewatch	·	3.2 km	MPC · JPL
115733	2003 UO_{185}	—	October 21, 2003	Kitt Peak	Spacewatch	KOR	3.0 km	MPC · JPL
115734	2003 UJ_{186}	—	October 22, 2003	Socorro	LINEAR	·	5.4 km	MPC · JPL
115735	2003 UN_{186}	—	October 22, 2003	Socorro	LINEAR	·	4.6 km	MPC · JPL
115736	2003 UB_{187}	—	October 22, 2003	Palomar	NEAT	(1298)	5.6 km	MPC · JPL
115737	2003 UU_{187}	—	October 22, 2003	Socorro	LINEAR	·	5.3 km	MPC · JPL
115738	2003 UZ_{187}	—	October 22, 2003	Socorro	LINEAR	·	1.4 km	MPC · JPL
115739	2003 UK_{188}	—	October 22, 2003	Socorro	LINEAR	·	2.0 km	MPC · JPL
115740	2003 UU_{188}	—	October 22, 2003	Kitt Peak	Spacewatch	·	4.6 km	MPC · JPL
115741	2003 UA_{189}	—	October 22, 2003	Kitt Peak	Spacewatch	HOF	5.9 km	MPC · JPL
115742	2003 UV_{189}	—	October 22, 2003	Haleakala	NEAT	·	3.6 km	MPC · JPL
115743	2003 UW_{189}	—	October 22, 2003	Haleakala	NEAT	THM	5.6 km	MPC · JPL
115744	2003 US_{193}	—	October 20, 2003	Palomar	NEAT	·	2.0 km	MPC · JPL
115745	2003 UU_{193}	—	October 20, 2003	Kitt Peak	Spacewatch	·	3.2 km	MPC · JPL
115746	2003 UW_{193}	—	October 20, 2003	Kitt Peak	Spacewatch	·	7.5 km	MPC · JPL
115747	2003 UB_{195}	—	October 20, 2003	Kitt Peak	Spacewatch	·	2.9 km	MPC · JPL
115748	2003 UO_{195}	—	October 20, 2003	Kitt Peak	Spacewatch	KOR	2.1 km	MPC · JPL
115749	2003 UC_{197}	—	October 21, 2003	Kitt Peak	Spacewatch	·	2.8 km	MPC · JPL
115750	2003 UU_{197}	—	October 21, 2003	Anderson Mesa	LONEOS	·	7.7 km	MPC · JPL
115751	2003 UR_{202}	—	October 21, 2003	Socorro	LINEAR	·	3.5 km	MPC · JPL
115752	2003 US_{202}	—	October 21, 2003	Socorro	LINEAR	·	8.6 km	MPC · JPL
115753	2003 UT_{202}	—	October 21, 2003	Socorro	LINEAR	·	5.6 km	MPC · JPL
115754	2003 UN_{204}	—	October 21, 2003	Kitt Peak	Spacewatch	·	3.8 km	MPC · JPL
115755	2003 UQ_{204}	—	October 21, 2003	Socorro	LINEAR	T_{j} (2.99)	11 km	MPC · JPL
115756	2003 UM_{205}	—	October 22, 2003	Socorro	LINEAR	AGN	2.2 km	MPC · JPL
115757	2003 US_{205}	—	October 22, 2003	Socorro	LINEAR	·	5.9 km	MPC · JPL
115758	2003 UH_{206}	—	October 22, 2003	Socorro	LINEAR	V	1.3 km	MPC · JPL
115759	2003 UJ_{206}	—	October 22, 2003	Socorro	LINEAR	·	3.4 km	MPC · JPL
115760	2003 UK_{206}	—	October 22, 2003	Socorro	LINEAR	·	2.2 km	MPC · JPL
115761	2003 UN_{206}	—	October 22, 2003	Socorro	LINEAR	·	5.4 km	MPC · JPL
115762	2003 UQ_{206}	—	October 22, 2003	Socorro	LINEAR	·	4.7 km	MPC · JPL
115763	2003 UU_{206}	—	October 22, 2003	Socorro	LINEAR	V	1.3 km	MPC · JPL
115764	2003 UW_{206}	—	October 22, 2003	Socorro	LINEAR	·	2.4 km	MPC · JPL
115765	2003 UZ_{206}	—	October 22, 2003	Socorro	LINEAR	JUN	1.5 km	MPC · JPL
115766	2003 UG_{207}	—	October 22, 2003	Socorro	LINEAR	·	5.6 km	MPC · JPL
115767	2003 UL_{207}	—	October 22, 2003	Socorro	LINEAR	·	4.8 km	MPC · JPL
115768	2003 UQ_{207}	—	October 22, 2003	Socorro	LINEAR	·	3.6 km	MPC · JPL
115769	2003 UY_{207}	—	October 22, 2003	Kitt Peak	Spacewatch	·	4.8 km	MPC · JPL
115770	2003 US_{208}	—	October 22, 2003	Kitt Peak	Spacewatch	·	2.1 km	MPC · JPL
115771	2003 UW_{208}	—	October 22, 2003	Socorro	LINEAR	·	4.4 km	MPC · JPL
115772	2003 UY_{208}	—	October 23, 2003	Kitt Peak	Spacewatch	·	2.3 km	MPC · JPL
115773	2003 UH_{209}	—	October 23, 2003	Anderson Mesa	LONEOS	·	3.9 km	MPC · JPL
115774	2003 UG_{210}	—	October 23, 2003	Anderson Mesa	LONEOS	·	3.5 km	MPC · JPL
115775	2003 UQ_{210}	—	October 23, 2003	Nogales	Tenagra II	·	9.8 km	MPC · JPL
115776	2003 UF_{212}	—	October 23, 2003	Kitt Peak	Spacewatch	·	3.7 km	MPC · JPL
115777	2003 UJ_{213}	—	October 23, 2003	Haleakala	NEAT	·	1.8 km	MPC · JPL
115778	2003 UP_{215}	—	October 21, 2003	Kitt Peak	Spacewatch	·	3.3 km	MPC · JPL
115779	2003 UO_{216}	—	October 21, 2003	Socorro	LINEAR	·	1.5 km	MPC · JPL
115780	2003 US_{216}	—	October 21, 2003	Socorro	LINEAR	·	1.2 km	MPC · JPL
115781	2003 UH_{217}	—	October 21, 2003	Socorro	LINEAR	·	2.7 km	MPC · JPL
115782	2003 UL_{217}	—	October 21, 2003	Socorro	LINEAR	·	4.0 km	MPC · JPL
115783	2003 UQ_{217}	—	October 21, 2003	Socorro	LINEAR	·	3.2 km	MPC · JPL
115784	2003 UJ_{218}	—	October 21, 2003	Socorro	LINEAR	·	3.3 km	MPC · JPL
115785	2003 UM_{218}	—	October 21, 2003	Socorro	LINEAR	·	3.4 km	MPC · JPL
115786	2003 UQ_{218}	—	October 21, 2003	Socorro	LINEAR	·	4.9 km	MPC · JPL
115787	2003 UV_{218}	—	October 21, 2003	Kitt Peak	Spacewatch	·	2.4 km	MPC · JPL
115788	2003 UR_{220}	—	October 21, 2003	Socorro	LINEAR	T_{j} (2.97)	13 km	MPC · JPL
115789	2003 UN_{222}	—	October 22, 2003	Socorro	LINEAR	·	3.6 km	MPC · JPL
115790	2003 US_{222}	—	October 22, 2003	Socorro	LINEAR	·	2.4 km	MPC · JPL
115791	2003 UG_{223}	—	October 22, 2003	Socorro	LINEAR	URS	8.6 km	MPC · JPL
115792	2003 UT_{223}	—	October 22, 2003	Socorro	LINEAR	·	2.5 km	MPC · JPL
115793	2003 UC_{226}	—	October 22, 2003	Socorro	LINEAR	EUN	3.4 km	MPC · JPL
115794	2003 UL_{227}	—	October 23, 2003	Kitt Peak	Spacewatch	HOF	3.8 km	MPC · JPL
115795	2003 UM_{227}	—	October 23, 2003	Kitt Peak	Spacewatch	·	5.7 km	MPC · JPL
115796	2003 UZ_{227}	—	October 23, 2003	Kitt Peak	Spacewatch	·	1.5 km	MPC · JPL
115797	2003 UA_{228}	—	October 23, 2003	Kitt Peak	Spacewatch	·	5.7 km	MPC · JPL
115798	2003 UA_{230}	—	October 23, 2003	Kitt Peak	Spacewatch	·	5.4 km	MPC · JPL
115799	2003 UX_{233}	—	October 24, 2003	Socorro	LINEAR	·	2.0 km	MPC · JPL
115800	2003 UQ_{235}	—	October 24, 2003	Kitt Peak	Spacewatch	·	5.7 km	MPC · JPL

== 115801–115900 ==
back to top

Designation			Discovery			Properties		Ref
Permanent	Provisional	Named after	Date	Site	Discoverer(s)	Category	Diam.	Ref
115801 Punahou	2003 UW_{236}	Punahou	October 23, 2003	Junk Bond	D. Healy	MAS	890 m	MPC · JPL
115802	2003 UX_{237}	—	October 23, 2003	Kitt Peak	Spacewatch	·	2.8 km	MPC · JPL
115803	2003 UY_{237}	—	October 23, 2003	Haleakala	NEAT	·	2.7 km	MPC · JPL
115804	2003 UE_{238}	—	October 23, 2003	Haleakala	NEAT	·	4.6 km	MPC · JPL
115805	2003 UG_{238}	—	October 23, 2003	Haleakala	NEAT	·	2.5 km	MPC · JPL
115806	2003 UH_{238}	—	October 23, 2003	Haleakala	NEAT	·	7.1 km	MPC · JPL
115807	2003 UJ_{238}	—	October 23, 2003	Haleakala	NEAT	·	2.5 km	MPC · JPL
115808	2003 UL_{238}	—	October 23, 2003	Haleakala	NEAT	CYB	10 km	MPC · JPL
115809	2003 UR_{239}	—	October 24, 2003	Socorro	LINEAR	HOF	5.8 km	MPC · JPL
115810	2003 UU_{239}	—	October 24, 2003	Socorro	LINEAR	·	3.3 km	MPC · JPL
115811	2003 UH_{240}	—	October 24, 2003	Socorro	LINEAR	KOR	2.4 km	MPC · JPL
115812	2003 UD_{243}	—	October 24, 2003	Socorro	LINEAR	·	3.3 km	MPC · JPL
115813	2003 US_{243}	—	October 24, 2003	Socorro	LINEAR	·	3.6 km	MPC · JPL
115814	2003 UZ_{243}	—	October 24, 2003	Socorro	LINEAR	·	3.2 km	MPC · JPL
115815	2003 UF_{244}	—	October 24, 2003	Socorro	LINEAR	·	6.0 km	MPC · JPL
115816	2003 UT_{245}	—	October 24, 2003	Socorro	LINEAR	·	7.2 km	MPC · JPL
115817	2003 UV_{245}	—	October 24, 2003	Socorro	LINEAR	·	1.3 km	MPC · JPL
115818	2003 UH_{246}	—	October 24, 2003	Socorro	LINEAR	·	6.7 km	MPC · JPL
115819	2003 UK_{246}	—	October 24, 2003	Socorro	LINEAR	·	5.2 km	MPC · JPL
115820	2003 UK_{250}	—	October 25, 2003	Socorro	LINEAR	·	1.8 km	MPC · JPL
115821	2003 UP_{251}	—	October 25, 2003	Haleakala	NEAT	·	4.8 km	MPC · JPL
115822	2003 UA_{252}	—	October 26, 2003	Catalina	CSS	·	1.1 km	MPC · JPL
115823	2003 UF_{252}	—	October 26, 2003	Catalina	CSS	·	3.9 km	MPC · JPL
115824	2003 UH_{252}	—	October 26, 2003	Socorro	LINEAR	EOS	3.6 km	MPC · JPL
115825	2003 US_{252}	—	October 26, 2003	Kitt Peak	Spacewatch	·	5.9 km	MPC · JPL
115826	2003 UT_{252}	—	October 26, 2003	Kitt Peak	Spacewatch	THM	4.7 km	MPC · JPL
115827	2003 UW_{252}	—	October 26, 2003	Kitt Peak	Spacewatch	·	3.8 km	MPC · JPL
115828	2003 UR_{253}	—	October 22, 2003	Palomar	NEAT	·	3.0 km	MPC · JPL
115829	2003 UU_{253}	—	October 22, 2003	Anderson Mesa	LONEOS	·	6.1 km	MPC · JPL
115830	2003 UO_{255}	—	October 25, 2003	Socorro	LINEAR	·	2.0 km	MPC · JPL
115831	2003 UX_{258}	—	October 25, 2003	Socorro	LINEAR	HYG	4.0 km	MPC · JPL
115832	2003 UA_{259}	—	October 25, 2003	Socorro	LINEAR	·	5.4 km	MPC · JPL
115833	2003 UB_{259}	—	October 25, 2003	Socorro	LINEAR	·	4.9 km	MPC · JPL
115834	2003 UP_{259}	—	October 25, 2003	Socorro	LINEAR	·	6.1 km	MPC · JPL
115835	2003 UD_{260}	—	October 25, 2003	Socorro	LINEAR	fast	5.1 km	MPC · JPL
115836	2003 UJ_{260}	—	October 25, 2003	Socorro	LINEAR	·	4.3 km	MPC · JPL
115837	2003 US_{260}	—	October 25, 2003	Haleakala	NEAT	·	2.2 km	MPC · JPL
115838	2003 UX_{260}	—	October 26, 2003	Anderson Mesa	LONEOS	·	2.5 km	MPC · JPL
115839	2003 UD_{262}	—	October 26, 2003	Kitt Peak	Spacewatch	·	4.8 km	MPC · JPL
115840	2003 UJ_{262}	—	October 26, 2003	Haleakala	NEAT	·	3.1 km	MPC · JPL
115841	2003 UL_{262}	—	October 26, 2003	Haleakala	NEAT	EOS	3.3 km	MPC · JPL
115842	2003 UP_{262}	—	October 26, 2003	Haleakala	NEAT	CYB	8.2 km	MPC · JPL
115843	2003 UN_{264}	—	October 27, 2003	Socorro	LINEAR	SYL · CYB	9.5 km	MPC · JPL
115844	2003 UU_{264}	—	October 27, 2003	Socorro	LINEAR	·	2.2 km	MPC · JPL
115845	2003 UY_{264}	—	October 27, 2003	Socorro	LINEAR	ERI	3.3 km	MPC · JPL
115846	2003 UA_{265}	—	October 27, 2003	Socorro	LINEAR	CYB	7.2 km	MPC · JPL
115847	2003 UF_{265}	—	October 27, 2003	Socorro	LINEAR	·	4.5 km	MPC · JPL
115848	2003 UL_{266}	—	October 28, 2003	Socorro	LINEAR	MAS	1.7 km	MPC · JPL
115849	2003 UD_{267}	—	October 28, 2003	Socorro	LINEAR	HYG	4.7 km	MPC · JPL
115850	2003 UN_{268}	—	October 28, 2003	Socorro	LINEAR	·	3.4 km	MPC · JPL
115851	2003 UT_{269}	—	October 29, 2003	Socorro	LINEAR	(11882)	3.5 km	MPC · JPL
115852	2003 UX_{269}	—	October 24, 2003	Bergisch Gladbach	W. Bickel	·	1.4 km	MPC · JPL
115853	2003 UK_{271}	—	October 17, 2003	Palomar	NEAT	TIR ·	7.8 km	MPC · JPL
115854	2003 UT_{272}	—	October 29, 2003	Socorro	LINEAR	TIR	2.6 km	MPC · JPL
115855	2003 UX_{272}	—	October 29, 2003	Socorro	LINEAR	NYS	2.2 km	MPC · JPL
115856	2003 UY_{272}	—	October 29, 2003	Socorro	LINEAR	·	3.4 km	MPC · JPL
115857	2003 UA_{273}	—	October 29, 2003	Socorro	LINEAR	·	3.3 km	MPC · JPL
115858	2003 UE_{273}	—	October 29, 2003	Socorro	LINEAR	·	5.7 km	MPC · JPL
115859	2003 UG_{273}	—	October 29, 2003	Socorro	LINEAR	·	2.6 km	MPC · JPL
115860	2003 UT_{273}	—	October 29, 2003	Kitt Peak	Spacewatch	·	2.7 km	MPC · JPL
115861	2003 UE_{274}	—	October 29, 2003	Haleakala	NEAT	DOR	4.6 km	MPC · JPL
115862	2003 UK_{274}	—	October 30, 2003	Socorro	LINEAR	·	4.2 km	MPC · JPL
115863	2003 UL_{274}	—	October 30, 2003	Socorro	LINEAR	·	2.0 km	MPC · JPL
115864	2003 US_{274}	—	October 30, 2003	Socorro	LINEAR	·	1.3 km	MPC · JPL
115865	2003 UY_{274}	—	October 29, 2003	Socorro	LINEAR	·	3.9 km	MPC · JPL
115866	2003 UH_{275}	—	October 29, 2003	Socorro	LINEAR	EOS	4.0 km	MPC · JPL
115867	2003 UQ_{278}	—	October 25, 2003	Socorro	LINEAR	·	2.2 km	MPC · JPL
115868	2003 UT_{278}	—	October 25, 2003	Socorro	LINEAR	·	1.9 km	MPC · JPL
115869	2003 UW_{278}	—	October 25, 2003	Socorro	LINEAR	V	1.2 km	MPC · JPL
115870	2003 UZ_{278}	—	October 26, 2003	Socorro	LINEAR	·	3.7 km	MPC · JPL
115871	2003 UA_{279}	—	October 26, 2003	Kitt Peak	Spacewatch	·	3.1 km	MPC · JPL
115872	2003 UC_{280}	—	October 27, 2003	Socorro	LINEAR	·	3.0 km	MPC · JPL
115873	2003 UT_{280}	—	October 28, 2003	Socorro	LINEAR	·	2.4 km	MPC · JPL
115874	2003 UZ_{280}	—	October 28, 2003	Socorro	LINEAR	·	1.2 km	MPC · JPL
115875	2003 UA_{281}	—	October 28, 2003	Socorro	LINEAR	·	2.3 km	MPC · JPL
115876	2003 UK_{282}	—	October 29, 2003	Anderson Mesa	LONEOS	·	5.4 km	MPC · JPL
115877	2003 UO_{282}	—	October 29, 2003	Anderson Mesa	LONEOS	WIT	1.9 km	MPC · JPL
115878	2003 UR_{282}	—	October 29, 2003	Anderson Mesa	LONEOS	·	1.5 km	MPC · JPL
115879	2003 UV_{282}	—	October 29, 2003	Anderson Mesa	LONEOS	·	3.5 km	MPC · JPL
115880	2003 UP_{283}	—	October 30, 2003	Socorro	LINEAR	EUN	3.2 km	MPC · JPL
115881	2003 UQ_{284}	—	October 29, 2003	Socorro	LINEAR	·	3.4 km	MPC · JPL
115882	2003 UM_{293}	—	October 18, 2003	Socorro	LINEAR	·	3.8 km	MPC · JPL
115883	2003 UX_{299}	—	October 16, 2003	Kitt Peak	Spacewatch	MAS	1.8 km	MPC · JPL
115884	2003 UD_{309}	—	October 19, 2003	Kitt Peak	Spacewatch	·	3.6 km	MPC · JPL
115885 Ganz	2003 VL_{1}	Ganz	November 6, 2003	Piszkéstető	K. Sárneczky, B. Sipőcz	V	1.1 km	MPC · JPL
115886	2003 VQ_{1}	—	November 2, 2003	Socorro	LINEAR	·	3.8 km	MPC · JPL
115887	2003 VT_{1}	—	November 1, 2003	Socorro	LINEAR	·	3.0 km	MPC · JPL
115888	2003 VU_{1}	—	November 1, 2003	Socorro	LINEAR	·	1.4 km	MPC · JPL
115889	2003 VC_{2}	—	November 3, 2003	Socorro	LINEAR	LIX	6.4 km	MPC · JPL
115890	2003 VE_{2}	—	November 3, 2003	Socorro	LINEAR	·	1.1 km	MPC · JPL
115891 Scottmichael	2003 VW_{2}	Scottmichael	November 14, 2003	Wrightwood	J. W. Young	·	1.8 km	MPC · JPL
115892	2003 VR_{3}	—	November 15, 2003	Kitt Peak	Spacewatch	·	2.9 km	MPC · JPL
115893	2003 VA_{4}	—	November 14, 2003	Palomar	NEAT	·	4.6 km	MPC · JPL
115894	2003 VD_{4}	—	November 14, 2003	Palomar	NEAT	EOS	3.4 km	MPC · JPL
115895	2003 VE_{6}	—	November 14, 2003	Palomar	NEAT	V	1.3 km	MPC · JPL
115896	2003 VF_{6}	—	November 14, 2003	Palomar	NEAT	·	4.4 km	MPC · JPL
115897	2003 VF_{8}	—	November 14, 2003	Palomar	NEAT	·	3.1 km	MPC · JPL
115898	2003 VO_{9}	—	November 15, 2003	Palomar	NEAT	EOS	4.0 km	MPC · JPL
115899	2003 VR_{9}	—	November 15, 2003	Kitt Peak	Spacewatch	·	8.3 km	MPC · JPL
115900	2003 VZ_{9}	—	November 4, 2003	Socorro	LINEAR	H	1.3 km	MPC · JPL

== 115901–116000 ==
back to top

Designation			Discovery			Properties		Ref
Permanent	Provisional	Named after	Date	Site	Discoverer(s)	Category	Diam.	Ref
115901	2003 VK_{10}	—	November 15, 2003	Palomar	NEAT	·	3.2 km	MPC · JPL
115902	2003 VU_{11}	—	November 3, 2003	Socorro	LINEAR	·	6.6 km	MPC · JPL
115903	2003 VZ_{11}	—	November 3, 2003	Socorro	LINEAR	ADE	6.7 km	MPC · JPL
115904	2003 WC	—	November 16, 2003	Kitt Peak	Spacewatch	(5)	1.8 km	MPC · JPL
115905	2003 WT	—	November 16, 2003	Catalina	CSS	·	2.2 km	MPC · JPL
115906	2003 WB_{1}	—	November 16, 2003	Catalina	CSS	·	2.4 km	MPC · JPL
115907	2003 WP_{1}	—	November 16, 2003	Catalina	CSS	KOR	2.3 km	MPC · JPL
115908	2003 WZ_{1}	—	November 16, 2003	Catalina	CSS	·	3.7 km	MPC · JPL
115909	2003 WF_{3}	—	November 16, 2003	Kitt Peak	Spacewatch	EOS	3.3 km	MPC · JPL
115910	2003 WV_{3}	—	November 16, 2003	Catalina	CSS	·	3.7 km	MPC · JPL
115911	2003 WB_{4}	—	November 16, 2003	Catalina	CSS	·	1.6 km	MPC · JPL
115912	2003 WK_{5}	—	November 18, 2003	Palomar	NEAT	·	2.2 km	MPC · JPL
115913	2003 WS_{5}	—	November 18, 2003	Palomar	NEAT	EOS	3.4 km	MPC · JPL
115914	2003 WE_{6}	—	November 18, 2003	Palomar	NEAT	NYS ·	3.4 km	MPC · JPL
115915	2003 WT_{6}	—	November 18, 2003	Palomar	NEAT	·	3.3 km	MPC · JPL
115916	2003 WB_{8}	—	November 18, 2003	Socorro	LINEAR	T_{j} (2.84)	8.4 km	MPC · JPL
115917	2003 WE_{8}	—	November 16, 2003	Kitt Peak	Spacewatch	ADE	3.6 km	MPC · JPL
115918	2003 WG_{9}	—	November 18, 2003	Kitt Peak	Spacewatch	·	2.7 km	MPC · JPL
115919	2003 WS_{10}	—	November 18, 2003	Kitt Peak	Spacewatch	·	2.9 km	MPC · JPL
115920	2003 WO_{11}	—	November 18, 2003	Palomar	NEAT	·	3.5 km	MPC · JPL
115921	2003 WQ_{11}	—	November 18, 2003	Palomar	NEAT	·	3.8 km	MPC · JPL
115922	2003 WR_{11}	—	November 18, 2003	Palomar	NEAT	·	3.9 km	MPC · JPL
115923	2003 WS_{11}	—	November 18, 2003	Palomar	NEAT	·	2.0 km	MPC · JPL
115924	2003 WH_{12}	—	November 18, 2003	Palomar	NEAT	·	3.6 km	MPC · JPL
115925	2003 WZ_{14}	—	November 16, 2003	Kitt Peak	Spacewatch	NYS	1.7 km	MPC · JPL
115926	2003 WJ_{17}	—	November 18, 2003	Palomar	NEAT	·	3.4 km	MPC · JPL
115927	2003 WQ_{17}	—	November 18, 2003	Palomar	NEAT	·	3.2 km	MPC · JPL
115928	2003 WB_{19}	—	November 19, 2003	Socorro	LINEAR	·	1.9 km	MPC · JPL
115929	2003 WU_{20}	—	November 19, 2003	Socorro	LINEAR	RAF	1.6 km	MPC · JPL
115930	2003 WH_{22}	—	November 19, 2003	Palomar	NEAT	CYB	11 km	MPC · JPL
115931	2003 WJ_{22}	—	November 19, 2003	Socorro	LINEAR	H	1.2 km	MPC · JPL
115932	2003 WF_{23}	—	November 18, 2003	Kitt Peak	Spacewatch	·	3.8 km	MPC · JPL
115933	2003 WP_{23}	—	November 18, 2003	Kitt Peak	Spacewatch	KOR	2.0 km	MPC · JPL
115934	2003 WJ_{24}	—	November 19, 2003	Kitt Peak	Spacewatch	·	1.2 km	MPC · JPL
115935	2003 WF_{25}	—	November 18, 2003	Kitt Peak	Spacewatch	·	2.2 km	MPC · JPL
115936	2003 WF_{26}	—	November 18, 2003	Goodricke-Pigott	Goodricke-Pigott	·	3.3 km	MPC · JPL
115937	2003 WG_{26}	—	November 18, 2003	Goodricke-Pigott	R. A. Tucker	ADE	4.7 km	MPC · JPL
115938	2003 WV_{28}	—	November 18, 2003	Kitt Peak	Spacewatch	V	1.2 km	MPC · JPL
115939	2003 WC_{29}	—	November 18, 2003	Palomar	NEAT	HYG	6.5 km	MPC · JPL
115940	2003 WD_{29}	—	November 18, 2003	Kitt Peak	Spacewatch	V	1.2 km	MPC · JPL
115941	2003 WE_{29}	—	November 18, 2003	Kitt Peak	Spacewatch	EOS	3.3 km	MPC · JPL
115942	2003 WR_{29}	—	November 18, 2003	Kitt Peak	Spacewatch	·	4.4 km	MPC · JPL
115943	2003 WC_{30}	—	November 18, 2003	Kitt Peak	Spacewatch	·	1.9 km	MPC · JPL
115944	2003 WD_{30}	—	November 18, 2003	Kitt Peak	Spacewatch	·	2.6 km	MPC · JPL
115945	2003 WE_{30}	—	November 18, 2003	Kitt Peak	Spacewatch	·	2.6 km	MPC · JPL
115946	2003 WU_{30}	—	November 18, 2003	Kitt Peak	Spacewatch	·	4.2 km	MPC · JPL
115947	2003 WJ_{32}	—	November 18, 2003	Kitt Peak	Spacewatch	·	2.5 km	MPC · JPL
115948	2003 WQ_{32}	—	November 18, 2003	Kitt Peak	Spacewatch	·	2.2 km	MPC · JPL
115949	2003 WL_{33}	—	November 18, 2003	Kitt Peak	Spacewatch	·	3.3 km	MPC · JPL
115950 Kocherpeter	2003 WT_{33}	Kocherpeter	November 18, 2003	Vicques	M. Ory	(5)	2.2 km	MPC · JPL
115951	2003 WD_{34}	—	November 19, 2003	Kitt Peak	Spacewatch	·	3.9 km	MPC · JPL
115952	2003 WG_{34}	—	November 19, 2003	Kitt Peak	Spacewatch	·	6.6 km	MPC · JPL
115953	2003 WJ_{35}	—	November 19, 2003	Socorro	LINEAR	·	1.9 km	MPC · JPL
115954	2003 WD_{40}	—	November 19, 2003	Kitt Peak	Spacewatch	·	4.7 km	MPC · JPL
115955	2003 WJ_{40}	—	November 19, 2003	Kitt Peak	Spacewatch	·	2.2 km	MPC · JPL
115956	2003 WK_{40}	—	November 19, 2003	Kitt Peak	Spacewatch	·	2.4 km	MPC · JPL
115957	2003 WS_{40}	—	November 19, 2003	Kitt Peak	Spacewatch	·	2.2 km	MPC · JPL
115958	2003 WD_{41}	—	November 19, 2003	Kitt Peak	Spacewatch	·	3.0 km	MPC · JPL
115959	2003 WJ_{41}	—	November 19, 2003	Kitt Peak	Spacewatch	·	2.1 km	MPC · JPL
115960	2003 WK_{41}	—	November 19, 2003	Kitt Peak	Spacewatch	·	4.0 km	MPC · JPL
115961	2003 WM_{41}	—	November 19, 2003	Kitt Peak	Spacewatch	·	2.2 km	MPC · JPL
115962	2003 WN_{41}	—	November 19, 2003	Kitt Peak	Spacewatch	(5)	2.2 km	MPC · JPL
115963	2003 WO_{41}	—	November 19, 2003	Kitt Peak	Spacewatch	·	3.1 km	MPC · JPL
115964	2003 WH_{42}	—	November 21, 2003	Socorro	LINEAR	·	4.8 km	MPC · JPL
115965	2003 WY_{43}	—	November 19, 2003	Palomar	NEAT	EOS	4.2 km	MPC · JPL
115966	2003 WH_{44}	—	November 19, 2003	Palomar	NEAT	·	3.2 km	MPC · JPL
115967	2003 WQ_{44}	—	November 19, 2003	Palomar	NEAT	·	4.8 km	MPC · JPL
115968	2003 WT_{44}	—	November 19, 2003	Palomar	NEAT	·	5.3 km	MPC · JPL
115969	2003 WA_{45}	—	November 19, 2003	Palomar	NEAT	·	3.6 km	MPC · JPL
115970	2003 WQ_{45}	—	November 19, 2003	Palomar	NEAT	EOS	3.0 km	MPC · JPL
115971	2003 WR_{45}	—	November 19, 2003	Palomar	NEAT	EOS ·	8.1 km	MPC · JPL
115972	2003 WK_{46}	—	November 18, 2003	Palomar	NEAT	·	1.4 km	MPC · JPL
115973	2003 WM_{49}	—	November 19, 2003	Socorro	LINEAR	·	3.3 km	MPC · JPL
115974	2003 WS_{54}	—	November 20, 2003	Socorro	LINEAR	·	3.4 km	MPC · JPL
115975	2003 WJ_{55}	—	November 20, 2003	Socorro	LINEAR	·	1.7 km	MPC · JPL
115976	2003 WQ_{55}	—	November 20, 2003	Socorro	LINEAR	·	1.8 km	MPC · JPL
115977	2003 WC_{56}	—	November 20, 2003	Socorro	LINEAR	·	4.1 km	MPC · JPL
115978	2003 WQ_{56}	—	November 21, 2003	Socorro	LINEAR	·	1.4 km	MPC · JPL
115979	2003 WX_{56}	—	November 18, 2003	Kitt Peak	Spacewatch	HNS	1.8 km	MPC · JPL
115980	2003 WH_{58}	—	November 18, 2003	Kitt Peak	Spacewatch	KOR	2.2 km	MPC · JPL
115981	2003 WT_{58}	—	November 18, 2003	Kitt Peak	Spacewatch	·	2.3 km	MPC · JPL
115982	2003 WE_{59}	—	November 18, 2003	Kitt Peak	Spacewatch	·	4.3 km	MPC · JPL
115983	2003 WJ_{59}	—	November 18, 2003	Kitt Peak	Spacewatch	AST	3.2 km	MPC · JPL
115984	2003 WZ_{60}	—	November 19, 2003	Kitt Peak	Spacewatch	·	3.0 km	MPC · JPL
115985	2003 WE_{61}	—	November 19, 2003	Kitt Peak	Spacewatch	·	2.4 km	MPC · JPL
115986	2003 WT_{61}	—	November 19, 2003	Kitt Peak	Spacewatch	·	4.6 km	MPC · JPL
115987	2003 WA_{62}	—	November 19, 2003	Kitt Peak	Spacewatch	THM	5.8 km	MPC · JPL
115988	2003 WQ_{62}	—	November 19, 2003	Kitt Peak	Spacewatch	THM	5.1 km	MPC · JPL
115989	2003 WD_{63}	—	November 19, 2003	Kitt Peak	Spacewatch	·	2.9 km	MPC · JPL
115990	2003 WF_{64}	—	November 19, 2003	Kitt Peak	Spacewatch	·	2.9 km	MPC · JPL
115991	2003 WH_{64}	—	November 19, 2003	Kitt Peak	Spacewatch	·	1.7 km	MPC · JPL
115992	2003 WV_{65}	—	November 19, 2003	Kitt Peak	Spacewatch	·	5.9 km	MPC · JPL
115993	2003 WF_{67}	—	November 19, 2003	Kitt Peak	Spacewatch	(5)	1.9 km	MPC · JPL
115994	2003 WP_{68}	—	November 19, 2003	Kitt Peak	Spacewatch	·	1.8 km	MPC · JPL
115995	2003 WT_{69}	—	November 19, 2003	Kitt Peak	Spacewatch	·	3.5 km	MPC · JPL
115996	2003 WZ_{70}	—	November 20, 2003	Palomar	NEAT	·	4.0 km	MPC · JPL
115997	2003 WP_{72}	—	November 20, 2003	Socorro	LINEAR	·	5.1 km	MPC · JPL
115998	2003 WS_{72}	—	November 20, 2003	Socorro	LINEAR	HOF	5.7 km	MPC · JPL
115999	2003 WD_{73}	—	November 20, 2003	Socorro	LINEAR	·	3.9 km	MPC · JPL
116000	2003 WK_{73}	—	November 20, 2003	Socorro	LINEAR	·	4.8 km	MPC · JPL

back to top

== See also ==
- Meanings of minor-planet names: 115001–116000
