= Brigitta Sipőcz =

Hungarian astronomer

- Occupation: Astronomer

Minor planets discovered: 36
see § List of discovered minor planets

Brigitta Sipőcz is a Hungarian astronomer and discoverer of minor planets.

Sipőcz works as a researcher at the University of Hertfordshire in the United Kingdom. At the time she was searching for the transit of M dwarfs.

The Minor Planet Center credits her with the discovery of 35 minor planets, all made in collaboration with Krisztián Sárneczky in 2003.

== List of discovered minor planets ==
84921 Morkoláb	9 November 2003	list^{[A]}
90370 Jókaimór	7 July 2003	list^{[A]}
95954 Bayzoltán	23 August 2003	list^{[A]}
114987 Tittel	26 August 2003	list^{[A]}
114990 Szeidl	26 August 2003	list^{[A]}
114991 Balázs	26 August 2003	list^{[A]}
115058 Tassantal	4 September 2003	list^{[A]}
115059 Nagykároly	5 September 2003	list^{[A]}
115254 Fényi	22 September 2003	list^{[A]}
115885 Ganz	6 November 2003	list^{[A]}

128062 Szrogh	6 July 2003	list^{[A]}
133161 Ruttkai	24 August 2003	list^{[A]}
133250 Rubik	5 September 2003	list^{[A]}
157020 Fertőszentmiklós	26 August 2003	list^{[A]}
161349 Mecsek	19 September 2003	list^{[A]}
163819 Teleki	7 September 2003	list^{[A]}
(177157) 2003 SF_{33}	18 September 2003	list^{[A]}
191341 Lánczos	24 August 2003	list^{[A]}
(191551) 2003 VK_{1}	6 November 2003	list^{[A]}
196736 Munkácsy	19 September 2003	list^{[A]}

209054 Lombkató	23 August 2003	list^{[A]}
(209089) 2003 SH_{33}	18 September 2003	list^{[A]}
228893 Gerevich	6 September 2003	list^{[A]}
230656 Kovácspál	19 September 2003	list^{[A]}
235201 Lorántffy	23 September 2003	list^{[A]}
253412 Ráskaylea	23 August 2003	list^{[A]}
(265059) 2003 SD_{33}	18 September 2003	list^{[A]}
287693 Hugonnaivilma	24 August 2003	list^{[A]}
(287711) 2003 QO_{69}	26 August 2003	list^{[A]}
287787 Karády	20 September 2003	list^{[A]}

334756 Leövey	4 September 2003	list^{[A]}
(338578) 2003 SU_{111}	20 September 2003	list^{[A]}
344641 Szeleczky	23 August 2003	list^{[A]}
(351040) 2003 SC_{170}	22 September 2003	list^{[A]}
(373867) 2003 SG_{33}	18 September 2003	list^{[A]}
(402008) 2003 QZ_{69}	26 August 2003	list^{[A]}
Co-discovery made with:^{A} K. Sárneczky
