= Meanings of minor-planet names: 114001–115000 =

As minor planet discoveries are confirmed, they are given a permanent number by the IAU's Minor Planet Center (MPC), and the discoverers can then submit names for them, following the IAU's naming conventions. The list below concerns those minor planets in the specified number-range that have received names, and explains the meanings of those names.

Official naming citations of newly named small Solar System bodies are approved and published in a bulletin by IAU's Working Group for Small Bodies Nomenclature (WGSBN). Before May 2021, citations were published in MPC's Minor Planet Circulars for many decades. Recent citations can also be found on the JPL Small-Body Database (SBDB). Until his death in 2016, German astronomer Lutz D. Schmadel compiled these citations into the Dictionary of Minor Planet Names (DMP) and regularly updated the collection.

Based on Paul Herget's The Names of the Minor Planets, Schmadel also researched the unclear origin of numerous asteroids, most of which had been named prior to World War II. This article incorporates text from this source, which is in the public domain: SBDB New namings may only be added to this list below after official publication as the preannouncement of names is condemned. The WGSBN publishes a comprehensive guideline for the naming rules of non-cometary small Solar System bodies.

== 114001–114100 ==
Named minor planet	Provisional	This minor planet was named for...	Ref · Catalog
114022 Bizyaev	2002 UZ_{51}	Dmitry Bizyaev (born 1969), a Russian-American astronomer with the Sloan Digital Sky Survey	JPL · 114022
114023 Harvanek	2002 UL_{52}	Michael J. Harvanek (born 1963), American astronomer with the Sloan Digital Sky Survey	JPL · 114023
114024 Scotkleinman	2002 UB_{62}	Scot J. Kleinman (born 1965), American astronomer with the Sloan Digital Sky Survey	JPL · 114024
114025 Krzesinski	2002 UC_{63}	Jurek Krzesiński (born 1962), American astronomer with the Sloan Digital Sky Survey	JPL · 114025
114026 Emalanushenko	2002 UO_{64}	Elena Malanushenko (born 1956), Ukrainian-American astronomer with the Sloan Digital Sky Survey	JPL · 114026
114027 Malanushenko	2002 UL_{69}	Viktor Malanushenko (born 1955), Ukrainian-American astronomer with the Sloan Digital Sky Survey	JPL · 114027
114094 Irvpatterson	2002 VX_{39}	W. Irwin Patterson (born 1930), American biology professor emeritus at Texas Lutheran University	JPL · 114094
114096 Haroldbier	2002 VA_{40}	Harold D. Bier (born 1931), chemistry professor emeritus at Texas Lutheran University	JPL · 114096

== 114101–114200 ==
back to top

Named minor planet	Provisional	This minor planet was named for...	Ref · Catalog
114156 Eamonlittle	2002 VH_{68}	Eamon Little (1966–2006) was an Irish astronomer at Queen's University, Belfast, and a friend and colleague of astronomers Alan Fitzsimmons and Iwan P. Williams who discovered this minor planet	JPL · 114156

== 114201–114300 ==
back to top

Named minor planet	Provisional	This minor planet was named for...	Ref · Catalog
114239 Bermarmi	2002 WN	Bernard Young (1911–1988), Mary Young (1912–1996), and Michael Young (born 1937), parents and brother of American discoverer James Whitney Young	JPL · 114239

== 114301–114400 ==
back to top

Named minor planet	Provisional	This minor planet was named for...	Ref · Catalog
There are no named minor planets in this number range

== 114401–114500 ==
back to top

Named minor planet	Provisional	This minor planet was named for...	Ref · Catalog
There are no named minor planets in this number range

== 114501–114600 ==
back to top

Named minor planet	Provisional	This minor planet was named for...	Ref · Catalog
There are no named minor planets in this number range

== 114601–114700 ==
back to top

Named minor planet	Provisional	This minor planet was named for...	Ref · Catalog
114608 Emanuelepace	2003 DC_{7}	Emanuele Pace (born 1964), an Italian professor of astronomy and astrophysics at the University of Florence and the director of its Chianti Observatory. He is also a project manager with ESA's ARIEL space telescope that will study explanetary atmospheres. The asteroid's name was suggested by CINEOS astronomer Mario Di Martino.	IAU · 114608
114611 Valeriobocci	2003 DE_{9}	Valerio Bocci (born 1966), is an Italian Physicist, senior technologist at INFN Roma. He has been involved in the DELPHI at LEP (CERN), KLOE experiment of DAFNE Frascati National Laboratory, in the ATLAS and LHCb experiments at LHC CERN. He was one of the first in the scientific literature to propose and demonstrate the possibility to use Field Programmable Gate Array in radiation environment.	IAU · 114611
114612 Sandrasavaglio	2003 DV_{12}	Sandra Savaglio (born 1967) is a physicist and a leading researchers on γ-ray bursts. She has taught at Johns Hopkins University in Baltimore, and at the Max Planck Institute in Germany. Savaglio is currently teaching astronomy at the University of Calabria.	IAU · 114612
114613 Antoninobrosio	2003 DS_{15}	Antonino Brosio (born 1987) is a structural engineer, and the founder and director of the first public observatory and astronomical park in Calabria. He has carried out several national and international collaborations involving the Calabrian schools, and is the discoverer of some variable stars and extragalactic supernovae.	IAU · 114613
114649 Jeanneacker	2003 EN_{52}	Jeanne Christophe (née Acker), the mother of French astronomer Bernard Christophe, who discovered this minor planet	JPL · 114649
114659 Sajnovics	2003 FJ_{7}	János Sajnovics (1733–1785), Hungarian linguist and Jesuit	JPL · 114659
114689 Tomstevens	2003 FJ_{84}	Tom Stevens (born 1933) and his wife Dixie (born 1938), American benefactors and advisors of the George Observatory in Needville, Texas.	JPL · 114689

== 114701–114800 ==
back to top

Named minor planet	Provisional	This minor planet was named for...	Ref · Catalog
114703 North Dakota	2003 FA_{120}	North Dakota, the 39th U.S. state	JPL · 114703
114705 Tamayo	2003 FP_{124}	Arnaldo Tamayo Méndez (born 1942) was the first person of African ancestry and the first Latin American to travel into space as a Cuban cosmonaut on the crew of Soyuz 38 in September 1980. He received the first Hero of the Republic of Cuba medal and many other honors.	JPL · 114705
114725 Gordonwalker	2003 GW_{36}	Gordon A. H. Walker (born 1936), professor emeritus at the University of British Columbia	JPL · 114725
114735 Irenemagni	2003 HP_{9}	Irene Magni (born 1976), a business consultant and fiancée of Italian astronomer Fabrizio Bernardi who discovered this minor planet.	IAU · 114735
114738 Melissa	2003 HQ_{12}	Melissa Palomba (b. 2009), the eldest daughter of Ernesto Palomba, one of the CINEOS observers.	IAU · 114738
114739 Tripodi	2003 HR_{12}	Antonella Tripodi (b. 1986), an Italian amateur astronomer.	IAU · 114739
114740 Luigitatto	2003 HB_{14}	Luigi Tatto (1922–2003), an Italian writer.	IAU · 114740

== 114801–114900 ==
back to top

Named minor planet	Provisional	This minor planet was named for...	Ref · Catalog
114828 Ricoromita	2003 OL_{20}	Enrico Romita (born 1963), Italian software developer on Solar System dynamics, specialized on structural automatic computation	JPL · 114828
114829 Chierchia	2003 OC_{21}	Luigi Chierchia (born 1957), Italian professor of mathematical analysis, and recipient of the 1995 prize of the Institut Henri Poincaré	JPL · 114829

== 114901–115000 ==
back to top

Named minor planet	Provisional	This minor planet was named for...	Ref · Catalog
114987 Tittel	2003 QW_{68}	Pál Tittel (1784–1831), Hungarian astronomer and professor	JPL · 114987
114990 Szeidl	2003 QV_{69}	Béla Szeidl (born 1938), Hungarian astronomer, director of the Konkoly Observatory from 1974 to 1996. and president of IAU Commission 27 (Variable Stars, 1985–1988)	JPL · 114990
114991 Balázs	2003 QY_{69}	Lajos G. Balázs (born 1941), Hungarian astronomer, director of the Konkoly Observatory since 1996) and co-discoverer of supernova 1969B	JPL · 114991

back to top

Preceded by 113,001–114,000	Meanings of minor-planet names List of minor planets: 114,001–115,000	Succeeded by 115,001–116,000
