= List of minor planets: 114001–115000 =

The following is a partial list of minor planets, running from minor-planet number 114001 through 115000, inclusive. The primary data for this and other partial lists is based on JPL's "Small-Body Orbital Elements" and data available from the Minor Planet Center. Critical list information is also provided by the MPC, unless otherwise specified from Lowell Observatory. A detailed description of the table's columns and additional sources are given on the main page including a complete list of every page in this series, and a statistical break-up on the dynamical classification of minor planets.

Also see the summary list of all named bodies in numerical and alphabetical order, and the corresponding naming citations for the number range of this particular list. New namings may only be added to this list after official publication, as the preannouncement of names is condemned by the Working Group for Small Bodies Nomenclature of the International Astronomical Union.

Near-Earth obj.	MBA (inner)	MBA (outer)	Centaur
Mars-crosser	MBA (middle)	Jupiter trojan	Trans-Neptunian obj.
Unclassified

== 114001–114100 ==
Designation			Discovery			Properties		Ref
Permanent	Provisional	Named after	Date	Site	Discoverer(s)	Category	Diam.	Ref
114001	2002 UT_{33}	—	October 31, 2002	Palomar	NEAT	·	3.4 km	MPC · JPL
114002	2002 UP_{34}	—	October 31, 2002	Kvistaberg	Uppsala-DLR Asteroid Survey	BAP	1.9 km	MPC · JPL
114003	2002 UZ_{34}	—	October 31, 2002	Socorro	LINEAR	·	3.9 km	MPC · JPL
114004	2002 UF_{36}	—	October 31, 2002	Anderson Mesa	LONEOS	·	950 m	MPC · JPL
114005	2002 UQ_{36}	—	October 31, 2002	Anderson Mesa	LONEOS	·	2.9 km	MPC · JPL
114006	2002 UC_{38}	—	October 31, 2002	Anderson Mesa	LONEOS	·	3.7 km	MPC · JPL
114007	2002 UO_{38}	—	October 31, 2002	Anderson Mesa	LONEOS	CYB	8.3 km	MPC · JPL
114008	2002 UG_{39}	—	October 31, 2002	Palomar	NEAT	·	2.5 km	MPC · JPL
114009	2002 UH_{39}	—	October 31, 2002	Palomar	NEAT	·	1.3 km	MPC · JPL
114010	2002 UD_{40}	—	October 31, 2002	Socorro	LINEAR	·	3.8 km	MPC · JPL
114011	2002 UG_{40}	—	October 31, 2002	Socorro	LINEAR	·	3.9 km	MPC · JPL
114012	2002 UH_{40}	—	October 31, 2002	Socorro	LINEAR	·	5.7 km	MPC · JPL
114013	2002 UJ_{40}	—	October 31, 2002	Socorro	LINEAR	TEL	3.3 km	MPC · JPL
114014	2002 UL_{40}	—	October 31, 2002	Socorro	LINEAR	EOS	3.4 km	MPC · JPL
114015	2002 UW_{40}	—	October 31, 2002	Anderson Mesa	LONEOS	·	1.8 km	MPC · JPL
114016	2002 UY_{40}	—	October 31, 2002	Palomar	NEAT	·	5.4 km	MPC · JPL
114017	2002 UG_{41}	—	October 31, 2002	Palomar	NEAT	·	3.6 km	MPC · JPL
114018	2002 UJ_{42}	—	October 30, 2002	Kitt Peak	Spacewatch	·	4.7 km	MPC · JPL
114019	2002 UC_{45}	—	October 31, 2002	Socorro	LINEAR	EOS	4.2 km	MPC · JPL
114020	2002 US_{46}	—	October 31, 2002	Socorro	LINEAR	·	6.1 km	MPC · JPL
114021	2002 US_{49}	—	October 31, 2002	Anderson Mesa	LONEOS	·	1.0 km	MPC · JPL
114022 Bizyaev	2002 UZ_{51}	Bizyaev	October 29, 2002	Apache Point	SDSS	EUN	2.0 km	MPC · JPL
114023 Harvanek	2002 UL_{52}	Harvanek	October 29, 2002	Apache Point	SDSS	·	3.3 km	MPC · JPL
114024 Scotkleinman	2002 UB_{62}	Scotkleinman	October 30, 2002	Apache Point	SDSS	GEF	2.0 km	MPC · JPL
114025 Krzesinski	2002 UC_{63}	Krzesinski	October 30, 2002	Apache Point	SDSS	·	4.7 km	MPC · JPL
114026 Emalanushenko	2002 UO_{64}	Emalanushenko	October 30, 2002	Apache Point	SDSS	·	4.3 km	MPC · JPL
114027 Malanushenko	2002 UL_{69}	Malanushenko	October 30, 2002	Apache Point	SDSS	·	3.9 km	MPC · JPL
114028	2002 VK_{3}	—	November 1, 2002	Palomar	NEAT	·	3.1 km	MPC · JPL
114029	2002 VM_{3}	—	November 1, 2002	Palomar	NEAT	·	2.2 km	MPC · JPL
114030	2002 VD_{7}	—	November 2, 2002	Kvistaberg	Uppsala-DLR Asteroid Survey	·	4.0 km	MPC · JPL
114031	2002 VL_{7}	—	November 4, 2002	Haleakala	NEAT	·	4.2 km	MPC · JPL
114032	2002 VM_{7}	—	November 4, 2002	Haleakala	NEAT	·	1.8 km	MPC · JPL
114033	2002 VX_{7}	—	November 1, 2002	Palomar	NEAT	·	4.9 km	MPC · JPL
114034	2002 VO_{8}	—	November 1, 2002	Palomar	NEAT	·	1.5 km	MPC · JPL
114035	2002 VX_{8}	—	November 1, 2002	Palomar	NEAT	·	6.8 km	MPC · JPL
114036	2002 VK_{9}	—	November 1, 2002	Palomar	NEAT	·	5.4 km	MPC · JPL
114037	2002 VH_{10}	—	November 1, 2002	Palomar	NEAT	PHO	1.8 km	MPC · JPL
114038	2002 VN_{10}	—	November 1, 2002	Palomar	NEAT	·	2.4 km	MPC · JPL
114039	2002 VV_{10}	—	November 1, 2002	Palomar	NEAT	·	1.6 km	MPC · JPL
114040	2002 VY_{10}	—	November 1, 2002	Palomar	NEAT	NYS	2.1 km	MPC · JPL
114041	2002 VM_{11}	—	November 1, 2002	Palomar	NEAT	fast	1.8 km	MPC · JPL
114042	2002 VV_{11}	—	November 1, 2002	Palomar	NEAT	·	3.3 km	MPC · JPL
114043	2002 VO_{12}	—	November 4, 2002	Anderson Mesa	LONEOS	HYG	5.1 km	MPC · JPL
114044	2002 VY_{14}	—	November 6, 2002	Needville	Needville	HYG	5.5 km	MPC · JPL
114045	2002 VC_{15}	—	November 5, 2002	Anderson Mesa	LONEOS	·	1.4 km	MPC · JPL
114046	2002 VN_{16}	—	November 5, 2002	Socorro	LINEAR	EOS	3.3 km	MPC · JPL
114047	2002 VT_{16}	—	November 5, 2002	Socorro	LINEAR	·	5.3 km	MPC · JPL
114048	2002 VC_{17}	—	November 5, 2002	Socorro	LINEAR	ERI	6.1 km	MPC · JPL
114049	2002 VD_{17}	—	November 5, 2002	Socorro	LINEAR	·	2.5 km	MPC · JPL
114050	2002 VT_{18}	—	November 4, 2002	Anderson Mesa	LONEOS	·	5.7 km	MPC · JPL
114051	2002 VY_{18}	—	November 4, 2002	Palomar	NEAT	·	3.6 km	MPC · JPL
114052	2002 VA_{19}	—	November 4, 2002	Palomar	NEAT	·	3.3 km	MPC · JPL
114053	2002 VD_{19}	—	November 4, 2002	Palomar	NEAT	·	1.6 km	MPC · JPL
114054	2002 VV_{19}	—	November 4, 2002	Kitt Peak	Spacewatch	·	3.4 km	MPC · JPL
114055	2002 VG_{20}	—	November 4, 2002	Haleakala	NEAT	·	1.1 km	MPC · JPL
114056	2002 VG_{21}	—	November 5, 2002	Socorro	LINEAR	·	1.6 km	MPC · JPL
114057	2002 VR_{21}	—	November 5, 2002	Socorro	LINEAR	·	1.6 km	MPC · JPL
114058	2002 VX_{22}	—	November 5, 2002	Socorro	LINEAR	·	1.9 km	MPC · JPL
114059	2002 VW_{23}	—	November 5, 2002	Socorro	LINEAR	·	1.8 km	MPC · JPL
114060	2002 VP_{24}	—	November 5, 2002	Socorro	LINEAR	·	1.4 km	MPC · JPL
114061	2002 VQ_{24}	—	November 5, 2002	Socorro	LINEAR	·	4.4 km	MPC · JPL
114062	2002 VF_{25}	—	November 5, 2002	Socorro	LINEAR	·	2.5 km	MPC · JPL
114063	2002 VS_{25}	—	November 5, 2002	Socorro	LINEAR	HYG	6.3 km	MPC · JPL
114064	2002 VD_{26}	—	November 5, 2002	Socorro	LINEAR	·	2.0 km	MPC · JPL
114065	2002 VO_{26}	—	November 5, 2002	Socorro	LINEAR	·	5.3 km	MPC · JPL
114066	2002 VN_{28}	—	November 5, 2002	Anderson Mesa	LONEOS	·	4.8 km	MPC · JPL
114067	2002 VA_{29}	—	November 5, 2002	Anderson Mesa	LONEOS	·	4.8 km	MPC · JPL
114068	2002 VT_{29}	—	November 5, 2002	Socorro	LINEAR	·	2.5 km	MPC · JPL
114069	2002 VB_{30}	—	November 5, 2002	Socorro	LINEAR	·	3.9 km	MPC · JPL
114070	2002 VG_{30}	—	November 5, 2002	Socorro	LINEAR	·	1.4 km	MPC · JPL
114071	2002 VC_{32}	—	November 5, 2002	Socorro	LINEAR	V	1.5 km	MPC · JPL
114072	2002 VW_{32}	—	November 5, 2002	Socorro	LINEAR	HYG	7.1 km	MPC · JPL
114073	2002 VC_{33}	—	November 5, 2002	Socorro	LINEAR	·	3.6 km	MPC · JPL
114074	2002 VF_{33}	—	November 5, 2002	Socorro	LINEAR	·	4.2 km	MPC · JPL
114075	2002 VG_{33}	—	November 5, 2002	Socorro	LINEAR	·	1.2 km	MPC · JPL
114076	2002 VJ_{33}	—	November 5, 2002	Socorro	LINEAR	·	2.7 km	MPC · JPL
114077	2002 VM_{33}	—	November 5, 2002	Socorro	LINEAR	·	2.2 km	MPC · JPL
114078	2002 VO_{33}	—	November 5, 2002	Socorro	LINEAR	·	2.3 km	MPC · JPL
114079	2002 VX_{33}	—	November 5, 2002	Socorro	LINEAR	·	5.9 km	MPC · JPL
114080	2002 VK_{34}	—	November 5, 2002	Socorro	LINEAR	·	4.9 km	MPC · JPL
114081	2002 VO_{34}	—	November 5, 2002	Socorro	LINEAR	·	2.5 km	MPC · JPL
114082	2002 VF_{35}	—	November 5, 2002	Socorro	LINEAR	ADE	4.7 km	MPC · JPL
114083	2002 VS_{35}	—	November 5, 2002	Kitt Peak	Spacewatch	·	6.9 km	MPC · JPL
114084	2002 VT_{35}	—	November 5, 2002	Socorro	LINEAR	KOR	3.1 km	MPC · JPL
114085	2002 VW_{35}	—	November 5, 2002	Socorro	LINEAR	·	2.2 km	MPC · JPL
114086	2002 VG_{36}	—	November 5, 2002	Socorro	LINEAR	·	3.2 km	MPC · JPL
114087	2002 VJ_{36}	—	November 5, 2002	Socorro	LINEAR	·	1.6 km	MPC · JPL
114088	2002 VQ_{36}	—	November 5, 2002	Anderson Mesa	LONEOS	·	1.0 km	MPC · JPL
114089	2002 VJ_{38}	—	November 5, 2002	Socorro	LINEAR	·	3.0 km	MPC · JPL
114090	2002 VM_{38}	—	November 5, 2002	Socorro	LINEAR	·	1.0 km	MPC · JPL
114091	2002 VQ_{38}	—	November 5, 2002	Socorro	LINEAR	·	3.0 km	MPC · JPL
114092	2002 VM_{39}	—	November 5, 2002	Socorro	LINEAR	·	6.3 km	MPC · JPL
114093	2002 VO_{39}	—	November 5, 2002	Socorro	LINEAR	·	1.7 km	MPC · JPL
114094 Irvpatterson	2002 VX_{39}	Irvpatterson	November 6, 2002	Kingsnake	J. V. McClusky	VER	5.8 km	MPC · JPL
114095	2002 VY_{39}	—	November 6, 2002	Socorro	LINEAR	·	4.3 km	MPC · JPL
114096 Haroldbier	2002 VA_{40}	Haroldbier	November 8, 2002	Kingsnake	J. V. McClusky	·	1.3 km	MPC · JPL
114097	2002 VB_{40}	—	November 8, 2002	Kingsnake	J. V. McClusky	PHO	2.4 km	MPC · JPL
114098	2002 VJ_{40}	—	November 5, 2002	Socorro	LINEAR	·	2.7 km	MPC · JPL
114099	2002 VN_{40}	—	November 5, 2002	Haleakala	NEAT	·	1.5 km	MPC · JPL
114100	2002 VG_{41}	—	November 4, 2002	Palomar	NEAT	·	2.0 km	MPC · JPL

== 114101–114200 ==
back to top

Designation			Discovery			Properties		Ref
Permanent	Provisional	Named after	Date	Site	Discoverer(s)	Category	Diam.	Ref
114101	2002 VU_{41}	—	November 5, 2002	Palomar	NEAT	NYS	2.0 km	MPC · JPL
114102	2002 VZ_{41}	—	November 5, 2002	Palomar	NEAT	·	4.7 km	MPC · JPL
114103	2002 VA_{42}	—	November 5, 2002	Palomar	NEAT	V	1.5 km	MPC · JPL
114104	2002 VH_{42}	—	November 5, 2002	Palomar	NEAT	·	1.2 km	MPC · JPL
114105	2002 VQ_{42}	—	November 6, 2002	Socorro	LINEAR	·	3.4 km	MPC · JPL
114106	2002 VW_{43}	—	November 4, 2002	Kitt Peak	Spacewatch	·	3.0 km	MPC · JPL
114107	2002 VK_{44}	—	November 4, 2002	Haleakala	NEAT	·	2.3 km	MPC · JPL
114108	2002 VR_{44}	—	November 4, 2002	Haleakala	NEAT	·	4.4 km	MPC · JPL
114109	2002 VS_{45}	—	November 5, 2002	Palomar	NEAT	·	2.8 km	MPC · JPL
114110	2002 VF_{47}	—	November 5, 2002	Anderson Mesa	LONEOS	EUN	3.3 km	MPC · JPL
114111	2002 VL_{47}	—	November 5, 2002	Anderson Mesa	LONEOS	·	2.2 km	MPC · JPL
114112	2002 VR_{47}	—	November 5, 2002	Socorro	LINEAR	·	1.4 km	MPC · JPL
114113	2002 VS_{47}	—	November 5, 2002	Socorro	LINEAR	V	1.3 km	MPC · JPL
114114	2002 VD_{48}	—	November 5, 2002	Socorro	LINEAR	·	8.4 km	MPC · JPL
114115	2002 VK_{48}	—	November 5, 2002	Socorro	LINEAR	·	2.4 km	MPC · JPL
114116	2002 VT_{48}	—	November 5, 2002	Anderson Mesa	LONEOS	·	2.6 km	MPC · JPL
114117	2002 VX_{48}	—	November 5, 2002	Anderson Mesa	LONEOS	·	5.3 km	MPC · JPL
114118	2002 VC_{49}	—	November 5, 2002	Anderson Mesa	LONEOS	·	1.4 km	MPC · JPL
114119	2002 VH_{49}	—	November 5, 2002	Anderson Mesa	LONEOS	·	2.9 km	MPC · JPL
114120	2002 VJ_{49}	—	November 5, 2002	Anderson Mesa	LONEOS	·	7.7 km	MPC · JPL
114121	2002 VU_{49}	—	November 5, 2002	Anderson Mesa	LONEOS	·	2.0 km	MPC · JPL
114122	2002 VW_{49}	—	November 5, 2002	Anderson Mesa	LONEOS	(2076)	1.4 km	MPC · JPL
114123	2002 VX_{49}	—	November 5, 2002	Anderson Mesa	LONEOS	·	2.4 km	MPC · JPL
114124	2002 VB_{50}	—	November 5, 2002	Anderson Mesa	LONEOS	·	3.7 km	MPC · JPL
114125	2002 VC_{50}	—	November 5, 2002	Anderson Mesa	LONEOS	·	1.5 km	MPC · JPL
114126	2002 VG_{50}	—	November 5, 2002	Anderson Mesa	LONEOS	·	1.4 km	MPC · JPL
114127	2002 VL_{50}	—	November 5, 2002	Anderson Mesa	LONEOS	·	2.3 km	MPC · JPL
114128	2002 VZ_{50}	—	November 6, 2002	Anderson Mesa	LONEOS	·	3.3 km	MPC · JPL
114129	2002 VC_{51}	—	November 6, 2002	Anderson Mesa	LONEOS	·	2.5 km	MPC · JPL
114130	2002 VZ_{52}	—	November 6, 2002	Socorro	LINEAR	·	1.3 km	MPC · JPL
114131	2002 VE_{53}	—	November 6, 2002	Socorro	LINEAR	·	3.4 km	MPC · JPL
114132	2002 VH_{54}	—	November 6, 2002	Socorro	LINEAR	KOR	2.8 km	MPC · JPL
114133	2002 VM_{55}	—	November 6, 2002	Socorro	LINEAR	·	2.2 km	MPC · JPL
114134	2002 VX_{55}	—	November 6, 2002	Socorro	LINEAR	·	2.0 km	MPC · JPL
114135	2002 VM_{56}	—	November 6, 2002	Anderson Mesa	LONEOS	·	4.3 km	MPC · JPL
114136	2002 VU_{56}	—	November 6, 2002	Socorro	LINEAR	·	8.8 km	MPC · JPL
114137	2002 VM_{57}	—	November 6, 2002	Haleakala	NEAT	·	1.4 km	MPC · JPL
114138	2002 VS_{57}	—	November 6, 2002	Haleakala	NEAT	·	6.8 km	MPC · JPL
114139	2002 VZ_{58}	—	November 7, 2002	Socorro	LINEAR	PHO	4.2 km	MPC · JPL
114140	2002 VF_{59}	—	November 1, 2002	Socorro	LINEAR	GEF	2.5 km	MPC · JPL
114141	2002 VX_{60}	—	November 4, 2002	Haleakala	NEAT	L5	21 km	MPC · JPL
114142	2002 VB_{62}	—	November 5, 2002	Socorro	LINEAR	·	1.2 km	MPC · JPL
114143	2002 VC_{62}	—	November 5, 2002	Socorro	LINEAR	·	5.4 km	MPC · JPL
114144	2002 VK_{62}	—	November 5, 2002	Socorro	LINEAR	·	1.2 km	MPC · JPL
114145	2002 VQ_{62}	—	November 5, 2002	Anderson Mesa	LONEOS	HOF	5.1 km	MPC · JPL
114146	2002 VT_{62}	—	November 5, 2002	Anderson Mesa	LONEOS	V	1.6 km	MPC · JPL
114147	2002 VE_{63}	—	November 6, 2002	Anderson Mesa	LONEOS	·	2.6 km	MPC · JPL
114148	2002 VZ_{63}	—	November 6, 2002	Anderson Mesa	LONEOS	MAR	2.3 km	MPC · JPL
114149	2002 VJ_{64}	—	November 6, 2002	Socorro	LINEAR	PHO	2.1 km	MPC · JPL
114150	2002 VS_{64}	—	November 7, 2002	Anderson Mesa	LONEOS	EUN	2.6 km	MPC · JPL
114151	2002 VD_{65}	—	November 7, 2002	Socorro	LINEAR	TIR	5.1 km	MPC · JPL
114152	2002 VK_{65}	—	November 7, 2002	Socorro	LINEAR	(5)	4.0 km	MPC · JPL
114153	2002 VB_{66}	—	November 7, 2002	Kingsnake	J. V. McClusky	·	1.3 km	MPC · JPL
114154	2002 VB_{67}	—	November 6, 2002	Socorro	LINEAR	NYS	2.8 km	MPC · JPL
114155	2002 VH_{67}	—	November 7, 2002	Socorro	LINEAR	fast	1.5 km	MPC · JPL
114156 Eamonlittle	2002 VH_{68}	Eamonlittle	November 4, 2002	La Palma	A. Fitzsimmons, Williams, I. P.	KOR	2.3 km	MPC · JPL
114157	2002 VO_{68}	—	November 7, 2002	Socorro	LINEAR	·	3.9 km	MPC · JPL
114158	2002 VE_{70}	—	November 7, 2002	Socorro	LINEAR	·	1.4 km	MPC · JPL
114159	2002 VL_{70}	—	November 7, 2002	Socorro	LINEAR	·	1.6 km	MPC · JPL
114160	2002 VO_{70}	—	November 7, 2002	Socorro	LINEAR	·	3.7 km	MPC · JPL
114161	2002 VC_{71}	—	November 7, 2002	Socorro	LINEAR	·	3.7 km	MPC · JPL
114162	2002 VJ_{71}	—	November 7, 2002	Socorro	LINEAR	HYG	7.0 km	MPC · JPL
114163	2002 VR_{71}	—	November 7, 2002	Socorro	LINEAR	·	1.1 km	MPC · JPL
114164	2002 VW_{71}	—	November 7, 2002	Socorro	LINEAR	·	3.1 km	MPC · JPL
114165	2002 VB_{72}	—	November 7, 2002	Socorro	LINEAR	·	2.8 km	MPC · JPL
114166	2002 VW_{72}	—	November 7, 2002	Socorro	LINEAR	·	5.6 km	MPC · JPL
114167	2002 VX_{72}	—	November 7, 2002	Socorro	LINEAR	·	2.6 km	MPC · JPL
114168	2002 VK_{74}	—	November 7, 2002	Socorro	LINEAR	·	3.4 km	MPC · JPL
114169	2002 VT_{74}	—	November 7, 2002	Socorro	LINEAR	·	3.5 km	MPC · JPL
114170	2002 VW_{74}	—	November 7, 2002	Socorro	LINEAR	·	2.5 km	MPC · JPL
114171	2002 VX_{74}	—	November 7, 2002	Socorro	LINEAR	·	3.0 km	MPC · JPL
114172	2002 VB_{75}	—	November 7, 2002	Socorro	LINEAR	·	6.8 km	MPC · JPL
114173	2002 VH_{75}	—	November 7, 2002	Socorro	LINEAR	·	4.1 km	MPC · JPL
114174	2002 VN_{75}	—	November 7, 2002	Socorro	LINEAR	EOS	3.5 km	MPC · JPL
114175	2002 VE_{77}	—	November 7, 2002	Socorro	LINEAR	WIT	1.9 km	MPC · JPL
114176	2002 VK_{77}	—	November 7, 2002	Socorro	LINEAR	·	2.9 km	MPC · JPL
114177	2002 VL_{77}	—	November 7, 2002	Socorro	LINEAR	HYG	4.9 km	MPC · JPL
114178	2002 VE_{78}	—	November 7, 2002	Socorro	LINEAR	·	3.7 km	MPC · JPL
114179	2002 VC_{80}	—	November 7, 2002	Socorro	LINEAR	ADE	5.7 km	MPC · JPL
114180	2002 VE_{80}	—	November 7, 2002	Socorro	LINEAR	·	3.1 km	MPC · JPL
114181	2002 VK_{80}	—	November 7, 2002	Socorro	LINEAR	V	1.5 km	MPC · JPL
114182	2002 VP_{80}	—	November 7, 2002	Socorro	LINEAR	EOS	3.9 km	MPC · JPL
114183	2002 VP_{81}	—	November 7, 2002	Socorro	LINEAR	·	3.0 km	MPC · JPL
114184	2002 VW_{81}	—	November 7, 2002	Socorro	LINEAR	·	2.3 km	MPC · JPL
114185	2002 VA_{82}	—	November 7, 2002	Socorro	LINEAR	·	1.8 km	MPC · JPL
114186	2002 VC_{82}	—	November 7, 2002	Socorro	LINEAR	·	2.9 km	MPC · JPL
114187	2002 VJ_{82}	—	November 7, 2002	Socorro	LINEAR	(3025)	8.9 km	MPC · JPL
114188	2002 VG_{83}	—	November 7, 2002	Socorro	LINEAR	·	1.5 km	MPC · JPL
114189	2002 VX_{83}	—	November 7, 2002	Socorro	LINEAR	·	3.5 km	MPC · JPL
114190	2002 VP_{84}	—	November 7, 2002	Socorro	LINEAR	T_{j} (2.98) · EUP	10 km	MPC · JPL
114191	2002 VQ_{88}	—	November 11, 2002	Socorro	LINEAR	·	1.5 km	MPC · JPL
114192	2002 VH_{89}	—	November 11, 2002	Socorro	LINEAR	·	2.1 km	MPC · JPL
114193	2002 VL_{89}	—	November 11, 2002	Socorro	LINEAR	EUN	3.5 km	MPC · JPL
114194	2002 VW_{89}	—	November 11, 2002	Socorro	LINEAR	·	4.9 km	MPC · JPL
114195	2002 VD_{94}	—	November 12, 2002	Socorro	LINEAR	·	1.1 km	MPC · JPL
114196	2002 VG_{96}	—	November 11, 2002	Anderson Mesa	LONEOS	·	5.6 km	MPC · JPL
114197	2002 VM_{96}	—	November 11, 2002	Socorro	LINEAR	·	1.7 km	MPC · JPL
114198	2002 VE_{97}	—	November 12, 2002	Socorro	LINEAR	·	4.6 km	MPC · JPL
114199	2002 VN_{97}	—	November 12, 2002	Socorro	LINEAR	·	1.1 km	MPC · JPL
114200	2002 VH_{98}	—	November 11, 2002	Socorro	LINEAR	·	3.3 km	MPC · JPL

== 114201–114300 ==
back to top

Designation			Discovery			Properties		Ref
Permanent	Provisional	Named after	Date	Site	Discoverer(s)	Category	Diam.	Ref
114201	2002 VK_{99}	—	November 13, 2002	Socorro	LINEAR	·	3.8 km	MPC · JPL
114202	2002 VD_{100}	—	November 10, 2002	Socorro	LINEAR	HNS	3.9 km	MPC · JPL
114203	2002 VH_{101}	—	November 11, 2002	Socorro	LINEAR	·	2.5 km	MPC · JPL
114204	2002 VU_{103}	—	November 12, 2002	Socorro	LINEAR	·	3.1 km	MPC · JPL
114205	2002 VF_{105}	—	November 12, 2002	Socorro	LINEAR	·	2.0 km	MPC · JPL
114206	2002 VB_{106}	—	November 12, 2002	Socorro	LINEAR	·	2.8 km	MPC · JPL
114207	2002 VD_{106}	—	November 12, 2002	Socorro	LINEAR	·	2.9 km	MPC · JPL
114208	2002 VH_{107}	—	November 12, 2002	Socorro	LINEAR	L5	20 km	MPC · JPL
114209	2002 VL_{107}	—	November 12, 2002	Socorro	LINEAR	(5)	2.4 km	MPC · JPL
114210	2002 VX_{107}	—	November 12, 2002	Socorro	LINEAR	·	5.3 km	MPC · JPL
114211	2002 VE_{108}	—	November 12, 2002	Socorro	LINEAR	·	3.3 km	MPC · JPL
114212	2002 VU_{109}	—	November 12, 2002	Socorro	LINEAR	·	3.1 km	MPC · JPL
114213	2002 VX_{109}	—	November 12, 2002	Socorro	LINEAR	V	1.2 km	MPC · JPL
114214	2002 VA_{110}	—	November 12, 2002	Socorro	LINEAR	·	2.5 km	MPC · JPL
114215	2002 VM_{110}	—	November 12, 2002	Socorro	LINEAR	·	2.4 km	MPC · JPL
114216	2002 VB_{111}	—	November 13, 2002	Palomar	NEAT	·	4.1 km	MPC · JPL
114217	2002 VF_{111}	—	November 13, 2002	Socorro	LINEAR	MAR	3.0 km	MPC · JPL
114218	2002 VN_{111}	—	November 13, 2002	Palomar	NEAT	·	4.4 km	MPC · JPL
114219	2002 VQ_{111}	—	November 13, 2002	Palomar	NEAT	·	1.1 km	MPC · JPL
114220	2002 VJ_{112}	—	November 13, 2002	Socorro	LINEAR	V	1.2 km	MPC · JPL
114221	2002 VM_{112}	—	November 13, 2002	Palomar	NEAT	·	4.4 km	MPC · JPL
114222	2002 VZ_{112}	—	November 13, 2002	Palomar	NEAT	·	1.8 km	MPC · JPL
114223	2002 VJ_{113}	—	November 13, 2002	Palomar	NEAT	·	5.0 km	MPC · JPL
114224	2002 VZ_{113}	—	November 13, 2002	Palomar	NEAT	·	1.4 km	MPC · JPL
114225	2002 VE_{114}	—	November 13, 2002	Palomar	NEAT	HYG	4.6 km	MPC · JPL
114226	2002 VQ_{115}	—	November 11, 2002	Socorro	LINEAR	·	2.2 km	MPC · JPL
114227	2002 VK_{116}	—	November 12, 2002	Socorro	LINEAR	V	1.5 km	MPC · JPL
114228	2002 VV_{116}	—	November 13, 2002	Palomar	NEAT	·	3.6 km	MPC · JPL
114229	2002 VB_{118}	—	November 13, 2002	Socorro	LINEAR	·	5.6 km	MPC · JPL
114230	2002 VW_{118}	—	November 12, 2002	Socorro	LINEAR	·	1.7 km	MPC · JPL
114231	2002 VB_{122}	—	November 13, 2002	Kitt Peak	Spacewatch	·	3.7 km	MPC · JPL
114232	2002 VV_{123}	—	November 14, 2002	Socorro	LINEAR	·	2.2 km	MPC · JPL
114233	2002 VE_{124}	—	November 14, 2002	Palomar	NEAT	·	2.1 km	MPC · JPL
114234	2002 VO_{124}	—	November 11, 2002	Socorro	LINEAR	·	4.4 km	MPC · JPL
114235	2002 VZ_{133}	—	November 6, 2002	Anderson Mesa	LONEOS	fast	1.6 km	MPC · JPL
114236	2002 VJ_{134}	—	November 6, 2002	Anderson Mesa	LONEOS	·	7.0 km	MPC · JPL
114237	2002 VE_{135}	—	November 7, 2002	Socorro	LINEAR	·	7.9 km	MPC · JPL
114238	2002 WC	—	November 16, 2002	Socorro	LINEAR	HNS	3.6 km	MPC · JPL
114239 Bermarmi	2002 WN	Bermarmi	November 21, 2002	Wrightwood	J. W. Young	·	3.5 km	MPC · JPL
114240	2002 WH_{3}	—	November 24, 2002	Palomar	NEAT	V	1.2 km	MPC · JPL
114241	2002 WJ_{4}	—	November 24, 2002	Palomar	NEAT	·	4.6 km	MPC · JPL
114242	2002 WU_{5}	—	November 23, 2002	Palomar	NEAT	·	6.3 km	MPC · JPL
114243	2002 WZ_{5}	—	November 24, 2002	Palomar	NEAT	VER	9.1 km	MPC · JPL
114244	2002 WS_{8}	—	November 24, 2002	Palomar	NEAT	·	5.1 km	MPC · JPL
114245	2002 WN_{9}	—	November 24, 2002	Palomar	NEAT	EOS	3.3 km	MPC · JPL
114246	2002 WS_{9}	—	November 24, 2002	Palomar	NEAT	·	1.8 km	MPC · JPL
114247	2002 WY_{10}	—	November 25, 2002	Palomar	NEAT	V	1.1 km	MPC · JPL
114248	2002 WL_{11}	—	November 26, 2002	Kitt Peak	Spacewatch	·	6.5 km	MPC · JPL
114249	2002 WO_{11}	—	November 24, 2002	Palomar	NEAT	·	3.9 km	MPC · JPL
114250	2002 WJ_{14}	—	November 28, 2002	Anderson Mesa	LONEOS	·	1.3 km	MPC · JPL
114251	2002 WP_{14}	—	November 28, 2002	Anderson Mesa	LONEOS	·	5.2 km	MPC · JPL
114252	2002 WD_{15}	—	November 28, 2002	Anderson Mesa	LONEOS	·	1.5 km	MPC · JPL
114253	2002 WZ_{15}	—	November 28, 2002	Anderson Mesa	LONEOS	MAR	2.5 km	MPC · JPL
114254	2002 WD_{16}	—	November 28, 2002	Haleakala	NEAT	AGN	2.4 km	MPC · JPL
114255	2002 WG_{16}	—	November 28, 2002	Haleakala	NEAT	·	4.8 km	MPC · JPL
114256	2002 WO_{16}	—	November 28, 2002	Haleakala	NEAT	·	5.1 km	MPC · JPL
114257	2002 WP_{16}	—	November 28, 2002	Haleakala	NEAT	·	2.4 km	MPC · JPL
114258	2002 WQ_{16}	—	November 28, 2002	Haleakala	NEAT	·	3.0 km	MPC · JPL
114259	2002 WR_{16}	—	November 28, 2002	Haleakala	NEAT	EOS	3.7 km	MPC · JPL
114260	2002 WB_{17}	—	November 28, 2002	Haleakala	NEAT	·	4.6 km	MPC · JPL
114261	2002 WC_{17}	—	November 28, 2002	Haleakala	NEAT	·	2.6 km	MPC · JPL
114262	2002 XH	—	December 1, 2002	Socorro	LINEAR	·	4.1 km	MPC · JPL
114263	2002 XV_{1}	—	December 1, 2002	Socorro	LINEAR	(5)	1.9 km	MPC · JPL
114264	2002 XH_{2}	—	December 1, 2002	Socorro	LINEAR	·	1.5 km	MPC · JPL
114265	2002 XQ_{2}	—	December 1, 2002	Socorro	LINEAR	·	3.7 km	MPC · JPL
114266	2002 XK_{5}	—	December 1, 2002	Socorro	LINEAR	·	3.6 km	MPC · JPL
114267	2002 XM_{5}	—	December 1, 2002	Socorro	LINEAR	·	1.4 km	MPC · JPL
114268	2002 XP_{5}	—	December 1, 2002	Socorro	LINEAR	·	4.8 km	MPC · JPL
114269	2002 XG_{6}	—	December 1, 2002	Socorro	LINEAR	·	3.5 km	MPC · JPL
114270	2002 XP_{6}	—	December 1, 2002	Haleakala	NEAT	·	1.2 km	MPC · JPL
114271	2002 XZ_{8}	—	December 2, 2002	Socorro	LINEAR	·	1.5 km	MPC · JPL
114272	2002 XR_{13}	—	December 3, 2002	Palomar	NEAT	·	4.1 km	MPC · JPL
114273	2002 XJ_{14}	—	December 5, 2002	Socorro	LINEAR	·	1.2 km	MPC · JPL
114274	2002 XL_{15}	—	December 2, 2002	Socorro	LINEAR	·	3.6 km	MPC · JPL
114275	2002 XR_{16}	—	December 3, 2002	Palomar	NEAT	·	4.7 km	MPC · JPL
114276	2002 XP_{17}	—	December 5, 2002	Socorro	LINEAR	·	2.9 km	MPC · JPL
114277	2002 XS_{18}	—	December 5, 2002	Socorro	LINEAR	·	4.9 km	MPC · JPL
114278	2002 XV_{18}	—	December 5, 2002	Socorro	LINEAR	·	8.5 km	MPC · JPL
114279	2002 XY_{19}	—	December 2, 2002	Socorro	LINEAR	·	3.7 km	MPC · JPL
114280	2002 XW_{21}	—	December 2, 2002	Socorro	LINEAR	·	1.7 km	MPC · JPL
114281	2002 XX_{21}	—	December 2, 2002	Socorro	LINEAR	V	1.8 km	MPC · JPL
114282	2002 XR_{23}	—	December 5, 2002	Socorro	LINEAR	·	1.3 km	MPC · JPL
114283	2002 XD_{24}	—	December 5, 2002	Socorro	LINEAR	·	2.4 km	MPC · JPL
114284	2002 XE_{25}	—	December 5, 2002	Socorro	LINEAR	·	1.3 km	MPC · JPL
114285	2002 XG_{25}	—	December 5, 2002	Socorro	LINEAR	·	2.0 km	MPC · JPL
114286	2002 XM_{25}	—	December 5, 2002	Socorro	LINEAR	·	5.0 km	MPC · JPL
114287	2002 XP_{25}	—	December 5, 2002	Socorro	LINEAR	·	2.9 km	MPC · JPL
114288	2002 XH_{27}	—	December 5, 2002	Socorro	LINEAR	·	3.5 km	MPC · JPL
114289	2002 XG_{28}	—	December 5, 2002	Fountain Hills	Hills, Fountain	·	1.9 km	MPC · JPL
114290	2002 XO_{28}	—	December 5, 2002	Socorro	LINEAR	·	3.3 km	MPC · JPL
114291	2002 XG_{29}	—	December 5, 2002	Kitt Peak	Spacewatch	EOS	3.7 km	MPC · JPL
114292	2002 XQ_{29}	—	December 5, 2002	Palomar	NEAT	V	1.4 km	MPC · JPL
114293	2002 XW_{29}	—	December 5, 2002	Socorro	LINEAR	·	7.0 km	MPC · JPL
114294	2002 XY_{29}	—	December 5, 2002	Socorro	LINEAR	EUN	4.1 km	MPC · JPL
114295	2002 XP_{30}	—	December 6, 2002	Socorro	LINEAR	EOS	3.5 km	MPC · JPL
114296	2002 XO_{31}	—	December 6, 2002	Socorro	LINEAR	·	5.9 km	MPC · JPL
114297	2002 XC_{32}	—	December 6, 2002	Socorro	LINEAR	V	1.4 km	MPC · JPL
114298	2002 XH_{34}	—	December 5, 2002	Socorro	LINEAR	·	2.1 km	MPC · JPL
114299	2002 XL_{37}	—	December 9, 2002	Tebbutt	F. B. Zoltowski	·	2.0 km	MPC · JPL
114300	2002 XE_{41}	—	December 6, 2002	Socorro	LINEAR	·	3.6 km	MPC · JPL

== 114301–114400 ==
back to top

Designation			Discovery			Properties		Ref
Permanent	Provisional	Named after	Date	Site	Discoverer(s)	Category	Diam.	Ref
114301	2002 XX_{42}	—	December 8, 2002	Haleakala	NEAT	·	1.8 km	MPC · JPL
114302	2002 XO_{46}	—	December 7, 2002	Socorro	LINEAR	·	2.5 km	MPC · JPL
114303	2002 XU_{46}	—	December 7, 2002	Socorro	LINEAR	NYS	2.0 km	MPC · JPL
114304	2002 XA_{47}	—	December 8, 2002	Haleakala	NEAT	·	2.6 km	MPC · JPL
114305	2002 XY_{47}	—	December 10, 2002	Socorro	LINEAR	·	1.4 km	MPC · JPL
114306	2002 XT_{48}	—	December 10, 2002	Socorro	LINEAR	·	3.6 km	MPC · JPL
114307	2002 XV_{49}	—	December 10, 2002	Socorro	LINEAR	·	2.0 km	MPC · JPL
114308	2002 XY_{50}	—	December 10, 2002	Socorro	LINEAR	SUL	4.1 km	MPC · JPL
114309	2002 XN_{52}	—	December 10, 2002	Socorro	LINEAR	·	1.2 km	MPC · JPL
114310	2002 XQ_{52}	—	December 10, 2002	Socorro	LINEAR	·	5.2 km	MPC · JPL
114311	2002 XY_{52}	—	December 10, 2002	Socorro	LINEAR	·	1.8 km	MPC · JPL
114312	2002 XB_{53}	—	December 10, 2002	Socorro	LINEAR	·	2.4 km	MPC · JPL
114313	2002 XD_{53}	—	December 10, 2002	Socorro	LINEAR	EOS	3.6 km	MPC · JPL
114314	2002 XX_{53}	—	December 10, 2002	Palomar	NEAT	·	5.8 km	MPC · JPL
114315	2002 XD_{56}	—	December 8, 2002	Haleakala	NEAT	·	4.6 km	MPC · JPL
114316	2002 XV_{56}	—	December 10, 2002	Socorro	LINEAR	·	2.3 km	MPC · JPL
114317	2002 XE_{57}	—	December 10, 2002	Palomar	NEAT	·	2.3 km	MPC · JPL
114318	2002 XO_{57}	—	December 10, 2002	Palomar	NEAT	·	2.5 km	MPC · JPL
114319	2002 XD_{58}	—	December 11, 2002	Socorro	LINEAR	moon	1.7 km	MPC · JPL
114320	2002 XJ_{58}	—	December 11, 2002	Socorro	LINEAR	·	1.5 km	MPC · JPL
114321	2002 XP_{58}	—	December 11, 2002	Socorro	LINEAR	·	1.8 km	MPC · JPL
114322	2002 XW_{58}	—	December 11, 2002	Socorro	LINEAR	·	6.0 km	MPC · JPL
114323	2002 XJ_{59}	—	December 9, 2002	Kitt Peak	Spacewatch	·	4.2 km	MPC · JPL
114324	2002 XK_{59}	—	December 10, 2002	Socorro	LINEAR	EOS	3.0 km	MPC · JPL
114325	2002 XM_{59}	—	December 12, 2002	Nogales	P. R. Holvorcem, M. Schwartz	V	1.2 km	MPC · JPL
114326	2002 XO_{59}	—	December 11, 2002	Socorro	LINEAR	·	3.0 km	MPC · JPL
114327	2002 XB_{63}	—	December 11, 2002	Socorro	LINEAR	·	3.5 km	MPC · JPL
114328	2002 XE_{63}	—	December 11, 2002	Socorro	LINEAR	·	1.5 km	MPC · JPL
114329	2002 XG_{63}	—	December 11, 2002	Socorro	LINEAR	NYS	1.8 km	MPC · JPL
114330	2002 XR_{63}	—	December 11, 2002	Socorro	LINEAR	·	2.8 km	MPC · JPL
114331	2002 XL_{64}	—	December 11, 2002	Socorro	LINEAR	V	1.3 km	MPC · JPL
114332	2002 XX_{64}	—	December 11, 2002	Socorro	LINEAR	V	1.6 km	MPC · JPL
114333	2002 XP_{65}	—	December 12, 2002	Socorro	LINEAR	·	5.3 km	MPC · JPL
114334	2002 XW_{65}	—	December 12, 2002	Socorro	LINEAR	slow	4.5 km	MPC · JPL
114335	2002 XX_{65}	—	December 12, 2002	Socorro	LINEAR	PHO	3.8 km	MPC · JPL
114336	2002 XT_{66}	—	December 10, 2002	Socorro	LINEAR	·	2.2 km	MPC · JPL
114337	2002 XY_{67}	—	December 11, 2002	Palomar	NEAT	·	3.6 km	MPC · JPL
114338	2002 XQ_{68}	—	December 12, 2002	Haleakala	NEAT	·	1.4 km	MPC · JPL
114339	2002 XR_{68}	—	December 12, 2002	Haleakala	NEAT	·	6.9 km	MPC · JPL
114340	2002 XS_{69}	—	December 5, 2002	Socorro	LINEAR	·	1.7 km	MPC · JPL
114341	2002 XU_{69}	—	December 5, 2002	Socorro	LINEAR	NYS	2.2 km	MPC · JPL
114342	2002 XX_{70}	—	December 10, 2002	Socorro	LINEAR	NYS	2.8 km	MPC · JPL
114343	2002 XY_{70}	—	December 10, 2002	Socorro	LINEAR	·	2.2 km	MPC · JPL
114344	2002 XT_{71}	—	December 11, 2002	Socorro	LINEAR	·	1.7 km	MPC · JPL
114345	2002 XN_{72}	—	December 11, 2002	Socorro	LINEAR	L5	20 km	MPC · JPL
114346	2002 XU_{73}	—	December 11, 2002	Socorro	LINEAR	EOS	6.0 km	MPC · JPL
114347	2002 XP_{74}	—	December 11, 2002	Socorro	LINEAR	·	1.6 km	MPC · JPL
114348	2002 XY_{74}	—	December 11, 2002	Socorro	LINEAR	ERI	3.9 km	MPC · JPL
114349	2002 XW_{75}	—	December 11, 2002	Socorro	LINEAR	ERI	1.4 km	MPC · JPL
114350	2002 XM_{77}	—	December 11, 2002	Socorro	LINEAR	·	4.5 km	MPC · JPL
114351	2002 XR_{78}	—	December 11, 2002	Socorro	LINEAR	V	1.7 km	MPC · JPL
114352	2002 XS_{78}	—	December 11, 2002	Socorro	LINEAR	·	1.4 km	MPC · JPL
114353	2002 XJ_{79}	—	December 11, 2002	Socorro	LINEAR	V	2.0 km	MPC · JPL
114354	2002 XR_{79}	—	December 11, 2002	Socorro	LINEAR	V	1.3 km	MPC · JPL
114355	2002 XX_{80}	—	December 11, 2002	Socorro	LINEAR	·	6.0 km	MPC · JPL
114356	2002 XZ_{80}	—	December 11, 2002	Socorro	LINEAR	fast	2.7 km	MPC · JPL
114357	2002 XC_{83}	—	December 13, 2002	Socorro	LINEAR	(5)	2.6 km	MPC · JPL
114358	2002 XP_{83}	—	December 13, 2002	Socorro	LINEAR	·	3.1 km	MPC · JPL
114359	2002 XD_{85}	—	December 11, 2002	Socorro	LINEAR	·	2.9 km	MPC · JPL
114360	2002 XS_{85}	—	December 11, 2002	Socorro	LINEAR	·	1.3 km	MPC · JPL
114361	2002 XJ_{86}	—	December 11, 2002	Socorro	LINEAR	ADE	5.1 km	MPC · JPL
114362	2002 XK_{86}	—	December 11, 2002	Socorro	LINEAR	·	1.4 km	MPC · JPL
114363	2002 XR_{86}	—	December 11, 2002	Socorro	LINEAR	·	1.4 km	MPC · JPL
114364	2002 XU_{86}	—	December 11, 2002	Socorro	LINEAR	·	1.9 km	MPC · JPL
114365	2002 XM_{87}	—	December 11, 2002	Socorro	LINEAR	·	2.7 km	MPC · JPL
114366	2002 XP_{88}	—	December 13, 2002	Socorro	LINEAR	·	1.7 km	MPC · JPL
114367	2002 XA_{89}	—	December 14, 2002	Socorro	LINEAR	·	5.7 km	MPC · JPL
114368	2002 XC_{89}	—	December 14, 2002	Socorro	LINEAR	·	2.6 km	MPC · JPL
114369	2002 XA_{95}	—	December 5, 2002	Socorro	LINEAR	·	3.1 km	MPC · JPL
114370	2002 XR_{96}	—	December 5, 2002	Socorro	LINEAR	KOR	2.8 km	MPC · JPL
114371	2002 XJ_{97}	—	December 5, 2002	Socorro	LINEAR	DOR	5.9 km	MPC · JPL
114372	2002 XW_{97}	—	December 5, 2002	Socorro	LINEAR	·	1.9 km	MPC · JPL
114373	2002 XT_{100}	—	December 5, 2002	Socorro	LINEAR	·	7.1 km	MPC · JPL
114374	2002 XH_{103}	—	December 5, 2002	Socorro	LINEAR	·	1.4 km	MPC · JPL
114375	2002 XY_{104}	—	December 5, 2002	Socorro	LINEAR	·	1.6 km	MPC · JPL
114376	2002 XB_{106}	—	December 5, 2002	Socorro	LINEAR	NYS	3.7 km	MPC · JPL
114377	2002 XP_{106}	—	December 5, 2002	Socorro	LINEAR	V	1.3 km	MPC · JPL
114378	2002 XE_{108}	—	December 6, 2002	Socorro	LINEAR	·	3.0 km	MPC · JPL
114379	2002 XM_{108}	—	December 6, 2002	Socorro	LINEAR	·	1.4 km	MPC · JPL
114380	2002 XE_{109}	—	December 6, 2002	Socorro	LINEAR	GEF	2.5 km	MPC · JPL
114381	2002 XL_{110}	—	December 6, 2002	Socorro	LINEAR	·	2.8 km	MPC · JPL
114382	2002 XC_{112}	—	December 6, 2002	Socorro	LINEAR	·	3.0 km	MPC · JPL
114383	2002 XF_{112}	—	December 6, 2002	Socorro	LINEAR	·	2.6 km	MPC · JPL
114384	2002 YF	—	December 27, 2002	Anderson Mesa	LONEOS	·	7.7 km	MPC · JPL
114385	2002 YX	—	December 27, 2002	Anderson Mesa	LONEOS	·	1.8 km	MPC · JPL
114386	2002 YG_{1}	—	December 27, 2002	Anderson Mesa	LONEOS	·	1.6 km	MPC · JPL
114387	2002 YK_{1}	—	December 27, 2002	Anderson Mesa	LONEOS	·	6.7 km	MPC · JPL
114388	2002 YL_{1}	—	December 27, 2002	Anderson Mesa	LONEOS	·	2.9 km	MPC · JPL
114389	2002 YN_{1}	—	December 27, 2002	Anderson Mesa	LONEOS	GEF	2.4 km	MPC · JPL
114390	2002 YR_{3}	—	December 28, 2002	Socorro	LINEAR	PHO	2.4 km	MPC · JPL
114391	2002 YQ_{6}	—	December 28, 2002	Anderson Mesa	LONEOS	(5)	2.0 km	MPC · JPL
114392	2002 YK_{7}	—	December 31, 2002	Tebbutt	F. B. Zoltowski	V	1.3 km	MPC · JPL
114393	2002 YH_{8}	—	December 31, 2002	Socorro	LINEAR	V	1.5 km	MPC · JPL
114394	2002 YN_{8}	—	December 31, 2002	Socorro	LINEAR	·	4.1 km	MPC · JPL
114395	2002 YQ_{8}	—	December 31, 2002	Socorro	LINEAR	·	8.5 km	MPC · JPL
114396	2002 YG_{9}	—	December 31, 2002	Socorro	LINEAR	·	2.2 km	MPC · JPL
114397	2002 YD_{10}	—	December 31, 2002	Socorro	LINEAR	MAR	2.4 km	MPC · JPL
114398	2002 YT_{13}	—	December 31, 2002	Socorro	LINEAR	·	1.4 km	MPC · JPL
114399	2002 YZ_{13}	—	December 31, 2002	Socorro	LINEAR	NYS	1.6 km	MPC · JPL
114400	2002 YG_{15}	—	December 31, 2002	Socorro	LINEAR	·	5.6 km	MPC · JPL

== 114401–114500 ==
back to top

Designation			Discovery			Properties		Ref
Permanent	Provisional	Named after	Date	Site	Discoverer(s)	Category	Diam.	Ref
114401	2002 YC_{17}	—	December 31, 2002	Socorro	LINEAR	·	5.6 km	MPC · JPL
114402	2002 YW_{17}	—	December 31, 2002	Socorro	LINEAR	·	2.1 km	MPC · JPL
114403	2002 YE_{18}	—	December 31, 2002	Socorro	LINEAR	·	2.5 km	MPC · JPL
114404	2002 YJ_{19}	—	December 31, 2002	Socorro	LINEAR	EOS	3.7 km	MPC · JPL
114405	2002 YB_{20}	—	December 31, 2002	Socorro	LINEAR	·	3.1 km	MPC · JPL
114406	2002 YG_{20}	—	December 31, 2002	Socorro	LINEAR	·	2.1 km	MPC · JPL
114407	2002 YH_{20}	—	December 31, 2002	Socorro	LINEAR	·	2.1 km	MPC · JPL
114408	2002 YS_{20}	—	December 31, 2002	Socorro	LINEAR	EOS	4.9 km	MPC · JPL
114409	2002 YY_{21}	—	December 31, 2002	Socorro	LINEAR	MAS	1.2 km	MPC · JPL
114410	2002 YO_{22}	—	December 31, 2002	Socorro	LINEAR	·	1.5 km	MPC · JPL
114411	2002 YQ_{24}	—	December 31, 2002	Socorro	LINEAR	·	2.3 km	MPC · JPL
114412	2002 YH_{25}	—	December 31, 2002	Socorro	LINEAR	·	2.9 km	MPC · JPL
114413	2002 YD_{26}	—	December 31, 2002	Socorro	LINEAR	EOS	3.5 km	MPC · JPL
114414	2002 YN_{27}	—	December 31, 2002	Socorro	LINEAR	·	3.2 km	MPC · JPL
114415	2002 YY_{27}	—	December 31, 2002	Socorro	LINEAR	NYS	2.0 km	MPC · JPL
114416	2002 YY_{28}	—	December 31, 2002	Socorro	LINEAR	·	2.7 km	MPC · JPL
114417	2002 YX_{29}	—	December 31, 2002	Socorro	LINEAR	·	5.9 km	MPC · JPL
114418	2002 YO_{31}	—	December 31, 2002	Socorro	LINEAR	PHO	3.1 km	MPC · JPL
114419	2002 YQ_{31}	—	December 31, 2002	Socorro	LINEAR	·	1.6 km	MPC · JPL
114420	2002 YR_{31}	—	December 31, 2002	Socorro	LINEAR	·	4.0 km	MPC · JPL
114421	2002 YJ_{32}	—	December 31, 2002	Socorro	LINEAR	·	2.0 km	MPC · JPL
114422	2002 YL_{33}	—	December 31, 2002	Socorro	LINEAR	·	2.4 km	MPC · JPL
114423	2002 YD_{36}	—	December 31, 2002	Socorro	LINEAR	·	3.4 km	MPC · JPL
114424	2002 YE_{36}	—	December 31, 2002	Socorro	LINEAR	·	3.5 km	MPC · JPL
114425	2003 AV	—	January 1, 2003	Socorro	LINEAR	·	4.3 km	MPC · JPL
114426	2003 AB_{2}	—	January 2, 2003	Socorro	LINEAR	·	3.0 km	MPC · JPL
114427	2003 AW_{2}	—	January 1, 2003	Socorro	LINEAR	·	5.9 km	MPC · JPL
114428	2003 AB_{4}	—	January 3, 2003	Socorro	LINEAR	PHO	2.0 km	MPC · JPL
114429	2003 AX_{4}	—	January 1, 2003	Socorro	LINEAR	·	1.9 km	MPC · JPL
114430	2003 AT_{5}	—	January 1, 2003	Socorro	LINEAR	·	2.5 km	MPC · JPL
114431	2003 AE_{6}	—	January 1, 2003	Socorro	LINEAR	·	2.8 km	MPC · JPL
114432	2003 AN_{6}	—	January 1, 2003	Socorro	LINEAR	·	1.6 km	MPC · JPL
114433	2003 AL_{7}	—	January 2, 2003	Socorro	LINEAR	CYB	7.6 km	MPC · JPL
114434	2003 AM_{10}	—	January 1, 2003	Socorro	LINEAR	·	2.8 km	MPC · JPL
114435	2003 AX_{10}	—	January 1, 2003	Socorro	LINEAR	EUN	3.3 km	MPC · JPL
114436	2003 AP_{12}	—	January 1, 2003	Socorro	LINEAR	·	1.3 km	MPC · JPL
114437	2003 AR_{12}	—	January 1, 2003	Socorro	LINEAR	·	5.8 km	MPC · JPL
114438	2003 AJ_{13}	—	January 1, 2003	Socorro	LINEAR	·	3.5 km	MPC · JPL
114439	2003 AL_{13}	—	January 1, 2003	Socorro	LINEAR	slow	3.1 km	MPC · JPL
114440	2003 AB_{14}	—	January 1, 2003	Socorro	LINEAR	·	3.6 km	MPC · JPL
114441	2003 AK_{14}	—	January 2, 2003	Socorro	LINEAR	·	5.0 km	MPC · JPL
114442	2003 AZ_{14}	—	January 2, 2003	Socorro	LINEAR	EUN	2.1 km	MPC · JPL
114443	2003 AQ_{17}	—	January 4, 2003	Socorro	LINEAR	NYS	2.7 km	MPC · JPL
114444	2003 AN_{18}	—	January 5, 2003	Socorro	LINEAR	·	3.3 km	MPC · JPL
114445	2003 AQ_{18}	—	January 3, 2003	Socorro	LINEAR	·	1.3 km	MPC · JPL
114446	2003 AS_{18}	—	January 3, 2003	Kitt Peak	Spacewatch	·	5.1 km	MPC · JPL
114447	2003 AM_{20}	—	January 5, 2003	Socorro	LINEAR	·	2.6 km	MPC · JPL
114448	2003 AL_{21}	—	January 5, 2003	Socorro	LINEAR	MAS	1.5 km	MPC · JPL
114449	2003 AJ_{22}	—	January 5, 2003	Socorro	LINEAR	EUN	2.4 km	MPC · JPL
114450	2003 AN_{22}	—	January 5, 2003	Socorro	LINEAR	·	3.2 km	MPC · JPL
114451	2003 AV_{23}	—	January 4, 2003	Socorro	LINEAR	·	2.6 km	MPC · JPL
114452	2003 AE_{25}	—	January 4, 2003	Socorro	LINEAR	·	3.6 km	MPC · JPL
114453	2003 AG_{25}	—	January 4, 2003	Socorro	LINEAR	·	7.0 km	MPC · JPL
114454	2003 AR_{27}	—	January 4, 2003	Socorro	LINEAR	·	4.0 km	MPC · JPL
114455	2003 AX_{27}	—	January 4, 2003	Socorro	LINEAR	MAR	2.7 km	MPC · JPL
114456	2003 AC_{28}	—	January 4, 2003	Socorro	LINEAR	MAS	1.4 km	MPC · JPL
114457	2003 AD_{28}	—	January 4, 2003	Socorro	LINEAR	V	1.2 km	MPC · JPL
114458	2003 AZ_{29}	—	January 4, 2003	Socorro	LINEAR	·	2.0 km	MPC · JPL
114459	2003 AN_{30}	—	January 4, 2003	Socorro	LINEAR	V	1.7 km	MPC · JPL
114460	2003 AM_{31}	—	January 5, 2003	Socorro	LINEAR	(5)	5.3 km	MPC · JPL
114461	2003 AH_{35}	—	January 7, 2003	Socorro	LINEAR	V	1.4 km	MPC · JPL
114462	2003 AX_{35}	—	January 7, 2003	Socorro	LINEAR	·	1.4 km	MPC · JPL
114463	2003 AD_{36}	—	January 7, 2003	Socorro	LINEAR	·	3.5 km	MPC · JPL
114464	2003 AO_{36}	—	January 7, 2003	Socorro	LINEAR	·	3.6 km	MPC · JPL
114465	2003 AY_{36}	—	January 7, 2003	Socorro	LINEAR	·	6.3 km	MPC · JPL
114466	2003 AA_{37}	—	January 7, 2003	Socorro	LINEAR	·	9.2 km	MPC · JPL
114467	2003 AK_{37}	—	January 7, 2003	Socorro	LINEAR	(5)	2.9 km	MPC · JPL
114468	2003 AO_{38}	—	January 7, 2003	Socorro	LINEAR	EUN	2.5 km	MPC · JPL
114469	2003 AK_{39}	—	January 7, 2003	Socorro	LINEAR	PHO	2.6 km	MPC · JPL
114470	2003 AS_{39}	—	January 7, 2003	Socorro	LINEAR	EOS	4.4 km	MPC · JPL
114471	2003 AM_{40}	—	January 7, 2003	Socorro	LINEAR	·	2.3 km	MPC · JPL
114472	2003 AR_{40}	—	January 7, 2003	Socorro	LINEAR	·	2.2 km	MPC · JPL
114473	2003 AT_{40}	—	January 7, 2003	Socorro	LINEAR	·	2.7 km	MPC · JPL
114474	2003 AS_{41}	—	January 7, 2003	Socorro	LINEAR	·	1.7 km	MPC · JPL
114475	2003 AX_{41}	—	January 7, 2003	Socorro	LINEAR	·	2.7 km	MPC · JPL
114476	2003 AD_{42}	—	January 7, 2003	Socorro	LINEAR	·	2.9 km	MPC · JPL
114477	2003 AQ_{43}	—	January 5, 2003	Socorro	LINEAR	·	1.5 km	MPC · JPL
114478	2003 AC_{44}	—	January 5, 2003	Socorro	LINEAR	·	2.0 km	MPC · JPL
114479	2003 AR_{46}	—	January 5, 2003	Socorro	LINEAR	NYS	3.0 km	MPC · JPL
114480	2003 AN_{49}	—	January 5, 2003	Socorro	LINEAR	·	2.5 km	MPC · JPL
114481	2003 AV_{50}	—	January 5, 2003	Socorro	LINEAR	·	2.0 km	MPC · JPL
114482	2003 AJ_{51}	—	January 5, 2003	Socorro	LINEAR	·	2.7 km	MPC · JPL
114483	2003 AJ_{52}	—	January 5, 2003	Socorro	LINEAR	NYS	1.4 km	MPC · JPL
114484	2003 AN_{54}	—	January 5, 2003	Socorro	LINEAR	·	3.3 km	MPC · JPL
114485	2003 AJ_{55}	—	January 5, 2003	Socorro	LINEAR	·	1.3 km	MPC · JPL
114486	2003 AJ_{57}	—	January 5, 2003	Socorro	LINEAR	·	3.9 km	MPC · JPL
114487	2003 AW_{57}	—	January 5, 2003	Socorro	LINEAR	·	1.7 km	MPC · JPL
114488	2003 AB_{58}	—	January 5, 2003	Socorro	LINEAR	·	1.9 km	MPC · JPL
114489	2003 AP_{58}	—	January 5, 2003	Socorro	LINEAR	NYS	2.3 km	MPC · JPL
114490	2003 AR_{58}	—	January 5, 2003	Socorro	LINEAR	·	2.8 km	MPC · JPL
114491	2003 AB_{60}	—	January 5, 2003	Socorro	LINEAR	·	2.5 km	MPC · JPL
114492	2003 AC_{60}	—	January 5, 2003	Socorro	LINEAR	·	1.9 km	MPC · JPL
114493	2003 AW_{60}	—	January 7, 2003	Socorro	LINEAR	·	1.3 km	MPC · JPL
114494	2003 AX_{60}	—	January 7, 2003	Socorro	LINEAR	·	3.6 km	MPC · JPL
114495	2003 AB_{61}	—	January 7, 2003	Socorro	LINEAR	·	3.3 km	MPC · JPL
114496	2003 AB_{62}	—	January 7, 2003	Socorro	LINEAR	·	6.8 km	MPC · JPL
114497	2003 AS_{63}	—	January 8, 2003	Socorro	LINEAR	·	2.9 km	MPC · JPL
114498	2003 AW_{69}	—	January 8, 2003	Socorro	LINEAR	·	2.4 km	MPC · JPL
114499	2003 AN_{70}	—	January 10, 2003	Socorro	LINEAR	·	2.7 km	MPC · JPL
114500	2003 AH_{71}	—	January 10, 2003	Socorro	LINEAR	·	3.8 km	MPC · JPL

== 114501–114600 ==
back to top

Designation			Discovery			Properties		Ref
Permanent	Provisional	Named after	Date	Site	Discoverer(s)	Category	Diam.	Ref
114501	2003 AP_{72}	—	January 11, 2003	Socorro	LINEAR	·	3.1 km	MPC · JPL
114502	2003 AD_{76}	—	January 10, 2003	Socorro	LINEAR	·	1.6 km	MPC · JPL
114503	2003 AG_{77}	—	January 10, 2003	Socorro	LINEAR	·	3.2 km	MPC · JPL
114504	2003 AR_{77}	—	January 10, 2003	Socorro	LINEAR	·	3.4 km	MPC · JPL
114505	2003 AO_{78}	—	January 10, 2003	Kitt Peak	Spacewatch	HOF	5.0 km	MPC · JPL
114506	2003 AU_{79}	—	January 11, 2003	Socorro	LINEAR	PHO	2.4 km	MPC · JPL
114507	2003 AX_{80}	—	January 12, 2003	Socorro	LINEAR	PHO	1.7 km	MPC · JPL
114508	2003 AS_{82}	—	January 11, 2003	Kitt Peak	Spacewatch	·	4.3 km	MPC · JPL
114509	2003 AZ_{85}	—	January 7, 2003	Socorro	LINEAR	·	4.4 km	MPC · JPL
114510	2003 AW_{86}	—	January 1, 2003	Socorro	LINEAR	·	1.7 km	MPC · JPL
114511	2003 AU_{88}	—	January 2, 2003	Socorro	LINEAR	·	3.9 km	MPC · JPL
114512	2003 AX_{89}	—	January 4, 2003	Socorro	LINEAR	ERI	3.4 km	MPC · JPL
114513	2003 BQ_{1}	—	January 26, 2003	Palomar	NEAT	HIL · 3:2	8.9 km	MPC · JPL
114514	2003 BX_{5}	—	January 26, 2003	Haleakala	NEAT	·	4.7 km	MPC · JPL
114515	2003 BA_{7}	—	January 25, 2003	Anderson Mesa	LONEOS	·	5.5 km	MPC · JPL
114516	2003 BZ_{7}	—	January 26, 2003	Palomar	NEAT	EUN	2.8 km	MPC · JPL
114517	2003 BF_{10}	—	January 26, 2003	Palomar	NEAT	NYS	2.0 km	MPC · JPL
114518	2003 BQ_{10}	—	January 26, 2003	Anderson Mesa	LONEOS	EOS	3.9 km	MPC · JPL
114519	2003 BZ_{10}	—	January 26, 2003	Anderson Mesa	LONEOS	·	3.4 km	MPC · JPL
114520	2003 BK_{11}	—	January 26, 2003	Anderson Mesa	LONEOS	·	5.9 km	MPC · JPL
114521	2003 BP_{11}	—	January 26, 2003	Anderson Mesa	LONEOS	·	7.2 km	MPC · JPL
114522	2003 BD_{12}	—	January 26, 2003	Anderson Mesa	LONEOS	·	4.1 km	MPC · JPL
114523	2003 BJ_{12}	—	January 26, 2003	Anderson Mesa	LONEOS	NYS	1.4 km	MPC · JPL
114524	2003 BT_{12}	—	January 26, 2003	Palomar	NEAT	·	2.6 km	MPC · JPL
114525	2003 BM_{13}	—	January 26, 2003	Haleakala	NEAT	·	1.6 km	MPC · JPL
114526	2003 BO_{15}	—	January 26, 2003	Anderson Mesa	LONEOS	·	3.8 km	MPC · JPL
114527	2003 BF_{16}	—	January 26, 2003	Haleakala	NEAT	·	1.6 km	MPC · JPL
114528	2003 BO_{16}	—	January 26, 2003	Haleakala	NEAT	·	6.2 km	MPC · JPL
114529	2003 BT_{16}	—	January 26, 2003	Haleakala	NEAT	·	2.9 km	MPC · JPL
114530	2003 BV_{16}	—	January 26, 2003	Haleakala	NEAT	·	4.0 km	MPC · JPL
114531	2003 BU_{17}	—	January 27, 2003	Socorro	LINEAR	MAS	1.2 km	MPC · JPL
114532	2003 BY_{17}	—	January 27, 2003	Socorro	LINEAR	NYS	2.0 km	MPC · JPL
114533	2003 BY_{18}	—	January 27, 2003	Socorro	LINEAR	EUP	13 km	MPC · JPL
114534	2003 BT_{19}	—	January 26, 2003	Anderson Mesa	LONEOS	·	9.1 km	MPC · JPL
114535	2003 BU_{19}	—	January 26, 2003	Anderson Mesa	LONEOS	·	3.6 km	MPC · JPL
114536	2003 BM_{20}	—	January 27, 2003	Socorro	LINEAR	·	6.4 km	MPC · JPL
114537	2003 BO_{20}	—	January 27, 2003	Anderson Mesa	LONEOS	EOS	4.3 km	MPC · JPL
114538	2003 BA_{22}	—	January 27, 2003	Socorro	LINEAR	PHO	2.0 km	MPC · JPL
114539	2003 BB_{22}	—	January 24, 2003	Palomar	NEAT	·	3.7 km	MPC · JPL
114540	2003 BF_{24}	—	January 25, 2003	Palomar	NEAT	·	4.8 km	MPC · JPL
114541	2003 BP_{25}	—	January 26, 2003	Palomar	NEAT	slow	3.2 km	MPC · JPL
114542	2003 BL_{26}	—	January 26, 2003	Palomar	NEAT	EUN	2.8 km	MPC · JPL
114543	2003 BZ_{26}	—	January 26, 2003	Anderson Mesa	LONEOS	NYS	2.4 km	MPC · JPL
114544	2003 BN_{28}	—	January 26, 2003	Haleakala	NEAT	·	3.5 km	MPC · JPL
114545	2003 BS_{29}	—	January 27, 2003	Socorro	LINEAR	·	3.5 km	MPC · JPL
114546	2003 BY_{29}	—	January 27, 2003	Socorro	LINEAR	NYS	1.4 km	MPC · JPL
114547	2003 BE_{31}	—	January 27, 2003	Socorro	LINEAR	EOS	4.7 km	MPC · JPL
114548	2003 BO_{31}	—	January 27, 2003	Socorro	LINEAR	EUN	2.8 km	MPC · JPL
114549	2003 BU_{32}	—	January 27, 2003	Palomar	NEAT	·	3.9 km	MPC · JPL
114550	2003 BQ_{33}	—	January 27, 2003	Haleakala	NEAT	NYS	2.1 km	MPC · JPL
114551	2003 BO_{34}	—	January 26, 2003	Haleakala	NEAT	HOF	4.6 km	MPC · JPL
114552	2003 BF_{38}	—	January 27, 2003	Anderson Mesa	LONEOS	ULA · CYB	9.6 km	MPC · JPL
114553	2003 BH_{42}	—	January 27, 2003	Haleakala	NEAT	·	4.3 km	MPC · JPL
114554	2003 BK_{42}	—	January 28, 2003	Socorro	LINEAR	·	3.0 km	MPC · JPL
114555	2003 BN_{44}	—	January 27, 2003	Socorro	LINEAR	DOR	5.5 km	MPC · JPL
114556	2003 BR_{50}	—	January 27, 2003	Socorro	LINEAR	slow	2.2 km	MPC · JPL
114557	2003 BL_{51}	—	January 27, 2003	Socorro	LINEAR	·	3.3 km	MPC · JPL
114558	2003 BX_{51}	—	January 27, 2003	Socorro	LINEAR	·	3.3 km	MPC · JPL
114559	2003 BD_{52}	—	January 27, 2003	Socorro	LINEAR	EUN	3.3 km	MPC · JPL
114560	2003 BL_{52}	—	January 27, 2003	Socorro	LINEAR	·	6.8 km	MPC · JPL
114561	2003 BP_{52}	—	January 27, 2003	Socorro	LINEAR	·	1.5 km	MPC · JPL
114562	2003 BR_{53}	—	January 27, 2003	Anderson Mesa	LONEOS	EOS	3.5 km	MPC · JPL
114563	2003 BM_{55}	—	January 27, 2003	Palomar	NEAT	·	1.5 km	MPC · JPL
114564	2003 BR_{55}	—	January 28, 2003	Socorro	LINEAR	·	2.8 km	MPC · JPL
114565	2003 BN_{60}	—	January 27, 2003	Palomar	NEAT	·	2.2 km	MPC · JPL
114566	2003 BW_{62}	—	January 28, 2003	Palomar	NEAT	V	1.3 km	MPC · JPL
114567	2003 BB_{63}	—	January 28, 2003	Socorro	LINEAR	fast	7.1 km	MPC · JPL
114568	2003 BC_{63}	—	January 28, 2003	Socorro	LINEAR	·	3.5 km	MPC · JPL
114569	2003 BW_{63}	—	January 28, 2003	Socorro	LINEAR	EUN	7.2 km	MPC · JPL
114570	2003 BB_{64}	—	January 28, 2003	Haleakala	NEAT	·	3.3 km	MPC · JPL
114571	2003 BN_{65}	—	January 30, 2003	Anderson Mesa	LONEOS	·	4.0 km	MPC · JPL
114572	2003 BC_{68}	—	January 27, 2003	Palomar	NEAT	·	5.6 km	MPC · JPL
114573	2003 BJ_{68}	—	January 28, 2003	Palomar	NEAT	·	5.2 km	MPC · JPL
114574	2003 BL_{68}	—	January 28, 2003	Socorro	LINEAR	·	7.2 km	MPC · JPL
114575	2003 BH_{71}	—	January 31, 2003	Socorro	LINEAR	·	3.8 km	MPC · JPL
114576	2003 BG_{73}	—	January 28, 2003	Haleakala	NEAT	HYG	6.6 km	MPC · JPL
114577	2003 BR_{73}	—	January 29, 2003	Palomar	NEAT	·	2.2 km	MPC · JPL
114578	2003 BW_{73}	—	January 29, 2003	Palomar	NEAT	·	4.0 km	MPC · JPL
114579	2003 BX_{75}	—	January 29, 2003	Palomar	NEAT	EOS	3.5 km	MPC · JPL
114580	2003 BP_{77}	—	January 30, 2003	Anderson Mesa	LONEOS	EOS	4.0 km	MPC · JPL
114581	2003 BX_{77}	—	January 30, 2003	Anderson Mesa	LONEOS	·	4.9 km	MPC · JPL
114582	2003 BR_{78}	—	January 31, 2003	Socorro	LINEAR	·	2.8 km	MPC · JPL
114583	2003 BD_{80}	—	January 31, 2003	Socorro	LINEAR	·	2.7 km	MPC · JPL
114584	2003 BF_{80}	—	January 31, 2003	Anderson Mesa	LONEOS	·	4.2 km	MPC · JPL
114585	2003 BL_{80}	—	January 31, 2003	Anderson Mesa	LONEOS	HNS	2.6 km	MPC · JPL
114586	2003 BZ_{80}	—	January 30, 2003	Anderson Mesa	LONEOS	·	6.1 km	MPC · JPL
114587	2003 BQ_{82}	—	January 31, 2003	Socorro	LINEAR	·	2.9 km	MPC · JPL
114588	2003 BB_{84}	—	January 31, 2003	Socorro	LINEAR	·	1.6 km	MPC · JPL
114589	2003 BE_{84}	—	January 31, 2003	Socorro	LINEAR	·	4.0 km	MPC · JPL
114590	2003 BB_{86}	—	January 23, 2003	Kitt Peak	Spacewatch	GEF	5.3 km	MPC · JPL
114591	2003 CS_{1}	—	February 1, 2003	Socorro	LINEAR	NYS	1.9 km	MPC · JPL
114592	2003 CU_{2}	—	February 2, 2003	Socorro	LINEAR	·	3.5 km	MPC · JPL
114593	2003 CG_{3}	—	February 2, 2003	Socorro	LINEAR	·	2.3 km	MPC · JPL
114594	2003 CF_{4}	—	February 1, 2003	Socorro	LINEAR	·	5.9 km	MPC · JPL
114595	2003 CO_{6}	—	February 1, 2003	Socorro	LINEAR	·	3.5 km	MPC · JPL
114596	2003 CY_{6}	—	February 1, 2003	Socorro	LINEAR	·	1.8 km	MPC · JPL
114597	2003 CF_{7}	—	February 1, 2003	Socorro	LINEAR	EUN	2.3 km	MPC · JPL
114598	2003 CN_{8}	—	February 1, 2003	Haleakala	NEAT	·	3.7 km	MPC · JPL
114599	2003 CG_{9}	—	February 2, 2003	Anderson Mesa	LONEOS	·	12 km	MPC · JPL
114600	2003 CG_{10}	—	February 2, 2003	Socorro	LINEAR	·	3.7 km	MPC · JPL

== 114601–114700 ==
back to top

Designation			Discovery			Properties		Ref
Permanent	Provisional	Named after	Date	Site	Discoverer(s)	Category	Diam.	Ref
114601	2003 CB_{12}	—	February 2, 2003	Palomar	NEAT	·	3.8 km	MPC · JPL
114602	2003 CD_{12}	—	February 2, 2003	Palomar	NEAT	·	3.9 km	MPC · JPL
114603	2003 CY_{12}	—	February 2, 2003	Palomar	NEAT	·	2.3 km	MPC · JPL
114604	2003 CC_{13}	—	February 3, 2003	Palomar	NEAT	·	3.0 km	MPC · JPL
114605	2003 CL_{15}	—	February 4, 2003	Haleakala-AMOS(!)	NEAT	·	1.6 km	MPC · JPL
114606	2003 CV_{18}	—	February 6, 2003	Socorro	LINEAR	·	4.0 km	MPC · JPL
114607	2003 DZ_{4}	—	February 19, 2003	Palomar	NEAT	·	4.3 km	MPC · JPL
114608 Emanuelepace	2003 DC_{7}	Emanuelepace	February 23, 2003	Campo Imperatore	CINEOS	TIR	5.9 km	MPC · JPL
114609	2003 DT_{7}	—	February 22, 2003	Palomar	NEAT	AEO	2.5 km	MPC · JPL
114610	2003 DN_{8}	—	February 22, 2003	Palomar	NEAT	·	1.8 km	MPC · JPL
114611 Valeriobocci	2003 DE_{9}	Valeriobocci	February 24, 2003	Campo Imperatore	CINEOS	·	3.5 km	MPC · JPL
114612 Sandrasavaglio	2003 DV_{12}	Sandrasavaglio	February 26, 2003	Campo Imperatore	CINEOS	·	3.6 km	MPC · JPL
114613 Antoninobrosio	2003 DS_{15}	Antoninobrosio	February 25, 2003	Campo Imperatore	CINEOS	·	5.7 km	MPC · JPL
114614	2003 DQ_{17}	—	February 22, 2003	Goodricke-Pigott	Kessel, J. W.	EMA	8.0 km	MPC · JPL
114615	2003 DA_{18}	—	February 19, 2003	Palomar	NEAT	·	3.7 km	MPC · JPL
114616	2003 DK_{19}	—	February 21, 2003	Palomar	NEAT	·	3.3 km	MPC · JPL
114617	2003 DU_{20}	—	February 22, 2003	Palomar	NEAT	·	2.9 km	MPC · JPL
114618	2003 EO	—	March 3, 2003	Palomar	NEAT	·	3.5 km	MPC · JPL
114619	2003 EP	—	March 3, 2003	Haleakala	NEAT	·	3.6 km	MPC · JPL
114620	2003 EL_{4}	—	March 6, 2003	Desert Eagle	W. K. Y. Yeung	·	7.4 km	MPC · JPL
114621	2003 ET_{5}	—	March 5, 2003	Socorro	LINEAR	·	3.8 km	MPC · JPL
114622	2003 EZ_{7}	—	March 6, 2003	Anderson Mesa	LONEOS	MAR	1.8 km	MPC · JPL
114623	2003 EJ_{8}	—	March 6, 2003	Anderson Mesa	LONEOS	·	3.4 km	MPC · JPL
114624	2003 EX_{9}	—	March 6, 2003	Anderson Mesa	LONEOS	HYG	4.1 km	MPC · JPL
114625	2003 EQ_{10}	—	March 6, 2003	Socorro	LINEAR	·	3.6 km	MPC · JPL
114626	2003 EP_{13}	—	March 6, 2003	Socorro	LINEAR	LIX	7.2 km	MPC · JPL
114627	2003 EZ_{15}	—	March 7, 2003	Palomar	NEAT	·	4.2 km	MPC · JPL
114628	2003 ET_{16}	—	March 8, 2003	Nogales	P. R. Holvorcem, M. Schwartz	·	2.7 km	MPC · JPL
114629	2003 EU_{16}	—	March 6, 2003	Anderson Mesa	LONEOS	·	3.6 km	MPC · JPL
114630	2003 EW_{17}	—	March 6, 2003	Anderson Mesa	LONEOS	·	3.6 km	MPC · JPL
114631	2003 ET_{19}	—	March 6, 2003	Goodricke-Pigott	Goodricke-Pigott	AGN	2.3 km	MPC · JPL
114632	2003 EB_{21}	—	March 6, 2003	Anderson Mesa	LONEOS	·	5.9 km	MPC · JPL
114633	2003 EW_{21}	—	March 6, 2003	Socorro	LINEAR	·	5.7 km	MPC · JPL
114634	2003 EN_{24}	—	March 6, 2003	Socorro	LINEAR	·	2.0 km	MPC · JPL
114635	2003 EW_{26}	—	March 6, 2003	Socorro	LINEAR	THM	6.4 km	MPC · JPL
114636	2003 EW_{28}	—	March 6, 2003	Socorro	LINEAR	GEF	2.7 km	MPC · JPL
114637	2003 EY_{28}	—	March 6, 2003	Socorro	LINEAR	PHO	2.2 km	MPC · JPL
114638	2003 EP_{29}	—	March 6, 2003	Socorro	LINEAR	·	3.7 km	MPC · JPL
114639	2003 EF_{32}	—	March 7, 2003	Kitt Peak	Spacewatch	THM	4.9 km	MPC · JPL
114640	2003 EK_{35}	—	March 7, 2003	Socorro	LINEAR	·	7.0 km	MPC · JPL
114641	2003 EX_{38}	—	March 8, 2003	Kitt Peak	Spacewatch	KOR	2.2 km	MPC · JPL
114642	2003 EG_{39}	—	March 8, 2003	Socorro	LINEAR	MAR	2.1 km	MPC · JPL
114643	2003 EY_{39}	—	March 8, 2003	Socorro	LINEAR	·	7.6 km	MPC · JPL
114644	2003 EY_{40}	—	March 8, 2003	Kitt Peak	Spacewatch	·	2.1 km	MPC · JPL
114645	2003 EZ_{40}	—	March 8, 2003	Anderson Mesa	LONEOS	H	1.4 km	MPC · JPL
114646	2003 ER_{41}	—	March 6, 2003	Socorro	LINEAR	·	4.3 km	MPC · JPL
114647	2003 ER_{44}	—	March 7, 2003	Anderson Mesa	LONEOS	·	11 km	MPC · JPL
114648	2003 EK_{45}	—	March 7, 2003	Socorro	LINEAR	·	4.3 km	MPC · JPL
114649 Jeanneacker	2003 EN_{52}	Jeanneacker	March 6, 2003	Saint-Sulpice	B. Christophe	·	6.5 km	MPC · JPL
114650	2003 EW_{52}	—	March 8, 2003	Socorro	LINEAR	·	8.2 km	MPC · JPL
114651	2003 EZ_{52}	—	March 8, 2003	Socorro	LINEAR	EUN	2.8 km	MPC · JPL
114652	2003 EU_{53}	—	March 11, 2003	Socorro	LINEAR	·	3.3 km	MPC · JPL
114653	2003 EX_{55}	—	March 9, 2003	Socorro	LINEAR	·	4.2 km	MPC · JPL
114654	2003 ER_{57}	—	March 9, 2003	Socorro	LINEAR	·	7.1 km	MPC · JPL
114655	2003 ES_{57}	—	March 9, 2003	Socorro	LINEAR	H	1.5 km	MPC · JPL
114656	2003 FE_{3}	—	March 24, 2003	Socorro	LINEAR	·	6.8 km	MPC · JPL
114657	2003 FG_{3}	—	March 24, 2003	Socorro	LINEAR	·	7.6 km	MPC · JPL
114658	2003 FP_{6}	—	March 27, 2003	Needville	Casady, L., Garossino, P.	THM	5.2 km	MPC · JPL
114659 Sajnovics	2003 FJ_{7}	Sajnovics	March 28, 2003	Piszkéstető	K. Sárneczky	·	1.8 km	MPC · JPL
114660	2003 FS_{7}	—	March 30, 2003	Nashville	Clingan, R.	·	3.7 km	MPC · JPL
114661	2003 FR_{11}	—	March 23, 2003	Kitt Peak	Spacewatch	·	1.6 km	MPC · JPL
114662	2003 FA_{12}	—	March 23, 2003	Kitt Peak	Spacewatch	KOR	2.2 km	MPC · JPL
114663	2003 FZ_{14}	—	March 23, 2003	Catalina	CSS	HYG	6.1 km	MPC · JPL
114664	2003 FO_{15}	—	March 23, 2003	Kitt Peak	Spacewatch	·	3.7 km	MPC · JPL
114665	2003 FS_{28}	—	March 24, 2003	Haleakala	NEAT	V	1.3 km	MPC · JPL
114666	2003 FW_{36}	—	March 23, 2003	Kitt Peak	Spacewatch	·	6.4 km	MPC · JPL
114667	2003 FQ_{37}	—	March 23, 2003	Kitt Peak	Spacewatch	·	5.0 km	MPC · JPL
114668	2003 FN_{42}	—	March 23, 2003	Kitt Peak	Spacewatch	THM	6.0 km	MPC · JPL
114669	2003 FU_{43}	—	March 23, 2003	Kitt Peak	Spacewatch	THM	6.1 km	MPC · JPL
114670	2003 FT_{44}	—	March 23, 2003	Haleakala	NEAT	·	4.3 km	MPC · JPL
114671	2003 FW_{44}	—	March 24, 2003	Kitt Peak	Spacewatch	·	3.5 km	MPC · JPL
114672	2003 FU_{45}	—	March 24, 2003	Kitt Peak	Spacewatch	·	4.8 km	MPC · JPL
114673	2003 FY_{46}	—	March 24, 2003	Kitt Peak	Spacewatch	KOR	2.8 km	MPC · JPL
114674	2003 FU_{49}	—	March 24, 2003	Haleakala	NEAT	EOS	3.7 km	MPC · JPL
114675	2003 FV_{49}	—	March 24, 2003	Haleakala	NEAT	·	7.7 km	MPC · JPL
114676	2003 FZ_{49}	—	March 24, 2003	Haleakala	NEAT	·	7.3 km	MPC · JPL
114677	2003 FD_{52}	—	March 25, 2003	Palomar	NEAT	·	4.6 km	MPC · JPL
114678	2003 FU_{53}	—	March 25, 2003	Kitt Peak	Spacewatch	·	1.8 km	MPC · JPL
114679	2003 FJ_{54}	—	March 25, 2003	Haleakala	NEAT	·	4.5 km	MPC · JPL
114680	2003 FE_{56}	—	March 26, 2003	Kitt Peak	Spacewatch	THM	5.8 km	MPC · JPL
114681	2003 FK_{71}	—	March 26, 2003	Kitt Peak	Spacewatch	THM	3.2 km	MPC · JPL
114682	2003 FH_{72}	—	March 26, 2003	Palomar	NEAT	·	3.4 km	MPC · JPL
114683	2003 FC_{73}	—	March 26, 2003	Haleakala	NEAT	·	1.4 km	MPC · JPL
114684	2003 FV_{76}	—	March 27, 2003	Palomar	NEAT	·	8.4 km	MPC · JPL
114685	2003 FM_{79}	—	March 27, 2003	Kitt Peak	Spacewatch	·	2.6 km	MPC · JPL
114686	2003 FN_{80}	—	March 27, 2003	Socorro	LINEAR	·	4.1 km	MPC · JPL
114687	2003 FC_{81}	—	March 27, 2003	Socorro	LINEAR	·	2.5 km	MPC · JPL
114688	2003 FK_{81}	—	March 27, 2003	Catalina	CSS	·	3.4 km	MPC · JPL
114689 Tomstevens	2003 FJ_{84}	Tomstevens	March 28, 2003	Needville	J. Dellinger	·	3.4 km	MPC · JPL
114690	2003 FK_{87}	—	March 28, 2003	Catalina	CSS	·	1.5 km	MPC · JPL
114691	2003 FJ_{88}	—	March 28, 2003	Kitt Peak	Spacewatch	·	1.3 km	MPC · JPL
114692	2003 FW_{89}	—	March 29, 2003	Anderson Mesa	LONEOS	(2076)	2.2 km	MPC · JPL
114693	2003 FC_{93}	—	March 29, 2003	Anderson Mesa	LONEOS	·	5.2 km	MPC · JPL
114694	2003 FC_{99}	—	March 30, 2003	Socorro	LINEAR	L4	22 km	MPC · JPL
114695	2003 FS_{102}	—	March 31, 2003	Socorro	LINEAR	·	2.1 km	MPC · JPL
114696	2003 FY_{106}	—	March 27, 2003	Anderson Mesa	LONEOS	·	2.2 km	MPC · JPL
114697	2003 FS_{109}	—	March 28, 2003	Kitt Peak	Spacewatch	·	6.2 km	MPC · JPL
114698	2003 FG_{114}	—	March 31, 2003	Kitt Peak	Spacewatch	·	5.2 km	MPC · JPL
114699	2003 FO_{115}	—	March 31, 2003	Socorro	LINEAR	·	1.8 km	MPC · JPL
114700	2003 FV_{115}	—	March 31, 2003	Socorro	LINEAR	·	7.6 km	MPC · JPL

== 114701–114800 ==
back to top

Designation			Discovery			Properties		Ref
Permanent	Provisional	Named after	Date	Site	Discoverer(s)	Category	Diam.	Ref
114701	2003 FQ_{116}	—	March 23, 2003	Kitt Peak	Spacewatch	·	2.0 km	MPC · JPL
114702	2003 FU_{119}	—	March 26, 2003	Anderson Mesa	LONEOS	·	4.1 km	MPC · JPL
114703 North Dakota	2003 FA_{120}	North Dakota	March 24, 2003	Goodricke-Pigott	Reddy, V.	KOR	3.1 km	MPC · JPL
114704	2003 FO_{121}	—	March 25, 2003	Anderson Mesa	LONEOS	·	3.8 km	MPC · JPL
114705 Tamayo	2003 FP_{124}	Tamayo	March 30, 2003	Kitt Peak	M. W. Buie	·	4.5 km	MPC · JPL
114706	2003 GB_{1}	—	April 1, 2003	Socorro	LINEAR	CLO	5.4 km	MPC · JPL
114707	2003 GC_{1}	—	April 1, 2003	Anderson Mesa	LONEOS	·	8.4 km	MPC · JPL
114708	2003 GD_{4}	—	April 1, 2003	Socorro	LINEAR	·	2.0 km	MPC · JPL
114709	2003 GU_{5}	—	April 1, 2003	Socorro	LINEAR	·	6.5 km	MPC · JPL
114710	2003 GX_{7}	—	April 3, 2003	Anderson Mesa	LONEOS	L4	20 km	MPC · JPL
114711	2003 GC_{9}	—	April 2, 2003	Socorro	LINEAR	·	3.7 km	MPC · JPL
114712	2003 GF_{9}	—	April 2, 2003	Socorro	LINEAR	EUP	7.9 km	MPC · JPL
114713	2003 GN_{14}	—	April 2, 2003	Palomar	NEAT	·	3.9 km	MPC · JPL
114714	2003 GC_{15}	—	April 4, 2003	Kitt Peak	Spacewatch	EOS	3.3 km	MPC · JPL
114715	2003 GL_{15}	—	April 3, 2003	Anderson Mesa	LONEOS	·	3.7 km	MPC · JPL
114716	2003 GH_{17}	—	April 6, 2003	Socorro	LINEAR	H	1.0 km	MPC · JPL
114717	2003 GD_{18}	—	April 4, 2003	Kitt Peak	Spacewatch	·	5.4 km	MPC · JPL
114718	2003 GN_{23}	—	April 4, 2003	Anderson Mesa	LONEOS	·	3.8 km	MPC · JPL
114719	2003 GW_{30}	—	April 8, 2003	Kitt Peak	Spacewatch	·	5.8 km	MPC · JPL
114720	2003 GZ_{30}	—	April 8, 2003	Socorro	LINEAR	HNS	1.9 km	MPC · JPL
114721	2003 GG_{32}	—	April 8, 2003	Socorro	LINEAR	·	4.8 km	MPC · JPL
114722	2003 GN_{33}	—	April 3, 2003	Cerro Tololo	Deep Lens Survey	·	3.8 km	MPC · JPL
114723	2003 GU_{34}	—	April 7, 2003	Kitt Peak	Spacewatch	EOS	3.5 km	MPC · JPL
114724	2003 GK_{36}	—	April 5, 2003	Socorro	LINEAR	·	3.5 km	MPC · JPL
114725 Gordonwalker	2003 GW_{36}	Gordonwalker	April 6, 2003	Anderson Mesa	LONEOS	·	7.6 km	MPC · JPL
114726	2003 HE_{1}	—	April 21, 2003	Catalina	CSS	·	4.0 km	MPC · JPL
114727	2003 HG_{3}	—	April 24, 2003	Anderson Mesa	LONEOS	HYG	6.4 km	MPC · JPL
114728	2003 HP_{3}	—	April 24, 2003	Anderson Mesa	LONEOS	·	2.0 km	MPC · JPL
114729	2003 HA_{6}	—	April 25, 2003	Nashville	Clingan, R.	V	1.1 km	MPC · JPL
114730	2003 HH_{6}	—	April 25, 2003	Kitt Peak	Spacewatch	KOR	2.4 km	MPC · JPL
114731	2003 HN_{7}	—	April 24, 2003	Anderson Mesa	LONEOS	·	5.8 km	MPC · JPL
114732	2003 HT_{8}	—	April 24, 2003	Anderson Mesa	LONEOS	·	2.3 km	MPC · JPL
114733	2003 HX_{8}	—	April 24, 2003	Anderson Mesa	LONEOS	·	7.9 km	MPC · JPL
114734	2003 HA_{9}	—	April 24, 2003	Anderson Mesa	LONEOS	·	3.3 km	MPC · JPL
114735 Irenemagni	2003 HP_{9}	Irenemagni	April 24, 2003	Campo Imperatore	F. Bernardi	URS	7.1 km	MPC · JPL
114736	2003 HZ_{10}	—	April 25, 2003	Kitt Peak	Spacewatch	·	3.8 km	MPC · JPL
114737	2003 HX_{11}	—	April 25, 2003	Anderson Mesa	LONEOS	·	2.8 km	MPC · JPL
114738 Melissa	2003 HQ_{12}	Melissa	April 23, 2003	Campo Imperatore	CINEOS	V	1.4 km	MPC · JPL
114739 Tripodi	2003 HR_{12}	Tripodi	April 23, 2003	Campo Imperatore	CINEOS	·	6.9 km	MPC · JPL
114740 Luigitatto	2003 HB_{14}	Luigitatto	April 25, 2003	Campo Imperatore	F. Bernardi	·	6.6 km	MPC · JPL
114741	2003 HH_{14}	—	April 26, 2003	Socorro	LINEAR	·	2.9 km	MPC · JPL
114742	2003 HJ_{16}	—	April 24, 2003	Socorro	LINEAR	H	990 m	MPC · JPL
114743	2003 HL_{20}	—	April 24, 2003	Anderson Mesa	LONEOS	·	5.2 km	MPC · JPL
114744	2003 HU_{20}	—	April 24, 2003	Anderson Mesa	LONEOS	·	2.2 km	MPC · JPL
114745	2003 HD_{21}	—	April 25, 2003	Kitt Peak	Spacewatch	·	1.7 km	MPC · JPL
114746	2003 HN_{21}	—	April 26, 2003	Haleakala	NEAT	·	2.7 km	MPC · JPL
114747	2003 HH_{27}	—	April 27, 2003	Anderson Mesa	LONEOS	·	5.3 km	MPC · JPL
114748	2003 HC_{28}	—	April 26, 2003	Haleakala	NEAT	URS ·	5.2 km	MPC · JPL
114749	2003 HR_{29}	—	April 28, 2003	Anderson Mesa	LONEOS	HIL · 3:2	10 km	MPC · JPL
114750	2003 HP_{40}	—	April 29, 2003	Socorro	LINEAR	·	1.9 km	MPC · JPL
114751	2003 HN_{41}	—	April 29, 2003	Haleakala	NEAT	·	2.9 km	MPC · JPL
114752	2003 HW_{41}	—	April 29, 2003	Haleakala	NEAT	·	4.8 km	MPC · JPL
114753	2003 HP_{42}	—	April 28, 2003	Nogales	M. Schwartz, P. R. Holvorcem	·	7.7 km	MPC · JPL
114754	2003 HX_{42}	—	April 29, 2003	Reedy Creek	J. Broughton	·	3.3 km	MPC · JPL
114755	2003 HP_{44}	—	April 28, 2003	Kitt Peak	Spacewatch	·	3.4 km	MPC · JPL
114756	2003 HC_{45}	—	April 29, 2003	Socorro	LINEAR	·	1.9 km	MPC · JPL
114757	2003 HG_{45}	—	April 29, 2003	Socorro	LINEAR	·	6.8 km	MPC · JPL
114758	2003 HD_{46}	—	April 28, 2003	Anderson Mesa	LONEOS	·	5.8 km	MPC · JPL
114759	2003 HS_{46}	—	April 28, 2003	Socorro	LINEAR	·	3.8 km	MPC · JPL
114760	2003 HY_{46}	—	April 28, 2003	Socorro	LINEAR	·	3.6 km	MPC · JPL
114761	2003 HN_{47}	—	April 29, 2003	Anderson Mesa	LONEOS	THM	4.2 km	MPC · JPL
114762	2003 HE_{54}	—	April 24, 2003	Anderson Mesa	LONEOS	·	2.7 km	MPC · JPL
114763	2003 JF_{1}	—	May 1, 2003	Kitt Peak	Spacewatch	·	3.2 km	MPC · JPL
114764	2003 JJ_{1}	—	May 1, 2003	Socorro	LINEAR	·	1.5 km	MPC · JPL
114765	2003 JO_{1}	—	May 1, 2003	Socorro	LINEAR	NYS	2.0 km	MPC · JPL
114766	2003 JW_{2}	—	May 2, 2003	Socorro	LINEAR	H	830 m	MPC · JPL
114767	2003 JE_{11}	—	May 2, 2003	Reedy Creek	J. Broughton	·	3.5 km	MPC · JPL
114768	2003 JH_{12}	—	May 5, 2003	Kitt Peak	Spacewatch	·	4.9 km	MPC · JPL
114769	2003 JM_{13}	—	May 6, 2003	Kitt Peak	Spacewatch	·	2.5 km	MPC · JPL
114770	2003 JR_{14}	—	May 1, 2003	Kitt Peak	Spacewatch	·	4.6 km	MPC · JPL
114771	2003 JB_{17}	—	May 10, 2003	Reedy Creek	J. Broughton	PHO	1.9 km	MPC · JPL
114772	2003 KD_{4}	—	May 24, 2003	Reedy Creek	J. Broughton	·	3.1 km	MPC · JPL
114773	2003 KE_{4}	—	May 24, 2003	Reedy Creek	J. Broughton	PHO	5.8 km	MPC · JPL
114774	2003 KZ_{13}	—	May 27, 2003	Socorro	LINEAR	·	6.5 km	MPC · JPL
114775	2003 KF_{14}	—	May 25, 2003	Kitt Peak	Spacewatch	·	3.7 km	MPC · JPL
114776	2003 MJ	—	June 20, 2003	Reedy Creek	J. Broughton	·	2.4 km	MPC · JPL
114777	2003 MG_{2}	—	June 23, 2003	Anderson Mesa	LONEOS	·	4.3 km	MPC · JPL
114778	2003 ML_{2}	—	June 22, 2003	Anderson Mesa	LONEOS	·	2.7 km	MPC · JPL
114779	2003 MQ_{2}	—	June 25, 2003	Haleakala	NEAT	·	3.0 km	MPC · JPL
114780	2003 MD_{3}	—	June 25, 2003	Socorro	LINEAR	·	1.4 km	MPC · JPL
114781	2003 ML_{4}	—	June 25, 2003	Socorro	LINEAR	·	2.3 km	MPC · JPL
114782	2003 MB_{6}	—	June 26, 2003	Socorro	LINEAR	·	1.9 km	MPC · JPL
114783	2003 ME_{6}	—	June 26, 2003	Socorro	LINEAR	·	3.4 km	MPC · JPL
114784	2003 MF_{6}	—	June 26, 2003	Haleakala	NEAT	·	2.1 km	MPC · JPL
114785	2003 MH_{6}	—	June 26, 2003	Haleakala	NEAT	·	2.9 km	MPC · JPL
114786	2003 MR_{6}	—	June 26, 2003	Socorro	LINEAR	·	9.4 km	MPC · JPL
114787	2003 MX_{9}	—	June 29, 2003	Reedy Creek	J. Broughton	ERI	3.9 km	MPC · JPL
114788	2003 MA_{10}	—	June 29, 2003	Reedy Creek	J. Broughton	·	2.7 km	MPC · JPL
114789	2003 MT_{10}	—	June 26, 2003	Socorro	LINEAR	·	4.2 km	MPC · JPL
114790	2003 MS_{11}	—	June 27, 2003	Socorro	LINEAR	·	4.9 km	MPC · JPL
114791	2003 ML_{12}	—	June 29, 2003	Socorro	LINEAR	·	8.2 km	MPC · JPL
114792	2003 MT_{12}	—	June 30, 2003	Socorro	LINEAR	H	1.1 km	MPC · JPL
114793	2003 NK_{1}	—	July 1, 2003	Socorro	LINEAR	PHO	2.4 km	MPC · JPL
114794	2003 NM_{1}	—	July 1, 2003	Socorro	LINEAR	·	4.5 km	MPC · JPL
114795	2003 NP_{1}	—	July 2, 2003	Socorro	LINEAR	(5)	2.3 km	MPC · JPL
114796	2003 NO_{2}	—	July 3, 2003	Reedy Creek	J. Broughton	·	2.4 km	MPC · JPL
114797	2003 NL_{3}	—	July 4, 2003	Anderson Mesa	LONEOS	H	1.4 km	MPC · JPL
114798	2003 NW_{3}	—	July 3, 2003	Kitt Peak	Spacewatch	·	2.2 km	MPC · JPL
114799	2003 NP_{6}	—	July 8, 2003	Anderson Mesa	LONEOS	·	6.5 km	MPC · JPL
114800	2003 NM_{7}	—	July 8, 2003	Anderson Mesa	LONEOS	·	1.4 km	MPC · JPL

== 114801–114900 ==
back to top

Designation			Discovery			Properties		Ref
Permanent	Provisional	Named after	Date	Site	Discoverer(s)	Category	Diam.	Ref
114801	2003 NG_{8}	—	July 8, 2003	Palomar	NEAT	·	3.8 km	MPC · JPL
114802	2003 NN_{8}	—	July 1, 2003	Socorro	LINEAR	·	2.8 km	MPC · JPL
114803	2003 NP_{8}	—	July 10, 2003	Haleakala	NEAT	NYS	2.4 km	MPC · JPL
114804	2003 NS_{8}	—	July 10, 2003	Haleakala	NEAT	T_{j} (2.96) · CYB	9.3 km	MPC · JPL
114805	2003 NR_{10}	—	July 3, 2003	Kitt Peak	Spacewatch	ADE	4.1 km	MPC · JPL
114806	2003 OR	—	July 20, 2003	Reedy Creek	J. Broughton	NYS	2.4 km	MPC · JPL
114807	2003 OK_{1}	—	July 20, 2003	Palomar	NEAT	·	7.7 km	MPC · JPL
114808	2003 OP_{3}	—	July 22, 2003	Haleakala	NEAT	·	7.4 km	MPC · JPL
114809	2003 OA_{5}	—	July 22, 2003	Haleakala	NEAT	ADE	3.7 km	MPC · JPL
114810	2003 OQ_{5}	—	July 24, 2003	Reedy Creek	J. Broughton	MAS	1.4 km	MPC · JPL
114811	2003 OR_{5}	—	July 24, 2003	Reedy Creek	J. Broughton	·	2.6 km	MPC · JPL
114812	2003 OU_{5}	—	July 24, 2003	Reedy Creek	J. Broughton	·	3.3 km	MPC · JPL
114813	2003 OB_{7}	—	July 24, 2003	Campo Imperatore	CINEOS	·	2.3 km	MPC · JPL
114814	2003 OG_{9}	—	July 23, 2003	Palomar	NEAT	·	7.2 km	MPC · JPL
114815	2003 OO_{9}	—	July 24, 2003	Campo Imperatore	CINEOS	·	2.9 km	MPC · JPL
114816	2003 OT_{9}	—	July 25, 2003	Socorro	LINEAR	·	5.9 km	MPC · JPL
114817	2003 OK_{10}	—	July 26, 2003	Palomar	NEAT	·	6.3 km	MPC · JPL
114818	2003 OR_{10}	—	July 27, 2003	Reedy Creek	J. Broughton	NYS	2.3 km	MPC · JPL
114819	2003 OU_{11}	—	July 20, 2003	Palomar	NEAT	·	3.3 km	MPC · JPL
114820	2003 OS_{12}	—	July 28, 2003	Palomar	NEAT	GAL	3.2 km	MPC · JPL
114821	2003 OC_{14}	—	July 28, 2003	Palomar	NEAT	·	6.6 km	MPC · JPL
114822	2003 ON_{15}	—	July 23, 2003	Palomar	NEAT	GAL	3.4 km	MPC · JPL
114823	2003 OB_{16}	—	July 23, 2003	Palomar	NEAT	EOS	5.1 km	MPC · JPL
114824	2003 OB_{17}	—	July 29, 2003	Campo Imperatore	CINEOS	·	1.2 km	MPC · JPL
114825	2003 OD_{17}	—	July 29, 2003	Campo Imperatore	CINEOS	HYG	5.6 km	MPC · JPL
114826	2003 OX_{17}	—	July 29, 2003	Reedy Creek	J. Broughton	NYS	2.6 km	MPC · JPL
114827	2003 OY_{18}	—	July 30, 2003	Palomar	NEAT	·	4.7 km	MPC · JPL
114828 Ricoromita	2003 OL_{20}	Ricoromita	July 30, 2003	Campo Imperatore	CINEOS	·	2.9 km	MPC · JPL
114829 Chierchia	2003 OC_{21}	Chierchia	July 23, 2003	Campo Imperatore	CINEOS	EUN	2.7 km	MPC · JPL
114830	2003 OX_{21}	—	July 29, 2003	Socorro	LINEAR	3:2 · SHU	12 km	MPC · JPL
114831	2003 OG_{22}	—	July 29, 2003	Socorro	LINEAR	GEF	2.8 km	MPC · JPL
114832	2003 OT_{22}	—	July 30, 2003	Socorro	LINEAR	·	1.4 km	MPC · JPL
114833	2003 OZ_{22}	—	July 30, 2003	Socorro	LINEAR	·	1.5 km	MPC · JPL
114834	2003 OB_{23}	—	July 30, 2003	Socorro	LINEAR	V	1.5 km	MPC · JPL
114835	2003 ON_{26}	—	July 24, 2003	Palomar	NEAT	EUN	1.7 km	MPC · JPL
114836	2003 OZ_{26}	—	July 24, 2003	Palomar	NEAT	·	1.9 km	MPC · JPL
114837	2003 OB_{28}	—	July 24, 2003	Palomar	NEAT	3:2	11 km	MPC · JPL
114838	2003 OD_{29}	—	July 24, 2003	Palomar	NEAT	·	2.5 km	MPC · JPL
114839	2003 OL_{29}	—	July 24, 2003	Palomar	NEAT	·	2.7 km	MPC · JPL
114840	2003 OK_{31}	—	July 30, 2003	Socorro	LINEAR	V	1.5 km	MPC · JPL
114841	2003 PF	—	August 1, 2003	Reedy Creek	J. Broughton	·	2.5 km	MPC · JPL
114842	2003 PF_{1}	—	August 1, 2003	Haleakala	NEAT	EOS	3.8 km	MPC · JPL
114843	2003 PW_{1}	—	August 1, 2003	Haleakala	NEAT	·	6.4 km	MPC · JPL
114844	2003 PZ_{1}	—	August 1, 2003	Haleakala	NEAT	·	1.7 km	MPC · JPL
114845	2003 PN_{2}	—	August 2, 2003	Haleakala	NEAT	·	2.1 km	MPC · JPL
114846	2003 PP_{3}	—	August 2, 2003	Haleakala	NEAT	·	1.5 km	MPC · JPL
114847	2003 PS_{3}	—	August 2, 2003	Haleakala	NEAT	·	2.2 km	MPC · JPL
114848	2003 PE_{4}	—	August 2, 2003	Haleakala	NEAT	·	2.2 km	MPC · JPL
114849	2003 PY_{4}	—	August 3, 2003	Haleakala	NEAT	·	1.4 km	MPC · JPL
114850	2003 PC_{5}	—	August 4, 2003	Socorro	LINEAR	·	5.5 km	MPC · JPL
114851	2003 PZ_{5}	—	August 1, 2003	Socorro	LINEAR	·	1.3 km	MPC · JPL
114852	2003 PL_{6}	—	August 1, 2003	Socorro	LINEAR	·	3.2 km	MPC · JPL
114853	2003 PM_{6}	—	August 1, 2003	Socorro	LINEAR	·	4.7 km	MPC · JPL
114854	2003 PY_{7}	—	August 2, 2003	Haleakala	NEAT	(5)	2.1 km	MPC · JPL
114855	2003 PH_{8}	—	August 2, 2003	Haleakala	NEAT	·	1.4 km	MPC · JPL
114856	2003 PP_{8}	—	August 4, 2003	Socorro	LINEAR	NYS	1.8 km	MPC · JPL
114857	2003 PE_{9}	—	August 4, 2003	Socorro	LINEAR	V	1.2 km	MPC · JPL
114858	2003 PO_{9}	—	August 4, 2003	Socorro	LINEAR	·	1.6 km	MPC · JPL
114859	2003 PK_{12}	—	August 7, 2003	Haleakala	NEAT	HNS	3.4 km	MPC · JPL
114860	2003 QB	—	July 24, 2003	Palomar	NEAT	·	1.3 km	MPC · JPL
114861	2003 QD	—	August 17, 2003	Needville	J. Dellinger, W. G. Dillon	·	2.9 km	MPC · JPL
114862	2003 QF_{1}	—	August 19, 2003	Campo Imperatore	CINEOS	·	3.2 km	MPC · JPL
114863	2003 QH_{1}	—	August 19, 2003	Campo Imperatore	CINEOS	·	4.8 km	MPC · JPL
114864	2003 QM_{1}	—	August 19, 2003	Campo Imperatore	CINEOS	·	3.2 km	MPC · JPL
114865	2003 QP_{2}	—	August 19, 2003	Campo Imperatore	CINEOS	HYG	5.3 km	MPC · JPL
114866	2003 QU_{2}	—	August 19, 2003	Campo Imperatore	CINEOS	·	3.4 km	MPC · JPL
114867	2003 QP_{3}	—	August 17, 2003	Haleakala	NEAT	·	4.5 km	MPC · JPL
114868	2003 QW_{5}	—	August 21, 2003	Modra	Gajdoš, S., Világi, J.	·	3.1 km	MPC · JPL
114869	2003 QX_{5}	—	August 18, 2003	Campo Imperatore	CINEOS	·	2.9 km	MPC · JPL
114870	2003 QF_{7}	—	August 20, 2003	Campo Imperatore	CINEOS	·	3.9 km	MPC · JPL
114871	2003 QH_{7}	—	August 21, 2003	Palomar	NEAT	·	3.4 km	MPC · JPL
114872	2003 QE_{8}	—	August 20, 2003	Palomar	NEAT	·	4.5 km	MPC · JPL
114873	2003 QZ_{9}	—	August 20, 2003	Reedy Creek	J. Broughton	·	4.0 km	MPC · JPL
114874	2003 QY_{10}	—	August 20, 2003	Campo Imperatore	CINEOS	·	2.0 km	MPC · JPL
114875	2003 QG_{11}	—	August 21, 2003	Needville	J. Dellinger, W. G. Dillon	·	2.4 km	MPC · JPL
114876	2003 QP_{11}	—	August 21, 2003	Haleakala	NEAT	·	4.3 km	MPC · JPL
114877	2003 QN_{12}	—	August 22, 2003	Haleakala	NEAT	·	2.5 km	MPC · JPL
114878	2003 QS_{12}	—	August 22, 2003	Socorro	LINEAR	GAL	3.0 km	MPC · JPL
114879	2003 QW_{12}	—	August 22, 2003	Haleakala	NEAT	·	3.7 km	MPC · JPL
114880	2003 QE_{13}	—	August 22, 2003	Haleakala	NEAT	·	4.1 km	MPC · JPL
114881	2003 QJ_{14}	—	August 20, 2003	Palomar	NEAT	·	9.3 km	MPC · JPL
114882	2003 QU_{14}	—	August 20, 2003	Palomar	NEAT	·	5.5 km	MPC · JPL
114883	2003 QV_{14}	—	August 20, 2003	Palomar	NEAT	V	1.2 km	MPC · JPL
114884	2003 QD_{15}	—	August 20, 2003	Palomar	NEAT	·	2.8 km	MPC · JPL
114885	2003 QG_{16}	—	August 20, 2003	Palomar	NEAT	·	4.4 km	MPC · JPL
114886	2003 QN_{16}	—	August 20, 2003	Campo Imperatore	CINEOS	·	3.5 km	MPC · JPL
114887	2003 QS_{16}	—	August 21, 2003	Palomar	NEAT	·	2.2 km	MPC · JPL
114888	2003 QT_{16}	—	August 21, 2003	Palomar	NEAT	·	2.8 km	MPC · JPL
114889	2003 QJ_{18}	—	August 22, 2003	Palomar	NEAT	·	1.5 km	MPC · JPL
114890	2003 QP_{19}	—	August 22, 2003	Palomar	NEAT	TIR	4.1 km	MPC · JPL
114891	2003 QD_{20}	—	August 22, 2003	Palomar	NEAT	·	5.4 km	MPC · JPL
114892	2003 QN_{20}	—	August 22, 2003	Palomar	NEAT	·	2.4 km	MPC · JPL
114893	2003 QR_{20}	—	August 22, 2003	Palomar	NEAT	·	5.0 km	MPC · JPL
114894	2003 QS_{20}	—	August 22, 2003	Palomar	NEAT	TIR	4.2 km	MPC · JPL
114895	2003 QG_{21}	—	August 22, 2003	Palomar	NEAT	·	4.1 km	MPC · JPL
114896	2003 QV_{21}	—	August 22, 2003	Palomar	NEAT	·	7.2 km	MPC · JPL
114897	2003 QX_{21}	—	August 20, 2003	Palomar	NEAT	·	5.1 km	MPC · JPL
114898	2003 QQ_{22}	—	August 20, 2003	Palomar	NEAT	·	4.2 km	MPC · JPL
114899	2003 QT_{23}	—	August 21, 2003	Haleakala	NEAT	·	5.7 km	MPC · JPL
114900	2003 QU_{24}	—	August 22, 2003	Campo Imperatore	CINEOS	EUN	2.9 km	MPC · JPL

== 114901–115000 ==
back to top

Designation			Discovery			Properties		Ref
Permanent	Provisional	Named after	Date	Site	Discoverer(s)	Category	Diam.	Ref
114901	2003 QK_{25}	—	August 22, 2003	Palomar	NEAT	·	3.2 km	MPC · JPL
114902	2003 QN_{25}	—	August 22, 2003	Palomar	NEAT	slow	4.6 km	MPC · JPL
114903	2003 QW_{25}	—	August 22, 2003	Palomar	NEAT	·	1.2 km	MPC · JPL
114904	2003 QX_{25}	—	August 22, 2003	Palomar	NEAT	·	1.5 km	MPC · JPL
114905	2003 QX_{26}	—	August 22, 2003	Haleakala	NEAT	·	4.1 km	MPC · JPL
114906	2003 QH_{27}	—	August 23, 2003	Palomar	NEAT	·	1.3 km	MPC · JPL
114907	2003 QK_{27}	—	August 23, 2003	Palomar	NEAT	·	7.1 km	MPC · JPL
114908	2003 QO_{27}	—	August 23, 2003	Socorro	LINEAR	·	3.7 km	MPC · JPL
114909	2003 QD_{28}	—	August 20, 2003	Palomar	NEAT	·	6.9 km	MPC · JPL
114910	2003 QA_{29}	—	August 24, 2003	Emerald Lane	L. Ball	DOR	5.3 km	MPC · JPL
114911	2003 QR_{30}	—	August 23, 2003	Socorro	LINEAR	BRA	3.6 km	MPC · JPL
114912	2003 QS_{30}	—	August 23, 2003	Socorro	LINEAR	H	1.4 km	MPC · JPL
114913	2003 QG_{33}	—	August 22, 2003	Socorro	LINEAR	NYS	2.3 km	MPC · JPL
114914	2003 QO_{34}	—	August 22, 2003	Palomar	NEAT	·	3.5 km	MPC · JPL
114915	2003 QU_{34}	—	August 22, 2003	Palomar	NEAT	EUN	2.1 km	MPC · JPL
114916	2003 QF_{36}	—	August 22, 2003	Socorro	LINEAR	·	2.4 km	MPC · JPL
114917	2003 QW_{36}	—	August 22, 2003	Socorro	LINEAR	·	4.2 km	MPC · JPL
114918	2003 QX_{36}	—	August 22, 2003	Socorro	LINEAR	V	1.2 km	MPC · JPL
114919	2003 QQ_{38}	—	August 22, 2003	Socorro	LINEAR	·	1.8 km	MPC · JPL
114920	2003 QX_{38}	—	August 22, 2003	Socorro	LINEAR	DOR	4.8 km	MPC · JPL
114921	2003 QA_{39}	—	August 22, 2003	Socorro	LINEAR	·	3.3 km	MPC · JPL
114922	2003 QB_{40}	—	August 22, 2003	Socorro	LINEAR	MAS	1.5 km	MPC · JPL
114923	2003 QL_{40}	—	August 22, 2003	Socorro	LINEAR	·	900 m	MPC · JPL
114924	2003 QL_{41}	—	August 22, 2003	Socorro	LINEAR	·	2.7 km	MPC · JPL
114925	2003 QX_{41}	—	August 22, 2003	Socorro	LINEAR	·	2.2 km	MPC · JPL
114926	2003 QW_{42}	—	August 22, 2003	Socorro	LINEAR	·	5.1 km	MPC · JPL
114927	2003 QZ_{42}	—	August 22, 2003	Palomar	NEAT	NYS	2.2 km	MPC · JPL
114928	2003 QB_{43}	—	August 22, 2003	Palomar	NEAT	·	3.2 km	MPC · JPL
114929	2003 QU_{43}	—	August 22, 2003	Haleakala	NEAT	·	2.8 km	MPC · JPL
114930	2003 QH_{44}	—	August 23, 2003	Palomar	NEAT	·	4.1 km	MPC · JPL
114931	2003 QG_{45}	—	August 23, 2003	Socorro	LINEAR	·	2.3 km	MPC · JPL
114932	2003 QM_{45}	—	August 23, 2003	Palomar	NEAT	·	2.5 km	MPC · JPL
114933	2003 QZ_{45}	—	August 23, 2003	Socorro	LINEAR	ERI	3.4 km	MPC · JPL
114934	2003 QX_{47}	—	August 20, 2003	Palomar	NEAT	·	3.0 km	MPC · JPL
114935	2003 QF_{50}	—	August 22, 2003	Palomar	NEAT	·	1.2 km	MPC · JPL
114936	2003 QH_{51}	—	August 22, 2003	Palomar	NEAT	·	2.2 km	MPC · JPL
114937	2003 QP_{51}	—	August 23, 2003	Palomar	NEAT	3:2	10 km	MPC · JPL
114938	2003 QW_{51}	—	August 23, 2003	Palomar	NEAT	·	6.7 km	MPC · JPL
114939	2003 QB_{52}	—	August 23, 2003	Palomar	NEAT	·	5.4 km	MPC · JPL
114940	2003 QH_{52}	—	August 23, 2003	Socorro	LINEAR	NYS	2.1 km	MPC · JPL
114941	2003 QB_{53}	—	August 23, 2003	Socorro	LINEAR	·	2.2 km	MPC · JPL
114942	2003 QJ_{53}	—	August 23, 2003	Socorro	LINEAR	NYS	2.4 km	MPC · JPL
114943	2003 QT_{53}	—	August 23, 2003	Socorro	LINEAR	NYS	2.2 km	MPC · JPL
114944	2003 QU_{53}	—	August 23, 2003	Socorro	LINEAR	·	2.1 km	MPC · JPL
114945	2003 QO_{54}	—	August 23, 2003	Socorro	LINEAR	DOR	4.7 km	MPC · JPL
114946	2003 QQ_{54}	—	August 23, 2003	Socorro	LINEAR	·	1.9 km	MPC · JPL
114947	2003 QR_{54}	—	August 23, 2003	Socorro	LINEAR	·	2.7 km	MPC · JPL
114948	2003 QU_{54}	—	August 23, 2003	Socorro	LINEAR	NYS	2.0 km	MPC · JPL
114949	2003 QX_{54}	—	August 23, 2003	Socorro	LINEAR	·	1.7 km	MPC · JPL
114950	2003 QC_{55}	—	August 23, 2003	Socorro	LINEAR	·	2.4 km	MPC · JPL
114951	2003 QL_{55}	—	August 23, 2003	Socorro	LINEAR	·	2.6 km	MPC · JPL
114952	2003 QA_{57}	—	August 23, 2003	Socorro	LINEAR	KOR	3.2 km	MPC · JPL
114953	2003 QD_{57}	—	August 23, 2003	Socorro	LINEAR	·	1.5 km	MPC · JPL
114954	2003 QE_{57}	—	August 23, 2003	Socorro	LINEAR	T_{j} (2.98) · 3:2	8.4 km	MPC · JPL
114955	2003 QF_{57}	—	August 23, 2003	Socorro	LINEAR	·	3.9 km	MPC · JPL
114956	2003 QG_{59}	—	August 23, 2003	Socorro	LINEAR	·	2.7 km	MPC · JPL
114957	2003 QB_{60}	—	August 23, 2003	Socorro	LINEAR	NYS	2.2 km	MPC · JPL
114958	2003 QO_{60}	—	August 23, 2003	Socorro	LINEAR	·	3.8 km	MPC · JPL
114959	2003 QQ_{60}	—	August 23, 2003	Socorro	LINEAR	·	1.8 km	MPC · JPL
114960	2003 QZ_{60}	—	August 23, 2003	Socorro	LINEAR	·	4.4 km	MPC · JPL
114961	2003 QD_{61}	—	August 23, 2003	Socorro	LINEAR	·	2.8 km	MPC · JPL
114962	2003 QM_{61}	—	August 23, 2003	Socorro	LINEAR	·	3.9 km	MPC · JPL
114963	2003 QN_{61}	—	August 23, 2003	Socorro	LINEAR	·	1.4 km	MPC · JPL
114964	2003 QQ_{61}	—	August 23, 2003	Socorro	LINEAR	EOS	5.2 km	MPC · JPL
114965	2003 QR_{61}	—	August 23, 2003	Socorro	LINEAR	·	3.1 km	MPC · JPL
114966	2003 QY_{61}	—	August 23, 2003	Socorro	LINEAR	·	2.5 km	MPC · JPL
114967	2003 QM_{62}	—	August 23, 2003	Socorro	LINEAR	EUN	2.4 km	MPC · JPL
114968	2003 QO_{62}	—	August 23, 2003	Socorro	LINEAR	·	6.6 km	MPC · JPL
114969	2003 QQ_{62}	—	August 23, 2003	Socorro	LINEAR	HYG	8.0 km	MPC · JPL
114970	2003 QS_{62}	—	August 23, 2003	Socorro	LINEAR	·	2.4 km	MPC · JPL
114971	2003 QX_{62}	—	August 23, 2003	Socorro	LINEAR	KOR	3.1 km	MPC · JPL
114972	2003 QV_{63}	—	August 23, 2003	Socorro	LINEAR	·	3.3 km	MPC · JPL
114973	2003 QZ_{63}	—	August 23, 2003	Socorro	LINEAR	·	1.6 km	MPC · JPL
114974	2003 QA_{64}	—	August 23, 2003	Socorro	LINEAR	·	5.5 km	MPC · JPL
114975	2003 QD_{64}	—	August 23, 2003	Socorro	LINEAR	GEF	2.9 km	MPC · JPL
114976	2003 QL_{64}	—	August 23, 2003	Socorro	LINEAR	·	3.0 km	MPC · JPL
114977	2003 QQ_{64}	—	August 23, 2003	Socorro	LINEAR	GEF	3.2 km	MPC · JPL
114978	2003 QS_{64}	—	August 23, 2003	Socorro	LINEAR	·	9.5 km	MPC · JPL
114979	2003 QV_{64}	—	August 23, 2003	Socorro	LINEAR	·	3.5 km	MPC · JPL
114980	2003 QY_{64}	—	August 23, 2003	Socorro	LINEAR	·	7.3 km	MPC · JPL
114981	2003 QZ_{64}	—	August 23, 2003	Palomar	NEAT	·	2.3 km	MPC · JPL
114982	2003 QP_{65}	—	August 25, 2003	Palomar	NEAT	ERI	4.1 km	MPC · JPL
114983	2003 QC_{66}	—	August 22, 2003	Socorro	LINEAR	NYS	1.7 km	MPC · JPL
114984	2003 QL_{66}	—	August 22, 2003	Socorro	LINEAR	·	2.9 km	MPC · JPL
114985	2003 QH_{67}	—	August 23, 2003	Socorro	LINEAR	·	2.6 km	MPC · JPL
114986	2003 QO_{67}	—	August 24, 2003	Socorro	LINEAR	·	2.7 km	MPC · JPL
114987 Tittel	2003 QW_{68}	Tittel	August 26, 2003	Piszkéstető	K. Sárneczky, B. Sipőcz	THM	4.4 km	MPC · JPL
114988	2003 QP_{69}	—	August 24, 2003	Socorro	LINEAR	·	5.9 km	MPC · JPL
114989	2003 QQ_{69}	—	August 24, 2003	Socorro	LINEAR	·	6.1 km	MPC · JPL
114990 Szeidl	2003 QV_{69}	Szeidl	August 26, 2003	Piszkéstető	K. Sárneczky, B. Sipőcz	·	1.9 km	MPC · JPL
114991 Balázs	2003 QY_{69}	Balázs	August 26, 2003	Piszkéstető	K. Sárneczky, B. Sipőcz	·	4.6 km	MPC · JPL
114992	2003 QG_{70}	—	August 20, 2003	Bergisch Gladbach	W. Bickel	·	1.7 km	MPC · JPL
114993	2003 QK_{70}	—	August 24, 2003	Bergisch Gladbach	W. Bickel	·	1.2 km	MPC · JPL
114994	2003 QP_{70}	—	August 23, 2003	Socorro	LINEAR	·	2.5 km	MPC · JPL
114995	2003 QY_{71}	—	August 25, 2003	Palomar	NEAT	·	4.7 km	MPC · JPL
114996	2003 QL_{72}	—	August 23, 2003	Palomar	NEAT	PHO	2.5 km	MPC · JPL
114997	2003 QA_{73}	—	August 24, 2003	Socorro	LINEAR	3:2	11 km	MPC · JPL
114998	2003 QD_{74}	—	August 24, 2003	Socorro	LINEAR	·	1.6 km	MPC · JPL
114999	2003 QR_{74}	—	August 24, 2003	Socorro	LINEAR	·	3.5 km	MPC · JPL
115000	2003 QD_{75}	—	August 24, 2003	Socorro	LINEAR	·	7.1 km	MPC · JPL

back to top

== See also ==
- Meanings of minor-planet names: 114001–115000
