= List of minor planets: 700001–701000 =

The following is a partial list of minor planets, running from minor-planet number 700001 through 701000, inclusive. The primary data for this and other partial lists is based on JPL's "Small-Body Orbital Elements" and data available from the Minor Planet Center. Critical list information is also provided by the MPC, unless otherwise specified from Lowell Observatory. A detailed description of the table's columns and additional sources are given on the main page including a complete list of every page in this series, and a statistical break-up on the dynamical classification of minor planets.

Also see the summary list of all named bodies in numerical and alphabetical order, and the corresponding naming citations for the number range of this particular list. New namings may only be added to this list after official publication, as the preannouncement of names is condemned by the Working Group for Small Bodies Nomenclature of the International Astronomical Union.

Near-Earth obj.	MBA (inner)	MBA (outer)	Centaur
Mars-crosser	MBA (middle)	Jupiter trojan	Trans-Neptunian obj.
Unclassified

== 700001–700100 ==
Designation			Discovery			Properties		Ref
Permanent	Provisional	Named after	Date	Site	Discoverer(s)	Category	Diam.	Ref
700001	1995 BE_{15}	—	January 31, 1995	Kitt Peak	Spacewatch	·	1.6 km	MPC · JPL
700002	1995 DW_{7}	—	February 24, 1995	Kitt Peak	Spacewatch	·	1.9 km	MPC · JPL
700003	1995 GV_{1}	—	April 1, 1995	Kitt Peak	Spacewatch	·	2.8 km	MPC · JPL
700004	1995 OW_{15}	—	July 30, 1995	Kitt Peak	Spacewatch	·	1.5 km	MPC · JPL
700005	1995 OV_{18}	—	June 20, 2013	Haleakala	Pan-STARRS 1	JUN	910 m	MPC · JPL
700006	1995 QK_{7}	—	August 25, 1995	Kitt Peak	Spacewatch	·	1.2 km	MPC · JPL
700007	1995 QU_{15}	—	August 31, 1995	Kitt Peak	Spacewatch	·	860 m	MPC · JPL
700008	1995 SB_{14}	—	September 18, 1995	Kitt Peak	Spacewatch	·	1.7 km	MPC · JPL
700009	1995 SU_{46}	—	September 26, 1995	Kitt Peak	Spacewatch	·	1.1 km	MPC · JPL
700010	1995 SC_{56}	—	September 22, 1995	Kitt Peak	Spacewatch	HOF	1.8 km	MPC · JPL
700011	1995 SP_{60}	—	September 25, 1995	Kitt Peak	Spacewatch	HNS	900 m	MPC · JPL
700012	1995 SL_{75}	—	September 20, 1995	Kitt Peak	Spacewatch	·	500 m	MPC · JPL
700013	1995 SK_{84}	—	September 25, 1995	Kitt Peak	Spacewatch	KOR	1.0 km	MPC · JPL
700014	1995 SK_{86}	—	September 26, 1995	Kitt Peak	Spacewatch	(5)	840 m	MPC · JPL
700015	1995 TP_{11}	—	October 15, 1995	Kitt Peak	Spacewatch	·	970 m	MPC · JPL
700016	1995 UL_{42}	—	October 24, 1995	Kitt Peak	Spacewatch	KOR	1.3 km	MPC · JPL
700017	1995 UE_{60}	—	July 25, 2014	Haleakala	Pan-STARRS 1	KOR	1.0 km	MPC · JPL
700018	1995 UY_{60}	—	October 24, 1995	Kitt Peak	Spacewatch	·	980 m	MPC · JPL
700019	1995 UD_{80}	—	October 24, 1995	Kitt Peak	Spacewatch	AEO	740 m	MPC · JPL
700020	1995 WC_{15}	—	November 17, 1995	Kitt Peak	Spacewatch	·	1.3 km	MPC · JPL
700021	1995 XL_{4}	—	December 14, 1995	Kitt Peak	Spacewatch	EUN	1.0 km	MPC · JPL
700022	1996 AJ_{19}	—	January 15, 1996	Kitt Peak	Spacewatch	·	2.2 km	MPC · JPL
700023	1996 AO_{19}	—	January 15, 1996	Kitt Peak	Spacewatch	·	1.4 km	MPC · JPL
700024	1996 BZ_{5}	—	January 12, 1996	Kitt Peak	Spacewatch	·	1.7 km	MPC · JPL
700025	1996 CS_{3}	—	February 10, 1996	Kitt Peak	Spacewatch	·	2.0 km	MPC · JPL
700026	1996 EO_{5}	—	March 11, 1996	Kitt Peak	Spacewatch	·	1.6 km	MPC · JPL
700027	1996 JW_{15}	—	May 15, 1996	Kitt Peak	Spacewatch	·	650 m	MPC · JPL
700028	1996 RM_{10}	—	September 8, 1996	Kitt Peak	Spacewatch	THM	2.1 km	MPC · JPL
700029	1996 RZ_{14}	—	September 11, 1996	Kitt Peak	Spacewatch	·	1.1 km	MPC · JPL
700030	1996 RD_{17}	—	September 13, 1996	Kitt Peak	Spacewatch	·	2.6 km	MPC · JPL
700031	1996 TZ_{27}	—	October 7, 1996	Kitt Peak	Spacewatch	·	2.3 km	MPC · JPL
700032	1996 TU_{30}	—	October 8, 1996	Kitt Peak	Spacewatch	·	880 m	MPC · JPL
700033	1996 VP_{13}	—	November 5, 1996	Kitt Peak	Spacewatch	·	620 m	MPC · JPL
700034	1996 VY_{19}	—	November 8, 1996	Kitt Peak	Spacewatch	·	2.1 km	MPC · JPL
700035	1996 VE_{26}	—	November 10, 1996	Kitt Peak	Spacewatch	·	910 m	MPC · JPL
700036	1996 VO_{26}	—	November 11, 1996	Kitt Peak	Spacewatch	·	1.2 km	MPC · JPL
700037	1996 VX_{34}	—	November 8, 1996	Kitt Peak	Spacewatch	MAS	610 m	MPC · JPL
700038	1996 VE_{42}	—	November 17, 2004	Campo Imperatore	CINEOS	T_{j} (2.98) · 3:2	3.7 km	MPC · JPL
700039	1996 VH_{42}	—	January 23, 2015	Haleakala	Pan-STARRS 1	HNS	1.1 km	MPC · JPL
700040	1997 AZ_{11}	—	January 9, 1997	Kitt Peak	Spacewatch	·	1.2 km	MPC · JPL
700041	1997 CJ_{24}	—	February 9, 1997	Kitt Peak	Spacewatch	PHO	600 m	MPC · JPL
700042	1997 GK_{2}	—	April 7, 1997	Kitt Peak	Spacewatch	·	910 m	MPC · JPL
700043	1997 KP_{4}	—	May 30, 1997	Kitt Peak	Spacewatch	·	940 m	MPC · JPL
700044	1997 NF_{6}	—	July 10, 1997	Kitt Peak	Spacewatch	·	600 m	MPC · JPL
700045	1997 SB_{7}	—	September 23, 1997	Kitt Peak	Spacewatch	·	1.1 km	MPC · JPL
700046	1997 SW_{11}	—	September 27, 1997	Kitt Peak	Spacewatch	·	1.0 km	MPC · JPL
700047	1997 TD_{20}	—	October 3, 1997	Kitt Peak	Spacewatch	·	1.5 km	MPC · JPL
700048	1997 TA_{23}	—	October 6, 1997	Kitt Peak	Spacewatch	MIS	1.8 km	MPC · JPL
700049	1997 UN_{13}	—	October 23, 1997	Kitt Peak	Spacewatch	·	740 m	MPC · JPL
700050	1997 UV_{15}	—	October 23, 1997	Kitt Peak	Spacewatch	·	700 m	MPC · JPL
700051	1997 UX_{15}	—	October 23, 1997	Kitt Peak	Spacewatch	GEF	890 m	MPC · JPL
700052	1997 UF_{23}	—	October 27, 1997	Anderson Mesa	B. A. Skiff	EOS	1.7 km	MPC · JPL
700053	1997 XR_{14}	—	October 15, 2014	Kitt Peak	Spacewatch	·	2.4 km	MPC · JPL
700054	1998 BN_{50}	—	January 13, 2005	Kitt Peak	Spacewatch	·	1.0 km	MPC · JPL
700055	1998 DY_{27}	—	February 23, 1998	Kitt Peak	Spacewatch	GEF	1.1 km	MPC · JPL
700056	1998 HJ_{11}	—	April 18, 1998	Kitt Peak	Spacewatch	·	1.0 km	MPC · JPL
700057	1998 HE_{15}	—	April 19, 1998	Kitt Peak	Spacewatch	·	960 m	MPC · JPL
700058	1998 HG_{159}	—	June 16, 2012	Haleakala	Pan-STARRS 1	·	1.5 km	MPC · JPL
700059	1998 KD_{11}	—	May 3, 1998	Kitt Peak	Spacewatch	·	1.0 km	MPC · JPL
700060	1998 MR	—	June 17, 1998	Kitt Peak	Spacewatch	·	960 m	MPC · JPL
700061	1998 QF_{112}	—	July 13, 2013	Mount Lemmon	Mount Lemmon Survey	V	440 m	MPC · JPL
700062	1998 QJ_{112}	—	March 22, 2014	Mount Lemmon	Mount Lemmon Survey	HNS	930 m	MPC · JPL
700063	1998 RL_{14}	—	October 11, 2010	Mount Lemmon	Mount Lemmon Survey	·	2.3 km	MPC · JPL
700064	1998 SC_{50}	—	September 25, 1998	Kitt Peak	Spacewatch	·	1.5 km	MPC · JPL
700065	1998 SS_{176}	—	September 25, 1998	Apache Point	SDSS	·	2.4 km	MPC · JPL
700066	1998 SS_{177}	—	September 14, 2013	Haleakala	Pan-STARRS 1	·	1.3 km	MPC · JPL
700067	1998 SY_{177}	—	April 29, 2012	Mount Lemmon	Mount Lemmon Survey	·	1.2 km	MPC · JPL
700068	1998 SF_{178}	—	April 15, 2001	Kitt Peak	Spacewatch	KOR	1.3 km	MPC · JPL
700069	1998 SU_{178}	—	September 19, 2009	Kitt Peak	Spacewatch	·	810 m	MPC · JPL
700070	1998 SM_{179}	—	July 14, 2013	Haleakala	Pan-STARRS 1	·	960 m	MPC · JPL
700071	1998 SZ_{180}	—	August 10, 2007	Kitt Peak	Spacewatch	·	1.4 km	MPC · JPL
700072	1998 TU_{4}	—	October 1, 1998	Kitt Peak	Spacewatch	·	2.1 km	MPC · JPL
700073	1998 TR_{29}	—	October 15, 1998	Kitt Peak	Spacewatch	L4	9.3 km	MPC · JPL
700074	1998 TE_{36}	—	October 20, 1998	Kitt Peak	Spacewatch	·	1.0 km	MPC · JPL
700075	1998 TV_{38}	—	January 1, 2014	Haleakala	Pan-STARRS 1	·	650 m	MPC · JPL
700076	1998 UF_{13}	—	October 14, 1998	Kitt Peak	Spacewatch	·	1.6 km	MPC · JPL
700077	1998 UF_{45}	—	October 23, 1998	Kitt Peak	Spacewatch	·	1.6 km	MPC · JPL
700078	1998 WL_{37}	—	November 14, 1998	Kitt Peak	Spacewatch	·	1.6 km	MPC · JPL
700079	1998 WP_{46}	—	November 1, 2008	Mount Lemmon	Mount Lemmon Survey	·	520 m	MPC · JPL
700080	1999 AY_{36}	—	January 13, 1999	Mauna Kea	Anderson, J., Veillet, C.	NYS	820 m	MPC · JPL
700081	1999 CH_{130}	—	January 16, 1999	Kitt Peak	Spacewatch	MIS	2.3 km	MPC · JPL
700082	1999 EN_{15}	—	March 29, 2012	Kitt Peak	Spacewatch	EUN	1.0 km	MPC · JPL
700083	1999 ER_{15}	—	March 17, 2013	Mount Lemmon	Mount Lemmon Survey	·	520 m	MPC · JPL
700084	1999 FF_{97}	—	March 19, 1999	Kitt Peak	Spacewatch	·	1.7 km	MPC · JPL
700085	1999 FP_{98}	—	May 7, 2010	Mount Lemmon	Mount Lemmon Survey	EOS	1.5 km	MPC · JPL
700086	1999 FV_{98}	—	June 18, 2013	Haleakala	Pan-STARRS 1	·	590 m	MPC · JPL
700087	1999 FB_{99}	—	July 24, 2003	Palomar	NEAT	·	530 m	MPC · JPL
700088	1999 FP_{99}	—	February 27, 2015	Haleakala	Pan-STARRS 1	·	740 m	MPC · JPL
700089	1999 FS_{99}	—	September 29, 2011	Mount Lemmon	Mount Lemmon Survey	·	1.6 km	MPC · JPL
700090	1999 FT_{100}	—	September 20, 2007	Kitt Peak	Spacewatch	·	2.1 km	MPC · JPL
700091	1999 FW_{100}	—	October 18, 2004	Kitt Peak	Deep Ecliptic Survey	·	590 m	MPC · JPL
700092	1999 FZ_{100}	—	January 2, 2016	Mount Lemmon	Mount Lemmon Survey	·	780 m	MPC · JPL
700093	1999 FG_{101}	—	October 2, 2006	Mount Lemmon	Mount Lemmon Survey	AGN	1.1 km	MPC · JPL
700094 Anunciação	1999 PG_{4}	Anunciação	August 12, 1999	Serra da Piedade	C. Jacques, L. Duczmal	·	1.2 km	MPC · JPL
700095	1999 PO_{9}	—	December 27, 2006	Mount Lemmon	Mount Lemmon Survey	EOS	1.6 km	MPC · JPL
700096	1999 RJ_{8}	—	September 4, 1999	Kitt Peak	Spacewatch	MAS	620 m	MPC · JPL
700097	1999 RQ_{8}	—	September 4, 1999	Kitt Peak	Spacewatch	·	940 m	MPC · JPL
700098	1999 RY_{259}	—	December 2, 2008	Catalina	CSS	·	1.7 km	MPC · JPL
700099	1999 RD_{260}	—	October 14, 2010	Mount Lemmon	Mount Lemmon Survey	·	790 m	MPC · JPL
700100	1999 RH_{260}	—	August 17, 1999	Kitt Peak	Spacewatch	·	1.2 km	MPC · JPL

== 700101–700200 ==
back to top

Designation			Discovery			Properties		Ref
Permanent	Provisional	Named after	Date	Site	Discoverer(s)	Category	Diam.	Ref
700101	1999 TR_{68}	—	October 9, 1999	Kitt Peak	Spacewatch	·	1.5 km	MPC · JPL
700102	1999 TX_{84}	—	October 13, 1999	Kitt Peak	Spacewatch	·	1.2 km	MPC · JPL
700103	1999 TJ_{87}	—	October 15, 1999	Kitt Peak	Spacewatch	·	1.6 km	MPC · JPL
700104	1999 TG_{239}	—	October 4, 1999	Kitt Peak	Spacewatch	NYS	1.0 km	MPC · JPL
700105	1999 TY_{305}	—	October 5, 1999	Kitt Peak	Spacewatch	·	1.3 km	MPC · JPL
700106	1999 TF_{307}	—	October 3, 1999	Kitt Peak	Spacewatch	·	810 m	MPC · JPL
700107	1999 TO_{314}	—	October 11, 1999	Kitt Peak	Spacewatch	·	1.7 km	MPC · JPL
700108	1999 TF_{318}	—	October 12, 1999	Kitt Peak	Spacewatch	·	1.4 km	MPC · JPL
700109	1999 TA_{328}	—	October 2, 1999	Catalina	CSS	·	1.1 km	MPC · JPL
700110	1999 TC_{338}	—	September 25, 2006	Mount Lemmon	Mount Lemmon Survey	·	660 m	MPC · JPL
700111	1999 TE_{338}	—	October 9, 1999	Kitt Peak	Spacewatch	·	930 m	MPC · JPL
700112	1999 TQ_{338}	—	December 10, 2009	Mount Lemmon	Mount Lemmon Survey	·	570 m	MPC · JPL
700113	1999 TE_{339}	—	September 17, 2010	Mount Lemmon	Mount Lemmon Survey	·	830 m	MPC · JPL
700114	1999 TY_{339}	—	October 13, 2016	Haleakala	Pan-STARRS 1	·	2.1 km	MPC · JPL
700115	1999 TP_{340}	—	September 13, 2013	Kitt Peak	Spacewatch	·	750 m	MPC · JPL
700116	1999 TX_{340}	—	January 18, 2004	Kitt Peak	Spacewatch	·	920 m	MPC · JPL
700117	1999 TA_{341}	—	September 18, 2010	Mount Lemmon	Mount Lemmon Survey	·	1.0 km	MPC · JPL
700118	1999 TQ_{341}	—	January 20, 2017	Haleakala	Pan-STARRS 1	EUN	1.2 km	MPC · JPL
700119	1999 TT_{341}	—	September 7, 2004	Kitt Peak	Spacewatch	·	2.0 km	MPC · JPL
700120	1999 TF_{342}	—	August 30, 2014	Mount Lemmon	Mount Lemmon Survey	·	1.4 km	MPC · JPL
700121	1999 TM_{342}	—	January 8, 2009	Kitt Peak	Spacewatch	(5)	970 m	MPC · JPL
700122	1999 TN_{342}	—	August 2, 2011	Haleakala	Pan-STARRS 1	L5	7.8 km	MPC · JPL
700123	1999 TK_{343}	—	October 6, 1999	Kitt Peak	Spacewatch	(5)	850 m	MPC · JPL
700124	1999 UJ_{59}	—	October 31, 1999	Kitt Peak	Spacewatch	·	900 m	MPC · JPL
700125	1999 UF_{65}	—	October 11, 1999	Kitt Peak	Spacewatch	·	830 m	MPC · JPL
700126	1999 UK_{65}	—	February 9, 2008	Mount Lemmon	Mount Lemmon Survey	MAS	620 m	MPC · JPL
700127	1999 UV_{65}	—	March 31, 2009	Mount Lemmon	Mount Lemmon Survey	·	850 m	MPC · JPL
700128	1999 UW_{66}	—	October 19, 1999	Kitt Peak	Spacewatch	·	1.9 km	MPC · JPL
700129	1999 VU_{75}	—	November 5, 1999	Kitt Peak	Spacewatch	MAS	530 m	MPC · JPL
700130	1999 VZ_{119}	—	November 3, 1999	Kitt Peak	Spacewatch	NYS	900 m	MPC · JPL
700131	1999 VW_{130}	—	November 9, 1999	Kitt Peak	Spacewatch	HOF	1.9 km	MPC · JPL
700132	1999 VW_{207}	—	November 9, 1999	Kitt Peak	Spacewatch	·	1.4 km	MPC · JPL
700133	1999 VE_{217}	—	November 4, 1999	Kitt Peak	Spacewatch	·	1.6 km	MPC · JPL
700134	1999 VY_{221}	—	November 3, 1999	Kitt Peak	Spacewatch	·	830 m	MPC · JPL
700135	1999 VJ_{232}	—	September 26, 2006	Mount Lemmon	Mount Lemmon Survey	·	650 m	MPC · JPL
700136	1999 VK_{232}	—	October 27, 2014	Haleakala	Pan-STARRS 1	·	2.0 km	MPC · JPL
700137	1999 VQ_{232}	—	November 10, 2016	Haleakala	Pan-STARRS 1	·	2.0 km	MPC · JPL
700138	1999 VS_{232}	—	October 9, 2012	Haleakala	Pan-STARRS 1	·	1.4 km	MPC · JPL
700139	1999 VV_{232}	—	September 20, 2003	Kitt Peak	Spacewatch	·	1.0 km	MPC · JPL
700140	1999 VW_{232}	—	October 31, 2010	Mount Lemmon	Mount Lemmon Survey	·	1.1 km	MPC · JPL
700141	1999 WK_{25}	—	November 29, 1999	Kitt Peak	Spacewatch	·	1.3 km	MPC · JPL
700142	1999 WH_{28}	—	June 11, 2015	Haleakala	Pan-STARRS 1	·	1.4 km	MPC · JPL
700143	1999 WW_{28}	—	September 10, 2010	Kitt Peak	Spacewatch	·	920 m	MPC · JPL
700144	1999 WX_{28}	—	December 6, 2015	Haleakala	Pan-STARRS 1	·	560 m	MPC · JPL
700145	1999 WA_{29}	—	May 20, 2014	Haleakala	Pan-STARRS 1	·	740 m	MPC · JPL
700146	1999 XN_{2}	—	December 3, 1999	Kitt Peak	Spacewatch	H	520 m	MPC · JPL
700147	1999 XW_{149}	—	December 8, 1999	Kitt Peak	Spacewatch	·	1.5 km	MPC · JPL
700148	1999 XE_{228}	—	December 5, 1999	Kitt Peak	Spacewatch	·	2.3 km	MPC · JPL
700149	1999 XK_{253}	—	December 12, 1999	Kitt Peak	Spacewatch	·	1.6 km	MPC · JPL
700150	1999 XX_{265}	—	December 6, 1999	Kitt Peak	Spacewatch	·	930 m	MPC · JPL
700151	1999 XD_{266}	—	April 21, 2014	Mount Lemmon	Mount Lemmon Survey	·	450 m	MPC · JPL
700152	1999 XH_{266}	—	July 23, 2015	Haleakala	Pan-STARRS 1	(5)	900 m	MPC · JPL
700153	1999 YD_{2}	—	December 20, 1995	Kitt Peak	Spacewatch	·	1.0 km	MPC · JPL
700154	1999 YD_{16}	—	December 31, 1999	Kitt Peak	Spacewatch	·	1.4 km	MPC · JPL
700155	2000 AO_{217}	—	January 3, 2000	Kitt Peak	Spacewatch	THB	2.9 km	MPC · JPL
700156	2000 AA_{220}	—	December 31, 1999	Kitt Peak	Spacewatch	·	1.3 km	MPC · JPL
700157	2000 AO_{226}	—	January 12, 2000	Kitt Peak	Spacewatch	·	1.3 km	MPC · JPL
700158	2000 AM_{258}	—	January 11, 2000	Kitt Peak	Spacewatch	·	530 m	MPC · JPL
700159	2000 AP_{258}	—	December 17, 1999	Kitt Peak	Spacewatch	·	2.1 km	MPC · JPL
700160	2000 AS_{258}	—	January 17, 2007	Kitt Peak	Spacewatch	·	850 m	MPC · JPL
700161	2000 AL_{259}	—	December 16, 2009	Mount Lemmon	Mount Lemmon Survey	·	2.0 km	MPC · JPL
700162	2000 BG_{39}	—	January 27, 2000	Kitt Peak	Spacewatch	·	1.9 km	MPC · JPL
700163	2000 BR_{50}	—	January 16, 2000	Kitt Peak	Spacewatch	EOS	1.4 km	MPC · JPL
700164	2000 BH_{53}	—	May 23, 2014	Haleakala	Pan-STARRS 1	·	1.4 km	MPC · JPL
700165	2000 CF_{72}	—	February 7, 2000	Kitt Peak	Spacewatch	EOS	1.3 km	MPC · JPL
700166	2000 CC_{106}	—	February 7, 2000	Kitt Peak	Spacewatch	·	730 m	MPC · JPL
700167	2000 CD_{106}	—	February 7, 2000	Kitt Peak	Spacewatch	·	740 m	MPC · JPL
700168	2000 CE_{127}	—	February 1, 2000	Kitt Peak	Spacewatch	·	1.6 km	MPC · JPL
700169	2000 CX_{129}	—	February 3, 2000	Kitt Peak	Spacewatch	·	2.4 km	MPC · JPL
700170	2000 CR_{130}	—	February 1, 2000	Kitt Peak	Spacewatch	PHO	680 m	MPC · JPL
700171	2000 CZ_{132}	—	February 4, 2000	Kitt Peak	Spacewatch	·	960 m	MPC · JPL
700172	2000 CR_{137}	—	February 4, 2000	Kitt Peak	Spacewatch	·	2.0 km	MPC · JPL
700173	2000 CD_{142}	—	February 3, 2000	Socorro	LINEAR	·	1.5 km	MPC · JPL
700174	2000 CL_{144}	—	February 6, 2000	Kitt Peak	Spacewatch	EOS	1.8 km	MPC · JPL
700175	2000 CB_{154}	—	September 23, 2008	Kitt Peak	Spacewatch	·	2.7 km	MPC · JPL
700176	2000 CC_{154}	—	February 8, 2013	XuYi	PMO NEO Survey Program	·	1.7 km	MPC · JPL
700177	2000 CW_{154}	—	January 26, 2017	Haleakala	Pan-STARRS 1	·	2.1 km	MPC · JPL
700178	2000 CK_{155}	—	February 6, 2013	Kitt Peak	Spacewatch	·	1.6 km	MPC · JPL
700179	2000 CR_{155}	—	May 19, 2014	Haleakala	Pan-STARRS 1	·	1.7 km	MPC · JPL
700180	2000 CV_{155}	—	February 8, 2011	Mount Lemmon	Mount Lemmon Survey	EOS	1.6 km	MPC · JPL
700181	2000 CU_{156}	—	March 12, 2011	Mount Lemmon	Mount Lemmon Survey	EOS	1.4 km	MPC · JPL
700182	2000 CE_{157}	—	July 14, 2013	Haleakala	Pan-STARRS 1	·	2.4 km	MPC · JPL
700183	2000 DO_{118}	—	July 26, 2017	Haleakala	Pan-STARRS 1	·	940 m	MPC · JPL
700184	2000 ED_{22}	—	March 2, 2000	Kitt Peak	Spacewatch	·	840 m	MPC · JPL
700185	2000 ET_{51}	—	March 3, 2000	Kitt Peak	Spacewatch	AGN	970 m	MPC · JPL
700186	2000 EQ_{71}	—	March 9, 2000	Kitt Peak	Spacewatch	·	2.4 km	MPC · JPL
700187	2000 EA_{209}	—	August 6, 2012	Haleakala	Pan-STARRS 1	·	1.0 km	MPC · JPL
700188	2000 EV_{209}	—	January 10, 2007	Mount Lemmon	Mount Lemmon Survey	CLA	1.3 km	MPC · JPL
700189	2000 EN_{210}	—	September 15, 2006	Kitt Peak	Spacewatch	·	1.4 km	MPC · JPL
700190	2000 EO_{210}	—	July 14, 2013	Haleakala	Pan-STARRS 1	·	1.7 km	MPC · JPL
700191	2000 ER_{210}	—	September 23, 2008	Kitt Peak	Spacewatch	EOS	1.6 km	MPC · JPL
700192	2000 ED_{211}	—	February 24, 2017	Mount Lemmon	Mount Lemmon Survey	·	3.4 km	MPC · JPL
700193	2000 EF_{211}	—	February 25, 2017	Haleakala	Pan-STARRS 1	·	2.4 km	MPC · JPL
700194	2000 EM_{211}	—	February 12, 2011	Mount Lemmon	Mount Lemmon Survey	·	2.3 km	MPC · JPL
700195	2000 ES_{211}	—	November 14, 2007	Kitt Peak	Spacewatch	·	1.6 km	MPC · JPL
700196	2000 EB_{212}	—	March 20, 2014	Mount Lemmon	Mount Lemmon Survey	·	1.5 km	MPC · JPL
700197	2000 FM_{64}	—	March 29, 2000	Kitt Peak	Spacewatch	·	900 m	MPC · JPL
700198	2000 FU_{64}	—	March 30, 2000	Kitt Peak	Spacewatch	·	2.8 km	MPC · JPL
700199	2000 GX_{120}	—	December 23, 2006	Mount Lemmon	Mount Lemmon Survey	·	900 m	MPC · JPL
700200	2000 GX_{184}	—	May 11, 2015	Mount Lemmon	Mount Lemmon Survey	MAS	530 m	MPC · JPL

== 700201–700300 ==
back to top

Designation			Discovery			Properties		Ref
Permanent	Provisional	Named after	Date	Site	Discoverer(s)	Category	Diam.	Ref
700201	2000 HT_{1}	—	April 25, 2000	Kitt Peak	Spacewatch	·	2.6 km	MPC · JPL
700202	2000 HE_{2}	—	April 25, 2000	Kitt Peak	Spacewatch	·	2.2 km	MPC · JPL
700203	2000 HB_{17}	—	April 24, 2000	Kitt Peak	Spacewatch	V	550 m	MPC · JPL
700204	2000 HZ_{100}	—	April 25, 2000	Kitt Peak	Spacewatch	·	1.4 km	MPC · JPL
700205	2000 HC_{106}	—	September 17, 2012	Mount Lemmon	Mount Lemmon Survey	·	1.0 km	MPC · JPL
700206	2000 JC_{8}	—	April 27, 2000	Kitt Peak	Spacewatch	·	540 m	MPC · JPL
700207	2000 JB_{95}	—	June 14, 2010	Mount Lemmon	Mount Lemmon Survey	·	560 m	MPC · JPL
700208	2000 JJ_{95}	—	September 11, 2007	Mount Lemmon	Mount Lemmon Survey	·	610 m	MPC · JPL
700209	2000 JV_{97}	—	July 12, 2018	Haleakala	Pan-STARRS 1	·	2.5 km	MPC · JPL
700210	2000 JA_{98}	—	April 24, 2006	Kitt Peak	Spacewatch	·	2.6 km	MPC · JPL
700211	2000 KL_{57}	—	May 24, 2000	Kitt Peak	Spacewatch	·	3.1 km	MPC · JPL
700212	2000 KL_{84}	—	May 31, 2000	La Palma	D. Davis, Howell, S.	T_{j} (2.98) · EUP	3.2 km	MPC · JPL
700213	2000 MJ_{7}	—	June 30, 2000	La Silla	Barbieri, C.	·	3.0 km	MPC · JPL
700214	2000 MS_{7}	—	October 5, 2013	Haleakala	Pan-STARRS 1	URS	3.3 km	MPC · JPL
700215	2000 OB_{71}	—	July 31, 2000	Cerro Tololo	Deep Ecliptic Survey	·	850 m	MPC · JPL
700216	2000 ON_{73}	—	August 27, 2014	Haleakala	Pan-STARRS 1	V	440 m	MPC · JPL
700217	2000 OS_{73}	—	July 31, 2000	Cerro Tololo	Deep Ecliptic Survey	·	2.0 km	MPC · JPL
700218	2000 PC_{33}	—	April 20, 2007	Mount Lemmon	Mount Lemmon Survey	·	970 m	MPC · JPL
700219	2000 PJ_{33}	—	August 6, 2014	Haleakala	Pan-STARRS 1	·	610 m	MPC · JPL
700220	2000 PW_{33}	—	May 23, 2014	Haleakala	Pan-STARRS 1	·	1.9 km	MPC · JPL
700221	2000 QF_{111}	—	August 24, 2000	Socorro	LINEAR	BAP	870 m	MPC · JPL
700222	2000 QW_{238}	—	August 25, 2000	Cerro Tololo	Deep Ecliptic Survey	·	1.1 km	MPC · JPL
700223	2000 QT_{242}	—	August 27, 2000	Cerro Tololo	Deep Ecliptic Survey	MAS	670 m	MPC · JPL
700224	2000 QY_{255}	—	November 28, 2013	Haleakala	Pan-STARRS 1	MAR	920 m	MPC · JPL
700225	2000 QO_{256}	—	March 2, 2012	Mount Lemmon	Mount Lemmon Survey	PAD	1.4 km	MPC · JPL
700226	2000 QW_{256}	—	October 11, 2007	Kitt Peak	Spacewatch	·	520 m	MPC · JPL
700227	2000 QA_{257}	—	October 11, 2012	Haleakala	Pan-STARRS 1	·	1.0 km	MPC · JPL
700228	2000 QH_{257}	—	September 27, 2000	Kitt Peak	Spacewatch	KOR	990 m	MPC · JPL
700229	2000 QE_{258}	—	November 28, 2013	Mount Lemmon	Mount Lemmon Survey	·	910 m	MPC · JPL
700230	2000 QH_{258}	—	January 31, 2009	Kitt Peak	Spacewatch	·	530 m	MPC · JPL
700231	2000 QU_{258}	—	February 8, 2011	Mount Lemmon	Mount Lemmon Survey	·	1.1 km	MPC · JPL
700232	2000 QE_{259}	—	August 17, 2017	Haleakala	Pan-STARRS 1	·	1.8 km	MPC · JPL
700233	2000 QV_{259}	—	August 30, 2000	Kitt Peak	Spacewatch	·	1.5 km	MPC · JPL
700234	2000 QL_{260}	—	October 29, 2010	Mount Lemmon	Mount Lemmon Survey	·	1.3 km	MPC · JPL
700235	2000 QX_{260}	—	September 9, 2008	Mount Lemmon	Mount Lemmon Survey	·	910 m	MPC · JPL
700236	2000 RD_{108}	—	September 26, 2000	Apache Point	SDSS	·	1.7 km	MPC · JPL
700237	2000 RM_{108}	—	September 4, 2000	Kitt Peak	Spacewatch	·	1.0 km	MPC · JPL
700238	2000 RR_{110}	—	October 6, 2008	Mount Lemmon	Mount Lemmon Survey	·	980 m	MPC · JPL
700239	2000 RS_{110}	—	January 16, 2009	Mount Lemmon	Mount Lemmon Survey	V	480 m	MPC · JPL
700240	2000 RC_{111}	—	July 2, 2011	Mount Lemmon	Mount Lemmon Survey	·	2.9 km	MPC · JPL
700241	2000 RV_{112}	—	December 30, 2008	Mount Lemmon	Mount Lemmon Survey	·	2.7 km	MPC · JPL
700242	2000 SY_{321}	—	September 28, 2000	Kitt Peak	Spacewatch	·	800 m	MPC · JPL
700243	2000 SC_{377}	—	March 13, 2013	Mount Lemmon	Mount Lemmon Survey	3:2	4.1 km	MPC · JPL
700244	2000 SW_{379}	—	September 21, 2000	Kitt Peak	Deep Ecliptic Survey	·	820 m	MPC · JPL
700245	2000 SX_{379}	—	October 9, 2015	Haleakala	Pan-STARRS 1	·	1.5 km	MPC · JPL
700246	2000 SB_{380}	—	October 3, 2013	Mount Lemmon	Mount Lemmon Survey	·	930 m	MPC · JPL
700247	2000 SQ_{382}	—	September 8, 2011	Kitt Peak	Spacewatch	H	420 m	MPC · JPL
700248	2000 SQ_{383}	—	October 25, 2014	Kitt Peak	Spacewatch	V	500 m	MPC · JPL
700249	2000 SO_{384}	—	May 25, 2003	Kitt Peak	Spacewatch	·	1.1 km	MPC · JPL
700250	2000 SE_{386}	—	January 21, 2015	Haleakala	Pan-STARRS 1	·	2.5 km	MPC · JPL
700251	2000 SQ_{386}	—	September 26, 2000	Kitt Peak	Spacewatch	·	1.4 km	MPC · JPL
700252	2000 TR_{1}	—	October 1, 2000	Socorro	LINEAR	·	880 m	MPC · JPL
700253	2000 TO_{30}	—	October 2, 2000	Kitt Peak	Spacewatch	·	1.8 km	MPC · JPL
700254	2000 TZ_{76}	—	August 14, 2010	Kitt Peak	Spacewatch	·	540 m	MPC · JPL
700255	2000 TB_{77}	—	September 25, 2009	Kitt Peak	Spacewatch	·	1.4 km	MPC · JPL
700256	2000 TM_{77}	—	November 19, 2008	Kitt Peak	Spacewatch	·	970 m	MPC · JPL
700257	2000 TN_{77}	—	November 26, 2013	Mount Lemmon	Mount Lemmon Survey	·	840 m	MPC · JPL
700258	2000 TX_{77}	—	October 18, 2011	Haleakala	Pan-STARRS 1	H	440 m	MPC · JPL
700259	2000 TF_{79}	—	October 2, 2000	Kitt Peak	Spacewatch	MAS	570 m	MPC · JPL
700260	2000 TL_{81}	—	October 23, 2012	Kitt Peak	Spacewatch	·	2.5 km	MPC · JPL
700261	2000 TJ_{82}	—	October 6, 2000	Kitt Peak	Spacewatch	·	480 m	MPC · JPL
700262	2000 UG_{57}	—	October 25, 2000	Socorro	LINEAR	·	640 m	MPC · JPL
700263	2000 UZ_{87}	—	October 31, 2000	Socorro	LINEAR	·	1.2 km	MPC · JPL
700264	2000 UP_{88}	—	October 31, 2000	Socorro	LINEAR	·	940 m	MPC · JPL
700265	2000 WW_{19}	—	November 23, 2000	Kitt Peak	Spacewatch	HNS	1.1 km	MPC · JPL
700266	2000 WF_{198}	—	September 22, 2009	Dauban	C. Rinner, Kugel, F.	·	1.9 km	MPC · JPL
700267	2000 WV_{198}	—	September 10, 2007	Mount Lemmon	Mount Lemmon Survey	·	750 m	MPC · JPL
700268	2000 WF_{199}	—	October 6, 2008	Mount Lemmon	Mount Lemmon Survey	·	920 m	MPC · JPL
700269	2000 WZ_{200}	—	February 16, 2012	Haleakala	Pan-STARRS 1	·	1.8 km	MPC · JPL
700270	2000 WF_{201}	—	December 21, 2012	Mount Lemmon	Mount Lemmon Survey	·	1.3 km	MPC · JPL
700271	2000 WM_{201}	—	November 30, 2000	Apache Point	SDSS Collaboration	·	2.2 km	MPC · JPL
700272	2000 WR_{201}	—	July 16, 2016	Haleakala	Pan-STARRS 1	·	1.8 km	MPC · JPL
700273	2000 WL_{202}	—	February 9, 2008	Catalina	CSS	·	620 m	MPC · JPL
700274	2000 WH_{203}	—	October 30, 2017	Haleakala	Pan-STARRS 1	·	650 m	MPC · JPL
700275	2000 WQ_{204}	—	July 25, 2015	Haleakala	Pan-STARRS 1	·	910 m	MPC · JPL
700276	2000 WJ_{205}	—	December 11, 2014	Mount Lemmon	Mount Lemmon Survey	L5	8.2 km	MPC · JPL
700277	2000 XS_{54}	—	March 22, 2015	Haleakala	Pan-STARRS 1	·	1.1 km	MPC · JPL
700278	2000 XK_{55}	—	January 16, 2013	Mount Lemmon	Mount Lemmon Survey	·	1.1 km	MPC · JPL
700279	2000 YZ_{144}	—	December 21, 2000	Bohyunsan	Bohyunsan	·	1.8 km	MPC · JPL
700280	2000 YA_{145}	—	January 27, 2012	Mount Lemmon	Mount Lemmon Survey	V	560 m	MPC · JPL
700281	2000 YM_{146}	—	January 19, 2012	Haleakala	Pan-STARRS 1	·	600 m	MPC · JPL
700282	2000 YQ_{146}	—	February 8, 2008	Mount Lemmon	Mount Lemmon Survey	·	530 m	MPC · JPL
700283	2001 BW_{83}	—	June 27, 2014	Haleakala	Pan-STARRS 1	·	2.5 km	MPC · JPL
700284	2001 BE_{84}	—	January 25, 2014	Haleakala	Pan-STARRS 1	EUN	1.0 km	MPC · JPL
700285	2001 CZ_{49}	—	February 2, 2001	Kitt Peak	Spacewatch	EOS	1.5 km	MPC · JPL
700286	2001 DN_{85}	—	February 23, 2001	Cerro Tololo	Deep Lens Survey	·	2.0 km	MPC · JPL
700287	2001 DW_{85}	—	February 24, 2001	Cerro Tololo	Deep Lens Survey	AEO	840 m	MPC · JPL
700288	2001 DM_{113}	—	February 20, 2001	Apache Point	SDSS Collaboration	·	2.1 km	MPC · JPL
700289	2001 DR_{113}	—	February 21, 2001	Kitt Peak	Spacewatch	·	1.3 km	MPC · JPL
700290	2001 DC_{114}	—	January 1, 2009	Kitt Peak	Spacewatch	·	1 km	MPC · JPL
700291	2001 DF_{114}	—	January 19, 2012	Haleakala	Pan-STARRS 1	·	1.1 km	MPC · JPL
700292	2001 DS_{114}	—	March 28, 2012	Mount Lemmon	Mount Lemmon Survey	·	1.6 km	MPC · JPL
700293	2001 DA_{117}	—	May 12, 2010	Mount Lemmon	Mount Lemmon Survey	ULA	4.6 km	MPC · JPL
700294	2001 DL_{117}	—	March 24, 2012	Mount Lemmon	Mount Lemmon Survey	·	2.1 km	MPC · JPL
700295	2001 DA_{118}	—	October 1, 2014	Haleakala	Pan-STARRS 1	·	2.1 km	MPC · JPL
700296	2001 DK_{118}	—	February 27, 2008	Mount Lemmon	Mount Lemmon Survey	·	560 m	MPC · JPL
700297	2001 DR_{119}	—	March 8, 2017	Mount Lemmon	Mount Lemmon Survey	·	1.8 km	MPC · JPL
700298	2001 DX_{119}	—	November 17, 2014	Mount Lemmon	Mount Lemmon Survey	·	1.4 km	MPC · JPL
700299	2001 EA_{28}	—	March 15, 2001	Kitt Peak	Spacewatch	NYS	880 m	MPC · JPL
700300	2001 FS_{203}	—	March 21, 2001	Kitt Peak	SKADS	·	520 m	MPC · JPL

== 700301–700400 ==
back to top

Designation			Discovery			Properties		Ref
Permanent	Provisional	Named after	Date	Site	Discoverer(s)	Category	Diam.	Ref
700301	2001 FN_{215}	—	March 21, 2001	Kitt Peak	SKADS	·	1.1 km	MPC · JPL
700302	2001 FV_{219}	—	September 13, 2005	Kitt Peak	Spacewatch	·	640 m	MPC · JPL
700303	2001 FM_{221}	—	October 3, 2003	Kitt Peak	Spacewatch	·	2.2 km	MPC · JPL
700304	2001 FR_{230}	—	March 29, 2001	Kitt Peak	SKADS	·	720 m	MPC · JPL
700305	2001 FL_{235}	—	March 21, 2001	Kitt Peak	SKADS	·	1.2 km	MPC · JPL
700306	2001 FY_{238}	—	March 22, 2001	Kitt Peak	SKADS	·	2.0 km	MPC · JPL
700307	2001 FA_{242}	—	March 30, 2001	Kitt Peak	SKADS	·	2.1 km	MPC · JPL
700308	2001 FQ_{244}	—	March 24, 2001	Kitt Peak	Spacewatch	MAS	690 m	MPC · JPL
700309	2001 FY_{244}	—	January 12, 2011	Mount Lemmon	Mount Lemmon Survey	EOS	1.6 km	MPC · JPL
700310	2001 FB_{245}	—	June 10, 2011	Mount Lemmon	Mount Lemmon Survey	·	520 m	MPC · JPL
700311	2001 FM_{245}	—	February 13, 2012	Haleakala	Pan-STARRS 1	·	1.3 km	MPC · JPL
700312	2001 FL_{246}	—	March 2, 2005	Kitt Peak	Spacewatch	·	1.1 km	MPC · JPL
700313	2001 FE_{247}	—	March 18, 2018	Haleakala	Pan-STARRS 1	·	2.3 km	MPC · JPL
700314	2001 FG_{247}	—	October 8, 2012	Mount Lemmon	Mount Lemmon Survey	AEO	920 m	MPC · JPL
700315	2001 FH_{247}	—	November 1, 2007	Kitt Peak	Spacewatch	·	1.0 km	MPC · JPL
700316	2001 FO_{247}	—	February 26, 2012	Kitt Peak	Spacewatch	·	2.3 km	MPC · JPL
700317	2001 FW_{248}	—	March 29, 2001	Kitt Peak	Spacewatch	THM	1.9 km	MPC · JPL
700318	2001 HE_{69}	—	January 27, 2015	Haleakala	Pan-STARRS 1	·	880 m	MPC · JPL
700319	2001 HH_{69}	—	April 5, 2014	Haleakala	Pan-STARRS 1	·	550 m	MPC · JPL
700320	2001 HG_{70}	—	September 18, 2014	Haleakala	Pan-STARRS 1	·	2.3 km	MPC · JPL
700321	2001 HW_{70}	—	October 23, 2011	Mount Lemmon	Mount Lemmon Survey	·	1.1 km	MPC · JPL
700322	2001 HY_{70}	—	September 9, 2015	Haleakala	Pan-STARRS 1	·	1.0 km	MPC · JPL
700323	2001 HD_{71}	—	September 4, 2008	Kitt Peak	Spacewatch	·	2.1 km	MPC · JPL
700324	2001 HL_{71}	—	April 26, 2001	Kitt Peak	Spacewatch	·	1.6 km	MPC · JPL
700325	2001 KO_{80}	—	January 30, 2006	Kitt Peak	Spacewatch	LIX	3.0 km	MPC · JPL
700326	2001 KA_{81}	—	May 7, 2010	Mount Lemmon	Mount Lemmon Survey	EUN	1.3 km	MPC · JPL
700327	2001 KQ_{81}	—	February 14, 2013	Mount Lemmon	Mount Lemmon Survey	BRA	1.3 km	MPC · JPL
700328	2001 KS_{81}	—	May 1, 2012	Mount Lemmon	Mount Lemmon Survey	·	1.9 km	MPC · JPL
700329	2001 KY_{81}	—	March 16, 2012	Kitt Peak	Spacewatch	·	2.4 km	MPC · JPL
700330	2001 KP_{84}	—	June 17, 2015	Haleakala	Pan-STARRS 1	·	1.2 km	MPC · JPL
700331	2001 KK_{85}	—	June 20, 2015	Haleakala	Pan-STARRS 1	·	1.5 km	MPC · JPL
700332	2001 KQ_{85}	—	April 13, 2018	Haleakala	Pan-STARRS 1	·	2.5 km	MPC · JPL
700333	2001 KN_{86}	—	October 1, 2013	Kitt Peak	Spacewatch	·	900 m	MPC · JPL
700334	2001 KT_{88}	—	September 13, 2007	Mount Lemmon	Mount Lemmon Survey	THM	1.9 km	MPC · JPL
700335	2001 KW_{88}	—	March 24, 2006	Mount Lemmon	Mount Lemmon Survey	·	2.1 km	MPC · JPL
700336	2001 KA_{89}	—	April 5, 2011	Mount Lemmon	Mount Lemmon Survey	·	950 m	MPC · JPL
700337	2001 KS_{89}	—	May 22, 2001	Cerro Tololo	Deep Ecliptic Survey	KOR	1.2 km	MPC · JPL
700338	2001 MQ_{21}	—	June 28, 2001	Palomar	NEAT	·	1.7 km	MPC · JPL
700339	2001 MG_{32}	—	October 23, 2011	Mount Lemmon	Mount Lemmon Survey	·	1.5 km	MPC · JPL
700340	2001 NM_{2}	—	July 13, 2001	Palomar	NEAT	·	1.1 km	MPC · JPL
700341	2001 NG_{23}	—	September 16, 2013	Mount Lemmon	Mount Lemmon Survey	·	3.4 km	MPC · JPL
700342	2001 OE_{31}	—	July 19, 2001	Palomar	NEAT	·	660 m	MPC · JPL
700343	2001 OX_{108}	—	July 19, 2001	Mauna Kea	D. J. Tholen, J. Lambert	·	580 m	MPC · JPL
700344	2001 PB_{15}	—	August 10, 2001	Palomar	NEAT	H	420 m	MPC · JPL
700345	2001 QZ_{95}	—	August 23, 2001	Kitt Peak	Spacewatch	·	1.7 km	MPC · JPL
700346	2001 QN_{175}	—	August 22, 2001	Kitt Peak	Spacewatch	·	900 m	MPC · JPL
700347	2001 QO_{196}	—	August 22, 2001	Haleakala	NEAT	·	1.2 km	MPC · JPL
700348	2001 QP_{210}	—	August 23, 2001	Anderson Mesa	LONEOS	·	570 m	MPC · JPL
700349	2001 QF_{275}	—	July 18, 2001	Palomar	NEAT	·	1.8 km	MPC · JPL
700350	2001 QT_{302}	—	August 19, 2001	Cerro Tololo	Deep Ecliptic Survey	·	2.2 km	MPC · JPL
700351	2001 QT_{304}	—	September 20, 2001	Kitt Peak	Spacewatch	·	2.5 km	MPC · JPL
700352	2001 QO_{307}	—	August 19, 2001	Cerro Tololo	Deep Ecliptic Survey	KOR	900 m	MPC · JPL
700353	2001 QY_{318}	—	August 20, 2001	Cerro Tololo	Deep Ecliptic Survey	·	2.4 km	MPC · JPL
700354	2001 QD_{336}	—	March 28, 2008	Mount Lemmon	Mount Lemmon Survey	·	990 m	MPC · JPL
700355	2001 QJ_{336}	—	September 19, 2001	Kitt Peak	Spacewatch	NYS	850 m	MPC · JPL
700356	2001 QD_{337}	—	August 14, 2013	Haleakala	Pan-STARRS 1	·	2.4 km	MPC · JPL
700357	2001 QL_{337}	—	December 21, 2014	Haleakala	Pan-STARRS 1	·	2.6 km	MPC · JPL
700358	2001 QM_{337}	—	August 26, 2012	Haleakala	Pan-STARRS 1	·	2.1 km	MPC · JPL
700359	2001 QN_{337}	—	February 26, 2016	Mount Lemmon	Mount Lemmon Survey	·	2.4 km	MPC · JPL
700360	2001 RL_{134}	—	August 26, 2001	Palomar	NEAT	·	2.0 km	MPC · JPL
700361	2001 RT_{150}	—	September 11, 2001	Anderson Mesa	LONEOS	·	640 m	MPC · JPL
700362	2001 RM_{156}	—	February 26, 2008	Mount Lemmon	Mount Lemmon Survey	·	1.3 km	MPC · JPL
700363	2001 RN_{156}	—	July 14, 2013	Haleakala	Pan-STARRS 1	(5)	940 m	MPC · JPL
700364	2001 RO_{156}	—	March 30, 2015	Haleakala	Pan-STARRS 1	3:2 · (6124)	3.9 km	MPC · JPL
700365	2001 RW_{156}	—	October 17, 2012	Haleakala	Pan-STARRS 1	·	2.1 km	MPC · JPL
700366	2001 RY_{156}	—	January 30, 2009	Mount Lemmon	Mount Lemmon Survey	·	1.6 km	MPC · JPL
700367	2001 RG_{157}	—	September 12, 2001	Kitt Peak	Deep Ecliptic Survey	AGN	940 m	MPC · JPL
700368	2001 RY_{157}	—	September 15, 2007	Kitt Peak	Spacewatch	·	2.6 km	MPC · JPL
700369	2001 RK_{158}	—	September 12, 2001	Kitt Peak	Spacewatch	·	2.4 km	MPC · JPL
700370	2001 SY_{84}	—	September 20, 2001	Socorro	LINEAR	·	620 m	MPC · JPL
700371	2001 SE_{145}	—	September 16, 2001	Socorro	LINEAR	TIR	3.1 km	MPC · JPL
700372	2001 SM_{157}	—	September 17, 2001	Socorro	LINEAR	·	1.8 km	MPC · JPL
700373	2001 SG_{171}	—	September 16, 2001	Socorro	LINEAR	·	1.9 km	MPC · JPL
700374	2001 SV_{209}	—	September 19, 2001	Socorro	LINEAR	GEF	1.0 km	MPC · JPL
700375	2001 ST_{248}	—	September 19, 2001	Socorro	LINEAR	·	640 m	MPC · JPL
700376	2001 SE_{320}	—	September 21, 2001	Socorro	LINEAR	·	960 m	MPC · JPL
700377	2001 SC_{326}	—	September 17, 2001	Kitt Peak	Spacewatch	·	530 m	MPC · JPL
700378	2001 SJ_{355}	—	September 21, 2001	Apache Point	SDSS Collaboration	·	1.3 km	MPC · JPL
700379	2001 SM_{358}	—	September 16, 2012	Nogales	M. Schwartz, P. R. Holvorcem	PHO	1.1 km	MPC · JPL
700380	2001 SB_{359}	—	March 8, 2008	Mount Lemmon	Mount Lemmon Survey	·	1.7 km	MPC · JPL
700381	2001 SM_{360}	—	January 20, 2012	Haleakala	Pan-STARRS 1	·	2.1 km	MPC · JPL
700382	2001 SR_{360}	—	August 10, 2016	Haleakala	Pan-STARRS 1	·	870 m	MPC · JPL
700383	2001 SN_{361}	—	February 28, 2009	Kitt Peak	Spacewatch	·	1.7 km	MPC · JPL
700384	2001 SW_{361}	—	May 14, 2005	Mount Lemmon	Mount Lemmon Survey	·	1.1 km	MPC · JPL
700385	2001 SO_{362}	—	March 7, 2017	Haleakala	Pan-STARRS 1	·	560 m	MPC · JPL
700386	2001 SW_{362}	—	April 26, 2014	Mount Lemmon	Mount Lemmon Survey	·	1.6 km	MPC · JPL
700387	2001 SB_{365}	—	September 23, 2001	Kitt Peak	Spacewatch	·	1.5 km	MPC · JPL
700388	2001 TL_{84}	—	September 21, 2001	Socorro	LINEAR	·	2.9 km	MPC · JPL
700389	2001 TL_{101}	—	October 10, 2001	Palomar	NEAT	·	2.1 km	MPC · JPL
700390	2001 TS_{157}	—	October 15, 2001	Kitt Peak	Spacewatch	·	1.4 km	MPC · JPL
700391	2001 TQ_{233}	—	September 29, 2001	Palomar	NEAT	·	3.7 km	MPC · JPL
700392	2001 TS_{259}	—	February 29, 2008	Kitt Peak	Spacewatch	·	1.8 km	MPC · JPL
700393	2001 TD_{263}	—	March 10, 2008	Catalina	CSS	H	550 m	MPC · JPL
700394	2001 TY_{263}	—	April 5, 2008	Mount Lemmon	Mount Lemmon Survey	·	1.2 km	MPC · JPL
700395	2001 TL_{264}	—	March 15, 2007	Kitt Peak	Spacewatch	·	1.1 km	MPC · JPL
700396	2001 TZ_{265}	—	October 3, 2013	Haleakala	Pan-STARRS 1	·	2.7 km	MPC · JPL
700397	2001 TG_{266}	—	September 9, 2007	Kitt Peak	Spacewatch	T_{j} (2.99) · EUP	2.8 km	MPC · JPL
700398	2001 TR_{266}	—	November 28, 2013	Kitt Peak	Spacewatch	·	2.1 km	MPC · JPL
700399	2001 TT_{266}	—	March 4, 2016	Haleakala	Pan-STARRS 1	·	2.6 km	MPC · JPL
700400	2001 TT_{267}	—	April 5, 2011	Kitt Peak	Spacewatch	MAS	650 m	MPC · JPL

== 700401–700500 ==
back to top

Designation			Discovery			Properties		Ref
Permanent	Provisional	Named after	Date	Site	Discoverer(s)	Category	Diam.	Ref
700401	2001 TD_{268}	—	October 18, 2007	Kitt Peak	Spacewatch	·	2.4 km	MPC · JPL
700402	2001 TB_{269}	—	March 17, 2015	Mount Lemmon	Mount Lemmon Survey	·	1.9 km	MPC · JPL
700403	2001 UD_{20}	—	October 16, 2001	Palomar	NEAT	·	730 m	MPC · JPL
700404	2001 UA_{101}	—	October 20, 2001	Socorro	LINEAR	·	2.8 km	MPC · JPL
700405	2001 UQ_{103}	—	October 20, 2001	Socorro	LINEAR	·	1.6 km	MPC · JPL
700406	2001 UD_{111}	—	October 21, 2001	Socorro	LINEAR	·	1.4 km	MPC · JPL
700407	2001 UD_{138}	—	October 18, 2001	Palomar	NEAT	·	1.1 km	MPC · JPL
700408	2001 UO_{143}	—	October 18, 2001	Palomar	NEAT	·	2.2 km	MPC · JPL
700409	2001 UT_{198}	—	October 23, 2001	Kitt Peak	Spacewatch	·	1.6 km	MPC · JPL
700410	2001 UZ_{198}	—	October 23, 2001	Kitt Peak	Spacewatch	·	2.6 km	MPC · JPL
700411	2001 UZ_{200}	—	October 21, 2001	Socorro	LINEAR	·	1.5 km	MPC · JPL
700412	2001 UJ_{234}	—	June 23, 2012	Mount Lemmon	Mount Lemmon Survey	·	1.4 km	MPC · JPL
700413	2001 UK_{234}	—	December 20, 2009	Mount Lemmon	Mount Lemmon Survey	·	1.2 km	MPC · JPL
700414	2001 UZ_{234}	—	March 26, 2003	Kitt Peak	Spacewatch	·	970 m	MPC · JPL
700415	2001 UH_{235}	—	March 10, 2007	Mount Lemmon	Mount Lemmon Survey	·	960 m	MPC · JPL
700416	2001 UK_{235}	—	September 30, 2005	Mount Lemmon	Mount Lemmon Survey	·	720 m	MPC · JPL
700417	2001 UM_{235}	—	April 30, 2008	Kitt Peak	Spacewatch	·	1.6 km	MPC · JPL
700418	2001 VF_{73}	—	November 12, 2001	Kitt Peak	Spacewatch	·	1.9 km	MPC · JPL
700419	2001 VH_{134}	—	December 29, 2011	Mount Lemmon	Mount Lemmon Survey	·	670 m	MPC · JPL
700420	2001 VX_{134}	—	March 23, 2003	Kitt Peak	Spacewatch	·	1.1 km	MPC · JPL
700421	2001 VF_{135}	—	February 9, 2008	Mount Lemmon	Mount Lemmon Survey	·	1.7 km	MPC · JPL
700422	2001 VT_{135}	—	November 14, 2001	Kitt Peak	Spacewatch	·	1.8 km	MPC · JPL
700423	2001 VE_{136}	—	April 6, 2017	Haleakala	Pan-STARRS 1	·	1.9 km	MPC · JPL
700424	2001 VP_{137}	—	August 12, 2016	Haleakala	Pan-STARRS 1	NYS	1.0 km	MPC · JPL
700425	2001 VS_{137}	—	April 8, 2008	Kitt Peak	Spacewatch	·	1.5 km	MPC · JPL
700426	2001 VV_{137}	—	April 30, 2016	Haleakala	Pan-STARRS 1	·	530 m	MPC · JPL
700427	2001 WB_{51}	—	November 10, 2001	Palomar	NEAT	H	540 m	MPC · JPL
700428	2001 WV_{54}	—	November 19, 2001	Socorro	LINEAR	·	2.5 km	MPC · JPL
700429	2001 WC_{60}	—	November 19, 2001	Socorro	LINEAR	HNS	1.1 km	MPC · JPL
700430	2001 WY_{79}	—	November 20, 2001	Socorro	LINEAR	·	1.8 km	MPC · JPL
700431	2001 WE_{88}	—	November 19, 2001	Socorro	LINEAR	BAR	1.2 km	MPC · JPL
700432	2001 WH_{97}	—	November 18, 2001	Kitt Peak	Spacewatch	·	2.1 km	MPC · JPL
700433	2001 WV_{103}	—	August 14, 2017	Haleakala	Pan-STARRS 1	·	2.9 km	MPC · JPL
700434	2001 WV_{104}	—	February 10, 2014	Mount Lemmon	Mount Lemmon Survey	·	1.2 km	MPC · JPL
700435	2001 WX_{105}	—	November 1, 2007	Kitt Peak	Spacewatch	·	2.6 km	MPC · JPL
700436	2001 XG_{152}	—	December 14, 2001	Socorro	LINEAR	·	1.3 km	MPC · JPL
700437	2001 XT_{260}	—	November 17, 2001	Kitt Peak	Spacewatch	·	1.9 km	MPC · JPL
700438	2001 XT_{267}	—	December 15, 2001	Apache Point	SDSS Collaboration	·	1.7 km	MPC · JPL
700439	2001 XL_{268}	—	January 16, 2008	Mount Lemmon	Mount Lemmon Survey	·	2.8 km	MPC · JPL
700440	2001 XO_{268}	—	November 3, 2005	Kitt Peak	Spacewatch	·	1.9 km	MPC · JPL
700441	2001 XE_{269}	—	November 28, 2013	Nogales	M. Schwartz, P. R. Holvorcem	·	790 m	MPC · JPL
700442	2001 YW_{3}	—	December 18, 2001	Palomar	NEAT	H	530 m	MPC · JPL
700443	2001 YG_{12}	—	November 11, 2001	Kitt Peak	Spacewatch	H	460 m	MPC · JPL
700444	2001 YR_{162}	—	December 15, 2009	Catalina	CSS	HNS	1.2 km	MPC · JPL
700445	2001 YH_{163}	—	February 10, 2014	Mount Lemmon	Mount Lemmon Survey	·	1.6 km	MPC · JPL
700446	2001 YK_{163}	—	December 20, 2001	Apache Point	SDSS Collaboration	HNS	960 m	MPC · JPL
700447	2001 YX_{163}	—	October 3, 2006	Mount Lemmon	Mount Lemmon Survey	HYG	2.0 km	MPC · JPL
700448	2002 AW_{211}	—	October 3, 2013	Mount Lemmon	Mount Lemmon Survey	·	930 m	MPC · JPL
700449	2002 AF_{214}	—	August 27, 2014	Haleakala	Pan-STARRS 1	·	1.6 km	MPC · JPL
700450	2002 AP_{214}	—	November 14, 2007	Mount Lemmon	Mount Lemmon Survey	·	2.4 km	MPC · JPL
700451	2002 AQ_{214}	—	January 14, 2002	Palomar	NEAT	·	1.8 km	MPC · JPL
700452	2002 CY_{175}	—	January 8, 2002	Socorro	LINEAR	·	1.9 km	MPC · JPL
700453	2002 CY_{187}	—	January 20, 2002	Kitt Peak	Spacewatch	DOR	2.1 km	MPC · JPL
700454	2002 CA_{212}	—	February 10, 2002	Socorro	LINEAR	·	990 m	MPC · JPL
700455	2002 CK_{264}	—	February 9, 2002	Kitt Peak	Spacewatch	·	1.8 km	MPC · JPL
700456	2002 CE_{266}	—	February 7, 2002	Kitt Peak	Spacewatch	H	430 m	MPC · JPL
700457	2002 CC_{288}	—	February 9, 2002	Kitt Peak	Spacewatch	·	1.5 km	MPC · JPL
700458	2002 CF_{306}	—	February 6, 2002	Kitt Peak	Deep Ecliptic Survey	·	1.1 km	MPC · JPL
700459	2002 CB_{315}	—	February 6, 2002	Palomar	NEAT	·	2.3 km	MPC · JPL
700460	2002 CL_{318}	—	February 4, 2002	Palomar	NEAT	615	1.3 km	MPC · JPL
700461	2002 CF_{320}	—	January 17, 2007	Kitt Peak	Spacewatch	·	2.0 km	MPC · JPL
700462	2002 CN_{324}	—	February 13, 2002	Kitt Peak	Spacewatch	V	510 m	MPC · JPL
700463	2002 CV_{326}	—	January 11, 2010	Kitt Peak	Spacewatch	·	1.1 km	MPC · JPL
700464	2002 CA_{329}	—	February 14, 2002	Kitt Peak	Spacewatch	·	1.4 km	MPC · JPL
700465	2002 CG_{329}	—	February 13, 2002	Apache Point	SDSS Collaboration	EOS	1.3 km	MPC · JPL
700466	2002 CK_{329}	—	February 8, 2002	Kitt Peak	Deep Ecliptic Survey	L4	6.1 km	MPC · JPL
700467	2002 DV_{6}	—	February 20, 2002	Kitt Peak	Spacewatch	·	750 m	MPC · JPL
700468	2002 DQ_{17}	—	February 10, 2002	Socorro	LINEAR	·	1.9 km	MPC · JPL
700469	2002 DF_{21}	—	January 8, 2010	Catalina	CSS	H	680 m	MPC · JPL
700470	2002 DP_{21}	—	February 16, 2002	Palomar	NEAT	·	2.5 km	MPC · JPL
700471	2002 EC_{25}	—	March 10, 2002	Kitt Peak	Spacewatch	·	1.2 km	MPC · JPL
700472	2002 ET_{103}	—	February 8, 2002	Kitt Peak	Deep Ecliptic Survey	·	1.3 km	MPC · JPL
700473	2002 EN_{166}	—	January 29, 2011	Mayhill-ISON	L. Elenin	·	2.0 km	MPC · JPL
700474	2002 EX_{166}	—	November 7, 2012	Kitt Peak	Spacewatch	·	1.2 km	MPC · JPL
700475	2002 EK_{168}	—	May 12, 2013	Haleakala	Pan-STARRS 1	·	670 m	MPC · JPL
700476	2002 EL_{170}	—	August 29, 2011	Haleakala	Pan-STARRS 1	H	340 m	MPC · JPL
700477	2002 ET_{170}	—	November 1, 2011	Kitt Peak	Spacewatch	·	590 m	MPC · JPL
700478	2002 EU_{170}	—	March 17, 2018	Haleakala	Pan-STARRS 1	·	1.3 km	MPC · JPL
700479	2002 ES_{171}	—	March 5, 2002	Apache Point	SDSS Collaboration	·	660 m	MPC · JPL
700480	2002 EK_{172}	—	April 16, 2013	Cerro Tololo	DECam	·	1.4 km	MPC · JPL
700481	2002 FC_{23}	—	March 17, 2002	Kitt Peak	Spacewatch	MAS	590 m	MPC · JPL
700482	2002 FK_{43}	—	May 25, 2015	Haleakala	Pan-STARRS 1	EUN	840 m	MPC · JPL
700483	2002 FQ_{43}	—	March 21, 2002	Kitt Peak	Spacewatch	·	1.1 km	MPC · JPL
700484	2002 FS_{44}	—	March 20, 2002	Kitt Peak	Deep Ecliptic Survey	·	950 m	MPC · JPL
700485	2002 GC_{28}	—	April 6, 2002	Cerro Tololo	Deep Ecliptic Survey	·	1.9 km	MPC · JPL
700486	2002 GL_{181}	—	September 19, 2014	Haleakala	Pan-STARRS 1	MAS	590 m	MPC · JPL
700487	2002 GN_{190}	—	December 21, 2008	Catalina	CSS	·	1.9 km	MPC · JPL
700488	2002 GB_{193}	—	February 24, 2012	Kitt Peak	Spacewatch	·	630 m	MPC · JPL
700489	2002 GE_{195}	—	April 13, 2002	Kitt Peak	Spacewatch	L5	5.0 km	MPC · JPL
700490	2002 GW_{195}	—	September 19, 2014	Haleakala	Pan-STARRS 1	·	1.7 km	MPC · JPL
700491	2002 GB_{196}	—	November 27, 2013	Haleakala	Pan-STARRS 1	·	1.1 km	MPC · JPL
700492	2002 GM_{197}	—	September 20, 2009	Mount Lemmon	Mount Lemmon Survey	·	1.2 km	MPC · JPL
700493	2002 GU_{197}	—	October 18, 2012	Haleakala	Pan-STARRS 1	·	990 m	MPC · JPL
700494	2002 GD_{198}	—	September 9, 2020	Haleakala	Pan-STARRS 1	L4	6.2 km	MPC · JPL
700495	2002 JJ_{14}	—	April 21, 2002	Palomar	NEAT	PHO	940 m	MPC · JPL
700496	2002 JH_{150}	—	September 23, 2008	Kitt Peak	Spacewatch	BRA	1.3 km	MPC · JPL
700497	2002 JX_{150}	—	April 20, 2002	Kitt Peak	Spacewatch	·	1.4 km	MPC · JPL
700498	2002 JC_{152}	—	May 3, 2002	Kitt Peak	Spacewatch	EUN	990 m	MPC · JPL
700499	2002 JK_{152}	—	June 19, 2010	Mount Lemmon	Mount Lemmon Survey	MAS	620 m	MPC · JPL
700500	2002 JL_{152}	—	September 15, 2013	Catalina	CSS	·	720 m	MPC · JPL

== 700501–700600 ==
back to top

Designation			Discovery			Properties		Ref
Permanent	Provisional	Named after	Date	Site	Discoverer(s)	Category	Diam.	Ref
700501	2002 JL_{153}	—	April 16, 2013	Haleakala	Pan-STARRS 1	NYS	830 m	MPC · JPL
700502	2002 JQ_{153}	—	January 26, 2017	Mount Lemmon	Mount Lemmon Survey	THM	1.8 km	MPC · JPL
700503	2002 JB_{154}	—	May 8, 2002	Kitt Peak	Spacewatch	·	2.4 km	MPC · JPL
700504	2002 KP_{17}	—	July 29, 2011	Siding Spring	SSS	·	1.4 km	MPC · JPL
700505	2002 KU_{17}	—	May 18, 2002	Palomar	NEAT	·	2.4 km	MPC · JPL
700506	2002 LZ_{2}	—	June 5, 2002	Kitt Peak	Spacewatch	·	740 m	MPC · JPL
700507	2002 LT_{63}	—	June 1, 2002	Palomar	NEAT	EUN	1.1 km	MPC · JPL
700508	2002 LJ_{65}	—	February 10, 2014	Mount Lemmon	Mount Lemmon Survey	·	1.7 km	MPC · JPL
700509	2002 LR_{65}	—	March 4, 2016	Haleakala	Pan-STARRS 1	·	1.0 km	MPC · JPL
700510	2002 MM_{8}	—	June 23, 2002	La Palma	S. Collander-Brown, A. Fitzsimmons	·	2.8 km	MPC · JPL
700511	2002 NW_{2}	—	July 5, 2002	Socorro	LINEAR	·	2.1 km	MPC · JPL
700512	2002 NZ_{2}	—	July 5, 2002	Palomar	NEAT	·	1.2 km	MPC · JPL
700513	2002 NL_{75}	—	July 14, 2009	Kitt Peak	Spacewatch	·	670 m	MPC · JPL
700514	2002 NH_{77}	—	July 15, 2002	Palomar	NEAT	·	1.1 km	MPC · JPL
700515	2002 NK_{77}	—	July 15, 2002	Palomar	NEAT	·	2.6 km	MPC · JPL
700516	2002 NY_{78}	—	July 12, 2002	Palomar	NEAT	EOS	1.9 km	MPC · JPL
700517	2002 NK_{80}	—	July 4, 2002	Palomar	NEAT	·	3.3 km	MPC · JPL
700518	2002 NB_{81}	—	October 23, 2011	Mount Lemmon	Mount Lemmon Survey	·	1.3 km	MPC · JPL
700519	2002 NK_{81}	—	July 14, 2009	Kitt Peak	Spacewatch	·	860 m	MPC · JPL
700520	2002 NS_{81}	—	January 16, 2005	Mauna Kea	Veillet, C.	·	1.2 km	MPC · JPL
700521	2002 NY_{81}	—	June 20, 2013	Haleakala	Pan-STARRS 1	·	3.0 km	MPC · JPL
700522	2002 NH_{83}	—	September 5, 2011	Haleakala	Pan-STARRS 1	·	1.4 km	MPC · JPL
700523	2002 NU_{83}	—	January 19, 2012	Haleakala	Pan-STARRS 1	·	760 m	MPC · JPL
700524	2002 NV_{83}	—	March 1, 2016	Haleakala	Pan-STARRS 1	MAS	660 m	MPC · JPL
700525	2002 OW_{26}	—	July 18, 2002	Socorro	LINEAR	TIR	2.3 km	MPC · JPL
700526	2002 OZ_{30}	—	July 21, 2002	Palomar	NEAT	·	2.9 km	MPC · JPL
700527	2002 OW_{32}	—	November 30, 2008	Catalina	CSS	T_{j} (2.97)	3.7 km	MPC · JPL
700528	2002 OL_{36}	—	August 6, 2002	Palomar	NEAT	·	1.6 km	MPC · JPL
700529	2002 OC_{38}	—	June 10, 2011	Mount Lemmon	Mount Lemmon Survey	EUN	1.1 km	MPC · JPL
700530	2002 PW_{5}	—	August 5, 2002	Palomar	NEAT	·	2.9 km	MPC · JPL
700531	2002 PE_{17}	—	August 6, 2002	Palomar	NEAT	·	1.0 km	MPC · JPL
700532	2002 PF_{19}	—	August 6, 2002	Palomar	NEAT	TIR	2.7 km	MPC · JPL
700533	2002 PH_{78}	—	August 11, 2002	Palomar	NEAT	·	1.3 km	MPC · JPL
700534	2002 PH_{87}	—	August 11, 2002	Palomar	NEAT	PHO	1.1 km	MPC · JPL
700535	2002 PL_{91}	—	August 3, 2002	Palomar	NEAT	·	1.7 km	MPC · JPL
700536	2002 PM_{106}	—	July 21, 2002	Palomar	NEAT	·	3.3 km	MPC · JPL
700537	2002 PE_{112}	—	July 20, 2002	Palomar	NEAT	·	1.5 km	MPC · JPL
700538	2002 PP_{130}	—	July 26, 2002	Palomar	NEAT	·	2.6 km	MPC · JPL
700539	2002 PB_{141}	—	August 14, 2002	Siding Spring	K. S. Russell, R. H. McNaught	·	3.2 km	MPC · JPL
700540	2002 PP_{152}	—	August 8, 2002	Palomar	NEAT	·	1.1 km	MPC · JPL
700541	2002 PB_{154}	—	August 8, 2002	Palomar	NEAT	·	720 m	MPC · JPL
700542	2002 PZ_{154}	—	August 9, 2013	Kitt Peak	Spacewatch	·	2.3 km	MPC · JPL
700543	2002 PV_{160}	—	August 8, 2002	Palomar	NEAT	V	570 m	MPC · JPL
700544	2002 PD_{167}	—	August 8, 2002	Palomar	NEAT	·	2.5 km	MPC · JPL
700545	2002 PN_{172}	—	August 11, 2002	Palomar	NEAT	·	990 m	MPC · JPL
700546	2002 PG_{182}	—	August 8, 2002	Palomar	NEAT	H	360 m	MPC · JPL
700547	2002 PB_{189}	—	August 6, 2002	Palomar	NEAT	·	2.4 km	MPC · JPL
700548	2002 PF_{194}	—	December 19, 2009	Mount Lemmon	Mount Lemmon Survey	ARM	3.2 km	MPC · JPL
700549	2002 PY_{194}	—	October 2, 2010	Kitt Peak	Spacewatch	MAS	610 m	MPC · JPL
700550	2002 PL_{196}	—	October 26, 2008	Mount Lemmon	Mount Lemmon Survey	·	2.4 km	MPC · JPL
700551	2002 PE_{198}	—	August 15, 2002	Palomar	NEAT	H	390 m	MPC · JPL
700552	2002 PO_{198}	—	August 14, 2002	Palomar	NEAT	·	1.3 km	MPC · JPL
700553	2002 PM_{200}	—	August 13, 2002	Palomar	NEAT	·	1.2 km	MPC · JPL
700554	2002 PS_{200}	—	August 11, 2002	Palomar	NEAT	·	1.1 km	MPC · JPL
700555	2002 PB_{201}	—	October 3, 2006	Mount Lemmon	Mount Lemmon Survey	·	850 m	MPC · JPL
700556	2002 PO_{203}	—	August 26, 2011	Piszkéstető	K. Sárneczky	·	1.4 km	MPC · JPL
700557	2002 PA_{204}	—	September 18, 2006	Kitt Peak	Spacewatch	·	910 m	MPC · JPL
700558	2002 PC_{204}	—	February 7, 2011	Mount Lemmon	Mount Lemmon Survey	·	2.5 km	MPC · JPL
700559	2002 PM_{204}	—	September 5, 2015	Haleakala	Pan-STARRS 1	·	1.2 km	MPC · JPL
700560	2002 PN_{204}	—	February 28, 2014	Haleakala	Pan-STARRS 1	·	600 m	MPC · JPL
700561	2002 PZ_{204}	—	September 30, 2006	Mount Lemmon	Mount Lemmon Survey	·	880 m	MPC · JPL
700562	2002 PQ_{205}	—	January 29, 2011	Kitt Peak	Spacewatch	VER	2.0 km	MPC · JPL
700563	2002 QT_{10}	—	August 19, 2002	Palomar	NEAT	·	1.5 km	MPC · JPL
700564	2002 QM_{15}	—	August 17, 2002	Palomar	NEAT	T_{j} (2.99)	2.4 km	MPC · JPL
700565	2002 QJ_{34}	—	August 29, 2002	Palomar	NEAT	·	900 m	MPC · JPL
700566	2002 QZ_{50}	—	August 28, 2002	Palomar	NEAT	LEO	1.5 km	MPC · JPL
700567	2002 QQ_{57}	—	August 18, 2002	Haleakala	NEAT	·	2.7 km	MPC · JPL
700568	2002 QY_{58}	—	August 17, 2002	Palomar	NEAT	·	2.8 km	MPC · JPL
700569	2002 QV_{62}	—	August 18, 2002	Palomar	NEAT	·	940 m	MPC · JPL
700570	2002 QL_{66}	—	August 29, 2002	Palomar	NEAT	·	2.6 km	MPC · JPL
700571	2002 QD_{68}	—	August 18, 2002	Palomar	NEAT	V	510 m	MPC · JPL
700572	2002 QW_{71}	—	August 27, 2002	Palomar	NEAT	·	1.5 km	MPC · JPL
700573	2002 QX_{71}	—	August 17, 2002	Palomar	NEAT	·	3.3 km	MPC · JPL
700574	2002 QV_{73}	—	August 18, 2002	Palomar	NEAT	·	2.4 km	MPC · JPL
700575	2002 QT_{77}	—	March 1, 2005	Kitt Peak	Spacewatch	·	2.9 km	MPC · JPL
700576	2002 QX_{81}	—	April 16, 2004	Apache Point	SDSS	H	430 m	MPC · JPL
700577	2002 QG_{84}	—	August 16, 2002	Palomar	NEAT	·	1.2 km	MPC · JPL
700578	2002 QX_{91}	—	August 30, 2002	Palomar	NEAT	·	580 m	MPC · JPL
700579	2002 QG_{92}	—	August 28, 2002	Palomar	NEAT	·	2.1 km	MPC · JPL
700580	2002 QV_{92}	—	August 29, 2002	Palomar	NEAT	·	1.7 km	MPC · JPL
700581	2002 QR_{93}	—	August 18, 2002	Palomar	NEAT	·	890 m	MPC · JPL
700582	2002 QJ_{94}	—	September 4, 2002	Palomar	NEAT	·	1.6 km	MPC · JPL
700583	2002 QU_{99}	—	August 29, 2002	Palomar	NEAT	·	1.3 km	MPC · JPL
700584	2002 QO_{107}	—	August 17, 2002	Palomar	NEAT	·	1.3 km	MPC · JPL
700585	2002 QN_{108}	—	August 17, 2002	Palomar	NEAT	·	1.6 km	MPC · JPL
700586	2002 QR_{114}	—	August 28, 2002	Palomar	NEAT	·	2.3 km	MPC · JPL
700587	2002 QL_{115}	—	August 8, 2002	Campo Imperatore	CINEOS	·	2.4 km	MPC · JPL
700588	2002 QA_{116}	—	August 18, 2002	Palomar	NEAT	·	730 m	MPC · JPL
700589	2002 QD_{117}	—	August 16, 2002	Palomar	NEAT	·	1.1 km	MPC · JPL
700590	2002 QP_{119}	—	August 17, 2002	Palomar	NEAT	·	790 m	MPC · JPL
700591	2002 QU_{122}	—	December 4, 2007	Catalina	CSS	·	1.5 km	MPC · JPL
700592	2002 QU_{124}	—	August 16, 2002	Palomar	NEAT	EUN	950 m	MPC · JPL
700593	2002 QW_{125}	—	August 12, 2002	Cerro Tololo	Deep Ecliptic Survey	·	1.4 km	MPC · JPL
700594	2002 QU_{129}	—	August 28, 2002	Palomar	NEAT	·	1.3 km	MPC · JPL
700595	2002 QP_{130}	—	August 30, 2002	Palomar	NEAT	·	680 m	MPC · JPL
700596	2002 QY_{133}	—	August 30, 2002	Palomar	NEAT	·	2.8 km	MPC · JPL
700597	2002 QZ_{136}	—	August 28, 2002	Palomar	NEAT	EOS	1.7 km	MPC · JPL
700598	2002 QL_{137}	—	April 25, 2007	Mount Lemmon	Mount Lemmon Survey	·	2.6 km	MPC · JPL
700599	2002 QS_{138}	—	August 17, 2002	Palomar	NEAT	EOS	1.8 km	MPC · JPL
700600	2002 QX_{138}	—	August 17, 2002	Palomar	NEAT	·	750 m	MPC · JPL

== 700601–700700 ==
back to top

Designation			Discovery			Properties		Ref
Permanent	Provisional	Named after	Date	Site	Discoverer(s)	Category	Diam.	Ref
700601	2002 QQ_{141}	—	August 27, 2002	Palomar	NEAT	·	2.8 km	MPC · JPL
700602	2002 QU_{141}	—	August 27, 2002	Palomar	NEAT	TIR	2.4 km	MPC · JPL
700603	2002 QE_{143}	—	January 30, 2000	Kitt Peak	Spacewatch	·	920 m	MPC · JPL
700604	2002 QH_{147}	—	October 31, 2007	Mount Lemmon	Mount Lemmon Survey	·	1.5 km	MPC · JPL
700605	2002 QC_{148}	—	April 14, 2010	Mount Lemmon	Mount Lemmon Survey	·	1.4 km	MPC · JPL
700606	2002 QG_{148}	—	September 6, 2008	Mount Lemmon	Mount Lemmon Survey	·	3.3 km	MPC · JPL
700607	2002 QS_{148}	—	August 29, 2002	Palomar	NEAT	·	2.0 km	MPC · JPL
700608	2002 QA_{149}	—	August 13, 2002	Palomar	NEAT	·	2.8 km	MPC · JPL
700609	2002 QW_{149}	—	October 8, 2008	Mount Lemmon	Mount Lemmon Survey	·	2.7 km	MPC · JPL
700610	2002 QF_{150}	—	September 17, 2006	Kitt Peak	Spacewatch	·	900 m	MPC · JPL
700611	2002 QB_{157}	—	October 12, 2007	Mount Lemmon	Mount Lemmon Survey	·	2.0 km	MPC · JPL
700612	2002 QM_{157}	—	August 30, 2002	Kitt Peak	Spacewatch	·	1.9 km	MPC · JPL
700613	2002 QR_{157}	—	August 9, 2013	Catalina	CSS	·	2.9 km	MPC · JPL
700614	2002 QV_{158}	—	January 26, 2011	Kitt Peak	Spacewatch	·	890 m	MPC · JPL
700615	2002 QF_{159}	—	February 8, 2011	Mount Lemmon	Mount Lemmon Survey	·	630 m	MPC · JPL
700616	2002 QH_{159}	—	August 30, 2002	Kitt Peak	Spacewatch	·	2.1 km	MPC · JPL
700617	2002 QE_{160}	—	September 2, 2008	Kitt Peak	Spacewatch	HYG	2.4 km	MPC · JPL
700618	2002 QP_{160}	—	August 29, 2002	Kitt Peak	Spacewatch	TIR	1.9 km	MPC · JPL
700619	2002 RJ_{7}	—	September 3, 2002	Needville	J. Dellinger	·	2.7 km	MPC · JPL
700620	2002 RV_{10}	—	September 5, 2002	Socorro	LINEAR	·	1.4 km	MPC · JPL
700621	2002 RD_{128}	—	August 12, 2002	Socorro	LINEAR	H	580 m	MPC · JPL
700622	2002 RO_{129}	—	September 5, 2002	Socorro	LINEAR	·	1.4 km	MPC · JPL
700623	2002 RD_{143}	—	September 11, 2002	Palomar	NEAT	·	1.3 km	MPC · JPL
700624	2002 RO_{144}	—	September 11, 2002	Palomar	NEAT	·	560 m	MPC · JPL
700625	2002 RB_{149}	—	September 3, 2002	Palomar	NEAT	TIR	2.2 km	MPC · JPL
700626	2002 RY_{149}	—	September 11, 2002	Haleakala	NEAT	·	820 m	MPC · JPL
700627	2002 RR_{153}	—	September 13, 2002	Palomar	NEAT	·	610 m	MPC · JPL
700628	2002 RW_{157}	—	September 11, 2002	Palomar	NEAT	·	1.7 km	MPC · JPL
700629	2002 RQ_{160}	—	September 12, 2002	Palomar	NEAT	LIX	2.8 km	MPC · JPL
700630	2002 RO_{164}	—	September 12, 2002	Palomar	NEAT	NYS	890 m	MPC · JPL
700631	2002 RV_{165}	—	September 13, 2002	Palomar	NEAT	·	520 m	MPC · JPL
700632	2002 RP_{204}	—	September 14, 2002	Palomar	NEAT	MAS	740 m	MPC · JPL
700633	2002 RX_{208}	—	September 14, 2002	Palomar	NEAT	·	1.3 km	MPC · JPL
700634	2002 RS_{232}	—	September 11, 2002	Palomar	NEAT	·	2.5 km	MPC · JPL
700635	2002 RY_{235}	—	September 14, 2002	Palomar	NEAT	·	2.7 km	MPC · JPL
700636	2002 RK_{236}	—	September 12, 2002	Palomar	R. Matson	·	730 m	MPC · JPL
700637	2002 RO_{239}	—	September 14, 2002	Palomar	NEAT	·	1.8 km	MPC · JPL
700638	2002 RP_{239}	—	September 1, 2002	Palomar	NEAT	·	2.9 km	MPC · JPL
700639	2002 RX_{240}	—	September 14, 2002	Palomar	NEAT	EOS	1.9 km	MPC · JPL
700640	2002 RG_{253}	—	October 5, 2002	Apache Point	SDSS Collaboration	·	1.4 km	MPC · JPL
700641	2002 RP_{253}	—	September 11, 2002	Palomar	NEAT	·	1.7 km	MPC · JPL
700642	2002 RC_{254}	—	September 14, 2002	Palomar	NEAT	·	1.6 km	MPC · JPL
700643	2002 RA_{256}	—	September 4, 2002	Palomar	NEAT	·	880 m	MPC · JPL
700644	2002 RZ_{257}	—	September 14, 2002	Palomar	NEAT	·	1.5 km	MPC · JPL
700645	2002 RT_{259}	—	September 15, 2002	Palomar	NEAT	·	2.1 km	MPC · JPL
700646	2002 RC_{261}	—	September 10, 2002	Palomar	NEAT	EUN	1.3 km	MPC · JPL
700647	2002 RY_{262}	—	September 5, 2002	Anderson Mesa	LONEOS	·	2.4 km	MPC · JPL
700648	2002 RF_{270}	—	August 16, 2002	Kitt Peak	Spacewatch	·	1.3 km	MPC · JPL
700649	2002 RD_{274}	—	September 4, 2002	Palomar	NEAT	·	2.8 km	MPC · JPL
700650	2002 RB_{275}	—	September 4, 2002	Palomar	NEAT	·	2.0 km	MPC · JPL
700651	2002 RZ_{276}	—	October 17, 2006	Mount Lemmon	Mount Lemmon Survey	·	860 m	MPC · JPL
700652	2002 RM_{279}	—	September 14, 2002	Palomar	NEAT	·	1.4 km	MPC · JPL
700653	2002 RR_{282}	—	September 9, 2002	Palomar	NEAT	EOS	1.9 km	MPC · JPL
700654	2002 RQ_{286}	—	April 5, 2008	Kitt Peak	Spacewatch	·	480 m	MPC · JPL
700655	2002 RX_{288}	—	February 3, 2009	Kitt Peak	Spacewatch	·	1.4 km	MPC · JPL
700656	2002 RU_{290}	—	September 9, 2002	Palomar	NEAT	·	2.5 km	MPC · JPL
700657	2002 RP_{291}	—	September 14, 2002	Palomar	NEAT	·	3.2 km	MPC · JPL
700658	2002 RW_{292}	—	November 2, 2007	Kitt Peak	Spacewatch	·	1.5 km	MPC · JPL
700659	2002 RW_{294}	—	October 30, 2013	Haleakala	Pan-STARRS 1	·	1.8 km	MPC · JPL
700660	2002 RX_{294}	—	October 6, 2013	Mount Lemmon	Mount Lemmon Survey	·	830 m	MPC · JPL
700661	2002 RC_{296}	—	September 30, 2002	Haleakala	NEAT	THB	2.3 km	MPC · JPL
700662	2002 RH_{297}	—	February 6, 2016	Haleakala	Pan-STARRS 1	·	2.3 km	MPC · JPL
700663	2002 RM_{298}	—	November 12, 2006	Mount Lemmon	Mount Lemmon Survey	NYS	750 m	MPC · JPL
700664	2002 RS_{298}	—	July 23, 2015	Haleakala	Pan-STARRS 1	·	620 m	MPC · JPL
700665	2002 RW_{298}	—	October 23, 2006	Mount Lemmon	Mount Lemmon Survey	V	500 m	MPC · JPL
700666	2002 RX_{298}	—	November 12, 2013	Mount Lemmon	Mount Lemmon Survey	·	690 m	MPC · JPL
700667	2002 RL_{299}	—	March 4, 2016	Mount Lemmon	Mount Lemmon Survey	·	2.4 km	MPC · JPL
700668	2002 RD_{300}	—	November 27, 2013	Haleakala	Pan-STARRS 1	EOS	1.6 km	MPC · JPL
700669	2002 RN_{300}	—	January 23, 2011	Mount Lemmon	Mount Lemmon Survey	·	920 m	MPC · JPL
700670	2002 RE_{301}	—	September 14, 2002	Palomar	NEAT	V	450 m	MPC · JPL
700671	2002 RR_{301}	—	September 3, 2002	Palomar	NEAT	EUN	1.3 km	MPC · JPL
700672	2002 SU	—	September 23, 2002	Palomar	NEAT	T_{j} (2.69)	1.8 km	MPC · JPL
700673	2002 SZ_{43}	—	September 29, 2002	Kitt Peak	Spacewatch	·	3.0 km	MPC · JPL
700674	2002 SF_{72}	—	September 16, 2002	Palomar	NEAT	·	1.6 km	MPC · JPL
700675	2002 SL_{73}	—	June 27, 2006	Siding Spring	SSS	·	1.3 km	MPC · JPL
700676	2002 TQ_{18}	—	October 2, 2002	Socorro	LINEAR	·	1 km	MPC · JPL
700677	2002 TK_{33}	—	October 2, 2002	Socorro	LINEAR	EUN	1.1 km	MPC · JPL
700678	2002 TO_{37}	—	October 2, 2002	Socorro	LINEAR	·	1.3 km	MPC · JPL
700679	2002 TL_{80}	—	October 1, 2002	Anderson Mesa	LONEOS	·	3.4 km	MPC · JPL
700680	2002 TS_{88}	—	October 3, 2002	Palomar	NEAT	·	1.2 km	MPC · JPL
700681	2002 TC_{90}	—	October 3, 2002	Palomar	NEAT	H	480 m	MPC · JPL
700682	2002 TA_{99}	—	October 3, 2002	Socorro	LINEAR	·	550 m	MPC · JPL
700683	2002 TN_{104}	—	October 4, 2002	Socorro	LINEAR	·	1.4 km	MPC · JPL
700684	2002 TV_{152}	—	August 12, 2002	Cerro Tololo	Deep Ecliptic Survey	·	820 m	MPC · JPL
700685	2002 TR_{157}	—	October 5, 2002	Palomar	NEAT	·	960 m	MPC · JPL
700686	2002 TH_{163}	—	October 5, 2002	Palomar	NEAT	TIR	2.6 km	MPC · JPL
700687	2002 TG_{182}	—	August 16, 2002	Socorro	LINEAR	·	2.5 km	MPC · JPL
700688	2002 TY_{234}	—	October 6, 2002	Socorro	LINEAR	·	2.3 km	MPC · JPL
700689	2002 TJ_{262}	—	October 10, 2002	Palomar	NEAT	·	3.0 km	MPC · JPL
700690	2002 TJ_{263}	—	October 3, 2002	Socorro	LINEAR	THM	2.4 km	MPC · JPL
700691	2002 TX_{270}	—	September 15, 2002	Haleakala	NEAT	526	2.2 km	MPC · JPL
700692	2002 TZ_{373}	—	October 15, 2002	Palomar	NEAT	·	940 m	MPC · JPL
700693	2002 TK_{380}	—	October 6, 2002	Palomar	NEAT	·	920 m	MPC · JPL
700694	2002 TU_{381}	—	October 9, 2002	Palomar	NEAT	·	3.0 km	MPC · JPL
700695	2002 TD_{385}	—	October 5, 2002	Apache Point	SDSS Collaboration	NEM	1.8 km	MPC · JPL
700696	2002 TO_{386}	—	November 6, 2002	Kitt Peak	Spacewatch	·	1.6 km	MPC · JPL
700697	2002 TJ_{389}	—	October 30, 2007	Kitt Peak	Spacewatch	·	1.6 km	MPC · JPL
700698	2002 TQ_{389}	—	October 6, 2013	Mount Lemmon	Mount Lemmon Survey	·	1.1 km	MPC · JPL
700699	2002 TR_{389}	—	May 3, 2005	Kitt Peak	Spacewatch	·	1.0 km	MPC · JPL
700700	2002 TS_{389}	—	February 8, 2011	Mount Lemmon	Mount Lemmon Survey	·	860 m	MPC · JPL

== 700701–700800 ==
back to top

Designation			Discovery			Properties		Ref
Permanent	Provisional	Named after	Date	Site	Discoverer(s)	Category	Diam.	Ref
700701	2002 TY_{389}	—	October 11, 2002	Palomar	NEAT	·	870 m	MPC · JPL
700702	2002 TC_{390}	—	July 19, 2006	Palomar	NEAT	·	2.2 km	MPC · JPL
700703	2002 TM_{391}	—	September 4, 2011	Haleakala	Pan-STARRS 1	·	1.4 km	MPC · JPL
700704	2002 TH_{392}	—	August 25, 2012	Mount Lemmon	Mount Lemmon Survey	·	450 m	MPC · JPL
700705	2002 TT_{392}	—	March 18, 2010	Mount Lemmon	Mount Lemmon Survey	·	1.8 km	MPC · JPL
700706	2002 TU_{392}	—	March 21, 2017	Haleakala	Pan-STARRS 1	·	560 m	MPC · JPL
700707	2002 TJ_{394}	—	October 18, 2012	Haleakala	Pan-STARRS 1	KOR	930 m	MPC · JPL
700708	2002 UC_{2}	—	August 24, 2002	Palomar	NEAT	·	1.5 km	MPC · JPL
700709	2002 UE_{14}	—	October 29, 2002	Palomar	NEAT	JUN	960 m	MPC · JPL
700710	2002 UH_{70}	—	October 16, 2002	Palomar	NEAT	·	2.4 km	MPC · JPL
700711	2002 UL_{70}	—	October 25, 2002	Palomar	NEAT	·	1.5 km	MPC · JPL
700712	2002 UM_{73}	—	September 9, 2007	Kitt Peak	Spacewatch	·	1.8 km	MPC · JPL
700713	2002 UU_{73}	—	October 29, 2002	Palomar	NEAT	3:2 · SHU	5.2 km	MPC · JPL
700714	2002 UV_{74}	—	October 30, 2002	Palomar	NEAT	·	1.6 km	MPC · JPL
700715	2002 UM_{75}	—	October 31, 2002	Palomar	NEAT	V	520 m	MPC · JPL
700716	2002 UU_{75}	—	October 31, 2002	Palomar	NEAT	·	3.3 km	MPC · JPL
700717	2002 UD_{76}	—	October 31, 2002	Apache Point	SDSS	·	1.4 km	MPC · JPL
700718	2002 UA_{79}	—	November 27, 2006	Mount Lemmon	Mount Lemmon Survey	MAS	570 m	MPC · JPL
700719	2002 UR_{79}	—	December 1, 2006	Mount Lemmon	Mount Lemmon Survey	·	1.1 km	MPC · JPL
700720	2002 UY_{80}	—	March 16, 2004	Kitt Peak	Spacewatch	·	930 m	MPC · JPL
700721	2002 UE_{81}	—	March 29, 2011	Mount Lemmon	Mount Lemmon Survey	URS	3.1 km	MPC · JPL
700722	2002 UJ_{81}	—	November 24, 2008	Kitt Peak	Spacewatch	·	2.7 km	MPC · JPL
700723	2002 UR_{81}	—	September 23, 2015	Haleakala	Pan-STARRS 1	EUN	1.1 km	MPC · JPL
700724	2002 VS_{1}	—	November 2, 2002	La Palma	A. Fitzsimmons	MAS	650 m	MPC · JPL
700725	2002 VG_{3}	—	November 1, 2002	Palomar	NEAT	·	590 m	MPC · JPL
700726	2002 VB_{13}	—	November 4, 2002	Palomar	NEAT	·	1.1 km	MPC · JPL
700727	2002 VW_{53}	—	November 6, 2002	Socorro	LINEAR	·	2.2 km	MPC · JPL
700728	2002 VX_{56}	—	November 6, 2002	Eskridge	G. Hug	·	3.3 km	MPC · JPL
700729	2002 VG_{71}	—	November 7, 2002	Socorro	LINEAR	NYS	1.1 km	MPC · JPL
700730	2002 VZ_{72}	—	November 5, 2002	Anderson Mesa	LONEOS	PHO	1.2 km	MPC · JPL
700731	2002 VC_{98}	—	November 11, 2002	Anderson Mesa	LONEOS	·	1.7 km	MPC · JPL
700732	2002 VV_{105}	—	November 12, 2002	Socorro	LINEAR	JUN	1.1 km	MPC · JPL
700733	2002 VB_{112}	—	November 13, 2002	Kitt Peak	Spacewatch	·	1.0 km	MPC · JPL
700734	2002 VC_{137}	—	November 5, 2002	Anderson Mesa	LONEOS	THM	2.6 km	MPC · JPL
700735	2002 VX_{137}	—	November 1, 2002	Palomar	NEAT	·	1.5 km	MPC · JPL
700736	2002 VV_{142}	—	November 5, 2002	Palomar	NEAT	HYG	2.4 km	MPC · JPL
700737	2002 VU_{144}	—	November 4, 2002	Palomar	NEAT	·	1.7 km	MPC · JPL
700738	2002 VP_{145}	—	November 4, 2002	Palomar	NEAT	NEM	1.7 km	MPC · JPL
700739	2002 VB_{149}	—	October 6, 2013	Mount Lemmon	Mount Lemmon Survey	·	2.8 km	MPC · JPL
700740	2002 VC_{149}	—	December 4, 2013	Kitt Peak	Spacewatch	·	2.9 km	MPC · JPL
700741	2002 VO_{149}	—	December 5, 2002	Kitt Peak	Deep Ecliptic Survey	·	3.0 km	MPC · JPL
700742	2002 VT_{149}	—	December 3, 2002	Palomar	NEAT	H	470 m	MPC · JPL
700743	2002 VR_{151}	—	February 2, 2009	Mount Lemmon	Mount Lemmon Survey	·	2.2 km	MPC · JPL
700744	2002 VN_{153}	—	April 2, 2014	Mount Lemmon	Mount Lemmon Survey	·	1.6 km	MPC · JPL
700745	2002 VX_{154}	—	July 24, 2015	Charleston	R. Holmes	·	1.4 km	MPC · JPL
700746	2002 WM_{8}	—	November 24, 2002	Palomar	NEAT	·	3.0 km	MPC · JPL
700747	2002 WX_{19}	—	November 24, 2002	Palomar	NEAT	·	600 m	MPC · JPL
700748	2002 WX_{23}	—	November 16, 2002	Palomar	NEAT	NYS	1.0 km	MPC · JPL
700749	2002 WM_{32}	—	November 27, 2006	Mount Lemmon	Mount Lemmon Survey	MAS	720 m	MPC · JPL
700750	2002 WS_{32}	—	February 7, 2011	Mount Lemmon	Mount Lemmon Survey	·	1.1 km	MPC · JPL
700751	2002 WX_{32}	—	November 19, 2008	Mount Lemmon	Mount Lemmon Survey	·	3.1 km	MPC · JPL
700752	2002 WB_{33}	—	March 12, 2016	Haleakala	Pan-STARRS 1	·	2.7 km	MPC · JPL
700753	2002 XF_{3}	—	December 1, 2002	Socorro	LINEAR	·	1.0 km	MPC · JPL
700754	2002 XS_{118}	—	December 3, 2002	Palomar	NEAT	NYS	900 m	MPC · JPL
700755	2002 XD_{122}	—	February 15, 2013	Haleakala	Pan-STARRS 1	·	1.4 km	MPC · JPL
700756	2002 XZ_{123}	—	October 10, 2007	Kitt Peak	Spacewatch	·	2.4 km	MPC · JPL
700757	2002 XA_{124}	—	October 1, 2011	Charleston	R. Holmes	·	1.5 km	MPC · JPL
700758	2002 XD_{124}	—	March 22, 2015	Mount Lemmon	Mount Lemmon Survey	·	970 m	MPC · JPL
700759	2002 XR_{124}	—	September 5, 2008	Kitt Peak	Spacewatch	3:2	4.2 km	MPC · JPL
700760	2002 XV_{124}	—	December 5, 2002	Kitt Peak	Spacewatch	MAS	600 m	MPC · JPL
700761	2002 YU_{7}	—	December 30, 2002	Bohyunsan	Jeon, Y.-B., Lee, H.	·	2.5 km	MPC · JPL
700762	2002 YZ_{36}	—	November 15, 2010	Kitt Peak	Spacewatch	·	1.1 km	MPC · JPL
700763	2003 AO_{85}	—	January 10, 2003	Socorro	LINEAR	·	1.4 km	MPC · JPL
700764	2003 BY_{39}	—	January 27, 2003	Kitt Peak	Spacewatch	MAS	550 m	MPC · JPL
700765	2003 BT_{45}	—	January 29, 2003	Haleakala	NEAT	THB	2.8 km	MPC · JPL
700766	2003 BD_{96}	—	August 26, 2012	Kitt Peak	Spacewatch	VER	2.6 km	MPC · JPL
700767	2003 BA_{97}	—	April 11, 2013	Mount Lemmon	Mount Lemmon Survey	·	1.7 km	MPC · JPL
700768	2003 BS_{97}	—	February 14, 2013	Haleakala	Pan-STARRS 1	BRA	1.4 km	MPC · JPL
700769	2003 BT_{97}	—	May 25, 2011	Kitt Peak	Spacewatch	MAS	560 m	MPC · JPL
700770	2003 BB_{98}	—	August 24, 2008	Kitt Peak	Spacewatch	·	900 m	MPC · JPL
700771	2003 BL_{98}	—	December 26, 2014	Haleakala	Pan-STARRS 1	·	2.8 km	MPC · JPL
700772	2003 BY_{98}	—	August 21, 2015	Haleakala	Pan-STARRS 1	·	1.9 km	MPC · JPL
700773	2003 BM_{99}	—	September 26, 2012	Mount Lemmon	Mount Lemmon Survey	·	3.1 km	MPC · JPL
700774	2003 BV_{99}	—	February 5, 2009	Kitt Peak	Spacewatch	·	3.1 km	MPC · JPL
700775	2003 BD_{100}	—	April 10, 2016	Haleakala	Pan-STARRS 1	·	3.5 km	MPC · JPL
700776	2003 BN_{100}	—	December 6, 2013	Haleakala	Pan-STARRS 1	·	2.9 km	MPC · JPL
700777	2003 BF_{101}	—	October 23, 2015	Mount Lemmon	Mount Lemmon Survey	·	1.5 km	MPC · JPL
700778	2003 BC_{102}	—	August 31, 2017	Mount Lemmon	Mount Lemmon Survey	·	4.2 km	MPC · JPL
700779	2003 CG_{22}	—	February 7, 2003	La Silla	Barbieri, C.	KOR	1.3 km	MPC · JPL
700780	2003 CX_{22}	—	February 7, 2003	La Silla	Barbieri, C.	·	510 m	MPC · JPL
700781	2003 EJ_{51}	—	March 11, 2003	Palomar	NEAT	·	2.9 km	MPC · JPL
700782	2003 EP_{63}	—	March 11, 2003	Kitt Peak	Spacewatch	·	2.1 km	MPC · JPL
700783	2003 EX_{63}	—	March 8, 2003	Anderson Mesa	LONEOS	PHO	880 m	MPC · JPL
700784	2003 EF_{64}	—	March 7, 2013	Mount Lemmon	Mount Lemmon Survey	·	2.1 km	MPC · JPL
700785	2003 EL_{64}	—	March 11, 2003	Palomar	NEAT	PHO	820 m	MPC · JPL
700786	2003 EK_{65}	—	September 14, 2014	Kitt Peak	Spacewatch	·	2.2 km	MPC · JPL
700787	2003 FP_{122}	—	March 31, 2003	Cerro Tololo	Deep Lens Survey	AGN	840 m	MPC · JPL
700788	2003 FP_{135}	—	April 16, 2007	Catalina	CSS	·	1.3 km	MPC · JPL
700789	2003 FW_{137}	—	March 17, 2017	Haleakala	Pan-STARRS 1	H	440 m	MPC · JPL
700790	2003 FE_{141}	—	March 31, 2003	Kitt Peak	Spacewatch	·	520 m	MPC · JPL
700791	2003 FN_{141}	—	March 23, 2003	Kitt Peak	Spacewatch	·	970 m	MPC · JPL
700792	2003 FZ_{141}	—	March 23, 2003	Kitt Peak	Spacewatch	·	1.3 km	MPC · JPL
700793	2003 GB_{48}	—	April 9, 2003	Palomar	NEAT	MRX	870 m	MPC · JPL
700794	2003 GC_{60}	—	April 27, 2012	Haleakala	Pan-STARRS 1	·	1.2 km	MPC · JPL
700795	2003 GA_{64}	—	November 20, 2016	Mount Lemmon	Mount Lemmon Survey	·	1.5 km	MPC · JPL
700796	2003 GY_{64}	—	August 12, 2013	Haleakala	Pan-STARRS 1	·	680 m	MPC · JPL
700797	2003 GC_{65}	—	May 24, 2014	Haleakala	Pan-STARRS 1	·	1.7 km	MPC · JPL
700798	2003 GJ_{66}	—	April 1, 2003	Kitt Peak	Deep Ecliptic Survey	·	570 m	MPC · JPL
700799	2003 GL_{67}	—	April 1, 2003	Apache Point	SDSS Collaboration	·	1.7 km	MPC · JPL
700800	2003 HG_{18}	—	March 17, 2015	Mount Lemmon	Mount Lemmon Survey	·	740 m	MPC · JPL

== 700801–700900 ==
back to top

Designation			Discovery			Properties		Ref
Permanent	Provisional	Named after	Date	Site	Discoverer(s)	Category	Diam.	Ref
700801	2003 HM_{60}	—	September 23, 2015	Haleakala	Pan-STARRS 1	·	3.0 km	MPC · JPL
700802	2003 HK_{63}	—	June 30, 2015	Haleakala	Pan-STARRS 1	·	1.1 km	MPC · JPL
700803	2003 HK_{64}	—	September 10, 2008	Kitt Peak	Spacewatch	·	1.0 km	MPC · JPL
700804	2003 HP_{64}	—	March 20, 2007	Mount Lemmon	Mount Lemmon Survey	·	1.4 km	MPC · JPL
700805	2003 HE_{65}	—	July 14, 2016	Mount Lemmon	Mount Lemmon Survey	·	990 m	MPC · JPL
700806	2003 JH_{16}	—	May 6, 2003	Kitt Peak	Spacewatch	·	620 m	MPC · JPL
700807	2003 JB_{19}	—	September 16, 2013	Catalina	CSS	·	2.0 km	MPC · JPL
700808	2003 JX_{19}	—	November 25, 2006	Mount Lemmon	Mount Lemmon Survey	·	1.5 km	MPC · JPL
700809	2003 KP_{14}	—	May 25, 2003	Kitt Peak	Spacewatch	·	660 m	MPC · JPL
700810	2003 KM_{25}	—	May 31, 2003	Cerro Tololo	Deep Ecliptic Survey	KOR	1.1 km	MPC · JPL
700811	2003 KB_{38}	—	February 5, 2011	Mount Lemmon	Mount Lemmon Survey	·	1.5 km	MPC · JPL
700812	2003 KN_{38}	—	May 22, 2003	Kitt Peak	Spacewatch	PHO	800 m	MPC · JPL
700813	2003 KY_{39}	—	October 1, 2014	Kitt Peak	Spacewatch	·	1.6 km	MPC · JPL
700814	2003 LG_{10}	—	December 7, 2014	Haleakala	Pan-STARRS 1	H	400 m	MPC · JPL
700815	2003 NB_{14}	—	September 5, 2008	Kitt Peak	Spacewatch	DOR	2.1 km	MPC · JPL
700816	2003 NX_{14}	—	July 9, 2003	Kitt Peak	Spacewatch	·	1.9 km	MPC · JPL
700817	2003 OG_{17}	—	July 29, 2003	Campo Imperatore	CINEOS	·	1.1 km	MPC · JPL
700818 Pauldelaney	2003 OE_{34}	Pauldelaney	July 31, 2003	Mauna Kea	D. D. Balam	·	1.4 km	MPC · JPL
700819	2003 OA_{35}	—	July 24, 2003	Palomar	NEAT	·	1.4 km	MPC · JPL
700820	2003 OD_{35}	—	September 10, 2016	Mount Lemmon	Mount Lemmon Survey	EUN	1 km	MPC · JPL
700821	2003 OL_{35}	—	October 28, 2016	Haleakala	Pan-STARRS 1	MAR	1 km	MPC · JPL
700822	2003 OU_{35}	—	July 25, 2003	Palomar	NEAT	·	1.4 km	MPC · JPL
700823	2003 PU_{4}	—	October 17, 2012	Haleakala	Pan-STARRS 1	·	1.3 km	MPC · JPL
700824	2003 PN_{13}	—	August 4, 2003	Kitt Peak	Spacewatch	·	1.8 km	MPC · JPL
700825	2003 PP_{13}	—	October 1, 2009	Mount Lemmon	Mount Lemmon Survey	·	2.0 km	MPC · JPL
700826	2003 QX	—	August 4, 2003	Socorro	LINEAR	·	1.0 km	MPC · JPL
700827	2003 QL_{16}	—	August 20, 2003	Campo Imperatore	CINEOS	·	2.1 km	MPC · JPL
700828	2003 QM_{50}	—	August 22, 2003	Palomar	NEAT	·	1.2 km	MPC · JPL
700829	2003 QO_{96}	—	August 28, 2003	Palomar	NEAT	EUN	1.1 km	MPC · JPL
700830	2003 QQ_{97}	—	August 30, 2003	Kitt Peak	Spacewatch	·	1.6 km	MPC · JPL
700831	2003 QL_{120}	—	August 22, 2003	Palomar	NEAT	·	910 m	MPC · JPL
700832	2003 QU_{120}	—	August 22, 2003	Palomar	NEAT	·	1.2 km	MPC · JPL
700833	2003 QL_{121}	—	October 7, 2010	Kitt Peak	Spacewatch	·	630 m	MPC · JPL
700834	2003 QP_{123}	—	August 30, 2014	Kitt Peak	Spacewatch	·	1.9 km	MPC · JPL
700835	2003 RK_{7}	—	September 5, 2003	Campo Imperatore	CINEOS	·	1.1 km	MPC · JPL
700836	2003 RF_{25}	—	September 15, 2003	Palomar	NEAT	·	1.1 km	MPC · JPL
700837	2003 RN_{28}	—	April 3, 2016	Haleakala	Pan-STARRS 1	MRX	910 m	MPC · JPL
700838	2003 SZ_{8}	—	September 17, 2003	Kitt Peak	Spacewatch	·	2.2 km	MPC · JPL
700839	2003 SO_{9}	—	September 17, 2003	Kitt Peak	Spacewatch	fast	1.2 km	MPC · JPL
700840	2003 SZ_{24}	—	September 17, 2003	Kitt Peak	Spacewatch	·	1.1 km	MPC · JPL
700841	2003 SK_{42}	—	September 18, 2003	Kitt Peak	Spacewatch	H	360 m	MPC · JPL
700842	2003 SO_{71}	—	September 17, 2003	Palomar	NEAT	EUN	1.2 km	MPC · JPL
700843	2003 SZ_{74}	—	September 18, 2003	Kitt Peak	Spacewatch	·	1.8 km	MPC · JPL
700844	2003 SN_{89}	—	September 18, 2003	Palomar	NEAT	·	2.6 km	MPC · JPL
700845	2003 SE_{92}	—	September 18, 2003	Kitt Peak	Spacewatch	·	1.2 km	MPC · JPL
700846	2003 SX_{96}	—	September 19, 2003	Kitt Peak	Spacewatch	·	1.1 km	MPC · JPL
700847	2003 SZ_{97}	—	September 19, 2003	Palomar	NEAT	·	1.6 km	MPC · JPL
700848	2003 SG_{109}	—	September 20, 2003	Kitt Peak	Spacewatch	·	2.4 km	MPC · JPL
700849	2003 ST_{114}	—	September 16, 2003	Kitt Peak	Spacewatch	·	2.7 km	MPC · JPL
700850	2003 SA_{129}	—	September 20, 2003	Piszkéstető	K. Sárneczky, B. Sipőcz	·	3.1 km	MPC · JPL
700851	2003 SX_{132}	—	September 19, 2003	Kitt Peak	Spacewatch	·	1.4 km	MPC · JPL
700852	2003 SH_{166}	—	September 4, 2003	Kitt Peak	Spacewatch	EUN	1.0 km	MPC · JPL
700853	2003 SA_{194}	—	September 20, 2003	Palomar	NEAT	·	1.4 km	MPC · JPL
700854	2003 SO_{216}	—	September 20, 2003	Anderson Mesa	LONEOS	·	1.2 km	MPC · JPL
700855	2003 SD_{234}	—	September 25, 2003	Palomar	NEAT	·	1.9 km	MPC · JPL
700856	2003 SL_{239}	—	September 27, 2003	Kitt Peak	Spacewatch	·	1.1 km	MPC · JPL
700857	2003 SO_{241}	—	September 27, 2003	Kitt Peak	Spacewatch	·	1.9 km	MPC · JPL
700858	2003 SJ_{242}	—	September 22, 2003	Kitt Peak	Spacewatch	·	2.2 km	MPC · JPL
700859	2003 SH_{243}	—	September 28, 2003	Kitt Peak	Spacewatch	KOR	910 m	MPC · JPL
700860	2003 ST_{243}	—	September 28, 2003	Kitt Peak	Spacewatch	·	1.6 km	MPC · JPL
700861	2003 SH_{255}	—	September 27, 2003	Kitt Peak	Spacewatch	EOS	1.5 km	MPC · JPL
700862	2003 SP_{260}	—	September 27, 2003	Kitt Peak	Spacewatch	·	1.1 km	MPC · JPL
700863	2003 SO_{267}	—	September 29, 2003	Kitt Peak	Spacewatch	EOS	1.7 km	MPC · JPL
700864	2003 SH_{274}	—	September 30, 2003	Kitt Peak	Spacewatch	·	1.6 km	MPC · JPL
700865	2003 SJ_{287}	—	September 29, 2003	Kitt Peak	Spacewatch	·	1.9 km	MPC · JPL
700866	2003 SS_{300}	—	September 18, 2003	Kitt Peak	Spacewatch	·	2.4 km	MPC · JPL
700867	2003 SJ_{324}	—	September 17, 2003	Kitt Peak	Spacewatch	·	1.1 km	MPC · JPL
700868	2003 SX_{324}	—	September 17, 2003	Palomar	NEAT	·	590 m	MPC · JPL
700869	2003 SK_{326}	—	September 18, 2003	Kitt Peak	Spacewatch	·	2.0 km	MPC · JPL
700870	2003 SN_{335}	—	October 16, 2003	Palomar	NEAT	·	1.6 km	MPC · JPL
700871	2003 SG_{337}	—	September 30, 2003	Kitt Peak	Spacewatch	·	1.6 km	MPC · JPL
700872	2003 SV_{344}	—	September 18, 2003	Kitt Peak	Spacewatch	·	770 m	MPC · JPL
700873	2003 SC_{346}	—	September 18, 2003	Kitt Peak	Spacewatch	EOS	1.1 km	MPC · JPL
700874	2003 SV_{346}	—	September 18, 2003	Kitt Peak	Spacewatch	·	530 m	MPC · JPL
700875	2003 SU_{358}	—	August 25, 2003	Cerro Tololo	Deep Ecliptic Survey	·	1.8 km	MPC · JPL
700876	2003 SY_{361}	—	September 22, 2003	Kitt Peak	Spacewatch	KON	2.0 km	MPC · JPL
700877	2003 SB_{364}	—	September 26, 2003	Apache Point	SDSS Collaboration	·	1.8 km	MPC · JPL
700878	2003 SD_{366}	—	September 17, 2003	Kitt Peak	Spacewatch	EUN	830 m	MPC · JPL
700879	2003 SV_{366}	—	September 26, 2003	Apache Point	SDSS Collaboration	EUN	1.0 km	MPC · JPL
700880	2003 SL_{372}	—	September 29, 2003	Kitt Peak	Spacewatch	EOS	1.6 km	MPC · JPL
700881	2003 SL_{375}	—	September 26, 2003	Apache Point	SDSS Collaboration	·	1.7 km	MPC · JPL
700882	2003 SY_{377}	—	September 28, 2003	Kitt Peak	Spacewatch	·	1.8 km	MPC · JPL
700883	2003 SM_{379}	—	September 26, 2003	Apache Point	SDSS	·	2.3 km	MPC · JPL
700884	2003 SL_{380}	—	September 26, 2003	Apache Point	SDSS Collaboration	·	1.4 km	MPC · JPL
700885	2003 ST_{381}	—	September 26, 2003	Apache Point	SDSS Collaboration	·	880 m	MPC · JPL
700886	2003 SW_{382}	—	September 30, 2003	Kitt Peak	Spacewatch	·	940 m	MPC · JPL
700887	2003 SW_{391}	—	September 26, 2003	Apache Point	SDSS Collaboration	·	1.2 km	MPC · JPL
700888	2003 SZ_{392}	—	September 26, 2003	Apache Point	SDSS Collaboration	·	1.3 km	MPC · JPL
700889	2003 SK_{395}	—	September 26, 2003	Apache Point	SDSS Collaboration	·	1.2 km	MPC · JPL
700890	2003 SJ_{398}	—	September 26, 2003	Apache Point	SDSS Collaboration	·	2.2 km	MPC · JPL
700891	2003 SO_{400}	—	September 26, 2003	Apache Point	SDSS Collaboration	·	2.8 km	MPC · JPL
700892	2003 SN_{402}	—	September 26, 2003	Apache Point	SDSS Collaboration	·	1.6 km	MPC · JPL
700893	2003 SN_{407}	—	September 27, 2003	Apache Point	SDSS Collaboration	·	2.2 km	MPC · JPL
700894	2003 SV_{407}	—	September 27, 2003	Apache Point	SDSS Collaboration	EUN	1.1 km	MPC · JPL
700895	2003 SE_{409}	—	September 28, 2003	Kitt Peak	Spacewatch	·	1.3 km	MPC · JPL
700896	2003 SC_{414}	—	September 29, 2003	Kitt Peak	Spacewatch	·	1.2 km	MPC · JPL
700897	2003 SD_{414}	—	September 29, 2003	Kitt Peak	Spacewatch	·	1.3 km	MPC · JPL
700898	2003 SG_{416}	—	October 2, 2003	Kitt Peak	Spacewatch	·	2.8 km	MPC · JPL
700899	2003 SP_{418}	—	September 28, 2003	Apache Point	SDSS	·	1.2 km	MPC · JPL
700900	2003 SV_{425}	—	September 28, 2003	Apache Point	SDSS	·	580 m	MPC · JPL

== 700901–701000 ==
back to top

Designation			Discovery			Properties		Ref
Permanent	Provisional	Named after	Date	Site	Discoverer(s)	Category	Diam.	Ref
700901	2003 SN_{431}	—	September 21, 2003	Kitt Peak	Spacewatch	·	840 m	MPC · JPL
700902	2003 SR_{432}	—	September 19, 2003	Kitt Peak	Spacewatch	·	2.3 km	MPC · JPL
700903	2003 ST_{435}	—	September 24, 2003	Palomar	NEAT	·	810 m	MPC · JPL
700904	2003 SW_{437}	—	July 9, 2013	Haleakala	Pan-STARRS 1	·	580 m	MPC · JPL
700905	2003 SJ_{439}	—	October 12, 2010	Kitt Peak	Spacewatch	·	660 m	MPC · JPL
700906	2003 SL_{439}	—	September 22, 2003	Kitt Peak	Spacewatch	·	1.3 km	MPC · JPL
700907	2003 SU_{439}	—	April 22, 2013	Mount Lemmon	Mount Lemmon Survey	·	1.0 km	MPC · JPL
700908	2003 SO_{441}	—	October 24, 2008	Kitt Peak	Spacewatch	PAD	1.3 km	MPC · JPL
700909	2003 SW_{441}	—	September 14, 2014	Mount Lemmon	Mount Lemmon Survey	EOS	1.6 km	MPC · JPL
700910	2003 SY_{441}	—	April 13, 2012	Mount Lemmon	Mount Lemmon Survey	·	2.2 km	MPC · JPL
700911	2003 SA_{442}	—	September 30, 2003	Kitt Peak	Spacewatch	·	1.4 km	MPC · JPL
700912	2003 SD_{442}	—	September 29, 2003	Kitt Peak	Spacewatch	·	530 m	MPC · JPL
700913	2003 SJ_{443}	—	September 22, 2003	Kitt Peak	Spacewatch	·	2.7 km	MPC · JPL
700914	2003 SB_{444}	—	September 6, 2008	Mount Lemmon	Mount Lemmon Survey	·	1.7 km	MPC · JPL
700915	2003 SG_{444}	—	March 30, 2012	Kitt Peak	Spacewatch	·	2.2 km	MPC · JPL
700916	2003 SJ_{444}	—	June 19, 2007	Kitt Peak	Spacewatch	·	1.3 km	MPC · JPL
700917	2003 SL_{445}	—	June 29, 2014	Haleakala	Pan-STARRS 1	·	3.1 km	MPC · JPL
700918	2003 SC_{446}	—	August 28, 2014	Haleakala	Pan-STARRS 1	NYS	940 m	MPC · JPL
700919	2003 SG_{446}	—	January 7, 2006	Kitt Peak	Spacewatch	EOS	1.6 km	MPC · JPL
700920	2003 SS_{446}	—	October 1, 2013	Mount Lemmon	Mount Lemmon Survey	·	570 m	MPC · JPL
700921	2003 SM_{448}	—	September 2, 2014	Haleakala	Pan-STARRS 1	·	2.4 km	MPC · JPL
700922	2003 SZ_{449}	—	September 16, 2003	Kitt Peak	Spacewatch	·	1.7 km	MPC · JPL
700923	2003 SB_{450}	—	February 8, 2011	Mount Lemmon	Mount Lemmon Survey	·	2.1 km	MPC · JPL
700924	2003 SD_{450}	—	September 19, 2003	Kitt Peak	Spacewatch	·	1.3 km	MPC · JPL
700925	2003 SZ_{450}	—	February 25, 2006	Mount Lemmon	Mount Lemmon Survey	3:2 · SHU	3.9 km	MPC · JPL
700926	2003 SB_{451}	—	September 27, 2003	Kitt Peak	Spacewatch	·	2.0 km	MPC · JPL
700927	2003 SU_{451}	—	September 30, 2003	Kitt Peak	Spacewatch	·	690 m	MPC · JPL
700928	2003 SL_{452}	—	September 28, 2003	Kitt Peak	Spacewatch	THM	1.8 km	MPC · JPL
700929	2003 SU_{452}	—	February 7, 2011	Mount Lemmon	Mount Lemmon Survey	·	1.6 km	MPC · JPL
700930	2003 SB_{453}	—	May 13, 2018	Mount Lemmon	Mount Lemmon Survey	·	1.9 km	MPC · JPL
700931	2003 SP_{453}	—	March 2, 2006	Kitt Peak	Spacewatch	·	2.1 km	MPC · JPL
700932	2003 SR_{453}	—	October 22, 2014	Kitt Peak	Spacewatch	·	2.0 km	MPC · JPL
700933	2003 SY_{453}	—	October 8, 2012	Charleston	R. Holmes	WIT	710 m	MPC · JPL
700934	2003 SO_{454}	—	September 28, 2003	Kitt Peak	Spacewatch	·	1.4 km	MPC · JPL
700935	2003 SA_{455}	—	September 29, 2003	Kitt Peak	Spacewatch	·	2.0 km	MPC · JPL
700936	2003 SD_{455}	—	August 9, 2007	Kitt Peak	Spacewatch	·	1.2 km	MPC · JPL
700937	2003 SE_{456}	—	June 13, 2018	Haleakala	Pan-STARRS 2	·	2.3 km	MPC · JPL
700938	2003 SG_{457}	—	September 17, 2003	Kitt Peak	Spacewatch	EMA	2.4 km	MPC · JPL
700939	2003 SP_{457}	—	March 11, 1996	Kitt Peak	Spacewatch	TIR	2.6 km	MPC · JPL
700940	2003 SX_{457}	—	November 17, 2009	Mount Lemmon	Mount Lemmon Survey	·	2.1 km	MPC · JPL
700941	2003 SD_{458}	—	February 14, 2012	Haleakala	Pan-STARRS 1	LIX	2.8 km	MPC · JPL
700942	2003 SW_{458}	—	May 27, 2014	Mount Lemmon	Mount Lemmon Survey	·	1.3 km	MPC · JPL
700943	2003 SG_{459}	—	September 19, 2003	Kitt Peak	Spacewatch	·	2.2 km	MPC · JPL
700944	2003 SX_{459}	—	January 4, 2016	Haleakala	Pan-STARRS 1	EOS	1.3 km	MPC · JPL
700945	2003 SA_{460}	—	February 15, 2012	Haleakala	Pan-STARRS 1	·	630 m	MPC · JPL
700946	2003 SF_{461}	—	November 9, 2009	Mount Lemmon	Mount Lemmon Survey	·	2.2 km	MPC · JPL
700947	2003 SX_{463}	—	October 14, 2007	Kitt Peak	Spacewatch	·	760 m	MPC · JPL
700948	2003 SS_{464}	—	September 17, 2003	Kitt Peak	Spacewatch	·	950 m	MPC · JPL
700949	2003 SL_{466}	—	September 19, 2003	Kitt Peak	Spacewatch	EOS	1.6 km	MPC · JPL
700950	2003 SC_{467}	—	September 27, 2003	Kitt Peak	Spacewatch	·	1.3 km	MPC · JPL
700951	2003 SM_{474}	—	September 30, 2003	Kitt Peak	Spacewatch	·	600 m	MPC · JPL
700952	2003 SJ_{475}	—	September 22, 2003	Kitt Peak	Spacewatch	EUN	850 m	MPC · JPL
700953	2003 SS_{476}	—	September 18, 2003	Kitt Peak	Spacewatch	AGN	1.0 km	MPC · JPL
700954	2003 TT_{3}	—	October 1, 2003	Kitt Peak	Spacewatch	EOS	2.0 km	MPC · JPL
700955	2003 TF_{8}	—	October 1, 2003	Kitt Peak	Spacewatch	·	1.2 km	MPC · JPL
700956	2003 TB_{27}	—	September 20, 2003	Kitt Peak	Spacewatch	·	2.2 km	MPC · JPL
700957	2003 TV_{27}	—	October 1, 2003	Kitt Peak	Spacewatch	·	930 m	MPC · JPL
700958	2003 TN_{48}	—	September 21, 2003	Črni Vrh	Mikuž, H., Matičič, S.	·	2.4 km	MPC · JPL
700959	2003 TW_{48}	—	October 3, 2003	Kitt Peak	Spacewatch	·	1.4 km	MPC · JPL
700960	2003 TE_{51}	—	October 5, 2003	Kitt Peak	Spacewatch	·	1.3 km	MPC · JPL
700961	2003 TD_{52}	—	October 5, 2003	Kitt Peak	Spacewatch	EOS	1.8 km	MPC · JPL
700962	2003 TZ_{53}	—	October 5, 2003	Kitt Peak	Spacewatch	·	1.3 km	MPC · JPL
700963	2003 TN_{56}	—	October 5, 2003	Kitt Peak	Spacewatch	·	2.5 km	MPC · JPL
700964	2003 TY_{60}	—	December 13, 2010	Mount Lemmon	Mount Lemmon Survey	EOS	1.7 km	MPC · JPL
700965	2003 TQ_{62}	—	January 14, 2011	Mount Lemmon	Mount Lemmon Survey	·	2.6 km	MPC · JPL
700966	2003 TX_{62}	—	October 3, 2003	Kitt Peak	Spacewatch	·	1.5 km	MPC · JPL
700967	2003 TY_{63}	—	August 10, 2016	Haleakala	Pan-STARRS 1	·	1.1 km	MPC · JPL
700968	2003 TV_{64}	—	October 1, 2003	Kitt Peak	Spacewatch	·	1.1 km	MPC · JPL
700969	2003 TF_{66}	—	October 1, 2003	Kitt Peak	Spacewatch	KOR	920 m	MPC · JPL
700970	2003 UQ_{10}	—	October 19, 2003	Palomar	NEAT	·	1.4 km	MPC · JPL
700971	2003 UT_{20}	—	October 20, 1995	Kitt Peak	Spacewatch	H	440 m	MPC · JPL
700972	2003 UC_{51}	—	September 29, 2003	Anderson Mesa	LONEOS	·	3.2 km	MPC · JPL
700973	2003 UQ_{51}	—	October 18, 2003	Palomar	NEAT	·	1.2 km	MPC · JPL
700974	2003 UT_{58}	—	September 27, 2003	Socorro	LINEAR	·	1.4 km	MPC · JPL
700975	2003 UN_{68}	—	September 18, 2003	Kitt Peak	Spacewatch	·	2.2 km	MPC · JPL
700976	2003 UC_{88}	—	September 28, 2003	Kitt Peak	Spacewatch	·	1.4 km	MPC · JPL
700977	2003 UM_{105}	—	September 29, 2003	Kitt Peak	Spacewatch	·	1.5 km	MPC · JPL
700978	2003 UZ_{115}	—	October 21, 2003	Palomar	NEAT	·	1.4 km	MPC · JPL
700979	2003 UA_{131}	—	October 19, 2003	Palomar	NEAT	·	1.4 km	MPC · JPL
700980	2003 UJ_{139}	—	October 16, 2003	Palomar	NEAT	·	1.7 km	MPC · JPL
700981	2003 US_{167}	—	October 22, 2003	Kitt Peak	Spacewatch	·	2.6 km	MPC · JPL
700982	2003 UF_{191}	—	October 23, 2003	Kitt Peak	Spacewatch	·	2.6 km	MPC · JPL
700983	2003 UD_{198}	—	October 21, 2003	Kitt Peak	Spacewatch	·	1.3 km	MPC · JPL
700984	2003 UM_{234}	—	October 19, 2003	Kitt Peak	Spacewatch	EOS	1.3 km	MPC · JPL
700985	2003 UT_{238}	—	October 17, 2003	Anderson Mesa	LONEOS	·	840 m	MPC · JPL
700986	2003 UW_{239}	—	September 28, 2003	Socorro	LINEAR	·	1.5 km	MPC · JPL
700987	2003 UM_{251}	—	October 25, 2003	Kitt Peak	Spacewatch	·	1.2 km	MPC · JPL
700988	2003 UO_{258}	—	September 28, 2003	Kitt Peak	Spacewatch	·	940 m	MPC · JPL
700989	2003 UN_{279}	—	October 3, 2003	Kitt Peak	Spacewatch	·	2.6 km	MPC · JPL
700990	2003 UU_{289}	—	October 19, 2003	Kitt Peak	Spacewatch	·	810 m	MPC · JPL
700991	2003 UE_{299}	—	September 22, 2003	Kitt Peak	Spacewatch	EOS	1.7 km	MPC · JPL
700992	2003 UB_{301}	—	October 17, 2003	Kitt Peak	Spacewatch	V	510 m	MPC · JPL
700993	2003 UU_{301}	—	October 17, 2003	Kitt Peak	Spacewatch	·	590 m	MPC · JPL
700994	2003 UE_{302}	—	September 21, 2003	Kitt Peak	Spacewatch	·	1.1 km	MPC · JPL
700995	2003 UW_{304}	—	October 18, 2003	Kitt Peak	Spacewatch	·	1.9 km	MPC · JPL
700996	2003 UT_{323}	—	September 27, 2003	Kitt Peak	Spacewatch	V	510 m	MPC · JPL
700997	2003 UK_{330}	—	October 17, 2003	Kitt Peak	Spacewatch	·	1.9 km	MPC · JPL
700998	2003 UA_{331}	—	October 18, 2003	Apache Point	SDSS Collaboration	·	2.3 km	MPC · JPL
700999	2003 UQ_{336}	—	September 16, 2003	Kitt Peak	Spacewatch	·	1.6 km	MPC · JPL
701000	2003 UW_{337}	—	October 18, 2003	Apache Point	SDSS Collaboration	·	1.9 km	MPC · JPL

back to top

== Meaning of names ==
As minor planet discoveries are confirmed, they are given a permanent number by the IAU's Minor Planet Center (MPC), and the discoverers can then submit names for them, following the IAU's naming conventions. The list below concerns those minor planets in the specified number-range that have received names, and explains the meanings of those names.

Official naming citations of newly named small Solar System bodies are approved and published in a bulletin by IAU's Working Group for Small Bodies Nomenclature (WGSBN). Before May 2021, citations were published in MPC's Minor Planet Circulars for many decades. Recent citations can also be found on the JPL Small-Body Database (SBDB). Until his death in 2016, German astronomer Lutz D. Schmadel compiled these citations into the Dictionary of Minor Planet Names (DMP) and regularly updated the collection.

Based on Paul Herget's The Names of the Minor Planets, Schmadel also researched the unclear origin of numerous asteroids, most of which had been named prior to World War II. This article incorporates text from this source, which is in the public domain: SBDB New namings may only be added to this list below after official publication as the preannouncement of names is condemned. The WGSBN publishes a comprehensive guideline for the naming rules of non-cometary small Solar System bodies.

Named minor planet	Provisional	This minor planet was named for...	Ref · Catalog
700094 Anunciação	1999 PG_{4}	Alcione Anunciação Caetano, Brazilian astronomy educator and science communicator.	IAU · 700094
700818 Pauldelaney	2003 OE_{34}	Paul J. Delaney (born 1956), Australian-Canadian variable-star astronomer.	IAU · 700818
