= Hou Renzhi =

Chinese geographer

Hou Renzhi 侯仁之
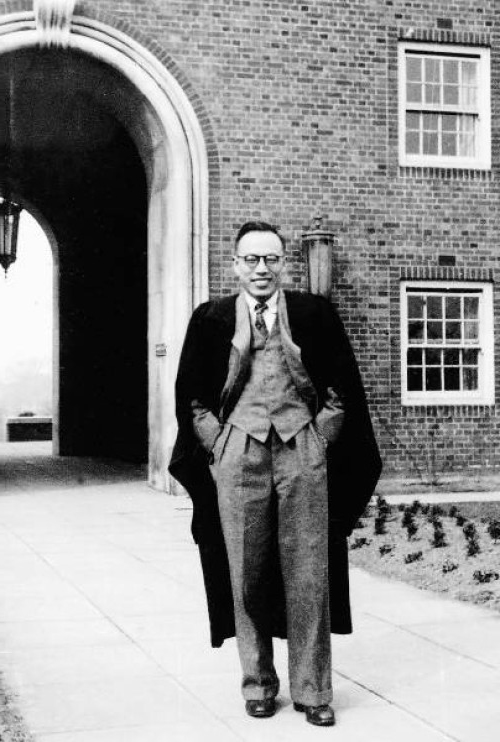
- Hou Renzhi in 1946
- Born: December 6, 1911
- Died: October 22, 2013 (aged 101)
- Scientific career
- Fields: Historical geography
- Institutions: Yenching University; Peking University

Hou Renzhi (Chinese: 侯仁之; December 6, 1911 – October 22, 2013) was a Chinese geographer. A pioneer of modern historical geography in China, he contributed to the development of both its practice and theory.

== Biography ==
Hou was born in Zaoqiang County, Zhili Province, on December 6, 1911. He grew in Encheng, Pingyuan County, Shandong Province.

At the age of 21, he was inspired by Gu Jiegang to start learning history at the Yenching University, Beijing. He studied history with Gu Jiegang and from William Hung. He graduated with both a B.A (in 1936) and later an M.A. in history and continued to teach at the university, where he met and later married Zhang Weiying.

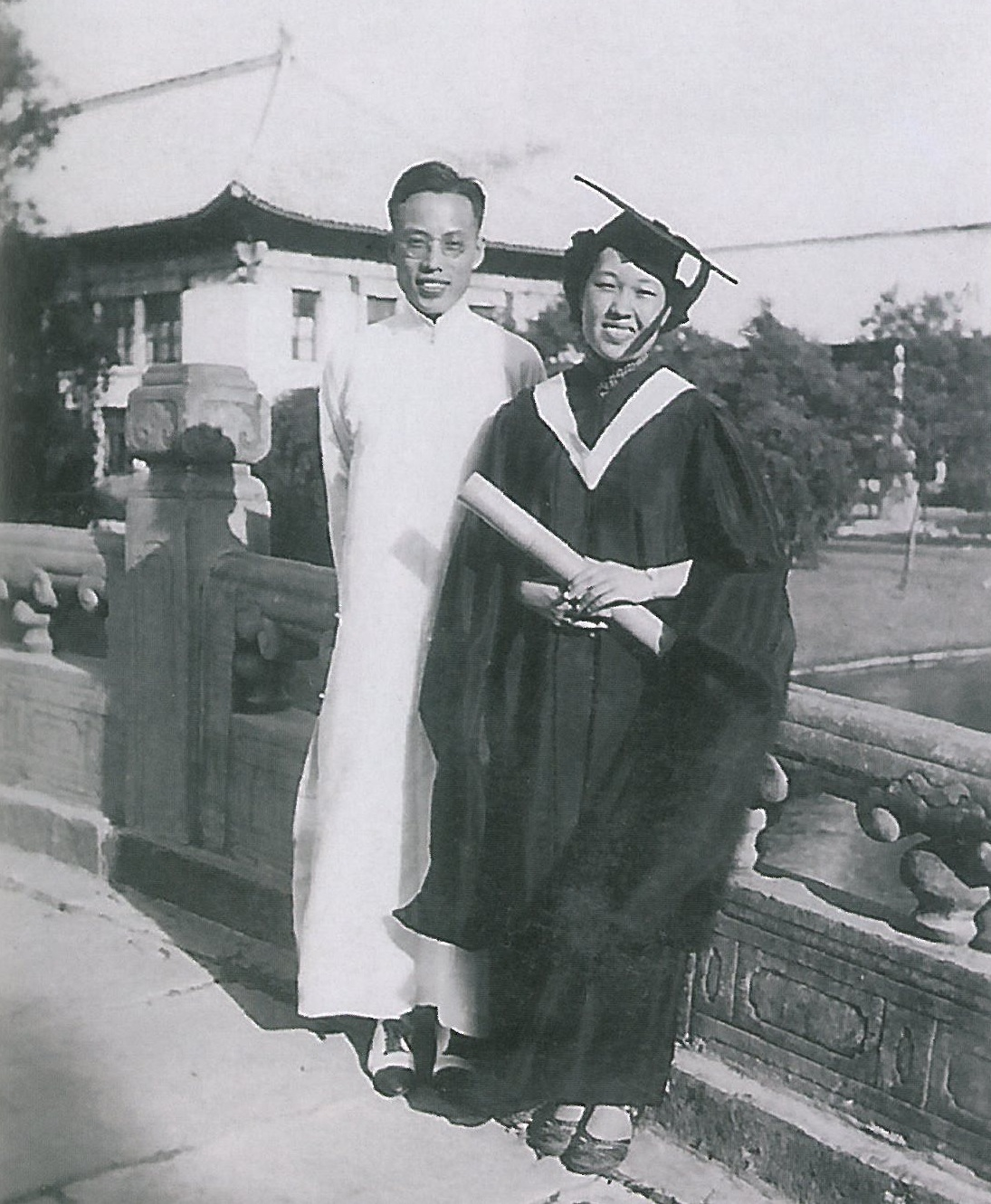
Hou Renzhi with his wife Zhang Weiying, 1938

Hou planned to study in England, but in 1941 he was imprisoned after the Japanese captured Yenching University, and, as one of the leaders of the student body, he was sentenced for 1 year, and was limited in his movements upon his release. He and his wife settled in Tianjin until the end of Second Sino-Japanese War.

In 1946, after the war, Hou started studying his Ph.D. at Liverpool University, and he graduated in 1949, writing his thesis on the historical geography of Beijing. Hou returned to China and worked as associate professor at the history department in Yenching University. and later held several positions at Peking University, including the deputy provost of the university, dean of the department of geology and geography, and dean of the department of geography.

In 1950, Hou was appointed part of the "Beijing Urban Planning Committee" to advise on Beijing's urban planning. In addition, he advanced historical geography research in Chengde, Handan, Zibo and other historically significant cities. Hou also studied the deserts in Ningxia, Inner Mongolia and Gansu, to provide advice and information concerning the planting of sheltering forests.

During the Culture Revolution (1966–1976) Hou was criticized for his work and he was transferred to the countryside, to a May Seventh Cadre School in Jiangxi for physical labor and reform.

In 1972, Hou returned to academic studies and research, and published his first collection of academic papers in 1979. In 1980, Hou was elected a member of the Chinese Academy of Sciences.

In 1984, Hou became a visiting researcher at Cornell University. During his time, he learned about the Convention Concerning the Protection of the World Cultural and Natural Heritage. Hou, appealed to the Lianghui to have China part of the convention, and he wrote a proposal to convince the Chinese People's Political Consultative Conference. On December 12, 1985, China ratified the convention. In 1987, the Forbidden City, the Great Wall of China, and the Zhoukoudian became the first Chinese sites to be listed on the World Heritage List by UNESCO. Hou is sometimes considered as "the first person to apply for the Chinese heritage".

Hou died at the age of 102, in October 2013.

In addition to his historical geography research, and the new approaches he developed, Hou wrote many books and works for the general public.

== Selected works ==
- The Principles and Practice of Historical Geography.
- Four Treatises on Historical Geography
- A Brief History of Ancient Chinese Geography
- Beijing Urban Historical Geography
- Hou, Renzhi (2014). An Historical Geography of Peiping. China Academic Library. Springer-Verlag Berlin Heidelberg. doi:10.1007/978-3-642-55321-9. ISBN 978-3-662-51537-2.
- Hou, Renzhi (2015). Symposium on Chinese Historical Geography. China Academic Library. Springer-Verlag Berlin Heidelberg. doi:10.1007/978-3-662-45272-1. ISBN 978-3-662-52614-9.

== Honors and awards ==
- In 1984, Hou received Honorary Doctorate in Science, from Beijing University.
- Hou received the George Davidson Medal in 1999, as well as the HLHL Science and Technology Achievement Award in the same year.
- Hou was elected as an honorary member of the Chinese Society for Popular Science.
- In 2006, Hou received the Cai Yuanpei Award.
- Asteroid 309295 Hourenzhi, discovered by astronomers of the PMO NEO Survey Program in 2007, was named in his memory. The official naming citation was published by the Minor Planet Center on 8 November 2019 (M.P.C. 118221).
