= Meanings of minor-planet names: 309001–310000 =

As minor planet discoveries are confirmed, they are given a permanent number by the IAU's Minor Planet Center (MPC), and the discoverers can then submit names for them, following the IAU's naming conventions. The list below concerns those minor planets in the specified number-range that have received names, and explains the meanings of those names.

Official naming citations of newly named small Solar System bodies are approved and published in a bulletin by IAU's Working Group for Small Bodies Nomenclature (WGSBN). Before May 2021, citations were published in MPC's Minor Planet Circulars for many decades. Recent citations can also be found on the JPL Small-Body Database (SBDB). Until his death in 2016, German astronomer Lutz D. Schmadel compiled these citations into the Dictionary of Minor Planet Names (DMP) and regularly updated the collection.

Based on Paul Herget's The Names of the Minor Planets, Schmadel also researched the unclear origin of numerous asteroids, most of which had been named prior to World War II. This article incorporates text from this source, which is in the public domain: SBDB New namings may only be added to this list below after official publication as the preannouncement of names is condemned. The WGSBN publishes a comprehensive guideline for the naming rules of non-cometary small Solar System bodies.

== 309001–309100 ==
Named minor planet	Provisional	This minor planet was named for...	Ref · Catalog
There are no named minor planets in this number range

== 309101–309200 ==
back to top

Named minor planet	Provisional	This minor planet was named for...	Ref · Catalog
There are no named minor planets in this number range

== 309201–309300 ==
back to top

Named minor planet	Provisional	This minor planet was named for...	Ref · Catalog
309206 Mažvydas	2007 GE_{32}	Martynas Mažvydas (1510–1563), a Lithuanian writer and publisher who edited the first printed book in the Lithuanian language.	IAU · 309206
309227 Tsukiko	2007 QC	Selene "Tsukiko" Mazzucato (born 1994), daughter of Italian co-discoverer Michele Mazzucato	JPL · 309227
309295 Hourenzhi	2007 RX_{228}	Hou Renzhi (1911–2013), an academician of Chinese Academy of Sciences, is a pioneer of modern historical geography in China. He made outstanding contributions to the development of historical geography both in theory and in practice.	JPL · 309295

== 309301–309400 ==
back to top

Named minor planet	Provisional	This minor planet was named for...	Ref · Catalog
There are no named minor planets in this number range

== 309401–309500 ==
back to top

Named minor planet	Provisional	This minor planet was named for...	Ref · Catalog
309426 Guidoschwarz	2007 TX_{412}	Guido Schwarz, Swiss science communicator and space enthusiast.	IAU · 309426

== 309501–309600 ==
back to top

Named minor planet	Provisional	This minor planet was named for...	Ref · Catalog
There are no named minor planets in this number range

== 309601–309700 ==
back to top

Named minor planet	Provisional	This minor planet was named for...	Ref · Catalog
There are no named minor planets in this number range

== 309701–309800 ==
back to top

Named minor planet	Provisional	This minor planet was named for...	Ref · Catalog
309704 Baruffetti	2008 FD_{131}	Pietro Baruffetti (born 1954), musician, amateur astronomer, and chairman of the Gruppo Astrofili Massesi (Massesi Amateur Astronomer Group).	JPL · 309704
309706 Ávila	2008 GP	Ávila, the capital of the province of Ávila in Spain	JPL · 309706

== 309801–309900 ==
back to top

Named minor planet	Provisional	This minor planet was named for...	Ref · Catalog
There are no named minor planets in this number range

== 309901–310000 ==
back to top

Named minor planet	Provisional	This minor planet was named for...	Ref · Catalog
309917 Sefyani	2009 FS_{14}	Fouad Sefyani (born 1967) is a researcher in Cadi Ayyad University's department of physics in Marrakech. In particular he conducts spectral studies of RR Lyrae stars at Oukaïmeden observatory.	JPL · 309917

back to top

Preceded by 308,001–309,000	Meanings of minor-planet names List of minor planets: 309,001–310,000	Succeeded by 310,001–311,000
