= List of minor planets: 309001–310000 =

The following is a partial list of minor planets, running from minor-planet number 309001 through 310000, inclusive. The primary data for this and other partial lists is based on JPL's "Small-Body Orbital Elements" and data available from the Minor Planet Center. Critical list information is also provided by the MPC, unless otherwise specified from Lowell Observatory. A detailed description of the table's columns and additional sources are given on the main page including a complete list of every page in this series, and a statistical break-up on the dynamical classification of minor planets.

Also see the summary list of all named bodies in numerical and alphabetical order, and the corresponding naming citations for the number range of this particular list. New namings may only be added to this list after official publication, as the preannouncement of names is condemned by the Working Group for Small Bodies Nomenclature of the International Astronomical Union.

Near-Earth obj.	MBA (inner)	MBA (outer)	Centaur
Mars-crosser	MBA (middle)	Jupiter trojan	Trans-Neptunian obj.
Unclassified

== 309001–309100 ==
Designation			Discovery			Properties		Ref
Permanent	Provisional	Named after	Date	Site	Discoverer(s)	Category	Diam.	Ref
309001	2006 UG_{49}	—	October 17, 2006	Kitt Peak	Spacewatch	·	1.9 km	MPC · JPL
309002	2006 UG_{50}	—	October 17, 2006	Kitt Peak	Spacewatch	·	1.7 km	MPC · JPL
309003	2006 UL_{51}	—	October 17, 2006	Mount Lemmon	Mount Lemmon Survey	·	1.9 km	MPC · JPL
309004	2006 UR_{57}	—	October 18, 2006	Kitt Peak	Spacewatch	KOR	1.1 km	MPC · JPL
309005	2006 UW_{73}	—	October 17, 2006	Kitt Peak	Spacewatch	NEM	2.2 km	MPC · JPL
309006	2006 UC_{77}	—	October 17, 2006	Kitt Peak	Spacewatch	·	2.5 km	MPC · JPL
309007	2006 UL_{77}	—	October 17, 2006	Kitt Peak	Spacewatch	HOF	3.0 km	MPC · JPL
309008	2006 UM_{78}	—	October 17, 2006	Kitt Peak	Spacewatch	EOS	2.7 km	MPC · JPL
309009	2006 UZ_{80}	—	October 17, 2006	Mount Lemmon	Mount Lemmon Survey	KOR	1.8 km	MPC · JPL
309010	2006 UB_{82}	—	October 17, 2006	Kitt Peak	Spacewatch	·	2.5 km	MPC · JPL
309011	2006 UE_{83}	—	October 17, 2006	Mount Lemmon	Mount Lemmon Survey	KOR	1.3 km	MPC · JPL
309012	2006 UG_{83}	—	October 17, 2006	Mount Lemmon	Mount Lemmon Survey	·	2.3 km	MPC · JPL
309013	2006 UM_{90}	—	October 17, 2006	Kitt Peak	Spacewatch	KOR	1.3 km	MPC · JPL
309014	2006 UQ_{90}	—	October 17, 2006	Kitt Peak	Spacewatch	·	1.1 km	MPC · JPL
309015	2006 UZ_{97}	—	October 18, 2006	Kitt Peak	Spacewatch	KOR	1.6 km	MPC · JPL
309016	2006 UH_{103}	—	October 18, 2006	Kitt Peak	Spacewatch	·	2.3 km	MPC · JPL
309017	2006 UC_{111}	—	October 19, 2006	Kitt Peak	Spacewatch	(13314)	1.9 km	MPC · JPL
309018	2006 US_{112}	—	October 19, 2006	Kitt Peak	Spacewatch	·	1.9 km	MPC · JPL
309019	2006 UO_{113}	—	October 19, 2006	Kitt Peak	Spacewatch	·	2.4 km	MPC · JPL
309020	2006 UY_{116}	—	October 19, 2006	Kitt Peak	Spacewatch	AST	1.7 km	MPC · JPL
309021	2006 UU_{119}	—	October 19, 2006	Kitt Peak	Spacewatch	KOR	1.4 km	MPC · JPL
309022	2006 UM_{124}	—	October 19, 2006	Mount Lemmon	Mount Lemmon Survey	·	1.7 km	MPC · JPL
309023	2006 UH_{130}	—	October 19, 2006	Kitt Peak	Spacewatch	·	1.9 km	MPC · JPL
309024	2006 UO_{130}	—	October 19, 2006	Kitt Peak	Spacewatch	KOR	1.2 km	MPC · JPL
309025	2006 UQ_{133}	—	September 25, 2006	Mount Lemmon	Mount Lemmon Survey	·	2.1 km	MPC · JPL
309026	2006 UA_{134}	—	October 19, 2006	Kitt Peak	Spacewatch	·	1.7 km	MPC · JPL
309027	2006 UD_{140}	—	October 19, 2006	Kitt Peak	Spacewatch	EOS	2.1 km	MPC · JPL
309028	2006 UR_{146}	—	October 20, 2006	Mount Lemmon	Mount Lemmon Survey	·	2.1 km	MPC · JPL
309029	2006 UP_{154}	—	October 21, 2006	Mount Lemmon	Mount Lemmon Survey	·	2.2 km	MPC · JPL
309030	2006 UZ_{155}	—	October 21, 2006	Mount Lemmon	Mount Lemmon Survey	HOF	2.8 km	MPC · JPL
309031	2006 UH_{160}	—	October 21, 2006	Mount Lemmon	Mount Lemmon Survey	KOR	1.9 km	MPC · JPL
309032	2006 UT_{172}	—	October 22, 2006	Kitt Peak	Spacewatch	·	1.1 km	MPC · JPL
309033	2006 UF_{176}	—	October 16, 2006	Catalina	CSS	·	2.8 km	MPC · JPL
309034	2006 UJ_{177}	—	October 16, 2006	Catalina	CSS	GEF	1.5 km	MPC · JPL
309035	2006 UV_{187}	—	October 19, 2006	Catalina	CSS	·	2.3 km	MPC · JPL
309036	2006 UH_{189}	—	October 19, 2006	Catalina	CSS	·	2.5 km	MPC · JPL
309037	2006 UR_{197}	—	October 20, 2006	Kitt Peak	Spacewatch	·	2.0 km	MPC · JPL
309038	2006 UL_{198}	—	October 20, 2006	Kitt Peak	Spacewatch	KOR	1.2 km	MPC · JPL
309039	2006 UL_{216}	—	October 29, 2006	Kitami	K. Endate	·	1.6 km	MPC · JPL
309040	2006 UK_{218}	—	October 30, 2006	Mount Nyukasa	Japan Aerospace Exploration Agency	·	1.2 km	MPC · JPL
309041	2006 UR_{221}	—	October 17, 2006	Kitt Peak	Spacewatch	·	2.5 km	MPC · JPL
309042	2006 UR_{234}	—	October 22, 2006	Mount Lemmon	Mount Lemmon Survey	·	3.4 km	MPC · JPL
309043	2006 UW_{241}	—	October 27, 2006	Kitt Peak	Spacewatch	·	1.3 km	MPC · JPL
309044	2006 UB_{246}	—	October 27, 2006	Mount Lemmon	Mount Lemmon Survey	·	1.7 km	MPC · JPL
309045	2006 UH_{247}	—	October 27, 2006	Mount Lemmon	Mount Lemmon Survey	·	1.9 km	MPC · JPL
309046	2006 UY_{253}	—	October 27, 2006	Mount Lemmon	Mount Lemmon Survey	KOR	1.2 km	MPC · JPL
309047	2006 UB_{254}	—	October 27, 2006	Mount Lemmon	Mount Lemmon Survey	·	1.8 km	MPC · JPL
309048	2006 UG_{256}	—	October 27, 2006	Mount Lemmon	Mount Lemmon Survey	THB	4.6 km	MPC · JPL
309049	2006 UV_{256}	—	October 28, 2006	Kitt Peak	Spacewatch	KOR	1.2 km	MPC · JPL
309050	2006 UB_{257}	—	October 28, 2006	Kitt Peak	Spacewatch	·	2.0 km	MPC · JPL
309051	2006 UW_{259}	—	October 28, 2006	Mount Lemmon	Mount Lemmon Survey	KOR	1.2 km	MPC · JPL
309052	2006 UU_{267}	—	October 27, 2006	Catalina	CSS	·	1.3 km	MPC · JPL
309053	2006 UM_{272}	—	October 27, 2006	Mount Lemmon	Mount Lemmon Survey	EMA	3.8 km	MPC · JPL
309054	2006 UY_{273}	—	October 27, 2006	Kitt Peak	Spacewatch	·	2.4 km	MPC · JPL
309055	2006 UX_{274}	—	October 28, 2006	Kitt Peak	Spacewatch	AGN	1.2 km	MPC · JPL
309056	2006 US_{282}	—	October 28, 2006	Kitt Peak	Spacewatch	·	2.2 km	MPC · JPL
309057	2006 UC_{284}	—	October 28, 2006	Kitt Peak	Spacewatch	·	1.6 km	MPC · JPL
309058	2006 UM_{284}	—	October 28, 2006	Kitt Peak	Spacewatch	·	1.1 km	MPC · JPL
309059	2006 UO_{284}	—	October 28, 2006	Mount Lemmon	Mount Lemmon Survey	KOR	1.5 km	MPC · JPL
309060	2006 UM_{286}	—	October 28, 2006	Kitt Peak	Spacewatch	·	1.6 km	MPC · JPL
309061	2006 UH_{320}	—	October 19, 2006	Kitt Peak	M. W. Buie	·	2.4 km	MPC · JPL
309062	2006 UR_{324}	—	October 19, 2006	Mount Lemmon	Mount Lemmon Survey	·	1.8 km	MPC · JPL
309063	2006 UU_{331}	—	October 21, 2006	Apache Point	A. C. Becker	·	2.0 km	MPC · JPL
309064	2006 US_{335}	—	October 19, 2006	Catalina	CSS	·	3.7 km	MPC · JPL
309065	2006 UZ_{338}	—	October 31, 2006	Mount Lemmon	Mount Lemmon Survey	·	4.6 km	MPC · JPL
309066	2006 UZ_{358}	—	October 20, 2006	Kitt Peak	Spacewatch	·	1.7 km	MPC · JPL
309067	2006 UB_{359}	—	October 20, 2006	Kitt Peak	Spacewatch	KOR	1.4 km	MPC · JPL
309068	2006 US_{360}	—	October 19, 2006	Catalina	CSS	·	3.5 km	MPC · JPL
309069	2006 VX_{5}	—	November 10, 2006	Kitt Peak	Spacewatch	·	1.8 km	MPC · JPL
309070	2006 VW_{6}	—	November 10, 2006	Kitt Peak	Spacewatch	KOR	1.5 km	MPC · JPL
309071	2006 VM_{7}	—	November 10, 2006	Kitt Peak	Spacewatch	·	2.2 km	MPC · JPL
309072	2006 VT_{10}	—	November 11, 2006	Catalina	CSS	AGN	1.6 km	MPC · JPL
309073	2006 VP_{22}	—	November 10, 2006	Kitt Peak	Spacewatch	·	4.0 km	MPC · JPL
309074	2006 VH_{23}	—	November 10, 2006	Kitt Peak	Spacewatch	·	2.3 km	MPC · JPL
309075	2006 VC_{24}	—	November 10, 2006	Kitt Peak	Spacewatch	KOR	1.5 km	MPC · JPL
309076	2006 VA_{34}	—	November 11, 2006	Catalina	CSS	KOR	1.7 km	MPC · JPL
309077	2006 VB_{42}	—	November 12, 2006	Mount Lemmon	Mount Lemmon Survey	·	2.4 km	MPC · JPL
309078	2006 VC_{46}	—	November 9, 2006	Kitt Peak	Spacewatch	NAE	2.4 km	MPC · JPL
309079	2006 VB_{52}	—	November 11, 2006	Kitt Peak	Spacewatch	KOR	1.3 km	MPC · JPL
309080	2006 VD_{56}	—	November 11, 2006	Kitt Peak	Spacewatch	·	2.1 km	MPC · JPL
309081	2006 VE_{57}	—	November 11, 2006	Kitt Peak	Spacewatch	·	1.5 km	MPC · JPL
309082	2006 VL_{65}	—	November 11, 2006	Kitt Peak	Spacewatch	KOR	1.6 km	MPC · JPL
309083	2006 VR_{65}	—	November 11, 2006	Kitt Peak	Spacewatch	KOR	1.8 km	MPC · JPL
309084	2006 VD_{72}	—	November 11, 2006	Mount Lemmon	Mount Lemmon Survey	·	1.3 km	MPC · JPL
309085	2006 VU_{72}	—	November 11, 2006	Mount Lemmon	Mount Lemmon Survey	·	3.6 km	MPC · JPL
309086	2006 VF_{74}	—	November 11, 2006	Kitt Peak	Spacewatch	·	3.3 km	MPC · JPL
309087	2006 VR_{75}	—	November 11, 2006	Kitt Peak	Spacewatch	·	3.1 km	MPC · JPL
309088	2006 VB_{84}	—	November 13, 2006	Mount Lemmon	Mount Lemmon Survey	·	1.6 km	MPC · JPL
309089	2006 VQ_{92}	—	November 15, 2006	Catalina	CSS	·	1.6 km	MPC · JPL
309090	2006 VW_{95}	—	November 14, 2006	Socorro	LINEAR	H	660 m	MPC · JPL
309091	2006 VC_{106}	—	November 13, 2006	Mount Lemmon	Mount Lemmon Survey	KOR	1.5 km	MPC · JPL
309092	2006 VY_{122}	—	November 14, 2006	Socorro	LINEAR	ADE ·	3.0 km	MPC · JPL
309093	2006 VA_{124}	—	November 14, 2006	Kitt Peak	Spacewatch	·	2.5 km	MPC · JPL
309094	2006 VW_{138}	—	November 15, 2006	Kitt Peak	Spacewatch	·	4.1 km	MPC · JPL
309095	2006 VL_{139}	—	November 15, 2006	Kitt Peak	Spacewatch	·	2.4 km	MPC · JPL
309096	2006 VT_{169}	—	November 10, 2006	Kitt Peak	Spacewatch	·	2.6 km	MPC · JPL
309097	2006 VE_{170}	—	November 11, 2006	Mount Lemmon	Mount Lemmon Survey	·	1.6 km	MPC · JPL
309098	2006 VB_{172}	—	November 1, 2006	Mount Lemmon	Mount Lemmon Survey	·	4.0 km	MPC · JPL
309099	2006 WC	—	November 16, 2006	7300	W. K. Y. Yeung	·	2.4 km	MPC · JPL
309100	2006 WS_{11}	—	November 16, 2006	Socorro	LINEAR	EOS	3.0 km	MPC · JPL

== 309101–309200 ==
back to top

Designation			Discovery			Properties		Ref
Permanent	Provisional	Named after	Date	Site	Discoverer(s)	Category	Diam.	Ref
309101	2006 WW_{42}	—	November 16, 2006	Kitt Peak	Spacewatch	·	2.6 km	MPC · JPL
309102	2006 WP_{56}	—	November 16, 2006	Kitt Peak	Spacewatch	EOS	2.6 km	MPC · JPL
309103	2006 WR_{63}	—	November 17, 2006	Mount Lemmon	Mount Lemmon Survey	EOS ·	5.2 km	MPC · JPL
309104	2006 WF_{71}	—	November 18, 2006	Kitt Peak	Spacewatch	KOR	1.4 km	MPC · JPL
309105	2006 WK_{73}	—	November 18, 2006	Kitt Peak	Spacewatch	·	2.7 km	MPC · JPL
309106	2006 WZ_{83}	—	November 18, 2006	Mount Lemmon	Mount Lemmon Survey	·	1.5 km	MPC · JPL
309107	2006 WR_{85}	—	November 18, 2006	Kitt Peak	Spacewatch	·	5.7 km	MPC · JPL
309108	2006 WZ_{88}	—	November 18, 2006	Kitt Peak	Spacewatch	EOS	2.7 km	MPC · JPL
309109	2006 WM_{93}	—	November 19, 2006	Kitt Peak	Spacewatch	·	3.2 km	MPC · JPL
309110	2006 WW_{104}	—	November 19, 2006	Kitt Peak	Spacewatch	·	2.5 km	MPC · JPL
309111	2006 WR_{113}	—	November 20, 2006	Kitt Peak	Spacewatch	·	3.4 km	MPC · JPL
309112	2006 WW_{118}	—	November 21, 2006	Catalina	CSS	EUN	1.6 km	MPC · JPL
309113	2006 WP_{120}	—	November 21, 2006	Socorro	LINEAR	·	1.4 km	MPC · JPL
309114	2006 WZ_{122}	—	November 21, 2006	Mount Lemmon	Mount Lemmon Survey	·	2.5 km	MPC · JPL
309115	2006 WX_{127}	—	November 24, 2006	Mount Nyukasa	Japan Aerospace Exploration Agency	·	3.2 km	MPC · JPL
309116	2006 WT_{128}	—	November 19, 2006	Kitt Peak	Spacewatch	THM	2.1 km	MPC · JPL
309117	2006 WT_{138}	—	November 19, 2006	Catalina	CSS	·	3.0 km	MPC · JPL
309118	2006 WQ_{149}	—	November 20, 2006	Kitt Peak	Spacewatch	·	2.0 km	MPC · JPL
309119	2006 WN_{153}	—	November 21, 2006	Mount Lemmon	Mount Lemmon Survey	·	2.0 km	MPC · JPL
309120	2006 WL_{174}	—	November 23, 2006	Kitt Peak	Spacewatch	·	2.8 km	MPC · JPL
309121	2006 WW_{177}	—	March 26, 2003	Kitt Peak	Spacewatch	·	3.3 km	MPC · JPL
309122	2006 WQ_{178}	—	November 24, 2006	Mount Lemmon	Mount Lemmon Survey	·	2.3 km	MPC · JPL
309123	2006 WH_{187}	—	November 23, 2006	Mount Lemmon	Mount Lemmon Survey	·	3.1 km	MPC · JPL
309124	2006 WM_{203}	—	November 16, 2006	Kitt Peak	Spacewatch	EOS ·	5.3 km	MPC · JPL
309125	2006 WY_{203}	—	November 27, 2006	Mount Lemmon	Mount Lemmon Survey	·	1.3 km	MPC · JPL
309126	2006 XF_{7}	—	December 9, 2006	Kitt Peak	Spacewatch	·	1.8 km	MPC · JPL
309127	2006 XR_{9}	—	December 9, 2006	Kitt Peak	Spacewatch	·	2.8 km	MPC · JPL
309128	2006 XY_{18}	—	December 11, 2006	Kitt Peak	Spacewatch	·	2.4 km	MPC · JPL
309129	2006 XM_{24}	—	December 12, 2006	Kitt Peak	Spacewatch	·	2.5 km	MPC · JPL
309130	2006 XU_{25}	—	December 12, 2006	Catalina	CSS	·	1.6 km	MPC · JPL
309131	2006 XG_{28}	—	December 13, 2006	Catalina	CSS	HYG	3.3 km	MPC · JPL
309132	2006 XP_{31}	—	December 12, 2006	Kitt Peak	Spacewatch	·	2.2 km	MPC · JPL
309133	2006 XU_{34}	—	December 11, 2006	Kitt Peak	Spacewatch	·	4.3 km	MPC · JPL
309134	2006 XB_{35}	—	December 11, 2006	Socorro	LINEAR	·	6.7 km	MPC · JPL
309135	2006 XT_{37}	—	December 11, 2006	Kitt Peak	Spacewatch	EOS	2.6 km	MPC · JPL
309136	2006 XQ_{38}	—	December 11, 2006	Kitt Peak	Spacewatch	EUN	1.5 km	MPC · JPL
309137	2006 XJ_{42}	—	December 12, 2006	Socorro	LINEAR	·	5.3 km	MPC · JPL
309138	2006 XY_{42}	—	December 12, 2006	Mount Lemmon	Mount Lemmon Survey	·	1.3 km	MPC · JPL
309139	2006 XQ_{51}	—	December 14, 2006	Mount Lemmon	Mount Lemmon Survey	centaur	39 km	MPC · JPL
309140	2006 XY_{54}	—	December 15, 2006	Socorro	LINEAR	·	2.2 km	MPC · JPL
309141	2006 XE_{59}	—	December 14, 2006	Kitt Peak	Spacewatch	·	3.7 km	MPC · JPL
309142	2006 XF_{60}	—	December 14, 2006	Kitt Peak	Spacewatch	·	2.9 km	MPC · JPL
309143	2006 XP_{66}	—	December 13, 2006	Mount Lemmon	Mount Lemmon Survey	·	7.3 km	MPC · JPL
309144	2006 YH_{4}	—	December 16, 2006	Mount Lemmon	Mount Lemmon Survey	·	3.8 km	MPC · JPL
309145	2006 YR_{6}	—	December 19, 2006	Eskridge	Farpoint	·	3.2 km	MPC · JPL
309146	2006 YQ_{7}	—	December 20, 2006	Palomar	NEAT	·	5.0 km	MPC · JPL
309147	2006 YD_{13}	—	December 23, 2006	Eskridge	Farpoint	·	4.5 km	MPC · JPL
309148	2006 YY_{16}	—	December 21, 2006	Mount Lemmon	Mount Lemmon Survey	·	2.9 km	MPC · JPL
309149	2006 YR_{27}	—	December 21, 2006	Kitt Peak	Spacewatch	URS	4.8 km	MPC · JPL
309150	2006 YM_{37}	—	December 21, 2006	Kitt Peak	Spacewatch	·	3.8 km	MPC · JPL
309151	2006 YB_{38}	—	December 21, 2006	Kitt Peak	Spacewatch	·	4.2 km	MPC · JPL
309152	2006 YW_{51}	—	December 26, 2006	Kitt Peak	Spacewatch	·	2.0 km	MPC · JPL
309153	2006 YW_{55}	—	December 26, 2006	Catalina	CSS	TIR	3.6 km	MPC · JPL
309154	2007 AF_{4}	—	January 8, 2007	Mount Lemmon	Mount Lemmon Survey	THM	2.9 km	MPC · JPL
309155	2007 AR_{4}	—	January 8, 2007	Mount Lemmon	Mount Lemmon Survey	THM	2.4 km	MPC · JPL
309156	2007 AS_{4}	—	January 8, 2007	Mount Lemmon	Mount Lemmon Survey	EOS	2.4 km	MPC · JPL
309157	2007 AW_{7}	—	January 9, 2007	Catalina	CSS	H	820 m	MPC · JPL
309158	2007 AV_{9}	—	January 8, 2007	Kitt Peak	Spacewatch	VER	3.8 km	MPC · JPL
309159	2007 AD_{17}	—	January 15, 2007	Catalina	CSS	·	4.1 km	MPC · JPL
309160	2007 AQ_{18}	—	January 10, 2007	Catalina	CSS	·	1.4 km	MPC · JPL
309161	2007 AW_{20}	—	January 10, 2007	Mount Lemmon	Mount Lemmon Survey	HYG	4.4 km	MPC · JPL
309162	2007 AZ_{27}	—	January 10, 2007	Mount Lemmon	Mount Lemmon Survey	WIT	1.2 km	MPC · JPL
309163	2007 AQ_{29}	—	January 9, 2007	Kitt Peak	Spacewatch	·	4.1 km	MPC · JPL
309164	2007 BX_{4}	—	January 17, 2007	Palomar	NEAT	EUP	5.2 km	MPC · JPL
309165	2007 BO_{7}	—	January 17, 2007	Catalina	CSS	H	680 m	MPC · JPL
309166	2007 BA_{8}	—	January 23, 2007	Socorro	LINEAR	·	1.3 km	MPC · JPL
309167	2007 BD_{18}	—	January 17, 2007	Palomar	NEAT	·	4.0 km	MPC · JPL
309168	2007 BC_{21}	—	January 22, 2007	Lulin	Lin, H.-C., Q. Ye	H	610 m	MPC · JPL
309169	2007 BL_{21}	—	January 24, 2007	Kitt Peak	Spacewatch	·	3.6 km	MPC · JPL
309170	2007 BT_{22}	—	January 24, 2007	Mount Lemmon	Mount Lemmon Survey	HYG	2.7 km	MPC · JPL
309171	2007 BZ_{31}	—	January 24, 2007	Mount Lemmon	Mount Lemmon Survey	·	940 m	MPC · JPL
309172	2007 BN_{49}	—	October 23, 2005	Catalina	CSS	(8737)	3.9 km	MPC · JPL
309173	2007 BQ_{60}	—	January 26, 2007	Kitt Peak	Spacewatch	·	3.2 km	MPC · JPL
309174	2007 BS_{64}	—	January 27, 2007	Kitt Peak	Spacewatch	·	3.1 km	MPC · JPL
309175	2007 BK_{68}	—	January 27, 2007	Mount Lemmon	Mount Lemmon Survey	·	1.3 km	MPC · JPL
309176	2007 BF_{75}	—	January 28, 2007	Mount Lemmon	Mount Lemmon Survey	·	1.7 km	MPC · JPL
309177	2007 CM_{3}	—	February 6, 2007	Kitt Peak	Spacewatch	·	1.2 km	MPC · JPL
309178	2007 CV_{5}	—	February 8, 2007	Mayhill	Lowe, A.	·	1.9 km	MPC · JPL
309179	2007 CZ_{6}	—	February 6, 2007	Kitt Peak	Spacewatch	·	2.8 km	MPC · JPL
309180	2007 CU_{9}	—	February 6, 2007	Palomar	NEAT	·	1.6 km	MPC · JPL
309181	2007 CF_{20}	—	February 6, 2007	Palomar	NEAT	CYB	5.4 km	MPC · JPL
309182	2007 CL_{20}	—	February 6, 2007	Palomar	NEAT	·	4.3 km	MPC · JPL
309183	2007 CE_{47}	—	February 8, 2007	Palomar	NEAT	·	1.8 km	MPC · JPL
309184	2007 CG_{52}	—	February 9, 2007	Catalina	CSS	·	4.4 km	MPC · JPL
309185	2007 CH_{60}	—	February 10, 2007	Palomar	NEAT	·	4.2 km	MPC · JPL
309186	2007 CK_{62}	—	February 13, 2007	Socorro	LINEAR	·	4.5 km	MPC · JPL
309187	2007 DJ_{13}	—	February 16, 2007	Palomar	NEAT	H	610 m	MPC · JPL
309188	2007 DV_{60}	—	February 23, 2007	Siding Spring	SSS	H	650 m	MPC · JPL
309189	2007 DR_{64}	—	February 21, 2007	Kitt Peak	Spacewatch	·	3.8 km	MPC · JPL
309190	2007 DZ_{79}	—	February 23, 2007	Catalina	CSS	·	4.3 km	MPC · JPL
309191	2007 EZ_{30}	—	March 10, 2007	Kitt Peak	Spacewatch	EOS	1.9 km	MPC · JPL
309192	2007 EN_{47}	—	March 9, 2007	Mount Lemmon	Mount Lemmon Survey	·	830 m	MPC · JPL
309193	2007 ET_{66}	—	March 10, 2007	Kitt Peak	Spacewatch	·	3.6 km	MPC · JPL
309194	2007 EF_{74}	—	March 10, 2007	Kitt Peak	Spacewatch	·	1.6 km	MPC · JPL
309195	2007 ED_{94}	—	March 10, 2007	Mount Lemmon	Mount Lemmon Survey	EUN	1.6 km	MPC · JPL
309196	2007 EY_{129}	—	March 9, 2007	Mount Lemmon	Mount Lemmon Survey	·	1.9 km	MPC · JPL
309197	2007 ED_{151}	—	March 12, 2007	Mount Lemmon	Mount Lemmon Survey	·	840 m	MPC · JPL
309198	2007 ES_{196}	—	March 15, 2007	Kitt Peak	Spacewatch	·	3.0 km	MPC · JPL
309199	2007 EZ_{199}	—	March 10, 2007	Purple Mountain	PMO NEO Survey Program	·	2.1 km	MPC · JPL
309200	2007 EY_{211}	—	March 8, 2007	Palomar	NEAT	·	6.2 km	MPC · JPL

== 309201–309300 ==
back to top

Designation			Discovery			Properties		Ref
Permanent	Provisional	Named after	Date	Site	Discoverer(s)	Category	Diam.	Ref
309201	2007 EU_{215}	—	March 12, 2007	Catalina	CSS	EOS	3.1 km	MPC · JPL
309202	2007 FB_{2}	—	March 16, 2007	Catalina	CSS	LIX	5.2 km	MPC · JPL
309203	2007 GG	—	April 7, 2007	Mauna Kea	D. J. Tholen	AMO +1km	990 m	MPC · JPL
309204	2007 GF_{25}	—	April 12, 2007	Črni Vrh	B. Dintinjana, H. Mikuž	·	4.1 km	MPC · JPL
309205	2007 GV_{27}	—	April 11, 2007	Catalina	CSS	·	3.7 km	MPC · JPL
309206 Mažvydas	2007 GE_{32}	Mažvydas	April 14, 2007	Moletai	K. Černis, J. Zdanavičius	H	670 m	MPC · JPL
309207	2007 GP_{71}	—	April 15, 2007	Catalina	CSS	H	830 m	MPC · JPL
309208	2007 HZ_{14}	—	April 22, 2007	Ottmarsheim	C. Rinner	H	860 m	MPC · JPL
309209	2007 HN_{15}	—	April 19, 2007	Pla D'Arguines	R. Ferrando	VER	4.3 km	MPC · JPL
309210	2007 HS_{28}	—	April 19, 2007	Mount Lemmon	Mount Lemmon Survey	·	2.2 km	MPC · JPL
309211	2007 HJ_{81}	—	April 25, 2007	Mount Lemmon	Mount Lemmon Survey	·	840 m	MPC · JPL
309212	2007 JS_{9}	—	May 10, 2007	Mayhill	Lowe, A.	·	1.7 km	MPC · JPL
309213	2007 JQ_{22}	—	May 11, 2007	Catalina	CSS	·	1.0 km	MPC · JPL
309214	2007 LL	—	June 8, 2007	Catalina	CSS	ATE · critical	280 m	MPC · JPL
309215	2007 LN_{18}	—	June 14, 2007	Catalina	CSS	·	2.5 km	MPC · JPL
309216	2007 MG_{24}	—	June 21, 2007	Mount Lemmon	Mount Lemmon Survey	T_{j} (2.94)	5.7 km	MPC · JPL
309217	2007 NF_{6}	—	July 10, 2007	Siding Spring	SSS	·	1.4 km	MPC · JPL
309218	2007 OE_{7}	—	July 24, 2007	Reedy Creek	J. Broughton	·	1.1 km	MPC · JPL
309219	2007 PV_{10}	—	August 11, 2007	Socorro	LINEAR	PHO	1.8 km	MPC · JPL
309220	2007 PV_{12}	—	August 8, 2007	Socorro	LINEAR	·	1.3 km	MPC · JPL
309221	2007 PO_{20}	—	August 9, 2007	Socorro	LINEAR	·	1.3 km	MPC · JPL
309222	2007 PU_{21}	—	August 9, 2007	Socorro	LINEAR	·	2.1 km	MPC · JPL
309223	2007 PX_{21}	—	August 9, 2007	Socorro	LINEAR	·	2.0 km	MPC · JPL
309224	2007 PD_{33}	—	August 9, 2007	Socorro	LINEAR	·	1.2 km	MPC · JPL
309225	2007 PC_{40}	—	August 10, 2007	Kitt Peak	Spacewatch	·	1.1 km	MPC · JPL
309226	2007 PF_{44}	—	August 14, 2007	Siding Spring	SSS	ERI	1.9 km	MPC · JPL
309227 Tsukiko	2007 QC	Tsukiko	August 16, 2007	San Marcello	M. Mazzucato, Dolfi, F.	·	880 m	MPC · JPL
309228	2007 QM_{1}	—	August 16, 2007	Črni Vrh	Skvarč, J.	NYS	1.3 km	MPC · JPL
309229	2007 QO_{2}	—	August 18, 2007	Gaisberg	Gierlinger, R.	·	800 m	MPC · JPL
309230	2007 QY_{6}	—	August 21, 2007	Anderson Mesa	LONEOS	MAS	880 m	MPC · JPL
309231	2007 QT_{9}	—	August 22, 2007	Socorro	LINEAR	MAS	1.0 km	MPC · JPL
309232	2007 QV_{9}	—	August 22, 2007	Socorro	LINEAR	NYS	1.4 km	MPC · JPL
309233	2007 QE_{11}	—	August 23, 2007	Kitt Peak	Spacewatch	·	760 m	MPC · JPL
309234	2007 QB_{16}	—	August 23, 2007	Kitt Peak	Spacewatch	MAS	770 m	MPC · JPL
309235	2007 QB_{18}	—	August 24, 2007	Kitt Peak	Spacewatch	·	1.3 km	MPC · JPL
309236	2007 RW	—	September 3, 2007	Eskridge	G. Hug	·	1.3 km	MPC · JPL
309237	2007 RB_{2}	—	September 4, 2007	Junk Bond	D. Healy	NYS	1.4 km	MPC · JPL
309238	2007 RV_{10}	—	September 11, 2007	Great Shefford	Birtwhistle, P.	·	1.2 km	MPC · JPL
309239	2007 RW_{10}	—	September 9, 2007	Palomar	Palomar	centaur	247 km	MPC · JPL
309240	2007 RR_{11}	—	September 10, 2007	Dauban	Chante-Perdrix	V	840 m	MPC · JPL
309241	2007 RC_{17}	—	September 13, 2007	Catalina	CSS	PHO	1.5 km	MPC · JPL
309242	2007 RN_{24}	—	September 4, 2007	Charleston	Astronomical Research Observatory	V	840 m	MPC · JPL
309243	2007 RM_{28}	—	September 4, 2007	Catalina	CSS	NYS	1.2 km	MPC · JPL
309244	2007 RU_{28}	—	September 4, 2007	Mount Lemmon	Mount Lemmon Survey	·	1.0 km	MPC · JPL
309245	2007 RJ_{29}	—	September 4, 2007	Catalina	CSS	·	1.3 km	MPC · JPL
309246	2007 RG_{32}	—	September 5, 2007	Catalina	CSS	·	1.6 km	MPC · JPL
309247	2007 RQ_{32}	—	September 5, 2007	Catalina	CSS	NYS	1.7 km	MPC · JPL
309248	2007 RL_{33}	—	September 5, 2007	Catalina	CSS	·	1.7 km	MPC · JPL
309249	2007 RP_{38}	—	September 8, 2007	Anderson Mesa	LONEOS	·	1.2 km	MPC · JPL
309250	2007 RZ_{38}	—	September 8, 2007	Anderson Mesa	LONEOS	·	2.3 km	MPC · JPL
309251	2007 RW_{39}	—	September 9, 2007	Mount Lemmon	Mount Lemmon Survey	V	780 m	MPC · JPL
309252	2007 RT_{41}	—	September 9, 2007	Anderson Mesa	LONEOS	·	960 m	MPC · JPL
309253	2007 RC_{42}	—	September 9, 2007	Kitt Peak	Spacewatch	·	1.2 km	MPC · JPL
309254	2007 RL_{44}	—	September 9, 2007	Kitt Peak	Spacewatch	·	1.2 km	MPC · JPL
309255	2007 RD_{52}	—	September 9, 2007	Kitt Peak	Spacewatch	·	2.1 km	MPC · JPL
309256	2007 RH_{53}	—	September 9, 2007	Kitt Peak	Spacewatch	MAR	1.1 km	MPC · JPL
309257	2007 RC_{58}	—	September 9, 2007	Anderson Mesa	LONEOS	NYS	1.4 km	MPC · JPL
309258	2007 RX_{68}	—	September 10, 2007	Kitt Peak	Spacewatch	V	960 m	MPC · JPL
309259	2007 RA_{69}	—	September 10, 2007	Kitt Peak	Spacewatch	·	1.4 km	MPC · JPL
309260	2007 RE_{83}	—	September 10, 2007	Mount Lemmon	Mount Lemmon Survey	·	1.1 km	MPC · JPL
309261	2007 RK_{93}	—	September 10, 2007	Kitt Peak	Spacewatch	NYS	1.4 km	MPC · JPL
309262	2007 RZ_{93}	—	September 10, 2007	Kitt Peak	Spacewatch	NYS	1.4 km	MPC · JPL
309263	2007 RZ_{94}	—	September 10, 2007	Kitt Peak	Spacewatch	NYS	960 m	MPC · JPL
309264	2007 RA_{95}	—	September 10, 2007	Kitt Peak	Spacewatch	·	1.5 km	MPC · JPL
309265	2007 RD_{98}	—	September 10, 2007	Kitt Peak	Spacewatch	NYS	1.3 km	MPC · JPL
309266	2007 RT_{102}	—	September 11, 2007	Kitt Peak	Spacewatch	MAS	820 m	MPC · JPL
309267	2007 RV_{102}	—	September 11, 2007	Kitt Peak	Spacewatch	·	920 m	MPC · JPL
309268	2007 RX_{102}	—	September 11, 2007	Kitt Peak	Spacewatch	MAS	820 m	MPC · JPL
309269	2007 RM_{109}	—	September 11, 2007	Kitt Peak	Spacewatch	NYS	1.3 km	MPC · JPL
309270	2007 RW_{113}	—	September 11, 2007	Kitt Peak	Spacewatch	V	920 m	MPC · JPL
309271	2007 RN_{116}	—	September 11, 2007	Kitt Peak	Spacewatch	·	1.2 km	MPC · JPL
309272	2007 RW_{119}	—	September 11, 2007	Purple Mountain	PMO NEO Survey Program	·	1.1 km	MPC · JPL
309273	2007 RD_{128}	—	September 12, 2007	Mount Lemmon	Mount Lemmon Survey	·	970 m	MPC · JPL
309274	2007 RB_{133}	—	September 15, 2007	Taunus	E. Schwab, R. Kling	·	1.8 km	MPC · JPL
309275	2007 RF_{134}	—	September 12, 2007	Catalina	CSS	·	2.0 km	MPC · JPL
309276	2007 RE_{136}	—	September 14, 2007	Mount Lemmon	Mount Lemmon Survey	·	1.3 km	MPC · JPL
309277	2007 RX_{138}	—	September 15, 2007	Lulin	LUSS	NYS	1.2 km	MPC · JPL
309278	2007 RZ_{139}	—	September 13, 2007	Socorro	LINEAR	MAS	860 m	MPC · JPL
309279	2007 RQ_{141}	—	September 13, 2007	Socorro	LINEAR	(5)	1.6 km	MPC · JPL
309280	2007 RC_{144}	—	September 14, 2007	Socorro	LINEAR	V	720 m	MPC · JPL
309281	2007 RL_{149}	—	September 12, 2007	Catalina	CSS	V	1.1 km	MPC · JPL
309282	2007 RM_{157}	—	September 11, 2007	Purple Mountain	PMO NEO Survey Program	·	940 m	MPC · JPL
309283	2007 RE_{158}	—	September 12, 2007	Catalina	CSS	NYS	1.5 km	MPC · JPL
309284	2007 RG_{158}	—	March 25, 2006	Kitt Peak	Spacewatch	V	860 m	MPC · JPL
309285	2007 RO_{195}	—	September 12, 2007	Kitt Peak	Spacewatch	·	1.3 km	MPC · JPL
309286	2007 RV_{202}	—	September 13, 2007	Kitt Peak	Spacewatch	·	930 m	MPC · JPL
309287	2007 RF_{206}	—	September 10, 2007	Kitt Peak	Spacewatch	MAS	900 m	MPC · JPL
309288	2007 RX_{208}	—	September 10, 2007	Kitt Peak	Spacewatch	·	1.2 km	MPC · JPL
309289	2007 RP_{209}	—	September 10, 2007	Kitt Peak	Spacewatch	·	1.2 km	MPC · JPL
309290	2007 RB_{219}	—	September 14, 2007	Mount Lemmon	Mount Lemmon Survey	·	2.7 km	MPC · JPL
309291	2007 RP_{221}	—	September 14, 2007	Mount Lemmon	Mount Lemmon Survey	·	1.1 km	MPC · JPL
309292	2007 RM_{222}	—	September 14, 2007	Mount Lemmon	Mount Lemmon Survey	NYS	1.4 km	MPC · JPL
309293	2007 RF_{226}	—	September 10, 2007	Mount Lemmon	Mount Lemmon Survey	·	1.6 km	MPC · JPL
309294	2007 RB_{227}	—	September 10, 2007	Kitt Peak	Spacewatch	·	1.4 km	MPC · JPL
309295 Hourenzhi	2007 RX_{228}	Hourenzhi	November 2, 2000	Socorro	LINEAR	MAS	1.1 km	MPC · JPL
309296	2007 RP_{232}	—	September 11, 2007	Purple Mountain	PMO NEO Survey Program	NYS	1.5 km	MPC · JPL
309297	2007 RU_{235}	—	September 12, 2007	Catalina	CSS	·	1.4 km	MPC · JPL
309298	2007 RJ_{239}	—	September 14, 2007	Catalina	CSS	·	1.7 km	MPC · JPL
309299	2007 RJ_{240}	—	September 14, 2007	Mount Lemmon	Mount Lemmon Survey	MAS	900 m	MPC · JPL
309300	2007 RF_{242}	—	September 15, 2007	Socorro	LINEAR	·	1.5 km	MPC · JPL

== 309301–309400 ==
back to top

Designation			Discovery			Properties		Ref
Permanent	Provisional	Named after	Date	Site	Discoverer(s)	Category	Diam.	Ref
309301	2007 RO_{242}	—	September 15, 2007	Socorro	LINEAR	NYS	1.0 km	MPC · JPL
309302	2007 RL_{243}	—	September 15, 2007	Socorro	LINEAR	·	1.1 km	MPC · JPL
309303	2007 RV_{246}	—	September 12, 2007	Catalina	CSS	·	2.5 km	MPC · JPL
309304	2007 RU_{254}	—	September 14, 2007	Kitt Peak	Spacewatch	·	1.1 km	MPC · JPL
309305	2007 RN_{261}	—	September 14, 2007	Kitt Peak	Spacewatch	·	530 m	MPC · JPL
309306	2007 RE_{269}	—	September 15, 2007	Mount Lemmon	Mount Lemmon Survey	MAS	770 m	MPC · JPL
309307	2007 RG_{269}	—	September 15, 2007	Kitt Peak	Spacewatch	·	860 m	MPC · JPL
309308	2007 RH_{284}	—	September 10, 2007	Mount Lemmon	Mount Lemmon Survey	·	1.2 km	MPC · JPL
309309	2007 RQ_{284}	—	September 12, 2007	Catalina	CSS	·	1.4 km	MPC · JPL
309310	2007 RJ_{286}	—	September 3, 2007	Catalina	CSS	V	720 m	MPC · JPL
309311	2007 RZ_{286}	—	September 5, 2007	Catalina	CSS	NYS	1.4 km	MPC · JPL
309312	2007 RA_{287}	—	September 5, 2007	Catalina	CSS	·	1.4 km	MPC · JPL
309313	2007 RG_{290}	—	September 9, 2007	Kitt Peak	Spacewatch	·	1.5 km	MPC · JPL
309314	2007 RB_{294}	—	September 13, 2007	Kitt Peak	Spacewatch	V	870 m	MPC · JPL
309315	2007 RK_{310}	—	September 5, 2007	Catalina	CSS	·	1.6 km	MPC · JPL
309316	2007 RD_{311}	—	September 4, 2007	Catalina	CSS	·	1.3 km	MPC · JPL
309317	2007 RF_{311}	—	September 5, 2007	Siding Spring	SSS	PHO	1.6 km	MPC · JPL
309318	2007 RR_{315}	—	September 12, 2007	Catalina	CSS	·	1.4 km	MPC · JPL
309319	2007 SO	—	September 17, 2007	La Sagra	OAM	·	3.4 km	MPC · JPL
309320	2007 SZ	—	September 17, 2007	La Sagra	OAM	·	1.8 km	MPC · JPL
309321	2007 SC_{3}	—	September 16, 2007	Socorro	LINEAR	·	1.7 km	MPC · JPL
309322	2007 SQ_{4}	—	September 20, 2007	Remanzacco	Remanzacco	NYS	1.1 km	MPC · JPL
309323	2007 SZ_{4}	—	September 18, 2007	Socorro	LINEAR	NYS	1.7 km	MPC · JPL
309324	2007 SA_{5}	—	September 18, 2007	Socorro	LINEAR	·	1.4 km	MPC · JPL
309325	2007 SF_{6}	—	September 21, 2007	Schiaparelli	Schiaparelli	·	1.6 km	MPC · JPL
309326	2007 SV_{6}	—	September 18, 2007	Anderson Mesa	LONEOS	·	1.4 km	MPC · JPL
309327	2007 SL_{8}	—	September 18, 2007	Kitt Peak	Spacewatch	MAS	890 m	MPC · JPL
309328	2007 SB_{9}	—	September 18, 2007	Kitt Peak	Spacewatch	·	1.2 km	MPC · JPL
309329	2007 SS_{10}	—	September 20, 2007	Catalina	CSS	·	1.8 km	MPC · JPL
309330	2007 ST_{11}	—	September 23, 2007	Farra d'Isonzo	Farra d'Isonzo	·	1.3 km	MPC · JPL
309331	2007 SZ_{16}	—	September 30, 2007	Kitt Peak	Spacewatch	·	740 m	MPC · JPL
309332	2007 SQ_{18}	—	September 19, 2007	Kitt Peak	Spacewatch	·	1.1 km	MPC · JPL
309333	2007 SH_{23}	—	September 25, 2007	Mount Lemmon	Mount Lemmon Survey	V	910 m	MPC · JPL
309334	2007 TJ_{2}	—	October 4, 2007	Kitt Peak	Spacewatch	NYS	1.2 km	MPC · JPL
309335	2007 TJ_{5}	—	October 5, 2007	La Cañada	Lacruz, J.	·	1.1 km	MPC · JPL
309336	2007 TO_{5}	—	October 6, 2007	Socorro	LINEAR	NYS	1.2 km	MPC · JPL
309337	2007 TR_{5}	—	October 6, 2007	Socorro	LINEAR	NYS	1.2 km	MPC · JPL
309338	2007 TT_{5}	—	October 6, 2007	Socorro	LINEAR	·	1.3 km	MPC · JPL
309339	2007 TA_{6}	—	October 6, 2007	Socorro	LINEAR	MAS	860 m	MPC · JPL
309340	2007 TR_{10}	—	October 6, 2007	Socorro	LINEAR	MAS	730 m	MPC · JPL
309341	2007 TS_{10}	—	October 6, 2007	Socorro	LINEAR	·	1.3 km	MPC · JPL
309342	2007 TM_{21}	—	October 9, 2007	Dauban	Chante-Perdrix	NYS	1.2 km	MPC · JPL
309343	2007 TO_{25}	—	October 4, 2007	Kitt Peak	Spacewatch	·	1.2 km	MPC · JPL
309344	2007 TZ_{26}	—	October 4, 2007	Kitt Peak	Spacewatch	·	1.4 km	MPC · JPL
309345	2007 TP_{31}	—	October 5, 2007	Kitt Peak	Spacewatch	·	1.8 km	MPC · JPL
309346	2007 TR_{44}	—	October 7, 2007	Mount Lemmon	Mount Lemmon Survey	MAS	730 m	MPC · JPL
309347	2007 TU_{44}	—	October 7, 2007	Catalina	CSS	·	1.4 km	MPC · JPL
309348	2007 TH_{49}	—	September 29, 2003	Kitt Peak	Spacewatch	NYS	1.0 km	MPC · JPL
309349	2007 TP_{51}	—	October 4, 2007	Kitt Peak	Spacewatch	NYS	1.0 km	MPC · JPL
309350	2007 TA_{52}	—	October 4, 2007	Kitt Peak	Spacewatch	·	2.0 km	MPC · JPL
309351	2007 TH_{53}	—	October 4, 2007	Kitt Peak	Spacewatch	·	790 m	MPC · JPL
309352	2007 TN_{53}	—	October 4, 2007	Kitt Peak	Spacewatch	·	1.6 km	MPC · JPL
309353	2007 TH_{56}	—	October 4, 2007	Kitt Peak	Spacewatch	·	1.3 km	MPC · JPL
309354	2007 TD_{60}	—	October 5, 2007	Kitt Peak	Spacewatch	·	1.2 km	MPC · JPL
309355	2007 TZ_{66}	—	October 12, 2007	Dauban	Chante-Perdrix	·	1.4 km	MPC · JPL
309356	2007 TO_{67}	—	October 7, 2007	Catalina	CSS	·	1.9 km	MPC · JPL
309357	2007 TJ_{69}	—	October 14, 2007	Altschwendt	W. Ries	MAS	710 m	MPC · JPL
309358	2007 TZ_{69}	—	October 10, 2007	Goodricke-Pigott	R. A. Tucker	·	1.5 km	MPC · JPL
309359	2007 TG_{72}	—	October 14, 2007	Kleť	Kleť	·	1.7 km	MPC · JPL
309360	2007 TL_{74}	—	October 13, 2007	Goodricke-Pigott	R. A. Tucker	·	2.1 km	MPC · JPL
309361	2007 TR_{75}	—	October 4, 2007	Catalina	CSS	·	1.1 km	MPC · JPL
309362	2007 TL_{89}	—	October 8, 2007	Mount Lemmon	Mount Lemmon Survey	(5)	1.0 km	MPC · JPL
309363	2007 TQ_{89}	—	October 8, 2007	Mount Lemmon	Mount Lemmon Survey	·	1.3 km	MPC · JPL
309364	2007 TC_{95}	—	October 7, 2007	Catalina	CSS	·	2.1 km	MPC · JPL
309365	2007 TO_{97}	—	October 8, 2007	Anderson Mesa	LONEOS	NYS	1.5 km	MPC · JPL
309366	2007 TF_{98}	—	October 8, 2007	Mount Lemmon	Mount Lemmon Survey	NYS	1.4 km	MPC · JPL
309367	2007 TX_{102}	—	October 8, 2007	Mount Lemmon	Mount Lemmon Survey	NYS	1.5 km	MPC · JPL
309368	2007 TG_{104}	—	October 8, 2007	Mount Lemmon	Mount Lemmon Survey	·	990 m	MPC · JPL
309369	2007 TK_{104}	—	October 8, 2007	Mount Lemmon	Mount Lemmon Survey	·	1.4 km	MPC · JPL
309370	2007 TN_{108}	—	October 7, 2007	Catalina	CSS	·	1.6 km	MPC · JPL
309371	2007 TZ_{112}	—	October 8, 2007	Catalina	CSS	·	2.6 km	MPC · JPL
309372	2007 TK_{113}	—	October 8, 2007	Anderson Mesa	LONEOS	·	2.0 km	MPC · JPL
309373	2007 TW_{113}	—	October 8, 2007	Anderson Mesa	LONEOS	·	1.6 km	MPC · JPL
309374	2007 TL_{114}	—	October 8, 2007	Catalina	CSS	·	1.3 km	MPC · JPL
309375	2007 TO_{114}	—	October 8, 2007	Catalina	CSS	·	990 m	MPC · JPL
309376	2007 TK_{126}	—	October 6, 2007	Kitt Peak	Spacewatch	NYS	1.3 km	MPC · JPL
309377	2007 TT_{126}	—	October 6, 2007	Kitt Peak	Spacewatch	(5)	1.0 km	MPC · JPL
309378	2007 TG_{131}	—	October 7, 2007	Mount Lemmon	Mount Lemmon Survey	·	1.5 km	MPC · JPL
309379	2007 TK_{131}	—	October 7, 2007	Mount Lemmon	Mount Lemmon Survey	·	1.6 km	MPC · JPL
309380	2007 TG_{132}	—	October 7, 2007	Mount Lemmon	Mount Lemmon Survey	·	1.6 km	MPC · JPL
309381	2007 TJ_{134}	—	October 7, 2007	Mount Lemmon	Mount Lemmon Survey	·	1.7 km	MPC · JPL
309382	2007 TE_{138}	—	October 8, 2007	Mount Lemmon	Mount Lemmon Survey	(5)	1.4 km	MPC · JPL
309383	2007 TD_{147}	—	October 7, 2007	Socorro	LINEAR	V	960 m	MPC · JPL
309384	2007 TF_{148}	—	October 7, 2007	Socorro	LINEAR	ERI	2.2 km	MPC · JPL
309385	2007 TU_{148}	—	October 8, 2007	Socorro	LINEAR	·	1.3 km	MPC · JPL
309386	2007 TC_{150}	—	October 9, 2007	Socorro	LINEAR	·	1.1 km	MPC · JPL
309387	2007 TH_{150}	—	October 9, 2007	Socorro	LINEAR	·	1.5 km	MPC · JPL
309388	2007 TK_{152}	—	October 9, 2007	Socorro	LINEAR	·	1.2 km	MPC · JPL
309389	2007 TE_{170}	—	October 12, 2007	Socorro	LINEAR	·	1.1 km	MPC · JPL
309390	2007 TL_{170}	—	October 12, 2007	Socorro	LINEAR	·	620 m	MPC · JPL
309391	2007 TO_{185}	—	October 13, 2007	Socorro	LINEAR	·	1.2 km	MPC · JPL
309392	2007 TB_{186}	—	October 13, 2007	Socorro	LINEAR	·	1.3 km	MPC · JPL
309393	2007 TG_{186}	—	October 13, 2007	Socorro	LINEAR	·	1.5 km	MPC · JPL
309394	2007 TB_{194}	—	October 7, 2007	Catalina	CSS	·	1.4 km	MPC · JPL
309395	2007 TK_{201}	—	October 8, 2007	Kitt Peak	Spacewatch	MAS	690 m	MPC · JPL
309396	2007 TR_{202}	—	October 8, 2007	Mount Lemmon	Mount Lemmon Survey	·	1.6 km	MPC · JPL
309397	2007 TA_{218}	—	October 7, 2007	Kitt Peak	Spacewatch	·	1.7 km	MPC · JPL
309398	2007 TK_{218}	—	October 7, 2007	Kitt Peak	Spacewatch	(194)	1.8 km	MPC · JPL
309399	2007 TZ_{221}	—	October 9, 2007	Kitt Peak	Spacewatch	MAS	770 m	MPC · JPL
309400	2007 TR_{230}	—	October 8, 2007	Kitt Peak	Spacewatch	·	3.2 km	MPC · JPL

== 309401–309500 ==
back to top

Designation			Discovery			Properties		Ref
Permanent	Provisional	Named after	Date	Site	Discoverer(s)	Category	Diam.	Ref
309401	2007 TW_{237}	—	October 10, 2007	Kitt Peak	Spacewatch	·	1.0 km	MPC · JPL
309402	2007 TG_{240}	—	October 14, 2007	Socorro	LINEAR	·	1.6 km	MPC · JPL
309403	2007 TF_{253}	—	October 8, 2007	Mount Lemmon	Mount Lemmon Survey	NYS	1.1 km	MPC · JPL
309404	2007 TG_{258}	—	October 10, 2007	Mount Lemmon	Mount Lemmon Survey	·	1.3 km	MPC · JPL
309405	2007 TG_{262}	—	October 10, 2007	Kitt Peak	Spacewatch	·	1.4 km	MPC · JPL
309406	2007 TG_{275}	—	October 11, 2007	Catalina	CSS	·	1.3 km	MPC · JPL
309407	2007 TC_{280}	—	October 10, 2007	Mount Lemmon	Mount Lemmon Survey	NYS	1.2 km	MPC · JPL
309408	2007 TN_{280}	—	October 7, 2007	Catalina	CSS	·	2.8 km	MPC · JPL
309409	2007 TG_{289}	—	October 11, 2007	Catalina	CSS	·	2.1 km	MPC · JPL
309410	2007 TH_{292}	—	October 13, 2007	Catalina	CSS	·	2.0 km	MPC · JPL
309411	2007 TB_{303}	—	October 12, 2007	Kitt Peak	Spacewatch	MAS	800 m	MPC · JPL
309412	2007 TV_{317}	—	October 12, 2007	Kitt Peak	Spacewatch	·	1.5 km	MPC · JPL
309413	2007 TN_{322}	—	October 11, 2007	Kitt Peak	Spacewatch	·	1.8 km	MPC · JPL
309414	2007 TQ_{332}	—	October 11, 2007	Kitt Peak	Spacewatch	·	1.4 km	MPC · JPL
309415	2007 TE_{338}	—	October 13, 2007	Catalina	CSS	V	920 m	MPC · JPL
309416	2007 TX_{356}	—	October 12, 2007	Kitt Peak	Spacewatch	·	1.1 km	MPC · JPL
309417	2007 TD_{359}	—	October 14, 2007	Mount Lemmon	Mount Lemmon Survey	V	940 m	MPC · JPL
309418	2007 TC_{364}	—	October 14, 2007	Mount Lemmon	Mount Lemmon Survey	·	2.1 km	MPC · JPL
309419	2007 TM_{365}	—	October 9, 2007	Mount Lemmon	Mount Lemmon Survey	V	830 m	MPC · JPL
309420	2007 TD_{366}	—	October 9, 2007	Catalina	CSS	HNS	1.8 km	MPC · JPL
309421	2007 TJ_{367}	—	October 10, 2007	Catalina	CSS	·	1.7 km	MPC · JPL
309422	2007 TQ_{382}	—	October 14, 2007	Kitt Peak	Spacewatch	·	1.4 km	MPC · JPL
309423	2007 TS_{382}	—	October 14, 2007	Kitt Peak	Spacewatch	MAR	1.1 km	MPC · JPL
309424	2007 TW_{385}	—	October 15, 2007	Catalina	CSS	V	920 m	MPC · JPL
309425	2007 TH_{394}	—	October 15, 2007	Kitt Peak	Spacewatch	NYS	1.3 km	MPC · JPL
309426 Guidoschwarz	2007 TX_{412}	Guidoschwarz	May 25, 2006	Mauna Kea	P. A. Wiegert	·	1.3 km	MPC · JPL
309427	2007 TL_{419}	—	October 13, 2007	Mount Lemmon	Mount Lemmon Survey	·	1.3 km	MPC · JPL
309428	2007 TQ_{422}	—	October 9, 2007	Mount Lemmon	Mount Lemmon Survey	(5)	1.4 km	MPC · JPL
309429	2007 TJ_{426}	—	October 9, 2007	Catalina	CSS	PHO	3.3 km	MPC · JPL
309430	2007 TA_{446}	—	October 8, 2007	Mount Lemmon	Mount Lemmon Survey	·	1.1 km	MPC · JPL
309431	2007 TP_{446}	—	October 9, 2007	Kitt Peak	Spacewatch	·	1.2 km	MPC · JPL
309432	2007 TR_{448}	—	October 9, 2007	Socorro	LINEAR	·	1.1 km	MPC · JPL
309433	2007 UU_{5}	—	October 19, 2007	7300	W. K. Y. Yeung	MAS	840 m	MPC · JPL
309434	2007 UP_{14}	—	October 17, 2007	Anderson Mesa	LONEOS	MAS	880 m	MPC · JPL
309435	2007 UC_{20}	—	October 18, 2007	Mount Lemmon	Mount Lemmon Survey	NYS	1.2 km	MPC · JPL
309436	2007 UV_{20}	—	October 19, 2007	Mount Lemmon	Mount Lemmon Survey	NYS	1.2 km	MPC · JPL
309437	2007 UR_{24}	—	October 16, 2007	Kitt Peak	Spacewatch	·	1.1 km	MPC · JPL
309438	2007 UK_{25}	—	October 16, 2007	Kitt Peak	Spacewatch	V	920 m	MPC · JPL
309439	2007 UA_{31}	—	October 19, 2007	Catalina	CSS	·	1.6 km	MPC · JPL
309440	2007 UR_{38}	—	October 20, 2007	Catalina	CSS	·	1.8 km	MPC · JPL
309441	2007 US_{48}	—	October 20, 2007	Mount Lemmon	Mount Lemmon Survey	(5)	1.3 km	MPC · JPL
309442	2007 UT_{52}	—	October 24, 2007	Mount Lemmon	Mount Lemmon Survey	(5)	1.9 km	MPC · JPL
309443	2007 UT_{54}	—	October 30, 2007	Kitt Peak	Spacewatch	·	1.5 km	MPC · JPL
309444	2007 UK_{57}	—	October 30, 2007	Mount Lemmon	Mount Lemmon Survey	·	1.2 km	MPC · JPL
309445	2007 UF_{60}	—	October 30, 2007	Mount Lemmon	Mount Lemmon Survey	·	1.7 km	MPC · JPL
309446	2007 UK_{71}	—	October 30, 2007	Mount Lemmon	Mount Lemmon Survey	NYS	1.4 km	MPC · JPL
309447	2007 UU_{75}	—	October 31, 2007	Mount Lemmon	Mount Lemmon Survey	MAS	790 m	MPC · JPL
309448	2007 UA_{90}	—	October 30, 2007	Mount Lemmon	Mount Lemmon Survey	·	1.5 km	MPC · JPL
309449	2007 UC_{97}	—	October 30, 2007	Kitt Peak	Spacewatch	·	1.3 km	MPC · JPL
309450	2007 UC_{99}	—	October 30, 2007	Kitt Peak	Spacewatch	·	1.3 km	MPC · JPL
309451	2007 UX_{99}	—	October 30, 2007	Kitt Peak	Spacewatch	·	1.4 km	MPC · JPL
309452	2007 UM_{104}	—	October 30, 2007	Kitt Peak	Spacewatch	MAS	950 m	MPC · JPL
309453	2007 UX_{104}	—	October 30, 2007	Kitt Peak	Spacewatch	·	1.6 km	MPC · JPL
309454	2007 UM_{115}	—	October 31, 2007	Kitt Peak	Spacewatch	·	1.1 km	MPC · JPL
309455	2007 UE_{132}	—	October 19, 2007	Anderson Mesa	LONEOS	·	1.2 km	MPC · JPL
309456	2007 UC_{133}	—	October 21, 2007	Mount Lemmon	Mount Lemmon Survey	·	1.4 km	MPC · JPL
309457	2007 UD_{137}	—	October 16, 2007	Mount Lemmon	Mount Lemmon Survey	·	1.6 km	MPC · JPL
309458	2007 UF_{137}	—	October 18, 2007	Socorro	LINEAR	·	1.4 km	MPC · JPL
309459	2007 UG_{142}	—	October 21, 2007	Mount Lemmon	Mount Lemmon Survey	·	1.8 km	MPC · JPL
309460	2007 VC	—	November 1, 2007	7300	W. K. Y. Yeung	·	1.2 km	MPC · JPL
309461	2007 VA_{7}	—	November 1, 2007	Kitt Peak	Spacewatch	EUN	1.2 km	MPC · JPL
309462	2007 VZ_{7}	—	November 4, 2007	Mount Lemmon	Mount Lemmon Survey	·	4.6 km	MPC · JPL
309463	2007 VK_{10}	—	November 3, 2007	Needville	Needville	(5)	1.3 km	MPC · JPL
309464	2007 VY_{18}	—	November 1, 2007	Mount Lemmon	Mount Lemmon Survey	MAS	810 m	MPC · JPL
309465	2007 VC_{28}	—	November 2, 2007	Kitt Peak	Spacewatch	·	1.7 km	MPC · JPL
309466	2007 VO_{42}	—	November 3, 2007	Mount Lemmon	Mount Lemmon Survey	·	2.3 km	MPC · JPL
309467	2007 VA_{53}	—	November 1, 2007	Kitt Peak	Spacewatch	·	1.2 km	MPC · JPL
309468	2007 VB_{65}	—	November 1, 2007	Kitt Peak	Spacewatch	·	3.8 km	MPC · JPL
309469	2007 VJ_{65}	—	November 1, 2007	Kitt Peak	Spacewatch	(5)	1.6 km	MPC · JPL
309470	2007 VY_{73}	—	November 3, 2007	Kitt Peak	Spacewatch	·	1.4 km	MPC · JPL
309471	2007 VL_{76}	—	November 3, 2007	Kitt Peak	Spacewatch	·	1.3 km	MPC · JPL
309472	2007 VE_{91}	—	November 7, 2007	Calvin-Rehoboth	L. A. Molnar	·	1.3 km	MPC · JPL
309473	2007 VD_{96}	—	November 9, 2007	Calvin-Rehoboth	L. A. Molnar	·	1.2 km	MPC · JPL
309474	2007 VO_{102}	—	November 2, 2007	Purple Mountain	PMO NEO Survey Program	·	4.9 km	MPC · JPL
309475	2007 VQ_{105}	—	November 3, 2007	Kitt Peak	Spacewatch	·	940 m	MPC · JPL
309476	2007 VU_{109}	—	November 3, 2007	Kitt Peak	Spacewatch	·	1.1 km	MPC · JPL
309477	2007 VU_{112}	—	November 3, 2007	Kitt Peak	Spacewatch	·	1.3 km	MPC · JPL
309478	2007 VD_{113}	—	November 3, 2007	Kitt Peak	Spacewatch	·	900 m	MPC · JPL
309479	2007 VR_{116}	—	November 3, 2007	Kitt Peak	Spacewatch	·	1.7 km	MPC · JPL
309480	2007 VP_{118}	—	November 4, 2007	Mount Lemmon	Mount Lemmon Survey	·	1.2 km	MPC · JPL
309481	2007 VC_{144}	—	November 4, 2007	Kitt Peak	Spacewatch	(5)	1.5 km	MPC · JPL
309482	2007 VE_{148}	—	November 4, 2007	Kitt Peak	Spacewatch	·	2.1 km	MPC · JPL
309483	2007 VK_{152}	—	November 2, 2007	Kitt Peak	Spacewatch	·	1.3 km	MPC · JPL
309484	2007 VF_{164}	—	November 5, 2007	Kitt Peak	Spacewatch	·	1.4 km	MPC · JPL
309485	2007 VG_{198}	—	November 8, 2007	Mount Lemmon	Mount Lemmon Survey	·	2.0 km	MPC · JPL
309486	2007 VP_{202}	—	November 7, 2007	Mount Lemmon	Mount Lemmon Survey	·	1.3 km	MPC · JPL
309487	2007 VP_{207}	—	November 11, 2007	Mount Lemmon	Mount Lemmon Survey	·	1.1 km	MPC · JPL
309488	2007 VP_{208}	—	November 11, 2007	Catalina	CSS	MAR	1.5 km	MPC · JPL
309489	2007 VL_{237}	—	November 11, 2007	Mount Lemmon	Mount Lemmon Survey	·	1.0 km	MPC · JPL
309490	2007 VE_{239}	—	November 13, 2007	Kitt Peak	Spacewatch	·	1.1 km	MPC · JPL
309491	2007 VR_{250}	—	November 8, 2007	Catalina	CSS	MAR	1.2 km	MPC · JPL
309492	2007 VS_{266}	—	November 15, 2007	Anderson Mesa	LONEOS	·	1.5 km	MPC · JPL
309493	2007 VT_{269}	—	November 15, 2007	Socorro	LINEAR	·	1.9 km	MPC · JPL
309494	2007 VR_{274}	—	November 13, 2007	Catalina	CSS	PHO	1.5 km	MPC · JPL
309495	2007 VR_{290}	—	November 14, 2007	Kitt Peak	Spacewatch	·	1.2 km	MPC · JPL
309496	2007 VU_{294}	—	November 14, 2007	Mount Lemmon	Mount Lemmon Survey	JUN	1.4 km	MPC · JPL
309497	2007 VV_{299}	—	November 12, 2007	Catalina	CSS	JUN	1.5 km	MPC · JPL
309498	2007 VC_{306}	—	November 8, 2007	Mount Lemmon	Mount Lemmon Survey	·	2.0 km	MPC · JPL
309499	2007 VG_{307}	—	November 2, 2007	Kitt Peak	Spacewatch	·	1.5 km	MPC · JPL
309500	2007 VP_{308}	—	November 6, 2007	Mount Lemmon	Mount Lemmon Survey	JUN	1.6 km	MPC · JPL

== 309501–309600 ==
back to top

Designation			Discovery			Properties		Ref
Permanent	Provisional	Named after	Date	Site	Discoverer(s)	Category	Diam.	Ref
309501	2007 VN_{310}	—	November 8, 2007	Kitt Peak	Spacewatch	ADE	2.4 km	MPC · JPL
309502	2007 VG_{312}	—	November 11, 2007	Mount Lemmon	Mount Lemmon Survey	·	2.2 km	MPC · JPL
309503	2007 VP_{319}	—	November 8, 2007	Kitt Peak	Spacewatch	·	1.7 km	MPC · JPL
309504	2007 VD_{323}	—	November 2, 2007	Catalina	CSS	·	2.0 km	MPC · JPL
309505	2007 VU_{328}	—	November 9, 2007	Kitt Peak	Spacewatch	·	1.5 km	MPC · JPL
309506	2007 VK_{330}	—	November 3, 2007	Mount Lemmon	Mount Lemmon Survey	·	2.8 km	MPC · JPL
309507	2007 VG_{331}	—	November 5, 2007	Kitt Peak	Spacewatch	(5)	1.5 km	MPC · JPL
309508	2007 VR_{334}	—	November 14, 2007	Kitt Peak	Spacewatch	·	1.5 km	MPC · JPL
309509	2007 WM_{7}	—	November 18, 2007	Socorro	LINEAR	·	1.9 km	MPC · JPL
309510	2007 WU_{18}	—	November 18, 2007	Mount Lemmon	Mount Lemmon Survey	·	1.8 km	MPC · JPL
309511	2007 WK_{20}	—	November 18, 2007	Mount Lemmon	Mount Lemmon Survey	·	3.9 km	MPC · JPL
309512	2007 WR_{20}	—	November 18, 2007	Mount Lemmon	Mount Lemmon Survey	DOR	3.0 km	MPC · JPL
309513	2007 WU_{27}	—	November 18, 2007	Mount Lemmon	Mount Lemmon Survey	·	1.6 km	MPC · JPL
309514	2007 WD_{59}	—	November 18, 2007	Kitt Peak	Spacewatch	·	1.8 km	MPC · JPL
309515	2007 XR_{1}	—	December 3, 2007	Catalina	CSS	·	1.7 km	MPC · JPL
309516	2007 XZ_{2}	—	December 3, 2007	Kitt Peak	Spacewatch	·	1.4 km	MPC · JPL
309517	2007 XA_{3}	—	December 2, 2007	Lulin	LUSS	·	2.4 km	MPC · JPL
309518	2007 XK_{4}	—	December 3, 2007	Catalina	CSS	·	2.4 km	MPC · JPL
309519	2007 XZ_{5}	—	December 4, 2007	Catalina	CSS	·	1.8 km	MPC · JPL
309520	2007 XN_{8}	—	August 22, 2006	Palomar	NEAT	·	2.2 km	MPC · JPL
309521	2007 XE_{17}	—	March 8, 2005	Mount Lemmon	Mount Lemmon Survey	(5)	1.6 km	MPC · JPL
309522	2007 XX_{17}	—	December 11, 2007	La Sagra	OAM	·	1.6 km	MPC · JPL
309523	2007 XB_{21}	—	December 13, 2007	Dauban	Chante-Perdrix	ADE	3.3 km	MPC · JPL
309524	2007 XG_{24}	—	December 15, 2007	Wrightwood	J. W. Young	·	3.7 km	MPC · JPL
309525	2007 XA_{26}	—	December 15, 2007	Catalina	CSS	·	5.3 km	MPC · JPL
309526	2007 XJ_{28}	—	April 2, 2005	Mount Lemmon	Mount Lemmon Survey	·	1.8 km	MPC · JPL
309527	2007 XJ_{32}	—	December 15, 2007	Catalina	CSS	·	1.6 km	MPC · JPL
309528	2007 XA_{40}	—	December 13, 2007	Socorro	LINEAR	(5)	1.8 km	MPC · JPL
309529	2007 XR_{40}	—	December 13, 2007	Socorro	LINEAR	HNS	1.9 km	MPC · JPL
309530	2007 XN_{41}	—	December 15, 2007	Socorro	LINEAR	(5)	1.5 km	MPC · JPL
309531	2007 XO_{41}	—	December 15, 2007	Socorro	LINEAR	EUN	1.1 km	MPC · JPL
309532	2007 XO_{46}	—	December 15, 2007	Catalina	CSS	·	1.6 km	MPC · JPL
309533	2007 YC_{8}	—	December 16, 2007	Kitt Peak	Spacewatch	AGN	1.3 km	MPC · JPL
309534	2007 YK_{8}	—	December 16, 2007	Mount Lemmon	Mount Lemmon Survey	·	1.5 km	MPC · JPL
309535	2007 YW_{12}	—	December 17, 2007	Mount Lemmon	Mount Lemmon Survey	WIT	1.1 km	MPC · JPL
309536	2007 YJ_{16}	—	December 16, 2007	Kitt Peak	Spacewatch	MAR	1.4 km	MPC · JPL
309537	2007 YT_{20}	—	December 16, 2007	Kitt Peak	Spacewatch	·	2.5 km	MPC · JPL
309538	2007 YU_{20}	—	September 18, 2006	Catalina	CSS	HOF	2.6 km	MPC · JPL
309539	2007 YJ_{23}	—	December 17, 2007	Kitt Peak	Spacewatch	·	1.2 km	MPC · JPL
309540	2007 YK_{23}	—	December 17, 2007	Kitt Peak	Spacewatch	·	2.0 km	MPC · JPL
309541	2007 YA_{28}	—	December 18, 2007	Kitt Peak	Spacewatch	GEF	1.3 km	MPC · JPL
309542	2007 YL_{31}	—	December 28, 2007	Kitt Peak	Spacewatch	·	2.2 km	MPC · JPL
309543	2007 YG_{34}	—	December 28, 2007	Kitt Peak	Spacewatch	(5)	1.4 km	MPC · JPL
309544	2007 YE_{36}	—	December 30, 2007	Mount Lemmon	Mount Lemmon Survey	·	1.3 km	MPC · JPL
309545	2007 YV_{36}	—	December 17, 2007	Kitt Peak	Spacewatch	·	1.7 km	MPC · JPL
309546	2007 YR_{37}	—	December 30, 2007	Mount Lemmon	Mount Lemmon Survey	·	1.6 km	MPC · JPL
309547	2007 YL_{41}	—	December 30, 2007	Kitt Peak	Spacewatch	·	1.6 km	MPC · JPL
309548	2007 YZ_{42}	—	December 30, 2007	Catalina	CSS	·	2.5 km	MPC · JPL
309549	2007 YS_{46}	—	December 30, 2007	Mount Lemmon	Mount Lemmon Survey	·	1.9 km	MPC · JPL
309550	2007 YB_{47}	—	December 30, 2007	Mount Lemmon	Mount Lemmon Survey	·	2.4 km	MPC · JPL
309551	2007 YR_{48}	—	December 28, 2007	Kitt Peak	Spacewatch	·	1.3 km	MPC · JPL
309552	2007 YA_{55}	—	December 31, 2007	Kitt Peak	Spacewatch	·	2.4 km	MPC · JPL
309553	2007 YH_{55}	—	December 31, 2007	Mount Lemmon	Mount Lemmon Survey	·	2.5 km	MPC · JPL
309554	2007 YP_{55}	—	December 31, 2007	Mount Lemmon	Mount Lemmon Survey	·	1.6 km	MPC · JPL
309555	2007 YM_{58}	—	December 30, 2007	Kitt Peak	Spacewatch	·	2.2 km	MPC · JPL
309556	2007 YZ_{59}	—	December 29, 2007	Mayhill	Lowe, A.	·	4.5 km	MPC · JPL
309557	2007 YB_{61}	—	December 31, 2007	Catalina	CSS	·	2.1 km	MPC · JPL
309558	2007 YN_{71}	—	December 17, 2007	Kitt Peak	Spacewatch	AGN	1.2 km	MPC · JPL
309559	2007 YM_{74}	—	December 17, 2007	Mount Lemmon	Mount Lemmon Survey	·	2.7 km	MPC · JPL
309560	2008 AQ	—	January 1, 2008	Kitt Peak	Spacewatch	·	1.4 km	MPC · JPL
309561	2008 AW_{1}	—	January 8, 2008	Dauban	Kugel, F.	·	3.1 km	MPC · JPL
309562	2008 AM_{4}	—	January 9, 2008	Lulin	LUSS	·	1.8 km	MPC · JPL
309563	2008 AX_{11}	—	January 10, 2008	Mount Lemmon	Mount Lemmon Survey	AGN	990 m	MPC · JPL
309564	2008 AL_{16}	—	January 10, 2008	Mount Lemmon	Mount Lemmon Survey	·	1.6 km	MPC · JPL
309565	2008 AZ_{25}	—	January 10, 2008	Mount Lemmon	Mount Lemmon Survey	·	2.7 km	MPC · JPL
309566	2008 AV_{32}	—	January 14, 2008	Costitx	OAM	·	1.5 km	MPC · JPL
309567	2008 AH_{36}	—	January 10, 2008	Kitt Peak	Spacewatch	·	1.9 km	MPC · JPL
309568	2008 AX_{39}	—	January 10, 2008	Mount Lemmon	Mount Lemmon Survey	·	1.5 km	MPC · JPL
309569	2008 AG_{41}	—	January 10, 2008	Mount Lemmon	Mount Lemmon Survey	·	1.4 km	MPC · JPL
309570	2008 AE_{44}	—	January 10, 2008	Mount Lemmon	Mount Lemmon Survey	·	2.3 km	MPC · JPL
309571	2008 AU_{53}	—	January 11, 2008	Kitt Peak	Spacewatch	·	1.7 km	MPC · JPL
309572	2008 AC_{57}	—	January 11, 2008	Kitt Peak	Spacewatch	·	1.9 km	MPC · JPL
309573	2008 AM_{58}	—	January 11, 2008	Kitt Peak	Spacewatch	·	2.1 km	MPC · JPL
309574	2008 AO_{61}	—	January 11, 2008	Kitt Peak	Spacewatch	WIT	1.1 km	MPC · JPL
309575	2008 AY_{68}	—	January 11, 2008	Kitt Peak	Spacewatch	·	2.2 km	MPC · JPL
309576	2008 AC_{78}	—	January 12, 2008	Kitt Peak	Spacewatch	(12739)	2.1 km	MPC · JPL
309577	2008 AV_{81}	—	January 13, 2008	Mount Lemmon	Mount Lemmon Survey	·	2.5 km	MPC · JPL
309578	2008 AQ_{83}	—	January 15, 2008	Mount Lemmon	Mount Lemmon Survey	·	2.2 km	MPC · JPL
309579	2008 AC_{88}	—	January 13, 2008	Kitt Peak	Spacewatch	(11882)	1.7 km	MPC · JPL
309580	2008 AS_{93}	—	January 14, 2008	Kitt Peak	Spacewatch	PAD	2.8 km	MPC · JPL
309581	2008 AG_{95}	—	December 30, 2007	Kitt Peak	Spacewatch	·	2.3 km	MPC · JPL
309582	2008 AZ_{98}	—	April 19, 2004	Kitt Peak	Spacewatch	·	3.7 km	MPC · JPL
309583	2008 AM_{101}	—	January 15, 2008	Anderson Mesa	LONEOS	·	1.9 km	MPC · JPL
309584	2008 AR_{103}	—	January 15, 2008	Mount Lemmon	Mount Lemmon Survey	·	2.4 km	MPC · JPL
309585	2008 AQ_{105}	—	January 15, 2008	Mount Lemmon	Mount Lemmon Survey	·	2.8 km	MPC · JPL
309586	2008 AW_{110}	—	January 15, 2008	Kitt Peak	Spacewatch	THM	2.8 km	MPC · JPL
309587	2008 AJ_{112}	—	January 14, 2008	Bisei SG Center	BATTeRS	·	1.5 km	MPC · JPL
309588	2008 AR_{114}	—	January 11, 2008	Kitt Peak	Spacewatch	KOR	1.3 km	MPC · JPL
309589	2008 AH_{118}	—	January 14, 2008	Kitt Peak	Spacewatch	AGN	1.2 km	MPC · JPL
309590	2008 AT_{129}	—	January 10, 2008	Kitt Peak	Spacewatch	·	2.6 km	MPC · JPL
309591	2008 AO_{135}	—	January 11, 2008	Catalina	CSS	·	1.7 km	MPC · JPL
309592	2008 AX_{135}	—	January 11, 2008	Catalina	CSS	·	2.7 km	MPC · JPL
309593	2008 AF_{136}	—	January 12, 2008	Catalina	CSS	·	1.9 km	MPC · JPL
309594	2008 AE_{137}	—	January 15, 2008	Mount Lemmon	Mount Lemmon Survey	·	2.1 km	MPC · JPL
309595	2008 BY_{4}	—	January 16, 2008	Kitt Peak	Spacewatch	·	1.9 km	MPC · JPL
309596	2008 BD_{6}	—	January 16, 2008	Kitt Peak	Spacewatch	·	1.3 km	MPC · JPL
309597	2008 BK_{11}	—	January 18, 2008	Kitt Peak	Spacewatch	AGN	1.2 km	MPC · JPL
309598	2008 BM_{17}	—	January 30, 2008	Catalina	CSS	·	1.4 km	MPC · JPL
309599	2008 BH_{19}	—	January 30, 2008	Kitt Peak	Spacewatch	(5)	1.5 km	MPC · JPL
309600	2008 BD_{20}	—	January 30, 2008	Catalina	CSS	·	1.5 km	MPC · JPL

== 309601–309700 ==
back to top

Designation			Discovery			Properties		Ref
Permanent	Provisional	Named after	Date	Site	Discoverer(s)	Category	Diam.	Ref
309601	2008 BN_{24}	—	January 31, 2008	Catalina	CSS	·	1.1 km	MPC · JPL
309602	2008 BR_{25}	—	January 30, 2008	Catalina	CSS	·	1.4 km	MPC · JPL
309603	2008 BK_{26}	—	January 30, 2008	Kitt Peak	Spacewatch	·	2.3 km	MPC · JPL
309604	2008 BQ_{28}	—	January 30, 2008	Mount Lemmon	Mount Lemmon Survey	·	3.2 km	MPC · JPL
309605	2008 BY_{29}	—	January 30, 2008	Catalina	CSS	·	1.9 km	MPC · JPL
309606	2008 BJ_{32}	—	January 30, 2008	Mount Lemmon	Mount Lemmon Survey	·	1.7 km	MPC · JPL
309607	2008 BV_{34}	—	January 30, 2008	Mount Lemmon	Mount Lemmon Survey	TEL	1.8 km	MPC · JPL
309608	2008 BG_{37}	—	January 31, 2008	Mount Lemmon	Mount Lemmon Survey	KOR	1.2 km	MPC · JPL
309609	2008 BZ_{39}	—	January 30, 2008	Catalina	CSS	GEF	1.6 km	MPC · JPL
309610	2008 BH_{42}	—	January 31, 2008	Catalina	CSS	JUN	1.5 km	MPC · JPL
309611	2008 BK_{44}	—	March 10, 2003	Palomar	NEAT	·	4.1 km	MPC · JPL
309612	2008 BV_{45}	—	January 31, 2008	Catalina	CSS	HNS	1.7 km	MPC · JPL
309613	2008 BT_{46}	—	January 30, 2008	Mount Lemmon	Mount Lemmon Survey	·	1.8 km	MPC · JPL
309614	2008 CV_{6}	—	February 1, 2008	Mount Lemmon	Mount Lemmon Survey	(5)	1.6 km	MPC · JPL
309615	2008 CV_{9}	—	February 2, 2008	Mount Lemmon	Mount Lemmon Survey	·	1.7 km	MPC · JPL
309616	2008 CE_{23}	—	February 1, 2008	Kitt Peak	Spacewatch	·	2.5 km	MPC · JPL
309617	2008 CH_{23}	—	February 1, 2008	Kitt Peak	Spacewatch	·	3.9 km	MPC · JPL
309618	2008 CK_{25}	—	February 1, 2008	Kitt Peak	Spacewatch	·	2.2 km	MPC · JPL
309619	2008 CM_{25}	—	February 1, 2008	Catalina	CSS	·	3.5 km	MPC · JPL
309620	2008 CQ_{50}	—	February 6, 2008	Catalina	CSS	·	2.5 km	MPC · JPL
309621	2008 CJ_{56}	—	February 7, 2008	Mount Lemmon	Mount Lemmon Survey	NYS	1.5 km	MPC · JPL
309622	2008 CJ_{68}	—	February 5, 2008	La Sagra	OAM	JUN	1.3 km	MPC · JPL
309623	2008 CM_{71}	—	February 6, 2008	Catalina	CSS	·	3.3 km	MPC · JPL
309624	2008 CN_{79}	—	February 7, 2008	Kitt Peak	Spacewatch	HYG	3.8 km	MPC · JPL
309625	2008 CA_{85}	—	February 7, 2008	Kitt Peak	Spacewatch	·	2.1 km	MPC · JPL
309626	2008 CV_{88}	—	February 7, 2008	Mount Lemmon	Mount Lemmon Survey	·	3.3 km	MPC · JPL
309627	2008 CD_{98}	—	February 9, 2008	Kitt Peak	Spacewatch	KOR	1.4 km	MPC · JPL
309628	2008 CB_{99}	—	February 9, 2008	Kitt Peak	Spacewatch	EOS	2.7 km	MPC · JPL
309629	2008 CN_{100}	—	February 9, 2008	Kitt Peak	Spacewatch	TEL	1.9 km	MPC · JPL
309630	2008 CP_{121}	—	February 7, 2008	Kitt Peak	Spacewatch	·	1.7 km	MPC · JPL
309631	2008 CO_{128}	—	February 8, 2008	Kitt Peak	Spacewatch	KOR	1.4 km	MPC · JPL
309632	2008 CO_{134}	—	February 8, 2008	Mount Lemmon	Mount Lemmon Survey	·	2.4 km	MPC · JPL
309633	2008 CH_{152}	—	February 9, 2008	Kitt Peak	Spacewatch	·	2.3 km	MPC · JPL
309634	2008 CY_{156}	—	February 9, 2008	Kitt Peak	Spacewatch	·	2.5 km	MPC · JPL
309635	2008 CD_{165}	—	February 10, 2008	Mount Lemmon	Mount Lemmon Survey	MRX	1.2 km	MPC · JPL
309636	2008 CO_{165}	—	February 10, 2008	Kitt Peak	Spacewatch	·	1.8 km	MPC · JPL
309637	2008 CD_{177}	—	February 11, 2008	Socorro	LINEAR	·	2.1 km	MPC · JPL
309638	2008 CL_{178}	—	February 6, 2008	Catalina	CSS	·	2.5 km	MPC · JPL
309639	2008 CE_{180}	—	February 9, 2008	Catalina	CSS	EUN	1.6 km	MPC · JPL
309640	2008 CL_{182}	—	February 11, 2008	Mount Lemmon	Mount Lemmon Survey	·	5.0 km	MPC · JPL
309641	2008 CC_{192}	—	February 2, 2008	Kitt Peak	Spacewatch	·	3.2 km	MPC · JPL
309642	2008 CR_{195}	—	February 2, 2008	Kitt Peak	Spacewatch	615	1.5 km	MPC · JPL
309643	2008 CS_{195}	—	February 2, 2008	Kitt Peak	Spacewatch	·	2.2 km	MPC · JPL
309644	2008 CN_{199}	—	February 13, 2008	Mount Lemmon	Mount Lemmon Survey	·	3.0 km	MPC · JPL
309645	2008 CA_{202}	—	February 1, 2008	Kitt Peak	Spacewatch	·	2.6 km	MPC · JPL
309646	2008 CA_{212}	—	February 7, 2008	Socorro	LINEAR	·	2.8 km	MPC · JPL
309647	2008 CZ_{213}	—	February 10, 2008	Mount Lemmon	Mount Lemmon Survey	·	2.7 km	MPC · JPL
309648	2008 DR_{7}	—	February 24, 2008	Mount Lemmon	Mount Lemmon Survey	(16286)	2.4 km	MPC · JPL
309649	2008 DJ_{9}	—	February 25, 2008	Kitt Peak	Spacewatch	·	3.2 km	MPC · JPL
309650	2008 DF_{20}	—	February 28, 2008	Mount Lemmon	Mount Lemmon Survey	·	1.7 km	MPC · JPL
309651	2008 DC_{21}	—	February 28, 2008	Kitt Peak	Spacewatch	·	2.1 km	MPC · JPL
309652	2008 DP_{23}	—	February 24, 2008	Kitt Peak	Spacewatch	·	2.1 km	MPC · JPL
309653	2008 DS_{29}	—	February 26, 2008	Mount Lemmon	Mount Lemmon Survey	·	3.0 km	MPC · JPL
309654	2008 DP_{55}	—	February 26, 2008	Mount Lemmon	Mount Lemmon Survey	·	3.6 km	MPC · JPL
309655	2008 DT_{58}	—	February 27, 2008	Kitt Peak	Spacewatch	·	2.3 km	MPC · JPL
309656	2008 DH_{61}	—	February 28, 2008	Mount Lemmon	Mount Lemmon Survey	·	1.7 km	MPC · JPL
309657	2008 DO_{66}	—	February 29, 2008	Kitt Peak	Spacewatch	·	2.0 km	MPC · JPL
309658	2008 DM_{67}	—	February 29, 2008	Kitt Peak	Spacewatch	·	3.1 km	MPC · JPL
309659	2008 DV_{80}	—	February 24, 2008	Kitt Peak	Spacewatch	·	1.7 km	MPC · JPL
309660	2008 DL_{85}	—	February 28, 2008	Kitt Peak	Spacewatch	·	2.3 km	MPC · JPL
309661	2008 DR_{85}	—	February 28, 2008	Kitt Peak	Spacewatch	·	2.1 km	MPC · JPL
309662	2008 EE	—	March 1, 2008	Socorro	LINEAR	ATE	380 m	MPC · JPL
309663	2008 EO_{14}	—	March 1, 2008	Kitt Peak	Spacewatch	EOS	1.9 km	MPC · JPL
309664	2008 EE_{23}	—	March 3, 2008	Catalina	CSS	·	2.8 km	MPC · JPL
309665	2008 EP_{23}	—	March 3, 2008	Catalina	CSS	LUT	6.1 km	MPC · JPL
309666	2008 EK_{38}	—	March 4, 2008	Kitt Peak	Spacewatch	·	4.1 km	MPC · JPL
309667	2008 EA_{39}	—	March 4, 2008	Kitt Peak	Spacewatch	HYG	3.8 km	MPC · JPL
309668	2008 ET_{40}	—	March 4, 2008	Kitt Peak	Spacewatch	·	3.5 km	MPC · JPL
309669	2008 EE_{41}	—	March 4, 2008	Kitt Peak	Spacewatch	·	2.2 km	MPC · JPL
309670	2008 EP_{41}	—	March 4, 2008	Mount Lemmon	Mount Lemmon Survey	MRX	1.1 km	MPC · JPL
309671	2008 EN_{49}	—	March 6, 2008	Kitt Peak	Spacewatch	EOS	2.5 km	MPC · JPL
309672	2008 EA_{53}	—	March 6, 2008	Mount Lemmon	Mount Lemmon Survey	·	3.9 km	MPC · JPL
309673	2008 EE_{86}	—	March 7, 2008	Catalina	CSS	·	3.5 km	MPC · JPL
309674	2008 EN_{88}	—	March 11, 2008	Catalina	CSS	·	2.6 km	MPC · JPL
309675	2008 EV_{90}	—	March 3, 2008	Purple Mountain	PMO NEO Survey Program	·	4.7 km	MPC · JPL
309676	2008 ET_{95}	—	March 6, 2008	Mount Lemmon	Mount Lemmon Survey	·	3.4 km	MPC · JPL
309677	2008 EO_{99}	—	March 5, 2008	Catalina	CSS	LIX	5.3 km	MPC · JPL
309678	2008 ER_{103}	—	March 5, 2008	Mount Lemmon	Mount Lemmon Survey	THM	2.9 km	MPC · JPL
309679	2008 EG_{108}	—	March 7, 2008	Mount Lemmon	Mount Lemmon Survey	·	2.9 km	MPC · JPL
309680	2008 EU_{108}	—	March 7, 2008	Mount Lemmon	Mount Lemmon Survey	·	2.3 km	MPC · JPL
309681	2008 ES_{111}	—	March 8, 2008	Kitt Peak	Spacewatch	·	5.2 km	MPC · JPL
309682	2008 ES_{137}	—	March 11, 2008	Kitt Peak	Spacewatch	NYS	1.4 km	MPC · JPL
309683	2008 ET_{147}	—	March 1, 2008	Kitt Peak	Spacewatch	·	1.2 km	MPC · JPL
309684	2008 ET_{148}	—	March 2, 2008	Kitt Peak	Spacewatch	·	3.4 km	MPC · JPL
309685	2008 EK_{153}	—	March 11, 2008	Mount Lemmon	Mount Lemmon Survey	·	4.5 km	MPC · JPL
309686	2008 EF_{167}	—	March 8, 2008	Mount Lemmon	Mount Lemmon Survey	·	2.7 km	MPC · JPL
309687	2008 EZ_{168}	—	March 13, 2008	Socorro	LINEAR	·	3.0 km	MPC · JPL
309688	2008 FD_{3}	—	March 25, 2008	Kitt Peak	Spacewatch	·	2.2 km	MPC · JPL
309689	2008 FB_{4}	—	March 25, 2008	Kitt Peak	Spacewatch	·	1.9 km	MPC · JPL
309690	2008 FT_{13}	—	March 26, 2008	Mount Lemmon	Mount Lemmon Survey	·	3.3 km	MPC · JPL
309691	2008 FO_{15}	—	March 26, 2008	Kitt Peak	Spacewatch	·	4.3 km	MPC · JPL
309692	2008 FE_{19}	—	March 27, 2008	Mount Lemmon	Mount Lemmon Survey	·	3.3 km	MPC · JPL
309693	2008 FU_{35}	—	March 28, 2008	Mount Lemmon	Mount Lemmon Survey	CYB	4.8 km	MPC · JPL
309694	2008 FJ_{45}	—	March 28, 2008	Mount Lemmon	Mount Lemmon Survey	·	3.7 km	MPC · JPL
309695	2008 FZ_{51}	—	March 28, 2008	Mount Lemmon	Mount Lemmon Survey	THM	2.8 km	MPC · JPL
309696	2008 FA_{65}	—	March 28, 2008	Kitt Peak	Spacewatch	·	4.0 km	MPC · JPL
309697	2008 FM_{79}	—	March 27, 2008	Mount Lemmon	Mount Lemmon Survey	·	2.3 km	MPC · JPL
309698	2008 FS_{87}	—	March 28, 2008	Mount Lemmon	Mount Lemmon Survey	·	1.7 km	MPC · JPL
309699	2008 FG_{91}	—	March 29, 2008	Mount Lemmon	Mount Lemmon Survey	·	2.5 km	MPC · JPL
309700	2008 FP_{98}	—	March 30, 2008	Catalina	CSS	·	3.8 km	MPC · JPL

== 309701–309800 ==
back to top

Designation			Discovery			Properties		Ref
Permanent	Provisional	Named after	Date	Site	Discoverer(s)	Category	Diam.	Ref
309701	2008 FX_{99}	—	March 30, 2008	Kitt Peak	Spacewatch	·	3.5 km	MPC · JPL
309702	2008 FN_{115}	—	March 31, 2008	Mount Lemmon	Mount Lemmon Survey	·	2.7 km	MPC · JPL
309703	2008 FM_{118}	—	March 31, 2008	Mount Lemmon	Mount Lemmon Survey	·	2.5 km	MPC · JPL
309704 Baruffetti	2008 FD_{131}	Baruffetti	March 29, 2008	San Marcello	L. Tesi, Fagioli, G.	EOS	2.8 km	MPC · JPL
309705	2008 FR_{137}	—	March 31, 2008	Mount Lemmon	Mount Lemmon Survey	EOS	2.4 km	MPC · JPL
309706 Ávila	2008 GP	Ávila	April 3, 2008	La Cañada	Lacruz, J.	·	7.4 km	MPC · JPL
309707	2008 GC_{1}	—	April 1, 2008	Mount Lemmon	Mount Lemmon Survey	L4	20 km	MPC · JPL
309708	2008 GP_{2}	—	April 5, 2008	Mount Lemmon	Mount Lemmon Survey	THM	2.6 km	MPC · JPL
309709	2008 GE_{3}	—	April 7, 2008	Great Shefford	Birtwhistle, P.	·	4.0 km	MPC · JPL
309710	2008 GQ_{12}	—	April 3, 2008	Mount Lemmon	Mount Lemmon Survey	EOS	2.0 km	MPC · JPL
309711	2008 GV_{29}	—	April 3, 2008	Mount Lemmon	Mount Lemmon Survey	EOS	2.3 km	MPC · JPL
309712	2008 GL_{61}	—	April 5, 2008	Mount Lemmon	Mount Lemmon Survey	·	5.4 km	MPC · JPL
309713	2008 GY_{64}	—	April 6, 2008	Kitt Peak	Spacewatch	VER	2.9 km	MPC · JPL
309714	2008 GF_{111}	—	April 13, 2008	Dauban	Kugel, F.	·	5.4 km	MPC · JPL
309715	2008 GL_{114}	—	April 9, 2008	Mount Lemmon	Mount Lemmon Survey	·	3.0 km	MPC · JPL
309716	2008 GO_{114}	—	April 11, 2008	Kitt Peak	Spacewatch	·	3.9 km	MPC · JPL
309717	2008 GS_{115}	—	April 11, 2008	Catalina	CSS	·	3.0 km	MPC · JPL
309718	2008 GM_{122}	—	April 13, 2008	Kitt Peak	Spacewatch	·	2.8 km	MPC · JPL
309719	2008 GQ_{129}	—	April 3, 2008	Kitt Peak	Spacewatch	slow	2.2 km	MPC · JPL
309720	2008 GP_{136}	—	April 3, 2008	Kitt Peak	Spacewatch	HYG	3.4 km	MPC · JPL
309721	2008 GU_{140}	—	April 11, 2008	Mount Lemmon	Mount Lemmon Survey	·	2.4 km	MPC · JPL
309722	2008 GT_{145}	—	April 11, 2008	Socorro	LINEAR	TIR	3.7 km	MPC · JPL
309723	2008 HJ_{6}	—	April 24, 2008	Kitt Peak	Spacewatch	·	2.5 km	MPC · JPL
309724	2008 HC_{18}	—	April 26, 2008	Kitt Peak	Spacewatch	·	3.2 km	MPC · JPL
309725	2008 HL_{67}	—	April 29, 2008	Mount Lemmon	Mount Lemmon Survey	·	3.2 km	MPC · JPL
309726	2008 HZ_{68}	—	April 30, 2008	Mount Lemmon	Mount Lemmon Survey	·	3.6 km	MPC · JPL
309727	2008 HW_{69}	—	April 30, 2008	Mount Lemmon	Mount Lemmon Survey	·	3.2 km	MPC · JPL
309728	2008 JF	—	May 1, 2008	Catalina	CSS	AMO +1km	920 m	MPC · JPL
309729	2008 JU_{23}	—	May 7, 2008	Kitt Peak	Spacewatch	·	1.7 km	MPC · JPL
309730	2008 KJ_{39}	—	May 30, 2008	Kitt Peak	Spacewatch	·	2.4 km	MPC · JPL
309731	2008 LX_{15}	—	June 10, 2008	Kitt Peak	Spacewatch	·	5.5 km	MPC · JPL
309732	2008 QD_{35}	—	August 30, 2008	Charleston	Astronomical Research Observatory	·	3.8 km	MPC · JPL
309733	2008 RK_{4}	—	September 2, 2008	Kitt Peak	Spacewatch	L4	8.9 km	MPC · JPL
309734	2008 RW_{27}	—	September 1, 2008	Siding Spring	SSS	·	2.0 km	MPC · JPL
309735	2008 RK_{50}	—	September 3, 2008	Kitt Peak	Spacewatch	L4	10 km	MPC · JPL
309736	2008 SV_{200}	—	September 26, 2008	Kitt Peak	Spacewatch	·	1.3 km	MPC · JPL
309737	2008 SJ_{236}	—	September 29, 2008	Kitt Peak	Spacewatch	centaur	18 km	MPC · JPL
309738	2008 TW_{22}	—	October 1, 2008	Catalina	CSS	·	810 m	MPC · JPL
309739	2008 TB_{158}	—	October 5, 2008	La Sagra	OAM	·	1.6 km	MPC · JPL
309740	2008 UK_{2}	—	October 22, 2008	Kitt Peak	Spacewatch	H	690 m	MPC · JPL
309741	2008 UZ_{6}	—	October 22, 2008	Kitt Peak	Spacewatch	centaur	40 km	MPC · JPL
309742	2008 UC_{121}	—	October 22, 2008	Kitt Peak	Spacewatch	PHO	3.3 km	MPC · JPL
309743	2008 UA_{172}	—	October 24, 2008	Kitt Peak	Spacewatch	·	720 m	MPC · JPL
309744	2008 UL_{199}	—	October 31, 2008	Mount Lemmon	Mount Lemmon Survey	H	750 m	MPC · JPL
309745	2008 UE_{268}	—	October 28, 2008	Kitt Peak	Spacewatch	·	1.2 km	MPC · JPL
309746	2008 UC_{294}	—	October 29, 2008	Kitt Peak	Spacewatch	·	1 km	MPC · JPL
309747	2008 UL_{309}	—	October 30, 2008	Catalina	CSS	·	1.4 km	MPC · JPL
309748	2008 UM_{316}	—	October 30, 2008	Kitt Peak	Spacewatch	·	780 m	MPC · JPL
309749	2008 UF_{356}	—	October 22, 2008	Kitt Peak	Spacewatch	·	970 m	MPC · JPL
309750	2008 VR_{2}	—	November 2, 2008	Socorro	LINEAR	MAR	1.5 km	MPC · JPL
309751	2008 VK_{4}	—	November 6, 2008	Socorro	LINEAR	H	890 m	MPC · JPL
309752	2008 VG_{6}	—	November 1, 2008	Catalina	CSS	EUN ·	3.1 km	MPC · JPL
309753	2008 VT_{38}	—	November 2, 2008	Kitt Peak	Spacewatch	·	990 m	MPC · JPL
309754	2008 WS_{72}	—	August 11, 2004	Socorro	LINEAR	·	830 m	MPC · JPL
309755	2008 WN_{87}	—	August 12, 1997	Kitt Peak	Spacewatch	·	2.1 km	MPC · JPL
309756	2008 WO_{121}	—	November 29, 2008	Bergisch Gladbach	W. Bickel	·	4.2 km	MPC · JPL
309757	2008 WN_{129}	—	November 23, 2008	Mount Lemmon	Mount Lemmon Survey	·	710 m	MPC · JPL
309758	2008 XW_{47}	—	December 4, 2008	Mount Lemmon	Mount Lemmon Survey	·	710 m	MPC · JPL
309759	2008 XR_{49}	—	December 4, 2008	Mount Lemmon	Mount Lemmon Survey	·	1.6 km	MPC · JPL
309760	2008 XF_{56}	—	December 3, 2008	Mount Lemmon	Mount Lemmon Survey	·	3.0 km	MPC · JPL
309761	2008 YQ_{4}	—	December 22, 2008	Dauban	Kugel, F.	V	710 m	MPC · JPL
309762	2008 YN_{5}	—	December 22, 2008	Vallemare Borbona	V. S. Casulli	·	860 m	MPC · JPL
309763	2008 YJ_{15}	—	December 21, 2008	Catalina	CSS	·	980 m	MPC · JPL
309764	2008 YM_{35}	—	December 22, 2008	Kitt Peak	Spacewatch	·	750 m	MPC · JPL
309765	2008 YN_{54}	—	December 29, 2008	Mount Lemmon	Mount Lemmon Survey	V	720 m	MPC · JPL
309766	2008 YR_{54}	—	December 29, 2008	Mount Lemmon	Mount Lemmon Survey	·	950 m	MPC · JPL
309767	2008 YU_{64}	—	December 30, 2008	Mount Lemmon	Mount Lemmon Survey	·	610 m	MPC · JPL
309768	2008 YQ_{65}	—	December 30, 2008	Mount Lemmon	Mount Lemmon Survey	·	900 m	MPC · JPL
309769	2008 YL_{68}	—	December 30, 2008	Mount Lemmon	Mount Lemmon Survey	·	1.3 km	MPC · JPL
309770	2008 YG_{80}	—	December 30, 2008	Mount Lemmon	Mount Lemmon Survey	·	870 m	MPC · JPL
309771	2008 YU_{80}	—	December 30, 2008	Kitt Peak	Spacewatch	·	1.2 km	MPC · JPL
309772	2008 YD_{98}	—	December 29, 2008	Mount Lemmon	Mount Lemmon Survey	·	2.2 km	MPC · JPL
309773	2008 YC_{99}	—	December 29, 2008	Kitt Peak	Spacewatch	·	1.8 km	MPC · JPL
309774	2008 YH_{119}	—	December 29, 2008	Kitt Peak	Spacewatch	V	880 m	MPC · JPL
309775	2008 YD_{125}	—	December 30, 2008	Kitt Peak	Spacewatch	·	1.2 km	MPC · JPL
309776	2008 YH_{125}	—	December 30, 2008	Kitt Peak	Spacewatch	V	940 m	MPC · JPL
309777	2008 YN_{133}	—	December 29, 2008	Kitt Peak	Spacewatch	·	1.8 km	MPC · JPL
309778	2008 YG_{139}	—	November 11, 2004	Kitt Peak	Spacewatch	·	1.1 km	MPC · JPL
309779	2008 YN_{140}	—	December 30, 2008	Mount Lemmon	Mount Lemmon Survey	·	980 m	MPC · JPL
309780	2008 YU_{140}	—	December 30, 2008	Mount Lemmon	Mount Lemmon Survey	·	750 m	MPC · JPL
309781	2008 YC_{154}	—	December 21, 2008	Kitt Peak	Spacewatch	·	580 m	MPC · JPL
309782	2008 YY_{154}	—	December 22, 2008	Mount Lemmon	Mount Lemmon Survey	·	640 m	MPC · JPL
309783	2008 YN_{159}	—	December 31, 2008	Mount Lemmon	Mount Lemmon Survey	NYS	1.4 km	MPC · JPL
309784	2008 YD_{161}	—	December 29, 2008	Mount Lemmon	Mount Lemmon Survey	·	750 m	MPC · JPL
309785	2008 YJ_{163}	—	December 30, 2008	Kitt Peak	Spacewatch	·	950 m	MPC · JPL
309786	2008 YM_{165}	—	December 30, 2008	Mount Lemmon	Mount Lemmon Survey	·	1.5 km	MPC · JPL
309787	2008 YB_{166}	—	December 22, 2008	Mount Lemmon	Mount Lemmon Survey	·	670 m	MPC · JPL
309788	2009 AE_{15}	—	January 2, 2009	Mount Lemmon	Mount Lemmon Survey	NYS	1.1 km	MPC · JPL
309789	2009 AL_{22}	—	January 3, 2009	Kitt Peak	Spacewatch	MAS	850 m	MPC · JPL
309790	2009 AS_{28}	—	April 25, 2003	Kitt Peak	Spacewatch	·	920 m	MPC · JPL
309791	2009 AZ_{33}	—	January 15, 2009	Kitt Peak	Spacewatch	NYS	910 m	MPC · JPL
309792	2009 AF_{40}	—	January 15, 2009	Kitt Peak	Spacewatch	·	670 m	MPC · JPL
309793	2009 AG_{47}	—	January 1, 2009	Kitt Peak	Spacewatch	·	830 m	MPC · JPL
309794	2009 AN_{50}	—	January 2, 2009	Mount Lemmon	Mount Lemmon Survey	·	950 m	MPC · JPL
309795	2009 BE_{32}	—	January 16, 2009	Kitt Peak	Spacewatch	MAS	860 m	MPC · JPL
309796	2009 BN_{36}	—	January 16, 2009	Kitt Peak	Spacewatch	·	780 m	MPC · JPL
309797	2009 BN_{38}	—	January 16, 2009	Kitt Peak	Spacewatch	MAS	1 km	MPC · JPL
309798	2009 BL_{40}	—	January 16, 2009	Kitt Peak	Spacewatch	MAS	1.1 km	MPC · JPL
309799	2009 BT_{41}	—	January 16, 2009	Kitt Peak	Spacewatch	·	1.2 km	MPC · JPL
309800	2009 BP_{44}	—	January 16, 2009	Kitt Peak	Spacewatch	MAS	900 m	MPC · JPL

== 309801–309900 ==
back to top

Designation			Discovery			Properties		Ref
Permanent	Provisional	Named after	Date	Site	Discoverer(s)	Category	Diam.	Ref
309801	2009 BO_{48}	—	January 16, 2009	Kitt Peak	Spacewatch	·	1.7 km	MPC · JPL
309802	2009 BH_{65}	—	January 20, 2009	Kitt Peak	Spacewatch	·	1.1 km	MPC · JPL
309803	2009 BL_{70}	—	January 25, 2009	Catalina	CSS	·	1.2 km	MPC · JPL
309804	2009 BN_{77}	—	January 25, 2009	Socorro	LINEAR	·	1.0 km	MPC · JPL
309805	2009 BO_{78}	—	January 30, 2009	Dauban	Kugel, F.	·	940 m	MPC · JPL
309806	2009 BQ_{81}	—	January 28, 2009	Catalina	CSS	·	940 m	MPC · JPL
309807	2009 BP_{85}	—	January 25, 2009	Kitt Peak	Spacewatch	·	1.9 km	MPC · JPL
309808	2009 BY_{85}	—	January 25, 2009	Kitt Peak	Spacewatch	·	800 m	MPC · JPL
309809	2009 BP_{87}	—	January 25, 2009	Kitt Peak	Spacewatch	·	1.1 km	MPC · JPL
309810	2009 BV_{89}	—	January 25, 2009	Kitt Peak	Spacewatch	V	690 m	MPC · JPL
309811	2009 BY_{91}	—	January 25, 2009	Kitt Peak	Spacewatch	(2076)	930 m	MPC · JPL
309812	2009 BT_{94}	—	January 25, 2009	Kitt Peak	Spacewatch	·	780 m	MPC · JPL
309813	2009 BL_{96}	—	January 24, 2009	Purple Mountain	PMO NEO Survey Program	·	1.3 km	MPC · JPL
309814	2009 BE_{98}	—	January 26, 2009	Mount Lemmon	Mount Lemmon Survey	·	930 m	MPC · JPL
309815	2009 BF_{98}	—	January 26, 2009	Mount Lemmon	Mount Lemmon Survey	·	740 m	MPC · JPL
309816	2009 BE_{105}	—	January 25, 2009	Kitt Peak	Spacewatch	·	1.1 km	MPC · JPL
309817	2009 BU_{105}	—	January 25, 2009	Kitt Peak	Spacewatch	·	1.1 km	MPC · JPL
309818	2009 BY_{107}	—	January 29, 2009	Mount Lemmon	Mount Lemmon Survey	·	1.2 km	MPC · JPL
309819	2009 BS_{119}	—	January 30, 2009	Kitt Peak	Spacewatch	·	1.3 km	MPC · JPL
309820	2009 BD_{130}	—	January 31, 2009	Mount Lemmon	Mount Lemmon Survey	·	1.2 km	MPC · JPL
309821	2009 BB_{134}	—	January 29, 2009	Kitt Peak	Spacewatch	·	1.4 km	MPC · JPL
309822	2009 BX_{138}	—	January 29, 2009	Kitt Peak	Spacewatch	·	2.4 km	MPC · JPL
309823	2009 BK_{143}	—	January 30, 2009	Kitt Peak	Spacewatch	NYS	1.3 km	MPC · JPL
309824	2009 BQ_{147}	—	January 30, 2009	Mount Lemmon	Mount Lemmon Survey	·	600 m	MPC · JPL
309825	2009 BM_{157}	—	January 31, 2009	Kitt Peak	Spacewatch	·	1.4 km	MPC · JPL
309826	2009 BO_{157}	—	January 31, 2009	Kitt Peak	Spacewatch	MAS	810 m	MPC · JPL
309827	2009 BG_{158}	—	January 31, 2009	Kitt Peak	Spacewatch	·	1.9 km	MPC · JPL
309828	2009 BU_{158}	—	January 31, 2009	Kitt Peak	Spacewatch	NYS	1.2 km	MPC · JPL
309829	2009 BF_{165}	—	January 31, 2009	Kitt Peak	Spacewatch	·	890 m	MPC · JPL
309830	2009 BY_{172}	—	January 19, 2009	Mount Lemmon	Mount Lemmon Survey	·	1.5 km	MPC · JPL
309831	2009 BW_{174}	—	January 25, 2009	Kitt Peak	Spacewatch	·	1.1 km	MPC · JPL
309832	2009 BM_{177}	—	January 30, 2009	Mount Lemmon	Mount Lemmon Survey	·	1.8 km	MPC · JPL
309833	2009 BM_{182}	—	January 17, 2009	Kitt Peak	Spacewatch	·	670 m	MPC · JPL
309834	2009 BT_{184}	—	January 18, 2009	Socorro	LINEAR	·	750 m	MPC · JPL
309835	2009 BT_{188}	—	January 31, 2009	Mount Lemmon	Mount Lemmon Survey	·	2.3 km	MPC · JPL
309836	2009 CK_{2}	—	April 2, 2006	Kitt Peak	Spacewatch	·	670 m	MPC · JPL
309837	2009 CC_{17}	—	February 1, 2009	Mount Lemmon	Mount Lemmon Survey	·	890 m	MPC · JPL
309838	2009 CG_{20}	—	February 1, 2009	Kitt Peak	Spacewatch	·	630 m	MPC · JPL
309839	2009 CT_{21}	—	February 1, 2009	Kitt Peak	Spacewatch	MAS	860 m	MPC · JPL
309840	2009 CV_{25}	—	February 1, 2009	Kitt Peak	Spacewatch	V	830 m	MPC · JPL
309841	2009 CL_{28}	—	February 1, 2009	Kitt Peak	Spacewatch	MAS	590 m	MPC · JPL
309842	2009 CS_{39}	—	February 15, 2009	Dauban	Kugel, F.	·	1.3 km	MPC · JPL
309843	2009 CV_{39}	—	February 14, 2009	Dauban	Kugel, F.	·	1.0 km	MPC · JPL
309844	2009 CR_{43}	—	February 14, 2009	Kitt Peak	Spacewatch	·	1.4 km	MPC · JPL
309845	2009 CH_{47}	—	February 14, 2009	Kitt Peak	Spacewatch	·	2.1 km	MPC · JPL
309846	2009 CD_{50}	—	February 14, 2009	La Sagra	OAM	·	1.4 km	MPC · JPL
309847	2009 CZ_{59}	—	February 4, 2009	Kitt Peak	Spacewatch	·	1.6 km	MPC · JPL
309848	2009 DT_{3}	—	February 17, 2009	Socorro	LINEAR	·	2.5 km	MPC · JPL
309849	2009 DR_{5}	—	February 20, 2009	Cordell-Lorenz	D. T. Durig	·	2.1 km	MPC · JPL
309850	2009 DU_{6}	—	February 17, 2009	Kitt Peak	Spacewatch	·	1.1 km	MPC · JPL
309851	2009 DB_{17}	—	February 19, 2009	La Sagra	OAM	MAS	1.1 km	MPC · JPL
309852	2009 DS_{31}	—	February 20, 2009	Kitt Peak	Spacewatch	·	1.0 km	MPC · JPL
309853	2009 DX_{32}	—	February 20, 2009	Kitt Peak	Spacewatch	·	1.1 km	MPC · JPL
309854	2009 DF_{35}	—	February 20, 2009	Kitt Peak	Spacewatch	NYS	1.4 km	MPC · JPL
309855	2009 DF_{39}	—	January 20, 2009	Kitt Peak	Spacewatch	·	900 m	MPC · JPL
309856	2009 DX_{40}	—	February 16, 2009	La Sagra	OAM	MAS	770 m	MPC · JPL
309857	2009 DT_{41}	—	February 18, 2009	La Sagra	OAM	(2076)	930 m	MPC · JPL
309858	2009 DT_{46}	—	February 28, 2009	Socorro	LINEAR	·	950 m	MPC · JPL
309859	2009 DM_{54}	—	February 22, 2009	Kitt Peak	Spacewatch	·	1.3 km	MPC · JPL
309860	2009 DJ_{55}	—	February 22, 2009	Kitt Peak	Spacewatch	·	1.1 km	MPC · JPL
309861	2009 DL_{56}	—	February 22, 2009	Kitt Peak	Spacewatch	NYS	1.1 km	MPC · JPL
309862	2009 DE_{64}	—	February 22, 2009	Kitt Peak	Spacewatch	·	2.2 km	MPC · JPL
309863	2009 DC_{66}	—	February 24, 2009	Mount Lemmon	Mount Lemmon Survey	·	1.8 km	MPC · JPL
309864	2009 DP_{72}	—	February 22, 2009	Mount Lemmon	Mount Lemmon Survey	·	1.2 km	MPC · JPL
309865	2009 DY_{72}	—	February 24, 2009	Mount Lemmon	Mount Lemmon Survey	·	1.2 km	MPC · JPL
309866	2009 DK_{74}	—	February 26, 2009	Catalina	CSS	MAS	770 m	MPC · JPL
309867	2009 DE_{80}	—	February 21, 2009	Kitt Peak	Spacewatch	·	1.1 km	MPC · JPL
309868	2009 DU_{80}	—	February 22, 2009	Kitt Peak	Spacewatch	MAS	650 m	MPC · JPL
309869	2009 DB_{89}	—	February 24, 2009	Mount Lemmon	Mount Lemmon Survey	·	1.4 km	MPC · JPL
309870	2009 DR_{92}	—	February 28, 2009	Kitt Peak	Spacewatch	MAS	920 m	MPC · JPL
309871	2009 DY_{94}	—	February 28, 2009	Kitt Peak	Spacewatch	·	1.5 km	MPC · JPL
309872	2009 DB_{95}	—	February 28, 2009	Kitt Peak	Spacewatch	AGN	1.7 km	MPC · JPL
309873	2009 DY_{95}	—	February 25, 2009	Catalina	CSS	·	960 m	MPC · JPL
309874	2009 DH_{104}	—	February 26, 2009	Kitt Peak	Spacewatch	·	1.1 km	MPC · JPL
309875	2009 DJ_{105}	—	February 26, 2009	Kitt Peak	Spacewatch	NYS	830 m	MPC · JPL
309876	2009 DL_{116}	—	February 27, 2009	Kitt Peak	Spacewatch	·	1.6 km	MPC · JPL
309877	2009 DH_{118}	—	February 27, 2009	Kitt Peak	Spacewatch	·	2.1 km	MPC · JPL
309878	2009 DP_{121}	—	February 27, 2009	Kitt Peak	Spacewatch	·	1.1 km	MPC · JPL
309879	2009 DR_{121}	—	February 27, 2009	Kitt Peak	Spacewatch	·	2.8 km	MPC · JPL
309880	2009 DD_{123}	—	February 28, 2009	Kitt Peak	Spacewatch	·	1.1 km	MPC · JPL
309881	2009 DC_{124}	—	February 19, 2009	Kitt Peak	Spacewatch	·	1.4 km	MPC · JPL
309882	2009 DV_{127}	—	February 20, 2009	Kitt Peak	Spacewatch	NYS	1.0 km	MPC · JPL
309883	2009 DJ_{128}	—	February 21, 2009	Kitt Peak	Spacewatch	·	1.2 km	MPC · JPL
309884	2009 DE_{129}	—	February 26, 2009	Kitt Peak	Spacewatch	·	4.3 km	MPC · JPL
309885	2009 DB_{131}	—	February 27, 2009	Catalina	CSS	·	1.8 km	MPC · JPL
309886	2009 DA_{132}	—	February 20, 2009	Kitt Peak	Spacewatch	·	1.7 km	MPC · JPL
309887	2009 DT_{133}	—	February 28, 2009	Kitt Peak	Spacewatch	·	1.1 km	MPC · JPL
309888	2009 DU_{133}	—	February 28, 2009	Mount Lemmon	Mount Lemmon Survey	·	1.3 km	MPC · JPL
309889	2009 DH_{138}	—	February 20, 2009	Kitt Peak	Spacewatch	·	1.3 km	MPC · JPL
309890	2009 DA_{139}	—	February 24, 2009	Kitt Peak	Spacewatch	·	4.6 km	MPC · JPL
309891	2009 DR_{139}	—	February 19, 2009	Catalina	CSS	·	1.4 km	MPC · JPL
309892	2009 DF_{140}	—	February 19, 2009	Catalina	CSS	EUN	1.9 km	MPC · JPL
309893	2009 DH_{140}	—	February 20, 2009	Socorro	LINEAR	·	1.3 km	MPC · JPL
309894	2009 DP_{140}	—	February 22, 2009	Kitt Peak	Spacewatch	V	890 m	MPC · JPL
309895	2009 DG_{141}	—	February 20, 2009	Kitt Peak	Spacewatch	·	1.3 km	MPC · JPL
309896	2009 DR_{141}	—	February 26, 2009	Mount Lemmon	Mount Lemmon Survey	AGN	1.2 km	MPC · JPL
309897	2009 EM_{2}	—	March 3, 2009	Great Shefford	Birtwhistle, P.	·	1.7 km	MPC · JPL
309898	2009 EO_{3}	—	March 14, 2009	La Sagra	OAM	·	890 m	MPC · JPL
309899	2009 EK_{4}	—	March 15, 2009	La Sagra	OAM	·	1.3 km	MPC · JPL
309900	2009 EQ_{14}	—	March 15, 2009	Kitt Peak	Spacewatch	·	1.1 km	MPC · JPL

== 309901–310000 ==
back to top

Designation			Discovery			Properties		Ref
Permanent	Provisional	Named after	Date	Site	Discoverer(s)	Category	Diam.	Ref
309901	2009 EV_{19}	—	March 15, 2009	Mount Lemmon	Mount Lemmon Survey	·	1.1 km	MPC · JPL
309902	2009 EF_{21}	—	March 15, 2009	La Sagra	OAM	·	2.7 km	MPC · JPL
309903	2009 EZ_{21}	—	March 15, 2009	La Sagra	OAM	·	2.6 km	MPC · JPL
309904	2009 ER_{24}	—	March 2, 2009	Mount Lemmon	Mount Lemmon Survey	·	2.2 km	MPC · JPL
309905	2009 ET_{25}	—	March 7, 2009	Mount Lemmon	Mount Lemmon Survey	·	1.4 km	MPC · JPL
309906	2009 EL_{27}	—	March 15, 2009	Kitt Peak	Spacewatch	·	1.2 km	MPC · JPL
309907	2009 ET_{28}	—	March 7, 2009	Mount Lemmon	Mount Lemmon Survey	·	2.6 km	MPC · JPL
309908	2009 EA_{29}	—	March 7, 2009	Mount Lemmon	Mount Lemmon Survey	·	800 m	MPC · JPL
309909	2009 EN_{29}	—	March 3, 2009	Kitt Peak	Spacewatch	·	1.0 km	MPC · JPL
309910	2009 EE_{30}	—	March 2, 2009	Mount Lemmon	Mount Lemmon Survey	·	3.0 km	MPC · JPL
309911	2009 FG_{2}	—	March 17, 2009	Taunus	E. Schwab, R. Kling	·	1.4 km	MPC · JPL
309912	2009 FX_{6}	—	March 16, 2009	Kitt Peak	Spacewatch	·	1.3 km	MPC · JPL
309913	2009 FX_{11}	—	March 17, 2009	Kitt Peak	Spacewatch	·	1.3 km	MPC · JPL
309914	2009 FM_{14}	—	March 19, 2009	Celbridge	McDonald, D.	JUN	1.4 km	MPC · JPL
309915	2009 FP_{14}	—	March 20, 2009	Taunus	R. Kling, Zimmer, U.	·	1.3 km	MPC · JPL
309916	2009 FQ_{14}	—	March 20, 2009	Pla D'Arguines	R. Ferrando	V	850 m	MPC · JPL
309917 Sefyani	2009 FS_{14}	Sefyani	March 20, 2009	Vicques	M. Ory	·	2.6 km	MPC · JPL
309918	2009 FF_{16}	—	March 18, 2009	Mount Lemmon	Mount Lemmon Survey	·	870 m	MPC · JPL
309919	2009 FP_{19}	—	March 21, 2009	Dauban	Kugel, F.	·	1.3 km	MPC · JPL
309920	2009 FS_{24}	—	March 21, 2009	La Sagra	OAM	MAS	790 m	MPC · JPL
309921	2009 FX_{24}	—	March 22, 2009	La Sagra	OAM	V	990 m	MPC · JPL
309922	2009 FE_{33}	—	March 21, 2009	Kitt Peak	Spacewatch	·	850 m	MPC · JPL
309923	2009 FT_{34}	—	March 24, 2009	Mount Lemmon	Mount Lemmon Survey	·	1.9 km	MPC · JPL
309924	2009 FU_{34}	—	March 24, 2009	Mount Lemmon	Mount Lemmon Survey	·	1.6 km	MPC · JPL
309925	2009 FN_{35}	—	March 21, 2009	Catalina	CSS	·	1.2 km	MPC · JPL
309926	2009 FJ_{37}	—	March 24, 2009	Mount Lemmon	Mount Lemmon Survey	·	1.2 km	MPC · JPL
309927	2009 FS_{38}	—	March 17, 2009	Kitt Peak	Spacewatch	·	2.3 km	MPC · JPL
309928	2009 FL_{42}	—	March 28, 2009	Kitt Peak	Spacewatch	·	2.5 km	MPC · JPL
309929	2009 FG_{52}	—	March 28, 2009	Mount Lemmon	Mount Lemmon Survey	·	1.9 km	MPC · JPL
309930	2009 FY_{52}	—	March 29, 2009	Kitt Peak	Spacewatch	·	950 m	MPC · JPL
309931	2009 FP_{61}	—	March 29, 2009	Kitt Peak	Spacewatch	MAR	1.4 km	MPC · JPL
309932	2009 FK_{62}	—	March 23, 2009	La Sagra	OAM	·	1.3 km	MPC · JPL
309933	2009 FQ_{62}	—	March 24, 2009	Kitt Peak	Spacewatch	MRX	1.2 km	MPC · JPL
309934	2009 FS_{62}	—	March 24, 2009	Kitt Peak	Spacewatch	·	5.4 km	MPC · JPL
309935	2009 FF_{65}	—	March 18, 2009	Kitt Peak	Spacewatch	·	980 m	MPC · JPL
309936	2009 FA_{66}	—	March 19, 2009	Kitt Peak	Spacewatch	·	1.6 km	MPC · JPL
309937	2009 FB_{67}	—	March 17, 2009	Kitt Peak	Spacewatch	·	1.5 km	MPC · JPL
309938	2009 FC_{71}	—	March 28, 2009	Mount Lemmon	Mount Lemmon Survey	·	2.1 km	MPC · JPL
309939	2009 FM_{72}	—	March 18, 2009	Catalina	CSS	·	2.6 km	MPC · JPL
309940	2009 FN_{72}	—	March 18, 2009	Kitt Peak	Spacewatch	·	2.3 km	MPC · JPL
309941	2009 FG_{73}	—	March 22, 2009	Mount Lemmon	Mount Lemmon Survey	·	1.1 km	MPC · JPL
309942	2009 FM_{73}	—	March 24, 2009	Kitt Peak	Spacewatch	·	1.9 km	MPC · JPL
309943	2009 FO_{73}	—	March 24, 2009	Kitt Peak	Spacewatch	·	1.6 km	MPC · JPL
309944	2009 FX_{74}	—	March 24, 2009	Kitt Peak	Spacewatch	·	2.1 km	MPC · JPL
309945	2009 FJ_{75}	—	March 18, 2009	Catalina	CSS	·	3.1 km	MPC · JPL
309946	2009 FL_{76}	—	March 27, 2009	Siding Spring	SSS	·	4.7 km	MPC · JPL
309947	2009 GD_{1}	—	April 3, 2009	Cerro Burek	Burek, Cerro	·	3.5 km	MPC · JPL
309948	2009 GL_{2}	—	September 14, 2005	Catalina	CSS	·	4.6 km	MPC · JPL
309949	2009 GD_{3}	—	April 14, 2009	Taunus	Karge, S., R. Kling	·	1.8 km	MPC · JPL
309950	2009 GQ_{5}	—	April 1, 2009	Catalina	CSS	EUN	2.0 km	MPC · JPL
309951	2009 HV_{1}	—	April 17, 2009	Catalina	CSS	·	2.6 km	MPC · JPL
309952	2009 HZ_{2}	—	April 16, 2009	Catalina	CSS	·	1.5 km	MPC · JPL
309953	2009 HB_{5}	—	April 17, 2009	Kitt Peak	Spacewatch	·	2.7 km	MPC · JPL
309954	2009 HP_{5}	—	April 17, 2009	Kitt Peak	Spacewatch	·	2.0 km	MPC · JPL
309955	2009 HV_{5}	—	April 17, 2009	Kitt Peak	Spacewatch	(5)	1.1 km	MPC · JPL
309956	2009 HK_{9}	—	April 17, 2009	Mount Lemmon	Mount Lemmon Survey	·	4.3 km	MPC · JPL
309957	2009 HF_{14}	—	April 17, 2009	Catalina	CSS	·	1.6 km	MPC · JPL
309958	2009 HH_{14}	—	April 17, 2009	Catalina	CSS	·	4.0 km	MPC · JPL
309959	2009 HJ_{22}	—	April 17, 2009	Kitt Peak	Spacewatch	·	2.7 km	MPC · JPL
309960	2009 HK_{23}	—	April 17, 2009	Mount Lemmon	Mount Lemmon Survey	·	1.8 km	MPC · JPL
309961	2009 HB_{25}	—	April 17, 2009	Kitt Peak	Spacewatch	·	1.8 km	MPC · JPL
309962	2009 HO_{30}	—	April 19, 2009	Kitt Peak	Spacewatch	·	1.6 km	MPC · JPL
309963	2009 HV_{30}	—	April 19, 2009	Kitt Peak	Spacewatch	WIT	1.2 km	MPC · JPL
309964	2009 HH_{32}	—	April 19, 2009	Kitt Peak	Spacewatch	·	1.6 km	MPC · JPL
309965	2009 HK_{35}	—	April 20, 2009	Kitt Peak	Spacewatch	·	2.6 km	MPC · JPL
309966	2009 HN_{38}	—	April 18, 2009	Kitt Peak	Spacewatch	·	1.9 km	MPC · JPL
309967	2009 HZ_{39}	—	April 19, 2009	Catalina	CSS	EUN	1.5 km	MPC · JPL
309968	2009 HW_{42}	—	March 18, 2009	Kitt Peak	Spacewatch	·	3.7 km	MPC · JPL
309969	2009 HF_{44}	—	April 20, 2009	Kitt Peak	Spacewatch	·	1.7 km	MPC · JPL
309970	2009 HR_{44}	—	April 21, 2009	Socorro	LINEAR	·	1.3 km	MPC · JPL
309971	2009 HW_{48}	—	April 19, 2009	Kitt Peak	Spacewatch	·	1.6 km	MPC · JPL
309972	2009 HH_{49}	—	April 19, 2009	Kitt Peak	Spacewatch	NAE	2.2 km	MPC · JPL
309973	2009 HO_{54}	—	April 20, 2009	Kitt Peak	Spacewatch	(5)	1.6 km	MPC · JPL
309974	2009 HY_{57}	—	April 24, 2009	Mount Lemmon	Mount Lemmon Survey	·	2.0 km	MPC · JPL
309975	2009 HZ_{59}	—	April 22, 2009	Mount Lemmon	Mount Lemmon Survey	AGN	1.3 km	MPC · JPL
309976	2009 HM_{60}	—	April 21, 2009	Socorro	LINEAR	·	2.5 km	MPC · JPL
309977	2009 HO_{61}	—	September 17, 2006	Catalina	CSS	·	2.1 km	MPC · JPL
309978	2009 HG_{64}	—	April 22, 2009	Mount Lemmon	Mount Lemmon Survey	·	1.4 km	MPC · JPL
309979	2009 HU_{71}	—	April 24, 2009	Kitt Peak	Spacewatch	·	2.1 km	MPC · JPL
309980	2009 HX_{71}	—	April 24, 2009	Kitt Peak	Spacewatch	·	4.5 km	MPC · JPL
309981	2009 HJ_{72}	—	April 26, 2009	Catalina	CSS	·	2.8 km	MPC · JPL
309982	2009 HX_{73}	—	April 19, 2009	Catalina	CSS	T_{j} (2.99) · (895)	5.8 km	MPC · JPL
309983	2009 HB_{74}	—	April 20, 2009	Catalina	CSS	·	1.8 km	MPC · JPL
309984	2009 HZ_{82}	—	April 26, 2009	Catalina	CSS	EUN	1.6 km	MPC · JPL
309985	2009 HF_{83}	—	April 27, 2009	Mount Lemmon	Mount Lemmon Survey	·	1.2 km	MPC · JPL
309986	2009 HP_{85}	—	April 29, 2009	Kitt Peak	Spacewatch	·	3.1 km	MPC · JPL
309987	2009 HQ_{85}	—	April 29, 2009	Kitt Peak	Spacewatch	·	2.3 km	MPC · JPL
309988	2009 HC_{87}	—	April 30, 2009	Mount Lemmon	Mount Lemmon Survey	AGN	1.3 km	MPC · JPL
309989	2009 HB_{92}	—	April 29, 2009	Kitt Peak	Spacewatch	·	1.7 km	MPC · JPL
309990	2009 HC_{94}	—	April 4, 2003	Kitt Peak	Spacewatch	·	4.2 km	MPC · JPL
309991	2009 HW_{94}	—	April 29, 2009	Cerro Burek	Burek, Cerro	KOR	1.3 km	MPC · JPL
309992	2009 HQ_{95}	—	April 18, 2009	Kitt Peak	Spacewatch	GEF	1.3 km	MPC · JPL
309993	2009 HY_{95}	—	April 20, 2009	Kitt Peak	Spacewatch	·	2.6 km	MPC · JPL
309994	2009 HV_{97}	—	April 18, 2009	Kitt Peak	Spacewatch	·	1.4 km	MPC · JPL
309995	2009 HD_{100}	—	April 27, 2009	Kitt Peak	Spacewatch	·	1.8 km	MPC · JPL
309996	2009 HF_{100}	—	April 27, 2009	Mount Lemmon	Mount Lemmon Survey	·	1.9 km	MPC · JPL
309997	2009 HK_{101}	—	April 29, 2009	Kitt Peak	Spacewatch	·	1.7 km	MPC · JPL
309998	2009 HO_{101}	—	April 18, 2009	Catalina	CSS	·	3.2 km	MPC · JPL
309999	2009 HO_{103}	—	April 19, 2009	Kitt Peak	Spacewatch	EOS	2.3 km	MPC · JPL
310000	2009 HD_{106}	—	April 21, 2009	Kitt Peak	Spacewatch	·	960 m	MPC · JPL

back to top

== See also ==
- Meanings of minor-planet names: 309001–310000
