= List of minor planets: 307001–308000 =

The following is a partial list of minor planets, running from minor-planet number 307001 through 308000, inclusive. The primary data for this and other partial lists is based on JPL's "Small-Body Orbital Elements" and data available from the Minor Planet Center. Critical list information is also provided by the MPC, unless otherwise specified from Lowell Observatory. A detailed description of the table's columns and additional sources are given on the main page including a complete list of every page in this series, and a statistical break-up on the dynamical classification of minor planets.

Also see the summary list of all named bodies in numerical and alphabetical order, and the corresponding naming citations for the number range of this particular list. New namings may only be added to this list after official publication, as the preannouncement of names is condemned by the Working Group for Small Bodies Nomenclature of the International Astronomical Union.

Near-Earth obj.	MBA (inner)	MBA (outer)	Centaur
Mars-crosser	MBA (middle)	Jupiter trojan	Trans-Neptunian obj.
Unclassified

== 307001–307100 ==
Designation			Discovery			Properties		Ref
Permanent	Provisional	Named after	Date	Site	Discoverer(s)	Category	Diam.	Ref
307001	2001 WN_{86}	—	November 20, 2001	Socorro	LINEAR	EOS	2.5 km	MPC · JPL
307002	2001 WM_{92}	—	November 21, 2001	Socorro	LINEAR	·	3.9 km	MPC · JPL
307003	2001 WJ_{100}	—	November 16, 2001	Kvistaberg	Uppsala-DLR Asteroid Survey	·	1.7 km	MPC · JPL
307004	2001 WT_{100}	—	November 16, 2001	Kitt Peak	Spacewatch	·	1.4 km	MPC · JPL
307005	2001 XP_{1}	—	December 8, 2001	Socorro	LINEAR	T_{j} (2.56) · APO +1km · PHA	840 m	MPC · JPL
307006	2001 XQ_{1}	—	December 8, 2001	Socorro	LINEAR	·	4.2 km	MPC · JPL
307007	2001 XG_{3}	—	December 10, 2001	Nashville	Clingan, R.	·	1.6 km	MPC · JPL
307008	2001 XP_{21}	—	December 9, 2001	Socorro	LINEAR	·	2.9 km	MPC · JPL
307009	2001 XC_{40}	—	December 9, 2001	Socorro	LINEAR	·	2.3 km	MPC · JPL
307010	2001 XC_{47}	—	December 9, 2001	Socorro	LINEAR	·	2.4 km	MPC · JPL
307011	2001 XT_{57}	—	December 10, 2001	Socorro	LINEAR	·	1.7 km	MPC · JPL
307012	2001 XN_{61}	—	December 10, 2001	Socorro	LINEAR	·	2.9 km	MPC · JPL
307013	2001 XY_{61}	—	December 10, 2001	Socorro	LINEAR	·	1.6 km	MPC · JPL
307014	2001 XF_{62}	—	December 10, 2001	Socorro	LINEAR	·	2.0 km	MPC · JPL
307015	2001 XZ_{65}	—	December 10, 2001	Socorro	LINEAR	·	2.2 km	MPC · JPL
307016	2001 XT_{70}	—	December 11, 2001	Socorro	LINEAR	·	1.6 km	MPC · JPL
307017	2001 XB_{75}	—	December 11, 2001	Socorro	LINEAR	·	1.7 km	MPC · JPL
307018	2001 XU_{76}	—	December 11, 2001	Socorro	LINEAR	·	1.5 km	MPC · JPL
307019	2001 XV_{77}	—	December 11, 2001	Socorro	LINEAR	·	1.4 km	MPC · JPL
307020	2001 XF_{78}	—	December 11, 2001	Socorro	LINEAR	EOS	2.2 km	MPC · JPL
307021	2001 XJ_{79}	—	December 11, 2001	Socorro	LINEAR	·	980 m	MPC · JPL
307022	2001 XF_{93}	—	December 10, 2001	Socorro	LINEAR	·	1.3 km	MPC · JPL
307023	2001 XX_{95}	—	December 10, 2001	Socorro	LINEAR	·	710 m	MPC · JPL
307024	2001 XZ_{108}	—	December 10, 2001	Socorro	LINEAR	·	860 m	MPC · JPL
307025	2001 XP_{109}	—	December 11, 2001	Socorro	LINEAR	·	2.2 km	MPC · JPL
307026	2001 XD_{126}	—	December 14, 2001	Socorro	LINEAR	·	1.6 km	MPC · JPL
307027	2001 XL_{129}	—	December 14, 2001	Socorro	LINEAR	·	770 m	MPC · JPL
307028	2001 XT_{131}	—	December 14, 2001	Socorro	LINEAR	EOS	2.6 km	MPC · JPL
307029	2001 XB_{133}	—	December 14, 2001	Socorro	LINEAR	(194)	2.0 km	MPC · JPL
307030	2001 XT_{146}	—	December 14, 2001	Socorro	LINEAR	EOS	2.1 km	MPC · JPL
307031	2001 XL_{159}	—	December 14, 2001	Socorro	LINEAR	·	5.1 km	MPC · JPL
307032	2001 XT_{159}	—	December 14, 2001	Socorro	LINEAR	·	1.1 km	MPC · JPL
307033	2001 XK_{163}	—	December 14, 2001	Socorro	LINEAR	·	900 m	MPC · JPL
307034	2001 XG_{186}	—	December 14, 2001	Socorro	LINEAR	·	2.7 km	MPC · JPL
307035	2001 XU_{206}	—	December 11, 2001	Socorro	LINEAR	·	2.1 km	MPC · JPL
307036	2001 XB_{215}	—	December 13, 2001	Socorro	LINEAR	·	3.3 km	MPC · JPL
307037	2001 XJ_{220}	—	December 15, 2001	Socorro	LINEAR	·	2.0 km	MPC · JPL
307038	2001 XJ_{225}	—	December 15, 2001	Socorro	LINEAR	RAF	1.1 km	MPC · JPL
307039	2001 XU_{236}	—	December 15, 2001	Socorro	LINEAR	·	1.2 km	MPC · JPL
307040	2001 XZ_{240}	—	December 15, 2001	Socorro	LINEAR	·	2.6 km	MPC · JPL
307041	2001 XG_{242}	—	December 14, 2001	Socorro	LINEAR	·	840 m	MPC · JPL
307042	2001 XN_{242}	—	December 14, 2001	Socorro	LINEAR	·	1.2 km	MPC · JPL
307043	2001 XY_{242}	—	December 14, 2001	Socorro	LINEAR	·	2.8 km	MPC · JPL
307044	2001 XA_{243}	—	December 14, 2001	Socorro	LINEAR	·	2.1 km	MPC · JPL
307045	2001 XX_{246}	—	December 15, 2001	Socorro	LINEAR	·	1.2 km	MPC · JPL
307046	2001 YF_{6}	—	December 23, 2001	Kingsnake	J. V. McClusky	·	790 m	MPC · JPL
307047	2001 YF_{20}	—	December 18, 2001	Socorro	LINEAR	·	3.0 km	MPC · JPL
307048	2001 YN_{28}	—	December 18, 2001	Socorro	LINEAR	NYS	1.7 km	MPC · JPL
307049	2001 YS_{29}	—	December 18, 2001	Socorro	LINEAR	·	2.4 km	MPC · JPL
307050	2001 YE_{47}	—	December 18, 2001	Socorro	LINEAR	JUN	1.3 km	MPC · JPL
307051	2001 YD_{49}	—	December 18, 2001	Socorro	LINEAR	·	1.0 km	MPC · JPL
307052	2001 YD_{68}	—	December 18, 2001	Socorro	LINEAR	·	790 m	MPC · JPL
307053	2001 YY_{69}	—	December 18, 2001	Socorro	LINEAR	·	1.9 km	MPC · JPL
307054	2001 YG_{71}	—	December 18, 2001	Socorro	LINEAR	(5)	1.6 km	MPC · JPL
307055	2001 YH_{75}	—	December 18, 2001	Socorro	LINEAR	·	1.5 km	MPC · JPL
307056	2001 YT_{81}	—	December 18, 2001	Socorro	LINEAR	·	2.5 km	MPC · JPL
307057	2001 YN_{83}	—	December 18, 2001	Socorro	LINEAR	·	1.3 km	MPC · JPL
307058	2001 YN_{86}	—	December 18, 2001	Socorro	LINEAR	·	1.0 km	MPC · JPL
307059	2001 YL_{88}	—	December 18, 2001	Socorro	LINEAR	·	2.1 km	MPC · JPL
307060	2001 YH_{95}	—	December 18, 2001	Palomar	NEAT	·	2.3 km	MPC · JPL
307061	2001 YA_{102}	—	December 17, 2001	Socorro	LINEAR	·	1.0 km	MPC · JPL
307062	2001 YH_{131}	—	December 18, 2001	Socorro	LINEAR	·	1.9 km	MPC · JPL
307063	2002 AE_{1}	—	January 2, 2002	Cima Ekar	ADAS	·	2.1 km	MPC · JPL
307064	2002 AR_{5}	—	January 8, 2002	Palomar	NEAT	·	1.0 km	MPC · JPL
307065	2002 AX_{7}	—	January 6, 2002	Kitt Peak	Spacewatch	·	1.9 km	MPC · JPL
307066	2002 AS_{8}	—	January 7, 2002	Kitt Peak	Spacewatch	V	750 m	MPC · JPL
307067	2002 AJ_{10}	—	January 11, 2002	Socorro	LINEAR	·	3.0 km	MPC · JPL
307068	2002 AX_{14}	—	January 12, 2002	Socorro	LINEAR	·	670 m	MPC · JPL
307069	2002 AO_{30}	—	January 9, 2002	Socorro	LINEAR	·	2.3 km	MPC · JPL
307070	2002 AV_{31}	—	January 14, 2002	Socorro	LINEAR	APO	280 m	MPC · JPL
307071	2002 AW_{32}	—	January 11, 2002	Palomar	NEAT	PHO	1.6 km	MPC · JPL
307072	2002 AQ_{33}	—	January 9, 2002	Kitt Peak	Spacewatch	·	2.9 km	MPC · JPL
307073	2002 AE_{45}	—	January 9, 2002	Socorro	LINEAR	EOS	2.5 km	MPC · JPL
307074	2002 AH_{49}	—	January 9, 2002	Socorro	LINEAR	EOS	2.6 km	MPC · JPL
307075	2002 AF_{50}	—	January 9, 2002	Socorro	LINEAR	(5)	1.9 km	MPC · JPL
307076	2002 AM_{52}	—	January 9, 2002	Socorro	LINEAR	·	3.4 km	MPC · JPL
307077	2002 AX_{57}	—	January 9, 2002	Socorro	LINEAR	·	810 m	MPC · JPL
307078	2002 AM_{68}	—	January 12, 2002	Kitt Peak	Spacewatch	(2076)	880 m	MPC · JPL
307079	2002 AN_{77}	—	January 8, 2002	Socorro	LINEAR	·	1 km	MPC · JPL
307080	2002 AJ_{85}	—	January 9, 2002	Socorro	LINEAR	EOS	3.1 km	MPC · JPL
307081	2002 AG_{88}	—	January 9, 2002	Socorro	LINEAR	·	1.6 km	MPC · JPL
307082	2002 AK_{101}	—	January 8, 2002	Socorro	LINEAR	EOS	2.7 km	MPC · JPL
307083	2002 AS_{102}	—	January 8, 2002	Socorro	LINEAR	·	2.2 km	MPC · JPL
307084	2002 AE_{103}	—	January 8, 2002	Socorro	LINEAR	·	1.1 km	MPC · JPL
307085	2002 AF_{123}	—	January 9, 2002	Socorro	LINEAR	·	3.2 km	MPC · JPL
307086	2002 AV_{124}	—	January 9, 2002	Socorro	LINEAR	·	2.1 km	MPC · JPL
307087	2002 AQ_{132}	—	January 8, 2002	Socorro	LINEAR	·	1.0 km	MPC · JPL
307088	2002 AT_{144}	—	January 13, 2002	Socorro	LINEAR	·	1.3 km	MPC · JPL
307089	2002 AP_{161}	—	January 13, 2002	Socorro	LINEAR	·	4.0 km	MPC · JPL
307090	2002 AX_{177}	—	January 14, 2002	Socorro	LINEAR	·	1.5 km	MPC · JPL
307091	2002 AX_{178}	—	January 14, 2002	Socorro	LINEAR	·	1.9 km	MPC · JPL
307092	2002 AW_{179}	—	January 14, 2002	Socorro	LINEAR	·	1.3 km	MPC · JPL
307093	2002 AT_{191}	—	January 12, 2002	Kitt Peak	Spacewatch	·	4.5 km	MPC · JPL
307094	2002 AU_{196}	—	January 13, 2002	Kitt Peak	Spacewatch	NYS	1.3 km	MPC · JPL
307095	2002 AW_{201}	—	January 8, 2002	Socorro	LINEAR	·	2.4 km	MPC · JPL
307096	2002 AG_{203}	—	January 5, 2002	Kitt Peak	Spacewatch	fast	1.5 km	MPC · JPL
307097	2002 BX_{13}	—	January 19, 2002	Socorro	LINEAR	H	520 m	MPC · JPL
307098	2002 BK_{24}	—	January 23, 2002	Socorro	LINEAR	EUN	2.0 km	MPC · JPL
307099	2002 BV_{29}	—	January 21, 2002	Anderson Mesa	LONEOS	·	2.2 km	MPC · JPL
307100	2002 CJ_{7}	—	February 1, 2002	Socorro	LINEAR	PHO	1.2 km	MPC · JPL

== 307101–307200 ==
back to top

Designation			Discovery			Properties		Ref
Permanent	Provisional	Named after	Date	Site	Discoverer(s)	Category	Diam.	Ref
307101	2002 CB_{13}	—	February 8, 2002	Fountain Hills	C. W. Juels, P. R. Holvorcem	·	6.0 km	MPC · JPL
307102	2002 CX_{16}	—	February 6, 2002	Socorro	LINEAR	·	1.4 km	MPC · JPL
307103	2002 CC_{18}	—	February 6, 2002	Socorro	LINEAR	·	940 m	MPC · JPL
307104	2002 CH_{25}	—	February 7, 2002	Kitt Peak	Spacewatch	·	830 m	MPC · JPL
307105	2002 CP_{25}	—	February 8, 2002	Socorro	LINEAR	H	700 m	MPC · JPL
307106	2002 CF_{31}	—	February 6, 2002	Socorro	LINEAR	·	1.5 km	MPC · JPL
307107	2002 CN_{31}	—	February 6, 2002	Socorro	LINEAR	THB	4.2 km	MPC · JPL
307108	2002 CN_{45}	—	February 8, 2002	Kitt Peak	Spacewatch	·	980 m	MPC · JPL
307109	2002 CV_{49}	—	February 3, 2002	Haleakala	NEAT	·	4.0 km	MPC · JPL
307110	2002 CJ_{58}	—	February 9, 2002	Kitt Peak	Spacewatch	·	1.4 km	MPC · JPL
307111	2002 CD_{62}	—	February 6, 2002	Socorro	LINEAR	·	1.7 km	MPC · JPL
307112	2002 CC_{68}	—	February 7, 2002	Socorro	LINEAR	·	870 m	MPC · JPL
307113	2002 CD_{68}	—	February 7, 2002	Socorro	LINEAR	V	810 m	MPC · JPL
307114	2002 CO_{69}	—	February 7, 2002	Socorro	LINEAR	·	3.7 km	MPC · JPL
307115	2002 CC_{79}	—	February 7, 2002	Socorro	LINEAR	·	1.8 km	MPC · JPL
307116	2002 CW_{84}	—	February 7, 2002	Socorro	LINEAR	·	1.1 km	MPC · JPL
307117	2002 CS_{89}	—	February 7, 2002	Socorro	LINEAR	·	1.2 km	MPC · JPL
307118	2002 CW_{93}	—	February 7, 2002	Socorro	LINEAR	·	2.1 km	MPC · JPL
307119	2002 CM_{107}	—	February 7, 2002	Socorro	LINEAR	·	3.7 km	MPC · JPL
307120	2002 CH_{117}	—	February 7, 2002	Bohyunsan	Bohyunsan	·	4.1 km	MPC · JPL
307121	2002 CX_{123}	—	February 7, 2002	Socorro	LINEAR	·	1.9 km	MPC · JPL
307122	2002 CJ_{126}	—	February 7, 2002	Socorro	LINEAR	·	1.4 km	MPC · JPL
307123	2002 CN_{126}	—	February 7, 2002	Socorro	LINEAR	MAR	1.4 km	MPC · JPL
307124	2002 CL_{127}	—	February 7, 2002	Socorro	LINEAR	EOS	2.6 km	MPC · JPL
307125	2002 CZ_{128}	—	February 7, 2002	Socorro	LINEAR	VER	4.6 km	MPC · JPL
307126	2002 CT_{146}	—	February 9, 2002	Socorro	LINEAR	·	1.2 km	MPC · JPL
307127	2002 CZ_{147}	—	February 10, 2002	Socorro	LINEAR	THM	2.3 km	MPC · JPL
307128	2002 CU_{150}	—	February 10, 2002	Socorro	LINEAR	V	910 m	MPC · JPL
307129	2002 CR_{155}	—	February 6, 2002	Socorro	LINEAR	·	4.7 km	MPC · JPL
307130	2002 CL_{157}	—	February 7, 2002	Socorro	LINEAR	·	970 m	MPC · JPL
307131	2002 CR_{160}	—	February 8, 2002	Socorro	LINEAR	·	3.1 km	MPC · JPL
307132	2002 CC_{163}	—	February 8, 2002	Socorro	LINEAR	·	3.3 km	MPC · JPL
307133	2002 CF_{164}	—	February 8, 2002	Socorro	LINEAR	EOS	2.4 km	MPC · JPL
307134	2002 CL_{169}	—	February 8, 2002	Socorro	LINEAR	·	5.7 km	MPC · JPL
307135	2002 CA_{172}	—	February 8, 2002	Socorro	LINEAR	·	1.1 km	MPC · JPL
307136	2002 CJ_{172}	—	February 8, 2002	Socorro	LINEAR	·	1.6 km	MPC · JPL
307137	2002 CV_{175}	—	February 10, 2002	Socorro	LINEAR	·	2.1 km	MPC · JPL
307138	2002 CU_{177}	—	February 10, 2002	Socorro	LINEAR	·	1.9 km	MPC · JPL
307139	2002 CC_{184}	—	February 10, 2002	Socorro	LINEAR	·	2.1 km	MPC · JPL
307140	2002 CL_{188}	—	February 10, 2002	Socorro	LINEAR	·	640 m	MPC · JPL
307141	2002 CW_{188}	—	February 10, 2002	Socorro	LINEAR	·	4.0 km	MPC · JPL
307142	2002 CK_{197}	—	February 10, 2002	Socorro	LINEAR	MAS	750 m	MPC · JPL
307143	2002 CQ_{219}	—	February 10, 2002	Socorro	LINEAR	·	680 m	MPC · JPL
307144	2002 CP_{227}	—	February 6, 2002	Palomar	NEAT	V	850 m	MPC · JPL
307145	2002 CL_{238}	—	February 11, 2002	Socorro	LINEAR	·	2.1 km	MPC · JPL
307146	2002 CF_{242}	—	February 11, 2002	Socorro	LINEAR	·	1.0 km	MPC · JPL
307147	2002 CG_{247}	—	February 15, 2002	Socorro	LINEAR	·	3.0 km	MPC · JPL
307148	2002 CN_{251}	—	February 3, 2002	Anderson Mesa	LONEOS	·	3.1 km	MPC · JPL
307149	2002 CU_{254}	—	February 6, 2002	Anderson Mesa	LONEOS	·	1.0 km	MPC · JPL
307150	2002 CU_{256}	—	February 4, 2002	Palomar	NEAT	EMA	4.7 km	MPC · JPL
307151	2002 CQ_{269}	—	February 7, 2002	Kitt Peak	Spacewatch	VER	3.0 km	MPC · JPL
307152	2002 CZ_{270}	—	February 8, 2002	Kitt Peak	Spacewatch	·	800 m	MPC · JPL
307153	2002 CR_{284}	—	February 9, 2002	Kitt Peak	Spacewatch	·	3.0 km	MPC · JPL
307154	2002 CF_{286}	—	February 10, 2002	Kitt Peak	Spacewatch	·	2.8 km	MPC · JPL
307155	2002 CB_{293}	—	February 11, 2002	Socorro	LINEAR	·	4.0 km	MPC · JPL
307156	2002 CT_{293}	—	February 9, 2002	Palomar	NEAT	·	2.7 km	MPC · JPL
307157	2002 CO_{299}	—	February 12, 2002	Socorro	LINEAR	·	1.3 km	MPC · JPL
307158	2002 CN_{302}	—	February 12, 2002	Socorro	LINEAR	·	2.9 km	MPC · JPL
307159	2002 DM_{2}	—	February 19, 2002	Socorro	LINEAR	H	690 m	MPC · JPL
307160	2002 DR_{2}	—	February 19, 2002	Socorro	LINEAR	T_{j} (2.97)	10 km	MPC · JPL
307161	2002 DY_{3}	—	February 25, 2002	Socorro	LINEAR	AMO	770 m	MPC · JPL
307162	2002 DM_{9}	—	February 19, 2002	Socorro	LINEAR	·	7.4 km	MPC · JPL
307163	2002 DG_{11}	—	February 20, 2002	Socorro	LINEAR	·	730 m	MPC · JPL
307164	2002 DM_{19}	—	February 16, 2002	Palomar	NEAT	EOS	2.7 km	MPC · JPL
307165	2002 EM_{5}	—	March 9, 2002	Socorro	LINEAR	H	670 m	MPC · JPL
307166	2002 EY_{5}	—	March 11, 2002	Črni Vrh	Mikuž, H.	·	1.1 km	MPC · JPL
307167	2002 EZ_{9}	—	March 13, 2002	Socorro	LINEAR	H	690 m	MPC · JPL
307168	2002 EB_{12}	—	March 12, 2002	Desert Eagle	W. K. Y. Yeung	·	1.1 km	MPC · JPL
307169	2002 EN_{16}	—	March 6, 2002	Palomar	NEAT	PHO	1.1 km	MPC · JPL
307170	2002 EE_{28}	—	March 9, 2002	Socorro	LINEAR	·	3.0 km	MPC · JPL
307171	2002 EW_{31}	—	March 9, 2002	Palomar	NEAT	·	4.1 km	MPC · JPL
307172	2002 EC_{34}	—	March 11, 2002	Palomar	NEAT	NYS	1.4 km	MPC · JPL
307173	2002 EY_{41}	—	March 12, 2002	Socorro	LINEAR	V	840 m	MPC · JPL
307174	2002 EK_{47}	—	March 12, 2002	Palomar	NEAT	LIX	5.0 km	MPC · JPL
307175	2002 ES_{49}	—	March 12, 2002	Palomar	NEAT	·	1.0 km	MPC · JPL
307176	2002 EF_{57}	—	March 13, 2002	Socorro	LINEAR	·	860 m	MPC · JPL
307177	2002 ES_{57}	—	March 13, 2002	Socorro	LINEAR	·	1.4 km	MPC · JPL
307178	2002 EL_{64}	—	March 13, 2002	Socorro	LINEAR	·	920 m	MPC · JPL
307179	2002 ER_{65}	—	March 13, 2002	Socorro	LINEAR	·	1.4 km	MPC · JPL
307180	2002 ES_{65}	—	March 13, 2002	Socorro	LINEAR	·	3.1 km	MPC · JPL
307181	2002 EH_{69}	—	March 13, 2002	Socorro	LINEAR	RAF	1.7 km	MPC · JPL
307182	2002 EX_{75}	—	March 14, 2002	Palomar	NEAT	·	4.6 km	MPC · JPL
307183	2002 EM_{85}	—	March 9, 2002	Socorro	LINEAR	·	1.9 km	MPC · JPL
307184	2002 EG_{93}	—	March 12, 2002	Palomar	NEAT	EOS	2.7 km	MPC · JPL
307185	2002 EC_{96}	—	March 15, 2002	Socorro	LINEAR	MAR	1.3 km	MPC · JPL
307186	2002 EQ_{104}	—	March 9, 2002	Socorro	LINEAR	NYS	1.5 km	MPC · JPL
307187	2002 EG_{107}	—	March 9, 2002	Anderson Mesa	LONEOS	·	4.7 km	MPC · JPL
307188	2002 EH_{107}	—	March 9, 2002	Anderson Mesa	LONEOS	·	1.3 km	MPC · JPL
307189	2002 EU_{124}	—	March 12, 2002	Socorro	LINEAR	·	2.3 km	MPC · JPL
307190	2002 EK_{130}	—	March 12, 2002	Anderson Mesa	LONEOS	·	1.6 km	MPC · JPL
307191	2002 ET_{133}	—	March 13, 2002	Palomar	NEAT	·	1.2 km	MPC · JPL
307192	2002 EY_{133}	—	March 13, 2002	Palomar	NEAT	·	890 m	MPC · JPL
307193	2002 EH_{145}	—	March 13, 2002	Palomar	NEAT	THM	2.4 km	MPC · JPL
307194	2002 ES_{147}	—	March 15, 2002	Palomar	NEAT	(2076)	1.2 km	MPC · JPL
307195	2002 EX_{163}	—	October 26, 2005	Kitt Peak	Spacewatch	·	4.2 km	MPC · JPL
307196	2002 FO_{1}	—	March 19, 2002	Fountain Hills	Hills, Fountain	PHO	1.5 km	MPC · JPL
307197	2002 FZ_{1}	—	March 19, 2002	Palomar	NEAT	·	780 m	MPC · JPL
307198	2002 FJ_{3}	—	March 18, 2002	Socorro	LINEAR	·	2.3 km	MPC · JPL
307199	2002 FY_{6}	—	March 30, 2002	Palomar	NEAT	·	2.8 km	MPC · JPL
307200	2002 FT_{9}	—	March 16, 2002	Socorro	LINEAR	·	5.0 km	MPC · JPL

== 307201–307300 ==
back to top

Designation			Discovery			Properties		Ref
Permanent	Provisional	Named after	Date	Site	Discoverer(s)	Category	Diam.	Ref
307201	2002 FO_{12}	—	March 16, 2002	Socorro	LINEAR	·	3.6 km	MPC · JPL
307202	2002 FO_{14}	—	March 16, 2002	Haleakala	NEAT	·	1.2 km	MPC · JPL
307203	2002 FB_{15}	—	March 16, 2002	Haleakala	NEAT	·	1.0 km	MPC · JPL
307204	2002 FC_{16}	—	March 16, 2002	Haleakala	NEAT	LIX	3.9 km	MPC · JPL
307205	2002 FQ_{27}	—	March 20, 2002	Socorro	LINEAR	·	1.6 km	MPC · JPL
307206	2002 FV_{35}	—	March 21, 2002	Socorro	LINEAR	PHO	1.5 km	MPC · JPL
307207	2002 FA_{41}	—	March 21, 2002	Socorro	LINEAR	TIR	4.5 km	MPC · JPL
307208	2002 GZ_{2}	—	April 5, 2002	Palomar	NEAT	PHO	1.1 km	MPC · JPL
307209	2002 GN_{6}	—	April 9, 2002	Socorro	LINEAR	·	2.0 km	MPC · JPL
307210	2002 GT_{7}	—	April 14, 2002	Desert Eagle	W. K. Y. Yeung	·	2.3 km	MPC · JPL
307211	2002 GS_{12}	—	April 14, 2002	Socorro	LINEAR	·	1.1 km	MPC · JPL
307212	2002 GN_{43}	—	April 4, 2002	Palomar	NEAT	·	1.7 km	MPC · JPL
307213	2002 GV_{43}	—	April 4, 2002	Palomar	NEAT	MAS	910 m	MPC · JPL
307214	2002 GK_{47}	—	April 4, 2002	Haleakala	NEAT	·	2.6 km	MPC · JPL
307215	2002 GM_{66}	—	April 8, 2002	Palomar	NEAT	·	1.6 km	MPC · JPL
307216	2002 GR_{71}	—	April 9, 2002	Anderson Mesa	LONEOS	·	1.3 km	MPC · JPL
307217	2002 GC_{73}	—	April 9, 2002	Anderson Mesa	LONEOS	PHO	2.7 km	MPC · JPL
307218	2002 GR_{74}	—	April 9, 2002	Kitt Peak	Spacewatch	·	1.9 km	MPC · JPL
307219	2002 GN_{80}	—	April 10, 2002	Socorro	LINEAR	NYS	1.3 km	MPC · JPL
307220	2002 GH_{85}	—	April 10, 2002	Socorro	LINEAR	·	2.1 km	MPC · JPL
307221	2002 GS_{88}	—	April 10, 2002	Socorro	LINEAR	·	1.7 km	MPC · JPL
307222	2002 GB_{92}	—	April 9, 2002	Kitt Peak	Spacewatch	·	1.3 km	MPC · JPL
307223	2002 GU_{99}	—	April 10, 2002	Socorro	LINEAR	·	2.2 km	MPC · JPL
307224	2002 GZ_{104}	—	April 10, 2002	Socorro	LINEAR	·	3.7 km	MPC · JPL
307225	2002 GX_{108}	—	April 11, 2002	Palomar	NEAT	H	620 m	MPC · JPL
307226	2002 GN_{109}	—	April 11, 2002	Socorro	LINEAR	·	1.4 km	MPC · JPL
307227	2002 GE_{123}	—	April 10, 2002	Socorro	LINEAR	·	980 m	MPC · JPL
307228	2002 GP_{146}	—	April 13, 2002	Palomar	NEAT	·	1.5 km	MPC · JPL
307229	2002 GO_{149}	—	April 14, 2002	Socorro	LINEAR	·	1.2 km	MPC · JPL
307230	2002 GS_{162}	—	April 14, 2002	Palomar	NEAT	NYS	1.0 km	MPC · JPL
307231	2002 GV_{173}	—	April 10, 2002	Socorro	LINEAR	·	1.4 km	MPC · JPL
307232	2002 GS_{185}	—	April 9, 2002	Palomar	NEAT	·	840 m	MPC · JPL
307233	2002 HR_{4}	—	April 16, 2002	Socorro	LINEAR	·	3.3 km	MPC · JPL
307234	2002 HA_{8}	—	April 20, 2002	Palomar	NEAT	PHO	1.0 km	MPC · JPL
307235	2002 HZ_{9}	—	April 17, 2002	Socorro	LINEAR	·	1.6 km	MPC · JPL
307236	2002 JK_{2}	—	May 4, 2002	Socorro	LINEAR	T_{j} (2.99)	6.5 km	MPC · JPL
307237	2002 JR_{6}	—	May 6, 2002	Kitt Peak	Spacewatch	·	1.6 km	MPC · JPL
307238	2002 JO_{29}	—	May 9, 2002	Socorro	LINEAR	·	2.1 km	MPC · JPL
307239	2002 JT_{63}	—	May 9, 2002	Socorro	LINEAR	H	690 m	MPC · JPL
307240	2002 JU_{67}	—	May 9, 2002	Socorro	LINEAR	·	1.7 km	MPC · JPL
307241	2002 JP_{89}	—	May 11, 2002	Socorro	LINEAR	MAS	910 m	MPC · JPL
307242	2002 JF_{92}	—	May 11, 2002	Socorro	LINEAR	NYS	1.5 km	MPC · JPL
307243	2002 JU_{100}	—	May 15, 2002	Nogales	Tenagra II	·	940 m	MPC · JPL
307244	2002 JU_{122}	—	May 6, 2002	Palomar	NEAT	EOS	3.0 km	MPC · JPL
307245	2002 JK_{125}	—	May 7, 2002	Palomar	NEAT	V	1.0 km	MPC · JPL
307246	2002 JU_{126}	—	May 7, 2002	Anderson Mesa	LONEOS	·	1.6 km	MPC · JPL
307247	2002 JO_{150}	—	November 11, 2004	Kitt Peak	Spacewatch	·	2.6 km	MPC · JPL
307248	2002 JP_{150}	—	November 12, 2007	Mount Lemmon	Mount Lemmon Survey	·	1.7 km	MPC · JPL
307249	2002 JC_{151}	—	May 5, 1997	Kitt Peak	Spacewatch	·	3.1 km	MPC · JPL
307250	2002 KW_{8}	—	May 29, 2002	Haleakala	NEAT	H	720 m	MPC · JPL
307251	2002 KW_{14}	—	May 17, 2002	Palomar	C. A. Trujillo, M. E. Brown	cubewano (hot)	161 km	MPC · JPL
307252	2002 LR_{1}	—	June 2, 2002	Palomar	NEAT	·	1.5 km	MPC · JPL
307253	2002 LU_{32}	—	June 3, 2002	Socorro	LINEAR	·	1.8 km	MPC · JPL
307254	2002 LM_{46}	—	June 11, 2002	Socorro	LINEAR	T_{j} (2.98)	8.3 km	MPC · JPL
307255	2002 LS_{55}	—	June 14, 2002	Socorro	LINEAR	·	1.9 km	MPC · JPL
307256	2002 LH_{56}	—	June 15, 2002	Socorro	LINEAR	·	2.2 km	MPC · JPL
307257	2002 LP_{62}	—	June 13, 2002	Palomar	NEAT	·	1.5 km	MPC · JPL
307258	2002 LJ_{64}	—	September 19, 2006	Catalina	CSS	·	1.1 km	MPC · JPL
307259	2002 MN_{1}	—	June 19, 2002	Campo Imperatore	CINEOS	·	3.7 km	MPC · JPL
307260	2002 MW_{2}	—	June 24, 2002	Haleakala	NEAT	·	1.9 km	MPC · JPL
307261 Máni	2002 MS_{4}	Máni	June 18, 2002	Palomar	C. A. Trujillo, M. E. Brown	cubewano (hot)	796 km	MPC · JPL
307262	2002 NN_{22}	—	July 9, 2002	Socorro	LINEAR	·	1.8 km	MPC · JPL
307263	2002 NT_{26}	—	July 9, 2002	Socorro	LINEAR	·	2.5 km	MPC · JPL
307264	2002 NX_{42}	—	July 15, 2002	Palomar	NEAT	·	1.3 km	MPC · JPL
307265	2002 NC_{48}	—	July 14, 2002	Palomar	NEAT	EUN	1.5 km	MPC · JPL
307266	2002 NR_{49}	—	July 14, 2002	Palomar	NEAT	ERI	1.8 km	MPC · JPL
307267	2002 NX_{51}	—	July 14, 2002	Socorro	LINEAR	·	3.6 km	MPC · JPL
307268	2002 NQ_{53}	—	July 14, 2002	Palomar	NEAT	V	910 m	MPC · JPL
307269	2002 NY_{60}	—	July 4, 2002	Palomar	NEAT	·	1.7 km	MPC · JPL
307270	2002 NQ_{63}	—	July 8, 2002	Palomar	NEAT	·	1.6 km	MPC · JPL
307271	2002 NH_{68}	—	July 12, 2002	Palomar	NEAT	ADE	2.8 km	MPC · JPL
307272	2002 NL_{70}	—	July 9, 2002	Palomar	NEAT	·	1.5 km	MPC · JPL
307273	2002 NW_{76}	—	March 11, 2005	Mount Lemmon	Mount Lemmon Survey	·	1.2 km	MPC · JPL
307274	2002 OX_{17}	—	July 18, 2002	Socorro	LINEAR	·	1.6 km	MPC · JPL
307275	2002 OD_{23}	—	July 20, 2002	Palomar	NEAT	PHO	1.9 km	MPC · JPL
307276	2002 PJ_{15}	—	August 6, 2002	Palomar	NEAT	·	1.1 km	MPC · JPL
307277	2002 PW_{23}	—	August 6, 2002	Palomar	NEAT	·	4.6 km	MPC · JPL
307278	2002 PE_{54}	—	August 8, 2002	Palomar	NEAT	·	1.8 km	MPC · JPL
307279	2002 PJ_{55}	—	August 9, 2002	Socorro	LINEAR	·	6.0 km	MPC · JPL
307280	2002 PB_{61}	—	August 11, 2002	Socorro	LINEAR	·	2.3 km	MPC · JPL
307281	2002 PG_{62}	—	August 8, 2002	Palomar	NEAT	·	1.7 km	MPC · JPL
307282	2002 PF_{72}	—	August 12, 2002	Socorro	LINEAR	·	4.8 km	MPC · JPL
307283	2002 PN_{73}	—	August 12, 2002	Socorro	LINEAR	EUN	1.7 km	MPC · JPL
307284	2002 PJ_{81}	—	August 13, 2002	Palomar	NEAT	·	1.5 km	MPC · JPL
307285	2002 PX_{81}	—	August 9, 2002	Socorro	LINEAR	·	2.7 km	MPC · JPL
307286	2002 PA_{96}	—	August 14, 2002	Socorro	LINEAR	T_{j} (2.84) · CYB	5.5 km	MPC · JPL
307287	2002 PK_{99}	—	August 14, 2002	Socorro	LINEAR	(5)	1.8 km	MPC · JPL
307288	2002 PW_{99}	—	August 14, 2002	Socorro	LINEAR	·	1.3 km	MPC · JPL
307289	2002 PK_{102}	—	August 12, 2002	Socorro	LINEAR	·	1.8 km	MPC · JPL
307290	2002 PE_{134}	—	August 14, 2002	Socorro	LINEAR	·	2.1 km	MPC · JPL
307291	2002 PF_{139}	—	August 12, 2002	Socorro	LINEAR	(1547)	1.6 km	MPC · JPL
307292	2002 PM_{167}	—	August 8, 2002	Palomar	NEAT	NAE	3.9 km	MPC · JPL
307293	2002 PK_{174}	—	August 15, 2002	Palomar	NEAT	·	1.7 km	MPC · JPL
307294	2002 PP_{177}	—	August 8, 2002	Palomar	NEAT	·	2.0 km	MPC · JPL
307295	2002 PR_{189}	—	August 8, 2002	Palomar	NEAT	·	1.4 km	MPC · JPL
307296	2002 PO_{197}	—	February 2, 2005	Catalina	CSS	·	2.8 km	MPC · JPL
307297	2002 QF_{3}	—	August 16, 2002	Palomar	NEAT	·	1.4 km	MPC · JPL
307298	2002 QV_{6}	—	August 16, 2002	Socorro	LINEAR	·	1.5 km	MPC · JPL
307299	2002 QJ_{11}	—	August 26, 2002	Palomar	NEAT	(5)	1.4 km	MPC · JPL
307300	2002 QH_{13}	—	August 26, 2002	Palomar	NEAT	·	1.6 km	MPC · JPL

== 307301–307400 ==
back to top

Designation			Discovery			Properties		Ref
Permanent	Provisional	Named after	Date	Site	Discoverer(s)	Category	Diam.	Ref
307301	2002 QG_{20}	—	August 28, 2002	Palomar	NEAT	·	3.0 km	MPC · JPL
307302	2002 QA_{34}	—	August 29, 2002	Palomar	NEAT	·	2.1 km	MPC · JPL
307303	2002 QO_{54}	—	August 29, 2002	Palomar	S. F. Hönig	·	1.1 km	MPC · JPL
307304	2002 QO_{76}	—	August 18, 2002	Palomar	NEAT	·	1.7 km	MPC · JPL
307305	2002 QR_{76}	—	August 24, 2002	Palomar	NEAT	·	6.0 km	MPC · JPL
307306	2002 QP_{77}	—	August 18, 2002	Palomar	NEAT	·	1.5 km	MPC · JPL
307307	2002 QD_{78}	—	August 28, 2002	Palomar	NEAT	GEF	1.7 km	MPC · JPL
307308	2002 QS_{78}	—	August 30, 2002	Palomar	NEAT	·	1.3 km	MPC · JPL
307309	2002 QC_{80}	—	August 29, 2002	Palomar	NEAT	·	1.6 km	MPC · JPL
307310	2002 QF_{82}	—	August 27, 2002	Palomar	NEAT	·	2.5 km	MPC · JPL
307311	2002 QK_{82}	—	August 30, 2002	Palomar	NEAT	·	1.6 km	MPC · JPL
307312	2002 QJ_{84}	—	August 16, 2002	Palomar	NEAT	PHO	1.8 km	MPC · JPL
307313	2002 QQ_{86}	—	August 17, 2002	Palomar	NEAT	(5)	1.2 km	MPC · JPL
307314	2002 QJ_{89}	—	August 27, 2002	Palomar	NEAT	·	810 m	MPC · JPL
307315	2002 QM_{93}	—	August 30, 2002	Palomar	NEAT	·	1.7 km	MPC · JPL
307316	2002 QS_{97}	—	August 18, 2002	Palomar	NEAT	(5)	1.3 km	MPC · JPL
307317	2002 QM_{101}	—	August 30, 2002	Palomar	NEAT	·	1.4 km	MPC · JPL
307318	2002 QK_{103}	—	August 30, 2002	Palomar	NEAT	·	1.5 km	MPC · JPL
307319	2002 QT_{106}	—	August 17, 2002	Palomar	NEAT	·	1.5 km	MPC · JPL
307320	2002 QM_{108}	—	August 17, 2002	Palomar	NEAT	·	1.2 km	MPC · JPL
307321	2002 QA_{123}	—	December 12, 2004	Kitt Peak	Spacewatch	3:2	5.2 km	MPC · JPL
307322	2002 QN_{125}	—	August 20, 2002	Palomar	NEAT	MIS	2.2 km	MPC · JPL
307323	2002 QW_{127}	—	August 29, 2002	Palomar	NEAT	3:2	5.1 km	MPC · JPL
307324	2002 QC_{128}	—	August 29, 2002	Palomar	NEAT	·	1.6 km	MPC · JPL
307325	2002 QJ_{128}	—	August 29, 2002	Palomar	NEAT	·	1.7 km	MPC · JPL
307326	2002 QZ_{128}	—	August 27, 2002	Palomar	NEAT	·	2.2 km	MPC · JPL
307327	2002 QJ_{146}	—	June 18, 2006	Kitt Peak	Spacewatch	·	1.7 km	MPC · JPL
307328	2002 QC_{147}	—	December 18, 2003	Socorro	LINEAR	·	1.5 km	MPC · JPL
307329	2002 RA_{5}	—	September 3, 2002	Palomar	NEAT	·	2.2 km	MPC · JPL
307330	2002 RD_{5}	—	September 3, 2002	Palomar	NEAT	·	1.9 km	MPC · JPL
307331	2002 RW_{8}	—	September 4, 2002	Palomar	NEAT	·	4.6 km	MPC · JPL
307332	2002 RC_{15}	—	September 4, 2002	Anderson Mesa	LONEOS	·	1.9 km	MPC · JPL
307333	2002 RW_{28}	—	September 2, 2002	Palomar	NEAT	EUN	1.2 km	MPC · JPL
307334	2002 RW_{32}	—	September 4, 2002	Anderson Mesa	LONEOS	·	1.4 km	MPC · JPL
307335	2002 RA_{35}	—	September 4, 2002	Anderson Mesa	LONEOS	·	1.8 km	MPC · JPL
307336	2002 RO_{38}	—	September 5, 2002	Anderson Mesa	LONEOS	·	3.3 km	MPC · JPL
307337	2002 RD_{44}	—	September 5, 2002	Socorro	LINEAR	NYS	1.8 km	MPC · JPL
307338	2002 RU_{45}	—	September 5, 2002	Socorro	LINEAR	ADE	2.4 km	MPC · JPL
307339	2002 RB_{53}	—	September 5, 2002	Socorro	LINEAR	·	2.1 km	MPC · JPL
307340	2002 RT_{57}	—	September 5, 2002	Anderson Mesa	LONEOS	·	1.9 km	MPC · JPL
307341	2002 RS_{64}	—	September 5, 2002	Socorro	LINEAR	·	2.9 km	MPC · JPL
307342	2002 RQ_{66}	—	September 3, 2002	Palomar	NEAT	·	2.1 km	MPC · JPL
307343	2002 RC_{113}	—	September 4, 2002	Palomar	NEAT	·	1.5 km	MPC · JPL
307344	2002 RX_{117}	—	September 2, 2002	Kvistaberg	Uppsala-DLR Asteroid Survey	T_{j} (2.99) · EUP	7.6 km	MPC · JPL
307345	2002 RW_{144}	—	September 11, 2002	Palomar	NEAT	NYS	1.2 km	MPC · JPL
307346	2002 RC_{146}	—	September 11, 2002	Palomar	NEAT	·	2.3 km	MPC · JPL
307347	2002 RL_{155}	—	September 11, 2002	Palomar	NEAT	·	1.3 km	MPC · JPL
307348	2002 RS_{155}	—	September 11, 2002	Palomar	NEAT	·	1.5 km	MPC · JPL
307349	2002 RC_{157}	—	September 11, 2002	Palomar	NEAT	·	1.6 km	MPC · JPL
307350	2002 RB_{183}	—	September 11, 2002	Palomar	NEAT	EUN	1.4 km	MPC · JPL
307351	2002 RD_{183}	—	September 11, 2002	Palomar	NEAT	·	1.8 km	MPC · JPL
307352	2002 RP_{183}	—	September 11, 2002	Palomar	NEAT	·	1.6 km	MPC · JPL
307353	2002 RM_{185}	—	September 12, 2002	Palomar	NEAT	·	1.4 km	MPC · JPL
307354	2002 RV_{198}	—	September 13, 2002	Palomar	NEAT	·	1.3 km	MPC · JPL
307355	2002 RL_{203}	—	September 13, 2002	Haleakala	NEAT	·	1.5 km	MPC · JPL
307356	2002 RV_{205}	—	September 14, 2002	Palomar	NEAT	V	920 m	MPC · JPL
307357	2002 RW_{208}	—	September 14, 2002	Goodricke-Pigott	R. A. Tucker	MIS	3.1 km	MPC · JPL
307358	2002 RA_{210}	—	September 15, 2002	Kitt Peak	Spacewatch	·	1.1 km	MPC · JPL
307359	2002 RJ_{212}	—	September 15, 2002	Haleakala	NEAT	·	2.9 km	MPC · JPL
307360	2002 RC_{228}	—	September 14, 2002	Haleakala	NEAT	·	1.8 km	MPC · JPL
307361	2002 RQ_{245}	—	September 1, 2002	Palomar	NEAT	MAS	840 m	MPC · JPL
307362	2002 RN_{247}	—	September 14, 2002	Palomar	NEAT	·	1.8 km	MPC · JPL
307363	2002 RD_{248}	—	August 14, 2002	Socorro	LINEAR	·	1.4 km	MPC · JPL
307364	2002 RW_{253}	—	September 14, 2002	Palomar	NEAT	(17392)	1.4 km	MPC · JPL
307365	2002 RX_{253}	—	September 14, 2002	Palomar	NEAT	·	1.9 km	MPC · JPL
307366	2002 RC_{255}	—	September 14, 2002	Palomar	NEAT	·	1.5 km	MPC · JPL
307367	2002 RK_{255}	—	September 15, 2002	Palomar	NEAT	·	1.8 km	MPC · JPL
307368	2002 RO_{260}	—	September 12, 2002	Palomar	NEAT	·	1.7 km	MPC · JPL
307369	2002 RS_{263}	—	September 13, 2002	Palomar	NEAT	·	1.5 km	MPC · JPL
307370	2002 RU_{273}	—	September 4, 2002	Palomar	NEAT	·	1.2 km	MPC · JPL
307371	2002 RU_{289}	—	February 5, 2000	Catalina	CSS	·	2.4 km	MPC · JPL
307372	2002 ST_{11}	—	September 27, 2002	Palomar	NEAT	V	930 m	MPC · JPL
307373	2002 SA_{16}	—	September 27, 2002	Palomar	NEAT	·	2.1 km	MPC · JPL
307374	2002 SB_{21}	—	September 26, 2002	Palomar	NEAT	·	1.7 km	MPC · JPL
307375	2002 SR_{34}	—	September 29, 2002	Haleakala	NEAT	·	4.7 km	MPC · JPL
307376	2002 SB_{42}	—	September 28, 2002	Palomar	NEAT	·	1.4 km	MPC · JPL
307377	2002 SQ_{45}	—	September 29, 2002	Kitt Peak	Spacewatch	MIS	3.1 km	MPC · JPL
307378	2002 SF_{52}	—	September 17, 2002	Palomar	NEAT	·	1.5 km	MPC · JPL
307379	2002 SU_{53}	—	September 20, 2002	Palomar	NEAT	MAR	1.8 km	MPC · JPL
307380	2002 SP_{54}	—	September 30, 2002	Socorro	LINEAR	·	2.2 km	MPC · JPL
307381	2002 SR_{61}	—	September 17, 2002	Palomar	NEAT	3:2 · SHU	5.5 km	MPC · JPL
307382	2002 SJ_{67}	—	September 16, 2002	Palomar	NEAT	·	1.5 km	MPC · JPL
307383	2002 SK_{68}	—	September 26, 2002	Palomar	NEAT	·	1.5 km	MPC · JPL
307384	2002 SM_{68}	—	September 26, 2002	Palomar	NEAT	·	1.5 km	MPC · JPL
307385	2002 SP_{68}	—	September 26, 2002	Palomar	NEAT	KOR	1.4 km	MPC · JPL
307386	2002 SH_{69}	—	September 26, 2002	Palomar	NEAT	·	2.4 km	MPC · JPL
307387	2002 SR_{74}	—	October 16, 1998	Kitt Peak	Spacewatch	·	2.2 km	MPC · JPL
307388	2002 TS_{2}	—	October 1, 2002	Anderson Mesa	LONEOS	·	1.8 km	MPC · JPL
307389	2002 TY_{10}	—	October 3, 2002	Fountain Hills	C. W. Juels, P. R. Holvorcem	·	3.3 km	MPC · JPL
307390	2002 TT_{21}	—	October 2, 2002	Socorro	LINEAR	·	1.1 km	MPC · JPL
307391	2002 TY_{25}	—	October 2, 2002	Socorro	LINEAR	·	2.3 km	MPC · JPL
307392	2002 TM_{28}	—	October 2, 2002	Socorro	LINEAR	·	1.6 km	MPC · JPL
307393	2002 TL_{37}	—	October 2, 2002	Socorro	LINEAR	·	1.8 km	MPC · JPL
307394	2002 TP_{42}	—	October 2, 2002	Socorro	LINEAR	EUN	1.5 km	MPC · JPL
307395	2002 TC_{67}	—	October 7, 2002	Socorro	LINEAR	·	7.9 km	MPC · JPL
307396	2002 TC_{79}	—	October 1, 2002	Anderson Mesa	LONEOS	·	1.7 km	MPC · JPL
307397	2002 TY_{82}	—	October 2, 2002	Socorro	LINEAR	·	1.7 km	MPC · JPL
307398	2002 TB_{83}	—	October 2, 2002	Socorro	LINEAR	·	2.0 km	MPC · JPL
307399	2002 TU_{83}	—	October 2, 2002	Haleakala	NEAT	·	1.7 km	MPC · JPL
307400	2002 TA_{111}	—	October 2, 2002	Campo Imperatore	CINEOS	·	1.7 km	MPC · JPL

== 307401–307500 ==
back to top

Designation			Discovery			Properties		Ref
Permanent	Provisional	Named after	Date	Site	Discoverer(s)	Category	Diam.	Ref
307401	2002 TH_{124}	—	October 4, 2002	Palomar	NEAT	·	2.1 km	MPC · JPL
307402	2002 TZ_{137}	—	October 4, 2002	Anderson Mesa	LONEOS	·	1.2 km	MPC · JPL
307403	2002 TU_{145}	—	October 3, 2002	Campo Imperatore	CINEOS	·	5.0 km	MPC · JPL
307404	2002 TY_{145}	—	October 4, 2002	Socorro	LINEAR	·	1.1 km	MPC · JPL
307405	2002 TP_{154}	—	October 5, 2002	Palomar	NEAT	·	2.3 km	MPC · JPL
307406	2002 TF_{155}	—	October 5, 2002	Socorro	LINEAR	MAR	1.8 km	MPC · JPL
307407	2002 TP_{159}	—	October 5, 2002	Palomar	NEAT	·	2.5 km	MPC · JPL
307408	2002 TT_{165}	—	October 3, 2002	Palomar	NEAT	·	1.6 km	MPC · JPL
307409	2002 TO_{170}	—	October 3, 2002	Palomar	NEAT	·	2.5 km	MPC · JPL
307410	2002 TT_{174}	—	October 4, 2002	Socorro	LINEAR	·	2.1 km	MPC · JPL
307411	2002 TQ_{177}	—	October 11, 2002	Palomar	NEAT	MAR	1.6 km	MPC · JPL
307412	2002 TR_{184}	—	October 4, 2002	Socorro	LINEAR	·	1.8 km	MPC · JPL
307413	2002 TT_{191}	—	October 5, 2002	Anderson Mesa	LONEOS	EUP	6.3 km	MPC · JPL
307414	2002 TY_{191}	—	October 5, 2002	Anderson Mesa	LONEOS	·	2.3 km	MPC · JPL
307415	2002 TE_{199}	—	October 6, 2002	Socorro	LINEAR	·	2.2 km	MPC · JPL
307416	2002 TZ_{203}	—	October 4, 2002	Socorro	LINEAR	·	1.9 km	MPC · JPL
307417	2002 TW_{220}	—	October 6, 2002	Socorro	LINEAR	MAR	1.4 km	MPC · JPL
307418	2002 TR_{235}	—	October 6, 2002	Socorro	LINEAR	EUN	1.3 km	MPC · JPL
307419	2002 TN_{237}	—	October 6, 2002	Socorro	LINEAR	·	4.6 km	MPC · JPL
307420	2002 TK_{242}	—	October 9, 2002	Anderson Mesa	LONEOS	·	1.4 km	MPC · JPL
307421	2002 TP_{256}	—	October 9, 2002	Socorro	LINEAR	·	1.8 km	MPC · JPL
307422	2002 TE_{259}	—	October 9, 2002	Socorro	LINEAR	JUN	1.4 km	MPC · JPL
307423	2002 TG_{259}	—	October 3, 2002	Socorro	LINEAR	·	4.1 km	MPC · JPL
307424	2002 TA_{266}	—	October 10, 2002	Socorro	LINEAR	·	3.1 km	MPC · JPL
307425	2002 TA_{267}	—	October 10, 2002	Socorro	LINEAR	·	2.1 km	MPC · JPL
307426	2002 TC_{273}	—	October 9, 2002	Socorro	LINEAR	·	1.5 km	MPC · JPL
307427	2002 TP_{273}	—	October 9, 2002	Socorro	LINEAR	·	2.2 km	MPC · JPL
307428	2002 TX_{287}	—	October 10, 2002	Socorro	LINEAR	·	2.6 km	MPC · JPL
307429	2002 TV_{293}	—	October 11, 2002	Palomar	NEAT	·	1.7 km	MPC · JPL
307430	2002 TR_{297}	—	October 11, 2002	Socorro	LINEAR	·	1.8 km	MPC · JPL
307431	2002 TO_{304}	—	October 4, 2002	Apache Point	SDSS	·	2.0 km	MPC · JPL
307432	2002 TD_{306}	—	October 4, 2002	Apache Point	SDSS	V	730 m	MPC · JPL
307433	2002 TO_{319}	—	October 5, 2002	Apache Point	SDSS	·	1.5 km	MPC · JPL
307434	2002 TT_{334}	—	October 5, 2002	Apache Point	SDSS	·	1.0 km	MPC · JPL
307435	2002 TH_{347}	—	October 5, 2002	Apache Point	SDSS	·	2.1 km	MPC · JPL
307436	2002 TW_{349}	—	October 10, 2002	Apache Point	SDSS	·	1.7 km	MPC · JPL
307437	2002 TL_{350}	—	October 10, 2002	Apache Point	SDSS	·	1.4 km	MPC · JPL
307438	2002 TZ_{375}	—	October 5, 2002	Apache Point	SDSS	·	1.0 km	MPC · JPL
307439	2002 UR_{1}	—	October 28, 2002	Nogales	C. W. Juels, P. R. Holvorcem	·	1.3 km	MPC · JPL
307440	2002 UO_{25}	—	October 30, 2002	Haleakala	NEAT	·	2.0 km	MPC · JPL
307441	2002 UQ_{28}	—	October 31, 2002	Socorro	LINEAR	·	7.0 km	MPC · JPL
307442	2002 UZ_{28}	—	October 31, 2002	Socorro	LINEAR	·	2.1 km	MPC · JPL
307443	2002 UJ_{37}	—	October 31, 2002	Anderson Mesa	LONEOS	·	2.1 km	MPC · JPL
307444	2002 UU_{40}	—	October 31, 2002	Socorro	LINEAR	·	3.1 km	MPC · JPL
307445	2002 UF_{41}	—	October 31, 2002	Palomar	NEAT	·	2.1 km	MPC · JPL
307446	2002 UN_{43}	—	October 30, 2002	Kitt Peak	Spacewatch	·	1.8 km	MPC · JPL
307447	2002 UA_{75}	—	October 31, 2002	Palomar	NEAT	PAD	1.9 km	MPC · JPL
307448	2002 UY_{77}	—	October 30, 2002	Palomar	NEAT	ADE	2.1 km	MPC · JPL
307449	2002 UW_{78}	—	January 31, 2009	Mount Lemmon	Mount Lemmon Survey	·	1.9 km	MPC · JPL
307450	2002 VN_{3}	—	November 1, 2002	Palomar	NEAT	·	1.9 km	MPC · JPL
307451	2002 VQ_{3}	—	November 1, 2002	Palomar	NEAT	JUN	1.4 km	MPC · JPL
307452	2002 VU_{14}	—	November 6, 2002	Needville	Needville	·	2.0 km	MPC · JPL
307453	2002 VQ_{30}	—	November 5, 2002	Socorro	LINEAR	·	2.4 km	MPC · JPL
307454	2002 VW_{30}	—	November 5, 2002	Socorro	LINEAR	·	1.4 km	MPC · JPL
307455	2002 VP_{55}	—	November 6, 2002	Socorro	LINEAR	·	1.6 km	MPC · JPL
307456	2002 VN_{58}	—	November 6, 2002	Haleakala	NEAT	·	1.2 km	MPC · JPL
307457	2002 VE_{66}	—	November 7, 2002	Socorro	LINEAR	·	2.2 km	MPC · JPL
307458	2002 VR_{75}	—	November 7, 2002	Socorro	LINEAR	·	2.7 km	MPC · JPL
307459	2002 VB_{81}	—	November 7, 2002	Socorro	LINEAR	·	3.8 km	MPC · JPL
307460	2002 VS_{88}	—	November 11, 2002	Anderson Mesa	LONEOS	·	1.4 km	MPC · JPL
307461	2002 VN_{90}	—	November 2, 2002	Haleakala	NEAT	·	1.2 km	MPC · JPL
307462	2002 VP_{102}	—	November 12, 2002	Socorro	LINEAR	·	2.9 km	MPC · JPL
307463	2002 VU_{130}	—	November 7, 2002	Kitt Peak	M. W. Buie	plutino	253 km	MPC · JPL
307464	2002 WL	—	November 20, 2002	Palomar	NEAT	T_{j} (2.9) · CYB	6.8 km	MPC · JPL
307465	2002 WW_{2}	—	November 23, 2002	Kingsnake	J. V. McClusky	·	3.0 km	MPC · JPL
307466	2002 WJ_{18}	—	November 30, 2002	Socorro	LINEAR	·	2.4 km	MPC · JPL
307467	2002 WD_{21}	—	November 24, 2002	Palomar	NEAT	·	2.0 km	MPC · JPL
307468	2002 WV_{21}	—	November 23, 2002	Palomar	NEAT	·	2.7 km	MPC · JPL
307469	2002 WP_{26}	—	November 24, 2002	Palomar	NEAT	PAD	3.1 km	MPC · JPL
307470	2002 WL_{30}	—	November 24, 2002	Palomar	NEAT	·	2.6 km	MPC · JPL
307471	2002 XB_{5}	—	December 1, 2002	Socorro	LINEAR	·	3.0 km	MPC · JPL
307472	2002 XB_{8}	—	December 2, 2002	Socorro	LINEAR	ADE	3.7 km	MPC · JPL
307473	2002 XV_{11}	—	December 3, 2002	Palomar	NEAT	·	2.0 km	MPC · JPL
307474	2002 XD_{16}	—	December 3, 2002	Palomar	NEAT	·	2.5 km	MPC · JPL
307475	2002 XZ_{19}	—	December 2, 2002	Socorro	LINEAR	·	2.3 km	MPC · JPL
307476	2002 XU_{22}	—	December 3, 2002	Palomar	NEAT	·	1.7 km	MPC · JPL
307477	2002 XQ_{26}	—	December 3, 2002	Palomar	NEAT	JUN	1.8 km	MPC · JPL
307478	2002 XR_{31}	—	December 6, 2002	Socorro	LINEAR	(194)	3.3 km	MPC · JPL
307479	2002 XR_{37}	—	December 8, 2002	Palomar	NEAT	·	2.2 km	MPC · JPL
307480	2002 XU_{37}	—	December 5, 2002	Socorro	LINEAR	·	1.2 km	MPC · JPL
307481	2002 XG_{38}	—	December 6, 2002	Socorro	LINEAR	·	3.3 km	MPC · JPL
307482	2002 XP_{46}	—	December 7, 2002	Socorro	LINEAR	·	2.2 km	MPC · JPL
307483	2002 XL_{50}	—	December 10, 2002	Socorro	LINEAR	NEM	2.9 km	MPC · JPL
307484	2002 XL_{55}	—	December 10, 2002	Palomar	NEAT	·	1.6 km	MPC · JPL
307485	2002 XM_{57}	—	December 10, 2002	Palomar	NEAT	·	1.3 km	MPC · JPL
307486	2002 XW_{59}	—	December 10, 2002	Socorro	LINEAR	H	710 m	MPC · JPL
307487	2002 XF_{60}	—	December 10, 2002	Socorro	LINEAR	·	2.9 km	MPC · JPL
307488	2002 XL_{62}	—	December 11, 2002	Socorro	LINEAR	·	1.9 km	MPC · JPL
307489	2002 XZ_{64}	—	December 11, 2002	Socorro	LINEAR	·	1.9 km	MPC · JPL
307490	2002 XU_{79}	—	December 11, 2002	Socorro	LINEAR	·	2.7 km	MPC · JPL
307491	2002 XR_{81}	—	December 11, 2002	Socorro	LINEAR	·	1.8 km	MPC · JPL
307492	2002 XE_{88}	—	December 12, 2002	Palomar	NEAT	EUN	2.2 km	MPC · JPL
307493	2002 XP_{90}	—	December 14, 2002	Socorro	LINEAR	APO +1km	1.7 km	MPC · JPL
307494	2002 XD_{93}	—	December 5, 2002	Socorro	LINEAR	·	2.6 km	MPC · JPL
307495	2002 XV_{95}	—	December 5, 2002	Socorro	LINEAR	·	2.0 km	MPC · JPL
307496	2002 XC_{96}	—	December 5, 2002	Socorro	LINEAR	·	2.5 km	MPC · JPL
307497	2002 XU_{108}	—	December 6, 2002	Socorro	LINEAR	ADE	4.9 km	MPC · JPL
307498	2002 XD_{109}	—	December 6, 2002	Socorro	LINEAR	EUN	1.6 km	MPC · JPL
307499	2002 XD_{117}	—	December 10, 2002	Palomar	NEAT	(12739)	2.0 km	MPC · JPL
307500	2002 XN_{118}	—	December 3, 2002	Palomar	NEAT	·	1.8 km	MPC · JPL

== 307501–307600 ==
back to top

Designation			Discovery			Properties		Ref
Permanent	Provisional	Named after	Date	Site	Discoverer(s)	Category	Diam.	Ref
307501	2002 YB_{1}	—	December 27, 2002	Anderson Mesa	LONEOS	·	2.5 km	MPC · JPL
307502	2002 YF_{6}	—	December 28, 2002	Kitt Peak	Spacewatch	·	1.5 km	MPC · JPL
307503	2002 YL_{8}	—	December 31, 2002	Socorro	LINEAR	·	2.1 km	MPC · JPL
307504	2002 YC_{9}	—	December 31, 2002	Socorro	LINEAR	ADE	3.4 km	MPC · JPL
307505	2002 YX_{11}	—	December 31, 2002	Socorro	LINEAR	·	1.4 km	MPC · JPL
307506	2002 YF_{15}	—	December 31, 2002	Eskridge	G. Hug	·	1.7 km	MPC · JPL
307507	2002 YD_{19}	—	December 31, 2002	Socorro	LINEAR	AEO	1.8 km	MPC · JPL
307508	2002 YX_{19}	—	December 31, 2002	Socorro	LINEAR	·	2.9 km	MPC · JPL
307509	2003 AR	—	January 1, 2003	Socorro	LINEAR	AEO	1.5 km	MPC · JPL
307510	2003 AB_{6}	—	January 1, 2003	Socorro	LINEAR	·	2.9 km	MPC · JPL
307511	2003 AG_{6}	—	January 1, 2003	Socorro	LINEAR	·	1.4 km	MPC · JPL
307512	2003 AD_{13}	—	January 1, 2003	Socorro	LINEAR	·	4.1 km	MPC · JPL
307513	2003 AU_{21}	—	January 5, 2003	Socorro	LINEAR	·	4.6 km	MPC · JPL
307514	2003 AO_{31}	—	January 5, 2003	Socorro	LINEAR	·	4.1 km	MPC · JPL
307515	2003 AN_{32}	—	January 5, 2003	Socorro	LINEAR	·	2.1 km	MPC · JPL
307516	2003 AR_{32}	—	January 5, 2003	Socorro	LINEAR	GEF	1.8 km	MPC · JPL
307517	2003 AH_{43}	—	January 5, 2003	Socorro	LINEAR	·	3.0 km	MPC · JPL
307518	2003 AB_{44}	—	January 5, 2003	Socorro	LINEAR	·	1.7 km	MPC · JPL
307519	2003 AN_{58}	—	January 5, 2003	Socorro	LINEAR	·	3.2 km	MPC · JPL
307520	2003 AY_{60}	—	January 7, 2003	Socorro	LINEAR	·	2.6 km	MPC · JPL
307521	2003 AN_{61}	—	January 7, 2003	Socorro	LINEAR	·	2.4 km	MPC · JPL
307522	2003 AE_{70}	—	January 8, 2003	Socorro	LINEAR	·	1.1 km	MPC · JPL
307523	2003 AV_{72}	—	January 11, 2003	Socorro	LINEAR	·	3.6 km	MPC · JPL
307524	2003 AX_{81}	—	January 13, 2003	Socorro	LINEAR	·	2.6 km	MPC · JPL
307525	2003 AB_{83}	—	January 14, 2003	Socorro	LINEAR	·	2.9 km	MPC · JPL
307526	2003 AB_{88}	—	January 2, 2003	Socorro	LINEAR	·	1.8 km	MPC · JPL
307527	2003 BA_{12}	—	January 26, 2003	Anderson Mesa	LONEOS	·	2.1 km	MPC · JPL
307528	2003 BF_{15}	—	January 26, 2003	Haleakala	NEAT	·	2.1 km	MPC · JPL
307529	2003 BN_{15}	—	January 26, 2003	Palomar	NEAT	·	2.2 km	MPC · JPL
307530	2003 BL_{22}	—	January 25, 2003	Palomar	NEAT	·	4.1 km	MPC · JPL
307531	2003 BK_{37}	—	January 28, 2003	Kitt Peak	Spacewatch	·	4.7 km	MPC · JPL
307532	2003 BO_{50}	—	January 27, 2003	Socorro	LINEAR	EOS	2.5 km	MPC · JPL
307533	2003 BE_{52}	—	January 27, 2003	Socorro	LINEAR	·	1.6 km	MPC · JPL
307534	2003 BN_{67}	—	January 27, 2003	Anderson Mesa	LONEOS	·	2.7 km	MPC · JPL
307535	2003 BQ_{78}	—	January 31, 2003	Socorro	LINEAR	·	2.5 km	MPC · JPL
307536	2003 CV_{3}	—	February 2, 2003	Anderson Mesa	LONEOS	·	4.5 km	MPC · JPL
307537	2003 CO_{4}	—	February 1, 2003	Socorro	LINEAR	·	2.1 km	MPC · JPL
307538	2003 DP_{7}	—	February 22, 2003	Palomar	NEAT	T_{j} (2.95)	4.5 km	MPC · JPL
307539	2003 DU_{9}	—	February 22, 2003	Palomar	NEAT	·	1.6 km	MPC · JPL
307540	2003 DL_{11}	—	February 25, 2003	Haleakala	NEAT	·	2.8 km	MPC · JPL
307541	2003 DH_{15}	—	February 26, 2003	Socorro	LINEAR	(18466)	2.9 km	MPC · JPL
307542	2003 EC_{2}	—	March 5, 2003	Socorro	LINEAR	·	1.5 km	MPC · JPL
307543	2003 EO_{4}	—	March 6, 2003	Socorro	LINEAR	·	2.6 km	MPC · JPL
307544	2003 EJ_{16}	—	March 8, 2003	Anderson Mesa	LONEOS	·	2.3 km	MPC · JPL
307545	2003 EO_{17}	—	March 5, 2003	Socorro	LINEAR	·	3.0 km	MPC · JPL
307546	2003 EM_{20}	—	March 6, 2003	Anderson Mesa	LONEOS	·	2.1 km	MPC · JPL
307547	2003 EN_{23}	—	March 6, 2003	Socorro	LINEAR	·	2.3 km	MPC · JPL
307548	2003 EO_{27}	—	March 6, 2003	Anderson Mesa	LONEOS	·	850 m	MPC · JPL
307549	2003 ET_{27}	—	March 6, 2003	Socorro	LINEAR	·	2.5 km	MPC · JPL
307550	2003 EV_{28}	—	March 6, 2003	Socorro	LINEAR	·	2.3 km	MPC · JPL
307551	2003 EO_{29}	—	March 6, 2003	Socorro	LINEAR	·	1.1 km	MPC · JPL
307552	2003 ED_{37}	—	March 8, 2003	Anderson Mesa	LONEOS	·	2.2 km	MPC · JPL
307553	2003 EJ_{37}	—	March 8, 2003	Anderson Mesa	LONEOS	EUN	1.6 km	MPC · JPL
307554	2003 EC_{41}	—	March 8, 2003	Palomar	NEAT	·	1.9 km	MPC · JPL
307555	2003 EP_{42}	—	March 9, 2003	Kitt Peak	Spacewatch	·	3.5 km	MPC · JPL
307556	2003 EQ_{43}	—	March 10, 2003	Socorro	LINEAR	·	1.9 km	MPC · JPL
307557	2003 EX_{48}	—	March 9, 2003	Socorro	LINEAR	·	850 m	MPC · JPL
307558	2003 EY_{48}	—	March 9, 2003	Socorro	LINEAR	·	1.8 km	MPC · JPL
307559	2003 ES_{49}	—	March 10, 2003	Socorro	LINEAR	·	1.1 km	MPC · JPL
307560	2003 EE_{54}	—	March 12, 2003	Palomar	NEAT	L4	10 km	MPC · JPL
307561	2003 EY_{56}	—	March 9, 2003	Palomar	NEAT	·	1.8 km	MPC · JPL
307562	2003 FX_{1}	—	March 23, 2003	Kleť	J. Tichá, M. Tichý	·	2.3 km	MPC · JPL
307563	2003 FF_{6}	—	March 27, 2003	Campo Imperatore	CINEOS	·	1.1 km	MPC · JPL
307564	2003 FQ_{6}	—	March 26, 2003	Kitt Peak	Spacewatch	AMO	250 m	MPC · JPL
307565	2003 FV_{10}	—	March 23, 2003	Kitt Peak	Spacewatch	·	1.9 km	MPC · JPL
307566	2003 FK_{22}	—	March 25, 2003	Palomar	NEAT	·	1.1 km	MPC · JPL
307567	2003 FB_{25}	—	March 24, 2003	Kitt Peak	Spacewatch	·	810 m	MPC · JPL
307568	2003 FE_{49}	—	March 24, 2003	Kitt Peak	Spacewatch	·	1.0 km	MPC · JPL
307569	2003 FR_{68}	—	February 22, 2002	Palomar	NEAT	L4	10 km	MPC · JPL
307570	2003 FN_{74}	—	March 26, 2003	Palomar	NEAT	·	930 m	MPC · JPL
307571	2003 FA_{92}	—	March 29, 2003	Anderson Mesa	LONEOS	·	2.4 km	MPC · JPL
307572	2003 FX_{101}	—	March 31, 2003	Socorro	LINEAR	·	2.7 km	MPC · JPL
307573	2003 FW_{105}	—	March 26, 2003	Palomar	NEAT	·	1.7 km	MPC · JPL
307574	2003 FD_{108}	—	March 31, 2003	Palomar	NEAT	·	1.9 km	MPC · JPL
307575	2003 FL_{112}	—	March 31, 2003	Kitt Peak	Spacewatch	·	860 m	MPC · JPL
307576	2003 FR_{113}	—	March 31, 2003	Socorro	LINEAR	·	1.1 km	MPC · JPL
307577	2003 FW_{127}	—	March 31, 2003	Catalina	CSS	(194)	4.4 km	MPC · JPL
307578	2003 FC_{133}	—	March 24, 2003	Kitt Peak	Spacewatch	·	1.8 km	MPC · JPL
307579	2003 GD_{9}	—	April 2, 2003	Socorro	LINEAR	·	1.0 km	MPC · JPL
307580	2003 GS_{15}	—	April 4, 2003	Kitt Peak	Spacewatch	·	1.5 km	MPC · JPL
307581	2003 GD_{35}	—	April 8, 2003	Kitt Peak	Spacewatch	EOS	2.4 km	MPC · JPL
307582	2003 GM_{38}	—	April 7, 2003	Kitt Peak	Spacewatch	·	3.7 km	MPC · JPL
307583	2003 GZ_{39}	—	April 8, 2003	Socorro	LINEAR	·	2.5 km	MPC · JPL
307584	2003 HE_{28}	—	April 26, 2003	Haleakala	NEAT	·	1.2 km	MPC · JPL
307585	2003 HA_{49}	—	April 30, 2003	Socorro	LINEAR	·	760 m	MPC · JPL
307586	2003 HJ_{49}	—	April 28, 2003	Socorro	LINEAR	·	1.2 km	MPC · JPL
307587	2003 HR_{49}	—	April 29, 2003	Anderson Mesa	LONEOS	·	690 m	MPC · JPL
307588	2003 HT_{54}	—	April 24, 2003	Haleakala	NEAT	·	2.7 km	MPC · JPL
307589	2003 HY_{57}	—	April 30, 2003	Kitt Peak	Spacewatch	·	4.1 km	MPC · JPL
307590	2003 JX_{12}	—	May 3, 2003	Bergisch Gladbach	W. Bickel	·	3.7 km	MPC · JPL
307591	2003 KD_{3}	—	May 22, 2003	Kitt Peak	Spacewatch	·	4.0 km	MPC · JPL
307592	2003 NX_{1}	—	July 1, 2003	Haleakala	NEAT	PHO	1.6 km	MPC · JPL
307593	2003 NB_{5}	—	July 5, 2003	Reedy Creek	J. Broughton	·	2.1 km	MPC · JPL
307594	2003 OF_{19}	—	July 30, 2003	Palomar	NEAT	EOS	3.2 km	MPC · JPL
307595	2003 OA_{24}	—	July 24, 2003	Palomar	NEAT	V	970 m	MPC · JPL
307596	2003 OC_{24}	—	July 24, 2003	Palomar	NEAT	·	2.2 km	MPC · JPL
307597	2003 OA_{32}	—	July 25, 2003	Socorro	LINEAR	V	970 m	MPC · JPL
307598	2003 PC	—	August 1, 2003	Socorro	LINEAR	·	3.5 km	MPC · JPL
307599	2003 QK_{8}	—	August 20, 2003	Campo Imperatore	CINEOS	·	1.7 km	MPC · JPL
307600	2003 QO_{23}	—	August 20, 2003	Črni Vrh	Mikuž, H.	PHO	1.4 km	MPC · JPL

== 307601–307700 ==
back to top

Designation			Discovery			Properties		Ref
Permanent	Provisional	Named after	Date	Site	Discoverer(s)	Category	Diam.	Ref
307601	2003 QT_{30}	—	August 22, 2003	Socorro	LINEAR	H	670 m	MPC · JPL
307602	2003 QT_{31}	—	August 21, 2003	Palomar	NEAT	NYS	1.6 km	MPC · JPL
307603	2003 QE_{37}	—	August 22, 2003	Palomar	NEAT	·	2.0 km	MPC · JPL
307604	2003 QS_{37}	—	August 22, 2003	Palomar	NEAT	·	1.6 km	MPC · JPL
307605	2003 QY_{51}	—	August 23, 2003	Palomar	NEAT	PHO	4.1 km	MPC · JPL
307606	2003 QS_{52}	—	August 23, 2003	Socorro	LINEAR	·	1.7 km	MPC · JPL
307607	2003 QP_{54}	—	August 23, 2003	Socorro	LINEAR	·	1.6 km	MPC · JPL
307608	2003 QR_{57}	—	August 23, 2003	Palomar	NEAT	·	4.7 km	MPC · JPL
307609	2003 QX_{63}	—	August 23, 2003	Socorro	LINEAR	(1547)	2.5 km	MPC · JPL
307610	2003 QR_{65}	—	August 25, 2003	Palomar	NEAT	·	1.5 km	MPC · JPL
307611	2003 QX_{76}	—	August 24, 2003	Socorro	LINEAR	·	4.6 km	MPC · JPL
307612	2003 QB_{77}	—	August 24, 2003	Socorro	LINEAR	·	5.4 km	MPC · JPL
307613	2003 QB_{80}	—	August 27, 2003	Needville	J. Dellinger	V	740 m	MPC · JPL
307614	2003 QQ_{80}	—	August 22, 2003	Socorro	LINEAR	MAS	750 m	MPC · JPL
307615	2003 QR_{82}	—	August 24, 2003	Cerro Tololo	M. W. Buie	·	1.7 km	MPC · JPL
307616	2003 QW_{90}	—	August 23, 2003	Cerro Tololo	M. W. Buie	cubewano (hot)	401 km	MPC · JPL
307617	2003 QK_{109}	—	August 31, 2003	Socorro	LINEAR	·	1.7 km	MPC · JPL
307618	2003 RC_{22}	—	September 14, 2003	Haleakala	NEAT	·	1.8 km	MPC · JPL
307619	2003 RL_{27}	—	September 6, 2003	Campo Imperatore	CINEOS	·	1.3 km	MPC · JPL
307620	2003 SS_{12}	—	September 16, 2003	Kitt Peak	Spacewatch	·	1.2 km	MPC · JPL
307621	2003 SW_{37}	—	September 16, 2003	Palomar	NEAT	CLA	2.1 km	MPC · JPL
307622	2003 SX_{41}	—	September 17, 2003	Palomar	NEAT	·	2.7 km	MPC · JPL
307623	2003 SL_{47}	—	September 17, 2003	Kvistaberg	Uppsala-DLR Asteroid Survey	·	1.2 km	MPC · JPL
307624	2003 SG_{53}	—	September 19, 2003	Palomar	NEAT	·	940 m	MPC · JPL
307625	2003 SG_{57}	—	September 16, 2003	Kitt Peak	Spacewatch	NYS	1.7 km	MPC · JPL
307626	2003 SS_{76}	—	September 18, 2003	Kleť	Kleť	·	1.7 km	MPC · JPL
307627	2003 SE_{78}	—	September 19, 2003	Kitt Peak	Spacewatch	·	1.8 km	MPC · JPL
307628	2003 SF_{83}	—	September 18, 2003	Kitt Peak	Spacewatch	MAS	950 m	MPC · JPL
307629	2003 SE_{84}	—	September 19, 2003	Haleakala	NEAT	·	1.2 km	MPC · JPL
307630	2003 SO_{85}	—	September 16, 2003	Palomar	NEAT	H	720 m	MPC · JPL
307631	2003 SY_{92}	—	September 18, 2003	Kitt Peak	Spacewatch	·	1.8 km	MPC · JPL
307632	2003 SU_{107}	—	September 20, 2003	Palomar	NEAT	·	2.0 km	MPC · JPL
307633	2003 SH_{110}	—	September 20, 2003	Palomar	NEAT	·	1.5 km	MPC · JPL
307634	2003 SK_{114}	—	September 16, 2003	Kitt Peak	Spacewatch	·	1.6 km	MPC · JPL
307635	2003 SX_{115}	—	September 16, 2003	Palomar	NEAT	·	2.7 km	MPC · JPL
307636	2003 SB_{116}	—	September 16, 2003	Anderson Mesa	LONEOS	·	1.7 km	MPC · JPL
307637	2003 SE_{116}	—	September 16, 2003	Palomar	NEAT	PHO	1.5 km	MPC · JPL
307638	2003 SC_{120}	—	September 17, 2003	Kitt Peak	Spacewatch	·	3.1 km	MPC · JPL
307639	2003 SA_{121}	—	September 17, 2003	Socorro	LINEAR	·	1.1 km	MPC · JPL
307640	2003 SM_{121}	—	September 17, 2003	Kitt Peak	Spacewatch	·	2.0 km	MPC · JPL
307641	2003 SK_{130}	—	September 20, 2003	Socorro	LINEAR	PHO	2.3 km	MPC · JPL
307642	2003 SU_{138}	—	September 20, 2003	Palomar	NEAT	CYB	7.3 km	MPC · JPL
307643	2003 SH_{144}	—	September 19, 2003	Kitt Peak	Spacewatch	·	980 m	MPC · JPL
307644	2003 SH_{148}	—	September 16, 2003	Socorro	LINEAR	·	3.9 km	MPC · JPL
307645	2003 SO_{154}	—	September 19, 2003	Anderson Mesa	LONEOS	(5)	1.2 km	MPC · JPL
307646	2003 SH_{156}	—	September 19, 2003	Anderson Mesa	LONEOS	·	1.4 km	MPC · JPL
307647	2003 SK_{158}	—	September 22, 2003	Kitt Peak	Spacewatch	·	2.7 km	MPC · JPL
307648	2003 SE_{160}	—	September 20, 2003	Campo Imperatore	CINEOS	·	2.0 km	MPC · JPL
307649	2003 SW_{173}	—	September 18, 2003	Socorro	LINEAR	EUN	1.4 km	MPC · JPL
307650	2003 SR_{176}	—	September 18, 2003	Palomar	NEAT	MAS	1.1 km	MPC · JPL
307651	2003 SR_{180}	—	September 19, 2003	Kitt Peak	Spacewatch	·	2.1 km	MPC · JPL
307652	2003 SD_{181}	—	September 20, 2003	Socorro	LINEAR	V	1.0 km	MPC · JPL
307653	2003 SW_{188}	—	September 22, 2003	Anderson Mesa	LONEOS	·	1.5 km	MPC · JPL
307654	2003 SN_{196}	—	September 20, 2003	Palomar	NEAT	·	1.4 km	MPC · JPL
307655	2003 SR_{197}	—	September 21, 2003	Anderson Mesa	LONEOS	·	1.7 km	MPC · JPL
307656	2003 SX_{198}	—	September 21, 2003	Anderson Mesa	LONEOS	·	2.0 km	MPC · JPL
307657	2003 SE_{208}	—	September 23, 2003	Palomar	NEAT	V	910 m	MPC · JPL
307658	2003 SA_{215}	—	September 27, 2003	Socorro	LINEAR	·	3.9 km	MPC · JPL
307659	2003 SG_{216}	—	September 26, 2003	Socorro	LINEAR	·	1.4 km	MPC · JPL
307660	2003 SB_{220}	—	September 28, 2003	Socorro	LINEAR	·	2.5 km	MPC · JPL
307661	2003 SC_{244}	—	September 28, 2003	Kitt Peak	Spacewatch	·	1.6 km	MPC · JPL
307662	2003 SS_{254}	—	September 27, 2003	Kitt Peak	Spacewatch	·	1.4 km	MPC · JPL
307663	2003 SG_{260}	—	September 27, 2003	Socorro	LINEAR	EOS	3.0 km	MPC · JPL
307664	2003 SD_{277}	—	September 30, 2003	Socorro	LINEAR	·	1.2 km	MPC · JPL
307665	2003 SM_{290}	—	September 28, 2003	Kitt Peak	Spacewatch	NYS	1.3 km	MPC · JPL
307666	2003 SP_{294}	—	September 28, 2003	Socorro	LINEAR	(5)	1.2 km	MPC · JPL
307667	2003 SS_{301}	—	September 17, 2003	Palomar	NEAT	·	1.9 km	MPC · JPL
307668	2003 SP_{305}	—	September 17, 2003	Palomar	NEAT	EUN	1.8 km	MPC · JPL
307669	2003 SW_{306}	—	September 30, 2003	Socorro	LINEAR	·	1.2 km	MPC · JPL
307670	2003 SK_{307}	—	September 26, 2003	Socorro	LINEAR	EUN	1.5 km	MPC · JPL
307671	2003 SC_{313}	—	September 17, 2003	Palomar	NEAT	·	1.2 km	MPC · JPL
307672	2003 SD_{315}	—	September 22, 2003	Palomar	NEAT	H	630 m	MPC · JPL
307673	2003 SG_{320}	—	September 17, 2003	Kitt Peak	Spacewatch	·	1.5 km	MPC · JPL
307674	2003 SU_{324}	—	September 17, 2003	Kitt Peak	Spacewatch	·	1.3 km	MPC · JPL
307675	2003 SP_{327}	—	September 19, 2003	Kitt Peak	Spacewatch	·	1.4 km	MPC · JPL
307676	2003 SV_{331}	—	September 27, 2003	Kitt Peak	Spacewatch	·	870 m	MPC · JPL
307677	2003 SA_{333}	—	September 30, 2003	Kitt Peak	Spacewatch	·	1.3 km	MPC · JPL
307678	2003 SR_{333}	—	September 26, 2003	Apache Point	SDSS	NYS ·	1.3 km	MPC · JPL
307679	2003 ST_{352}	—	September 20, 2003	Campo Imperatore	CINEOS	·	1.7 km	MPC · JPL
307680	2003 SG_{355}	—	September 25, 2003	Palomar	NEAT	·	1.3 km	MPC · JPL
307681	2003 SA_{425}	—	September 25, 2003	Mauna Kea	P. A. Wiegert	MAS	730 m	MPC · JPL
307682	2003 TF_{1}	—	October 4, 2003	Kingsnake	J. V. McClusky	·	1.4 km	MPC · JPL
307683	2003 TU_{7}	—	October 1, 2003	Anderson Mesa	LONEOS	H	940 m	MPC · JPL
307684	2003 TD_{11}	—	October 14, 2003	Anderson Mesa	LONEOS	·	1.6 km	MPC · JPL
307685	2003 TF_{49}	—	October 3, 2003	Kitt Peak	Spacewatch	·	1.8 km	MPC · JPL
307686	2003 US_{3}	—	October 16, 2003	Kitt Peak	Spacewatch	·	1.3 km	MPC · JPL
307687	2003 UV_{6}	—	October 18, 2003	Palomar	NEAT	H	520 m	MPC · JPL
307688	2003 UW_{7}	—	October 18, 2003	Kleť	Kleť	·	940 m	MPC · JPL
307689	2003 UG_{8}	—	October 19, 2003	Kitt Peak	Spacewatch	H	480 m	MPC · JPL
307690	2003 UD_{11}	—	October 20, 2003	Kitt Peak	Spacewatch	·	1.2 km	MPC · JPL
307691	2003 UL_{14}	—	October 16, 2003	Anderson Mesa	LONEOS	·	1.5 km	MPC · JPL
307692	2003 UR_{16}	—	October 16, 2003	Kitt Peak	Spacewatch	·	1.8 km	MPC · JPL
307693	2003 UM_{19}	—	October 20, 2003	Kingsnake	J. V. McClusky	·	1.3 km	MPC · JPL
307694	2003 UW_{22}	—	October 19, 2003	Kitt Peak	Spacewatch	·	2.1 km	MPC · JPL
307695	2003 UG_{29}	—	October 23, 2003	Kvistaberg	Uppsala-DLR Asteroid Survey	·	1.4 km	MPC · JPL
307696	2003 UP_{38}	—	October 17, 2003	Kitt Peak	Spacewatch	·	4.7 km	MPC · JPL
307697	2003 US_{39}	—	October 16, 2003	Kitt Peak	Spacewatch	·	1.1 km	MPC · JPL
307698	2003 UU_{44}	—	October 18, 2003	Kitt Peak	Spacewatch	·	1.4 km	MPC · JPL
307699	2003 UP_{53}	—	October 18, 2003	Palomar	NEAT	H	720 m	MPC · JPL
307700	2003 UC_{61}	—	October 16, 2003	Palomar	NEAT	·	2.4 km	MPC · JPL

== 307701–307800 ==
back to top

Designation			Discovery			Properties		Ref
Permanent	Provisional	Named after	Date	Site	Discoverer(s)	Category	Diam.	Ref
307701	2003 UX_{70}	—	October 18, 2003	Kitt Peak	Spacewatch	·	1.2 km	MPC · JPL
307702	2003 UJ_{73}	—	October 19, 2003	Kitt Peak	Spacewatch	·	1.5 km	MPC · JPL
307703	2003 UH_{74}	—	October 16, 2003	Palomar	NEAT	HIL · 3:2	6.4 km	MPC · JPL
307704	2003 UH_{75}	—	October 17, 2003	Anderson Mesa	LONEOS	H	780 m	MPC · JPL
307705	2003 UR_{78}	—	October 18, 2003	Kitt Peak	Spacewatch	·	5.7 km	MPC · JPL
307706	2003 UV_{80}	—	October 16, 2003	Anderson Mesa	LONEOS	·	1.4 km	MPC · JPL
307707	2003 UG_{86}	—	October 18, 2003	Palomar	NEAT	·	1.7 km	MPC · JPL
307708	2003 UN_{92}	—	October 20, 2003	Palomar	NEAT	·	1.7 km	MPC · JPL
307709	2003 UO_{92}	—	October 20, 2003	Palomar	NEAT	·	1.7 km	MPC · JPL
307710	2003 UF_{93}	—	October 17, 2003	Anderson Mesa	LONEOS	·	1.8 km	MPC · JPL
307711	2003 UR_{95}	—	October 18, 2003	Kitt Peak	Spacewatch	MAS	1.0 km	MPC · JPL
307712	2003 UX_{97}	—	October 19, 2003	Kitt Peak	Spacewatch	·	1.0 km	MPC · JPL
307713	2003 UJ_{119}	—	October 18, 2003	Palomar	NEAT	(194)	1.3 km	MPC · JPL
307714	2003 UG_{141}	—	October 18, 2003	Anderson Mesa	LONEOS	·	2.0 km	MPC · JPL
307715	2003 UT_{142}	—	October 18, 2003	Anderson Mesa	LONEOS	EOS	4.1 km	MPC · JPL
307716	2003 UY_{144}	—	October 18, 2003	Anderson Mesa	LONEOS	·	2.0 km	MPC · JPL
307717	2003 UM_{148}	—	October 19, 2003	Anderson Mesa	LONEOS	·	1.4 km	MPC · JPL
307718	2003 UX_{151}	—	October 21, 2003	Kitt Peak	Spacewatch	·	1.7 km	MPC · JPL
307719	2003 UA_{152}	—	October 21, 2003	Kitt Peak	Spacewatch	·	1.8 km	MPC · JPL
307720	2003 UZ_{158}	—	October 20, 2003	Kitt Peak	Spacewatch	·	1.8 km	MPC · JPL
307721	2003 UC_{167}	—	October 22, 2003	Socorro	LINEAR	·	1.9 km	MPC · JPL
307722	2003 UM_{167}	—	October 22, 2003	Socorro	LINEAR	·	4.9 km	MPC · JPL
307723	2003 UX_{170}	—	October 19, 2003	Kitt Peak	Spacewatch	·	1.3 km	MPC · JPL
307724	2003 UZ_{170}	—	October 19, 2003	Kitt Peak	Spacewatch	MAR	1.2 km	MPC · JPL
307725	2003 UT_{172}	—	October 20, 2003	Socorro	LINEAR	·	2.0 km	MPC · JPL
307726	2003 UM_{176}	—	October 21, 2003	Anderson Mesa	LONEOS	·	1.1 km	MPC · JPL
307727	2003 UO_{181}	—	October 21, 2003	Socorro	LINEAR	·	1.3 km	MPC · JPL
307728	2003 UV_{190}	—	October 23, 2003	Anderson Mesa	LONEOS	·	1.1 km	MPC · JPL
307729	2003 UC_{195}	—	October 20, 2003	Kitt Peak	Spacewatch	·	1.1 km	MPC · JPL
307730	2003 UT_{195}	—	October 20, 2003	Kitt Peak	Spacewatch	·	1.8 km	MPC · JPL
307731	2003 US_{196}	—	October 21, 2003	Kitt Peak	Spacewatch	·	800 m	MPC · JPL
307732	2003 UJ_{198}	—	October 21, 2003	Kitt Peak	Spacewatch	·	1.2 km	MPC · JPL
307733	2003 UN_{200}	—	October 21, 2003	Socorro	LINEAR	MAR	1.0 km	MPC · JPL
307734	2003 UW_{201}	—	October 21, 2003	Socorro	LINEAR	(5)	1.3 km	MPC · JPL
307735	2003 UF_{217}	—	October 21, 2003	Socorro	LINEAR	·	1.2 km	MPC · JPL
307736	2003 UC_{227}	—	October 23, 2003	Kitt Peak	Spacewatch	·	1.4 km	MPC · JPL
307737	2003 UH_{228}	—	October 23, 2003	Anderson Mesa	LONEOS	·	1.6 km	MPC · JPL
307738	2003 US_{229}	—	October 23, 2003	Anderson Mesa	LONEOS	·	990 m	MPC · JPL
307739	2003 UW_{232}	—	October 24, 2003	Socorro	LINEAR	·	3.6 km	MPC · JPL
307740	2003 UJ_{234}	—	October 24, 2003	Socorro	LINEAR	·	2.0 km	MPC · JPL
307741	2003 UV_{239}	—	October 24, 2003	Socorro	LINEAR	·	5.0 km	MPC · JPL
307742	2003 UY_{259}	—	October 25, 2003	Socorro	LINEAR	·	1.9 km	MPC · JPL
307743	2003 UG_{264}	—	October 27, 2003	Socorro	LINEAR	(5)	1.4 km	MPC · JPL
307744	2003 UE_{266}	—	October 28, 2003	Socorro	LINEAR	T_{j} (2.98) · 3:2	5.8 km	MPC · JPL
307745	2003 UG_{271}	—	October 17, 2003	Palomar	NEAT	·	2.2 km	MPC · JPL
307746	2003 UR_{277}	—	October 25, 2003	Socorro	LINEAR	·	1.7 km	MPC · JPL
307747	2003 UO_{279}	—	October 27, 2003	Socorro	LINEAR	·	2.1 km	MPC · JPL
307748	2003 UJ_{280}	—	October 27, 2003	Socorro	LINEAR	DOR	4.0 km	MPC · JPL
307749	2003 UX_{308}	—	October 19, 2003	Kitt Peak	Spacewatch	·	1.5 km	MPC · JPL
307750	2003 UT_{316}	—	October 29, 2003	Anderson Mesa	LONEOS	NYS	1.6 km	MPC · JPL
307751	2003 UR_{322}	—	October 16, 2003	Kitt Peak	Spacewatch	·	1.2 km	MPC · JPL
307752	2003 UA_{333}	—	October 18, 2003	Apache Point	SDSS	·	870 m	MPC · JPL
307753	2003 UB_{334}	—	October 18, 2003	Apache Point	SDSS	MAS	690 m	MPC · JPL
307754	2003 UW_{335}	—	October 18, 2003	Apache Point	SDSS	·	1.5 km	MPC · JPL
307755	2003 UF_{357}	—	September 20, 2003	Campo Imperatore	CINEOS	3:2 · SHU	4.3 km	MPC · JPL
307756	2003 UG_{357}	—	October 19, 2003	Kitt Peak	Spacewatch	·	1.6 km	MPC · JPL
307757	2003 UU_{376}	—	October 22, 2003	Apache Point	SDSS	·	1.7 km	MPC · JPL
307758	2003 UD_{391}	—	October 22, 2003	Kitt Peak	M. W. Buie	·	1.4 km	MPC · JPL
307759	2003 UN_{401}	—	October 23, 2003	Apache Point	SDSS	·	1.3 km	MPC · JPL
307760	2003 UY_{401}	—	October 23, 2003	Apache Point	SDSS	·	1.2 km	MPC · JPL
307761 Vérteslászló	2003 VF	Vérteslászló	November 3, 2003	Piszkéstető	K. Sárneczky, Mészáros, S.	·	2.0 km	MPC · JPL
307762	2003 VC_{1}	—	November 5, 2003	Socorro	LINEAR	·	3.4 km	MPC · JPL
307763	2003 VJ_{3}	—	November 15, 2003	Kitt Peak	Spacewatch	·	1.9 km	MPC · JPL
307764	2003 VF_{10}	—	November 15, 2003	Palomar	NEAT	H	720 m	MPC · JPL
307765	2003 VH_{10}	—	November 15, 2003	Palomar	NEAT	·	2.0 km	MPC · JPL
307766	2003 VN_{12}	—	November 4, 2003	Socorro	LINEAR	·	2.0 km	MPC · JPL
307767	2003 WX_{4}	—	November 16, 2003	Kitt Peak	Spacewatch	·	1.5 km	MPC · JPL
307768	2003 WT_{10}	—	November 18, 2003	Kitt Peak	Spacewatch	·	1.3 km	MPC · JPL
307769	2003 WG_{25}	—	November 18, 2003	Kitt Peak	Spacewatch	·	1.8 km	MPC · JPL
307770	2003 WA_{40}	—	November 19, 2003	Kitt Peak	Spacewatch	·	1.4 km	MPC · JPL
307771	2003 WS_{42}	—	November 23, 2003	Catalina	CSS	T_{j} (2.9)	9.1 km	MPC · JPL
307772	2003 WL_{46}	—	November 18, 2003	Palomar	NEAT	·	870 m	MPC · JPL
307773	2003 WW_{50}	—	November 19, 2003	Kitt Peak	Spacewatch	·	840 m	MPC · JPL
307774	2003 WF_{55}	—	November 20, 2003	Socorro	LINEAR	3:2 · SHU	7.9 km	MPC · JPL
307775	2003 WM_{55}	—	November 20, 2003	Socorro	LINEAR	·	1.9 km	MPC · JPL
307776	2003 WZ_{55}	—	November 20, 2003	Socorro	LINEAR	·	1.2 km	MPC · JPL
307777	2003 WX_{57}	—	November 18, 2003	Kitt Peak	Spacewatch	·	1.6 km	MPC · JPL
307778	2003 WY_{63}	—	November 19, 2003	Kitt Peak	Spacewatch	NYS	1.7 km	MPC · JPL
307779	2003 WK_{64}	—	November 19, 2003	Kitt Peak	Spacewatch	·	1.7 km	MPC · JPL
307780	2003 WX_{79}	—	November 20, 2003	Socorro	LINEAR	·	1.0 km	MPC · JPL
307781	2003 WR_{81}	—	November 18, 2003	Palomar	NEAT	T_{j} (2.92)	4.2 km	MPC · JPL
307782	2003 WT_{83}	—	November 21, 2003	Kitt Peak	Spacewatch	·	2.0 km	MPC · JPL
307783	2003 WJ_{87}	—	November 21, 2003	Socorro	LINEAR	·	5.9 km	MPC · JPL
307784	2003 WY_{97}	—	November 19, 2003	Anderson Mesa	LONEOS	BAR	2.1 km	MPC · JPL
307785	2003 WC_{100}	—	November 20, 2003	Socorro	LINEAR	(5)	1.3 km	MPC · JPL
307786	2003 WT_{100}	—	November 21, 2003	Palomar	NEAT	·	4.0 km	MPC · JPL
307787	2003 WJ_{103}	—	November 21, 2003	Socorro	LINEAR	·	1.1 km	MPC · JPL
307788	2003 WZ_{104}	—	November 21, 2003	Socorro	LINEAR	(5)	1.4 km	MPC · JPL
307789	2003 WN_{107}	—	November 23, 2003	Socorro	LINEAR	·	2.2 km	MPC · JPL
307790	2003 WD_{109}	—	November 20, 2003	Socorro	LINEAR	·	940 m	MPC · JPL
307791	2003 WZ_{115}	—	November 20, 2003	Socorro	LINEAR	EUN	1.7 km	MPC · JPL
307792	2003 WO_{116}	—	November 20, 2003	Socorro	LINEAR	T_{j} (2.98) · 3:2	4.4 km	MPC · JPL
307793	2003 WW_{116}	—	November 20, 2003	Socorro	LINEAR	EUN	1.8 km	MPC · JPL
307794	2003 WO_{117}	—	November 20, 2003	Socorro	LINEAR	·	1.7 km	MPC · JPL
307795	2003 WV_{122}	—	November 20, 2003	Socorro	LINEAR	·	3.0 km	MPC · JPL
307796	2003 WH_{123}	—	November 20, 2003	Socorro	LINEAR	·	1.7 km	MPC · JPL
307797	2003 WP_{123}	—	November 20, 2003	Socorro	LINEAR	(5)	1.4 km	MPC · JPL
307798	2003 WX_{124}	—	November 20, 2003	Socorro	LINEAR	HNS	1.9 km	MPC · JPL
307799	2003 WD_{126}	—	November 20, 2003	Socorro	LINEAR	(5)	1.4 km	MPC · JPL
307800	2003 WD_{128}	—	November 20, 2003	Socorro	LINEAR	H	1.3 km	MPC · JPL

== 307801–307900 ==
back to top

Designation			Discovery			Properties		Ref
Permanent	Provisional	Named after	Date	Site	Discoverer(s)	Category	Diam.	Ref
307801	2003 WF_{131}	—	November 21, 2003	Palomar	NEAT	·	1.7 km	MPC · JPL
307802	2003 WD_{137}	—	November 21, 2003	Socorro	LINEAR	·	1.3 km	MPC · JPL
307803	2003 WM_{137}	—	November 21, 2003	Socorro	LINEAR	·	1.5 km	MPC · JPL
307804	2003 WV_{139}	—	November 21, 2003	Socorro	LINEAR	H	750 m	MPC · JPL
307805	2003 WQ_{145}	—	November 21, 2003	Palomar	NEAT	·	2.3 km	MPC · JPL
307806	2003 WJ_{146}	—	November 23, 2003	Palomar	NEAT	·	1.7 km	MPC · JPL
307807	2003 WD_{147}	—	November 23, 2003	Socorro	LINEAR	·	780 m	MPC · JPL
307808	2003 WZ_{150}	—	November 24, 2003	Anderson Mesa	LONEOS	·	1.3 km	MPC · JPL
307809	2003 WU_{157}	—	November 30, 2003	Socorro	LINEAR	H	790 m	MPC · JPL
307810	2003 WR_{171}	—	November 23, 2003	Anderson Mesa	LONEOS	MAR	1.3 km	MPC · JPL
307811	2003 WY_{171}	—	November 29, 2003	Socorro	LINEAR	·	2.7 km	MPC · JPL
307812	2003 WQ_{181}	—	November 21, 2003	Kitt Peak	M. W. Buie	·	830 m	MPC · JPL
307813	2003 WA_{189}	—	November 19, 2003	Palomar	NEAT	·	1.6 km	MPC · JPL
307814	2003 WK_{193}	—	November 16, 2003	Apache Point	SDSS	·	1.1 km	MPC · JPL
307815	2003 WU_{193}	—	November 19, 2003	Kitt Peak	Spacewatch	·	840 m	MPC · JPL
307816	2003 WT_{194}	—	November 16, 2003	Apache Point	SDSS	H	640 m	MPC · JPL
307817	2003 XM_{2}	—	December 1, 2003	Socorro	LINEAR	·	1.4 km	MPC · JPL
307818	2003 XY_{12}	—	December 15, 2003	Socorro	LINEAR	H	1.3 km	MPC · JPL
307819	2003 XZ_{14}	—	December 15, 2003	Socorro	LINEAR	·	2.5 km	MPC · JPL
307820	2003 XJ_{15}	—	December 14, 2003	Kitt Peak	Spacewatch	H	790 m	MPC · JPL
307821	2003 XQ_{35}	—	December 3, 2003	Socorro	LINEAR	·	1.2 km	MPC · JPL
307822	2003 XO_{38}	—	December 4, 2003	Socorro	LINEAR	·	1.6 km	MPC · JPL
307823	2003 YT_{4}	—	December 16, 2003	Kitt Peak	Spacewatch	·	1.7 km	MPC · JPL
307824	2003 YV_{4}	—	December 16, 2003	Catalina	CSS	·	1.2 km	MPC · JPL
307825	2003 YT_{10}	—	December 17, 2003	Socorro	LINEAR	·	2.8 km	MPC · JPL
307826	2003 YC_{11}	—	December 17, 2003	Socorro	LINEAR	·	1.1 km	MPC · JPL
307827	2003 YZ_{17}	—	December 16, 2003	Anderson Mesa	LONEOS	·	1.9 km	MPC · JPL
307828	2003 YV_{24}	—	December 18, 2003	Socorro	LINEAR	(2076)	1.0 km	MPC · JPL
307829	2003 YB_{26}	—	December 18, 2003	Socorro	LINEAR	H	880 m	MPC · JPL
307830	2003 YQ_{40}	—	December 19, 2003	Kitt Peak	Spacewatch	·	1.5 km	MPC · JPL
307831	2003 YK_{44}	—	December 19, 2003	Kitt Peak	Spacewatch	(5)	1.4 km	MPC · JPL
307832	2003 YL_{46}	—	December 17, 2003	Socorro	LINEAR	·	1.5 km	MPC · JPL
307833	2003 YG_{48}	—	December 18, 2003	Socorro	LINEAR	·	1.3 km	MPC · JPL
307834	2003 YY_{52}	—	December 19, 2003	Palomar	NEAT	H	700 m	MPC · JPL
307835	2003 YF_{60}	—	December 19, 2003	Kitt Peak	Spacewatch	·	2.9 km	MPC · JPL
307836	2003 YV_{65}	—	December 20, 2003	Socorro	LINEAR	·	1.6 km	MPC · JPL
307837	2003 YF_{72}	—	December 18, 2003	Socorro	LINEAR	·	1.6 km	MPC · JPL
307838	2003 YW_{86}	—	December 19, 2003	Socorro	LINEAR	·	1.6 km	MPC · JPL
307839	2003 YR_{91}	—	December 20, 2003	Socorro	LINEAR	(5)	2.2 km	MPC · JPL
307840	2003 YA_{105}	—	December 21, 2003	Socorro	LINEAR	T_{j} (2.98)	7.9 km	MPC · JPL
307841	2003 YL_{105}	—	December 22, 2003	Socorro	LINEAR	BRG	2.2 km	MPC · JPL
307842	2003 YE_{107}	—	December 22, 2003	Kitt Peak	Spacewatch	·	1.9 km	MPC · JPL
307843	2003 YR_{113}	—	December 23, 2003	Socorro	LINEAR	·	1.6 km	MPC · JPL
307844	2003 YJ_{121}	—	December 27, 2003	Socorro	LINEAR	H	740 m	MPC · JPL
307845	2003 YV_{122}	—	December 27, 2003	Socorro	LINEAR	·	2.1 km	MPC · JPL
307846	2003 YA_{129}	—	December 27, 2003	Socorro	LINEAR	RAF	1.7 km	MPC · JPL
307847	2003 YN_{130}	—	December 28, 2003	Socorro	LINEAR	·	2.1 km	MPC · JPL
307848	2003 YR_{141}	—	December 28, 2003	Socorro	LINEAR	·	2.2 km	MPC · JPL
307849	2003 YF_{144}	—	December 28, 2003	Socorro	LINEAR	·	1.9 km	MPC · JPL
307850	2003 YY_{144}	—	December 28, 2003	Socorro	LINEAR	·	1.7 km	MPC · JPL
307851	2003 YT_{146}	—	December 28, 2003	Socorro	LINEAR	·	1.6 km	MPC · JPL
307852	2003 YS_{151}	—	December 29, 2003	Socorro	LINEAR	·	2.2 km	MPC · JPL
307853	2003 YL_{154}	—	December 29, 2003	Socorro	LINEAR	·	1.7 km	MPC · JPL
307854	2003 YG_{158}	—	December 17, 2003	Socorro	LINEAR	·	1.9 km	MPC · JPL
307855	2003 YU_{180}	—	December 17, 2003	Palomar	NEAT	·	1.9 km	MPC · JPL
307856	2004 AF_{5}	—	January 13, 2004	Anderson Mesa	LONEOS	·	1.4 km	MPC · JPL
307857	2004 AJ_{8}	—	January 14, 2004	Palomar	NEAT	H	750 m	MPC · JPL
307858	2004 AT_{8}	—	January 14, 2004	Palomar	NEAT	·	2.0 km	MPC · JPL
307859	2004 AV_{8}	—	January 14, 2004	Palomar	NEAT	·	1.8 km	MPC · JPL
307860	2004 AY_{18}	—	January 15, 2004	Kitt Peak	Spacewatch	·	1.5 km	MPC · JPL
307861	2004 AY_{26}	—	January 14, 2004	Palomar	NEAT	EUN	1.8 km	MPC · JPL
307862	2004 BW_{3}	—	January 16, 2004	Palomar	NEAT	NYS	1.3 km	MPC · JPL
307863	2004 BD_{5}	—	January 16, 2004	Palomar	NEAT	·	1.7 km	MPC · JPL
307864	2004 BN_{13}	—	January 17, 2004	Palomar	NEAT	·	1.4 km	MPC · JPL
307865	2004 BD_{18}	—	January 18, 2004	Catalina	CSS	·	2.2 km	MPC · JPL
307866	2004 BF_{18}	—	January 18, 2004	Palomar	NEAT	·	2.1 km	MPC · JPL
307867	2004 BX_{21}	—	January 19, 2004	Socorro	LINEAR	H	780 m	MPC · JPL
307868	2004 BP_{24}	—	January 19, 2004	Kitt Peak	Spacewatch	·	1.5 km	MPC · JPL
307869	2004 BR_{25}	—	January 19, 2004	Socorro	LINEAR	MAR	1.8 km	MPC · JPL
307870	2004 BP_{33}	—	January 19, 2004	Kitt Peak	Spacewatch	·	1.7 km	MPC · JPL
307871	2004 BO_{40}	—	January 21, 2004	Socorro	LINEAR	·	1.7 km	MPC · JPL
307872	2004 BN_{42}	—	January 18, 2004	Palomar	NEAT	·	2.3 km	MPC · JPL
307873	2004 BO_{55}	—	January 22, 2004	Socorro	LINEAR	·	1.1 km	MPC · JPL
307874	2004 BP_{57}	—	January 23, 2004	Socorro	LINEAR	·	2.1 km	MPC · JPL
307875	2004 BM_{60}	—	January 21, 2004	Socorro	LINEAR	·	2.8 km	MPC · JPL
307876	2004 BR_{65}	—	January 22, 2004	Socorro	LINEAR	·	1.6 km	MPC · JPL
307877	2004 BG_{69}	—	January 26, 2004	Kingsnake	J. V. McClusky	·	3.2 km	MPC · JPL
307878	2004 BX_{71}	—	January 23, 2004	Socorro	LINEAR	·	2.7 km	MPC · JPL
307879	2004 BF_{74}	—	January 24, 2004	Socorro	LINEAR	·	1.5 km	MPC · JPL
307880	2004 BH_{84}	—	January 25, 2004	Haleakala	NEAT	·	2.2 km	MPC · JPL
307881	2004 BV_{86}	—	January 22, 2004	Palomar	NEAT	·	2.1 km	MPC · JPL
307882	2004 BN_{94}	—	January 28, 2004	Socorro	LINEAR	·	2.1 km	MPC · JPL
307883	2004 BT_{107}	—	January 28, 2004	Catalina	CSS	JUN	1.4 km	MPC · JPL
307884	2004 BX_{109}	—	January 28, 2004	Kitt Peak	Spacewatch	·	1.8 km	MPC · JPL
307885	2004 BE_{112}	—	January 24, 2004	Socorro	LINEAR	·	1.8 km	MPC · JPL
307886	2004 BS_{119}	—	January 30, 2004	Catalina	CSS	·	2.3 km	MPC · JPL
307887	2004 BS_{145}	—	January 21, 2004	Socorro	LINEAR	·	2.1 km	MPC · JPL
307888	2004 BU_{151}	—	January 18, 2004	Palomar	NEAT	·	1.5 km	MPC · JPL
307889	2004 BH_{162}	—	January 23, 2004	Socorro	LINEAR	(5)	1.7 km	MPC · JPL
307890	2004 BJ_{162}	—	January 28, 2004	Apache Point	SDSS	·	2.1 km	MPC · JPL
307891	2004 CQ_{6}	—	February 11, 2004	Palomar	NEAT	EUN	1.7 km	MPC · JPL
307892	2004 CL_{7}	—	February 10, 2004	Catalina	CSS	·	1.4 km	MPC · JPL
307893	2004 CX_{8}	—	February 11, 2004	Kitt Peak	Spacewatch	·	1.5 km	MPC · JPL
307894	2004 CP_{18}	—	February 10, 2004	Palomar	NEAT	·	2.5 km	MPC · JPL
307895	2004 CJ_{24}	—	February 12, 2004	Palomar	NEAT	·	3.2 km	MPC · JPL
307896	2004 CQ_{31}	—	February 12, 2004	Kitt Peak	Spacewatch	·	1.6 km	MPC · JPL
307897	2004 CT_{35}	—	February 11, 2004	Catalina	CSS	·	2.3 km	MPC · JPL
307898	2004 CE_{37}	—	February 12, 2004	Palomar	NEAT	·	2.8 km	MPC · JPL
307899	2004 CZ_{54}	—	February 12, 2004	Kitt Peak	Spacewatch	·	2.1 km	MPC · JPL
307900	2004 CS_{58}	—	February 10, 2004	Palomar	NEAT	(5)	1.5 km	MPC · JPL

== 307901–308000 ==
back to top

Designation			Discovery			Properties		Ref
Permanent	Provisional	Named after	Date	Site	Discoverer(s)	Category	Diam.	Ref
307901	2004 CR_{61}	—	February 11, 2004	Kitt Peak	Spacewatch	·	1.3 km	MPC · JPL
307902	2004 CN_{63}	—	February 12, 2004	Palomar	NEAT	V	940 m	MPC · JPL
307903	2004 CP_{67}	—	February 10, 2004	Palomar	NEAT	·	1.6 km	MPC · JPL
307904	2004 CC_{69}	—	February 11, 2004	Kitt Peak	Spacewatch	·	1.4 km	MPC · JPL
307905	2004 CF_{69}	—	February 11, 2004	Kitt Peak	Spacewatch	·	1.7 km	MPC · JPL
307906	2004 CG_{71}	—	February 13, 2004	Kitt Peak	Spacewatch	·	2.6 km	MPC · JPL
307907	2004 CW_{79}	—	February 11, 2004	Palomar	NEAT	·	2.0 km	MPC · JPL
307908	2004 CX_{88}	—	February 11, 2004	Kitt Peak	Spacewatch	·	1.9 km	MPC · JPL
307909	2004 CW_{105}	—	February 14, 2004	Palomar	NEAT	·	3.0 km	MPC · JPL
307910	2004 CJ_{109}	—	February 15, 2004	Catalina	CSS	·	4.2 km	MPC · JPL
307911	2004 CU_{121}	—	February 12, 2004	Kitt Peak	Spacewatch	WIT	1.0 km	MPC · JPL
307912	2004 DM_{12}	—	February 18, 2004	Socorro	LINEAR	EUN	1.8 km	MPC · JPL
307913	2004 DB_{20}	—	February 17, 2004	Catalina	CSS	ADE	2.4 km	MPC · JPL
307914	2004 DF_{20}	—	February 17, 2004	Catalina	CSS	·	2.8 km	MPC · JPL
307915	2004 DL_{28}	—	February 17, 2004	Kitt Peak	Spacewatch	·	1.5 km	MPC · JPL
307916	2004 DO_{53}	—	February 23, 2004	Bergisch Gladbach	W. Bickel	MRX	1.1 km	MPC · JPL
307917	2004 EY_{1}	—	March 12, 2004	Palomar	NEAT	·	2.2 km	MPC · JPL
307918	2004 EU_{9}	—	March 15, 2004	Socorro	LINEAR	ATE	370 m	MPC · JPL
307919	2004 ET_{10}	—	March 15, 2004	Catalina	CSS	·	1.4 km	MPC · JPL
307920	2004 EF_{20}	—	March 14, 2004	Kitt Peak	Spacewatch	·	1.7 km	MPC · JPL
307921	2004 ET_{25}	—	March 13, 2004	Palomar	NEAT	MRX	1.3 km	MPC · JPL
307922	2004 EX_{27}	—	March 15, 2004	Kitt Peak	Spacewatch	KOR	1.3 km	MPC · JPL
307923	2004 ED_{30}	—	March 15, 2004	Kitt Peak	Spacewatch	·	1.3 km	MPC · JPL
307924	2004 EB_{31}	—	March 15, 2004	Catalina	CSS	H	670 m	MPC · JPL
307925	2004 EQ_{35}	—	March 13, 2004	Palomar	NEAT	ADE	2.4 km	MPC · JPL
307926	2004 EG_{37}	—	March 13, 2004	Palomar	NEAT	526	3.4 km	MPC · JPL
307927	2004 EO_{37}	—	March 14, 2004	Palomar	NEAT	·	2.0 km	MPC · JPL
307928	2004 EC_{38}	—	March 14, 2004	Palomar	NEAT	·	2.4 km	MPC · JPL
307929	2004 EN_{42}	—	March 15, 2004	Catalina	CSS	·	2.9 km	MPC · JPL
307930	2004 EC_{43}	—	March 15, 2004	Catalina	CSS	·	2.2 km	MPC · JPL
307931	2004 EQ_{48}	—	March 15, 2004	Socorro	LINEAR	·	2.0 km	MPC · JPL
307932	2004 EJ_{60}	—	March 15, 2004	Palomar	NEAT	·	1.9 km	MPC · JPL
307933	2004 ES_{64}	—	March 14, 2004	Socorro	LINEAR	·	2.9 km	MPC · JPL
307934	2004 EG_{65}	—	March 14, 2004	Socorro	LINEAR	·	1.7 km	MPC · JPL
307935	2004 EP_{65}	—	March 14, 2004	Socorro	LINEAR	·	2.3 km	MPC · JPL
307936	2004 ED_{68}	—	March 15, 2004	Socorro	LINEAR	EUN	1.7 km	MPC · JPL
307937	2004 ET_{82}	—	March 13, 2004	Palomar	NEAT	·	1.6 km	MPC · JPL
307938	2004 EE_{84}	—	March 14, 2004	Palomar	NEAT	EUN	2.9 km	MPC · JPL
307939	2004 EY_{84}	—	March 15, 2004	Catalina	CSS	·	2.2 km	MPC · JPL
307940	2004 EX_{85}	—	March 15, 2004	Socorro	LINEAR	·	1.2 km	MPC · JPL
307941	2004 FY_{18}	—	March 16, 2004	Kitt Peak	Spacewatch	·	1.6 km	MPC · JPL
307942	2004 FA_{29}	—	March 28, 2004	Socorro	LINEAR	H	700 m	MPC · JPL
307943	2004 FC_{66}	—	March 19, 2004	Socorro	LINEAR	·	2.6 km	MPC · JPL
307944	2004 FK_{78}	—	March 19, 2004	Kitt Peak	Spacewatch	·	1.7 km	MPC · JPL
307945	2004 FS_{86}	—	March 19, 2004	Palomar	NEAT	·	1.8 km	MPC · JPL
307946	2004 FX_{129}	—	March 20, 2004	Socorro	LINEAR	·	1.5 km	MPC · JPL
307947	2004 FP_{136}	—	March 27, 2004	Anderson Mesa	LONEOS	·	2.2 km	MPC · JPL
307948	2004 FW_{137}	—	March 29, 2004	Kitt Peak	Spacewatch	·	2.2 km	MPC · JPL
307949	2004 FV_{138}	—	March 18, 2004	Socorro	LINEAR	·	2.1 km	MPC · JPL
307950	2004 FF_{142}	—	March 27, 2004	Socorro	LINEAR	·	1.9 km	MPC · JPL
307951	2004 FG_{142}	—	March 27, 2004	Socorro	LINEAR	·	2.3 km	MPC · JPL
307952	2004 GD_{1}	—	February 17, 2004	Catalina	CSS	·	2.2 km	MPC · JPL
307953	2004 GU_{5}	—	April 11, 2004	Palomar	NEAT	·	4.2 km	MPC · JPL
307954	2004 GD_{10}	—	April 12, 2004	Kitt Peak	Spacewatch	·	2.3 km	MPC · JPL
307955	2004 GA_{23}	—	April 12, 2004	Kitt Peak	Spacewatch	·	1.4 km	MPC · JPL
307956	2004 GW_{27}	—	April 15, 2004	Palomar	NEAT	EUN	1.4 km	MPC · JPL
307957	2004 GF_{44}	—	April 12, 2004	Kitt Peak	Spacewatch	·	1.9 km	MPC · JPL
307958	2004 GV_{72}	—	April 14, 2004	Kitt Peak	Spacewatch	·	1.2 km	MPC · JPL
307959	2004 GM_{75}	—	April 15, 2004	Anderson Mesa	LONEOS	·	1.6 km	MPC · JPL
307960	2004 GS_{75}	—	April 15, 2004	Siding Spring	SSS	·	4.5 km	MPC · JPL
307961	2004 HA_{16}	—	April 16, 2004	Socorro	LINEAR	·	2.7 km	MPC · JPL
307962	2004 HH_{29}	—	April 21, 2004	Kitt Peak	Spacewatch	·	1.8 km	MPC · JPL
307963	2004 HF_{51}	—	April 24, 2004	Catalina	CSS	JUN	1.8 km	MPC · JPL
307964	2004 HM_{60}	—	April 25, 2004	Socorro	LINEAR	·	2.5 km	MPC · JPL
307965	2004 HL_{65}	—	April 17, 2004	Socorro	LINEAR	·	2.5 km	MPC · JPL
307966	2004 JG_{7}	—	May 9, 2004	Palomar	NEAT	·	2.1 km	MPC · JPL
307967	2004 JG_{13}	—	May 13, 2004	Socorro	LINEAR	H	800 m	MPC · JPL
307968	2004 JK_{16}	—	May 11, 2004	Anderson Mesa	LONEOS	·	1.5 km	MPC · JPL
307969	2004 JB_{19}	—	May 13, 2004	Kitt Peak	Spacewatch	MRX	1.5 km	MPC · JPL
307970	2004 JX_{44}	—	May 14, 2004	Socorro	LINEAR	PHO	1.6 km	MPC · JPL
307971	2004 LG_{6}	—	June 11, 2004	Socorro	LINEAR	·	3.6 km	MPC · JPL
307972	2004 LH_{16}	—	June 12, 2004	Socorro	LINEAR	·	2.3 km	MPC · JPL
307973	2004 NT_{23}	—	July 14, 2004	Socorro	LINEAR	·	2.2 km	MPC · JPL
307974	2004 NJ_{26}	—	July 11, 2004	Socorro	LINEAR	·	620 m	MPC · JPL
307975	2004 PS_{29}	—	August 7, 2004	Palomar	NEAT	·	840 m	MPC · JPL
307976	2004 PO_{43}	—	August 6, 2004	Palomar	NEAT	·	780 m	MPC · JPL
307977	2004 PL_{50}	—	August 8, 2004	Socorro	LINEAR	·	1.3 km	MPC · JPL
307978	2004 PA_{53}	—	August 8, 2004	Socorro	LINEAR	V	890 m	MPC · JPL
307979	2004 PR_{53}	—	August 8, 2004	Socorro	LINEAR	·	1.1 km	MPC · JPL
307980	2004 PS_{64}	—	August 10, 2004	Socorro	LINEAR	·	1.1 km	MPC · JPL
307981	2004 PM_{80}	—	August 9, 2004	Socorro	LINEAR	MAR	1.3 km	MPC · JPL
307982	2004 PG_{115}	—	August 4, 2004	Palomar	Palomar	SDO	334 km	MPC · JPL
307983	2004 QN_{6}	—	August 21, 2004	Catalina	CSS	·	690 m	MPC · JPL
307984	2004 QV_{13}	—	August 20, 2004	Socorro	LINEAR	·	1.7 km	MPC · JPL
307985	2004 QX_{21}	—	August 25, 2004	Kitt Peak	Spacewatch	·	790 m	MPC · JPL
307986	2004 QT_{26}	—	August 26, 2004	Socorro	LINEAR	·	2.0 km	MPC · JPL
307987	2004 QP_{27}	—	August 26, 2004	Siding Spring	SSS	·	760 m	MPC · JPL
307988	2004 RL_{1}	—	September 4, 2004	Palomar	NEAT	PHO	1.3 km	MPC · JPL
307989	2004 RE_{3}	—	September 6, 2004	Socorro	LINEAR	·	6.5 km	MPC · JPL
307990	2004 RR_{12}	—	September 3, 2004	Anderson Mesa	LONEOS	·	2.2 km	MPC · JPL
307991	2004 RY_{25}	—	September 4, 2004	Palomar	NEAT	·	3.1 km	MPC · JPL
307992	2004 RL_{29}	—	September 7, 2004	Socorro	LINEAR	·	1.9 km	MPC · JPL
307993	2004 RO_{49}	—	September 8, 2004	Socorro	LINEAR	·	770 m	MPC · JPL
307994	2004 RJ_{53}	—	September 8, 2004	Socorro	LINEAR	·	890 m	MPC · JPL
307995	2004 RF_{57}	—	September 8, 2004	Socorro	LINEAR	·	1.5 km	MPC · JPL
307996	2004 RH_{66}	—	September 8, 2004	Socorro	LINEAR	·	760 m	MPC · JPL
307997	2004 RU_{74}	—	September 8, 2004	Socorro	LINEAR	·	1.1 km	MPC · JPL
307998	2004 RF_{98}	—	September 8, 2004	Socorro	LINEAR	·	1.2 km	MPC · JPL
307999	2004 RZ_{98}	—	September 8, 2004	Socorro	LINEAR	·	830 m	MPC · JPL
308000	2004 RM_{101}	—	September 8, 2004	Socorro	LINEAR	·	840 m	MPC · JPL

back to top

== See also ==
- Meanings of minor-planet names: 307001–308000
