= John V. McClusky =

American astronomer

Minor planets discovered: 156
see § List of discovered minor planets

John V. McClusky is an American astronomer. He is a prolific discoverer of asteroids.

== List of discovered minor planets ==
13389 Stacey	10 January 1999	list
27267 Wiberg	28 December 1999	list
(29651) 1998 WA_{9}	22 November 1998	list
(31318) 1998 GQ_{10}	4 April 1998	list
(31420) 1999 BV	16 January 1999	list
(37280) 2000 YT_{19}	28 December 2000	list
(37390) 2001 WL_{49}	30 November 2001	list
(44468) 1998 VH_{34}	11 November 1998	list
(44545) 1999 AJ_{24}	13 January 1999	list
47044 Mcpainter	16 November 1998	list
(49298) 1998 VS_{5}	2 November 1998	list
(49465) 1999 AT_{8}	10 January 1999	list
(52004) 2001 YH_{2}	18 December 2001	list
(56081) 1999 AU_{8}	10 January 1999	list
(64838) 2001 YJ_{2}	18 December 2001	list
(68570) 2001 YQ_{4}	23 December 2001	list
(72945) 2002 CJ_{16}	7 February 2002	list
(76229) 2000 EK_{75}	4 March 2000	list
(82076) 2001 AU_{25}	4 January 2001	list
(83972) 2002 AZ_{34}	9 January 2002	list
(84618) 2002 VF_{40}	8 November 2002	list
(84650) 2002 VC_{66}	7 November 2002	list
(84717) 2002 VD_{128}	13 November 2002	list
(84722) 2002 WV_{2}	23 November 2002	list
(84830) 2003 AP_{4}	1 January 2003	list

(85857) 1999 AK_{24}	15 January 1999	list
(90434) 2004 BF_{69}	20 January 2004	list
(94771) 2001 XF_{105}	14 December 2001	list
(99373) 2001 YU	18 December 2001	list
(106851) 2000 YS_{19}	28 December 2000	list
114094 Irvpatterson	6 November 2002	list
114096 Haroldbier	8 November 2002	list
(114097) 2002 VB_{40}	8 November 2002	list
(114153) 2002 VB_{66}	7 November 2002	list
(115431) 2003 TJ_{1}	4 October 2003	list
(115490) 2003 UQ_{21}	20 October 2003	list
(115491) 2003 UT_{21}	21 October 2003	list
(116143) 2003 WO_{152}	25 November 2003	list
(123747) 2001 AV_{25}	4 January 2001	list
(125524) 2001 WK_{49}	25 November 2001	list
126444 Wylie	7 February 2002	list
126445 Prestonreeves	7 February 2002	list
(127929) 2003 GL_{53}	9 April 2003	list
(128266) 2003 TB_{1}	4 October 2003	list
(131701) 2001 YV	18 December 2001	list
(133558) 2003 UP_{7}	16 October 2003	list
(134935) 2001 BL_{11}	21 January 2001	list
(135515) 2001 YT	18 December 2001	list
(138113) 2000 DR_{110}	27 February 2000	list
(138563) 2000 QE_{69}	27 August 2000	list

(141397) 2002 AS_{129}	15 January 2002	list
(141398) 2002 AV_{129}	15 January 2002	list
(149924) 2005 SS_{116}	27 September 2005	list
(151197) 2001 YS	18 December 2001	list
(153216) 2000 YR_{19}	28 December 2000	list
(155845) 2001 AG_{3}	4 January 2001	list
(156372) 2001 YT_{4}	23 December 2001	list
(156703) 2002 LF_{47}	14 June 2002	list
(157072) 2003 UM_{7}	18 October 2003	list
(159167) 2005 RP_{25}	10 September 2005	list
(160956) 2002 AU_{129}	15 January 2002	list
(163958) 2003 UY_{55}	24 October 2003	list
(164185) 2004 BD_{69}	20 January 2004	list
(166787) 2002 VE_{40}	8 November 2002	list
(166899) 2003 AT_{4}	1 January 2003	list
(172535) 2003 UV_{21}	21 October 2003	list
(174765) 2003 WZ_{25}	19 November 2003	list
(174815) 2003 YM_{3}	19 December 2003	list
(176500) 2001 YL_{2}	18 December 2001	list
(177854) 2005 PY_{5}	4 August 2005	list
(179382) 2001 YA_{5}	23 December 2001	list
(183356) 2002 VH_{124}	6 November 2002	list
(186257) 2001 YR_{4}	23 December 2001	list
(186281) 2002 AZ_{129}	15 January 2002	list
(189212) 2003 UY_{21}	22 October 2003	list

(191484) 2003 TA_{1}	3 October 2003	list
(191496) 2003 UU_{21}	21 October 2003	list
(196188) 2003 AS_{4}	1 January 2003	list
(197326) 2003 WP_{152}	25 November 2003	list
(200504) 2001 AX_{25}	4 January 2001	list
(204003) 2003 UQ_{7}	16 October 2003	list
(204008) 2003 UR_{21}	20 October 2003	list
(206216) 2002 VD_{40}	8 November 2002	list
(206262) 2002 XA_{91}	14 December 2002	list
(206646) 2003 YG_{3}	19 December 2003	list
(211323) 2002 SB_{59}	28 September 2002	list
(211712) 2003 YH_{3}	19 December 2003	list
(215440) 2002 LD_{47}	15 June 2002	list
(216590) 2002 LC_{47}	15 June 2002	list
(218611) 2005 PL	2 August 2005	list
(224160) 2005 QB_{75}	25 August 2005	list
(225874) 2001 YS_{4}	23 December 2001	list
(226507) 2003 TT	3 October 2003	list
(226512) 2003 UC_{25}	20 October 2003	list
(228572) 2001 YY_{4}	23 December 2001	list
(228765) 2002 VH_{131}	13 November 2002	list
(229372) 2005 RM_{9}	3 September 2005	list
(230680) 2003 TD_{1}	4 October 2003	list
(233082) 2005 QX_{74}	24 August 2005	list
(235282) 2003 UO_{19}	20 October 2003	list

(242135) 2003 AQ_{4}	1 January 2003	list
(247646) 2002 VJ_{131}	13 November 2002	list
(247679) 2003 AR_{4}	1 January 2003	list
(247856) 2003 UR_{7}	18 October 2003	list
(260910) 2005 RY_{10}	10 September 2005	list
(260950) 2005 SY_{19}	25 September 2005	list
(264298) 1998 WR_{7}	16 November 1998	list
(264677) 2001 YZ_{4}	23 December 2001	list
(267872) 2003 WD_{157}	29 November 2003	list
(270000) 2000 YQ_{19}	28 December 2000	list
(270350) 2001 YX_{4}	23 December 2001	list
(270387) 2002 AY_{129}	15 January 2002	list
(276034) 2002 AA_{130}	15 January 2002	list
(283593) 2001 YU_{4}	23 December 2001	list
(288199) 2003 YL_{3}	19 December 2003	list
(298425) 2003 TU	3 October 2003	list
(298437) 2003 UN_{19}	20 October 2003	list
(302339) 2002 AB_{130}	15 January 2002	list
(306766) 2001 AW_{25}	4 January 2001	list
(307046) 2001 YF_{6}	23 December 2001	list
(307465) 2002 WW_{2}	23 November 2002	list
(307682) 2003 TF_{1}	4 October 2003	list
(307693) 2003 UM_{19}	20 October 2003	list
(307877) 2004 BG_{69}	26 January 2004	list
(313122) 2000 YU_{137}	29 December 2000	list

(313504) 2002 VO_{115}	11 November 2002	list
(317990) 2004 BK_{69}	26 January 2004	list
(323285) 2003 TC_{1}	4 October 2003	list
(326812) 2003 TG_{1}	4 October 2003	list
(332026) 2005 PH	2 August 2005	list
(334910) 2003 YJ_{3}	19 December 2003	list
(335341) 2005 SX_{19}	25 September 2005	list
(338693) 2003 US_{7}	18 October 2003	list
(338699) 2003 UZ_{24}	20 October 2003	list
(338839) 2003 WN_{152}	25 November 2003	list
(344715) 2003 UX_{21}	22 October 2003	list
(347731) 2001 YG_{6}	23 December 2001	list
(347749) 2002 AT_{129}	15 January 2002	list
(354707) 2005 RJ_{34}	10 September 2005	list
(357136) 2002 AC_{130}	15 January 2002	list
(373589) 2002 CG_{16}	7 February 2002	list
(374281) 2005 PE_{21}	12 August 2005	list
(376903) 2001 YB_{6}	23 December 2001	list
(380456) 2003 UZ_{21}	22 October 2003	list
(390982) 2005 SZ_{19}	25 September 2005	list
(396709) 2002 VZ_{39}	7 November 2002	list
(402070) 2003 UB_{25}	20 October 2003	list
(405304) 2003 UH_{25}	22 October 2003	list
(405305) 2003 UJ_{25}	22 October 2003	list
(416546) 2004 BE_{69}	20 January 2004	list

(430523) 2002 AX_{129}	15 January 2002	list
(443992) 2003 WT_{171}	29 November 2003	list
(452458) 2003 TH_{1}	4 October 2003	list
(481076) 2005 SV_{19}	25 September 2005	list
(495842) 2001 XE_{105}	14 December 2001	list
(506466) 2002 LG_{47}	14 June 2002	list

== See also ==
- List of minor planet discoverers
