= Meanings of minor-planet names: 308001–309000 =

As minor planet discoveries are confirmed, they are given a permanent number by the IAU's Minor Planet Center (MPC), and the discoverers can then submit names for them, following the IAU's naming conventions. The list below concerns those minor planets in the specified number-range that have received names, and explains the meanings of those names.

Official naming citations of newly named small Solar System bodies are approved and published in a bulletin by IAU's Working Group for Small Bodies Nomenclature (WGSBN). Before May 2021, citations were published in MPC's Minor Planet Circulars for many decades. Recent citations can also be found on the JPL Small-Body Database (SBDB). Until his death in 2016, German astronomer Lutz D. Schmadel compiled these citations into the Dictionary of Minor Planet Names (DMP) and regularly updated the collection.

Based on Paul Herget's The Names of the Minor Planets, Schmadel also researched the unclear origin of numerous asteroids, most of which had been named prior to World War II. This article incorporates text from this source, which is in the public domain: SBDB New namings may only be added to this list below after official publication as the preannouncement of names is condemned. The WGSBN publishes a comprehensive guideline for the naming rules of non-cometary small Solar System bodies.

== 308001–308100 ==
Named minor planet	Provisional	This minor planet was named for...	Ref · Catalog
There are no named minor planets in this number range

== 308101–308200 ==
back to top

Named minor planet	Provisional	This minor planet was named for...	Ref · Catalog
308197 Satrapi	2005 EV_{27}	Marjane Satrapi (born 1969), an Iranian-born French graphic novelist, illustrator, film director, and children's book author	JPL · 308197

== 308201–308300 ==
back to top

Named minor planet	Provisional	This minor planet was named for...	Ref · Catalog
There are no named minor planets in this number range

== 308301–308400 ==
back to top

Named minor planet	Provisional	This minor planet was named for...	Ref · Catalog
308306 Dainere	2005 KL_{8}	Dainere Monique Anthoney (born 1998), an inspiring Australian teenager, author and blogger who raises awareness and funds for brain tumour research.	JPL · 308306

== 308401–308500 ==
back to top

Named minor planet	Provisional	This minor planet was named for...	Ref · Catalog
There are no named minor planets in this number range

== 308501–308600 ==
back to top

Named minor planet	Provisional	This minor planet was named for...	Ref · Catalog
There are no named minor planets in this number range

== 308601–308700 ==
back to top

Named minor planet	Provisional	This minor planet was named for...	Ref · Catalog
308680 McLennan	2006 DY_{62}	Ian C. McLennan (born 1938) was the founding director of the Queen Elizabeth Planetarium in Edmonton, Alberta, Canada, and for the last 60 years has provided extensive experience in public project planning and administration in cultural and educational organizations.	IAU · 308680

== 308701–308800 ==
back to top

Named minor planet	Provisional	This minor planet was named for...	Ref · Catalog
308753 Daniellezemp	2006 JD_{79}	Danielle Zemp, Swiss administrator who has been the backbone supporting astrophysicists at the Center for Space and Habitability of the University of Bern and at the International Space Science Institute in Bern, Switzerland for many years.	IAU · 308753
308798 Teo	2006 QL_{57}	Teodoro "Teo" Encinar (born 1952) built, according to the discoverer's design, the La Cañada Observatory, Spain, over the summer of 2002.	JPL · 308798

== 308801–308900 ==
back to top

Named minor planet	Provisional	This minor planet was named for...	Ref · Catalog
308825 Siksika	2006 RH_{3}	Siksika Nation, which is one of the three First Nations, with the Piikani (Peigan) and Kainai (Blood), that comprise the Blackfoot Confederacy.	JPL · 308825
308856 Daniket	2006 RS_{109}	Daniela Ketskarova Masiero (born 2015), daughter of American discoverer Joseph Masiero	JPL · 308856

== 308901–309000 ==
back to top

Named minor planet	Provisional	This minor planet was named for...	Ref · Catalog
308934 Merkinė	2006 SV_{372}	Merkinė, one of the oldest small towns in Lithuania.	JPL · 308934

back to top

Preceded by 307,001–308,000	Meanings of minor-planet names List of minor planets: 308,001–309,000	Succeeded by 309,001–310,000
