= List of minor planets: 308001–309000 =

The following is a partial list of minor planets, running from minor-planet number 308001 through 309000, inclusive. The primary data for this and other partial lists is based on JPL's "Small-Body Orbital Elements" and data available from the Minor Planet Center. Critical list information is also provided by the MPC, unless otherwise specified from Lowell Observatory. A detailed description of the table's columns and additional sources are given on the main page including a complete list of every page in this series, and a statistical break-up on the dynamical classification of minor planets.

Also see the summary list of all named bodies in numerical and alphabetical order, and the corresponding naming citations for the number range of this particular list. New namings may only be added to this list after official publication, as the preannouncement of names is condemned by the Working Group for Small Bodies Nomenclature of the International Astronomical Union.

Near-Earth obj.	MBA (inner)	MBA (outer)	Centaur
Mars-crosser	MBA (middle)	Jupiter trojan	Trans-Neptunian obj.
Unclassified

== 308001–308100 ==
Designation			Discovery			Properties		Ref
Permanent	Provisional	Named after	Date	Site	Discoverer(s)	Category	Diam.	Ref
308001	2004 RS_{102}	—	September 8, 2004	Socorro	LINEAR	·	700 m	MPC · JPL
308002	2004 RY_{104}	—	September 8, 2004	Palomar	NEAT	·	920 m	MPC · JPL
308003	2004 RM_{108}	—	September 9, 2004	Kitt Peak	Spacewatch	·	760 m	MPC · JPL
308004	2004 RT_{110}	—	September 11, 2004	Socorro	LINEAR	·	1.8 km	MPC · JPL
308005	2004 RV_{117}	—	September 7, 2004	Kitt Peak	Spacewatch	·	1.9 km	MPC · JPL
308006	2004 RL_{137}	—	September 8, 2004	Socorro	LINEAR	fast	4.7 km	MPC · JPL
308007	2004 RS_{138}	—	September 8, 2004	Palomar	NEAT	·	880 m	MPC · JPL
308008	2004 RN_{150}	—	September 9, 2004	Socorro	LINEAR	·	910 m	MPC · JPL
308009	2004 RX_{153}	—	September 10, 2004	Socorro	LINEAR	·	1.6 km	MPC · JPL
308010	2004 RE_{185}	—	September 10, 2004	Socorro	LINEAR	·	1.6 km	MPC · JPL
308011	2004 RQ_{186}	—	September 10, 2004	Socorro	LINEAR	·	1.0 km	MPC · JPL
308012	2004 RD_{195}	—	September 10, 2004	Socorro	LINEAR	·	5.1 km	MPC · JPL
308013	2004 RG_{197}	—	September 10, 2004	Socorro	LINEAR	·	3.0 km	MPC · JPL
308014	2004 RH_{197}	—	September 10, 2004	Socorro	LINEAR	·	800 m	MPC · JPL
308015	2004 RY_{210}	—	September 11, 2004	Socorro	LINEAR	(1118)	5.6 km	MPC · JPL
308016	2004 RW_{213}	—	September 11, 2004	Socorro	LINEAR	·	1.8 km	MPC · JPL
308017	2004 RJ_{218}	—	September 11, 2004	Socorro	LINEAR	EUN	1.9 km	MPC · JPL
308018	2004 RA_{219}	—	September 11, 2004	Socorro	LINEAR	·	2.4 km	MPC · JPL
308019	2004 RA_{221}	—	September 11, 2004	Socorro	LINEAR	·	3.0 km	MPC · JPL
308020	2004 RM_{222}	—	September 13, 2004	Socorro	LINEAR	·	3.9 km	MPC · JPL
308021	2004 RU_{226}	—	September 9, 2004	Socorro	LINEAR	·	1.1 km	MPC · JPL
308022	2004 RU_{232}	—	September 9, 2004	Kitt Peak	Spacewatch	·	1.0 km	MPC · JPL
308023	2004 RK_{254}	—	September 6, 2004	Palomar	NEAT	·	700 m	MPC · JPL
308024	2004 RU_{255}	—	September 6, 2004	Palomar	NEAT	H · fast	800 m	MPC · JPL
308025	2004 RB_{271}	—	September 11, 2004	Kitt Peak	Spacewatch	·	1.1 km	MPC · JPL
308026	2004 RF_{279}	—	September 15, 2004	Kitt Peak	Spacewatch	·	910 m	MPC · JPL
308027	2004 RG_{322}	—	September 13, 2004	Socorro	LINEAR	·	990 m	MPC · JPL
308028	2004 RF_{328}	—	September 15, 2004	Kitt Peak	Spacewatch	·	1.3 km	MPC · JPL
308029	2004 RO_{346}	—	September 10, 2004	Socorro	LINEAR	·	3.5 km	MPC · JPL
308030	2004 SD_{4}	—	September 17, 2004	Kitt Peak	Spacewatch	·	840 m	MPC · JPL
308031	2004 SH_{5}	—	September 19, 2004	CBA-East	Skillman, D. R.	·	710 m	MPC · JPL
308032	2004 SN_{11}	—	September 16, 2004	Siding Spring	SSS	·	1.6 km	MPC · JPL
308033	2004 SO_{29}	—	September 17, 2004	Socorro	LINEAR	·	750 m	MPC · JPL
308034	2004 SP_{30}	—	September 17, 2004	Socorro	LINEAR	·	3.5 km	MPC · JPL
308035	2004 SV_{31}	—	September 17, 2004	Socorro	LINEAR	·	4.5 km	MPC · JPL
308036	2004 SZ_{32}	—	September 17, 2004	Socorro	LINEAR	(2076)	970 m	MPC · JPL
308037	2004 ST_{33}	—	September 17, 2004	Socorro	LINEAR	·	2.9 km	MPC · JPL
308038	2004 SJ_{43}	—	September 18, 2004	Socorro	LINEAR	·	950 m	MPC · JPL
308039	2004 SA_{44}	—	September 18, 2004	Socorro	LINEAR	·	690 m	MPC · JPL
308040	2004 SA_{61}	—	September 18, 2004	Socorro	LINEAR	·	2.2 km	MPC · JPL
308041	2004 TN	—	October 4, 2004	Kitt Peak	Spacewatch	APO	550 m	MPC · JPL
308042	2004 TV_{8}	—	October 5, 2004	Anderson Mesa	LONEOS	H	700 m	MPC · JPL
308043	2004 TH_{10}	—	October 8, 2004	Socorro	LINEAR	APO	690 m	MPC · JPL
308044	2004 TZ_{15}	—	October 10, 2004	Socorro	LINEAR	·	810 m	MPC · JPL
308045	2004 TN_{17}	—	October 6, 2004	Palomar	NEAT	·	3.1 km	MPC · JPL
308046	2004 TX_{17}	—	October 12, 2004	Moletai	K. Černis, Zdanavicius, J.	·	950 m	MPC · JPL
308047	2004 TA_{25}	—	October 4, 2004	Kitt Peak	Spacewatch	·	740 m	MPC · JPL
308048	2004 TV_{35}	—	October 4, 2004	Kitt Peak	Spacewatch	·	1.0 km	MPC · JPL
308049	2004 TO_{36}	—	October 4, 2004	Kitt Peak	Spacewatch	·	860 m	MPC · JPL
308050	2004 TS_{37}	—	October 4, 2004	Kitt Peak	Spacewatch	·	770 m	MPC · JPL
308051	2004 TP_{39}	—	October 4, 2004	Kitt Peak	Spacewatch	·	810 m	MPC · JPL
308052	2004 TZ_{46}	—	October 4, 2004	Kitt Peak	Spacewatch	V	750 m	MPC · JPL
308053	2004 TD_{51}	—	October 4, 2004	Kitt Peak	Spacewatch	·	770 m	MPC · JPL
308054	2004 TQ_{63}	—	October 5, 2004	Kitt Peak	Spacewatch	·	880 m	MPC · JPL
308055	2004 TV_{68}	—	October 5, 2004	Anderson Mesa	LONEOS	·	1.3 km	MPC · JPL
308056	2004 TX_{91}	—	October 5, 2004	Kitt Peak	Spacewatch	·	880 m	MPC · JPL
308057	2004 TK_{102}	—	October 6, 2004	Kitt Peak	Spacewatch	·	960 m	MPC · JPL
308058	2004 TW_{116}	—	October 4, 2004	Anderson Mesa	LONEOS	·	1.8 km	MPC · JPL
308059	2004 TZ_{119}	—	October 6, 2004	Palomar	NEAT	·	780 m	MPC · JPL
308060	2004 TX_{134}	—	August 15, 2004	Siding Spring	SSS	·	780 m	MPC · JPL
308061	2004 TL_{147}	—	October 6, 2004	Kitt Peak	Spacewatch	·	4.0 km	MPC · JPL
308062	2004 TS_{147}	—	October 6, 2004	Kitt Peak	Spacewatch	·	1.1 km	MPC · JPL
308063	2004 TV_{153}	—	October 6, 2004	Kitt Peak	Spacewatch	·	940 m	MPC · JPL
308064	2004 TJ_{155}	—	October 6, 2004	Kitt Peak	Spacewatch	·	1.0 km	MPC · JPL
308065	2004 TD_{158}	—	October 6, 2004	Kitt Peak	Spacewatch	·	1.0 km	MPC · JPL
308066	2004 TZ_{159}	—	October 6, 2004	Kitt Peak	Spacewatch	·	840 m	MPC · JPL
308067	2004 TW_{172}	—	October 8, 2004	Socorro	LINEAR	TRE	4.8 km	MPC · JPL
308068	2004 TB_{183}	—	October 7, 2004	Kitt Peak	Spacewatch	·	1.1 km	MPC · JPL
308069	2004 TH_{199}	—	October 7, 2004	Kitt Peak	Spacewatch	·	900 m	MPC · JPL
308070	2004 TE_{207}	—	October 7, 2004	Kitt Peak	Spacewatch	·	3.8 km	MPC · JPL
308071	2004 TM_{208}	—	October 7, 2004	Kitt Peak	Spacewatch	·	910 m	MPC · JPL
308072	2004 TJ_{211}	—	October 8, 2004	Kitt Peak	Spacewatch	·	5.2 km	MPC · JPL
308073	2004 TV_{228}	—	October 8, 2004	Kitt Peak	Spacewatch	·	620 m	MPC · JPL
308074	2004 TL_{238}	—	October 9, 2004	Anderson Mesa	LONEOS	·	1.3 km	MPC · JPL
308075	2004 TF_{240}	—	October 9, 2004	Kitt Peak	Spacewatch	·	1.1 km	MPC · JPL
308076	2004 TX_{240}	—	October 10, 2004	Socorro	LINEAR	·	840 m	MPC · JPL
308077	2004 TF_{273}	—	October 9, 2004	Kitt Peak	Spacewatch	ULA · CYB	5.5 km	MPC · JPL
308078	2004 TX_{280}	—	October 10, 2004	Kitt Peak	Spacewatch	·	830 m	MPC · JPL
308079	2004 TW_{292}	—	October 10, 2004	Kitt Peak	Spacewatch	·	810 m	MPC · JPL
308080	2004 TK_{301}	—	October 8, 2004	Anderson Mesa	LONEOS	TRE	4.2 km	MPC · JPL
308081	2004 TF_{302}	—	October 9, 2004	Anderson Mesa	LONEOS	·	820 m	MPC · JPL
308082	2004 TG_{310}	—	October 10, 2004	Socorro	LINEAR	·	3.8 km	MPC · JPL
308083	2004 UN	—	October 17, 2004	Socorro	LINEAR	H	720 m	MPC · JPL
308084	2004 UF_{1}	—	October 20, 2004	Socorro	LINEAR	·	1.0 km	MPC · JPL
308085	2004 UP_{6}	—	October 20, 2004	Socorro	LINEAR	·	750 m	MPC · JPL
308086	2004 UM_{8}	—	October 21, 2004	Socorro	LINEAR	·	850 m	MPC · JPL
308087	2004 VJ	—	November 2, 2004	Palomar	NEAT	·	880 m	MPC · JPL
308088	2004 VP_{4}	—	November 3, 2004	Palomar	NEAT	·	2.5 km	MPC · JPL
308089	2004 VT_{6}	—	November 3, 2004	Kitt Peak	Spacewatch	·	1.3 km	MPC · JPL
308090	2004 VH_{9}	—	November 3, 2004	Catalina	CSS	MAR	1.8 km	MPC · JPL
308091	2004 VQ_{9}	—	November 3, 2004	Anderson Mesa	LONEOS	·	1.6 km	MPC · JPL
308092	2004 VQ_{12}	—	November 3, 2004	Catalina	CSS	·	1.1 km	MPC · JPL
308093	2004 VT_{13}	—	November 3, 2004	Goodricke-Pigott	R. A. Tucker	·	1.9 km	MPC · JPL
308094	2004 VD_{14}	—	November 4, 2004	Anderson Mesa	LONEOS	V	930 m	MPC · JPL
308095	2004 VD_{21}	—	October 18, 2004	Kitt Peak	Spacewatch	(1118)	5.0 km	MPC · JPL
308096	2004 VY_{22}	—	November 4, 2004	Catalina	CSS	·	1.0 km	MPC · JPL
308097	2004 VL_{26}	—	November 4, 2004	Catalina	CSS	·	1.2 km	MPC · JPL
308098	2004 VF_{28}	—	November 6, 2004	Catalina	CSS	·	1.8 km	MPC · JPL
308099	2004 VC_{33}	—	November 3, 2004	Kitt Peak	Spacewatch	·	860 m	MPC · JPL
308100	2004 VU_{39}	—	November 4, 2004	Kitt Peak	Spacewatch	·	740 m	MPC · JPL

== 308101–308200 ==
back to top

Designation			Discovery			Properties		Ref
Permanent	Provisional	Named after	Date	Site	Discoverer(s)	Category	Diam.	Ref
308101	2004 VE_{52}	—	November 4, 2004	Catalina	CSS	·	880 m	MPC · JPL
308102	2004 VG_{60}	—	November 9, 2004	Catalina	CSS	·	1.0 km	MPC · JPL
308103	2004 VM_{60}	—	November 10, 2004	Kitt Peak	Spacewatch	·	900 m	MPC · JPL
308104	2004 VS_{70}	—	November 4, 2004	Catalina	CSS	(2076)	900 m	MPC · JPL
308105	2004 VC_{104}	—	November 9, 2004	Mauna Kea	Veillet, C.	·	710 m	MPC · JPL
308106	2004 WG	—	November 17, 2004	Siding Spring	SSS	T_{j} (2.95)	6.5 km	MPC · JPL
308107	2004 WT_{9}	—	November 30, 2004	Socorro	LINEAR	H	850 m	MPC · JPL
308108	2004 XB	—	December 1, 2004	Catalina	CSS	·	1.1 km	MPC · JPL
308109	2004 XW_{2}	—	December 2, 2004	Catalina	CSS	NYS	1.2 km	MPC · JPL
308110	2004 XF_{4}	—	October 13, 2001	Anderson Mesa	LONEOS	H	780 m	MPC · JPL
308111	2004 XW_{5}	—	December 8, 2004	Socorro	LINEAR	PHO	1.1 km	MPC · JPL
308112	2004 XH_{15}	—	December 8, 2004	Socorro	LINEAR	·	1.2 km	MPC · JPL
308113	2004 XV_{23}	—	December 9, 2004	Socorro	LINEAR	·	2.1 km	MPC · JPL
308114	2004 XZ_{27}	—	December 10, 2004	Socorro	LINEAR	·	1.2 km	MPC · JPL
308115	2004 XQ_{51}	—	December 10, 2004	Socorro	LINEAR	V	870 m	MPC · JPL
308116	2004 XG_{52}	—	December 8, 2004	Socorro	LINEAR	V	910 m	MPC · JPL
308117	2004 XD_{61}	—	December 10, 2004	Socorro	LINEAR	·	2.2 km	MPC · JPL
308118	2004 XM_{75}	—	December 9, 2004	Catalina	CSS	·	1.5 km	MPC · JPL
308119	2004 XG_{80}	—	December 10, 2004	Socorro	LINEAR	·	1.5 km	MPC · JPL
308120	2004 XL_{85}	—	December 12, 2004	Kitt Peak	Spacewatch	·	890 m	MPC · JPL
308121	2004 XB_{88}	—	December 9, 2004	Catalina	CSS	·	3.3 km	MPC · JPL
308122	2004 XT_{88}	—	December 10, 2004	Anderson Mesa	LONEOS	·	3.4 km	MPC · JPL
308123	2004 XP_{101}	—	December 14, 2004	Catalina	CSS	·	4.0 km	MPC · JPL
308124	2004 XN_{103}	—	December 9, 2004	Socorro	LINEAR	·	1.6 km	MPC · JPL
308125	2004 XX_{109}	—	December 13, 2004	Anderson Mesa	LONEOS	·	1.9 km	MPC · JPL
308126	2004 XV_{110}	—	December 14, 2004	Catalina	CSS	·	1.1 km	MPC · JPL
308127	2004 XM_{130}	—	December 14, 2004	Catalina	CSS	AMO +1km	1.1 km	MPC · JPL
308128	2004 XK_{133}	—	December 15, 2004	Socorro	LINEAR	·	1.3 km	MPC · JPL
308129	2004 XS_{139}	—	December 13, 2004	Kitt Peak	Spacewatch	·	1.8 km	MPC · JPL
308130	2004 XY_{139}	—	December 13, 2004	Kitt Peak	Spacewatch	·	1.2 km	MPC · JPL
308131	2004 XE_{147}	—	December 15, 2004	Socorro	LINEAR	PHO	1.8 km	MPC · JPL
308132	2004 XS_{173}	—	December 10, 2004	Socorro	LINEAR	(5)	3.1 km	MPC · JPL
308133	2004 XE_{184}	—	December 9, 2004	Kitt Peak	Spacewatch	·	920 m	MPC · JPL
308134	2004 XN_{191}	—	December 9, 2004	Catalina	CSS	·	1.4 km	MPC · JPL
308135	2004 YZ_{1}	—	December 19, 2004	Socorro	LINEAR	PHO	3.9 km	MPC · JPL
308136	2004 YY_{7}	—	December 18, 2004	Mount Lemmon	Mount Lemmon Survey	·	1.5 km	MPC · JPL
308137	2004 YM_{8}	—	December 18, 2004	Mount Lemmon	Mount Lemmon Survey	·	790 m	MPC · JPL
308138	2004 YM_{10}	—	December 18, 2004	Mount Lemmon	Mount Lemmon Survey	·	4.4 km	MPC · JPL
308139	2004 YW_{23}	—	December 18, 2004	Mount Lemmon	Mount Lemmon Survey	·	1.1 km	MPC · JPL
308140	2004 YT_{29}	—	December 16, 2004	Anderson Mesa	LONEOS	·	1.7 km	MPC · JPL
308141	2004 YK_{35}	—	December 18, 2004	Mount Lemmon	Mount Lemmon Survey	NYS	1.5 km	MPC · JPL
308142	2005 AR_{2}	—	January 6, 2005	Catalina	CSS	V	820 m	MPC · JPL
308143	2005 AY_{2}	—	January 6, 2005	Socorro	LINEAR	H	660 m	MPC · JPL
308144	2005 AR_{11}	—	January 6, 2005	Catalina	CSS	·	2.9 km	MPC · JPL
308145	2005 AU_{12}	—	January 6, 2005	Socorro	LINEAR	·	1.1 km	MPC · JPL
308146	2005 AA_{13}	—	January 7, 2005	Socorro	LINEAR	·	1.2 km	MPC · JPL
308147	2005 AU_{20}	—	January 6, 2005	Socorro	LINEAR	·	1.7 km	MPC · JPL
308148	2005 AY_{29}	—	January 8, 2005	Campo Imperatore	CINEOS	MAS	910 m	MPC · JPL
308149	2005 AK_{30}	—	January 9, 2005	Catalina	CSS	·	5.2 km	MPC · JPL
308150	2005 AA_{34}	—	January 13, 2005	Kitt Peak	Spacewatch	·	1.6 km	MPC · JPL
308151	2005 AX_{36}	—	January 13, 2005	Catalina	CSS	(2076)	1.1 km	MPC · JPL
308152	2005 AS_{37}	—	January 13, 2005	Kitt Peak	Spacewatch	·	1.4 km	MPC · JPL
308153	2005 AD_{39}	—	January 13, 2005	Kitt Peak	Spacewatch	NYS	1.2 km	MPC · JPL
308154	2005 AK_{39}	—	January 13, 2005	Socorro	LINEAR	·	1.0 km	MPC · JPL
308155	2005 AK_{44}	—	January 15, 2005	Socorro	LINEAR	·	1.4 km	MPC · JPL
308156	2005 AP_{51}	—	January 13, 2005	Kitt Peak	Spacewatch	·	1.7 km	MPC · JPL
308157	2005 AJ_{57}	—	January 15, 2005	Kitt Peak	Spacewatch	·	1.4 km	MPC · JPL
308158	2005 AY_{60}	—	January 15, 2005	Kitt Peak	Spacewatch	·	1.5 km	MPC · JPL
308159	2005 AS_{73}	—	January 15, 2005	Kitt Peak	Spacewatch	·	1.4 km	MPC · JPL
308160	2005 AK_{79}	—	January 15, 2005	Kitt Peak	Spacewatch	MAS	830 m	MPC · JPL
308161	2005 BZ_{4}	—	January 16, 2005	Socorro	LINEAR	·	2.7 km	MPC · JPL
308162	2005 BH_{8}	—	January 16, 2005	Socorro	LINEAR	·	1.6 km	MPC · JPL
308163	2005 BA_{11}	—	January 16, 2005	Kitt Peak	Spacewatch	·	1.2 km	MPC · JPL
308164	2005 BM_{17}	—	January 16, 2005	Kitt Peak	Spacewatch	MAS	730 m	MPC · JPL
308165	2005 BB_{19}	—	January 16, 2005	Socorro	LINEAR	·	1.0 km	MPC · JPL
308166	2005 BX_{19}	—	January 16, 2005	Socorro	LINEAR	·	1.7 km	MPC · JPL
308167	2005 BW_{20}	—	January 16, 2005	Kitt Peak	Spacewatch	·	1.1 km	MPC · JPL
308168	2005 BU_{21}	—	January 16, 2005	Kitt Peak	Spacewatch	·	1.4 km	MPC · JPL
308169	2005 BF_{23}	—	January 16, 2005	Kitt Peak	Spacewatch	NYS	1.8 km	MPC · JPL
308170	2005 BC_{30}	—	January 16, 2005	Mauna Kea	Veillet, C.	·	960 m	MPC · JPL
308171	2005 BQ_{41}	—	January 16, 2005	Mauna Kea	Veillet, C.	·	1.5 km	MPC · JPL
308172	2005 CH_{6}	—	February 1, 2005	Kitt Peak	Spacewatch	·	1.6 km	MPC · JPL
308173	2005 CN_{8}	—	February 1, 2005	Catalina	CSS	NYS	1.2 km	MPC · JPL
308174	2005 CX_{12}	—	February 2, 2005	Kitt Peak	Spacewatch	·	1.5 km	MPC · JPL
308175	2005 CD_{19}	—	February 2, 2005	Kitt Peak	Spacewatch	·	1.8 km	MPC · JPL
308176	2005 CY_{20}	—	February 2, 2005	Catalina	CSS	NYS	1.6 km	MPC · JPL
308177	2005 CJ_{26}	—	February 1, 2005	Palomar	NEAT	·	1.2 km	MPC · JPL
308178	2005 CK_{26}	—	February 1, 2005	Catalina	CSS	·	2.1 km	MPC · JPL
308179	2005 CS_{27}	—	February 2, 2005	Catalina	CSS	·	1.6 km	MPC · JPL
308180	2005 CQ_{29}	—	February 1, 2005	Kitt Peak	Spacewatch	MAS	800 m	MPC · JPL
308181	2005 CA_{31}	—	February 1, 2005	Kitt Peak	Spacewatch	·	1.5 km	MPC · JPL
308182	2005 CN_{38}	—	February 8, 2005	Gnosca	S. Sposetti	·	1.6 km	MPC · JPL
308183	2005 CQ_{39}	—	February 3, 2005	Socorro	LINEAR	·	1.3 km	MPC · JPL
308184	2005 CP_{41}	—	February 2, 2005	Kitt Peak	Spacewatch	·	1.3 km	MPC · JPL
308185	2005 CU_{41}	—	February 2, 2005	Kitt Peak	Spacewatch	·	1.6 km	MPC · JPL
308186	2005 CW_{43}	—	February 2, 2005	Catalina	CSS	·	1.8 km	MPC · JPL
308187	2005 CU_{48}	—	February 2, 2005	Catalina	CSS	·	1.6 km	MPC · JPL
308188	2005 CY_{57}	—	February 2, 2005	Catalina	CSS	NYS	1.4 km	MPC · JPL
308189	2005 CB_{60}	—	February 3, 2005	Socorro	LINEAR	·	1.5 km	MPC · JPL
308190	2005 CN_{60}	—	February 4, 2005	Kitt Peak	Spacewatch	·	1.2 km	MPC · JPL
308191	2005 CF_{62}	—	February 3, 2005	Calvin-Rehoboth	Calvin College	·	1.3 km	MPC · JPL
308192	2005 CZ_{66}	—	February 9, 2005	Socorro	LINEAR	·	1.5 km	MPC · JPL
308193	2005 CB_{79}	—	February 6, 2005	Palomar	Palomar	Haumea	238 km	MPC · JPL
308194	2005 ET_{12}	—	March 2, 2005	Catalina	CSS	·	1.8 km	MPC · JPL
308195	2005 EW_{12}	—	March 2, 2005	Catalina	CSS	·	1.1 km	MPC · JPL
308196	2005 EZ_{15}	—	March 3, 2005	Kitt Peak	Spacewatch	NYS	1.3 km	MPC · JPL
308197 Satrapi	2005 EV_{27}	Satrapi	March 3, 2005	Nogales	J.-C. Merlin	NYS	1.2 km	MPC · JPL
308198	2005 EK_{29}	—	March 3, 2005	Socorro	LINEAR	·	430 m	MPC · JPL
308199	2005 EY_{32}	—	March 4, 2005	Junk Bond	Junk Bond	NAE	3.8 km	MPC · JPL
308200	2005 EE_{36}	—	March 4, 2005	Catalina	CSS	·	1.8 km	MPC · JPL

== 308201–308300 ==
back to top

Designation			Discovery			Properties		Ref
Permanent	Provisional	Named after	Date	Site	Discoverer(s)	Category	Diam.	Ref
308201	2005 EO_{38}	—	March 3, 2005	Kitt Peak	Spacewatch	H	800 m	MPC · JPL
308202	2005 EH_{45}	—	March 3, 2005	Catalina	CSS	NYS	1.5 km	MPC · JPL
308203	2005 EC_{46}	—	March 3, 2005	Catalina	CSS	NYS	1.5 km	MPC · JPL
308204	2005 EW_{60}	—	March 4, 2005	Catalina	CSS	·	1.4 km	MPC · JPL
308205	2005 EO_{61}	—	March 4, 2005	Socorro	LINEAR	NYS	1.4 km	MPC · JPL
308206	2005 EY_{68}	—	March 7, 2005	Socorro	LINEAR	·	1.6 km	MPC · JPL
308207	2005 EO_{77}	—	March 3, 2005	Catalina	CSS	MAS	960 m	MPC · JPL
308208	2005 EP_{80}	—	March 4, 2005	Kitt Peak	Spacewatch	NYS	1.0 km	MPC · JPL
308209	2005 EV_{88}	—	March 8, 2005	Kitt Peak	Spacewatch	·	1.1 km	MPC · JPL
308210	2005 EL_{92}	—	March 8, 2005	Mount Lemmon	Mount Lemmon Survey	·	1.1 km	MPC · JPL
308211	2005 EG_{95}	—	March 9, 2005	Socorro	LINEAR	·	3.7 km	MPC · JPL
308212	2005 ED_{96}	—	March 3, 2005	Catalina	CSS	·	1.9 km	MPC · JPL
308213	2005 EL_{96}	—	March 3, 2005	Catalina	CSS	·	1.3 km	MPC · JPL
308214	2005 EU_{129}	—	March 9, 2005	Mount Lemmon	Mount Lemmon Survey	·	1.1 km	MPC · JPL
308215	2005 EZ_{136}	—	March 9, 2005	Mount Lemmon	Mount Lemmon Survey	·	2.1 km	MPC · JPL
308216	2005 EV_{140}	—	March 10, 2005	Mount Lemmon	Mount Lemmon Survey	·	2.9 km	MPC · JPL
308217	2005 EB_{144}	—	March 10, 2005	Mount Lemmon	Mount Lemmon Survey	·	1.2 km	MPC · JPL
308218	2005 EQ_{149}	—	March 10, 2005	Kitt Peak	Spacewatch	·	1.6 km	MPC · JPL
308219	2005 EW_{158}	—	March 9, 2005	Mount Lemmon	Mount Lemmon Survey	·	1.3 km	MPC · JPL
308220	2005 EQ_{160}	—	March 9, 2005	Mount Lemmon	Mount Lemmon Survey	·	1.3 km	MPC · JPL
308221	2005 EV_{162}	—	March 10, 2005	Mount Lemmon	Mount Lemmon Survey	NYS	1.2 km	MPC · JPL
308222	2005 EM_{166}	—	March 11, 2005	Mount Lemmon	Mount Lemmon Survey	·	1.5 km	MPC · JPL
308223	2005 EA_{206}	—	March 13, 2005	Catalina	CSS	·	920 m	MPC · JPL
308224	2005 EL_{210}	—	March 4, 2005	Kitt Peak	Spacewatch	·	1.3 km	MPC · JPL
308225	2005 EP_{232}	—	March 10, 2005	Mount Lemmon	Mount Lemmon Survey	·	1.8 km	MPC · JPL
308226	2005 EU_{233}	—	March 10, 2005	Anderson Mesa	LONEOS	·	2.5 km	MPC · JPL
308227	2005 EX_{239}	—	March 11, 2005	Kitt Peak	Spacewatch	·	1.0 km	MPC · JPL
308228	2005 EE_{250}	—	March 14, 2005	Catalina	CSS	PHO	1.4 km	MPC · JPL
308229	2005 ET_{252}	—	March 10, 2005	Mount Lemmon	Mount Lemmon Survey	·	2.0 km	MPC · JPL
308230	2005 ES_{257}	—	March 11, 2005	Mount Lemmon	Mount Lemmon Survey	·	1.6 km	MPC · JPL
308231	2005 EB_{258}	—	March 11, 2005	Mount Lemmon	Mount Lemmon Survey	·	1.8 km	MPC · JPL
308232	2005 EH_{260}	—	March 11, 2005	Kitt Peak	Spacewatch	·	1.3 km	MPC · JPL
308233	2005 EB_{261}	—	March 12, 2005	Socorro	LINEAR	·	1.8 km	MPC · JPL
308234	2005 EZ_{290}	—	March 10, 2005	Catalina	CSS	·	1.9 km	MPC · JPL
308235	2005 EA_{309}	—	March 9, 2005	Mount Lemmon	Mount Lemmon Survey	·	1.2 km	MPC · JPL
308236	2005 EB_{311}	—	March 10, 2005	Mount Lemmon	Mount Lemmon Survey	·	1.1 km	MPC · JPL
308237	2005 EU_{317}	—	March 12, 2005	Kitt Peak	M. W. Buie	·	1.5 km	MPC · JPL
308238	2005 EC_{328}	—	March 13, 2005	Catalina	CSS	·	1.2 km	MPC · JPL
308239	2005 FX_{12}	—	March 16, 2005	Catalina	CSS	JUN	1.4 km	MPC · JPL
308240	2005 GG_{5}	—	April 1, 2005	Kitt Peak	Spacewatch	MAR	1.2 km	MPC · JPL
308241	2005 GR_{12}	—	April 1, 2005	Anderson Mesa	LONEOS	·	1.3 km	MPC · JPL
308242	2005 GO_{21}	—	April 1, 2005	Siding Spring	SSS	ATE +1km · PHA	2.1 km	MPC · JPL
308243	2005 GC_{23}	—	April 1, 2005	Anderson Mesa	LONEOS	·	1.6 km	MPC · JPL
308244	2005 GB_{28}	—	April 3, 2005	Palomar	NEAT	·	1.8 km	MPC · JPL
308245	2005 GM_{41}	—	April 5, 2005	Mount Lemmon	Mount Lemmon Survey	·	1.5 km	MPC · JPL
308246	2005 GQ_{48}	—	April 5, 2005	Mount Lemmon	Mount Lemmon Survey	·	750 m	MPC · JPL
308247	2005 GC_{49}	—	April 5, 2005	Mount Lemmon	Mount Lemmon Survey	·	1.5 km	MPC · JPL
308248	2005 GU_{49}	—	April 5, 2005	Mount Lemmon	Mount Lemmon Survey	·	2.1 km	MPC · JPL
308249	2005 GR_{59}	—	April 6, 2005	Mayhill	Lowe, A.	·	2.8 km	MPC · JPL
308250	2005 GC_{60}	—	April 9, 2005	Catalina	CSS	PHO	2.3 km	MPC · JPL
308251	2005 GT_{68}	—	April 2, 2005	Catalina	CSS	MAR	1.5 km	MPC · JPL
308252	2005 GQ_{71}	—	March 11, 2005	Kitt Peak	Spacewatch	·	2.6 km	MPC · JPL
308253	2005 GC_{74}	—	April 4, 2005	Catalina	CSS	EUN	1.8 km	MPC · JPL
308254	2005 GN_{74}	—	April 5, 2005	Catalina	CSS	·	1.7 km	MPC · JPL
308255	2005 GT_{76}	—	April 5, 2005	Mount Lemmon	Mount Lemmon Survey	WIT	860 m	MPC · JPL
308256	2005 GT_{77}	—	April 6, 2005	Catalina	CSS	·	2.4 km	MPC · JPL
308257	2005 GP_{80}	—	April 7, 2005	Kitt Peak	Spacewatch	·	1.4 km	MPC · JPL
308258	2005 GO_{86}	—	April 4, 2005	Socorro	LINEAR	·	2.5 km	MPC · JPL
308259	2005 GG_{90}	—	March 17, 2005	Mount Lemmon	Mount Lemmon Survey	·	1.2 km	MPC · JPL
308260	2005 GQ_{90}	—	April 6, 2005	Kitt Peak	Spacewatch	·	1.6 km	MPC · JPL
308261	2005 GZ_{93}	—	April 6, 2005	Catalina	CSS	·	2.4 km	MPC · JPL
308262	2005 GE_{99}	—	April 7, 2005	Kitt Peak	Spacewatch	·	1.4 km	MPC · JPL
308263	2005 GB_{100}	—	April 9, 2005	Kitt Peak	Spacewatch	·	1.2 km	MPC · JPL
308264	2005 GW_{105}	—	April 10, 2005	Kitt Peak	Spacewatch	(5)	1.4 km	MPC · JPL
308265	2005 GX_{117}	—	April 11, 2005	Mount Lemmon	Mount Lemmon Survey	·	2.2 km	MPC · JPL
308266	2005 GM_{119}	—	April 9, 2005	Siding Spring	SSS	·	2.1 km	MPC · JPL
308267	2005 GP_{122}	—	April 6, 2005	Mount Lemmon	Mount Lemmon Survey	·	1.1 km	MPC · JPL
308268	2005 GF_{123}	—	April 6, 2005	Mount Lemmon	Mount Lemmon Survey	·	3.0 km	MPC · JPL
308269	2005 GL_{127}	—	April 12, 2005	Anderson Mesa	LONEOS	·	2.5 km	MPC · JPL
308270	2005 GU_{150}	—	April 11, 2005	Kitt Peak	Spacewatch	AGN	1.4 km	MPC · JPL
308271	2005 GT_{151}	—	April 12, 2005	Kitt Peak	Spacewatch	·	2.1 km	MPC · JPL
308272	2005 GT_{152}	—	April 13, 2005	Anderson Mesa	LONEOS	·	2.6 km	MPC · JPL
308273	2005 GL_{156}	—	April 10, 2005	Mount Lemmon	Mount Lemmon Survey	·	2.4 km	MPC · JPL
308274	2005 GR_{159}	—	April 12, 2005	Kitt Peak	Spacewatch	·	3.3 km	MPC · JPL
308275	2005 GT_{165}	—	April 11, 2005	Anderson Mesa	LONEOS	·	1.1 km	MPC · JPL
308276	2005 GU_{169}	—	April 12, 2005	Kitt Peak	Spacewatch	MAS	900 m	MPC · JPL
308277	2005 GC_{179}	—	April 12, 2005	Anderson Mesa	LONEOS	·	1.8 km	MPC · JPL
308278	2005 GY_{200}	—	March 11, 2005	Kitt Peak	Spacewatch	·	1.3 km	MPC · JPL
308279	2005 GL_{202}	—	April 5, 2005	Kitt Peak	Spacewatch	EUN	1.4 km	MPC · JPL
308280	2005 GU_{208}	—	April 1, 2005	Catalina	CSS	MAR	1.3 km	MPC · JPL
308281	2005 GK_{209}	—	April 6, 2005	Catalina	CSS	·	2.0 km	MPC · JPL
308282	2005 GM_{209}	—	April 6, 2005	Catalina	CSS	·	1.8 km	MPC · JPL
308283	2005 HG_{8}	—	April 30, 2005	Anderson Mesa	LONEOS	·	4.2 km	MPC · JPL
308284	2005 JP_{2}	—	May 3, 2005	Kitt Peak	Spacewatch	·	1.3 km	MPC · JPL
308285	2005 JW_{13}	—	May 1, 2005	Palomar	NEAT	JUN	1.3 km	MPC · JPL
308286	2005 JX_{15}	—	May 3, 2005	Kitt Peak	Spacewatch	·	2.2 km	MPC · JPL
308287	2005 JA_{34}	—	May 4, 2005	Palomar	NEAT	EUN	1.5 km	MPC · JPL
308288	2005 JB_{38}	—	May 6, 2005	Socorro	LINEAR	·	1.6 km	MPC · JPL
308289	2005 JU_{48}	—	May 3, 2005	Kitt Peak	Spacewatch	·	1.3 km	MPC · JPL
308290	2005 JE_{51}	—	May 4, 2005	Kitt Peak	Spacewatch	MRX	1.1 km	MPC · JPL
308291	2005 JD_{56}	—	May 6, 2005	Kitt Peak	Spacewatch	·	1.9 km	MPC · JPL
308292	2005 JC_{82}	—	May 9, 2005	Catalina	CSS	·	1.5 km	MPC · JPL
308293	2005 JE_{83}	—	May 8, 2005	Kitt Peak	Spacewatch	·	1.7 km	MPC · JPL
308294	2005 JB_{89}	—	May 11, 2005	Anderson Mesa	LONEOS	·	1.6 km	MPC · JPL
308295	2005 JN_{99}	—	May 9, 2005	Kitt Peak	Spacewatch	·	1.7 km	MPC · JPL
308296	2005 JA_{103}	—	May 9, 2005	Catalina	CSS	·	2.9 km	MPC · JPL
308297	2005 JG_{113}	—	May 10, 2005	Kitt Peak	Spacewatch	·	1.8 km	MPC · JPL
308298	2005 JH_{130}	—	May 13, 2005	Socorro	LINEAR	·	1.6 km	MPC · JPL
308299	2005 JM_{137}	—	May 13, 2005	Kitt Peak	Spacewatch	·	2.4 km	MPC · JPL
308300	2005 JH_{146}	—	May 14, 2005	Socorro	LINEAR	EUN	1.3 km	MPC · JPL

== 308301–308400 ==
back to top

Designation			Discovery			Properties		Ref
Permanent	Provisional	Named after	Date	Site	Discoverer(s)	Category	Diam.	Ref
308301	2005 JJ_{147}	—	May 15, 2005	Mount Lemmon	Mount Lemmon Survey	·	2.8 km	MPC · JPL
308302	2005 JD_{148}	—	August 14, 2001	Palomar	NEAT	·	2.7 km	MPC · JPL
308303	2005 JG_{163}	—	May 8, 2005	Mount Lemmon	Mount Lemmon Survey	·	3.0 km	MPC · JPL
308304	2005 JH_{165}	—	May 10, 2005	Kitt Peak	Spacewatch	HNS	1.7 km	MPC · JPL
308305	2005 KA_{1}	—	May 16, 2005	Kitt Peak	Spacewatch	·	1.0 km	MPC · JPL
308306 Dainere	2005 KL_{8}	Dainere	May 19, 2005	Siding Spring	SSS	T_{j} (2.85)	3.2 km	MPC · JPL
308307	2005 KT_{9}	—	May 29, 2005	Reedy Creek	J. Broughton	ADE	2.5 km	MPC · JPL
308308	2005 KB_{14}	—	May 19, 2005	Mount Lemmon	Mount Lemmon Survey	·	1.6 km	MPC · JPL
308309	2005 LV_{8}	—	June 1, 2005	Kitt Peak	Spacewatch	·	2.1 km	MPC · JPL
308310	2005 LT_{9}	—	June 1, 2005	Kitt Peak	Spacewatch	·	2.3 km	MPC · JPL
308311	2005 LJ_{13}	—	June 4, 2005	Kitt Peak	Spacewatch	·	2.9 km	MPC · JPL
308312	2005 LU_{23}	—	June 11, 2005	Kitt Peak	Spacewatch	·	3.5 km	MPC · JPL
308313	2005 LV_{36}	—	June 13, 2005	Kitt Peak	Spacewatch	EUN	1.7 km	MPC · JPL
308314	2005 LZ_{45}	—	June 13, 2005	Kitt Peak	Spacewatch	L4	15 km	MPC · JPL
308315	2005 LZ_{52}	—	June 8, 2005	Siding Spring	SSS	T_{j} (2.95)	5.6 km	MPC · JPL
308316	2005 LD_{53}	—	June 7, 2005	Siding Spring	SSS	·	3.7 km	MPC · JPL
308317	2005 MS_{11}	—	June 27, 2005	Kitt Peak	Spacewatch	·	2.4 km	MPC · JPL
308318	2005 MC_{18}	—	June 27, 2005	Kitt Peak	Spacewatch	·	4.4 km	MPC · JPL
308319	2005 MN_{22}	—	June 30, 2005	Kitt Peak	Spacewatch	KOR	1.5 km	MPC · JPL
308320	2005 MK_{29}	—	June 29, 2005	Kitt Peak	Spacewatch	TRE	4.0 km	MPC · JPL
308321	2005 MG_{38}	—	June 30, 2005	Kitt Peak	Spacewatch	·	1.8 km	MPC · JPL
308322	2005 MU_{38}	—	June 30, 2005	Kitt Peak	Spacewatch	KOR	1.6 km	MPC · JPL
308323	2005 MW_{41}	—	June 30, 2005	Palomar	NEAT	·	3.1 km	MPC · JPL
308324	2005 NG_{4}	—	July 2, 2005	Kitt Peak	Spacewatch	GEF	1.8 km	MPC · JPL
308325	2005 NS_{4}	—	July 3, 2005	Mount Lemmon	Mount Lemmon Survey	·	2.5 km	MPC · JPL
308326	2005 NJ_{17}	—	July 3, 2005	Mount Lemmon	Mount Lemmon Survey	·	1.5 km	MPC · JPL
308327	2005 NV_{17}	—	July 4, 2005	Kitt Peak	Spacewatch	·	2.2 km	MPC · JPL
308328	2005 NZ_{30}	—	July 4, 2005	Mount Lemmon	Mount Lemmon Survey	KOR	1.5 km	MPC · JPL
308329	2005 ND_{35}	—	July 5, 2005	Kitt Peak	Spacewatch	GEF	1.7 km	MPC · JPL
308330	2005 NK_{52}	—	July 10, 2005	Catalina	CSS	NYS	2.3 km	MPC · JPL
308331	2005 NZ_{61}	—	July 11, 2005	Kitt Peak	Spacewatch	·	2.3 km	MPC · JPL
308332	2005 NT_{68}	—	July 3, 2005	Mount Lemmon	Mount Lemmon Survey	AGN	1.4 km	MPC · JPL
308333	2005 NY_{75}	—	July 10, 2005	Kitt Peak	Spacewatch	·	1.7 km	MPC · JPL
308334	2005 NN_{99}	—	July 10, 2005	Kitt Peak	Spacewatch	·	2.7 km	MPC · JPL
308335	2005 OE_{18}	—	July 30, 2005	Palomar	NEAT	V	800 m	MPC · JPL
308336	2005 OW_{31}	—	July 29, 2005	Siding Spring	SSS	·	3.0 km	MPC · JPL
308337	2005 OY_{31}	—	July 30, 2005	Palomar	NEAT	·	3.2 km	MPC · JPL
308338	2005 PN_{16}	—	August 5, 2005	Palomar	NEAT	·	3.6 km	MPC · JPL
308339	2005 PP_{20}	—	August 15, 2005	Siding Spring	SSS	·	2.1 km	MPC · JPL
308340	2005 PB_{24}	—	August 9, 2005	Cerro Tololo	M. W. Buie	THM	2.8 km	MPC · JPL
308341	2005 QM_{5}	—	August 22, 2005	Palomar	NEAT	LIX	3.8 km	MPC · JPL
308342	2005 QK_{6}	—	August 24, 2005	Palomar	NEAT	·	3.0 km	MPC · JPL
308343	2005 QE_{8}	—	August 24, 2005	Palomar	NEAT	·	3.3 km	MPC · JPL
308344	2005 QP_{9}	—	July 29, 2005	Palomar	NEAT	·	1.9 km	MPC · JPL
308345	2005 QO_{26}	—	August 27, 2005	Kitt Peak	Spacewatch	·	3.3 km	MPC · JPL
308346	2005 QC_{36}	—	August 25, 2005	Palomar	NEAT	·	4.2 km	MPC · JPL
308347	2005 QY_{47}	—	August 26, 2005	Palomar	NEAT	HYG	3.3 km	MPC · JPL
308348	2005 QD_{58}	—	August 25, 2005	Palomar	NEAT	EOS	2.0 km	MPC · JPL
308349	2005 QQ_{61}	—	August 26, 2005	Palomar	NEAT	·	3.0 km	MPC · JPL
308350	2005 QE_{70}	—	August 29, 2005	Anderson Mesa	LONEOS	·	3.5 km	MPC · JPL
308351	2005 QG_{75}	—	August 27, 2005	Anderson Mesa	LONEOS	·	2.7 km	MPC · JPL
308352	2005 QO_{75}	—	August 28, 2005	St. Véran	St. Veran	·	2.9 km	MPC · JPL
308353	2005 QX_{81}	—	August 29, 2005	Socorro	LINEAR	·	1.3 km	MPC · JPL
308354	2005 QW_{85}	—	August 30, 2005	Anderson Mesa	LONEOS	·	1.6 km	MPC · JPL
308355	2005 QK_{86}	—	August 30, 2005	Kitt Peak	Spacewatch	HYG	3.1 km	MPC · JPL
308356	2005 QZ_{88}	—	August 30, 2005	Socorro	LINEAR	·	2.2 km	MPC · JPL
308357	2005 QR_{115}	—	August 28, 2005	Kitt Peak	Spacewatch	·	1.7 km	MPC · JPL
308358	2005 QP_{120}	—	August 28, 2005	Kitt Peak	Spacewatch	KOR	1.5 km	MPC · JPL
308359	2005 QM_{138}	—	August 28, 2005	Kitt Peak	Spacewatch	·	3.7 km	MPC · JPL
308360	2005 QY_{148}	—	August 31, 2005	Campo Imperatore	CINEOS	MAR	1.2 km	MPC · JPL
308361	2005 QD_{149}	—	August 30, 2005	Anderson Mesa	LONEOS	TIR	4.0 km	MPC · JPL
308362	2005 QM_{151}	—	August 30, 2005	Kitt Peak	Spacewatch	EOS	2.0 km	MPC · JPL
308363	2005 QF_{164}	—	August 31, 2005	Palomar	NEAT	·	3.6 km	MPC · JPL
308364	2005 QO_{164}	—	August 31, 2005	Palomar	NEAT	·	2.5 km	MPC · JPL
308365	2005 QS_{164}	—	August 31, 2005	Palomar	NEAT	·	3.0 km	MPC · JPL
308366	2005 QR_{167}	—	August 27, 2005	Palomar	NEAT	LIX	4.5 km	MPC · JPL
308367	2005 QR_{176}	—	August 30, 2005	Anderson Mesa	LONEOS	H	930 m	MPC · JPL
308368	2005 QG_{177}	—	August 27, 2005	Palomar	NEAT	·	2.9 km	MPC · JPL
308369	2005 QJ_{178}	—	August 26, 2005	Palomar	NEAT	·	2.9 km	MPC · JPL
308370	2005 QQ_{179}	—	August 26, 2005	Palomar	NEAT	·	3.9 km	MPC · JPL
308371	2005 QG_{189}	—	August 31, 2005	Kitt Peak	Spacewatch	·	3.0 km	MPC · JPL
308372	2005 RW_{7}	—	September 8, 2005	Socorro	LINEAR	·	3.8 km	MPC · JPL
308373	2005 RO_{15}	—	September 1, 2005	Kitt Peak	Spacewatch	·	3.0 km	MPC · JPL
308374	2005 RQ_{19}	—	September 1, 2005	Kitt Peak	Spacewatch	·	2.3 km	MPC · JPL
308375	2005 RS_{23}	—	September 10, 2005	Anderson Mesa	LONEOS	·	2.9 km	MPC · JPL
308376	2005 RA_{26}	—	September 11, 2005	Goodricke-Pigott	R. A. Tucker	EOS	2.7 km	MPC · JPL
308377	2005 RM_{30}	—	September 10, 2005	Anderson Mesa	LONEOS	·	1.6 km	MPC · JPL
308378	2005 RR_{31}	—	September 13, 2005	Anderson Mesa	LONEOS	·	3.9 km	MPC · JPL
308379	2005 RS_{43}	—	September 13, 2005	Apache Point	A. C. Becker, Puckett, A. W., Kubica, J.	twotino	228 km	MPC · JPL
308380	2005 RY_{45}	—	September 14, 2005	Apache Point	A. C. Becker	EOS	2.3 km	MPC · JPL
308381	2005 SJ_{1}	—	September 23, 2005	Kitt Peak	Spacewatch	EUP	4.7 km	MPC · JPL
308382	2005 SM_{2}	—	September 23, 2005	Kitt Peak	Spacewatch	·	3.2 km	MPC · JPL
308383	2005 SF_{6}	—	September 23, 2005	Kitt Peak	Spacewatch	·	2.9 km	MPC · JPL
308384	2005 SV_{7}	—	September 25, 2005	Catalina	CSS	·	3.5 km	MPC · JPL
308385	2005 SU_{14}	—	September 25, 2005	Catalina	CSS	·	4.2 km	MPC · JPL
308386	2005 SH_{21}	—	September 26, 2005	Palomar	NEAT	·	4.3 km	MPC · JPL
308387	2005 SW_{21}	—	September 28, 2005	Great Shefford	Birtwhistle, P.	·	3.4 km	MPC · JPL
308388	2005 SN_{22}	—	September 23, 2005	Kitt Peak	Spacewatch	HYG	3.8 km	MPC · JPL
308389	2005 SY_{22}	—	September 23, 2005	Kitt Peak	Spacewatch	EOS	3.0 km	MPC · JPL
308390	2005 SO_{29}	—	September 23, 2005	Kitt Peak	Spacewatch	VER	3.5 km	MPC · JPL
308391	2005 SZ_{34}	—	September 23, 2005	Kitt Peak	Spacewatch	·	2.9 km	MPC · JPL
308392	2005 SB_{35}	—	September 23, 2005	Kitt Peak	Spacewatch	·	3.3 km	MPC · JPL
308393	2005 SP_{38}	—	September 24, 2005	Kitt Peak	Spacewatch	·	2.3 km	MPC · JPL
308394	2005 SD_{44}	—	September 24, 2005	Kitt Peak	Spacewatch	·	3.9 km	MPC · JPL
308395	2005 SO_{46}	—	September 24, 2005	Kitt Peak	Spacewatch	(31811)	3.3 km	MPC · JPL
308396	2005 SF_{48}	—	September 24, 2005	Kitt Peak	Spacewatch	·	2.8 km	MPC · JPL
308397	2005 SJ_{48}	—	September 24, 2005	Kitt Peak	Spacewatch	·	3.0 km	MPC · JPL
308398	2005 ST_{49}	—	September 24, 2005	Kitt Peak	Spacewatch	·	5.3 km	MPC · JPL
308399	2005 SZ_{55}	—	September 25, 2005	Kitt Peak	Spacewatch	·	5.3 km	MPC · JPL
308400	2005 SG_{60}	—	September 26, 2005	Kitt Peak	Spacewatch	·	1.3 km	MPC · JPL

== 308401–308500 ==
back to top

Designation			Discovery			Properties		Ref
Permanent	Provisional	Named after	Date	Site	Discoverer(s)	Category	Diam.	Ref
308401	2005 SF_{62}	—	September 26, 2005	Kitt Peak	Spacewatch	THM	2.5 km	MPC · JPL
308402	2005 SL_{76}	—	September 24, 2005	Kitt Peak	Spacewatch	·	2.6 km	MPC · JPL
308403	2005 SV_{78}	—	September 24, 2005	Kitt Peak	Spacewatch	·	2.2 km	MPC · JPL
308404	2005 SC_{83}	—	September 24, 2005	Kitt Peak	Spacewatch	·	2.7 km	MPC · JPL
308405	2005 SW_{83}	—	September 24, 2005	Kitt Peak	Spacewatch	·	2.3 km	MPC · JPL
308406	2005 SR_{84}	—	September 24, 2005	Kitt Peak	Spacewatch	THM	2.1 km	MPC · JPL
308407	2005 SM_{85}	—	September 24, 2005	Kitt Peak	Spacewatch	EOS	2.2 km	MPC · JPL
308408	2005 SY_{92}	—	September 24, 2005	Kitt Peak	Spacewatch	V	680 m	MPC · JPL
308409	2005 SY_{93}	—	September 24, 2005	Kitt Peak	Spacewatch	·	3.1 km	MPC · JPL
308410	2005 SP_{95}	—	April 9, 2003	Palomar	NEAT	VER	3.8 km	MPC · JPL
308411	2005 SM_{98}	—	September 25, 2005	Kitt Peak	Spacewatch	·	3.1 km	MPC · JPL
308412	2005 ST_{103}	—	September 25, 2005	Palomar	NEAT	·	1.3 km	MPC · JPL
308413	2005 SL_{105}	—	September 25, 2005	Kitt Peak	Spacewatch	EUN ·	1.5 km	MPC · JPL
308414	2005 SY_{108}	—	September 26, 2005	Kitt Peak	Spacewatch	·	3.8 km	MPC · JPL
308415	2005 SC_{112}	—	September 26, 2005	Palomar	NEAT	·	3.8 km	MPC · JPL
308416	2005 SZ_{113}	—	September 27, 2005	Kitt Peak	Spacewatch	·	1.0 km	MPC · JPL
308417	2005 SH_{114}	—	September 27, 2005	Kitt Peak	Spacewatch	·	1.7 km	MPC · JPL
308418	2005 SP_{117}	—	September 28, 2005	Palomar	NEAT	HYG	3.2 km	MPC · JPL
308419	2005 SZ_{120}	—	September 29, 2005	Kitt Peak	Spacewatch	VER	5.7 km	MPC · JPL
308420	2005 SO_{125}	—	September 29, 2005	Mount Lemmon	Mount Lemmon Survey	·	4.9 km	MPC · JPL
308421	2005 SZ_{126}	—	September 29, 2005	Mount Lemmon	Mount Lemmon Survey	THM	2.2 km	MPC · JPL
308422	2005 SU_{127}	—	September 29, 2005	Mount Lemmon	Mount Lemmon Survey	THM	2.4 km	MPC · JPL
308423	2005 SV_{127}	—	September 29, 2005	Mount Lemmon	Mount Lemmon Survey	·	4.5 km	MPC · JPL
308424	2005 SG_{129}	—	September 29, 2005	Anderson Mesa	LONEOS	·	4.0 km	MPC · JPL
308425	2005 SO_{135}	—	September 24, 2005	Kitt Peak	Spacewatch	·	3.0 km	MPC · JPL
308426	2005 SF_{139}	—	September 25, 2005	Kitt Peak	Spacewatch	THM	2.2 km	MPC · JPL
308427	2005 SJ_{139}	—	September 25, 2005	Kitt Peak	Spacewatch	·	3.3 km	MPC · JPL
308428	2005 SP_{139}	—	September 25, 2005	Kitt Peak	Spacewatch	·	2.2 km	MPC · JPL
308429	2005 SP_{141}	—	September 25, 2005	Kitt Peak	Spacewatch	HYG	3.1 km	MPC · JPL
308430	2005 SH_{144}	—	September 25, 2005	Kitt Peak	Spacewatch	·	3.4 km	MPC · JPL
308431	2005 SK_{155}	—	September 26, 2005	Palomar	NEAT	EUN	1.5 km	MPC · JPL
308432	2005 SS_{155}	—	September 26, 2005	Palomar	NEAT	·	3.7 km	MPC · JPL
308433	2005 SJ_{157}	—	September 26, 2005	Kitt Peak	Spacewatch	·	3.6 km	MPC · JPL
308434	2005 ST_{157}	—	September 26, 2005	Kitt Peak	Spacewatch	·	3.6 km	MPC · JPL
308435	2005 SL_{159}	—	September 26, 2005	Kitt Peak	Spacewatch	V	940 m	MPC · JPL
308436	2005 SC_{163}	—	September 27, 2005	Kitt Peak	Spacewatch	·	1.2 km	MPC · JPL
308437	2005 SH_{163}	—	September 27, 2005	Kitt Peak	Spacewatch	·	2.4 km	MPC · JPL
308438	2005 SG_{176}	—	September 29, 2005	Kitt Peak	Spacewatch	·	3.3 km	MPC · JPL
308439	2005 SW_{180}	—	September 29, 2005	Palomar	NEAT	THM	2.6 km	MPC · JPL
308440	2005 SB_{183}	—	September 29, 2005	Kitt Peak	Spacewatch	·	3.4 km	MPC · JPL
308441	2005 SL_{183}	—	September 29, 2005	Kitt Peak	Spacewatch	·	3.7 km	MPC · JPL
308442	2005 SA_{190}	—	September 29, 2005	Anderson Mesa	LONEOS	·	4.2 km	MPC · JPL
308443	2005 SD_{195}	—	September 30, 2005	Mount Lemmon	Mount Lemmon Survey	H	740 m	MPC · JPL
308444	2005 SF_{198}	—	September 30, 2005	Mount Lemmon	Mount Lemmon Survey	·	2.5 km	MPC · JPL
308445	2005 SK_{208}	—	September 30, 2005	Kitt Peak	Spacewatch	·	2.8 km	MPC · JPL
308446	2005 SQ_{211}	—	September 30, 2005	Mount Lemmon	Mount Lemmon Survey	THM	2.3 km	MPC · JPL
308447	2005 SB_{214}	—	September 30, 2005	Anderson Mesa	LONEOS	·	5.0 km	MPC · JPL
308448	2005 SG_{229}	—	September 30, 2005	Mount Lemmon	Mount Lemmon Survey	·	3.0 km	MPC · JPL
308449	2005 SK_{229}	—	September 30, 2005	Mount Lemmon	Mount Lemmon Survey	·	2.7 km	MPC · JPL
308450	2005 SN_{242}	—	September 30, 2005	Kitt Peak	Spacewatch	·	2.8 km	MPC · JPL
308451	2005 SC_{243}	—	September 30, 2005	Mount Lemmon	Mount Lemmon Survey	HYG	2.9 km	MPC · JPL
308452	2005 SC_{247}	—	September 30, 2005	Kitt Peak	Spacewatch	(1298)	2.9 km	MPC · JPL
308453	2005 SB_{253}	—	September 24, 2005	Palomar	NEAT	·	1.3 km	MPC · JPL
308454	2005 SF_{256}	—	September 22, 2005	Palomar	NEAT	·	2.8 km	MPC · JPL
308455	2005 SO_{270}	—	September 30, 2005	Anderson Mesa	LONEOS	·	3.4 km	MPC · JPL
308456	2005 SK_{271}	—	September 30, 2005	Mount Lemmon	Mount Lemmon Survey	·	2.9 km	MPC · JPL
308457	2005 SB_{273}	—	September 30, 2005	Palomar	NEAT	·	2.6 km	MPC · JPL
308458	2005 SJ_{273}	—	September 27, 2005	Kitt Peak	Spacewatch	·	2.9 km	MPC · JPL
308459	2005 SL_{277}	—	September 30, 2005	Mount Lemmon	Mount Lemmon Survey	·	3.1 km	MPC · JPL
308460	2005 SC_{278}	—	September 22, 2005	Apache Point	A. C. Becker, Puckett, A. W., Kubica, J.	res · 4:5	129 km	MPC · JPL
308461	2005 SZ_{284}	—	September 25, 2005	Apache Point	A. C. Becker	·	4.2 km	MPC · JPL
308462	2005 SU_{286}	—	September 26, 2005	Apache Point	A. C. Becker	·	3.1 km	MPC · JPL
308463	2005 SD_{287}	—	September 26, 2005	Apache Point	A. C. Becker	·	3.5 km	MPC · JPL
308464	2005 SB_{289}	—	September 30, 2005	Apache Point	A. C. Becker	·	7.0 km	MPC · JPL
308465	2005 SF_{289}	—	September 23, 2005	Kitt Peak	Spacewatch	·	2.9 km	MPC · JPL
308466	2005 SN_{289}	—	September 26, 2005	Palomar	NEAT	·	3.6 km	MPC · JPL
308467	2005 TN_{2}	—	October 1, 2005	Catalina	CSS	·	3.8 km	MPC · JPL
308468	2005 TB_{4}	—	October 1, 2005	Anderson Mesa	LONEOS	URS	3.9 km	MPC · JPL
308469	2005 TP_{7}	—	October 1, 2005	Kitt Peak	Spacewatch	THM	2.7 km	MPC · JPL
308470	2005 TG_{10}	—	October 2, 2005	Palomar	NEAT	·	5.0 km	MPC · JPL
308471	2005 TZ_{10}	—	October 2, 2005	Mount Lemmon	Mount Lemmon Survey	·	2.6 km	MPC · JPL
308472	2005 TB_{16}	—	October 1, 2005	Kitt Peak	Spacewatch	·	2.6 km	MPC · JPL
308473	2005 TB_{28}	—	October 1, 2005	Kitt Peak	Spacewatch	·	3.2 km	MPC · JPL
308474	2005 TU_{29}	—	October 3, 2005	Catalina	CSS	·	4.8 km	MPC · JPL
308475	2005 TJ_{36}	—	October 1, 2005	Catalina	CSS	fast	2.7 km	MPC · JPL
308476	2005 TA_{41}	—	October 2, 2005	Anderson Mesa	LONEOS	·	4.0 km	MPC · JPL
308477	2005 TE_{44}	—	October 5, 2005	Mount Lemmon	Mount Lemmon Survey	THM · fast	2.5 km	MPC · JPL
308478	2005 TJ_{61}	—	October 3, 2005	Catalina	CSS	·	2.9 km	MPC · JPL
308479	2005 TN_{61}	—	October 3, 2005	Catalina	CSS	·	3.3 km	MPC · JPL
308480	2005 TV_{61}	—	October 3, 2005	Kitt Peak	Spacewatch	CYB	6.4 km	MPC · JPL
308481	2005 TG_{74}	—	October 7, 2005	Anderson Mesa	LONEOS	URS	4.7 km	MPC · JPL
308482	2005 TC_{75}	—	October 1, 2005	Mount Lemmon	Mount Lemmon Survey	·	4.0 km	MPC · JPL
308483	2005 TR_{77}	—	October 6, 2005	Catalina	CSS	·	1.9 km	MPC · JPL
308484	2005 TV_{78}	—	October 7, 2005	Catalina	CSS	·	1.7 km	MPC · JPL
308485	2005 TR_{81}	—	October 3, 2005	Kitt Peak	Spacewatch	HYG	2.4 km	MPC · JPL
308486	2005 TE_{87}	—	October 5, 2005	Kitt Peak	Spacewatch	·	3.7 km	MPC · JPL
308487	2005 TV_{91}	—	October 6, 2005	Catalina	CSS	V	920 m	MPC · JPL
308488	2005 TG_{95}	—	October 6, 2005	Kitt Peak	Spacewatch	·	3.8 km	MPC · JPL
308489	2005 TY_{101}	—	October 7, 2005	Mount Lemmon	Mount Lemmon Survey	·	2.6 km	MPC · JPL
308490	2005 TL_{102}	—	October 7, 2005	Mount Lemmon	Mount Lemmon Survey	·	3.6 km	MPC · JPL
308491	2005 TR_{105}	—	October 9, 2005	Kitt Peak	Spacewatch	·	4.1 km	MPC · JPL
308492	2005 TX_{106}	—	October 4, 2005	Mount Lemmon	Mount Lemmon Survey	·	3.0 km	MPC · JPL
308493	2005 TA_{110}	—	October 7, 2005	Kitt Peak	Spacewatch	VER	2.9 km	MPC · JPL
308494	2005 TQ_{110}	—	October 7, 2005	Kitt Peak	Spacewatch	·	2.6 km	MPC · JPL
308495	2005 TP_{111}	—	September 27, 2005	Kitt Peak	Spacewatch	VER	3.2 km	MPC · JPL
308496	2005 TB_{122}	—	October 7, 2005	Kitt Peak	Spacewatch	·	3.3 km	MPC · JPL
308497	2005 TG_{124}	—	October 7, 2005	Kitt Peak	Spacewatch	·	1.2 km	MPC · JPL
308498	2005 TY_{129}	—	October 7, 2005	Kitt Peak	Spacewatch	THM	2.3 km	MPC · JPL
308499	2005 TQ_{132}	—	October 7, 2005	Kitt Peak	Spacewatch	·	3.1 km	MPC · JPL
308500	2005 TT_{143}	—	October 8, 2005	Kitt Peak	Spacewatch	·	3.5 km	MPC · JPL

== 308501–308600 ==
back to top

Designation			Discovery			Properties		Ref
Permanent	Provisional	Named after	Date	Site	Discoverer(s)	Category	Diam.	Ref
308501	2005 TN_{158}	—	October 9, 2005	Kitt Peak	Spacewatch	·	3.7 km	MPC · JPL
308502	2005 TW_{171}	—	October 10, 2005	Catalina	CSS	·	4.8 km	MPC · JPL
308503	2005 TN_{175}	—	October 3, 2005	Catalina	CSS	·	4.0 km	MPC · JPL
308504	2005 TB_{181}	—	October 1, 2005	Kitt Peak	Spacewatch	·	2.5 km	MPC · JPL
308505	2005 TN_{185}	—	October 4, 2005	Mount Lemmon	Mount Lemmon Survey	·	2.8 km	MPC · JPL
308506	2005 TL_{193}	—	October 5, 2005	Catalina	CSS	·	4.3 km	MPC · JPL
308507	2005 US_{7}	—	October 26, 2005	Ottmarsheim	C. Rinner	·	3.8 km	MPC · JPL
308508	2005 UH_{14}	—	October 22, 2005	Kitt Peak	Spacewatch	·	3.4 km	MPC · JPL
308509	2005 UF_{19}	—	October 22, 2005	Catalina	CSS	·	3.8 km	MPC · JPL
308510	2005 UH_{19}	—	October 22, 2005	Catalina	CSS	T_{j} (2.99) · EUP	3.9 km	MPC · JPL
308511	2005 UL_{19}	—	October 22, 2005	Catalina	CSS	HYG	3.2 km	MPC · JPL
308512	2005 UO_{27}	—	October 23, 2005	Catalina	CSS	·	4.3 km	MPC · JPL
308513	2005 UB_{33}	—	October 24, 2005	Kitt Peak	Spacewatch	·	3.6 km	MPC · JPL
308514	2005 UM_{34}	—	October 24, 2005	Kitt Peak	Spacewatch	·	4.6 km	MPC · JPL
308515	2005 UW_{35}	—	October 24, 2005	Kitt Peak	Spacewatch	VER	3.3 km	MPC · JPL
308516	2005 UN_{39}	—	October 24, 2005	Kitt Peak	Spacewatch	·	2.8 km	MPC · JPL
308517	2005 UA_{43}	—	October 22, 2005	Kitt Peak	Spacewatch	·	3.7 km	MPC · JPL
308518	2005 UC_{47}	—	October 22, 2005	Kitt Peak	Spacewatch	·	5.9 km	MPC · JPL
308519	2005 UE_{50}	—	October 23, 2005	Catalina	CSS	(5)	1.9 km	MPC · JPL
308520	2005 UW_{52}	—	October 23, 2005	Catalina	CSS	·	4.0 km	MPC · JPL
308521	2005 UF_{53}	—	October 23, 2005	Catalina	CSS	·	5.0 km	MPC · JPL
308522	2005 UC_{65}	—	October 21, 2005	Palomar	NEAT	·	4.7 km	MPC · JPL
308523	2005 UM_{75}	—	October 24, 2005	Palomar	NEAT	URS	3.6 km	MPC · JPL
308524	2005 UJ_{77}	—	October 24, 2005	Palomar	NEAT	·	3.9 km	MPC · JPL
308525	2005 UM_{83}	—	October 22, 2005	Kitt Peak	Spacewatch	·	3.0 km	MPC · JPL
308526	2005 UN_{83}	—	October 22, 2005	Kitt Peak	Spacewatch	·	2.9 km	MPC · JPL
308527	2005 UK_{89}	—	October 22, 2005	Kitt Peak	Spacewatch	VER	3.6 km	MPC · JPL
308528	2005 UC_{102}	—	October 22, 2005	Kitt Peak	Spacewatch	·	2.5 km	MPC · JPL
308529	2005 UO_{107}	—	October 22, 2005	Catalina	CSS	·	3.3 km	MPC · JPL
308530	2005 UP_{110}	—	October 22, 2005	Kitt Peak	Spacewatch	HYG	2.9 km	MPC · JPL
308531	2005 UZ_{121}	—	October 24, 2005	Kitt Peak	Spacewatch	URS	4.6 km	MPC · JPL
308532	2005 UO_{126}	—	October 24, 2005	Kitt Peak	Spacewatch	·	3.3 km	MPC · JPL
308533	2005 UU_{128}	—	October 24, 2005	Kitt Peak	Spacewatch	·	3.1 km	MPC · JPL
308534	2005 UO_{134}	—	October 25, 2005	Kitt Peak	Spacewatch	·	4.0 km	MPC · JPL
308535	2005 UG_{141}	—	October 25, 2005	Catalina	CSS	·	1.2 km	MPC · JPL
308536	2005 UM_{150}	—	October 26, 2005	Mount Lemmon	Mount Lemmon Survey	·	1.4 km	MPC · JPL
308537	2005 UD_{160}	—	October 22, 2005	Palomar	NEAT	HYG	3.7 km	MPC · JPL
308538	2005 UV_{176}	—	October 24, 2005	Kitt Peak	Spacewatch	·	2.3 km	MPC · JPL
308539	2005 UM_{182}	—	October 24, 2005	Kitt Peak	Spacewatch	·	3.1 km	MPC · JPL
308540	2005 UR_{197}	—	October 25, 2005	Kitt Peak	Spacewatch	·	3.0 km	MPC · JPL
308541	2005 US_{204}	—	October 26, 2005	Kitt Peak	Spacewatch	·	3.2 km	MPC · JPL
308542	2005 UT_{204}	—	October 26, 2005	Kitt Peak	Spacewatch	HYG	3.2 km	MPC · JPL
308543	2005 UO_{213}	—	October 22, 2005	Palomar	NEAT	EOS	2.6 km	MPC · JPL
308544	2005 UU_{224}	—	October 25, 2005	Kitt Peak	Spacewatch	·	3.1 km	MPC · JPL
308545	2005 UE_{232}	—	October 25, 2005	Mount Lemmon	Mount Lemmon Survey	·	1.3 km	MPC · JPL
308546	2005 UP_{235}	—	October 25, 2005	Kitt Peak	Spacewatch	EOS	2.7 km	MPC · JPL
308547	2005 UY_{235}	—	October 25, 2005	Kitt Peak	Spacewatch	HYG	3.5 km	MPC · JPL
308548	2005 UX_{251}	—	October 25, 2005	Catalina	CSS	·	4.0 km	MPC · JPL
308549	2005 UF_{256}	—	October 25, 2005	Kitt Peak	Spacewatch	·	3.1 km	MPC · JPL
308550	2005 UJ_{258}	—	October 25, 2005	Kitt Peak	Spacewatch	·	3.6 km	MPC · JPL
308551	2005 UE_{266}	—	October 27, 2005	Kitt Peak	Spacewatch	·	3.5 km	MPC · JPL
308552	2005 UH_{282}	—	October 26, 2005	Kitt Peak	Spacewatch	THM	2.6 km	MPC · JPL
308553	2005 UR_{288}	—	October 26, 2005	Kitt Peak	Spacewatch	·	3.2 km	MPC · JPL
308554	2005 UZ_{307}	—	October 27, 2005	Mount Lemmon	Mount Lemmon Survey	VER	4.0 km	MPC · JPL
308555	2005 UW_{308}	—	April 5, 2003	Kitt Peak	Spacewatch	·	4.1 km	MPC · JPL
308556	2005 UO_{314}	—	October 28, 2005	Catalina	CSS	TIR	3.8 km	MPC · JPL
308557	2005 UT_{314}	—	October 28, 2005	Catalina	CSS	EOS	2.7 km	MPC · JPL
308558	2005 UU_{314}	—	October 28, 2005	Catalina	CSS	·	4.3 km	MPC · JPL
308559	2005 UH_{322}	—	October 27, 2005	Kitt Peak	Spacewatch	V	870 m	MPC · JPL
308560	2005 UQ_{332}	—	October 29, 2005	Mount Lemmon	Mount Lemmon Survey	·	2.5 km	MPC · JPL
308561	2005 UV_{342}	—	October 29, 2005	Palomar	NEAT	MAR	1.3 km	MPC · JPL
308562	2005 UX_{346}	—	October 30, 2005	Kitt Peak	Spacewatch	fast	3.5 km	MPC · JPL
308563	2005 UL_{348}	—	October 23, 2005	Catalina	CSS	·	4.1 km	MPC · JPL
308564	2005 UV_{350}	—	October 23, 2005	Palomar	NEAT	·	4.4 km	MPC · JPL
308565	2005 UP_{370}	—	October 27, 2005	Kitt Peak	Spacewatch	·	4.3 km	MPC · JPL
308566	2005 UL_{371}	—	October 27, 2005	Mount Lemmon	Mount Lemmon Survey	·	1.1 km	MPC · JPL
308567	2005 UQ_{388}	—	October 26, 2005	Mount Lemmon	Mount Lemmon Survey	·	2.4 km	MPC · JPL
308568	2005 UU_{396}	—	October 27, 2005	Catalina	CSS	·	4.8 km	MPC · JPL
308569	2005 UM_{398}	—	October 31, 2005	Anderson Mesa	LONEOS	·	1.9 km	MPC · JPL
308570	2005 UM_{402}	—	October 28, 2005	Catalina	CSS	THM	2.6 km	MPC · JPL
308571	2005 UP_{405}	—	October 29, 2005	Mount Lemmon	Mount Lemmon Survey	·	940 m	MPC · JPL
308572	2005 UL_{415}	—	October 25, 2005	Kitt Peak	Spacewatch	·	3.1 km	MPC · JPL
308573	2005 UJ_{422}	—	October 27, 2005	Mount Lemmon	Mount Lemmon Survey	·	4.6 km	MPC · JPL
308574	2005 UX_{423}	—	October 28, 2005	Kitt Peak	Spacewatch	·	2.6 km	MPC · JPL
308575	2005 UY_{434}	—	October 29, 2005	Mount Lemmon	Mount Lemmon Survey	·	2.7 km	MPC · JPL
308576	2005 UB_{438}	—	October 27, 2005	Mount Lemmon	Mount Lemmon Survey	ULA · CYB	6.5 km	MPC · JPL
308577	2005 US_{440}	—	October 29, 2005	Catalina	CSS	·	4.5 km	MPC · JPL
308578	2005 UK_{471}	—	October 30, 2005	Kitt Peak	Spacewatch	·	2.9 km	MPC · JPL
308579	2005 UW_{477}	—	October 27, 2005	Palomar	NEAT	HYG	3.5 km	MPC · JPL
308580	2005 UL_{478}	—	October 27, 2005	Mount Lemmon	Mount Lemmon Survey	VER	3.0 km	MPC · JPL
308581	2005 UK_{482}	—	October 22, 2005	Palomar	NEAT	·	4.1 km	MPC · JPL
308582	2005 UL_{486}	—	October 23, 2005	Palomar	NEAT	·	2.3 km	MPC · JPL
308583	2005 UW_{486}	—	October 23, 2005	Palomar	NEAT	·	4.4 km	MPC · JPL
308584	2005 UN_{490}	—	October 23, 2005	Catalina	CSS	EOS	2.7 km	MPC · JPL
308585	2005 UO_{514}	—	October 20, 2005	Apache Point	A. C. Becker	·	2.7 km	MPC · JPL
308586	2005 UA_{515}	—	October 22, 2005	Apache Point	A. C. Becker	·	3.3 km	MPC · JPL
308587	2005 UQ_{516}	—	October 25, 2005	Apache Point	A. C. Becker	·	2.5 km	MPC · JPL
308588	2005 UR_{521}	—	October 26, 2005	Apache Point	A. C. Becker	EOS	2.9 km	MPC · JPL
308589	2005 UC_{522}	—	October 26, 2005	Apache Point	A. C. Becker	·	3.4 km	MPC · JPL
308590	2005 UN_{522}	—	October 27, 2005	Apache Point	A. C. Becker	·	3.2 km	MPC · JPL
308591	2005 US_{525}	—	October 25, 2005	Mount Lemmon	Mount Lemmon Survey	·	1.1 km	MPC · JPL
308592	2005 VL_{2}	—	November 6, 2005	Silver Spring	Spring, Silver	·	5.2 km	MPC · JPL
308593	2005 VZ_{31}	—	November 4, 2005	Kitt Peak	Spacewatch	THM	2.5 km	MPC · JPL
308594	2005 VG_{37}	—	November 3, 2005	Catalina	CSS	·	4.8 km	MPC · JPL
308595	2005 VQ_{47}	—	November 5, 2005	Kitt Peak	Spacewatch	·	3.8 km	MPC · JPL
308596	2005 VY_{54}	—	November 4, 2005	Catalina	CSS	·	3.4 km	MPC · JPL
308597	2005 VS_{61}	—	November 7, 2005	Socorro	LINEAR	·	6.3 km	MPC · JPL
308598	2005 VY_{62}	—	November 1, 2005	Mount Lemmon	Mount Lemmon Survey	·	4.0 km	MPC · JPL
308599	2005 VD_{80}	—	November 5, 2005	Mount Lemmon	Mount Lemmon Survey	·	3.2 km	MPC · JPL
308600	2005 VB_{85}	—	November 4, 2005	Mount Lemmon	Mount Lemmon Survey	·	4.4 km	MPC · JPL

== 308601–308700 ==
back to top

Designation			Discovery			Properties		Ref
Permanent	Provisional	Named after	Date	Site	Discoverer(s)	Category	Diam.	Ref
308601	2005 VW_{97}	—	November 5, 2005	Kitt Peak	Spacewatch	·	3.3 km	MPC · JPL
308602	2005 VO_{110}	—	November 6, 2005	Mount Lemmon	Mount Lemmon Survey	·	2.9 km	MPC · JPL
308603	2005 VA_{111}	—	November 6, 2005	Mount Lemmon	Mount Lemmon Survey	·	2.6 km	MPC · JPL
308604	2005 VX_{112}	—	November 10, 2005	Kitt Peak	Spacewatch	·	530 m	MPC · JPL
308605	2005 VG_{119}	—	November 5, 2005	Mount Lemmon	Mount Lemmon Survey	EOS	2.2 km	MPC · JPL
308606	2005 VU_{130}	—	November 1, 2005	Apache Point	A. C. Becker	·	2.3 km	MPC · JPL
308607	2005 WY_{3}	—	November 21, 2005	Kitt Peak	Spacewatch	T_{j} (2.12) · unusual	10 km	MPC · JPL
308608	2005 WD_{5}	—	November 20, 2005	Palomar	NEAT	EOS	3.2 km	MPC · JPL
308609	2005 WP_{31}	—	November 21, 2005	Kitt Peak	Spacewatch	·	1.4 km	MPC · JPL
308610	2005 WK_{53}	—	November 25, 2005	Mount Lemmon	Mount Lemmon Survey	H	850 m	MPC · JPL
308611	2005 WF_{60}	—	November 26, 2005	Catalina	CSS	·	5.1 km	MPC · JPL
308612	2005 WP_{90}	—	November 28, 2005	Catalina	CSS	·	1.4 km	MPC · JPL
308613	2005 WE_{105}	—	November 29, 2005	Catalina	CSS	T_{j} (2.97)	5.5 km	MPC · JPL
308614	2005 WO_{111}	—	November 30, 2005	Mount Lemmon	Mount Lemmon Survey	·	3.6 km	MPC · JPL
308615	2005 WK_{121}	—	November 30, 2005	Mount Lemmon	Mount Lemmon Survey	·	2.7 km	MPC · JPL
308616	2005 WW_{127}	—	November 25, 2005	Mount Lemmon	Mount Lemmon Survey	·	3.8 km	MPC · JPL
308617	2005 WL_{144}	—	November 22, 2005	Catalina	CSS	EMA	4.0 km	MPC · JPL
308618	2005 WC_{163}	—	November 29, 2005	Mount Lemmon	Mount Lemmon Survey	·	2.3 km	MPC · JPL
308619	2005 WT_{171}	—	November 30, 2005	Kitt Peak	Spacewatch	MIS	2.4 km	MPC · JPL
308620	2005 WM_{191}	—	November 22, 2005	Catalina	CSS	·	5.0 km	MPC · JPL
308621	2005 WV_{193}	—	November 28, 2005	Catalina	CSS	·	1.4 km	MPC · JPL
308622	2005 XR	—	December 2, 2005	Mayhill	Lowe, A.	T_{j} (2.98)	6.8 km	MPC · JPL
308623	2005 XX_{2}	—	December 1, 2005	Kitt Peak	Spacewatch	VER	4.4 km	MPC · JPL
308624	2005 XN_{11}	—	December 1, 2005	Kitt Peak	Spacewatch	CYB	4.5 km	MPC · JPL
308625	2005 XJ_{20}	—	December 2, 2005	Kitt Peak	Spacewatch	·	1.8 km	MPC · JPL
308626	2005 XV_{27}	—	December 1, 2005	Palomar	NEAT	·	3.2 km	MPC · JPL
308627	2005 XG_{45}	—	December 2, 2005	Kitt Peak	Spacewatch	CYB	7.1 km	MPC · JPL
308628	2005 XM_{49}	—	December 2, 2005	Kitt Peak	Spacewatch	TIR	4.6 km	MPC · JPL
308629	2005 XD_{53}	—	December 4, 2005	Kitt Peak	Spacewatch	·	3.7 km	MPC · JPL
308630	2005 XY_{67}	—	December 5, 2005	Kitt Peak	Spacewatch	·	3.1 km	MPC · JPL
308631	2005 XX_{78}	—	December 4, 2005	Catalina	CSS	·	1.4 km	MPC · JPL
308632	2005 XC_{80}	—	December 2, 2005	Catalina	CSS	·	1.6 km	MPC · JPL
308633	2005 XE_{82}	—	December 8, 2005	Kitt Peak	Spacewatch	·	1.1 km	MPC · JPL
308634	2005 XU_{100}	—	December 1, 2005	Kitt Peak	M. W. Buie	cubewano (hot)	247 km	MPC · JPL
308635	2005 YU_{55}	—	December 28, 2005	Kitt Peak	Spacewatch	APO · PHA	400 m	MPC · JPL
308636	2005 YB_{56}	—	December 21, 2005	Kitt Peak	Spacewatch	·	1.2 km	MPC · JPL
308637	2005 YA_{67}	—	December 25, 2005	Kitt Peak	Spacewatch	·	1.7 km	MPC · JPL
308638	2005 YP_{67}	—	December 26, 2005	Kitt Peak	Spacewatch	·	1.0 km	MPC · JPL
308639	2005 YO_{86}	—	December 25, 2005	Mount Lemmon	Mount Lemmon Survey	T_{j} (2.98)	5.8 km	MPC · JPL
308640	2005 YN_{111}	—	December 25, 2005	Kitt Peak	Spacewatch	·	690 m	MPC · JPL
308641	2005 YK_{176}	—	December 22, 2005	Kitt Peak	Spacewatch	·	940 m	MPC · JPL
308642	2006 AB_{34}	—	January 6, 2006	Socorro	LINEAR	·	1.6 km	MPC · JPL
308643	2006 AD_{53}	—	January 5, 2006	Kitt Peak	Spacewatch	·	780 m	MPC · JPL
308644	2006 AH_{64}	—	January 7, 2006	Mount Lemmon	Mount Lemmon Survey	·	640 m	MPC · JPL
308645	2006 AR_{72}	—	January 6, 2006	Kitt Peak	Spacewatch	·	750 m	MPC · JPL
308646	2006 BD_{1}	—	January 19, 2006	Catalina	CSS	·	4.2 km	MPC · JPL
308647	2006 BH_{6}	—	January 20, 2006	Catalina	CSS	H	820 m	MPC · JPL
308648	2006 BE_{22}	—	January 22, 2006	Mount Lemmon	Mount Lemmon Survey	·	1.1 km	MPC · JPL
308649	2006 BL_{25}	—	January 23, 2006	Mount Lemmon	Mount Lemmon Survey	·	830 m	MPC · JPL
308650	2006 BP_{32}	—	January 21, 2006	Kitt Peak	Spacewatch	·	1.1 km	MPC · JPL
308651	2006 BL_{45}	—	January 23, 2006	Mount Lemmon	Mount Lemmon Survey	·	690 m	MPC · JPL
308652	2006 BH_{52}	—	January 25, 2006	Kitt Peak	Spacewatch	·	1.1 km	MPC · JPL
308653	2006 BY_{60}	—	January 22, 2006	Catalina	CSS	·	1.9 km	MPC · JPL
308654	2006 BY_{68}	—	January 23, 2006	Kitt Peak	Spacewatch	·	1.5 km	MPC · JPL
308655	2006 BT_{91}	—	January 26, 2006	Kitt Peak	Spacewatch	·	1.5 km	MPC · JPL
308656	2006 BJ_{101}	—	January 23, 2006	Mount Lemmon	Mount Lemmon Survey	·	660 m	MPC · JPL
308657	2006 BY_{119}	—	January 26, 2006	Kitt Peak	Spacewatch	·	790 m	MPC · JPL
308658	2006 BN_{121}	—	January 26, 2006	Mount Lemmon	Mount Lemmon Survey	·	510 m	MPC · JPL
308659	2006 BL_{128}	—	January 26, 2006	Kitt Peak	Spacewatch	·	930 m	MPC · JPL
308660	2006 BJ_{139}	—	January 28, 2006	Mount Lemmon	Mount Lemmon Survey	L5	10 km	MPC · JPL
308661	2006 BA_{153}	—	January 25, 2006	Kitt Peak	Spacewatch	·	780 m	MPC · JPL
308662	2006 BQ_{164}	—	January 26, 2006	Kitt Peak	Spacewatch	·	530 m	MPC · JPL
308663	2006 BZ_{180}	—	January 27, 2006	Mount Lemmon	Mount Lemmon Survey	·	800 m	MPC · JPL
308664	2006 BH_{213}	—	January 22, 2006	Socorro	LINEAR	·	1.6 km	MPC · JPL
308665	2006 BH_{241}	—	January 31, 2006	Kitt Peak	Spacewatch	·	800 m	MPC · JPL
308666	2006 BC_{263}	—	January 31, 2006	Kitt Peak	Spacewatch	·	1.0 km	MPC · JPL
308667	2006 BF_{269}	—	January 27, 2006	Catalina	CSS	PHO	1.8 km	MPC · JPL
308668	2006 BF_{275}	—	January 27, 2006	Kitt Peak	Spacewatch	·	630 m	MPC · JPL
308669	2006 BP_{276}	—	January 30, 2006	Kitt Peak	Spacewatch	MAS	910 m	MPC · JPL
308670	2006 BV_{282}	—	January 26, 2006	Kitt Peak	Spacewatch	·	1.2 km	MPC · JPL
308671	2006 CQ_{10}	—	February 1, 2006	Kitt Peak	Spacewatch	·	830 m	MPC · JPL
308672	2006 CK_{54}	—	February 4, 2006	Mount Lemmon	Mount Lemmon Survey	PHO	1.4 km	MPC · JPL
308673	2006 DL_{3}	—	February 20, 2006	Catalina	CSS	·	4.5 km	MPC · JPL
308674	2006 DS_{3}	—	February 20, 2006	Catalina	CSS	·	1.2 km	MPC · JPL
308675	2006 DQ_{12}	—	February 21, 2006	Catalina	CSS	·	2.1 km	MPC · JPL
308676	2006 DQ_{29}	—	February 20, 2006	Mount Lemmon	Mount Lemmon Survey	·	780 m	MPC · JPL
308677	2006 DD_{45}	—	February 20, 2006	Kitt Peak	Spacewatch	·	800 m	MPC · JPL
308678	2006 DO_{54}	—	February 24, 2006	Kitt Peak	Spacewatch	·	850 m	MPC · JPL
308679	2006 DM_{62}	—	February 25, 2006	Socorro	LINEAR	·	1.1 km	MPC · JPL
308680 McLennan	2006 DY_{62}	McLennan	February 25, 2006	Mayhill	Lowe, A.	T_{j} (2.9)	7.0 km	MPC · JPL
308681	2006 DH_{63}	—	February 27, 2006	Mayhill	Lowe, A.	·	940 m	MPC · JPL
308682	2006 DG_{86}	—	February 24, 2006	Kitt Peak	Spacewatch	·	900 m	MPC · JPL
308683	2006 DH_{88}	—	February 24, 2006	Kitt Peak	Spacewatch	·	1.5 km	MPC · JPL
308684	2006 DS_{96}	—	February 24, 2006	Kitt Peak	Spacewatch	·	910 m	MPC · JPL
308685	2006 DF_{102}	—	February 25, 2006	Kitt Peak	Spacewatch	·	870 m	MPC · JPL
308686	2006 DS_{103}	—	February 25, 2006	Mount Lemmon	Mount Lemmon Survey	·	710 m	MPC · JPL
308687	2006 DX_{109}	—	February 25, 2006	Mount Lemmon	Mount Lemmon Survey	NYS	1.3 km	MPC · JPL
308688	2006 DD_{113}	—	February 27, 2006	Kitt Peak	Spacewatch	MAS	770 m	MPC · JPL
308689	2006 DQ_{117}	—	February 27, 2006	Kitt Peak	Spacewatch	·	1.1 km	MPC · JPL
308690	2006 DN_{144}	—	February 25, 2006	Mount Lemmon	Mount Lemmon Survey	·	1.1 km	MPC · JPL
308691	2006 DS_{155}	—	February 25, 2006	Kitt Peak	Spacewatch	V	870 m	MPC · JPL
308692	2006 DX_{205}	—	February 25, 2006	Kitt Peak	Spacewatch	·	780 m	MPC · JPL
308693	2006 EK_{1}	—	March 2, 2006	Mount Nyukasa	Japan Aerospace Exploration Agency	·	2.0 km	MPC · JPL
308694	2006 EX_{5}	—	March 2, 2006	Kitt Peak	Spacewatch	·	840 m	MPC · JPL
308695	2006 EN_{12}	—	March 2, 2006	Kitt Peak	Spacewatch	MAS	850 m	MPC · JPL
308696	2006 EV_{12}	—	March 2, 2006	Kitt Peak	Spacewatch	·	1.2 km	MPC · JPL
308697	2006 EU_{19}	—	March 2, 2006	Kitt Peak	Spacewatch	NYS	1.4 km	MPC · JPL
308698	2006 FZ_{9}	—	March 26, 2006	Reedy Creek	J. Broughton	·	1.7 km	MPC · JPL
308699	2006 FH_{19}	—	March 23, 2006	Mount Lemmon	Mount Lemmon Survey	·	1.2 km	MPC · JPL
308700	2006 FE_{27}	—	March 24, 2006	Mount Lemmon	Mount Lemmon Survey	·	1.5 km	MPC · JPL

== 308701–308800 ==
back to top

Designation			Discovery			Properties		Ref
Permanent	Provisional	Named after	Date	Site	Discoverer(s)	Category	Diam.	Ref
308701	2006 FR_{32}	—	March 25, 2006	Kitt Peak	Spacewatch	·	1.7 km	MPC · JPL
308702	2006 FU_{36}	—	March 22, 2006	Catalina	CSS	·	910 m	MPC · JPL
308703	2006 FT_{39}	—	March 24, 2006	Mount Lemmon	Mount Lemmon Survey	·	1.0 km	MPC · JPL
308704	2006 FL_{40}	—	March 25, 2006	Kitt Peak	Spacewatch	(1338) (FLO)	630 m	MPC · JPL
308705	2006 FW_{43}	—	March 23, 2006	Catalina	CSS	·	1.4 km	MPC · JPL
308706	2006 FP_{49}	—	March 25, 2006	Catalina	CSS	PHO	1.4 km	MPC · JPL
308707	2006 FC_{51}	—	March 29, 2006	Socorro	LINEAR	·	1.9 km	MPC · JPL
308708	2006 GD_{9}	—	April 2, 2006	Kitt Peak	Spacewatch	·	1.2 km	MPC · JPL
308709	2006 GZ_{11}	—	April 2, 2006	Kitt Peak	Spacewatch	·	870 m	MPC · JPL
308710	2006 GO_{16}	—	April 2, 2006	Kitt Peak	Spacewatch	·	650 m	MPC · JPL
308711	2006 GO_{27}	—	April 2, 2006	Kitt Peak	Spacewatch	·	1.6 km	MPC · JPL
308712	2006 GR_{29}	—	April 2, 2006	Kitt Peak	Spacewatch	MAS	760 m	MPC · JPL
308713	2006 GG_{34}	—	April 7, 2006	Kitt Peak	Spacewatch	·	850 m	MPC · JPL
308714	2006 GY_{35}	—	April 7, 2006	Socorro	LINEAR	·	1.7 km	MPC · JPL
308715	2006 GT_{36}	—	April 8, 2006	Kitt Peak	Spacewatch	NYS	930 m	MPC · JPL
308716	2006 GJ_{41}	—	April 7, 2006	Catalina	CSS	·	1.6 km	MPC · JPL
308717	2006 GQ_{42}	—	April 7, 2006	Catalina	CSS	·	1.2 km	MPC · JPL
308718	2006 GV_{47}	—	April 9, 2006	Kitt Peak	Spacewatch	·	800 m	MPC · JPL
308719	2006 GO_{52}	—	April 2, 2006	Catalina	CSS	·	1.6 km	MPC · JPL
308720	2006 GX_{53}	—	April 2, 2006	Kitt Peak	Spacewatch	·	820 m	MPC · JPL
308721	2006 HG_{1}	—	April 18, 2006	Palomar	NEAT	·	740 m	MPC · JPL
308722	2006 HT_{18}	—	April 23, 2006	Piszkéstető	K. Sárneczky	(883)	750 m	MPC · JPL
308723	2006 HZ_{20}	—	April 20, 2006	Kitt Peak	Spacewatch	NYS	1.1 km	MPC · JPL
308724	2006 HE_{24}	—	April 20, 2006	Kitt Peak	Spacewatch	·	1.5 km	MPC · JPL
308725	2006 HK_{25}	—	April 20, 2006	Kitt Peak	Spacewatch	V	890 m	MPC · JPL
308726	2006 HB_{28}	—	April 20, 2006	Kitt Peak	Spacewatch	·	1.6 km	MPC · JPL
308727	2006 HF_{29}	—	April 21, 2006	Mount Lemmon	Mount Lemmon Survey	·	770 m	MPC · JPL
308728	2006 HP_{36}	—	April 20, 2006	Catalina	CSS	·	1.2 km	MPC · JPL
308729	2006 HZ_{38}	—	April 21, 2006	Kitt Peak	Spacewatch	(2076)	1.2 km	MPC · JPL
308730	2006 HR_{44}	—	April 24, 2006	Mount Lemmon	Mount Lemmon Survey	·	1.8 km	MPC · JPL
308731	2006 HO_{48}	—	April 24, 2006	Kitt Peak	Spacewatch	MAS	950 m	MPC · JPL
308732	2006 HA_{49}	—	April 25, 2006	Kitt Peak	Spacewatch	·	770 m	MPC · JPL
308733	2006 HC_{69}	—	April 24, 2006	Mount Lemmon	Mount Lemmon Survey	·	820 m	MPC · JPL
308734	2006 HU_{73}	—	April 25, 2006	Kitt Peak	Spacewatch	·	1.1 km	MPC · JPL
308735	2006 HO_{85}	—	April 27, 2006	Kitt Peak	Spacewatch	·	1.5 km	MPC · JPL
308736	2006 HP_{89}	—	April 21, 2006	Catalina	CSS	·	1.8 km	MPC · JPL
308737	2006 HP_{97}	—	April 30, 2006	Kitt Peak	Spacewatch	·	820 m	MPC · JPL
308738	2006 HG_{99}	—	April 30, 2006	Kitt Peak	Spacewatch	·	990 m	MPC · JPL
308739	2006 HZ_{110}	—	April 25, 2006	Kitt Peak	Spacewatch	V	800 m	MPC · JPL
308740	2006 JC_{2}	—	May 1, 2006	Socorro	LINEAR	MAS	780 m	MPC · JPL
308741	2006 JJ_{8}	—	May 1, 2006	Kitt Peak	Spacewatch	NYS	1.4 km	MPC · JPL
308742	2006 JL_{14}	—	May 4, 2006	Siding Spring	SSS	·	2.0 km	MPC · JPL
308743	2006 JY_{30}	—	May 3, 2006	Mount Lemmon	Mount Lemmon Survey	·	1.1 km	MPC · JPL
308744	2006 JO_{37}	—	May 5, 2006	Kitt Peak	Spacewatch	·	1.3 km	MPC · JPL
308745	2006 JR_{37}	—	May 5, 2006	Kitt Peak	Spacewatch	V	920 m	MPC · JPL
308746	2006 JT_{37}	—	May 5, 2006	Mount Lemmon	Mount Lemmon Survey	·	1.6 km	MPC · JPL
308747	2006 JA_{39}	—	May 6, 2006	Mount Lemmon	Mount Lemmon Survey	·	1.2 km	MPC · JPL
308748	2006 JR_{44}	—	May 6, 2006	Mount Lemmon	Mount Lemmon Survey	·	1.9 km	MPC · JPL
308749	2006 JN_{45}	—	May 8, 2006	Mount Lemmon	Mount Lemmon Survey	V	700 m	MPC · JPL
308750	2006 JE_{49}	—	May 1, 2006	Kitt Peak	Spacewatch	·	1.4 km	MPC · JPL
308751	2006 JA_{51}	—	May 2, 2006	Mount Lemmon	Mount Lemmon Survey	·	1.3 km	MPC · JPL
308752	2006 JG_{53}	—	May 6, 2006	Mount Lemmon	Mount Lemmon Survey	·	1.8 km	MPC · JPL
308753 Daniellezemp	2006 JD_{79}	Daniellezemp	May 1, 2006	Mauna Kea	P. A. Wiegert	MAS	750 m	MPC · JPL
308754	2006 KX_{10}	—	May 19, 2006	Mount Lemmon	Mount Lemmon Survey	·	1.8 km	MPC · JPL
308755	2006 KD_{29}	—	May 20, 2006	Kitt Peak	Spacewatch	·	1.3 km	MPC · JPL
308756	2006 KY_{33}	—	May 20, 2006	Kitt Peak	Spacewatch	·	1.4 km	MPC · JPL
308757	2006 KL_{40}	—	May 18, 2006	Palomar	NEAT	·	2.3 km	MPC · JPL
308758	2006 KW_{42}	—	May 20, 2006	Mount Lemmon	Mount Lemmon Survey	·	1.2 km	MPC · JPL
308759	2006 KV_{52}	—	May 21, 2006	Kitt Peak	Spacewatch	(5)	1.3 km	MPC · JPL
308760	2006 KE_{62}	—	May 22, 2006	Kitt Peak	Spacewatch	·	1.6 km	MPC · JPL
308761	2006 KD_{65}	—	May 23, 2006	Mount Lemmon	Mount Lemmon Survey	·	3.2 km	MPC · JPL
308762	2006 KY_{101}	—	May 27, 2006	Kitt Peak	Spacewatch	·	2.7 km	MPC · JPL
308763	2006 KU_{108}	—	May 31, 2006	Mount Lemmon	Mount Lemmon Survey	·	1.2 km	MPC · JPL
308764	2006 LF_{4}	—	June 9, 2006	Palomar	NEAT	·	1.9 km	MPC · JPL
308765	2006 OD_{1}	—	July 19, 2006	Hibiscus	S. F. Hönig	·	1.7 km	MPC · JPL
308766	2006 OE_{4}	—	July 21, 2006	Mount Lemmon	Mount Lemmon Survey	·	2.3 km	MPC · JPL
308767	2006 OO_{8}	—	July 20, 2006	Palomar	NEAT	·	1.8 km	MPC · JPL
308768	2006 ON_{9}	—	July 24, 2006	Hibiscus	S. F. Hönig	·	1.8 km	MPC · JPL
308769	2006 OB_{10}	—	July 20, 2006	Palomar	NEAT	EUP	7.5 km	MPC · JPL
308770	2006 OS_{10}	—	July 21, 2006	Catalina	CSS	·	3.1 km	MPC · JPL
308771	2006 OK_{13}	—	July 21, 2006	Catalina	CSS	·	710 m	MPC · JPL
308772	2006 PU_{3}	—	August 13, 2006	Palomar	NEAT	·	1.9 km	MPC · JPL
308773	2006 PU_{5}	—	August 12, 2006	Palomar	NEAT	EUN	1.5 km	MPC · JPL
308774	2006 PU_{17}	—	August 15, 2006	Palomar	NEAT	EUN	1.7 km	MPC · JPL
308775	2006 PE_{20}	—	August 14, 2006	Siding Spring	SSS	·	2.4 km	MPC · JPL
308776	2006 PE_{22}	—	August 15, 2006	Palomar	NEAT	·	2.9 km	MPC · JPL
308777	2006 PG_{24}	—	August 12, 2006	Palomar	NEAT	·	2.7 km	MPC · JPL
308778	2006 PT_{24}	—	August 12, 2006	Palomar	NEAT	·	4.2 km	MPC · JPL
308779	2006 PD_{28}	—	August 14, 2006	Siding Spring	SSS	·	2.2 km	MPC · JPL
308780	2006 PO_{31}	—	August 13, 2006	Siding Spring	SSS	·	2.0 km	MPC · JPL
308781	2006 PX_{32}	—	August 15, 2006	Siding Spring	SSS	·	2.8 km	MPC · JPL
308782	2006 PH_{37}	—	August 12, 2006	Palomar	NEAT	·	2.4 km	MPC · JPL
308783	2006 QP_{3}	—	August 18, 2006	Socorro	LINEAR	·	1.2 km	MPC · JPL
308784	2006 QR_{3}	—	August 18, 2006	Socorro	LINEAR	·	1.3 km	MPC · JPL
308785	2006 QQ_{20}	—	August 18, 2006	Anderson Mesa	LONEOS	JUN	1.6 km	MPC · JPL
308786	2006 QV_{22}	—	August 19, 2006	Kitt Peak	Spacewatch	·	1.6 km	MPC · JPL
308787	2006 QE_{24}	—	August 17, 2006	Palomar	NEAT	·	2.3 km	MPC · JPL
308788	2006 QW_{25}	—	August 19, 2006	Kitt Peak	Spacewatch	·	1.9 km	MPC · JPL
308789	2006 QR_{26}	—	August 19, 2006	Kitt Peak	Spacewatch	·	2.2 km	MPC · JPL
308790	2006 QV_{28}	—	August 21, 2006	Kitt Peak	Spacewatch	·	2.1 km	MPC · JPL
308791	2006 QO_{35}	—	August 17, 2006	Palomar	NEAT	·	2.5 km	MPC · JPL
308792	2006 QA_{40}	—	August 19, 2006	Reedy Creek	J. Broughton	·	3.0 km	MPC · JPL
308793	2006 QO_{47}	—	August 20, 2006	Palomar	NEAT	·	1.9 km	MPC · JPL
308794	2006 QE_{49}	—	August 21, 2006	Palomar	NEAT	TIN	1.4 km	MPC · JPL
308795	2006 QF_{50}	—	August 22, 2006	Palomar	NEAT	NYS	1.3 km	MPC · JPL
308796	2006 QM_{52}	—	August 23, 2006	Palomar	NEAT	·	2.5 km	MPC · JPL
308797	2006 QT_{56}	—	August 24, 2006	Palomar	NEAT	·	1.8 km	MPC · JPL
308798 Teo	2006 QL_{57}	Teo	August 26, 2006	La Cañada	Lacruz, J.	·	3.0 km	MPC · JPL
308799	2006 QR_{59}	—	August 19, 2006	Palomar	NEAT	·	3.5 km	MPC · JPL
308800	2006 QU_{59}	—	August 19, 2006	Palomar	NEAT	·	2.5 km	MPC · JPL

== 308801–308900 ==
back to top

Designation			Discovery			Properties		Ref
Permanent	Provisional	Named after	Date	Site	Discoverer(s)	Category	Diam.	Ref
308801	2006 QJ_{61}	—	August 22, 2006	Palomar	NEAT	·	2.7 km	MPC · JPL
308802	2006 QR_{81}	—	August 24, 2006	Palomar	NEAT	·	2.7 km	MPC · JPL
308803	2006 QS_{82}	—	August 27, 2006	Kitt Peak	Spacewatch	·	3.6 km	MPC · JPL
308804	2006 QD_{83}	—	August 27, 2006	Kitt Peak	Spacewatch	·	2.3 km	MPC · JPL
308805	2006 QG_{87}	—	August 27, 2006	Kitt Peak	Spacewatch	·	1.5 km	MPC · JPL
308806	2006 QU_{98}	—	August 22, 2006	Palomar	NEAT	·	2.3 km	MPC · JPL
308807	2006 QK_{101}	—	August 19, 2006	Kitt Peak	Spacewatch	·	1.9 km	MPC · JPL
308808	2006 QO_{103}	—	August 27, 2006	Kitt Peak	Spacewatch	·	1.9 km	MPC · JPL
308809	2006 QW_{112}	—	August 24, 2006	Socorro	LINEAR	·	2.7 km	MPC · JPL
308810	2006 QZ_{114}	—	August 27, 2006	Anderson Mesa	LONEOS	·	3.1 km	MPC · JPL
308811	2006 QG_{118}	—	August 27, 2006	Anderson Mesa	LONEOS	·	3.0 km	MPC · JPL
308812	2006 QZ_{118}	—	August 28, 2006	Catalina	CSS	·	1.8 km	MPC · JPL
308813	2006 QD_{124}	—	August 29, 2006	Anderson Mesa	LONEOS	·	1.8 km	MPC · JPL
308814	2006 QJ_{126}	—	August 16, 2006	Palomar	NEAT	·	2.5 km	MPC · JPL
308815	2006 QQ_{147}	—	August 18, 2006	Kitt Peak	Spacewatch	·	3.7 km	MPC · JPL
308816	2006 QR_{147}	—	August 18, 2006	Kitt Peak	Spacewatch	·	1.8 km	MPC · JPL
308817	2006 QQ_{161}	—	August 19, 2006	Kitt Peak	Spacewatch	·	1.4 km	MPC · JPL
308818	2006 QM_{163}	—	August 29, 2006	Kitt Peak	Spacewatch	·	2.0 km	MPC · JPL
308819	2006 QC_{164}	—	August 29, 2006	Anderson Mesa	LONEOS	·	6.2 km	MPC · JPL
308820	2006 QK_{164}	—	August 29, 2006	Anderson Mesa	LONEOS	·	2.2 km	MPC · JPL
308821	2006 QM_{164}	—	August 29, 2006	Anderson Mesa	LONEOS	·	2.3 km	MPC · JPL
308822	2006 QK_{170}	—	August 26, 2006	Siding Spring	SSS	·	2.5 km	MPC · JPL
308823	2006 QR_{170}	—	August 20, 2006	Kitt Peak	Spacewatch	PAD	2.0 km	MPC · JPL
308824	2006 QF_{184}	—	August 28, 2006	Siding Spring	SSS	·	2.3 km	MPC · JPL
308825 Siksika	2006 RH_{3}	Siksika	September 14, 2006	Mauna Kea	D. D. Balam	·	3.3 km	MPC · JPL
308826	2006 RJ_{5}	—	September 14, 2006	Catalina	CSS	·	2.7 km	MPC · JPL
308827	2006 RV_{6}	—	September 14, 2006	Catalina	CSS	·	2.5 km	MPC · JPL
308828	2006 RJ_{11}	—	September 12, 2006	Catalina	CSS	MRX	1.2 km	MPC · JPL
308829	2006 RG_{16}	—	September 14, 2006	Palomar	NEAT	·	2.5 km	MPC · JPL
308830	2006 RY_{19}	—	September 15, 2006	Kitt Peak	Spacewatch	KOR	2.0 km	MPC · JPL
308831	2006 RK_{21}	—	September 15, 2006	Kitt Peak	Spacewatch	·	2.9 km	MPC · JPL
308832	2006 RY_{25}	—	September 14, 2006	Kitt Peak	Spacewatch	·	1.3 km	MPC · JPL
308833	2006 RC_{31}	—	September 15, 2006	Socorro	LINEAR	DOR	3.4 km	MPC · JPL
308834	2006 RJ_{36}	—	September 14, 2006	Palomar	NEAT	·	2.4 km	MPC · JPL
308835	2006 RU_{38}	—	September 14, 2006	Catalina	CSS	·	2.3 km	MPC · JPL
308836	2006 RZ_{38}	—	March 14, 2005	Mount Lemmon	Mount Lemmon Survey	·	3.5 km	MPC · JPL
308837	2006 RW_{48}	—	September 14, 2006	Kitt Peak	Spacewatch	·	1.6 km	MPC · JPL
308838	2006 RV_{52}	—	September 14, 2006	Kitt Peak	Spacewatch	·	2.2 km	MPC · JPL
308839	2006 RY_{55}	—	September 14, 2006	Kitt Peak	Spacewatch	·	1.5 km	MPC · JPL
308840	2006 RC_{56}	—	September 14, 2006	Kitt Peak	Spacewatch	·	3.0 km	MPC · JPL
308841	2006 RV_{56}	—	September 14, 2006	Kitt Peak	Spacewatch	·	1.9 km	MPC · JPL
308842	2006 RW_{57}	—	September 15, 2006	Kitt Peak	Spacewatch	·	1.9 km	MPC · JPL
308843	2006 RA_{61}	—	September 14, 2006	Palomar	NEAT	·	2.3 km	MPC · JPL
308844	2006 RP_{61}	—	September 12, 2006	Catalina	CSS	·	1.9 km	MPC · JPL
308845	2006 RF_{62}	—	September 12, 2006	Catalina	CSS	·	1.7 km	MPC · JPL
308846	2006 RL_{75}	—	September 15, 2006	Kitt Peak	Spacewatch	·	2.1 km	MPC · JPL
308847	2006 RU_{76}	—	September 15, 2006	Kitt Peak	Spacewatch	·	1.5 km	MPC · JPL
308848	2006 RP_{77}	—	September 15, 2006	Kitt Peak	Spacewatch	·	2.3 km	MPC · JPL
308849	2006 RF_{80}	—	September 15, 2006	Kitt Peak	Spacewatch	·	1.7 km	MPC · JPL
308850	2006 RS_{86}	—	September 15, 2006	Kitt Peak	Spacewatch	HOF	2.6 km	MPC · JPL
308851	2006 RZ_{86}	—	September 15, 2006	Kitt Peak	Spacewatch	AGN	1.3 km	MPC · JPL
308852	2006 RW_{88}	—	September 15, 2006	Kitt Peak	Spacewatch	AGN	1.4 km	MPC · JPL
308853	2006 RZ_{95}	—	September 15, 2006	Kitt Peak	Spacewatch	MRX	1.5 km	MPC · JPL
308854	2006 RG_{102}	—	September 1, 2006	Črni Vrh	Matičič, S.	EUN	1.9 km	MPC · JPL
308855	2006 RE_{104}	—	September 11, 2006	Apache Point	A. C. Becker	·	2.2 km	MPC · JPL
308856 Daniket	2006 RS_{109}	Daniket	September 14, 2006	Mauna Kea	Masiero, J.	·	1.5 km	MPC · JPL
308857	2006 RX_{114}	—	September 14, 2006	Mauna Kea	Masiero, J.	·	1.9 km	MPC · JPL
308858	2006 RB_{121}	—	September 14, 2006	Kitt Peak	Spacewatch	HOF	2.7 km	MPC · JPL
308859	2006 SG_{1}	—	September 16, 2006	Kitt Peak	Spacewatch	GEF	1.6 km	MPC · JPL
308860	2006 SJ_{1}	—	September 16, 2006	Kitt Peak	Spacewatch	·	2.8 km	MPC · JPL
308861	2006 SV_{4}	—	September 16, 2006	Palomar	NEAT	·	2.3 km	MPC · JPL
308862	2006 SP_{5}	—	September 16, 2006	Palomar	NEAT	·	2.0 km	MPC · JPL
308863	2006 SW_{6}	—	September 17, 2006	Catalina	CSS	·	1.9 km	MPC · JPL
308864	2006 SD_{13}	—	September 17, 2006	Catalina	CSS	DOR	3.4 km	MPC · JPL
308865	2006 SB_{15}	—	September 17, 2006	Catalina	CSS	MRX	1.2 km	MPC · JPL
308866	2006 SU_{15}	—	September 17, 2006	Catalina	CSS	·	4.6 km	MPC · JPL
308867	2006 SD_{23}	—	September 17, 2006	Anderson Mesa	LONEOS	GEF	1.7 km	MPC · JPL
308868	2006 SY_{25}	—	September 16, 2006	Catalina	CSS	·	4.1 km	MPC · JPL
308869	2006 SS_{31}	—	September 17, 2006	Kitt Peak	Spacewatch	·	1.9 km	MPC · JPL
308870	2006 SX_{35}	—	September 17, 2006	Anderson Mesa	LONEOS	DOR	2.6 km	MPC · JPL
308871	2006 SW_{38}	—	September 18, 2006	Kitt Peak	Spacewatch	·	2.4 km	MPC · JPL
308872	2006 SB_{42}	—	September 18, 2006	Anderson Mesa	LONEOS	MRX	1.6 km	MPC · JPL
308873	2006 SO_{60}	—	September 18, 2006	Catalina	CSS	·	2.0 km	MPC · JPL
308874	2006 SM_{61}	—	September 16, 2006	Catalina	CSS	GEF	1.7 km	MPC · JPL
308875	2006 SA_{71}	—	September 19, 2006	Kitt Peak	Spacewatch	·	2.3 km	MPC · JPL
308876	2006 SU_{72}	—	September 19, 2006	Kitt Peak	Spacewatch	GEF	1.1 km	MPC · JPL
308877	2006 SF_{73}	—	September 19, 2006	Kitt Peak	Spacewatch	KOR	1.5 km	MPC · JPL
308878	2006 SC_{78}	—	September 23, 2006	Piszkéstető	K. Sárneczky, Kuli, Z.	AGN	1.3 km	MPC · JPL
308879	2006 SU_{78}	—	September 16, 2006	Catalina	CSS	·	2.9 km	MPC · JPL
308880	2006 SJ_{90}	—	September 18, 2006	Kitt Peak	Spacewatch	·	2.3 km	MPC · JPL
308881	2006 SW_{92}	—	September 18, 2006	Kitt Peak	Spacewatch	HOF	2.4 km	MPC · JPL
308882	2006 SL_{96}	—	September 18, 2006	Kitt Peak	Spacewatch	·	2.9 km	MPC · JPL
308883	2006 SR_{103}	—	September 19, 2006	Kitt Peak	Spacewatch	·	1.5 km	MPC · JPL
308884	2006 ST_{109}	—	September 20, 2006	Kitt Peak	Spacewatch	·	2.6 km	MPC · JPL
308885	2006 SS_{133}	—	September 17, 2006	Catalina	CSS	MRX	1.1 km	MPC · JPL
308886	2006 SE_{139}	—	September 21, 2006	Anderson Mesa	LONEOS	·	2.2 km	MPC · JPL
308887	2006 SY_{140}	—	September 24, 2006	Anderson Mesa	LONEOS	·	2.2 km	MPC · JPL
308888	2006 SE_{144}	—	September 19, 2006	Kitt Peak	Spacewatch	KOR	1.3 km	MPC · JPL
308889	2006 SV_{150}	—	September 19, 2006	Kitt Peak	Spacewatch	KOR	1.3 km	MPC · JPL
308890	2006 SU_{151}	—	September 19, 2006	Kitt Peak	Spacewatch	·	2.1 km	MPC · JPL
308891	2006 SY_{160}	—	September 23, 2006	Kitt Peak	Spacewatch	·	2.2 km	MPC · JPL
308892	2006 SC_{162}	—	August 21, 2001	Kitt Peak	Spacewatch	·	2.1 km	MPC · JPL
308893	2006 SL_{164}	—	September 25, 2006	Kitt Peak	Spacewatch	EUN	1.9 km	MPC · JPL
308894	2006 SA_{168}	—	September 25, 2006	Kitt Peak	Spacewatch	·	1.7 km	MPC · JPL
308895	2006 ST_{176}	—	September 25, 2006	Kitt Peak	Spacewatch	·	1.3 km	MPC · JPL
308896	2006 SF_{181}	—	September 25, 2006	Mount Lemmon	Mount Lemmon Survey	AGN	1.1 km	MPC · JPL
308897	2006 SL_{183}	—	September 25, 2006	Mount Lemmon	Mount Lemmon Survey	·	1.5 km	MPC · JPL
308898	2006 SU_{184}	—	September 25, 2006	Mount Lemmon	Mount Lemmon Survey	KOR	1.4 km	MPC · JPL
308899	2006 SL_{198}	—	September 29, 2006	Socorro	LINEAR	AMO	770 m	MPC · JPL
308900	2006 SB_{199}	—	September 24, 2006	Kitt Peak	Spacewatch	·	2.0 km	MPC · JPL

== 308901–309000 ==
back to top

Designation			Discovery			Properties		Ref
Permanent	Provisional	Named after	Date	Site	Discoverer(s)	Category	Diam.	Ref
308901	2006 SB_{203}	—	September 25, 2006	Mount Lemmon	Mount Lemmon Survey	·	1.8 km	MPC · JPL
308902	2006 SM_{206}	—	September 25, 2006	Mount Lemmon	Mount Lemmon Survey	AST	1.9 km	MPC · JPL
308903	2006 SV_{231}	—	September 26, 2006	Kitt Peak	Spacewatch	·	1.8 km	MPC · JPL
308904	2006 SK_{232}	—	September 26, 2006	Kitt Peak	Spacewatch	·	1.9 km	MPC · JPL
308905	2006 SK_{234}	—	September 26, 2006	Kitt Peak	Spacewatch	MRX	1.2 km	MPC · JPL
308906	2006 SY_{234}	—	September 26, 2006	Kitt Peak	Spacewatch	AGN	1.2 km	MPC · JPL
308907	2006 SH_{236}	—	August 28, 2006	Kitt Peak	Spacewatch	·	1.6 km	MPC · JPL
308908	2006 SW_{254}	—	September 26, 2006	Mount Lemmon	Mount Lemmon Survey	AST	1.6 km	MPC · JPL
308909	2006 SQ_{261}	—	September 26, 2006	Mount Lemmon	Mount Lemmon Survey	·	2.6 km	MPC · JPL
308910	2006 SN_{264}	—	September 26, 2006	Kitt Peak	Spacewatch	·	1.0 km	MPC · JPL
308911	2006 SW_{265}	—	September 26, 2006	Kitt Peak	Spacewatch	EOS	2.0 km	MPC · JPL
308912	2006 SZ_{268}	—	September 26, 2006	Kitt Peak	Spacewatch	·	1.6 km	MPC · JPL
308913	2006 SZ_{273}	—	September 27, 2006	Mount Lemmon	Mount Lemmon Survey	·	1.9 km	MPC · JPL
308914	2006 SM_{286}	—	September 19, 2006	Catalina	CSS	EUN	1.7 km	MPC · JPL
308915	2006 SG_{291}	—	September 16, 2006	Siding Spring	SSS	·	2.9 km	MPC · JPL
308916	2006 SD_{292}	—	September 27, 2006	Catalina	CSS	T_{j} (2.91)	5.1 km	MPC · JPL
308917	2006 SH_{296}	—	September 25, 2006	Kitt Peak	Spacewatch	·	2.0 km	MPC · JPL
308918	2006 SD_{305}	—	September 27, 2006	Kitt Peak	Spacewatch	AGN	1.6 km	MPC · JPL
308919	2006 SC_{316}	—	September 27, 2006	Kitt Peak	Spacewatch	·	1.6 km	MPC · JPL
308920	2006 SO_{318}	—	September 27, 2006	Kitt Peak	Spacewatch	WIT	1.2 km	MPC · JPL
308921	2006 SK_{319}	—	September 27, 2006	Kitt Peak	Spacewatch	·	2.7 km	MPC · JPL
308922	2006 SA_{323}	—	September 27, 2006	Kitt Peak	Spacewatch	·	1.8 km	MPC · JPL
308923	2006 SS_{325}	—	September 27, 2006	Kitt Peak	Spacewatch	AST	1.7 km	MPC · JPL
308924	2006 SR_{331}	—	September 28, 2006	Kitt Peak	Spacewatch	AST	1.7 km	MPC · JPL
308925	2006 SB_{333}	—	September 28, 2006	Kitt Peak	Spacewatch	HOF	2.3 km	MPC · JPL
308926	2006 SF_{334}	—	September 28, 2006	Kitt Peak	Spacewatch	·	2.0 km	MPC · JPL
308927	2006 SG_{336}	—	September 28, 2006	Kitt Peak	Spacewatch	·	2.0 km	MPC · JPL
308928	2006 SE_{349}	—	September 29, 2006	Socorro	LINEAR	·	2.5 km	MPC · JPL
308929	2006 SE_{352}	—	September 30, 2006	Catalina	CSS	·	2.4 km	MPC · JPL
308930	2006 SW_{352}	—	September 30, 2006	Catalina	CSS	·	2.7 km	MPC · JPL
308931	2006 SM_{365}	—	September 30, 2006	Mount Lemmon	Mount Lemmon Survey	·	1.8 km	MPC · JPL
308932	2006 SO_{367}	—	September 26, 2006	Catalina	CSS	·	3.3 km	MPC · JPL
308933	2006 SQ_{372}	—	September 27, 2006	Apache Point	A. C. Becker, Puckett, A. W., Kubica, J.	centaur	142 km	MPC · JPL
308934 Merkinė	2006 SV_{372}	Merkinė	September 25, 2006	Moletai	K. Černis, J. Zdanavičius	·	2.4 km	MPC · JPL
308935	2006 SK_{383}	—	September 29, 2006	Apache Point	A. C. Becker	·	2.6 km	MPC · JPL
308936	2006 SL_{391}	—	September 18, 2006	Kitt Peak	Spacewatch	·	2.0 km	MPC · JPL
308937	2006 SN_{393}	—	September 28, 2006	Mount Lemmon	Mount Lemmon Survey	·	1.6 km	MPC · JPL
308938	2006 SF_{395}	—	September 17, 2006	Mauna Kea	Masiero, J.	JUN	950 m	MPC · JPL
308939	2006 SL_{397}	—	September 25, 2006	Kitt Peak	Spacewatch	·	1.7 km	MPC · JPL
308940	2006 SS_{400}	—	September 25, 2006	Kitt Peak	Spacewatch	·	2.0 km	MPC · JPL
308941	2006 SE_{406}	—	September 19, 2006	Kitt Peak	Spacewatch	KOR	1.3 km	MPC · JPL
308942	2006 SV_{409}	—	September 18, 2006	Anderson Mesa	LONEOS	·	2.4 km	MPC · JPL
308943	2006 SL_{412}	—	September 27, 2006	Mount Lemmon	Mount Lemmon Survey	·	2.5 km	MPC · JPL
308944	2006 SO_{413}	—	September 29, 2006	Anderson Mesa	LONEOS	·	2.7 km	MPC · JPL
308945	2006 TY_{1}	—	October 1, 2006	Kitt Peak	Spacewatch	·	1.6 km	MPC · JPL
308946	2006 TZ_{11}	—	October 15, 2006	Piszkéstető	K. Sárneczky, Kuli, Z.	·	1.9 km	MPC · JPL
308947	2006 TV_{13}	—	October 10, 2006	Palomar	NEAT	·	2.6 km	MPC · JPL
308948	2006 TC_{14}	—	October 10, 2006	Palomar	NEAT	AEO	1.5 km	MPC · JPL
308949	2006 TG_{15}	—	September 19, 2006	Kitt Peak	Spacewatch	KOR	1.4 km	MPC · JPL
308950	2006 TJ_{16}	—	October 11, 2006	Kitt Peak	Spacewatch	AGN	1.5 km	MPC · JPL
308951	2006 TX_{16}	—	October 11, 2006	Kitt Peak	Spacewatch	NYS	1.3 km	MPC · JPL
308952	2006 TF_{24}	—	October 12, 2006	Kitt Peak	Spacewatch	AGN	1.5 km	MPC · JPL
308953	2006 TG_{32}	—	October 12, 2006	Kitt Peak	Spacewatch	EOS	1.9 km	MPC · JPL
308954	2006 TU_{35}	—	October 12, 2006	Kitt Peak	Spacewatch	·	3.3 km	MPC · JPL
308955	2006 TS_{36}	—	October 12, 2006	Kitt Peak	Spacewatch	·	1.7 km	MPC · JPL
308956	2006 TA_{38}	—	October 12, 2006	Kitt Peak	Spacewatch	·	1.7 km	MPC · JPL
308957	2006 TA_{42}	—	October 12, 2006	Kitt Peak	Spacewatch	·	2.5 km	MPC · JPL
308958	2006 TK_{44}	—	October 12, 2006	Kitt Peak	Spacewatch	GEF	1.6 km	MPC · JPL
308959	2006 TA_{46}	—	October 12, 2006	Kitt Peak	Spacewatch	·	2.4 km	MPC · JPL
308960	2006 TL_{46}	—	October 12, 2006	Kitt Peak	Spacewatch	·	2.2 km	MPC · JPL
308961	2006 TJ_{47}	—	October 12, 2006	Kitt Peak	Spacewatch	·	1.7 km	MPC · JPL
308962	2006 TU_{50}	—	October 12, 2006	Kitt Peak	Spacewatch	KOR	1.4 km	MPC · JPL
308963	2006 TE_{61}	—	October 15, 2006	Catalina	CSS	·	1.6 km	MPC · JPL
308964	2006 TH_{65}	—	October 11, 2006	Palomar	NEAT	PHO	1.0 km	MPC · JPL
308965	2006 TG_{67}	—	October 11, 2006	Palomar	NEAT	EUN	1.9 km	MPC · JPL
308966	2006 TD_{69}	—	October 11, 2006	Palomar	NEAT	·	2.8 km	MPC · JPL
308967	2006 TH_{70}	—	October 11, 2006	Kitt Peak	Spacewatch	·	2.0 km	MPC · JPL
308968	2006 TL_{74}	—	October 11, 2006	Palomar	NEAT	·	2.8 km	MPC · JPL
308969	2006 TK_{77}	—	October 11, 2006	Palomar	NEAT	·	2.9 km	MPC · JPL
308970	2006 TP_{87}	—	October 13, 2006	Kitt Peak	Spacewatch	·	1.9 km	MPC · JPL
308971	2006 TJ_{96}	—	October 12, 2006	Palomar	NEAT	·	3.1 km	MPC · JPL
308972	2006 TA_{97}	—	November 20, 2001	Socorro	LINEAR	·	2.2 km	MPC · JPL
308973	2006 TH_{99}	—	October 15, 2006	Kitt Peak	Spacewatch	·	2.0 km	MPC · JPL
308974	2006 TQ_{99}	—	October 15, 2006	Kitt Peak	Spacewatch	AGN	1.3 km	MPC · JPL
308975	2006 TY_{99}	—	October 15, 2006	Kitt Peak	Spacewatch	·	2.7 km	MPC · JPL
308976	2006 TH_{102}	—	October 15, 2006	Kitt Peak	Spacewatch	·	730 m	MPC · JPL
308977	2006 TU_{103}	—	October 15, 2006	Kitt Peak	Spacewatch	·	2.8 km	MPC · JPL
308978	2006 TJ_{114}	—	October 1, 2006	Apache Point	A. C. Becker	EOS	2.0 km	MPC · JPL
308979	2006 TZ_{116}	—	October 3, 2006	Apache Point	A. C. Becker	NEM	2.8 km	MPC · JPL
308980	2006 TB_{118}	—	October 3, 2006	Apache Point	A. C. Becker	NAE	2.5 km	MPC · JPL
308981	2006 TM_{123}	—	October 1, 2006	Kitt Peak	Spacewatch	EOS	2.5 km	MPC · JPL
308982	2006 TK_{124}	—	October 2, 2006	Mount Lemmon	Mount Lemmon Survey	·	2.7 km	MPC · JPL
308983	2006 TY_{128}	—	October 2, 2006	Mount Lemmon	Mount Lemmon Survey	·	3.7 km	MPC · JPL
308984	2006 TB_{130}	—	October 2, 2006	Kitt Peak	Spacewatch	·	3.4 km	MPC · JPL
308985	2006 UA_{1}	—	October 16, 2006	Altschwendt	W. Ries	KOR	1.7 km	MPC · JPL
308986	2006 UK_{10}	—	September 26, 2006	Mount Lemmon	Mount Lemmon Survey	EOS	2.2 km	MPC · JPL
308987	2006 UX_{10}	—	October 17, 2006	Mount Lemmon	Mount Lemmon Survey	·	2.0 km	MPC · JPL
308988	2006 UE_{13}	—	October 17, 2006	Mount Lemmon	Mount Lemmon Survey	KOR	1.4 km	MPC · JPL
308989	2006 UK_{16}	—	October 17, 2006	Mount Lemmon	Mount Lemmon Survey	·	2.1 km	MPC · JPL
308990	2006 UG_{17}	—	October 16, 2006	Kitt Peak	Spacewatch	HOF	3.1 km	MPC · JPL
308991	2006 UP_{20}	—	October 3, 2006	Kitt Peak	Spacewatch	MRX	1.3 km	MPC · JPL
308992	2006 UX_{24}	—	October 16, 2006	Kitt Peak	Spacewatch	·	3.6 km	MPC · JPL
308993	2006 UD_{32}	—	October 16, 2006	Kitt Peak	Spacewatch	KOR	1.5 km	MPC · JPL
308994	2006 UE_{35}	—	October 16, 2006	Kitt Peak	Spacewatch	·	1.7 km	MPC · JPL
308995	2006 UY_{36}	—	October 16, 2006	Kitt Peak	Spacewatch	KOR	1.2 km	MPC · JPL
308996	2006 UV_{37}	—	October 16, 2006	Kitt Peak	Spacewatch	fast	2.4 km	MPC · JPL
308997	2006 UD_{39}	—	October 16, 2006	Kitt Peak	Spacewatch	·	2.2 km	MPC · JPL
308998	2006 UJ_{39}	—	October 16, 2006	Kitt Peak	Spacewatch	·	1.9 km	MPC · JPL
308999	2006 UJ_{42}	—	October 16, 2006	Kitt Peak	Spacewatch	·	2.0 km	MPC · JPL
309000	2006 UH_{44}	—	October 16, 2006	Kitt Peak	Spacewatch	·	1.1 km	MPC · JPL

back to top

== See also ==
- Meanings of minor-planet names: 308001–309000
