= List of minor planets: 306001–307000 =

The following is a partial list of minor planets, running from minor-planet number 306001 through 307000, inclusive. The primary data for this and other partial lists is based on JPL's "Small-Body Orbital Elements" and data available from the Minor Planet Center. Critical list information is also provided by the MPC, unless otherwise specified from Lowell Observatory. A detailed description of the table's columns and additional sources are given on the main page including a complete list of every page in this series, and a statistical break-up on the dynamical classification of minor planets.

Also see the summary list of all named bodies in numerical and alphabetical order, and the corresponding naming citations for the number range of this particular list. New namings may only be added to this list after official publication, as the preannouncement of names is condemned by the Working Group for Small Bodies Nomenclature of the International Astronomical Union.

Near-Earth obj.	MBA (inner)	MBA (outer)	Centaur
Mars-crosser	MBA (middle)	Jupiter trojan	Trans-Neptunian obj.
Unclassified

== 306001–306100 ==
Designation			Discovery			Properties		Ref
Permanent	Provisional	Named after	Date	Site	Discoverer(s)	Category	Diam.	Ref
306001 Joanllaneras	2009 TD_{42}	Joanllaneras	October 15, 2009	La Sagra	OAM	L4	10 km	MPC; JPL
306002	2009 VO_{72}	—	November 24, 2000	Kitt Peak	Spacewatch	GEF	1.6 km	MPC; JPL
306003	2009 WM_{32}	—	November 16, 2009	Mount Lemmon	Mount Lemmon Survey	L4	10 km	MPC; JPL
306004	2010 CZ_{9}	—	February 8, 2010	WISE	WISE	·	2.2 km	MPC; JPL
306005	2010 CN_{10}	—	February 8, 2010	WISE	WISE	·	4.9 km	MPC; JPL
306006	2010 CE_{31}	—	February 9, 2010	Kitt Peak	Spacewatch	·	830 m	MPC; JPL
306007	2010 CP_{93}	—	February 14, 2010	Kitt Peak	Spacewatch	·	1.1 km	MPC; JPL
306008	2010 CO_{116}	—	February 14, 2010	Kitt Peak	Spacewatch	·	2.3 km	MPC; JPL
306009	2010 CJ_{127}	—	February 15, 2010	Kitt Peak	Spacewatch	·	930 m	MPC; JPL
306010	2010 CY_{136}	—	February 15, 2010	WISE	WISE	(14916)	3.1 km	MPC; JPL
306011	2010 CV_{158}	—	February 15, 2010	Kitt Peak	Spacewatch	·	1.8 km	MPC; JPL
306012	2010 CP_{168}	—	February 15, 2010	Mount Lemmon	Mount Lemmon Survey	V	680 m	MPC; JPL
306013	2010 CZ_{179}	—	February 15, 2010	Catalina	CSS	H	780 m	MPC; JPL
306014	2010 DC_{12}	—	February 16, 2010	Kitt Peak	Spacewatch	·	1.9 km	MPC; JPL
306015	2010 DL_{18}	—	February 16, 2010	WISE	WISE	·	2.2 km	MPC; JPL
306016	2010 DO_{23}	—	February 18, 2010	WISE	WISE	·	2.1 km	MPC; JPL
306017	2010 DY_{23}	—	February 18, 2010	WISE	WISE	PHO	3.0 km	MPC; JPL
306018	2010 DE_{25}	—	February 19, 2010	WISE	WISE	KON	3.4 km	MPC; JPL
306019 Duren	2010 DD_{27}	Duren	February 18, 2010	WISE	WISE	·	2.8 km	MPC; JPL
306020 Kormilov	2010 DC_{34}	Kormilov	February 22, 2010	Zelenchukskaya Stn	T. V. Krjačko	H	830 m	MPC; JPL
306021	2010 DT_{48}	—	February 17, 2010	Kitt Peak	Spacewatch	·	1.5 km	MPC; JPL
306022	2010 DU_{67}	—	February 27, 2010	WISE	WISE	·	4.3 km	MPC; JPL
306023	2010 DF_{70}	—	February 28, 2010	WISE	WISE	·	3.6 km	MPC; JPL
306024	2010 DF_{79}	—	February 18, 2010	Mount Lemmon	Mount Lemmon Survey	·	1.4 km	MPC; JPL
306025	2010 EV_{37}	—	March 12, 2010	Mount Lemmon	Mount Lemmon Survey	MAS	940 m	MPC; JPL
306026	2010 EY_{70}	—	March 12, 2010	Kitt Peak	Spacewatch	·	710 m	MPC; JPL
306027	2010 EX_{78}	—	September 24, 2000	Socorro	LINEAR	·	1.4 km	MPC; JPL
306028	2010 ER_{80}	—	August 24, 2001	Anderson Mesa	LONEOS	·	760 m	MPC; JPL
306029	2010 EL_{83}	—	March 12, 2010	Kitt Peak	Spacewatch	·	2.2 km	MPC; JPL
306030	2010 ET_{107}	—	March 12, 2010	Kitt Peak	Spacewatch	·	1.4 km	MPC; JPL
306031	2010 ET_{122}	—	March 15, 2010	Kitt Peak	Spacewatch	·	2.3 km	MPC; JPL
306032	2010 EH_{123}	—	March 15, 2010	Kitt Peak	Spacewatch	ADE	2.1 km	MPC; JPL
306033	2010 EV_{125}	—	March 13, 2010	Catalina	CSS	·	2.0 km	MPC; JPL
306034	2010 EF_{126}	—	July 22, 2004	Mauna Kea	Veillet, C.	·	840 m	MPC; JPL
306035	2010 EQ_{126}	—	March 14, 2010	Kitt Peak	Spacewatch	·	1.8 km	MPC; JPL
306036	2010 EJ_{130}	—	October 10, 2004	Kitt Peak	Spacewatch	·	940 m	MPC; JPL
306037	2010 EV_{133}	—	March 15, 2010	Mount Lemmon	Mount Lemmon Survey	·	700 m	MPC; JPL
306038	2010 ES_{136}	—	March 12, 2010	Kitt Peak	Spacewatch	·	1.1 km	MPC; JPL
306039	2010 EU_{137}	—	March 12, 2010	Kitt Peak	Spacewatch	·	1.4 km	MPC; JPL
306040	2010 EF_{139}	—	February 21, 2007	Catalina	CSS	H	790 m	MPC; JPL
306041	2010 EB_{140}	—	September 10, 2007	Catalina	CSS	V	800 m	MPC; JPL
306042	2010 EQ_{140}	—	March 15, 2010	Catalina	CSS	H	680 m	MPC; JPL
306043	2010 EM_{142}	—	March 15, 2010	Mount Lemmon	Mount Lemmon Survey	·	1.6 km	MPC; JPL
306044	2010 EQ_{163}	—	March 3, 2010	WISE	WISE	·	2.5 km	MPC; JPL
306045	2010 FV_{4}	—	March 12, 2003	Kitt Peak	Spacewatch	·	770 m	MPC; JPL
306046	2010 FW_{5}	—	March 17, 2010	Kitt Peak	Spacewatch	·	1.2 km	MPC; JPL
306047	2010 FV_{82}	—	March 25, 2010	Kitt Peak	Spacewatch	MAS	820 m	MPC; JPL
306048	2010 FQ_{87}	—	March 25, 2010	Kitt Peak	Spacewatch	·	720 m	MPC; JPL
306049	2010 FW_{90}	—	March 21, 2010	Mount Lemmon	Mount Lemmon Survey	BAP	820 m	MPC; JPL
306050	2010 FA_{91}	—	March 21, 2010	Mount Lemmon	Mount Lemmon Survey	·	1.3 km	MPC; JPL
306051	2010 FR_{91}	—	March 25, 2010	Mount Lemmon	Mount Lemmon Survey	·	890 m	MPC; JPL
306052	2010 GO_{25}	—	April 8, 2010	Mayhill	Lowe, A.	H	780 m	MPC; JPL
306053	2010 GE_{26}	—	April 4, 2010	Kitt Peak	Spacewatch	·	1.4 km	MPC; JPL
306054	2010 GD_{27}	—	April 5, 2010	Kitt Peak	Spacewatch	V	910 m	MPC; JPL
306055	2010 GJ_{28}	—	April 6, 2010	Kitt Peak	Spacewatch	·	1.9 km	MPC; JPL
306056	2010 GY_{28}	—	April 8, 2010	Sandlot	G. Hug	·	1.6 km	MPC; JPL
306057	2010 GF_{31}	—	April 4, 2010	Catalina	CSS	·	920 m	MPC; JPL
306058	2010 GV_{31}	—	November 7, 2008	Mount Lemmon	Mount Lemmon Survey	·	860 m	MPC; JPL
306059	2010 GY_{33}	—	April 9, 2010	Kachina	Hobart, J.	H	410 m	MPC; JPL
306060	2010 GB_{65}	—	April 8, 2010	Catalina	CSS	·	1.4 km	MPC; JPL
306061	2010 GC_{66}	—	April 6, 2010	Catalina	CSS	·	2.7 km	MPC; JPL
306062	2010 GL_{66}	—	April 7, 2010	Mount Lemmon	Mount Lemmon Survey	NYS	1.7 km	MPC; JPL
306063	2010 GG_{67}	—	February 26, 2007	Catalina	CSS	H	670 m	MPC; JPL
306064	2010 GQ_{95}	—	November 25, 2006	Kitt Peak	Spacewatch	·	3.7 km	MPC; JPL
306065	2010 GZ_{96}	—	April 4, 2010	Kitt Peak	Spacewatch	·	1.7 km	MPC; JPL
306066	2010 GG_{98}	—	April 10, 2010	Mount Lemmon	Mount Lemmon Survey	MAS	780 m	MPC; JPL
306067	2010 GW_{99}	—	April 4, 2010	Kitt Peak	Spacewatch	V	970 m	MPC; JPL
306068	2010 GF_{104}	—	April 7, 2010	Kitt Peak	Spacewatch	MAS	960 m	MPC; JPL
306069	2010 GQ_{105}	—	April 7, 2010	Kitt Peak	Spacewatch	V	940 m	MPC; JPL
306070	2010 GK_{106}	—	April 7, 2010	Mount Lemmon	Mount Lemmon Survey	·	1.6 km	MPC; JPL
306071	2010 GH_{107}	—	April 8, 2010	Kitt Peak	Spacewatch	·	890 m	MPC; JPL
306072	2010 GV_{107}	—	April 29, 2003	Anderson Mesa	LONEOS	NYS	880 m	MPC; JPL
306073	2010 GR_{109}	—	August 1, 2000	Socorro	LINEAR	·	1.0 km	MPC; JPL
306074	2010 GF_{118}	—	April 10, 2010	Kitt Peak	Spacewatch	·	1.7 km	MPC; JPL
306075	2010 GJ_{119}	—	April 11, 2010	Kitt Peak	Spacewatch	SUL	2.1 km	MPC; JPL
306076	2010 GC_{121}	—	March 3, 2006	Kitt Peak	Spacewatch	MAS	790 m	MPC; JPL
306077	2010 GJ_{123}	—	September 22, 2004	Kitt Peak	Spacewatch	·	1.3 km	MPC; JPL
306078	2010 GX_{123}	—	April 15, 2010	Kitt Peak	Spacewatch	·	2.3 km	MPC; JPL
306079	2010 GV_{127}	—	April 10, 2010	Kitt Peak	Spacewatch	·	1.0 km	MPC; JPL
306080	2010 GP_{138}	—	April 6, 2010	Mount Lemmon	Mount Lemmon Survey	·	2.0 km	MPC; JPL
306081	2010 GG_{140}	—	April 7, 2010	Mount Lemmon	Mount Lemmon Survey	·	910 m	MPC; JPL
306082	2010 GF_{141}	—	April 8, 2010	Mount Lemmon	Mount Lemmon Survey	·	770 m	MPC; JPL
306083	2010 GX_{142}	—	April 10, 2010	Westfield	Astronomical Research Observatory	·	1.3 km	MPC; JPL
306084	2010 GP_{154}	—	April 15, 2010	WISE	WISE	HOF	2.8 km	MPC; JPL
306085	2010 GM_{156}	—	April 5, 2010	Kitt Peak	Spacewatch	·	820 m	MPC; JPL
306086	2010 GO_{159}	—	April 9, 2010	Mount Lemmon	Mount Lemmon Survey	V	870 m	MPC; JPL
306087	2010 GQ_{160}	—	April 15, 2010	Mount Lemmon	Mount Lemmon Survey	EUN	1.4 km	MPC; JPL
306088	2010 HD_{7}	—	April 16, 2010	WISE	WISE	·	4.1 km	MPC; JPL
306089	2010 HE_{20}	—	April 17, 2010	Mount Lemmon	Mount Lemmon Survey	·	1.4 km	MPC; JPL
306090	2010 HP_{25}	—	April 19, 2010	WISE	WISE	HOF · fast	4.5 km	MPC; JPL
306091	2010 HA_{35}	—	April 20, 2010	WISE	WISE	·	6.4 km	MPC; JPL
306092	2010 HZ_{40}	—	April 22, 2010	WISE	WISE	VER	3.6 km	MPC; JPL
306093	2010 HO_{43}	—	April 23, 2010	WISE	WISE	·	4.1 km	MPC; JPL
306094	2010 HG_{45}	—	April 23, 2010	WISE	WISE	EOS	3.4 km	MPC; JPL
306095	2010 HB_{51}	—	April 24, 2010	WISE	WISE	·	5.1 km	MPC; JPL
306096	2010 HD_{51}	—	April 24, 2010	WISE	WISE	·	3.6 km	MPC; JPL
306097	2010 HS_{58}	—	April 22, 2009	Kitt Peak	Spacewatch	·	4.3 km	MPC; JPL
306098	2010 HS_{67}	—	April 26, 2010	WISE	WISE	HOF	3.5 km	MPC; JPL
306099	2010 HS_{77}	—	April 20, 2010	Kitt Peak	Spacewatch	·	3.4 km	MPC; JPL
306100	2010 HY_{79}	—	April 20, 2010	Kitt Peak	Spacewatch	(1547)	2.5 km	MPC; JPL

== 306101–306200 ==
back to top

Designation			Discovery			Properties		Ref
Permanent	Provisional	Named after	Date	Site	Discoverer(s)	Category	Diam.	Ref
306101	2010 HZ_{81}	—	August 6, 2007	Lulin	LUSS	V	900 m	MPC; JPL
306102	2010 HS_{83}	—	April 28, 2010	WISE	WISE	·	2.6 km	MPC; JPL
306103	2010 HE_{105}	—	April 26, 2003	Kitt Peak	Spacewatch	·	890 m	MPC; JPL
306104	2010 HE_{107}	—	April 26, 2010	Mount Lemmon	Mount Lemmon Survey	·	1.0 km	MPC; JPL
306105	2010 JU_{14}	—	May 5, 2010	Mayhill	Mayhill	·	1.3 km	MPC; JPL
306106	2010 JF_{29}	—	May 3, 2010	Kitt Peak	Spacewatch	·	1.8 km	MPC; JPL
306107	2010 JV_{30}	—	April 2, 2006	Mount Lemmon	Mount Lemmon Survey	·	1.3 km	MPC; JPL
306108	2010 JE_{32}	—	May 6, 2010	Mount Lemmon	Mount Lemmon Survey	·	1.2 km	MPC; JPL
306109	2010 JZ_{32}	—	May 6, 2010	Mount Lemmon	Mount Lemmon Survey	·	880 m	MPC; JPL
306110	2010 JK_{35}	—	May 4, 2010	Siding Spring	SSS	·	2.0 km	MPC; JPL
306111	2010 JS_{37}	—	May 9, 2010	Mount Lemmon	Mount Lemmon Survey	·	3.0 km	MPC; JPL
306112	2010 JK_{38}	—	May 4, 2010	Siding Spring	SSS	(194)	2.4 km	MPC; JPL
306113	2010 JN_{40}	—	April 19, 2006	Mount Lemmon	Mount Lemmon Survey	·	1.5 km	MPC; JPL
306114	2010 JP_{43}	—	May 3, 2010	Kitt Peak	Spacewatch	·	1.2 km	MPC; JPL
306115	2010 JQ_{47}	—	May 3, 2010	Kitt Peak	Spacewatch	MAS	880 m	MPC; JPL
306116	2010 JZ_{61}	—	May 8, 2010	WISE	WISE	·	3.5 km	MPC; JPL
306117	2010 JO_{73}	—	May 8, 2010	Mount Lemmon	Mount Lemmon Survey	·	910 m	MPC; JPL
306118	2010 JC_{77}	—	May 8, 2010	Mount Lemmon	Mount Lemmon Survey	·	1.5 km	MPC; JPL
306119	2010 JX_{82}	—	May 4, 2010	Kitt Peak	Spacewatch	·	1.0 km	MPC; JPL
306120	2010 JY_{82}	—	May 4, 2010	Kitt Peak	Spacewatch	·	1.0 km	MPC; JPL
306121	2010 JB_{83}	—	May 5, 2010	Vail-Jarnac	Jarnac	H	550 m	MPC; JPL
306122	2010 JF_{83}	—	October 30, 2000	Socorro	LINEAR	H	760 m	MPC; JPL
306123	2010 JY_{84}	—	November 22, 2008	Kitt Peak	Spacewatch	V	760 m	MPC; JPL
306124	2010 JT_{87}	—	May 12, 2010	Nogales	Tenagra II	·	990 m	MPC; JPL
306125	2010 JW_{87}	—	August 20, 2003	Campo Imperatore	CINEOS	·	1.7 km	MPC; JPL
306126	2010 JK_{101}	—	May 11, 2010	WISE	WISE	·	3.3 km	MPC; JPL
306127	2010 JE_{103}	—	May 11, 2010	WISE	WISE	·	3.7 km	MPC; JPL
306128 Pipher	2010 JP_{109}	Pipher	May 12, 2010	WISE	WISE	·	4.9 km	MPC; JPL
306129	2010 JT_{110}	—	May 7, 2010	Mount Lemmon	Mount Lemmon Survey	V	810 m	MPC; JPL
306130	2010 JZ_{111}	—	May 12, 2010	Kitt Peak	Spacewatch	PAD	3.4 km	MPC; JPL
306131	2010 JT_{112}	—	May 13, 1999	Socorro	LINEAR	·	1.7 km	MPC; JPL
306132	2010 JU_{114}	—	May 6, 2010	Mount Lemmon	Mount Lemmon Survey	·	2.7 km	MPC; JPL
306133	2010 JY_{115}	—	May 4, 2010	Siding Spring	SSS	·	1.5 km	MPC; JPL
306134	2010 JO_{121}	—	May 12, 2010	Mount Lemmon	Mount Lemmon Survey	·	880 m	MPC; JPL
306135	2010 JA_{129}	—	May 13, 2010	WISE	WISE	·	1.9 km	MPC; JPL
306136	2010 JP_{135}	—	May 14, 2010	WISE	WISE	·	4.5 km	MPC; JPL
306137	2010 JP_{148}	—	May 3, 2010	Kitt Peak	Spacewatch	EUN	2.0 km	MPC; JPL
306138	2010 JM_{153}	—	March 4, 2006	Kitt Peak	Spacewatch	NYS	1.3 km	MPC; JPL
306139	2010 JG_{174}	—	February 20, 2006	Kitt Peak	Spacewatch	·	1.1 km	MPC; JPL
306140	2010 KW_{8}	—	May 17, 2010	Nogales	Tenagra II	·	4.3 km	MPC; JPL
306141	2010 KN_{10}	—	May 18, 2010	Siding Spring	SSS	·	1 km	MPC; JPL
306142	2010 KX_{14}	—	May 17, 2010	WISE	WISE	EOS ·	4.7 km	MPC; JPL
306143	2010 KK_{17}	—	May 17, 2010	WISE	WISE	URS	4.9 km	MPC; JPL
306144	2010 KY_{35}	—	May 21, 2010	Catalina	CSS	BAR	2.3 km	MPC; JPL
306145	2010 KT_{36}	—	May 19, 2010	Kitt Peak	Spacewatch	·	2.3 km	MPC; JPL
306146	2010 KX_{38}	—	November 28, 1999	Kitt Peak	Spacewatch	·	1.1 km	MPC; JPL
306147	2010 KE_{54}	—	November 1, 2006	Mount Lemmon	Mount Lemmon Survey	·	4.9 km	MPC; JPL
306148	2010 KZ_{61}	—	May 21, 2010	Catalina	CSS	·	1.7 km	MPC; JPL
306149	2010 KC_{62}	—	May 17, 2010	Mount Lemmon	Mount Lemmon Survey	·	1.0 km	MPC; JPL
306150	2010 KM_{62}	—	May 21, 2010	Catalina	CSS	·	1.9 km	MPC; JPL
306151	2010 KV_{78}	—	May 25, 2010	WISE	WISE	·	3.0 km	MPC; JPL
306152	2010 KH_{98}	—	May 28, 2010	WISE	WISE	·	4.1 km	MPC; JPL
306153	2010 KV_{117}	—	May 19, 2010	La Sagra	OAM	(18466)	2.7 km	MPC; JPL
306154	2010 KY_{117}	—	May 21, 2010	Catalina	CSS	·	1.4 km	MPC; JPL
306155	2010 KL_{127}	—	July 3, 2005	Palomar	NEAT	TIR	3.8 km	MPC; JPL
306156	2010 KX_{127}	—	May 21, 2010	Catalina	CSS	RAF	1.3 km	MPC; JPL
306157	2010 LC	—	June 1, 2010	Nogales	Tenagra II	·	3.2 km	MPC; JPL
306158	2010 LO_{14}	—	June 3, 2010	Kitt Peak	Spacewatch	·	1.5 km	MPC; JPL
306159	2010 LS_{34}	—	June 1, 2003	Cerro Tololo	Deep Ecliptic Survey	·	1.6 km	MPC; JPL
306160	2010 LO_{60}	—	June 4, 2010	Nogales	Tenagra II	·	1.4 km	MPC; JPL
306161	2010 LJ_{63}	—	June 1, 2010	Catalina	CSS	·	2.2 km	MPC; JPL
306162	2010 LR_{104}	—	June 13, 2010	Kitt Peak	Spacewatch	·	1.7 km	MPC; JPL
306163	2010 MU_{2}	—	June 21, 2010	Nogales	Tenagra II	MAR	1.5 km	MPC; JPL
306164	2010 ML_{68}	—	June 25, 2010	WISE	WISE	·	1.4 km	MPC; JPL
306165	2010 MF_{84}	—	June 27, 2010	WISE	WISE	·	3.0 km	MPC; JPL
306166	2010 MB_{100}	—	June 29, 2010	WISE	WISE	3:2	5.2 km	MPC; JPL
306167	2010 MP_{107}	—	July 3, 2005	Catalina	CSS	BRA	2.4 km	MPC; JPL
306168	2010 ME_{113}	—	June 20, 2010	Mount Lemmon	Mount Lemmon Survey	EUN	1.5 km	MPC; JPL
306169	2010 NJ	—	July 5, 2010	Kitt Peak	Spacewatch	BAR	1.7 km	MPC; JPL
306170	2010 NP_{4}	—	July 5, 2010	Mount Lemmon	Mount Lemmon Survey	·	2.4 km	MPC; JPL
306171	2010 NS_{4}	—	July 5, 2010	Mount Lemmon	Mount Lemmon Survey	·	1.6 km	MPC; JPL
306172	2010 NA_{9}	—	July 4, 2010	WISE	WISE	·	2.4 km	MPC; JPL
306173	2010 NK_{83}	—	July 1, 2010	WISE	WISE	T_{j} (2.58) · unusual	12 km	MPC; JPL
306174	2010 OD_{77}	—	December 2, 2005	Catalina	CSS	EUP	5.2 km	MPC; JPL
306175	2010 TQ_{24}	—	November 9, 2007	Mount Lemmon	Mount Lemmon Survey	·	1.0 km	MPC; JPL
306176	2010 TH_{138}	—	December 5, 2007	Kitt Peak	Spacewatch	·	790 m	MPC; JPL
306177	2010 US_{82}	—	June 13, 2005	Mount Lemmon	Mount Lemmon Survey	L4	10 km	MPC; JPL
306178	2010 WR_{11}	—	March 13, 2002	Palomar	NEAT	L4	10 km	MPC; JPL
306179	2010 WA_{55}	—	April 2, 2003	Cerro Tololo	Deep Lens Survey	L4	8.7 km	MPC; JPL
306180	2011 AL_{67}	—	November 14, 1995	Kitt Peak	Spacewatch	MAS	780 m	MPC; JPL
306181	2011 CE_{71}	—	October 21, 2006	Kitt Peak	Spacewatch	·	730 m	MPC; JPL
306182	2011 DF_{19}	—	March 17, 2004	Catalina	CSS	·	1.7 km	MPC; JPL
306183	2011 FM_{3}	—	January 15, 2004	Kitt Peak	Spacewatch	·	820 m	MPC; JPL
306184	2011 FP_{17}	—	November 6, 2005	Mount Lemmon	Mount Lemmon Survey	·	2.2 km	MPC; JPL
306185	2011 FK_{132}	—	October 26, 2000	Kitt Peak	Spacewatch	·	2.8 km	MPC; JPL
306186	2011 KR_{15}	—	November 12, 2007	Catalina	CSS	·	3.5 km	MPC; JPL
306187	2011 KS_{15}	—	June 12, 2000	Anderson Mesa	LONEOS	·	7.6 km	MPC; JPL
306188	2011 NJ	—	March 4, 2005	Kitt Peak	Spacewatch	·	3.0 km	MPC; JPL
306189	2011 NS_{3}	—	November 1, 2002	Palomar	NEAT	·	2.6 km	MPC; JPL
306190	2011 NV_{3}	—	January 2, 2009	Mount Lemmon	Mount Lemmon Survey	·	1.2 km	MPC; JPL
306191 Lentegábor	2011 OT_{12}	Lentegábor	December 28, 2008	Piszkéstető	K. Sárneczky	MAS	1.0 km	MPC; JPL
306192	2011 OE_{45}	—	December 2, 2008	Kitt Peak	Spacewatch	·	4.5 km	MPC; JPL
306193	2011 OU_{48}	—	November 2, 2008	Mount Lemmon	Mount Lemmon Survey	·	1.5 km	MPC; JPL
306194	2011 PV	—	November 26, 2009	Mount Lemmon	Mount Lemmon Survey	H	660 m	MPC; JPL
306195	2011 PP_{1}	—	November 20, 2000	Kitt Peak	Spacewatch	NYS	1.3 km	MPC; JPL
306196	2011 PJ_{8}	—	March 8, 2005	Mount Lemmon	Mount Lemmon Survey	AGN	1.5 km	MPC; JPL
306197	2011 PQ_{8}	—	September 18, 2007	Catalina	CSS	·	2.0 km	MPC; JPL
306198	2011 PF_{10}	—	July 29, 2005	Palomar	NEAT	·	4.1 km	MPC; JPL
306199	2011 QV_{1}	—	February 12, 2008	Kitt Peak	Spacewatch	CYB	4.5 km	MPC; JPL
306200	2011 QM_{3}	—	March 12, 2008	Kitt Peak	Spacewatch	L5	10 km	MPC; JPL

== 306201–306300 ==
back to top

Designation			Discovery			Properties		Ref
Permanent	Provisional	Named after	Date	Site	Discoverer(s)	Category	Diam.	Ref
306201	2011 QV_{5}	—	April 21, 2006	Catalina	CSS	fast	1.6 km	MPC; JPL
306202	2011 QY_{6}	—	January 31, 2009	Mount Lemmon	Mount Lemmon Survey	HIL · 3:2	5.8 km	MPC; JPL
306203	2011 QO_{10}	—	July 13, 2007	Dauban	Kugel, F.	·	1.5 km	MPC; JPL
306204	2011 QV_{10}	—	July 12, 2005	Mount Lemmon	Mount Lemmon Survey	·	3.7 km	MPC; JPL
306205	2011 QK_{13}	—	October 23, 1997	Kitt Peak	Spacewatch	·	930 m	MPC; JPL
306206	2011 QH_{16}	—	October 3, 2002	Socorro	LINEAR	·	1.6 km	MPC; JPL
306207	2011 QV_{16}	—	September 5, 2002	Socorro	LINEAR	·	2.0 km	MPC; JPL
306208	2011 QK_{17}	—	August 23, 2004	Kitt Peak	Spacewatch	·	690 m	MPC; JPL
306209	2011 QZ_{18}	—	April 5, 2003	Kitt Peak	Spacewatch	·	3.6 km	MPC; JPL
306210	2011 QR_{24}	—	May 16, 1998	Kitt Peak	Spacewatch	·	1.2 km	MPC; JPL
306211	2011 QO_{25}	—	February 1, 2009	Kitt Peak	Spacewatch	HOF	3.0 km	MPC; JPL
306212	2011 QX_{25}	—	September 7, 2000	Kitt Peak	Spacewatch	·	1.3 km	MPC; JPL
306213	2011 QZ_{30}	—	October 8, 2004	Anderson Mesa	LONEOS	V	810 m	MPC; JPL
306214	2011 QC_{32}	—	October 31, 2000	Socorro	LINEAR	NYS	1.9 km	MPC; JPL
306215	2011 QH_{32}	—	November 4, 2004	Kitt Peak	Spacewatch	3:2 · SHU	5.5 km	MPC; JPL
306216	2011 QN_{32}	—	November 23, 2003	Kitt Peak	Spacewatch	·	1.7 km	MPC; JPL
306217	2011 QN_{37}	—	November 1, 2000	Socorro	LINEAR	·	1.6 km	MPC; JPL
306218	2011 QR_{37}	—	April 5, 2003	Kitt Peak	Spacewatch	V	890 m	MPC; JPL
306219	2011 QT_{37}	—	January 11, 2008	Mount Lemmon	Mount Lemmon Survey	·	1.8 km	MPC; JPL
306220	2011 QS_{40}	—	May 23, 2006	Siding Spring	SSS	EUN ·	2.2 km	MPC; JPL
306221	2011 QJ_{44}	—	August 16, 2002	Haleakala	NEAT	·	4.6 km	MPC; JPL
306222	2011 QX_{49}	—	September 8, 2001	Socorro	LINEAR	·	750 m	MPC; JPL
306223	2011 QE_{50}	—	October 16, 1977	Palomar	C. J. van Houten, I. van Houten-Groeneveld, T. Gehrels	·	3.2 km	MPC; JPL
306224	2011 QC_{51}	—	September 29, 2000	Kitt Peak	Spacewatch	·	1.3 km	MPC; JPL
306225	2011 QH_{55}	—	September 13, 2004	Kitt Peak	Spacewatch	V	650 m	MPC; JPL
306226	2011 QZ_{55}	—	August 28, 2006	Catalina	CSS	KOR	1.8 km	MPC; JPL
306227	2011 QQ_{58}	—	November 5, 2007	Kitt Peak	Spacewatch	·	2.3 km	MPC; JPL
306228	2011 QM_{60}	—	October 7, 2000	Anderson Mesa	LONEOS	·	4.6 km	MPC; JPL
306229	2011 QG_{61}	—	October 16, 1977	Palomar	C. J. van Houten, I. van Houten-Groeneveld, T. Gehrels	·	4.4 km	MPC; JPL
306230	2011 QM_{61}	—	April 11, 1996	Kitt Peak	Spacewatch	TIN	2.8 km	MPC; JPL
306231	2011 QR_{62}	—	August 31, 2000	Kitt Peak	Spacewatch	·	1.3 km	MPC; JPL
306232	2011 QS_{62}	—	February 17, 2010	Kitt Peak	Spacewatch	NYS	1.3 km	MPC; JPL
306233	2011 QU_{62}	—	March 24, 2001	Kitt Peak	Spacewatch	·	1.9 km	MPC; JPL
306234	2011 QT_{64}	—	February 27, 2003	Kleť	M. Tichý, Kočer, M.	·	730 m	MPC; JPL
306235	2011 QZ_{64}	—	December 16, 2007	Mount Lemmon	Mount Lemmon Survey	·	3.3 km	MPC; JPL
306236	2011 QR_{67}	—	March 12, 2005	Kitt Peak	Spacewatch	·	2.6 km	MPC; JPL
306237	2011 QV_{67}	—	December 11, 2004	Campo Imperatore	CINEOS	MAS	1.2 km	MPC; JPL
306238	2011 QW_{67}	—	July 10, 2005	Siding Spring	SSS	·	3.9 km	MPC; JPL
306239	2011 QS_{68}	—	September 21, 2000	Kitt Peak	Spacewatch	·	3.3 km	MPC; JPL
306240	2011 QV_{68}	—	February 9, 2005	La Silla	A. Boattini, H. Scholl	·	3.1 km	MPC; JPL
306241	2011 QV_{70}	—	April 6, 2005	Catalina	CSS	HNS	1.5 km	MPC; JPL
306242	2011 QB_{71}	—	August 13, 2002	Socorro	LINEAR	·	2.2 km	MPC; JPL
306243	2011 QW_{71}	—	August 10, 2005	Siding Spring	SSS	T_{j} (2.98)	4.3 km	MPC; JPL
306244	2011 QL_{72}	—	September 5, 2000	Socorro	LINEAR	V	1.0 km	MPC; JPL
306245	2011 QF_{76}	—	March 20, 1999	Apache Point	SDSS	·	2.7 km	MPC; JPL
306246	2011 QK_{76}	—	January 31, 2009	Mount Lemmon	Mount Lemmon Survey	HOF	3.0 km	MPC; JPL
306247	2011 QM_{76}	—	August 31, 2000	Socorro	LINEAR	MAS	770 m	MPC; JPL
306248	2011 QG_{78}	—	May 11, 2010	Mount Lemmon	Mount Lemmon Survey	·	2.5 km	MPC; JPL
306249	2011 QE_{85}	—	April 26, 2003	Kitt Peak	Spacewatch	·	1.1 km	MPC; JPL
306250	2011 QC_{88}	—	August 31, 2000	Kitt Peak	Spacewatch	·	2.9 km	MPC; JPL
306251	2011 QY_{89}	—	January 13, 2005	Kitt Peak	Spacewatch	·	4.2 km	MPC; JPL
306252	2011 QA_{95}	—	February 25, 2006	Mount Lemmon	Mount Lemmon Survey	·	2.1 km	MPC; JPL
306253	2011 QU_{95}	—	February 9, 2005	Kitt Peak	Spacewatch	·	2.3 km	MPC; JPL
306254	2011 QX_{95}	—	March 4, 2001	Kitt Peak	Spacewatch	TIN	1.2 km	MPC; JPL
306255	2011 RR_{2}	—	October 15, 2007	Kitt Peak	Spacewatch	MRX	2.6 km	MPC; JPL
306256	2011 RS_{2}	—	March 24, 2003	Kitt Peak	Spacewatch	NYS	910 m	MPC; JPL
306257 Janethunten	2011 RF_{3}	Janethunten	May 25, 2006	Mauna Kea	P. A. Wiegert	·	1.1 km	MPC; JPL
306258	2011 RG_{3}	—	March 24, 2003	Kitt Peak	Spacewatch	VER	3.7 km	MPC; JPL
306259	2011 RT_{3}	—	April 12, 1996	Kitt Peak	Spacewatch	·	2.1 km	MPC; JPL
306260	2011 RB_{4}	—	August 31, 2000	Socorro	LINEAR	·	3.0 km	MPC; JPL
306261	2011 RL_{6}	—	February 3, 2009	Kitt Peak	Spacewatch	·	2.7 km	MPC; JPL
306262	2011 RR_{8}	—	September 21, 2001	Kitt Peak	Spacewatch	·	2.2 km	MPC; JPL
306263	2011 RC_{11}	—	January 16, 2008	Kitt Peak	Spacewatch	·	3.3 km	MPC; JPL
306264	2011 RM_{11}	—	July 19, 2002	Palomar	NEAT	·	2.0 km	MPC; JPL
306265	2011 RX_{11}	—	March 31, 2004	Kitt Peak	Spacewatch	·	2.3 km	MPC; JPL
306266	2011 RB_{12}	—	March 25, 2006	Mount Lemmon	Mount Lemmon Survey	·	1.4 km	MPC; JPL
306267	2011 RG_{12}	—	September 25, 2006	Mount Lemmon	Mount Lemmon Survey	KOR	1.5 km	MPC; JPL
306268	2011 RU_{12}	—	January 25, 2009	Kitt Peak	Spacewatch	·	1.7 km	MPC; JPL
306269	2011 RT_{14}	—	August 2, 2000	Socorro	LINEAR	·	1.6 km	MPC; JPL
306270	2011 SL	—	April 16, 2005	Kitt Peak	Spacewatch	HOF	2.9 km	MPC; JPL
306271	2011 SG_{3}	—	March 12, 2005	Kitt Peak	Spacewatch	GEF	1.7 km	MPC; JPL
306272	2011 SJ_{3}	—	September 26, 1998	Socorro	LINEAR	·	2.2 km	MPC; JPL
306273	2011 SZ_{6}	—	September 28, 2006	Kitt Peak	Spacewatch	·	2.2 km	MPC; JPL
306274	2011 SM_{7}	—	October 24, 2000	Socorro	LINEAR	·	1.6 km	MPC; JPL
306275	2011 SW_{7}	—	October 21, 1995	Kitt Peak	Spacewatch	·	2.9 km	MPC; JPL
306276	2011 SE_{8}	—	March 21, 1999	Apache Point	SDSS	·	2.3 km	MPC; JPL
306277	2011 SF_{8}	—	September 24, 2000	Socorro	LINEAR	·	3.1 km	MPC; JPL
306278	2011 SH_{12}	—	September 28, 2000	Socorro	LINEAR	·	4.7 km	MPC; JPL
306279	2011 ST_{15}	—	August 26, 2005	Palomar	NEAT	·	3.3 km	MPC; JPL
306280	2011 SO_{22}	—	April 6, 2006	Siding Spring	SSS	·	2.5 km	MPC; JPL
306281	2011 SM_{23}	—	May 29, 2003	Socorro	LINEAR	·	1.7 km	MPC; JPL
306282	2011 SX_{24}	—	October 19, 2003	Kitt Peak	Spacewatch	·	1.1 km	MPC; JPL
306283	2011 SW_{25}	—	April 16, 1994	Kitt Peak	Spacewatch	·	1.5 km	MPC; JPL
306284	2011 SV_{26}	—	July 15, 2007	Siding Spring	SSS	PHO	1.5 km	MPC; JPL
306285	2011 SW_{26}	—	September 18, 1993	Kitt Peak	Spacewatch	·	1.4 km	MPC; JPL
306286	2011 SU_{27}	—	June 16, 2007	Kitt Peak	Spacewatch	NYS	1.5 km	MPC; JPL
306287	2011 SX_{27}	—	April 2, 2006	Kitt Peak	Spacewatch	NYS	1.7 km	MPC; JPL
306288	2011 SM_{28}	—	August 23, 1998	Anderson Mesa	LONEOS	·	1.2 km	MPC; JPL
306289	2011 SO_{28}	—	May 22, 2001	Kitt Peak	Spacewatch	·	2.7 km	MPC; JPL
306290	2011 SE_{29}	—	February 25, 2006	Kitt Peak	Spacewatch	·	1.8 km	MPC; JPL
306291	2011 SS_{32}	—	September 10, 2007	Kitt Peak	Spacewatch	·	2.1 km	MPC; JPL
306292	2011 SU_{32}	—	March 12, 2002	Palomar	NEAT	·	1.9 km	MPC; JPL
306293	2011 SG_{33}	—	December 29, 2008	Kitt Peak	Spacewatch	MAS	910 m	MPC; JPL
306294	2011 SA_{37}	—	January 31, 2006	Kitt Peak	Spacewatch	NYS	1.3 km	MPC; JPL
306295	2011 SO_{40}	—	August 27, 2005	Anderson Mesa	LONEOS	·	3.7 km	MPC; JPL
306296	2011 SD_{44}	—	August 19, 2006	Kitt Peak	Spacewatch	KOR	1.4 km	MPC; JPL
306297	2011 SU_{49}	—	November 29, 2000	Socorro	LINEAR	TIR	3.8 km	MPC; JPL
306298	2011 SF_{53}	—	April 4, 2003	Kitt Peak	Spacewatch	·	5.2 km	MPC; JPL
306299	2011 SN_{53}	—	October 21, 1995	Kitt Peak	Spacewatch	·	2.9 km	MPC; JPL
306300	2011 SG_{58}	—	September 24, 2000	Socorro	LINEAR	·	4.2 km	MPC; JPL

== 306301–306400 ==
back to top

Designation			Discovery			Properties		Ref
Permanent	Provisional	Named after	Date	Site	Discoverer(s)	Category	Diam.	Ref
306301	2011 SH_{58}	—	February 22, 2004	Kitt Peak	Spacewatch	HOF	3.8 km	MPC; JPL
306302	2011 SO_{58}	—	April 11, 2005	Mount Lemmon	Mount Lemmon Survey	·	1.7 km	MPC; JPL
306303	2011 SR_{63}	—	November 19, 2000	Kitt Peak	Spacewatch	·	1.9 km	MPC; JPL
306304	2011 SY_{64}	—	April 2, 2005	Mount Lemmon	Mount Lemmon Survey	·	1.8 km	MPC; JPL
306305	2011 SQ_{65}	—	October 5, 2002	Palomar	NEAT	ADE	2.6 km	MPC; JPL
306306	2011 SV_{65}	—	July 11, 2005	Catalina	CSS	·	4.0 km	MPC; JPL
306307	2011 SD_{70}	—	January 19, 2004	Kitt Peak	Spacewatch	·	2.4 km	MPC; JPL
306308	2011 SL_{70}	—	February 24, 2006	Kitt Peak	Spacewatch	·	1.3 km	MPC; JPL
306309	2011 SH_{71}	—	September 23, 2006	San Marcello	San Marcello	·	2.1 km	MPC; JPL
306310	2011 SX_{77}	—	September 26, 2000	Haleakala	NEAT	·	3.4 km	MPC; JPL
306311	2011 SM_{79}	—	September 30, 2006	Mount Lemmon	Mount Lemmon Survey	·	3.6 km	MPC; JPL
306312	2011 SZ_{80}	—	August 30, 2005	Kitt Peak	Spacewatch	·	3.7 km	MPC; JPL
306313	2011 SA_{84}	—	October 7, 1996	Prescott	P. G. Comba	·	1.2 km	MPC; JPL
306314	2011 ST_{85}	—	May 7, 2005	Kitt Peak	Spacewatch	AEO	1.5 km	MPC; JPL
306315	2011 SX_{87}	—	August 26, 2005	Palomar	NEAT	·	2.9 km	MPC; JPL
306316	2011 SC_{89}	—	July 20, 2007	Lulin	LUSS	·	1.3 km	MPC; JPL
306317	2011 SE_{90}	—	October 17, 1995	Kitt Peak	Spacewatch	·	3.3 km	MPC; JPL
306318	2011 SL_{90}	—	August 11, 1997	Kitt Peak	Spacewatch	·	2.1 km	MPC; JPL
306319	2011 SZ_{91}	—	October 4, 2002	Palomar	NEAT	·	2.0 km	MPC; JPL
306320	2011 SS_{96}	—	February 27, 2006	Mount Lemmon	Mount Lemmon Survey	NYS	1.3 km	MPC; JPL
306321	2011 SS_{97}	—	October 22, 2006	Catalina	CSS	EMA	3.8 km	MPC; JPL
306322	2011 SA_{98}	—	February 13, 2008	Mount Lemmon	Mount Lemmon Survey	EOS	2.1 km	MPC; JPL
306323	2011 SP_{98}	—	March 8, 2005	Mount Lemmon	Mount Lemmon Survey	·	1.8 km	MPC; JPL
306324	2011 SD_{101}	—	March 18, 2004	Kitt Peak	Spacewatch	KOR	1.6 km	MPC; JPL
306325	2011 SN_{102}	—	August 14, 2001	Palomar	NEAT	·	3.7 km	MPC; JPL
306326	2011 SQ_{103}	—	October 1, 2000	Socorro	LINEAR	·	4.0 km	MPC; JPL
306327	2011 SA_{106}	—	October 5, 2004	Kitt Peak	Spacewatch	·	810 m	MPC; JPL
306328	2011 SX_{106}	—	January 15, 2005	Pla D'Arguines	R. Ferrando	MAS	1.0 km	MPC; JPL
306329	2011 SW_{110}	—	April 29, 2003	Haleakala	NEAT	·	1.5 km	MPC; JPL
306330	2011 SR_{112}	—	October 24, 2000	Socorro	LINEAR	·	1.6 km	MPC; JPL
306331	2011 SH_{115}	—	September 20, 2001	Socorro	LINEAR	·	2.7 km	MPC; JPL
306332	2011 SF_{117}	—	August 10, 2007	Kitt Peak	Spacewatch	NYS	960 m	MPC; JPL
306333	2011 SB_{119}	—	February 18, 2010	Mount Lemmon	Mount Lemmon Survey	·	1.4 km	MPC; JPL
306334	2011 SF_{119}	—	October 1, 2000	Socorro	LINEAR	·	1.3 km	MPC; JPL
306335	2011 SL_{121}	—	January 18, 2005	Kitt Peak	Spacewatch	NYS	1.1 km	MPC; JPL
306336	2011 SU_{121}	—	August 25, 2001	Socorro	LINEAR	·	670 m	MPC; JPL
306337	2011 ST_{123}	—	October 1, 2000	Socorro	LINEAR	THM	2.6 km	MPC; JPL
306338	2011 SH_{129}	—	September 30, 2000	Kitt Peak	Spacewatch	THM	2.5 km	MPC; JPL
306339	2011 SQ_{129}	—	January 5, 2003	Kitt Peak	Deep Lens Survey	·	830 m	MPC; JPL
306340	2011 SB_{134}	—	September 13, 2007	Mount Lemmon	Mount Lemmon Survey	MAS	850 m	MPC; JPL
306341	2011 SV_{135}	—	November 11, 2004	Kitt Peak	Spacewatch	·	1.1 km	MPC; JPL
306342	2011 SN_{136}	—	October 1, 2003	Kitt Peak	Spacewatch	·	1.4 km	MPC; JPL
306343	2011 SM_{141}	—	November 1, 2000	Socorro	LINEAR	·	1.5 km	MPC; JPL
306344	2011 SW_{146}	—	May 8, 2005	Kitt Peak	Spacewatch	(12739)	1.7 km	MPC; JPL
306345	2011 SP_{151}	—	September 18, 2001	Kitt Peak	Spacewatch	KOR	1.6 km	MPC; JPL
306346	2011 SX_{162}	—	August 7, 2004	Palomar	NEAT	·	760 m	MPC; JPL
306347	2011 SP_{165}	—	August 27, 2005	Anderson Mesa	LONEOS	·	3.1 km	MPC; JPL
306348	2011 SG_{168}	—	September 24, 2000	Socorro	LINEAR	EOS	2.5 km	MPC; JPL
306349	2011 SK_{170}	—	September 21, 2000	Kitt Peak	Spacewatch	NYS	1.1 km	MPC; JPL
306350	2011 SQ_{175}	—	April 5, 2000	Socorro	LINEAR	·	2.2 km	MPC; JPL
306351	2011 ST_{175}	—	April 8, 2002	Kitt Peak	Spacewatch	·	1.2 km	MPC; JPL
306352	2011 SW_{177}	—	September 10, 2007	Mount Lemmon	Mount Lemmon Survey	NYS	1.2 km	MPC; JPL
306353	2011 SY_{178}	—	October 4, 2002	Palomar	NEAT	NEM	2.2 km	MPC; JPL
306354	2011 ST_{193}	—	October 1, 2000	Socorro	LINEAR	·	2.9 km	MPC; JPL
306355	2011 SF_{194}	—	October 2, 2000	Socorro	LINEAR	·	4.2 km	MPC; JPL
306356	2011 SB_{196}	—	February 22, 2002	Palomar	NEAT	NYS	1.1 km	MPC; JPL
306357	2011 SS_{201}	—	August 6, 2002	Palomar	NEAT	·	1.9 km	MPC; JPL
306358	2011 SC_{204}	—	October 17, 2001	Socorro	LINEAR	·	660 m	MPC; JPL
306359	2011 SU_{205}	—	January 18, 2008	Mount Lemmon	Mount Lemmon Survey	EOS	2.6 km	MPC; JPL
306360	2011 SB_{206}	—	September 10, 2007	Mount Lemmon	Mount Lemmon Survey	·	2.6 km	MPC; JPL
306361	2011 SR_{217}	—	September 24, 2000	Socorro	LINEAR	·	3.3 km	MPC; JPL
306362	2011 SG_{218}	—	August 7, 2002	Palomar	NEAT	·	1.7 km	MPC; JPL
306363	2011 SJ_{220}	—	December 2, 2004	Kitt Peak	Spacewatch	·	1.4 km	MPC; JPL
306364	2011 TD	—	February 13, 2004	Kitt Peak	Spacewatch	·	2.9 km	MPC; JPL
306365	2233 P-L	—	September 24, 1960	Palomar	C. J. van Houten, I. van Houten-Groeneveld, T. Gehrels	·	1.4 km	MPC; JPL
306366	2842 P-L	—	September 24, 1960	Palomar	C. J. van Houten, I. van Houten-Groeneveld, T. Gehrels	NYS	1.2 km	MPC; JPL
306367 Nut	5025 P-L	Nut	October 22, 1960	Palomar	C. J. van Houten, I. van Houten-Groeneveld, T. Gehrels	T_{j} (2.99) · APO +1km	2.6 km	MPC; JPL
306368	6259 P-L	—	September 24, 1960	Palomar	C. J. van Houten, I. van Houten-Groeneveld, T. Gehrels	·	1.6 km	MPC; JPL
306369	6883 P-L	—	September 24, 1960	Palomar	C. J. van Houten, I. van Houten-Groeneveld, T. Gehrels	·	1.2 km	MPC; JPL
306370	3154 T-1	—	March 26, 1971	Palomar	C. J. van Houten, I. van Houten-Groeneveld, T. Gehrels	·	2.6 km	MPC; JPL
306371	4282 T-2	—	September 29, 1973	Palomar	C. J. van Houten, I. van Houten-Groeneveld, T. Gehrels	·	1.6 km	MPC; JPL
306372	4285 T-2	—	September 29, 1973	Palomar	C. J. van Houten, I. van Houten-Groeneveld, T. Gehrels	·	4.4 km	MPC; JPL
306373	1125 T-3	—	October 17, 1977	Palomar	C. J. van Houten, I. van Houten-Groeneveld, T. Gehrels	·	3.2 km	MPC; JPL
306374	3362 T-3	—	October 16, 1977	Palomar	C. J. van Houten, I. van Houten-Groeneveld, T. Gehrels	NYS	1.4 km	MPC; JPL
306375	1980 RG_{1}	—	September 13, 1980	Palomar	C. T. Kowal	·	2.1 km	MPC; JPL
306376	1983 TA	—	October 1, 1983	Siding Spring	K. S. Russell	·	2.0 km	MPC; JPL
306377	1990 WK_{1}	—	November 18, 1990	La Silla	E. W. Elst	·	1.5 km	MPC; JPL
306378	1992 RU_{5}	—	September 2, 1992	La Silla	E. W. Elst	NYS	1.7 km	MPC; JPL
306379	1993 BG_{10}	—	January 22, 1993	Kitt Peak	Spacewatch	·	1.4 km	MPC; JPL
306380	1993 PH	—	August 13, 1993	Kitt Peak	Spacewatch	·	2.4 km	MPC; JPL
306381	1993 RR_{2}	—	September 14, 1993	Palomar	E. F. Helin	slow	3.0 km	MPC; JPL
306382	1993 SL_{9}	—	September 22, 1993	La Silla	H. Debehogne, E. W. Elst	V	1.1 km	MPC; JPL
306383	1993 VD	—	November 9, 1993	Kitt Peak	Spacewatch	ATE · PHA · fast	180 m	MPC; JPL
306384	1994 AB_{9}	—	January 8, 1994	Kitt Peak	Spacewatch	NYS	1.2 km	MPC; JPL
306385	1994 AE_{10}	—	January 8, 1994	Kitt Peak	Spacewatch	·	1.3 km	MPC; JPL
306386 Carlofavetti	1994 CF	Carlofavetti	February 6, 1994	Farra d'Isonzo	Farra d'Isonzo	·	1.6 km	MPC; JPL
306387	1994 GR_{8}	—	April 5, 1994	Kitt Peak	S. M. Larson, C. W. Hergenrother	KOR	1.4 km	MPC; JPL
306388	1994 JX_{7}	—	May 8, 1994	Kitt Peak	Spacewatch	·	3.2 km	MPC; JPL
306389	1994 PO_{3}	—	August 10, 1994	La Silla	E. W. Elst	·	3.1 km	MPC; JPL
306390	1994 SM_{8}	—	September 28, 1994	Kitt Peak	Spacewatch	·	1.3 km	MPC; JPL
306391	1994 VB_{5}	—	November 5, 1994	Kitt Peak	Spacewatch	·	2.1 km	MPC; JPL
306392	1995 HW_{1}	—	April 24, 1995	Kitt Peak	Spacewatch	PHO	1.3 km	MPC; JPL
306393	1995 MO_{2}	—	June 24, 1995	Kitt Peak	Spacewatch	·	1.8 km	MPC; JPL
306394	1995 QD_{12}	—	August 22, 1995	Kitt Peak	Spacewatch	·	3.1 km	MPC; JPL
306395	1995 SU_{51}	—	September 26, 1995	Kitt Peak	Spacewatch	T_{j} (2.96)	3.3 km	MPC; JPL
306396	1995 UZ_{22}	—	October 19, 1995	Kitt Peak	Spacewatch	EOS	2.2 km	MPC; JPL
306397	1995 WW_{10}	—	November 16, 1995	Kitt Peak	Spacewatch	·	2.3 km	MPC; JPL
306398	1995 XJ_{3}	—	December 14, 1995	Kitt Peak	Spacewatch	·	1.5 km	MPC; JPL
306399	1996 AX_{1}	—	January 14, 1996	Farra d'Isonzo	Farra d'Isonzo	·	2.5 km	MPC; JPL
306400	1996 AX_{16}	—	January 13, 1996	Kitt Peak	Spacewatch	(5)	1.9 km	MPC; JPL

== 306401–306500 ==
back to top

Designation			Discovery			Properties		Ref
Permanent	Provisional	Named after	Date	Site	Discoverer(s)	Category	Diam.	Ref
306401	1996 JH_{4}	—	May 9, 1996	Kitt Peak	Spacewatch	·	810 m	MPC; JPL
306402	1996 SM_{2}	—	September 17, 1996	Kitt Peak	Spacewatch	KOR	1.2 km	MPC; JPL
306403	1996 TM_{31}	—	October 8, 1996	Kitt Peak	Spacewatch	NYS	1.2 km	MPC; JPL
306404	1996 TJ_{34}	—	October 10, 1996	Kitt Peak	Spacewatch	NYS	1.4 km	MPC; JPL
306405	1996 VY_{9}	—	November 3, 1996	Kitt Peak	Spacewatch	·	2.6 km	MPC; JPL
306406	1996 VK_{26}	—	November 11, 1996	Kitt Peak	Spacewatch	·	2.3 km	MPC; JPL
306407	1996 XO_{6}	—	December 1, 1996	Kitt Peak	Spacewatch	·	1.8 km	MPC; JPL
306408	1996 XF_{8}	—	December 1, 1996	Kitt Peak	Spacewatch	V	950 m	MPC; JPL
306409	1996 XU_{17}	—	December 7, 1996	Kitt Peak	Spacewatch	NYS	900 m	MPC; JPL
306410	1996 XV_{23}	—	December 4, 1996	Kitt Peak	Spacewatch	ERI	2.0 km	MPC; JPL
306411	1997 FY_{4}	—	March 30, 1997	Kitt Peak	Spacewatch	·	4.1 km	MPC; JPL
306412	1997 GY_{3}	—	April 7, 1997	Needville	Needville	·	1.0 km	MPC; JPL
306413	1997 GF_{22}	—	April 6, 1997	Socorro	LINEAR	·	1.6 km	MPC; JPL
306414	1997 WL_{14}	—	November 22, 1997	Kitt Peak	Spacewatch	·	660 m	MPC; JPL
306415	1997 YL_{11}	—	December 29, 1997	Haleakala	NEAT	·	1.3 km	MPC; JPL
306416	1998 HS_{7}	—	April 23, 1998	Socorro	LINEAR	·	2.9 km	MPC; JPL
306417	1998 HF_{9}	—	April 17, 1998	Kitt Peak	Spacewatch	·	2.3 km	MPC; JPL
306418	1998 KK_{56}	—	May 27, 1998	Socorro	LINEAR	T_{j} (2.85)	3.0 km	MPC; JPL
306419	1998 MS_{6}	—	June 20, 1998	Kitt Peak	Spacewatch	·	4.7 km	MPC; JPL
306420	1998 OO_{1}	—	May 28, 1998	Kitt Peak	Spacewatch	RAF	1.0 km	MPC; JPL
306421	1998 QB_{1}	—	August 17, 1998	Socorro	LINEAR	·	610 m	MPC; JPL
306422	1998 QU_{3}	—	August 17, 1998	Socorro	LINEAR	·	2.6 km	MPC; JPL
306423	1998 QR_{28}	—	August 22, 1998	Xinglong	SCAP	·	1.3 km	MPC; JPL
306424	1998 QV_{36}	—	August 17, 1998	Socorro	LINEAR	·	3.2 km	MPC; JPL
306425	1998 QF_{86}	—	August 24, 1998	Socorro	LINEAR	MAR	1.7 km	MPC; JPL
306426	1998 QR_{104}	—	August 26, 1998	La Silla	E. W. Elst	·	1.9 km	MPC; JPL
306427	1998 SZ_{5}	—	September 20, 1998	Kitt Peak	Spacewatch	·	2.7 km	MPC; JPL
306428	1998 SL_{16}	—	September 16, 1998	Kitt Peak	Spacewatch	·	1.9 km	MPC; JPL
306429	1998 ST_{45}	—	September 25, 1998	Kitt Peak	Spacewatch	(5)	1.2 km	MPC; JPL
306430	1998 SG_{48}	—	September 27, 1998	Kitt Peak	Spacewatch	·	920 m	MPC; JPL
306431	1998 SR_{49}	—	September 29, 1998	Socorro	LINEAR	AMO +1km	1.1 km	MPC; JPL
306432	1998 SD_{74}	—	September 21, 1998	La Silla	E. W. Elst	·	1.4 km	MPC; JPL
306433	1998 SK_{77}	—	September 26, 1998	Socorro	LINEAR	·	1.5 km	MPC; JPL
306434	1998 SP_{114}	—	September 26, 1998	Socorro	LINEAR	·	1.9 km	MPC; JPL
306435	1998 SP_{142}	—	September 26, 1998	Socorro	LINEAR	·	900 m	MPC; JPL
306436	1998 SB_{163}	—	September 26, 1998	Socorro	LINEAR	·	1.3 km	MPC; JPL
306437	1998 TV_{17}	—	October 14, 1998	Caussols	ODAS	·	1.3 km	MPC; JPL
306438	1998 UD_{1}	—	October 19, 1998	Catalina	CSS	T_{j} (2.98)	3.4 km	MPC; JPL
306439	1998 UG_{5}	—	October 22, 1998	Caussols	ODAS	·	1.4 km	MPC; JPL
306440	1998 UZ_{13}	—	October 23, 1998	Kitt Peak	Spacewatch	·	1.4 km	MPC; JPL
306441	1998 UV_{16}	—	October 27, 1998	Catalina	CSS	·	2.1 km	MPC; JPL
306442	1998 VR_{47}	—	November 15, 1998	Kitt Peak	Spacewatch	·	3.0 km	MPC; JPL
306443	1998 WL	—	November 16, 1998	Haleakala	NEAT	·	2.1 km	MPC; JPL
306444	1998 WT_{6}	—	November 24, 1998	Baton Rouge	W. R. Cooney Jr., P. M. Motl	·	1.2 km	MPC; JPL
306445	1998 WL_{27}	—	November 18, 1998	Kitt Peak	Spacewatch	·	2.2 km	MPC; JPL
306446	1998 WS_{32}	—	November 19, 1998	Anderson Mesa	LONEOS	·	1.5 km	MPC; JPL
306447	1998 WO_{34}	—	November 16, 1998	Kitt Peak	Spacewatch	·	1.8 km	MPC; JPL
306448	1998 XT	—	December 7, 1998	Caussols	ODAS	·	1.8 km	MPC; JPL
306449	1998 XL_{18}	—	December 8, 1998	Kitt Peak	Spacewatch	·	1.8 km	MPC; JPL
306450	1998 XY_{44}	—	December 14, 1998	Socorro	LINEAR	·	2.4 km	MPC; JPL
306451	1999 AW_{12}	—	January 7, 1999	Kitt Peak	Spacewatch	PAD	1.7 km	MPC; JPL
306452	1999 AC_{15}	—	January 8, 1999	Kitt Peak	Spacewatch	·	1.9 km	MPC; JPL
306453	1999 BE_{8}	—	January 22, 1999	Višnjan	K. Korlević	·	1.1 km	MPC; JPL
306454	1999 BG_{27}	—	January 16, 1999	Kitt Peak	Spacewatch	·	1.4 km	MPC; JPL
306455	1999 BF_{30}	—	January 19, 1999	Kitt Peak	Spacewatch	·	630 m	MPC; JPL
306456	1999 CW_{6}	—	February 10, 1999	Socorro	LINEAR	·	2.1 km	MPC; JPL
306457	1999 CR_{86}	—	February 10, 1999	Socorro	LINEAR	·	2.4 km	MPC; JPL
306458	1999 ER_{7}	—	March 12, 1999	Kitt Peak	Spacewatch	·	4.2 km	MPC; JPL
306459	1999 GS_{3}	—	April 9, 1999	Socorro	LINEAR	·	2.4 km	MPC; JPL
306460	1999 GD_{59}	—	April 12, 1999	Socorro	LINEAR	·	3.2 km	MPC; JPL
306461	1999 LY_{5}	—	June 11, 1999	Socorro	LINEAR	T_{j} (2.88)	5.5 km	MPC; JPL
306462	1999 RC_{32}	—	September 8, 1999	Socorro	LINEAR	AMO	480 m	MPC; JPL
306463	1999 RL_{40}	—	September 7, 1999	Socorro	LINEAR	H	790 m	MPC; JPL
306464	1999 RO_{44}	—	September 11, 1999	Socorro	LINEAR	·	3.8 km	MPC; JPL
306465	1999 RG_{75}	—	September 7, 1999	Socorro	LINEAR	·	3.3 km	MPC; JPL
306466	1999 RZ_{83}	—	September 7, 1999	Socorro	LINEAR	MAS	1.2 km	MPC; JPL
306467	1999 RL_{97}	—	September 7, 1999	Socorro	LINEAR	·	1.3 km	MPC; JPL
306468	1999 RF_{104}	—	September 8, 1999	Socorro	LINEAR	·	2.2 km	MPC; JPL
306469	1999 RC_{180}	—	September 9, 1999	Socorro	LINEAR	·	3.2 km	MPC; JPL
306470	1999 RF_{181}	—	September 9, 1999	Socorro	LINEAR	·	1.1 km	MPC; JPL
306471	1999 RU_{184}	—	September 9, 1999	Socorro	LINEAR	·	990 m	MPC; JPL
306472	1999 RK_{199}	—	September 8, 1999	Socorro	LINEAR	·	5.5 km	MPC; JPL
306473	1999 RZ_{202}	—	September 8, 1999	Socorro	LINEAR	MAR	1.2 km	MPC; JPL
306474	1999 RR_{210}	—	September 8, 1999	Socorro	LINEAR	·	1.9 km	MPC; JPL
306475	1999 RK_{252}	—	September 7, 1999	Socorro	LINEAR	·	1.0 km	MPC; JPL
306476	1999 RH_{258}	—	September 14, 1999	Socorro	LINEAR	·	2.2 km	MPC; JPL
306477	1999 SY_{2}	—	September 22, 1999	Socorro	LINEAR	·	1.6 km	MPC; JPL
306478	1999 SP_{3}	—	September 24, 1999	Socorro	LINEAR	·	4.3 km	MPC; JPL
306479 Tyburhoe	1999 SE_{16}	Tyburhoe	September 29, 1999	Catalina	CSS	·	1.5 km	MPC; JPL
306480	1999 TR_{14}	—	October 5, 1999	Ondřejov	P. Kušnirák	EOS	2.6 km	MPC; JPL
306481	1999 TL_{31}	—	October 4, 1999	Socorro	LINEAR	·	1.7 km	MPC; JPL
306482	1999 TO_{62}	—	October 7, 1999	Kitt Peak	Spacewatch	·	1.1 km	MPC; JPL
306483	1999 TR_{77}	—	October 10, 1999	Kitt Peak	Spacewatch	H	840 m	MPC; JPL
306484	1999 TP_{134}	—	October 6, 1999	Socorro	LINEAR	·	1.3 km	MPC; JPL
306485	1999 TQ_{151}	—	October 7, 1999	Socorro	LINEAR	·	1.6 km	MPC; JPL
306486	1999 TD_{164}	—	October 9, 1999	Socorro	LINEAR	·	3.6 km	MPC; JPL
306487	1999 TW_{178}	—	October 10, 1999	Socorro	LINEAR	NYS	1.9 km	MPC; JPL
306488	1999 TM_{194}	—	October 12, 1999	Socorro	LINEAR	·	1.9 km	MPC; JPL
306489	1999 TX_{196}	—	October 12, 1999	Socorro	LINEAR	·	1.9 km	MPC; JPL
306490	1999 TR_{232}	—	October 5, 1999	Catalina	CSS	·	1.9 km	MPC; JPL
306491	1999 TX_{233}	—	October 3, 1999	Kitt Peak	Spacewatch	·	1.7 km	MPC; JPL
306492	1999 TM_{244}	—	October 7, 1999	Catalina	CSS	·	6.0 km	MPC; JPL
306493	1999 TF_{280}	—	October 7, 1999	Socorro	LINEAR	·	1.4 km	MPC; JPL
306494	1999 TZ_{320}	—	October 10, 1999	Socorro	LINEAR	·	1.1 km	MPC; JPL
306495	1999 TH_{328}	—	October 3, 1999	Kitt Peak	Spacewatch	·	2.5 km	MPC; JPL
306496	1999 UJ_{12}	—	October 31, 1999	Kitt Peak	Spacewatch	·	1.8 km	MPC; JPL
306497	1999 UC_{17}	—	October 30, 1999	Catalina	CSS	T_{j} (2.98)	6.2 km	MPC; JPL
306498	1999 UF_{27}	—	October 30, 1999	Kitt Peak	Spacewatch	·	1.3 km	MPC; JPL
306499	1999 UY_{31}	—	October 31, 1999	Kitt Peak	Spacewatch	·	940 m	MPC; JPL
306500	1999 UR_{33}	—	October 31, 1999	Kitt Peak	Spacewatch	·	1.1 km	MPC; JPL

== 306501–306600 ==
back to top

Designation			Discovery			Properties		Ref
Permanent	Provisional	Named after	Date	Site	Discoverer(s)	Category	Diam.	Ref
306501	1999 VH_{1}	—	November 3, 1999	Baton Rouge	W. R. Cooney Jr., P. M. Motl	·	1.4 km	MPC; JPL
306502	1999 VY_{31}	—	November 3, 1999	Socorro	LINEAR	·	2.0 km	MPC; JPL
306503	1999 VB_{47}	—	November 4, 1999	Socorro	LINEAR	·	1.6 km	MPC; JPL
306504	1999 VU_{51}	—	November 3, 1999	Socorro	LINEAR	EUN	1.6 km	MPC; JPL
306505	1999 VH_{55}	—	November 4, 1999	Socorro	LINEAR	·	1.6 km	MPC; JPL
306506	1999 VG_{96}	—	November 9, 1999	Socorro	LINEAR	·	750 m	MPC; JPL
306507	1999 VM_{101}	—	November 9, 1999	Socorro	LINEAR	(5)	1.1 km	MPC; JPL
306508	1999 VC_{107}	—	November 9, 1999	Socorro	LINEAR	·	770 m	MPC; JPL
306509	1999 VB_{117}	—	November 5, 1999	Kitt Peak	Spacewatch	·	1.1 km	MPC; JPL
306510	1999 VW_{118}	—	November 3, 1999	Kitt Peak	Spacewatch	·	2.3 km	MPC; JPL
306511	1999 VR_{139}	—	November 10, 1999	Kitt Peak	Spacewatch	·	1.1 km	MPC; JPL
306512	1999 VL_{171}	—	November 14, 1999	Socorro	LINEAR	·	1.4 km	MPC; JPL
306513	1999 VM_{174}	—	November 13, 1999	Catalina	CSS	·	1.2 km	MPC; JPL
306514	1999 VX_{178}	—	November 6, 1999	Socorro	LINEAR	T_{j} (2.91)	3.5 km	MPC; JPL
306515	1999 VX_{185}	—	November 15, 1999	Socorro	LINEAR	·	3.0 km	MPC; JPL
306516	1999 VZ_{209}	—	November 12, 1999	Socorro	LINEAR	·	1.4 km	MPC; JPL
306517	1999 WY	—	November 17, 1999	Catalina	CSS	·	4.9 km	MPC; JPL
306518	1999 WF_{7}	—	November 28, 1999	Višnjan	K. Korlević	·	1.2 km	MPC; JPL
306519	1999 WZ_{17}	—	November 30, 1999	Kitt Peak	Spacewatch	·	3.9 km	MPC; JPL
306520	1999 WS_{19}	—	November 16, 1999	Kitt Peak	Spacewatch	MAS	820 m	MPC; JPL
306521	1999 WW_{24}	—	November 28, 1999	Kitt Peak	Spacewatch	·	2.5 km	MPC; JPL
306522	1999 XZ_{14}	—	December 6, 1999	Socorro	LINEAR	·	2.3 km	MPC; JPL
306523	1999 XR_{35}	—	December 7, 1999	Socorro	LINEAR	AMO	710 m	MPC; JPL
306524	1999 XO_{68}	—	December 7, 1999	Socorro	LINEAR	·	940 m	MPC; JPL
306525	1999 XW_{91}	—	December 7, 1999	Socorro	LINEAR	·	2.0 km	MPC; JPL
306526	1999 XD_{111}	—	December 5, 1999	Catalina	CSS	·	2.3 km	MPC; JPL
306527	1999 XF_{111}	—	December 7, 1999	Catalina	CSS	·	2.8 km	MPC; JPL
306528	1999 XH_{124}	—	December 7, 1999	Catalina	CSS	·	2.0 km	MPC; JPL
306529	1999 XM_{143}	—	December 12, 1999	Socorro	LINEAR	·	1.6 km	MPC; JPL
306530	1999 XM_{194}	—	December 12, 1999	Socorro	LINEAR	EUN	2.7 km	MPC; JPL
306531	1999 XM_{195}	—	December 12, 1999	Socorro	LINEAR	·	1.9 km	MPC; JPL
306532	1999 XA_{198}	—	December 12, 1999	Socorro	LINEAR	·	2.4 km	MPC; JPL
306533	1999 XF_{198}	—	December 12, 1999	Socorro	LINEAR	·	1.8 km	MPC; JPL
306534	1999 XS_{207}	—	December 12, 1999	Socorro	LINEAR	·	3.1 km	MPC; JPL
306535	1999 XG_{210}	—	December 13, 1999	Socorro	LINEAR	·	2.6 km	MPC; JPL
306536	1999 XU_{222}	—	December 15, 1999	Socorro	LINEAR	·	2.0 km	MPC; JPL
306537	1999 XN_{232}	—	December 7, 1999	Kitt Peak	Spacewatch	(5)	1.3 km	MPC; JPL
306538	1999 XY_{243}	—	December 5, 1999	Anderson Mesa	LONEOS	·	2.5 km	MPC; JPL
306539	1999 YV_{3}	—	December 19, 1999	Socorro	LINEAR	PHO	1.3 km	MPC; JPL
306540	1999 YB_{6}	—	December 30, 1999	Socorro	LINEAR	·	4.4 km	MPC; JPL
306541	1999 YJ_{7}	—	December 27, 1999	Kitt Peak	Spacewatch	·	2.0 km	MPC; JPL
306542	1999 YN_{8}	—	December 27, 1999	Kitt Peak	Spacewatch	(5)	1.9 km	MPC; JPL
306543	1999 YU_{8}	—	December 31, 1999	Olathe	Olathe	·	1.1 km	MPC; JPL
306544	1999 YO_{12}	—	December 27, 1999	Kitt Peak	Spacewatch	(1547)	2.7 km	MPC; JPL
306545	1999 YS_{24}	—	December 18, 1999	Kitt Peak	Spacewatch	·	1.4 km	MPC; JPL
306546	2000 AM_{5}	—	January 4, 2000	Višnjan	K. Korlević	·	2.1 km	MPC; JPL
306547	2000 AP_{8}	—	January 2, 2000	Socorro	LINEAR	·	2.8 km	MPC; JPL
306548	2000 AS_{35}	—	January 3, 2000	Socorro	LINEAR	·	1.8 km	MPC; JPL
306549	2000 AC_{53}	—	January 4, 2000	Socorro	LINEAR	·	1.5 km	MPC; JPL
306550	2000 AF_{89}	—	January 5, 2000	Socorro	LINEAR	·	1.4 km	MPC; JPL
306551	2000 AT_{94}	—	January 4, 2000	Socorro	LINEAR	·	1.6 km	MPC; JPL
306552	2000 AK_{154}	—	January 2, 2000	Socorro	LINEAR	·	1.8 km	MPC; JPL
306553	2000 AX_{158}	—	January 3, 2000	Socorro	LINEAR	·	2.2 km	MPC; JPL
306554	2000 AP_{194}	—	January 8, 2000	Socorro	LINEAR	·	5.7 km	MPC; JPL
306555	2000 AG_{219}	—	January 8, 2000	Kitt Peak	Spacewatch	·	1.5 km	MPC; JPL
306556	2000 AQ_{225}	—	January 12, 2000	Kitt Peak	Spacewatch	·	1.0 km	MPC; JPL
306557	2000 BW_{13}	—	January 29, 2000	Kitt Peak	Spacewatch	EUN	2.2 km	MPC; JPL
306558	2000 BL_{18}	—	January 30, 2000	Socorro	LINEAR	(5)	1.5 km	MPC; JPL
306559	2000 BP_{46}	—	January 28, 2000	Kitt Peak	Spacewatch	·	1.2 km	MPC; JPL
306560	2000 CH_{9}	—	February 2, 2000	Socorro	LINEAR	·	1.5 km	MPC; JPL
306561	2000 CT_{68}	—	February 1, 2000	Kitt Peak	Spacewatch	·	1.8 km	MPC; JPL
306562	2000 CM_{74}	—	February 8, 2000	Kitt Peak	Spacewatch	·	1.2 km	MPC; JPL
306563	2000 CM_{86}	—	February 4, 2000	Socorro	LINEAR	·	1.6 km	MPC; JPL
306564	2000 CC_{118}	—	February 3, 2000	Socorro	LINEAR	·	1.4 km	MPC; JPL
306565	2000 CO_{120}	—	February 3, 2000	Socorro	LINEAR	(5)	1.6 km	MPC; JPL
306566	2000 CZ_{126}	—	February 1, 2000	Kitt Peak	Spacewatch	·	1.3 km	MPC; JPL
306567	2000 CJ_{127}	—	February 3, 2000	Socorro	LINEAR	(5)	1.6 km	MPC; JPL
306568	2000 CU_{134}	—	February 4, 2000	Kitt Peak	Spacewatch	·	1.2 km	MPC; JPL
306569	2000 CA_{138}	—	February 4, 2000	Kitt Peak	Spacewatch	·	1.3 km	MPC; JPL
306570	2000 CR_{142}	—	February 4, 2000	Kitt Peak	Spacewatch	·	1.3 km	MPC; JPL
306571	2000 DT_{2}	—	February 27, 2000	Kitt Peak	Spacewatch	·	1.4 km	MPC; JPL
306572	2000 DL_{5}	—	February 28, 2000	Socorro	LINEAR	·	2.1 km	MPC; JPL
306573	2000 DL_{47}	—	February 29, 2000	Socorro	LINEAR	·	1.2 km	MPC; JPL
306574	2000 DG_{69}	—	February 29, 2000	Socorro	LINEAR	·	1.0 km	MPC; JPL
306575	2000 DT_{104}	—	February 29, 2000	Socorro	LINEAR	·	1.3 km	MPC; JPL
306576	2000 DQ_{117}	—	February 25, 2000	Kitt Peak	Spacewatch	·	1.2 km	MPC; JPL
306577	2000 EO_{13}	—	March 5, 2000	Socorro	LINEAR	·	1.9 km	MPC; JPL
306578	2000 EC_{76}	—	March 5, 2000	Socorro	LINEAR	·	2.0 km	MPC; JPL
306579	2000 ET_{108}	—	March 8, 2000	Socorro	LINEAR	BAR	1.5 km	MPC; JPL
306580	2000 EC_{134}	—	March 11, 2000	Anderson Mesa	LONEOS	·	2.5 km	MPC; JPL
306581	2000 ED_{204}	—	March 6, 2000	Cerro Tololo	Deep Lens Survey	·	1.9 km	MPC; JPL
306582	2000 FW	—	March 26, 2000	Prescott	P. G. Comba	·	940 m	MPC; JPL
306583	2000 FC_{4}	—	March 25, 2000	Kitt Peak	Spacewatch	·	1.5 km	MPC; JPL
306584	2000 FT_{7}	—	March 29, 2000	Socorro	LINEAR	·	2.5 km	MPC; JPL
306585	2000 FH_{9}	—	March 30, 2000	Kitt Peak	Spacewatch	·	1.8 km	MPC; JPL
306586	2000 FG_{22}	—	March 29, 2000	Socorro	LINEAR	·	1.7 km	MPC; JPL
306587	2000 FL_{24}	—	March 29, 2000	Socorro	LINEAR	·	5.1 km	MPC; JPL
306588	2000 FE_{54}	—	March 30, 2000	Kitt Peak	Spacewatch	·	2.0 km	MPC; JPL
306589	2000 FS_{64}	—	March 30, 2000	Socorro	LINEAR	·	2.2 km	MPC; JPL
306590	2000 GL_{3}	—	April 5, 2000	Socorro	LINEAR	·	2.4 km	MPC; JPL
306591	2000 GB_{28}	—	April 5, 2000	Socorro	LINEAR	·	770 m	MPC; JPL
306592	2000 GB_{44}	—	April 5, 2000	Socorro	LINEAR	·	1.4 km	MPC; JPL
306593	2000 GQ_{116}	—	April 2, 2000	Kitt Peak	Spacewatch	·	1.7 km	MPC; JPL
306594	2000 GJ_{120}	—	April 5, 2000	Kitt Peak	Spacewatch	NAE	3.6 km	MPC; JPL
306595	2000 GG_{147}	—	April 10, 2000	Anderson Mesa	LONEOS	AMO	640 m	MPC; JPL
306596	2000 GU_{160}	—	April 7, 2000	Anderson Mesa	LONEOS	·	2.4 km	MPC; JPL
306597	2000 GE_{167}	—	April 4, 2000	Anderson Mesa	LONEOS	·	3.8 km	MPC; JPL
306598	2000 GE_{176}	—	April 2, 2000	Kitt Peak	Spacewatch	EUN	2.0 km	MPC; JPL
306599	2000 HZ_{24}	—	April 24, 2000	Anderson Mesa	LONEOS	·	1.8 km	MPC; JPL
306600	2000 HO_{27}	—	April 28, 2000	Socorro	LINEAR	·	3.2 km	MPC; JPL

== 306601–306700 ==
back to top

Designation			Discovery			Properties		Ref
Permanent	Provisional	Named after	Date	Site	Discoverer(s)	Category	Diam.	Ref
306601	2000 HY_{34}	—	April 27, 2000	Socorro	LINEAR	H	710 m	MPC; JPL
306602	2000 HY_{96}	—	April 27, 2000	Anderson Mesa	LONEOS	·	1.6 km	MPC; JPL
306603	2000 JG_{2}	—	May 3, 2000	Socorro	LINEAR	·	4.0 km	MPC; JPL
306604	2000 KM_{70}	—	May 28, 2000	Socorro	LINEAR	·	2.2 km	MPC; JPL
306605	2000 LV_{25}	—	June 11, 2000	Socorro	LINEAR	·	4.4 km	MPC; JPL
306606	2000 LU_{36}	—	June 6, 2000	Anderson Mesa	LONEOS	·	5.2 km	MPC; JPL
306607	2000 OD_{2}	—	July 27, 2000	Prescott	P. G. Comba	·	1.3 km	MPC; JPL
306608	2000 OZ_{15}	—	July 23, 2000	Socorro	LINEAR	·	2.5 km	MPC; JPL
306609	2000 OG_{22}	—	July 30, 2000	Socorro	LINEAR	PHO	1.3 km	MPC; JPL
306610	2000 OG_{36}	—	July 24, 2000	Socorro	LINEAR	·	1.4 km	MPC; JPL
306611	2000 PA_{9}	—	August 4, 2000	Siding Spring	R. H. McNaught	T_{j} (2.99)	7.3 km	MPC; JPL
306612	2000 PU_{27}	—	August 9, 2000	Socorro	LINEAR	·	7.4 km	MPC; JPL
306613	2000 QX_{1}	—	August 22, 2000	Socorro	LINEAR	·	5.7 km	MPC; JPL
306614	2000 QL_{2}	—	August 24, 2000	Socorro	LINEAR	·	2.4 km	MPC; JPL
306615	2000 QK_{14}	—	August 24, 2000	Socorro	LINEAR	·	3.0 km	MPC; JPL
306616	2000 QR_{14}	—	August 24, 2000	Socorro	LINEAR	NYS	1.3 km	MPC; JPL
306617	2000 QP_{18}	—	August 24, 2000	Socorro	LINEAR	·	2.3 km	MPC; JPL
306618	2000 QY_{25}	—	August 26, 2000	Socorro	LINEAR	BAR	1.9 km	MPC; JPL
306619	2000 QE_{34}	—	August 26, 2000	Socorro	LINEAR	PHO	1.0 km	MPC; JPL
306620	2000 QG_{46}	—	August 24, 2000	Socorro	LINEAR	·	1.1 km	MPC; JPL
306621	2000 QH_{56}	—	August 26, 2000	Socorro	LINEAR	NYS	1.3 km	MPC; JPL
306622	2000 QU_{58}	—	August 26, 2000	Socorro	LINEAR	·	1.8 km	MPC; JPL
306623	2000 QD_{61}	—	August 26, 2000	Socorro	LINEAR	·	2.6 km	MPC; JPL
306624	2000 QA_{62}	—	August 28, 2000	Socorro	LINEAR	JUN	2.3 km	MPC; JPL
306625	2000 QB_{65}	—	August 28, 2000	Socorro	LINEAR	·	2.3 km	MPC; JPL
306626	2000 QD_{77}	—	August 24, 2000	Socorro	LINEAR	NYS	1.1 km	MPC; JPL
306627	2000 QA_{89}	—	August 25, 2000	Socorro	LINEAR	·	1.2 km	MPC; JPL
306628	2000 QA_{154}	—	August 31, 2000	Socorro	LINEAR	·	1.3 km	MPC; JPL
306629	2000 QA_{171}	—	August 31, 2000	Socorro	LINEAR	·	1.1 km	MPC; JPL
306630	2000 QF_{178}	—	August 31, 2000	Socorro	LINEAR	·	3.6 km	MPC; JPL
306631	2000 QO_{216}	—	August 31, 2000	Socorro	LINEAR	·	940 m	MPC; JPL
306632	2000 QW_{226}	—	August 31, 2000	Socorro	LINEAR	·	1.5 km	MPC; JPL
306633	2000 RT_{107}	—	September 10, 2000	Anderson Mesa	LONEOS	·	1.4 km	MPC; JPL
306634	2000 SO_{15}	—	September 23, 2000	Socorro	LINEAR	·	3.0 km	MPC; JPL
306635	2000 SP_{16}	—	September 23, 2000	Socorro	LINEAR	·	2.4 km	MPC; JPL
306636	2000 SS_{17}	—	September 23, 2000	Socorro	LINEAR	·	1.3 km	MPC; JPL
306637	2000 SJ_{21}	—	September 24, 2000	Socorro	LINEAR	H	780 m	MPC; JPL
306638	2000 SF_{30}	—	September 24, 2000	Socorro	LINEAR	·	1.4 km	MPC; JPL
306639	2000 SU_{30}	—	September 24, 2000	Socorro	LINEAR	V	840 m	MPC; JPL
306640	2000 SJ_{31}	—	September 24, 2000	Socorro	LINEAR	·	1.1 km	MPC; JPL
306641	2000 SS_{41}	—	September 24, 2000	Socorro	LINEAR	·	1.4 km	MPC; JPL
306642	2000 SP_{42}	—	September 25, 2000	Anderson Mesa	LONEOS	·	2.0 km	MPC; JPL
306643	2000 SU_{48}	—	September 23, 2000	Socorro	LINEAR	·	1.4 km	MPC; JPL
306644	2000 SM_{56}	—	September 24, 2000	Socorro	LINEAR	·	2.9 km	MPC; JPL
306645	2000 SO_{64}	—	September 24, 2000	Socorro	LINEAR	·	1.3 km	MPC; JPL
306646	2000 SC_{65}	—	September 24, 2000	Socorro	LINEAR	·	1.9 km	MPC; JPL
306647	2000 SO_{93}	—	September 23, 2000	Socorro	LINEAR	·	980 m	MPC; JPL
306648	2000 SH_{99}	—	September 23, 2000	Socorro	LINEAR	BRA	2.1 km	MPC; JPL
306649	2000 SR_{116}	—	September 24, 2000	Socorro	LINEAR	·	2.3 km	MPC; JPL
306650	2000 SP_{135}	—	September 23, 2000	Socorro	LINEAR	MAR	1.5 km	MPC; JPL
306651	2000 SW_{136}	—	September 23, 2000	Socorro	LINEAR	·	1.6 km	MPC; JPL
306652	2000 SJ_{137}	—	September 23, 2000	Socorro	LINEAR	·	2.8 km	MPC; JPL
306653	2000 SU_{138}	—	September 23, 2000	Socorro	LINEAR	·	1.3 km	MPC; JPL
306654	2000 SL_{149}	—	September 24, 2000	Socorro	LINEAR	MAS	870 m	MPC; JPL
306655	2000 SS_{153}	—	September 24, 2000	Socorro	LINEAR	·	1.8 km	MPC; JPL
306656	2000 SL_{189}	—	September 22, 2000	Kitt Peak	Spacewatch	EUN	1.5 km	MPC; JPL
306657	2000 ST_{189}	—	September 22, 2000	Haleakala	NEAT	·	1.6 km	MPC; JPL
306658	2000 SE_{195}	—	September 24, 2000	Socorro	LINEAR	(18466)	2.6 km	MPC; JPL
306659	2000 ST_{216}	—	September 26, 2000	Socorro	LINEAR	·	2.3 km	MPC; JPL
306660	2000 SS_{224}	—	September 27, 2000	Socorro	LINEAR	EOS	2.3 km	MPC; JPL
306661	2000 SF_{229}	—	September 28, 2000	Socorro	LINEAR	·	1.1 km	MPC; JPL
306662	2000 SZ_{238}	—	September 26, 2000	Socorro	LINEAR	·	2.0 km	MPC; JPL
306663	2000 SM_{261}	—	September 24, 2000	Socorro	LINEAR	V	1.1 km	MPC; JPL
306664	2000 SP_{266}	—	September 26, 2000	Socorro	LINEAR	·	1.0 km	MPC; JPL
306665	2000 SO_{277}	—	September 30, 2000	Socorro	LINEAR	·	1.3 km	MPC; JPL
306666	2000 SW_{283}	—	September 23, 2000	Socorro	LINEAR	·	1.5 km	MPC; JPL
306667	2000 SL_{299}	—	September 28, 2000	Socorro	LINEAR	·	1.8 km	MPC; JPL
306668	2000 SW_{324}	—	September 28, 2000	Kitt Peak	Spacewatch	·	1.7 km	MPC; JPL
306669	2000 SQ_{336}	—	September 26, 2000	Haleakala	NEAT	·	4.5 km	MPC; JPL
306670	2000 SO_{360}	—	September 26, 2000	Anderson Mesa	LONEOS	·	1.7 km	MPC; JPL
306671	2000 TP_{5}	—	October 1, 2000	Socorro	LINEAR	EOS	2.2 km	MPC; JPL
306672	2000 TR_{7}	—	October 1, 2000	Socorro	LINEAR	·	1.7 km	MPC; JPL
306673	2000 TL_{14}	—	October 1, 2000	Socorro	LINEAR	·	2.5 km	MPC; JPL
306674	2000 TR_{18}	—	October 1, 2000	Socorro	LINEAR	·	1.8 km	MPC; JPL
306675	2000 TF_{33}	—	October 4, 2000	Socorro	LINEAR	·	5.1 km	MPC; JPL
306676	2000 TF_{37}	—	October 1, 2000	Socorro	LINEAR	·	1.4 km	MPC; JPL
306677	2000 TX_{62}	—	October 2, 2000	Socorro	LINEAR	·	2.1 km	MPC; JPL
306678	2000 UK	—	October 19, 2000	Socorro	LINEAR	·	2.2 km	MPC; JPL
306679	2000 UO_{11}	—	October 18, 2000	Socorro	LINEAR	·	1.8 km	MPC; JPL
306680	2000 UP_{11}	—	October 18, 2000	Socorro	LINEAR	PHO	1.6 km	MPC; JPL
306681	2000 US_{13}	—	October 28, 2000	Črni Vrh	Skvarč, J.	·	1.2 km	MPC; JPL
306682	2000 UN_{14}	—	October 25, 2000	Socorro	LINEAR	·	1.6 km	MPC; JPL
306683	2000 UT_{15}	—	October 27, 2000	Kitt Peak	Spacewatch	·	1.0 km	MPC; JPL
306684	2000 UC_{18}	—	October 24, 2000	Socorro	LINEAR	(5)	1.8 km	MPC; JPL
306685	2000 UM_{28}	—	October 25, 2000	Socorro	LINEAR	·	3.2 km	MPC; JPL
306686	2000 UX_{41}	—	October 24, 2000	Socorro	LINEAR	·	1.2 km	MPC; JPL
306687	2000 UE_{43}	—	October 24, 2000	Socorro	LINEAR	·	1.2 km	MPC; JPL
306688	2000 UO_{62}	—	October 25, 2000	Socorro	LINEAR	·	2.8 km	MPC; JPL
306689	2000 UK_{84}	—	October 31, 2000	Socorro	LINEAR	·	2.9 km	MPC; JPL
306690	2000 UU_{90}	—	October 24, 2000	Socorro	LINEAR	·	2.8 km	MPC; JPL
306691	2000 UO_{94}	—	October 25, 2000	Socorro	LINEAR	(5)	1.4 km	MPC; JPL
306692	2000 UN_{97}	—	October 25, 2000	Socorro	LINEAR	·	1.8 km	MPC; JPL
306693	2000 UU_{99}	—	October 25, 2000	Socorro	LINEAR	·	1.4 km	MPC; JPL
306694	2000 UR_{105}	—	October 29, 2000	Socorro	LINEAR	·	1.2 km	MPC; JPL
306695	2000 VL_{1}	—	November 1, 2000	Socorro	LINEAR	·	3.4 km	MPC; JPL
306696	2000 VX_{1}	—	November 1, 2000	Socorro	LINEAR	H	600 m	MPC; JPL
306697	2000 VY_{8}	—	November 1, 2000	Socorro	LINEAR	·	3.6 km	MPC; JPL
306698	2000 VE_{20}	—	November 1, 2000	Socorro	LINEAR	·	1.1 km	MPC; JPL
306699	2000 VG_{26}	—	November 1, 2000	Socorro	LINEAR	·	3.0 km	MPC; JPL
306700	2000 VB_{41}	—	November 1, 2000	Socorro	LINEAR	·	2.4 km	MPC; JPL

== 306701–306800 ==
back to top

Designation			Discovery			Properties		Ref
Permanent	Provisional	Named after	Date	Site	Discoverer(s)	Category	Diam.	Ref
306701	2000 VC_{43}	—	November 1, 2000	Socorro	LINEAR	·	1.4 km	MPC; JPL
306702	2000 VQ_{52}	—	November 3, 2000	Socorro	LINEAR	·	1.5 km	MPC; JPL
306703	2000 WT	—	November 16, 2000	Socorro	LINEAR	PHO	1.5 km	MPC; JPL
306704	2000 WZ_{2}	—	November 19, 2000	Socorro	LINEAR	H	820 m	MPC; JPL
306705	2000 WK_{3}	—	November 16, 2000	Socorro	LINEAR	PHO	1.7 km	MPC; JPL
306706	2000 WP_{10}	—	November 17, 2000	Kitt Peak	Spacewatch	NYS	1.4 km	MPC; JPL
306707	2000 WW_{11}	—	November 20, 2000	Kitt Peak	Spacewatch	NYS	1.0 km	MPC; JPL
306708	2000 WC_{13}	—	November 20, 2000	Socorro	LINEAR	H	940 m	MPC; JPL
306709	2000 WH_{14}	—	November 20, 2000	Socorro	LINEAR	·	2.0 km	MPC; JPL
306710	2000 WE_{21}	—	November 25, 2000	Bohyunsan	Jeon, Y.-B., Lee, B.-C.	·	1.2 km	MPC; JPL
306711	2000 WY_{27}	—	November 26, 2000	Kitt Peak	Spacewatch	·	2.3 km	MPC; JPL
306712	2000 WQ_{29}	—	November 21, 2000	Socorro	LINEAR	T_{j} (2.96)	4.5 km	MPC; JPL
306713	2000 WA_{35}	—	November 20, 2000	Socorro	LINEAR	T_{j} (2.99) · (895)	5.2 km	MPC; JPL
306714	2000 WM_{35}	—	November 20, 2000	Socorro	LINEAR	·	2.1 km	MPC; JPL
306715	2000 WY_{50}	—	November 21, 2000	Socorro	LINEAR	·	4.5 km	MPC; JPL
306716	2000 WT_{52}	—	November 27, 2000	Kitt Peak	Spacewatch	·	3.7 km	MPC; JPL
306717	2000 WB_{68}	—	November 24, 2000	Oaxaca	Roe, J. M.	·	1.6 km	MPC; JPL
306718	2000 WW_{71}	—	November 19, 2000	Socorro	LINEAR	·	1.5 km	MPC; JPL
306719	2000 WK_{74}	—	November 20, 2000	Socorro	LINEAR	V	990 m	MPC; JPL
306720	2000 WX_{86}	—	November 20, 2000	Socorro	LINEAR	·	1.8 km	MPC; JPL
306721	2000 WA_{94}	—	November 21, 2000	Socorro	LINEAR	MAR	1.6 km	MPC; JPL
306722	2000 WF_{107}	—	November 29, 2000	Anderson Mesa	LONEOS	·	2.1 km	MPC; JPL
306723	2000 WS_{107}	—	November 20, 2000	Socorro	LINEAR	·	1.5 km	MPC; JPL
306724	2000 WR_{122}	—	November 29, 2000	Socorro	LINEAR	ERI	2.1 km	MPC; JPL
306725	2000 WH_{124}	—	November 19, 2000	Socorro	LINEAR	H	740 m	MPC; JPL
306726	2000 WK_{125}	—	November 29, 2000	Socorro	LINEAR	·	3.5 km	MPC; JPL
306727	2000 WU_{148}	—	November 28, 2000	Haleakala	NEAT	·	3.7 km	MPC; JPL
306728	2000 WD_{151}	—	November 20, 2000	Socorro	LINEAR	H	880 m	MPC; JPL
306729	2000 WX_{153}	—	November 30, 2000	Socorro	LINEAR	·	4.0 km	MPC; JPL
306730	2000 WX_{159}	—	November 20, 2000	Anderson Mesa	LONEOS	V	910 m	MPC; JPL
306731	2000 WG_{164}	—	November 21, 2000	Socorro	LINEAR	H	790 m	MPC; JPL
306732	2000 WB_{166}	—	November 24, 2000	Anderson Mesa	LONEOS	EOS	2.6 km	MPC; JPL
306733	2000 WH_{167}	—	November 24, 2000	Anderson Mesa	LONEOS	(5)	1.3 km	MPC; JPL
306734	2000 WX_{173}	—	November 26, 2000	Socorro	LINEAR	·	1.7 km	MPC; JPL
306735	2000 WY_{185}	—	November 28, 2000	Socorro	LINEAR	·	2.1 km	MPC; JPL
306736	2000 WP_{186}	—	November 27, 2000	Socorro	LINEAR	·	5.1 km	MPC; JPL
306737	2000 XT_{2}	—	December 1, 2000	Socorro	LINEAR	·	3.3 km	MPC; JPL
306738	2000 XE_{3}	—	December 1, 2000	Socorro	LINEAR	·	2.0 km	MPC; JPL
306739	2000 XU_{16}	—	December 1, 2000	Socorro	LINEAR	TIR	6.6 km	MPC; JPL
306740	2000 XY_{27}	—	December 4, 2000	Socorro	LINEAR	·	3.2 km	MPC; JPL
306741	2000 XV_{28}	—	December 4, 2000	Socorro	LINEAR	·	1.8 km	MPC; JPL
306742	2000 XV_{32}	—	December 4, 2000	Socorro	LINEAR	·	4.3 km	MPC; JPL
306743	2000 XU_{36}	—	December 5, 2000	Socorro	LINEAR	·	4.5 km	MPC; JPL
306744	2000 XR_{43}	—	December 5, 2000	Socorro	LINEAR	EUN	1.9 km	MPC; JPL
306745	2000 XY_{46}	—	December 7, 2000	Socorro	LINEAR	·	5.3 km	MPC; JPL
306746	2000 XM_{47}	—	December 4, 2000	Socorro	LINEAR	·	1.5 km	MPC; JPL
306747	2000 XW_{47}	—	December 4, 2000	Socorro	LINEAR	·	2.9 km	MPC; JPL
306748	2000 XU_{50}	—	December 6, 2000	Socorro	LINEAR	·	2.8 km	MPC; JPL
306749	2000 YS_{2}	—	December 19, 2000	Socorro	LINEAR	·	1.3 km	MPC; JPL
306750	2000 YB_{3}	—	December 18, 2000	Kitt Peak	Spacewatch	NYS	1.5 km	MPC; JPL
306751	2000 YH_{9}	—	December 21, 2000	Kitt Peak	Spacewatch	·	1.6 km	MPC; JPL
306752	2000 YN_{12}	—	December 22, 2000	Ondřejov	P. Kušnirák, P. Pravec	·	2.0 km	MPC; JPL
306753	2000 YM_{25}	—	December 29, 2000	Kitt Peak	Spacewatch	L4 · ERY	10 km	MPC; JPL
306754	2000 YS_{35}	—	December 30, 2000	Socorro	LINEAR	·	2.4 km	MPC; JPL
306755	2000 YC_{56}	—	December 30, 2000	Socorro	LINEAR	·	2.3 km	MPC; JPL
306756	2000 YR_{72}	—	December 30, 2000	Socorro	LINEAR	·	1.3 km	MPC; JPL
306757	2000 YA_{81}	—	December 30, 2000	Socorro	LINEAR	PHO	4.1 km	MPC; JPL
306758	2000 YM_{81}	—	December 30, 2000	Socorro	LINEAR	·	2.0 km	MPC; JPL
306759	2000 YX_{97}	—	December 30, 2000	Socorro	LINEAR	·	1.8 km	MPC; JPL
306760	2000 YM_{109}	—	December 30, 2000	Socorro	LINEAR	·	1.9 km	MPC; JPL
306761	2000 YR_{125}	—	December 29, 2000	Anderson Mesa	LONEOS	·	5.5 km	MPC; JPL
306762	2001 AE_{5}	—	January 2, 2001	Socorro	LINEAR	·	2.4 km	MPC; JPL
306763	2001 AS_{16}	—	January 2, 2001	Socorro	LINEAR	·	2.5 km	MPC; JPL
306764	2001 AV_{22}	—	January 3, 2001	Socorro	LINEAR	·	1.8 km	MPC; JPL
306765	2001 AL_{23}	—	January 3, 2001	Socorro	LINEAR	·	3.2 km	MPC; JPL
306766	2001 AW_{25}	—	January 4, 2001	Fair Oaks Ranch	J. V. McClusky	T_{j} (2.99)	5.3 km	MPC; JPL
306767	2001 AE_{46}	—	January 15, 2001	Socorro	LINEAR	H	840 m	MPC; JPL
306768	2001 AX_{51}	—	January 15, 2001	Kvistaberg	Uppsala-DLR Asteroid Survey	·	2.8 km	MPC; JPL
306769	2001 BX_{2}	—	January 18, 2001	Socorro	LINEAR	·	1.6 km	MPC; JPL
306770	2001 BU_{4}	—	January 18, 2001	Socorro	LINEAR	·	1.6 km	MPC; JPL
306771	2001 BS_{27}	—	January 20, 2001	Socorro	LINEAR	TIR	4.8 km	MPC; JPL
306772	2001 CY_{1}	—	February 1, 2001	Socorro	LINEAR	·	2.5 km	MPC; JPL
306773	2001 CJ_{44}	—	February 15, 2001	Socorro	LINEAR	·	5.7 km	MPC; JPL
306774	2001 DP_{24}	—	February 17, 2001	Socorro	LINEAR	·	2.7 km	MPC; JPL
306775	2001 DP_{72}	—	February 19, 2001	Socorro	LINEAR	MAS	910 m	MPC; JPL
306776	2001 DD_{77}	—	February 20, 2001	Socorro	LINEAR	·	5.0 km	MPC; JPL
306777	2001 DU_{90}	—	February 21, 2001	Anderson Mesa	LONEOS	·	1.5 km	MPC; JPL
306778	2001 DF_{92}	—	February 20, 2001	Kitt Peak	Spacewatch	·	2.7 km	MPC; JPL
306779	2001 FR_{28}	—	March 19, 2001	Socorro	LINEAR	·	1.9 km	MPC; JPL
306780	2001 FU_{77}	—	March 19, 2001	Socorro	LINEAR	·	1.8 km	MPC; JPL
306781	2001 FQ_{81}	—	March 23, 2001	Socorro	LINEAR	EUN	3.2 km	MPC; JPL
306782	2001 FR_{92}	—	March 16, 2001	Socorro	LINEAR	·	3.6 km	MPC; JPL
306783	2001 FK_{93}	—	March 16, 2001	Socorro	LINEAR	·	3.0 km	MPC; JPL
306784	2001 FD_{102}	—	March 17, 2001	Socorro	LINEAR	·	1.8 km	MPC; JPL
306785	2001 FH_{222}	—	March 22, 2001	Kitt Peak	SKADS	·	1.1 km	MPC; JPL
306786	2001 GL_{3}	—	April 14, 2001	Socorro	LINEAR	PHO	3.0 km	MPC; JPL
306787	2001 HS_{8}	—	April 22, 2001	Socorro	LINEAR	·	3.0 km	MPC; JPL
306788	2001 HV_{24}	—	April 27, 2001	Kitt Peak	Spacewatch	·	1.5 km	MPC; JPL
306789	2001 JJ_{8}	—	May 15, 2001	Anderson Mesa	LONEOS	·	2.4 km	MPC; JPL
306790	2001 KB_{1}	—	May 17, 2001	Socorro	LINEAR	·	3.0 km	MPC; JPL
306791	2001 KJ_{3}	—	May 17, 2001	Socorro	LINEAR	·	2.0 km	MPC; JPL
306792	2001 KQ_{77}	—	May 23, 2001	Cerro Tololo	M. W. Buie	plutino	186 km	MPC; JPL
306793	2001 MH_{17}	—	June 27, 2001	Palomar	NEAT	·	3.3 km	MPC; JPL
306794	2001 MO_{21}	—	June 27, 2001	Palomar	NEAT	·	2.7 km	MPC; JPL
306795	2001 OQ_{50}	—	July 26, 2001	Palomar	NEAT	·	3.5 km	MPC; JPL
306796	2001 OX_{74}	—	July 29, 2001	Socorro	LINEAR	·	790 m	MPC; JPL
306797	2001 ON_{93}	—	July 25, 2001	Haleakala	NEAT	·	2.1 km	MPC; JPL
306798	2001 OW_{94}	—	July 20, 2001	Mauna Kea	D. J. Tholen	·	1.9 km	MPC; JPL
306799	2001 PK_{31}	—	August 10, 2001	Palomar	NEAT	·	2.6 km	MPC; JPL
306800	2001 PG_{44}	—	August 15, 2001	Haleakala	NEAT	·	1.4 km	MPC; JPL

== 306801–306900 ==
back to top

Designation			Discovery			Properties		Ref
Permanent	Provisional	Named after	Date	Site	Discoverer(s)	Category	Diam.	Ref
306801	2001 QL_{20}	—	August 16, 2001	Socorro	LINEAR	·	4.1 km	MPC; JPL
306802	2001 QC_{50}	—	August 16, 2001	Socorro	LINEAR	T_{j} (2.95) · 3:2	8.4 km	MPC; JPL
306803	2001 QQ_{61}	—	August 16, 2001	Socorro	LINEAR	·	1.3 km	MPC; JPL
306804	2001 QT_{62}	—	August 16, 2001	Socorro	LINEAR	NYS	1.6 km	MPC; JPL
306805	2001 QO_{65}	—	August 17, 2001	Socorro	LINEAR	·	1.9 km	MPC; JPL
306806	2001 QQ_{86}	—	August 16, 2001	Palomar	NEAT	·	2.4 km	MPC; JPL
306807	2001 QR_{101}	—	August 18, 2001	Socorro	LINEAR	·	2.0 km	MPC; JPL
306808	2001 QL_{105}	—	August 23, 2001	Socorro	LINEAR	·	2.0 km	MPC; JPL
306809	2001 QG_{128}	—	August 20, 2001	Socorro	LINEAR	·	1.9 km	MPC; JPL
306810	2001 QE_{133}	—	August 21, 2001	Socorro	LINEAR	·	4.9 km	MPC; JPL
306811	2001 QV_{147}	—	August 20, 2001	Palomar	NEAT	·	4.2 km	MPC; JPL
306812	2001 QA_{151}	—	August 23, 2001	Socorro	LINEAR	GAL	2.2 km	MPC; JPL
306813	2001 QZ_{161}	—	August 23, 2001	Anderson Mesa	LONEOS	V	830 m	MPC; JPL
306814	2001 QS_{175}	—	August 23, 2001	Kitt Peak	Spacewatch	AGN	1.2 km	MPC; JPL
306815	2001 QG_{193}	—	August 22, 2001	Socorro	LINEAR	·	1.9 km	MPC; JPL
306816	2001 QK_{194}	—	August 22, 2001	Socorro	LINEAR	PHO	1.3 km	MPC; JPL
306817	2001 QQ_{219}	—	August 23, 2001	Socorro	LINEAR	·	2.0 km	MPC; JPL
306818	2001 QV_{221}	—	August 24, 2001	Anderson Mesa	LONEOS	·	2.4 km	MPC; JPL
306819	2001 QM_{237}	—	August 24, 2001	Socorro	LINEAR	·	750 m	MPC; JPL
306820	2001 QL_{257}	—	August 25, 2001	Socorro	LINEAR	·	1.1 km	MPC; JPL
306821	2001 QU_{266}	—	August 20, 2001	Socorro	LINEAR	·	2.2 km	MPC; JPL
306822	2001 QT_{294}	—	August 24, 2001	Anderson Mesa	LONEOS	·	2.2 km	MPC; JPL
306823	2001 QQ_{330}	—	August 27, 2001	Anderson Mesa	LONEOS	·	640 m	MPC; JPL
306824	2001 RB_{3}	—	September 8, 2001	Anderson Mesa	LONEOS	·	2.2 km	MPC; JPL
306825	2001 RX_{13}	—	September 10, 2001	Socorro	LINEAR	·	750 m	MPC; JPL
306826	2001 RZ_{17}	—	September 11, 2001	Socorro	LINEAR	·	2.3 km	MPC; JPL
306827	2001 RL_{22}	—	September 7, 2001	Socorro	LINEAR	·	4.3 km	MPC; JPL
306828	2001 RV_{31}	—	September 8, 2001	Socorro	LINEAR	·	1.6 km	MPC; JPL
306829	2001 RM_{39}	—	September 10, 2001	Socorro	LINEAR	·	3.0 km	MPC; JPL
306830	2001 RV_{50}	—	September 11, 2001	Socorro	LINEAR	·	1.0 km	MPC; JPL
306831	2001 RH_{65}	—	September 10, 2001	Socorro	LINEAR	·	2.6 km	MPC; JPL
306832	2001 RA_{133}	—	September 12, 2001	Socorro	LINEAR	·	680 m	MPC; JPL
306833	2001 RJ_{143}	—	September 15, 2001	Palomar	NEAT	·	1.2 km	MPC; JPL
306834	2001 RZ_{150}	—	September 11, 2001	Anderson Mesa	LONEOS	·	840 m	MPC; JPL
306835	2001 SE_{2}	—	September 17, 2001	Desert Eagle	W. K. Y. Yeung	·	1.5 km	MPC; JPL
306836	2001 SB_{16}	—	September 16, 2001	Socorro	LINEAR	·	2.0 km	MPC; JPL
306837	2001 SL_{28}	—	September 16, 2001	Socorro	LINEAR	·	2.7 km	MPC; JPL
306838	2001 SU_{28}	—	September 16, 2001	Socorro	LINEAR	·	2.1 km	MPC; JPL
306839	2001 SG_{35}	—	September 16, 2001	Socorro	LINEAR	·	760 m	MPC; JPL
306840	2001 SD_{46}	—	September 16, 2001	Socorro	LINEAR	·	840 m	MPC; JPL
306841	2001 SL_{47}	—	September 16, 2001	Socorro	LINEAR	·	1.9 km	MPC; JPL
306842	2001 SB_{49}	—	September 16, 2001	Socorro	LINEAR	·	1.0 km	MPC; JPL
306843	2001 SB_{60}	—	September 17, 2001	Socorro	LINEAR	·	1.0 km	MPC; JPL
306844	2001 SO_{69}	—	September 17, 2001	Socorro	LINEAR	·	2.0 km	MPC; JPL
306845	2001 SB_{74}	—	September 19, 2001	Anderson Mesa	LONEOS	·	1.7 km	MPC; JPL
306846	2001 ST_{78}	—	September 19, 2001	Socorro	LINEAR	·	980 m	MPC; JPL
306847	2001 SH_{84}	—	September 20, 2001	Socorro	LINEAR	·	3.1 km	MPC; JPL
306848	2001 SU_{93}	—	September 20, 2001	Socorro	LINEAR	·	780 m	MPC; JPL
306849	2001 SO_{98}	—	September 20, 2001	Socorro	LINEAR	·	2.7 km	MPC; JPL
306850	2001 SS_{119}	—	September 16, 2001	Socorro	LINEAR	·	2.2 km	MPC; JPL
306851	2001 SC_{120}	—	September 16, 2001	Socorro	LINEAR	·	1.6 km	MPC; JPL
306852	2001 SH_{134}	—	September 16, 2001	Socorro	LINEAR	·	1.1 km	MPC; JPL
306853	2001 SB_{142}	—	September 16, 2001	Socorro	LINEAR	·	950 m	MPC; JPL
306854	2001 SQ_{143}	—	September 16, 2001	Socorro	LINEAR	·	3.7 km	MPC; JPL
306855	2001 SQ_{147}	—	September 17, 2001	Socorro	LINEAR	·	930 m	MPC; JPL
306856	2001 SA_{163}	—	September 17, 2001	Socorro	LINEAR	EUN	1.9 km	MPC; JPL
306857	2001 SR_{169}	—	September 17, 2001	Palomar	NEAT	·	2.6 km	MPC; JPL
306858	2001 SA_{185}	—	September 19, 2001	Socorro	LINEAR	·	2.3 km	MPC; JPL
306859	2001 SG_{200}	—	September 19, 2001	Socorro	LINEAR	·	2.3 km	MPC; JPL
306860	2001 SP_{215}	—	September 19, 2001	Socorro	LINEAR	·	1.5 km	MPC; JPL
306861	2001 SL_{216}	—	September 19, 2001	Socorro	LINEAR	·	2.2 km	MPC; JPL
306862	2001 SR_{223}	—	September 19, 2001	Socorro	LINEAR	·	2.5 km	MPC; JPL
306863	2001 SB_{241}	—	September 19, 2001	Socorro	LINEAR	·	1.0 km	MPC; JPL
306864	2001 SR_{249}	—	September 19, 2001	Socorro	LINEAR	·	3.8 km	MPC; JPL
306865	2001 SS_{263}	—	September 18, 2001	Anderson Mesa	LONEOS	·	3.3 km	MPC; JPL
306866	2001 SN_{268}	—	September 22, 2001	Kitt Peak	Spacewatch	·	3.4 km	MPC; JPL
306867	2001 SC_{269}	—	September 19, 2001	Kitt Peak	Spacewatch	·	1.1 km	MPC; JPL
306868	2001 SM_{272}	—	September 21, 2001	Socorro	LINEAR	·	750 m	MPC; JPL
306869	2001 SH_{288}	—	September 27, 2001	Palomar	NEAT	·	740 m	MPC; JPL
306870	2001 SJ_{291}	—	September 21, 2001	Anderson Mesa	LONEOS	·	1.9 km	MPC; JPL
306871	2001 SG_{317}	—	September 25, 2001	Palomar	NEAT	·	1.9 km	MPC; JPL
306872	2001 SV_{321}	—	September 25, 2001	Socorro	LINEAR	·	1.5 km	MPC; JPL
306873	2001 SS_{327}	—	September 18, 2001	Anderson Mesa	LONEOS	·	2.3 km	MPC; JPL
306874	2001 SE_{335}	—	September 20, 2001	Socorro	LINEAR	·	1.9 km	MPC; JPL
306875	2001 SX_{338}	—	September 20, 2001	Kitt Peak	Spacewatch	AGN	1.4 km	MPC; JPL
306876	2001 TE	—	October 8, 2001	Palomar	NEAT	·	2.6 km	MPC; JPL
306877	2001 TT_{5}	—	October 10, 2001	Palomar	NEAT	·	1.6 km	MPC; JPL
306878	2001 TN_{14}	—	October 7, 2001	Palomar	NEAT	·	870 m	MPC; JPL
306879	2001 TY_{15}	—	October 11, 2001	Socorro	LINEAR	·	1.6 km	MPC; JPL
306880	2001 TL_{23}	—	October 14, 2001	Socorro	LINEAR	·	1.7 km	MPC; JPL
306881	2001 TY_{24}	—	October 14, 2001	Socorro	LINEAR	·	1.3 km	MPC; JPL
306882	2001 TB_{34}	—	October 14, 2001	Socorro	LINEAR	·	2.3 km	MPC; JPL
306883	2001 TK_{38}	—	October 14, 2001	Socorro	LINEAR	·	2.0 km	MPC; JPL
306884	2001 TZ_{49}	—	October 13, 2001	Socorro	LINEAR	·	3.6 km	MPC; JPL
306885	2001 TO_{50}	—	October 13, 2001	Socorro	LINEAR	·	1.4 km	MPC; JPL
306886	2001 TC_{63}	—	October 13, 2001	Socorro	LINEAR	·	690 m	MPC; JPL
306887	2001 TU_{63}	—	October 13, 2001	Socorro	LINEAR	·	1.7 km	MPC; JPL
306888	2001 TH_{92}	—	October 14, 2001	Socorro	LINEAR	(5)	1.2 km	MPC; JPL
306889	2001 TF_{97}	—	October 14, 2001	Socorro	LINEAR	·	2.0 km	MPC; JPL
306890	2001 TP_{97}	—	October 14, 2001	Socorro	LINEAR	·	3.5 km	MPC; JPL
306891	2001 TA_{98}	—	October 14, 2001	Socorro	LINEAR	·	1.3 km	MPC; JPL
306892	2001 TB_{104}	—	October 15, 2001	Desert Eagle	W. K. Y. Yeung	V	980 m	MPC; JPL
306893	2001 TB_{119}	—	October 15, 2001	Socorro	LINEAR	·	2.3 km	MPC; JPL
306894	2001 TW_{121}	—	October 15, 2001	Socorro	LINEAR	BRA	2.3 km	MPC; JPL
306895	2001 TT_{127}	—	October 15, 2001	Socorro	LINEAR	·	1.6 km	MPC; JPL
306896	2001 TC_{146}	—	October 10, 2001	Palomar	NEAT	·	1.9 km	MPC; JPL
306897	2001 TD_{152}	—	October 10, 2001	Palomar	NEAT	EOS	2.5 km	MPC; JPL
306898	2001 TR_{160}	—	October 15, 2001	Kitt Peak	Spacewatch	·	2.1 km	MPC; JPL
306899	2001 TJ_{161}	—	October 11, 2001	Palomar	NEAT	EOS	2.6 km	MPC; JPL
306900	2001 TG_{167}	—	October 15, 2001	Socorro	LINEAR	·	2.2 km	MPC; JPL

== 306901–307000 ==
back to top

Designation			Discovery			Properties		Ref
Permanent	Provisional	Named after	Date	Site	Discoverer(s)	Category	Diam.	Ref
306901	2001 TN_{167}	—	October 15, 2001	Socorro	LINEAR	·	2.1 km	MPC; JPL
306902	2001 TV_{171}	—	October 13, 2001	Anderson Mesa	LONEOS	·	1.4 km	MPC; JPL
306903	2001 TT_{172}	—	October 13, 2001	Socorro	LINEAR	NYS	1.6 km	MPC; JPL
306904	2001 TT_{174}	—	October 15, 2001	Socorro	LINEAR	·	3.9 km	MPC; JPL
306905	2001 TR_{176}	—	October 14, 2001	Socorro	LINEAR	·	1.2 km	MPC; JPL
306906	2001 TO_{180}	—	October 14, 2001	Socorro	LINEAR	·	940 m	MPC; JPL
306907	2001 TD_{181}	—	October 14, 2001	Socorro	LINEAR	·	4.2 km	MPC; JPL
306908	2001 TG_{181}	—	October 14, 2001	Socorro	LINEAR	·	4.1 km	MPC; JPL
306909	2001 TC_{198}	—	October 11, 2001	Kitt Peak	Spacewatch	·	1.3 km	MPC; JPL
306910	2001 TC_{200}	—	October 11, 2001	Socorro	LINEAR	·	750 m	MPC; JPL
306911	2001 TV_{208}	—	October 12, 2001	Anderson Mesa	LONEOS	MAR	1.2 km	MPC; JPL
306912	2001 TZ_{216}	—	October 13, 2001	Goodricke-Pigott	R. A. Tucker	·	2.9 km	MPC; JPL
306913	2001 TA_{217}	—	October 13, 2001	Palomar	NEAT	·	1.7 km	MPC; JPL
306914	2001 TR_{226}	—	October 14, 2001	Palomar	NEAT	EUN	1.6 km	MPC; JPL
306915	2001 TM_{231}	—	October 15, 2001	Palomar	NEAT	·	1.8 km	MPC; JPL
306916	2001 TN_{241}	—	October 10, 2001	Kitt Peak	Spacewatch	·	1.1 km	MPC; JPL
306917	2001 UW_{4}	—	October 20, 2001	Palomar	NEAT	·	470 m	MPC; JPL
306918	2001 UQ_{11}	—	October 23, 2001	Socorro	LINEAR	AMO +1km	1.2 km	MPC; JPL
306919	2001 UU_{17}	—	October 19, 2001	Palomar	NEAT	·	2.6 km	MPC; JPL
306920	2001 UV_{25}	—	October 18, 2001	Socorro	LINEAR	·	1.4 km	MPC; JPL
306921	2001 UE_{29}	—	October 16, 2001	Socorro	LINEAR	·	1.1 km	MPC; JPL
306922	2001 UL_{29}	—	October 16, 2001	Socorro	LINEAR	EUN	1.5 km	MPC; JPL
306923	2001 UX_{31}	—	October 16, 2001	Socorro	LINEAR	ADE	2.2 km	MPC; JPL
306924	2001 UW_{42}	—	October 17, 2001	Socorro	LINEAR	MAS	1.1 km	MPC; JPL
306925	2001 UK_{44}	—	October 17, 2001	Socorro	LINEAR	·	2.4 km	MPC; JPL
306926	2001 UB_{52}	—	October 17, 2001	Socorro	LINEAR	·	2.0 km	MPC; JPL
306927	2001 UR_{56}	—	October 17, 2001	Socorro	LINEAR	·	2.0 km	MPC; JPL
306928	2001 UC_{61}	—	October 17, 2001	Socorro	LINEAR	·	1.2 km	MPC; JPL
306929	2001 UG_{79}	—	October 20, 2001	Socorro	LINEAR	·	1.2 km	MPC; JPL
306930	2001 UA_{81}	—	October 20, 2001	Socorro	LINEAR	fast	2.2 km	MPC; JPL
306931	2001 UQ_{87}	—	October 21, 2001	Kitt Peak	Spacewatch	·	2.7 km	MPC; JPL
306932	2001 UM_{89}	—	October 22, 2001	Palomar	NEAT	·	4.3 km	MPC; JPL
306933	2001 UT_{90}	—	October 23, 2001	Kitt Peak	Spacewatch	·	1 km	MPC; JPL
306934	2001 UB_{95}	—	October 19, 2001	Palomar	NEAT	·	3.0 km	MPC; JPL
306935	2001 UK_{99}	—	October 17, 2001	Socorro	LINEAR	·	1.8 km	MPC; JPL
306936	2001 US_{100}	—	October 20, 2001	Socorro	LINEAR	EOS	2.7 km	MPC; JPL
306937	2001 UM_{103}	—	October 20, 2001	Socorro	LINEAR	·	970 m	MPC; JPL
306938	2001 UC_{108}	—	October 20, 2001	Socorro	LINEAR	EOS	2.3 km	MPC; JPL
306939	2001 UW_{108}	—	October 20, 2001	Socorro	LINEAR	·	1.7 km	MPC; JPL
306940	2001 UL_{110}	—	October 21, 2001	Socorro	LINEAR	·	660 m	MPC; JPL
306941	2001 UH_{111}	—	October 21, 2001	Socorro	LINEAR	·	1.2 km	MPC; JPL
306942	2001 UP_{130}	—	October 20, 2001	Socorro	LINEAR	·	910 m	MPC; JPL
306943	2001 UR_{131}	—	October 20, 2001	Socorro	LINEAR	·	2.1 km	MPC; JPL
306944	2001 UF_{135}	—	October 22, 2001	Socorro	LINEAR	·	1.5 km	MPC; JPL
306945	2001 UM_{135}	—	October 22, 2001	Socorro	LINEAR	·	1.4 km	MPC; JPL
306946	2001 UW_{135}	—	October 22, 2001	Socorro	LINEAR	MAR	1.3 km	MPC; JPL
306947	2001 UP_{139}	—	October 23, 2001	Socorro	LINEAR	·	1.2 km	MPC; JPL
306948	2001 UU_{143}	—	October 23, 2001	Socorro	LINEAR	HNS	1.4 km	MPC; JPL
306949	2001 UA_{154}	—	October 23, 2001	Socorro	LINEAR	·	2.3 km	MPC; JPL
306950	2001 UB_{167}	—	October 18, 2001	Socorro	LINEAR	·	1.1 km	MPC; JPL
306951	2001 UV_{170}	—	October 21, 2001	Socorro	LINEAR	·	1.3 km	MPC; JPL
306952	2001 UL_{176}	—	October 25, 2001	Kitt Peak	Spacewatch	·	1.3 km	MPC; JPL
306953	2001 UY_{178}	—	October 24, 2001	Palomar	NEAT	·	2.5 km	MPC; JPL
306954	2001 UN_{184}	—	October 16, 2001	Palomar	NEAT	·	1.6 km	MPC; JPL
306955	2001 UA_{188}	—	October 17, 2001	Socorro	LINEAR	·	1.3 km	MPC; JPL
306956	2001 UX_{191}	—	October 18, 2001	Socorro	LINEAR	·	1.7 km	MPC; JPL
306957	2001 UW_{209}	—	October 20, 2001	Palomar	NEAT	·	830 m	MPC; JPL
306958	2001 UB_{213}	—	October 22, 2001	Socorro	LINEAR	·	1.2 km	MPC; JPL
306959	2001 UE_{219}	—	October 19, 2001	Palomar	NEAT	·	1.2 km	MPC; JPL
306960	2001 UV_{221}	—	October 24, 2001	Socorro	LINEAR	·	1.3 km	MPC; JPL
306961	2001 UR_{222}	—	October 21, 2001	Kitt Peak	Spacewatch	·	1.2 km	MPC; JPL
306962	2001 UW_{226}	—	October 16, 2001	Palomar	NEAT	·	3.0 km	MPC; JPL
306963	2001 VC_{5}	—	November 11, 2001	Socorro	LINEAR	·	1.0 km	MPC; JPL
306964	2001 VN_{9}	—	November 9, 2001	Socorro	LINEAR	·	1.1 km	MPC; JPL
306965	2001 VZ_{19}	—	November 9, 2001	Socorro	LINEAR	·	1.5 km	MPC; JPL
306966	2001 VK_{21}	—	November 9, 2001	Socorro	LINEAR	·	1.4 km	MPC; JPL
306967	2001 VA_{24}	—	November 9, 2001	Socorro	LINEAR	ELF	7.2 km	MPC; JPL
306968	2001 VL_{40}	—	November 9, 2001	Socorro	LINEAR	(5)	1.4 km	MPC; JPL
306969	2001 VU_{58}	—	November 10, 2001	Socorro	LINEAR	·	1.7 km	MPC; JPL
306970	2001 VD_{62}	—	November 10, 2001	Socorro	LINEAR	EOS	3.0 km	MPC; JPL
306971	2001 VF_{62}	—	November 10, 2001	Socorro	LINEAR	·	1.6 km	MPC; JPL
306972	2001 VY_{62}	—	November 10, 2001	Socorro	LINEAR	·	2.3 km	MPC; JPL
306973	2001 VX_{64}	—	November 10, 2001	Socorro	LINEAR	·	1.5 km	MPC; JPL
306974	2001 VG_{74}	—	November 12, 2001	Socorro	LINEAR	·	2.9 km	MPC; JPL
306975	2001 VP_{76}	—	November 12, 2001	Socorro	LINEAR	H	850 m	MPC; JPL
306976	2001 VR_{78}	—	November 11, 2001	Socorro	LINEAR	·	4.4 km	MPC; JPL
306977	2001 VB_{82}	—	November 15, 2001	Ondřejov	P. Pravec, P. Kušnirák	·	3.6 km	MPC; JPL
306978	2001 VW_{84}	—	November 12, 2001	Socorro	LINEAR	·	2.2 km	MPC; JPL
306979	2001 VY_{84}	—	November 12, 2001	Socorro	LINEAR	·	3.0 km	MPC; JPL
306980	2001 VV_{101}	—	November 12, 2001	Socorro	LINEAR	·	850 m	MPC; JPL
306981	2001 VY_{105}	—	November 12, 2001	Socorro	LINEAR	·	2.1 km	MPC; JPL
306982	2001 VQ_{107}	—	November 12, 2001	Socorro	LINEAR	·	1.8 km	MPC; JPL
306983	2001 VD_{112}	—	November 12, 2001	Socorro	LINEAR	VER	3.9 km	MPC; JPL
306984	2001 VZ_{112}	—	November 12, 2001	Socorro	LINEAR	·	3.5 km	MPC; JPL
306985	2001 VD_{113}	—	November 12, 2001	Socorro	LINEAR	EUN	1.6 km	MPC; JPL
306986	2001 VN_{113}	—	November 12, 2001	Socorro	LINEAR	·	1.9 km	MPC; JPL
306987	2001 VS_{115}	—	November 12, 2001	Socorro	LINEAR	·	870 m	MPC; JPL
306988	2001 VY_{125}	—	November 14, 2001	Kitt Peak	Spacewatch	·	920 m	MPC; JPL
306989	2001 WP_{7}	—	November 17, 2001	Socorro	LINEAR	·	1.4 km	MPC; JPL
306990	2001 WJ_{17}	—	November 17, 2001	Socorro	LINEAR	·	1.1 km	MPC; JPL
306991	2001 WF_{18}	—	November 17, 2001	Socorro	LINEAR	EUN	1.3 km	MPC; JPL
306992	2001 WB_{19}	—	November 17, 2001	Socorro	LINEAR	·	1.5 km	MPC; JPL
306993	2001 WO_{27}	—	November 17, 2001	Socorro	LINEAR	·	1.7 km	MPC; JPL
306994	2001 WO_{31}	—	November 17, 2001	Socorro	LINEAR	·	3.0 km	MPC; JPL
306995	2001 WY_{46}	—	November 20, 2001	Socorro	LINEAR	·	1.1 km	MPC; JPL
306996	2001 WU_{51}	—	November 19, 2001	Socorro	LINEAR	·	640 m	MPC; JPL
306997	2001 WS_{56}	—	November 19, 2001	Socorro	LINEAR	(5)	1.3 km	MPC; JPL
306998	2001 WY_{58}	—	November 19, 2001	Socorro	LINEAR	·	1.3 km	MPC; JPL
306999	2001 WF_{77}	—	November 20, 2001	Socorro	LINEAR	·	2.6 km	MPC; JPL
307000	2001 WA_{86}	—	November 20, 2001	Socorro	LINEAR	·	700 m	MPC; JPL

back to top

== See also ==
- Meanings of minor-planet names: 306001–307000
