= Meanings of minor-planet names: 306001–307000 =

As minor planet discoveries are confirmed, they are given a permanent number by the IAU's Minor Planet Center (MPC), and the discoverers can then submit names for them, following the IAU's naming conventions. The list below concerns those minor planets in the specified number-range that have received names, and explains the meanings of those names.

Official naming citations of newly named small Solar System bodies are approved and published in a bulletin by IAU's Working Group for Small Bodies Nomenclature (WGSBN). Before May 2021, citations were published in MPC's Minor Planet Circulars for many decades. Recent citations can also be found on the JPL Small-Body Database (SBDB). Until his death in 2016, German astronomer Lutz D. Schmadel compiled these citations into the Dictionary of Minor Planet Names (DMP) and regularly updated the collection.

Based on Paul Herget's The Names of the Minor Planets, Schmadel also researched the unclear origin of numerous asteroids, most of which had been named prior to World War II. This article incorporates text from this source, which is in the public domain: SBDB New namings may only be added to this list below after official publication as the preannouncement of names is condemned. The WGSBN publishes a comprehensive guideline for the naming rules of non-cometary small Solar System bodies.

== 306001–306100 ==
Named minor planet	Provisional	This minor planet was named for...	Ref · Catalog
306001 Joanllaneras	2009 TD_{42}	Joan Llaneras Roselló (born 1969), Spanish cyclist who was a two-time Olympic champion and seven-time world champion.	JPL · 306001
306019 Duren	2010 DD_{27}	Riley Duren (born 1968) is an American systems engineer who studies climate change.	JPL · 306019
306020 Kormilov	2010 DC_{34}	Sergei I. Kormilov (1951–2020) was a Russian literary historian and theorist, a Doctor of Philology, a professor of Moscow University, and an author of educational books and about 800 scientific papers.	IAU · 306020

== 306101–306200 ==
back to top

Named minor planet	Provisional	This minor planet was named for...	Ref · Catalog
306128 Pipher	2010 JP_{109}	Judith Pipher (1940–2022) was a Canadian-American astrophysicist and professor at the University of Rochester.	JPL · 306128

== 306201–306300 ==
back to top

Named minor planet	Provisional	This minor planet was named for...	Ref · Catalog
306257 Janethunten	2011 RF_{3}	Janet Hunten, Canadian historian.	IAU · 306257

== 306301–306400 ==
back to top

Named minor planet	Provisional	This minor planet was named for...	Ref · Catalog
306367 Nut	5025 P-L	Nut, a goddess of the heavens in the old Egyptian religion. With Geb, the god of Earth, she gave birth to the god Osiris.	JPL · 306367
306386 Carlofavetti	1994 CF	Carlo Favetti (1819–1892) was an Italian politician, journalist, writer and poet who wrote in the Friulian language.	IAU · 306386

== 306401–306500 ==
back to top

Named minor planet	Provisional	This minor planet was named for...	Ref · Catalog
306479 Tyburhoe	1999 SE_{16}	Ty Burhoe (born 1964) is a tabla player, composer, producer, and teacher whose wide-ranging musical collaborations have opened new stylistic frontiers for the tabla. His generosity sharing his explorations of the instrument has inspired many people to learn the tabla as a path for self-discovery and collaborative creation.	JPL · 306479

== 306501–306600 ==
back to top

Named minor planet	Provisional	This minor planet was named for...	Ref · Catalog
There are no named minor planets in this number range

== 306601–306700 ==
back to top

Named minor planet	Provisional	This minor planet was named for...	Ref · Catalog
There are no named minor planets in this number range

== 306701–306800 ==
back to top

Named minor planet	Provisional	This minor planet was named for...	Ref · Catalog
There are no named minor planets in this number range

== 306801–306900 ==
back to top

Named minor planet	Provisional	This minor planet was named for...	Ref · Catalog
There are no named minor planets in this number range

== 306901–307000 ==
back to top

Named minor planet	Provisional	This minor planet was named for...	Ref · Catalog
There are no named minor planets in this number range

back to top

Preceded by 305,001–306,000	Meanings of minor-planet names List of minor planets: 306,001–307,000	Succeeded by 307,001–308,000
