= List of minor planets: 715001–716000 =

The following is a partial list of minor planets, running from minor-planet number 715001 through 716000, inclusive. The primary data for this and other partial lists is based on JPL's "Small-Body Orbital Elements" and data available from the Minor Planet Center. Critical list information is also provided by the MPC, unless otherwise specified from Lowell Observatory. A detailed description of the table's columns and additional sources are given on the main page including a complete list of every page in this series, and a statistical break-up on the dynamical classification of minor planets.

Also see the summary list of all named bodies in numerical and alphabetical order, and the corresponding naming citations for the number range of this particular list. New namings may only be added to this list after official publication, as the preannouncement of names is condemned by the Working Group for Small Bodies Nomenclature of the International Astronomical Union.

Near-Earth obj.	MBA (inner)	MBA (outer)	Centaur
Mars-crosser	MBA (middle)	Jupiter trojan	Trans-Neptunian obj.
Unclassified

== 715001–715100 ==
Designation			Discovery			Properties		Ref
Permanent	Provisional	Named after	Date	Site	Discoverer(s)	Category	Diam.	Ref
715001	2015 RD_{352}	—	September 9, 2015	Haleakala	Pan-STARRS 1	·	1.5 km	MPC · JPL
715002	2015 RO_{357}	—	September 11, 2015	Haleakala	Pan-STARRS 1	KOR	970 m	MPC · JPL
715003	2015 RQ_{363}	—	September 6, 2015	Kitt Peak	Spacewatch	AGN	940 m	MPC · JPL
715004	2015 RJ_{369}	—	March 15, 2007	Mount Lemmon	Mount Lemmon Survey	·	800 m	MPC · JPL
715005	2015 SK_{5}	—	January 20, 2009	Kitt Peak	Spacewatch	EUN	1.1 km	MPC · JPL
715006	2015 SM_{9}	—	May 2, 2014	Mount Lemmon	Mount Lemmon Survey	·	1.4 km	MPC · JPL
715007	2015 SX_{10}	—	October 26, 2011	Haleakala	Pan-STARRS 1	AGN	970 m	MPC · JPL
715008	2015 SL_{13}	—	October 15, 2012	Kitt Peak	Spacewatch	·	570 m	MPC · JPL
715009	2015 SL_{16}	—	September 6, 2015	Haleakala	Pan-STARRS 1	·	2.4 km	MPC · JPL
715010	2015 SO_{23}	—	September 23, 2015	Haleakala	Pan-STARRS 1	EOS	1.4 km	MPC · JPL
715011	2015 SC_{24}	—	September 23, 2015	Haleakala	Pan-STARRS 1	·	1.6 km	MPC · JPL
715012	2015 SQ_{24}	—	February 14, 2008	Mount Lemmon	Mount Lemmon Survey	·	1.9 km	MPC · JPL
715013	2015 SD_{25}	—	December 14, 2010	Kitt Peak	Spacewatch	·	1.9 km	MPC · JPL
715014	2015 SF_{26}	—	April 16, 2013	Haleakala	Pan-STARRS 1	·	2.7 km	MPC · JPL
715015	2015 SH_{26}	—	June 6, 2014	Haleakala	Pan-STARRS 1	·	1.8 km	MPC · JPL
715016	2015 SC_{28}	—	November 19, 2006	Kitt Peak	Spacewatch	·	1.6 km	MPC · JPL
715017	2015 SG_{28}	—	September 23, 2015	Haleakala	Pan-STARRS 1	·	2.0 km	MPC · JPL
715018	2015 SB_{29}	—	November 15, 2010	Kitt Peak	Spacewatch	·	1.6 km	MPC · JPL
715019	2015 SJ_{29}	—	August 19, 2014	Haleakala	Pan-STARRS 1	EOS	1.8 km	MPC · JPL
715020	2015 SV_{29}	—	September 23, 2015	Haleakala	Pan-STARRS 1	·	1.8 km	MPC · JPL
715021	2015 SF_{30}	—	February 8, 2011	Mount Lemmon	Mount Lemmon Survey	·	2.8 km	MPC · JPL
715022	2015 SO_{38}	—	September 4, 2011	Haleakala	Pan-STARRS 1	·	1.3 km	MPC · JPL
715023	2015 SS_{41}	—	September 24, 2015	Mount Lemmon	Mount Lemmon Survey	·	2.1 km	MPC · JPL
715024	2015 SM_{44}	—	September 23, 2015	Haleakala	Pan-STARRS 1	·	2.1 km	MPC · JPL
715025	2015 SO_{44}	—	September 18, 2015	Kitt Peak	Spacewatch	KOR	1.2 km	MPC · JPL
715026	2015 SL_{45}	—	September 23, 2015	Haleakala	Pan-STARRS 1	AGN	1.0 km	MPC · JPL
715027	2015 SP_{47}	—	September 23, 2015	Haleakala	Pan-STARRS 1	·	1.8 km	MPC · JPL
715028	2015 SC_{50}	—	September 23, 2015	Haleakala	Pan-STARRS 1	·	1.8 km	MPC · JPL
715029	2015 SP_{50}	—	September 23, 2015	Haleakala	Pan-STARRS 1	·	2.2 km	MPC · JPL
715030	2015 SF_{54}	—	September 18, 2015	Mount Lemmon	Mount Lemmon Survey	·	470 m	MPC · JPL
715031	2015 TB_{3}	—	September 28, 2006	Kitt Peak	Spacewatch	·	1.5 km	MPC · JPL
715032	2015 TB_{4}	—	October 29, 2005	Mount Lemmon	Mount Lemmon Survey	·	670 m	MPC · JPL
715033	2015 TV_{5}	—	October 24, 2011	Catalina	CSS	JUN	780 m	MPC · JPL
715034	2015 TP_{7}	—	October 25, 2011	Haleakala	Pan-STARRS 1	·	1.8 km	MPC · JPL
715035	2015 TU_{8}	—	September 30, 2006	Kitt Peak	Spacewatch	·	1.6 km	MPC · JPL
715036	2015 TU_{12}	—	October 11, 2007	Kitt Peak	Spacewatch	EUN	930 m	MPC · JPL
715037	2015 TQ_{15}	—	March 18, 2013	Mount Lemmon	Mount Lemmon Survey	·	1.8 km	MPC · JPL
715038	2015 TT_{16}	—	October 2, 2015	Haleakala	Pan-STARRS 1	·	2.5 km	MPC · JPL
715039	2015 TT_{18}	—	October 2, 2015	Haleakala	Pan-STARRS 1	HNS	960 m	MPC · JPL
715040	2015 TG_{19}	—	February 12, 2008	Mount Lemmon	Mount Lemmon Survey	·	2.1 km	MPC · JPL
715041	2015 TW_{19}	—	October 25, 2011	Haleakala	Pan-STARRS 1	·	1.6 km	MPC · JPL
715042	2015 TA_{20}	—	May 27, 2011	Catalina	CSS	·	840 m	MPC · JPL
715043	2015 TZ_{21}	—	July 25, 2015	Haleakala	Pan-STARRS 1	·	1.7 km	MPC · JPL
715044	2015 TR_{27}	—	July 24, 2015	Haleakala	Pan-STARRS 1	·	1.6 km	MPC · JPL
715045	2015 TP_{28}	—	May 3, 2009	Kitt Peak	Spacewatch	·	1.9 km	MPC · JPL
715046	2015 TQ_{29}	—	December 27, 2011	Mount Lemmon	Mount Lemmon Survey	·	2.0 km	MPC · JPL
715047	2015 TP_{30}	—	April 24, 2008	Kitt Peak	Spacewatch	EOS	1.5 km	MPC · JPL
715048	2015 TJ_{36}	—	November 24, 2011	Mount Lemmon	Mount Lemmon Survey	·	1.5 km	MPC · JPL
715049	2015 TW_{37}	—	May 20, 2014	Haleakala	Pan-STARRS 1	·	1.8 km	MPC · JPL
715050	2015 TR_{38}	—	December 16, 1995	Kitt Peak	Spacewatch	·	2.1 km	MPC · JPL
715051	2015 TF_{40}	—	October 16, 2006	Catalina	CSS	GEF	1.1 km	MPC · JPL
715052	2015 TN_{41}	—	November 17, 2006	Mount Lemmon	Mount Lemmon Survey	DOR	2.0 km	MPC · JPL
715053	2015 TJ_{43}	—	April 9, 2014	Mount Lemmon	Mount Lemmon Survey	·	1.5 km	MPC · JPL
715054	2015 TS_{46}	—	September 29, 2011	Mount Lemmon	Mount Lemmon Survey	AGN	960 m	MPC · JPL
715055	2015 TW_{48}	—	January 13, 2008	Kitt Peak	Spacewatch	·	1.6 km	MPC · JPL
715056	2015 TX_{48}	—	September 23, 2015	Mount Lemmon	Mount Lemmon Survey	·	740 m	MPC · JPL
715057	2015 TM_{50}	—	July 25, 2015	Haleakala	Pan-STARRS 1	HOF	1.9 km	MPC · JPL
715058	2015 TA_{51}	—	April 27, 2011	Mount Lemmon	Mount Lemmon Survey	·	690 m	MPC · JPL
715059	2015 TB_{52}	—	April 6, 2005	Kitt Peak	Spacewatch	·	1.6 km	MPC · JPL
715060	2015 TL_{52}	—	July 25, 2015	Haleakala	Pan-STARRS 1	·	1.8 km	MPC · JPL
715061	2015 TY_{52}	—	August 21, 2015	Haleakala	Pan-STARRS 1	·	2.1 km	MPC · JPL
715062	2015 TH_{59}	—	August 21, 2015	Haleakala	Pan-STARRS 1	·	1.8 km	MPC · JPL
715063	2015 TC_{62}	—	March 6, 2008	Mount Lemmon	Mount Lemmon Survey	·	1.5 km	MPC · JPL
715064	2015 TX_{63}	—	January 16, 2013	Mount Lemmon	Mount Lemmon Survey	·	570 m	MPC · JPL
715065	2015 TG_{64}	—	March 13, 2007	Mount Lemmon	Mount Lemmon Survey	·	2.4 km	MPC · JPL
715066	2015 TN_{68}	—	October 19, 2006	Mount Lemmon	Mount Lemmon Survey	·	1.5 km	MPC · JPL
715067	2015 TY_{72}	—	July 29, 2014	Haleakala	Pan-STARRS 1	·	1.8 km	MPC · JPL
715068	2015 TP_{78}	—	September 29, 2010	Mount Lemmon	Mount Lemmon Survey	·	1.6 km	MPC · JPL
715069	2015 TL_{79}	—	January 18, 2008	Kitt Peak	Spacewatch	·	1.1 km	MPC · JPL
715070	2015 TD_{80}	—	September 20, 2014	Haleakala	Pan-STARRS 1	·	3.7 km	MPC · JPL
715071	2015 TT_{81}	—	October 31, 2005	Kitt Peak	Spacewatch	·	1.6 km	MPC · JPL
715072	2015 TY_{81}	—	November 6, 2010	Kitt Peak	Spacewatch	·	1.7 km	MPC · JPL
715073	2015 TU_{83}	—	October 9, 2002	Palomar	NEAT	·	1.2 km	MPC · JPL
715074	2015 TH_{85}	—	October 8, 2015	Haleakala	Pan-STARRS 1	EOS	1.8 km	MPC · JPL
715075	2015 TF_{86}	—	November 5, 1999	Kitt Peak	Spacewatch	·	2.0 km	MPC · JPL
715076	2015 TP_{86}	—	April 22, 2007	Kitt Peak	Spacewatch	·	2.1 km	MPC · JPL
715077	2015 TE_{88}	—	May 14, 2008	Mount Lemmon	Mount Lemmon Survey	EOS	1.4 km	MPC · JPL
715078	2015 TR_{90}	—	February 27, 2012	Haleakala	Pan-STARRS 1	·	2.3 km	MPC · JPL
715079	2015 TL_{91}	—	September 9, 2015	Haleakala	Pan-STARRS 1	ADE	1.7 km	MPC · JPL
715080	2015 TD_{92}	—	April 10, 2013	Haleakala	Pan-STARRS 1	·	2.0 km	MPC · JPL
715081	2015 TG_{92}	—	December 11, 2010	Mount Lemmon	Mount Lemmon Survey	VER	2.3 km	MPC · JPL
715082	2015 TV_{94}	—	February 8, 2000	Apache Point	SDSS Collaboration	·	2.4 km	MPC · JPL
715083	2015 TG_{97}	—	April 30, 2012	Mount Lemmon	Mount Lemmon Survey	·	2.4 km	MPC · JPL
715084	2015 TD_{98}	—	September 9, 2015	Haleakala	Pan-STARRS 1	·	470 m	MPC · JPL
715085	2015 TH_{98}	—	March 6, 2008	Mount Lemmon	Mount Lemmon Survey	·	1.9 km	MPC · JPL
715086	2015 TL_{99}	—	August 18, 2014	Haleakala	Pan-STARRS 1	·	2.4 km	MPC · JPL
715087	2015 TP_{100}	—	September 7, 2000	Kitt Peak	Spacewatch	·	1.5 km	MPC · JPL
715088	2015 TY_{100}	—	October 8, 2015	Haleakala	Pan-STARRS 1	·	1.4 km	MPC · JPL
715089	2015 TK_{101}	—	January 2, 2012	Kitt Peak	Spacewatch	HOF	2.0 km	MPC · JPL
715090	2015 TV_{103}	—	July 30, 2014	Kitt Peak	Spacewatch	·	2.6 km	MPC · JPL
715091	2015 TY_{104}	—	February 8, 2007	Mount Lemmon	Mount Lemmon Survey	·	1.6 km	MPC · JPL
715092	2015 TH_{107}	—	March 27, 2008	Mount Lemmon	Mount Lemmon Survey	MRX	980 m	MPC · JPL
715093	2015 TD_{114}	—	October 8, 2015	Haleakala	Pan-STARRS 1	·	2.3 km	MPC · JPL
715094	2015 TM_{114}	—	April 11, 2013	Nogales	M. Schwartz, P. R. Holvorcem	·	1.7 km	MPC · JPL
715095	2015 TU_{114}	—	February 28, 2012	Haleakala	Pan-STARRS 1	·	1.5 km	MPC · JPL
715096	2015 TO_{115}	—	October 8, 2015	Haleakala	Pan-STARRS 1	·	2.3 km	MPC · JPL
715097	2015 TB_{116}	—	October 8, 2015	Haleakala	Pan-STARRS 1	EUN	1.0 km	MPC · JPL
715098	2015 TY_{116}	—	October 8, 2015	Haleakala	Pan-STARRS 1	·	1.8 km	MPC · JPL
715099	2015 TB_{121}	—	May 31, 2014	Haleakala	Pan-STARRS 1	·	1.5 km	MPC · JPL
715100	2015 TU_{121}	—	March 2, 2011	Mayhill-ISON	L. Elenin	TIR	2.5 km	MPC · JPL

== 715101–715200 ==
back to top

Designation			Discovery			Properties		Ref
Permanent	Provisional	Named after	Date	Site	Discoverer(s)	Category	Diam.	Ref
715101	2015 TV_{122}	—	October 8, 2015	Haleakala	Pan-STARRS 1	·	1.6 km	MPC · JPL
715102	2015 TP_{123}	—	October 11, 1999	Kitt Peak	Spacewatch	·	1.8 km	MPC · JPL
715103	2015 TB_{125}	—	June 22, 2014	Mount Lemmon	Mount Lemmon Survey	·	2.0 km	MPC · JPL
715104	2015 TP_{126}	—	November 13, 2010	Mount Lemmon	Mount Lemmon Survey	·	2.7 km	MPC · JPL
715105	2015 TU_{128}	—	September 15, 2009	Mount Lemmon	Mount Lemmon Survey	EOS	1.4 km	MPC · JPL
715106	2015 TO_{130}	—	October 8, 2015	Haleakala	Pan-STARRS 1	EOS	1.5 km	MPC · JPL
715107	2015 TB_{133}	—	November 27, 2010	Mount Lemmon	Mount Lemmon Survey	·	1.8 km	MPC · JPL
715108	2015 TL_{133}	—	August 12, 2015	Haleakala	Pan-STARRS 1	·	2.0 km	MPC · JPL
715109	2015 TR_{133}	—	December 13, 2006	Mount Lemmon	Mount Lemmon Survey	·	2.0 km	MPC · JPL
715110	2015 TF_{135}	—	January 8, 2011	Mount Lemmon	Mount Lemmon Survey	·	2.6 km	MPC · JPL
715111	2015 TX_{135}	—	October 8, 2015	Haleakala	Pan-STARRS 1	·	1.6 km	MPC · JPL
715112	2015 TB_{137}	—	October 8, 2015	Haleakala	Pan-STARRS 1	·	2.1 km	MPC · JPL
715113	2015 TE_{138}	—	October 8, 2015	Haleakala	Pan-STARRS 1	·	1.8 km	MPC · JPL
715114	2015 TL_{138}	—	April 11, 2013	Kitt Peak	Spacewatch	·	1.6 km	MPC · JPL
715115	2015 TY_{138}	—	July 3, 2014	Haleakala	Pan-STARRS 1	·	2.7 km	MPC · JPL
715116	2015 TP_{140}	—	July 4, 2014	Haleakala	Pan-STARRS 1	EOS	1.5 km	MPC · JPL
715117	2015 TF_{141}	—	January 17, 2008	Mount Lemmon	Mount Lemmon Survey	·	1.6 km	MPC · JPL
715118	2015 TN_{147}	—	September 9, 2015	Haleakala	Pan-STARRS 1	·	2.7 km	MPC · JPL
715119	2015 TZ_{148}	—	October 13, 2006	Kitt Peak	Spacewatch	·	1.7 km	MPC · JPL
715120	2015 TF_{150}	—	September 18, 2010	Mount Lemmon	Mount Lemmon Survey	KOR	1.2 km	MPC · JPL
715121	2015 TZ_{150}	—	September 17, 2010	Mount Lemmon	Mount Lemmon Survey	KOR	1.1 km	MPC · JPL
715122	2015 TA_{154}	—	September 17, 2010	Mount Lemmon	Mount Lemmon Survey	KOR	1.1 km	MPC · JPL
715123	2015 TU_{156}	—	March 13, 2013	Mount Lemmon	Mount Lemmon Survey	KOR	1.1 km	MPC · JPL
715124	2015 TN_{159}	—	September 11, 2010	Kitt Peak	Spacewatch	KOR	1.1 km	MPC · JPL
715125	2015 TX_{159}	—	March 17, 2013	Mount Lemmon	Mount Lemmon Survey	KOR	1.3 km	MPC · JPL
715126	2015 TY_{159}	—	September 18, 2010	Mount Lemmon	Mount Lemmon Survey	·	1.3 km	MPC · JPL
715127	2015 TE_{161}	—	October 4, 2006	Mount Lemmon	Mount Lemmon Survey	NEM	2.3 km	MPC · JPL
715128	2015 TD_{162}	—	September 14, 2006	Catalina	CSS	·	1.7 km	MPC · JPL
715129	2015 TQ_{163}	—	August 19, 2006	Kitt Peak	Spacewatch	·	1.7 km	MPC · JPL
715130	2015 TC_{165}	—	June 26, 2011	Mount Lemmon	Mount Lemmon Survey	·	990 m	MPC · JPL
715131	2015 TK_{167}	—	February 8, 2008	Kitt Peak	Spacewatch	BRA	1.3 km	MPC · JPL
715132	2015 TF_{170}	—	October 9, 2015	Haleakala	Pan-STARRS 1	EOS	1.4 km	MPC · JPL
715133	2015 TP_{173}	—	October 19, 2006	Mount Lemmon	Mount Lemmon Survey	·	1.9 km	MPC · JPL
715134	2015 TW_{173}	—	November 19, 2006	Catalina	CSS	·	1.7 km	MPC · JPL
715135	2015 TG_{176}	—	December 13, 2010	Mount Lemmon	Mount Lemmon Survey	·	2.4 km	MPC · JPL
715136	2015 TJ_{178}	—	October 12, 2015	Mount Lemmon	Mount Lemmon Survey	H	640 m	MPC · JPL
715137	2015 TZ_{179}	—	December 9, 2010	Kitt Peak	Spacewatch	EOS	1.8 km	MPC · JPL
715138	2015 TM_{180}	—	January 17, 2005	Kitt Peak	Spacewatch	·	1.3 km	MPC · JPL
715139	2015 TG_{182}	—	July 26, 2015	Haleakala	Pan-STARRS 1	·	1.6 km	MPC · JPL
715140	2015 TK_{182}	—	February 7, 2008	Catalina	CSS	·	2.1 km	MPC · JPL
715141	2015 TS_{184}	—	February 10, 2008	Kitt Peak	Spacewatch	·	1.7 km	MPC · JPL
715142	2015 TV_{185}	—	October 9, 2015	Haleakala	Pan-STARRS 1	VER	2.1 km	MPC · JPL
715143	2015 TY_{189}	—	September 3, 2010	Mount Lemmon	Mount Lemmon Survey	EOS	1.7 km	MPC · JPL
715144	2015 TC_{191}	—	April 4, 2014	Kitt Peak	Spacewatch	·	2.1 km	MPC · JPL
715145	2015 TJ_{191}	—	October 16, 2001	Kitt Peak	Spacewatch	·	1.7 km	MPC · JPL
715146	2015 TS_{194}	—	October 18, 2011	Mount Lemmon	Mount Lemmon Survey	·	1.5 km	MPC · JPL
715147	2015 TM_{196}	—	August 12, 2015	Haleakala	Pan-STARRS 1	LIX	3.0 km	MPC · JPL
715148	2015 TO_{196}	—	March 19, 2009	Kitt Peak	Spacewatch	·	1.7 km	MPC · JPL
715149	2015 TE_{200}	—	February 12, 2000	Apache Point	SDSS Collaboration	·	800 m	MPC · JPL
715150	2015 TH_{200}	—	February 14, 2013	Haleakala	Pan-STARRS 1	EUN	1.1 km	MPC · JPL
715151	2015 TD_{204}	—	January 15, 2008	Mount Lemmon	Mount Lemmon Survey	·	1.1 km	MPC · JPL
715152	2015 TX_{206}	—	August 10, 2010	Kitt Peak	Spacewatch	KOR	1.2 km	MPC · JPL
715153	2015 TQ_{207}	—	July 25, 2015	Haleakala	Pan-STARRS 1	·	1.8 km	MPC · JPL
715154	2015 TS_{210}	—	October 11, 2007	Mount Lemmon	Mount Lemmon Survey	·	1.1 km	MPC · JPL
715155	2015 TS_{211}	—	October 24, 2011	Haleakala	Pan-STARRS 1	·	1.6 km	MPC · JPL
715156	2015 TT_{211}	—	February 25, 2007	Mount Lemmon	Mount Lemmon Survey	EOS	1.5 km	MPC · JPL
715157	2015 TM_{213}	—	November 17, 2011	Mount Lemmon	Mount Lemmon Survey	·	1.4 km	MPC · JPL
715158	2015 TT_{213}	—	January 14, 2008	Kitt Peak	Spacewatch	·	1.7 km	MPC · JPL
715159	2015 TL_{214}	—	September 12, 2015	Haleakala	Pan-STARRS 1	·	530 m	MPC · JPL
715160	2015 TQ_{215}	—	September 12, 2015	Haleakala	Pan-STARRS 1	KOR	980 m	MPC · JPL
715161	2015 TF_{216}	—	September 11, 2015	Haleakala	Pan-STARRS 1	·	1.4 km	MPC · JPL
715162	2015 TK_{217}	—	November 3, 2010	Mount Lemmon	Mount Lemmon Survey	·	2.2 km	MPC · JPL
715163	2015 TK_{219}	—	September 18, 2006	Kitt Peak	Spacewatch	·	1.7 km	MPC · JPL
715164	2015 TJ_{220}	—	August 21, 2006	Piszkéstető	K. Sárneczky, Kuli, Z.	·	1.2 km	MPC · JPL
715165	2015 TZ_{223}	—	October 10, 2002	Palomar	NEAT	·	1.5 km	MPC · JPL
715166	2015 TC_{225}	—	September 30, 2006	Catalina	CSS	·	1.7 km	MPC · JPL
715167	2015 TU_{226}	—	January 31, 2013	Mount Lemmon	Mount Lemmon Survey	MAR	940 m	MPC · JPL
715168	2015 TQ_{227}	—	October 10, 2015	Haleakala	Pan-STARRS 1	·	2.0 km	MPC · JPL
715169	2015 TZ_{228}	—	October 23, 2011	Haleakala	Pan-STARRS 1	EUN	1.1 km	MPC · JPL
715170	2015 TF_{234}	—	August 27, 2005	Palomar	NEAT	·	570 m	MPC · JPL
715171	2015 TH_{235}	—	March 31, 2008	Mount Lemmon	Mount Lemmon Survey	·	1.9 km	MPC · JPL
715172	2015 TY_{235}	—	July 25, 2015	Haleakala	Pan-STARRS 1	·	2.4 km	MPC · JPL
715173	2015 TX_{240}	—	November 7, 2010	Mount Lemmon	Mount Lemmon Survey	·	1.6 km	MPC · JPL
715174	2015 TG_{242}	—	October 3, 2006	Mount Lemmon	Mount Lemmon Survey	NEM	2.1 km	MPC · JPL
715175	2015 TU_{242}	—	November 26, 2012	Mount Lemmon	Mount Lemmon Survey	·	540 m	MPC · JPL
715176	2015 TF_{243}	—	September 9, 2015	Haleakala	Pan-STARRS 1	AGN	950 m	MPC · JPL
715177	2015 TH_{244}	—	February 23, 2007	Kitt Peak	Spacewatch	·	2.4 km	MPC · JPL
715178	2015 TJ_{244}	—	October 10, 2015	Atom Site	Space Surveillance Telescope	·	740 m	MPC · JPL
715179	2015 TS_{245}	—	February 8, 2013	Haleakala	Pan-STARRS 1	·	1.6 km	MPC · JPL
715180	2015 TO_{246}	—	April 13, 1997	Kitt Peak	Spacewatch	·	1.8 km	MPC · JPL
715181	2015 TS_{246}	—	December 16, 2007	Kitt Peak	Spacewatch	·	1.3 km	MPC · JPL
715182	2015 TE_{247}	—	November 15, 2007	Mount Lemmon	Mount Lemmon Survey	·	1.4 km	MPC · JPL
715183	2015 TZ_{249}	—	March 8, 2013	Haleakala	Pan-STARRS 1	·	1.5 km	MPC · JPL
715184	2015 TB_{252}	—	September 25, 2006	Kitt Peak	Spacewatch	·	1.8 km	MPC · JPL
715185	2015 TH_{256}	—	December 2, 2004	Kitt Peak	Spacewatch	·	3.5 km	MPC · JPL
715186	2015 TC_{258}	—	December 26, 2011	Mount Lemmon	Mount Lemmon Survey	EUN	1.3 km	MPC · JPL
715187	2015 TS_{259}	—	October 11, 2015	Atom Site	Space Surveillance Telescope	·	1.4 km	MPC · JPL
715188	2015 TT_{261}	—	September 6, 2015	XuYi	PMO NEO Survey Program	EUN	1.0 km	MPC · JPL
715189	2015 TY_{261}	—	July 23, 2015	Haleakala	Pan-STARRS 1	·	570 m	MPC · JPL
715190	2015 TT_{262}	—	October 12, 2015	Haleakala	Pan-STARRS 1	·	1.8 km	MPC · JPL
715191	2015 TA_{264}	—	December 16, 2007	Kitt Peak	Spacewatch	·	2.1 km	MPC · JPL
715192	2015 TJ_{267}	—	September 24, 2011	Mount Lemmon	Mount Lemmon Survey	·	1.6 km	MPC · JPL
715193	2015 TK_{268}	—	May 25, 2014	Haleakala	Pan-STARRS 1	·	1.4 km	MPC · JPL
715194	2015 TS_{269}	—	October 12, 2015	Haleakala	Pan-STARRS 1	V	480 m	MPC · JPL
715195	2015 TS_{271}	—	March 6, 2013	Haleakala	Pan-STARRS 1	·	1.6 km	MPC · JPL
715196	2015 TD_{272}	—	October 23, 2006	Kitt Peak	Spacewatch	·	1.8 km	MPC · JPL
715197	2015 TG_{272}	—	October 12, 2015	Haleakala	Pan-STARRS 1	EOS	1.5 km	MPC · JPL
715198	2015 TH_{272}	—	March 15, 2008	Kitt Peak	Spacewatch	·	2.4 km	MPC · JPL
715199	2015 TR_{272}	—	October 13, 2010	Kitt Peak	Spacewatch	·	1.7 km	MPC · JPL
715200	2015 TR_{273}	—	May 6, 2014	Haleakala	Pan-STARRS 1	·	1.3 km	MPC · JPL

== 715201–715300 ==
back to top

Designation			Discovery			Properties		Ref
Permanent	Provisional	Named after	Date	Site	Discoverer(s)	Category	Diam.	Ref
715201	2015 TA_{274}	—	October 13, 2006	Kitt Peak	Spacewatch	HOF	2.3 km	MPC · JPL
715202	2015 TA_{278}	—	September 12, 2015	Haleakala	Pan-STARRS 1	·	560 m	MPC · JPL
715203	2015 TL_{278}	—	August 13, 2010	Kitt Peak	Spacewatch	615	1.1 km	MPC · JPL
715204	2015 TU_{278}	—	September 2, 2010	Mount Lemmon	Mount Lemmon Survey	·	1.6 km	MPC · JPL
715205	2015 TV_{278}	—	November 2, 2010	Mount Lemmon	Mount Lemmon Survey	·	2.3 km	MPC · JPL
715206	2015 TN_{283}	—	March 12, 2013	Mount Lemmon	Mount Lemmon Survey	·	1.7 km	MPC · JPL
715207	2015 TQ_{286}	—	September 15, 2010	Kitt Peak	Spacewatch	·	1.7 km	MPC · JPL
715208	2015 TK_{288}	—	September 12, 2015	Haleakala	Pan-STARRS 1	·	1.4 km	MPC · JPL
715209	2015 TS_{291}	—	April 24, 2000	Kitt Peak	Spacewatch	·	780 m	MPC · JPL
715210	2015 TE_{292}	—	September 11, 2015	Haleakala	Pan-STARRS 1	KOR	990 m	MPC · JPL
715211	2015 TJ_{296}	—	September 12, 2015	Haleakala	Pan-STARRS 1	HOF	1.8 km	MPC · JPL
715212	2015 TP_{296}	—	March 6, 2013	Haleakala	Pan-STARRS 1	·	1.5 km	MPC · JPL
715213	2015 TY_{296}	—	October 26, 2011	Haleakala	Pan-STARRS 1	·	1.3 km	MPC · JPL
715214	2015 TM_{297}	—	December 21, 2008	Mount Lemmon	Mount Lemmon Survey	·	990 m	MPC · JPL
715215	2015 TW_{297}	—	March 12, 2008	Kitt Peak	Spacewatch	KOR	1.3 km	MPC · JPL
715216	2015 TV_{299}	—	April 9, 2013	Haleakala	Pan-STARRS 1	·	1.8 km	MPC · JPL
715217	2015 TB_{302}	—	October 12, 2015	Haleakala	Pan-STARRS 1	·	1.6 km	MPC · JPL
715218	2015 TD_{303}	—	October 29, 2011	Haleakala	Pan-STARRS 1	·	1.3 km	MPC · JPL
715219	2015 TM_{305}	—	October 12, 2015	Haleakala	Pan-STARRS 1	EOS	1.4 km	MPC · JPL
715220	2015 TR_{306}	—	June 27, 2014	Haleakala	Pan-STARRS 1	·	1.7 km	MPC · JPL
715221	2015 TF_{309}	—	October 12, 2015	Haleakala	Pan-STARRS 1	·	1.7 km	MPC · JPL
715222	2015 TD_{311}	—	October 12, 2015	Haleakala	Pan-STARRS 1	·	2.2 km	MPC · JPL
715223	2015 TM_{311}	—	October 12, 2015	Haleakala	Pan-STARRS 1	·	1.9 km	MPC · JPL
715224	2015 TE_{312}	—	September 25, 2015	Haleakala	Pan-STARRS 1	526	2.4 km	MPC · JPL
715225	2015 TV_{312}	—	September 9, 2015	Haleakala	Pan-STARRS 1	·	560 m	MPC · JPL
715226	2015 TQ_{315}	—	October 13, 2015	Kitt Peak	Spacewatch	·	1.5 km	MPC · JPL
715227	2015 TD_{316}	—	September 15, 2010	Mount Lemmon	Mount Lemmon Survey	·	1.7 km	MPC · JPL
715228	2015 TH_{316}	—	September 12, 2015	Haleakala	Pan-STARRS 1	KOR	1.1 km	MPC · JPL
715229	2015 TA_{317}	—	October 13, 2015	Mount Lemmon	Mount Lemmon Survey	·	490 m	MPC · JPL
715230	2015 TC_{317}	—	October 1, 2010	Mount Lemmon	Mount Lemmon Survey	·	1.6 km	MPC · JPL
715231	2015 TF_{317}	—	May 31, 2003	Cerro Tololo	Deep Ecliptic Survey	·	1.5 km	MPC · JPL
715232	2015 TY_{317}	—	April 7, 2013	Mount Lemmon	Mount Lemmon Survey	·	1.7 km	MPC · JPL
715233	2015 TH_{318}	—	October 12, 2015	Mount Lemmon	Mount Lemmon Survey	EUP	3.5 km	MPC · JPL
715234	2015 TW_{318}	—	October 29, 2010	Mount Lemmon	Mount Lemmon Survey	·	1.7 km	MPC · JPL
715235	2015 TY_{318}	—	October 29, 2010	Mount Lemmon	Mount Lemmon Survey	KOR	1.1 km	MPC · JPL
715236	2015 TF_{320}	—	March 7, 2013	Kitt Peak	Spacewatch	AST	1.4 km	MPC · JPL
715237	2015 TL_{322}	—	August 12, 2015	Haleakala	Pan-STARRS 1	·	1.6 km	MPC · JPL
715238	2015 TX_{322}	—	October 14, 2015	Mount Lemmon	Mount Lemmon Survey	TIN	860 m	MPC · JPL
715239	2015 TR_{323}	—	October 12, 2015	Haleakala	Pan-STARRS 1	·	2.3 km	MPC · JPL
715240	2015 TE_{324}	—	October 19, 2006	Mount Lemmon	Mount Lemmon Survey	HNS	1.1 km	MPC · JPL
715241	2015 TA_{327}	—	July 2, 2014	Haleakala	Pan-STARRS 1	·	1.8 km	MPC · JPL
715242	2015 TG_{329}	—	September 23, 2015	Haleakala	Pan-STARRS 1	·	1.6 km	MPC · JPL
715243	2015 TN_{330}	—	October 13, 2015	Haleakala	Pan-STARRS 1	·	1.6 km	MPC · JPL
715244	2015 TJ_{331}	—	February 14, 2013	Haleakala	Pan-STARRS 1	EUN	860 m	MPC · JPL
715245	2015 TJ_{332}	—	December 2, 2010	Kitt Peak	Spacewatch	·	2.6 km	MPC · JPL
715246	2015 TK_{332}	—	December 10, 2010	Mount Lemmon	Mount Lemmon Survey	EOS	1.6 km	MPC · JPL
715247	2015 TD_{333}	—	July 3, 2014	Haleakala	Pan-STARRS 1	EOS	1.6 km	MPC · JPL
715248	2015 TY_{334}	—	January 24, 2007	Mount Lemmon	Mount Lemmon Survey	·	1.9 km	MPC · JPL
715249	2015 TL_{336}	—	October 14, 2015	Kitt Peak	Spacewatch	·	1.3 km	MPC · JPL
715250	2015 TV_{337}	—	July 5, 2011	Haleakala	Pan-STARRS 1	·	1.7 km	MPC · JPL
715251	2015 TY_{339}	—	September 28, 2011	Kitt Peak	Spacewatch	HNS	1.2 km	MPC · JPL
715252	2015 TO_{347}	—	November 11, 2007	Mount Lemmon	Mount Lemmon Survey	·	1.3 km	MPC · JPL
715253	2015 TS_{347}	—	October 11, 2010	Mount Lemmon	Mount Lemmon Survey	·	1.5 km	MPC · JPL
715254	2015 TW_{347}	—	May 28, 2014	Haleakala	Pan-STARRS 1	·	880 m	MPC · JPL
715255	2015 TC_{354}	—	October 3, 2015	Mount Lemmon	Mount Lemmon Survey	·	1.4 km	MPC · JPL
715256	2015 TE_{359}	—	October 12, 2015	Haleakala	Pan-STARRS 1	·	1.5 km	MPC · JPL
715257	2015 TF_{360}	—	October 23, 2006	Mount Lemmon	Mount Lemmon Survey	·	1.6 km	MPC · JPL
715258	2015 TK_{360}	—	October 2, 2006	Mount Lemmon	Mount Lemmon Survey	·	1.5 km	MPC · JPL
715259	2015 TJ_{366}	—	January 30, 2008	Mount Lemmon	Mount Lemmon Survey	·	1.7 km	MPC · JPL
715260	2015 TP_{366}	—	January 13, 2008	Mount Lemmon	Mount Lemmon Survey	·	1.5 km	MPC · JPL
715261	2015 TQ_{367}	—	October 9, 2015	Mount Lemmon	Mount Lemmon Survey	·	2.1 km	MPC · JPL
715262	2015 TA_{370}	—	November 12, 2010	Mount Lemmon	Mount Lemmon Survey	·	2.6 km	MPC · JPL
715263	2015 TF_{370}	—	October 25, 2005	Mount Lemmon	Mount Lemmon Survey	·	1.7 km	MPC · JPL
715264	2015 TP_{370}	—	August 29, 2006	Kitt Peak	Spacewatch	·	1.4 km	MPC · JPL
715265	2015 TF_{371}	—	November 26, 2005	Kitt Peak	Spacewatch	·	1.5 km	MPC · JPL
715266	2015 TN_{372}	—	March 2, 2006	Kitt Peak	Spacewatch	THM	2.0 km	MPC · JPL
715267	2015 TF_{373}	—	February 20, 2012	Haleakala	Pan-STARRS 1	·	2.8 km	MPC · JPL
715268	2015 TU_{373}	—	December 10, 2010	Mount Lemmon	Mount Lemmon Survey	·	2.1 km	MPC · JPL
715269	2015 TC_{374}	—	October 8, 2015	Haleakala	Pan-STARRS 1	·	1.5 km	MPC · JPL
715270	2015 TG_{374}	—	September 20, 2014	Haleakala	Pan-STARRS 1	·	2.6 km	MPC · JPL
715271	2015 TJ_{374}	—	August 3, 2014	Haleakala	Pan-STARRS 1	·	1.9 km	MPC · JPL
715272	2015 TS_{374}	—	October 8, 2015	Haleakala	Pan-STARRS 1	·	1.5 km	MPC · JPL
715273	2015 TZ_{374}	—	October 8, 2015	Haleakala	Pan-STARRS 1	·	1.6 km	MPC · JPL
715274	2015 TC_{375}	—	October 8, 2015	Haleakala	Pan-STARRS 1	·	1.6 km	MPC · JPL
715275	2015 TH_{375}	—	October 9, 2015	Nogales	M. Schwartz, P. R. Holvorcem	EOS	1.4 km	MPC · JPL
715276	2015 TL_{376}	—	July 30, 2014	Haleakala	Pan-STARRS 1	EOS	1.5 km	MPC · JPL
715277	2015 TN_{376}	—	November 11, 2010	Mount Lemmon	Mount Lemmon Survey	·	1.3 km	MPC · JPL
715278	2015 TX_{376}	—	February 1, 2012	Mount Lemmon	Mount Lemmon Survey	HOF	2.0 km	MPC · JPL
715279	2015 TN_{379}	—	October 10, 2015	Haleakala	Pan-STARRS 1	·	1.6 km	MPC · JPL
715280	2015 TQ_{379}	—	April 19, 2013	Haleakala	Pan-STARRS 1	·	2.0 km	MPC · JPL
715281	2015 TZ_{380}	—	April 15, 2012	Haleakala	Pan-STARRS 1	·	2.6 km	MPC · JPL
715282	2015 TE_{381}	—	October 10, 2015	Haleakala	Pan-STARRS 1	·	1.4 km	MPC · JPL
715283	2015 TH_{381}	—	November 11, 2001	Apache Point	SDSS Collaboration	·	1.8 km	MPC · JPL
715284	2015 TO_{382}	—	December 31, 2007	Mount Lemmon	Mount Lemmon Survey	·	1.5 km	MPC · JPL
715285	2015 TU_{383}	—	March 10, 2003	Palomar	NEAT	·	2.1 km	MPC · JPL
715286	2015 TW_{384}	—	June 27, 2014	Haleakala	Pan-STARRS 1	·	1.4 km	MPC · JPL
715287	2015 TB_{385}	—	October 12, 2015	Haleakala	Pan-STARRS 1	BRA	1.3 km	MPC · JPL
715288	2015 TL_{385}	—	May 10, 2014	Haleakala	Pan-STARRS 1	·	1.4 km	MPC · JPL
715289	2015 TX_{387}	—	October 11, 2015	Cerro Paranal	Altmann, M., Prusti, T.	·	2.2 km	MPC · JPL
715290	2015 TR_{408}	—	October 10, 2015	Haleakala	Pan-STARRS 1	EOS	1.5 km	MPC · JPL
715291	2015 TT_{408}	—	July 2, 2014	Haleakala	Pan-STARRS 1	·	1.7 km	MPC · JPL
715292	2015 TB_{411}	—	July 1, 2014	Haleakala	Pan-STARRS 1	EOS	1.3 km	MPC · JPL
715293	2015 TD_{411}	—	October 15, 2015	Haleakala	Pan-STARRS 1	·	1.5 km	MPC · JPL
715294	2015 TB_{413}	—	October 9, 2015	Haleakala	Pan-STARRS 1	·	540 m	MPC · JPL
715295	2015 TR_{413}	—	October 1, 2015	Mount Lemmon	Mount Lemmon Survey	T_{j} (2.99) · EUP	2.7 km	MPC · JPL
715296	2015 TB_{416}	—	October 8, 2015	Haleakala	Pan-STARRS 1	VER	2.0 km	MPC · JPL
715297	2015 TD_{417}	—	October 10, 2015	Haleakala	Pan-STARRS 1	·	1.3 km	MPC · JPL
715298	2015 TG_{417}	—	October 10, 2015	Haleakala	Pan-STARRS 1	·	480 m	MPC · JPL
715299	2015 TD_{424}	—	October 12, 2015	Haleakala	Pan-STARRS 1	·	2.6 km	MPC · JPL
715300	2015 TC_{428}	—	October 13, 2015	Haleakala	Pan-STARRS 1	EOS	1.5 km	MPC · JPL

== 715301–715400 ==
back to top

Designation			Discovery			Properties		Ref
Permanent	Provisional	Named after	Date	Site	Discoverer(s)	Category	Diam.	Ref
715301	2015 TP_{429}	—	October 3, 2015	Mount Lemmon	Mount Lemmon Survey	·	1.8 km	MPC · JPL
715302	2015 TN_{430}	—	August 29, 2009	Kitt Peak	Spacewatch	·	1.9 km	MPC · JPL
715303	2015 TC_{436}	—	October 12, 2015	Haleakala	Pan-STARRS 1	EOS	1.3 km	MPC · JPL
715304	2015 TS_{436}	—	October 2, 2015	Mount Lemmon	Mount Lemmon Survey	·	1.4 km	MPC · JPL
715305	2015 TD_{445}	—	October 8, 2015	Haleakala	Pan-STARRS 1	·	1.7 km	MPC · JPL
715306	2015 TU_{449}	—	January 27, 2012	Mount Lemmon	Mount Lemmon Survey	·	1.4 km	MPC · JPL
715307	2015 TG_{456}	—	November 8, 2010	Mount Lemmon	Mount Lemmon Survey	·	2.1 km	MPC · JPL
715308	2015 TO_{457}	—	October 12, 2015	Haleakala	Pan-STARRS 1	·	2.1 km	MPC · JPL
715309	2015 TV_{461}	—	October 10, 2015	Haleakala	Pan-STARRS 1	·	1.5 km	MPC · JPL
715310	2015 TF_{464}	—	October 2, 2015	Mount Lemmon	Mount Lemmon Survey	·	1.5 km	MPC · JPL
715311	2015 TM_{485}	—	October 9, 2015	Haleakala	Pan-STARRS 1	·	1.5 km	MPC · JPL
715312	2015 UC_{1}	—	December 22, 2005	Kitt Peak	Spacewatch	THM	2.3 km	MPC · JPL
715313	2015 UH_{5}	—	October 16, 2015	Mount Lemmon	Mount Lemmon Survey	KOR	1.2 km	MPC · JPL
715314	2015 UG_{9}	—	November 28, 2011	Kitt Peak	Spacewatch	·	1.7 km	MPC · JPL
715315	2015 UM_{9}	—	October 9, 2010	Mount Lemmon	Mount Lemmon Survey	·	1.3 km	MPC · JPL
715316	2015 UW_{9}	—	February 11, 2004	Kitt Peak	Spacewatch	·	1.4 km	MPC · JPL
715317	2015 UR_{10}	—	October 31, 2007	Mount Lemmon	Mount Lemmon Survey	·	1.1 km	MPC · JPL
715318	2015 UJ_{12}	—	October 20, 2006	Mount Lemmon	Mount Lemmon Survey	·	1.7 km	MPC · JPL
715319	2015 US_{13}	—	September 12, 2015	Haleakala	Pan-STARRS 1	AGN	920 m	MPC · JPL
715320	2015 UV_{13}	—	April 29, 2009	Cerro Burek	I. de la Cueva	KOR	1.1 km	MPC · JPL
715321	2015 UD_{15}	—	October 18, 2015	Haleakala	Pan-STARRS 1	V	450 m	MPC · JPL
715322	2015 UL_{17}	—	October 30, 2005	Kitt Peak	Spacewatch	·	1.5 km	MPC · JPL
715323	2015 UC_{18}	—	December 18, 2007	Mount Lemmon	Mount Lemmon Survey	·	1.3 km	MPC · JPL
715324	2015 UL_{18}	—	November 4, 2004	Kitt Peak	Spacewatch	THM	1.9 km	MPC · JPL
715325	2015 UR_{21}	—	September 6, 2010	Piszkés-tető	K. Sárneczky, Z. Kuli	KOR	1.1 km	MPC · JPL
715326	2015 UP_{22}	—	September 18, 2010	Mount Lemmon	Mount Lemmon Survey	KOR	1.1 km	MPC · JPL
715327	2015 UY_{22}	—	February 14, 2013	Haleakala	Pan-STARRS 1	·	1.7 km	MPC · JPL
715328	2015 UW_{23}	—	October 3, 2006	Mount Lemmon	Mount Lemmon Survey	AGN	980 m	MPC · JPL
715329	2015 UG_{24}	—	October 8, 2010	Kitt Peak	Spacewatch	·	1.7 km	MPC · JPL
715330	2015 UW_{27}	—	October 19, 2010	Mount Lemmon	Mount Lemmon Survey	·	1.5 km	MPC · JPL
715331	2015 UY_{27}	—	September 9, 2015	Haleakala	Pan-STARRS 1	KOR	940 m	MPC · JPL
715332	2015 UG_{28}	—	October 15, 2015	Mount Lemmon	Mount Lemmon Survey	·	1.9 km	MPC · JPL
715333	2015 UH_{30}	—	March 10, 2008	Kitt Peak	Spacewatch	·	1.8 km	MPC · JPL
715334	2015 UQ_{32}	—	February 2, 2008	Kitt Peak	Spacewatch	·	1.8 km	MPC · JPL
715335	2015 US_{34}	—	September 1, 2010	Mount Lemmon	Mount Lemmon Survey	·	1.4 km	MPC · JPL
715336	2015 UH_{36}	—	May 28, 2014	Haleakala	Pan-STARRS 1	·	1.1 km	MPC · JPL
715337	2015 UC_{37}	—	March 14, 2012	Haleakala	Pan-STARRS 1	·	2.6 km	MPC · JPL
715338	2015 UZ_{37}	—	September 17, 2010	Mount Lemmon	Mount Lemmon Survey	KOR	1.1 km	MPC · JPL
715339	2015 UJ_{41}	—	September 11, 2015	Haleakala	Pan-STARRS 1	KOR	1.1 km	MPC · JPL
715340	2015 UZ_{41}	—	October 9, 2015	Haleakala	Pan-STARRS 1	·	1.8 km	MPC · JPL
715341	2015 UQ_{42}	—	June 12, 2011	Mount Lemmon	Mount Lemmon Survey	·	1.1 km	MPC · JPL
715342	2015 UU_{43}	—	January 10, 2008	Mount Lemmon	Mount Lemmon Survey	·	1.6 km	MPC · JPL
715343	2015 UU_{54}	—	October 1, 2010	Mount Lemmon	Mount Lemmon Survey	KOR	1.1 km	MPC · JPL
715344	2015 UU_{55}	—	September 23, 2015	Haleakala	Pan-STARRS 1	·	2.1 km	MPC · JPL
715345	2015 US_{57}	—	July 25, 2014	Haleakala	Pan-STARRS 1	EOS	1.3 km	MPC · JPL
715346	2015 UY_{57}	—	October 8, 2015	Haleakala	Pan-STARRS 1	URS	2.1 km	MPC · JPL
715347	2015 UJ_{59}	—	December 29, 2005	Kitt Peak	Spacewatch	EOS	1.7 km	MPC · JPL
715348	2015 UT_{59}	—	September 7, 2004	Kitt Peak	Spacewatch	·	1.5 km	MPC · JPL
715349	2015 UV_{59}	—	March 5, 2002	Apache Point	SDSS Collaboration	·	1.7 km	MPC · JPL
715350	2015 UR_{60}	—	September 12, 2015	Haleakala	Pan-STARRS 1	·	1.3 km	MPC · JPL
715351	2015 UV_{62}	—	September 12, 2015	Haleakala	Pan-STARRS 1	·	2.4 km	MPC · JPL
715352	2015 UC_{64}	—	July 4, 2005	Kitt Peak	Spacewatch	·	1.7 km	MPC · JPL
715353	2015 UD_{68}	—	October 26, 2011	Haleakala	Pan-STARRS 1	·	1.5 km	MPC · JPL
715354	2015 UY_{68}	—	February 14, 2013	Mount Lemmon	Mount Lemmon Survey	HNS	980 m	MPC · JPL
715355	2015 UR_{69}	—	September 5, 2000	Kitt Peak	Spacewatch	KOR	1.2 km	MPC · JPL
715356	2015 UY_{73}	—	September 12, 2005	Kitt Peak	Spacewatch	·	1.7 km	MPC · JPL
715357	2015 UF_{74}	—	January 30, 2011	Catalina	CSS	·	3.1 km	MPC · JPL
715358	2015 UZ_{75}	—	September 4, 2010	Kitt Peak	Spacewatch	·	2.1 km	MPC · JPL
715359	2015 UY_{78}	—	May 24, 2014	Mount Lemmon	Mount Lemmon Survey	ADE	1.6 km	MPC · JPL
715360	2015 UL_{80}	—	April 8, 2014	Haleakala	Pan-STARRS 1	PHO	920 m	MPC · JPL
715361	2015 UG_{82}	—	December 30, 2007	Kitt Peak	Spacewatch	·	890 m	MPC · JPL
715362	2015 UZ_{82}	—	February 28, 2014	Haleakala	Pan-STARRS 1	EUN	1.3 km	MPC · JPL
715363	2015 UO_{83}	—	November 2, 2006	Mount Lemmon	Mount Lemmon Survey	·	2.1 km	MPC · JPL
715364	2015 UV_{83}	—	November 1, 1999	Catalina	CSS	·	1.6 km	MPC · JPL
715365	2015 UB_{84}	—	November 13, 2006	Kitt Peak	Spacewatch	·	2.2 km	MPC · JPL
715366	2015 UK_{87}	—	October 19, 2015	Haleakala	Pan-STARRS 1	·	1.7 km	MPC · JPL
715367	2015 UN_{87}	—	July 28, 2014	Haleakala	Pan-STARRS 1	·	1.8 km	MPC · JPL
715368	2015 UY_{87}	—	February 25, 2011	Mount Lemmon	Mount Lemmon Survey	EOS	1.7 km	MPC · JPL
715369	2015 UX_{89}	—	August 26, 2014	Haleakala	Pan-STARRS 1	·	1.8 km	MPC · JPL
715370	2015 US_{90}	—	August 6, 2005	Palomar	NEAT	·	1.8 km	MPC · JPL
715371	2015 UV_{101}	—	October 18, 2015	Haleakala	Pan-STARRS 1	·	1.5 km	MPC · JPL
715372	2015 UD_{104}	—	October 18, 2015	Haleakala	Pan-STARRS 1	·	2.6 km	MPC · JPL
715373	2015 UJ_{105}	—	February 8, 2007	Kitt Peak	Spacewatch	·	450 m	MPC · JPL
715374	2015 UD_{106}	—	October 21, 2015	Haleakala	Pan-STARRS 1	ELF	2.4 km	MPC · JPL
715375	2015 UR_{108}	—	October 16, 2015	Haleakala	Pan-STARRS 1	·	570 m	MPC · JPL
715376	2015 UC_{112}	—	October 16, 2015	Mount Lemmon	Mount Lemmon Survey	·	450 m	MPC · JPL
715377	2015 VT_{4}	—	July 26, 2015	Haleakala	Pan-STARRS 1	·	2.5 km	MPC · JPL
715378	2015 VN_{5}	—	November 20, 2001	Socorro	LINEAR	·	1.9 km	MPC · JPL
715379	2015 VS_{6}	—	February 14, 2012	Haleakala	Pan-STARRS 1	·	1.8 km	MPC · JPL
715380	2015 VK_{7}	—	August 13, 2010	Kitt Peak	Spacewatch	·	1.6 km	MPC · JPL
715381	2015 VB_{8}	—	September 6, 2015	Haleakala	Pan-STARRS 1	·	790 m	MPC · JPL
715382	2015 VF_{8}	—	September 17, 2010	Mount Lemmon	Mount Lemmon Survey	·	1.4 km	MPC · JPL
715383	2015 VO_{9}	—	August 31, 2011	Haleakala	Pan-STARRS 1	·	1.1 km	MPC · JPL
715384	2015 VT_{9}	—	July 23, 2015	Haleakala	Pan-STARRS 1	·	820 m	MPC · JPL
715385	2015 VR_{13}	—	December 2, 2005	Kitt Peak	Spacewatch	·	1.9 km	MPC · JPL
715386	2015 VL_{18}	—	September 30, 2006	Mount Lemmon	Mount Lemmon Survey	·	1.4 km	MPC · JPL
715387	2015 VY_{18}	—	September 12, 2015	Haleakala	Pan-STARRS 1	·	1.6 km	MPC · JPL
715388	2015 VM_{19}	—	February 9, 2013	Haleakala	Pan-STARRS 1	·	1.1 km	MPC · JPL
715389	2015 VM_{20}	—	August 12, 2015	Haleakala	Pan-STARRS 1	MAR	850 m	MPC · JPL
715390	2015 VT_{21}	—	October 15, 2006	Kitt Peak	Spacewatch	·	1.5 km	MPC · JPL
715391	2015 VV_{21}	—	September 25, 2015	Mount Lemmon	Mount Lemmon Survey	HOF	2.0 km	MPC · JPL
715392	2015 VT_{22}	—	April 23, 2014	Cerro Tololo	DECam	·	730 m	MPC · JPL
715393	2015 VV_{22}	—	September 17, 2010	Mount Lemmon	Mount Lemmon Survey	·	1.4 km	MPC · JPL
715394	2015 VH_{25}	—	November 2, 2015	Haleakala	Pan-STARRS 1	·	2.9 km	MPC · JPL
715395	2015 VM_{26}	—	September 29, 2011	Mount Lemmon	Mount Lemmon Survey	·	1.3 km	MPC · JPL
715396	2015 VT_{28}	—	October 4, 2006	Mount Lemmon	Mount Lemmon Survey	MRX	980 m	MPC · JPL
715397	2015 VJ_{30}	—	December 14, 2010	Mount Lemmon	Mount Lemmon Survey	·	3.2 km	MPC · JPL
715398	2015 VO_{30}	—	October 13, 2010	Mount Lemmon	Mount Lemmon Survey	·	1.6 km	MPC · JPL
715399	2015 VP_{31}	—	November 11, 2010	Mount Lemmon	Mount Lemmon Survey	EOS	1.4 km	MPC · JPL
715400	2015 VF_{32}	—	September 17, 2010	Mount Lemmon	Mount Lemmon Survey	·	1.6 km	MPC · JPL

== 715401–715500 ==
back to top

Designation			Discovery			Properties		Ref
Permanent	Provisional	Named after	Date	Site	Discoverer(s)	Category	Diam.	Ref
715401	2015 VK_{32}	—	April 22, 2013	Mount Lemmon	Mount Lemmon Survey	·	1.6 km	MPC · JPL
715402	2015 VN_{32}	—	December 5, 2007	Kitt Peak	Spacewatch	(5)	930 m	MPC · JPL
715403	2015 VO_{32}	—	February 2, 2008	Kitt Peak	Spacewatch	·	1.9 km	MPC · JPL
715404	2015 VR_{33}	—	October 15, 2004	Kitt Peak	Spacewatch	·	2.8 km	MPC · JPL
715405	2015 VU_{33}	—	March 25, 2012	Mount Lemmon	Mount Lemmon Survey	EOS	1.6 km	MPC · JPL
715406	2015 VM_{35}	—	May 9, 2007	Mount Lemmon	Mount Lemmon Survey	VER	2.2 km	MPC · JPL
715407	2015 VZ_{37}	—	October 23, 2015	Mount Lemmon	Mount Lemmon Survey	·	1.8 km	MPC · JPL
715408	2015 VT_{38}	—	November 8, 2010	Kitt Peak	Spacewatch	·	2.1 km	MPC · JPL
715409	2015 VE_{41}	—	November 17, 2006	Kitt Peak	Spacewatch	·	1.8 km	MPC · JPL
715410	2015 VZ_{41}	—	August 24, 2003	Cerro Tololo	Deep Ecliptic Survey	·	2.4 km	MPC · JPL
715411	2015 VD_{42}	—	January 2, 2011	Mount Lemmon	Mount Lemmon Survey	VER	2.2 km	MPC · JPL
715412	2015 VX_{43}	—	July 23, 2015	Haleakala	Pan-STARRS 1	EUN	1.1 km	MPC · JPL
715413	2015 VC_{45}	—	October 15, 2001	Apache Point	SDSS Collaboration	·	1.5 km	MPC · JPL
715414	2015 VL_{45}	—	July 26, 2015	Haleakala	Pan-STARRS 1	·	1.4 km	MPC · JPL
715415	2015 VT_{45}	—	October 23, 2011	Kitt Peak	Spacewatch	·	1.6 km	MPC · JPL
715416	2015 VB_{47}	—	May 21, 2014	Haleakala	Pan-STARRS 1	·	1.7 km	MPC · JPL
715417	2015 VD_{47}	—	October 25, 2011	Haleakala	Pan-STARRS 1	·	1.6 km	MPC · JPL
715418	2015 VT_{49}	—	August 24, 2001	Haleakala	NEAT	·	1.9 km	MPC · JPL
715419	2015 VA_{50}	—	August 29, 2006	Kitt Peak	Spacewatch	NEM	1.8 km	MPC · JPL
715420	2015 VU_{51}	—	April 13, 2013	Haleakala	Pan-STARRS 1	EOS	1.6 km	MPC · JPL
715421	2015 VK_{52}	—	September 10, 2015	Haleakala	Pan-STARRS 1	·	1.1 km	MPC · JPL
715422	2015 VN_{55}	—	December 13, 2006	Mount Lemmon	Mount Lemmon Survey	·	1.5 km	MPC · JPL
715423	2015 VO_{57}	—	September 18, 2010	Mount Lemmon	Mount Lemmon Survey	·	1.6 km	MPC · JPL
715424	2015 VX_{58}	—	February 9, 2008	Mount Lemmon	Mount Lemmon Survey	·	1.7 km	MPC · JPL
715425	2015 VM_{60}	—	November 15, 2006	Kitt Peak	Spacewatch	·	1.8 km	MPC · JPL
715426	2015 VX_{60}	—	October 21, 2011	Mount Lemmon	Mount Lemmon Survey	·	1.5 km	MPC · JPL
715427	2015 VV_{62}	—	February 8, 2013	Haleakala	Pan-STARRS 1	·	1.5 km	MPC · JPL
715428	2015 VX_{66}	—	September 25, 1998	Kitt Peak	Spacewatch	·	600 m	MPC · JPL
715429	2015 VE_{68}	—	February 14, 2013	Kitt Peak	Spacewatch	EUN	1.0 km	MPC · JPL
715430	2015 VF_{74}	—	December 4, 2007	Kitt Peak	Spacewatch	·	1.2 km	MPC · JPL
715431	2015 VF_{76}	—	December 6, 2010	Mount Lemmon	Mount Lemmon Survey	·	2.5 km	MPC · JPL
715432	2015 VJ_{76}	—	October 30, 2010	Mount Lemmon	Mount Lemmon Survey	KOR	1.0 km	MPC · JPL
715433	2015 VW_{77}	—	October 10, 2015	Haleakala	Pan-STARRS 1	(31811)	2.2 km	MPC · JPL
715434	2015 VA_{78}	—	July 4, 2014	Haleakala	Pan-STARRS 1	·	1.7 km	MPC · JPL
715435	2015 VN_{79}	—	October 17, 2010	Mount Lemmon	Mount Lemmon Survey	·	1.4 km	MPC · JPL
715436	2015 VP_{79}	—	November 27, 2010	Mount Lemmon	Mount Lemmon Survey	·	2.1 km	MPC · JPL
715437	2015 VN_{80}	—	March 15, 2013	Mount Lemmon	Mount Lemmon Survey	·	1.6 km	MPC · JPL
715438	2015 VY_{80}	—	October 10, 2015	Haleakala	Pan-STARRS 1	·	1.5 km	MPC · JPL
715439	2015 VX_{81}	—	October 11, 1996	Kitt Peak	Spacewatch	·	1.7 km	MPC · JPL
715440	2015 VO_{83}	—	November 1, 2015	Haleakala	Pan-STARRS 1	·	1.8 km	MPC · JPL
715441	2015 VK_{84}	—	July 25, 2014	Haleakala	Pan-STARRS 1	3:2	5.0 km	MPC · JPL
715442	2015 VU_{84}	—	November 25, 2005	Kitt Peak	Spacewatch	·	1.9 km	MPC · JPL
715443	2015 VC_{85}	—	October 26, 2011	Haleakala	Pan-STARRS 1	·	1.3 km	MPC · JPL
715444	2015 VE_{86}	—	December 30, 2007	Kitt Peak	Spacewatch	·	1.4 km	MPC · JPL
715445	2015 VT_{89}	—	February 21, 2007	Kitt Peak	Spacewatch	·	510 m	MPC · JPL
715446	2015 VO_{90}	—	December 3, 2004	Kitt Peak	Spacewatch	·	1.2 km	MPC · JPL
715447	2015 VS_{92}	—	September 9, 2015	Haleakala	Pan-STARRS 1	·	1.4 km	MPC · JPL
715448	2015 VU_{93}	—	October 16, 2015	Kitt Peak	Spacewatch	HOF	2.1 km	MPC · JPL
715449	2015 VJ_{95}	—	September 12, 2015	Haleakala	Pan-STARRS 1	KOR	1.2 km	MPC · JPL
715450	2015 VE_{96}	—	November 2, 2015	Haleakala	Pan-STARRS 1	·	1.2 km	MPC · JPL
715451	2015 VK_{97}	—	November 7, 2015	Mount Lemmon	Mount Lemmon Survey	·	2.2 km	MPC · JPL
715452	2015 VJ_{101}	—	November 7, 2015	Haleakala	Pan-STARRS 1	·	1.5 km	MPC · JPL
715453	2015 VM_{101}	—	December 23, 2012	Haleakala	Pan-STARRS 1	·	520 m	MPC · JPL
715454	2015 VP_{103}	—	March 16, 2012	Mount Lemmon	Mount Lemmon Survey	·	2.5 km	MPC · JPL
715455	2015 VB_{108}	—	September 30, 2006	Mount Lemmon	Mount Lemmon Survey	·	1.5 km	MPC · JPL
715456	2015 VY_{108}	—	September 19, 2001	Socorro	LINEAR	·	1.9 km	MPC · JPL
715457	2015 VC_{110}	—	October 10, 1999	Kitt Peak	Spacewatch	EOS	1.6 km	MPC · JPL
715458	2015 VK_{114}	—	November 2, 2011	Mount Lemmon	Mount Lemmon Survey	RAF	840 m	MPC · JPL
715459	2015 VW_{116}	—	July 8, 2014	Haleakala	Pan-STARRS 1	·	3.3 km	MPC · JPL
715460	2015 VQ_{117}	—	September 9, 2015	Haleakala	Pan-STARRS 1	·	1.4 km	MPC · JPL
715461	2015 VG_{119}	—	October 10, 2015	Haleakala	Pan-STARRS 1	·	3.0 km	MPC · JPL
715462	2015 VS_{119}	—	November 13, 2002	Palomar	NEAT	·	660 m	MPC · JPL
715463	2015 VF_{120}	—	November 6, 2015	Piszkéstető	K. Sárneczky	·	610 m	MPC · JPL
715464	2015 VK_{120}	—	May 3, 2014	Haleakala	Pan-STARRS 1	PHO	1.0 km	MPC · JPL
715465	2015 VO_{126}	—	October 1, 2006	Kitt Peak	Spacewatch	·	1.4 km	MPC · JPL
715466	2015 VB_{127}	—	September 28, 2006	Kitt Peak	Spacewatch	·	1.7 km	MPC · JPL
715467	2015 VR_{131}	—	October 3, 2005	Catalina	CSS	·	2.1 km	MPC · JPL
715468	2015 VJ_{138}	—	October 9, 2008	Kitt Peak	Spacewatch	·	660 m	MPC · JPL
715469	2015 VN_{138}	—	November 15, 2006	Kitt Peak	Spacewatch	·	1.7 km	MPC · JPL
715470	2015 VQ_{138}	—	July 25, 2014	Haleakala	Pan-STARRS 1	·	1.9 km	MPC · JPL
715471	2015 VV_{138}	—	December 24, 2005	Kitt Peak	Spacewatch	·	1.4 km	MPC · JPL
715472	2015 VH_{139}	—	November 7, 2010	Mount Lemmon	Mount Lemmon Survey	·	2.5 km	MPC · JPL
715473	2015 VW_{141}	—	February 9, 2013	Haleakala	Pan-STARRS 1	(883)	680 m	MPC · JPL
715474	2015 VC_{144}	—	November 1, 2015	Mount Lemmon	Mount Lemmon Survey	·	2.4 km	MPC · JPL
715475	2015 VG_{146}	—	May 15, 2009	Kitt Peak	Spacewatch	·	2.4 km	MPC · JPL
715476	2015 VO_{151}	—	November 26, 2010	Mount Lemmon	Mount Lemmon Survey	·	1.8 km	MPC · JPL
715477	2015 VH_{155}	—	October 1, 2005	Kitt Peak	Spacewatch	·	1.4 km	MPC · JPL
715478	2015 VS_{155}	—	October 10, 2010	Mount Lemmon	Mount Lemmon Survey	·	1.3 km	MPC · JPL
715479	2015 VC_{156}	—	October 2, 2006	Mount Lemmon	Mount Lemmon Survey	·	1.5 km	MPC · JPL
715480	2015 VM_{156}	—	April 23, 2007	Catalina	CSS	·	3.1 km	MPC · JPL
715481	2015 VJ_{157}	—	November 30, 2005	Mount Lemmon	Mount Lemmon Survey	·	1.6 km	MPC · JPL
715482	2015 VQ_{157}	—	September 30, 2005	Mauna Kea	A. Boattini	THM	1.9 km	MPC · JPL
715483	2015 VP_{158}	—	January 27, 2011	Catalina	CSS	·	2.8 km	MPC · JPL
715484	2015 VS_{158}	—	November 1, 2015	Haleakala	Pan-STARRS 1	·	1.5 km	MPC · JPL
715485	2015 VV_{159}	—	August 27, 2006	Kitt Peak	Spacewatch	·	1.2 km	MPC · JPL
715486	2015 VB_{161}	—	December 13, 2010	Mount Lemmon	Mount Lemmon Survey	EOS	1.7 km	MPC · JPL
715487	2015 VC_{161}	—	November 7, 2015	Haleakala	Pan-STARRS 1	·	1.7 km	MPC · JPL
715488	2015 VS_{163}	—	November 14, 2015	Mount Lemmon	Mount Lemmon Survey	·	2.6 km	MPC · JPL
715489	2015 VY_{163}	—	August 12, 2015	Haleakala	Pan-STARRS 1	·	2.2 km	MPC · JPL
715490	2015 VZ_{163}	—	November 21, 2015	Mount Lemmon	Mount Lemmon Survey	·	1.6 km	MPC · JPL
715491	2015 VF_{174}	—	November 14, 2015	Mount Lemmon	Mount Lemmon Survey	·	2.2 km	MPC · JPL
715492	2015 VC_{187}	—	November 1, 2015	Mount Lemmon	Mount Lemmon Survey	·	1.8 km	MPC · JPL
715493	2015 VM_{189}	—	November 6, 2015	Haleakala	Pan-STARRS 1	·	1.8 km	MPC · JPL
715494	2015 VP_{189}	—	September 16, 2009	Kitt Peak	Spacewatch	·	2.3 km	MPC · JPL
715495	2015 VN_{191}	—	November 14, 2015	Mount Lemmon	Mount Lemmon Survey	·	2.8 km	MPC · JPL
715496	2015 VR_{191}	—	November 2, 2015	Mount Lemmon	Mount Lemmon Survey	EMA	2.1 km	MPC · JPL
715497	2015 VO_{195}	—	November 6, 2015	Mount Lemmon	Mount Lemmon Survey	EOS	1.4 km	MPC · JPL
715498	2015 VV_{196}	—	November 13, 2015	Mount Lemmon	Mount Lemmon Survey	·	2.0 km	MPC · JPL
715499	2015 VG_{199}	—	November 6, 2015	Mount Lemmon	Mount Lemmon Survey	·	1.6 km	MPC · JPL
715500	2015 VR_{199}	—	November 3, 2015	Mount Lemmon	Mount Lemmon Survey	·	1.3 km	MPC · JPL

== 715501–715600 ==
back to top

Designation			Discovery			Properties		Ref
Permanent	Provisional	Named after	Date	Site	Discoverer(s)	Category	Diam.	Ref
715501	2015 VT_{204}	—	November 7, 2015	Mount Lemmon	Mount Lemmon Survey	·	1.4 km	MPC · JPL
715502	2015 VO_{212}	—	November 25, 2010	Mount Lemmon	Mount Lemmon Survey	·	1.5 km	MPC · JPL
715503	2015 VV_{212}	—	November 9, 2015	Mount Lemmon	Mount Lemmon Survey	·	3.3 km	MPC · JPL
715504	2015 VA_{217}	—	November 3, 2015	Mount Lemmon	Mount Lemmon Survey	·	1.8 km	MPC · JPL
715505	2015 WV	—	December 2, 2005	Mount Lemmon	Mount Lemmon Survey	·	1.6 km	MPC · JPL
715506	2015 WZ_{2}	—	September 9, 2015	Haleakala	Pan-STARRS 1	BRA	1.3 km	MPC · JPL
715507	2015 WW_{4}	—	October 17, 2006	Mount Lemmon	Mount Lemmon Survey	·	1.3 km	MPC · JPL
715508	2015 WY_{4}	—	April 10, 2013	Mount Lemmon	Mount Lemmon Survey	·	1.7 km	MPC · JPL
715509	2015 WY_{5}	—	July 31, 2014	Haleakala	Pan-STARRS 1	NAE	2.1 km	MPC · JPL
715510	2015 WJ_{7}	—	February 1, 2006	Mount Lemmon	Mount Lemmon Survey	·	2.0 km	MPC · JPL
715511	2015 WS_{13}	—	August 15, 2009	Kitt Peak	Spacewatch	EOS	1.5 km	MPC · JPL
715512	2015 WG_{15}	—	October 5, 2004	Palomar	NEAT	·	2.0 km	MPC · JPL
715513	2015 WX_{15}	—	January 2, 2011	Charleston	R. Holmes	H	330 m	MPC · JPL
715514	2015 WA_{18}	—	November 1, 2010	Mount Lemmon	Mount Lemmon Survey	·	1.5 km	MPC · JPL
715515	2015 WP_{18}	—	October 1, 2014	Haleakala	Pan-STARRS 1	·	2.8 km	MPC · JPL
715516	2015 WF_{19}	—	June 7, 2013	Haleakala	Pan-STARRS 1	·	3.1 km	MPC · JPL
715517	2015 WL_{19}	—	November 22, 2015	Mount Lemmon	Mount Lemmon Survey	·	2.2 km	MPC · JPL
715518	2015 WF_{20}	—	December 13, 2010	Mount Lemmon	Mount Lemmon Survey	·	1.7 km	MPC · JPL
715519	2015 WP_{20}	—	November 19, 2015	Kitt Peak	Spacewatch	·	2.0 km	MPC · JPL
715520	2015 WP_{21}	—	August 28, 2014	Haleakala	Pan-STARRS 1	·	2.8 km	MPC · JPL
715521	2015 WZ_{21}	—	November 22, 2015	Mount Lemmon	Mount Lemmon Survey	(5)	1.3 km	MPC · JPL
715522	2015 WM_{22}	—	November 20, 2015	Kitt Peak	Spacewatch	DOR	1.9 km	MPC · JPL
715523	2015 WW_{29}	—	November 22, 2015	Mount Lemmon	Mount Lemmon Survey	·	1.2 km	MPC · JPL
715524	2015 WA_{30}	—	November 22, 2015	Mount Lemmon	Mount Lemmon Survey	·	2.1 km	MPC · JPL
715525	2015 WB_{32}	—	November 18, 2015	Haleakala	Pan-STARRS 1	·	2.9 km	MPC · JPL
715526	2015 WF_{32}	—	November 21, 2015	Mount Lemmon	Mount Lemmon Survey	EOS	1.3 km	MPC · JPL
715527	2015 WL_{32}	—	November 21, 2015	Mount Lemmon	Mount Lemmon Survey	EOS	1.4 km	MPC · JPL
715528	2015 WM_{33}	—	November 22, 2015	Mount Lemmon	Mount Lemmon Survey	EOS	1.2 km	MPC · JPL
715529	2015 WF_{36}	—	November 22, 2015	Mount Lemmon	Mount Lemmon Survey	·	440 m	MPC · JPL
715530	2015 XH_{6}	—	July 4, 2014	Haleakala	Pan-STARRS 1	·	2.6 km	MPC · JPL
715531	2015 XW_{7}	—	June 27, 2014	Haleakala	Pan-STARRS 1	EOS	1.6 km	MPC · JPL
715532	2015 XD_{9}	—	December 2, 2010	Mount Lemmon	Mount Lemmon Survey	·	1.7 km	MPC · JPL
715533	2015 XU_{9}	—	November 11, 2006	Mount Lemmon	Mount Lemmon Survey	·	1.4 km	MPC · JPL
715534	2015 XL_{11}	—	September 24, 2006	Kitt Peak	Spacewatch	·	2.0 km	MPC · JPL
715535	2015 XF_{12}	—	December 2, 2015	Haleakala	Pan-STARRS 1	·	1.7 km	MPC · JPL
715536	2015 XB_{14}	—	August 23, 2014	Haleakala	Pan-STARRS 1	·	1.9 km	MPC · JPL
715537	2015 XW_{14}	—	September 9, 2015	Haleakala	Pan-STARRS 1	·	2.4 km	MPC · JPL
715538	2015 XD_{17}	—	November 7, 2015	Mount Lemmon	Mount Lemmon Survey	·	1.4 km	MPC · JPL
715539	2015 XW_{17}	—	October 8, 2015	Haleakala	Pan-STARRS 1	·	2.3 km	MPC · JPL
715540	2015 XZ_{17}	—	January 9, 2006	Kitt Peak	Spacewatch	·	2.0 km	MPC · JPL
715541	2015 XN_{19}	—	September 10, 2010	La Sagra	OAM	·	1.5 km	MPC · JPL
715542 Tafforin	2015 XR_{20}	Tafforin	October 15, 2015	Oukaïmeden	M. Ory	·	2.0 km	MPC · JPL
715543	2015 XE_{21}	—	November 18, 2015	Haleakala	Pan-STARRS 1	·	1.3 km	MPC · JPL
715544	2015 XL_{25}	—	December 3, 2010	Mount Lemmon	Mount Lemmon Survey	EOS	1.7 km	MPC · JPL
715545	2015 XQ_{25}	—	July 30, 2014	Haleakala	Pan-STARRS 1	EMA	2.9 km	MPC · JPL
715546	2015 XJ_{30}	—	December 2, 2015	Haleakala	Pan-STARRS 1	·	510 m	MPC · JPL
715547	2015 XG_{31}	—	November 18, 2015	Kitt Peak	Spacewatch	·	1.2 km	MPC · JPL
715548	2015 XV_{31}	—	January 4, 2006	Kitt Peak	Spacewatch	·	1.9 km	MPC · JPL
715549	2015 XG_{32}	—	October 8, 2015	Haleakala	Pan-STARRS 1	EOS	1.5 km	MPC · JPL
715550	2015 XU_{36}	—	February 9, 2008	Kitt Peak	Spacewatch	·	1.3 km	MPC · JPL
715551	2015 XY_{36}	—	November 6, 2010	Mount Lemmon	Mount Lemmon Survey	EOS	1.6 km	MPC · JPL
715552	2015 XO_{37}	—	May 16, 2007	Mount Lemmon	Mount Lemmon Survey	·	2.2 km	MPC · JPL
715553	2015 XN_{38}	—	August 28, 2014	Haleakala	Pan-STARRS 1	·	1.8 km	MPC · JPL
715554	2015 XM_{39}	—	October 8, 2015	Haleakala	Pan-STARRS 1	·	2.0 km	MPC · JPL
715555	2015 XB_{41}	—	February 10, 2011	Mount Lemmon	Mount Lemmon Survey	HYG	2.1 km	MPC · JPL
715556	2015 XS_{43}	—	July 8, 2014	Haleakala	Pan-STARRS 1	HOF	1.9 km	MPC · JPL
715557	2015 XE_{44}	—	December 2, 2015	Haleakala	Pan-STARRS 1	·	2.8 km	MPC · JPL
715558	2015 XR_{44}	—	August 27, 2009	Kitt Peak	Spacewatch	·	1.8 km	MPC · JPL
715559	2015 XZ_{44}	—	February 15, 2012	Haleakala	Pan-STARRS 1	·	1.2 km	MPC · JPL
715560	2015 XE_{45}	—	September 29, 2009	Mount Lemmon	Mount Lemmon Survey	VER	2.2 km	MPC · JPL
715561	2015 XN_{45}	—	March 25, 2012	Mount Lemmon	Mount Lemmon Survey	·	2.7 km	MPC · JPL
715562	2015 XP_{48}	—	February 20, 2012	Haleakala	Pan-STARRS 1	·	2.2 km	MPC · JPL
715563	2015 XU_{48}	—	February 24, 2006	Kitt Peak	Spacewatch	·	2.5 km	MPC · JPL
715564	2015 XR_{50}	—	October 8, 2007	Mount Lemmon	Mount Lemmon Survey	3:2 · SHU	4.2 km	MPC · JPL
715565	2015 XF_{51}	—	June 4, 2013	Mount Lemmon	Mount Lemmon Survey	·	2.9 km	MPC · JPL
715566	2015 XF_{52}	—	September 26, 2009	Kitt Peak	Spacewatch	·	2.8 km	MPC · JPL
715567	2015 XV_{56}	—	October 8, 2015	Haleakala	Pan-STARRS 1	·	1.4 km	MPC · JPL
715568	2015 XC_{58}	—	February 20, 2012	Haleakala	Pan-STARRS 1	·	2.2 km	MPC · JPL
715569	2015 XY_{58}	—	November 20, 2008	Kitt Peak	Spacewatch	·	590 m	MPC · JPL
715570	2015 XS_{59}	—	December 1, 2015	Haleakala	Pan-STARRS 1	EOS	1.5 km	MPC · JPL
715571	2015 XE_{60}	—	March 30, 2012	Kitt Peak	Spacewatch	ELF	2.5 km	MPC · JPL
715572	2015 XB_{61}	—	August 28, 2014	Haleakala	Pan-STARRS 1	·	2.2 km	MPC · JPL
715573	2015 XY_{61}	—	August 29, 2009	Kitt Peak	Spacewatch	·	1.8 km	MPC · JPL
715574	2015 XA_{62}	—	April 19, 2013	Haleakala	Pan-STARRS 1	NAE	2.1 km	MPC · JPL
715575	2015 XB_{69}	—	July 30, 2014	Haleakala	Pan-STARRS 1	DOR	2.1 km	MPC · JPL
715576	2015 XU_{71}	—	May 1, 2009	Kitt Peak	Spacewatch	·	1.7 km	MPC · JPL
715577	2015 XZ_{72}	—	November 19, 2015	Mount Lemmon	Mount Lemmon Survey	·	1.9 km	MPC · JPL
715578	2015 XD_{74}	—	January 22, 2012	Haleakala	Pan-STARRS 1	·	2.6 km	MPC · JPL
715579	2015 XQ_{74}	—	March 17, 2012	Mount Lemmon	Mount Lemmon Survey	·	2.7 km	MPC · JPL
715580	2015 XC_{75}	—	October 10, 2015	Haleakala	Pan-STARRS 1	·	1.8 km	MPC · JPL
715581	2015 XY_{76}	—	October 8, 2015	Haleakala	Pan-STARRS 1	·	1.7 km	MPC · JPL
715582	2015 XZ_{76}	—	May 15, 2013	Haleakala	Pan-STARRS 1	·	2.0 km	MPC · JPL
715583	2015 XD_{78}	—	July 29, 2014	Haleakala	Pan-STARRS 1	·	1.6 km	MPC · JPL
715584	2015 XG_{78}	—	May 29, 2008	Kitt Peak	Spacewatch	·	1.5 km	MPC · JPL
715585	2015 XH_{78}	—	December 3, 2015	Haleakala	Pan-STARRS 1	EOS	1.3 km	MPC · JPL
715586	2015 XD_{80}	—	September 14, 2009	Kitt Peak	Spacewatch	·	2.1 km	MPC · JPL
715587	2015 XF_{81}	—	January 29, 2011	Mount Lemmon	Mount Lemmon Survey	URS	2.4 km	MPC · JPL
715588	2015 XH_{83}	—	December 11, 2010	Mount Lemmon	Mount Lemmon Survey	·	2.3 km	MPC · JPL
715589	2015 XZ_{84}	—	January 30, 2011	Mount Lemmon	Mount Lemmon Survey	·	2.4 km	MPC · JPL
715590	2015 XB_{85}	—	January 20, 2012	Mount Lemmon	Mount Lemmon Survey	·	1.9 km	MPC · JPL
715591	2015 XK_{86}	—	December 3, 2004	Kitt Peak	Spacewatch	·	2.6 km	MPC · JPL
715592	2015 XN_{86}	—	February 14, 2005	Catalina	CSS	(895)	4.3 km	MPC · JPL
715593	2015 XZ_{86}	—	July 15, 2013	Haleakala	Pan-STARRS 1	·	3.2 km	MPC · JPL
715594	2015 XZ_{87}	—	October 5, 2004	Kitt Peak	Spacewatch	·	1.6 km	MPC · JPL
715595	2015 XJ_{91}	—	October 22, 2009	Mount Lemmon	Mount Lemmon Survey	LUT	3.3 km	MPC · JPL
715596	2015 XK_{91}	—	May 28, 2008	Mount Lemmon	Mount Lemmon Survey	·	1.8 km	MPC · JPL
715597	2015 XZ_{92}	—	November 2, 2010	Mount Lemmon	Mount Lemmon Survey	·	1.4 km	MPC · JPL
715598	2015 XS_{93}	—	February 23, 2012	Kitt Peak	Spacewatch	·	2.7 km	MPC · JPL
715599	2015 XZ_{93}	—	November 13, 2015	Mount Lemmon	Mount Lemmon Survey	·	1.3 km	MPC · JPL
715600	2015 XX_{95}	—	November 13, 2015	Mount Lemmon	Mount Lemmon Survey	EOS	1.4 km	MPC · JPL

== 715601–715700 ==
back to top

Designation			Discovery			Properties		Ref
Permanent	Provisional	Named after	Date	Site	Discoverer(s)	Category	Diam.	Ref
715601	2015 XP_{98}	—	April 27, 2012	Haleakala	Pan-STARRS 1	·	2.2 km	MPC · JPL
715602	2015 XW_{98}	—	June 21, 2014	Mount Lemmon	Mount Lemmon Survey	·	1.3 km	MPC · JPL
715603	2015 XC_{99}	—	March 19, 2013	Haleakala	Pan-STARRS 1	·	1.4 km	MPC · JPL
715604	2015 XL_{100}	—	December 14, 2010	Mount Lemmon	Mount Lemmon Survey	·	1.2 km	MPC · JPL
715605	2015 XC_{101}	—	July 30, 2014	Haleakala	Pan-STARRS 1	·	1.6 km	MPC · JPL
715606	2015 XO_{101}	—	September 17, 2009	Kitt Peak	Spacewatch	·	2.1 km	MPC · JPL
715607	2015 XP_{101}	—	December 4, 2015	Haleakala	Pan-STARRS 1	·	1.4 km	MPC · JPL
715608	2015 XH_{102}	—	December 4, 2015	Haleakala	Pan-STARRS 1	·	1.9 km	MPC · JPL
715609	2015 XO_{104}	—	December 4, 2015	Haleakala	Pan-STARRS 1	EOS	1.6 km	MPC · JPL
715610	2015 XK_{107}	—	December 4, 2015	Haleakala	Pan-STARRS 1	·	1.6 km	MPC · JPL
715611	2015 XQ_{107}	—	April 20, 2012	Mount Lemmon	Mount Lemmon Survey	·	2.4 km	MPC · JPL
715612	2015 XH_{108}	—	December 25, 2005	Mount Lemmon	Mount Lemmon Survey	EOS	1.5 km	MPC · JPL
715613	2015 XN_{108}	—	November 18, 2015	Kitt Peak	Spacewatch	·	1.5 km	MPC · JPL
715614	2015 XS_{108}	—	December 4, 2015	Haleakala	Pan-STARRS 1	·	1.7 km	MPC · JPL
715615	2015 XW_{108}	—	March 24, 2012	Kitt Peak	Spacewatch	·	2.4 km	MPC · JPL
715616	2015 XJ_{109}	—	July 4, 2014	Haleakala	Pan-STARRS 1	·	2.1 km	MPC · JPL
715617	2015 XX_{109}	—	April 19, 2013	Haleakala	Pan-STARRS 1	·	2.2 km	MPC · JPL
715618	2015 XG_{110}	—	February 29, 2012	Kitt Peak	Spacewatch	·	1.5 km	MPC · JPL
715619	2015 XL_{110}	—	May 15, 2013	Haleakala	Pan-STARRS 1	·	2.6 km	MPC · JPL
715620	2015 XM_{111}	—	April 17, 2013	Haleakala	Pan-STARRS 1	·	1.8 km	MPC · JPL
715621	2015 XV_{112}	—	November 13, 2015	Mount Lemmon	Mount Lemmon Survey	ELF	2.8 km	MPC · JPL
715622	2015 XC_{113}	—	January 19, 2012	Kitt Peak	Spacewatch	HOF	2.1 km	MPC · JPL
715623	2015 XD_{115}	—	December 4, 2015	Haleakala	Pan-STARRS 1	·	2.3 km	MPC · JPL
715624	2015 XQ_{116}	—	March 25, 2007	Mount Lemmon	Mount Lemmon Survey	·	1.9 km	MPC · JPL
715625	2015 XT_{116}	—	January 2, 2011	Mount Lemmon	Mount Lemmon Survey	·	2.4 km	MPC · JPL
715626	2015 XO_{117}	—	December 4, 2015	Haleakala	Pan-STARRS 1	·	910 m	MPC · JPL
715627	2015 XG_{121}	—	December 4, 2015	Haleakala	Pan-STARRS 1	EOS	1.3 km	MPC · JPL
715628	2015 XB_{122}	—	September 20, 2009	Kitt Peak	Spacewatch	·	1.8 km	MPC · JPL
715629	2015 XK_{123}	—	February 27, 2012	Haleakala	Pan-STARRS 1	·	1.8 km	MPC · JPL
715630	2015 XX_{123}	—	April 25, 2007	Mount Lemmon	Mount Lemmon Survey	·	2.5 km	MPC · JPL
715631	2015 XO_{126}	—	October 9, 2015	Haleakala	Pan-STARRS 1	URS	2.7 km	MPC · JPL
715632	2015 XW_{130}	—	January 5, 2011	Mount Lemmon	Mount Lemmon Survey	·	1.8 km	MPC · JPL
715633	2015 XX_{134}	—	December 25, 2005	Kitt Peak	Spacewatch	·	1.4 km	MPC · JPL
715634	2015 XK_{140}	—	February 1, 2006	Mount Lemmon	Mount Lemmon Survey	·	1.6 km	MPC · JPL
715635	2015 XQ_{141}	—	October 24, 2015	Mount Lemmon	Mount Lemmon Survey	·	2.8 km	MPC · JPL
715636	2015 XX_{141}	—	October 22, 2009	Mount Lemmon	Mount Lemmon Survey	·	2.7 km	MPC · JPL
715637	2015 XG_{142}	—	December 4, 2015	Mount Lemmon	Mount Lemmon Survey	V	450 m	MPC · JPL
715638	2015 XW_{142}	—	September 30, 2010	Mount Lemmon	Mount Lemmon Survey	·	1.4 km	MPC · JPL
715639	2015 XJ_{143}	—	December 10, 2010	Mount Lemmon	Mount Lemmon Survey	·	2.2 km	MPC · JPL
715640	2015 XB_{144}	—	December 4, 2015	Mount Lemmon	Mount Lemmon Survey	·	1.7 km	MPC · JPL
715641	2015 XJ_{144}	—	November 22, 2015	Mount Lemmon	Mount Lemmon Survey	·	1.7 km	MPC · JPL
715642	2015 XD_{145}	—	April 15, 2008	Kitt Peak	Spacewatch	·	2.2 km	MPC · JPL
715643	2015 XE_{147}	—	December 4, 2015	Mount Lemmon	Mount Lemmon Survey	·	2.7 km	MPC · JPL
715644	2015 XR_{150}	—	July 25, 2014	Haleakala	Pan-STARRS 1	·	2.4 km	MPC · JPL
715645	2015 XR_{152}	—	August 28, 2009	Kitt Peak	Spacewatch	EOS	1.3 km	MPC · JPL
715646	2015 XP_{153}	—	September 2, 2014	Haleakala	Pan-STARRS 1	EOS	1.8 km	MPC · JPL
715647	2015 XX_{156}	—	September 16, 2010	Mount Lemmon	Mount Lemmon Survey	JUN	960 m	MPC · JPL
715648	2015 XC_{157}	—	December 5, 2015	Haleakala	Pan-STARRS 1	·	2.9 km	MPC · JPL
715649	2015 XO_{158}	—	July 24, 1995	Kitt Peak	Spacewatch	·	2.0 km	MPC · JPL
715650	2015 XR_{158}	—	January 20, 2012	Haleakala	Pan-STARRS 1	ARM	3.3 km	MPC · JPL
715651	2015 XE_{159}	—	February 27, 2007	Kitt Peak	Spacewatch	·	2.9 km	MPC · JPL
715652	2015 XC_{162}	—	May 4, 2014	Haleakala	Pan-STARRS 1	ADE	1.7 km	MPC · JPL
715653	2015 XF_{162}	—	October 13, 2015	Haleakala	Pan-STARRS 1	·	2.2 km	MPC · JPL
715654	2015 XL_{162}	—	December 5, 2015	Haleakala	Pan-STARRS 1	·	2.8 km	MPC · JPL
715655	2015 XW_{162}	—	August 21, 2015	Haleakala	Pan-STARRS 1	EOS	1.5 km	MPC · JPL
715656	2015 XD_{165}	—	September 12, 2015	Haleakala	Pan-STARRS 1	·	1.6 km	MPC · JPL
715657	2015 XH_{165}	—	October 13, 2015	Haleakala	Pan-STARRS 1	·	2.0 km	MPC · JPL
715658	2015 XE_{166}	—	October 2, 2010	Mount Lemmon	Mount Lemmon Survey	HOF	2.5 km	MPC · JPL
715659	2015 XE_{168}	—	May 27, 2012	Mount Lemmon	Mount Lemmon Survey	·	2.3 km	MPC · JPL
715660	2015 XR_{168}	—	January 1, 2009	Siding Spring	SSS	·	1.5 km	MPC · JPL
715661	2015 XC_{171}	—	June 12, 2013	Haleakala	Pan-STARRS 1	·	2.5 km	MPC · JPL
715662	2015 XO_{173}	—	April 30, 2006	Kitt Peak	Spacewatch	PHO	710 m	MPC · JPL
715663	2015 XU_{175}	—	August 28, 2014	Haleakala	Pan-STARRS 1	EOS	1.4 km	MPC · JPL
715664	2015 XQ_{176}	—	December 5, 2015	Haleakala	Pan-STARRS 1	·	2.2 km	MPC · JPL
715665	2015 XR_{176}	—	July 25, 2014	Haleakala	Pan-STARRS 1	HOF	2.0 km	MPC · JPL
715666	2015 XC_{177}	—	December 5, 2015	Haleakala	Pan-STARRS 1	EOS	1.2 km	MPC · JPL
715667	2015 XN_{178}	—	May 31, 2003	Cerro Tololo	Deep Ecliptic Survey	·	1.8 km	MPC · JPL
715668	2015 XE_{179}	—	August 25, 2014	Haleakala	Pan-STARRS 1	·	2.4 km	MPC · JPL
715669	2015 XG_{179}	—	December 5, 2015	Haleakala	Pan-STARRS 1	·	1.0 km	MPC · JPL
715670	2015 XF_{180}	—	December 5, 2015	Haleakala	Pan-STARRS 1	·	470 m	MPC · JPL
715671	2015 XT_{180}	—	July 24, 2015	Haleakala	Pan-STARRS 1	(5)	1.1 km	MPC · JPL
715672	2015 XO_{181}	—	January 16, 2013	Haleakala	Pan-STARRS 1	·	480 m	MPC · JPL
715673	2015 XS_{181}	—	March 16, 2012	Haleakala	Pan-STARRS 1	EOS	1.4 km	MPC · JPL
715674	2015 XC_{183}	—	December 5, 2015	Haleakala	Pan-STARRS 1	·	2.7 km	MPC · JPL
715675	2015 XJ_{184}	—	May 15, 2013	Haleakala	Pan-STARRS 1	·	2.0 km	MPC · JPL
715676	2015 XU_{184}	—	October 23, 2003	Apache Point	SDSS Collaboration	·	2.3 km	MPC · JPL
715677	2015 XK_{187}	—	March 29, 2012	Haleakala	Pan-STARRS 1	·	2.1 km	MPC · JPL
715678	2015 XS_{189}	—	December 6, 2015	Haleakala	Pan-STARRS 1	H	500 m	MPC · JPL
715679	2015 XA_{192}	—	August 26, 2014	Haleakala	Pan-STARRS 1	·	2.6 km	MPC · JPL
715680	2015 XE_{192}	—	December 16, 1999	Kitt Peak	Spacewatch	·	1.8 km	MPC · JPL
715681	2015 XP_{192}	—	November 9, 2008	Mount Lemmon	Mount Lemmon Survey	·	570 m	MPC · JPL
715682	2015 XB_{193}	—	October 16, 2009	Mount Lemmon	Mount Lemmon Survey	·	2.0 km	MPC · JPL
715683	2015 XW_{193}	—	December 27, 2005	Kitt Peak	Spacewatch	EOS	1.9 km	MPC · JPL
715684	2015 XD_{195}	—	December 6, 2015	Mount Lemmon	Mount Lemmon Survey	EOS	2.1 km	MPC · JPL
715685	2015 XW_{195}	—	December 6, 2015	Mount Lemmon	Mount Lemmon Survey	·	2.4 km	MPC · JPL
715686	2015 XB_{200}	—	March 14, 2007	Mount Lemmon	Mount Lemmon Survey	·	2.1 km	MPC · JPL
715687	2015 XE_{200}	—	January 14, 2011	Mount Lemmon	Mount Lemmon Survey	·	1.8 km	MPC · JPL
715688	2015 XY_{202}	—	September 26, 2009	Kitt Peak	Spacewatch	·	1.9 km	MPC · JPL
715689	2015 XY_{204}	—	March 4, 2012	Mount Lemmon	Mount Lemmon Survey	·	1.9 km	MPC · JPL
715690	2015 XP_{206}	—	June 3, 2014	Haleakala	Pan-STARRS 1	EOS	1.6 km	MPC · JPL
715691	2015 XP_{207}	—	June 3, 2014	Haleakala	Pan-STARRS 1	·	2.0 km	MPC · JPL
715692	2015 XB_{209}	—	June 3, 2013	Mount Lemmon	Mount Lemmon Survey	·	2.7 km	MPC · JPL
715693	2015 XT_{212}	—	August 25, 2014	Haleakala	Pan-STARRS 1	EOS	1.5 km	MPC · JPL
715694	2015 XH_{213}	—	December 3, 2015	Mount Lemmon	Mount Lemmon Survey	·	2.5 km	MPC · JPL
715695	2015 XX_{213}	—	August 21, 2014	Haleakala	Pan-STARRS 1	·	1.3 km	MPC · JPL
715696	2015 XL_{215}	—	September 2, 2014	Haleakala	Pan-STARRS 1	·	2.1 km	MPC · JPL
715697	2015 XM_{217}	—	August 22, 2014	Haleakala	Pan-STARRS 1	·	2.8 km	MPC · JPL
715698	2015 XY_{217}	—	May 26, 2007	Mount Lemmon	Mount Lemmon Survey	·	510 m	MPC · JPL
715699	2015 XY_{221}	—	January 29, 2012	Mount Lemmon	Mount Lemmon Survey	PAD	1.3 km	MPC · JPL
715700	2015 XV_{222}	—	November 22, 2015	Mount Lemmon	Mount Lemmon Survey	·	2.5 km	MPC · JPL

== 715701–715800 ==
back to top

Designation			Discovery			Properties		Ref
Permanent	Provisional	Named after	Date	Site	Discoverer(s)	Category	Diam.	Ref
715701	2015 XK_{223}	—	December 14, 2010	Mount Lemmon	Mount Lemmon Survey	·	1.5 km	MPC · JPL
715702	2015 XZ_{223}	—	August 28, 2014	Haleakala	Pan-STARRS 1	·	1.3 km	MPC · JPL
715703	2015 XW_{225}	—	July 30, 2014	Haleakala	Pan-STARRS 1	·	1.4 km	MPC · JPL
715704	2015 XZ_{225}	—	August 28, 2014	Haleakala	Pan-STARRS 1	EUN	1.3 km	MPC · JPL
715705	2015 XN_{226}	—	June 24, 2014	Haleakala	Pan-STARRS 1	·	2.6 km	MPC · JPL
715706	2015 XJ_{227}	—	July 7, 2014	Haleakala	Pan-STARRS 1	·	1.3 km	MPC · JPL
715707	2015 XK_{227}	—	December 16, 2007	Mount Lemmon	Mount Lemmon Survey	·	1.3 km	MPC · JPL
715708	2015 XY_{227}	—	December 6, 2015	Haleakala	Pan-STARRS 1	·	1.6 km	MPC · JPL
715709	2015 XN_{228}	—	May 18, 2002	Palomar	NEAT	·	2.1 km	MPC · JPL
715710	2015 XL_{230}	—	March 16, 2012	Mount Lemmon	Mount Lemmon Survey	·	2.3 km	MPC · JPL
715711	2015 XT_{230}	—	December 6, 2015	Haleakala	Pan-STARRS 1	·	1.5 km	MPC · JPL
715712	2015 XD_{232}	—	March 14, 2012	Mount Lemmon	Mount Lemmon Survey	·	2.2 km	MPC · JPL
715713	2015 XQ_{238}	—	December 6, 2015	Haleakala	Pan-STARRS 1	·	350 m	MPC · JPL
715714	2015 XL_{240}	—	November 14, 2010	Mount Lemmon	Mount Lemmon Survey	·	1.9 km	MPC · JPL
715715	2015 XA_{242}	—	July 28, 2014	Haleakala	Pan-STARRS 1	·	1.1 km	MPC · JPL
715716	2015 XR_{242}	—	August 3, 2014	Haleakala	Pan-STARRS 1	·	1.5 km	MPC · JPL
715717	2015 XK_{243}	—	November 30, 2005	Kitt Peak	Spacewatch	·	1.5 km	MPC · JPL
715718	2015 XY_{244}	—	September 19, 2014	Haleakala	Pan-STARRS 1	·	2.2 km	MPC · JPL
715719	2015 XM_{245}	—	October 1, 2014	Haleakala	Pan-STARRS 1	·	2.1 km	MPC · JPL
715720	2015 XZ_{245}	—	September 17, 2014	Haleakala	Pan-STARRS 1	TIR	3.0 km	MPC · JPL
715721	2015 XH_{246}	—	June 30, 2005	Kitt Peak	Spacewatch	BRA	1.5 km	MPC · JPL
715722	2015 XD_{247}	—	February 4, 2012	Haleakala	Pan-STARRS 1	·	1.4 km	MPC · JPL
715723	2015 XG_{247}	—	August 12, 2015	Haleakala	Pan-STARRS 1	·	2.7 km	MPC · JPL
715724	2015 XH_{247}	—	August 20, 2014	Haleakala	Pan-STARRS 1	·	1.5 km	MPC · JPL
715725	2015 XQ_{249}	—	December 7, 2015	Haleakala	Pan-STARRS 1	URS	2.2 km	MPC · JPL
715726	2015 XM_{250}	—	October 10, 2015	Haleakala	Pan-STARRS 1	·	2.2 km	MPC · JPL
715727	2015 XP_{251}	—	February 14, 2013	Haleakala	Pan-STARRS 1	MAR	1.1 km	MPC · JPL
715728	2015 XE_{252}	—	October 10, 2015	Haleakala	Pan-STARRS 1	·	2.0 km	MPC · JPL
715729	2015 XK_{253}	—	July 25, 2014	Haleakala	Pan-STARRS 1	·	2.5 km	MPC · JPL
715730	2015 XA_{255}	—	November 7, 2010	Mount Lemmon	Mount Lemmon Survey	T_{j} (2.98)	3.0 km	MPC · JPL
715731	2015 XJ_{256}	—	December 13, 2010	Kitt Peak	Spacewatch	·	2.7 km	MPC · JPL
715732	2015 XF_{257}	—	September 20, 2006	Kitt Peak	Spacewatch	(5)	1.3 km	MPC · JPL
715733	2015 XP_{258}	—	December 4, 2015	Mount Lemmon	Mount Lemmon Survey	·	790 m	MPC · JPL
715734	2015 XP_{263}	—	December 6, 2015	Haleakala	Pan-STARRS 1	·	2.0 km	MPC · JPL
715735	2015 XK_{265}	—	November 22, 2015	Mount Lemmon	Mount Lemmon Survey	·	2.3 km	MPC · JPL
715736	2015 XN_{265}	—	October 24, 2015	Mount Lemmon	Mount Lemmon Survey	·	2.3 km	MPC · JPL
715737	2015 XA_{267}	—	July 2, 2011	Mount Lemmon	Mount Lemmon Survey	·	520 m	MPC · JPL
715738	2015 XK_{269}	—	May 1, 2013	Mount Lemmon	Mount Lemmon Survey	·	1.5 km	MPC · JPL
715739	2015 XM_{270}	—	November 22, 2015	Mount Lemmon	Mount Lemmon Survey	TIR	2.5 km	MPC · JPL
715740	2015 XZ_{273}	—	October 23, 2009	Mount Lemmon	Mount Lemmon Survey	VER	2.4 km	MPC · JPL
715741	2015 XF_{274}	—	December 6, 2015	Haleakala	Pan-STARRS 1	·	2.1 km	MPC · JPL
715742	2015 XK_{274}	—	April 16, 2012	Haleakala	Pan-STARRS 1	·	2.5 km	MPC · JPL
715743	2015 XQ_{274}	—	December 6, 2015	Mount Lemmon	Mount Lemmon Survey	EOS	1.6 km	MPC · JPL
715744	2015 XK_{276}	—	June 27, 2014	Haleakala	Pan-STARRS 1	HOF	1.9 km	MPC · JPL
715745	2015 XQ_{277}	—	April 17, 2013	Haleakala	Pan-STARRS 1	·	1.7 km	MPC · JPL
715746	2015 XB_{281}	—	June 4, 2014	Haleakala	Pan-STARRS 1	·	1.9 km	MPC · JPL
715747	2015 XR_{281}	—	December 7, 2015	Haleakala	Pan-STARRS 1	AGN	1 km	MPC · JPL
715748	2015 XF_{282}	—	August 25, 2014	Haleakala	Pan-STARRS 1	EOS	1.9 km	MPC · JPL
715749	2015 XK_{284}	—	March 14, 2012	Mount Lemmon	Mount Lemmon Survey	·	1.8 km	MPC · JPL
715750	2015 XC_{285}	—	March 8, 2008	Kitt Peak	Spacewatch	·	1.2 km	MPC · JPL
715751	2015 XB_{288}	—	August 28, 2014	Haleakala	Pan-STARRS 1	·	1.6 km	MPC · JPL
715752	2015 XD_{290}	—	April 6, 2008	Kitt Peak	Spacewatch	MRX	770 m	MPC · JPL
715753	2015 XF_{291}	—	December 7, 2015	Haleakala	Pan-STARRS 1	·	1.7 km	MPC · JPL
715754	2015 XM_{292}	—	April 5, 2008	Mount Lemmon	Mount Lemmon Survey	·	1.5 km	MPC · JPL
715755	2015 XX_{292}	—	August 18, 2014	Haleakala	Pan-STARRS 1	·	2.0 km	MPC · JPL
715756	2015 XZ_{293}	—	October 12, 2010	Mount Lemmon	Mount Lemmon Survey	·	1.6 km	MPC · JPL
715757	2015 XO_{294}	—	December 7, 2015	Haleakala	Pan-STARRS 1	·	2.8 km	MPC · JPL
715758	2015 XB_{295}	—	December 7, 2015	Haleakala	Pan-STARRS 1	·	2.0 km	MPC · JPL
715759	2015 XV_{296}	—	October 1, 2009	Mount Lemmon	Mount Lemmon Survey	·	2.7 km	MPC · JPL
715760	2015 XB_{298}	—	December 7, 2015	Haleakala	Pan-STARRS 1	·	500 m	MPC · JPL
715761	2015 XQ_{299}	—	December 4, 2015	Mount Lemmon	Mount Lemmon Survey	EOS	1.3 km	MPC · JPL
715762	2015 XM_{302}	—	September 17, 2010	Mount Lemmon	Mount Lemmon Survey	·	1.6 km	MPC · JPL
715763	2015 XN_{302}	—	September 25, 1998	Apache Point	SDSS Collaboration	·	2.1 km	MPC · JPL
715764	2015 XZ_{303}	—	April 15, 2012	Haleakala	Pan-STARRS 1	·	2.4 km	MPC · JPL
715765	2015 XJ_{308}	—	April 24, 2006	Kitt Peak	Spacewatch	·	2.7 km	MPC · JPL
715766	2015 XB_{310}	—	September 18, 2009	Kitt Peak	Spacewatch	·	1.9 km	MPC · JPL
715767	2015 XS_{310}	—	December 8, 2015	Mount Lemmon	Mount Lemmon Survey	·	2.1 km	MPC · JPL
715768	2015 XA_{312}	—	December 8, 2015	Mount Lemmon	Mount Lemmon Survey	TIR	2.8 km	MPC · JPL
715769	2015 XK_{312}	—	October 25, 2005	Kitt Peak	Spacewatch	KOR	1.0 km	MPC · JPL
715770	2015 XU_{313}	—	September 27, 2009	Mount Lemmon	Mount Lemmon Survey	·	2.1 km	MPC · JPL
715771	2015 XB_{316}	—	November 24, 2006	Kitt Peak	Spacewatch	·	1.7 km	MPC · JPL
715772	2015 XE_{321}	—	January 27, 2011	Mount Lemmon	Mount Lemmon Survey	THM	2.0 km	MPC · JPL
715773	2015 XV_{322}	—	December 8, 2015	Haleakala	Pan-STARRS 1	·	460 m	MPC · JPL
715774	2015 XS_{323}	—	September 28, 2009	Kitt Peak	Spacewatch	·	1.7 km	MPC · JPL
715775	2015 XA_{324}	—	October 22, 2009	Mount Lemmon	Mount Lemmon Survey	·	2.4 km	MPC · JPL
715776	2015 XY_{324}	—	March 18, 2013	Kitt Peak	Spacewatch	·	890 m	MPC · JPL
715777	2015 XG_{325}	—	October 31, 2010	Piszkés-tető	K. Sárneczky, Z. Kuli	·	1.7 km	MPC · JPL
715778	2015 XK_{326}	—	December 2, 2010	Kitt Peak	Spacewatch	EOS	1.7 km	MPC · JPL
715779	2015 XV_{326}	—	January 14, 2011	Kitt Peak	Spacewatch	·	2.2 km	MPC · JPL
715780	2015 XV_{327}	—	August 28, 2014	Haleakala	Pan-STARRS 1	EOS	1.5 km	MPC · JPL
715781	2015 XZ_{328}	—	December 8, 2015	Haleakala	Pan-STARRS 1	EOS	1.2 km	MPC · JPL
715782	2015 XY_{329}	—	December 8, 2015	Haleakala	Pan-STARRS 1	TIR	2.5 km	MPC · JPL
715783	2015 XQ_{330}	—	August 22, 2014	Haleakala	Pan-STARRS 1	·	1.4 km	MPC · JPL
715784	2015 XB_{331}	—	December 8, 2015	Haleakala	Pan-STARRS 1	EOS	1.8 km	MPC · JPL
715785	2015 XC_{334}	—	November 9, 2004	Mauna Kea	Veillet, C.	·	1.6 km	MPC · JPL
715786	2015 XK_{334}	—	September 2, 2014	Haleakala	Pan-STARRS 1	·	2.3 km	MPC · JPL
715787	2015 XE_{335}	—	August 8, 2004	Socorro	LINEAR	·	720 m	MPC · JPL
715788	2015 XW_{336}	—	March 13, 2007	Mount Lemmon	Mount Lemmon Survey	·	1.8 km	MPC · JPL
715789	2015 XM_{337}	—	August 23, 2014	Haleakala	Pan-STARRS 1	EOS	1.6 km	MPC · JPL
715790	2015 XT_{338}	—	December 3, 2010	Mount Lemmon	Mount Lemmon Survey	·	2.2 km	MPC · JPL
715791	2015 XX_{338}	—	December 8, 2015	Haleakala	Pan-STARRS 1	·	760 m	MPC · JPL
715792	2015 XU_{342}	—	December 8, 2015	Haleakala	Pan-STARRS 1	·	1.9 km	MPC · JPL
715793	2015 XG_{343}	—	June 3, 2014	Haleakala	Pan-STARRS 1	EOS	2.1 km	MPC · JPL
715794	2015 XJ_{343}	—	December 8, 2015	Catalina	CSS	·	3.1 km	MPC · JPL
715795	2015 XP_{345}	—	October 30, 2010	Piszkés-tető	K. Sárneczky, Z. Kuli	·	1.4 km	MPC · JPL
715796	2015 XX_{345}	—	December 8, 2015	Haleakala	Pan-STARRS 1	·	2.3 km	MPC · JPL
715797	2015 XY_{347}	—	June 18, 2013	Haleakala	Pan-STARRS 1	·	1.5 km	MPC · JPL
715798	2015 XB_{349}	—	August 28, 2014	Haleakala	Pan-STARRS 1	·	1.9 km	MPC · JPL
715799	2015 XG_{349}	—	December 8, 2015	Haleakala	Pan-STARRS 1	·	2.1 km	MPC · JPL
715800	2015 XQ_{349}	—	December 8, 2015	Haleakala	Pan-STARRS 1	·	2.8 km	MPC · JPL

== 715801–715900 ==
back to top

Designation			Discovery			Properties		Ref
Permanent	Provisional	Named after	Date	Site	Discoverer(s)	Category	Diam.	Ref
715801	2015 XN_{350}	—	September 22, 2014	Haleakala	Pan-STARRS 1	·	2.2 km	MPC · JPL
715802	2015 XV_{352}	—	August 30, 2014	Haleakala	Pan-STARRS 1	·	2.4 km	MPC · JPL
715803	2015 XD_{355}	—	May 8, 2013	Haleakala	Pan-STARRS 1	·	2.4 km	MPC · JPL
715804	2015 XS_{355}	—	June 3, 2014	Haleakala	Pan-STARRS 1	·	2.2 km	MPC · JPL
715805	2015 XY_{355}	—	October 26, 2009	Kitt Peak	Spacewatch	·	2.6 km	MPC · JPL
715806	2015 XF_{357}	—	September 3, 2014	Mount Lemmon	Mount Lemmon Survey	·	2.3 km	MPC · JPL
715807	2015 XB_{359}	—	July 4, 2014	Haleakala	Pan-STARRS 1	·	1.9 km	MPC · JPL
715808	2015 XJ_{359}	—	April 22, 2012	Kitt Peak	Spacewatch	·	2.7 km	MPC · JPL
715809	2015 XW_{359}	—	October 21, 2015	Haleakala	Pan-STARRS 1	·	1.8 km	MPC · JPL
715810	2015 XG_{362}	—	August 28, 2014	Haleakala	Pan-STARRS 1	·	1.9 km	MPC · JPL
715811	2015 XC_{363}	—	December 9, 2015	Mount Lemmon	Mount Lemmon Survey	·	1.5 km	MPC · JPL
715812	2015 XF_{364}	—	July 25, 2014	Haleakala	Pan-STARRS 1	·	1.3 km	MPC · JPL
715813	2015 XR_{364}	—	November 30, 2010	Mount Lemmon	Mount Lemmon Survey	·	1.6 km	MPC · JPL
715814	2015 XF_{365}	—	July 29, 2014	Haleakala	Pan-STARRS 1	·	1.5 km	MPC · JPL
715815	2015 XM_{366}	—	December 12, 2015	Haleakala	Pan-STARRS 1	EUP	3.1 km	MPC · JPL
715816	2015 XU_{367}	—	November 11, 2010	Mount Lemmon	Mount Lemmon Survey	·	1.6 km	MPC · JPL
715817	2015 XY_{368}	—	December 6, 2015	Mount Lemmon	Mount Lemmon Survey	·	2.7 km	MPC · JPL
715818	2015 XB_{372}	—	December 12, 2015	Haleakala	Pan-STARRS 1	·	500 m	MPC · JPL
715819	2015 XQ_{372}	—	April 8, 2013	Kitt Peak	Spacewatch	·	2.4 km	MPC · JPL
715820	2015 XD_{375}	—	January 18, 2012	Mount Lemmon	Mount Lemmon Survey	·	1.2 km	MPC · JPL
715821	2015 XV_{375}	—	December 11, 2004	Kitt Peak	Spacewatch	(31811)	2.9 km	MPC · JPL
715822	2015 XJ_{380}	—	July 1, 2014	Haleakala	Pan-STARRS 1	·	1.6 km	MPC · JPL
715823	2015 XL_{381}	—	July 27, 1998	Caussols	ODAS	·	2.4 km	MPC · JPL
715824	2015 XF_{382}	—	October 26, 2009	Mount Lemmon	Mount Lemmon Survey	·	2.9 km	MPC · JPL
715825	2015 XB_{386}	—	December 4, 2015	Haleakala	Pan-STARRS 1	L5	7.0 km	MPC · JPL
715826	2015 XJ_{386}	—	December 14, 2015	Haleakala	Pan-STARRS 1	L5	6.7 km	MPC · JPL
715827	2015 XC_{393}	—	July 20, 2012	Mayhill-ISON	L. Elenin	·	3.1 km	MPC · JPL
715828	2015 XD_{394}	—	September 25, 2014	Catalina	CSS	PHO	890 m	MPC · JPL
715829	2015 XJ_{395}	—	November 17, 2014	Mount Lemmon	Mount Lemmon Survey	·	2.3 km	MPC · JPL
715830	2015 XK_{395}	—	January 31, 2006	Mount Lemmon	Mount Lemmon Survey	·	2.1 km	MPC · JPL
715831	2015 XW_{395}	—	January 28, 2011	Mount Lemmon	Mount Lemmon Survey	·	2.9 km	MPC · JPL
715832	2015 XL_{397}	—	December 11, 2014	Mount Lemmon	Mount Lemmon Survey	·	2.5 km	MPC · JPL
715833	2015 XN_{397}	—	December 13, 2015	Haleakala	Pan-STARRS 1	V	520 m	MPC · JPL
715834	2015 XL_{399}	—	February 26, 2011	Mount Lemmon	Mount Lemmon Survey	·	1.7 km	MPC · JPL
715835	2015 XP_{399}	—	December 10, 2014	Mount Lemmon	Mount Lemmon Survey	·	2.8 km	MPC · JPL
715836	2015 XR_{399}	—	September 13, 2013	Mount Lemmon	Mount Lemmon Survey	·	2.5 km	MPC · JPL
715837	2015 XY_{399}	—	December 11, 2014	Mount Lemmon	Mount Lemmon Survey	ELF	2.8 km	MPC · JPL
715838	2015 XZ_{399}	—	November 16, 2014	Kitt Peak	Spacewatch	·	3.1 km	MPC · JPL
715839	2015 XT_{400}	—	May 12, 2012	Mount Lemmon	Mount Lemmon Survey	·	1.9 km	MPC · JPL
715840	2015 XX_{400}	—	December 9, 2015	Haleakala	Pan-STARRS 1	·	910 m	MPC · JPL
715841	2015 XE_{401}	—	April 24, 2012	Haleakala	Pan-STARRS 1	·	2.6 km	MPC · JPL
715842	2015 XG_{401}	—	February 13, 2011	Mount Lemmon	Mount Lemmon Survey	·	2.6 km	MPC · JPL
715843	2015 XJ_{401}	—	November 8, 2009	Mount Lemmon	Mount Lemmon Survey	VER	2.4 km	MPC · JPL
715844	2015 XL_{401}	—	November 8, 2009	Mount Lemmon	Mount Lemmon Survey	·	2.0 km	MPC · JPL
715845	2015 XX_{403}	—	June 9, 2012	Mount Lemmon	Mount Lemmon Survey	EOS	1.8 km	MPC · JPL
715846	2015 XN_{404}	—	February 14, 2012	Haleakala	Pan-STARRS 1	·	1.6 km	MPC · JPL
715847	2015 XP_{404}	—	December 1, 2015	Haleakala	Pan-STARRS 1	·	1.8 km	MPC · JPL
715848	2015 XX_{404}	—	April 23, 2012	Kitt Peak	Spacewatch	ARM	3.1 km	MPC · JPL
715849	2015 XO_{405}	—	March 2, 2011	Mount Lemmon	Mount Lemmon Survey	·	3.0 km	MPC · JPL
715850	2015 XS_{405}	—	July 8, 2014	Haleakala	Pan-STARRS 1	EOS	1.4 km	MPC · JPL
715851	2015 XF_{406}	—	March 28, 2011	Catalina	CSS	·	3.4 km	MPC · JPL
715852	2015 XD_{407}	—	September 20, 2009	Kitt Peak	Spacewatch	·	2.3 km	MPC · JPL
715853	2015 XP_{408}	—	December 6, 2015	Mount Lemmon	Mount Lemmon Survey	·	3.0 km	MPC · JPL
715854	2015 XU_{410}	—	February 14, 2012	Haleakala	Pan-STARRS 1	·	1.5 km	MPC · JPL
715855	2015 XV_{410}	—	November 12, 2010	Mount Lemmon	Mount Lemmon Survey	·	1.4 km	MPC · JPL
715856	2015 XB_{411}	—	December 8, 2015	Mount Lemmon	Mount Lemmon Survey	·	3.1 km	MPC · JPL
715857	2015 XD_{411}	—	December 8, 2015	Mount Lemmon	Mount Lemmon Survey	·	2.9 km	MPC · JPL
715858	2015 XH_{411}	—	October 28, 2010	Mount Lemmon	Mount Lemmon Survey	BRA	1.3 km	MPC · JPL
715859	2015 XU_{411}	—	January 14, 2011	Mount Lemmon	Mount Lemmon Survey	·	1.8 km	MPC · JPL
715860	2015 XP_{414}	—	March 6, 2011	Mount Lemmon	Mount Lemmon Survey	EOS	1.8 km	MPC · JPL
715861	2015 XD_{416}	—	December 9, 2015	Haleakala	Pan-STARRS 1	·	3.1 km	MPC · JPL
715862	2015 XF_{416}	—	December 10, 2015	Mount Lemmon	Mount Lemmon Survey	·	1.8 km	MPC · JPL
715863	2015 XG_{416}	—	August 18, 2009	Kitt Peak	Spacewatch	·	2.1 km	MPC · JPL
715864	2015 XB_{417}	—	August 21, 2014	Haleakala	Pan-STARRS 1	EOS	1.6 km	MPC · JPL
715865	2015 XF_{417}	—	July 29, 2008	Kitt Peak	Spacewatch	EOS	1.4 km	MPC · JPL
715866	2015 XH_{418}	—	August 15, 2013	Haleakala	Pan-STARRS 1	·	2.3 km	MPC · JPL
715867	2015 XJ_{418}	—	November 9, 2008	Kitt Peak	Spacewatch	·	2.7 km	MPC · JPL
715868	2015 XW_{418}	—	September 13, 2013	Kitt Peak	Spacewatch	·	2.7 km	MPC · JPL
715869	2015 XN_{420}	—	February 2, 2008	Kitt Peak	Spacewatch	·	1.2 km	MPC · JPL
715870	2015 XO_{420}	—	December 14, 2015	Haleakala	Pan-STARRS 1	·	2.1 km	MPC · JPL
715871	2015 XQ_{420}	—	December 5, 2010	Mount Lemmon	Mount Lemmon Survey	·	1.9 km	MPC · JPL
715872	2015 XV_{421}	—	May 25, 2006	Kitt Peak	Spacewatch	·	2.7 km	MPC · JPL
715873	2015 XA_{422}	—	April 10, 2005	Kitt Peak	Spacewatch	·	1.1 km	MPC · JPL
715874	2015 XD_{423}	—	December 9, 2015	Mount Lemmon	Mount Lemmon Survey	EOS	1.5 km	MPC · JPL
715875	2015 XW_{442}	—	December 8, 2015	Mount Lemmon	Mount Lemmon Survey	EOS	1.3 km	MPC · JPL
715876	2015 XO_{443}	—	December 8, 2015	Haleakala	Pan-STARRS 1	·	1.8 km	MPC · JPL
715877	2015 XX_{443}	—	December 9, 2015	Haleakala	Pan-STARRS 1	·	3.2 km	MPC · JPL
715878	2015 XA_{445}	—	December 8, 2015	Haleakala	Pan-STARRS 1	·	1.4 km	MPC · JPL
715879	2015 XU_{448}	—	December 14, 2015	Mount Lemmon	Mount Lemmon Survey	·	1.9 km	MPC · JPL
715880	2015 XY_{449}	—	December 9, 2015	Mount Lemmon	Mount Lemmon Survey	·	1.8 km	MPC · JPL
715881	2015 XC_{453}	—	September 27, 2009	Mount Lemmon	Mount Lemmon Survey	·	2.5 km	MPC · JPL
715882	2015 XE_{453}	—	December 14, 2015	Haleakala	Pan-STARRS 1	·	2.8 km	MPC · JPL
715883	2015 XR_{454}	—	December 13, 2015	Haleakala	Pan-STARRS 1	·	2.0 km	MPC · JPL
715884	2015 XV_{454}	—	December 9, 2015	Haleakala	Pan-STARRS 1	·	2.3 km	MPC · JPL
715885	2015 XS_{457}	—	December 8, 2015	Haleakala	Pan-STARRS 1	EOS	1.2 km	MPC · JPL
715886	2015 XM_{462}	—	December 14, 2015	Haleakala	Pan-STARRS 1	EOS	1.6 km	MPC · JPL
715887	2015 XE_{463}	—	December 14, 2015	Mount Lemmon	Mount Lemmon Survey	·	2.4 km	MPC · JPL
715888	2015 XN_{463}	—	December 6, 2015	Mount Lemmon	Mount Lemmon Survey	·	2.6 km	MPC · JPL
715889	2015 XB_{465}	—	December 13, 2015	Haleakala	Pan-STARRS 1	·	1.9 km	MPC · JPL
715890	2015 XC_{469}	—	December 14, 2015	Haleakala	Pan-STARRS 1	·	2.0 km	MPC · JPL
715891	2015 XQ_{469}	—	December 9, 2015	Haleakala	Pan-STARRS 1	·	2.1 km	MPC · JPL
715892	2015 XG_{475}	—	December 9, 2015	Haleakala	Pan-STARRS 1	·	630 m	MPC · JPL
715893	2015 XW_{477}	—	December 14, 2015	Haleakala	Pan-STARRS 1	·	1.4 km	MPC · JPL
715894	2015 XE_{481}	—	December 13, 2015	Haleakala	Pan-STARRS 1	PHO	610 m	MPC · JPL
715895	2015 XJ_{482}	—	December 8, 2015	Haleakala	Pan-STARRS 1	EOS	1.5 km	MPC · JPL
715896	2015 XG_{486}	—	December 14, 2015	Haleakala	Pan-STARRS 1	·	2.3 km	MPC · JPL
715897	2015 XW_{487}	—	December 8, 2015	Haleakala	Pan-STARRS 1	·	2.0 km	MPC · JPL
715898	2015 XJ_{494}	—	December 4, 2015	Mount Lemmon	Mount Lemmon Survey	·	1.3 km	MPC · JPL
715899	2015 XW_{505}	—	March 31, 2012	Mount Lemmon	Mount Lemmon Survey	·	2.1 km	MPC · JPL
715900	2015 XJ_{509}	—	December 8, 2015	Haleakala	Pan-STARRS 1	·	2.2 km	MPC · JPL

== 715901–716000 ==
back to top

Designation			Discovery			Properties		Ref
Permanent	Provisional	Named after	Date	Site	Discoverer(s)	Category	Diam.	Ref
715901	2015 YS_{3}	—	November 20, 2008	Kitt Peak	Spacewatch	·	720 m	MPC · JPL
715902	2015 YK_{4}	—	July 1, 2013	Haleakala	Pan-STARRS 1	·	3.2 km	MPC · JPL
715903	2015 YA_{7}	—	June 26, 2014	Kitt Peak	Spacewatch	·	2.2 km	MPC · JPL
715904	2015 YK_{8}	—	December 17, 2003	Kitt Peak	Spacewatch	·	3.2 km	MPC · JPL
715905	2015 YA_{12}	—	January 6, 2006	Kitt Peak	Spacewatch	·	2.4 km	MPC · JPL
715906	2015 YS_{16}	—	September 27, 2003	Kitt Peak	Spacewatch	·	2.5 km	MPC · JPL
715907	2015 YC_{17}	—	January 28, 2011	Catalina	CSS	·	1.8 km	MPC · JPL
715908	2015 YU_{18}	—	March 19, 2013	Haleakala	Pan-STARRS 1	·	750 m	MPC · JPL
715909	2015 YB_{23}	—	December 19, 2004	Mount Lemmon	Mount Lemmon Survey	·	2.4 km	MPC · JPL
715910	2015 YJ_{23}	—	February 9, 2011	Mount Lemmon	Mount Lemmon Survey	·	1.9 km	MPC · JPL
715911	2015 YC_{24}	—	July 1, 2013	Haleakala	Pan-STARRS 1	·	2.5 km	MPC · JPL
715912	2015 YR_{24}	—	December 10, 2009	Mount Lemmon	Mount Lemmon Survey	·	2.8 km	MPC · JPL
715913	2015 YW_{24}	—	September 29, 2010	Mount Lemmon	Mount Lemmon Survey	THB	2.9 km	MPC · JPL
715914	2015 YG_{25}	—	December 18, 2015	Kitt Peak	Spacewatch	·	2.6 km	MPC · JPL
715915	2015 YN_{25}	—	December 13, 2010	Mount Lemmon	Mount Lemmon Survey	·	1.9 km	MPC · JPL
715916	2015 YW_{25}	—	October 3, 2014	Mount Lemmon	Mount Lemmon Survey	·	2.3 km	MPC · JPL
715917	2015 YL_{26}	—	December 18, 2015	Kitt Peak	Spacewatch	(5)	890 m	MPC · JPL
715918	2015 YQ_{27}	—	October 1, 2014	Haleakala	Pan-STARRS 1	·	2.6 km	MPC · JPL
715919	2015 YP_{29}	—	February 4, 2009	Kitt Peak	Spacewatch	MAS	490 m	MPC · JPL
715920	2015 YL_{34}	—	December 19, 2015	Mount Lemmon	Mount Lemmon Survey	·	2.4 km	MPC · JPL
715921	2015 YY_{36}	—	December 21, 2015	Mount Lemmon	Mount Lemmon Survey	KON	1.7 km	MPC · JPL
715922	2015 YB_{37}	—	December 19, 2015	Mount Lemmon	Mount Lemmon Survey	·	1.3 km	MPC · JPL
715923	2015 YX_{37}	—	December 18, 2015	Mount Lemmon	Mount Lemmon Survey	EOS	1.4 km	MPC · JPL
715924	2016 AU	—	November 20, 2009	Kitt Peak	Spacewatch	·	2.5 km	MPC · JPL
715925	2016 AN_{4}	—	January 8, 2011	Catalina	CSS	·	1.9 km	MPC · JPL
715926	2016 AC_{5}	—	January 2, 2016	Mount Lemmon	Mount Lemmon Survey	·	1.3 km	MPC · JPL
715927	2016 AE_{5}	—	January 2, 2016	Mount Lemmon	Mount Lemmon Survey	·	2.3 km	MPC · JPL
715928	2016 AN_{5}	—	December 11, 2010	Kitt Peak	Spacewatch	·	2.8 km	MPC · JPL
715929	2016 AE_{7}	—	October 21, 2003	Kitt Peak	Spacewatch	THM	1.8 km	MPC · JPL
715930	2016 AG_{11}	—	December 18, 2004	Kitt Peak	Spacewatch	·	3.4 km	MPC · JPL
715931	2016 AU_{11}	—	November 23, 2003	Kitt Peak	Spacewatch	·	2.5 km	MPC · JPL
715932	2016 AR_{12}	—	April 15, 2012	Haleakala	Pan-STARRS 1	EOS	1.6 km	MPC · JPL
715933	2016 AC_{15}	—	October 30, 2014	Mount Lemmon	Mount Lemmon Survey	·	3.1 km	MPC · JPL
715934	2016 AH_{15}	—	January 3, 2016	Mount Lemmon	Mount Lemmon Survey	·	3.1 km	MPC · JPL
715935	2016 AV_{16}	—	January 30, 2011	Mount Lemmon	Mount Lemmon Survey	·	3.2 km	MPC · JPL
715936	2016 AB_{17}	—	December 3, 2015	Mount Lemmon	Mount Lemmon Survey	·	2.2 km	MPC · JPL
715937	2016 AT_{17}	—	January 3, 2016	Mount Lemmon	Mount Lemmon Survey	·	2.6 km	MPC · JPL
715938	2016 AU_{17}	—	July 12, 2013	Haleakala	Pan-STARRS 1	·	2.4 km	MPC · JPL
715939	2016 AJ_{20}	—	March 2, 2011	Mount Lemmon	Mount Lemmon Survey	·	2.1 km	MPC · JPL
715940	2016 AD_{22}	—	December 3, 2010	Mount Lemmon	Mount Lemmon Survey	·	1.7 km	MPC · JPL
715941	2016 AE_{24}	—	May 19, 2012	Mount Lemmon	Mount Lemmon Survey	VER	2.4 km	MPC · JPL
715942	2016 AL_{25}	—	January 3, 2016	Haleakala	Pan-STARRS 1	·	2.5 km	MPC · JPL
715943	2016 AV_{25}	—	September 2, 2014	Haleakala	Pan-STARRS 1	·	720 m	MPC · JPL
715944	2016 AO_{27}	—	February 10, 2011	Mount Lemmon	Mount Lemmon Survey	EOS	1.7 km	MPC · JPL
715945	2016 AQ_{27}	—	January 25, 2009	Kitt Peak	Spacewatch	·	810 m	MPC · JPL
715946	2016 AS_{28}	—	January 14, 2011	Mount Lemmon	Mount Lemmon Survey	KOR	1.1 km	MPC · JPL
715947	2016 AV_{28}	—	January 3, 2016	Haleakala	Pan-STARRS 1	KOR	1.2 km	MPC · JPL
715948	2016 AK_{29}	—	January 12, 2011	Kitt Peak	Spacewatch	·	2.0 km	MPC · JPL
715949	2016 AZ_{30}	—	September 19, 2014	Haleakala	Pan-STARRS 1	·	1.3 km	MPC · JPL
715950	2016 AQ_{32}	—	October 18, 2011	Kitt Peak	Spacewatch	·	650 m	MPC · JPL
715951	2016 AH_{33}	—	September 25, 2014	Catalina	CSS	·	2.4 km	MPC · JPL
715952	2016 AC_{34}	—	October 24, 2009	Mount Lemmon	Mount Lemmon Survey	·	2.5 km	MPC · JPL
715953	2016 AM_{34}	—	February 4, 2000	Kitt Peak	Spacewatch	THM	1.8 km	MPC · JPL
715954	2016 AM_{35}	—	October 1, 2014	Haleakala	Pan-STARRS 1	·	2.3 km	MPC · JPL
715955	2016 AN_{35}	—	May 15, 2012	Kitt Peak	Spacewatch	·	2.7 km	MPC · JPL
715956	2016 AZ_{36}	—	January 13, 2005	Kitt Peak	Spacewatch	·	3.6 km	MPC · JPL
715957	2016 AT_{38}	—	January 4, 2016	Haleakala	Pan-STARRS 1	·	2.8 km	MPC · JPL
715958	2016 AJ_{39}	—	March 5, 2013	Haleakala	Pan-STARRS 1	·	770 m	MPC · JPL
715959	2016 AL_{39}	—	May 25, 2003	Kitt Peak	Spacewatch	·	510 m	MPC · JPL
715960	2016 AS_{40}	—	January 4, 2016	Haleakala	Pan-STARRS 1	(2076)	520 m	MPC · JPL
715961	2016 AC_{41}	—	September 26, 2003	Apache Point	SDSS	·	2.9 km	MPC · JPL
715962	2016 AR_{41}	—	January 2, 2009	Kitt Peak	Spacewatch	·	730 m	MPC · JPL
715963	2016 AC_{42}	—	January 4, 2016	Haleakala	Pan-STARRS 1	·	2.6 km	MPC · JPL
715964	2016 AW_{43}	—	February 5, 2011	Bisei	BATTeRS	·	2.7 km	MPC · JPL
715965	2016 AE_{45}	—	August 4, 2013	Haleakala	Pan-STARRS 1	EOS	1.8 km	MPC · JPL
715966	2016 AX_{45}	—	May 8, 2008	Kitt Peak	Spacewatch	·	1.9 km	MPC · JPL
715967	2016 AY_{45}	—	July 13, 2013	Haleakala	Pan-STARRS 1	BRA	1.4 km	MPC · JPL
715968	2016 AB_{46}	—	October 25, 2009	Kitt Peak	Spacewatch	·	1.9 km	MPC · JPL
715969	2016 AY_{46}	—	January 4, 2016	Haleakala	Pan-STARRS 1	·	2.5 km	MPC · JPL
715970	2016 AW_{47}	—	March 29, 2012	Haleakala	Pan-STARRS 1	·	1.9 km	MPC · JPL
715971	2016 AG_{49}	—	March 4, 2005	Mount Lemmon	Mount Lemmon Survey	THM	1.9 km	MPC · JPL
715972	2016 AN_{50}	—	December 3, 2015	Mount Lemmon	Mount Lemmon Survey	·	610 m	MPC · JPL
715973	2016 AE_{52}	—	February 5, 2011	Haleakala	Pan-STARRS 1	·	2.2 km	MPC · JPL
715974	2016 AF_{52}	—	December 6, 2015	Mount Lemmon	Mount Lemmon Survey	·	900 m	MPC · JPL
715975	2016 AZ_{56}	—	October 22, 2014	Mount Lemmon	Mount Lemmon Survey	·	2.6 km	MPC · JPL
715976	2016 AD_{57}	—	October 1, 2014	Haleakala	Pan-STARRS 1	·	2.9 km	MPC · JPL
715977	2016 AF_{57}	—	September 18, 2014	Haleakala	Pan-STARRS 1	AGN	830 m	MPC · JPL
715978	2016 AA_{60}	—	January 4, 2016	Haleakala	Pan-STARRS 1	·	2.4 km	MPC · JPL
715979	2016 AF_{60}	—	August 23, 2014	Haleakala	Pan-STARRS 1	·	1.9 km	MPC · JPL
715980	2016 AK_{61}	—	April 17, 2013	Cerro Tololo	DECam	·	700 m	MPC · JPL
715981	2016 AF_{62}	—	January 30, 2011	Haleakala	Pan-STARRS 1	·	2.7 km	MPC · JPL
715982	2016 AT_{64}	—	December 13, 2015	Haleakala	Pan-STARRS 1	H	360 m	MPC · JPL
715983	2016 AW_{67}	—	December 11, 2010	Kitt Peak	Spacewatch	EOS	1.8 km	MPC · JPL
715984	2016 AF_{70}	—	August 29, 2009	Kitt Peak	Spacewatch	KOR	1.0 km	MPC · JPL
715985	2016 AQ_{70}	—	October 14, 2009	Mount Lemmon	Mount Lemmon Survey	·	1.7 km	MPC · JPL
715986	2016 AR_{70}	—	November 21, 2009	Kitt Peak	Spacewatch	·	2.0 km	MPC · JPL
715987	2016 AU_{70}	—	December 14, 2010	Mount Lemmon	Mount Lemmon Survey	·	1.5 km	MPC · JPL
715988	2016 AQ_{71}	—	December 14, 2015	Haleakala	Pan-STARRS 1	·	1.5 km	MPC · JPL
715989	2016 AX_{71}	—	August 23, 2014	Haleakala	Pan-STARRS 1	EOS	1.4 km	MPC · JPL
715990	2016 AO_{72}	—	September 19, 2014	Haleakala	Pan-STARRS 1	·	1.9 km	MPC · JPL
715991	2016 AQ_{72}	—	February 2, 2008	Kitt Peak	Spacewatch	·	1.5 km	MPC · JPL
715992	2016 AF_{73}	—	March 29, 2011	Siding Spring	SSS	·	3.3 km	MPC · JPL
715993	2016 AK_{76}	—	January 4, 2016	Haleakala	Pan-STARRS 1	·	2.0 km	MPC · JPL
715994	2016 AV_{77}	—	January 4, 2016	Haleakala	Pan-STARRS 1	EUP	2.8 km	MPC · JPL
715995	2016 AN_{78}	—	October 12, 2009	Nazaret	Muler, G.	·	2.1 km	MPC · JPL
715996	2016 AZ_{78}	—	August 22, 2014	Haleakala	Pan-STARRS 1	·	1.9 km	MPC · JPL
715997	2016 AA_{79}	—	January 4, 2016	Haleakala	Pan-STARRS 1	·	3.4 km	MPC · JPL
715998	2016 AG_{79}	—	December 3, 2014	Haleakala	Pan-STARRS 1	·	3.2 km	MPC · JPL
715999	2016 AA_{80}	—	September 16, 2014	Haleakala	Pan-STARRS 1	·	2.7 km	MPC · JPL
716000	2016 AB_{80}	—	October 8, 2008	Kitt Peak	Spacewatch	·	460 m	MPC · JPL

back to top

== Meaning of names ==
As minor planet discoveries are confirmed, they are given a permanent number by the IAU's Minor Planet Center (MPC), and the discoverers can then submit names for them, following the IAU's naming conventions. The list below concerns those minor planets in the specified number-range that have received names, and explains the meanings of those names.

Official naming citations of newly named small Solar System bodies are approved and published in a bulletin by IAU's Working Group for Small Bodies Nomenclature (WGSBN). Before May 2021, citations were published in MPC's Minor Planet Circulars for many decades. Recent citations can also be found on the JPL Small-Body Database (SBDB). Until his death in 2016, German astronomer Lutz D. Schmadel compiled these citations into the Dictionary of Minor Planet Names (DMP) and regularly updated the collection.

Based on Paul Herget's The Names of the Minor Planets, Schmadel also researched the unclear origin of numerous asteroids, most of which had been named prior to World War II. This article incorporates text from this source, which is in the public domain: SBDB New namings may only be added to this list below after official publication as the preannouncement of names is condemned. The WGSBN publishes a comprehensive guideline for the naming rules of non-cometary small Solar System bodies.

Named minor planet	Provisional	This minor planet was named for...	Ref · Catalog
715542 Tafforin	2015 XR_{20}	Jean-Pierre Tafforin (1957–2001), French amateur astronomer.	IAU · 715542
