= List of minor planets: 564001–565000 =

The following is a partial list of minor planets, running from minor-planet number 564001 through 565000, inclusive. The primary data for this and other partial lists is based on JPL's "Small-Body Orbital Elements" and data available from the Minor Planet Center. Critical list information is also provided by the MPC, unless otherwise specified from Lowell Observatory. A detailed description of the table's columns and additional sources are given on the main page including a complete list of every page in this series, and a statistical break-up on the dynamical classification of minor planets.

Also see the summary list of all named bodies in numerical and alphabetical order, and the corresponding naming citations for the number range of this particular list. New namings may only be added to this list after official publication, as the preannouncement of names is condemned by the Working Group for Small Bodies Nomenclature of the International Astronomical Union.

Near-Earth obj.	MBA (inner)	MBA (outer)	Centaur
Mars-crosser	MBA (middle)	Jupiter trojan	Trans-Neptunian obj.
Unclassified

== 564001–564100 ==
Designation			Discovery			Properties		Ref
Permanent	Provisional	Named after	Date	Site	Discoverer(s)	Category	Diam.	Ref
564001	2016 EJ_{227}	—	November 24, 2009	Mount Lemmon	Mount Lemmon Survey	·	1.4 km	MPC · JPL
564002	2016 EA_{228}	—	March 29, 2012	Haleakala	Pan-STARRS 1	·	1.5 km	MPC · JPL
564003	2016 ED_{228}	—	August 30, 2002	Kitt Peak	Spacewatch	EOS	1.7 km	MPC · JPL
564004	2016 EV_{228}	—	September 3, 2013	Mount Lemmon	Mount Lemmon Survey	·	1.4 km	MPC · JPL
564005	2016 EW_{228}	—	February 1, 2006	Kitt Peak	Spacewatch	AST	1.6 km	MPC · JPL
564006	2016 ED_{229}	—	October 9, 2008	Mount Lemmon	Mount Lemmon Survey	·	1.8 km	MPC · JPL
564007	2016 EE_{229}	—	December 12, 2014	Haleakala	Pan-STARRS 1	EOS	1.8 km	MPC · JPL
564008	2016 EJ_{229}	—	November 3, 2005	Kitt Peak	Spacewatch	·	1.4 km	MPC · JPL
564009	2016 EP_{229}	—	February 9, 2011	Mount Lemmon	Mount Lemmon Survey	HOF	2.1 km	MPC · JPL
564010	2016 EX_{229}	—	November 11, 2010	Mount Lemmon	Mount Lemmon Survey	·	1.1 km	MPC · JPL
564011	2016 EC_{230}	—	October 7, 2005	Mauna Kea	A. Boattini	·	1.7 km	MPC · JPL
564012	2016 EM_{230}	—	January 26, 2006	Kitt Peak	Spacewatch	KOR	1.3 km	MPC · JPL
564013	2016 EQ_{230}	—	January 16, 2011	Mount Lemmon	Mount Lemmon Survey	·	1.5 km	MPC · JPL
564014	2016 EX_{230}	—	November 17, 2014	Haleakala	Pan-STARRS 1	·	2.2 km	MPC · JPL
564015	2016 EY_{231}	—	November 22, 2009	Kitt Peak	Spacewatch	BRA	1.5 km	MPC · JPL
564016	2016 ED_{232}	—	October 25, 2008	Mount Lemmon	Mount Lemmon Survey	EOS	1.6 km	MPC · JPL
564017	2016 EP_{232}	—	March 28, 2012	Kitt Peak	Spacewatch	·	930 m	MPC · JPL
564018	2016 EF_{233}	—	January 21, 2015	Haleakala	Pan-STARRS 1	·	1.8 km	MPC · JPL
564019	2016 EG_{233}	—	March 4, 2016	Haleakala	Pan-STARRS 1	·	2.4 km	MPC · JPL
564020	2016 EY_{234}	—	February 14, 2004	Kitt Peak	Spacewatch	·	3.4 km	MPC · JPL
564021	2016 EC_{235}	—	December 26, 2013	Sandlot	G. Hug	·	3.0 km	MPC · JPL
564022	2016 EZ_{235}	—	July 13, 2013	Haleakala	Pan-STARRS 1	·	1.8 km	MPC · JPL
564023	2016 EK_{236}	—	February 15, 2010	Catalina	CSS	·	2.8 km	MPC · JPL
564024	2016 EC_{237}	—	March 6, 2016	Haleakala	Pan-STARRS 1	·	1.6 km	MPC · JPL
564025	2016 EM_{237}	—	January 18, 2015	Mount Lemmon	Mount Lemmon Survey	·	2.1 km	MPC · JPL
564026	2016 EN_{237}	—	May 22, 2011	Mount Lemmon	Mount Lemmon Survey	·	2.7 km	MPC · JPL
564027	2016 ER_{237}	—	October 16, 2007	Mount Lemmon	Mount Lemmon Survey	(5651)	2.6 km	MPC · JPL
564028	2016 EE_{238}	—	March 7, 2016	Haleakala	Pan-STARRS 1	·	1.7 km	MPC · JPL
564029	2016 EL_{239}	—	October 21, 2008	Mount Lemmon	Mount Lemmon Survey	·	2.5 km	MPC · JPL
564030	2016 ER_{239}	—	June 4, 2005	Kitt Peak	Spacewatch	·	2.3 km	MPC · JPL
564031	2016 EF_{240}	—	September 24, 2008	Mount Lemmon	Mount Lemmon Survey	·	2.2 km	MPC · JPL
564032	2016 EX_{241}	—	August 15, 2013	Haleakala	Pan-STARRS 1	KOR	1.1 km	MPC · JPL
564033	2016 EA_{242}	—	October 3, 2013	Haleakala	Pan-STARRS 1	·	2.2 km	MPC · JPL
564034	2016 EL_{242}	—	October 19, 2003	Apache Point	SDSS Collaboration	·	1.9 km	MPC · JPL
564035	2016 EC_{244}	—	September 28, 2013	Mount Lemmon	Mount Lemmon Survey	KOR	1.1 km	MPC · JPL
564036	2016 EV_{244}	—	March 21, 2002	Kitt Peak	Spacewatch	·	1.8 km	MPC · JPL
564037	2016 EE_{245}	—	April 30, 2005	Kitt Peak	Spacewatch	·	2.6 km	MPC · JPL
564038	2016 EK_{247}	—	February 9, 2015	Mount Lemmon	Mount Lemmon Survey	·	2.1 km	MPC · JPL
564039	2016 EL_{247}	—	October 23, 2008	Mount Lemmon	Mount Lemmon Survey	·	1.4 km	MPC · JPL
564040	2016 EM_{247}	—	December 3, 2005	Mauna Kea	A. Boattini	KOR	1.1 km	MPC · JPL
564041	2016 EK_{248}	—	February 10, 2011	Mount Lemmon	Mount Lemmon Survey	EUN	1.2 km	MPC · JPL
564042	2016 EX_{248}	—	January 24, 2015	Haleakala	Pan-STARRS 1	·	1.8 km	MPC · JPL
564043	2016 EZ_{249}	—	March 7, 2016	Haleakala	Pan-STARRS 1	·	1.3 km	MPC · JPL
564044	2016 EB_{251}	—	March 12, 2016	Haleakala	Pan-STARRS 1	GEF	950 m	MPC · JPL
564045	2016 EN_{257}	—	November 3, 2008	Mount Lemmon	Mount Lemmon Survey	·	3.3 km	MPC · JPL
564046	2016 EG_{260}	—	March 2, 2016	Haleakala	Pan-STARRS 1	·	1.2 km	MPC · JPL
564047	2016 ED_{263}	—	February 8, 2011	Mount Lemmon	Mount Lemmon Survey	·	1.5 km	MPC · JPL
564048	2016 EP_{274}	—	March 11, 2016	Haleakala	Pan-STARRS 1	·	1.7 km	MPC · JPL
564049	2016 ES_{287}	—	March 6, 2016	Haleakala	Pan-STARRS 1	·	2.1 km	MPC · JPL
564050	2016 EK_{291}	—	January 7, 2010	Kitt Peak	Spacewatch	·	2.2 km	MPC · JPL
564051	2016 FV_{1}	—	September 14, 2013	Haleakala	Pan-STARRS 1	·	1.7 km	MPC · JPL
564052 Melissagraham	2016 FY_{1}	Melissagraham	November 22, 2006	Mauna Kea	D. D. Balam, K. M. Perrett	HNS	910 m	MPC · JPL
564053	2016 FL_{2}	—	April 26, 2007	Mount Lemmon	Mount Lemmon Survey	·	1.8 km	MPC · JPL
564054	2016 FO_{2}	—	February 2, 2006	Catalina	CSS	·	1.7 km	MPC · JPL
564055	2016 FE_{3}	—	August 17, 2006	La Silla	Vuissoz, C., Pernier, B.	H	680 m	MPC · JPL
564056	2016 FG_{3}	—	December 12, 2012	Haleakala	Pan-STARRS 1	H	470 m	MPC · JPL
564057	2016 FR_{3}	—	June 7, 2014	Haleakala	Pan-STARRS 1	·	510 m	MPC · JPL
564058	2016 FC_{4}	—	March 7, 2005	Socorro	LINEAR	·	3.1 km	MPC · JPL
564059	2016 FH_{4}	—	September 5, 2000	Apache Point	SDSS Collaboration	·	3.6 km	MPC · JPL
564060	2016 FN_{4}	—	March 21, 2010	Mount Lemmon	Mount Lemmon Survey	·	3.5 km	MPC · JPL
564061	2016 FT_{4}	—	December 4, 2005	Kitt Peak	Spacewatch	·	1.6 km	MPC · JPL
564062	2016 FK_{5}	—	October 7, 2008	Mount Lemmon	Mount Lemmon Survey	EOS	1.8 km	MPC · JPL
564063	2016 FZ_{6}	—	April 5, 2000	Socorro	LINEAR	·	2.5 km	MPC · JPL
564064	2016 FE_{7}	—	October 5, 2013	Mount Lemmon	Mount Lemmon Survey	·	2.2 km	MPC · JPL
564065	2016 FM_{7}	—	October 25, 2003	Kitt Peak	Spacewatch	·	2.9 km	MPC · JPL
564066	2016 FT_{7}	—	March 6, 2011	Kitt Peak	Spacewatch	H	480 m	MPC · JPL
564067	2016 FH_{8}	—	October 22, 2003	Apache Point	SDSS	EOS	1.8 km	MPC · JPL
564068	2016 FZ_{8}	—	September 12, 2007	Kitt Peak	Spacewatch	EOS	2.1 km	MPC · JPL
564069	2016 FB_{9}	—	October 29, 2014	Kitt Peak	Spacewatch	·	2.1 km	MPC · JPL
564070	2016 FJ_{10}	—	November 28, 2014	Haleakala	Pan-STARRS 1	·	1.5 km	MPC · JPL
564071	2016 FT_{10}	—	March 15, 2007	Mount Lemmon	Mount Lemmon Survey	·	1.5 km	MPC · JPL
564072	2016 FU_{10}	—	October 16, 2009	Mount Lemmon	Mount Lemmon Survey	HOF	2.1 km	MPC · JPL
564073	2016 FX_{10}	—	March 27, 2012	Kitt Peak	Spacewatch	·	1.6 km	MPC · JPL
564074	2016 FZ_{10}	—	July 29, 2008	Kitt Peak	Spacewatch	TIN	1.1 km	MPC · JPL
564075	2016 FY_{11}	—	April 4, 2011	Kitt Peak	Spacewatch	EOS	1.8 km	MPC · JPL
564076	2016 FZ_{11}	—	December 7, 2005	Kitt Peak	Spacewatch	·	2.4 km	MPC · JPL
564077	2016 FK_{12}	—	March 15, 2011	Haleakala	Pan-STARRS 1	H	320 m	MPC · JPL
564078	2016 FJ_{15}	—	February 17, 2007	Mount Lemmon	Mount Lemmon Survey	·	1.7 km	MPC · JPL
564079	2016 FK_{15}	—	April 17, 2012	Kitt Peak	Spacewatch	·	1.9 km	MPC · JPL
564080	2016 FU_{15}	—	January 27, 2006	Kitt Peak	Spacewatch	·	1.8 km	MPC · JPL
564081	2016 FY_{15}	—	September 23, 2008	Mount Lemmon	Mount Lemmon Survey	EOS	1.6 km	MPC · JPL
564082	2016 FU_{16}	—	April 7, 2006	Kitt Peak	Spacewatch	EOS	1.6 km	MPC · JPL
564083	2016 FX_{17}	—	September 5, 2008	Kitt Peak	Spacewatch	·	1.9 km	MPC · JPL
564084	2016 FC_{18}	—	November 16, 2014	Mount Lemmon	Mount Lemmon Survey	·	1.7 km	MPC · JPL
564085	2016 FG_{19}	—	November 17, 2014	Haleakala	Pan-STARRS 1	·	1.4 km	MPC · JPL
564086	2016 FW_{19}	—	August 10, 2002	Cerro Tololo	Deep Ecliptic Survey	·	2.2 km	MPC · JPL
564087	2016 FF_{20}	—	May 1, 2006	Kitt Peak	Deep Ecliptic Survey	·	1.3 km	MPC · JPL
564088	2016 FP_{20}	—	November 1, 2013	Mount Lemmon	Mount Lemmon Survey	·	1.8 km	MPC · JPL
564089	2016 FP_{22}	—	May 20, 2012	Mount Lemmon	Mount Lemmon Survey	·	1.4 km	MPC · JPL
564090	2016 FR_{22}	—	March 4, 2005	Mount Lemmon	Mount Lemmon Survey	·	1.7 km	MPC · JPL
564091	2016 FR_{25}	—	March 2, 2006	Kitt Peak	Spacewatch	KOR	1.4 km	MPC · JPL
564092	2016 FW_{26}	—	September 3, 2013	Calar Alto	F. Hormuth	·	1.8 km	MPC · JPL
564093	2016 FL_{27}	—	September 3, 2008	Kitt Peak	Spacewatch	·	1.8 km	MPC · JPL
564094	2016 FT_{27}	—	November 8, 2008	Mount Lemmon	Mount Lemmon Survey	·	2.5 km	MPC · JPL
564095	2016 FU_{27}	—	October 12, 2013	Calvin-Rehoboth	L. A. Molnar	·	1.4 km	MPC · JPL
564096	2016 FL_{29}	—	November 21, 2014	Haleakala	Pan-STARRS 1	·	1.6 km	MPC · JPL
564097	2016 FR_{29}	—	September 15, 2013	Kitt Peak	Spacewatch	·	1.5 km	MPC · JPL
564098	2016 FX_{29}	—	March 27, 2011	Mount Lemmon	Mount Lemmon Survey	EOS	1.9 km	MPC · JPL
564099	2016 FN_{31}	—	June 15, 2006	Kitt Peak	Spacewatch	EOS	2.1 km	MPC · JPL
564100	2016 FY_{31}	—	April 30, 2009	Kitt Peak	Spacewatch	MAS	650 m	MPC · JPL

== 564101–564200 ==
back to top

Designation			Discovery			Properties		Ref
Permanent	Provisional	Named after	Date	Site	Discoverer(s)	Category	Diam.	Ref
564101	2016 FB_{32}	—	April 18, 2007	Kitt Peak	Spacewatch	·	2.1 km	MPC · JPL
564102	2016 FJ_{32}	—	March 10, 2016	Haleakala	Pan-STARRS 1	·	2.2 km	MPC · JPL
564103	2016 FY_{32}	—	June 4, 2011	Mount Lemmon	Mount Lemmon Survey	·	2.6 km	MPC · JPL
564104	2016 FG_{33}	—	March 10, 2005	Mount Lemmon	Mount Lemmon Survey	·	2.3 km	MPC · JPL
564105	2016 FK_{33}	—	November 9, 2004	Mauna Kea	Veillet, C.	·	1.6 km	MPC · JPL
564106	2016 FN_{33}	—	February 21, 2006	Mount Lemmon	Mount Lemmon Survey	·	1.4 km	MPC · JPL
564107	2016 FW_{33}	—	March 29, 2011	Kitt Peak	Spacewatch	·	2.7 km	MPC · JPL
564108	2016 FR_{34}	—	August 19, 2001	Cerro Tololo	Deep Ecliptic Survey	·	1.9 km	MPC · JPL
564109	2016 FD_{35}	—	April 18, 2007	Mount Lemmon	Mount Lemmon Survey	·	2.2 km	MPC · JPL
564110	2016 FF_{35}	—	October 26, 2008	Mount Lemmon	Mount Lemmon Survey	·	1.8 km	MPC · JPL
564111	2016 FH_{35}	—	March 2, 2005	Kitt Peak	Spacewatch	·	1.8 km	MPC · JPL
564112	2016 FK_{35}	—	April 2, 2006	Kitt Peak	Spacewatch	·	1.7 km	MPC · JPL
564113	2016 FL_{35}	—	March 4, 2006	Kitt Peak	Spacewatch	KOR	1.3 km	MPC · JPL
564114	2016 FC_{37}	—	May 22, 2011	Mount Lemmon	Mount Lemmon Survey	EOS	1.8 km	MPC · JPL
564115	2016 FP_{37}	—	January 12, 2010	Kitt Peak	Spacewatch	·	2.0 km	MPC · JPL
564116	2016 FE_{38}	—	November 25, 2005	Mount Lemmon	Mount Lemmon Survey	GEF	1.1 km	MPC · JPL
564117	2016 FY_{38}	—	March 11, 2005	Kitt Peak	Spacewatch	·	2.7 km	MPC · JPL
564118	2016 FZ_{39}	—	August 12, 2013	Haleakala	Pan-STARRS 1	·	2.0 km	MPC · JPL
564119	2016 FV_{40}	—	January 7, 2006	Mount Lemmon	Mount Lemmon Survey	GEF	1.2 km	MPC · JPL
564120	2016 FN_{41}	—	June 10, 2012	Haleakala	Pan-STARRS 1	·	1.6 km	MPC · JPL
564121	2016 FE_{42}	—	April 2, 2011	Kitt Peak	Spacewatch	·	2.2 km	MPC · JPL
564122	2016 FG_{42}	—	March 13, 2011	Mount Lemmon	Mount Lemmon Survey	EOS	2.1 km	MPC · JPL
564123	2016 FM_{42}	—	November 4, 2014	Mount Lemmon	Mount Lemmon Survey	·	3.4 km	MPC · JPL
564124	2016 FP_{42}	—	January 4, 2006	Kitt Peak	Spacewatch	·	1.9 km	MPC · JPL
564125	2016 FR_{42}	—	December 26, 2014	Haleakala	Pan-STARRS 1	·	3.0 km	MPC · JPL
564126	2016 FY_{42}	—	January 5, 2000	Kitt Peak	Spacewatch	·	1.8 km	MPC · JPL
564127	2016 FZ_{43}	—	August 8, 2013	Haleakala	Pan-STARRS 1	·	1.7 km	MPC · JPL
564128	2016 FK_{44}	—	April 7, 2003	Kitt Peak	Spacewatch	·	2.0 km	MPC · JPL
564129	2016 FP_{44}	—	February 17, 2007	Mount Lemmon	Mount Lemmon Survey	·	1.8 km	MPC · JPL
564130	2016 FS_{44}	—	March 24, 2003	Kitt Peak	Spacewatch	·	1.4 km	MPC · JPL
564131	2016 FA_{46}	—	October 1, 2008	Kitt Peak	Spacewatch	·	2.0 km	MPC · JPL
564132	2016 FK_{46}	—	September 12, 2004	Kitt Peak	Spacewatch	GEF	1.2 km	MPC · JPL
564133	2016 FL_{46}	—	September 28, 2009	Kitt Peak	Spacewatch	·	1.5 km	MPC · JPL
564134	2016 FQ_{46}	—	August 30, 2005	Kitt Peak	Spacewatch	EUN	1.3 km	MPC · JPL
564135	2016 FC_{48}	—	December 5, 2008	Kitt Peak	Spacewatch	·	3.0 km	MPC · JPL
564136	2016 FX_{48}	—	July 30, 2008	Mount Lemmon	Mount Lemmon Survey	·	1.9 km	MPC · JPL
564137	2016 FA_{49}	—	August 6, 2008	Siding Spring	SSS	·	2.7 km	MPC · JPL
564138	2016 FN_{49}	—	November 26, 2009	Mount Lemmon	Mount Lemmon Survey	AGN	900 m	MPC · JPL
564139	2016 FP_{49}	—	October 26, 2013	Kitt Peak	Spacewatch	·	2.1 km	MPC · JPL
564140	2016 FK_{50}	—	April 6, 2005	Mount Lemmon	Mount Lemmon Survey	·	2.0 km	MPC · JPL
564141	2016 FN_{50}	—	March 11, 2005	Mount Lemmon	Mount Lemmon Survey	·	2.4 km	MPC · JPL
564142	2016 FV_{50}	—	March 12, 2007	Kitt Peak	Spacewatch	·	1.8 km	MPC · JPL
564143	2016 FH_{51}	—	October 9, 2012	Mount Lemmon	Mount Lemmon Survey	·	2.2 km	MPC · JPL
564144	2016 FH_{52}	—	October 7, 2005	Mauna Kea	A. Boattini	AGN	1.6 km	MPC · JPL
564145	2016 FK_{53}	—	March 10, 2005	Mount Lemmon	Mount Lemmon Survey	·	2.7 km	MPC · JPL
564146	2016 FY_{53}	—	November 26, 2014	Haleakala	Pan-STARRS 1	·	1.9 km	MPC · JPL
564147	2016 FJ_{54}	—	February 14, 2005	Kitt Peak	Spacewatch	EOS	1.7 km	MPC · JPL
564148	2016 FU_{54}	—	April 4, 2005	Catalina	CSS	·	3.4 km	MPC · JPL
564149	2016 FM_{55}	—	November 28, 2013	Mount Lemmon	Mount Lemmon Survey	·	2.1 km	MPC · JPL
564150	2016 FS_{55}	—	November 1, 2013	Mount Lemmon	Mount Lemmon Survey	·	2.6 km	MPC · JPL
564151	2016 FU_{55}	—	March 10, 2011	Kitt Peak	Spacewatch	·	2.2 km	MPC · JPL
564152	2016 FK_{56}	—	April 1, 2011	Mount Lemmon	Mount Lemmon Survey	·	1.7 km	MPC · JPL
564153	2016 FR_{56}	—	June 15, 2007	Kitt Peak	Spacewatch	EOS	1.9 km	MPC · JPL
564154	2016 FW_{56}	—	September 12, 2007	Mount Lemmon	Mount Lemmon Survey	·	3.1 km	MPC · JPL
564155	2016 FB_{57}	—	June 1, 2006	Mount Lemmon	Mount Lemmon Survey	EOS	2.2 km	MPC · JPL
564156	2016 FD_{57}	—	January 15, 2005	Kitt Peak	Spacewatch	EOS	1.8 km	MPC · JPL
564157	2016 FF_{58}	—	April 5, 2011	Mount Lemmon	Mount Lemmon Survey	·	1.9 km	MPC · JPL
564158	2016 FJ_{58}	—	September 14, 2007	Catalina	CSS	·	2.8 km	MPC · JPL
564159	2016 FO_{58}	—	November 18, 2003	Kitt Peak	Spacewatch	·	1.9 km	MPC · JPL
564160	2016 FR_{59}	—	March 29, 2016	Cerro Tololo	DECam	other TNO	172 km	MPC · JPL
564161	2016 FY_{60}	—	November 12, 2001	Apache Point	SDSS	H	500 m	MPC · JPL
564162	2016 FO_{61}	—	March 17, 2016	Mount Lemmon	Mount Lemmon Survey	H	480 m	MPC · JPL
564163	2016 FR_{61}	—	March 19, 2016	Haleakala	Pan-STARRS 1	H	450 m	MPC · JPL
564164	2016 FO_{62}	—	January 16, 2015	Haleakala	Pan-STARRS 1	TIR	2.3 km	MPC · JPL
564165	2016 FP_{62}	—	June 18, 2005	Mount Lemmon	Mount Lemmon Survey	·	2.9 km	MPC · JPL
564166	2016 FX_{62}	—	December 21, 2014	Haleakala	Pan-STARRS 1	·	2.4 km	MPC · JPL
564167	2016 FD_{63}	—	November 26, 2014	Haleakala	Pan-STARRS 1	·	2.2 km	MPC · JPL
564168	2016 FQ_{63}	—	September 14, 2007	Mount Lemmon	Mount Lemmon Survey	·	2.9 km	MPC · JPL
564169	2016 FS_{63}	—	March 18, 2016	Haleakala	Pan-STARRS 1	·	2.2 km	MPC · JPL
564170	2016 FF_{64}	—	October 21, 2014	Mount Lemmon	Mount Lemmon Survey	·	1.5 km	MPC · JPL
564171	2016 FQ_{64}	—	August 4, 2003	Kitt Peak	Spacewatch	EUN	1.0 km	MPC · JPL
564172	2016 FQ_{65}	—	January 17, 2015	Mount Lemmon	Mount Lemmon Survey	·	2.3 km	MPC · JPL
564173	2016 FP_{66}	—	June 26, 2011	Mount Lemmon	Mount Lemmon Survey	·	1.5 km	MPC · JPL
564174	2016 FU_{66}	—	March 18, 2016	Mount Lemmon	Mount Lemmon Survey	·	1.5 km	MPC · JPL
564175	2016 FV_{66}	—	December 1, 2006	Mount Lemmon	Mount Lemmon Survey	·	1.7 km	MPC · JPL
564176	2016 FJ_{67}	—	December 2, 2014	Haleakala	Pan-STARRS 1	·	2.0 km	MPC · JPL
564177	2016 FQ_{67}	—	November 26, 2014	Haleakala	Pan-STARRS 1	·	1.5 km	MPC · JPL
564178	2016 FT_{67}	—	April 10, 2005	Kitt Peak	Spacewatch	·	2.5 km	MPC · JPL
564179	2016 FN_{71}	—	February 25, 2011	Mount Lemmon	Mount Lemmon Survey	·	1.5 km	MPC · JPL
564180	2016 GG	—	September 18, 2009	Kitt Peak	Spacewatch	H	310 m	MPC · JPL
564181	2016 GO	—	October 29, 1998	Socorro	LINEAR	H	680 m	MPC · JPL
564182	2016 GJ_{1}	—	October 3, 2013	Haleakala	Pan-STARRS 1	·	3.0 km	MPC · JPL
564183	2016 GN_{1}	—	February 2, 2006	Kitt Peak	Spacewatch	·	1.8 km	MPC · JPL
564184	2016 GT_{1}	—	October 15, 2009	Catalina	CSS	·	2.6 km	MPC · JPL
564185	2016 GB_{4}	—	January 2, 2012	Mount Lemmon	Mount Lemmon Survey	EUN	1.1 km	MPC · JPL
564186	2016 GL_{5}	—	September 18, 2009	Kitt Peak	Spacewatch	·	1.5 km	MPC · JPL
564187	2016 GQ_{5}	—	March 2, 2011	Mount Lemmon	Mount Lemmon Survey	·	1.5 km	MPC · JPL
564188	2016 GZ_{5}	—	September 19, 2003	Kitt Peak	Spacewatch	NAE	1.7 km	MPC · JPL
564189	2016 GK_{6}	—	September 27, 2003	Kitt Peak	Spacewatch	·	2.0 km	MPC · JPL
564190	2016 GU_{6}	—	December 29, 2014	Haleakala	Pan-STARRS 1	3:2	4.3 km	MPC · JPL
564191	2016 GG_{7}	—	April 2, 2011	Mount Lemmon	Mount Lemmon Survey	·	1.6 km	MPC · JPL
564192	2016 GJ_{7}	—	May 3, 2008	Mount Lemmon	Mount Lemmon Survey	·	1.1 km	MPC · JPL
564193	2016 GR_{7}	—	March 4, 2005	Mount Lemmon	Mount Lemmon Survey	TIR	2.2 km	MPC · JPL
564194	2016 GH_{8}	—	March 9, 2011	Mount Lemmon	Mount Lemmon Survey	AGN	1.1 km	MPC · JPL
564195	2016 GP_{8}	—	January 4, 2010	Kitt Peak	Spacewatch	HOF	2.2 km	MPC · JPL
564196	2016 GN_{9}	—	March 24, 2006	Bergisch Gladbach	W. Bickel	·	1.8 km	MPC · JPL
564197	2016 GN_{10}	—	September 20, 2007	Kitt Peak	Spacewatch	·	2.3 km	MPC · JPL
564198	2016 GC_{11}	—	September 10, 2007	Mount Lemmon	Mount Lemmon Survey	·	1.8 km	MPC · JPL
564199	2016 GN_{11}	—	March 14, 2007	Mount Lemmon	Mount Lemmon Survey	·	2.0 km	MPC · JPL
564200	2016 GB_{14}	—	October 28, 2008	Catalina	CSS	·	2.3 km	MPC · JPL

== 564201–564300 ==
back to top

Designation			Discovery			Properties		Ref
Permanent	Provisional	Named after	Date	Site	Discoverer(s)	Category	Diam.	Ref
564201	2016 GM_{14}	—	October 23, 2009	Mount Lemmon	Mount Lemmon Survey	·	1.4 km	MPC · JPL
564202	2016 GZ_{14}	—	September 23, 2008	Kitt Peak	Spacewatch	·	2.0 km	MPC · JPL
564203	2016 GA_{15}	—	September 7, 2008	Mount Lemmon	Mount Lemmon Survey	·	1.6 km	MPC · JPL
564204	2016 GS_{15}	—	February 3, 2000	Kitt Peak	Spacewatch	·	1.7 km	MPC · JPL
564205	2016 GL_{16}	—	March 12, 2007	Kitt Peak	Spacewatch	·	1.8 km	MPC · JPL
564206	2016 GO_{16}	—	September 3, 2013	Mount Lemmon	Mount Lemmon Survey	·	1.8 km	MPC · JPL
564207	2016 GE_{17}	—	November 11, 2009	Kitt Peak	Spacewatch	HOF	2.3 km	MPC · JPL
564208	2016 GC_{18}	—	April 14, 2007	Mount Lemmon	Mount Lemmon Survey	·	1.4 km	MPC · JPL
564209	2016 GB_{19}	—	September 24, 2008	Kitt Peak	Spacewatch	EOS	1.6 km	MPC · JPL
564210	2016 GL_{19}	—	January 16, 2015	Haleakala	Pan-STARRS 1	AGN	1.0 km	MPC · JPL
564211	2016 GH_{20}	—	March 4, 2005	Mount Lemmon	Mount Lemmon Survey	THM	2.2 km	MPC · JPL
564212	2016 GQ_{20}	—	November 17, 2014	Haleakala	Pan-STARRS 1	·	1.3 km	MPC · JPL
564213	2016 GC_{21}	—	October 1, 2003	Kitt Peak	Spacewatch	EOS	1.6 km	MPC · JPL
564214	2016 GG_{22}	—	September 5, 2013	Kitt Peak	Spacewatch	·	2.6 km	MPC · JPL
564215	2016 GP_{22}	—	September 4, 2008	Kitt Peak	Spacewatch	·	1.6 km	MPC · JPL
564216	2016 GC_{23}	—	February 25, 2006	Kitt Peak	Spacewatch	·	1.4 km	MPC · JPL
564217	2016 GN_{23}	—	February 25, 2011	Mount Lemmon	Mount Lemmon Survey	·	2.0 km	MPC · JPL
564218	2016 GT_{23}	—	September 24, 2008	Kitt Peak	Spacewatch	·	1.8 km	MPC · JPL
564219	2016 GU_{23}	—	April 5, 2005	Mount Lemmon	Mount Lemmon Survey	·	2.6 km	MPC · JPL
564220	2016 GA_{24}	—	March 4, 2005	Kitt Peak	Spacewatch	·	2.6 km	MPC · JPL
564221	2016 GE_{24}	—	October 28, 2008	Mount Lemmon	Mount Lemmon Survey	·	2.6 km	MPC · JPL
564222	2016 GR_{24}	—	September 5, 2008	Kitt Peak	Spacewatch	·	1.8 km	MPC · JPL
564223	2016 GD_{25}	—	May 9, 2006	Mount Lemmon	Mount Lemmon Survey	·	2.5 km	MPC · JPL
564224	2016 GN_{25}	—	March 10, 2016	Haleakala	Pan-STARRS 1	HOF	2.1 km	MPC · JPL
564225	2016 GP_{25}	—	October 25, 2009	Kitt Peak	Spacewatch	·	1.3 km	MPC · JPL
564226	2016 GY_{25}	—	September 9, 2008	Mount Lemmon	Mount Lemmon Survey	·	1.4 km	MPC · JPL
564227	2016 GL_{26}	—	July 13, 2013	Mount Lemmon	Mount Lemmon Survey	·	1.2 km	MPC · JPL
564228	2016 GE_{27}	—	October 14, 2009	Mount Lemmon	Mount Lemmon Survey	·	1.4 km	MPC · JPL
564229	2016 GV_{27}	—	September 6, 2013	Mount Lemmon	Mount Lemmon Survey	·	1.7 km	MPC · JPL
564230	2016 GB_{29}	—	November 1, 2014	Mount Lemmon	Mount Lemmon Survey	GEF	950 m	MPC · JPL
564231	2016 GK_{29}	—	March 8, 2005	Mount Lemmon	Mount Lemmon Survey	·	2.6 km	MPC · JPL
564232	2016 GA_{31}	—	February 10, 2010	Kitt Peak	Spacewatch	VER	2.4 km	MPC · JPL
564233	2016 GB_{32}	—	February 25, 2011	Mount Lemmon	Mount Lemmon Survey	·	1.6 km	MPC · JPL
564234	2016 GT_{32}	—	August 15, 2013	Haleakala	Pan-STARRS 1	KOR	1.1 km	MPC · JPL
564235	2016 GY_{32}	—	March 2, 2011	Mount Lemmon	Mount Lemmon Survey	·	1.4 km	MPC · JPL
564236	2016 GF_{33}	—	September 18, 2009	Kitt Peak	Spacewatch	GEF	950 m	MPC · JPL
564237	2016 GK_{33}	—	September 5, 2013	Kitt Peak	Spacewatch	·	2.7 km	MPC · JPL
564238	2016 GF_{34}	—	November 9, 2009	Mount Lemmon	Mount Lemmon Survey	·	1.6 km	MPC · JPL
564239	2016 GG_{34}	—	September 29, 2008	Kitt Peak	Spacewatch	·	2.2 km	MPC · JPL
564240	2016 GL_{36}	—	September 14, 2013	Mount Lemmon	Mount Lemmon Survey	·	2.5 km	MPC · JPL
564241	2016 GV_{36}	—	October 5, 2002	Palomar	NEAT	·	2.5 km	MPC · JPL
564242	2016 GD_{38}	—	March 13, 2016	Haleakala	Pan-STARRS 1	·	2.3 km	MPC · JPL
564243	2016 GS_{38}	—	March 10, 2016	Haleakala	Pan-STARRS 1	·	2.2 km	MPC · JPL
564244	2016 GW_{38}	—	November 8, 2009	Mount Lemmon	Mount Lemmon Survey	HOF	2.0 km	MPC · JPL
564245	2016 GE_{39}	—	October 7, 2013	Kitt Peak	Spacewatch	·	2.3 km	MPC · JPL
564246	2016 GG_{39}	—	February 16, 2001	Kitt Peak	Spacewatch	·	1.5 km	MPC · JPL
564247	2016 GV_{40}	—	November 16, 2009	Mount Lemmon	Mount Lemmon Survey	AGN	1.2 km	MPC · JPL
564248	2016 GB_{41}	—	March 10, 2005	Mount Lemmon	Mount Lemmon Survey	·	1.8 km	MPC · JPL
564249	2016 GC_{41}	—	September 4, 2013	Mount Lemmon	Mount Lemmon Survey	KOR	980 m	MPC · JPL
564250	2016 GD_{41}	—	March 5, 2006	Mount Lemmon	Mount Lemmon Survey	KOR	1.1 km	MPC · JPL
564251	2016 GS_{41}	—	September 24, 2013	Mount Lemmon	Mount Lemmon Survey	·	1.3 km	MPC · JPL
564252	2016 GT_{41}	—	September 28, 2013	Mount Lemmon	Mount Lemmon Survey	·	2.7 km	MPC · JPL
564253	2016 GL_{42}	—	September 15, 2013	Catalina	CSS	615	1.3 km	MPC · JPL
564254	2016 GT_{42}	—	October 3, 2013	Haleakala	Pan-STARRS 1	KOR	1.2 km	MPC · JPL
564255	2016 GO_{43}	—	November 26, 2014	Haleakala	Pan-STARRS 1	·	1.3 km	MPC · JPL
564256	2016 GX_{43}	—	October 7, 2008	Mount Lemmon	Mount Lemmon Survey	KOR	1.3 km	MPC · JPL
564257	2016 GG_{45}	—	September 12, 2007	Mount Lemmon	Mount Lemmon Survey	·	2.5 km	MPC · JPL
564258	2016 GT_{46}	—	September 3, 2008	Kitt Peak	Spacewatch	·	1.9 km	MPC · JPL
564259	2016 GA_{50}	—	July 14, 2013	Haleakala	Pan-STARRS 1	·	1.8 km	MPC · JPL
564260	2016 GL_{51}	—	February 4, 2006	Kitt Peak	Spacewatch	KOR	1.1 km	MPC · JPL
564261	2016 GU_{51}	—	January 5, 2006	Kitt Peak	Spacewatch	AGN	890 m	MPC · JPL
564262	2016 GV_{51}	—	October 10, 2007	Mount Lemmon	Mount Lemmon Survey	·	3.2 km	MPC · JPL
564263	2016 GS_{55}	—	September 22, 2009	Mount Lemmon	Mount Lemmon Survey	·	1.4 km	MPC · JPL
564264	2016 GT_{55}	—	October 12, 2013	Mount Lemmon	Mount Lemmon Survey	·	2.6 km	MPC · JPL
564265	2016 GQ_{56}	—	September 18, 2003	Kitt Peak	Spacewatch	KOR	1.2 km	MPC · JPL
564266	2016 GS_{56}	—	April 1, 2011	Kitt Peak	Spacewatch	BRA	1.2 km	MPC · JPL
564267	2016 GT_{56}	—	September 12, 2013	Kitt Peak	Spacewatch	·	1.7 km	MPC · JPL
564268	2016 GJ_{57}	—	September 18, 2003	Kitt Peak	Spacewatch	·	1.6 km	MPC · JPL
564269	2016 GK_{57}	—	March 11, 2011	Kitt Peak	Spacewatch	TEL	1.2 km	MPC · JPL
564270	2016 GL_{58}	—	November 10, 2004	Kitt Peak	Spacewatch	KOR	1.3 km	MPC · JPL
564271	2016 GQ_{58}	—	April 8, 2006	Kitt Peak	Spacewatch	·	2.3 km	MPC · JPL
564272	2016 GL_{59}	—	September 20, 2014	Haleakala	Pan-STARRS 1	·	1.7 km	MPC · JPL
564273	2016 GS_{59}	—	May 22, 2012	Mount Lemmon	Mount Lemmon Survey	·	1.9 km	MPC · JPL
564274	2016 GU_{59}	—	August 27, 2013	Calar Alto	F. Hormuth	·	1.4 km	MPC · JPL
564275	2016 GY_{59}	—	August 26, 2008	Parc National des Cévennes	C. Demeautis, J.-M. Lopez	·	1.6 km	MPC · JPL
564276	2016 GB_{61}	—	September 20, 2014	Haleakala	Pan-STARRS 1	·	1.4 km	MPC · JPL
564277	2016 GB_{63}	—	October 23, 2014	Mount Lemmon	Mount Lemmon Survey	·	3.0 km	MPC · JPL
564278	2016 GY_{64}	—	April 21, 2006	Kitt Peak	Spacewatch	·	1.6 km	MPC · JPL
564279	2016 GN_{65}	—	September 23, 2008	Kitt Peak	Spacewatch	·	1.5 km	MPC · JPL
564280 Tudorica	2016 GU_{65}	Tudorica	September 8, 2013	La Palma	EURONEAR	·	1.9 km	MPC · JPL
564281	2016 GE_{66}	—	March 6, 2011	Kitt Peak	Spacewatch	·	1.7 km	MPC · JPL
564282	2016 GR_{66}	—	December 10, 2009	Mount Lemmon	Mount Lemmon Survey	AST	1.3 km	MPC · JPL
564283	2016 GU_{66}	—	September 24, 2008	Kitt Peak	Spacewatch	EOS	1.5 km	MPC · JPL
564284	2016 GY_{66}	—	November 21, 2005	Kitt Peak	Spacewatch	·	1.4 km	MPC · JPL
564285	2016 GG_{67}	—	March 5, 2011	Mount Lemmon	Mount Lemmon Survey	HOF	1.8 km	MPC · JPL
564286	2016 GW_{67}	—	February 2, 2006	Mount Lemmon	Mount Lemmon Survey	·	1.9 km	MPC · JPL
564287	2016 GQ_{68}	—	December 21, 2014	Haleakala	Pan-STARRS 1	·	1.5 km	MPC · JPL
564288	2016 GG_{69}	—	January 13, 1999	Mauna Kea	Veillet, C., Anderson, J.	·	2.0 km	MPC · JPL
564289	2016 GK_{70}	—	October 6, 2004	Kitt Peak	Spacewatch	·	1.6 km	MPC · JPL
564290	2016 GN_{70}	—	January 26, 2006	Kitt Peak	Spacewatch	KOR	1.4 km	MPC · JPL
564291	2016 GH_{71}	—	October 25, 2013	Mount Lemmon	Mount Lemmon Survey	·	1.4 km	MPC · JPL
564292	2016 GO_{72}	—	October 16, 2007	Mount Lemmon	Mount Lemmon Survey	·	2.4 km	MPC · JPL
564293	2016 GP_{72}	—	September 12, 2013	Mount Lemmon	Mount Lemmon Survey	·	1.5 km	MPC · JPL
564294	2016 GE_{73}	—	December 28, 2005	Kitt Peak	Spacewatch	·	2.0 km	MPC · JPL
564295	2016 GG_{74}	—	September 29, 2008	Kitt Peak	Spacewatch	TIR	1.9 km	MPC · JPL
564296	2016 GF_{75}	—	September 21, 2000	Kitt Peak	Deep Ecliptic Survey	·	1.5 km	MPC · JPL
564297	2016 GF_{76}	—	December 9, 2014	Haleakala	Pan-STARRS 1	·	1.3 km	MPC · JPL
564298	2016 GH_{76}	—	November 1, 2008	Mount Lemmon	Mount Lemmon Survey	THM	1.7 km	MPC · JPL
564299	2016 GC_{77}	—	September 3, 2013	Haleakala	Pan-STARRS 1	·	1.5 km	MPC · JPL
564300	2016 GC_{80}	—	March 10, 2005	Mount Lemmon	Mount Lemmon Survey	·	1.7 km	MPC · JPL

== 564301–564400 ==
back to top

Designation			Discovery			Properties		Ref
Permanent	Provisional	Named after	Date	Site	Discoverer(s)	Category	Diam.	Ref
564301	2016 GK_{81}	—	September 19, 1998	Apache Point	SDSS Collaboration	·	1.4 km	MPC · JPL
564302	2016 GY_{81}	—	February 27, 2006	Kitt Peak	Spacewatch	KOR	1.5 km	MPC · JPL
564303	2016 GE_{82}	—	September 13, 2013	Kitt Peak	Spacewatch	·	1.7 km	MPC · JPL
564304	2016 GF_{82}	—	March 14, 2011	Kitt Peak	Spacewatch	·	1.9 km	MPC · JPL
564305	2016 GA_{83}	—	November 20, 2014	Haleakala	Pan-STARRS 1	·	1.5 km	MPC · JPL
564306	2016 GD_{83}	—	September 6, 2013	Kitt Peak	Spacewatch	·	2.1 km	MPC · JPL
564307	2016 GN_{83}	—	September 26, 2003	Apache Point	SDSS Collaboration	·	1.4 km	MPC · JPL
564308	2016 GW_{85}	—	March 25, 2000	Kitt Peak	Spacewatch	·	2.5 km	MPC · JPL
564309	2016 GK_{87}	—	August 7, 2008	Kitt Peak	Spacewatch	·	1.6 km	MPC · JPL
564310	2016 GX_{88}	—	May 23, 2006	Kitt Peak	Spacewatch	EOS	1.8 km	MPC · JPL
564311	2016 GU_{89}	—	December 25, 2005	Mount Lemmon	Mount Lemmon Survey	·	1.4 km	MPC · JPL
564312	2016 GG_{90}	—	November 20, 2003	Socorro	LINEAR	·	2.3 km	MPC · JPL
564313	2016 GP_{90}	—	October 15, 2004	Mount Lemmon	Mount Lemmon Survey	AGN	1.2 km	MPC · JPL
564314	2016 GT_{92}	—	February 11, 2016	Haleakala	Pan-STARRS 1	WIT	910 m	MPC · JPL
564315	2016 GF_{94}	—	November 26, 2014	Haleakala	Pan-STARRS 1	·	1.5 km	MPC · JPL
564316	2016 GH_{94}	—	October 1, 2013	Mount Lemmon	Mount Lemmon Survey	EOS	1.7 km	MPC · JPL
564317	2016 GM_{96}	—	January 20, 2015	Mount Lemmon	Mount Lemmon Survey	·	1.8 km	MPC · JPL
564318	2016 GX_{96}	—	October 3, 2013	Haleakala	Pan-STARRS 1	·	1.3 km	MPC · JPL
564319	2016 GM_{99}	—	September 23, 2008	Mount Lemmon	Mount Lemmon Survey	·	2.3 km	MPC · JPL
564320	2016 GN_{99}	—	July 14, 2013	Haleakala	Pan-STARRS 1	·	2.9 km	MPC · JPL
564321	2016 GP_{99}	—	December 3, 2008	Mount Lemmon	Mount Lemmon Survey	·	2.7 km	MPC · JPL
564322	2016 GD_{100}	—	April 20, 2012	Kitt Peak	Spacewatch	·	1.1 km	MPC · JPL
564323	2016 GB_{101}	—	September 23, 2008	Mount Lemmon	Mount Lemmon Survey	·	1.9 km	MPC · JPL
564324	2016 GC_{102}	—	September 28, 2003	Kitt Peak	Spacewatch	KOR	1.1 km	MPC · JPL
564325	2016 GQ_{103}	—	October 18, 2007	Kitt Peak	Spacewatch	·	3.0 km	MPC · JPL
564326	2016 GE_{104}	—	January 20, 2015	Haleakala	Pan-STARRS 1	KOR	1.1 km	MPC · JPL
564327	2016 GF_{104}	—	September 24, 2008	Mount Lemmon	Mount Lemmon Survey	KOR	1.1 km	MPC · JPL
564328	2016 GL_{105}	—	October 15, 2013	Kitt Peak	Spacewatch	EOS	1.8 km	MPC · JPL
564329	2016 GZ_{105}	—	October 27, 2008	Kitt Peak	Spacewatch	·	1.4 km	MPC · JPL
564330	2016 GU_{106}	—	September 28, 2008	Mount Lemmon	Mount Lemmon Survey	KOR	1.3 km	MPC · JPL
564331	2016 GP_{107}	—	April 5, 2011	Kitt Peak	Spacewatch	·	1.8 km	MPC · JPL
564332	2016 GB_{108}	—	August 14, 2013	Haleakala	Pan-STARRS 1	AGN	900 m	MPC · JPL
564333	2016 GT_{108}	—	March 28, 2011	Mount Lemmon	Mount Lemmon Survey	·	1.6 km	MPC · JPL
564334	2016 GD_{109}	—	February 16, 2010	Mount Lemmon	Mount Lemmon Survey	·	1.7 km	MPC · JPL
564335	2016 GD_{110}	—	December 5, 2008	Kitt Peak	Spacewatch	·	2.5 km	MPC · JPL
564336	2016 GP_{110}	—	September 12, 2007	Mount Lemmon	Mount Lemmon Survey	·	2.7 km	MPC · JPL
564337	2016 GP_{111}	—	January 5, 2010	Kitt Peak	Spacewatch	·	2.1 km	MPC · JPL
564338	2016 GO_{112}	—	October 23, 2013	Mount Lemmon	Mount Lemmon Survey	HOF	2.0 km	MPC · JPL
564339	2016 GP_{112}	—	July 14, 2013	Haleakala	Pan-STARRS 1	·	3.6 km	MPC · JPL
564340	2016 GM_{113}	—	September 17, 2013	Mount Lemmon	Mount Lemmon Survey	EOS	1.7 km	MPC · JPL
564341	2016 GO_{113}	—	October 3, 2013	Haleakala	Pan-STARRS 1	·	2.9 km	MPC · JPL
564342	2016 GS_{113}	—	October 9, 2013	Mount Lemmon	Mount Lemmon Survey	·	2.2 km	MPC · JPL
564343	2016 GT_{114}	—	December 24, 2005	Kitt Peak	Spacewatch	·	1.4 km	MPC · JPL
564344	2016 GC_{119}	—	August 30, 2005	Kitt Peak	Spacewatch	JUN	920 m	MPC · JPL
564345	2016 GO_{119}	—	December 16, 2014	Haleakala	Pan-STARRS 1	·	1.5 km	MPC · JPL
564346	2016 GU_{119}	—	October 2, 2008	Kitt Peak	Spacewatch	·	1.9 km	MPC · JPL
564347	2016 GK_{120}	—	March 6, 2011	Mount Lemmon	Mount Lemmon Survey	·	1.7 km	MPC · JPL
564348	2016 GW_{121}	—	December 26, 2014	Haleakala	Pan-STARRS 1	KOR	1.1 km	MPC · JPL
564349	2016 GA_{122}	—	October 10, 2007	Mount Lemmon	Mount Lemmon Survey	·	1.7 km	MPC · JPL
564350	2016 GM_{122}	—	December 29, 2014	Mount Lemmon	Mount Lemmon Survey	KOR	1.1 km	MPC · JPL
564351	2016 GW_{122}	—	September 28, 2013	Mount Lemmon	Mount Lemmon Survey	·	1.4 km	MPC · JPL
564352	2016 GO_{123}	—	April 9, 2006	Mount Lemmon	Mount Lemmon Survey	·	2.0 km	MPC · JPL
564353	2016 GU_{123}	—	October 7, 2008	Mount Lemmon	Mount Lemmon Survey	EOS	1.9 km	MPC · JPL
564354	2016 GV_{123}	—	September 14, 2013	Haleakala	Pan-STARRS 1	·	1.2 km	MPC · JPL
564355	2016 GW_{123}	—	September 14, 2007	Mount Lemmon	Mount Lemmon Survey	EOS	2.3 km	MPC · JPL
564356	2016 GV_{124}	—	January 30, 2011	Piszkés-tető	K. Sárneczky, Z. Kuli	·	1.9 km	MPC · JPL
564357	2016 GZ_{124}	—	October 23, 2013	Mount Lemmon	Mount Lemmon Survey	·	2.4 km	MPC · JPL
564358	2016 GY_{126}	—	September 14, 2007	Mount Lemmon	Mount Lemmon Survey	·	2.9 km	MPC · JPL
564359	2016 GH_{127}	—	March 4, 2016	Haleakala	Pan-STARRS 1	·	1.6 km	MPC · JPL
564360	2016 GX_{127}	—	September 12, 2013	Mount Lemmon	Mount Lemmon Survey	·	2.5 km	MPC · JPL
564361	2016 GY_{127}	—	October 3, 2013	Kitt Peak	Spacewatch	·	2.0 km	MPC · JPL
564362	2016 GB_{128}	—	December 16, 2009	Mount Lemmon	Mount Lemmon Survey	AGN	1.5 km	MPC · JPL
564363	2016 GL_{128}	—	January 6, 2003	Kitt Peak	Deep Lens Survey	·	2.4 km	MPC · JPL
564364	2016 GS_{128}	—	September 23, 2008	Mount Lemmon	Mount Lemmon Survey	·	1.8 km	MPC · JPL
564365	2016 GT_{128}	—	October 5, 2004	Kitt Peak	Spacewatch	AGN	1.2 km	MPC · JPL
564366	2016 GY_{128}	—	April 1, 2011	Mount Lemmon	Mount Lemmon Survey	·	1.7 km	MPC · JPL
564367	2016 GA_{129}	—	September 5, 2013	Kitt Peak	Spacewatch	·	2.1 km	MPC · JPL
564368	2016 GO_{130}	—	October 6, 2013	Kitt Peak	Spacewatch	·	2.3 km	MPC · JPL
564369	2016 GP_{131}	—	April 10, 2005	Mount Lemmon	Mount Lemmon Survey	TIR	2.3 km	MPC · JPL
564370	2016 GY_{131}	—	January 12, 2002	Palomar	NEAT	·	2.3 km	MPC · JPL
564371	2016 GT_{132}	—	April 14, 2008	Mount Lemmon	Mount Lemmon Survey	EUN	1.2 km	MPC · JPL
564372	2016 GU_{132}	—	November 22, 2014	Haleakala	Pan-STARRS 1	·	2.7 km	MPC · JPL
564373	2016 GN_{133}	—	May 16, 2007	Mount Lemmon	Mount Lemmon Survey	·	2.6 km	MPC · JPL
564374	2016 GP_{133}	—	November 9, 2013	Haleakala	Pan-STARRS 1	·	2.0 km	MPC · JPL
564375	2016 GE_{137}	—	September 11, 2004	Kitt Peak	Spacewatch	·	1.5 km	MPC · JPL
564376	2016 GJ_{138}	—	October 11, 2007	Catalina	CSS	·	3.2 km	MPC · JPL
564377	2016 GP_{138}	—	September 3, 2013	Kitt Peak	Spacewatch	·	1.7 km	MPC · JPL
564378	2016 GP_{139}	—	December 26, 2014	Haleakala	Pan-STARRS 1	·	1.6 km	MPC · JPL
564379	2016 GT_{139}	—	September 29, 2013	Mount Lemmon	Mount Lemmon Survey	·	1.7 km	MPC · JPL
564380	2016 GW_{139}	—	April 20, 2012	Mount Lemmon	Mount Lemmon Survey	·	1.5 km	MPC · JPL
564381	2016 GB_{140}	—	September 20, 2006	Kitt Peak	Spacewatch	·	2.6 km	MPC · JPL
564382	2016 GE_{140}	—	August 7, 2008	Kitt Peak	Spacewatch	·	3.1 km	MPC · JPL
564383	2016 GT_{142}	—	October 12, 2009	Mount Lemmon	Mount Lemmon Survey	·	2.5 km	MPC · JPL
564384	2016 GY_{142}	—	May 7, 2006	Mount Lemmon	Mount Lemmon Survey	·	1.6 km	MPC · JPL
564385	2016 GO_{144}	—	March 26, 2007	Kitt Peak	Spacewatch	·	1.8 km	MPC · JPL
564386	2016 GV_{144}	—	December 10, 2010	Kitt Peak	Spacewatch	EUN	1.6 km	MPC · JPL
564387	2016 GE_{146}	—	August 14, 2013	Haleakala	Pan-STARRS 1	HOF	2.1 km	MPC · JPL
564388	2016 GB_{147}	—	February 5, 2016	Haleakala	Pan-STARRS 1	H	360 m	MPC · JPL
564389	2016 GH_{147}	—	August 9, 2013	Haleakala	Pan-STARRS 1	WIT	650 m	MPC · JPL
564390	2016 GS_{147}	—	September 9, 2013	Haleakala	Pan-STARRS 1	·	1.4 km	MPC · JPL
564391	2016 GX_{147}	—	October 9, 2013	Mount Lemmon	Mount Lemmon Survey	·	2.7 km	MPC · JPL
564392	2016 GO_{149}	—	December 28, 2005	Mount Lemmon	Mount Lemmon Survey	AGN	1.0 km	MPC · JPL
564393	2016 GC_{150}	—	November 1, 2013	Mount Lemmon	Mount Lemmon Survey	·	2.0 km	MPC · JPL
564394	2016 GN_{150}	—	October 19, 2003	Apache Point	SDSS Collaboration	·	1.5 km	MPC · JPL
564395	2016 GA_{154}	—	September 24, 2013	Mount Lemmon	Mount Lemmon Survey	·	1.8 km	MPC · JPL
564396	2016 GB_{154}	—	September 22, 2003	Kitt Peak	Spacewatch	·	2.1 km	MPC · JPL
564397	2016 GB_{155}	—	October 18, 2003	Kitt Peak	Spacewatch	EOS	1.7 km	MPC · JPL
564398	2016 GW_{155}	—	January 27, 2011	Mount Lemmon	Mount Lemmon Survey	·	1.6 km	MPC · JPL
564399	2016 GX_{155}	—	March 15, 2008	Mount Lemmon	Mount Lemmon Survey	·	1.3 km	MPC · JPL
564400	2016 GL_{156}	—	September 30, 2010	Mount Lemmon	Mount Lemmon Survey	·	3.2 km	MPC · JPL

== 564401–564500 ==
back to top

Designation			Discovery			Properties		Ref
Permanent	Provisional	Named after	Date	Site	Discoverer(s)	Category	Diam.	Ref
564401	2016 GM_{157}	—	February 25, 2011	Mount Lemmon	Mount Lemmon Survey	·	2.0 km	MPC · JPL
564402	2016 GV_{157}	—	April 23, 2007	Mount Lemmon	Mount Lemmon Survey	GEF	1.4 km	MPC · JPL
564403	2016 GZ_{157}	—	October 23, 2013	Mount Lemmon	Mount Lemmon Survey	·	1.6 km	MPC · JPL
564404	2016 GL_{159}	—	April 30, 2011	Mount Lemmon	Mount Lemmon Survey	EOS	1.5 km	MPC · JPL
564405	2016 GY_{160}	—	February 24, 2006	Kitt Peak	Spacewatch	·	1.8 km	MPC · JPL
564406	2016 GH_{161}	—	January 13, 2015	Haleakala	Pan-STARRS 1	·	1.6 km	MPC · JPL
564407	2016 GF_{162}	—	December 26, 2005	Mount Lemmon	Mount Lemmon Survey	·	1.5 km	MPC · JPL
564408	2016 GK_{162}	—	October 24, 2013	Mount Lemmon	Mount Lemmon Survey	EOS	1.6 km	MPC · JPL
564409	2016 GL_{162}	—	November 11, 2013	Kitt Peak	Spacewatch	·	2.2 km	MPC · JPL
564410	2016 GO_{162}	—	January 16, 2015	Haleakala	Pan-STARRS 1	·	1.8 km	MPC · JPL
564411	2016 GT_{162}	—	August 14, 2013	Haleakala	Pan-STARRS 1	·	2.0 km	MPC · JPL
564412	2016 GV_{162}	—	February 13, 2011	Mount Lemmon	Mount Lemmon Survey	·	1.6 km	MPC · JPL
564413	2016 GL_{163}	—	September 9, 2013	Haleakala	Pan-STARRS 1	·	1.7 km	MPC · JPL
564414	2016 GJ_{164}	—	March 14, 2016	Mount Lemmon	Mount Lemmon Survey	·	1.7 km	MPC · JPL
564415	2016 GY_{164}	—	October 15, 2001	Kitt Peak	Spacewatch	·	3.3 km	MPC · JPL
564416	2016 GL_{165}	—	October 3, 2013	Mount Lemmon	Mount Lemmon Survey	·	1.5 km	MPC · JPL
564417	2016 GE_{167}	—	September 6, 2013	Mount Lemmon	Mount Lemmon Survey	TRE	2.0 km	MPC · JPL
564418	2016 GF_{167}	—	September 11, 2013	Palomar	Palomar Transient Factory	GEF	1.3 km	MPC · JPL
564419	2016 GN_{167}	—	September 13, 2007	Mount Lemmon	Mount Lemmon Survey	·	2.7 km	MPC · JPL
564420	2016 GA_{168}	—	October 10, 2001	Palomar	NEAT	TIR	2.4 km	MPC · JPL
564421	2016 GR_{168}	—	November 21, 2008	Kitt Peak	Spacewatch	·	2.2 km	MPC · JPL
564422	2016 GU_{168}	—	December 11, 2014	Mount Lemmon	Mount Lemmon Survey	·	1.3 km	MPC · JPL
564423	2016 GJ_{169}	—	November 28, 2013	Mount Lemmon	Mount Lemmon Survey	·	2.5 km	MPC · JPL
564424	2016 GU_{170}	—	November 9, 2013	Kitt Peak	Spacewatch	EOS	1.5 km	MPC · JPL
564425	2016 GB_{171}	—	July 4, 1995	Kitt Peak	Spacewatch	·	3.0 km	MPC · JPL
564426	2016 GU_{172}	—	October 8, 2012	Haleakala	Pan-STARRS 1	·	2.0 km	MPC · JPL
564427	2016 GX_{172}	—	March 11, 2011	Kitt Peak	Spacewatch	HOF	2.2 km	MPC · JPL
564428	2016 GH_{173}	—	October 18, 2012	Haleakala	Pan-STARRS 1	·	2.2 km	MPC · JPL
564429	2016 GR_{173}	—	February 1, 2006	Kitt Peak	Spacewatch	·	1.3 km	MPC · JPL
564430	2016 GE_{174}	—	November 12, 2013	Mount Lemmon	Mount Lemmon Survey	EOS	1.5 km	MPC · JPL
564431	2016 GK_{174}	—	January 23, 2006	Kitt Peak	Spacewatch	·	2.2 km	MPC · JPL
564432	2016 GQ_{174}	—	May 7, 2005	Mount Lemmon	Mount Lemmon Survey	·	2.8 km	MPC · JPL
564433	2016 GV_{174}	—	March 12, 2010	Kitt Peak	Spacewatch	·	2.6 km	MPC · JPL
564434	2016 GF_{175}	—	September 17, 2012	Mount Lemmon	Mount Lemmon Survey	·	2.5 km	MPC · JPL
564435	2016 GV_{175}	—	April 15, 2007	Kitt Peak	Spacewatch	·	2.3 km	MPC · JPL
564436	2016 GE_{178}	—	October 24, 2013	Kitt Peak	Spacewatch	·	3.3 km	MPC · JPL
564437	2016 GV_{180}	—	May 2, 2006	Kitt Peak	Spacewatch	·	1.6 km	MPC · JPL
564438	2016 GG_{181}	—	September 12, 2007	Kitt Peak	Spacewatch	·	2.9 km	MPC · JPL
564439	2016 GD_{182}	—	September 9, 2008	Mount Lemmon	Mount Lemmon Survey	·	2.1 km	MPC · JPL
564440	2016 GT_{182}	—	September 4, 2007	Mount Lemmon	Mount Lemmon Survey	EOS	1.6 km	MPC · JPL
564441	2016 GU_{182}	—	May 6, 2011	Mount Lemmon	Mount Lemmon Survey	EOS	1.5 km	MPC · JPL
564442	2016 GV_{182}	—	January 13, 2015	Haleakala	Pan-STARRS 1	·	3.0 km	MPC · JPL
564443	2016 GO_{183}	—	November 28, 2013	Mount Lemmon	Mount Lemmon Survey	EOS	2.3 km	MPC · JPL
564444	2016 GZ_{184}	—	February 17, 2010	Kitt Peak	Spacewatch	EOS	1.8 km	MPC · JPL
564445	2016 GH_{185}	—	February 17, 2015	Haleakala	Pan-STARRS 1	·	1.9 km	MPC · JPL
564446	2016 GW_{185}	—	May 1, 2011	Haleakala	Pan-STARRS 1	EOS	1.7 km	MPC · JPL
564447	2016 GF_{186}	—	April 14, 2011	Mount Lemmon	Mount Lemmon Survey	·	1.9 km	MPC · JPL
564448	2016 GG_{186}	—	October 6, 2012	Haleakala	Pan-STARRS 1	TIR	3.0 km	MPC · JPL
564449	2016 GL_{186}	—	November 1, 2013	Mount Lemmon	Mount Lemmon Survey	·	1.6 km	MPC · JPL
564450	2016 GF_{187}	—	February 19, 2010	Kitt Peak	Spacewatch	·	2.3 km	MPC · JPL
564451	2016 GS_{187}	—	September 28, 2008	Mount Lemmon	Mount Lemmon Survey	AGN	990 m	MPC · JPL
564452	2016 GT_{187}	—	November 28, 2013	Mount Lemmon	Mount Lemmon Survey	·	1.8 km	MPC · JPL
564453	2016 GF_{188}	—	April 6, 2011	Mount Lemmon	Mount Lemmon Survey	·	2.1 km	MPC · JPL
564454	2016 GW_{188}	—	December 30, 2014	Haleakala	Pan-STARRS 1	·	3.0 km	MPC · JPL
564455	2016 GF_{189}	—	January 20, 2015	Haleakala	Pan-STARRS 1	EMA	2.5 km	MPC · JPL
564456	2016 GC_{190}	—	April 27, 2006	Catalina	CSS	H	390 m	MPC · JPL
564457	2016 GY_{190}	—	October 26, 2013	Mount Lemmon	Mount Lemmon Survey	·	3.3 km	MPC · JPL
564458	2016 GZ_{190}	—	January 20, 2009	Mount Lemmon	Mount Lemmon Survey	·	3.0 km	MPC · JPL
564459	2016 GZ_{191}	—	February 16, 2015	Haleakala	Pan-STARRS 1	·	2.5 km	MPC · JPL
564460	2016 GT_{192}	—	January 2, 2009	Kitt Peak	Spacewatch	·	2.0 km	MPC · JPL
564461	2016 GE_{194}	—	January 5, 2006	Kitt Peak	Spacewatch	·	1.4 km	MPC · JPL
564462	2016 GS_{195}	—	November 10, 2009	Kitt Peak	Spacewatch	·	2.0 km	MPC · JPL
564463	2016 GR_{196}	—	January 23, 2006	Kitt Peak	Spacewatch	AGN	1.2 km	MPC · JPL
564464	2016 GX_{196}	—	November 23, 2014	Haleakala	Pan-STARRS 1	·	1.3 km	MPC · JPL
564465	2016 GN_{197}	—	September 7, 2008	Mount Lemmon	Mount Lemmon Survey	·	1.5 km	MPC · JPL
564466	2016 GO_{198}	—	October 11, 2007	Mount Lemmon	Mount Lemmon Survey	TIR	2.5 km	MPC · JPL
564467	2016 GY_{199}	—	September 19, 2003	Palomar	NEAT	·	1.9 km	MPC · JPL
564468	2016 GJ_{201}	—	September 14, 2013	Haleakala	Pan-STARRS 1	·	2.6 km	MPC · JPL
564469	2016 GQ_{201}	—	December 26, 2014	Haleakala	Pan-STARRS 1	EOS	1.5 km	MPC · JPL
564470	2016 GR_{202}	—	November 26, 2014	Haleakala	Pan-STARRS 1	·	1.7 km	MPC · JPL
564471	2016 GT_{203}	—	March 27, 2011	Mount Lemmon	Mount Lemmon Survey	·	1.9 km	MPC · JPL
564472	2016 GF_{204}	—	April 4, 2016	Kitt Peak	Spacewatch	·	1.7 km	MPC · JPL
564473	2016 GG_{205}	—	May 12, 2003	Haleakala	NEAT	·	2.8 km	MPC · JPL
564474	2016 GZ_{205}	—	November 28, 1994	Kitt Peak	Spacewatch	·	2.5 km	MPC · JPL
564475	2016 GM_{207}	—	December 10, 2014	Mount Lemmon	Mount Lemmon Survey	·	2.0 km	MPC · JPL
564476	2016 GA_{209}	—	August 15, 2013	Haleakala	Pan-STARRS 1	AGN	950 m	MPC · JPL
564477	2016 GB_{209}	—	March 11, 2007	Kitt Peak	Spacewatch	·	1.4 km	MPC · JPL
564478	2016 GH_{209}	—	October 8, 2008	Kitt Peak	Spacewatch	·	1.4 km	MPC · JPL
564479	2016 GZ_{209}	—	September 25, 2000	Kitt Peak	Spacewatch	·	1.4 km	MPC · JPL
564480	2016 GE_{210}	—	November 21, 2014	Haleakala	Pan-STARRS 1	·	2.9 km	MPC · JPL
564481	2016 GF_{210}	—	April 5, 2011	Mount Lemmon	Mount Lemmon Survey	·	1.8 km	MPC · JPL
564482	2016 GY_{212}	—	March 4, 2016	Haleakala	Pan-STARRS 1	BRA	1.4 km	MPC · JPL
564483	2016 GA_{213}	—	March 30, 2008	Kitt Peak	Spacewatch	·	1.1 km	MPC · JPL
564484	2016 GH_{213}	—	February 20, 2006	Kitt Peak	Spacewatch	KOR	1.1 km	MPC · JPL
564485	2016 GR_{213}	—	September 11, 2007	Mount Lemmon	Mount Lemmon Survey	VER	2.8 km	MPC · JPL
564486	2016 GW_{213}	—	September 6, 2013	Kitt Peak	Spacewatch	EOS	1.9 km	MPC · JPL
564487	2016 GX_{213}	—	December 2, 2008	Kitt Peak	Spacewatch	·	1.8 km	MPC · JPL
564488	2016 GX_{214}	—	January 15, 2010	Kitt Peak	Spacewatch	·	3.0 km	MPC · JPL
564489	2016 GF_{215}	—	August 16, 2006	Siding Spring	SSS	TIR	3.0 km	MPC · JPL
564490	2016 GM_{215}	—	January 11, 2010	Kitt Peak	Spacewatch	·	2.8 km	MPC · JPL
564491	2016 GG_{217}	—	January 24, 2011	Kitt Peak	Spacewatch	·	1.6 km	MPC · JPL
564492	2016 GH_{217}	—	December 12, 2004	Kitt Peak	Spacewatch	·	1.9 km	MPC · JPL
564493	2016 GM_{217}	—	November 26, 2014	Haleakala	Pan-STARRS 1	·	2.5 km	MPC · JPL
564494	2016 GX_{217}	—	September 15, 2007	Mount Lemmon	Mount Lemmon Survey	·	2.6 km	MPC · JPL
564495	2016 GB_{218}	—	April 24, 2011	Kitt Peak	Spacewatch	·	3.2 km	MPC · JPL
564496	2016 GA_{220}	—	September 13, 2012	Kislovodsk	ISON-Kislovodsk Observatory	·	4.6 km	MPC · JPL
564497	2016 GM_{222}	—	September 22, 2008	Mount Lemmon	Mount Lemmon Survey	·	1.9 km	MPC · JPL
564498	2016 GO_{222}	—	September 30, 1995	Kitt Peak	Spacewatch	·	2.6 km	MPC · JPL
564499	2016 GX_{222}	—	February 3, 2009	Mount Lemmon	Mount Lemmon Survey	EOS	1.9 km	MPC · JPL
564500	2016 GA_{223}	—	October 30, 2013	Haleakala	Pan-STARRS 1	EOS	1.8 km	MPC · JPL

== 564501–564600 ==
back to top

Designation			Discovery			Properties		Ref
Permanent	Provisional	Named after	Date	Site	Discoverer(s)	Category	Diam.	Ref
564501	2016 GF_{223}	—	September 16, 2012	Mount Lemmon	Mount Lemmon Survey	EOS	1.9 km	MPC · JPL
564502	2016 GZ_{224}	—	June 4, 2011	Mount Lemmon	Mount Lemmon Survey	EOS	1.7 km	MPC · JPL
564503	2016 GE_{226}	—	September 16, 2003	Kitt Peak	Spacewatch	·	590 m	MPC · JPL
564504	2016 GM_{227}	—	February 10, 2016	Haleakala	Pan-STARRS 1	·	2.0 km	MPC · JPL
564505	2016 GF_{228}	—	March 15, 2005	Mount Lemmon	Mount Lemmon Survey	·	2.7 km	MPC · JPL
564506	2016 GN_{229}	—	March 26, 2011	Kitt Peak	Spacewatch	·	1.6 km	MPC · JPL
564507	2016 GP_{229}	—	September 14, 2013	Mount Lemmon	Mount Lemmon Survey	·	2.4 km	MPC · JPL
564508	2016 GS_{229}	—	September 9, 2013	Haleakala	Pan-STARRS 1	·	1.8 km	MPC · JPL
564509	2016 GH_{230}	—	February 10, 2011	Mount Lemmon	Mount Lemmon Survey	·	2.5 km	MPC · JPL
564510	2016 GH_{231}	—	September 13, 2007	Mount Lemmon	Mount Lemmon Survey	·	2.6 km	MPC · JPL
564511	2016 GW_{234}	—	November 26, 2013	Haleakala	Pan-STARRS 1	EOS	1.4 km	MPC · JPL
564512	2016 GE_{235}	—	January 17, 2015	Haleakala	Pan-STARRS 1	·	3.3 km	MPC · JPL
564513	2016 GD_{236}	—	December 22, 2008	Kitt Peak	Spacewatch	EOS	1.8 km	MPC · JPL
564514	2016 GK_{236}	—	April 14, 2016	Mount Lemmon	Mount Lemmon Survey	EOS	1.4 km	MPC · JPL
564515	2016 GS_{236}	—	November 28, 2013	Mount Lemmon	Mount Lemmon Survey	·	2.9 km	MPC · JPL
564516	2016 GL_{237}	—	October 30, 2014	Haleakala	Pan-STARRS 1	H	410 m	MPC · JPL
564517	2016 GW_{237}	—	December 16, 2007	Kitt Peak	Spacewatch	·	2.9 km	MPC · JPL
564518	2016 GZ_{238}	—	December 27, 2014	Haleakala	Pan-STARRS 1	·	3.3 km	MPC · JPL
564519	2016 GU_{240}	—	February 17, 2010	Mount Lemmon	Mount Lemmon Survey	·	2.2 km	MPC · JPL
564520	2016 GL_{242}	—	March 4, 2016	Haleakala	Pan-STARRS 1	·	490 m	MPC · JPL
564521	2016 GT_{242}	—	March 15, 2007	Mount Lemmon	Mount Lemmon Survey	·	1.6 km	MPC · JPL
564522	2016 GL_{243}	—	October 5, 2002	Palomar	NEAT	·	2.9 km	MPC · JPL
564523	2016 GG_{244}	—	November 10, 2009	Kitt Peak	Spacewatch	·	1.9 km	MPC · JPL
564524	2016 GG_{245}	—	March 4, 2016	Haleakala	Pan-STARRS 1	·	1.5 km	MPC · JPL
564525	2016 GH_{245}	—	January 17, 2005	Kitt Peak	Spacewatch	·	1.5 km	MPC · JPL
564526	2016 GK_{245}	—	March 31, 2008	Kitt Peak	Spacewatch	·	1.2 km	MPC · JPL
564527	2016 GA_{248}	—	November 28, 2014	Kitt Peak	Spacewatch	·	1.9 km	MPC · JPL
564528	2016 GG_{248}	—	March 4, 2005	Kitt Peak	Spacewatch	·	2.4 km	MPC · JPL
564529	2016 GO_{248}	—	September 7, 2004	Kitt Peak	Spacewatch	·	1.9 km	MPC · JPL
564530	2016 GK_{249}	—	March 26, 2006	Mount Lemmon	Mount Lemmon Survey	·	1.9 km	MPC · JPL
564531	2016 GM_{249}	—	February 11, 2016	Haleakala	Pan-STARRS 1	·	2.7 km	MPC · JPL
564532	2016 GX_{249}	—	September 24, 2008	Mount Lemmon	Mount Lemmon Survey	KOR	1.3 km	MPC · JPL
564533	2016 GP_{250}	—	October 23, 2003	Kitt Peak	Spacewatch	·	1.8 km	MPC · JPL
564534	2016 GU_{250}	—	March 12, 2005	Kitt Peak	Spacewatch	·	3.0 km	MPC · JPL
564535	2016 GQ_{251}	—	April 9, 2010	Mount Lemmon	Mount Lemmon Survey	·	3.2 km	MPC · JPL
564536	2016 GH_{252}	—	October 2, 2014	Haleakala	Pan-STARRS 1	H	390 m	MPC · JPL
564537	2016 GK_{252}	—	May 5, 2008	Mount Lemmon	Mount Lemmon Survey	H	440 m	MPC · JPL
564538	2016 GQ_{252}	—	March 12, 2013	Palomar	Palomar Transient Factory	H	560 m	MPC · JPL
564539	2016 GR_{252}	—	July 27, 2011	Haleakala	Pan-STARRS 1	H	380 m	MPC · JPL
564540	2016 GF_{253}	—	October 12, 2006	Kitt Peak	Spacewatch	H	310 m	MPC · JPL
564541	2016 GQ_{254}	—	December 22, 2005	Kitt Peak	Spacewatch	AGN	1.2 km	MPC · JPL
564542	2016 GC_{257}	—	April 4, 2016	Haleakala	Pan-STARRS 1	·	1.4 km	MPC · JPL
564543	2016 GD_{257}	—	April 4, 2016	Haleakala	Pan-STARRS 1	·	1.5 km	MPC · JPL
564544	2016 GQ_{257}	—	April 8, 2006	Kitt Peak	Spacewatch	·	1.6 km	MPC · JPL
564545	2016 GH_{258}	—	January 21, 2015	Haleakala	Pan-STARRS 1	·	1.5 km	MPC · JPL
564546	2016 GL_{258}	—	March 15, 2015	Haleakala	Pan-STARRS 1	·	1.6 km	MPC · JPL
564547	2016 GZ_{258}	—	April 27, 2012	Haleakala	Pan-STARRS 1	·	860 m	MPC · JPL
564548	2016 GP_{259}	—	October 27, 2008	Mount Lemmon	Mount Lemmon Survey	·	1.7 km	MPC · JPL
564549	2016 GT_{259}	—	March 5, 2006	Mount Lemmon	Mount Lemmon Survey	KOR	1.2 km	MPC · JPL
564550	2016 GZ_{259}	—	April 5, 2016	Haleakala	Pan-STARRS 1	·	2.2 km	MPC · JPL
564551	2016 GP_{260}	—	November 26, 2014	Haleakala	Pan-STARRS 1	·	1.7 km	MPC · JPL
564552	2016 GQ_{260}	—	December 19, 2009	Mount Lemmon	Mount Lemmon Survey	·	2.0 km	MPC · JPL
564553	2016 GR_{260}	—	December 18, 2009	Mount Lemmon	Mount Lemmon Survey	·	1.8 km	MPC · JPL
564554	2016 GJ_{261}	—	April 1, 2016	Haleakala	Pan-STARRS 1	EOS	1.6 km	MPC · JPL
564555	2016 GK_{262}	—	January 7, 2010	Kitt Peak	Spacewatch	·	1.6 km	MPC · JPL
564556	2016 GD_{264}	—	January 8, 2010	Kitt Peak	Spacewatch	·	2.3 km	MPC · JPL
564557	2016 GQ_{265}	—	January 23, 2015	Haleakala	Pan-STARRS 1	·	2.7 km	MPC · JPL
564558	2016 GU_{265}	—	November 27, 2014	Haleakala	Pan-STARRS 1	·	1.4 km	MPC · JPL
564559	2016 GZ_{265}	—	February 16, 2004	Kitt Peak	Spacewatch	·	2.3 km	MPC · JPL
564560	2016 GE_{266}	—	February 10, 2015	Mount Lemmon	Mount Lemmon Survey	EOS	1.4 km	MPC · JPL
564561	2016 GF_{266}	—	March 11, 2015	Mount Lemmon	Mount Lemmon Survey	EOS	1.8 km	MPC · JPL
564562	2016 GJ_{266}	—	April 11, 2016	Haleakala	Pan-STARRS 1	·	2.2 km	MPC · JPL
564563	2016 GM_{266}	—	April 11, 2016	Haleakala	Pan-STARRS 1	·	1.5 km	MPC · JPL
564564	2016 GN_{266}	—	February 20, 2015	Haleakala	Pan-STARRS 1	·	3.0 km	MPC · JPL
564565	2016 GS_{266}	—	September 13, 2007	Mount Lemmon	Mount Lemmon Survey	·	1.8 km	MPC · JPL
564566	2016 GT_{267}	—	October 27, 2013	Kitt Peak	Spacewatch	·	1.8 km	MPC · JPL
564567	2016 GU_{267}	—	February 18, 2015	Mount Lemmon	Mount Lemmon Survey	EOS	1.6 km	MPC · JPL
564568	2016 GY_{268}	—	July 25, 2011	Haleakala	Pan-STARRS 1	·	2.6 km	MPC · JPL
564569	2016 GD_{277}	—	April 11, 2016	Haleakala	Pan-STARRS 1	·	2.5 km	MPC · JPL
564570	2016 GP_{277}	—	April 5, 2016	Haleakala	Pan-STARRS 1	·	2.5 km	MPC · JPL
564571	2016 GG_{278}	—	April 11, 2016	Haleakala	Pan-STARRS 1	EOS	1.5 km	MPC · JPL
564572	2016 GQ_{278}	—	April 5, 2016	Haleakala	Pan-STARRS 1	·	1.6 km	MPC · JPL
564573	2016 GA_{285}	—	April 1, 2016	Haleakala	Pan-STARRS 1	AGN	950 m	MPC · JPL
564574	2016 GJ_{295}	—	January 17, 2015	Mount Lemmon	Mount Lemmon Survey	·	970 m	MPC · JPL
564575	2016 HH	—	June 9, 2014	Mount Lemmon	Mount Lemmon Survey	H	460 m	MPC · JPL
564576	2016 HK_{2}	—	December 17, 2007	Mount Lemmon	Mount Lemmon Survey	H	500 m	MPC · JPL
564577	2016 HB_{3}	—	November 10, 2009	Cerro Burek	Burek, Cerro	H	470 m	MPC · JPL
564578	2016 HK_{4}	—	August 20, 2001	Cerro Tololo	Deep Ecliptic Survey	THM	2.1 km	MPC · JPL
564579	2016 HR_{4}	—	September 10, 2007	Mount Lemmon	Mount Lemmon Survey	·	1.7 km	MPC · JPL
564580	2016 HU_{4}	—	January 11, 2010	Mount Lemmon	Mount Lemmon Survey	·	1.9 km	MPC · JPL
564581	2016 HV_{4}	—	September 21, 2003	Kitt Peak	Spacewatch	KOR	1.3 km	MPC · JPL
564582	2016 HB_{5}	—	October 12, 2007	Mount Lemmon	Mount Lemmon Survey	T_{j} (2.99) · EUP	4.5 km	MPC · JPL
564583	2016 HD_{5}	—	November 8, 2008	Mount Lemmon	Mount Lemmon Survey	·	2.5 km	MPC · JPL
564584	2016 HH_{5}	—	March 2, 2011	Kitt Peak	Spacewatch	HOF	2.2 km	MPC · JPL
564585	2016 HC_{6}	—	August 13, 2012	Kitt Peak	Spacewatch	·	1.7 km	MPC · JPL
564586	2016 HL_{6}	—	March 31, 2016	Haleakala	Pan-STARRS 1	·	1.9 km	MPC · JPL
564587	2016 HE_{9}	—	October 9, 2010	Mount Lemmon	Mount Lemmon Survey	V	440 m	MPC · JPL
564588	2016 HO_{9}	—	January 17, 2015	Haleakala	Pan-STARRS 1	·	1.5 km	MPC · JPL
564589	2016 HJ_{10}	—	April 2, 2011	Mount Lemmon	Mount Lemmon Survey	·	1.5 km	MPC · JPL
564590	2016 HB_{11}	—	October 29, 2014	Haleakala	Pan-STARRS 1	HNS	1 km	MPC · JPL
564591	2016 HJ_{12}	—	October 3, 2013	Mount Lemmon	Mount Lemmon Survey	KOR	1.0 km	MPC · JPL
564592	2016 HE_{13}	—	September 20, 2008	Mount Lemmon	Mount Lemmon Survey	KOR	1.4 km	MPC · JPL
564593	2016 HM_{13}	—	May 24, 2001	Cerro Tololo	Deep Ecliptic Survey	·	2.2 km	MPC · JPL
564594	2016 HB_{14}	—	December 21, 2014	Haleakala	Pan-STARRS 1	KOR	950 m	MPC · JPL
564595	2016 HO_{14}	—	April 1, 2005	Kitt Peak	Spacewatch	EOS	1.7 km	MPC · JPL
564596	2016 HD_{16}	—	November 11, 2013	Kitt Peak	Spacewatch	·	2.6 km	MPC · JPL
564597	2016 HA_{17}	—	October 15, 2007	Mount Lemmon	Mount Lemmon Survey	·	2.8 km	MPC · JPL
564598	2016 HF_{17}	—	January 15, 2015	Haleakala	Pan-STARRS 1	·	1.7 km	MPC · JPL
564599	2016 HT_{17}	—	July 21, 2012	Charleston	R. Holmes	·	2.5 km	MPC · JPL
564600	2016 HJ_{20}	—	November 21, 2014	Haleakala	Pan-STARRS 1	·	2.3 km	MPC · JPL

== 564601–564700 ==
back to top

Designation			Discovery			Properties		Ref
Permanent	Provisional	Named after	Date	Site	Discoverer(s)	Category	Diam.	Ref
564601	2016 HZ_{20}	—	October 26, 2014	Haleakala	Pan-STARRS 1	·	2.4 km	MPC · JPL
564602	2016 HF_{22}	—	September 23, 2008	Kitt Peak	Spacewatch	·	2.0 km	MPC · JPL
564603	2016 HR_{23}	—	September 12, 2007	Mount Lemmon	Mount Lemmon Survey	·	2.3 km	MPC · JPL
564604	2016 HS_{24}	—	January 22, 2015	Haleakala	Pan-STARRS 1	THM	2.0 km	MPC · JPL
564605	2016 HT_{24}	—	April 16, 2016	Haleakala	Pan-STARRS 1	THM	2.0 km	MPC · JPL
564606	2016 HG_{25}	—	March 31, 2016	Haleakala	Pan-STARRS 1	TIR	2.1 km	MPC · JPL
564607	2016 HK_{28}	—	April 29, 2016	Mount Lemmon	Mount Lemmon Survey	·	1.9 km	MPC · JPL
564608	2016 HY_{31}	—	April 29, 2016	Haleakala	Pan-STARRS 1	·	3.0 km	MPC · JPL
564609	2016 JJ_{1}	—	October 27, 2008	Kitt Peak	Spacewatch	EOS	1.7 km	MPC · JPL
564610	2016 JH_{5}	—	June 15, 2009	Kitt Peak	Spacewatch	H	380 m	MPC · JPL
564611	2016 JL_{5}	—	June 1, 2014	Haleakala	Pan-STARRS 1	H	440 m	MPC · JPL
564612	2016 JJ_{6}	—	August 31, 1995	Kitt Peak	Spacewatch	H	540 m	MPC · JPL
564613	2016 JU_{7}	—	April 24, 2008	Mount Lemmon	Mount Lemmon Survey	H	510 m	MPC · JPL
564614	2016 JC_{8}	—	March 28, 2009	Catalina	CSS	·	5.0 km	MPC · JPL
564615	2016 JG_{8}	—	May 22, 2006	Kitt Peak	Spacewatch	EOS	1.5 km	MPC · JPL
564616	2016 JF_{10}	—	October 7, 2012	Haleakala	Pan-STARRS 1	·	2.9 km	MPC · JPL
564617	2016 JH_{11}	—	March 18, 2010	Mount Lemmon	Mount Lemmon Survey	EOS	1.7 km	MPC · JPL
564618	2016 JL_{11}	—	January 20, 2009	Kitt Peak	Spacewatch	·	2.8 km	MPC · JPL
564619	2016 JC_{12}	—	August 17, 2009	Kitt Peak	Spacewatch	H	400 m	MPC · JPL
564620	2016 JV_{12}	—	October 24, 2014	Mount Lemmon	Mount Lemmon Survey	·	2.9 km	MPC · JPL
564621	2016 JW_{14}	—	August 18, 2006	Kitt Peak	Spacewatch	ELF	2.9 km	MPC · JPL
564622	2016 JJ_{16}	—	November 10, 2013	Kitt Peak	Spacewatch	·	2.6 km	MPC · JPL
564623	2016 JN_{16}	—	January 20, 2015	Mount Lemmon	Mount Lemmon Survey	·	2.5 km	MPC · JPL
564624	2016 JV_{16}	—	August 16, 2012	ESA OGS	ESA OGS	·	1.4 km	MPC · JPL
564625	2016 JA_{18}	—	May 4, 2016	Mount Lemmon	Mount Lemmon Survey	H	500 m	MPC · JPL
564626	2016 JL_{18}	—	May 4, 2016	Haleakala	Pan-STARRS 1	H	440 m	MPC · JPL
564627	2016 JQ_{18}	—	December 9, 2014	Haleakala	Pan-STARRS 1	H	410 m	MPC · JPL
564628	2016 JD_{19}	—	January 18, 2015	Mount Lemmon	Mount Lemmon Survey	·	1.7 km	MPC · JPL
564629	2016 JE_{21}	—	June 4, 2011	Mount Lemmon	Mount Lemmon Survey	·	3.2 km	MPC · JPL
564630	2016 JG_{21}	—	December 2, 2005	Kitt Peak	L. H. Wasserman, R. L. Millis	KOR	1.4 km	MPC · JPL
564631	2016 JS_{22}	—	October 19, 2007	Kitt Peak	Spacewatch	·	3.0 km	MPC · JPL
564632	2016 JA_{24}	—	May 2, 2011	Kitt Peak	Spacewatch	·	1.9 km	MPC · JPL
564633	2016 JV_{26}	—	November 11, 2009	Mount Lemmon	Mount Lemmon Survey	H	430 m	MPC · JPL
564634	2016 JW_{26}	—	April 30, 2005	Kitt Peak	Spacewatch	·	2.3 km	MPC · JPL
564635	2016 JC_{27}	—	October 7, 2008	Mount Lemmon	Mount Lemmon Survey	·	1.9 km	MPC · JPL
564636	2016 JN_{27}	—	January 24, 2015	Mount Lemmon	Mount Lemmon Survey	·	1.6 km	MPC · JPL
564637	2016 JD_{30}	—	October 21, 2003	Kitt Peak	Spacewatch	·	2.2 km	MPC · JPL
564638	2016 JL_{30}	—	November 2, 2013	Mount Lemmon	Mount Lemmon Survey	·	3.4 km	MPC · JPL
564639	2016 JQ_{31}	—	October 27, 2009	Mount Lemmon	Mount Lemmon Survey	H	530 m	MPC · JPL
564640	2016 JK_{32}	—	November 30, 2008	Vail-Jarnac	Jarnac	·	4.1 km	MPC · JPL
564641	2016 JJ_{34}	—	November 30, 2009	Cerro Burek	Burek, Cerro	H	450 m	MPC · JPL
564642	2016 JW_{34}	—	August 25, 2012	Haleakala	Pan-STARRS 1	·	1.9 km	MPC · JPL
564643	2016 JJ_{35}	—	March 31, 2003	Palomar	NEAT	·	1.9 km	MPC · JPL
564644	2016 JQ_{35}	—	October 8, 2008	Kitt Peak	Spacewatch	·	1.7 km	MPC · JPL
564645	2016 JN_{36}	—	April 1, 2005	Anderson Mesa	LONEOS	·	2.4 km	MPC · JPL
564646	2016 JY_{36}	—	February 5, 2002	Anderson Mesa	LONEOS	H	680 m	MPC · JPL
564647	2016 JG_{37}	—	December 26, 2014	Haleakala	Pan-STARRS 1	·	3.1 km	MPC · JPL
564648	2016 JW_{38}	—	May 2, 2016	Haleakala	Pan-STARRS 1	·	2.8 km	MPC · JPL
564649	2016 JX_{38}	—	January 21, 2013	Haleakala	Pan-STARRS 1	H	510 m	MPC · JPL
564650	2016 JY_{38}	—	March 17, 2005	Catalina	CSS	H	560 m	MPC · JPL
564651	2016 JC_{39}	—	April 6, 2008	Kitt Peak	Spacewatch	H	390 m	MPC · JPL
564652	2016 JQ_{39}	—	July 20, 2011	Haleakala	Pan-STARRS 1	H	370 m	MPC · JPL
564653	2016 JV_{39}	—	June 25, 2011	Mount Lemmon	Mount Lemmon Survey	·	2.0 km	MPC · JPL
564654	2016 JK_{40}	—	July 24, 2000	Kitt Peak	Spacewatch	·	3.5 km	MPC · JPL
564655	2016 JS_{40}	—	December 21, 2008	Mount Lemmon	Mount Lemmon Survey	·	2.4 km	MPC · JPL
564656	2016 JU_{40}	—	April 6, 2010	Bergisch Gladbach	W. Bickel	·	2.9 km	MPC · JPL
564657	2016 JA_{41}	—	September 27, 2003	Kitt Peak	Spacewatch	·	2.1 km	MPC · JPL
564658	2016 JD_{41}	—	January 29, 2015	Haleakala	Pan-STARRS 1	·	2.5 km	MPC · JPL
564659	2016 JS_{41}	—	July 1, 2011	Kitt Peak	Spacewatch	TIR	1.9 km	MPC · JPL
564660	2016 JE_{45}	—	May 6, 2016	Haleakala	Pan-STARRS 1	URS	2.9 km	MPC · JPL
564661	2016 JL_{45}	—	May 3, 2016	Mount Lemmon	Mount Lemmon Survey	·	500 m	MPC · JPL
564662	2016 KX	—	October 27, 2006	Catalina	CSS	H	510 m	MPC · JPL
564663	2016 KC_{1}	—	September 19, 2014	Haleakala	Pan-STARRS 1	·	1.9 km	MPC · JPL
564664	2016 KH_{2}	—	April 6, 2005	Catalina	CSS	·	2.7 km	MPC · JPL
564665	2016 KA_{4}	—	July 13, 2001	Palomar	NEAT	·	3.7 km	MPC · JPL
564666	2016 KM_{4}	—	June 7, 2013	Mount Lemmon	Mount Lemmon Survey	H	490 m	MPC · JPL
564667	2016 KY_{4}	—	April 2, 2005	Mount Lemmon	Mount Lemmon Survey	·	1.8 km	MPC · JPL
564668	2016 KZ_{4}	—	July 19, 2011	Haleakala	Pan-STARRS 1	·	1.8 km	MPC · JPL
564669	2016 KP_{5}	—	August 29, 2005	Palomar	NEAT	·	2.6 km	MPC · JPL
564670	2016 KY_{5}	—	January 23, 2015	Haleakala	Pan-STARRS 1	·	1.7 km	MPC · JPL
564671	2016 KE_{7}	—	February 18, 2015	Mount Lemmon	Mount Lemmon Survey	·	2.1 km	MPC · JPL
564672	2016 KC_{8}	—	April 8, 2010	Kitt Peak	Spacewatch	·	2.6 km	MPC · JPL
564673	2016 KP_{8}	—	September 21, 2012	Mount Lemmon	Mount Lemmon Survey	·	1.8 km	MPC · JPL
564674	2016 KQ_{8}	—	December 22, 2008	Mount Lemmon	Mount Lemmon Survey	·	2.3 km	MPC · JPL
564675	2016 KX_{8}	—	January 29, 2009	Mount Lemmon	Mount Lemmon Survey	VER	2.2 km	MPC · JPL
564676	2016 KD_{9}	—	December 31, 2013	Kitt Peak	Spacewatch	·	3.0 km	MPC · JPL
564677	2016 KH_{9}	—	October 19, 2006	Kitt Peak	Deep Ecliptic Survey	·	2.3 km	MPC · JPL
564678	2016 KX_{10}	—	May 27, 2016	Haleakala	Pan-STARRS 1	H	530 m	MPC · JPL
564679	2016 LY	—	August 30, 2014	Haleakala	Pan-STARRS 1	H	540 m	MPC · JPL
564680	2016 LD_{1}	—	December 27, 2006	Mount Lemmon	Mount Lemmon Survey	H	560 m	MPC · JPL
564681	2016 LV_{1}	—	July 28, 2011	Haleakala	Pan-STARRS 1	H	450 m	MPC · JPL
564682	2016 LV_{3}	—	July 6, 2014	Haleakala	Pan-STARRS 1	H	380 m	MPC · JPL
564683	2016 LV_{4}	—	August 30, 2014	Haleakala	Pan-STARRS 1	H	490 m	MPC · JPL
564684	2016 LD_{5}	—	March 18, 2015	Haleakala	Pan-STARRS 1	·	2.9 km	MPC · JPL
564685	2016 LH_{5}	—	January 20, 2015	Haleakala	Pan-STARRS 1	·	2.2 km	MPC · JPL
564686	2016 LR_{5}	—	May 9, 2010	Charleston	R. Holmes	·	2.3 km	MPC · JPL
564687	2016 LC_{7}	—	October 9, 2012	Nogales	M. Schwartz, P. R. Holvorcem	·	2.4 km	MPC · JPL
564688	2016 LN_{7}	—	March 17, 2005	Kitt Peak	Spacewatch	·	770 m	MPC · JPL
564689	2016 LS_{8}	—	June 3, 2016	Mount Lemmon	Mount Lemmon Survey	H	370 m	MPC · JPL
564690	2016 LO_{9}	—	February 7, 2013	Catalina	CSS	H	450 m	MPC · JPL
564691	2016 LB_{10}	—	November 26, 2014	Catalina	CSS	H	420 m	MPC · JPL
564692	2016 LZ_{11}	—	March 4, 2005	Kitt Peak	Spacewatch	H	360 m	MPC · JPL
564693	2016 LK_{12}	—	November 2, 2007	Mount Lemmon	Mount Lemmon Survey	·	1.7 km	MPC · JPL
564694	2016 LU_{12}	—	September 17, 2012	Mount Lemmon	Mount Lemmon Survey	·	1.7 km	MPC · JPL
564695	2016 LN_{13}	—	October 26, 2012	Mount Lemmon	Mount Lemmon Survey	·	3.2 km	MPC · JPL
564696	2016 LZ_{13}	—	February 16, 2015	Haleakala	Pan-STARRS 1	·	1.7 km	MPC · JPL
564697	2016 LG_{14}	—	April 15, 2016	Haleakala	Pan-STARRS 1	·	1.8 km	MPC · JPL
564698	2016 LY_{14}	—	April 20, 2010	Mount Lemmon	Mount Lemmon Survey	·	3.0 km	MPC · JPL
564699	2016 LZ_{15}	—	January 16, 2015	Haleakala	Pan-STARRS 1	·	2.3 km	MPC · JPL
564700	2016 LD_{16}	—	January 1, 2009	Kitt Peak	Spacewatch	EOS	1.8 km	MPC · JPL

== 564701–564800 ==
back to top

Designation			Discovery			Properties		Ref
Permanent	Provisional	Named after	Date	Site	Discoverer(s)	Category	Diam.	Ref
564701	2016 LE_{16}	—	January 29, 2003	Apache Point	SDSS Collaboration	EOS	1.6 km	MPC · JPL
564702	2016 LQ_{16}	—	August 17, 2012	Siding Spring	SSS	TIN	890 m	MPC · JPL
564703	2016 LW_{16}	—	June 5, 2016	Haleakala	Pan-STARRS 1	·	2.0 km	MPC · JPL
564704	2016 LX_{16}	—	January 3, 2009	Mount Lemmon	Mount Lemmon Survey	·	2.7 km	MPC · JPL
564705	2016 LL_{17}	—	April 11, 2010	Vail-Jarnac	Jarnac	TIR	3.1 km	MPC · JPL
564706	2016 LJ_{18}	—	June 5, 2016	Haleakala	Pan-STARRS 1	·	2.7 km	MPC · JPL
564707	2016 LD_{19}	—	February 16, 2015	Haleakala	Pan-STARRS 1	EOS	1.6 km	MPC · JPL
564708	2016 LN_{19}	—	February 16, 2015	Haleakala	Pan-STARRS 1	·	2.4 km	MPC · JPL
564709	2016 LS_{19}	—	January 20, 2010	WISE	WISE	·	2.5 km	MPC · JPL
564710	2016 LA_{20}	—	September 13, 2012	Mount Lemmon	Mount Lemmon Survey	EOS	1.7 km	MPC · JPL
564711	2016 LC_{21}	—	January 17, 2015	Haleakala	Pan-STARRS 1	·	2.2 km	MPC · JPL
564712	2016 LD_{21}	—	September 10, 2007	Kitt Peak	Spacewatch	·	2.2 km	MPC · JPL
564713	2016 LP_{21}	—	December 5, 2007	Mount Lemmon	Mount Lemmon Survey	·	3.1 km	MPC · JPL
564714	2016 LG_{22}	—	October 10, 2007	Kitt Peak	Spacewatch	·	2.7 km	MPC · JPL
564715	2016 LD_{23}	—	January 2, 2009	Kitt Peak	Spacewatch	EOS	1.6 km	MPC · JPL
564716	2016 LE_{23}	—	February 15, 2010	Kitt Peak	Spacewatch	EOS	1.4 km	MPC · JPL
564717	2016 LG_{23}	—	February 17, 2010	Catalina	CSS	·	2.1 km	MPC · JPL
564718	2016 LH_{23}	—	May 30, 2016	Haleakala	Pan-STARRS 1	·	1.8 km	MPC · JPL
564719	2016 LT_{23}	—	December 2, 2008	Mount Lemmon	Mount Lemmon Survey	·	2.5 km	MPC · JPL
564720	2016 LD_{25}	—	February 16, 2015	Haleakala	Pan-STARRS 1	·	2.3 km	MPC · JPL
564721	2016 LO_{28}	—	August 26, 2012	Haleakala	Pan-STARRS 1	·	2.5 km	MPC · JPL
564722	2016 LF_{29}	—	April 15, 2016	Haleakala	Pan-STARRS 1	·	1.3 km	MPC · JPL
564723	2016 LZ_{29}	—	March 4, 2011	Bergisch Gladbach	W. Bickel	·	2.7 km	MPC · JPL
564724	2016 LJ_{32}	—	February 17, 2015	Haleakala	Pan-STARRS 1	·	2.4 km	MPC · JPL
564725	2016 LN_{32}	—	July 25, 2011	Haleakala	Pan-STARRS 1	·	2.1 km	MPC · JPL
564726	2016 LV_{32}	—	September 22, 2012	Mount Lemmon	Mount Lemmon Survey	·	1.8 km	MPC · JPL
564727	2016 LD_{34}	—	May 25, 2006	Kitt Peak	Spacewatch	·	1.5 km	MPC · JPL
564728	2016 LA_{36}	—	September 17, 2012	Mount Lemmon	Mount Lemmon Survey	·	2.4 km	MPC · JPL
564729	2016 LM_{36}	—	September 12, 2001	Kitt Peak	Deep Ecliptic Survey	EOS	1.5 km	MPC · JPL
564730	2016 LJ_{40}	—	May 30, 2016	Haleakala	Pan-STARRS 1	(18466)	1.9 km	MPC · JPL
564731	2016 LH_{41}	—	February 3, 2009	Kitt Peak	Spacewatch	VER	2.0 km	MPC · JPL
564732	2016 LV_{41}	—	January 21, 2015	Mount Lemmon	Mount Lemmon Survey	·	1.9 km	MPC · JPL
564733	2016 LS_{42}	—	October 8, 2012	Mount Lemmon	Mount Lemmon Survey	·	1.6 km	MPC · JPL
564734	2016 LJ_{43}	—	April 11, 2016	Haleakala	Pan-STARRS 1	·	2.3 km	MPC · JPL
564735	2016 LN_{44}	—	October 21, 2012	Mount Lemmon	Mount Lemmon Survey	·	3.3 km	MPC · JPL
564736	2016 LO_{44}	—	December 24, 2013	Mount Lemmon	Mount Lemmon Survey	EOS	1.7 km	MPC · JPL
564737	2016 LV_{44}	—	March 24, 2015	Haleakala	Pan-STARRS 1	·	2.9 km	MPC · JPL
564738	2016 LH_{45}	—	January 19, 2004	Kitt Peak	Spacewatch	·	1.7 km	MPC · JPL
564739	2016 LP_{46}	—	January 17, 2016	Haleakala	Pan-STARRS 1	·	2.2 km	MPC · JPL
564740	2016 LA_{47}	—	March 27, 2012	Mount Lemmon	Mount Lemmon Survey	·	1.4 km	MPC · JPL
564741	2016 LS_{48}	—	March 24, 2003	Apache Point	SDSS Collaboration	H	460 m	MPC · JPL
564742	2016 LC_{51}	—	December 12, 2006	Catalina	CSS	H	430 m	MPC · JPL
564743	2016 LO_{51}	—	September 21, 2009	Mount Lemmon	Mount Lemmon Survey	H	340 m	MPC · JPL
564744	2016 LG_{52}	—	October 31, 2008	Catalina	CSS	H	540 m	MPC · JPL
564745	2016 LH_{52}	—	June 5, 2013	Kitt Peak	Spacewatch	H	400 m	MPC · JPL
564746	2016 LM_{52}	—	October 29, 2011	Haleakala	Pan-STARRS 1	H	450 m	MPC · JPL
564747	2016 LS_{52}	—	February 13, 2010	Catalina	CSS	H	560 m	MPC · JPL
564748	2016 LV_{52}	—	June 5, 2016	Haleakala	Pan-STARRS 1	H	440 m	MPC · JPL
564749	2016 LE_{53}	—	June 5, 2016	Haleakala	Pan-STARRS 1	H	540 m	MPC · JPL
564750	2016 LG_{53}	—	June 6, 2016	Mount Lemmon	Mount Lemmon Survey	H	270 m	MPC · JPL
564751	2016 LQ_{56}	—	May 21, 2015	Haleakala	Pan-STARRS 1	VER	2.6 km	MPC · JPL
564752	2016 LB_{57}	—	November 4, 2012	Kitt Peak	Spacewatch	·	1.7 km	MPC · JPL
564753	2016 LS_{57}	—	July 9, 2002	Palomar	NEAT	·	2.6 km	MPC · JPL
564754	2016 LH_{58}	—	June 4, 2016	Mount Lemmon	Mount Lemmon Survey	·	2.7 km	MPC · JPL
564755	2016 LN_{61}	—	December 31, 2013	Haleakala	Pan-STARRS 1	·	2.8 km	MPC · JPL
564756	2016 LT_{66}	—	February 14, 2010	Kitt Peak	Spacewatch	·	2.7 km	MPC · JPL
564757	2016 LX_{67}	—	January 20, 2009	Kitt Peak	Spacewatch	VER	2.0 km	MPC · JPL
564758	2016 LN_{68}	—	June 15, 2016	Haleakala	Pan-STARRS 1	H	480 m	MPC · JPL
564759	2016 LU_{68}	—	October 9, 2012	Catalina	CSS	·	2.9 km	MPC · JPL
564760	2016 LW_{69}	—	June 14, 2016	Mount Lemmon	Mount Lemmon Survey	HNS	960 m	MPC · JPL
564761	2016 LD_{76}	—	June 8, 2016	Haleakala	Pan-STARRS 1	·	1.7 km	MPC · JPL
564762	2016 LG_{83}	—	June 8, 2016	Haleakala	Pan-STARRS 1	·	1.9 km	MPC · JPL
564763	2016 MT_{1}	—	January 23, 2015	Haleakala	Pan-STARRS 1	·	2.3 km	MPC · JPL
564764	2016 MB_{4}	—	April 11, 2005	Kitt Peak	Spacewatch	·	2.1 km	MPC · JPL
564765	2016 MT_{5}	—	June 29, 2016	Haleakala	Pan-STARRS 1	·	2.5 km	MPC · JPL
564766	2016 NL_{1}	—	December 3, 2014	Haleakala	Pan-STARRS 1	H	500 m	MPC · JPL
564767	2016 NR_{1}	—	April 10, 2010	Mount Lemmon	Mount Lemmon Survey	THM	2.1 km	MPC · JPL
564768	2016 NT_{1}	—	October 25, 2014	Haleakala	Pan-STARRS 1	H	390 m	MPC · JPL
564769	2016 NG_{3}	—	April 24, 2015	Haleakala	Pan-STARRS 1	EOS	1.8 km	MPC · JPL
564770	2016 NE_{6}	—	March 12, 2014	Mount Lemmon	Mount Lemmon Survey	·	3.9 km	MPC · JPL
564771	2016 NX_{7}	—	December 21, 2014	Mount Lemmon	Mount Lemmon Survey	·	2.5 km	MPC · JPL
564772	2016 NC_{11}	—	July 5, 2016	Mount Lemmon	Mount Lemmon Survey	VER	2.4 km	MPC · JPL
564773	2016 NM_{12}	—	August 25, 2000	Cerro Tololo	Deep Ecliptic Survey	·	2.4 km	MPC · JPL
564774	2016 NM_{13}	—	November 12, 2012	Mount Lemmon	Mount Lemmon Survey	·	2.6 km	MPC · JPL
564775	2016 NO_{13}	—	May 4, 2000	Apache Point	SDSS Collaboration	·	1.9 km	MPC · JPL
564776	2016 NG_{14}	—	May 18, 2009	Mount Lemmon	Mount Lemmon Survey	·	3.6 km	MPC · JPL
564777	2016 NW_{14}	—	January 29, 2009	Kitt Peak	Spacewatch	TIR	2.5 km	MPC · JPL
564778	2016 NB_{16}	—	November 22, 2006	Catalina	CSS	H	800 m	MPC · JPL
564779	2016 NQ_{18}	—	June 5, 2016	Mount Lemmon	Mount Lemmon Survey	·	1.8 km	MPC · JPL
564780 Igorkarachentsev	2016 NL_{27}	Igorkarachentsev	October 25, 2011	Zelenchukskaya Stn	T. V. Krjačko, Satovski, B.	URS	3.1 km	MPC · JPL
564781	2016 NR_{27}	—	February 13, 2008	Kitt Peak	Spacewatch	TIR	2.6 km	MPC · JPL
564782	2016 NF_{34}	—	July 12, 2016	Mount Lemmon	Mount Lemmon Survey	·	2.8 km	MPC · JPL
564783	2016 NO_{55}	—	December 16, 2006	Kitt Peak	Spacewatch	H	490 m	MPC · JPL
564784	2016 NF_{58}	—	July 7, 2016	Haleakala	Pan-STARRS 1	H	490 m	MPC · JPL
564785	2016 NA_{73}	—	April 23, 2015	Haleakala	Pan-STARRS 1	·	2.9 km	MPC · JPL
564786	2016 NB_{80}	—	February 23, 2015	Haleakala	Pan-STARRS 1	·	1.8 km	MPC · JPL
564787	2016 ND_{89}	—	November 12, 2012	Mount Lemmon	Mount Lemmon Survey	KOR	1.0 km	MPC · JPL
564788	2016 NV_{92}	—	July 11, 2016	Haleakala	Pan-STARRS 1	·	740 m	MPC · JPL
564789	2016 NQ_{104}	—	July 4, 2016	Haleakala	Pan-STARRS 1	·	990 m	MPC · JPL
564790	2016 NV_{104}	—	July 3, 2016	Mount Lemmon	Mount Lemmon Survey	·	570 m	MPC · JPL
564791	2016 NH_{108}	—	November 1, 2011	Kitt Peak	Spacewatch	·	2.5 km	MPC · JPL
564792	2016 ND_{130}	—	July 3, 2016	Mount Lemmon	Mount Lemmon Survey	·	830 m	MPC · JPL
564793	2016 OS	—	February 10, 2002	Kitt Peak	Spacewatch	H	600 m	MPC · JPL
564794	2016 OL_{4}	—	February 1, 2009	Kitt Peak	Spacewatch	·	2.5 km	MPC · JPL
564795	2016 OX_{7}	—	October 9, 2012	Haleakala	Pan-STARRS 1	HNS	940 m	MPC · JPL
564796	2016 PN_{2}	—	March 17, 2013	Mount Lemmon	Mount Lemmon Survey	H	390 m	MPC · JPL
564797	2016 PY_{5}	—	August 31, 2000	Socorro	LINEAR	·	830 m	MPC · JPL
564798	2016 PH_{8}	—	January 14, 2015	Haleakala	Pan-STARRS 1	H	470 m	MPC · JPL
564799	2016 PX_{14}	—	April 13, 2015	Haleakala	Pan-STARRS 1	VER	2.3 km	MPC · JPL
564800	2016 PG_{20}	—	December 19, 2001	Kitt Peak	Spacewatch	VER	2.8 km	MPC · JPL

== 564801–564900 ==
back to top

Designation			Discovery			Properties		Ref
Permanent	Provisional	Named after	Date	Site	Discoverer(s)	Category	Diam.	Ref
564801	2016 PZ_{27}	—	August 6, 2016	Haleakala	Pan-STARRS 1	·	840 m	MPC · JPL
564802	2016 PQ_{33}	—	October 2, 2006	Mount Lemmon	Mount Lemmon Survey	·	2.1 km	MPC · JPL
564803	2016 PL_{42}	—	January 13, 2013	Mount Lemmon	Mount Lemmon Survey	·	3.4 km	MPC · JPL
564804	2016 PU_{48}	—	April 5, 2008	Mount Lemmon	Mount Lemmon Survey	·	3.1 km	MPC · JPL
564805	2016 PY_{48}	—	July 4, 2016	Haleakala	Pan-STARRS 1	VER	2.1 km	MPC · JPL
564806	2016 PJ_{49}	—	May 3, 2008	Kitt Peak	Spacewatch	·	3.4 km	MPC · JPL
564807	2016 PH_{57}	—	January 10, 2014	Catalina	CSS	·	2.1 km	MPC · JPL
564808 Pallai	2016 PY_{67}	Pallai	August 26, 2011	Piszkéstető	S. Kürti, K. Sárneczky	EOS	1.6 km	MPC · JPL
564809	2016 PQ_{68}	—	March 19, 2009	Kitt Peak	Spacewatch	·	2.8 km	MPC · JPL
564810	2016 PS_{73}	—	August 10, 2016	Haleakala	Pan-STARRS 1	·	1.3 km	MPC · JPL
564811	2016 PR_{79}	—	November 2, 2008	Mount Lemmon	Mount Lemmon Survey	·	780 m	MPC · JPL
564812	2016 PT_{99}	—	January 20, 2009	Mount Lemmon	Mount Lemmon Survey	NEM	1.6 km	MPC · JPL
564813	2016 PU_{106}	—	November 19, 2006	Kitt Peak	Spacewatch	·	2.2 km	MPC · JPL
564814	2016 PC_{116}	—	August 10, 2007	Kitt Peak	Spacewatch	·	1.6 km	MPC · JPL
564815	2016 PY_{116}	—	August 7, 2008	Kitt Peak	Spacewatch	·	650 m	MPC · JPL
564816	2016 PM_{119}	—	June 18, 2015	Haleakala	Pan-STARRS 1	·	1.9 km	MPC · JPL
564817	2016 PC_{128}	—	January 23, 2015	Haleakala	Pan-STARRS 1	H	420 m	MPC · JPL
564818	2016 PC_{130}	—	August 3, 2016	Haleakala	Pan-STARRS 1	·	970 m	MPC · JPL
564819	2016 PY_{130}	—	August 10, 2016	Haleakala	Pan-STARRS 1	·	770 m	MPC · JPL
564820	2016 PF_{133}	—	August 9, 2016	Haleakala	Pan-STARRS 1	H	460 m	MPC · JPL
564821	2016 PQ_{167}	—	August 8, 2016	Haleakala	Pan-STARRS 1	·	960 m	MPC · JPL
564822	2016 PY_{180}	—	August 3, 2016	Haleakala	Pan-STARRS 1	EOS	1.3 km	MPC · JPL
564823	2016 QA_{9}	—	October 27, 2006	Catalina	CSS	EOS	2.0 km	MPC · JPL
564824	2016 QE_{10}	—	May 19, 2013	Mount Lemmon	Mount Lemmon Survey	H	550 m	MPC · JPL
564825	2016 QT_{11}	—	July 4, 1995	Kitt Peak	Spacewatch	EOS	1.7 km	MPC · JPL
564826	2016 QA_{14}	—	August 24, 2007	Kitt Peak	Spacewatch	·	1.4 km	MPC · JPL
564827	2016 QP_{14}	—	August 29, 2005	Kitt Peak	Spacewatch	·	840 m	MPC · JPL
564828	2016 QU_{16}	—	December 6, 2012	Kitt Peak	Spacewatch	EOS	2.0 km	MPC · JPL
564829	2016 QK_{17}	—	August 26, 2016	Haleakala	Pan-STARRS 1	·	3.0 km	MPC · JPL
564830	2016 QB_{28}	—	December 23, 2012	Haleakala	Pan-STARRS 1	·	3.0 km	MPC · JPL
564831	2016 QG_{30}	—	July 11, 2016	Haleakala	Pan-STARRS 1	·	2.9 km	MPC · JPL
564832	2016 QD_{39}	—	March 3, 2005	Kitt Peak	Spacewatch	H	540 m	MPC · JPL
564833	2016 QK_{43}	—	October 19, 2006	Mount Lemmon	Mount Lemmon Survey	·	510 m	MPC · JPL
564834	2016 QO_{48}	—	September 11, 2005	Kitt Peak	Spacewatch	·	2.1 km	MPC · JPL
564835	2016 QY_{48}	—	August 5, 2005	Palomar	NEAT	·	2.0 km	MPC · JPL
564836	2016 QO_{59}	—	April 16, 2012	Haleakala	Pan-STARRS 1	·	450 m	MPC · JPL
564837	2016 QT_{64}	—	July 11, 2016	Haleakala	Pan-STARRS 1	·	1.6 km	MPC · JPL
564838	2016 QB_{66}	—	July 8, 2016	Kitt Peak	Spacewatch	·	2.3 km	MPC · JPL
564839	2016 QW_{73}	—	June 30, 2005	Palomar	NEAT	·	2.5 km	MPC · JPL
564840	2016 QN_{76}	—	June 10, 2016	Haleakala	Pan-STARRS 1	H	460 m	MPC · JPL
564841	2016 QX_{76}	—	February 20, 2015	Haleakala	Pan-STARRS 1	·	1.8 km	MPC · JPL
564842	2016 QN_{88}	—	April 23, 2015	Haleakala	Pan-STARRS 1	·	1.8 km	MPC · JPL
564843	2016 QE_{90}	—	December 23, 2012	Haleakala	Pan-STARRS 1	·	1.6 km	MPC · JPL
564844	2016 QL_{105}	—	August 30, 2016	Mount Lemmon	Mount Lemmon Survey	·	2.8 km	MPC · JPL
564845	2016 RB_{5}	—	April 17, 2010	WISE	WISE	LIX	2.8 km	MPC · JPL
564846	2016 RG_{6}	—	September 3, 2016	Kitt Peak	Spacewatch	·	2.9 km	MPC · JPL
564847	2016 RV_{6}	—	July 8, 2005	Kitt Peak	Spacewatch	·	3.7 km	MPC · JPL
564848	2016 RO_{14}	—	July 7, 2016	Haleakala	Pan-STARRS 1	·	2.7 km	MPC · JPL
564849	2016 RM_{16}	—	May 21, 2010	Mount Lemmon	Mount Lemmon Survey	·	1.9 km	MPC · JPL
564850	2016 RK_{33}	—	October 8, 2012	Kitt Peak	Spacewatch	·	1.2 km	MPC · JPL
564851	2016 RV_{39}	—	October 7, 2013	Kitt Peak	Spacewatch	·	750 m	MPC · JPL
564852	2016 ST	—	April 16, 2005	Kitt Peak	Spacewatch	H	430 m	MPC · JPL
564853	2016 SG_{14}	—	June 12, 2015	Mount Lemmon	Mount Lemmon Survey	·	2.6 km	MPC · JPL
564854	2016 SG_{16}	—	March 6, 2002	Palomar	NEAT	·	880 m	MPC · JPL
564855	2016 SS_{20}	—	July 27, 2011	Haleakala	Pan-STARRS 1	·	1.5 km	MPC · JPL
564856	2016 SQ_{27}	—	November 12, 2010	Mount Lemmon	Mount Lemmon Survey	·	860 m	MPC · JPL
564857	2016 SK_{31}	—	October 30, 2006	Mount Lemmon	Mount Lemmon Survey	·	4.6 km	MPC · JPL
564858	2016 SM_{35}	—	February 19, 2010	Mount Lemmon	Mount Lemmon Survey	·	1.2 km	MPC · JPL
564859	2016 SF_{37}	—	October 6, 2013	Kitt Peak	Spacewatch	·	750 m	MPC · JPL
564860	2016 SO_{39}	—	December 19, 2007	Kitt Peak	Spacewatch	·	680 m	MPC · JPL
564861	2016 SV_{39}	—	October 29, 2010	Kitt Peak	Spacewatch	·	880 m	MPC · JPL
564862	2016 SK_{42}	—	February 12, 2011	Mount Lemmon	Mount Lemmon Survey	·	1.0 km	MPC · JPL
564863	2016 SS_{50}	—	June 19, 2006	Kitt Peak	Spacewatch	·	1.9 km	MPC · JPL
564864	2016 SH_{82}	—	March 9, 2002	Kitt Peak	Spacewatch	KON	1.8 km	MPC · JPL
564865	2016 SE_{87}	—	September 22, 2016	Mount Lemmon	Mount Lemmon Survey	HNS	830 m	MPC · JPL
564866	2016 TA_{2}	—	September 11, 2005	Kitt Peak	Spacewatch	H	550 m	MPC · JPL
564867	2016 TW_{2}	—	October 31, 2011	Catalina	CSS	T_{j} (2.94)	3.8 km	MPC · JPL
564868	2016 TH_{4}	—	March 3, 2009	Kitt Peak	Spacewatch	·	3.2 km	MPC · JPL
564869	2016 TL_{5}	—	November 30, 2005	Mount Lemmon	Mount Lemmon Survey	·	950 m	MPC · JPL
564870	2016 TB_{12}	—	July 13, 2013	Haleakala	Pan-STARRS 1	·	800 m	MPC · JPL
564871	2016 TT_{14}	—	September 11, 2005	Kitt Peak	Spacewatch	MAS	500 m	MPC · JPL
564872	2016 TY_{14}	—	August 18, 2009	Kitt Peak	Spacewatch	·	990 m	MPC · JPL
564873	2016 TQ_{19}	—	November 20, 2011	Haleakala	Pan-STARRS 1	H	480 m	MPC · JPL
564874	2016 TM_{21}	—	July 7, 2016	Mount Lemmon	Mount Lemmon Survey	H	490 m	MPC · JPL
564875	2016 TL_{25}	—	November 2, 2013	Mount Lemmon	Mount Lemmon Survey	·	730 m	MPC · JPL
564876	2016 TC_{30}	—	February 9, 2008	Kitt Peak	Spacewatch	·	750 m	MPC · JPL
564877	2016 TA_{45}	—	October 25, 2011	Haleakala	Pan-STARRS 1	·	3.5 km	MPC · JPL
564878	2016 TF_{50}	—	January 25, 2009	Kitt Peak	Spacewatch	WIT	770 m	MPC · JPL
564879	2016 TQ_{52}	—	September 24, 2009	Mount Lemmon	Mount Lemmon Survey	·	660 m	MPC · JPL
564880	2016 TB_{53}	—	September 11, 2005	Kitt Peak	Spacewatch	·	1.0 km	MPC · JPL
564881	2016 TC_{56}	—	December 30, 2014	Haleakala	Pan-STARRS 1	H	640 m	MPC · JPL
564882	2016 TS_{56}	—	March 28, 2015	Haleakala	Pan-STARRS 1	H	490 m	MPC · JPL
564883	2016 TZ_{56}	—	October 10, 2016	Mount Lemmon	Mount Lemmon Survey	AMO	490 m	MPC · JPL
564884	2016 TJ_{58}	—	May 5, 2014	Haleakala	Pan-STARRS 1	·	3.6 km	MPC · JPL
564885	2016 TX_{62}	—	September 18, 2009	Kitt Peak	Spacewatch	·	680 m	MPC · JPL
564886	2016 TL_{67}	—	July 8, 2005	Kitt Peak	Spacewatch	EOS	2.0 km	MPC · JPL
564887	2016 TR_{71}	—	April 15, 2008	Kitt Peak	Spacewatch	·	3.1 km	MPC · JPL
564888	2016 TJ_{73}	—	March 12, 2008	Mount Lemmon	Mount Lemmon Survey	EOS	1.8 km	MPC · JPL
564889	2016 TN_{77}	—	May 11, 2008	Kitt Peak	Spacewatch	·	860 m	MPC · JPL
564890	2016 TC_{81}	—	October 27, 2003	Kitt Peak	Spacewatch	·	750 m	MPC · JPL
564891	2016 TV_{87}	—	October 11, 2016	Mount Lemmon	Mount Lemmon Survey	H	480 m	MPC · JPL
564892	2016 TT_{99}	—	February 13, 2011	Mount Lemmon	Mount Lemmon Survey	·	800 m	MPC · JPL
564893	2016 TP_{103}	—	October 8, 2016	Haleakala	Pan-STARRS 1	HNS	1.0 km	MPC · JPL
564894	2016 TC_{117}	—	October 7, 2016	Mount Lemmon	Mount Lemmon Survey	·	1.7 km	MPC · JPL
564895	2016 TO_{121}	—	October 6, 2016	Haleakala	Pan-STARRS 1	·	1.3 km	MPC · JPL
564896	2016 TJ_{124}	—	October 6, 2016	Haleakala	Pan-STARRS 1	·	2.2 km	MPC · JPL
564897	2016 TC_{125}	—	September 14, 2010	Mount Lemmon	Mount Lemmon Survey	·	2.4 km	MPC · JPL
564898	2016 TY_{149}	—	January 28, 2011	Kitt Peak	Spacewatch	·	670 m	MPC · JPL
564899	2016 UN_{2}	—	September 28, 2009	Mount Lemmon	Mount Lemmon Survey	·	860 m	MPC · JPL
564900	2016 UV_{12}	—	March 22, 2015	Haleakala	Pan-STARRS 1	·	1.0 km	MPC · JPL

== 564901–565000 ==
back to top

Designation			Discovery			Properties		Ref
Permanent	Provisional	Named after	Date	Site	Discoverer(s)	Category	Diam.	Ref
564901	2016 UY_{14}	—	April 5, 2005	Mount Lemmon	Mount Lemmon Survey	·	520 m	MPC · JPL
564902	2016 UQ_{29}	—	October 21, 2016	Mount Lemmon	Mount Lemmon Survey	·	530 m	MPC · JPL
564903	2016 UD_{40}	—	July 30, 2005	Palomar	NEAT	·	760 m	MPC · JPL
564904	2016 UU_{41}	—	September 2, 2016	Piszkéstető	K. Sárneczky	H	650 m	MPC · JPL
564905	2016 UU_{51}	—	December 30, 2010	Piszkés-tető	K. Sárneczky, Z. Kuli	·	880 m	MPC · JPL
564906	2016 UL_{56}	—	March 18, 2015	Haleakala	Pan-STARRS 1	·	770 m	MPC · JPL
564907	2016 US_{62}	—	May 8, 2006	Mount Lemmon	Mount Lemmon Survey	·	1.8 km	MPC · JPL
564908	2016 UX_{65}	—	May 4, 2005	Kitt Peak	Spacewatch	·	840 m	MPC · JPL
564909	2016 UJ_{66}	—	December 21, 2006	Mount Lemmon	Mount Lemmon Survey	·	590 m	MPC · JPL
564910	2016 UK_{71}	—	December 24, 2013	Mount Lemmon	Mount Lemmon Survey	·	660 m	MPC · JPL
564911	2016 UE_{72}	—	October 25, 2011	Haleakala	Pan-STARRS 1	·	2.0 km	MPC · JPL
564912	2016 UC_{76}	—	January 13, 2005	Kitt Peak	Spacewatch	·	730 m	MPC · JPL
564913	2016 UO_{80}	—	March 8, 2005	Mount Lemmon	Mount Lemmon Survey	·	550 m	MPC · JPL
564914	2016 US_{85}	—	September 25, 2009	Kitt Peak	Spacewatch	(2076)	710 m	MPC · JPL
564915	2016 UZ_{108}	—	November 5, 2007	Mount Lemmon	Mount Lemmon Survey	·	1.6 km	MPC · JPL
564916	2016 UR_{131}	—	June 17, 2015	Haleakala	Pan-STARRS 1	·	1.4 km	MPC · JPL
564917	2016 UF_{136}	—	April 8, 2008	Mount Lemmon	Mount Lemmon Survey	·	730 m	MPC · JPL
564918	2016 US_{142}	—	October 3, 2005	Catalina	CSS	H	490 m	MPC · JPL
564919	2016 UT_{144}	—	October 28, 2011	Mount Lemmon	Mount Lemmon Survey	·	2.0 km	MPC · JPL
564920	2016 UZ_{145}	—	November 16, 2003	Kitt Peak	Spacewatch	·	570 m	MPC · JPL
564921	2016 UG_{147}	—	October 3, 2005	Palomar	NEAT	·	4.2 km	MPC · JPL
564922	2016 UB_{184}	—	April 3, 2011	Haleakala	Pan-STARRS 1	·	560 m	MPC · JPL
564923	2016 UL_{249}	—	October 22, 2016	Mount Lemmon	Mount Lemmon Survey	·	1.8 km	MPC · JPL
564924	2016 UW_{251}	—	October 21, 2016	Mount Lemmon	Mount Lemmon Survey	·	1.3 km	MPC · JPL
564925	2016 UG_{252}	—	October 8, 2007	Mount Lemmon	Mount Lemmon Survey	·	1.1 km	MPC · JPL
564926	2016 VM_{4}	—	September 22, 1995	Kitt Peak	Spacewatch	·	1.4 km	MPC · JPL
564927	2016 VV_{4}	—	December 22, 2008	Kitt Peak	Spacewatch	H	640 m	MPC · JPL
564928	2016 VX_{19}	—	October 22, 2012	Haleakala	Pan-STARRS 1	·	820 m	MPC · JPL
564929	2016 VY_{19}	—	December 15, 2007	Kitt Peak	Spacewatch	MAR	1.1 km	MPC · JPL
564930	2016 VG_{21}	—	August 22, 2004	Kitt Peak	Spacewatch	·	1.3 km	MPC · JPL
564931	2016 VZ_{22}	—	January 23, 2006	Kitt Peak	Spacewatch	TIR	2.2 km	MPC · JPL
564932	2016 VY_{39}	—	November 10, 2016	Haleakala	Pan-STARRS 1	PHO	960 m	MPC · JPL
564933	2016 VN_{46}	—	November 5, 2016	Mount Lemmon	Mount Lemmon Survey	·	730 m	MPC · JPL
564934	2016 WE_{1}	—	October 20, 2016	Mount Lemmon	Mount Lemmon Survey	AMO	440 m	MPC · JPL
564935	2016 WK_{5}	—	June 4, 2011	Mount Lemmon	Mount Lemmon Survey	·	770 m	MPC · JPL
564936	2016 WN_{11}	—	September 18, 2006	Kitt Peak	Spacewatch	·	670 m	MPC · JPL
564937	2016 WR_{11}	—	October 2, 2006	Mount Lemmon	Mount Lemmon Survey	·	500 m	MPC · JPL
564938	2016 WP_{13}	—	January 2, 2014	Kitt Peak	Spacewatch	·	690 m	MPC · JPL
564939	2016 WE_{15}	—	September 15, 2006	Kitt Peak	Spacewatch	·	530 m	MPC · JPL
564940	2016 WO_{15}	—	December 25, 2013	Mount Lemmon	Mount Lemmon Survey	·	570 m	MPC · JPL
564941	2016 WG_{19}	—	December 15, 2006	Kitt Peak	Spacewatch	·	500 m	MPC · JPL
564942	2016 WR_{22}	—	September 18, 2009	Kitt Peak	Spacewatch	·	540 m	MPC · JPL
564943	2016 WK_{23}	—	November 22, 2005	Catalina	CSS	H	480 m	MPC · JPL
564944	2016 WJ_{26}	—	November 19, 2009	Kitt Peak	Spacewatch	V	580 m	MPC · JPL
564945	2016 WY_{36}	—	October 7, 2000	Kitt Peak	Spacewatch	·	540 m	MPC · JPL
564946	2016 WA_{38}	—	September 20, 2009	Kitt Peak	Spacewatch	·	620 m	MPC · JPL
564947	2016 WZ_{40}	—	March 22, 2015	Haleakala	Pan-STARRS 1	·	650 m	MPC · JPL
564948	2016 WY_{44}	—	October 9, 2007	Catalina	CSS	·	1.6 km	MPC · JPL
564949	2016 WH_{49}	—	September 25, 2006	Kitt Peak	Spacewatch	·	460 m	MPC · JPL
564950	2016 WH_{50}	—	April 4, 2002	Palomar	NEAT	·	800 m	MPC · JPL
564951	2016 WR_{50}	—	February 8, 2008	Mount Lemmon	Mount Lemmon Survey	·	600 m	MPC · JPL
564952	2016 WX_{52}	—	October 27, 2016	Mount Lemmon	Mount Lemmon Survey	V	630 m	MPC · JPL
564953	2016 XM_{3}	—	September 10, 2016	Mount Lemmon	Mount Lemmon Survey	·	710 m	MPC · JPL
564954	2016 XG_{4}	—	March 8, 1997	Kitt Peak	Spacewatch	·	930 m	MPC · JPL
564955	2016 XY_{12}	—	September 16, 2003	Kitt Peak	Spacewatch	·	520 m	MPC · JPL
564956	2016 XU_{21}	—	December 21, 2005	Socorro	LINEAR	PHO	1.1 km	MPC · JPL
564957	2016 XH_{22}	—	October 26, 2009	Mount Lemmon	Mount Lemmon Survey	·	690 m	MPC · JPL
564958	2016 XV_{24}	—	October 11, 2012	Kitt Peak	Spacewatch	PHO	600 m	MPC · JPL
564959	2016 XX_{26}	—	December 9, 2016	Mount Lemmon	Mount Lemmon Survey	H	460 m	MPC · JPL
564960	2016 XB_{30}	—	December 4, 2016	Mount Lemmon	Mount Lemmon Survey	·	950 m	MPC · JPL
564961	2016 YR_{5}	—	November 28, 2014	Haleakala	Pan-STARRS 1	L5	7.5 km	MPC · JPL
564962	2016 YE_{6}	—	November 23, 2009	Mount Lemmon	Mount Lemmon Survey	V	620 m	MPC · JPL
564963	2016 YV_{6}	—	April 28, 2008	Catalina	CSS	PHO	860 m	MPC · JPL
564964	2016 YY_{8}	—	October 23, 2003	Kitt Peak	Spacewatch	·	610 m	MPC · JPL
564965	2016 YE_{9}	—	February 25, 2014	Haleakala	Pan-STARRS 1	BAP	800 m	MPC · JPL
564966	2016 YX_{10}	—	December 22, 2012	Haleakala	Pan-STARRS 1	·	1 km	MPC · JPL
564967	2016 YA_{18}	—	December 23, 2016	Haleakala	Pan-STARRS 1	L5	7.2 km	MPC · JPL
564968	2016 YU_{18}	—	December 23, 2016	Haleakala	Pan-STARRS 1	L5	7.1 km	MPC · JPL
564969	2016 YQ_{24}	—	January 9, 2002	Socorro	LINEAR	·	1.4 km	MPC · JPL
564970	2017 AC	—	December 29, 2008	Kitt Peak	Spacewatch	·	1.2 km	MPC · JPL
564971	2017 AY_{2}	—	December 30, 2005	Kitt Peak	Spacewatch	V	650 m	MPC · JPL
564972	2017 AZ_{4}	—	August 30, 2005	Kitt Peak	Spacewatch	·	670 m	MPC · JPL
564973	2017 AB_{6}	—	April 28, 2014	Haleakala	Pan-STARRS 1	·	630 m	MPC · JPL
564974	2017 AH_{6}	—	January 29, 2003	Apache Point	SDSS Collaboration	·	800 m	MPC · JPL
564975	2017 AQ_{6}	—	January 27, 2007	Mount Lemmon	Mount Lemmon Survey	·	800 m	MPC · JPL
564976	2017 AY_{6}	—	November 27, 2009	Kitt Peak	Spacewatch	·	920 m	MPC · JPL
564977	2017 AN_{10}	—	September 6, 2010	Mount Lemmon	Mount Lemmon Survey	·	2.3 km	MPC · JPL
564978	2017 AO_{11}	—	October 24, 2003	Apache Point	SDSS Collaboration	·	1.4 km	MPC · JPL
564979	2017 AZ_{11}	—	September 21, 2012	Kitt Peak	Spacewatch	·	860 m	MPC · JPL
564980	2017 AQ_{14}	—	September 3, 2008	Kitt Peak	Spacewatch	·	1.1 km	MPC · JPL
564981	2017 AR_{14}	—	December 8, 2005	Kitt Peak	Spacewatch	·	1.0 km	MPC · JPL
564982	2017 AZ_{14}	—	November 16, 2006	Mount Lemmon	Mount Lemmon Survey	·	570 m	MPC · JPL
564983	2017 AO_{16}	—	November 6, 2012	Mount Lemmon	Mount Lemmon Survey	·	650 m	MPC · JPL
564984	2017 AS_{18}	—	November 25, 2005	Mount Lemmon	Mount Lemmon Survey	·	620 m	MPC · JPL
564985	2017 AV_{19}	—	October 15, 2012	Kitt Peak	Spacewatch	·	810 m	MPC · JPL
564986	2017 AC_{20}	—	January 6, 2010	Kitt Peak	Spacewatch	·	1.1 km	MPC · JPL
564987	2017 AU_{21}	—	January 19, 2013	Mount Lemmon	Mount Lemmon Survey	·	940 m	MPC · JPL
564988	2017 AV_{21}	—	November 5, 2007	Mount Lemmon	Mount Lemmon Survey	·	1.7 km	MPC · JPL
564989	2017 AJ_{22}	—	September 2, 2011	Haleakala	Pan-STARRS 1	·	1.3 km	MPC · JPL
564990	2017 AW_{22}	—	January 4, 2013	Kitt Peak	Spacewatch	·	1.1 km	MPC · JPL
564991	2017 AG_{23}	—	April 10, 2010	Mount Lemmon	Mount Lemmon Survey	V	570 m	MPC · JPL
564992	2017 AH_{23}	—	January 26, 2006	Kitt Peak	Spacewatch	V	560 m	MPC · JPL
564993	2017 AP_{23}	—	July 3, 2011	Mount Lemmon	Mount Lemmon Survey	·	1.2 km	MPC · JPL
564994	2017 AD_{24}	—	October 6, 2008	Mount Lemmon	Mount Lemmon Survey	·	1.0 km	MPC · JPL
564995	2017 AU_{24}	—	April 11, 2013	Mount Lemmon	Mount Lemmon Survey	MAR	970 m	MPC · JPL
564996	2017 AP_{27}	—	January 2, 2017	Haleakala	Pan-STARRS 1	MAR	970 m	MPC · JPL
564997	2017 AW_{31}	—	January 4, 2017	Haleakala	Pan-STARRS 1	·	2.0 km	MPC · JPL
564998	2017 BB	—	August 28, 2002	Palomar	NEAT	·	780 m	MPC · JPL
564999	2017 BC_{2}	—	December 27, 2006	Mount Lemmon	Mount Lemmon Survey	·	580 m	MPC · JPL
565000	2017 BD_{2}	—	July 26, 2005	Palomar	NEAT	·	1.9 km	MPC · JPL

back to top

== Meaning of names ==
As minor planet discoveries are confirmed, they are given a permanent number by the IAU's Minor Planet Center (MPC), and the discoverers can then submit names for them, following the IAU's naming conventions. The list below concerns those minor planets in the specified number-range that have received names, and explains the meanings of those names.

Official naming citations of newly named small Solar System bodies are approved and published in a bulletin by IAU's Working Group for Small Bodies Nomenclature (WGSBN). Before May 2021, citations were published in MPC's Minor Planet Circulars for many decades. Recent citations can also be found on the JPL Small-Body Database (SBDB). Until his death in 2016, German astronomer Lutz D. Schmadel compiled these citations into the Dictionary of Minor Planet Names (DMP) and regularly updated the collection.

Based on Paul Herget's The Names of the Minor Planets, Schmadel also researched the unclear origin of numerous asteroids, most of which had been named prior to World War II. This article incorporates text from this source, which is in the public domain: SBDB New namings may only be added to this list below after official publication as the preannouncement of names is condemned. The WGSBN publishes a comprehensive guideline for the naming rules of non-cometary small Solar System bodies.

Named minor planet	Provisional	This minor planet was named for...	Ref · Catalog
564052 Melissagraham	2016 FY_{1}	Melissa Graham (b. 1981) is a Canadian astronomer and research staff scientist in the Department of Astronomy at the University of Washington in Seattle.	IAU · 564052
564280 Tudorica	2016 GU_{65}	Alexandru Tudorică (born 1987) is a Romanian astronomer and science communicator whose research includes globular clusters and Solar System astronomy with the European Near Earth Asteroids Research. He obtained his PhD from the University of Bonn with a thesis about the magnification effects of weak gravitational lensing.	IAU · 564280
564780 Igorkarachentsev	2016 NL_{27}	Igor Karachentsev, Russian astronomer	IAU · 564780
564808 Pallai	2016 PY_{67}	Péter Pallai (b. 1938), a Hungary jazz musician.	IAU · 564808
