= List of minor planets: 664001–665000 =

The following is a partial list of minor planets, running from minor-planet number 664001 through 665000, inclusive. The primary data for this and other partial lists is based on JPL's "Small-Body Orbital Elements" and data available from the Minor Planet Center. Critical list information is also provided by the MPC, unless otherwise specified from Lowell Observatory. A detailed description of the table's columns and additional sources are given on the main page including a complete list of every page in this series, and a statistical break-up on the dynamical classification of minor planets.

Also see the summary list of all named bodies in numerical and alphabetical order, and the corresponding naming citations for the number range of this particular list. New namings may only be added to this list after official publication, as the preannouncement of names is condemned by the Working Group for Small Bodies Nomenclature of the International Astronomical Union.

Near-Earth obj.	MBA (inner)	MBA (outer)	Centaur
Mars-crosser	MBA (middle)	Jupiter trojan	Trans-Neptunian obj.
Unclassified

== 664001–664100 ==
Designation			Discovery			Properties		Ref
Permanent	Provisional	Named after	Date	Site	Discoverer(s)	Category	Diam.	Ref
664001	2008 BP_{57}	—	September 21, 2017	Haleakala	Pan-STARRS 1	·	2.2 km	MPC · JPL
664002	2008 BN_{59}	—	April 23, 2014	Cerro Tololo-DECam	DECam	·	1.5 km	MPC · JPL
664003	2008 CV_{7}	—	February 2, 2008	Mount Lemmon	Mount Lemmon Survey	EOS	1.7 km	MPC · JPL
664004	2008 CX_{20}	—	February 7, 2008	Socorro	LINEAR	·	880 m	MPC · JPL
664005	2008 CP_{35}	—	January 1, 2008	Mount Lemmon	Mount Lemmon Survey	·	890 m	MPC · JPL
664006	2008 CW_{40}	—	September 19, 2006	Catalina	CSS	·	1.1 km	MPC · JPL
664007	2008 CK_{52}	—	January 30, 2008	Mount Lemmon	Mount Lemmon Survey	·	1.8 km	MPC · JPL
664008	2008 CJ_{55}	—	February 7, 2008	Mount Lemmon	Mount Lemmon Survey	·	1.1 km	MPC · JPL
664009	2008 CK_{62}	—	February 8, 2008	Kitt Peak	Spacewatch	·	2.6 km	MPC · JPL
664010	2008 CW_{68}	—	February 2, 2008	Bergisch Gladbach	W. Bickel	EUN	1.2 km	MPC · JPL
664011	2008 CC_{77}	—	January 16, 2008	Kitt Peak	Spacewatch	·	1.1 km	MPC · JPL
664012	2008 CC_{81}	—	February 7, 2008	Kitt Peak	Spacewatch	·	1.1 km	MPC · JPL
664013	2008 CY_{93}	—	February 8, 2008	Mount Lemmon	Mount Lemmon Survey	GEF	1.3 km	MPC · JPL
664014	2008 CY_{95}	—	February 1, 2008	Kitt Peak	Spacewatch	·	1.3 km	MPC · JPL
664015	2008 CY_{96}	—	February 9, 2008	Kitt Peak	Spacewatch	·	660 m	MPC · JPL
664016	2008 CK_{99}	—	January 29, 1995	Kitt Peak	Spacewatch	·	550 m	MPC · JPL
664017	2008 CQ_{104}	—	February 9, 2008	Mount Lemmon	Mount Lemmon Survey	·	1.0 km	MPC · JPL
664018	2008 CX_{104}	—	February 9, 2008	Mount Lemmon	Mount Lemmon Survey	·	990 m	MPC · JPL
664019	2008 CE_{106}	—	February 9, 2008	Mount Lemmon	Mount Lemmon Survey	·	1.5 km	MPC · JPL
664020	2008 CB_{109}	—	November 11, 2006	Kitt Peak	Spacewatch	·	2.3 km	MPC · JPL
664021	2008 CG_{113}	—	February 10, 2008	Kitt Peak	Spacewatch	·	520 m	MPC · JPL
664022	2008 CE_{114}	—	February 10, 2008	Kitt Peak	Spacewatch	EOS	1.5 km	MPC · JPL
664023	2008 CD_{115}	—	February 10, 2008	Kitt Peak	Spacewatch	V	700 m	MPC · JPL
664024	2008 CQ_{115}	—	February 10, 2008	Mount Lemmon	Mount Lemmon Survey	KON	2.3 km	MPC · JPL
664025	2008 CA_{123}	—	February 7, 2008	Mount Lemmon	Mount Lemmon Survey	·	1.5 km	MPC · JPL
664026	2008 CH_{123}	—	February 7, 2008	Mount Lemmon	Mount Lemmon Survey	·	820 m	MPC · JPL
664027	2008 CX_{128}	—	February 8, 2008	Kitt Peak	Spacewatch	·	720 m	MPC · JPL
664028	2008 CC_{129}	—	February 8, 2008	Kitt Peak	Spacewatch	·	970 m	MPC · JPL
664029	2008 CQ_{132}	—	February 8, 2008	Kitt Peak	Spacewatch	·	2.4 km	MPC · JPL
664030	2008 CO_{133}	—	February 8, 2008	Kitt Peak	Spacewatch	·	1.5 km	MPC · JPL
664031	2008 CM_{134}	—	February 8, 2008	Mount Lemmon	Mount Lemmon Survey	·	930 m	MPC · JPL
664032	2008 CT_{136}	—	November 15, 1999	Kitt Peak	Spacewatch	·	1.1 km	MPC · JPL
664033	2008 CL_{145}	—	February 9, 2008	Kitt Peak	Spacewatch	EUN	1.2 km	MPC · JPL
664034	2008 CM_{146}	—	February 9, 2008	Kitt Peak	Spacewatch	EUP	2.7 km	MPC · JPL
664035	2008 CD_{148}	—	October 1, 2005	Catalina	CSS	·	2.7 km	MPC · JPL
664036	2008 CH_{148}	—	February 9, 2008	Catalina	CSS	H	430 m	MPC · JPL
664037	2008 CD_{151}	—	February 9, 2008	Kitt Peak	Spacewatch	EOS	1.5 km	MPC · JPL
664038	2008 CR_{151}	—	February 9, 2008	Kitt Peak	Spacewatch	H	540 m	MPC · JPL
664039	2008 CC_{152}	—	August 29, 2006	Kitt Peak	Spacewatch	·	680 m	MPC · JPL
664040	2008 CK_{155}	—	February 9, 2008	Mount Lemmon	Mount Lemmon Survey	EOS	1.4 km	MPC · JPL
664041	2008 CC_{164}	—	February 10, 2008	Mount Lemmon	Mount Lemmon Survey	·	1.0 km	MPC · JPL
664042	2008 CD_{170}	—	February 2, 2008	Kitt Peak	Spacewatch	(5651)	1.8 km	MPC · JPL
664043	2008 CF_{171}	—	February 12, 2008	Mount Lemmon	Mount Lemmon Survey	EOS	1.5 km	MPC · JPL
664044	2008 CC_{173}	—	February 13, 2008	Kitt Peak	Spacewatch	EOS	1.7 km	MPC · JPL
664045	2008 CO_{174}	—	February 13, 2008	Mount Lemmon	Mount Lemmon Survey	·	1.3 km	MPC · JPL
664046	2008 CA_{175}	—	February 13, 2008	Kitt Peak	Spacewatch	·	420 m	MPC · JPL
664047	2008 CH_{184}	—	February 9, 2008	Kitt Peak	Spacewatch	EOS	1.4 km	MPC · JPL
664048	2008 CC_{189}	—	December 15, 2006	Mount Lemmon	Mount Lemmon Survey	EUN	1.6 km	MPC · JPL
664049	2008 CF_{190}	—	February 3, 2008	Catalina	CSS	·	1.4 km	MPC · JPL
664050	2008 CN_{211}	—	December 18, 2007	Mount Lemmon	Mount Lemmon Survey	·	2.4 km	MPC · JPL
664051	2008 CQ_{214}	—	February 12, 2008	Mount Lemmon	Mount Lemmon Survey	·	1.7 km	MPC · JPL
664052	2008 CE_{217}	—	February 2, 2008	Kitt Peak	Spacewatch	·	2.0 km	MPC · JPL
664053	2008 CT_{218}	—	April 13, 2004	Catalina	CSS	·	1.4 km	MPC · JPL
664054	2008 CG_{222}	—	February 10, 2008	Mount Lemmon	Mount Lemmon Survey	MAR	820 m	MPC · JPL
664055	2008 CR_{223}	—	August 24, 2009	Črni Vrh	Matičič, S.	·	700 m	MPC · JPL
664056	2008 CA_{224}	—	February 12, 2008	Kitt Peak	Spacewatch	·	2.0 km	MPC · JPL
664057	2008 CJ_{224}	—	September 5, 2016	Mount Lemmon	Mount Lemmon Survey	·	2.3 km	MPC · JPL
664058	2008 CM_{224}	—	October 1, 2006	Kitt Peak	Spacewatch	·	1.7 km	MPC · JPL
664059	2008 CX_{224}	—	December 10, 2012	Haleakala	Pan-STARRS 1	·	1.9 km	MPC · JPL
664060	2008 CA_{225}	—	February 10, 2008	Catalina	CSS	·	1.9 km	MPC · JPL
664061	2008 CW_{226}	—	February 7, 2008	Mount Lemmon	Mount Lemmon Survey	·	1.6 km	MPC · JPL
664062	2008 CC_{228}	—	February 7, 2008	Mount Lemmon	Mount Lemmon Survey	·	1.0 km	MPC · JPL
664063	2008 CS_{228}	—	February 3, 2008	Mount Lemmon	Mount Lemmon Survey	·	1.7 km	MPC · JPL
664064	2008 CX_{228}	—	February 9, 2008	Mount Lemmon	Mount Lemmon Survey	·	1.4 km	MPC · JPL
664065	2008 CM_{232}	—	November 3, 2010	Mount Lemmon	Mount Lemmon Survey	V	510 m	MPC · JPL
664066	2008 CO_{233}	—	October 24, 2011	Haleakala	Pan-STARRS 1	·	1.6 km	MPC · JPL
664067	2008 CR_{233}	—	February 13, 2008	Kitt Peak	Spacewatch	·	1.9 km	MPC · JPL
664068	2008 CD_{236}	—	January 26, 2012	Kitt Peak	Spacewatch	·	1.2 km	MPC · JPL
664069	2008 CG_{238}	—	February 9, 2008	Mount Lemmon	Mount Lemmon Survey	·	980 m	MPC · JPL
664070	2008 CL_{238}	—	February 13, 2008	Kitt Peak	Spacewatch	EOS	1.7 km	MPC · JPL
664071	2008 CR_{238}	—	February 8, 2008	Kitt Peak	Spacewatch	·	530 m	MPC · JPL
664072	2008 CJ_{239}	—	February 7, 2008	Kitt Peak	Spacewatch	·	1.4 km	MPC · JPL
664073	2008 CJ_{240}	—	February 13, 2008	Mount Lemmon	Mount Lemmon Survey	·	640 m	MPC · JPL
664074	2008 CH_{244}	—	February 10, 2008	Kitt Peak	Spacewatch	·	520 m	MPC · JPL
664075	2008 CO_{245}	—	February 7, 2008	Kitt Peak	Spacewatch	·	2.4 km	MPC · JPL
664076	2008 CC_{246}	—	February 2, 2008	Kitt Peak	Spacewatch	H	390 m	MPC · JPL
664077	2008 CH_{250}	—	February 9, 2008	Mount Lemmon	Mount Lemmon Survey	·	1.8 km	MPC · JPL
664078	2008 DL_{5}	—	February 28, 2008	Catalina	CSS	APO	130 m	MPC · JPL
664079	2008 DL_{14}	—	February 9, 2008	Kitt Peak	Spacewatch	·	1.2 km	MPC · JPL
664080	2008 DN_{14}	—	February 3, 2008	Kitt Peak	Spacewatch	·	1.9 km	MPC · JPL
664081	2008 DR_{26}	—	February 28, 2008	Mount Lemmon	Mount Lemmon Survey	·	1.1 km	MPC · JPL
664082	2008 DM_{35}	—	February 27, 2008	Kitt Peak	Spacewatch	·	1.6 km	MPC · JPL
664083	2008 DZ_{41}	—	March 10, 2003	Kitt Peak	Spacewatch	·	1.9 km	MPC · JPL
664084	2008 DN_{42}	—	January 10, 2008	Kitt Peak	Spacewatch	·	1.6 km	MPC · JPL
664085	2008 DK_{43}	—	February 13, 2008	Kitt Peak	Spacewatch	·	630 m	MPC · JPL
664086	2008 DD_{45}	—	February 10, 2008	Kitt Peak	Spacewatch	EOS	1.7 km	MPC · JPL
664087	2008 DF_{46}	—	February 28, 2008	Mount Lemmon	Mount Lemmon Survey	·	1.8 km	MPC · JPL
664088	2008 DZ_{50}	—	December 17, 2007	Mount Lemmon	Mount Lemmon Survey	·	1.4 km	MPC · JPL
664089	2008 DM_{51}	—	February 29, 2008	Mount Lemmon	Mount Lemmon Survey	·	1.4 km	MPC · JPL
664090	2008 DZ_{53}	—	February 29, 2008	Mount Lemmon	Mount Lemmon Survey	·	2.0 km	MPC · JPL
664091	2008 DL_{60}	—	February 8, 2008	Kitt Peak	Spacewatch	·	2.4 km	MPC · JPL
664092	2008 DS_{61}	—	January 18, 2004	Kitt Peak	Spacewatch	V	620 m	MPC · JPL
664093	2008 DX_{62}	—	February 28, 2008	Mount Lemmon	Mount Lemmon Survey	·	1.5 km	MPC · JPL
664094	2008 DZ_{63}	—	February 13, 2008	Kitt Peak	Spacewatch	·	1.5 km	MPC · JPL
664095	2008 DF_{67}	—	February 29, 2008	Kitt Peak	Spacewatch	·	780 m	MPC · JPL
664096	2008 DX_{70}	—	November 18, 2007	Kitt Peak	Spacewatch	BRA	1.7 km	MPC · JPL
664097	2008 DV_{72}	—	February 11, 2008	Kitt Peak	Spacewatch	EOS	1.5 km	MPC · JPL
664098	2008 DM_{75}	—	February 28, 2008	Mount Lemmon	Mount Lemmon Survey	EOS	1.3 km	MPC · JPL
664099	2008 DE_{86}	—	February 28, 2008	Mount Lemmon	Mount Lemmon Survey	EOS	1.6 km	MPC · JPL
664100	2008 DM_{90}	—	February 24, 2008	Mount Lemmon	Mount Lemmon Survey	PHO	770 m	MPC · JPL

== 664101–664200 ==
back to top

Designation			Discovery			Properties		Ref
Permanent	Provisional	Named after	Date	Site	Discoverer(s)	Category	Diam.	Ref
664101	2008 DJ_{93}	—	February 24, 2008	Mount Lemmon	Mount Lemmon Survey	·	1.5 km	MPC · JPL
664102	2008 DR_{93}	—	February 28, 2008	Mount Lemmon	Mount Lemmon Survey	·	900 m	MPC · JPL
664103	2008 DH_{94}	—	January 10, 2013	Haleakala	Pan-STARRS 1	·	1.4 km	MPC · JPL
664104	2008 DM_{96}	—	February 24, 2008	Mount Lemmon	Mount Lemmon Survey	3:2 · SHU	4.0 km	MPC · JPL
664105	2008 DJ_{98}	—	February 28, 2008	Mount Lemmon	Mount Lemmon Survey	·	1.0 km	MPC · JPL
664106	2008 EV_{2}	—	December 29, 2003	Kitt Peak	Spacewatch	PHO	910 m	MPC · JPL
664107	2008 EC_{4}	—	March 1, 2008	Mount Lemmon	Mount Lemmon Survey	·	2.4 km	MPC · JPL
664108	2008 EQ_{4}	—	March 2, 2008	Mount Lemmon	Mount Lemmon Survey	·	650 m	MPC · JPL
664109	2008 EP_{8}	—	January 1, 2008	Mount Lemmon	Mount Lemmon Survey	·	1.3 km	MPC · JPL
664110	2008 EF_{10}	—	February 3, 2008	Kitt Peak	Spacewatch	·	800 m	MPC · JPL
664111	2008 ER_{17}	—	March 1, 2008	Kitt Peak	Spacewatch	EOS	1.8 km	MPC · JPL
664112	2008 EO_{18}	—	March 10, 2003	Kitt Peak	Spacewatch	EOS	1.7 km	MPC · JPL
664113	2008 EZ_{25}	—	January 10, 2008	Mount Lemmon	Mount Lemmon Survey	·	1.8 km	MPC · JPL
664114	2008 EX_{27}	—	March 4, 2008	Mount Lemmon	Mount Lemmon Survey	EOS	1.8 km	MPC · JPL
664115	2008 EZ_{29}	—	February 7, 2008	Kitt Peak	Spacewatch	·	1.2 km	MPC · JPL
664116	2008 EB_{30}	—	December 24, 2006	Mount Lemmon	Mount Lemmon Survey	·	2.0 km	MPC · JPL
664117	2008 EW_{42}	—	March 4, 2008	Mount Lemmon	Mount Lemmon Survey	·	2.1 km	MPC · JPL
664118	2008 EG_{44}	—	March 5, 2008	Kitt Peak	Spacewatch	THM	2.0 km	MPC · JPL
664119	2008 EY_{48}	—	February 10, 2008	Catalina	CSS	H	410 m	MPC · JPL
664120	2008 EQ_{53}	—	March 6, 2008	Kitt Peak	Spacewatch	T_{j} (2.96)	1.7 km	MPC · JPL
664121	2008 EK_{57}	—	January 11, 2008	Mount Lemmon	Mount Lemmon Survey	·	1.8 km	MPC · JPL
664122	2008 EO_{67}	—	September 30, 2005	Kitt Peak	Spacewatch	EOS	1.8 km	MPC · JPL
664123	2008 EU_{70}	—	March 5, 2008	Mount Lemmon	Mount Lemmon Survey	·	2.1 km	MPC · JPL
664124	2008 EW_{76}	—	March 7, 2008	Kitt Peak	Spacewatch	·	510 m	MPC · JPL
664125	2008 EH_{98}	—	March 1, 2008	Catalina	CSS	JUN	1.2 km	MPC · JPL
664126	2008 EN_{102}	—	March 5, 2008	Mount Lemmon	Mount Lemmon Survey	EOS	1.5 km	MPC · JPL
664127	2008 EX_{106}	—	March 6, 2008	Mount Lemmon	Mount Lemmon Survey	·	1.1 km	MPC · JPL
664128	2008 EU_{115}	—	March 8, 2008	Mount Lemmon	Mount Lemmon Survey	EOS	1.5 km	MPC · JPL
664129	2008 EZ_{126}	—	March 10, 2008	Kitt Peak	Spacewatch	·	1.7 km	MPC · JPL
664130	2008 EM_{131}	—	March 11, 2008	Kitt Peak	Spacewatch	EOS	1.6 km	MPC · JPL
664131	2008 ES_{135}	—	March 11, 2008	Kitt Peak	Spacewatch	·	1.4 km	MPC · JPL
664132	2008 EV_{135}	—	March 11, 2008	Kitt Peak	Spacewatch	·	670 m	MPC · JPL
664133	2008 EJ_{138}	—	June 17, 2005	Mount Lemmon	Mount Lemmon Survey	·	1.1 km	MPC · JPL
664134	2008 EG_{141}	—	March 12, 2008	Kitt Peak	Spacewatch	·	1.8 km	MPC · JPL
664135	2008 EJ_{141}	—	March 12, 2008	Catalina	CSS	·	1.9 km	MPC · JPL
664136 Tercu	2008 EM_{144}	Tercu	March 11, 2008	La Silla	EURONEAR	·	1.0 km	MPC · JPL
664137	2008 EE_{157}	—	March 28, 2008	Mount Lemmon	Mount Lemmon Survey	·	2.4 km	MPC · JPL
664138	2008 ER_{163}	—	March 12, 2008	Mount Lemmon	Mount Lemmon Survey	·	1.6 km	MPC · JPL
664139	2008 EQ_{171}	—	March 1, 2008	Kitt Peak	Spacewatch	·	1.0 km	MPC · JPL
664140	2008 EQ_{172}	—	October 25, 2011	Haleakala	Pan-STARRS 1	·	2.0 km	MPC · JPL
664141	2008 EZ_{172}	—	April 30, 2014	Haleakala	Pan-STARRS 1	EOS	1.9 km	MPC · JPL
664142	2008 EG_{173}	—	March 13, 2008	Kitt Peak	Spacewatch	EUP	2.7 km	MPC · JPL
664143	2008 EU_{173}	—	February 5, 2013	Kitt Peak	Spacewatch	·	1.5 km	MPC · JPL
664144	2008 EK_{174}	—	January 8, 2016	Haleakala	Pan-STARRS 1	·	710 m	MPC · JPL
664145	2008 EG_{176}	—	March 2, 2008	Mount Lemmon	Mount Lemmon Survey	·	970 m	MPC · JPL
664146	2008 EP_{176}	—	September 26, 2011	Haleakala	Pan-STARRS 1	·	1.5 km	MPC · JPL
664147	2008 EU_{179}	—	May 15, 2015	Haleakala	Pan-STARRS 1	·	540 m	MPC · JPL
664148	2008 EW_{179}	—	December 23, 2012	Haleakala	Pan-STARRS 1	EOS	1.5 km	MPC · JPL
664149	2008 EW_{180}	—	January 12, 2008	Kitt Peak	Spacewatch	3:2	5.0 km	MPC · JPL
664150	2008 EV_{181}	—	March 12, 2008	Kitt Peak	Spacewatch	·	2.2 km	MPC · JPL
664151	2008 EL_{182}	—	February 7, 2013	Kitt Peak	Spacewatch	EOS	1.5 km	MPC · JPL
664152	2008 EO_{182}	—	July 29, 2014	Haleakala	Pan-STARRS 1	·	1.3 km	MPC · JPL
664153	2008 EL_{185}	—	March 11, 2008	Kitt Peak	Spacewatch	·	1.8 km	MPC · JPL
664154	2008 EX_{185}	—	September 10, 2010	Kitt Peak	Spacewatch	AGN	890 m	MPC · JPL
664155	2008 EF_{187}	—	March 16, 2012	Mount Lemmon	Mount Lemmon Survey	·	1.2 km	MPC · JPL
664156	2008 EU_{188}	—	February 28, 2008	Mount Lemmon	Mount Lemmon Survey	EOS	1.7 km	MPC · JPL
664157	2008 EW_{188}	—	March 4, 2008	Kitt Peak	Spacewatch	TIR	2.2 km	MPC · JPL
664158	2008 EE_{190}	—	March 12, 2008	Kitt Peak	Spacewatch	L5	7.7 km	MPC · JPL
664159	2008 EX_{190}	—	March 14, 2008	Mauna Kea	Draginda, A.	·	1.3 km	MPC · JPL
664160	2008 EV_{191}	—	March 11, 2008	Catalina	CSS	BRA	1.5 km	MPC · JPL
664161	2008 EH_{193}	—	March 6, 2008	Mount Lemmon	Mount Lemmon Survey	·	1.5 km	MPC · JPL
664162	2008 EP_{193}	—	March 13, 2008	Kitt Peak	Spacewatch	KOR	1.1 km	MPC · JPL
664163	2008 EQ_{194}	—	March 1, 2008	Kitt Peak	Spacewatch	·	2.2 km	MPC · JPL
664164	2008 EO_{196}	—	March 15, 2008	Kitt Peak	Spacewatch	·	2.2 km	MPC · JPL
664165	2008 FR	—	March 20, 2001	Kitt Peak	Spacewatch	MAS	730 m	MPC · JPL
664166	2008 FY_{3}	—	March 25, 2008	Kitt Peak	Spacewatch	·	1.6 km	MPC · JPL
664167	2008 FS_{5}	—	March 6, 2008	Mount Lemmon	Mount Lemmon Survey	·	1.1 km	MPC · JPL
664168	2008 FW_{7}	—	September 20, 1995	Kitt Peak	Spacewatch	·	1.7 km	MPC · JPL
664169	2008 FZ_{8}	—	February 26, 2008	Mount Lemmon	Mount Lemmon Survey	·	1.6 km	MPC · JPL
664170	2008 FD_{9}	—	February 26, 2008	Mount Lemmon	Mount Lemmon Survey	·	1.1 km	MPC · JPL
664171	2008 FZ_{11}	—	February 8, 2008	Kitt Peak	Spacewatch	·	1.4 km	MPC · JPL
664172	2008 FZ_{17}	—	March 8, 2008	Mount Lemmon	Mount Lemmon Survey	EOS	1.8 km	MPC · JPL
664173	2008 FX_{18}	—	March 27, 2008	Mount Lemmon	Mount Lemmon Survey	·	1.9 km	MPC · JPL
664174	2008 FZ_{19}	—	March 27, 2008	Mount Lemmon	Mount Lemmon Survey	·	1.9 km	MPC · JPL
664175	2008 FS_{22}	—	March 27, 2008	Kitt Peak	Spacewatch	·	1.3 km	MPC · JPL
664176	2008 FU_{23}	—	March 5, 2008	Mount Lemmon	Mount Lemmon Survey	·	1.4 km	MPC · JPL
664177	2008 FK_{35}	—	March 8, 2008	Mount Lemmon	Mount Lemmon Survey	·	1.5 km	MPC · JPL
664178	2008 FF_{37}	—	February 10, 2008	Mount Lemmon	Mount Lemmon Survey	·	960 m	MPC · JPL
664179	2008 FU_{40}	—	March 28, 2008	Kitt Peak	Spacewatch	·	2.2 km	MPC · JPL
664180	2008 FW_{43}	—	March 28, 2008	Mount Lemmon	Mount Lemmon Survey	EOS	1.6 km	MPC · JPL
664181	2008 FF_{44}	—	March 28, 2008	Mount Lemmon	Mount Lemmon Survey	·	490 m	MPC · JPL
664182	2008 FT_{48}	—	March 1, 2008	Kitt Peak	Spacewatch	·	1.6 km	MPC · JPL
664183	2008 FV_{56}	—	March 28, 2008	Mount Lemmon	Mount Lemmon Survey	·	1.8 km	MPC · JPL
664184	2008 FV_{57}	—	March 28, 2008	Mount Lemmon	Mount Lemmon Survey	·	530 m	MPC · JPL
664185	2008 FD_{65}	—	April 11, 2003	Kitt Peak	Spacewatch	·	1.8 km	MPC · JPL
664186	2008 FJ_{66}	—	March 28, 2008	Kitt Peak	Spacewatch	THM	1.7 km	MPC · JPL
664187	2008 FB_{69}	—	March 28, 2008	Mount Lemmon	Mount Lemmon Survey	·	3.3 km	MPC · JPL
664188	2008 FY_{72}	—	March 30, 2008	Kitt Peak	Spacewatch	·	500 m	MPC · JPL
664189	2008 FN_{74}	—	March 31, 2008	Mount Lemmon	Mount Lemmon Survey	MAR	940 m	MPC · JPL
664190	2008 FK_{78}	—	March 27, 2008	Mount Lemmon	Mount Lemmon Survey	KOR	990 m	MPC · JPL
664191	2008 FM_{84}	—	February 29, 2008	Kitt Peak	Spacewatch	·	1.8 km	MPC · JPL
664192	2008 FD_{85}	—	March 28, 2008	Mount Lemmon	Mount Lemmon Survey	·	1.5 km	MPC · JPL
664193	2008 FP_{85}	—	March 28, 2008	Mount Lemmon	Mount Lemmon Survey	·	550 m	MPC · JPL
664194	2008 FZ_{91}	—	March 29, 2008	Mount Lemmon	Mount Lemmon Survey	·	1.6 km	MPC · JPL
664195	2008 FH_{97}	—	March 13, 2008	Kitt Peak	Spacewatch	·	470 m	MPC · JPL
664196	2008 FG_{98}	—	June 3, 2003	Kitt Peak	Spacewatch	·	2.4 km	MPC · JPL
664197	2008 FP_{99}	—	March 30, 2008	Kitt Peak	Spacewatch	·	2.4 km	MPC · JPL
664198	2008 FE_{108}	—	March 31, 2008	Mount Lemmon	Mount Lemmon Survey	·	2.0 km	MPC · JPL
664199	2008 FB_{110}	—	March 31, 2008	Mount Lemmon	Mount Lemmon Survey	·	780 m	MPC · JPL
664200	2008 FE_{110}	—	March 31, 2008	Mount Lemmon	Mount Lemmon Survey	·	1.6 km	MPC · JPL

== 664201–664300 ==
back to top

Designation			Discovery			Properties		Ref
Permanent	Provisional	Named after	Date	Site	Discoverer(s)	Category	Diam.	Ref
664201	2008 FA_{115}	—	March 31, 2008	Mount Lemmon	Mount Lemmon Survey	·	2.0 km	MPC · JPL
664202	2008 FU_{115}	—	March 31, 2008	Mount Lemmon	Mount Lemmon Survey	KOR	1.1 km	MPC · JPL
664203	2008 FM_{119}	—	March 31, 2008	Mount Lemmon	Mount Lemmon Survey	·	2.1 km	MPC · JPL
664204	2008 FG_{120}	—	March 31, 2008	Mount Lemmon	Mount Lemmon Survey	·	1.8 km	MPC · JPL
664205	2008 FU_{132}	—	March 29, 2008	Kitt Peak	Spacewatch	·	530 m	MPC · JPL
664206	2008 FY_{138}	—	March 29, 2008	Mount Lemmon	Mount Lemmon Survey	·	970 m	MPC · JPL
664207	2008 FL_{139}	—	December 8, 2010	Mount Lemmon	Mount Lemmon Survey	PHO	890 m	MPC · JPL
664208	2008 FE_{140}	—	December 13, 2015	Haleakala	Pan-STARRS 1	·	1.3 km	MPC · JPL
664209	2008 FG_{140}	—	March 6, 2016	Haleakala	Pan-STARRS 1	·	1.1 km	MPC · JPL
664210	2008 FH_{140}	—	March 14, 2012	Mount Lemmon	Mount Lemmon Survey	HNS	780 m	MPC · JPL
664211	2008 FK_{140}	—	August 8, 2013	Kitt Peak	Spacewatch	·	1.0 km	MPC · JPL
664212	2008 FR_{140}	—	March 30, 2008	Kitt Peak	Spacewatch	·	2.2 km	MPC · JPL
664213	2008 FV_{140}	—	September 22, 2017	Haleakala	Pan-STARRS 1	·	1.9 km	MPC · JPL
664214	2008 FH_{142}	—	December 20, 2017	Mount Lemmon	Mount Lemmon Survey	H	450 m	MPC · JPL
664215	2008 FR_{142}	—	June 15, 2015	Mount Lemmon	Mount Lemmon Survey	·	550 m	MPC · JPL
664216	2008 FZ_{143}	—	November 27, 2014	Haleakala	Pan-STARRS 1	·	980 m	MPC · JPL
664217	2008 FB_{144}	—	August 21, 2015	Haleakala	Pan-STARRS 1	·	1.6 km	MPC · JPL
664218	2008 FV_{144}	—	March 30, 2008	Kitt Peak	Spacewatch	·	460 m	MPC · JPL
664219	2008 FK_{145}	—	March 29, 2008	Kitt Peak	Spacewatch	·	1.6 km	MPC · JPL
664220	2008 GV_{3}	—	April 7, 2008	Catalina	CSS	T_{j} (2.49) · APO	730 m	MPC · JPL
664221	2008 GU_{11}	—	April 1, 2008	Kitt Peak	Spacewatch	·	2.2 km	MPC · JPL
664222	2008 GB_{14}	—	July 30, 2005	Palomar	NEAT	MAS	760 m	MPC · JPL
664223	2008 GU_{18}	—	April 4, 2008	Mount Lemmon	Mount Lemmon Survey	EUN	1.4 km	MPC · JPL
664224	2008 GW_{19}	—	April 4, 2008	Mount Lemmon	Mount Lemmon Survey	TIR	2.9 km	MPC · JPL
664225	2008 GH_{21}	—	March 29, 2008	Kitt Peak	Spacewatch	·	930 m	MPC · JPL
664226	2008 GW_{21}	—	March 14, 2008	Catalina	CSS	·	1.7 km	MPC · JPL
664227	2008 GN_{25}	—	October 12, 2005	Kitt Peak	Spacewatch	·	1.7 km	MPC · JPL
664228	2008 GY_{25}	—	April 1, 2008	Mount Lemmon	Mount Lemmon Survey	·	2.1 km	MPC · JPL
664229	2008 GF_{29}	—	March 13, 2008	Kitt Peak	Spacewatch	·	470 m	MPC · JPL
664230	2008 GF_{30}	—	October 7, 2005	Mount Lemmon	Mount Lemmon Survey	·	2.4 km	MPC · JPL
664231	2008 GQ_{33}	—	March 15, 2008	Mount Lemmon	Mount Lemmon Survey	·	2.0 km	MPC · JPL
664232	2008 GT_{35}	—	April 3, 2008	Mount Lemmon	Mount Lemmon Survey	·	1.6 km	MPC · JPL
664233	2008 GD_{37}	—	April 3, 2008	Mount Lemmon	Mount Lemmon Survey	·	2.5 km	MPC · JPL
664234	2008 GN_{41}	—	March 31, 2008	Kitt Peak	Spacewatch	·	1.3 km	MPC · JPL
664235	2008 GC_{42}	—	March 5, 2008	Mount Lemmon	Mount Lemmon Survey	·	1.2 km	MPC · JPL
664236	2008 GO_{43}	—	October 7, 2005	Mount Lemmon	Mount Lemmon Survey	·	2.1 km	MPC · JPL
664237	2008 GT_{47}	—	November 26, 2005	Kitt Peak	Spacewatch	·	3.0 km	MPC · JPL
664238	2008 GS_{53}	—	April 5, 2008	Mount Lemmon	Mount Lemmon Survey	·	2.1 km	MPC · JPL
664239	2008 GY_{53}	—	March 28, 2008	Mount Lemmon	Mount Lemmon Survey	·	2.0 km	MPC · JPL
664240	2008 GA_{54}	—	April 5, 2008	Mount Lemmon	Mount Lemmon Survey	·	2.7 km	MPC · JPL
664241	2008 GC_{56}	—	April 5, 2008	Mount Lemmon	Mount Lemmon Survey	·	2.3 km	MPC · JPL
664242	2008 GO_{57}	—	March 10, 2008	Kitt Peak	Spacewatch	·	2.6 km	MPC · JPL
664243	2008 GR_{57}	—	September 19, 2001	Kitt Peak	Spacewatch	(5)	1.0 km	MPC · JPL
664244	2008 GW_{57}	—	April 5, 2008	Mount Lemmon	Mount Lemmon Survey	·	1.7 km	MPC · JPL
664245	2008 GZ_{60}	—	April 5, 2008	Mount Lemmon	Mount Lemmon Survey	·	2.7 km	MPC · JPL
664246	2008 GB_{66}	—	April 6, 2008	Mount Lemmon	Mount Lemmon Survey	·	880 m	MPC · JPL
664247	2008 GZ_{67}	—	April 6, 2008	Mount Lemmon	Mount Lemmon Survey	EUP	2.7 km	MPC · JPL
664248	2008 GC_{71}	—	March 10, 2008	Mount Lemmon	Mount Lemmon Survey	·	2.6 km	MPC · JPL
664249	2008 GG_{71}	—	April 7, 2008	Mount Lemmon	Mount Lemmon Survey	EOS	2.0 km	MPC · JPL
664250	2008 GJ_{78}	—	June 17, 2004	Siding Spring	SSS	JUN	880 m	MPC · JPL
664251	2008 GD_{82}	—	October 22, 2005	Kitt Peak	Spacewatch	·	2.6 km	MPC · JPL
664252	2008 GQ_{85}	—	March 7, 2008	Kitt Peak	Spacewatch	WIT	1.1 km	MPC · JPL
664253	2008 GX_{91}	—	March 28, 2008	Mount Lemmon	Mount Lemmon Survey	·	1.8 km	MPC · JPL
664254	2008 GX_{103}	—	March 28, 2008	Kitt Peak	Spacewatch	·	540 m	MPC · JPL
664255	2008 GW_{115}	—	April 11, 2008	Catalina	CSS	·	2.6 km	MPC · JPL
664256	2008 GR_{117}	—	March 30, 2008	Kitt Peak	Spacewatch	·	2.9 km	MPC · JPL
664257	2008 GM_{121}	—	March 31, 2008	Kitt Peak	Spacewatch	·	1.2 km	MPC · JPL
664258	2008 GL_{124}	—	April 14, 2008	Mount Lemmon	Mount Lemmon Survey	·	960 m	MPC · JPL
664259	2008 GQ_{125}	—	April 14, 2008	Mount Lemmon	Mount Lemmon Survey	·	2.0 km	MPC · JPL
664260	2008 GU_{125}	—	April 14, 2008	Mount Lemmon	Mount Lemmon Survey	·	830 m	MPC · JPL
664261	2008 GH_{126}	—	March 30, 2008	Kitt Peak	Spacewatch	·	760 m	MPC · JPL
664262	2008 GR_{127}	—	April 14, 2008	Mount Lemmon	Mount Lemmon Survey	·	1.2 km	MPC · JPL
664263	2008 GK_{136}	—	April 1, 2008	Kitt Peak	Spacewatch	3:2	5.0 km	MPC · JPL
664264	2008 GS_{136}	—	April 6, 2008	Mount Lemmon	Mount Lemmon Survey	·	1.2 km	MPC · JPL
664265	2008 GL_{137}	—	April 6, 2008	Kitt Peak	Spacewatch	·	2.7 km	MPC · JPL
664266	2008 GO_{137}	—	April 6, 2008	Kitt Peak	Spacewatch	·	530 m	MPC · JPL
664267	2008 GO_{138}	—	March 11, 2008	Mount Lemmon	Mount Lemmon Survey	·	2.4 km	MPC · JPL
664268	2008 GC_{139}	—	April 1, 2008	Mount Lemmon	Mount Lemmon Survey	·	2.6 km	MPC · JPL
664269	2008 GP_{139}	—	April 5, 2008	Kitt Peak	Spacewatch	·	2.4 km	MPC · JPL
664270	2008 GB_{141}	—	April 1, 2008	Kitt Peak	Spacewatch	·	520 m	MPC · JPL
664271	2008 GN_{147}	—	March 31, 2008	Kitt Peak	Spacewatch	·	1.3 km	MPC · JPL
664272	2008 GO_{148}	—	March 14, 2013	Kitt Peak	Spacewatch	·	1.8 km	MPC · JPL
664273	2008 GL_{149}	—	July 30, 2005	Palomar	NEAT	·	1.3 km	MPC · JPL
664274	2008 GX_{149}	—	November 17, 2011	Kitt Peak	Spacewatch	·	2.6 km	MPC · JPL
664275	2008 GA_{150}	—	April 3, 2008	Mount Lemmon	Mount Lemmon Survey	·	2.5 km	MPC · JPL
664276	2008 GJ_{150}	—	April 4, 2008	Kitt Peak	Spacewatch	(5)	1.3 km	MPC · JPL
664277	2008 GQ_{150}	—	August 27, 2009	Catalina	CSS	PHO	860 m	MPC · JPL
664278	2008 GR_{150}	—	April 1, 2008	Mount Lemmon	Mount Lemmon Survey	·	2.2 km	MPC · JPL
664279	2008 GY_{150}	—	April 15, 2008	Mount Lemmon	Mount Lemmon Survey	·	2.5 km	MPC · JPL
664280	2008 GR_{151}	—	November 21, 2014	Haleakala	Pan-STARRS 1	·	1.4 km	MPC · JPL
664281	2008 GU_{151}	—	March 10, 2016	Haleakala	Pan-STARRS 1	·	850 m	MPC · JPL
664282	2008 GX_{151}	—	April 6, 2008	Kitt Peak	Spacewatch	·	2.7 km	MPC · JPL
664283	2008 GS_{152}	—	October 12, 2009	Mount Lemmon	Mount Lemmon Survey	H	520 m	MPC · JPL
664284	2008 GL_{153}	—	September 17, 2009	Kitt Peak	Spacewatch	·	690 m	MPC · JPL
664285	2008 GU_{157}	—	April 12, 2008	Kitt Peak	Spacewatch	·	2.9 km	MPC · JPL
664286	2008 GM_{158}	—	May 8, 2014	Haleakala	Pan-STARRS 1	·	2.7 km	MPC · JPL
664287	2008 GO_{159}	—	April 14, 2008	Kitt Peak	Spacewatch	·	2.4 km	MPC · JPL
664288	2008 GW_{159}	—	April 4, 2008	Catalina	CSS	·	1.0 km	MPC · JPL
664289	2008 GS_{160}	—	April 3, 2008	Catalina	CSS	T_{j} (2.98)	2.8 km	MPC · JPL
664290	2008 GW_{160}	—	April 7, 2008	Kitt Peak	Spacewatch	·	650 m	MPC · JPL
664291	2008 GE_{161}	—	January 20, 2018	Mount Lemmon	Mount Lemmon Survey	·	2.3 km	MPC · JPL
664292	2008 GM_{161}	—	March 6, 2008	Mount Lemmon	Mount Lemmon Survey	TIR	2.2 km	MPC · JPL
664293	2008 GS_{162}	—	May 10, 2014	Haleakala	Pan-STARRS 1	EOS	1.8 km	MPC · JPL
664294	2008 GR_{163}	—	July 25, 2015	Haleakala	Pan-STARRS 1	·	2.4 km	MPC · JPL
664295	2008 GT_{163}	—	April 8, 2008	Kitt Peak	Spacewatch	·	2.1 km	MPC · JPL
664296	2008 GC_{165}	—	April 7, 2008	Catalina	CSS	·	1.5 km	MPC · JPL
664297	2008 GE_{165}	—	April 5, 2008	Catalina	CSS	·	2.1 km	MPC · JPL
664298	2008 GQ_{165}	—	April 6, 2008	Mount Lemmon	Mount Lemmon Survey	·	2.5 km	MPC · JPL
664299	2008 GL_{166}	—	October 2, 2014	Haleakala	Pan-STARRS 1	·	910 m	MPC · JPL
664300	2008 GB_{168}	—	April 7, 2008	Mount Lemmon	Mount Lemmon Survey	·	2.3 km	MPC · JPL

== 664301–664400 ==
back to top

Designation			Discovery			Properties		Ref
Permanent	Provisional	Named after	Date	Site	Discoverer(s)	Category	Diam.	Ref
664301	2008 GM_{172}	—	April 5, 2008	Mount Lemmon	Mount Lemmon Survey	·	1.2 km	MPC · JPL
664302	2008 GT_{172}	—	April 14, 2008	Mount Lemmon	Mount Lemmon Survey	·	2.6 km	MPC · JPL
664303	2008 GW_{174}	—	April 14, 2008	Mount Lemmon	Mount Lemmon Survey	·	1.1 km	MPC · JPL
664304	2008 GU_{175}	—	April 11, 2008	Mount Lemmon	Mount Lemmon Survey	EOS	1.5 km	MPC · JPL
664305	2008 GA_{176}	—	April 14, 2008	Mount Lemmon	Mount Lemmon Survey	·	2.7 km	MPC · JPL
664306	2008 GN_{177}	—	April 14, 2008	Mount Lemmon	Mount Lemmon Survey	·	1.7 km	MPC · JPL
664307	2008 GB_{178}	—	April 6, 2008	Kitt Peak	Spacewatch	·	2.1 km	MPC · JPL
664308	2008 HX_{2}	—	March 17, 2001	Kitt Peak	Spacewatch	·	930 m	MPC · JPL
664309	2008 HC_{7}	—	March 13, 2008	Kitt Peak	Spacewatch	·	600 m	MPC · JPL
664310	2008 HH_{8}	—	March 31, 2008	Mount Lemmon	Mount Lemmon Survey	·	1.9 km	MPC · JPL
664311	2008 HF_{16}	—	December 4, 2005	Kitt Peak	Spacewatch	·	3.0 km	MPC · JPL
664312	2008 HH_{20}	—	April 26, 2008	Mount Lemmon	Mount Lemmon Survey	·	700 m	MPC · JPL
664313	2008 HG_{23}	—	April 24, 2008	Mount Lemmon	Mount Lemmon Survey	·	640 m	MPC · JPL
664314	2008 HA_{24}	—	April 27, 2008	Kitt Peak	Spacewatch	·	860 m	MPC · JPL
664315	2008 HQ_{26}	—	April 27, 2008	Mount Lemmon	Mount Lemmon Survey	·	730 m	MPC · JPL
664316	2008 HR_{26}	—	April 6, 2008	Kitt Peak	Spacewatch	·	860 m	MPC · JPL
664317	2008 HV_{26}	—	April 13, 2008	Kitt Peak	Spacewatch	·	500 m	MPC · JPL
664318	2008 HX_{28}	—	April 6, 2008	Mount Lemmon	Mount Lemmon Survey	·	920 m	MPC · JPL
664319	2008 HT_{29}	—	April 11, 2008	Mount Lemmon	Mount Lemmon Survey	·	2.3 km	MPC · JPL
664320	2008 HW_{31}	—	March 29, 2008	Kitt Peak	Spacewatch	L5	5.7 km	MPC · JPL
664321	2008 HJ_{32}	—	January 5, 2006	Mount Lemmon	Mount Lemmon Survey	(159)	2.4 km	MPC · JPL
664322	2008 HT_{37}	—	September 13, 2005	Kitt Peak	Spacewatch	(895)	3.9 km	MPC · JPL
664323	2008 HU_{38}	—	April 13, 2008	Kitt Peak	Spacewatch	·	1.2 km	MPC · JPL
664324	2008 HM_{42}	—	April 11, 2008	Mount Lemmon	Mount Lemmon Survey	·	960 m	MPC · JPL
664325	2008 HP_{43}	—	April 27, 2008	Mount Lemmon	Mount Lemmon Survey	·	1.1 km	MPC · JPL
664326	2008 HT_{48}	—	September 7, 2004	Kitt Peak	Spacewatch	·	2.6 km	MPC · JPL
664327	2008 HC_{53}	—	April 6, 2008	Mount Lemmon	Mount Lemmon Survey	·	3.4 km	MPC · JPL
664328	2008 HN_{54}	—	April 29, 2008	Kitt Peak	Spacewatch	·	1.3 km	MPC · JPL
664329	2008 HP_{59}	—	April 1, 2008	Kitt Peak	Spacewatch	·	2.5 km	MPC · JPL
664330	2008 HW_{59}	—	December 8, 2005	Kitt Peak	Spacewatch	·	2.9 km	MPC · JPL
664331	2008 HV_{62}	—	October 23, 2006	Mount Lemmon	Mount Lemmon Survey	EOS	1.9 km	MPC · JPL
664332	2008 HP_{64}	—	April 30, 2008	Kitt Peak	Spacewatch	·	1.5 km	MPC · JPL
664333	2008 HL_{71}	—	October 30, 2005	Kitt Peak	Spacewatch	·	2.5 km	MPC · JPL
664334	2008 HW_{71}	—	April 8, 2013	Mount Lemmon	Mount Lemmon Survey	·	2.3 km	MPC · JPL
664335	2008 HZ_{71}	—	April 28, 2008	Kitt Peak	Spacewatch	·	1 km	MPC · JPL
664336	2008 HM_{72}	—	December 10, 2014	Mount Lemmon	Mount Lemmon Survey	(5)	1.1 km	MPC · JPL
664337	2008 HY_{73}	—	March 20, 2013	Mount Lemmon	Mount Lemmon Survey	TIR	2.7 km	MPC · JPL
664338	2008 HA_{74}	—	October 12, 2015	Haleakala	Pan-STARRS 1	·	2.0 km	MPC · JPL
664339	2008 HG_{74}	—	November 3, 2016	Haleakala	Pan-STARRS 1	EOS	1.5 km	MPC · JPL
664340	2008 HA_{75}	—	November 15, 2011	Mount Lemmon	Mount Lemmon Survey	·	2.5 km	MPC · JPL
664341	2008 HP_{75}	—	February 15, 2013	Haleakala	Pan-STARRS 1	EOS	1.4 km	MPC · JPL
664342	2008 HU_{75}	—	November 12, 2010	Mount Lemmon	Mount Lemmon Survey	·	2.2 km	MPC · JPL
664343	2008 HG_{76}	—	February 9, 2016	Haleakala	Pan-STARRS 1	·	690 m	MPC · JPL
664344	2008 HE_{77}	—	April 29, 2008	Mount Lemmon	Mount Lemmon Survey	·	1.5 km	MPC · JPL
664345	2008 HM_{77}	—	April 28, 2008	Kitt Peak	Spacewatch	L5	6.8 km	MPC · JPL
664346	2008 JQ_{19}	—	March 27, 2008	Kitt Peak	Spacewatch	·	500 m	MPC · JPL
664347	2008 JA_{22}	—	March 31, 2008	Mount Lemmon	Mount Lemmon Survey	·	3.3 km	MPC · JPL
664348	2008 JV_{27}	—	May 8, 2008	Kitt Peak	Spacewatch	·	2.8 km	MPC · JPL
664349	2008 JG_{32}	—	May 7, 2008	Kitt Peak	Spacewatch	·	860 m	MPC · JPL
664350	2008 JF_{34}	—	May 3, 2008	Socorro	LINEAR	·	1.7 km	MPC · JPL
664351	2008 JA_{35}	—	February 21, 2007	Mount Lemmon	Mount Lemmon Survey	·	2.9 km	MPC · JPL
664352	2008 JQ_{37}	—	May 3, 2008	Siding Spring	SSS	T_{j} (2.97)	4.4 km	MPC · JPL
664353	2008 JJ_{38}	—	November 1, 2005	Kitt Peak	Spacewatch	MAR	870 m	MPC · JPL
664354	2008 JL_{42}	—	May 3, 2008	Kitt Peak	Spacewatch	VER	2.4 km	MPC · JPL
664355	2008 JX_{42}	—	May 3, 2008	Mount Lemmon	Mount Lemmon Survey	·	2.5 km	MPC · JPL
664356	2008 JW_{45}	—	May 14, 2008	Mount Lemmon	Mount Lemmon Survey	·	2.3 km	MPC · JPL
664357	2008 JO_{46}	—	January 1, 2014	Kitt Peak	Spacewatch	·	680 m	MPC · JPL
664358	2008 JG_{47}	—	May 5, 2008	Mount Lemmon	Mount Lemmon Survey	·	530 m	MPC · JPL
664359	2008 JN_{47}	—	August 10, 2016	Haleakala	Pan-STARRS 1	·	2.5 km	MPC · JPL
664360	2008 JY_{47}	—	September 1, 2013	Catalina	CSS	·	1.3 km	MPC · JPL
664361	2008 JT_{48}	—	November 2, 2010	Mount Lemmon	Mount Lemmon Survey	VER	2.1 km	MPC · JPL
664362	2008 JN_{50}	—	May 3, 2008	Mount Lemmon	Mount Lemmon Survey	·	2.2 km	MPC · JPL
664363	2008 JB_{52}	—	May 1, 2008	Catalina	CSS	·	1.8 km	MPC · JPL
664364	2008 JP_{52}	—	May 7, 2008	Kitt Peak	Spacewatch	·	1.3 km	MPC · JPL
664365	2008 JY_{52}	—	May 8, 2008	Kitt Peak	Spacewatch	·	1.2 km	MPC · JPL
664366	2008 KV	—	April 15, 2008	Mount Lemmon	Mount Lemmon Survey	·	1.8 km	MPC · JPL
664367	2008 KD_{3}	—	August 5, 2005	Palomar	NEAT	·	590 m	MPC · JPL
664368	2008 KR_{4}	—	May 27, 2008	Kitt Peak	Spacewatch	·	2.8 km	MPC · JPL
664369	2008 KJ_{5}	—	May 28, 2008	Kitt Peak	Spacewatch	MAR	1.0 km	MPC · JPL
664370	2008 KP_{11}	—	May 25, 2008	Piszkéstető	K. Sárneczky	·	1.7 km	MPC · JPL
664371	2008 KW_{11}	—	May 28, 2008	Desert Eagle	W. K. Y. Yeung	·	3.1 km	MPC · JPL
664372	2008 KC_{25}	—	April 14, 2008	Mount Lemmon	Mount Lemmon Survey	·	1.5 km	MPC · JPL
664373	2008 KG_{33}	—	May 29, 2008	Kitt Peak	Spacewatch	·	1.0 km	MPC · JPL
664374	2008 KB_{34}	—	May 30, 2008	Mount Lemmon	Mount Lemmon Survey	·	1.4 km	MPC · JPL
664375	2008 KJ_{35}	—	May 4, 2008	Kitt Peak	Spacewatch	·	630 m	MPC · JPL
664376	2008 KV_{37}	—	April 27, 2008	Kitt Peak	Spacewatch	JUN	700 m	MPC · JPL
664377	2008 KF_{39}	—	May 30, 2008	Kitt Peak	Spacewatch	·	2.1 km	MPC · JPL
664378	2008 KD_{42}	—	May 31, 2008	Kitt Peak	Spacewatch	·	1.6 km	MPC · JPL
664379	2008 KZ_{43}	—	October 8, 2015	Mount Lemmon	Mount Lemmon Survey	·	2.7 km	MPC · JPL
664380	2008 KY_{44}	—	January 14, 2012	Mount Lemmon	Mount Lemmon Survey	(8737)	2.9 km	MPC · JPL
664381	2008 KA_{45}	—	October 17, 2010	Mount Lemmon	Mount Lemmon Survey	·	2.8 km	MPC · JPL
664382	2008 KT_{45}	—	April 10, 2016	Haleakala	Pan-STARRS 1	·	1.3 km	MPC · JPL
664383	2008 KK_{46}	—	April 6, 2013	Mount Lemmon	Mount Lemmon Survey	·	2.3 km	MPC · JPL
664384	2008 KA_{47}	—	September 23, 2015	Haleakala	Pan-STARRS 1	·	2.2 km	MPC · JPL
664385	2008 KT_{48}	—	May 28, 2008	Mount Lemmon	Mount Lemmon Survey	·	2.7 km	MPC · JPL
664386	2008 LV_{3}	—	June 2, 2008	Mount Lemmon	Mount Lemmon Survey	EUN	1.2 km	MPC · JPL
664387	2008 LW_{3}	—	May 5, 2008	Kitt Peak	Spacewatch	·	860 m	MPC · JPL
664388	2008 LK_{4}	—	October 1, 2005	Kitt Peak	Spacewatch	MAS	720 m	MPC · JPL
664389	2008 LY_{5}	—	April 3, 2008	Kitt Peak	Spacewatch	·	1.4 km	MPC · JPL
664390	2008 LV_{6}	—	June 3, 2008	Kitt Peak	Spacewatch	·	1.9 km	MPC · JPL
664391	2008 LW_{7}	—	June 4, 2008	Kitt Peak	Spacewatch	·	1.6 km	MPC · JPL
664392	2008 LQ_{11}	—	May 27, 2008	Kitt Peak	Spacewatch	PHO	600 m	MPC · JPL
664393	2008 LJ_{13}	—	January 27, 2007	Mount Lemmon	Mount Lemmon Survey	·	3.2 km	MPC · JPL
664394	2008 LW_{15}	—	April 8, 2008	Kitt Peak	Spacewatch	·	3.0 km	MPC · JPL
664395	2008 LN_{18}	—	January 19, 2012	Haleakala	Pan-STARRS 1	EUP	3.6 km	MPC · JPL
664396	2008 LO_{18}	—	September 25, 2009	Mount Lemmon	Mount Lemmon Survey	·	1.8 km	MPC · JPL
664397	2008 LR_{18}	—	March 31, 2012	Mount Lemmon	Mount Lemmon Survey	·	1.6 km	MPC · JPL
664398	2008 LS_{18}	—	June 1, 2008	Kitt Peak	Spacewatch	·	660 m	MPC · JPL
664399	2008 LA_{19}	—	November 4, 2016	Haleakala	Pan-STARRS 1	·	2.2 km	MPC · JPL
664400	2008 LD_{19}	—	November 28, 2016	Haleakala	Pan-STARRS 1	·	2.4 km	MPC · JPL

== 664401–664500 ==
back to top

Designation			Discovery			Properties		Ref
Permanent	Provisional	Named after	Date	Site	Discoverer(s)	Category	Diam.	Ref
664401	2008 LW_{19}	—	March 12, 2013	Mount Lemmon	Mount Lemmon Survey	·	2.4 km	MPC · JPL
664402	2008 LZ_{19}	—	July 16, 2013	Haleakala	Pan-STARRS 1	·	1.3 km	MPC · JPL
664403	2008 LS_{20}	—	July 28, 2015	Haleakala	Pan-STARRS 1	·	630 m	MPC · JPL
664404	2008 LU_{20}	—	February 3, 2012	Haleakala	Pan-STARRS 1	·	2.5 km	MPC · JPL
664405	2008 LV_{20}	—	March 8, 2013	Haleakala	Pan-STARRS 1	ELF	2.6 km	MPC · JPL
664406	2008 ML_{1}	—	June 29, 2008	Wrightwood	J. W. Young	VER	3.0 km	MPC · JPL
664407	2008 MW_{1}	—	June 29, 2008	Eskridge	G. Hug	MAS	720 m	MPC · JPL
664408	2008 MT_{4}	—	June 30, 2008	Kitt Peak	Spacewatch	·	610 m	MPC · JPL
664409	2008 MW_{5}	—	August 13, 2012	Haleakala	Pan-STARRS 1	·	780 m	MPC · JPL
664410	2008 NL_{1}	—	September 7, 2004	Palomar	NEAT	EUN	1.2 km	MPC · JPL
664411	2008 NM_{4}	—	July 30, 2008	Mount Lemmon	Mount Lemmon Survey	·	2.8 km	MPC · JPL
664412	2008 NJ_{5}	—	July 8, 2008	Mount Lemmon	Mount Lemmon Survey	JUN	1.1 km	MPC · JPL
664413	2008 OX	—	July 26, 2008	La Sagra	OAM	·	650 m	MPC · JPL
664414	2008 OF_{7}	—	July 29, 2008	Mount Lemmon	Mount Lemmon Survey	·	790 m	MPC · JPL
664415	2008 OO_{7}	—	July 29, 2008	Mount Lemmon	Mount Lemmon Survey	·	2.4 km	MPC · JPL
664416	2008 OL_{12}	—	July 27, 2008	La Sagra	OAM	·	690 m	MPC · JPL
664417	2008 OR_{12}	—	July 29, 2008	Mount Lemmon	Mount Lemmon Survey	·	1.3 km	MPC · JPL
664418	2008 ON_{14}	—	July 27, 2008	La Sagra	OAM	EUN	1.0 km	MPC · JPL
664419	2008 ON_{17}	—	July 29, 2008	Mount Lemmon	Mount Lemmon Survey	·	2.4 km	MPC · JPL
664420	2008 OV_{19}	—	July 29, 2008	Kitt Peak	Spacewatch	·	3.1 km	MPC · JPL
664421	2008 OG_{22}	—	July 30, 2008	Kitt Peak	Spacewatch	·	1.6 km	MPC · JPL
664422	2008 OL_{24}	—	July 30, 2008	Mount Lemmon	Mount Lemmon Survey	·	3.1 km	MPC · JPL
664423	2008 OP_{26}	—	July 28, 2008	Mount Lemmon	Mount Lemmon Survey	ADE	1.6 km	MPC · JPL
664424	2008 OY_{26}	—	July 30, 2008	Mount Lemmon	Mount Lemmon Survey	·	1.5 km	MPC · JPL
664425	2008 OX_{28}	—	February 26, 2014	Haleakala	Pan-STARRS 1	·	570 m	MPC · JPL
664426	2008 OT_{29}	—	May 31, 2013	Haleakala	Pan-STARRS 1	·	1.8 km	MPC · JPL
664427	2008 OZ_{29}	—	December 7, 2015	Haleakala	Pan-STARRS 1	·	2.5 km	MPC · JPL
664428	2008 OO_{30}	—	July 30, 2008	Mount Lemmon	Mount Lemmon Survey	·	1.1 km	MPC · JPL
664429	2008 OX_{30}	—	July 29, 2008	Kitt Peak	Spacewatch	·	1.2 km	MPC · JPL
664430	2008 OS_{32}	—	July 29, 2008	Mount Lemmon	Mount Lemmon Survey	·	1.3 km	MPC · JPL
664431	2008 PN	—	August 1, 2008	Dauban	Kugel, C. R. F.	EUN	1.1 km	MPC · JPL
664432	2008 PX	—	August 1, 2008	Tiki	Teamo, N.	·	820 m	MPC · JPL
664433	2008 PN_{1}	—	August 2, 2008	Dauban	Kugel, C. R. F.	JUN	1.0 km	MPC · JPL
664434	2008 PM_{4}	—	August 5, 2008	Hibiscus	Teamo, N., S. F. Hönig	·	630 m	MPC · JPL
664435	2008 PA_{6}	—	July 29, 2008	Mount Lemmon	Mount Lemmon Survey	·	1.4 km	MPC · JPL
664436	2008 PB_{7}	—	August 6, 2008	Vallemare Borbona	V. S. Casulli	·	1.4 km	MPC · JPL
664437	2008 PZ_{8}	—	August 6, 2008	Dauban	Kugel, C. R. F.	·	710 m	MPC · JPL
664438	2008 PC_{11}	—	August 6, 2008	Marly	P. Kocher	LIX	4.0 km	MPC · JPL
664439	2008 PK_{11}	—	July 30, 2008	Mount Lemmon	Mount Lemmon Survey	·	1.6 km	MPC · JPL
664440	2008 PO_{17}	—	July 29, 2008	Kitt Peak	Spacewatch	·	690 m	MPC · JPL
664441	2008 PX_{22}	—	January 24, 2015	Mount Lemmon	Mount Lemmon Survey	·	1.8 km	MPC · JPL
664442	2008 PB_{23}	—	October 22, 2017	Mount Lemmon	Mount Lemmon Survey	·	1.2 km	MPC · JPL
664443	2008 PF_{24}	—	August 6, 2008	Siding Spring	SSS	·	1.1 km	MPC · JPL
664444	2008 QT_{2}	—	August 23, 2008	Dauban	C. Rinner, F. Kugel	·	2.7 km	MPC · JPL
664445	2008 QC_{6}	—	August 25, 2008	Dauban	F. Kugel, C. Rinner	EOS	2.2 km	MPC · JPL
664446	2008 QX_{6}	—	August 25, 2008	Parc National des Cévennes	C. Demeautis, J.-M. Lopez	·	3.2 km	MPC · JPL
664447	2008 QZ_{9}	—	July 30, 2008	Kitt Peak	Spacewatch	·	660 m	MPC · JPL
664448	2008 QY_{13}	—	August 27, 2008	Piszkéstető	K. Sárneczky	·	1.4 km	MPC · JPL
664449	2008 QC_{14}	—	August 21, 2008	Kitt Peak	Spacewatch	·	640 m	MPC · JPL
664450	2008 QD_{15}	—	August 27, 2008	Vallemare Borbona	V. S. Casulli	·	1.3 km	MPC · JPL
664451	2008 QG_{15}	—	February 21, 2007	Kitt Peak	Spacewatch	·	1.4 km	MPC · JPL
664452	2008 QY_{15}	—	August 21, 2008	Kitt Peak	Spacewatch	·	3.0 km	MPC · JPL
664453	2008 QC_{17}	—	August 21, 2008	Kitt Peak	Spacewatch	·	1.1 km	MPC · JPL
664454	2008 QA_{18}	—	August 28, 2008	La Sagra	OAM	PHO	830 m	MPC · JPL
664455	2008 QT_{18}	—	August 29, 2008	Dauban	C. Rinner, F. Kugel	·	660 m	MPC · JPL
664456	2008 QD_{22}	—	August 26, 2008	Socorro	LINEAR	·	1.0 km	MPC · JPL
664457	2008 QO_{27}	—	August 30, 2008	La Sagra	OAM	·	2.2 km	MPC · JPL
664458	2008 QD_{28}	—	August 6, 2008	Siding Spring	SSS	·	1.1 km	MPC · JPL
664459	2008 QM_{29}	—	August 24, 2008	La Sagra	OAM	·	1.1 km	MPC · JPL
664460	2008 QW_{29}	—	July 29, 2008	Kitt Peak	Spacewatch	·	1.1 km	MPC · JPL
664461	2008 QG_{31}	—	August 30, 2008	Socorro	LINEAR	JUN	970 m	MPC · JPL
664462	2008 QQ_{39}	—	August 24, 2008	Kitt Peak	Spacewatch	V	400 m	MPC · JPL
664463	2008 QE_{43}	—	August 20, 2008	Kitt Peak	Spacewatch	·	1.3 km	MPC · JPL
664464	2008 QS_{44}	—	August 23, 2008	Kitt Peak	Spacewatch	·	870 m	MPC · JPL
664465	2008 QD_{47}	—	August 29, 2008	Črni Vrh	Matičič, S.	·	2.0 km	MPC · JPL
664466	2008 QC_{49}	—	November 27, 2013	Haleakala	Pan-STARRS 1	·	1.5 km	MPC · JPL
664467	2008 QC_{50}	—	January 28, 2010	WISE	WISE	·	2.5 km	MPC · JPL
664468	2008 RG	—	September 1, 2008	Hibiscus	Teamo, N., S. F. Hönig	·	1.5 km	MPC · JPL
664469	2008 RY_{8}	—	September 3, 2008	Kitt Peak	Spacewatch	NEM	1.8 km	MPC · JPL
664470	2008 RY_{10}	—	September 28, 2003	Kitt Peak	Spacewatch	·	2.3 km	MPC · JPL
664471	2008 RF_{12}	—	August 24, 2008	Kitt Peak	Spacewatch	MAR	930 m	MPC · JPL
664472	2008 RT_{20}	—	September 4, 2008	Kitt Peak	Spacewatch	·	1.5 km	MPC · JPL
664473	2008 RY_{21}	—	September 2, 2008	La Sagra	OAM	·	1.3 km	MPC · JPL
664474	2008 RS_{25}	—	September 5, 2008	Needville	J. Dellinger, C. Sexton	·	1.1 km	MPC · JPL
664475	2008 RQ_{26}	—	October 24, 2001	Palomar	NEAT	·	700 m	MPC · JPL
664476	2008 RF_{29}	—	September 2, 2008	Kitt Peak	Spacewatch	·	1.4 km	MPC · JPL
664477	2008 RK_{35}	—	September 2, 2008	Kitt Peak	Spacewatch	·	1.8 km	MPC · JPL
664478	2008 RX_{39}	—	September 2, 2008	Kitt Peak	Spacewatch	·	540 m	MPC · JPL
664479	2008 RP_{44}	—	August 23, 2008	Kitt Peak	Spacewatch	·	1.5 km	MPC · JPL
664480	2008 RQ_{46}	—	September 2, 2008	Kitt Peak	Spacewatch	EUN	750 m	MPC · JPL
664481	2008 RJ_{48}	—	September 6, 2008	Catalina	CSS	·	650 m	MPC · JPL
664482	2008 RW_{49}	—	September 3, 2008	Kitt Peak	Spacewatch	VER	2.8 km	MPC · JPL
664483	2008 RU_{53}	—	September 3, 2008	Kitt Peak	Spacewatch	·	1.4 km	MPC · JPL
664484	2008 RZ_{53}	—	April 13, 2004	Kitt Peak	Spacewatch	·	640 m	MPC · JPL
664485	2008 RX_{54}	—	September 3, 2008	Kitt Peak	Spacewatch	EOS	1.7 km	MPC · JPL
664486	2008 RT_{60}	—	September 4, 2008	Kitt Peak	Spacewatch	·	2.6 km	MPC · JPL
664487	2008 RG_{65}	—	September 4, 2008	Kitt Peak	Spacewatch	L4	7.5 km	MPC · JPL
664488	2008 RC_{66}	—	February 24, 2006	Mount Lemmon	Mount Lemmon Survey	·	3.8 km	MPC · JPL
664489	2008 RZ_{66}	—	September 4, 2008	Kitt Peak	Spacewatch	·	640 m	MPC · JPL
664490	2008 RM_{73}	—	September 6, 2008	Catalina	CSS	GEF	1.1 km	MPC · JPL
664491	2008 RQ_{80}	—	August 24, 2008	Kitt Peak	Spacewatch	(1547)	1.1 km	MPC · JPL
664492	2008 RY_{83}	—	September 4, 2008	Kitt Peak	Spacewatch	·	1.2 km	MPC · JPL
664493	2008 RJ_{84}	—	September 4, 2008	Kitt Peak	Spacewatch	·	570 m	MPC · JPL
664494	2008 RA_{90}	—	September 5, 2008	Kitt Peak	Spacewatch	EMA	2.8 km	MPC · JPL
664495	2008 RK_{91}	—	September 6, 2008	Kitt Peak	Spacewatch	·	1.5 km	MPC · JPL
664496	2008 RB_{108}	—	September 9, 2008	Mount Lemmon	Mount Lemmon Survey	·	1.7 km	MPC · JPL
664497	2008 RP_{110}	—	September 3, 2008	Kitt Peak	Spacewatch	HOF	2.3 km	MPC · JPL
664498	2008 RC_{111}	—	September 3, 2008	Kitt Peak	Spacewatch	·	1.3 km	MPC · JPL
664499	2008 RY_{115}	—	September 7, 2008	Mount Lemmon	Mount Lemmon Survey	EUN	750 m	MPC · JPL
664500	2008 RA_{126}	—	March 11, 2002	Palomar	NEAT	EUN	1.2 km	MPC · JPL

== 664501–664600 ==
back to top

Designation			Discovery			Properties		Ref
Permanent	Provisional	Named after	Date	Site	Discoverer(s)	Category	Diam.	Ref
664501	2008 RC_{134}	—	September 6, 2008	Catalina	CSS	·	740 m	MPC · JPL
664502	2008 RJ_{139}	—	September 7, 2008	Socorro	LINEAR	·	1.4 km	MPC · JPL
664503	2008 RM_{143}	—	September 4, 2008	Socorro	LINEAR	·	590 m	MPC · JPL
664504	2008 RB_{145}	—	September 5, 2008	Kitt Peak	Spacewatch	·	2.5 km	MPC · JPL
664505	2008 RU_{145}	—	September 9, 2008	Kitt Peak	Spacewatch	·	1.3 km	MPC · JPL
664506	2008 RN_{147}	—	September 6, 2008	Catalina	CSS	NYS	820 m	MPC · JPL
664507	2008 RS_{147}	—	May 25, 2006	Mauna Kea	P. A. Wiegert	3:2	4.5 km	MPC · JPL
664508	2008 RL_{148}	—	October 10, 2004	Kitt Peak	Spacewatch	·	1.4 km	MPC · JPL
664509	2008 RO_{149}	—	September 3, 2008	Kitt Peak	Spacewatch	GAL	1.2 km	MPC · JPL
664510	2008 RV_{149}	—	September 4, 2008	Kitt Peak	Spacewatch	·	1.3 km	MPC · JPL
664511	2008 RK_{150}	—	September 3, 2008	Kitt Peak	Spacewatch	·	1.4 km	MPC · JPL
664512	2008 RT_{150}	—	September 9, 2008	Kitt Peak	Spacewatch	·	1.5 km	MPC · JPL
664513	2008 RJ_{151}	—	September 9, 2008	Mount Lemmon	Mount Lemmon Survey	·	1.4 km	MPC · JPL
664514	2008 RL_{151}	—	September 7, 2008	Mount Lemmon	Mount Lemmon Survey	·	1.3 km	MPC · JPL
664515	2008 RU_{151}	—	September 6, 2008	Mount Lemmon	Mount Lemmon Survey	AEO	930 m	MPC · JPL
664516	2008 RB_{152}	—	September 7, 2008	Mount Lemmon	Mount Lemmon Survey	·	580 m	MPC · JPL
664517	2008 RN_{152}	—	September 6, 2008	Mount Lemmon	Mount Lemmon Survey	·	1.7 km	MPC · JPL
664518	2008 RH_{155}	—	September 7, 2008	Mount Lemmon	Mount Lemmon Survey	·	580 m	MPC · JPL
664519	2008 RK_{156}	—	September 7, 2008	Mount Lemmon	Mount Lemmon Survey	·	2.6 km	MPC · JPL
664520	2008 RF_{157}	—	September 9, 2008	Mount Lemmon	Mount Lemmon Survey	·	1.8 km	MPC · JPL
664521	2008 RW_{160}	—	September 5, 2008	Kitt Peak	Spacewatch	·	1.4 km	MPC · JPL
664522	2008 RN_{161}	—	August 25, 2014	Haleakala	Pan-STARRS 1	EOS	1.7 km	MPC · JPL
664523	2008 RG_{162}	—	September 7, 2008	Mount Lemmon	Mount Lemmon Survey	·	1.3 km	MPC · JPL
664524	2008 RB_{167}	—	September 7, 2008	Mount Lemmon	Mount Lemmon Survey	L4	7.2 km	MPC · JPL
664525	2008 RF_{169}	—	September 5, 2008	Kitt Peak	Spacewatch	·	1.1 km	MPC · JPL
664526	2008 RH_{169}	—	September 7, 2008	Mount Lemmon	Mount Lemmon Survey	·	2.5 km	MPC · JPL
664527	2008 RO_{169}	—	September 3, 2008	Kitt Peak	Spacewatch	·	580 m	MPC · JPL
664528	2008 RD_{170}	—	September 4, 2008	Kitt Peak	Spacewatch	·	1.2 km	MPC · JPL
664529	2008 RR_{170}	—	September 6, 2008	Catalina	CSS	·	1.3 km	MPC · JPL
664530	2008 RE_{171}	—	September 7, 2008	Mount Lemmon	Mount Lemmon Survey	·	1.1 km	MPC · JPL
664531	2008 RL_{179}	—	September 3, 2008	Kitt Peak	Spacewatch	·	1.8 km	MPC · JPL
664532	2008 SG	—	September 19, 2008	Kachina	Hobart, J.	·	1.7 km	MPC · JPL
664533	2008 SS_{1}	—	September 20, 2008	Goodricke-Pigott	R. A. Tucker	·	1.9 km	MPC · JPL
664534	2008 SD_{2}	—	September 22, 2008	Hibiscus	Teamo, N.	MRX	880 m	MPC · JPL
664535	2008 SS_{4}	—	September 7, 2008	Catalina	CSS	·	1.4 km	MPC · JPL
664536	2008 SD_{8}	—	September 23, 2008	Moletai	K. Černis	·	1.3 km	MPC · JPL
664537	2008 SJ_{9}	—	September 9, 2008	Mount Lemmon	Mount Lemmon Survey	·	590 m	MPC · JPL
664538	2008 SD_{11}	—	September 21, 2008	Kachina	Hobart, J.	·	770 m	MPC · JPL
664539	2008 SR_{18}	—	July 30, 2008	Mount Lemmon	Mount Lemmon Survey	·	690 m	MPC · JPL
664540	2008 SC_{19}	—	September 19, 2008	Kitt Peak	Spacewatch	TIR	2.3 km	MPC · JPL
664541	2008 SB_{20}	—	September 9, 2008	Mount Lemmon	Mount Lemmon Survey	ADE	1.8 km	MPC · JPL
664542	2008 ST_{20}	—	September 9, 2008	Mount Lemmon	Mount Lemmon Survey	·	1.2 km	MPC · JPL
664543	2008 SN_{26}	—	September 6, 2008	Mount Lemmon	Mount Lemmon Survey	·	850 m	MPC · JPL
664544	2008 SR_{27}	—	September 19, 2008	Kitt Peak	Spacewatch	L4	9.5 km	MPC · JPL
664545	2008 SH_{37}	—	September 20, 2008	Kitt Peak	Spacewatch	·	560 m	MPC · JPL
664546	2008 SA_{38}	—	September 6, 2008	Mount Lemmon	Mount Lemmon Survey	·	1.6 km	MPC · JPL
664547	2008 SQ_{40}	—	September 20, 2008	Kitt Peak	Spacewatch	PHO	660 m	MPC · JPL
664548	2008 SA_{44}	—	September 20, 2008	Kitt Peak	Spacewatch	·	800 m	MPC · JPL
664549	2008 SN_{44}	—	September 20, 2008	Kitt Peak	Spacewatch	·	1.5 km	MPC · JPL
664550	2008 SF_{45}	—	September 20, 2008	Kitt Peak	Spacewatch	·	560 m	MPC · JPL
664551	2008 ST_{47}	—	September 3, 2008	Kitt Peak	Spacewatch	·	2.1 km	MPC · JPL
664552	2008 SW_{49}	—	September 20, 2008	Mount Lemmon	Mount Lemmon Survey	·	1.5 km	MPC · JPL
664553	2008 SM_{50}	—	August 24, 2008	Kitt Peak	Spacewatch	·	1.6 km	MPC · JPL
664554	2008 SL_{51}	—	September 20, 2008	Kitt Peak	Spacewatch	ELF	2.9 km	MPC · JPL
664555	2008 SB_{54}	—	September 20, 2008	Mount Lemmon	Mount Lemmon Survey	·	1.3 km	MPC · JPL
664556	2008 SF_{54}	—	September 20, 2008	Mount Lemmon	Mount Lemmon Survey	·	1.5 km	MPC · JPL
664557	2008 SK_{54}	—	September 20, 2008	Mount Lemmon	Mount Lemmon Survey	·	1.4 km	MPC · JPL
664558	2008 SY_{55}	—	September 20, 2008	Kitt Peak	Spacewatch	·	3.1 km	MPC · JPL
664559	2008 SS_{57}	—	September 20, 2008	Kitt Peak	Spacewatch	JUN	700 m	MPC · JPL
664560	2008 SN_{58}	—	September 20, 2008	Kitt Peak	Spacewatch	·	1.6 km	MPC · JPL
664561	2008 SV_{61}	—	September 21, 2008	Kitt Peak	Spacewatch	·	2.2 km	MPC · JPL
664562	2008 ST_{62}	—	September 21, 2008	Kitt Peak	Spacewatch	·	1.2 km	MPC · JPL
664563	2008 SP_{64}	—	August 13, 2008	La Sagra	OAM	·	1.6 km	MPC · JPL
664564	2008 SS_{68}	—	August 4, 2008	Siding Spring	SSS	·	1.3 km	MPC · JPL
664565	2008 SV_{70}	—	September 22, 2008	Mount Lemmon	Mount Lemmon Survey	NEM	1.5 km	MPC · JPL
664566	2008 SW_{70}	—	September 22, 2008	Mount Lemmon	Mount Lemmon Survey	·	650 m	MPC · JPL
664567	2008 SE_{74}	—	September 23, 2008	Kitt Peak	Spacewatch	·	2.5 km	MPC · JPL
664568	2008 SZ_{75}	—	August 24, 2008	Kitt Peak	Spacewatch	·	540 m	MPC · JPL
664569	2008 SP_{76}	—	September 23, 2008	Mount Lemmon	Mount Lemmon Survey	·	1.7 km	MPC · JPL
664570	2008 SQ_{76}	—	September 23, 2008	Mount Lemmon	Mount Lemmon Survey	·	1.5 km	MPC · JPL
664571	2008 SZ_{78}	—	September 2, 2008	Kitt Peak	Spacewatch	·	1.7 km	MPC · JPL
664572	2008 SB_{79}	—	August 24, 2008	Kitt Peak	Spacewatch	·	970 m	MPC · JPL
664573	2008 SZ_{85}	—	September 20, 2008	Kitt Peak	Spacewatch	EUN	900 m	MPC · JPL
664574	2008 SB_{94}	—	September 21, 2008	Kitt Peak	Spacewatch	DOR	1.8 km	MPC · JPL
664575	2008 SW_{94}	—	September 21, 2008	Kitt Peak	Spacewatch	·	830 m	MPC · JPL
664576	2008 SF_{95}	—	September 21, 2008	Kitt Peak	Spacewatch	LEO	1.6 km	MPC · JPL
664577	2008 SJ_{95}	—	September 21, 2008	Mount Lemmon	Mount Lemmon Survey	H	370 m	MPC · JPL
664578	2008 SH_{97}	—	September 21, 2008	Kitt Peak	Spacewatch	·	1.1 km	MPC · JPL
664579	2008 SF_{99}	—	September 21, 2008	Kitt Peak	Spacewatch	·	640 m	MPC · JPL
664580	2008 SS_{104}	—	September 21, 2008	Kitt Peak	Spacewatch	·	2.9 km	MPC · JPL
664581	2008 SE_{107}	—	September 21, 2008	Siding Spring	SSS	·	2.4 km	MPC · JPL
664582	2008 SK_{107}	—	September 5, 2008	Kitt Peak	Spacewatch	·	2.9 km	MPC · JPL
664583	2008 SZ_{107}	—	September 22, 2008	Kitt Peak	Spacewatch	·	3.0 km	MPC · JPL
664584	2008 SS_{109}	—	January 30, 2006	Kitt Peak	Spacewatch	·	1.6 km	MPC · JPL
664585	2008 SF_{111}	—	September 22, 2008	Kitt Peak	Spacewatch	·	2.6 km	MPC · JPL
664586	2008 SY_{112}	—	September 22, 2008	Kitt Peak	Spacewatch	·	660 m	MPC · JPL
664587	2008 SB_{113}	—	September 22, 2008	Kitt Peak	Spacewatch	·	1.5 km	MPC · JPL
664588	2008 SD_{113}	—	September 4, 2008	Kitt Peak	Spacewatch	·	850 m	MPC · JPL
664589	2008 SZ_{118}	—	September 22, 2008	Mount Lemmon	Mount Lemmon Survey	NYS	650 m	MPC · JPL
664590	2008 SL_{123}	—	September 22, 2008	Mount Lemmon	Mount Lemmon Survey	·	3.4 km	MPC · JPL
664591	2008 SA_{124}	—	September 6, 2008	Mount Lemmon	Mount Lemmon Survey	·	680 m	MPC · JPL
664592	2008 SH_{126}	—	September 22, 2008	Mount Lemmon	Mount Lemmon Survey	MIS	2.5 km	MPC · JPL
664593	2008 SU_{126}	—	September 22, 2008	Kitt Peak	Spacewatch	H	380 m	MPC · JPL
664594	2008 SY_{130}	—	September 6, 2008	Mount Lemmon	Mount Lemmon Survey	·	1.6 km	MPC · JPL
664595	2008 SM_{135}	—	August 7, 2008	Kitt Peak	Spacewatch	·	2.4 km	MPC · JPL
664596	2008 SO_{135}	—	July 30, 2008	Mount Lemmon	Mount Lemmon Survey	·	1.3 km	MPC · JPL
664597	2008 SU_{137}	—	September 23, 2008	Mount Lemmon	Mount Lemmon Survey	·	900 m	MPC · JPL
664598	2008 SM_{144}	—	September 7, 2008	Mount Lemmon	Mount Lemmon Survey	JUN	600 m	MPC · JPL
664599	2008 SF_{147}	—	September 3, 2008	Kitt Peak	Spacewatch	·	3.5 km	MPC · JPL
664600	2008 SM_{149}	—	September 26, 2008	Kitt Peak	Spacewatch	·	1.1 km	MPC · JPL

== 664601–664700 ==
back to top

Designation			Discovery			Properties		Ref
Permanent	Provisional	Named after	Date	Site	Discoverer(s)	Category	Diam.	Ref
664601	2008 SL_{151}	—	September 5, 2008	Kitt Peak	Spacewatch	·	1.2 km	MPC · JPL
664602	2008 SB_{154}	—	September 20, 2008	Catalina	CSS	·	3.0 km	MPC · JPL
664603	2008 SG_{158}	—	August 23, 2008	Kitt Peak	Spacewatch	·	850 m	MPC · JPL
664604	2008 SR_{164}	—	September 6, 2008	Catalina	CSS	EUN	1.2 km	MPC · JPL
664605	2008 SH_{165}	—	August 24, 2008	Kitt Peak	Spacewatch	·	2.1 km	MPC · JPL
664606	2008 SN_{167}	—	August 31, 2008	Charleston	R. Holmes	EUN	1.5 km	MPC · JPL
664607	2008 SU_{169}	—	September 6, 2008	Kitt Peak	Spacewatch	·	1.2 km	MPC · JPL
664608	2008 SX_{169}	—	September 3, 2008	Kitt Peak	Spacewatch	·	1.2 km	MPC · JPL
664609	2008 SK_{178}	—	September 23, 2008	Kitt Peak	Spacewatch	·	600 m	MPC · JPL
664610	2008 SM_{181}	—	September 24, 2008	Kitt Peak	Spacewatch	·	520 m	MPC · JPL
664611	2008 SF_{186}	—	April 19, 2007	Mount Lemmon	Mount Lemmon Survey	·	2.6 km	MPC · JPL
664612	2008 SK_{186}	—	October 14, 2001	Kitt Peak	Spacewatch	·	1.1 km	MPC · JPL
664613	2008 SD_{194}	—	September 25, 2008	Kitt Peak	Spacewatch	·	1.6 km	MPC · JPL
664614	2008 SS_{194}	—	September 25, 2008	Kitt Peak	Spacewatch	·	2.2 km	MPC · JPL
664615	2008 SO_{196}	—	September 25, 2008	Kitt Peak	Spacewatch	H	440 m	MPC · JPL
664616	2008 SV_{199}	—	April 20, 2007	Kitt Peak	Spacewatch	·	640 m	MPC · JPL
664617	2008 SN_{203}	—	September 6, 2008	Mount Lemmon	Mount Lemmon Survey	·	1.1 km	MPC · JPL
664618	2008 SD_{206}	—	September 26, 2008	Kitt Peak	Spacewatch	·	730 m	MPC · JPL
664619	2008 SG_{210}	—	September 3, 2008	Kitt Peak	Spacewatch	·	960 m	MPC · JPL
664620	2008 ST_{214}	—	August 23, 2008	Kitt Peak	Spacewatch	THM	2.3 km	MPC · JPL
664621	2008 SF_{217}	—	September 22, 2008	Catalina	CSS	·	1.2 km	MPC · JPL
664622	2008 SV_{217}	—	September 30, 2008	Kitt Peak	Spacewatch	VER	2.7 km	MPC · JPL
664623	2008 SZ_{218}	—	August 24, 2008	Kitt Peak	Spacewatch	·	560 m	MPC · JPL
664624	2008 SS_{219}	—	September 10, 2008	Kitt Peak	Spacewatch	·	650 m	MPC · JPL
664625	2008 SD_{222}	—	September 25, 2008	Mount Lemmon	Mount Lemmon Survey	·	1.5 km	MPC · JPL
664626	2008 SU_{222}	—	September 25, 2008	Mount Lemmon	Mount Lemmon Survey	·	1.2 km	MPC · JPL
664627	2008 SV_{230}	—	November 30, 2003	Kitt Peak	Spacewatch	HYG	2.4 km	MPC · JPL
664628	2008 SF_{232}	—	September 28, 2008	Mount Lemmon	Mount Lemmon Survey	·	1.3 km	MPC · JPL
664629	2008 SW_{233}	—	September 28, 2008	Mount Lemmon	Mount Lemmon Survey	·	1.9 km	MPC · JPL
664630	2008 SF_{234}	—	September 3, 2008	Kitt Peak	Spacewatch	·	580 m	MPC · JPL
664631	2008 SD_{237}	—	August 24, 2008	Kitt Peak	Spacewatch	·	1.7 km	MPC · JPL
664632	2008 SP_{244}	—	September 21, 2008	Kitt Peak	Spacewatch	·	880 m	MPC · JPL
664633	2008 SK_{245}	—	September 29, 2008	Catalina	CSS	·	920 m	MPC · JPL
664634	2008 SN_{245}	—	September 29, 2008	Catalina	CSS	·	550 m	MPC · JPL
664635	2008 SB_{255}	—	September 23, 2008	Mount Lemmon	Mount Lemmon Survey	EUN	1.1 km	MPC · JPL
664636	2008 SZ_{255}	—	September 20, 2008	Kitt Peak	Spacewatch	·	620 m	MPC · JPL
664637	2008 SG_{256}	—	September 20, 2008	Kitt Peak	Spacewatch	·	740 m	MPC · JPL
664638	2008 SS_{259}	—	September 23, 2008	Mount Lemmon	Mount Lemmon Survey	·	2.6 km	MPC · JPL
664639	2008 SC_{263}	—	September 24, 2008	Kitt Peak	Spacewatch	EUN	960 m	MPC · JPL
664640	2008 SY_{263}	—	September 24, 2008	Mount Lemmon	Mount Lemmon Survey	·	1.8 km	MPC · JPL
664641	2008 SH_{266}	—	September 22, 2008	Mount Lemmon	Mount Lemmon Survey	·	1.3 km	MPC · JPL
664642	2008 SJ_{267}	—	September 23, 2008	Catalina	CSS	·	1.4 km	MPC · JPL
664643	2008 SE_{275}	—	September 22, 2008	Kitt Peak	Spacewatch	L4	6.9 km	MPC · JPL
664644	2008 SV_{277}	—	September 25, 2008	Mount Lemmon	Mount Lemmon Survey	L4	8.5 km	MPC · JPL
664645	2008 SA_{280}	—	September 24, 2008	Mount Lemmon	Mount Lemmon Survey	·	3.3 km	MPC · JPL
664646	2008 SM_{281}	—	September 21, 2008	Kitt Peak	Spacewatch	·	910 m	MPC · JPL
664647	2008 SJ_{282}	—	September 29, 2008	Mount Lemmon	Mount Lemmon Survey	·	1.1 km	MPC · JPL
664648	2008 SY_{286}	—	September 23, 2008	Catalina	CSS	·	2.2 km	MPC · JPL
664649	2008 SR_{292}	—	September 22, 2008	Catalina	CSS	H	560 m	MPC · JPL
664650	2008 SV_{297}	—	September 19, 2008	Kitt Peak	Spacewatch	VER	2.5 km	MPC · JPL
664651	2008 SY_{302}	—	September 24, 2008	Catalina	CSS	·	1.8 km	MPC · JPL
664652	2008 SZ_{308}	—	September 23, 2008	Mount Lemmon	Mount Lemmon Survey	H	590 m	MPC · JPL
664653	2008 SM_{310}	—	September 29, 2008	Mount Lemmon	Mount Lemmon Survey	·	1.7 km	MPC · JPL
664654	2008 SY_{311}	—	September 29, 2008	Kitt Peak	Spacewatch	EOS	1.6 km	MPC · JPL
664655	2008 SA_{315}	—	September 23, 2008	Kitt Peak	Spacewatch	AGN	980 m	MPC · JPL
664656	2008 SC_{315}	—	September 12, 2001	Kitt Peak	Spacewatch	SYL	3.4 km	MPC · JPL
664657	2008 SE_{315}	—	September 29, 2008	Mount Lemmon	Mount Lemmon Survey	·	1.6 km	MPC · JPL
664658	2008 SG_{315}	—	September 21, 2008	Kitt Peak	Spacewatch	·	1.6 km	MPC · JPL
664659	2008 SJ_{315}	—	March 14, 2011	Mount Lemmon	Mount Lemmon Survey	·	1.5 km	MPC · JPL
664660	2008 SQ_{315}	—	September 23, 2008	Kitt Peak	Spacewatch	·	2.0 km	MPC · JPL
664661	2008 SV_{315}	—	September 25, 2008	Mount Lemmon	Mount Lemmon Survey	·	1.6 km	MPC · JPL
664662	2008 SH_{316}	—	August 3, 2015	Haleakala	Pan-STARRS 1	·	770 m	MPC · JPL
664663	2008 ST_{316}	—	October 14, 2013	Mount Lemmon	Mount Lemmon Survey	·	1.2 km	MPC · JPL
664664	2008 SR_{317}	—	September 6, 2008	Kitt Peak	Spacewatch	·	650 m	MPC · JPL
664665	2008 SM_{320}	—	December 13, 2010	Mount Lemmon	Mount Lemmon Survey	(1118)	2.8 km	MPC · JPL
664666	2008 SF_{322}	—	September 29, 2008	Mount Lemmon	Mount Lemmon Survey	·	1.5 km	MPC · JPL
664667	2008 SM_{324}	—	September 23, 2008	Kitt Peak	Spacewatch	·	680 m	MPC · JPL
664668	2008 SQ_{324}	—	March 27, 2012	Kitt Peak	Spacewatch	·	2.8 km	MPC · JPL
664669	2008 SD_{326}	—	July 26, 2017	Haleakala	Pan-STARRS 1	·	1.6 km	MPC · JPL
664670	2008 SE_{327}	—	August 31, 2017	Haleakala	Pan-STARRS 1	·	1.6 km	MPC · JPL
664671	2008 SN_{327}	—	November 2, 2013	Mount Lemmon	Mount Lemmon Survey	AEO	910 m	MPC · JPL
664672	2008 SB_{328}	—	August 15, 2017	Haleakala	Pan-STARRS 1	·	2.0 km	MPC · JPL
664673	2008 SE_{332}	—	February 26, 2014	Haleakala	Pan-STARRS 1	·	520 m	MPC · JPL
664674	2008 SD_{333}	—	July 7, 2013	Bergisch Gladbach	W. Bickel	·	1.9 km	MPC · JPL
664675	2008 SG_{334}	—	September 29, 2008	Mount Lemmon	Mount Lemmon Survey	L4	8.4 km	MPC · JPL
664676	2008 SR_{336}	—	September 25, 2008	Kitt Peak	Spacewatch	·	760 m	MPC · JPL
664677	2008 SS_{338}	—	September 23, 2008	Kitt Peak	Spacewatch	·	1.4 km	MPC · JPL
664678	2008 SN_{340}	—	September 23, 2008	Kitt Peak	Spacewatch	·	1.6 km	MPC · JPL
664679	2008 SX_{340}	—	September 23, 2008	Kitt Peak	Spacewatch	·	1.5 km	MPC · JPL
664680	2008 SD_{342}	—	September 22, 2008	Mount Lemmon	Mount Lemmon Survey	·	1.2 km	MPC · JPL
664681	2008 SS_{342}	—	September 29, 2008	Mount Lemmon	Mount Lemmon Survey	·	610 m	MPC · JPL
664682	2008 SJ_{345}	—	September 25, 2008	Kitt Peak	Spacewatch	·	1.1 km	MPC · JPL
664683	2008 SG_{351}	—	September 21, 2008	Kitt Peak	Spacewatch	·	1.1 km	MPC · JPL
664684	2008 SM_{351}	—	September 23, 2008	Mount Lemmon	Mount Lemmon Survey	·	1.2 km	MPC · JPL
664685	2008 SA_{353}	—	September 27, 2008	Mount Lemmon	Mount Lemmon Survey	EUN	880 m	MPC · JPL
664686	2008 SY_{353}	—	September 29, 2008	Mount Lemmon	Mount Lemmon Survey	EUN	1.0 km	MPC · JPL
664687	2008 SC_{354}	—	September 23, 2008	Kitt Peak	Spacewatch	·	1.3 km	MPC · JPL
664688	2008 SB_{357}	—	September 25, 2008	Mount Lemmon	Mount Lemmon Survey	·	1.5 km	MPC · JPL
664689	2008 SH_{357}	—	September 29, 2008	Mount Lemmon	Mount Lemmon Survey	·	710 m	MPC · JPL
664690	2008 TO	—	October 1, 2008	Wrightwood	J. W. Young	·	1.3 km	MPC · JPL
664691	2008 TV_{4}	—	September 2, 2008	Kitt Peak	Spacewatch	·	1.3 km	MPC · JPL
664692	2008 TV_{5}	—	September 25, 2008	Kitt Peak	Spacewatch	·	1.7 km	MPC · JPL
664693	2008 TU_{6}	—	September 25, 2008	Mount Lemmon	Mount Lemmon Survey	·	610 m	MPC · JPL
664694	2008 TG_{9}	—	October 7, 2008	Great Shefford	Birtwhistle, P.	·	3.0 km	MPC · JPL
664695	2008 TC_{22}	—	October 1, 2008	Mount Lemmon	Mount Lemmon Survey	V	390 m	MPC · JPL
664696	2008 TU_{23}	—	September 2, 2008	Kitt Peak	Spacewatch	·	3.3 km	MPC · JPL
664697	2008 TE_{25}	—	October 2, 2008	Mount Lemmon	Mount Lemmon Survey	·	1.5 km	MPC · JPL
664698	2008 TL_{30}	—	September 20, 2008	Kitt Peak	Spacewatch	·	1.3 km	MPC · JPL
664699	2008 TB_{33}	—	September 20, 2008	Kitt Peak	Spacewatch	·	1.6 km	MPC · JPL
664700	2008 TW_{40}	—	August 21, 1999	Kitt Peak	Spacewatch	EUN	880 m	MPC · JPL

== 664701–664800 ==
back to top

Designation			Discovery			Properties		Ref
Permanent	Provisional	Named after	Date	Site	Discoverer(s)	Category	Diam.	Ref
664701	2008 TP_{41}	—	October 25, 2003	Kitt Peak	Spacewatch	EOS	1.8 km	MPC · JPL
664702	2008 TF_{42}	—	October 1, 2008	Mount Lemmon	Mount Lemmon Survey	·	1.6 km	MPC · JPL
664703	2008 TZ_{48}	—	August 24, 2008	Kitt Peak	Spacewatch	·	1.3 km	MPC · JPL
664704	2008 TO_{50}	—	September 24, 2008	Kitt Peak	Spacewatch	·	560 m	MPC · JPL
664705	2008 TX_{51}	—	September 23, 2008	Mount Lemmon	Mount Lemmon Survey	·	740 m	MPC · JPL
664706	2008 TA_{55}	—	September 24, 2008	Kitt Peak	Spacewatch	·	1.3 km	MPC · JPL
664707	2008 TA_{57}	—	September 24, 2008	Kitt Peak	Spacewatch	·	620 m	MPC · JPL
664708	2008 TL_{60}	—	March 10, 2005	Mount Lemmon	Mount Lemmon Survey	·	2.6 km	MPC · JPL
664709	2008 TB_{64}	—	September 22, 2008	Mount Lemmon	Mount Lemmon Survey	V	480 m	MPC · JPL
664710	2008 TE_{68}	—	October 2, 2008	Kitt Peak	Spacewatch	·	760 m	MPC · JPL
664711	2008 TY_{69}	—	September 23, 2008	Kitt Peak	Spacewatch	ADE	1.4 km	MPC · JPL
664712	2008 TB_{74}	—	October 2, 2008	Kitt Peak	Spacewatch	·	550 m	MPC · JPL
664713	2008 TV_{75}	—	October 2, 2008	Mount Lemmon	Mount Lemmon Survey	V	590 m	MPC · JPL
664714	2008 TZ_{76}	—	September 2, 2008	Kitt Peak	Spacewatch	THM	2.4 km	MPC · JPL
664715	2008 TB_{80}	—	October 2, 2008	Mount Lemmon	Mount Lemmon Survey	·	1.6 km	MPC · JPL
664716	2008 TX_{80}	—	September 24, 2008	Kitt Peak	Spacewatch	HOF	2.1 km	MPC · JPL
664717	2008 TB_{81}	—	September 24, 2008	Kitt Peak	Spacewatch	·	730 m	MPC · JPL
664718	2008 TY_{82}	—	August 7, 2008	Kitt Peak	Spacewatch	·	1.4 km	MPC · JPL
664719	2008 TG_{88}	—	September 29, 2008	Kitt Peak	Spacewatch	·	600 m	MPC · JPL
664720	2008 TD_{95}	—	April 13, 2001	Kitt Peak	Spacewatch	·	3.5 km	MPC · JPL
664721	2008 TC_{96}	—	October 6, 2008	Kitt Peak	Spacewatch	·	2.0 km	MPC · JPL
664722	2008 TK_{97}	—	September 5, 2008	Kitt Peak	Spacewatch	·	1.2 km	MPC · JPL
664723	2008 TG_{98}	—	September 5, 2008	Kitt Peak	Spacewatch	NEM	1.8 km	MPC · JPL
664724	2008 TH_{98}	—	September 4, 2008	Kitt Peak	Spacewatch	·	1.4 km	MPC · JPL
664725	2008 TT_{99}	—	October 6, 2008	Kitt Peak	Spacewatch	·	1.2 km	MPC · JPL
664726	2008 TC_{102}	—	March 14, 2007	Kitt Peak	Spacewatch	·	1.3 km	MPC · JPL
664727	2008 TY_{114}	—	May 1, 2003	Kitt Peak	Spacewatch	·	1.1 km	MPC · JPL
664728	2008 TP_{116}	—	October 1, 2008	Mount Lemmon	Mount Lemmon Survey	·	3.8 km	MPC · JPL
664729	2008 TL_{123}	—	September 23, 2008	Kitt Peak	Spacewatch	·	2.9 km	MPC · JPL
664730	2008 TF_{125}	—	September 23, 2008	Kitt Peak	Spacewatch	·	1.2 km	MPC · JPL
664731	2008 TJ_{128}	—	September 23, 2008	Kitt Peak	Spacewatch	HYG	2.8 km	MPC · JPL
664732	2008 TF_{133}	—	October 8, 2008	Mount Lemmon	Mount Lemmon Survey	·	750 m	MPC · JPL
664733	2008 TP_{134}	—	September 23, 2008	Kitt Peak	Spacewatch	·	1.3 km	MPC · JPL
664734	2008 TS_{134}	—	October 8, 2008	Kitt Peak	Spacewatch	·	1.4 km	MPC · JPL
664735	2008 TF_{137}	—	September 6, 2008	Mount Lemmon	Mount Lemmon Survey	·	1.2 km	MPC · JPL
664736	2008 TG_{137}	—	October 8, 2008	Kitt Peak	Spacewatch	·	650 m	MPC · JPL
664737	2008 TN_{138}	—	September 23, 2008	Kitt Peak	Spacewatch	·	3.8 km	MPC · JPL
664738	2008 TE_{139}	—	September 23, 2008	Kitt Peak	Spacewatch	·	1.0 km	MPC · JPL
664739	2008 TV_{142}	—	September 3, 2008	Kitt Peak	Spacewatch	AGN	990 m	MPC · JPL
664740	2008 TY_{142}	—	February 27, 2006	Kitt Peak	Spacewatch	·	1.6 km	MPC · JPL
664741	2008 TK_{146}	—	October 9, 2008	Mount Lemmon	Mount Lemmon Survey	·	460 m	MPC · JPL
664742	2008 TM_{149}	—	September 2, 2008	Kitt Peak	Spacewatch	·	1.2 km	MPC · JPL
664743	2008 TC_{153}	—	October 9, 2008	Mount Lemmon	Mount Lemmon Survey	·	790 m	MPC · JPL
664744	2008 TB_{154}	—	October 9, 2008	Mount Lemmon	Mount Lemmon Survey	DOR	1.9 km	MPC · JPL
664745	2008 TZ_{154}	—	October 9, 2008	Mount Lemmon	Mount Lemmon Survey	BRG	1.7 km	MPC · JPL
664746	2008 TX_{155}	—	October 9, 2008	Mount Lemmon	Mount Lemmon Survey	·	780 m	MPC · JPL
664747	2008 TK_{158}	—	November 11, 2004	Kitt Peak	Deep Ecliptic Survey	·	1.5 km	MPC · JPL
664748	2008 TR_{163}	—	October 1, 2008	Kitt Peak	Spacewatch	NYS	680 m	MPC · JPL
664749	2008 TH_{171}	—	October 10, 2008	Mount Lemmon	Mount Lemmon Survey	·	730 m	MPC · JPL
664750	2008 TD_{178}	—	September 21, 2008	Catalina	CSS	·	520 m	MPC · JPL
664751	2008 TV_{179}	—	October 1, 2008	Catalina	CSS	JUN	840 m	MPC · JPL
664752	2008 TM_{180}	—	October 2, 2008	Catalina	CSS	·	1.8 km	MPC · JPL
664753	2008 TE_{182}	—	October 1, 2008	Mount Lemmon	Mount Lemmon Survey	·	1.6 km	MPC · JPL
664754	2008 TW_{185}	—	October 7, 2008	Catalina	CSS	·	4.7 km	MPC · JPL
664755	2008 TO_{190}	—	August 25, 2008	Siding Spring	SSS	(194)	2.1 km	MPC · JPL
664756	2008 TM_{192}	—	October 10, 2004	Kitt Peak	Spacewatch	·	1.2 km	MPC · JPL
664757	2008 TZ_{193}	—	October 7, 2008	Mount Lemmon	Mount Lemmon Survey	·	1.1 km	MPC · JPL
664758	2008 TN_{194}	—	October 9, 2008	Catalina	CSS	·	1.7 km	MPC · JPL
664759	2008 TB_{196}	—	January 20, 2015	Haleakala	Pan-STARRS 1	·	1.3 km	MPC · JPL
664760	2008 TE_{196}	—	November 14, 2015	Mount Lemmon	Mount Lemmon Survey	·	770 m	MPC · JPL
664761	2008 TG_{196}	—	September 6, 2008	Kitt Peak	Spacewatch	·	1.4 km	MPC · JPL
664762	2008 TP_{196}	—	December 13, 2013	Mount Lemmon	Mount Lemmon Survey	·	1.1 km	MPC · JPL
664763	2008 TS_{197}	—	October 8, 2008	Mount Lemmon	Mount Lemmon Survey	V	570 m	MPC · JPL
664764	2008 TR_{198}	—	December 27, 2013	Mount Lemmon	Mount Lemmon Survey	·	1.6 km	MPC · JPL
664765	2008 TN_{199}	—	October 10, 2008	Mount Lemmon	Mount Lemmon Survey	·	860 m	MPC · JPL
664766	2008 TO_{199}	—	October 10, 2008	Mount Lemmon	Mount Lemmon Survey	·	1.6 km	MPC · JPL
664767	2008 TP_{199}	—	February 18, 2015	Haleakala	Pan-STARRS 1	WIT	730 m	MPC · JPL
664768	2008 TR_{199}	—	October 6, 2008	Kitt Peak	Spacewatch	·	610 m	MPC · JPL
664769	2008 TU_{199}	—	August 6, 2012	Haleakala	Pan-STARRS 1	ADE	1.6 km	MPC · JPL
664770	2008 TX_{200}	—	April 3, 2016	Haleakala	Pan-STARRS 1	·	1.1 km	MPC · JPL
664771	2008 TR_{201}	—	June 28, 2016	Haleakala	Pan-STARRS 1	·	1.3 km	MPC · JPL
664772	2008 TU_{206}	—	October 6, 2008	Mount Lemmon	Mount Lemmon Survey	·	830 m	MPC · JPL
664773	2008 TR_{208}	—	October 9, 2008	Mount Lemmon	Mount Lemmon Survey	·	1.4 km	MPC · JPL
664774	2008 TQ_{209}	—	October 9, 2008	Mount Lemmon	Mount Lemmon Survey	·	1.7 km	MPC · JPL
664775	2008 TN_{210}	—	October 6, 2008	Mount Lemmon	Mount Lemmon Survey	·	1.4 km	MPC · JPL
664776	2008 TJ_{211}	—	October 2, 2008	Mount Lemmon	Mount Lemmon Survey	·	2.3 km	MPC · JPL
664777	2008 TB_{217}	—	October 7, 2008	Mount Lemmon	Mount Lemmon Survey	·	770 m	MPC · JPL
664778	2008 TS_{217}	—	July 26, 2008	Siding Spring	SSS	·	1.2 km	MPC · JPL
664779	2008 TD_{219}	—	October 6, 2008	Mount Lemmon	Mount Lemmon Survey	·	1.4 km	MPC · JPL
664780	2008 TD_{220}	—	September 25, 1995	Kitt Peak	Spacewatch	·	1.2 km	MPC · JPL
664781	2008 TF_{220}	—	October 8, 2008	Mount Lemmon	Mount Lemmon Survey	·	1.3 km	MPC · JPL
664782	2008 TH_{220}	—	October 6, 2008	Mount Lemmon	Mount Lemmon Survey	·	1.1 km	MPC · JPL
664783	2008 TN_{222}	—	October 9, 2008	Mount Lemmon	Mount Lemmon Survey	L4	5.2 km	MPC · JPL
664784	2008 TY_{222}	—	October 10, 2008	Mount Lemmon	Mount Lemmon Survey	·	3.1 km	MPC · JPL
664785	2008 TH_{227}	—	October 10, 2008	Mount Lemmon	Mount Lemmon Survey	·	2.7 km	MPC · JPL
664786	2008 TO_{227}	—	October 1, 2008	Mount Lemmon	Mount Lemmon Survey	·	2.5 km	MPC · JPL
664787	2008 TQ_{227}	—	October 6, 2008	Kitt Peak	Spacewatch	·	540 m	MPC · JPL
664788	2008 TC_{229}	—	October 8, 2008	Kitt Peak	Spacewatch	·	1.3 km	MPC · JPL
664789	2008 TO_{230}	—	October 1, 2008	Mount Lemmon	Mount Lemmon Survey	·	1.2 km	MPC · JPL
664790	2008 UR_{5}	—	September 23, 2008	Kitt Peak	Spacewatch	·	720 m	MPC · JPL
664791	2008 US_{12}	—	October 17, 2008	Kitt Peak	Spacewatch	·	3.1 km	MPC · JPL
664792	2008 UW_{12}	—	October 17, 2008	Kitt Peak	Spacewatch	·	1.4 km	MPC · JPL
664793	2008 UM_{16}	—	September 24, 2008	Kitt Peak	Spacewatch	·	1.6 km	MPC · JPL
664794	2008 UT_{21}	—	May 26, 2007	Mount Lemmon	Mount Lemmon Survey	·	1.2 km	MPC · JPL
664795	2008 UC_{24}	—	April 24, 2001	Kitt Peak	Spacewatch	·	2.7 km	MPC · JPL
664796	2008 UK_{24}	—	October 20, 2008	Kitt Peak	Spacewatch	·	740 m	MPC · JPL
664797	2008 UD_{27}	—	September 6, 2008	Mount Lemmon	Mount Lemmon Survey	MRX	770 m	MPC · JPL
664798	2008 UO_{27}	—	October 20, 2008	Kitt Peak	Spacewatch	EUN	900 m	MPC · JPL
664799	2008 UZ_{31}	—	October 20, 2008	Kitt Peak	Spacewatch	·	1.7 km	MPC · JPL
664800	2008 UY_{32}	—	September 22, 2008	Mount Lemmon	Mount Lemmon Survey	·	840 m	MPC · JPL

== 664801–664900 ==
back to top

Designation			Discovery			Properties		Ref
Permanent	Provisional	Named after	Date	Site	Discoverer(s)	Category	Diam.	Ref
664801	2008 UU_{35}	—	September 24, 2008	Kitt Peak	Spacewatch	·	580 m	MPC · JPL
664802	2008 UJ_{38}	—	October 20, 2008	Kitt Peak	Spacewatch	V	540 m	MPC · JPL
664803	2008 UX_{38}	—	September 7, 2008	Mount Lemmon	Mount Lemmon Survey	·	940 m	MPC · JPL
664804	2008 UD_{47}	—	October 20, 2008	Kitt Peak	Spacewatch	·	1.6 km	MPC · JPL
664805	2008 UF_{48}	—	September 22, 2008	Kitt Peak	Spacewatch	ERI	1.1 km	MPC · JPL
664806	2008 UA_{57}	—	September 29, 2008	Kitt Peak	Spacewatch	·	1.8 km	MPC · JPL
664807	2008 UD_{57}	—	October 21, 2008	Kitt Peak	Spacewatch	·	1.3 km	MPC · JPL
664808	2008 UN_{57}	—	September 7, 2008	Mount Lemmon	Mount Lemmon Survey	V	430 m	MPC · JPL
664809	2008 UX_{59}	—	September 28, 2008	Mount Lemmon	Mount Lemmon Survey	V	460 m	MPC · JPL
664810	2008 UF_{65}	—	October 21, 2008	Kitt Peak	Spacewatch	·	600 m	MPC · JPL
664811	2008 UH_{67}	—	October 21, 2008	Kitt Peak	Spacewatch	·	1.3 km	MPC · JPL
664812	2008 UW_{67}	—	October 7, 2008	Mount Lemmon	Mount Lemmon Survey	·	1.6 km	MPC · JPL
664813	2008 US_{77}	—	October 21, 2008	Kitt Peak	Spacewatch	·	1.7 km	MPC · JPL
664814	2008 UV_{77}	—	October 21, 2008	Mount Lemmon	Mount Lemmon Survey	·	930 m	MPC · JPL
664815	2008 UE_{81}	—	October 8, 2008	Kitt Peak	Spacewatch	·	1.5 km	MPC · JPL
664816	2008 UJ_{81}	—	September 22, 2008	Kitt Peak	Spacewatch	NYS	810 m	MPC · JPL
664817	2008 US_{95}	—	October 29, 2008	Sandlot	G. Hug	·	1.2 km	MPC · JPL
664818	2008 UJ_{97}	—	October 25, 2008	Socorro	LINEAR	·	1.4 km	MPC · JPL
664819	2008 UX_{97}	—	October 22, 2008	Lulin	LUSS	·	1.9 km	MPC · JPL
664820	2008 UL_{99}	—	October 10, 2008	Mount Lemmon	Mount Lemmon Survey	·	560 m	MPC · JPL
664821	2008 UK_{103}	—	October 20, 2008	Kitt Peak	Spacewatch	·	1.9 km	MPC · JPL
664822	2008 UM_{107}	—	March 2, 1995	Kitt Peak	Spacewatch	·	1.8 km	MPC · JPL
664823	2008 UC_{110}	—	October 22, 2008	Kitt Peak	Spacewatch	GEF	1.0 km	MPC · JPL
664824	2008 UD_{115}	—	October 22, 2008	Kitt Peak	Spacewatch	V	510 m	MPC · JPL
664825	2008 UQ_{115}	—	October 22, 2008	Kitt Peak	Spacewatch	·	670 m	MPC · JPL
664826	2008 UX_{115}	—	October 22, 2008	Kitt Peak	Spacewatch	·	1.3 km	MPC · JPL
664827	2008 UG_{123}	—	October 22, 2008	Kitt Peak	Spacewatch	·	1.7 km	MPC · JPL
664828	2008 UR_{124}	—	October 22, 2008	Kitt Peak	Spacewatch	·	610 m	MPC · JPL
664829	2008 US_{138}	—	March 14, 2007	Kitt Peak	Spacewatch	·	880 m	MPC · JPL
664830	2008 UV_{138}	—	September 22, 2008	Kitt Peak	Spacewatch	·	1.4 km	MPC · JPL
664831	2008 US_{150}	—	October 23, 2008	Mount Lemmon	Mount Lemmon Survey	·	1.6 km	MPC · JPL
664832	2008 UH_{160}	—	October 23, 2008	Kitt Peak	Spacewatch	EUN	1.0 km	MPC · JPL
664833	2008 UM_{170}	—	October 9, 2008	Kitt Peak	Spacewatch	·	1.1 km	MPC · JPL
664834	2008 US_{170}	—	September 22, 2008	Kitt Peak	Spacewatch	·	1.6 km	MPC · JPL
664835	2008 UN_{172}	—	October 24, 2008	Kitt Peak	Spacewatch	·	1.6 km	MPC · JPL
664836	2008 UR_{172}	—	April 7, 2006	Kitt Peak	Spacewatch	·	2.7 km	MPC · JPL
664837	2008 UZ_{176}	—	October 24, 2008	Mount Lemmon	Mount Lemmon Survey	DOR	1.8 km	MPC · JPL
664838	2008 UY_{178}	—	October 24, 2008	Catalina	CSS	·	3.6 km	MPC · JPL
664839	2008 UP_{179}	—	October 24, 2008	Kitt Peak	Spacewatch	·	880 m	MPC · JPL
664840	2008 US_{180}	—	September 9, 2008	Mount Lemmon	Mount Lemmon Survey	·	1.2 km	MPC · JPL
664841	2008 UA_{181}	—	September 9, 2008	Mount Lemmon	Mount Lemmon Survey	·	1.7 km	MPC · JPL
664842	2008 UP_{183}	—	October 28, 1997	Kitt Peak	Spacewatch	MAS	750 m	MPC · JPL
664843	2008 UG_{190}	—	September 29, 2008	Catalina	CSS	BRU	1.9 km	MPC · JPL
664844	2008 UU_{192}	—	October 25, 2008	Mount Lemmon	Mount Lemmon Survey	·	870 m	MPC · JPL
664845	2008 UF_{195}	—	May 20, 2006	Kitt Peak	Spacewatch	·	3.3 km	MPC · JPL
664846	2008 UH_{200}	—	September 20, 2008	Kitt Peak	Spacewatch	·	660 m	MPC · JPL
664847	2008 UK_{200}	—	October 21, 2008	Kitt Peak	Spacewatch	PHO	730 m	MPC · JPL
664848	2008 UA_{205}	—	August 25, 2008	Siding Spring	SSS	·	1.8 km	MPC · JPL
664849	2008 UR_{208}	—	October 6, 2008	Kitt Peak	Spacewatch	AGN	1.1 km	MPC · JPL
664850	2008 UK_{212}	—	October 24, 2008	Kitt Peak	Spacewatch	VER	2.6 km	MPC · JPL
664851	2008 UZ_{214}	—	September 24, 2008	Kitt Peak	Spacewatch	·	950 m	MPC · JPL
664852	2008 UU_{216}	—	October 7, 2008	Kitt Peak	Spacewatch	·	770 m	MPC · JPL
664853	2008 UP_{217}	—	October 9, 2008	Kitt Peak	Spacewatch	·	1.5 km	MPC · JPL
664854	2008 UG_{218}	—	October 25, 2008	Kitt Peak	Spacewatch	NYS	760 m	MPC · JPL
664855	2008 UC_{222}	—	September 10, 2007	Mount Lemmon	Mount Lemmon Survey	HYG	2.9 km	MPC · JPL
664856	2008 UO_{222}	—	October 25, 2008	Kitt Peak	Spacewatch	·	630 m	MPC · JPL
664857	2008 UE_{225}	—	September 9, 2008	Mount Lemmon	Mount Lemmon Survey	·	1.8 km	MPC · JPL
664858	2008 UG_{227}	—	October 25, 2008	Kitt Peak	Spacewatch	·	1.7 km	MPC · JPL
664859	2008 UF_{228}	—	October 25, 2008	Kitt Peak	Spacewatch	·	2.7 km	MPC · JPL
664860	2008 UM_{231}	—	October 26, 2008	Kitt Peak	Spacewatch	·	630 m	MPC · JPL
664861	2008 UN_{233}	—	October 22, 2008	Kitt Peak	Spacewatch	·	3.5 km	MPC · JPL
664862	2008 US_{233}	—	September 23, 2008	Kitt Peak	Spacewatch	·	670 m	MPC · JPL
664863	2008 UW_{233}	—	October 26, 2008	Mount Lemmon	Mount Lemmon Survey	·	1.5 km	MPC · JPL
664864	2008 UX_{239}	—	October 26, 2008	Kitt Peak	Spacewatch	GEF	1.1 km	MPC · JPL
664865	2008 UK_{246}	—	April 29, 2006	Kitt Peak	Spacewatch	HYG	2.5 km	MPC · JPL
664866	2008 UM_{246}	—	October 26, 2008	Mount Lemmon	Mount Lemmon Survey	PHO	680 m	MPC · JPL
664867	2008 UW_{246}	—	October 26, 2008	Mount Lemmon	Mount Lemmon Survey	·	480 m	MPC · JPL
664868	2008 UA_{247}	—	October 20, 2008	Mount Lemmon	Mount Lemmon Survey	·	1.1 km	MPC · JPL
664869	2008 UG_{254}	—	April 24, 2000	Kitt Peak	Spacewatch	·	3.2 km	MPC · JPL
664870	2008 UC_{258}	—	September 22, 2008	Mount Lemmon	Mount Lemmon Survey	·	950 m	MPC · JPL
664871	2008 UD_{266}	—	October 28, 2008	Kitt Peak	Spacewatch	·	830 m	MPC · JPL
664872	2008 UO_{271}	—	October 28, 2008	Kitt Peak	Spacewatch	·	3.4 km	MPC · JPL
664873	2008 US_{271}	—	October 20, 2008	Kitt Peak	Spacewatch	·	580 m	MPC · JPL
664874	2008 UY_{271}	—	October 28, 2008	Kitt Peak	Spacewatch	·	1.4 km	MPC · JPL
664875	2008 UD_{275}	—	October 28, 2008	Kitt Peak	Spacewatch	·	1.6 km	MPC · JPL
664876	2008 UR_{281}	—	October 3, 2008	Mount Lemmon	Mount Lemmon Survey	·	880 m	MPC · JPL
664877	2008 UG_{285}	—	September 29, 2008	Mount Lemmon	Mount Lemmon Survey	·	1.3 km	MPC · JPL
664878	2008 UH_{285}	—	October 28, 2008	Kitt Peak	Spacewatch	AST	1.6 km	MPC · JPL
664879	2008 UH_{286}	—	September 26, 2003	Apache Point	SDSS Collaboration	·	1.3 km	MPC · JPL
664880	2008 UF_{290}	—	September 29, 2008	Mount Lemmon	Mount Lemmon Survey	·	1.3 km	MPC · JPL
664881	2008 UE_{291}	—	October 29, 2008	Kitt Peak	Spacewatch	H	460 m	MPC · JPL
664882	2008 UP_{291}	—	October 29, 2008	Kitt Peak	Spacewatch	·	840 m	MPC · JPL
664883	2008 UD_{293}	—	January 23, 2006	Kitt Peak	Spacewatch	·	760 m	MPC · JPL
664884	2008 UV_{298}	—	October 29, 2008	Kitt Peak	Spacewatch	VER	3.3 km	MPC · JPL
664885	2008 UJ_{306}	—	October 30, 2008	Kitt Peak	Spacewatch	·	1.4 km	MPC · JPL
664886	2008 UU_{306}	—	October 30, 2008	Kitt Peak	Spacewatch	·	1.8 km	MPC · JPL
664887	2008 UH_{308}	—	October 22, 2008	Kitt Peak	Spacewatch	·	840 m	MPC · JPL
664888	2008 UT_{310}	—	October 30, 2008	Catalina	CSS	HNS	1.4 km	MPC · JPL
664889	2008 UR_{318}	—	October 31, 2008	Mount Lemmon	Mount Lemmon Survey	·	1.4 km	MPC · JPL
664890	2008 UF_{323}	—	October 31, 2008	Kitt Peak	Spacewatch	AGN	870 m	MPC · JPL
664891	2008 UU_{324}	—	September 28, 2008	Mount Lemmon	Mount Lemmon Survey	·	1.3 km	MPC · JPL
664892	2008 UP_{327}	—	October 10, 2008	Mount Lemmon	Mount Lemmon Survey	·	1.5 km	MPC · JPL
664893	2008 UT_{327}	—	October 10, 2008	Mount Lemmon	Mount Lemmon Survey	·	2.8 km	MPC · JPL
664894	2008 UD_{333}	—	October 19, 2008	Kitt Peak	Spacewatch	·	1.6 km	MPC · JPL
664895	2008 UE_{339}	—	October 22, 2008	Kitt Peak	Spacewatch	V	500 m	MPC · JPL
664896	2008 UJ_{342}	—	October 28, 2008	Kitt Peak	Spacewatch	·	700 m	MPC · JPL
664897	2008 UK_{343}	—	October 24, 2008	Catalina	CSS	·	1.3 km	MPC · JPL
664898	2008 UR_{351}	—	October 24, 2008	Catalina	CSS	·	1.8 km	MPC · JPL
664899	2008 UX_{354}	—	October 29, 2008	Kitt Peak	Spacewatch	·	3.6 km	MPC · JPL
664900	2008 UK_{356}	—	October 23, 2008	Kitt Peak	Spacewatch	·	810 m	MPC · JPL

== 664901–665000 ==
back to top

Designation			Discovery			Properties		Ref
Permanent	Provisional	Named after	Date	Site	Discoverer(s)	Category	Diam.	Ref
664901	2008 UA_{357}	—	October 23, 2008	Kitt Peak	Spacewatch	·	750 m	MPC · JPL
664902	2008 UR_{363}	—	October 26, 2008	Catalina	CSS	·	1.2 km	MPC · JPL
664903	2008 UV_{366}	—	September 21, 2008	Kitt Peak	Spacewatch	·	1.9 km	MPC · JPL
664904	2008 UW_{367}	—	October 28, 2008	Socorro	LINEAR	·	640 m	MPC · JPL
664905	2008 UH_{372}	—	February 25, 2007	Mount Lemmon	Mount Lemmon Survey	·	650 m	MPC · JPL
664906	2008 UK_{373}	—	October 6, 2008	Mount Lemmon	Mount Lemmon Survey	·	500 m	MPC · JPL
664907	2008 UB_{376}	—	September 15, 2012	Catalina	CSS	·	1.2 km	MPC · JPL
664908	2008 UC_{376}	—	October 24, 2008	Kitt Peak	Spacewatch	·	1.3 km	MPC · JPL
664909	2008 UH_{376}	—	January 2, 2011	Mount Lemmon	Mount Lemmon Survey	·	3.1 km	MPC · JPL
664910	2008 UN_{376}	—	November 21, 2009	Mount Lemmon	Mount Lemmon Survey	·	1.9 km	MPC · JPL
664911	2008 UV_{376}	—	October 20, 2008	Kitt Peak	Spacewatch	·	650 m	MPC · JPL
664912	2008 UA_{377}	—	April 5, 2011	Kitt Peak	Spacewatch	·	1.8 km	MPC · JPL
664913	2008 UH_{377}	—	August 12, 2012	Mayhill-ISON	L. Elenin	·	1.4 km	MPC · JPL
664914	2008 UJ_{377}	—	October 30, 2008	Catalina	CSS	·	730 m	MPC · JPL
664915	2008 UL_{377}	—	August 31, 2017	Haleakala	Pan-STARRS 1	HOF	1.9 km	MPC · JPL
664916	2008 UB_{378}	—	October 25, 2008	Mount Lemmon	Mount Lemmon Survey	·	680 m	MPC · JPL
664917	2008 UJ_{378}	—	February 17, 2010	Mount Lemmon	Mount Lemmon Survey	MRX	890 m	MPC · JPL
664918	2008 UX_{378}	—	October 20, 2008	Kitt Peak	Spacewatch	·	720 m	MPC · JPL
664919	2008 UB_{379}	—	October 24, 2008	Mount Lemmon	Mount Lemmon Survey	·	1.4 km	MPC · JPL
664920	2008 UV_{379}	—	September 14, 2017	Haleakala	Pan-STARRS 1	·	1.5 km	MPC · JPL
664921	2008 UA_{380}	—	October 25, 2008	Mount Lemmon	Mount Lemmon Survey	·	1.6 km	MPC · JPL
664922	2008 UD_{380}	—	August 14, 2007	Siding Spring	SSS	·	3.5 km	MPC · JPL
664923	2008 UP_{380}	—	October 20, 2008	Mount Lemmon	Mount Lemmon Survey	·	1.4 km	MPC · JPL
664924	2008 UX_{381}	—	December 12, 1999	Kitt Peak	Spacewatch	·	2.0 km	MPC · JPL
664925	2008 UL_{382}	—	December 29, 2014	Haleakala	Pan-STARRS 1	·	1.7 km	MPC · JPL
664926	2008 UM_{382}	—	October 22, 2008	Kitt Peak	Spacewatch	·	1.6 km	MPC · JPL
664927	2008 UY_{382}	—	August 14, 2012	Haleakala	Pan-STARRS 1	·	1.8 km	MPC · JPL
664928	2008 UC_{384}	—	October 27, 2008	Kitt Peak	Spacewatch	AGN	1.0 km	MPC · JPL
664929	2008 UD_{384}	—	October 27, 2008	Kitt Peak	Spacewatch	·	440 m	MPC · JPL
664930	2008 US_{384}	—	April 28, 2011	Mount Lemmon	Mount Lemmon Survey	·	1.5 km	MPC · JPL
664931	2008 UY_{385}	—	October 28, 2008	Mount Lemmon	Mount Lemmon Survey	V	430 m	MPC · JPL
664932	2008 UM_{387}	—	February 26, 2011	Mount Lemmon	Mount Lemmon Survey	·	2.2 km	MPC · JPL
664933	2008 UP_{387}	—	December 26, 2017	Haleakala	Pan-STARRS 1	·	980 m	MPC · JPL
664934	2008 UE_{388}	—	April 29, 2014	Haleakala	Pan-STARRS 1	·	660 m	MPC · JPL
664935	2008 UF_{388}	—	May 6, 2014	Haleakala	Pan-STARRS 1	·	740 m	MPC · JPL
664936	2008 UJ_{388}	—	September 30, 2017	Haleakala	Pan-STARRS 1	·	1.5 km	MPC · JPL
664937	2008 UQ_{389}	—	June 25, 2011	Mount Lemmon	Mount Lemmon Survey	V	510 m	MPC · JPL
664938	2008 UA_{390}	—	August 24, 2017	Haleakala	Pan-STARRS 1	·	1.4 km	MPC · JPL
664939	2008 UL_{390}	—	October 31, 2008	Mount Lemmon	Mount Lemmon Survey	PHO	900 m	MPC · JPL
664940	2008 UE_{391}	—	September 19, 2008	Kitt Peak	Spacewatch	(13314)	1.5 km	MPC · JPL
664941	2008 UC_{392}	—	November 28, 2013	Haleakala	Pan-STARRS 1	·	1.4 km	MPC · JPL
664942	2008 UU_{392}	—	September 24, 2008	Catalina	CSS	·	810 m	MPC · JPL
664943	2008 UG_{393}	—	October 20, 2008	Kitt Peak	Spacewatch	·	1.6 km	MPC · JPL
664944	2008 UP_{393}	—	April 25, 2015	Haleakala	Pan-STARRS 1	·	1.1 km	MPC · JPL
664945	2008 UZ_{395}	—	October 20, 2008	Mount Lemmon	Mount Lemmon Survey	(12739)	1.3 km	MPC · JPL
664946	2008 UT_{397}	—	September 13, 2012	Mount Lemmon	Mount Lemmon Survey	WIT	820 m	MPC · JPL
664947	2008 US_{399}	—	September 28, 2008	Mount Lemmon	Mount Lemmon Survey	·	810 m	MPC · JPL
664948	2008 UX_{401}	—	October 26, 2013	Mount Lemmon	Mount Lemmon Survey	·	1.5 km	MPC · JPL
664949	2008 UM_{404}	—	October 28, 2008	Kitt Peak	Spacewatch	AGN	960 m	MPC · JPL
664950	2008 UA_{410}	—	October 21, 2008	Mount Lemmon	Mount Lemmon Survey	·	1.8 km	MPC · JPL
664951	2008 UA_{411}	—	October 21, 2008	Mount Lemmon	Mount Lemmon Survey	DOR	1.5 km	MPC · JPL
664952	2008 UZ_{411}	—	October 25, 2008	Catalina	CSS	·	530 m	MPC · JPL
664953	2008 UW_{413}	—	October 30, 2008	Kitt Peak	Spacewatch	AGN	970 m	MPC · JPL
664954	2008 UD_{414}	—	October 29, 2008	Kitt Peak	Spacewatch	GEF	870 m	MPC · JPL
664955	2008 UO_{414}	—	October 28, 2008	Kitt Peak	Spacewatch	·	1.5 km	MPC · JPL
664956	2008 VK_{5}	—	October 21, 2008	Mount Lemmon	Mount Lemmon Survey	·	3.3 km	MPC · JPL
664957	2008 VC_{6}	—	August 22, 2003	Palomar	NEAT	DOR	1.7 km	MPC · JPL
664958	2008 VT_{8}	—	November 2, 2008	Mount Lemmon	Mount Lemmon Survey	MRX	900 m	MPC · JPL
664959	2008 VG_{13}	—	November 7, 2008	Socorro	LINEAR	T_{j} (2.94)	2.9 km	MPC · JPL
664960	2008 VG_{20}	—	November 1, 2008	Mount Lemmon	Mount Lemmon Survey	·	530 m	MPC · JPL
664961	2008 VR_{30}	—	October 29, 2008	Kitt Peak	Spacewatch	·	1.4 km	MPC · JPL
664962	2008 VF_{32}	—	November 2, 2008	Mount Lemmon	Mount Lemmon Survey	·	620 m	MPC · JPL
664963	2008 VG_{33}	—	October 6, 2008	Mount Lemmon	Mount Lemmon Survey	·	2.0 km	MPC · JPL
664964	2008 VY_{36}	—	October 6, 2008	Mount Lemmon	Mount Lemmon Survey	·	940 m	MPC · JPL
664965	2008 VZ_{41}	—	October 7, 2008	Mount Lemmon	Mount Lemmon Survey	·	1.2 km	MPC · JPL
664966	2008 VZ_{46}	—	September 22, 2008	Mount Lemmon	Mount Lemmon Survey	·	680 m	MPC · JPL
664967	2008 VA_{49}	—	October 26, 2008	Kitt Peak	Spacewatch	·	890 m	MPC · JPL
664968	2008 VT_{51}	—	November 6, 2008	Kitt Peak	Spacewatch	·	850 m	MPC · JPL
664969	2008 VB_{61}	—	August 12, 2007	Kitt Peak	Spacewatch	·	2.9 km	MPC · JPL
664970	2008 VW_{61}	—	September 22, 2008	Mount Lemmon	Mount Lemmon Survey	·	810 m	MPC · JPL
664971	2008 VW_{62}	—	October 31, 2008	Kitt Peak	Spacewatch	V	580 m	MPC · JPL
664972	2008 VR_{63}	—	November 8, 2008	Mount Lemmon	Mount Lemmon Survey	·	3.1 km	MPC · JPL
664973	2008 VY_{66}	—	November 6, 2008	Mount Lemmon	Mount Lemmon Survey	V	660 m	MPC · JPL
664974	2008 VG_{74}	—	November 7, 2008	Mount Lemmon	Mount Lemmon Survey	·	1.7 km	MPC · JPL
664975	2008 VF_{82}	—	May 26, 2011	Mount Lemmon	Mount Lemmon Survey	·	1.5 km	MPC · JPL
664976	2008 VZ_{82}	—	November 1, 2008	Mount Lemmon	Mount Lemmon Survey	·	2.0 km	MPC · JPL
664977	2008 VC_{83}	—	November 3, 2008	Mount Lemmon	Mount Lemmon Survey	·	1.3 km	MPC · JPL
664978	2008 VH_{83}	—	November 2, 2008	Mount Lemmon	Mount Lemmon Survey	EMA	3.1 km	MPC · JPL
664979	2008 VL_{83}	—	November 6, 2008	Mount Lemmon	Mount Lemmon Survey	·	2.0 km	MPC · JPL
664980	2008 VA_{84}	—	November 1, 2008	Mount Lemmon	Mount Lemmon Survey	·	3.7 km	MPC · JPL
664981	2008 VE_{84}	—	August 7, 2011	Mayhill-ISON	L. Elenin	·	690 m	MPC · JPL
664982	2008 VZ_{84}	—	September 21, 2012	Mount Lemmon	Mount Lemmon Survey	MRX	1.0 km	MPC · JPL
664983	2008 VB_{85}	—	December 9, 2015	Haleakala	Pan-STARRS 1	SYL	3.5 km	MPC · JPL
664984	2008 VV_{86}	—	November 6, 2008	Kitt Peak	Spacewatch	(5)	980 m	MPC · JPL
664985	2008 VQ_{87}	—	October 10, 2012	Haleakala	Pan-STARRS 1	·	1.6 km	MPC · JPL
664986	2008 VM_{89}	—	November 2, 2008	Mount Lemmon	Mount Lemmon Survey	·	1.0 km	MPC · JPL
664987	2008 VT_{91}	—	September 2, 2017	Haleakala	Pan-STARRS 1	·	1.7 km	MPC · JPL
664988	2008 VS_{92}	—	November 6, 2008	Kitt Peak	Spacewatch	·	1.8 km	MPC · JPL
664989	2008 VU_{94}	—	November 8, 2008	Kitt Peak	Spacewatch	·	1.4 km	MPC · JPL
664990	2008 VD_{95}	—	October 28, 2017	Mount Lemmon	Mount Lemmon Survey	·	1.7 km	MPC · JPL
664991	2008 VZ_{95}	—	November 7, 2008	Mount Lemmon	Mount Lemmon Survey	·	1.7 km	MPC · JPL
664992	2008 VY_{97}	—	November 7, 2008	Kitt Peak	Spacewatch	·	700 m	MPC · JPL
664993	2008 VN_{98}	—	November 2, 2008	Mount Lemmon	Mount Lemmon Survey	AGN	980 m	MPC · JPL
664994	2008 VT_{98}	—	November 3, 2008	Kitt Peak	Spacewatch	·	690 m	MPC · JPL
664995	2008 VH_{99}	—	November 9, 2008	Kitt Peak	Spacewatch	·	1.4 km	MPC · JPL
664996	2008 VN_{105}	—	November 2, 2008	Mount Lemmon	Mount Lemmon Survey	·	1.7 km	MPC · JPL
664997	2008 VD_{109}	—	November 6, 2008	Kitt Peak	Spacewatch	·	1.3 km	MPC · JPL
664998	2008 WG	—	November 16, 2008	Dauban	Kugel, F.	·	570 m	MPC · JPL
664999	2008 WW_{3}	—	November 17, 2008	Kitt Peak	Spacewatch	·	1.3 km	MPC · JPL
665000	2008 WX_{3}	—	November 17, 2008	Kitt Peak	Spacewatch	·	1.4 km	MPC · JPL

back to top

== Meaning of names ==
As minor planet discoveries are confirmed, they are given a permanent number by the IAU's Minor Planet Center (MPC), and the discoverers can then submit names for them, following the IAU's naming conventions. The list below concerns those minor planets in the specified number-range that have received names, and explains the meanings of those names.

Official naming citations of newly named small Solar System bodies are approved and published in a bulletin by IAU's Working Group for Small Bodies Nomenclature (WGSBN). Before May 2021, citations were published in MPC's Minor Planet Circulars for many decades. Recent citations can also be found on the JPL Small-Body Database (SBDB). Until his death in 2016, German astronomer Lutz D. Schmadel compiled these citations into the Dictionary of Minor Planet Names (DMP) and regularly updated the collection.

Based on Paul Herget's The Names of the Minor Planets, Schmadel also researched the unclear origin of numerous asteroids, most of which had been named prior to World War II. This article incorporates text from this source, which is in the public domain: SBDB New namings may only be added to this list below after official publication as the preannouncement of names is condemned. The WGSBN publishes a comprehensive guideline for the naming rules of non-cometary small Solar System bodies.

Named minor planet	Provisional	This minor planet was named for...	Ref · Catalog
664136 Tercu	2008 EM_{144}	Ovidiu Tercu (b. 1971), the founder of the Astronomical Observatory of the Museum Complex of Natural Sciences and Călin Popovici Astroclub in Galați, Romania.	IAU · 664136
