= Meanings of minor-planet names: 339001–340000 =

As minor planet discoveries are confirmed, they are given a permanent number by the IAU's Minor Planet Center (MPC), and the discoverers can then submit names for them, following the IAU's naming conventions. The list below concerns those minor planets in the specified number-range that have received names, and explains the meanings of those names.

Official naming citations of newly named small Solar System bodies are approved and published in a bulletin by IAU's Working Group for Small Bodies Nomenclature (WGSBN). Before May 2021, citations were published in MPC's Minor Planet Circulars for many decades. Recent citations can also be found on the JPL Small-Body Database (SBDB). Until his death in 2016, German astronomer Lutz D. Schmadel compiled these citations into the Dictionary of Minor Planet Names (DMP) and regularly updated the collection.

Based on Paul Herget's The Names of the Minor Planets, Schmadel also researched the unclear origin of numerous asteroids, most of which had been named prior to World War II. This article incorporates text from this source, which is in the public domain: SBDB New namings may only be added to this list below after official publication as the preannouncement of names is condemned. The WGSBN publishes a comprehensive guideline for the naming rules of non-cometary small Solar System bodies.

== 339001–339100 ==
Named minor planet	Provisional	This minor planet was named for...	Ref · Catalog
There are no named minor planets in this number range

== 339101–339200 ==
back to top

Named minor planet	Provisional	This minor planet was named for...	Ref · Catalog
There are no named minor planets in this number range

== 339201–339300 ==
back to top

Named minor planet	Provisional	This minor planet was named for...	Ref · Catalog
339223 Stongemorin	2004 TN_{325}	Gilbert St-Onge (born 1955) and Lorraine Morin (born 1944), a Canadian amateur astronomical family with outreach and scientific contributions	JPL · 339223

== 339301–339400 ==
back to top

Named minor planet	Provisional	This minor planet was named for...	Ref · Catalog
There are no named minor planets in this number range

== 339401–339500 ==
back to top

Named minor planet	Provisional	This minor planet was named for...	Ref · Catalog
339486 Raimeux	2005 GV_{9}	Mont Raimeux, a mountain in the Jura range of Switzerland	JPL · 339486

== 339501–339600 ==
back to top

Named minor planet	Provisional	This minor planet was named for...	Ref · Catalog
There are no named minor planets in this number range

== 339601–339700 ==
back to top

Named minor planet	Provisional	This minor planet was named for...	Ref · Catalog
There are no named minor planets in this number range

== 339701–339800 ==
back to top

Named minor planet	Provisional	This minor planet was named for...	Ref · Catalog
There are no named minor planets in this number range

== 339801–339900 ==
back to top

Named minor planet	Provisional	This minor planet was named for...	Ref · Catalog
339855 Kedainiai	2005 TC_{49}	Kėdainiai is one of the oldest cities in Lithuania. It is located near the geographical center of the Lithuanian Republic about 50 km north of Kaunas on the banks of the Nevezis River. First mentioned in the 1372 Livonian Chronicle, its current population is about 24 000.	IAU · 339855

== 339901–340000 ==
back to top

Named minor planet	Provisional	This minor planet was named for...	Ref · Catalog
There are no named minor planets in this number range

back to top

Preceded by 338,001–339,000	Meanings of minor-planet names List of minor planets: 339,001–340,000	Succeeded by 340,001–341,000
