= List of minor planets: 339001–340000 =

The following is a partial list of minor planets, running from minor-planet number 339001 through 340000, inclusive. The primary data for this and other partial lists is based on JPL's "Small-Body Orbital Elements" and data available from the Minor Planet Center. Critical list information is also provided by the MPC, unless otherwise specified from Lowell Observatory. A detailed description of the table's columns and additional sources are given on the main page including a complete list of every page in this series, and a statistical break-up on the dynamical classification of minor planets.

Also see the summary list of all named bodies in numerical and alphabetical order, and the corresponding naming citations for the number range of this particular list. New namings may only be added to this list after official publication, as the preannouncement of names is condemned by the Working Group for Small Bodies Nomenclature of the International Astronomical Union.

Near-Earth obj.	MBA (inner)	MBA (outer)	Centaur
Mars-crosser	MBA (middle)	Jupiter trojan	Trans-Neptunian obj.
Unclassified

== 339001–339100 ==
Designation			Discovery			Properties		Ref
Permanent	Provisional	Named after	Date	Site	Discoverer(s)	Category	Diam.	Ref
339001	2004 GJ_{40}	—	April 12, 2004	Anderson Mesa	LONEOS	EUP	3.8 km	MPC · JPL
339002	2004 GK_{42}	—	April 14, 2004	Kitt Peak	Spacewatch	·	1.3 km	MPC · JPL
339003	2004 GQ_{45}	—	April 12, 2004	Kitt Peak	Spacewatch	EOS	2.2 km	MPC · JPL
339004	2004 GC_{47}	—	April 12, 2004	Kitt Peak	Spacewatch	·	710 m	MPC · JPL
339005	2004 GX_{48}	—	April 12, 2004	Kitt Peak	Spacewatch	·	3.7 km	MPC · JPL
339006	2004 GS_{50}	—	April 13, 2004	Kitt Peak	Spacewatch	·	3.1 km	MPC · JPL
339007	2004 GH_{52}	—	April 13, 2004	Kitt Peak	Spacewatch	·	2.3 km	MPC · JPL
339008	2004 GC_{57}	—	April 14, 2004	Kitt Peak	Spacewatch	·	2.9 km	MPC · JPL
339009	2004 GQ_{57}	—	April 14, 2004	Kitt Peak	Spacewatch	·	880 m	MPC · JPL
339010	2004 GE_{60}	—	April 14, 2004	Kitt Peak	Spacewatch	·	1.1 km	MPC · JPL
339011	2004 GF_{71}	—	April 13, 2004	Kitt Peak	Spacewatch	·	1.0 km	MPC · JPL
339012	2004 GT_{74}	—	April 15, 2004	Socorro	LINEAR	TIR	3.5 km	MPC · JPL
339013	2004 GT_{76}	—	April 15, 2004	Socorro	LINEAR	·	4.4 km	MPC · JPL
339014	2004 GC_{77}	—	April 15, 2004	Socorro	LINEAR	PHO	1.0 km	MPC · JPL
339015	2004 GF_{78}	—	April 9, 2004	Siding Spring	SSS	·	1.2 km	MPC · JPL
339016	2004 GC_{80}	—	April 12, 2004	Palomar	NEAT	·	1.3 km	MPC · JPL
339017	2004 GB_{81}	—	April 13, 2004	Kitt Peak	Spacewatch	·	3.3 km	MPC · JPL
339018	2004 GO_{83}	—	April 14, 2004	Kitt Peak	Spacewatch	·	2.9 km	MPC · JPL
339019	2004 HH	—	April 16, 2004	Anderson Mesa	LONEOS	·	570 m	MPC · JPL
339020	2004 HJ_{2}	—	April 16, 2004	Kitt Peak	Spacewatch	·	1.2 km	MPC · JPL
339021	2004 HC_{10}	—	April 17, 2004	Socorro	LINEAR	·	1.2 km	MPC · JPL
339022	2004 HW_{17}	—	April 17, 2004	Socorro	LINEAR	·	4.1 km	MPC · JPL
339023	2004 HA_{25}	—	April 19, 2004	Socorro	LINEAR	·	3.0 km	MPC · JPL
339024	2004 HO_{25}	—	April 19, 2004	Socorro	LINEAR	·	4.1 km	MPC · JPL
339025	2004 HF_{27}	—	April 20, 2004	Socorro	LINEAR	NYS	1.2 km	MPC · JPL
339026	2004 HF_{28}	—	April 20, 2004	Socorro	LINEAR	·	1.1 km	MPC · JPL
339027	2004 HU_{29}	—	April 21, 2004	Socorro	LINEAR	·	1.5 km	MPC · JPL
339028	2004 HB_{33}	—	March 23, 2004	Socorro	LINEAR	·	1.1 km	MPC · JPL
339029	2004 HQ_{34}	—	April 17, 2004	Anderson Mesa	LONEOS	·	3.6 km	MPC · JPL
339030	2004 HL_{36}	—	April 21, 2004	Socorro	LINEAR	·	1.0 km	MPC · JPL
339031	2004 HY_{37}	—	April 23, 2004	Kitt Peak	Spacewatch	EOS	2.7 km	MPC · JPL
339032	2004 HG_{39}	—	April 17, 2004	Kitt Peak	Spacewatch	·	3.9 km	MPC · JPL
339033	2004 HX_{46}	—	April 22, 2004	Socorro	LINEAR	·	1.0 km	MPC · JPL
339034	2004 HO_{53}	—	April 25, 2004	Haleakala	NEAT	·	3.4 km	MPC · JPL
339035	2004 HV_{62}	—	April 30, 2004	Kitt Peak	Spacewatch	HYG	2.7 km	MPC · JPL
339036	2004 HU_{66}	—	April 21, 2004	Kitt Peak	Spacewatch	·	2.7 km	MPC · JPL
339037	2004 JH_{1}	—	May 11, 2004	Desert Eagle	W. K. Y. Yeung	·	1.3 km	MPC · JPL
339038	2004 JA_{13}	—	May 12, 2004	Socorro	LINEAR	H	590 m	MPC · JPL
339039	2004 JM_{14}	—	May 9, 2004	Kitt Peak	Spacewatch	·	1.8 km	MPC · JPL
339040	2004 JH_{25}	—	May 15, 2004	Socorro	LINEAR	NYS	1.0 km	MPC · JPL
339041	2004 JD_{28}	—	May 13, 2004	Palomar	NEAT	·	1.2 km	MPC · JPL
339042	2004 JN_{31}	—	May 15, 2004	Campo Imperatore	CINEOS	·	1.0 km	MPC · JPL
339043	2004 JH_{34}	—	May 15, 2004	Socorro	LINEAR	·	1.5 km	MPC · JPL
339044	2004 JZ_{40}	—	May 14, 2004	Kitt Peak	Spacewatch	·	4.4 km	MPC · JPL
339045	2004 KK_{4}	—	May 16, 2004	Siding Spring	SSS	V	760 m	MPC · JPL
339046	2004 KK_{11}	—	May 19, 2004	Campo Imperatore	CINEOS	ERI	1.6 km	MPC · JPL
339047	2004 LD_{11}	—	June 10, 2004	Campo Imperatore	CINEOS	·	940 m	MPC · JPL
339048	2004 LY_{23}	—	June 13, 2004	Socorro	LINEAR	PHO	1.9 km	MPC · JPL
339049	2004 LV_{29}	—	June 14, 2004	Kitt Peak	Spacewatch	·	1.4 km	MPC · JPL
339050	2004 MC_{3}	—	June 20, 2004	Reedy Creek	J. Broughton	·	1.7 km	MPC · JPL
339051	2004 MC_{6}	—	June 21, 2004	Socorro	LINEAR	H	650 m	MPC · JPL
339052	2004 NH	—	July 8, 2004	Reedy Creek	J. Broughton	·	1.5 km	MPC · JPL
339053	2004 NM_{2}	—	July 9, 2004	Siding Spring	SSS	·	1.7 km	MPC · JPL
339054	2004 NU_{9}	—	July 9, 2004	Socorro	LINEAR	·	1.6 km	MPC · JPL
339055	2004 NK_{17}	—	July 11, 2004	Socorro	LINEAR	·	1.7 km	MPC · JPL
339056	2004 OW	—	July 16, 2004	Reedy Creek	J. Broughton	·	1.4 km	MPC · JPL
339057	2004 OJ_{8}	—	July 16, 2004	Socorro	LINEAR	·	1.3 km	MPC · JPL
339058	2004 PX_{7}	—	August 6, 2004	Palomar	NEAT	·	1.3 km	MPC · JPL
339059	2004 PD_{22}	—	August 8, 2004	Socorro	LINEAR	·	1.3 km	MPC · JPL
339060	2004 PL_{23}	—	August 8, 2004	Socorro	LINEAR	·	1.2 km	MPC · JPL
339061	2004 PZ_{29}	—	August 7, 2004	Palomar	NEAT	H	720 m	MPC · JPL
339062	2004 PM_{42}	—	August 9, 2004	Anderson Mesa	LONEOS	H	530 m	MPC · JPL
339063	2004 PA_{51}	—	August 8, 2004	Socorro	LINEAR	NYS	1.2 km	MPC · JPL
339064	2004 PW_{53}	—	August 8, 2004	Socorro	LINEAR	·	2.0 km	MPC · JPL
339065	2004 PC_{55}	—	August 8, 2004	Palomar	NEAT	H	660 m	MPC · JPL
339066	2004 PR_{68}	—	August 7, 2004	Campo Imperatore	CINEOS	PHO	1.1 km	MPC · JPL
339067	2004 PP_{91}	—	August 12, 2004	Socorro	LINEAR	·	1.7 km	MPC · JPL
339068	2004 PY_{95}	—	August 10, 2004	Socorro	LINEAR	·	1.4 km	MPC · JPL
339069	2004 PQ_{102}	—	August 12, 2004	Socorro	LINEAR	V	990 m	MPC · JPL
339070	2004 PN_{107}	—	August 10, 2004	Palomar	NEAT	H · slow	830 m	MPC · JPL
339071	2004 PH_{111}	—	August 15, 2004	Cerro Tololo	M. W. Buie	MAS	870 m	MPC · JPL
339072	2004 QK_{13}	—	August 20, 2004	Socorro	LINEAR	·	2.4 km	MPC · JPL
339073	2004 QP_{18}	—	August 20, 2004	Siding Spring	SSS	·	2.3 km	MPC · JPL
339074	2004 QQ_{21}	—	August 23, 2004	Kitt Peak	Spacewatch	·	1.9 km	MPC · JPL
339075	2004 RE_{2}	—	September 6, 2004	Socorro	LINEAR	H	720 m	MPC · JPL
339076	2004 RU_{17}	—	September 7, 2004	Kitt Peak	Spacewatch	·	1.4 km	MPC · JPL
339077	2004 RJ_{18}	—	September 7, 2004	Socorro	LINEAR	·	1.5 km	MPC · JPL
339078	2004 RR_{21}	—	September 7, 2004	Kitt Peak	Spacewatch	NYS	1.3 km	MPC · JPL
339079	2004 RH_{23}	—	September 7, 2004	Kitt Peak	Spacewatch	·	1.4 km	MPC · JPL
339080	2004 RM_{24}	—	September 8, 2004	Socorro	LINEAR	H	770 m	MPC · JPL
339081	2004 RF_{28}	—	September 6, 2004	Siding Spring	SSS	·	1.1 km	MPC · JPL
339082	2004 RC_{41}	—	September 7, 2004	Kitt Peak	Spacewatch	·	1.5 km	MPC · JPL
339083	2004 RK_{71}	—	September 8, 2004	Socorro	LINEAR	·	1.7 km	MPC · JPL
339084	2004 RQ_{74}	—	September 8, 2004	Socorro	LINEAR	H	760 m	MPC · JPL
339085	2004 RG_{78}	—	September 8, 2004	Socorro	LINEAR	·	1.7 km	MPC · JPL
339086	2004 RM_{86}	—	September 7, 2004	Socorro	LINEAR	PHO	1.1 km	MPC · JPL
339087	2004 RV_{100}	—	September 8, 2004	Socorro	LINEAR	·	850 m	MPC · JPL
339088	2004 RK_{109}	—	September 10, 2004	Needville	W. G. Dillon, M. Eastman	H	640 m	MPC · JPL
339089	2004 RO_{110}	—	September 11, 2004	Socorro	LINEAR	H	720 m	MPC · JPL
339090	2004 RA_{114}	—	September 7, 2004	Palomar	NEAT	H	930 m	MPC · JPL
339091	2004 RX_{118}	—	September 7, 2004	Palomar	NEAT	·	880 m	MPC · JPL
339092	2004 RK_{129}	—	September 7, 2004	Kitt Peak	Spacewatch	·	1.7 km	MPC · JPL
339093	2004 RN_{151}	—	September 9, 2004	Socorro	LINEAR	·	1.8 km	MPC · JPL
339094	2004 RU_{158}	—	September 10, 2004	Socorro	LINEAR	·	1.0 km	MPC · JPL
339095	2004 RA_{159}	—	September 10, 2004	Socorro	LINEAR	·	1.3 km	MPC · JPL
339096	2004 RD_{161}	—	September 10, 2004	Socorro	LINEAR	H	680 m	MPC · JPL
339097	2004 RD_{162}	—	September 11, 2004	Socorro	LINEAR	·	1.2 km	MPC · JPL
339098	2004 RH_{166}	—	September 7, 2004	Socorro	LINEAR	MAS	780 m	MPC · JPL
339099	2004 RU_{167}	—	September 7, 2004	Palomar	NEAT	·	1.3 km	MPC · JPL
339100	2004 RZ_{169}	—	September 8, 2004	Socorro	LINEAR	·	1.1 km	MPC · JPL

== 339101–339200 ==
back to top

Designation			Discovery			Properties		Ref
Permanent	Provisional	Named after	Date	Site	Discoverer(s)	Category	Diam.	Ref
339101	2004 RN_{173}	—	September 9, 2004	Socorro	LINEAR	·	2.2 km	MPC · JPL
339102	2004 RH_{175}	—	September 10, 2004	Socorro	LINEAR	·	1.5 km	MPC · JPL
339103	2004 RB_{180}	—	September 10, 2004	Socorro	LINEAR	·	1.6 km	MPC · JPL
339104	2004 RF_{197}	—	September 10, 2004	Socorro	LINEAR	·	1.6 km	MPC · JPL
339105	2004 RA_{204}	—	September 12, 2004	Kitt Peak	Spacewatch	·	990 m	MPC · JPL
339106	2004 RY_{206}	—	September 11, 2004	Socorro	LINEAR	·	6.2 km	MPC · JPL
339107	2004 RC_{207}	—	September 11, 2004	Socorro	LINEAR	PHO	1.1 km	MPC · JPL
339108	2004 RK_{212}	—	September 11, 2004	Socorro	LINEAR	·	1.3 km	MPC · JPL
339109	2004 RT_{216}	—	September 11, 2004	Socorro	LINEAR	EUN · slow	1.8 km	MPC · JPL
339110	2004 RV_{218}	—	September 11, 2004	Socorro	LINEAR	·	1.6 km	MPC · JPL
339111	2004 RC_{221}	—	September 11, 2004	Socorro	LINEAR	·	2.2 km	MPC · JPL
339112	2004 RQ_{221}	—	September 12, 2004	Socorro	LINEAR	PHO	1.3 km	MPC · JPL
339113	2004 RZ_{223}	—	September 8, 2004	Socorro	LINEAR	NYS	1.2 km	MPC · JPL
339114	2004 RK_{230}	—	September 9, 2004	Kitt Peak	Spacewatch	·	1.7 km	MPC · JPL
339115	2004 RW_{232}	—	September 9, 2004	Kitt Peak	Spacewatch	·	710 m	MPC · JPL
339116	2004 RN_{233}	—	September 9, 2004	Kitt Peak	Spacewatch	·	980 m	MPC · JPL
339117	2004 RZ_{246}	—	September 11, 2004	Socorro	LINEAR	·	4.4 km	MPC · JPL
339118	2004 RR_{247}	—	September 12, 2004	Socorro	LINEAR	H	610 m	MPC · JPL
339119	2004 RC_{249}	—	September 12, 2004	Socorro	LINEAR	H	790 m	MPC · JPL
339120	2004 RE_{249}	—	September 12, 2004	Socorro	LINEAR	H	800 m	MPC · JPL
339121	2004 RB_{252}	—	September 15, 2004	Mauna Kea	Pittichová, J., Bedient, J.	·	1.2 km	MPC · JPL
339122	2004 RD_{255}	—	September 6, 2004	Palomar	NEAT	H	730 m	MPC · JPL
339123	2004 RC_{266}	—	September 10, 2004	Kitt Peak	Spacewatch	·	1.3 km	MPC · JPL
339124	2004 RB_{292}	—	September 10, 2004	Socorro	LINEAR	H	640 m	MPC · JPL
339125	2004 RB_{304}	—	September 12, 2004	Kitt Peak	Spacewatch	·	1.3 km	MPC · JPL
339126	2004 RD_{319}	—	September 13, 2004	Kitt Peak	Spacewatch	·	2.2 km	MPC · JPL
339127	2004 RF_{321}	—	September 13, 2004	Palomar	NEAT	EUN	1.2 km	MPC · JPL
339128	2004 RM_{325}	—	September 13, 2004	Socorro	LINEAR	·	2.1 km	MPC · JPL
339129	2004 RG_{329}	—	September 15, 2004	Anderson Mesa	LONEOS	·	1.2 km	MPC · JPL
339130	2004 RA_{336}	—	September 15, 2004	Kitt Peak	Spacewatch	·	630 m	MPC · JPL
339131	2004 RP_{337}	—	September 15, 2004	Kitt Peak	Spacewatch	·	860 m	MPC · JPL
339132	2004 RC_{356}	—	September 7, 2004	Kitt Peak	Spacewatch	·	840 m	MPC · JPL
339133	2004 SO_{2}	—	September 16, 2004	Siding Spring	SSS	PHO	1.3 km	MPC · JPL
339134	2004 SW_{11}	—	September 16, 2004	Siding Spring	SSS	PHO	1.4 km	MPC · JPL
339135	2004 SP_{16}	—	September 17, 2004	Anderson Mesa	LONEOS	PHO	1.5 km	MPC · JPL
339136	2004 SG_{45}	—	September 18, 2004	Socorro	LINEAR	T_{j} (2.96)	5.6 km	MPC · JPL
339137	2004 SC_{48}	—	September 18, 2004	Socorro	LINEAR	·	2.4 km	MPC · JPL
339138	2004 SU_{58}	—	September 21, 2004	Socorro	LINEAR	·	1.1 km	MPC · JPL
339139	2004 SW_{58}	—	September 21, 2004	Socorro	LINEAR	H	660 m	MPC · JPL
339140	2004 SN_{59}	—	September 23, 2004	Socorro	LINEAR	H	650 m	MPC · JPL
339141	2004 TJ	—	October 3, 2004	Goodricke-Pigott	R. A. Tucker	·	1.3 km	MPC · JPL
339142	2004 TW_{3}	—	October 4, 2004	Kitt Peak	Spacewatch	·	1.1 km	MPC · JPL
339143	2004 TD_{5}	—	October 4, 2004	Kitt Peak	Spacewatch	·	1.5 km	MPC · JPL
339144	2004 TX_{5}	—	October 5, 2004	Kitt Peak	Spacewatch	·	1.3 km	MPC · JPL
339145	2004 TA_{6}	—	October 5, 2004	Kitt Peak	Spacewatch	·	1.3 km	MPC · JPL
339146	2004 TG_{7}	—	October 5, 2004	Socorro	LINEAR	·	1.8 km	MPC · JPL
339147	2004 TY_{8}	—	October 6, 2004	Kitt Peak	Spacewatch	·	400 m	MPC · JPL
339148	2004 TT_{9}	—	October 7, 2004	Socorro	LINEAR	·	2.1 km	MPC · JPL
339149	2004 TU_{10}	—	October 8, 2004	Kitt Peak	Spacewatch	H	510 m	MPC · JPL
339150	2004 TQ_{11}	—	September 12, 2004	Socorro	LINEAR	H	750 m	MPC · JPL
339151	2004 TJ_{13}	—	October 8, 2004	Socorro	LINEAR	H	760 m	MPC · JPL
339152	2004 TQ_{23}	—	October 4, 2004	Kitt Peak	Spacewatch	(5)	990 m	MPC · JPL
339153	2004 TT_{28}	—	October 4, 2004	Kitt Peak	Spacewatch	T_{j} (2.98) · HIL · 3:2	7.2 km	MPC · JPL
339154	2004 TB_{37}	—	October 4, 2004	Kitt Peak	Spacewatch	·	1.4 km	MPC · JPL
339155	2004 TT_{44}	—	October 4, 2004	Kitt Peak	Spacewatch	·	1.1 km	MPC · JPL
339156	2004 TD_{46}	—	October 4, 2004	Kitt Peak	Spacewatch	·	1.9 km	MPC · JPL
339157	2004 TG_{52}	—	October 4, 2004	Kitt Peak	Spacewatch	(5)	1.2 km	MPC · JPL
339158	2004 TO_{53}	—	October 4, 2004	Kitt Peak	Spacewatch	·	1.4 km	MPC · JPL
339159	2004 TT_{54}	—	October 4, 2004	Kitt Peak	Spacewatch	EUN	1.1 km	MPC · JPL
339160	2004 TS_{56}	—	October 5, 2004	Kitt Peak	Spacewatch	·	930 m	MPC · JPL
339161	2004 TS_{61}	—	October 5, 2004	Anderson Mesa	LONEOS	·	1.3 km	MPC · JPL
339162	2004 TJ_{63}	—	October 5, 2004	Kitt Peak	Spacewatch	·	1.3 km	MPC · JPL
339163	2004 TK_{66}	—	October 5, 2004	Anderson Mesa	LONEOS	·	1.0 km	MPC · JPL
339164	2004 TO_{66}	—	October 5, 2004	Anderson Mesa	LONEOS	H	760 m	MPC · JPL
339165	2004 TO_{67}	—	October 5, 2004	Anderson Mesa	LONEOS	·	1.2 km	MPC · JPL
339166	2004 TO_{68}	—	October 5, 2004	Anderson Mesa	LONEOS	(5)	1.2 km	MPC · JPL
339167	2004 TE_{69}	—	July 29, 2004	Siding Spring	SSS	T_{j} (2.99) · HIL · 3:2	7.6 km	MPC · JPL
339168	2004 TW_{77}	—	October 15, 2004	Anderson Mesa	LONEOS	H	520 m	MPC · JPL
339169	2004 TG_{87}	—	October 5, 2004	Kitt Peak	Spacewatch	·	1.0 km	MPC · JPL
339170	2004 TQ_{89}	—	October 5, 2004	Kitt Peak	Spacewatch	·	1.1 km	MPC · JPL
339171	2004 TV_{92}	—	October 5, 2004	Kitt Peak	Spacewatch	·	620 m	MPC · JPL
339172	2004 TQ_{93}	—	October 5, 2004	Kitt Peak	Spacewatch	·	1.1 km	MPC · JPL
339173	2004 TT_{95}	—	October 5, 2004	Kitt Peak	Spacewatch	(5)	1.0 km	MPC · JPL
339174	2004 TQ_{105}	—	October 7, 2004	Kitt Peak	Spacewatch	·	1.0 km	MPC · JPL
339175	2004 TC_{110}	—	October 7, 2004	Socorro	LINEAR	(5)	1.8 km	MPC · JPL
339176	2004 TW_{114}	—	October 8, 2004	Kitt Peak	Spacewatch	·	1.4 km	MPC · JPL
339177	2004 TE_{129}	—	October 7, 2004	Socorro	LINEAR	·	2.1 km	MPC · JPL
339178	2004 TQ_{134}	—	October 8, 2004	Anderson Mesa	LONEOS	·	1.6 km	MPC · JPL
339179	2004 TY_{137}	—	October 8, 2004	Anderson Mesa	LONEOS	H	640 m	MPC · JPL
339180	2004 TD_{143}	—	October 4, 2004	Kitt Peak	Spacewatch	·	1.1 km	MPC · JPL
339181	2004 TV_{145}	—	October 5, 2004	Kitt Peak	Spacewatch	·	1.0 km	MPC · JPL
339182	2004 TM_{147}	—	October 6, 2004	Kitt Peak	Spacewatch	·	1.1 km	MPC · JPL
339183	2004 TG_{150}	—	October 6, 2004	Kitt Peak	Spacewatch	3:2 · SHU	5.4 km	MPC · JPL
339184	2004 TE_{156}	—	October 6, 2004	Kitt Peak	Spacewatch	3:2 · SHU	4.9 km	MPC · JPL
339185	2004 TN_{159}	—	October 6, 2004	Kitt Peak	Spacewatch	KON	3.3 km	MPC · JPL
339186	2004 TP_{162}	—	October 6, 2004	Kitt Peak	Spacewatch	MAR	1.4 km	MPC · JPL
339187	2004 TV_{162}	—	October 6, 2004	Kitt Peak	Spacewatch	·	870 m	MPC · JPL
339188	2004 TM_{166}	—	October 7, 2004	Kitt Peak	Spacewatch	·	1.1 km	MPC · JPL
339189	2004 TC_{170}	—	October 7, 2004	Socorro	LINEAR	·	920 m	MPC · JPL
339190	2004 TG_{171}	—	October 8, 2004	Socorro	LINEAR	H	710 m	MPC · JPL
339191	2004 TB_{184}	—	October 7, 2004	Kitt Peak	Spacewatch	HIL · 3:2	7.1 km	MPC · JPL
339192	2004 TD_{185}	—	October 7, 2004	Kitt Peak	Spacewatch	H	680 m	MPC · JPL
339193	2004 TH_{201}	—	October 7, 2004	Kitt Peak	Spacewatch	·	990 m	MPC · JPL
339194	2004 TK_{202}	—	October 7, 2004	Kitt Peak	Spacewatch	·	930 m	MPC · JPL
339195	2004 TK_{205}	—	October 7, 2004	Kitt Peak	Spacewatch	(5)	1.0 km	MPC · JPL
339196	2004 TR_{209}	—	October 8, 2004	Kitt Peak	Spacewatch	·	1.1 km	MPC · JPL
339197	2004 TX_{211}	—	October 8, 2004	Kitt Peak	Spacewatch	·	840 m	MPC · JPL
339198	2004 TA_{217}	—	October 5, 2004	Kitt Peak	Spacewatch	·	1.2 km	MPC · JPL
339199	2004 TQ_{222}	—	October 7, 2004	Palomar	NEAT	·	1.8 km	MPC · JPL
339200	2004 TE_{224}	—	October 8, 2004	Kitt Peak	Spacewatch	3:2 · SHU	5.5 km	MPC · JPL

== 339201–339300 ==
back to top

Designation			Discovery			Properties		Ref
Permanent	Provisional	Named after	Date	Site	Discoverer(s)	Category	Diam.	Ref
339201	2004 TK_{226}	—	February 12, 2002	Palomar	NEAT	EUN	1.6 km	MPC · JPL
339202	2004 TK_{232}	—	October 8, 2004	Kitt Peak	Spacewatch	T_{j} (2.99) · 3:2	5.6 km	MPC · JPL
339203	2004 TN_{245}	—	April 5, 2003	Kitt Peak	Spacewatch	·	1.2 km	MPC · JPL
339204	2004 TB_{246}	—	October 7, 2004	Kitt Peak	Spacewatch	·	1.0 km	MPC · JPL
339205	2004 TK_{258}	—	October 9, 2004	Kitt Peak	Spacewatch	·	1.3 km	MPC · JPL
339206	2004 TP_{260}	—	October 9, 2004	Kitt Peak	Spacewatch	·	1.1 km	MPC · JPL
339207	2004 TP_{265}	—	October 9, 2004	Kitt Peak	Spacewatch	·	1.2 km	MPC · JPL
339208	2004 TM_{266}	—	October 9, 2004	Kitt Peak	Spacewatch	·	890 m	MPC · JPL
339209	2004 TT_{269}	—	October 9, 2004	Kitt Peak	Spacewatch	·	1.4 km	MPC · JPL
339210	2004 TK_{272}	—	October 9, 2004	Kitt Peak	Spacewatch	·	1.4 km	MPC · JPL
339211	2004 TN_{272}	—	October 9, 2004	Kitt Peak	Spacewatch	·	1.4 km	MPC · JPL
339212	2004 TN_{274}	—	October 9, 2004	Kitt Peak	Spacewatch	·	1.6 km	MPC · JPL
339213	2004 TQ_{274}	—	October 9, 2004	Kitt Peak	Spacewatch	·	1.6 km	MPC · JPL
339214	2004 TT_{275}	—	October 9, 2004	Kitt Peak	Spacewatch	·	1.7 km	MPC · JPL
339215	2004 TH_{276}	—	October 9, 2004	Kitt Peak	Spacewatch	·	1.2 km	MPC · JPL
339216	2004 TT_{287}	—	October 9, 2004	Socorro	LINEAR	H	850 m	MPC · JPL
339217	2004 TB_{288}	—	October 9, 2004	Kitt Peak	Spacewatch	·	1.5 km	MPC · JPL
339218	2004 TH_{299}	—	October 8, 2004	Anderson Mesa	LONEOS	·	870 m	MPC · JPL
339219	2004 TV_{300}	—	October 8, 2004	Socorro	LINEAR	·	1.7 km	MPC · JPL
339220	2004 TW_{308}	—	October 10, 2004	Socorro	LINEAR	·	1.5 km	MPC · JPL
339221	2004 TD_{322}	—	October 11, 2004	Kitt Peak	Spacewatch	·	1.3 km	MPC · JPL
339222	2004 TC_{324}	—	October 11, 2004	Kitt Peak	Spacewatch	·	1.6 km	MPC · JPL
339223 Stongemorin	2004 TN_{325}	Stongemorin	October 13, 2004	Vail-Jarnac	Jarnac	·	840 m	MPC · JPL
339224	2004 TD_{326}	—	October 14, 2004	Socorro	LINEAR	·	1.6 km	MPC · JPL
339225	2004 TD_{327}	—	October 14, 2004	Palomar	NEAT	EUN	1.3 km	MPC · JPL
339226	2004 TE_{331}	—	October 9, 2004	Kitt Peak	Spacewatch	·	980 m	MPC · JPL
339227	2004 TE_{342}	—	October 13, 2004	Anderson Mesa	LONEOS	EUN	1.5 km	MPC · JPL
339228	2004 TD_{347}	—	October 10, 2004	Socorro	LINEAR	·	1.4 km	MPC · JPL
339229	2004 TD_{367}	—	October 4, 2004	Kitt Peak	Spacewatch	(5)	1.2 km	MPC · JPL
339230	2004 TW_{367}	—	October 5, 2004	Kitt Peak	Spacewatch	·	830 m	MPC · JPL
339231	2004 TO_{369}	—	October 10, 2004	Kitt Peak	Spacewatch	·	1.1 km	MPC · JPL
339232	2004 UD	—	October 16, 2004	Socorro	LINEAR	H	890 m	MPC · JPL
339233	2004 UG	—	October 16, 2004	Socorro	LINEAR	·	3.5 km	MPC · JPL
339234	2004 UF_{6}	—	October 20, 2004	Socorro	LINEAR	(5)	1.4 km	MPC · JPL
339235	2004 UH_{9}	—	October 23, 2004	Kitt Peak	Spacewatch	(5)	930 m	MPC · JPL
339236	2004 UK_{9}	—	October 23, 2004	Kitt Peak	Spacewatch	·	1.7 km	MPC · JPL
339237	2004 UT_{9}	—	October 25, 2004	Socorro	LINEAR	H	850 m	MPC · JPL
339238	2004 VG_{1}	—	November 4, 2004	Kitt Peak	Spacewatch	·	2.8 km	MPC · JPL
339239	2004 VU_{6}	—	November 3, 2004	Kitt Peak	Spacewatch	·	3.3 km	MPC · JPL
339240	2004 VS_{15}	—	November 4, 2004	Kitt Peak	Spacewatch	·	1.1 km	MPC · JPL
339241	2004 VS_{16}	—	November 5, 2004	Palomar	NEAT	·	1.0 km	MPC · JPL
339242	2004 VW_{17}	—	November 3, 2004	Palomar	NEAT	·	1.0 km	MPC · JPL
339243	2004 VL_{19}	—	November 4, 2004	Kitt Peak	Spacewatch	·	1.5 km	MPC · JPL
339244	2004 VX_{20}	—	November 4, 2004	Catalina	CSS	·	3.6 km	MPC · JPL
339245	2004 VK_{21}	—	November 4, 2004	Catalina	CSS	·	1.2 km	MPC · JPL
339246	2004 VU_{23}	—	November 5, 2004	Palomar	NEAT	H	630 m	MPC · JPL
339247	2004 VH_{24}	—	November 6, 2004	Palomar	NEAT	(5) · fast	1.7 km	MPC · JPL
339248	2004 VH_{30}	—	November 3, 2004	Kitt Peak	Spacewatch	(5)	1.3 km	MPC · JPL
339249	2004 VV_{38}	—	November 4, 2004	Kitt Peak	Spacewatch	·	1.2 km	MPC · JPL
339250	2004 VJ_{50}	—	November 4, 2004	Kitt Peak	Spacewatch	(194)	1.5 km	MPC · JPL
339251	2004 VH_{53}	—	November 5, 2004	Palomar	NEAT	(5)	1.7 km	MPC · JPL
339252	2004 VB_{54}	—	November 3, 2004	Socorro	LINEAR	·	1.9 km	MPC · JPL
339253	2004 VN_{54}	—	November 4, 2004	Catalina	CSS	H	680 m	MPC · JPL
339254	2004 VN_{55}	—	November 4, 2004	Anderson Mesa	LONEOS	·	2.7 km	MPC · JPL
339255	2004 VJ_{57}	—	November 5, 2004	Palomar	NEAT	·	1.2 km	MPC · JPL
339256	2004 VF_{59}	—	November 9, 2004	Catalina	CSS	·	1.7 km	MPC · JPL
339257	2004 VZ_{59}	—	November 9, 2004	Catalina	CSS	·	1.2 km	MPC · JPL
339258	2004 VQ_{64}	—	November 9, 2004	Catalina	CSS	(1547)	3.0 km	MPC · JPL
339259	2004 VG_{66}	—	November 4, 2004	Kitt Peak	Spacewatch	·	890 m	MPC · JPL
339260	2004 VC_{70}	—	November 11, 2004	Kitt Peak	Spacewatch	·	1.6 km	MPC · JPL
339261	2004 VX_{74}	—	November 11, 2004	Kitt Peak	M. W. Buie	(194)	1.5 km	MPC · JPL
339262	2004 VF_{75}	—	November 4, 2004	Catalina	CSS	H	780 m	MPC · JPL
339263	2004 VS_{88}	—	November 11, 2004	Kitt Peak	Spacewatch	·	1.8 km	MPC · JPL
339264	2004 VW_{89}	—	November 11, 2004	Kitt Peak	Spacewatch	(5)	1.5 km	MPC · JPL
339265	2004 VS_{90}	—	November 2, 2004	Anderson Mesa	LONEOS	H	750 m	MPC · JPL
339266	2004 VD_{91}	—	November 3, 2004	Anderson Mesa	LONEOS	·	1.6 km	MPC · JPL
339267	2004 VJ_{91}	—	November 3, 2004	Kitt Peak	Spacewatch	·	4.1 km	MPC · JPL
339268	2004 VN_{91}	—	November 3, 2004	Anderson Mesa	LONEOS	·	1.2 km	MPC · JPL
339269	2004 WG_{3}	—	November 17, 2004	Siding Spring	SSS	·	1.1 km	MPC · JPL
339270	2004 WH_{6}	—	November 19, 2004	Socorro	LINEAR	·	1.2 km	MPC · JPL
339271	2004 WX_{9}	—	November 30, 2004	Palomar	NEAT	EUN	1.4 km	MPC · JPL
339272	2004 WY_{10}	—	November 20, 2004	Kitt Peak	Spacewatch	·	1.7 km	MPC · JPL
339273	2004 XS_{2}	—	December 2, 2004	Catalina	CSS	·	2.0 km	MPC · JPL
339274	2004 XB_{3}	—	December 2, 2004	Charleston	Astronomical Research Observatory	EUN	1.3 km	MPC · JPL
339275	2004 XD_{7}	—	December 2, 2004	Socorro	LINEAR	·	1.3 km	MPC · JPL
339276	2004 XV_{8}	—	December 2, 2004	Socorro	LINEAR	·	2.6 km	MPC · JPL
339277	2004 XS_{9}	—	December 2, 2004	Catalina	CSS	(5)	1.6 km	MPC · JPL
339278	2004 XR_{10}	—	December 3, 2004	Kitt Peak	Spacewatch	·	1.7 km	MPC · JPL
339279	2004 XU_{10}	—	December 3, 2004	Kitt Peak	Spacewatch	·	1.8 km	MPC · JPL
339280	2004 XQ_{14}	—	December 10, 2004	Kitt Peak	Spacewatch	·	2.1 km	MPC · JPL
339281	2004 XQ_{15}	—	December 9, 2004	Catalina	CSS	·	2.6 km	MPC · JPL
339282	2004 XJ_{17}	—	December 3, 2004	Kitt Peak	Spacewatch	·	2.3 km	MPC · JPL
339283	2004 XB_{18}	—	December 7, 2004	Socorro	LINEAR	EUN	1.7 km	MPC · JPL
339284	2004 XT_{18}	—	December 8, 2004	Socorro	LINEAR	·	1.6 km	MPC · JPL
339285	2004 XD_{20}	—	December 8, 2004	Socorro	LINEAR	MAR	1.2 km	MPC · JPL
339286	2004 XQ_{21}	—	December 8, 2004	Socorro	LINEAR	(5)	1.8 km	MPC · JPL
339287	2004 XT_{23}	—	December 9, 2004	Socorro	LINEAR	·	1.4 km	MPC · JPL
339288	2004 XK_{25}	—	December 9, 2004	Catalina	CSS	EUN	1.8 km	MPC · JPL
339289	2004 XY_{25}	—	December 9, 2004	Kitt Peak	Spacewatch	·	1.4 km	MPC · JPL
339290	2004 XD_{28}	—	December 10, 2004	Socorro	LINEAR	MAR	1.8 km	MPC · JPL
339291	2004 XW_{29}	—	December 10, 2004	Socorro	LINEAR	(5)	1.3 km	MPC · JPL
339292	2004 XA_{41}	—	December 11, 2004	Socorro	LINEAR	·	1.5 km	MPC · JPL
339293	2004 XT_{42}	—	December 8, 2004	Socorro	LINEAR	·	2.2 km	MPC · JPL
339294	2004 XT_{44}	—	December 2, 2004	Catalina	CSS	·	1.9 km	MPC · JPL
339295	2004 XT_{52}	—	December 9, 2004	Kitt Peak	Spacewatch	BRG	1.7 km	MPC · JPL
339296	2004 XB_{59}	—	December 10, 2004	Kitt Peak	Spacewatch	·	1.3 km	MPC · JPL
339297	2004 XK_{63}	—	December 10, 2004	Socorro	LINEAR	·	4.2 km	MPC · JPL
339298	2004 XV_{68}	—	December 8, 2004	Socorro	LINEAR	·	2.6 km	MPC · JPL
339299	2004 XH_{69}	—	December 10, 2004	Socorro	LINEAR	·	1.3 km	MPC · JPL
339300	2004 XK_{70}	—	December 11, 2004	Socorro	LINEAR	RAF	1.4 km	MPC · JPL

== 339301–339400 ==
back to top

Designation			Discovery			Properties		Ref
Permanent	Provisional	Named after	Date	Site	Discoverer(s)	Category	Diam.	Ref
339301	2004 XR_{73}	—	December 11, 2004	Catalina	CSS	·	1.9 km	MPC · JPL
339302	2004 XE_{74}	—	December 8, 2004	Socorro	LINEAR	·	1.2 km	MPC · JPL
339303	2004 XZ_{77}	—	December 10, 2004	Socorro	LINEAR	·	1.9 km	MPC · JPL
339304	2004 XE_{78}	—	December 10, 2004	Socorro	LINEAR	(5)	1.7 km	MPC · JPL
339305	2004 XL_{78}	—	December 10, 2004	Socorro	LINEAR	·	1.4 km	MPC · JPL
339306	2004 XV_{83}	—	December 11, 2004	Kitt Peak	Spacewatch	·	1.3 km	MPC · JPL
339307	2004 XL_{88}	—	December 10, 2004	Kitt Peak	Spacewatch	·	2.3 km	MPC · JPL
339308	2004 XP_{91}	—	December 11, 2004	Kitt Peak	Spacewatch	·	1.4 km	MPC · JPL
339309	2004 XZ_{95}	—	December 11, 2004	Kitt Peak	Spacewatch	(5)	1.4 km	MPC · JPL
339310	2004 XY_{99}	—	December 12, 2004	Kitt Peak	Spacewatch	·	1.8 km	MPC · JPL
339311	2004 XQ_{100}	—	December 14, 2004	Socorro	LINEAR	·	1.2 km	MPC · JPL
339312	2004 XU_{101}	—	December 9, 2004	Catalina	CSS	·	2.0 km	MPC · JPL
339313	2004 XD_{103}	—	December 14, 2004	Catalina	CSS	·	2.7 km	MPC · JPL
339314	2004 XU_{105}	—	December 11, 2004	Socorro	LINEAR	·	1.4 km	MPC · JPL
339315	2004 XW_{107}	—	December 11, 2004	Socorro	LINEAR	·	1.7 km	MPC · JPL
339316	2004 XW_{108}	—	December 12, 2004	Palomar	NEAT	·	1.8 km	MPC · JPL
339317	2004 XF_{111}	—	December 14, 2004	Catalina	CSS	(5)	1.3 km	MPC · JPL
339318	2004 XA_{112}	—	December 10, 2004	Kitt Peak	Spacewatch	EUN	1.5 km	MPC · JPL
339319	2004 XL_{112}	—	December 10, 2004	Kitt Peak	Spacewatch	EUN	1.2 km	MPC · JPL
339320	2004 XS_{115}	—	December 11, 2004	Kitt Peak	Spacewatch	·	1.9 km	MPC · JPL
339321	2004 XZ_{118}	—	December 12, 2004	Kitt Peak	Spacewatch	·	2.5 km	MPC · JPL
339322	2004 XG_{122}	—	December 15, 2004	Kitt Peak	Spacewatch	·	1.5 km	MPC · JPL
339323	2004 XG_{127}	—	December 14, 2004	Socorro	LINEAR	·	3.0 km	MPC · JPL
339324	2004 XA_{132}	—	December 11, 2004	Socorro	LINEAR	·	1.8 km	MPC · JPL
339325	2004 XC_{135}	—	December 15, 2004	Socorro	LINEAR	(5)	1.8 km	MPC · JPL
339326	2004 XV_{142}	—	November 20, 2004	Kitt Peak	Spacewatch	(5)	1.3 km	MPC · JPL
339327	2004 XS_{143}	—	December 9, 2004	Kitt Peak	Spacewatch	(5)	1.6 km	MPC · JPL
339328	2004 XY_{164}	—	December 1, 2004	Catalina	CSS	·	2.5 km	MPC · JPL
339329	2004 XS_{165}	—	December 2, 2004	Socorro	LINEAR	·	1.3 km	MPC · JPL
339330	2004 XH_{174}	—	December 10, 2004	Kitt Peak	Spacewatch	·	2.2 km	MPC · JPL
339331	2004 XZ_{175}	—	December 11, 2004	Catalina	CSS	·	1.2 km	MPC · JPL
339332	2004 XO_{180}	—	December 14, 2004	Kitt Peak	Spacewatch	(5)	1.3 km	MPC · JPL
339333	2004 XF_{181}	—	December 15, 2004	Socorro	LINEAR	·	1.4 km	MPC · JPL
339334	2004 XW_{183}	—	December 9, 2004	Socorro	LINEAR	H	620 m	MPC · JPL
339335	2004 YL_{4}	—	December 17, 2004	Socorro	LINEAR	·	1.6 km	MPC · JPL
339336	2004 YE_{5}	—	December 19, 2004	Mount Lemmon	Mount Lemmon Survey	·	1.5 km	MPC · JPL
339337	2004 YE_{21}	—	December 18, 2004	Mount Lemmon	Mount Lemmon Survey	WIT	1.0 km	MPC · JPL
339338	2004 YG_{31}	—	December 18, 2004	Socorro	LINEAR	(5)	1.5 km	MPC · JPL
339339	2004 YH_{31}	—	December 18, 2004	Socorro	LINEAR	·	2.0 km	MPC · JPL
339340	2004 YS_{31}	—	December 19, 2004	Anderson Mesa	LONEOS	·	2.0 km	MPC · JPL
339341	2004 YL_{32}	—	December 21, 2004	Catalina	CSS	·	2.0 km	MPC · JPL
339342	2005 AE_{1}	—	January 1, 2005	Catalina	CSS	(194)	2.7 km	MPC · JPL
339343	2005 AK_{4}	—	January 6, 2005	Catalina	CSS	(5)	1.7 km	MPC · JPL
339344	2005 AZ_{4}	—	January 6, 2005	Catalina	CSS	·	3.1 km	MPC · JPL
339345	2005 AB_{5}	—	January 6, 2005	Catalina	CSS	·	1.5 km	MPC · JPL
339346	2005 AK_{6}	—	January 6, 2005	Socorro	LINEAR	·	1.8 km	MPC · JPL
339347	2005 AU_{6}	—	January 6, 2005	Catalina	CSS	·	1.9 km	MPC · JPL
339348	2005 AV_{6}	—	January 6, 2005	Catalina	CSS	·	2.6 km	MPC · JPL
339349	2005 AW_{6}	—	January 6, 2005	Catalina	CSS	·	2.0 km	MPC · JPL
339350	2005 AD_{8}	—	January 6, 2005	Catalina	CSS	·	2.2 km	MPC · JPL
339351	2005 AH_{10}	—	January 8, 2005	Pla D'Arguines	R. Ferrando	NEM	2.3 km	MPC · JPL
339352	2005 AF_{14}	—	January 7, 2005	Catalina	CSS	·	2.8 km	MPC · JPL
339353	2005 AJ_{15}	—	January 7, 2005	Socorro	LINEAR	·	1.9 km	MPC · JPL
339354	2005 AY_{22}	—	January 7, 2005	Socorro	LINEAR	·	2.0 km	MPC · JPL
339355	2005 AG_{26}	—	January 11, 2005	Socorro	LINEAR	·	2.0 km	MPC · JPL
339356	2005 AA_{30}	—	January 9, 2005	Catalina	CSS	·	2.8 km	MPC · JPL
339357	2005 AV_{30}	—	January 9, 2005	Catalina	CSS	·	2.6 km	MPC · JPL
339358	2005 AV_{32}	—	January 11, 2005	Socorro	LINEAR	·	1.7 km	MPC · JPL
339359	2005 AO_{33}	—	January 13, 2005	Kitt Peak	Spacewatch	(5)	1.6 km	MPC · JPL
339360	2005 AF_{37}	—	January 13, 2005	Socorro	LINEAR	·	1.8 km	MPC · JPL
339361	2005 AB_{40}	—	January 15, 2005	Catalina	CSS	ADE	2.4 km	MPC · JPL
339362	2005 AC_{42}	—	January 15, 2005	Catalina	CSS	H	850 m	MPC · JPL
339363	2005 AL_{43}	—	January 15, 2005	Socorro	LINEAR	·	2.4 km	MPC · JPL
339364	2005 AE_{44}	—	January 15, 2005	Kitt Peak	Spacewatch	·	1.9 km	MPC · JPL
339365	2005 AF_{44}	—	January 15, 2005	Kitt Peak	Spacewatch	(5)	1.4 km	MPC · JPL
339366	2005 AG_{44}	—	January 15, 2005	Kitt Peak	Spacewatch	·	1.9 km	MPC · JPL
339367	2005 AJ_{45}	—	January 15, 2005	Socorro	LINEAR	·	2.8 km	MPC · JPL
339368	2005 AG_{46}	—	January 11, 2005	Socorro	LINEAR	·	1.2 km	MPC · JPL
339369	2005 AD_{51}	—	January 13, 2005	Kitt Peak	Spacewatch	L5	10 km	MPC · JPL
339370	2005 AE_{56}	—	January 15, 2005	Socorro	LINEAR	·	2.4 km	MPC · JPL
339371	2005 AV_{56}	—	January 15, 2005	Catalina	CSS	·	1.8 km	MPC · JPL
339372	2005 AJ_{59}	—	January 15, 2005	Socorro	LINEAR	·	1.8 km	MPC · JPL
339373	2005 AZ_{59}	—	January 15, 2005	Kitt Peak	Spacewatch	·	2.6 km	MPC · JPL
339374	2005 AJ_{64}	—	January 13, 2005	Kitt Peak	Spacewatch	·	1.3 km	MPC · JPL
339375	2005 AO_{64}	—	January 13, 2005	Kitt Peak	Spacewatch	·	1.4 km	MPC · JPL
339376	2005 AF_{66}	—	January 13, 2005	Kitt Peak	Spacewatch	·	2.7 km	MPC · JPL
339377	2005 AW_{67}	—	January 13, 2005	Socorro	LINEAR	·	2.2 km	MPC · JPL
339378	2005 AY_{68}	—	January 13, 2005	Kitt Peak	Spacewatch	·	2.5 km	MPC · JPL
339379	2005 AZ_{68}	—	January 15, 2005	Anderson Mesa	LONEOS	·	2.2 km	MPC · JPL
339380	2005 AR_{76}	—	January 15, 2005	Kitt Peak	Spacewatch	L5	8.2 km	MPC · JPL
339381	2005 AK_{78}	—	January 15, 2005	Kitt Peak	Spacewatch	H	560 m	MPC · JPL
339382	2005 AW_{78}	—	January 15, 2005	Kitt Peak	Spacewatch	L5	9.9 km	MPC · JPL
339383	2005 AC_{79}	—	January 15, 2005	Kitt Peak	Spacewatch	·	1.4 km	MPC · JPL
339384	2005 BZ_{1}	—	January 18, 2005	Wrightwood	J. W. Young	·	1.7 km	MPC · JPL
339385	2005 BU_{2}	—	January 19, 2005	Wrightwood	J. W. Young	·	1.5 km	MPC · JPL
339386	2005 BL_{6}	—	January 16, 2005	Socorro	LINEAR	·	1.4 km	MPC · JPL
339387	2005 BP_{8}	—	January 16, 2005	Socorro	LINEAR	·	2.4 km	MPC · JPL
339388	2005 BY_{8}	—	January 16, 2005	Kitt Peak	Spacewatch	(5)	1.7 km	MPC · JPL
339389	2005 BB_{13}	—	January 17, 2005	Socorro	LINEAR	·	1.4 km	MPC · JPL
339390	2005 BL_{16}	—	January 16, 2005	Socorro	LINEAR	·	2.2 km	MPC · JPL
339391	2005 BC_{21}	—	January 16, 2005	Socorro	LINEAR	·	3.0 km	MPC · JPL
339392	2005 BA_{24}	—	January 17, 2005	Socorro	LINEAR	·	1.6 km	MPC · JPL
339393	2005 BT_{27}	—	January 31, 2005	Goodricke-Pigott	R. A. Tucker	·	3.4 km	MPC · JPL
339394	2005 BN_{28}	—	January 31, 2005	Mayhill	Lowe, A.	·	2.1 km	MPC · JPL
339395	2005 BA_{48}	—	January 16, 2005	Mauna Kea	P. A. Wiegert	·	1.8 km	MPC · JPL
339396	2005 BO_{48}	—	January 17, 2005	Kitt Peak	Spacewatch	·	1.1 km	MPC · JPL
339397	2005 BE_{49}	—	January 16, 2005	Catalina	CSS	·	2.2 km	MPC · JPL
339398	2005 CC_{1}	—	February 1, 2005	Catalina	CSS	·	2.5 km	MPC · JPL
339399	2005 CS_{3}	—	February 1, 2005	Kitt Peak	Spacewatch	NEM	2.7 km	MPC · JPL
339400	2005 CS_{10}	—	February 1, 2005	Kitt Peak	Spacewatch	·	2.8 km	MPC · JPL

== 339401–339500 ==
back to top

Designation			Discovery			Properties		Ref
Permanent	Provisional	Named after	Date	Site	Discoverer(s)	Category	Diam.	Ref
339401	2005 CD_{12}	—	February 1, 2005	Palomar	NEAT	·	1.9 km	MPC · JPL
339402	2005 CO_{13}	—	February 2, 2005	Kitt Peak	Spacewatch	·	1.8 km	MPC · JPL
339403	2005 CL_{14}	—	February 2, 2005	Kitt Peak	Spacewatch	·	2.5 km	MPC · JPL
339404	2005 CG_{24}	—	February 2, 2005	Catalina	CSS	·	1.9 km	MPC · JPL
339405	2005 CN_{24}	—	February 3, 2005	Socorro	LINEAR	·	1.9 km	MPC · JPL
339406	2005 CA_{35}	—	February 2, 2005	Kitt Peak	Spacewatch	KOR	1.6 km	MPC · JPL
339407	2005 CX_{49}	—	February 2, 2005	Socorro	LINEAR	·	3.1 km	MPC · JPL
339408	2005 CD_{50}	—	February 2, 2005	Socorro	LINEAR	·	1.4 km	MPC · JPL
339409	2005 CX_{52}	—	February 3, 2005	Socorro	LINEAR	·	2.2 km	MPC · JPL
339410	2005 CY_{56}	—	February 2, 2005	Socorro	LINEAR	HNS	1.7 km	MPC · JPL
339411	2005 CQ_{57}	—	February 2, 2005	Socorro	LINEAR	·	2.3 km	MPC · JPL
339412	2005 CP_{58}	—	February 2, 2005	Catalina	CSS	·	2.0 km	MPC · JPL
339413	2005 CB_{63}	—	February 9, 2005	Anderson Mesa	LONEOS	·	2.1 km	MPC · JPL
339414	2005 CA_{65}	—	February 9, 2005	Mount Lemmon	Mount Lemmon Survey	·	2.5 km	MPC · JPL
339415	2005 CF_{65}	—	February 9, 2005	Mount Lemmon	Mount Lemmon Survey	·	1.9 km	MPC · JPL
339416	2005 CJ_{70}	—	February 8, 2005	Mauna Kea	Veillet, C.	·	1.8 km	MPC · JPL
339417	2005 EC_{3}	—	March 1, 2005	Kitt Peak	Spacewatch	·	3.0 km	MPC · JPL
339418	2005 EH_{7}	—	March 1, 2005	Kitt Peak	Spacewatch	·	2.6 km	MPC · JPL
339419	2005 EL_{7}	—	March 1, 2005	Kitt Peak	Spacewatch	·	2.9 km	MPC · JPL
339420	2005 EU_{26}	—	March 3, 2005	Catalina	CSS	·	3.4 km	MPC · JPL
339421	2005 EQ_{31}	—	March 2, 2005	Catalina	CSS	·	1.4 km	MPC · JPL
339422	2005 EM_{37}	—	March 3, 2005	Catalina	CSS	·	2.8 km	MPC · JPL
339423	2005 EX_{45}	—	March 3, 2005	Catalina	CSS	·	2.7 km	MPC · JPL
339424	2005 EM_{60}	—	March 4, 2005	Catalina	CSS	·	1.8 km	MPC · JPL
339425	2005 EB_{67}	—	March 4, 2005	Mount Lemmon	Mount Lemmon Survey	·	2.1 km	MPC · JPL
339426	2005 ET_{79}	—	March 3, 2005	Catalina	CSS	·	2.5 km	MPC · JPL
339427	2005 EZ_{81}	—	March 4, 2005	Kitt Peak	Spacewatch	·	2.6 km	MPC · JPL
339428	2005 EQ_{82}	—	March 4, 2005	Kitt Peak	Spacewatch	·	2.3 km	MPC · JPL
339429	2005 ER_{83}	—	March 4, 2005	Kitt Peak	Spacewatch	·	3.3 km	MPC · JPL
339430	2005 EY_{84}	—	March 4, 2005	Catalina	CSS	·	3.3 km	MPC · JPL
339431	2005 EK_{85}	—	March 4, 2005	Socorro	LINEAR	·	2.3 km	MPC · JPL
339432	2005 EQ_{86}	—	March 4, 2005	Socorro	LINEAR	DOR	3.2 km	MPC · JPL
339433	2005 ED_{88}	—	March 7, 2005	Socorro	LINEAR	·	4.1 km	MPC · JPL
339434	2005 EB_{93}	—	March 8, 2005	Socorro	LINEAR	·	2.3 km	MPC · JPL
339435	2005 EN_{93}	—	March 8, 2005	Socorro	LINEAR	·	2.5 km	MPC · JPL
339436	2005 EB_{100}	—	March 3, 2005	Catalina	CSS	·	3.1 km	MPC · JPL
339437	2005 EC_{130}	—	March 9, 2005	Kitt Peak	Spacewatch	(13314)	2.9 km	MPC · JPL
339438	2005 EA_{133}	—	March 9, 2005	Catalina	CSS	·	3.3 km	MPC · JPL
339439	2005 EP_{147}	—	March 10, 2005	Mount Lemmon	Mount Lemmon Survey	·	1.9 km	MPC · JPL
339440	2005 EK_{152}	—	March 10, 2005	Kitt Peak	Spacewatch	·	3.8 km	MPC · JPL
339441	2005 EE_{154}	—	March 8, 2005	Anderson Mesa	LONEOS	·	3.6 km	MPC · JPL
339442	2005 EX_{155}	—	March 8, 2005	Mount Lemmon	Mount Lemmon Survey	THM	2.6 km	MPC · JPL
339443	2005 ET_{158}	—	March 9, 2005	Mount Lemmon	Mount Lemmon Survey	KOR	1.5 km	MPC · JPL
339444	2005 EH_{160}	—	March 9, 2005	Mount Lemmon	Mount Lemmon Survey	KOR	1.7 km	MPC · JPL
339445	2005 EA_{163}	—	March 10, 2005	Mount Lemmon	Mount Lemmon Survey	·	2.4 km	MPC · JPL
339446	2005 EF_{168}	—	March 11, 2005	Mount Lemmon	Mount Lemmon Survey	·	1.9 km	MPC · JPL
339447	2005 EN_{179}	—	March 9, 2005	Kitt Peak	Spacewatch	KOR	1.7 km	MPC · JPL
339448	2005 EO_{187}	—	March 10, 2005	Mount Lemmon	Mount Lemmon Survey	·	2.1 km	MPC · JPL
339449	2005 ER_{189}	—	March 11, 2005	Kitt Peak	Spacewatch	·	3.0 km	MPC · JPL
339450	2005 ED_{193}	—	March 11, 2005	Mount Lemmon	Mount Lemmon Survey	AGN	1.3 km	MPC · JPL
339451	2005 EF_{193}	—	March 11, 2005	Mount Lemmon	Mount Lemmon Survey	EOS	1.5 km	MPC · JPL
339452	2005 ET_{193}	—	March 11, 2005	Mount Lemmon	Mount Lemmon Survey	KOR	1.5 km	MPC · JPL
339453	2005 EH_{194}	—	March 11, 2005	Mount Lemmon	Mount Lemmon Survey	·	2.3 km	MPC · JPL
339454	2005 EM_{195}	—	March 11, 2005	Mount Lemmon	Mount Lemmon Survey	KOR	2.0 km	MPC · JPL
339455	2005 EV_{197}	—	March 11, 2005	Mount Lemmon	Mount Lemmon Survey	·	2.2 km	MPC · JPL
339456	2005 EC_{198}	—	March 11, 2005	Mount Lemmon	Mount Lemmon Survey	NAE	2.7 km	MPC · JPL
339457	2005 EG_{202}	—	March 8, 2005	Socorro	LINEAR	·	2.4 km	MPC · JPL
339458	2005 EW_{206}	—	March 13, 2005	Kitt Peak	Spacewatch	·	3.7 km	MPC · JPL
339459	2005 EZ_{209}	—	March 4, 2005	Kitt Peak	Spacewatch	·	1.8 km	MPC · JPL
339460	2005 EP_{210}	—	March 4, 2005	Kitt Peak	Spacewatch	·	1.6 km	MPC · JPL
339461	2005 EC_{219}	—	March 10, 2005	Mount Lemmon	Mount Lemmon Survey	·	2.3 km	MPC · JPL
339462	2005 EN_{222}	—	March 10, 2005	Anderson Mesa	LONEOS	EUP	4.6 km	MPC · JPL
339463	2005 EZ_{227}	—	March 10, 2005	Mount Lemmon	Mount Lemmon Survey	·	2.2 km	MPC · JPL
339464	2005 EL_{231}	—	March 10, 2005	Mount Lemmon	Mount Lemmon Survey	·	2.2 km	MPC · JPL
339465	2005 EY_{239}	—	March 11, 2005	Kitt Peak	Spacewatch	KOR	1.9 km	MPC · JPL
339466	2005 EU_{242}	—	March 11, 2005	Catalina	CSS	·	3.0 km	MPC · JPL
339467	2005 EW_{243}	—	March 11, 2005	Kitt Peak	Spacewatch	EOS	2.3 km	MPC · JPL
339468	2005 EX_{243}	—	March 11, 2005	Anderson Mesa	LONEOS	JUN	1.5 km	MPC · JPL
339469	2005 EX_{245}	—	March 3, 2005	Kitt Peak	Spacewatch	·	2.2 km	MPC · JPL
339470	2005 EC_{250}	—	March 14, 2005	Catalina	CSS	·	2.2 km	MPC · JPL
339471	2005 EU_{252}	—	March 10, 2005	Mount Lemmon	Mount Lemmon Survey	·	2.5 km	MPC · JPL
339472	2005 EG_{258}	—	March 11, 2005	Mount Lemmon	Mount Lemmon Survey	·	3.3 km	MPC · JPL
339473	2005 EU_{262}	—	March 13, 2005	Kitt Peak	Spacewatch	·	2.3 km	MPC · JPL
339474	2005 EB_{283}	—	March 11, 2005	Kitt Peak	Spacewatch	KOR	2.1 km	MPC · JPL
339475	2005 EK_{287}	—	March 7, 2005	Socorro	LINEAR	JUN	1.4 km	MPC · JPL
339476	2005 EA_{295}	—	March 12, 2005	Socorro	LINEAR	KOR	2.3 km	MPC · JPL
339477	2005 ET_{304}	—	March 11, 2005	Kitt Peak	M. W. Buie	EOS	2.9 km	MPC · JPL
339478	2005 EU_{315}	—	March 11, 2005	Kitt Peak	Spacewatch	·	1.4 km	MPC · JPL
339479	2005 EN_{316}	—	March 11, 2005	Kitt Peak	M. W. Buie	KOR	1.7 km	MPC · JPL
339480	2005 EQ_{321}	—	March 11, 2005	Mount Lemmon	Mount Lemmon Survey	·	1.7 km	MPC · JPL
339481	2005 EA_{327}	—	March 9, 2005	Anderson Mesa	LONEOS	·	2.6 km	MPC · JPL
339482	2005 FB_{3}	—	March 21, 2005	Goodricke-Pigott	R. A. Tucker	·	4.5 km	MPC · JPL
339483	2005 FQ_{3}	—	March 16, 2005	Mount Lemmon	Mount Lemmon Survey	·	1.9 km	MPC · JPL
339484	2005 FH_{5}	—	March 31, 2005	Anderson Mesa	LONEOS	·	2.1 km	MPC · JPL
339485	2005 GQ_{2}	—	April 1, 2005	Kitt Peak	Spacewatch	·	3.0 km	MPC · JPL
339486 Raimeux	2005 GV_{9}	Raimeux	April 3, 2005	Vicques	M. Ory	·	2.0 km	MPC · JPL
339487	2005 GK_{10}	—	April 1, 2005	Kitt Peak	Spacewatch	·	2.3 km	MPC · JPL
339488	2005 GV_{10}	—	April 1, 2005	Kitt Peak	Spacewatch	·	3.3 km	MPC · JPL
339489	2005 GG_{13}	—	April 1, 2005	Kitt Peak	Spacewatch	EOS	5.7 km	MPC · JPL
339490	2005 GR_{14}	—	April 2, 2005	Kitt Peak	Spacewatch	·	3.9 km	MPC · JPL
339491	2005 GC_{20}	—	April 2, 2005	Mount Lemmon	Mount Lemmon Survey	·	3.4 km	MPC · JPL
339492	2005 GQ_{21}	—	April 4, 2005	Socorro	LINEAR	AMO	750 m	MPC · JPL
339493	2005 GE_{25}	—	April 2, 2005	Mount Lemmon	Mount Lemmon Survey	·	1.8 km	MPC · JPL
339494	2005 GR_{34}	—	April 1, 2005	Anderson Mesa	LONEOS	·	2.2 km	MPC · JPL
339495	2005 GW_{34}	—	April 2, 2005	Anderson Mesa	LONEOS	H	820 m	MPC · JPL
339496	2005 GZ_{35}	—	April 2, 2005	Mount Lemmon	Mount Lemmon Survey	·	1.8 km	MPC · JPL
339497	2005 GD_{36}	—	April 2, 2005	Mount Lemmon	Mount Lemmon Survey	KOR	1.4 km	MPC · JPL
339498	2005 GC_{40}	—	April 4, 2005	Mount Lemmon	Mount Lemmon Survey	·	2.6 km	MPC · JPL
339499	2005 GA_{49}	—	April 5, 2005	Mount Lemmon	Mount Lemmon Survey	EOS	2.2 km	MPC · JPL
339500	2005 GT_{52}	—	April 2, 2005	Mount Lemmon	Mount Lemmon Survey	·	3.4 km	MPC · JPL

== 339501–339600 ==
back to top

Designation			Discovery			Properties		Ref
Permanent	Provisional	Named after	Date	Site	Discoverer(s)	Category	Diam.	Ref
339501	2005 GR_{55}	—	April 6, 2005	Anderson Mesa	LONEOS	JUN	1.6 km	MPC · JPL
339502	2005 GG_{60}	—	April 2, 2005	Anderson Mesa	LONEOS	TIR	3.0 km	MPC · JPL
339503	2005 GM_{60}	—	April 5, 2005	Vail-Jarnac	Jarnac	·	5.0 km	MPC · JPL
339504	2005 GJ_{65}	—	April 2, 2005	Palomar	NEAT	·	2.5 km	MPC · JPL
339505	2005 GS_{69}	—	April 3, 2005	Palomar	NEAT	·	4.6 km	MPC · JPL
339506	2005 GP_{83}	—	April 4, 2005	Kitt Peak	Spacewatch	·	3.0 km	MPC · JPL
339507	2005 GO_{97}	—	April 7, 2005	Kitt Peak	Spacewatch	·	2.8 km	MPC · JPL
339508	2005 GR_{100}	—	April 9, 2005	Kitt Peak	Spacewatch	EOS	1.9 km	MPC · JPL
339509	2005 GN_{102}	—	April 9, 2005	Kitt Peak	Spacewatch	·	2.8 km	MPC · JPL
339510	2005 GV_{102}	—	April 9, 2005	Kitt Peak	Spacewatch	VER	4.8 km	MPC · JPL
339511	2005 GZ_{107}	—	April 10, 2005	Mount Lemmon	Mount Lemmon Survey	·	2.2 km	MPC · JPL
339512	2005 GL_{108}	—	April 10, 2005	Mount Lemmon	Mount Lemmon Survey	KOR	1.5 km	MPC · JPL
339513	2005 GA_{113}	—	April 6, 2005	Catalina	CSS	·	3.9 km	MPC · JPL
339514	2005 GZ_{113}	—	April 9, 2005	Socorro	LINEAR	T_{j} (2.95)	5.0 km	MPC · JPL
339515	2005 GJ_{134}	—	September 11, 2001	Kitt Peak	Spacewatch	·	2.6 km	MPC · JPL
339516	2005 GB_{136}	—	April 10, 2005	Kitt Peak	Spacewatch	·	2.4 km	MPC · JPL
339517	2005 GE_{136}	—	April 10, 2005	Kitt Peak	Spacewatch	ARM	4.3 km	MPC · JPL
339518	2005 GW_{139}	—	April 12, 2005	Mount Lemmon	Mount Lemmon Survey	·	1.6 km	MPC · JPL
339519	2005 GM_{154}	—	April 9, 2005	Socorro	LINEAR	·	4.0 km	MPC · JPL
339520	2005 GV_{155}	—	April 10, 2005	Mount Lemmon	Mount Lemmon Survey	·	2.5 km	MPC · JPL
339521	2005 GU_{157}	—	April 11, 2005	Mount Lemmon	Mount Lemmon Survey	·	4.1 km	MPC · JPL
339522	2005 GZ_{158}	—	April 12, 2005	Kitt Peak	Spacewatch	HYG	3.3 km	MPC · JPL
339523	2005 GH_{173}	—	April 14, 2005	Kitt Peak	Spacewatch	·	2.5 km	MPC · JPL
339524	2005 GF_{175}	—	April 14, 2005	Kitt Peak	Spacewatch	EOS	2.0 km	MPC · JPL
339525	2005 GL_{205}	—	December 18, 2003	Kitt Peak	Spacewatch	·	1.7 km	MPC · JPL
339526	2005 GA_{216}	—	March 8, 2005	Mount Lemmon	Mount Lemmon Survey	·	4.8 km	MPC · JPL
339527	2005 GG_{221}	—	October 16, 2003	Kitt Peak	Spacewatch	·	2.7 km	MPC · JPL
339528	2005 GH_{225}	—	April 14, 2005	Kitt Peak	Spacewatch	EOS	2.3 km	MPC · JPL
339529	2005 GV_{227}	—	April 6, 2005	Anderson Mesa	LONEOS	·	3.0 km	MPC · JPL
339530	2005 HT_{1}	—	April 16, 2005	Kitt Peak	Spacewatch	·	4.9 km	MPC · JPL
339531	2005 HB_{5}	—	April 30, 2005	Kitt Peak	Spacewatch	·	710 m	MPC · JPL
339532	2005 JU_{3}	—	May 1, 2005	Siding Spring	SSS	·	3.8 km	MPC · JPL
339533	2005 JD_{4}	—	May 3, 2005	Catalina	CSS	LIX	5.0 km	MPC · JPL
339534	2005 JL_{14}	—	May 1, 2005	Palomar	NEAT	·	3.9 km	MPC · JPL
339535	2005 JA_{15}	—	May 2, 2005	Kitt Peak	Spacewatch	·	2.1 km	MPC · JPL
339536	2005 JU_{26}	—	May 3, 2005	Kitt Peak	Spacewatch	·	2.8 km	MPC · JPL
339537	2005 JO_{34}	—	May 4, 2005	Kitt Peak	Spacewatch	·	4.2 km	MPC · JPL
339538	2005 JN_{46}	—	May 3, 2005	Kitt Peak	Spacewatch	EOS	1.9 km	MPC · JPL
339539	2005 JZ_{46}	—	May 3, 2005	Kitt Peak	Spacewatch	EOS	2.2 km	MPC · JPL
339540	2005 JK_{49}	—	May 4, 2005	Kitt Peak	Spacewatch	·	2.8 km	MPC · JPL
339541	2005 JS_{50}	—	May 4, 2005	Kitt Peak	Spacewatch	·	2.1 km	MPC · JPL
339542	2005 JA_{59}	—	May 8, 2005	Mount Lemmon	Mount Lemmon Survey	·	2.6 km	MPC · JPL
339543	2005 JC_{59}	—	May 8, 2005	Mount Lemmon	Mount Lemmon Survey	·	3.1 km	MPC · JPL
339544	2005 JJ_{62}	—	May 9, 2005	Socorro	LINEAR	·	2.5 km	MPC · JPL
339545	2005 JD_{65}	—	April 16, 2005	Kitt Peak	Spacewatch	·	3.3 km	MPC · JPL
339546	2005 JE_{73}	—	May 8, 2005	Kitt Peak	Spacewatch	·	3.0 km	MPC · JPL
339547	2005 JA_{74}	—	May 8, 2005	Kitt Peak	Spacewatch	·	3.3 km	MPC · JPL
339548	2005 JB_{78}	—	May 10, 2005	Kitt Peak	Spacewatch	·	580 m	MPC · JPL
339549	2005 JF_{93}	—	May 11, 2005	Palomar	NEAT	·	2.5 km	MPC · JPL
339550	2005 JV_{94}	—	May 7, 2005	Mount Lemmon	Mount Lemmon Survey	·	2.5 km	MPC · JPL
339551	2005 JZ_{103}	—	May 10, 2005	Mount Lemmon	Mount Lemmon Survey	THM	2.4 km	MPC · JPL
339552	2005 JO_{105}	—	May 11, 2005	Mount Lemmon	Mount Lemmon Survey	·	2.7 km	MPC · JPL
339553	2005 JE_{106}	—	May 11, 2005	Mount Lemmon	Mount Lemmon Survey	·	3.5 km	MPC · JPL
339554	2005 JH_{110}	—	April 17, 2005	Kitt Peak	Spacewatch	·	4.7 km	MPC · JPL
339555	2005 JM_{112}	—	May 9, 2005	Catalina	CSS	·	4.0 km	MPC · JPL
339556	2005 JA_{121}	—	May 10, 2005	Kitt Peak	Spacewatch	·	4.1 km	MPC · JPL
339557	2005 JE_{127}	—	May 12, 2005	Mount Lemmon	Mount Lemmon Survey	·	3.6 km	MPC · JPL
339558	2005 JG_{136}	—	May 11, 2005	Catalina	CSS	·	4.1 km	MPC · JPL
339559	2005 JW_{138}	—	May 13, 2005	Mount Lemmon	Mount Lemmon Survey	TIR	3.3 km	MPC · JPL
339560	2005 JW_{143}	—	May 15, 2005	Mount Lemmon	Mount Lemmon Survey	·	580 m	MPC · JPL
339561	2005 JR_{149}	—	May 3, 2005	Kitt Peak	Spacewatch	·	560 m	MPC · JPL
339562	2005 JF_{162}	—	May 8, 2005	Kitt Peak	Spacewatch	L4	10 km	MPC · JPL
339563	2005 JT_{169}	—	May 9, 2005	Cerro Tololo	M. W. Buie	KOR	1.3 km	MPC · JPL
339564	2005 KE_{2}	—	May 16, 2005	Mount Lemmon	Mount Lemmon Survey	·	3.3 km	MPC · JPL
339565	2005 KH_{4}	—	May 17, 2005	Mount Lemmon	Mount Lemmon Survey	·	3.7 km	MPC · JPL
339566	2005 KF_{8}	—	May 20, 2005	Mount Lemmon	Mount Lemmon Survey	·	3.0 km	MPC · JPL
339567	2005 LR	—	June 1, 2005	Kitt Peak	Spacewatch	·	6.1 km	MPC · JPL
339568	2005 LP_{4}	—	June 1, 2005	Kitt Peak	Spacewatch	·	3.1 km	MPC · JPL
339569	2005 LR_{6}	—	June 4, 2005	Socorro	LINEAR	EUP	3.9 km	MPC · JPL
339570	2005 LR_{8}	—	June 1, 2005	Kitt Peak	Spacewatch	TIR	4.2 km	MPC · JPL
339571	2005 LF_{13}	—	June 4, 2005	Kitt Peak	Spacewatch	·	3.3 km	MPC · JPL
339572	2005 LZ_{14}	—	June 8, 2005	Kitt Peak	Spacewatch	·	3.4 km	MPC · JPL
339573	2005 LS_{16}	—	June 6, 2005	Kitt Peak	Spacewatch	·	3.7 km	MPC · JPL
339574	2005 LR_{23}	—	June 10, 2005	Kitt Peak	Spacewatch	·	2.7 km	MPC · JPL
339575	2005 LF_{25}	—	June 8, 2005	Kitt Peak	Spacewatch	EOS	2.3 km	MPC · JPL
339576	2005 LC_{32}	—	June 8, 2005	Kitt Peak	Spacewatch	·	780 m	MPC · JPL
339577	2005 LP_{37}	—	June 11, 2005	Kitt Peak	Spacewatch	·	5.0 km	MPC · JPL
339578	2005 LA_{51}	—	June 13, 2005	Mount Lemmon	Mount Lemmon Survey	·	800 m	MPC · JPL
339579	2005 MX_{11}	—	June 28, 2005	Kitt Peak	Spacewatch	TIR	3.3 km	MPC · JPL
339580	2005 MK_{13}	—	June 29, 2005	Palomar	NEAT	·	1.2 km	MPC · JPL
339581	2005 MR_{14}	—	June 29, 2005	Kitt Peak	Spacewatch	·	3.4 km	MPC · JPL
339582	2005 MY_{18}	—	June 29, 2005	Kitt Peak	Spacewatch	·	3.9 km	MPC · JPL
339583	2005 MA_{21}	—	June 30, 2005	Catalina	CSS	·	1.1 km	MPC · JPL
339584	2005 MG_{23}	—	June 30, 2005	Socorro	LINEAR	·	1.5 km	MPC · JPL
339585	2005 MY_{30}	—	June 30, 2005	Kitt Peak	Spacewatch	VER	3.4 km	MPC · JPL
339586	2005 MM_{32}	—	June 28, 2005	Palomar	NEAT	·	1.1 km	MPC · JPL
339587	2005 MG_{35}	—	June 30, 2005	Kitt Peak	Spacewatch	·	750 m	MPC · JPL
339588	2005 MO_{35}	—	June 30, 2005	Kitt Peak	Spacewatch	·	880 m	MPC · JPL
339589	2005 MJ_{40}	—	June 30, 2005	Kitt Peak	Spacewatch	·	740 m	MPC · JPL
339590	2005 MA_{43}	—	June 30, 2005	Palomar	NEAT	·	4.8 km	MPC · JPL
339591	2005 ME_{47}	—	June 28, 2005	Palomar	NEAT	·	1.0 km	MPC · JPL
339592	2005 MU_{50}	—	June 30, 2005	Kitt Peak	Spacewatch	·	790 m	MPC · JPL
339593	2005 MQ_{53}	—	June 17, 2005	Mount Lemmon	Mount Lemmon Survey	·	870 m	MPC · JPL
339594	2005 NW_{16}	—	July 2, 2005	Kitt Peak	Spacewatch	·	630 m	MPC · JPL
339595	2005 NQ_{22}	—	July 1, 2005	Kitt Peak	Spacewatch	·	880 m	MPC · JPL
339596	2005 NA_{29}	—	July 5, 2005	Palomar	NEAT	·	670 m	MPC · JPL
339597	2005 NX_{36}	—	July 6, 2005	Kitt Peak	Spacewatch	·	1.0 km	MPC · JPL
339598	2005 NQ_{40}	—	July 3, 2005	Mount Lemmon	Mount Lemmon Survey	·	710 m	MPC · JPL
339599	2005 NS_{54}	—	July 10, 2005	Kitt Peak	Spacewatch	·	800 m	MPC · JPL
339600	2005 NX_{54}	—	July 10, 2005	Kitt Peak	Spacewatch	·	620 m	MPC · JPL

== 339601–339700 ==
back to top

Designation			Discovery			Properties		Ref
Permanent	Provisional	Named after	Date	Site	Discoverer(s)	Category	Diam.	Ref
339601	2005 NV_{67}	—	July 3, 2005	Mount Lemmon	Mount Lemmon Survey	·	780 m	MPC · JPL
339602	2005 NR_{87}	—	July 4, 2005	Kitt Peak	Spacewatch	·	760 m	MPC · JPL
339603	2005 NV_{97}	—	July 9, 2005	Kitt Peak	Spacewatch	·	710 m	MPC · JPL
339604	2005 NX_{122}	—	July 4, 2005	Mount Lemmon	Mount Lemmon Survey	·	1.0 km	MPC · JPL
339605	2005 OQ	—	July 16, 2005	Kitt Peak	Spacewatch	·	750 m	MPC · JPL
339606	2005 OT_{3}	—	July 10, 2005	Siding Spring	SSS	·	950 m	MPC · JPL
339607	2005 OW_{3}	—	July 28, 2005	Reedy Creek	J. Broughton	V	660 m	MPC · JPL
339608	2005 OE_{6}	—	July 28, 2005	Palomar	NEAT	·	810 m	MPC · JPL
339609	2005 OP_{6}	—	July 28, 2005	Palomar	NEAT	·	930 m	MPC · JPL
339610	2005 OA_{8}	—	July 30, 2005	Campo Imperatore	CINEOS	·	650 m	MPC · JPL
339611	2005 OG_{9}	—	July 4, 2005	Palomar	NEAT	·	740 m	MPC · JPL
339612	2005 OK_{12}	—	July 29, 2005	Palomar	NEAT	·	1.1 km	MPC · JPL
339613	2005 OW_{13}	—	July 30, 2005	Palomar	NEAT	·	830 m	MPC · JPL
339614	2005 OF_{16}	—	July 29, 2005	Palomar	NEAT	·	730 m	MPC · JPL
339615	2005 OD_{19}	—	July 31, 2005	Palomar	NEAT	·	840 m	MPC · JPL
339616	2005 OE_{19}	—	July 31, 2005	Palomar	NEAT	·	950 m	MPC · JPL
339617	2005 OS_{19}	—	July 28, 2005	Palomar	NEAT	·	940 m	MPC · JPL
339618	2005 OB_{24}	—	July 30, 2005	Palomar	NEAT	·	890 m	MPC · JPL
339619	2005 ON_{28}	—	July 30, 2005	Palomar	NEAT	·	1.0 km	MPC · JPL
339620	2005 PL_{4}	—	August 7, 2005	Siding Spring	SSS	·	1.1 km	MPC · JPL
339621	2005 PZ_{5}	—	August 9, 2005	Ottmarsheim	Ottmarsheim	PHO	1.7 km	MPC · JPL
339622	2005 PE_{13}	—	August 4, 2005	Palomar	NEAT	·	850 m	MPC · JPL
339623	2005 PA_{18}	—	August 12, 2005	Pla D'Arguines	R. Ferrando, Ferrando, M.	·	810 m	MPC · JPL
339624	2005 PA_{20}	—	August 6, 2005	Palomar	NEAT	NYS	1.1 km	MPC · JPL
339625	2005 QY	—	August 22, 2005	Palomar	NEAT	V	690 m	MPC · JPL
339626	2005 QF_{5}	—	July 27, 2005	Palomar	NEAT	·	970 m	MPC · JPL
339627	2005 QG_{7}	—	August 24, 2005	Palomar	NEAT	·	970 m	MPC · JPL
339628	2005 QT_{8}	—	August 25, 2005	Palomar	NEAT	NYS	1.1 km	MPC · JPL
339629	2005 QV_{9}	—	August 25, 2005	Palomar	NEAT	·	1.1 km	MPC · JPL
339630	2005 QX_{9}	—	August 25, 2005	Campo Imperatore	CINEOS	·	890 m	MPC · JPL
339631	2005 QE_{14}	—	August 24, 2005	Palomar	NEAT	·	1.1 km	MPC · JPL
339632	2005 QU_{16}	—	August 25, 2005	Palomar	NEAT	·	850 m	MPC · JPL
339633	2005 QW_{26}	—	August 27, 2005	Kitt Peak	Spacewatch	NYS	840 m	MPC · JPL
339634	2005 QG_{27}	—	August 27, 2005	Kitt Peak	Spacewatch	·	770 m	MPC · JPL
339635	2005 QR_{28}	—	August 29, 2005	Vicques	M. Ory	·	680 m	MPC · JPL
339636	2005 QU_{30}	—	August 24, 2005	Needville	J. Dellinger, W. G. Dillon	·	860 m	MPC · JPL
339637	2005 QH_{33}	—	August 25, 2005	Palomar	NEAT	·	730 m	MPC · JPL
339638	2005 QE_{36}	—	August 25, 2005	Palomar	NEAT	·	1.3 km	MPC · JPL
339639	2005 QS_{37}	—	August 25, 2005	Palomar	NEAT	·	1.1 km	MPC · JPL
339640	2005 QT_{37}	—	August 25, 2005	Palomar	NEAT	·	700 m	MPC · JPL
339641	2005 QB_{42}	—	August 26, 2005	Anderson Mesa	LONEOS	·	940 m	MPC · JPL
339642	2005 QR_{42}	—	August 26, 2005	Anderson Mesa	LONEOS	·	1.9 km	MPC · JPL
339643	2005 QR_{44}	—	August 26, 2005	Palomar	NEAT	·	1.9 km	MPC · JPL
339644	2005 QK_{48}	—	August 26, 2005	Palomar	NEAT	·	850 m	MPC · JPL
339645	2005 QC_{51}	—	August 26, 2005	Palomar	NEAT	·	1.3 km	MPC · JPL
339646	2005 QG_{51}	—	August 26, 2005	Palomar	NEAT	·	980 m	MPC · JPL
339647	2005 QX_{52}	—	August 27, 2005	Siding Spring	SSS	·	860 m	MPC · JPL
339648	2005 QM_{55}	—	August 28, 2005	Kitt Peak	Spacewatch	·	900 m	MPC · JPL
339649	2005 QH_{56}	—	August 28, 2005	Kitt Peak	Spacewatch	·	810 m	MPC · JPL
339650	2005 QR_{56}	—	August 29, 2005	Vail-Jarnac	Jarnac	·	780 m	MPC · JPL
339651	2005 QR_{60}	—	August 26, 2005	Anderson Mesa	LONEOS	·	1.1 km	MPC · JPL
339652	2005 QA_{67}	—	August 28, 2005	Kitt Peak	Spacewatch	·	730 m	MPC · JPL
339653	2005 QE_{69}	—	August 28, 2005	Siding Spring	SSS	·	970 m	MPC · JPL
339654	2005 QC_{70}	—	August 29, 2005	Socorro	LINEAR	·	820 m	MPC · JPL
339655	2005 QC_{72}	—	August 29, 2005	Anderson Mesa	LONEOS	·	740 m	MPC · JPL
339656	2005 QZ_{72}	—	August 29, 2005	Kitt Peak	Spacewatch	·	930 m	MPC · JPL
339657	2005 QF_{73}	—	August 29, 2005	Socorro	LINEAR	·	1.3 km	MPC · JPL
339658	2005 QC_{74}	—	August 29, 2005	Anderson Mesa	LONEOS	·	1.2 km	MPC · JPL
339659	2005 QO_{81}	—	August 29, 2005	Socorro	LINEAR	·	770 m	MPC · JPL
339660	2005 QR_{81}	—	August 29, 2005	Socorro	LINEAR	·	860 m	MPC · JPL
339661	2005 QN_{82}	—	August 29, 2005	Kitt Peak	Spacewatch	·	840 m	MPC · JPL
339662	2005 QD_{84}	—	August 29, 2005	Anderson Mesa	LONEOS	·	1.1 km	MPC · JPL
339663	2005 QR_{85}	—	August 30, 2005	Socorro	LINEAR	·	1.5 km	MPC · JPL
339664	2005 QG_{87}	—	August 31, 2005	Anderson Mesa	LONEOS	·	4.3 km	MPC · JPL
339665	2005 QO_{92}	—	August 26, 2005	Palomar	NEAT	SYL · CYB	5.3 km	MPC · JPL
339666	2005 QT_{98}	—	August 27, 2005	Palomar	NEAT	·	1.2 km	MPC · JPL
339667	2005 QZ_{98}	—	July 29, 2005	Palomar	NEAT	·	920 m	MPC · JPL
339668	2005 QJ_{106}	—	August 27, 2005	Palomar	NEAT	NYS	1.1 km	MPC · JPL
339669	2005 QB_{114}	—	August 27, 2005	Palomar	NEAT	·	800 m	MPC · JPL
339670	2005 QR_{119}	—	August 28, 2005	Kitt Peak	Spacewatch	·	790 m	MPC · JPL
339671	2005 QC_{124}	—	August 28, 2005	Kitt Peak	Spacewatch	·	650 m	MPC · JPL
339672	2005 QM_{129}	—	August 28, 2005	Kitt Peak	Spacewatch	·	900 m	MPC · JPL
339673	2005 QC_{136}	—	August 28, 2005	Kitt Peak	Spacewatch	·	690 m	MPC · JPL
339674	2005 QT_{140}	—	August 29, 2005	Kitt Peak	Spacewatch	·	740 m	MPC · JPL
339675	2005 QF_{143}	—	August 31, 2005	Anderson Mesa	LONEOS	PHO	1.9 km	MPC · JPL
339676	2005 QX_{143}	—	August 26, 2005	Palomar	NEAT	·	660 m	MPC · JPL
339677	2005 QB_{146}	—	August 28, 2005	Anderson Mesa	LONEOS	·	870 m	MPC · JPL
339678	2005 QR_{146}	—	August 28, 2005	Siding Spring	SSS	·	970 m	MPC · JPL
339679	2005 QY_{150}	—	August 30, 2005	Kitt Peak	Spacewatch	V	710 m	MPC · JPL
339680	2005 QC_{155}	—	August 28, 2005	Siding Spring	SSS	·	850 m	MPC · JPL
339681	2005 QN_{165}	—	August 31, 2005	Palomar	NEAT	·	1.4 km	MPC · JPL
339682	2005 QJ_{167}	—	August 27, 2005	Campo Imperatore	CINEOS	·	930 m	MPC · JPL
339683	2005 QK_{172}	—	August 29, 2005	Palomar	NEAT	·	1.1 km	MPC · JPL
339684	2005 QL_{172}	—	August 29, 2005	Palomar	NEAT	·	950 m	MPC · JPL
339685	2005 QM_{173}	—	August 29, 2005	Palomar	NEAT	·	810 m	MPC · JPL
339686	2005 QQ_{174}	—	August 31, 2005	Kitt Peak	Spacewatch	NYS	900 m	MPC · JPL
339687	2005 QH_{177}	—	August 27, 2005	Kitt Peak	Spacewatch	·	970 m	MPC · JPL
339688	2005 QS_{177}	—	August 30, 2005	Kitt Peak	Spacewatch	·	810 m	MPC · JPL
339689	2005 QH_{179}	—	August 25, 2005	Palomar	NEAT	·	630 m	MPC · JPL
339690	2005 QT_{179}	—	August 26, 2005	Palomar	NEAT	·	850 m	MPC · JPL
339691	2005 QQ_{181}	—	August 30, 2005	Palomar	NEAT	·	980 m	MPC · JPL
339692	2005 QW_{181}	—	August 31, 2005	Kitt Peak	Spacewatch	·	1.0 km	MPC · JPL
339693	2005 QQ_{182}	—	August 31, 2005	Kitt Peak	Spacewatch	·	710 m	MPC · JPL
339694	2005 QU_{186}	—	August 25, 2005	Palomar	NEAT	·	760 m	MPC · JPL
339695	2005 QA_{187}	—	August 28, 2005	Kitt Peak	Spacewatch	·	700 m	MPC · JPL
339696	2005 QY_{188}	—	August 31, 2005	Palomar	NEAT	·	1.0 km	MPC · JPL
339697	2005 RH	—	September 1, 2005	Cordell-Lorenz	D. T. Durig	CYB	4.9 km	MPC · JPL
339698	2005 RD_{2}	—	September 2, 2005	Palomar	NEAT	PHO	1.4 km	MPC · JPL
339699	2005 RX_{4}	—	September 1, 2005	Palomar	NEAT	·	1.2 km	MPC · JPL
339700	2005 RY_{5}	—	September 6, 2005	Anderson Mesa	LONEOS	·	810 m	MPC · JPL

== 339701–339800 ==
back to top

Designation			Discovery			Properties		Ref
Permanent	Provisional	Named after	Date	Site	Discoverer(s)	Category	Diam.	Ref
339701	2005 RM_{6}	—	September 7, 2005	Altschwendt	Altschwendt	·	890 m	MPC · JPL
339702	2005 RZ_{9}	—	September 3, 2005	Palomar	NEAT	PHO	1.6 km	MPC · JPL
339703	2005 RU_{10}	—	September 8, 2005	Siding Spring	SSS	·	1.2 km	MPC · JPL
339704	2005 RH_{11}	—	September 10, 2005	Anderson Mesa	LONEOS	(2076)	1.2 km	MPC · JPL
339705	2005 RB_{22}	—	September 6, 2005	Siding Spring	SSS	·	1.0 km	MPC · JPL
339706	2005 RZ_{25}	—	September 10, 2005	Anderson Mesa	LONEOS	V	920 m	MPC · JPL
339707	2005 RK_{27}	—	September 10, 2005	Anderson Mesa	LONEOS	PHO	1.5 km	MPC · JPL
339708	2005 RH_{29}	—	September 11, 2005	Socorro	LINEAR	·	760 m	MPC · JPL
339709	2005 RZ_{32}	—	September 8, 2005	Socorro	LINEAR	·	910 m	MPC · JPL
339710	2005 RH_{41}	—	September 13, 2005	Kitt Peak	Spacewatch	·	910 m	MPC · JPL
339711	2005 RA_{43}	—	September 14, 2005	Catalina	CSS	·	740 m	MPC · JPL
339712	2005 SE	—	September 16, 2005	Mayhill	Hutsebaut, R.	·	1.1 km	MPC · JPL
339713	2005 SG_{1}	—	September 22, 2005	Palomar	NEAT	·	940 m	MPC · JPL
339714	2005 ST_{1}	—	September 24, 2005	Catalina	CSS	APO	300 m	MPC · JPL
339715	2005 SS_{4}	—	September 24, 2005	Catalina	CSS	APO	570 m	MPC · JPL
339716	2005 SL_{5}	—	September 23, 2005	Catalina	CSS	·	800 m	MPC · JPL
339717	2005 SG_{7}	—	September 24, 2005	Kitt Peak	Spacewatch	·	750 m	MPC · JPL
339718	2005 SP_{8}	—	September 25, 2005	Kitt Peak	Spacewatch	(2076)	910 m	MPC · JPL
339719	2005 SJ_{9}	—	September 25, 2005	Goodricke-Pigott	R. A. Tucker	PHO	3.4 km	MPC · JPL
339720	2005 SF_{12}	—	September 23, 2005	Catalina	CSS	·	880 m	MPC · JPL
339721	2005 SO_{13}	—	September 24, 2005	Kitt Peak	Spacewatch	·	800 m	MPC · JPL
339722	2005 SB_{14}	—	September 24, 2005	Kitt Peak	Spacewatch	·	1.6 km	MPC · JPL
339723	2005 SA_{23}	—	September 23, 2005	Kitt Peak	Spacewatch	·	740 m	MPC · JPL
339724	2005 SO_{28}	—	September 23, 2005	Kitt Peak	Spacewatch	·	970 m	MPC · JPL
339725	2005 SK_{33}	—	September 23, 2005	Kitt Peak	Spacewatch	V	790 m	MPC · JPL
339726	2005 SL_{34}	—	September 23, 2005	Kitt Peak	Spacewatch	·	710 m	MPC · JPL
339727	2005 SF_{37}	—	September 24, 2005	Kitt Peak	Spacewatch	SYL · CYB	5.1 km	MPC · JPL
339728	2005 SE_{39}	—	September 24, 2005	Kitt Peak	Spacewatch	·	820 m	MPC · JPL
339729	2005 SJ_{39}	—	September 24, 2005	Kitt Peak	Spacewatch	·	900 m	MPC · JPL
339730	2005 SS_{41}	—	September 24, 2005	Kitt Peak	Spacewatch	·	760 m	MPC · JPL
339731	2005 SG_{43}	—	September 24, 2005	Kitt Peak	Spacewatch	·	810 m	MPC · JPL
339732	2005 SK_{44}	—	September 24, 2005	Kitt Peak	Spacewatch	·	970 m	MPC · JPL
339733	2005 SL_{44}	—	September 24, 2005	Kitt Peak	Spacewatch	·	760 m	MPC · JPL
339734	2005 SR_{44}	—	September 24, 2005	Kitt Peak	Spacewatch	NYS	1.1 km	MPC · JPL
339735	2005 SE_{46}	—	September 24, 2005	Kitt Peak	Spacewatch	·	1.2 km	MPC · JPL
339736	2005 SS_{47}	—	September 24, 2005	Kitt Peak	Spacewatch	·	1.2 km	MPC · JPL
339737	2005 SP_{48}	—	September 24, 2005	Kitt Peak	Spacewatch	·	1 km	MPC · JPL
339738	2005 SF_{49}	—	September 24, 2005	Kitt Peak	Spacewatch	NYS	1.1 km	MPC · JPL
339739	2005 SU_{50}	—	September 24, 2005	Kitt Peak	Spacewatch	·	620 m	MPC · JPL
339740	2005 SZ_{50}	—	September 24, 2005	Kitt Peak	Spacewatch	·	1.2 km	MPC · JPL
339741	2005 SE_{51}	—	September 24, 2005	Kitt Peak	Spacewatch	V	980 m	MPC · JPL
339742	2005 SU_{52}	—	September 25, 2005	Kitt Peak	Spacewatch	·	920 m	MPC · JPL
339743	2005 SS_{55}	—	September 25, 2005	Kitt Peak	Spacewatch	·	1.2 km	MPC · JPL
339744	2005 SF_{56}	—	September 25, 2005	Kitt Peak	Spacewatch	NYS	1.1 km	MPC · JPL
339745	2005 SG_{56}	—	September 25, 2005	Kitt Peak	Spacewatch	·	770 m	MPC · JPL
339746	2005 SA_{57}	—	September 26, 2005	Kitt Peak	Spacewatch	·	770 m	MPC · JPL
339747	2005 SO_{58}	—	September 26, 2005	Kitt Peak	Spacewatch	V	620 m	MPC · JPL
339748	2005 SA_{60}	—	September 26, 2005	Kitt Peak	Spacewatch	·	1.4 km	MPC · JPL
339749	2005 SH_{62}	—	July 2, 2005	Kitt Peak	Spacewatch	·	870 m	MPC · JPL
339750	2005 SH_{64}	—	September 26, 2005	Kitt Peak	Spacewatch	·	1.2 km	MPC · JPL
339751	2005 SB_{66}	—	September 26, 2005	Kitt Peak	Spacewatch	·	1.0 km	MPC · JPL
339752	2005 SK_{66}	—	September 26, 2005	Palomar	NEAT	·	820 m	MPC · JPL
339753	2005 SC_{68}	—	September 27, 2005	Kitt Peak	Spacewatch	·	710 m	MPC · JPL
339754	2005 SQ_{68}	—	September 27, 2005	Kitt Peak	Spacewatch	·	870 m	MPC · JPL
339755	2005 SH_{73}	—	September 23, 2005	Kitt Peak	Spacewatch	·	890 m	MPC · JPL
339756	2005 SQ_{73}	—	September 23, 2005	Kitt Peak	Spacewatch	·	890 m	MPC · JPL
339757	2005 SP_{76}	—	September 24, 2005	Kitt Peak	Spacewatch	·	830 m	MPC · JPL
339758	2005 SJ_{78}	—	September 24, 2005	Kitt Peak	Spacewatch	·	830 m	MPC · JPL
339759	2005 SU_{78}	—	September 24, 2005	Kitt Peak	Spacewatch	·	750 m	MPC · JPL
339760	2005 SD_{81}	—	September 24, 2005	Kitt Peak	Spacewatch	·	940 m	MPC · JPL
339761	2005 SB_{82}	—	September 24, 2005	Kitt Peak	Spacewatch	·	570 m	MPC · JPL
339762	2005 SO_{85}	—	September 24, 2005	Kitt Peak	Spacewatch	·	850 m	MPC · JPL
339763	2005 SF_{95}	—	September 25, 2005	Kitt Peak	Spacewatch	CYB	4.5 km	MPC · JPL
339764	2005 SU_{96}	—	September 25, 2005	Palomar	NEAT	·	990 m	MPC · JPL
339765	2005 SO_{97}	—	September 25, 2005	Palomar	NEAT	·	1.1 km	MPC · JPL
339766	2005 SZ_{98}	—	September 25, 2005	Kitt Peak	Spacewatch	·	1.0 km	MPC · JPL
339767	2005 SE_{99}	—	September 25, 2005	Kitt Peak	Spacewatch	·	970 m	MPC · JPL
339768	2005 SA_{105}	—	September 25, 2005	Palomar	NEAT	·	990 m	MPC · JPL
339769	2005 SP_{106}	—	September 26, 2005	Kitt Peak	Spacewatch	(2076)	940 m	MPC · JPL
339770	2005 SQ_{111}	—	September 26, 2005	Kitt Peak	Spacewatch	·	980 m	MPC · JPL
339771	2005 SL_{112}	—	September 26, 2005	Palomar	NEAT	V	820 m	MPC · JPL
339772	2005 SS_{114}	—	September 27, 2005	Kitt Peak	Spacewatch	·	1.4 km	MPC · JPL
339773	2005 SB_{115}	—	September 27, 2005	Kitt Peak	Spacewatch	·	800 m	MPC · JPL
339774	2005 SS_{115}	—	September 27, 2005	Kitt Peak	Spacewatch	·	920 m	MPC · JPL
339775	2005 SR_{118}	—	September 28, 2005	Palomar	NEAT	V	850 m	MPC · JPL
339776	2005 SX_{119}	—	September 29, 2005	Kitt Peak	Spacewatch	·	790 m	MPC · JPL
339777	2005 SH_{121}	—	September 29, 2005	Kitt Peak	Spacewatch	·	980 m	MPC · JPL
339778	2005 SH_{123}	—	September 29, 2005	Anderson Mesa	LONEOS	·	1.3 km	MPC · JPL
339779	2005 SK_{129}	—	September 29, 2005	Mount Lemmon	Mount Lemmon Survey	·	1.1 km	MPC · JPL
339780	2005 SH_{133}	—	September 29, 2005	Kitt Peak	Spacewatch	·	1.6 km	MPC · JPL
339781	2005 SY_{133}	—	September 30, 2005	Kitt Peak	Spacewatch	PHO	1.1 km	MPC · JPL
339782	2005 SV_{135}	—	September 24, 2005	Kitt Peak	Spacewatch	·	2.1 km	MPC · JPL
339783	2005 SV_{137}	—	September 24, 2005	Kitt Peak	Spacewatch	V	790 m	MPC · JPL
339784	2005 SQ_{147}	—	September 25, 2005	Kitt Peak	Spacewatch	·	1.1 km	MPC · JPL
339785	2005 SY_{147}	—	September 25, 2005	Kitt Peak	Spacewatch	PHO	1.0 km	MPC · JPL
339786	2005 SR_{148}	—	September 25, 2005	Kitt Peak	Spacewatch	·	1.3 km	MPC · JPL
339787	2005 SH_{152}	—	September 25, 2005	Kitt Peak	Spacewatch	·	1.0 km	MPC · JPL
339788	2005 SJ_{153}	—	September 25, 2005	Kitt Peak	Spacewatch	·	960 m	MPC · JPL
339789	2005 SZ_{154}	—	September 26, 2005	Kitt Peak	Spacewatch	·	730 m	MPC · JPL
339790	2005 SE_{163}	—	September 27, 2005	Kitt Peak	Spacewatch	·	800 m	MPC · JPL
339791	2005 SX_{168}	—	September 29, 2005	Kitt Peak	Spacewatch	·	1.2 km	MPC · JPL
339792	2005 SK_{178}	—	September 29, 2005	Palomar	NEAT	·	1.4 km	MPC · JPL
339793	2005 SF_{179}	—	September 29, 2005	Anderson Mesa	LONEOS	·	740 m	MPC · JPL
339794	2005 SE_{184}	—	September 29, 2005	Kitt Peak	Spacewatch	·	840 m	MPC · JPL
339795	2005 SS_{184}	—	September 29, 2005	Kitt Peak	Spacewatch	·	1.0 km	MPC · JPL
339796	2005 SJ_{186}	—	September 29, 2005	Mount Lemmon	Mount Lemmon Survey	·	1.0 km	MPC · JPL
339797	2005 SZ_{188}	—	September 29, 2005	Mount Lemmon	Mount Lemmon Survey	·	800 m	MPC · JPL
339798	2005 SB_{190}	—	September 29, 2005	Kitt Peak	Spacewatch	·	1.0 km	MPC · JPL
339799	2005 SF_{192}	—	September 29, 2005	Mount Lemmon	Mount Lemmon Survey	V	940 m	MPC · JPL
339800	2005 SY_{192}	—	September 29, 2005	Kitt Peak	Spacewatch	·	1.1 km	MPC · JPL

== 339801–339900 ==
back to top

Designation			Discovery			Properties		Ref
Permanent	Provisional	Named after	Date	Site	Discoverer(s)	Category	Diam.	Ref
339801	2005 SP_{193}	—	September 29, 2005	Kitt Peak	Spacewatch	·	1.9 km	MPC · JPL
339802	2005 SF_{201}	—	September 30, 2005	Kitt Peak	Spacewatch	V	570 m	MPC · JPL
339803	2005 SV_{201}	—	August 25, 2005	Palomar	NEAT	·	910 m	MPC · JPL
339804	2005 SM_{203}	—	September 9, 2005	Socorro	LINEAR	V	850 m	MPC · JPL
339805	2005 SH_{205}	—	September 30, 2005	Palomar	NEAT	·	950 m	MPC · JPL
339806	2005 SR_{205}	—	September 30, 2005	Palomar	NEAT	·	920 m	MPC · JPL
339807	2005 SW_{205}	—	September 30, 2005	Anderson Mesa	LONEOS	·	1.2 km	MPC · JPL
339808	2005 SQ_{207}	—	September 30, 2005	Kitt Peak	Spacewatch	·	1.2 km	MPC · JPL
339809	2005 SJ_{209}	—	September 30, 2005	Socorro	LINEAR	·	1.2 km	MPC · JPL
339810	2005 SJ_{215}	—	September 30, 2005	Catalina	CSS	·	1.0 km	MPC · JPL
339811	2005 SN_{215}	—	September 30, 2005	Catalina	CSS	·	1.4 km	MPC · JPL
339812	2005 SC_{216}	—	September 30, 2005	Anderson Mesa	LONEOS	V	760 m	MPC · JPL
339813	2005 SF_{219}	—	September 30, 2005	Palomar	NEAT	·	4.2 km	MPC · JPL
339814	2005 SA_{224}	—	September 29, 2005	Mount Lemmon	Mount Lemmon Survey	MAS	740 m	MPC · JPL
339815	2005 SX_{224}	—	September 23, 2005	Kitt Peak	Spacewatch	·	720 m	MPC · JPL
339816	2005 SD_{227}	—	September 30, 2005	Kitt Peak	Spacewatch	·	760 m	MPC · JPL
339817	2005 SW_{231}	—	September 30, 2005	Mount Lemmon	Mount Lemmon Survey	NYS	920 m	MPC · JPL
339818	2005 SK_{232}	—	September 30, 2005	Mount Lemmon	Mount Lemmon Survey	MAS	820 m	MPC · JPL
339819	2005 SW_{232}	—	September 30, 2005	Mount Lemmon	Mount Lemmon Survey	NYS	950 m	MPC · JPL
339820	2005 SM_{233}	—	September 30, 2005	Mount Lemmon	Mount Lemmon Survey	MAS	670 m	MPC · JPL
339821	2005 SU_{236}	—	September 29, 2005	Kitt Peak	Spacewatch	·	840 m	MPC · JPL
339822	2005 SM_{238}	—	September 29, 2005	Kitt Peak	Spacewatch	NYS	910 m	MPC · JPL
339823	2005 SV_{241}	—	September 30, 2005	Kitt Peak	Spacewatch	·	780 m	MPC · JPL
339824	2005 SV_{244}	—	September 30, 2005	Mount Lemmon	Mount Lemmon Survey	MAS	850 m	MPC · JPL
339825	2005 SF_{248}	—	September 26, 2005	Kitt Peak	Spacewatch	·	1.1 km	MPC · JPL
339826	2005 SN_{249}	—	September 23, 2005	Kitt Peak	Spacewatch	·	720 m	MPC · JPL
339827	2005 SA_{254}	—	June 18, 2005	Mount Lemmon	Mount Lemmon Survey	·	710 m	MPC · JPL
339828	2005 SC_{254}	—	September 22, 2005	Palomar	NEAT	·	720 m	MPC · JPL
339829	2005 SB_{257}	—	September 22, 2005	Palomar	NEAT	·	890 m	MPC · JPL
339830	2005 SS_{259}	—	September 25, 2005	Goodricke-Pigott	R. A. Tucker	(2076)	1.1 km	MPC · JPL
339831	2005 SN_{266}	—	September 29, 2005	Anderson Mesa	LONEOS	·	860 m	MPC · JPL
339832	2005 SA_{279}	—	September 26, 2005	Kitt Peak	Spacewatch	·	1.5 km	MPC · JPL
339833	2005 SH_{280}	—	September 25, 2005	Kitt Peak	Spacewatch	·	1.2 km	MPC · JPL
339834	2005 SQ_{282}	—	September 21, 2005	Apache Point	A. C. Becker	SYL · CYB	4.2 km	MPC · JPL
339835	2005 SK_{289}	—	September 23, 2005	Kitt Peak	Spacewatch	·	1.2 km	MPC · JPL
339836	2005 SL_{289}	—	September 23, 2005	Kitt Peak	Spacewatch	·	1.6 km	MPC · JPL
339837	2005 SO_{289}	—	September 27, 2005	Kitt Peak	Spacewatch	·	1.9 km	MPC · JPL
339838	2005 SL_{290}	—	September 30, 2005	Kitt Peak	Spacewatch	·	1.1 km	MPC · JPL
339839	2005 TU	—	October 1, 2005	Kitt Peak	Spacewatch	·	830 m	MPC · JPL
339840	2005 TQ_{1}	—	October 1, 2005	Catalina	CSS	·	1.4 km	MPC · JPL
339841	2005 TR_{1}	—	October 1, 2005	Catalina	CSS	·	900 m	MPC · JPL
339842	2005 TG_{12}	—	September 23, 2005	Kitt Peak	Spacewatch	·	1.1 km	MPC · JPL
339843	2005 TR_{12}	—	October 1, 2005	Anderson Mesa	LONEOS	·	1.2 km	MPC · JPL
339844	2005 TN_{13}	—	September 13, 2005	Socorro	LINEAR	·	1.7 km	MPC · JPL
339845	2005 TH_{17}	—	August 31, 2005	Palomar	NEAT	·	710 m	MPC · JPL
339846	2005 TL_{18}	—	October 1, 2005	Socorro	LINEAR	NYS	1.1 km	MPC · JPL
339847	2005 TK_{23}	—	October 1, 2005	Socorro	LINEAR	·	1.3 km	MPC · JPL
339848	2005 TP_{25}	—	October 1, 2005	Mount Lemmon	Mount Lemmon Survey	·	830 m	MPC · JPL
339849	2005 TU_{26}	—	October 1, 2005	Mount Lemmon	Mount Lemmon Survey	·	1.1 km	MPC · JPL
339850	2005 TA_{28}	—	October 1, 2005	Kitt Peak	Spacewatch	V	980 m	MPC · JPL
339851	2005 TX_{33}	—	October 1, 2005	Kitt Peak	Spacewatch	·	1.0 km	MPC · JPL
339852	2005 TN_{41}	—	October 3, 2005	Kitt Peak	Spacewatch	·	900 m	MPC · JPL
339853	2005 TL_{46}	—	October 1, 2005	Catalina	CSS	·	1.1 km	MPC · JPL
339854	2005 TW_{46}	—	October 3, 2005	Catalina	CSS	·	1.1 km	MPC · JPL
339855 Kėdainiai	2005 TC_{49}	Kėdainiai	October 7, 2005	Moletai	K. Černis, J. Zdanavicius	·	1.5 km	MPC · JPL
339856	2005 TW_{55}	—	October 6, 2005	Catalina	CSS	·	780 m	MPC · JPL
339857	2005 TL_{59}	—	October 1, 2005	Kitt Peak	Spacewatch	NYS	1.3 km	MPC · JPL
339858	2005 TW_{61}	—	October 4, 2005	Mount Lemmon	Mount Lemmon Survey	V	1.8 km	MPC · JPL
339859	2005 TJ_{62}	—	October 4, 2005	Mount Lemmon	Mount Lemmon Survey	·	1.4 km	MPC · JPL
339860	2005 TX_{65}	—	October 2, 2005	Palomar	NEAT	·	910 m	MPC · JPL
339861	2005 TJ_{68}	—	October 5, 2005	Kitt Peak	Spacewatch	·	910 m	MPC · JPL
339862	2005 TX_{70}	—	October 6, 2005	Mount Lemmon	Mount Lemmon Survey	V	730 m	MPC · JPL
339863	2005 TB_{74}	—	October 7, 2005	Anderson Mesa	LONEOS	·	1.1 km	MPC · JPL
339864	2005 TG_{80}	—	October 3, 2005	Kitt Peak	Spacewatch	V	810 m	MPC · JPL
339865	2005 TV_{94}	—	October 6, 2005	Anderson Mesa	LONEOS	·	1.0 km	MPC · JPL
339866	2005 TH_{96}	—	September 29, 2005	Kitt Peak	Spacewatch	·	770 m	MPC · JPL
339867	2005 TG_{98}	—	October 6, 2005	Kitt Peak	Spacewatch	·	930 m	MPC · JPL
339868	2005 TN_{98}	—	October 6, 2005	Anderson Mesa	LONEOS	PHO	3.4 km	MPC · JPL
339869	2005 TQ_{100}	—	October 7, 2005	Socorro	LINEAR	·	1.0 km	MPC · JPL
339870	2005 TR_{100}	—	October 7, 2005	Kitt Peak	Spacewatch	·	860 m	MPC · JPL
339871	2005 TJ_{101}	—	October 7, 2005	Catalina	CSS	·	910 m	MPC · JPL
339872	2005 TG_{102}	—	October 7, 2005	Mount Lemmon	Mount Lemmon Survey	·	920 m	MPC · JPL
339873	2005 TZ_{103}	—	September 30, 2005	Catalina	CSS	·	940 m	MPC · JPL
339874	2005 TS_{106}	—	October 4, 2005	Mount Lemmon	Mount Lemmon Survey	·	1.0 km	MPC · JPL
339875	2005 TE_{107}	—	October 4, 2005	Mount Lemmon	Mount Lemmon Survey	·	1.2 km	MPC · JPL
339876	2005 TU_{112}	—	October 7, 2005	Kitt Peak	Spacewatch	·	1.6 km	MPC · JPL
339877	2005 TT_{114}	—	October 7, 2005	Kitt Peak	Spacewatch	·	860 m	MPC · JPL
339878	2005 TL_{121}	—	October 7, 2005	Catalina	CSS	·	1.5 km	MPC · JPL
339879	2005 TP_{122}	—	October 7, 2005	Kitt Peak	Spacewatch	·	790 m	MPC · JPL
339880	2005 TA_{124}	—	October 16, 1998	Kitt Peak	Spacewatch	NYS	610 m	MPC · JPL
339881	2005 TR_{127}	—	October 7, 2005	Kitt Peak	Spacewatch	·	680 m	MPC · JPL
339882	2005 TE_{128}	—	October 7, 2005	Kitt Peak	Spacewatch	·	950 m	MPC · JPL
339883	2005 TM_{129}	—	October 7, 2005	Kitt Peak	Spacewatch	·	1.1 km	MPC · JPL
339884	2005 TJ_{130}	—	October 7, 2005	Kitt Peak	Spacewatch	·	1.1 km	MPC · JPL
339885	2005 TA_{133}	—	October 7, 2005	Kitt Peak	Spacewatch	3:2 · SHU	6.8 km	MPC · JPL
339886	2005 TL_{134}	—	September 25, 2005	Kitt Peak	Spacewatch	·	810 m	MPC · JPL
339887	2005 TR_{134}	—	October 10, 2005	Kitt Peak	Spacewatch	·	1.1 km	MPC · JPL
339888	2005 TT_{135}	—	October 6, 2005	Kitt Peak	Spacewatch	·	1.1 km	MPC · JPL
339889	2005 TR_{137}	—	October 6, 2005	Kitt Peak	Spacewatch	·	1.1 km	MPC · JPL
339890	2005 TG_{146}	—	October 8, 2005	Kitt Peak	Spacewatch	PHO	2.2 km	MPC · JPL
339891	2005 TB_{150}	—	October 8, 2005	Kitt Peak	Spacewatch	V	590 m	MPC · JPL
339892	2005 TZ_{151}	—	October 10, 2005	Kitt Peak	Spacewatch	NYS	1.1 km	MPC · JPL
339893	2005 TW_{157}	—	October 9, 2005	Kitt Peak	Spacewatch	·	710 m	MPC · JPL
339894	2005 TH_{165}	—	October 9, 2005	Kitt Peak	Spacewatch	·	1.1 km	MPC · JPL
339895	2005 TP_{165}	—	October 9, 2005	Kitt Peak	Spacewatch	·	680 m	MPC · JPL
339896	2005 TL_{169}	—	October 9, 2005	Kitt Peak	Spacewatch	NYS	1.1 km	MPC · JPL
339897	2005 TZ_{172}	—	October 13, 2005	Socorro	LINEAR	·	1.2 km	MPC · JPL
339898	2005 TY_{175}	—	September 23, 2005	Kitt Peak	Spacewatch	ERI	1.2 km	MPC · JPL
339899	2005 TX_{182}	—	September 26, 2005	Palomar	NEAT	·	1.2 km	MPC · JPL
339900	2005 TW_{183}	—	October 9, 2005	Catalina	CSS	V	840 m	MPC · JPL

== 339901–340000 ==
back to top

Designation			Discovery			Properties		Ref
Permanent	Provisional	Named after	Date	Site	Discoverer(s)	Category	Diam.	Ref
339901	2005 TB_{192}	—	October 5, 2005	Kitt Peak	Spacewatch	·	800 m	MPC · JPL
339902	2005 UT_{4}	—	September 29, 2005	Kitt Peak	Spacewatch	·	750 m	MPC · JPL
339903	2005 UD_{5}	—	October 27, 2005	Mount Graham	Ryan, W. H.	·	1.7 km	MPC · JPL
339904	2005 UO_{11}	—	October 22, 2005	Kitt Peak	Spacewatch	·	1.0 km	MPC · JPL
339905	2005 UC_{13}	—	October 22, 2005	Kitt Peak	Spacewatch	·	1.0 km	MPC · JPL
339906	2005 UQ_{19}	—	October 22, 2005	Kitt Peak	Spacewatch	V	720 m	MPC · JPL
339907	2005 UJ_{20}	—	October 22, 2005	Catalina	CSS	V	860 m	MPC · JPL
339908	2005 UL_{20}	—	October 22, 2005	Catalina	CSS	·	1.1 km	MPC · JPL
339909	2005 UJ_{26}	—	October 23, 2005	Kitt Peak	Spacewatch	·	1.3 km	MPC · JPL
339910	2005 UV_{29}	—	October 23, 2005	Catalina	CSS	NYS	990 m	MPC · JPL
339911	2005 UU_{31}	—	October 24, 2005	Kitt Peak	Spacewatch	·	920 m	MPC · JPL
339912	2005 UC_{34}	—	October 24, 2005	Kitt Peak	Spacewatch	·	1.3 km	MPC · JPL
339913	2005 UF_{34}	—	October 24, 2005	Kitt Peak	Spacewatch	·	1.2 km	MPC · JPL
339914	2005 UF_{36}	—	October 24, 2005	Kitt Peak	Spacewatch	·	1.1 km	MPC · JPL
339915	2005 UX_{36}	—	October 24, 2005	Kitt Peak	Spacewatch	·	1.1 km	MPC · JPL
339916	2005 UB_{38}	—	October 24, 2005	Kitt Peak	Spacewatch	·	1.3 km	MPC · JPL
339917	2005 UB_{42}	—	October 21, 2005	Palomar	NEAT	V	770 m	MPC · JPL
339918	2005 UQ_{42}	—	October 22, 2005	Kitt Peak	Spacewatch	NYS	1.2 km	MPC · JPL
339919	2005 UN_{44}	—	October 22, 2005	Kitt Peak	Spacewatch	·	840 m	MPC · JPL
339920	2005 UR_{45}	—	October 22, 2005	Catalina	CSS	·	1.6 km	MPC · JPL
339921	2005 UZ_{45}	—	October 22, 2005	Catalina	CSS	·	830 m	MPC · JPL
339922	2005 UF_{46}	—	October 22, 2005	Kitt Peak	Spacewatch	NYS	860 m	MPC · JPL
339923	2005 US_{47}	—	October 22, 2005	Catalina	CSS	·	1.1 km	MPC · JPL
339924	2005 UA_{49}	—	October 23, 2005	Catalina	CSS	V	690 m	MPC · JPL
339925	2005 UK_{49}	—	October 23, 2005	Catalina	CSS	·	1.6 km	MPC · JPL
339926	2005 US_{49}	—	October 23, 2005	Palomar	NEAT	V	960 m	MPC · JPL
339927	2005 UF_{50}	—	October 23, 2005	Catalina	CSS	·	1.2 km	MPC · JPL
339928	2005 UT_{51}	—	October 23, 2005	Catalina	CSS	·	2.0 km	MPC · JPL
339929	2005 UC_{52}	—	October 23, 2005	Catalina	CSS	V	1.0 km	MPC · JPL
339930	2005 UZ_{55}	—	October 23, 2005	Catalina	CSS	·	980 m	MPC · JPL
339931	2005 UA_{62}	—	October 25, 2005	Mount Lemmon	Mount Lemmon Survey	(2076)	950 m	MPC · JPL
339932	2005 UY_{63}	—	October 25, 2005	Mount Lemmon	Mount Lemmon Survey	MAS	770 m	MPC · JPL
339933	2005 UK_{66}	—	October 22, 2005	Kitt Peak	Spacewatch	V	760 m	MPC · JPL
339934	2005 UV_{67}	—	October 22, 2005	Palomar	NEAT	·	870 m	MPC · JPL
339935	2005 UU_{71}	—	October 23, 2005	Catalina	CSS	·	980 m	MPC · JPL
339936	2005 UY_{85}	—	October 22, 2005	Kitt Peak	Spacewatch	·	930 m	MPC · JPL
339937	2005 US_{88}	—	October 22, 2005	Kitt Peak	Spacewatch	NYS	880 m	MPC · JPL
339938	2005 UJ_{93}	—	October 22, 2005	Kitt Peak	Spacewatch	V	830 m	MPC · JPL
339939	2005 UY_{94}	—	October 22, 2005	Kitt Peak	Spacewatch	·	1.6 km	MPC · JPL
339940	2005 UM_{99}	—	October 22, 2005	Kitt Peak	Spacewatch	·	1.4 km	MPC · JPL
339941	2005 UH_{105}	—	October 22, 2005	Kitt Peak	Spacewatch	·	1.2 km	MPC · JPL
339942	2005 UD_{106}	—	October 22, 2005	Kitt Peak	Spacewatch	·	1.3 km	MPC · JPL
339943	2005 UX_{110}	—	October 22, 2005	Kitt Peak	Spacewatch	·	2.2 km	MPC · JPL
339944	2005 UV_{116}	—	October 23, 2005	Catalina	CSS	·	1.5 km	MPC · JPL
339945	2005 UE_{118}	—	October 24, 2005	Kitt Peak	Spacewatch	V	720 m	MPC · JPL
339946	2005 UZ_{122}	—	October 24, 2005	Kitt Peak	Spacewatch	·	940 m	MPC · JPL
339947	2005 UZ_{124}	—	October 24, 2005	Kitt Peak	Spacewatch	·	880 m	MPC · JPL
339948	2005 UO_{125}	—	October 24, 2005	Kitt Peak	Spacewatch	·	1.4 km	MPC · JPL
339949	2005 UB_{131}	—	October 24, 2005	Kitt Peak	Spacewatch	·	900 m	MPC · JPL
339950	2005 UH_{140}	—	October 25, 2005	Mount Lemmon	Mount Lemmon Survey	3:2	5.5 km	MPC · JPL
339951	2005 UF_{141}	—	October 25, 2005	Catalina	CSS	·	1.1 km	MPC · JPL
339952	2005 UP_{141}	—	October 25, 2005	Catalina	CSS	·	1.5 km	MPC · JPL
339953	2005 UA_{145}	—	October 26, 2005	Kitt Peak	Spacewatch	·	920 m	MPC · JPL
339954	2005 UX_{151}	—	October 26, 2005	Kitt Peak	Spacewatch	·	1.1 km	MPC · JPL
339955	2005 UF_{157}	—	October 25, 2005	Kitt Peak	Spacewatch	·	1.2 km	MPC · JPL
339956	2005 UX_{160}	—	October 22, 2005	Catalina	CSS	·	1.1 km	MPC · JPL
339957	2005 UH_{162}	—	October 27, 2005	Anderson Mesa	LONEOS	·	1.2 km	MPC · JPL
339958	2005 UY_{162}	—	October 23, 2005	Kitt Peak	Spacewatch	·	1.5 km	MPC · JPL
339959	2005 UP_{170}	—	October 24, 2005	Kitt Peak	Spacewatch	·	1.2 km	MPC · JPL
339960	2005 UB_{173}	—	October 24, 2005	Kitt Peak	Spacewatch	·	1.1 km	MPC · JPL
339961	2005 UO_{177}	—	October 24, 2005	Kitt Peak	Spacewatch	·	710 m	MPC · JPL
339962	2005 UN_{178}	—	October 24, 2005	Kitt Peak	Spacewatch	V	720 m	MPC · JPL
339963	2005 UP_{178}	—	October 24, 2005	Kitt Peak	Spacewatch	·	820 m	MPC · JPL
339964	2005 UA_{184}	—	October 25, 2005	Mount Lemmon	Mount Lemmon Survey	·	1.0 km	MPC · JPL
339965	2005 UO_{187}	—	August 30, 2005	Palomar	NEAT	·	720 m	MPC · JPL
339966	2005 UF_{188}	—	October 27, 2005	Mount Lemmon	Mount Lemmon Survey	MAS	750 m	MPC · JPL
339967	2005 UW_{194}	—	October 22, 2005	Kitt Peak	Spacewatch	·	1.2 km	MPC · JPL
339968	2005 UZ_{199}	—	October 25, 2005	Kitt Peak	Spacewatch	·	1.4 km	MPC · JPL
339969	2005 US_{208}	—	October 27, 2005	Kitt Peak	Spacewatch	·	560 m	MPC · JPL
339970	2005 UM_{210}	—	October 27, 2005	Mount Lemmon	Mount Lemmon Survey	·	1.1 km	MPC · JPL
339971	2005 UD_{214}	—	October 24, 2005	Palomar	NEAT	·	1.3 km	MPC · JPL
339972	2005 UU_{214}	—	October 27, 2005	Palomar	NEAT	·	870 m	MPC · JPL
339973	2005 UC_{217}	—	October 27, 2005	Socorro	LINEAR	·	1.1 km	MPC · JPL
339974	2005 UK_{218}	—	October 25, 2005	Kitt Peak	Spacewatch	·	1.1 km	MPC · JPL
339975	2005 UM_{218}	—	October 25, 2005	Kitt Peak	Spacewatch	·	1.1 km	MPC · JPL
339976	2005 UD_{224}	—	October 25, 2005	Kitt Peak	Spacewatch	·	850 m	MPC · JPL
339977	2005 UR_{226}	—	October 25, 2005	Kitt Peak	Spacewatch	·	1.4 km	MPC · JPL
339978	2005 UC_{229}	—	October 25, 2005	Kitt Peak	Spacewatch	·	1.1 km	MPC · JPL
339979	2005 UY_{229}	—	October 25, 2005	Kitt Peak	Spacewatch	·	1.4 km	MPC · JPL
339980	2005 UY_{230}	—	October 25, 2005	Mount Lemmon	Mount Lemmon Survey	V	720 m	MPC · JPL
339981	2005 UH_{243}	—	October 25, 2005	Kitt Peak	Spacewatch	·	1.0 km	MPC · JPL
339982	2005 US_{244}	—	October 25, 2005	Kitt Peak	Spacewatch	·	1.4 km	MPC · JPL
339983	2005 UY_{244}	—	October 25, 2005	Kitt Peak	Spacewatch	V	700 m	MPC · JPL
339984	2005 UR_{248}	—	October 28, 2005	Mount Lemmon	Mount Lemmon Survey	·	1.8 km	MPC · JPL
339985	2005 UQ_{249}	—	October 28, 2005	Mount Lemmon	Mount Lemmon Survey	MAS	820 m	MPC · JPL
339986	2005 UE_{251}	—	October 23, 2005	Catalina	CSS	·	1.1 km	MPC · JPL
339987	2005 UT_{256}	—	October 25, 2005	Mount Lemmon	Mount Lemmon Survey	·	820 m	MPC · JPL
339988	2005 UD_{259}	—	October 25, 2005	Kitt Peak	Spacewatch	·	980 m	MPC · JPL
339989	2005 UF_{259}	—	October 25, 2005	Kitt Peak	Spacewatch	·	1.1 km	MPC · JPL
339990	2005 UR_{261}	—	October 26, 2005	Kitt Peak	Spacewatch	·	750 m	MPC · JPL
339991	2005 UG_{262}	—	October 26, 2005	Kitt Peak	Spacewatch	·	1.1 km	MPC · JPL
339992	2005 UN_{262}	—	October 26, 2005	Kitt Peak	Spacewatch	NYS	950 m	MPC · JPL
339993	2005 UQ_{275}	—	October 29, 2005	Catalina	CSS	·	1.4 km	MPC · JPL
339994	2005 UT_{278}	—	October 24, 2005	Kitt Peak	Spacewatch	·	980 m	MPC · JPL
339995	2005 UX_{278}	—	October 24, 2005	Kitt Peak	Spacewatch	·	1.2 km	MPC · JPL
339996	2005 UT_{282}	—	October 26, 2005	Kitt Peak	Spacewatch	·	910 m	MPC · JPL
339997	2005 UD_{286}	—	October 26, 2005	Kitt Peak	Spacewatch	V	630 m	MPC · JPL
339998	2005 UT_{292}	—	October 26, 2005	Kitt Peak	Spacewatch	NYS	940 m	MPC · JPL
339999	2005 UW_{292}	—	October 26, 2005	Kitt Peak	Spacewatch	·	1.1 km	MPC · JPL
340000	2005 UV_{297}	—	October 26, 2005	Kitt Peak	Spacewatch	·	920 m	MPC · JPL

back to top

== See also ==
- Meanings of minor-planet names: 339001–340000
