= List of minor planets: 338001–339000 =

The following is a partial list of minor planets, running from minor-planet number 338001 through 339000, inclusive. The primary data for this and other partial lists is based on JPL's "Small-Body Orbital Elements" and data available from the Minor Planet Center. Critical list information is also provided by the MPC, unless otherwise specified from Lowell Observatory. A detailed description of the table's columns and additional sources are given on the main page including a complete list of every page in this series, and a statistical break-up on the dynamical classification of minor planets.

Also see the summary list of all named bodies in numerical and alphabetical order, and the corresponding naming citations for the number range of this particular list. New namings may only be added to this list after official publication, as the preannouncement of names is condemned by the Working Group for Small Bodies Nomenclature of the International Astronomical Union.

Near-Earth obj.	MBA (inner)	MBA (outer)	Centaur
Mars-crosser	MBA (middle)	Jupiter trojan	Trans-Neptunian obj.
Unclassified

== 338001–338100 ==
Designation			Discovery			Properties		Ref
Permanent	Provisional	Named after	Date	Site	Discoverer(s)	Category	Diam.	Ref
338001	2002 EK_{33}	—	March 11, 2002	Palomar	NEAT	·	1.8 km	MPC · JPL
338002	2002 EX_{50}	—	March 12, 2002	Palomar	NEAT	·	1.9 km	MPC · JPL
338003	2002 EK_{62}	—	March 13, 2002	Socorro	LINEAR	·	1.8 km	MPC · JPL
338004	2002 EA_{73}	—	March 13, 2002	Socorro	LINEAR	(194)	1.9 km	MPC · JPL
338005	2002 EO_{81}	—	March 13, 2002	Palomar	NEAT	·	2.0 km	MPC · JPL
338006	2002 EN_{106}	—	March 9, 2002	Anderson Mesa	LONEOS	·	3.0 km	MPC · JPL
338007	2002 EH_{111}	—	March 9, 2002	Anderson Mesa	LONEOS	·	2.2 km	MPC · JPL
338008	2002 EU_{114}	—	March 10, 2002	Kitt Peak	Spacewatch	RAF	1.3 km	MPC · JPL
338009	2002 ED_{130}	—	March 12, 2002	Anderson Mesa	LONEOS	CYB	3.3 km	MPC · JPL
338010	2002 EH_{140}	—	March 12, 2002	Palomar	NEAT	·	1.4 km	MPC · JPL
338011	2002 EE_{143}	—	March 12, 2002	Palomar	NEAT	·	1.7 km	MPC · JPL
338012	2002 EL_{147}	—	March 15, 2002	Palomar	NEAT	·	1.5 km	MPC · JPL
338013	2002 EN_{161}	—	March 6, 2002	Palomar	NEAT	·	1.2 km	MPC · JPL
338014	2002 ES_{162}	—	March 14, 2002	Palomar	NEAT	ADE	1.9 km	MPC · JPL
338015	2002 FE_{20}	—	March 18, 2002	Haleakala	NEAT	·	2.0 km	MPC · JPL
338016	2002 FT_{21}	—	March 19, 2002	Anderson Mesa	LONEOS	·	1.2 km	MPC · JPL
338017	2002 FA_{30}	—	March 20, 2002	Kitt Peak	Spacewatch	·	2.3 km	MPC · JPL
338018	2002 FM_{41}	—	March 16, 2002	Kitt Peak	Spacewatch	·	1.4 km	MPC · JPL
338019	2002 GT_{5}	—	March 20, 2002	Socorro	LINEAR	EUN	1.7 km	MPC · JPL
338020	2002 GA_{47}	—	April 4, 2002	Palomar	NEAT	MAR	1.3 km	MPC · JPL
338021	2002 GZ_{60}	—	April 8, 2002	Palomar	NEAT	·	1.6 km	MPC · JPL
338022	2002 GV_{68}	—	April 8, 2002	Palomar	NEAT	·	1.1 km	MPC · JPL
338023	2002 GS_{93}	—	April 9, 2002	Socorro	LINEAR	·	1.7 km	MPC · JPL
338024	2002 GX_{99}	—	April 10, 2002	Socorro	LINEAR	·	1.3 km	MPC · JPL
338025	2002 GU_{135}	—	April 12, 2002	Socorro	LINEAR	·	2.3 km	MPC · JPL
338026	2002 GR_{145}	—	April 12, 2002	Socorro	LINEAR	·	2.0 km	MPC · JPL
338027	2002 GV_{148}	—	April 14, 2002	Socorro	LINEAR	·	1.5 km	MPC · JPL
338028	2002 GQ_{152}	—	April 12, 2002	Palomar	NEAT	·	2.8 km	MPC · JPL
338029	2002 GF_{164}	—	April 14, 2002	Palomar	NEAT	EUN	1.4 km	MPC · JPL
338030	2002 GH_{172}	—	April 10, 2002	Socorro	LINEAR	EUN	1.6 km	MPC · JPL
338031	2002 GJ_{179}	—	April 10, 2002	Palomar	NEAT	TIN	1.8 km	MPC · JPL
338032	2002 GZ_{180}	—	April 13, 2002	Palomar	NEAT	·	1.6 km	MPC · JPL
338033	2002 HW_{5}	—	April 18, 2002	Kitt Peak	Spacewatch	·	2.4 km	MPC · JPL
338034	2002 JK_{30}	—	May 9, 2002	Socorro	LINEAR	·	2.6 km	MPC · JPL
338035	2002 JL_{53}	—	May 9, 2002	Socorro	LINEAR	JUN	1.3 km	MPC · JPL
338036	2002 JN_{58}	—	May 9, 2002	Socorro	LINEAR	EUN	2.0 km	MPC · JPL
338037	2002 JH_{70}	—	May 7, 2002	Socorro	LINEAR	JUN	1.5 km	MPC · JPL
338038	2002 JA_{77}	—	May 11, 2002	Socorro	LINEAR	·	2.3 km	MPC · JPL
338039	2002 JO_{81}	—	May 11, 2002	Socorro	LINEAR	·	2.0 km	MPC · JPL
338040	2002 JD_{85}	—	May 11, 2002	Socorro	LINEAR	·	2.2 km	MPC · JPL
338041	2002 JW_{149}	—	May 7, 2002	Palomar	NEAT	·	1.8 km	MPC · JPL
338042	2002 LS	—	June 1, 2002	Socorro	LINEAR	H	740 m	MPC · JPL
338043	2002 LZ	—	March 17, 2002	Kitt Peak	Spacewatch	·	2.5 km	MPC · JPL
338044	2002 LD_{10}	—	June 5, 2002	Socorro	LINEAR	·	2.1 km	MPC · JPL
338045	2002 LM_{63}	—	June 12, 2002	Palomar	NEAT	·	760 m	MPC · JPL
338046	2002 LP_{63}	—	June 12, 2002	Palomar	NEAT	·	2.5 km	MPC · JPL
338047	2002 NP	—	July 4, 2002	Kitt Peak	Spacewatch	BRA	1.4 km	MPC · JPL
338048	2002 NL_{6}	—	July 11, 2002	Campo Imperatore	CINEOS	·	2.0 km	MPC · JPL
338049	2002 NY_{31}	—	July 15, 2002	Palomar	NEAT	AMO · APO +1km	1.2 km	MPC · JPL
338050	2002 NR_{54}	—	July 5, 2002	Socorro	LINEAR	·	3.0 km	MPC · JPL
338051	2002 NY_{69}	—	June 16, 2002	Palomar	NEAT	·	2.4 km	MPC · JPL
338052	2002 NE_{74}	—	July 14, 2002	Palomar	NEAT	HOF	2.7 km	MPC · JPL
338053	2002 NK_{74}	—	July 5, 2002	Palomar	NEAT	·	2.1 km	MPC · JPL
338054	2002 NN_{77}	—	January 17, 2005	Kitt Peak	Spacewatch	HOF	3.0 km	MPC · JPL
338055	2002 NU_{77}	—	April 2, 2006	Kitt Peak	Spacewatch	·	1.8 km	MPC · JPL
338056	2002 NF_{78}	—	October 27, 2003	Kitt Peak	Spacewatch	·	2.4 km	MPC · JPL
338057	2002 NN_{78}	—	June 13, 2005	Mount Lemmon	Mount Lemmon Survey	·	850 m	MPC · JPL
338058	2002 NQ_{79}	—	July 20, 2002	Palomar	NEAT	·	3.1 km	MPC · JPL
338059	2002 NW_{79}	—	February 2, 2005	Kitt Peak	Spacewatch	·	2.8 km	MPC · JPL
338060	2002 OS_{24}	—	July 29, 2002	Palomar	S. F. Hönig	AGN	1.3 km	MPC · JPL
338061	2002 OD_{27}	—	July 21, 2002	Palomar	NEAT	·	2.5 km	MPC · JPL
338062	2002 OF_{30}	—	July 21, 2002	Palomar	NEAT	·	800 m	MPC · JPL
338063	2002 OF_{32}	—	July 18, 2002	Palomar	NEAT	·	2.1 km	MPC · JPL
338064	2002 OF_{35}	—	March 9, 2005	Kitt Peak	Spacewatch	·	2.5 km	MPC · JPL
338065	2002 OJ_{36}	—	August 13, 2002	Palomar	NEAT	·	700 m	MPC · JPL
338066	2002 PV_{12}	—	August 5, 2002	Palomar	NEAT	·	2.2 km	MPC · JPL
338067	2002 PT_{13}	—	August 6, 2002	Palomar	NEAT	·	630 m	MPC · JPL
338068	2002 PN_{16}	—	August 6, 2002	Palomar	NEAT	·	2.3 km	MPC · JPL
338069	2002 PR_{16}	—	August 6, 2002	Palomar	NEAT	·	2.4 km	MPC · JPL
338070	2002 PV_{20}	—	August 6, 2002	Palomar	NEAT	·	720 m	MPC · JPL
338071	2002 PJ_{27}	—	August 6, 2002	Palomar	NEAT	·	760 m	MPC · JPL
338072	2002 PM_{32}	—	August 6, 2002	Palomar	NEAT	·	630 m	MPC · JPL
338073	2002 PY_{38}	—	August 6, 2002	Palomar	NEAT	·	530 m	MPC · JPL
338074	2002 PA_{39}	—	August 6, 2002	Palomar	NEAT	AGN	1.5 km	MPC · JPL
338075	2002 PM_{55}	—	August 9, 2002	Socorro	LINEAR	·	1.1 km	MPC · JPL
338076	2002 PW_{61}	—	August 8, 2002	Palomar	NEAT	·	660 m	MPC · JPL
338077	2002 PA_{85}	—	August 10, 2002	Socorro	LINEAR	·	2.2 km	MPC · JPL
338078	2002 PA_{106}	—	August 12, 2002	Socorro	LINEAR	·	650 m	MPC · JPL
338079	2002 PB_{107}	—	August 12, 2002	Socorro	LINEAR	·	2.0 km	MPC · JPL
338080	2002 PK_{107}	—	August 12, 2002	Haleakala	NEAT	DOR	3.0 km	MPC · JPL
338081	2002 PC_{114}	—	August 13, 2002	Kitt Peak	Spacewatch	·	620 m	MPC · JPL
338082	2002 PU_{118}	—	August 13, 2002	Anderson Mesa	LONEOS	·	770 m	MPC · JPL
338083	2002 PF_{119}	—	August 13, 2002	Anderson Mesa	LONEOS	·	730 m	MPC · JPL
338084	2002 PP_{135}	—	August 14, 2002	Socorro	LINEAR	·	710 m	MPC · JPL
338085	2002 PH_{141}	—	August 11, 2002	Socorro	LINEAR	·	1 km	MPC · JPL
338086	2002 PM_{169}	—	August 8, 2002	Palomar	NEAT	·	2.1 km	MPC · JPL
338087	2002 PC_{174}	—	August 8, 2002	Palomar	NEAT	HOF	2.8 km	MPC · JPL
338088	2002 PH_{174}	—	August 12, 2002	Haleakala	NEAT	·	810 m	MPC · JPL
338089	2002 PK_{176}	—	August 7, 2002	Palomar	NEAT	·	2.3 km	MPC · JPL
338090	2002 PM_{177}	—	August 8, 2002	Palomar	NEAT	·	3.2 km	MPC · JPL
338091	2002 PB_{179}	—	August 15, 2002	Palomar	NEAT	AGN	1.4 km	MPC · JPL
338092	2002 PJ_{182}	—	August 8, 2002	Palomar	NEAT	GEF	1.3 km	MPC · JPL
338093	2002 PE_{184}	—	August 13, 2002	Anderson Mesa	LONEOS	·	710 m	MPC · JPL
338094	2002 PP_{186}	—	August 11, 2002	Palomar	NEAT	BRA	1.7 km	MPC · JPL
338095	2002 PT_{186}	—	August 11, 2002	Palomar	NEAT	·	740 m	MPC · JPL
338096	2002 PC_{187}	—	August 11, 2002	Palomar	NEAT	·	2.3 km	MPC · JPL
338097	2002 PP_{187}	—	August 15, 2002	Palomar	NEAT	·	800 m	MPC · JPL
338098	2002 PO_{188}	—	August 8, 2002	Palomar	NEAT	·	2.7 km	MPC · JPL
338099	2002 PU_{189}	—	August 8, 2002	Palomar	NEAT	·	730 m	MPC · JPL
338100	2002 PY_{189}	—	September 10, 2007	Mount Lemmon	Mount Lemmon Survey	·	1.8 km	MPC · JPL

== 338101–338200 ==
back to top

Designation			Discovery			Properties		Ref
Permanent	Provisional	Named after	Date	Site	Discoverer(s)	Category	Diam.	Ref
338101	2002 PD_{196}	—	April 11, 2008	Mount Lemmon	Mount Lemmon Survey	·	840 m	MPC · JPL
338102	2002 PQ_{197}	—	April 7, 2008	Kitt Peak	Spacewatch	·	690 m	MPC · JPL
338103	2002 PV_{197}	—	October 25, 2003	Kitt Peak	Spacewatch	·	2.4 km	MPC · JPL
338104	2002 PP_{200}	—	November 20, 2003	Kitt Peak	Spacewatch	·	2.3 km	MPC · JPL
338105	2002 PE_{201}	—	April 23, 2001	Socorro	LINEAR	·	3.3 km	MPC · JPL
338106	2002 QH_{7}	—	August 16, 2002	Palomar	NEAT	·	3.2 km	MPC · JPL
338107	2002 QS_{14}	—	August 26, 2002	Palomar	NEAT	·	760 m	MPC · JPL
338108	2002 QQ_{26}	—	August 29, 2002	Kitt Peak	Spacewatch	BRA	1.4 km	MPC · JPL
338109	2002 QJ_{31}	—	August 29, 2002	Palomar	NEAT	·	2.6 km	MPC · JPL
338110	2002 QW_{46}	—	August 30, 2002	Palomar	NEAT	·	2.8 km	MPC · JPL
338111	2002 QD_{48}	—	August 27, 2002	Palomar	S. F. Hönig	·	590 m	MPC · JPL
338112	2002 QJ_{53}	—	August 17, 2002	Palomar	Lowe, A.	·	790 m	MPC · JPL
338113	2002 QJ_{55}	—	August 29, 2002	Palomar	S. F. Hönig	·	2.2 km	MPC · JPL
338114	2002 QG_{56}	—	August 29, 2002	Palomar	S. F. Hönig	·	770 m	MPC · JPL
338115	2002 QE_{58}	—	August 17, 2002	Palomar	Lowe, A.	·	520 m	MPC · JPL
338116	2002 QP_{62}	—	August 28, 2002	Palomar	NEAT	615	1.8 km	MPC · JPL
338117	2002 QK_{63}	—	August 28, 2002	Palomar	NEAT	·	2.8 km	MPC · JPL
338118	2002 QZ_{69}	—	August 28, 2002	Palomar	NEAT	·	710 m	MPC · JPL
338119	2002 QU_{70}	—	August 18, 2002	Palomar	NEAT	·	1.9 km	MPC · JPL
338120	2002 QY_{70}	—	August 17, 2002	Palomar	NEAT	·	530 m	MPC · JPL
338121	2002 QZ_{73}	—	August 19, 2002	Palomar	NEAT	·	680 m	MPC · JPL
338122	2002 QE_{74}	—	August 28, 2002	Palomar	NEAT	·	740 m	MPC · JPL
338123	2002 QC_{78}	—	August 27, 2002	Palomar	NEAT	·	700 m	MPC · JPL
338124	2002 QV_{81}	—	August 19, 2002	Palomar	NEAT	·	730 m	MPC · JPL
338125	2002 QQ_{83}	—	August 17, 2002	Palomar	NEAT	·	2.1 km	MPC · JPL
338126	2002 QD_{87}	—	August 19, 2002	Palomar	NEAT	·	730 m	MPC · JPL
338127	2002 QA_{89}	—	August 27, 2002	Palomar	NEAT	·	600 m	MPC · JPL
338128	2002 QU_{89}	—	August 19, 2002	Palomar	NEAT	·	790 m	MPC · JPL
338129	2002 QL_{90}	—	August 19, 2002	Palomar	NEAT	(16286)	2.4 km	MPC · JPL
338130	2002 QP_{90}	—	August 28, 2002	Palomar	NEAT	·	2.7 km	MPC · JPL
338131	2002 QW_{90}	—	August 30, 2002	Palomar	NEAT	BRA	1.5 km	MPC · JPL
338132	2002 QS_{93}	—	August 18, 2002	Palomar	NEAT	·	2.0 km	MPC · JPL
338133	2002 QX_{96}	—	August 18, 2002	Palomar	NEAT	·	580 m	MPC · JPL
338134	2002 QE_{98}	—	August 18, 2002	Palomar	NEAT	·	2.0 km	MPC · JPL
338135	2002 QP_{100}	—	August 19, 2002	Palomar	NEAT	·	3.6 km	MPC · JPL
338136	2002 QE_{101}	—	August 30, 2002	Palomar	NEAT	·	2.8 km	MPC · JPL
338137	2002 QR_{107}	—	August 27, 2002	Palomar	NEAT	AGN	1.3 km	MPC · JPL
338138	2002 QF_{108}	—	August 17, 2002	Palomar	NEAT	·	670 m	MPC · JPL
338139	2002 QU_{108}	—	August 17, 2002	Palomar	NEAT	·	1.6 km	MPC · JPL
338140	2002 QE_{110}	—	August 27, 2002	Palomar	NEAT	AGN	1.3 km	MPC · JPL
338141	2002 QG_{115}	—	August 19, 2002	Palomar	NEAT	·	880 m	MPC · JPL
338142	2002 QK_{115}	—	August 18, 2002	Palomar	NEAT	·	690 m	MPC · JPL
338143	2002 QU_{115}	—	August 18, 2002	Palomar	NEAT	·	760 m	MPC · JPL
338144	2002 QA_{117}	—	August 26, 2002	Palomar	NEAT	·	2.4 km	MPC · JPL
338145	2002 QU_{120}	—	August 30, 2002	Palomar	NEAT	HOF	3.2 km	MPC · JPL
338146	2002 QA_{126}	—	August 17, 2002	Palomar	NEAT	·	640 m	MPC · JPL
338147	2002 QE_{127}	—	August 29, 2002	Palomar	NEAT	·	590 m	MPC · JPL
338148	2002 QO_{128}	—	August 29, 2002	Palomar	NEAT	·	1.7 km	MPC · JPL
338149	2002 QP_{128}	—	August 29, 2002	Palomar	NEAT	KOR	1.6 km	MPC · JPL
338150	2002 QY_{129}	—	December 31, 2008	Kitt Peak	Spacewatch	·	2.1 km	MPC · JPL
338151	2002 QX_{131}	—	August 30, 2002	Palomar	NEAT	·	540 m	MPC · JPL
338152	2002 QS_{132}	—	August 27, 2002	Palomar	NEAT	615	1.5 km	MPC · JPL
338153	2002 QP_{136}	—	August 26, 2002	Palomar	NEAT	HOF	2.7 km	MPC · JPL
338154	2002 QN_{142}	—	September 12, 2007	Dauban	C. Rinner, F. Kugel	·	1.8 km	MPC · JPL
338155	2002 QU_{146}	—	September 12, 2007	Mount Lemmon	Mount Lemmon Survey	KOR	1.7 km	MPC · JPL
338156	2002 QG_{147}	—	April 30, 2006	Kitt Peak	Spacewatch	·	1.8 km	MPC · JPL
338157	2002 QZ_{149}	—	October 6, 2007	Socorro	LINEAR	AGN	1.6 km	MPC · JPL
338158	2002 QX_{150}	—	November 28, 2006	Mount Lemmon	Mount Lemmon Survey	·	790 m	MPC · JPL
338159	2002 RY	—	September 3, 2002	Palomar	NEAT	·	740 m	MPC · JPL
338160	2002 RP_{2}	—	September 4, 2002	Anderson Mesa	LONEOS	·	1.1 km	MPC · JPL
338161	2002 RH_{6}	—	September 1, 2002	Haleakala	NEAT	·	780 m	MPC · JPL
338162	2002 RL_{15}	—	September 4, 2002	Anderson Mesa	LONEOS	·	830 m	MPC · JPL
338163	2002 RT_{22}	—	September 4, 2002	Anderson Mesa	LONEOS	·	820 m	MPC · JPL
338164	2002 RP_{35}	—	September 5, 2002	Anderson Mesa	LONEOS	·	2.5 km	MPC · JPL
338165	2002 RR_{66}	—	September 3, 2002	Palomar	NEAT	·	2.3 km	MPC · JPL
338166	2002 RZ_{66}	—	September 3, 2002	Palomar	NEAT	·	1.4 km	MPC · JPL
338167	2002 RR_{69}	—	September 4, 2002	Anderson Mesa	LONEOS	·	710 m	MPC · JPL
338168	2002 RX_{77}	—	September 5, 2002	Socorro	LINEAR	·	720 m	MPC · JPL
338169	2002 RP_{78}	—	August 30, 2002	Anderson Mesa	LONEOS	·	800 m	MPC · JPL
338170	2002 RV_{84}	—	September 5, 2002	Socorro	LINEAR	·	910 m	MPC · JPL
338171	2002 RL_{111}	—	September 6, 2002	Socorro	LINEAR	·	1.1 km	MPC · JPL
338172	2002 RV_{112}	—	September 7, 2002	Socorro	LINEAR	AMO +1km	1.2 km	MPC · JPL
338173	2002 RV_{115}	—	September 6, 2002	Socorro	LINEAR	·	1.9 km	MPC · JPL
338174	2002 RY_{115}	—	September 6, 2002	Socorro	LINEAR	·	2.8 km	MPC · JPL
338175	2002 RD_{116}	—	August 20, 2002	Palomar	NEAT	·	720 m	MPC · JPL
338176	2002 RC_{118}	—	September 6, 2002	Socorro	LINEAR	T_{j} (2.86) · AMO +1km	1.5 km	MPC · JPL
338177	2002 RU_{125}	—	September 6, 2002	Socorro	LINEAR	·	670 m	MPC · JPL
338178	2002 RJ_{126}	—	September 8, 2002	Campo Imperatore	CINEOS	·	770 m	MPC · JPL
338179	2002 RC_{132}	—	September 11, 2002	Haleakala	NEAT	·	910 m	MPC · JPL
338180	2002 RX_{132}	—	September 9, 2002	Haleakala	NEAT	·	850 m	MPC · JPL
338181	2002 RE_{158}	—	September 11, 2002	Palomar	NEAT	·	600 m	MPC · JPL
338182	2002 RF_{165}	—	September 12, 2002	Palomar	NEAT	·	4.0 km	MPC · JPL
338183	2002 RP_{170}	—	September 13, 2002	Palomar	NEAT	·	2.2 km	MPC · JPL
338184	2002 RA_{173}	—	September 13, 2002	Socorro	LINEAR	·	870 m	MPC · JPL
338185	2002 RY_{182}	—	September 11, 2002	Palomar	NEAT	·	3.1 km	MPC · JPL
338186	2002 RK_{183}	—	September 11, 2002	Palomar	NEAT	·	2.7 km	MPC · JPL
338187	2002 RK_{200}	—	September 13, 2002	Palomar	NEAT	·	640 m	MPC · JPL
338188	2002 RW_{200}	—	September 1, 2002	Palomar	NEAT	·	730 m	MPC · JPL
338189	2002 RE_{203}	—	September 13, 2002	Palomar	NEAT	·	660 m	MPC · JPL
338190	2002 RV_{210}	—	September 15, 2002	Kitt Peak	Spacewatch	·	1.7 km	MPC · JPL
338191	2002 RO_{240}	—	September 14, 2002	Palomar	R. Matson	·	2.4 km	MPC · JPL
338192	2002 RW_{255}	—	September 4, 2002	Palomar	NEAT	·	670 m	MPC · JPL
338193	2002 RQ_{257}	—	September 4, 2002	Palomar	NEAT	KOR	1.3 km	MPC · JPL
338194	2002 RM_{261}	—	September 11, 2002	Palomar	NEAT	·	1.8 km	MPC · JPL
338195	2002 RB_{268}	—	September 12, 2002	Palomar	NEAT	·	640 m	MPC · JPL
338196	2002 RQ_{269}	—	September 4, 2002	Palomar	NEAT	·	2.1 km	MPC · JPL
338197	2002 RM_{270}	—	September 4, 2002	Palomar	NEAT	AGN	1.3 km	MPC · JPL
338198	2002 RX_{273}	—	September 15, 2002	Palomar	NEAT	·	520 m	MPC · JPL
338199	2002 RS_{275}	—	September 14, 2002	Palomar	NEAT	KOR	1.3 km	MPC · JPL
338200	2002 RQ_{278}	—	September 15, 2002	Palomar	NEAT	KOR	2.0 km	MPC · JPL

== 338201–338300 ==
back to top

Designation			Discovery			Properties		Ref
Permanent	Provisional	Named after	Date	Site	Discoverer(s)	Category	Diam.	Ref
338201	2002 RX_{278}	—	September 12, 2002	Palomar	NEAT	BRA	1.7 km	MPC · JPL
338202	2002 RS_{289}	—	September 12, 2007	Catalina	CSS	·	2.7 km	MPC · JPL
338203	2002 RJ_{290}	—	September 4, 2007	Catalina	CSS	·	2.4 km	MPC · JPL
338204	2002 SS	—	September 23, 2002	Powell	Powell	·	2.1 km	MPC · JPL
338205	2002 SQ_{2}	—	September 27, 2002	Palomar	NEAT	H	740 m	MPC · JPL
338206	2002 SC_{18}	—	September 27, 2002	Palomar	NEAT	·	760 m	MPC · JPL
338207	2002 SJ_{18}	—	September 28, 2002	Palomar	NEAT	·	650 m	MPC · JPL
338208	2002 ST_{24}	—	September 28, 2002	Palomar	NEAT	·	780 m	MPC · JPL
338209	2002 SF_{25}	—	September 28, 2002	Haleakala	NEAT	·	870 m	MPC · JPL
338210	2002 SF_{34}	—	September 29, 2002	Haleakala	NEAT	·	2.0 km	MPC · JPL
338211	2002 SZ_{34}	—	September 29, 2002	Haleakala	NEAT	·	2.9 km	MPC · JPL
338212	2002 SP_{35}	—	September 29, 2002	Haleakala	NEAT	·	960 m	MPC · JPL
338213	2002 SJ_{44}	—	September 5, 2002	Socorro	LINEAR	·	1.1 km	MPC · JPL
338214	2002 SO_{59}	—	August 11, 2002	Haleakala	NEAT	·	950 m	MPC · JPL
338215	2002 SA_{60}	—	September 16, 2002	Palomar	NEAT	·	810 m	MPC · JPL
338216	2002 SE_{70}	—	September 26, 2002	Palomar	NEAT	·	2.1 km	MPC · JPL
338217	2002 TX_{6}	—	October 1, 2002	Anderson Mesa	LONEOS	·	1.1 km	MPC · JPL
338218	2002 TR_{8}	—	October 1, 2002	Haleakala	NEAT	·	940 m	MPC · JPL
338219	2002 TH_{9}	—	October 1, 2002	Anderson Mesa	LONEOS	·	810 m	MPC · JPL
338220	2002 TF_{12}	—	October 1, 2002	Anderson Mesa	LONEOS	BRA	1.7 km	MPC · JPL
338221	2002 TM_{12}	—	October 1, 2002	Anderson Mesa	LONEOS	·	720 m	MPC · JPL
338222	2002 TA_{17}	—	October 2, 2002	Socorro	LINEAR	·	780 m	MPC · JPL
338223	2002 TK_{34}	—	October 2, 2002	Socorro	LINEAR	·	2.1 km	MPC · JPL
338224	2002 TB_{42}	—	October 2, 2002	Socorro	LINEAR	·	860 m	MPC · JPL
338225	2002 TQ_{43}	—	October 2, 2002	Socorro	LINEAR	·	770 m	MPC · JPL
338226	2002 TC_{57}	—	October 1, 2002	Anderson Mesa	LONEOS	H	550 m	MPC · JPL
338227	2002 TR_{62}	—	October 3, 2002	Campo Imperatore	CINEOS	·	2.7 km	MPC · JPL
338228	2002 TS_{64}	—	October 3, 2002	Socorro	LINEAR	·	730 m	MPC · JPL
338229	2002 TN_{66}	—	October 3, 2002	Socorro	LINEAR	H	610 m	MPC · JPL
338230	2002 TD_{73}	—	October 3, 2002	Palomar	NEAT	·	1.1 km	MPC · JPL
338231	2002 TB_{74}	—	October 3, 2002	Palomar	NEAT	·	970 m	MPC · JPL
338232	2002 TD_{75}	—	October 1, 2002	Anderson Mesa	LONEOS	·	1.1 km	MPC · JPL
338233	2002 TY_{75}	—	October 1, 2002	Anderson Mesa	LONEOS	·	720 m	MPC · JPL
338234	2002 TY_{77}	—	October 1, 2002	Anderson Mesa	LONEOS	·	2.3 km	MPC · JPL
338235	2002 TU_{85}	—	October 2, 2002	Campo Imperatore	CINEOS	·	870 m	MPC · JPL
338236	2002 TZ_{88}	—	October 3, 2002	Palomar	NEAT	·	840 m	MPC · JPL
338237	2002 TS_{98}	—	October 3, 2002	Socorro	LINEAR	·	2.5 km	MPC · JPL
338238	2002 TN_{105}	—	October 4, 2002	Anderson Mesa	LONEOS	·	710 m	MPC · JPL
338239	2002 TH_{106}	—	October 4, 2002	Palomar	NEAT	·	2.1 km	MPC · JPL
338240	2002 TW_{109}	—	October 2, 2002	Haleakala	NEAT	EOS	2.7 km	MPC · JPL
338241	2002 TL_{116}	—	October 3, 2002	Palomar	NEAT	·	2.3 km	MPC · JPL
338242	2002 TJ_{133}	—	October 4, 2002	Socorro	LINEAR	·	980 m	MPC · JPL
338243	2002 TG_{134}	—	October 4, 2002	Palomar	NEAT	·	3.1 km	MPC · JPL
338244	2002 TD_{149}	—	October 5, 2002	Palomar	NEAT	·	880 m	MPC · JPL
338245	2002 TV_{151}	—	October 5, 2002	Palomar	NEAT	·	880 m	MPC · JPL
338246	2002 TP_{157}	—	October 5, 2002	Palomar	NEAT	·	4.2 km	MPC · JPL
338247	2002 TC_{176}	—	October 4, 2002	Anderson Mesa	LONEOS	·	3.8 km	MPC · JPL
338248	2002 TJ_{178}	—	October 12, 2002	Socorro	LINEAR	·	1 km	MPC · JPL
338249	2002 TX_{182}	—	October 4, 2002	Socorro	LINEAR	·	1.9 km	MPC · JPL
338250	2002 TD_{186}	—	October 4, 2002	Socorro	LINEAR	·	1.1 km	MPC · JPL
338251	2002 TW_{187}	—	October 4, 2002	Socorro	LINEAR	·	770 m	MPC · JPL
338252	2002 TJ_{195}	—	October 3, 2002	Socorro	LINEAR	·	5.8 km	MPC · JPL
338253	2002 TZ_{198}	—	October 5, 2002	Socorro	LINEAR	·	2.3 km	MPC · JPL
338254	2002 TZ_{206}	—	October 4, 2002	Socorro	LINEAR	·	900 m	MPC · JPL
338255	2002 TS_{222}	—	October 7, 2002	Socorro	LINEAR	·	700 m	MPC · JPL
338256	2002 TL_{223}	—	October 2, 2002	Haleakala	NEAT	·	850 m	MPC · JPL
338257	2002 TO_{229}	—	October 9, 2002	Socorro	LINEAR	·	850 m	MPC · JPL
338258	2002 TB_{232}	—	October 6, 2002	Socorro	LINEAR	·	2.4 km	MPC · JPL
338259	2002 TH_{235}	—	October 6, 2002	Socorro	LINEAR	·	3.1 km	MPC · JPL
338260	2002 TE_{239}	—	October 8, 2002	Anderson Mesa	LONEOS	·	2.4 km	MPC · JPL
338261	2002 TP_{251}	—	October 7, 2002	Haleakala	NEAT	EOS	2.6 km	MPC · JPL
338262	2002 TM_{252}	—	October 8, 2002	Anderson Mesa	LONEOS	·	890 m	MPC · JPL
338263	2002 TA_{253}	—	October 8, 2002	Anderson Mesa	LONEOS	H	590 m	MPC · JPL
338264	2002 TL_{253}	—	October 8, 2002	Anderson Mesa	LONEOS	·	1.6 km	MPC · JPL
338265	2002 TX_{265}	—	October 10, 2002	Socorro	LINEAR	T_{j} (2.95)	4.2 km	MPC · JPL
338266	2002 TV_{267}	—	October 9, 2002	Socorro	LINEAR	·	670 m	MPC · JPL
338267	2002 TQ_{271}	—	October 9, 2002	Socorro	LINEAR	·	780 m	MPC · JPL
338268	2002 TT_{271}	—	October 9, 2002	Socorro	LINEAR	·	740 m	MPC · JPL
338269	2002 TE_{290}	—	October 10, 2002	Socorro	LINEAR	·	710 m	MPC · JPL
338270	2002 TM_{294}	—	October 11, 2002	Socorro	LINEAR	·	830 m	MPC · JPL
338271	2002 TO_{298}	—	October 12, 2002	Socorro	LINEAR	·	2.4 km	MPC · JPL
338272	2002 TE_{299}	—	October 13, 2002	Kitt Peak	Spacewatch	·	650 m	MPC · JPL
338273	2002 TY_{300}	—	October 15, 2002	Palomar	NEAT	·	830 m	MPC · JPL
338274 Valančius	2002 TM_{303}	Valančius	October 5, 2002	Palomar	K. Černis	·	1.9 km	MPC · JPL
338275	2002 TM_{307}	—	October 4, 2002	Apache Point	SDSS	·	710 m	MPC · JPL
338276	2002 TZ_{309}	—	October 4, 2002	Apache Point	SDSS	·	2.5 km	MPC · JPL
338277	2002 TC_{323}	—	October 5, 2002	Apache Point	SDSS	·	2.0 km	MPC · JPL
338278	2002 TQ_{327}	—	October 5, 2002	Apache Point	SDSS	·	1.7 km	MPC · JPL
338279	2002 TQ_{328}	—	October 5, 2002	Apache Point	SDSS	TRE	2.1 km	MPC · JPL
338280	2002 TG_{345}	—	October 5, 2002	Apache Point	SDSS	·	2.4 km	MPC · JPL
338281	2002 TS_{352}	—	October 10, 2002	Apache Point	SDSS	·	660 m	MPC · JPL
338282	2002 TB_{367}	—	October 10, 2002	Apache Point	SDSS	·	690 m	MPC · JPL
338283	2002 TQ_{379}	—	October 6, 2002	Palomar	NEAT	·	690 m	MPC · JPL
338284 Hodál	2002 TW_{381}	Hodál	October 9, 2002	Palomar	NEAT	H	460 m	MPC · JPL
338285	2002 TC_{383}	—	October 15, 2002	Palomar	NEAT	·	870 m	MPC · JPL
338286	2002 UT_{8}	—	September 15, 2002	Anderson Mesa	LONEOS	·	3.6 km	MPC · JPL
338287	2002 UB_{10}	—	October 2, 2002	Socorro	LINEAR	·	1.0 km	MPC · JPL
338288	2002 UG_{13}	—	October 28, 2002	Haleakala	NEAT	·	2.5 km	MPC · JPL
338289	2002 UD_{17}	—	October 31, 2002	Anderson Mesa	LONEOS	H	640 m	MPC · JPL
338290	2002 UJ_{23}	—	October 31, 2002	Socorro	LINEAR	H	750 m	MPC · JPL
338291	2002 UJ_{27}	—	October 31, 2002	Palomar	NEAT	·	780 m	MPC · JPL
338292	2002 UA_{31}	—	October 31, 2002	Socorro	LINEAR	ATE	540 m	MPC · JPL
338293	2002 UZ_{35}	—	October 31, 2002	Palomar	NEAT	·	660 m	MPC · JPL
338294	2002 UK_{41}	—	October 31, 2002	Palomar	NEAT	·	870 m	MPC · JPL
338295	2002 US_{45}	—	October 31, 2002	Anderson Mesa	LONEOS	·	5.2 km	MPC · JPL
338296	2002 UO_{57}	—	October 15, 2002	Palomar	NEAT	·	830 m	MPC · JPL
338297	2002 UR_{64}	—	October 30, 2002	Apache Point	SDSS	·	580 m	MPC · JPL
338298	2002 UY_{66}	—	October 30, 2002	Apache Point	SDSS	·	1.8 km	MPC · JPL
338299	2002 UQ_{70}	—	October 30, 2002	Apache Point	SDSS	·	710 m	MPC · JPL
338300	2002 UX_{70}	—	October 30, 2002	Socorro	LINEAR	H	560 m	MPC · JPL

== 338301–338400 ==
back to top

Designation			Discovery			Properties		Ref
Permanent	Provisional	Named after	Date	Site	Discoverer(s)	Category	Diam.	Ref
338301	2002 UU_{71}	—	October 31, 2002	Palomar	NEAT	NAE	4.8 km	MPC · JPL
338302	2002 UE_{74}	—	October 31, 2002	Palomar	NEAT	·	1.8 km	MPC · JPL
338303	2002 UN_{75}	—	October 31, 2002	Palomar	NEAT	KOR	1.4 km	MPC · JPL
338304	2002 US_{75}	—	October 31, 2002	Palomar	NEAT	·	790 m	MPC · JPL
338305	2002 VO_{3}	—	November 1, 2002	Palomar	NEAT	·	3.9 km	MPC · JPL
338306	2002 VC_{9}	—	November 1, 2002	Palomar	NEAT	EOS	2.2 km	MPC · JPL
338307	2002 VO_{10}	—	November 1, 2002	Palomar	NEAT	·	3.0 km	MPC · JPL
338308	2002 VB_{17}	—	October 31, 2002	Anderson Mesa	LONEOS	·	970 m	MPC · JPL
338309	2002 VR_{17}	—	November 7, 2002	Socorro	LINEAR	·	840 m	MPC · JPL
338310	2002 VA_{28}	—	November 5, 2002	Anderson Mesa	LONEOS	H	750 m	MPC · JPL
338311	2002 VJ_{31}	—	November 5, 2002	Socorro	LINEAR	·	2.6 km	MPC · JPL
338312	2002 VK_{38}	—	November 5, 2002	Socorro	LINEAR	EOS	4.8 km	MPC · JPL
338313	2002 VN_{44}	—	November 4, 2002	Haleakala	NEAT	·	3.4 km	MPC · JPL
338314	2002 VU_{53}	—	November 6, 2002	Socorro	LINEAR	·	820 m	MPC · JPL
338315	2002 VT_{55}	—	November 6, 2002	Socorro	LINEAR	·	2.2 km	MPC · JPL
338316	2002 VY_{59}	—	November 3, 2002	Haleakala	NEAT	·	1.1 km	MPC · JPL
338317	2002 VU_{66}	—	November 6, 2002	Socorro	LINEAR	·	1.1 km	MPC · JPL
338318	2002 VG_{68}	—	November 3, 2002	La Palma	A. Fitzsimmons	·	850 m	MPC · JPL
338319	2002 VO_{77}	—	November 7, 2002	Socorro	LINEAR	·	3.6 km	MPC · JPL
338320	2002 VN_{86}	—	November 8, 2002	Socorro	LINEAR	H	500 m	MPC · JPL
338321	2002 VR_{90}	—	November 7, 2002	Needville	Needville	·	2.1 km	MPC · JPL
338322	2002 VC_{94}	—	November 12, 2002	Socorro	LINEAR	EOS	2.8 km	MPC · JPL
338323	2002 VV_{98}	—	November 13, 2002	Kitt Peak	Spacewatch	·	1.0 km	MPC · JPL
338324	2002 VL_{102}	—	November 12, 2002	Socorro	LINEAR	·	920 m	MPC · JPL
338325	2002 VZ_{110}	—	November 13, 2002	Palomar	NEAT	·	3.4 km	MPC · JPL
338326	2002 VN_{120}	—	November 12, 2002	Palomar	NEAT	·	2.8 km	MPC · JPL
338327	2002 VD_{124}	—	November 14, 2002	Socorro	LINEAR	·	4.5 km	MPC · JPL
338328	2002 VQ_{127}	—	November 15, 2002	Socorro	LINEAR	·	4.0 km	MPC · JPL
338329	2002 VT_{128}	—	October 30, 2002	Kitt Peak	Spacewatch	·	2.2 km	MPC · JPL
338330	2002 VT_{131}	—	November 5, 2002	Mount Nyukasa	National Aerospace Laboratory of Japan	·	1.9 km	MPC · JPL
338331	2002 VD_{132}	—	November 5, 2002	Mount Nyukasa	National Aerospace Laboratory of Japan	EOS	2.3 km	MPC · JPL
338332	2002 VY_{138}	—	November 14, 2002	Palomar	NEAT	·	4.2 km	MPC · JPL
338333	2002 VQ_{141}	—	November 13, 2002	Palomar	NEAT	L5	10 km	MPC · JPL
338334	2002 VH_{142}	—	November 5, 2002	Palomar	NEAT	·	760 m	MPC · JPL
338335	2002 WA_{1}	—	November 22, 2002	Palomar	NEAT	H	440 m	MPC · JPL
338336	2002 WB_{1}	—	November 22, 2002	Palomar	NEAT	·	880 m	MPC · JPL
338337	2002 WP_{3}	—	November 24, 2002	Palomar	NEAT	·	2.4 km	MPC · JPL
338338	2002 WJ_{7}	—	November 24, 2002	Palomar	NEAT	·	2.7 km	MPC · JPL
338339	2002 WG_{8}	—	November 24, 2002	Palomar	NEAT	·	2.3 km	MPC · JPL
338340	2002 WZ_{17}	—	November 28, 2002	Haleakala	NEAT	EOS	2.3 km	MPC · JPL
338341	2002 WA_{19}	—	November 29, 2002	Pla D'Arguines	D'Arguines, Pla	·	2.9 km	MPC · JPL
338342	2002 WV_{19}	—	November 24, 2002	Palomar	S. F. Hönig	·	760 m	MPC · JPL
338343	2002 WY_{19}	—	November 24, 2002	Palomar	S. F. Hönig	L5 · 010	10 km	MPC · JPL
338344	2002 WX_{21}	—	November 24, 2002	Palomar	NEAT	·	850 m	MPC · JPL
338345	2002 WM_{24}	—	November 16, 2002	Palomar	NEAT	L5	10 km	MPC · JPL
338346	2002 XV_{2}	—	December 1, 2002	Socorro	LINEAR	·	2.3 km	MPC · JPL
338347	2002 XG_{4}	—	December 2, 2002	Socorro	LINEAR	AMO +1km	1.4 km	MPC · JPL
338348	2002 XY_{11}	—	December 3, 2002	Palomar	NEAT	·	860 m	MPC · JPL
338349	2002 XR_{15}	—	December 3, 2002	Palomar	NEAT	·	3.1 km	MPC · JPL
338350	2002 XF_{17}	—	December 3, 2002	Palomar	NEAT	·	2.2 km	MPC · JPL
338351	2002 XH_{19}	—	December 2, 2002	Socorro	LINEAR	·	780 m	MPC · JPL
338352	2002 XZ_{22}	—	December 3, 2002	Haleakala	NEAT	·	950 m	MPC · JPL
338353	2002 XE_{24}	—	December 5, 2002	Socorro	LINEAR	·	2.1 km	MPC · JPL
338354	2002 XX_{27}	—	December 5, 2002	Socorro	LINEAR	·	1.0 km	MPC · JPL
338355	2002 XV_{31}	—	December 6, 2002	Socorro	LINEAR	·	840 m	MPC · JPL
338356	2002 XJ_{35}	—	December 8, 2002	Desert Eagle	W. K. Y. Yeung	·	2.0 km	MPC · JPL
338357	2002 XA_{39}	—	December 10, 2002	Socorro	LINEAR	·	3.6 km	MPC · JPL
338358	2002 XB_{41}	—	December 6, 2002	Socorro	LINEAR	·	5.2 km	MPC · JPL
338359	2002 XD_{48}	—	December 10, 2002	Socorro	LINEAR	·	2.8 km	MPC · JPL
338360	2002 XO_{50}	—	December 10, 2002	Socorro	LINEAR	EOS	2.4 km	MPC · JPL
338361	2002 XL_{59}	—	December 10, 2002	Socorro	LINEAR	·	990 m	MPC · JPL
338362	2002 XP_{63}	—	December 11, 2002	Socorro	LINEAR	·	2.3 km	MPC · JPL
338363	2002 XV_{73}	—	December 11, 2002	Socorro	LINEAR	·	2.7 km	MPC · JPL
338364	2002 XH_{98}	—	December 5, 2002	Socorro	LINEAR	·	970 m	MPC · JPL
338365	2002 XJ_{98}	—	December 5, 2002	Socorro	LINEAR	·	890 m	MPC · JPL
338366	2002 XJ_{99}	—	December 5, 2002	Socorro	LINEAR	·	2.3 km	MPC · JPL
338367	2002 XR_{106}	—	December 5, 2002	Socorro	LINEAR	·	1 km	MPC · JPL
338368	2002 XO_{118}	—	December 3, 2002	Palomar	NEAT	·	2.1 km	MPC · JPL
338369	2002 XQ_{118}	—	December 3, 2002	Palomar	NEAT	·	790 m	MPC · JPL
338370	2002 XW_{118}	—	December 10, 2002	Palomar	NEAT	BAP	970 m	MPC · JPL
338371 Gerritsen	2002 XO_{119}	Gerritsen	December 10, 2002	Palomar	NEAT	·	2.1 km	MPC · JPL
338372	2002 XM_{120}	—	December 3, 2002	Palomar	NEAT	L5	12 km	MPC · JPL
338373 Fonóalbert	2002 YG_{3}	Fonóalbert	December 25, 2002	Piszkéstető	K. Sárneczky	·	3.3 km	MPC · JPL
338374	2002 YB_{5}	—	December 28, 2002	Socorro	LINEAR	·	2.7 km	MPC · JPL
338375	2002 YK_{8}	—	December 31, 2002	Socorro	LINEAR	·	2.5 km	MPC · JPL
338376	2002 YR_{9}	—	December 31, 2002	Socorro	LINEAR	·	1.2 km	MPC · JPL
338377	2002 YR_{14}	—	December 31, 2002	Socorro	LINEAR	·	3.1 km	MPC · JPL
338378	2002 YM_{21}	—	December 31, 2002	Socorro	LINEAR	·	1.1 km	MPC · JPL
338379	2002 YD_{22}	—	December 31, 2002	Socorro	LINEAR	·	4.1 km	MPC · JPL
338380	2002 YD_{27}	—	December 31, 2002	Socorro	LINEAR	·	2.2 km	MPC · JPL
338381	2002 YD_{30}	—	December 31, 2002	Socorro	LINEAR	·	3.4 km	MPC · JPL
338382	2002 YO_{34}	—	December 31, 2002	Socorro	LINEAR	·	3.3 km	MPC · JPL
338383	2002 YU_{36}	—	December 27, 2002	Palomar	NEAT	·	2.0 km	MPC · JPL
338384	2003 AA_{1}	—	January 1, 2003	Socorro	LINEAR	·	4.8 km	MPC · JPL
338385	2003 AL_{1}	—	January 1, 2003	Socorro	LINEAR	·	1.2 km	MPC · JPL
338386	2003 AJ_{4}	—	January 3, 2003	Nashville	Clingan, R.	·	680 m	MPC · JPL
338387	2003 AL_{5}	—	January 1, 2003	Socorro	LINEAR	·	1.4 km	MPC · JPL
338388	2003 AA_{14}	—	January 1, 2003	Socorro	LINEAR	·	3.8 km	MPC · JPL
338389	2003 AW_{21}	—	January 5, 2003	Socorro	LINEAR	·	1.4 km	MPC · JPL
338390	2003 AP_{33}	—	January 5, 2003	Socorro	LINEAR	·	1.4 km	MPC · JPL
338391	2003 AN_{40}	—	January 7, 2003	Socorro	LINEAR	·	1.1 km	MPC · JPL
338392	2003 AO_{40}	—	January 7, 2003	Socorro	LINEAR	·	1.3 km	MPC · JPL
338393	2003 AG_{52}	—	January 5, 2003	Socorro	LINEAR	·	3.5 km	MPC · JPL
338394	2003 AV_{53}	—	January 5, 2003	Socorro	LINEAR	·	2.7 km	MPC · JPL
338395	2003 AL_{61}	—	January 7, 2003	Socorro	LINEAR	EUP	6.2 km	MPC · JPL
338396	2003 AG_{67}	—	January 7, 2003	Socorro	LINEAR	·	4.7 km	MPC · JPL
338397	2003 AW_{77}	—	January 10, 2003	Socorro	LINEAR	·	2.5 km	MPC · JPL
338398	2003 AS_{86}	—	January 1, 2003	Socorro	LINEAR	·	3.0 km	MPC · JPL
338399	2003 AP_{90}	—	January 5, 2003	Socorro	LINEAR	·	1.1 km	MPC · JPL
338400	2003 BK	—	January 20, 2003	Wrightwood	J. W. Young	·	3.0 km	MPC · JPL

== 338401–338500 ==
back to top

Designation			Discovery			Properties		Ref
Permanent	Provisional	Named after	Date	Site	Discoverer(s)	Category	Diam.	Ref
338401	2003 BZ_{4}	—	January 24, 2003	La Silla	A. Boattini, H. Scholl	·	4.1 km	MPC · JPL
338402	2003 BH_{6}	—	January 23, 2003	Kvistaberg	Uppsala-DLR Asteroid Survey	TIR	4.0 km	MPC · JPL
338403	2003 BJ_{11}	—	January 26, 2003	Anderson Mesa	LONEOS	·	1.4 km	MPC · JPL
338404	2003 BK_{14}	—	January 26, 2003	Haleakala	NEAT	·	1.4 km	MPC · JPL
338405	2003 BB_{19}	—	January 27, 2003	Anderson Mesa	LONEOS	·	4.6 km	MPC · JPL
338406	2003 BG_{21}	—	January 27, 2003	Socorro	LINEAR	H	800 m	MPC · JPL
338407	2003 BS_{21}	—	January 27, 2003	Anderson Mesa	LONEOS	H	730 m	MPC · JPL
338408	2003 BL_{28}	—	January 26, 2003	Haleakala	NEAT	·	5.6 km	MPC · JPL
338409	2003 BQ_{29}	—	January 27, 2003	Socorro	LINEAR	·	4.1 km	MPC · JPL
338410	2003 BB_{32}	—	January 27, 2003	Socorro	LINEAR	·	2.2 km	MPC · JPL
338411	2003 BH_{33}	—	January 27, 2003	Haleakala	NEAT	·	4.4 km	MPC · JPL
338412	2003 BD_{41}	—	January 28, 2003	Socorro	LINEAR	·	1.4 km	MPC · JPL
338413	2003 BL_{48}	—	January 26, 2003	Kitt Peak	Spacewatch	·	2.7 km	MPC · JPL
338414	2003 BA_{50}	—	January 27, 2003	Socorro	LINEAR	·	810 m	MPC · JPL
338415	2003 BD_{50}	—	January 27, 2003	Socorro	LINEAR	·	1.1 km	MPC · JPL
338416	2003 BH_{57}	—	December 5, 2002	Kitt Peak	Spacewatch	·	2.4 km	MPC · JPL
338417	2003 BY_{59}	—	January 27, 2003	Socorro	LINEAR	THB	3.9 km	MPC · JPL
338418	2003 BC_{60}	—	January 27, 2003	Socorro	LINEAR	·	4.7 km	MPC · JPL
338419	2003 BR_{60}	—	January 27, 2003	Palomar	NEAT	·	2.0 km	MPC · JPL
338420	2003 BQ_{62}	—	January 28, 2003	Palomar	NEAT	·	3.3 km	MPC · JPL
338421	2003 BV_{64}	—	January 30, 2003	Anderson Mesa	LONEOS	·	1.4 km	MPC · JPL
338422	2003 BT_{77}	—	January 30, 2003	Anderson Mesa	LONEOS	·	1.1 km	MPC · JPL
338423	2003 BZ_{84}	—	January 31, 2003	Socorro	LINEAR	·	4.2 km	MPC · JPL
338424	2003 BX_{90}	—	January 31, 2003	Anderson Mesa	LONEOS	·	2.8 km	MPC · JPL
338425	2003 CM_{1}	—	February 1, 2003	Palomar	NEAT	T_{j} (2.99)	6.9 km	MPC · JPL
338426	2003 CO_{2}	—	February 1, 2003	Haleakala	NEAT	H	700 m	MPC · JPL
338427	2003 CV_{4}	—	February 1, 2003	Socorro	LINEAR	·	3.6 km	MPC · JPL
338428	2003 CA_{8}	—	February 1, 2003	Socorro	LINEAR	PHO	2.2 km	MPC · JPL
338429	2003 CB_{10}	—	February 2, 2003	Socorro	LINEAR	·	3.9 km	MPC · JPL
338430	2003 CZ_{13}	—	February 4, 2003	Kitt Peak	Spacewatch	THM	2.5 km	MPC · JPL
338431	2003 CP_{14}	—	February 3, 2003	Socorro	LINEAR	·	1.2 km	MPC · JPL
338432	2003 CU_{17}	—	February 7, 2003	Palomar	NEAT	·	1.3 km	MPC · JPL
338433	2003 CK_{25}	—	February 1, 2003	Palomar	NEAT	·	4.8 km	MPC · JPL
338434	2003 CN_{25}	—	February 3, 2003	Anderson Mesa	LONEOS	·	1.7 km	MPC · JPL
338435	2003 CC_{26}	—	February 2, 2003	Palomar	NEAT	·	1.7 km	MPC · JPL
338436	2003 DR_{9}	—	February 25, 2003	Campo Imperatore	CINEOS	V	1.0 km	MPC · JPL
338437	2003 DF_{17}	—	February 24, 2003	Needville	Dillon, W. G., J. Dellinger	EOS	2.9 km	MPC · JPL
338438	2003 EH_{15}	—	March 7, 2003	Socorro	LINEAR	·	2.0 km	MPC · JPL
338439	2003 ER_{15}	—	March 7, 2003	Socorro	LINEAR	·	1.8 km	MPC · JPL
338440	2003 EA_{18}	—	March 6, 2003	Anderson Mesa	LONEOS	LIX	5.0 km	MPC · JPL
338441	2003 EO_{31}	—	March 7, 2003	Socorro	LINEAR	·	3.4 km	MPC · JPL
338442	2003 EQ_{33}	—	March 7, 2003	Kitt Peak	Spacewatch	·	1.2 km	MPC · JPL
338443	2003 EU_{40}	—	March 8, 2003	Palomar	NEAT	·	5.1 km	MPC · JPL
338444	2003 ED_{41}	—	March 8, 2003	Palomar	NEAT	THB	3.2 km	MPC · JPL
338445	2003 ET_{47}	—	March 9, 2003	Anderson Mesa	LONEOS	·	1.7 km	MPC · JPL
338446	2003 EV_{47}	—	March 9, 2003	Anderson Mesa	LONEOS	H	720 m	MPC · JPL
338447	2003 ER_{49}	—	March 10, 2003	Socorro	LINEAR	·	1.8 km	MPC · JPL
338448	2003 EX_{49}	—	March 10, 2003	Palomar	NEAT	·	1.3 km	MPC · JPL
338449	2003 EY_{50}	—	March 10, 2003	Kitt Peak	Spacewatch	H	640 m	MPC · JPL
338450	2003 EG_{55}	—	March 9, 2003	Kitt Peak	Deep Lens Survey	·	2.9 km	MPC · JPL
338451	2003 EO_{62}	—	March 9, 2003	Socorro	LINEAR	PHO	2.5 km	MPC · JPL
338452	2003 FO_{2}	—	March 23, 2003	Eskridge	G. Hug	·	1.3 km	MPC · JPL
338453	2003 FY_{3}	—	March 26, 2003	Palomar	NEAT	H	760 m	MPC · JPL
338454	2003 FE_{5}	—	March 24, 2003	Nashville	Clingan, R.	·	3.4 km	MPC · JPL
338455	2003 FS_{5}	—	March 26, 2003	Campo Imperatore	CINEOS	·	1.7 km	MPC · JPL
338456	2003 FO_{8}	—	March 31, 2003	Socorro	LINEAR	H	680 m	MPC · JPL
338457	2003 FG_{13}	—	March 23, 2003	Kitt Peak	Spacewatch	·	3.6 km	MPC · JPL
338458	2003 FE_{20}	—	March 23, 2003	Palomar	NEAT	·	2.2 km	MPC · JPL
338459	2003 FO_{26}	—	March 24, 2003	Kitt Peak	Spacewatch	NYS	1.5 km	MPC · JPL
338460	2003 FL_{27}	—	March 24, 2003	Kitt Peak	Spacewatch	·	1.5 km	MPC · JPL
338461	2003 FE_{34}	—	March 23, 2003	Kitt Peak	Spacewatch	NYS	1.2 km	MPC · JPL
338462	2003 FS_{48}	—	March 24, 2003	Kitt Peak	Spacewatch	·	1.0 km	MPC · JPL
338463	2003 FX_{60}	—	March 26, 2003	Palomar	NEAT	·	3.5 km	MPC · JPL
338464	2003 FP_{63}	—	March 26, 2003	Palomar	NEAT	·	1.7 km	MPC · JPL
338465	2003 FV_{67}	—	March 26, 2003	Kitt Peak	Spacewatch	PHO	1.3 km	MPC · JPL
338466	2003 FT_{68}	—	March 26, 2003	Palomar	NEAT	·	1.4 km	MPC · JPL
338467	2003 FX_{69}	—	March 26, 2003	Kitt Peak	Spacewatch	·	1.4 km	MPC · JPL
338468	2003 FP_{75}	—	March 27, 2003	Kitt Peak	Spacewatch	LIX	4.5 km	MPC · JPL
338469	2003 FY_{76}	—	March 27, 2003	Kitt Peak	Spacewatch	MAS	910 m	MPC · JPL
338470	2003 FC_{83}	—	March 27, 2003	Palomar	NEAT	·	1.8 km	MPC · JPL
338471	2003 FV_{86}	—	March 28, 2003	Kitt Peak	Spacewatch	·	1.7 km	MPC · JPL
338472	2003 FU_{101}	—	March 31, 2003	Kitt Peak	Spacewatch	·	1.4 km	MPC · JPL
338473	2003 FG_{112}	—	March 31, 2003	Kitt Peak	Spacewatch	·	3.7 km	MPC · JPL
338474	2003 FR_{127}	—	March 31, 2003	Catalina	CSS	·	3.9 km	MPC · JPL
338475	2003 FF_{131}	—	March 24, 2003	Kitt Peak	Spacewatch	·	1.1 km	MPC · JPL
338476	2003 GF_{40}	—	April 9, 2003	Socorro	LINEAR	·	1.6 km	MPC · JPL
338477	2003 GQ_{49}	—	April 10, 2003	Kitt Peak	Spacewatch	·	2.0 km	MPC · JPL
338478	2003 GS_{53}	—	April 3, 2003	Anderson Mesa	LONEOS	H	650 m	MPC · JPL
338479	2003 HO	—	April 6, 2003	Kitt Peak	Spacewatch	NYS	1.3 km	MPC · JPL
338480	2003 HD_{2}	—	April 24, 2003	Kitt Peak	Spacewatch	H	560 m	MPC · JPL
338481	2003 HA_{4}	—	April 24, 2003	Anderson Mesa	LONEOS	·	1.5 km	MPC · JPL
338482	2003 HH_{4}	—	April 24, 2003	Anderson Mesa	LONEOS	·	4.2 km	MPC · JPL
338483	2003 HY_{10}	—	April 25, 2003	Kitt Peak	Spacewatch	H	600 m	MPC · JPL
338484	2003 HO_{14}	—	April 26, 2003	Socorro	LINEAR	H	840 m	MPC · JPL
338485	2003 HU_{38}	—	April 29, 2003	Anderson Mesa	LONEOS	NYS	1.4 km	MPC · JPL
338486	2003 HY_{38}	—	April 29, 2003	Socorro	LINEAR	·	2.1 km	MPC · JPL
338487	2003 HZ_{38}	—	April 29, 2003	Socorro	LINEAR	EUN	1.5 km	MPC · JPL
338488	2003 HF_{43}	—	April 29, 2003	Socorro	LINEAR	RAF	1.1 km	MPC · JPL
338489	2003 JZ_{4}	—	May 1, 2003	Socorro	LINEAR	T_{j} (2.98)	4.9 km	MPC · JPL
338490	2003 KS_{12}	—	May 26, 2003	Kitt Peak	Spacewatch	·	1.2 km	MPC · JPL
338491	2003 KA_{19}	—	May 31, 2003	Kitt Peak	Spacewatch	·	2.0 km	MPC · JPL
338492	2003 KC_{31}	—	May 26, 2003	Kitt Peak	Spacewatch	JUN	640 m	MPC · JPL
338493	2003 LL_{9}	—	June 6, 2003	Kitt Peak	Spacewatch	·	1.7 km	MPC · JPL
338494	2003 MD_{6}	—	June 26, 2003	Socorro	LINEAR	MAR	2.2 km	MPC · JPL
338495	2003 NU_{1}	—	July 2, 2003	Socorro	LINEAR	·	2.3 km	MPC · JPL
338496	2003 NJ_{12}	—	July 3, 2003	Kitt Peak	Spacewatch	·	2.0 km	MPC · JPL
338497	2003 OC_{12}	—	July 28, 2003	Palomar	NEAT	EUN	1.3 km	MPC · JPL
338498	2003 OD_{14}	—	July 29, 2003	Socorro	LINEAR	JUN	1.1 km	MPC · JPL
338499	2003 OT_{14}	—	July 22, 2003	Palomar	NEAT	EUN	1.5 km	MPC · JPL
338500	2003 OO_{16}	—	July 26, 2003	Palomar	NEAT	·	4.2 km	MPC · JPL

== 338501–338600 ==
back to top

Designation			Discovery			Properties		Ref
Permanent	Provisional	Named after	Date	Site	Discoverer(s)	Category	Diam.	Ref
338501	2003 OW_{24}	—	July 24, 2003	Palomar	NEAT	·	2.0 km	MPC · JPL
338502	2003 PJ_{9}	—	August 4, 2003	Kitt Peak	Spacewatch	·	2.8 km	MPC · JPL
338503	2003 PO_{11}	—	August 5, 2003	Kvistaberg	Uppsala-DLR Asteroid Survey	EUN	1.6 km	MPC · JPL
338504	2003 PW_{11}	—	August 1, 2003	Socorro	LINEAR	·	2.2 km	MPC · JPL
338505	2003 PB_{12}	—	August 2, 2003	Bergisch Gladbach	W. Bickel	·	1.9 km	MPC · JPL
338506	2003 QO_{5}	—	August 18, 2003	Campo Imperatore	CINEOS	ADE	2.6 km	MPC · JPL
338507	2003 QV_{7}	—	August 21, 2003	Palomar	NEAT	·	1.8 km	MPC · JPL
338508	2003 QS_{14}	—	August 20, 2003	Palomar	NEAT	·	1.8 km	MPC · JPL
338509	2003 QN_{17}	—	August 22, 2003	Palomar	NEAT	·	2.0 km	MPC · JPL
338510	2003 QY_{21}	—	August 20, 2003	Palomar	NEAT	·	1.9 km	MPC · JPL
338511	2003 QS_{22}	—	August 20, 2003	Palomar	NEAT	·	1.6 km	MPC · JPL
338512	2003 QL_{29}	—	August 23, 2003	Črni Vrh	Skvarč, J.	·	2.2 km	MPC · JPL
338513	2003 QD_{32}	—	August 21, 2003	Palomar	NEAT	·	1.8 km	MPC · JPL
338514	2003 QR_{41}	—	August 1, 2003	Socorro	LINEAR	·	2.3 km	MPC · JPL
338515	2003 QU_{48}	—	August 21, 2003	Haleakala	NEAT	·	2.5 km	MPC · JPL
338516	2003 QT_{49}	—	August 22, 2003	Haleakala	NEAT	EUN	1.6 km	MPC · JPL
338517	2003 QP_{53}	—	August 23, 2003	Socorro	LINEAR	EUN	1.6 km	MPC · JPL
338518	2003 QG_{60}	—	August 23, 2003	Socorro	LINEAR	·	2.0 km	MPC · JPL
338519	2003 QE_{61}	—	August 23, 2003	Socorro	LINEAR	·	1.9 km	MPC · JPL
338520	2003 QN_{66}	—	August 22, 2003	Socorro	LINEAR	EUN	1.7 km	MPC · JPL
338521	2003 QV_{81}	—	August 23, 2003	Socorro	LINEAR	EUN	1.6 km	MPC · JPL
338522	2003 QS_{85}	—	August 24, 2003	Socorro	LINEAR	·	2.2 km	MPC · JPL
338523	2003 QR_{89}	—	August 27, 2003	Haleakala	NEAT	·	2.5 km	MPC · JPL
338524	2003 QB_{97}	—	August 30, 2003	Kitt Peak	Spacewatch	·	1.4 km	MPC · JPL
338525	2003 QX_{108}	—	August 2, 2003	Haleakala	NEAT	·	2.5 km	MPC · JPL
338526	2003 QD_{115}	—	August 25, 2003	Palomar	NEAT	·	2.2 km	MPC · JPL
338527	2003 QH_{115}	—	August 28, 2003	Palomar	NEAT	JUN	990 m	MPC · JPL
338528	2003 RG_{2}	—	September 3, 2003	Reedy Creek	J. Broughton	·	2.3 km	MPC · JPL
338529	2003 RO_{14}	—	September 14, 2003	Haleakala	NEAT	·	2.5 km	MPC · JPL
338530	2003 RO_{16}	—	September 15, 2003	Palomar	NEAT	·	2.2 km	MPC · JPL
338531	2003 RX_{16}	—	September 15, 2003	Palomar	NEAT	·	1.5 km	MPC · JPL
338532	2003 RO_{19}	—	September 15, 2003	Anderson Mesa	LONEOS	·	1.6 km	MPC · JPL
338533	2003 RJ_{22}	—	September 15, 2003	Haleakala	NEAT	·	3.0 km	MPC · JPL
338534	2003 RJ_{23}	—	September 13, 2003	Haleakala	NEAT	·	2.5 km	MPC · JPL
338535	2003 RC_{25}	—	September 15, 2003	Palomar	NEAT	·	5.1 km	MPC · JPL
338536	2003 RH_{25}	—	September 15, 2003	Palomar	NEAT	·	2.5 km	MPC · JPL
338537	2003 SX_{4}	—	September 16, 2003	Kleť	M. Tichý	·	2.7 km	MPC · JPL
338538	2003 SW_{7}	—	September 16, 2003	Palomar	NEAT	·	2.2 km	MPC · JPL
338539	2003 SD_{8}	—	September 16, 2003	Kitt Peak	Spacewatch	·	1.6 km	MPC · JPL
338540	2003 SR_{10}	—	September 17, 2003	Kitt Peak	Spacewatch	·	2.0 km	MPC · JPL
338541	2003 SE_{12}	—	September 16, 2003	Kitt Peak	Spacewatch	·	1.8 km	MPC · JPL
338542	2003 SO_{22}	—	September 16, 2003	Kitt Peak	Spacewatch	·	2.7 km	MPC · JPL
338543	2003 SZ_{23}	—	September 17, 2003	Socorro	LINEAR	·	2.3 km	MPC · JPL
338544	2003 SW_{28}	—	September 18, 2003	Palomar	NEAT	·	2.2 km	MPC · JPL
338545	2003 ST_{34}	—	September 18, 2003	Palomar	NEAT	·	1.7 km	MPC · JPL
338546	2003 SB_{35}	—	September 18, 2003	Kitt Peak	Spacewatch	·	1.7 km	MPC · JPL
338547	2003 SF_{35}	—	September 18, 2003	Kitt Peak	Spacewatch	·	1.6 km	MPC · JPL
338548	2003 SR_{40}	—	September 16, 2003	Palomar	NEAT	·	4.5 km	MPC · JPL
338549	2003 SV_{40}	—	September 16, 2003	Palomar	NEAT	(18466)	2.9 km	MPC · JPL
338550	2003 SW_{47}	—	September 18, 2003	Palomar	NEAT	·	4.0 km	MPC · JPL
338551	2003 SR_{49}	—	September 18, 2003	Palomar	NEAT	EUN	2.1 km	MPC · JPL
338552	2003 SJ_{53}	—	September 16, 2003	Kitt Peak	Spacewatch	·	2.9 km	MPC · JPL
338553	2003 SK_{53}	—	September 16, 2003	Kitt Peak	Spacewatch	·	1.2 km	MPC · JPL
338554	2003 SD_{57}	—	September 3, 2003	Socorro	LINEAR	·	2.1 km	MPC · JPL
338555	2003 SJ_{58}	—	September 17, 2003	Anderson Mesa	LONEOS	·	2.6 km	MPC · JPL
338556	2003 SF_{59}	—	September 17, 2003	Anderson Mesa	LONEOS	·	2.2 km	MPC · JPL
338557	2003 SJ_{59}	—	September 17, 2003	Anderson Mesa	LONEOS	·	3.2 km	MPC · JPL
338558	2003 SA_{60}	—	September 17, 2003	Anderson Mesa	LONEOS	·	2.6 km	MPC · JPL
338559	2003 SW_{61}	—	September 17, 2003	Socorro	LINEAR	·	2.2 km	MPC · JPL
338560	2003 SD_{62}	—	September 17, 2003	Kitt Peak	Spacewatch	·	2.4 km	MPC · JPL
338561	2003 SF_{65}	—	September 18, 2003	Anderson Mesa	LONEOS	·	2.8 km	MPC · JPL
338562	2003 SQ_{65}	—	September 18, 2003	Anderson Mesa	LONEOS	JUN	950 m	MPC · JPL
338563	2003 SH_{71}	—	September 18, 2003	Kitt Peak	Spacewatch	·	2.2 km	MPC · JPL
338564	2003 SR_{73}	—	September 18, 2003	Kitt Peak	Spacewatch	WIT	1.0 km	MPC · JPL
338565	2003 SN_{81}	—	September 19, 2003	Kitt Peak	Spacewatch	·	2.9 km	MPC · JPL
338566	2003 SW_{81}	—	September 16, 2003	Anderson Mesa	LONEOS	·	1.7 km	MPC · JPL
338567	2003 SJ_{84}	—	September 19, 2003	Kitt Peak	Spacewatch	AMO	480 m	MPC · JPL
338568	2003 SD_{85}	—	September 16, 2003	Palomar	NEAT	·	2.1 km	MPC · JPL
338569	2003 ST_{85}	—	September 16, 2003	Kitt Peak	Spacewatch	·	2.5 km	MPC · JPL
338570	2003 SD_{86}	—	September 16, 2003	Palomar	NEAT	·	3.2 km	MPC · JPL
338571	2003 SR_{86}	—	September 16, 2003	Palomar	NEAT	·	3.4 km	MPC · JPL
338572	2003 SJ_{92}	—	September 18, 2003	Kitt Peak	Spacewatch	·	1.5 km	MPC · JPL
338573	2003 SL_{94}	—	September 19, 2003	Campo Imperatore	CINEOS	·	3.2 km	MPC · JPL
338574	2003 SZ_{104}	—	September 20, 2003	Palomar	NEAT	·	3.1 km	MPC · JPL
338575	2003 SV_{107}	—	September 20, 2003	Palomar	NEAT	·	2.2 km	MPC · JPL
338576	2003 SK_{108}	—	September 20, 2003	Palomar	NEAT	·	3.2 km	MPC · JPL
338577	2003 SS_{111}	—	September 17, 2003	Socorro	LINEAR	·	2.3 km	MPC · JPL
338578 Csapodyvera	2003 SU_{111}	Csapodyvera	September 20, 2003	Piszkéstető	K. Sárneczky, B. Sipőcz	·	1.5 km	MPC · JPL
338579	2003 SB_{112}	—	September 18, 2003	Goodricke-Pigott	R. A. Tucker	·	3.5 km	MPC · JPL
338580	2003 SX_{120}	—	September 17, 2003	Socorro	LINEAR	·	3.2 km	MPC · JPL
338581	2003 SE_{121}	—	September 17, 2003	Kitt Peak	Spacewatch	·	1.5 km	MPC · JPL
338582	2003 SJ_{125}	—	September 19, 2003	Palomar	NEAT	WIT	1.3 km	MPC · JPL
338583	2003 SO_{126}	—	September 19, 2003	Haleakala	NEAT	·	2.8 km	MPC · JPL
338584	2003 SA_{134}	—	September 18, 2003	Socorro	LINEAR	·	5.0 km	MPC · JPL
338585	2003 SR_{139}	—	September 18, 2003	Palomar	NEAT	·	1.9 km	MPC · JPL
338586	2003 ST_{139}	—	September 18, 2003	Kitt Peak	Spacewatch	·	2.4 km	MPC · JPL
338587	2003 SZ_{142}	—	September 20, 2003	Haleakala	NEAT	·	3.1 km	MPC · JPL
338588	2003 SA_{144}	—	September 21, 2003	Socorro	LINEAR	·	1.8 km	MPC · JPL
338589	2003 SP_{144}	—	September 19, 2003	Palomar	NEAT	·	2.8 km	MPC · JPL
338590	2003 SK_{145}	—	September 20, 2003	Palomar	NEAT	·	3.4 km	MPC · JPL
338591	2003 SW_{145}	—	September 20, 2003	Palomar	NEAT	·	2.0 km	MPC · JPL
338592	2003 SA_{148}	—	September 16, 2003	Socorro	LINEAR	·	2.1 km	MPC · JPL
338593	2003 SH_{150}	—	September 17, 2003	Socorro	LINEAR	·	2.6 km	MPC · JPL
338594	2003 SM_{150}	—	September 17, 2003	Socorro	LINEAR	·	2.3 km	MPC · JPL
338595	2003 SO_{150}	—	September 17, 2003	Socorro	LINEAR	·	2.7 km	MPC · JPL
338596	2003 SB_{157}	—	September 19, 2003	Anderson Mesa	LONEOS	·	2.5 km	MPC · JPL
338597	2003 SB_{159}	—	September 19, 2003	Kitt Peak	Spacewatch	·	2.0 km	MPC · JPL
338598	2003 SZ_{165}	—	September 20, 2003	Črni Vrh	Skvarč, J.	·	2.6 km	MPC · JPL
338599	2003 SX_{168}	—	September 23, 2003	Haleakala	NEAT	EUN	1.7 km	MPC · JPL
338600	2003 ST_{170}	—	September 21, 2003	Uccle	T. Pauwels	·	1.9 km	MPC · JPL

== 338601–338700 ==
back to top

Designation			Discovery			Properties		Ref
Permanent	Provisional	Named after	Date	Site	Discoverer(s)	Category	Diam.	Ref
338601	2003 SS_{173}	—	September 18, 2003	Palomar	NEAT	·	2.2 km	MPC · JPL
338602	2003 SX_{174}	—	September 18, 2003	Kitt Peak	Spacewatch	·	1.8 km	MPC · JPL
338603	2003 ST_{180}	—	September 19, 2003	Haleakala	NEAT	·	2.5 km	MPC · JPL
338604	2003 SM_{187}	—	September 21, 2003	Socorro	LINEAR	·	2.9 km	MPC · JPL
338605	2003 SO_{187}	—	September 21, 2003	Kitt Peak	Spacewatch	·	2.4 km	MPC · JPL
338606	2003 SM_{189}	—	September 22, 2003	Kitt Peak	Spacewatch	·	2.2 km	MPC · JPL
338607	2003 SQ_{189}	—	September 23, 2003	Palomar	NEAT	EUN	1.3 km	MPC · JPL
338608	2003 SN_{197}	—	September 21, 2003	Anderson Mesa	LONEOS	·	2.5 km	MPC · JPL
338609	2003 SF_{198}	—	September 21, 2003	Anderson Mesa	LONEOS	·	3.2 km	MPC · JPL
338610	2003 ST_{198}	—	September 21, 2003	Anderson Mesa	LONEOS	·	3.2 km	MPC · JPL
338611	2003 SW_{202}	—	September 22, 2003	Anderson Mesa	LONEOS	·	1.9 km	MPC · JPL
338612	2003 SY_{208}	—	September 23, 2003	Haleakala	NEAT	·	1.8 km	MPC · JPL
338613	2003 SQ_{209}	—	September 24, 2003	Kvistaberg	Uppsala-DLR Asteroid Survey	·	2.2 km	MPC · JPL
338614	2003 SF_{211}	—	September 24, 2003	Palomar	NEAT	EUN	1.5 km	MPC · JPL
338615	2003 SX_{211}	—	September 25, 2003	Palomar	NEAT	·	2.4 km	MPC · JPL
338616	2003 SX_{221}	—	September 28, 2003	Desert Eagle	W. K. Y. Yeung	·	2.1 km	MPC · JPL
338617	2003 SQ_{226}	—	September 26, 2003	Desert Eagle	W. K. Y. Yeung	·	2.0 km	MPC · JPL
338618	2003 SX_{226}	—	September 26, 2003	Socorro	LINEAR	·	2.7 km	MPC · JPL
338619	2003 SU_{229}	—	September 27, 2003	Kitt Peak	Spacewatch	·	1.9 km	MPC · JPL
338620	2003 SF_{241}	—	September 17, 2003	Kitt Peak	Spacewatch	·	2.2 km	MPC · JPL
338621	2003 SL_{242}	—	September 27, 2003	Kitt Peak	Spacewatch	·	2.1 km	MPC · JPL
338622	2003 SE_{247}	—	September 26, 2003	Socorro	LINEAR	·	2.4 km	MPC · JPL
338623	2003 SA_{248}	—	September 26, 2003	Socorro	LINEAR	·	2.2 km	MPC · JPL
338624	2003 SC_{256}	—	September 27, 2003	Kitt Peak	Spacewatch	·	2.3 km	MPC · JPL
338625	2003 SR_{260}	—	September 27, 2003	Kitt Peak	Spacewatch	·	1.4 km	MPC · JPL
338626	2003 SA_{262}	—	September 27, 2003	Socorro	LINEAR	(18466)	2.7 km	MPC · JPL
338627	2003 SC_{262}	—	September 27, 2003	Socorro	LINEAR	·	2.1 km	MPC · JPL
338628	2003 SN_{262}	—	September 28, 2003	Socorro	LINEAR	AEO	1.5 km	MPC · JPL
338629	2003 SN_{271}	—	September 25, 2003	Haleakala	NEAT	GEF	1.4 km	MPC · JPL
338630	2003 SJ_{272}	—	September 27, 2003	Socorro	LINEAR	·	2.3 km	MPC · JPL
338631	2003 SF_{278}	—	September 30, 2003	Socorro	LINEAR	·	3.6 km	MPC · JPL
338632	2003 SM_{278}	—	September 30, 2003	Socorro	LINEAR	GEF	1.6 km	MPC · JPL
338633	2003 SS_{278}	—	September 30, 2003	Socorro	LINEAR	·	3.8 km	MPC · JPL
338634	2003 SE_{283}	—	September 20, 2003	Socorro	LINEAR	·	2.8 km	MPC · JPL
338635	2003 SO_{283}	—	September 20, 2003	Socorro	LINEAR	·	2.8 km	MPC · JPL
338636	2003 SH_{289}	—	September 28, 2003	Socorro	LINEAR	·	2.1 km	MPC · JPL
338637	2003 SY_{295}	—	September 29, 2003	Anderson Mesa	LONEOS	·	3.3 km	MPC · JPL
338638	2003 SL_{297}	—	September 18, 2003	Haleakala	NEAT	ADE	2.3 km	MPC · JPL
338639	2003 SU_{298}	—	September 18, 2003	Haleakala	NEAT	·	2.4 km	MPC · JPL
338640	2003 SV_{300}	—	September 17, 2003	Palomar	NEAT	·	2.4 km	MPC · JPL
338641	2003 SV_{301}	—	September 17, 2003	Palomar	NEAT	·	2.1 km	MPC · JPL
338642	2003 SW_{303}	—	September 17, 2003	Palomar	NEAT	·	2.7 km	MPC · JPL
338643	2003 SV_{305}	—	September 30, 2003	Socorro	LINEAR	·	2.2 km	MPC · JPL
338644	2003 SC_{308}	—	September 28, 2003	Kitt Peak	Spacewatch	·	2.4 km	MPC · JPL
338645	2003 SM_{308}	—	September 29, 2003	Anderson Mesa	LONEOS	·	3.1 km	MPC · JPL
338646	2003 SZ_{316}	—	September 27, 2003	Socorro	LINEAR	·	2.3 km	MPC · JPL
338647	2003 SM_{318}	—	September 17, 2003	Kitt Peak	Spacewatch	·	2.3 km	MPC · JPL
338648	2003 SQ_{324}	—	September 17, 2003	Kitt Peak	Spacewatch	·	2.4 km	MPC · JPL
338649	2003 SO_{326}	—	September 18, 2003	Kitt Peak	Spacewatch	·	1.7 km	MPC · JPL
338650	2003 SH_{329}	—	September 22, 2003	Palomar	NEAT	NEM	3.5 km	MPC · JPL
338651	2003 SD_{330}	—	September 26, 2003	Apache Point	SDSS	·	1.7 km	MPC · JPL
338652	2003 SG_{330}	—	September 26, 2003	Apache Point	SDSS	·	1.3 km	MPC · JPL
338653	2003 SW_{330}	—	September 26, 2003	Apache Point	SDSS	·	2.7 km	MPC · JPL
338654	2003 SB_{333}	—	September 30, 2003	Kitt Peak	Spacewatch	·	2.3 km	MPC · JPL
338655	2003 SA_{334}	—	September 22, 2003	Kitt Peak	Spacewatch	GEF	1.4 km	MPC · JPL
338656	2003 SH_{338}	—	September 26, 2003	Apache Point	SDSS	·	1.8 km	MPC · JPL
338657	2003 SV_{340}	—	September 16, 2003	Kitt Peak	Spacewatch	·	1.7 km	MPC · JPL
338658	2003 SM_{342}	—	September 17, 2003	Kitt Peak	Spacewatch	·	1.7 km	MPC · JPL
338659	2003 SS_{342}	—	April 10, 2002	Socorro	LINEAR	EUN	1.4 km	MPC · JPL
338660	2003 SD_{349}	—	September 18, 2003	Kitt Peak	Spacewatch	·	1.8 km	MPC · JPL
338661	2003 ST_{349}	—	September 18, 2003	Kitt Peak	Spacewatch	·	1.9 km	MPC · JPL
338662	2003 SJ_{350}	—	September 18, 2003	Palomar	NEAT	·	2.3 km	MPC · JPL
338663	2003 SZ_{352}	—	September 20, 2003	Kitt Peak	Spacewatch	·	2.2 km	MPC · JPL
338664	2003 SA_{354}	—	September 22, 2003	Anderson Mesa	LONEOS	·	1.8 km	MPC · JPL
338665	2003 SG_{359}	—	February 16, 2001	Kitt Peak	Spacewatch	·	3.3 km	MPC · JPL
338666	2003 SN_{359}	—	September 21, 2003	Kitt Peak	Spacewatch	·	1.8 km	MPC · JPL
338667	2003 SW_{361}	—	September 22, 2003	Kitt Peak	Spacewatch	·	2.1 km	MPC · JPL
338668	2003 SE_{365}	—	September 26, 2003	Apache Point	SDSS	·	1.7 km	MPC · JPL
338669	2003 SJ_{391}	—	September 26, 2003	Apache Point	SDSS	NEM	2.5 km	MPC · JPL
338670	2003 ST_{391}	—	September 26, 2003	Apache Point	SDSS	·	1.6 km	MPC · JPL
338671	2003 SM_{392}	—	September 26, 2003	Apache Point	SDSS	NEM	2.5 km	MPC · JPL
338672	2003 SD_{421}	—	September 30, 2003	Kitt Peak	Spacewatch	·	2.0 km	MPC · JPL
338673	2003 SJ_{423}	—	September 21, 2003	Anderson Mesa	LONEOS	·	2.7 km	MPC · JPL
338674	2003 SN_{429}	—	September 25, 2003	Palomar	NEAT	·	3.4 km	MPC · JPL
338675	2003 SX_{429}	—	September 28, 2003	Kitt Peak	Spacewatch	AST	2.0 km	MPC · JPL
338676	2003 SK_{431}	—	September 19, 2003	Anderson Mesa	LONEOS	·	2.0 km	MPC · JPL
338677	2003 TX_{4}	—	October 1, 2003	Kitt Peak	Spacewatch	·	2.1 km	MPC · JPL
338678	2003 TZ_{4}	—	October 1, 2003	Kitt Peak	Spacewatch	NEM	2.3 km	MPC · JPL
338679	2003 TH_{5}	—	October 2, 2003	Haleakala	NEAT	EUN	1.6 km	MPC · JPL
338680	2003 TM_{8}	—	October 2, 2003	Socorro	LINEAR	EUN	1.7 km	MPC · JPL
338681	2003 TP_{9}	—	October 14, 2003	Palomar	NEAT	·	3.0 km	MPC · JPL
338682	2003 TW_{17}	—	October 15, 2003	Palomar	NEAT	PAD	3.6 km	MPC · JPL
338683	2003 TL_{19}	—	October 15, 2003	Palomar	NEAT	·	2.2 km	MPC · JPL
338684	2003 TM_{29}	—	October 1, 2003	Kitt Peak	Spacewatch	AST	1.7 km	MPC · JPL
338685	2003 TZ_{35}	—	October 1, 2003	Kitt Peak	Spacewatch	·	1.6 km	MPC · JPL
338686	2003 TQ_{36}	—	October 1, 2003	Kitt Peak	Spacewatch	HOF	2.3 km	MPC · JPL
338687	2003 TF_{38}	—	October 2, 2003	Kitt Peak	Spacewatch	·	2.3 km	MPC · JPL
338688	2003 TE_{39}	—	October 2, 2003	Kitt Peak	Spacewatch	WIT	1.0 km	MPC · JPL
338689	2003 TW_{47}	—	October 3, 2003	Kitt Peak	Spacewatch	·	2.7 km	MPC · JPL
338690	2003 TL_{56}	—	October 5, 2003	Kitt Peak	Spacewatch	·	2.4 km	MPC · JPL
338691	2003 TQ_{58}	—	October 1, 2003	Anderson Mesa	LONEOS	·	2.9 km	MPC · JPL
338692	2003 US_{6}	—	October 18, 2003	Palomar	NEAT	·	3.1 km	MPC · JPL
338693	2003 US_{7}	—	October 18, 2003	Kingsnake	J. V. McClusky	·	1.7 km	MPC · JPL
338694	2003 UF_{13}	—	October 19, 2003	Socorro	LINEAR	JUN	1.3 km	MPC · JPL
338695	2003 UY_{13}	—	October 16, 2003	Palomar	NEAT	·	2.1 km	MPC · JPL
338696	2003 US_{15}	—	October 16, 2003	Anderson Mesa	LONEOS	·	2.4 km	MPC · JPL
338697	2003 UV_{18}	—	October 20, 2003	Nashville	Clingan, R.	·	2.2 km	MPC · JPL
338698	2003 UV_{19}	—	October 21, 2003	Socorro	LINEAR	·	490 m	MPC · JPL
338699	2003 UZ_{24}	—	October 20, 2003	Kingsnake	J. V. McClusky	·	2.6 km	MPC · JPL
338700	2003 UL_{32}	—	October 16, 2003	Kitt Peak	Spacewatch	·	2.1 km	MPC · JPL

== 338701–338800 ==
back to top

Designation			Discovery			Properties		Ref
Permanent	Provisional	Named after	Date	Site	Discoverer(s)	Category	Diam.	Ref
338701	2003 UT_{32}	—	October 16, 2003	Kitt Peak	Spacewatch	JUN	1.5 km	MPC · JPL
338702	2003 UX_{37}	—	October 17, 2003	Kitt Peak	Spacewatch	·	1.5 km	MPC · JPL
338703	2003 UQ_{38}	—	October 17, 2003	Kitt Peak	Spacewatch	·	2.8 km	MPC · JPL
338704	2003 UY_{43}	—	October 18, 2003	Kitt Peak	Spacewatch	·	2.3 km	MPC · JPL
338705	2003 UE_{46}	—	September 29, 2003	Kitt Peak	Spacewatch	·	1.7 km	MPC · JPL
338706	2003 UU_{51}	—	October 18, 2003	Palomar	NEAT	·	2.8 km	MPC · JPL
338707	2003 UJ_{54}	—	October 18, 2003	Palomar	NEAT	·	2.5 km	MPC · JPL
338708	2003 UK_{54}	—	October 18, 2003	Palomar	NEAT	·	1.6 km	MPC · JPL
338709	2003 UW_{56}	—	October 23, 2003	Kitt Peak	Spacewatch	(21344)	2.1 km	MPC · JPL
338710	2003 UG_{59}	—	October 16, 2003	Palomar	NEAT	·	3.3 km	MPC · JPL
338711	2003 UD_{60}	—	October 17, 2003	Anderson Mesa	LONEOS	·	2.1 km	MPC · JPL
338712	2003 UC_{62}	—	October 16, 2003	Anderson Mesa	LONEOS	EUN	1.8 km	MPC · JPL
338713	2003 UD_{67}	—	October 16, 2003	Kitt Peak	Spacewatch	·	2.2 km	MPC · JPL
338714	2003 UE_{70}	—	October 18, 2003	Kitt Peak	Spacewatch	·	2.0 km	MPC · JPL
338715	2003 UH_{76}	—	October 17, 2003	Anderson Mesa	LONEOS	·	2.7 km	MPC · JPL
338716	2003 UC_{77}	—	October 17, 2003	Anderson Mesa	LONEOS	GEF	1.9 km	MPC · JPL
338717	2003 UH_{78}	—	October 17, 2003	Anderson Mesa	LONEOS	·	2.9 km	MPC · JPL
338718	2003 UU_{79}	—	October 19, 2003	Haleakala	NEAT	·	3.1 km	MPC · JPL
338719	2003 UA_{81}	—	October 16, 2003	Anderson Mesa	LONEOS	·	3.5 km	MPC · JPL
338720	2003 UG_{83}	—	October 17, 2003	Anderson Mesa	LONEOS	·	2.4 km	MPC · JPL
338721	2003 UX_{87}	—	September 28, 2003	Kitt Peak	Spacewatch	AGN	1.3 km	MPC · JPL
338722	2003 UK_{88}	—	October 19, 2003	Anderson Mesa	LONEOS	·	2.9 km	MPC · JPL
338723	2003 UL_{93}	—	October 17, 2003	Kitt Peak	Spacewatch	·	2.3 km	MPC · JPL
338724	2003 UF_{94}	—	October 18, 2003	Kitt Peak	Spacewatch	·	2.7 km	MPC · JPL
338725	2003 UH_{100}	—	October 19, 2003	Palomar	NEAT	·	2.9 km	MPC · JPL
338726	2003 UY_{103}	—	October 17, 2003	Anderson Mesa	LONEOS	·	2.3 km	MPC · JPL
338727	2003 UT_{107}	—	October 19, 2003	Palomar	NEAT	·	3.2 km	MPC · JPL
338728	2003 UE_{109}	—	October 19, 2003	Kitt Peak	Spacewatch	·	2.0 km	MPC · JPL
338729	2003 UH_{111}	—	October 20, 2003	Kitt Peak	Spacewatch	·	2.2 km	MPC · JPL
338730	2003 UQ_{113}	—	October 20, 2003	Socorro	LINEAR	·	2.5 km	MPC · JPL
338731	2003 UD_{116}	—	October 21, 2003	Socorro	LINEAR	·	2.0 km	MPC · JPL
338732	2003 UO_{117}	—	October 2, 2003	Kitt Peak	Spacewatch	HOF	2.4 km	MPC · JPL
338733	2003 UO_{118}	—	October 17, 2003	Kitt Peak	Spacewatch	MRX	1.2 km	MPC · JPL
338734	2003 UD_{121}	—	October 18, 2003	Kitt Peak	Spacewatch	·	3.6 km	MPC · JPL
338735	2003 UW_{124}	—	October 20, 2003	Socorro	LINEAR	·	2.5 km	MPC · JPL
338736	2003 UX_{128}	—	October 21, 2003	Kitt Peak	Spacewatch	·	2.1 km	MPC · JPL
338737	2003 UK_{136}	—	October 21, 2003	Socorro	LINEAR	JUN	1.6 km	MPC · JPL
338738	2003 UZ_{138}	—	October 16, 2003	Palomar	NEAT	EUN	1.6 km	MPC · JPL
338739	2003 UX_{142}	—	October 18, 2003	Anderson Mesa	LONEOS	·	2.6 km	MPC · JPL
338740	2003 UZ_{148}	—	October 19, 2003	Palomar	NEAT	·	1.8 km	MPC · JPL
338741	2003 UC_{158}	—	October 20, 2003	Kitt Peak	Spacewatch	·	2.0 km	MPC · JPL
338742	2003 UG_{158}	—	October 20, 2003	Kitt Peak	Spacewatch	·	2.4 km	MPC · JPL
338743	2003 UC_{161}	—	October 2, 2003	Kitt Peak	Spacewatch	·	2.4 km	MPC · JPL
338744	2003 UF_{161}	—	October 21, 2003	Kitt Peak	Spacewatch	·	2.6 km	MPC · JPL
338745	2003 UY_{161}	—	September 20, 2003	Socorro	LINEAR	(18466)	2.9 km	MPC · JPL
338746	2003 UP_{166}	—	October 21, 2003	Kitt Peak	Spacewatch	·	2.5 km	MPC · JPL
338747	2003 UR_{166}	—	October 21, 2003	Kitt Peak	Spacewatch	PAD	3.6 km	MPC · JPL
338748	2003 UB_{167}	—	October 22, 2003	Socorro	LINEAR	·	2.4 km	MPC · JPL
338749	2003 UV_{167}	—	October 22, 2003	Socorro	LINEAR	·	2.4 km	MPC · JPL
338750	2003 UV_{169}	—	October 22, 2003	Kitt Peak	Spacewatch	WIT	1.4 km	MPC · JPL
338751	2003 UF_{170}	—	October 22, 2003	Kitt Peak	Spacewatch	·	3.0 km	MPC · JPL
338752	2003 UY_{174}	—	October 21, 2003	Kitt Peak	Spacewatch	·	2.7 km	MPC · JPL
338753	2003 UB_{178}	—	October 21, 2003	Palomar	NEAT	PAD	2.0 km	MPC · JPL
338754	2003 UH_{184}	—	October 21, 2003	Palomar	NEAT	·	3.2 km	MPC · JPL
338755	2003 UD_{187}	—	October 22, 2003	Palomar	NEAT	·	3.2 km	MPC · JPL
338756	2003 UX_{188}	—	October 22, 2003	Kitt Peak	Spacewatch	·	2.4 km	MPC · JPL
338757	2003 UA_{190}	—	October 22, 2003	Kitt Peak	Spacewatch	·	2.5 km	MPC · JPL
338758	2003 UK_{197}	—	October 21, 2003	Kitt Peak	Spacewatch	·	2.1 km	MPC · JPL
338759	2003 UZ_{197}	—	October 21, 2003	Anderson Mesa	LONEOS	·	3.0 km	MPC · JPL
338760	2003 UZ_{205}	—	October 22, 2003	Socorro	LINEAR	·	3.0 km	MPC · JPL
338761	2003 UU_{210}	—	October 23, 2003	Kitt Peak	Spacewatch	·	1.6 km	MPC · JPL
338762	2003 UA_{220}	—	October 21, 2003	Socorro	LINEAR	·	2.4 km	MPC · JPL
338763	2003 UM_{229}	—	October 23, 2003	Anderson Mesa	LONEOS	ADE	5.0 km	MPC · JPL
338764	2003 UW_{233}	—	October 24, 2003	Socorro	LINEAR	·	1.9 km	MPC · JPL
338765	2003 UZ_{234}	—	October 24, 2003	Socorro	LINEAR	GEF	1.7 km	MPC · JPL
338766	2003 UF_{243}	—	October 24, 2003	Socorro	LINEAR	·	2.2 km	MPC · JPL
338767	2003 UF_{248}	—	October 25, 2003	Socorro	LINEAR	·	2.3 km	MPC · JPL
338768	2003 UA_{249}	—	October 25, 2003	Socorro	LINEAR	·	1.8 km	MPC · JPL
338769	2003 UB_{249}	—	October 25, 2003	Socorro	LINEAR	·	4.1 km	MPC · JPL
338770	2003 UO_{249}	—	October 25, 2003	Socorro	LINEAR	GEF	1.4 km	MPC · JPL
338771	2003 UJ_{250}	—	October 25, 2003	Socorro	LINEAR	PAD	2.3 km	MPC · JPL
338772	2003 UQ_{251}	—	October 25, 2003	Kvistaberg	Uppsala-DLR Asteroid Survey	·	2.2 km	MPC · JPL
338773	2003 UQ_{254}	—	October 24, 2003	Kitt Peak	Spacewatch	·	2.1 km	MPC · JPL
338774	2003 UL_{258}	—	October 25, 2003	Kitt Peak	Spacewatch	AEO	1.3 km	MPC · JPL
338775	2003 UJ_{267}	—	October 16, 2003	Anderson Mesa	LONEOS	DOR	3.0 km	MPC · JPL
338776	2003 UZ_{269}	—	October 24, 2003	Bergisch Gladbach	W. Bickel	NEM	2.3 km	MPC · JPL
338777	2003 US_{271}	—	October 28, 2003	Socorro	LINEAR	(13314)	2.4 km	MPC · JPL
338778	2003 UK_{272}	—	October 29, 2003	Kitt Peak	Spacewatch	AEO	1.4 km	MPC · JPL
338779	2003 UQ_{280}	—	October 27, 2003	Socorro	LINEAR	·	2.9 km	MPC · JPL
338780	2003 UG_{286}	—	October 22, 2003	Kitt Peak	M. W. Buie	·	2.0 km	MPC · JPL
338781	2003 UU_{293}	—	October 18, 2003	Socorro	LINEAR	·	3.1 km	MPC · JPL
338782	2003 UA_{296}	—	October 16, 2003	Kitt Peak	Spacewatch	·	1.7 km	MPC · JPL
338783	2003 UF_{298}	—	October 16, 2003	Kitt Peak	Spacewatch	NEM	2.7 km	MPC · JPL
338784	2003 UL_{298}	—	October 16, 2003	Kitt Peak	Spacewatch	·	2.1 km	MPC · JPL
338785	2003 UA_{300}	—	September 27, 2003	Kitt Peak	Spacewatch	·	2.1 km	MPC · JPL
338786	2003 UY_{305}	—	October 18, 2003	Kitt Peak	Spacewatch	·	2.6 km	MPC · JPL
338787	2003 UO_{306}	—	October 18, 2003	Kitt Peak	Spacewatch	·	2.7 km	MPC · JPL
338788	2003 UO_{308}	—	October 19, 2003	Kitt Peak	Spacewatch	·	2.7 km	MPC · JPL
338789	2003 UZ_{316}	—	October 18, 2003	Apache Point	SDSS	·	1.5 km	MPC · JPL
338790	2003 UV_{317}	—	October 18, 2003	Apache Point	SDSS	·	1.6 km	MPC · JPL
338791	2003 UD_{332}	—	October 18, 2003	Apache Point	SDSS	EOS	2.6 km	MPC · JPL
338792	2003 UP_{338}	—	October 18, 2003	Kitt Peak	Spacewatch	·	1.5 km	MPC · JPL
338793	2003 UH_{344}	—	October 19, 2003	Apache Point	SDSS	·	1.7 km	MPC · JPL
338794	2003 UD_{348}	—	October 19, 2003	Apache Point	SDSS	MRX	1.1 km	MPC · JPL
338795	2003 US_{349}	—	October 19, 2003	Apache Point	SDSS	·	1.5 km	MPC · JPL
338796	2003 UH_{351}	—	October 19, 2003	Kitt Peak	Spacewatch	·	2.4 km	MPC · JPL
338797	2003 UK_{375}	—	October 22, 2003	Apache Point	SDSS	NEM	2.4 km	MPC · JPL
338798	2003 UV_{378}	—	October 22, 2003	Apache Point	SDSS	·	1.7 km	MPC · JPL
338799	2003 UW_{391}	—	October 22, 2003	Apache Point	SDSS	(43176)	3.5 km	MPC · JPL
338800	2003 UM_{400}	—	October 23, 2003	Apache Point	SDSS	JUN	1.2 km	MPC · JPL

== 338801–338900 ==
back to top

Designation			Discovery			Properties		Ref
Permanent	Provisional	Named after	Date	Site	Discoverer(s)	Category	Diam.	Ref
338801	2003 UE_{401}	—	October 23, 2003	Apache Point	SDSS	·	1.7 km	MPC · JPL
338802	2003 UZ_{401}	—	October 23, 2003	Apache Point	SDSS	·	1.7 km	MPC · JPL
338803	2003 UR_{414}	—	October 16, 2003	Anderson Mesa	LONEOS	EUN	1.5 km	MPC · JPL
338804	2003 VX_{5}	—	November 15, 2003	Kitt Peak	Spacewatch	·	2.2 km	MPC · JPL
338805	2003 VA_{9}	—	November 15, 2003	Kitt Peak	Spacewatch	·	2.9 km	MPC · JPL
338806	2003 WE_{9}	—	November 16, 2003	Kitt Peak	Spacewatch	·	2.3 km	MPC · JPL
338807	2003 WM_{9}	—	November 18, 2003	Kitt Peak	Spacewatch	DOR	2.6 km	MPC · JPL
338808	2003 WZ_{12}	—	November 19, 2003	Socorro	LINEAR	·	3.0 km	MPC · JPL
338809	2003 WT_{14}	—	November 16, 2003	Kitt Peak	Spacewatch	·	3.1 km	MPC · JPL
338810	2003 WV_{15}	—	November 16, 2003	Kitt Peak	Spacewatch	·	1.9 km	MPC · JPL
338811	2003 WH_{17}	—	November 18, 2003	Palomar	NEAT	CLO	2.6 km	MPC · JPL
338812	2003 WU_{18}	—	November 19, 2003	Socorro	LINEAR	DOR	2.5 km	MPC · JPL
338813	2003 WB_{38}	—	November 19, 2003	Socorro	LINEAR	PAL	2.9 km	MPC · JPL
338814	2003 WM_{40}	—	November 19, 2003	Kitt Peak	Spacewatch	·	4.1 km	MPC · JPL
338815	2003 WL_{52}	—	November 20, 2003	Kitt Peak	Spacewatch	·	2.7 km	MPC · JPL
338816	2003 WK_{60}	—	November 18, 2003	Palomar	NEAT	HOF	3.4 km	MPC · JPL
338817	2003 WG_{61}	—	November 19, 2003	Kitt Peak	Spacewatch	·	980 m	MPC · JPL
338818	2003 WX_{65}	—	November 19, 2003	Kitt Peak	Spacewatch	·	3.2 km	MPC · JPL
338819	2003 WO_{69}	—	November 19, 2003	Kitt Peak	Spacewatch	·	2.8 km	MPC · JPL
338820	2003 WU_{71}	—	November 20, 2003	Socorro	LINEAR	·	3.3 km	MPC · JPL
338821	2003 WM_{74}	—	November 20, 2003	Socorro	LINEAR	DOR	2.8 km	MPC · JPL
338822	2003 WK_{77}	—	November 19, 2003	Kitt Peak	Spacewatch	·	1.7 km	MPC · JPL
338823	2003 WC_{79}	—	November 20, 2003	Socorro	LINEAR	·	2.7 km	MPC · JPL
338824	2003 WJ_{82}	—	November 19, 2003	Palomar	NEAT	·	2.1 km	MPC · JPL
338825	2003 WK_{82}	—	November 19, 2003	Palomar	NEAT	GEF	1.7 km	MPC · JPL
338826	2003 WN_{86}	—	November 21, 2003	Socorro	LINEAR	·	2.9 km	MPC · JPL
338827	2003 WS_{89}	—	November 16, 2003	Kitt Peak	Spacewatch	AGN	1.4 km	MPC · JPL
338828	2003 WV_{95}	—	November 19, 2003	Anderson Mesa	LONEOS	·	4.6 km	MPC · JPL
338829	2003 WR_{99}	—	November 20, 2003	Socorro	LINEAR	·	2.0 km	MPC · JPL
338830	2003 WV_{106}	—	November 22, 2003	Kitt Peak	Spacewatch	·	2.4 km	MPC · JPL
338831	2003 WJ_{107}	—	November 23, 2003	Kitt Peak	Spacewatch	·	1.8 km	MPC · JPL
338832	2003 WK_{107}	—	November 23, 2003	Kitt Peak	Spacewatch	·	1.9 km	MPC · JPL
338833	2003 WF_{111}	—	November 20, 2003	Socorro	LINEAR	·	2.4 km	MPC · JPL
338834	2003 WK_{122}	—	November 20, 2003	Kitt Peak	Spacewatch	DOR	3.1 km	MPC · JPL
338835	2003 WV_{127}	—	November 20, 2003	Socorro	LINEAR	·	3.3 km	MPC · JPL
338836	2003 WE_{143}	—	November 23, 2003	Socorro	LINEAR	AGN	1.5 km	MPC · JPL
338837	2003 WJ_{149}	—	November 24, 2003	Palomar	NEAT	·	2.0 km	MPC · JPL
338838	2003 WD_{152}	—	November 26, 2003	Kitt Peak	Spacewatch	·	1.6 km	MPC · JPL
338839	2003 WN_{152}	—	November 25, 2003	Kingsnake	J. V. McClusky	·	4.4 km	MPC · JPL
338840	2003 WG_{163}	—	November 30, 2003	Kitt Peak	Spacewatch	·	2.0 km	MPC · JPL
338841	2003 WV_{164}	—	November 30, 2003	Kitt Peak	Spacewatch	AGN	1.4 km	MPC · JPL
338842	2003 XE_{1}	—	December 1, 2003	Kitt Peak	Spacewatch	DOR	3.9 km	MPC · JPL
338843	2003 XH_{2}	—	December 1, 2003	Socorro	LINEAR	DOR	3.6 km	MPC · JPL
338844	2003 XX_{5}	—	December 3, 2003	Socorro	LINEAR	GAL	2.5 km	MPC · JPL
338845	2003 XW_{7}	—	December 3, 2003	Socorro	LINEAR	·	2.6 km	MPC · JPL
338846	2003 XD_{9}	—	December 4, 2003	Socorro	LINEAR	JUN	1.6 km	MPC · JPL
338847	2003 XZ_{21}	—	December 14, 2003	Palomar	NEAT	·	2.1 km	MPC · JPL
338848	2003 XD_{26}	—	December 1, 2003	Socorro	LINEAR	·	3.4 km	MPC · JPL
338849	2003 XX_{28}	—	December 1, 2003	Kitt Peak	Spacewatch	WIT	1.4 km	MPC · JPL
338850	2003 XS_{33}	—	December 1, 2003	Kitt Peak	Spacewatch	·	1.8 km	MPC · JPL
338851	2003 YD	—	December 16, 2003	Socorro	LINEAR	·	3.5 km	MPC · JPL
338852	2003 YU_{6}	—	December 17, 2003	Socorro	LINEAR	·	3.2 km	MPC · JPL
338853	2003 YH_{21}	—	December 17, 2003	Kitt Peak	Spacewatch	·	1.6 km	MPC · JPL
338854	2003 YB_{22}	—	December 18, 2003	Socorro	LINEAR	·	3.0 km	MPC · JPL
338855	2003 YL_{23}	—	December 17, 2003	Socorro	LINEAR	·	2.3 km	MPC · JPL
338856	2003 YJ_{25}	—	December 18, 2003	Socorro	LINEAR	·	2.0 km	MPC · JPL
338857	2003 YE_{30}	—	December 18, 2003	Kitt Peak	Spacewatch	·	2.8 km	MPC · JPL
338858	2003 YP_{40}	—	December 19, 2003	Kitt Peak	Spacewatch	L5	14 km	MPC · JPL
338859	2003 YL_{97}	—	December 19, 2003	Socorro	LINEAR	·	2.6 km	MPC · JPL
338860	2003 YN_{105}	—	December 22, 2003	Socorro	LINEAR	·	2.9 km	MPC · JPL
338861	2003 YH_{116}	—	December 22, 2003	Socorro	LINEAR	·	4.1 km	MPC · JPL
338862	2003 YO_{130}	—	December 28, 2003	Socorro	LINEAR	·	2.0 km	MPC · JPL
338863	2003 YX_{136}	—	December 27, 2003	Socorro	LINEAR	·	2.5 km	MPC · JPL
338864	2003 YY_{138}	—	December 27, 2003	Kitt Peak	Spacewatch	·	2.1 km	MPC · JPL
338865	2003 YQ_{139}	—	December 28, 2003	Socorro	LINEAR	·	2.1 km	MPC · JPL
338866	2003 YR_{158}	—	December 17, 2003	Anderson Mesa	LONEOS	·	2.9 km	MPC · JPL
338867	2003 YT_{174}	—	December 19, 2003	Kitt Peak	Spacewatch	·	3.1 km	MPC · JPL
338868	2004 AD_{6}	—	January 14, 2004	Palomar	NEAT	·	2.2 km	MPC · JPL
338869	2004 AA_{8}	—	January 13, 2004	Palomar	NEAT	·	1.1 km	MPC · JPL
338870	2004 AA_{23}	—	January 15, 2004	Kitt Peak	Spacewatch	·	2.4 km	MPC · JPL
338871	2004 BQ_{9}	—	January 16, 2004	Palomar	NEAT	·	970 m	MPC · JPL
338872	2004 BB_{10}	—	January 16, 2004	Palomar	NEAT	·	870 m	MPC · JPL
338873	2004 BT_{12}	—	January 17, 2004	Palomar	NEAT	·	2.3 km	MPC · JPL
338874	2004 BE_{18}	—	January 18, 2004	Palomar	NEAT	·	3.6 km	MPC · JPL
338875	2004 BM_{50}	—	January 21, 2004	Socorro	LINEAR	·	850 m	MPC · JPL
338876	2004 BB_{57}	—	January 23, 2004	Socorro	LINEAR	·	900 m	MPC · JPL
338877	2004 BM_{58}	—	January 23, 2004	Socorro	LINEAR	·	900 m	MPC · JPL
338878	2004 BF_{63}	—	January 22, 2004	Socorro	LINEAR	·	3.1 km	MPC · JPL
338879	2004 BR_{79}	—	January 23, 2004	Socorro	LINEAR	EOS	2.6 km	MPC · JPL
338880	2004 BR_{90}	—	January 24, 2004	Socorro	LINEAR	AEO	1.4 km	MPC · JPL
338881	2004 BM_{99}	—	January 27, 2004	Kitt Peak	Spacewatch	V	970 m	MPC · JPL
338882	2004 BY_{100}	—	January 28, 2004	Kitt Peak	Spacewatch	·	750 m	MPC · JPL
338883	2004 BM_{115}	—	January 30, 2004	Kitt Peak	Spacewatch	·	1.0 km	MPC · JPL
338884	2004 BW_{117}	—	January 29, 2004	Socorro	LINEAR	·	3.8 km	MPC · JPL
338885	2004 BE_{137}	—	January 19, 2004	Kitt Peak	Spacewatch	·	1.8 km	MPC · JPL
338886	2004 BY_{140}	—	January 19, 2004	Kitt Peak	Spacewatch	L5	9.6 km	MPC · JPL
338887	2004 BU_{144}	—	January 19, 2004	Kitt Peak	Spacewatch	·	1.7 km	MPC · JPL
338888	2004 BC_{150}	—	January 17, 2004	Palomar	NEAT	·	1.7 km	MPC · JPL
338889	2004 BV_{151}	—	January 18, 2004	Kitt Peak	Spacewatch	EOS	2.6 km	MPC · JPL
338890	2004 CS_{3}	—	February 10, 2004	Palomar	NEAT	·	4.9 km	MPC · JPL
338891	2004 CW_{5}	—	February 10, 2004	Catalina	CSS	·	4.6 km	MPC · JPL
338892	2004 CB_{16}	—	February 11, 2004	Kitt Peak	Spacewatch	·	2.3 km	MPC · JPL
338893	2004 CJ_{27}	—	February 11, 2004	Palomar	NEAT	·	2.0 km	MPC · JPL
338894	2004 CP_{27}	—	February 12, 2004	Kitt Peak	Spacewatch	KOR	1.3 km	MPC · JPL
338895	2004 CD_{48}	—	February 14, 2004	Haleakala	NEAT	·	970 m	MPC · JPL
338896	2004 CJ_{50}	—	February 13, 2004	Palomar	NEAT	T_{j} (2.98)	4.0 km	MPC · JPL
338897	2004 CW_{54}	—	February 11, 2004	Palomar	NEAT	LIX	4.5 km	MPC · JPL
338898	2004 CT_{75}	—	February 11, 2004	Palomar	NEAT	·	2.2 km	MPC · JPL
338899	2004 CF_{93}	—	February 15, 2004	Socorro	LINEAR	·	3.6 km	MPC · JPL
338900	2004 CS_{93}	—	February 11, 2004	Kitt Peak	Spacewatch	·	3.0 km	MPC · JPL

== 338901–339000 ==
back to top

Designation			Discovery			Properties		Ref
Permanent	Provisional	Named after	Date	Site	Discoverer(s)	Category	Diam.	Ref
338901	2004 CP_{99}	—	February 15, 2004	Catalina	CSS	PHO	2.2 km	MPC · JPL
338902	2004 CH_{100}	—	February 15, 2004	Catalina	CSS	·	4.8 km	MPC · JPL
338903	2004 CX_{128}	—	February 14, 2004	Kitt Peak	Spacewatch	EOS	2.3 km	MPC · JPL
338904	2004 DN_{1}	—	February 16, 2004	Socorro	LINEAR	PHO	1.2 km	MPC · JPL
338905	2004 DB_{10}	—	February 17, 2004	Kitt Peak	Spacewatch	·	4.5 km	MPC · JPL
338906	2004 DL_{26}	—	February 16, 2004	Kitt Peak	Spacewatch	EOS	2.6 km	MPC · JPL
338907	2004 DJ_{27}	—	February 16, 2004	Kitt Peak	Spacewatch	EOS	2.4 km	MPC · JPL
338908	2004 DH_{33}	—	February 18, 2004	Socorro	LINEAR	·	3.7 km	MPC · JPL
338909	2004 DM_{35}	—	February 19, 2004	Socorro	LINEAR	·	3.2 km	MPC · JPL
338910	2004 DW_{38}	—	February 22, 2004	Kitt Peak	Spacewatch	·	830 m	MPC · JPL
338911	2004 DE_{45}	—	February 17, 2004	Haleakala	NEAT	·	4.2 km	MPC · JPL
338912	2004 DJ_{56}	—	February 22, 2004	Kitt Peak	Spacewatch	·	830 m	MPC · JPL
338913	2004 DS_{56}	—	February 22, 2004	Kitt Peak	Spacewatch	·	670 m	MPC · JPL
338914	2004 DU_{56}	—	February 22, 2004	Kitt Peak	Spacewatch	EOS	2.1 km	MPC · JPL
338915	2004 DM_{66}	—	February 26, 2004	Kitt Peak	M. W. Buie	·	2.7 km	MPC · JPL
338916	2004 ED_{1}	—	March 14, 2004	Socorro	LINEAR	H	640 m	MPC · JPL
338917	2004 EN_{2}	—	March 13, 2004	Palomar	NEAT	·	1.4 km	MPC · JPL
338918	2004 EO_{3}	—	March 10, 2004	Palomar	NEAT	·	3.1 km	MPC · JPL
338919	2004 ES_{4}	—	March 11, 2004	Palomar	NEAT	·	3.3 km	MPC · JPL
338920	2004 EU_{8}	—	March 13, 2004	Palomar	NEAT	·	920 m	MPC · JPL
338921	2004 EQ_{12}	—	March 11, 2004	Palomar	NEAT	·	920 m	MPC · JPL
338922	2004 EJ_{13}	—	March 11, 2004	Palomar	NEAT	V	830 m	MPC · JPL
338923	2004 EK_{13}	—	March 11, 2004	Palomar	NEAT	·	2.7 km	MPC · JPL
338924	2004 EO_{19}	—	March 14, 2004	Kitt Peak	Spacewatch	EOS	2.5 km	MPC · JPL
338925	2004 EZ_{27}	—	March 15, 2004	Kitt Peak	Spacewatch	THM	2.7 km	MPC · JPL
338926	2004 EL_{35}	—	March 12, 2004	Palomar	NEAT	·	1.2 km	MPC · JPL
338927	2004 EO_{36}	—	March 13, 2004	Palomar	NEAT	·	1.0 km	MPC · JPL
338928	2004 EJ_{39}	—	March 15, 2004	Kitt Peak	Spacewatch	·	1.0 km	MPC · JPL
338929	2004 EM_{40}	—	March 15, 2004	Kitt Peak	Spacewatch	·	5.3 km	MPC · JPL
338930	2004 ED_{41}	—	March 15, 2004	Catalina	CSS	·	1.0 km	MPC · JPL
338931	2004 EU_{41}	—	March 15, 2004	Socorro	LINEAR	·	3.2 km	MPC · JPL
338932	2004 EH_{42}	—	March 15, 2004	Catalina	CSS	·	1.1 km	MPC · JPL
338933	2004 EY_{46}	—	March 15, 2004	Kitt Peak	Spacewatch	·	2.8 km	MPC · JPL
338934	2004 EU_{48}	—	March 15, 2004	Catalina	CSS	·	830 m	MPC · JPL
338935	2004 EY_{52}	—	March 15, 2004	Socorro	LINEAR	EOS	2.5 km	MPC · JPL
338936	2004 EG_{53}	—	March 15, 2004	Socorro	LINEAR	·	2.9 km	MPC · JPL
338937	2004 EQ_{53}	—	March 15, 2004	Socorro	LINEAR	·	920 m	MPC · JPL
338938	2004 EF_{59}	—	March 15, 2004	Socorro	LINEAR	·	3.4 km	MPC · JPL
338939	2004 EN_{60}	—	March 11, 2004	Palomar	NEAT	·	720 m	MPC · JPL
338940	2004 EU_{61}	—	March 12, 2004	Palomar	NEAT	·	4.8 km	MPC · JPL
338941	2004 EJ_{63}	—	March 13, 2004	Palomar	NEAT	·	840 m	MPC · JPL
338942	2004 EC_{64}	—	March 14, 2004	Socorro	LINEAR	·	5.0 km	MPC · JPL
338943	2004 EL_{64}	—	March 14, 2004	Kitt Peak	Spacewatch	·	2.2 km	MPC · JPL
338944	2004 ER_{66}	—	March 14, 2004	Palomar	NEAT	·	6.0 km	MPC · JPL
338945	2004 EL_{69}	—	March 15, 2004	Socorro	LINEAR	·	2.3 km	MPC · JPL
338946	2004 ET_{70}	—	March 15, 2004	Kitt Peak	Spacewatch	·	2.7 km	MPC · JPL
338947	2004 EN_{74}	—	March 13, 2004	Palomar	NEAT	·	1.1 km	MPC · JPL
338948	2004 ER_{75}	—	March 14, 2004	Kitt Peak	Spacewatch	TIR	3.5 km	MPC · JPL
338949	2004 EW_{75}	—	March 15, 2004	Kitt Peak	Spacewatch	·	1.9 km	MPC · JPL
338950	2004 EA_{76}	—	March 15, 2004	Kitt Peak	Spacewatch	(69559)	4.6 km	MPC · JPL
338951	2004 EQ_{85}	—	March 15, 2004	Socorro	LINEAR	·	4.5 km	MPC · JPL
338952	2004 EL_{88}	—	March 14, 2004	Kitt Peak	Spacewatch	·	2.5 km	MPC · JPL
338953	2004 EL_{101}	—	March 15, 2004	Kitt Peak	Spacewatch	EOS	2.7 km	MPC · JPL
338954	2004 ED_{104}	—	March 15, 2004	Kitt Peak	Spacewatch	·	2.1 km	MPC · JPL
338955	2004 EM_{111}	—	March 15, 2004	Kitt Peak	Spacewatch	·	650 m	MPC · JPL
338956	2004 ET_{112}	—	March 15, 2004	Kitt Peak	Spacewatch	·	840 m	MPC · JPL
338957	2004 EH_{113}	—	March 15, 2004	Kitt Peak	Spacewatch	VER	3.2 km	MPC · JPL
338958	2004 EU_{113}	—	July 26, 1995	Kitt Peak	Spacewatch	·	3.4 km	MPC · JPL
338959	2004 FO_{6}	—	March 16, 2004	Kitt Peak	Spacewatch	·	1.9 km	MPC · JPL
338960	2004 FH_{18}	—	March 15, 2004	Kitt Peak	Spacewatch	ERI	2.0 km	MPC · JPL
338961	2004 FB_{20}	—	March 16, 2004	Socorro	LINEAR	·	3.2 km	MPC · JPL
338962	2004 FC_{23}	—	March 17, 2004	Kitt Peak	Spacewatch	EOS	2.5 km	MPC · JPL
338963	2004 FC_{26}	—	March 17, 2004	Socorro	LINEAR	·	1.3 km	MPC · JPL
338964	2004 FX_{33}	—	March 16, 2004	Socorro	LINEAR	·	1.2 km	MPC · JPL
338965	2004 FG_{41}	—	March 18, 2004	Socorro	LINEAR	·	6.8 km	MPC · JPL
338966	2004 FU_{42}	—	March 18, 2004	Socorro	LINEAR	·	1.1 km	MPC · JPL
338967	2004 FK_{46}	—	March 17, 2004	Kitt Peak	Spacewatch	·	2.4 km	MPC · JPL
338968	2004 FA_{50}	—	March 18, 2004	Socorro	LINEAR	NYS	1.0 km	MPC · JPL
338969	2004 FR_{53}	—	March 17, 2004	Kitt Peak	Spacewatch	·	1.9 km	MPC · JPL
338970	2004 FF_{54}	—	March 18, 2004	Socorro	LINEAR	·	2.7 km	MPC · JPL
338971	2004 FQ_{56}	—	March 16, 2004	Kitt Peak	Spacewatch	EUP	5.2 km	MPC · JPL
338972	2004 FG_{65}	—	March 19, 2004	Socorro	LINEAR	·	4.5 km	MPC · JPL
338973	2004 FN_{74}	—	March 17, 2004	Kitt Peak	Spacewatch	·	3.4 km	MPC · JPL
338974	2004 FN_{77}	—	March 18, 2004	Socorro	LINEAR	·	740 m	MPC · JPL
338975	2004 FS_{84}	—	March 18, 2004	Socorro	LINEAR	·	1.0 km	MPC · JPL
338976	2004 FC_{89}	—	March 20, 2004	Kitt Peak	Spacewatch	·	2.8 km	MPC · JPL
338977	2004 FW_{101}	—	March 24, 2004	Anderson Mesa	LONEOS	·	2.9 km	MPC · JPL
338978	2004 FT_{104}	—	March 23, 2004	Socorro	LINEAR	·	990 m	MPC · JPL
338979	2004 FC_{105}	—	March 23, 2004	Kitt Peak	Spacewatch	·	3.1 km	MPC · JPL
338980	2004 FZ_{111}	—	March 26, 2004	Kitt Peak	Spacewatch	·	2.0 km	MPC · JPL
338981	2004 FM_{112}	—	March 26, 2004	Kitt Peak	Spacewatch	·	1.0 km	MPC · JPL
338982	2004 FV_{112}	—	March 26, 2004	Kitt Peak	Spacewatch	·	770 m	MPC · JPL
338983	2004 FV_{126}	—	March 27, 2004	Socorro	LINEAR	·	1.2 km	MPC · JPL
338984	2004 FF_{128}	—	March 27, 2004	Socorro	LINEAR	·	3.6 km	MPC · JPL
338985	2004 FQ_{130}	—	March 22, 2004	Anderson Mesa	LONEOS	·	4.1 km	MPC · JPL
338986	2004 FE_{135}	—	March 27, 2004	Socorro	LINEAR	·	780 m	MPC · JPL
338987	2004 FZ_{136}	—	March 28, 2004	Socorro	LINEAR	·	5.7 km	MPC · JPL
338988	2004 FU_{142}	—	March 27, 2004	Catalina	CSS	·	1.2 km	MPC · JPL
338989	2004 FO_{145}	—	March 30, 2004	Kitt Peak	Spacewatch	(43176) ·	4.6 km	MPC · JPL
338990	2004 GS	—	April 9, 2004	Siding Spring	SSS	·	790 m	MPC · JPL
338991	2004 GC_{3}	—	April 9, 2004	Siding Spring	SSS	·	2.8 km	MPC · JPL
338992	2004 GN_{5}	—	April 11, 2004	Palomar	NEAT	·	1.2 km	MPC · JPL
338993	2004 GK_{8}	—	April 12, 2004	Kitt Peak	Spacewatch	·	830 m	MPC · JPL
338994	2004 GH_{12}	—	April 9, 2004	Siding Spring	SSS	·	4.5 km	MPC · JPL
338995	2004 GU_{15}	—	April 9, 2004	Palomar	NEAT	PHO	2.5 km	MPC · JPL
338996	2004 GQ_{28}	—	April 12, 2004	Kitt Peak	Spacewatch	·	1.0 km	MPC · JPL
338997	2004 GO_{30}	—	April 12, 2004	Kitt Peak	Spacewatch	NYS	1.3 km	MPC · JPL
338998	2004 GD_{31}	—	April 13, 2004	Palomar	NEAT	·	1.6 km	MPC · JPL
338999	2004 GF_{32}	—	April 12, 2004	Kitt Peak	Spacewatch	·	3.0 km	MPC · JPL
339000	2004 GK_{38}	—	April 15, 2004	Catalina	CSS	·	960 m	MPC · JPL

back to top

== See also ==
- Meanings of minor-planet names: 338001–339000
