= Meanings of minor-planet names: 338001–339000 =

As minor planet discoveries are confirmed, they are given a permanent number by the IAU's Minor Planet Center (MPC), and the discoverers can then submit names for them, following the IAU's naming conventions. The list below concerns those minor planets in the specified number-range that have received names, and explains the meanings of those names.

Official naming citations of newly named small Solar System bodies are approved and published in a bulletin by IAU's Working Group for Small Bodies Nomenclature (WGSBN). Before May 2021, citations were published in MPC's Minor Planet Circulars for many decades. Recent citations can also be found on the JPL Small-Body Database (SBDB). Until his death in 2016, German astronomer Lutz D. Schmadel compiled these citations into the Dictionary of Minor Planet Names (DMP) and regularly updated the collection.

Based on Paul Herget's The Names of the Minor Planets, Schmadel also researched the unclear origin of numerous asteroids, most of which had been named prior to World War II. This article incorporates text from this source, which is in the public domain: SBDB New namings may only be added to this list below after official publication as the preannouncement of names is condemned. The WGSBN publishes a comprehensive guideline for the naming rules of non-cometary small Solar System bodies.

== 338001–338100 ==
Named minor planet	Provisional	This minor planet was named for...	Ref · Catalog
There are no named minor planets in this number range

== 338101–338200 ==
back to top

Named minor planet	Provisional	This minor planet was named for...	Ref · Catalog
There are no named minor planets in this number range

== 338201–338300 ==
back to top

Named minor planet	Provisional	This minor planet was named for...	Ref · Catalog
338274 Valančius	2002 TM_{303}	Motiejus Kazimieras Valančius (1801–1875) was a Roman Catholic bishop of Samogitia, historian and one of the best known Lithuanian writers of the 19th century. He also was the inaugurator of the temperance movement in Lithuania.	JPL · 338274
338284 Hodál	2002 TW_{381}	Gabriel Hodál (born 1963), a Slovak amateur astronomer and astronomy popularizer of the astronomy club in Nové Zámky.	IAU · 338284

== 338301–338400 ==
back to top

Named minor planet	Provisional	This minor planet was named for...	Ref · Catalog
338371 Gerritsen	2002 XO_{119}	Adri Gerritsen (b. 1959), a Dutch amateur astronomer.	IAU · 338371
338373 Fonóalbert	2002 YG_{3}	Albert Fonó (1881–1972), a Hungarian mechanical engineer	JPL · 338373

== 338401–338500 ==
back to top

Named minor planet	Provisional	This minor planet was named for...	Ref · Catalog
There are no named minor planets in this number range

== 338501–338600 ==
back to top

Named minor planet	Provisional	This minor planet was named for...	Ref · Catalog
338578 Csapodyvera	2003 SU_{111}	Vera Csapody, first Hungarian female botanist.	IAU · 338578

== 338601–338700 ==
back to top

Named minor planet	Provisional	This minor planet was named for...	Ref · Catalog
There are no named minor planets in this number range

== 338701–338800 ==
back to top

Named minor planet	Provisional	This minor planet was named for...	Ref · Catalog
There are no named minor planets in this number range

== 338801–338900 ==
back to top

Named minor planet	Provisional	This minor planet was named for...	Ref · Catalog
There are no named minor planets in this number range

== 338901–339000 ==
back to top

Named minor planet	Provisional	This minor planet was named for...	Ref · Catalog
There are no named minor planets in this number range

back to top

Preceded by 337,001–338,000	Meanings of minor-planet names List of minor planets: 338,001–339,000	Succeeded by 339,001–340,000
